= Tom Lapslie =

English footballer

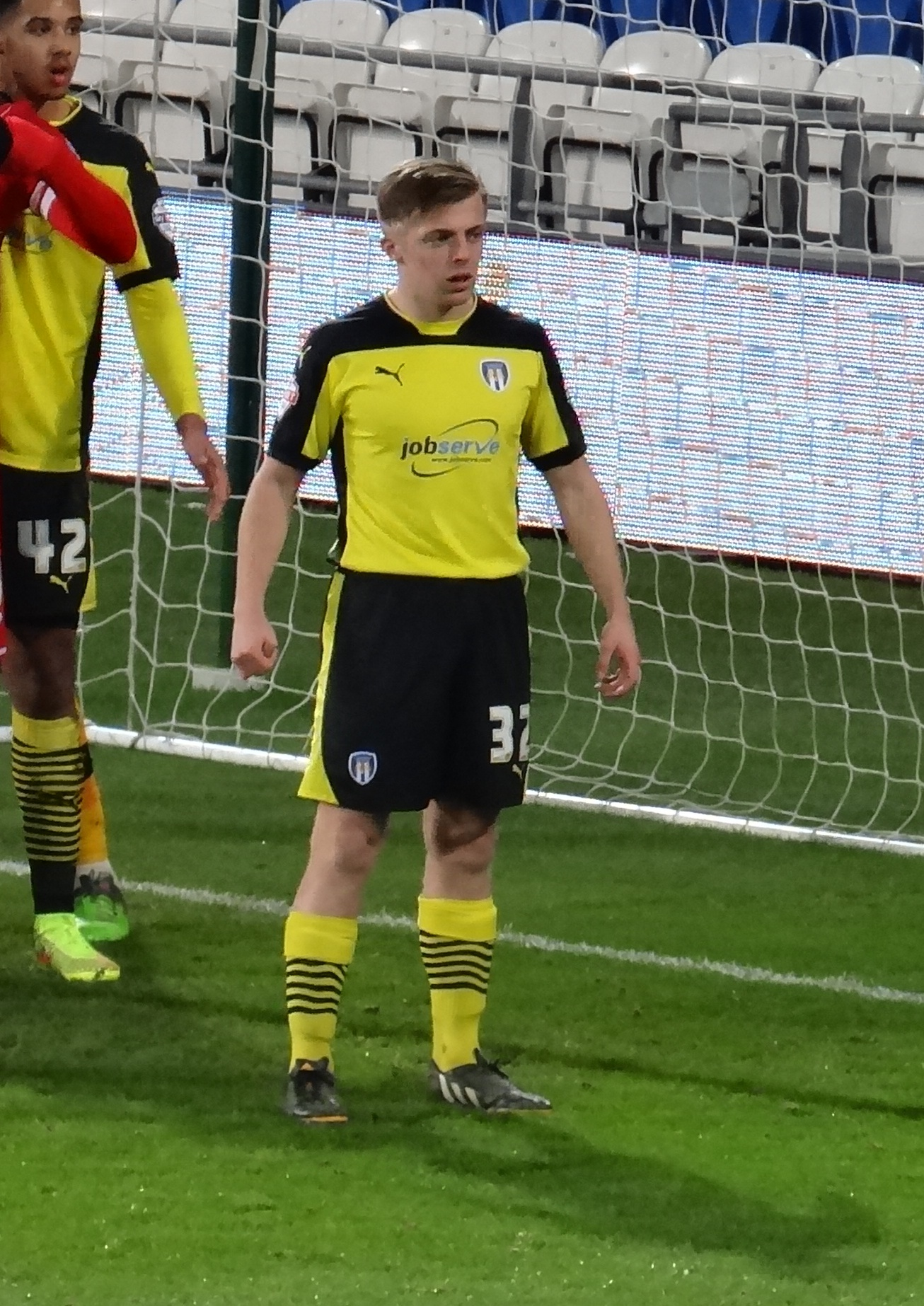
- Lapslie playing for Colchester United in 2015

Personal information
- Full name: Thomas William Cavendish Lapslie
- Date of birth: 5 October 1995 (age 31)
- Place of birth: Waltham Forest, London, England
- Height: 5 ft 6 in (1.68 m)
- Position: Midfielder

Team information
- Current team: Farnborough
- Number: 4

Youth career
- Maldon Town
- –2012: Ongar Juniors
- 2012–2015: Colchester United

Senior career*
Years	Team	Apps	(Gls)
2015–2021	Colchester United	152	(3)
2021–2024	Torquay United	99	(9)
2025–2026	Chelmsford City	18	(0)
2026–	Farnborough	7	(0)
- * Club domestic league appearances and goals as of 21:42, 22 October 2026 (UTC)

Thomas William Cavendish Lapslie (born 5 October 1995) is an English professional footballer who last played as a midfielder for National League South club Farnborough.

He joined Colchester United's Academy in 2012 for his scholarship, and made his professional debut for the club in January 2015. He made 170 appearances for the club between 2015 and 2021. He later joined Torquay United on his release from Colchester.

== Career ==
Born in Waltham Forest, London, Lapslie won the Chelmsford Youth League Cup final at under-12 level for his side Ongar Juniors against Chelmsford Youth. His team won 1–0 at Billericay Town's New Lodge ground in 2008. He is also a graduate from the Chelmsford-based P.A.S.S. Academy.

=== Colchester United ===
After playing Sunday League football for Ongar Juniors and spending time with Maldon Town, Lapslie joined Colchester United's Academy at the age of 16, before signing a professional development contract with the club one year into his two-year scholarship alongside Michael O'Donoghue in April 2013. Then-academy manager Tony Humes described Lapslie as a "dynamic central midfielder" who is a "leader in the [youth] team". During the 2013–14 season, Lapslie featured regularly in the successful under-18 side, helping his team to a Youth Alliance South East league title and Youth Alliance Cup double, starting in the 4–2 final victory over Bradford City at Valley Parade on 29 April 2014.

Lapslie first travelled with the Colchester United first-team squad in December 2012, travelling to Bournemouth for their League One fixture, and travelled again in the 2014–15 season for a trip to Crewe Alexandra in September 2014, having been in good form for the under-21 development squad.

Lapslie made his professional debut for Colchester on 2 January 2015 in their FA Cup third round tie with Cardiff City at the Cardiff City Stadium, where he came on as a 64th-minute substitute for George Moncur in the 3–1 defeat. He then made his full debut and home debut on 24 January, starting and playing the full 90 minutes in Colchester's 2–0 relegation battle victory over Leyton Orient. Lapslie was thrust into the first-team for successive league matches, admitting that "I can't believe it at the moment, I have to keep pinching myself... being involved with the first team".

Lapslie scored his first senior goal on 21 February with the opening goal of Colchester's 3–2 win over Bristol City at the Colchester Community Stadium, heading in Elliott Hewitt's spilled cross. He made his tenth league start on 11 April in Colchester's 1–0 defeat by Coventry City, announcing that he "couldn't have imagined playing so many games, before this season started". He made twelve appearances in all competitions. He was then offered a three-year contract to extend his stay with the club until the summer of 2018, which he signed on 23 April.

Lapslie made his first appearance of the 2015–16 season on 17 October 2015 when he replaced Joe Edwards in the second half of a 5–0 defeat by Wigan Athletic at the DW Stadium. He scored his second goal for the club and his first of the season on 6 December, heading in an equaliser at 2–2 during Colchester's 3–2 FA Cup win over Altrincham at the Community Stadium. He made twelve first-team appearances for the club during the season.

Lapslie established himself in the first-team during the 2016–17 season, earning the Colchester United Young Player of the Year accolade at the club's end of season awards ceremony. He played 40 games for the first-team during the campaign.

Lapslie received the first red card of his career on 21 October 2017 against Coventry City. He was sent off for deliberate handball one minute after being shown a yellow card for a foul.

On 12 May 2018, Lapslie took up the option on his contract to remain with Colchester United for a further year until at least summer 2019. On 3 January 2019, he agreed a 2 1/2-year contract extension to commit himself to the club until summer 2021.

After his contract expired in May 2021, Lapslie was released by Colchester United. He had made 170 appearances and scored four goals since his professional debut in January 2015.

=== Torquay United ===
Following his release from Colchester United, Lapslie signed for National League side Torquay United on 19 July 2021. On 9 June 2024, following an injury sustained in the final game of the season against Havant & Waterlooville, Lapslie announced he had left Torquay after featuring in 109 games, scoring 11 times, for the club in all competitions.

=== Chelmsford City ===
On 2 June 2025, having missed the entirety of the 2024–25 season, Lapslie returned to football, joining National League South side Chelmsford City. On 21 May 2026, Chelmsford announced Lapslie had left the club.

=== Farnborough ===
On 12 June 2026, Lapslie agreed to join fellow National League South side Farnborough.

== Personal life ==
Lapslie is the older brother of Bradford City midfielder George Lapslie.

== Career statistics ==
As of 10 October 2026

Appearances and goals by club, season and competition
Club	Season	League			FA Cup		League Cup		Other		Total	
Club	Season	Division	Apps	Goals	Apps	Goals	Apps	Goals	Apps	Goals	Apps	Goals
Colchester United	2014–15	League One	11	1	1	0	0	0	0	0	12	1
Colchester United	2015–16	League One	10	1	2	1	0	0	0	0	12	2
Colchester United	2016–17	League Two	37	0	0	0	1	0	2 (Note: Appearance(s) in EFL Trophy)	0	40	0
Colchester United	2017–18	League Two	29	0	0	0	1	0	1	0	31	0
Colchester United	2018–19	League Two	35	1	1	0	0	0	0	0	36	1
Colchester United	2019–20	League Two	17	0	0	0	4	0	5 (Note: Three appearances in EFL Trophy, two appearances in EFL League Two play-offs)	0	26	0
Colchester United	2020–21	League Two	13	0	0	0	0	0	0	0	13	0
Colchester United	Total		152	3	4	1	6	0	8	0	170	4
Torquay United	2021–22	National League	31	2	1	0	—		1 (Note: Appearance(s) in FA Trophy)	0	33	2
Torquay United	2022–23	National League	34	5	3	0	—		2	0	39	5
Torquay United	2023–24	National League South	34	2	3	2	—		0	0	37	4
Torquay United	Total		99	9	7	2	—		3	0	109	11
Chelmsford City	2025–26	National League South	18	0	0	0	—		0	0	18	0
Farnborough	2026–27	National League South	7	0	1	0	—		0	0	8	0
Career total			276	12	12	3	6	0	11	0	305	15

== Honours ==
Colchester United U18

- Football League Youth Alliance South East: 2013–14
- Football League Youth Alliance Cup: 2013–14

Individual

- Colchester United Young Player of the Year: 2016–17
