= Louis Dunne =

Irish footballer (born 1998)

Personal information
- Full name: Louis Anthony Dunne
- Date of birth: 14 September 1998 (age 28)
- Place of birth: Colchester, England
- Height: 1.75 m (5 ft 9 in)
- Position: Midfielder

Team information
- Current team: Chelmsford City
- Number: 20

Youth career
- 2006–2016: Colchester United

Senior career*
Years	Team	Apps	(Gls)
2016–2020	Colchester United	2	(0)
2017	→ Concord Rangers (loan)	5	(0)
2020	→ Farnborough (loan)	6	(0)
2020–2021	Farnborough	7	(0)
2021–2025	Chelmsford City	56	(2)
2023	→ Coggeshall Town (loan)	5	(1)
2024	→ Hayes & Yeading United (loan)	11	(1)
2024–2025	→ Dartford (loan)	21	(0)
2025–2026	Maldon & Tiptree	35	(2)
2026	Aveley	0	(0)
2026–	Chelmsford City	0	(0)

International career^{‡}
2013–2014	Republic of Ireland U15		
2014	Republic of Ireland U17	2	(0)
2016	Republic of Ireland U18	1	(0)
- * Club domestic league appearances and goals as of 17:54, 28 May 2026 (UTC) ‡ National team caps and goals as of 17:10, 30 November 2024 (UTC)

Louis Anthony Dunne (born 7 September 1998) is an Irish professional footballer who plays as a midfielder for National League South club Chelmsford City.

Dunne is the son of former Colchester United player and manager Joe Dunne and began his career at the same club at the age of eight, progressing through the club's Academy. He made his professional debut for Colchester in March 2016, and has represented the Republic of Ireland at under-15, under-17 and under-18 levels. He had his first spell away from Colchester on loan with National League South side Concord Rangers in 2017. He then joined Farnborough on loan in January 2020. He was released by Colchester in July 2020.

== Club career ==
=== Colchester United ===
Born in Colchester, Dunne is the son of former Colchester United player, manager and Hall of Fame member Joe Dunne. Louis was born just 36 hours after Joe had played for the Colchester first team in Division Two, and his manager at the time Steve Wignall wanted his side to go out against Reading following his birth to "win for Louis".

Dunne started his career with Colchester's Academy at the age of eight and joined the club's Elite Football Programme in 2011 at Thurstable School in Tiptree. He was offered a youth scholarship by the club in September 2012, and during the 2012–13 season he was playing above his age group with the under-15 and under-16 Colchester United sides. He again stepped up during the 2013–14 season, regularly playing for the under-18 side.

Ahead of the 2015–16 season, Dunne was given the shirt number 41, and manager Tony Humes named him in his matchday squad to face Oldham Athletic in League One on 18 August, but he was an unused substitute. Dunne signed a three-year Professional Development contract with the club in January 2016.

New manager Kevin Keen named Dunne in his matchday squad for Colchester's home game against Wigan Athletic on 12 March 2016. He was introduced as a 77th-minute substitute in place of West Ham United loanee Elliot Lee during the 3–3 with the second-placed side. Keen then named Dunne in his starting eleven for Colchester's home tie with Burton Albion at the Colchester Community Stadium on 23 April. He started the match, but was taken off at half-time for George Moncur when the U's were 1–0 down. The game finished 3–0 and relegated Colchester to League Two.

During the 2016–17 season, Dunne failed to make a league appearance under John McGreal, but did make a single appearance in each of the three cup competitions Colchester were competing in.

National League South side Concord Rangers signed Dunne on an initial month-long youth loan on 25 August 2017. He made his debut on 26 August in Concord's 2–1 defeat by St Albans City. He made five league appearances. He suffered an anterior cruciate ligament injury during training in early 2018 which would rule him out of action for around nine months.

Dunne signed a two-year contract extension with Colchester in May 2018.

On 25 January 2020, Dunne joined Southern League Premier Division South side Farnborough on loan until the end of February. He made his debut the same day in a 2–0 home win against Beaconsfield Town. On 2 March, his loan was extended until the end of the season.

Dunne was one of 16 players to be released by Colchester United in the summer of 2020.

Ahead of the 2020–21 campaign, Dunne returned to Farnborough.

=== Non-League ===
On 30 April 2021, Dunne signed for National League South club Chelmsford City. In the final months of 2023, Dunne played for Coggeshall Town, after he suffered a serious injury resulting in surgery the previous December. On 1 January 2024, Dunne joined Hayes & Yeading United on an initial one-month long loan.

On 29 November 2024, Dunne joined Dartford on loan until January 2025, which was subsequently extended until the end of the season.

On 10 May 2025, Dunne announced he had left Chelmsford.

On 18 May 2025, Dunne signed for Isthmian League North Division side Maldon & Tiptree.

On 28 May 2026, Dunne joined Isthmian League Premier Division club Aveley.

On 1 July 2026, Dunne returned to Chelmsford City as a player-coach, leaving Aveley without playing for the club.

== International career ==
Dunne is eligible to represent the Republic of Ireland through his father Joe. During the 2012–13 season, Dunne was called up by the under-15 side for a training camp. He then made his under-15 debut on 18 April 2013, starting in the 3–0 defeat to Finland.

Dunne progressed to the under-17 team for the 2014–15 season, making his debut against Malta in August 2014, and then playing against Serbia the same year.

Following his professional debut for Colchester United, Dunne was called up to the under-18 squad for their friendly match against England on 27 March 2016 at St George's Park. He started in the match, playing the first 45 minutes of what ended as a 4–1 defeat for Ireland.

== Coaching career ==
In 2021, at the age of 22, Dunne returned to former club Colchester United as an academy coach. Upon joining Chelmsford City as a player, Dunne began coaching in the club's academy. On 26 June 2023, following the extension of Dunne's contract at Chelmsford, it was announced Dunne would take up a coaching role in Chelmsford's first team alongside his playing role.

== Career statistics ==
As of end of 2025–26 season

Appearances and goals by club, season and competition
Club	Season	League			FA Cup		League Cup		Other		Total	
Club	Season	Division	Apps	Goals	Apps	Goals	Apps	Goals	Apps	Goals	Apps	Goals
Colchester United	2015–16	League One	2	0	0	0	0	0	0	0	2	0
Colchester United	2016–17	League Two	0	0	1	0	1	0	1 (Note: One appearance in the EFL Trophy)	0	3	0
Colchester United	2017–18	League Two	0	0	0	0	0	0	0	0	0	0
Colchester United	2018–19	League Two	0	0	0	0	0	0	0	0	0	0
Colchester United	2019–20	League Two	0	0	0	0	0	0	0	0	0	0
Colchester United	Total		2	0	1	0	1	0	1	0	5	0
Concord Rangers (loan)	2017–18	National League South	5	0	0	0	–		0	0	5	0
Farnborough (loan)	2019–20	SL Premier Division South	6	0	–		–		0	0	6	0
Farnborough	2020–21	SL Premier Division South	7	0	3	0	–		1 (Note: One appearance in the FA Trophy)	0	11	0
Chelmsford City	2021–22	National League South	37	1	1	0	–		0	0	38	1
Chelmsford City	2022–23	National League South	11	1	3	0	–		0	0	14	1
Chelmsford City	2023–24	National League South	2	0	0	0	–		0	0	2	0
Chelmsford City	2024–25	National League South	6	0	0	0	–		1 (Note: One appearance in the FA Trophy)	0	7	0
Chelmsford City	Total		56	2	4	0	0	0	1	0	61	2
Coggeshall Town (loan)	2023–24	Essex Senior League	5	1	—		—		0	0	5	1
Hayes & Yeading United (loan)	2023–24	SL Premier Division South	11	1	—		—		0	0	11	1
Dartford (loan)	2024–25	Isthmian League; Premier Division	21	0	—		—		3 (Note: One appearance in the Velocity Cup) (Note: Two appearances in the Isthmian Premier League Play-Offs)	0	24	0
Maldon & Tiptree	2025–26	Isthmian League; North Division	35	2	6	2	—		2 (Note: One appearance in the FA Trophy, one appearance in the Essex Senior Cup)	0	43	4
Career total			148	6	14	2	1	0	8	0	171	8

== Honours ==
Maldon & Tiptree

- Isthmian League North Division: 2025–26
