= Dillon Barnes =

Jamaican footballer (born 1996)

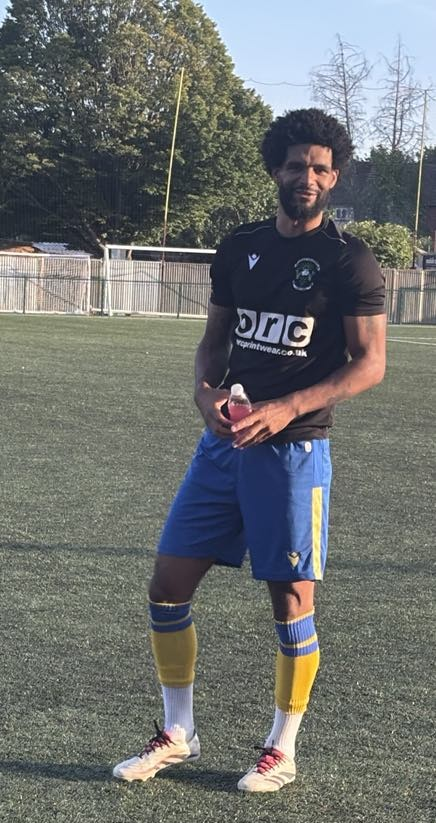
- Dillon Barnes in 2025.

Personal information
- Full name: Dillon Barnes
- Date of birth: 8 April 1996 (age 30)
- Place of birth: Enfield Town, London, England
- Height: 1.93 m (6 ft 4 in)
- Position: Goalkeeper

Team information
- Current team: Haringey Borough

Youth career
- 2012–2014: Barnet
- 2014–2015: Fulham

Senior career*
Years	Team	Apps	(Gls)
2014	Beckenham Town	1	(0)
2014–2015	Fulham	0	(0)
2014–2015	→ Farnborough (loan)	11	(0)
2015	Bedford Town	3	(0)
2015–2019	Colchester United	24	(0)
2017	→ Welling United (loan)	15	(0)
2018	→ Hemel Hempstead Town (loan)	3	(0)
2019–2022	Queens Park Rangers	0	(0)
2020–2021	→ Hibernian (loan)	4	(0)
2021	→ Burton Albion (loan)	1	(0)
2022	→ Yeovil Town (loan)	1	(0)
2022	→ Aldershot Town (loan)	4	(0)
2023–2024	Haringey Borough	36	(0)
2024–2025	Dulwich Hamlet	23	(0)
2025–	Haringey Borough	0	(0)

International career
2021	Jamaica	1	(0)
- * Club domestic league appearances and goals as of 16:43, 26 July 2025 (UTC)

Dillon Barnes (born 8 April 1996) is a professional footballer who plays as a goalkeeper for Haringey Borough. Born in England, he represents the Jamaica national team.

Barnes began his career with Barnet and later Fulham. He failed to make a first-team appearance for either club. He was loaned to Farnborough in late 2014, making his competitive debut in the Conference South, making 14 appearances. He left Fulham in summer 2015, briefly joining Bedford Town before signing for Colchester United following a trial. He made his professional debut in August 2016 for Colchester. He was loaned to Welling United in August 2017 and then Hemel Hempstead Town in January 2018.

== Career ==
Born in Enfield Town, London, Barnes began his career with Barnet where he first featured on the bench for the first-team during the 2012–13 season. He moved to Fulham for the 2014–15 season, and he was loaned out to Conference South side Farnborough for the second half of the season. He made eleven appearances for Farnborough between December 2014 and April 2015.

In summer 2015, Barnes joined Bedford Town before joining League One club Colchester United on trial in August. He kept one clean sheet in three games for the under-21s before being offered a one-year development contract which he signed on 1 September.

Barnes missed an opportunity to make his professional debut on 8 May 2016, in Colchester's final game of the 2015–16 season after getting caught in traffic, meaning teammate James Bransgrove was selected for the game ahead of him for his own debut. Barnes eventually made his debut for Colchester on 9 August 2016, when he was named in the starting line-up for their EFL Cup match against Brighton & Hove Albion. He conceded four goals as Colchester lost to their Championship opponents 4–0. In his next game on 8 November, in the EFL Trophy, Barnes saved two penalties during the penalty shoot-out with Charlton Athletic to help his side to a 4–3 win and an additional bonus point.

National League South side Welling United signed Barnes in an initial one-month loan deal on 8 August 2017. He made his Welling debut in their 1–0 defeat by Chelmsford City the same day. On 8 September, his loan was extended to run until 8 November.

In January 2018, Barnes signed on an initial one-month loan for National League South side Hemel Hempstead Town.

On 28 April 2018, Barnes made his English Football League debut, standing in for Sam Walker for Colchester's League Two game against Swindon Town. He kept a clean sheet in the 0–0 draw.

Following Sam Walker's summer move to Reading, Barnes was handed Colchester United's number one shirt. He started in Colchester's first game of the 2018–19 season, keeping a clean sheet in a 0–0 draw with Notts County. He was sent off for the first time in his career on 22 April, after being shown a red card for violent conduct during Colchester's 1–1 draw at Yeovil Town.

=== Queens Park Rangers ===
On 22 July 2019, Barnes joined Championship side Queens Park Rangers on a two-year deal.

==== Hibernian (loan) ====
He was loaned to Scottish club Hibernian in September 2020. Barnes made his debut in the Scottish League Cup, playing the duration of a 3–1 victory over Brora Rangers. On 4 January 2021, Barnes was recalled by Queens Park Rangers, after only three months on loan at Hibernian.

==== Burton Albion (loan) ====
On 18 January 2021, Barnes joined League One bottom side Burton Albion on loan until the end of the 2020–21 season.

==== Yeovil Town (loan) ====
On 1 January 2022, Barnes joined National League club Yeovil Town on a short-term loan deal.

==== Aldershot Town (loan) ====
On 12 February 2022, Barnes joined National League side Aldershot Town on loan until the end of the 2021–22 season. On 11 March 2022, Barnes' loan spell was cut short a month in, with the Jamaican international leaving the club following four first-team appearances.

=== Non-League ===
Having taken a year out from football following his release from Queens Park Rangers, Barnes joined Isthmian League Premier Division side Haringey Borough.

In June 2024, Barnes joined Dulwich Hamlet. He returned to Haringey Borough ahead of the 2025–26 season.

== International career ==
Barnes was called up to represent the Jamaica national team for a pair of friendlies in June 2021. On 1 July 2021 Barnes was named to the squad for the 2021 CONCACAF Gold Cup. He made his official debut on 20 July in Jamaica's final group stage game against Costa Rica.

== Career statistics ==
=== Club ===
As of end of 2024–25 season

Appearances and goals by club, season and competition
Club	Season	League			National Cup		League Cup (Note: Includes appearances in Scottish League Cup)		Other		Total	
Club	Season	Division	Apps	Goals	Apps	Goals	Apps	Goals	Apps	Goals	Apps	Goals
Beckenham Town	2014–15	Southern Counties East League	1	0	0	0	—		0	0	1	0
Fulham	2014–15	Championship	0	0	0	0	0	0	—		0	0
Farnborough (loan)	2014–15	Conference South	11	0	0	0	—		4 (Note: Appearances in FA Trophy)	0	15	0
Bedford Town	2015–16	Southern League; Division One Central	3	0	0	0	—		0	0	3	0
Colchester United	2015–16	League One	0	0	0	0	0	0	0	0	0	0
Colchester United	2016–17	League Two	0	0	0	0	1	0	1 (Note: Appearance(s) in EFL Trophy)	0	2	0
Colchester United	2017–18	League Two	2	0	0	0	0	0	0	0	2	0
Colchester United	2018–19	League Two	22	0	1	0	1	0	2	0	26	0
Colchester United	Total		24	0	1	0	2	0	3	0	30	0
Welling United (loan)	2017–18	National League South	15	0	1	0	—		1 (Note: Appearance in Kent Senior Cup)	0	17	0
Hemel Hempstead Town (loan)	2017–18	National League South	3	0	—		—		0	0	3	0
Queens Park Rangers	2019–20	Championship	0	0	0	0	0	0	—		0	0
Queens Park Rangers	2020–21	Championship	0	0	0	0	0	0	—		0	0
Queens Park Rangers	2021–22	Championship	0	0	0	0	0	0	—		0	0
Queens Park Rangers	Total		0	0	0	0	0	0	0	0	0	0
Hibernian (loan)	2020–21	Scottish Premiership	4	0	0	0	4	0	—		8	0
Burton Albion (loan)	2020–21	League One	1	0	0	0	0	0	—		1	0
Yeovil Town (loan)	2021–22	National League	1	0	1	0	—		0	0	2	0
Aldershot Town (loan)	2021–22	National League	4	0	—		—		0	0	4	0
Haringey Borough	2023–24	Isthmian League Premier Division	36	0	3	0	—		4 (Note: One appearance in FA Trophy, three appearances in Alan Turvey Trophy)	0	43	0
Dulwich Hamlet	2024–25	Isthmian League Premier Division	23	0	2	0	—		1 (Note: Appearance(s) in London Senior Cup)	0	26	0
Career total			126	0	8	0	6	0	13	0	153	0

=== International ===
As of match played 20 July 2021

Appearances and goals by national team and year
National team	Year	Apps	Goals
Jamaica	2021	1	0
Total		1	0
