= James Bransgrove =

English footballer (born 1995)

Personal information
- Full name: James Arthur Bransgrove
- Date of birth: 12 May 1995 (age 31)
- Place of birth: Harlow, England
- Height: 1.95 m (6 ft 5 in)
- Position: Goalkeeper

Team information
- Current team: Saffron Walden Town

Youth career
- Leyton Orient
- Buckhurst Hill
- 2011–2012: Waltham Abbey
- 2012–2013: Brentford
- 2013–2014: Colchester United

Senior career*
Years	Team	Apps	(Gls)
2012–2013	Waltham Abbey	6	(0)
2014–2016	Colchester United	1	(0)
2015	→ Bishop's Stortford (loan)	7	(0)
2016	→ Maldon & Tiptree (loan)	6	(0)
2016	→ Wealdstone (loan)	5	(0)
2017	Chelmsford City	0	(0)
2017–2018	Coggeshall Town	52	(0)
2019–2020	Walthamstow	54	(1)
2020	Bowers & Pitsea	0	(0)
2020	Dunmow Town	3	(0)
2020–2021	Saffron Walden Town	12	(0)
2021–2023	Enfield	50	(0)
2023–	Saffron Walden Town	0	(0)

International career
- Scotland U18
- Scotland U21
- * Club domestic league appearances and goals as of 23:42, 14 August 2020 (UTC)

James Arthur Bransgrove (born 12 May 1995) is a retired professional footballer who plays as a goalkeeper for Saffron Walden Town F.C.

Bransgrove was signed by Brentford from Waltham Abbey in 2012, and a year later he was signed to Colchester United's Academy. After helping Colchester's under-18s to league and cup success, he progressed into the under-21 development squad while experiencing loans away from Colchester with Bishop's Stortford, Maldon & Tiptree and Wealdstone. He made his professional debut for Colchester in May 2016. He announced his retirement from professional football at the age of 21 in December 2016 to pursue a career in business.

== Club career ==
Born in Harlow, Bransgrove was signed by Brentford from Waltham Abbey at the age of 17. He joined Colchester United's Academy from Brentford in the summer of 2013 and impressed in the under-18 side at Colchester. He received a call-up to the Scotland under-18 side following an unbeaten start to the 2013–14 season. The season ended in glory for the under-18 side as Bransgrove helped them to a league title and cup winning double. He made several important saves in the Youth Alliance Cup final on 29 April 2014 during Colchester's 4–2 win against Bradford City at Valley Parade.

Bransgrove made the step-up to the under-21 development squad in the 2014–15 season, where early on he made a crucial penalty save during Colchester's 3–2 win against his old club Brentford at Florence Park. He also provided an assist for Drey Wright after he latched on to Bransgrove's long goal kick. He was named on the first-team bench for the first time on 9 November 2014 for Colchester's FA Cup first round clash against Gosport Borough, although he was unused during the 6–3 win. He joined Conference South side Bishop's Stortford on 12 March 2015 and impressed on his debut during a 0–0 draw with Sutton United. After making seven league appearances for the club, he was recalled early by Colchester during the midst of a goalkeeper injury crisis. As a result, Bransgrove was again named on the first-team bench for Colchester when they were beaten 6–0 by Chesterfield on 14 April.

Bransgrove signed a new one-year deal with Colchester in the summer of 2015, but was then ruled out for several months following knee surgery. He made a return to action in December 2015 in the Essex Senior Cup as Colchester saw off Canvey Island on penalties. He was named on the bench again for Colchester's 3–2 FA Cup win against Altrincham on 6 December, before he was sent out on loan to Maldon & Tiptree for one month on 22 January 2016. He made six league appearances and one cup appearance for the Jammers. He was then loaned out again on 4 March to Wealdstone for one month, where he made five appearances. He signed a new three-year contract with Colchester on 27 April 2016.

Despite dislocating his finger in training earlier in the week, Bransgrove was handed his professional debut by Colchester caretaker manager Steve Ball on 8 May 2016. Fellow Colchester goalkeeper Dillon Barnes missed his own opportunity to make his professional debut after getting caught in traffic, meaning Bransgrove was selected for the game ahead of the absent Barnes. He conceded two goals as the U's lost their final game of the season 2–1 against Rochdale.

Bransgrove made his first appearance of the 2016–17 season on 4 October in Colchester's 2–1 defeat to Southampton U23 in the EFL Trophy.

In December 2016, Bransgrove announced that he was to retire from professional football in order to pursue a career in business, having undertaken a Business Management degree with the Open University.

In March 2017, Bransgrove signed for Chelmsford City as backup to regular goalkeeper Ross Fitzsimons.

Bransgrove signed for Coggeshall Town for the 2017–18 season, making 35 league appearances as the club won the Eastern Counties League.

In January 2019, Bransgrove left Coggeshall Town and signed for Walthamstow. He scored one goal for Walthamstow, coming on as a substitute to play outfield against Tower Hamlets in the Errington Challenge Cup. He transferred to Bowers & Pitsea in February 2020.

Ahead of the 2020–21 season, Bransgrove joined newly formed Essex and Suffolk Border League club Dunmow Town.

== International career ==
Bransgrove was called up to a Scotland under-18 training camp in November 2013 after helping his Colchester United under-18 side to twelve wins out of twelve during the 2013–14 season. He was called up to the under-21 side for the first time in August 2016 for Scotland's games against Macedonia and Ukraine.

== Career statistics ==
As of match played 8 February 2020

Appearances and goals by club, season and competition
Club	Season	League			FA Cup		League Cup		Other		Total	
Club	Season	Division	Apps	Goals	Apps	Goals	Apps	Goals	Apps	Goals	Apps	Goals
Waltham Abbey	2012–13	Isthmian League First Division North	6	0	―		―		―		6	0
	Total		6	0	―		―		―		6	0
Colchester United	2014–15	League One	0	0	0	0	0	0	0	0	0	0
Colchester United	2015–16	League One	1	0	0	0	0	0	0	0	1	0
Colchester United	2016–17	League Two	0	0	0	0	0	0	1 (Note: Appearance in EFL Trophy)	0	1	0
Colchester United	Total		1	0	0	0	0	0	1	0	2	0
Bishop's Stortford (loan)	2014–15	Conference South	7	0	―		―		―		7	0
Maldon & Tiptree (loan)	2015–16	Isthmian League First Division North	6	0	―		―		1 (Note: Appearance in Tolleshunt D'Arcy Cup)	0	7	0
Wealdstone (loan)	2015–16	National League South	5	0	―		―		―		5	0
Chelmsford City	2016–17	National League South	0	0	―		―		―		0	0
Coggeshall Town	2017–18	Eastern Counties League	41	0	―		―		―		41	0
Coggeshall Town	2018–19	Isthmian League First Division North	11	0	6	0	―		3 (Note: 1 appearance in FA Trophy, 1 appearance in Isthmian League Cup, 1 appearance in Essex Senior Cup)	0	20	0
Coggeshall Town	Total		52	0	6	0	―		3	0	80	0
Walthamstow	2018–19	Essex Senior League	18	0	―		―		2 (Note: 1 appearance in Gordon Brasted Memorial Trophy, 1 appearance in Errington Challenge Cup)	0	20	0
Walthamstow	2019–20	Essex Senior League	22	0	5	0	―		6 (Note: 2 appearances in FA Vase, 1 appearance in Gordon Brasted Memorial Trophy, 1 appearance in Peter Butcher Memorial Trophy, 1 appearance in Essex Thameside Trophy, 1 appearance and 1 goal in Errington Challenge Cup)	1	33	1
Walthamstow	Total		40	0	5	0	―		8	1	53	1
Bowers & Pitsea	2019–20	Isthmian League Premier Division	0	0	―		―		―		0	0
Career total			117	0	11	0	0	0	13	0	141	1

== Honours ==
Colchester United U18

- 2013–14 Football League Youth Alliance South East winner
- 2013–14 Football League Youth Alliance Cup winner

Coggeshall Town FC

- 2017–18 Eastern Counties Football League winner
