= Leo Chambers =

English footballer (born 1995)

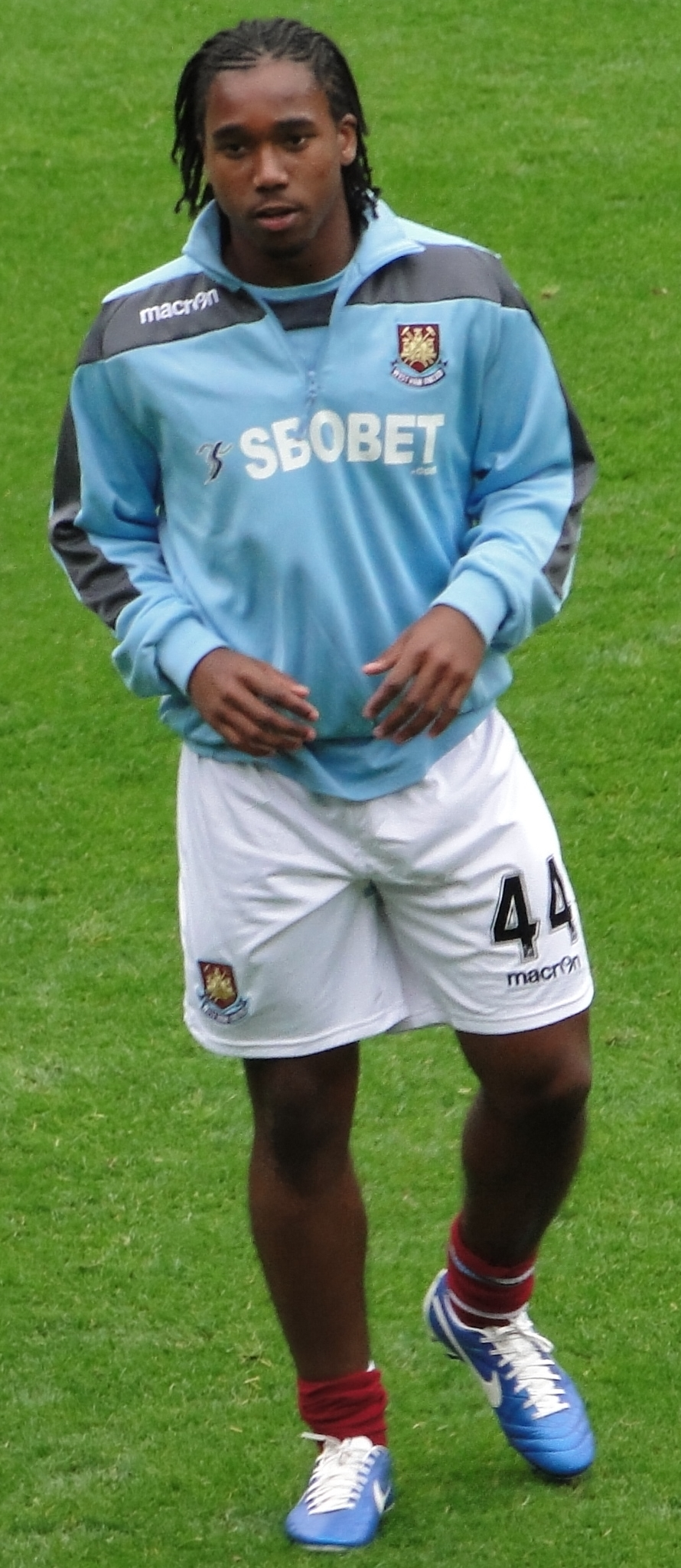
- Chambers warming-up for West Ham United

Personal information
- Full name: Leo Alexander Chambers
- Date of birth: 5 August 1995 (age 31)
- Place of birth: Brixton, England
- Height: 1.86 m (6 ft 1 in)
- Position: Defender

Youth career
- Afewee Academy
- 2002–2012: West Ham United

Senior career*
Years	Team	Apps	(Gls)
2012–2016	West Ham United	0	(0)
2016	→ Colchester United (loan)	6	(0)
2017–2018	Billericay Town	8	(0)
2018	→ Kingstonian (loan)	5	(0)
2018	→ Kingstonian (loan)	6	(0)
2018–2019	Kingstonian	5	(0)
2019	→ Farnborough (loan)	2	(0)
Total		32	(0)

International career^{‡}
2010–2011	England U16	3	(0)
2011–2012	England U17	8	(1)
2012	England U18	1	(0)
2013	England U19	1	(1)
- * Club domestic league appearances and goals as of 17:41, 31 March 2019 (UTC) ‡ National team caps and goals as of 18:30, 5 September 2013 (UTC)

Leo Alexander Chambers (born 5 August 1995) is a retired English footballer who last played as a defender for Kingstonian. He has also played for Colchester United on loan and for England at under-16, under-17 and under-18 levels.

== Club career ==
Born in Brixton, London, Chambers was a youth team player with West Ham before signing his first professional contract in August 2012 having joined the club aged seven. His first appearance in a first-team squad was on 20 October 2012 when he was an unused substitute in a Premier League game against Southampton. Chambers made his debut playing at right back for West Ham on 27 August 2013 in the 2–1 League Cup win against Cheltenham Town. He also started in the subsequent victories against Cardiff City and Burnley.

On 26 February 2016, Chambers signed on a one-month loan with Colchester United. He made his Colchester United and Football League debut on 27 February 2016 impressing in a home 0–0 draw with Shrewsbury Town.

In August 2017, Chambers signed for Isthmian Premier League club Billericay Town on a two-year deal. On 7 January 2018, Kingstonian signed Chambers on a 28 day-loan.

In May 2018, Chambers returned to Kingstonian on a permanent basis following two loan spells at the club. In March 2019, Chambers was loaned to Farnborough for a month.

Following his time at Kingstonian, Chambers retired from football due to injuries.

== International career ==
Chambers has played for England at under-16, under-17 and under-18 levels. He made his debut for the under-18 side on 24 October 2012 when, as captain, he was part of a side which beat Italy under-18s 2–0. On 5 September 2013 he made his first appearance for England at U19 level in the victory over Estonia.

== Career statistics ==
As of 20 April 2017

Appearances and goals by club, season and competition
Club	Season	League			FA Cup		League Cup		Other		Total	
Club	Season	Division	Apps	Goals	Apps	Goals	Apps	Goals	Apps	Goals	Apps	Goals
West Ham United	2013–14	Premier League	0	0	0	0	3	0	0	0	3	0
West Ham United	2014–15	Premier League	0	0	0	0	0	0	0	0	0	0
West Ham United	2015–16	Premier League	0	0	0	0	0	0	0	0	0	0
West Ham United	Total		0	0	0	0	3	0	0	0	3	0
Colchester United (loan)	2015–16	League One	6	0	–		–		–		6	0
Career total			6	0	0	0	3	0	0	0	9	0
