= 2015–16 Colchester United F.C. season =

Colchester United
2015–16 season
- Owner: Robbie Cowling
- Chairman: Robbie Cowling
- Manager: Tony Humes (until 26 November); Richard Hall & John McGreal (interim) (26 November to 2 December); Wayne Brown (caretaker) (2 December to 21 December); Kevin Keen (21 December to 26 April); David Wright (caretaker) (26 April to 4 May); Steve Ball (caretaker) (4 May to 8 May)
- Stadium: Colchester Community Stadium
- League One: 23rd (relegated)
- FA Cup: 4th round (eliminated by Tottenham Hotspur)
- League Cup: 1st round (eliminated by Reading)
- Football League Trophy: 1st round (eliminated by Northampton Town)
- Top goalscorer: League: George Moncur (12); All: George Moncur (14)
- Highest home attendance: 9,920 v Tottenham Hotspur, 30 January 2016
- Lowest home attendance: 2,493 v Fleetwood Town, 19 January 2016
- Average home league attendance: 4,299
Home colours	Away colours	Third colours

The 2015–16 season was Colchester United's 79th season in their history and their eighth consecutive season in League One, the third tier of English football. Along with competing in League One, the club also participated in the FA Cup, League Cup and Football League Trophy. The club suffered relegation to League Two, the fourth tier of English football, for the first time in 18-years after finishing the season in 23rd position and in the relegation zone. Colchester made an early exit in the League Cup at the hands of Reading, while they made the fourth round of the FA Cup for the first time in ten years but were defeated by Premier League side Tottenham Hotspur 4–1.

The season was notable for managerial changes. Tony Humes began the season in charge, but after a string of successive defeats, he left by mutual consent in November. Richard Hall and John McGreal took temporary charge for one match before they were replaced by Wayne Brown. Kevin Keen took up the reins in December but was unable to transform the U's fortunes, and they were relegated under his stewardship. He left with two games of the season after relegation was confirmed, and his assistant David Wright was placed in the caretaker position. McGreal was then named Keen's permanent successor ahead of the final game of the season, but would not take charge until the season had ended. This meant McGreal's new assistant manager, Steve Ball, managed the side for the last game of 2015–16.

== Season overview ==
=== Preseason ===
Just two days after Colchester United had secured their League One status for another year, the club began making changes to its playing staff. Following his public disagreement with manager Tony Humes in February 2015 when substituted in the game against Doncaster Rovers, Sean Clohessy had his contract terminated just one year into his two-year deal, having made 37 appearances for the club and captained the side. Following him out the exit door was Dominic Smith, who made his one and only first-team appearance in Humes' first game in charge against Walsall in September 2014, following the expiry of his one-year deal.

Three players extended their contracts with Colchester on 8 May, with Jack Curtis, Byron Lawrence and Michael O'Donoghue all remaining with the club for a further year. After featuring for the club eight times during the 2014–15 season, recently released Rotherham United defender Richard Brindley held talks with Colchester with a view to joining the club on a permanent basis. It was then announced on 15 May that club captain Magnus Okuonghae would not be offered a new deal to remain with the club when his deal expired. Okuonghae, who had spent six years with the U's, played 215 games for the club, but a ruptured achilles tendon early in the previous campaign brought a premature end to his season. Tony Humes described Okuonghae as "an excellent servant to the club". Also leaving the Colchester Community Stadium was Colchester United influential sports scientist Dave Carolan, who headed to Birmingham City to take up a role as the head of sports science for the Championship club. Meanwhile, winger Dion Sembie-Ferris, who made his first-team debut against Cardiff City in the FA Cup third round last season, committed his future to the club by signing a new three-year deal.

Tony Humes continued his clear out of players in preparation for the new season. Leaving the club were winger Sanchez Watt, Jabo Ibehre and academy defender Kevin Lokko, who were all out of contract and out of favour under Humes. Colchester were also considering making offers to former loanees Elliott Hewitt and Matthew Briggs following their release from Ipswich Town and Millwall respectively, while they had also offered a new contract to David Fox following the expiry of his short-term deal with the club.

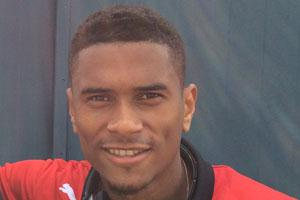
Richard Brindley became Tony Humes' first signing of the summer on 2 June, joining from Rotherham United following his release.

Richard Brindley became the first new signing of the summer on 2 June, joining from Rotherham after his release. He signed a two-year deal with the U's following his loan spell with the club at the end of the 2014–15 season. On 10 June, it was announced that former West Ham United youngster Kieran Bailey had signed a development contract with the club, after he had featured for John McGreal's under-21 squad during the closing stages of the 2014–15 season. Another former loanee signed up with the U's on a permanent basis on 22 June, with Matthew Briggs signing a two-year contract on a free transfer after the expiry of his contract with Millwall. Stand-in captain David Fox decided against signing a new contract with the U's in order to return to the North West of England where his family were situated in late June. Left-back Ben Gordon was allowed to leave the club on 1 July, having been displaced in the first-team by Matthew Briggs last season and his subsequent arrival on a permanent basis. He was one year into a two-year deal.

After rejecting a reduced-terms contract offer with Oldham Athletic, Colchester re-signed George Elokobi on a two-year contract on 3 July, having spent 2004 to 2008 with the U's. Colchester then announced the signing of former Yeovil Town midfielder and captain Joe Edwards on 6 July on a free transfer, joining on a one-year contract with an option of a further year.

After returning for pre-season training on 1 July, the players had their first friendly match at Scraley Road on 11 July against Heybridge Swifts. Humes fielded two different teams in either half, both scoring four and not conceding to hand the U's a comfortable 8–0 win. Chris Porter, who captained the side during the first-half, scored the opening goal after 24 minutes from a Richard Brindley cross. Brindley was again the provider for triallist Olly Lee to score the second soon after. Porter scored his second with a penalty after Dan Holman had been fouled in the area, before George Moncur rounded off the scoring for the first-half. Drey Wright scored from 30 yards to bring the score to 5–0 early in the second-half, with Macauley Bonne then finding the back of the net, and Sammie Szmodics lifting the ball over the onrushing Heybridge goalkeeper. Wright scored his second late on to seal the victory. Colchester played a similar format in their next friendly at Brentwood Town on 14 July, with the same team that played in the final 45 minutes of the win over Heybridge starting against Brentwood, with the only switch between Brindley and Tosin Olufemi. Gavin Massey scored the opening two goals, the first of which was a volley, and the second from a Szmodics pass. Szmodics then scored for himself, with Bonne registering his second of pre-season just one minute later. The U's went in at half-time 4–0 up, and the scores remained the same until the final whistle, with the entire team substituted at half-time for those that started against Heybridge.

After appearing in both of Colchester's pre-season friendlies, it was announced that second year scholar Cameron James had signed a four-year professional contract with the club. Joining the defender in signing was fellow scholar and forward Tariq Issa.

Colchester defeated Bishop's Stortford 3–2 on 18 July, coming from one goal down to win. After Sheldon Sellears opened the scoring for the home side, Colchester hit back through Jack Curtis after the interval. Dan Holman added the U's second, before Macauley Bonne scoring his third goal in three games to wrap up the win for the visitors. Kenzer Lee pulled a goal back for Stortford, but Colchester held on for the victory.

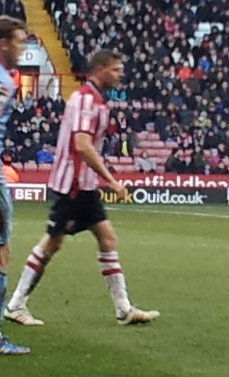
Chris Porter was named as Colchester's new captain on 21 July following Magnus Okuonghae's exit.

Chris Porter was announced as Colchester United's new club captain on 21 July, with Alex Gilbey his vice-captain. This news came ahead of Colchester's first home friendly of the season against West Ham. George Moncur converted a 13th minute free kick to hand the U's a 1–0 win over their Premier League counterparts. Goalkeeper Elliot Parish, who had appeared in all of Colchester's previous friendlies including a full 90 minutes against West Ham, signed a one-year contract with Colchester on 23 July to battle against both Chris Lewington and Sam Walker, who had missed all previous pre-season matches through injury. Development squad goalkeeper James Bransgrove had also been ruled out by injury until September.

The U's suffered their first defeat of pre-season on 25 July when they hosted Leyton Orient at the Community Stadium, losing 3–0 during a game which saw the return of Sam Walker from injury. In the penultimate friendly of pre-season, Colchester welcomed Ipswich to the Community Stadium for their now regular pre-season friendly. Town took the lead through Kévin Bru just before half-time, but Alex Gilbey equalised seven minutes after the restart with a well taken low shot. Ipswich again took the lead on 64 minutes with a penalty from David McGoldrick after Alex Wynter was judged to have handled the ball inside the box. However, Gilbey once again equalised for the U's with a shot from outside the box five minutes from full-time, but there was enough time for Colchester to grab a winner, with Gavin Massey heading the ball in on the line after Jack Curtis' shot had been deflected. The final pre-season friendly was at home to a Fulham XI on 1 August. Played in front of a crowd of just 642, Fulham earned a 1–0 win through Moussa Dembélé, while goalkeeper Sam Walker played 45 minutes in his comeback from injury.

Having been on trial with Colchester during 2014–15 pre-season, midfielder Darren Ambrose joined the club on a one-year contract on 6 August following his release from Ipswich. The final business prior to the start of the campaign came when youngsters Tyler Brampton and David Segura joined David Wright's Maldon & Tiptree on loan. Wide-player Brampton joined for three months, while Spanish forward Segura signed until January 2016.

=== League One ===
==== August ====
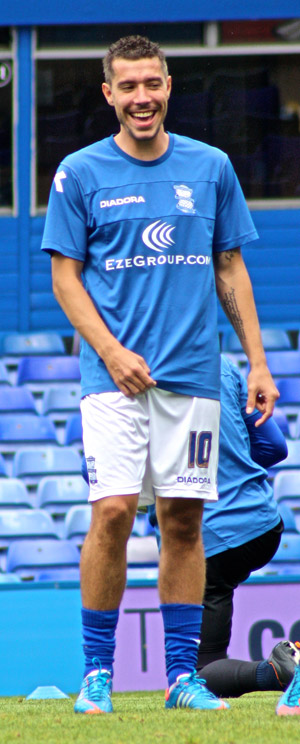
Darren Ambrose made a goalscoring debut for Colchester during their 2–2 opening day draw with Blackpool.

The U's kicked off their League One campaign at home to Blackpool on 8 August. The match saw the debuts of goalkeeper Elliot Parish, Joe Edwards and Darren Ambrose, a second debut for both Matthew Briggs and Richard Brindley, while Kane Vincent-Young was brought on with eleven minutes remaining to make his professional bow. The visitors took an 18th-minute lead through Mark Cullen, but their lead lasted only four minutes with a volley from Alex Gilbey. In first-half injury time, Cullen struck again to put Blackpool 2–1 ahead going into the break. Debutant Darren Ambrose rescued a point for the U's in the second half when he slotted home a Gavin Massey pass on 56 minutes to level the game at 2–2. Following his debut, Vincent-Young signed a two-year contract extension with the club on 14 August. Ahead of Colchester's second league game of the season, out of favour striker Dan Holman was sent out on a month-long loan to National League side Woking.

With Chris Porter ruled out through injury, Macauley Bonne was handed a start in his place for the U's trip to Peterborough United on 15 August. He scored the game's opening goal on 30 minutes, but the lead lasted just one minute before a Marcus Maddison equaliser levelled the scores. Three minutes later and Peterborough were ahead, with Maddison registering his second and proving to be the difference between the two sides. Kane Vincent-Young had more game time after replacing the injured Matthew Briggs prior to half-time in Colchester's 2–1 defeat. The U's followed up their defeat with a goalless draw against Oldham Athletic at the Community Stadium on 18 August.

Colchester's trip to Fleetwood Town on 22 August saw them concede two goals in either half without reply to continue their winless start to the season. Colchester boosted their ranks on 27 August with the signing of former Crystal Palace and Ipswich Town midfielder Owen Garvan on a short-term contract until January, before reinforcing the midfield further with the loan signing of Charlton Athletic winger Callum Harriott on loan until 2 January 2016.

The U's guaranteed a winless start to the new season on 29 August when they fought back from two goals down to draw 2–2 with Scunthorpe United at the Community Stadium. After Kevin van Veen and Paddy Madden had put the visitors two ahead by the 18th minute, George Moncur scored his first goal of the campaign 15 minutes later to reduce the deficit. Colchester left it late to score their leveller. George Elokobi scored his first goal for the club since his summer return with an 81st-minute header from a Harriott corner.

==== September ====
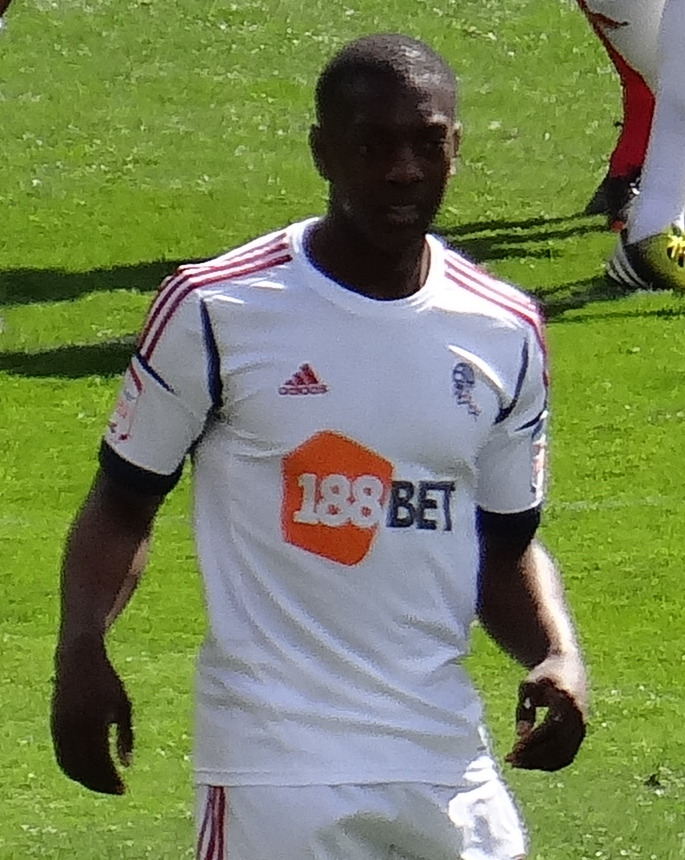
Tony Humes brought in former Burnley striker Marvin Sordell on a free transfer on 10 September.

With the transfer window closing on 1 September, Tony Humes made no further signings, but did tie down promising triallist goalkeeper Dillon Barnes to a permanent contract. However, following Barnes' arrival, Chris Lewington was allowed to leave the club by mutual consent on 3 September after making only two appearances for the club. On 10 September, Colchester brought in forward Marvin Sordell on a contract until the end of the season after his release from Burnley earlier in the month. Sordell's signing was followed up by the loan arrival of Preston North End goalkeeper Jamie Jones on 11 September who joined for 93 days. Colchester's first league match for September followed on 12 September, with both new signings starting. The game was tipped to the U's advantage after 16 minutes when Chesterfield had Drew Talbot sent off, but it was Colchester who were first to concede with defender Daniel Jones putting the home side ahead with a free kick on 22 minutes. The U's responded with Gavin Massey's first goal of the season on 29 minutes, where the scores remained until half-time. In the second half, Colchester fell behind once again when Lee Novak scored from close range, before falling further behind on 74 minutes through captain Sam Morsy. The deficit was reduced two minutes later, with George Moncur scoring his second goal of the season. The game was levelled in added time when Chesterfield defender Charlie Raglan put the ball into his own net to draw the game 3–3.

A late penalty save from Jamie Jones ensured Colchester held on to their lead and their first win of the season on 15 September as they edged out 3–2 winners against Sheffield United at Brammall Lane. George Moncur scored his third and fourth goals of the season to give the away side a 2–0 lead at the interval, but the Blades clawed the score back to 2–2 by the midway point of the second half with a Billy Sharp penalty and a Martyn Woolford equaliser. Marvin Sordell scored his first goal for the club in the 82nd minute to hand the lead back to the U's, before Jones' penalty save after George Elokobi had fouled in the penalty area and received a second yellow card for his efforts. The win moved Colchester up out of the relegation places to 19th position in League One.

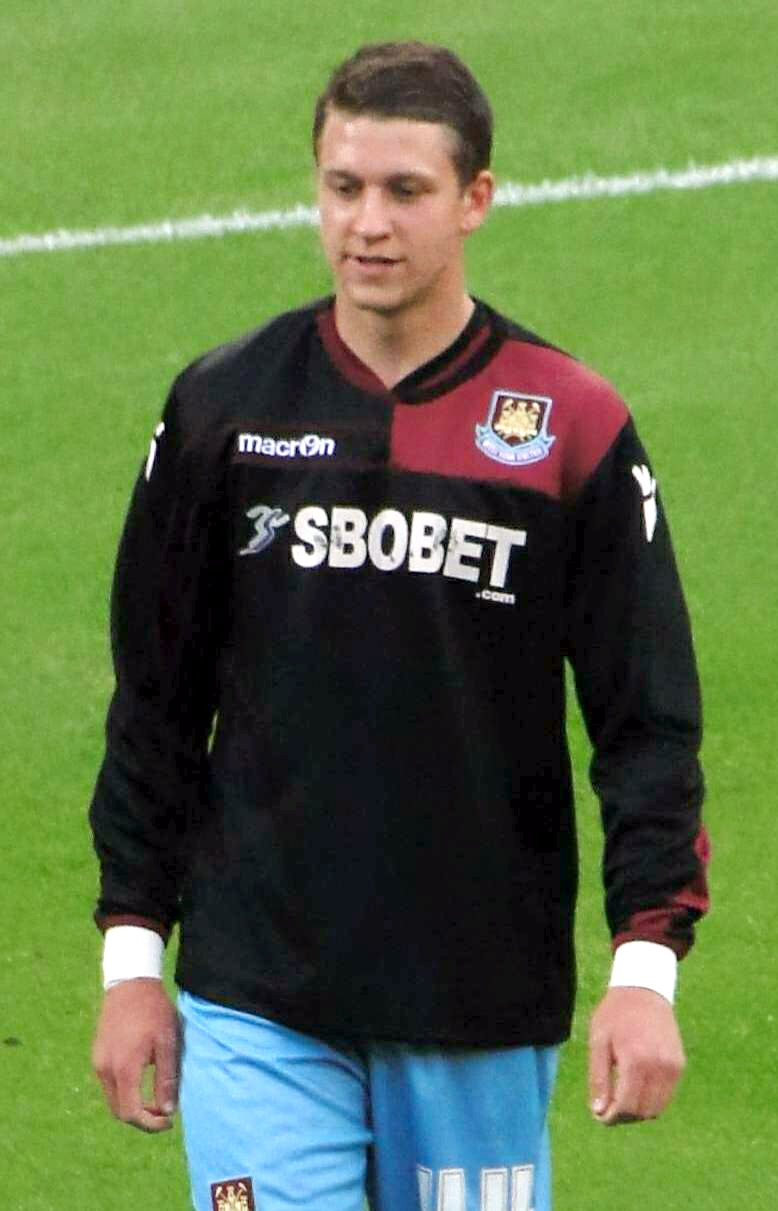
George Moncur's performances throughout September earned him the PFA Fan's Player of the Month award.

Another penalty save from Jamie Jones gifted the U's their first home victory of the campaign on 19 September in their 2–1 win over table-topping Gillingham. Gavin Massey scored his second league goal of the campaign after just four minutes of play, with Callum Harriott providing the assist. Colchester were pegged back only three minutes later when Luke Norris scored. Callum Harriott restored his side's lead on 29 minutes with his first goal for the club. Frankie Kent, making his first league start of the season, conceded a penalty in the 33rd minute of play, but Jones, confident from his match-winning penalty save in the last league game, saved Cody McDonald's effort in the centre of the goal. The scores remained the same through the second-half, with Colchester moving up to 12th in the League One standings and inflicting a first league defeat of the season on Gillingham. Just one month after signing a five-month deal with the club, on 25 September, Owen Garvan signed a contract extension until the summer of 2017.

Colchester recorded their third consecutive win at Swindon Town on 26 September with a 2–1 win. George Moncur scored his fifth goal of the season after just three minutes to hand the U's the lead, before a 22nd-minute equaliser from Town's Wes Thomas. Callum Harriott scored his second goal in as many games to put his side ahead once again three minutes before the interval, while a goalless second half pushed Colchester up to 10th position in League One.

Ahead of Colchester's final game of the month on 29 September, Callum Harriott was named in the Football League Team of the Week for matchday nine on the back of his run of good form and goal against Swindon the previous weekend. There was further good news for two more Colchester players, with both Jamie Jones and George Moncur shortlisted for the PFA Fans Player of the Month award for League One for September.

The U's ensured they went the month of September unbeaten in the league with their fourth consecutive win on 29 September with a 2–0 victory over Bradford City. Callum Harriott made it three goals in three games when he opened the scoring after seven minutes, before Marvin Sordell doubled Colchester's advantage after he was picked out by Owen Garvan. The win moved the team up to eighth position in League One.

George Moncur was named as the PFA's Fans Player of the Month for September on 6 October, seeing off competition from fellow finalists Adam Armstrong of Coventry City and Burton Albion's Stuart Beavon. Meanwhile, boss Tony Humes was nominated for the League One Manager of the Month award on 7 October. He faced competition from Bury's David Flitcroft, Burton Albion's Jimmy Floyd Hasselbaink and Southend United's Phil Brown. Despite losing out on the PFA Fans' Player of the Month award, Jamie Jones was nominated for the league's Player of the Month award. He was in the running against Walsall's forward Tom Bradshaw, Rochdale midfielder Peter Vincenti and Bury's Leon Clarke.

==== October ====
Colchester played hosts to in-from Bury on 3 October. Despite dominating the play, Bury goalkeeper Rob Lainton kept the U's forward line at bay, making saves from Joe Edwards and George Moncur in the first-half. Leon Clarke made the breakthrough for the away side after 75 minutes which they would hold on to, ending the U's winning run. On 10 October, the U's travelled to Shrewsbury Town. During a first half of limited opportunities, Colchester took the lead on 36 minutes when Shrewsbury defender Mark Ellis put the ball into his own net. Three minutes later, Tom Eastman scored his first goal of the season to give his side a 2–0 half-time lead. At the beginning of a poor second-half display for Colchester, Shrewsbury hit back immediately when substitute Tyrone Barnett scored from close range after just 39-seconds of play. He scored again in the 59th minute to level the scores, before fellow half-time substitute Sullay Kaikai gave them the lead. Kaikai scored his second goal in the 81st minute to inflict a 4–2 defeat on Colchester.

Four first-half goals for home side Wigan Athletic dumped Colchester United back into the bottom-half of the League One table on 17 October. The four goals arrived in 28 minutes, before a late fifth ensured a 5–0 defeat for a woeful Colchester. The club returned to winning ways in their home encounter with Port Vale on 20 October, picking up their first win in three games with a 2–1 victory. George Elokobi's second goal of the campaign set the U's on their way, but Vale's Colin Daniel equalised on the stroke of half-time. Marvin Sordell scored midway through the second half to earn his side three points.

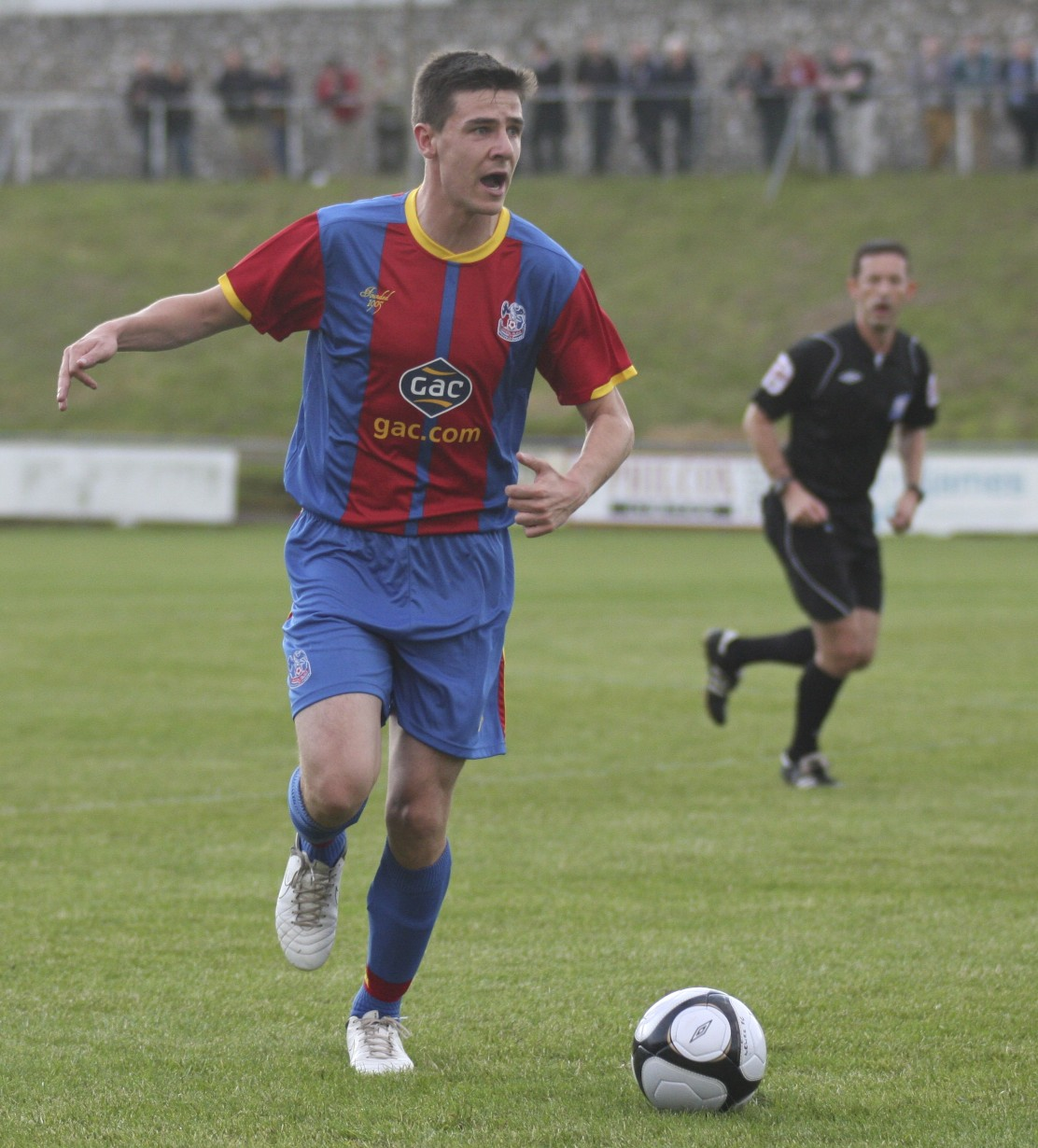
Owen Garvan scored his first goal for Colchester during their 4–4 draw with Walsall on 24 October.

On 24 October, Colchester hosted Walsall at the Community Stadium. The U's found themselves at a two-goal disadvantage within the opening half hour, before they had a goal of their own ruled out for offside. Walsall held onto their lead until four minutes into the second period. George Moncur's sixth goal of the season gave Colchester a lifeline, and three minutes later they equalised with Marvin Sordell's second goal in as many matches. Walsall reinstated their advantage on 57 minutes, but three minutes later United were again level after Owen Garvan scored his first goal for the club. Ten minutes from time, the U's took the lead for the first time in the game when Darren Ambrose scored. They held the lead until the first minute of stoppage time, when Walsall equalised through James O'Connor, resulting in a 4–4 draw. Darren Ambrose's performance in the match earned him a place in the Football League 'Team of the Week' after his goal and two assists.

After struggling to make an impression in the first-team this term, Sammie Szmodics was loaned out to National League club Braintree Town on 30 October in an initial month-long deal.

Colchester travelled to Doncaster Rovers for their final fixture of the month on 31 October. The U's defensive frailties once again showed as they were beaten 2–0 by a goal in either half of the match.

==== November ====
On the back of their FA Cup first round win, the U's hosted Coventry City on 14 November, who held former Colchester loanee Jacob Murphy amongst their ranks. The home side took the lead in the 17th minute, with Macauley Bonne scoring his eight goal of the season following his four-goal haul against Wealdstone. Murphy equalised for the visitors on 32 minutes, before putting Coventry ahead five minutes prior to the interval. The game was sealed in City's favour four minutes after the restart when Marc-Antoine Fortuné scored to deliver a 3–1 win to Coventry. Colchester lost their third successive league game on 21 November when they visited Millwall. Having trailed 2–0 at the break, half-time substitute Chris Porter scored his first goal of the season to reduce the deficit, but two further goals for the home side dealt the U's a 4–1 defeat. Another defeat followed on 24 November as the U's fell to a late 3–2 home loss to bottom of the league Crewe Alexandra despite having held a 2–0 lead. Callum Harriott's fourth goal for the club put the U's ahead on 40 minutes, before the lead was doubled by George Moncur's eighth of the season. Crewe pulled one goal back through Ryan Colclough on 61 minutes, before they equalised through Marcus Haber with ten minutes remaining. Loanee Ryan Lowe scored Crewe's winning goal in the second minute of injury time.

On the back of seven defeats in nine League One games and the 3–2 home defeat by Crewe, manager Tony Humes was dismissed by the club on 26 November, with Richard Hall and John McGreal taking temporary charge. The newly installed management team immediately recalled Sammie Szmodics from his Braintree Town loan on 27 November ahead of Colchester's trip to Burton Albion. The pair took charge of first team affairs for Colchester's first ever trip to high-flying Burton Albion on 28 November. Their side had the best-possible start when Callum Harriott opened the scoring for the away team just four-minutes into the match. Burton equalised after 24-minutes through Abdenasser El Khayati, before they took the lead in the 34th minute through Birmingham City loanee Mark Duffy. Burton extended their lead six-minutes into the second-half through Tom Naylor, and Lucas Akins made it 4–1 on 72 minutes. Timmy Thiele completed the rout on 81-minutes to ensure a fifth consecutive league defeat for the club.

==== December ====
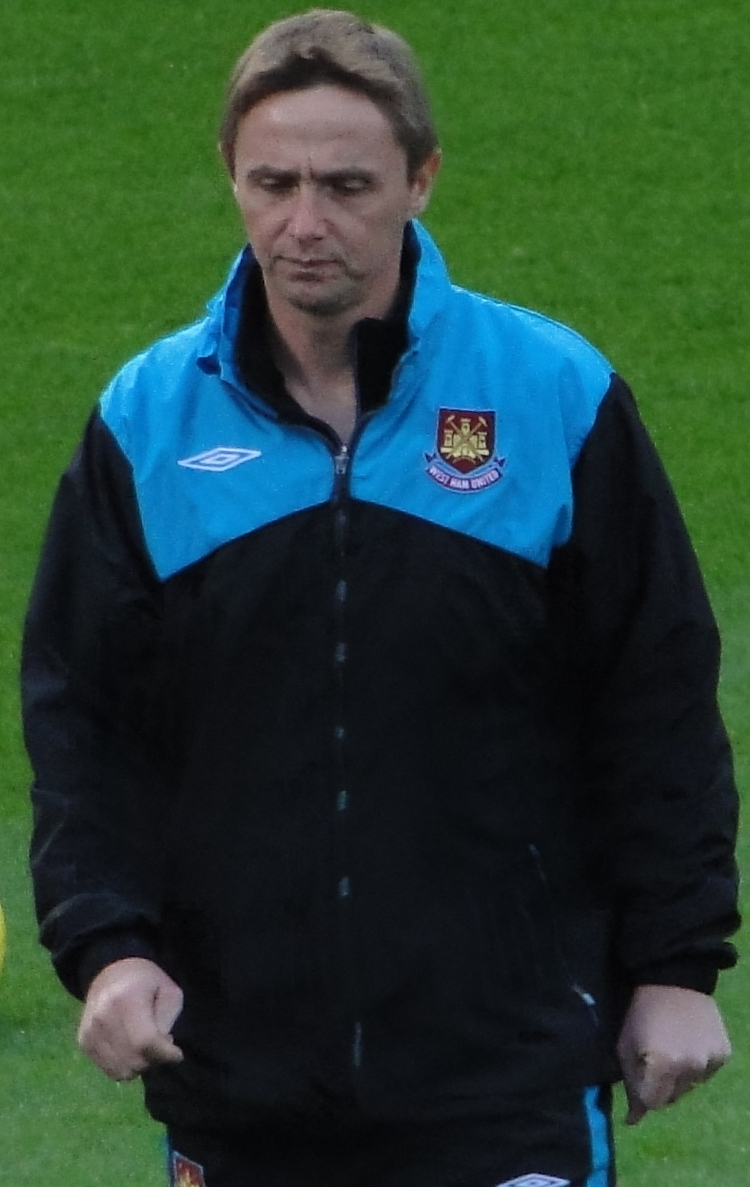
Kevin Keen was named as the new Colchester United manager on 21 December.

Chairman Robbie Cowling decided to install a caretaker manager on 2 December in the shape of former U's defender and under-18 coach Wayne Brown, with McGreal assisting while Hall would remain with the club. Following their FA Cup victory, Brown's first league match in charge resulted in a sixth consecutive defeat for the U's on 12 December. On the hour mark, Colchester found themselves 3–0 down at the Community Stadium against Barnsley after goals from Conor Hourihane, Adam Hammill and Ivan Toney. A spirited fight-back saw Colchester reduce the deficit to one goal after two goals in three minutes from George Moncur and Chris Porter, but they couldn't find an equaliser. The result saw the club drop into the relegation zone for the first time since the winless start to the season.

Following Wayne Brown's withdrawal from the running to be the next Colchester United manager, the club hit the bottom of the table on 19 December after a 3–1 defeat away to Rochdale. The U's had taken the lead through Chris Porter after 21-minutes, who scored his second goal in as many games, before ex-Colchester man Ian Henderson equalised from the penalty spot on 30-minutes. Four minutes later, the home side took a 2–1 lead through Donal McDermott and Olly Lancashire sealed the win midway through the second-half.

Colchester named former Reading and West Bromwich Albion assistant manager Kevin Keen as manager on 21 December, with David Wright promoted to assistant after working as both a coach for the club and part-time manager of Maldon & Tiptree. With the news of a new managerial appointment, the injured Sam Walker signed a 2 1/2-year contract extension on 22 December to remain with the club until the summer of 2018.

In his first match in charge, Keen oversaw the Boxing Day Essex derby match against Southend United. After a goalless first-half, two former Colchester players scored against their old club to hand Southend a 2–0 victory. First, John White, a Colchester United youth team product, scored an elusive goal for the visitors on 49-minutes, only his third career goal. Then, on 73 minutes, former loanee Dave Mooney scored after George Elokobi was robbed of the ball. In the final game of 2015, Colchester ensured they equalled a club-record nine consecutive league defeats after another former Colchester loanee, Dominic Samuel, scored the only goal of the game in a close affair with Gillingham at Priestfield on 28 December.

==== January ====
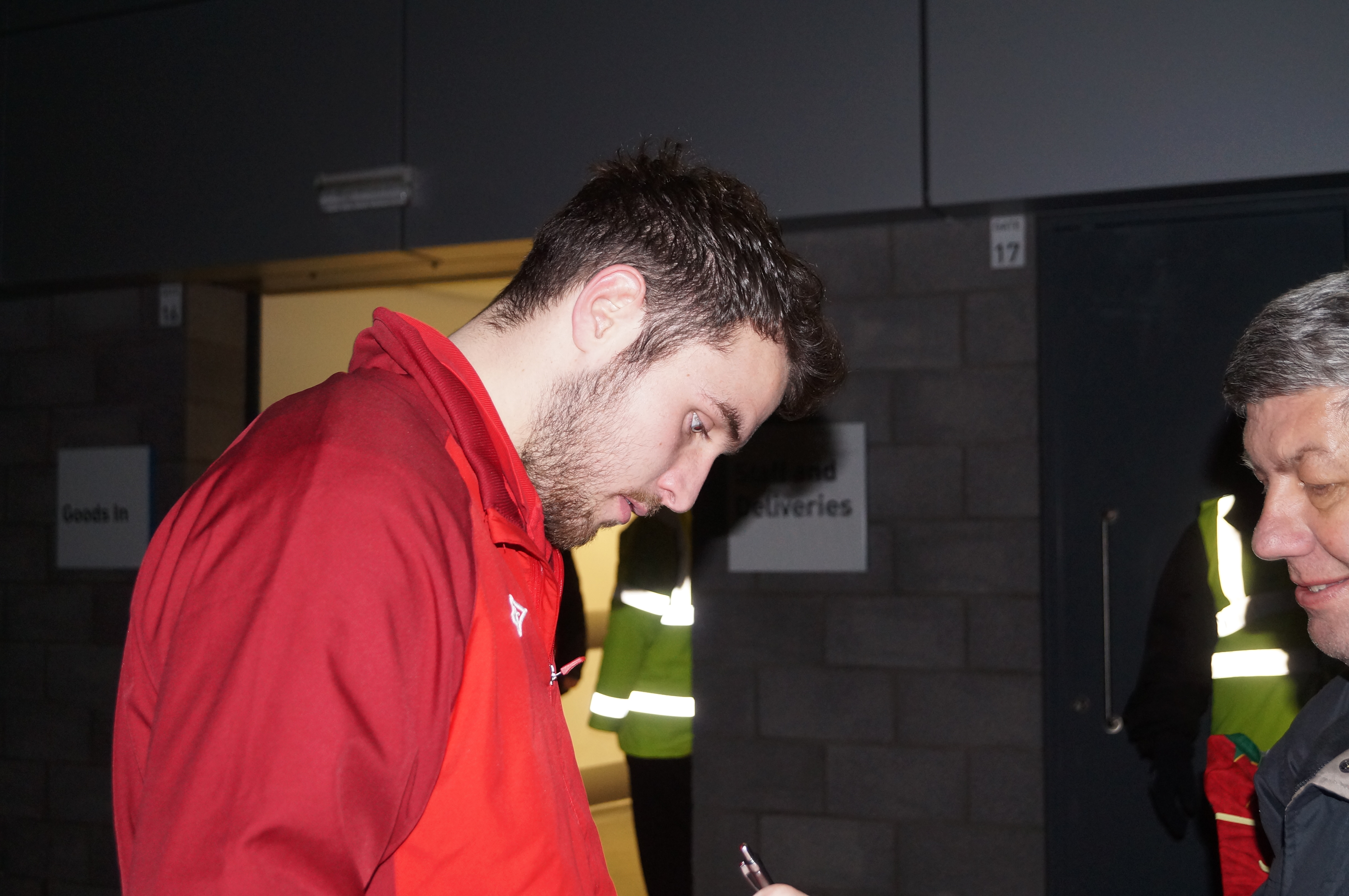
Goalkeeper Jake Kean became Kevin Keen's first signing as Colchester manager, joining on loan from Norwich City on 7 January.

January started on a better note for Colchester, earning a 1–1 draw away to Oldham Athletic on 2 January 2016 which moved them off the foot of the table. Rhys Murphy opened the scoring for Oldham after just five minutes, but a late Chris Porter strike against his former club ensured Colchester could not earn an unwanted record of ten consecutive league defeats. Keen's first transfer movements of the January window occurred on 5 January, with Dan Holman allowed to leave the club on a free transfer, joining National League leaders Cheltenham Town. He made his first signing of the transfer window on 7 January, bringing in Norwich City's reserve goalkeeper Jake Kean on an initial 28-day loan deal. Meanwhile, youth-team member Marley Andrews was loaned out to Steve Ball's Maldon & Tiptree for one month. The club tied down the promising Louis Dunne, son of former U's manager and player Joe Dunne, to a three-year development contract on 14 January.

Colchester continued their winless run in the league on 16 January. With the U's having not registered a win in League One in three months, they welcomed Sheffield United to the Community Stadium, and buoyed by their FA Cup victory over Charlton a week prior, Colchester looked to capitalise on this and push on with their faltering league season. The Blades opened the scoring on 20-minutes through Billy Sharp, who had scored in the reverse fixture earlier in the campaign. After the break, the U's equalised when Tom Eastman headed in Marvin Sordell's cross. A point looked to be on the cards for Colchester, but for Chris Basham, who scored a 91st-minute winner for the away side. On 18 January, the U's saw one arrival and one exit. Incoming was former West Ham loanee Elliot Lee, who joined for his second spell with the club until the end of the season. Leaving by mutual consent was Byron Lawrence, who after just one first-team appearance left the club by mutual consent. The following day, Fleetwood Town were the visitors in a 1–1 draw. Alex Gilbey scored the opening goal on 38 minutes, before Eggert Jónsson equalised on the hour mark. The scores remained, and Colchester moved up to 22nd in the League One table, five points from Fleetwood in 20th position and safety.

Kevin Keen made his first permanent signing on 20 January, bringing in former England international defender Nicky Shorey on a deal until the end of the season. While James Bransgrove became the latest player to join Maldon & Tiptree on loan on 22 January, it was reported that the club had turned down an offer for Alex Gilbey from Championship side Bristol City. Keen later described the offer for Gilbey as "a joke".

Colchester were cast further from safety on 23 January after they were beaten 3–0 away to Scunthorpe United. Three goals in the space of eight second-half minutes for the home side left the U's seven points from Shrewsbury in 20th-position.

==== February ====
With Norwich loanee Jake Kean returning to his parent club due to "a couple of things" he was unhappy with at Colchester United, goalkeeper Elliot Parish once again returned to first-team action for the U's in their Essex derby away fixture with Southend. Despite losing Alex Gilbey after 36 minutes having been sent off for a challenge on Southend's Ryan Leonard, Colchester put in a solid defensive display against their county neighbour with only ten men. The defence soaked up the pressure until the 82nd minute, when former Colchester player Anthony Wordsworth struck with a 20-yard effort. A short while later, the home side's lead was doubled when Adam Barrett headed in Jack Payne's corner kick. Barrett celebrated by running the length of the pitch to celebrate in front of the Colchester fans. With tensions rising between the two sets of supporters, a lone Southend fan jumped onto the pitch, ran towards the away fans and began throwing punches into the crowd. Other Southend supporters followed by jumping onto the pitch before stewards and some players attempted to defuse the situation, while police said that an investigation into the incident would be launched. Southend added a third goal in the third minute of injury time when on-loan Southampton winger Sam McQueen scored from close range.

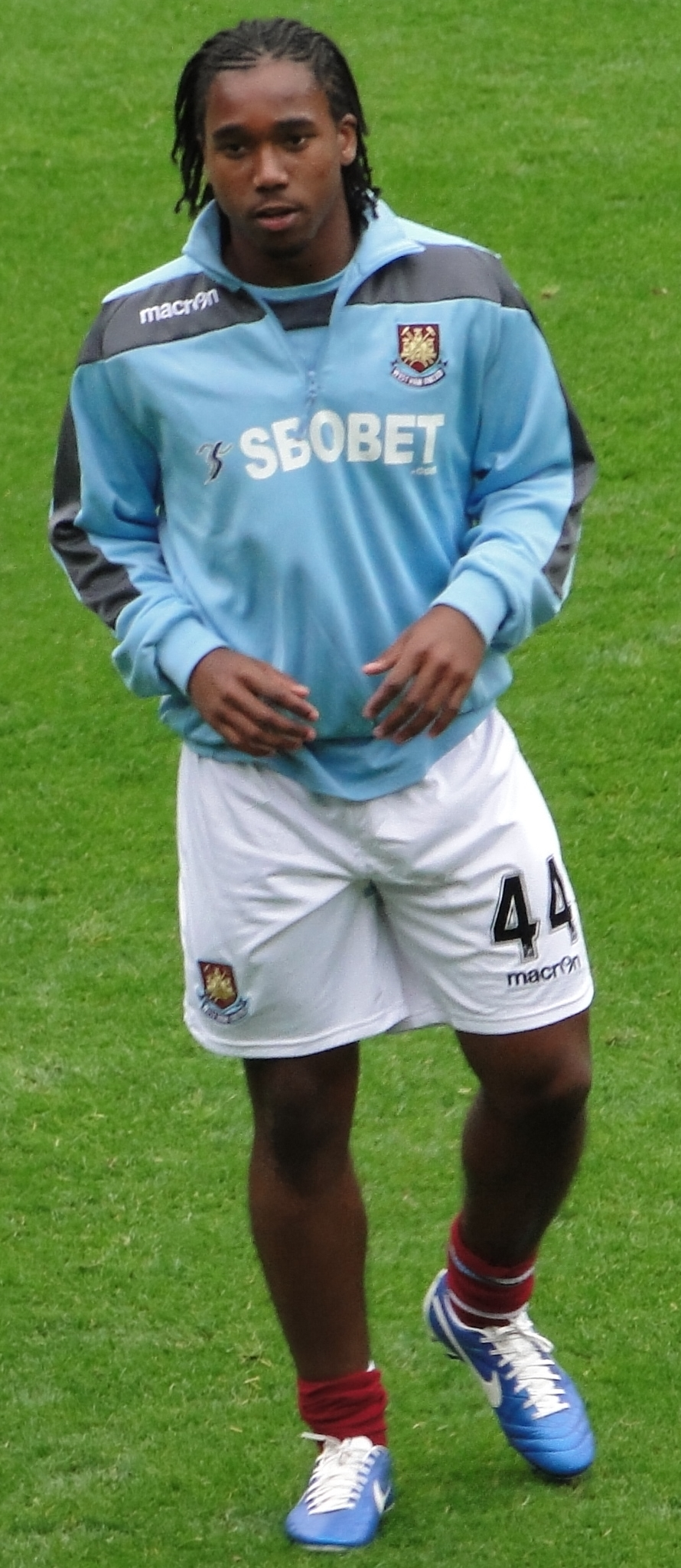
Leo Chambers arrived as defensive reinforcement on loan from West Ham United on 26 February.

Colchester extended their winless run to 16 league games on 13 February with the visit of Swindon to the Community Stadium. Two Nicky Ajose goals, in the 36th and 56th minutes, put the visitors two ahead, before Michael Doughty added a third two minutes later. A half-volley from Joe Edwards saw him score his first goal for the club after 64 minutes to give the U's some hope, but Doughty would strike again in the 72nd minute to inflict a 4–1 defeat on Colchester. In the home encounter with Chesterfield on 16 February, the U's looked to capitalise on an early red card for Chesterfield's Gary Liddle after a foul on Kane Vincent-Young. They took the lead through Macauley Bonne on 69 minutes, but the lead lasted just three minutes when Lee Novak equalised from the penalty spot after Richard Brindley brought Ollie Banks down in the area. The score remained at 1–1 with Colchester remaining bottom of the league and eight points from safety.

On the back of his move from Maldon & Tiptree, Femi Akinwande was given a squad number of 16 on 19 February when he was named in the U's squad to travel to Bury for their fixture on 20 February. The same day, Keen announced that Owen Garvan would take over the club captaincy from Chris Porter "for the foreseeable future" and to "take a little of the responsibility off him [Porter]".

Colchester on 20 February took a 2–0 lead after 17 minutes of their game at Bury. Having been relieved of his captaincy duties, Chris Porter scored after four minutes of play. Gavin Massey then doubled the visitors' lead, but a second yellow card for Tom Eastman after 33 minutes reduced Colchester to ten men. From the resultant free-kick, Ryan Lowe scored against Colchester having scored against the U's for Crewe while on loan earlier in the season. Colchester held on to their 2–1 lead through half-time, but conceded twice in the space of one minute to two Andrew Tutte efforts. Craig Jones added a fourth for Bury after 56 minutes, before Tutte sealed his hat-trick in the 62nd minute to inflict a 5–2 defeat on Colchester.

With Tom Eastman suspended following his red card at Bury, reinforcements arrived from West Ham on 26 February, with Leo Chambers joining for an initial month-long loan, while Tottenham winger Nathan Oduwa also signed for a month. Chambers started Colchester's home match with Shrewsbury on 27 February, while Oduwa was introduced as an 82nd-minute substitute for Gavin Massey as the sides drew 0–0.

==== March ====
On 1 March, it was announced that Tony Humes would be making a return to the club as of 7 March in a director of football role, with Tony Ashby taking up the position of football operations manager. After 19 League One games without a victory, Colchester finally broke their duck on 1 March during their away trip to Bradford City. Colchester were the first to concede, with play-off chasing Bradford striking first in the 17th minute through Wes Thomas. The home side's lead lasted just six minutes when Darren Ambrose's volleyed shot earned the U's an equaliser. He then struck again in the 57th minute to give Colchester a long-awaited victory, but despite the win, the club remained ten points from safety.

Colchester fell back into familiar ways with a 2–0 away defeat at Port Vale on 5 March. A goal in either half ensured the U's remained bottom of the table. Keen was moments away from picking up a second league win on 12 March at home to Wigan Athletic but for a last minute equaliser from Will Grigg. Handing a professional debut to Femi Akinwande, Keen's Colchester side fell behind to Wigan on 36-minutes when Yanic Wildschut scored, but four minutes later, Alex Gilbey equalised with a long-range strike. The U's went into half-time 2–1 down, conceding one minute before the interval to a Ryan Colclough goal who had already scored for Crewe against Colchester earlier in the season. Elliot Lee scored his first goal in his second spell with the club to level the score at 2–2 on 50-minutes, and ten minutes later George Moncur scored for the first time in two-months from the penalty spot after being fouled by Reece Wabara. Louis Dunne replaced Lee to make his professional debut after 77-minutes before Grigg scored the late equaliser.

Another precious win was cruelly stolen from Colchester by Walsall on 19 March at the Bescot Stadium when two goals in the final minutes of the game for the home side consigned the U's to a 2–1 defeat. Alex Gilbey headed in Owen Garvan's cross in first-half injury time to five the visitors a lead which they would hold onto until the 89th-minute. Tom Bradshaw equalised before defender Matt Preston's shot in the fourth minute of added time found the back of the net.

Several loan transfer movements were made ahead of the Easter weekend. On 23 March, youngsters Tyler Brampton and Joe Tennent joined Isthmian League Premier Division side Grays Athletic. Brampton's second loan of the season would see him remain with Grays until the end of the campaign, while Tennent made his first move away from Colchester on work experience. Meanwhile, Dion Sembie-Ferris was also allowed to leave the club on a temporary basis having not made an appearance in the first-team under Kevin Keen. He joined National League South outfit Margate until the end of the season on 24 March.

Colchester were lifted from the foot of the table for the first time in nine games on 25 March after beating Doncaster Rovers 4–1 at the Community Stadium. Doncaster took the lead after-21 minutes through Gary McSheffrey after Frankie Kent had been introduced to replace the injured Leo Chambers. A stirring second-half performance saw Colchester first equalise when Chris Porter netted in the 62nd minute and then take the lead through Elliot Lee on 71-minutes. One minute later, Alex Gilbey scored his third goal in three games to put the U's 3–1 up and there was still time for substitute Richard Brindley to score his first ever league goal three minutes from time. The U's then picked up their first back-to-back wins since September on 29 March as they overcame Coventry by a single goal at the Ricoh Arena. Gavin Massey scored the decisive goal in the 1–0 win. The win came on the back of news of West Ham loanee Leo Chambers extending his loan deal until the end of the season.

Colchester's result against Coventry earned the club the League Managers Association 'Performance of the Week' award, as voted by the panel consisting of LMA chairman Howard Wilkinson, Alex Ferguson, Joe Royle, Dave Bassett and Barry Fry. Keen was also nominated for the League One 'Manager of the Month' award for March.

==== April ====
Colchester's first match in April was a home game with play-off hopefuls Millwall. In a match where the U's had the better of the chances, the game ended 0–0 meaning Colchester remained seven points adrift of safety with six games remaining. On 9 April, a Chris Porter goal proved to be the difference between Colchester and Blackpool as the U's won their third match in four games at Bloomfield Road. Then Colchester's survival hopes were dealt a blow when, despite having the better of the game they were defeated 4–1 by Peterborough United on 16 April to leave them nine-points adrift. Jon Taylor's goal put the visitors in the lead after just two-minutes before George Moncur had a penalty saved by Peterborough goalkeeper Ben Alnwick. In the second-half, two goals in two minutes put Peterborough 3–0 up, before Moncur pulled a goal back. The scoring was complete in the fourth minute of injury time when Marcus Maddison scored his third goal of the season against the U's.

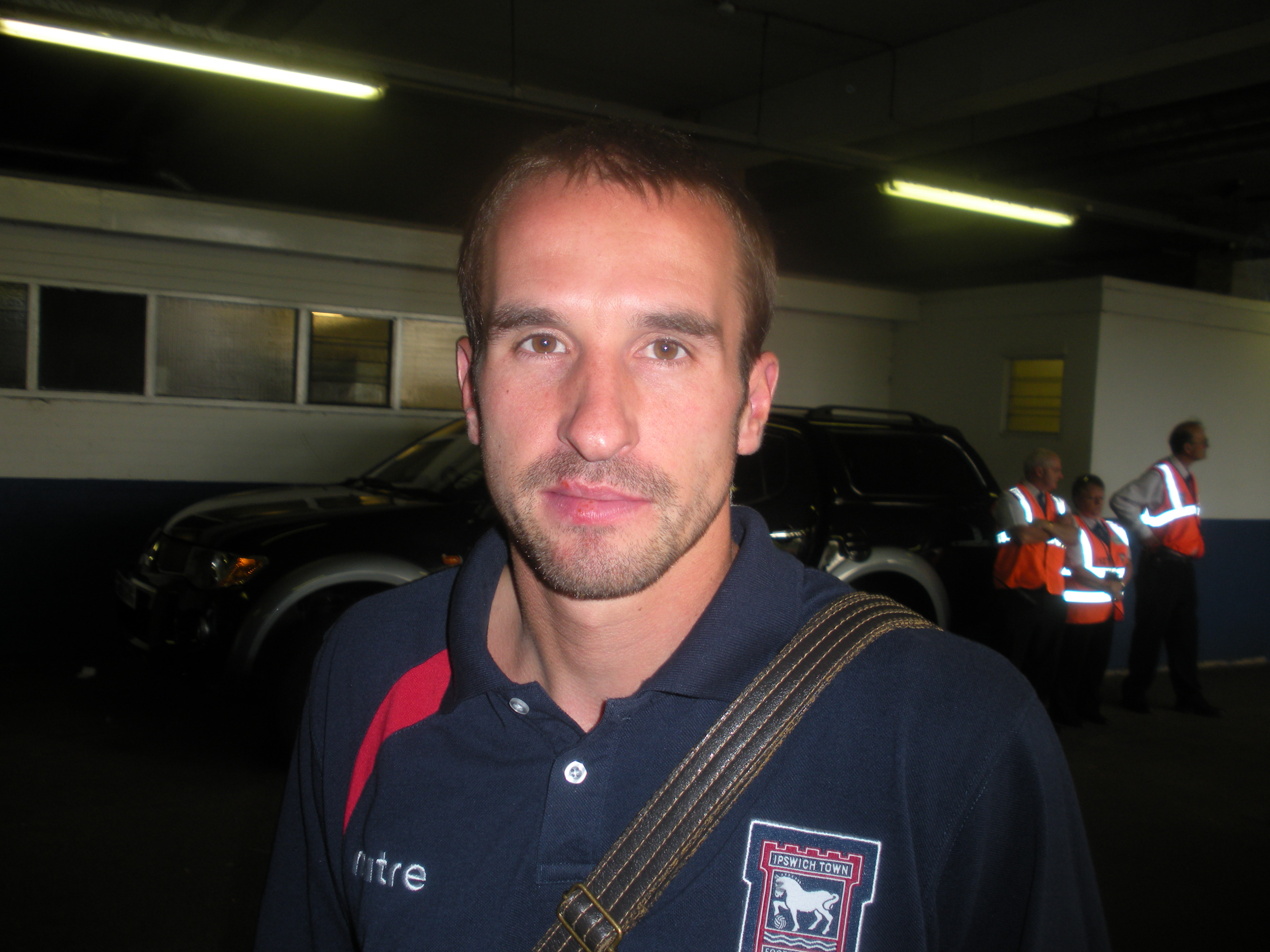
Assistant manager David Wright was placed in temporary charge of Colchester on 26 April following Keen's exit.

A late Crewe equaliser denied the U's the opportunity to close the gap on the teams above them in the table on 19 April. Having led 1–0 since the 65th-minute when George Moncur converted a penalty, Crewe scored through a Callum Saunders header in the first minute of second-half stoppage time. Their fate was finally sealed on 23 April when they were beaten 3–0 at home to promotion hopefuls Burton, spelling a return to the fourth tier of English football for the first time in 18-years. Kevin Keen dropped Alex Gilbey and George Moncur from the starting eleven, preferring Louis Dunne in midfield who made his first senior start. The match got off to a bad start for the U's when Joe Edwards was sent off for a challenge on Matt Palmer in only the 17th-minute, before falling behind to the first of three Lucas Akins goals on the stroke of half-time. It took him just four minutes after the restart to score his second, and the game was effectively over on the hour mark when he scored his third. Edwards' red card was later rescinded on 26 April.

Following Colchester's relegation, Keen left the club by mutual consent on 26 April. David Wright was placed in temporary charge for Colchester's final two games of the season. Meanwhile, the club confirmed contract extensions for Alex Wynter, who signed for a further two-years, and young goalkeeper James Bransgrove, who signed until 2019.

Wright's newly acquired side battled back from 2–1 down to secure a point against Barnsley on 30 April with an equaliser deep in added time. George Moncur's 14th goal of the season gave Colchester the lead in the 42nd minute and the side went into the break in a winning position. After the interval, Barnsley equalised through Ashley Fletcher on 57-minutes, and then Fletcher gave his side the lead with ten minutes remaining. Tom Lapslie scored his first league goal of the season in the eighth minute of stoppage time to earn the U's a draw.

==== May ====
Chairman Robbie Cowling was quick to announce Keen's successor. On 4 May, he revealed John McGreal would be taking up the role of manager with Steve Ball his assistant ahead of Colchester's final game of the season. With McGreal's role set to commence following Colchester's game with Rochdale on 8 May, Ball was named as the club's fifth caretaker manager of the season after David Wright was made unavailable for "personal reasons".

Ahead of the final game of the campaign, three development squad players signed new one-year deals with the club, with Charley Edge, Michael O'Donoghue and Chris Regis all agreeing new contracts.

Colchester ended the campaign in defeat against Rochdale on 8 May. Caretaker manager Steve Ball had named Dillon Barnes in the first-team as goalkeeper, which would have been his professional debut following Elliot Parish's injury the previous weekend. However, Barnes was caught up in traffic, and James Bransgrove stepped in to instead make his professional bow. The U's were behind after 18-minutes when Nathaniel Mendez-Laing scored. Joe Edwards levelled the scores eight-minutes after the interval but had to go off injured after 64-minutes. His replacement, Cameron James, became the second player of the day to make his professional debut. Five minutes later, Rochdale scored the winner from Calvin Andrew to end Colchester's miserable season in yet another defeat.

=== League Cup ===
Colchester hosted Championship opposition in the first round of the League Cup, with Reading coming to the Community Stadium for the first time. The match saw Sam Walker make his first appearance of the season, but was replaced by Elliot Parish just before the hour mark following an injury. The match went to extra time, with Reading nicking a late goal through Chris Gunter to send the U's out of the competition in the first round for the fifth successive season.

=== Football League Trophy ===
The Football League Trophy first round handed Colchester a trip to League Two Northampton Town on 1 September. Dominic Calvert-Lewin opened the scoring for the hosts after 9 minutes, but Macauley Bonne scored his second of the season to level the scores on 32 minutes. In the second half, Ryan Watson once again gave Northampton the lead, before Bonne struck again to score his first brace for Colchester in the 82nd minute. Three minutes later however, Northampton were back in front through Marc Richards. The score remained at 3–2 until full-time to ensure Colchester's second exit of the season from a cup competition at the first round stage.

=== FA Cup ===
Colchester were pitted away to National League South side Wealdstone in the first round draw of the FA Cup made on 26 October. The two sides have twice previously met in the competition, firstly in 1949 when the U's were defeated 1–0 away, and more recently in 1983 when they won 4–0 at Layer Road. Colchester's game on 7 November proved as fruitful as their previous encounter, recording a 6–2 victory at the Freebets.co.uk stadium. Macauley Bonne opened the scoring following a goalless first 26 minutes, but the U's were pegged back by their sixth tier opponents five minutes later when Jefferson Louis converted a penalty after Joe Edwards had fouled in the area. Colchester fell behind on 38 minutes when Bradley Hudson-Odoi scored from close range to make it 2–1 to the home side, but Bonne levelled the score with his second on 44 minutes, heading in Callum Harriott's cross. Bonne sealed his hat-trick two-minutes after half-time to reinstate Colchester's lead, before scoring his fourth goal on 68 minutes. George Moncur scored Colchester's fifth goal in the 82nd minute, before Marvin Sordell rounded off the match with a 90th-minute effort. Bonne was brought off in the final minute of stoppage time, making way for debutant midfielder Jack Curtis to experience his first brief taste of professional football. Bonne's goal haul was the first time a Colchester United player had scored a hat-trick since Jamie Cureton against Southend United on 6 April 2007, and equalled Colchester's record for the most goals in a competitive game by a single player. He joined the likes of Arthur Pritchard, Arthur Turner, Vic Keeble, Neil Langman, Bobby Hunt, Martyn King, Bobby Svarc, Roy McDonough, and Chris Iwelumo, the last of whom scored the most recent quadruple against Hull City at Layer Road on 28 November 2006.

In the second round draw on the 9 November, the U's were handed a home tie against National League side Altrincham. Caretaker manager Wayne Brown led his side to victory in his first match in charge thanks to a Callum Harriott goal in the fourth minute of stoppage time to beat the National League outfit 3–2. Altincham had opened the scoring after just three minutes at the Community Stadium through Jake Moult, whose lobbed 25-yard shot caught goalkeeper Jamie Jones off his line. The U's equalised after 14-minutes, when Harriott scored his third goal in as many games with an assist from Marvin Sordell. The score remained level through to half-time, but Colchester fell behind just 18-seconds after the restart when Michael Rankine beat George Elokobi and placed his shot past Jones. Colchester again had to come from behind to equalise in the 53rd minute as Tom Lapslie scored his first goal of the season following a chipped cross from Sordell. With the prospect of a replay trip to Altrincham looming, Harriott struck to score his second of the game and see the U's through to the third round for the second successive season.

The draw for the third round of the FA Cup, which took place on 7 December saw the U's handed a home tie against struggling Championship opposition in the shape of Charlton Athletic. Kevin Keen managed the side to their first win under his stewardship against their second tier opposition on 9 January 2016. George Moncur's tenth goal of the campaign handed the U's a 1–0 lead after 28-minutes, before assist-provider Marvin Sordell doubled Colchester's advantage four minutes before the interval, with Moncur returning the favour. Charlton rallied late on to grab a consolation goal in the second minute of added time, but Colchester held on to find themselves in the draw for the fourth round for the first time in ten years.

A home match against Premier League team Tottenham Hotspur was set after the club beat Leicester City 2–0 at King Power Stadium on 20 January 2016. The game is scheduled to be played between 29 January and 1 February. On 20 January, Tottenham beat Leicester 2–0 in their replay match at the King Power Stadium to set up a fourth round tie with the U's. It would be the first time the two sides would meet in a competitive fixture. A sickening clash of heads between Colchester defenders Tom Eastman and Alex Wynter in the opening two minutes of the game immediately put the home side on the back foot in the game on 30 January. Wynter was taken to hospital after suffering concussion and a seizure on the pitch and was replaced by Frankie Kent after several minutes of treatment on the field. After being bandaged up, Eastman continued to play, but was withdrawn and replaced by Matthew Briggs after 21-minutes of the match. After dominating much of the play, Spurs opened the scoring through Nacer Chadli's fine curling 20-yard effort midway through the first-half, and the score remained the same until the 64th-minute when Eric Dier scored with a deflected shot. Chadli scored his second of the match after 78-minutes, but just two minutes later, Colchester scored a consolation goal after Gavin Massey's driven shot was turned into his own net by Ben Davies. Another two-minutes passed before Tottenham scored their fourth goal to seal the game with Tom Carroll firing the ball home.

== Players ==
=== First-team squad ===
As of 9 May 2016.

Note: Flags indicate national team as defined under FIFA eligibility rules; some limited exceptions apply. Players may hold more than one non-FIFA nationality.

No.	Pos.	Nation	Player
1	GK	ENG	Sam Walker
2	MF	IRL	Owen Garvan (captain)
3	DF	GUY	Matthew Briggs
4	MF	ENG	Joe Edwards
5	DF	ENG	Alex Wynter
6	DF	CMR	George Elokobi
7	MF	ENG	Drey Wright
8	MF	ENG	Alex Gilbey (vice-captain)
9	FW	ENG	Chris Porter
10	MF	ENG	George Moncur
11	FW	ENG	Gavin Massey

No.	Pos.	Nation	Player
14	DF	ENG	Tosin Olufemi
15	DF	ENG	Frankie Kent
17	MF	ENG	Sammie Szmodics
18	DF	ENG	Tom Eastman
19	FW	ZIM	Macauley Bonne
22	DF	ENG	Kane Vincent-Young
24	DF	ENG	Richard Brindley
28	MF	ENG	Darren Ambrose
31	DF	ENG	Nicky Shorey
33	GK	ENG	Elliot Parish
45	FW	ENG	Marvin Sordell

=== Under-21s ===
Note: Flags indicate national team as defined under FIFA eligibility rules; some limited exceptions apply. Players may hold more than one non-FIFA nationality.

No.	Pos.	Nation	Player
16	FW	ENG	Femi Akinwande
20	MF	ENG	Tom Lapslie
21	MF	ENG	Dion Sembie-Ferris
23	DF	IRL	Michael O'Donoghue
25	GK	ENG	Dillon Barnes
26	DF	NIR	Jamie Harney
27	MF	ENG	Jack Curtis
29	GK	ENG	James Bransgrove
35	DF	ENG	Marley Andrews
36	MF	ENG	Callum Harrison
37	MF	ENG	Tyler Brampton

No.	Pos.	Nation	Player
38	MF	ENG	Kieran Bailey
39	FW	ESP	David Segura
40	DF	ENG	Cameron James
41	MF	IRL	Louis Dunne
—	GK		Danny Boness
—	DF		Joe Tennent
—	DF		JJ Wilson
—	MF	ENG	Chris Regis
—	FW		George Brown
—	FW	WAL	Charley Edge
—	FW		Tariq Issa

== Match details ==
=== Preseason friendlies ===
11 July 2015 Friendly	Heybridge Swifts	0–8	Colchester United	Heybridge
15:00 BST		Report	Porter 23', 35' (pen.); Lee 33'; Moncur 39'; Wright 58', 78'; Bonne 65'; Szmodics 77'	Stadium: Scraley Road; Attendance: 534; Referee: D. Cook

14 July 2015 Friendly	Brentwood Town	0–4	Colchester United	Brentwood
19:45 BST		Report	Massey 12', 20'; Szmodics 35'; Bonne 36'	Stadium: Brentwood Centre Arena; Attendance: 174

18 July 2015 Friendly	Bishop's Stortford	2–3	Colchester United	Bishop's Stortford
15:00 BST	Sellears 16'; Lee 69'	Report	Curtis 51'; Holman 54'; Bonne 65'	Stadium: ProKit UK Stadium; Attendance: 261; Referee: D. Rock

21 July 2015 Friendly	Colchester United	1–0	West Ham United	Colchester
19:45 BST	Moncur 13'	Report		Stadium: Colchester Community Stadium; Attendance: 6,650; Referee: T. Robinson

25 July 2015 Friendly	Colchester United	0–3	Leyton Orient	Colchester
15:00 BST		Report	McCallum 31', 47'; Kashket 76'	Stadium: Colchester Community Stadium; Attendance: 1,084; Referee: F. Graham

28 July 2015 Friendly	Colchester United	3–2	Ipswich Town	Colchester
19:45 BST	Gilbey 52', 85'; Massey 89'	Report	Bru 45'; McGoldrick 64' (pen.)	Stadium: Colchester Community Stadium; Attendance: 4,647; Referee: T. Robinson

1 August 2015 Friendly	Colchester United	0–1	Fulham XI	Colchester
15:00 BST		Report	Dembélé 30'	Stadium: Colchester Community Stadium; Attendance: 642; Referee: M. Bull

=== League One ===
==== Results round by round ====
Round	1	2	3	4	5	6	7	8	9	10	11	12	13	14	15	16	17	18	19	20	21	22	23	24	25	26	27	28	29	30	31	32	33	34	35	36	37	38	39	40	41	42	43	44	45	46
Ground	H	A	H	A	H	A	A	H	A	H	H	A	A	H	H	A	H	A	H	A	H	A	H	A	A	H	H	A	A	H	H	A	H	A	A	H	A	H	A	H	A	H	A	H	A	H
Result	D	L	D	L	D	D	W	W	W	W	L	L	L	W	D	L	L	L	L	L	L	L	L	L	D	L	D	L	L	L	D	L	D	W	L	D	L	W	W	D	W	L	D	L	D	L
Position	9	17	18	23	20	22	19	12	10	8	10	12	16	12	15	16	17	17	19	20	22	24	24	24	23	23	22	22	24	24	24	24	24	24	24	24	24	23	23	23	23	23	23	23	23	23

Updated to match(es) played on 9 May 2016. Source: cu-fc.com
A = Away; H = Home; W = Win; D = Draw; L = Loss

==== League table ====
Pos	Team	Pld	W	D	L	GF	GA	GD	Pts	Promotion, qualification or relegation
20	Shrewsbury Town	46	13	11	22	58	79	−21	50	
21	Doncaster Rovers (R)	46	11	13	22	48	64	−16	46	Relegation to EFL League Two
22	Blackpool (R)	46	12	10	24	40	63	−23	46	Relegation to EFL League Two
23	Colchester United (R)	46	9	13	24	57	99	−42	40	Relegation to EFL League Two
24	Crewe Alexandra (R)	46	7	13	26	46	83	−37	34	Relegation to EFL League Two

Updated to match(es) played on 1 July 2016. Source: BBC Sport
Rules for classification: 1) Points; 2) Goal difference; 3) Number of goals scored
(R) Relegated

==== Matches ====
The fixtures for the 2015–16 season were announced on 17 June 2014 at 9am.

8 August 2015 1	Colchester United	2–2	Blackpool	Colchester
15:00 BST	Gilbey 22'; Ambrose 56'	Report	Cullen 18', 45'	Stadium: Colchester Community Stadium; Attendance: 4,438; Referee: James Linington

15 August 2015 2	Peterborough United	2–1	Colchester United	Peterborough
15:00 BST	Maddison 31', 34'	Report	Bonne 30'	Stadium: London Road Stadium; Attendance: 5,339; Referee: Mark Haywood

18 August 2015 3	Colchester United	0–0	Oldham Athletic	Colchester
19:45 BST		Report		Stadium: Colchester Community Stadium; Attendance: 2,917; Referee: Keith Hill

22 August 2015 4	Fleetwood Town	4–0	Colchester United	Fleetwood
15:00 BST	Ryan 24'; Ball 26'; Proctor 49'; Matt 86'	Report		Stadium: Highbury Stadium; Attendance: 2,888; Referee: Chris Kavanagh

29 August 2015 5	Colchester United	2–2	Scunthorpe United	Colchester
15:00 BST	Moncur 33'; Elokobi 81'	Report	van Veen 7'; Madden 18'	Stadium: Colchester Community Stadium; Attendance: 3,019; Referee: Dean Whitestone

12 September 2015 6	Chesterfield	3–3	Colchester United	Chesterfield
15:00 BST	Jones 22'; Novak 62'; Morsy 74'; Talbot (red card) 16'	Report	Massey 29'; Moncur 76'; Raglan 90+2' (o.g.)	Stadium: Proact Stadium; Attendance: 5,227; Referee: Iain Williamson

15 September 2015 7	Sheffield United	2–3	Colchester United	Sheffield
19:45 BST	Sharp 51' (pen.); Woolford 61'	Report	Moncur 6', 23'; Sordell 82'; Elokobi (yellow card) 10' (red card) 86'	Stadium: Brammall Lane; Attendance: 17,623; Referee: Darren Handley

19 September 2015 8	Colchester United	2–1	Gillingham	Colchester
15:00 BST	Massey 4'; Harriott 29'	Report	Norris 7'	Stadium: Colchester Community Stadium; Attendance: 4,694; Referee: Charles Breakspear

26 September 2015 9	Swindon Town	1–2	Colchester United	Swindon
15:00 BST	Thomas 22'	Report	Moncur 3'; Harriott 42'	Stadium: County Ground; Attendance: 6,687; Referee: Oliver Langford

29 September 2015 10	Colchester United	2–0	Bradford City	Colchester
19:45 BST	Harriott 7'; Sordell 32'	Report		Stadium: Colchester Community Stadium; Attendance: 3,334; Referee: Keith Stroud

3 October 2015 11	Colchester United	0–1	Bury	Colchester
15:00 BST		Report	Clarke 75'	Stadium: Colchester Community Stadium; Attendance: 4,032; Referee: Simon Hooper

10 October 2015 12	Shrewsbury Town	4–2	Colchester United	Shrewsbury
15:00 BST	Barnett 46', 59'; Kaikai 72', 81'	Report	Ellis 36' (o.g.); Eastman 39'	Stadium: New Meadow; Attendance: 4,947; Referee: Lee Swabey

17 October 2015 13	Wigan Athletic	5–0	Colchester United	Wigan
15:00 BST	Daniels 5', 14'; Power 11'; Grigg 33', 87'	Report		Stadium: DW Stadium; Attendance: 8,048; Referee: Steve Martin

20 October 2015 14	Colchester United	2–1	Port Vale	Colchester
19:45 BST	Elokobi 25'; Sordell 73'	Report	Daniel 45'	Stadium: Colchester Community Stadium; Attendance: 2,785; Referee: Darren Deadman

24 October 2015 15	Colchester United	4–4	Walsall	Colchester
15:00 BST	Moncur 49'; Sordell 52'; Garvan 60'; Ambrose 80'	Report	Sawyers 11'; Lalkovič 30'; Evans 57'; O'Connor 90+1'	Stadium: Colchester Community Stadium; Attendance: 3,630; Referee: Seb Stockbridge

31 October 2015 16	Doncaster Rovers	2–0	Colchester United	Doncaster
15:00 GMT	Grant 41'; Williams 64'	Report		Stadium: Keepmoat Stadium; Attendance: 5,324; Referee: Graham Salisbury

14 November 2015 17	Colchester United	1–3	Coventry City	Colchester
15:00 GMT	Bonne 17'	Report	Murphy 32', 40'; Fortuné 49'	Stadium: Colchester Community Stadium; Attendance: 5,275; Referee: Graham Horwood

21 November 2015 18	Millwall	4–1	Colchester United	Bermondsey
15:00 GMT	Gregory 13'; Ferguson 38', 62'; Webster 81'	Report	Porter 55'	Stadium: The Den; Attendance: 8,739; Referee: Tim Robinson

24 November 2015 19	Colchester United	2–3	Crewe Alexandra	Colchester
19:45 GMT	Harriott 40'; Moncur 48'	Report	Colclough 61'; Haber 80'; Lowe 90+3'	Stadium: Colchester Community Stadium; Attendance: 2,602; Referee: Chris Sarginson

28 November 2015 20	Burton Albion	5–1	Colchester United	Burton upon Trent
15:00 GMT	El Khayati 25'; Duffy 34'; Naylor 51'; Akins 72'; Thiele 81'	Report	Harriott 4'	Stadium: Pirelli Stadium; Attendance: 2,893; Referee: Ben Toner

12 December 2015 21	Colchester United	2–3	Barnsley	Colchester
15:00 GMT	Moncur 67'; Porter 70'	Report	Hourihane 18'; Hammill 40'; Toney 60'	Stadium: Colchester Community Stadium; Attendance: 3,265; Referee: Steve Martin

19 December 2015 22	Rochdale	3–1	Colchester United	Rochdale
15:00 GMT	Henderson 30' (pen.); McDermott 34'; Lancashire 64'	Report	Porter 21'	Stadium: Spotland Stadium; Attendance: 2,205; Referee: Trevor Kettle

26 December 2015 23	Colchester United	0–2	Southend United	Colchester
15:00 GMT		Report	White 49'; Mooney 73'	Stadium: Colchester Community Stadium; Attendance: 9,222; Referee: Phil Gibbs

28 December 2015 24	Gillingham	1–0	Colchester United	Gillingham
15:00 GMT	Samuel 70'	Report		Stadium: Priestfield Stadium; Attendance: 7,109; Referee: Iain Williamson

2 January 2016 25	Oldham Athletic	1–1	Colchester United	Oldham
15:00 GMT	Murphy 5'	Report	Porter 81'	Stadium: Boundary Park; Attendance: 3,535; Referee: Mark Brown

16 January 2016 26	Colchester United	1–2	Sheffield United	Colchester
15:00 GMT	Eastman 59'	Report	Sharp 20'; Basham 90+1'	Stadium: Colchester Community Stadium; Attendance: 4,322; Referee: Brendan Malone

19 January 2016 27	Colchester United	1–1	Fleetwood Town	Colchester
19:45 GMT	Gilbey 38'	Report	Jónsson 60'	Stadium: Colchester Community Stadium; Attendance: 2,493; Referee: Stuart Attwell

23 January 2016 28	Scunthorpe United	3–0	Colchester United	Scunthorpe
15:00 GMT	Hopper 60'; Madden 62', 68'	Report		Stadium: Glanford Park; Attendance: 3,332; Referee: Darren Handley

8 February 2016 29	Southend United	3–0	Colchester United	Southend-on-Sea
15:00 GMT	Wordsworth 82'; Barrett 88'; McQueen 90+3'	Report	Gilbey (red card) 36'	Stadium: Roots Hall; Attendance: 10,279; Referee: Oliver Langford

13 February 2016 30	Colchester United	1–4	Swindon Town	Colchester
15:00 GMT	Edwards 64'	Report	Ajose 36', 56'; Doughty 58', 72'	Stadium: Colchester Community Stadium; Attendance: 3,269; Referee: Steve Martin

16 February 2016 31	Colchester United	1–1	Chesterfield	Colchester
19:45 GMT	Bonne 69'	Report	Novak 72' (pen.); Liddle (red card) 18'	Stadium: Colchester Community Stadium; Attendance: 6,167; Referee: Lee Swabey

20 February 2016 32	Bury	5–2	Colchester United	Bury
15:00 GMT	Lowe 34'; Tutte 51', 51', 62'; Jones 56'	Report	Porter 4'; Massey 17'; Eastman (yellow card) 14' (yellow-red card) 33'	Stadium: Gigg Lane; Attendance: 3,428; Referee: Mark Brown

27 February 2016 33	Colchester United	0–0	Shrewsbury Town	Colchester
15:00 GMT		Report		Stadium: Colchester Community Stadium; Attendance: 3,057; Referee: Andy Woolmer

1 March 2016 34	Bradford City	1–2	Colchester United	Bradford
19:45 GMT	Thomas 17'	Report	Ambrose 23', 57'	Stadium: Valley Parade; Attendance: 16,786; Referee: Graham Salisbury

5 March 2016 35	Port Vale	2–0	Colchester United	Burslem
15:00 GMT	Robinson 9'; Foley 73'	Report		Stadium: Vale Park; Attendance: 4,116; Referee: Jeremy Simpson

12 March 2016 36	Colchester United	3–3	Wigan Athletic	Colchester
15:00 GMT	Gilbey 40'; Lee 50'; Moncur 60' (pen.)	Report	Wildschut 36'; Colclough 44'; Grigg 90'	Stadium: Colchester Community Stadium; Attendance: 3,761; Referee: Kevin Johnson

19 March 2016 37	Walsall	2–1	Colchester United	Walsall
15:00 GMT	Bradshaw 89'; Preston 90+4'	Report	Gilbey 45+1'	Stadium: Bescot Stadium; Attendance: 5,818; Referee: Andy Haines

25 March 2016 38	Colchester United	4–1	Doncaster Rovers	Colchester
15:00 GMT	Porter 62'; Lee 71'; Gilbey 72'; Brindley 87'	Report	McSheffrey 21'	Stadium: Colchester Community Stadium; Attendance: 3,771; Referee: Kevin Friend

29 March 2016 39	Coventry City	0–1	Colchester United	Coventry
19:45 BST		Report	Massey 18'	Stadium: Ricoh Arena; Attendance: 10,027; Referee: Tim Robinson

2 April 2016 40	Colchester United	0–0	Millwall	Colchester
15:00 BST		Report		Stadium: Colchester Community Stadium; Attendance: 5,377; Referee: Kevin Johnson

9 April 2016 41	Blackpool	0–1	Colchester United	Blackpool
15:00 BST		Report	Porter 60'	Stadium: Bloomfield Road; Attendance: 6,242; Referee: Chris Sarginson

16 April 2016 42	Colchester United	1–4	Peterborough United	Colchester
15:00 BST	Moncur 76'	Report	Taylor 2'; Fox 67'; Coulthirst 69'; Maddison 90+4'	Stadium: Colchester Community Stadium; Attendance: 5,965; Referee: Andy Madley

19 April 2016 43	Crewe Alexandra	1–1	Colchester United	Crewe
19:45 BST	Saunders 90+1'	Report	Moncur 65' (pen.)	Stadium: Gresty Road; Attendance: 3,094; Referee: Scott Duncan

23 April 2016 44	Colchester United	0–3	Burton Albion	Colchester
15:00 BST	Edwards (red card) 17'	Report	Akins 45', 49', 60'	Stadium: Colchester Community Stadium; Attendance: 4,292; Referee: Mark Heywood

30 April 2016 45	Barnsley	2–2	Colchester United	Barnsley
15:00 BST	Fletcher 57', 80'	Report	Moncur 42'; Lapslie 90+8'	Stadium: Oakwell; Attendance: 12,021; Referee: Nigel Miller

8 May 2016 46	Colchester United	1–2	Rochdale	Colchester
12:30 BST	Edwards 53'	Report	Mendez-Laing 18'; Andrew 69'	Stadium: Colchester Community Stadium; Attendance: 3,435; Referee: Andy Davies

=== League Cup ===
The League Cup first round draw was made on 16 June 2015. Colchester United were drawn at home against Championship side Reading.

11 August 2015 First round	Colchester United	0–1 (a.e.t.)	Reading	Colchester
19:45 BST		Report	Gunter 115'	Stadium: Colchester Community Stadium; Attendance: 2,706; Referee: Darren Drysdale

=== FA Cup ===
The FA Cup first round draw was made on 26 October 2015, with Colchester being drawn away to National League South side Wealdstone. The second round draw, made on 9 November, saw the U's handed a home tie against Altrincham of the National League. In the third round draw made on 7 December, Colchester were drawn at home to Championship side Charlton Athletic. After beating Charlton, Colchester were given a home tie against Premier League opposition in the fourth round draw on 11 January 2016, with either Leicester City or Tottenham Hotspur visiting the Community Stadium.

7 November 2015 First round	Wealdstone	2–6	Colchester United	Ruislip
15:00 GMT	Louis 31' (pen.); Hudson-Odoi 38'	Report	Bonne 26', 44', 47', 68'; Moncur 82'; Sordell 90'	Stadium: Grosvenor Vale; Attendance: 2,440; Referee: Brendan Malone

6 December 2015 Second round	Colchester United	3–2	Altrincham	Colchester
14:00 GMT	Harriott 14', 90+4'; Lapslie 53'	Report	Moult 3'; Rankine 46'	Stadium: Colchester Community Stadium; Attendance: 2,592; Referee: Andy Davies

9 January 2016 Third round	Colchester United	2–1	Charlton Athletic	Colchester
15:00 GMT	Moncur 28'; Sordell 41'	Report	Ghoochannejhad 90+2'	Stadium: Colchester Community Stadium; Attendance: 5,742; Referee: Chris Kavanagh

30 January 2016 Fourth round	Colchester United	1–4	Tottenham Hotspur	Colchester
12:45 GMT	Davies 80' (o.g.)	Report	Chadli 27', 78'; Dier 64'; Carroll 82'	Stadium: Colchester Community Stadium; Attendance: 9,920; Referee: Michael Oliver

=== Football League Trophy ===
On 8 August 2015, live on Soccer AM the draw for the first round of the Football League Trophy was drawn by Toni Duggan and Alex Scott. The U's would travel to Northampton Town on 1/2 September.

1 September 2015 First round	Northampton Town	3–2	Colchester United	Northampton
19:45 BST	Calvert-Lewin 9'; Watson 49'; Richards 85'	Report	Bonne 32', 82'	Stadium: Sixfields Stadium; Attendance: 1,366; Referee: Darren Deadman

== Squad statistics ==
=== Appearances and goals ===
As of 9 May 2016

No.	Pos	Nat	Player	Total		League One		FA Cup		League Cup		FL Trophy	
No.	Pos	Nat	Player	Apps	Goals	Apps	Goals	Apps	Goals	Apps	Goals	Apps	Goals
1	GK	(England) ENG	Sam Walker	1	0	0	0	0	0	1	0	0	0
2	MF	(Republic of Ireland) IRL	Owen Garvan	35	1	28+4	1	2	0	0	0	1	0
3	DF	(Guyana) GUY	Matthew Briggs	32	0	25+1	0	3+1	0	1	0	1	0
4	MF	(England) ENG	Joe Edwards	45	2	40+2	2	1+1	0	1	0	0	0
5	DF	(England) ENG	Alex Wynter	16	0	9+3	0	2	0	1	0	1	0
6	DF	(Cameroon) CMR	George Elokobi	19	2	15+2	2	1	0	0	0	1	0
7	MF	(England) ENG	Drey Wright	13	0	1+10	0	0	0	0+1	0	0+1	0
8	MF	(England) ENG	Alex Gilbey	42	5	31+6	5	4	0	1	0	0	0
9	FW	(England) ENG	Chris Porter	35	7	26+6	7	2+1	0	0	0	0	0
10	MF	(England) ENG	George Moncur	51	14	40+5	12	4	2	1	0	1	0
11	FW	(England) ENG	Gavin Massey	47	4	37+5	4	3+1	0	1	0	0	0
14	DF	(England) ENG	Tosin Olufemi	11	0	10	0	0+1	0	0	0	0	0
15	DF	(England) ENG	Frankie Kent	29	0	23+3	0	1+1	0	0	0	1	0
16	FW	(England) ENG	Femi Akinwande	2	0	1+1	0	0	0	0	0	0	0
17	MF	(England) ENG	Sammie Szmodics	8	0	1+4	0	0+1	0	0+1	0	1	0
18	DF	(England) ENG	Tom Eastman	48	2	43	2	4	0	1	0	0	0
19	FW	(Zimbabwe) ZIM	Macauley Bonne	37	9	13+20	3	1+1	4	1	0	1	2
20	MF	(England) ENG	Tom Lapslie	12	2	7+3	1	2	1	0	0	0	0
21	FW	(England) ENG	Dion Sembie-Ferris	10	0	1+7	0	0	0	1	0	1	0
22	DF	(England) ENG	Kane Vincent-Young	16	0	10+4	0	1+1	0	0	0	0	0
24	DF	(England) ENG	Richard Brindley	25	1	17+4	1	3	0	1	0	0	0
26	DF	(Northern Ireland) NIR	Jamie Harney	4	0	1+3	0	0	0	0	0	0	0
27	MF	(England) ENG	Jack Curtis	1	0	0	0	0+1	0	0	0	0	0
28	MF	(England) ENG	Darren Ambrose	26	4	13+12	4	1	0	0	0	0	0
29	GK	(England) ENG	James Bransgrove	1	0	1	0	0	0	0	0	0	0
31	DF	(England) ENG	Nicky Shorey	15	0	13+2	0	0	0	0	0	0	0
33	GK	(England) ENG	Elliot Parish	28	0	25	0	1	0	0+1	0	1	0
40	DF	(England) ENG	Cameron James	1	0	0+1	0	0	0	0	0	0	0
41	MF	(Republic of Ireland) IRL	Louis Dunne	2	0	1+1	0	0	0	0	0	0	0
45	FW	(England) ENG	Marvin Sordell	25	6	19+2	4	3+1	2	0	0	0	0
Players who appeared for Colchester who left during the season
12	GK	(England) ENG	Jamie Jones	18	0	17	0	1	0	0	0	0	0
12	FW	(England) ENG	Elliot Lee	15	2	11+4	2	0	0	0	0	0	0
30	FW	(England) ENG	Nathan Oduwa	2	0	0+2	0	0	0	0	0	0	0
31	FW	(England) ENG	Callum Harriott	23	7	19+1	5	2	2	0	0	1	0
32	DF	(England) ENG	Leo Chambers	6	0	5+1	0	0	0	0	0	0	0
32	GK	(England) ENG	Jake Kean	5	0	3	0	2	0	0	0	0	0

=== Goalscorers ===
Place	Number	Nation	Position	Name	League One	FA Cup	League Cup	FL Trophy	Total
1	10	(England)	MF	George Moncur	12	2	0	0	14
2	19	(Zimbabwe)	FW	Macauley Bonne	3	4	0	2	9
3	31	(England)	FW	Callum Harriott	5	2	0	0	7
3	9	(England)	FW	Chris Porter	7	0	0	0	7
5	45	(England)	FW	Marvin Sordell	4	2	0	0	6
6	8	(England)	MF	Alex Gilbey	5	0	0	0	5
7	28	(England)	MF	Darren Ambrose	4	0	0	0	4
7	11	(England)	FW	Gavin Massey	4	0	0	0	4
9	18	(England)	DF	Tom Eastman	2	0	0	0	2
9	4	(England)	MF	Joe Edwards	2	0	0	0	2
9	6	(Cameroon)	DF	George Elokobi	2	0	0	0	2
9	20	(England)	MF	Tom Lapslie	1	1	0	0	2
9	12	(England)	FW	Elliot Lee	2	0	0	0	2
14	24	(England)	DF	Richard Brindley	1	0	0	0	1
14	2	(Republic of Ireland)	MF	Owen Garvan	1	0	0	0	1
				Own goals	2	1	0	0	3
				TOTALS	54	12	0	2	68

=== Disciplinary record ===
Number	Nationality	Position	Player	League One		FA Cup		League Cup		FL Trophy		Total	
Number	Nationality	Position	Player	Yellow card	Red card	Yellow card	Red card	Yellow card	Red card	Yellow card	Red card	Yellow card	Red card
4	(England)	MF	Joe Edwards	9	1	0	0	0	0	0	0	9	1
8	(England)	MF	Alex Gilbey	7	1	2	0	0	0	0	0	9	1
3	(Guyana)	DF	Matthew Briggs	5	0	0	0	1	0	1	0	7	0
2	(Republic of Ireland)	MF	Owen Garvan	5	0	1	0	0	0	0	0	6	0
18	(England)	DF	Tom Eastman	2	1	0	0	0	0	0	0	2	1
31	(England)	FW	Callum Harriott	4	0	1	0	0	0	0	0	5	0
6	(Cameroon)	DF	George Elokobi	1	1	0	0	0	0	0	0	1	1
15	(England)	DF	Frankie Kent	3	0	1	0	0	0	0	0	4	0
11	(England)	FW	Gavin Massey	4	0	0	0	0	0	0	0	4	0
20	(England)	MF	Tom Lapslie	3	0	0	0	0	0	0	0	3	0
28	(England)	MF	Darren Ambrose	2	0	0	0	0	0	0	0	2	0
19	(Zimbabwe)	FW	Macauley Bonne	2	0	0	0	0	0	0	0	2	0
22	(England)	DF	Kane Vincent-Young	2	0	0	0	0	0	0	0	2	0
24	(England)	DF	Richard Brindley	1	0	0	0	0	0	0	0	1	0
32	(England)	DF	Leo Chambers	1	0	0	0	0	0	0	0	1	0
12	(England)	FW	Elliot Lee	1	0	0	0	0	0	0	0	1	0
10	(England)	MF	George Moncur	1	0	0	0	0	0	0	0	1	0
31	(England)	DF	Nicky Shorey	1	0	0	0	0	0	0	0	1	0
45	(England)	FW	Marvin Sordell	1	0	0	0	0	0	0	0	1	0
7	(England)	FW	Drey Wright	1	0	0	0	0	0	0	0	1	0
5	(England)	DF	Alex Wynter	0	0	0	0	0	0	1	0	1	0
			TOTALS	53	4	3	0	1	0	2	0	59	4

=== Player debuts ===
Players making their first-team Colchester United debut in a fully competitive match.

Number	Position	Player	Date	Opponent	Ground	Notes
33	GK	(England) Elliot Parish	8 August 2015	Blackpool	Colchester Community Stadium	
3	DF	(Guyana) Matthew Briggs	8 August 2015	Blackpool	Colchester Community Stadium	(Note: Second debut for the club.)
24	DF	(England) Richard Brindley	8 August 2015	Blackpool	Colchester Community Stadium	
22	DF	(England) Kane Vincent-Young	8 August 2015	Blackpool	Colchester Community Stadium	
28	MF	(England) Darren Ambrose	8 August 2015	Blackpool	Colchester Community Stadium	
4	MF	(England) Joe Edwards	8 August 2015	Blackpool	Colchester Community Stadium	
6	DF	(Cameroon) George Elokobi	22 August 2015	Fleetwood Town	Highbury Stadium	
31	FW	(England) Callum Harriott	29 August 2015	Scunthorpe United	Colchester Community Stadium	
2	MF	(Republic of Ireland) Owen Garvan	29 August 2015	Scunthorpe United	Colchester Community Stadium	
12	GK	(England) Jamie Jones	12 September 2015	Chesterfield	Proact Stadium	
45	FW	(England) Marvin Sordell	12 September 2015	Chesterfield	Proact Stadium	
27	MF	(England) Jack Curtis	7 November 2015	Wealdstone	Freebets.co.uk Stadium	
32	GK	(England) Jake Kean	9 January 2016	Charlton Athletic	Colchester Community Stadium	
12	FW	(England) Elliot Lee	19 January 2016	Fleetwood Town	Colchester Community Stadium	
31	DF	(England) Nicky Shorey	13 February 2016	Swindon Town	Colchester Community Stadium	
26	DF	(Northern Ireland) Jamie Harney	20 February 2016	Bury	Gigg Lane	
32	DF	(England) Leo Chambers	27 February 2016	Shrewsbury Town	Colchester Community Stadium	
30	FW	(England) Nathan Oduwa	27 February 2016	Shrewsbury Town	Colchester Community Stadium	
41	MF	(Republic of Ireland) Louis Dunne	12 March 2016	Wigan Athletic	Colchester Community Stadium	
16	FW	(England) Femi Akinwande	12 March 2016	Wigan Athletic	Colchester Community Stadium	
29	GK	(England) James Bransgrove	8 May 2016	Rochdale	Colchester Community Stadium	
40	DF	(England) Cameron James	8 May 2016	Rochdale	Colchester Community Stadium	

== Transfers and contracts ==
=== In ===
Date	Pos	Player	From	Fee	Ref
2 June 2015	DF	(England) Richard Brindley	(England) Rotherham United	Free transfer	
10 June 2015	MF	(England) Kieran Bailey	(England) West Ham United	Free transfer	
22 June 2015	DF	(Guyana) Matthew Briggs	(England) Millwall	Free transfer	
3 July 2015	DF	(Cameroon) George Elokobi	(England) Oldham Athletic	Free transfer	
6 July 2015	MF	(England) Joe Edwards	(England) Yeovil Town	Free transfer	
23 July 2015	GK	(England) Elliot Parish	(England) Blackpool	Free transfer	
6 August 2015	MF	(England) Darren Ambrose	(England) Ipswich Town	Free transfer	
7 August 2015	FW	(Wales) Charley Edge	(England) Everton	Free transfer	
7 August 2015	MF	(England) Chris Regis	(England) Southampton	Free transfer	
27 August 2015	MF	(Republic of Ireland) Owen Garvan	(England) Crystal Palace	Free transfer	
1 September 2015	GK	(England) Dillon Barnes	(England) Bedford Town	Free transfer	
10 September 2015	FW	(England) Marvin Sordell	(England) Burnley	Free transfer	
23 November 2015	FW	(England) Femi Akinwande	(England) Maldon & Tiptree	Free transfer	
20 January 2016	DF	(England) Nicky Shorey	(India) Pune City	Free transfer	

=== Out ===
Date	Pos	Player	To	Fee	Ref
5 May 2015	DF	(England) Sean Clohessy	(England) Leyton Orient	Released	(Note: Following Sean Clohessy's release by Colchester United, he later joined Leyton Orient.)
5 May 2015	FW	(England) Dominic Smith	(England) Newcastle Town	Released	(Note: Following Dominic Smith's release by Colchester United, he later joined Newcastle Town.)
15 May 2015	DF	(England) Magnus Okuonghae	(England) Luton Town	Released	(Note: Following Magnus Okuonghae's release by Colchester United, he later joined Luton Town.)
18 May 2015	FW	(England) Jabo Ibehre	(England) Carlisle United	Released	(Note: Following Jabo Ibehre's release by Colchester United, he later joined Carlisle United.)
18 May 2015	DF	(England) Kevin Lokko	(England) Welling United	Released	(Note: Following Kevin Lokko's release by Colchester United, he later joined Welling United.)
18 May 2015	FW	(England) Sanchez Watt	(India) Kerala Blasters	Released	(Note: Following Sanchez Watt's release by Colchester United, he later joined Kerala Blasters.)
24 June 2015	MF	(England) David Fox	(England) Crewe Alexandra	Free transfer	(Note: Following David Fox's Colchester United exit, he later joined Crewe Alexandra.)
1 July 2015	DF	(England) Ben Gordon	(England) Chester	Released	(Note: Following Ben Gordon's release by Colchester United, he later joined Chester.)
3 September 2015	GK	(England) Chris Lewington	(England) Margate	Released	(Note: Following Chris Lewington's release by Colchester United, he later joined Margate.)
5 January 2016	FW	(England) Dan Holman	(England) Cheltenham Town	Free transfer	
18 January 2016	MF	(England) Byron Lawrence	(England) Bishop's Stortford	Released	(Note: Following Byron Lawrence's release by Colchester United, he later joined Bishop's Stortford.)

=== Loans in ===
Date	Pos	Player	From	End date	Ref
28 August 2015	MF	(England) Callum Harriott	(England) Charlton Athletic	1 January 2016	
11 September 2015	GK	(England) Jamie Jones	(England) Preston North End	19 December 2015	
7 January 2016	GK	(England) Jake Kean	(England) Norwich City	4 February 2016	
18 January 2016	FW	(England) Elliot Lee	(England) West Ham United	30 June 2016	
26 February 2016	DF	(England) Leo Chambers	(England) West Ham United	30 June 2016 (Note: On 29 March 2016, Leo Chambers' loan was extended until the end of the season.)	
26 February 2016	FW	(England) Nathan Oduwa	(England) Tottenham Hotspur	26 March 2016	

=== Loans out ===
Date	Pos	Player	To	End date	Ref
7 August 2015	DF	(England) Tyler Brampton	(England) Maldon & Tiptree	6 January 2016 (Note: On 13 November 2015, Tyler Brampton's loan was extended until 7 December 2015.) (Note: On 8 December 2015, Tyler Brampton's loan was further extended until 6 January 2016.)	
7 August 2015	FW	(Spain) David Segura	(England) Maldon & Tiptree	7 January 2016	
15 August 2015	FW	(England) Dan Holman	(England) Woking	2 January 2016 (Note: On 1 September 2015, Dan Holman's loan was extended until 2 January 2016.)	
9 October 2015	MF	(England) Callum Harrison	(England) Needham Market	7 January 2016 (Note: On 13 November 2015, Callum Harrison's loan was extended until 7 December 2015.) (Note: On 8 December 2015, Callum Harrison's loan was further extended until 7 January 2016.)	
30 October 2015	MF	(England) Sammie Szmodics	(England) Braintree Town	27 November 2015	
20 November 2015	FW	(Wales) Charley Edge	(England) Maldon & Tiptree	21 January 2016	
8 January 2016	DF	(England) Marley Andrews	(England) Maldon & Tiptree	5 February 2016	
22 January 2016	GK	(England) James Bransgrove	(England) Maldon & Tiptree	19 February 2016	
23 February 2016	MF	(England) Chris Regis	(England) Maldon & Tiptree	22 March 2016	
4 March 2016	GK	(England) James Bransgrove	(England) Wealdstone	31 March 2016	
23 March 2016	DF	(England) Tyler Brampton	(England) Grays Athletic	30 June 2016	
23 March 2016	DF	Joe Tennent	(England) Grays Athletic	30 June 2016	
24 March 2016	FW	(England) Dion Sembie-Ferris	(England) Margate	30 June 2016	
31 March 2016	GK	Danny Boness	(England) Grays Athletic		

=== Contracts ===
New contracts and contract extensions.

Date	Pos	Player	Length	Contracted until	Ref
8 May 2015	MF	(England) Jack Curtis	1 year	May 2016	
8 May 2015	MF	(England) Byron Lawrence	1 year	May 2016	
8 May 2015	DF	(Republic of Ireland) Michael O'Donoghue	1 year	May 2016	
15 May 2015	FW	(England) Dion Sembie-Ferris	3 years	May 2018	
2 June 2015	DF	(England) Richard Brindley	2 years	May 2017	
10 June 2015	MF	(England) Kieran Bailey	2 years	May 2017	
22 June 2015	DF	(Guyana) Matthew Briggs	2 years	May 2017	
3 July 2015	DF	(Cameroon) George Elokobi	2 years	May 2017	
6 July 2015	MF	(England) Joe Edwards	1 year	May 2016	
15 July 2015	DF	(England) Cameron James	4 years	May 2019	
15 July 2015	FW	(England) Tariq Issa	4 years	May 2019	
23 July 2015	GK	(England) Elliot Parish	1 year	May 2016	
6 August 2015	MF	(England) Darren Ambrose	1 year	May 2016	
7 August 2015	FW	(Wales) Charley Edge	1 year	May 2016	
7 August 2015	MF	(England) Chris Regis	1 year	May 2016	
14 August 2015	DF	(England) Kane Vincent-Young	2 years	May 2017	
27 August 2015	MF	(Republic of Ireland) Owen Garvan	5 months	January 2016	
1 September 2015	GK	(England) Dillon Barnes	1 year	May 2016	
10 September 2015	FW	(England) Marvin Sordell	1 year	May 2016	
25 September 2015	MF	(Republic of Ireland) Owen Garvan	1 1/2 years	May 2017	
23 November 2015	FW	(England) Femi Akinwande	1 year	May 2016	
22 December 2015	GK	(England) Sam Walker	2 1/2 years	May 2018	
14 January 2016	MF	(Republic of Ireland) Louis Dunne	3 years	May 2019	
20 January 2016	DF	(England) Nicky Shorey	6 months	May 2016	
27 April 2016	GK	(England) James Bransgrove	3 years	May 2019	
27 April 2016	DF	(England) Alex Wynter	2 years	May 2018	
6 May 2016	DF	(Republic of Ireland) Michael O'Donoghue	1 year	May 2017	
6 May 2016	MF	(England) Chris Regis	1 year	May 2017	
6 May 2016	FW	(Wales) Charley Edge	1 year	May 2017	

== Honours and awards ==
=== End-of-season awards ===
Award	Player	Notes
Player of the Year award	(England) Alex Gilbey	
Young Player of the Year award	(England) Frankie Kent	
Player's Player of the Year award	(England) Joe Edwards	
Goal of the Season award	(England) Alex Gilbey	
Community Player of the Year award	(England) Alex Wynter	
Colchester United Supporters Association Home Player of the Year award	(England) Joe Edwards	
Colchester United Supporters Association Away Player of the Year award	(England) Joe Edwards	

== See also ==
- List of Colchester United F.C. seasons
