= Michael O'Donoghue (footballer) =

Footballer (born 1996)

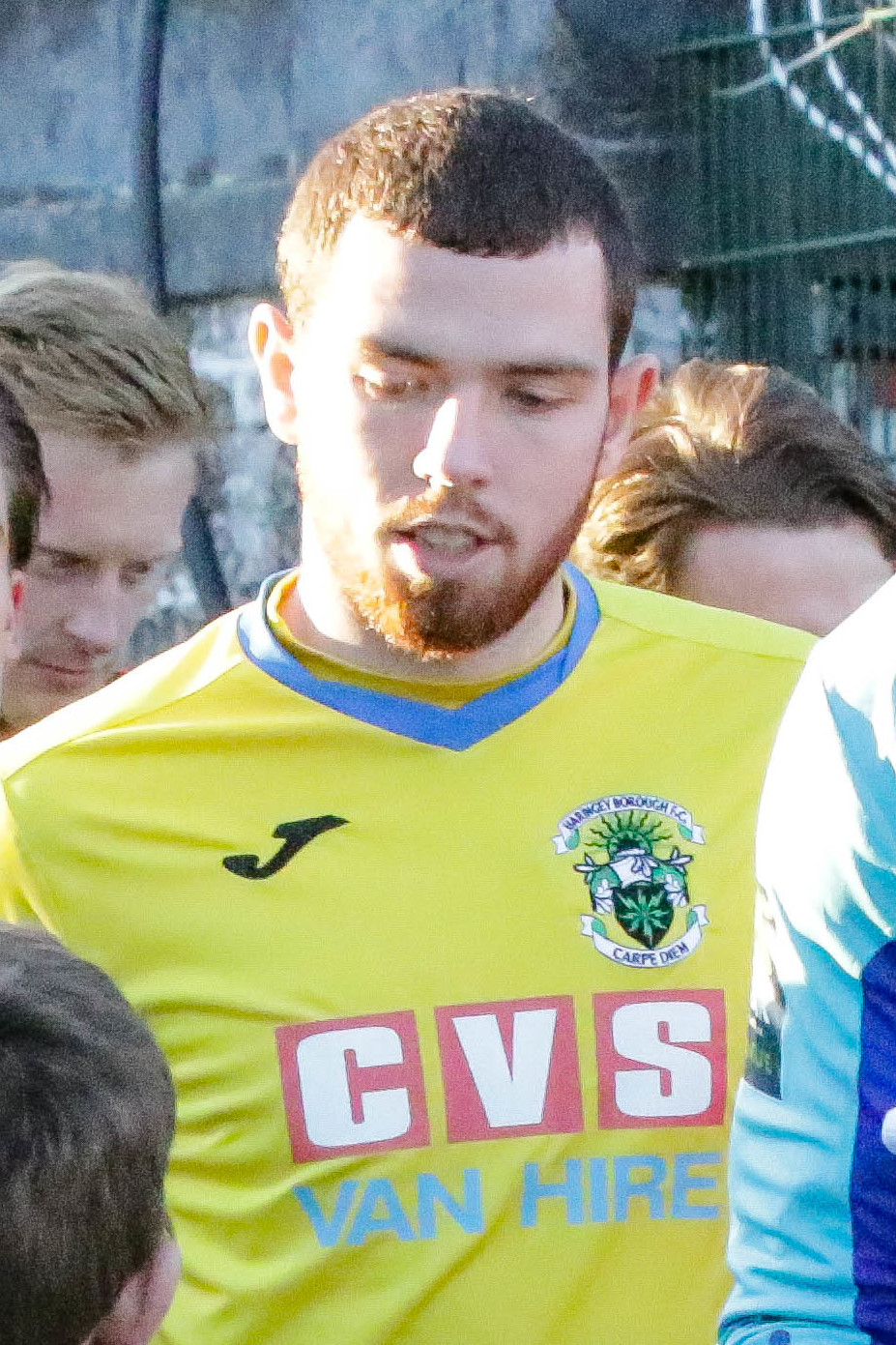
- O'Donoghue in 2018

Personal information
- Full name: Michael Derry O'Donoghue
- Date of birth: 18 January 1996 (age 30)
- Place of birth: Islington, London, England
- Height: 1.80 m (5 ft 11 in)
- Position: Left-back

Team information
- Current team: Hornchurch

Youth career
- Reading
- –2013: Leyton Orient
- 2013–2014: Colchester United

Senior career*
Years	Team	Apps	(Gls)
2014–2017	Colchester United	1	(0)
2017–2019	Haringey Borough	8	(0)
2019–2020	Concord Rangers	2	(0)
2020–2023	Haringey Borough	72	(3)
2023–	Hornchurch	20	(0)
- * Club domestic league appearances and goals as of 17:39, 21 April 2024 (UTC)

Michael Derry O'Donoghue (born 18 January 1996) is an Irish footballer who plays as a left-back for Hornchurch.

O'Donoghue joined Colchester United's Academy in 2013, having previously progressed through the Reading Academy and the Leyton Orient Academy. He made his professional debut and his only appearance for Colchester in November 2014, before leaving in January 2017 to join Haringey Borough, until 2019 moving to Concord Rangers, only to return to Haringey Borough FC in 2020.

== Career ==
Born in Islington, London, Irishman O'Donoghue joined League One club Colchester United's Academy in the summer of 2013, signing from Leyton Orient to begin his two-year scholarship with the club's academy. He had previously been signed to the Reading Academy.

During his first season with Colchester, O'Donoghue helped the under-18 side to win a league and cup double. He provided an assist for Macauley Bonne in the Youth Alliance Cup Final held against Bradford City at Valley Parade on 29 April 2014 in a 4–2 win for Colchester.

A ruptured achilles tendon injury which ruled Tosin Olufemi out for the entire 2014–15 season meant that O'Donoghue would be back-up only to Ben Gordon at left-back. Following further injuries to Magnus Okuonghae and Frankie Kent, O'Donoghue was named in the starting line-up for Colchester's League One match with Barnsley on 14 November 2014. He made his debut and played the full 90 minutes in the 3–2 defeat at Oakwell. He then set his sights on keeping his place in the team, but found himself pushed out of the starting eleven by Queens Park Rangers loanee Cole Kpekawa.

O'Donoghue was ruled out for the remainder of the season in December 2014 after rupturing cruciate ligaments during a training session. Despite his injury and with his contract expiring in the summer, O'Donoghue signed a one-year extension with Colchester on 8 May 2015.

After a season of recovery from knee surgery during 2015–16, O'Donoghue impressed enough in the development squad to earn himself a new contract, and signed a one-year extension in May 2016.

On 20 January 2017, O'Donoghue was released by Colchester United by mutual consent. He joined Isthmian League Division One North side Haringey Borough, and went straight into their starting eleven for Borough's 6–0 win over Soham Town Rangers on 21 January.

On 4 December 2023, O'Donoghue signed for Hornchurch.

== Career statistics ==
As of match played 10 March 2021.

Appearances and goals by club, season and competition
Club	Season	League			FA Cup		League Cup		Other		Total	
Club	Season	Division	Apps	Goals	Apps	Goals	Apps	Goals	Apps	Goals	Apps	Goals
Colchester United	2014–15	League One	1	0	0	0	0	0	0	0	1	0
Colchester United	2015–16	League One	0	0	0	0	0	0	0	0	0	0
Colchester United	2016–17	League Two	0	0	0	0	0	0	0	0	0	0
Colchester United	Total		1	0	0	0	0	0	0	0	1	0
Haringey Borough	2016–17	Isthmian League Division One North	8	0	–		–		0	0	8	0
Haringey Borough	2017–18	Isthmian League Division One North	0	0	0	0	0	0	0	0	0	0
Haringey Borough	2018–19	Isthmian League Premier Division	0	0	1	0	0	0	0	0	0	0
Concord Rangers	2019–20	National League South	2	0	0	0	0	0	0	0	2	0
Haringey Borough
Haringey Borough	2020–21	Isthmian League Division One North	0	0	0	0	0	0	0	0	0	0
Career total			11	0	1	0	0	0	0	0	11	0

== Honours ==
Colchester United U18

- 2013–14 Football League Youth Alliance South East winner
- 2013–14 Football League Youth Alliance Cup winner
