= 2017–18 Colchester United F.C. season =

Colchester United
2017–18 season
- Owner: Robbie Cowling
- Chairman: Robbie Cowling
- Head coach: John McGreal
- Stadium: Colchester Community Stadium
- League Two: 13th
- FA Cup: 1st round (eliminated by Oxford City)
- EFL Cup: 1st round (eliminated by Aston Villa)
- EFL Trophy: Group stage
- Top goalscorer: League: Sammie Szmodics (12); All: Sammie Szmodics (13)
- Highest home attendance: 6,603 v Aston Villa, 9 August 2017
- Lowest home attendance: 572 v Reading U23, 29 August 2017
- Average home league attendance: 3,185
- Biggest win: 5–1 v Forest Green Rovers, 26 August 2017
- Biggest defeat: 0–3 v Luton Town, 19 August 2017; 1–4 v Cheltenham Town, 6 January 2018
| Home colours | Away colours | Third colours |

The 2017–18 season was Colchester United's 81st season in their history and their second successive season competing in League Two. Along with competing in League Two, the club also participated in the FA Cup, EFL Cup and EFL Trophy.

A poor start to the new campaign meant that Colchester were chasing to catch up from the off. An upturn in form came about over the Christmas period, reaching a high of fifth in the table. Again, the U's were made to pay with a drop in late season form, where they eventually in the bottom-half of League Two. Finishing 13th, this was Colchester's worst league performance since the 1993–94 season when the U's finished 17th in the Third Division.

Colchester made a first round exit in the EFL Cup for the seventh consecutive season, narrowly losing out to Aston Villa, while in the FA Cup, they were eliminated by non-League outfit Oxford City in the first round. In the EFL Trophy, Colchester were knocked out at the group stage for the second season running.

== Season overview ==
=== Preseason ===
Colchester United announced their retainer list on 10 May 2017. Left back Matthew Briggs and fellow defender Lloyd Doyley were both released after the club decided against offering them a new contract, while under-23 players Femi Akinwande, Callum Harrison, Brendan Ocran, Dexter Peter, Rhys Williams and Ben Wyatt were also not offered new deals. Meanwhile, goalkeeper Dean Brill, defenders Richard Brindley, Tom Eastman, George Elokobi, Lewis Kinsella and Kane Vincent-Young, midfielder Charley Edge, and forwards Diaz Wright, Drey Wright and Chris Porter were all offered new deals.

Two Academy players signed one year development contracts on 25 May. Central defender Josh Pollard and forward Eoin McKeown signed their first professional deals ahead of stepping up to the under-23 squad.

Last season's top goalscorer Chris Porter opted to leave the club on the expiry of his contract, instead signing a two-year deal at League Two rivals Crewe Alexandra on 31 May after turning down a new contract offer.

Tom Eastman became the first Colchester United out of contract first-team player to sign a new deal on 28 June, agreeing to a two-year extension. The following day, Drey Wright, Lewis Kinsella, and Kane Vincent-Young all agreed to one-year extensions to their existing contracts.

With Richard Brindley turning down Colchester's contract offer, the U's announced the signing of former Gillingham right-back Ryan Jackson on 30 June, with his contract set to begin on 1 July. George Elokobi also left Colchester after failing to agree on a new contract with the club. Goalkeeper Dean Brill opted not to sign a new contract after failing to break into the first team.

On 3 July, the club announced that Charley Edge, Decarrey Sheriff and Diaz Wright had all agreed to new one-year contracts.

A restructuring of the backroom coaching staff meant Ademola Bankole left after nine years as the club's goalkeeping coach, while former Watford goalkeeper Rene Gilmartin arrived as his replacement and to provide competition to Sam Walker and Dillon Barnes. Paul Smith arrived from Southend United as Head of Academy Goalkeeper Coaching, while former Wales midfielder Chris Llewellyn joined Colchester as under-18 lead coach.

Colchester played their first pre-season friendly on 8 July 2017. In their annual friendly match against Maldon & Tiptree, the U's earned a 2–0 victory with a goal from Doug Loft in the first half, and Louis Dunne in the second half. On 11 July, Colchester played their second pre-season match against Needham Market. Goals from Denny Johnstone, Tariq Issa and two from Sammie Szmodics sealed a 4–0 victory for the visitors.

Midfielder Tarryn Allarakhia signed a one-year development contract on 12 July, joining from Maldon & Tiptree.

On 14 July, Academy product Macauley Bonne left the club to join National League side Leyton Orient, signing for an undisclosed fee alongside former U's player George Elokobi. Colchester won their third successive friendly the same day, beating Llandudno 1–0 in north Wales courtesy of a Denny Johnstone goal.

Cole Kpekawa joined Colchester for a second spell on 17 July, signing a one-year deal from Barnsley for an undisclosed fee having featured on loan from Queens Park Rangers during the 2014–15 season. Meanwhile, injury-stricken Brennan Dickenson revealed that the serious knee injury he sustained in training in April 2017 would keep him out of first-team action until February 2018.

On 18 July, Colchester recorded their fourth consecutive pre-season victory with a 2–0 win against a West Ham United XI at the Colchester Community Stadium. Drey Wright and Denny Johnstone were the goalscorers.

Colchester signed Wigan Athletic forward Mikael Mandron on 21 July. He signed for an undisclosed fee on a two-year deal. On 22 July, the U's claimed their fifth pre-season win with a 3–0 victory against Braintree Town. Sammie Szmodics scored twice and Louis Dunne added a third late on to secure the win.

On 24 July, United were hit by the news that club captain Luke Prosser would be ruled out of action for a further two months after undergoing a further operation on his injured knee.

Colchester suffered their first pre-season defeat on 25 July when they slipped to a 1–0 defeat to Ipswich Town at the Community Stadium. Another defeat followed against Gillingham on 28 July, falling to a 2–1 defeat. Colchester's goal was scored by Ryan Jackson against his former club. Colchester also confirmed the signing of defender Dan Jefferies from Swansea City who joined the under-23 side on 28 July, and midfielder Sam Warde joined the under-23s from Huddersfield Town on 31 July.

On 1 August, Colchester made two further under-23 additions, with the signing of Australian goalkeeper Dominic Kurasik from Brentford and former-Crystal Palace left-back Callum Sturgess on one-year contracts.

On the eve of the new league season, Alex Wynter had his contract cancelled by mutual consent and then immediately signed for National League side Maidstone United.

=== August ===
Colchester's League Two campaign began at Accrington Stanley on 5 August. Ryan Jackson and Mikael Mandron made the starting eleven for their debuts, while Cole Kpekawa made his second debut for the club from the substitutes bench. Accrington took a ninth-minute lead through Kayden Jackson, and went 2–0 up through Billy Kee's 32nd-minute strike. The U's found themselves 3–0 down after the break when Omar Beckles scored, but pulled a late goal back from half-time substitute Sammie Szmodics.

On 7 August, Colchester signed Coventry City winger Kyel Reid on loan until January. Dillon Barnes joined National League South side Welling United for one month on 8 August.

Colchester hosted Championship side Aston Villa in the first round of the EFL Cup on 9 August. A mistake from goalkeeper Sam Walker allowed Scott Hogan to slot in an early opening goal for the visitors. Mikael Mandron missed a chance to equalise from the penalty spot when his effort was saved by Jed Steer, before an unfortunate Frankie Kent scored an own goal to double Villa's lead on 19 minutes. Kent redeemed himself six minutes before the interval to reduce Colchester's deficit at 2–1. However, the score remained the same through the second half as Colchester exited the competition at the first round stage for the seventh consecutive season.

The U's earned their first league point of the season on 12 August when they drew 1–1 with Stevenage at the Community Stadium. Stevenage took a second-half lead through Danny Newton, but Mikael Mandron equalised 15-minutes later to score his first competitive goal for the club.

On 15 August, Colchester offered new contracts to Brennan Dickenson, Kurtis Guthrie, Frankie Kent, Tom Lapslie and Drey Wright, while winger Dion Sembie-Ferris was released by mutual consent in search of first-team football. On 18 August, it was announced that goalkeeper Daniel Wilks had joined the under-23 squad on loan from Maldon & Tiptree until January 2018, while centre-back Josh Pollard, right-back George Keys, and left winger Ryan Clampin all joined Maldon & Tiptree on youth and work experience loans. Also joining the club was defender Will Wright who joined on a two-year contract from Hitchin Town.

The U's were defeated 3–0 at Luton Town on 19 August. A first-half injury time goal put the hosts ahead and Luton added a further two in the second half to leave Colchester in the relegation zone.

Denny Johnstone made a season-long loan move to St Johnstone on 24 August, while Louis Dunne also temporarily left the club on loan, joining National League South side Concord Rangers for one month.

Colchester earned their first win of the season on 26 August in their first-ever meeting with Forest Green Rovers. Kyel Reid scored his first U's goal after only four minutes of play, before Frankie Kent scored the second goal of the game and his second of the season. Forest Green scored two minutes later to make it 2–1. Sammie Szmodics scored 20-minutes into the second half, before Kane Vincent-Young became the second player of the day to score his first Colchester goal. Three minutes into injury time, Courtney Senior, making his first-team debut from the bench, scored to finalise a 5–1 win.

In the first group stage match of the EFL Trophy, Colchester hosted Reading U23 at the Community Stadium. Sammie Szmodics continued his goalscoring form inside five minutes, but Reading equalised through Josh Barrett before taking the lead through Ben House prior to half-time. Second-half substitute Eoin McKeown, making his first-team debut, equalised in the 87th minute to take the tie to a penalty shoot-out. The U's won 6–5, earning a bonus point for the win on penalties.

With the transfer window closing at 11pm on 31 August, Colchester made numerous deadline day signings, both on loan and permanent. First, Queens Park Rangers midfielder Brandon Comley signed on loan until January 2018. Young Charlton Athletic striker Brandon Hanlan also joined on loan until January, while free agent Sanmi Odelusi signed a permanent six-month contract after the forward had been training with the U's over the summer since his release by Wigan Athletic. Another striker followed suit in signing, with Portsmouth's Nicke Kabamba arriving on loan until January, while Crystal Palace centre-half Ryan Inniss signed on loan until the end of the season.

=== September ===
Colchester started September with a defeat at Cambridge United. Naming an unchanged starting eleven from the side that beat Forest Green 5–1 the previous weekend, the U's fell to a 1–0 defeat on 2 September thanks to a second-half goal from Uche Ikpeazu.

Eli Phipps joined Dillon Barnes on loan at Welling United on 8 September, while Barnes' loan was extended until 8 November. Also heading out on loan was Charley Edge, who signed on a one-month deal at National League North side Leamington.

Colchester returned to winning ways with an impressive first-half performance against Crawley Town in a 3–1 win. Sammie Szmodics scored his fourth goal of the season before assisting Ryan Jackson's first goal for the club after 14-minutes. Mikael Mandron completed the home side's scoring after 38-minutes. In the second-half, Sam Walker saved a Mark Randall penalty, but Crawley did pull a goal back from Jimmy Smith on 66-minutes. They were then held to a 1–1 draw against Chesterfield on 12 September. Louis Reed scored for the visitors shortly before half-time but debutant Brandon Hanlan scored from the substitutes bench after 82-minutes.

Colchester's terrible away form continued on 16 September with a 3–1 defeat at Cheltenham Town. Within 15-minutes, the U's found themselves 2–0 down with both goals coming from Cheltenham's Kevin Dawson. Colchester were awarded a penalty in the 26th minute after Taylor Moore handled in the penalty area and Sammie Szmodics converted to score his fifth goal of the campaign. In the second-half, Mikael Mandron was sent off for a handball offence in the penalty area, but Brian Graham's penalty was saved by Sam Walker. Shortly afterwards, Jamie Grimes scored to complete the victory for Cheltenham and condemn Colchester to their fourth successive away defeat.

On 16 September, winger George Brown made his debut for East Thurrock United in an FA Cup win against Biggleswade Town after joining the club on loan earlier. Meanwhile, young goalkeeper Dominic Kurasik also left the club on loan to join Maldon & Tiptree, signing on 19 September.

On 21 September, Frankie Kent signed a new contract with the club to remain until summer 2020.

Colchester's next game was against old rivals Wycombe Wanderers at the Community Stadium. Despite having the better of the possession, the U's went down 1–0 after 32-minutes from a Nathan Tyson goal, but Brandon Hanlan equalised shortly before half-time to score his second goal in only his third Colchester appearance. Craig Mackail-Smith scored Wycombe's winner in the 67th minute as the visitors held on for a 2–1 victory.

The U's travelled to Grimsby Town on 26 September for a midweek league fixture. A frantic start saw Kyel Reid score the opener, before JJ Hooper equalised two minutes later. In the second-half, Reid scored his second of the game, but an 89th-minute penalty from Sam Jones shared the spoils.

On 30 September, Colchester recorded a 1–0 away win at Yeovil Town, their first away victory of the season. Sean Murray's first goal for the club proved to be the difference between the sides as the U's moved up to 16th in the League Two table.

=== October ===
October began with a narrow 1–0 defeat in the EFL Trophy at home to Gillingham on 3 October. An injury-time winner from Max Ehmer was enough to separate the two sides.

Colchester earned their first successive league win of the season on 7 October by beating Mansfield Town 2–0 at the Community Stadium. Sean Murray followed up his debut goal for the club with another the following weekend after 29-minutes, before Mikael Mandron doubled the U's lead five minutes later.

The U's hosted Carlisle United on 14 October, losing 1–0 in a close affair in which Colchester mostly dominated.

On 16 October, Diaz Wright joined Needham Market on loan until the end of November, while Colchester were drawn at home to Oxford City in the first round of the FA Cup which would be the first-ever meeting between the two clubs.

They returned to winning ways three days later with an away victory at Newport County ending the home sides' ten game unbeaten home record which stretched back to March. Following a goalless first-half, former County defender Ryan Jackson scored his second goal of the season after 72-minutes, before Mikael Mandron added a second five minutes later. Shawn McCoulsky pulled a goal back for Newport on 86-minutes but the U's held on to record a 2–1 win. A 0–0 draw at Coventry City followed, a match in which Tom Lapslie was sent off following two bookings in less than a minute after a yellow card for a foul and then a red card for a deliberate handball.

Colchester closed out October to come from behind and win at home to Crewe Alexandra on 28 October. Jordan Bowery gave Crewe a 22nd-minute lead, but this was cancelled out by Mikael Mandron's fifth goal of the season six minutes before half-time. The U's took the lead on the hour mark when Tom Eastman headed in his first goal of the campaign, before Mandron scored his second of the game on 71-minutes to round off a 3–1 victory.

As a result of collecting ten points in five league games through October, John McGreal was nominated for the October EFL League Two Manager of the Month award. Meanwhile, Mikael Mandron, who scored four goals in five league games during October was nominated for the EFL League Two Player of the Month award.

=== November ===
Colchester were knocked out of the FA Cup in the first round by Oxford City on 4 November. The U's fell to a 1–0 defeat at the Community Stadium. This was followed up by an EFL Trophy Essex derby defeat to Southend United, who won 2–0 to knock Colchester out of the competition at the group stage for the second successive season.

Returning to league competition on 11 November, Sammie Szmodics scored his sixth goal of the season from the bench to earn Colchester a 1–0 win at Barnet. They were then held to a 0–0 draw at home against Morecambe on 18 November to extend their unbeaten run to five league games. Their good run continued on 21 November when Sammie Szmodics again proved the difference with an early goal in Colchester's 1–0 home win against Lincoln City.

During their away game at Notts County on 25 November, following a goalless first-half, County took the lead when Shola Ameobi scored from the penalty spot after Mikael Mandron fouled Ryan Yates in the area. Mandron later missed a penalty kick of his own after Ryan Jackson was fouled by Jorge Grant. However, Colchester looked to have secured a point when substitute Sanmi Odelusi scored his first goal for the club and levelled the match in the 89th minute. Ryan Yates then scored in the third minute of injury time to hand the home team a 2–1 victory.

=== December ===
Following a two-week break due to their early FA Cup exit, Colchester returned to action in a home match against Exeter City on 9 December. The U's were gifted the lead when Troy Archibald-Henville scored an own goal after 23-minutes. Then, three minutes later, Sammie Szmodics scored from the penalty spot after Kane Vincent-Young was brought down in the box by Jake Taylor. Colchester then scored a third goal in seven minutes as Szmodics netted his ninth of the season. Exeter pulled a goal back in the second half through Jayden Stockley as Colchester held on to a 3–1 victory.

Forward Nicke Kabamba made an early return to parent club Portsmouth on 14 December after failing to score in ten appearances for the U's.

On 15 December, Colchester won a five-goal thriller at Swindon Town to promote themselves into the play-off positions. They fell behind on 36-minutes from a Kaiyne Woolery goal before Frankie Kent scored an equaliser from a corner kick in first half injury time. Mikael Mandron then put the U's ahead on 63-minutes, but then Swindon equalised through Kellan Gordon. Two minutes later, Colchester had the lead again as Sammie Szmodics beat a man to record his tenth goal of the campaign.

On 21 December, forward Sanmi Odelusi was told that his contract would not be renewed when it expired on 31 December.

Sammie Szmodics scored his tenth league goal of the season in Colchester's 1–1 home draw with Port Vale on 23 December. He opened the scoring after 32-minutes, but Vale equalised in the second half through Marcus Harness. They then secured a 2–0 win at Crawley Town on Boxing Day. A goal in either half from Mikael Mandron and Sammie Szmodics secured victory which moved the U's up to fifth position in the league table.

In the final game of 2017, Chesterfield held the U's to a 0–0 draw at the Proact Stadium.

Following an unbeaten December including three wins and two draws, Sammie Szmodics was nominated for League Two Player of the Month, becoming the second Colchester player of the season to receive the nomination, while John McGreal was nominated for the League Two Manager of the Month award for a second time this campaign. On 12 January, it was revealed Szmodics was named as Player of the Month for League Two.

=== January ===
Colchester recorded their second consecutive goalless draw at home to Cambridge United on New Year's Day to remain 8th in League Two.

On 3 January, Craig Slater moved to Scottish Championship side Dundee United on loan until the end of the season. The U's bolstered their forward line with two signings from Maldon & Tiptree. Incoming were Junior Ogedi-Uzokwe, who had scored 34 goals in 34 games this season and was the top scorer in the Isthmian League, and also left-sided player Ryan Gondoh. The following day, Lewis Kinsella and Tommy O'Sullivan both left the club in loan deals. Kinsella joined National League side Aldershot Town initially until early February, while O'Sullivan signed for fellow National League side Torquay United until the end of the campaign.

Colchester suffered their joint-worst defeat of the season so far on 6 January as they crashed to a 4–1 home defeat by Cheltenham Town. Kurtis Guthrie started his first league game of the season and scored on 40 minutes to hand the U's a 1–0 advantage going in to the interval. However, Kyel Reid was sent off for violent conduct just a minute before half-time. Cheltenham got back into the game through Sanmi Odelusi registering a debut goal and his first since his switch from Colchester. The floodgates then opened as Nigel Atangana, Jerell Sellars and Mohamed Eisa each scored to give the away side all three points.

On 8 January, young centre forward Eoin McKeown rejoined Maldon & Tiptree on loan until the end of the season.

The U's recorded their second successive defeat for the first time since September as they fell to a 3–1 defeat at Wycombe on 13 January. Adebayo Akinfenwa scored the host's opener after 14-minutes and then their lead was doubled by Paris Cowan-Hall on 24-minutes. With 15-minutes remaining, Wycombe scored a third through Luke O'Nien, before Sammie Szmodics pulled a goal back for Colchester four minutes later. The game did however see the first appearance of the season for club captain Luke Prosser.

On 17 January, Brandon Comley joined Colchester permanently, signing for an undisclosed fee. He joined on a 2 1/2-year contract.

Colchester were held to a 1–1 draw at home against Grimsby on 20 January. The visitors took the lead through Charles Vernam on 38-minutes, but Sean Murray's equaliser shortly after the break earned a point for the U's.

The U's made a defensive signing on 24 January by bringing in Millwall youngster Paul Rooney on a 1 1/2-year contract for an undisclosed fee. Leaving the club on loan for a second spell in the National League South was goalkeeper Dillon Barnes, who joined Hemel Hempstead Town for an initial month-long loan on 26 January.

On 27 January, Colchester conceded a late goal to draw at Port Vale. Courtney Senior scored on his first start for the club to give the U's the lead after 12-minutes, only for David Worrall to equalise on 33-minutes. Four minutes in to first-half injury time, Drey Wright scored his first goal of the season to again hand the lead to Colchester. However, Worrall scored again in the 87th minute to rescue a point for the home side and leave the U's without a win in six games.

Transfer deadline day fell on 31 January and the club's first business of the day was the signing of Queens Park Rangers winger Olamide Shodipo on loan until the end of the season. They also signed Doncaster Rovers forward Liam Mandeville on loan until the end of the season, while Lewis Kinsella, who was on loan at Aldershot Town, had his contract cancelled by mutual consent. He then signed a permanent deal with Aldershot. Also on the way out was under-23s defender Dan Jefferies who joined Scottish Premiership side Dundee. Aaron Barnes arrived on a permanent basis from Charlton Athletic, while Ben Stevenson signed on loan from Wolverhampton Wanderers after joining the Championship side from Coventry City earlier in the day.

=== February ===
After signing for Colchester on 31 January, Aaron Barnes rejoined Torquay United on loan until the end of the season on 1 February, having previously been on loan there from Charlton earlier in January. On 2 February, Cameron James headed out on loan for the remainder of the season to National League South side and his hometown club Chelmsford City.

On 3 February, Colchester recorded their first win of 2018. Following a goalless first-half with Newport County, substitute and debutant Ben Stevenson scored ten minutes after arriving on the pitch, before Tom Eastman doubled the U's lead after a goal mouth scramble. The two sides swapped places in the League Two table on the back of the result. They followed this up with a 1–1 draw at Carlisle, Courtney Senior scoring the goal for the U's on 10 February. The U's then won 2–1 at home against Coventry City. Junior Ogedi-Uzokwe scored on his first start for the club from the penalty spot on 27-minutes, but on 56-minutes, Tom Bayliss scored an equaliser for the visitors. Two minutes from time, Mikael Mandron converted an Ogedi-Uzokwe cross to seal the win for the U's. Colchester's patchy form then continued with a 1–0 defeat at Crewe on 17 February, and then a further 1–0 defeat against Barnet at home on 24 February.

=== March ===
Diaz Wright signed for Braintree Town on loan on 9 March.

Automatic promotion hopefuls Mansfield Town hosted the U's on 10 March. They took the lead through Kane Hemmings after 22-minutes, but after the break Colchester levelled through Brandon Comley, his first-ever professional goal. The U's held on to earn a point but slipped into the bottom-half of the table.

On 16 March, Charley Edge joined Needham Market on loan until the end of the season.

Colchester missed an opportunity to take an early lead against Yeovil on 17 March after Sammie Szmodics had an eighth-minute penalty kick saved by Stuart Nelson. The visitors then took the lead in the 21st minute from an Alex Fisher goal. Yeovil held on to record a 1–0 victory and leave Colchester nine points adrift of the play-off positions. They were then held to a 0–0 draw at Morecambe on 20 March.

The U's earned their first win in five and their first away victory in 2018 on 24 March as they defeated Stevenage 1–0 at Broadhall Way. Mikael Mandron's first-half goal proved to be the difference between the sides.

On 29 March, Kurtis Guthrie had his contract with the club cancelled by mutual consent, with his final appearance arriving in the 1–0 defeat by Yeovil on 17 March when he had an on-field confrontation with Sammie Szmodics over taking Colchester's penalty kick.

Colchester earned their first back-to-back victories since December with a 2–1 win over promotion-chasing Luton Town at the Community Stadium in their Good Friday fixture. The tie was marred by the serious injury to Hatters' midfielder Luke Berry in only the second minute of the game when his leg was accidentally caught by U's midfielder Tom Lapslie in a challenge. Both sets of players were taken off the pitch while Berry received eleven minutes of treatment on the field before being taken to hospital. When play resumed, Tom Eastman scored the opening goal after 15-minutes of play, before Luke Prosser doubled the advantage for the home side with his first goal for the club. Late in the second-half, Ryan Jackson fouled Luke Gambin in the penalty area which was converted by Danny Hylton but Colchester held on for victory.

=== April ===
For the first time this season, and the first time since December 2016, Colchester earned a third consecutive league victory in their first-ever visit to The New Lawn stadium when they faced Forest Green Rovers. Drey Wright scored within 19-seconds to give the visitors an early advantage, but the U's were pegged back when Tom Eastman fouled Haydn Hollis in the box and Reuben Reid converted. Early in the second-half, Colchester's lead was restored when Ben Stevenson scored 90-seconds after the interval. Again, Colchester held on to their single goal advantage to take victory. However, Colchester's run was halted by league-leaders Accrington Stanley on 7 April who claimed a 1–0 win at the Community Stadium.

On 13 April, after failing to make an appearance since January, Cole Kpekawa left the club by mutual consent.

Colchester fell to their second successive home defeat on 14 April when Notts County earned a 3–1 win at the Community Stadium. Drey Wright had opened the scoring within the first ten minutes of play, but a revival in the second half by County through Jonathan Forte, Shola Ameobi and Richard Duffy saw the away side claim victory.

On 18 April, having broken into the first-team, Courtney Senior signed a new two-year contract with the club. He then stepped off the bench in his next game against Lincoln City to score the equaliser for Colchester after they had fallen behind five minutes earlier to an Elliott Whitehouse penalty. In the 83rd minute of the game, with the scores at 1–1, Michael Bostwick was sent off for the home side, but the U's couldn't capitalise on their man advantage, and went on to lose 2–1 when substitute Luke Waterfall headed in the winner in the fourth minute of added time. The result ended Colchester's faint play-off hopes as they ended the day ten points behind seventh-placed Coventry with just two games remaining.

Goalkeeper Dillon Barnes was handed his first league start for Colchester on 28 April in their final home game of the season against Swindon Town, and he kept a clean sheet as the match finished 0–0. Ryan Gondoh was also introduced as a second-half substitute to make his debut for the club.

The U's completed their season with a whimper on 5 May as they were beaten 1–0 at Exeter City on 5 May, meaning they finished 13th in the league table, their worst league performance for 24 years.

== Players ==
As of 5 May 2018

| No. | Name | Position | Nat. | Place of birth | Date of birth | Apps | Goals | Signed from | Date signed | Fee |
Goalkeepers
| 1 | Sam Walker | GK | (England) | Gravesend | 2 October 1991 (aged 25) | 166 | 0 | (England) Chelsea | 20 January 2014 | Free transfer |
| 25 | Dillon Barnes | GK | (England) | Enfield Town | 8 April 1996 (aged 21) | 2 | 0 | (England) Bedford Town | 1 September 2015 | Free transfer |
| 29 | Rene Gilmartin | GK | (Republic of Ireland) | Dublin | 31 May 1987 (aged 30) | 0 | 0 | (England) Watford | 7 July 2017 | Free transfer |
Defenders
| 2 | Ryan Jackson | RB | (England) | Streatham | 31 July 1990 (aged 26) | 0 | 0 | (England) Gillingham | 1 July 2017 | Free transfer |
| 5 | Luke Prosser (c) | CB | (England) | Enfield | 28 May 1988 (aged 29) | 17 | 0 | (England) Southend United | 22 June 2015 | Free transfer |
| 6 | Frankie Kent | CB | (England) | Havering | 21 November 1995 (aged 21) | 56 | 0 | Academy | 1 August 2013 | Free transfer |
| 11 | Brennan Dickenson | LWB/LW/FW | (England) | Ferndown | 26 February 1993 (aged 24) | 39 | 12 | (England) Gillingham | 29 June 2016 | Free transfer |
| 18 | Tom Eastman | CB | (England) | Colchester | 21 October 1991 (aged 25) | 235 | 11 | (England) Ipswich Town | 19 May 2011 | Free transfer |
| 22 | Kane Vincent-Young | LB/RB | (England) | Camden | 15 March 1996 (aged 21) | 39 | 0 | Academy | 23 September 2014 | Free transfer |
| 35 | Cameron James | CB/FB/DM | (England) | Chelmsford | 11 February 1998 (aged 19) | 16 | 0 | Academy | 15 July 2015 | Free transfer |
| 40 | JJ Wilson | LB | (England) | Westminster | | 0 | 0 | Academy | 30 June 2016 | Free transfer |
| 43 | Josh Pollard | CB | (England) | Colchester | | 0 | 0 | Academy | 25 May 2017 | Free transfer |
| 46 | Paul Rooney | DF | (Republic of Ireland) | Dublin | 22 March 1997 (aged 20) | 0 | 0 | (England) Millwall | 24 January 2018 | Undisclosed |
| 48 | Will Wright | CB/RB | (England) | | 12 June 1997 (aged 19) | 0 | 0 | (England) Hitchin Town | 18 August 2017 | Undisclosed |
| | Aaron Barnes | FB | (England) | Croydon | 14 October 1996 (aged 20) | 0 | 0 | (England) Charlton Athletic | 31 January 2018 | Undisclosed |
Midfielders
| 4 | Tom Lapslie | CM | (England) | Waltham Forest | 5 October 1995 (aged 21) | 64 | 3 | Academy | 25 April 2013 | Free transfer |
| 8 | Doug Loft | MF | (England) | Maidstone | 25 December 1986 (aged 30) | 9 | 0 | (England) Gillingham | 1 July 2016 | Free transfer |
| 10 | Sammie Szmodics | AM | (England) | Colchester | 24 September 1995 (aged 21) | 74 | 10 | Academy | 1 July 2013 | Free transfer |
| 14 | Brandon Comley | MF | (Montserrat) | (England) Islington | 18 November 1995 (aged 21) | 0 | 0 | (England) QPR | 17 January 2018 | Undisclosed |
| 16 | Sean Murray | AM | (Republic of Ireland) | (England) Abbots Langley | 11 October 1993 (aged 23) | 16 | 0 | (England) Swindon Town | 31 January 2017 | Free transfer |
| 23 | Tommy O'Sullivan | CM | (Wales) | Mountain Ash | 18 January 1995 (aged 22) | 3 | 0 | (Wales) Cardiff City | 20 January 2017 | Undisclosed |
| 24 | Craig Slater | CM | (Scotland) | Glasgow | 26 April 1994 (aged 23) | 32 | 3 | (Scotland) Kilmarnock | 7 July 2016 | Undisclosed |
| 32 | Diaz Wright | MF | (England) | Greenwich | 22 February 1998 (aged 19) | 1 | 0 | Academy | 30 June 2016 | Free transfer |
| 33 | Louis Dunne | MF | (Republic of Ireland) | (England) Colchester | 7 September 1998 (aged 18) | 5 | 0 | Academy | 1 July 2015 | Free transfer |
| | Arjanit Krasniqi | MF | (Kosovo) | Westminster | 1999 | 0 | 0 | (England) Waltham Forest | 31 January 2018 | Undisclosed |
| | Sam Warde | MF | (Republic of Ireland) | Limerick | | 0 | 0 | (England) Huddersfield Town | 20 July 2017 | Free transfer |
Forwards
| 7 | Drey Wright | WG | (England) | Greenwich | 30 April 1995 (aged 22) | 101 | 6 | Academy | 10 May 2012 | Free transfer |
| 9 | Denny Johnstone | CF | (Scotland) | Dumfries | 9 January 1995 (aged 22) | 32 | 2 | (England) Birmingham City | 28 June 2016 | Undisclosed |
| 19 | Mikael Mandron | CF | (France) | Boulogne-sur-Mer | 11 October 1994 (aged 22) | 0 | 0 | (England) Wigan Athletic | 21 July 2017 | Undisclosed |
| 20 | Courtney Senior | WG | (England) | Croydon | 30 June 1997 (aged 19) | 0 | 0 | (England) Brentford | 28 June 2016 | Free transfer |
| 27 | Junior Ogedi-Uzokwe | FW | (Nigeria) | | 20 March 1994 (aged 23) | 0 | 0 | (England) Maldon & Tiptree | 3 January 2018 | Undisclosed |
| 31 | Tariq Issa | FW | (England) | | 2 September 1997 (aged 19) | 1 | 0 | Academy | 15 July 2015 | Free transfer |
| 34 | Decarrey Sheriff | FW | (England) | Southwark | 18 February 1998 (aged 19) | 0 | 0 | Academy | 30 June 2016 | Free transfer |
| 36 | Ryan Gondoh | LW | (England) | Sutton | 6 June 1997 (aged 19) | 0 | 0 | (England) Maldon & Tiptree | 3 January 2018 | Undisclosed |
| 37 | George Brown | WG | (England) | Romford | 3 March 1998 (aged 19) | 0 | 0 | Academy | 30 June 2016 | Free transfer |
| 38 | Eli Phipps | FW | (Wales) | Merthyr Tydfil | 29 July 1997 (aged 19) | 0 | 0 | (England) Cardiff City | 18 January 2017 | Undisclosed |
| 39 | Charley Edge | WG | (Wales) | Aberystwyth | 14 May 1997 (aged 20) | 1 | 0 | Academy | 6 May 2016 | Free transfer |
| 41 | Tarryn Allarakhia | WG | (England) | Redbridge | 17 October 1997 (aged 19) | 0 | 0 | (England) Maldon & Tiptree | 12 July 2017 | Free transfer |
| 42 | Eoin McKeown | CF | (England) | Westminster | 5 November 1998 (aged 18) | 0 | 0 | Academy | 25 May 2017 | Free transfer |
| 44 | Ryan Clampin | LW | (England) | Colchester | 29 January 1999 (aged 18) | 0 | 0 | Academy | | Free transfer |
| 45 | Ollie Sims | WG | (England) | Bury St Edmunds | 29 March 2001 (aged 16) | 0 | 0 | Academy | | Free transfer |

== Transfers and contracts ==
=== In ===
| Date | Position | Nationality | Name | From | Fee | Ref. |
|---|---|---|---|---|---|---|
| 25 May 2017 | CB | (England) | Josh Pollard | Academy | Free transfer | |
| 25 May 2017 | CF | (England) | Eoin McKeown | Academy | Free transfer | |
| 1 July 2017 | RB | (England) | Ryan Jackson | (England) Gillingham | Free transfer | |
| 7 July 2017 | GK | (Republic of Ireland) | Rene Gilmartin | (England) Watford | Free transfer | |
| 12 July 2017 | MF | (England) | Tarryn Allarakhia | (England) Maldon & Tiptree | Free transfer | |
| 17 July 2017 | LB | (England) | Cole Kpekawa | (England) Barnsley | Undisclosed | |
| 21 July 2017 | CF | (France) | Mikael Mandron | (England) Wigan Athletic | Undisclosed | |
| 28 July 2017 | CB | (Wales) | Dan Jefferies | (Wales) Swansea City | Free transfer | |
| 31 July 2017 | MF | (Republic of Ireland) | Sam Warde | (England) Huddersfield Town | Free transfer | |
| 1 August 2017 | GK | (Australia) | Dominic Kurasik | (England) Brentford | Free transfer | |
| 1 August 2017 | LB | (England) | Callum Sturgess | (England) Crystal Palace | Free transfer | |
| 18 August 2017 | CB/RB | (England) | Will Wright | (England) Hitchin Town | Free transfer | |
| 31 August 2017 | FW | (England) | Sanmi Odelusi | (England) Wigan Athletic | Free transfer | |
| 3 January 2018 | LW | (England) | Ryan Gondoh | (England) Maldon & Tiptree | Undisclosed | |
| 3 January 2018 | FW | (England) | Junior Ogedi-Uzokwe | (England) Maldon & Tiptree | Undisclosed | |
| 17 January 2018 | MF | (Montserrat) | Brandon Comley | (England) Queens Park Rangers | Undisclosed | |
| 24 January 2018 | DF | (Republic of Ireland) | Paul Rooney | (England) Millwall | Undisclosed | |
| 31 January 2018 | FB | (England) | Aaron Barnes | (England) Charlton Athletic | Undisclosed | |
| 31 January 2018 | MF | (Kosovo) | Arjanit Krasniqi | (England) Waltham Forest | Undisclosed | |

=== Out ===
| Date | Position | Nationality | Name | To | Fee | Ref. |
|---|---|---|---|---|---|---|
| 10 May 2017 | GK | (Wales) | Rhys Williams | (Wales) Connah's Quay Nomads (Note: Following Rhys Williams' release by Colchester United, he later joined Connah's Quay Nomads.) | Released | |
| 10 May 2017 | LB | (Guyana) | Matthew Briggs | (England) Chesterfield (Note: Following Matthew Briggs' release by Colchester United, he later joined Chesterfield.) | Released | |
| 10 May 2017 | FB | (Jamaica) | Lloyd Doyley | (England) Hemel Hempstead Town (Note: Following Lloyd Doyley's release by Colchester United, he later joined Hemel Hempstead Town.) | Released | |
| 10 May 2017 | FB | (England) | Brendan Ocran | (England) Billericay Town (Note: Following Brendan Ocran's release by Colchester United, he later joined Billericay Town.) | Released | |
| 10 May 2017 | CB | (England) | Dexter Peter | (England) Concord Rangers (Note: Following Dexter Peter's release by Colchester United, he later joined Concord Rangers.) | Released | |
| 10 May 2017 | LB | (England) | Ben Wyatt | (England) Braintree Town (Note: Following Ben Wyatt's release by Colchester United, he later joined Braintree Town.) | Released | |
| 10 May 2017 | MF | (England) | Callum Harrison | (England) Needham Market (Note: Following Callum Harrison's release by Colchester United, he later joined Needham Market.) | Released | |
| 10 May 2017 | ST | (England) | Femi Akinwande | (England) East Thurrock United (Note: Following Femi Akinwande's release by Colchester United, he later joined East Thurrock United.) | Released | |
| 31 May 2017 | CF | (England) | Chris Porter | (England) Crewe Alexandra | Free transfer | |
| 30 June 2017 | GK | (England) | Dean Brill | (England) Leyton Orient (Note: Following Dean Brill's release by Colchester United, he later joined Leyton Orient.) | Free transfer | |
| 30 June 2017 | RB | (England) | Richard Brindley | (England) Barnet (Note: Following Richard Brindley's release by Colchester United, he later joined Barnet.) | Free transfer | |
| 30 June 2017 | CB | (Cameroon) | George Elokobi | (England) Leyton Orient (Note: Following George Elokobi's release by Colchester United, he later joined Leyton Orient.) | Free transfer | |
| 14 July 2017 | CF | (Zimbabwe) | Macauley Bonne | (England) Leyton Orient | Undisclosed | |
| 4 August 2017 | CB/FB | (England) | Alex Wynter | (England) Maidstone United | Released | |
| 15 August 2017 | WG | (England) | Dion Sembie-Ferris | (England) St Neots Town (Note: Following Dion Sembie-Ferris' release by Colchester United, he later joined St Neots Town.) | Released | |
| 31 December 2017 | FW | (England) | Sanmi Odelusi | (England) Cheltenham Town (Note: Following Sanmi Odelusi's release by Colchester United, he later joined Cheltenham Town.) | Released | |
| 31 January 2018 | LB | (England) | Lewis Kinsella | (England) Aldershot Town | Released | |
| 31 January 2018 | CB | (Wales) | Dan Jefferies | (Scotland) Dundee | Undisclosed | |
| 29 March 2018 | CF | (England) | Kurtis Guthrie | (England) Stevenage (Note: Following Kurtis Guthrie's release by Colchester United, he later joined Stevenage.) | Released | |
| 13 April 2018 | LB | (England) | Cole Kpekawa | (Scotland) St Mirren (Note: Following Cole Kpekawa's release by Colchester United, he later joined St Mirren.) | Released | |

=== Loans in ===
| Date | Position | Nationality | Name | From | End date | Ref. |
|---|---|---|---|---|---|---|
| 7 August 2017 | WG | (England) | Kyel Reid | (England) Coventry City | 11 January 2018 | |
| 18 August 2017 | GK | (England) | Daniel Wilks | (England) Maldon & Tiptree | January 2018 | |
| 31 August 2017 | MF | (Montserrat) | Brandon Comley | (England) Queens Park Rangers | 17 January 2018 | |
| 31 August 2017 | FW | (England) | Brandon Hanlan | (England) Charlton Athletic | 18 January 2018 | |
| 31 August 2017 | FW | (England) | Nicke Kabamba | (England) Portsmouth | 14 December 2017 | |
| 31 August 2017 | CB | (England) | Ryan Inniss | (England) Crystal Palace | End of season | |
| 31 January 2018 | WG | (Republic of Ireland) | Olamide Shodipo | (England) Queens Park Rangers | End of season | |
| 31 January 2018 | FW | (England) | Liam Mandeville | (England) Doncaster Rovers | End of season | |
| 31 January 2018 | MF | (England) | Ben Stevenson | (England) Wolverhampton Wanderers | End of season | |

=== Loans out ===
| Date | Position | Nationality | Name | To | End date | Ref. |
|---|---|---|---|---|---|---|
| 8 August 2017 | GK | (England) | Dillon Barnes | (England) Welling United | 11 November 2017 | (Note: On 8 September 2017, Dillon Barnes' loan was extended until 11 November 2017) |
| 18 August 2017 | RB | (England) | George Keys | (England) Maldon & Tiptree | November 2017 | |
| 18 August 2017 | CB | (England) | Josh Pollard | (England) Maldon & Tiptree | January 2018 | |
| 18 August 2017 | LW | (England) | Ryan Clampin | (England) Maldon & Tiptree | End of season | |
| 24 August 2017 | CF | (Scotland) | Denny Johnstone | (Scotland) St Johnstone | End of season | |
| 25 August 2017 | MF | (Republic of Ireland) | Louis Dunne | (England) Concord Rangers | September 2017 | |
| 8 September 2017 | FW | (Wales) | Eli Phipps | (England) Welling United | December 2017 | (Note: On 11 October 2017, Eli Phipps' loan was extended until 4 November 2017) |
| 9 September 2017 | WG | (Wales) | Charley Edge | (England) Leamington | October 2017 | |
| 16 September 2017 | WG | (England) | George Brown | (England) East Thurrock United | 13 October 2017 | |
| 19 September 2017 | GK | (Australia) | Dominic Kurasik | (England) Maldon & Tiptree | 1 January 2018 | |
| 1 October 2017 | DF | (England) | Ollie Kensdale | (England) Maldon & Tiptree | October 2017 | |
| 16 October 2017 | MF | (England) | Diaz Wright | (England) Needham Market | November 2017 | |
| 24 November 2017 | AM | (England) | Dean Ager | (England) Bishop's Stortford | February 2018 | |
| 3 January 2018 | CM | (Scotland) | Craig Slater | (Scotland) Dundee United | End of season | |
| 4 January 2018 | LB | (England) | Lewis Kinsella | (England) Aldershot Town | February 2018 | |
| 4 January 2018 | CM | (Wales) | Tommy O'Sullivan | (England) Torquay United | End of season | |
| 6 January 2018 | RB | (England) | George Keys | (England) Brightlingsea Regent | March 2018 | (Note: On 7 February 2018, George Keys' loan was extended until March 2018) |
| 8 January 2018 | CF | (England) | Eoin McKeown | (England) Maldon & Tiptree | End of season | |
| 19 January 2018 | DF | (England) | Callum Sturgess | (England) Needham Market | End of season | |
| 22 January 2018 | WG | (England) | George Brown | (England) Maldon & Tiptree | February 2018 | |
| 26 January 2018 | GK | (England) | Dillon Barnes | (England) Hemel Hempstead Town | February 2018 | |
| 1 February 2018 | FB | (England) | Aaron Barnes | (England) Torquay United | End of season | |
| 2 February 2018 | CB/FB/DM | (England) | Cameron James | (England) Chelmsford City | End of season | |
| 24 February 2018 | CB | (England) | Josh Pollard | (England) Harlow Town | End of season | |
| 24 February 2018 | WG | (England) | Ollie Sims | (England) Brightlingsea Regent | March 2018 | |
| 9 March 2018 | MF | (England) | Diaz Wright | (England) Braintree Town | April 2018 | |
| 16 March 2018 | WG | (Wales) | Charley Edge | (England) Needham Market | End of season | |

=== Contracts ===
New contracts and contract extensions.

| Date | Position | Nationality | Name | Length | Expiry | Ref. |
|---|---|---|---|---|---|---|
| 25 May 2017 | CB | (England) | Josh Pollard | 1 year | June 2018 | |
| 25 May 2017 | CF | (England) | Eoin McKeown | 1 year | June 2018 | |
| 28 June 2017 | CB | (England) | Tom Eastman | 2 years | June 2019 | |
| 29 June 2017 | LB | (England) | Lewis Kinsella | 1 year | June 2018 | |
| 29 June 2017 | LB/RB | (England) | Kane Vincent-Young | 1 year | June 2018 | |
| 29 June 2017 | WG | (England) | Drey Wright | 1 year | June 2018 | |
| 1 July 2017 | RB | (England) | Ryan Jackson | 2 years | June 2019 | |
| 3 July 2017 | MF | (England) | Diaz Wright | 1 year | June 2018 | |
| 3 July 2017 | WG | (Wales) | Charley Edge | 1 year | June 2018 | |
| 3 July 2017 | FW | (England) | Decarrey Sheriff | 1 year | June 2018 | |
| 12 July 2017 | MF | (England) | Tarryn Allarakhia | 1 year | June 2018 | |
| 17 July 2017 | LB | (England) | Cole Kpekawa | 1 year | June 2018 | |
| 21 July 2017 | CF | (France) | Mikael Mandron | 2 years | June 2019 | |
| 31 July 2017 | MF | (Republic of Ireland) | Sam Warde | 1 year | June 2018 | |
| 1 August 2017 | GK | (Australia) | Dominic Kurasik | 1 year | June 2018 | |
| 1 August 2017 | LB | (England) | Callum Sturgess | 1 year | June 2018 | |
| 18 August 2017 | CB/RB | (England) | Will Wright | 2 years | June 2019 | |
| 31 August 2017 | FW | (England) | Sanmi Odelusi | 4 months | January 2018 | |
| 21 September 2017 | CB | (England) | Frankie Kent | 3 years | June 2020 | |
| 3 January 2018 | LW | (England) | Ryan Gondoh | 1 1/2 years | June 2019 | |
| 3 January 2018 | FW | (England) | Junior Ogedi-Uzokwe | 1 1/2 years | June 2019 | |
| 17 January 2018 | MF | (Montserrat) | Brandon Comley | 2 1/2 years | June 2020 | |
| 24 January 2018 | DF | (Republic of Ireland) | Paul Rooney | 1 1/2 years | June 2019 | |
| 18 April 2018 | WG | (England) | Courtney Senior | 2 years | June 2020 | |

== Match details ==
=== Preseason friendlies ===
Colchester United arranged six pre-season friendlies, against Braintree Town, Ipswich Town, Maldon & Tiptree, West Ham United XI, Welsh Premier League side Llandudno, Needham Market, and Gillingham.

| 8 July 2017 Friendly | Maldon & Tiptree | 0–2 | Colchester United | Maldon |
| 15:00 BST | | Report | Loft 43'; Dunne 55' | Stadium: Wallace Binder Ground |

| 11 July 2017 Friendly | Needham Market | 0–4 | Colchester United | Needham Market |
| 19:00 BST | | Report; Report | Johnstone 25'; Issa 80'; Szmodics 88', 89' | Stadium: Bloomfields; Attendance: 261 |

| 14 July 2017 Friendly | (Wales) Llandudno | 0–1 | Colchester United | Llandudno |
| 19:00 BST | | Report | Johnstone 27' | Stadium: Maesdu Park; Attendance: 342 |

| 18 July 2017 Friendly | Colchester United | 2–0 | West Ham United XI | Colchester |
| 19:45 BST | Wright 5'; Johnstone 60' | Report | | Stadium: Colchester Community Stadium; Attendance: 2,626; Referee: Tim Robinson |

| 22 July 2017 Friendly | Braintree Town | 0–3 | Colchester United | Braintree |
| 15:00 BST | | Report | Szmodics 26', 62'; Dunne 82' | Stadium: Cressing Road; Attendance: 619; Referee: Carl Pearce |

| 25 July 2017 Friendly | Colchester United | 0–1 | Ipswich Town | Colchester |
| 19:30 BST | | Report | Garner 57' | Stadium: Colchester Community Stadium; Attendance: 3,752 |

| 28 July 2017 Friendly | Colchester United | 1–2 | Gillingham | Colchester |
| 19:30 BST | Jackson 70' | Report | Martin 29'; Parker 54' | Stadium: Colchester Community Stadium; Referee: G Ward |

=== League Two ===
==== Results round by round ====
| Round | 1 | 2 | 3 | 4 | 5 | 6 | 7 | 8 | 9 | 10 | 11 | 12 | 13 | 14 | 15 | 16 | 17 | 18 | 19 | 20 | 21 | 22 | 23 | 24 | 25 | 26 | 27 | 28 | 29 | 30 | 31 | 32 | 33 | 34 | 35 | 36 | 37 | 38 | 39 | 40 | 41 | 42 | 43 | 44 | 45 | 46 |
|---|---|---|---|---|---|---|---|---|---|---|---|---|---|---|---|---|---|---|---|---|---|---|---|---|---|---|---|---|---|---|---|---|---|---|---|---|---|---|---|---|---|---|---|---|---|---|
| Ground | A | H | A | H | A | H | H | A | H | A | A | H | H | A | A | H | A | H | H | A | H | A | H | A | A | H | H | A | H | A | H | A | H | A | H | A | H | A | A | H | A | H | H | A | H | A |
| Result | L | D | L | W | L | W | D | L | L | D | W | W | L | W | D | W | W | D | W | L | W | W | D | W | D | D | L | L | D | D | W | D | W | L | L | D | L | D | W | W | W | L | L | L | D | L |
| Position | 21 | 20 | 23 | 16 | 20 | 14 | 16 | 17 | 20 | 21 | 16 | 15 | 16 | 14 | 15 | 13 | 10 | 12 | 9 | 11 | 10 | 5 | 8 | 5 | 8 | 8 | 9 | 11 | 11 | 11 | 10 | 11 | 10 | 11 | 12 | 13 | 13 | 13 | 11 | 11 | 10 | 11 | 11 | 11 | 12 | 13 |

Updated to match(es) played on 5 May 2018. Source:
A = Away; H = Home; W = Win; D = Draw; L = Loss

==== League table ====
| Pos | Team | Pld | W | D | L | GF | GA | GD | Pts |
|---|---|---|---|---|---|---|---|---|---|
| 11 | Newport County | 46 | 16 | 16 | 14 | 56 | 58 | −2 | 64 |
| 12 | Cambridge United | 46 | 17 | 13 | 16 | 56 | 60 | −4 | 64 |
| 13 | Colchester United | 46 | 16 | 14 | 16 | 53 | 52 | +1 | 62 |
| 14 | Crawley Town | 46 | 16 | 11 | 19 | 58 | 66 | −8 | 59 |
| 15 | Crewe Alexandra | 46 | 17 | 5 | 24 | 62 | 75 | −13 | 56 |

Source: BBC Sport
Rules for classification: 1) Points; 2) Goal difference; 3) Number of goals scored

==== Matches ====
On 21 June 2017, the league fixtures were announced.

| 5 August 2017 1 | Accrington Stanley | 3–1 | Colchester United | Accrington |
| 15:00 BST | Jackson 9'; Kee 32'; Beckles 64' | Report | Szmodics 81' | Stadium: Crown Ground; Attendance: 1,625; Referee: Ross Joyce |

| 12 August 2017 2 | Colchester United | 1–1 | Stevenage | Colchester |
| 15:00 BST | Mandron 65' | Report | Newton 51' | Stadium: Colchester Community Stadium; Attendance: 3,330; Referee: Antony Coggins |

| 19 August 2017 3 | Luton Town | 3–0 | Colchester United | Luton |
| 15:00 BST | Lee 45+3'; Collins 52'; Potts 83' | Report | | Stadium: Kenilworth Road; Attendance: 7,865; Referee: Seb Stockbridge |

| 26 August 2017 4 | Colchester United | 5–1 | Forest Green Rovers | Colchester |
| 15:00 BST | Reid 4'; Kent 21'; Szmodics 65'; Vincent-Young 74'; Senior 90+3' | Report | Noble 23' | Stadium: Colchester Community Stadium; Attendance: 3,047; Referee: Craig Hicks |

| 2 September 2017 5 | Cambridge United | 1–0 | Colchester United | Cambridge |
| 15:00 BST | Ikpeazu 64' | Report | | Stadium: Abbey Stadium; Attendance: 4,511; Referee: Nick Kinseley |

| 9 September 2017 6 | Colchester United | 3–1 | Crawley Town | Colchester |
| 15:00 BST | Szmodics 8'; Jackson 14'; Mandron 38' | Report | Smith 66' | Stadium: Colchester Community Stadium; Attendance: 2,923; Referee: Graham Horwood |

| 12 September 2017 7 | Colchester United | 1–1 | Chesterfield | Colchester |
| 19:45 BST | Hanlan 82' | Report | Reed 43' | Stadium: Colchester Community Stadium; Attendance: 2,552; Referee: Darren Handley |

| 16 September 2017 8 | Cheltenham Town | 3–1 | Colchester United | Cheltenham |
| 15:00 BST | Dawson 10', 15'; Grimes 57' | Report | Szmodics 26' (pen.); Mandron (red card) 56' | Stadium: Whaddon Road; Attendance: 2,718; Referee: Tom Nield |

| 23 September 2017 9 | Colchester United | 1–2 | Wycombe Wanderers | Colchester |
| 15:00 BST | Hanlan 43' | Report | Tyson 32'; Mackail-Smith 67' | Stadium: Colchester Community Stadium; Attendance: 3,562; Referee: Brett Huxtable |

| 26 September 2017 10 | Grimsby Town | 2–2 | Colchester United | Cleethorpes |
| 19:45 BST | Hooper 7'; Jones 89' (pen.) | Report | Reid 5', 59' | Stadium: Blundell Park; Attendance: 3,438; Referee: Darren Drysdale |

| 30 September 2017 11 | Yeovil Town | 0–1 | Colchester United | Yeovil |
| 15:00 BST | | Report | Murray 43' | Stadium: Huish Park; Attendance: 2,556; Referee: Antony Coggins |

| 7 October 2017 12 | Colchester United | 2–0 | Mansfield Town | Colchester |
| 15:00 BST | Murray 29'; Mandron 34' | Report | | Stadium: Colchester Community Stadium; Attendance: 3,262; Referee: John Busby |

| 14 October 2017 13 | Colchester United | 0–1 | Carlisle United | Colchester |
| 15:00 BST | | Report | Devitt 58' | Stadium: Colchester Community Stadium; Attendance: 3,402; Referee: Charles Breakspear |

| 17 October 2017 14 | Newport County | 1–2 | Colchester United | Newport |
| 19:45 BST | McCoulsky 86' | Report | Jackson 72'; Mandron 77' | Stadium: Rodney Parade; Attendance: 2,704; Referee: Darren England |

| 21 October 2017 15 | Coventry City | 0–0 | Colchester United | Coventry |
| 15:00 BST | | Report | Lapslie (yellow card) 75' (yellow-red card) 76' | Stadium: Ricoh Arena; Attendance: 7,149; Referee: Michael Salisbury |

| 28 October 2017 16 | Colchester United | 3–1 | Crewe Alexandra | Colchester |
| 15:00 BST | Mandron 39', 71'; Eastman 60' | Report | Bowery 22' | Stadium: Colchester Community Stadium; Attendance: 3,088; Referee: Kevin Johnson |

| 11 November 2017 17 | Barnet | 0–1 | Colchester United | Canons Park |
| 15:00 GMT | | Report | Szmodics 83' | Stadium: The Hive Stadium; Attendance: 2,301; Referee: John Brooks |

| 18 November 2017 18 | Colchester United | 0–0 | Morecambe | Colchester |
| 15:00 GMT | | Report | | Stadium: Colchester Community Stadium; Attendance: 2,872; Referee: Lee Collins |

| 21 November 2017 19 | Colchester United | 1–0 | Lincoln City | Colchester |
| 19:45 GMT | Szmodics 3' | Report | | Stadium: Colchester Community Stadium; Attendance: 3,102; Referee: Graham Horwood |

| 25 November 2017 20 | Notts County | 2–1 | Colchester United | Nottingham |
| 15:00 GMT | Ameobi 68' (pen.); Yates 90+3' | Report | Odelusi 89' | Stadium: Meadow Lane; Attendance: 6,770; Referee: Mark Heywood |

| 9 December 2017 21 | Colchester United | 3–1 | Exeter City | Colchester |
| 15:00 GMT | Archibald-Henville 23' (o.g.); Szmodics 26' (pen.), 30' | Report | Stockley 62' | Stadium: Colchester Community Stadium; Attendance: 3,049; Referee: Darren Drysdale |

| 15 December 2017 22 | Swindon Town | 2–3 | Colchester United | Swindon |
| 19:45 GMT | Woolery 36'; Gordon 76' | Report | Kent 45+1'; Mandron 63'; Szmodics 78' | Stadium: County Ground; Attendance: 6,020; Referee: John Busby |

| 23 December 2017 23 | Colchester United | 1–1 | Port Vale | Colchester |
| 15:00 GMT | Szmodics 32' | Report | Harness 75' | Stadium: Colchester Community Stadium; Attendance: 3,485; Referee: Nick Kinseley |

| 26 December 2017 24 | Crawley Town | 0–2 | Colchester United | Crawley |
| 15:00 GMT | | Report | Mandron 4'; Szmodics 57' | Stadium: Broadfield Stadium; Attendance: 2,154; Referee: Antony Coggins |

| 30 December 2017 25 | Chesterfield | 0–0 | Colchester United | Chesterfield |
| 15:00 GMT | | Report | | Stadium: Proact Stadium; Attendance: 5,537; Referee: Seb Stockbridge |

| 1 January 2018 26 | Colchester United | 0–0 | Cambridge United | Colchester |
| 15:00 GMT | | Report | | Stadium: Colchester Community Stadium; Attendance: 4,789; Referee: Charles Breakspear |

| 6 January 2018 27 | Colchester United | 1–4 | Cheltenham Town | Colchester |
| 15:00 GMT | Guthrie 40'; Reid (red card) 44' | Report | Odelusi 57'; Atangana 70'; Sellars 79'; Eisa 83' | Stadium: Colchester Community Stadium; Attendance: 2,886; Referee: Scott Oldham |

| 13 January 2018 28 | Wycombe Wanderers | 3–1 | Colchester United | High Wycombe |
| 15:00 GMT | Akinfenwa 14'; Cowan-Hall 24'; O'Nien 74' | Report | Szmodics 78' | Stadium: Adams Park; Attendance: 4,386; Referee: John Busby |

| 20 January 2018 29 | Colchester United | 1–1 | Grimsby Town | Colchester |
| 15:00 GMT | Murray 47' | Report | Vernam 38' | Stadium: Colchester Community Stadium; Attendance: 3,016; Referee: Craig Hicks |

| 27 January 2018 30 | Port Vale | 2–2 | Colchester United | Burslem |
| 15:00 GMT | Worrall 33', 87' | Report | Senior 12'; Wright 45+4' | Stadium: Vale Park; Attendance: 4,044; Referee: Trevor Kettle |

| 3 February 2018 31 | Colchester United | 2–0 | Newport County | Colchester |
| 15:00 GMT | Stevenson 59'; Eastman 80' | Report | | Stadium: Colchester Community Stadium; Attendance: 2,874; Referee: Gavin Ward |

| 10 February 2018 32 | Carlisle United | 1–1 | Colchester United | Carlisle |
| 15:00 GMT | Devitt 79' | Report | Senior 44' | Stadium: Brunton Park; Attendance: 4,006; Referee: Ross Joyce |

| 13 February 2018 33 | Colchester United | 2–1 | Coventry City | Colchester |
| 19:45 GMT | Ogedi-Uzokwe 27' (pen.); Mandron 88' | Report | Bayliss 56' | Stadium: Colchester Community Stadium; Attendance: 3,319; Referee: John Busby |

| 17 February 2018 34 | Crewe Alexandra | 1–0 | Colchester United | Crewe |
| 15:00 GMT | Miller 60' | Report | | Stadium: Gresty Road; Attendance: 3,548; Referee: Michael Salisbury |

| 24 February 2018 35 | Colchester United | 0–1 | Barnet | Colchester |
| 15:00 GMT | | Report | Nicholls 66' | Stadium: Colchester Community Stadium; Attendance: 3,121; Referee: Dean Whitestone |

| 10 March 2018 36 | Mansfield Town | 1–1 | Colchester United | Mansfield |
| 15:00 GMT | Hemmings 22' | Report | Comley 51' | Stadium: Field Mill; Attendance: 4,050; Referee: Ross Joyce |

| 17 March 2018 37 | Colchester United | 0–1 | Yeovil Town | Colchester |
| 15:00 GMT | | Report | Fisher 21' | Stadium: Colchester Community Stadium; Attendance: 2,772; Referee: Tom Nield |

| 20 March 2018 38 | Morecambe | 0–0 | Colchester United | Morecambe |
| 19:45 GMT | | Report | | Stadium: Globe Arena; Attendance: 893; Referee: Richard Clark |

| 24 March 2018 39 | Stevenage | 0–1 | Colchester United | Stevenage |
| 15:00 GMT | | Report | Mandron 27' | Stadium: Broadhall Way; Attendance: 2,709; Referee: Graham Salisbury |

| 30 March 2018 40 | Colchester United | 2–1 | Luton Town | Colchester |
| 15:00 GMT | Eastman 15'; Prosser 27' | Report | Hylton 88' (pen.) | Stadium: Colchester Community Stadium; Attendance: 5,461; Referee: Trevor Kettle |

| 2 April 2018 41 | Forest Green Rovers | 1–2 | Colchester United | Nailsworth |
| 15:00 GMT | Reid 37' (pen.) | Report | Dr. Wright 1'; Stevenson 47' | Stadium: The New Lawn; Attendance: 2,869; Referee: Brett Huxtable |

| 7 April 2018 42 | Colchester United | 0–1 | Accrington Stanley | Colchester |
| 15:00 GMT | | Report | Kee 63' | Stadium: Colchester Community Stadium; Attendance: 3,174; Referee: Kevin Johnson |

| 14 April 2018 43 | Colchester United | 1–3 | Notts County | Colchester |
| 15:00 GMT | Dr. Wright 9' | Report | Forte 51'; Ameobi 69'; Duffy 76' | Stadium: Colchester Community Stadium; Attendance: 3,599; Referee: Brendan Malone |

| 21 April 2018 44 | Lincoln City | 2–1 | Colchester United | Lincoln, England |
| 15:00 GMT | Whitehouse 55' (pen.); Waterfall 90+4'; Bostwick (red card) 83' | Report | Senior 60' | Stadium: Sincil Bank; Attendance: 9,211; Referee: Darren Handley |

| 28 April 2018 45 | Colchester United | 0–0 | Swindon Town | Colchester |
| 15:00 GMT | | Report | | Stadium: Colchester Community Stadium; Attendance: 3,687; Referee: Craig Hicks |

| 5 May 2018 46 | Exeter City | 1–0 | Colchester United | Exeter |
| 15:00 GMT | Simpson 71' | Report | | Stadium: St James Park; Attendance: 4,615; Referee: Charles Breakspear |

=== EFL Cup ===
On 16 June 2017, Colchester were drawn at home to Championship side Aston Villa in the first round of the EFL Cup. The match was chosen to be screened live on Sky Sports and would be played on 9 August.

| 9 August 2017 First round | Colchester United | 1–2 | Aston Villa | Colchester |
| 19:45 BST | Kent 39' | Report | Hogan 7'; Kent 19' (o.g.) | Stadium: Colchester Community Stadium; Attendance: 6,603; Referee: John Brooks |

=== EFL Trophy ===
On 7 July 2017, Colchester were drawn against Gillingham and Southend United as their first two opponents in the EFL Trophy group stage. Reading U23s were drawn as Colchester's final group opponents on 12 July.

| Pos | Lge | Team | Pld | W | PW | PL | L | GF | GA | GD | Pts | Qualification |
|---|---|---|---|---|---|---|---|---|---|---|---|---|
| 1 | L1 | Gillingham (Q) | 3 | 3 | 0 | 0 | 0 | 10 | 6 | +4 | 9 | Round 2 |
| 2 | L1 | Southend United (Q) | 3 | 2 | 0 | 0 | 1 | 4 | 2 | +2 | 6 | Round 2 |
| 3 | L2 | Colchester United (E) | 3 | 0 | 1 | 0 | 2 | 2 | 5 | −3 | 2 | |
| 4 | ACA | Reading U21 (E) | 3 | 0 | 0 | 1 | 2 | 7 | 10 | −3 | 1 | |

Updated to match(es) played on 7 November 2017. Source: EFL.com
(E) Eliminated; (Q) Qualified to the phase indicated

| 29 August 2017 Group stage | Colchester United | 2–2 (6–5 p) | Reading U23 | Colchester |
| 19:30 BST | Szmodics 5'; McKeown 87' | Report | Barrett 19'; House 42' | Stadium: Colchester Community Stadium; Attendance: 572 |
| | Penalties |
| | Kinsella (penalty scored); James (penalty scored); Mandron (penalty scored); Dr. Wright (penalty scored); O'Sullivan (penalty scored); Jackson (penalty scored) | | Andresson (penalty scored); Smith (penalty scored); Holsgrove (penalty scored); Holmes (penalty scored); Barrett (penalty scored); Rollinson (penalty missed) |

| 3 October 2017 Group stage | Colchester United | 0–1 | Gillingham | Colchester |
| 19:45 BST | | Report | Ehmer 90+1' | Stadium: Colchester Community Stadium; Attendance: 684 |

| 7 November 2017 Group stage | Southend United | 2–0 | Colchester United | Southend-on-Sea |
| 19:45 GMT | Wright 37'; Robinson 49' | Report | | Stadium: Roots Hall; Attendance: 2,781 |

=== FA Cup ===
On 16 October 2017, Colchester were drawn at home to National League South side Oxford City in the first round of the FA Cup in what would be the first-ever meeting between the two sides.

| 4 November 2017 First round | Colchester United | 0–1 | Oxford City | Colchester |
| 15:00 GMT | | Report | Paterson 46' | Stadium: Colchester Community Stadium; Attendance: 1,775; Referee: Alan Young |

== Squad statistics ==
=== Appearances and goals ===
As of 5 May 2018

| No. | Pos | Nat | Player | Total | | League Two | | FA Cup | | EFL Cup | | EFL Trophy | |
| No. | Pos | Nat | Player | Apps | Goals | Apps | Goals | Apps | Goals | Apps | Goals | Apps | Goals |
|---|---|---|---|---|---|---|---|---|---|---|---|---|---|
| 1 | GK | (England) ENG | Sam Walker | 47 | 0 | 44 | 0 | 1 | 0 | 1 | 0 | 1 | 0 |
| 2 | DF | (England) ENG | Ryan Jackson | 45 | 2 | 41+1 | 2 | 1 | 0 | 1 | 0 | 0+1 | 0 |
| 4 | MF | (England) ENG | Tom Lapslie | 31 | 0 | 27+2 | 0 | 0 | 0 | 1 | 0 | 1 | 0 |
| 5 | DF | (England) ENG | Luke Prosser | 16 | 1 | 14+2 | 1 | 0 | 0 | 0 | 0 | 0 | 0 |
| 6 | DF | (England) ENG | Frankie Kent | 41 | 3 | 37 | 2 | 1 | 0 | 1 | 1 | 2 | 0 |
| 7 | FW | (England) ENG | Drey Wright | 47 | 3 | 38+6 | 3 | 1 | 0 | 1 | 0 | 1 | 0 |
| 8 | MF | (England) ENG | Doug Loft | 13 | 0 | 10+2 | 0 | 1 | 0 | 0 | 0 | 0 | 0 |
| 9 | FW | (Scotland) SCO | Denny Johnstone | 3 | 0 | 1+1 | 0 | 0 | 0 | 0+1 | 0 | 0 | 0 |
| 10 | MF | (England) ENG | Sammie Szmodics | 40 | 13 | 29+8 | 12 | 0 | 0 | 1 | 0 | 1+1 | 1 |
| 11 | DF | (England) ENG | Brennan Dickenson | 7 | 0 | 4+3 | 0 | 0 | 0 | 0 | 0 | 0 | 0 |
| 14 | MF | (Montserrat) MSR | Brandon Comley | 40 | 1 | 31+7 | 1 | 1 | 0 | 0 | 0 | 1 | 0 |
| 15 | FW | (Republic of Ireland) IRL | Olamide Shodipo | 6 | 0 | 2+4 | 0 | 0 | 0 | 0 | 0 | 0 | 0 |
| 16 | MF | (Republic of Ireland) IRL | Sean Murray | 40 | 3 | 18+19 | 3 | 0 | 0 | 1 | 0 | 2 | 0 |
| 17 | MF | (England) ENG | Ben Stevenson | 13 | 2 | 10+3 | 2 | 0 | 0 | 0 | 0 | 0 | 0 |
| 18 | DF | (England) ENG | Tom Eastman | 45 | 3 | 41+1 | 3 | 1 | 0 | 0 | 0 | 2 | 0 |
| 19 | FW | (France) FRA | Mikael Mandron | 49 | 10 | 42+2 | 10 | 1 | 0 | 1 | 0 | 2+1 | 0 |
| 20 | FW | (England) ENG | Courtney Senior | 19 | 4 | 10+8 | 4 | 0 | 0 | 0 | 0 | 0+1 | 0 |
| 21 | FW | (England) ENG | Liam Mandeville | 7 | 0 | 1+6 | 0 | 0 | 0 | 0 | 0 | 0 | 0 |
| 22 | DF | (England) ENG | Kane Vincent-Young | 41 | 1 | 37+1 | 1 | 0 | 0 | 0 | 0 | 3 | 0 |
| 23 | MF | (Wales) WAL | Tommy O'Sullivan | 4 | 0 | 0+1 | 0 | 0+1 | 0 | 0 | 0 | 1+1 | 0 |
| 24 | MF | (Scotland) SCO | Craig Slater | 10 | 0 | 1+5 | 0 | 0+1 | 0 | 0+1 | 0 | 1+1 | 0 |
| 25 | GK | (England) ENG | Dillon Barnes | 2 | 0 | 2 | 0 | 0 | 0 | 0 | 0 | 0 | 0 |
| 26 | DF | (England) ENG | Ryan Inniss | 19 | 0 | 18 | 0 | 1 | 0 | 0 | 0 | 0 | 0 |
| 27 | FW | (Nigeria) NGR | Junior Ogedi-Uzokwe | 9 | 1 | 3+6 | 1 | 0 | 0 | 0 | 0 | 0 | 0 |
| 29 | GK | (Republic of Ireland) IRL | Rene Gilmartin | 2 | 0 | 0 | 0 | 0 | 0 | 0 | 0 | 2 | 0 |
| 31 | FW | (England) ENG | Tariq Issa | 3 | 0 | 0+2 | 0 | 0 | 0 | 0 | 0 | 1 | 0 |
| 32 | MF | (England) ENG | Diaz Wright | 1 | 0 | 0 | 0 | 0 | 0 | 0 | 0 | 1 | 0 |
| 35 | DF | (England) ENG | Cameron James | 11 | 0 | 3+4 | 0 | 0 | 0 | 1 | 0 | 3 | 0 |
| 36 | FW | (England) ENG | Ryan Gondoh | 2 | 0 | 1+1 | 0 | 0 | 0 | 0 | 0 | 0 | 0 |
| 42 | FW | (England) ENG | Eoin McKeown | 1 | 1 | 0 | 0 | 0 | 0 | 0 | 0 | 0+1 | 1 |
Players who appeared for Colchester who left during the season
| 3 | DF | (England) ENG | Lewis Kinsella | 14 | 0 | 4+5 | 0 | 0+1 | 0 | 0+1 | 0 | 3 | 0 |
| 12 | DF | (England) ENG | Cole Kpekawa | 8 | 0 | 4+2 | 0 | 0 | 0 | 1 | 0 | 1 | 0 |
| 15 | FW | (England) ENG | Nicke Kabamba | 10 | 0 | 3+5 | 0 | 0 | 0 | 0 | 0 | 1+1 | 0 |
| 17 | FW | (England) ENG | Kyel Reid | 19 | 3 | 13+4 | 3 | 1 | 0 | 1 | 0 | 0 | 0 |
| 21 | FW | (England) ENG | Brandon Hanlan | 20 | 2 | 10+8 | 2 | 1 | 0 | 0 | 0 | 0+1 | 0 |
| 27 | FW | (England) ENG | Sanmi Odelusi | 10 | 1 | 0+8 | 1 | 0 | 0 | 0 | 0 | 2 | 0 |
| 28 | FW | (England) ENG | Kurtis Guthrie | 13 | 1 | 7+5 | 1 | 0 | 0 | 0 | 0 | 1 | 0 |

=== Goalscorers ===
| Place | Number | Nation | Position | Name | League Two | FA Cup | EFL Cup | EFL Trophy | Total |
|---|---|---|---|---|---|---|---|---|---|
| 1 | 10 | (England) | AM | Sammie Szmodics | 12 | 0 | 0 | 1 | 13 |
| 2 | 19 | (France) | CF | Mikael Mandron | 10 | 0 | 0 | 0 | 10 |
| 3 | 20 | (England) | WG | Courtney Senior | 4 | 0 | 0 | 0 | 4 |
| 4 | 18 | (England) | CB | Tom Eastman | 3 | 0 | 0 | 0 | 3 |
| 4 | 6 | (England) | CB | Frankie Kent | 2 | 0 | 1 | 0 | 3 |
| 4 | 16 | (Republic of Ireland) | AM | Sean Murray | 3 | 0 | 0 | 0 | 3 |
| 4 | 17 | (England) | WG | Kyel Reid | 3 | 0 | 0 | 0 | 3 |
| 4 | 7 | (England) | WG | Drey Wright | 3 | 0 | 0 | 0 | 3 |
| 9 | 21 | (England) | FW | Brandon Hanlan | 2 | 0 | 0 | 0 | 2 |
| 9 | 2 | (England) | RB | Ryan Jackson | 2 | 0 | 0 | 0 | 2 |
| 9 | 17 | (England) | MF | Ben Stevenson | 2 | 0 | 0 | 0 | 2 |
| 12 | 14 | (Montserrat) | MF | Brandon Comley | 1 | 0 | 0 | 0 | 1 |
| 12 | 28 | (England) | CF | Kurtis Guthrie | 1 | 0 | 0 | 0 | 1 |
| 12 | 42 | (England) | CF | Eoin McKeown | 0 | 0 | 0 | 1 | 1 |
| 12 | 27 | (England) | FW | Sanmi Odelusi | 1 | 0 | 0 | 0 | 1 |
| 12 | 27 | (Nigeria) | FW | Junior Ogedi-Uzokwe | 1 | 0 | 0 | 0 | 1 |
| 12 | 5 | (England) | CB | Luke Prosser | 1 | 0 | 0 | 0 | 1 |
| 12 | 22 | (England) | LB/RB | Kane Vincent-Young | 1 | 0 | 0 | 0 | 1 |
| | | | | Own goals | 1 | 0 | 0 | 0 | 1 |
| | | | | TOTALS | 53 | 0 | 1 | 2 | 56 |

=== Disciplinary record ===
| Number | Nationality | Position | Player | League Two | | FA Cup | | EFL Cup | | EFL Trophy | | Total | |
| Number | Nationality | Position | Player | Yellow card | Red card | Yellow card | Red card | Yellow card | Red card | Yellow card | Red card | Yellow card | Red card |
|---|---|---|---|---|---|---|---|---|---|---|---|---|---|
| 19 | (France) | CF | Mikael Mandron | 10 | 1 | 0 | 0 | 0 | 0 | 0 | 0 | 10 | 1 |
| 6 | (England) | CB | Frankie Kent | 7 | 0 | 0 | 0 | 0 | 0 | 2 | 0 | 9 | 0 |
| 4 | (England) | CM | Tom Lapslie | 6 | 1 | 0 | 0 | 0 | 0 | 0 | 0 | 6 | 1 |
| 10 | (England) | AM | Sammie Szmodics | 6 | 0 | 0 | 0 | 1 | 0 | 0 | 0 | 7 | 0 |
| 22 | (England) | LB/RB | Kane Vincent-Young | 6 | 0 | 0 | 0 | 0 | 0 | 0 | 0 | 6 | 0 |
| 14 | (Montserrat) | MF | Brandon Comley | 4 | 0 | 0 | 0 | 0 | 0 | 0 | 0 | 4 | 0 |
| 18 | (England) | CB | Tom Eastman | 4 | 0 | 0 | 0 | 0 | 0 | 0 | 0 | 4 | 0 |
| 2 | (England) | RB | Ryan Jackson | 4 | 0 | 0 | 0 | 0 | 0 | 0 | 0 | 4 | 0 |
| 3 | (England) | LB | Lewis Kinsella | 4 | 0 | 0 | 0 | 0 | 0 | 0 | 0 | 4 | 0 |
| 17 | (England) | WG | Kyel Reid | 1 | 1 | 0 | 0 | 0 | 0 | 0 | 0 | 1 | 1 |
| 8 | (England) | MF | Doug Loft | 3 | 0 | 0 | 0 | 0 | 0 | 0 | 0 | 3 | 0 |
| 1 | (England) | GK | Sam Walker | 3 | 0 | 0 | 0 | 0 | 0 | 0 | 0 | 3 | 0 |
| 7 | (England) | WG | Drey Wright | 3 | 0 | 0 | 0 | 0 | 0 | 0 | 0 | 3 | 0 |
| 16 | (Republic of Ireland) | CM | Sean Murray | 1 | 0 | 0 | 0 | 1 | 0 | 0 | 0 | 2 | 0 |
| 36 | (England) | LW | Ryan Gondoh | 1 | 0 | 0 | 0 | 0 | 0 | 0 | 0 | 1 | 0 |
| 28 | (England) | CF | Kurtis Guthrie | 1 | 0 | 0 | 0 | 0 | 0 | 0 | 0 | 1 | 0 |
| 26 | (England) | CB | Ryan Inniss | 1 | 0 | 0 | 0 | 0 | 0 | 0 | 0 | 1 | 0 |
| 23 | (Wales) | CM | Tommy O'Sullivan | 0 | 0 | 0 | 0 | 0 | 0 | 1 | 0 | 1 | 0 |
| 5 | (England) | CB | Luke Prosser | 1 | 0 | 0 | 0 | 0 | 0 | 0 | 0 | 1 | 0 |
| | | | TOTALS | 63 | 3 | 0 | 0 | 2 | 0 | 3 | 0 | 68 | 3 |

=== Player debuts ===
Players making their first-team Colchester United debut in a fully competitive match.

| Number | Position | Player | Date | Opponent | Ground | Notes |
|---|---|---|---|---|---|---|
| 2 | RB | (England) Ryan Jackson | 5 August 2017 | Accrington Stanley | Crown Ground | |
| 19 | CF | (France) Mikael Mandron | 5 August 2017 | Accrington Stanley | Crown Ground | |
| 12 | LB | (England) Cole Kpekawa | 5 August 2017 | Accrington Stanley | Crown Ground | (Note: Second debut for the club.) |
| 17 | WG | (England) Kyel Reid | 9 August 2017 | Aston Villa | Colchester Community Stadium | |
| 20 | WG | (England) Courtney Senior | 26 August 2017 | Forest Green Rovers | Colchester Community Stadium | |
| 29 | GK | (Republic of Ireland) Rene Gilmartin | 29 August 2017 | Reading U23 | Colchester Community Stadium | |
| 42 | CF | (England) Eoin McKeown | 29 August 2017 | Reading U23 | Colchester Community Stadium | |
| 27 | FW | (England) Sanmi Odelusi | 2 September 2017 | Cambridge United | Abbey Stadium | |
| 14 | MF | (Montserrat) Brandon Comley | 9 September 2017 | Crawley Town | Colchester Community Stadium | |
| 15 | FW | (England) Nicke Kabamba | 9 September 2017 | Crawley Town | Colchester Community Stadium | |
| 26 | CB | (England) Ryan Inniss | 9 September 2017 | Crawley Town | Colchester Community Stadium | |
| 21 | FW | (England) Brandon Hanlan | 12 September 2017 | Chesterfield | Colchester Community Stadium | |
| 27 | FW | (Nigeria) Junior Ogedi-Uzokwe | 20 January 2018 | Grimsby Town | Colchester Community Stadium | |
| 14 | MF | (Montserrat) Brandon Comley | 27 January 2018 | Port Vale | Vale Park | |
| 17 | MF | (England) Ben Stevenson | 3 February 2018 | Newport County | Colchester Community Stadium | |
| 21 | FW | (England) Liam Mandeville | 10 February 2018 | Carlisle United | Brunton Park | |
| 15 | WG | (Republic of Ireland) Olamide Shodipo | 10 March 2018 | Mansfield Town | Field Mill | |
| 36 | LW | (England) Ryan Gondoh | 28 April 2018 | Swindon Town | Colchester Community Stadium | |

== Honours and awards ==
=== End-of-season awards ===
| Award | Player | Notes |
|---|---|---|
| Player of the Year award | (England) Tom Eastman | |
| Young Player of the Year award | (England) Kane Vincent-Young | |
| Player's Player of the Year award | (England) Sam Walker | |
| Goal of the Season award | (England) Kane Vincent-Young | |
| Community Player of the Year award | (England) Luke Prosser | |
| Colchester United Supporters Association Home Player of the Year award | (England) Tom Eastman | |
| Colchester United Supporters Association Away Player of the Year award | (England) Tom Eastman | |

== See also ==
- List of Colchester United F.C. seasons
