= Eoin McKeown =

English association football player

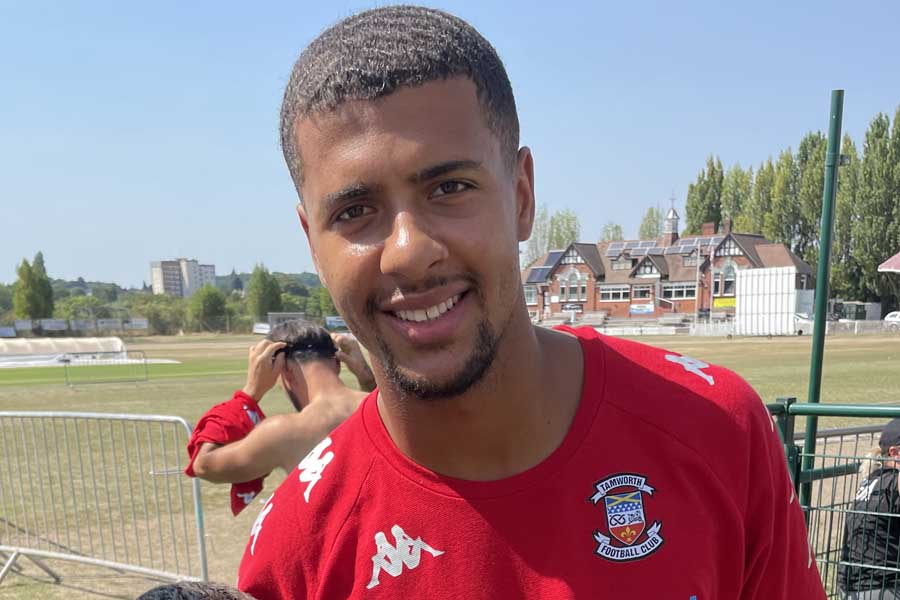
- McKeown in August 2022

Personal information
- Full name: Eoin Francis Okorie McKeown
- Date of birth: 5 November 1998 (age 28)
- Place of birth: Westminster, London, England
- Height: 1.90 m (6 ft 3 in)
- Position: Forward

Youth career
- –2015: Hoddesdon Town
- 2015–2017: Colchester United

Senior career*
Years	Team	Apps	(Gls)
2016–2019	Colchester United	0	(0)
2016–2017	→ Maldon & Tiptree (loan)	5	(1)
2018	→ Maldon & Tiptree (loan)	6	(3)
2018–2019	→ Wealdstone (loan)	9	(1)
2019	→ Welwyn Garden City (loan)	9	(5)
2019	Kings Langley	8	(3)
2019	Wingate & Finchley	4	(1)
2019–2020	Coggeshall Town	8	(0)
2020	Walton Casuals	2	(0)
2020	Coggeshall Town	1	(0)
2020	Loughborough University	4	(5)
2021–2022	Braintree Town	3	(0)
2022	→ Maldon & Tiptree (dual)	1	(0)
2022–2023	Tamworth	42	(19)
2023–2024	Buxton	31	(2)
2024–2025	Hemel Hempstead Town	10	(1)
- * Club domestic league appearances and goals as of 17:00, 17 August 2022 (UTC)

Eoin Francis Okorie McKeown (born 5 November 1998) is an English footballer who most recently played for National League South side Hemel Hempstead Town, where he played as a forward.

He joined the Colchester United Academy from Hoddesdon Town following at trial with the club in 2015. He joined Isthmian League Division One North side Maldon & Tiptree on a work experience loan in December 2016 before he made his professional debut for Colchester in the EFL Trophy in August 2017. He rejoined Maldon & Tiptree on loan in January 2018 and then joined Wealdstone in an emergency loan deal in December 2018. After a loan spell with Welwyn Garden City, McKeown was released by Colchester in summer 2019. He later joined Kings Langley and then Wingate & Finchley.

== Playing career ==
=== Colchester United ===
Born in Westminster, London, McKeown was playing for Hoddesdon Town when he was spotted by Colchester United scouts in 2015. Following a three-game trial with the Colchester United under-16 squad, he was offered a contract to join the club's Academy. He scored four goals against Queens Park Rangers under-18s in November 2015 during an 8–1 win.

In December 2016, Colchester under-23 assistant manager and Maldon & Tiptree manager Kevin Horlock signed McKeown on a work experience loan to the Isthmian League Division One North side. He made his debut on 10 December as an 86th-minute substitute against Cheshunt, helping set up the Jammers' fourth goal in a 4–1 victory. He scored his first goal on 21 January 2017 during a 2–0 win at home to Great Wakering Rovers. He made five league appearances for the club.

On 25 May 2017, McKeown signed a one-year professional development contract with Colchester.

McKeown made his Colchester debut on 29 August 2017 as a substitute for Tariq Issa against Reading U23 in the EFL Trophy. He scored in the 87th minute to level the score at 2–2 and take the match to a penalty shoot-out, which Colchester won 6–5.

He returned to Maldon & Tiptree on loan until the end of the season on 8 January 2018. He made his second club debut on 9 January in their 2–2 draw with Mildenhall Town. After almost three months out injured, he scored a hat-trick against Aveley in his third appearance of his loan spell on 14 April.

McKeown signed a new one-year contract with Colchester in May 2018.

In December 2018, McKeown joined National League South side Wealdstone in an emergency loan deal and made his debut in a 2–1 FA Trophy defeat to Biggleswade Town on 15 December. He scored his first goal for the club from the bench in the 92nd minute of Wealdstone's 1–1 draw with Dartford on 5 January 2019.

On 14 May 2019, it was announced McKeown was to leave Colchester United at the end of his contract.

=== Kings Langley ===
Since leaving Colchester, McKeown has played for Kings Langley and Wingate & Finchley.

=== Tamworth ===
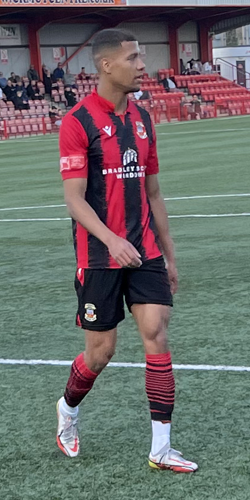
McKeown playing for Tamworth in March 2022

On 4 February 2022, McKeown signed for Southern League Premier Division Central side Tamworth, moving the player closer to Loughborough, where he resides. He made his debut on 5 February 2022 in an away Southern League Premier Division Central fixture against Stourbridge, with his new side being humbled 4–0.

McKeown was injured on his home debut for Tamworth on 12 February 2022 in a Southern League Premier Division Central match against Alvechurch, with McKeown being withdrawn on the 28th minute and replaced by Dexter Walters, the game finished 1–1.

McKeown returned to action on 15 March 2022, in an away Southern League Premier Division Central fixture against Leiston, coming on as a 65th minute substitute for Dexter Walters, the game also finished 1–1.

His first goal for Tamworth came on 26 March 2022, in a home Southern League Premier Division Central match against Needham Market, McKeown scored the opening goal in a 5–2 victory.

McKeown scored his second goal for Tamworth on 9 April 2022, in an away Southern League Premier Division Central fixture against lowly Lowestoft Town, netting on the 87th minute to give his team a share of the spoils with the match finishing 1–1.

McKeown bagged his first hattrick for Tamworth on 21 April 2022, in the penultimate Southern League Premier Division Central game of the season, in a rearranged home fixture against Biggleswade Town. McKeown scored the 13th, 31st and 45th minute to give the home side a 3–0 lead at the break. The match finished 3–1, with the result being enough to relegate Biggleswade Town.

McKeown remained with Tamworth for the 2022–23 season, scoring 14 goals in 31 appearances for the club as Tamworth went on to win the Southern League Premier Division Central title and subsequent promotion to the National League North, with Tamworth keen to hold onto their top performers, McKeown agreed to a new deal with the club initially, however on 2 June 2023, the club announced the players departure.

=== Buxton ===
The day prior, National League North side Buxton had announced the signing of McKeown.

=== Hemel Hempstead Town ===
On 4 July 2024, National League South side Hemel Hempstead Town confirmed that McKeown had signed for the club. The club confirmed on 7 August 2024, the McKeown had suffered an ankle ligament injury during a pre-season match against Wealdstone, and was due to be side lined for between 6-8 weeks.

McKeown made his long awaited debut for Hemel Hempstead Town on 8 February 2025, in a home fixture against Chippenham Town, he came on as an 88th minute substitute alongside Joe Iaciofano for Oli Lynch and Kai Brosnan, Eoin scored on his debut with a 90+3 minute strike, as Hemel Hempstead Town went on to win 4–2. McKeown completed the season making 10 appearances and scoring the one goal.

== Career statistics ==
As of end of 2024–25 season.

Appearances and goals by club, season and competition
Club	Season	League			FA Cup		League Cup		Other		Total	
Club	Season	Division	Apps	Goals	Apps	Goals	Apps	Goals	Apps	Goals	Apps	Goals
Colchester United	2016–17	League Two	0	0	0	0	0	0	0	0	0	0
Colchester United	2017–18	League Two	0	0	0	0	0	0	1 (Note: Appearance in EFL Trophy)	1	1	1
Colchester United	2018–19	League Two	0	0	0	0	0	0	0	0	0	0
Colchester United	Total		0	0	0	0	0	0	1	1	1	1
Maldon & Tiptree (loan)	2016–17	Isthmian League Division One North	5	1	0	0	–		0	0	5	1
Maldon & Tiptree (loan)	2017–18	Isthmian League North Division	6	3	–		–		0	0	6	3
Maldon & Tiptree (loan)	Total		11	4	0	0	–		0	0	11	4
Wealdstone (loan)	2018–19	National League South	9	1	0	0	–		1 (Note: Appearance(s) in FA Trophy)	0	10	1
Welwyn Garden City (loan)	2018–19	Southern League Division One Central	9	5	0	0	–		0	0	9	5
Kings Langley	2019–20	Southern League Premier Division South	8	3	1	1	–		1 (Note: Appearance in Southern League Cup)	0	10	4
Wingate & Finchley	2019–20	Isthmian League Premier Division	4	1	–		–		3 (Note: Appearance in Middlesex Senior Cup)	2	7	3
Coggeshall Town	2019–20	Isthmian League North Division	8	0	–		–		–		8	0
Walton Casuals	2019–20	Southern League Premier Division South	2	0	–		–		–		2	0
Coggeshall Town	2019–20	Isthmian League North Division	1	0	–		–		–		1	0
Loughborough University	2020–21	United Counties League Premier Division	4	5	1	0	–		1 (Note: Appearance in FA Vase)	0	6	5
Braintree Town	2021–22	National League South	3	0	–		–		–		3	0
Maldon & Tiptree (dual-reg.)	2021–22	Isthmian League North Division	1	0	–		–		–		1	0
Tamworth	2021–22	Southern League Premier Division Central	11	5	—		—		—		11	5
Tamworth	2022–23	Southern League Premier Division Central	31	14	1	2	—		3	0	35	16
Tamworth	Total		42	19	1	2	–		3	0	46	21
Buxton	2023–24	National League North	31	2	0	0	—		3	0	31	2
Hemel Hempstead Town	2024–25	National League South	10	1	0	0	—		2 (Note: Appearances in Hertfordshire Senior Cup)	(Note: Goals in Hertfordshire Senior Cup)2	12	3
Career total			143	36	3	3	0	0	12	5	158	44
