= Charley Edge =

Welsh footballer

Personal information
- Full name: Charley Joseph Edge
- Date of birth: 14 May 1997 (age 29)
- Place of birth: Aberystwyth, Wales
- Height: 1.75 m (5 ft 9 in)
- Position: Winger

Team information
- Current team: Brickfield Rangers

Youth career
- Swansea City
- –2013: Stoke City
- 2013–2015: Everton
- 2015–2016: Colchester United

Senior career*
| Years | Team | Apps | (Gls) |
| 2015–2018 | Colchester United | 1 | (0) |
| 2015–2016 | → Maldon & Tiptree (loan) | 8 | (5) |
| 2017 | → Leamington (loan) | 2 | (0) |
| 2018 | → Needham Market (loan) | 10 | (0) |
| 2018–2019 | Marine | 27 | (1) |
| 2019–2022 | Cefn Druids | 60 | (4) |
| 2022–2023 | Aberystwyth Town | 15 | (0) |
| 2023–2025 | Gresford Athletic | 51 | (16) |
| 2025–2026 | Newtown | 2 | (0) |
| 2026– | Brickfield Rangers | 9 | (0) |

International career^{‡}
- Wales U16
| 2014 | Wales U17 | 3 | (1) |
- * Club domestic league appearances and goals as of 08:52, 8 November 2026 (UTC) ‡ National team caps and goals as of 22:20, 1 September 2016 (UTC)

Charley Joseph Edge (born 14 May 1997) is a Welsh footballer who plays as a winger for Cymru North club Brickfield Rangers.

Edge joined the Colchester United Academy from Everton in 2015 after completing his two-year scholarship. He had previously been on the books of Swansea City and Stoke City. He has also represented Maldon & Tiptree on loan from Colchester, prior to making his professional debut in February 2017. He joined Leamington on loan in September 2017, and Needham Market in March 2018. He was released by Colchester at the end of the 2017–18 season.

== Club career ==
Born in Aberystwyth, Welsh youth international Edge was with Swansea City and Stoke City before moving to Everton for his scholarship in 2013. Joining in June 2013, he completed his two-year scholarship with Everton, before moving on to Colchester United's Academy in August 2015, where he signed a one-year professional development contract. He signed a one-year contract extension in May 2016.

Edge joined Isthmian League Division One North side Maldon & Tiptree for an initial one-month loan on 20 November 2015. He scored a brace on his debut in a 3–0 win against Soham Town Rangers on 21 November, going on to score five goals in eight league appearances.

On 14 February 2017, Edge made his professional debut for Colchester as an 84th-minute substitute in their 3–2 home defeat by Crawley Town.

On 3 July 2017, Edge signed a new one-year contract with Colchester United.

On 9 September 2017, Edge moved on loan to National League North side Leamington for one month. He made his debut the same day in Leamington's 0–0 draw at Darlington. He made two league appearances.

On 16 March 2018, Isthmian League Premier Division side Needham Market signed Edge on loan until the end of the season. He made his debut on 21 March in a 1–0 win at Leatherhead.

On 18 May 2018, Colchester announced Edge was one of seven under-23 players being released at the end of their contracts.

In the summer of 2025, he joined Newtown following spells at Marine, Cefn Druids, Aberystwyth Town and Gresford Athletic. Shortly after joining the club he broke his leg in the club's first season friendly. After an operation he returned to work but had another operation due to an infection, and faced a lengthy lay-off from playing. After missing the entire 2025–26 season he made his club debut as a second-half substitute in the club's first match of the 2026–27 season.

After two appearances for the club, in late August he joined Brickfield Rangers.

== International career ==
Edge has represented Wales at under-16 and under-17 levels. He scored for the under-17s in a 3–1 friendly win against Czech Republic in February 2014. He played in two games of the 2014 elite round qualification for the 2014 UEFA European Under-17 Championship in March 2014, where he played one minute against Switzerland in a 1–0 defeat, and 76-minutes of a 1–0 defeat to Spain two days later.

== Personal life ==
Edge attended The Marches School in Oswestry, where he grew up.

== Career statistics ==
As of 12 April 2025

Appearances and goals by club, season and competition
| Club | Season | League | | | National Cup (Note: Appearances in FA Cup and Welsh Cup) | | League Cup (Note: Appearances in League Cup and Welsh League Cup) | | Other | | Total | |
| Club | Season | Division | Apps | Goals | Apps | Goals | Apps | Goals | Apps | Goals | Apps | Goals |
|---|---|---|---|---|---|---|---|---|---|---|---|---|
| Colchester United | 2015–16 | League One | 0 | 0 | 0 | 0 | 0 | 0 | 0 | 0 | 0 | 0 |
| Colchester United | 2016–17 | League Two | 1 | 0 | 0 | 0 | 0 | 0 | 0 | 0 | 1 | 0 |
| Colchester United | 2017–18 | League Two | 0 | 0 | 0 | 0 | 0 | 0 | 0 | 0 | 0 | 0 |
| Colchester United | Total | | 1 | 0 | 0 | 0 | 0 | 0 | 0 | 0 | 1 | 0 |
| Maldon & Tiptree (loan) | 2015–16 | Isthmian League Division One North | 8 | 5 | 0 | 0 | – | | 0 | 0 | 8 | 5 |
| Leamington (loan) | 2017–18 | National League North | 2 | 0 | 0 | 0 | – | | 0 | 0 | 2 | 0 |
| Needham Market (loan) | 2017–18 | Isthmian League Premier Division | 10 | 0 | – | | – | | 0 | 0 | 10 | 0 |
| Marine | 2018-19 | Northern Premier League | 25 | 1 | 0 | 0 | 0 | 0 | 2 | 0 | 27 | 1 |
| Cefn Druids | 2019–20 | Cymru Premier | 14 | 1 | 1 | 0 | 0 | 0 | 0 | 0 | 15 | 1 |
| Cefn Druids | 2020–21 | Cymru Premier | 22 | 2 | 0 | 0 | 0 | 0 | 0 | 0 | 22 | 2 |
| Cefn Druids | 2021-22 | Cymru Premier | 24 | 2 | 2 | 0 | 0 | 0 | 0 | 0 | 26 | 2 |
| Cefn Druids | Total | | 60 | 5 | 3 | 0 | 0 | 0 | 0 | 0 | 63 | 5 |
| Aberystwyth Town | 2022–23 | Cymru Premier | 15 | 0 | 1 | 0 | 2 | 1 | 0 | 0 | 18 | 1 |
| Gresford Athletic | 2023–24 | Cymru North | 25 | 8 | 3 | 1 | 2 | 1 | 3 | 1 | 33 | 11 |
| Gresford Athletic | 2024–25 | Cymru North | 26 | 8 | 2 | 3 | 2 | 0 | 2 | 0 | 32 | 11 |
| Gresford Athletic | Total | | 51 | 16 | 5 | 4 | 4 | 1 | 5 | 1 | 65 | 22 |
| Career total | | | 170 | 27 | 9 | 4 | 6 | 2 | 5 | 1 | 192 | 34 |
