= Cole Kpekawa =

English footballer

Personal information
- Full name: Cole Desmond Kpekawa
- Date of birth: 20 May 1996 (age 30)
- Place of birth: Blackpool, England
- Height: 1.91 m (6 ft 3 in)
- Position: Centre back

Team information
- Current team: Sheppey United

Youth career
- Queens Park Rangers

Senior career*
Years	Team	Apps	(Gls)
2014–2016	Queens Park Rangers	6	(0)
2014–2015	→ Colchester United (loan)	4	(0)
2015	→ Portsmouth (loan)	2	(0)
2015–2016	→ Leyton Orient (loan)	9	(0)
2016–2017	Barnsley	7	(0)
2017–2018	Colchester United	6	(0)
2018–2019	St Mirren	4	(0)
2019	Billericay Town	7	(0)
2019–2020	AS Trenčín	1	(0)
2020–2021	Chelmsford City	11	(0)
2021–2022	Hemel Hempstead Town	37	(3)
2022–2023	Maidenhead United	25	(3)
2023–2024	Bromley	7	(0)
2023	→ Oxford City (loan)	4	(1)
2024	→ Kidderminster Harriers (loan)	6	(0)
2024–2025	Oxford City	11	(0)
2025	Bedford Town	14	(0)
2025–2026	Potters Bar Town	23	(0)
2026–	Sheppey United	0	(0)

International career
2015	England U20	4	(0)
- * Club domestic league appearances and goals as of 20:15, 5 May 2026 (UTC)

Cole Desmond Kpekawa (born 20 May 1996) is an English professional footballer who plays as a defender for Isthmian League South East Division club Sheppey United.

== Club career ==
=== Queens Park Rangers ===
Born in Blackpool, Kpekawa came through the Academy at Queens Park Rangers. He signed a two-year scholarship with the club in July 2012 at the age of 16. On 2 April 2014, he signed his first professional contract on a one-year deal.

Kpekawa joined League One side Colchester United for an initial one-month loan deal on 20 November 2014. He made his professional debut against Coventry City at the Colchester Community Stadium in a 1–0 League One defeat on 22 November. After making four appearances for Colchester, his loan was extended for a further month until 24 January 2015. He made six appearances for Colchester, four in League One and two in the FA Cup.

On 19 March 2015, he was loaned to League Two side Portsmouth until the end of the season. He made his debut on 21 March in a 1–0 defeat against AFC Wimbledon where he played the full 90-minutes. He was recalled from his loan at Portsmouth by QPR on 20 April having made two first-team appearances.

On returning to QPR, Kpekawa made his debut for the club as an 85th-minute substitute for Yun Suk-young in a 5–1 Premier League defeat to Leicester City on 24 May 2015.

On 19 November 2015, he joined League Two side Leyton Orient in an initial one-month loan deal. He made his debut two days later on 21 November as an early substitute in a 3–2 league win against York City. His loan was extended in December 2015, and again in January 2016 to remain with the O's until 1 March 2016. He was recalled from his loan by parent club QPR on 1 February 2016 after making nine appearances for Orient.

=== Barnsley ===
After struggling to hold down a first-team place at Queens Park Rangers, Championship rivals Barnsley signed Kpekawa for an undisclosed fee, thought to be in the region of £450,000, on 31 August 2016. He agreed a three-year contract with the club. He made his Barnsley debut on 10 September 2016 as a late substitute in their 2–1 win at Preston North End. However, after only four starts, Kpekawa found himself out of the first-team picture as manager Paul Heckingbottom preferred to play right-back Andy Yiadom out of position at left-back, while the club coaches worked with Kpekawa to suit a more central role.

=== Colchester United ===
Having made only seven league appearances for Barnsley, Kpekawa made a permanent return to his former loan club Colchester United on 17 July 2017. He signed an initial one-year deal for an undisclosed fee. He made his second Colchester United debut on 5 August as a substitute in their 3–1 defeat at Accrington Stanley.

After failing to establish himself in Colchester's first-team and having not made an appearance since January 2018, Kpekawa left the club by mutual consent on 13 April 2018.

=== St Mirren ===
On 13 July 2018, it was announced that Kpekawa had signed a two-year deal with St Mirren after a successful trial period with the Scottish Premiership side. Kpekawa made his debut for the club on the same day, starting in a 0–0 draw with Kilmarnock in the Scottish League Cup. After failing to break into the first team at Saints, he was released by mutual consent in January 2019.

=== AS Trenčín ===
On 20 August 2019, Kpekawa joined Fortuna Liga side AS Trenčín on a multi-year contract following a spell with Billericay Town.

Kpekawa made his Fortuna Liga debut against Zemplín Michalovce on 14 September 1019. In his debut match, Kpekawa was sent off in the 9th minute of the match, after he broke a leg of 18 year old Matej Trusa. Later that day, Trusa was diagnosed with a double fracture of his right leg. It was expected to take approximately 12 months until he recovers. Trusa, however, managed to return in 6 months. On 20 September 2019, Kpekawa was suspended for six months by the disciplinary committee of Slovak Football Association for his foul on Trusa.

=== Non-League ===
On 30 October 2020, Kpekawa signed for National League South club Chelmsford City.

On 2 June 2021, Chelmsford announced fellow National League South side Hemel Hempstead Town had signed Kpekawa.

On 27 May 2022, Kpekawa joined National League club Maidenhead United. He was released at the end of the season.

He joined Bromley for the 2023-24 season. In November 2023, he joined Oxford City on loan. In February 2024, he was loaned to Kidderminster Harriers until the end of the season. Following Bromley's promotion, Kpekawa departed the club at the end of the 2023–24 season.

In July 2024, Kpekawa returned to National League North side Oxford City on a permanent deal following a loan spell with the club the previous season.

In June 2025, Kpekawa joined newly promoted National League North side Bedford Town. He joined Isthmian League Premier Division side Potters Bar Town in December 2025.

On 5 May 2026, Kpekawa joined Isthmian League South East Division club Sheppey United.

== International career ==
Kpekawa was born in England and is of Sierra Leone descent. On 3 September 2015, following an injury to Kean Bryan of Manchester City, Kpekawa was called up to the England under-20 squad for their match against the Czech Republic. Two days later he made his international debut as the Czech Republic were defeated 5–0. He featured for the full 90-minutes.

He was again called up to the under-20 squad for the Mercedes-Benz Elite Cup in Germany, where England would play the Netherlands, Turkey and Germany. He started in England's 2–1 win against Turkey and featured as a substitute in their 1–0 defeat by Germany as England ended the competition as runners-up.

== Style of play ==
Kpekawa primarily plays as a left-back but can also operate as a centre-back. Barnsley manager Paul Heckingbottom described him as "tall, quick, strong, with a good left foot".

== Career statistics ==
As of match played 2 December 2023

Appearances and goals by club, season and competition
Club	Season	League			National cup		League cup		Other		Total	
Club	Season	Division	Apps	Goals	Apps	Goals	Apps	Goals	Apps	Goals	Apps	Goals
Queens Park Rangers	2014–15	Premier League	1	0	–		0	0	–		1	0
Queens Park Rangers	2015–16	Championship	5	0	0	0	2	0	–		7	0
Queens Park Rangers	2016–17	Championship	0	0	0	0	1	0	–		1	0
Queens Park Rangers	Total		6	0	0	0	3	0	0	0	9	0
Colchester United (loan)	2014–15	League One	4	0	2	0	0	0	0	0	6	0
Portsmouth (loan)	2014–15	League Two	2	0	–		0	0	0	0	2	0
Leyton Orient (loan)	2015–16	League Two	9	0	0	0	–		0	0	9	0
Barnsley	2016–17	Championship	7	0	0	0	–		0	0	7	0
Colchester United	2017–18	League Two	6	0	0	0	1	0	1 (Note: Appearance in EFL Trophy)	0	8	0
St Mirren	2018–19	Scottish Premiership	4	0	0	0	4	0	0	0	8	0
Billericay Town	2018–19	National League South	7	0	0	0	0	0	0	0	7	0
AS Trenčín	2019–20	Slovak Super Liga	1	0	0	0	0	0	0	0	1	0
Chelmsford City	2020–21	National League South	11	0	0	0	0	0	1 (Note: Appearance in FA Trophy)	0	12	0
Hemel Hempstead Town	2021–22	National League South	37	3	2	0	0	0	1	0	40	3
Maidenhead United	2022–23	National League	25	3	0	0	0	0	2	0	27	3
Bromley	2023–24	National League	6	0	1	0	0	0	0	0	7	0
Oxford City (loan)	2023–24	National League	4	1	0	0	0	0	0	0	4	1
Career total			129	7	5	0	8	0	5	0	147	7
