= Ryan Clampin =

English footballer

Personal information
- Full name: Ryan Clampin
- Date of birth: 29 January 1999 (age 27)
- Place of birth: Colchester, England
- Height: 5 ft 11 in (1.80 m)
- Positions: Left-back; left winger

Team information
- Current team: Braintree Town
- Number: 3

Youth career
- 2008–2017: Colchester United

Senior career*
| Years | Team | Apps | (Gls) |
| 2017–2023 | Colchester United | 51 | (1) |
| 2017–2018 | → Maldon & Tiptree (loan) | 33 | (9) |
| 2023 | → Dundee (loan) | 7 | (0) |
| 2023–2024 | Eastleigh | 16 | (0) |
| 2024–2026 | Braintree Town | 49 | (0) |
| 2026– | Braintree Town | 1 | (0) |
- * Club domestic league appearances and goals as of 16:18, 1 November 2026 (UTC)

Ryan Clampin (born 29 January 1999) is an English professional footballer who plays as a left back or left winger for National League South club Braintree Town.

Clampin began football at Colchester United, and had been with the Colchester United Academy since he was an under-9 player. He spent the 2017–18 season on loan at Maldon & Tiptree. He made his professional debut for Colchester in September 2018. Near the end of his time with Colchester, Clampin spent time on loan at Scottish side Dundee in 2023 and would win the Scottish Championship with them before returning to and being released by Colchester. Returning to England, Clampin spent one seasons with Eastleigh and two with Braintree Town.

== Career ==
Born in Colchester, Clampin is a left winger who joined Colchester United's Academy at the under-9 age group stage.

Clampin joined Isthmian League North Division side Maldon & Tiptree, initially on work experience loan from Colchester on 18 August 2017. He made his club debut on 26 August and scored in the 3–2 defeat to Hertford Town. He scored a first-half hat-trick on 26 September as the Jammers beat Brentwood Town 5–2. He scored ten goals in 41 appearances across the season for the club.

Clampin signed a new one-year contract with Colchester in May 2018.

On 4 September 2018, Clampin made his professional debut in the EFL Trophy as a substitute for Brennan Dickenson in Colchester's 2–0 defeat to Southampton Under-21s.

Clampin signed a new contract on 8 January 2019 to tie him to the club until summer 2021.

On 17 August 2019, Clampin made his full League Two debut in Colchester's 2–1 defeat by Cambridge United. He scored his first goal for Colchester in an EFL Trophy tie against Ipswich Town on 12 November 2019, the only goal of the game.

Clampin signed a new two-year contract with the club on 11 June 2021.

=== Dundee (loan) ===
On 27 January 2023, Clampin joined Scottish Championship club Dundee on loan until the end of the season. He would make his debut for the Dark Blues the following day as a substitute, and would notch an assist in a 3–0 win over league leaders Queen's Park. Clampin would win the Scottish Championship with Dundee at the end of the season. Clampin would depart Colchester at the end of the season.

=== Eastleigh ===
On 16 June 2023, Clampin joined National League side Eastleigh. He departed the club upon the expiration of his contract at the end of the 2023–24 season.

=== Braintree Town ===
In May 2024, Clampin joined newly promoted National League side Braintree Town. He made his debut in the league opener against Oldham Athletic.

On 31 October 2026, Clampin returned to Braintree Town in a player-coach role despite initially leaving the club following the conclusion of the 2025–26 season.

== Career statistics ==
As of match played 31 October 2026

Appearances and goals by club, season and competition
| Club | Season | League | | | FA Cup | | League Cup | | Other | | Total | |
| Club | Season | Division | Apps | Goals | Apps | Goals | Apps | Goals | Apps | Goals | Apps | Goals |
|---|---|---|---|---|---|---|---|---|---|---|---|---|
| Colchester United | 2017–18 | League Two | 0 | 0 | 0 | 0 | 0 | 0 | 0 | 0 | 0 | 0 |
| Colchester United | 2018–19 | League Two | 0 | 0 | 0 | 0 | 0 | 0 | 1 (Note: Appearance in EFL Trophy) | 0 | 1 | 0 |
| Colchester United | 2019–20 | League Two | 13 | 0 | 0 | 0 | 1 | 0 | 3 | 1 | 17 | 1 |
| Colchester United | 2020–21 | League Two | 21 | 1 | 0 | 0 | 0 | 0 | 1 | 0 | 22 | 1 |
| Colchester United | 2021–22 | League Two | 5 | 0 | 1 | 0 | 1 | 0 | 1 | 0 | 8 | 0 |
| Colchester United | 2022–23 | League Two | 12 | 0 | 1 | 0 | 2 | 0 | 3 | 0 | 18 | 0 |
| Colchester United | Total | | 51 | 1 | 2 | 0 | 4 | 0 | 9 | 1 | 66 | 2 |
| Maldon & Tiptree (loan) | 2017–18 | Isthmian League North Division | 33 | 9 | 2 | 0 | — | | 6 (Note: Appearances in Alan Turvey Trophy) (Note: Appearances in FA Trophy) (Note: Appearance in Essex Senior Cup) | 1 | 41 | 10 |
| Dundee (loan) | 2022–23 | Scottish Championship | 7 | 0 | — | | — | | 0 | 0 | 7 | 0 |
| Eastleigh | 2023–24 | National League | 16 | 0 | 2 | 0 | — | | 0 | 0 | 18 | 0 |
| Braintree Town | 2024–25 | National League | 35 | 0 | 1 | 0 | — | | 1 (Note: Appearances in FA Trophy) | 0 | 37 | 0 |
| Braintree Town | 2025–26 | National League | 14 | 0 | 0 | 0 | — | | 0 | 0 | 14 | 0 |
| Braintree Town | 2026–27 | National League South | 1 | 0 | 0 | 0 | — | | 0 | 0 | 1 | 0 |
| Total | | 50 | 0 | 1 | 0 | — | | 1 | 0 | 52 | 0 | |
| Career total | | | 157 | 10 | 7 | 0 | 4 | 0 | 16 | 2 | 184 | 12 |

== Honours ==
Dundee

- Scottish Championship: 2022–23
