= Tariq Issa =

English footballer (born 1997)

Personal information
- Full name: Tariq Ahmed Issa
- Date of birth: 2 September 1997 (age 29)
- Height: 1.70 m (5 ft 7 in)
- Position: Forward

Team information
- Current team: Kings Park Rangers

Youth career
- Trinity
- 2009–2016: Colchester United

Senior career*
Years	Team	Apps	(Gls)
2016–2020	Colchester United	2	(0)
2018–2019	→ Needham Market (loan)	13	(3)
2019	→ Maldon & Tiptree (loan)	4	(0)
2021	Needham Market	5	(0)
2021–2022	Coggeshall Town	20	(2)
2022	Stanway Pegasus	5	(2)
2023	Hullbridge Sports	14	(0)
2023	Stanway Pegasus	9	(1)
2023	Kings Park Rangers	1	(1)
- * Club domestic league appearances and goals as of 02:00, 24 December 2023 (UTC)

Tariq Ahmed Issa (born 2 September 1997) is an English footballer who last played as a forward for Kings Park Rangers.

Issa joined Colchester United's Academy at the age of 12 from Trinity Football Club based in Southend-on-Sea. He made his professional debut for the club in 2016. In August 2018, he joined Needham Market on loan. He also had a loan spell at Maldon & Tiptree in 2019. He was released by Colchester in July 2020. Issa rejoined Needham on a permanent basis in 2021.

== Career ==
Issa joined the Colchester United Academy at the age of 12 from Trinity Football Club in Southend-on-Sea. He broke into Colchester's under-18 side while still an under-16 player, and was the first Colchester Academy player to come through the educational system associated with Thurstable School in Tiptree. He and teammate Cameron James signed four-year contracts with the club in July 2015, before agreeing a new four-year deal in July 2016.

Issa made his first-team debut in the EFL Trophy on 4 October 2016, replacing Dion Sembie-Ferris at half-time in Colchester's 2–1 defeat to Southampton U23. He made his English Football League debut on 19 August 2017 as a substitute for Drey Wright in Colchester's 3–0 defeat against Luton Town.

On 30 August 2018, Issa signed for Southern League Premier Division Central side Needham Market on loan until January 2019. He made his debut on 1 September as a half-time substitute in Needham's 3–0 defeat at Alvechurch.

In August and September 2019, Issa made seven appearances on loan for Isthmian League North Division side Maldon & Tiptree. However, in October 2019 it was reported he had suffered a knee injury that would require surgery.

Issa was one of 16 players to be released by Colchester United in summer 2020.

In July 2021, Issa signed for Needham Market on a permanent basis.

In October 2021, Issa signed for Coggeshall Town.

In January 2023, following a spell at Stanway Pegasus, Issa signed for Hullbridge Sports.

Issa rejoined Stanway Pegasus for the 2023–24 season, before signing for Essex and Suffolk Border Football League Division One side Kings Park Rangers in December 2023.

== Career statistics ==
As of match played 7 September 2019

Appearances and goals by club, season and competition
Club	Season	League			FA Cup		League Cup		Other		Total	
Club	Season	Division	Apps	Goals	Apps	Goals	Apps	Goals	Apps	Goals	Apps	Goals
Colchester United	2016–17	League Two	0	0	0	0	0	0	1 (Note: Appearance in EFL Trophy)	0	1	0
Colchester United	2017–18	League Two	2	0	0	0	0	0	1	0	3	0
Colchester United	2018–19	League Two	0	0	–		0	0	0	0	0	0
Colchester United	2019–20	League Two	0	0	–		0	0	0	0	0	0
Colchester United	Total		2	0	0	0	0	0	2	0	4	0
Needham Market (loan)	2018–19	SL Premier Division Central	13	3	2	0	–		3 (Note: Appearance in Southern League Cup) (Note: Appearance in FA Trophy) (Note: Appearance in Suffolk Premier Cup)	0	18	3
Maldon & Tiptree (loan)	2019–20	Isthmian League North Division	4	0	2	0	–		1 (Note: Appearance in Alan Turvey Trophy)	0	7	0
Career total			19	3	4	0	0	0	6	0	29	3
