= Ryan Gondoh =

English footballer

Personal information
- Date of birth: 6 June 1997 (age 29)
- Place of birth: Sutton, London, England
- Height: 1.83 m (6 ft 0 in)
- Position: Winger

Team information
- Current team: Lewes

Youth career
- –2014: Whyteleafe
- 2014: Carshalton Athletic
- 2014–2015: Barnet

Senior career*
Years	Team	Apps	(Gls)
2014	Carshalton Athletic	2	(0)
2014–2016	Barnet	0	(0)
2015–2016	→ Hendon (loan)	5	(0)
2016	→ Staines Town (loan)	6	(1)
2016	Metropolitan Police	8	(0)
2016–2017	Kingstonian	8	(1)
2017	Carshalton Athletic	12	(2)
2017–2018	Maldon & Tiptree	21	(7)
2018–2019	Colchester United	6	(0)
2019	→ FC Halifax Town (loan)	4	(0)
2019	Carshalton Athletic	2	(0)
2019–2020	Concord Rangers	6	(0)
2020–2021	Whyteleafe	15	(8)
2020–2021	→ Hampton & Richmond Borough (loan)	9	(4)
2021	Wealdstone	14	(4)
2021	Hampton & Richmond Borough	15	(3)
2021–2022	Wealdstone	0	(0)
2022	Ayr United	6	(0)
2022	Sevenoaks Town	10	(3)
2022–2024	Lewes	49	(14)
2024–2026	AFC Whyteleafe	68	(35)
2026–	Lewes	5	(2)
- * Club domestic league appearances and goals as of 15:49, 18 September 2026 (BST)

Ryan Gondoh (born 6 June 1997) is an English professional footballer who plays as a winger for Isthmian League Premier Division club Lewes.

After a youth career in non-League football with Whyteleafe and briefly Carshalton Athletic, Gondoh signed a professional contract at Barnet where he made his professional debut in 2015. He had loan spells with Hendon and Staines Town being released by the club. He spent time with Metropolitan Police, Kingstonian and a second spell with Carshalton before joining Maldon & Tiptree. His performances with the Jammers earned him another professional contract at Colchester United in 2018. He joined FC Halifax Town on loan in March 2019. In the summer of 2019, Gondoh was released by Colchester and returned to non-league

== Career ==
Born in Sutton, London, Gondoh is a left winger who can also play at left-back. He was a member of the youth team at Whyteleafe, where he won the youth player of the year award for the 2013–14 season. Towards the end of 2013–14, he played twice for Carshalton Athletic in the Isthmian League Premier Division.

He joined Barnet for the 2014–15 season where he helped the under-18 side to the Football League Youth Alliance South East Conference title. He then signed a one-year professional contract with Barnet for 2015–16. He made his professional debut for the club on 1 September 2015 as a substitute for Shaun Batt during Barnet's 1–0 Football League Trophy defeat to Yeovil Town. He joined Isthmian League Premier Division side Hendon on loan in December 2015 where he made five league appearances. In February 2016, he was sent on loan to Hendon's league rivals Staines Town for one month alongside teammate Harry Taylor. He was released by Barnet at the end of the season.

In Summer 2016, Gondoh joined Isthmian League Premier Division side Metropolitan Police, where he made ten appearances, before joining league rivals Kingstonian in October 2016. He scored once in 10 games for the club. In early 2017, Gondoh returned to Carshalton. He signed for Isthmian League North Division side Maldon & Tiptree for the 2017–18 campaign, where he would make 29 appearances and scored 12 goals.

On 3 January 2018, he joined League Two side Colchester United on an 18-month contract alongside former Maldon & Tiptree teammate Junior Ogedi-Uzokwe. He made his English Football League debut on 28 April, coming on as a substitute for Drey Wright during Colchester's 0–0 draw with Swindon Town.

Gondoh signed for National League side FC Halifax Town on 16 March 2019 until the end of the season. He made his club debut on 23 March as a substitute in Halifax's 2–0 home win against Solihull Moors.

Gondoh was released by Colchester United at the end of his contract in summer 2019.

After briefly re-joining Carshalton at the start of the 2019–20 season, Gondoh signed for Concord Rangers on a permanent contract in October 2019. In January 2020 he re-joined Whyteleafe. He joined Hampton & Richmond Borough on dual registration on 10 November 2020 as the Isthmian League season was suspended due to coronavirus restrictions.

On 17 March 2021, Gondoh signed for Wealdstone. Gondoh scored his first goal for Wealdstone, and his first at National League level, against Bromley on 2 April 2021, in a 2–2 draw. He scored a brace in Wealdstone's final day 4-2 win over Woking, taking his goal tally up to 4 for the season.

On 1 June 2021, it was announced that Gondoh had agreed a move to Hampton & Richmond Borough for the 2021–22 season. Gondoh made a total of 17 appearances for the Beavers, scoring three times.

On 31 December 2021, Gondoh re-signed for Wealdstone He would remain there for just two weeks however, and would move to Scottish Championship side Ayr United on a two-year deal, becoming new manager Lee Bullen's first signing. He made 7 appearances for the club before departing at the end of the season.

Gondoh had a brief spell with Sevenoaks Town, before signing for Isthmian League Premier Division side Lewes in December 2022.

In May 2024, Gondoh joined Combined Counties Football League Premier Division South side AFC Whyteleafe, the phoenix club of his former side Whyteleafe FC. He was part of the side that won the 2024–25 Combined Counties League Premier Division South and reached the 2025 FA Vase final, playing the full 120 minutes as Whyteleafe lost 2–1 after extra-time to Whitstable Town.

In August 2026, Gondoh returned to Isthmian League Premier Division club Lewes.

== Personal life ==
Gondoh was a promising athlete in his youth. As an under-13, he was seventh in his age group for the 75m hurdles, and 28th for the 60 metres.

In May 2021 Gondoh had entered into an altercation with a homeless woman where Gondoh was called a racial epithet, in response Gondoh filmed himself kicking over her cup of change and throwing water in her face.

Gondoh and his teammates subsequently received racist messages, some containing death threats. Wealdstone FC stated that "We are fully supporting Ryan and everyone else at the club who has been abused" and refused to comment further on the matter.

== Career statistics ==
As of match played 22 August 2026

Appearances and goals by club, season and competition
Club	Season	League			FA Cup		League Cup		Other		Total	
Club	Season	Division	Apps	Goals	Apps	Goals	Apps	Goals	Apps	Goals	Apps	Goals
Carshalton Athletic	2013–14	Isthmian League Premier Division	2	0	0	0	–		0	0	2	0
Barnet	2014–15	Conference Premier	0	0	0	0	–		0	0	0	0
Barnet	2015–16	League Two	0	0	0	0	0	0	2 (Note: Appearance in Football League Trophy) (Note: Appearances in Middlesex Senior Cup)	0	2	0
Barnet	Total		0	0	0	0	0	0	2	0	2	0
Hendon (loan)	2015–16	Isthmian League Premier Division	5	0	0	0	–		0	0	5	0
Staines Town (loan)	2015–16	Isthmian League Premier Division	6	1	0	0	–		0	0	6	1
Metropolitan Police	2016–17	Isthmian League Premier Division	8	0	1	0	–		1 (Note: Appearance(s) in Alan Turvey Trophy)	0	10	0
Kingstonian	2016–17	Isthmian League Premier Division	8	1	–		–		2 (Note: Appearances in Surrey Senior Cup)	0	10	1
Carshalton Athletic	2016–17	Isthmian League Division One South	12	2	0	0	–		0	0	12	2
Maldon & Tiptree	2017–18	Isthmian League Division One North	21	7	2	2	–		6 (Note: Appearances in FA Trophy) (Note: Appearance in Essex Senior Cup)	3	29	12
Colchester United	2017–18	League Two	2	0	–		–		0	0	2	0
Colchester United	2018–19	League Two	4	0	0	0	0	0	2 (Note: Appearances in EFL Trophy)	0	6	0
Colchester United	Total		6	0	0	0	0	0	2	0	8	0
FC Halifax Town (loan)	2018–19	National League	4	0	–		–		0	0	4	0
Carshalton Athletic	2019–20	Isthmian League Premier Division	2	0	0	0	–		0	0	2	0
Concord Rangers	2019–20	National League South	6	0	0	0	–		2	0	8	0
Whyteleafe	2019–20	Isthmian League South East Division	9	5	0	0	–		1	0	10	5
Whyteleafe	2020–21	Isthmian League South East Division	6	3	4	5	–		1	0	11	8
Whyteleafe	Total		15	8	4	5	0	0	2	0	21	13
Hampton & Richmond Borough (loan)	2020–21	National League South	9	4	0	0	–		0	0	9	4
Wealdstone	2020–21	National League	14	4	0	0	–		0	0	14	4
Hampton & Richmond Borough	2021–22	National League South	15	3	1	0	–		1	0	17	3
Wealdstone	2021–22	National League	0	0	0	0	–		0	0	0	0
Ayr United	2021–22	Scottish Championship	6	0	1	0	0	0	0	0	7	0
Sevenoaks Town	2022–23	Isthmian League South East Division	10	3	7	3	—		4 (Note: Three appearances in FA Trophy and one in Alan Turvey Trophy)	3	21	9
Lewes	2022–23	Isthmian League Premier Division	22	8	0	0	–		0	0	22	8
Lewes	2023–24	Isthmian League Premier Division	27	6	0	0	–		0	0	27	6
Lewes	Total		49	14	0	0	0	0	0	0	49	14
AFC Whyteleafe	2024–25	Combined Counties Premier Division South	29	19	1	0	–		9 (Note: Includes FA Vase, Surrey Senior Cup and Combined Counties League Premier Challenge Cup)	1	39	20
AFC Whyteleafe	2025–26	Isthmian League South East Division	36	15	3	1	–		8 (Note: Includes FA Trophy, Surrey Senior Cup, Alan Turvey Trophy and Isthmian League playoffs)	2	47	18
AFC Whyteleafe	2026–27	Isthmian League Premier Division	3	1	0	0	—		0	0	3	1
AFC Whyteleafe	Total		68	35	4	1	0	0	17	2	89	39
Career total			266	82	20	11	0	0	39	9	325	102
