= Diaz Wright =

English footballer

Personal information
- Full name: Diaz Ray Wright
- Date of birth: 22 February 1998 (age 28)
- Place of birth: Greenwich, London, England
- Height: 5 ft 10 in (1.77 m)
- Position: Midfielder

Youth career
- 2011–2016: Colchester United

Senior career*
Years	Team	Apps	(Gls)
2016–2021	Colchester United	9	(0)
2017	→ Needham Market (loan)	7	(1)
2018	→ Braintree Town (loan)	10	(0)
2019–2020	→ Dagenham & Redbridge (loan)	2	(0)
2020	→ Welling United (loan)	10	(1)
- * Club domestic league appearances and goals as of 20:43, 11 August 2020 (BST)

Diaz Ray Wright (born 22 February 1998) is an English professional footballer who plays as a midfielder, most recently for EFL League Two club Colchester United.

The son of former Ipswich Town and Southampton midfielder Jermaine Wright and brother to Drey Wright, Wright has progressed through the Academy since joining the club at under-13 level, before making his debut in August 2016. He joined Needham Market on loan in October 2017, and Braintree Town on loan in March 2018, helping the club to promotion through the National League South play-offs in May 2018. He joined Dagenham & Redbridge on loan in December 2019 and Welling United in January 2020. Wright was released by Colchester in May 2021.

== Career ==
Born in Greenwich, London, Wright is the son of former Ipswich Town and Southampton midfielder Jermaine Wright and brother to Drey Wright. Wright joined Colchester United's Academy at under-13 level and has progressed through the age groups. He signed a one-year professional development contract with Colchester in June 2016. He was named on the first-team bench for the first time on 30 August 2016 for Colchester's EFL Trophy trip to Crawley Town. He made his debut in the game, replacing Tom Lapslie after 62-minutes of the 1–0 defeat.

On 3 July 2017, Wright signed a new one-year contract with Colchester United.

Wright joined Isthmian League Premier Division side Needham Market on loan on 16 October 2017, initially signing until the end of November. He made his debut on 17 October in a 1–0 defeat at Hendon, before scoring his first goal on 11 November in a 3–1 FA Trophy qualifying round defeat to Brentwood Town.

In March 2018, Wright joined National League South side Braintree Town on loan for one month. After making his debut in a 2–2 draw with Wealdstone, Braintree manager Brad Quinton praised Wright's maturity and hoped that the team could hold on to him until the end of the season. He helped the club to promotion in the National League play-offs in May 2018 as he scored the winning goal in a penalty shoot-out against Hampton & Richmond Borough.

Wright signed a new one-year contract with Colchester in May 2018.

On 1 September 2018, Wright made his English Football League debut and his first appearance of the season for Colchester when he appeared as a substitute for Brandon Comley in their 3–1 League Two win against Cheltenham Town.

Wright joined National League side Dagenham & Redbridge in December 2019, initially until 6 January 2020. He made his debut in Dagenham's extra time win over Sutton United in the FA Trophy, playing the full 120 minutes.

After his Dagenham loan, Wright joined Welling United alongside Colchester teammate Cameron James on loan for one month on 10 January 2020. He made his debut the next day in a 1–0 defeat to Wealdstone. He scored his first goal for the club in a 3–2 victory against Hungerford Town on 18 January. His loan was extended for a further month on 4 March.

After making only 14 first team appearances for Colchester in five years, with his last in March 2019, Wright was released by the club in May 2021.

== Career statistics ==
As of match played 14 March 2020

Appearances and goals by club, season and competition
Club	Season	League			FA Cup		League Cup		Other		Total	
Club	Season	Division	Apps	Goals	Apps	Goals	Apps	Goals	Apps	Goals	Apps	Goals
Colchester United	2016–17	League Two	0	0	0	0	0	0	1 (Note: Appearance(s) in EFL Trophy)	0	1	0
Colchester United	2017–18	League Two	0	0	0	0	0	0	1	0	1	0
Colchester United	2018–19	League Two	9	0	0	0	0	0	3	0	12	0
Colchester United	2019–20	League Two	0	0	0	0	0	0	0	0	0	0
Colchester United	2020–21	League Two	0	0	0	0	0	0	0	0	0	0
Colchester United	Total		9	0	0	0	0	0	5	0	14	0
Needham Market (loan)	2017–18	Isthmian League Premier Division	7	1	0	0	0	0	3 (Note: Appearance(s) in FA Trophy) (Note: Appearance in Suffolk Premier Cup)	1	10	2
Braintree Town (loan)	2017–18	National League South	10	0	–		–		3 (Note: Appearances in National League South play-offs)	0	13	0
Dagenham & Redbridge (loan)	2019–20	National League	2	0	–		–		1	0	3	0
Welling United (loan)	2019–20	National League South	10	1	–		–		0	0	10	1
Career total			38	2	0	0	0	0	12	1	50	3

== Honours ==
Braintree Town

- National League South play-offs: 2017–18
