= Dion Sembie-Ferris =

English footballer (born 1996)

Personal information
- Full name: Dion Leonard Sembie-Ferris
- Date of birth: 23 May 1996 (age 30)
- Place of birth: Peterborough, England
- Height: 1.73 m (5 ft 8 in)
- Position: Winger

Team information
- Current team: Spalding United

Youth career
- 2005–2008: Peterborough United
- 2008–: Netherton Vultures
- –2013: Tresham Academy
- 2013: St Neots Town
- 2013–2015: Colchester United

Senior career*
Years	Team	Apps	(Gls)
2013	St Neots Town	4	(0)
2013–2017	Colchester United	25	(0)
2016	→ Margate (loan)	5	(0)
2016–2017	→ Concord Rangers (loan)	20	(4)
2017–2018	St Neots Town	57	(9)
2018–2023	Peterborough Sports	56	(39)
2023–2024	Scunthorpe United	33	(4)
2023–2024	→ Peterborough Sports (loan)	13	(4)
2024–	Peterborough Sports	14	(4)
2024–	Spalding United	0	(0)
- * Club domestic league appearances and goals as of 19:51, 8 November 2024 (UTC)

Dion Leonard Sembie-Ferris (born 23 May 1996) is an English semi-professional footballer who plays as a winger for National League North club Spalding United.

Sembie-Ferris began his footballing career with Peterborough United at the age of nine, but was released in 2008, moving to Peterborough Junior Alliance side Netherton Vultures. He later joined St Neots Town, where he broke into the first-team at the age of 17. After impressing Colchester United scouts, he made a move to the League One club's Academy in November 2013. He made his professional debut for Colchester in January 2015, and later had a loan spells with National League South sides Margate and Concord Rangers. He was released by Colchester in August 2017 and made a return to St Neots the same month.

== Career ==
=== Early career ===
Born in Peterborough, Sembie-Ferris attended Leighton Primary School then Bushfield School in his hometown, while on the books at Peterborough United between the ages of nine and twelve. He was released by Peterborough in 2008, joining Netherton United junior side Netherton Vultures in the Peterborough Junior Alliance. Sembie-Ferris was a member of the under-14s side that won the 2010 ET Sports 'Team of the Year' award. He continued his football education at the Tresham Academy, where he helped the under-21 team to the Central Conference reserve league title in 2013.

After graduating from the Academy, Sembie-Ferris joined Southern League Premier Division side St Neots Town to continue his development. During his brief stay with the club, he had a trial with West Ham United, and made his debut for St Neots in the Huntingdonshire Senior Cup final on 3 May 2013, a game which his side won against Huntingdon Town after a penalty shoot-out. He made four appearances in the Southern League during the early stages of the 2013–14 season.

=== Colchester United ===
After a six-week trial with League One side Colchester United's Academy, Sembie-Ferris was offered a contract until the end of the 2013–14 season with a view to earning a Professional Development contract after impressing academy manager Tony Humes. During his first season with Colchester, Sembie-Ferris helped the Colchester under-18 side to a Youth Alliance South East league title and Youth Alliance Cup double, playing 78 minutes in the final on 29 April 2014, as the U's beat Bradford City 4–2 at Valley Parade.

==== 2014–15 season ====
Now first-team manager, Tony Humes had been impressed by Sembie-Ferris' performances at under-21 level. Humes selected Sembie-Ferris to travel with the first-team for Colchester's League One game against Crewe Alexandra on 27 September, although he was an unused substitute.

Sembie-Ferris made his first-team debut for Colchester on 2 January 2015, coming on as an 85th-minute substitute for Elliott Hewitt in their 3–1 FA Cup third round defeat to Cardiff City at the Cardiff City Stadium. Following his debut, Sembie-Ferris set his sights on making a league debut, saying that it was a "great feeling" to make his professional bow, and that his aim was to "get an appearance in the league and hopefully push on from there". The fixture that followed Colchester's FA Cup tie was a league match at his former and hometown club, Peterborough United, on 10 January. Sembie-Ferris stated that he was "desperate to play at London Road". Despite missing the 2–0 win, Sembie-Ferris made his league and home debut in the following game, again replacing Elliott Hewitt after 79 minutes of Colchester's 2–0 defeat to Walsall on 17 January. He made his first start for the club in their 2–0 home win over Yeovil Town on 17 March, playing 71 minutes before being substituted for Gavin Massey.

Utilised mainly as a late substitute by Tony Humes, Sembie-Ferris put this to good effect on 25 April in Colchester's game away to Fleetwood Town. He came off the bench in the 73rd minute to replace Alex Gilbey, and won his side a penalty in the 87th minute, which was duly converted by Chris Porter to win the game 3–2 and turn around a 2–1 deficit. Humes praised Sembie-Ferris' impact, hailing him as an "exciting prospect". After ending the season with eleven appearances in all competitions in the 2014–15 season, Sembie-Ferris signed a new three-year contract with Colchester on 15 May 2015.

==== 2015–16 season and Margate loan ====
After making a handful of appearances for Colchester in the early stages of the 2015–16 season and none since new manager Kevin Keen arrived in December 2015, Sembie-Ferris was allowed to leave the club on loan. He joined National League South side Margate on 24 March 2016 until the end of the season. He made his debut in Margate's 4–1 defeat at Wealdstone on 26 March, playing the full 90-minutes. He went on to make five appearances for the club.

He made ten first-team appearances for Colchester over the course of the campaign.

==== 2016–17 season and Concord Rangers loan ====
Sembie-Ferris scored his first goal for Colchester on 4 October 2016 in their 2–1 EFL Trophy defeat to Southampton U23 at the Colchester Community Stadium.

In December 2016, Sembie-Ferris was again allowed to leave the club on loan, joining National League South side Concord Rangers for one month. He made his debut as a substitute on 26 December in Concord's 1–1 home draw with East Thurrock United. He scored twice against St Albans City on 28 January 2017, his second a 91st-minute winner with Concord recording a 3–2 victory. On 24 February, Sembie-Ferris' loan at Concord was extended until the end of the season. He made 20 appearances for the Beach Boys during his loan spell scoring four goals.

He scored one goal in ten first-team appearances for Colchester across the campaign. He was released from his contract by mutual consent in August 2017.

=== Return to St Neots Town ===
In August 2017, Sembie-Ferris made a return to his former club St Neots Town, saying that he had "unfinished business" at the club.

=== Peterborough Sports ===
Following financial issues at St Neots Town, Dion signed for Southern League Division One Central side Peterborough Sports in November 2018.

=== Scunthorpe United ===
On 2 February 2023, Sembie-Ferris was announced as a new signing for Scunthorpe United. On 28 October 2023, Sembie-Ferris returned to former club Peterborough Sports on a loan till the end of the season.

Dion was released by Scunthorpe at the end of the 2023–24 season.

=== Spalding United ===
On 5 November 2024, Sembie-Ferris joined Southern League Premier Division Central side Spalding United for an undisclosed fee.

== Career statistics ==
As of match played 29 April 2017

Appearances and goals by club, season and competition
Club	Season	League			FA Cup		League Cup		Other		Total	
Club	Season	Division	Apps	Goals	Apps	Goals	Apps	Goals	Apps	Goals	Apps	Goals
St Neots Town	2013–14	Southern League; Premier Division	4	0	0	0	—		—		4	0
Colchester United	2013–14	League One	0	0	0	0	0	0	0	0	0	0
Colchester United	2014–15	League One	10	0	1	0	0	0	0	0	11	0
Colchester United	2015–16	League One	8	0	0	0	1	0	1 (Note: Appearance in Football League Trophy)	0	10	0
Colchester United	2016–17	League Two	7	0	0	0	0	0	2 (Note: Appearances in EFL Trophy)	1	9	1
Colchester United	2017–18	League Two	0	0	0	0	0	0	0	0	0	0
Colchester United	Total		25	0	1	0	1	0	3	1	30	1
Margate (loan)	2015–16	National League South	5	0	—		—		0	0	5	0
Concord Rangers (loan)	2016–17	National League South	20	4	—		—		—		20	4
Peterborough Sports	2022–23	National League North	27	6	1	0	—		2 (Note: Appearance(s) in FA Trophy)	0	30	6
Scunthorpe United	2022–23	National League	9	0	—		—		—		9	0
Scunthorpe United	2023–24	National League North	23	4	0	0	—		1 (Note: Appearance in National League North play-offs)	0	24	4
Scunthorpe United	Total		32	4	0	0	—		1	0	33	4
Peterborough Sports (loan)	2023–24	National League North	13	4	—		—		3	0	16	4
Peterborough Sports	2024–25	National League North	3	1	0	0	—		0	0	3	1
Career total			129	19	2	0	1	0	9	1	141	20

== Honours ==
St Neots Town

- 2012–13 Huntingdonshire Senior Cup winner

Colchester United U18

- 2013–14 Football League Youth Alliance South East winner
- 2013–14 Football League Youth Alliance Cup winner
