= Colchester United F.C. Under-23s and Academy =

- Full name: Colchester United Football Club Under-23s and Academy
- Nickname: The U's
- Ground: Florence Park, Tiptree; Colchester Community Stadium
- Capacity: 10,105 (Colchester Community Stadium)
- Chairman: Robbie Cowling
- Lead coach: Richard Hall (under-23s); Liam Bailey (under-18s)
- League: Professional U23 Development League League 2 South Division (under-23s); Professional U18 Development League League 2 South Division (under-18s)
- 2020–21: Professional U23 Development League 2 South Division, 9th (under-23s); Professional U18 Development League League 2 South Division, 7th (under-18s)
Home colours	Away colours	Third colours

Colchester United Football Club Under-23s are the under-23 team of Colchester United Football Club. They play in the South Division of the Professional U21 Development League 2, the second tier of reserve football in England. The team mostly consists of the club's under-23 players, although senior players have occasionally made appearances for the side, for instance, during recovery from injury. The team are coached by Richard Hall.

Colchester United Football Club Academy are the youth team of Colchester United Football Club. They play in the South Division of the Professional U18 Development League 2, the second tier of youth football in England. The team are coached by Liam Bailey.

The under-23 team play their home games at either the Colchester Community Stadium or the club's training ground, Florence Park in Tiptree. The under-18's also use Florence Park for their home matches.

== History ==
Under Colchester United chairman Robbie Cowling's stewardship, the club put forward a planning application for a nine-hectare site for a new training ground based in the nearby village of Tiptree in 2009. Planning permission was granted in 2010 for the centre which cost £3.5 million. It was built to house a new academy and provide training facilities for all teams within the club.

Under the new Elite Player Performance Plan development scheme, Colchester United were first granted Category Two status for their academy in July 2012. The new system allowed greater contact time between the young players within the academy and the club's coaching staff. However, in August 2013, the club fell short of the required standard set by the EPPP by three percent, but the club secured Category Two status once more in June 2014 after operating with an increased academy budget during the 2013–14 season. During the 2013–14 season, the Colchester United under-18 side secured a league and cup double by winning the Football League Youth Alliance South East division and the national Youth Alliance Cup.

== Under-23 squad ==
As of 11 August 2021.

Colchester United players who are eligible by age to play for the under-23 development squad (born on or after 1 January 1998).

Note: Flags indicate national team as defined under FIFA eligibility rules; some limited exceptions apply. Players may hold more than one non-FIFA nationality.

No.	Pos.	Nation	Player
3	DF	ENG	Ryan Clampin
6	MF	ENG	Brendan Sarpong-Wiredu
14	MF	ENG	Noah Chilvers
20	MF	POR	Diogo Freitas Gouveia
21	MF	ENG	Gene Kennedy
22	DF	CMR	Junior Tchamadeu
25	MF	ENG	Andre Hasanally
26	DF	ENG	Lordon Akolbire
29	GK	ENG	Shamal George
30	DF	ENG	Al-Amin Kazeem
31	MF	ENG	Donell Thomas

No.	Pos.	Nation	Player
32	FW	ENG	Jake Hutchinson
33	MF	ENG	Marley Marshall-Miranda
34	FW	ENG	Samson Tovide
35	DF	ENG	Billy Cracknell
36	DF	ENG	Harvey Sayer
40	DF	ENG	Frankie Terry
41	MF	ENG	Sam Cornish
42	FW	ENG	Tom Stagg
43	DF	ENG	Harry Beadle
44	GK	ENG	Ted Collins

== Staff ==
Current coaching and medical staff within the academy.

As of 7 August 2021

- Under 23s lead coach: Richard Hall
- Under-18s lead coach: Liam Bailey
- Under-18s assistant coach: Adam Lewis
- Academy goalkeeping coach: Paul Smith
- Academy sports science: Kem Ismail, James Lee
- Academy physio: Greg Barnes

== Academy graduates ==
The following players are graduates of the Colchester United Academy who have played for the Colchester United first-team since the academy's first year with Category Two status in July 2012.

Players who are still with the club are marked in italics.

- (Zimbabwe) Macauley Bonne
- (Scotland) James Bransgrove
- (England) Noah Chilvers
- (England) Ryan Clampin
- (England) Billy Cracknell
- (England) Jack Curtis
- (Republic of Ireland) Louis Dunne
- (Wales) Charley Edge
- (England) Alex Gilbey
- (England) Andre Hasanally
- (England) Conor Hubble
- (England) Tariq Issa
- (England) Cameron James
- (England) Frankie Kent
- (England) Ollie Kensdale
- (England) Freddie Ladapo
- (England) Tom Lapslie
- (England) Marley Marshall-Miranda
- (England) Eoin McKeown
- (England) Todd Miller
- (Republic of Ireland) Michael O'Donoghue
- (England) Tosin Olufemi
- (England) Dion Sembie-Ferris
- (England) Harvey Sayer
- (England) Dominic Smith
- (England) Tom Stagg
- (Republic of Ireland) Sammie Szmodics
- (Cameroon) Junior Tchamadeu
- (England) Samson Tovide
- (Grenada) Kane Vincent-Young
- (England) Diaz Wright
- (England) Drey Wright

== Honours ==
- Football League Youth Alliance South East
  - Winners: 2013–14
- Football League Youth Alliance Cup
  - Winners: 2013–14
