= 2020 SJK season =

SJK
2020 season
- Chairman: Raimo Sarajärvi
- Manager: Jani Honkavaara
- Stadium: OmaSP Stadion
- Veikkausliiga: 7th
- Finnish Cup: Sixth Round
- Top goalscorer: League: Emmanuel Ledesma (5); All: Joonas Lepistö (6)
Home colours	Away colours

The 2020 season was Seinäjoen Jalkapallokerho's 13th competitive season, and seventh in the Veikkausliiga.

== Squad ==
Note: Flags indicate national team as defined under FIFA eligibility rules; some limited exceptions apply. Players may hold more than one non-FIFA nationality.

No.	Pos.	Nation	Player
1	GK	FIN	Jesse Öst
2	DF	NZL	Nikko Boxall
3	DF	SEN	Seynabou Benga
4	DF	FIN	Matias Vainionpää
5	DF	FIN	Tero Mäntylä (Vice-captain)
6	MF	GHA	Jude Arthur
7	MF	FIN	Matej Hradecky (4th captain)
8	FW	ENG	Jake Jervis
9	MF	ARG	Emmanuel Ledesma
11	MF	UKR	Denys Oliynyk
14	FW	FIN	Jyri Kiuru
15	DF	MEX	Dárvin Chávez
16	DF	FIN	Joonas Sundman
17	DF	FIN	Ville Tikkanen

No.	Pos.	Nation	Player
18	DF	FIN	Niko Markkula
19	MF	FIN	Robin Sid
20	FW	FIN	Joonas Lepistö
21	MF	KOS	Anel Rashkaj
22	DF	BRA	Murilo
24	GK	FIN	Walter Viitala
25	MF	FIN	Daniel Håkans
27	MF	FIN	Aatu Kujanpää
29	FW	FIN	Jeremiah Streng
31	MF	FIN	Keaton Isaksson
32	GK	FIN	Mehdi El Moutacim
45	FW	FIN	Serge Atakayi
58	MF	FIN	Mehmet Hetemaj (Captain)
88	FW	CMR	Ariel Ngueukam (3rd captain)

== Transfers ==
=== In ===
Date	Position	Nationality	Name	From	Fee	Ref.
1 January 2020	GK	(Finland)	Mehdi El Moutacim	Ekenäs IF	Undisclosed	
1 January 2020	DF	(Finland)	Tero Mäntylä	HIFK	Undisclosed	
1 January 2020	DF	(Finland)	Niko Markkula	Inter Turku	Undisclosed	
1 January 2020	MF	(Finland)	Keaton Isaksson	IFK Mariehamn	Undisclosed	
1 January 2020	MF	(Finland)	Aatu Kujanpää	VPS	Undisclosed	
1 January 2020	MF	(Finland)	Robin Sid	IFK Mariehamn	Undisclosed	
1 January 2020	MF	(Ghana)	Jude Arthur	Liberty Professionals	Undisclosed	
1 January 2020	FW	(Cameroon)	Ariel Ngueukam	KuPS	Undisclosed	
1 January 2020	FW	(Finland)	Serge Atakayi	Rangers	Undisclosed	
13 January 2020	DF	(Mexico)	Dárvin Chávez	FF Jaro	Undisclosed	
7 February 2020	MF	(Kosovo)	Arjanit Krasniqi	Billericay Town	Undisclosed	
8 February 2020	MF	(Kosovo)	Anel Rashkaj	AFC Eskilstuna	Undisclosed	
16 February 2020	GK	(Finland)	Walter Viitala	Sandefjord	Undisclosed	
6 March 2020	MF	(Finland)	Matej Hradecky	TPS	Undisclosed	
24 July 2020	DF	(New Zealand)	Nikko Boxall	Viborg	Undisclosed	
19 August 2020	MF	(Argentina)	Emmanuel Ledesma	Unattached	Free	
19 August 2020	MF	(England)	Jake Jervis	Luton Town	Undisclosed	
27 August 2020	DF	(Brazil)	Murilo	Ourense	Undisclosed	

=== Released ===
Date	Position	Nationality	Name	Joined	Date	Ref
20 July 2020	DF	(Brazil)	Nadson			
7 September 2020	MF	(Kosovo)	Arjanit Krasniqi	Braintree Town	7 September 2020	
16 September 2020	FW	(England)	Billy Ions			

== Competitions ==
=== Veikkausliiga ===
==== League table ====
Pos	Team	Pld	W	D	L	GF	GA	GD	Pts
5	Ilves	22	10	6	6	37	29	+8	36
6	FC Lahti	22	8	8	6	33	30	+3	32
7	SJK	22	8	5	9	27	29	−2	29
8	HIFK	22	8	4	10	29	33	−4	28
9	IFK Mariehamn	22	6	5	11	29	43	−14	23

Source: ,
Rules for classification: 1) Points; 2) Goal difference; 3) Goals scored; 4) Head-to-head points; 5) Head-to-head goal difference; 6) Head-to-head away goals scored; 7) Play-off
(Note: Play-off is only played if need to decide champion, teams for relegation or UEFA competition and will be played on a neutral ground).

==== Results summary ====
Overall								Home						Away					
Pld	W	D	L	GF	GA	GD	Pts	W	D	L	GF	GA	GD	W	D	L	GF	GA	GD
22	8	5	9	27	29	−2	29	4	2	5	14	17	−3	4	3	4	13	12	+1

Last updated: 4 November 2020.
Source: See Results

==== Results by matchday ====
Round	1	2	3	4	5	6	7	8	9	10	11	12	13	14	15	16	17	18	19	20	21	22
Ground	H	A	H	A	A	H	H	A	A	H	A	H	H	A	A	H	H	H	A	H	A	A
Result	W	D	L	L	L	D	D	D	D	L	L	W	W	W	W	L	W	L	W	L	L	W

Updated to match(es) played on 4 November 2020. Source: See Results
A = Away; H = Home; W = Win; D = Draw; L = Loss

==== Results ====
1 July 2020 1	SJK	1 – 0	TPS	Seinäjoki
18:30 EEST (UTC+3)	Hradecky 11'	Report	Pikkarainen (yellow card) 85' (yellow-red card) 90+1'	Stadium: OmaSP Stadion; Referee: Petri Viljanen

8 July 2020 2	Lahti	0 – 0	SJK	Lahti
18:30 EEST (UTC+3)	Viitikko (yellow card) 62'	Report	Ngueukam (yellow card) 36'; Rashkaj (yellow card) 50'	Stadium: Lahti Stadium; Referee: Ville Nevalainen

17 July 2020 3	SJK	1 – 2	IFK Mariehamn	Seinäjoki
18:30 EEST (UTC+3)	Hetemaj 52' (yellow card) 90+6'	Report	Ademi 4'; Makrillos 55'; Taimi (yellow card) 87'	Stadium: OmaSP Stadion; Referee: Joni Hyytiä

22 July 2020 4	HIFK	2 – 1	SJK	Helsinki
18:30 EEST (UTC+3)	Selander (yellow card) 12'; Bäckman (yellow card) 21'; Mattila 27', 90+6'; Luís Henrique (yellow card) 40'; Yaghoubi (yellow card) 55'; Tiquinho (yellow card) 58'; Sharza (yellow card) 83'	Report	Håkans (yellow card) 12'; Atakayi (yellow card) 22'; Mäntylä (yellow card) 26' (yellow-red card) 67'; Oliynyk (yellow card) 74'; Ngueukam 79'; Hetemaj (yellow card) 86'	Stadium: Bolt Arena; Referee: Oskari Hamalainen

26 July 2020 5	KuPS	2 – 1	SJK	Kuopio
18:30 EEST (UTC+3)	Ions 5' (o.g.); Niskanen 18'	Report	Hetemaj (yellow card) 25'; Vainionpää (yellow card) 51' (yellow-red card) 73'; Oliynyk 63'; Boxall (yellow card) 78'; Ngueukam (yellow card) 85'	Stadium: Kuopio Football Stadium; Referee: Ville Nevalainen

1 August 2020 6	SJK	1 – 1	Haka	Seinäjoki
17:00 EEST (UTC+3)	Rashkaj (yellow card) 5'; Oliynyk (yellow card) 11'; Boxall (yellow card) 12'; Ngueukam 78'	Report	Medo (yellow card) 22'; Chidi 59'; Bushue (yellow card) 87'	Stadium: OmaSP Stadion; Referee: Antti Munukka

5 August 2020 7	SJK	1 – 1	KuPS	Seinäjoki
18:30 EEST (UTC+3)	Hetemaj (yellow card) 38'; Markkula 60' (pen.); Mäntylä (yellow card) 90+3'	Report	Pennanen 53'; Nissilä (yellow card) 58'; Savolainen (yellow card) 73'	Stadium: OmaSP Stadion; Referee: Kalle Mäkinen

10 August 2020 8	Honka	0 – 0	SJK	Espoo
18:30 EEST (UTC+3)	Tammilehto (yellow card) 30'; Hatakka (yellow card) 41'	Report	Atakayi (yellow card) 45'	Stadium: Tapiolan Urheilupuisto; Referee: Jari Järvinen

15 August 2020 9	Ilves	0 – 0	SJK	Tampere
17:00 EEST (UTC+3)	Tamminen (yellow card) 42'; Tomas (yellow card) 82'	Report	Markkula (yellow card) 45'; Hetemaj (yellow card) 49'; Vainionpää (yellow card) 90+1'	Stadium: Tammelan Stadion; Referee: Mikko Juusola

21 August 2020 10	SJK	0 – 2	Honka	Seinäjoki
18:30 EEST (UTC+3)	Vainionpää (yellow card) 8'; Sid (yellow card) 23'; Boxall (yellow card) 90'	Report	Martín (yellow card) 40'; Dongou 52', 59'; Kaufmann (yellow card) 78'	Stadium: OmaSP Stadion; Referee: Ville Nevalainen

26 August 2020 11	HJK	2 – 0	SJK	Helsinki
18:30 EEST (UTC+3)	Ro.Riski 13'; Browne 75'; Hannola (yellow card) 81'	Report	Atakayi (yellow card) 49'; Boxall (yellow card) 62'	Stadium: Bolt Arena; Referee: Jari Jarvinen

29 August 2020 12	SJK	2 – 1	RoPS	Seinäjoki
17:00 EEST (UTC+3)	Hetemaj 25' (yellow card) 50'; Sid (yellow card) 37'; Lepistö 59'; Ngueukam (yellow card) 90+3'	Report	Malolo (yellow card) 8'; Kaukua 75' (yellow card) 81'	Stadium: OmaSP Stadion; Referee: Mikko Juusola

9 September 2020 13	SJK	3 – 2	Inter Turku	Seinäjoki
18:30 EEST (UTC+3)	Ledesma 27' (yellow card) 63'; Lepistö 22', 67'	Report	Kagayama 6'; Ruane (yellow card) 46'; Ketting 88'	Stadium: OmaSP Stadion; Referee: Mohammad Al Emara

12 September 2020 14	Haka	1 – 4	SJK	Valkeakoski
17:00 EEST (UTC+3)	Ojala 47' (pen.) de Lucas (yellow card) 87'	Report	Ledesma 22' (pen.); Oliynyk 34'; Hetemaj 78'; Atakayi 88'	Stadium: Tehtaan kenttä Referee: Ville Nevalainen

19 September 2020 15	Inter Turku	0 – 1	SJK	Turku
17:00 EEST (UTC+3)	Hämäläinen (yellow card) 64'; Furuholm (yellow card) 73'	Report	Murilo 20' (yellow card) 32'; Ledesma (yellow card) 27'; Arthur (yellow card) 62'	Stadium: Veritas Stadion; Referee: Joni Hyytiä

23 September 2020 16	SJK	0 – 1	Lahti	Seinäjoki
18:30 EEST (UTC+3)	Mäntylä (yellow card) 36'	Report	Eninful (yellow card) 1'; Zeqiri (yellow card) 40'; Assehnoun 70'; Imbongo (yellow card) 90+1'	Stadium: OmaSP Stadion; Referee: Dennis Antamo

28 September 2020 17	SJK	3 – 2	HIFK	Seinäjoki
18:30 EEST (UTC+3)	Ngueukam 26' (pen.); Jervis 27'; Mäntylä (yellow card) 67'; Isaksson (yellow card) 77'; Lepistö 79'	Report	Mero (yellow card) 24'; Mattila 53' (red card) 90+5'; Bäckman (yellow card) 54'; Yaghoubi (yellow card) 78'; A.Fofana (yellow card) 79'; Vitinho 90+3'	Stadium: OmaSP Stadion; Referee: Petri Viljanen

15 October 2020 18	SJK	1 – 2	HJK	Seinäjoki
18:30 EEST (UTC+3)	Hetemaj (yellow card) 15'; Ledesma 32' (yellow card) 54'	Report	Ro.Riski 18'; Tanaka 70'; Ri.Riski (yellow card) 90+1'	Stadium: OmaSP Stadion; Referee: Kalle Makinen

18 October 2020 19	IFK Mariehamn	2 – 3	SJK	Mariehamn
16:00 EEST (UTC+3)	Buwalda (yellow card) 54'; Sjöroos (yellow card) 64'; Backaliden 67'; Ademi 84' (pen.)	Report	Jervis 15' (yellow card) 66'; Ledesma (yellow card) 78' (goal) 86'; Murilo (yellow card) 86'; Hradecky 89'	Stadium: Wiklöf Holding Arena; Referee: Dennis Antamo

22 October 2020 21	SJK	1 – 3	Ilves	Seinäjoki
18:30 EEST (UTC+3)	Jervis 38'	Report	Jair 6'; Mömmö 9'; Tomas (yellow card) 30'; Ala-Myllymäki 35' (pen.); Veteli (yellow card) 70'; Fofana (yellow card) 74'	Stadium: OmaSP Stadion; Referee: Mohammad Al Emara

31 October 2020 21	TPS	1 – 0	SJK	Turku
16:00 EET (UTC+2)	Ääritalo 48'	Report	Murilo (yellow card) 87'	Stadium: Veritas Stadion; Referee: Mattias Gestranius

4 November 2020 22	RoPS	2 – 3	SJK	Rovaniemi
18:30 EET (UTC+2)	Muinonen 64'; Vainionpää 90+2'	Report	Ledesma 54'; Ngueukam 74' (pen.); Jervis (yellow card) 85'; Hetemaj 90+3'	Stadium: Keskuskenttä; Referee: Mohammad Al Emara

=== Finnish Cup ===
==== Sixth Round ====
Team	Pld	W	D	L	GF	GA	GD	Pts
FC Ilves	5	3	2	0	10	4	+6	11
KuPS	5	3	2	0	8	2	+6	11
FC Haka	5	3	2	0	7	3	+4	11
FC Lahti	5	2	0	3	6	7	−1	6
SJK	5	0	1	4	4	11	−7	1
RoPS	5	0	1	4	3	11	−8	1

25 January 2020 1	RoPS	1 – 1	SJK	Oulu
14:00 EET (UTC+2)	Malolo (yellow card) 11'; Muinonen 60'	Report	Chávez 77'	Stadium: Heinäpään tekonurmi Attendance: 250; Referee: Dennis Antamo

1 February 2020 2	SJK	1 – 3	Haka	Seinäjoki
14:00 EET (UTC+2)	Markkula 26'; Benga (yellow card) 56'; Kujanpää (yellow card) 72'	Report	Popovits (yellow card) 18'; Malundama 20'; Chidi 44'; Häkkinen (yellow card) 54'; Saarinen 63'	Stadium: Wallsport Areena; Referee: Daniel Enkvist

8 February 2020 3	SJK	2 – 3	Lahti	Seinäjoki
14:00 EET (UTC+2)	Arthur (yellow card) 31'; Lepistö 35', 53'; Mäntylä (yellow card) 61'	Report	Imbongo 26' (yellow card) 41'; Hambo (yellow card) 39' (goal) 73', 86'	Stadium: Wallsport Areena; Referee: Petri Viljanen

14 February 2020 4	KuPS	1 – 0	SJK	Kuopio
18:30 EET (UTC+2)	Rangel 56'; Niskanen (yellow card) 71'	Report	Hetemaj (yellow card) 13'; Mäntylä (yellow card) 68'	Stadium: Kuopiohalli; Referee: Jani Laaksonen

22 February 2020 5	Ilves	3 – 0	SJK	Tampere
14:30 EET (UTC+2)	Fofana 27'; Tendeng 57'; Miettunen 74'; Mensah (yellow card) 90+1'	Report	Ngueukam (yellow card) 31'; Atakayi (yellow card) 42'; Rashkaj (yellow card) 58'; Lepistö (yellow card) 60'; Nadson (yellow card) 66'; Laitinen (yellow card) 85'	Stadium: Pirkkahalli; Referee: Antti Munukka

== Squad statistics ==
As of Match played 4 November 2020

=== Appearances and goals ===
No.	Pos	Nat	Player	Total		Veikkausliiga		Finnish Cup	
No.	Pos	Nat	Player	Apps	Goals	Apps	Goals	Apps	Goals
1	GK	(Finland) FIN	Jesse Öst	18	0	14	0	4	0
2	DF	(New Zealand) NZL	Nikko Boxall	17	0	17	0	0	0
3	DF	(Senegal) SEN	Seynabou Benga	3	0	0	0	3	0
4	DF	(Finland) FIN	Matias Vainionpää	15	0	14+1	0	0	0
5	DF	(Finland) FIN	Tero Mäntylä	24	0	19	0	5	0
6	MF	(Ghana) GHA	Jude Arthur	18	0	6+7	0	3+2	0
7	MF	(Finland) FIN	Matej Hradecky	19	2	19	2	0	0
8	MF	(England) ENG	Jake Jervis	10	3	7+3	3	0	0
9	MF	(Argentina) ARG	Emmanuel Ledesma	11	5	11	5	0	0
11	MF	(Ukraine) UKR	Denys Oliynyk	25	2	11+9	2	3+2	0
14	FW	(Finland) FIN	Jyri Kiuru	2	0	0+2	0	0	0
15	DF	(Mexico) MEX	Dárvin Chávez	6	1	2+2	0	2	1
16	DF	(Finland) FIN	Joonas Sundman	6	0	0+5	0	0+1	0
17	DF	(Finland) FIN	Ville Tikkanen	16	0	14	0	1+1	0
18	DF	(Finland) FIN	Niko Markkula	18	2	12+2	1	4	1
19	MF	(Finland) FIN	Robin Sid	15	0	9+5	0	1	0
20	FW	(Finland) FIN	Joonas Lepistö	19	6	7+7	4	3+2	2
21	MF	(Kosovo) KOS	Anel Rashkaj	15	0	8+5	0	2	0
22	DF	(Brazil) BRA	Murilo	10	1	10	1	0	0
24	GK	(Finland) FIN	Walter Viitala	8	0	8	0	0	0
25	MF	(Finland) FIN	Daniel Håkans	14	0	6+5	0	2+1	0
27	MF	(Finland) FIN	Aatu Kujanpää	3	0	0	0	2+1	0
29	FW	(Finland) FIN	Jeremiah Streng	6	0	0+1	0	2+3	0
31	MF	(Finland) FIN	Keaton Isaksson	17	0	5+9	0	3	0
32	GK	(Finland) FIN	Mehdi El Moutacim	1	0	0	0	1	0
45	FW	(Finland) FIN	Serge Atakayi	24	1	15+4	1	3+2	0
58	MF	(Finland) FIN	Mehmet Hetemaj	22	4	11+6	4	5	0
88	FW	(Cameroon) CMR	Ariel Ngueukam	19	4	14+4	4	1	0
	DF	(Finland) FIN	Joel Laitinen	3	0	0	0	2+1	0
U23 Players:
Players away from the club on loan:
Players who left SJK during the season:
10	FW	(England) ENG	Billy Ions	9	0	3+6	0	0	0
23	MF	(Kosovo) KOS	Arjanit Krasniqi	2	0	0	0	0+2	0
30	DF	(Brazil) BRA	Nadson	3	0	0	0	3	0

=== Goal scorers ===
Place	Position	Nation	Number	Name	Veikkausliiga	Finnish Cup	Total
1	FW	(Finland)	20	Joonas Lepistö	4	2	6
2	MF	(Argentina)	9	Emmanuel Ledesma	5	0	5
3	MF	(Finland)	58	Mehmet Hetemaj	4	0	4
3	FW	(Cameroon)	88	Ariel Ngueukam	4	0	4
5	FW	(England)	8	Jake Jervis	3	0	3
6	MF	(Finland)	7	Matej Hradecky	2	0	2
6	MF	(Ukraine)	77	Denys Oliynyk	2	0	2
6	MF	(Finland)	18	Niko Markkula	1	1	2
9	DF	(Brazil)	22	Murilo	1	0	1
9	FW	(Finland)	45	Serge Atakayi	1	0	1
9	DF	(Mexico)	15	Dárvin Chávez	0	1	1
TOTALS					27	4	31

=== Clean sheets ===
Place	Position	Nation	Number	Name	Veikkausliiga	Finnish Cup	Total
1	GK	(Finland)	1	Jesse Öst	3	0	3
2	GK	(Finland)	24	Walter Viitala	2	0	2
TOTALS					5	0	5

=== Disciplinary record ===
Number	Nation	Position	Name	Veikkausliiga		Finnish Cup		Total	
Number	Nation	Position	Name	Yellow card	Red card	Yellow card	Red card	Yellow card	Red card
2	(New Zealand)	DF	Nikko Boxall	4	0	0	0	4	0
3	(Senegal)	DF	Seynabou Benga	0	0	1	0	1	0
4	(Finland)	DF	Matias Vainionpää	4	1	0	0	4	1
5	(Finland)	DF	Tero Mäntylä	5	1	2	0	7	1
6	(Ghana)	MF	Jude Arthur	1	0	1	0	2	0
8	(England)	FW	Jake Jervis	2	0	0	0	2	0
9	(Argentina)	MF	Emmanuel Ledesma	4	0	0	0	4	0
11	(Ukraine)	MF	Denys Oliynyk	2	0	0	0	2	0
18	(Finland)	DF	Niko Markkula	1	0	0	0	1	0
19	(Finland)	MF	Robin Sid	2	0	0	0	2	0
20	(Finland)	FW	Joonas Lepistö	0	0	1	0	1	0
21	(Kosovo)	MF	Anel Rashkaj	2	0	1	0	3	0
22	(Brazil)	DF	Murilo	3	0	0	0	3	0
25	(Finland)	MF	Daniel Håkans	1	0	0	0	1	0
27	(Finland)	MF	Aatu Kujanpää	0	0	1	0	1	0
31	(Finland)	MF	Keaton Isaksson	1	0	0	0	1	0
45	(Finland)	FW	Serge Atakayi	3	0	1	0	4	0
58	(Finland)	MF	Mehmet Hetemaj	7	0	1	0	8	0
88	(Cameroon)	FW	Ariel Ngueukam	3	0	1	0	4	0
	(Finland)	DF	Joel Laitinen	0	0	1	0	1	0
Players who left SJK during the season:
30	(Brazil)	DF	Nadson	0	0	1	0	1	0
TOTALS				45	0	12	2	57	2
