= 2019–20 Colchester United F.C. season =

Colchester United F.C.
2019–20 season
- Owner: Robbie Cowling
- Chairman: Robbie Cowling
- Head coach: John McGreal
- Stadium: Colchester Community Stadium
- League Two: 6th
- Play-offs: Semi-final (eliminated by Exeter City)
- FA Cup: First round (eliminated by Coventry City)
- EFL Cup: Quarter-final (eliminated by Manchester United)
- EFL Trophy: Second round (southern section) (eliminated by Stevenage)
- Top goalscorer: League: Theo Robinson (11); All: Theo Robinson (12)
- Highest home attendance: 9,481 v Tottenham Hotspur, 24 September 2019
- Lowest home attendance: 959 v Stevenage, 3 December 2019
- Average home league attendance: 3,606
- Biggest win: 3–0 v Swindon Town, 13 August 2019 & 17 September 2019 v Plymouth Argyle, 8 February 2020 v Carlisle United, 7 March 2020
- Biggest defeat: 0–3 v Manchester United, 18 December 2019 v Port Vale, 15 February 2020
Home colours	Away colours	Third colours

The 2019–20 season was Colchester United's 83rd season in their history and their fourth successive season competing in League Two. Along with competing in League Two, the club participated in the FA Cup, EFL Cup and EFL Trophy.

In a season that was severely disrupted by the COVID-19 pandemic, Colchester reached the play-offs after the season was drawn to an early close. The U's occupied a play-off spot when the season was postponed on 13 March 2020. The campaign officially ended on 9 June following a vote by all League Two member clubs. Final league positions were determined on a points-per-game basis, and Colchester's 1.57 points per game was enough to secure sixth position in the league and the third of four play-off spots.

In their play-off semi-final first leg with Exeter City, the U's won 1–0 at home, but lost 3–2 on aggregate following a 3–1 extra-time defeat at St James Park.

Colchester equalled their best-ever performance in the EFL Cup, reaching the quarter-finals. After dispatching of League Two rivals Swindon Town in the first round, the U's travelled to Premier League Crystal Palace in round two. Their resolute defending took the tie to a penalty shoot-out which they won 5–4. In the third round, Colchester hosted further Premier League opposition, with Tottenham Hotspur visiting the Colchester Community Stadium. Again, Colchester's staunched defending took the tie to penalties and they went on to win 4–3. In the fourth round, Colchester beat league rivals Crawley Town 3–1 to set up a trip to Old Trafford to take on Manchester United. Three second-half goals were enough for the home side to seal a convincing victory.

In the EFL Trophy, Colchester won their first group with wins over Gillingham and local rivals Ipswich Town, but were defeated in the second round by Stevenage.

Colchester's FA Cup campaign ended in the first round with a home defeat by League One side Coventry City.

== Season overview ==
=== Preseason ===
Colchester's place in League Two for the 2019–20 season was confirmed on the final day of the 2018–19 season on 4 May 2019 after a dramatic late goal for Newport County ensured they finished ahead of the U's in seventh place achieving a place in the play-offs.

The club announced the first departures of the close season on 14 May when twelve under-23 and Academy graduates were not offered new deals. These players included David Agboola, Aaron Barnes, George Brown, Ken Charles, Noah Chesmain, Chris Forino, Arjanit Krasniqi, Eoin McKeown, Paul Rooney, Decarrey Sheriff, Sam Warde and Will Wright.

On 17 May, young midfielder Kwame Poku signed his first professional contract, joining United from Worthing following a successful trial at the end of the 2018–19 season.

On 20 May, Colchester announced that all out of contract players had been offered new deals, except for forward Mikael Mandron, who was allowed to leave the club after two years and 95 appearances, and winger Ryan Gondoh, who had spent the end of last season on loan at FC Halifax Town.

Brennan Dickenson opted against signing a new contract with Colchester, instead signing for newly promoted League One club Milton Keynes Dons on 30 May.

On 7 June, Colchester announced the signing of former Leicester City under-23 midfielder Sammie McLeod on a two-year contract, joining from Maldon & Tiptree to link up with the U's under-23 side.

On 11 June, forward Junior Ogedi-Uzokwe, who had been on loan at Derry City until 1 June, had his contract extended by a further year after Colchester activated a clause in his contract. He would remain on loan with Derry until the end of the 2019 League of Ireland Premier Division season on 19 November.

Long-serving defender Tom Eastman agreed a two-year contract extension on 13 June.

On 18 June, Colchester signed former VfB Stuttgart defender Danny Collinge on a two-year contract.

Sam Saunders ended his short association with the club on 21 June by announcing his retirement from playing at the age of 35.

After making 141 appearances for the club, defender Frankie Kent left Colchester to sign for League One Peterborough United for an undisclosed fee on 22 June.

On 26 June, Colchester signed Malta international winger Luke Gambin on a two-year contract from Luton Town.

Sammie Szmodics ended a 16-year association with Colchester United on 28 June when he signed for Championship side Bristol City on a three-year deal in an undisclosed compensation deal after his U's contract had expired.

On 1 July, Colchester made several movements in the transfer market. First, they announced Diaz Wright had signed a one-year contract extension with the club. Then, winger Michael Fernandes arrived from Farnborough on a two-year deal, Next, it was announced goalkeeper coach and player Rene Gilmartin had opted to leave the U's to join Bristol City, before announcing the signing of Colchester-born Yeovil Town defender Omar Sowunmi on a two-year contract for an undisclosed fee.

On 2 July, Colchester announced that TEXO Scaffolding would be the new front of home shirt sponsors for kits for the next three seasons. Later the same day, the club announced the signing of Denmark youth international Matthew Weaire from Brighton & Hove Albion on a two-year contract.

On 3 July, Luke Ige arrived from Aston Villa on a one-year contract to join up with the Under-23 squad.

On 4 July, Colchester made a double signing with Cambridge United forward Jevani Brown arriving on a two-year contract for an undisclosed fee, while Paris Cowan-Hall later arrived at the club following his release from Wycombe Wanderers. The winger also signed a two-year deal with the U's.

Colchester started their pre-season friendlies with a game at Isthmian League Premier Division side Bowers & Pitsea on 5 July where they ran out 2–0 winners. The second-half goals were scored by Louis Dunne and Luke Norris.

In the U's second pre-season friendly on 9 July, they took on Dulwich Hamlet of the National League South. Colchester again won 2–0, with second-half goals from Courtney Senior and summer signing Omar Sowunmi.

On 13 July, Dean Gerken signed for Colchester following his release from Ipswich Town at the end of the 2018–19 season. He had been training with the U's and signed ahead of their friendly with Cefn Druids the same day.

New signing Gerken played the opening 45 minutes as the U's beat the Welsh side 3–0 with goals from Andre Hasanally in the first half, and Omar Sowunmi and Luke Norris in the second half.

On 16 July, Colchester won 3–0 at Wealdstone with goals coming from three new signings; Paris Cowan-Hall, Michael Fernandes and Luke Gambin.

On 19 July, young winger Todd Miller left the club to join Premier League side Brighton & Hove Albion, with the U's expected to receive compensation for the teenager. The same day, in their first home friendly of pre-season, Colchester suffered a 5–0 defeat to neighbours and rivals Ipswich Town. The visitors led 1–0 going into half-time, with four goals arriving in the second half.

After turning down a new contract with the club, goalkeeper Dillon Barnes signed for Championship club Queens Park Rangers on a two-year contract on 22 July.

On 23 July, Charlton Athletic won 2–1 with a late goal in the U's latest pre-season friendly after Luke Norris had handed the home side the lead early in the second half.

In Colchester's final pre-season friendly, Luke Norris scored again to secure a late 1–1 draw with Dover Athletic on 27 July.

=== August ===
On the eve of the season opener against Port Vale, Colchester signed former Arsenal left-back Cohen Bramall on a two-year contract.

Colchester were held to a 1–1 draw by Port Vale at the Colchester Community Stadium on 3 August. The visitors took the lead through a Tom Pope penalty in the fifth minute, but the U's equalised through Luke Norris on the stroke of half-time.

Plymouth Argyle hosted the U's on 10 August and won 1–0 with a second-half goal from Antoni Sarcevic.

The U's earned their first victory of the season on 13 August in their EFL Cup first round tie with Swindon Town. On the back of a goalless first half, both teams had a man sent off for violent conduct in the 62nd minute, with Cohen Bramall shown red for Colchester and Jerry Yates for Swindon. Tom Eastman broke the deadlock in the 77th minute, before substitute Courtney Senior doubled the lead in the second minute of injury time. Fellow substitute Brandon Comley added a third in the seventh minute of injury time to complete the 3–0 victory and see the U's reach the second round for the first time since 2010.

On 17 August, Colchester hosted Cambridge United in the league. A ninth minute Luke Norris penalty gave the U's a 1–0 lead going into the interval, but two Cambridge goals in the second half left Colchester to a 2–1 defeat.

Ipswich Town confirmed the signing of Kane Vincent-Young on 19 August for an undisclosed fee reportedly in the region of £500,000. He left the U's to sign a four-year deal with Town with the option of a further year.

Colchester continued their winless run with another second-half collapse against Grimsby Town on 20 August. Frank Nouble and Luke Norris had given the U's a 2–0 first-half lead, but goals for Grimsby in the 48th and 87th minutes succumbed them to a draw and more dropped points.

On 24 August, the U's picked up their first league win of the season, beating Northampton Town 1–0 courtesy of a Luke Norris penalty, who racked up his fourth goal in five league matches.

In the second round of the EFL Cup on 27 August, Colchester travelled to Premier League Crystal Palace. Following a goalless 90 minutes, the match went to a penalty shoot-out. Andros Townsend stepped up to take the first penalty for the hosts, but his effort was saved by Dean Gerken in the U's goal. Each of the following penalties were scored by their takers, and U's Academy product Noah Chilvers converted the decisive spot kick to send Colchester through to the third round and their first win in the League Cup against top-flight opponents since 1979.

On 28 August, Colchester signed young Bristol City striker Freddie Hinds on loan until January.

On 29 August, the U's signed another striker with the arrival of Southend United's Theo Robinson on loan until January.

After making his first-team debut on the opening weekend of the season, Andre Hasanally signed his first professional contract with the club on 30 August, signing until June 2022.

Colchester rounded out August with a 1–0 win at Oldham Athletic on 31 August. Frank Nouble's strike on the stroke of half-time proved to be the difference between the sides.

=== September ===
On 2 September, transfer deadline day, Colchester signed young Charlton Athletic midfielder Brendan Sarpong-Wiredu on loan until January, with injuries ruling out Tom Lapslie, Harry Pell and Diaz Wright, and with Brandon Comley and Luke Gambin on international duty.

Sarpong-Wiredu and Kwame Poku both made their debuts on 3 September in Colchester's 3–2 EFL Trophy win against Gillingham. Paris Cowan-Hall scored his first goal for the U's after just eight minutes, before Gillingham equalised. Theo Robinson then scored his first goal for the club after 55 minutes to put the visitors back in front, before Cowan-Hall recorded his second goal of the evening to put Colchester 3–1 up. Former U's player Mikael Mandron pulled a goal back for Gillingham but Colchester held on for victory.

On 5 September, Colchester signed former loanee winger Callum Harriott on a two-year contract following his release from Reading during the summer.

On 7 September, Colchester were held to a goalless draw by Walsall at the Community Stadium.

On 14 September, Colchester were beaten 1–0 at Forest Green Rovers following a Luke Prosser own goal.

Colchester returned to winning ways on 17 September with another 3–0 win against Swindon Town, on this occasion away in the league. Tom Eastman opened the scoring in first-half injury time before a Theo Robinson brace sealed the win.

On 21 September, Colchester won 2–1 at home to Leyton Orient. Kwame Poku scored his debut professional goal after just three minutes, before Ryan Jackson doubled the U's lead in the 28th minute. Conor Wilkinson pulled a goal back for the visitors just after half-time but Colchester held on to move them up to tenth in the League Two table.

Colchester drew their biggest crowd of the season of 9,481 when they hosted Premier League side Tottenham Hotspur in the third round of the EFL Cup on 24 September. Colchester had last reached the third round in the 2004–05 campaign. Colchester were dominated by the opposition for much of the game, registering just four shots and none on target while Spurs had 75 per cent possession. Despite this, a resilient U's side held on for 90 minutes with the tie ending goalless and going on to a penalty shoot-out. Dean Gerken in the Colchester goal saved the first penalty from Christian Eriksen, and despite Jevani Brown's poor Panenka penalty kick keeping the score level overall, Lucas Moura hit the bar only for Tom Lapslie to score the winning penalty for the U's. This put them through to the fourth round for the first time since the 1974–75 when they reached the quarter-finals.

The U's returned to league action on 28 September, drawing 1–1 at Macclesfield Town. Theo Robinson scored Colchester's goal, his fourth of the season.

=== October ===
On 5 October, Colchester started the month with a 3–1 win against League Two's bottom club Stevenage. The visitors opened the scoring with a first-half deflected goal, but Tom Eastman equalised shortly after the break. It was not until the 82nd minute that the U's took the lead after Frank Nouble had been fouled in the penalty area and he stepped up to convert the spot kick. A minute later, he turned provider for Kwame Poku to score his second Colchester goal and seal the victory.

After beating the Tottenham Hotspur first-team in the EFL Cup, Colchester hosted their under-21 side in the EFL Trophy group stage. A Luke Norris headed goal put Colchester ahead on 44 minutes, but the visitors equalised 15 minutes from full time through Tashan Oakley-Boothe. The game ended 1–1 and the match went to a penalty shoot-out, which Spurs won to claim a bonus point.

On 11 October, teenage defender Ollie Kensdale joined National League South side Bath City in a month-long loan deal.

Colchester visited Crawley Town on 12 October, and despite taking a first half lead through Luke Prosser, the home side scored twice in the second half to claim victory.

On 18 October, Noah Chilvers joined Ollie Kensdale at Bath City in a month-long loan deal.

On 19 October, Colchester suffered their second successive defeat, on this occasion a 1–0 reverse against League Two's bottom side Morecambe.

Colchester held league leaders Crewe Alexandra to a 0–0 draw at Gresty Road on 22 October, but had the chance to win the game from the penalty spot in the seventh minute of stoppage time. However, Crewe goalkeeper Will Jääskeläinen saved Frank Nouble's effort after U's forward Theo Robinson had been sent off in an off the ball incident after the penalty had been awarded.

Colchester returned to winning ways on 26 October for the first time in three weeks with a 3–1 home win against Newport County. The visitors were in front after just five minutes, but first-half goals from Ryan Jackson and Ben Stevenson put the U's in control. A goal from Courtney Senior 15 minutes from the full-time whistle rounded off the victory for Colchester.

On 29 October, Colchester reached the quarter-final of the League Cup for only the second time in the club's history, coming from behind to win 3–1 for the second time in three days. Crawley were the hosts and opened the scoring on 20 minutes, but a Luke Norris header two minutes later levelled the score. In the second half, Colchester went ahead after Cohen Bramall's free kick hit the bar, struck Crawley goalkeeper Michael Luyambula and went in. Substitute and former-Crawley loanee Luke Gambin sealed victory in the 79th minute, his first goal for the U's.

=== November ===
Colchester travelled to Mansfield Town on 2 November where they won 3–2. The U's took an eighth-minute lead through Brandon Comley, but Mansfield equalised on the stroke of half-time. Courtney Senior reinstated Colchester's lead on 74 minutes, before Luke Gambin scored his second in as many games three minutes from full time to secure victory. In the 90th minute, Omari Sterling-James pulled a goal back for the home side.

On 8 November, Cameron James joined National League South side Maidstone United on loan for a month.

Colchester suffered defeat in the FA Cup first round for the fourth consecutive season when they lost 2–0 to League One side Coventry City on 9 November.

U's youngsters Luke Ige and Ollie Sims were loaned out to Witham Town and Bowers & Pitsea, respectively, on initial 28-day contracts.

On 12 November, Colchester played their final group game in the EFL Trophy. They faced Ipswich Town and won 1–0 with a first senior goal from Ryan Clampin, topping the group in the process.

Colchester were held to a 1–1 draw at Cheltenham Town on 23 November. Luke Norris scored his fifth league goal of the season to hand the visitors the lead, but in the second half, Dean Gerken fouled Reuben Reid in the penalty area and Conor Thomas converted to equalise.

=== December ===
On 3 December, Colchester were defeated in the second round of the EFL Trophy at home to Stevenage in front of a crowd of just 959. Stevenage led 2–0 after half an hour of play, but the home side pulled a goal back in the second half from a Chris Stokes own goal.

Teenage midfielder Kwame Poku, who had only joined Colchester in the summer of 2019, signed a new 2 1/2-year contract extension with the club on 5 December to keep him with the U's until summer 2022.

On 7 December, Colchester earned their first win in almost a month with a 93rd-minute winner against Salford City in the first-ever meeting between the two clubs. Harry Pell scored his first goal of the season with an injury time header.

Midfielder Diaz Wright joined National League side Dagenham & Redbridge on loan until 6 January 2020. Also leaving the club on loan was fellow midfielder Tyrique Hyde, who joined Dartford in the National League South for one month.

After falling behind by two goals in their League Two game at Scunthorpe United on 14 December, Colchester battled back in the second half to claim a 2–2 draw. Former Colchester loanee Abo Eisa scored late in the first half for the home side, then Kevin van Veen doubled Scunthorpe's advantage two minutes into the second half. Luke Norris scored to reduced the deficit just before the hour mark, and Luke Prosser scored his second of the season four minutes later to earn a point for the U's.

Colchester travelled to Old Trafford for the first time in their history to face Manchester United in the EFL Cup quarter-final. The visitors held their Premier League opposition in the first half, going in to the interval at 0–0. In the second half, it took Marcus Rashford six minutes to open the scoring, and five minutes later, Ryan Jackson scored an own goal to double United's lead. Anthony Martial added a third on 61 minutes to complete the scoring.

Colchester continued their good run of league form with a commanding 3–0 win over Carlisle United at the Community Stadium on 21 December. Nathaniel Knight-Percival's own goal in the 26th minute put the U's 1–0 up and Callum Harriott's first goal since his return to the club doubled Colchester's advantage in the 41st minute. In the second half, Cohen Bramall registered his first goal in the English Football League with a well taken free kick seven minutes after the restart to seal the victory.

In the early League Two kickoff on Boxing Day, Colchester beat Leyton Orient 3–1 at Brisbane Road to move up to fourth in the table. Theo Robinson gave the U's a 1–0 lead after 41 minutes, then Harry Pell doubled Colchester's lead in the 64th minute. Orient pulled a goal back four minutes from time, but Robinson added a second for himself and scored Colchester's third goal in the 91st minute.

Fourth-placed Colchester hosted second-placed Exeter City in their final game of 2019 on 29 December. The visitors took an eighth-minute lead through Jake Taylor, but Harry Pell levelled the score after 16 minutes to earn his second goal in as many games. After the break, Theo Robinson put the U's in front with his third goal in two games. Tom Lapslie was sent off for a foul in the penalty area and denying a goalscoring opportunity, a penalty which substitute Ryan Bowman converted. Colchester held on with ten men to draw 2–2.

=== January ===
Colchester maintained their unbeaten run with a 1–1 draw with Crawley on New Year's Day. Frank Nouble's fourth goal of the season in the 64th minute was later cancelled out by a Luke Prosser own goal.

On 4 January, Jevani Brown left the club to join League Two rivals Forest Green Rovers on loan until the end of the season, having played 17 games for the U's but only five in the league.

Also on 4 January, Colchester were held to a disappointing 0–0 draw against ten-man, bottom of the table Stevenage. Tom Soares had been sent off for the home side in the 19th minute, but a dominant Colchester could not get the ball past Stevenage goalkeeper Paul Farman.

On 6 January, Percy Kiangebeni joined Southern League Premier Division South side Hendon on loan for a month.

On 8 January, Tyrique Hyde extended his loan spell at Dartford for a further month.

On 10 January, both Cameron James and Diaz Wright joined National League South side Welling United on loan for one month.

Colchester were held to a 1–1 draw on 11 January at League Two's bottom club Morecambe. The U's had taken a 35th-minute lead through Frank Nouble, but were pegged back on 69 minutes. Ryan Jackson was then sent off seven minutes from time for a second booking.

On 14 January, Colchester confirmed the signing of Theo Robinson on loan from Southend until the end of the season.

On 18 January, Plymouth Argyle defender Tafari Moore joined Colchester on loan until the end of the season. He went straight into the U's squad to face Macclesfield Town the same day. Later that day, Moore played 60 minutes as Colchester ended a streak of four consecutive draws to record a 2–1 victory. Callum Harriott opened the scoring after 14 minutes, before the lead was doubled following a Fiacre Kelleher own goal. The visitors reduced the deficit in the second half but the U's held on to extend their unbeaten run to 13 games.

Colchester were held to a 0–0 draw at home by Bradford City on 21 January. Their game in hand to clubs around them meant they moved back into the play-off places.

On 25 January, midfielder Louis Dunne joined Southern League Premier Division South side Farnborough on loan until the end of February.

Colchester moved up to fifth in the League Two table with a 0–0 draw at second-placed Exeter City on 25 January to record their sixth draw in seven games.

The U's hosted league leaders Swindon Town on 28 January. The visitors took the lead three minutes after half-time, but Luke Norris scored against his old club to level the score on 74 minutes. Fifteen minutes later and Colchester had taken a 3–1 lead following a Theo Robinson brace in the 85th and 89th minutes. The match finished 3–1 to the U's as they recorded their third victory of the season against Swindon.

=== February ===
Colchester's unbeaten run, stretching back to October, was finally ended on 1 February to managerless Cambridge United. Similar to Colchester's August home defeat to Cambridge, Luke Norris had given the U's the lead, but two goals within the space of 70 seconds late in the second half ended their 16-game streak.

On 5 February, the club announced the departure of Junior Ogedi-Uzokwe to Israeli Premier League side Hapoel Hadera on a permanent contract.

The U's bounced back from their defeat to Cambridge in impressive style, beating Plymouth Argyle 3–0 on 8 February. Argyle had started the day in the automatic promotion positions, but three first-half goals sealed victory for the home side. Ben Stevenson opened the scoring for Colchester after 14 minutes, then Theo Robinson headed in his tenth goal of the season on the half-hour mark. Six minutes later, he earned himself a brace to record a convincing victory.

On 11 February, Colchester were beaten at home by Grimsby Town. After taking the lead through captain Luke Prosser after 17 minutes, Charles Vernam scored for the away side four minutes later. The U's retook the lead three minutes before half time with Theo Robinson's twelfth goal for the club. However, Vernam scored two goals in the space of three second-half minutes to snatch a victory for Grimsby.

Colchester fell to their heaviest league defeat of the season on 15 February when they were beaten 3–0 at Port Vale.

After leaving league rivals Macclesfield Town in January, defender Miles Welch-Hayes on 21 February on a free transfer. He signed a contract until summer 2022.

On 23 February, Colchester won their first match in three games with a 2–1 victory at Salford City. Kwame Poku's solo effort put the U's ahead, before Callum Harriott doubled the advantage after 41 minutes. Two minutes later, the home side pulled a goal back through Ashley Hunter, but the visitors held on for the win.

On 29 February, Colchester dropped out of the play-off places and had Omar Sowunmi sent off as they fell to a 2–0 home defeat to Cheltenham Town.

=== Season postponement ===
Colchester made a quick return to the play-off positions with a convincing 3–0 away win at Carlisle United on 7 March. Kwame Poku opened the scoring for the U's on 41 minutes, and the lead was doubled by Luke Norris two minutes later. Poku then earned himself a brace in the 59th minute.

On 13 March, the EFL suspended the season until 3 April at the earliest in light of the COVID-19 pandemic.

On 3 April, the EFL provided an update to the postponement of the season by suspending all football indefinitely until matches were safe to resume.

On 27 April, two days after they were scheduled to have played their final game of the 2019–20 season, Colchester United became the first English Football League team to announce the release of first-team players in light of the COVID-19 pandemic. Chairman Robbie Cowling announced that four first-team players, namely Brandon Comley, Ryan Jackson, Frank Nouble and club captain Luke Prosser, would not be offered new deals once their contracts expired at the end of June. This was despite the fact that Cowling admitted under normal circumstances he "would have been determined to re-sign".

The following day, the club released a list of twelve further players who would not be offered new deals on the expiry of their current contracts. These included Dean Ager, Callum Anderson, Jamal Campbell-Ryce, Louis Dunne, Chandler Hallett, Tyrique Hyde, Luke Ige, Tariq Issa, Cameron James, Callum Jones, Percy Kiangebeni and Bailey Vose.

On 9 June, League Two clubs voted in favour of ending the season with immediate effect. As Colchester were placed sixth in the League Two table, they were confirmed a play-off place, with the U's set to face Exeter City in the semi-finals.

Colchester played their play-off semi-final first leg at an empty Colchester Community Stadium on 18 June. The hosts won the tie 1–0 through a Cohen Bramall free-kick late in the second half.

In the play-off semi-final second leg on 22 June, Colchester were beaten 3–1 after extra time, with Exeter heading to the Wembley final with a 3–2 aggregate victory. The hosts had taken an early lead, before taking control of the tie with a second goal just before the hour mark. Courtney Senior levelled the score on aggregate 2–1 after 78 minutes, before the tie went to extra time. With nine minutes remaining, Exeter scored again to progress to the final and spelt another season in League Two for the U's.

== Players ==
As of 22 June 2020

No.	Name	Position	Nat.	Place of birth	Date of birth	Apps	Goals	Signed from	Date signed	Fee
Goalkeepers
1	Dean Gerken	GK	(England)	Southend-on-Sea	22 May 1985 (aged 34)	126	0	(England) Ipswich Town	13 July 2019 (Note: Date of signing refers to the date of the player's signing for his second spell with the club)	Free transfer
29	Ethan Ross	GK	(England)	Enfield Town	6 March 1997 (aged 22)	3	0	(England) West Bromwich Albion	7 June 2018	Free transfer
32	Bailey Vose	GK	(England)	Sidcup	11 May 1998 (aged 21)	0	0	(England) Brighton & Hove Albion	24 May 2018	Undisclosed
46	Callum Coulter	GK	(England)	Frimley	24 October 2000 (aged 18)	0	0	Academy		Free transfer
Defenders
2	Ryan Jackson	RB	(England)	Streatham	31 July 1990 (aged 28)	95	4	(England) Gillingham	1 July 2017	Free transfer
3	Cohen Bramall	LB	(England)	Crewe	2 April 1996 (aged 23)	0	0	(England) Arsenal	2 August 2019	Free transfer
5	Luke Prosser (c)	CB	(England)	Enfield Town	28 May 1988 (aged 31)	74	3	(England) Southend United	22 June 2015	Free transfer
6	Omar Sowunmi	CB	(England)	Colchester	7 November 1995 (aged 23)	0	0	(England) Yeovil Town	1 July 2019	Undisclosed
12	Miles Welch-Hayes	DF	(England)	Oxford	25 October 1996 (aged 22)	0	0	(England) Macclesfield Town	21 February 2020	Free transfer
17	Cameron James	CB/FB/DM	(England)	Chelmsford	11 February 1998 (aged 21)	27	0	Academy	15 July 2015	Free transfer
18	Tom Eastman	CB	(England)	Colchester	21 October 1991 (aged 27)	315	17	(England) Ipswich Town	19 May 2011	Free transfer
19	Ollie Kensdale	CB/CM	(England)	Colchester	20 April 2000 (aged 19)	3	0	Academy	12 July 2016	Free transfer
21	Ryan Clampin	LB/LW	(England)	Colchester	29 January 1999 (aged 20)	1	0	Academy		Free transfer
36	Miquel Scarlett	RB/MF	(England)	Lambeth	27 September 2000 (aged 18)	0	0	(England) Gillingham		Free transfer
41	Danny Collinge	DF	(England)	Haywards Heath	9 April 1998 (aged 21)	0	0	(Germany) VfB Stuttgart	18 June 2019	Undisclosed
47	Luke Ige	RB	(England)		12 November 2000 (aged 18)	0	0	(England) Aston Villa	3 July 2019	Free transfer
48	Matthew Weaire	CB	(Denmark)	(England) Tunbridge Wells	20 August 2001 (aged 17)	0	0	(England) Brighton & Hove Albion	2 July 2019	Free transfer
53	Percy Kiangebeni	DF	(England)	Enfield Town	13 February 1997 (aged 22)	0	0	(England) St Albans City	1 February 2019	Free transfer
Midfielders
4	Tom Lapslie	CM	(England)	Waltham Forest	5 October 1995 (aged 23)	131	4	Academy	25 April 2013	Free transfer
8	Harry Pell	MF	(England)	Tilbury	21 October 1991 (aged 27)	34	7	(England) Cheltenham Town	10 May 2018	Undisclosed
10	Jevani Brown	MF	(Jamaica)	(England) Letchworth	16 October 1994 (aged 24)	0	0	(England) Cambridge United	4 July 2019	Undisclosed
14	Brandon Comley	MF	(Montserrat)	(England) Islington	18 November 1995 (aged 23)	55	1	(England) QPR	17 January 2018	Undisclosed
16	Diaz Wright	MF	(England)	Greenwich	22 February 1998 (aged 21)	14	0	Academy	30 June 2016	Free transfer
23	Louis Dunne	MF	(Republic of Ireland)	(England) Colchester	7 September 1998 (aged 20)	5	0	Academy	1 July 2015	Free transfer
24	Ben Stevenson	MF	(England)	Leicester	23 March 1997 (aged 22)	27	2	(England) Wolves	30 January 2019	Undisclosed
27	Noah Chilvers	AM	(England)	Chelmsford	22 February 2001 (aged 18)	2	0	Academy	3 July 2017	Free transfer
34	Dean Ager	AM	(England)	Chelmsford	27 October 1999 (aged 19)	0	0	Academy	12 July 2016	Free transfer
37	Andre Hasanally	MF	(England)	Waltham Forest	10 February 2002 (aged 17)	0	0	Academy		Free transfer
42	Sammie McLeod	MF	(England)	Tunbridge Wells	23 April 2000 (aged 19)	0	0	(England) Maldon & Tiptree	7 June 2019	Undisclosed
44	Tyrique Hyde	MF	(England)	Redbridge	8 April 1999 (aged 20)	0	0	(England) Dagenham & Redbridge	1 February 2019	Free transfer
49	Kwame Poku	MF	(Ghana)	(England) Croydon	11 August 2001 (aged 17)	0	0	(England) Worthing	17 May 2019	Undisclosed
50	Callum Anderson	MF	(England)		3 September 2000 (aged 18)	0	0	Academy		Free transfer
Forwards
7	Courtney Senior	WG	(England)	Croydon	30 June 1997 (aged 21)	66	10	(England) Brentford	28 June 2016	Free transfer
9	Luke Norris	CF	(England)	Stevenage	3 June 1993 (aged 25)	36	8	(England) Swindon Town	27 June 2018	Undisclosed
11	Paris Cowan-Hall	WG	(England)	Hillingdon	5 October 1990 (aged 28)	0	0	(England) Wycombe Wanderers	4 July 2019	Free transfer
15	Callum Harriott	WG	(Guyana)	(England) Norbury	4 March 1994 (aged 25)	23	7	(England) Reading	5 September 2019	Free transfer
26	Luke Gambin	WG	(Malta)	(England) Sutton	16 March 1993 (aged 26)	0	0	(England) Luton Town	26 June 2019	Free transfer
28	Ollie Sims	WG	(England)	Bury St Edmunds	29 March 2001 (aged 18)	0	0	Academy	3 July 2017	Free transfer
31	Tariq Issa	FW	(England)		2 September 1997 (aged 21)	4	0	Academy	15 July 2015	Free transfer
40	Michael Fernandes	WG	(England)	Hounslow	24 June 1999 (aged 19)	0	0	(England) Farnborough	1 July 2019	Undisclosed
43	Callum Jones	CF	(England)	Colchester	1999	0	0	Academy	12 July 2016	Free transfer
45	Frank Nouble	CF	(England)	Lewisham	24 September 1991 (aged 27)	46	9	(Wales) Newport County	8 June 2018	Free transfer

== Transfers and contracts ==
=== In ===
Date	Position	Nationality	Name	From	Fee	Ref.
17 May 2019	MF	(Ghana)	Kwame Poku	(England) Worthing	Undisclosed	(Note: Officially joined the club on 1 July 2019)
7 June 2019	MF	(England)	Sammie McLeod	(England) Maldon & Tiptree	Undisclosed	
18 June 2019	DF	(England)	Danny Collinge	(Germany) VfB Stuttgart	Free transfer	
26 June 2019	WG	(Malta)	Luke Gambin	(England) Luton Town	Free transfer	
1 July 2019	WG	(England)	Michael Fernandes	(England) Farnborough	Undisclosed	
1 July 2019	CB	(England)	Omar Sowunmi	(England) Yeovil Town	Undisclosed	
2 July 2019	CB	(Denmark)	Matthew Weaire	(England) Brighton & Hove Albion	Free transfer	
3 July 2019	RB	(England)	Luke Ige	(England) Aston Villa	Free transfer	
4 July 2019	MF	(Jamaica)	Jevani Brown	(England) Cambridge United	Undisclosed	
4 July 2019	WG	(England)	Paris Cowan-Hall	(England) Wycombe Wanderers	Free transfer	
13 July 2019	GK	(England)	Dean Gerken	(England) Ipswich Town	Free transfer	
2 August 2019	LB	(England)	Cohen Bramall	(England) Arsenal	Free transfer	
5 September 2019	WG	(Guyana)	Callum Harriott	(England) Reading	Free transfer	
21 February 2020	DF	(England)	Miles Welch-Hayes	(England) Macclesfield Town	Free transfer	

=== Out ===
Date	Position	Nationality	Name	To	Fee	Ref.
14 May 2019	DF	(England)	David Agboola	Free agent	Released	(Note: Officially left the club on 1 July 2019)
14 May 2019	FB	(England)	Aaron Barnes	(England) Dulwich Hamlet (Note: Following Aaron Barnes' release by Colchester United, he later signed for Dulwich Hamlet.)	Released	
14 May 2019	WG	(England)	George Brown	(England) East Thurrock United (Note: Following George Brown's release by Colchester United, he later signed for East Thurrock United.)	Released	
14 May 2019	ST	(England)	Ken Charles	(England) Enfield Town (Note: Following Ken Charles' release by Colchester United, he later signed for Enfield Town.)	Released	
14 May 2019	DF	(England)	Noah Chesmain	(England) Maidstone United (Note: Following Noah Chesmain's release by Colchester United, he signed a pre-contract agreement with Maidstone United.)	Released	
14 May 2019	CB	(England)	Chris Forino	(England) Wingate & Finchley (Note: Following Chris Forino's release by Colchester United, he later signed for Wingate & Finchley.)	Released	
14 May 2019	MF	(Kosovo)	Arjanit Krasniqi	(England) Billericay Town (Note: Following Arjanit Krasniqi's release by Colchester United, he later signed for Billericay Town.)	Released	
14 May 2019	CF	(England)	Eoin McKeown	(England) Kings Langley (Note: Following Eoin McKeown's release by Colchester United, he later signed for Kings Langley.)	Released	
14 May 2019	DF	(Republic of Ireland)	Paul Rooney	(England) Dover Athletic (Note: Following Paul Rooney's release by Colchester United, he signed a pre-contract agreement with Dover Athletic.)	Released	
14 May 2019	FW	(England)	Decarrey Sheriff	(England) Concord Rangers (Note: Following Decarrey Sheriff's release by Colchester United, he signed a pre-contract agreement with Concord Rangers.)	Released	
14 May 2019	MF	(Republic of Ireland)	Sam Warde	(Republic of Ireland) Sligo Rovers (Note: Following Sam Warde's release by Colchester United, he signed a pre-contract agreement with Sligo Rovers.)	Released	
14 May 2019	CB/RB	(England)	Will Wright	(England) Dagenham & Redbridge (Note: Following Will Wright's release by Colchester United, he signed a pre-contract agreement with Dagenham & Redbridge.)	Released	
20 May 2019	LW	(England)	Ryan Gondoh	(England) Carshalton Athletic (Note: Following Ryan Gondoh's release by Colchester United, he later signed for Carshalton Athletic.)	Released	
20 May 2019	CF	(France)	Mikael Mandron	(England) Gillingham (Note: Following Mikael Mandron's release by Colchester United, he later signed for Gillingham.)	Released	
30 May 2019	LWB/LW/FW	(England)	Brennan Dickenson	(England) Milton Keynes Dons	Free transfer	
21 June 2019	MF	(England)	Sam Saunders	Free agent	Retired	
22 June 2019	CB	(England)	Frankie Kent	(England) Peterborough United	Undisclosed	
28 June 2019	AM	(England)	Sammie Szmodics	(England) Bristol City	Undisclosed	
1 July 2019	GK	(Republic of Ireland)	Rene Gilmartin	(England) Bristol City	Free transfer	
19 July 2019	WG	(England)	Todd Miller	(England) Brighton & Hove Albion	Undisclosed	
22 July 2019	GK	(England)	Dillon Barnes	(England) Queens Park Rangers	Free transfer	
19 August 2019	LB/RB	(England)	Kane Vincent-Young	(England) Ipswich Town	Undisclosed	
5 February 2020	FW	(England)	Junior Ogedi-Uzokwe	(Israel) Hapoel Hadera	Undisclosed	

=== Loans in ===
Date	Position	Nationality	Name	From	End date	Ref.
28 August 2019	ST	(England)	Freddie Hinds	(England) Bristol City	January 2020	
29 August 2019	ST	(Jamaica)	Theo Robinson	(England) Southend United	End of season	
2 September 2019	MF	(England)	Brendan Sarpong-Wiredu	(England) Charlton Athletic	January 2020	
18 January 2020	DF	(England)	Tafari Moore	(England) Plymouth Argyle	End of season	

=== Loans out ===
Date	Position	Nationality	Name	To	End date	Ref.
11 June 2019	FW	(England)	Junior Ogedi-Uzokwe	(Northern Ireland) Derry City	19 November 2019	
11 October 2019	CB/CM	(England)	Ollie Kensdale	(England) Bath City	11 November 2019	
18 October 2019	AM	(England)	Noah Chilvers	(England) Bath City	18 November 2019	
8 November 2019	CB/FB/DM	(England)	Cameron James	(England) Maidstone United	8 December 2019	
10 November 2019	RB	(England)	Luke Ige	(England) Witham Town	8 December 2019	
10 November 2019	WG	(England)	Ollie Sims	(England) Bowers & Pitsea	8 December 2019	
7 December 2019	MF	(England)	Tyrique Hyde	(England) Dartford	End of season	
7 December 2019	MF	(England)	Diaz Wright	(England) Dagenham & Redbridge	January 2020	
4 January 2020	MF	(Jamaica)	Jevani Brown	(England) Forest Green Rovers	End of season	
6 January 2020	DF	(England)	Percy Kiangebeni	(England) Hendon	End of season	
10 January 2020	CB/FB/DM	(England)	Cameron James	(England) Welling United	April 2020	
10 January 2020	MF	(England)	Diaz Wright	(England) Welling United	April 2020	
25 January 2020	MF	(Republic of Ireland)	Louis Dunne	(England) Farnborough	End of season	

=== Contracts ===
New contracts and contract extensions.

Date	Position	Nationality	Name	Length	Expiry	Ref.
7 June 2019	MF	(England)	Sammie McLeod	2 years	June 2021	
11 June 2019	FW	(England)	Junior Ogedi-Uzokwe	1 year	June 2020	
13 June 2019	CB	(England)	Tom Eastman	2 years	June 2021	
18 June 2019	DF	(England)	Danny Collinge	2 years	June 2021	
26 June 2019	WG	(Malta)	Luke Gambin	2 years	June 2021	
1 July 2019	WG	(England)	Michael Fernandes	2 years	June 2021	
1 July 2019	CB	(England)	Omar Sowunmi	2 years	June 2021	
1 July 2019	MF	(England)	Diaz Wright	1 year	June 2020	
2 July 2019	CB	(Denmark)	Matthew Weaire	2 years	June 2021	
3 July 2019	RB	(England)	Luke Ige	1 year	June 2020	
4 July 2019	ST	(Jamaica)	Jevani Brown	2 years	June 2021	
4 July 2019	WG	(England)	Paris Cowan-Hall	2 years	June 2021	
2 August 2019	LB	(England)	Cohen Bramall	2 years	June 2021	
30 August 2019	MF	(England)	Andre Hasanally	3 years	June 2022	
30 August 2019	WG	(Guyana)	Callum Harriott	2 years	June 2021	
5 December 2019	MF	(Ghana)	Kwame Poku	2 1/2 years	June 2022	
21 February 2020	DF	(England)	Miles Welch-Hayes	2 1/2 years	June 2022	

== Match details ==
=== Preseason friendlies ===
Colchester United announced four pre-season fixtures on 24 May with games lined up at Dulwich Hamlet, Wealdstone and Dover Athletic, and a home fixture against Ipswich Town. A further fixture was added on 5 June with a game against Bowers & Pitsea, and then on 10 June, Charlton Athletic were named as Colchester's sixth pre-season opponents. Colchester scheduled a friendly against Welsh Premier League side Cefn Druids during pre-season trip to Wales for 13 July.

5 July 2019 Friendly	Bowers & Pitsea	0–2	Colchester United	Pitsea
19:30 BST		Report	Dunne 60'; Norris 85'	Stadium: Len Salmon Stadium

9 July 2019 Friendly	Dulwich Hamlet	0–2	Colchester United	East Dulwich
19:30 BST		Report	Senior 52'; Sowunmi 56'	Stadium: Champion Hill

13 July 2019 Friendly	(Wales) Cefn Druids	0–3	Colchester United	Rhosymedre
13:00 BST		Report	Hasanally 2'; Sowunmi 60'; Norris 90'	Stadium: The Rock

16 July 2019 Friendly	Wealdstone	0–3	Colchester United	Ruislip
19:30 BST		Report	Cowan-Hall 15'; Fernandes 65'; Gambin 78'	Stadium: Grosvenor Vale

19 July 2019 Friendly	Colchester United	0–5	Ipswich Town	Colchester
19:30 BST		Report	Norwood 17' (pen.), 62', 71'; Jackson 47', 73'	Stadium: Colchester Community Stadium

23 July 2019 Friendly	Colchester United	1–2	Charlton Athletic	Colchester
19:30 BST	Norris 49'	Report	Odoh 69'; Wiredu 90'	Stadium: Colchester Community Stadium

27 July 2019 Friendly	Dover Athletic	1–1	Colchester United	River
15:00 BST	Woods 43'	Report	Norris 89' (pen.)	Stadium: Crabble Athletic Ground

=== League Two ===
==== Results round by round ====
Round	1	2	3	4	5	6	7	8	9	10	11	12	13	14	15	16	17	18	19	20	21	22	23	24	25	26	27	28	29	30	31	32	33	34	35	36	37
Ground	H	A	H	A	H	A	H	A	A	H	A	H	A	H	A	H	A	A	H	A	H	A	H	H	A	A	H	H	A	H	A	H	H	A	A	H	A
Result	D	L	L	D	W	W	D	L	W	W	D	W	L	L	D	W	W	D	W	D	W	W	D	D	D	D	W	D	D	W	L	W	L	L	W	L	W
Position	12	19	21	21	17	13	13	17	13	10	9	8	8	11	12	9	8	10	8	9	8	4	6	6	8	9	8	7	5	5	6	5	5	7	6	8	6

Updated to match(es) played on 7 March 2020. Source: cu-fc.com
A = Away; H = Home; W = Win; D = Draw; L = Loss

==== League table ====
Pos	Team	Pld	W	D	L	GF	GA	GD	Pts	PPG	Promotion, qualification or relegation
2	Crewe Alexandra (P)	37	20	9	8	67	43	+24	69	1.86	Promotion to EFL League One
3	Plymouth Argyle (P)	37	20	8	9	61	39	+22	68	1.84	Promotion to EFL League One
4	Cheltenham Town	36	17	13	6	52	27	+25	64	1.78	Qualification for League Two play-offs (Note: Four teams play for one spot and promotion to EFL League One.)
5	Exeter City	37	18	11	8	53	43	+10	65	1.76	Qualification for League Two play-offs
6	Colchester United	37	15	13	9	52	37	+15	58	1.57	Qualification for League Two play-offs
7	Northampton Town (O, P)	37	17	7	13	54	40	+14	58	1.57	Qualification for League Two play-offs
8	Port Vale	37	14	15	8	50	44	+6	57	1.54	
9	Bradford City	37	14	12	11	44	40	+4	54	1.46	
10	Forest Green Rovers	36	13	10	13	43	40	+3	49	1.36	

Source: EFL Official Website
Rules for classification: 1) Points per game; 2) Goal difference; 3) Number of goals scored; 4) Head-to-head results; 5) Wins; 6) Away goals; 7) Penalty points (sec 9.5); 8) 12-point sending off offences
(O) Play-off winners; (P) Promoted

==== Matches ====
On 20 June 2019, the EFL League Two fixtures were revealed.

3 August 2019 1	Colchester United	1–1	Port Vale	Colchester
15:00 BST	Norris 45'	Report	Pope 5' (pen.)	Stadium: Colchester Community Stadium; Attendance: 3,729; Referee: Darren Drysdale

10 August 2019 2	Plymouth Argyle	1–0	Colchester United	Plymouth
15:00 BST	Sarcevic 57'	Report		Stadium: Home Park; Attendance: 10,542; Referee: John Busby

17 August 2019 3	Colchester United	1–2	Cambridge United	Colchester
15:00 BST	Norris 9' (pen.)	Report	Richards 54'; Darling 86'	Stadium: Colchester Community Stadium; Attendance: 4,148; Referee: Antony Coggins

20 August 2019 4	Grimsby Town	2–2	Colchester United	Cleethorpes
19:45 BST	Hanson 48' (pen.); Green 87'	Report	Nouble 25'; Norris 45+1'	Stadium: Blundell Park; Attendance: 4,103; Referee: Robert Lewis

24 August 2019 5	Colchester United	1–0	Northampton Town	Colchester
15:00 BST	Norris 66' (pen.)	Report		Stadium: Colchester Community Stadium; Attendance: 3,164; Referee: Ollie Yates

31 August 2019 6	Oldham Athletic	0–1	Colchester United	Oldham
15:00 BST		Report	Nouble 45'	Stadium: Boundary Park; Attendance: 3,091; Referee: Josh Smith

7 September 2019 7	Colchester United	0–0	Walsall	Colchester
15:00 BST		Report		Stadium: Colchester Community Stadium; Attendance: 3,265; Referee: Brett Huxtable

14 September 2019 8	Forest Green Rovers	1–0	Colchester United	Nailsworth
15:00 BST	Prosser 31' (o.g.)	Report		Stadium: The New Lawn; Attendance: 2,758; Referee: Will Finnie

17 September 2019 9	Swindon Town	0–3	Colchester United	Swindon
19:45 BST		Report	Eastman 45+1'; Robinson 55', 75'	Stadium: County Ground; Attendance: 6,634; Referee: Andy Woolmer

21 September 2019 10	Colchester United	2–1	Leyton Orient	Colchester
15:00 BST	Poku 3'; Jackson 28'	Report	Wilkinson 44'	Stadium: Colchester Community Stadium; Attendance: 5,519; Referee: Tom Nield

28 September 2019 11	Macclesfield Town	1–1	Colchester United	Macclesfield
15:00 BST	Osadebe 13'	Report	Robinson 45+1'	Stadium: Moss Rose; Attendance: 1,532; Referee: Christopher Pollard

5 October 2019 12	Colchester United	3–1	Stevenage	Colchester
15:00 BST	Eastman 48'; Nouble 82' (pen.); Poku 83'	Report	Cowley 17'	Stadium: Colchester Community Stadium; Attendance: 3,331; Referee: Nick Kinseley

12 October 2019 13	Crawley Town	2–1	Colchester United	Crawley
15:00 BST	Grego-Cox 55'; Bloomfield 80'	Report	Prosser 35'	Stadium: Broadfield Stadium; Attendance: 2,636; Referee: Martin Coy

19 October 2019 14	Colchester United	0–1	Morecambe	Colchester
15:00 BST		Report	Stockton 66'	Stadium: Colchester Community Stadium; Attendance: 3,011; Referee: Trevor Kettle

22 October 2019 15	Crewe Alexandra	0–0	Colchester United	Crewe
19:45 BST		Report	Robinson (red card) 90+5'	Stadium: Gresty Road; Attendance: 3,659; Referee: Andy Haines

26 October 2019 16	Colchester United	3–1	Newport County	Colchester
15:00 BST	Jackson 33'; Stevenson 42'; Senior 75'	Report	Abrahams 5'	Stadium: Colchester Community Stadium; Attendance: 2,955; Referee: James Oldham

2 November 2019 17	Mansfield Town	2–3	Colchester United	Mansfield
15:00 GMT	Sweeney 45'; Sterling-James 90'	Report	Comley 8'; Senior 74'; Gambin 87'	Stadium: Field Mill; Attendance: 4,125; Referee: Seb Stockbridge

16 November 2019	Colchester United	P–P	Bradford City	Colchester
15:00 GMT				Stadium: Colchester Community Stadium
Note: On 6 November, the match was postponed due to international call-ups.

23 November 2019 18	Cheltenham Town	1–1	Colchester United	Cheltenham
15:00 GMT	Thomas 70' (pen.)	Report	Norris 28'	Stadium: Whaddon Road; Attendance: 3,045; Referee: Ben Toner

7 December 2019 19	Colchester United	1–0	Salford City	Colchester
15:00 GMT	Pell 90+3'	Report		Stadium: Colchester Community Stadium; Attendance: 3,713; Referee: Josh Smith

14 December 2019 20	Scunthorpe United	2–2	Colchester United	Scunthorpe
15:00 GMT	Eisa 42' van Veen 47'	Report	Norris 58'; Prosser 62'	Stadium: Glanford Park; Attendance: 3,081; Referee: Ross Joyce

21 December 2019 21	Colchester United	3–0	Carlisle United	Colchester
15:00 GMT	Knight-Percival 26' (o.g.); Harriott 41'; Bramall 52'	Report		Stadium: Colchester Community Stadium; Attendance: 3,164; Referee: Craig Hicks

26 December 2019 22	Leyton Orient	1–3	Colchester United	Leyton
13:00 GMT	Sotiriou 86'	Report	Robinson 41', 90+1'; Pell 64'	Stadium: Brisbane Road; Attendance: 5,648; Referee: Nick Kinseley

29 December 2019 23	Colchester United	2–2	Exeter City	Colchester
15:00 GMT	Pell 16'; Robinson 59'; Lapslie (red card) 76'	Report	Taylor 8'; Bowman 77' (pen.)	Stadium: Colchester Community Stadium; Attendance: 4,739; Referee: Charles Breakspear

1 January 2020 24	Colchester United	1–1	Crawley Town	Colchester
15:00 GMT	Nouble 64'	Report	Prosser 72' (o.g.)	Stadium: Colchester Community Stadium; Attendance: 3,729; Referee: Antony Coggins

4 January 2020 25	Stevenage	0–0	Colchester United	Stevenage
15:00 GMT	Soares (red card) 19'	Report		Stadium: Broadhall Way; Attendance: 3,027; Referee: Ollie Yates

11 January 2020 26	Morecambe	1–1	Colchester United	Morecambe
15:00 GMT	Phillips 69'	Report	Nouble 35'; Jackson (yellow card) 75' (yellow-red card) 82'	Stadium: Globe Arena; Attendance: 1,593; Referee: Robert Lewis

18 January 2020 27	Colchester United	2–1	Macclesfield Town	Colchester
15:00 GMT	Harriott 14'; Kelleher 16' (o.g.)	Report	Stephens 72'	Stadium: Colchester Community Stadium; Attendance: 3,252; Referee: David Rock

21 January 2020 28	Colchester United	0–0	Bradford City	Colchester
19:45 GMT		Report		Stadium: Colchester Community Stadium; Attendance: 3,022; Referee: Trevor Kettle

25 January 2020 29	Exeter City	0–0	Colchester United	Exeter
15:00 GMT		Report		Stadium: St James Park; Attendance: 4,745; Referee: Darren Handley

28 January 2020 30	Colchester United	3–1	Swindon Town	Colchester
19:45 GMT	Norris 74'; Robinson 85', 89'	Report	Jaiyesimi 48'	Stadium: Colchester Community Stadium; Attendance: 3,258; Referee: Gavin Ward

1 February 2020 31	Cambridge United	2–1	Colchester United	Cambridge
15:00 GMT	Dallas 85'; Knibbs 86'	Report	Norris 67'	Stadium: Abbey Stadium; Attendance: 5,015; Referee: Brett Huxtable

8 February 2020 32	Colchester United	3–0	Plymouth Argyle	Colchester
15:00 GMT	Stevenson 14'; Robinson 30', 36'	Report		Stadium: Colchester Community Stadium; Attendance: 4,768; Referee: James Oldham

11 February 2020 33	Colchester United	2–3	Grimsby Town	Colchester
19:45 GMT	Prosser 17'; Robinson 42'	Report	Vernam 21', 66', 69'	Stadium: Colchester Community Stadium; Attendance: 2,954; Referee: Will Finnie

15 February 2020 34	Port Vale	3–0	Colchester United	Burslem
15:00 GMT	Conlon 14'; Cullen 54', 72'	Report		Stadium: Vale Park; Attendance: 5,199; Referee: Leigh Doughty

22 February 2020 35	Salford City	1–2	Colchester United	Salford
15:00 GMT	Hunter 43'	Report	Poku 27'; Harriott 41'	Stadium: Moor Lane; Attendance: 2,689; Referee: Andy Haines

29 February 2020 36	Colchester United	0–2	Cheltenham Town	Colchester
15:00 GMT	Sowunmi (yellow card) 76' (yellow-red card) 90+9'	Report	May 39'; Hussey 79'	Stadium: Colchester Community Stadium; Attendance: 3,698; Referee: Sam Purkiss

7 March 2020 37	Carlisle United	0–3	Colchester United	Carlisle
15:00 GMT		Report	Poku 41', 59'; Norris 43'	Stadium: Brunton Park; Attendance: 3,769; Referee: Thomas Bramall

14 March 2020	Colchester United	P–P	Scunthorpe United	Colchester
15:00 GMT				Stadium: Colchester Community Stadium
Note: Season suspended until 3 April 2020 due to the COVID-19 pandemic.

17 March 2020	Colchester United	P–P	Crewe Alexandra	Colchester
19:45 GMT				Stadium: Colchester Community Stadium
Note: Season suspended until 3 April 2020 due to the COVID-19 pandemic.

21 March 2020	Newport County	P–P	Colchester United	Newport
15:00 GMT				Stadium: Rodney Parade
Note: Season suspended until 3 April 2020 due to the COVID-19 pandemic.

28 March 2020	Colchester United	P–P	Mansfield Town	Colchester
15:00 GMT				Stadium: Colchester Community Stadium
Note: Season suspended until 3 April 2020 due to the COVID-19 pandemic.

4 April 2020	Bradford City	P–P	Colchester United	Bradford
15:00 BST				Stadium: Valley Parade
Note: On 3 April 2020, the English Football League postponed all football until safe to resume due to the COVID-19 pandemic.

10 April 2020	Northampton Town	P–P	Colchester United	Northampton
15:00 BST				Stadium: Sixfield Stadium
Note: On 3 April 2020, the English Football League postponed all football until safe to resume due to the COVID-19 pandemic.

13 April 2020	Colchester United	P–P	Oldham Athletic	Colchester
13:00 BST				Stadium: Colchester Community Stadium
Note: On 3 April 2020, the English Football League postponed all football until safe to resume due to the COVID-19 pandemic.

18 April 2020	Walsall	P–P	Colchester United	Walsall
15:00 BST				Stadium: Bescot Stadium
Note: On 3 April 2020, the English Football League postponed all football until safe to resume due to the COVID-19 pandemic.

25 April 2020	Colchester United	P–P	Forest Green Rovers	Colchester
15:00 BST				Stadium: Colchester Community Stadium
Note: On 3 April 2020, the English Football League postponed all football until safe to resume due to the COVID-19 pandemic.

==== Play-offs ====
18 June 2020 Semi-final first leg	Colchester United	1–0	Exeter City	Colchester
17:15 BST	Bramall 81'	Report		Stadium: Colchester Community Stadium; Referee: Josh Smith

22 June 2020 Semi-final second leg	Exeter City	3–1 (a.e.t.)	Colchester United	Exeter
17:15 BST	Martin 10'; Richardson 58'; Bowman 111'	Report	Senior 78'	Stadium: St James Park; Referee: Charles Breakspear
Note: Exeter City win 3–2 on aggregate

=== FA Cup ===
The first-round draw was made on 21 October 2019.

9 November 2019 First round	Colchester United	0–2	Coventry City	Colchester
15:00 GMT		Report	Shipley 11'; McCallum 27'	Stadium: Colchester Community Stadium; Attendance: 2,919; Referee: Chris Sarginson

=== EFL Cup ===
The first-round draw was made on 20 June. The second-round draw was made on 13 August 2019 following the conclusion of all but one first-round matches. The third-round draw was confirmed on 28 August 2019, live on Sky Sports. The draw for the fourth round was made on 25 September 2019. The quarter-final draw was conducted on 31 October, live on BBC Radio 2.

13 August 2019 First round	Colchester United	3–0	Swindon Town	Colchester
19:45 BST	Bramall (red card) 62'; Eastman 77'; Senior 90+2'; Comley 90+7'	Report	Yates (red card) 62'	Stadium: Colchester Community Stadium; Attendance: 1,595; Referee: Charles Breakspear

27 August 2019 Second round	Crystal Palace	0–0 (4–5 p)	Colchester United	Selhurst
19:45 BST		Report		Stadium: Selhurst Park; Referee: Andy Woolmer
	Penalties
	Townsend (penalty missed); Ayew (penalty scored); Benteke (penalty scored); Camarasa (penalty scored); Zaha (penalty scored)		Norris (penalty scored); Nouble (penalty scored); Brown (penalty scored); Cowan-Hall (penalty scored); Chilvers (penalty scored)

24 September 2019 Third round	Colchester United	0–0 (4–3 p)	Tottenham Hotspur	Colchester
19:45 BST		Report		Stadium: Colchester Community Stadium; Attendance: 9,481; Referee: Jarred Gillett
	Penalties
	Norris (penalty scored); Nouble (penalty scored); Brown (penalty missed); Cowan-Hall (penalty scored); Lapslie (penalty scored)		Eriksen (penalty missed); Alli (penalty scored); Lamela (penalty scored); Son (penalty scored); Lucas Moura (penalty missed)

29 October 2019 Fourth round	Crawley Town	1–3	Colchester United	Crawley
19:45 GMT	Bulman 20'	Report	Norris 22'; Luyambula 53' (o.g.); Gambin 79'	Stadium: Broadfield Stadium; Attendance: 5,612; Referee: Tony Harrington

18 December 2019 Quarter-final	Manchester United	3–0	Colchester United	Manchester
20:00 GMT	Rashford 51'; Jackson 56' (o.g.); Martial 61'	Report		Stadium: Old Trafford; Attendance: 57,559; Referee: David Coote

=== EFL Trophy ===
On 9 July 2019, the pre-determined group stage draw was announced with Invited clubs to be drawn on 12 July 2019. The draw for the second round was made on 16 November 2019 live on Sky Sports.

Pos	Div	Team	Pld	W	PW	PL	L	GF	GA	GD	Pts	Qualification
1	L2	Colchester United	3	2	0	1	0	5	3	+2	7	Advance to Round 2
2	L1	Ipswich Town	3	2	0	0	1	6	2	+4	6	Advance to Round 2
3	L1	Gillingham	3	1	0	0	2	4	7	−3	3	
4	ACA	Tottenham Hotspur U21	3	0	1	0	2	2	5	−3	2	

Source: EFL.com

3 September 2019 Group stage	Gillingham	2–3	Colchester United	Gillingham
19:45 BST	O'Keefe 23'; Mandron 78'	Report	Cowan-Hall 8', 63'; Robinson 55'	Stadium: Priestfield Stadium; Attendance: 1,055

8 October 2019 Group stage	Colchester United	1–1 (5–6 p)	Tottenham Hotspur U21	Colchester
19:30 BST	Norris 44'	Report	Oakley-Boothe 75'	Stadium: Colchester Community Stadium; Attendance: 1,061
	Penalties
	Norris (penalty missed); Brown (penalty scored); Robinson (penalty scored); Senior (penalty scored); Chilvers (penalty missed); Eastman (penalty scored); Jackson (penalty scored); Comley (penalty missed)		Binks (penalty scored); White (penalty missed); Shashoua (penalty scored); Patterson (penalty missed); Eyoma (penalty scored); Etete (penalty scored); Hinds (penalty scored); Walcott (penalty scored)

12 November 2019 Group stage	Colchester United	1–0	Ipswich Town	Colchester
19:30 GMT	Clampin 80'	Report		Stadium: Colchester Community Stadium; Attendance: 5,104

3 December 2019 Second round	Colchester United	1–2	Stevenage	Colchester
19:30 GMT	Stokes 61' (o.g.)	Report	Cowley 4' (pen.), 31'	Stadium: Colchester Community Stadium; Attendance: 959

== Squad statistics ==
=== Appearances and goals ===
As of 22 June 2020

No.	Pos	Nat	Player	Total		League Two		FA Cup		EFL Cup		EFL Trophy		Play-offs	
No.	Pos	Nat	Player	Apps	Goals	Apps	Goals	Apps	Goals	Apps	Goals	Apps	Goals	Apps	Goals
1	GK	(England) ENG	Dean Gerken	44	0	36	0	1	0	5	0	0	0	2	0
2	DF	(England) ENG	Ryan Jackson	45	2	33+1	2	1	0	5	0	1+2	0	2	0
3	DF	(England) ENG	Cohen Bramall	32	2	24	1	1	0	4	0	1	0	2	1
4	MF	(England) ENG	Tom Lapslie	26	0	7+10	0	0	0	3+1	0	2+1	0	0+2	0
5	DF	(England) ENG	Luke Prosser	45	3	35	3	1	0	5	0	2	0	2	0
6	DF	(England) ENG	Omar Sowunmi	11	0	5+2	0	0+1	0	0	0	3	0	0	0
7	FW	(England) ENG	Courtney Senior	40	4	19+10	2	1	0	3+1	1	3+1	0	1+1	1
8	MF	(England) ENG	Harry Pell	26	3	20+1	3	0	0	1	0	2	0	2	0
9	FW	(England) ENG	Luke Norris	42	11	19+13	9	0+1	0	4+1	1	2	1	2	0
10	MF	(Jamaica) JAM	Jevani Brown	17	0	5+6	0	0	0	1+2	0	3	0	0	0
11	FW	(England) ENG	Paris Cowan-Hall	10	2	2+3	0	0	0	0+2	0	1	2	0+2	0
12	DF	(England) ENG	Miles Welch-Hayes	1	0	0	0	0	0	0	0	0	0	0+1	0
14	MF	(Montserrat) MSR	Brandon Comley	33	2	22+2	1	1	0	4+1	1	2+1	0	0	0
15	FW	(Guyana) GUY	Callum Harriott	26	3	17+5	3	1	0	1+1	0	1	0	0	0
17	DF	(England) ENG	Cameron James	4	0	0+3	0	0	0	0	0	0+1	0	0	0
18	DF	(England) ENG	Tom Eastman	47	3	35+1	2	1	0	5	1	2+1	0	2	0
19	DF	(England) ENG	Ollie Kensdale	2	0	0+1	0	0	0	0	0	1	0	0	0
21	DF	(England) ENG	Ryan Clampin	17	1	13	0	0	0	1	0	3	1	0	0
24	MF	(England) ENG	Ben Stevenson	36	2	24+4	2	1	0	4+1	0	0	0	2	0
26	FW	(Malta) MLT	Luke Gambin	37	2	9+19	1	0+1	0	3+2	1	0+1	0	1+1	0
27	MF	(England) ENG	Noah Chilvers	3	0	0	0	0	0	0+1	0	2	0	0	0
29	GK	(England) ENG	Ethan Ross	5	0	1	0	0	0	0	0	4	0	0	0
37	MF	(England) ENG	Andre Hasanally	2	0	0+2	0	0	0	0	0	0	0	0	0
45	FW	(England) ENG	Frank Nouble	46	5	30+6	5	1	0	5	0	2	0	2	0
49	MF	(Ghana) GHA	Kwame Poku	38	5	23+6	5	1	0	1+1	0	3+1	0	2	0
Players who appeared for Colchester who left during the season
12	MF	(England) ENG	Brendan Sarpong-Wiredu	10	0	5+2	0	0	0	0	0	3	0	0	0
13	FW	(Jamaica) JAM	Theo Robinson	34	12	19+9	11	0	0	0	0	1+3	1	0+2	0
20	FW	(England) ENG	Junior Ogedi-Uzokwe	2	0	0+2	0	0	0	0	0	0	0	0	0
22	DF	(England) ENG	Tafari Moore	1	0	1	0	0	0	0	0	0	0	0	0
22	DF	(England) ENG	Kane Vincent-Young	2	0	2	0	0	0	0	0	0	0	0	0

=== Goalscorers ===
Place	Number	Nation	Position	Name	League Two	FA Cup	EFL Cup	EFL Trophy	Play-offs	Total
1	13	(Jamaica)	ST	Theo Robinson	11	0	0	1	0	12
2	9	(England)	CF	Luke Norris	9	0	1	1	0	11
3	45	(England)	CF	Frank Nouble	5	0	0	0	0	5
3	49	(Ghana)	MF	Kwame Poku	5	0	0	0	0	5
5	7	(England)	WG	Courtney Senior	2	0	1	0	1	4
6	5	(England)	CB	Luke Prosser	3	0	0	0	0	3
6	8	(England)	MF	Harry Pell	3	0	0	0	0	3
6	15	(Guyana)	WG	Callum Harriott	3	0	0	0	0	3
6	18	(England)	CB	Tom Eastman	2	0	1	0	0	3
10	2	(England)	RB	Ryan Jackson	2	0	0	0	0	2
10	3	(England)	LB	Cohen Bramall	1	0	0	0	1	2
10	11	(England)	WG	Paris Cowan-Hall	0	0	0	2	0	2
10	14	(Montserrat)	MF	Brandon Comley	1	0	1	0	0	2
10	24	(England)	MF	Ben Stevenson	2	0	0	0	0	2
10	26	(Malta)	WG	Luke Gambin	1	0	1	0	0	2
16	21	(England)	LB/LW	Ryan Clampin	0	0	0	1	0	1
				Own goals	2	0	1	1	0	4
				TOTALS	52	0	6	6	2	66

=== Disciplinary record ===
Number	Nationality	Position	Player	League Two		FA Cup		EFL Cup		EFL Trophy		Play-offs		Total	
Number	Nationality	Position	Player	Yellow card	Red card	Yellow card	Red card	Yellow card	Red card	Yellow card	Red card	Yellow card	Red card	Yellow card	Red card
8	(England)	MF	Harry Pell	8	0	0	0	1	0	1	0	1	0	11	0
14	(Montserrat)	MF	Brandon Comley	7	0	0	0	0	0	1	0	0	0	8	0
5	(England)	CB	Luke Prosser	6	0	0	0	1	0	0	0	0	0	7	0
18	(England)	CB	Tom Eastman	4	0	1	0	0	0	1	0	1	0	7	0
3	(England)	LB	Cohen Bramall	2	0	0	0	0	1	0	0	1	0	3	1
45	(England)	CF	Frank Nouble	5	0	0	0	1	0	0	0	0	0	6	0
2	(England)	RB	Ryan Jackson	1	1	1	0	0	0	0	0	0	0	2	1
4	(England)	MF	Tom Lapslie	2	1	0	0	0	0	0	0	0	0	2	1
6	(England)	CB	Omar Sowunmi	1	1	0	0	0	0	1	0	0	0	2	1
24	(England)	MF	Ben Stevenson	5	0	0	0	0	0	0	0	0	0	5	0
13	(Jamaica)	ST	Theo Robinson	1	1	0	0	0	0	0	0	0	0	1	1
15	(Guyana)	WG	Callum Harriott	3	0	0	0	1	0	0	0	0	0	4	0
1	(England)	GK	Dean Gerken	2	0	0	0	1	0	0	0	0	0	3	0
9	(England)	CF	Luke Norris	1	0	0	0	0	0	2	0	0	0	3	0
12	(England)	MF	Brendan Sarpong-Wiredu	2	0	0	0	0	0	1	0	0	0	3	0
21	(England)	LB/LW	Ryan Clampin	3	0	0	0	0	0	0	0	0	0	3	0
49	(Ghana)	MF	Kwame Poku	2	0	0	0	0	0	0	0	0	0	2	0
11	(England)	WG	Paris Cowan-Hall	0	0	0	0	1	0	0	0	0	0	1	0
26	(Malta)	WG	Luke Gambin	0	0	0	0	1	0	0	0	0	0	1	0
			TOTALS	54	4	2	0	6	1	7	0	3	0	72	5

=== Player debuts ===
Players making their first-team Colchester United debut in a fully competitive match.

Number	Position	Player	Date	Opponent	Ground	Notes
1	GK	(England) Dean Gerken	3 August 2019	Port Vale	Colchester Community Stadium	(Note: Second debut for the club.)
3	LB	(England) Cohen Bramall	3 August 2019	Port Vale	Colchester Community Stadium	
10	ST	(Jamaica) Jevani Brown	3 August 2019	Port Vale	Colchester Community Stadium	
26	WG	(Malta) Luke Gambin	3 August 2019	Port Vale	Colchester Community Stadium	
37	MF	(England) Andre Hasanally	3 August 2019	Port Vale	Colchester Community Stadium	
6	CB	(England) Omar Sowunmi	20 August 2019	Grimsby Town	Blundell Park	
11	WG	(England) Paris Cowan-Hall	24 August 2019	Northampton Town	Colchester Community Stadium	
13	ST	(Jamaica) Theo Robinson	31 August 2019	Oldham Athletic	Boundary Park	
12	MF	(England) Brendan Sarpong-Wiredu	3 September 2019	Gillingham	Priestfield Stadium	
49	MF	(Ghana) Kwame Poku	3 September 2019	Gillingham	Priestfield Stadium	
15	WG	(Guyana) Callum Harriott	19 October 2019	Morecambe	Colchester Community Stadium	
22	DF	(England) Tafari Moore	18 January 2020	Macclesfield Town	Colchester Community Stadium	
12	DF	(England) Miles Welch-Hayes	22 June 2020	Exeter City	St James Park	

== Honours and awards ==
=== End-of-season awards ===
Award	Player	Notes
Player of the Year award	(England) Tom Eastman	
Young Player of the Year award	(Ghana) Kwame Poku	
Player's Player of the Year award	(England) Tom Eastman	
Goal of the Season award	(Guyana) Callum Harriott	
Community Player of the Year award	(Guyana) Callum Harriott	
Colchester United Supporters Association Player of the Year award	(England) Tom Eastman	
Colchester United Supporters Association Away Player of the Year award	(England) Tom Eastman	

== See also ==
- List of Colchester United F.C. seasons
