= Mehdi El Moutacim =

Finnish footballer (born 2000)

Personal information
- Date of birth: 4 August 2000 (age 26)
- Place of birth: Espoo, Finland
- Height: 1.85 m (6 ft 1 in)
- Position: Goalkeeper

Youth career
- EIF

Senior career*
Years	Team	Apps	(Gls)
2018–2019	EIF	31	(0)
2020	SJK	0	(0)
2020	→ SJK Akatemia (loan)	15	(0)
2021–2022	EIF	35	(0)
- * Club domestic league appearances and goals

Mehdi El Moutacim (born 4 August 2000) is a Finnish former professional footballer who played as a goalkeeper.

== Early life ==
El Moutacim was born in Espoo, but moved to Ekenäs at the age of five. He later joined the EIF youth system when he was seven.

== Club career ==
In 2017, El Moutacim spent time with both the under-17 squad and their reserve team, EIF Akademi. After making nine appearances on the bench as an unused substitute for the first team between 2015 and 2017, he signed his first professional contract with the club ahead of the 2018 Ykkönen season. He made his debut on 6 March 2018 during their Finnish Cup group stage victory over Honka Akatemia at home, playing the full 90 minutes and keeping a clean sheet. That year he appeared between the sticks in five league matches before becoming the full-time starter in 2019, playing in 26 of 27 games.

He signed with Veikkausliiga club SJK in December 2019. Two months later he made his club debut, playing the full 90 minutes of a 2–3 defeat to Lahti in the Finnish Cup group stage. However, the signing of Finland national team keeper Walter Viitala turned him into the third-stringer at the position. He started the 2020 season with SJK Akatemia in Ykkönen, and in his first match with the reserves on 27 June he allowed three goals in a 0–3 defeat to his childhood team EIF.

In 2021, he received another contract extension with EIF.

== Personal life ==
He is of Moroccan descent through his father.
