= Tafari Moore =

English footballer

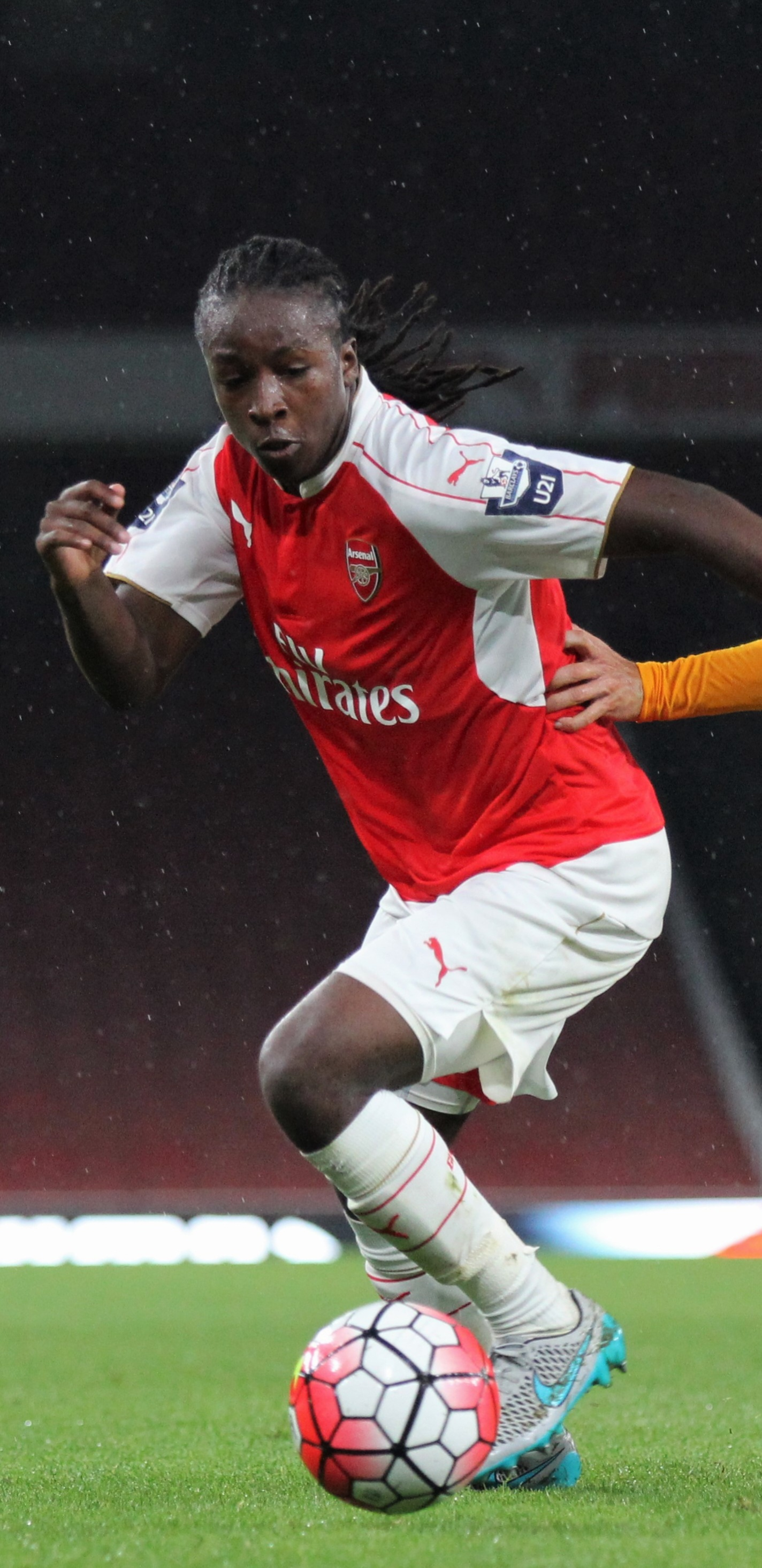
- Moore playing for Arsenal U-21 in 2015

Personal information
- Full name: Tafari Lalibela Moore
- Date of birth: 5 July 1997 (age 29)
- Place of birth: Kilburn, England
- Height: 1.73 m (5 ft 8 in)
- Position: Full-back

Youth career
- 2005–2009: Queens Park Rangers
- 2009–2015: Arsenal

Senior career*
Years	Team	Apps	(Gls)
2015–2018	Arsenal	0	(0)
2016–2017	→ Utrecht (loan)	1	(0)
2016–2017	→ Jong Utrecht (loan)	26	(0)
2018	→ Wycombe Wanderers (loan)	13	(0)
2018–2020	Plymouth Argyle	14	(0)
2020	→ Colchester United (loan)	1	(0)
2021–2022	Hendon	36	(0)
2022–2023	St Albans City	45	(4)
2023–2024	Oxford City	26	(0)
2024–2025	St Albans City	14	(0)

International career^{‡}
2012–2013	England U16	6	(0)
2013–2014	England U17	12	(0)
2014	England U18	2	(0)
2015–2016	England U19	5	(0)
2016–2018	England U20	6	(0)
- * Club domestic league appearances and goals as of 16:04, 1 May 2025 (UTC) ‡ National team caps and goals as of 9:59, 28 June 2018 (UTC)

Tafari Lalibela Moore (born 5 July 1997) is an English professional footballer who plays as a full-back. Moore joined Queen Park Rangers academy when he was eight years old and came through the Arsenal academy, and has been involved with the England under-20.

== Club career ==
=== Arsenal ===
He joined Queens Park Rangers as an under-nine, and moved on to Arsenal at the age of twelve. Moore signed his first professional contract with Arsenal on 5 July 2014, his 17th birthday. He was a member of Arsenal's under-21 team that beat Aston Villa in the 2015–16 Professional U21 Development League play-off final to gain promotion to the top division.

==== Loans ====
On 17 August 2016, he was sent on a season-long loan to Eredivisie club Utrecht. Five days later he made his professional debut for Jong Utrecht in the Eerste Divisie. Moore played in his first match for the senior team on 16 September in a 5–1 defeat at home to Groningen.

On 12 January 2018, he was sent on loan to League Two club Wycombe Wanderers until the end of the 2017–18 season. At the end of the season, he was released by the Gunners.

=== Plymouth Argyle ===
On 28 June 2018, he joined Plymouth Argyle. Moore started games early in the season but produced some disappointing performances and did not play again in the 2018–19 season after November. Moore played twice in cup games at the start of the following season before being listed for loan in October. On 9 January 2020, it was announced that the Pilgrims had offered Moore a settlement to terminate his contract. Later that month, he joined Colchester United on loan until the end of the season, but only made one appearance. Moore was released by Plymouth at the end of the season. In October 2020 he played for Salford City's development team in The Central League.

=== Non-league ===
Moore joined Hendon in September 2021.

In June 2022, Moore made the step up to join National League South club St Albans City. Moore was awarded the National League South Player of the Month award for November 2022.

On 7 July 2023, Moore join Oxford City. On 17 August 2024, he return to St Albans City. Moore later released by St Albans City at the end of season following relegation from National League South.

== International career ==
He has played a youth international for England, and was an instrumental member of the English side that won the 2014 UEFA European Under-17 Championship. As so he was also named in UEFA's team of the tournament. On 20 July 2016, he was called up to the England Under-19 squad for the 2016 UEFA European Under-19 Championship in Germany. England eventually got to the semifinals of the Euros, where they went out by 2–1 to Italy.

== Personal life ==
Born in the Kilburn, Brent, London to Jamaican father and a Jamaican-Barbadian mother. His older sister, Makeda Moore is a reggae singer and formerly touring member for Clean Bandit from 2012 to 2013 and Kandaka Moore, also singer and dancer, and featured as guest singer alongside with Nikki Cislyn on Clean Bandit song "A+E", Kandaka Moore also featured as dancer for Clean Bandit music video "Tears". Tafari Moore himself was featured in the Clean Bandit music video "Nightingale" while he at the Arsenal academy. He is a devout Rastafarian who often credits God in interviews and has large dreadlocks in the custom of his faith.

== Career statistics ==
As of match played 27 January 2022

Appearances and goals by club, season and competition
Club	Season	League			FA Cup		League Cup		Other		Total	
Club	Season	Division	Apps	Goals	Apps	Goals	Apps	Goals	Apps	Goals	Apps	Goals
Arsenal	2015–16	Premier League	0	0	0	0	0	0	—		0	0
Arsenal	2016–17	Premier League	0	0	0	0	0	0	—		0	0
Arsenal	2017–18	Premier League	0	0	0	0	0	0	—		0	0
Arsenal	Total		0	0	0	0	0	0	—		0	0
Jong Utrecht (loan)	2016–17	Eerste Divisie	26	0	0	0	—		—		26	0
Utrecht (loan)	2016–17	Eredivisie	1	0	0	0	—		—		1	0
Wycombe Wanderers (loan)	2017–18	League Two	13	0	0	0	0	0	0	0	13	0
Plymouth Argyle	2018–19	League One	14	0	1	0	1	0	2 (Note: Appearance in the EFL Trophy)	0	18	0
Plymouth Argyle	2019–20	League Two	0	0	0	0	1	0	1	0	2	0
Plymouth Argyle	Total		14	0	1	0	2	0	3	0	20	0
Colchester United (loan)	2019–20	League Two	1	0	0	0	0	0	0	0	1	0
Hendon	2021–22	SFL Premier Division South	15	0	0	0	0	0	0	2	17	0
Career total			70	0	1	0	2	0	5	0	78	0

== Honours ==
Arsenal

- Professional Development League: U21s Playoff Winner-2016

England

- UEFA European Under-17 Championship: 2014
- UEFA European Under-19 Championship: 2016 Semifinalist

Individual

- 2014 UEFA European Under-17 Championship: Team of the Tournament
- National League South Player of the Month: November 2022
