= Andre Hasanally =

English footballer

Personal information
- Full name: Andre Christopher Hasanally
- Date of birth: 10 February 2002 (age 24)
- Place of birth: Waltham Forest, England
- Height: 5 ft 6 in (1.67 m)
- Position: Midfielder

Team information
- Current team: Felixstowe & Walton United

Youth career
- 2013–2019: Colchester United

Senior career*
Years	Team	Apps	(Gls)
2019–2022	Colchester United	2	(0)
2020	→ Maldon & Tiptree (loan)	2	(0)
2022	→ Felixstowe & Walton United (loan)	13	(3)
2022	St Neots Town	13	(2)
2022–2023	Felixstowe & Walton United	23	(0)
2023–2024	Maldon & Tiptree	21	(2)
2024–	Felixstowe & Walton United	0	(0)
- * Club domestic league appearances and goals as of 14:57, 1 March 2024 (UTC)

Andre Christopher Hasanally (born 10 February 2002) is an English professional footballer who plays as a midfielder for Isthmian League North Division club Felixstowe & Walton United.

Hasanally is a product of the Colchester United Academy having been at the Essex club from the age of eleven. He made his professional debut for Colchester in August 2019. He made appearances for Maldon & Tiptree on loan during the 2020–21 season and was loaned to Felixstowe & Walton United in the 2021-22 season.

== Career ==
Born in Waltham Forest, London, Hasanally joined the Academy at Colchester United in 2013 at the age of eleven years old.

Hasanally made his professional debut for Colchester on 3 August 2019, coming on as a substitute for Courtney Senior in the 82nd-minute of Colchester's 1–1 League Two draw with Port Vale.

Hasanally signed his first professional contract on 30 August 2019, agreeing a three-year deal until June 2022.

For the 2020–21 season, Hasanally made appearances on loan for Maldon & Tiptree. He made his debut on 6 October in the Jammers' 1–0 win against Canvey Island.

Having not played all season for Colchester in the 2021–22 season, he was loaned out in February 2022 to Isthmian League North Division side Felixstowe & Walton United on loan until the end of the campaign, helping the club into the play-off semi-finals. He was released by Colchester at the end of the season.

On 22 July 2022, Hasanally joined Northern Premier League Division One Midlands club St Neots Town. In November 2022, he returned to Felixstowe & Walton United on a permanent basis having previously spent time with the club on loan. Having joined Maldon & Tiptree ahead of the 2023–24 season, Hasanally returned to second-placed Felixstowe & Walton United in February 2024.

== Career statistics ==
As of match played 27 February 2024

Appearances and goals by club, season and competition
Club	Season	League			FA Cup		League Cup		Other		Total	
Club	Season	Division	Apps	Goals	Apps	Goals	Apps	Goals	Apps	Goals	Apps	Goals
Colchester United	2019–20	League Two	2	0	0	0	0	0	0	0	2	0
Colchester United	2020–21	League Two	0	0	—		0	0	0	0	0	0
Colchester United	2021–22	League Two	0	0	0	0	0	0	0	0	0	0
Colchester United	Total		2	0	0	0	0	0	0	0	2	0
Maldon & Tiptree (loan)	2020–21	Isthmian League North Division	2	0	3	1	—		3 (Note: Appearances in FA Trophy)	1	8	2
Felixstowe & Walton United (loan)	2021–22	Isthmian League North Division	13	3	—		—		2 (Note: One appearance in Suffolk Senior Cup, one in Isthmian League North Division play-offs)	0	15	3
St Neots Town	2022–23	Northern Premier League Division One Midlands	12	2	3	0	—		2 (Note: One appearance in FA Trophy and one appearance in Huntingdonshire Senior Cup)	0	17	2
Felixstowe & Walton United	2022–23	Isthmian League North Division	23	0	—		—		1 (Note: Appearance(s) in Suffolk Senior Cup)	0	24	0
Maldon & Tiptree	2023–24	Isthmian League North Division	21	2	4	0	—		5 (Note: One appearance in FA Trophy, one appearance in Alan Turvey Trophy, three appearances in Essex Senior Cup)	0	30	2
Career total			73	7	10	1	0	0	13	1	96	9
