= Serge Atakayi =

Congolese footballer

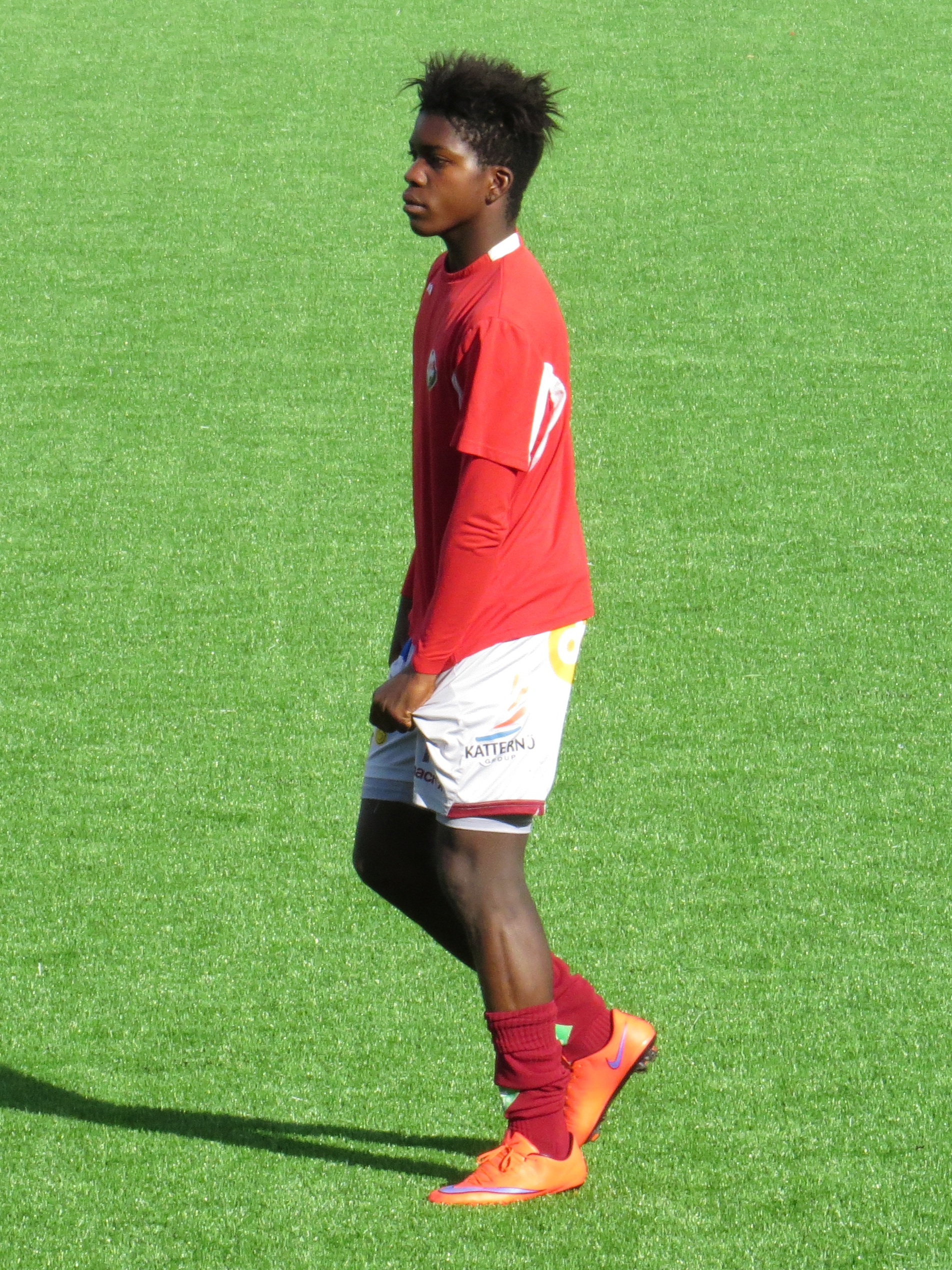

Personal information
- Full name: Serge Atakayi
- Date of birth: 30 January 1999 (age 27)
- Place of birth: Kinshasa, DR Congo
- Position: Winger

Team information
- Current team: GBK

Youth career
- –2013: Oravais IF
- 2013–2015: Jaro

Senior career*
Years	Team	Apps	(Gls)
2015–2016	Jaro	29	(3)
2015	→ JBK	10	(2)
2016–2019	Rangers	1	(0)
2019	→ SJK (loan)	10	(1)
2020–2022	SJK	28	(1)
2021	→ TPS (loan)	13	(3)
2022–2023	St Patrick's Athletic	23	(4)
2023	→ Waterford (loan)	12	(0)
2024	KTP	1	(0)
2025	KPV	25	(5)
2026	MP	18	(1)
2026–	GBK	3	(1)

International career^{‡}
2014	Finland U15	2	(0)
2015	Finland U17		
2016	Finland U18	5	(2)
2016–2018	Finland U19	11	(0)
2019	DR Congo U23	2	(0)
2020	Finland U21	2	(0)
- * Club domestic league appearances and goals as of 19:22, 13 November 2026 (UTC) ‡ National team caps and goals as of 14:02, 26 October 2022 (UTC)

Serge Atakayi (born 30 January 1999) is a professional footballer who plays as a winger for GBK Kokkola. Originally from the DR Congo, he represented Finland up to the under-19 level before representing DR Congo at under-23 level and then switching back to Finland at under-21 level a year later. He applied for asylum in Finland in 2010 and later became the youngest goalscorer in the history of the Finnish top flight when he scored for FF Jaro in May 2015.

== Early life ==
Atakayi, originally from Democratic Republic of the Congo, applied for asylum in Finland alongside other members of his youth football team when visiting the country in 2010.

== Club career ==
=== FF Jaro ===
Atakayi joined the youth system at FF Jaro from Oravais IF in 2013 and made his senior debut for the club in 2015. He became the youngest goalscorer in the history of the Finnish top flight when he scored against HIFK on 17 May 2015, aged 16 years and 107 days.

=== Rangers ===
On 31 August 2016, after trial periods with Leicester City and Fulham, he joined Rangers on a three-year contract. He signed a one-year contract extension to tie him to Rangers until 2020 in June 2018. He made his debut against Motherwell in a 7–1 win during November 2018 but suffered a broken ankle in the game.

=== SJK ===
Atakayi left Rangers on 30 December 2019 to join Finnish side SJK for a reported fee of £100,000. Atakayi played in 19 games on the 2020 season and scored once. On 4 June 2021 it was told by SJK-head coach Jani Honkavaara that Atakayi had not been training with the team since February because of attitude problems. Atakayi only played in one Finnish Cup game for SJK in the 2021 season. On 28 July 2021 he moved to TPS on loan.

=== St Patrick's Athletic ===
On 15 July 2022 it was announced that Atakayi had signed for League of Ireland Premier Division club St Patrick's Athletic on an 18-month contract for an undisclosed fee. He made his debut on the same day, in a 1–1 draw with Dundalk at Richmond Park. His first goal for the club came on 4 August 2022 when he scored an 87th-minute winner away to CSKA Sofia in the UEFA Europa Conference League Third qualifying round. On 14 August 2022, he scored the winning goal against Sligo Rovers at Richmond Park in what was his first league start for the club. On 19 August 2022, he scored the winning goal in a 2–1 victory away to UCD, his third goal in his last four games. On 14 October 2022, he opened the scoring in a 3–1 win over Dublin rivals Bohemians. He followed that up a week later by again opening the scoring in another Dublin derby, this time away to Shamrock Rovers at Tallaght Stadium. In December 2023, it was announced that Atakayi had been released by the club at the end of his contract, following his loan spell with Waterford.

==== Waterford loan ====
On 1 July 2023, Atakayi signed for League of Ireland First Division side Waterford on loan until the end of the season. He made 14 appearances in all competitions as his side earned promotion back to the League of Ireland Premier Division via the playoffs.

=== KTP ===
On 25 August 2024, Atakayi signed with Kotkan Työväen Palloilijat (KTP) in Finnish second-tier Ykkösliiga. He made one appearance before the end of the season, as they won the 2024 Ykkösliiga to gain promotion to the Veikkausliiga.

=== KPV ===
On 28 February 2025, Atakayi signed for Ykkönen side Kokkolan Palloveikot (KPV) for the 2025 season.

=== Mikkelin Palloilijat ===
Atakayi signed for Ykkösliiga side Mikkelin Palloilijat ahead of the 2026 season.

=== GBK Kokkola ===
On 1 September 2026, he moved to Kakkonen side GBK Kokkola.

== International career ==
=== Finland ===
Atakayi was born in DR Congo but obtained Finnish citizenship in 2016 and represented Finland at under-15 level. In June 2016, Atakayi represented Finland at under-18 level in the Baltic Cup and scored in a 2–2 draw with Lithuania on 2 June 2016. He made his debut for the Finland under-19 side on 4 September 2016, in a goalless draw with Romania.

=== DR Congo ===
While living in Glasgow, Atakayi become close friends with compatriot Youssouf Mulumbu who was playing for Celtic at the time and was a senior international for DR Congo. Mulumbu spoke with Atakayi about changing his international allegiance to his birth country. In March 2019, Atakayi was called up to the DR Congo U23 team for two 2019 Africa U-23 Cup of Nations qualification fixtures against Morocco U23. The first leg at home in Kinshasa represented a first opportunity for Atakayi to return home to see his family since seeking asylum from the country in 2010.

=== Return to Finland ===
Atakayi returned to representing Finland in 2020, playing in 2 UEFA European Under-21 Championship qualifiers for the Finland U21 side.

== Career statistics ==
As of match played on 24 October 2026

Club	Season	League			Cup (Note: Includes Finnish Cup, Scottish Cup, FAI Cup)		League cup (Note: Includes Finnish League Cup, Scottish League Cup)		Europe		Other		Total	
Club	Season	Division	Apps	Goals	Apps	Goals	Apps	Goals	Apps	Goals	Apps	Goals	Apps	Goals
FF Jaro	2015	Veikkausliiga	16	2	0	0	4	0	—		—		20	2
FF Jaro	2016	Ykkönen	13	1	0	0	0	0	—		—		13	1
FF Jaro	Total		29	3	0	0	4	0	—		—		33	3
JBK	2015	Kakkonen	10	2	0	0	0	0	—		—		10	2
Rangers	2016–17	Scottish Premiership	0	0	0	0	0	0	—		0	0	0	0
Rangers	2017–18	Scottish Premiership	0	0	0	0	0	0	0	0	1 (Note: Appearance(s) in Scottish Challenge Cup for Rangers B)	0	1	0
Rangers	2018–19	Scottish Premiership	1	0	0	0	0	0	0	0	1	0	2	0
Rangers	2019–20	Scottish Premiership	0	0	0	0	0	0	0	0	3	1	3	1
Rangers	Total		1	0	0	0	0	0	0	0	5	1	6	1
SJK (loan)	2019	Veikkausliiga	10	1	0	0	—		—		—		10	1
SJK	2020	Veikkausliiga	19	1	5	0	—		—		—		24	1
SJK	2021	Veikkausliiga	0	0	1	0	—		—		—		1	0
SJK	2022	Veikkausliiga	9	0	2	0	5	0	0	0	—		16	0
SJK	Total		38	2	8	0	5	0	0	0	—		51	2
TPS (loan)	2021	Ykkönen	13	3	0	0	—		—		—		13	3
St Patrick's Athletic	2022	LOI Premier Division	13	4	1	0	—		3 (Note: Appearances in UEFA Europa Conference League)	1	—		17	5
St Patrick's Athletic	2023	LOI Premier Division	10	0	—		—		—		0 (Note: Appearances in the Leinster Senior Cup)	0	10	0
St Patrick's Athletic	Total		23	4	1	0	—		3	1	0	0	27	5
Waterford (loan)	2023	LOI First Division	12	0	2	0	—		–		0	0	14	0
KTP	2024	Ykkösliiga	1	0	—		—		—		–		1	0
KPV	2025	Ykkönen	25	5	4	0	—		—		—		29	5
Mikkelin	2026	Ykkösliiga	18	1	3	1	1	0	—		—		22	2
GBK Kokkola	2026	Kakkonen	3	1	—		—		—		4 (Note: Appearances in the 2026 Kakkoen Playoffs)	1	7	2
Career total			173	21	18	1	10	0	3	1	9	2	213	25

== Honours ==
KTP

- Ykkösliiga: 2024
