= Joonas Lepistö =

Finnish footballer (born 1998)

Personal information
- Date of birth: 22 June 1998 (age 28)
- Place of birth: Seinäjoki, Finland
- Height: 1.90 m (6 ft 3 in)
- Position: Striker

Senior career*
Years	Team	Apps	(Gls)
2015–2019	SJK Akatemia	51	(34)
2019–2021	SJK	37	(6)
2022	Inter Turku	15	(0)
2024–	POHU	12	(17)
- * Club domestic league appearances and goals as of 16 October 2022

Joonas Lepistö (born 22 June 1998) is a Finnish professional footballer who plays as a striker.

== Club career ==
On 7 December 2021, he signed a two-year contract with Inter Turku. The contract was terminated by mutual consent on 12 January 2023.
