= Aatu Kujanpää =

Finnish footballer (born 1998)

Personal information
- Date of birth: 27 July 1998 (age 28)
- Place of birth: Lapua, Finland
- Height: 1.85 m (6 ft 1 in)
- Position: Midfielder

Team information
- Current team: Panargiakos

Youth career
- Lapuan Ponnistus

Senior career*
Years	Team	Apps	(Gls)
2015–2017	SJK	1	(0)
2015–2017	SJK II	45	(27)
2018–2019	VPS	4	(0)
2020	SJK	0	(0)
2020	SJK II	15	(0)
2021–2023	HIFK	53	(2)
2024	KäPa	0	(0)
2024	JäPS	3	(0)
2024–	Panargiakos	4	(0)
- * Club domestic league appearances and goals as of 24 November 2024

Aatu Kujanpää (born 27 July 1998) is a Finnish professional footballer who plays as a midfielder for Panargiakos club in the Super League Greece 2.

== Club career ==
He returned to SJK for the 2020 season. On 13 November he left the club.

On 8 March 2021, he signed a contract with HIFK for the 2021 season. The contract was extended for the 2022 season.

After a short stint with Järvenpään Palloseura (JäPS) in second-tier Ykkösliiga, Kujanpää signed with Greek club Panargiakos in Super League Greece 2.

== Career statistics ==
As of 24 November 2024.

Appearances and goals by club, season and competition
Club	Season	League			Cup (Note: Includes Suomen Cup and Greek Cup)		League cup (Note: Includes Finnish League Cup, Ykköscup and Ykkösliigacup)		Other		Total	
Club	Season	Division	Apps	Goals	Apps	Goals	Apps	Goals	Apps	Goals	Apps	Goals
SJK Akatemia	2015	Kakkonen	4	0	–		–		–		4	0
SJK Akatemia	2016	Kolmonen	22	11	–		–		2 (Note: Appearances in UEFA Regions' Cup)	0	24	11
SJK Akatemia	2017	Kolmonen	19	16	9	6	–		4	3	32	25
SJK Akatemia	Total		45	27	9	6	0	0	6	3	60	36
SJK	2016	Veikkausliiga	0	0	0	0	2	0	–		2	0
SJK	2017	Veikkausliiga	1	0	0	0	–		–		1	0
SJK	Total		1	0	0	0	2	0	0	0	3	0
VPS	2018	Veikkausliiga	0	0	3	1	–		–		3	1
VPS	2019	Veikkausliiga	4	0	0	0	–		–		4	0
VPS	Total		4	0	3	1	0	0	0	0	7	1
SJK	2020	Veikkausliiga	0	0	3	0	–		–		3	0
SJK Akatemia	2020	Ykkönen	15	0	–		–		–		15	0
HIFK	2021	Veikkausliiga	21	0	0	0	–		–		21	0
HIFK	2022	Veikkausliiga	17	1	5	3	4	1	–		26	5
HIFK	2023	Ykkönen	15	1	1	0	0	0	–		16	1
HIFK	Total		53	2	6	3	4	1	0	0	63	6
KäPa	2024	Ykkösliiga	0	0	0	0	1	0	–		1	0
JäPS	2024	Ykkösliiga	3	0	0	0	–		–		3	0
Panargiakos	2024–25	Super League Greece 2	4	0	3	0	–		–		7	0
Career total			125	29	24	10	7	1	6	3	162	43
