= Tero Mäntylä =

Finnish footballer (born 1991)

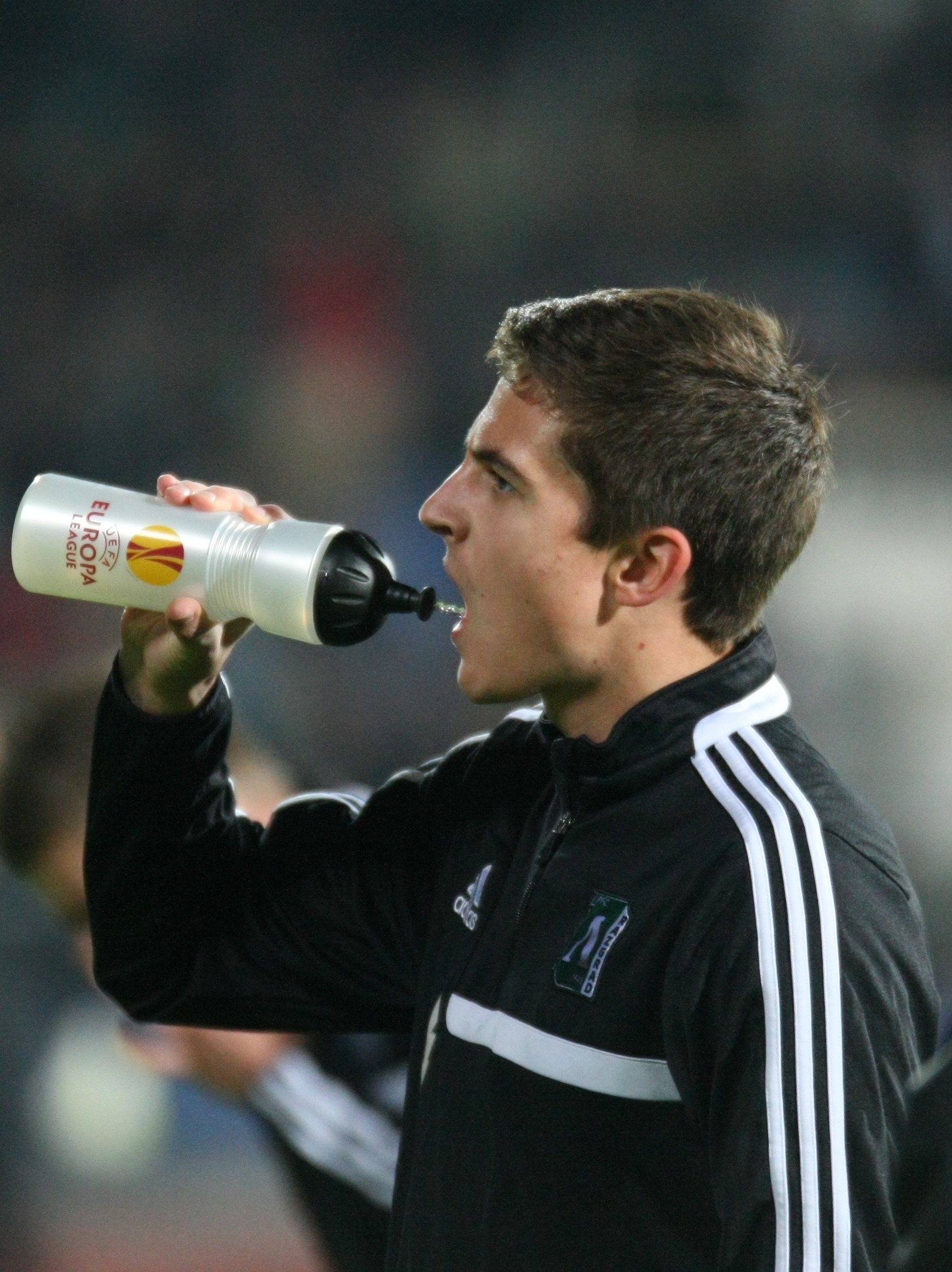
- Mäntylä with Ludogorets in 2014

Personal information
- Date of birth: 18 April 1991 (age 35)
- Place of birth: Seinäjoki, Finland
- Height: 1.85 m (6 ft 1 in)
- Position: Centre back

Youth career
- TP-Seinäjoki

Senior career*
Years	Team	Apps	(Gls)
2007	TP-Seinäjoki	24	(0)
2008	SJK	1	(0)
2008–2010	Portsmouth	0	(0)
2010–2011	Inter Turku	33	(0)
2012–2014	Ludogorets Razgrad	27	(0)
2014–2017	Aalesund	19	(0)
2017–2018	Inter Turku	38	(0)
2019	HIFK	23	(0)
2020–2021	SJK	26	(0)

International career^{‡}
2010–2012	Finland U-21	12	(1)
2014	Finland	2	(0)
- * Club domestic league appearances and goals as of 5 October 2021 (UTC) ‡ National team caps and goals as of 25 June 2014 (UTC)

Tero Mäntylä (born 18 April 1991) is a Finnish footballer who most lately played as a defender for SJK.

== Career ==
A product of his local club TP-Seinäjoki, Mäntylä joined Premier League club Portsmouth in February 2008, only at the age of 16, signing a three-year contract.

However, during his time in England, he never got any chance to prove his merit and only managed to play in two reserve league matches. After his link with Portsmouth expired, he signed with Inter Turku in August 2010. After the 2011 season his contract with Inter expired, and he signed a two-and-a-half-year contract with Ludogorets. Mäntylä left the team from Razgrad in the summer of 2014 and moved to Scandinavia and Aalesund. He made his debut in the national team in Helsinki in a friendly game against Czech Republic on 21 May 2014 (2−2).

== Career statistics ==
As of 15 May 2024

Club	Season	Division	League		Cup		Europe		Total	
Club	Season	Division	Apps	Goals	Apps	Goals	Apps	Goals	Apps	Goals
TP-Seinäjoki	2007	Kakkonen	24	0	—		—		24	0
SJK	2008	Kakkonen	1	0	—		—		1	0
Inter Turku	2010	Veikkausliiga	9	0	0	0	0	0	9	0
Inter Turku	2011	Veikkausliiga	24	0	7	0	—		31	0
Inter Turku	Total		33	0	7	0	0	0	40	0
Ludogorets Razgrad	2011–12	Bulgarian First League	3	0	1	0	—		4	0
Ludogorets Razgrad	2012–13	Bulgarian First League	5	0	1	0	0	0	6	0
Ludogorets Razgrad	2013–14	Bulgarian First League	17	0	1	0	8 (Note: Includes UEFA Champions League and UEFA Europa League)	1	26	1
Ludogorets Razgrad	2014–15	Bulgarian First League	2	0	2	0	1 (Note: Includes UEFA Europa League)	0	5	0
Ludogorets Razgrad	Total		27	0	5	0	9	1	41	1
Aalesund	2015	Tippeligaen	16	0	1	0	—		17	0
Aalesund	2016	Tippeligaen	3	0	1	0	—		4	0
Aalesund	2017	Eliteserien	0	0	2	1	—		2	1
Aalesund	Total		19	0	4	1	0	0	23	1
Inter Turku	2017	Veikkausliiga	12	0	0	0	—		12	0
Inter Turku	2018	Veikkausliiga	26	0	5	1	—		31	1
Inter Turku	Total		38	0	5	1	0	0	43	1
HIFK	2019	Veikkausliiga	23	0	1	0	—		24	0
SJK	2020	Veikkausliiga	19	0	5	0	—		24	0
SJK	2021	Veikkausliiga	2	0	4	1	—		6	1
SJK	Total		21	0	9	1	0	0	30	1
SJK II	2021	Kakkonen	6	0	—		—		6	0
Career total			192	0	31	3	9	1	232	4

== Honours ==
=== Club ===
Ludogorets

- Bulgarian A Group: 2011–12, 2012–13, 2013–14
- Bulgarian Cup: 2011–12, 2013–14
- Bulgarian Supercup: 2012, 2014
