= Matias Vainionpää =

Finnish footballer (born 2001)

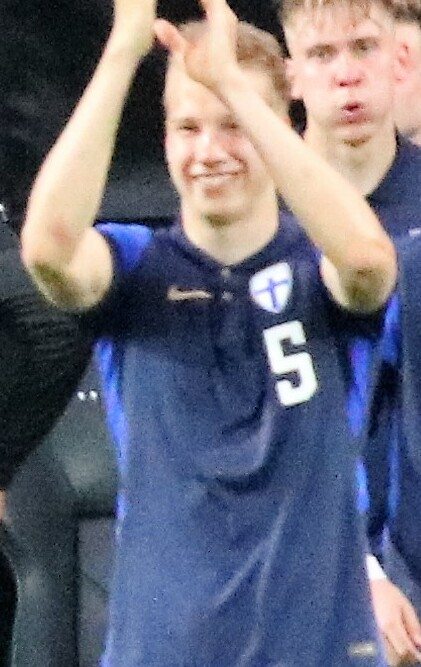
- Vainionpää in 2022

Personal information
- Full name: Matias Ville Samuli Vainionpää
- Date of birth: 2 October 2001 (age 25)
- Place of birth: Seinäjoki, Finland
- Position: Defender

Team information
- Current team: Lahti
- Number: 21

Youth career
- –2019: SJK

Senior career*
| Years | Team | Apps | (Gls) |
| 2019–2020 | SJK Akatemia | 23 | (2) |
| 2020–2023 | SJK | 45 | (2) |
| 2024– | Lahti | 43 | (1) |

International career^{‡}
| 2020-2022 | Finland U21 | 11 | (0) |
- * Club domestic league appearances and goals as of 23 November 2025 ‡ National team caps and goals as of 19 April 2023

Matias Ville Samuli Vainionpää (born 2 October 2001) is a Finnish professional footballer who plays for Ykkösliiga club Lahti as a defender.

== Career statistics ==
As of 1 April 2025

Appearances and goals by club, season and competition
| Club | Season | League | | | Cup (Note: Includes Suomen Cup) | | League cup (Note: Includes Ykköscup, Finnish League Cup and Ykkösliigacup) | | Europe | | Total | |
| Club | Season | Division | Apps | Goals | Apps | Goals | Apps | Goals | Apps | Goals | Apps | Goals |
|---|---|---|---|---|---|---|---|---|---|---|---|---|
| SJK Akatemia | 2019 | Kakkonen | 10 | 0 | 2 | 0 | – | | – | | 12 | 0 |
| SJK Akatemia | 2020 | Ykkönen | 1 | 0 | 1 | 0 | – | | – | | 2 | 0 |
| SJK Akatemia | 2021 | Kakkonen | 7 | 2 | – | | – | | – | | 7 | 2 |
| SJK Akatemia | 2022 | Ykkönen | 1 | 0 | 0 | 0 | 2 | 0 | – | | 3 | 0 |
| SJK Akatemia | 2023 | Ykkönen | 4 | 0 | 0 | 0 | 0 | 0 | – | | 4 | 0 |
| SJK Akatemia | Total | | 23 | 2 | 3 | 0 | 0 | 0 | 0 | 0 | 26 | 2 |
| SJK | 2020 | Veikkausliiga | 15 | 0 | – | | – | | – | | 15 | 0 |
| SJK | 2021 | Veikkausliiga | 13 | 1 | 5 | 0 | – | | – | | 18 | 1 |
| SJK | 2022 | Veikkausliiga | 13 | 1 | 1 | 0 | 0 | 0 | 1 (Note: Appearance(s) in UEFA Conference League) | 0 | 15 | 1 |
| SJK | 2023 | Veikkausliiga | 4 | 0 | 2 | 1 | 4 | 0 | – | | 10 | 1 |
| SJK | Total | | 45 | 2 | 8 | 1 | 4 | 0 | 1 | 0 | 58 | 3 |
| Lahti | 2024 | Veikkausliiga | 27 | 1 | 3 | 0 | 6 | 0 | – | | 36 | 1 |
| Lahti | 2025 | Ykkösliiga | 0 | 0 | 0 | 0 | 1 | 0 | – | | 1 | 0 |
| Lahti | Total | | 27 | 1 | 3 | 0 | 7 | 0 | 0 | 0 | 37 | 1 |
| Career total | | | 95 | 5 | 14 | 1 | 13 | 0 | 1 | 0 | 123 | 6 |
