= Keaton Isaksson =

Finnish footballer (born 1994)

Personal information
- Date of birth: 21 April 1994 (age 32)
- Height: 1.84 m (6 ft 0 in)
- Position: Midfielder

Team information
- Current team: Käpylän Pallo
- Number: 31

Senior career*
Years	Team	Apps	(Gls)
2013	PKKU	23	(2)
2014	Viikingit	11	(0)
2014	→ Viikingit 2 (loan)	1	(0)
2015	Gnistan	14	(6)
2015	HIFK	1	(0)
2016	Ekenäs IF	22	(2)
2017	IFK Luleå	21	(6)
2018	PS Kemi	17	(4)
2018–2019	IFK Mariehamn	40	(7)
2020	SJK	14	(0)
2021–2022	HIFK	31	(3)
2022–2023	Kozani		
2023	Gnistan	3	(0)
2025	JäPS	7	(3)
2025–2026	Sokół Bożepole Wielkie	4	(0)
2026–	Käpylän Pallo	5	(0)
- * Club domestic league appearances and goals as of 20 October 2026

Keaton Isaksson (born 21 April 1994) is a Finnish professional footballer who plays as a midfielder for Ykkösliiga club Käpylän Pallo.

== Career ==
Isaksson signed for SJK for the 2020 season. He left the club on 13 November 2020, moving to HIFK in February 2021. On 8 April 2022, Isaksson returned to HIFK for the 2022 season. On 17 July 2022, HIFK announced that his contract had expired and would not be renewed.
