= Arjanit Krasniqi =

Kosovar footballer

Personal information
- Full name: Arjanit Krasniqi
- Date of birth: 16 September 1999 (age 27)
- Place of birth: Westminster, England
- Height: 1.85 m (6 ft 1 in)
- Position: Midfielder

Senior career*
Years	Team	Apps	(Gls)
- Spartans Youth
2017–2018	Waltham Forest	3	(0)
2018–2019	Colchester United	0	(0)
2019	Billericay Town	3	(0)
2020	SJK	0	(0)
2020	→ SJK Akatemia	6	(0)
2020–2022	Braintree Town	29	(4)
2022	Dover Athletic	37	(0)
2022–2023	Chelmsford City	22	(3)
2023	Hemel Hempstead Town	17	(1)
2023–2024	Aveley	23	(1)
2024–2025	Maidstone United	14	(0)
2024–2025	→ Billericay Town (loan)	12	(2)
2025	→ Dulwich Hamlet (loan)	5	(0)
2026	Polonia Słubice	17	(10)

International career
- Kosovo U19
- Kosovo U21
- * Club domestic league appearances and goals as of 13:18, 9 November 2024 (UTC)

Arjanit Krasniqi (born 16 October 1999) is a footballer who last played as a midfielder for Polish club Polonia Słubice. Born in England, he has represented Kosovo at youth level.

== Club career ==
Born in England, Krasniqi started his playing career with Spartans Youth, playing for the club for two seasons, before playing for Waltham Forest during the 2017–18 campaign. Krasniqi later sealed a move to EFL club Colchester United in January 2018. After just less than 18 months at the Essex-based side, Krasniqi was released at the end of his contract in June 2019.

Following his release from Colchester, Krasniqi enjoyed a brief spell at fellow Essex team Billericay Town, before signing a two-year deal with Finnish side SJK in February 2020. Later that month, he made his debut during a 1–0 defeat against KuPS in a Finnish Cup tie, replacing fellow Kosovan Anel Rashkaj with ten minutes remaining. On 7 September 2020, Krasniqi's contract was terminated following his desire to return to his native England.

Following his return to England, Krasniqi joined up with National League South side Braintree Town in October 2020, and made his debut during a 4–3 home defeat to Hemel Hempstead Town. He made 35 appearances for the Iron, scoring seven goals.

In January 2022, Krasniqi signed for Dover Athletic on a non-contract basis. Krasniqi signed a contract with the club following relegation at the end of the 2021–22 season. On 28 December 2022, Krasniqi departed the club having had his contract terminated by mutual consent.

On 31 December 2022, Krasniqi signed for Chelmsford City.

On 7 July 2023, Krasniqi joined Hemel Hempstead Town.

In December 2023, Krasniqi signed for Aveley.

In June 2024, Krasniqi joined fellow National League South side Maidstone United. On 7 November 2024, he returned to Isthmian League Premier Division side Billericay Town on a three-month loan deal. In March 2025, Krasniqi signed for fellow Isthmian Premier Division side Dulwich Hamlet on loan.

In March 2026, Krasniqi moved to Poland, signing for Polonia Słubice. During the 2025–26 season, Krasniqi scored 11 goals in 18 appearances in all competitions for the club.

== International career ==
Krasniqi has represented Kosovo at under-19 and under-21 levels.

== Career statistics ==
As of end of 2021–22 season

Appearances and goals by club, season and competition
Club	Season	League			National Cup		League Cup		Other		Total	
Club	Season	Division	Apps	Goals	Apps	Goals	Apps	Goals	Apps	Goals	Apps	Goals
Waltham Forest	2017–18	Essex Senior League	3	0	1	0	—		1 (Note: Appearance(s) in the FA Vase)	0	5	0
Colchester United	2017–18	League Two	0	0	—		—		—		0	0
Colchester United	2018–19	League Two	0	0	0	0	0	0	0	0	0	0
Colchester United	Total		0	0	0	0	0	0	0	0	0	0
Billericay Town	2019–20	National League South	3	0	3	0	—		2 (Note: One appearance in the FA Trophy, one appearance in Essex Senior Cup)	0	8	0
SJK	2020	Veikkausliiga	0	0	2	0	—		—		2	0
SJK Akatemia	2020	Ykkönen	6	0	0	0	—		—		6	0
Braintree Town	2020–21	National League South	10	2	—		—		2 (Note: Appearance(s) in the FA Trophy)	1	12	3
Braintree Town	2021–22	National League South	19	2	1	0	—		3 (Note: Two appearances and two goals in FA Trophy, one appearance in Essex Senior Cup)	2	23	4
Braintree Town	Total		29	4	1	0	0	0	5	3	35	7
Dover Athletic	2021–22	National League	18	0	—		—		—		18	0
Career total			59	4	7	0	0	0	8	3	74	7
