= Walter Viitala =

Finnish footballer (born 1992)

Personal information
- Date of birth: 9 January 1992 (age 34)
- Place of birth: Helsinki, Finland
- Height: 1.90 m (6 ft 3 in)
- Position: Goalkeeper

Youth career
- PPJ Eira

Senior career*
Years	Team	Apps	(Gls)
2010–2015	Honka	52	(0)
2011	→ HIFK (loan)	17	(0)
2012	→ Pallohonka	2	(0)
2015–2016	IFK Mariehamn	41	(0)
2017–2018	Viborg FF	20	(0)
2018	Malmö FF	2	(0)
2019	Sandefjord	13	(0)
2020–2021	SJK	8	(0)
2022–2023	Inter Turku	20	(0)

International career^{‡}
2008	Finland U-16	6	(0)
2009	Finland U-17	10	(0)
2011	Finland U-19	17	(0)
2012	Finland U-20	7	(0)
2013	Finland U-21	10	(0)
2017–2019	Finland	3	(0)
Medal record
Honka
Winner	Finnish Cup	2012
IFK Mariehamn
Winner	Veikkausliiga	2016
- * Club domestic league appearances and goals as of 29 May 2023 ‡ National team caps and goals as of 17 January 2019

Walter Viitala (born 9 January 1992) is a Finnish former professional footballer who last played as goalkeeper for Inter Turku.

== Club career ==
After winning the Finnish championship title with IFK Mariehamn, on 15 December 2016, Viitala signed a 2.5-year contract with Viborg FF on a free transfer. He made his debut in a 1–0 victory against AaB on 8 April 2017.

On 11 August 2018 Viitala signed for Swedish champions Malmö FF. He signed a short-term contract for the rest of the year to replace injured back-up goalkeeper Fredrik Andersson. He made his first appearance for Malmö FF on 23 September 2018, when he replaced an injured Johan Dahlin at halftime in a 4–0 victory over Kalmar FF. He made his first start a week later in a 0–0 draw against GIF Sundsvall.

On 2 December 2021, he joined Inter Turku on a two-year contract. He retired after the 2023 season.

== International career ==
Viitala is a former youth international for Finland, and represented his country from under-16 to under-21 level.

In November 2016, Viitala received his first call-up to the senior Finland squad for the match against Ukraine. He made a debut on 9 January 2017 in a 1–0 win against Morocco in Al Ain.

== Coaching career ==
After retiring as a player, on 24 October 2023, it was announced that Viitala starts as a goalkeeping coach in his former youth club PPJ.

== Career statistics ==
=== Club ===
As of 31 December 2023.

Appearances and goals by club, season and competition
Club	Season	League			Cup (Note: Includes Suomen Cup)		League cup (Note: Includes Finnish League Cup)		Europe		Other		Total	
Club	Season	Division	Apps	Goals	Apps	Goals	Apps	Goals	Apps	Goals	Apps	Goals	Apps	Goals
Honka	2011	Veikkausliiga	0	0	0	0	2	0	—		—		2	0
Honka	2012	Veikkausliiga	10	0	0	0	2	0	—		—		12	0
Honka	2013	Veikkausliiga	27	0	1	0	2	0	2	0	—		30	0
Honka	2014	Veikkausliiga	15	0	0	0	3	0	1	0	—		18	0
Honka	Total		52	0	1	0	9	0	3	0	0	0	65	0
HIFK (loan)	2011	Ykkönen	17	0	0	0	0	0	—		—		17	0
Pallohonka	2012	Kakkonen	2	0	0	0	0	0	—		—		2	0
IFK Mariehamn	2015	Veikkausliiga	8	0	3	0	2	0	—		—		13	0
IFK Mariehamn	2016	Veikkausliiga	33	0	1	0	3	0	2	0	—		39	0
IFK Mariehamn	Total		41	0	4	0	5	0	2	0	0	0	52	0
Viborg FF	2016–17	Danish Superliga	5	0	0	0	—		—		6 (Note: Appearances in the Danish Superliga relegation play-offs)	0	11	0
Viborg FF	2017–18	Danish 1st Division	13	0	0	0	—		—		—		13	0
Viborg FF	2018–19	Danish 1st Division	2	0	0	0	—		—		—		2	0
Viborg FF	Total		20	0	0	0	0	0	0	0	6	0	26	0
Malmö FF	2018	Allsvenskan	2	0	0	0	—		0	0	—		2	0
Sandefjord	2019	1. divisjon	13	0	0	0	—		—		—		13	0
Sandefjord 2	2019	4. divisjon	1	0	—		—		—		—		1	0
SJK	2020	Veikkausliiga	8	0	0	0	—		—		—		8	0
SJK	2021	Veikkausliiga	0	0	3	0	—		—		—		3	0
SJK	Total		8	0	3	0	0	0	0	0	0	0	11	0
SJK Akatemia	2021	Kakkonen	1	0	—		—		—		—		1	0
Inter Turku	2022	Veikkausliiga	20	0	0	0	1	0	0	0	—		21	0
Inter Turku	2023	Veikkausliiga	0	0	0	0	0	0	—		—		0	0
Inter Turku	Total		20	0	0	0	1	0	0	0	0	0	21	0
Career total			177	0	8	0	15	0	5	0	6	0	211	0

=== International ===
As of match played 11 January 2019

Finland
Year	Apps	Goals
2017	2	0
2018	0	0
2019	1	0
Total	3	0

== Honours ==
IFK Mariehamn

- Veikkausliiga (1): 2016
- Finnish Cup: 2015

Individual

- Veikkausliiga Player of the Month: April 2016
- Veikkausliiga Goalkeeper of the Year: 2016
- Veikkausliiga Team of the Year: 2016
