= Harvey Sayer =

English footballer

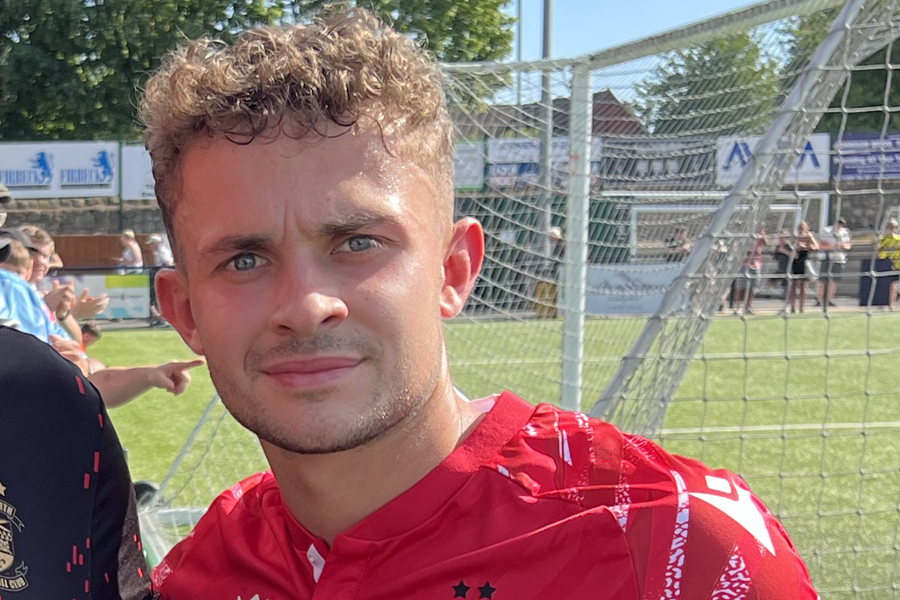
- Sayer in July 2025

Personal information
- Full name: Harvey Stephen Sayer
- Date of birth: 6 January 2003 (age 23)
- Place of birth: Gorleston-on-Sea, England
- Height: 5 ft 7 in (1.70 m)
- Position: Right winger

Team information
- Current team: Leiston

Youth career
- 2008–2011: Bungay Town
- 2011–2016: Norwich City
- 2017–2020: Colchester United

Senior career*
| Years | Team | Apps | (Gls) |
| 2020–2023 | Colchester United | 4 | (0) |
| 2019 | → Maldon & Tiptree (loan) | 0 | (0) |
| 2021 | → Billericay Town (loan) | 4 | (0) |
| 2021–2022 | → Needham Market (loan) | 26 | (7) |
| 2022–2023 | → Maldon & Tiptree (loan) | 17 | (4) |
| 2023 | → Stowmarket Town (loan) | 13 | (3) |
| 2023–2025 | Lowestoft Town | 78 | (39) |
| 2025–2026 | Tamworth | 12 | (2) |
| 2025 | → Leiston (loan) | 5 | (1) |
| 2025–2026 | → Lowestoft Town (loan) | | |
| 2026– | Leiston | 0 | (0) |

International career^{‡}
| 2018 | England U15 | 1 | (0) |
- * Club domestic league appearances and goals as of 22:00, 6 February 2026 (UTC) ‡ National team caps and goals as of 22:00, 6 February 2026 (UTC)

Harvey Stephen Sayer (born 6 January 2003) is an English footballer who plays for Southern League Premier Division Central club Leiston, where he plays as a right winger.

== Career ==
Born in Gorleston-on-Sea, Sayer started his youth career at local side Bungay Town, aged five. At the age of eight, he joined the Norwich City Academy. He was released at age 12.

In January 2017, aged 14, he signed for Colchester United, having impressed on trial after appearing against the club for Suffolk Schools.

Sayer joined Isthmian League Division One North side Maldon & Tiptree on loan in 2019-20. But made just two appearances for the club, playing in their penalty shoot-out defeat to AFC Sudbury in the Alan Turvey Trophy, and as a second-half substitute in their 4–0 win against Witham Town in the Essex Senior Cup, before returning to parent club Colchester United.

On 29 September 2020, Sayer made his first-team debut for Colchester United, coming on as a second-half substitute for Miles Welch-Hayes in a 1–0 EFL Trophy group stage defeat to West Ham United Under-21s.

On 11 January 2021, Sayer signed his first professional contract at Colchester United - a two-year deal keeping him at the club until Summer 2023.

Sayer made his English Football League debut on 23 February 2021, coming on as a late substitute for Aramide Oteh in Colchester United's 2–1 League Two defeat to Exeter City.

On 21 August 2021, Sayer joined National League South side Billericay Town on loan. He made his debut the same day in their 5–2 defeat to Eastbourne Borough. Sayer made a total of 4 appearances during his loan spell at Billericay Town.

On 21 October 2021, Sayer joined Southern League Premier Division Central side Needham Market on loan. Sayer scored 9 goals in 37 appearances for Needham Market, including starting in the 2021-22 Suffolk Premier Cup Final penalty shootout victory over Leiston at Colchester Community Stadium, the home of parent club Colchester United.

Sayer started the 2022-23 season on loan at Isthmian Division One North side Maldon & Tiptree, for the second time in his career. He was given more opportunities this time around, scoring 5 goals in 22 appearances.

In February 2023, Sayer joined fellow Isthmian Division One North side Stowmarket Town on an initial one-month loan deal. His loan was extended until the end of the season, finishing with 3 goals in 15 appearances for Stowmarket Town.

At the end of the 2022-23 season, after six and a half years with the club, Sayer was released by Colchester United.

On 11 August 2023, the eve of the new season, Sayer joined Isthmain Division One North side Lowestoft Town. Sayer finished the 2023-24 season with 26 goals in 41 appearances, as Lowestoft Town were crowned champions and promoted to the Southern League Premier Central.

On 20 June 2025, it was announced that Sayer had signed for National League side Tamworth.

Sayer signed for Southern League Premier side Leiston on 17 November 2025, on a months loan. Sayer made his debut the following night in a Southern League Premier home fixture, losing 1-0 to Bishops Stortford.

Sayer then returned to his former club Lowestoft Town on 20 December 2025.

Sayer departed Tamworth on 5 February 2026, and the following day re-signed on a permanent deal with Leiston. Harvey made a winning start on his return to Leiston, scoring in a 3-2 victory away at Barwell in the Southern League Premier Division.

== International career ==
In February 2018, Sayer was called up to the England Under-15s squad for a training camp. He appeared for the Young Lions against Belgium.

== Career statistics ==
As of 6 February 2026

Appearances and goals by club, season and competition
| Club | Season | League | | | National Cup | | League Cup | | Other | | Total | |
| Club | Season | Division | Apps | Goals | Apps | Goals | Apps | Goals | Apps | Goals | Apps | Goals |
|---|---|---|---|---|---|---|---|---|---|---|---|---|
| Colchester United | 2020–21 | League Two | 4 | 0 | 0 | 0 | 0 | 0 | 1 (Note: Appearance in EFL Trophy) | 0 | 5 | 0 |
| Colchester United | 2021–22 | League Two | 0 | 0 | 0 | 0 | 0 | 0 | 0 | 0 | 0 | 0 |
| Colchester United | 2022–23 | League Two | 0 | 0 | 0 | 0 | 0 | 0 | 0 | 0 | 0 | 0 |
| Colchester United | Total | | 4 | 0 | 0 | 0 | 0 | 0 | 1 | 0 | 5 | 0 |
| Maldon & Tiptree (loan) | 2019–20 | Isthmian League D1 North | 0 | 0 | 0 | 0 | – | | 2 (Note: One appearance in Alan Turvey Trophy and one appearance in Essex Senior Cup) | 0 | 2 | 0 |
| Billericay Town (loan) | 2021–22 | National League South | 4 | 0 | 0 | 0 | – | | 0 | 0 | 4 | 0 |
| Needham Market (loan) | 2021–22 | Southern Premier Central | 26 | 7 | 0 | 0 | – | | 11 (Note: Seven appearances and one goal in FA Trophy, four appearances and one goal in Suffolk Premier Cup) | 2 | 37 | 9 |
| Maldon & Tiptree (loan) | 2022–23 | Isthmian League D1 North | 17 | 4 | 3 | 1 | – | | 2 (Note: One appearance in FA Trophy and one appearance in The Velocity Cup) | 0 | 22 | 5 |
| Stowmarket Town (loan) | 2022–23 | Isthmian League North Division | 13 | 3 | 0 | 0 | — | | 2 (Note: Appearance(s) in Suffolk Premier Cup) | 0 | 15 | 3 |
| Lowestoft Town | 2023–24 | Isthmian League D1 North | 36 | 23 | 2 | 1 | — | | 3 | 2 | 41 | 26 |
| Lowestoft Town | 2024–25 | Southern Premier Central | 42 | 16 | 5 | 8 | — | | 2 | 1 | 49 | 25 |
| Tamworth | 2025–26 | National League | 12 | 2 | 0 | 0 | — | | 2 (Note: Appearance(s) in National League Cup) | 0 | 14 | 2 |
| Leiston (loan) | 2025–26 | Southern Premier Central | 5 | 1 | 0 | 0 | — | | 0 | 0 | 5 | 1 |
| Lowestoft Town (loan) | 2025–26 | Isthmian League D1 North | 0 | 0 | 0 | 0 | — | | 0 | 0 | 0 | 0 |
| Leiston | 2025–26 | Southern Premier Central | 0 | 0 | 0 | 0 | — | | 0 | 0 | 0 | 0 |
| Career total | | | 161 | 56 | 10 | 10 | 0 | 0 | 25 | 15 | 194 | 71 |
