= 2020–21 Colchester United F.C. season =

Colchester United
2020–21 season
- Owner: Robbie Cowling
- Chairman: Robbie Cowling
- Head coach: Steve Ball (until 23 February); Wayne Brown (interim) (24 February to 31 March); Hayden Mullins (interim) (from 31 March)
- Stadium: Colchester Community Stadium
- League Two: 20th
- FA Cup: First round (eliminated by Marine)
- EFL Cup: First round (eliminated by Reading)
- EFL Trophy: Group stage
- Top goalscorer: League: Callum Harriott (9); All: Jevani Brown (11)
- Highest home attendance: 1,094 v Morecambe, 19 December 2020
- Lowest home attendance: 1,000 v Grimsby Town, 5 December 2020
- Average home league attendance: 1,047
- Biggest win: 6–1 v Southend United, 10 November 2020
- Biggest defeat: 1–6 v Exeter City, 24 November 2020
Home colours	Away colours	Third colours

The 2020–21 season was Colchester United's 84th season in their history and their fifth successive season competing in League Two. Along with competing in League Two, the club also participated in the FA Cup, EFL Cup and EFL Trophy.

Following a promising start to the campaign, Colchester had just one win between 12 December 2020 and 9 April 2021 without a win, propelling them towards the relegation positions. This run of form cost manager Steve Ball his job in February, while his interim replacement Wayne Brown fared little better. Hayden Mullins was promoted to interim head coach on 31 March and a number of wins, including victory against bitter relegation rivals Southend United, aided Colchester to safety in the penultimate game of the season. They finished the season in 20th position, six points clear of the relegation zone.

Colchester were eliminated in the first round of the FA Cup in a penalty shoot-out to Northern Premier League Division One North West side Marine. The U's also lost in the first round of the EFL Cup to Championship club Reading. At the same time, they exited the EFL Trophy at the group stage following defeats to Portsmouth and West Ham United under-21s. Despite this, they did earn the largest cup Essex derby victory with a 6–1 win against Southend.

== Season overview ==
=== Pre-season ===
Colchester's place in League Two for the 2020–21 season was confirmed on 22 June 2020 following a 3–2 aggregate defeat to Exeter City in the semi-final of the League Two play-offs.

Chairman Robbie Cowling had already announced on 27 April 2020 that four first-team players would be released at the end of their contracts on 30 June. These players included Brandon Comley, Ryan Jackson, Frank Nouble, and club captain Luke Prosser. Citing the COVID-19 pandemic, Cowling admitted under normal circumstances he "would have been determined to re-sign" the released players.

The following day, the club also released a list of twelve further players who would not be offered new deals on the expiry of their current contracts. These included Dean Ager, Callum Anderson, Jamal Campbell-Ryce, Louis Dunne, Chandler Hallett, Tyrique Hyde, Luke Ige, Tariq Issa, Cameron James, Callum Jones, Percy Kiangebeni, and Bailey Vose.

On 14 July, Cowling released a statement to announce that John McGreal had left the club after four years as head coach.

Ethan Ross left the club on 24 July to join League One side Lincoln City.

On 28 July, McGreal's former assistant Steve Ball was announced as his successor.

Colchester played their first pre-season friendly at home to Gillingham on 15 August. They suffered a 2–0 defeat with goals from Stuart O'Keefe and Connor Ogilvie.

On 18 August, Colchester hosted back-to-back friendlies against Ipswich Town, both of which were 75-minutes in length. Colchester lost 4–0 in the first match, with a brace from Aaron Drinan and goals from Gwion Edwards and Idris El Mizouni. In the second game, Colchester were beaten 1–0. Alan Judge's first-half goal proved to be the difference between the sides.

Again the U's hosted back-to-back friendlies, this time the visiting team were Peterborough United. A brace from Dan Butler and one from Siriki Dembélé all but secured victory for Peterborough, before Colchester scored their first goal of pre-season when Jevani Brown earned an 81st-minute consolation. In the second game, a young U's side were defeated by a first-half Ricky-Jade Jones brace.

Following the friendly with Peterborough, Colchester announced the signing of Tommy Smith following his release from Sunderland. He agreed a two-year deal having featured in a number of pre-season friendly matches.

On 28 August, the U's announced their second signing of the summer, former Liverpool goalkeeper Shamal George. He agreed a two-year deal following a trial period.

Colchester fell behind to their National League opposition Wealdstone on 29 August. This followed a melee between the two sets of players which resulted in Wealdstone's Danny Green being sent off. Tom Eastman equalised in the 52nd-minute, and Jevani Brown secured a 2–1 victory ten minutes later.

On 3 September, Colchester announced Steve Ball's assistant would be former Watford coach Hayden Mullins.

On 4 September, Harry Pell was named as Colchester United's new club captain. His vice-captain was newly signed defender Tommy Smith.

Colchester made their third summer signing ahead of the new season with the capture of Fulham striker Martell Taylor-Crossdale. He arrived on a season-long loan from the Premier League club.

=== September ===
Colchester played their first competitive match of the season in the first round of the EFL Cup on 5 September when they faced Championship side Reading. Debuts were handed to Tommy Smith and Miquel Scarlett in defence, and Jevani Brown made a return to the Colchester first-team following his loan spell last season at Forest Green Rovers. Brown then scored his first goal for the club in the 37th-minute to give the U's a 1–0 lead, but Reading pulled level with a goal in first-half injury time through Lucas João. He then went on to score two more goals in the second half to seal his hat-trick and send Colchester out of the Cup in the first round. Marley Marshall-Miranda also came on as a second-half substitute to make his professional debut.

Martell Taylor-Crossdale came on as a second-half substitute for his club debut in Colchester's 2–0 EFL Trophy defeat to Portsmouth on 8 September. Also making his debut in goal was Shamal George. Two quick-fire first-half goals from Marcus Harness were enough to secure victory for Pompey.

On 9 September, young forward Michael Fernandes signed for National League South side Dartford on loan until January.

The league season opened with a trip to Valley Parade to face Bradford City on 12 September. The match ended a goalless draw.

Under-23s players Ollie Sims and Matt Weaire were sent out on loan for first-team experience on 18 September until January 2021. Sims joined Southern League Premier South side Farnborough, while centre back Weaire joined Southern League Premier Central side Leiston.

Colchester secured their first win of the season in only their third-ever league meeting with Bolton Wanderers on 19 September. In their first home match of the season, the U's took a first-half lead through Tom Eastman's 44th-minute goal, before doubling their advantage from Jevani Brown's second goal of the campaign after 71-minutes. Sammie McLeod came on as an 83rd-minute substitute to make his professional debut in the 2–0 victory.

The U's were held to a 1–1 draw in their visit to Barrow on 26 September. Noah Chilvers' first professional goal handed the visitors a 1–0 lead after 34-minutes, but the hosts drew level on 54-minutes through Mike Jones.

September ended with a third successive cup defeat of the season for the U's. West Ham United under-21s were 1–0 winners through a 61st-minute Conor Coventry goal. Left back Harvey Sayer made his debut from the substitutes bench during the match.

=== October ===
On 3 October, Colchester hosted Oldham Athletic on match day four. Colchester took a 27th-minute lead through Ben Stevenson, who recorded his first goal of the season. Ten minutes later, the U's were two ahead when Callum Harriott doubled their lead from the penalty spot after Conor McAleny's handball offence. McAleny made amends in the second-half, scoring from a penalty kick after Cohen Bramall was deemed to have fouled Dylan Bahamboula. Then two minutes later, Oldham equalised through Carl Piergianni. Colchester retook the lead on 65-minutes from a Miles Welch-Hayes header, but Oldham again equalised in the 89th-minute, McAleny again the scorer.

Noah Chilvers signed a new three-year contract on 5 October to keep him at the club until summer 2023.

Defender Danny Collinge was sent out on loan to Isthmian League North Division side A.F.C. Sudbury on 8 October until January 2021.

On 9 October, Colchester announced the signing of former Manchester United Academy forward Joshua Bohui, who had his contract cancelled at Dutch side NAC Breda earlier in the week. He signed a two-year deal with the club, joining up with Jon De Souza, who he played under at the Brentford Academy.

Colchester were held to a third successive draw on 10 October. Callum Harriott's second goal in as many games had given the U's a first-half lead, but Walsall struck back in the second-half through Elijah Adebayo to draw 1–1.

Ollie Kensdale was loaned out to National League South side Braintree Town, making his debut for the club on 10 October.

Colchester fell to their first defeat of the season on 17 October. Hosts Carlisle United took a 2–0 first-half lead before Luke Norris scored his first goal of the season a minute before the interval. It was 2–2 by the 52nd-minute, Norris converting a penalty kick. However, Carlisle nicked the win with an 81st-minute goal from Aaron Hayden.

Having been on loan at Dartford, Michael Fernandes joined Ollie Sims on loan at Farnborough on 20 October, signing with his former club until January 2021.

The U's returned to winning ways with a 1–0 victory over Forest Green Rovers on 20 October. Noah Chilvers' second-minute goal and second goal of the season was enough to secure the win.

On 24 October, Colchester beat Harrogate Town 2–1 in their first-ever league meeting. Callum Harriott scored his third goal of the season on 52-minutes, before Ben Stevenson followed up two minutes later to double the U's lead. Jon Stead pulled a goal back for the visitors on 61-minutes, but the hosts held on for victory.

Colchester suffered their second league defeat of the season on 27 October at top of the table Newport County. Scott Twine opened the scoring on 51-minutes, but substitute Jevani Brown scored an 89th-minute equaliser for the visitors. In the first minute of injury time, Newport scored their winner through Pádraig Amond.

On 27 October, it was announced that Scunthorpe United had eight players test positive for COVID-19, and their next three fixtures would be postponed, including their match against Colchester originally scheduled for 30 October.

=== November ===
Colchester signed former Watford striker Michael Folivi on 2 November on a contract until the end of the season.

Colchester returned to winning ways on 3 November with a 3–1 home win against Stevenage. Jevani Brown scored an 11th-minute opener, before the visitors equalised from the penalty spot four minutes later following a Tommy Smith foul. After the break, Brown added a second in the 57th-minute, and completed his hat-trick in the 81st-minute.

Colchester were knocked out of the FA Cup first round by Northern Premier League Division One North West side Marine on 7 November. The eighth-tier visitors took a 22nd-minute lead through Anthony Miley, but captain Harry Pell brought the U's back into the tie with a 64th-minute equaliser. The resilient Mariners took the tie to extra time, and held out to a penalty shoot-out. Colchester and Marine converted all of their penalties until Josh Bohui stepped up to take United's fourth, which he put wide. Jay Devine scored the subsequent kick and put Marine through to the second round of the Cup for the first time since the 1992–93 season.

In the first Essex derby match since 2018, Colchester faced league rivals Southend United in their final dead rubber EFL Trophy group match on 10 November. Colchester took the lead through leading scorer Jevani Brown after 16-minutes, before he doubled the U's lead after 38-minutes. He secured his second hat-trick in a week after the break when he converted from the penalty spot following a foul on Josh Bohui. Brown was then replaced by Samson Tovide who came on to make his professional debut for the club. Michael Folivi registered his first goal for Colchester to make the score 4–0 on 62-minutes. Noah Chilvers made it 5–0 with 20 minutes remaining, and Kwame Poku scored his first of the season to make it six on 83-minutes. Southend did manage to score a consolation in the second minute of injury time through Kazaiah Sterling. The victory was Colchester's biggest of the season to date, and the largest margin of victory in any Essex derby encounter for either side.

Brown continued his excellent goalscoring form with a brace against Leyton Orient in League Two on 14 November. A goal in each half put the U's in charge, despite the O's scoring a late consolation goal from Conor Wilkinson.

The U's salvaged a late draw against Mansfield Town on 20 November. Nicky Maynard had opened the scoring for the hosts mid-way through the second-half, but Luke Norris' third goal of the season on 85-minutes secured a point for the visitors.

Colchester were thrashed 6–1 by Exeter City on 24 November. Matt Jay's 20th-minute goal gave Exeter a 1–0 lead going into the interval. Steve Ball made three half-time substitutions, but their effect was minimal as the floodgates opened. Joel Randall doubled Exeter's lead on 53-minutes, then Ryan Bowman scored his first of three goals four minutes later. He made it 4–0 on 71-minutes, before Colchester pulled a goal back through substitute Michael Folivi. Bowman completed his hat-trick in the third minute of stoppage time, but Exeter still had enough time to add a sixth when Jay scored his second goal of the game with 95-minutes on the clock.

=== December ===
Colchester were held to a draw by Crawley Town on 1 December. The U's had taken the lead through Callum Harriott's 13th-minute goal, but were pegged back by a Jordan Tunnicliffe goal seven minutes later. The scores remained level through the second-half.

The return of supporters to the Colchester Community Stadium on 5 December was overshadowed by a minority of the 1,000 Colchester supporters who booed when the players took a knee prior to kick-off, a gesture that has been commonplace throughout the Premier League and English Football League since June to raise awareness of racial inequality. During the match against Grimsby Town, Colchester took the lead through Tommy Smith, who registered his first goal for the club. Luke Hendrie equalised for the visitors mid-way through the second-half, but Callum Harriott scored his second goal in as many games to secure victory for the U's. The match also saw Junior Tchamadeu make his debut at right-back, becoming the youngest player to start for the club.

Tommy Smith scored his second goal in as many fixtures on 8 December as Colchester held on for a 1–0 victory following his 26th-minute opener at Scunthorpe United. It was Colchester's first away victory of the season.

Colchester came from behind to draw with Port Vale on 12 December. Devante Rodney's 58th-minute goal gave Vale the lead, but Luke Norris struck seven minutes later as the U's held out for a 1–1 away draw.

On 15 December, Colchester were beaten 2–1 at Cambridge United in front of almost 2,000 fans, but the match was overshadowed by a small number of the home supporters booing when players took the knee before kick-off. The home side took the lead through Paul Mullin after 50-minutes, and he scored his second of the game 15-minutes later. Michael Folivi was fouled in the penalty area and stepped up to score, but it was not enough for the U's as they fell to defeat.

On 18 December, the Football Association announced no further action would be taken against Colchester after fans had booed players taking a knee in the home win against Grimsby. They did announce however that an investigation would take place into a similar incident in the Cambridge away fixture.

Colchester's unbeaten home record came to an end as they dropped out of the play-off places with defeat at home to Morecambe on 19 December. John O'Sullivan opened the scoring for the visitors after eight minutes of play, but Michael Folivi scored his second goal in as many games to level the scores on 23-minutes. Yann Songo'o's second-half header would prove to be the winner for Morecambe.

On 21 December, Marley Marshall-Miranda, who had made his first-team debut earlier in the season, signed a new two-and-a-half-year contract to keep him with the club until summer 2023.

In their Boxing Day Essex Derby match against Southend United, Colchester were beaten 2–0, with two first-half goals from Simeon Akinola and Timothée Dieng.

Colchester's run of games without a win extended to five on 29 December, when they were held to a goalless draw by Cheltenham Town.

=== January ===
Colchester's first scheduled game of 2021 was postponed on the morning of the fixture with Tranmere Rovers due to players in both squads showing symptoms of COVID-19.

On 5 January, striker Luke Norris departed the club to sign for League Two rivals Stevenage.

Yet to play in 2021, Colchester's match at Salford City scheduled for 9 January was postponed on 8 January due to a frozen pitch, with worsening weather conditions expected overnight.

Harvey Sayer, who made his debut for the club earlier in the season, signed his first professional contract with the club on 11 January. His new deal would keep him with the U's until summer 2023.

Colchester played their first game of 2021 on 16 January when they hosted Cambridge United. The visitors took a 12th-minute lead through Harvey Knibbs, but a Greg Taylor own goal on 39-minutes denied the visitors a third consecutive league win as both sides settled for a point.

On 19 January, Colchester signed Queens Park Rangers striker Aramide Oteh on loan for the rest of the season, having been on loan at the U's League Two rivals Stevenage earlier in the season. He was recalled from his Stevenage loan by QPR on 11 January.

Luke Gambin departed Colchester on 20 January to join fellow League Two club Newport County on loan until the end of the campaign.

On 23 January, Colchester fell to a 3–0 defeat at Morecambe. Despite hitting the woodwork twice in the first half, Colchester went into the break a goal down after Adam Phillips' opener on the stroke of half-time. Colchester again conceded in the 58th-minute to a Toumani Diagouraga goal before captain Harry Pell was sent off for an off-the-ball incident on the hour mark. Morecambe scored a third through John O'Sullivan ten minutes from full time.

Colchester were held to a 0–0 draw at Stevenage on 26 January, before suffering yet another defeat to Scunthorpe United on 29 January, who won 1–0 at the Community Stadium.

=== February ===
On transfer deadline day, Colchester re-signed Frank Nouble on loan from Plymouth Argyle until the end of the season, while 2019 Charlton Athletic loanee Brendan Sarpong-Wiredu joined the club on a permanent basis. Cohen Bramall left the club to join League One side Lincoln City for an undisclosed fee, while incoming loan signing Josh Doherty from Crawley Town was a direct replacement.

Prior to the transfer window closing, Colchester released seven of their under-23 registered players. These players included Danny Collinge, Michael Fernandes, Ollie Kensdale, Sammie McLeod, Miquel Scarlett, Ollie Sims and Matt Weaire, who all left after cancelling their contracts by mutual consent.

Colchester's rescheduled trip to Salford on 2 February was once again postponed, this time less than one hour before kickoff due to a waterlogged pitch.

Josh Doherty made his Colchester debut on 7 February in Colchester's 0–0 draw at Leyton Orient. Frank Nouble and Brendan Sarpong-Wiredu made their second debuts for the club in the fixture, while Shamal George made his first league start in goal for the U's.

Colchester's home game with Mansfield Town on 13 February was moved back a day to 14 February due to adverse weather conditions. The visitors took the lead when Tommy Smith scored an own goal after just four minutes. The U's were on level terms going into the break through Callum Harriott. James Perch put Mansfield back in front with nine minutes remaining, but Frank Nouble scored his first goal of his loan spell to rescue a point for Colchester in the 89th-minute.

On 20 February, Colchester's winless run extended to 12 games with a 1–0 defeat at Crawley Town. A goal in the third minute of stoppage time ensured yet another defeat for the U's.

Yet again Colchester were beaten on 23 February to leave them fourth from bottom of League Two after Exeter City beat them 2–1 at the Community Stadium. Aramide Oteh scored his first goal for the club, which proved only to be a consolation. Manager Steve Ball parted company with the club following the match amidst a run of 13 games without a win.

On 24 February, Wayne Brown was named interim manager for a second occasion, having previously taken charge of the U's in the 2015–16 season.

Brown's first match in charge ended in a 3–0 defeat to ten-man Forest Green Rovers on 27 February. Colchester trailed by two Jamille Matt goals after 31-minutes, before Rovers had a man sent off in first-half stoppage time. Despite the one man advantage, Colchester could not capitalise, and conceded a third with a Sarpong-Wiredu own goal on 67-minutes.

=== March ===
Colchester finally recorded their first victory of 2021, and their first since 8 December with a 2–1 home victory against Carlisle United on 2 March. The U's trailed 1–0 at the break to a Jon Mellish goal, Carlisle then had a penalty decision overturned early in the second half, before Colchester won and converted a penalty of their own. Frank Nouble had been fouled in the area, and Callum Harriott converted. Seven minutes later, Harriott secured his brace, and with it Colchester's first win in 15 matches, despite having a penalty decision of their own overturned later in the game.

However, Colchester returned to their previous form with a 2–0 home defeat by Newport County on 6 March. In the match, Frank Nouble was sent off for a second bookable offence.

Another dreadful display followed on 9 March as Colchester were humbled 3–0 at Harrogate Town, failing to score away from home once again with the U's not recording a goal in 10 hours and 35 minutes.

On 13 March, Colchester played out a 0–0 away draw against bottom club Grimsby Town.

Colchester again saw out another 0–0 away draw, this time at Salford City on 16 March.

A 1–0 home defeat to fellow strugglers Port Vale on 20 March dropped Colchester to 22nd in the League Two table, just seven points clear of the relegation places.

Colchester recorded a point at home to high-flying Tranmere Rovers on 23 March. The U's held a first half lead through Harry Pell's first league goal of the season. Pell then turned provider for Brendan Sarpong-Wiredu in the 55th minute as the midfielder scored his first professional goal. However, Tranmere pulled a goal back from the penalty spot seven minutes later after Tommy Smith was judged to have handled the ball in the area. In the 67th-minute, the visitors levelled through Jay Spearing.

On 27 March, Colchester were beaten 2–1 at home by Bradford City. The visitors took a tenth-minute lead, before Frank Nouble struck three minutes before half-time to level the scores. Andy Cook handed the Bantams all three points with a goal in the 58th-minute.

After only one win in his nine games in charge, Wayne Brown was replaced by Hayden Mullins as interim manager on 31 March.

=== April ===
On 1 April, former Exeter City, Milton Keynes Dons and Bristol Rovers manager Paul Tisdale joined the club in an advisory role alongside Mullins until the end of the season.

In Mullins' first game in charge, he led his Colchester side to a 0–0 draw away at high flying Bolton Wanderers on 2 April.

A late equaliser from relegation rivals Barrow denied Mullins his first win in charge of Colchester on 5 April. The U's had taken the lead in the 33rd-minute through Callum Harriott, but Tom Beadling's 88th-minute goal denied Colchester all three points.

On 9 April, Colchester were beaten 5–2 at Oldham Athletic. The hosts had opened up a 3–0 lead by the 56th-minute, before the U's pulled a goal back through Frank Nouble after 64-minutes. Tom Eastman's goal in the 81st-minute gave Colchester hope, but two late goals from Davis Keillor-Dunn secured the win for League Two's highest scoring team.

Colchester earned their first win under Mullins on 17 April when they beat Walsall 2–1 at home. The visitors had taken the lead in the 20th-minute before Michael Folivi's first goal since December levelled the score. In the fourth minute of first-half injury time, Ryan Clampin's volleyed strike handed the U's the lead, and they held on in the second half for the three points.

The U's followed their victory over Walsall up with a 2–0 home win in the Essex derby against Southend United on 20 April. First-half goals from Michael Folivi and Harry Pell secured the win, with Southend having Jason Demetriou sent off in the 69th-minute.

Colchester travelled to second-placed Cheltenham Town on 24 April, but the home side took all three points with an 82nd-minute winner.

=== May ===
Colchester confirmed their League Two status on 1 May with a game to spare as they beat nine man Salford City 1–0. Josh Bohui scored his first goal in English football from the substitutes bench to ensure that the U's would finish the season no lower than 22nd in the table.

Colchester played out a goalless draw with Tranmere Rovers on 8 May as they finished the season in 20th position. The match saw the debut of teenage striker Tom Stagg.

== Players ==
As of 8 May 2021

No.	Name	Position	Nat.	Place of birth	Date of birth	Apps	Goals	Signed from	Date signed	Fee
Goalkeepers
1	Dean Gerken	GK	(England)	Southend-on-Sea	22 May 1985 (aged 35)	170	0	(England) Ipswich Town	13 July 2019 (Note: Date of signing refers to the date of the player's signing for his second spell with the club)	Free transfer
28	Callum Coulter	GK	(England)	Frimley	24 October 2000 (aged 19)	0	0	Academy		Free transfer
29	Shamal George	GK	(England)	Birkenhead	6 January 1998 (aged 22)	0	0	(England) Liverpool	28 August 2020	Free transfer
Defenders
2	Miles Welch-Hayes	RB	(England)	Oxford	25 October 1996 (aged 23)	1	0	(England) Macclesfield Town	21 February 2020	Free transfer
5	Tommy Smith	CB	(New Zealand)	(England) Macclesfield	31 March 1990 (aged 30)	6	0	(England) Sunderland	25 August 2020	Free transfer
6	Omar Sowunmi	CB	(England)	Colchester	7 November 1995 (aged 24)	11	0	(England) Yeovil Town	1 July 2019	Undisclosed
18	Tom Eastman	CB	(England)	Colchester	21 October 1991 (aged 28)	362	20	(England) Ipswich Town	19 May 2011	Free transfer
21	Ryan Clampin	LB/LW	(England)	Colchester	29 January 1999 (aged 21)	18	1	Academy		Free transfer
30	Al-Amin Kazeem	LB	(England)		6 April 2002 (aged 18)	0	0	Academy		Free transfer
35	Billy Cracknell	DF	(England)	Brentwood	19 January 2002 (aged 18)	0	0	Academy		Free transfer
36	Harvey Sayer	LB	(England)	Gorleston-on-Sea	6 January 2003 (aged 17)	0	0	Academy		Free transfer
38	Junior Tchamadeu	RB	(England)		22 December 2003 (aged 16)	0	0	Academy		Free transfer
40	Frankie Terry	CB	(England)			0	0	Academy		Free transfer
Midfielders
4	Tom Lapslie	CM	(England)	Waltham Forest	5 October 1995 (aged 24)	157	4	Academy	25 April 2013	Free transfer
8	Harry Pell (c)	MF	(England)	Tilbury	21 October 1991 (aged 28)	61	10	(England) Cheltenham Town	10 May 2018	Undisclosed
10	Jevani Brown	AM	(Jamaica)	(England) Letchworth	16 October 1994 (aged 25)	17	0	(England) Cambridge United	4 July 2019	Undisclosed
14	Noah Chilvers	AM	(England)	Chelmsford	22 February 2001 (aged 19)	5	0	Academy	3 July 2017	Free transfer
16	Diaz Wright	MF	(England)	Greenwich	22 February 1998 (aged 22)	14	0	Academy	30 June 2016	Free transfer
22	Brendan Sarpong-Wiredu	MF	(England)	London	7 November 1999 (aged 20)	10	0	(England) Charlton Athletic	1 February 2021	Undisclosed
23	Kwame Poku	MF	(Ghana)	(England) Croydon	11 August 2001 (aged 18)	38	5	(England) Worthing	17 May 2019	Undisclosed
24	Ben Stevenson	MF	(England)	Leicester	23 March 1997 (aged 23)	63	4	(England) Wolves	30 January 2019	Undisclosed
25	Andre Hasanally	MF	(England)	Waltham Forest	10 February 2002 (aged 18)	2	0	Academy		Free transfer
33	Marley Marshall-Miranda	MF	(England)		22 October 2002 (aged 17)	0	0	Academy		Free transfer
41	Sam Cornish	MF	(England)	Brentwood	26 September 2001 (aged 18)	0	0	Academy		Free transfer
Forwards
7	Courtney Senior	WG	(England)	Croydon	30 June 1997 (aged 22)	106	14	(England) Brentford	28 June 2016	Free transfer
11	Callum Harriott	WG	(Guyana)	(England) Norbury	4 March 1994 (aged 26)	49	10	(England) Reading	5 September 2019	Free transfer
12	Paris Cowan-Hall	WG	(England)	Hillingdon	5 October 1990 (aged 29)	10	2	(England) Wycombe Wanderers	4 July 2019	Free transfer
26	Luke Gambin	WG	(Malta)	(England) Sutton	16 March 1993 (aged 27)	37	2	(England) Luton Town	26 June 2019	Free transfer
32	Jake Hutchinson	CF	(England)	Colchester	8 May 2002 (aged 18)	0	0	Academy		Free transfer
34	Samson Tovide	CF	(England)		4 January 2004 (aged 16)	0	0	Academy		Free transfer
37	Joshua Bohui	FW	(England)	London	3 March 1999 (aged 21)	0	0	(Netherlands) NAC Breda	9 October 2020	Free transfer
39	Michael Folivi	FW	(England)	Wembley	25 February 1998 (aged 22)	0	0	(England) Watford	2 November 2020	Free transfer
42	Tom Stagg	CF	(England)	Harlow	9 September 2002 (aged 17)	0	0	Academy		Free transfer

== Transfers and contracts ==
=== In ===
Date	Position	Nationality	Name	From	Fee	Ref.
25 August 2020	CB	(New Zealand)	Tommy Smith	(England) Sunderland	Free transfer	
28 August 2020	GK	(England)	Shamal George	(England) Liverpool	Free transfer	
9 October 2020	FW	(England)	Joshua Bohui	(Netherlands) NAC Breda	Free transfer	
2 November 2020	FW	(England)	Michael Folivi	(England) Watford	Free transfer	
1 February 2021	MF	(England)	Brendan Sarpong-Wiredu	(England) Charlton Athletic	Undisclosed	

=== Out ===
Date	Position	Nationality	Name	To	Fee	Ref.
30 June 2020	AM	(England)	Dean Ager	Free agent	Released	
30 June 2020	MF	(England)	Callum Anderson	(England) Haverhill Rovers (Note: Following Callum Anderson's release by Colchester United, he later signed for Haverhill Rovers.)	Released	
30 June 2020	WG	(Jamaica)	Jamal Campbell-Ryce	Free agent	Retired	
30 June 2020	MF	(Montserrat)	Brandon Comley	(England) Bolton Wanderers (Note: Following Brandon Comley's release by Colchester United, he later signed for Bolton Wanderers.)	Released	
30 June 2020	MF	(Republic of Ireland)	Louis Dunne	(England) Farnborough (Note: Following Louis Dunne's release by Colchester United, he later signed for Farnborough.)	Released	
30 June 2020	GK	(England)	Chandler Hallett	(England) Wellington (Note: Following Chandler Hallett's release by Colchester United, he later signed for Wellington)	Released	
30 June 2020	MF	(England)	Tyrique Hyde	(England) Dulwich Hamlet (Note: Following Tyrique Hyde's release by Colchester United, he later signed for Dulwich Hamlet)	Released	
30 June 2020	RB	(England)	Luke Ige	(England) Merstham (Note: Following Luke Ige's release by Colchester United, he later signed for Merstham)	Released	
30 June 2020	FW	(England)	Tariq Issa	(England) Needham Market (Note: Following Tariq Issa's release by Colchester United, he later signed for Needham Market)	Released	
30 June 2020	RB	(England)	Ryan Jackson	(England) Gillingham (Note: Following Ryan Jackson's release by Colchester United, he later signed for Gillingham.)	Released	
30 June 2020	CB/FB/DM	(England)	Cameron James	(England) Chelmsford City (Note: Following Cameron James' release by Colchester United, he later signed for Chelmsford City.)	Released	
30 June 2020	CF	(England)	Callum Jones	(England) Chelmsford City (Note: Following Callum Jones' release by Colchester United, he later signed for Chelmsford City.)	Released	
30 June 2020	DF	(England)	Percy Kiangebeni	(England) Enfield Town (Note: Following Percy Kiangebeni's release by Colchester United, he later signed for Enfield Town.)	Released	
30 June 2020	CF	(England)	Frank Nouble	(England) Plymouth Argyle (Note: Following Frank Nouble's release by Colchester United, he later signed for Plymouth Argyle.)	Released	
30 June 2020	CB	(England)	Luke Prosser	(England) Stevenage (Note: Following Luke Prosser's release by Colchester United, he later signed for Stevenage.)	Released	
30 June 2020	GK	(England)	Bailey Vose	(England) Margate (Note: Following Bailey Vose's release by Colchester United, he later signed for Margate.)	Released	
24 July 2020	GK	(England)	Ethan Ross	(England) Lincoln City	Undisclosed	
5 January 2021	CF	(England)	Luke Norris	(England) Stevenage	Undisclosed	
1 February 2021	LB	(England)	Cohen Bramall	(England) Lincoln City	Undisclosed	
1 February 2021	DF	(England)	Danny Collinge	(England) Dover Athletic (Note: Following Danny Collinge's release by Colchester United, he later signed for Dover Athletic.)	Released	
1 February 2021	WG	(England)	Michael Fernandes	Free agent	Released	
1 February 2021	CB	(England)	Ollie Kensdale	(England) Concord Rangers (Note: Following Ollie Kensdale's release by Colchester United, he later signed for Concord Rangers.)	Released	
1 February 2021	MF	(England)	Sammie McLeod	(England) Concord Rangers (Note: Following Sammie McLeod's release by Colchester United, he later signed for Concord Rangers.)	Released	
1 February 2021	WG	(England)	Ollie Sims	Free agent	Released	
1 February 2021	RB/MF	(England)	Miquel Scarlett	Free agent	Released	
1 February 2021	CB	(England)	Matthew Weaire	Free agent	Released	

=== Loans in ===
Date	Position	Nationality	Name	From	End date	Ref.
4 September 2020	CF	(England)	Martell Taylor-Crossdale	(England) Fulham	19 October 2020	
19 January 2021	ST	(England)	Aramide Oteh	(England) Queens Park Rangers	End of season	
1 February 2021	CF	(England)	Frank Nouble	(England) Plymouth Argyle	End of season	
1 February 2021	LB	(Northern Ireland)	Josh Doherty	(England) Crawley Town	End of season	

=== Loans out ===
Date	Position	Nationality	Name	To	End date	Ref.
September 2020	DF	(England)	Billy Cracknell	(England) Maldon & Tiptree	December 2020	
9 September 2020	WG	(England)	Michael Fernandes	(England) Dartford	October 2020	
18 September 2020	WG	(England)	Ollie Sims	(England) Farnborough	January 2021	
18 September 2020	CB	(Denmark)	Matthew Weaire	(England) Leiston	January 2021	
October 2020	MF	(England)	Andre Hasanally	(England) Maldon & Tiptree	December 2020	
8 October 2020	DF	(England)	Danny Collinge	(England) A.F.C. Sudbury	January 2021	
10 October 2020	CB	(England)	Ollie Kensdale	(England) Braintree Town	January 2021	
20 October 2020	WG	(England)	Michael Fernandes	(England) Farnborough	January 2021	
20 January 2021	WG	(Malta)	Luke Gambin	(Wales) Newport County	End of season	

=== Contracts ===
New contracts and contract extensions.

Date	Position	Nationality	Name	Length	Expiry	Ref.
25 August 2020	CB	(New Zealand)	Tommy Smith	2 years	June 2022	
28 August 2020	GK	(England)	Shamal George	2 years	June 2022	
5 October 2020	AM	(England)	Noah Chilvers	3 years	June 2023	
9 October 2020	FW	(England)	Joshua Bohui	2 years	June 2022	
2 November 2020	FW	(England)	Michael Folivi	7 months	June 2021	
21 December 2020	MF	(England)	Marley Marshall-Miranda	2½ years	June 2023	
11 January 2021	LB	(England)	Harvey Sayer	2½ years	June 2023	
1 February 2021	MF	(England)	Brendan Sarpong-Wiredu	1½ years	June 2022	

== Match details ==
=== Pre-season friendlies ===
On 13 August 2020, Colchester United announced pre-season home friendlies against Gillingham and Ipswich Town. The first against Gillingham involved players playing no more than 45 minutes each, while the U's hosted two 75-minute long games against Ipswich on the same day. Similarly, Colchester hosted two full friendly matches against Peterborough United on 25 August.

15 August 2020 Friendly	Colchester United	0–2	Gillingham	Colchester
13:30 BST		Report; Report	O'Keefe 21'; Ogilvie 52'	Stadium: Colchester Community Stadium; Referee: C Hicks

18 August 2020 Friendly	Colchester United	0–4	Ipswich Town	Colchester
18:00 BST		Report	Drinan 7', 25'; Edwards 30'; El Mizouni 48'	Stadium: Colchester Community Stadium

18 August 2020 Friendly	Colchester United	0–1	Ipswich Town	Colchester
20:00 BST		Report	Judge 23'	Stadium: Colchester Community Stadium

25 August 2020 Friendly	Colchester United	1–3	Peterborough United	Colchester
17:00 BST	Brown 81'	Report	Butler 30', 53'; Dembélé 33'	Stadium: Colchester Community Stadium

25 August 2020 Friendly	Colchester United	0–2	Peterborough United	Colchester
19:15 BST		Report	Jones 24', 29'	Stadium: Colchester Community Stadium

29 August 2020 Friendly	Wealdstone	1–2	Colchester United	Ruislip
19:15 BST	Emmanuel 45'; Green (red card) 40'	Report	Eastman 52'; Brown 62'	Stadium: Grosvenor Vale

=== League Two ===
==== League table ====
Pos	Team	Pld	W	D	L	GF	GA	GD	Pts	Promotion, qualification or relegation
16	Mansfield Town	46	13	19	14	57	55	+2	58	
17	Harrogate Town	46	16	9	21	52	61	−9	57	
18	Oldham Athletic	46	15	9	22	72	81	−9	54	
19	Walsall	46	11	20	15	45	53	−8	53	
20	Colchester United	46	11	18	17	44	61	−17	51	
21	Barrow	46	13	11	22	53	59	−6	50	
22	Scunthorpe United	46	13	9	24	41	64	−23	48	
23	Southend United (R)	46	10	15	21	29	58	−29	45	Relegation to National League
24	Grimsby Town (R)	46	10	13	23	37	69	−32	43	Relegation to National League

Updated to match(es) played on 31 May 2021. Source: EFL Official Website
Rules for classification: 1) Points; 2) Goal difference; 3) Number of goals scored; 4) Head-to-head results; 5) Wins; 6) Away goals; 7) Penalty points (sec 9.5); 8) 12-point sending off offences
(R) Relegated

==== Results round by round ====
Matchday	1	2	3	4	5	6	7	8	9	10	11	12	13	14	15	16	17	18	19	20	21	22	23	24	25	26	27	28	29	30	31	32	33	34	35	36	37	38	39	40	41	42	43	44	45	46
Ground	A	H	A	H	A	A	H	H	A	H	H	A	A	H	H	A	A	A	H	A	H	H	A	A	H	A	H	A	H	A	H	H	A	A	A	H	H	H	A	H	A	H	H	A	H	A
Result	D	W	D	D	D	L	W	W	L	W	W	D	L	D	W	W	D	L	L	L	D	D	L	D	L	D	D	L	L	L	W	L	L	D	D	L	D	L	D	D	L	W	W	L	W	D
Position	15	6	8	9	9	14	11	9	11	11	7	7	10	12	9	6	6	7	10	11	12	12	15	14	16	17	17	20	21	21	20	20	20	20	21	22	21	21	21	22	22	22	21	20	20	20

Updated to match(es) played on 8 May 2021. Source: 11v11 for league tables and fixtures
A = Away; H = Home; W = Win; D = Draw; L = Loss

==== Matches ====
The 2020–21 season EFL League Two fixtures were revealed on 21 August 2020.

12 September 2020 1	Bradford City	0–0	Colchester United	Bradford
15:00 BST		Report		Stadium: Valley Parade; Referee: Ross Joyce

19 September 2020 2	Colchester United	2–0	Bolton Wanderers	Colchester
15:00 BST	Eastman 44'; Brown 71'	Report		Stadium: Colchester Community Stadium; Referee: James Oldham

26 September 2020 3	Barrow	1–1	Colchester United	Barrow-in-Furness
15:00 BST	M. Jones 54'	Report	Chilvers 34'	Stadium: Holker Street; Referee: Sam Barrott

3 October 2020 4	Colchester United	3–3	Oldham Athletic	Colchester
15:00 BST	Stevenson 27'; Harriott 37' (pen.); Welch-Hayes 65'	Report	McAleny 52' (pen.), 89'; Piergianni 54'	Stadium: Colchester Community Stadium; Referee: Paul Howard

10 October 2020 5	Walsall	1–1	Colchester United	Walsall
15:00 BST	Adebayo 53'	Report	Harriott 24'	Stadium: Bescot Stadium; Referee: Declan Bourne

17 October 2020 6	Carlisle United	3–2	Colchester United	Carlisle
15:00 BST	Alessandra 4'; Mellish 29'; Hayden 81'	Report	Norris 44', 52' (pen.)	Stadium: Brunton Park; Referee: Martin Coy

20 October 2020 7	Colchester United	1–0	Forest Green Rovers	Colchester
19:00 BST	Chilvers 2'	Report		Stadium: Colchester Community Stadium; Referee: Carl Brook

24 October 2020 8	Colchester United	2–1	Harrogate Town	Colchester
15:00 BST	Harriott 52'; Stevenson 54'	Report	Stead 61'	Stadium: Colchester Community Stadium; Referee: Will Finnie

27 October 2020 9	Newport County	2–1	Colchester United	Newport
19:00 GMT	Twine 51'; Amond 90+1'	Report	Brown 89'	Stadium: Rodney Parade; Referee: Peter Wright

30 October 2020	Scunthorpe United	P–P	Colchester United	Scunthorpe
19:00 GMT				Stadium: Glanford Park
Note: Match postponed on 27 October 2020 due to eight Scunthorpe United players testing positive for COVID-19.

3 November 2020 10	Colchester United	3–1	Stevenage	Colchester
19:00 GMT	Brown 11', 57', 81'	Report	Dinanga 15' (pen.)	Stadium: Colchester Community Stadium; Referee: James Adcock

14 November 2020 11	Colchester United	2–1	Leyton Orient	Colchester
15:00 GMT	Brown 10', 72'	Report	Wilkinson 88'	Stadium: Colchester Community Stadium; Referee: Carl Boyeson

20 November 2020 12	Mansfield Town	1–1	Colchester United	Mansfield
19:00 GMT	Maynard 67'	Report	Norris 85'	Stadium: Field Mill; Referee: Ben Speedie

24 November 2020 13	Exeter City	6–1	Colchester United	Exeter
19:00 GMT	Jay 20', 90+5'; Randall 53'; Bowman 57', 71', 90+3'	Report	Folivi 73'	Stadium: St James Park; Referee: Trevor Kettle

1 December 2020 14	Colchester United	1–1	Crawley Town	Colchester
19:00 GMT	Harriott 13'	Report	Tunnicliffe 20'	Stadium: Colchester Community Stadium; Referee: Brett Huxtable

5 December 2020 15	Colchester United	2–1	Grimsby Town	Colchester
17:30 GMT	Smith 9'; Harriott 56'	Report	Hendrie 23'	Stadium: Colchester Community Stadium; Attendance: 1,000; Referee: Lee Swabey

8 December 2020 16	Scunthorpe United	0–1	Colchester United	Scunthorpe
19:00 GMT		Report	Smith 26'	Stadium: Glanford Park; Referee: Charles Breakspear

12 December 2020 17	Port Vale	1–1	Colchester United	Burslem
15:00 GMT	Rodney 58'	Report	Norris 65'	Stadium: Vale Park; Referee: Chris Sarginson

15 December 2020 18	Cambridge United	2–1	Colchester United	Cambridge
19:45 GMT	Mullins 50', 65'	Report	Folivi 68' (pen.)	Stadium: Abbey Stadium; Attendance: 1,949; Referee: Kevin Johnson

19 December 2020 19	Colchester United	1–2	Morecambe	Colchester
15:00 GMT	Folivi 23'	Report	O'Sullivan 8'; Songo'o 61'	Stadium: Colchester Community Stadium; Attendance: 1,094; Referee: Sam Allison

26 December 2020 20	Southend United	2–0	Colchester United	Southend-on-Sea
13:00 GMT	Akinola 10'; Dieng 22'	Report		Stadium: Roots Hall; Referee: Neil Hair

29 December 2020 21	Colchester United	0–0	Cheltenham Town	Colchester
19:45 GMT		Report		Stadium: Colchester Community Stadium; Referee: David Rock

2 January 2021	Colchester United	P–P	Tranmere Rovers	Colchester
15:00 GMT		Report		Stadium: Colchester Community Stadium
Note: Match postponed on 2 January 2021 due to players in both squads showing symptoms of COVID-19.

9 January 2021	Salford City	P–P	Colchester United	Salford
15:00 GMT		Report		Stadium: Moor Lane
Note: Match postponed on 8 January 2021 due to a frozen pitch.

16 January 2021 22	Colchester United	1–1	Cambridge United	Colchester
15:00 GMT	Taylor 39' (o.g.)	Report	Knibbs 12'	Stadium: Colchester Community Stadium; Referee: Steve Martin

23 January 2021 23	Morecambe	3–0	Colchester United	Morecambe
15:00 GMT	Phillips 45+1'; Diagouraga 58'; O'Sullivan 80'	Report	Pell (red card) 60'	Stadium: Globe Arena; Referee: Robert Lewis

26 January 2021 24	Stevenage	0–0	Colchester United	Stevenage
19:00 GMT		Report		Stadium: Broadhall Way; Referee: Paul Howard

29 January 2021 25	Colchester United	0–1	Scunthorpe United	Colchester
19:00 GMT		Report	Beestin 5'	Stadium: Colchester Community Stadium; Referee: Lee Swabey

2 February 2021	Salford City	P–P	Colchester United	Salford
19:00 GMT		Report		Stadium: Moor Lane
Note: Match postponed due to a waterlogged pitch.

6 February 2021 26	Leyton Orient	0–0	Colchester United	Leyton
15:00 GMT		Report		Stadium: Brisbane Road; Referee: Neil Hair

14 February 2021 27	Colchester United	2–2	Mansfield Town	Colchester
15:00 GMT	Harriott 39'; Nouble 89'	Report	Smith 4' (o.g.); Perch 81'	Stadium: Colchester Community Stadium; Referee: Chris Sarginson

20 February 2021 28	Crawley Town	1–0	Colchester United	Crawley
15:00 GMT	Tilly 90+3'	Report		Stadium: Broadfield Stadium; Referee: Tom Nield

23 February 2021 29	Colchester United	1–2	Exeter City	Colchester
19:00 GMT	Oteh 66'	Report	Willmott 27'; Seymour 64'	Stadium: Colchester Community Stadium; Referee: Will Finnie

27 February 2021 30	Forest Green Rovers	3–0	Colchester United	Nailsworth
17:30 GMT	Matt 25', 31'; Sarpong-Wiredu 67' (o.g.); Adams (red card) 45+2'	Report		Stadium: The New Lawn; Referee: Carl Brook

2 March 2021 31	Colchester United	2–1	Carlisle United	Colchester
19:00 GMT	Harriott 67' (pen.), 74'	Report	Mellish 29'	Stadium: Colchester Community Stadium; Referee: Trevor Kettle

6 March 2021 32	Colchester United	0–2	Newport County	Colchester
15:00 GMT	Nouble (yellow card) 74' (yellow-red card) 76'	Report	Labadie 30'; Amond 78'	Stadium: Colchester Community Stadium; Referee: Antony Coggins

9 March 2021 33	Harrogate Town	3–0	Colchester United	Harrogate
19:00 GMT	Beck 1'; Smith 45+1'; McPake 56'	Report		Stadium: Wetherby Road; Referee: Simon Mather

13 March 2021 34	Grimsby Town	0–0	Colchester United	Cleethorpes
17:30 GMT		Report		Stadium: Blundell Park; Referee: Marc Edwards

16 March 2021 35	Salford City	0–0	Colchester United	Salford
19:00 GMT		Report		Stadium: Moor Lane; Referee: Scott Oldham

20 March 2021 36	Colchester United	0–1	Port Vale	Colchester
15:00 GMT		Report	Rodney 19'	Stadium: Colchester Community Stadium; Referee: Bobby Madley

23 March 2021 37	Colchester United	2–2	Tranmere Rovers	Colchester
19:00 GMT	Pell 30'; Sarpong-Wiredu 55'	Report	Lloyd 62' (pen.); Spearing 67'	Stadium: Colchester Community Stadium; Referee: Declan Bourne

27 March 2021 38	Colchester United	1–2	Bradford City	Colchester
15:00 GMT	Nouble 42'	Report	Scales 10'; Cook 58'	Stadium: Colchester Community Stadium; Referee: Graham Salisbury

2 April 2021 39	Bolton Wanderers	0–0	Colchester United	Horwich
13:00 BST		Report		Stadium: University of Bolton Stadium; Referee: Ollie Yates

5 April 2021 40	Colchester United	1–1	Barrow	Colchester
15:00 BST	Harriott 33'	Report	Beadling 88'	Stadium: Colchester Community Stadium; Referee: John Busby

9 April 2021 41	Oldham Athletic	5–2	Colchester United	Oldham
19:00 BST	McAleny 37' (pen.); McCalmont 42'; Piergianni 46'; Keillor-Dunn 90', 90+5'	Report	Nouble 64'; Eastman 81'	Stadium: Boundary Park; Referee: Martin Coy

17 April 2021 42	Colchester United	2–1	Walsall	Colchester
17:30 BST	Folivi 37'; Clampin 45+4'	Report	Clarke 20'	Stadium: Colchester Community Stadium; Referee: Carl Boyeson

20 April 2021 43	Colchester United	2–0	Southend United	Colchester
19:00 BST	Folivi 30'; Pell 37'	Report	Demetriou (red card) 69'	Stadium: Colchester Community Stadium; Referee: Kevin Johnson

24 April 2021 44	Cheltenham Town	1–0	Colchester United	Cheltenham
15:00 BST	Thomas 82'	Report		Stadium: Whaddon Road; Referee: Paul Howard

1 May 2021 45	Colchester United	1–0	Salford City	Colchester
15:00 BST	Bohui 68'	Report	Bernard (yellow card) 15' (yellow-red card) 32'; Hunter (yellow card) 90+5' (red card)	Stadium: Colchester Community Stadium; Referee: Leigh Doughty

8 May 2021 46	Tranmere Rovers	0–0	Colchester United	Birkenhead
15:00 BST		Report		Stadium: Prenton Park; Referee: James Bell

=== FA Cup ===
The draw for the first round was made on 26 October 2020.

7 November 2020 First round	Colchester United	1–1 (a.e.t.) (3–5 p)	Marine	Colchester
15:00 GMT	Pell 64'	Report	Miley 22'	Stadium: Colchester Community Stadium; Referee: Sam Allison
	Penalties
	Pell (penalty scored); Chilvers (penalty scored); Brown (penalty scored); Bohui (penalty missed)		Touray (penalty scored); Hughes (penalty scored); Kengni (penalty scored); Raven (penalty scored); Devine (penalty scored)

=== EFL Cup ===
The first round draw for the EFL Cup was made on 18 August 2020.

5 September 2020 First round	Reading	3–1	Colchester United	Reading
15:00 BST	João 45+1', 56', 75'	Report	Brown 37'	Stadium: Madejski Stadium; Referee: Josh Smith

=== EFL Trophy ===
The regional group stage draw for the EFL Trophy was confirmed on 18 August 2020.

Pos	Div	Team	Pld	W	PW	PL	L	GF	GA	GD	Pts	Qualification
1	ACA	West Ham United U21	3	3	0	0	0	5	1	+4	9	Advance to Round 2
2	L1	Portsmouth	3	2	0	0	1	5	1	+4	6	Advance to Round 2
3	L2	Colchester United	3	1	0	0	2	6	4	+2	3	
4	L2	Southend United	3	0	0	0	3	2	12	−10	0	

Source: EFL.com

8 September 2020 Group stage	Portsmouth	2–0	Colchester United	Portsmouth
19:00 BST	Harness 37', 38'	Report		Stadium: Fratton Park; Referee: Craig Hicks

29 September 2020 Group stage	Colchester United	0–1	West Ham United U21	Colchester
19:00 BST		Report	Coventry 61'	Stadium: Colchester Community Stadium; Referee: Sam Purkiss

10 November 2020 Group stage	Colchester United	6–1	Southend United	Colchester
19:00 GMT	Brown 16', 38', 57' (pen.); Folivi 62'; Chilvers 70'; Poku 83'	Report	Sterling 90+2'	Stadium: Colchester Community Stadium; Referee: Alan Young

== Squad statistics ==
=== Appearances and goals ===
As of 8 May 2021

No.	Pos	Nat	Player	Total		League Two		FA Cup		EFL Cup		EFL Trophy	
No.	Pos	Nat	Player	Apps	Goals	Apps	Goals	Apps	Goals	Apps	Goals	Apps	Goals
1	GK	(England) ENG	Dean Gerken	35	0	33	0	1	0	1	0	0	0
2	DF	(England) ENG	Miles Welch-Hayes	42	1	35+3	1	1	0	0	0	2+1	0
4	MF	(England) ENG	Tom Lapslie	13	0	6+7	0	0	0	0	0	0	0
5	DF	(New Zealand) NZL	Tommy Smith	47	2	45	2	0+1	0	1	0	0	0
6	DF	(England) ENG	Omar Sowunmi	19	0	8+7	0	1	0	0	0	3	0
7	FW	(England) ENG	Courtney Senior	39	0	23+12	0	1	0	0+1	0	2	0
8	MF	(England) ENG	Harry Pell	28	3	24+1	2	1	1	1	0	1	0
10	MF	(Jamaica) JAM	Jevani Brown	45	11	28+12	7	1	0	1	1	2+1	3
11	FW	(Guyana) GUY	Callum Harriott	38	9	33+3	9	1	0	1	0	0	0
12	FW	(England) ENG	Paris Cowan-Hall	15	0	2+11	0	0	0	0	0	1+1	0
14	MF	(England) ENG	Noah Chilvers	49	3	36+8	2	1	0	1	0	3	1
18	DF	(England) ENG	Tom Eastman	49	2	45	2	1	0	1	0	2	0
21	DF	(England) ENG	Ryan Clampin	22	1	17+4	1	0	0	0	0	1	0
22	MF	(England) ENG	Brendan Sarpong-Wiredu	20	1	19+1	1	0	0	0	0	0	0
23	MF	(Ghana) GHA	Kwame Poku	37	1	27+6	0	1	0	1	0	2	1
24	MF	(England) ENG	Ben Stevenson	34	2	26+6	2	0	0	1	0	1	0
26	FW	(Malta) MLT	Luke Gambin	13	0	6+5	0	0	0	0	0	2	0
29	GK	(England) ENG	Shamal George	18	0	13+2	0	0	0	0	0	3	0
33	MF	(England) ENG	Marley Marshall-Miranda	5	0	0+1	0	0	0	0+1	0	0+3	0
34	FW	(England) ENG	Samson Tovide	1	0	0	0	0	0	0	0	0+1	0
35	DF	(England) ENG	Billy Cracknell	1	0	0+1	0	0	0	0	0	0	0
36	DF	(England) ENG	Harvey Sayer	5	0	0+4	0	0	0	0	0	0+1	0
37	FW	(England) ENG	Joshua Bohui	15	1	0+13	1	0+1	0	0	0	1	0
38	DF	(England) ENG	Junior Tchamadeu	11	0	8+3	0	0	0	0	0	0	0
39	FW	(England) ENG	Michael Folivi	29	6	12+15	5	0+1	0	0	0	1	1
42	FW	(England) ENG	Tom Stagg	1	0	0+1	0	0	0	0	0	0	0
Players who appeared for Colchester who left during the season
3	DF	(England) ENG	Cohen Bramall	25	0	23	0	1	0	1	0	0	0
3	DF	(Northern Ireland) NIR	Josh Doherty	5	0	4+1	0	0	0	0	0	0	0
9	FW	(England) ENG	Luke Norris	18	4	7+10	4	0	0	0	0	1	0
9	FW	(England) ENG	Aramide Oteh	13	1	4+9	1	0	0	0	0	0	0
15	FW	(England) ENG	Martell Taylor-Crossdale	1	0	0	0	0	0	0	0	0+1	0
17	DF	(England) ENG	Miquel Scarlett	7	0	2+1	0	0	0	1	0	3	0
19	DF	(England) ENG	Ollie Kensdale	1	0	0	0	0	0	0	0	1	0
31	MF	(England) ENG	Sammie McLeod	2	0	0+1	0	0	0	0	0	1	0
45	FW	(England) ENG	Frank Nouble	20	3	20	3	0	0	0	0	0	0

=== Goalscorers ===
Place	Number	Nation	Position	Name	League Two	FA Cup	EFL Cup	EFL Trophy	Total
1	10	(Jamaica)	AM	Jevani Brown	7	0	1	3	11
2	11	(Guyana)	WG	Callum Harriott	9	0	0	0	9
3	39	(England)	FW	Michael Folivi	5	0	0	1	6
4	9	(England)	CF	Luke Norris	4	0	0	0	4
5	8	(England)	MF	Harry Pell	2	1	0	0	3
5	14	(England)	AM	Noah Chilvers	2	0	0	1	3
5	45	(England)	CF	Frank Nouble	3	0	0	0	3
8	5	(England)	CB	Tommy Smith	2	0	0	0	2
8	18	(England)	CB	Tom Eastman	2	0	0	0	2
8	24	(England)	MF	Ben Stevenson	2	0	0	0	2
11	2	(England)	RB	Miles Welch-Hayes	1	0	0	0	1
11	9	(England)	ST	Aramide Oteh	1	0	0	0	1
11	21	(England)	LB/LW	Ryan Clampin	1	0	0	0	1
11	22	(England)	MF	Brendan Sarpong-Wiredu	1	0	0	0	1
11	23	(Ghana)	MF	Kwame Poku	0	0	0	1	1
11	37	(England)	FW	Joshua Bohui	1	0	0	0	1
				Own goals	1	0	0	0	1
				TOTALS	44	1	1	6	52

=== Disciplinary record ===
Number	Nationality	Position	Player	League Two		FA Cup		EFL Cup		EFL Trophy		Total	
Number	Nationality	Position	Player	Booked	Sent off (straight red)	Booked	Sent off (straight red)	Booked	Sent off (straight red)	Booked	Sent off (straight red)	Booked	Sent off (straight red)
8	(England)	MF	Harry Pell	8	1	0	0	0	0	0	0	8	1
18	(England)	CB	Tom Eastman	9	0	0	0	0	0	0	0	9	0
2	(England)	RB	Miles Welch-Hayes	7	0	0	0	0	0	0	0	7	0
5	(New Zealand)	CB	Tommy Smith	6	0	1	0	0	0	0	0	7	0
11	(Guyana)	WG	Callum Harriott	7	0	0	0	0	0	0	0	7	0
24	(England)	MF	Ben Stevenson	6	0	0	0	0	0	0	0	6	0
7	(England)	WG	Courtney Senior	5	0	0	0	0	0	0	0	5	0
14	(England)	AM	Noah Chilvers	4	0	1	0	0	0	0	0	5	0
45	(England)	CF	Frank Nouble	1	1	0	0	0	0	0	0	1	1
3	(England)	LB	Cohen Bramall	3	0	0	0	0	0	0	0	3	0
4	(England)	CM	Tom Lapslie	3	0	0	0	0	0	0	0	3	0
9	(England)	CF	Luke Norris	3	0	0	0	0	0	0	0	3	0
10	(Jamaica)	AM	Jevani Brown	3	0	0	0	0	0	0	0	3	0
22	(England)	MF	Brendan Sarpong-Wiredu	3	0	0	0	0	0	0	0	3	0
21	(England)	LB/LW	Ryan Clampin	2	0	0	0	0	0	0	0	2	0
26	(Malta)	WG	Luke Gambin	2	0	0	0	0	0	0	0	2	0
3	(Northern Ireland)	LB	Josh Doherty	1	0	0	0	0	0	0	0	1	0
6	(England)	CB	Omar Sowunmi	0	0	0	0	0	0	1	0	1	0
9	(England)	ST	Aramide Oteh	1	0	0	0	0	0	0	0	1	0
12	(England)	WG	Paris Cowan-Hall	1	0	0	0	0	0	0	0	1	0
29	(England)	GK	Shamal George	1	0	0	0	0	0	0	0	1	0
31	(England)	MF	Sammie McLeod	0	0	0	0	0	0	1	0	1	0
33	(England)	MF	Marley Marshall-Miranda	0	0	0	0	0	0	1	0	1	0
38	(England)	RB	Junior Tchamadeu	1	0	0	0	0	0	0	0	1	0
39	(England)	FW	Michael Folivi	1	0	0	0	0	0	0	0	1	0
			TOTALS	77	2	2	0	0	0	3	0	82	2

=== Player debuts ===
Players making their first-team Colchester United debut in a fully competitive match.

Number	Position	Player	Date	Opponent	Ground	Notes
5	CB	(New Zealand) Tommy Smith	5 September 2020	Reading	Madejski Stadium	(Note: Second debut for the club.)
17	RB/MF	(England) Miquel Scarlett	5 September 2020	Reading	Madejski Stadium	
33	MF	(England) Marley Marshall-Miranda	5 September 2020	Reading	Madejski Stadium	
29	GK	(England) Shamal George	8 September 2020	Portsmouth	Fratton Park	
15	CF	(England) Martell Taylor-Crossdale	8 September 2020	Portsmouth	Fratton Park	
31	MF	(England) Sammie McLeod	19 September 2020	Bolton Wanderers	Colchester Community Stadium	
36	LB	(England) Harvey Sayer	29 September 2020	West Ham United U21	Colchester Community Stadium	
37	FW	(England) Joshua Bohui	10 October 2020	Walsall	Bescot Stadium	
39	FW	(England) Michael Folivi	3 November 2020	Stevenage	Colchester Community Stadium	
34	CF	(England) Samson Tovide	10 November 2020	Southend United	Colchester Community Stadium	
38	RB	(England) Junior Tchamadeu	5 December 2020	Grimsby Town	Colchester Community Stadium	
9	ST	(England) Aramide Oteh	23 January 2021	Morecambe	Globe Arena	
3	LB	(Northern Ireland) Josh Doherty	6 February 2021	Leyton Orient	Brisbane Road	
22	MF	(England) Brendan Sarpong-Wiredu	6 February 2021	Leyton Orient	Brisbane Road	
45	CF	(England) Frank Nouble	6 February 2021	Leyton Orient	Brisbane Road	
35	DF	(England) Billy Cracknell	3 March 2021	Carlisle United	Colchester Community Stadium	
42	CF	(England) Tom Stagg	8 May 2021	Tranmere Rovers	Prenton Park	

== Honours and awards ==
=== End-of-season awards ===
Award	Player	Notes
Player of the Year award	(England) Noah Chilvers	
Young Player of the Year award	(England) Noah Chilvers	
Player's Player of the Year award	(Guyana) Callum Harriott	
Goal of the Season award	(England) Noah Chilvers	
Hospital Radio Player of the Year award	(England) Harry Pell	
Colchester United Supporters Association Player of the Year award	(England) Tom Eastman	

== See also ==
- List of Colchester United F.C. seasons
