= Tom Stagg =

Tom Stagg may refer to:

- Tom Stagg (judge)
- Tom Stagg (footballer)
- Thomas O. Staggs, former Disney executive
