= Joshua Bohui =

English footballer (born 1999)

Personal information
- Full name: Joshua Raymond Bohui
- Date of birth: 3 March 1999 (age 27)
- Place of birth: London, England
- Height: 1.80 m (5 ft 11 in)
- Position: Forward

Team information
- Current team: SE Dons

Youth career
- –2011: Evolution Sports & Health Academy
- 2011–2016: Brentford
- 2016–2019: Manchester United

Senior career*
Years	Team	Apps	(Gls)
2019–2020	NAC Breda	8	(1)
2020–2021	Colchester United	13	(1)
2021	Waltham Abbey	0	(0)
2021–2022	Hayes & Yeading United	2	(0)
2022	Leatherhead	4	(1)
2022	Chesham United	1	(0)
2022	Dorking Wanderers B	9	(5)
2022	Cheshunt	1	(0)
2022–2023	Sevenoaks Town	12	(1)
2024	Wasquehal	1	(0)
2025–2026	AFC Whyteleafe	3	(0)
2026–	SE Dons	8	(2)

International career
2016	England U17	3	(0)
- * Club domestic league appearances and goals as of 17:35, 2 August 2026 (UTC)

Joshua Raymond Bohui (born 3 March 1999) is an English professional footballer who plays as a forward for Southern Counties East League First Division club SE Dons.

Bohui is a product of the Brentford and Manchester United academies and began his senior career in the Netherlands with NAC Breda. Following a spell with EFL club Colchester United, he dropped into non-League football in 2021. He was capped by England at U17 level.

== Club career ==
=== Youth career: Brentford and Manchester United ===
After beginning his youth career at the Evolution Sports & Health Academy in London, Bohui entered the youth system at Brentford in 2011. He progressed through the youth ranks and was part of the U15 team which won the Junior Globe at the 2014 Milk Cup. He made his youth team debut during the 2014–15 season and scored two goals in 12 appearances. Bohui signed a scholarship deal at the end of the 2014–15 season and scored nine goals in 22 appearances for the youth team during the 2015–16 season. He also broke into the Development Squad, making 13 appearances and scoring one goal. Due to the closure of the Brentford academy at the end of the 2015–16 season, Bohui had his contract terminated by mutual consent on 28 July 2016.

On 7 August 2016, Bohui joined the academy at Manchester United on a three-year contract. He progressed through the U18 team to the club's U23 team, but he twice rejected a new four-year contract and was released when his contract expired at the end of the 2018–19 season.

=== NAC Breda ===
On 5 July 2019, Bohui moved to the Netherlands to join Eerste Divisie club NAC Breda on a two-year contract, with the option of two further years. A knee injury suffered that same month kept him out until November 2019 and he made four appearances before the 2019–20 season was ended early. Bohui was transfer-listed in June 2020, but he began the 2020–21 season with four appearances and one goal, prior to his contract being terminated by mutual consent on 5 October 2020.

=== Colchester United ===
On 10 October 2020, Bohui returned to England to sign a contract with League Two club Colchester United on a free transfer. He made 13 appearances before being dropped from manager Steve Ball's matchday squads in mid-January 2021. Bohui returned to the substitutes' bench in late April and scored his first goal for the club on his first appearance for nearly five months, with the only goal of the game versus Salford City on 1 May, which secured the Us' League Two status. He ended the season with 15 appearances and one goal and was released when his contract expired.

=== Non-League football ===
In September 2021, Bohui transferred to Southern League First Division Central club Waltham Abbey. He made a single first team appearance and transferred to Southern League Premier Division South club Hayes & Yeading United on 23 November 2021. He made just two appearances in five weeks with Hayes & Yeading United and departed to join Isthmian League Premier Division club Leatherhead in January 2022. Following four appearances and a friendly appearance on trial for League of Ireland Premier Division club Sligo Rovers in February 2022, Bohui made a single appearance for Southern League Premier Division South club Chesham United in March 2022.

Bohui began the 2022–23 season with Southern Combination League First Division club Dorking Wanderers B. After scoring five goals in nine appearances, he transferred to National League South club Cheshunt on 7 October 2022. After making just one appearance, Bohui transferred to Isthmian League South East Division club Sevenoaks Town later that month. He finished the season with 14 appearances and one goal, but did not appear past mid-January 2023.

=== Europe ===
In March 2024, Bohui joined Finnish Veikkausliiga club TPS on trial and made one League Cup appearance. In December 2024, Bohui made one appearance for French Championnat National 2 club Wasquehal.

=== Return to non-League football ===
Bohui returned to football with Isthmian League South East Division club AFC Whyteleafe in December 2025, for whom he made four appearances. Bohui made seven appearances and scored two goals for Southern Counties East League First Division club SE Dons during the final months of the 2025–26 season, but he was not involved in the club's successful playoff campaign.

== International career ==
Bohui is eligible to play for England, France or Ivory Coast at international level. He was invited to a training camp with the England under-16 team in January 2015 and won three caps for the under-17s during the second half of the 2015–16 season, with two coming during the Young Lions' unsuccessful 2016 UEFA European Under-17 Championship campaign.

== Personal life ==
Bohui was born to an English mother and an Ivorian father. He attended Ark Evelyn Grace Academy.

== Career statistics ==
As of match played 1 August 2026

Appearances and goals by club, season and competition
Club	Season	League			National cup (Note: Includes KNVB Cup, FA Cup)		League cup (Note: Includes Finnish League Cup)		Other		Total	
Club	Season	Division	Apps	Goals	Apps	Goals	Apps	Goals	Apps	Goals	Apps	Goals
NAC Breda	2019–20	Eerste Divisie	4	0	0	0	―		―		4	0
NAC Breda	2020–21	Eerste Divisie	4	1	―		―		―		4	1
NAC Breda	Total		8	1	0	0	―		―		8	1
Colchester United	2020–21	League Two	13	1	1	0	―		1 (Note: Appearance in EFL Trophy)	0	15	1
Waltham Abbey	2021–22	Southern League First Division Central	0	0	―		―		1 (Note: Appearance in Southern League Cup)	0	1	0
Hayes & Yeading United	2021–22	Southern League Premier Division South	2	0	―		―		0	0	2	0
Leatherhead	2021–22	Isthmian League Premier Division	4	1	―		―		―		4	1
Chesham United	2021–22	Southern League Premier Division South	1	0	―		―		―		1	0
Dorking Wanderers B	2022–23	Southern Combination League First Division	9	5	―		―		―		9	5
Cheshunt	2022–23	National League South	1	0	―		―		―		1	0
Sevenoaks Town	2022–23	Isthmian League South East Division	12	1	―		―		2 (Note: Appearances in Isthmian League Cup)	0	14	1
TPS	2024	―					1	0	―		1	0
Wasquehal	2024–25	Championnat National 2 Group C	1	0	―		―		―		1	0
AFC Whyteleafe	2025–26	Isthmian League South East Division	3	0	―		―		1 (Note: Appearance in Surrey Senior Cup)	0	4	0
SE Dons	2025–26	Southern Counties East League First Division	7	2	―		―		0	0	7	2
SE Dons	2026–27	Southern Counties East League First Division	1	0	0	0	―		0	0	1	0
SE Dons	Total		8	2	0	0	―		0	0	8	2
Career total			62	11	1	0	1	0	5	0	69	11
