= Aramide Oteh =

English footballer

Personal information
- Full name: Aramide Jay Oteh
- Date of birth: 10 September 1998 (age 28)
- Place of birth: Lee, England
- Height: 5 ft 9 in (1.76 m)
- Position: Forward

Team information
- Current team: Dagenham & Redbridge
- Number: 16

Youth career
- c. 2006–2017: Tottenham Hotspur
- 2017: → Queens Park Rangers (work experience)

Senior career*
| Years | Team | Apps | (Gls) |
| 2017–2021 | Queens Park Rangers | 17 | (1) |
| 2019 | → Walsall (loan) | 13 | (1) |
| 2019–2020 | → Bradford City (loan) | 18 | (3) |
| 2020–2021 | → Stevenage (loan) | 13 | (4) |
| 2021 | → Colchester United (loan) | 13 | (1) |
| 2021–2022 | Salford City | 10 | (1) |
| 2022–2023 | Crawley Town | 38 | (7) |
| 2023–2024 | Walsall | 11 | (2) |
| 2024–2025 | The New Saints | 32 | (13) |
| 2025–2026 | Braintree Town | 2 | (1) |
| 2026– | Dagenham & Redbridge | 1 | (1) |
- * Club domestic league appearances and goals as of 19:55, 7 February 2026, 19:55UTC)

Aramide Jay Oteh (born 10 September 1998) is an English footballer who plays as a forward for Dagenham & Redbridge.

Oteh began his career with the Academy of Tottenham Hotspur, before he was released in 2017 having made no appearances for the club's first team. Having previously spent time with the club on a work experience loan, he then signed permanently for Queens Park Rangers, where he made his professional debut in 2017. Oteh spent the majority of his time at the club out on loan, having spells with Walsall, Bradford City, Stevenage, and Colchester United. After four years with QPR, he was released by the club in 2021, before signing for Salford on a short-term contract.

== Club career ==
=== Tottenham Hotspur ===
Born in Lee, London and of Nigerian descent, Oteh began his career with the Tottenham Hotspur Academy, first playing in the under-8s. Oteh was profiled for Tottenham's website in 2015, where he spoke of his desire to emulate former Tottenham striker Jermain Defoe due to his movement and his ability to score goals, and said he enjoyed watching Harry Kane train due to his finishing skills and his physical strength. On 18 January 2017, Oteh joined fellow London team Queens Park Rangers on a work experience loan. His Tottenham contract was terminated by mutual consent on 27 February at the age of 18.

=== Queens Park Rangers ===
On 5 May 2017, Oteh signed for QPR on a permanent basis. His form for QPR's Under-23 team led him to be considered for a place in the first team, and he made his professional debut as a 69th-minute substitute for Bright Osayi-Samuel in a 1–0 defeat to Millwall at The Den on 29 December. After the match, Oteh said that "it's up to me to keep improving and showing the manager what I'm capable of". He scored his first senior goal in a 3–1 away win against Burton Albion on 13 January 2018, after which QPR manager Ian Holloway said it was "exciting" to have players such as Oteh in his team. Oteh scored 16 goals during the 2017–18 for QPR's Under-23 team, and he was nominated for the QPR Young Player of the Year award at the end of the 2017–18 season. Oteh's performances in his first season at the club lead to him signing a new three-year contract with The R's in September, and he praised coaches Chris Ramsey and Les Ferdinand for helping him develop as a player.

On 6 January 2019, he scored the opening goal from the penalty spot in QPR's 2–1 FA Cup win against Leeds United, receiving praise from manager Steve McClaren for displaying "great courage, a great mentality"; it was QPR's first outright win in the FA Cup since 1997. At the end of the 2018–19 season, Oteh was again nominated for QPR's Young Player of the Year award. On 20 May 2021, Oteh was released by QPR at the expiry of his contract, having scored two goals in 22 appearances in all competitions.

==== Walsall and Bradford City loans ====
On 30 January 2019, Oteh joined EFL League One team Walsall on a loan deal until the end of the 2018–19 season, and made his debut for the club in a defeat to Rochdale on 2 February. Walsall manager Dean Keates described Oteh as a player with "really good pedigree", and credited QPR coach Paul Hall in helping orchestrate the move, with Walsall winning out over Southend United. His first and only goal for the club came on 19 April, when he scored a last minute penalty to equalise in a 1–1 draw with Southend United, helping break The Saddlers six-match losing streak. Walsall were relegated at the end of the season, with local newspaper Express & Star saying he hadn't had the "desired impact" to help in their survival battle.

It's just nice to be around it. He's got so much knowledge and offers great advice on the pitch... It's massive for me. They've played hundreds of games and had good careers, so it's good to learn off those two. They are good pros on and off the pitch and I like to be in and around them.

— Oteh discussing learning from Bradford City strikers James Vaughan and Clayton Donaldson

On 2 September he signed on loan for EFL League Two team Bradford City. Bradford manager Gary Bowyer said that he expected Oteh to make a "massive contribution" as back up to strikers James Vaughan and Clayton Donaldson. He scored his first goal for the club in a 2–1 win against Morecambe on 12 October, and credited Vaughan and Donaldson as being role models and helping him improve his game. Following an injury to Donaldson, Oteh began playing more regularly, and by December Bowyer had noted his progress, while admitting there was still room for improvement, saying "he's certainly done better on his second loan but I still think he can push himself harder. We've spoken to him and he's aware of that". He scored his final goal for the club on 1 January 2020, coming on as a substitute to score the winner 11 minutes from time in a 1–0 win against Morecambe. He was recalled by QPR on 31 January 2020, having scored five goals for Bradford.

==== Stevenage and Colchester United loans ====
On 16 October 2020, Oteh signed on loan for League Two team Stevenage on a season-long loan. After initially being used as a substitute for Stevenage, he found his way into the starting line-up, and scored the equaliser against Morecambe in a 1–1 draw on 14 November, and after scoring in a 2–1 win over Port Vale 10 days later, noted that he was enjoying his strike partnership with Danny Newton due to their contrasting styles. However, having scored four goals in 13 appearances, Oteh was recalled early from his loan by QPR in January 2021.

On 19 January 2021, Oteh joined League Two team Colchester United on loan for the remainder of the 2020-21 season, having been a target prior to his loan to Stevenage. He scored his first goal for The U's in a 2–1 defeat to Exeter City, and described it as a "bittersweet" moment. He finished his loan at Colchester with one goal in 13 appearances. Manager Hayden Mullins, Oteh's third manager in his time at Colchester, later said he had been unlucky not to have made more appearances due to the form of strike pairing Michael Folivi and Frank Nouble.

=== Salford City ===
Following his release by QPR, Oteh went on trial with League One side Doncaster Rovers in July 2021, and was being monitored by Coventry City and Derby County. On 25 September, he signed for League Two side Salford City on a short-term contract until January 2022. He made his debut on the same day, coming on as a second-half substitute in a league match against Northampton Town. His first goal for the club came on 3 November, giving Salford a 3–2 lead in an eventual 5–3 win against Leeds United U21s in the EFL Trophy.

=== Crawley Town ===
In February 2022, Oteh joined League Two side Crawley Town on a free transfer following his release by Salford. Manager John Yems expressed his joy at signing Oteh, saying he had a "point to prove". His first goal for the club came on 8 February, scoring the opening goal in a 3–1 win against Harrogate Town, Crawley's first ever win over Harrogate.

=== Walsall ===
On 24 July 2023, Oteh returned to Walsall, this time on a permanent transfer from Crawley.

=== The New Saints ===
On 13 September 2024, Oteh signed for Cymru Premier club The New Saints. Oteh finished the season as the club's top goalscorer with 18 goals, as they won the treble.

In July 2025, Oteh was racially abused by a fan in a match against FK Shkendija.

He left the club by mutual consent in November 2025.

=== Scunthorpe United ===
On 2 December 2025, Oteh joined National League club Scunthorpe United on non-contract terms in order to play as a trialist in their National League Cup game against Newcastle United. Oteh played the full 90 minutes, where he scored the first goal of the game.

=== Braintree Town ===
Oteh signed for Braintree Town on 26 December 2025. Oteh made his first start for Braintree Town against Woking F.C, where he scored the only goal of the game.

=== Dagenham and Redbridge ===
In February 2026, Oteh for National League South side Dagenham and Redbridge on a contract to end of the season. On the same day, Oteh made his debut and scored his first goal for the club in a 4-2 victory over Chippenham Town.

== Style of play ==
Oteh is a versatile attacking player capable of playing in numerous positions and roles. His preference is to play as a centre-forward, but can play as a winger or a second striker.

== Personal life ==
Born in England, Oteh is of Nigerian and Jamaican descent.

== Career statistics ==
As of 30 December 2025

Appearances and goals by club, season and competition
| Club | Season | League | | | National Cup | | League Cup | | Other | | Total | |
| Club | Season | Division | Apps | Goals | Apps | Goals | Apps | Goals | Apps | Goals | Apps | Goals |
|---|---|---|---|---|---|---|---|---|---|---|---|---|
| Queens Park Rangers | 2017–18 | Championship | 6 | 1 | 0 | 0 | 0 | 0 | 0 | 0 | 6 | 1 |
| Queens Park Rangers | 2018–19 | Championship | 2 | 0 | 2 | 1 | 1 | 0 | 0 | 0 | 5 | 1 |
| Queens Park Rangers | 2019–20 | Championship | 9 | 0 | 0 | 0 | 0 | 0 | 0 | 0 | 9 | 0 |
| Queens Park Rangers | 2020–21 | Championship | 0 | 0 | 0 | 0 | 1 | 0 | 0 | 0 | 1 | 0 |
| Queens Park Rangers | Total | | 17 | 1 | 2 | 1 | 2 | 0 | 0 | 0 | 21 | 2 |
| Walsall (loan) | 2018–19 | League One | 13 | 1 | 0 | 0 | 0 | 0 | 0 | 0 | 13 | 1 |
| Bradford City (loan) | 2019–20 | League Two | 18 | 3 | 2 | 1 | 0 | 0 | 2 (Note: Appearance(s) in EFL Trophy) | 0 | 23 | 4 |
| Stevenage (loan) | 2020–21 | League Two | 13 | 4 | 3 | 0 | 0 | 0 | 0 | 0 | 16 | 4 |
| Colchester United (loan) | 2020–21 | League Two | 13 | 1 | – | | – | | 0 | 0 | 13 | 1 |
| Salford City | 2021–22 | League Two | 10 | 1 | 2 | 0 | 0 | 0 | 2 | 1 | 14 | 2 |
| Crawley Town | 2021–22 | League Two | 8 | 2 | 0 | 0 | 0 | 0 | 0 | 0 | 8 | 2 |
| Crawley Town | 2022–23 | League Two | 30 | 5 | 1 | 0 | 2 | 0 | 2 | 2 | 35 | 7 |
| Crawley Town | Total | | 38 | 7 | 1 | 0 | 2 | 0 | 2 | 2 | 43 | 9 |
| Walsall | 2023–24 | League Two | 13 | 2 | 0 | 0 | 1 | 0 | 1 | 0 | 15 | 2 |
| The New Saints | 2024–25 | Cymru Premier | 27 | 13 | 4 | 2 | 3 | 3 | 0 | 0 | 34 | 18 |
| The New Saints | 2025–26 | Cymru Premier | 5 | 0 | 0 | 0 | 1 | 2 | 4 (Note: Two appearances in UEFA Champions League, two appearances in UEFA Conference League) | 0 | 10 | 2 |
| The New Saints | Total | | 32 | 13 | 4 | 2 | 4 | 5 | 4 | 0 | 44 | 20 |
| Scunthorpe United | 2025–26 | National League | 0 | 0 | 0 | 0 | 0 | 0 | 1 (Note: Appearances in National League Cup) | 1 | 1 | 1 |
| Braintree Town | 2025–26 | National League | 2 | 1 | 0 | 0 | 0 | 0 | 0 | 0 | 2 | 1 |
| Career total | | | 169 | 34 | 14 | 4 | 9 | 5 | 12 | 4 | 204 | 47 |
