= Miquel Scarlett =

Guyanese footballer

Personal information
- Full name: Miquel Howard Hugh Scarlett
- Date of birth: 27 September 2000 (age 26)
- Place of birth: Lambeth, London, England
- Height: 1.80 m (5 ft 11 in)
- Positions: Right back; midfielder

Team information
- Current team: Ashford United

Youth career
- 2017–2018: Gillingham

Senior career*
Years	Team	Apps	(Gls)
2018–2019	Gillingham	0	(0)
2019	→ Sheppey United (loan)	6	(0)
2019–2021	Colchester United	3	(0)
2021	Dulwich Hamlet	0	(0)
2022–2023	Eastbourne Borough	28	(1)
2023–2024	Dulwich Hamlet	9	(0)
2024–2025	Chatham Town	28	(0)
2025	Folkestone Invicta	10	(0)
2025–	Ashford United	4	(0)

International career^{‡}
2021–	Guyana	4	(0)
- * Club domestic league appearances and goals as of 11:40, 8 September 2025 (UTC) ‡ National team caps and goals as of 23:59, 8 June 2021 (UTC)

Miquel Howard Hugh Scarlett (born 27 September 2000) is a footballer who plays as a right back for Isthmian League South East Division club Ashford United. Born in England, he plays for the Guyana national team.

== Club career ==
Born in Lambeth, London, Scarlett signed his first professional contract with Gillingham in summer 2019. He made his professional debut for Gillingham on 4 September 2018 in their 4–0 EFL Trophy defeat to Portsmouth, coming on as a substitute for Alex Lacey after 80 minutes.

In January 2019, Scarlett was sent out on work experience loan to Sheppey United, where he went on to make seven first-team appearances.

On 2 September 2019, Gillingham announced that Scarlett's contract with the club had been cancelled. He later signed for Colchester United, first featuring for their under-23 side in November 2019.

Scarlett made his Colchester United debut on 5 September 2020, starting in their 3–1 EFL Cup defeat to Reading. He then made his English Football League debut in Colchester's 1–1 draw at Walsall on 10 October.

Colchester announced that Scarlett was one of seven under-23 players who had their contract terminated by mutual consent on 1 February 2021.

Following a season with Eastbourne Borough, Scarlett rejoined Isthmian League Premier Division side Dulwich Hamlet ahead of the 2023–24 season. In January 2024, he joined Chatham Town. In February 2025, he joined Folkestone Invicta.

On 5 August 2025, Scarlett joined Isthmian League South East Division club Ashford United.

== International career ==
Born in England, Miquel is of Guyanese descent. He made his debut for Guyana national football team on 25 March 2021 in a World Cup qualifier against Trinidad and Tobago.

== Career statistics ==
=== Club ===
As of end of 2024–25 season

Appearances and goals by club, season and competition
Club	Season	League			FA Cup		League Cup		Other		Total	
Club	Season	Division	Apps	Goals	Apps	Goals	Apps	Goals	Apps	Goals	Apps	Goals
Gillingham	2018–19	League One	0	0	0	0	0	0	1 (Note: Appearance(s) in EFL Trophy)	0	1	0
Gillingham	2019–20	League One	0	0	0	0	0	0	0	0	0	0
Gillingham	Total		0	0	0	0	0	0	1	0	1	0
Sheppey United (loan)	2018–19	SCEFL Premier Division	6	0	0	0	—		1 (Note: Appearance(s) in SCEFL Challenge Cup)	0	7	0
Colchester United	2019–20	League Two	0	0	0	0	0	0	0	0	0	0
Colchester United	2020–21	League Two	3	0	0	0	1	0	3	0	7	0
Colchester United	Total		3	0	0	0	1	0	3	0	7	0
Dulwich Hamlet	2021–22	National League South	0	0	0	0	—		0	0	0	0
Eastbourne Borough	2022–23	National League South	28	1	1	0	—		3 (Note: One appearance in FA Trophy, two appearances and one goal in Sussex Senior Cup)	1	32	2
Dulwich Hamlet	2023–24	Isthmian League Premier Division	9	0	1	0	—		2 (Note: Appearance(s) in FA Trophy)	0	12	0
Chatham Town	2023–24	Isthmian League Premier Division	10	0	0	0	—		7 (Note: Three appearances in Alan Turvey Trophy, two appearances in Kent Senior Cup, two appearances in Isthmian League Premier Division play-offs)	0	17	0
Chatham Town	2024–25	Isthmian League Premier Division	18	0	1	0	—		4 (Note: Two appearances in FA Trophy, one appearance in Alan Turvey Trophy, one appearance in Kent Senior Cup)	0	23	0
Chatham Town	Total		28	0	1	0	0	0	11	0	40	0
Folkestone Invicta	2024–25	Isthmian League Premier Division	10	0	0	0	—		0	0	10	0
Career total			84	1	3	0	1	0	21	1	109	2

=== International ===
As of match played 8 June 2021

Appearances and goals by national team and year
National team	Year	Apps	Goals
Guyana	2021	4	0
Total		4	0
