= Martell Taylor-Crossdale =

English footballer

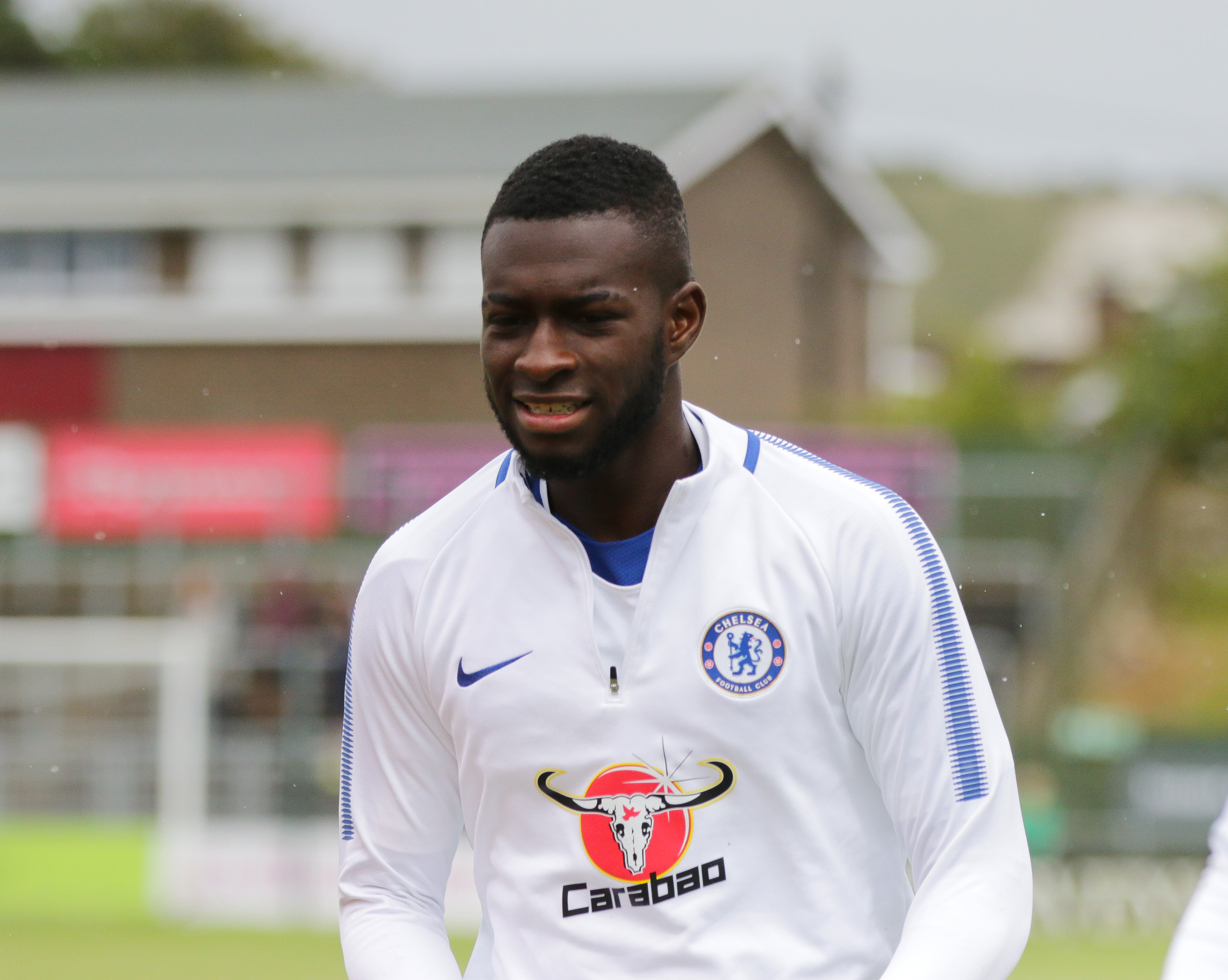
- Martell Taylor-Crossdale in 2017.

Personal information
- Full name: Martell De-Angelo Taylor-Crossdale
- Date of birth: 26 December 1999 (age 26)
- Place of birth: Edmonton, England
- Height: 6 ft 1 in (1.85 m)
- Position: Striker

Youth career
- 2007–2019: Chelsea
- 2019–2021: Fulham

Senior career*
Years	Team	Apps	(Gls)
2019–2021	Fulham	0	(0)
2020	→ Colchester United (loan)	1	(0)
2021–2022	Weymouth	8	(0)
2022	Gloucester City	1	(0)
2022	Hendon	2	(0)
2022–2023	Metropolitan Police	20	(8)
2023–2024	Haverfordwest County	29	(9)
2024–2025	Welling United	30	(1)
2025–	Tonbridge Angels	12	(0)
2025–	→ Lewes (loan)	4	(1)

International career^{‡}
2014–2015	England U16	3	(4)
2015–2016	England U17	2	(1)
2016	England U18	2	(1)
2017	England U20	2	(2)
- * Club domestic league appearances and goals as of 26 November 2025 ‡ National team caps and goals as of 11:00, 29 August 2019 (UTC)

Martell De-Angelo Taylor-Crossdale (born 26 December 1999) is an English professional footballer who plays for Isthmian League Premier Division side Lewes on-loan from Tonbridge Angels.

== Career ==
Taylor-Crossdale began his youth career with Chelsea but left the club following the expiration of his contract in the summer of 2019, signing a two-year deal with Fulham instead. He had turned down a move to Bundesliga side Hoffenheim to join Fulham, despite travelling to Germany to complete a medical with the side.

On 4 September 2020, Taylor-Crossdale joined League Two side Colchester United on a season-long loan deal. He made his debut for Colchester as a second-half substitute during their 2–0 EFL Trophy defeat to Portsmouth on 8 September. But on 18 October 2020, Taylor-Crossdale returned to his parent club Fulham after he left Colchester United via mutual consent.

In February 2021, Taylor-Crossdale joined EFL Championship side Queens Park Rangers on a trial period. He scored the only goal in a 1-0 U23 match against Ipswich Town on 23 February 2021.

After trials at Queens Park Rangers and Doncaster Rovers, Taylor-Crossdale joined National League side Weymouth in October 2021.

After a short spell at Gloucester City, he joined Hendon on 26 November 2022. Less than a month later, on 11 December, he moved to Metropolitan Police.

Taylor-Crossdale spent the 2023–24 season playing for Haverfordwest County in the Cymru Premier. He signed for Welling United in June 2024. Following a season with Welling United, he joined Tonbridge Angels. He then joined Lewes on a three-month loan in November 2025.

== Career statistics ==
As of 6 May 2024.

Appearances and goals by club, season and competition
Club	Season	League			FA Cup		League Cup		Other		Total	
Club	Season	Division	Apps	Goals	Apps	Goals	Apps	Goals	Apps	Goals	Apps	Goals
Chelsea U21	2016–17	–	–		–		–		2 (Note: Appearance(s) in EFL Trophy)	0	2	0
Chelsea U21	2017–18	–	–		–		–		3	0	3	0
Chelsea U21	2018–19	–	–		–		–		3	1	3	1
Chelsea U21	Total		–		–		–		8	1	8	1
Fulham	2019–20	Championship	0	0	0	0	1	0	0	0	1	0
Fulham	2020–21	Premier League	0	0	0	0	0	0	–		0	0
Fulham	Total		0	0	0	0	1	0	0	0	1	0
Fulham U21	2019–20	–	–		–		–		2	0	2	0
Colchester United (loan)	2020–21	League Two	0	0	0	0	0	0	1	0	1	0
Weymouth	2021–22	National League	8	0	–		–		–		8	0
Glouchester City	2022–23	National League North	1	0	–		–		–		1	0
Haverfordwest County	2023–24	Cymru Premier	26	9	3	2	–		4 (Note: Appearances in UEFA Europa Conference League)	1	33	12
Career total			35	9	3	2	1	0	15	2	54	13
