= Tom Stagg (footballer) =

English footballer (born 2002)

Personal information
- Full name: Thomas Jack Stagg
- Date of birth: 9 September 2002 (age 24)
- Place of birth: Harlow, England
- Position: Centre forward

Team information
- Current team: Witham Town

Youth career
- –2010: Kelvedon Hatch
- 2010–2019: Colchester United

Senior career*
Years	Team	Apps	(Gls)
2019–2022	Colchester United	1	(0)
2019	→ Maldon & Tiptree (loan)	0	(0)
2019–2020	→ Witham Town (loan)	1	(0)
2020	→ Maldon & Tiptree (loan)	2	(0)
2021–2022	→ East Thurrock United (loan)	5	(0)
2022	→ Billericay Town (loan)	3	(0)
2022	→ Hashtag United (loan)	3	(1)
2022	Billericay Town	1	(0)
2022	Cray Wanderers	1	(0)
2022	Wingate & Finchley	5	(0)
2023	Billericay Town	1	(0)
2023	Grays Athletic	4	(1)
2023	Weymouth	4	(1)
2023	Cheshunt	1	(0)
2023–2024	Leatherhead	13	(5)
2024	Bowers & Pitsea	14	(3)
2024	Carshalton Athletic	7	(2)
2024–2025	Concord Rangers	12	(7)
2025	Witham Town	8	(2)
2025	Bowers & Pitsea	2	(0)
2025	Bury Town	3	(0)
2025–	Witham Town	17	(5)
- * Club domestic league appearances and goals as of 19:30, 31 July 2026 (UTC)

Thomas Jack Stagg (born 9 September 2002) is an English semi-professional footballer who plays as a centre forward for Isthmian League North Division club Witham Town.

Stagg joined the Colchester United Academy at under-8 level from Kelvedon Hatch. His scholarship with Colchester United started in 2019, and he would make his professional debut in 2021. During his time with Colchester, he had loan spells at Maldon & Tiptree, Witham Town, East Thurrock United, Billericay Town and Hashtag United.

== Career ==
Born in Harlow, Stagg signed for the Colchester United Academy at under-8 level, joining from local side Kelvedon Hatch. He was sent out on loan to Maldon & Tiptree in both the 2019–20 and 2020–21 seasons, and at Witham Town splitting the two stints with the Jammers. He then went on a month loan to East Thurrock United, where he played five games. After this he was sent out on another month loan, this time to National League South side Billericay Town. Close to the end of the 2021–22 season, Stagg was sent out on loan to Hashtag United, where he featured three times in the league, scoring an 88th-minute equaliser after coming off the bench on his debut against Great Wakering Rovers.

Stagg made his professional debut for Colchester in League Two on 8 May 2021. He was named on the first team substitutes bench for the first time in his career. He was then brought on for Frank Nouble in the 84th-minute of Colchester's 0–0 draw with Tranmere Rovers in the final game of the 2020–21 season.

Stagg was released by Colchester United at the end of the 2021–22 season.

On 1 May 2022 he went on trial with Sunderland, and featured in their Premier League 2 Division 2 game against Southampton, where he was subbed off after 67 minutes, and nothing further came from it.

Following a short spell with Billericay Town, in October 2022, the signing of Stagg was confirmed by Isthmian League Premier Division club Cray Wanderers. He had made his debut for the club a few days prior on 27 September, in a Kent Senior Cup game against Sheppey United. He returned for a third spell at Billericay in February 2023, before joining Grays Athletic the following month.

In May 2023, he signed for National League South club Weymouth.

== Love Island ==
Stagg appeared as a contestant on the thirteenth series of the ITV2 reality dating television show Love Island.

== Career statistics ==
As of end of 2025–26 season

Appearances and goals by club, season and competition
Club	Season	League			National Cup (Note: Includes FA Cup)		League Cup		Other		Total	
Club	Season	Division	Apps	Goals	Apps	Goals	Apps	Goals	Apps	Goals	Apps	Goals
Colchester United	2019–20	League Two	0	0	0	0	0	0	0	0	0	0
Colchester United	2020–21	League Two	1	0	–		0	0	0	0	1	0
Colchester United	Total		1	0	0	0	0	0	0	0	1	0
Maldon & Tiptree (loan)	2019–20	Isthmian League North Division	0	0	0	0	–		1 (Note: Appearance in Alan Turvey Trophy)	1	1	1
Witham Town (loan)	2019–20	Isthmian League North Division	1	0	0	0	–		0	0	1	0
Maldon & Tiptree (loan)	2020–21	Isthmian League North Division	2	0	3	0	–		0	0	5	0
East Thurrock United (loan)	2021-22	Isthmian League Premier Division	5	0	0	0	–		0	0	5	0
Billericay Town (loan)	2021–22	National League South	3	0	0	0	–		0	0	3	0
Hashtag United (loan)	2021–22	Isthmian League North Division	3	1	0	0	–		0	0	3	1
Billericay Town (Note: Includes appearances over two separate spells in the season)	2022–23	Isthmian League Premier Division	2	0	0	0	—		0	0	2	0
Wingate & Finchley	2022–23	Isthmian League Premier Division	5	0	—		—		2 (Note: One appearance in Velocity Cup; one appearance in London County Cup)	0	7	0
Grays Athletic	2022–23	Isthmian League North Division	4	1	—		—		1 (Note: Appearance in Isthmian League North play-offs)	0	5	1
Weymouth	2023–24	National League South	4	1	0	0	—		0	0	4	1
Cheshunt	2023–24	Isthmian League Premier Division	1	0	0	0	—		1 (Note: Appearance(s) in FA Trophy)	0	2	0
Leatherhead	2023–24	Isthmian League South Central Division	13	5	—		—		0	0	13	5
Bowers & Pitsea	2023–24	Isthmian League North Division	14	3	—		—		1	0	15	3
Carshalton Athletic	2024–25	Isthmian League Premier Division	7	2	4	0	—		1	0	12	2
Concord Rangers	2024–25	Isthmian League North Division	12	7	—		—		0	0	12	7
Witham Town	2024–25	Isthmian League North Division	8	2	—		—		0	0	8	2
Bowers & Pitsea	2025–26	Isthmian League North Division	2	0	0	0	—		0	0	2	0
Bury Town	2025–26	Southern League Premier Division Central	3	0	3	0	—		0	0	6	0
Witham Town	2025–26	Isthmian League North Division	17	5	—		—		0	0	17	5
Career total			90	22	10	0	0	0	7	1	107	23
