= Danny Green (footballer, born 1990) =

English footballer

Personal information
- Date of birth: 4 August 1990 (age 36)
- Place of birth: Harlow, England
- Height: 6 ft 0 in (1.83 m)
- Position: Midfielder

Senior career*
Years	Team	Apps	(Gls)
2006–2009	Harlow Town		
2008	→ Cheshunt (dual registration)		
2009	Bishop's Stortford	4	(0)
2009	St Albans City	8	(1)
2009	Bishop's Stortford	2	(0)
2009–2010	Billericay Town	28	(4)
2010–2012	Dagenham & Redbridge	11	(1)
2010	→ Braintree Town (loan)	4	(0)
2010	→ Chelmsford City (loan)	0	(0)
2010–2011	→ Boreham Wood (loan)	8	(0)
2012	→ Dover Athletic (loan)	3	(0)
2012	AFC Sudbury	1	(0)
2012	Bishop's Stortford	0	(0)
2012–2013	Thurrock	2	(0)
2013–2015	Maidenhead United	33	(11)
2015–2016	Margate	36	(6)
2016–2021	Wealdstone	188	(34)
2021–2022	Concord Rangers	50	(19)
2022	Hornchurch	4	(2)
2022–2023	Hayes & Yeading United	21	(5)
- * Club domestic league appearances and goals as of 14:23, 13 June 2025 (UTC)

Daniel "Danny" Joe Green (born 4 August 1990) is an English former footballer.

== Career ==
Green started his career with Harlow Town. In January 2008, he joined Cheshunt as a dual registration player. He then joined Bishop's Stortford before moving to Billericay Town in October 2009. He joined Dagenham & Redbridge on a three-year contract in May 2010. He spent the first two months of the 2010–11 season on loan at Braintree Town, before spending a second loan spell at Chelmsford City and a third of the season at Boreham Wood.

He made his professional debut for Dagenham & Redbridge on 9 August, coming on as a substitute in their 5–0 away loss to Bournemouth in the Football League Cup Second Round.

In March 2012 he joined Dover Athletic on loan.

In October 2012 he was released from his contract with Dagenham & Redbridge. He played for AFC Sudbury in October 2012, making his club debut in a 3–0 Ryman League Cup exit at home to Leiston, just a day after it was announced he had left Dagenham & Redbridge by mutual consent.

Later in the month, he returned to Bishop's Stortford. After two months with Bishop's Stortford and making just one cup appearance, he left the club and joined Thurrock F.C. Green remained with Thurrock until the end of the season, before signing for Maidenhead United in the summer.

In June 2015, Green signed for National League South rivals Margate on a one-season deal, before moving to National League South rivals Wealdstone ahead of the 2016–17 season. Green scored his first Wealdstone goal against Oxford City on 16 August 2016, and quickly became an important player in the Stones' midfield. He was a key component of the Wealdstone side who won promotion to the National League in the 2019–20 season, featuring in all but one game before the season was curtailed due to the COVID-19 pandemic and Wealdstone were promoted on points per game. Green made 36 appearances in the 2020–21 season, scoring a solitary goal against King's Lynn. On 4 June 2021 it was announced that Green had departed the club, having scored a total of 40 goals in 230 appearances.

In June 2021 it was announced that Green had signed for Concord Rangers.

On 29 October 2022, Green signed for Isthmian League Premier Division side Hornchurch.

The following month Green signed for Hayes & Yeading United. He left the club at the end of the season.
