= Michael Folivi =

English footballer (born 1998)

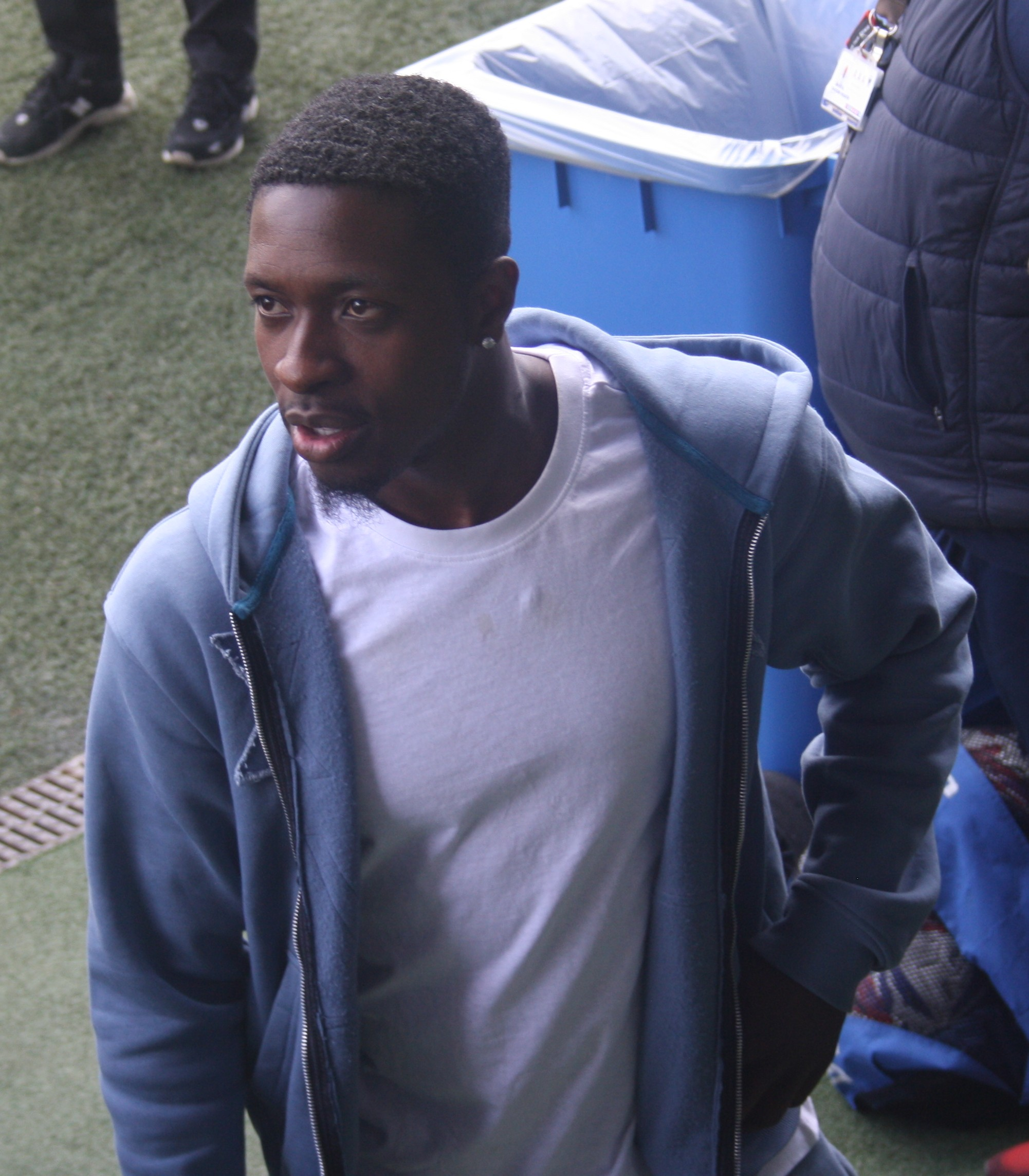
- Michael Folivi in 2025.

Personal information
- Full name: Michael Kwaku Foli Folivi
- Date of birth: 25 February 1998 (age 28)
- Place of birth: Wembley, England
- Height: 5 ft 11 in (1.80 m)
- Position: Forward

Team information
- Current team: Sholing
- Number: 19

Youth career
- 2008–2016: Watford

Senior career*
Years	Team	Apps	(Gls)
2016–2020	Watford	1	(0)
2017	→ Coventry City (loan)	1	(0)
2018	→ Boreham Wood (loan)	13	(1)
2019	→ AFC Wimbledon (loan)	10	(2)
2019–2020	→ AFC Wimbledon (loan)	10	(0)
2020–2021	Colchester United	27	(5)
2023	Chelmsford City	14	(6)
2023–2024	Farnborough	16	(5)
2024	Hemel Hempstead Town	16	(4)
2024	Enfield Town	6	(1)
2024	Chesham United	2	(0)
2024–	Sholing	67	(38)
- * Club domestic league appearances and goals as of 21:03, 3 September 2026 (UTC)

Michael Kwaku Foli Folivi (born 25 February 1998) is an English professional footballer who plays as a forward for Southern League Premier Division South club Sholing.

== Club career ==
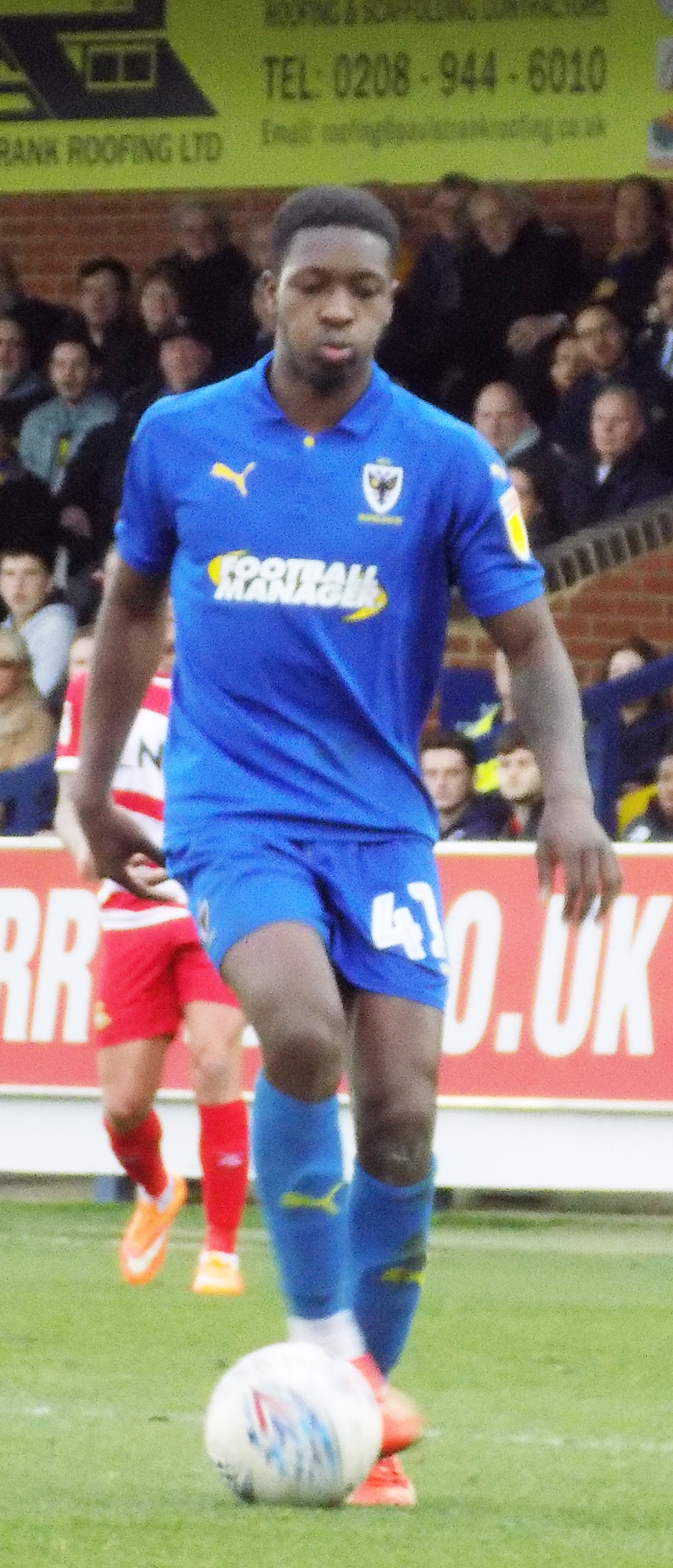
Folivi playing for AFC Wimbledon.

Folivi signed his first professional contract with Watford in 2015 whilst still in the club's youth system and completed his scholarship in summer 2016. Having been part of the first team squad that travelled to Liverpool in the Premier League in November 2016, Folivi extended his contract until 2020. He made his professional debut on 3 January 2017, coming on as an 81st-minute substitute for Sebastian Prodl in a 2–0 Premier League defeat away at Stoke City.

On 31 January 2017 Folivi joined League One side Coventry City on loan for the remainder of the season. Having been out injured with an ankle injury, Folivi made his only first team appearance coming on as a substitute for Marcus Tudgay in the final game of the season. He was an unused substitute as Coventry won the 2017 EFL Trophy Final at Wembley Stadium.

On 11 January 2018 Folivi joined National League side Boreham Wood on loan for the remainder of the season. The club reached the play-offs, and Folivi scored what proved to be the decisive goal in their 3–2 win over Sutton United in the semi-finals. He started the final against Tranmere Rovers at Wembley Stadium but was taken off after 70 minutes, prior to Tranmere scoring the winner in a 2–1 victory.

On 31 January 2019, Folivi joined League One side AFC Wimbledon on loan for the rest of the season, playing 11 times as the club retained their status in the division. He rejoined Wimbledon on a season-long loan in July 2019, but the loan was cut short on 3 January. He was released by Watford in June 2020.

On 2 November 2020, Folivi signed a contract with League Two club Colchester United until the end of the 2020–21 season. He made his debut on 3 November as a substitute for Jevani Brown in Colchester's 3–1 home win against Stevenage. He scored his first goal for the club on 10 November in Colchester's 6–1 EFL Trophy win against Southend United. With his contract with Colchester expiring in the summer, Folivi had been set to sign a new deal with the club. However, he sustained an Achilles tendon injury which resulted in him requiring surgery. As such, his new Colchester contract offer was put on hold.

On 20 February 2023, Folivi signed for Chelmsford City following his recovery from injury.

On 11 July 2023, Folivi joined Farnborough.

Following a six-month spell with Farnborough, Folivi joined fellow National League South side, Hemel Hempstead Town in January 2024.

He joined newly promoted side Enfield Town ahead of the 2024-25 season. He departed the club in September 2024 in search for regular football. On 29 November 2024, following a short spell with Chesham United, he joined Southern League Premier Division South club Sholing.

== Personal life ==
Born in England, Folivi is of Ghanaian descent.

== Career statistics ==
As of match played 31 August 2026

Appearances and goals by club, season and competition
Club	Season	League			FA Cup		League Cup		Other		Total	
Club	Season	League	Apps	Goals	Apps	Goals	Apps	Goals	Apps	Goals	Apps	Goals
Watford	2016–17	Premier League	1	0	0	0	0	0	—		1	0
Watford	2017–18	Premier League	0	0	0	0	0	0	—		0	0
Watford	2018–19	Premier League	0	0	0	0	0	0	—		0	0
Watford	2019–20	Premier League	0	0	0	0	0	0	—		0	0
Watford	Total		1	0	0	0	0	0	0	0	1	0
Coventry City (loan)	2016–17	League One	1	0	0	0	0	0	0	0	1	0
Boreham Wood (loan)	2017–18	National League	13	1	—		—		5 (Note: Two appearances in FA Trophy, three appearances and one goal in National League play-offs)	1	18	2
AFC Wimbledon (loan)	2018–19	League One	10	2	1	0	0	0	0	0	11	2
AFC Wimbledon (loan)	2019–20	League One	10	0	0	0	1	0	2 (Note: Two appearances in EFL Trophy)	1	13	1
AFC Wimbledon (loan)	Total		20	2	1	0	1	0	2	1	24	3
Colchester United	2020–21	League Two	27	5	1	0	—		1 (Note: One appearance in EFL Trophy)	1	29	6
Chelmsford City	2022–23	National League South	14	6	—		—		1 (Note: One appearance in National League South play-offs)	0	15	6
Farnborough	2023–24	National League South	16	5	2	0	—		1 (Note: One appearance in FA Trophy)	0	19	5
Hemel Hempstead Town	2023–24	National League South	16	4	—		—		—		16	4
Enfield Town	2024–25	National League South	6	1	—		—		0	0	6	1
Chesham United	2024–25	National League South	2	0	2	0	—		0	0	4	0
Sholing	2024–25	Southern League Premier Division South	23	21	—		—		—		23	21
Sholing	2025–26	Southern League Premier Division South	40	17	3	4	—		1 (Note: One appearance in FA Trophy)	0	44	21
Sholing	2026–27	Southern League Premier Division South	4	0	0	0	—		0	0	4	0
Sholing	Total		67	38	3	4	—		1	0	71	42
Career total			183	62	9	4	1	0	11	3	204	69

== Honours ==
Coventry City

- EFL Trophy: 2016–17
