= Miles Welch-Hayes =

English footballer

Personal information
- Full name: Miles Winfield Welch-Hayes
- Date of birth: 25 October 1996 (age 30)
- Place of birth: Oxford, England
- Height: 6 ft 0 in (1.83 m)
- Position: Defender

Team information
- Current team: Maidenhead United
- Number: 5

Youth career
- 2010–2015: Oxford United

Senior career*
Years	Team	Apps	(Gls)
2015–2017	Oxford United	1	(0)
2015	→ Daventry Town (loan)	11	(0)
2015	→ North Leigh (loan)	9	(1)
2015–2016	→ Banbury United (loan)	16	(0)
2016–2017	→ Bath City (loan)	22	(0)
2017–2018	Bath City	31	(3)
2017	→ Oxford City (loan)	3	(0)
2018–2020	Macclesfield Town	47	(1)
2020–2022	Colchester United	50	(1)
2022–2023	Harrogate Town	10	(0)
2023	→ Altrincham (loan)	11	(1)
2023–2025	Livingston	3	(0)
2024	→ Dunfermline Athletic (loan)	12	(1)
2024–2025	→ Maidenhead United (loan)	31	(1)
2025–	Maidenhead United	29	(1)
- * Club domestic league appearances and goals as of 21:23, 15 November 2026 (UTC)

Miles Winfield Welch-Hayes (born 25 October 1996) is an English professional footballer who plays as a defender for National League South club Maidenhead United.

== Career ==
Welch-Hayes signed a professional contract with Oxford United in May 2016, at the age of 19. He made his League One debut for the club on 17 August 2016, playing the full 90 minutes of a 2–0 away defeat to Fleetwood Town at Highbury Stadium. He was released without making further appearances in May 2017 and joined Bath City on a permanent contract a week or so later. In October 2017 he began a one-month loan at Oxford City and started in the team that beat Colchester United of League Two in a first-round FA Cup upset on 4 November 2017. He was named in the Conference South team of the year in the 2017–18 season just after missing out on the play-offs with Bath City.

In June 2018, he signed for Macclesfield Town, newly promoted to League Two. He scored his first goal for the club at Walsall on 14 December 2019. On 1 February 2020 it was announced that he was one of three players to have left financially troubled Macclesfield during the January 2020 transfer window, following a meeting with the English Football League.

On 21 February 2020, Welch-Hayes joined Colchester United on a contract until summer 2022. He made his debut in Colchester's 3–2 aggregate League Two play-off semi-final defeat to Exeter City on 22 June 2020. He scored his first goal for the club on 3 October 2020 during their 3–3 draw with Oldham Athletic. Welch-Hayes was released at the end of the 2021–22 season.

In June 2022 he signed for Harrogate Town, also of League Two. In January 2023, he joined National League club Altrincham on loan until the end of the season.

Welch-Hayes signed for Livingston in June 2023.

On 22 February 2024, Welch-Hayes joined Dunfermline Athletic on loan for the rest of the season.

On 30 August 2024, he returned to England to join Maidenhead United on a season-long loan. He scored once in 35 appearances in the 2024-25 season.

His contract at Livingston was terminated by mutual consent on 1 September 2025. The following day, he re-joined Maidenhead on a permanent basis.

== Career statistics ==
As of 14 November 2026

Appearances and goals by club, season and competition
Club	Season	League			FA Cup		League Cup		Other		Total	
Club	Season	Division	Apps	Goals	Apps	Goals	Apps	Goals	Apps	Goals	Apps	Goals
Oxford United	2016–17	League One	1	0	0	0	0	0	0	0	1	0
Daventry Town (loan)	2014–15	SFL – Div 1 Central	11	0	0	0	—		0	0	14	0
North Leigh (loan)	2015–16	SFL – Div 1 South & West	13	1	0	0	—		1 (Note: Appearances in the FA Trophy)	0	10	1
Banbury United (loan)	2015–16	SFL – Div 1 South & West	23	0	0	0	—		2 (Note: One appearance in the Birmingham Senior Cup and one in the Buckinghamshire Senior Charity Cup)	0	18	0
Bath City	2016–17	National League South	22	0	0	0	—		1	0	23	0
Bath City	2017–18	National League South	31	3	—		—		0	0	31	3
Bath City	Bath City total		53	3	0	0	0	0	1	0	54	3
Oxford City (loan)	2017–18	National League South	3	0	1	0	—		0	0	4	0
Macclesfield Town	2018–19	League Two	23	0	1	0	3	0	3 (Note: Appearance(s) in EFL Trophy)	0	30	0
Macclesfield Town	2019–20	League Two	24	1	0	0	2	0	2	0	28	1
Macclesfield Town	Total		47	1	1	0	5	0	5	0	58	1
Colchester United	2019–20	League Two	0	0	0	0	0	0	1 (Note: Appearance in EFL League Two play-offs)	0	1	0
Colchester United	2020–21	League Two	38	1	1	0	0	0	3	0	42	1
Colchester United	2021–22	League Two	12	0	0	0	1	0	2	0	15	0
Colchester United	Colchester total		50	1	1	0	1	0	6	0	58	1
Harrogate Town	2022–23	League Two	10	0	0	0	1	0	3	1	14	1
Altrincham (loan)	2022–23	National League	11	1	0	0	0	0	2	0	13	1
Livingston	2023–24	Scottish Premiership	3	0	0	0	0	0	0	0	3	0
Livingston B	2023–24	—			—		—		1 (Note: Appearance(s) in Scottish Challenge Cup)	0	1	0
Dunfermline Athletic (loan)	2023–24	Scottish Championship	12	1	0	0	0	0	0	0	12	1
Maidenhead United (loan)	2024–25	National League	31	1	3	0	0	0	1 (Note: Appearance(s) in National League Cup)	0	35	1
Maidenhead United	2025–26	National League South	25	1	1	0	0	0	3 (Note: One appearance in FA Trophy, two appearances in Berks & Bucks Senior Cup)	0	29	1
Maidenhead United	2026–27	National League South	4	0	0	0	0	0	1	1	5	1
Maidenhead United	Total		29	1	1	0	0	0	4	1	34	2
Career total			298	10	7	0	7	0	26	2	329	12
