= Sammie McLeod =

English footballer

Personal information
- Full name: Sammie Thomas McLeod
- Date of birth: 6 December 1999 (age 26)
- Place of birth: Royal Tunbridge Wells, England
- Height: 6 ft 2 in (1.88 m)
- Position: Midfielder

Team information
- Current team: Cray Wanderers

Youth career
- 2016–2017: Maidstone United
- 2017–2018: Leicester City

Senior career*
Years	Team	Apps	(Gls)
2018–2019	Maldon & Tiptree	23	(9)
2019–2021	Colchester United	1	(0)
2021	Concord Rangers	1	(0)
2021–2022	Portadown	20	(3)
2022	Lewes	4	(0)
2022	Þór Akureyri	10	(0)
2022–2023	Worthing	18	(1)
2022–2023	→ Bognor Regis Town (dual-registration)	3	(0)
2024	Tunbridge Wells	13	(0)
2024–2025	Sevenoaks Town	39	(0)
2025–2026	Dartford	14	(0)
2025–2026	→ Sevenoaks Town (loan)	5	(1)
2026–	Cray Wanderers	8	(1)
- * Club domestic league appearances and goals as of 17:10, 8 November 2026 (UTC)

Sammie Thomas McLeod (born 6 December 1999) is an English professional footballer who plays as a midfielder for Cray Wanderers.

McLeod joined Leicester City in 2017 from Maidstone United. After appearing in the U18 Premier League, he joined Maldon & Tiptree in 2018. In summer 2019, after impressing at Maldon & Tiptree, he joined Colchester United. He made his professional debut for Colchester in September 2020.

== Career ==
Born in Royal Tunbridge Wells, McLeod started his career with Maidstone United, where he featured twice on the first-team bench but failed to make an appearance. He joined Leicester City in January 2017 where he featured for their Academy under-18 side. He made 14 U18 Premier League and FA Youth Cup appearances for the under-18s.

For the 2018–19 season, McLeod signed for Isthmian League North Division side Maldon & Tiptree, where he scored eight goals in 28 appearances between August and February, before a leg injury ended his season in March.

On 8 June 2019, League Two club Colchester United announced the signing of McLeod on a two-year deal.

McLeod made his professional debut on 19 September 2020, coming off the bench to replace Luke Gambin in Colchester's 2–0 win against Bolton Wanderers. He made his first start for the club ten days later in their 1–0 defeat to West Ham United under-21s in the EFL Trophy.

Colchester announced that McLeod was one of seven under-23 players who had their contract terminated by mutual consent on 1 February 2021.

After his release, he featured for National League South side Concord Rangers.

In May 2021, McLeod joined NIFL Premiership side Portadown. McLeod scored the Irish Premiership Goal of the Month for November, for his volley against Dungannon Swifts. On 18 January 2022, McLeod left Portadown by mutual consent.

In February 2022, McLeod returned to England and played four matches for Isthmian League side Lewes.

In March 2022, McLeod signed for 1. deild karla side Þór Akureyri.

Having returned to England in 2022, McLeod joined National League South side Worthing before departing for Bognor Regis Town in December 2022 on a dual-registration basis.

In February 2024, McLeod joined hometown club Tunbridge Wells. Ahead of the 2024–25 season, he moved up a division to Sevenoaks Town.

On 27 June 2025, McLeod joined Dartford ahead of the 2025–26 season.
