= Will Greenidge =

English footballer (born 2002)

Personal information
- Full name: William Winston Greenidge
- Date of birth: 15 May 2002 (age 24)
- Place of birth: Redbridge, England
- Height: 1.75 m (5 ft 9 in)
- Position: Right back

Team information
- Current team: Hornchurch
- Number: 2

Youth career
- West Ham United

Senior career*
Years	Team	Apps	(Gls)
2023–2025	Colchester United	29	(0)
2024	→ Hornchurch (loan)	13	(0)
2025–	Hornchurch	0	(0)
- * Club domestic league appearances and goals as of 09:23, 24 January 2025 (UTC)

William Winston Greenidge (born 15 May 2002) is an English professional footballer who plays as a right back for National League club Hornchurch.

== Career ==
After playing for West Ham United, where he won the Dylan Tombides Award, Greenidge signed for Colchester United in January 2023 on a two-and-a-half-year contract.

On 6 September 2024, Greenidge joined Hornchurch on loan until January.

On 23 January 2025, Colchester United announced that Greenidge's contract had been cancelled by mutual consent, with Greenidge free to seek another club as a free agent. That same day, Hornchurch announced that they had signed Greenidge on a permanent basis.

== Career statistics ==
As of 26 December 2024

Appearances and goals by club, season and competition
Club	Season	League			FA Cup		League Cup		Other		Total	
Club	Season	Division	Apps	Goals	Apps	Goals	Apps	Goals	Apps	Goals	Apps	Goals
West Ham United U21	2019-20	—	—		—		—		1 (Note: Appearance(s) in the EFL Trophy)	0	1	0
West Ham United U21	2020–21	—	—		—		—		1	0	1	0
West Ham United U21	2021–22	—	—		—		—		1	0	1	0
West Ham United U21	2022–23	—	—		—		—		3	1	3	1
West Ham United U21	Total		—		—		—		6	1	6	1
Colchester United	2022–23	League Two	10	0	0	0	0	0	0	0	10	0
Colchester United	2023–24	League Two	19	0	1	0	1	0	4	0	25	0
Colchester United	2024–25	League Two	0	0	0	0	0	0	0	0	0	0
Colchester United	Total		29	0	1	0	1	0	4	0	35	0
Hornchurch (loan)	2024–25	National League South	13	0	0	0	—		0	0	13	0
Hornchurch	2024–25	National League South	0	0	0	0	—		0	0	0	0
Career total			42	0	1	0	1	0	10	1	54	1

== Honours ==
Hornchurch

- National League South play-offs: 2026
