= 2023–24 Colchester United F.C. season =

87th season in existence of Colchester United FC

Colchester United
2023–24 season
- Chairman: Robbie Cowling
- Head Coach: Ben Garner (until 21 October); Matthew Etherington (from 16 November to 1 January); Danny Cowley (from 4 January)
- Stadium: Colchester Community Stadium
- League Two: 22nd
- FA Cup: First round
- EFL Cup: First round
- EFL Trophy: Second round
Home colours

The 2023–24 season is the 87th season in the history of Colchester United and their eighth consecutive season in League Two. The club participated in League Two, the FA Cup, the EFL Cup, and the 2023–24 EFL Trophy.

== Current squad ==
As of 16 February 2024

No.	Name	Position	Nationality	Place of birth	Date of birth (age)	Previous club	Date signed	Fee	Contract end
Goalkeepers
1	Owen Goodman	GK	(England)	Harold Wood	27 November 2003 (age 22)	Crystal Palace	14 July 2023	Loan	31 May 2024
12	Tom Smith	GK	(England)		30 January 2002 (age 24)	Arsenal	31 July 2023	Free	30 June 2025
29	Sam Hornby	GK	(England)	Birmingham	14 February 1995 (age 31)	Bradford City	1 July 2022	Undisclosed	30 June 2024
44	Ted Collins	GK	(England)	Colchester	28 January 2003 (age 23)	Academy	1 July 2023	Trainee	30 June 2024
Defenders
2	Will Greenidge	CB	(England)	Redbridge	15 May 2002 (age 24)	West Ham United	27 January 2023	Undisclosed	30 June 2025
3	Ellis Iandolo	LB	(England)	Chatham	22 August 1997 (age 29)	Swindon Town	23 June 2023	Undisclosed	30 June 2025
4	Fiacre Kelleher	CB	(Republic of Ireland)	Cork	10 March 1996 (age 30)	Bradford City	4 January 2023	Undisclosed	30 June 2025
5	Connor Hall	CB	(England)	Slough	23 May 1993 (age 33)	Port Vale	7 January 2023	Undisclosed	30 June 2025
6	Tom Dallison	CB	(England)	Dagenham	2 February 1996 (age 30)	Crawley Town	6 January 2022	Undisclosed	30 June 2024
15	Zach Mitchell	CB	(England)	Bromley	9 January 2005 (age 21)	Charlton Athletic	1 September 2023	Loan	31 May 2024
18	Mandela Egbo	RB	(England)	Brent	17 August 1997 (age 29)	Charlton Athletic	15 August 2023	Undisclosed	30 June 2025
22	Riley Harbottle	CB	(England)	Nottingham	26 September 2000 (age 26)	(Scotland) Hibernian	23 January 2024	Loan	31 May 2024
26	Jayden Richardson	RB	(England)	Nottingham	4 September 2000 (age 26)	(Scotland) Aberdeen	12 January 2024	Loan	31 May 2024
36	Matt Yates	RB	(England)		7 March 2005 (age 21)	Academy	1 July 2023	Trainee	30 June 2024
43	Harry Beadle	CB	(England)	London	7 January 2003 (age 23)	Charlton Athletic	1 July 2021	Free	30 June 2024
Midfielders
10	Noah Chilvers	AM	(England)	Chelmsford	22 February 2001 (age 25)	Academy	1 July 2019	Trainee	30 June 2024
13	Cameron McGeehan	CM	(Northern Ireland)	(England) Kingston upon Thames	6 April 1995 (age 31)	(Belgium) KV Oostende	4 September 2023	Free	30 June 2024
16	Arthur Read	CM	(England)	Camden	3 November 1999 (age 27)	Stevenage	3 January 2023	Undisclosed	30 June 2025
17	Harry Anderson	RM	(England)	Chertsey	9 January 1997 (age 29)	Stevenage	26 January 2024	Loan	31 May 2024
20	Jay Mingi	DM	(England)	London	22 October 2000 (age 26)	Portsmouth	1 September 2023	Free	30 June 2025
21	Gene Kennedy	DM	(England)	Harlow	18 April 2003 (age 23)	Academy	1 July 2021	Trainee	30 June 2024
27	Alistair Smith	CM	(England)	Beverley	19 May 1999 (age 27)	Lincoln City	24 January 2024	Loan	31 May 2024
31	Donnell Thomas	AM	(England)		4 August 2003 (age 23)	Academy	1 July 2023	Trainee	30 June 2024
33	Marley Marshall-Miranda	DM	(England)	(Spain) Madrid	22 October 2002 (age 24)	Brighton & Hove Albion	1 January 2019	Free	30 June 2024
34	Kennedy Mupomba	AM	(England)		22 January 2005 (age 21)	Academy	1 July 2023	Trainee	30 June 2024
35	Archie Oliver	CM	(England)		27 September 2004 (age 22)	West Bromwich Albion	1 July 2023	Free	30 June 2025
42	Jayden Fevrier	LM	(England)	Waltham Forest	14 April 2003 (age 23)	West Ham United	5 October 2022	Free	30 June 2025
45	Taizo Marcel-Dilaver	AM	(England)		20 July 2005 (age 21)	Academy	1 July 2023	Trainee	30 June 2024
46	Bayan Aman	DM	(England)		1 July 2005 (age 21)	Academy	1 July 2023	Trainee	30 June 2024
Forwards
7	Matt Jay	SS	(England)	Torbay	27 February 1996 (age 30)	Exeter City	9 January 2023	Undisclosed	30 June 2025
8	Conor Wilkinson	CF	(Republic of Ireland)	(England) Croydon	23 January 1995 (age 31)	(Scotland) Motherwell	3 January 2024	Undisclosed	30 June 2025
9	Samson Tovide	CF	(England)	Hackney	4 January 1994 (age 32)	Academy	1 July 2022	Trainee	30 June 2026
11	Owura Edwards	RW	(England)	Bristol	10 April 2001 (age 25)	Bristol City	1 September 2023	Undisclosed	30 June 2025
14	Tom Hopper	CF	(England)	Boston	14 December 1993 (age 32)	Lincoln City	26 January 2023	Undisclosed	30 June 2025
24	John Akinde	CF	(England)	Gravesend	8 July 1989 (age 37)	Gillingham	27 January 2022	Free	30 June 2024
41	Kaleel Green	CF	(England)		24 November 2004 (age 21)	Arsenal	1 July 2023	Free	30 June 2025
47	Oscar Thorn	RW	(England)		22 March 2004 (age 22)	Norwich City	16 January 2023	Free	30 June 2024
48	Bradley Ihionvien	CF	(England)		23 December 2003 (age 22)	Academy	1 July 2023	Trainee	30 June 2025
49	Kaan Bennett	SS	(England)		31 August 2004 (age 22)	Academy	1 July 2023	Trainee	30 June 2025
Out on Loan
28	Ronny Nelson	CB	(England)		28 August 2003 (age 23)	Leicester City	1 July 2023	Free	30 June 2024
30	Al-Amin Kazeem	LB	(England)		6 April 2002 (age 24)	Academy	1 July 2022	Trainee	30 June 2024
37	Chay Cooper	AM	(England)	Harlow	17 November 2001 (age 24)	Tottenham Hotspur	3 September 2021	Free	30 June 2024
39	Ryan Lowe	DM	(England)		18 October 2003 (age 23)	Academy	1 July 2023	Undisclosed	30 June 2024
40	Frankie Terry	CB	(England)	Havering	30 January 2004 (age 22)	Academy	1 July 2023	Trainee	30 June 2024
—N/a	Yassine En-Neyah	CM	(Republic of Ireland)	(Morocco) Oued Zem	10 June 2000 (age 26)	Truro City	1 September 2023	Free	30 June 2024

== Transfers ==
=== In ===
Date	Pos	Player	Transferred from	Fee	Ref
23 June 2023	LB	(England) Ellis Iandolo	(England) Swindon Town	Undisclosed	
1 July 2023	CB	(England) Jet Dyer †	(England) Aylesbury United	Free Transfer	
1 July 2023	CF	(England) Kaleel Green †	(England) Arsenal	Free Transfer	
1 July 2023	CB	(England) Ronny Nelson †	(England) Leicester City	Free Transfer	
1 July 2023	RW	(England) Archie Oliver †	(England) West Bromwich Albion	Free Transfer	
31 July 2023	GK	(England) Tom Smith	(England) Arsenal	Free Transfer	
15 August 2023	RB	(England) Mandela Egbo	(England) Charlton Athletic	Undisclosed	
1 September 2023	RW	(England) Owura Edwards	(England) Bristol City	Undisclosed	
1 September 2023	CM	(Republic of Ireland) Yassine En-Neyah	(England) Truro City	Free Transfer	
1 September 2023	DM	(England) Jay Mingi	(England) Portsmouth	Free Transfer	
4 September 2023	CM	(Northern Ireland) Cameron McGeehan	(Belgium) KV Oostende	Free Transfer	
3 January 2024	CF	(Republic of Ireland) Conor Wilkinson	(Scotland) Motherwell	Undisclosed	
26 January 2024	AM	(England) Hakeem Sandah †	Free agent	—N/a	
5 April 2024	CF	(England) Ollie Godziemki †	(England) Welling United	Free	

† Signed for U21's

=== Out ===
Date	Pos	Player	Transferred to	Fee	Ref
30 June 2023	CM	(England) Ossama Ashley	(England) Salford City	Undisclosed	
30 June 2023	LB	(England) Lion Bello	(England) Kingstonian	Released	
30 June 2023	CB	(England) Luke Chambers	Retired		
30 June 2023	LB	(England) Ryan Clampin	(England) Eastleigh	Released	
30 June 2023	RB	(England) Billy Cracknell	(England) Bishop's Stortford	Released	
30 June 2023	CB	(England) Tom Eastman	(England) Dagenham & Redbridge	End of Contract	
30 June 2023	LM	(England) Luke Hannant	(England) Gateshead	Released	
30 June 2023	DM	(Wales) Emyr Huws	Retired		
30 June 2023	CM	(Republic of Ireland) Alan Judge	(England) Woking	Released	
30 June 2023	GK	(Republic of Ireland) Kieran O'Hara	(Scotland) Kilmarnock	Released	
30 June 2023	LM	(England) Harvey Sayer	(England) Lowestoft Town	Released	
30 June 2023	SS	(England) Freddie Sears	(England) Dagenham & Redbridge	Released	
30 June 2023	DM	(England) Cole Skuse	Retired		
30 June 2023	CB	(New Zealand) Tommy Smith	(England) Milton Keynes Dons	Released	
1 September 2023	CF	(England) Jake Hutchinson	(Scotland) Queen of the South	Undisclosed	
1 September 2023	RB	(England) Junior Tchamadeu	(England) Stoke City	Undisclosed	
30 January 2024	RW	(England) Alex Newby	(England) Altrincham	Mutual Consent	

=== Loaned in ===
Date	Pos	Player	Loaned from	Fee	Ref
1 July 2023	CB	(England) Nico Lawrence	(England) Southampton	25 January 2024 (Note: On 25 January, Lawrence returned to Southampton early from his initial season-long loan.)	
14 July 2023	GK	(England) Owen Goodman	(England) Crystal Palace	End of Season	
18 July 2023	CM	(Portugal) Mauro Bandeira	(England) Arsenal	3 January 2024 (Note: On 3 January, Bandeira's season-long loan from Arsenal was mutually terminated.)	
5 August 2023	CF	(Wales) Joe Taylor	(England) Luton Town	8 January 2024 (Note: On 8 January, Taylor was recalled to Luton Town early.)	
1 September 2023	CB	(England) Zach Mitchell	(England) Charlton Athletic	End of Season	
12 January 2024	RB	(England) Jayden Richardson	(Scotland) Aberdeen	End of Season	
23 January 2024	CB	(England) Riley Harbottle	(Scotland) Hibernian	End of Season	
24 January 2024	CM	(England) Alistair Smith	(England) Lincoln City	End of Season	
26 January 2024	RM	(England) Harry Anderson	(England) Stevenage	End of Season	

=== Loaned out ===
Date	Pos	Player	Loaned to	Until	Ref
28 July 2023	CB	(England) Harry Beadle	(England) Braintree Town	10 October 2023	
1 August 2023	CB	(England) Frankie Terry	(England) Chelmsford City	2 October 2023 (Note: On 2 October, Terry was recalled from his season-long loan at Chelmsford City.)	
1 September 2023	CB	(England) Frankie Edwards	(England) Maldon & Tiptree	End of Season	
1 September 2023	CM	(Republic of Ireland) Yassine En-Neyah	(England) Maldon & Tiptree	End of Season	
21 September 2023	RW	(England) Alex Newby	(England) Altrincham	31 January 2024 (Note: On 3 January, Newby's loan at Altrincham was extended until the end of January.)	
13 October 2023	DM	(England) Bayan Aman	(England) Felixstowe & Walton United	11 November 2023	
13 October 2023	CB	(England) Harry Beadle	(England) Bishop's Stortford	6 January 2024 (Note: On 13 December, Beadle's loan at Bishop's Stortford was extended by a further month.)	
22 October 2023	CM	(England) Milton Oni	(England) Maldon & Tiptree	18 November 2023	
15 November 2023	GK	(England) Sam Hornby	(England) Solihull Moors	14 December 2023 (Note: On 14 December, Hornby was recalled from his loan at Solihull.)	
24 November 2023	RW	(England) Oscar Thorn	(England) Bath City	3 February 2024 (Note: On 4 January, Thorn's loan at Bath was extended by a further month.)	
21 December 2023	CB	(England) Andrew Palmer-Brown	(England) Brightlingsea Regent	18 January 2024	
12 January 2024	DM	(England) Ryan Lowe	(England) Margate	10 February 2024	
8 February 2024	LB	(England) Al-Amin Kazeem	(Republic of Ireland) Galway United	End of Season	
9 February 2024	CB	(England) Ronny Nelson	(England) Torquay United	9 March 2024	
10 February 2024	CB	(England) Frankie Terry	(England) Aveley	9 March 2024	
16 February 2024	AM	(England) Chay Cooper	(England) Hartlepool United	End of Season	
23 February 2024	GK	(England) Jayden Peglar	(England) Sheppey United	23 March 2024	

== Pre-season and friendlies ==
On 9 June, Colchester United announced four pre-season friendlies, against Ebbsfleet United, Peterborough United, West Ham Under Under-21s and Leyton Orient. Six days later, a fifth friendly was confirmed, against Maldon & Tiptree.

Win Draw Loss Fixtures

8 July 2023 Friendly	Maldon & Tiptree	0–4	Colchester United	Maldon
15:00 BST		Report	19' (o.g.); Cooper 44'; Dallison 84'; Tovide 85'	Stadium: Park Drive

15 July 2023 Friendly	Ebbsfleet United	2–4	Colchester United	Northfleet
15:00 BST	O'Neill 10'; Cundle 34'	Report	Tovide 13', 30', 45'; Ihionvien 62'	Stadium: Stonebridge Road

18 July 2023 Friendly	Stevenage	1–1	Colchester United	St Neots
19:45 BST	Roberts 37'	Report	Fevrier 36'	Stadium: Rowley Park

22 July 2023 Friendly	Colchester United	1–1	Peterborough United	Colchester
15:00 BST	Chilvers 59' (pen.)	Report	Clarke-Harris 8'	Stadium: Colchester Community Stadium

28 July 2023 Friendly	Colchester United	0–1	West Ham United U21	Maldon
19:30 BST		Report	10'	Stadium: Park Drive

29 July 2023 Friendly	Colchester United	2–1	Leyton Orient	Colchester
15:00 BST	Happe 10' (o.g.); Hall 55'	Report	Pegrum 72' (pen.)	Stadium: Colchester Community Stadium

== Competitions ==
=== Overall record ===
Competition	First match	Last match	Starting round	Final position	Record							
Competition	First match	Last match	Starting round	Final position	Pld	W	D	L	GF	GA	GD	Win %
League Two	12 August 2023	27 April 2024	Matchday 1	22nd	46	11	12	23	59	80	−21	23.91
FA Cup	4 November 2023		First round	First round	1	0	0	1	2	3	−1	0.00
EFL Cup	9 August 2023		First round	First round	1	0	1	0	2	2	+0	0.00
EFL Trophy	19 September 2023	5 December 2023	Group stage	Second round	4	2	0	2	3	10	−7	50.00
Total					52	13	13	26	66	95	−29	25.00

Last updated: 27 April 2024
Source: Soccerway

=== League Two ===
==== League table ====
Pos	Team	Pld	W	D	L	GF	GA	GD	Pts	Promotion, qualification or relegation
19	Swindon Town	46	14	12	20	77	83	−6	54	
20	Salford City	46	13	12	21	66	82	−16	51	
21	Grimsby Town	46	11	16	19	57	74	−17	49	
22	Colchester United	46	11	12	23	59	80	−21	45	
23	Sutton United (R)	46	9	15	22	59	84	−25	42	Relegated to National League
24	Forest Green Rovers (R)	46	11	9	26	44	78	−34	42	Relegated to National League

Source: EFL Official Website
Rules for classification: 1) Points; 2) Goal difference; 3) Number of goals scored; 4) Head-to-head results; 5) Wins; 6) Away goals; 7) Penalty points (sec 9.5); 8) 12-point sending off offences
(R) Relegated

==== Results summary ====
Overall								Home						Away					
Pld	W	D	L	GF	GA	GD	Pts	W	D	L	GF	GA	GD	W	D	L	GF	GA	GD
46	11	12	23	59	80	−21	45	6	7	10	34	41	−7	5	5	13	25	39	−14

Last updated: 27 April 2024.
Source: Soccerway

==== Results by round ====
Round	2	3	4	5	6	7	8	9	10	11	12	13	14	15	16	1^{1}	17	18	19	20	21	22	23	24	25	26	27	28	30	31	32	34	35	29^{2}	36^{4}	37	39	40	41	42	43	44	33^{3}	45	38^{5}	46
Ground	A	H	H	A	A	H	H	A	H	A	H	A	H	A	A	H	H	A	H	A	H	A	H	A	A	H	A	H	A	H	A	H	A	A	A	H	A	H	A	H	H	A	H	A	H	H
Result	L	L	L	W	L	W	D	L	W	L	L	L	L	W	W	W	D	L	L	L	D	L	W	L	L	L	D	D	W	D	L	D	D	D	L	D	D	W	D	L	L	W	W	L	L	D
Position	21	24	24	22	22	20	18	20	18	21	21	22	23	21	20	18	16	18	20	21	22	22	22	22	22	22	22	22	21	21	22	21	21	21	22	22	22	22	23	23	23	22	22	22	22	22

Updated to match(es) played on 23 April 2024. Source: Soccerway
A = Away; H = Home; W = Win; D = Draw; L = Loss; P = Postponed
Notes:
- ^{1} Matchday 1 (vs Swindon Town) was postponed due to a waterlogged pitch.
- ^{2} Matchday 29 (vs Salford City) was postponed due to a frozen pitch.
- ^{3} Matchday 33 (vs Grimsby Town) was postponed due to a waterlogged pitch.
- ^{4} Matchday 36 (vs Stockport County) was postponed due to a waterlogged pitch.
- ^{5} Matchday 38 (vs Doncaster Rovers) was postponed due to a waterlogged pitch.

==== Matches ====
On 22 June, the EFL League Two fixtures were released.

Win Draw Loss Fixtures

12 August 2023 2	Bradford City	2–1	Colchester United	Bradford
15:00 BST	Walker (yellow card) 7'; Oduor 45'; Platt (yellow card) 45+5'; Pattison 58'	Report	Taylor 9' (yellow card) 57'; Dallison (yellow card) 40'	Stadium: Valley Parade; Attendance: 17,177; Referee: Marc Edwards

15 August 2023 3	Colchester United	0–2	AFC Wimbledon	Colchester
19:45 BST	Egbo (yellow card) 83'; Ihionvien (yellow card) 89'; Read (yellow card) 90+5'	Report	Tilley 54' (yellow card) 67' (goal) 85'; Ogundere (yellow card) 65'; Davison (yellow card) 75'	Stadium: Colchester Community Stadium; Attendance: 4,036; Referee: Ben Atkinson

19 August 2023 4	Colchester United	2–3	Milton Keynes Dons	Colchester
15:00 BST	Taylor 10', 13'; Ihionvien (yellow card) 42'; Fevrier (yellow card) 45+2'; Chilvers (yellow card) 67'; Tchamadeu (yellow card) 81'; Egbo (yellow card) 85'	Report	Eisa 8' (yellow card) 45+5'; Harvie (yellow card) 82'; Gilbey (yellow card) 84' (goal) 88'; Grant (yellow card) 90+6'; Dennis 90+10'	Stadium: Colchester Community Stadium; Attendance: 3,857; Referee: Carl Brook

26 August 2023 5	Gillingham	0–3	Colchester United	Gillingham
15:00 BST	Malone (yellow card) 35'; Williams (yellow card) 41'; Coleman (red card) 87'	Report	Taylor (yellow card) 18'; Egbo (yellow card) 33'; Tchamadeu (yellow card) 40'; Kelleher 64'; Tovide 77'; Ihionvien 82' (yellow card) 83'	Stadium: Priestfield Stadium; Attendance: 6,991; Referee: Thomas Kirk

2 September 2023 6	Walsall	1–0	Colchester United	Bescot
15:00 BST	Farquharson (yellow card) 43'; Hutchinson 65'; Evans (yellow card) 76'; Draper (yellow card) 79'; Stirk (yellow card) 87'	Report	Taylor (yellow card) 54'	Stadium: Bescot Stadium; Attendance: 5,058; Referee: Lee Swabey

9 September 2023 7	Colchester United	2–0	Tranmere Rovers	Colchester
15:00 BST	Taylor 11'; Hall (yellow card) 15'; Tovide (yellow card) 45+1'; Ihionvien 87'	Report	Hendry (yellow card) 28'; Davies (yellow card) 39'; Jennings (yellow card) 45'; Pike (yellow card) 47'	Stadium: Colchester Community Stadium; Attendance: 3,474; Referee: Declan Bourne

16 September 2023 8	Colchester United	1–1	Mansfield Town	Colchester
15:00 BST	Taylor 30' (yellow card) 75'; Egbo (yellow card) 80'; Fevrier (yellow card) 87'; Chilvers (yellow card) 89'	Report	Reed (yellow card) 64'; Cargill (yellow card) 73'; Keillor-Dunn 90'; Johnson (yellow card) 90+2'	Stadium: Colchester Community Stadium; Attendance: 3,740; Referee: Andy Davies

23 September 2023 9	Crewe Alexandra	2–1	Colchester United	Crewe
15:00 BST	Long 3', 8' (pen.); Demetriou (yellow card) 90+3'	Report	Tovide 53'	Stadium: Gresty Road; Attendance: 4,070; Referee: Charles Breakspear

30 September 2023 10	Colchester United	5–4	Notts County	Colchester
15:00 BST	Chilvers 10'; Egbo (yellow card) 21'; Fevrier 31'; Read 38', 73'; McGeehan 58' (yellow card) 72' (yellow-red card) 79'; Tovide (yellow card) 68'; Goodman (yellow card) 75'	Report	McGoldrick (yellow card) 14'; Austin 21'; Baldwin (yellow card) 37'; Langstaff 48', 90+2'; Cameron (yellow card) 54'; Jones 67'	Stadium: Colchester Community Stadium; Attendance: 4,389; Referee: David Rock

3 October 2023 11	Newport County	2–1	Colchester United	Newport
19:45 BST	Wildig (yellow card) 36'; McLoughlin (yellow card) 41'; Evans 43'; Bogle 63'	Report	Mingi (yellow card) 18'; Tovide 34'; Read (red card) 89'; Chilvers (yellow card) 90+2'	Stadium: Rodney Parade; Attendance: 3,220; Referee: Lewis Smith

7 October 2023 12	Colchester United	1–3	Morecambe	Colchester
15:00 BST	Mitchell (yellow card) 24'; McGeehan 73'; Chilvers (penalty missed) 90+2'; Ihionvien (yellow card) 90+5'	Report	Mayor (yellow card) 2'; Tutonda (yellow card) 8'; Love (yellow card) 16'; McKiernan 21', 53', 61'; Connolly (red card) 36'; Senior (yellow card) 90+3'	Stadium: Colchester Community Stadium; Attendance: 3,350; Referee: Sam Purkiss

14 October 2023 13	Forest Green Rovers	5–0	Colchester United	Nailsworth
15:00 BST	Morton 41'; McAllister (yellow card) 44' (goal) 65'; Taylor 77'; Stevens 79', 90+3'	Report	Mingi (yellow card) 10' (yellow-red card) 47'; McGeehan (yellow card) 45+4'	Stadium: The New Lawn; Attendance: 2,137; Referee: Ollie Yates

21 October 2023 14	Colchester United	1–2	Harrogate Town	Colchester
15:00 GMT	Cooper 62'; Greenidge (yellow card) 72'	Report	Daly 65'; Folarin 80'	Stadium: Colchester Community Stadium; Attendance: 3,132; Referee: Paul Howard

24 October 2023 15	Grimsby Town	2–3	Colchester United	Cleethorpes
19:45 GMT	Goodman 7' (o.g.); Andrews (yellow card) 39'; Wilson 52'	Report	Taylor 10'; Mitchell (yellow card) 22' (goal) 35'; Dallison (yellow card) 60'; Read 64'; Egbo (yellow card) 66'	Stadium: Blundell Park; Attendance: 5,010; Referee: Scott Oldham

28 October 2023 16	Accrington Stanley	0–1	Colchester United	Accrington
15:00 GMT	Leigh (yellow card) 54'	Report	Taylor 57'; Greenidge (yellow card) 59'; Read (yellow card) 71'; Hopper (yellow card) 75'	Stadium: Crown Ground; Attendance: 2,107; Referee: Adam Herczeg

7 November 2023 1	Colchester United	3–1	Swindon Town	Colchester
19:45 GMT	Kinsella 49' (o.g.); Tovide (yellow card) 49' (goal) 64'; Chilvers 90+3'	Report	Young 23'; Kemp (yellow card) 31'; Kinsella (yellow card) 45'	Stadium: Colchester Community Stadium; Attendance: 3,455; Referee: Tom Nield
Note: Fixture was postponed due to a waterlogged pitch.

11 November 2023 17	Colchester United	1–1	Sutton United	Colchester
15:00 GMT	Dallison (yellow card) 74'; Read (yellow card) 78' (goal) 80'; McGeehan (yellow card) 90+4'	Report	Kizzi (yellow card) 20'; Smith (yellow card) 43'; Beautyman (yellow card) 44'; John (yellow card) 72'; Sowunmi 90+5'	Stadium: Colchester Community Stadium; Attendance: 3,732; Referee: Peter Wright

18 November 2023 18	Stockport County	2–0	Colchester United	Stockport
15:00 GMT	Bailey (yellow card) 35'; Wootton 44'; Camps 46'; Pye (yellow card) 60'; Touray (yellow card) 85'	Report	Tovide (yellow card) 67'	Stadium: Edgeley Park; Attendance: 9,664; Referee: Andy Davies

25 November 2023 19	Colchester United	1–4	Barrow	Colchester
15:00 GMT	McGeehan 20' (yellow card) 37'; Tovide (yellow card) 45+5'; Fevrier (yellow card) 51' (yellow-red card) 84'	Report	Stephenson (yellow card) 7'; Telford (yellow card) 43'; Proctor (yellow card) 45+5'; Greenidge 52' (o.g.); Ray 86', 90+3'; Mitchell 90+4' (o.g.)	Stadium: Colchester Community Stadium; Attendance: 3,263; Referee: Declan Bourne

28 November 2023 20	Doncaster Rovers	3–1	Colchester United	Doncaster
19:45 GMT	Maxwell 33'; Olowu (yellow card) 63'; Rowe (yellow card) 67'; Faal 73'; Ironside 87' (pen.)	Report	Hopper (yellow card) 22'; Taylor 43'; McGeehan (yellow card) 51'; Smith (yellow card) 60'; Ihionvien (yellow card) 79'	Stadium: The Eco-Power Stadium; Attendance: 5,412; Referee: Ben Toner

9 December 2023 21	Colchester United	1–2	Crawley Town	Colchester
15:00 GMT	McGeehan (yellow card) 19'; Fevrier (yellow card) 44'; Cooper (yellow card) 89'; Taylor 90+7'	Report	Kelly 41' (yellow card) 45+1'; Orsi 64' (pen.); Maguire (yellow card) 68'	Stadium: Colchester Community Stadium; Attendance: 3,132; Referee: James Durkin

16 December 2023 22	Wrexham	2–1	Colchester United	Wrexham
15:00 GMT	Lee 4'; Evans (yellow card) 20' (yellow-red card) 26'; McClean (yellow card) 37'; Tozer (yellow card) 56'; Mitchell 69' (o.g.); Davies (yellow card) 90+4'	Report	Taylor (yellow card) 43'; Kelleher (yellow card) 74'; Fevrier 89'	Stadium: Racecourse Ground; Attendance: 9,746; Referee: Ollie Yates

22 December 2023 23	Colchester United	2–1	Salford City	Colchester
19:45 GMT	Read (yellow card) 17'; Hall (yellow card) 29'; Taylor (yellow card) 31', (goal) 42'; Mitchell (yellow card) 74'; Cooper 89'; Akinde (yellow card) 90+3'	Report	Ingram (yellow card) 38'; McAleny 90+1'	Stadium: Colchester Community Stadium; Attendance: 3,560; Referee: Will Finnie

26 December 2023 24	Milton Keynes Dons	1–0	Colchester United	Denbigh
15:00 GMT	Williams (yellow card) 47'; Payne (yellow card) 55'; Dean (yellow card) 83'; Harrison 89'	Report	Read (yellow card) 66'	Stadium: Stadium MK; Attendance: 6,335; Referee: Alex Chilowicz

29 December 2023 25	AFC Wimbledon	5–3	Colchester United	Wimbledon
19:45 GMT	Davison 4', 52', (yellow card) 71'; Lewis 42', 90+2'; Al-Hamadi 67'; Biler (yellow card) 80'; Bugiel (yellow card) 81'	Report	McGeehan 7', (yellow card) 71' (yellow-red card) 89'; Taylor 25'; Chilvers (yellow card) 39'; Dallison 90+4'	Stadium: Plough Lane; Attendance: 8,062; Referee: Ben Atkinson

1 January 2024 26	Colchester United	0–1	Gillingham	Colchester
15:00 GMT	Iandolo (yellow card) 32'	Report	Malone 54', (yellow card) 90+4'; Bonne (yellow card) 80'; Lapslie (yellow card) 90'	Stadium: Colchester Community Stadium; Attendance: 4,923; Referee: Sam Purkiss

6 January 2024 27	Swindon Town	2–2	Colchester United	Swindon
15:00 GMT	Austin 18' (pen.); Brewitt 43'; Shade (yellow card) 74'	Report	Chilvers (yellow card) 14'; Jay 45+2'; Marshall-Miranda (yellow card) 64'; Ihionvien 90+4'	Stadium: The County Ground; Attendance: 7,564; Referee: Richie Watkins

13 January 2024 28	Colchester United	1–1	Bradford City	Colchester
15:00 GMT	Hopper 59'	Report	Cook 35'	Stadium: Colchester Community Stadium; Attendance: 4,625; Referee: Scott Simpson

27 January 2024 30	Morecambe	0–1	Colchester United	Morecambe
15:00 GMT	Harrack (yellow card) 24'; Garner (penalty missed) 47'; Rawson (yellow card) 74'; Bedeau (yellow card) 90+7'	Report	Read 27'; Wilkinson (yellow card) 74'; Dallison (yellow card) 80'	Stadium: Mazuma Stadium; Attendance: 3,383; Referee: Daniel Middleton

3 February 2024 31	Colchester United	3–3	Forest Green Rovers	Colchester
15:00 GMT	Hopper (yellow card) 9'; Smith 65'; Fevrier 67'; Anderson 70'	Report	Stevens 11' (pen.); Doidge 27'; Thompson 74'; Jones (yellow card) 83'	Stadium: Colchester Community Stadium; Attendance: 4,519; Referee: Neil Hair

10 February 2024 32	Harrogate Town	1–0	Colchester United	Harrogate
15:00 GMT	O'Connor (yellow card) 90+1'; Muldoon 90+2'	Report	Harbottle (yellow card) 28'; McGeehan (yellow card) 39'; Goodman (yellow card) 57'	Stadium: Wetherby Road; Attendance: 2,706; Referee: Tom Nield

17 February 2024 34	Colchester United	1–1	Accrington Stanley	Colchester
15:00 GMT	Iandolo (yellow card) 27'; Chilvers 40'; Harbottle (yellow card) 77'; Edwards (yellow card) 90+4'	Report	Mellor (yellow card) 21'; Hills (red card) 46'; Harbottle 80' (o.g.)	Stadium: Colchester Community Stadium; Attendance: 3,436; Referee: Jeremy Simpson

24 February 2024 35	Sutton United	1–1	Colchester United	Sutton
15:00 GMT	Lakin 18'; Eastmond (yellow card) 32'; Smith (penalty missed) 80'; Goodliffe (yellow card) 88'	Report	McGeehan 7'; Richardson (yellow card) 36'; Read (yellow card) 75'; Iandolo (yellow card) 90+6'	Stadium: Gander Green Lane; Attendance: 3,472; Referee: Ben Speedie

27 February 2024 29	Salford City	1–1	Colchester United	Kersal
19:45 GMT	Smith 45'; Morton (yellow card) 74'; Mariappa (yellow card) 83'; Humbles (yellow card) 88'; Ingram (yellow card) 90+3'	Report	Iandolo (yellow card) 45+3'; Ihionvien 75'; Hall (yellow card) 90+4'	Stadium: Peninsula Stadium; Attendance: 2,438; Referee: Kirsty Dowle
Note: Fixture was originally scheduled for 19 January, but was postponed due to freezing temperatures making the pitch unplayable.

9 March 2024 37	Barrow	2–0	Colchester United	Barrow-in-Furness
15:00 GMT	Spence 45+4'; Stephenson (yellow card) 83'; Foley 90+5'	Report	Richardson (yellow card) 13'; Ihionvien (yellow card) 81'; Hall (yellow card) 83'	Stadium: SO Legal Stadium; Attendance: 3,631; Referee: Scott Jackson

16 March 2024 39	Colchester United	1–1	Walsall	Colchester
15:00 GMT	McGeehan 48', (yellow card) 86'; Chilvers (penalty missed) 53'	Report	Allen 37'; Adegboyega (yellow card) 90+1'; Comley (yellow card) 90+4'	Stadium: Colchester Community Stadium; Attendance: 3,704; Referee: David Rock

23 March 2024 40	Mansfield Town	1–1	Colchester United	Mansfield
12:30 GMT	Keillor-Dunn (yellow card) 49'; Brunt 63'	Report	Anderson 12'; Ihionvien (yellow card) 16'; Hall (yellow card) 45+2'; Tovide (yellow card) 74'; Hopper (yellow card) 75'	Stadium: Field Mill; Attendance: 7,517; Referee: Simon Mather
Note: Fixture was initially scheduled for a 15:00 kick-off, but was moved for live Sky Sports broadcasting.

29 March 2024 41	Colchester United	2–1	Newport County	Colchester
15:00 GMT	McGeehan (yellow card) 67'; Iandolo 75'; Tovide (yellow card) 84'; Mingi 90+2'	Report	Zanzala 42'; Payne (yellow card) 68'; Waite (yellow card) 81'	Stadium: Colchester Community Stadium; Attendance: 4,308; Referee: Sunny Singh Gill

1 April 2024 42	Tranmere Rovers	1–1	Colchester United	Birkenhead
15:00 GMT	Morris 7'; Jennings (yellow card) 45+4'; Hendry (yellow card) 90+9'	Report	Smith 8'; Fevrier (yellow card) 35'; Hall (yellow card) 38'; McGeehan (yellow card) 40'; Mingi (yellow card) 77'	Stadium: Prenton Park; Attendance: 5,923; Referee: Scott Tallis

6 April 2024 43	Colchester United	1–2	Wrexham	Colchester
15:00 BST	Akinde 54'	Report	Evans (yellow card) 29'; Mullin 62'; Cleworth 85'	Stadium: Colchester Community Stadium; Attendance: 8,432; Referee: Tom Reeves

9 April 2024 36	Colchester United	1–2	Stockport County	Colchester
19:45 BST	Kelleher (yellow card) 10'; McGeehan 44', (penalty missed) 67', (yellow card) 71'; Mingi (yellow card) 50'	Report	Horsfall (yellow card) 17'; Powell 31', (yellow card) 82'; Madden 61'; Knoyle (yellow card) 73'	Stadium: Colchester Community Stadium; Attendance: 4,118; Referee: Ben Atkinson
Note: Fixture was originally scheduled for 2 March, but was postponed due to a waterlogged pitch.

13 April 2024 44	Crawley Town	2–3	Colchester United	Crawley
15:00 BST	Lolos 42'; Forster 90+7'	Report	Hopper 21', 46'; Iandolo (yellow card) 35'; McGeehan 44'; Dallison (yellow card) 69'; Tovide (red card) 88'; Hornby (yellow card) 90+5'	Stadium: Broadfield Stadium; Attendance: 5,223; Referee: Scott Oldham

16 April 2024 33	Colchester United	2–0	Grimsby Town	Colchester
19:45 BST	Hopper 5'; Hornby (yellow card) 73'; Iandolo (yellow card) 75'; Akinde 79'; Dallison (red card) 90+6'	Report	Obikwu (yellow card) 48'; Mullarkey (yellow card) 90+2'	Stadium: Colchester Community Stadium; Attendance: 4,350; Referee: Carl Brook
Note: Fixture was originally scheduled for 13 February, but was postponed due to a waterlogged pitch.

20 April 2024 45	Notts County	1–0	Colchester United	Nottingham
15:00 BST	Langstaff 54'; Jones (yellow card) 89'	Report	Mingi (yellow card) 53'; Chilvers (yellow card) 90+2'; Read (yellow card) 90+4'	Stadium: Meadow Lane; Attendance: 11,037; Referee: Darren Drysdale

23 April 2024 38	Colchester United	1–4	Doncaster Rovers	Colchester
19:45 BST	Fevrier 9'; Iandolo (yellow card) 13'; Harbottle (yellow card) 75'	Report	Molyneux 14'; Sterry (yellow card) 17'; Biggins 22', (yellow card) 73'; Ironside (yellow card) 45+3', (goal) 85'; Anderson 76'	Stadium: Colchester Community Stadium; Attendance: 4,041; Referee: Paul Howard
Note: Fixture was originally scheduled for 12 March, but was postponed due to a waterlogged pitch.

27 April 2024 46	Colchester United	1–1	Crewe Alexandra	Colchester
15:00 BST	Chilvers 35'; Kelleher (yellow card) 62'	Report	Rowe (yellow card) 49'; Nevitt 90+2'	Stadium: Colchester Community Stadium; Attendance: 6,491; Referee: Lewis Smith

=== FA Cup ===
The U's were drawn away to Shrewsbury Town in the first round.

Win Draw Loss Fixtures

4 November 2023 First Round	Shrewsbury Town	3–2	Colchester United	Shrewsbury
15:00 GMT	Shipley (yellow card) 11' (goal) 56'; Udoh 22'; Bayliss (yellow card) 24'; Winchester (yellow card) 71'; Hall 79' (o.g.); Thorpe (yellow card) 90+4'	Report	McGeehan 10'; Greenidge (yellow card) 28'; Dallison (yellow card) 63'; Mitchell 86'; Read (yellow card) 90+1'	Stadium: New Meadow; Referee: Scott Jackson

=== EFL Cup ===
Colchester were drawn away against Cardiff City in the first round.

Win Draw Loss Fixtures

9 August 2023 First round	Cardiff City	2–2 (3–0 p)	Colchester United	Leckwith
19:45 BST	Colwill 19' (yellow card) 78'; Etete 35'	Report	Akinde 40'; Taylor 44'; Tovide (red card) 89'; Greenidge (yellow card) 90+7'	Stadium: Cardiff City Stadium; Attendance: 5,158; Referee: Will Finnie
	Penalties
	Colwill (penalty missed); Romeo (penalty scored); Ojo (penalty scored); Ugbo (penalty scored)		Fevrier (penalty missed); Tchamadeu (penalty missed); Hopper (penalty missed)

=== EFL Trophy ===
In the group stage, Colchester United were drawn into Southern Group D along with Cambridge United, Peterborough United and Tottenham Hotspur U21. After finishing second in their group, they were drawn away to West Ham United U21 in the second round.

Pos	Div	Team	Pld	W	PW	PL	L	GF	GA	GD	Pts	Qualification
1	L1	Peterborough United	3	2	0	0	1	5	2	+3	6	Advance to Round 2
2	L2	Colchester United	3	2	0	0	1	3	6	−3	6	Advance to Round 2
3	ACA	Tottenham Hotspur U21	3	1	0	0	2	7	7	0	3	
4	L1	Cambridge United	3	1	0	0	2	5	5	0	3	

Updated to match(es) played on 7 November 2023. Source: EFL.com

Win Draw Loss Fixtures

19 September 2023 Group stage	Colchester United	0–5	Tottenham Hotspur U21	Colchester
19:30 BST	Hopper (yellow card) 21'; Tovide (yellow card) 71'; Ihionvien (yellow card) 87'		Santiago (yellow card) 15'; Donley 33', 56' (yellow card) 82'; Soonsup-Bell 53', 73'; Lankshear 60'; Lyons-Foster (yellow card) 73'	Stadium: Colchester Community Stadium

17 October 2023 Group stage	Cambridge United	1–2	Colchester United	Cambridge
19:00 BST	May (yellow card) 72'; Ahadme 90+5' (pen.)	Report	Tovide 17' (yellow card) 45+1'; Cooper 43'; Mingi (yellow card) 69'	Stadium: Abbey Stadium; Attendance: 991; Referee: Jamie O'Connor

21 November 2023 Group stage	Colchester United	1–0	Peterborough United	Colchester
19:30 GMT	Ihionvien 42'; Kennedy (yellow card) 75'	Report	Crichlow (yellow card) 64'; Van Lier (yellow card) 78'	Stadium: Colchester Community Stadium; Attendance: 802; Referee: Craig Hicks

5 December 2023 Second round	West Ham United U21	4–0	Colchester United	Colchester
19:30 GMT	Chesters 8'; Marshall (yellow card) 30'; Earthy 57'; Orford 78'; Mubama 82'	Report	Kennedy (yellow card) 74'; Akinde (yellow card) 90+1'	Stadium: Colchester Community Stadium; Attendance: 1,149; Referee: Jacob Miles
