= Samson Tovide =

English footballer

Personal information
- Full name: Samson Jolaoluwa Gbolahan Tovide
- Date of birth: 4 January 2004 (age 22)
- Place of birth: Hackney, England
- Position: Centre-forward

Team information
- Current team: Huddersfield Town
- Number: 34

Youth career
- Leyton Orient
- Colchester United

Senior career*
Years	Team	Apps	(Gls)
2020–2026	Colchester United	126	(17)
2026–	Huddersfield Town	0	(0)
- * Club domestic league appearances and goals as of 3 September 2026 (UTC)

Samson Jolaoluwa Gbolohan Tovide (born 4 January 2004) is an English footballer who plays as a centre-forward who plays for EFL League One club Huddersfield Town.

== Career ==
Tovide began his career in the academy at Leyton Orient, before moving on to Colchester United.

Tovide travelled with Colchester's first-team squad for their season-opening fixture at Bradford City on 12 September 2020. He made the bench but did not make an appearance. He made his first-team debut as a substitute for Jevani Brown during Colchester's 6–1 Essex derby win against Southend United in the EFL Trophy on 10 November 2020. He made his league debut on 8 October 2021, coming on as a late substitute for Frank Nouble in Colchester's 2–0 defeat by Tranmere Rovers. He was sent off on his first league start for the club when he handled the ball in the penalty area during Colchester's 3–1 home defeat by Sutton United on 26 October 2021. After that unfortunate start Tovide found first team opportunities hard to come by - appearing just four more times that season, each time coming off the bench late on in matches with just a few minutes left.

The 2022–23 season started in a similar vein with his first team opportunities limited to appearances off the bench and then by injury. It wasn't until after Colchester, then struggling against relegation near the bottom of EFL League Two, appointed Matt Bloomfield as Head Coach in September 2022 that Tovide got his next start, appearing in a 1–0 defeat at Crewe Alexandra, putting in a performance Bloomfield described as "Absolutely brilliant". Tovide was picked to start the next game and scored his first league goal – a long-range, left footed shot from outside the area – in a 3–0 win over Doncaster Rovers to help move Colchester out of the EFL League Two relegation zone. This goal was nominated for the EFL League Two 'Goal of the Month' for November.

Tovide signed a new two-year contract at the beginning of the 2023–24 season, with Colchester holding the option to extend his contract by a further year. He became a free agent following the expiry of his contract at the end of the 2025–26 season.

On 3 September 2026 he joined Huddersfield Town on a three-year contract.

== Career statistics ==
As of match played 19 August 2025

Appearances and goals by club, season and competition
Club	Season	League			FA Cup		League Cup		Other		Total	
Club	Season	Division	Apps	Goals	Apps	Goals	Apps	Goals	Apps	Goals	Apps	Goals
Colchester United	2020–21	League Two	0	0	0	0	0	0	1 (Note: Appearance(s) in EFL Trophy)	0	1	0
Colchester United	2021–22	League Two	6	0	1	0	0	0	3	0	10	0
Colchester United	2022–23	League Two	28	2	1	0	1	0	1	0	31	2
Colchester United	2023–24	League Two	21	4	1	0	1	0	3	1	27	5
Colchester United	2024–25	League Two	29	7	0	0	2	0	2	0	33	7
Colchester United	2025-26	League Two	38	4	0	0	1	0	0	0	39	4
Total			122	17	3	0	5	0	10	1	140	18
