= Connor Hall (footballer, born 1993) =

English footballer

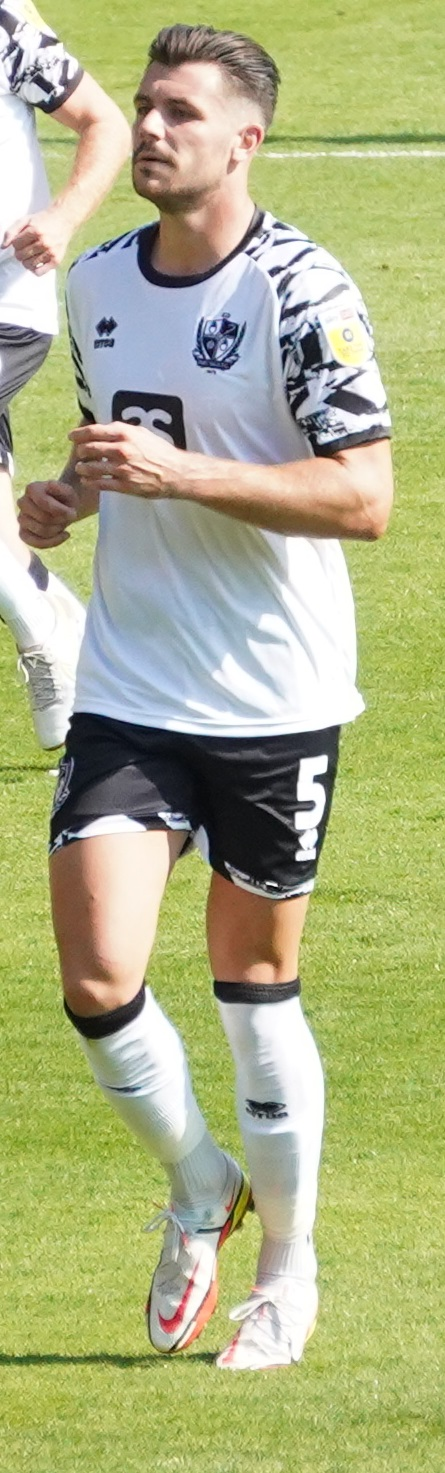
- Hall playing for Port Vale (August 2022)

Personal information
- Full name: Connor Hall
- Date of birth: 23 May 1993 (age 33)
- Place of birth: St Neots, England
- Height: 6 ft 4 in (1.93 m)
- Position: Defender

Team information
- Current team: Port Vale
- Number: 5

Senior career*
Years	Team	Apps	(Gls)
2011–2015	Bury Town	74	(5)
2015	St Neots Town	14	(2)
2015–2016	Bury Town	20	(1)
2016–2018	Biggleswade Town		
2018–2019	Brackley Town	38	(3)
2019–2022	Harrogate Town	94	(4)
2022–2023	Port Vale	44	(3)
2023–2024	Colchester United	61	(2)
2024–	Port Vale	96	(2)
- * Club domestic league appearances and goals as of 10:21, 22 November 2026 (UTC)

Connor Hall (born 23 May 1993) is an English professional footballer who plays as a defender for EFL League Two club Port Vale. He is also a vice-captain.

Hall began his career with Isthmian League side Bury Town, playing for the club from 2011 to 2016, apart from a short spell spent with St Neots Town in 2015. He then spent two seasons in the Southern League with Biggleswade Town before joining National League North club Brackley Town in 2018. He continued his move up the non-League pyramid by signing with Harrogate Town in May 2019. He helped Harrogate to secure a place in the English Football League with victory in the 2020 National League play-off final. This was followed by victory in the delayed 2020 FA Trophy final. He was sold to Port Vale in January 2022 and helped the club to win promotion out of League Two via the play-offs in four months later. He was sold to Colchester United in January 2023 for an undisclosed fee and rejoined Port Vale for another undisclosed fee in July 2024. He was named on the EFL League Two Team of the Season as the Vale won promotion in the 2024–25 campaign.

== Career ==
=== Early career ===
Originally from St Neots, Hall attended West Suffolk College. He started his senior career at Bury Town in the 2011–12 season after being encouraged to join the club by Willingham-based coach Dean Greygoose. He had a trial at Leyton Orient in 2012 and at the age of 21, he was set to sign for Cambridge United after being scouted towards the end of the 2012–13 season, but the deal was cancelled as a result of a groin injury that kept him sidelined for 18 months. He underwent four operations to correct the problems, which were bone spurs on both hips and torn cartilage on the right hip. He missed the entire 2013–14 season, with the club in decline due to financial problems and soon to lose long-standing manager Richard Wilkins, but Hall decided to stay on upon his recovery. He would make 43 appearances in the 2014–15 season, scoring five goals, as the "Blues" finished bottom of the Isthmian League Premier Division.

Hall joined Southern League Premier Division side St Neots Town in the summer of 2015. He returned to Bury Town on 24 November 2015. He later said that he went to St Neots because they were close to his home but he did not enjoy playing for the "Saints". He featured 22 times for both St Neots and Bury Town during the 2015–16 season, before leaving Bury Town after receiving a higher paid offer from a club closer to his home. Bury Town manager Ben Chenery noted Hall's hard work and later said that "he played centre-half, central midfield and left-back for us and was seamless in every one of those positions".

In the summer of 2016, Hall signed for Southern Football League Premier Division side Biggleswade Town. He played in a more advanced position for the club and scored 18 goals throughout two seasons.

He signed for National League North side Brackley Town in June 2018. He partnered with Gareth Dean in central defence. Brackley finished the 2018–19 season in third-place, with only champions Stockport County conceding fewer goals. Kevin Wilkin's "Saints" qualified for the play-off semi-finals, but were defeated by Spennymoor Town in a penalty shoot-out following a 0–0 draw at St James Park. During his semi-professional career he also worked in a sales job selling medical devices to hospitals.

=== Harrogate Town ===
On 15 May 2019, Hall signed for National League side Harrogate Town on a two-year contract; he was the club's first signing of the summer and was described as a "big target" by manager Simon Weaver. He played 33 league games before the 2019–20 season was halted and ultimately decided on goal average due to the COVID-19 pandemic in England, with the "Sulphurites" qualifying for the play-offs. He scored Harrogate Town's second goal in the play-off final as the club would go on to be promoted to the Football League for the first time in their history with a 3–1 victory over Notts County. In response to Harrogate's victory, Hall said "It's a dream come true to play at Wembley, win at Wembley, score at Wembley". He was named as the club's Player's Player of the Season. He was the subject of interest from a League One club in the summer, who failed to agree a fee with Harrogate.

He made his Football League debut on 5 September 2020 in a 1–1 draw against Tranmere Rovers in the EFL Cup, in which Harrogate won 8–7 in the resulting penalty shoot-out. He scored his first goal in the Football League on 1 December, in a 5–2 defeat to Scunthorpe United at Wetherby Road. He signed a new three-and-a-half-year contract with Harrogate in January. He ended the 2020–21 campaign with 44 appearances to his name as Town finished in 17th-place. On 3 May 2021, he won the FA Trophy with Harrogate in the long-delayed 2020 final behind closed doors at Wembley against Concord Rangers; Harrogate won the match 1–0. He remained a key first-team player in the first half of the 2021–22 season, playing 25 games.

=== Port Vale ===
On 11 January 2022, Hall joined fellow League Two side Port Vale in a permanent move. He joined the club for an undisclosed fee, signing a contract of undisclosed length, on the same day that veteran centre-back Leon Legge moved to Harrogate from Port Vale. His second goal for the club, a header at Hartlepool United, secured a 1–0 victory and important three points in the "Valiants" automatic promotion push; speaking after the match, Hall praised interim manager Andy Crosby and also stated that "all the staff, and the players as well, the whole club are all as one". He started in the play-off final at Wembley Stadium as Vale secured promotion with a 3–0 victory over Mansfield Town; Michael Baggaley of The Sentinel wrote that his "clearance off the line denied Mansfield a way back into the game" and that he put in a "calm defensive display".

He scored on the opening day of the 2022–23 campaign, his League One debut, as Vale came from behind to beat Fleetwood Town 2–1. He was dropped from the starting eleven following a loss of form in September, with Dan Jones playing in his stead, but regained his place the following month. However, he found the commute from his home in Cambridgeshire difficult, leaving director of football David Flitcroft and manager Darrell Clarke to agree to let him depart for a club closer to Cambridgeshire.

=== Colchester United ===
On 7 January 2023, Hall signed a two-and-a-half-year deal with League Two side Colchester United after being signed for an undisclosed fee. He served as captain in new manager Ben Garner's first match in charge, a 2–0 defeat at Bradford City on 5 March. He made 21 appearances in the second half of the 2022–23 season, scoring two goals, as the U's achieved their aim of avoiding relegation. He was named as club captain in July 2023. He underwent surgery on a hernia injury in November 2023 and was sidelined for a month as a result. Speaking the following month, manager Matty Etherington said that it was "a big plus" to have him return to fitness. Hall spoke out in favour of new manager Danny Cowley the following February after the side put together a four-match unbeaten run to pull away from the relegation zone. Hall left the club after Colchester received what Cowley said was a deal too good for them to turn down.

=== Return to Port Vale ===
On 1 July 2024, Hall returned to Port Vale, now in League Two, on a two-year deal for an undisclosed fee. Manager Darren Moore named him as a vice-captain. He showed a good level of consistency, starting all eight matches in March. On 4 March, he was included on the EFL Team of Midweek after having eight aerial wins, two interceptions and 21 clearances in a 0–0 home draw with former club Harrogate Town. He was named on the League Two Team of the Season at the EFL Awards. He made the most clearances (371), most blocks (29) and most interceptions (59) out of any Vale player in the 2024–25 promotion-winning season.

Hall was voted as the club's Player of the Month for March 2026 by readers of The Valiant substack, having started seven of eight games, helping the team to reach the quarter-finals of the FA Cup with wins over Bristol City and Sunderland. He was named as the club's Player's Player of the Year for the 2025–26 season. Manager Jon Brady said Hall had been "brilliant" and had an "incredible attitude". He made more league starts than any other Vale player in the season, which culminated in relegation. He triggered a contract extension to remain at the club for another season.

== Style of play ==
Hall is a central defender known for his physical strength and ability to play the ball from the back. He is also noted for his versatility, which allows him to operate in midfield when required.

== Career statistics ==
As of match played 21 November 2026

Appearances and goals by club, season and competition
Club	Season	League			FA Cup		EFL Cup		Other		Total	
Club	Season	Division	Apps	Goals	Apps	Goals	Apps	Goals	Apps	Goals	Apps	Goals
Bury Town	2011–12	Isthmian League; Premier Division	11	0			—		4 (Note: Cup competitions not specified in the source)	0	15	0
Bury Town	2012–13	Isthmian League; Premier Division	22	0			—		8	3	30	3
Bury Town	2013–14	Isthmian League; Premier Division	0	0	0	0	—		0	0	0	0
Bury Town	2014–15	Isthmian League; Premier Division	41	5			—		2	0	43	5
Bury Town	Total		74	5			0	0	14	3	88	8
St Neots Town	2015–16	Southern League; Premier Division	14	2	4	1	—		4 (Note: 2 appearances and 1 goal in the FA Trophy, 1 appearance in the Huntingdonshire Senior Cup and 1 appearance in the Southern Football League Cup)	1	22	4
Bury Town	2015–16	Isthmian League; Division One North	20	1			—		2	1	22	2
Biggleswade Town	2016–17 (Note: Statistics at Biggleswade Town are not known and are not included in the final totals)	Southern League; Premier Division										
Biggleswade Town	2017–18	Southern League; Premier Division										
Biggleswade Town	Total											
Brackley Town	2018–19	National League North	38	3	0	0	—		2 (Note: Appearance(s) in the FA Trophy)	0	40	3
Harrogate Town	2019–20	National League	33	3	2	0	—		6 (Note: 4 appearances and 1 goal in the FA Trophy, 2 appearances and 1 goal in the play-offs)	2	41	5
Harrogate Town	2020–21	EFL League Two	41	1	1	0	2	0	0	0	44	1
Harrogate Town	2021–22	EFL League Two	20	0	2	0	0	0	3 (Note: Appearance(s) in the EFL Trophy)	0	25	0
Harrogate Town	Total		94	4	5	0	2	0	9	2	110	6
Port Vale	2021–22	EFL League Two	24	2	—		—		3 (Note: Appearance(s) in the play-offs)	0	27	2
Port Vale	2022–23	EFL League One	20	1	0	0	0	0	5	0	25	1
Port Vale	Total		44	3	0	0	0	0	8	0	52	3
Colchester United	2022–23	EFL League Two	21	2	—		—		—		21	2
Colchester United	2023–24	EFL League Two	40	0	1	0	1	0	1	0	43	0
Colchester United	Total		61	2	1	0	1	0	1	0	64	2
Port Vale	2024–25	EFL League Two	44	0	1	0	0	0	1	0	46	0
Port Vale	2025–26	EFL League One	39	2	5	0	1	0	4	1	49	3
Port Vale	2026–27	EFL League Two	13	0	1	0	0	0	2	0	16	0
Port Vale	Total		96	2	7	0	1	0	7	1	111	3
Career total			441	22	17	1	4	0	47	8	509	31

== Honours ==
Harrogate Town

- National League play-offs: 2020
- FA Trophy: 2019–20

Port Vale

- EFL League Two play-offs: 2022
- EFL League Two second-place promotion: 2024–25

Individual

- EFL League Two Team of the Season: 2024–25
