= Gene Kennedy (footballer) =

English footballer (born 2003)

Personal information
- Full name: Gene John Kennedy
- Date of birth: 18 April 2003 (age 23)
- Place of birth: Harlow, England
- Height: 6 ft 2 in (1.88 m)
- Position: Midfielder

Team information
- Current team: Ebbsfleet United
- Number: 18

Youth career
- –2013: Kelvedon Hatch
- 2013–2021: Colchester United

Senior career*
Years	Team	Apps	(Gls)
2021–2024	Colchester United	6	(0)
2023	→ Braintree Town (loan)	4	(0)
2024	→ Welling United (loan)	16	(1)
2024–2025	Welling United	40	(8)
2025–	Ebbsfleet United	10	(0)
- * Club domestic league appearances and goals as of 01:34, 9 October 2025 (UTC)

Gene John Kennedy (born 18 April 2003) is an English professional footballer who plays as a midfielder for Ebbsfleet United.

== Career ==
A youth product of the Colchester United Academy since U10 level, Kennedy worked his way up through the youth categories at the club after joining from Kelvedon Hatch. He made his professional debut for Colchester in a 1–0 EFL Cup loss to Birmingham City on 10 August 2021. He made his English Football League debut for the club on 21 August 2021, coming off the bench in Colchester's 2–1 win at Oldham Athletic. He signed a new contract with Colchester in February 2022.

In February 2023, Kennedy joined National League South club Braintree Town on loan. He made 4 appearances on loan at the club.

He joined Welling United on loan in February 2024, and made 16 appearances during this loan. He was released by Colchester at the end of the season, and joined Welling on a permanent basis in summer 2024.

On 25 June 2025, Kennedy turned down a new contract with Welling United and instead signed for fellow National League South club Ebbsfleet United.

== Career statistics ==
As of match played 9 October 2025

Appearances and goals by club, season and competition
Club	Season	League			FA Cup		League Cup		Other		Total	
Club	Season	Division	Apps	Goals	Apps	Goals	Apps	Goals	Apps	Goals	Apps	Goals
Colchester United	2021–22	League Two	6	0	0	0	1	0	2 (Note: Appearances in EFL Trophy)	0	9	0
Colchester United	2022–23	League Two	0	0	0	0	0	0	0	0	0	0
Colchester United	2023–24	League Two	0	0	0	0	0	0	3	0	3	0
Colchester United	Total		6	0	0	0	1	0	5	0	12	0
Braintree Town (loan)	2022–23	National League South	4	0	0	0	—		0	0	4	0
Welling United (loan)	2023–24	National League South	16	1	0	0	—		0	0	16	1
Welling United	2024–25	National League South	40	8	0	0	—		1 (Note: Appearance(s) in FA Trophy)	0	41	8
Welling United	Total		56	9	0	0	—		1	0	57	9
Ebbsfleet United	2025–26	National League South	10	0	0	0	—		0	0	10	0
Career total			76	9	0	0	1	0	6	0	83	9
