= Noah Chilvers =

English footballer (born 2001)

Personal information
- Full name: Noah Christopher Chilvers
- Date of birth: 22 February 2001 (age 25)
- Place of birth: Chelmsford, England
- Height: 1.78 m (5 ft 10 in)
- Position: Central midfielder

Team information
- Current team: Oldham Athletic

Youth career
- –2009: Chelmsford City
- 2009–2018: Colchester United

Senior career*
Years	Team	Apps	(Gls)
2019–2024	Colchester United	172	(23)
2019–2020	→ Bath City (loan)	21	(2)
2024–2026	Ross County	35	(4)
2026–	Oldham Athletic	0	(0)
- * Club domestic league appearances and goals as of 4 May 2026

Noah Christopher Chilvers (born 22 February 2001) is an English professional footballer who plays as an central midfielder for EFL League Two club Oldham Athletic.

Chilvers joined Colchester United's Academy at under-9 level from Chelmsford City. He made his professional debut for Colchester in March 2019. He then joined National League South side Bath City on loan in October 2019.

== Career ==
=== Colchester United ===
Born in Chelmsford, Chilvers played for hometown club Chelmsford City until under-9 level, where he signed for Colchester United. He attended Southend High School for Boys. He signed on as a scholar with Colchester in July 2017.

Chilvers was captain of the under-18 side during the 2018–19 season and became a regular in the under-23 side. He was called up to the first-team squad for the first time in November 2018 for the FA Cup first round tie at Accrington Stanley and was handed squad number 27.

On 9 March 2019, Chilvers made his professional debut from the bench during Colchester's 3–0 home win against Newport County. He replaced Sammie Szmodics after 89-minutes.

On 21 May 2019, Chilvers signed a contract extension with the club.

On 18 October 2019, Chilvers signed a one-month loan deal with National League South side Bath City. He made his debut on 19 October in Bath's 1–0 win at St Albans City. He scored his first goal for the club on 2 November in a 3–1 win at Dulwich Hamlet.

Chilvers scored his first professional goal for Colchester on 26 September 2020 during their 1–1 draw at Barrow. He then signed a new three-year contract on 5 October to keep him with the club until summer 2023.

On the back of his breakthrough season, where he scored three goals and made 49 first-team appearances, Chilvers was named both Colchester United Player of the Year and Young Player of the Year as well as receiving the Goal of the Season award at the end of the 2020–21 campaign.

Chilvers played his last game for the club on the 27 April 2024 against Crewe Alexandra where he scored in a 1–1 draw.

On 31 July 2024, Colchester announced that Chilvers had left the club and signed for Scottish Premiership side Ross County for an undisclosed fee after having made over 200 appearances for the first team.

=== Ross County ===
On 31 July 2024, Chilvers signed for Ross County on a three-year deal. On 3 August 2024, he made his debut as a substitute in a 0–0 draw against Motherwell.

=== Oldham Athletic ===
On 8 July 2026, Chilvers signed for Oldham Athletic.

== Career statistics ==
As of 1 May 2026

Appearances and goals by club, season and competition
Club	Season	League			Cup		League Cup		Other		Total	
Club	Season	Division	Apps	Goals	Apps	Goals	Apps	Goals	Apps	Goals	Apps	Goals
Colchester United	2018–19	League Two	2	0	0	0	0	0	0	0	2	0
Colchester United	2019–20	League Two	0	0	0	0	1	0	2 (Note: Appearance(s) in EFL Trophy)	0	3	0
Colchester United	2020–21	League Two	44	2	1	0	1	0	3	1	49	3
Colchester United	2021–22	League Two	38	8	2	0	1	0	4	0	45	8
Colchester United	2022–23	League Two	42	9	1	0	2	0	3	0	48	9
Colchester United	2023–24	League Two	46	4	1	0	1	0	4	0	51	4
Colchester United	Total		172	23	5	0	6	0	16	1	198	24
Bath City (loan)	2019–20	National League South	21	2	0	0	–		3 (Note: Appearances in FA Trophy)	0	24	2
Ross County	2024–25	Scottish Premiership	30	3	1	0	1	0	–		32	3
Ross County	2025–26	Scottish Championship	5	1	0	0	0	0	–		5	1
Ross County	Total		35	4	1	0	1	0	0	0	37	4
Career total			228	29	6	0	7	0	19	1	259	30

== Honours ==
Individual

- Colchester United Player of the Year: 2020–21
