= Alex Newby =

English footballer (born 1995)

Personal information
- Full name: Alexander Lewis Newby
- Date of birth: 21 November 1995 (age 31)
- Place of birth: Barrow-in-Furness, England
- Height: 5 ft 8 in (1.73 m)
- Position: Midfielder

Team information
- Current team: York City
- Number: 30

Youth career
- Bolton Wanderers
- Barrow

Senior career*
| Years | Team | Apps | (Gls) |
| 2015–2016 | Barrow | 1 | (0) |
| 2016 | → Kendal Town (loan) | | |
| 2016–2018 | Clitheroe | | |
| 2018–2020 | Chorley | 88 | (21) |
| 2020–2022 | Rochdale | 74 | (12) |
| 2022–2024 | Colchester United | 34 | (3) |
| 2023–2024 | → Altrincham (loan) | 18 | (7) |
| 2024–2025 | Altrincham | 61 | (21) |
| 2025– | York City | 54 | (18) |
- * Club domestic league appearances and goals as of 14:31, 22 November 2026 (UTC)

Alexander Lewis Newby (born 21 November 1995) is an English professional footballer who plays as a midfielder for EFL League Two club York City.

== Career ==
Born in Barrow-in-Furness, Newby began his career with Bolton Wanderers, and played non-league football for Barrow, Kendal Town and Clitheroe, before signing for Chorley in February 2018.

He moved to Rochdale in August 2020, signing a two-year contract. On 8 September 2020 he scored his first goal for Rochdale in an EFL Trophy tie against Morecambe. In June 2022 it was announced that he would sign for Colchester United on 1 July 2022, on a free transfer.

On 21 September 2023 Newby signed for Altrincham on loan until January. On 30 January 2024, he joined the club on a permanent deal.

On 10 June 2025, Newby agreed to join National League side York City upon the expiration of his contract with Altrincham.

== Personal life ==
His twin brother Elliot is also a footballer.

== Career statistics ==
As of match played 27 January 2024

Appearances and goals by club, season and competition
| Club | Season | League | | | FA Cup | | League Cup | | Other | | Total | |
| Club | Season | Division | Apps | Goals | Apps | Goals | Apps | Goals | Apps | Goals | Apps | Goals |
|---|---|---|---|---|---|---|---|---|---|---|---|---|
| Rochdale | 2020–21 | League One | 38 | 6 | 1 | 0 | 2 | 0 | 2 (Note: Appearance(s) in EFL Trophy) | 1 | 43 | 7 |
| Rochdale | 2021–22 | League Two | 36 | 6 | 1 | 0 | 1 | 0 | 1 | 39 | 6 | |
| Rochdale | Total | | 74 | 12 | 2 | 0 | 3 | 0 | 3 | 1 | 82 | 13 |
| Colchester United | 2022–23 | League Two | 32 | 3 | 0 | 0 | 1 | 0 | 3 | 0 | 36 | 3 |
| Colchester United | 2023–24 | League Two | 2 | 0 | 0 | 0 | 0 | 0 | 1 | 0 | 3 | 0 |
| Colchester United | Total | | 34 | 3 | 0 | 0 | 1 | 0 | 4 | 0 | 39 | 3 |
| Altrincham (loan) | 2023–24 | National League | 18 | 7 | 1 | 0 | — | | 1 (Note: Appearance(s) in FA Trophy) | 0 | 20 | 7 |
| Career total | | | 136 | 22 | 3 | 0 | 4 | 0 | 8 | 1 | 141 | 23 |

== Honours ==
York City

- National League: 2025–26
