= Junior Tchamadeu =

Cameroonian footballer (born 2003)

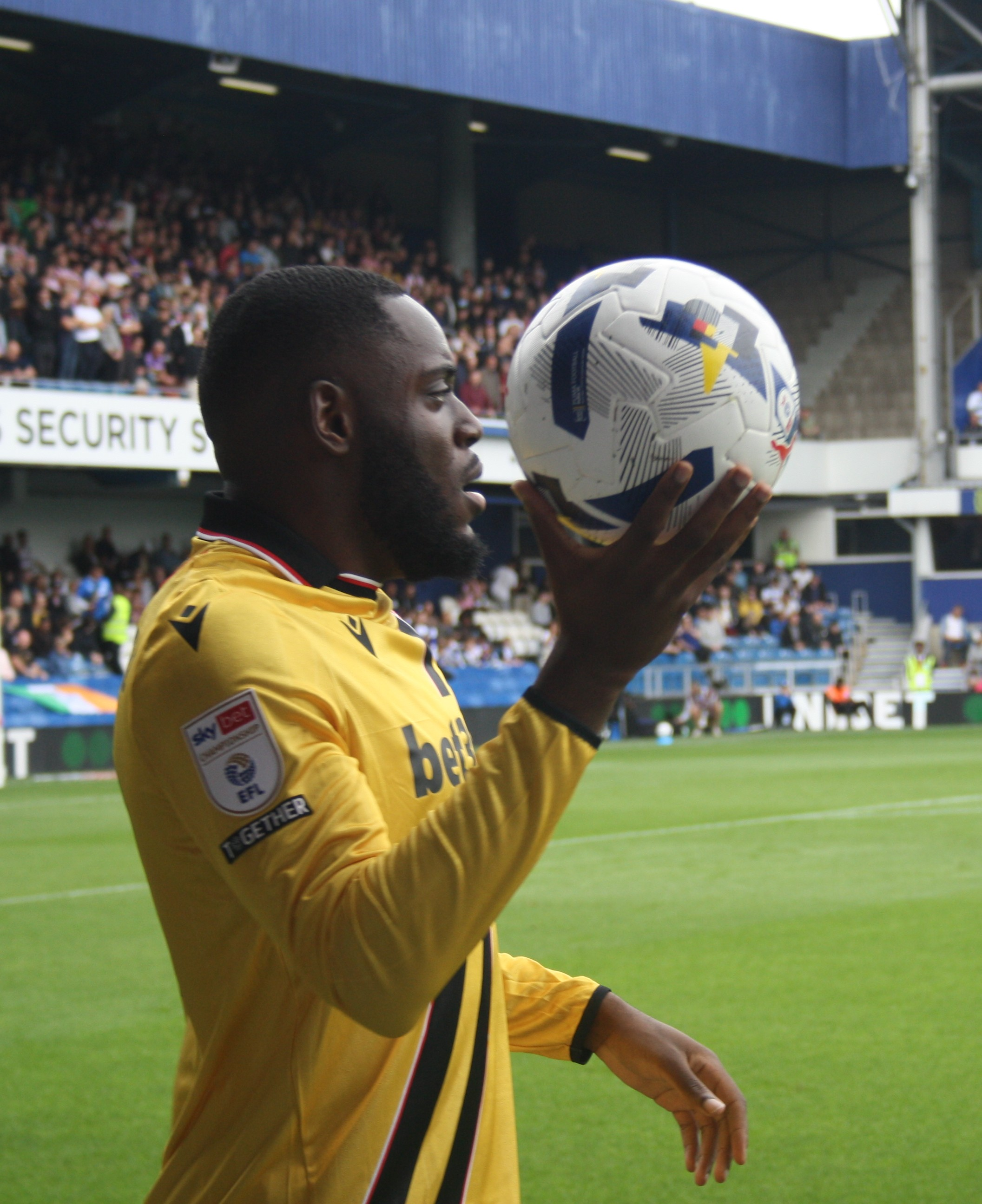
- Junior Tchamadeu in 2025.

Personal information
- Full name: Junior Baptiste Tchamadeu
- Date of birth: 22 December 2003 (age 22)
- Place of birth: Barking, London, England
- Height: 1.80 m (5 ft 11 in)
- Position: Full back

Team information
- Current team: Stoke City
- Number: 22

Youth career
- 2013–2020: Charlton Athletic
- 2020: Colchester United

Senior career*
Years	Team	Apps	(Gls)
2020–2023	Colchester United	82	(6)
2023–	Stoke City	91	(2)

International career^{‡}
2023–	Cameroon	10	(1)
- * Club domestic league appearances and goals as of 20:40, 21 November 2026 (UTC) ‡ National team caps and goals as of 22:00, 29 September 2026 (UTC)

Junior Baptiste Tchamadeu (born 22 December 2003) is a professional footballer who plays as a right back for EFL Championship club Stoke City. Born in England, he plays for the Cameroon national team.

== Club career ==
=== Colchester United ===
Tchamadeu was born in Barking, London, and attended Gascoigne Primary School and All Saints Catholic School. He joined the Charlton Athletic academy at the age of ten but was released at 16. After trials with Luton Town and Tottenham Hotspur, Tchamadeu joined League Two side Colchester United on a scholarship. He became Colchester United's youngest-ever starting debutant at 16 years and 349 days on 5 December 2020 when he was named in the starting eleven for Colchester's 2–1 victory against Grimsby Town.

On 5 July 2021, he signed a three-year contract extension with the club. On 19 October 2021, he was sent off for the first time in his career for violent conduct following an altercation with Bristol Rovers' Trevor Clarke. On 26 March 2022, Tchamadeu scored his first career senior goal with a 95th-minute winner against Tranmere Rovers, securing a vital win to move Colchester closer to safety. At the end of the 2021–22 season, Tchamadeu won the EFL League Two Apprentice of the Season award at the 2022 EFL Awards. He was awarded the EFL Young Player of the Month award for January 2023, having featured in every minute played as they took thirteen points from six matches. In 2022–23, Tchamadeu made 46 appearances, scoring five goals as Colchester avoided relegation, finishing in 20th position. At the end of the season, Tchamadeu was named Colchester's Player of the Year. Following his success with Colchester, Tchamadeu was linked with a move to Championship clubs in the summer of 2023.

=== Stoke City ===
Tchamadeu signed for EFL Championship side Stoke City on 1 September 2023 for an undisclosed fee on a four-year contract. Tchamadeu's first season with Stoke was disrupted as after playing for Cameroon at the Africa Cup of Nations he suffered an ankle injury on his return. He made 15 appearances for Stoke in 2023–24 as the team successfully avoided relegation. He scored his first goal for Stoke on 29 March 2025 in a 3–1 victory against Queens Park Rangers. In the 2024–25 season Tchamadeu was a regular starter under three different managers, playing 45 times as Stoke avoided relegation on the final day.

Tchamadeu played 26 times in 2025–26, as Stoke finished in 17th. His season was disrupted by a knee injury he suffered playing for Cameroon at the Africa Cup of Nations. In May 2026 he signed a new two-year contract extension.

== International career ==
In November 2023, Tchamadeu was called up to the Cameroon national team by Rigobert Song.

== Career statistics ==
=== Club ===
As of match played 21 November 2026

Appearances and goals by club, season and competition
Club	Season	League			FA Cup		League Cup		Other		Total	
Club	Season	Division	Apps	Goals	Apps	Goals	Apps	Goals	Apps	Goals	Apps	Goals
Colchester United	2020–21	League Two	11	0	0	0	0	0	0	0	11	0
Colchester United	2021–22	League Two	26	1	2	0	0	0	5 (Note: Appearances in EFL Trophy)	0	33	1
Colchester United	2022–23	League Two	41	5	1	0	2	0	2	0	46	5
Colchester United	2023–24	League Two	4	0	0	0	1	0	0	0	5	0
Colchester United	Total		82	6	3	0	3	0	7	0	95	6
Stoke City	2023–24	Championship	15	0	0	0	0	0	—		15	0
Stoke City	2024–25	Championship	41	1	2	0	2	0	—		45	1
Stoke City	2025–26	Championship	26	1	0	0	0	0	—		26	1
Stoke City	2026–27	Championship	9	0	0	0	0	0	—		9	0
Stoke City	Total		91	2	2	0	2	0	0	0	95	2
Career Total			173	8	5	0	5	0	7	0	190	8

=== International ===
As of match played 29 September 2026

Appearances and goals by national team and year
National team	Year	Apps	Goals
Cameroon	2023	2	0
Cameroon	2024	3	0
Cameroon	2025	2	0
Cameroon	2026	3	1
Total		10	1

As of match played 4 January 2026
Cameroon score listed first, score column indicates score after each Tchamadeu goal.

List of international goals scored by Junior Tchamadeu
No.	Date	Venue	Opponent	Score	Result	Competition
1	4 January 2026	Al Medina Stadium, Rabat, Morocco	South Africa	1–0	2–1	2025 Africa Cup of Nations

== Honours ==
Individual

- EFL League Two Young Player of the Season: 2022–23
- EFL League Two Team of the Season: 2022–23
- PFA Team of the Year: 2022–23 League Two
- EFL League Two Apprentice of the Season: 2021–22
- EFL Young Player of the Month: January 2023
- Colchester United Player of the Year: 2022–23
