= 2022–23 Colchester United F.C. season =

Colchester United FC
2022–23 season
- Chairman: Robbie Cowling
- Head Coach: Wayne Brown (until 18 September); Matt Bloomfield (between 30 September – 21 February); Ben Garner (from 2 March)
- Stadium: Colchester Community Stadium
- League Two: 20th
- FA Cup: First round
- EFL Cup: Second round
- EFL Trophy: Second round
Home colours	Away colours

The 2022–23 season is the 86th season in the existence of Colchester United Football Club and the club's seventh consecutive season in League Two. In addition to the league, they also competed in the 2022–23 FA Cup, the 2022–23 EFL Cup and the 2022–23 EFL Trophy.

== Transfers ==
=== In ===
Date	Pos	Player	Transferred from	Fee	Ref
28 June 2022	GK	(England) Sam Hornby	(England) Bradford City	Undisclosed	
1 July 2022 (Note: The transfer was announced on 28 June, and would become official on July 1, once his Rochdale contract expired)	RW	(England) Alex Newby	(England) Rochdale	Free Transfer	
14 July 2022	CM	(England) Ossama Ashley	(England) West Ham United	Free Transfer	
3 August 2022	GK	(Republic of Ireland) Kieran O'Hara	(England) Fleetwood Town	Free Transfer	
7 September 2022	LB	(England) Lion Bello	(England) Crystal Palace	Free Transfer	
5 October 2022	LB	(England) Jayden Fevrier	(England) West Ham United	Free Transfer	
3 January 2023	CM	(England) Arthur Read	(England) Stevenage	Undisclosed	
4 January 2023	CB	(Republic of Ireland) Fiacre Kelleher	(England) Bradford City	Undisclosed	
7 January 2023	CB	(England) Connor Hall	(England) Port Vale	Undisclosed	
9 January 2023	SS	(England) Matt Jay	(England) Exeter City	Undisclosed	
16 January 2023	LW	(England) Oscar Thorn	(England) Norwich City	Undisclosed	
26 January 2023	CF	(England) Tom Hopper	(England) Lincoln City	Undisclosed	
27 January 2023	RB	(England) Will Greenidge	(England) West Ham United	Free Transfer	

=== Out ===
Date	Pos	Player	Transferred to	Fee	Ref
21 June 2022	CM	(England) Brendan Wiredu	(England) Fleetwood Town	Undisclosed	
30 June 2022	CM	(England) Sam Cornish	(England) Wingate & Finchley	Released	
30 June 2022	AM	(Portugal) Diogo Freitas Gouveia	(England) Hitchin Town	Released	
30 June 2022	CB	(England) Camron Gbadebo	Unattached	Released	
30 June 2022	GK	(England) Dean Gerken	Retired	—N/a	
30 June 2022	AM	(England) Andre Hasanally	(England) St Neots Town	Released	
30 June 2022	RW	(England) Bryan Ifeanyi	(England) Aveley	Released	
30 June 2022	MF	(England) Emmanuel Martins	Unattached	Released	
30 June 2022	CF	(England) Thomas Stagg	(England) Billericay Town	Released	
30 June 2022	RB	(England) Miles Welch-Hayes	(England) Harrogate Town	Released	
23 July 2022	GK	(England) Shamal George	(Scotland) Livingston	Undisclosed	
1 January 2023	RB	(Wales) Cameron Coxe	(England) Boreham Wood	Undisclosed	
17 March 2023	CF	(England) Frank Nouble	(England) Torquay United	Released	
12 May 2023	DM	(England) Cole Skuse	Retired	—N/a	

=== Loans in ===
Date	Pos	Player	Loaned from	On loan until	Ref
12 August 2022	DM	(Northern Ireland) Charlie Owens	(England) Queens Park Rangers	7 January 2023	
26 August 2022	RM	(England) Daniel Chesters	(England) West Ham United	6 January 2023 (Note: On 6 January, Chesters returned to West Ham)	
30 August 2022	LW	(Democratic Republic of the Congo) Beryly Lubala	(England) Blackpool	3 January 2023 (Note: On 3 January, Lubala's loan was cut-short and he returned to Blackpool)	
1 September 2022	CF	(Ghana) Kwesi Appiah	(England) Crawley Town	End of Season	
1 September 2022	CM	(England) Matty Longstaff	(England) Newcastle United	1 January 2023 (Note: On 1 January, Longstaff returned to Newcastle due to a serious knee injury.)	
1 January 2023	LB	(England) Connor Wood	(England) Leyton Orient	End of Season	
30 January 2023	GK	(England) Tom Smith	(England) Arsenal	End of Season	

=== Loans out ===
Date	Pos	Player	Loaned to	On loan until	Ref
4 August 2022	CF	(England) Jake Hutchinson	(England) Eastbourne Borough	1 January 2023	
12 August 2022	CF	(England) Bradley Ihionvien	(England) Maldon & Tiptree	1 January 2023	
12 August 2022	LM	(England) Harvey Sayer	(England) Maldon & Tiptree	1 January 2023	
26 August 2022	GK	(England) Ted Collins	(England) Potters Bar Town	26 September 2022	
30 September 2022	CB	(England) Frankie Terry	(England) Chelmsford City	End of Season (Note: On 10 January, Terry's loan at Chelmsford was extended until end of the season)	
10 October 2022	CF	(England) Kaan Bennett	(England) Needham Market	10 November 2022	
13 October 2022	RB	(Wales) Cameron Coxe	(England) Boreham Wood	1 January 2023	
3 January 2023	CF	(England) Jake Hutchinson	(England) Aldershot Town	End of Season	
26 January 2023	CB	(England) Tom Eastman	(England) Harrogate Town	End of Season	
27 January 2023	LB	(England) Ryan Clampin	(Scotland) Dundee	End of Season	
31 January 2023	LM	(England) Luke Hannant	(Scotland) Dundee	End of Season	
2 February 2023	AM	(England) Chay Cooper	(England) St Albans City	End of Season	
15 February 2023	CM	(England) Gene Kennedy	(England) Braintree Town	15 March 2023	
17 February 2023	LM	(England) Harvey Sayer	(England) Stowmarket Town	17 March 2023	

== Pre-season and friendlies ==
A match with Potters Bar Town was confirmed on 20 May. The U's announced their first pre-season friendly against Southend United at home. On June 10, Colchester revealed three more pre-season matches. A behind-closed-doors friendly with Reading was next to be confirmed. A further home friendly against Charlton Athletic was added to the schedule in July. Wayne Brown would also take an XI side to face Chelmsford City.

Win Draw Loss Fixtures

2 July 2022 Friendly	Reading	2–0	Colchester United	Finchampstead
TBA BST	4' (o.g.); Méïté 17' (pen.)	Report		Stadium: Hogwood Park Training Ground; Attendance: 0 (behind-closed-doors)

5 July 2022 Friendly	Swansea City	0–2	Colchester United	Upper Killay
14:00 BST		Report	Hannant (?); Nouble (?)	Stadium: Fairwood Training Ground; Attendance: 0 (behind-closed-doors)

5 July 2022 Friendly	Swansea City	1–0	Colchester United	Upper Killay
15:30 BST	Latibeaudiere (?)	Report		Stadium: Fairwood Training Ground; Attendance: 0 (behind-closed-doors)

6 July 2022 Friendly	Bath City	1–3	Colchester United	Bath
19:00 BST	Spokes 10'	Report	Trialist 45'; Hutchinson 52'; Hannant 90+3'	Stadium: Twerton Park

9 July 2022 Friendly	Tottenham Hotspur U21s	1–0	Colchester United	Enfield
13:00 BST	Mathurin 66'	Report		Stadium: Hotspur Way Training Ground; Attendance: 0 (behind-closed doors)

12 July 2022 Friendly	Colchester United	2–4	Charlton Athletic	Colchester
19:30 BST	Sears (?); Smith (?)	Report	Gilbey (?); Leaburn (?); Morgan (?); Judge (?)	Stadium: JobServe Community Stadium

15 July 2022 Friendly	Colchester United	0–1	Millwall	Colchester
19:30 BST		Report	Cooper 45+2'	Stadium: JobServe Community Stadium

19 July 2022 Friendly	Colchester United	2–2	Southend United	Colchester
19:30 BST	Sears 23'; Akinde 90+2'	Report	Mooney 71'; Miley 85'	Stadium: JobServe Community Stadium

20 July 2022 Friendly	Chelmsford City	0–3	Colchester United XI	Chelmsford
19:45 BST		Report	Tovide 62'; Marshall 72'; Ashley 83'	Stadium: Melbourne Stadium

23 July 2022 Friendly	Ebbsfleet United	2–2	Colchester United	Northfleet
15:00 BST	Bingham 42', 60'	Report	Chilvers 12'; Sears 67'	Stadium: Stonebridge Road

== Competitions ==
=== Overall record ===
Competition	First match	Last match	Starting round	Record							
Competition	First match	Last match	Starting round	Pld	W	D	L	GF	GA	GD	Win %
League Two	August 2022	May 2023	Matchday 1	9	1	3	5	7	13	−6	11.11
FA Cup	TBC	TBC	Third round	0	0	0	0	0	0	+0	—
EFL Cup	August 2022	August 2022	First round	2	1	0	1	1	2	−1	50.00
EFL Trophy	September 2022	TBC	Group stage	1	1	0	0	2	1	+1	100.00
Total				12	3	3	6	10	16	−6	25.00

Last updated: pre-season
Source: [ Soccerway]

=== League Two ===
==== League table ====
Pos	Team	Pld	W	D	L	GF	GA	GD	Pts	Promotion, qualification or relegation
17	Gillingham	46	14	13	19	36	49	−13	55	
18	Doncaster Rovers	46	16	7	23	46	65	−19	55	
19	Harrogate Town	46	12	16	18	59	68	−9	52	
20	Colchester United	46	12	13	21	44	51	−7	49	
21	AFC Wimbledon	46	11	15	20	48	60	−12	48	
22	Crawley Town	46	11	13	22	48	71	−23	46	
23	Hartlepool United (R)	46	9	16	21	52	78	−26	43	Relegation to National League

Source: EFL Official Website
Rules for classification: 1) Points; 2) Goal difference; 3) Number of goals scored; 4) Head-to-head results; 5) Wins; 6) Away goals; 7) Penalty points (sec 9.5); 8) 12-point sending off offences
(R) Relegated

==== Results summary ====
Overall								Home						Away					
Pld	W	D	L	GF	GA	GD	Pts	W	D	L	GF	GA	GD	W	D	L	GF	GA	GD
46	12	13	21	44	51	−7	49	6	9	8	25	23	+2	6	4	13	19	28	−9

Last updated: 29 April 2023.
Source: [ Soccerway]

==== Results by round ====
Round	1	2	3	4	5	6	7	8	9	10	11	12	13	14	15	16	17	18	19	20	21	22	23	24	25	26	27	28	29	30	31	32	33	34	35	36	37	38	39	40	41	42	43	44	45
Ground	A	H	A	H	H	A	H	A	H	H	A	H	A	A	H	H	A	A	H	A	A	A	H	H	A	A	H	H	A	H	A	H	A	H	A	H	A	H	H	A	H	A	A	H	A
Result	L	D	L	W	L	L	D	D	L	L	L	W	L	L	D	D	L	L	W	L	L	W	L	W	W	W	L	D	W	D	W	D	L	L	L	L	D	D	D	D	W	W	D	W	L
Position	15	14	20	15	18	20	20	21	21	21	21	20	22	23	23	24	24	24	22	22	23	22	22	21	20	19	19	18	17	17	16	16	18	19	19	20	21	21	21	21	20	20	20	19	20

Updated to match(es) played on 29 April 2023. Source: [ Soccerway]
A = Away; H = Home; W = Win; D = Draw; L = Loss; P = Postponed

==== Matches ====
Win Draw Loss Fixtures

On 23 June, the league fixtures were announced.

30 July 2022 1	Northampton Town	3–2	Colchester United	Sixfields
15:00 BST	Hoskins 27', 74' (pen.); McWilliams (yellow card) 55'; Haynes 89'	Report	Sears 42' (pen.); Hannant (yellow card) 72'; Coxe (yellow card) 73'; Nouble (yellow card) 76'; Chilvers 79', (yellow card) 83'	Stadium: PTS Academy Stadium; Attendance: 5,463; Referee: Martin Woods

6 August 2022 2	Colchester United	1–1	Carlisle United	Colchester
15:00 BST	Chilvers 19'	Report	Dennis 44'; Back (yellow card) 74'; Barclay (yellow card) 82'	Stadium: JobServe Community Stadium; Attendance: 3,137; Referee: James Oldham

13 August 2022 3	Stockport County	1–0	Colchester United	Edgeley
15:00 BST	Wootton 67'	Report	Chilvers (yellow card) 21'; Marshall (yellow card) 65'	Stadium: Edgeley Park; Attendance: 7,826; Referee: David Rock

16 August 2022 4	Colchester United	1–0	Bradford City	Colchester
19:45 BST	Eastman 90+7'	Report	Platt (yellow card) 44'; Angol (yellow card) 74'; Halliday (yellow card) 78'; Cook (yellow card) 90+2'	Stadium: JobServe Community Stadium; Attendance: 3,011; Referee: Carl Brook

20 August 2022 5	Colchester United	1–3	Leyton Orient	Colchester
15:00 BST	Chilvers 90+6'	Report	Chambers 16' (o.g.); James (yellow card) 70'; Thompson (yellow card) 72'; Archibald (yellow card) 76', (goal) 77'; Kelman 90'	Stadium: JobServe Community Stadium; Attendance: 4,340; Referee: Thomas Kirk

27 August 2022 6	Tranmere Rovers	2–0	Colchester United	Birkenhead
15:00 BST	Hawkes 4'; Byrne (yellow card) 19'; Burton 83'	Report	Tchamadeu (yellow card) 73'	Stadium: Prenton Park; Attendance: 5,041; Referee: Rebecca Welch

3 September 2022 7	Colchester United	1–1	Hartlepool United	Colchester
15:00 BST	Marshall-Miranda (yellow card) 8'; Longstaff (yellow card) 71'; Lubala 90+4'	Report	McDonald 29'; Tumilty (yellow card) 54'; Crawford (yellow card) 72'; Paterson (yellow card) 83'	Stadium: JobServe Community Stadium; Attendance: 2,983; Referee: Thomas Parsons

10 September 2022	Barrow	Postponed	Colchester United	Barrow-in-Furness
15:00 BST				Stadium: Holker Street
Note: Fixture was postponed as a mark of respect following the passing of Queen Elizabeth II.

13 September 2022 8	Walsall	1–1	Colchester United	Bescot
19:45 BST	Comley (yellow card) 16'; Hutchinson (yellow card) 21'; Knowles 61'	Report	Nouble 2'; Appiah (yellow card) 22'; Eastman (yellow card) 30'; Coxe (yellow card) 43'; Lubala (yellow card) 49'	Stadium: Poundland Bescot Stadium; Attendance: 4,327; Referee: Carl Boyeson

17 September 2022 9	Colchester United	0–1	Grimsby Town	Colchester
15:00 BST	Longstaff (yellow card) 36'	Report	Efete (yellow card) 42'; Clifton 63'; Kiernan (yellow card) 78'	Stadium: JobServe Community Stadium; Attendance: 3,167; Referee: Sunny Gill

24 September 2022 10	Colchester United	0–1	Rochdale	Colchester
15:00 BST	O'Hara (yellow card) 22'; Dallison (yellow card) 51'; Sears (penalty missed) 90+1	Report	Rodney 23' (pen.); Ball (yellow card) 37'; Odoh (yellow card) 87'; Seriki (yellow card) 90+5'	Stadium: JobServe Community Stadium; Attendance: 2,784; Referee: Tom Nield

1 October 2022 11	AFC Wimbledon	2–1	Colchester United	Wimbledon
15:00 BST	Davison 47' 66' (pen.) (yellow card) 90+1'; Assal (yellow card) 72'; Ogundere (yellow card) 87'; Kalambayi (yellow card) 90+5'; Chislett (yellow card) 90+6'	Report	Appiah 18'; Tchamadeu (yellow card) 31'; Hannant (yellow card) 40'; Skuse (yellow card) 90+1'	Stadium: The Cherry Red Records Stadium; Attendance: 7,328; Referee: Tom Reeves

8 October 2022 12	Colchester United	2–1	Harrogate Town	Colchester
15:00 BST	Appiah 8'; Nouble 37'; Skuse (yellow card) 52'; Chambers (yellow card) 82'; Lubala (yellow card) 90+1'	Report	Mattock (yellow card) 37'; Falkingham (yellow card) 48'; Pattison 57'; Burrell (yellow card) 74'	Stadium: JobServe Community Stadium; Attendance: 2,750; Referee: Craig Hicks

15 October 2022 13	Swindon Town	1–0	Colchester United	Swindon
15:00 BST	Shade 64'; Gladwin (yellow card) 88'	Report	Marshall-Miranda (yellow card) 37'; Tchamadeu (yellow card) 45+1'	Stadium: The County Ground; Attendance: 8,632; Referee: Andy Haines

22 October 2022 14	Newport County	1–0	Colchester United	Newport
15:00 BST	Evans 7'	Report		Stadium: Rodney Parade; Attendance: 3,994; Referee: Andrew Kitchen

25 October 2022 15	Colchester United	2–2	Crawley Town	Colchester
19:45 BST	Tchamadeu (yellow card) 18' (goal) 62'; Newby 20'	Report	Hessenthaler (yellow card) 32'; Nadesan 45' (yellow card) 45+6'; Tilley 46'; Tsaroulla (yellow card) 81'	Stadium: JobServe Community Stadium; Attendance: 2,931; Referee: Paul Howard

29 October 2022 16	Colchester United	1–1	Stevenage	Colchester
15:00 BST	Marshall-Miranda 6' (yellow card) 72'	Report	Rose 17'; Piergianni (yellow card) 76'; James-Wildin (yellow card) 86'; Earley (yellow card) 90+2'	Stadium: JobServe Community Stadium; Attendance: 3,486; Referee: Ben Speedie

1 November 2022 17	Barrow	3–1	Colchester United	Barrow-in-Furness
19:45 GMT	Waters 22', 25', 46'; Farman (yellow card) 84'; Moyo (yellow card) 89'	Report	Sears 90+1'; Tchamadeu (yellow card) 90+5'	Stadium: Furness Building Society Stadium; Attendance: 3,224; Referee: Darren Bond

12 November 2022 18	Crewe Alexandra	1–0	Colchester United	Crewe
15:00 GMT	Offord (yellow card) 34'; Agyei 80'; Uwakwe (yellow card) 90+2'	Report	Ashley (yellow card) 10'; Nouble (yellow card) 66'; Hannant (yellow card) 72'	Stadium: Mornflake Stadium; Attendance: 3,814; Referee: Thomas Parsons

19 November 2022 19	Colchester United	3–0	Doncaster Rovers	Colchester
15:00 GMT	Hannant (yellow card) 23' (goal) 89'; Newby 45+1'; Tovide 59'; Ashley (yellow card) 82'; Tchamadeu (yellow card) 85'	Report	Hurst (yellow card) 11'; Long (yellow card) 45'; Anderson (yellow card) 88'	Stadium: JobServe Community Stadium; Attendance: 3,607; Referee: Tom Nield

3 December 2022 20	Mansfield Town	2–1	Colchester United	Mansfield
15:00 GMT	Hawkins (yellow card) 29'; Swan 34', (yellow card) 67'; Akins 90+2'	Report	Newby 10'; Chambers (yellow card) 85'; Dallison (yellow card) 90+4'	Stadium: One Call Stadium; Attendance: 5,918; Referee: Ross Joyce

10 December 2022 21	Sutton United	1–0	Colchester United	Sutton
15:00 GMT	Milsom 45+9' (pen.); Boldewijn (yellow card) 67'; Randall (yellow card) 69'; Kizzi (yellow card) 90+5'	Report	Smith (yellow card) 18'; Ashley (yellow card) 45+1' (yellow-red card) 52'; Tchamadeu (yellow card) 69'; Tovide (yellow card) 90+5'	Stadium: VBS Community Stadium; Attendance: 2,528; Referee: Peter Wright

17 December 2022	Colchester United	Postponed	Salford City	Colchester
15:00 GMT				Stadium: JobServe Community Stadion
Note: Fixture was postponed due to a frozen pitch.

26 December 2022 22	Gillingham	0–1	Colchester United	Gillingham
15:00 GMT	Ehmer (yellow card) 45+2'; Tutonda (yellow card) 68'; Kashket (yellow card) 90+10'	Report	Tchamadeu 26'; Tovide (yellow card) 45+2'	Stadium: Priestfield; Attendance: 4,962; Referee: Sam Purkiss

29 December 2022 23	Colchester United	1–2	AFC Wimbledon	Colchester
19:45 GMT	Chambers (yellow card) 11'; Tovide (yellow card) 36'; Akinde (yellow card) 41', (goal) 51' (pen.)	Report	Currie (yellow card) 23'; Tzanev (yellow card) 51'; Davison 67'; Chislett 89'	Stadium: JobServe Community Stadium; Attendance: 4,025; Referee: Lee Swabey

1 January 2023 24	Colchester United	1–0	Swindon Town	Colchester
15:00 GMT	Hannant 30', (yellow card) 74'; Ashley (yellow card) 70'; Fevrier (yellow card) 90+2'	Report	Khan (yellow card) 76'; MacDonald (yellow card) 84'	Stadium: JobServe Community Stadium; Attendance: 3,599; Referee: Carl Brook

7 January 2023 25	Harrogate Town	1–3	Colchester United	Harrogate
15:00 GMT	Ramsay (yellow card) 7'; Thomson (yellow card) 60'; Armstrong 77'	Report	Akinde 12'; Chilvers 17', (yellow card) 50'; Chambers (yellow card) 45+5'; Tchamadeu 54'; Smith (yellow card) 90'	Stadium: The EnviroVent Stadium; Attendance: 2,144; Referee: Darren Handley

14 January 2023 26	Rochdale	1–2	Colchester United	Spotland
15:00 GMT	Rodney 36'; White (yellow card) 63'; Diagouraga (yellow card) 90+4'	Report	Tchamadeu 26'; Jay (yellow card) 67'; Skuse 87'	Stadium: Crown Oil Arena; Attendance: 2,360; Referee: Martin Coy

21 January 2023 27	Colchester United	0–2	Gillingham	Colchester
15:00 GMT	Akinde (yellow card) 61'	Report	Williams (yellow card) 27'; Tutonda 36', (yellow card) 68'; Nichols 45+3'	Stadium: JobServe Community Stadium; Attendance: 5,435; Referee: Alan Young

24 January 2023 28	Colchester United	1–1	Salford City	Colchester
19:45 GMT	Kelleher 63'	Report	McAleny 49'	Stadium: JobServe Community Stadium; Attendance: 2,748; Referee: Paul Howard

28 January 2023 29	Hartlepool United	1–2	Colchester United	Hartlepool
15:00	Pruti (yellow card) 13'; Featherstone (yellow card) 79'; Sterry 82'	Report	Kelleher 5'; Sterry 87' (o.g.); Tchamadeu (yellow card) 90+1'	Stadium: The Suit Direct Stadium; Attendance: 4,105; Referee: Simon Mather

4 February 2023 30	Colchester United	1–1	Barrow	Colchester
15:00 GMT	Akinde (penalty missed) 66', (yellow card) 90+3'; Ashley (yellow card) 75'; Hopper (yellow card) 76'; Appiah 90+6'	Report	Feely (yellow card) 46'; Whitfield 57'; Farman (yellow card) 66'; Garner (yellow card) 73'; Foley (yellow card) 74'	Stadium: JobServe Community Stadium; Attendance: 3,203; Referee: Ben Speedie

11 February 2023 31	Grimsby Town	0–1	Colchester United	Cleethorpes
15:00 GMT	Waterfall (yellow card) 45'	Report	Hopper 32'; Wood (yellow card) 45+4'; O'Hara (yellow card) 78'	Stadium: Blundell Park; Attendance: 6,462; Referee: David Rock

14 February 2023 32	Colchester United	0–0	Walsall	Colchester
19:45 GMT	Tchamadeu (yellow card) 58'; Tovide (yellow card) 84'	Report	Daniels (yellow card) 62'	Stadium: JobServe Community Stadium; Attendance: 2,577; Referee: Sam Allison

18 February 2023 33	Carlisle United	1–0	Colchester United	Carlisle
15:00 GMT	McCalmont 4'	Report		Stadium: Brunton Park; Attendance: 5,550 (148 away); Referee: Neil Hair

25 February 2023 34	Colchester United	0–1	Northampton Town	Colchester
15:00 GMT	Kelleher (yellow card) 20'; Read (yellow card) 81'; Tovide (yellow card) 84'	Report	Leonard (yellow card) 30'; Magloire (yellow card) 35'; McGowan (yellow card) 38'; Appéré 41'; Hoskins (yellow card) 73'; King (yellow card) 90+3'	Stadium: JobServe Community Stadium; Attendance: 3,730; Referee: Sunny Gill

5 March 2023 35	Bradford City	2–0	Colchester United	Bradford
15:00 GMT	Walker (yellow card) 44'; Halliday (yellow card) 71'; Ridehalgh (yellow card) 90+2'; Cook 90+3'; Banks 90+6'	Report	Read (yellow card) 90+2'	Stadium: University of Bradford Stadium; Attendance: 20,383 (345 away); Referee: Tom Reeves

11 March 2023 36	Colchester United	0–1	Stockport County	Colchester
15:00 GMT	Kelleher (yellow card) 47'; Huws (yellow card) 78'	Report	Wootton 37'; Olaofe (yellow card) 87'; Johnson (yellow card) 89'	Stadium: JobServe Community Stadium; Attendance: 3,530 (473 away); Referee: Declan Bourne

18 March 2023 37	Leyton Orient	2–2	Colchester United	Leyton
15:00 GMT	Moncur 33' (pen.); Turns (yellow card) 50'; Sotiriou 68'; Vigouroux (yellow card) 78'; Drinan (yellow card) 90+5'	Report	Hopper (yellow card) 17'; Tchamadeu (yellow card) 32'; Hall 89'; Chilvers 90+2'	Stadium: Brisbane Road; Attendance: 8,684; Referee: Ross Joyce

25 March 2023 38	Colchester United	1–1	Tranmere Rovers	Colchester
15:00 GMT	Tovide (yellow card) 51'; Newby (yellow card) 59'; Chilvers 65' (pen.); Tchamadeu (yellow card) 76'; Read (yellow card) 86'; Kelleher (yellow card) 90'	Report	Saunders 13', (yellow card) 89'; Mumbongo (yellow card) 39'; Davies (yellow card) 56'; Hendry (yellow card) 59'; Dacres-Cogley (yellow card) 64'; Murphy (yellow card) 64'; Turnbull (yellow card) 70'; Bristow (yellow card) 75'	Stadium: JobServe Community Stadium; Attendance: 3,420; Referee: Carl Boyeson

1 April 2023 39	Colchester United	0–0	Newport County	Colchester
15:00 BST	Tchamadeu (yellow card) 37'; Tovide (yellow card) 42'	Report	McNeill (yellow card) 26'; Moriah-Welsh (yellow card) 88'	Stadium: JobServe Community Stadium; Attendance: 3,086 (174 away); Referee: Martin Woods

7 April 2023 40	Stevenage	1–1	Colchester United	Stevenage
15:00 BST	Gilbey 47'; Vancooten (yellow card) 80'; James-Wildin (yellow card) 83'	Report	Read (yellow card) 10'; Hall 18'; Chambers (yellow card) 90+8'	Stadium: The Lamex Stadium; Attendance: 4,763 (624 away); Referee: James Oldham

10 April 2023 41	Colchester United	4–0	Crewe Alexandra	Colchester
15:00 BST	Akinde 24', 28'; Kelleher (yellow card) 30'; Chilvers 40'; Tovide 55'	Report	Tabiner (yellow card) 10'; Adebisi (yellow card) 39'	Stadium: JobServe Community Stadium; Attendance: 4,158 (188 away); Referee: Will Finnie

15 April 2023 42	Salford City	0–1	Colchester United	Kersal
15:00 BST	McAleny (yellow card) 45'; Vassell (yellow card) 62'; Hendry (yellow card) 90+4'	Report	Chilvers 22'; Tovide (yellow card) 56'; Ashley (yellow card) 63'; Hall (yellow card) 85'	Stadium: The Peninsula Stadium; Attendance: 2,333 (223 away); Referee: Andy Haines

18 April 2023 43	Crawley Town	0–0	Colchester United	Crawley
19:45 BST		Report		Stadium: Broadfield Stadium; Attendance: 2,894 (445 away); Referee: James Bell

22 April 2023 44	Colchester United	4–1	Sutton United	Colchester
15:00 BST	Chambers 19'; Akinde 26'; Tchamadeu 41'; Chilvers 63'	Report	Ajiboye 11'; Boldewijn (yellow card) 66'	Stadium: JobServe Community Stadium; Attendance: 3,851 (275 away); Referee: Carl Brook

29 April 2023 45	Doncaster Rovers	1–0	Colchester United	Doncaster
15:00 BST	Rowe 30'; Williams (yellow card) 35'	Report	Chilvers (yellow card) 35'; Akinde (yellow card) 45+2'; Tchamadeu (yellow card) 90+6'; Ben Garner (yellow card) off the pitch'	Stadium: Eco-Power Stadium; Attendance: 5,928 (413 away); Referee: Sunny Gill

8 May 2023 46	Colchester United	0–2	Mansfield Town	Colchester
12:30 BST		Report	Harbottle 45+2'; Gale 90+7'	Stadium: Colchester Community Stadium; Attendance: 6,910; Referee: Ben Speedie

=== FA Cup ===
The U's were drawn away to Newport County in the first round.

Win Draw Loss Fixtures

5 November 2022 First round	Newport County	2–0	Colchester United	Newport
15:00 GMT	O'Hara 28' (o.g.); Waite (yellow card) 31'; Lewis 76'	Report	Clampin (yellow card) 55'	Stadium: Rodney Parade; Attendance: 2,377; Referee: Bobby Madden

=== EFL Cup ===
Win Draw Loss Fixtures

Colchester were drawn away to Ipswich Town in the first round and at home to Brentford in the second round.

9 August 2022 First round	Ipswich Town	0–1	Colchester United	Ipswich
19:45 BST	Woolfenden (yellow card) 90+5'	Report	Hannant 29', (yellow card) 77'; Skuse (yellow card) 38'; Ashley (yellow card) 57'; Tchamadeu (yellow card) 77'	Stadium: Portman Road; Attendance: 11,654; Referee: Sam Purkiss

23 August 2022 Second round	Colchester United	0–2	Brentford	Colchester
19:45 BST	Dallison (yellow card) 46'; Kazeem (yellow card) 58'	Report	Onyeka (yellow card) 32'; Lewis-Potter 39'; Sørensen 90+1'	Stadium: JobServe Community Stadium; Attendance: 5,516; Referee: James Linington

=== EFL Trophy ===
On 21 June, the initial group stage draw was made, grouping Colchester United with Charlton Athletic and Gillingham. Three days later, Brighton & Hove Albion U21s joined Southern Group A. In the second round, Colchester were drawn at home to Bristol Rovers.

Pos	Div	Team	Pld	W	PW	PL	L	GF	GA	GD	Pts	Qualification
1	L2	Colchester United	3	2	0	1	0	5	3	+2	7	Advance to Round 2
2	L1	Charlton Athletic	3	2	0	0	1	6	3	+3	6	Advance to Round 2
3	L2	Gillingham	3	1	1	0	1	4	6	−2	5	
4	ACA	Brighton & Hove Albion U21	3	0	0	0	3	4	7	−3	0	

Source: EFL.com

Win Draw Loss Fixtures

6 September 2022 Group stage	Colchester United	2–1	Brighton & Hove Albion U21s	Colchester
19:45 BST	Nouble 80'; Sears 87'	Report	Moran 43', (yellow card) 61'	Stadium: JobServe Community Stadium; Attendance: 479; Referee: Alan Young

4 October 2022 Group stage	Colchester United	2–1	Charlton Athletic	Colchester
19:45 BST	Lubala (yellow card) 55'; Chilvers (yellow card) 63'; Eastman 86'; Akinde 90+1'	Report	Morgan 17' (yellow card) 21'; Clare (yellow card) 45+1'; Payne (penalty missed) 76'	Stadium: JobServe Community Stadium; Attendance: 880; Referee: Lee Swabey

11 October 2022 Group stage	Gillingham	1–1 (5–4 p)	Colchester United	Gillingham
19:45 BST	Baggott (yellow card) 16'; Walker 43' (yellow card) 65'; Kashket (yellow card) 60'; Jefferies (yellow card) 77'	Report	Lubala (yellow card) 23'; Akinde 45'	Stadium: MEMS Priestfield Stadium; Attendance: 828; Referee: Sam Allison
	Penalties
	Walker (penalty scored); Adelakun (penalty scored); Wright (penalty scored); Kashket (penalty scored); Chambers (penalty missed); Green (penalty scored)		Longstaff (penalty scored); Nouble (penalty missed); Newby (penalty scored); Tchamadeu (penalty scored); Chilvers (penalty scored); Marshall-Miranda (penalty missed)

22 November 2022 Second round	Colchester United	1–2	Bristol Rovers	Colchester
19:00 GMT	Sears 83'	Report	Connolly 53'; Saunders 90+5'	Stadium: JobServe Community Stadium; Attendance: 669; Referee: Thomas Kirk

== See also ==
- List of Colchester United F.C. seasons
