= Arthur Read (footballer, born 1999) =

English association football player

Personal information
- Full name: Arthur James Read
- Date of birth: 3 November 1999 (age 26)
- Place of birth: Camden, England
- Height: 5 ft 10 in (1.78 m)
- Position: Midfielder

Team information
- Current team: York City
- Number: 16

Youth career
- –2016: Luton Town

Senior career*
Years	Team	Apps	(Gls)
2016–2019	Luton Town	0	(0)
2019	→ Hemel Hempstead Town (loan)	4	(0)
2019–2021	Brentford	0	(0)
2020–2021	→ Stevenage (loan)	31	(2)
2021–2023	Stevenage	30	(1)
2023–2026	Colchester United	145	(13)
2026–	York City	6	(0)
- * Club domestic league appearances and goals as of 12 September 2026 (UTC)

Arthur James Read (born 3 November 1999) is an English professional footballer who plays as a midfielder for EFL League Two club York City. He is a product of the Luton Town academy.

== Career ==
=== Luton Town ===
A midfielder, Read began his career with Luton Town at under-9 level. He progressed through the club's academy to the under-18 team and was awarded a scholarship in February 2016. He made his first-team debut as a 90th-minute substitute for Jake Gray in a 3–1 home defeat to Millwall in an EFL Trophy group stage match on 8 November 2016, and signed a three-year professional contract with the club two weeks later. Read continued to play predominantly for the club's development and under-18 teams, with whom he won the Bedfordshire Premier Cup in 2016 and the Youth Alliance Cup in 2018. During the next two seasons, he made six further EFL Trophy appearances, and was loaned out to National League South club Hemel Hempstead Town for one month, where he made five appearances. Read rejected the offer of a new development contract in the summer of 2019 and departed Kenilworth Road having made seven appearances and scored one goal.

=== Brentford ===
Read joined Championship club Brentford on 12 July 2019 to play in their B team, signing a one-year contract with the option of a further year, for a compensation fee. Having made 30 appearances and scored five goals in his first season with the B team, Brentford exercised the option to extend Read's contract in July 2020. He spent the entire 2020–21 season away on loan and departed when his contract expired.

=== Stevenage ===
On 10 September 2020, Read joined League Two club Stevenage on loan until the end of the 2020–21 season. He made 38 appearances, scored two goals and joined the club on a permanent contract at the end of the season.

=== Colchester United ===
On 3 January 2023, Read signed a two-and-a-half-year contract with League Two side Colchester United.

=== York City ===
On 26 June 2026, Read joined newly-promoted York City.

== Career statistics ==
As of 27 February 2025

Appearances and goals by club, season and competition
Club	Season	League			FA Cup		EFL Cup		Other		Total	
Club	Season	Division	Apps	Goals	Apps	Goals	Apps	Goals	Apps	Goals	Apps	Goals
Luton Town	2016–17	League Two	0	0	0	0	0	0	1 (Note: Appearance(s) in EFL Trophy)	0	1	0
Luton Town	2017–18	League Two	0	0	0	0	0	0	2	0	2	0
Luton Town	2018–19	League One	0	0	0	0	0	0	4	1	4	1
Luton Town	Total		0	0	0	0	0	0	7	1	7	1
Hemel Hempstead Town (loan)	2018–19	National League South	4	0	—		—		1 (Note: Appearance in Herts Charity Cup)	0	5	0
Brentford	2019–20	Championship	0	0	0	0	0	0	—		0	0
Brentford	2020–21	Championship	—		—		0	0	—		0	0
Brentford	Total		0	0	0	0	0	0	—		5	0
Stevenage (loan)	2020–21	League Two	32	2	3	0	—		3	0	38	2
Stevenage	2021–22	League Two	19	1	2	0	1	0	3	0	25	1
Stevenage	2022–23	League Two	11	0	1	0	3	0	5	1	20	1
Stevenage	Total		62	3	6	0	4	0	11	1	83	4
Colchester United	2022–23	League Two	20	0	0	0	0	0	0	0	20	0
Colchester United	2023–24	League Two	41	5	1	0	1	0	3	0	46	5
Colchester United	2024–25	League Two	39	1	1	0	2	0	5	0	47	1
Colchester United	2025-26	League Two	40	5	1	0	1	0	4	1	46	6
Total			140	11	3	0	4	0	12	1	159	12
Career total			206	14	9	0	8	0	31	3	251	17

== Honours ==
Individual

- Colchester United Player of the Year: 2023–24
- Colchester United Players' Player of the Year: 2023–24
