= Fiacre Kelleher =

Irish footballer (born 1996)

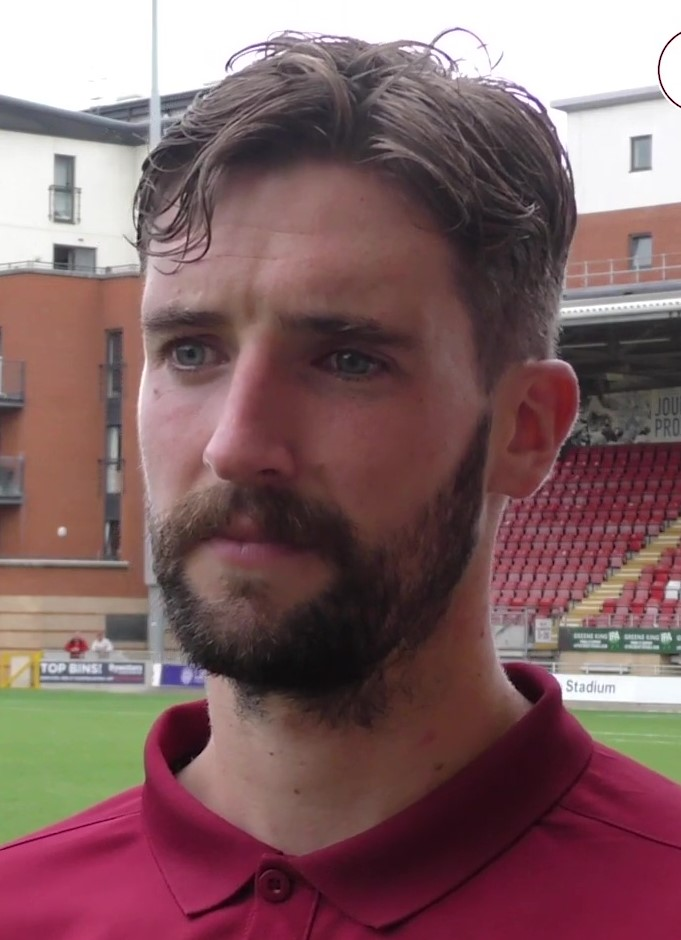
- Kelleher playing for Bradford City in 2021

Personal information
- Full name: Fiacre Blane Kelleher
- Date of birth: 10 March 1996 (age 30)
- Place of birth: Cork, Ireland
- Height: 1.90 m (6 ft 3 in)
- Position: Central defender

Team information
- Current team: Cork City
- Number: 4

Youth career
- Avondale
- 2012–2016: Celtic

Senior career*
Years	Team	Apps	(Gls)
2016–2017	Celtic	0	(0)
2016–2017	→ Peterhead (loan)	19	(3)
2017–2019	Oxford United	0	(0)
2017–2018	→ Solihull Moors (loan)	38	(2)
2018–2019	→ Macclesfield Town (loan)	42	(1)
2019–2020	Macclesfield Town	36	(1)
2020–2021	Wrexham	42	(1)
2021–2023	Bradford City	9	(0)
2022–2023	→ Solihull Moors (loan)	18	(1)
2023–2025	Colchester United	59	(5)
2025–	Cork City	41	(1)
- * Club domestic league appearances and goals as of 16:27, 10 November 2026 (UTC)

Fiacre Blane Kelleher (born 10 March 1996) is an Irish professional footballer who plays as a defender for League of Ireland Premier Division club Cork City.

== Early and personal life ==
Born in Cork, Kelleher is from Blackrock. He has three older brothers who played hurling, as did he. He is the older brother of goalkeeper Caoimhín Kelleher.

== Club career ==
=== Early career ===
Kelleher began his career with local Cork club Avondale, before signing for Scottish club Celtic in 2012. He moved on loan to Peterhead in July 2016.

He signed for English club Oxford United in June 2017. He moved on loan to Solihull Moors in August 2017, extending the deal in January 2018 until the end of the season.

=== Macclesfield Town ===
He joined Macclesfield Town on loan in June 2018. Kelleher made his professional debut on the first day of the 2018–19 season, starting the game against Swindon Town. He scored his first goal for club in an EFL Cup draw with Bradford City in August, and his first league goal in a 3–3 draw with Newport County at the beginning of October. After being released by Oxford at the end of the season, he returned to Macclesfield and was named captain of the side for the 2019–20 season.

=== Wrexham ===
On 12 September 2020, Kelleher signed for National League side Wrexham.

Kelleher was released by Wrexham on 2 June 2021.

=== Bradford City ===
On 29 June 2021 it was announced that he had signed a two-year contract with Bradford City. He later said that he was "excited" to train with his new teammates. He entered the starting line-up after an injury to captain Niall Canavan, later saying that the club's dip in form was not enjoyable.

In April 2022 he said was "gobsmacked" that the club had hired Mark Hughes as manager.

He moved on loan to Solihull Moors in July 2022, for the entire season. He was recalled by Bradford City in January 2023, with a view to making a permanent transfer elsewhere.

=== Colchester United ===
The next day, he signed for Colchester United for an undisclosed fee. He had said that his time at Bradford had "not worked out", having made 11 appearances for the club. After signing for Colchester he became "in the heart of the defence".

=== Cork City ===
On 12 June 2025, Kelleher returned to his hometown, signing for League of Ireland Premier Division club Cork City on a long-term contract set to commence from 1 July. On 9 November 2025, he captained the side in the 2025 FAI Cup final as they were beaten 2–0 by Shamrock Rovers at the Aviva Stadium. He made a total of 12 appearances in all competitions by the end of the 2025 season, as the club were relegated to the League of Ireland First Division after finishing bottom of the league.

== International career ==
Kelleher has represented Ireland at under-19 level.

== Career statistics ==
As of match played 16 October 2026

Appearances and goals by club, season and competition
Club	Season	League			National Cup		League Cup		Other		Total	
Club	Season	Division	Apps	Goals	Apps	Goals	Apps	Goals	Apps	Goals	Apps	Goals
Celtic	2016–17	Scottish Premiership	0	0	0	0	0	0	0	0	0	0
Peterhead (loan)	2016–17	Scottish League One	19	3	1	0	3	0	2 (Note: Appearances in Scottish Challenge Cup)	0	25	3
Oxford United	2017–18	League One	0	0	0	0	0	0	0	0	0	0
Oxford United	2018–19	League One	0	0	0	0	0	0	0	0	0	0
Oxford United	Total		19	3	1	0	3	0	2	0	25	3
Solihull Moors (loan)	2017–18	National League	38	2	2	0	0	0	2 (Note: Appearances in FA Trophy)	0	42	2
Macclesfield Town (loan)	2018–19	League Two	42	1	1	0	3	1	2 (Note: Appearance(s) in EFL Trophy)	0	48	2
Macclesfield Town	2019–20	League Two	36	1	0	0	2	0	1	0	39	1
Wrexham	2020–21	National League	42	1	1	0	–		0	0	43	1
Bradford City	2021–22	League Two	9	0	1	0	0	0	2	0	12	0
Bradford City	2022–23	League Two	0	0	0	0	0	0	0	0	0	0
Bradford City	Total		9	0	1	0	0	0	2	0	12	0
Solihull Moors (loan)	2022–23	National League	18	1	2	0	0	0	0	0	20	1
Colchester United	2022–23	League Two	20	2	0	0	0	0	0	0	20	2
Colchester United	2023–24	League Two	11	1	0	0	0	0	2	0	13	1
Colchester United	2024–25	League Two	28	2	0	0	1	0	3	1	32	3
Colchester United	Total		59	5	0	0	1	0	5	1	65	6
Cork City	2025	LOI Premier Division	9	0	3	0	–		–		12	0
Cork City	2026	LOI First Division	32	1	1	0	–		0	0	33	1
Cork City	Total		41	1	4	0	–		0	0	45	1
Career total			304	15	12	0	9	1	14	1	339	17
