= Jayden Fevrier =

English footballer (born 2003)

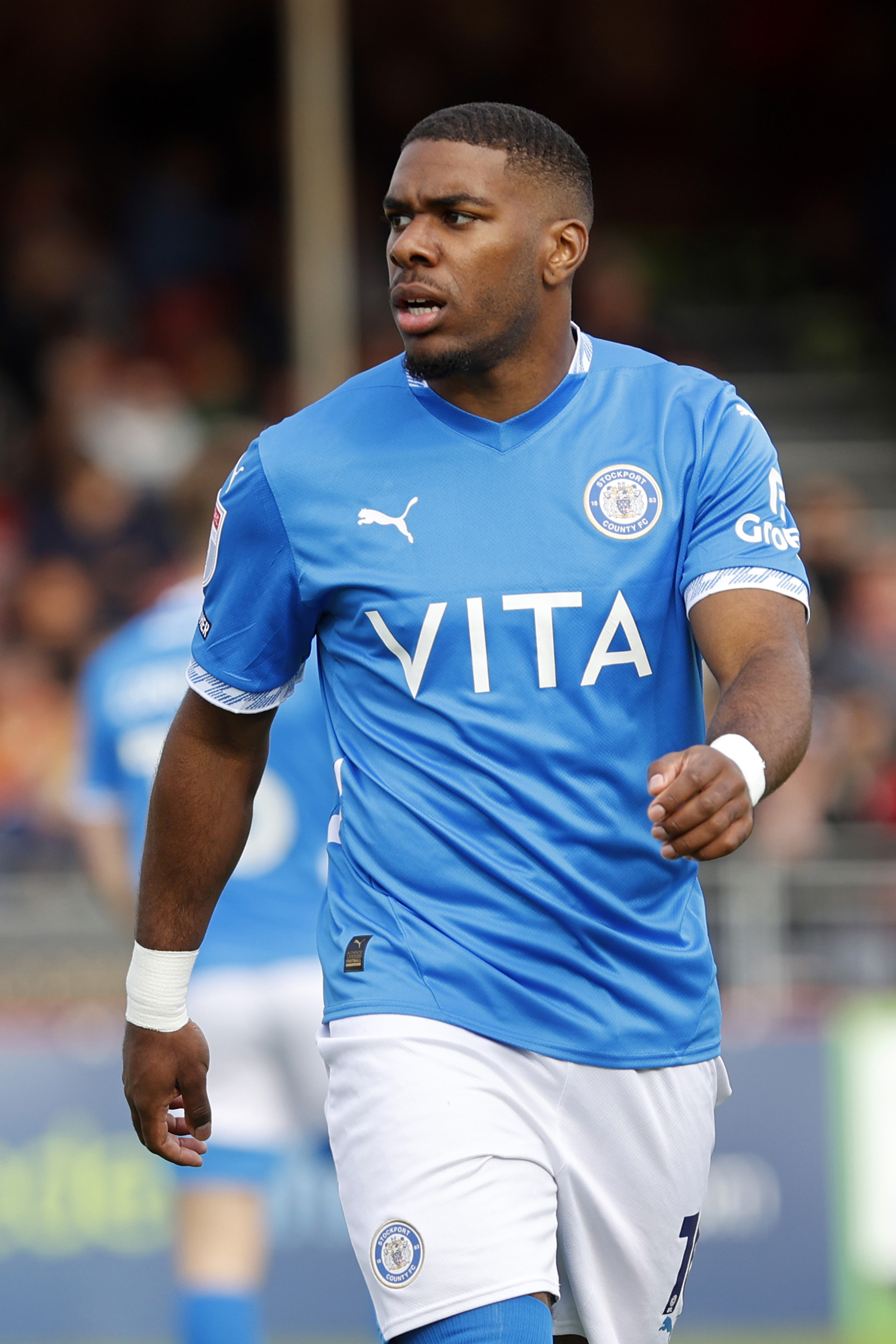
- Fevrier with Stockport County in 2024

Personal information
- Full name: Jayden Raymond Fevrier
- Date of birth: 14 April 2003 (age 23)
- Place of birth: Chadwell Heath, England
- Height: 1.76 m (5 ft 9 in)
- Positions: Right winger; right wing-back

Team information
- Current team: Blackburn Rovers
- Number: 11

Youth career
- 2009–2021: West Ham United

Senior career*
Years	Team	Apps	(Gls)
2021–2022	West Ham United	0	(0)
2022–2024	Colchester United	56	(4)
2024–2026	Stockport County	46	(5)
2026	→ Charlton Athletic (loan)	11	(2)
2026–	Blackburn Rovers	12	(0)

International career
2017–2018	England U15	3	(0)
- * Club domestic league appearances and goals as of 16:04, 24 October 2026 (UTC)

Jayden Raymond Fevrier (born 14 April 2003) is an English professional footballer who plays as a right winger or right wing-back for EFL Championship club Blackburn Rovers.

He previously played in multiple positions for Colchester United, including left wing-back, right wing-back and more advanced on both flanks.

== Club career ==
=== West Ham United ===
Fevrier joined West Ham United at the age of six. At the age of 14, Fevrier made his debut for West Ham's under-18 side. In October 2018, at the age of 15 years, six months and 12 days, Fevrier became the youngest ever player to represent West Ham's reserves, playing against Leicester City. On 30 June 2021, Fevrier signed his first professional contract with West Ham.

=== Colchester United ===
On 5 October 2022, following his release from West Ham, Fevrier signed for EFL League Two side Colchester United. On 29 December 2022, Fevrier made his debut for Colchester, coming on as a late substitute in a 2–1 loss against AFC Wimbledon. On 7 September 2023, he signed a new two-year contract with the club. He scored his first goal for the club on 30 September 2023, in a 5–4 win against Notts County.

=== Stockport County ===
On 4 June 2024, Fevrier signed for League One side Stockport County on a three-year deal for an undisclosed fee. He made his debut for the club on 10 August 2024, in a 2–0 win against Cambridge United. He scored his first goal for the club on 17 August 2024, in a 3–0 win against Blackpool.

==== Charlton Athletic (loan) ====
On 28 January 2026, Fevrier joined Championship side Charlton Athletic on loan for the remainder of the season. He made his debut for the club on 31 January 2026, in a 2–0 win against Leicester City. He scored his first goal for the club on 17 February 2026, in a 3–1 defeat to Portsmouth.

Fevrier scored his second goal for Charlton Athletic, scoring in the 68th minute, in a 2–1 win against Hull City to secure status in the Championship in the 2026–27 season.

=== Blackburn Rovers ===
On 28 July 2026, Fevrier signed for Blackburn Rovers ahead of the 2026–27 season for an undisclosed fee. Fevrier made his debut in the first round of the EFL Cup in a 2–1 win over Burton Albion at Pirelli Stadium, scoring the winning goal with a shot from outside the box in the 88th minute.

== International career ==
Fevrier has represented England at youth level.

== Career statistics ==
As of match played 24 October 2026

Appearances and goals by club, season and competition
Club	Season	League			FA Cup		League Cup		Other		Total	
Club	Season	Division	Apps	Goals	Apps	Goals	Apps	Goals	Apps	Goals	Apps	Goals
West Ham United	2021–22	Premier League	0	0	0	0	0	0	0	0	0	0
Colchester United	2022–23	League Two	12	0	0	0	0	0	0	0	12	0
Colchester United	2023–24	League Two	44	4	1	0	1	0	2 (Note: Appearances in EFL Trophy)	0	48	4
Colchester United	Total		56	4	1	0	1	0	2	0	60	4
Stockport County	2024–25	League One	25	3	2	0	1	0	5 (Note: Three appearances and one goal in the EFL Trophy, two appearances in the EFL League One play-offs)	1	33	4
Stockport County	2025–26	League One	21	2	2	0	2	0	3	0	28	2
Stockport County	Total		46	5	4	0	3	0	8	1	61	6
Charlton Athletic (loan)	2025–26	Championship	11	2	—		—		—		11	2
Blackburn Rovers	2026–27	Championship	12	0	0	0	2	1	—		14	1
Career total			125	11	5	0	6	1	10	1	146	13

== Honours ==
Individual

- West Ham United Dylan Tombides Award: 2020–21
- Colchester United Young Player of the Year: 2023–24
