= Marley Marshall-Miranda =

English footballer (born 2002)

Personal information
- Full name: Marley Zane Marshall Miranda
- Date of birth: 22 October 2002 (age 24)
- Place of birth: Madrid, Spain
- Height: 5 ft 9 in (1.75 m)
- Position: Midfielder

Team information
- Current team: Boreham Wood
- Number: 21

Youth career
- –2019: Brighton & Hove Albion
- 2019–2020: Colchester United

Senior career*
Years	Team	Apps	(Gls)
2019–2024	Colchester United	20	(1)
2019–2020	→ Worthing (loan)	5	(1)
2024–2025	Braintree Town	51	(2)
2025–	Boreham Wood	0	(0)
- * Club domestic league appearances and goals as of 14:32, 19 December 2025 (UTC)

Marley Zane Marshall-Miranda (born 22 October 2002) is an English professional footballer who plays as a central defensive midfielder for National League side Boreham Wood.

== Career ==
Marshall-Miranda joined Colchester United from Brighton & Hove Albion in 2019. He had appeared for Brighton's under-18 side during the 2018–19 Under-18 Premier League season.

After joining Colchester, Marshall-Miranda was sent out on loan to Isthmian League Premier Division side Worthing in December 2019. His loan was extended for a further month in January 2020, before being recalled on 30 January. He scored one goal in six appearances for the club.

Marshall-Miranda made his professional debut for Colchester on 5 September 2020, coming on as a second-half substitute for Ben Stevenson in a 3–1 EFL Cup defeat to Reading.

On 21 December 2020, Marshall-Miranda signed a new contract to keep him with Colchester until summer 2023.

On 8 May 2024, the club announced he would leave in the summer once his contract expired.

On 12 June 2024 following his release from Colchester United, Marshall-Miranda secured a permanent move to fellow Essex outfit Braintree Town ahead of the newly promoted side's upcoming National League campaign.

On 17 December 2025, he joined fellow National League club Boreham Wood.

== Career statistics ==
As of 29 March 2025

Appearances and goals by club, season and competition
Club	Season	League			FA Cup		League Cup		Other		Total	
Club	Season	Division	Apps	Goals	Apps	Goals	Apps	Goals	Apps	Goals	Apps	Goals
Colchester United	2019–20	League Two	0	0	0	0	0	0	0	0	0	0
Colchester United	2020–21	League Two	1	0	0	0	1	0	3 (Note: Appearances in EFL Trophy)	0	5	0
Colchester United	2021–22	League Two	0	0	0	0	0	0	0	0	0	0
Colchester United	2022–23	League Two	17	1	1	0	2	0	2	0	22	1
Colchester United	2023–24	League Two	2	0	0	0	0	0	0	0	2	0
Colchester United	Total		20	1	1	0	3	0	5	0	29	1
Worthing (loan)	2019–20	Isthmian League Premier Division	5	1	0	0	–		1 (Note: Appearance in Sussex Senior Challenge Cup)	0	6	1
Braintree Town	2024–25	National League	28	1	0	0	–		4 (Note: Three appearances in National League Cup, one in FA Trophy)	0	32	1
Career total			53	3	1	0	3	0	10	0	67	3

== Personal life ==
Marshall-Miranda is of English and Angolan descent, holding dual British and Angolan citizenship.
