= Tom Dallison =

English footballer

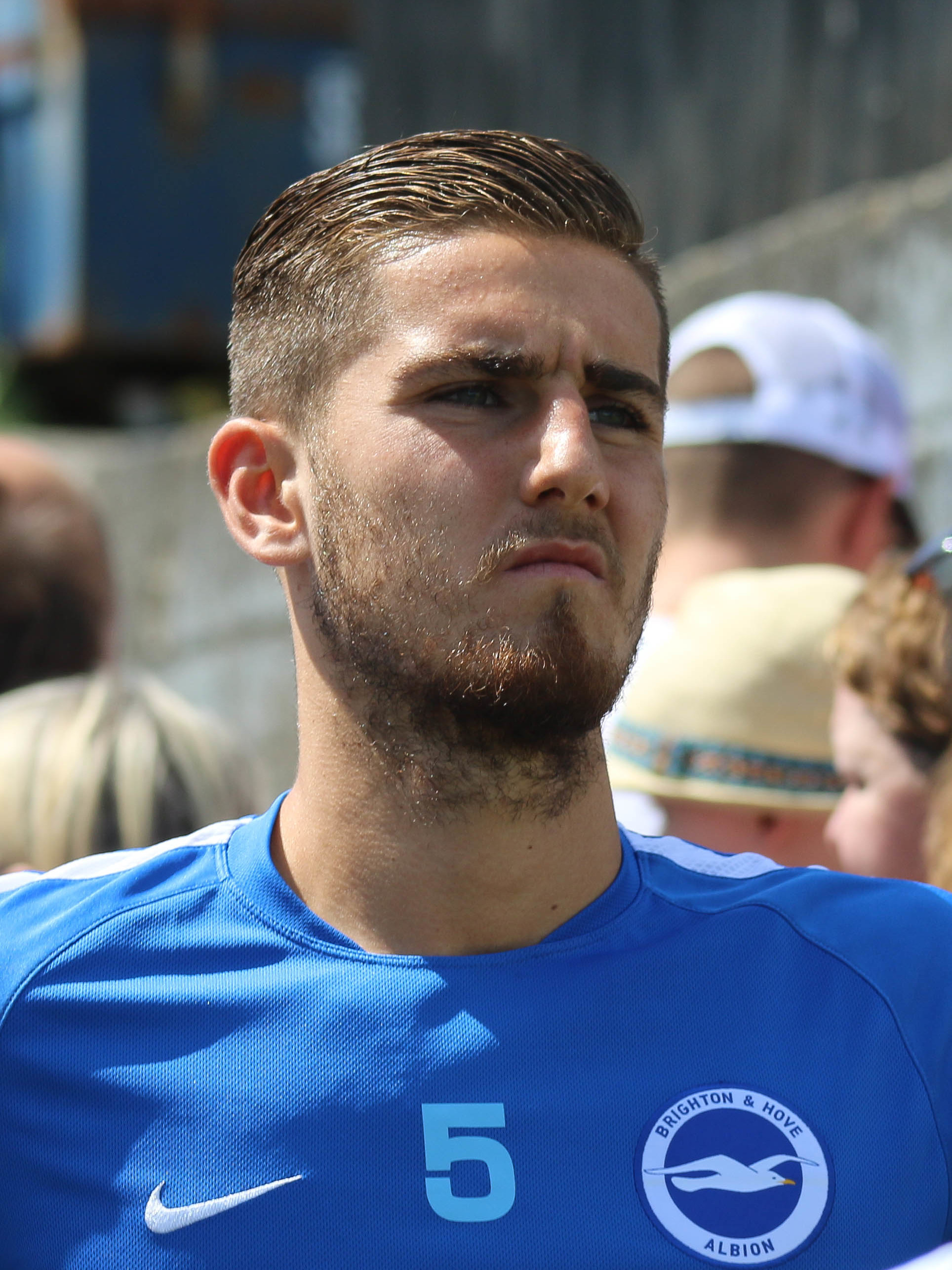
- Dallison in 2015

Personal information
- Full name: Thomas Albert Dallison-Lisbon
- Date of birth: 2 February 1996 (age 30)
- Place of birth: Dagenham, England
- Height: 6 ft 4 in (1.92 m)
- Position: Centre-back

Team information
- Current team: Hornchurch
- Number: 6

Youth career
- 2010–2012: West Ham United
- 2012–2013: Arsenal
- 2013–2015: Brighton & Hove Albion

Senior career*
Years	Team	Apps	(Gls)
2013–2018	Brighton & Hove Albion	0	(0)
2015	→ Dartford (loan)	12	(0)
2015–2016	→ Braintree Town (loan)	4	(0)
2016	→ Crawley Town (loan)	1	(0)
2016–2017	→ Cambridge United (loan)	5	(0)
2017–2018	→ Accrington Stanley (loan)	2	(0)
2018–2019	Falkirk	12	(0)
2019–2022	Crawley Town	66	(2)
2022–2024	Colchester United	58	(2)
2024–2026	Ebbsfleet United	57	(2)
2026–	Hornchurch	9	(0)
- * Club domestic league appearances and goals as of 21:18, 8 November 2026 (UTC)

Thomas Albert Dallison-Lisbon (born 2 February 1996) is an English footballer who plays as a central defender for Hornchurch.

== Early life ==
Dallison was born on 2 February 1996 in Dagenham.

== Career ==
=== Brighton & Hove Albion ===
Dallison began his career playing the youth teams at West Ham United and Arsenal before signing a contract with Brighton & Hove Albion in October 2013 following a successful trial.

On 13 February 2015, Dallison joined Football Conference club Dartford on a month-long loan. After five appearances for the club, the loan was extended to the end of the season on 17 March, and he made 12 appearances in total across his loan spell.

On 18 August 2015, he joined Braintree Town on loan. He made 4 appearances for the club, the last of them coming in a 2–1 home defeat to Aldershot Town on 31 August.

In February 2016 he joined League Two side Crawley Town on loan. He made his professional debut on 20 February 2016 in a 1–1 draw against Plymouth Argyle, but broke his toe after 60 minutes, ruling him out for the rest of the season.

On 18 July 2016, Dallison joined League Two club Cambridge United on a loan deal lasting until 8 January 2017.

In August 2017 he joined Accrington Stanley on loan, He scored his first goal for Accrington in an EFL Cup tie against West Bromwich Albion on 22 August 2017, and in January 2018 he returned to Brighton.

=== Falkirk ===
In May 2018, Dallison signed a pre-contract agreement with Scottish Championship club Falkirk.

=== Crawley Town ===
He signed for Crawley Town in January 2019. Manager Gabriele Cioffi praised Dallison in March 2019, hailing him as a quick learner, and he made 19 appearances for the club before the end of the season. In January 2020, Dallison extended his contract with Crawley until the end of the 2021–22 season.

=== Colchester United ===
On 6 January 2022, Dallison signed a two-and-a-half-year contract with Colchester United for an undisclosed fee.

On 8 May 2024, the club announced he would be released in the summer when his contract expired.

=== Ebbsfleet United ===
Dallison joined National League club Ebbsfleet United in July 2024.

== Career statistics ==
As of match played 8 March 2025

Appearances and goals by club, season and competition
Club	Season	League			National cup		League cup		Other		Total	
Club	Season	Division	Apps	Goals	Apps	Goals	Apps	Goals	Apps	Goals	Apps	Goals
Brighton and Hove Albion	2014–15	Championship	0	0	0	0	0	0	0	0	0	0
Dartford (loan)	2014–15	Conference Premier	12	0	0	0	—		0	0	12	0
Braintree Town (loan)	2015–16	National League	4	0	0	0	—		0	0	4	0
Crawley Town (loan)	2015–16	League Two	1	0	0	0	0	0	0	0	1	0
Cambridge United (loan)	2016–17	League Two	5	0	0	0	1	0	3 (Note: Appearances in the EFL Trophy)	0	9	0
Accrington Stanley (loan)	2017–18	League Two	2	0	0	0	2	1	2	0	6	1
Falkirk	2018–19	Scottish Championship	12	0	1	0	3	0	1 (Note: Appearances in the Scottish Challenge Cup)	0	17	0
Crawley Town	2018–19	League Two	19	0	0	0	0	0	0	0	19	0
Crawley Town	2019–20	League Two	21	0	2	0	4	1	3	0	30	1
Crawley Town	2020–21	League Two	14	2	3	0	1	0	2	0	20	2
Crawley Town	2021–22	League Two	12	0	1	0	1	0	3	0	17	0
Crawley Town	Total		66	2	6	0	6	1	8	0	86	3
Colchester United	2021–22	League Two	9	1	0	0	0	0	0	0	9	1
Colchester United	2022–23	League Two	22	0	0	0	1	0	2	0	25	0
Colchester United	2023–24	League Two	27	1	1	0	1	0	1	0	30	1
Colchester United	Total		58	2	1	0	2	0	3	0	64	2
Ebbsfleet United	2024–25	National League	30	0	1	0	0	0	4 (Note: One appearance in the FA Trophy and three appearances in the National League Cup)	0	35	0
Career total			190	4	9	0	14	2	21	0	229	6
