= Chay Cooper =

English footballer (born 2001)

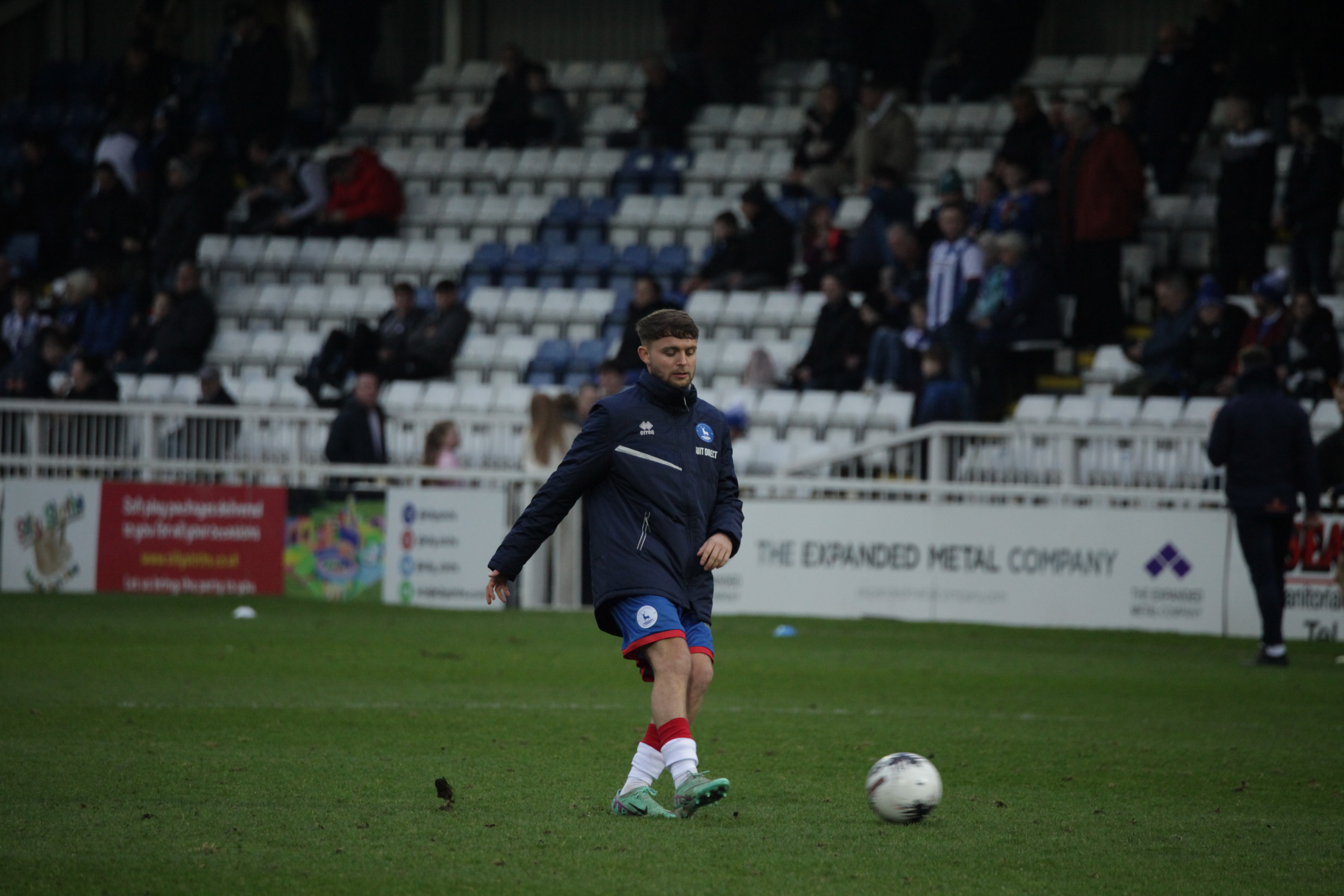
- Chay Cooper warming up for Hartlepool United

Personal information
- Full name: Chay Cooper
- Date of birth: 17 November 2001 (age 24)
- Place of birth: Harlow, England
- Position: Midfielder

Team information
- Current team: Chelmsford City
- Number: 8

Youth career
- 2011–2016: Southend United
- 2016–2021: Tottenham Hotspur
- 2020–2021: → Southend United (loan)

Senior career*
Years	Team	Apps	(Gls)
2021–2024	Colchester United	12	(3)
2023	→ St Albans City (loan)	22	(6)
2024	→ Hartlepool United (loan)	9	(0)
2024–2026	Braintree Town	81	(6)
2026–	Chelmsford City	0	(0)
- * Club domestic league appearances and goals as of 00:32, 26 April 2026 (UTC)

Chay Cooper (born 17 November 2001) is an English professional footballer who plays as a midfielder for National League South side Chelmsford City.

== Career ==
Cooper began playing for Southend United at the age of 10. Towards the end of the 2016–17 season, he joined Tottenham Hotspur from Southend as a scholar. He was loaned back to Southend to play in their Under-23 team to get some game time in October 2020.

At the end of the 2020–21 season, Cooper was released by Tottenham. After featuring in a number of pre-season friendlies for Colchester United's Under-23 side, he signed a deal with the club on 3 September 2021.

On 28 September 2021, Cooper made his first-team debut for Colchester, starting in their 1–0 EFL Trophy victory against West Ham United Under-21s. In Cooper's Football League debut, he came off the bench to score the second goal away at Hartlepool United which Colchester won 2–0. On 2 February 2023, Cooper joined National League South club St Albans City on loan until the end of the season. His goal in a match against Harrogate Town was voted as Colchester's Goal of the Season for the 2023–24 season.

On 16 February 2024, Cooper signed for National League club Hartlepool United on loan.

In June 2024, Cooper turned down a new contract at Colchester and opted to sign for newly promoted National League side Braintree Town instead.

On 1 June 2026, Cooper signed for National League South club Chelmsford City.

== Career statistics ==
As of match played 25 April 2026

Appearances and goals by club, season and competition
Club	Season	League			FA Cup		League Cup		Other		Total	
Club	Season	Division	Apps	Goals	Apps	Goals	Apps	Goals	Apps	Goals	Apps	Goals
Colchester United	2021–22	League Two	1	1	2	0	0	0	2 (Note: Appearances in EFL Trophy)	0	5	1
Colchester United	2022–23	League Two	1	0	0	0	0	0	0	0	1	0
Colchester United	2023–24	League Two	10	2	1	0	0	0	4	1	15	3
Colchester United	Total		12	3	3	0	0	0	6	1	21	4
St Albans City (loan)	2022–23	National League South	22	6	0	0	—		0	0	22	6
Hartlepool United (loan)	2023–24	National League	9	0	0	0	—		0	0	9	0
Braintree Town	2024–25	National League	43	4	1	0	—		5 (Note: Appearances in National League Cup)	2	49	6
Braintree Town	2025–26	National League	38	2	2	1	—		6 (Note: Five appearances and two goals in National League Cup, one appearance in FA Trophy)	2	46	5
Braintree Town	Total		81	6	3	1	—		11	4	95	11
Career total			124	15	6	1	0	0	17	5	147	21
