= Tom Smith (footballer, born 2002) =

English footballer (born 2002)

Personal information
- Full name: Thomas Andrew Salvatore Smith
- Date of birth: 30 January 2002 (age 24)
- Position: Goalkeeper

Team information
- Current team: Colchester United
- Number: 1

Youth career
- Arsenal

Senior career*
Years	Team	Apps	(Gls)
2020–2023	Arsenal	0	(0)
2020	→ Dover Athletic (loan)	3	(0)
2021	→ Welling United (loan)	2	(0)
2022	→ Bromley (loan)	13	(0)
2023	→ Colchester United (loan)	6	(0)
2023–	Colchester United	6	(0)
- * Club domestic league appearances and goals as of 12:35, 14 December 2025 (UTC)

Thomas Andrew Salvatore Smith (born 30 January 2002) is an English professional footballer who plays for EFL League Two club Colchester United as a goalkeeper.

== Career ==
Smith began his career with Arsenal, and spent time on loan at non-league clubs Dover Athletic, Welling United and Bromley, before moving on loan to Colchester United in January 2023, as a backup to first choice goalkeeper Kieran O'Hara. He made his professional debut on 10 April 2023, and kept clean sheets in his first three games.

He was released by Arsenal at the end of the 2022–23 season. He returned to Colchester on a permanent two-year contract on 31 July 2023. He signed a new contract with Colchester in July 2026.
