= 2026–27 Luton Town F.C. season =

Luton Town
2026–27 season
- Owner: Luton Town Football Club 2020 Ltd
- Chairman: David Wilkinson
- Manager: Jack Wilshere
- Stadium: Kenilworth Road
- EFL League One: TBD
- FA Cup: TBD
- EFL Cup: Second round (Knocked out by Chelsea)
- EFL Trophy: TBD
- Top goalscorer: League: Nahki Wells (9); All: Nahki Wells (11)
- Highest home attendance: 11,693 v Leicester City (24 Oct 2026, League One)
- Lowest home attendance: 2,005 v Ipswich Town U21 (22 Sep 2026, EFL Trophy)
- Biggest win: 6–0 v Ipswich Town U21 (Home, 22 Sep 2026, EFL Trophy)
- Biggest defeat: 5–2 v Mansfield Town (Away, 30 Aug 2026, League One)
Home colours	Away colours	Third colours

The 2026–27 season is the 141st season in the history of Luton Town Football Club and their second consecutive season being in League One. In addition to the domestic league, the club also participate in the FA Cup, the EFL Cup, and the EFL Trophy.

== Transfers and contracts ==
=== In ===
Date	Pos.	No.	Player	From	Fee	Ref.
First Team
1 July 2026 (Note: The transfer was announced on 9 June, and would become official on July 1 once Johnston's contract at Bolton Wanderers expired.)	CB	6	(Scotland) George Johnston	(England) Bolton Wanderers	Free	
4 July 2026	CAM	45	(Jamaica) Kasey Palmer	(England) Hull City	£500,000	
30 July 2026	CF	9	(Northern Ireland) Callum Marshall	(England) West Ham United	Undisclosed	
Academy
10 August 2026	CB	–	(England) Dempsy Crace	(England) Cambridge United	Free (Note: Professional development contract)	
10 August 2026	LB	–	(England) Louie Henry	(England) Stevenage	Free	
13 October 2026	GK	–	(England) Jake Hopper	(England) Hull City	Free	
20 October 2026	GK	–	(England) Ben Nightingale	(England) Dagenham & Redbridge	Free	

=== Loans in ===
Date	Pos.	No.	Player	From	Until	Ref.
9 July 2026	RB	33	(Scotland) Harrison Ashby	(England) Newcastle United	End of Season	
14 August 2026	LW	11	(Scotland) Emilio Lawrence	(England) Manchester City	End of Season	
29 August 2026	CAM	10	(Northern Ireland) Jamie Donley	(England) Tottenham Hotspur	End of Season	
31 August 2026	CM	16	(England) Dan Gore	(England) Manchester United	End of season (Note: Includes a conditional option to buy)	
1 September 2026	RW	17	(England) Tudor Mendel	(England) Ipswich Town	1 January 2027	

=== Loans out ===
Date	Pos.	No.	Player	To	Until	Ref.
First Team
8 July 2026	CF	–	(England) Oli Lynch	(England) Port Vale	End of Season	
11 July 2026	LW	–	(England) Ethon Archer	(England) Bromley	End of Season	
13 July 2026	CF	–	(England) Joe Gbodé	(England) Shrewsbury Town	End of Season	
26 August 2026	CF	–	(England) Jerry Yates	(England) Blackpool	End of Season	
4 September 2026	CF	–	(Norway) Lasse Nordås	(Poland) Cracovia	End of season (Note: Includes an option to buy)	
25 September 2026	CB	42	(Spain) Christian Chigozie	(England) Hemel Hempstead Town	5 November 2026 (Note: On 5 November, Chigozie's loan until January was terminated early.)	
Academy
16 July 2026	GK	–	(England) Lucas Thomas	(England) Farnborough	30 October 2026 (Note: On 30 October, Thomas' loan was terminated two months early.)	
1 August 2026	CF	–	(England) Jamie Odegah	(England) Oxford City	1 September 2026	
1 August 2026	CF	–	(England) Taylan Harris	(England) Woking	End of season	
7 August 2026	CF	–	(England) Tate Xavier-Jones	(England) Spalding United	4 September 2026	
4 September 2026	CM	–	(Northern Ireland) Dylan Stitt	(England) Hitchin Town	1 November 2026 (Note: On 7 October, Stitt's loan at Hitchin Town was extended for another month)	
18 September 2026	CF	–	(England) Tate Xavier-Jones	(England) Farnborough	16 November 2026 (Note: On 16 October, Xavier-Jones' initial one-month loan at Farnborough was extended for a further month.)	
6 October 2026	CF	–	(England) Jamie Odegah	(England) Slough Town	1 November 2026 (Note: On 1 November, Odegah's loan until January was terminated.)	
16 October 2026	RB	36	(Cyprus) Zach Ioannides	(England) Folkestone Invicta	1 January 2027 (Note: On 13 November, Ioannides' initial one-month loan was extended until January.)	
16 October 2p2	CM	48	(England) Jack Lorentzen-Jones	(England) Brackley Town	1 January 2027	
20 October 2026	GK	–	(England) Ben Nightingale	(England) Leighton Town	20 January 2027	
30 October 2026	GK	41	(England) Lucas Thomas	(England) Havant & Waterlooville	End of season	
3 November 2026	CM	–	(Northern Ireland) Dylan Stitt	(England) Dorking Wanderers	1 December 2026	
7 November 2026	CF	–	(England) Jamie Odegah	(England) Chelmsford City	End of season	

=== Out ===
Date	Pos.	No.	Player	To	Fee	Ref.
First Team
10 July 2026	CF	–	(England) Cauley Woodrow	(England) Wycombe Wanderers	Undisclosed	
15 July 2026	CB	–	(Republic of the Congo) Christ Makosso	(France) AJ Auxerre	£2,000,000	
26 July 2026	LW	–	(Republic of Ireland) Millenic Alli	(England) Charlton Athletic	Undisclosed	
27 August 2026	CM	23	(Northern Ireland) George Saville	(England) Bromley	Undisclosed	

=== Released / Out of contract ===
Date	Pos.	No.	Player	Subsequent club	Joined date	Ref.
First Team
30 June 2026	CAM	37	(England) Zack Nelson	(England) AFC Wimbledon	1 July 2026	
30 June 2026	CF	19	(Scotland) Jacob Brown	(England) Reading	2 July 2026	
30 June 2026	LB	33	(England) Cohen Bramall	(England) Milton Keynes Dons	3 July 2026	
30 June 2026	CF	11	(England) Elijah Adebayo	(England) Bristol City	25 August 2026	
1 September 2026	CB	–	(England) Tom Holmes			
Academy
30 June 2026	GK	–	(Australia) Henry Blackledge	(United States) Virginia Tech Hokies	1 August 2026	
30 June 2026	LB	–	(England) Kai Source	(England) St Ives Town	13 August 2026	
30 June 2026	CB	45	(Italy) Vladimir Paternoster	(England) Braintree Town	15 August 2026	
30 June 2026	CF	39	(England) Josh Phillips	(England) Sholing	9 October 2026	
30 June 2026	GK	–	(England) Liam Coyne			
30 June 2026	CF	–	(Nigeria) Jordan Iwhiwhu			
30 June 2026	CM	–	(Rwanda) Claude Kayibanda			

=== New contract ===
Date	Pos.	No.	Player	Contract expiry	Ref.
First Team
21 May 2026	CB	42	(Spain) Christian Chigozie	Undisclosed	
3 June 2026	CM	18	(England) Jordan Clark	Undisclosed	
5 June 2026	CM	8	(England) Liam Walsh	Undisclosed	
15 July 2026	LB	22	(England) Harry Fox	Undisclosed (Note: First professional contract)	
11 August 2026	LW	31	(England) Benny Benagr	Undisclosed	
5 October 2026	CAM	19	(England) Jayden Luker	Undisclosed	
Academy
8 May 2026	LW	31	(England) Benny Benagr	30 June 2027 (Note: Professional development contract)	
8 May 2026	RB	36	(Cyprus) Zach Ioannides	30 June 2027	
8 May 2026	CM	–	(Albania) Alvin Isufi	30 June 2027	
8 May 2026	CM	48	(England) Jack Lorentzen-Jones	30 June 2027	
8 May 2026	CF	–	(England) Jamie Odegah	30 June 2027	
8 May 2026	CM	–	(England) Charlie Trustram	30 June 2027	
8 May 2026	CF	–	(England) Tate Xavier-Jones	30 June 2027	
10 August 2026	GK	–	(England) Charlie Booth	30 June 2027	
10 August 2026	CF	–	(Colombia) Samuel Hincapie-Alfonso	30 June 2027	
10 August 2026	RB	–	(England) Kyron Roberts-Edema	30 June 2027	
10 August 2026	CAM	–	(England) Archie Shepherd	30 June 2027	
13 October 2026	CM	–	(England) Garry Gibbs	30 June 2027	

== Pre-season and friendlies ==
On 7 May, Luton announced they would return to training at The Brache on July 2 with their first friendly to be against Hitchin Town nine-days later. A day later, the club confirmed a pre-season training camp in Murcia between 19 and 26 July. A home fixture against Eredivisie side Go Ahead Eagles was also added. On 27 May, a third opposition was confirmed, versus Barnet. On 4 June, the opposition for their match in Murcia was confirmed to be Saudi Pro League side Al-Kholood. Another fixture to be played behind-closed-doors against League Two side Walsall was announced on 28 July.

Win Draw Loss Fixtures

11 July 2026 Friendly	Hitchin Town	0–5	Luton Town	Hitchin
13:00 BST		Report	Clark 12', 31'; Wells 50'; Palmer 63'; Chigozie 90+1'	Stadium: Top Field; Attendance: 2,066
Note: Testimonial match for former Hitchin player and manager Mark Burke.

18 July 2026 Friendly	Barnet	2–2	Luton Town	Edgware
13:00 BST	Ofoborh 5'; Tshimanga 76'	Report	Wells 43'; Luker 72'	Stadium: The Hive Stadium

25 July 2026 Friendly	Al-Kholood	0–2	Luton Town	San Pedro del Pinatar, Spain
11:00 CEST		Report	Walsh 40'; Andersen 83'	Stadium: Pinatar Arena

29 July 2026 Friendly	Luton Town	5–0	Walsall	Luton
	Cole 16'; Benagr 21'; Luker 22'; Morris 56'; Wells	Report		Stadium: The Brache; Attendance: 0 (behind closed doors)

1 August 2026 Friendly	Luton Town	4–1	Go Ahead Eagles B	Luton
	Luker; Morris; Saville; Wells	Report	Flataker	Stadium: The Brache; Attendance: 0 (behind closed doors)

2 August 2026 Friendly	Luton Town	0–1	Go Ahead Eagles	Luton
13:00 BST		Report	Sigurdarson 22'	Stadium: Kenilworth Road; Attendance: 5,800 (inc. 920 Go Ahead Eagles fans)

== Competitions ==
=== Overall record ===
Competition	First match	Last match	Starting round	Final position	Record							
Competition	First match	Last match	Starting round	Final position	Pld	W	D	L	GF	GA	GD	Win %
EFL League One	15 August 2026	8 May 2027	Matchday 1	TBD	15	8	3	4	29	22	+7	53.33
FA Cup	7 November 2026	TBD	First round	TBD	1	1	0	0	2	0	+2	100.00
EFL Cup	8 August 2026	27 August 2026	First round	Second round	2	1	0	1	3	2	+1	50.00
EFL Trophy	22 September 2026	TBD	Group stage	TBD	3	2	1	0	10	1	+9	66.67
Total					21	12	4	5	44	25	+19	57.14

Last updated: 21 November 2026
Source: Soccerway

=== EFL League One ===
==== League table ====
Pos	Team	Pld	W	D	L	GF	GA	GD	Pts	Promotion, qualification or relegation
2	Huddersfield Town	15	8	5	2	28	13	+15	29	Promotion to EFL Championship
3	Oxford United	14	8	5	1	26	14	+12	29	Qualification for League One play-offs
4	Luton Town	15	8	3	4	29	22	+7	27	Qualification for League One play-offs
5	Sheffield Wednesday	15	7	5	3	27	15	+12	26	Qualification for League One play-offs
6	Bradford City	14	6	5	3	12	10	+2	23	Qualification for League One play-offs

Updated to match(es) played on 21 November 2026. Source: EFL Official Website
Rules for classification: 1) Points; 2) Goal difference; 3) Number of goals scored; 4) Head-to-head results; 5) Wins; 6) Away goals; 7) Penalty points (sec 9.5); 8) 12-point sending off offences

==== Results summary ====
Overall								Home						Away					
Pld	W	D	L	GF	GA	GD	Pts	W	D	L	GF	GA	GD	W	D	L	GF	GA	GD
15	8	3	4	29	22	+7	27	4	2	1	12	7	+5	4	1	3	17	15	+2

Last updated: 21 November 2026.
Source: Soccerway

==== Results by round ====
Round	1	2	3	4	5	6	7	10	11	12	13	9^{2}	14	8^{1}	16	17	18	19	20	21	22	23	24	25	26	27	28	15^{3}
Ground	A	H	A	H	H	A	H	A	A	H	H	H	A	A	A	H	A	H	A	H	A	A	H	H	A	A	H	H
Result	W	D	L	W	D	L	L	W	L	W	W	W	W	D	W													
Position	4	3	13	7	7	12	16	13	16	13	10	8	4	3	4													
Points	3	4	4	7	8	8	8	11	11	14	17	20	23	24	27													

Source: EFL
A = Away; H = Home; W = Win; D = Draw; L = Loss; P = Postponed
Notes:
- ^{1} Matchday 8 (vs. Huddersfield Town) was postponed due to international call-ups.
- ^{2} Matchday 9 (vs. Doncaster Rovers) was postponed due to international call-ups.
- ^{3} Matchday 15 (vs. Cambridge United) was postponed due to international call-ups.

==== Matches ====
On 25 June, the League One fixtures were revealed.

Win Draw Loss Fixtures

15 August 2026 1	Reading	3–4	Luton Town	Reading
12:30 BST	Marriott 8', 31', 38'; O'Connor (yellow card) 90+5'	Report	Richards 6'; Palmer 50', 52'; Walsh (yellow card) 72'; Kodua 90+6' (yellow card) 90+7'	Stadium: Select Car Leasing Stadium; Attendance: 14,065; Referee: Leigh Doughty

22 August 2026 2	Luton Town	2–2	Notts County	Luton
12:30 BST	Johnston (yellow card) 32'; Wells 42' (pen.) (yellow card) 56'; Naismith (yellow card) 45'; Palmer (yellow card) 47'; Marshall 68'; Walsh (yellow card) 90+3'	Report	Smyth (yellow card) 31'; Robertson (yellow card) 39'; Roberts 45+1'; Cooper 61'; Mustapha (yellow card) 90+3'	Stadium: Kenilworth Road; Attendance: 11,515; Referee: Ben Speedie
Note: Fixture was initially scheduled for a 15:00 kick-off, but was brought forward for live Sky Sports coverage.

30 August 2026 3	Mansfield Town	5–2	Luton Town	Mansfield
15:00 BST	Reed (yellow card) 8' (goal) 45'; Moriah-Welsh 17', 28'; Sweeney (yellow card) 45+2'; Russell 47', 56'; Reed 45'; Knoyle (yellow card) 77'; Hendry (yellow card) 90+4'	Report	Jones (yellow card) 26'; Kodua (yellow card) 64'; Wells 78' (pen.), 90+2'	Stadium: One Call Stadium; Attendance: 8,754; Referee: Richard Eley
Note: Fixture was initially scheduled for 29 August, but was moved back 24 hours due to EFL Cup fixtures.

2 September 2026 4	Luton Town	2–0	Stockport County	Luton
19:45 BST	Wells 50'; Gore (yellow card) 56'; Marshall 76'	Report	Norwood (yellow card) 68'	Stadium: Kenilworth Road; Attendance: 10,013; Referee: Craig Hicks
Note: Fixture was initially scheduled for 1 September, but was moved back 24 hours due to EFL Cup fixtures.

5 September 2026 5	Luton Town	1–1	Leyton Orient	Luton
15:00 BST	Donley 25'; Johnston (yellow card) 57'; Gore (yellow card) 86'	Report	Kabia 34' (yellow card) 42'; Olowu (yellow card) 53'; Akhamrich (yellow card) 57'; Hayden (yellow card) 73'	Stadium: Kenilworth Road; Attendance: 11,307; Referee: Ollie Yates

10 September 2026 6	Stevenage	2–1	Luton Town	Stevenage
20:00 BST	Phillips (yellow card) 4'; Kemp 23' (yellow card) 44'; Freestone (yellow card) 26'; Magennis 70'; Earley (yellow card) 80'; James-Wildin (yellow card) 90+3'	Report	Walsh (yellow card) 30'; Andersen 75' (yellow card) 90+5'	Stadium: SPORTA Arena; Attendance: 5,406; Referee: Andrew Humphries
Note: Fixture was initially scheduled for 12 September, but was rescheduled for live Sky Sports coverage.

19 September 2026 7	Luton Town	0–1	Bradford City	Luton
15:00 BST	Gore (yellow card) 60'; Ashby (yellow card) 83' (yellow-red card) 90+5'	Report	Pointon 4'; Connolly (yellow card) 46'; Sarcevic (yellow card) 67'; Morgan (yellow card) 72'; Gillesphey (yellow card) 90+4'	Stadium: Kenilworth Road; Attendance: 11,647; Referee: Ross Martin

10 October 2026 10	Wycombe Wanderers	1–4	Luton Town	High Wycombe
15:00 BST	Grimmer 90+5'	Report	Palmer 16'; Donley 27'; Naismith (yellow card) 40'; Wells 46'; Walsh (yellow card) 76'; Cole 84'	Stadium: Adams Park; Attendance: 6,488; Referee: Scott Oldham

17 October 2026 11	Milton Keynes Dons	2–1	Luton Town	Milton Keynes
12:30 BST	Gilbey 25' (yellow card) 64'; Wintle (yellow card) 57'; Collins 79' (pen.)	Report	Clark 70'	Stadium: Stadium MK; Attendance: 16,377; Referee: Martin Coy
Note: Fixture was initially scheduled for a 15:00 kick-off, but was brought forward for live Sky Sports broadcasting.

20 October 2026 12	Luton Town	2–1	Barnsley	Luton
19:45 BST	Andersen 2' (yellow card) 45+1'; Wells 41'; Richards (yellow card) 75'	Report	Kirk 58'; Richards (yellow card) 90'	Stadium: Kenilworth Road; Attendance: 9,840; Referee: Carl Brook

24 October 2026 13	Luton Town	2–1	Leicester City	Luton
12:30 BST	Wells 39'; Marshall 90+4'	Report	Lundstram (yellow card) 68' (yellow-red card) 85'; Cullen 90'; Burns (yellow card) 90+3'	Stadium: Kenilworth Road; Attendance: 11,693; Referee: Martin Woods
Note: Fixture was initially scheduled for a 15:00 kick-off, but was brought forward for live Sky Sports broadcasting.

27 October 2026 9	Luton Town	3–1	Doncaster Rovers	Luton
19:45 GMT	Donley (yellow card) 30', (goal) 52', 72'; Marshall 44' (pen.)	Report	Sterry (yellow card) 11'; Bailey (yellow card) 60'; McCann 84'; Thomas (yellow card) 90+3'	Stadium: Kenilworth Road; Attendance: 9,707; Referee: Matthew Russell
Note: Fixture was originally scheduled for 3 October, but was postponed due to international call-ups.

31 October 2026 14	Peterborough United	0–2	Luton Town	Peterborough
15:00 GMT	Ashfield (yellow card) 9'	Report	Clark 3'; Donley (yellow card) 43'; Kelly 46' (o.g.); Palmer (yellow card) 76'	Stadium: Weston Homes Stadium; Attendance: 8,814; Referee: Lewis Sandoe

3 November 2026 8	Huddersfield Town	1–1	Luton Town	Huddersfield
19:45 GMT	Taylor 49'	Report	Palmer (yellow card) 35'; Clark 40'	Stadium: Accu Stadium; Attendance: 15,906; Referee: Matt Donohue
Note: Fixture was originally scheduled for 26 September, but was postponed due to international call-ups.

21 November 2026 16	Burton Albion	1–2	Luton Town	Burton upon Trent
15:00 GMT	Adiele 20'; Krubally (yellow card) 56'; Sraha (yellow card) 90+7'	Report	Wells 31' (pen.), 76', (yellow card) 78'	Stadium: Pirelli Stadium; Attendance: 4,222; Referee: Dean Whitestone

28 November 2026 17	Luton Town	v	Oxford United	Luton
15:00 GMT				Stadium: Kenilworth Road

1 December 2026 18	Blackpool	v	Luton Town	Blackpool
19:45 GMT				Stadium: Bloomfield Road

12 December 2026 19	Luton Town	v	Wigan Athletic	Luton
15:00 GMT				Stadium: Kenilworth Road

19 December 2026 20	Sheffield Wednesday	v	Luton Town	Owlerton
12:30 GMT				Stadium: Hillsborough Stadium
Note: Fixture was initially scheduled for a 15:00 kick-off, but was brought forward for live Sky Sports broadcasting.

26 December 2026 21	Luton Town	v	Bromley	Luton
15:00 GMT				Stadium: Kenilworth Road

29 December 2026 22	AFC Wimbledon	v	Luton Town	Wimbledon
19:45 GMT				Stadium: The Cherry Red Records Stadium

2 January 2027 23	Plymouth Argyle	v	Luton Town	Plymouth
15:00 GMT				Stadium: Home Park
Note: Fixture was initially scheduled for 1 January, but was pushed back 24 hours.

9 January 2027 24	Luton Town	v	Sheffield Wednesday	Luton
15:00 GMT				Stadium: Kenilworth Road

16 January 2027 25	Luton Town	v	Milton Keynes Dons	Luton
12:30 GMT				Stadium: Kenilworth Road
Note: Fixture was initially scheduled for a 15:00 kick-off, but was brought forward for live Sky Sports broadcasting.

19 January 2027 26	Barnsley	v	Luton Town	Barnsley
19:45 GMT				Stadium: Oakwell

23 January 2027 27	Leicester City	v	Luton Town	Leicester
15:00 GMT				Stadium: King Power Stadium

30 January 2027 28	Luton Town	v	Peterborough United	Luton
12:30 GMT				Stadium: Kenilworth Road
Note: Fixture was initially scheduled for a 15:00 kick-off, but was brought forward for live Sky Sports broadcasting.

2 February 2026 15	Luton Town	v	Cambridge United	Luton
19:45 GMT				Stadium: Kenilworth Road
Note: Fixture was originally scheduled for 14 November, but was postponed due to international call-ups.

6 February 2027 29	Luton Town	v	Mansfield Town	Luton
15:00 GMT				Stadium: Kenilworth Road

9 February 2027 30	Stockport County	v	Luton Town	Stockport
19:45 GMT				Stadium: Edgeley Park

13 February 2027 31	Leyton Orient	v	Luton Town	Leyton
15:00 GMT				Stadium: BetWright Stadium

20 February 2027 32	Luton Town	v	Stevenage	Luton
15:00 GMT				Stadium: Kenilworth Road

27 February 2027 33	Oxford United	v	Luton Town	Oxford
12:30 GMT				Stadium: Kassam Stadium
Note: Fixture was initially scheduled for a 15:00 kick-off, but was brought forward for live Sky Sports broadcasting.

6 March 2027 34	Luton Town	v	Reading	Luton
15:00 GMT				Stadium: Kenilworth Road

13 March 2027 35	Notts County	v	Luton Town	Nottingham
15:00 GMT				Stadium: Meadow Lane

20 March 2027 36	Luton Town	v	Burton Albion	Luton
15:00 GMT				Stadium: Kenilworth Road

26 March 2027 37	Luton Town	v	Plymouth Argyle	Luton
15:00 GMT				Stadium: Kenilworth Road

29 March 2027 38	Wigan Athletic	v	Luton Town	Wigan
15:00 BST				Stadium: Brick Community Stadium

3 April 2027 39	Luton Town	v	AFC Wimbledon	Luton
15:00 BST				Stadium: Kenilworth Road

10 April 2027 40	Bromley	v	Luton Town	Bromley
15:00 BST				Stadium: Copperjax Community Stadium

13 April 2027 41	Luton Town	v	Huddersfield Town	Luton
19:45 BST				Stadium: Kenilworth Road

17 April 2027 42	Bradford City	v	Luton Town	Bradford
15:00 BST				Stadium: Mbanq Valley Parade

24 April 2027 43	Luton Town	v	Wycombe Wanderers	Luton
15:00 BST				Stadium: Kenilworth Road

27 April 2027 44	Doncaster Rovers	v	Luton Town	Doncaster
19:45 BST				Stadium: Club Doncaster Sports Village

1 May 2027 45	Cambridge United	v	Luton Town	Cambridge
15:00 BST				Stadium: Cledara Abbey Stadium

8 May 2027 46	Luton Town	v	Blackpool	Luton
12:30 BST				Stadium: Kenilworth Road

=== FA Cup ===
Luton were drawn against the winner of the replay between Chesham United and Forest Green Rovers in the first round, with Forest Green Rovers being confirmed as their opponent on 20 October. They were drawn away to National League side AFC Fylde in the second round.

Win Draw Loss Fixtures

7 November 2026 First round	Luton Town	2–0	Forest Green Rovers	Luton
15:00 GMT	Lawrence 4'; Johnston (yellow card) 25'; Clark 41'; Gore (yellow card) 50'	Report	Rydel (yellow card) 14'; Ifeanyi (yellow card) 42'	Stadium: Kenilworth Road; Attendance: 4,325; Referee: Jamie Robinson

6 December 2026 Second round	AFC Fylde	v	Luton Town	Wesham
14:30 GMT				Stadium: Mill Farm Sports Village

=== EFL Cup ===
Luton were drawn away to Gillingham in the first round and to Chelsea in the second round.

Win Draw Loss Fixtures

8 August 2026 First round	Gillingham	0–3	Luton Town	Gillingham
15:00 BST	Albarus (yellow card) 50'	Report	Wells 43'; Benagr 59'; Kodua 78'; Morris (yellow card) 88'	Stadium: Priestfield Stadium; Attendance: 4,015; Referee: Stephen Parkinson

27 August 2026 Second round	Chelsea	2–0	Luton Town	Fulham
19:30 BST	Welbeck 50'; Odoffin 79' (o.g.)	Report	Johnson (yellow card) 56'	Stadium: Stamford Bridge; Attendance: 32,210; Referee: Elliot Bell

=== EFL Trophy ===
==== Group stage ====
Luton were drawn against Peterborough United, Colchester United and Ipswich Town U21 into Southern Group D.

Pos	Div	Team	Pld	W	PW	PL	L	GF	GA	GD	Pts	Qualification
1	L1	Luton Town	3	2	1	0	0	10	1	+9	8	Advance to Round 2
2	L1	Peterborough United	3	2	0	0	1	7	5	+2	6	Advance to Round 2
3	L2	Colchester United	3	0	1	1	1	2	4	−2	3	
4	ACA	Ipswich Town U21	3	0	0	1	2	1	10	−9	1	

Source: EFL

Win Draw Loss Fixtures

22 September 2026 Group stage	Luton Town	6–0	Ipswich Town U21	Luton
19:00 BST	Clark 18', 23', 51'; Cole 34'; Johnson 74'; Gawel 86'	Report	Runham (yellow card) 53'	Stadium: Kenilworth Road; Attendance: 2,005; Referee: Callum Walchester

3 October 2026 Group stage	Colchester United	1–1 (3–4 p)	Luton Town	Colchester
15:00 BST	Perry (yellow card) 56'; Terry (yellow card) 68'; Connolly (yellow card) 76'; Harvey (yellow card) 80'; Ihionvien 90'	Report	Cole 87'	Stadium: JobServe Community Stadium; Attendance: 2,545; Referee: Dale Baines
	Penalties
	Ihionvien (penalty scored); Terry (penalty missed); Digby (penalty scored); Williams (penalty scored); Connolly (penalty missed)		Clark (penalty scored); Gore (penalty missed); Cole (penalty scored); Richards (penalty scored); Andersen (penalty scored)
Note: Fixture was originally scheduled for 6 October, but was moved forward due to international call-ups affecting league games.

17 November 2026 Group stage	Luton Town	3–0	Peterborough United	Luton
19:00 GMT	Richards (yellow card) 10'; Clark 16'; Wells 45+7'; Cole 62'	Report	Feeney (yellow card) 31'; Williams (yellow card) 45+7'; Bass (yellow card) 58'; Jones (yellow card) 67'	Stadium: Kenilworth Road; Attendance: 2,858; Referee: Niall Smith

==== Knockout stages ====
8–9 December 2026 Round of 32	Luton Town	v	TBD	Luton
				Stadium: Kenilworth Road

== Statistics ==
=== Appearances ===
As of match played 21 November 2026

Players with no appearances are not included on the list; italics indicate loaned in player

No.	Pos	Nat	Player	Total		League One		FA Cup		EFL Cup		EFL Trophy	
No.	Pos	Nat	Player	Apps	Goals	Apps	Goals	Apps	Goals	Apps	Goals	Apps	Goals
1	GK	(England) ENG	James Shea	11	0	9	0	0	0	0	0	2	0
2	DF	(England) ENG	Hakeem Odoffin	13	0	9	0	0	0	2	0	1+1	0
3	DF	(Scotland) SCO	Kal Naismith	12	0	9	0	0	0	1	0	2	0
4	MF	(Norway) NOR	Sverre Sandal	1	0	0	0	0	0	0+1	0	0	0
5	DF	(Denmark) DEN	Mads Andersen	18	2	13+1	2	1	0	0	0	2+1	0
6	DF	(Scotland) SCO	George Johnston	20	0	15	0	1	0	2	0	1+1	0
7	MF	(England) ENG	Jake Richards	21	1	8+7	1	1	0	1+1	0	3	0
8	MF	(England) ENG	Liam Walsh	20	0	15	0	0+1	0	2	0	2	0
9	FW	(Northern Ireland) NIR	Callum Marshall	16	4	5+9	4	1	0	1	0	0	0
10	MF	(Northern Ireland) NIR	Jamie Donley	13	4	12+1	4	0	0	0	0	0	0
11	MF	(Scotland) SCO	Emilio Lawrence	16	1	4+7	0	1	1	1	0	1+2	0
12	DF	(England) ENG	Joe Johnson	8	1	2+2	0	1	0	1	0	2	1
14	FW	(England) ENG	Shayden Morris	1	0	0	0	0	0	0+1	0	0	0
15	DF	(England) ENG	Teden Mengi	2	0	1	0	0	0	0	0	0+1	0
16	MF	(England) ENG	Dan Gore	12	0	3+5	0	1	0	0	0	2+1	0
17	MF	(England) ENG	Tudor Mendel	12	0	5+4	0	1	0	0	0	1+1	0
18	MF	(England) ENG	Jordan Clark	15	8	9+1	3	1	1	1	0	3	4
19	MF	(England) ENG	Jayden Luker	1	0	0	0	0	0	1	0	0	0
21	FW	(Bermuda) BER	Nahki Wells	19	11	11+4	9	0+1	0	1+1	1	1	1
22	DF	(England) ENG	Harry Fox	5	0	0+1	0	0	0	0+1	0	1+2	0
24	GK	(Republic of Ireland) IRL	Josh Keeley	10	0	6	0	1	0	2	0	1	0
25	DF	(Guyana) GUY	Isaiah Jones	17	0	10+5	0	0	0	1+1	0	0	0
30	FW	(England) ENG	Gideon Kodua	11	2	2+5	1	0	0	1+1	1	2	0
31	DF	(England) ENG	Benny Benagr	6	1	1+3	0	0	0	2	1	0	0
33	DF	(Scotland) SCO	Harrison Ashby	14	0	3+5	0	1	0	1+1	0	2+1	0
36	MF	(Cyprus) CYP	Zach Ioannides	1	0	0	0	0	0	0	0	1	0
42	DF	(Spain) ESP	Christian Chigozie	1	0	0	0	0+1	0	0	0	0	0
44	FW	(Jamaica) JAM	Devante Cole	7	4	0+2	1	0+1	0	0+1	0	2+1	3
45	MF	(Jamaica) JAM	Kasey Palmer	19	3	13+2	3	0+1	0	1+1	0	1	0
48	MF	(England) ENG	Jack Lorentzen-Jones	1	0	0	0	0	0	0	0	0+1	0
49	FW	(Poland) POL	Dawid Gawel	1	1	0	0	0	0	0	0	0+1	1

=== Goals ===
As of match played 21 November 2026

Rank	Pos.	No.	Player	League One	FA Cup	EFL Cup	EFL Trophy	Total
1	FW	21	(Bermuda) Nahki Wells	9	0	1	1	11
2	MF	18	(England) Jordan Clark	3	1	0	4	8
3	FW	9	(Northern Ireland) Callum Marshall	4	0	0	0	4
3	MF	10	(Northern Ireland) Jamie Donley	4	0	0	0	4
3	FW	44	(Jamaica) Devante Cole	1	0	0	3	4
6	MF	45	(Jamaica) Kasey Palmer	3	0	0	0	3
7	DF	5	(Denmark) Mads Andersen	2	0	0	0	2
7	FW	30	(England) Gideon Kodua	1	0	1	0	2
9	MF	7	(England) Jake Richards	1	0	0	0	1
9	MF	11	(Scotland) Emilio Lawrence	0	1	0	0	1
9	DF	12	(England) Joe Johnson	0	0	0	1	1
9	DF	31	(England) Benny Benagr	0	0	1	0	1
9	FW	49	(Poland) Dawid Gawel	0	0	0	1	1
Total				28	2	3	10	42

=== Clean sheets ===
As of match played 21 November 2026

Rank	No.	Player	League One	FA Cup	EFL Cup	EFL Trophy	Total
1	24	(Republic of Ireland) Josh Keeley	1	1	1	1	4
2	1	(England) James Shea	1	0	0	1	2
Total			2	1	1	2	6

=== Disciplinary record ===
As of match played 21 November 2026

Rank	No.	Pos.	Player	League One			FA Cup			EFL Cup			EFL Trophy			Total		
Rank	No.	Pos.	Player	Yellow card	(yellow card) (yellow-red card)	Red card	Yellow card	(yellow card) (yellow-red card)	Red card	Yellow card	(yellow card) (yellow-red card)	Red card	Yellow card	(yellow card) (yellow-red card)	Red card	Yellow card	(yellow card) (yellow-red card)	Red card
1	8	MF	(England) Liam Walsh	4	0	0	0	0	0	0	0	0	0	0	0	4	0	0
1	16	MF	(England) Dan Gore	3	0	0	1	0	0	0	0	0	0	0	0	4	0	0
3	6	DF	(Scotland) George Johnston	2	0	0	1	0	0	0	0	0	0	0	0	3	0	0
3	45	MF	(Jamaica) Kasey Palmer	3	0	0	0	0	0	0	0	0	0	0	0	3	0	0
5	3	DF	(Scotland) Kal Naismith	2	0	0	0	0	0	0	0	0	0	0	0	2	0	0
5	5	DF	(Denmark) Mads Andersen	2	0	0	0	0	0	0	0	0	0	0	0	2	0	0
5	7	MF	(England) Jake Richards	1	0	0	0	0	0	0	0	0	1	0	0	2	0	0
5	10	MF	(Northern Ireland) Jamie Donley	2	0	0	0	0	0	0	0	0	0	0	0	2	0	0
5	21	FW	(Bermuda) Nahki Wells	2	0	0	0	0	0	0	0	0	0	0	0	2	0	0
5	30	FW	(England) Gideon Kodua	2	0	0	0	0	0	0	0	0	0	0	0	2	0	0
5	33	DF	(Scotland) Harrison Ashby	0	1	0	0	0	0	0	0	0	0	0	0	0	1	0
12	12	DF	(England) Joe Johnson	0	0	0	0	0	0	1	0	0	0	0	0	1	0	0
12	14	FW	(England) Shayden Morris	0	0	0	0	0	0	1	0	0	0	0	0	1	0	0
12	25	DF	(Guyana) Isaiah Jones	1	0	0	0	0	0	0	0	0	0	0	0	1	0	0
Total				24	1	0	2	0	0	2	0	0	1	0	0	29	1	0

== Awards ==
=== Player awards ===
==== EFL League One Goal of the Month ====
Month	Player	Opposition	Result	Ref.
September	(Northern Ireland) Callum Marshall	v. Stockport County	Nominated	

==== PFA Player of the Month ====
Month	Player	Result	Ref.
October	(Northern Ireland) Jamie Donley	Nominated	

=== Manager awards ===
==== EFL League One Manager of the Month ====
Month	Manager	Result	Ref.
October	(England) Jack Wilshere	Nominated	
