= 2026–27 Colchester United F.C. season =

90th season in existence of Colchester United FC

Colchester United
2026–27 season
- Chairman: Robbie Cowling
- Head coach: Danny Cowley
- Stadium: Colchester Community Stadium

The 2026–27 season is the 90th season in the history of Colchester United Football Club and their eleventh consecutive season being in League Two. In addition to the domestic league, the club would also participate in the FA Cup, the EFL Cup, and the EFL Trophy.

== Players ==
=== First-team squad ===
As of 28 September 2026

Note: Flags indicate national team as defined under FIFA eligibility rules; some limited exceptions apply. Players may hold more than one non-FIFA nationality.

No.	Pos.	Nation	Player
1	GK	ENG	Tom Smith
2	DF	ENG	Rob Hunt
3	DF	ENG	Ellis Iandolo
4	MF	ENG	Ben Perry
5	DF	ENG	Jack Tucker (captain)
6	MF	ENG	Paul Digby
7	MF	ENG	Harry Anderson
8	MF	ENG	Teddy Bishop
9	FW	ENG	Bradley Ihionvien (on loan from Peterborough United)
10	MF	ENG	Jack Payne
11	FW	ENG	Leon Chiwome (on loan from Wolverhampton Wanderers)
12	MF	ENG	Moses Sesay (on loan from Southampton)
14	FW	ENG	Kylian Kouassi
15	FW	COD	Beryly Lubala
17	FW	ENG	Jaden Williams

No.	Pos.	Nation	Player
20	DF	ENG	Sean Raggett
21	DF	ENG	Jake Leake
22	GK	FRA	Thimothée Lo-Tutala (on loan from Hull City)
23	MF	NGR	Adrian Akande
24	DF	ENG	Frankie Terry
26	MF	ENG	Jay Williams
27	MF	ENG	Oscar Thorn (on loan from Lincoln City)
30	DF	GRN	Kane Vincent-Young
31	GK	ENG	Oscar Roberts
34	MF	ENG	Kaion Lisbie
39	FW	ENG	Kien Connolly
41	DF	ENG	Max Jolliffe
42	MF	ENG	Milton Oni
44	DF	GHA	Sam Kuffour Jr.
47	MF	ENG	Ronnie Harvey

== Transfers and contracts ==
=== In ===
Date	Pos.	Player	From	Fee	Ref.
1 July 2026	CB	(England) Sean Raggett	(England) Rotherham United	Free	
2 July 2026	LB	(England) Jake Leake	(England) Oldham Athletic	Free	
7 July 2026	CDM	(England) Paul Digby	(Scotland) Dundee	Free	
1 September 2026	CF	(England) Kylian Kouassi	(England) Blackpool	Undisclosed	
1 September 2026	CDM	(England) Jay Williams	(England) Crawley Town	Undisclosed	
25 September 2026	LW	(Democratic Republic of the Congo) Beryly Lubala	(England) Stevenage	Free	

=== Loaned in ===
Date	Pos.	Player	From	Loaned until	Ref.
9 July 2026	CF	(England) Bradley Ihionvien	(England) Peterborough United	End of Season	
31 July 2026	CF	(England) Leon Chiwome	(England) Wolverhampton Wanderers	End of Season	
6 August 2026	GK	(France) Thimothée Lo-Tutala	(England) Hull City	End of Season	
7 August 2026	RW	(England) Oscar Thorn	(England) Lincoln City	End of Season	
21 August 2026	CM	(England) Moses Sesay	(England) Southampton	End of Season	

=== Loaned out ===
Date	Pos.	Player	To	Loaned until	Ref.
12 September 2026	CAM	(England) Freddie Ingram	(England) Dagenham & Redbridge	9 November 2026 (Note: On 9 October, Ingram's initial one-month loan at Dagenham & Redbridge was extended for a further month.)	
23 September 2026	CF	(England) Makise Evans	(England) Walton & Hersham	End of Season (Note: On 23 October, Evans' initial one-month loan at Walton & Hersham was extended until the end of season.)	
23 September 2026	CB	(England) Alfie Newby	(England) Walton & Hersham	21 October 2026	
3 October 2026	CDM	(England) Milton Oni	(England) Wealdstone	31 October 2026	
7 November 2026	CF	(England) Josh Adesanya	(England) Welling United	7 December 2026	
7 November 2026	LW	(England) Donte Frank	(England) Ashford United	7 December 2026	
21 November 2026	CDM	(England) Max Jolliffe	(England) Salisbury	17 January 2027	
21 November 2026	CB	(England) Alfie Newby	(England) Welling United	31 January 2027	

=== Out ===
Date	Pos.	Player	To	Fee	Ref.
22 June 2026	RW	(England) Kyreece Lisbie	(England) Reading	Undisclosed	

=== Released / Out of Contract ===
Date	Pos.	Player	Subsequent club	Joined date	Ref.
30 June 2026	CB	(England) Jack Baldwin	(England) Hornchurch	1 July 2026	
30 June 2026	LW	(England) Owura Edwards	(England) Peterborough United	1 July 2026	
30 June 2026	GK	(England) Matt Macey	(England) Wycombe Wanderers	1 July 2026	
30 June 2026	CM	(England) Arthur Read	(England) York City	1 July 2026	
30 June 2026	LW	(Colombia) Dwayne Campina Do Vale	(United States) UNC Asheville Bulldogs	1 August 2026	
30 June 2026	CF	(England) James Sasere	(United States) Lipscomb Bisons	1 August 2026	
30 June 2026	CF	(England) Samson Tovide	(England) Huddersfield Town	3 September 2026	
30 June 2026	CB	(Northern Ireland) Tom Flanagan	Retired		
30 June 2026	RB	(England) Elkanah Akor			
30 June 2026	GK	(England) Harrison Chamberlain			
30 June 2026	CDM	(England) Dominic Gape			
30 June 2026	LW	(England) John-Kymani Gordon			
30 June 2026	CAM	(England) Kai Martin			

=== New Contract ===
Date	Pos.	Player	Contract until	Ref.
15 May 2026	RW	(England) Harry Anderson	30 June 2027	
15 May 2026	CM	(England) Teddy Bishop	30 June 2027	
15 May 2026	CF	(England) Makise Evans	30 June 2027	
15 May 2026	CB	(Ghana) Samuel Kuffour Jr	30 June 2027	
15 May 2026	RW	(England) Kaion Lisbie	30 June 2027	
15 May 2026	CB	(England) Alfie Newby	30 June 2027	
15 May 2026	CAM	(England) Jack Payne	30 June 2027	
3 July 2026	LB	(England) Ellis Iandolo	Undisclosed	
10 July 2026	RB	(England) Rob Hunt	Undisclosed	
14 July 2026	CB	(England) Fela Abidekun	Undisclosed	
14 July 2026	CF	(England) Kien Connolly	Undisclosed	
14 July 2026	RB	(England) Alex Faux	Undisclosed	
14 July 2026	CDM	(England) Ronnie Harvey	Undisclosed	
14 July 2026	CDM	(England) Max Jolliffe	Undisclosed	
14 July 2026	CDM	(England) Milton Oni	Undisclosed	
27 July 2026	RB	(Grenada) Kane Vincent-Young	Undisclosed	
28 July 2026	GK	(England) Tom Smith	Undisclosed	

== Pre-season and friendlies ==
On 2 June, The U's announced a behind closed doors pre-season friendly against Norwich City and a home fixture against Peterborough United. A third opposition was later added to the schedule, against Stevenage. On 19 June, a second home friendly was announced against Charlton Athletic. A day later, The U's added a trip to Harlow Town to the schedule. A sixth friendly was later announced, against Heybridge Swifts. On 23 June, a home friendly versus West Ham United was added.

Win Draw Loss Fixtures

11 July 2026 Friendly	Norwich City	0–0	Colchester United	Colney
14:00 BST		Report		Stadium: Lotus Training Centre; Attendance: 0 (BCD)

14 July 2026 Friendly	West Ham United	3–2	Colchester United	Romford
14:00 GMT		Report	Payne; Raggett	Stadium: Chadwell Heath Training Ground; Attendance: 0 (BCD)

17 July 2026 Friendly	Heybridge Swifts	0–4	Colchester United	Heybridge
19:45 BST		Report	Anderson 5', 11'; Ihionvien 24'; Connolly 76'	Stadium: Scraley Road

18 July 2026 Friendly	Harlow Town	0–5	Colchester United	Harlow
15:00 BST		Report	Lisbie 20'; Terry 23'; Payne 46' (pen.); Emery 78'; Kuffour Jr. 90'	Stadium: The Harlow Arena

21 July 2026 Friendly	Colchester United	2–3	Peterborough United	Myland
19:45 BST	Payne 33'; Oni 82'	Report	Edwards 8'; Leonard 77' (pen.); Khela 87'	Stadium: JobServe Community Stadium

24 July 2026 Friendly	Colchester United	2–2	West Ham United U21	Myland
19:30 BST	Raggett 51'; Oni 53'	Report	Landers 39'; Murphy 79'	Stadium: JobServe Community Stadium

28 July 2026 Friendly	Colchester United	0–2	Charlton Athletic	Myland
19:45 BST		Report	Godden 22'; Grant 23'	Stadium: JobServe Community Stadium

1 August 2026 Friendly	Stevenage	1–0	Colchester United	Stevenage
15:00 BST	Reid 19'	Report	Raggett (red card) 15'	Stadium: Lamex Stadium

== Competitions ==
=== League Two ===
==== League table ====
Pos	Team	Pld	W	D	L	GF	GA	GD	Pts	Promotion, qualification or relegation
19	Port Vale	14	5	3	6	15	18	−3	18	
20	Oldham Athletic	16	4	4	8	17	22	−5	16	
21	Colchester United	15	3	6	6	15	21	−6	15	
22	Rochdale	16	4	3	9	19	30	−11	15	
23	Rotherham United	15	2	7	6	18	25	−7	13	Relegation to National League

Updated to match(es) played on 21 November 2026. Source: EFL Official Website
Rules for classification: 1) Points; 2) Goal difference; 3) Number of goals scored; 4) Head-to-head results; 5) Wins; 6) Away goals; 7) Penalty points (sec 9.5); 8) 12-point sending off offences

==== Results summary ====
Overall								Home						Away					
Pld	W	D	L	GF	GA	GD	Pts	W	D	L	GF	GA	GD	W	D	L	GF	GA	GD
15	3	6	6	15	21	−6	15	3	3	1	8	6	+2	0	3	5	7	15	−8

Last updated: 21 November 2026.
Source: Soccerway

==== Results by round ====
Round	1	2	3	4	5	6	7	8	10	11	12	13	14	15	16	17	18	19	9^{1}	20
Ground	A	H	H	A	A	H	H	A	A	H	A	A	H	H	A	H	A	A	H	H
Result	D	W	W	L	L	D	D	D	L	D	D	L	L	W	L					
Position	12	5	4	8	12	13	15	15	19	20	19	21	23	21	21					
Points	1	4	7	7	7	8	9	10	10	11	12	12	12	15	15					

Source: EFL
A = Away; H = Home; W = Win; D = Draw; L = Loss; P = Postponed
Notes:
- ^{1} Matchday 9 (vs. Port Vale) was postponed due to international call-ups.

==== Matches ====
On 25 June, the League Two fixtures were revealed.

Win Draw Loss Fixtures

15 August 2026 1	Accrington Stanley	2–2	Colchester United	Accrington
15:00 BST	Caton 29', 45+1'; Anderson (yellow card) 89'	Report	Iandolo 24'; Hunt 60'	Stadium: Wham Stadium; Attendance: 1,959 (331 Colchester fans); Referee: Elliott Swallow

22 August 2026 2	Colchester United	2–1	Oldham Athletic	Colchester
15:00 BST	Iandolo (yellow card) 28'; Vincent-Young (yellow card) 36'; Anderson 63'; Temple 90+4' (o.g.)	Report	Appiah-Forson 20'; Kavanagh (yellow card) 30'; Scott-Morriss (red card) 45+2'; Norburn (yellow card) 51'; Hudson (yellow card) 75'; Daniels (yellow card) 88'; Nevitt (yellow card) 90+2'	Stadium: JobServe Community Stadium; Attendance: 5,186; Referee: James Durkin

29 August 2026 3	Colchester United	1–0	Rochdale	Colchester
15:00 BST	Hunt (yellow card) 37'; Williams 87'	Report	Gilmour (yellow card) 40'; Moss (yellow card) 80'	Stadium: JobServe Community Stadium; Attendance: 4,683 (283 away); Referee: Declan Bourne

1 September 2026 4	Bristol Rovers	2–0	Colchester United	Horfield
19:45 BST	James (yellow card) 22', (goal) 27'; Leigh (yellow card) 45+1'; Smallwood (yellow card) 79'; Harrison 90+3'	Report	Tucker (yellow card) 35'	Stadium: Memorial Stadium; Attendance: 7,663; Referee: Alex Chilowicz

5 September 2026 5	Swindon Town	3–1	Colchester United	Swindon
15:00 BST	Drinan (penalty missed) 49' 49', 77', 79'; Butler (yellow card) 54'; Munda (yellow card) 58'	Report	Kouassi 13'	Stadium: The Nigel Eady County Ground; Attendance: 8,253; Referee: Sunny Sukhvir Gill

12 September 2026 6	Colchester United	1–1	Crewe Alexandra	Colchester
15:00 BST	Anderson 27'	Report	Agius (yellow card) 46'; Stephenson 90+3'	Stadium: JobServe Community Stadium; Referee: Stephen Parkinson

19 September 2026 7	Colchester United	1–1	Cheltenham Town	Colchester
15:00 BST	Thorn (yellow card) 28'; Sesay 66'; Anderson (yellow card) 76'; Williams (red card) 83'; Iandolo (yellow card) 84'	Report	Mcwilliams (yellow card) 10'; Evans (yellow card) 18'; Weimann 78' (pen.); Tomkinson (yellow card) 85'; McCann (yellow card) 90+2'	Stadium: JobServe Community Stadium; Referee: Alan Young

26 September 2026 8	Shrewsbury Town	2–2	Colchester United	Shrewsbury
15:00 BST	Hoole (yellow card) 10', (goal) 29'; Lloyd (yellow card) 61'; Turner-Cooke (yellow card) 89'; Fletcher 90+2'	Report	Sesay 19', 90+5'	Stadium: The Croud Meadow; Attendance: 4,931; Referee: Jamie Robinson

10 October 2026 10	Newport County	1–0	Colchester United	Newport
15:00 BST	Nyakuhwa 79'	Report	Williams (yellow card) 40'; Lubala (yellow card) 48'; Ihionvien (yellow card) 76'	Stadium: Rodney Parade; Attendance: 4,658; Referee: Oliver Mackey

17 October 2026 11	Colchester United	0–0	Exeter City	Colchester
15:00 BST	Williams (yellow card) 17'; Lubala (yellow card) 79'	Report	Fitzwater (yellow card) 39'; Cummins (yellow card) 66'	Stadium: JobServe Community Stadium; Attendance: 4,984; Referee: Ben Atkinson

20 October 2026 12	Chesterfield	1–1	Colchester United	Whittington Moor
19:45 BST	Markanday 29'; Gordon (yellow card) 34'; Pond (yellow card) 54'; Stirk (yellow card) 79'	Report	Ihionvien (yellow card) 36'; Hunt (yellow card) 58'; Perry 82'	Stadium: SMH Group Stadium; Attendance: 6,974; Referee: Paul Howard

24 October 2026 13	Northampton Town	2–0	Colchester United	Sixfields
12:30 BST	Warhurst 9'; Evans (yellow card) 32'; Hoskins (yellow card) 15', (goal) 50'	Report	Sesay (yellow card) 30'	Stadium: Sixfields Stadium; Attendance: 5,959; Referee: Scott Jackson
Note: Fixture was initially scheduled for a 15:00 kick-off, but was brought forward for live Sky Sports broadcasting.

31 October 2026 14	Colchester United	1–3	Walsall	Colchester
15:00 GMT	Payne 35' (pen.); Digby (yellow card) 77'	Report	Skura 3'; Ahui (yellow card) 34'; Simper (yellow card) 68'; Pressley 79'; Hancock (yellow card) 83'; Clarke 90+6'	Stadium: JobServe Community Stadium; Attendance: 4,122; Referee: Declan Brown

14 November 2026 15	Colchester United	2–0	Gillingham	Colchester
15:00 GMT	Williams (yellow card) 26'; Payne 61' (pen.); Anderson 72'	Report	Dobbs (yellow card) 64'	Stadium: JobServe Community Stadium; Attendance: 5,548; Referee: Lewis Sandoe

21 November 2026 16	Tranmere Rovers	2–1	Colchester United	Birkenhead
15:00 GMT	Ince 27'; Slater (yellow card) 52'; Jones 90'	Report	Raggett 42'; Williams (yellow card) 66'	Stadium: Prenton Park; Attendance: 5,894 (200 away); Referee: Harrison Blair

28 November 2026 17	Colchester United	v	York City	Colchester
15:00 GMT				Stadium: JobServe Community Stadium

1 December 2026 18	Grimsby Town	v	Colchester United	Cleethorpes
19:45 GMT				Stadium: Blundell Park

12 December 2026 19	Salford City	v	Colchester United	Kersal
15:00 GMT				Stadium: AIG Stadium

15 December 2026 9	Colchester United	v	Port Vale	Colchester
19:45 GMT				Stadium: JobServe Community Stadium
Note: Fixture was originally scheduled for 3 October, but was postponed due to international call-ups within the Port Vale squad.

20 December 2026 20	Colchester United	v	Fleetwood Town	Colchester
13:00 GMT				Stadium: JobServe Community Stadium
Note: Fixture was initially scheduled for a 15:00 kick-off, but was brought forward for live Sky Sports broadcasting. It was then later pushed back aa day due to Fleetwood in EFL Cup involvements on the preceding Thursday.

26 December 2026 21	Barnet	v	Colchester United	Edgware
15:00 GMT				Stadium: The Hive Stadium

29 December 2026 22	Colchester United	v	Crawley Town	Colchester
19:45 GMT				Stadium: JobServe Community Stadium

1 January 2027 23	Colchester United	v	Rotherham United	Colchester
15:00 GMT				Stadium: JobServe Community Stadium

9 January 2027 24	Fleetwood Town	v	Colchester United	Fleetwood
15:00 GMT				Stadium: Highbury Stadium

16 January 2027 25	Exeter City	v	Colchester United	Exeter
15:00 GMT				Stadium: St James Park

19 January 2027 26	Colchester United	v	Chesterfield	Colchester
19:45 GMT				Stadium: JobServe Community Stadium

23 January 2027 27	Colchester United	v	Northampton Town	Colchester
12:30 GMT				Stadium: JobServe Community Stadium
Note: Fixture was initially scheduled for a 15:00 kick-off, but was brought forward for live Sky Sports broadcasting.

30 January 2027 28	Walsall	v	Colchester United	Bescot
15:00 GMT				Stadium: Pallet-Track Bescot Stadium

6 February 2027 29	Rochdale	v	Colchester United	Spotland
15:00 GMT				Stadium: Crown Oil Arena

9 February 2027 30	Colchester United	v	Bristol Rovers	Colchester
19:45 GMT				Stadium: JobServe Community Stadium

13 February 2027 31	Colchester United	v	Swindon Town	Colchester
15:00 GMT				Stadium: JobServe Community Stadium

20 February 2027 32	Crewe Alexandra	v	Colchester United	Crewe
15:00 GMT				Stadium: Mornflake Stadium

27 February 2027 33	Gillingham	v	Colchester United	Gillingham
12:30 GMT				Stadium: MEMS Priestfield Stadium
Note: Fixture was initially scheduled for a 15:00 kick-off, but was brought forward for live Sky Sports broadcasting.

=== FA Cup ===
Colchester were drawn at home to Worcester City in the first round and to Mansfield Town in the second round.

Win Draw Loss Fixtures

7 November 2026 First round	Colchester United	1–0	Worcester City	Colchester
15:00 GMT	Williams 32'; Perry (yellow card) 84'	Report	Wise (yellow card) 28'; Burns (yellow card) 79'	Stadium: JobServe Community Stadium; Attendance: 3,004; Referee: Sunny Singh Gill

4–7 December 2026 Second round	Colchester United	v	Mansfield Town	Colchester
TBA GMT				Stadium: JobServe Community Stadium

=== EFL Cup ===
Colchester were drawn at home to Southampton in the first round.

Win Draw Loss Fixtures

8 August 2026 First round	Colchester United	0–2	Southampton	Myland
17:30 BST		Report	Larin 72'; Akachukwu 90+2'	Stadium: JobServe Community Stadium; Attendance: 5,822; Referee: Isaac Searle

=== EFL Trophy ===
==== Group stage ====
Colchester were drawn against Luton Town, Peterborough United and Ipswich Town U21 into Southern Group D.

Pos	Div	Team	Pld	W	PW	PL	L	GF	GA	GD	Pts	Qualification
1	L1	Luton Town	3	2	1	0	0	10	1	+9	8	Advance to Round 2
2	L1	Peterborough United	3	2	0	0	1	7	5	+2	6	Advance to Round 2
3	L2	Colchester United	3	0	1	1	1	2	4	−2	3	
4	ACA	Ipswich Town U21	3	0	0	1	2	1	10	−9	1	

Source: EFL

Win Draw Loss Fixtures

22 September 2026 Group stage	Peterborough United	3–1	Colchester United	Peterborough
19:00 BST	Edwards 28'; Ashfield 31', 42'; Mendonca (yellow card) 66'	Report	Akande (yellow card) 53'; Harvey (yellow card) 75', (goal) 79'	Stadium: Weston Homes Stadium; Attendance: 1,853; Referee: Sam Mulhall

3 October 2026 Group stage	Colchester United	1–1 (3–4 p)	Luton Town	Colchester
15:00 BST	Ihionvien 90'	Report	Cole 87'	Stadium: JobServe Community Stadium; Attendance: 2,549 (590 Luton fans); Referee: Dale Baines
	Penalties
	Ihionvien (penalty scored); Terry (penalty missed); Digby (penalty scored); Williams (penalty scored); Connolly (penalty missed)		Clark (penalty scored); Gore (penalty missed); Cole (penalty scored); Richards (penalty scored); Andersen (penalty scored)
Note: Fixture was initially scheduled for 6 October, but was brought forward three days due to both clubs initial league fixtures being postponed due to international call-ups.

10 November 2026 Group stage	Colchester United	0–0 (4–3 p)	Ipswich Town U21	Colchester
19:45 GMT	Musanhi (yellow card) 50'	Report	Doherty (yellow card) 45+8'	Stadium: JobServe Community Stadium; Attendance: 947; Referee: Richie Watkins
	Penalties
	Digby (penalty scored); Williams (penalty scored); Vincent-Young (penalty missed); Akande (penalty scored); Oni (penalty scored)		Turner (penalty missed); Mažionis (penalty scored); Fletcher (penalty scored); Pitts (penalty missed); Runham (penalty scored)

== Statistics ==
=== Appearances and goals ===
As of match played 21 November 2026

Players with no appearances are not included on the list; italics indicate loaned in player

No.	Pos	Nat	Player	Total		League Two		FA Cup		EFL Cup		EFL Trophy	
No.	Pos	Nat	Player	Apps	Goals	Apps	Goals	Apps	Goals	Apps	Goals	Apps	Goals
1	GK	(England) ENG	Tom Smith	1	0	0+0	0	0+0	0	0+0	0	1+0	0
2	DF	(England) ENG	Rob Hunt	16	1	11+1	1	0+0	0	1+0	0	1+2	0
3	DF	(England) ENG	Ellis Iandolo	17	1	14+0	1	1+0	0	1+0	0	1+0	0
4	MF	(England) ENG	Ben Perry	9	1	1+4	1	0+1	0	0+0	0	3+0	0
5	DF	(England) ENG	Jack Tucker	20	0	15+0	0	1+0	0	1+0	0	2+1	0
6	MF	(England) ENG	Paul Digby	16	0	6+5	0	1+0	0	0+1	0	3+0	0
7	FW	(England) ENG	Harry Anderson	12	3	11+0	3	0+0	0	1+0	0	0+0	0
8	MF	(England) ENG	Teddy Bishop	3	0	3+0	0	0+0	0	0+0	0	0+0	0
9	FW	(England) ENG	Bradley Ihionvien	16	1	7+6	0	0+0	0	1+0	0	1+1	1
10	MF	(England) ENG	Jack Payne	16	2	12+1	2	1+0	0	1+0	0	0+1	0
11	FW	(England) ENG	Leon Chiwome	11	0	1+8	0	0+0	0	0+1	0	1+0	0
12	FW	(England) ENG	Moses Sesay	16	3	12+2	3	1+0	0	0+0	0	1+0	0
14	FW	(England) ENG	Kylian Kouassi	6	1	4+1	1	0+0	0	0+0	0	1+0	0
15	FW	(Democratic Republic of the Congo) COD	Beryly Lubala	5	0	3+1	0	0+0	0	0+0	0	1+0	0
17	FW	(England) ENG	Jaden Williams	15	2	4+7	1	1+0	1	0+0	0	1+2	0
20	DF	(England) ENG	Sean Raggett	13	1	11+0	1	1+0	0	1+0	0	0+0	0
21	DF	(England) ENG	Jake Leake	2	0	0+1	0	0+0	0	0+1	0	0+0	0
22	GK	(France) FRA	Thimothée Lo-Tutala	19	0	15+0	0	1+0	0	1+0	0	2+0	0
23	FW	(Nigeria) NGR	Adrian Akande	3	0	0+1	0	0+0	0	0+0	0	1+1	0
24	DF	(England) ENG	Frankie Terry	10	0	4+3	0	0+0	0	1+0	0	2+0	0
26	MF	(Saint Kitts and Nevis) SKN	Jay Williams	12	0	11+0	0	1+0	0	0+0	0	0+0	0
27	FW	(England) ENG	Oscar Thorn	20	0	11+4	0	1+0	0	1+0	0	2+1	0
30	DF	(Grenada) GRN	Kane Vincent-Young	15	0	7+4	0	1+0	0	1+0	0	1+1	0
34	FW	(England) ENG	Kaion Lisbie	2	0	0+0	0	0+1	0	0+0	0	1+0	0
35	DF	(Zimbabwe) ZIM	Kurai Musanhi	1	0	0+0	0	0+0	0	0+0	0	1+0	0
39	FW	(England) ENG	Kien Connolly	13	0	0+9	0	0+1	0	0+0	0	1+2	0
41	MF	(England) ENG	Max Jolliffe	1	0	0+0	0	0+0	0	0+0	0	0+1	0
42	MF	(England) ENG	Milton Oni	3	0	0+0	0	0+0	0	0+1	0	0+2	0
44	DF	(Ghana) GHA	Samuel Kuffour Jr.	9	0	2+3	0	0+0	0	0+1	0	3+0	0
47	MF	(England) ENG	Ronnie Harvey	4	1	0+2	0	0+0	0	0+0	0	2+0	1

=== Disciplinary record ===
As of match played 21 November 2026

Includes all competitive matches. The list is sorted by squad number when disciplinary points / points per card / number of cards are equal. Players with no cards not included in the list.

Rank	No.	Pos.	Nat.	Name	League Two			FA Cup			EFL Cup			EFL Trophy			Total		
Rank	No.	Pos.	Nat.	Name	Yellow card	Second yellow card	Red card	Yellow card	Second yellow card	Red card	Yellow card	Second yellow card	Red card	Yellow card	Second yellow card	Red card	Yellow card	Second yellow card	Red card
1	26	CDM	(Saint Kitts and Nevis)	Jay Williams	4	0	0	0	0	0	0	0	0	0	0	0	4	0	0
2	17	CF	(England)	Jaden Williams	0	0	1	0	0	0	0	0	0	0	0	0	0	0	1
3	2	LB	(England)	Rob Hunt	2	0	0	0	0	0	0	0	0	0	0	0	2	0	0
3	3	LB	(England)	Ellis Iandolo	2	0	0	0	0	0	0	0	0	0	0	0	2	0	0
3	4	CM	(England)	Ben Perry	0	0	0	1	0	0	0	0	0	1	0	0	2	0	0
3	9	CF	(England)	Bradley Ihionvien	2	0	0	0	0	0	0	0	0	0	0	0	2	0	0
3	15	LW	(Democratic Republic of the Congo)	Beryly Lubala	2	0	0	0	0	0	0	0	0	0	0	0	2	0	0
3	47	CDM	(England)	Ronnie Harvey	0	0	0	0	0	0	0	0	0	2	0	0	2	0	0
9	5	CB	(England)	Jack Tucker	1	0	0	0	0	0	0	0	0	0	0	0	1	0	0
9	6	CDM	(England)	Paul Digby	1	0	0	0	0	0	0	0	0	0	0	0	1	0	0
9	7	RW	(England)	Harry Anderson	1	0	0	0	0	0	0	0	0	0	0	0	1	0	0
9	12	RW	(England)	Moses Sesay	1	0	0	0	0	0	0	0	0	0	0	0	1	0	0
9	23	RW	(Nigeria)	Adrian Akande	0	0	0	0	0	0	0	0	0	1	0	0	1	0	0
9	24	CB	(England)	Frankie Terry	0	0	0	0	0	0	0	0	0	1	0	0	1	0	0
9	27	CF	(England)	Oscar Thorn	1	0	0	0	0	0	0	0	0	0	0	0	1	0	0
9	30	RB	(Grenada)	Kane Vincent-Young	1	0	0	0	0	0	0	0	0	0	0	0	1	0	0
9	35	LB	(Zimbabwe)	Kurai Musanhi	0	0	0	0	0	0	0	0	0	1	0	0	1	0	0
9	39	CF	(England)	Kien Connolly	0	0	0	0	0	0	0	0	0	1	0	0	1	0	0
Total					18	0	1	1	0	0	0	0	0	7	0	0	26	0	1

== Awards ==
=== EFL awards ===
==== EFL League Two Manager of the Month ====
Month	Manager		Ref.
August	(England) Danny Cowley	Nominee	
