= Moses Sesay =

English footballer (born 2007)

Personal information
- Full name: Jonathan Moses Momoh Sesay
- Date of birth: 5 January 2007 (age 19)
- Place of birth: Lambeth, England
- Position: Central midfielder

Team information
- Current team: Colchester United (on loan from Southampton)

Youth career
- –2023: Chelsea
- 2023–: Southampton

Senior career*
Years	Team	Apps	(Gls)
2025–	Southampton	0	(0)
2026–	→ Colchester United (loan)	14	(3)

International career^{‡}
2025–	England U18	3	(1)
- * Club domestic league appearances and goals as of 06:21, 22 November 2025 (UTC) ‡ National team caps and goals as of 06:00, 27 August 2025 (UTC)

Jonathan Moses Momoh Sesay (born 5 January 2007) is an English professional footballer who plays as a central midfielder for EFL League Two club Colchester United, on loan from EFL Championship club Southampton.

== Club career ==
On 4 July 2023, Sesay joined Southampton on a scholarship deal after leaving Chelsea. On 21 January 2025, he signed his first professional contract with Southampton. Sesay made his debut for the club on 26 August in a 3–0 away victory against Norwich City in the EFL Cup after he replaced Flynn Downes in the 84th minute.

On 21 August 2026, Sesay joined League Two side Colchester United on a season-long loan. He made his debut for the club on 22 August in a 2–1 victory against Oldham Athletic after he replaced Rob Hunt in the 46th minute. On 19 September, Sesay scored his first goal for the club in a 1–1 draw with Cheltenham Town.

== International career ==
Sesay was born in England but is also of Sierra Leonean descent. On 18 March 2025, Sesay was named in the England under-18 squad for the first time for a trio of friendlies. He scored on his debut on 20 March in a 2–2 draw with Czechia under-18s.

== Career statistics ==
As of match played 21 November 2026

Appearances and goals by club, season and competition
Club	Season	League			National Cup		League Cup		Other		Total	
Club	Season	Division	Apps	Goals	Apps	Goals	Apps	Goals	Apps	Goals	Apps	Goals
Southampton	2025–26	Championship	0	0	0	0	1	0	0	0	1	0
Southampton	2026–27	Championship	0	0	0	0	0	0	—		0	0
Southampton	Total		0	0	0	0	1	0	0	0	1	0
Colchester United (loan)	2026–27	League Two	14	3	1	0	0	0	1 (Note: Appearance in EFL Trophy)	0	16	3
Career total			14	3	1	0	1	0	1	0	17	3
