= Milton Oni =

English footballer (born 2006)

Personal information
- Full name: Milton Jeremiah Oni
- Date of birth: 21 March 2006 (age 20)
- Position: Midfielder

Team information
- Current team: Wealdstone (on loan from Colchester United)
- Number: 20

Senior career*
Years	Team	Apps	(Gls)
2023–	Colchester United	1	(0)
2023–2024	→ Maldon & Tiptree (loan)	28	(1)
2026	→ Hornchurch (loan)	0	(0)
2026–	→ Wealdstone (loan)	5	(0)
- * Club domestic league appearances and goals as of 22:35, 10 November 2026 (UTC)

Milton Jeremiah Oni (born 21 March 2006) is an English footballer who plays as a midfielder for National League side Wealdstone, on loan from EFL League Two club Colchester United.

== Career ==
Oni progressed through the Colchester United academy, signing a first professional contract in June 2024. He had spent a significant portion of the previous season gaining first-team experience on loan with Isthmian League North Division club Maldon & Tiptree.

On 13 August 2024, Oni made his senior debut for Colchester United as a second-half substitute in an EFL Cup First Round victory over Reading. His performance drew praise from manager Danny Cowley, particularly noting his composure in scoring a penalty in the shoot-out victory. Four days later, he made his league debut, again from the bench, in a 2–0 victory over Milton Keynes Dons.

On 5 September 2024, it was announced by Colchester United that Oni would be out of action for several months after rupturing his ACL and tearing his Medial meniscus during a late tackle by a Brentford player during an EFL Cup Second Round match on the 28th August. Following more than a year out injured, he made his return to playing in an under-21s fixture.

On 27 March 2026, Oni joined National League South club Hornchurch on loan for the remainder of the season.

On 3 October 2026, Oni signed for National League side Wealdstone on a 28-day loan.

== Career statistics ==
As of match played 7 November 2026

Appearances and goals by club, season and competition
Club	Season	League			FA Cup		League Cup		Other		Total	
Club	Season	Division	Apps	Goals	Apps	Goals	Apps	Goals	Apps	Goals	Apps	Goals
Colchester United	2023–24	League Two	0	0	0	0	0	0	0	0	0	0
Colchester United	2024–25	League Two	1	0	0	0	2	0	0	0	3	0
Colchester United	2025–26	League Two	0	0	0	0	0	0	2 (Note: Appearance(s) in EFL Trophy)	0	2	0
Colchester United	2026–27	League Two	0	0	0	0	0	0	2 (Note: Includes EFL Cup and EFL Trophy)	0	2	0
Colchester United	Total		1	0	0	0	2	0	4	0	7	0
Maldon & Tiptree (loan)	2023–24	Isthmian League North Division	28	1	0	0	—		3 (Note: Appearance(s) in Essex Senior Cup)	1	31	2
Hornchurch (loan)	2025–26	National League South	0	0	0	0	—		0	0	0	0
Wealdstone (loan)	2026–27	National League	5	0	2	0	—		2 (Note: Appearances in National League Cup)	0	9	0
Career total			34	1	2	0	2	0	9	1	47	2
