= JobServe =

Employment website

JobServe Ltd.
- Formerly: Fax-me Ltd
- Type: Private company
- Industry: Online Job-Board
- Founded: August 1993, 23; 32 years ago in Tiptree, Essex, UK
- Headquarters: Tiptree, Essex, UK
- Area served: Europe, Australia, North America
- Key people: Robbie Cowling, Co-founder and Managing Director
- Parent: Aspire Media Group
- Website: www.jobserve.com

JobServe Ltd is a private company headquartered in Tiptree, Essex, United Kingdom, which runs an employment website, job adverts being placed on the site on behalf of employers and employment agencies. It is part of the Aspire Media Group Ltd.

== History ==
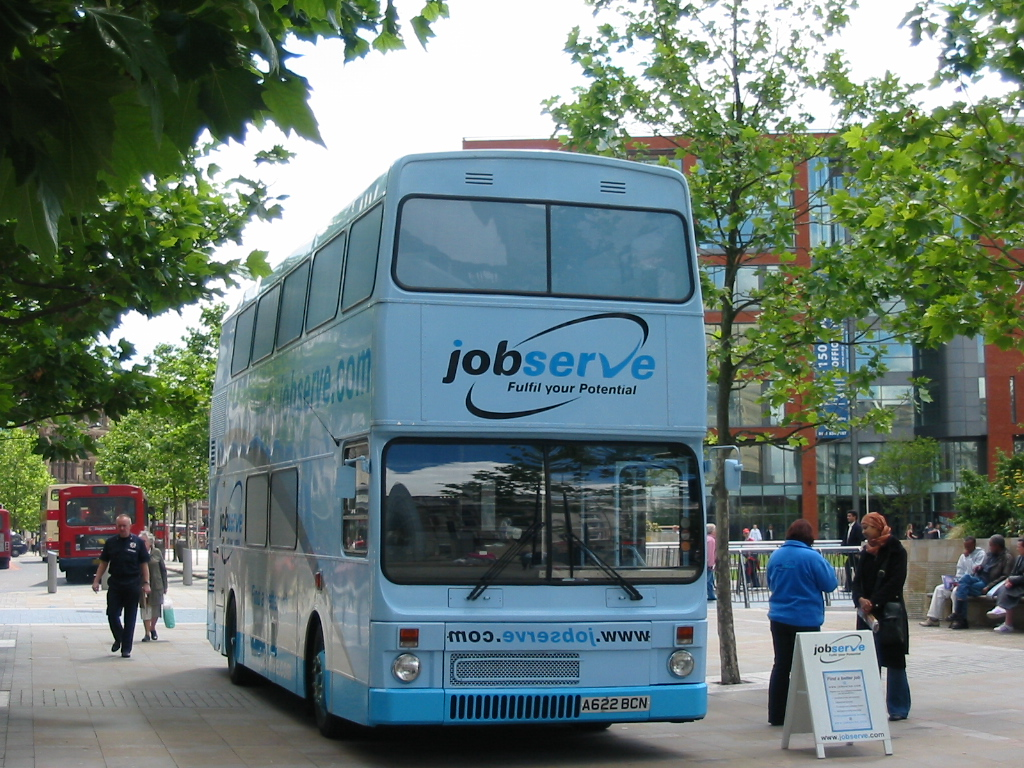
Jobserve recuitmment bus (A622 BCN), 5 July 2004

Founded by Robbie Cowling, an Information Technology (IT) contractor and his business partner John Witney, it was originally incorporated as Fax-Me-Limited in 1993 and later changing its name to JobServe Ltd. in 1995.

The company says the concept arose as the United Kingdom was rising out of recession in the 1990s and a problem area was identified with the IT workforce attempting to inefficiently find jobs through advertisements in recruitment magazines which would frequently turn out to be out of date. The company says it sought to address this on 4 May 1994 by the launch of a jobs-by-email service to send a daily and up to date list of targeted positions to job seekers. The company says it first created its website presence later in 1994 and it also claims this was the world's first recruitment website.

By 2001 it had become a dominant force in the market with observers being of the opinion it controlled up to 80% of the IT recruitment market. (Note: The Telegraph did not explicitly define the catchment area size, and one possibility is it was United Kingdom that was implied) This had led to litigation when it refused to accept advertisements from agencies associated with rival companies.

In 2003 Jobserve became the first dot.com company to be selected for the Queen's Awards for Enterprise. The year also saw Cowling buy out Witney with Jobserve moving into £1 million new premises in Tiptree.

By 2006 Jobserve was covering not only the IT sector but was covering 17 industry sectors in total.

JobServe is currently managed by its co-founder Robbie Cowling and USA division, Richard Padgett. As of November 2017 the company claims jobs-by-email still remained significant with a claim of 1.2 million job subscription emails being sent per day.

== Locations and partners ==
JobServe currently has its UK base Colchester in the United Kingdom.

A holding company, Jobserve Holdings Limited, was established in the year 2000 and renamed Aspire Media Limited in December 2008. (Note: At some point Jobserve must have moved under the holding company but a precise date is not known)

Jobserve and its parent, Aspire Media Group, has partnerships with a number of other brands.

It launched in Australia in 2002 with a base in Sydney.. In the United States of America there are offices in (North Carolina & Ohio)

== Football ==
The company has had involvements with local team Colchester United and was the shirt sponsor of Premier League club West Ham United between 2003–04 and 2006–07 seasons. In 2018 Jobserve won a competitive tender for the right for the Colchester Community Stadium to be named the Jobserve Community Stadium.

== Sources ==
- Aspire Media Group (28 November 2019). "Aspire Media Group". Aspire Media Group. Archived from the original on 17 May 2019.
- Bingemann, Mitchell (8 May 2006). "JobServe transforms applicants into employees with Alchemy - Computerworld". Archived from the original on 27 November 2019.
- Companies House (13 March 2019a). "Aspire Media Group Limited Limited". Companies House. Previous names. Archived from the original on 28 November 2019.
- Companies House (23 August 2019b). "Jobserve Limited". Companies House. Previous names. Archived from the original on 27 November 2019.
- Jobserve (1 August 2017). "The Company". Jobserve. Archived from the original on 1 August 2017.
- Jobserve (2019). "Partners". Jobserve. Archived from the original on 28 November 2019.
- Telegraph Staff (4 February 2001). "Jobserve in the dock". Telegraph. Archived from the original on 10 August 2017.
- Williams, Nixon (13 May 2004). "Sunday Times Rich List - Jobserve hits £100m". Contractor UK. Archived from the original on 27 November 2019.
