= Makise Evans =

English association football player

Personal information
- Full name: Makise Flavius Evans
- Date of birth: 20 August 2006 (age 20)
- Position: Forward

Team information
- Current team: Walton & Hersham (on loan from Colchester United)
- Number: 9

Youth career
- –2022: Enfield Borough
- 2022–2023: Stevenage

Senior career*
Years	Team	Apps	(Gls)
2023–2025	Stevenage	2	(0)
2023	→ Potters Bar Town (loan)	8	(1)
2024	→ Hornchurch (loan)	1	(0)
2024	→ St Albans City (loan)	5	(2)
2024	→ Tonbridge Angels (loan)	8	(0)
2025	→ Hampton & Richmond Borough (loan)	10	(0)
2025–	Colchester United	0	(0)
2025–2026	→ Bishop's Stortford (loan)	3	(1)
2026–	→ Walton & Hersham (loan)	2	(1)
- * Club domestic league appearances and goals as of 09:33, 7 October 2026 (UTC)

Makise Flavius Evans (born 20 August 2006) is an English professional footballer who plays as a forward for Walton & Hersham on loan from EFL League Two club Colchester United.

== Career ==
=== Stevenage ===
Evans signed a scholarship agreement with Stevenage ahead of the 2022–23 season, having previously represented Enfield Borough at under-16 level. In March 2023, he joined Isthmian League Premier Division club Potters Bar Town on loan, scoring his first senior goal in a 2–1 defeat to Lewes on 25 March 2023. At 16 years and 217 days old, he became Potters Bar's youngest goalscorer. Evans made nine appearances in all competitions during the loan before returning to Stevenage in April 2023. He made his first-team debut later that month, appearing as an 87th-minute substitute in a 1–0 defeat to Mansfield Town on 22 April 2023, becoming Stevenage's youngest ever player.

Having made one appearance for Stevenage during the 2023–24 season, Evans joined Isthmian League Premier Division leaders Hornchurch on loan until the end of the season on 27 March 2024. He later moved to National League South club St Albans City on a one-month loan deal on 5 October 2024, scoring twice in five appearances, including on his debut in a 4–3 defeat to Salisbury. In November 2024, Evans joined Tonbridge Angels on a work-experience loan, making eight appearances. He subsequently signed for fellow National League South club Hampton & Richmond Borough on loan on 13 January 2015 for the remainder of the season, featuring ten times.

=== Colchester United ===
Evans signed for League Two club Colchester United on 11 July 2025, agreeing his first professional contract. The club stated that he would initially join their under-21 programme to continue his development.

On 12 December 2025, Evans joined Southern League Premier Division Central club Bishop's Stortford on an initial one-month loan deal. On 16 May 2026 Colchester announced it had extended the player's contract.

On 23 September 2026, Evans joined newly-promoted National League South club, Walton & Hersham on an initial one-month loan.

== Style of play ==
Stevenage academy manager Jorden Gibson described Evans as a "strong, powerful and raw talent".

== Career statistics ==
As of match played 6 October 2026

Appearances and goals by club, season and competition
Club	Season	League			FA Cup		EFL Cup		Other		Total	
Club	Season	Division	Apps	Goals	Apps	Goals	Apps	Goals	Apps	Goals	Apps	Goals
Stevenage	2022–23	League Two	2	0	0	0	0	0	0	0	2	0
Stevenage	2023–24	League One	0	0	0	0	0	0	1 (Note: Appearance in EFL Trophy)	0	1	0
Stevenage	2024–25	League One	0	0	0	0	0	0	1	0	1	0
Stevenage	Total		2	0	0	0	0	0	2	0	4	0
Potters Bar Town (loan)	2022–23	Isthmian League Premier Division	8	1	—		—		1 (Note: Appearance in Alan Turvey Trophy)	0	9	1
Hornchurch (loan)	2023–24	Isthmian League Premier Division	1	0	—		—		0	0	1	0
St Albans City (loan)	2024–25	National League South	5	2	—		—		0	0	5	2
Tonbridge Angels (loan)	2024–25	National League South	8	0	—		—		0	0	8	0
Hampton & Richmond Borough (loan)	2024–25	National League South	10	0	—		—		0	0	10	0
Colchester United	2025–26	League Two	0	0	0	0	0	0	0	0	0	0
Colchester United	2026–27	League Two	0	0	0	0	0	0	0	0	0	0
Colchester United	Total		0	0	0	0	0	0	0	0	0	0
Bishop's Stortford (loan)	2025–26	Southern League Premier Division Central	3	1	—		—		—		3	1
Walton & Hersham (loan)	2026–27	National League South	2	1	—		—		0	0	2	1
Career total			39	5	0	0	0	0	3	0	42	5
