= Oscar Thorn =

English footballer (born 2004)

Personal information
- Full name: Oscar Peter Thorn
- Date of birth: 22 March 2004 (age 22)
- Place of birth: Southend-on-Sea, England
- Height: 6 ft 0 in (1.83 m)
- Position: Right winger

Team information
- Current team: Colchester United (on loan from Lincoln City)
- Number: 27

Youth career
- Arsenal
- Billericay Town
- Bowers & Pitsea
- 2020–2021: Norwich City

Senior career*
Years	Team	Apps	(Gls)
2021–2023	Norwich City	0	(0)
2023–2025	Colchester United	30	(0)
2023–2024	→ Bath City (loan)	9	(0)
2024	→ Chelmsford City (loan)	5	(0)
2025–	Lincoln City	3	(0)
2026–	→ Colchester United (loan)	15	(0)
- * Club domestic league appearances and goals as of 17:10, 21 November 2026 (UTC)

Oscar Peter Thorn (born 22 March 2004) is an English professional footballer who plays as a right winger for EFL League Two club Colchester United, on loan from EFL Championship club Lincoln City.

== Career ==
Thorn began his career in the academy at Arsenal at under-10 level, playing for the club until under-14 level. Thorn subsequently played for Billericay Town and Bowers & Pitsea, before joining Norwich City as a scholar in 2020. On 3 August 2021, Norwich announced Thorn had signed his first professional contract with the club.

On 16 January 2023, Thorn signed for Colchester United on a permanent basis. On 24 November 2023, Thorn joined Bath City on loan. On 30 August 2024, Thorn signed for Chelmsford City on loan, initially until January 2025, before being recalled by Colchester on 19 October 2024. On 22 October 2024, Thorn made his debut for Colchester, recording an assist, in a 1–1 draw against Chesterfield.

On 26 August 2025, Thorn signed for League One club Lincoln City for an undisclosed fee signing a four-year contract. He made his debut the following weekend, coming off the bench in a 1–1 draw against Mansfield Town.

On 7 August 2026, Thorn rejoined Colchester United on a season-long loan for the 2026–27 season. He made his second debut for the club the following day, where he started in the EFL Cup defeat against Southampton.

== Career statistics ==
As of 21 November 2026

Appearances and goals by club, season and competition
Club	Season	League			FA Cup		EFL Cup		Other		Total	
Club	Season	Division	Apps	Goals	Apps	Goals	Apps	Goals	Apps	Goals	Apps	Goals
Colchester United	2023–24	League Two	0	0	0	0	0	0	1 (Note: Appearance(s) in EFL Trophy)	0	1	0
Colchester United	2024–25	League Two	26	0	0	0	0	0	3	0	29	0
Colchester United	2025–26	League Two	4	0	0	0	1	0	–		5	0
Colchester United	Total		30	0	0	0	1	0	4	0	35	0
Bath City (Loan)	2023–24	National League South	9	0	0	0	–		–		9	0
Chelmsford City (loan)	2024–25	National League South	5	0	0	0	–		–		5	0
Lincoln City	2025–26	League One	3	0	0	0	–		3	0	6	0
Lincoln City	2026–27	Championship	0	0	0	0	0	0	–		0	0
Lincoln City	Total		3	0	0	0	0	0	3	0	6	0
Colchester United (loan)	2026–27	League Two	15	0	1	0	1	0	3	0	20	0
Career total			62	0	1	0	2	0	10	0	75	0

== Honours ==
Lincoln City

- EFL League One: 2025–26
