= Sam Kuffour Jr. =

English footballer (born 2003)

Personal information
- Full name: Samuel Osei Junior Kuffour
- Date of birth: 4 July 2003 (age 23)
- Place of birth: Germany
- Position: Defender

Team information
- Current team: Colchester United
- Number: 44

Youth career
- Brentford
- –2020: West Ham United
- 2020–2022: Elite Coaching Academy
- 2022–2023: Hapoel Be'er Sheva

Senior career*
Years	Team	Apps	(Gls)
2023–2024	Cheshunt	21	(0)
2024–2025	Maldon & Tiptree	29	(4)
2025–	Colchester United	5	(0)
2025	→ Maldon & Tiptree (loan)	4	(0)
2025	→ Hornchurch (loan)	7	(0)
- * Club domestic league appearances and goals as of 13:02, 9 August 2026 (UTC)

Samuel Osei Junior Kuffour (born 4 July 2003) is a professional footballer who plays for as a defender for EFL League Two club Colchester United.

== Career ==
=== Colchester United ===
On 21 February 2025, Kuffour Jr. joined League Two club Colchester United, immediately returning to Maldon & Tiptree on loan.

On 8 August 2025, he joined National League South club Hornchurch on loan until January 2026, however he was recalled at the end of the following month.

On 7 October 2025, he made his senior debut for Colchester United, playing the duration of a 2–1 EFL Trophy victory over Gillingham. Having had his progress stunted by injury in an EFL Trophy tie with West Ham United U21s in December 2025, he made his return to first-team action in April 2026, making his first League Two start on the final day of the 2025–26 season in a 4–1 victory away at Cheltenham Town. Following the conclusion of the campaign, the club announced that they had taken the option to extend Kuffour Jr's contract.

== Personal life ==
Kuffour was born in Germany, the son of Ghanaian former international footballer Samuel Kuffour.

== Career statistics ==
As of match played 8 August 2026

Appearances and goals by club, season and competition
Club	Season	League			FA Cup		EFL Cup		Other		Total	
Club	Season	Division	Apps	Goals	Apps	Goals	Apps	Goals	Apps	Goals	Apps	Goals
Cheshunt	2023–24	Isthmian League Premier Division	21	0	―		―		1 (Note: Appearance in Isthmian League Cup)	0	22	0
Maldon & Tiptree	2024–25	Isthmian League North Division	33	4	0	0	―		3 (Note: Appearances in FA Trophy)	0	36	4
Colchester United	2025–26	League Two	5	0	―		―		3 (Note: Appearances in EFL Trophy)	0	8	0
Colchester United	2026–27	League Two	0	0	0	0	1	0	0	0	1	0
Colchester United	Total		5	0	0	0	1	0	3	0	9	0
Hornchurch (loan)	2025–26	National League South	7	0	1	0	―		―		8	0
Career total			66	4	1	0	1	0	7	0	75	4
