= Paul Digby =

English footballer

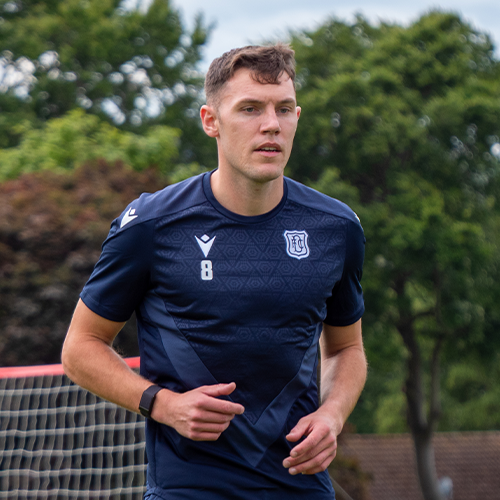
- Paul Digby during a Dundee training session in 2025

Personal information
- Full name: Paul Andrew Digby
- Date of birth: 2 February 1995 (age 31)
- Place of birth: Sheffield, England
- Height: 6 ft 4 in (1.93 m)
- Position: Central midfielder

Team information
- Current team: Colchester United
- Number: 6

Youth career
- 2006–2012: Barnsley

Senior career*
Years	Team	Apps	(Gls)
2011–2016	Barnsley	21	(0)
2015–2016	→ Ipswich Town (loan)	4	(0)
2016–2017	Ipswich Town	4	(0)
2017–2018	Mansfield Town	15	(0)
2018–2019	Forest Green Rovers	37	(1)
2019–2020	Stevenage	17	(0)
2020–2025	Cambridge United	198	(4)
2025–2026	Dundee	14	(0)
2026–	Colchester United	3	(0)

International career
2013–2014	England U19	3	(1)
2014	England U20	3	(0)
- * Club domestic league appearances and goals as of 1 September 2026

Paul Andrew Digby (born 2 February 1995) is an English professional footballer who plays as a central midfielder for EFL League Two club Colchester United.

== Club career ==
=== Barnsley ===
Digby started his career in the youth team at Barnsley and won the Most Promising Academy player in 2008, whilst playing the club's under-13 side. Paul won the award again in 2011 after his fine showings for the under 16's.

He signed a two-year scholarship with the club in the summer of 2011. He was brought into first-team action on 27 September 2011 in a 1–1 draw with Derby County in the Football League Championship. He came on for the injured David Perkins in the 33rd minute. In doing so he became the club's fourth youngest ever player at 16 years and 244 days. Digby went on to play three more times that season, his full debut coming at home against Birmingham on 21 February. Despite Birmingham City winning 3–1 the midfielder, who had just turned 17, put in a man of the match performance. Digby finished the 2011–12 season, making four appearances.

In the 2012–13 season, Digby signed a new contract with the club, keeping him until 2015 and switched number shirt from 32 to 17 ahead of a new season. Though he appeared in the substitute bench for three matches in the 2012–13 season, Digby, however, suffered a hip problem, resulting him absence for most of the season.

Ahead of the 2013–14 season, Digby signed another contract extension with the club, keeping him until 2017. Digby made his first 2013–14 appearance of the season, where he made his first start, in a 1–0 loss against Blackpool on 10 August 2013. However, Digby made five appearances of the 2013–14 season.

The 2014–15 season saw Digby making his first appearance on 16 August 2014, in a 2–1 win over Crewe Alexandra. Digby got a handful of first team appearances, making eleven appearances, due to player injuries despite his international commitment. The 2015–16 season saw Digby make his only appearance of the season against Fleetwood Town on 24 October 2014.

=== Ipswich Town ===
2015-16 season

On 4 January 2016, Digby joined Championship side Ipswich Town on loan for the remainder of the 2015–16 season.

In an interview with Manager Mick McCarthy he stated "This fella (Paul Digby) has got a bit of a pedigree in terms of him coming through the England youth ranks and he's come here and impressed. He's not looked out of place in training. In fact, he's looked very much at home. He's a good size, he's quick enough, he can actually play football from the back too. He can head it, he reads the game well, he doesn't mind a tackle and likes to block things".

The manager was full of praise for Digby and was very quick to make his way into the starting eleven, earning his first appearance for Ipswich Town in the FA Cup. They played against Portsmouth on 9 January 2016, just five days after signing for the club. The game ended 2–2 and set up a replay match at Fratton Park. The FA Cup replay took place ten days later on 19 January, earning Digby his second start in an Ipswich shirt. He went on to play the full duration of the game, unfortunately losing 2–1.

Digby made his Ipswich Town league debut on 27 February 2016, in a 1–0 win over Huddersfield Town, where he came on as a substitute. This secured Ipswich their second win in February, after losing their previous three games, Digby was instrumental to Ipswich holding onto their 1–0 lead.

He made two more appearances as a substitute that season, on the 5 March he came on against Nottingham Forest, securing another a 1–0 victory. His final substitute appearance was against Blackburn Rovers, where Ipswich came out victorious with a 2–0 win. After impressing in a number of substitute appearances, resulting in three victories for Ipswich Town, Digby was handed his first start in the league.

On 23 April 2016 Digby made his first start for Ipswich Town in the league. He played the full duration of the game against Middlesbrough, with the game ending 0–0, Digby recorded a clean sheet as he started in the centre of defence. Middlesbrough got promoted to the Premier League at the end of the season, showing that Digby was capable of performing well against the top teams in the Championship.

On 28 June 2016, Digby completed a permanent transfer to Ipswich, signing a 1-year deal with the option of a second. Digby's first game after signing for the club on a permanent basis came in the first round of League Cup, making his first start against Stevenage.

=== Mansfield Town ===
2017-18 season

On 16 May 2017 Digby joined Mansfield Town. Digby stated that he was "excited" and "delighted" to sign for Mansfield Town.

Digby made his debut for Mansfield Town on 5 August 2018 against Crewe Alexander. He came off the bench with the game finishing 2–2.

Just a week later Digby made his full debut against Forest Green Rovers. He started in Defensive Midfield and secured Mansfield Town their first win of the season, the game finished 2–0.

Digby finished the season making a total of 21 appearances for the stags.

=== Forest Green Rovers ===
2018-19 season

On 31 July 2018 Digby joined Forest Green Rovers. Manager Mark Cooper stated "We've been chasing Paul for the majority of the summer after being informed that he was available. We're pleased to get it over the line." He also explained that Digby was a "good footballer" and "it is a really good signing for us"

Digby was involved right from the start of the season, making his debut on 4 August 2018. He came on as a substitute against Grimsby Town, closing out a 4–1 victory on the first day of the season.

Forest Green Rovers were the last team in the EFL to remain unbeaten, with their unbeaten run stretching 12 league games. The unbeaten run lasted just over two months, with Digby making an appearance in all twelve of those games.

On 21 August 2018 Digby was handed his full debut, starting against Stevenage, the game ended 0–0. Digby started in the centre of defence, contributing to a successful clean sheet, the first of the season for Forest Green Rovers and Digby.

After the Stevenage game, Digby went onto to record 17 consecutive starts for Forest Green Rovers. He consolidated his position in the team, switching between the centre of defence and the centre of midfield, helping the team pick up 27 points during that period.

During that 17 game period, Digby recorded his first goal in a Forest Green Rovers shirt. It came against Cambridge Utd in the 34th minute when Digby expertly flicked on a header into the goal, leaving the keeper with no time to react. The game finished 3–1 to Forest Green Rovers

Digby picked up a couple of man of the match performances throughout the season. His first one came in the FA cup on the 10 November 2018 away at Oxford United. The game finished 0–0, earning Forest Green Rovers a replay. His second MOTM performance came later on in the season, away against Mansfield Town.

Digby managed to secure a play off spot with Forest Green Rovers, a massive improvement from last year. They climbed from 21st in the 2017–18 season to an impressive 5th place in the 2018–19 season. Digby was instrumental in their rise up the league, making 37 league appearances out of a possible 46 games.

=== Cambridge United ===
On 21 July 2020, Digby signed a 1-year contract with League Two club Cambridge United.

On 8 May 2025, the club announced he would be leaving in June when his contract expired after making 229 appearances in his 5-year stint with the U's.

=== Dundee ===
On 12 June 2025, Digby joined Scottish Premiership club Dundee on a two-year deal. After making 18 appearances for the club but not appearing since January, Digby left the club by mutual consent in July 2026.

=== Colchester United ===
On 7 July 2026, Digby returned to English football, signing with EFL League Two club Colchester United.

== International career ==
On 15 August 2013, Digby was called up by England U19 squad and made his England U19 debut, coming on as a substitute in the 58th minute, in a 6–1 win over Estonia U19. Digby scored his first England U19 goal on 14 November 2013, in a 4–1 win over Hungary. Digby made another appearance for England U19 against Turkey U19.

On 28 August 2014, Digby was called up by England U20 squad. Digby made his England U20 debut on 9 October 2014, in a 1–0 win over Germany U20. Digby made two more appearances against Turkey U20 and Canada U20.

== Career statistics ==
As of match played 1 September 2026

Appearances and goals by club, season and competition
Club	Season	League			National cup (Note: Includes FA Cup, Scottish Cup)		League cup (Note: Includes EFL Cup, Scottish League Cup)		Other		Total	
Club	Season	Division	Apps	Goals	Apps	Goals	Apps	Goals	Apps	Goals	Apps	Goals
Barnsley	2011–12	Championship	4	0	0	0	0	0	—		4	0
Barnsley	2012–13	Championship	0	0	0	0	0	0	—		0	0
Barnsley	2013–14	Championship	5	0	0	0	0	0	—		5	0
Barnsley	2014–15	League One	11	0	2	0	0	0	0	0	13	0
Barnsley	2015–16	League One	1	0	0	0	0	0	2 (Note: Appearances in Football League Trophy)	0	3	0
Barnsley	Total		21	0	2	0	0	0	2	0	25	0
Ipswich Town (loan)	2015–16	Championship	4	0	2	0	0	0	—		6	0
Ipswich Town	2016–17	Championship	4	0	1	0	1	0	—		6	0
Ipswich Town	Total		8	0	3	0	1	0	0	0	12	0
Mansfield Town	2017–18	League Two	15	0	1	0	1	0	4 (Note: Appearances in EFL Trophy)	0	21	0
Forest Green Rovers	2018–19	League Two	37	1	2	0	2	0	4	0	45	1
Stevenage	2019–20	League Two	17	0	0	0	0	0	3	0	20	0
Cambridge United	2020–21	League Two	35	0	0	0	2	0	4	0	41	0
Cambridge United	2021–22	League One	44	1	5	0	2	0	4	1	55	2
Cambridge United	2022–23	League One	46	1	3	0	2	0	0	0	51	1
Cambridge United	2023–24	League One	42	1	3	0	1	0	0	0	46	1
Cambridge United	2024–25	League One	31	1	1	0	1	1	3	0	36	2
Cambridge United	Total		198	4	12	0	8	1	11	1	229	6
Dundee	2025–26	Scottish Premiership	14	0	0	0	4	0	0	0	18	0
Colchester United	2026–27	League Two	3	0	0	0	1	0	0	0	4	0
Career total			313	5	20	0	17	1	24	1	374	7
