= Kurai Musanhi =

Zimbabwean football player (born 2005)

Personal information
- Full name: Kurainashe Musanhi
- Date of birth: 14 March 2006 (age 20)
- Place of birth: Enfield, England
- Height: 1.74 m (5 ft 9 in)
- Position: Left-back

Team information
- Current team: Colchester United
- Number: 35

Youth career
- Hadley Rangers
- Potters Bar Town

Senior career*
Years	Team	Apps	(Gls)
2022–2024	Hertford Town	34	(1)
2022–2023	→ Leverstock Green (loan)	16	(0)
2024–2025	Crystal Palace	0	(0)
2025–	Colchester United	0	(0)

International career^{‡}
2024	Zimbabwe U20	4	(0)
2025–	Zimbabwe	1	(0)
- * Club domestic league appearances and goals as of 18:55, 17 June 2025 (UTC) ‡ National team caps and goals as of 18:55, 17 June 2025 (UTC)

Kurainashe Musanhi (born 14 March 2006) is a professional football player who plays as left-back for Colchester United. Born in England, he plays for the Zimbabwe national team.

== Career ==
Musanhi is a product of the youth academies of Hadley Rangers and Potters Bar Town. In 2022, he began his senior career with Hertford Town. On 23 August 2024, he transferred to Crystal Palace. On 29 July 2025, he transferred to Colchester United where he joined their U23s. On 16 May 2026 the club announced it had extended the player's contract.

== International career ==
Born in England, Musanhi is of Zimbabwean descent. He debuted with the Zimbabwe national team for the 2025 COSAFA Cup.

== Career statistics ==
=== International ===
As of match played 7 June 2025

Appearances and goals by national team and year
National team	Year	Apps	Goals
Zimbabwe	2025	1	0
Total		1	0
