= Max Jolliffe =

English footballer (born 2005)

Personal information
- Full name: Max James Jolliffe
- Date of birth: 13 September 2005 (age 21)
- Position: Midfielder

Team information
- Current team: Colchester United
- Number: 41

Youth career
- –2022: Arsenal
- 2022–: Colchester United

Senior career*
Years	Team	Apps	(Gls)
2024–	Colchester United	3	(0)
2024	→ Maldon & Tiptree (loan)	19	(0)
2025	→ Billericay Town (loan)	2	(0)
2025–2026	→ Yeovil Town (loan)	10	(0)
2026	→ Salisbury (loan)	16	(2)
- * Club domestic league appearances and goals as of 12:57, 3 May 2026 (UTC)

Max James Jolliffe (born 13 September 2005) is an English footballer who plays as a midfielder for EFL League Two club Colchester United.

== Career ==
Jolliffe joined Colchester United in 2022 following his departure from the Arsenal Academy, signing a first professional contract in June 2024.

In August 2024, Jolliffe joined Isthmian League North Division side Maldon & Tiptree on loan. Following his return to Colchester United, Jolliffe began training with the first-team and was handed a senior debut on 15 March 2025, featuring as a late substitute in a 3–0 victory over Fleetwood Town.

On 26 September 2025, Jolliffe joined Isthmian League Premier Division club Billericay Town on an initial one-month loan deal.

On 23 October 2025, Jolliffe joined National League club Yeovil Town on loan for the remainder of the 2025–26 season. On 30 January 2026, Jolliffe was recalled by Colchester United from his loan spell, having made 10 appearances during his time at Huish Park. The following day, he joined National League South club Salisbury on loan.

== Career statistics ==
As of end of 2025–26 season

Appearances and goals by club, season and competition
Club	Season	League			FA Cup		League Cup		Other		Total	
Club	Season	Division	Apps	Goals	Apps	Goals	Apps	Goals	Apps	Goals	Apps	Goals
Colchester United	2024–25	League Two	2	0	0	0	0	0	0	0	2	0
Colchester United	2025–26	League Two	1	0	0	0	0	0	0	0	1	0
Colchester United	Total		3	0	0	0	0	0	0	0	3	0
Maldon & Tiptree (loan)	2024–25	Isthmian League North Division	19	0	0	0	—		2 (Note: Appearance(s) in FA Trophy)	0	21	0
Billericay Town (loan)	2025–26	Isthmian League Premier Division	2	0	3	0	—		1	0	6	0
Yeovil Town (loan)	2025–26	National League	10	0	—		—		—		10	0
Salisbury (loan)	2025–26	National League South	16	2	—		—		—		16	2
Career total			50	2	3	0	0	0	3	0	56	2
