= Spicerhaart =

English estate agency

Spicerhaart Group
- Type: Ltd
- Industry: Estate agents
- Founded: 1989
- Headquarters: Colchester, Essex
- Key people: Paul Smith, Executive Chairman.
- Revenue: £139.3 million (2022)
- Owner: VRS Investments Ltd
- Number of employees: 1,650+
- Website: spicerhaart.co.uk

Spicerhaart Group Ltd is an English estate agency, lettings agency and financial services company with its Head Office based in Colchester, Essex, and operating throughout the United Kingdom. It is the largest independent estate agency network in the UK.

== History ==
In 1989, Spicerhaart was founded by Paul Smith and his father Alick Smith when they opened three branches of Spicer McColl in East Anglia.

Throughout the years it has grown substantially due to both organic growth and various acquisitions. Today it has seven estate agency brands offering an extensive range of property related services.

Company History

1989 - Spicer McColl launches with three branches
1990 - Mortgages Direct launches, now known as Just Mortgages
1995 - Part of Cornerstone acquired and renamed Spicer McColl
1998 - Felicity J Lord opens in London
1999 - Woolwich Property Services acquired and renamed haart
2000 - Darlows in Wales acquired
2002 - Spicerhaart Legal Services established
2003 - Spicerhaart Corporate Sales established
2007 - Haybrook in South Yorkshire acquired
2007 - Launch of Valunation surveying services
2009 - Mustbesold.com auctions and Chainfree.com website begin
2011 - Spicerhaart acquires well-known London estate agent Thompson Currie
2011 - Spicerhaart acquires Brooks property agent in North London
2012 - Spicerhaart acquires Horsham-based Harper James
2013 - Launch of Chewton Rose brand
2017 - butters john bee in the M6 corridor acquired
2018 - Brian Holt brand in the Coventry area acquired
2018 - Howards in Norfolk and north Suffolk acquired
2021 - Launch of JustWealth

== Management ==
Paul Smith is the Executive Chairman of the company.

Antony Lark and John Phillips operate as joint CEO's.

Recent director appointments include:-

- Samantha McLoughlin - HR Director (1 July 23)
- Timothy Wardley - MD Land & New Homes (1 July 2022)
- Steven Lamb - Chief Information Officer (1 January 2021)

The company's headquarters, support services and contact centre are in Colchester, Essex.

== Estate agency and related brands ==
Spicerhaart currently trade under the following brands:

- Butters John Bee (Staffordshire, Cheshire & Shropshire)
- Chewton Rose (South England and Midlands)
- Darlows (Cardiff and Wales)
- Felicity J Lord (London area)
- haart (across England)
- Haybrook (South Yorkshire)
- Howards (Norfolk)
- Just Mortgages
- Just Wealth
- Spicerhaart Corporate Sales
- Spicerhaart Land and New Homes
- Valunation

== Criticism ==
- Mar 2020 - Spicerhaart came under criticism during the COVID-19 outbreak by terminating hundreds of staff the day prior to the furlough scheme.
- Oct 2012 - Tesco in legal battle with estate agents Spicerhaart - Companies file claim and counter claim in aftermath of supermarket's sale of embryonic online home-selling business.
