= Kien Connolly =

English footballer (born 2005)

Personal information
- Full name: Kien Cadee Connolly
- Date of birth: 2 September 2005 (age 21)
- Place of birth: London, England, United Kingdom
- Height: 6 ft 3 in (1.91 m)
- Position: Forward

Team information
- Current team: Colchester United
- Number: 39

Youth career
- 2022–2023: Concord Rangers
- 2023: Barking
- 2023: Great Wakering Rovers

Senior career*
Years	Team	Apps	(Gls)
2023–2024	Grays Athletic	8	(3)
2024–	Colchester United	5	(0)
2024–2025	Maldon & Tiptree (loan)	18	(5)
2025–2026	AFC Sudbury (loan)	12	(7)
2026	Dagenham & Redbridge (loan)	12	(2)
- * Club domestic league appearances and goals as of 14:38, 20 October 2026 (UTC)

Kien Cadee Connolly (born 2 September 2005) is an English professional footballer who plays as a Centre forward for League Two club Colchester United.

== Club career ==
After stints with Concord Rangers, Barking and Great Wakering Rovers, Connolly signed for Isthmian League North Division side Grays Athletic in December 2023.

=== Colchester United ===
On 6 June 2024 it was announced that Connolly would join the Colchester United Development squad on 1 July following the expiry of his Grays contract.

Following loan spells with Maldon & Tiptree, AFC Sudbury and Dagenham & Redbridge, he signed a new contract in July 2026.

He made his first team debut for the club as a 82nd minute substitute for Kane Vincent-Young in a 2–1 victory over Oldham Athletic in August 2026.

== Career statistics ==
=== Club ===
As of 20 October 2026

Appearances and goals by club, season and competition
Club	Season	League			FA Cup		EFL Cup		Other		Total	
Club	Season	Division (Tier)	Apps	Goals	Apps	Goals	Apps	Goals	Apps	Goals	Apps	Goals
Grays Athletic	2023–24	Isthmian League North (8)	8	3	0	0	—		1 (Note: Appearance(s) in Essex Senior Cup)	0	9	3
Colchester United	2024–25	League Two (4)	0	0	0	0	0	0	0	0	0	0
Colchester United	2025–26	League Two (4)	0	0	0	0	0	0	0	0	0	0
Colchester United	2026–27	League Two (4)	5	0	0	0	0	0	1 (Note: Appearance(s) in EFL Trophy)	0	6	0
Colchester United	Total		5	0	0	0	0	0	1	0	4	0
Maldon & Tiptree (loan)	2024–25	Isthmian North (8)	18	5	1	0	0	0	0	0	19	5
AFC Sudbury (loan)	2025–26	Southern League Premier Central (7)	12	7	0	0	0	0	0	0	12	7
Dagenham & Redbridge (loan)	2025–26	National League South (6)	12	2	0	0	0	0	0	0	12	2
Career total			55	17	1	0	0	0	2	0	58	17
