= Jaden Williams =

English footballer (born 2004)

Personal information
- Full name: Jaden Pharell Earl Williams
- Date of birth: 6 September 2004 (age 22)
- Position: Forward

Team information
- Current team: Colchester United
- Number: 17

Youth career
- 2010–2025: Tottenham Hotspur

Senior career*
Years	Team	Apps	(Gls)
2025–	Colchester United	46	(1)
- * Club domestic league appearances and goals as of 14:28, 22 November 2026 (UTC)

Jaden Pharell Earl Williams (born 6 September 2004) is an English professional footballer who plays as a forward for Colchester United.

== Career ==
Williams signed for Tottenham Hotspur at the age of 6, turning professional in June 2023. He moved to Colchester United in June 2025.

== Career statistics ==
As of match played 21 November 2026

Appearances and goals by club, season and competition
Club	Season	League			FA Cup		EFL Cup		Other		Total	
Club	Season	Division	Apps	Goals	Apps	Goals	Apps	Goals	Apps	Goals	Apps	Goals
Tottenham Hotspur U21	2022–23	—			—		—		1 (Note: Appearance(s) in EFL Trophy)	0	1	0
Tottenham Hotspur U21	2024–25	—			—		—		3	0	3	0
Tottenham Hotspur U21	Total		—		—		—		4	0	4	0
Colchester United	2025–26	League Two	35	0	1	0	1	0	4	1	41	1
Colchester United	2026–27	League Two	11	1	1	1	0	0	3	0	15	2
Colchester United	Total		46	1	2	1	1	0	7	1	56	3
Career total			46	1	2	1	1	0	11	1	60	3
