= Frankie Terry =

English footballer (born 28 February 2004)

Personal information
- Full name: Frankie Edward Terry
- Date of birth: 30 January 2004 (age 22)
- Place of birth: Havering, England
- Height: 1.83 m (6 ft 0 in)
- Positions: Centre-back; left-back

Team information
- Current team: Colchester United
- Number: 24

Youth career
- Colchester United

Senior career*
Years	Team	Apps	(Gls)
2021–	Colchester United	16	(0)
2021	→ Maldon & Tiptree (loan)	2	(1)
2022	→ Maldon & Tiptree (loan)	4	(0)
2022–2023	→ Chelmsford City (loan)	17	(1)
2023	→ Chelmsford City (loan)	4	(0)
2024	→ Aveley (loan)	14	(1)
2024–2025	→ Braintree Town (loan)	19	(1)
2025	→ Yeovil Town (loan)	10	(1)
2025	→ Braintree Town (loan)	21	(2)
- * Club domestic league appearances and goals as of 13:39, 3 May 2026 (UTC)

Frankie Edward Terry (born 28 February 2004) is an English professional footballer who plays as a left-back or centre-back for League Two side Colchester United.

== Career ==
Terry began his career in the academy at Colchester United. During the 2021–22 season, Terry was loaned out twice to Maldon & Tiptree, where he scored his first goal in senior football, coming six minutes into his first senior league appearance in a 3–3 draw against Dereham Town on 13 November 2021. Terry made seven appearances across his two loan spells at Maldon in all competitions, scoring once.

On 30 September 2022, Terry signed for National League South club Chelmsford City on loan. On 4 March 2023, Terry was recalled by Colchester, following the appointment of Ben Garner as Colchester manager, however, Terry was allowed to rejoin Chelmsford on loan eleven days later. At the beginning of the 2023–24 season, Terry joined Chelmsford for a third spell on loan, before being recalled by Colchester on 2 October 2023 due to injuries and suspensions after four appearances.

On 17 October 2023, Terry made his debut for Colchester, playing the full 90 minutes in a 2–1 EFL Trophy win away to Cambridge United.

On 10 February 2024, Terry signed for Aveley on a one-month loan deal.

On 4 January 2025, Terry made his league debut for Colchester United, starting a 2–0 home defeat to Accrington Stanley. In March 2025, he joined National League side Yeovil Town on loan for the remainder of the season. Terry re-joined Braintree on loan on 8 August 2025.

Terry was recalled by Colchester in December 2025.

== Personal life ==
Terry attended Notley High School.

Terry's father, Paul, played in the Football League for Yeovil Town and Leyton Orient. Terry's uncles, John Terry and Paul Konchesky, are both former England internationals.

== Career statistics ==
As of match played 8 August 2026

Appearances and goals by club, season and competition
Club	Season	League			FA Cup		EFL Cup		Other		Total	
Club	Season	Division	Apps	Goals	Apps	Goals	Apps	Goals	Apps	Goals	Apps	Goals
Colchester United	2020–21	League Two	0	0	0	0	0	0	0	0	0	0
Colchester United	2021–22	League Two	0	0	0	0	0	0	0	0	0	0
Colchester United	2023–24	League Two	0	0	1	0	0	0	2 (Note: Appearance(s) in EFL Trophy)	0	3	0
Colchester United	2024–25	League Two	1	0	0	0	1	0	1	0	3	0
Colchester United	2025–26	League Two	15	0	0	0	0	0	0	0	15	0
Colchester United	2026–27	League Two	0	0	0	0	1	0	0	0	1	0
Colchester United	Total		16	0	1	0	2	0	3	0	22	0
Chelmsford City (loan)	2022–23	National League South	17	1	0	0	—		3 (Note: Appearance(s) in FA Trophy)	0	20	1
Chelmsford City (loan)	2023–24	National League South	4	0	0	0	—		0	0	4	0
Aveley (loan)	2023–24	National League South	14	1	0	0	—		2 (Note: One appearance in FA Trophy, one appearance in National League South playoffs)	0	16	1
Braintree Town (loan)	2024–25	National League	19	1	2	0	—		3 (Note: One appearance in FA Trophy, two appearances in National League Cup)	0	24	1
Yeovil Town (loan)	2024–25	National League	10	1	—		—		—		10	1
Braintree Town (loan)	2025–26	National League	21	2	1	0	—		3 (Note: Appearances in National League Cup)	0	25	2
Career total			101	6	4	0	2	0	14	0	121	6
