= Colchester United F.C. =

English football club

Colchester United
- Full name: Colchester United Football Club
- Nickname: The U's
- Founded: March 1937; 89 years ago
- Ground: Colchester Community Stadium
- Capacity: 10,105
- Chairman: Robbie Cowling
- Head coach: Danny Cowley
- League: EFL League Two
- 2025–26: EFL League Two, 12th of 24
- Website: cu-fc.com
Home colours	Away colours	Third colours

Colchester United Football Club is a professional association football club based in the city of Colchester, Essex, England. The team competes in EFL League Two, the fourth level of the English football league system.

Founded in 1937, the club spent its early years playing in the Southern Football League until they were elected to the Football League in 1950. Between 1950 and 1990, Colchester spent their time between the Third Division and Fourth Division, during which time they produced one of their most memorable results, a 3–2 victory in the fifth round of the FA Cup over Don Revie's Leeds United in 1971.

Colchester United were relegated to the Football Conference in 1990 following a decline in the late 1980s, but won the Conference title in 1992 to make a swift return to League football. They achieved promotion to the Second Division in 1998 following a 1–0 win against Torquay United in the play-off final. The club were again promoted in 2006, achieving second place in League One. The following season, they achieved their highest league finish in club history, ending the season 10th in the Championship ahead of East Anglian rivals Ipswich Town, Norwich City and also Essex rivals Southend United, despite having the division's lowest attendance. The club returned to League One in 2008 following relegation from the Championship and then made a return to the fourth tier for the first time in 18 years in 2016.

Colchester United play their home games at Colchester Community Stadium in Colchester. They relocated to the stadium in 2008 when they moved away from Layer Road, their home stadium for 71 years.

== History ==
Chart of table positions for Colchester United in the Football League.

Until 1937, Colchester Town were Colchester's main club and were the original tenants of Layer Road. Colchester Town joined the Eastern Counties League in 1935, but their poor performances in the league convinced supporters that the club should turn professional, much like nearby Ipswich Town. With club officials against the idea of turning professional, a new professional club was formed in March 1937, Colchester United, which would also play at Layer Road. United joined the Southern Football League as crowds for Town matches dwindled. In December 1937, Colchester United formed a reserve team, signing many of Town's players. As a result of this and Town struggling with £300 debts, Colchester Town folded the same month.

The club were Southern League champions in 1939 prior to the Second World War. Following the war, in 1947–48, the U's produced one of the most notable FA Cup runs by a non-league side, defeating fellow non-leaguers Banbury Spencer in the first round, before beating Football League clubs Wrexham, Huddersfield Town and Bradford Park Avenue. They finally fell to Blackpool in the fifth round. This set them in good stead for potential election to the Football League.

Colchester United were elected to the Football League in 1950 on the back of their second Southern League Cup win and ending the 1949–50 season second to Merthyr Tydfil on goal average alone. They spent eleven years in the Third Division South and Third Division following the league's reorganisation, with a best finish of third place in 1957, just one point behind rivals Ipswich Town and Torquay United.

The club suffered their first relegation in 1961 as they finished 23rd in the Third Division, but didn't have to wait long until their first Football League promotion, spending just one season in the Fourth Division as they ended the season second to Millwall by just one point. This trend continued over the next two decades as they were relegated to the Fourth Division in 1965 and promoted to the Third Division in 1966, then relegated in 1968 and promoted in 1974, relegated in 1976 and promoted in 1977 before a final relegation to the Fourth Division in 1981.

During this time, the club embarked on one of the most notable runs in FA Cup history, as manager Dick Graham took his ageing side to the 1970–71 quarter-finals, dispatching non-league Ringmer, Cambridge United, Barnet and Rochdale following a replay. With the draw having been made prior to the replay against Rochdale, the U's knew they would face a home tie with First Division Leeds United, and duly trounced Dale 5–0. In the match with Leeds, the U's raced to an unprecedented 3–0 lead in front of a 16,000 Layer Road crowd, with two goals from Ray Crawford and one from Dave Simmons. Leeds did grab two goals back but Colchester held on for a famous 3–2 victory. The club faced Everton in the quarter-finals but succumbed to a 5–0 defeat in front of 53,028 at Goodison Park.

Financial difficulties and a number of changes at board level in the mid-1980s caused a slide towards the lower end of the Fourth Division table and crowd numbers to dwindle. Despite a brief turn around in form under former Rangers manager Jock Wallace, United were relegated from the Football League for the first time since their election.

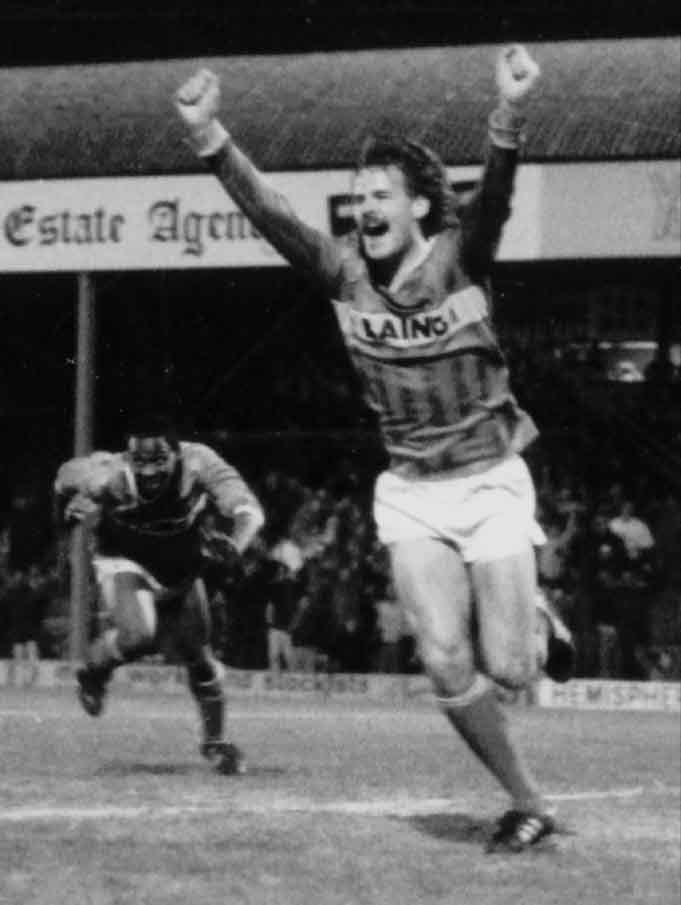
Former Colchester United manager Roy McDonough, who guided the club to the Conference title in 1992.

Despite their relegation, the U's remained a full-time club while playing in the Football Conference, as they sold their Layer Road ground to the Colchester Borough Council to clear the club's debts. The club finished the season as runners-up to Barnet during their first season outside of the Football League, but, under the stewardship of player-manager Roy McDonough, the U's won the league the following season on goal difference over bitter rivals Wycombe Wanderers. In addition to earning a swift return to League football, the club also won the FA Trophy in 1992.

The club had a successful 1995–96 season as they reached the 1995–96 Football League play-offs, but were defeated by Plymouth Argyle at the semi-final stage. The club narrowly missed the play-offs in 1996–97 but did however reach the Football League Trophy Final held at Wembley. The U's drew 0–0 with Carlisle United but were defeated 4–3 on penalties. The following season however, Colchester were promoted via the Third Division play-off final with a 1–0 Wembley win against Torquay United.

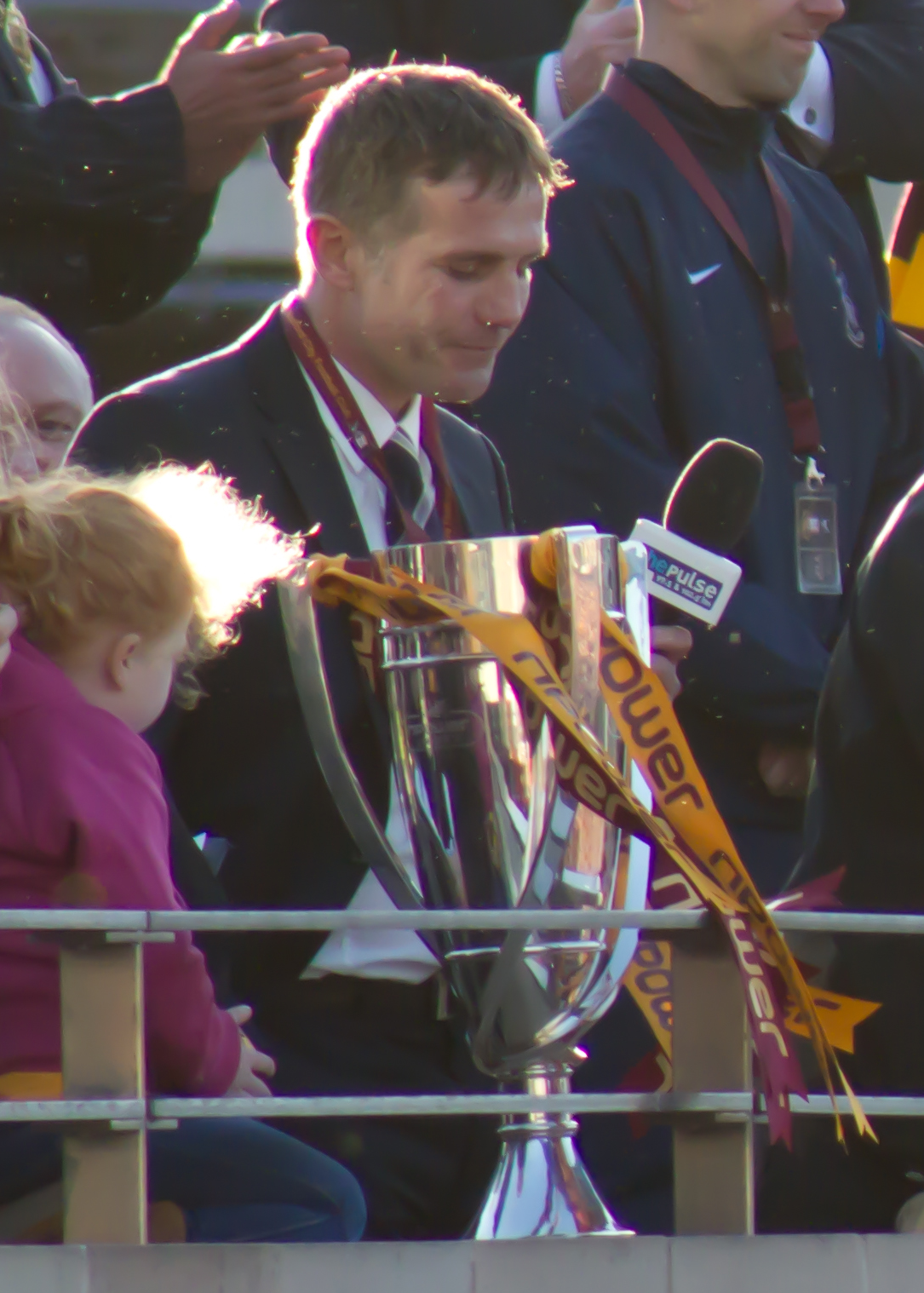
Former Colchester United manager Phil Parkinson, who guided the club to the Championship for the first time in their history.

Colchester consolidated their position in the third tier of English football for a number of seasons, before achieving their then-highest league finish of second place only to Essex rivals Southend United in the 2005–06 season. Under Phil Parkinson's stewardship, the U's were promoted to the second tier for the first time in their history. However, when Parkinson left to take the reins at Hull City, his assistant Geraint Williams was handed the daunting task of guiding Colchester into their first season in the Championship. He led the side to a 10th position finish, above East Anglian rivals Ipswich Town, Norwich City and Essex rivals Southend United, while gaining the Pride of Anglia title in the process for the first time in their history. The momentum however did not continue into their second season in the Championship, as they finished bottom of the league and were relegated back to League One.

During the club's second season in the Championship, Layer Road hosted its final game on 26 April 2008 as the U's fell to a 1–0 defeat to Stoke City. The club then moved to their new ground, the Colchester Community Stadium, in the summer of 2008 in preparation for life back in the third tier. Despite hoping to make an immediate return to the Championship, the club made a dreadful start to the 2008–09 campaign, which saw manager Geraint Williams lose his job, leaving the club second from bottom. He was replaced by former Wycombe Wanderers manager Paul Lambert as he guided the club to a mid-table finish.

Colchester United started the 2009–10 season by thrashing recently relegated Norwich City 7–1 on the opening day of the season at Carrow Road. Manager Lambert then defected to Norwich when their manager Bryan Gunn was sacked following a poor start to the season. This ensured a fiery return fixture, held at the Community Stadium in January 2010. The game saw a record crowd of 10,064 watch as the U's fell to a 5–0 defeat, with Ian Henderson being sent off on his United debut against his former club. The season ended with Colchester finishing in 8th position. The club finished in 10th position for both the 2010–11 and 2011–12 seasons, before narrowly avoiding relegation to League Two in the 2012–13 season, defeating Carlisle United 2–0 on the final day of the season to ensure their safety. The club then finished the 2013–14 season in 16th position.

Colchester secured League One safety on the final day of the 2014–15 season when they beat promotion hopefuls Preston North End 1–0 on 3 May 2015. However, Colchester could not stave off relegation to League Two in the 2015–16 season as they finished the campaign in 23rd position, confining them to the fourth tier of English football for the first time in 18 years.

In the 2019–20 EFL Cup, Colchester defeated Premier League side Tottenham Hotspur on penalties. Colchester were eventually eliminated by Manchester United in the quarter-finals, losing 3–0 at Old Trafford.

== Colours and crest ==
Period	Manufacturer	Shirt (home)	Shirt (away)
1975–1979	Umbro	None	
1979–1980	Adidas	None	
1980–1982	Adidas	Royal London Group	
1982–1986	Le Coq Sportif	Royal London Group	
1986–1987	None	0800 Linkline	
1987–1988	Olympic	Norcross Estates	
1988–1990	Spall	Norcross Estates	
1990–1991	Scoreline	Holimarine	
1991–1992	Ribero	Colchester Hippodrome	
1992–1993	Ribero	The Sun	
1993–1994	Spall	Strovers	
1994–1995	Spall	SGR Colchester	
1995–1996	Vandanel	SGR Colchester	
1996–1997	Vandanel	Goldstar Fabrications	
1997–1999	Patrick	Guardian Direct	
1999–2000	Patrick	East Anglian Daily Times	Ashby's
2000–2002	Strike Force	JobServe	Ridley's
2002–2004	Strike Force	Tiptree Jams	
2004–2005	Admiral	ICS Triplex	
2005–2006	Admiral	Easy-Skip	188Trades.com
2006–2007	Diadora	MutualPoints.com	Smart Energy
2007–2008	Diadora	Haart	Smart Energy
2008–2009	Puma	Weston Homes	Smart Energy
2009–2010	Puma	Weston Homes	JobServe
2010–2012	Puma	ROL Cruise	
2012–2013	Puma	Various^{[A]}	JobServe
2013–2016	Puma	Weston Homes	JobServe
2016–2018	Macron	Weston Homes	JobServe
2018–2019	Macron	JobServe	
2019–2020	Macron	TEXO Scaffolding	JobServe
2020–2021	Macron	TEXO Scaffolding	Strikerz Inc.
2021–2022	Macron	TEXO Scaffolding	Workhorse Group
2022-2023	Macron	Workhorse Generation	
2023-2024	Macron	Workhorse Group	Eveson Row & Co.
2024-2025	Macron	HotLizard Ltd	
Current	Macron	The MEL Group	

When the club was formed, Colchester United continued in the tradition of their predecessors Colchester Town and played in blue and white striped shirts combined with white shorts. For the majority of the club's history, the kit has remained true to the traditional design, with slight variations occurring in 1967 and 1968, when candy stripes were preferred, with white on blue used for 1967–68 and blue on white for 1968–69. The stripes were removed altogether between 1969 and 1973, with blue shirts and blue shorts adopted between 1969 and 1972 as modelled by Chelsea, and white shirts for 1972–73 during a failed relaunch. The original stripes were reinstated for the following campaign, and remained largely unchanged since this period. The club briefly used blue kits with white pinstripes between 1982 and 1986, and a crosshatch design between 1988 and 1990.

The club adopted the coat of arms of Colchester for their club crest upon their formation in June 1937. The coat of arms, which features the living cross of St Helena and the crowns of the Three Kings, was used until 1972, when a dispute between the club and Colchester Borough Council pushed United to design a new crest. Tied to the rebranding of the club and the new all-white kit, the U's earned a new nickname (The Eagles) with a new badge featuring a Roman eagle standard. Following a disastrous season where the club were obliged to seek re-election, the kits were reverted and the club played with no crest on the shirts until 1979. Adidas replaced Umbro as kit manufacturer and the shirts were adorned with a simple CUFC cypher. The club emblem was modified to a circular badge in 1983 based on the 1972 design and was once again adjusted in 1986, updating the image of the eagle. In 1994, the crest was modified from a circular shape to a shield shape, with the golden eagle set against a blue and white striped background, a nod to the club's traditional shirt colours. A slightly updated version was introduced in 2004 which rounded the shield, a design which has since remained unchanged.

A number of different manufacturers have provided the kits for Colchester United since the mid-1970s, with kits supplied by Umbro (1975–1979), Adidas (1979–1982), Le Coq Sportif (1982–1986), Olympic (1987–1988), Spall (1988–1990, 1993–1995), Ribero (1991–1993), Vandanel (1995–1997), Patrick (1997–2000), Strike Force (2000–2004), Admiral (2004–2006), Diadora (2006–2008), Puma (2008–2016) and Macron (2016–present).

Since the 1980–81, the club has offered sponsorship for its shirts, and offered away strip sponsorship from the 1999–2000 season. Primary shirt sponsorships have included Royal London Group (1980–1986), 0800 Linkline (1986–1987), Norcross Estates (1987–1990), Holimarine (1990–1991), Colchester Hippodrome (1991–1992), The Sun (1992, 1992–1993), Strovers (1993–1994), SGR Colchester (1994–1996), Goldstar Fabrications (1996–1997), Guardian Direct (1997–1999), East Anglian Daily Times (1999–2000), JobServe (2000–2002, 2018–2019), Tiptree Jams (2002–2004), ICS Triplex (2004–2005), Easy-Skip (2005–2006), MutualPoints.com (2006–2007), Haart (2007–2008), Weston Homes (2008–2010, 2013–2018), ROL Cruise (2010–2012), TEXO Scaffolding (2019–2022), Workhorse Group (2022-2024), HotLizard Ltd (2024-2025) and The MEL Group (current). Away shirt sponsorship has been provided by Ashby's (1999–2000), Ridley's (2000–2002), 188Trades.com (2005–2006), Smart Energy (2006–2009), JobServe (2009–2010, 2012–2020), Strikerz Inc. (2020–2021), Workhorse Group (2021-2024), HotLizard Ltd (2024-2025) and The MEL Group (current).

For the 2012–13 season, the U's marked their 75th anniversary with a special kit. The shirt was coloured in the traditional blue and white stripes, however, the kit did not carry a main sponsorship logo, as the club looked to promote local businesses on a game-by-game basis and to reflect on the club's early days without sponsorship.

== Stadium ==
=== Layer Road ===
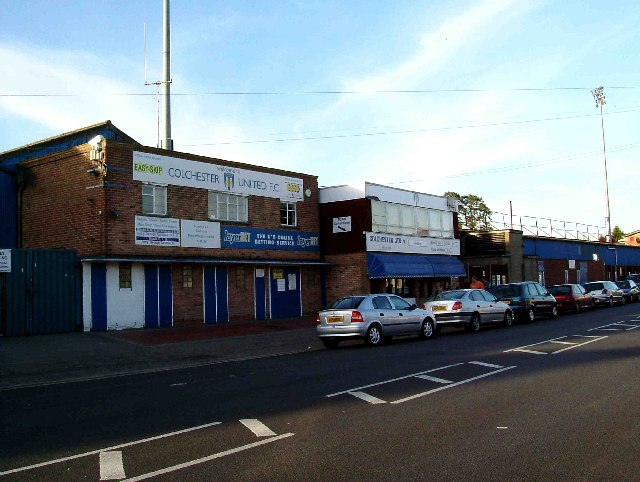
Layer Road

Colchester's Layer Road stadium was built in 1910 and was home to United's predecessors Colchester Town. The U's shared the facilities with Town, as Colchester United's first ever game at the ground came on 2 September 1937, a 6–1 win against Bath City. Gale-force winds almost destroyed the Layer Road End of the ground in January 1938. This was followed by the outbreak of World War II, and Layer Road was closed down by the club and passed over to Colchester Garrison. After the war, the club returned to the ground, as the Main Stand was extended for the 1946–47 season. Soon after, the Popular Side stand was demolished and the timber re-used to improve the Layer Road End.

The ground hosted the record home crowd for a Colchester United game on 27 November 1948 for an FA Cup first round tie with Reading. 19,072 fans gathered for the game which lasted just 35 minutes. The game was abandoned due to thick fog. More storm damage meant that the U's went into the 1949–50 season with no roof to the Layer Road End due to a steel shortage.

During Colchester's first season in the Football League, Layer Road hosted an average crowd of 10,573. This was to be the only time the club hosted a five-figure average at the ground. It wasn't until 1959 that the stadium had floodlights installed, with proceeds from an FA Cup game against Arsenal funding the installation. In 1971, the ground was purchased from Colchester Borough Council with a series of covenants placed on the ground, including the clause that the ground could not be sold for development into housing. In 1980, the club's chairman Maurice Cadman announced that Layer Road was in need of £280,000 of basic safety improvement to meet legislation. Plans were drawn up to remove the Open End altogether and construct a 5,000 capacity stand at the Layer Road End and a new main stand on the Popular side. The plans never came to fruition, as further plans for a new stadium were rejected by the council on the basis of the covenant. Following the Bradford City stadium fire and the Heysel Stadium disaster, Layer Road faced £500,000 worth of safety improvements. With the club struggling financially, sections of the ground were closed off, reducing capacity to 4,900.

Layer Road was sold back to Colchester Borough Council in the early 1990s for £1.2 million to help clear the club's debts, as Colchester United leased the stadium back. The council then started to identify and investigate potential sites for a new stadium. In the meantime, the club refreshed the stadium ahead of the 1996–97 season with the Clock End all-seated and covered. With the lease due to expire in 2002, Kirklees McAlpine were commissioned as consultants for a new stadium in 1998. A preferred site at Cuckoo Farm in Colchester was identified, with the additional benefit being that the land was already Council-owned.

Plans for a new stadium were submitted in April 1999, with planning consent approved in 2003. The Council backed the £14.23 million project by taking out a £10.23 million loan in November 2006, with the remaining £4 million supplied in the form of grants from the Football Foundation and local government and development agencies. Scottish firm Barr Construction were announced as contractors for the stadium, with work beginning in July 2007.

=== Colchester Community Stadium ===
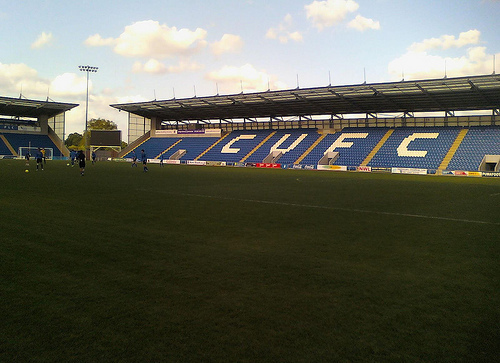
Colchester Community Stadium

When building work neared completion, Colchester United announced the official name for the stadium would be the Colchester Community Stadium, but owing to a deal with building firm Weston Homes, the ground would initially be known as the Weston Homes Community Stadium. The ten-year sponsorship would be worth up to £2 million for the club and included shirt sponsorship for the 2008–09 season. Upon the expiry of the deal, JobServe won the naming rights for the stadium in a further ten-year sponsorship ahead of the 2018–19 season.

The club played their final match at Layer Road in front of 6,300 on 26 April 2008 as they fell to a 1–0 defeat to Stoke City.

Colchester United hosted the opening ramp-up event to Spanish club Athletic Bilbao on 4 August 2008. The first goal scored at the stadium came from Aritz Aduriz for Bilbao after 15 minutes, with Scott Vernon equalising with a penalty kick on 32 minutes. The game ended 2–1 to ten-man Bilbao with David López Moreno scoring a penalty on 83 minutes. The first competitive fixture at the Community Stadium came on 16 August 2008 when Colchester hosted Huddersfield Town in front of a crowd of 5,340. Mark Yeates scored the first competitive goal at the stadium in a 2–2 draw with Oldham Athletic on 30 August 2008 and registered their first win on 25 October 2008, winning emphatically against Carlisle United. They scored five goals from David Perkins, Dean Hammond, Akanni-Sunday Wasiu and two netted by Mark Yeates.

Colchester Community Stadium has a capacity of 10,105 and the record attendance at the ground was 10,064 when Colchester hosted Norwich City on 16 January 2010 as they fell to a 5–0 defeat.

== Supporters and rivalries ==
Colchester United has an official supporters association known as the CUSA. They were formed in 1995 and is run entirely by fans on a volunteer basis. The club produces its own match day programme, titled "We Are United", which replaced the former untitled official programmes from the beginning of the 2012–13 season. The club have also had a number of fanzine publications produced over the years, including "The U'sual", "Floodlight", "Out of The Blue" and "The Blue Eagle". The club mascot is an eagle named Eddie the Eagle.

The 2003 Football Fans Census revealed that Colchester United fans considered Wycombe Wanderers to be their primary rival, with both Wycombe and Southend United considering the U's to be their primary rival. Colchester fans considered Ipswich Town to be their secondary rivals, with Southend only third. Cambridge United additionally considered Colchester to be their tertiary rivals. However, in the 2012–13 census, Colchester fans changed their chief rivals from Wycombe to Southend, with Wycombe falling to second and Ipswich to third. Ipswich Town fans also named Colchester United as their third rivals after Norwich City and West Ham United. The U's remained primary choice for both Southend and Wycombe fans. United were also ranked as the 12th least offensive club to the supporters of all other Football League clubs.

Colchester's main recent rivalry is with fellow Essex side Southend United, with whom they contest the Essex derby. The competitive head-to-head record is 34 wins to Southend, 30 wins for Colchester and 17 draws. The most recent result was a 2–0 win for the U's on 20 April 2021.

The club also contest the Pride of Anglia award, which they have won once when they finished in 10th position in the Championship ahead of East Anglian rivals Ipswich Town and Norwich City.

== Records and statistics ==
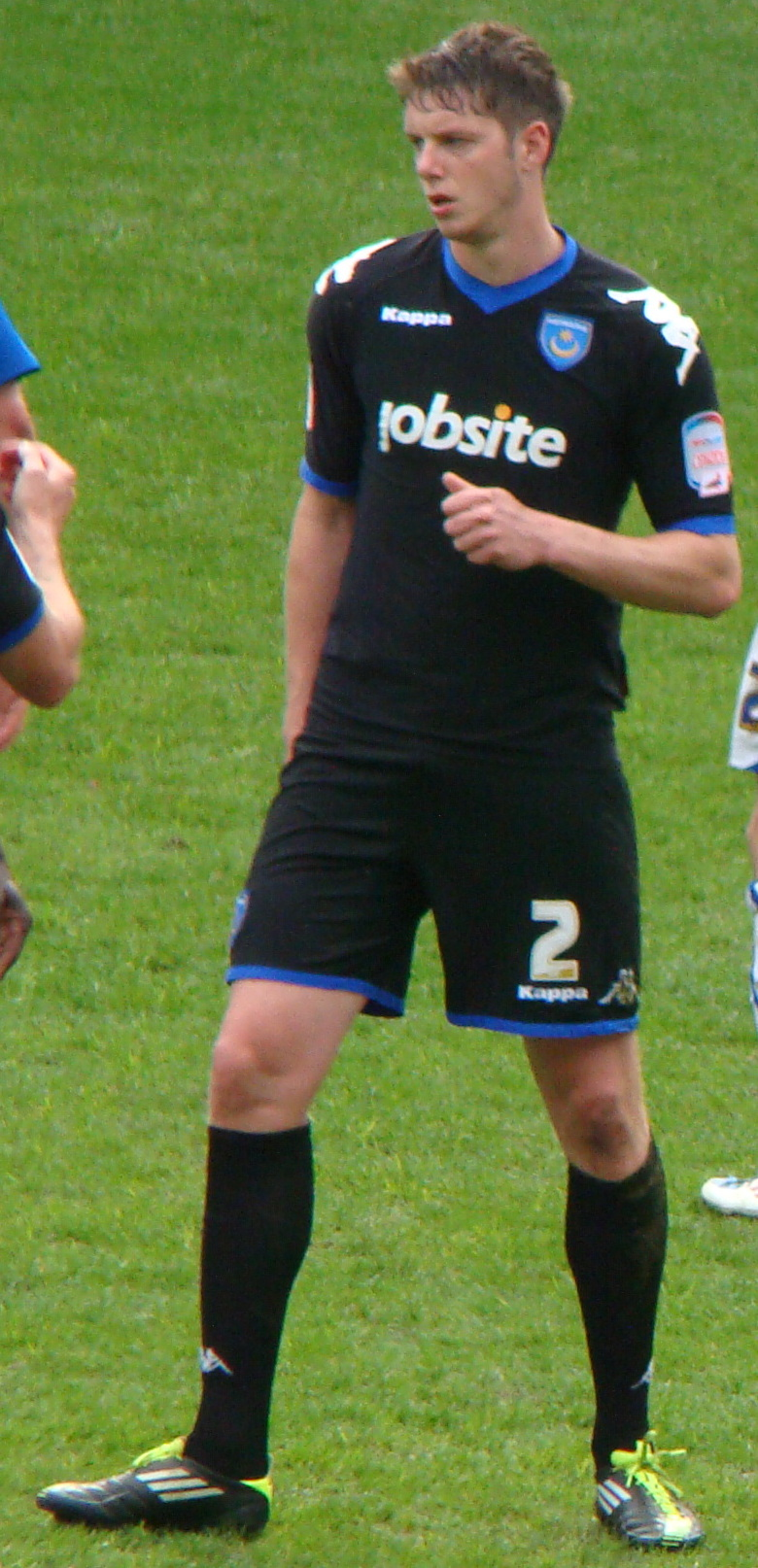
Greg Halford, who was sold to Reading for £2.5 million in 2007.

Micky Cook is the current Colchester United record holder for most appearances, holding the record for appearances made in both the league at 613, and in all competitions with 700 between 1969 and 1984. Mike Walker ranks in second with 524 appearances in all competitions, and Tony English third with 515. Tony Adcock holds the record for most goals in all competitions with 149, but Martyn King is the club's record league goalscorer with 132 goals.

Colchester United's widest margin victory in the league was a 9–1 win over Bradford City on 30 December 1961 at Layer Road. Their highest losing margin came on 15 December 1988 when they were thrashed 8–0 at Leyton Orient.

The club's record home attendance was for an FA Cup first round tie at Layer Road with Reading on 27 November 1948, when 19,072 fans turned up for a game that was abandoned after 35 minutes due to thick fog. The record Colchester Community Stadium attendance was 10,064 when Norwich City won 5–0 in a fiery match on 16 January 2010.

The highest transfer fee received for a Colchester United player is £2,500,000 for Greg Halford by Reading in January 2007. The highest fee paid by Colchester United for a player was £400,000 for Cheltenham Town striker Steven Gillespie in the summer of 2008.

== Players ==
=== First-team squad ===
As of 1 September 2026

Note: Flags indicate national team as defined under FIFA eligibility rules; some limited exceptions apply. Players may hold more than one non-FIFA nationality.

No.	Pos.	Nation	Player
1	GK	ENG	Tom Smith
2	DF	ENG	Rob Hunt
3	DF	ENG	Ellis Iandolo
4	MF	ENG	Ben Perry
5	DF	ENG	Jack Tucker (captain)
6	MF	ENG	Paul Digby
7	MF	ENG	Harry Anderson
8	MF	ENG	Teddy Bishop
9	FW	ENG	Bradley Ihionvien (on loan from Peterborough United)
10	MF	ENG	Jack Payne
11	FW	ENG	Leon Chiwome (on loan from Wolverhampton Wanderers)
12	MF	ENG	Moses Sesay (on loan from Southampton)
14	FW	ENG	Kylian Kouassi

No.	Pos.	Nation	Player
15	FW	COD	Beryly Lubala
17	FW	ENG	Jaden Williams
20	DF	ENG	Sean Raggett
21	DF	ENG	Jake Leake
22	GK	FRA	Thimothée Lo-Tutala (on loan from Hull City)
23	MF	NGR	Adrian Akande
24	DF	ENG	Frankie Terry
27	FW	ENG	Oscar Thorn (on loan from Lincoln City)
30	DF	GRN	Kane Vincent-Young
41	DF	ENG	Max Jolliffe
42	MF	ENG	Milton Oni
44	DF	GHA	Sam Kuffour Jr.
47	MF	ENG	Ronnie Harvey

=== Under-21s ===
As of 1 July 2027

Note: Flags indicate national team as defined under FIFA eligibility rules; some limited exceptions apply. Players may hold more than one non-FIFA nationality.

No.	Pos.	Nation	Player
34	FW	ENG	Kaion Lisbie
35	DF	ZIM	Kurai Musanhi
36	FW	ENG	Makise Evans
37	DF	ENG	Alfie Newby
38	DF	ENG	Alex Faux
39	FW	ENG	Kien Connolly

No.	Pos.	Nation	Player
41	MF	ENG	Max Jolliffe
42	MF	ENG	Milton Oni
47	MF	ENG	Ronnie Harvey
-	DF	ENG	Fela Abidekun
-	MF	ENG	Freddie Ingram

=== Under-18s ===
As of 1 July 2026

Note: Flags indicate national team as defined under FIFA eligibility rules; some limited exceptions apply. Players may hold more than one non-FIFA nationality.

No.	Pos.	Nation	Player
31	GK	ENG	Oscar Roberts
—	GK	ENG	Oscar Parker
—	DF	ENG	Donte Frank
—	DF	ENG	Caiden Lewis
—	DF	ENG	Sam McCree
—	MF	ENG	Ryan Mombo
—	MF	ENG	Lennox Emery

No.	Pos.	Nation	Player
—	MF	ENG	Nadim Dagher
—	MF	ENG	Neo Lieu-Smith
—	MF	ENG	Brume Okoko
—	MF	ENG	Riley Smith
—	FW	ENG	Josh Adesanya
—	FW	ENG	Dre Henry
—	FW	ENG	Noah Kalema

=== Notable former players ===
At the end of the 2006–07 season, Colchester United created a "Hall of Fame", with inducted players being one of "those who have made a difference to the club's history". Fans chose two inaugural players; Peter Wright and record appearance holder Micky Cook. Wright had previously been named as Colchester United's "Player of the Century" by Colchester's Gazette newspaper in 2000. A committee decided on a further three players to join the Hall of Fame in the same season, with Brian Hall, Mark Kinsella and Tony English chosen. New inductees have been announced most seasons since 2007, with the entire team that famously defeated Leeds United in the FA Cup in 1971 entered into the Hall of Fame. The manager of that team, Dick Graham was inducted as the first manager to the Hall of Fame in November 2007. The following list contains all those inducted into the Hall of Fame.

- (England) Tony Adcock
- (England) Ian Allinson
- (England) Percy Ames
- (England) Micky Cook
- (England) Bobby Cram
- (England) Ray Crawford
- (England) Jamie Cureton
- (England) Bob Curry
- (England) Karl Duguid
- (Republic of Ireland) Joe Dunne
- (England) Tony English
- (England) Steve Foley
- (Scotland) Duncan Forbes
- (England) Brian Garvey
- (England) Brian Gibbs
- (Scotland) John Gilchrist
- (England) Dick Graham
- (England) David Gregory
- (England) Brian Hall
- (England) Bobby Hunt
- (Scotland) Chris Iwelumo
- (England) Kemal Izzet
- (England) Vic Keeble
- (England) Martyn King
- (Republic of Ireland) Mark Kinsella
- (Scotland) John Kurila
- (England) Steve Leslie
- (England) Brian Lewis
- (Democratic Republic of the Congo) Lomana LuaLua
- (England) Mick Mahon
- (England) Roy McDonough
- (England) Mick Packer
- (England) Dave Simmons
- (England) Graham Smith
- (England) Nicky Smith
- (England) Reg Stewart
- (Wales) Mike Walker
- (England) Peter Wright

In addition to the Hall of Fame, which excludes players who are currently active, Lomana LuaLua was named as Colchester United's cult hero by fans in a poll by the BBC in 2004, with the Congolese international registering 39% of the overall vote. He narrowly pipped Mark Kinsella who garnered 38% of the vote, while influential player-manager Roy McDonough earned 23%.

== Club officials ==
As of 16 August 2024

=== Board Members ===
- Executive Chairman: Robbie Cowling
- Directors: Steve Ball, Corin Haines, Nancy Hayes
- Life President: Peter Heard

=== First Team ===
- First Team Head Coach: Danny Cowley
- Assistant Coach: Nicky Cowley
- First Team Coach: Jonathan Duckett
- Goalkeeping Coach: Dominic Colman
- First-Team Physio: Hayden Clifton
- First Team Analyst: Jonathan Duckett
- Kit Assistant: Dean Craig

=== Academy ===
- Academy Manager: James McFarlane
- Head of Academy Coaching: Steve Ball
- Head of Player Care: Kodai Abe
- U21s Lead Coach: Elliott Ward
- U18s Lead Coach: Joe Dunne
- Academy Goalkeeping Coach: Paul Smith
- Academy Sports Scientist: Thomas Baskerville
- Academy Head of Sports Science and Medicine: Hashim Ali
- Academy Video Analyst: Zac Thornton
- Academy Video Analyst Assistant: Revanth Thakore
- Academy Physiotherapist: Ollie Reardon, Rob Kavanagh, Brianna Lawal
- Academy Psychologist: Ryan Bailey

== Honours ==
Colchester United's honours include the following:

League

- League One (level 3)
  - Runners-up: 2005–06
- Fourth Division / Third Division (level 4)
  - Runners-up: 1961–62
  - Promoted: 1965–66, 1973–74, 1976–77
  - Play-off winners: 1998
- Conference (level 5)
  - Champions: 1991–92
  - Runners-up: 1990–91
- Southern League
  - Champions: 1938–39
  - Runners-up: 1949–50

Cup

- Football League Trophy
  - Runners-up: 1996–97
- FA Trophy
  - Winners: 1991–92
- Southern League Cup
  - Winners: 1937–38, 1949–50
- Watney Cup
  - Winners: 1971
- Essex Senior Cup
  - Winners: 2009–10

== Colchester United Women F.C. ==
Initially founded in 1992 under the name of Colchester Royals, later affiliated in 1998 to Colchester United FC and eventually folding in 2013, Colchester United W.F.C. was reestablished in July 2023 in time for the upcoming season.

== Notes ==
A.: As part of the club's 75th anniversary, for the 2012–13 season, shirt sponsorship was provided by local businesses on a game-by-game basis.
