= 2025–26 Colchester United F.C. season =

89th season in existence of Colchester United FC

Colchester United
2025–26 season
- Chairman: Robbie Cowling
- Head Coach: Danny Cowley
- Stadium: Colchester Community Stadium
- League Two: 12th
- FA Cup: First round
- EFL Cup: First round
- EFL Trophy: Round of 32
- Top goalscorer: League: Jack Payne (11 goals); All: Jack Payne (11 goals)
- Highest home attendance: 6,834 vs Cambridge United (19 August 2025, League Two)
- Lowest home attendance: 1,061 vs Fulham U21 (11 November 2025, EFL Trophy GS)
- Average home league attendance: 5,034
- Biggest win: 6–2 vs Chesterfield (H) (4 October 2025, League Two)
- Biggest defeat: 0-3 vs Chesterfield (A) (3 March 2026, League Two)
Home colours	Away colours	Third colours
- All statistics correct as of match played 14 April 2026.

The 2025–26 season is the 89th season in the history of Colchester United Football Club and their tenth consecutive season in League Two. In addition to the domestic league, the club would also participate in the FA Cup, the EFL Cup, and the EFL Trophy.

== Transfers and contracts ==
=== In ===
Date	Pos.	Player	From	Fee	Ref.
	CF	(England) Jaden Williams	(England) Tottenham Hotspur	Free	
1 July 2025	DM	(England) Dominic Gape	(England) Shrewsbury Town	Free	
	CB	(England) Jack Tucker	(England) Milton Keynes Dons	Free	
9 July 2025	CM	(England) Ben Perry	(England) Nottingham Forest	Undisclosed	
11 July 2025	CF	(England) Makise Evans	(England) Stevenage	Free	
26 July 2025	LB	(Zimbabwe) Kurai Musanhi	(England) Crystal Palace	Free	
1 August 2025	LW	(Nigeria) Adrian Akande	(England) Reading	Free	
7 August 2025	CB	(England) Jack Baldwin	(England) Northampton Town	Free	
9 January 2026	CF	(England) Freddie Ingram	(England) Eastleigh	Undisclosed	
2 February 2026	CB	(England) Alex Faux	(England) Fulham	Free Transfer	

=== Out ===
Date	Pos.	Player	To	Fee	Ref.
8 July 2025	CB	(England) Ben Goodliffe	(England) Southend United	Undisclosed	
26 August 2025	RW	(England) Oscar Thorn	(England) Lincoln City	Undisclosed	

=== Loaned in ===
Date	Pos.	Player	From	Date until	Ref.
9 July 2025	CF	(England) Will Goodwin	(England) Oxford United	31 May 2026	
6 August 2025	LB	(England) Josh Powell	(England) Nottingham Forest	2 January 2026 (Note: On 2 January, Powell was recalled to his parent club Nottingham Forest)	
29 August 2025	CB	(England) Harvey Araujo	(England) Fulham	31 May 2026	
1 September 2025	CF	(England) Micah Mbick	(England) Charlton Athletic	31 May 2026	
30 January 2026	CDM	(England) Finley Barbrook	(England) Ipswich Town	31 May 2026	
31 January 2026	RB	(England) Fin Back	(England) Wycombe Wanderers	31 May 2026	
2 February 2026	CAM	(Republic of Ireland) Romeo Akachukwu	(England) Southampton	31 May 2026	

=== Loaned out ===
Date	Pos.	Player	To	Date until	Ref.
8 August 2025	CB	(Ghana) Sam Kuffour Jr.	(England) Hornchurch	26 September 2025 (Note: On 26 September, Kuffour Jr. was recalled from his half-season loan at Hornchurch.)	
8 August 2025	CB	(England) Frankie Terry	(England) Braintree Town	11 December 2025 (Note: On 11 December, Terry was recalled from his loan at Braintree)	
26 September 2025	CB	(England) Frankie Edwards	(England) Hornchurch	23 October 2025	
26 September 2025	CDM	(England) Max Jolliffe	(England) Billericay Town	23 October 2025	
23 October 2025	CDM	(England) Max Jolliffe	(England) Yeovil Town	31 January 2026 (Note: On 31 January, Jolliffe was recalled from his season-long loan at Yeovil and subsequently joined Salisbury on loan)	
6 December 2025	CDM	(England) Ronnie Harvey	(England) Chelmsford City	3 January 2026	
20 December 2025	LW	(Colombia) Dwayne Campina Do Vale	(England) Carshalton Athletic	17 January 2026	
20 December 2025	CF	(England) Makise Evans	(England) Bishop's Stortford	17 January 2026	
20 December 2025	RW	(England) Owen Moore	(England) Concord Rangers	17 January 2026	
20 December 2025	CB	(England) Herbie Shaw	(England) Takeley	17 January 2026	
24 December 2025	CB	(England) Fela Abidekun	(England) Grays Athletic	21 January 2026	
24 December 2025	CDM	(England) Daniel Banjoko	(England) White Ensign	21 January 2026	
24 December 2025	CF	(England) Leo Makatta	(England) Heybridge Swifts	21 January 2026	
24 December 2025	CF	(England) James Sasere	(England) Grays Athletic	21 January 2026	
24 December 2025	GK	(England) Jack Sexton	(England) White Ensign	21 January 2026	
31 January 2026	CDM	(England) Max Jolliffe	(England) Salisbury	31 May 2026	
4 February 2026	RB	(England) David Nkrumah	(England) Stowmarket Town	28 February 2026	
7 February 2026	CF	(England) Kien Connolly	(England) Dagenham & Redbridge	7 March 2026	
28 February 2026	LW	(Nigeria) Adrian Akande	(England) Braintree Town	28 March 2026	
27 March 2026	CB	(England) Jack Baldwin	(England) Eastleigh	31 May 2026	
27 March 2026	CF	(England) Kien Connolly	(England) Dagenham & Redbridge	31 May 2026	
27 March 2026	LW	(England) John-Kymani Gordon	(England) Rochdale	31 May 2026	
27 March 2026	CDM	(England) Ronnie Harvey	(England) Salisbury	31 May 2026	
27 March 2026	CDM	(England) Milton Oni	(England) Hornchurch	31 May 2026	

=== Released / Out of Contract ===
Date	Pos.	Player	Subsequent club	Join date	Ref.
30 June 2025	CB	(Republic of Ireland) Fiacre Kelleher	(Republic of Ireland) Cork City	1 July 2025	
30 June 2025	CM	(England) Alfie Bendle	(England) Spalding United	August 2025	
30 June 2025	CF	(England) Oliver Godziemski	(England) A.F.C. Greenwich Borough	August 2025	
30 June 2025	RW	(England) Hakeem Sandah	(England) Farnborough	9 August 2025	
30 June 2025	CF	(Montserrat) Lyle Taylor	(England) Chelmsford City	7 August 2025	

=== New Contract ===
Date	Pos.	Player	Contract until	Ref.
24 June 2025	RB	(England) Elkanah Akor	30 June 2026 (Note: First professional contract) (Note: Club option for a further year)	
24 June 2025	CB	(England) Alfie Newby	30 June 2026	
24 June 2025	AM	(England) Kai Martin	30 June 2026	
8 July 2025	CB	(Northern Ireland) Tom Flanagan	30 June 2026	
26 July 2025	LW	(England) Kaion Lisbie	Undisclosed	
31 July 2025	CB	(England) Frankie Terry	30 June 2027	
1 August 2025	RB	(Grenada) Kane Vincent-Young	30 June 2026	

== Pre-season and friendlies ==
On 12 June, Colchester United announced two pre-season fixtures, against Maldon & Tiptree and Dagenham & Redbridge. Five days later, a third friendly was confirmed against Peterborough United.

Win Draw Loss Fixtures

12 July 2025 Friendly	Maldon & Tiptree	0–3	Colchester United	Maldon
15:00 BST		Report	Bishop 19'; Edwards 41'; Anderson 87'	Stadium: Park Drive

15 July 2025 Friendly	Luton Town	4-1	Colchester United	Luton
	Richards 40'; Nordas 55'; Wells 64'; Alli 80'	Report	Williams 62'	Stadium: The Brache (Luton Training Ground); Attendance: 0
Note: 2 x 60 minute games

22 July 2025 Friendly	Dagenham & Redbridge	0-5	Colchester United	Dagenham
19:30 BST			Goodwin 7'; Goodwin 36'; Bishop 45'; Adrian Akande 69' (Trialist); Tovide 88'	Stadium: Victoria Road

25 July 2025 Friendly	Colchester United	2–2	Peterborough United	Colchester
19:00 BST	Williams 29'; Tovide 68'	Report	Hughes 20'; Frith 27'	Stadium: Colchester Community Stadium

29 July 2025 Friendly	Ipswich Town	0–1	Colchester United	Rushmere St Andrew
13:00 BST		Report	Read (?)	Stadium: Playford Road; Attendance: 0 (behind-closed-doors)

== Competitions ==
=== League Two ===
==== League table ====
Pos	Team	Pld	W	D	L	GF	GA	GD	Pts
10	Oldham Athletic	46	18	14	14	60	44	+16	68
11	Crewe Alexandra	46	19	10	17	64	58	+6	67
12	Colchester United	46	18	12	16	62	49	+13	66
13	Walsall	46	18	11	17	56	56	0	65
14	Bristol Rovers	46	19	5	22	56	65	−9	62

Source: EFL Official Website
Rules for classification: 1) Points; 2) Goal difference; 3) Number of goals scored; 4) Head-to-head results; 5) Wins; 6) Away goals; 7) Penalty points (sec 9.5); 8) 12-point sending off offences

==== Results summary ====
Overall								Home						Away					
Pld	W	D	L	GF	GA	GD	Pts	W	D	L	GF	GA	GD	W	D	L	GF	GA	GD
46	18	12	16	62	49	+13	66	10	6	7	35	23	+12	8	6	9	27	26	+1

Last updated: complete.
Source: Soccerway

==== Results by round ====
Round	1	2	3	4	5	6	7	8	9	10	11	12	13	14	15	16	17	18	19	20	21	22	23	24	27	28	29	30	31	32	33	34	35	26^{2}	36	37	38	39	40	41	42	43	25^{2}	44	45	46
Ground	H	A	A	H	H	A	H	A	H	A	H	A	H	A	H	A	A	H	H	A	H	A	A	H	A	H	H	A	H	A	A	H	H	A	A	H	A	A	H	H	A	H	H	A	H	A
Result	D	D	W	L	L	D	D	L	D	L	W	W	W	D	L	W	W	W	D	L	W	D	D	W	W	W	L	L	W	L	D	W	L	L	W	D	L	L	D	L	W	W	W	L	L	W
Position	9	15	10	14	17	17	16	19	20	20	19	16	14	14	16	14	13	10	9	12	11	10	10	9	9	8	10	11	11	12	12	10	12	12	12	11	13	14	14	14	13	13	12	13	13	12
Points	1	2	5	5	5	6	7	7	8	8	11	14	17	18	18	21	24	27	28	28	31	32	33	36	39	42	42	42	45	45	46	49	49	49	52	53	53	53	54	54	57	60	63	63	63	66

Source: EFL
A = Away; H = Home; W = Win; D = Draw; L = Loss; P = Postponed
Notes:
- ^{1} Matchday 25 (vs. Accrington Stanley) was postponed due to a frozen pitch.
- ^{2} Matchday 26 (vs. Chesterfield) was postponed due to a frozen pitch.

==== Matches ====
On 26 June the League Two fixtures were revealed.

Win Draw Loss Fixtures

2 August 2025 1	Colchester United	1–1	Tranmere Rovers	Colchester
15:00 BST	Anderson (yellow card) 22'; Lisbie (yellow card) 69', (goal) 87'	Report	Jennings 15'; Kenneh (yellow card) 79'; Solomon (yellow card) 89'	Stadium: Colchester Community Stadium; Attendance: 5,981; Referee: David Rock

9 August 2025 2	Oldham Athletic	1–1	Colchester United	Oldham
15:00 BST	Hawkes 36'; Conlon (yellow card) 89'	Report	Tucker 8'; Macey (yellow card) 34'	Stadium: Boundary Park; Attendance: 7,799; Referee: Craig Hicks

16 August 2025 3	Shrewsbury Town	0–2	Colchester United	Shrewsbury
15:00 BST	Boyle (yellow card) 22'; McDermott (red card) 65'; Perry (yellow card) 79'	Report	Tovide 57'; Payne (yellow card) 70'; Lisbie 83'	Stadium: New Meadow; Referee: Michael Barlow

19 August 2025 4	Colchester United	1–2	Cambridge United	Colchester
19:45 BST	Read 13'; Payne (yellow card) 44'; Tovide (yellow card) 67'	Report	Jobe (yellow card) 39', (goal) 45+2'; Brophy 45'; Ball (yellow card) 56'; Watts (yellow card) 68'; Bennett (yellow card) 90+3'	Stadium: Colchester Community Stadium; Attendance: 6,834; Referee: Richard Eley

23 August 2025 5	Colchester United	0–2	Barrow	Colchester
15:00 BST	Payne (yellow card) 14'; Lisbie (yellow card) 90+1'	Report	Earing 9'; Booty (yellow card) 14'; Raglan (yellow card) 45'; Barkhuizen (yellow card) 71'; Shipley 72'	Stadium: Colchester Community Stadium; Attendance: 4,512; Referee: Aaron Bannister

30 August 2025 6	Barnet	1–1	Colchester United	Edgware
15:00 BST	Glover (yellow card) 39'; Collinge 90'; Senior (yellow card) 90+5'	Report	Tucker 9'	Stadium: The Hive Stadium; Attendance: 3,098; Referee: Tom Reeves

6 September 2025 7	Colchester United	1–1	Crewe Alexandra	Colchester
15:00 BST	Hunt (yellow card) 59'; Lisbie 66'; Tucker (yellow card) 90+6'	Report	Golding (yellow card) 18'; O'Reilly (yellow card) 19'; March 39'; Hutchinson (yellow card) 65'; Connolly (yellow card) 90+2'	Stadium: Colchester Community Stadium; Attendance: 4,572; Referee: Greg Rollason

13 September 2025 8	Accrington Stanley	1–0	Colchester United	Accrington
12:30 BST	Smith (yellow card) 30'; Sinclair 32'; Love (yellow card) 70'	Report	Araujo (yellow card) 45+3'; Gape (yellow card) 60'; Williams (yellow card) 70'; Edwards (red card) 86'	Stadium: Crown Ground; Attendance: 2,107 (199 U's fans); Referee: Martin Coy
Note: Fixture was originally scheduled for a 15:00 kick-off, but was moved live Sky Sports broadcasting.

20 September 2025 9	Colchester United	1–1	Bristol Rovers	Colchester
15:00 BST	Smith (yellow card) 21'; Mbick 52'; Read (yellow card) 79'	Report	Cavegn 40'; Thomas (yellow card) 43'; Harrison (yellow card) 45+3'; Cotterill (yellow card) 59'; Łopata (yellow card) 79'; McEachran (yellow card) 83'	Stadium: Colchester Community Stadium; Attendance: 5,050; Referee: Abigail Byrne

27 September 2025 10	Fleetwood Town	4–2	Colchester United	Fleetwood
15:00 BST	Ennis 30'; Davies 55', 87'; Helm 90+2'	Report	Lisbie 3'; Payne 39' (pen.)	Stadium: Highbury Stadium; Attendance: 2,298 (151 away fans); Referee: Edward Duckworth

4 October 2026 11	Colchester United	6–2	Chesterfield	Colchester
15:00 BST	Anderson 5', 90+6'; Payne 13', 45+5', 45+5' (pen.); Vincent-Young (yellow card) 22'; Lisbie 68'	Report	Mandeville 20'; Dobra (yellow card) 45+1'; Berry 81'	Stadium: Colchester Community Stadium; Attendance: 4,879; Referee: Lee Swabey

11 October 2025 12	Grimsby Town	1–2	Colchester United	Cleethorpes
15:00 BST	Green 17', (yellow card) 86'; McEachran (yellow card) 25'; Khouri (yellow card) 27'	Report	Tucker (yellow card) 27'; Payne (yellow card) 33'; Iandolo (yellow card) 35'; Mbick 38', 60'; Read (yellow card) 50'	Stadium: Blundell Park; Referee: James Bell

18 October 2025 13	Colchester United	3–1	Harrogate Town	Colchester
15:00 BST	Anderson 14', 21', 45+2'; Iandolo (yellow card) 37'	Report	Duke-McKenna 3'; Muldoon (yellow card) 45+6'; Fox (yellow card) 47'; Slater (yellow card) 72'	Stadium: Colchester Community Stadium; Attendance: 4,913; Referee: Seb Stockbrige

25 October 2025 14	Swindon Town	0–0	Colchester United	Swindon
15:00 BST	Wilson-Brown (yellow card) 62'	Report		Stadium: County Ground; Attendance: 8,542; Referee: Leigh Doughty

8 November 2025 15	Colchester United	0–2	Bromley	Colchester
12:30 GMT	Iandolo (yellow card) 31'; Read (yellow card) 81'	Report	Hondermarck (yellow card) 55'; Ifill (yellow card) 60'; Sowunmi 74'; Cheek 78'; Kabamba (yellow card) 86'	Stadium: Colchester Community Stadium; Attendance: 5,169; Referee: Andrew Humphries

15 November 2025 16	Walsall	0–2	Colchester United	Bescot
15:00 GMT	Barrett (yellow card) 58'; Weir (yellow card) 61'	Report	Bishop (yellow card) 19'; Tovide 21'; Iandolo (yellow card) 24'; Lisbie 42'; Macey (yellow card) 83'; Flanagan (yellow card) 90+2'	Stadium: Bescot Stadium; Attendance: 6,251; Referee: James Durkin

22 November 2025 17	Notts County	1–3	Colchester United	Nottingham
15:00 GMT	Vincent-Young 7' (o.g.); Robertson (yellow card) 45'	Report	Anderson 14'; Lisbie (yellow card) 28'; Mbick 56'; Read (yellow card) 59'; Vincent-Young (yellow card) 81'; Goodwin 90+5'	Stadium: Meadow Lane; Attendance: 9,477; Referee: Simon Mather

29 November 2025 18	Colchester United	2–0	Cheltenham Town	Colchester
15:00 GMT	Lisbie 8'; Mbick 50'	Report		Stadium: Colchester Community Stadium; Attendance: 4,684; Referee: Elliott Bell

6 December 2025 19	Colchester United	0–0	Gillingham	Colchester
12:30 GMT	Gape (yellow card) 90+4'	Report	Rowe (yellow card) 9'; Hutton (yellow card) 24'; Gale (yellow card) 77'; Ogie (yellow card) 90+3'	Stadium: Colchester Community Stadium; Attendance: 4,832; Referee: Oliver Mackey
Note: Fixture was initially scheduled for 9 December, but both clubs were in agreement to bring it forward as both were knocked out of the FA Cup.

13 December 2025 20	Salford City	4–3	Colchester United	Kersal
12:30 GMT	Mnoga (yellow card) 9'; Harris 11'; Oluwo 59'; Borini 75' (pen.); Garbutt 90+2', (yellow card) 90+3'; Cesay (yellow card) 90+7'	Report	Anderson 8'; Iandolo 51'; Read 55'	Stadium: Moor Lane; Attendance: 2,536; Referee: Scott Oldham

20 December 2025 21	Colchester United	4–1	Newport County	Colchester
15:00 GMT	Lisbie 22'; Tovide 43'; Mbick 64'; Iandolo (yellow card) 78'; Payne 90+6'	Report	Smith (yellow card) 2'; Evans (yellow card) 31'; Braybrooke 66'	Stadium: Colchester Community Stadium; Attendance: 4,717; Referee: Harry Wager

26 December 2025 22	Crawley Town	1–1	Colchester United	Crawley
15:00 GMT	Brown 13'; Williams (yellow card) 68'; Watson (yellow card) 90+3'	Report	Lisbie 20'; Tovide (yellow card) 31'; Mbick (yellow card) 57'	Stadium: Broadfield Stadium; Attendance: 3,993; Referee: Alan Young

29 December 2025 23	Gillingham	1–1	Colchester United	Gillingham
15:00 GMT	McKenzie 74'; Little (yellow card) 86'	Report	Lisbie (yellow card) 77'; Read 87' (pen.)	Stadium: Priestfield Stadium; Attendance: 7,284; Referee: Matthew Russell

1 January 2026 24	Colchester United	1–0	Milton Keynes Dons	Colchester
15:00 GMT	Payne 90+4' (pen.), (yellow card) 90+5'	Report	Offord (yellow card) 60'; Leko (yellow card) 90'	Stadium: Colchester Community Stadium; Attendance: 6,404; Referee: Stephen Parkinson

17 January 2026 27	Bristol Rovers	0–1	Colchester United	Horfield
15:00 GMT	Senior (yellow card) 28'; Kilgour (yellow card) 73'; Sparkes (yellow card) 89'; Lockyer (yellow card) 90+3'	Report	Hunt (yellow card) 61'; Edwards 85'; Mbick (yellow card) 90+8'	Stadium: Memorial Stadium; Attendance: 7,556; Referee: Ben Toner

24 January 2026 28	Colchester United	2–1	Fleetwood Town	Colchester
15:00 GMT	Lisbie 14'; Mbick 38'; Gape (yellow card) 88'; Goodwin (yellow card) 90+7'; Edwards (yellow card) 90+8'	Report	Bonds (yellow card) 72'; Ennis 79'; Powell (yellow card) 80'	Stadium: Colchester Community Stadium; Attendance: 4,994; Referee: Charles Breakspear

27 January 2026 29	Colchester United	0–1	Grimsby Town	Colchester
19:45 GMT	Tovide (yellow card) 56'; Lisbie (yellow card) 81'; Araujo (yellow card) 90+10'	Report	Rodgers 38'; Green (yellow card) 61' (yellow-red card) 66'; Cook (yellow card) 75'	Stadium: Colchester Community Stadium; Attendance: 4,237; Referee: Ben Atkinson

31 January 2026 30	Crewe Alexandra	1–0	Colchester United	Crewe
15:00 GMT	Agius 68'	Report	Gape (yellow card) 49'; Back (yellow card) 74'; Payne (yellow card) 90+5'	Stadium: Gresty Road; Attendance: 4,776; Referee: Seb Stockbridge

7 February 2026 31	Colchester United	2–0	Shrewsbury Town	Colchester
15:00 GMT	Goodwin 4'; Read 37'; Lisbie (yellow card) 53'; Hunt (yellow card) 78'; Macey (yellow card) 84'; Vincent-Young (yellow card) 90'	Report	Freeman (yellow card) 10'; Ruffels (yellow card) 54'	Stadium: Colchester Community Stadium; Attendance: 4,932; Referee: James Oldham

14 February 2026 32	Barrow	1–0	Colchester United	Barrow-in-Furness
15:00 GMT	Canavan (yellow card) 49', (goal) 85'; Thompson (yellow card) 69'	Report	Tovide (yellow card) 30'; Araujo (yellow card) 90+4'; Vincent-Young (yellow card) 90+4'	Stadium: Holker Street; Attendance: 2,321; Referee: Peter Wright

17 February 2026 33	Cambridge United	1–1	Colchester United	Cambridge
19:45 GMT	Watts 3'; Purrington (yellow card) 43'; Gibbons (yellow card) 84'	Report	Bishop (yellow card) 22'; Payne 30'; Read (yellow card) 90+5'	Stadium: Abbey Stadium; Attendance: 6,764; Referee: Declan Brown

21 February 2026 34	Colchester United	4–1	Barnet	Colchester
15:00 GMT	Tovide (yellow card) 26'; Read 39'; Goodwin (yellow card) 64'; Payne 75' (pen.), 77', 90+4'	Report	Kizzi (yellow card) 31'; Ofoborh 45+1'; Hawkins (yellow card) 78'; Chinedu (yellow card) 90+6'	Stadium: Colchester Community Stadium; Attendance: 5,195; Referee: Alex Chilowicz

28 February 2026 35	Colchester United	0–1	Salford City	Colchester
15:00 GMT	Goodwin (yellow card) 37'; Read (yellow card) 41'; Back (yellow card) 43'	Report	Longelo (yellow card) 31'; Stockton 78'; Austerfield (yellow card) 87'	Stadium: Colchester Community Stadium; Attendance: 3,674; Referee: Ross Martin

3 March 2026 26	Chesterfield	3–0	Colchester United	Chesterfield
19:45 GMT	Grigg 26' (pen.); Markanday 39'; McFadzean (yellow card) 61'; Bonis 72'; Donacien (yellow card) 90+2'	Report	Bishop (yellow card) 24'; Tucker (yellow card) 30'; Araujo (yellow card) 87'; Gordon (yellow card) 90+3'	Stadium: SMH Group Stadium; Attendance: 7,348; Referee: Simon Mather
Note: Fixture was originally scheduled for 10 January, but it was postponed due to a frozen pitch.

7 March 2026 36	Newport County	1–2	Colchester United	Newport
15:00 GMT	Jenkins 90+7'	Report	Anderson 58'; Payne 64'	Stadium: Rodney Parade; Attendance: 4,328 (inc. 302 U's fans); Referee: Steven Copeland

13 March 2026 37	Colchester United	0–0	Crawley Town	Colchester
19:45 GMT		Report	Malone (yellow card) 10'; Barker (yellow card) 25'; Richards (yellow card) 44'; Russell (yellow card) 57'; Forster (yellow card) 90'; Bajrami (yellow card) 90+3'	Stadium: Colchester Community Stadium; Attendance: 5,167; Referee: Will Finnie

18 March 2026 38	Milton Keynes Dons	1–0	Colchester United	Denbigh
20:00 GMT	Macey 39' (o.g.); Crowley (yellow card) 44'; Sanders (yellow card) 52'	Report	Lisbie (yellow card) 13'; Tovide (yellow card) 19'; Flanagan (yellow card) 72'; Payne (yellow card) 79'	Stadium: Stadium MK; Attendance: 6,285; Referee: Sam Mulhall
Note: Fixture was initially scheduled for 17 March, but was rearranged for Sky Sports broadcasting.

21 March 2026 39	Bromley	1–0	Colchester United	Bromley
15:00 GMT	Kabamba 73'; Ajayi (yellow card) 86'; Hondermarck (yellow card) 90+3'	Report	Flanagan (yellow card) 55'; Iandolo (yellow card) 65'; Tovide (yellow card) 84'	Stadium: Hayes Lane; Attendance: 4,722; Referee: Oliver Yates

28 March 2026 40	Colchester United	1–1	Walsall	Colchester
15:00 GMT	Read (yellow card) 63'; Anderson 68'; Iandolo (yellow card) 89'	Report	Burke 64'	Stadium: Colchester Community Stadium; Attendance: 4,904; Referee: Carl Brook

3 April 2026 41	Colchester United	1–3	Oldham Athletic	Colchester
15:00 BST	Lisbie 53', (yellow card) 90+2'	Report	Daniels 8'; Woods (yellow card) 42'; Leake (yellow card) 79'; Taylor 86'; Drummond 90+4'	Stadium: Colchester Community Stadium; Attendance: 5,621; Referee: Scott Jackson

6 April 2026 42	Tranmere Rovers	0–1	Colchester United	Birkenhead
15:00 BST	Tamen (yellow card) 68'	Report	Read (yellow card) 28'; Payne 75'	Stadium: Prenton Park; Attendance: 6,211; Referee: Scott Oldham

10 April 2025 43	Colchester United	3–0	Swindon Town	Colchester
19:45 BST	Read 48'; Goodwin 54'; Iandolo (yellow card) 63'; Anderson 69'	Report	Ball (red card) 29'	Stadium: Colchester Community Stadium; Attendance: 4,880; Referee: Paul Howard
Note: Fixture was originally scheduled for 11 April, but was to the night prior following an agreement between the two sides.

14 April 2026 25	Colchester United	2–1	Accrington Stanley	Colchester
19:45 BST	Goodwin (yellow card) 28', (goal) 43'; Read (yellow card) 31'; Hunt (yellow card) 72'; Payne 86'; Tucker (yellow card) 90+7'	Report	Whalley 33'; Woods (yellow card) 63'	Stadium: Colchester Community Stadium; Attendance: 4,298; Referee: Jacob Miles
Note: Fixture was originally scheduled for 4 January, but it was postponed due to a frozen pitch.

18 April 2026 44	Harrogate Town	1–0	Colchester United	Harrogate
15:00 BST	Bennett (yellow card) 35'; Evans (yellow card) 46', (goal) 90+9'; Hill (yellow card) 48'; Brenan (yellow card) 76'	Report	Lisbie (yellow card) 87'	Stadium: Wetherby Road; Attendance: 3,030; Referee: Martin Coy

25 April 2026 45	Colchester United	0–1	Notts County	Colchester
15:00 BST	Vincent-Young (yellow card) 45+1'; Barbrook (yellow card) 52'; Read (yellow card) 70'	Report	Tsaroulla 47', (yellow card) 76'; Grant (yellow card) 61'; Robertson (yellow card) 75'	Stadium: Colchester Community Stadium; Attendance: 6,932; Referee: Charles Breakspear

2 May 2026 46	Cheltenham Town	1–4	Colchester United	Cheltenham
15:00 BST	Young (yellow card) 5'; Miller 55'	Report	Tovide 3'; Read 23'; Anderson 31'; Edwards (yellow card) 74'; Barbrook 90'	Stadium: Whaddon Road; Attendance: 4,562 (541 away); Referee: Tom Reeves

=== FA Cup ===
Colchester were drawn at home to Milton Keynes Dons in the first round.

Win Draw Loss Fixtures

1 November 2025 First round	Colchester United	2–3	Milton Keynes Dons	Colchester
15:00 GMT	Mbick 26', (yellow card) 90+4'; Anderson 48'; Read (yellow card) 52'	Report	Hepburn-Murphy 37', 58'; Mellish (yellow card) 40'; Ekpiteta (yellow card) 45+1'; Offord (yellow card) 66'; Tomlinson 87'; Thompson-Summers (yellow card) 90+1'	Stadium: Colchester Community Stadium; Attendance: 3,639; Referee: Abigail Byrne

=== EFL Cup ===
Win Draw Loss Fixtures

12 August 2025 First round	Oxford United	1–0	Colchester United	Littlemore
19:45 BST	Goodrham 9'; Brannagan (yellow card) 83'; Harris (yellow card) 89'; Spencer (yellow card) 90+1'	Report	Perry (yellow card) 58'; Tovide (yellow card) 83'; Lisbie (yellow card) 90+2'	Stadium: Kassam Stadium; Attendance: 3,452; Referee: Jacob Miles

=== EFL Trophy ===
Colchester were drawn against Gillingham, Wycombe Wanderers and Fulham U21 in the group stage. After winning the group, The U's were drawn at home to West Ham United U21 in the round of 32.

Pos	Div	Team	Pld	W	PW	PL	L	GF	GA	GD	Pts	Qualification
1	L2	Colchester United	3	3	0	0	0	6	2	+4	9	Advance to Round 2
2	L1	Wycombe Wanderers	3	2	0	0	1	7	3	+4	6	Advance to Round 2
3	L2	Gillingham	3	1	0	0	2	5	6	−1	3	
4	ACA	Fulham U21	3	0	0	0	3	2	9	−7	0	

Source: EFL

Win Draw Loss Fixtures

2 September 2025 Group G	Wycombe Wanderers	1-2	Colchester United	High Wycombe
19:00 BST			Williams, Tucker	Stadium: Adams Park

7 October 2025 Group G	Colchester United	2–1	Gillingam	Colchester
19:45 BST	Mbick 85'; Read 90+2' (pen.); Harvey (yellow card) 90+7'	Report	Vokes 15'; Clark (yellow card) 49'; Cirino (yellow card) 71' (yellow-red card) 87'; Waldock (yellow card) 80'	Stadium: Colchester Community Stadium; Attendance: 1,467; Referee: Carl Brook

11 November 2025 Group G	Colchester United	2–0	Fulham U21	Colchester
19:45 GMT	Goodwin (yellow card) 44'; Williams (penalty missed) 58'; Flanagan (yellow card) 59'; Tovide 80'; Tucker 88'	Report	White (yellow card) 57'	Stadium: Colchester Community Stadium; Attendance: 1,061; Referee: Isaac Searle

9 December 2025 Round of 32	Colchester United	0–1	West Ham United U21	Colchester
19:45 GMT	Harvey (yellow card) 38'	Report	Earthy 17', (yellow card) 90'; Kanté (yellow card) 68'; Fearon (yellow card) 88'	Stadium: Colchester Community Stadium; Attendance: 3,913; Referee: Richie Watkins

== Statistics ==
=== Appearances and goals ===
Players with no appearances are not included on the list; italics indicate loaned in player

No.	Pos	Nat	Player	Total		League Two		FA Cup		EFL Cup		EFL Trophy	
No.	Pos	Nat	Player	Apps	Goals	Apps	Goals	Apps	Goals	Apps	Goals	Apps	Goals
1	GK	(England) ENG	Matt Macey	47	0	45+0	0	1+0	0	1+0	0	0+0	0
2	DF	(England) ENG	Rob Hunt	43	0	29+10	0	0+0	0	0+0	0	3+1	0
3	DF	(England) ENG	Ellis Iandolo	22	1	21+0	1	1+0	0	0+0	0	0+0	0
4	MF	(England) ENG	Ben Perry	4	0	3+0	0	0+0	0	1+0	0	0+0	0
5	DF	(England) ENG	Jack Tucker	52	4	46+0	2	1+0	0	1+0	0	2+2	2
6	DF	(Northern Ireland) NIR	Tom Flanagan	17	0	14+1	0	0+0	0	1+0	0	1+0	0
7	FW	(England) ENG	Harry Anderson	36	12	31+2	11	1+0	1	0+0	0	0+2	0
8	MF	(England) ENG	Teddy Bishop	37	0	32+3	0	1+0	0	0+0	0	1+0	0
9	FW	(England) ENG	Samson Tovide	47	5	28+14	4	0+1	0	0+1	0	1+2	1
10	MF	(England) ENG	Jack Payne	42	13	34+5	13	0+0	0	1+0	0	2+0	0
11	FW	(England) ENG	John-Kymani Gordon	19	0	2+13	0	0+0	0	1+0	0	3+0	0
12	GK	(England) ENG	Tom Smith	7	0	1+2	0	0+0	0	0+0	0	4+0	0
14	FW	(England) ENG	Kyreece Lisbie	51	11	33+12	11	1+0	0	0+1	0	2+2	0
15	MF	(England) ENG	Dominic Gape	12	0	2+8	0	0+0	0	0+0	0	2+0	0
16	MF	(England) ENG	Arthur Read	51	8	41+4	7	1+0	0	1+0	0	0+4	1
17	FW	(England) ENG	Jaden Williams	41	1	5+30	0	1+0	0	1+0	0	4+0	1
19	FW	(England) ENG	Will Goodwin	30	4	12+16	4	0+0	0	0+0	0	2+0	0
20	DF	(England) ENG	Jack Baldwin	3	0	1+1	0	0+0	0	0+0	0	1+0	0
21	FW	(England) ENG	Owura Edwards	41	1	15+21	1	0+1	0	0+1	0	2+1	0
22	DF	(England) ENG	Fin Back	5	0	3+2	0	0+0	0	0+0	0	0+0	0
23	FW	(Nigeria) NGR	Adrian Akande	9	0	1+6	0	0+0	0	1+0	0	1+0	0
24	DF	(England) ENG	Harvey Araujo	31	0	27+1	0	1+0	0	0+0	0	1+1	0
25	MF	(England) ENG	Finley Barbrook	16	1	7+9	1	0+0	0	0+0	0	0+0	0
27	MF	(Republic of Ireland) IRL	Romeo Akachukwu	15	0	3+12	0	0+0	0	0+0	0	0+0	0
30	DF	(Grenada) GRN	Kane Vincent-Young	41	0	33+5	0	1+0	0	1+0	0	1+0	0
33	FW	(England) ENG	Micah Mbick	25	9	17+5	7	1+0	1	0+0	0	0+2	1
34	FW	(England) ENG	Kaion Lisbie	1	0	0+0	0	0+0	0	0+0	0	0+1	0
40	DF	(England) ENG	Frankie Terry	15	0	11+4	0	0+0	0	0+0	0	0+0	0
41	MF	(England) ENG	Max Jolliffe	1	0	0+1	0	0+0	0	0+0	0	0+0	0
42	MF	(England) ENG	Milton Oni	2	0	0+0	0	0+0	0	0+0	0	1+1	0
44	DF	(Ghana) GHA	Samuel Kuffour Jr.	8	0	1+4	0	0+0	0	0+0	0	3+0	0
47	MF	(England) ENG	Ronnie Harvey	5	0	0+1	0	0+0	0	0+1	0	3+0	0
Players who featured but departed the club during the season:
18	FW	(England) ENG	Oscar Thorn	5	0	2+2	0	0+0	0	0+1	0	0+0	0
26	DF	(England) ENG	Josh Powell	14	0	6+3	0	0+0	0	1+0	0	4+0	0
