= Luka Lynch =

English association football player (born 2007)

Personal information
- Full name: Luka John Lynch
- Date of birth: 11 January 2007 (age 19)
- Place of birth: England
- Position: Winger

Team information
- Current team: Oxford United (on loan from Aston Villa)
- Number: 20

Youth career
- –2022: West Bromwich Albion
- 2022–2026: Aston Villa

Senior career*
Years	Team	Apps	(Gls)
2026–	Aston Villa	0	(0)
2026–	→ Oxford United (loan)	6	(1)
- * Club domestic league appearances and goals as of 10:22 (UTC), 26 October 2026

Luka John Lynch (born 11 January 2007) is an English professional footballer who plays as a winger for EFL League One club Oxford United, on loan from Premier League club Aston Villa.

Lynch started football with the West Bromwich Albion academy, before moving to Aston Villa aged 14.

== Club career ==
Since joining Aston Villa's academy aged 14, Lynch has played for various youth levels, playing in all three positions behind the striker.

Lynch made his first appearance for the Aston Villa senior team on 27 March 2026, in a mid-season friendly with Elche.

In the summer of 2026, Lynch caught attention for his performances and goals in pre-season friendlies against Walsall and Porto. These performances earned himself a place on the bench for the 2026 UEFA Super Cup match against Paris Saint-Germain, where he was an unused substitute.

On 1 September 2026, Lynch signed for EFL League One club Oxford United on loan until January 2027. He made his English Football League debut on 5 September in a 4–0 away victory against Leicester City, where he provided an assist for Jamie McDonnell's goal. He scored his first professional goal on 15 October 2026, a long-range goal in a 1–1 league draw against Mansfield Town.

== Career statistics ==
As of match played 24 October 2026

Appearances and goals by club, season and competition
Club	Season	League			National cup		League cup		Europe		Other		Total	
Club	Season	Division	Apps	Goals	Apps	Goals	Apps	Goals	Apps	Goals	Apps	Goals	Apps	Goals
Aston Villa U21s	2024–25	—									1 (Note: Appearance(s) in EFL Trophy)	0	1	0
Aston Villa U21s	Total		—								1	0	1	0
Aston Villa	2026–27	Premier League	0	0	0	0	0	0	0	0	0	0	0	0
Oxford United (loan)	2026–27	EFL League One	6	1	0	0	–		–		1	0	7	1
Career total			6	1	0	0	0	0	0	0	1	0	7	1
