= 2024–25 Colchester United F.C. season =

88th season in existence of Colchester United FC

Colchester United
2024–25 season
- Chairman: Robbie Cowling
- Head Coach: Danny Cowley
- Stadium: Colchester Community Stadium
- League Two: 10th
- FA Cup: First round
- EFL Cup: Second round
- EFL Trophy: Round of 16
- Top goalscorer: League: Lyle Taylor (10); All: Lyle Taylor (13)

The 2024–25 season was the 88th season in the history of Colchester United Football Club and their ninth consecutive season in League Two. In addition to the domestic league, the club would also participate in the FA Cup, the EFL Cup, and the EFL Trophy.

== Transfers ==
=== In ===
Date	Pos.	Player	From	Fee	Ref.
28 June 2024	CB	Ben Goodliffe (ENG)	Sutton United (ENG)	Undisclosed	
1 July 2024 (Note: The transfer was announced on 13 June, and would become official on 1 July once his Stevenage contract expired)	RW	Harry Anderson (ENG)	Stevenage (ENG)	Free	
1 July 2024 (Note: The transfer was announced on 6 June, and would become official on 1 July once his Grays Athletic contract expired)	CF	Kien Connolly (ENG) (Note: Signed initially for the Development squad)	Grays Athletic (ENG)	Free	
1 July 2024 (Note: The transfer was announced on 28 June, and would become official on 1 July once his Crystal Palace contract expired)	CF	John-Kymani Gordon (ENG)	Crystal Palace (ENG)	Free	
1 July 2024	RB	Rob Hunt (ENG)	Leyton Orient (ENG)	Free	
1 July 2024 (Note: The transfer was announced on 31 May, and would become official on 1 July once his Portsmouth contract expired)	GK	Matt Macey (ENG)	Portsmouth (ENG)	Free	
2 July 2024	AM	Jack Payne (ENG)	Charlton Athletic (ENG)	Free	
2 July 2024	CF	Lyle Taylor (MSR)	Cambridge United (ENG)	Free	
4 July 2024	CM	Alex Woodyard (ENG)	York City (ENG)	Free	
23 July 2024	CB	Tom Flanagan (NIR)	Shrewsbury Town (ENG)	Free	
3 August 2024	CM	Alfie Bendle (ENG)	Forest Green Rovers (ENG)	Free	
7 August 2024	CM	Teddy Bishop (ENG)	Lincoln City (ENG)	Free	
4 September 2024	CM	Joel Thompson (NIR)	Nottingham Forest (ENG)	Free	
3 February 2025	RW	Kyreece Lisbie (ENG)	Brentford (ENG)	Free	
3 February 2025	RB	Kane Vincent-Young (GRN)	Wycombe Wanderers (ENG)	Free	

=== Out ===
Date	Pos.	Player	To	Fee	Ref.
14 June 2024 (Note: The transfer was announced on 3 June, and would become official on 14 June once the transfer window reopened)	RW	Jayden Fevrier (ENG)	Stockport County (ENG)	Undisclosed	
14 June 2024 (Note: The transfer was announced on 24 May, and would become official on 14 June once the transfer window reopened)	DM	Jay Mingi (ENG)	Stockport County (ENG)	Undisclosed	
1 July 2024	CB	Connor Hall (ENG)	Port Vale (ENG)	Undisclosed	
31 July 2024	AM	Noah Chilvers (ENG)	Ross County (SCO)	Undisclosed	
30 August 2024	CF	Bradley Ihionvien (ENG)	Peterborough United (ENG)	Undisclosed	

=== Loaned in ===
Date	Pos.	Player	From	Date until	Ref.
28 August 2024	CB	Aaron Donnelly (NIR)	Nottingham Forest (ENG)	8 January 2025 (Note: On 8 January, Donnelly was recalled to Nottingham Forest.)	
30 August 2024	CM	Jamie McDonnell (NIR)	Nottingham Forest (ENG)	End of season	
30 August 2024	LW	Anthony Scully (IRL)	Portsmouth (ENG)	13 January 2025 (Note: On 13 January, the club activated the break clause in Scully's loan from Portsmouth)	
20 January 2025	CF	Tyreece Simpson (ENG)	Stevenage (ENG)	End of season	
23 January 2025	CB	Jack Tucker (ENG)	Milton Keynes Dons (ENG)	End of season	
30 January 2025	CB	Michael Forbes (NIR)	West Ham United (ENG)	End of season	
3 February 2025	CF	Ken Aboh (ENG)	Norwich City (ENG)	End of season	
3 February 2025	LW	Anthony Scully (IRL)	Portsmouth (ENG)	End of season	

=== Loaned out ===
Date	Pos.	Player	To	Date until	Ref.
30 August 2024	RW	Oscar Thorn (ENG)	Chelmsford City (ENG)	1 January 2025	
6 September 2024	RB	Will Greenidge (ENG)	Hornchurch (ENG)	1 January 2025	
9 September 2024	CB	Frankie Terry (ENG)	Braintree Town (ENG)	7 October 2024	
28 October 2024	CM	Alfie Bendle (ENG)	Chelmsford City (ENG)	1 January 2025	
10 January 2025	CM	Alfie Bendle (ENG)	St Albans City (ENG)	End of season	
25 January 2025	CB	Ben Goodliffe (ENG)	Southend United (ENG)	End of season	
7 March 2025	LB	Frankie Terry (ENG)	Yeovil Town (ENG)	End of season	
10 March 2025	RW	Kyreece Lisbie (ENG)	Braintree Town (ENG)	8 April 2025	

=== Released / Out of Contract ===
Date	Pos.	Player	Subsequent club	Join date	Ref.
30 June 2024	CB	Harry Beadle (ENG)	Aveley (ENG)	1 July 2024	
30 June 2024	GK	Ted Collins (ENG)	Chelmsford City (ENG)	1 July 2024	
30 June 2024	LB	Al-Amin Kazeem (ENG)	St Patrick's Athletic (IRL)	1 July 2024	
30 June 2024	DM	Marley Marshall-Miranda (ENG)	Braintree Town (ENG)	1 July 2024	
30 June 2024	CB	Ronnie Nelson (ENG)	Tonbridge Angels (ENG)	1 July 2024	
30 June 2024	DM	Gene Kennedy (ENG)	Welling United (ENG)	3 July 2024	
30 June 2024	CM	Cameron McGeehan (NIR)	Northampton Town (ENG)	5 July 2024	
30 June 2024	DM	Ryan Lowe (ENG)	Wingate & Finchley (ENG)	13 July 2024	
30 June 2024	CB	Tom Dallison (ENG)	Ebbsfleet United (ENG)	17 July 2024	
30 June 2024	GK	Sam Hornby (ENG)	Walsall (ENG)	24 July 2024	
30 June 2024	RB	Matt Yates (ENG)	Canvey Island (ENG)	24 July 2024	
30 June 2024	CF	John Akinde (ENG)	Braintree Town (ENG)	25 July 2024	
30 June 2024	AM	Kennedy Mupomba (ENG)	Hertford Town (ENG)	2 August 2024	
30 June 2024	DM	Bayan Aman (ENG)	Hendon (ENG)	7 August 2024	
30 June 2024	AM	Donell Thomas (ENG)	Bowers & Pitsea (ENG)	28 September 2024	
30 June 2024	SS	Kaan Bennett (ENG)			
30 June 2024	LW	Taizo Marcel-Dilaver (ENG)	Walthamstow (ENG)	26 October 2024	
15 August 2024	RW	Conor Wilkinson (IRL)	Solihull Moors (ENG)	16 August 2024	
3 January 2025	DM	Alex Woodyard (ENG)	Sutton United (ENG)	3 January 2025	
23 January 2025	MF	Matt Jay (ENG)	Torquay United (ENG)	24 January 2025	
23 January 2025	RB	Will Greenidge (ENG)	Hornchurch (ENG)	23 January 2025	
28 January 2025	CF	Tom Hopper (ENG)	Southend United (ENG)	28 January 2025	

== Pre-season and friendlies ==
On 28 May, Colchester announced their first pre-season friendly, against Maldon & Tiptree. Six days later, a second fixture was confirmed, against Cambridge United. A third was later added, versus Peterborough United. On 3 and 4 July, behind closed doors friendlies against Wycombe Wanderers and Millwall respectively were also added.

Win Draw Loss Fixtures

13 July 2024 Friendly	Maldon & Tiptree	0–2	Colchester United	Maldon
15:00 BST		Report	Edwards 49'; Ihionvien 53' (pen.)	Stadium: Park Drive

20 July 2024 Friendly	Wycombe Wanderers	2–2	Colchester United	Harlington
15:00 BST	Goodliffe (o.g.); Kone	Report	Ihionvien; Jay	Stadium: Harlington Training Ground; Attendance: 0 (behind closed doors)

27 July 2024 Friendly	Peterborough United	2–1	Colchester United	Peterborough
12:30 BST	Goodliffe 24' (o.g.); 35'	Report	Taylor 23' (pen.)	Stadium: Idverde Training Ground; Attendance: 0 (behind closed doors)
Note: Fixture was initially scheduled to be played in Colchester, but was switched to Peterborough's training ground to protect the pitch.

30 July 2024 Friendly	Millwall	0–1	Colchester United	Bermondsey
13:00 BST		Report	Taylor 5'	Stadium: The Den; Attendance: 0 (behind closed doors)

3 August 2024 Friendly	Colchester United	6–0	Cambridge United	St Neots
15:00 BST	Ihionvien (x2); Iandolo; Payne; Hopper; Tovide	Report		Stadium: Rowley Park

6 August 2024 Friendly	Chelsea U21	2–1	Colchester United	Stoke d'Abernon
18:00 BST		Report	Tovide	Stadium: Cobham Training Centre; Attendance: 0 (behind closed doors)

== Competitions ==
=== League Two ===
==== League table ====
Pos	Team	Pld	W	D	L	GF	GA	GD	Pts
8	Salford City	46	18	15	13	64	54	+10	69
9	Grimsby Town	46	20	8	18	61	67	−6	68
10	Colchester United	46	16	19	11	52	47	+5	67
11	Bromley	46	17	15	14	64	59	+5	66
12	Swindon Town	46	15	17	14	71	63	+8	62

Source: EFL Official Website
Rules for classification: 1) Points; 2) Goal difference; 3) Number of goals scored; 4) Head-to-head results; 5) Wins; 6) Away goals; 7) Penalty points (sec 9.5); 8) 12-point sending off offences

==== Results summary ====
Overall								Home						Away					
Pld	W	D	L	GF	GA	GD	Pts	W	D	L	GF	GA	GD	W	D	L	GF	GA	GD
45	16	18	11	52	47	+5	66	10	7	5	28	15	+13	6	11	6	24	32	−8

Last updated: 26 April 2025.
Source: Soccerway

==== Results by round ====
Round	1	2	3	4	5	6	7	8	9	10	12	13	14	15	16	17	11^{1}	18	20	21	22	23	24	25	27	26^{3}	28	30	31	32	19^{2}	33	34	35	36	29^{4}	37	38	39	40	41	42	43	44	45	46
Ground	A	H	H	A	H	A	H	A	A	H	H	A	H	A	H	A	A	H	H	A	H	H	A	H	A	A	H	A	H	A	A	H	A	H	A	H	H	A	H	A	H	A	H	A	A	H
Result	L	W	L	D	D	D	W	L	D	D	L	D	L	D	D	W	D	W	D	D	W	D	L	L	W	D	W	W	W	D	D	D	W	W	W	W	W	L	L	D	W	W	D	L	L	D
Position	20	12	17	15	18	17	11	15	15	16	20	20	21	21	21	19	18	17	18	17	15	15	16	17	15	14	13	13	11	12	11	12	11	10	9	8	7	8	8	9	8	8	7	8	10	10
Points	0	3	3	4	5	6	9	9	10	11	11	12	12	13	14	17	18	21	22	23	26	27	27	27	30	31	34	37	40	41	42	43	46	49	52	55	58	58	58	59	62	65	66	66	66	67

Source: EFL
A = Away; H = Home; W = Win; D = Draw; L = Loss; P = Postponed
Notes:
- ^{1} Matchday 11 (vs. Fleetwood Town) was postponed due to international call-ups.
- ^{2} Matchday 19 (vs. Notts County) was postponed due to spectator and player safety concerns.
- ^{3} Matchday 26 (vs. Harrogate Town) was postponed due to Harrogate's FA Cup involvements.
- ^{4} Matchday 29 (vs. Port Vale) was postponed due to a waterlogged pitch.

==== Matches ====
On 26 June, the League Two fixtures were announced.

Win Draw Loss Fixtures

10 August 2024 1	AFC Wimbledon	4–2	Colchester United	Wimbledon
15:00 BST	Ball 13', (yellow card) 82'; Reeves 30', (yellow card) 66'; Lewis (yellow card) 35'; Stevens 38' (pen.); Bugiel 54'; Goodman (yellow card) 90+1'; Johnson (yellow card) 90+7'	Report	Goodliffe 1', 9'; Hunt (yellow card) 40'	Stadium: Plough Lane; Attendance: 7,924; Referee: Daniel Middleton

17 August 2024 2	Colchester United	2–0	Milton Keynes Dons	Colchester
15:00 BST	Flanagan (yellow card) 69'; Read 81'; Tovide (yellow card) 84'; Payne 90'	Report	Offord (yellow card) 15'; Tucker (yellow card) 27'; Gilbey (yellow card) 75'	Stadium: Colchester Community Stadium; Attendance: 4,521 (494 away); Referee: Jacob Miles

24 August 2024 3	Colchester United	0–1	Harrogate Town	Colchester
15:00 BST	Hunt (yellow card) 53'	Report	Folarin 68'; Taylor (yellow card) 72'; M. Daly (yellow card) 85'; J. Daly (yellow card) 89'	Stadium: Colchester Community Stadium; Attendance: 3,883; Referee: Craig Hicks

31 August 2024 4	Accrington Stanley	1–1	Colchester United	Accrington
15:00 BST	Awe (yellow card) 2'; Mooney 25'; Love (yellow card) 45+1'; Rawson (yellow card) 75'; O'Brien (yellow card) 75'; Walton (yellow card) 84'; Woods (yellow card) 87'	Report	Goodliffe 85'	Stadium: Crown Ground; Attendance: 1,956; Referee: Tom Reeves

7 September 2024 5	Colchester United	1–1	Bromley	Colchester
15:00 BST	Iandolo (yellow card) 22'; Egbo (yellow card) 52'; Edwards 60', (yellow card) 63'	Report	Topalloj (yellow card) 3' (yellow-red card) 90+6'; Cheek 23' (pen.), (yellow card) 27'; Odutayo (yellow card) 48'; Thompson (yellow card) 90+5'	Stadium: Colchester Community Stadium; Attendance: 4,877; Referee: Sam Purkiss

14 September 2024 6	Morecambe	3–3	Colchester United	Morecambe
15:00 BST	Tollitt 17'; Lee Angol (yellow card) 36'; Luke Hendrie (yellow card) 38' (yellow-red card) 42'; Jordan Slew (yellow card) 81'; Jones 83' (pen.); Flanagan 88' (o.g.)	Report	Edwards 43'; Tovide 49'; Taylor 64'; Egbo (yellow card) 81'	Stadium: Mazuma Mobile Stadium; Referee: Geoff Eltringham

21 September 2024 7	Colchester United	3–0	Tranmere Rovers	Colchester
15:00 BST	Taylor 7', 38'; Woodyard (yellow card) 58'; Edwards (yellow card) 64'; Tovide 78'	Report	Jennings (yellow card) 14'; Bradshaw (yellow card) 14'; Khan (yellow card) 40'; O'Connor (yellow card) 81'	Stadium: Colchester Community Stadium; Attendance: 4,243; Referee: Matthew Corlett

28 September 2024 8	Walsall	4–0	Colchester United	Bescot
12:30 BST	Jellis 39'; Barrett (yellow card) 45+1'; Adomah 79'; Earing 89', 90+2'	Report	Taylor (yellow card) 15'; Flanagan (yellow card) 21'; Woodyard (yellow card) 32'	Stadium: Bescot Stadium; Attendance: 5,140; Referee: Farai Hallam
Note: Fixture was scheduled for a 15:00 kick-off, but was moved for live Sky Sports coverage.

1 October 2024 9	Port Vale	1–1	Colchester United	Stoke-on-Trent
19:45 BST	Heneghan (yellow card) 44'; Debrah 55'; John (yellow card) 62'	Report	Read (yellow card) 34'; Woodyard (yellow card) 60'; Flanagan (yellow card) 86'; Tovide 90'; Egbo (yellow card) 92'	Stadium: Vale Park; Attendance: 4,533; Referee: Simon Mather

5 October 2024 10	Colchester United	0–0	Carlisle United	Colchester
15:00 BST	Flanagan (yellow card) 82'; McDonnell (yellow card) 82'	Report	Mellish (yellow card) 2'; Harper (yellow card) 25'; Neal (yellow card) 49'	Stadium: Colchester Community Stadium; Attendance: 4,392; Referee: Thomas Parsons

19 October 2024 12	Colchester United	1–2	Cheltenham Town	Colchester
15:00 BST	Taylor 27'; Iandolo (yellow card) 71'	Report	Thomas 5', 47'; Day (yellow card) 90'	Stadium: Colchester Community Stadium; Attendance: 4,031; Referee: Ben Speedie

22 October 2024 13	Chesterfield	1–1	Colchester United	Chesterfield
19:45 BST	Grigg 64'; Oldaker (yellow card) 96'; Dobra (yellow card) 96'	Report	Payne 6'; Goodliffe (yellow card) 11'; Payne (yellow card) 75'; Taylor (yellow card) 96'	Stadium: SMH Group Stadium; Attendance: 7,465; Referee: Dale Baines

26 October 2024 14	Colchester United	1–2	Salford City	Colchester
12:30 BST	Anderson 70'	Report	N'Mai 61'; Kouassi 76'	Stadium: Colchester Community Stadium; Attendance: 3,936; Referee: Alex Chilowicz
Note: Fixture was initially scheduled for a 15:00 kick-off, but was moved for live Sky Sports broadcast.

9 November 2024 15	Barrow	1–1	Colchester United	Barrow-in-Furness
15:00 GMT	Newby 31'; Spence (yellow card) 49'; Canavan (yellow card) 82'; Stanway (yellow card) 89'	Report	Payne (yellow card) 45+5'; Iandolo (yellow card) 61'; Tovide (yellow card) 88'; Taylor 90+2' (yellow card) 90+5'	Stadium: Holker Street; Attendance: 3,179; Referee: Ollie Yates

16 November 2024 16	Colchester United	1–1	Bradford City	Colchester
15:00 GMT	McDonnell (yellow card) 64' (goal) 90+9'	Report	Cook 30' (yellow card) 70'; Shepherd (yellow card) 71'; Richards (yellow card) 78'; Halliday (yellow card) 82'	Stadium: Colchester Community Stadium; Attendance: 4,825; Referee: Carl Brook

23 November 2024 17	Grimsby Town	0–1	Colchester United	Cleethorpes
12:30 GMT		Report	Edwards (yellow card) 1'; Egbo (yellow card) 28'; Gordon 78'; Macey (yellow card) 90+2'	Stadium: Blundell Park; Attendance: 4,952; Referee: Martin Woods
Note: Fixture was initially scheduled for a 15:00 kick-off, but was moved for live Sky Sports broadcast.

30 November 2024 11	Fleetwood Town	0–0	Colchester United	Fleetwood
12:30 BST	Mayor (yellow card) 61'; Shaw (yellow card) 69'	Report	Macey (yellow card) 71'	Stadium: Highbury Stadium; Attendance: 3,202; Referee: Darren Drysdale
Note: Fixture was originally scheduled for 12 October, but was postponed due to international call-ups in the Fleetwood squad.

3 December 2024 18	Colchester United	4–0	Swindon Town	Colchester
19:45 GMT	Smith 9' (o.g.); Tovide 12', 26'; Payne 38'	Report	Cotterill (yellow card) 34'; Hall (yellow card) 43'; McGregor (yellow card) 58'	Stadium: Colchester Community Stadium; Attendance: 3,401; Referee: Andrew Humphries

14 December 2024 20	Colchester United	0–0	Newport County	Colchester
15:00 GMT	Egbo (yellow card) 21'; Tovide (yellow card) 51'; Flanagan (yellow card) 90'	Report	McLoughlin (yellow card) 42'; Morris (yellow card) 90+3'	Stadium: Colchester Community Stadium; Attendance: 4,046; Referee: Scott Jackson

20 December 2024 21	Crewe Alexandra	0–0	Colchester United	Crewe
19:45 GMT	Williams (yellow card) 7'	Report	Iandolo (yellow card) 87'	Stadium: Gresty Road; Attendance: 9,288; Referee: Geoff Eltringham
Note: Fixture was initially scheduled for 21 December, but was moved following an agreement between the two sides.

26 December 2024 22	Colchester United	2–0	Gillingham	Colchester
15:00 GMT	Taylor 6'; Egbo (yellow card) 75'; McDonnell (yellow card) 77'; Gordon 85'	Report	Ogie (yellow card) 86'; Clarke (yellow card) 90'	Stadium: Colchester Community Stadium; Attendance: 5,934; Referee: Farai Hallam

29 December 2024 23	Colchester United	1–1	Doncaster Rovers	Colchester
15:00 GMT	Taylor (yellow card) 45', (goal) 51'; McDonnell (yellow card) 45+1'; Thorn (yellow card) 60'; Iandolo (yellow card) 90+1'	Report	Sterry (yellow card) 32'; Gibson 40', (yellow card) 69' (yellow-red card) 80'; Bailey (yellow card) 42'	Stadium: Colchester Community Stadium; Attendance: 5,729; Referee: James Durkin

1 January 2025 24	Swindon Town	3–2	Colchester United	Swindon
15:00 GMT	Clarke 15'; Sobowale (yellow card) 45+1'; Barden (yellow card) 60'; Drinan 82'; Cox 90+8' (pen.) (yellow card) 90+9'	Report	McDonnell (yellow card) 30'; Gordon (yellow card) 45+1'; Payne 44' (pen.), 61' (pen.); Iandolo (yellow card) 78' (yellow-red card) 90+4'	Stadium: County Ground; Attendance: 7,680; Referee: Tom Reeves

4 January 2025 25	Colchester United	0–2	Accrington Stanley	Colchester
15:00 GMT	McDonnell (yellow card) 38'; Donnelly (yellow card) 62'; Read (yellow card) 78'; Bishop (yellow card) 90+1'	Report	Whalley 18' (pen.), 59'; Love (yellow card) 39'; Woods (yellow card) 55'	Stadium: Colchester Community Stadium; Attendance: 4,366; Referee: Jamie O'Connor

18 January 2025 27	Bromley	0–1	Colchester United	Bromley
15:00 GMT	Sowunmi (yellow card) 90+1'; Imray (yellow card) 90+4'	Report	Edwards 4'; Flanagan (yellow card) 90+3'; Iandolo (yellow card) 90+4'	Stadium: Hayes Lane; Attendance: 3,907; Referee: Greg Rollason

21 January 2025 26	Harrogate Town	0–0	Colchester United	Harrogate
19:45 GMT	Daly (yellow card) 27'; Sims (yellow card) 37'; Sutton (yellow card) 57'	Report	Flanagan (yellow card) 58'	Stadium: Wetherby Road; Attendance: 2,284; Referee: Scott Tallis
Note: Fixture was initially scheduled for 11 January, but was moved due to Harrogate's FA Cup involvements.

25 January 2025 28	Colchester United	1–0	Morecambe	Colchester
15:00 GMT	Bishop (yellow card) 33'; Egbo 65'; Thorn (yellow card) 90+1'; Taylor (yellow card) 90+5'	Report	Hendrie (yellow card) 34'; Tutonda (yellow card) 37'; Angol (red card) 45+2'	Stadium: Colchester Community Stadium; Attendance: 4,238; Referee: Sam Purkiss

1 February 2025 30	Tranmere Rovers	1–3	Colchester United	Birkenhead
15:00 GMT	Dennis 50'; Turnbull (yellow card) 64'; Garrett (yellow card) 81'	Report	Taylor 9' (pen.), (yellow card) 23', (goal) 33'; McDonnell (yellow card) 52'; Edwards 63'; Iandolo (yellow card) 72'	Stadium: Prenton Park; Attendance: 5,166; Referee: Scott Oldham

8 February 2025 31	Colchester United	2–1	Walsall	Colchester
15:00 GMT	Flanagan (yellow card) 53'; Kelleher (yellow card) 57'; Bishop 69'; Edwards 74'; Payne (yellow card) 83'; Simpson (yellow card) 90+9'	Report	Allen (yellow card) 19' (yellow-red card) 78'; Lakin 65'; Matt (yellow card) 62'; McEntee (yellow card) 89'; Barrett (yellow card) 90+9'	Stadium: Colchester Community Stadium; Attendance: 4,734; Referee: Lee Swabey

15 February 2025 32	Carlisle United	0–0	Colchester United	Carlisle
15:00 GMT	Patching (yellow card) 31'; McArthur (yellow card) 41'	Report	McDonnell (yellow card) 28'; Simpson (yellow card) 90+3'	Stadium: Brunton Park; Attendance: 7,021; Referee: Jeremy Simpson

18 February 2025 19	Notts County	1–1	Colchester United	Nottingham
19:45 GMT	Grant 3'; Cundy (yellow card) 76'	Report	Johnson 48' (o.g.); McDonnell (yellow card) 64'; Egbo (yellow card) 78'	Stadium: Meadow Lane; Attendance: 9,467; Referee: Scott Jackson
Note: Fixture was originally scheduled for 7 December, but was postponed due to spectator and player safety concerns.

22 February 2025 33	Colchester United	1–1	AFC Wimbledon	Colchester
15:00 GMT	Taylor (yellow card) 6'; Edwards (yellow card) 25'; Iandolo (yellow card) 75'; Tovide 89'	Report	Browne (yellow card) 21', (goal) 39'; Ogundere (yellow card) 60'; Tilley (yellow card) 65'; Johnson (yellow card) 67'; Lewis (yellow card) 77'; Goodman (yellow card) 83'	Stadium: Colchester Community Stadium; Attendance: 6,029; Referee: Richard Eley

1 March 2025 34	Milton Keynes Dons	0–1	Colchester United	Milton Keynes
15:00 GMT	White (yellow card) 28'; Gilbey (yellow card) 86'; Hendry (red card) 90+2'	Report	Gordon (yellow card) 28'; Payne 87' (pen.); Simpson (yellow card) 90+1'	Stadium: Stadium MK; Attendance: 8,002; Referee: Alex Chilowicz

4 March 2025 35	Colchester United	1–0	Chesterfield	Colchester
19:45 GMT	Gordon 59'	Report	Mandeville (yellow card) 66'; Sparkes (yellow card) 69'; Sheckleford (yellow card) 75'; Madden (red card) 89'	Stadium: Colchester Community Stadium; Attendance: 3,774; Referee: James Durkin

8 March 2025 36	Cheltenham Town	0–1	Colchester United	Cheltenham
15:00 GMT	Dieng (yellow card) 71'	Report	Tucker (yellow card) 52'; Anderson 69'; McDonnell (yellow card) 80'; Macey (yellow card) 90+5'	Stadium: Whaddon Road; Attendance: 3,954; Referee: Simon Mather

11 March 2025 29	Colchester United	2–1	Port Vale	Colchester
19:45 GMT	Tovide 34'; Kelleher 86'	Report	Richards 85'	Stadium: Colchester Community Stadium; Attendance: 4,055; Referee: Aaron Bannister
Note: Fixture was originally scheduled for 28 January, but was postponed due to a waterlogged pitch.

15 March 2025 37	Colchester United	3–0	Fleetwood Town	Colchester
15:00 GMT	Taylor 55'; Edwards 59'; Payne 85'; Gordon (yellow card) 89'	Report	Hunt (yellow card) 47'	Stadium: Colchester Community Stadium; Attendance: 5,636; Referee: Carl Brook

22 March 2025 38	Bradford City	4–1	Colchester United	Bradford
15:00 GMT	Kavanagh 31', 70'; Lapslie 41', 78'	Report	Anderson 36'	Stadium: Valley Parade; Attendance: 23,381; Referee: Will Finnie

28 March 2025 39	Colchester United	1–2	Grimsby Town	Colchester
19:45 GMT	Edwards 51', (yellow card) 84'; Hunt (yellow card) 82'	Report	Green (yellow card) 28', (goal) 46'; Khouri 76', (yellow card) 79'	Stadium: Colchester Community Stadium; Attendance: 6,986; Referee: Charles Breakspear
Note: Fixture was initially scheduled for 29 March, but was moved on agreement from both clubs to allow an extra day's recovery between games.

1 April 2025 40	Gillingham	1–1	Colchester United	Gillingham
15:00 GMT	Clark 77' (pen.)	Report	Payne 20'; Hunt (yellow card) 45+8'; Iandolo (yellow card) 48'; Simpson (yellow card) 51'; Thorn (yellow card) 75'; Egbo (yellow card) 77'	Stadium: Priestfield Stadium; Attendance: 5,924; Referee: James Linington

5 April 2025 41	Colchester United	1–0	Notts County	Colchester
15:00 GMT	Simpson 44'; Egbo (yellow card) 86'; Iandolo (yellow card) 90+5'	Report	Platt (yellow card) 77'; Bedeau (yellow card) 82'; McGoldrick (yellow card) 90+5'	Stadium: Colchester Community Stadium; Attendance: 6,172; Referee: Josh Smith

12 April 2025 42	Newport County	0–2	Colchester United	Newport
15:00 GMT	Baker (yellow card) 27'; Brennan (yellow card) 87'	Report	Simpson (yellow card) 72'; Kelleher 88'; Scully 90+4'	Stadium: Rodney Parade; Attendance: 3,899; Referee: Richard Eley

18 April 2025 43	Colchester United	0–0	Crewe Alexandra	Colchester
19:45 GMT	Tovide (yellow card) 86'; Read (penalty missed) 87'	Report	Lunt (red card) 45+5'; Billington (yellow card) 53'; Long (yellow card) 82'; Williams (yellow card) 86'; Marschall (yellow card) 86'	Stadium: Colchester Community Stadium; Attendance: 7,623; Referee: Scott Oldham

21 April 2025 44	Doncaster Rovers	3–0	Colchester United	Doncaster
15:00 GMT	Clifton 9'; Gibson 22'; Senior (yellow card) 51'; Kelly 91+1'	Report	Edwards (yellow card) 25' (yellow-red card) 80'; Lisbie (yellow card) 61'; Iandolo (yellow card) 70'	Stadium: Eco-Power Stadium; Attendance: 8,936; Referee: Alan Young

26 April 2025 45	Salford City	4–1	Colchester United	Kersal
15:00 GMT	Adelakun 2' (pen.), 56' (pen.); Shephard 21'; Stockton 24'; Woodburn (yellow card) 46'; Ashley (yellow card) 68'; Garbutt (yellow card) 75'; N'Mai (yellow card) 89'	Report	Kelleher (yellow card) 1'; Iandolo 66'; Read (yellow card) 90+2'	Stadium: Moor Lane; Attendance: 3,150; Referee: Seb Stockbridge

3 May 2025 46	Colchester United	0–0	Barrow	Colchester
15:00 GMT		Report	Gotts (yellow card) 18'; Foley (yellow card) 35'; Cameron (red card) 76'; Williams (yellow card) 90+5'; Barnes (yellow card) 90+7'; Popov (yellow card) 90+7'	Stadium: Colchester Community Stadium; Attendance: 7,512; Referee: Ruebyn Ricardo

=== FA Cup ===
Colchester United were drawn away to Swindon Town in the first round.

Win Draw Loss Fixtures

2 November 2024 First round	Swindon Town	2–1 (a.e.t.)	Colchester United	Swindon
15:00 GMT	Wright (yellow card) 23'; McGregor 83', (yellow card) 102'; Smith (yellow card) 85'; Tshimanga 106'	Report	Flanagan (yellow card) 10'; McDonnell (yellow card) 23'; Gordon (yellow card) 63'; Anderson 64'; Hunt (yellow card) 71'; Iandolo (yellow card) 85'; Donnelly (yellow card) 90'	Stadium: County Ground; Attendance: 4,855; Referee: Scott Jackson

=== EFL Cup ===
On 27 June, the draw for the first round was made, with Colchester being drawn at home against Reading. In the second round, they were drawn at home to Brentford.

Win Draw Loss Fixtures

13 August 2024 First round	Colchester United	2–2 (4–3 p)	Reading	Colchester
19:45 BST	Hopper 3'; Payne 55' (pen.); Ihionvien (yellow card) 90+9'; Kelleher (yellow card) 90+9'	Report	Kanu (yellow card) 28'; Savage (yellow card) 45+1', (goal) 65'; Wing 73'	Stadium: Colchester Community Stadium; Attendance: 3,123; Referee: Neil Hair
	Penalties
	Ihionvien (penalty scored); Read (penalty scored); Oni (penalty scored); Gordon (penalty scored)		(penalty scored) Wareham; (penalty missed) Ehibhatiomhan; (penalty scored) Bindon; (penalty scored) Wing; (penalty missed) Mbengue

28 August 2024 Second round	Colchester United	0–1	Brentford	Colchester
19:45 BST	Ihionvien (yellow card) 71'; Payne (penalty missed) 82'; Tovide (yellow card) 90+4'	Report	Lewis-Potter 45', (yellow card) 83'	Stadium: Colchester Community Stadium; Attendance: 6,716; Referee: Paul Howard

=== EFL Trophy ===
In the group stage, Colchester were drawn into Southern Group E alongside Leyton Orient, Milton Keynes Dons and Arsenal U21. Colchester were then drawn at home against AFC Wimbledon in the round of 32 and to Cheltenham Town in the round of 16.

==== Group stage ====
Pos	Div	Team	Pld	W	PW	PL	L	GF	GA	GD	Pts	Qualification
1	L2	Colchester United	3	2	0	1	0	6	2	+4	7	Advance to Round 2
2	L1	Leyton Orient	3	1	1	0	1	5	4	+1	5	Advance to Round 2
3	ACA	Arsenal U21	3	1	0	1	1	4	6	−2	4	
4	L2	Milton Keynes Dons	3	0	1	0	2	4	7	−3	2	

Source: EFL

Win Draw Loss Fixtures

17 September 2024 Group stage	Colchester United	2–1	Milton Keynes Dons	Colchester
19:45 BST	Kelleher (yellow card) 27', (goal) 54'; McDonnell (yellow card) 35'; Scully 41' (pen.); Bendle (yellow card) 77'; Hunt (yellow card) 79'	Report	Wearne 34'	Stadium: Colchester Community Stadium; Attendance: 1,148; Referee: Scott Tallis

8 October 2024 Group stage	Leyton Orient	1–1 (4–2 p)	Colchester United	Leyton
19:00 BST	Obiero 30'; Simpson (yellow card) 82'	Report	Goodliffe 79'; Tovide (yellow card) 81'; Hopper (yellow card) 82'; Hunt (yellow card) 89'; Egbo (yellow card) 92'	Stadium: Brisbane Road; Attendance: 1,483; Referee: Abigail Byrne
	Penalties
	(penalty scored) Agyei; (penalty scored) O'Neill; (penalty scored) Simpson; (penalty missed) Brown; (penalty scored) Kelman		(penalty scored) Payne; (penalty scored) Scully; (penalty missed) Read; (penalty missed) Tovide

12 November 2024 Group stage	Colchester United	3–0	Arsenal U21	Colchester
19:45 GMT	Hopper 16'; Anderson 43'; Payne (yellow card) 46'; Egbo 50'; Goodliffe (yellow card) 90+1'	Report	Nichols (yellow card) 79'; Heaven (yellow card) 90'	Stadium: Colchester Community Stadium; Attendance: 4,265; Referee: Stephen Parkinson

==== Knoutout stages ====
10 December 2024 Round of 32	Colchester United	2–0	AFC Wimbledon	Colchester
19:45 GMT	Taylor 6', 33'; Macey (yellow card) 90+3'	Report	Harbottle (yellow card) 40'; Bugiel (yellow card) 78'	Stadium: Colchester Community Stadium; Attendance: 1,139; Referee: Oliver Mackey

14 January 2025 Round of 16	Cheltenham Town	2–1	Colchester United	Cheltenham
19:00 GMT	Pett 3'; Jude-Boyd (yellow card) 34'; Archer (yellow card) 76'; Thomas (yellow card) 79'; Miller 90+1'	Report	Kelleher (yellow card) 28'; Taylor 45+3'; Payne (yellow card) 61'	Stadium: Whaddon Road; Referee: David Rock

== Statistics ==
=== Appearances and goals ===
As of match played 26 April 2025

Players with no appearances are not included on the list
Italics indicate a loaned in player

No.	Pos	Nat	Player	Total		League Two		FA Cup		EFL Cup		EFL Trophy	
No.	Pos	Nat	Player	Apps	Goals	Apps	Goals	Apps	Goals	Apps	Goals	Apps	Goals
1	GK	(England) ENG	Matt Macey	50	0	45+0	0	1+0	0	2+0	0	2+0	0
3	DF	(England) ENG	Ellis Iandolo	49	1	43+0	1	1+0	0	2+0	0	3+0	0
4	DF	(Republic of Ireland) IRL	Fiacre Kelleher	31	3	23+4	2	0+0	0	1+0	0	2+1	1
5	DF	(England) ENG	Ben Goodliffe	14	4	8+3	3	0+0	0	1+0	0	2+0	1
6	DF	(Northern Ireland) NIR	Tom Flanagan	44	0	40+0	0	1+0	0	0+0	0	2+1	0
7	FW	(England) ENG	Harry Anderson	37	5	20+11	3	1+0	1	1+0	0	4+0	1
8	MF	(England) ENG	Teddy Bishop	29	1	21+5	1	0+0	0	1+0	0	2+0	0
9	FW	(England) ENG	Samson Tovide	32	7	22+6	7	0+0	0	1+1	0	1+1	0
10	MF	(England) ENG	Jack Payne	49	9	38+3	8	1+0	0	1+1	1	4+1	0
11	FW	(England) ENG	John-Kymani Gordon	47	3	16+24	3	1+0	0	0+2	0	2+2	0
12	GK	(England) ENG	Tom Smith	3	0	0+0	0	0+0	0	0+0	0	3+0	0
14	FW	(England) ENG	Kyreece Lisbie	3	0	1+2	0	0+0	0	0+0	0	0+0	0
15	MF	(Northern Ireland) NIR	Jamie McDonnell	37	1	29+3	1	1+0	0	0+0	0	4+0	0
16	MF	(England) ENG	Arthur Read	48	1	23+17	1	1+0	0	1+1	0	2+3	0
17	FW	(England) ENG	Tyreece Simpson	19	1	6+13	1	0+0	0	0+0	0	0+0	0
18	DF	(England) ENG	Mandela Egbo	52	2	38+6	1	0+1	0	1+1	0	3+2	1
19	DF	(England) ENG	Rob Hunt	27	0	15+6	0	1+0	0	2+0	0	3+0	0
20	MF	(England) ENG	Alfie Bendle	1	0	0+0	0	0+0	0	0+0	0	0+1	0
21	FW	(England) ENG	Owura Edwards	42	7	30+7	7	0+0	0	1+1	0	2+1	0
22	DF	(England) ENG	Jack Tucker	9	0	2+7	0	0+0	0	0+0	0	0+0	0
25	FW	(Republic of Ireland) IRL	Anthony Scully	17	2	2+12	1	0+1	0	0+0	0	2+0	1
27	FW	(England) ENG	Ken Aboh	2	0	0+2	0	0+0	0	0+0	0	0+0	0
30	DF	(Grenada) GRN	Kane Vincent-Young	9	0	0+9	0	0+0	0	0+0	0	0+0	0
31	FW	(England) ENG	Oscar Thorn	28	0	10+15	0	0+0	0	0+0	0	2+1	0
33	FW	(Montserrat) MSR	Lyle Taylor	40	13	27+10	10	1+0	0	0+0	0	2+0	3
34	FW	(England) ENG	Hakeem Sandah	3	0	0+0	0	0+1	0	0+0	0	0+2	0
40	DF	(England) ENG	Frankie Terry	3	0	1+0	0	0+0	0	0+1	0	0+1	0
41	MF	(England) ENG	Max Jolliffe	2	0	0+2	0	0+0	0	0+0	0	0+0	0
42	MF	(England) ENG	Milton Oni	3	0	0+1	0	0+0	0	1+1	0	0+0	0
45	MF	(England) ENG	Ollie Godziemski	1	0	0+0	0	0+0	0	0+0	0	0+1	0
47	FW	(England) ENG	Rashaad Drysdale	1	0	0+0	0	0+0	0	0+0	0	0+1	0
Player(s) who featured whilst on loan but returned to parent club during the season:
25	DF	(Northern Ireland) NIR	Aaron Donnelly	22	0	14+3	0	1+0	0	1+0	0	3+0	0
Player(s) who featured but departed the club permanently during the season:
30	MF	(England) ENG	Alex Woodyard	19	0	11+3	0	0+1	0	2+0	0	1+1	0
48	FW	(England) ENG	Bradley Ihionvien	4	0	1+1	0	0+0	0	1+1	0	0+0	0
27	MF	(England) ENG	Matt Jay	1	0	0+0	0	0+0	0	0+0	0	1+0	0
14	FW	(England) ENG	Tom Hopper	23	2	9+7	0	0+1	0	2+0	1	3+1	1
