= Mandela Egbo =

English footballer (born 1997)

Personal information
- Full name: Mandela Chinweizu Egbo
- Date of birth: 17 August 1997 (age 29)
- Place of birth: Brent, England
- Height: 1.80 m (5 ft 11 in)
- Position: Right-back

Team information
- Current team: Chelmsford City
- Number: 18

Youth career
- Hackney JFC
- Afewee Urban
- –2015: Crystal Palace

Senior career*
Years	Team	Apps	(Gls)
2015–2019	Borussia Mönchengladbach II	83	(3)
2018	Borussia Mönchengladbach	1	(0)
2019–2020	Darmstadt 98	5	(0)
2020–2021	New York Red Bulls	11	(1)
2020–2021	New York Red Bulls II	21	(4)
2022	Swindon Town	9	(0)
2022–2023	Charlton Athletic	15	(0)
2023–2025	Colchester United	70	(1)
2026–	Chelmsford City	32	(2)

International career
2012–2013	England U16	5	(0)
2013–2014	England U17	11	(0)
2014	England U18	2	(0)
- * Club domestic league appearances and goals as of 17:10, 22 November 2026 (UTC)

Mandela Chinweizu Egbo (born 17 August 1997) is an English professional footballer who plays as a right-back for Chelmsford City.

== Club career ==
=== Borussia Mönchengladbach ===
Born in Brent, London, Egbo began his youth career with hometown club Hackney JFC and Afewee Urban before joining Crystal Palace. He moved from Crystal Palace to German club Borussia Mönchengladbach at the age of 17, being assigned to the reserve side. On 24 February 2018, Egbo made his Bundesliga debut for Borussia Mönchengladbach, coming on in the second half for Denis Zakaria in a 1–0 victory over Hannover 96.

=== Darmstadt 98 ===
On 21 May 2019, after four years with Borussia Mönchengladbach, Egbo joined 2. Bundesliga side Darmstadt 98 on a free transfer, signing a three-year deal. He made his debut with Darmstadt on 28 July 2019 in the 1–1 away game against Hamburger SV, coming on for Patrick Herrmann in the 68th minute of the match.

=== New York Red Bulls ===
On 30 January 2020, Egbo moved to MLS side New York Red Bulls. On 20 August 2020, Egbo made his league debut for New York Red Bulls, coming on in the second half in a 1–0 victory over rival New York City FC. On 23 November 2020, Egbo scored his first goal for New York, with a penalty kick, in a 4–1 victory over Inter Miami.

=== New York Red Bulls II ===
During the 2021 season, Egbo was loaned to New York Red Bulls II, he made his season debut on 30 April 2021, starting in a 3–2 loss to Hartford Athletic and scoring a late goal from the penalty spot. On 18 May 2021, Egbo helped New York to a 2–1 victory over Loudoun United, converting the winning goal from the penalty spot. On 23 May 2021, Egbo once again converted from the penalty spot in a 2–2 draw with Charleston Battery.

Following the 2021 season, New York declined their contract option on Egbo.

=== Swindon Town ===
On 12 March 2022, Egbo joined Swindon Town on a short-term contract.

=== Charlton Athletic ===
On 21 June 2022, Egbo joined Charlton Athletic on a two–year deal – with the option of a third year – following the expiry of his contract at Swindon Town.

=== Colchester United ===
On 15 August 2023, Egbo joined Colchester United for an undisclosed fee.

=== Chelmsford City ===
On 21 February 2026, Egbo joined Chelmsford City. On 21 May 2026, Chelmsford announced Egbo had left the club. However, on 3 August 2026, Egbo re-signed for Chelmsford.

== International career ==
Egbo was born in England and is of Nigerian descent. He is a youth international for England and was a part of the squad that won the 2014 UEFA European Under-17 Championship.

== Career statistics ==
As of match played 25 April 2026

Appearances and goals by club, season and competition
Club	Season	League			National cup		EFL Cup		Other		Total	
Club	Season	Division	Apps	Goals	Apps	Goals	Apps	Goals	Apps	Goals	Apps	Goals
Borussia Mönchengladbach II	2015–16	Regionalliga West	14	0	—		—		—		14	0
Borussia Mönchengladbach II	2016–17	Regionalliga West	22	0	—		—		—		22	0
Borussia Mönchengladbach II	2017–18	Regionalliga West	23	2	—		—		—		23	2
Borussia Mönchengladbach II	2018–19	Regionalliga West	24	1	—		—		—		24	1
Borussia Mönchengladbach II	Total		83	3	0	0	0	0	0	0	83	3
Borussia Mönchengladbach	2017–18	Bundesliga	1	0	0	0	—		—		1	0
Borussia Mönchengladbach	2018–19	Bundesliga	0	0	0	0	—		—		0	0
Borussia Mönchengladbach	Total		1	0	0	0	0	0	0	0	1	0
Darmstadt 98	2019–20	2. Bundesliga	5	0	1	0	—		—		6	0
New York Red Bulls	2020	Major League Soccer	9	1	0	0	—		—		9	1
New York Red Bulls	2021	Major League Soccer	2	0	0	0	—		—		2	0
New York Red Bulls	Total		11	1	1	0	0	0	0	0	11	1
New York Red Bulls II	2021	USL Championship	21	4	—		—		—		21	4
Swindon Town	2021–22	League Two	9	0	0	0	0	0	2 (Note: Appearances in the League Two play-offs)	0	11	0
Charlton Athletic	2022–23	League One	15	0	0	0	0	0	0	0	15	0
Colchester United	2023–24	League Two	25	0	1	0	0	0	3 (Note: Appearances in the EFL Trophy)	0	29	0
Colchester United	2024–25	League Two	45	1	1	0	2	0	5	1	53	2
Colchester United	Total		70	1	2	0	2	0	8	1	82	2
Chelmsford City	2025–26	National League South	17	2	—		—		—		17	2
Career total			232	11	3	0	2	0	10	1	247	12

== Honours ==
England U17

- UEFA European Under-17 Championship: 2014
