= 2026–27 Oxford United F.C. season =

English football club season

Oxford United
2026–27 season
- Owner: Erick Thohir
- Chairman: Dusan Bogdanovic
- Head coach: Aaron Ramsey
- Stadium: Kassam Stadium
- EFL Cup: First round (eliminated by Leyton Orient)

The 2026–27 season is the 133rd season in the history of Oxford United Football Club. It is their first season back in League One (the third tier of English football), since the 2023–24 campaign following their relegation from the Championship in the preceding season. In addition to the domestic league, the club will also participate in the FA Cup, the EFL Cup, and the EFL Trophy.

== Managerial changes ==
Before the season started, Matt Bloomfield departed the club as head coach. He was shortly replaced by Aaron Ramsey.

== Transfers ==
=== In ===
Date	Pos.	Player	From	Fee	Ref.
15 June 2026 (Note: The transfer was announced on 7 May, and became official on June 15 once the transfer window opened.)	LB	(Netherlands) Ruben Roosken	(England) Huddersfield Town	Undisclosed	
1 July 2026 (Note: The transfer was announced on 27 June, and became official on July 1 once Kent's contract at Heart of Midlothian expired.)	CB	(England) Frankie Kent	(Scotland) Heart of Midlothian	Free	

=== Loaned in ===
Date	Pos.	Player	From	Loaned until	Ref.
28 August 2026	CM	(Wales) Kai Andrews	(England) Coventry City	2 January 2027	
2 September 2026	RW	(England) Luka Lynch	(England) Aston Villa	2 January 2027	

=== Loaned out ===
Date	Pos.	Player	To	Loaned until	Ref.
11 July 2026	CF	(Indonesia) Ole Romeny	(Netherlands) Fortuna Sittard	End of Season (Note: Option to make the move permanent at the conclusion of the loan deal)	
14 August 2026	CB	(England) Aaron Lacey	(England) Chesham United	7 November 2026 (Note: On 7 November, Lacey was recalled from his initial half-season loan at Chesham United.)	
2 September 2026	CDM	(Belgium) Brian De Keersmaecker	(England) Bristol City	End of Season	
13 November 2026	CF	(England) Kasway Burton	(England) Farnborough	11 December 2026	

=== Out ===
Date	Pos.	Player	To	Fee	Ref.
10 July 2026	CF	(Slovenia) Nik Prelec	(Poland) Jagiellonia Białystok	Undisclosed	
3 August 2026	CDM	(Wales) Will Vaulks	(England) Tranmere Rovers	Free transfer	
4 August 2026	CM	(England) Callum Doyle	(England) Bedford Town	Free transfer	
27 August 2026	RW	(England) Stanley Mills	(England) Preston North End	£2,500,000	

=== Released / out of contract ===
Date	Pos.	Player	Subsequent club	Joined date	Ref.
30 June 2026	CB	(Scotland) Stuart Findlay	(Scotland) Heart of Midlothian	1 July 2026	
30 June 2026	CF	(England) Will Goodwin	(England) Gillingham	1 July 2026	
30 June 2026	GK	(England) Matt Ingram	(England) West Bromwich Albion	1 July 2026	
30 June 2026	CM	(England) Joshua Johnson	(England) Maidenhead United	1 July 2026	
30 June 2026	LB	(England) Richard McIntyre	(England) Salisbury	1 July 2026	
30 June 2026	RB	(England) Harrison Mole	(England) Banbury United	1 July 2026	
30 June 2026	CB	(Moldova) Stephan Negru	(England) Swindon Town	1 July 2026	
30 June 2026	LW	(Poland) Przemysław Płacheta	(United States) Austin	1 July 2026	
30 June 2026	CAM	(Jamaica) Myles Peart-Harris	(England) Middlesbrough	3 July 2026	
30 June 2026	MF	(England) Kaya Halil	(England) Cheshunt	24 July 2026	
30 June 2026	RB	(Netherlands) Hidde ter Avest	(Netherlands) Willem II	28 July 2026	
30 June 2026	CF	(Wales) Tom Bradshaw	(England) Rotherham United	5 August 2026	
30 June 2026	GK	(England) Jacob Knightbridge	(England) Tottenham Hotspur	28 August 2026	
30 June 2026	RW	(England) Owen Dale	(England) Northampton Town	1 September 2026	
30 June 2026	CAM	(Indonesia) Marselino Ferdinan	(Indonesia) Persija Jakarta	23 September 2026	

=== New contract ===
Date	Pos.	Player	Contract until	Ref.

== Pre-season and friendlies ==
On 5 June, Oxford announced a warm-weather training camp in Cádiz, along with a friendly against Aldershot Town. Three days later, a fixture against Barnet was confirmed. Home fixtures against Crawley Town and Ipswich Town were later added to the schedule.

Win Draw Loss Fixtures

11 July 2026 Friendly	Oxford United	7–1	Wealdstone	Horspath
15:00 BST		Report		Stadium: Oxford Sports Park; Attendance: 0 (BCD)

21 July 2026 Friendly	Aldershot Town	1–3	Oxford United	Aldershot
19:00 BST	Oshilaja 20'	Report	Emakhu 29'; O'Donkor 30'; Jeon Jin-woo 78'	Stadium: The EBB Stadium at The Recreation Ground

25 July 2026 Friendly	Barnet	1–2	Oxford United	Edgware
15:00 BST	Senior 55'	Report	Mills 3'; O'Donkor 88'	Stadium: The Hive Stadium

28 July 2026 Friendly	Oxford United	3−1	Crawley Town	Littlemore
19:00 BST	Barker 10' (o.g.); O'Donkor 70'; Goodrham 89'		Ebiowei 31'	Stadium: Kassam Stadium

1 August 2026 Friendly	Oxford United	2–0	Ipswich Town	Littlemore
12:00 BST	Mills (yellow card) 42', (goal) 72'; Currie 61'	Report		Stadium: Kassam Stadium; Attendance: 3,029 (759 away)

== Competitions ==
=== Overall record ===
Competition	First match	Last match	Starting round	Final position	Record							
Competition	First match	Last match	Starting round	Final position	Pld	W	D	L	GF	GA	GD	Win %
League One	15 August 2026	22 August 2026	Matchday 1	TBC	2	1	1	0	4	3	+1	50.00
FA Cup	November 2026	TBC	First round	TBC	0	0	0	0	0	0	+0	—
EFL Cup	8 August 2026	8 August 2026	First round	First round	1	0	0	1	0	2	−2	0.00
EFL Trophy	September 2026	TBC	Group stage	TBC	0	0	0	0	0	0	+0	—
Total					3	1	1	1	4	5	−1	33.33

Last updated: 23 August 2026
Source: Soccerway

=== League One ===
==== League table ====
Pos	Team	Pld	W	D	L	GF	GA	GD	Pts	Promotion, qualification or relegation
1	Stockport County	16	10	2	4	32	15	+17	32	Promotion to EFL Championship
2	Huddersfield Town	15	8	5	2	28	13	+15	29	Promotion to EFL Championship
3	Oxford United	14	8	5	1	26	14	+12	29	Qualification for League One play-offs
4	Luton Town	15	8	3	4	29	22	+7	27	Qualification for League One play-offs
5	Sheffield Wednesday	15	7	5	3	27	15	+12	26	Qualification for League One play-offs

Updated to match(es) played on 21 November 2026. Source: EFL Official Website
Rules for classification: 1) Points; 2) Goal difference; 3) Number of goals scored; 4) Head-to-head results; 5) Wins; 6) Away goals; 7) Penalty points (sec 9.5); 8) 12-point sending off offences

==== Results summary ====
Overall								Home						Away					
Pld	W	D	L	GF	GA	GD	Pts	W	D	L	GF	GA	GD	W	D	L	GF	GA	GD
13	7	5	1	22	11	+11	26	4	3	0	11	4	+7	3	2	1	11	7	+4

Last updated: 4 November 2026.
Source: Soccerway

==== Results by round ====
Round	1	2	4	5	6	7	10	11	12	13	9^{3}	14	3^{1}	16	17	18	15^{4}	19	8^{2}	20	21	22	23	24	25	26	27	28	29	30	31	32	33
Ground	H	A	A	A	H	H	A	A	H	H	H	A	H	H	A	H	A	H	A	A	H	A	A	H	H	A	A	H	A	H	H	A	H
Result	D	W	L	W	W	D	W	D	W	D	W	D	W																				
Position	10	4	15	10	5	6	8	8	7	7	3	3	3																				
Points	1	4	4	7	10	11	14	15	18	19	22	23	26																				

Source: EFL
A = Away; H = Home; W = Win; D = Draw; L = Loss; P = Postponed
Notes:
- ^{1} Matchday 3 (vs. Reading) was rescheduled following a request from Thames Valley Police.
- ^{2} Matchday 8 (vs. Doncaster Rovers) was postponed due to international call-ups.
- ^{3} Matchday 9 (vs. Stockport County) was postponed due to international call-ups.
- ^{3} Matchday 15 (vs. Peterborough United) was postponed due to international call-ups.

==== Matches ====
On 25 June, the League One fixtures were revealed.

Win Draw Loss Fixtures

15 August 2026 1	Oxford United	2–2	Milton Keynes Dons	Littlemore
12:30 BST	Harris 20', (yellow card) 90+1'; Brannagan (yellow card) 63'; Brown 90+5'	Report	Goode 29', (yellow card) 76'; Collins 34'; Ekpiteta (yellow card) 51'; Matete (yellow card) 90+4'	Stadium: The Kassam Stadium; Attendance: 10,964; Referee: Ollie Yates

22 August 2026 2	Stevenage	1–2	Oxford United	Stevenage
15:00 BST	Roberts 90+8'	Report	O'Donkor 67'; Brannagan 87' (pen.)	Stadium: Stevenage FC Stadium; Referee: James Oldham

1 September 2026 4	Huddersfield Town	3–1	Oxford United	Huddersfield
19:45 BST	Wallace (yellow card) 49'; Radulović 56'; Taylor 74', 77'; Ledson (yellow card) 85'	Report	Currie (yellow card) 35'; O'Donkor 70'; Long (yellow card) 83'	Stadium: Accu Stadium; Referee: Ben Speedie

5 September 2026 5	Leicester City	0–4	Oxford United	Leicester
15:00 BST	Riis (yellow card) 49'	Report	Harris 8', 60'; Andrews (yellow card) 49'; Missanga 57'; McDonnell 77'	Stadium: King Power Stadium; Referee: Dean Whitestone

12 September 2026 6	Oxford United	3–0	Burton Albion	Littlemore
15:00 BST	McDonnell (yellow card) 38'; Dembélé 76'; Sibley 90'; O'Donkor 90+4'	Report	Lewis (yellow card) 23'	Stadium: The Kassam Stadium; Attendance: 9,448 (333 away); Referee: William Davis

19 September 2026 7	Oxford United	1–1	Cambridge United	Littlemore
15:00 BST	Dembélé 15'; Brannagan (yellow card) 45+8'		Curtis (yellow card) 50'; Knight 57', (yellow card) 63'; Lavery (yellow card) 66'; Heffernan (yellow card) 71'; Watts (yellow card) 87'	Stadium: The Kassam Stadium; Referee: Thomas Kirk

10 October 2026 10	Notts County	1–2	Oxford United	Nottingham
12:30 BST	McDonald (yellow card) 7'; Cooper (yellow card) 23'; Sanders (yellow card) 47'; Bedeau (yellow card) 58'; Finneran (yellow card) 70', (goal) 90+1'; Ness (yellow card) 77'	Report	Harris 18'; Sibley (yellow card) 44'; Kioso (yellow card) 82'; Helik (yellow card) 87'; Brannagan 88'	Stadium: Meadow Lane; Attendance: 12,209; Referee: Carl Brook
Note: Fixture was initially scheduled for a 15:00 kick-off, but was brought forward for live Sky Sports broadcasting.

15 October 2026 11	Mansfield Town	1–1	Oxford United	Mansfield
20:00 BST	Moriah-Welsh (yellow card) 14'; Russell (yellow card) 54'; Smith 82'		Kioso (yellow card) 22' (red card) 75'; Lynch 34'; O'Donkor (yellow card) 72' (red card) 84'	Stadium: One Call Stadium; Attendance: 7,652; Referee: Thomas Parsons
Note: Fixture was initially scheduled for 17 October, but was brought forward a couple days for live Sky Sports broadcasting.

20 October 2026 12	Oxford United	2–1	Wigan Athletic	Littlemore
19:45 BST	Helik 44'; Brannagan (yellow card) 68'; Andrews 76'; Dembélé (yellow card) 79'; Harris (yellow card) 89'	Report	Weir (yellow card) 26'; Gray (yellow card) 31'; Saydee 69'; Murray (red card) 72'; Burns (yellow card) 85'	Stadium: The Kassam Stadium; Attendance: 8,605; Referee: Emily Heaslip

24 October 2026 13	Oxford United	0–0	Bradford City	Littlemore
15:00 BST		Report	Connolly (yellow card) 19'; Pratt (yellow card) 45+3'	Stadium: The Kassam Stadium; Referee: Neil Hair

27 October 2026 9	Oxford United	1–0	Stockport County	Littlemore
19:45 BST	Harris 35'; Currie (yellow card) 51'	Report	Pye (yellow card) 85'	Stadium: The Kassam Stadium; Attendance: 9,602; Referee: Stephen Parkinson
Note: The fixture was initially scheduled for 3 October, but was rearranged due to international call-ups.

31 October 2026 14	Barnsley	1–1	Oxford United	Barnsley
15:00 GMT	Shepherd (red card) 9'; Yoganathan 32'; McGeehan (yellow card) 58'; Kelly (yellow card) 67'	Report	Spencer (yellow card) 11'; Harris 60'; Long (yellow card) 68'; Cumming (red card) 88'	Stadium: Oakwell; Attendance: 9,415; Referee: Oliver Mackey

4 November 2026 3	Oxford United	2–0	Reading	Littlemore
19:45 BST	Kioso (yellow card) 40'; O'Donkor 71'; Missanga 78'; Sibley (yellow card) 88'	Report	Stokes (yellow card) 41'; O'Connor (yellow card) 76'; Rinomhota (yellow card) 82'; Lisbie (yellow card) 84'	Stadium: Kassam Stadium; Attendance: 11,473; Referee: Darren Drysdale
Note: Fixture was initially scheduled for 29 August, but was rescheduled following a request from Thames Valley Police. It was then postponed due to Reading's EFL Cup involvements and rearranged for early-November.

21 November 2026 16	Oxford United	4–3	Wycombe Wanderers	Littlemore
15:00 GMT	Emakhu 73'; Brannagan 80' (pen.); Harris 81'; O'Donkor 90+5'; Sibley (yellow card) 90+10'		Wareham 1'; Casey (yellow card) 53' (yellow-red card) 62'; Mothersille 57'; Morley 67'; Leahy (yellow card) 78' (red card); Grimmer (yellow card) 90+7'; Parker (yellow card) 90+9'	Stadium: The Kassam Stadium; Attendance: 11,190; Referee: Martin Coy

28 November 2026 17	Luton Town	v	Oxford United	Luton
15:00 GMT				Stadium: Kenilworth Road

1 December 2026 18	Oxford United	v	Sheffield Wednesday	Littlemore
19:45 GMT				Stadium: The Kassam Stadium

5 December 2026 15	Peterborough United	v	Oxford United	Peterborough
15:00 GMT				Stadium: Weston Homes Stadium
Note: The fixture was initially scheduled for 14 November, but was rearranged due to international call-ups.

12 December 2026 19	Oxford United	v	Blackpool	Littlemore
15:00 GMT				Stadium: The Kassam Stadium

15 December 2026 8	Doncaster Rovers	v	Oxford United	Doncaster
19:45 GMT				Stadium: Club Doncaster Sports Village
Note: The fixture was initially scheduled for 26 September, but was rearranged due to international call-ups.

19 December 2026 20	AFC Wimbledon	v	Oxford United	Wimbledon
15:00 GMT				Stadium: The Cherry Red Records Stadium

26 December 2026 21	Oxford United	v	Plymouth Argyle	Littlemore
15:00 GMT				Stadium: The Kassam Stadium

29 December 2026 22	Bromley	v	Oxford United	Bromley
19:45 GMT				Stadium: Copperjax Community Stadium

1 January 2027 23	Leyton Orient	v	Oxford United	Leyton
15:00 GMT				Stadium: BetWright Stadium

9 January 2027 24	Oxford United	v	AFC Wimbledon	Littlemore
12:30 GMT				Stadium: Kassam Stadium
Note: Fixture was initially scheduled for a 15:00 kick-off, but was brought forward for live Sky Sports broadcasting.

16 January 2027 25	Oxford United	v	Mansfield Town	Littlemore
15:00 GMT				Stadium: Kassam Stadium

20 January 2027 26	Wigan Athletic	v	Oxford United	Wigan
20:00 GMT				Stadium: Brick Community Stadium
Note: Fixture was initially scheduled for 19 January, but was pushed back a night for live Sky Sports broadcasting.

23 January 2027 27	Bradford City	v	Oxford United	Bradford
15:00 GMT				Stadium: Mbanq Valley Parade

30 January 2027 28	Oxford United	v	Barnsley	Littlemore
15:00 GMT				Stadium: Kassam Stadium

6 February 2027 29	Reading	v	Oxford United	Reading
12:30 GMT				Stadium: Select Car Leasing Stadium
Note: Fixture was initially scheduled for a 15:00 kick-off, but was brought forward for live Sky Sports broadcasting.

9 February 2027 30	Oxford United	v	Huddersfield Town	Littlemore
19:45 GMT				Stadium: Kassam Stadium

13 February 2027 31	Oxford United	v	Leicester City	Littlemore
15:00 GMT				Stadium: Kassam Stadium

20 February 2027 32	Burton Albion	v	Oxford United	Burton upon Trent
15:00 GMT				Stadium: Pirelli Stadium

27 February 2027 33	Oxford United	v	Luton Town	Littlemore
12:30 GMT				Stadium: Kassam Stadium
Note: Fixture was initially scheduled for a 15:00 kick-off, but was brought forward for live Sky Sports broadcasting.

=== FA Cup ===
Oxford were drawn at home to Stevenage in the first round.

Win Draw Loss Fixtures

7 November 2026 First round	Oxford United	0–1	Stevenage	Littlemore
15:00 GMT	Goodrham (yellow card) 22'	Report	Piergianni 4', (yellow card) 48'; Earley (yellow card) 66'; Phillips (yellow card) 70'	Stadium: Kassam Stadium; Attendance: 2,885; Referee: Paul Howard

=== EFL Cup ===
Oxford were drawn away to Leyton Orient in the first round.

Win Draw Loss Fixtures

8 August 2026 First round	Leyton Orient	2–0	Oxford United	Leyton
15:00 BST	Stevens (yellow card) 27'; Mitchell 85'; El Mizouni 88'	Report	Emakhu (yellow card) 36'	Stadium: BetWright Stadium; Attendance: 3,783; Referee: Alex Chilowicz

=== EFL Trophy ===
==== Group Stage ====
Oxford were drawn against Cheltenham Town, Exeter City and Tottenham Hotspur U21 into Southern Group A.

Pos	Div	Team	Pld	W	PW	PL	L	GF	GA	GD	Pts	Qualification
1	L2	Exeter City (A)	3	1	1	1	0	6	4	+2	6	Advance to Round 2
2	L1	Oxford United	2	1	0	1	0	6	2	+4	4	Advance to Round 2
3	L2	Cheltenham Town (E)	3	0	2	0	1	4	8	−4	4	
4	ACA	Tottenham Hotspur U21	2	0	0	1	1	2	4	−2	1	

Updated to match(es) played on 10 November 2026. Source: EFL
(A) Advances to a further round; (E) Eliminated

Win Draw Loss Fixtures

6 October 2026 Group stage	Exeter City	2–2 (4–3 p)	Oxford United	Exeter
19:00 BST	Perry 7'; Oakes (yellow card) 13'; Gordon 31'; Kite (yellow card) 51'; Alsop (yellow card) 90+2'	Report	Golding (yellow card) 28'; Bradney 30'; Fitzwater 78' (o.g.); Sibley (yellow card) 90+2'	Stadium: St James Park; Attendance: 1,469; Referee: James Durkin
	Penalties
	Scully (penalty scored); Cummins (penalty scored); Woodhouse (penalty scored); Fitzwater (penalty missed); Cayless (penalty scored)		O'Donkor (penalty scored); Sibley (penalty scored); Bradney (penalty missed); Snowden (penalty scored); Golding (penalty missed)

10 November 2026 Group stage	Oxford United	4–0	Cheltenham Town	Littlemore
19:00 GMT	Snowden 59'; O'Donkor 74', 90'; Jeon Jin-woo 82'	Report		Stadium: Kassam Stadium; Attendance: 860; Referee: Matthew Russell

24 November 2026 Group stage	Oxford United	v	Tottenham Hotspur U21	Littlemore
19:00 GMT				Stadium: Kassam Stadium

== Statistics ==
=== Appearances and goals ===
As of match played 10 November 2026

Players with no appearances are not included on the list, italics indicate a loaned in player

No.	Pos	Nat	Player	Total		League One		FA Cup		EFL Cup		EFL Trophy	
No.	Pos	Nat	Player	Apps	Goals	Apps	Goals	Apps	Goals	Apps	Goals	Apps	Goals
1	GK	(England) ENG	Jamie Cumming	11	0	8+0	0	0+0	0	1+0	0	2+0	0
2	DF	(England) ENG	Sam Long	9	0	3+2	0	1+0	0	1+0	0	2+0	0
3	DF	(Northern Ireland) NIR	Ciaron Brown	13	1	12+0	1	0+0	0	1+0	0	0+0	0
4	MF	(Wales) WAL	Kai Andrews	11	1	8+3	1	0+0	0	0+0	0	0+0	0
6	DF	(Poland) POL	Michał Helik	11	1	11+0	1	0+0	0	0+0	0	0+0	0
7	FW	(South Korea) KOR	Jeon Jin-woo	1	1	0+0	0	0+0	0	0+0	0	0+1	1
8	MF	(England) ENG	Cameron Brannagan	15	2	12+0	2	0+0	0	1+0	0	2+0	0
9	FW	(Wales) WAL	Mark Harris	14	6	12+1	6	0+0	0	1+0	0	0+0	0
10	FW	(Republic of Ireland) IRL	Aidomo Emakhu	10	0	3+4	0	0+1	0	1+0	0	1+0	0
11	MF	(Republic of Ireland) IRL	Tyler Goodrham	16	0	8+4	0	1+0	0	1+0	0	0+2	0
12	DF	(Netherlands) NED	Ruben Roosken	2	0	0+0	0	0+1	0	0+0	0	1+0	0
13	GK	(England) ENG	Simon Eastwood	8	0	5+2	0	1+0	0	0+0	0	0+0	0
15	DF	(Northern Ireland) NIR	Brodie Spencer	14	0	7+6	0	0+0	0	1+0	0	0+0	0
18	MF	(Northern Ireland) NIR	Jamie McDonnell	7	1	6+0	1	0+0	0	1+0	0	0+0	0
19	FW	(England) ENG	Gatlin O'Donkor	16	6	1+11	4	1+0	0	0+1	0	1+1	2
20	FW	(England) ENG	Luka Lynch	10	1	3+5	1	1+0	0	0+0	0	1+0	0
22	DF	(Jamaica) JAM	Greg Leigh	3	0	0+0	0	1+0	0	0+0	0	0+2	0
23	FW	(Scotland) SCO	Siriki Dembélé	15	2	13+0	2	0+0	0	1+0	0	1+0	0
25	DF	(Republic of Ireland) IRL	James Golding	3	0	0+0	0	1+0	0	0+0	0	2+0	0
26	DF	(England) ENG	Jack Currie	16	0	10+3	0	0+0	0	1+0	0	2+0	0
27	FW	(England) ENG	Leo Snowden	8	1	0+4	0	1+0	0	0+1	0	1+1	1
30	DF	(Democratic Republic of the Congo) COD	Peter Kioso	15	0	8+4	0	0+0	0	0+1	0	1+1	0
32	MF	(England) ENG	Louie Sibley	13	1	5+6	1	0+0	0	0+1	0	1+0	0
37	FW	(England) ENG	Aidan Elliott-Wheeler	3	0	0+0	0	0+0	0	0+1	0	1+1	0
44	MF	(England) ENG	Harrison Bradney	3	1	0+0	0	1+0	0	0+0	0	2+0	1
45	FW	(England) ENG	Jack Lee	1	0	0+0	0	0+1	0	0+0	0	0+0	0
46	DF	(England) ENG	Aaron Lacey	1	0	0+0	0	1+0	0	0+0	0	0+0	0
48	FW	(Wales) WAL	Louis Griffiths	1	0	0+0	0	0+0	0	0+0	0	1+0	0
54	MF	(England) ENG	Josh Holton	1	0	0+0	0	0+1	0	0+0	0	0+0	0
57	FW	(England) ENG	Mo Missanga	14	2	7+5	2	1+0	0	0+0	0	0+1	0
59	MF	(England) ENG	Maeson Vaughan	1	0	0+0	0	0+1	0	0+0	0	0+0	0
Players who featured but departed the club during the season:
17	MF	(England) ENG	Stanley Mills	1	0	0+1	0	0	0	0	0	0	0

== Awards ==
=== Manager awards ===
==== EFL League One Manager of the Month ====
Month	Manager	Result	Ref.
October	(Wales) Aaron Ramsey	Nominated	
