= John-Kymani Gordon =

English footballer (born 2003)

Personal information
- Full name: John-Kymani Linton Michael Gordon
- Date of birth: 13 February 2003 (age 23)
- Place of birth: Croydon, England
- Positions: Forward; winger

Team information
- Current team: Central Coast Mariners

Youth career
- 2011–2023: Crystal Palace

Senior career*
Years	Team	Apps	(Gls)
2023–2024	Crystal Palace	0	(0)
2023	→ Carlisle United (loan)	15	(2)
2023–2024	→ Cambridge United (loan)	14	(0)
2024	→ AFC Wimbledon (loan)	18	(1)
2024–2026	Colchester United	56	(3)
2026	→ Rochdale (loan)	4	(0)
2026–	Central Coast Mariners	2	(0)

International career
2018	England U16	3	(0)
- * Club domestic league appearances and goals as of 22 November 2026

John-Kymani Linton Michael Gordon (born 13 February 2003) is an English professional footballer who plays as a forward or winger for Central Coast Mariners.

== Early life ==
Gordon joined Crystal Palace at the age of eight having been scouted playing locally in Purley, London for the youth team Purley Panthers FC. He was promoted to the Crystal Palace under-18 squad aged 15 years-old, whilst also representing England under-16 against Croatia in the summer of 2018.

== Club career ==
=== Crystal Palace ===
Gordon signed his first professional contract with Crystal Palace in the summer of 2020, and signed a contract extension in December 2022. That month his performance for Crystal Palace against Trabzonspor in a friendly match reportedly impressed the scouts of their Turkish opponents. Gordon scored 11 times for the Crystal Palace reserve side in his first eight games of the 2022–23 developmental Premier League 2 league season, and won the Premier League 2 Player of the Month award in September 2022.

==== Loan to Carlisle United ====
In January 2023, Gordon joined Carlisle United on a six-month loan after being an unused substitute for five Palace games and appearing three times for the development team in the EFL Trophy. Gordon made his senior professional debut on 14 January for Carlisle United, scoring the second goal of the game against Newport County in a 2–0 League Two home win at Brunton Park. On 27 April he was banned for three games for violent conduct in a match against Barrow. He returned to start the League Two play-off final played at Wembley on 28 May, as Carlisle won promotion on penalties against Stockport County, following a 1–1 draw after extra-time.

==== Loan to Cambridge United ====
On 1 September 2023, Gordon joined League One club Cambridge United until January 2024. His return to his parent club was confirmed on 10 January 2024.

==== Loan to AFC Wimbledon ====
On 17 January 2024, Gordon joined League Two club AFC Wimbledon on loan until the end of the season. He scored his first goal for Wimbledon in a 1–1 draw at Crewe Alexandra on 23 March 2024.

Following the conclusion of the season, Crystal Palace announced that Gordon would be departing the club upon the expiration of his contract.

=== Colchester United ===
On 28 June 2024, Gordon agreed to join League Two side Colchester United on a two-year deal from 1 July.

On 27 March 2026, Gordon joined National League leaders Rochdale on loan for the remainder of the season. On 16 May 2026 the club announced he was being released.

== International career ==
Gordon has made three appearances for the England U16 team.

== Career statistics ==
=== Club ===
As of match played 7 March 2026

Appearances and goals by club, season and competition
Club	Season	League			FA Cup		EFL Cup		Other		Total	
Club	Season	Division	Apps	Goals	Apps	Goals	Apps	Goals	Apps	Goals	Apps	Goals
Crystal Palace U21	2021–22	—			—		—		3 (Note: Appearance(s) in EFL Trophy)	0	3	0
Crystal Palace U21	2022–23	—			—		—		3	2	3	2
Crystal Palace U21	Total		—		—		—		6	2	6	2
Crystal Palace	2022–23	Premier League	0	0	0	0	0	0	—		0	0
Crystal Palace	2023–24	Premier League	0	0	0	0	0	0	—		0	0
Crystal Palace	Total		0	0	0	0	0	0	—		0	0
Carlisle United (loan)	2022–23	League Two	15	2	—		—		2 (Note: Appearance(s) in League Two play-offs)	0	17	2
Cambridge United (loan)	2023–24	League One	14	0	2	0	—		3	0	19	0
AFC Wimbledon (loan)	2023–24	League Two	18	1	—		—		0	0	18	1
Colchester United	2024–25	League Two	41	3	1	0	2	0	4	0	48	3
Colchester United	2025–26	League Two	15	0	0	0	1	0	3	0	19	0
Colchester United	Total		56	3	1	0	3	0	7	0	67	3
Career total			103	6	3	0	3	0	18	2	127	8

== Honours ==
Carlisle United

- EFL League Two play-offs: 2023
