= Matt Macey =

English footballer (born 1994)

- Macey playing for Arsenal U21 in 2013

Personal information
- Full name: Matthew Ryan Macey
- Date of birth: 9 September 1994 (age 32)
- Place of birth: Bath, England
- Height: 6 ft 7 in (2.01 m)
- Position: Goalkeeper

Team information
- Current team: Wycombe Wanderers
- Number: 24

Youth career
- 2009–2013: Bristol Rovers
- 2013–2014: Arsenal

Senior career*
Years	Team	Apps	(Gls)
2014–2021	Arsenal	0	(0)
2015	→ Accrington Stanley (loan)	4	(0)
2017	→ Luton Town (loan)	11	(0)
2018–2019	→ Plymouth Argyle (loan)	34	(0)
2021–2022	Hibernian	35	(0)
2022–2023	Luton Town	0	(0)
2023	→ Portsmouth (loan)	21	(0)
2024	Portsmouth	0	(0)
2024–2026	Colchester United	71	(0)
2026–	Wycombe Wanderers	0	(0)
- * Club domestic league appearances and goals as of 26 January 2026 (UTC)

Matthew Ryan Macey (born 9 September 1994) is an English professional footballer who plays as a goalkeeper for EFL League One club Wycombe Wanderers.

== Career ==
=== Early career ===
Macey started to play youth football for Avon Arsenal Comets. In 2007, he applied but was rejected from Bristol Rovers' Centre of Excellence. Macey was also invited to train with Cardiff City but felt the travel commitment was too much. He then later went on to represent the youth teams of Bath City and Yate Town before Bristol Rovers signed him in 2009 before signing him as a full-time scholar in 2011. He first appeared in the Bristol Rovers squad for their League Two fixture against Torquay United in March 2012 but never made a first-team appearance for Bristol Rovers. He was however a part of their under-18 double-winning team. Macey was offered a professional contract at the end of the second year of his scholarship in the summer of 2013.

=== Arsenal and loan spells ===
On 23 October 2013, Macey signed for Arsenal after a trial with them. Arsenal beat off competition from Everton and a number of Championship clubs to sign Macey from Bristol Rovers. Due to his age, Arsenal also reportedly paid Bristol Rovers £100,000 in compensation for Macey after he had rejected an offer of a new contract at Bristol Rovers. In his first season at Arsenal, he was suggested as an immediate replacement for Łukasz Fabiański. In 2014, Macey was chosen to travel with Arsenal's first-team to a pre-season training camp in Austria and was later selected as a substitute for Arsenal's Premier League match against West Bromwich Albion.

On 8 January 2015, Macey signed for League Two club Accrington Stanley on a one-month loan. He made his Football League debut in a 3–0 defeat away to Tranmere Rovers on 17 January. Macey made his final appearance for Accrington in a 5–1 home defeat to Northampton Town on 31 January, and finished the loan with four appearances.

On 31 January 2017, Macey joined League Two club Luton Town on loan until the end of 2016–17. He debuted on 7 February in an EFL Trophy quarter-final tie against Yeovil Town, which Luton won 5–2. Macey went on to make his league debut four days later in a 2–1 win at home to Crawley Town. Macey was recalled by Arsenal on 5 April to provide cover for first-choice goalkeeper Petr Čech and second-choice goalkeeper David Ospina who were sidelined with a groin strain and an abdominal injury respectively, having made 13 appearances for Luton.

Macey made his debut for Arsenal on 24 October 2017 against Norwich City in the EFL Cup fourth round, with the match finishing a 2–1 victory after extra time. He made his European debut in the UEFA Europa League group stage nine days later, keeping a clean sheet in a 0–0 home draw against Red Star Belgrade. Macey signed a new contract of undisclosed length with Arsenal on 6 December.

Macey joined League One club Plymouth Argyle on 30 July 2018 on a season-long loan to replace the injured Harry Burgoyne. He made his debut in a 2–1 away defeat to Walsall five days later on the opening day of 2018–19. Macey was an ever-present in the team until he suffered a dead leg in a 2–1 defeat away to AFC Wimbledon on 26 December, and was deputised by Kyle Letheren in his absence.

Macey won the FA Cup by merit of being part of the Arsenal squad for the final against Chelsea on 1 August 2020.

=== Hibernian ===
On 8 January 2021, Macey left Arsenal to join Scottish club Hibernian until the end of the season. On 11 January, he made his debut in a 1–1 draw against Celtic in the Scottish Premiership. Macey played mainly in Scottish Cup matches for Hibernian during the rest of the season, and in May 2021 he signed a two-year contract with the club. He saved a penalty in the 2021 Scottish Cup Final, which Hibs lost 1–0 to St Johnstone.

=== Luton Town ===
On 22 June 2022, Macey returned to Championship club Luton Town on a permanent basis, for an undisclosed fee.

On 20 January 2023, Portsmouth announced the signing of Macey on loan for the remainder of the season. He played 21 times during this loan spell.

On 2 September 2023, Macey's departure from Luton Town was announced following the mutual termination of his contract.

=== Portsmouth ===
On 12 January 2024, Macey returned to League One leaders Portsmouth on a permanent basis, signing a contract until the end of the season. On 1 May 2024, Portsmouth said the player would be released in the summer when his contract expired.

=== Colchester United ===
On 31 May 2024, Macey agreed to join League Two side Colchester United on a two-year deal. On 16 May 2026, the club announced he would be released at the expiry of his contract on 30 June.

=== Wycombe Wanderers ===
On 9 June 2026, Macey agreed to join League One club Wycombe Wanderers, effective from 1 July.

== Career statistics ==
As of end of 2025–26 season

Appearances and goals by club, season and competition
Club	Season	League			FA Cup		EFL Cup		Other		Total	
Club	Season	Division	Apps	Goals	Apps	Goals	Apps	Goals	Apps	Goals	Apps	Goals
Arsenal	2014–15	Premier League	0	0	0	0	0	0	0	0	0	0
Arsenal	2015–16	Premier League	0	0	0	0	0	0	0	0	0	0
Arsenal	2016–17	Premier League	0	0	0	0	0	0	0	0	0	0
Arsenal	2017–18	Premier League	0	0	0	0	1	0	1 (Note: Appearance in UEFA Europa League)	0	2	0
Arsenal	2018–19	Premier League	0	0	0	0	0	0	0	0	0	0
Arsenal	2019–20	Premier League	0	0	0	0	0	0	0	0	0	0
Arsenal	2020–21	Premier League	0	0	0	0	0	0	0	0	0	0
Arsenal	Total		0	0	0	0	1	0	1	0	2	0
Accrington Stanley (loan)	2014–15	League Two	4	0	—		—		—		4	0
Luton Town (loan)	2016–17	League Two	11	0	—		—		2 (Note: Appearances in EFL Trophy)	0	13	0
Plymouth Argyle (loan)	2018–19	League One	34	0	2	0	2	0	0	0	38	0
Hibernian	2020–21	Scottish Premiership	3	0	5	0	0	0	—		8	0
Hibernian	2021–22	Scottish Premiership	32	0	4	0	4	0	4 (Note: Appearances in the UEFA Conference League)	0	44	0
Hibernian	Total		35	0	9	0	4	0	4	0	52	0
Luton Town	2022–23	Championship	0	0	0	0	1	0	0	0	1	0
Portsmouth (loan)	2022–23	League One	21	0	0	0	0	0	0	0	21	0
Portsmouth	2023–24	League One	0	0	0	0	0	0	0	0	0	0
Colchester United	2024–25	League Two	46	0	1	0	2	0	2 (Note: Appearances in EFL Trophy)	0	51	0
Colchester United	2025–26	League Two	45	0	1	0	1	0	0	0	47	0
Colchester United	Total		91	0	2	0	3	0	2	0	98	0
Career total			196	0	13	0	10	0	9	0	228	0

== Honours ==
Arsenal

- FA Cup: 2019–20
