= Jamie McDonnell (footballer) =

Northern Irish footballer (born 2004)

Personal information
- Full name: Jamie Carson McDonnell
- Date of birth: 16 February 2004 (age 22)
- Place of birth: Lisburn, Northern Ireland
- Height: 1.83 m (6 ft 0 in)
- Position: Defensive midfielder

Team information
- Current team: Oxford United
- Number: 18

Youth career
- Lisburn Youth
- Glentoran
- 2020–2024: Nottingham Forest

Senior career*
Years	Team	Apps	(Gls)
2024–2026	Nottingham Forest	0	(0)
2024–2025	→ Colchester United (loan)	32	(1)
2025–2026	→ Mansfield Town (loan)	19	(2)
2026–	Oxford United	17	(1)

International career
- Northern Ireland U17
- * Club domestic league appearances and goals as of 18:30, 19 September 2026 (UTC)

Jamie Carson McDonnell (born 16 February 2004) is a Northern Irish professional footballer who plays as a defensive midfielder for EFL League One club Oxford United and the Northern Ireland national team.

== Club career ==
Born in Lisburn, McDonnell began his career with Lisburn Youth and Glentoran, before signing for Nottingham Forest in July 2020, where he turned professional in February 2021 after turning 17. After captaining their under-18 team, he agreed a new contract with Forest in December 2022.

McDonnell signed on loan for Colchester United in August 2024.

On 18 July 2025, McDonnell joined Mansfield Town on a season-long loan. He was one of three Nottingham Forest youth players to sign for Mansfield, alongside Joe Gardner and Kyle McAdam.

On 18 January 2026, McDonnell signed for Oxford United on a "long term contract" for an undisclosed fee. The move resulted in a six-figure "windfall" for former club Glentoran. He scored his first goal for the club in a 4–0 away victory at Leicester City on 5 September 2026.

== International career ==
McDonell is a Northern Ireland under-17 youth international.

== Career statistics ==
As of match played on 19 September 2026

Appearances and goals by club, season and competition
Club	Season	League			FA Cup		EFL Cup		Other		Total	
Club	Season	Division	Apps	Goals	Apps	Goals	Apps	Goals	Apps	Goals	Apps	Goals
Nottingham Forest	2024–25	Premier League	0	0	0	0	0	0	0	0	0	0
Nottingham Forest	2025–26	Premier League	0	0	0	0	0	0	0	0	0	0
Nottingham Forest	Total		0	0	0	0	0	0	0	0	0	0
Colchester United (loan)	2024–25	League Two	32	1	1	0	0	0	4 (Note: Appearances in the EFL Trophy)	0	37	1
Mansfield Town (loan)	2025–26	League One	19	2	3	0	2	0	1	0	25	2
Oxford United	2025–26	Championship	11	0	1	0	0	0	0	0	12	0
Oxford United	2026–27	League One	6	1	0	0	1	0	0	0	7	1
Oxford United	Total		17	1	1	0	1	0	0	0	19	1
Career total			68	4	5	0	3	0	5	0	81	4
