= Owura Edwards =

English footballer (born 2001)

Personal information
- Full name: Owura Nsiah Edwards
- Date of birth: 10 April 2001 (age 25)
- Place of birth: Bristol, England
- Height: 5 ft 8 in (1.73 m)
- Position: Winger

Team information
- Current team: Peterborough United
- Number: 11

Youth career
- –2019: Newport County

Senior career*
Years	Team	Apps	(Gls)
2019	Newport County	0	(0)
2019	→ Mangotsfield United (loan)	3	(0)
2019–2023	Bristol City	3	(0)
2019–2020	→ Bath City (loan)	3	(0)
2020	→ Grimsby Town (loan)	17	(1)
2021–2022	→ Exeter City (loan)	10	(0)
2022	→ Colchester United (loan)	13	(3)
2022–2023	→ Ross County (loan)	28	(3)
2023–2026	Colchester United	79	(8)
2026–	Peterborough United	8	(2)
- * Club domestic league appearances and goals as of 15:00, 17 October 2026 (UTC)

Owura Nsiah Edwards (born 10 April 2001) is an English footballer who plays as a winger for EFL League One club Peterborough United.

Edwards started his career at Newport County and had a loan spell at Mangotsfield United prior to joining Bristol City in summer 2019. Following loan spells at Bath City and Grimsby Town, he made his first-team debut for Bristol City in January 2021. He joined Exeter City on loan for the 2021–22 season, but was recalled in January and spent the second half of the season on loan at Colchester United. In June 2022 he was signed on loan to Ross County.

== Career ==
=== Early career ===
Edwards started his career at Newport County, and joined Mangotsfield United on a work experience loan in February 2019. In summer 2019, Edwards joined Bristol City after they agreed a compensation fee with his previous youth team Newport County, and joined Bath City on a season-long loan. Edwards made his debut for Bath City on 3 September 2019 in a 3–0 victory over Hampton & Richmond Borough. He made 3 appearances across the 2019–20 season for Bath City.

=== Bristol City ===
On 5 September 2020, Edwards signed for League Two side Grimsby Town on a season-long loan deal. He made his professional debut for Grimsby Town the same day as a substitute in a 1–1 EFL Cup defeat to Morecambe, in which Grimsby lost 4–3 on penalties. He scored his first goal for the club on 13 October 2020 in a 3–1 League Two victory over Cheltenham Town. On 31 December 2020, following the departure of manager Ian Holloway, Edwards and fellow Bristol City teammate James Morton were recalled from their loan spells at Grimsby. Edwards made 11 starts during his time at Blundell Park, scoring 1 goal. Edwards made his debut for Bristol City on 23 January 2021 as an 80th-minute substitute for Zak Vyner in a 3–0 FA Cup win over Millwall. He made his Championship debut in a 1–0 defeat to Derby County a week later and two further Championship appearances before the end of the 2020–21 season. In May 2021, he signed a two-year contract with the option of a further year.

On 20 August 2021, Edwards joined League Two side Exeter City on loan for the duration of the 2021–22 season. He made his debut for the club on 21 August 2021 in a 4–1 win over Bristol Rovers. After 10 league appearances, Edwards' was recalled from his loan spell with the Grecians on 14 January 2022, and three days later, he moved on loan to their divisional rivals Colchester United. He scored on his debut for Colchester in the third minute of a 3–2 defeat to Sutton United with a "right-foot shot from 25 yards". He made 12 appearances and scored three goals before suffering a knee injury in a 1–0 defeat to Bristol Rovers on 15 March, which saw him return to his parent club for treatment. He made 1 further appearance as a substitute in a 3–0 win over Bradford City.

On 26 June 2022, he joined Scottish Premiership side Ross County on loan for the 2022–23 season.

=== Colchester United ===
On 1 September 2023, Edwards re-joined Colchester United on a permanent deal.

=== Peterborough United ===
On 30 June 2026, Edwards signed for EFL League One side Peterborough United for a free transfer on a two year deal with an option for a third.

== Personal life ==
Born in England, Edwards is of Ghanaian descent. He is the younger brother of fellow footballer Opi Edwards.

== Career statistics ==
As of 21 January 2025

Appearances and goals by club, season and competition
Club	Season	League			National cup		League cup		Other		Total	
Club	Season	Division	Apps	Goals	Apps	Goals	Apps	Goals	Apps	Goals	Apps	Goals
Newport County	2018–19	League Two	0	0	0	0	0	0	0	0	0	0
Mangotsfield United (loan)	2018–19	Southern League Division One South	3	0	0	0	—		0	0	3	0
Bristol City	2019–20	Championship	0	0	0	0	0	0	—		0	0
Bristol City	2020–21	Championship	3	0	1	0	0	0	—		4	0
Bristol City	2021–22	Championship	0	0	0	0	0	0	—		0	0
Bristol City	Total		6	0	1	0	0	0	0	0	7	0
Bath City (loan)	2019–20	National League South	3	0	1	0	—		0	0	4	0
Grimsby Town (loan)	2020–21	League Two	17	1	0	0	1	0	2 (Note: Appearance(s) in EFL Trophy)	0	20	1
Exeter City (loan)	2021–22	League Two	10	0	3	0	0	0	4	0	17	0
Colchester United (loan)	2021–22	League Two	13	3	0	0	0	0	0	0	13	3
Ross County (loan)	2022–23	Scottish Premiership	28	3	1	0	5	2	—		34	5
Ross County (loan)	Total		71	7	5	0	6	2	6	0	88	9
Colchester United	2023–24	League Two	6	0	0	0	0	0	1	0	7	0
Colchester United	2024–25	League Two	37	7	0	0	2	0	3	0	42	7
Colchester United	2025-26	League Two	3	0	0	0	1	0	0	0	4	0
Colchester United	Total		46	7	0	0	3	0	4	0	53	7
Career total			123	14	6	0	9	2	10	0	148	16
