= Donell Thomas =

English footballer (born 2003)

Personal information
- Full name: Donell Tyrell Arnold Thomas
- Date of birth: 4 August 2003 (age 23)
- Place of birth: Hackney, London, England
- Height: 6 ft 1 in (1.85 m)
- Position: Midfielder

Team information
- Current team: Folkestone Invicta

Youth career
- Colchester United

Senior career*
| Years | Team | Apps | (Gls) |
| 2022–2024 | Colchester United | 2 | (0) |
| 2022–2023 | → Bishop's Stortford (loan) | 26 | (3) |
| 2024 | Bowers & Pitsea | 1 | (0) |
| 2024–2025 | Cheshunt | 19 | (1) |
| 2025– | Folkestone Invicta | 0 | (0) |
- * Club domestic league appearances and goals as of 21:49, 24 July 2025 (UTC)

Donell Tyrell Arnold Thomas (born 4 August 2003) is an English professional footballer who plays as a midfielder for National League South club Folkestone Invicta.

== Career ==
Thomas began his youth career at Tottenham Hotspur, before joining the academy at Colchester United, where he made his first-team debut on March 21, 2022, when he came on as an 85th-minute substitute for Brendan Sarpong-Wiredu in a 1–0 defeat to Forest Green Rovers at Brunton Park. Manager Wayne Brown said that "it's always tough asking a young lad to come on and make an impact but I thought he did that". On 2 September 2022, he joined Bishop's Stortford of the Isthmian League Premier Division on loan until 4 January.

In September 2024, Thomas joined Isthmian League Premier Division club Bowers & Pitsea.

In July 2025, Thomas joined Folkestone Invicta.

== Career statistics ==
As of end of 2024–25 season

Appearances and goals by club, season and competition
| Club | Season | League | | | FA Cup | | EFL Cup | | Other | | Total | |
| Club | Season | Division | Apps | Goals | Apps | Goals | Apps | Goals | Apps | Goals | Apps | Goals |
|---|---|---|---|---|---|---|---|---|---|---|---|---|
| Colchester United | 2021–22 | EFL League Two | 1 | 0 | 0 | 0 | 0 | 0 | 0 | 0 | 1 | 0 |
| Colchester United | 2022–23 | EFL League Two | 0 | 0 | 0 | 0 | 0 | 0 | 0 | 0 | 0 | 0 |
| Colchester United | 2023–24 | League Two | 1 | 0 | 0 | 0 | 0 | 0 | 2 (Note: Appearance(s) in EFL Trophy) | 0 | 3 | 0 |
| Colchester United | Total | | 2 | 0 | 0 | 0 | 0 | 0 | 2 | 0 | 4 | 0 |
| Bishop's Stortford (loan) | 2022–23 | Isthmian League Premier Division | 26 | 3 | 1 | 0 | — | | 2 (Note: Appearance(s) in the FA Trophy) | 0 | 29 | 3 |
| Bowers & Pitsea | 2024–25 | Isthmian League Premier Division | 1 | 0 | 0 | 0 | — | | 2 (Note: One appearance in FA Trophy, one appearance in Alan Turvey Trophy) | 0 | 3 | 0 |
| Cheshunt | 2024–25 | Isthmian League Premier Division | 19 | 1 | 0 | 0 | — | | 2 (Note: Appearance(s) in Herts Senior Cup) | 0 | 21 | 1 |
| Career total | | | 48 | 4 | 1 | 0 | 0 | 0 | 8 | 0 | 57 | 4 |
