= Alfie Bendle =

British footballer (born 2005)

Personal information
- Full name: Alfie Joshua Bendle
- Date of birth: 27 January 2005 (age 21)
- Place of birth: Eastbourne, England
- Position: Midfielder

Team information
- Current team: Spalding United

Youth career
- 2011–2012: 1st Touch Football Academy
- 2012–2021: Brighton and Hove Albion
- 2021: Lewes
- 2021–2022: AFC Wimbledon

Senior career*
Years	Team	Apps	(Gls)
2022–2023	AFC Wimbledon	9	(0)
2021–2022	→ Corinthian-Casuals (loan)	32	(5)
2023	→ Eastbourne Borough (loan)	11	(0)
2023–2024	Forest Green Rovers	5	(0)
2024	→ Eastbourne Borough (loan)	15	(1)
2024–2025	Colchester United	0	(0)
2024–2025	→ Chelmsford City (loan)	10	(0)
2025	→ St Albans City (loan)	22	(3)
2025–	Spalding United	0	(0)
- * Club domestic league appearances and goals as of 12:05, 10 August 2025 (UTC)

Alfie Joshua Bendle (born 27 January 2005) is an English professional footballer who plays as a central midfielder for National League North club Spalding United.

== Career ==
=== AFC Wimbledon ===
Bendle, who had previously played youth football with Brighton and Hove Albion and spent time on loan with Corinthian-Casuals, signed a professional contract for AFC Wimbledon on his seventeenth birthday.

Bendle made his professional debut in the final game of the 2021–22 EFL League One season at home at Plough Lane on 30 April 2022 against Accrington Stanley in a 4–3 defeat that confirmed Wimbledon's relegation to EFL League Two.

The next season, Bendle came on in the 88th minute for Ethan Chislett against Gillingham on 30 July 2022.

On 20 January 2023, it was announced that Bendle would join National League South club Eastbourne Borough on loan until the end of the season. Bendle was recalled early from his loan, after making 11 appearances for Borough, due to an injury crisis at Wimbledon.

=== Forest Green Rovers ===
Bendle signed for Forest Green Rovers in August 2023 for a free transfer, with Wimbledon inserting a sell-on clause into the deal.

On 2 February 2024, Bendle joined hometown club Eastbourne Borough on an initial one-month loan, making this his second spell at the club.

=== Colchester United ===
On 3 August 2024, Bendle returned to League Two following Forest Green Rovers' relegation, joining Colchester United on a one-year deal.

On 26 October 2024, Bendle joined fellow Essex side Chelmsford City on loan. On 10 January 2025, he joined National League South side St Albans City on loan for the remainder of the season.

Bendle was released by Colchester United upon the expiration of his contract at the end of the 2024–25 season.

=== Non-League ===
In August 2025, Bendle joined Southern League Premier Division Central club Spalding United.

== Career statistics ==
As of end of 2024–25 season

Appearances and goals by club, season and competition
Club	Season	Division	League		FA Cup		League Cup		Other		Total	
Club	Season	Division	Apps	Goals	Apps	Goals	Apps	Goals	Apps	Goals	Apps	Goals
AFC Wimbledon	2021–22	League One	1	0	0	0	0	0	0	0	1	0
AFC Wimbledon	2022–23	League Two	8	0	3	0	0	0	5 (Note: Appearance(s) in EFL Trophy)	0	16	0
AFC Wimbledon	Total		9	0	3	0	0	0	5	0	17	0
Corinthian-Casuals (loan)	2021–22	Isthmian League; Premier Division	32	5	8	1	—		3 (Note: One appearance in FA Trophy, one appearance in Surrey Senior Cup, one appearance in Velocity Cup)	0	43	6
Eastbourne Borough (loan)	2022–23	National League South	11	0	0	0	—		0	0	11	0
Forest Green Rovers	2023–24	League Two	5	0	1	0	0	0	3	0	8	0
Eastbourne Borough (loan)	2023–24	National League South	15	1	0	0	—		0	0	15	1
Colchester United	2024–25	League Two	0	0	0	0	0	0	1	0	1	0
Chelmsford City (loan)	2024–25	National League South	10	0	0	0	—		1 (Note: Appearance(s) in FA Trophy)	0	11	0
St Albans City (loan)	2024–25	National League South	22	3	0	0	—		0	0	22	3
Career total			104	9	12	1	0	0	13	0	128	10
