= Todd Miller (footballer) =

English footballer (born 2002)

Personal information
- Full name: Todd Owen Miller
- Date of birth: 1 October 2002 (age 24)
- Height: 1.78 m (5 ft 10 in)
- Position: Winger

Youth career
- –2016: Dagenham & Redbridge
- 2016–2019: Colchester United
- 2019–2023: Brighton & Hove Albion

Senior career*
Years	Team	Apps	(Gls)
2019	Colchester United	1	(0)
2019–2023	Brighton & Hove Albion	0	(0)
2023	→ Doncaster Rovers (loan)	11	(0)
2023–2024	Bromley	13	(1)
2024	→ Kidderminster Harriers (loan)	4	(0)
2024–2025	Wealdstone	3	(0)
2024–2025	→ Billericay Town (loan)	9	(2)
- * Club domestic league appearances and goals as of 17:54, 14 March 2025 (UTC)

Todd Owen Miller (born 1 October 2002) is a professional footballer who plays as a winger.

== Career ==
=== Colchester United ===
Miller joined Colchester United from Dagenham & Redbridge at under-14 level. He was called up to the Colchester United first-team squad for the first time in March 2019 after impressing manager John McGreal. He was handed the shirt number 47. He earned a place on the bench for Colchester's League Two trip to Exeter City on 16 March 2019. He made his debut from the substitutes bench, coming on as an 87th-minute substitute for Courtney Senior in the 3–0 defeat for the U's. He became Colchester's youngest-ever first-team player when he came on at the age of 16 years and 166 days, surpassing the previous record held by Lindsay Smith by 48 days.

=== Brighton & Hove Albion ===
On 19 July 2019, Miller joined the academy and development squad of Premier League side Brighton & Hove Albion for an undisclosed fee, signing a three-year contract.

On 13 January 2023, Miller joined EFL League Two side Doncaster Rovers on loan for the remainder of the 2022-23 season.

On 16 June 2023, Miller was released from his contract with Brighton without making a senior appearance for the Premier League side.

=== Bromley ===
Miller signed for National League side Bromley on 26 August 2023.

In February 2024, Miller joined fellow National League club Kidderminster Harriers on loan for the remainder of the season.

=== Wealdstone ===
On 25 June 2024, Miller signed for National League club Wealdstone.

On 16 November 2024, Miller joined Isthmian League Premier Division side Billericay Town on loan.

On 13 March 2025, Miller left the club by mutual consent.

== Career statistics ==
As of 13 March 2025

Appearances and goals by club, season and competition
Club	Season	League			FA Cup		League Cup		Other		Total	
Club	Season	Division	Apps	Goals	Apps	Goals	Apps	Goals	Apps	Goals	Apps	Goals
Colchester United	2018–19	League Two	1	0	0	0	0	0	0	0	1	0
Brighton & Hove Albion U23	2021–22	—			—		—		2 (Note: Appearances in EFL Trophy)	0	2	0
Brighton & Hove Albion U23	2022–23	—			—		—		2	2	2	2
Brighton & Hove Albion U23	Total		—		—		—		4	2	4	2
Doncaster Rovers (loan)	2022–23	League Two	11	0	—		—		—		11	0
Bromley	2023–24	National League	13	1	1	0	—		0	0	14	1
Kidderminster Harriers (loan)	2023–24	National League	4	0	0	0	—		0	0	4	0
Wealdstone	2024–25	National League	3	0	0	0	—		1 (Note: Appearance(s) in National League Cup)	0	4	0
Billericay Town (loan)	2024–25	Isthmian League Premier Division	9	2	0	0	—		1 (Note: Appearance(s) in Alan Turvey Trophy)	0	10	2
Career total			41	3	1	0	0	0	6	2	48	5
