= Brennan Dickenson =

English footballer (born 1993)

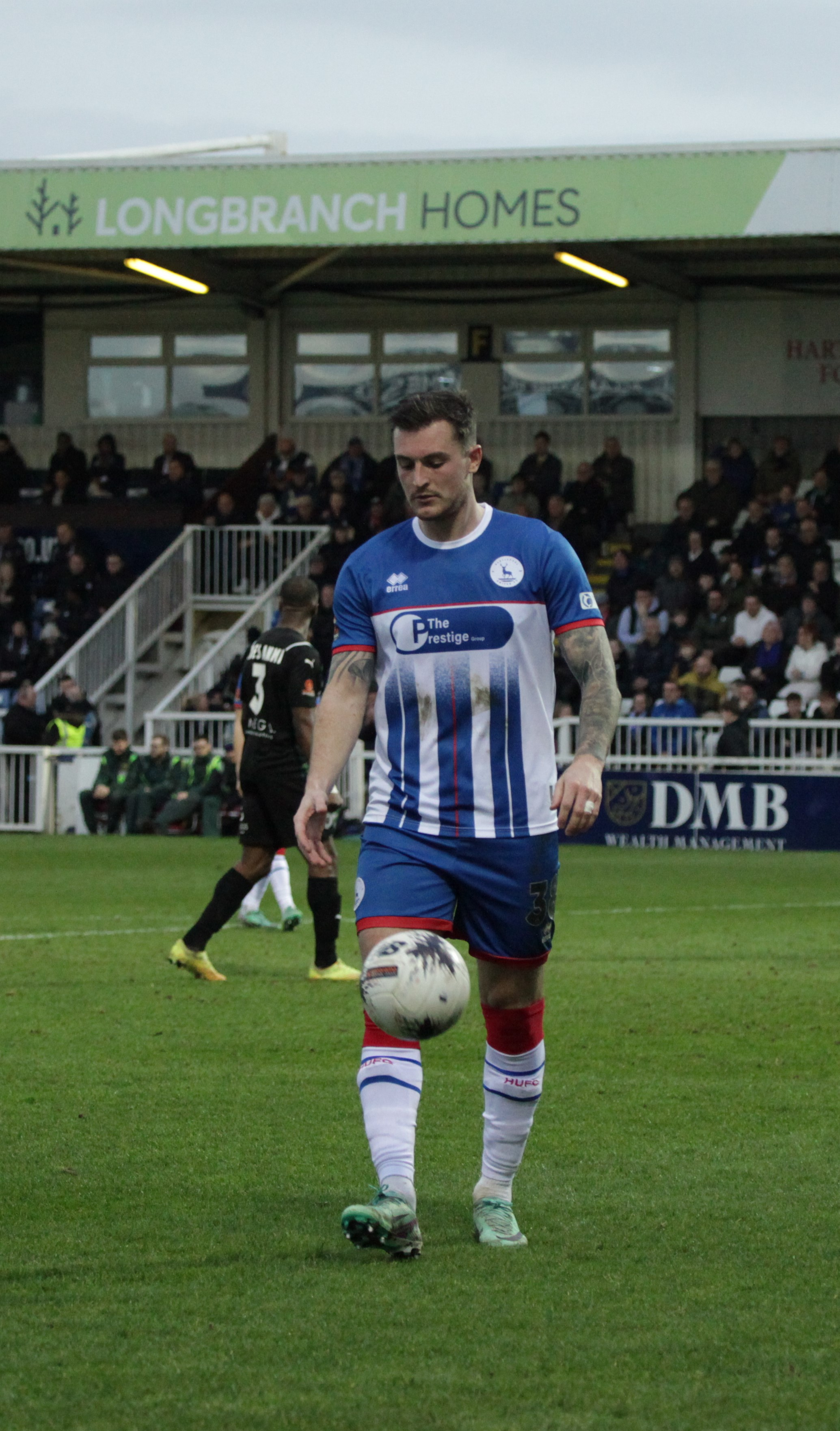
- Dickenson walking to take a corner for Hartlepool United

Personal information
- Full name: Brennan Peter Dickenson
- Date of birth: 26 February 1993 (age 33)
- Place of birth: Ferndown, England
- Height: 1.84 m (6 ft 0 in)
- Position: Midfielder

Team information
- Current team: Workington

Youth career
- Southampton

Senior career*
Years	Team	Apps	(Gls)
2011–2012	Dorchester Town	22	(5)
2012–2014	Brighton & Hove Albion	0	(0)
2012	→ Chesterfield (loan)	11	(1)
2013	→ AFC Wimbledon (loan)	7	(2)
2014	→ Northampton Town (loan)	13	(1)
2014–2016	Gillingham	67	(2)
2016–2019	Colchester United	85	(15)
2019–2020	Milton Keynes Dons	7	(0)
2020	Exeter City	10	(2)
2020–2023	Carlisle United	51	(3)
2023–2024	Oldham Athletic	15	(5)
2024	→ Hartlepool United (loan)	6	(0)
2024–2026	Queen of the South	45	(6)
2026–	Workington	12	(4)
- * Club domestic league appearances and goals as of 17:58, 11 October 2026 (UTC)

Brennan Peter Dickenson (born 26 February 1993) is an English professional footballer who plays as a midfielder for Northern Premier League Premier Division club Workington.

Dickenson's career began at Southampton before moving on to Conference South side Dorchester Town. He earned a move to Championship side Brighton & Hove Albion in 2012. He failed to break into the Brighton first team, instead heading out on loan to Chesterfield, AFC Wimbledon and Northampton Town. He was released in 2014, joining League One side Gillingham. He joined Colchester United after two seasons with the Kent club. With Colchester, he won the club's Player of the Year award in his first season. After three seasons with Colchester, he had spells with Milton Keynes Dons and Exeter City before moving to Carlisle United in 2020. He spent three seasons in total with Carlisle before signing with Oldham Athletic in 2023. Dickenson signed on loan with Hartlepool United in 2024.

== Career ==
=== Brighton & Hove Albion ===
Born in Ferndown, former Southampton trainee Dickenson signed for Championship club Brighton & Hove Albion in January 2012 for an undisclosed fee from Dorchester Town. He had scored five goals in 22 Conference South games during the first half of the 2011–12 season. He joined League Two side Chesterfield on a one-month loan deal on 8 November 2012. He scored on his professional debut on 10 November after replacing Mark Randall 61-minutes into a 3–2 defeat by Bristol Rovers. He made five starts and six substitute appearances during his time with the Spireites.

AFC Wimbledon signed Dickenson on loan for one-month in February 2013. He made his debut on 23 February in Wimbledon's 1–0 win at Dagenham & Redbridge, before scoring in consecutive games, first against Cheltenham Town in a 2–1 defeat, and then a week later in a 3–2 home win over York City. In all, Dickenson made seven appearances for the Dons, before agreeing a one-year contract extension with Brighton at the end of the season.

Still without a first-team appearance for Brighton, Dickenson was allowed to leave on loan for League Two once again, this time for Northampton Town until the end of the 2013–14 season on 8 February 2014. He made his debut the same day as Northampton fell to a 2–0 home defeat by Plymouth Argyle. He scored one goal for the club, in a 2–0 win against Hartlepool United on 22 February, and made 13 league appearances.

In May 2014, Dickenson had a contract clause invoked extending his contract by one season.

=== Gillingham ===
Gillingham paid an undisclosed fee to bring Dickenson to the League One club on a two-year contract on 30 June 2014, just weeks after extending his Brighton contract. He made his debut on 9 August 2014 as a 77th-minute substitute for Jake Hessenthaler in Gillingham's 4–2 defeat to Milton Keynes Dons. He scored in his second game in his first start for the club with a first-half goal against Yeovil Town in the League Cup. He was withdrawn at half-time after picking up a slight injury. He made 42 appearances during the season, scoring three goals.

Bradley Garmston ousted Dickenson from the left-back position which he had become accustomed to playing for Gillingham by November 2015, with manager Justin Edinburgh saying that "choosing between them is probably the most difficult decision." Dickenson had made 18 appearances from August through early November, but found his opportunities limited until March 2016, when a return to first-team action eventually yielded 36 appearances in total. Dickenson was released by Gillingham in May 2016.

=== Colchester United ===
After being released by Gillingham, Dickenson joined League Two side Colchester United on a two-year contract. He made his debut for Colchester on 9 August 2016 in their 4–0 EFL Cup defeat to his former club Brighton, before scoring his first goal on his league debut four days later in Colchester's 2–0 win at home to Cambridge United. His performance was recognised by the English Football League when he was named in the 'Team of the Week' for all three divisions. He scored a brace in his next match on 16 August as he helped his side to a 3–2 win over Grimsby Town at the Colchester Community Stadium. As a result of his performance, he was named in the EFL 'Team of the Week' for the second week in succession. He was also nominated for the League Two 'Player of the Month' award after three goals and an assist in his four league appearances in August.

After a goal in each of Colchester's wins against Stevenage and Cheltenham Town either side of New Year, Dickenson was named in the EFL 'Team of New Year' on 3 January 2017. Having firmly established himself as a regular starter as a left wing-back in the Colchester first-team, Dickenson said that "the spell I'm having at the moment is probably the best in my career. I've had a few good seasons but this is probably the best." Dickenson then sustained cruciate ligament damage in April 2017 which would rule him out of action for up to nine months. In his first season with the club, after scoring 12 goals in 39 appearances, he was named Player of the Year alongside the Players' Player of the Year award.

Dickenson revealed in July 2017 that his injury sustained in April would likely keep him out of first-team action until February 2018. He made his first appearance of the 2017–18 season on 13 February 2018, replacing Kane Vincent-Young during Colchester's 2–1 win against Coventry City. At the end of the season, Dickenson took up the option on his contract to remain with Colchester for a further year until at least summer 2019. Dickenson scored his first goals since April 2017 when he scored a brace against Crewe Alexandra in a 6–0 win on 21 August 2018.

=== Milton Keynes Dons ===
Dickenson turned down a new contract offer from Colchester, and on 30 May 2019 joined newly-promoted League One club Milton Keynes Dons on a free transfer effective from 1 July 2019. He scored his first goal for MK Dons when he scored in an EFL Trophy tie against Wycombe Wanderers on 12 November 2019.

=== Exeter City ===
On 17 January 2020, following the mutual termination of his contract with MK Dons, Dickenson joined League Two club Exeter City on a short-term deal until the end of the season in response to Jack Sparkes sustaining a season-ending knee injury against Newport County on Boxing Day 2019 and other left sided players also being injured. He made his league debut in a 1–0 away win against Grimsby Town at Blundell Park. He scored his first goal for the club in a 5–1 win over Oldham Athletic, scoring directly from a 35-yard free kick. Dickenson was released by Exeter at the end of his contract in July 2020.

=== Carlisle United ===
Dickenson joined Carlisle United on a free transfer on 13 August 2020. Dickenson signed a new one-year contract in May 2022.

=== Oldham Athletic ===
On 3 August 2023, Dickinson joined National League club Oldham Athletic, signing a one-year contract.

On 2 February 2024, Dickenson signed on loan with fellow National League side, Hartlepool United until the end of the 2023–24 season.

=== Queen of the South ===
In July 2024, following his release by Oldham Athletic, Dickenson signed a two-year contract with Queen of the South of Scottish League One.

=== Workington ===
On 8 August 2026, Dickenson joined Northern Premier League Premier Division club Workington on a two-year deal.

== Style of play ==
Chesterfield manager Paul Cook described Dickenson as "a very energetic, left-sided midfielder or left-sided striker who will bring a lot of balance to the team and a lot of energy going forward". He played at left-back for Gillingham, keeping regular left-back Bradley Garmston out of the first-team.

== Career statistics ==
As of match played 10 October 2026

Appearances and goals by club, season and competition
Club	Season	League			National cup (Note: Includes Scottish Cup, FA Cup)		League cup (Note: Includes Scottish League Cup, EFL Cup)		Other		Total	
Club	Season	Division	Apps	Goals	Apps	Goals	Apps	Goals	Apps	Goals	Apps	Goals
Dorchester Town	2011–12	Conference South	22	5	0	0	–		0	0	22	5
Brighton & Hove Albion	2012–13	Championship	0	0	0	0	0	0	0	0	0	0
Brighton & Hove Albion	2013–14	Championship	0	0	0	0	0	0	0	0	0	0
Brighton & Hove Albion	Total		0	0	0	0	0	0	0	0	0	0
Chesterfield (loan)	2012–13	League Two	11	1	0	0	0	0	0	0	11	1
AFC Wimbledon (loan)	2012–13	League Two	7	2	0	0	0	0	0	0	7	2
Northampton Town (loan)	2013–14	League Two	13	1	0	0	0	0	0	0	13	1
Gillingham	2014–15	League One	34	1	1	0	1	1	6 (Note: Appearance(s) in Football League Trophy)	1	42	3
Gillingham	2015–16	League One	33	1	1	0	1	0	1	0	36	1
Gillingham	Total		67	2	2	0	2	1	7	1	78	4
Colchester United	2016–17	League Two	36	12	0	0	1	0	2 (Note: Appearance(s) in EFL Trophy)	0	39	12
Colchester United	2017–18	League Two	7	0	0	0	0	0	0	0	7	0
Colchester United	2018–19	League Two	42	3	1	0	1	0	3	0	47	3
Colchester United	Total		85	15	1	0	2	0	5	0	93	15
Milton Keynes Dons	2019–20	League One	7	0	1	0	1	0	4	1	13	1
Exeter City	2019–20	League Two	10	2	—		—		—		13	2
Carlisle United	2020–21	League Two	12	1	0	0	0	0	0	0	12	1
Carlisle United	2021–22	League Two	39	2	1	0	1	0	2	0	42	2
Carlisle United	Total		51	3	1	0	2	0	2	0	55	3
Oldham Athletic	2023–24	National League	15	5	2	0	0	0	1 (Note: Appearance in FA Trophy)	0	18	5
Hartlepool United (loan)	2023–24	National League	6	0	0	0	0	0	0	0	6	0
Queen of the South	2024–25	Scottish League One	22	2	1	1	4	1	1	0	28	4
Queen of the South	2025–26	Scottish League One	23	4	1	0	0	0	4	1	28	5
Queen of the South	Total		45	6	2	1	4	1	5	1	56	9
Workington	2026–27	NPL Premier Division	12	4	1	0	–		1	0	14	4
Career total			316	41	9	1	9	2	24	3	358	47

== Honours ==
Individual

- Colchester United Player of the Year: 2016–17
- Colchester United Players' Player of the Year: 2016–17
