= Paul Rooney (footballer) =

Irish association footballer

Personal information
- Full name: Paul Laurence Michael Rooney
- Date of birth: 22 March 1997 (age 29)
- Place of birth: Dublin, Ireland
- Height: 1.93 m (6 ft 4 in)
- Position: Defender

Team information
- Current team: Havant & Waterlooville

Youth career
- 2014–2015: St Patrick's Athletic

Senior career*
Years	Team	Apps	(Gls)
2015	St Patrick's Athletic	0	(0)
2016	Bohemians	0	(0)
2016–2018	Millwall	0	(0)
2016–2017	→ Torquay United (loan)	6	(1)
2018–2019	Colchester United	0	(0)
2018	→ Bromley (loan)	5	(0)
2018–2019	→ Billericay Town (loan)	17	(0)
2019–2021	Dover Athletic	21	(1)
2021–2023	Havant & Waterlooville	54	(4)
2023–2024	Dartford	38	(3)
2025–2026	Havant & Waterlooville	9	(1)
2026–	Stockton Town	0	(0)
- * Club domestic league appearances and goals as of 16:38, 23 June 2026 (UTC)

Paul Laurence Michael Rooney (born 22 March 1997) is an Irish professional footballer who plays as a defender for Northern Premier League Premier League side Stockton Town.

He spent his early senior career in his native Ireland at St Patrick's Athletic and Bohemians before signing for the English club Millwall. He had a loan spell at Torquay United during the 2016–17 season and made a permanent switch to Colchester United in January 2018. He joined Bromley on a short-term loan deal in September 2018 and then Billericay Town on another loan in November 2018. He was released by Colchester at the end of his contract in the summer of 2019.

== Career ==
Born in Dublin, Ireland, Rooney came through the youth setup at St Patrick's Athletic. He was a part of the team that won the national under-19 league in 2015 by beating Derry City 3–2 in the final in Buncrana.

His debut in senior football was on 22 September 2015, a 1–0 loss against Dundalk in the semi-final of the Leinster Senior Cup at Richmond Park. Rooney went on to be an unused substitute in another nine games for Pats in the 2015 season. He signed for Dublin rivals Bohemians ahead of the 2016 League of Ireland season. He made two appearances for the club, a 4–3 win over Dundalk, and a 1–0 win over UCD, both in the Leinster Senior Cup.

Rooney signed for English club Millwall in July 2016. He made his Millwall debut on 8 November 2016 in a 3–1 win away to Luton Town in the Football League Trophy.

On 8 December 2016, Rooney signed a 28-day loan deal with National League club Torquay United. His loan was extended by a further 28 days on 6 January 2017.

On 24 January 2018, Rooney signed for League Two side Colchester United on a one-and-a-half-year deal. He was called up to the first-team squad for the first time ahead of Colchester's League Two game against Yeovil Town on 17 March. He was given squad number 46.

On 4 September 2018, Rooney made his Colchester United debut starting in their 2–0 defeat by Southampton Under-21s in the EFL Trophy.

On 28 September 2018, Rooney joined National League side Bromley on loan in an initial month-long deal. He made his debut on 29 September in Bromley's 2–2 draw with FC Halifax Town.

After his Bromley loan ended in November, Rooney joined National League South side Billericay Town on loan on 30 November. He made his debut on 1 December in a 3–2 defeat to Oxford City. His loan was extended until the end of the season on 4 January 2019.

On 14 May 2019, it was announced Rooney was to leave Colchester United at the end of his contract.

In June 2019, he signed for Dover Athletic. Following's Dover's decision to not play any more matches in the 2020–21 season, made in late January, and subsequent null and voiding of all results, on 5 May 2021 it was announced that Rooney was out of contract and had left the club.

On 22 May 2021, Rooney joined National League South side Havant & Waterlooville.

On 25 May 2023, Rooney joined Dartford.

On 3 October 2025, Rooney returned to Southern League Premier Division South club Havant & Waterlooville.

On 23 June 2026, Rooney moved to Stockton Town of the Northern Premier League, Premier League.

== Career statistics ==
As of 26 December 2025

Appearances and goals by club, season and competition
Club	Season	League			National Cup		League Cup		Other		Total	
Club	Season	Division	Apps	Goals	Apps	Goals	Apps	Goals	Apps	Goals	Apps	Goals
St Patrick's Athletic	2015	LOI Premier Division	0	0	0	0	0	0	1 (Note: Appearance(s) in Leinster Senior Cup)	0	1	0
Bohemians	2016	LOI Premier Division	0	0	0	0	0	0	2	0	2	0
Millwall	2016–17	League One	0	0	0	0	0	0	1 (Note: Appearance in EFL Trophy)	0	1	0
Millwall	2017–18	Championship	0	0	0	0	0	0	0	0	0	0
Millwall	Total		0	0	0	0	0	0	1	0	1	0
Torquay United (loan)	2016–17	National League	6	1	0	0	–		1 (Note: Appearance in FA Trophy)	0	7	1
Colchester United	2017–18	League Two	0	0	0	0	0	0	0	0	0	0
Colchester United	2018–19	League Two	0	0	0	0	0	0	1	0	1	0
Colchester United	Total		0	0	0	0	0	0	1	0	1	0
Bromley (loan)	2018–19	National League	5	0	1	0	–		0	0	6	0
Billericay Town (loan)	2018–19	National League South	17	0	0	0	–		1	0	18	0
Dover Athletic	2019–20	National League	18	1	3	0	–		0	0	21	1
Dover Athletic	2020–21	National League	3	0	0	0	—		1	0	4	0
Dover Athletic	Total		21	1	3	0	—		1	0	25	1
Havant & Waterlooville	2021–22	National League South	25	0	3	0	–		1	0	25	0
Havant & Waterlooville	2022–23	National League South	29	4	0	0	—		0	0	29	4
Havant & Waterlooville	Total		54	4	3	0	—		1	0	58	4
Dartford	2023–24	National League South	38	3	1	0	–		6 (Note: Three appearances in the London Senior Cup) (Note: One appearance in the FA Trophy) (Note: Two appearances in the Kent Senior Cup)	0	45	3
Havant & Waterlooville	2025–26	Southern League Premier Division South	9	1	0	0	–		0	0	9	1
Career total			150	10	8	0	0	0	15	0	173	10
