= 2018–19 Colchester United F.C. season =

Colchester United F.C.
2018–19 season
- Owner: Robbie Cowling
- Chairman: Robbie Cowling
- Head coach: John McGreal
- Stadium: Colchester Community Stadium
- League Two: 8th
- FA Cup: 1st round (eliminated by Accrington Stanley)
- EFL Cup: 1st round (eliminated by Cheltenham Town)
- EFL Trophy: Group stage
- Top goalscorer: League: Sammie Szmodics (14); All: Sammie Szmodics (15)
- Highest home attendance: 5,032 v Stevenage, 26 December 2018
- Lowest home attendance: 532 v Southampton U21, 4 September 2018
- Average home league attendance: 3,361
- Biggest win: 6–0 v Crewe Alexandra, 21 August 2018
- Biggest defeat: 0–4 v Carlisle United, 15 December 2018
Home colours	Away colours	Third colours

The 2018–19 season was Colchester United's 82nd season in their history and their third successive season competing in League Two. Along with competing in League Two, the club also participated in the FA Cup, EFL Cup and EFL Trophy.

Colchester missed the play-offs by just a single point in a dramatic season finale. Having been in and around the automatic promotion positions early season, Colchester found themselves fighting for the play-offs for much of the campaign. However, a drop in form in March going into mid-April saw them drop out of the play-off places and struggled to make a return. A short spell of form at the end of the season left them in contention with a game to spare, but an 87th-minute equaliser for Newport County in their game on the final day of the season meant the U's finished eighth.

In the FA Cup, Colchester were eliminated by League One side Accrington Stanley in the first round, and League Two rivals Cheltenham Town beat the U's following a penalty shoot-out in the first round of the EFL Cup. Colchester finished third in their EFL Trophy group, missing out on progression following defeats by Southampton under-21s and Cambridge United but did record an Essex derby victory against Southend United.

== Season overview ==
=== Preseason ===
Colchester's position in League Two for the 2018–19 season was confirmed on 21 April 2018, when the U's suffered a 2–1 defeat at Lincoln City, mathematically ruling out potential for promotion through the play-offs.

On 8 May, following the conclusion of the 2017–18 season, Colchester announced four players would be leaving on 1 July 2018 following the expiry of their contracts. These included Doug Loft whose time with the U's had been plagued by injury, Scottish duo Denny Johnstone and Craig Slater who had both been on loan north of the border during the previous season, and Tommy O'Sullivan who again had been out on loan with Torquay United during the latter part of last season.

On 9 May, Academy graduate Drey Wright signed a two-year pre-contract agreement with Scottish Premiership side St Johnstone.

On 10 May, Colchester signed Cheltenham Town midfielder Harry Pell on a three-year contract for an undisclosed six-figure sum.

On 12 May, both Tom Lapslie and Brennan Dickenson took up the option of a further year on their contracts to remain with Colchester until summer 2019.

On 15 May, defender Ryan Jackson signed a contract extension with the club until the summer of 2020.

The club announced on 18 May that seven of the under-23 squad would be released at the end of their contracts. This included Tarryn Allarakhia, Charley Edge, Dominic Kurasik, Eli Phipps, Josh Pollard, Callum Sturgess and JJ Wilson.

Three scholars were offered professional contracts to remain with the club on 24 May, with Dean Ager, Callum Jones and Ollie Kensdale all offered terms.

On 24 May, Colchester signed goalkeeper Bailey Vose from Brighton & Hove Albion for an undisclosed fee on a two-year contract.

Following a successful trial towards the end of the 2017–18 season, Noah Chesmain agreed a one-year contract with the club on 25 May after his release by Millwall.

On 30 May, the club confirmed seven under-23s players had agreed contract extensions. These included George Brown, Ryan Clampin, Eoin McKeown, Decarrey Sheriff, Sam Warde, and Diaz Wright, who agreed one-year deals, and Louis Dunne, who signed a two-year deal.

On 1 June, the club announced that the new stadium sponsors would be JobServe and the stadium therefore renamed JobServe Community Stadium after the expiry of Weston Homes' ten-year deal. The same day, it was announced Millwall would be visiting the stadium for a pre-season friendly on 24 July.

Club captain Luke Prosser agreed a new two-year deal with Colchester United on 6 June.

On 7 June, Colchester signed former West Bromwich Albion goalkeeper Ethan Ross on a two-year contract, while Wolverhampton Wanderers forward Aaron Collins joined the club in a season-long loan deal.

On 8 June, Frank Nouble signed a two-year contract with the U's joining from League Two rivals Newport County after his contract had expired. Meanwhile, three more friendlies were confirmed, with trips to nearby Maldon & Tiptree and newly promoted National League side Braintree Town on 7 and 10 July respectively. Also announced was a trip to north Wales to play Colwyn Bay on 13 July.

On 12 June, a further friendly fixture was added with a trip to Dagenham & Redbridge set for 17 July.

On 15 June, Colchester were drawn away to Cheltenham Town in the EFL Cup first round.

On 22 June, Colchester announced another friendly game against Dartford on 21 July.

On 27 June, Colchester signed Swindon Town striker Luke Norris on a three-year deal for an undisclosed fee.

On 29 June, manager John McGreal announced that both Sean Murray and Sam Walker had left the club after failing to agree new contracts, while he also hoped out-of-contract Kane Vincent-Young would remain with the club.

On 5 July, Colchester signed centre back Chris Forino-Joseph on a one-year contract following a trial period with the under-23 side last season.

Colchester played their first pre-season friendly against Maldon & Tiptree on 7 July. The visitors in their new away kit took the lead through captain Luke Prosser when he headed in Aaron Collins' corner kick after 12-minutes. Three minutes later, Collins was again the provider for Sammie Szmodics to convert from close range. Collins was then fouled in the penalty area and stepped up to convert from the spot on 27-minutes. On the half-hour mark, Sam Warde, playing for the Jammers, scored for the home side with a 25-yard free kick. After the break, both sides made wholesale changes, and Mikael Mandron completed the scoring to make it 4–1 to United on the hour mark.

A final pre-season game against League One Gillingham was arranged on 10 July for Saturday 28 July.

Colchester travelled to Braintree Town for their second pre-season friendly. The U's took the lead after ten minutes when Frank Nouble registered his first goal for the club following a lay-off from Ryan Gondoh. In the second half the lead was doubled when Mikael Mandron struck on 51-minutes, before Sammie Szmodics scored four minutes later to make it 3–0. Junior Ogedi-Uzokwe scored from close range in the 71st minute and Mandron scored his third goal in two games to complete the scoring three minutes from time.

During their summer training camp in Cheshire, the U's faced Northern Premier League side Colwyn Bay. Two goals from Mikael Mandron and one each from Tom Lapslie, Aaron Collins and Frank Nouble secured an easy victory for Colchester.

Following the announcement that JobServe had gained the stadium naming rights, JobServe owner and club chairman Robbie Cowling announced JobServe would also be the club's shirt sponsor for home and away kits for the 2018–19 season.

On 13 July, Colchester were drawn against Southend United and Cambridge United for the EFL Trophy group stage, with their final Category One under-21 invited opponents revealed on 18 July.

Dagenham & Redbridge held the U's to a 1–1 draw at Victoria Road on 17 July. Michael Cheek opened the scoring with a free kick at the midway point of the first half, but Diaz Wright scored five minutes from full-time to rescue a draw for the visitors.

Colchester's final opponents in the EFL Trophy group stage were drawn on 18 July with Southampton under-21s set to visit the Community Stadium.

A late own goal proved the difference between hosts Dartford and the U's on 21 July. Ronnie Vint put the ball into his own net following a cross from Brennan Dickenson after 81-minutes as Colchester battled to a narrow victory over the National League South side.

In their penultimate friendly fixture and their first of two home friendly games, Colchester defeated Millwall 2–1 thanks to first-half goals from Sammie Szmodics and Kane Vincent-Young, still to sign a new contract with the U's. Millwall earned a late consolation goal through Jed Wallace in the 89th minute to deny United a clean sheet.

On 25 July, under-23s centre-back Will Wright signed for National League side Dagenham & Redbridge on loan until January.

On 27 July, Junior Ogedi-Uzokwe joined National League side Bromley on loan until January.

Colchester closed their pre-season campaign with a resounding 5–1 win over Gillingham at the Community Stadium. Sammie Szmodics opened the scoring inside five minutes. Szmodics then provided the assist for Aaron Collins to make it 2–0 after quarter of an hour, before Mikael Mandron made it 3–0 on 30-minutes. On 39-minutes, Gillingham's Mark Byrne received a red card for a challenge on Tom Lapslie. The visitors pulled a goal back just before the interval through Dean Parrett. Mandron restored the U's three goal advantage on 57-minutes, and Tom Eastman rounded off an unbeaten pre-season with Colchester's fifth goal on 62-minutes.

=== August ===
Colchester United's League Two campaign started with an away game at Notts County on 4 August. John McGreal handed debuts to Harry Pell, Aaron Collins and Frank Nouble. Dillon Barnes was selected in goal for the U's and claimed a clean sheet for himself as the match ended 0–0, with both teams having good opportunities to take all three points.

After much speculation about his future, Kane Vincent-Young signed a new two-year contract with the club on 6 August.

On 7 August, the U's signed Dagenham & Redbridge academy player David Agboola to bolster the under-23 squad. He signed a one-year contract with the club.

Colchester faced Port Vale in their first home fixture of the season. Courtney Senior and Ryan Jackson scored in the eighth and 23rd-minutes respectively to hand the home side a 2–0 win on 11 August.

Colchester were once again eliminated from the EFL Cup at the first round stage. Hosts Cheltenham took the lead within the first minute through Ryan Broom following a defensive error by Frankie Kent. In the second half, Dillon Barnes conceded a penalty after a foul on Jacob Maddox. Conor Thomas stepped up to convert the kick and give Cheltenham a 2–0 lead. Substitute Sammie Szmodics registered his first goal of the season 12-minutes after arriving on the pitch in the 79th minute, before debutant Luke Norris scored to level the match at 2–2. The game ended in a draw, with a penalty shoot-out ensuing. Cheltenham won the shoot-out 6–5 after Courtney Senior missed the decisive kick in sudden death.

On 18 August, Colchester scored a 95th-minute equaliser in their game at Mansfield Town. Following a goalless first half, the hosts took an 81st-minute lead through Craig Davies, but Sammie Szmodics goal drew the U's level in the fifth minute of added time to secure a 1–1 draw.

On 21 August, Noah Chesmain signed for Southern League Premier Division Central side Hitchin Town in an initial month-long loan deal.

The U's hosted Crewe Alexandra in their first midweek fixture of the season on 21 August. Frankie Kent scored his first goal of the campaign after four minutes, before Brennan Dickenson scored his first goal since April 2017 to double Colchester's advantage just four minutes later. Dickenson then grabbed another goal on 26-minutes to give the hosts a 3–0 lead going in to half-time. After the break, Ryan Jackson scored his second goal of the campaign just before the hour mark, before substitute Luke Norris scored his first league goal for Colchester on 74-minutes. Tom Lapslie added another goal on 77-minutes to earn a comprehensive 6–0 victory for the U's.

Colchester suffered their first defeat of the season at home to Northampton Town on 25 August. A second-half goal from Matt Crooks was added to in injury time by Billy Waters but the U's earned themselves a late consolation goal after Aaron Pierre scored an own goal.

On 30 August, Tariq Issa signed for Southern League Premier Division Central side Needham Market on loan until January.

On 31 August, Cameron James joined National League side Braintree Town on loan until January.

=== September ===
On 1 September, Colchester won 3–1 in their second trip to Whaddon Road in less than a month following the 2–2 EFL Cup penalty defeat to Cheltenham. Luke Norris scored from the penalty spot on 12 minutes after Frankie Kent was fouled in the penalty area, and then added a second from a free kick after 26 minutes. After the break, Cheltenham pulled a goal back through Kevin Dawson, but Colchester secured victory in the 88th minute, again from the penalty spot, as Harry Pell converted against his former club.

Colchester faced Southampton Under-21s on 4 September in an EFL Trophy clash. John McGreal handed debuts to defensive pair Aaron Barnes and Paul Rooney. The U's fell behind in the 26th minute to a Marcus Barnes goal. After the break, Ryan Clampin was introduced for his Colchester debut. Southampton added a second goal in the fourth minute of added time in front of a Community Stadium attendance of just 532.

Harry Pell scored in his second consecutive league games against Tranmere Rovers on 8 September. James Norwood had given the hosts the lead just before half time but Pell's strike on the hour mark earned Colchester a point from the 1–1 draw.

On 28 September, Paul Rooney joined Bromley on loan for one month, while Sam Warde joined Leiston in a month-long loan deal.

Colchester welcomed former manager Joe Dunne back to the Community Stadium for the first time as an opposing manager when the U's hosted Cambridge United on 15 September. Sammie Szmodics scored his third goal of the season to open the scoring on 23 minutes. Twelve minutes later Frank Nouble registered his first Colchester goal to give the home side a 2–0 advantage going into the break. In the second half, substitute Courtney Senior scored his second goal of the season to earn a comfortable win for the U's and lift them to fourth in the table.

Colchester surrendered a two-goal lead to draw 3–3 at Oldham Athletic on 22 September. Luke Norris opened the scoring after 15 minutes, and Harry Pell scored to make it 2–0 on 50 minutes. Sam Surridge pulled a goal back for the hosts on 59 minutes, before Norris scored his sixth goal of the season to hand the U's a 3–1 lead. Surridge then scored again with five minutes remaining to reduce the deficit, but not before Peter Clarke scored an 88th-minute equaliser.

Colchester hosted Bury in their final game of the month on 29 September. The U's lost Frankie Kent to injury after just nine minutes of play, and his replacement Tom Eastman was also withdrawn following an injury at half time. This came after Bury opened the scoring through Byron Moore after 35 minutes. Bury then doubled their lead on 52 minutes through Chris Dagnall. Luke Norris converted from the penalty spot on 81 minutes to give the U's a glimmer of hope of earning some points but they eventually fell to a 2–1 defeat.

=== October ===
On 2 October, the U's bounced back from their home defeat by Bury to win 3–1 against Yeovil Town. Tom Eastman scored his first goal of the season to give Colchester a 25th-minute lead. After the interval, Frank Nouble scored his second Colchester goal on 59 minutes, before adding a second on 84 minutes. Yeovil pulled a goal back in the fifth minute of added time through Tom James.

Colchester suffered their first away defeat of the season on 6 October. Sammie Szmodics had opened the scoring against Stevenage after just two minutes, but former U's man Kurtis Guthrie levelled the score on 41 minutes. Ben Kennedy converted from the penalty spot after Brennan Dickenson fouled Steve Seddon in the penalty area eight minutes from time. Emmanuel Sonupe then added a third for Stevenage two minutes later to drop Colchester out of the play-off zone.

Colchester took on Southend United for an Essex derby clash in the EFL Trophy at the Community Stadium on 9 October. Frankie Kent scored after 39 minutes and on 49 minutes Aaron Collins scored his first goal in a U's shirt for a 2–0 victory.

Colchester returned to winning ways in the league with a 3–1 victory over Crawley Town on 13 October. Sammie Szmodics opened the scoring after 27 minutes for the home side. Crawley equalised after Luke Prosser was judged to have fouled Luke Gambin in the penalty area and Filipe Morais converted the spot kick. After the break, Frank Nouble restored the U's lead on 57 minutes, and Luke Norris scored his eighth goal of the season in the final minute of normal time. Crawley had a man sent off when Bondz N'Gala kicked out at Norris.

On 20 October, Colchester won 1–0 at Morecambe with Courtney Senior's third goal of the season separating the two sides. They were then defeated 1–0 on the road at Grimsby Town on 23 October with Wes Thomas' second-half goal winning it for the home side. This followed the FA Cup first round draw, at which Colchester were drawn away to League One Accrington Stanley.

On 26 October, young goalkeeper Bailey Vose joined National League South side Dartford in an initial month-long loan deal.

Colchester hosted league leaders Lincoln City on 27 October. Frankie Kent's third goal of the season in the 28th minute was enough to consign Lincoln to only their third defeat of the season and reduce the gap to five points between the two sides in the table.

=== November ===
Colchester moved into the promotion places with a 1–0 home win over Swindon Town on 3 November. Shortly after top scorer Luke Norris had been stretchered off with an injury against his former club, Sammie Szmodics scored his sixth goal of the season. The U's held on in the second half to gain all three points.

On 10 November, the U's played their FA Cup first round tie against Accrington Stanley. After only three minutes, Colchester lost defender Tom Eastman to injury, and then goalkeeper Rene Gilmartin suffered a similar fate after half an hour. Shortly after Dillon Barnes was brought on to replace Gilmartin, Accrington scored through Daniel Barlaser. The hosts held on to record a 1–0 victory, spelling a first round exit for the U's for a third successive season.

The U's played their second cup game in three days in their final group stage EFL Trophy match at Cambridge United. Colchester-born Ollie Kensdale made his senior debut in defence, but United were first to concede to an Ade Azeez goal after 32 minutes. On the stroke of half-time, Dillon Barnes saved a penalty from Azeez, and saved the follow-up effort, but later conceded to Azeez again nine-minutes from full-time. In second-half injury time, Harry Pell scored his fourth goal of the campaign to give the U's hope, but Emmanuel Osadebe struck a third for Cambridge less than a minute later to dump Colchester out of the competition.

Colchester suffered their third consecutive defeat on 17 November as they were beaten 2–0 at Newport County. They slipped out of the automatic promotion places as a result. They made a return to the promotion spots following a 1–1 home draw with Exeter City on 24 November. Jayden Stockley cancelled out Sammie Szmodics' 67th-minute strike, bundling the ball into the net on 70 minutes to rescue a point for the away side.

Szmodics scored in a second successive game to level with Luke Norris on eight goals as the club's top goalscorer. His deflected effort was enough to see off Forest Green Rovers at The New Lawn on 27 November to keep Colchester third in the table.

After Paul Rooney's loan spell at Bromley ended, he made another loan move to Billericay Town on 30 November.

=== December ===
Mikael Mandron registered his first goal of the season on 8 December as Colchester beat Sol Campbell's Macclesfield Town 1–0 in his first game in charge of the club.

Eoin McKeown joined National League South side Wealdstone in an emergency loan deal.

Colchester suffered a 4–0 defeat at Carlisle United on 15 December. Three second-half goals put the match beyond the U's in their heaviest defeat of the season.

On 21 December, Cameron James returned to Braintree Town on loan until 16 January.

Captain Luke Prosser scored the only goal of the game as second-placed Milton Keynes Dons hosted the third placed U's at Stadium MK, earning Colchester a first-ever win at the stadium and inflicting a first home defeat of the season on the Dons.

On Christmas Eve, Ollie Kensdale signed his first professional contract, signing on until summer 2021.

Colchester dropped out of the play-off places on Boxing Day following a home defeat by Stevenage. The U's fell behind after five minutes when Joel Byrom's free kick hit the post and went in off Rene Gilmartin. They then found themselves two goals down on 36-minutes following a Danny Newton tap-in. Luke Prosser scored his second goal in as many games to reduce the deficit in a dominant second-half but Colchester were eventually consigned to a 2–1 loss.

In their final game of 2018, Colchester were held to a dull 0–0 draw by Morecambe.

=== January ===
Colchester started the new year in terrible fashion with a 2–0 defeat at Crawley Town on New Year's Day. The hosts had to play for almost an hour with ten men after Joe McNerney was sent off. On the hour mark, Crawley took the lead through Luke Gambin against the run of play. Colchester were also reduced to ten men in the 89th minute when Frankie Kent was sent off for a second bookable offence, allowing Gambin to score again with the resulting free kick. With the result, they fell out of the play-off places and the top seven for the first time since early October.

On 2 January, Aaron Collins' loan from Wolverhampton Wanderers was terminated by mutual consent after four starts and a total of ten appearances for the U's.

On 3 January, Tom Lapslie agreed a 2 1/2-year contract extension, committing himself to the club until summer 2021.

On 4 January, young goalkeeper Ethan Ross joined Maidstone United in an initial one-month loan deal.

In their first home game of 2019, Colchester hosted bottom-of-the-table Notts County and were held to a 3–3 draw. Colchester struck first through Sammie Szmodics who scored his ninth goal of the season. They were pegged back on 16 minutes when Jon Stead scored, and three minutes later the visitors were in front following a Daniel Jones goal. County went further ahead on 32 minutes through Kristian Dennis before an attempted clearance deflected into the net from Mikael Mandron to bring the U's back into the game at 3–2. In the second-half, Courtney Senior was fouled in the penalty area and Harry Pell stepped up to convert.

On 8 January, Ryan Clampin signed a new contract to keep him with the club until summer 2021. Meanwhile, Will Wright's loan at Dagenham & Redbridge was extended until the end of the season, and Decarrey Sheriff joined National League South side Dulwich Hamlet on loan for a month having completed his loan spell at Maldon & Tiptree.

After going four games without a win, Colchester picked up a 3–0 victory at Port Vale on 12 January. Courtney Senior put the visitors ahead after five minutes, and the U's were 2–0 ahead when Harry Pell scored on 18 minutes. He then scored his third in two games on 69 minutes to move the U's back into the play-off places and fourth in the table.

On 19 January, Colchester took a 2–0 lead by the 30th-minute against high-flying Mansfield Town through Tom Eastman and Courtney Senior goals. After the break, Mansfield scored three goals to win the match 3–2. The U's then lost again from a winning position away to Crewe on 26 January. Sammie Szmodics had scored an eleventh-minute goal for his tenth of the season, but Crewe equalised shortly after half-time and then scored a late winner to drop Colchester out of the play-off places once again.

On 29 January, Colchester signed Shrewsbury Town winger Abo Eisa on loan for the remainder of the season. The following day, the club announced the re-signing of Ben Stevenson on a 2 1/2-year deal from Wolverhampton Wanderers. Stevenson had appeared for the U's on loan during the 2017–18 season after signing for Wolves during the January 2018 transfer window. On 31 January, transfer deadline day, the U's brought in Newcastle United winger Callum Roberts on loan until the end of the season.

=== February ===
On 1 February, Colchester announced the signings of two triallists who had been involved with the under-23 squad. Midfielders Tyrique Hyde and Percy Kiangebeni each signed deals until June 2020.

Colchester bounced back from two successive defeats to convincingly beat Northampton Town 4–0 at Sixfields Stadium on 2 February. Frank Nouble scored his fifth goal of the season to open the scoring on 25-minutes. The score remained the same until the interval, and half-time substitute and debutant Abo Eisa doubled the U's advantage five minutes after coming on. Kane Vincent-Young made it 3–0 after 53-minutes, before Sammie Szmodics completed the scoring on 67-minutes with his tenth league goal of the campaign.

Striker Junior Ogedi-Uzokwe was once again loaned out on 6 February, joining League of Ireland Premier Division side Derry City until 30 June.

The U's moved back into the play-offs and up to fourth in the table with a comfortable 3–0 win over Cheltenham Town at the Community Stadium on 9 February. Each goalscorer had scored in the 4–0 win at Northampton last weekend as Kane Vincent-Young opened the scoring on 30-minutes before Frank Nouble doubled the lead two minutes from the break. In the second-half, Abo Eisa scored his second goal in his second game for the club to secure victory.

Macclesfield Town hosted the U's on 16 February and took the lead in the 44th-minute Scott Wilson. Colchester equalised after the break when Frank Nouble converted a penalty after Courtney Senior had been fouled in the penalty area. Neither side could score a winner and drew 1–1.

On 22 February, midfielder Sam Warde joined League of Ireland Premier Division side Sligo Rovers on loan until the end of June.

Colchester hosted fellow play-off hopefuls Carlisle United on 23 February hoping to make up for their 4–0 defeat at Brunton Park in December. After a goalless first-half, the visitors took the lead on 57-minutes through Hallam Hope, but Colchester pressed for an equaliser and scored in the 84th-minute through Frankie Kent to draw 1–1 and record an undefeated February.

=== March ===
On 2 March, Colchester suffered their first defeat since 26 January when they were beaten 3–0 at Swindon Town.

On 9 March, Colchester returned to the play-off positions with a 3–0 home win over Newport County. Sammie Szmodics scored his twelfth goal of the season on 20-minutes, and Courtney Senior doubled the U's lead in first-half stoppage time. Frank Nouble then scored the game's third goal against his former club. Meanwhile, Noah Chilvers came off the bench in the 89th-minute of the match to make his professional bow.

On 12 March, Colchester were beaten 3–0 at home by Forest Green Rovers. Frank Nouble was sent off for a second bookable offence in the second-half, leaving the U's in seventh in the League Two table.

Callum Roberts' loan spell with the club was cut short on 13 March after being recalled by Newcastle United.

On 16 March, Colchester suffered a second successive 3–0 defeat at Exeter City. The result dropped them out of the play-off places, but the match did see the debut of Colchester's youngest-ever first-team player when 16-year-old Todd Miller replaced Courtney Senior in the 87th-minute of the game.

Colchester lost their third consecutive league game on 23 March with a 2–0 home defeat by Tranmere Rovers. The result dropped the U's to ninth place in the table and four points off the play-off positions.

Following the news that Harry Pell had been ruled out for the remainder of the season with his hamstring injury, Colchester signed Sam Saunders on a short-term contract until the end of the season having previously played in League One for Wycombe Wanderers until his January release.

On 30 March, Kane Vincent-Young scored a 96th-minute winner at Cambridge United to seal a first victory in three weeks for the U's and return them to the play-off hunt with the club finding themselves in eighth position, just one point shy of the play-off places.

=== April ===
Colchester were beaten 2–0 at home by Oldham Athletic on 6 April, dropping them to ninth position and two points outside of the play-off positions. They then lost 2–0 at Bury on 13 April, falling further behind in the play-off race with the U's now five points adrift of seventh-placed Exeter.

The U's closed the gap to seventh-placed Exeter to just two points on 19 April with a 1–0 home victory over Grimsby, Frank Nouble scoring Colchester's only goal of the game.

Colchester were held to a draw by relegation-threatened Yeovil Town on 22 April. The hosts took the lead in the 53rd-minute, but Colchester goalkeeper Dillon Barnes was sent off for violent conduct two minutes later, allowing substitute goalkeeper Ethan Ross to come on for his professional debut. He kept a clean sheet for his 40-minute cameo. Tom Eastman scored the U's equaliser on 75-minutes to move up to eighth but remained two-points behind seventh-placed Exeter with two matches to play.

On 27 April, Colchester won their final home game of the season 2–0 against automatic promotion-chasing Milton Keynes Dons. Sammie Szmodics scored his 13th goal of the season after just two minutes of play, and Frankie Kent doubled the lead two minutes into the second-half. The match saw the full debut of Ethan Ross in the U's goal in the absence of suspended Dillon Barnes and the injured Rene Gilmartin. Colchester were still two points shy of seventh-placed Exeter with one game remaining.

On 29 April, Frankie Kent was named as Colchester United Player of the Year at the club's annual awards ceremony.

=== May ===
Knowing only a win would stand the club any chances of reaching the play-offs, the U's travelled to Champions Lincoln City on 4 May and comfortably won 3–0 with three first-half goals. Brennan Dickenson opened the scoring on 22 minutes, then Sammie Szmodics scored his 14th and 15th goals of the season in the 27th and 44th-minutes respectively. However, their attempts were in vain when Newport County equalised at Morecambe in the 87th-minute of their match to pip the U's to seventh place by a single point, spelling a fourth successive season in League Two for Colchester.

== Players ==
As of 30 March 2019

No.	Name	Position	Nat.	Place of birth	Date of birth	Apps	Goals	Signed from	Date signed	Fee
Goalkeepers
1	Dillon Barnes	GK	(England)	Enfield Town	8 April 1996 (aged 22)	4	0	(England) Bedford Town	1 September 2015	Free transfer
25	Rene Gilmartin	GK	(Republic of Ireland)	Dublin	31 May 1987 (aged 31)	2	0	(England) Watford	7 July 2017	Free transfer
29	Ethan Ross	GK	(England)	Enfield Town	6 March 1997 (aged 21)	0	0	(England) West Bromwich Albion	7 June 2018	Free transfer
32	Bailey Vose	GK	(England)	Sidcup	11 May 1998 (aged 20)	0	0	(England) Brighton & Hove Albion	24 May 2018	Undisclosed
Defenders
2	Ryan Jackson	RB	(England)	Streatham	31 July 1990 (aged 27)	45	2	(England) Gillingham	1 July 2017	Free transfer
5	Luke Prosser (c)	CB	(England)	Enfield Town	28 May 1988 (aged 30)	33	1	(England) Southend United	22 June 2015	Free transfer
6	Frankie Kent	CB	(England)	Havering	21 November 1995 (aged 22)	97	3	Academy	1 August 2013	Free transfer
11	Brennan Dickenson	LWB/LW/FW	(England)	Ferndown	26 February 1993 (aged 25)	46	12	(England) Gillingham	29 June 2016	Free transfer
12	Aaron Barnes	FB	(England)	Croydon	14 October 1996 (aged 21)	0	0	(England) Charlton Athletic	31 January 2018	Undisclosed
17	Cameron James	CB/FB/DM	(England)	Chelmsford	11 February 1998 (aged 20)	27	0	Academy	15 July 2015	Free transfer
18	Tom Eastman	CB	(England)	Colchester	21 October 1991 (aged 26)	280	14	(England) Ipswich Town	19 May 2011	Free transfer
21	Noah Chesmain	DF	(England)	Waltham Forest	16 December 1997 (aged 20)	0	0	(England) Millwall	25 May 2018	Free transfer
22	Kane Vincent-Young	LB/RB	(England)	Camden	15 March 1996 (aged 22)	80	1	Academy	23 September 2014	Free transfer
26	Paul Rooney	DF	(Republic of Ireland)	Dublin	22 March 1997 (aged 21)	0	0	(England) Millwall	24 January 2018	Undisclosed
30	Will Wright	CB/RB	(England)		12 June 1997 (aged 20)	0	0	(England) Hitchin Town	18 August 2017	Undisclosed
35	Ollie Kensdale	CB/CM	(England)	Colchester	20 April 2000 (aged 18)	0	0	Academy	12 July 2016	Free transfer
46	Chris Forino-Joseph	CB	(England)	Islington	2000	0	0	(England) Cheshunt	5 July 2018	Free transfer
Midfielders
4	Tom Lapslie	CM	(England)	Waltham Forest	5 October 1995 (aged 22)	95	3	Academy	25 April 2013	Free transfer
8	Harry Pell	MF	(England)	Tilbury	21 October 1991 (aged 26)	0	0	(England) Cheltenham Town	10 May 2018	Undisclosed
10	Sammie Szmodics	AM	(England)	Colchester	24 September 1995 (aged 22)	114	23	Academy	1 July 2013	Free transfer
14	Brandon Comley	MF	(Montserrat)	(England) Islington	18 November 1995 (aged 22)	40	1	(England) QPR	17 January 2018	Undisclosed
16	Diaz Wright	MF	(England)	Greenwich	22 February 1998 (aged 20)	2	0	Academy	30 June 2016	Free transfer
24	Ben Stevenson	MF	(England)	Leicester	23 March 1997 (aged 21)	13	2	(England) Wolverhampton Wanderers	30 January 2019	Undisclosed
27	Noah Chilvers	AM	(England)	Chelmsford	22 February 2001 (aged 17)	0	0	Academy	3 July 2017	Free transfer
33	Louis Dunne	MF	(Republic of Ireland)	(England) Colchester	7 September 1998 (aged 19)	5	0	Academy	1 July 2015	Free transfer
36	Sam Saunders	MF	(England)	Erith	29 August 1983 (aged 34)	0	0	(England) Wycombe Wanderers	30 March 2019	Free transfer
38	Arjanit Krasniqi	MF	(England)	Westminster	1999	0	0	(England) Waltham Forest	31 January 2018	Undisclosed
40	Dean Ager	AM	(England)	Chelmsford	1999	0	0	Academy	12 July 2016	Free transfer
43	Sam Warde	MF	(Republic of Ireland)	Limerick	13 March 1998 (aged 20)	0	0	(England) Huddersfield Town	20 July 2017	Free transfer
Forwards
7	Courtney Senior	WG	(England)	Croydon	30 June 1997 (aged 20)	19	4	(England) Brentford	28 June 2016	Free transfer
9	Luke Norris	CF	(England)	Stevenage	3 June 1993 (aged 24)	0	0	(England) Swindon Town	27 June 2018	Undisclosed
19	Mikael Mandron	CF	(France)	Boulogne-sur-Mer	11 October 1994 (aged 23)	49	10	(England) Wigan Athletic	21 July 2017	Undisclosed
20	Junior Ogedi-Uzokwe	FW	(Nigeria)		20 March 1994 (aged 24)	9	1	(England) Maldon & Tiptree	3 January 2018	Undisclosed
23	Ryan Gondoh	LW	(England)	Sutton	6 June 1997 (aged 20)	2	0	(England) Maldon & Tiptree	3 January 2018	Undisclosed
28	Ollie Sims	WG	(England)	Bury St Edmunds	29 March 2001 (aged 17)	0	0	Academy	3 July 2017	Free transfer
31	Tariq Issa	FW	(England)		2 September 1997 (aged 20)	4	0	Academy	15 July 2015	Free transfer
34	Decarrey Sheriff	FW	(England)	Southwark	18 February 1998 (aged 20)	0	0	Academy	30 June 2016	Free transfer
37	George Brown	WG	(England)	Romford	3 March 1998 (aged 20)	0	0	Academy	30 June 2016	Free transfer
41	Callum Jones	CF	(England)	Colchester	1999	0	0	Academy	12 July 2016	Free transfer
42	Eoin McKeown	CF	(England)	Westminster	5 November 1998 (aged 19)	1	1	Academy	25 May 2017	Free transfer
44	Ryan Clampin	LW	(England)	Colchester	29 January 1999 (aged 19)	0	0	Academy		Free transfer
45	Frank Nouble	CF	(England)	Lewisham	24 September 1991 (aged 26)	0	0	(Wales) Newport County	8 June 2018	Free transfer
47	Todd Miller	WG	(England)		1 October 2002 (aged 15)	0	0	Academy		Free transfer

== Transfers and contracts ==
=== In ===
Date	Position	Nationality	Name	From	Fee	Ref.
10 May 2018	MF	(England)	Harry Pell	(England) Cheltenham Town	Undisclosed	
24 May 2018	GK	(England)	Bailey Vose	(England) Brighton & Hove Albion	Undisclosed	
25 May 2018	DF	(England)	Noah Chesmain	(England) Millwall	Free transfer	(Note: Officially joined the club on 1 July 2018)
7 June 2018	GK	(England)	Ethan Ross	(England) West Bromwich Albion	Free transfer	
8 June 2018	CF	(England)	Frank Nouble	(Wales) Newport County	Free transfer	
27 June 2018	CF	(England)	Luke Norris	(England) Swindon Town	Undisclosed	
5 July 2018	CB	(England)	Chris Forino-Joseph	(England) Cheshunt	Free transfer	
7 August 2018	DF	(England)	David Agboola	(England) Dagenham & Redbridge	Undisclosed	
30 January 2019	MF	(England)	Ben Stevenson	(England) Wolverhampton Wanderers	Undisclosed	
1 February 2019	MF	(England)	Tyrique Hyde	(England) Dagenham & Redbridge	Free transfer	
1 February 2019	MF	(England)	Percy Kiangebeni	(England) St Albans City	Free transfer	
30 March 2019	MF	(England)	Sam Saunders	(England) Wycombe Wanderers	Free transfer	

=== Out ===
Date	Position	Nationality	Name	To	Fee	Ref.
9 May 2018	WG	(England)	Drey Wright	(Scotland) St Johnstone	Free transfer	(Note: Officially left the club on 1 July 2018)
14 June 2018	LB	(England)	JJ Wilson	(England) Needham Market (Note: Following JJ Wilson's release by Colchester United, he signed a pre-contract agreement with Needham Market.)	Released	
26 June 2018	CF	(Scotland)	Denny Johnstone	(Scotland) Greenock Morton (Note: Following Denny Johnstone's release by Colchester United, he signed a pre-contract agreement with Greenock Morton.)	Released	
1 July 2018	GK	(Australia)	Dominic Kurasik	(England) Kidsgrove Athletic (Note: Following Dominic Kurasik's release by Colchester United, he later joined Kidsgrove Athletic.)	Released	
1 July 2018	CB	(England)	Josh Pollard	(England) Coggeshall Town (Note: Following Josh Pollard's release by Colchester United, he later joined Coggeshall Town.)	Released	
1 July 2018	LB	(England)	Callum Sturgess	(England) Needham Market (Note: Following Callum Sturgess' release by Colchester United, he later joined Needham Market.)	Released	
1 July 2018	MF	(England)	Doug Loft	(England) Shrewsbury Town (Note: Following Doug Loft's release by Colchester United, he later joined Shrewsbury Town.)	Released	
1 July 2018	CM	(Wales)	Tommy O'Sullivan	(England) Hereford (Note: Following Tommy O'Sullivan's release by Colchester United, he later joined Hereford.)	Released	
1 July 2018	CM	(Scotland)	Craig Slater	(Scotland) Partick Thistle (Note: Following Craig Slater's release by Colchester United, he later joined Partick Thistle.)	Released	
1 July 2018	WG	(England)	Tarryn Allarakhia	(England) Crawley Town (Note: Following Tarryn Allarakhia's release by Colchester United, he later joined Crawley Town.)	Released	
1 July 2018	WG	(Wales)	Charley Edge	(England) Hednesford Town (Note: Following Charley Edge's release by Colchester United, he later joined Hednesford Town.)	Released	
1 July 2018	FW	(Wales)	Eli Phipps	(England) Weston-super-Mare (Note: Following Eli Phipps' release by Colchester United, he later joined Weston-super-Mare.)	Released	
25 July 2018	GK	(England)	Sam Walker	(England) Reading	Free transfer	
26 July 2018	AM	(Republic of Ireland)	Sean Murray	(Denmark) Vejle Boldklub	Free transfer	

=== Loans in ===
Date	Position	Nationality	Name	From	End date	Ref.
7 June 2018	CF	(Wales)	Aaron Collins	(England) Wolverhampton Wanderers	2 January 2019	(Note: Officially joined the club on loan on 1 July 2018)
29 January 2019	WG	(Sudan)	Abo Eisa	(England) Shrewsbury Town	End of season	
31 January 2019	WG	(England)	Callum Roberts	(England) Newcastle United	End of season	

=== Loans out ===
Date	Position	Nationality	Name	To	End date	Ref.
25 July 2018	CB/RB	(England)	Will Wright	(England) Dagenham & Redbridge	End of season	
27 July 2018	CF	(Nigeria)	Junior Ogedi-Uzokwe	(England) Bromley	7 January 2019	
August 2018	CM	(England)	Callum Anderson	(England) Maldon & Tiptree	March 2019	
August 2018	CB/CM	(England)	Ollie Kensdale	(England) Maldon & Tiptree	November 2018	
August 2018	FW	(England)	Decarrey Sheriff	(England) Maldon & Tiptree	5 January 2019	
21 August 2018	DF	(England)	Noah Chesmain	(England) Hitchin Town	March 2019	
30 August 2018	FW	(England)	Tariq Issa	(England) Needham Market	5 January 2019	
31 August 2018	CB/FB/DM	(England)	Cameron James	(England) Braintree Town	12 November 2018	
3 September 2018	WG	(England)	George Brown	(England) Margate	End of season	
28 September 2018	DF	(Republic of Ireland)	Paul Rooney	(England) Bromley	November 2018	
28 September 2018	MF	(Republic of Ireland)	Sam Warde	(England) Leiston	27 October 2018	
26 October 2018	GK	(England)	Bailey Vose	(England) Dartford	25 April 2019	
30 November 2018	DF	(Republic of Ireland)	Paul Rooney	(England) Billericay Town	End of season	
21 December 2018	CB/FB/DM	(England)	Cameron James	(England) Braintree Town	10 February 2019	
13 December 2018	CF	(England)	Eoin McKeown	(England) Wealdstone	March 2019	
4 January 2019	GK	(England)	Ethan Ross	(England) Maidstone United	February 2019	
8 January 2019	FW	(England)	Decarrey Sheriff	(England) Dulwich Hamlet	March 2019	
6 February 2019	CF	(Nigeria)	Junior Ogedi-Uzokwe	(Northern Ireland) Derry City	30 June 2019	
22 February 2019	CM	(Republic of Ireland)	Sam Warde	(Republic of Ireland) Sligo Rovers	June 2019	
16 March 2019	LW	(England)	Ryan Gondoh	(England) FC Halifax Town	End of season	
28 March 2019	DF	(England)	Noah Chesmain	(England) Hungerford Town	End of season	
28 March 2019	FW	(England)	Decarrey Sheriff	(England) Needham Market	End of season	

=== Contracts ===
New contracts and contract extensions.

Date	Position	Nationality	Name	Length	Expiry	Ref.
10 May 2018	MF	(England)	Harry Pell	3 years	June 2021	
12 May 2018	LWB/LB/LW	(England)	Brennan Dickenson	1 year	June 2019	
12 May 2018	CM	(England)	Tom Lapslie	1 year	June 2019	
15 May 2018	RB	(England)	Ryan Jackson	2 years	June 2020	
24 May 2018	GK	(England)	Bailey Vose	2 years	June 2020	
25 May 2018	DF	(England)	Noah Chesmain	1 year	June 2019	
30 May 2018	MF	(Republic of Ireland)	Louis Dunne	2 years	June 2020	
30 May 2018	MF	(Republic of Ireland)	Sam Warde	1 year	June 2019	
30 May 2018	MF	(England)	Diaz Wright	1 year	June 2019	
30 May 2018	WG	(England)	George Brown	1 year	June 2019	
30 May 2018	LW	(England)	Ryan Clampin	1 year	June 2019	
30 May 2018	CF	(England)	Eoin McKeown	1 year	June 2019	
30 May 2018	FW	(England)	Decarrey Sheriff	1 year	June 2019	
6 June 2018	CB	(England)	Luke Prosser	2 years	June 2020	
7 June 2018	GK	(England)	Ethan Ross	2 years	June 2020	
8 June 2018	CF	(England)	Frank Nouble	2 years	June 2020	
27 June 2018	CF	(England)	Luke Norris	3 years	June 2021	
5 July 2018	CB	(England)	Chris Forino-Joseph	1 year	June 2019	
6 August 2018	LB/RB	(England)	Kane Vincent-Young	2 years	June 2020	
24 December 2018	CB/CM	(England)	Ollie Kensdale	2 1/2 years	June 2021	
3 January 2019	CM	(England)	Tom Lapslie	2 1/2 years	June 2021	
8 January 2019	LW	(England)	Ryan Clampin	2 1/2 years	June 2021	
30 January 2019	MF	(England)	Ben Stevenson	2 1/2 years	June 2021	
1 February 2019	MF	(England)	Tyrique Hyde	1 1/2 years	June 2020	
1 February 2019	MF	(England)	Percy Kiangebeni	1 1/2 years	June 2020	
30 March 2019	MF	(England)	Sam Saunders	3 months	June 2019	

== Match details ==
=== Preseason friendlies ===
Colchester United announced their first pre-season friendly on 1 June, with Millwall visiting the Community Stadium on 24 July. Away trips against Maldon & Tiptree, Braintree Town, and Colwyn Bay were confirmed on 8 June, and a trip to Dagenham & Redbridge confirmed on 12 June. It was announced on 22 June the U's would take on Dartford on 21 July. A final pre-season friendly was arranged on 10 July for the visit of League One Gillingham for 28 July.

7 July 2018 Friendly	Maldon & Tiptree	1–4	Colchester United	Maldon
13:00 BST	Warde 30'	Report	Prosser 12'; Szmodics 15'; Collins 27' (pen.); Mandron 60'	Stadium: Wallace Binder Ground

10 July 2018 Friendly	Braintree Town	0–5	Colchester United	Braintree
19:45 BST		Report	Nouble 10'; Mandron 51', 87'; Szmodics 55'; Ogedi-Uzokwe 71'	Stadium: Cressing Road

13 July 2018 Friendly	Colwyn Bay	0–5	Colchester United	Old Colwyn
19:00 BST		Report	Mandron; Lapslie 20'; Collins; Nouble	Stadium: Llanelian Road

17 July 2018 Friendly	Dagenham & Redbridge	1–1	Colchester United	Dagenham
19:30 BST	Cheek 23'	Report	D Wright 84'	Stadium: Victoria Road

21 July 2018 Friendly	Dartford	0–1	Colchester United	Dartford
15:00 BST		Report	Vint 81' (o.g.)	Stadium: Princes Park

24 July 2018 Friendly	Colchester United	2–1	Millwall	Colchester
19:45 BST	Szmodics 20'; Vincent-Young 31'	Report	Wallace 89'	Stadium: Colchester Community Stadium

28 July 2018 Friendly	Colchester United	5–1	Gillingham	Colchester
15:00 BST	Szmodics 5'; Collins 16'; Mandron 30', 57'; Eastman 62'	Report	Parrett 45'; Byrne (red card) 39'	Stadium: Colchester Community Stadium

=== League Two ===
==== Results round by round ====
Round	1	2	3	4	5	6	7	8	9	10	11	12	13	14	15	16	17	18	19	20	21	22	23	24	25	26	27	28	29	30	31	32	33	34	35	36	37	38	39	40	41	42	43	44	45	46
Ground	A	H	A	H	H	A	A	H	A	H	H	A	H	A	A	H	H	A	H	A	H	A	A	H	H	A	H	A	H	A	A	H	A	H	A	H	H	A	H	A	H	A	H	A	H	A
Result	D	W	D	W	L	W	D	W	D	L	W	L	W	W	L	W	W	L	D	W	W	L	W	L	D	L	D	W	L	L	W	W	D	D	L	W	L	L	L	W	L	L	W	D	W	W
Position	13	7	9	3	6	4	5	4	4	5	4	8	6	5	5	5	3	4	3	3	3	3	3	4	4	8	8	4	6	8	8	4	6	5	8	6	7	8	9	8	9	9	9	8	8	8

Updated to match(es) played on 4 May 2019. Source: cu-fc.com
A = Away; H = Home; W = Win; D = Draw; L = Loss

==== League table ====
Pos	Team	Pld	W	D	L	GF	GA	GD	Pts	Promotion, qualification or relegation
6	Tranmere Rovers (O, P)	46	20	13	13	63	50	+13	73	Qualification for League Two play-offs (Note: Four teams play for one spot and promotion to EFL League One.)
7	Newport County	46	20	11	15	59	59	0	71	Qualification for League Two play-offs
8	Colchester United	46	20	10	16	65	53	+12	70	
9	Exeter City	46	19	13	14	60	49	+11	70	
10	Stevenage	46	20	10	16	59	55	+4	70	

Source: EFL Official Website
Rules for classification: 1) Points; 2) Goal difference; 3) Number of goals scored; 4) Head-to-head results
(O) Play-off winners; (P) Promoted

==== Matches ====
On 21 June 2018, the League Two fixtures for the forthcoming season were announced.

4 August 2018 1	Notts County	0–0	Colchester United	Nottingham
15:00 BST		Report		Stadium: Meadow Lane; Attendance: 7,136; Referee: Seb Stockbridge

11 August 2018 2	Colchester United	2–0	Port Vale	Colchester
15:00 BST	Senior 8'; Jackson 23'	Report		Stadium: Colchester Community Stadium; Attendance: 3,183; Referee: Matt Donohue

18 August 2018 3	Mansfield Town	1–1	Colchester United	Mansfield
15:00 BST	Davies 81'	Report	Szmodics 90+5'	Stadium: Field Mill; Attendance: 3,909; Referee: Michael Salisbury

21 August 2018 4	Colchester United	6–0	Crewe Alexandra	Colchester
19:45 BST	Kent 4'; Dickenson 8', 26'; Jackson 59'; Norris 74'; Lapslie 77'	Report		Stadium: Colchester Community Stadium; Attendance: 2,842; Referee: Neil Hair

25 August 2018 5	Colchester United	1–2	Northampton Town	Colchester
15:00 BST	Pierre 90+4' (o.g.)	Report	Crooks 48'; Waters 90+1'	Stadium: Colchester Community Stadium; Attendance: 3,791; Referee: Alan Young

1 September 2018 6	Cheltenham Town	1–3	Colchester United	Cheltenham
15:00 BST	Dawson 56'	Report	Norris 12' (pen.), 26'; Pell 88' (pen.)	Stadium: Whaddon Road; Attendance: 2,789; Referee: Ollie Yates

8 September 2018 7	Tranmere Rovers	1–1	Colchester United	Birkenhead
15:00 BST	Norwood 42'	Report	Pell 61'	Stadium: Prenton Park; Referee: Robert Lewis

15 September 2018 8	Colchester United	3–0	Cambridge United	Colchester
15:00 BST	Szmodics 23'; Nouble 35'; Senior 80'	Report		Stadium: Colchester Community Stadium; Attendance: 4,108; Referee: Lee Swabey

22 September 2018 9	Oldham Athletic	3–3	Colchester United	Oldham
15:00 BST	Surridge 59', 85'; Clarke 88'	Report	Norris 15', 68'; Pell 50'	Stadium: Boundary Park; Attendance: 4,017; Referee: Anthony Backhouse

29 September 2018 10	Colchester United	1–2	Bury	Colchester
15:00 BST	Norris 81' (pen.)	Report	Moore 35'; Dagnall 52'	Stadium: Colchester Community Stadium; Attendance: 3,161; Referee: Thomas Bramall

2 October 2018 11	Colchester United	3–1	Yeovil Town	Colchester
19:45 BST	Eastman 25'; Nouble 59', 84'	Report	James 90+5'	Stadium: Colchester Community Stadium; Attendance: 2,435; Referee: Craig Hicks

6 October 2018 12	Stevenage	3–1	Colchester United	Stevenage
15:00 BST	Guthrie 41'; Kennedy 82' (pen.); Sonupe 84'	Report	Szmodics 2'	Stadium: Broadhall Way; Attendance: 2,763; Referee: Nick Kinseley

13 October 2018 13	Colchester United	3–1	Crawley Town	Colchester
15:00 BST	Szmodics 27'; Nouble 57'; Norris 90'	Report	Morais 40' (pen.); N'Gala (red card) 90+6'	Stadium: Colchester Community Stadium; Attendance: 3,208; Referee: Trevor Kettle

20 October 2018 14	Morecambe	0–1	Colchester United	Morecambe
15:00 BST		Report	Senior 45'	Stadium: Globe Arena; Attendance: 1,839; Referee: Andy Haines

23 October 2018 15	Grimsby Town	1–0	Colchester United	Cleethorpes
19:45 BST	Thomas 65'	Report		Stadium: Blundell Park; Attendance: 3,662; Referee: Graham Salisbury

27 October 2018 16	Colchester United	1–0	Lincoln City	Colchester
15:00 BST	Kent 28'	Report		Stadium: Colchester Community Stadium; Attendance: 4,962; Referee: David Coote

3 November 2018 17	Colchester United	1–0	Swindon Town	Colchester
15:00 GMT	Szmodics 45+5'	Report		Stadium: Colchester Community Stadium; Attendance: 3,227; Referee: Dean Whitestone

17 November 2018 18	Newport County	2–0	Colchester United	Newport
15:00 GMT	Matt 54'; Pring 67'	Report		Stadium: Rodney Parade; Attendance: 3,512; Referee: Roger East

24 November 2018 19	Colchester United	1–1	Exeter City	Colchester
15:00 GMT	Szmodics 67'	Report	Stockley 70'	Stadium: Colchester Community Stadium; Attendance: 3,384; Referee: Ben Toner

27 November 2018 20	Forest Green Rovers	0–1	Colchester United	Nailsworth
19:45 GMT		Report	Szmodics 25'	Stadium: The New Lawn; Attendance: 1,600; Referee: Kevin Johnson

8 December 2018 21	Colchester United	1–0	Macclesfield Town	Colchester
15:00 GMT	Mandron 29'	Report		Stadium: Colchester Community Stadium; Attendance: 3,099; Referee: Neil Hair

15 December 2018 22	Carlisle United	4–0	Colchester United	Carlisle
15:00 GMT	Hope 33'; Yates 51'; Devitt 57'; Grainer 90+5'	Report		Stadium: Brunton Park; Attendance: 3,547; Referee: Eddie Ilderton

22 December 2018 23	Milton Keynes Dons	0–1	Colchester United	Milton Keynes
15:00 GMT		Report	Prosser 11'	Stadium: Stadium MK; Attendance: 7,765; Referee: Chris Sarginson

26 December 2018 24	Colchester United	1–2	Stevenage	Colchester
15:00 GMT	Prosser 83'	Report	Gilmartin 5' (o.g.); Newton 36'	Stadium: Colchester Community Stadium; Attendance: 5,032; Referee: Lee Collins

29 December 2018 25	Colchester United	0–0	Morecambe	Colchester
15:00 GMT		Report		Stadium: Colchester Community Stadium; Attendance: 3,653; Referee: John Busby

1 January 2019 26	Crawley Town	2–0	Colchester United	Crawley
15:00 GMT	McNerney (red card) 32'; Gambin 60', 90'	Report	Kent (yellow card) 49' (yellow-red card) 89'	Stadium: Broadfield Stadium; Attendance: 2,765; Referee: Andy Davies

5 January 2019 27	Colchester United	3–3	Notts County	Colchester
15:00 GMT	Szmodics 8'; Mandron 45+3'; Pell 67' (pen.)	Report	Stead 16'; Jones 19'; Dennis 32'	Stadium: Colchester Community Stadium; Attendance: 3,181; Referee: Charles Breakspear

12 January 2019 28	Port Vale	0–3	Colchester United	Burslem
15:00 GMT		Report	Senior 5'; Pell 18', 69'	Stadium: Vale Park; Attendance: 3,636; Referee: Scott Oldham

19 January 2019 29	Colchester United	2–3	Mansfield Town	Colchester
15:00 GMT	Eastman 14'; Senior 30'	Report	Ajose 51'; Walker 64'; Hamilton 79'	Stadium: Colchester Community Stadium; Attendance: 3,546; Referee: Brett Huxtable

26 January 2019 30	Crewe Alexandra	2–1	Colchester United	Crewe
15:00 GMT	Kirk 48'; Nolan 87'	Report	Szmodics 11'	Stadium: Gresty Road; Attendance: 3,306; Referee: Peter Wright

2 February 2019 31	Northampton Town	0–4	Colchester United	Northampton
15:00 GMT		Report	Nouble 25'; Eisa 50'; Vincent-Young 53'; Szmodics 67'	Stadium: Sixfields Stadium; Attendance: 4,796; Referee: Ross Joyce

9 February 2019 32	Colchester United	3–0	Cheltenham Town	Colchester
15:00 GMT	Vincent-Young 30'; Nouble 43'; Eisa 56'	Report		Stadium: Colchester Community Stadium; Attendance: 3,026; Referee: Craig Hicks

16 February 2019 33	Macclesfield Town	1–1	Colchester United	Macclesfield
15:00 GMT	Wilson 44'	Report	Nouble 47' (pen.)	Stadium: Moss Rose; Attendance: 2,092; Referee: Andy Haines

13 February 2019 34	Colchester United	1–1	Carlisle United	Colchester
15:00 GMT	Kent 84'	Report	Hope 57'	Stadium: Colchester Community Stadium; Attendance: 3,626; Referee: Trevor Kettle

2 March 2019 35	Swindon Town	3–0	Colchester United	Swindon
15:00 GMT	Carroll 39'; Woolfenden 41'; Bennett 66'	Report		Stadium: County Ground; Attendance: 6,082; Referee: Ollie Yates

9 March 2019 36	Colchester United	3–0	Newport County	Colchester
15:00 GMT	Szmodics 20'; Senior 45+2'; Nouble 63'	Report		Stadium: Colchester Community Stadium; Attendance: 3,213; Referee: Lee Collins

12 March 2019 37	Colchester United	0–3	Forest Green Rovers	Colchester
19:45 GMT	Nouble (yellow card) 36' (yellow-red card) 85'	Report	Shephard 21'; Brown 33'; Doidge 81'	Stadium: Colchester Community Stadium; Attendance: 2,871; Referee: Alan Young

16 March 2019 38	Exeter City	3–0	Colchester United	Exeter
15:00 GMT	Jay 45'; Holmes 66'; Law 76'	Report		Stadium: St James Park; Attendance: 3,951; Referee: Scott Oldham

23 March 2019 39	Colchester United	0–2	Tranmere Rovers	Colchester
15:00 GMT		Report	Norwood 23'; Perkins 46'	Stadium: Colchester Community Stadium; Attendance: 3,800; Referee: Ross Joyce

30 March 2019 40	Cambridge United	0–1	Colchester United	Cambridge
15:00 GMT		Report	Vincent-Young 90+6'	Stadium: Abbey Stadium; Attendance: 5,515; Referee: Darren Drysdale

6 April 2019 41	Colchester United	0–2	Oldham Athletic	Colchester
15:00 BST		Report	Iacovitti 6'; Lang 12'	Stadium: Colchester Community Stadium; Attendance: 3,975; Referee: Lee Swabey

13 April 2019 42	Bury	2–0	Colchester United	Bury
15:00 BST	Telford 49', 66'	Report		Stadium: Gigg Lane; Attendance: 3,898; Referee: Andy Haines

19 April 2019 43	Colchester United	1–0	Grimsby Town	Colchester
15:00 BST	Nouble 25'	Report	Collins (yellow card) 90+3' (yellow-red card) 90+5'	Stadium: Colchester Community Stadium; Attendance: 3,677; Referee: Chris Sarginson

22 April 2019 44	Yeovil Town	1–1	Colchester United	Yeovil
15:00 BST	Gray 53'	Report	Eastman 75'; D. Barnes (red card) 55'	Stadium: Huish Park; Attendance: 3,370; Referee: Peter Wright

27 April 2019 45	Colchester United	2–0	Milton Keynes Dons	Colchester
15:00 BST	Szmodics 2'; Kent 47'	Report		Stadium: Colchester Community Stadium; Attendance: 5,000; Referee: Antony Coggins

4 May 2019 46	Lincoln City	0–3	Colchester United	Lincoln
15:00 BST		Report	Dickenson 22'; Szmodics 27', 44'	Stadium: Sincil Bank; Attendance: 9,832; Referee: Trevor Kettle

=== EFL Cup ===
On 15 June 2018, the EFL Cup draw for the first round was made in Vietnam. Colchester were drawn away to Cheltenham Town.

14 August 2018 First round	Cheltenham Town	2–2 (6–5 p)	Colchester United	Cheltenham
19:45 BST	Broom 1'; Thomas 71' (pen.)	Report	Szmodics 79'; Norris 80'	Stadium: Whaddon Road; Attendance: 1,179; Referee: Chris Sarginson
	Penalties
	Thomas (penalty scored); Tozer (penalty scored); Smith (penalty missed); Broom (penalty scored); Kalala (penalty scored); Mullins (penalty scored); Forster (penalty scored)		Norris (penalty missed); Pell (penalty scored); Szmodics (penalty scored); Nouble (penalty scored); Kent (penalty scored); Dickenson (penalty scored); Senior (penalty missed)

=== EFL Trophy ===
On 13 July 2018, the draw for the first round of the EFL Trophy took place. Colchester were in Group B with Essex derby rivals Southend United and former U's manager Joe Dunne's Cambridge United. Southampton under-21s were revealed as Colchester's final opponents on 18 July.

Pos	Lge	Team	Pld	W	PW	PL	L	GF	GA	GD	Pts	Qualification
1	L2	Cambridge United	3	2	0	0	1	8	4	+4	6	Round 2
2	L1	Southend United	3	2	0	0	1	6	3	+3	6	Round 2
3	L2	Colchester United	3	1	0	0	2	3	5	−2	3	
4	ACA	Southampton U21	3	1	0	0	2	2	7	−5	3	

Source: EFL.com

4 September 2018 Group stage	Colchester United	0–2	Southampton U21	Colchester
19:45 BST		Report	Barnes 26'; Obafemi 90+4'	Stadium: Colchester Community Stadium; Attendance: 532

9 October 2018 Group stage	Colchester United	2–0	Southend United	Colchester
19:45 BST	Kent 39'; Collins 49'	Report		Stadium: Colchester Community Stadium; Attendance: 1,516

13 November 2018 Group stage	Cambridge United	3–1	Colchester United	Cambridge
19:00 GMT	Azeez 32', 81'; Osadebe 90+3'	Report	Pell 90+2'	Stadium: Abbey Stadium; Attendance: 598

=== FA Cup ===
The first round draw was made live on BBC on 22 October.

10 November 2018 First round	Accrington Stanley	1–0	Colchester United	Accrington
15:00 GMT	Barlaser 34'	Report		Stadium: Crown Ground; Attendance: 1,267; Referee: Martin Coy

== Squad statistics ==
=== Appearances and goals ===
As of 4 May 2019

No.	Pos	Nat	Player	Total		League Two		FA Cup		EFL Cup		EFL Trophy	
No.	Pos	Nat	Player	Apps	Goals	Apps	Goals	Apps	Goals	Apps	Goals	Apps	Goals
1	GK	(England) ENG	Dillon Barnes	26	0	22	0	0+1	0	1	0	2	0
2	DF	(England) ENG	Ryan Jackson	50	2	46	2	1	0	1	0	1+1	0
4	DF	(England) ENG	Tom Lapslie	36	1	34+1	1	1	0	0	0	0	0
5	DF	(England) ENG	Luke Prosser	41	2	38	2	0+1	0	0	0	2	0
6	DF	(England) ENG	Frankie Kent	44	5	39+1	4	1	0	1	0	2	1
7	FW	(England) ENG	Courtney Senior	46	6	36+5	6	1	0	1	0	2+1	0
8	MF	(England) ENG	Harry Pell	34	7	30+1	6	1	0	1	0	1	1
9	FW	(England) ENG	Luke Norris	36	8	21+13	7	0	0	1	1	1	0
10	MF	(England) ENG	Sammie Szmodics	49	15	44	14	1	0	0+1	1	3	0
11	MF	(England) ENG	Brennan Dickenson	47	3	19+23	3	1	0	1	0	3	0
12	DF	(England) ENG	Aaron Barnes	1	0	0	0	0	0	0	0	1	0
14	MF	(Montserrat) MSR	Brandon Comley	15	0	5+8	0	0	0	1	0	1	0
16	MF	(England) ENG	Diaz Wright	12	0	4+5	0	0	0	0	0	3	0
18	DF	(England) ENG	Tom Eastman	35	3	22+9	3	1	0	1	0	2	0
19	FW	(France) FRA	Mikael Mandron	46	2	16+25	2	0+1	0	1	0	3	0
20	FW	(Nigeria) NGR	Junior Ogedi-Uzokwe	1	0	0+1	0	0	0	0	0	0	0
22	DF	(England) ENG	Kane Vincent-Young	44	3	38+2	3	1	0	0	0	3	0
23	FW	(England) ENG	Ryan Gondoh	6	0	0+4	0	0	0	0	0	0+2	0
24	MF	(England) ENG	Ben Stevenson	14	0	11+3	0	0	0	0	0	0	0
25	GK	(Republic of Ireland) IRL	Rene Gilmartin	24	0	22	0	1	0	0	0	1	0
26	DF	(Republic of Ireland) IRL	Paul Rooney	1	0	0	0	0	0	0	0	1	0
27	MF	(England) ENG	Noah Chilvers	2	0	0+2	0	0	0	0	0	0	0
29	GK	(England) ENG	Ethan Ross	3	0	2+1	0	0	0	0	0	0	0
35	DF	(England) ENG	Ollie Kensdale	3	0	1+1	0	0	0	0	0	1	0
36	MF	(England) ENG	Sam Saunders	6	0	5+1	0	0	0	0	0	0	0
44	FW	(England) ENG	Ryan Clampin	1	0	0	0	0	0	0	0	0+1	0
45	FW	(England) ENG	Frank Nouble	46	9	42+1	9	1	0	0+1	0	0+1	0
47	FW	(England) ENG	Todd Miller	1	0	0+1	0	0	0	0	0	0	0
Players who appeared for Colchester who left during the season
15	FW	(England) ENG	Callum Roberts	3	0	0+3	0	0	0	0	0	0	0
39	FW	(Wales) WAL	Aaron Collins	11	1	1+6	0	0	0	1	0	3	1
39	FW	(Sudan) SDN	Abo Eisa	14	2	8+6	2	0	0	0	0	0	0

=== Goalscorers ===
Place	Number	Nation	Position	Name	League Two	FA Cup	EFL Cup	EFL Trophy	Total
1	10	(England)	AM	Sammie Szmodics	14	0	1	0	15
2	45	(England)	CF	Frank Nouble	9	0	0	0	9
3	9	(England)	CF	Luke Norris	7	0	1	0	8
4	8	(England)	MF	Harry Pell	6	0	0	1	7
5	7	(England)	WG	Courtney Senior	6	0	0	0	6
6	6	(England)	CB	Frankie Kent	4	0	0	1	5
7	18	(England)	CB	Tom Eastman	3	0	0	0	3
7	11	(England)	LWB/LW/FW	Brennan Dickenson	3	0	0	0	3
7	22	(England)	LB/RB	Kane Vincent-Young	3	0	0	0	3
10	2	(England)	RB	Ryan Jackson	2	0	0	0	2
10	5	(England)	CB	Luke Prosser	2	0	0	0	2
10	19	(France)	FW	Mikael Mandron	2	0	0	0	2
10	39	(Sudan)	WG	Abo Eisa	2	0	0	0	2
14	4	(England)	CM	Tom Lapslie	1	0	0	0	1
14	39	(Wales)	CF	Aaron Collins	0	0	0	1	1
				Own goals	1	0	0	0	1
				TOTALS	65	0	2	3	70

=== Disciplinary record ===
Number	Nationality	Position	Player	League Two		FA Cup		EFL Cup		EFL Trophy		Total	
Number	Nationality	Position	Player	Yellow card	Red card	Yellow card	Red card	Yellow card	Red card	Yellow card	Red card	Yellow card	Red card
45	(England)	CF	Frank Nouble	9	1	1	0	0	0	0	0	10	1
6	(England)	CB	Frankie Kent	7	1	1	0	0	0	0	0	8	1
5	(England)	CB	Luke Prosser	9	0	0	0	0	0	0	0	9	0
2	(England)	RB	Ryan Jackson	6	0	0	0	0	0	0	0	6	0
8	(England)	MF	Harry Pell	6	0	0	0	0	0	0	0	6	0
10	(England)	AM	Sammie Szmodics	5	0	0	0	0	0	0	0	5	0
1	(England)	GK	Dillon Barnes	1	1	0	0	0	0	0	0	1	1
4	(England)	CM	Tom Lapslie	4	0	0	0	0	0	0	0	4	0
7	(England)	WG	Courtney Senior	3	0	0	0	1	0	0	0	4	0
11	(England)	LWB/LW/FW	Brennan Dickenson	4	0	0	0	0	0	0	0	4	0
9	(England)	CF	Luke Norris	3	0	0	0	0	0	0	0	3	0
18	(England)	CB	Tom Eastman	3	0	0	0	0	0	0	0	3	0
19	(France)	CF	Mikael Mandron	3	0	0	0	0	0	0	0	3	0
22	(England)	LB/RB	Kane Vincent-Young	3	0	0	0	0	0	0	0	3	0
24	(England)	MF	Ben Stevenson	3	0	0	0	0	0	0	0	3	0
14	(Montserrat)	MF	Brandon Comley	0	0	0	0	1	0	0	0	1	0
29	(England)	GK	Ethan Ross	1	0	0	0	0	0	0	0	1	0
36	(England)	MF	Sam Saunders	1	0	0	0	0	0	0	0	1	0
			TOTALS	67	3	2	0	2	0	0	0	71	3

=== Player debuts ===
Players making their first-team Colchester United debut in a fully competitive match.

Number	Position	Player	Date	Opponent	Ground	Notes
8	MF	(England) Harry Pell	4 August 2018	Notts County	Meadow Lane	
39	CF	(Wales) Aaron Collins	4 August 2018	Notts County	Meadow Lane	
45	CF	(England) Frank Nouble	4 August 2018	Notts County	Meadow Lane	
9	CF	(England) Luke Norris	14 August 2018	Cheltenham Town	Whaddon Road	
12	FB	(England) Aaron Barnes	4 September 2018	Southampton U21	Colchester Community Stadium	
26	DF	(Republic of Ireland) Paul Rooney	4 September 2018	Southampton U21	Colchester Community Stadium	
44	LW	(England) Ryan Clampin	4 September 2018	Southampton U21	Colchester Community Stadium	
35	CB/CM	(England) Ollie Kensdale	13 November 2018	Cambridge United	Abbey Stadium	
15	WG	(England) Callum Roberts	2 February 2019	Northampton Town	Sixfields Stadium	
24	MF	(England) Ben Stevenson	2 February 2019	Northampton Town	Sixfields Stadium	(Note: Second debut for the club.)
39	WG	(Sudan) Abo Eisa	2 February 2019	Northampton Town	Sixfields Stadium	
27	AM	(England) Noah Chilvers	9 March 2019	Newport County	Colchester Community Stadium	
47	WG	(England) Todd Miller	16 March 2019	Exeter City	St James Park	
36	MF	(England) Sam Saunders	30 March 2019	Cambridge United	Abbey Stadium	
29	GK	(England) Ethan Ross	22 April 2019	Yeovil Town	Huish Park	

== Honours and awards ==
=== End-of-season awards ===
Award	Player	Notes
Player of the Year award	(England) Frankie Kent	
Young Player of the Year award	(England) Courtney Senior	
Player's Player of the Year award	(England) Ryan Jackson	
Goal of the Season award	(England) Frank Nouble	
Community Player of the Year award	(Republic of Ireland) Louis Dunne	
Colchester United Supporters Association Player of the Year award	(England) Ryan Jackson	
Colchester United Supporters Association Away Player of the Year award	(England) Tom Lapslie	

== See also ==
- List of Colchester United F.C. seasons
