= Aaron Barnes (footballer) =

English footballer (born 1996)

Personal information
- Full name: Aaron Christopher Barnes
- Date of birth: 14 October 1996 (age 30)
- Place of birth: Croydon, England
- Height: 1.86 m (6 ft 1 in)
- Position: Full-back

Youth career
- 2006–2013: Arsenal
- 2013–2014: Charlton Athletic

Senior career*
Years	Team	Apps	(Gls)
2014–2018	Charlton Athletic	1	(0)
2018	→ Torquay United (loan)	1	(0)
2018–2019	Colchester United	0	(0)
2018	→ Torquay United (loan)	15	(1)
2019–2021	Dulwich Hamlet	39	(1)
2021–2023	Welling United	55	(3)
2023–2024	Hythe Town	31	(8)
2024–2025	Ramsgate	52	(4)
2025–	Faversham Town	11	(0)
- * Club domestic league appearances and goals as of 19:34, 9 January 2025 (UTC)

Aaron Christopher Barnes (born 14 October 1996) is an English professional footballer who plays as a full-back.

Barnes is a product of the Arsenal Academy, where he played from under-11 level until 2013, when he joined Charlton Athletic to continue his development. He made his professional debut at Charlton and experienced a brief loan away in January 2018 at Torquay United. He then made a permanent switch to Colchester United before immediately rejoining Torquay on loan for the rest of the 2017–18 season. He left Colchester at the end of his contract in summer 2019.

== Career ==
=== Arsenal ===
Barnes was born in the London Borough of Croydon but later grew up in Walderslade, Kent and attended Oakwood Park Grammar School in Maidstone. He started his career in the youth team of Arsenal, signing for them at the age of ten in 2006 after he was spotted by scouts whilst representing Kent in a tournament in Denmark. He progressed through the youth system but failed to earn a scholarship and was released in 2013 aged sixteen.

=== Charlton Athletic ===
Barnes signed a scholarship with Charlton Athletic in March 2013, and after a year at the club signed his first professional contract in December 2014. For the next two years he featured predominantly in the under-18 and under-23 academy teams and was rewarded with a new one-year contract in May 2016. He made the progression into the first team during the 2016–17 season and signed a further one-year contract extension in March 2017. He made his professional debut in the final game of the season in April 2017, appearing as a late substitute for Chris Solly in the 3–0 victory over Swindon Town.

On 12 January 2018, Barnes signed for National League side Torquay United in a one-month loan deal. He made his club debut on 27 January in a 1–1 draw at Macclesfield Town.

=== Colchester United ===
On 31 January 2018, Barnes signed for League Two club Colchester United. He was immediately loaned back to Torquay United for the remainder of the season. He scored his first competitive goal on 10 February in Torquay's 2–1 win at Maidenhead United.

On 4 September 2018, Barnes made his Colchester United debut starting in their 2–0 defeat by Southampton Under-21s in the EFL Trophy.

On 14 May 2019, it was announced Barnes was to leave Colchester United at the end of his contract.

=== Dulwich Hamlet ===
On 30 July 2019, Barnes signed for Dulwich Hamlet for the 2019/20 season.

=== Welling United ===
Following two curtailed seasons with Dulwich due to COVID-19, he signed for fellow National League South side Welling United for the 2021–22 season.

On 9 May 2023, Barnes left Welling United.

=== Hythe Town ===
In June 2023, Barnes signed for Isthmian League South East Division club Hythe Town.

=== Ramsgate ===
On 31 May 2024, Barnes joined Isthmian League South East Division side Ramsgate following an impressive season with divisional rivals Hythe Town.

During his first season at the club, he was part of the side that was crowned Isthmian League South East Division champions.

=== Faversham Town ===
On 1 November 2025, Barnes returned to the Isthmian League South East Division, joining Faversham Town. He departed the club in January 2026.

== Career statistics ==
As of match played 3 January 2026

Appearances and goals by club, season and competition
Club	Season	League			FA Cup		League Cup		Other		Total	
Club	Season	Division	Apps	Goals	Apps	Goals	Apps	Goals	Apps	Goals	Apps	Goals
Charlton Athletic	2016–17	League One	1	0	0	0	0	0	0	0	1	0
Charlton Athletic	2017–18	League One	0	0	0	0	0	0	3 (Note: Appearance(s) in EFL Trophy)	0	3	0
Charlton Athletic	Charlton Athletic total		1	0	0	0	0	0	3	0	4	0
Torquay United (loan)	2017–18	National League	1	0	–		–		0	0	1	0
Colchester United	2017–18	League Two	0	0	–		–		0	0	0	0
Colchester United	2018–19	League Two	0	0	0	0	0	0	1	0	1	0
Colchester United	Colchester United total		0	0	0	0	0	0	1	0	1	0
Torquay United (loan)	2017–18	National League	15	1	–		–		0	0	15	1
Dulwich Hamlet	2019–20	National League South	28	1	2	1	–		1 (Note: Appearance(s) in FA Trophy)	0	31	1
Dulwich Hamlet	2020–21	National League South	11	0	1	0	–		2	0	14	0
Dulwich Hamlet	Dulwich Hamlet total		39	1	3	1	0	0	3	0	45	1
Welling United	2021–22	National League South	33	2	1	0	–		1	0	35	2
Welling United	2022–23	National League South	22	1	0	0	–		2	0	24	1
Welling United	Welling United total		55	3	1	0	0	0	3	0	59	3
Hythe Town	2023–24	Isthmian League South East Division	31	8	2	0	—		10 (Note: Seven appearances and three goals in FA Trophy, two appearances in Kent Senior Cup, one appearance in Alan Turvey Trophy)	3	43	11
Ramsgate	2024–25	Isthmian League South East Division	38	4	3	0	—		4 (Note: One appearance in Alan Turvey Trophy, two appearances in FA Trophy, one appearance in Kent Senior Cup)	0	45	4
Ramsgate	2025–26	Isthmian League Premier Division	14	0	1	0	—		2 (Note: One appearance in Kent Senior Cup, one appearance in FA Trophy)	0	17	0
Ramsgate	Total		52	4	4	0	0	0	6	0	62	4
Faversham Town	2025–26	Isthmian League South East Division	11	0	—		—		0	0	11	0
Career total			195	17	10	1	0	0	26	3	231	21

== Honours ==
Ramsgate

- Isthmian League South East Division: 2024–25
