= Ethan Ross (footballer, born 1997) =

English footballer (born 1997)

Personal information
- Full name: Ethan Walker Ross
- Date of birth: 6 March 1997 (age 29)
- Place of birth: Enfield, England
- Height: 6 ft 5 in (1.96 m)
- Position: Goalkeeper

Team information
- Current team: Forest Green Rovers
- Number: 1

Youth career
- Arsenal
- Cambridge United
- –2015: West Bromwich Albion

Senior career*
Years	Team	Apps	(Gls)
2015–2018	West Bromwich Albion	0	(0)
2015–2016	→ Worcester City (loan)	9	(0)
2016–2017	→ Worcester City (loan)	26	(0)
2017	→ Redditch United (loan)	20	(0)
2018–2020	Colchester United	4	(0)
2019	→ Maidstone United (loan)	4	(0)
2020–2021	Lincoln City	0	(0)
2021	→ Weymouth (loan)	26	(0)
2021–2023	Stockport County	7	(0)
2022	→ Aldershot Town (loan)	9	(0)
2022–2023	→ York City (loan)	31	(0)
2023	→ Altrincham (loan)	15	(0)
2023–2026	Altrincham	48	(0)
2026–	Forest Green Rovers	0	(0)
- * Club domestic league appearances and goals as of 16:25, 17 July 2026 (UTC)

Ethan Walker Ross (born 6 March 1997) is an English professional footballer who plays as a goalkeeper for National League club Forest Green Rovers.

He progressed at the youth system at Arsenal and Cambridge United before joining West Bromwich Albion. From here, he had two loan stints with National League North side Worcester City and then Southern League side Redditch United. He then joined Colchester United in 2018 and joined Maidstone United on loan in January 2019. He made his professional debut for Colchester in April 2019. He left Colchester to join Lincoln City in July 2020.

== Career ==
Born in Enfield, London, Ross came through the youth ranks at Arsenal and Cambridge United before joining West Bromwich Albion. He had two loan periods at Worcester City, with his first stint with the National League North side in 2015–16 producing nine league and two cup appearances, and his second stint in 2016–17 appearing 26 times in the league, with one cup appearance. He spent the 2017–18 season with Redditch United. He made 20 appearances in the Southern League Premier Division and played five cup games between September and December.

Ross was released by West Brom at the end of the 2017–18 season and agreed to join League Two club Colchester United on a two-year contract on 7 June 2018. He joined National League side Maidstone United in an initial one-month loan deal on 4 January 2019. He made his debut on 5 January in Maidstone's 2–1 victory at Hartlepool United.

Ross made his professional debut on 22 April 2019 as a substitute during Colchester's League Two 1–1 draw with Yeovil Town after Dillon Barnes had been sent off for violent conduct. He kept a clean sheet during his 40-minutes on the pitch. He made his full debut the following week, keeping a clean sheet in Colchester's 2–0 win against Milton Keynes Dons.

On 24 July 2020, Ross signed for League One club Lincoln City on a one-year deal. He would be loaned to Weymouth on 5 January 2021 until the end of the season. On the 4 June 2021, it was announced that he would be leaving at the expiration of his Lincoln City contract.

On 8 July 2021, Ross signed a three-year deal at National League side Stockport County. On 19 March 2022, Ross joined fellow National League side, Aldershot Town on loan for the remainder of the campaign.

On 1 July 2022, Ross joined York City on loan for the 2022–23 season. He made his debut and kept his first clean sheet for the Minstermen in a 2–0 win over Woking

In July 2023, Ross joined National League club Altrincham on a season-long loan deal. The move was made permanent on 13 October 2023.

On 17 July 2026, Ross joined National League club Forest Green Rovers on a one-year deal.

== Career statistics ==
As of match played 25 February 2023

Appearances and goals by club, season and competition
Club	Season	League			FA Cup		League Cup		Other		Total	
Club	Season	Division	Apps	Goals	Apps	Goals	Apps	Goals	Apps	Goals	Apps	Goals
West Bromwich Albion	2015–16	Premier League	0	0	0	0	0	0	—		0	0
West Bromwich Albion	2016–17	Premier League	0	0	0	0	0	0	—		0	0
West Bromwich Albion	2017–18	Premier League	0	0	0	0	0	0	—		0	0
West Bromwich Albion	Total		0	0	0	0	0	0	—		0	0
Worcester City (loan)	2015–16	National League North	9	0	0	0	—		2 (Note: Appearance(s) in FA Trophy)	0	11	0
Worcester City (loan)	2016–17	National League North	26	0	0	0	—		1	0	27	0
Worcester City (loan)	Total		35	0	0	0	—		3	0	38	0
Redditch United (loan)	2017–18	Southern League; Premier Division	20	0	1	0	—		4 (Note: Appearance in Birmingham Senior Cup) (Note: Appearances in Southern League Cup)	0	25	0
Colchester United	2018–19	League Two	3	0	0	0	0	0	0	0	3	0
Colchester United	2019–20	League Two	1	0	0	0	0	0	4 (Note: Appearances in EFL Trophy)	0	5	0
Colchester United	Total		4	0	0	0	0	0	4	0	8	0
Maidstone United (loan)	2018–19	National League	4	0	—		—		1	0	5	0
Lincoln City	2020–21	League One	0	0	0	0	0	0	2	0	2	0
Weymouth (loan)	2020–21	National League	26	0	0	0	—		0	0	26	0
Stockport County	2021–22	National League	7	0	3	0	—		2	0	12	0
Aldershot Town (loan)	2021–22	National League	9	0	—		—		—		9	0
York City (loan)	2022–23	National League	31	0	1	0	—		0	0	32	0
Career total			136	0	5	0	0	0	16	0	157	0
