= Frankie Kent =

English footballer (born 1995)

Personal information
- Full name: Frankie James Kent
- Date of birth: 21 November 1995 (age 30)
- Place of birth: Romford, England
- Height: 6 ft 2 in (1.88 m)
- Position: Centre back

Team information
- Current team: Oxford United
- Number: 5

Youth career
- 2002–2012: Arsenal
- 2012–2014: Colchester United

Senior career*
Years	Team	Apps	(Gls)
2013–2019	Colchester United	127	(6)
2019–2023	Peterborough United	149	(4)
2023–2026	Heart of Midlothian	73	(3)
2026–	Oxford United	0	(0)
- * Club domestic league appearances and goals as of 17 May 2026

Frankie James Kent (born 21 November 1995) is an English professional footballer who plays as a centre back for Oxford United.

Kent progressed through the Arsenal Academy prior to joining Colchester United's Academy for his two-year scholarship in 2012. He made his professional debut for the club in May 2014 and went on to make 141 appearances in five years with the U's. He subsequently played for Peterborough United, before joining Heart of Midlothian in 2023.

== Career ==
Born in Romford, Kent attended Shenfield High School, with whom he won the 2008 English Schools' Football Association under-12s Schools Cup for boys. He scored in the final held at Wolverhampton Wanderers' Molineux Stadium, doubling Shenfield High's lead early in the second half.

Kent is a product of the Arsenal Academy, where he progressed through each age group from the age of seven to 16. He was released by Arsenal and went on trial at Colchester United.

=== Colchester United ===
Kent joined Colchester's Academy for his two-year scholarship in 2012. During his scholarship, Kent was named captain of the under-18 side. He was first called into the first-team squad by manager Joe Dunne in December 2013, where he was drafted in as defensive cover over the festive period after Northampton Town loanee Ben Tozer had been recalled from his loan at Colchester by his parent club. During the same season, with the under-18s, Kent helped his side earn a league title and cup winning double. He played in the Youth Alliance Cup final held against Bradford City at Valley Parade on 29 April 2014 as the U's won the game 4–2.

Just four days after his under-18s cup triumph, Kent made his professional debut for Colchester United on 3 May 2014. He came on as a half-time substitute for Magnus Okuonghae in a 1–0 away win against Walsall.

==== 2014–15 season ====
Kent made his first League One appearance of the season and his first senior start on 16 August when he replaced the suspended Magnus Okuonghae in the centre of defence for a game against Bristol City at Ashton Gate. He played the full 90 minutes as the U's succumbed to a 2–1 defeat. He was once again called upon on 13 September when he replaced Sammie Szmodics in a tactical substitution in Colchester's 2–0 victory against Leyton Orient at Brisbane Road. He replaced Szmodics prior to half-time after Magnus Okuonghae was dismissed for a serious foul on Dave Mooney. Okuonghae's ensuing four-match ban allowed Kent to make his first home start for the club on 16 September when the U's fell to a 3–2 defeat to Sheffield United, in which Colchester squandered a two-goal lead by conceding three goals in six second-half minutes. In Okuonghae's absence, Kent established himself as a first-team regular, and with his contract set to expire at the end of the season, he was rewarded with a three-and-a-half-year contract extension, which he signed on 16 October 2014.

Kent once again held a starting berth for Colchester's home clash with Chesterfield on 21 October. However, less than one minute into the game, Kent fell to the ground after being struck in the head by the ball. Meanwhile, referee Darren Sheldrake allowed play to continue, as the Spireites scored through Sam Clucas. Kent then received four minutes of treatment on the field before being replaced by Magnus Okuonghae. After being stretchered off the pitch, Kent reappeared on the sidelines before the first-half ended.

Following his injury, Kent returned to action in Colchester's 2–1 home defeat by Port Vale on 1 November. It would prove to be his last game of the season, after suffering a knee injury that ruled him out of action until March 2015. A slip in a training session in March set back his recovery, and he failed to regain fitness before the end of the campaign.

==== 2015–16 season ====
Kent returned to first-team action in the 3–2 EFL Trophy defeat at Northampton Town on 1 September 2015, playing the full 90 minutes. After making 29 appearances in the 2015–16 season, Kent was named as Colchester's Young Player of the Year at the club's end of season awards on 13 May 2016.

==== 2016–17 season ====
Early in the 2016–17 season, Kent was close to leaving the club on loan following his recovery from tendonitis. However, in November 2016, manager John McGreal switched tactics to utilise three central defenders, and Kent began a run of form alongside Tom Eastman and George Elokobi that would see Colchester through a nine-game unbeaten run. As a result, Kent was awarded the EFL Young Player of the Month for December. Kent was then ruled out for the remainder of the season after suffering ruptured ankle ligaments during Colchester's 2–1 win against Barnet on 11 February 2017, having made 15 first-team appearances.

==== 2017–18 season ====
Kent scored his first professional goal on 9 August 2017 during Colchester's 2–1 EFL Cup defeat to Aston Villa. He also scored an own goal in the match. He then scored his first league goal on 26 August against Forest Green Rovers.

On 21 September, Kent signed a new contract to keep him with the club until summer 2020.

==== 2018–19 season ====
Kent received the first red card of his career on 1 January 2019 in the 89th minute of Colchester's 2–0 defeat at Crawley Town for a second bookable offence. Having been named as Colchester United's Young Player of the Year in 2016, Kent was named the Colchester United Player of the Year for the 2018–19 season in an awards ceremony held on 29 April 2019.

=== Peterborough United ===
On 22 June 2019, Kent signed for League One side Peterborough United on a three-year contract for an undisclosed fee.

=== Heart of Midlothian ===
On 24 July 2023, Kent signed for Scottish Premiership side Heart of Midlothian for an undisclosed fee.

=== Oxford United ===
On 27 June 2026, Kent signed for EFL League One club Oxford United.

== Style of play ==
Ex Colchester manager John McGreal, who had worked with Kent from his arrival at the club to the first-team, said of Kent:

He's a ball-playing centre-back, he's 6ft 2ins, he's getting more aggressive with his play and his reading of the game is excellent.

== Career statistics ==
As of end of 2025–26 season

Appearances and goals by club, season and competition
Club	Season	League			National cup (Note: Includes FA Cup, Scottish Cup)		League cup (Note: Includes EFL Cup, Scottish League Cup)		Other		Total	
Club	Season	Division	Apps	Goals	Apps	Goals	Apps	Goals	Apps	Goals	Apps	Goals
Colchester United	2013–14	League One	1	0	0	0	0	0	0	0	1	0
Colchester United	2014–15	League One	10	0	0	0	0	0	1 (Note: Appearance(s) in the Football League Trophy)	0	11	0
Colchester United	2015–16	League One	26	0	2	0	0	0	1	0	29	0
Colchester United	2016–17	League Two	13	0	0	0	1	0	1	0	15	0
Colchester United	2017–18	League Two	37	2	1	0	1	1	2	0	41	3
Colchester United	2018–19	League Two	40	4	1	0	1	0	2	1	44	5
Colchester United	Total		127	6	4	0	3	1	7	1	141	8
Peterborough United	2019–20	League One	28	1	3	1	1	0	2	0	34	2
Peterborough United	2020–21	League One	45	1	2	0	1	0	2	1	50	2
Peterborough United	2021–22	Championship	34	0	2	0	1	0	0	0	37	0
Peterborough United	2022–23	League One	42	2	2	0	1	0	4	0	49	2
Peterborough United	Total		149	4	9	1	4	0	8	1	170	6
Heart of Midlothian	2023–24	Scottish Premiership	35	0	2	1	3	0	4	0	44	1
Heart of Midlothian	2024–25	Scottish Premiership	18	2	1	0	0	0	7 (Note: Two appearances in UEFA Europa League play-offs, five appearances in UEFA Conference League)	0	26	2
Heart of Midlothian	2025–26	Scottish Premiership	20	1	1	0	4	0	0	0	25	1
Heart of Midlothian	Total		73	3	4	1	7	0	11	0	95	4
Oxford United	2026–27	League One	0	0	0	0	0	0	0	0	0	0
Career total			349	13	17	2	14	1	26	2	406	18

== Honours ==
Peterborough United

- League One runner-up: 2020–21

Colchester United U18

- 2013–14 Football League Youth Alliance South East winner
- 2013–14 Football League Youth Alliance Cup winner

Individual

- 2016 Colchester United Young Player of the Year
- December 2016 EFL Young Player of the Month
- 2019 Colchester United Player of the Year
