= Kane Vincent-Young =

Grenadian footballer (born 1996)

Personal information
- Full name: Kane Vincent-Young
- Date of birth: 15 March 1996 (age 30)
- Place of birth: Camden, London, England
- Height: 5 ft 11 in (1.80 m)
- Position: Full-back

Team information
- Current team: Colchester United
- Number: 30

Youth career
- 2007–2014: Tottenham Hotspur
- 2014–2015: Colchester United

Senior career*
Years	Team	Apps	(Gls)
2014	Banbury United	2	(0)
2015–2019	Colchester United	112	(4)
2019–2023	Ipswich Town	49	(2)
2023–2024	Wycombe Wanderers	17	(0)
2025–	Colchester United	48	(0)

International career^{‡}
2024–	Grenada	8	(0)
- * Club domestic league appearances and goals as of 21:11, 25 May 2026 ‡ National team caps and goals as of 21:08, 25 May 2026 (UTC)

Kane Vincent-Young (born 15 March 1996) is a Grenadian professional footballer who plays as a full-back for EFL League Two club Colchester United. Born in England, he plays for the Grenada national team.

Vincent-Young progressed through the Academy at Tottenham Hotspur, spending seven years at the North London club before being released in 2014. He briefly played for Banbury United in 2014 before he joined Colchester United's Academy for the 2014–15 season. He made his professional debut for the club in August 2015. He spent four seasons at The U's, making over one hundred appearances before joining Ipswich Town in 2019.

== Club career ==
=== Early career ===
Born in Camden, London, Vincent-Young joined the Tottenham Hotspur Academy when he was 11 years old. He was on the books at Tottenham for 7 years, where he progressed through the club's youth system before he was released in July 2014 at the end of his youth scholarship. Following his release from Tottenham, he had a short spell with Southern League Premier Division side Banbury United, for whom he made two appearances in August 2014.

=== Colchester United ===
After a trial with League One side Colchester United, Vincent-Young signed a one-year development contract with the club's Academy on 23 September 2014. After impressing in the Colchester under-21 side, he made his first away trip with the first-team on 20 December 2014 as Colchester beat Yeovil Town 2–0, featuring on the bench but not receiving any game time.

Vincent-Young featured regularly during Colchester's pre-season preparations for the 2015–16 season. He played for the full 90 minutes during three first-team pre-season friendlies and was selected in manager Tony Humes' squad to face Blackpool for the opening day fixture. He came off the bench to make his professional debut on 8 August, replacing Matthew Briggs at left-back on 79 minutes in the 2–2 draw. Following his debut, he signed a two-year contract extension with the club on 14 August. In the absence of Briggs for the visit of Oldham Athletic on 18 August, Vincent-Young made his first competitive start for the club at the Colchester Community Stadium, helping his side to their first clean sheet of the season and playing the full 90 minutes.

After eight League One appearances for Colchester, Vincent-Young suffered an Achilles injury which ruled him out of action for two months. He made his return from injury on 12 December as a second-half substitute for Matthew Briggs during Colchester's 3–2 home defeat by Barnsley. He ended the season with 16 appearances in his maiden campaign.

Vincent-Young made regular first-team appearances for Colchester during the 2016–17 season, playing 18 times in League Two and making a further five appearances in cup competitions. He signed a one-year contract extension with the club on 29 June 2017.

Vincent-Young scored his first professional goal on 26 August 2017 in Colchester's 5–1 win against Forest Green Rovers. This goal won the club's 'Goal of the Year' award at the annual end of season dinner, while he also won the club's 'Young Player of the Year' award. He made 41 appearances for Colchester across the season, his highest figure to date.

With his contract at Colchester now expired, Vincent-Young joined up with Ipswich Town on trial for their pre-season training camp in Spain in July 2018. He later returned to the U's and featured in a number of pre-season friendly fixtures for the club before signing a new two-year contract on 6 August. He made 44 appearances in all competitions over the course of the 2018–19 season, scoring 3 goals, including the winner in a 1–0 win over Cambridge United at the Abbey Stadium.

=== Ipswich Town ===
==== 2019–20 season ====
On 19 August 2019, Vincent-Young signed for Ipswich Town for an undisclosed fee, signing a four-year deal, with the option of an additional year extension. He made his debut for the club in a 0–5 away win over Bolton Wanderers at the University of Bolton Stadium, on 24 August 2019. He scored his first goal for the club on 21 September 2019, netting the winner in a 0–1 away win over Gillingham at the Priestfield Stadium. He scored his second goal for the club in the following game, scoring the fourth goal in a 4–1 home win over Tranmere Rovers at Portman Road. Vincent-Young's form earned him the PFA Fans' League One Player of the Month award for September. In November 2019 it was announced that he would be out of action for a few weeks after undergoing a groin operation. He required a further operation on an adductor tendon injury later in the month, ruling him out of action for three months. He returned to training in February 2020 while completing his injury rehabilitation, although he did not feature before the end of the season as the football season was curtailed early due to the COVID-19 pandemic.

==== 2020–21 season ====
Vincent-Young returned to first-team training during the 2020 pre-season, featuring in friendly matches against former clubs Colchester United and Tottenham Hotspur. He picked up an achilles injury during pre-season, resulting in another spell on the sidelines. Despite starting to return to training towards the end of 2020, it was confirmed on 4 February 2021 that Vincent-Young had suffered a setback to his recovery and would be out for at least another 6 weeks. Vincent-Young made his first appearance since October 2019 on 20 March 2021, coming on as a second-half substitute in a match away against Portsmouth. He made his first start in 18 months in Ipswich's next game away at Wigan Athletic, only to be substituted at halftime with a hamstring problem. He returned from injury on 17 April, starting in a 0–0 draw with Charlton Athletic. He maintained a run in the team for the remainder of the season, before suffering a dislocated shoulder in the penultimate match of the season against Shrewsbury Town, an injury which would later require surgery. He made 7 appearances during the 2020–21 season following his return from injury.

=== Wycombe Wanderers ===
Vincent-Young signed for Wycombe Wanderers on 13 July 2023.

=== Return to Colchester ===
After spending six months without a club Kane re-joined Colchester United on 3 February 2025 on a deal until the end of the 2024–25 season.

He made his second debut for the club as a late substitute in their 2–1 home victory over leaders Walsall. He extended his contract with the club on 27 July 2026.

== International career ==
Vincent-Young was called up to the Grenada national team for a set of 2024–25 CONCACAF Nations League matches in October 2024.

== Personal life ==
At the beginning of the COVID-19 pandemic in March 2020, Vincent-Young took part in a campaign organized by Ipswich Town called Keep the Town Talking which saw players, coaching staff and club staff reach out to elderly season ticket holders at a time where the Government had advised over-70s to avoid all social contact and self-isolate for up to four months during the crisis. He regularly spoke to season ticket holders each week and continued to do so long after the restrictions had been lifted. His efforts in the community earned him Ipswich's PFA Community Champion award for the 2020–21 season.

== Career statistics ==
=== Club ===
As of match played 9 February 2026

Appearances and goals by club, season and competition
Club	Season	League			FA Cup		League Cup		Other		Total	
Club	Season	Division	Apps	Goals	Apps	Goals	Apps	Goals	Apps	Goals	Apps	Goals
Banbury United	2014–15	SL Premier Division	2	0	0	0	–		0	0	2	0
Colchester United	2015–16	League One	14	0	2	0	0	0	0	0	16	0
Colchester United	2016–17	League Two	18	0	1	0	1	0	3 (Note: Appearance(s) in EFL Trophy)	0	23	0
Colchester United	2017–18	League Two	38	1	0	0	0	0	3	0	41	1
Colchester United	2018–19	League Two	40	3	1	0	0	0	3	0	44	3
Colchester United	2019–20	League Two	2	0	0	0	0	0	0	0	2	0
Colchester United	Total		112	4	4	0	1	0	9	0	126	4
Ipswich Town	2019–20	League One	9	2	0	0	0	0	0	0	9	2
Ipswich Town	2020–21	League One	7	0	0	0	0	0	0	0	7	0
Ipswich Town	2021–22	League One	15	0	3	0	0	0	4	0	22	0
Ipswich Town	2022–23	League One	18	0	3	0	1	0	4	0	26	0
Ipswich Town	Total		49	2	6	0	1	0	8	0	64	2
Wycombe Wanderers	2023–24	League One	17	0	0	0	1	0	3	0	21	0
Colchester United	2024–25	League Two	10	0	0	0	0	0	0	0	10	0
Colchester United	2025–26	League Two	38	0	1	0	1	0	1	0	41	0
Colchester United	Total		160	4	5	0	2	0	10	0	177	4
Career total			217	6	11	0	4	0	21	0	264	6

=== International ===
As of match played 16 May 2026

Appearances and goals by national team and year
National team	Year	Apps	Goals
Grenada	2024	4	0
Grenada	2025	3	0
Grenada	2026	1	0
Total		8	0

== Honours ==
Ipswich Town

- EFL League One runner-up: 2022–23

Wycombe Wanderers

- EFL Trophy runner-up: 2023–24

Individual

- Colchester United Goal of the Season: 2017–18
- Colchester United Young Player of the Year: 2017–18
- PFA Fans' League One Player of the Month: September 2019
