= Courtney Senior =

English footballer (born 1997)

Personal information
- Full name: Courtney Fitzroy Senior
- Date of birth: 30 June 1997 (age 29)
- Place of birth: Croydon, England
- Height: 1.75 m (5 ft 9 in)
- Position: Winger

Team information
- Current team: Braintree Town
- Number: 7

Youth career
- 2011–2015: Brentford

Senior career*
Years	Team	Apps	(Gls)
2015–2016	Brentford	0	(0)
2015	→ Wycombe Wanderers (loan)	1	(0)
2016–2021	Colchester United	124	(12)
2021–2022	Newport County	0	(0)
2022–2023	AFC Wimbledon	7	(1)
2023–2024	Barnet	21	(1)
2023–2024	→ Yeovil Town (loan)	4	(0)
2024	→ Hartlepool United (loan)	4	(0)
2024–2025	Rochdale	6	(0)
2024–2025	→ Chorley (loan)	7	(0)
2025	→ Chorley (loan)	5	(1)
2025–2026	Maldon & Tiptree	13	(1)
2026	Farnborough	13	(4)
2026–	Braintree Town	13	(1)
- * Club domestic league appearances and goals as of 16:45, 1 November 2026 (UTC)

Courtney Fitzroy Senior (born 30 June 1997) is an English professional footballer who plays as a winger for National League South club Braintree Town.

He is a product of the Brentford Academy and made his professional debut on loan at League Two club Wycombe Wanderers in February 2015. He joined Colchester United in June 2016, where he made 145 appearances and scored 14 goals in five years with the club.

== Career ==
Born in Croydon, Senior began his career in the Brentford Academy. He was a member of the Brentford under-15 team that triumphed in the Junior category of the 2012 Milk Cup and during the 2012–13 season he broke into the youth team and also made four appearances for the Development Squad. After signing a two-year scholarship deal in the summer of 2013, Senior topped the youth team appearance charts during the 2013–14 season with 25 appearances. After 25 youth and Development Squad appearances during the 2014–15 season, Senior signed a two-year Development Squad contract in June 2015. Senior made first team debut for Brentford in a 4–0 League Cup defeat by Oxford United on 11 August 2015, starting the match and playing for 75-minutes before being substituted for Akaki Gogia. He was an unused substitute on two further occasions in August 2015, but failed to make an appearance. After scoring two goals in 15 Development Squad appearances during the 2015–16 season, Senior departed Brentford on 28 June 2016, having made just one first team appearance at Griffin Park.

Senior signed for League Two side Wycombe Wanderers on a one-month youth loan on 9 January 2015. He made the first professional appearance of his career on 10 February 2015, coming on as a second-half substitute for Fred Onyedinma during a 2–0 home defeat by Plymouth Argyle. He returned to his parent club the following day.

On 28 June 2016, Senior joined League Two club Colchester United on a two-year contract. Before he could receive a call into the first team squad, Senior was ruled out of the 2016–17 season after undergoing knee surgery in August 2016. He returned to fitness in July 2017 and made his debut for the club as an 85th-minute substitute for Drey Wright in a league match versus Forest Green Rovers on 26 August 2017. Five minutes later, in injury time, Senior scored the first professional goal of his career with a tap-in. He broke into the squad on a full-time basis in January 2018 and signed a new two-year contract on 18 April. Senior finished the 2017–18 season with 19 appearances and four goals. 2018–19 proved to be Senior's breakthrough season and he made 47 appearances and scored six goals on his way to winning the club's Young Player of the Year award.

At the end of the 2020–21 season, Senior was released by Colchester United. He had scored 14 goals in 145 appearances for the U's in five years with the club.

On 6 July 2021, Senior joined fellow League Two side Newport County on a one-year deal. On 28 July 2021 Senior sustained a pre-season cruciate ligament injury which ruled him out of action for six to nine months. Although he returned to training towards the end of the season, Senior never played a competitive game for Newport and he was released by Newport County at the end of the 2021–22 season.

On 1 October 2022, Senior joined AFC Wimbledon on a short-term deal. He scored his first goal for the club on 29 October 2022 in a 3–2 win over Harrogate Town. Senior left the Dons upon the expiry of his contract on 31 January 2023.

Senior signed for Barnet on 18 February 2023. On 22 December 2023, Senior joined Yeovil Town on a one-month loan deal. On 26 January 2024, Senior signed for National League club Hartlepool United. On 27 February 2024, Senior returned to Barnet after the expiration of his loan deal. Senior made four appearances in total for Hartlepool. He was released by Barnet at the end of the 2023-24 season.

On 9 August 2024, Senior signed a one-year contract with Rochdale. On 6 December 2024, Senior joined National League North side Chorley on an initial one-month loan deal. On 28 March 2025, he returned to Chorley on loan for the remainder of the season.

On 5 September 2025, Senior joined Isthmian League North Division club Maldon & Tiptree.

On 19 February 2026, Senior joined National League South side, Farnborough on a deal until the end of the 2025–26 campaign.

On 10 July 2026, following his departure from Farnborough, Senior joined fellow National League South side, Braintree Town.

== Career statistics ==
As of match played 31 October 2026

Appearances and goals by club, season and competition
Club	Season	League			FA Cup		EFL Cup		Other		Total	
Club	Season	Division	Apps	Goals	Apps	Goals	Apps	Goals	Apps	Goals	Apps	Goals
Brentford	2014–15	Championship	0	0	0	0	0	0	0	0	0	0
Brentford	2015–16	Championship	0	0	0	0	1	0	—		1	0
Brentford	Total		0	0	0	0	1	0	0	0	1	0
Wycombe Wanderers (loan)	2014–15	League Two	1	0	—		—		—		1	0
Colchester United	2016–17	League Two	0	0	0	0	0	0	0	0	0	0
Colchester United	2017–18	League Two	18	4	0	0	0	0	1 (Note: Appearance(s) in EFL Trophy)	0	19	4
Colchester United	2018–19	League Two	42	6	1	0	1	0	3	0	47	6
Colchester United	2019–20	League Two	29	2	1	0	4	1	6 (Note: Four appearances in EFL Trophy, two appearances and one goal in EFL League Two play-offs)	1	40	4
Colchester United	2020–21	League Two	35	0	1	0	1	0	2	0	39	0
Colchester United	Total		124	12	3	0	6	1	12	1	145	14
Newport County	2021–22	League Two	0	0	0	0	0	0	0	0	0	0
AFC Wimbledon	2022–23	League Two	7	1	3	0	0	0	3	0	13	1
Barnet	2022–23	National League	12	1	—		—		2 (Note: One appearance in FA Trophy, one appearance in National League playoffs)	0	14	1
Barnet	2023–24	National League	9	0	2	0	—		2 (Note: One appearance in FA Trophy, one appearance in Middlesex Senior Cup)	1	13	1
Barnet	Total		21	1	2	0	—		4	1	27	2
Yeovil Town (loan)	2023–24	National League South	4	0	—		—		—		4	0
Hartlepool United (loan)	2023–24	National League	4	0	—		—		—		4	0
Rochdale	2024–25	National League	6	0	2	0	—		1	0	9	0
Chorley (loan)	2024–25	National League North	12	1	0	0	—		4	0	16	1
Maldon & Tiptree	2025–26	Isthmian League North Division	13	1	3	0	—		1 (Note: Appearance(s) in FA Trophy)	0	17	1
Farnborough	2025–26	National League South	13	4	—		—		—		13	4
Braintree Town	2026–27	National League South	13	1	3	0	—		3 (Note: Appearance(s) in National League Cup)	0	19	1
Career total			205	20	13	0	7	1	27	2	252	23

== Honours ==
Individual

- Colchester United Young Player of the Year: 2018–19
