= Byron Lawrence =

English footballer (born 1996)

Personal information
- Full name: Byron Alfredo Lawrence
- Date of birth: 12 March 1996 (age 30)
- Place of birth: Cambridge, England
- Height: 1.70 m (5 ft 7 in)
- Position: Midfielder

Team information
- Current team: Ipswich Wanderers

Youth career
- –2010: Histon
- 2010–2012: Ipswich Town

Senior career*
Years	Team	Apps	(Gls)
2012–2014	Ipswich Town	1	(0)
2014–2016	Colchester United	1	(0)
2016	Bishop's Stortford	11	(0)
2016–2017	Leiston	31	(8)
2017–2018	Billericay Town	8	(0)
2017–2018	→ Leiston (loan)	44	(5)
2018	Dulwich Hamlet	2	(0)
2018–2020	Leiston	56	(5)
2019	→ Braintree Town (loan)	2	(0)
2020–2024	Needham Market	31	(6)
2023–2024	→ Ipswich Wanderers (loan)	6	(1)
2024	St Ives Town	5	(0)
2024–	Ipswich Wanderers	1	(0)
- * Club domestic league appearances and goals as of 12:38, 27 September 2024 (UTC)

Byron Alfredo Lawrence (born 12 March 1996) is an English semi-professional footballer who plays as a midfielder for Ipswich Wanderers.

== Playing career ==
=== Ipswich Town ===
Born in Cambridge, Lawrence came through the youth system at Histon, before joining Ipswich Town's Academy in 2010 at the age of 14.

==== 2010–11 season ====
Lawrence was involved with Ipswich's under-18 side immediately after joining, scoring in a 2–1 friendly win over Bury Town on 10 August 2010. He scored twice in the under-18s 2–1 win at West Ham United on 9 October, before netting again in Town's 3–2 defeat to Southampton a week later. He scored four goals in 13 under-18 appearances during the 2010–11 season.

==== 2011–12 season ====
Lawrence was called up by first-team manager Paul Jewell for their League Cup clash with Northampton Town on 9 August 2011, but was an unused substitute in the match. He had impressed Jewell with his performances in the Milk Cup in Northern Ireland and against Manchester United at under-15 level over the summer. Lawrence returned to action with the under-18s, scoring the third goal in their 3–0 home win against Leicester City on 17 September. He signed a two-year scholarship with Ipswich in November 2011, where Paul Jewell revealed that Lawrence had been training with the first-team. Jewell said of Lawrence that "he reminds me of Jack Wilshere. He's built that way, he uses his body and he's a clever player."

Lawrence scored the opening goal in an eventual 3–1 FA Youth Cup defeat to Burnley at Turf Moor on 13 January 2012. He also appeared for the Ipswich Town Reserves side for the first time in 2012, playing in a 1–0 win over Crystal Palace at Playford Road on 21 February. Jewell then stated that he intended to hand some game time to Lawrence before the end of the season in April 2012. He eventually became Town's second youngest-ever debutant on 28 April 2012, replacing Jay Emmanuel-Thomas after 79 minutes in the Blues' 3–2 win over already-relegated Doncaster Rovers. He ended the 2011–12 season with 22 under-18 games and two goals to his name, with two reserve appearances in addition to his substitute appearance for the first-team.

==== 2012–13 season ====
Paul Jewell included Lawrence in his squad for a pre-season tour of the Netherlands in July 2012. He featured in the first half of a 1–1 draw with Eerste Divisie side Helmond Sport on 17 July, and on their return to England, he appeared in a first-team 2–0 friendly win at Cambridge United on 25 July. He scored a brace for the reserve side in a 6–1 hammering of A.F.C. Sudbury on 1 August, before featuring for 22 minutes as a second-half substitute in Town's 3–1 friendly win against West Ham at Portman Road three days later. He was again named on the bench for the League Cup clash with Carlisle United on 29 August, but was unused in the 2–1 defeat after extra time. He scored for the under-18 side in a 3–2 home defeat by Colchester United on 6 October, before he netted a late equaliser in the under-21s 2–2 draw with Brentford at Griffin Park on 30 October. He grabbed a goal in a 4–2 win for the under-18s against Brighton & Hove Albion on 2 February 2013, and was on target again in a 3–1 reverse at Bristol City on 16 February.

Lawrence captained the under-21 side to a 4–3 win at Portman Road over Colchester on 25 February, while his next goal arrived against the same opposition at under-17 level with a penalty on 4 May as Town fell to a 3–1 defeat. He travelled with the under-17 side on their tour of Belgium in May 2013, where he scored in their 1–1 draw with Mons. He netted two further goals in the competition, one against Gent from the penalty spot, and another in a 2–1 defeat to Sint-Truiden, meaning Town finished seventh overall. His campaign ended with three goals in 23 reserve team appearances, and three goals in eight youth team appearances.

==== 2013–14 season ====
Lawrence began the 2013–14 season once again with pre-season alongside the first-team squad. He appeared in their tour of Ireland, starting the second half in Town's 2–0 victory over Shelbourne on 6 July. He again started the second-half squad for Ipswich's 2–1 friendly win at Crawley Town on 10 July, before making an appearance as a substitute in their 2–1 win at Gillingham on 16 July. He was also involved in the 3–0 win at the Colchester Community Stadium against Colchester on 23 July. Seven days later, he faced the same opposition for the under-21 side at Playford Road as Town won 1–0.

He was again an unused substitute for the first-team's FA Cup third round defeat to Preston North End on 14 January 2014. He scored a goal for the under-18 squad on 15 March as Ipswich were defeated 3–1 by Queens Park Rangers, and then netted again five days later as the under-18s beat Bristol City 3–0 away. He scored in a friendly between Ipswich and Peterborough United's development squads on 28 April, in which Town came out 5–2 victors. Lawrence ended the season with a further 17 reserve team appearances and one goal to add to his tally, and two goals in seven games at youth level.

==== 2014–15 season ====
For a second year running, Lawrence was involved in Town's first-team pre-season training camp based in Ireland, where he began the second half of a 4–0 win against Shelbourne on 12 July 2014. He scored in a 4–2 win for an Ipswich Town XI against Chelmsford City on 1 August, where he headed home from close range following a Ben Wyatt cross.

Lawrence then joined Colchester United on trial, training with the U's in mid-August 2014. He played for the under-21s in their Professional Development League Two opening game against Sheffield United on 20 August, a game which ended 0–0. Soon after, Ipswich boss Mick McCarthy confirmed that Lawrence was able to leave the club on a permanent basis. He made his second appearance for Colchester under-21s on 1 September as they fell to a 3–1 home defeat to Nottingham Forest. During his brief 2014–15 season with Ipswich, Lawrence made four reserve appearances, where he scored one goal.

=== Colchester United ===
Lawrence became new Colchester United manager Tony Humes' first signing on 2 September 2014, the day after Humes' appointment and the day after Lawrence had appeared for the under-21s in their defeat to Nottingham Forest. He joined the U's on a one-year deal. He was immediately called up to the first-team squad by Humes for their trip to face Walsall on 6 September at the Bescot Stadium. Despite not appearing against Walsall, he did score a brace for the under-21s in a 3–1 win at Gresty Road against Crewe Alexandra on 9 September. He gave Colchester the lead after the half-time interval after George Cooper's opener had been cancelled out by a Craig Eastmond strike, and then scored his second and Colchester's third with a shot from outside of the area.

Tony Humes handed Lawrence his first-team debut for Colchester on 16 September at home to Sheffield United. He came on as a 76th-minute substitute for Sammie Szmodics when the U's were 1–0 up, and Freddie Sears made it 2–0 one minute after Lawrence's arrival on the field. However, a quickfire trio of goals in the last seven minutes of the game for the Blades handed them a 3–2 win over Colchester. After the match, Lawrence said of his first game for Colchester that it was "a debut to remember but it was a good experience". He also spoke of his exit from Ipswich, stating that "I always tried my best to kick on at Ipswich but I knew that I needed to move on to play", and that Mick McCarthy "thought I was a good player but not quite good enough to play in his team".

Lawrence returned to under-21 action with a goal in their 2–2 draw with Coventry City at Florence Park after converting a Drey Wright cross within the first minute of the game on 23 September. He turned provider in Colchester's 2–1 win at Elland Road against Leeds United on 21 October, setting up Dominic Smith who went on to score both goals in the game.

On 8 May 2015, Lawrence signed a one-year contract extension with Colchester United. However, after just one first-team appearance, Lawrence was released from his contract by mutual consent on 18 January 2016.

=== Bishop's Stortford ===
After training with several clubs, Lawrence signed for National League South outfit Bishop's Stortford on 5 February 2016. He made a 12-minute substitute appearance for his debut on 6 February in a 2–1 defeat by Ebbsfleet United.

=== Leiston ===
After making eleven appearances for Bishop's Stortford, Lawrence moved to Isthmian League Premier Division side Leiston in summer 2016 on a one-year contract with the option of a further year. He made two assists on his debut on the opening day of the season as Leiston defeated Havant & Waterlooville 3–1. He scored his first goals for the club in the following game against Canvey Island with his side's first and third goals of a 3–2 away win on 16 August.

=== Billericay Town ===
On 17 March 2017, Lawrence moved to Isthmian League Premier Division rivals Billericay Town.

=== Dulwich Hamlet ===
On 6 June 2018 Lawrence moved to Dulwich Hamlet, ahead of their inaugural season in the National League South.

=== Braintree Town ===
On 3 October 2019 Lawrence moved to National League South side Braintree Town. In total Byron made two appearances for the club.

=== Return to Leiston ===
On 11 November 2019, Leiston announced former Braintree Town manager Glen Driver as their new manager, and confirmed that Lawrence had ended his loan spell and returned to Leiston.

=== Needham Market ===
It was announced the 27 May 2020 that Lawrence had departed Leiston and joined fellow Southern League Premier Division Central team Needham Market, becoming the club's second signing of the season.

In November 2023, Lawrence joined Ipswich Wanderers on a dual-registration basis.

== Career statistics ==
As of match played 27 May 2020.

Club	Season	League			FA Cup		League Cup		Other		Total	
Club	Season	Division	Apps	Goals	Apps	Goals	Apps	Goals	Apps	Goals	Apps	Goals
Ipswich Town	2011–12	Championship	1	0	0	0	0	0	—		1	0
Ipswich Town	2012–13	Championship	0	0	0	0	0	0	—		0	0
Ipswich Town	2013–14	Championship	0	0	0	0	0	0	—		0	0
Ipswich Town	2014–15	Championship	0	0	0	0	0	0	—		0	0
Ipswich Town	Total		1	0	0	0	0	0	—		1	0
Colchester United	2014–15	League One	1	0	0	0	0	0	0	0	1	0
Bishop's Stortford	2015–16	National League South	11	0	0	0	—		0	0	11	0
Leiston	2016–17	Isthmian League Premier Division	31	8	3	2	—		5 (Note: Appearance(s) in FA Trophy)	0	39	10
Billericay Town	2016–17	Isthmian League Premier Division	8	0	0	0	—		1 (Note: Appearance(s) in Alan Turvey Trophy)	1	9	1
Billericay Town	2017–18	Isthmian League Premier Division	0	0	0	0	—		0	0	0	0
Billericay Town	Total		8	0	0	0	—		1	1	9	1
Leiston (loan)	2017–18	Isthmian League Premier Division	44	5	3	2	—		4 (Note: Three appearances in FA Trophy, one in Isthmian League Premier Division play-offs)	0	51	7
Dulwich Hamlet	2018–19	National League South	2	0	0	0	—		0	0	2	0
Leiston	2018–19	Southern League Premier Division Central	33	3	3	0	—		6 (Note: One appearance in Southern League Cup) (Note: Three appearances in FA Trophy) (Note: Two appearances in Suffolk Premier Cup)	2 (Note: One goal in FA Trophy) (Note: One goal in Suffolk Premier Cup)	42	6
Leiston	2019–20	Southern League Premier Division Central	23	2	0	0	—		1 (Note: One appearance in Suffolk Premier Cup)	0	24	2
Leiston	Total		56	5	3	0	—		7	2	66	8
Braintree Town (loan)	2019–20	National League South	2	0	0	0	—		1 (Note: One appearance in Essex Senior Cup)	0	2	0
Needham Market	2020–21	Southern League Premier Division Central	0	0	0	0	—		0	0	0	0
Career total			156	18	9	4	0	0	18	3	183	25
