= Jamie Harney =

Northern Irish footballer (born 1996)monster slong

Personal information
- Full name: Jamie Joseph Harney
- Date of birth: 4 March 1996 (age 30)
- Place of birth: Plumbridge, Northern Ireland
- Height: 1.83 m (6 ft 0 in)
- Position: Defender

Youth career
- Omagh United Youth
- 2010–2012: Maiden City Academy
- 2012–2014: West Ham United

Senior career*
Years	Team	Apps	(Gls)
2014–2015	West Ham United	0	(0)
2014–2015	→ Colchester United (loan)	1	(0)
2015–2016	Colchester United	4	(0)
2017–2022	Cliftonville	118	(6)

International career^{‡}
2012	Northern Ireland U16	5	(1)
2012–2013	Northern Ireland U17	11	(0)
2013–2014	Northern Ireland U19	9	(0)
2014	Northern Ireland U20	2	(0)
2014	Northern Ireland U21	1	(0)
- * Club domestic league appearances and goals as of 12:21 1 July 2022 (UTC) ‡ National team caps and goals as of 12:19, 1 July 2022 (UTC)

Jamie Joseph Harney (born 4 March 1996) is a Northern Irish professional football defender who last played for NIFL Premiership side Cliftonville.

After a two-year spell with Derry-based Maiden City Academy, Harney joined West Ham United. He continued his development with the club's Academy, featuring for the under-18 and under-21 sides. He joined Colchester United on a youth loan in November 2014, making his professional debut the same month. The deal was then made permanent in January 2015. He made five appearances before being released in September 2016. He joined Cliftonville in summer 2017.

Harney has represented Northern Ireland at youth level, receiving caps at under-16, under-17, under-19, under-20 and under-21 levels.

== Club career ==
=== West Ham United ===
Born in Plumbridge, Northern Ireland, after spending time with Omagh United Youth, Harney joined the Maiden City Academy based in Derry in August 2010, where he spent two years prior to signing for English Premier League side West Ham United in July 2012 as a first-year scholar. In his first season with the club, he amassed 17 under-18 appearances and scored two goals. He also made his under-21 debut the same season, featuring as a substitute at Norwich City on 17 October 2012. He scored his first West Ham goal in an FA Youth Cup third round victory over Aldershot Town on 10 December 2012, powering a header into the back of the net to give the Hammers a 2–0 lead.

In the 2013–14 season, Harney made a further 16 appearances for the under-18 side, scoring once, and made eight under-21 appearances, starting each game.

==== Colchester United loan ====
After teaming up with Colchester United's Academy and appearing in their Essex Senior Cup penalty shoot-out defeat to Concord Rangers on 28 October 2014, Harney joined the League One club on a youth loan deal until 12 January 2015. However, on 13 November, Colchester manager Tony Humes confirmed that Harney had agreed to a one-and-a-half-year permanent contract with the club.

Harney made his professional and Football League debut on 29 November 2014. He came on as a substitute for forward Rhys Healey in a tactical substitution following fellow loanee Will Packwood's red card for a foul in the penalty area. He arrived in the 72nd minute after Milton Keynes Dons had converted the penalty kick through Ben Reeves, when the score was 5–0. Ten-man Colchester eventually lost the game at Stadium mk 6–0. This was to be his only appearance of his loan spell.

=== Colchester United ===
On 28 January 2015, it was confirmed that Harney had joined Colchester United on a permanent basis, signing a one-and-a-half-year contract to keep him at the Colchester Community Stadium until the summer of 2016. He made what was his second debut for the club on 20 February 2016 when he replaced Darren Ambrose after 35-minutes of Colchester's 5–2 defeat to Bury after fellow defender Tom Eastman was sent off for a second bookable offence.

Harney made his first start for the club on 5 March 2016 during Colchester's 2–0 defeat by Port Vale at Vale Park. After making four League One appearances during the season, Harney was offered a new contract at the end of the campaign. He signed a new one-year deal on 6 July 2016.

His contract was terminated by mutual consent on 9 September 2016 after failing to break into John McGreal's squad in the 2016–17 campaign.

=== Cliftonville ===
In May 2017 it was announced that, following a break from the game, Harney had signed for NIFL Premiership club Cliftonville on a free transfer.

== International career ==
Harney has been capped by Northern Ireland at all age-group levels. He made five appearances and scored once at under-16 level. At under-17 level, he helped his side qualify for the elite round of the 2013 UEFA European Under-17 Championship, making eleven appearances in the age group. He captained the under-19 side to the 2014 Milk Cup Elite under-19 title after a 1–0 win over Canada on 1 August 2014. Harney made nine appearances at under-19 level for Northern Ireland, and two at under-20 level.

Harney was handed his under-21 debut by Jim Magilton on 9 September 2014 in their final 2015 UEFA European Under-21 Championship qualification match, in which they were defeated 4–1 at Shamrock Park.

== Career statistics ==
As of match played 11 November 2017

Appearances and goals by club, season and competition
Club	Season	League			National Cup		League Cup		Other		Total	
Club	Season	Division	Apps	Goals	Apps	Goals	Apps	Goals	Apps	Goals	Apps	Goals
West Ham United	2014–15	Premier League	0	0	0	0	0	0	–		0	0
Colchester United (loan)	2014–15	League One	1	0	–		–		–		1	0
Colchester United	2014–15	League One	0	0	–		–		–		0	0
Colchester United	2015–16	League One	4	0	0	0	0	0	0	0	4	0
Colchester United	2016–17	League Two	0	0	0	0	0	0	0	0	0	0
Colchester United	Total		4	0	0	0	0	0	0	0	4	0
Cliftonville	2017–18	NIFL Premiership	10	0	0	0	1	0	–		11	0
Career total			15	0	0	0	1	0	0	0	16	0

== Honours ==
Northern Ireland U19

- 2014 Milk Cup winner

Cliftonville

- Irish League Cup: 2021-22
