= Dan Holman =

English footballer

Personal information
- Full name: Daniel George Holman
- Date of birth: 5 June 1990 (age 36)
- Place of birth: Northampton, England
- Height: 1.81 m (5 ft 11 1/2 in)
- Position: Forward

Youth career
- 2001–2003: Northampton ON Chenecks
- 2003–2004: Long Buckby
- 2004: Moulton Magpies

Senior career*
Years	Team	Apps	(Gls)
–2009	Cogenhoe United		
2009–2010	Long Buckby	30	(20)
2010	Oxford City	2	(1)
2010–2011	Long Buckby	33	(25)
2011–2012	Histon	44	(28)
2012–2014	Braintree Town	69	(24)
2014–2016	Colchester United	4	(0)
2014	→ Wrexham (loan)	4	(0)
2014–2015	→ Aldershot Town (loan)	12	(3)
2015	→ Dover Athletic (loan)	6	(2)
2015–2016	→ Woking (loan)	26	(14)
2016–2018	Cheltenham Town	44	(18)
2017	→ Boreham Wood (loan)	13	(3)
2018	→ Leyton Orient (loan)	10	(0)
2018	Aldershot Town	13	(1)
2018–2019	Kettering Town	29	(11)
2019–2020	Brackley Town	15	(1)
2020–2021	Kettering Town	0	(0)
2021–2022	Torquay United	29	(3)
2022–2023	Northampton ON Chenecks	18	(20)
2023–	Barwell	6	(3)
- * Club domestic league appearances and goals as of 15:51, 23 January 2024 (UTC)

Daniel George Holman (born 5 June 1990) is an English professional footballer who plays as a forward for Barwell.

He began his career with a number of Northampton-based youth clubs, including Northampton ON Chenecks and Long Buckby. He featured for the first-team for Cogenhoe United, two spells with Long Buckby and briefly for Oxford City before joining Conference North side Histon in 2011. Holman earned a move to Conference Premier club Braintree Town in 2012, and his goalscoring form brought him to the attention of Football League teams, as he signed for Colchester United in 2014. He appeared for Wrexham, Aldershot Town, Dover Athletic and Woking on loan after failing to secure a place in Colchester's first-team. Following his successful loan spell with Woking, Holman joined Cheltenham Town. Holman re-joined former club Aldershot Town at the start of the 2018–19 season before making the switch to Kettering Town in November.

== Career ==
=== Early career ===
Born in Northampton, Holman's career began in the Northamptonshire local leagues, where he featured in the youth sides for Northampton ON Chenecks, Long Buckby, and Moulton Magpies. He featured in the first-team for United Counties League Premier Division side Cogenhoe United and later rejoined Long Buckby, where he had scored 60 goals in 77 appearances over two seasons. His second stint with Long Buckby was divided by a short spell with Oxford City in 2010. Having scored 30 league and cup goals in 35 appearances during the 2009–10 season with Long Buckby, Holman was signed by Southern League side Oxford City in the summer of 2010, After making his debut as a substitute on 28 August when City fell to a 2–1 defeat to Truro City, Holman scored his first and only goal after coming off the bench to grab an equaliser against Swindon Supermarine on 4 September. He played just one more game for City when he started in their 1–0 FA Cup first qualifying round defeat to Mangotsfield United on 11 September. He returned to Long Buckby, where he secured 26 goals in 37 outings during the remained of the 2010–11 season.

=== Histon ===
Histon boss David Livermore signed Holman from Long Buckby in July 2011 on a one-year contract. He made a goalscoring start to his Conference North career on 13 August 2011 in a 2–2 home draw with Blyth Spartans, opening the scoring in the 38th minute. He once again opened proceedings in his second match in the 4th minute during a 1–1 draw with Boston United at York Street on 16 August. Further goals followed against Worcester City on 23 August, a brace against Harrogate Town on 17 September, and single goals against Hinckley United, Vauxhall Motors, Workington and Solihull Moors to complete his scoring for 2011.

Holman continued his scoring form with a goal on New Year's Day 2012 in a 3–2 defeat to Bishop's Stortford at Bridge Road, with Holman netting a late consolation goal for the Stutes. He then grabbed seven goals in five games, scoring in each, beginning with two against Gloucester City in a 4–3 victory on 14 January 2012, one against Gainsborough Trinity, a further brace at home to Guiseley and single goals against Worcester and Corby Town.

Scoring two consecutive braces in one week against Droylsden on 10 March and Guiseley, Holman then embarked on another scoring run with five goals in four games, netting one goal in matches against Hinckley on 7 April, Gloucester on 9 April and Eastwood Town on 14 April, with a final brace for Histon coming in a 5–5 home draw with Droylsden on 17 April. He scored his final goal of the campaign in a 1–1 draw with Hyde on 28 April.

Following his superb form for Histon, it was arranged for Holman to join Barnet on trial but this never came to fruition. Bids from an unnamed Conference Premier club were also tabled for Holman but rejected by the club, despite the player receiving assurances from the club that he would be allowed to leave if higher level offers were received. Manager Dennis Greene said that the club would not be willing to sell the player unless the offer was right for the club. Holman duly scored in his first game of the new season for Histon on 18 August as they were defeated 4–1 at home to Guiseley, before playing his final game for the club on 21 August in a 6–0 thrashing by Boston. He ended his time with the club with 28 goals to his name in 44 league appearances.

=== Braintree Town ===
==== 2012–13 season ====
Conference Premier club Braintree Town signed Holman from Histon for an undisclosed fee on 26 August 2012. Having not yet trained with the club, Holman had a memorable debut for by scoring a long-range brace in a 4–1 win against Woking on 28 August. Holman then set himself a target to reach 20 goals for the season. He scored a match-winning penalty in a 2–1 win over Tamworth at Cressing Road in his next match, before making it four goals in three games for the Iron with a curling effort from 12 yards in a 1–1 draw with Kidderminster Harriers on 4 September. Holman believed that by joining Braintree he would be taking an important step towards his ambition of playing in the Football League.

Holman continued his scoring form with a driving shot from the edge of the box in Braintree's 3–2 defeat to Barrow on 6 October, before helping his side claim their first win in eight matches to overcome Luton Town on 9 October, opening the scoring with a curling shot into the top corner of the net. Manager Alan Devonshire described the result as "probably the best result in Braintree's history". He suffered a barren spell between mid-October and early January, where he scored with an early close range effort on 5 January 2013 in a 4–1 victory over Tamworth. His next goal handed the Iron the lead over Nuneaton Town after the half-time interval on 26 January as his side won 4–2. Holman put the Iron ahead after a goalless first half in a 3–1 away victory against Stockport County on 16 March after breaking through County's defensive line. After scoring in a 1–1 home draw with Woking on 19 March, Holman then suffered a knee injury that kept him out of first team action for almost one month. He scored his final goal of the season in his final game of the season on 20 April, grabbing the only goal of the game as Braintree beat Barrow at Holker Street, leaving Holman with a total of 11 goals in 34 league games in his first season with the club.

==== 2013–14 season ====
Holman had a slower start to the 2013–14 season that the previous season, scoring once in the opening five games of the campaign. That goal came against Woking on 13 August in a 2–0 win, firing home from a cross from six yards. A shoulder injury meant a spell on the sidelines for Holman, keeping him out of action for over a month. He returned in early October after missing all of September, but didn't register a goal until 12 November in a 2–1 home defeat for the Iron to Luton Town. He netted in a comprehensive FA Trophy second round victory over Welling United on 30 November, putting Braintree ahead after 18 minutes with a shot fired into the far corner. He then scored both goals in a 2–0 win away to Chester in his next game on 7 December, converting a free kick and scoring from outside the box. He next played on Boxing Day in a 1–0 defeat to Cambridge United but had to be substituted at half-time after experiencing a spasm in his back.

Holman's injury problems continued, meaning he played just once between late December and late February 2014. He made a goalscoring return on 22 February in a 2–2 draw with Kidderminster, netting at the near post to put Braintree 2–0 ahead in the 67th minute. He scored in his next four matches, netting the winner in a 2–1 win over Hyde, scoring the opener in a 1–1 home draw with Hereford United, doubling the Iron's advantage in a 3–0 win over Wrexham and a penalty in a 2–0 at the New Lawn against Forest Green Rovers on 13 March. After two consecutive 2–0 defeats to Lincoln City, Holman returned to scoring with the only goal against Aldershot Town on 22 March. He scored his twelfth goal of the season on 27 March against Nuneaton in a 2–1 victory with a left foot shot into the bottom corner of the net. He rounded off his scoring for the season with two against Southport on 1 April, scoring the second and fourth goals in a 4–0 win. He made his final appearance on 26 April in a stalemate at Cressing Road against Grimsby Town as a late substitute for Matt Paine.

With his contract expiring, Holman was offered a new deal to remain with Braintree in May 2014. Holman did not accept the offer of a new contract, but this did not rule out the possibility of him returning, with the player yet to find a new club. Holman joined Southend United on trial in July 2014, hoping to impress Shrimpers manager Phil Brown. However, on 7 July, it was announced that had travelled to their six-day training camp in Spain without Holman or any other trialists, with Holman expected to then sign for another Conference club. Holman had scored 24 league goals in 69 games for Braintree during his two seasons with the club.

=== Colchester United ===
Returning from his unsuccessful trial with Southend, Holman signed a two-year contract with League One club Colchester United on 8 July 2014 to bolster their attacking options. He scored in Colchester's opening pre-season 4–1 friendly win at Brantham Athletic on 12 July, and netted again in another 4–1 win at AFC Sudbury on 17 July. He hit his third goal of pre-season on 19 July, heading home a cross from Gavin Massey as the U's thrashed Leiston 8–1. Holman was withdrawn at half-time during a friendly defeat to Ipswich Town due to an ankle injury. He returned from injury in a behind-closed-doors friendly with Southend United on 5 August in his bid for fitness prior to the beginning of the 2014–15 season. He recovered in time to make his Football League debut on the opening day of the season as Colchester drew 2–2 with Oldham Athletic at the Community Stadium on 9 August. He came on as an 84th-minute substitute for Gavin Massey.

Having been utilised as a substitute in Colchester's defeats to Charlton Athletic in the League Cup and Bristol City in League One, Colchester manager Joe Dunne felt Holman needed more game time to mount a serious challenge for first-team contention. Holman played for the Colchester United under-21 squads in a bid to regain match fitness. With Tony Humes replacing Joe Dunne on 1 September, the new manager also looked for Holman to regain his sharpness by offering the player for loan. Holman had only featured four times in the league for the U's since arriving at the club, and failed to make Humes' squad for his first game in charge, missing out to Academy product Dominic Smith. Having missed part of pre-season with a foot injury, Holman's match fitness had lagged behind the rest of the squad, with Humes deciding that under-21 football wouldn't "stretch him to where he [Holman] wants to be".

==== Wrexham loan ====
Holman was sent out on loan to Conference Premier club Wrexham for one month on 19 September 2014 in order to regain match fitness. He made his debut for the Dragons in their 2–1 away defeat to Chester on 22 September as an 81st-minute substitute for Elliott Durrell. Since joining Wrexham however, Holman had only been used sparingly, making just four brief substitute appearances in his time with the club until 15 October. Wrexham manager Kevin Wilkin explained that while preferred attackers Louis Moult and Connor Jennings had been in good form, the club had not found themselves "in too many situations where I [Wilkin] have been comfortable to throw him on. He prefers to play facing the opposition goal whereas Louis and Connor play with their back to the opposition. They are the ones that want to come in and play a little bit shorter, play in pockets". Despite this, Holman featured for the club's reserve side, scoring in a 2–1 victory at Morecambe. Wilkin was also undecided whether to extend Holman's loan spell or not.

Holman returned to Colchester at the end of his loan spell as expected with only 31 minutes of football under his belt from his time with Wrexham. Despite this, Holman said the stint had made him more determined to be a success with the U's.

==== Aldershot Town loan ====
Following the disappointment of his Wrexham loan, Holman was sent back out on loan to another Conference club, Aldershot Town, on 24 October 2014. He was handed clearance by Colchester to play in the FA Cup, signing for one-month. He made his debut for the club on 25 October, starting in their 2–0 win over Torquay United in the fourth qualifying round of the FA Cup. Holman stabbed home a goal on his league debut for the club on 1 November in Aldershot's 2–1 home defeat to Gateshead, before netting his second goal in only his third appearance as he secured a 1–0 victory for his side against Nuneaton on 15 November.

Following his positive start to his time with Aldershot, Holman's loan spell was extended on 19 November with the deal due to run until 5 January 2015. He scored his third Conference goal of the season against his previous employers Wrexham on 29 November, opening the scoring with a shot outside of the box after cutting in from the right-hand side. However, he was withdrawn at half-time due to an injury. He ended his loan spell with three goals in 16 appearances in all competitions for Aldershot.

==== Dover Athletic loan ====
Holman joined his third loan club of the season on 2 February 2015, signing with Dover Athletic until the end of the season. He made his debut for Dover on 14 February, where he was introduced as a 72nd-minute substitute for Nicky Deverdics. He scored five minutes after coming on, netting the final goal and reducing the deficit in a 3–2 defeat to FC Halifax Town at The Shay. He was handed his first start on 21 February for Dover's home game with Southport. He scored in the 73rd minute of the 2–2 draw with a close-range finish. Holman had the ball in the back of the net when playing his previous loan club Aldershot on 3 March, only for it to be ruled offside. Following his good start to life with Dover, Holman admitted that he did not know what was going to happen with regards to remaining at Colchester in future, despite having a year remaining on his contract with the U's. Holman scored two goals in six games for Dover.

==== Woking loan ====
Still out of favour for the 2015–16 season, Holman was sent out on loan to Woking for a month's loan on 15 August 2015. He scored Woking's second goal on his debut as they defeated Altrincham 2–0, in addition to providing the assist for Giuseppe Sole's opener. In his third game for the club, Holman scored his second goal during the 5–2 home win over Chester as well as winning a penalty for the game's opening goal. After five appearances and two goals for Woking, Holman's loan was extended by Colchester until 2 January 2016 on 1 September. He scored his third goal for the club in their 4–4 away game with Guiseley on 12 September, putting his side 4–3 ahead before the home team snatched a stoppage time equaliser.

After five games without a goal, Holman scored a brace on 10 October as his side overcame Halifax 3–0 at The Shay. He then scored in his next game with a late equaliser against Torquay United on 13 October. Holman scored his seventh Woking goal during their 5–2 home defeat by Macclesfield Town on 14 November. He scored his fifth goal in seven games on 21 November to help his side to a 2–1 away win over Chester. He scored his ninth and tenth goals for Woking on 24 November in their 4–1 victory at home against Tranmere Rovers. Holman scored a further brace on 5 December during a 3–1 home win over Lincoln City. He scored another brace in his next league game on 19 December in a 5–1 away win over Gateshead.

=== Cheltenham Town ===
Holman's impressive form on loan at Woking, scoring 14 goals in 26 appearances, drew attention from other clubs, and he signed for National League leaders Cheltenham Town on 5 January 2016 on a six-month contract with a view to an extended deal in the summer.

On 24 January 2016, Holman made his Cheltenham Town debut in a 2–1 victory over his former club Dover Athletic, playing the full 90-minutes. He scored his first goal for the club six-days later with two against Bromley in a 4–1 win. After scoring goals in 2–0 victories over Welling United and Kidderminster, and another against Welling in a 1–1 draw, Holman scored all four goals in a 4–0 thrashing of his former club Woking on 12 March to bring his tally to nine goals in ten games for Cheltenham. He scored two further goals on 25 March against Boreham Wood, and then scored a late goal in a 2–0 win at Guiseley on 9 April before scoring twice against Halifax to bring him to 28 goals for the season and hand Cheltenham promotion back to the Football League on 16 April.

On 15 November 2016, after struggling with a toe injury for the first few months of the season, Holman scored Cheltenham's fourth in a 4–1 victory against Crewe Alexandra in the FA Cup first round.

==== Boreham Wood loan ====
On 22 September 2017, Holman joined National League side Boreham Wood on a three-month loan deal. A day later, Holman made his Boreham Wood debut during their 1–0 home defeat against Ebbsfleet United. Over a month later, he scored his first goal for the club in their 2–2 home draw against Bromley, netting the opener of the game in the 25th minute. After only managing to net four times in his three-month spell, including a goal in their FA Cup tie against Blackpool, Holman returned to Cheltenham in December 2017.

==== Leyton Orient loan ====
On 3 January 2018, following a loan spell with Boreham Wood, Holman opted to join fellow National League side Leyton Orient on loan for the remainder of the campaign. Just under a month later, he finally made his Orient debut during their 3–2 home defeat against Aldershot Town, playing the full 90 minutes. Holman went on to appear just nine more times for Orient, before leaving Cheltenham at the end of his contract in June 2018.

=== Return to Aldershot Town ===
Holman re-signed for his former club on 1 August 2018. He made his second debut for the club against Barnet on 4 August 2018. Holman's contract was mutually terminated on 31 October 2018 after just 1 goal in 14 appearances.

=== Kettering Town ===
On 5 November 2018, following his release from Aldershot, Holman made the switch to Southern League side, Kettering Town.

On 25 July 2020, Holman rejoined Kettering Town following his release from Brackley Town.

=== Torquay United ===
Following a successful pre-season trial with National League side Torquay United the club announced Holman would be joining the club on a one-year contract. Holman was released in May 2022 after one season with the club.

=== Further Non-League ===
In July 2022, Holman returned to Northampton ON Chenecks having represented the club during his youth career. He joined Barwell in August 2023.

== Career statistics ==
As of end of 2021–22 season

Appearances and goals by club, season and competition
Club	Season	League			FA Cup		League Cup		Other		Total	
Club	Season	Division	Apps	Goals	Apps	Goals	Apps	Goals	Apps	Goals	Apps	Goals
Histon	2011–12	Conference North	42	27	0	0	–		–		42	27
Histon	2012–13	Conference North	2	1	0	0	–		–		2	1
Histon	Total		44	28	0	0	–		–		44	28
Braintree Town	2012–13	Conference Premier	34	11	2	0	–		1 (Note: Appearances in FA Trophy)	0	37	11
Braintree Town	2013–14	Conference Premier	35	13	3	0	–		2	1	40	14
Braintree Town	Total		69	24	5	0	–		3	1	77	25
Colchester United	2014–15	League One	4	0	0	0	1	0	0	0	5	0
Colchester United	2015–16	League One	0	0	0	0	0	0	0	0	0	0
Colchester United	Total		4	0	0	0	1	0	0	0	5	0
Wrexham (loan)	2014–15	Conference Premier	4	0	–		–		–		4	0
Aldershot Town (loan)	2014–15	Conference Premier	12	3	4	0	–		–		16	3
Dover Athletic (loan)	2014–15	Conference Premier	6	2	–		–		–		6	2
Woking (loan)	2015–16	National League	26	14	1	0	–		1	0	28	14
Cheltenham Town	2015–16	National League	18	16	–		–		0	0	18	16
Cheltenham Town	2016–17	League Two	24	1	1	1	1	0	2 (Note: Appearance(s) in EFL Trophy)	0	28	2
Cheltenham Town	2017–18	League Two	2	1	0	0	2	0	1	0	5	1
Cheltenham Town	Total		44	18	1	1	3	0	3	0	51	19
Boreham Wood (loan)	2017–18	National League	13	3	3	1	–		2	0	18	4
Leyton Orient (loan)	2017–18	National League	10	0	–		–		–		10	0
Aldershot Town	2018–19	National League	13	1	1	0	–		0	0	14	1
Kettering Town	2018–19	Southern League Premier Division Central	0	0	–		–		0	0	0	0
Torquay United	2021–22	National League	29	3	2	0	—		1	0	32	3
Career total			274	96	17	2	4	0	10	1	305	99

== Honours ==
Cheltenham Town

- National League: 2015–16

Individual

- National League Player of the Year: 2015–16
- National League Team of the Year: 2015–16
