= Tom Eastman =

English footballer (born 1991)

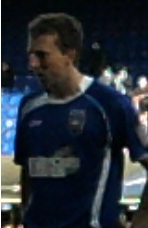
- Eastman playing for Ipswich Town in November 2010

Personal information
- Full name: Thomas Michael Eastman
- Date of birth: 21 October 1991 (age 35)
- Place of birth: Colchester, England
- Height: 6 ft 3 in (1.90 m)
- Position: Centre-back

Team information
- Current team: Maldon & Tiptree

Youth career
- 2000–2010: Ipswich Town

Senior career*
Years	Team	Apps	(Gls)
2010–2011	Ipswich Town	10	(0)
2011–2023	Colchester United	409	(23)
2011	→ Crawley Town (loan)	6	(0)
2023	→ Harrogate Town (loan)	21	(1)
2023–2025	Dagenham & Redbridge	59	(4)
2025–	Maldon & Tiptree	0	(0)
- * Club domestic league appearances and goals as of 14:10, 16 May 2025 (UTC)

Thomas Michael Eastman (born 21 October 1991) is an English professional footballer who plays as a centre-back for Isthmian League Premier Division club Maldon & Tiptree.

Eastman is a product of the Ipswich Town Academy, where he progressed through the ranks since the age of eight before making his first-team debut in 2010, a match in which he was sent off for a second bookable offence. After finding his chances with Ipswich limited, he moved to Colchester United in the summer of 2011. After making his Colchester debut in August 2011, he joined Crawley Town in an emergency loan deal in September 2011, where he made six appearances, before returning to the U's and establishing himself as a regular starter in the centre of defence. He has made over 300 league appearances for the Essex club. In 2020, he became the club's first player to be named Player of the Year on four occasions.

== Career ==
=== Ipswich Town ===
Born in Colchester, Essex, Eastman grew up in nearby Clacton, where he attended Clacton County High School. He grew up on the same street as former Ipswich Town and Leeds United footballer Ian Westlake, and followed in Westlake's footsteps by joining Ipswich's Academy in 2000 at the age of eight.

Eastman made his under-18s debut for Ipswich on 17 November 2007, coming on as a substitute in their 2–1 defeat at Southampton. At the age of 16, Eastman was offered a two-year apprenticeship with the club in February 2008. Shortly afterwards, he made his first appearance for the reserve team against Stevenage Borough in March 2008. His season ended with his solitary reserve appearance, alongside nine appearances for the under-18 team, and made a further 30 under-18 appearances in the 2008–09 season, and played eight reserve team matches.

==== 2009–10 season ====
In the 2009–10 season, manager Roy Keane said Eastman was "a good lad with a good attitude" and that he "had a chance" of having a career in football, while admitting that there was a possibility that he could feature for the first-team before the end of the season. He was an unused substitute for the Ipswich first-team matches against Nottingham Forest and Derby County in April 2010, before being offered a professional contract by the club.

Following his professional contract offer, Eastman was given Ipswich's 'Academy Player of the Year' award. Keane then handed Eastman his professional debut in the final match of the season on 2 May 2010 at Portman Road against Sheffield United. Eastman was sent off by referee Andy D'Urso after bookings from fouls on Nyron Nosworthy and Matthew Lowton just before the hour mark. Keane described the sending-off as "harsh". He also scored two goals in 23 reserve appearances, and three goals in 28 under-18 appearances during the season.

==== 2010–11 season ====
Eastman made his first professional start on 10 August 2010 in the League Cup, when Ipswich defeated Exeter City 3–2 after extra time Eastman took up the unfamiliar role of right-back in a number of matches early in the season. Roy Keane praised Eastman's performances at right-back, saying "he's three months out of the youth team, he's been brilliant for us and is going to have a great future ahead of him".

In April 2011, alongside teammates Jack Ainsley and Conor Hourihane, Eastman was offered a six-month contract, with his deal set to expire in the summer. Eastman ended the season with 12 appearances for the first team in all competitions, with one goal in 16 reserve appearances.

=== Colchester United ===
==== 2011–12 season ====
Eastman rejected the offer of a six-month contract from Ipswich and instead decided to join local rivals Colchester United on a two-year deal on 19 May 2011 on a free transfer. He made his debut for the club in the Football League Trophy on 30 August 2011, replacing Matt Heath with seven minutes remaining of their 3–1 home defeat to Barnet.

===== Crawley Town loan =====
On 13 September, Eastman signed for Crawley Town in an emergency one-month loan deal after an injury crisis struck the League Two club. He started his first match for Crawley the same day in their match against Swindon Town, playing the full 90 minutes of the 3–0 home defeat. After helping Crawley to a run of five successive wins and to the top of League Two, Eastman was recalled by Colchester. He returned to the U's following injuries to regular centre-backs Pat Baldwin and Matt Heath, and Magnus Okuonghae suspended.

===== Return to Colchester =====
Eastman went straight into the starting eleven for Colchester's League One trip to Hillsborough to face Sheffield Wednesday on 22 October, making his full and league debut for the U's in a 2–0 defeat. However, Eastman did not retain his place in the first-team, with the returning Magnus Okuonghae replacing him in the heart of the defence. His next appearance did not arrive until 19 November, when he was again drafted in to replace Okuonghae in the U's 5–1 home loss to Milton Keynes Dons.

On 2 January 2012, Eastman was handed only his third start in Colchester's 1–0 defeat at MK Dons, but a solid performance left him feeling "good" and aiming to "get more starts" under his belt. Manager John Ward then confirmed that Eastman would keep his place in the starting line-up on the back of his impressive performance and with Matt Heath still sidelined through injury. He scored his first professional goal on 9 April after heading in Anthony Wordsworth's corner kick in the second half of a 4–1 defeat to Bury.

Through 2012, Eastman held down a regular place in the Colchester first team, and towards the end of the season, he hoped that he could establish himself next season and prove that he could play "week in, week out". He won the Colchester United 'Young Player of the Year' and the Colchester United Supporters Association 'Away Player of the Year' awards for the 2011–12 season. Eastman ended the season with 33 appearances and three goals in all competitions for Colchester.

==== 2012–13 season ====
Eastman started his second season with Colchester partnering Magnus Okuonghae in the centre of defence in their season-opening League Cup 3–0 defeat to Yeovil Town on 14 August 2012. He scored his first goal of the campaign on 20 November when Colchester were defeated 3–1 at home to Coventry City, heading in Anthony Wordsworth's 71st minute free-kick. Having been consistently in the first team during the first half of the season, Eastman signed a contract extension until the summer of 2015 on 31 January 2013. He set himself the target of continuing to hold down a regular starting position in Joe Dunne's squad, despite strong competition for places in the team. He found himself out of action across January and February, failing to start a match, with boss Dunne handing Eastman a new fitness regime. Once again, Eastman was ruled out in mid-March for one month with an ankle injury.

On the final day of the 2012–13 season, Eastman scored his second goal of the season in a crucial win against Carlisle United, a victory that kept Colchester in League One. He made a total of 32 first-team appearances across the season.

==== 2013–14 season ====
The 2013–14 season began with Eastman once again partnering Okuonghae in defence for their season-opening 1–0 League One with at Gillingham on 3 August 2013. Eastman was ruled out by injury ahead of Colchester's 1–1 draw with his previous loan club Crawley on 21 September, with his ankle injury ruling him out until early November. He made his comeback for the Development Squad for a friendly against Watford.

After helping Colchester again avoid relegation, Eastman was named as the club's Player of the Year at the annual end of season awards dinner in May 2014. In addition to this award, he also scooped the "Players' Player of the Year" accolade. He made 39 first-team appearances despite sitting a number of matches out with injury.

==== 2014–15 season ====
Lining up alongside Okuonghae for his fourth season with the U's, Eastman featured in Colchester's 2–2 opening day home draw with Oldham Athletic on 9 August 2014. He racked up his 100th appearance for Colchester on 12 August in their 4–0 League Cup defeat to Charlton Athletic. Eastman signed a new contract with the club on 16 October to see him through to the summer of 2016. Eastman's performances throughout January 2015 earned him a nomination for the League One "Player of the Month" award, alongside Dele Alli, Andy Butler and Tom Hopper, with manager Tony Humes saying that it was a "great accolade for him [Eastman] that he's been nominated". Eastman was an ever-present member of the squad throughout the season, having played every league and cup match. He achieved this by playing alongside 12 different central defence partners following Magnus Okuonghae's season-ending injury, including Okuonghae, Frankie Kent, Karleigh Osborne, Bongani Khumalo, Kaspars Gorkšs, Alex Wynter, Will Packwood, Jamie Harney, Alex Gilbey, David Wright, Cole Kpekawa and Sean Clohessy.

Eastman scored his first goal of the season on 18 April in Colchester's home match against Scunthorpe United. His goal in the 81st minute levelled the scores at 1–1, in a match which eventually ended 2–2. After ending the season having played every minute of every match during the campaign, Eastman was awarded the Colchester United 'Player of the Year' for the second successive season in May 2015, as well as claiming the Colchester United Supporters Association 'Home Player of the Year' and 'Away Player of the Year' awards.

==== 2015–16 season ====
In his 13th appearance of the 2015–16 season, Eastman scored his first goal of the campaign to double the U's lead before half-time against Shrewsbury Town on 10 October 2015. However, after a poor second-half display where his side conceded four goals, they lost 4–2.

Eastman was involved in a sickening clash of heads with fellow Colchester defender Alex Wynter on 30 January in the U's FA Cup fourth round defeat by Tottenham Hotspur. After just two-minutes of play, the two collided, leaving Wynter unconscious and suffering a seizure on the field, and Eastman drawing blood and requiring treatment off the pitch. He returned to play, but was substituted for Matthew Briggs after 21-minutes.

He received his first red card for Colchester on 20 February when he was dismissed for a second bookable offence in their 5–2 defeat to Bury.

After making 48 appearances in the 2015–16 campaign, Eastman was offered a new contract at the end of the season. He signed a new one-year deal ahead of the 2016–17 season.

==== 2016–17 season ====
Eastman made a goalscoring return to action in the 2016–17 season when he scored Colchester's goal in their 1–1 opening day draw with Hartlepool United at Victoria Park. He scored his second on 22 November with the third goal in the U's 3–0 win at Cheltenham Town, a performance which earned him a place in the EFL 'Team of Midweek'.

Following an injury sustained during Colchester's 1–1 draw with Blackpool on 4 February 2017, it was reported that Eastman would be ruled out of action for the remainder of the season after requiring an operation on ruptured ankle ligaments. However, he returned to training in mid-March, and then started in Colchester's 2–1 victory at home to Luton Town on 25 March. He completed the campaign with three goals in 38 matches.

==== 2017–18 season ====
Ahead of the 2017–18 season, Eastman signed a two-year contract extension with the club. He scored his first goal of the season on 28 October in Colchester's 3–1 win over Crewe Alexandra. At the end of the season, he was named Player of the Year for the third time, equalling Mike Walker's club record and becoming the first outfield player to achieve the accolade.

==== 2018–19 season ====
Eastman scored his first goal of the 2018–19 season on 2 October with the opening goal in Colchester's 3–1 win over Yeovil Town. He signed a two-year contract extension with Colchester in June 2019.

==== 2019–20 season ====
Eastman was named Colchester United's Player of the Year for a fourth time, surpassing Mike Walker's record of three awards. He also collected the Players' Player of the Year award as well as the Supporters Association Home and Away Player of the Year awards. He made 47 appearances scoring three goals across the season as the U's faltered in the League Two play-offs.

==== 2020–21 season ====
After making scoring two goals in 49 appearances in the 2020–21 season, on 25 May 2021 Eastman signed a new two-year contract with the club having already registered 411 games for the U's since joining in 2011.

==== Harrogate Town (loan) ====
On 26 January 2023, Eastman joined fellow League Two side Harrogate Town on loan until the end of the season. He made his debut in a 1–0 loss to Sutton United.

=== Dagenham & Redbridge F.C. ===
Released by Colchester United upon expiration of his latest contract in the summer of 2023, Eastman had a permanent offer from Harrogate Town but turned it down, citing a desire to remain close to his home in Essex. He instead signed for National League side Dagenham & Redbridge on a two-year deal.

=== Maldon & Tiptree ===
On 16 May 2025, Eastman joined Isthmian League North Division side Maldon & Tiptree.

== Career statistics ==
As of match played 4 March 2025

Appearances and goals by club, season and competition
Club	Season	League			FA Cup		League Cup		Other		Total	
Club	Season	Division	Apps	Goals	Apps	Goals	Apps	Goals	Apps	Goals	Apps	Goals
Ipswich Town	2009–10	Championship	1	0	0	0	0	0	—		1	0
Ipswich Town	2010–11	Championship	9	0	0	0	3	0	—		12	0
Ipswich Town	Total		10	0	0	0	3	0	—		13	0
Colchester United	2011–12	League One	25	3	1	0	0	0	1 (Note: Appearance in Football League Trophy)	0	27	3
Colchester United	2012–13	League One	29	2	1	0	1	0	1	0	32	2
Colchester United	2013–14	League One	36	0	1	0	1	0	1	0	39	0
Colchester United	2014–15	League One	46	1	3	0	1	0	1	0	51	1
Colchester United	2015–16	League One	43	2	4	0	1	0	0	0	48	2
Colchester United	2016–17	League Two	35	3	1	0	0	0	2 (Note: Appearance(s) in EFL Trophy)	0	38	3
Colchester United	2017–18	League Two	42	3	1	0	0	0	2	0	45	3
Colchester United	2018–19	League Two	31	3	1	0	1	0	2	0	35	3
Colchester United	2019–20	League Two	36	2	1	0	5	1	5 (Note: Three appearances in EFL Trophy, two appearances in EFL League Two play-offs)	0	47	3
Colchester United	2020–21	League Two	45	2	1	0	1	0	2	0	49	2
Colchester United	2021–22	League Two	28	1	1	0	1	0	4	0	34	1
Colchester United	2022–23	League Two	13	1	1	0	2	0	3	1	19	2
Colchester United	Total		409	23	17	0	14	1	24	1	464	25
Crawley Town (loan)	2011–12	League Two	6	0	—		—		—		6	0
Harrogate Town (loan)	2022–23	League Two	21	1	—		—		—		21	1
Dagenham & Redbridge	2023–24	National League	33	4	1	0	—		1 (Note: Appearance(s) in FA Trophy)	0	35	4
Dagenham & Redbridge	2024–25	National League	26	0	3	0	—		1 (Note: Appearance(s) in National League Cup)	0	30	0
Dagenham & Redbridge	Total		59	4	4	0	—		2	0	65	4
Career total			505	28	21	0	17	1	26	1	569	30

== Honours ==
Individual

- Ipswich Town Young Player of the Year: 2009–10
- Colchester United Young Player of the Year: 2011–12
- Colchester United Player of the Year: 2013–14, 2014–15, 2017–18, 2019–20
