= 2014–15 Colchester United F.C. season =

Colchester United
2014–15 season
- Owner: Robbie Cowling
- Chairman: Robbie Cowling
- Manager: Joe Dunne (until 1 September); Tony Humes (from 1 September)
- Stadium: Colchester Community Stadium
- League One: 19th
- FA Cup: 3rd round (eliminated by Cardiff City)
- League Cup: 1st round (eliminated by Charlton Athletic)
- Football League Trophy: 2nd round (southern section) (eliminated by Gillingham)
- Top goalscorer: League: Freddie Sears (10); All: Freddie Sears (14)
- Highest home attendance: 8,413 v Preston North End, 3 May 2015
- Lowest home attendance: 1,401 v Gillingham, 7 October 2014
- Average home league attendance: 3,704
- Biggest win: 3–0 v Crewe Alexandra, 27 September 2014; 6–3 v Gosport Borough, 9 November 2014
- Biggest defeat: 0–6 v Milton Keynes Dons, 29 November 2014 v Chesterfield, 14 April 2015
Home colours	Away colours

The 2014–15 season was Colchester United's 73rd season in their history and seventh successive season in the third tier of English football, League One. Alongside competing in the League One, the club also participated in the FA Cup, the League Cup and the Football League Trophy.

A string of four consecutive defeats meant Joe Dunne lost his job and Tony Humes was appointed his replacement. Colchester had an upturn in league form and leapt to mid-table, but soon a string of poor results mean the U's spent much of the campaign in the relegation zone. Aside from after a home win over Bristol Rovers in February, United were in the bottom four from late November until the final day of the season, when results went in their favour and they beat Preston North End to secure League One survival by the narrowest of margins.

For the fourth successive year, Colchester failed to reach the second round of the League Cup following defeat by Charlton Athletic, and despite a bye to the second round of the Football League Trophy, Gillingham won 4–2 on penalties at the Colchester Community Stadium. Colchester did reach the third round of the FA Cup, featuring in two televised matches. Cardiff City comfortably beat the U's 3–1 following a first round win at Gosport Borough and a second round victory at home to Peterborough United.

== Season overview ==
=== Pre-season ===
Days after the final game of the 2013–14 season, Joe Dunne began making changes to his playing squad. Club stalwart Karl Duguid announced his retirement after playing in the final game of the season, while Clinton Morrison's impending exit was announced prior to the last match.

In the midst of financial cutbacks, the club were unable to offer competitive terms to club captain Brian Wilson, who departed in search of a new club. Also leaving were Academy graduates Jordan Sanderson and Shaun Phillips, while Ryan Dickson was offered new terms after his one-year deal expired.

Colchester made their first signing of the campaign on 14 May as young striker Dominic Smith signed following his release from Crewe Alexandra. He had been on trial with the under-23 side during the latter stages of the 2013–14 season.

On 22 May, Dominic Vose signed a contract extension until summer 2016, while Ryan Dickson decided against a new deal at the club and opted to join League One rivals Crawley Town.

Long-serving goalkeeper Mark Cousins decided to end his ten-year association with the club to instead sign for Dagenham & Redbridge on 23 June.

On 1 July, Colchester brought in a trio of new players to fill the void left by the departing Cousins, Dickson, and Wilson. Former Southend United and Gillingham right-back Sean Clohessy joined the club on a two-year deal, Ben Gordon signed on a free transfer from Ross County, and former Dagenham & Redbridge goalkeeper Chris Lewington also signed a two-tear contract.

Josh Thompson and David Wright signed new one-year deals on 3 July, and on 8 July, Colchester signed former Braintree Town striker Dan Holman on a two-year deal.

Colchester played their first game of pre-season on 12 July against Brantham Athletic. The U's won 4–1 with goals from Dominic Vose, Jabo Ibehre, Freddie Sears and Dan Holman. Three days later they played Heybridge Swifts as triallist George Moncur, David Wright, and a brace from Sears gave them a 4–0 half-time lead. In the second-half, they continued the scoring with goals registered by Gavin Massey, Vose and an Ibehre brace sealed an 8–0 win. They then put four past AFC Sudbury on 17 July with Sears, Drey Wright, Sammie Szmodics and Holman the scorers.

Freddie Sears continued his goalscoring for on 19 July as Colchester won 8–1 at Leiston. He scored four, while Holman, Massey, Szmodics and Drey Wright scored the rest.

On 23 July, Colchester played their first home friendly of pre-season against neighbours Ipswich Town. Town scored twice in the first twelve minutes of the second-half through Frank Nouble while Jack Marriott added a third later on for the visitors.

Colchester were held to a 2–2 draw at Dover Athletic on 25 July, Josh Thompson and Sammie Szmodics the scorers, before a 4–3 victory over Dagenham Redbridge on 26 July. Macauley Bonne scored his first goal of pre-season, but the U's found themselves 3–1 down at the hour mark. Five minutes later, they began their fight back, as Vose scored once and then scored the equaliser on 76-minutes. Jabo Ibehre scored the U's winner two minutes later.

On 29 July, Colchester faced Luton Town, where they were held to a 2–2 draw following a Paul Connolly own goal and a Jabo Ibehre goal.

The club's final pre-season friendly was a 2–0 defeat at Conference South side Bishop's Stortford on 30 July.

On 7 August, after training with the club throughout pre-season, George Moncur signed for the club on loan from West Ham United until 11 January 2015. The same day, following the departure of Brian Wilson, Magnus Okuonghae was appointed club captain, with Sean Clohessy named vice-captain.

=== August ===
Colchester faced Oldham Athletic in the opening game of the season on 9 August. The U's scored first after seven minutes through Magnus Okuonghae, but Oldham equalised through Jonathan Forte on 18-minutes, before he gave them the lead in the 40th-minute. Making his debut from the bench, George Moncur levelled the game again on 58-minutes to draw the match 2–2.

Colchester had been drawn against Championship opposition in the first round of the League Cup as they travelled to Charlton Athletic on 12 August. The side once again failed to reach the second round as they suffered a 4–0 defeat. Magnus Okuonghae also found himself sent off for deliberate handball in the penalty area, from which Charlton converted.

On 16 August, Colchester travelled to Ashton Gate Stadium to play Bristol City. George Moncur scored his second goal in as many league games after nine minutes, but City equalised immediately after half-time through Aaron Wilbraham. He scored his second in the 68th-minute to hand the hosts a 2–1 win.

Notts County beat Colchester 2–1 at Meadow Lane on 19 August. They conceded after six minutes when Ronan Murray scored. Freddie Sears equalised on 69-minutes, but Liam Noble scored shortly afterwards with a shot from outside of the box.

Colchester's winless run continued on 23 August as they were defeated 1–0 at home by Doncaster Rovers. They then suffered another home defeat as Peterborough United won 3–1 at the Colchester Community Stadium. Peterborough took a two goal lead before half-time, but Freddie Sears pulled one back on 64-minutes. However, Jermaine Anderson scored 13-minutes from time to seal the victory.

=== September ===
Following the club's winless start to the season, manager Joe Dunne left the club by mutual consent on 1 September. Chairman Robbie Cowling acted quickly to replace Dunne by promoting Tony Humes to position of first-team manager, having previously overseen youth development at the club and had guided the under-18 side to a league and cup double in the 2013–14 season.

On 2 September, Humes made his first signing as he brought in youngster Byron Lawrence from Ipswich Town on a one-year deal.

In Humes' first match in charge on 6 September, he took his Colchester side to face Walsall. He handed Dominic Smith his professional debut when he was sent on as a second-half substitute for Gavin Massey, but the U's were unable to break the deadlock in a 0–0 draw, their first clean sheet of the season.

Colchester claimed their first victory of the campaign on 13 September at Leyton Orient. They were down to ten men just before the break when Magnus Okuonghae received his second red card of the season. Despite this, Colchester took the lead through Sanchez Watt on 62-minutes. On 73-minutes, Freddie Sears doubled the U's lead to hand Humes his first win as manager.

On 16 September, Colchester hosted Sheffield United. George Moncur scored his third goal of the season on 31-minutes, and in the second-half Freddie Sears doubled the hosts lead with 13-minutes remaining. However, the Blades commenced on a comeback when Ben Davies scored on 83-minutes, before Ryan Flynn levelled the score two minutes later. In the 88th-minute, Sheffield completed a six-minute salvo when Davies converted a penalty after Alex Gilbey had fouled Stefan Scougall in the area.

On 19 September, Dan Holman joined Conference National side Wrexham on loan for one-month, while Cardiff City forward Rhys Healey arrived on a loan deal that would run until 20 December. Meanwhile, development squad striker Nnamdi Nwachuku made a loan move to Leiston.

Colchester were held to a 0–0 home draw by Bradford City on 20 September.

Kane Vincent-Young signed a one-year deal following a trial with the under-21 side on 23 September.

Colchester moved out of the relegation zone on 27 September following a 3–0 win at bottom club Crewe Alexandra. Freddie Sears scored his fifth goal of the season on 57-minutes. New recruit Rhys Healey was brought on as a substitute for Craig Eastmond and duly scored shortly after his arrival on the pitch. Sanchez Watt completed the scoring for the visitors on 67-minutes.

=== October ===
Rhys Healey scored on his first start for the club after 16-minutes of Colchester's game at Preston North End on 3 October. However, Preston equalised four minutes later before taking the lead four minutes after that. Alex Gilbey scored his first goal of the season to level the scored on 37-minutes. Preston retook the lead shortly after half-time before Chris Humphrey sealed a 4–2 victory on 57-minutes.

On 6 October, Colchester made another loan signing with Ipswich Town right-back Elliott Hewitt joining for one month, while David Fox signed a short-term deal after training with the club.

Having received a bye in the first round, Colchester crashed out of the Football League Trophy on penalties following a 3–3 draw with Gillingham on 7 October. Drey Wright scored his first goal of the season to open the scoring on 17-minutes, but Brennan Dickenson later equalised. Sanchez Watt made it 2–1 from the penalty spot after Rhys Healey had been fouled in the area, but Bradley Dack allowed the visitors to equalise once again. They then took the lead with 16-minutes remaining when Antonio German scored. Freddie Sears scored a late equaliser, meaning the match went to a penalty shoot-out. George Moncur and Tom Eastman missed their penalties for Colchester as Gillingham won 4–2.

Having not featured under Tony Humes, Jabo Ibehre was allowed to leave the club on loan to Oldham on 9 October. The same day, youth team graduate Sammie Szmodics signed a 3 1/2-year contract extension with the club.

On 11 October, Colchester came from behind to beat Fleetwood Town 2–1 courtesy of a Gavin Massey brace.

After scoring a brace in his previous game, Massey, alongside defenders Tom Eastman and Frankie Kent, all signed contract extensions with the club on 16 October. Eastman agreed a deal until 2016, Massey until 2017, and Kent until 2018.

On 18 October, Colchester were held to a 1–1 draw by Scunthorpe United at Glanford Park, Freddie Sears with the U's goal.

On 21 October, Colchester hosted Chesterfield. The visitors scored in controversial fashion with less than a minute on the clock after Frankie Kent had been floored by a powerful strike in the face. Referee Darren Sheldrake allowed play to continue as Sam Clucas scored. At half-time Rhys Healey replaced George Moncur and scored within five minutes of his arrival. Four minutes from the full-time whistle, Freddie Sears scored once again to earn all three points for Colchester.

Dan Holman was loaned out once again on 24 October, on this occasion to Aldershot Town for one month. Joining him in leaving the club on loan was Josh Thompson, yet to appear this season. He joined League Two's bottom club Tranmere Rovers on loan until January.

Colchester earned a 2–2 draw at Swindon Town on 25 October. Former U's loanee Michael Smith had given his side the lead in the first-half, but Rhys Healey levelled after the break. Smith then scored once more only for Gavin Massey to score an equaliser shortly afterwards.

=== November ===
On 1 November, Port Vale won 2–1 at the Community Stadium, Freddie Sears with the consolation goal for Colchester.

On 4 November, prior to the U's FA Cup first round tie on 9 November, Humes bolstered his forward line with the acquisition of Kemar Roofe on loan from West Bromwich Albion for one month.

In the first round of the FA Cup, Colchester were drawn against Conference South outfit Gosport Borough who were featuring in the first round of the Cup for the first time in their 70-year history. Gavin Massey opened the scoring for the visitors after 14-minutes, and Sanchez Watt doubled the lead seven minutes later. Sears scored Colchester's third of the match on 26-minutes from the penalty spot. Justin Bennett pulled a goal back for the hosts on 39-minutes, but Alex Gilbey put the U's firmly back in front prior to half-time. Gosport once again reduced the deficit to 4–2 as Bennett scored his second of the game, before Sears scored his second of the game on 78-minutes. Both teams scored in stoppage time as Sammie Szmodics registered his first professional goal, before Lee Wort finalised the 6–3 result.

Following the FA Cup game, Humes brought in defender Jamie Harney on loan from West Ham for two months on 12 November, while Ipswich defender Elliott Hewitt returned to the club for a further month-long loan spell on 13 November.

Academy product Michael O'Donoghue was handed his professional debut on 14 November against Barnsley in an unfamiliar defence following injuries to Magnus Okuonghae and Frankie Kent. Barnsley took the lead after just four minutes, but Sanchez Watt equalised on 15-minutes. Sean Clohessy fouled Devante Cole in the penalty area and Conor Hourihane converted. Barnsley then scored their third through Peter Ramage but Freddie Sears scored his twelfth goal of the season in a 3–2 win for Barnsley.

On 18 November it was announced George Moncur had signed a permanent contract with the club until summer 2017. The defence was also bolstered by the loan signing of Queens Park Rangers youngster Cole Kpekawa joining in an initial month-long deal.

On 21 November, Marcus Bean, who had not featured under Humes, was loaned out by the club to League Two side Portsmouth until early January with a view to a permanent move. Meanwhile, development squad player Billy Roast joined Isthmian League Premier Division outfit AFC Hornchurch on loan until 20 December.

On 22 November, Colchester hosted Coventry City, who consigned the U's to their third consecutive league defeat with a 1–0 victory, in a match that saw Magnus Okuonghae ruled out for the rest of the season with a ruptured achilles tendon. With this news, Humes made another loan signing of Birmingham City's Will Packwood until 1 January.

On 26 November, experienced defender David Wright left the club by mutual consent following a series of niggling injuries and having made only three substitute appearances this season.

A makeshift defence lined-up at Milton Keynes Dons on 29 November as Elliott Hewitt, Cole Kpekawa and debutant Will Packwood started alongside Tom Eastman, the only contracted Colchester played in the back four. Dele Alli scored after four minutes before Benik Afobe doubled the home side's lead on 37-minutes, and then scored his second on the stroke of half-time. He completed his hat-trick on 58-minutes, before Packwood was sent off on his debut after fouling Afobe in the penalty area. Ben Reeves converted to make it 5–0 as Humes brought on Jamie Harney for his professional debut. Lee Hodson then completed the scoring to make it 6–0.

=== December ===
Dominic Vose left the club by mutual consent on 2 December having failed to attract interest for a loan move away, while Kemar Roofe returned to his parent club after amassing 35 minutes of playing time during his loan spell.

Prior to Colchester's FA Cup second round fixture against Peterborough United, the club brought in experienced Latvia international defender Kaspars Gorkšs on a short-term contract.

Having reached the second round of the FA Cup for the first time since 2011, Colchester faced Peterborough at home. Kaspars Gorkšs was placed straight into the first-team squad. Sanchez Watt fouled Michael Bostwick in the penalty area but Sam Walker saved the resulting penalty from Aaron McLean two minutes from full-time. Colchester countered from this and George Moncur scored in the first minute of stoppage time to seal a 1–0 win for the U's.

Following the cup triumph, Will Packwood returned to Birmingham on 11 December following a groin injury. On 12 December, Sam Walker extended his contract with the club for a further year until summer 2016.

On 13 December, Colchester suffered another heavy league defeat when Rochdale won 4–1 at the Community Stadium. Gavin Massey scored the only goal for the U's.

Worsening Colchester's injury woes was Michael O'Donoghue who only shortly after making his first-team bow was ruled out for nine months after rupturing his cruciate ligaments in training on 16 December. Three loanees then extended their stays with the club as Rhys Healey signed on until the end of the season, while Elliott Hewitt and Cole Kpekawa both agreed to a further month.

Colchester ended a run of five successive defeats on 20 December with a 1–0 win over Yeovil Town at Huish Park with Craig Eastmond's first goal of the season.

In the Boxing Day fixture against Gillingham, Colchester were defeated 2–1 at home with Sammie Szmodics scoring the U's goal.

A goalless draw away at Crawley Town on 28 December rounded off the year with Colchester still two points away from safety in the relegation zone.

=== January ===
Colchester had been drawn away to Championship side Cardiff City in the third round of the FA Cup on 2 January. The game, televised on BBC Two Wales took place in front of a sparse crowd of just 4,194, the lowest ever attendance at the Cardiff City Stadium in protest of the club's ownership. Cardiff had a 3–0 lead after an hour, but Freddie Sears scored a consolation for Colchester to bring his tally for the season to 13 goals. Both Tom Lapslie and Dion Sembie-Ferris were sent on as substitutes to make their professional debuts in the game.

Dominic Smith joined Billy Roast at AFC Hornchurch in a one-month loan deal, while David Fox agreed an extension to his short-term contract until the end of the season. Marcus Bean returned from his Portsmouth loan, but the club cancelled his contract by mutual consent the same day before signing for Wycombe Wanderers. Kaspars Gorkšs signed a short-term contract with the club, while former loanee Alex Wynter joined on an 18-month contract from Crystal Palace.

January's league fixtures began on 10 January with an away win at Peterborough United. Freddie Sears struck his tenth league goal of the season before Elliott Hewitt sealed a 2–0 victory with his first professional goal.

With his contract set to expire in the summer, top-scorer Freddie Sears made a move to Championship side Ipswich Town for an undisclosed fee on 16 January.

On 17 January, Colchester lost 2–0 to Walsall in their fifth successive home defeat.

Following Sears' move to Ipswich, Colchester and Ipswich confirmed the loan move of Jack Marriott until the end of the season, while Elliott Hewitt extended his stay for a further month.

On 22 January, Colchester confirmed the signings of two further players with the arrival of Chris Porter from Sheffield United on an 18-month contract, and Millwall defender Matthew Briggs on loan until the end of the season.

Porter and Briggs were handed their debuts on 24 January in a relegation battle with Leyton Orient, while Tom Lapslie was granted his first start and home debut. Gavin Massey opened the scoring on 14-minutes and Kaspars Gorkšs doubled the lead with his first goal for the club shortly after half-time. Elliott Hewitt was sent off for a professional foul with six minutes remaining but Colchester held on for their third home win of the season.

On 26 January, development squad players Nnamdi Nwachuku and Billy Roast both had their contracts cancelled by mutual consent. Josh Thompson then also had his contract terminated as he joined Tranmere permanently on 28 January. Jamie Harney agreed a permanent deal with the club until summer 2016, while Kaspar Gorkšs' short-term deal expired and he joined Super League Greece side Ergotelis. Colchester signed Tottenham Hotspur youth product Kenny McEvoy on loan until the end of the season on 30 January.

Chris Porter scored his first goal for the club on 31 January in Colchester's 1–1 draw with Bradford City at Valley Parade.

=== February ===
Transfer deadline day fell on 2 February as two more players left the club. Having fallen out of favour under Tony Humes and with six months remaining on his contract, Craig Eastmond left the club by mutual consent. Dan Holman left to join Dover Athletic on loan until the end of the season.

On 7 February, Colchester faced Crewe at the Community Stadium. Chris Porter scored his second goal in three games for the U's to give the home side a 1–0 advantage at the interval. However, three goals for the visitors without reply in the second-half gave Crewe victory, while Jack Marriott pulled one back for the U's three minutes after arriving on the pitch as a substitute.

Another defeat followed on 10 February as Sheffield United beat the U's 4–1 at Bramall Lane, Sammie Szmodics with Colchester's consolation goal.

On 14 February, Szmodics scored in his second successive game to hand the U's a 1–0 win over Oldham.

On 17 February, Colchester hosted Milton Keynes Dons, who won 1–0 through a Dele Alli goal.

Colchester hosted League One leaders Bristol City on 21 February and took the lead after just three minutes when Tom Lapslie headed in his first professional goal. Eleven minutes later, Macauley Bonne scored his first goal of the season to double the lead. Chris Porter then made it 3–0 after 26-minutes. City pulled a goal back on 50-minutes, and Aden Flint scored on 61-minutes to make it 3–2, but the U's held on for a vital win to move them out of the relegation zone for the first time since November.

Following his goal in the previous match, Macauley Bonne was handed a 2 1/2-year contract extension with his original deal expiring in the summer. On 26 February, Bristol City allowed Karleigh Osborne to join the U's on loan until the end of the season.

Colchester suffered a 2–0 defeat at Doncaster Rovers on 28 February, dropping them back into the relegation zone.

=== March ===
Colchester lost 1–0 at home to Notts County on 3 March.

Still refusing to play under Tony Humes, Jabo Ibehre was loaned out to League One rivals Barnsley on 6 March until the end of the season.

On 7 March, Colchester suffered a 2–1 defeat at Rochdale, with Chris Porter scoring a penalty for the visitors.

Colchester were leapfrogged by relegation rivals Crawley Town on 14 March after suffering their twelfth home defeat of the campaign. Sammie Szmodics had given the U's the lead after 11-minutes, but former U's player Ryan Dickson equalised on 15-minutes. Crawley took the lead before half-time, but David Fox's first goal of his second spell with the club from a free kick levelled the score. Former Colchester loanee Izale McLeod scored the winner for Crawley from the penalty spot after being brought down by Sam Walker. The game featured newly signed Norwich City loanee Jacob Murphy, while South Africa captain Bongani Khumalo signed from Tottenham on loan until the end of the season but did not receive international clearance in time to face Crawley. Fellow Spurs player Kenny McEvoy returned to White Hart Lane after making just one substitute appearance for Colchester.

Colchester hosted League One's bottom club Yeovil Town on 17 March. The U's won 2–0 through a David Fox penalty and a Jacob Murphy goal. Having started in the game, Rhys Healey was recalled from his season long loan by Cardiff on 19 March. Meanwhile, young midfielder Conor Hubble was released by the club.

On 21 March, Colchester drew 2–2 with Gillingham. George Moncur broke the deadlock on 62-minutes, but Max Ehmer levelled eight-minutes from full-time. Chris Porter scored five minutes later to put the U's back in front, but after four minutes of stoppage time, Matthew Briggs was sent off for a second bookable offence, after which Gillingham scored a late equaliser through Doug Loft.

Ipswich recalled Elliott Hewitt from his loan with the club on 26 March. To replace the departing Hewitt, Humes drafted in further defensive cover, signing Rotherham United's right-back Richard Brindley on loan until the end of the season.

=== April ===
On 2 April, Rhys Healey rejoined Colchester from Cardiff on loan until the end of the season.

Colchester battled to an important 2–1 win over Port Vale on 3 April courtesy of George Moncur and Jacob Murphy goals. Despite the victory, Colchester remained four points from safety with seven games remaining. Karleigh Osborne, an unused substitute in the win, was then recalled by his parent club Bristol City after making four appearances until a hamstring injury ruled him out of action.

Colchester earned their first back-to-back victories of the season on 6 April when they beat play-off chasing Barnsley 3–1 at the Community Stadium. Barnsley took a 40th-minute lead through George Waring, but after the break the U's scored three unanswered goals in 24 minutes. Gavin Massey levelled on 62-minutes, before turning provider to Jabob Murphy on 80-minutes. Six minutes later, George Moncur's third goal in as many games sealed an important win and reduced the gap to safety to just two points.

The U's suffered two consecutive away defeats, first 1–0 to Coventry City on 11 April, and then a humiliating 6–0 thrashing by Chesterfield on 14 April, with the hosts scoring three in each half.

On 18 April, Colchester hosted Scunthorpe United. Scunthorpe took a 30th-minute lead, and they held on until the 81st-minute when Tom Eastman levelled with his first goal of the season. Chris Porter then made it 2–1 to the home side as they looked to close the gap on the sides above them in the table, but Hakeeb Adelakun scored with a deflected effort after two minutes of injury time to cost the U's two points. This meant the U's remained four points from safety with a possible nine available.

Despite the receding chances of League One survival, chairman Robbie Cowling publicly backed manager Tony Humes on 20 April, stating whether the club survive in League One for another season or not, Humes would remain in his role for 2015–16.

Tom Lapslie signed a three-year contract extension on 23 April.

Colchester made their final away trip of the season to Fleetwood Town on 25 April. The U's took the lead just after the break through George Moncur, but were pegged back on 65-minutes. Fleetwood then took the lead ten minutes later, and with results standing as they were, Colchester would be relegated. They scored an equaliser through Gavin Massey on 84-minutes, and three minutes later, Dion Sembie-Ferris was fouled in the penalty area. Chris Porter stepped up to convert the penalty and secure a crucial three points for his side, with the U's now two points from safety but with a game in hand over their relegation rivals.

With an opportunity to lift themselves out of the relegation places with a win at home to Swindon on 28 April, Colchester had the best possible start when Jacob Murphy tapped in after just 37-seconds of their encounter. Colchester were made to pay for missed chances in the first-half however when Swindon equalised on 53-minutes. The home side pushed for a winner but settled for a 1–1 draw, leaving them 22nd in League One, one point from safety and relying on a final day win over Preston and other results working for them to survive the threat of relegation.

=== May ===
The final game of the 2014–15 season was to be played at the Community Stadium against Preston North End, who were second in League One and needing to match Milton Keynes Dons result against Yeovil Town to gain promotion to the Championship. Anything but a win against Preston would mean relegation for Colchester, while they needed to rely on other results working in their favour to survive. With so much riding on the game, the match was selected to be shown live on Sky Sports. In an end-to-end game, Colchester were under pressure from Preston but defended resolutely to keep the score at 0–0 at half-time. George Moncur was fouled in the penalty area by Preston goalkeeper Sam Johnstone, and Chris Porter stepped up to take the kick. However, he sent the ball over the bar. In the 82nd-minute, Chris Porter held the ball up for George Moncur to score the crucial goal that gave Colchester a 1–0 lead. They held off a Preston onslaught for the remainder of normal time and five minutes of added time. With relegation rivals Crawley, Crewe, and Notts County, and Leyton Orient only managing a draw, the U's remained in League One by two points, finished in 19th-position and safety. Colchester's performance and result against Preston earned the club the League Managers Association 'Performance of the 'Week' award, as voted by the panel consisting of LMA chairman Howard Wilkinson, Alex Ferguson, Joe Royle, Dave Bassett, and Barry Fry.

== Players ==
As of match played 3 May 2015.

No.	Name	Position	Nationality	Place of birth	Date of birth	Apps	Goals	Signed from	Date signed	Fee
Goalkeepers
1	Sam Walker	GK	(England)	Gravesend	2 October 1991 (aged 22)	68	0	(England) Chelsea	20 January 2014	Free transfer
12	Chris Lewington	GK	(England)	Sidcup	23 August 1988 (aged 25)	0	0	(England) Dagenham & Redbridge	1 July 2014	Free transfer
29	James Bransgrove	GK	(England)	Harlow	12 May 1995 (aged 19)	0	0	(England) Brentford	1 July 2013	Free transfer
Defenders
2	Alex Wynter	DF	(England)	Croydon	15 September 1993 (aged 20)	6	1	(England) Crystal Palace	9 January 2015	Free transfer
3	Ben Gordon	LB	(England)	Bradford	2 March 1991 (aged 23)	0	0	(Scotland) Ross County	7 July 2014	Free transfer
4	Magnus Okuonghae	CB	(England)	(Nigeria) Lagos	16 February 1986 (aged 28)	204	7	(England) Dagenham & Redbridge	1 July 2009	£60,000
18	Tom Eastman	CB	(England)	Colchester	21 October 1991 (aged 22)	98	5	(England) Ipswich Town	1 July 2011	Free transfer
22	Kevin Lokko	CB	(England)	Whitechapel	3 November 1995 (aged 18)	0	0	(England) Norwich City	6 August 2014	Free transfer
23	Kane Vincent-Young	FB	(England)	Camden Town	15 March 1996 (aged 18)	0	0	(England) Banbury United	23 September 2014	Free transfer
26	Frankie Kent	CB	(England)	Romford	21 November 1995 (aged 18)	1	0	Academy	2 July 2012	Free transfer
35	Michael O'Donoghue	DF	(Republic of Ireland)	(England) Islington	18 January 1996 (aged 18)	0	0	Academy	2 July 2012	Free transfer
40	Jamie Harney	CB/RB	(Northern Ireland)	Plumbridge	4 March 1996 (aged 18)	1	0	(England) West Ham United	28 January 2015	Free transfer
Midfielders
8	Alex Gilbey	MF	(England)	Dagenham	9 December 1994 (aged 19)	43	1	Youth team	4 July 2011	Free transfer
16	Byron Lawrence	MF	(England)	Cambridge	12 March 1996 (aged 18)	0	0	(England) Ipswich Town	2 September 2014	Free transfer
17	Drey Wright	MF	(England)	Greenwich	30 April 1995 (aged 19)	36	3	Youth team	4 July 2011	Free transfer
24	George Moncur	MF	(England)	Swindon	18 August 1993 (aged 20)	20	3	(England) West Ham United	18 November 2014	Undisclosed
28	Sammie Szmodics	AM	(England)	Colchester	24 September 1995 (aged 18)	8	0	Academy	1 October 2013	Free transfer
30	Jack Curtis	MF	(England)	Brentwood	11 September 1995 (aged 18)	0	0	Academy	2 July 2012	Free transfer
32	Tom Lapslie	MF	(England)	Waltham Forest	5 May 1995 (aged 19)	0	0	Academy	2 July 2012	Free transfer
37	Dion Sembie-Ferris	MF/WG	(England)	Peterborough	23 May 1996 (aged 18)	0	0	(England) St Neots Town	25 November 2013	Undisclosed
38	David Fox	MF	(England)	Leek	13 December 1983 (aged 30)	21	3	(England) Norwich City	6 October 2014	Free transfer
Forwards
7	Sanchez Watt	ST	(England)	Hackney	14 February 1991 (aged 23)	30	5	(England) Arsenal	1 July 2013	Free transfer
9	Jabo Ibehre	FW	(England)	Islington	28 January 1983 (aged 31)	70	17	(England) Milton Keynes Dons	21 January 2013	Free transfer
10	Dan Holman	FW	(England)	Northampton	5 June 1990 (aged 23)	0	0	(England) Braintree Town	8 July 2014	Free transfer
14	Tosin Olufemi	WG/FB	(England)	Hackney	13 May 1994 (aged 20)	15	0	Academy	1 July 2012	Free transfer
21	Gavin Massey	FW	(England)	Watford	4 October 1992 (aged 21)	80	9	(England) Watford	21 August 2012	Free transfer
27	Macauley Bonne	ST	(Zimbabwe)	(England) Ipswich	26 October 1995 (aged 18)	15	3	Academy	2 July 2012	Free transfer
36	Dominic Smith	ST	(England)	Crewe	22 September 1995 (aged 18)	0	0	(England) Crewe Alexandra	1 July 2014	Free transfer
42	Chris Porter	CF	(England)	Wigan	12 December 1983 (aged 30)	0	0	(England) Sheffield United	21 January 2015	Free transfer
Scholars
	Marley Andrews	DF	(England)		9 September 1996 (aged 17)	0	0	Academy	15 July 2013	Free transfer
	Cameron James	DF	(England)	Chelmsford	11 February 1998 (aged 16)	0	0	Academy	30 June 2014	Free transfer
	JJ Wilson	DF	(England)			0	0	Academy	30 June 2014	Free transfer
	Tyler Brampton	MF	(England)		30 January 1997 (aged 17)	0	0	Academy	15 July 2013	Free transfer
	Callum Harrison	MF	(England)		19 March 1997 (aged 17)	0	0	Academy	15 July 2013	Free transfer
	Diaz Wright	CM	(England)	Greenwich	22 February 1998 (aged 16)	0	0	Academy	30 June 2014	Free transfer
	George Brown	FW	(England)	Romford	3 March 1998 (aged 16)	0	0	Academy	30 June 2014	Free transfer
	Tariq Issa	FW	(England)		2 September 1997 (aged 16)	0	0	Academy	30 June 2014	Free transfer
	Decarrey Sheriff	FW	(England)	Southwark	18 February 1998 (aged 16)	0	0	Academy	1 April 2015	Free transfer

== Transfers ==
=== In ===
Date	Position	Nationality	Name	From	Fee	Ref.
30 June 2014	FW	(England)	George Brown	Academy	Free transfer	
30 June 2014	FW	(England)	Tariq Issa	Academy	Free transfer	
30 June 2014	DF	(England)	Cameron James	Academy	Free transfer	
30 June 2014	DF	(England)	JJ Wilson	Academy	Free transfer	
30 June 2014	CM	(England)	Diaz Wright	Academy	Free transfer	
1 July 2014	RB	(England)	Sean Clohessy	(Scotland) Kilmarnock	Free transfer	
1 July 2014	GK	(England)	Chris Lewington	(England) Dagenham & Redbridge	Free transfer	
1 July 2014	ST	(England)	Dominic Smith	(England) Crewe Alexandra	Free transfer	
7 July 2014	LB	(England)	Ben Gordon	(Scotland) Ross County	Free transfer	
8 July 2014	FW	(England)	Dan Holman	(England) Braintree Town	Free transfer	
6 August 2014	CB	(England)	Kevin Lokko	(England) Norwich City	Free transfer	
2 September 2014	MF	(England)	Byron Lawrence	(England) Ipswich Town	Free transfer	
23 September 2014	FB	(England)	Kane Vincent-Young	(England) Banbury United	Free transfer	
6 October 2014	MF	(England)	David Fox	(England) Norwich City	Free transfer	
18 November 2014	MF	(England)	George Moncur	(England) West Ham United	Undisclosed	
7 December 2014	CB	(Latvia)	Kaspars Gorkšs	(England) Reading	Free transfer	
9 January 2015	DF	(England)	Alex Wynter	(England) Crystal Palace	Free transfer	
21 January 2015	CF	(England)	Chris Porter	(England) Sheffield United	Free transfer	
28 January 2015	CB/RB	(Northern Ireland)	Jamie Harney	(England) West Ham United	Free transfer	
1 April 2015	FW	(England)	Decarrey Sheriff	Academy	Free transfer	

- Total spending: ▼ ~ £0

=== Out ===
Date	Position	Nationality	Name	To	Fee	Ref.
5 May 2014	MF	(England)	Karl Duguid	(England) Stanway Rovers (Note: Following Karl Duguid's release by Colchester United, he later joined Stanway Rovers.)	Released	
6 May 2014	GK	(England)	Shaun Phillips	(England) Needham Market (Note: Following Shaun Phillips' release by Colchester United, he later joined Needham Market.)	Released	
6 May 2014	MF	(England)	Jordan Sanderson	(England) Ebbsfleet United (Note: Following Jordan Sanderson's release by Colchester United, he later joined Ebbsfleet United.)	Released	
6 May 2014	FB	(England)	Brian Wilson	(England) Oldham Athletic (Note: Following Brian Wilson's rejection of a new contract offer by Colchester United, he signed a pre-contract agreement with Oldham Athletic.)	Free transfer	
4 June 2014	FB	(England)	Ryan Dickson	(England) Crawley Town	Free transfer	
30 June 2014	FW	(Republic of Ireland)	Clinton Morrison	(England) Long Eaton United (Note: Following Clinton Morrison's release by Colchester United, he later joined Long Eaton United.)	Released	
30 June 2014	MF	(Wales)	Jack Simmons	(England) Leiston (Note: Following Jack Simmons' release by Colchester United, he later joined Leiston.)	Released	
1 July 2014	GK	(England)	Mark Cousins	(England) Dagenham & Redbridge	Free transfer	
26 November 2014	FB/DM	(England)	David Wright	Free agent	Retired	
2 December 2014	AM	(England)	Dominic Vose	(England) Welling United (Note: Following Dominic Vose's release by Colchester United, he later joined Welling United.)	Released	
8 January 2015	MF	(Jamaica)	Marcus Bean	(England) Wycombe Wanderers (Note: Following Marcus Bean's release by Colchester United, he later joined Wycombe Wanderers.)	Released	
16 January 2015	ST	(England)	Freddie Sears	(England) Ipswich Town	Undisclosed	
26 January 2015	ST	(Nigeria)	Nnamdi Nwachuku	Free agent	Released	
26 January 2015	DF	(England)	Billy Roast	(England) AFC Hornchurch (Note: Following Billy Roast's release by Colchester United, he later joined AFC Hornchurch.)	Released	
28 January 2015	CB	(England)	Josh Thompson	(England) Tranmere Rovers	Released	
29 January 2015	CB	(Latvia)	Kaspars Gorkšs	(Greece) Ergotelis	Free transfer	
2 February 2015	MF	(England)	Craig Eastmond	(England) Yeovil Town (Note: Following Craig Eastmond's release by Colchester United, he later joined Yeovil Town.)	Released	
19 March 2015	AM	(England)	Conor Hubble	(England) Leiston (Note: Following Conor Hubble's release by Colchester United, he later joined Leiston.)	Released	
1 May 2015	RB	(England)	Sean Clohessy	(England) Leyton Orient (Note: Following Sean Clohessy's release by Colchester United, he later joined Leyton Orient.)	Released	

- Total incoming: ▲ ~ £0

=== Loans in ===
Date	Position	Nationality	Name	From	End date	Ref.
11 July 2014	MF	(England)	George Moncur	(England) West Ham United	17 November 2014	
19 September 2014	FW	(England)	Rhys Healey	(Wales) Cardiff City	31 May 2015	
6 October 2014	RB	(Wales)	Elliott Hewitt	(England) Ipswich Town	3 November 2014	
4 November 2014	MF	(England)	Kemar Roofe	(England) West Bromwich Albion	4 December 2014	
12 November 2014	CB/RB	(Northern Ireland)	Jamie Harney	(England) West Ham United	27 January 2015	
13 November 2014	RB	(Wales)	Elliott Hewitt	(England) Ipswich Town	26 March 2015	
20 November 2014	DF	(England)	Cole Kpekawa	(England) Queens Park Rangers	25 January 2015	
24 November 2014	DF/DM	(United States)	Will Packwood	(England) Birmingham City	11 December 2014	
20 January 2015	CF	(England)	Jack Marriott	(England) Ipswich Town	31 May 2015	
22 January 2015	FB	(Guyana)	Matthew Briggs	(England) Millwall	31 May 2015	
30 January 2015	MF/WG	(Republic of Ireland)	Kenny McEvoy	(England) Tottenham Hotspur	14 March 2015	
26 February 2015	DF	(England)	Karleigh Osborne	(England) Bristol City	5 April 2015	
13 March 2015	CB	(South Africa)	Bongani Khumalo	(England) Tottenham Hotspur	31 May 2015	
13 March 2015	MF/WG	(England)	Jacob Murphy	(England) Norwich City	31 May 2015	
26 March 2015	FB	(England)	Richard Brindley	(England) Rotherham United	31 May 2015	

=== Loans out ===
Date	Position	Nationality	Name	To	End date	Ref.
19 September 2014	FW	(England)	Dan Holman	(Wales) Wrexham	19 October 2014	
19 September 2014	ST	(Nigeria)	Nnamdi Nwachuku	(England) Leiston		
10 October 2014	FW	(England)	Jabo Ibehre	(England) Oldham Athletic	10 January 2015	
24 October 2014	FW	(England)	Dan Holman	(England) Aldershot Town	5 January 2015	
24 October 2014	AM	(England)	Conor Hubble	(England) Leiston		
24 October 2014	CB	(England)	Josh Thompson	(England) Tranmere Rovers	24 January 2015	
21 November 2014	MF	(Jamaica)	Marcus Bean	(England) Portsmouth	3 January 2015	
21 November 2014	DF	(England)	Billy Roast	(England) AFC Hornchurch		
1 January 2015	ST	(England)	Dominic Smith	(England) AFC Hornchurch		
2 February 2015	FW	(England)	Dan Holman	(England) Dover Athletic	31 May 2015	
6 March 2015	FW	(England)	Jabo Ibehre	(England) Barnsley	3 May 2015	
13 March 2015	GK	(England)	James Bransgrove	(England) Bishop's Stortford	1 June 2015	

=== Contracts ===
New contracts and contract extensions.

Date	Position	Nationality	Name	Length	Expiry	Ref.
14 May 2014	AM	(England)	Dominic Vose	2 years	June 2016	
1 July 2014	GK	(England)	Chris Lewington	2 years	June 2016	
1 July 2014	ST	(England)	Dominic Smith	1 year	June 2015	
1 July 2014	CB	(England)	Josh Thompson	1 year	June 2015	
1 July 2014	FB/DM	(England)	David Wright	1 year	June 2015	
7 July 2014	RB	(England)	Sean Clohessy	2 years	June 2016	
7 July 2014	LB	(England)	Ben Gordon	2 years	June 2016	
8 July 2014	FW	(England)	Dan Holman	2 years	June 2016	
2 September 2014	MF	(England)	Byron Lawrence	1 year	June 2015	
12 September 2014	FB	(England)	Kane Vincent-Young	1 year	June 2015	
6 October 2014	MF	(England)	David Fox	3 months	January 2015	
9 October 2014	AM	(England)	Sammie Szmodics	3 1/2 years	January 2018	
10 October 2014	CB	(England)	Frankie Kent	3 1/2 years	June 2018	
16 October 2014	CB	(England)	Tom Eastman	1 1/2 years	June 2016	
16 October 2014	FW	(England)	Gavin Massey	2 1/2 years	June 2017	
18 November 2014	MF	(England)	George Moncur	2 1/2 years	June 2017	
11 December 2014	GK	(England)	Sam Walker	1 1/2 years	June 2016	
6 January 2015	MF	(England)	David Fox	6 months	June 2015	
9 January 2015	DF	(England)	Alex Wynter	1 1/2 years	June 2016	
13 January 2015	CB/RB	(Northern Ireland)	Jamie Harney	1 1/2 years	June 2016	
21 January 2015	CF	(England)	Chris Porter	1 1/2 years	June 2016	
2 February 2015	DF	(England)	Marley Andrews	1 1/2 years	June 2016	
26 February 2015	ST	(Zimbabwe)	Macauley Bonne	2 1/2 years	June 2017	
23 April 2015	MF	(England)	Tom Lapslie	3 years	June 2018	

== Match details ==
=== Friendlies ===
12 July 2014 Friendly	Brantham Athletic	1–4	Colchester United	Brantham
15:00 BST	Mann 70'	Report	Vose 14'; Ibehre 42'; Holman 52'; Sears 85' (pen.)	Stadium: Brantham Leisure Centre

15 July 2014 Friendly	Heybridge Swifts	0–8	Colchester United	Heybridge
19:30 BST		Report	Sears 16', 30'; Moncur 18'; Da. Wright 20'; Massey 58'; Vose 67'; Ibehre 70', 90'	Stadium: Scraley Road; Attendance: 315

17 July 2014 Friendly	AFC Sudbury	1–4	Colchester United	Sudbury
19:45 BST	Hughes 61'	Report	Sears 33' (pen.); Dr. Wright 38'; Szmodics 65'; Holman 75'	Stadium: King's Marsh Stadium; Attendance: 307

19 July 2014 Friendly	Leiston	1–8	Colchester United	Leiston
15:00 BST	Heath 52'	Report	Holman 5'; Massey 43'; Szmodics 45'; Sears 55', 56', 65', 76'; Dr. Wright 65'	Stadium: Victory Road

23 July 2014 Friendly	Colchester United	0–3	Ipswich Town	Colchester
19:30 BST		Report	Nouble 55', 57'; Marriott 77'	Stadium: Colchester Community Stadium; Attendance: 3,159; Referee: Pat Miller

25 July 2014 Friendly	Dover Athletic	2–2	Colchester United	River
19:45 BST	Stone 5'; Elder 78'	Report	Szmodics 30'; Thompson 40'	Stadium: Crabble Athletic Ground; Referee: Nigel Lugg

26 July 2014 Friendly	Dagenham & Redbridge	3–4	Colchester United	Dagenham
15:00 BST	Ogogo 16'; Hemmings 43'; Chambers 60'	Report	Bonne 7'; Vose 65', 76'; Ibehre 78'	Stadium: Victoria Road

29 July 2014 Friendly	Luton Town	2–2	Colchester United	Luton
19:45 BST	Cullen 26'; Guttridge 69'	Report	Connolly 21' (o.g.); Ibehre 51'	Stadium: Kenilworth Road; Attendance: 1,475

30 July 2014 Friendly	Bishop's Stortford	2–0	Colchester United	Bishop's Stortford
19:45 BST	Sellears 46', 47'	Report		Stadium: Woodside Park; Attendance: 171; Referee: Nigel Lugg

30 July 2014 Friendly	Colchester United	P–P	Charlton Athletic	Colchester
19:30 BST		Report		Stadium: Colchester Community Stadium
Note: Following the League Cup draw which paired the sides at The Valley in the first round, both clubs agreed to cancel the friendly fixture.

=== League One ===
==== League table ====
Pos	Team	Pld	W	D	L	GF	GA	GD	Pts	Promotion, qualification or relegation
17	Coventry City	46	13	16	17	49	60	−11	55	
18	Port Vale	46	15	9	22	55	65	−10	54	
19	Colchester United	46	14	10	22	58	77	−19	52	
20	Crewe Alexandra	46	14	10	22	43	75	−32	52	
21	Notts County (R)	46	12	14	20	45	63	−18	50	Relegation to Football League Two

Updated to match(es) played on 3 May 2015. Source: BBC Sport
Rules for classification: 1) Points; 2) Goal difference; 3) Number of goals scored
(R) Relegated

==== Results round by round ====
Round	1	2	3	4	5	6	7	8	9	10	11	12	13	14	15	16	17	18	19	20	21	22	23	24	25	26	27	28	29	30	31	32	33	34	35	36	37	38	39	40	41	42	43	44	45	46
Ground	H	A	A	H	H	A	A	H	H	A	A	H	A	H	A	H	A	H	A	H	A	H	A	A	H	H	A	H	A	A	H	H	A	H	A	H	H	A	A	H	A	A	H	A	H	H
Result	D	L	L	L	L	D	W	L	D	W	L	W	D	W	D	L	L	L	L	L	W	L	D	W	L	W	D	L	L	W	L	W	L	L	L	L	W	D	W	W	L	L	D	W	D	W
Position	10	17	22	22	23	23	21	22	23	20	21	16	16	14	14	18	18	21	22	23	21	23	23	22	22	21	21	21	21	21	21	20	22	22	22	23	23	23	23	23	23	23	23	23	22	19

Source: Statto.com (archived)
A = Away; H = Home; W = Win; D = Draw; L = Loss

==== Matches ====
9 August 2014 1	Colchester United	2–2	Oldham Athletic	Colchester
15:00 BST	Okuonghae 7'; Moncur 58'	Report	Forte 18', 40'	Stadium: Colchester Community Stadium; Attendance: 4,023; Referee: Dean Whitestone

16 August 2014 2	Bristol City	2–1	Colchester United	Bristol
15:00 BST	Wilbraham 46', 68'	Report	Moncur 9'	Stadium: Ashton Gate Stadium; Attendance: 11,626; Referee: Brendan Malone

19 August 2014 3	Notts County	2–1	Colchester United	Nottingham
19:45 BST	Murray 6'; Noble 71'; Keane (yellow card) 77' (red card); Wroe (yellow card) 89' (red card)	Report	Sears 69'	Stadium: Meadow Lane; Attendance: 3,792; Referee: Geoff Eltringham

23 August 2014 4	Colchester United	0–1	Doncaster Rovers	Colchester
15:00 BST		Report	Bennett 65'	Stadium: Colchester Community Stadium; Attendance: 3,162; Referee: Gavin Ward

30 August 2014 5	Colchester United	1–3	Peterborough United	Colchester
15:00 BST	Sears 64'	Report	Washington 21'; Ntlhe 25' (yellow card) 80' (red card); Anderson 77'	Stadium: Colchester Community Stadium; Attendance: 4,014; Referee: Carl Boyeson

6 September 2014 6	Walsall	0–0	Colchester United	Walsall
15:00 BST		Report		Stadium: Bescot Stadium; Attendance: 4,009; Referee: Pat Miller

13 September 2014 7	Leyton Orient	0–2	Colchester United	Leyton
15:00 BST		Report	Watt 62'; Sears 73'; Okuonghae (red card) 44'	Stadium: Brisbane Road; Attendance: 5,313; Referee: Keith Stroud

16 September 2014 8	Colchester United	2–3	Sheffield United	Colchester
19:45 BST	Moncur 31'; Sears 77'	Report	Davies 83', 88' (pen.); Flynn 85'	Stadium: Colchester Community Stadium; Attendance: 3,084; Referee: Oliver Langford

20 September 2014 9	Colchester United	0–0	Bradford City	Colchester
15:00 BST		Report		Stadium: Colchester Community Stadium; Attendance: 3,524; Referee: Keith Hill

27 September 2014 10	Crewe Alexandra	0–3	Colchester United	Crewe
15:00 BST		Report	Sears 57'; Healey 63'; Watt 67'	Stadium: Gresty Road; Attendance: 3,909; Referee: Paul Tierney

4 October 2014 11	Preston North End	4–2	Colchester United	Preston
15:00 BST	Wiseman 21'; Browne 25'; Gallagher 47'; Humphrey 57'	Report	Healey 16'; Gilbey 37'	Stadium: Deepdale; Attendance: 8,478; Referee: Stephen Martin

11 October 2014 12	Colchester United	2–1	Fleetwood Town	Colchester
15:00 BST	Massey 40', 76'	Report	McAlinden 18'	Stadium: Colchester Community Stadium; Attendance: 3,383; Referee: Graham Scott

18 October 2014 13	Scunthorpe United	1–1	Colchester United	Scunthorpe
15:00 BST	Fallon 20'	Report	Sears 33'	Stadium: Glanford Park; Attendance: 3,303; Referee: David Coote

21 October 2014 14	Colchester United	2–1	Chesterfield	Colchester
19:45 BST	Healey 50'; Sears 87'	Report	Clucas 1'	Stadium: Colchester Community Stadium; Attendance: 2,718; Referee: Darren Sheldrake

25 October 2014 15	Swindon Town	2–2	Colchester United	Swindon
15:00 BST	Smith 27', 48'	Report	Healey 47'; Massey 52'	Stadium: County Ground; Attendance: 7,871; Referee: Chris Sarginson

1 November 2014 16	Colchester United	1–2	Port Vale	Colchester
15:00 GMT	Sears 79'	Report	Marshall 56'; Daniel 60'	Stadium: Colchester Community Stadium; Attendance: 3,571; Referee: Trevor Kettle

14 November 2014 17	Barnsley	3–2	Colchester United	Barnsley
19:45 GMT	Winnall 4'; Hourihane 55' (pen.); Ramage 75'	Report	Watt 15'; Sears 75'	Stadium: Oakwell; Attendance: 9,191; Referee: Richard Clark

22 November 2014 18	Colchester United	0–1	Coventry City	Colchester
15:00 GMT		Report	Madine 74'	Stadium: Colchester Community Stadium; Attendance: 4,433; Referee: Andy Woolmer

29 November 2014 19	Milton Keynes Dons	6–0	Colchester United	Milton Keynes
15:00 GMT	Alli 11'; Afobe 37', 45', 58'; Reeves 67' (pen.); Hodson 90'	Report	Packwood (red card) 67'	Stadium: Stadium MK; Attendance: 7,646; Referee: Scott Mathieson

13 December 2014 20	Colchester United	1–4	Rochdale	Colchester
15:00 GMT	Massey 50'	Report	Lund 26'; Vincenti 29'; Henderson 41' (pen.); O'Connell 56'	Stadium: Colchester Community Stadium; Attendance: 2,920; Referee: Charles Breakspear

20 December 2014 21	Yeovil Town	0–1	Colchester United	Yeovil
15:00 GMT		Report	Eastmond 72'	Stadium: Huish Park; Attendance: 6,837; Referee: Carl Boyeson

26 December 2014 22	Colchester United	1–2	Gillingham	Colchester
15:00 GMT	Szmodics 51'	Report	Martin 25'; Dack 34'	Stadium: Colchester Community Stadium; Attendance: 4,544; Referee: Graham Horwood

28 December 2014 23	Crawley Town	0–0	Colchester United	Crawley
15:00 GMT		Report		Stadium: Broadfield Stadium; Attendance: 2,046; Referee: Pat Miller

3 January 2015	Colchester United	P–P	Milton Keynes Dons	Colchester
		Report		Stadium: Colchester Community Stadium
Note: Match postponed due to Colchester's involvement in the FA Cup. Additionally, MK Dons were ordered to replay their second round FA Cup tie against Chesterfield on 2 January after Chesterfield had fielded an ineligible player in the first game.

10 January 2015 24	Peterborough United	0–2	Colchester United	Peterborough
15:00 GMT		Report	Sears 54'; Hewitt 84'	Stadium: London Road Stadium; Attendance: 5,524; Referee: Jeremy Simpson

17 January 2015 25	Colchester United	0–2	Walsall	Colchester
15:00 GMT		Report	Forde 33'; Cain 75'	Stadium: Colchester Community Stadium; Attendance: 2,980; Referee: Brendan Malone

24 January 2015 26	Colchester United	2–0	Leyton Orient	Colchester
15:00 GMT	Massey 14'; Gorkšs 47'; Hewitt (red card) 83'	Report		Stadium: Colchester Community Stadium; Attendance: 5,668; Referee: Mark Heywood

31 January 2015 27	Bradford City	1–1	Colchester United	Bradford
15:00 GMT	Morais 77'	Report	Porter 5'	Stadium: Valley Parade; Attendance: 13,917; Referee: Kevin Johnson

7 February 2015 28	Colchester United	2–3	Crewe Alexandra	Colchester
15:00 GMT	Porter 45'; Marriott 84'	Report	Jones 68'; Ajose 73'; Grant 81'	Stadium: Colchester Community Stadium; Attendance: 3,134; Referee: Tim Robinson

10 February 2015 29	Sheffield United	4–1	Colchester United	Sheffield
19:45 GMT	Baxter 8', 80'; Done 37'; McEveley 59'	Report	Szmodics 70'	Stadium: Bramall Lane; Attendance: 17,162; Referee: Chris Sarginson

14 February 2015 30	Oldham Athletic	0–1	Colchester United	Oldham
15:00 GMT		Report	Szmodics 2'	Stadium: Boundary Park; Attendance: 5,668; Referee: Rob Lewis

17 February 2015 31	Colchester United	0–1	Milton Keynes Dons	Colchester
19:45 GMT		Report	Alli 44'	Stadium: Colchester Community Stadium; Attendance: 2,974; Referee: Andy Davies

21 February 2015 32	Colchester United	3–2	Bristol City	Colchester
15:00 GMT	Lapslie 3'; Bonne 14'; Porter 26'	Report	Tavernier 50'; Flint 61'	Stadium: Colchester Community Stadium; Attendance: 4,300; Referee: Stephen Martin

28 February 2015 33	Doncaster Rovers	2–0	Colchester United	Doncaster
15:00 GMT	Stevens 39'; Tyson 83' (pen.)	Report		Stadium: Keepmoat Stadium; Attendance: 6,330; Referee: Peter Bankes

3 March 2015 34	Colchester United	0–1	Notts County	Colchester
19:45 GMT		Report	McCourt 68'	Stadium: Colchester Community Stadium; Attendance: 2,505; Referee: Carl Berry

7 March 2015 35	Rochdale	2–1	Colchester United	Rochdale
15:00 GMT	Bennett 6'; Henderson 55'	Report	Porter 63' (pen.)	Stadium: Spotland Stadium; Attendance: 2,625; Referee: Oliver Langford

14 March 2015 36	Colchester United	2–3	Crawley Town	Colchester
15:00 GMT	Szmodics 11'; Fox 49'	Report	Dickson 15'; Tomlin 41'; McLeod 75' (pen.)	Stadium: Colchester Community Stadium; Attendance: 3,592; Referee: James Adcock

17 March 2015 37	Colchester United	2–0	Yeovil Town	Colchester
19:45 GMT	Fox 54' (pen.); Murphy 58'	Report		Stadium: Colchester Community Stadium; Attendance: 2,336; Referee: Iain Williamson

21 March 2015 38	Gillingham	2–2	Colchester United	Gillingham
15:00 GMT	Ehmer 82'; Loft 90+6'	Report	Moncur 62'; Porter 87'; Briggs (yellow card) 90+4' (red card)	Stadium: Priestfield Stadium; Attendance: 5,319; Referee: Darren Sheldrake

28 March 2015	Colchester United	P–P	Swindon Town	Colchester
		Report		Stadium: Colchester Community Stadium
Note: Match postponed due to international call-ups for Swindon Town.

3 April 2015 39	Port Vale	1–2	Colchester United	Burslem
15:00 BST	Dodds 84'	Report	Moncur 57'; Murphy 77'	Stadium: Vale Park; Attendance: 4,471; Referee: Charles Breakspear

6 April 2015 40	Colchester United	3–1	Barnsley	Colchester
15:00 BST	Massey 62'; Murphy 80'; Moncur 86'	Report	Waring 40'	Stadium: Colchester Community Stadium; Attendance: 5,157; Referee: Keith Hill

11 April 2015 41	Coventry City	1–0	Colchester United	Coventry
15:00 BST	O'Brien 36'	Report		Stadium: Ricoh Arena; Attendance: 8,933; Referee: David Webb

14 April 2015 42	Chesterfield	6–0	Colchester United	Chesterfield
19:45 BST	Roberts 6', 84' (pen.); Clucas 16', 17'; Gardner 58'; Ryan 60'	Report		Stadium: Proact Stadium; Attendance: 6,508; Referee: Simon Hooper

18 April 2015 43	Colchester United	2–2	Scunthorpe United	Colchester
15:00 BST	Eastman 81'; Porter 85'	Report	Robinson 30'; Adelakun 90+2'	Stadium: Colchester Community Stadium; Attendance: 4,551; Referee: Peter Bankes

25 April 2015 44	Fleetwood Town	2–3	Colchester United	Fleetwood
15:00 BST	Proctor 65'; Ball 74'	Report	Moncur 47'; Massey 84'; Porter 87' (pen.)	Stadium: Highbury Stadium; Attendance: 3,129; Referee: Darren Bond

28 April 2015 45	Colchester United	1–1	Swindon Town	Colchester
19:45 BST	Murphy 1'	Report	Gladwin 53'	Stadium: Colchester Community Stadium; Attendance: 4,395; Referee: Kevin Johnson

3 May 2015 46	Colchester United	1–0	Preston North End	Colchester
12:15 BST	Moncur 82'	Report		Stadium: Colchester Community Stadium; Attendance: 8,413; Referee: Keith Stroud

=== Football League Cup ===
12 August 2014 1st round	Charlton Athletic	4–0	Colchester United	Charlton
19:45 BST	Buyens 24' (pen.); Wilson 54', 58'; Church 89'	Report	Okuonghae (red card) 28'	Stadium: The Valley; Attendance: 5,752; Referee: Charles Breakspear

=== Football League Trophy ===
7 October 2014 2nd round (southern section)	Colchester United	3–3 (2–4 p)	Gillingham	Colchester
19:45 BST	Dr. Wright 17'; Watt 38' (pen.); Sears 87'	Report; Report	Dickenson 24'; Dack 55'; German 74'	Stadium: Colchester Community Stadium; Attendance: 1,401; Referee: Michael Bull
	Penalties
	Sears (penalty scored); Moncur (penalty missed); Eastman (penalty missed); Clohessy (penalty scored)		Dack (penalty scored); Fish (penalty scored); Hessenthaler (penalty scored); Nelson (penalty scored)

=== FA Cup ===
9 November 2014 1st round	Gosport Borough	3–6	Colchester United	Gosport
14:00 GMT	Bennett 39', 53'; Wort 90'	Report	Massey 14'; Watt 21'; Sears 26' (pen.), 78'; Gilbey 45'; Szmodics 90'	Stadium: Privett Park; Attendance: 2,013; Referee: Lee Collins

7 December 2014 2nd round	Colchester United	1–0	Peterborough United	Colchester
16:30 GMT	Moncur 90+1'	Report		Stadium: Colchester Community Stadium; Attendance: 2,905; Referee: Tony Harrington

2 January 2015 3rd round	Cardiff City	3–1	Colchester United	Cardiff
19:45 GMT	Ralls 34'; Harris 53'; Jones 60'	Report	Sears 74'	Stadium: Cardiff City Stadium; Attendance: 4,194; Referee: James Linington

== Squad statistics ==
=== Appearances and goals ===
No.	Pos	Nat	Player	Total		League One		FA Cup		League Cup		Football League Trophy	
No.	Pos	Nat	Player	Apps	Goals	Apps	Goals	Apps	Goals	Apps	Goals	Apps	Goals
1	GK	(England) ENG	Sam Walker	49	0	45	0	3	0	0	0	1	0
2	DF	(England) ENG	Alex Wynter	18	0	16+2	0	0	0	0	0	0	0
3	DF	(England) ENG	Ben Gordon	20	0	16+2	0	1	0	1	0	0	0
4	DF	(England) ENG	Magnus Okuonghae	11	1	8+1	1	1	0	1	0	0	0
7	FW	(England) ENG	Sanchez Watt	25	5	17+4	3	2+1	1	0	0	1	1
8	MF	(England) ENG	Alex Gilbey	36	2	32+2	1	1	1	1	0	0	0
9	FW	(England) ENG	Jabo Ibehre	6	0	5	0	0	0	1	0	0	0
10	FW	(England) ENG	Dan Holman	5	0	0+4	0	0	0	0+1	0	0	0
12	GK	(England) ENG	Chris Lewington	2	0	1	0	0	0	1	0	0	0
16	MF	(England) ENG	Byron Lawrence	1	0	0+1	0	0	0	0	0	0	0
17	MF	(England) ENG	Drey Wright	6	1	1+4	0	0	0	0	0	1	1
18	DF	(England) ENG	Tom Eastman	51	1	46	1	3	0	1	0	1	0
21	FW	(England) ENG	Gavin Massey	51	8	39+7	7	3	1	1	0	1	0
24	MF	(England) ENG	George Moncur	46	9	34+7	8	3	1	1	0	1	0
26	DF	(England) ENG	Frankie Kent	11	0	9+1	0	0	0	0	0	1	0
27	FW	(Zimbabwe) ZIM	Macauley Bonne	10	1	3+7	1	0	0	0	0	0	0
28	MF	(England) ENG	Sammie Szmodics	35	5	17+14	4	1+1	1	0+1	0	0+1	0
32	MF	(England) ENG	Tom Lapslie	12	1	11	1	0+1	0	0	0	0	0
35	DF	(Republic of Ireland) IRL	Michael O'Donoghue	1	0	1	0	0	0	0	0	0	0
36	FW	(England) ENG	Dominic Smith	1	0	0+1	0	0	0	0	0	0	0
37	MF	(England) ENG	Dion Sembie-Ferris	11	0	2+8	0	0+1	0	0	0	0	0
38	MF	(England) ENG	David Fox	33	2	29+1	2	3	0	0	0	0	0
40	DF	(Northern Ireland) NIR	Jamie Harney	1	0	0+1	0	0	0	0	0	0	0
42	FW	(England) ENG	Chris Porter	21	7	20+1	7	0	0	0	0	0	0
Players who appeared for Colchester who left during the season
2	DF	(England) ENG	David Wright	3	0	0+2	0	0	0	0	0	0+1	0
5	DF	(England) ENG	Karleigh Osborne	4	0	4	0	0	0	0	0	0	0
6	MF	(England) ENG	Craig Eastmond	13	1	6+4	1	1+1	0	0	0	1	0
6	DF	(South Africa) RSA	Bongani Khumalo	10	0	10	0	0	0	0	0	0	0
11	FW	(England) ENG	Jack Marriott	5	1	0+5	1	0	0	0	0	0	0
11	FW	(England) ENG	Freddie Sears	29	14	24	10	3	3	1	0	0+1	1
13	DF	(Latvia) LVA	Kaspars Gorkšs	9	1	7	1	2	0	0	0	0	0
15	MF	(Jamaica) JAM	Marcus Bean	4	0	3	0	0	0	0+1	0	0	0
15	DF	(Guyana) GUY	Matthew Briggs	18	0	17+1	0	0	0	0	0	0	0
19	FW	(England) ENG	Rhys Healey	23	4	7+14	4	0+1	0	0	0	1	0
20	DF	(England) ENG	Sean Clohessy	37	0	31+1	0	2+1	0	1	0	1	0
25	MF	(Republic of Ireland) IRL	Kenny McEvoy	1	0	0+1	0	0	0	0	0	0	0
25	MF	(England) ENG	Jacob Murphy	11	4	11	4	0	0	0	0	0	0
25	MF	(England) ENG	Dominic Vose	8	0	2+5	0	0	0	1	0	0	0
31	DF	(England) ENG	Richard Brindley	8	0	7+1	0	0	0	0	0	0	0
39	MF	(England) ENG	Kemar Roofe	3	0	0+2	0	0+1	0	0	0	0	0
41 (Note: Hewitt wore shirt number 39 during his first loan spell with the club)	DF	(Wales) WAL	Elliott Hewitt	24	1	21	1	2	0	0	0	1	0
42	DF	(England) ENG	Cole Kpekawa	6	0	3+1	0	2	0	0	0	0	0
43	DF	(United States) USA	Will Packwood	1	0	1	0	0	0	0	0	0	0

=== Goalscorers ===
Place	Number	Nationality	Position	Name	League One	FA Cup	League Cup	Football League Trophy	Total
1	11	(England)	ST	Freddie Sears	10	3	0	1	14
2	24	(England)	MF	George Moncur	8	1	0	0	9
3	21	(England)	FW	Gavin Massey	7	1	0	0	8
4	42	(England)	CF	Chris Porter	7	0	0	0	7
5	7	(England)	ST	Sanchez Watt	3	1	0	1	5
5	28	(England)	AM	Sammie Szmodics	4	1	0	0	5
7	19	(England)	FW	Rhys Healey	4	0	0	0	4
7	25	(England)	MF/WG	Jacob Murphy	4	0	0	0	4
9	8	(England)	MF	Alex Gilbey	1	1	0	0	2
9	38	(England)	MF	David Fox	2	0	0	0	2
11	4	(England)	CB	Magnus Okuonghae	1	0	0	0	1
11	6	(England)	MF	Craig Eastmond	1	0	0	0	1
11	11	(England)	CF	Jack Marriott	1	0	0	0	1
11	13	(Latvia)	CB	Kaspars Gorkšs	1	0	0	0	1
11	17	(England)	MF	Drey Wright	0	0	0	1	1
11	18	(England)	CB	Tom Eastman	1	0	0	0	1
11	27	(Zimbabwe)	ST	Macauley Bonne	1	0	0	0	1
11	32	(England)	MF	Tom Lapslie	1	0	0	0	1
11	41 (Note: Hewitt wore shirt number 39 during his first loan spell with the club)	(Wales)	RB	Elliott Hewitt	1	0	0	0	1
				Own goals	0	0	0	0	0
				TOTALS	58	8	0	3	69

=== Disciplinary record ===
Number	Nationality	Position	Name	League One		FA Cup		League Cup		Football League Trophy		Total	
Number	Nationality	Position	Name	Booked	Sent off (straight red)	Booked	Sent off (straight red)	Booked	Sent off (straight red)	Booked	Sent off (straight red)	Booked	Sent off (straight red)
8	(England)	MF	Alex Gilbey	9	0	0	0	0	0	0	0	9	0
18	(England)	CB	Tom Eastman	8	0	0	0	0	0	0	0	9	0
4	(England)	CB	Magnus Okuonghae	1	1	0	0	0	1	0	0	1	2
7	(England)	ST	Sanchez Watt	4	0	2	0	0	0	1	0	7	0
21	(England)	FW	Gavin Massey	6	0	0	0	0	0	0	0	6	0
15	(Guyana)	FB	Matthew Briggs	2	1	0	0	0	0	0	0	2	1
41 (Note: Hewitt wore shirt number 39 during his first loan spell with the club)	(Wales)	RB	Elliott Hewitt	2	1	0	0	0	0	0	0	2	1
2	(England)	DF	Alex Wynter	3	0	0	0	0	0	0	0	3	0
6	(England)	MF	Craig Eastmond	2	0	0	0	0	0	1	0	3	0
32	(England)	MF	Tom Lapslie	3	0	0	0	0	0	0	0	3	0
43	(United States)	DF/DM	Will Packwood	0	1	0	0	0	0	0	0	0	1
3	(England)	LB	Ben Gordon	2	0	0	0	0	0	0	0	2	0
20	(England)	RB	Sean Clohessy	2	0	0	0	0	0	0	0	2	0
24	(England)	MF	George Moncur	1	0	1	0	0	0	0	0	2	0
28	(England)	AM	Sammie Szmodics	2	0	0	0	0	0	0	0	2	0
1	(England)	GK	Sam Walker	1	0	0	0	0	0	0	0	1	0
5	(England)	DF	Karleigh Osborne	1	0	0	0	0	0	0	0	1	0
15	(Jamaica)	MF	Marcus Bean	1	0	0	0	0	0	0	0	1	0
19	(England)	FW	Rhys Healey	1	0	0	0	0	0	0	0	1	0
26	(England)	CB	Frankie Kent	1	0	0	0	0	0	0	0	1	0
38	(England)	MF	David Fox	1	0	0	0	0	0	0	0	1	0
42	(England)	DF	Cole Kpekawa	1	0	0	0	0	0	0	0	1	0
42	(England)	CF	Chris Porter	1	0	0	0	0	0	0	0	1	0
			TOTALS	55	4	3	0	0	1	2	0	60	5

=== Captains ===
Number of games played as team captain.

Place	Number	Nationality	Position	Player	League One	FA Cup	League Cup	Football League Trophy	Total
1	38	(England)	MF	David Fox	21	2	0	0	23
2	20	(England)	RB	Sean Clohessy	9	0	0	1	10
3	4	(England)	CB	Magnus Okuonghae	6	1	1	0	8
4	8	(England)	MF	Alex Gilbey	5	0	0	0	5
5	42	(England)	CF	Chris Porter	1	0	0	0	1
				Not recorded	4	0	0	0	4
				TOTALS	46	3	1	1	51

=== Clean sheets ===
Number of games goalkeepers kept a clean sheet.

Place	Number	Nationality	Player	League One	FA Cup	League Cup	Football League Trophy	Total
1	1	(England)	Sam Walker	11	1	0	0	12
			TOTALS	11	1	0	0	12

=== Player debuts ===
Players making their first-team Colchester United debut in a fully competitive match.

Number	Position	Nationality	Player	Date	Opponent	Ground	Notes
3	LB	(England)	Ben Gordon	9 August 2014	Oldham Athletic	Colchester Community Stadium	
10	FW	(England)	Dan Holman	9 August 2014	Oldham Athletic	Colchester Community Stadium	
20	RB	(England)	Sean Clohessy	9 August 2014	Oldham Athletic	Colchester Community Stadium	
24	MF	(England)	George Moncur	9 August 2014	Oldham Athletic	Colchester Community Stadium	
12	GK	(England)	Chris Lewington	12 August 2014	Charlton Athletic	The Valley	
36	ST	(England)	Dominic Smith	6 September 2014	Walsall	Bescot Stadium	
16	MF	(England)	Byron Lawrence	16 September 2016	Sheffield United	Colchester Community Stadium	
19	FW	(England)	Rhys Healey	27 September 2014	Crewe Alexandra	Gresty Road	
39	RB	(Wales)	Elliott Hewitt	7 October 2014	Gillingham	Colchester Community Stadium	
38	MF	(England)	David Fox	11 October 2014	Fleetwood Town	Colchester Community Stadium	(Note: Second debut for the club)
39	MF	(England)	Kemar Roofe	9 November 2014	Gosport Borough	Privett Park	
35	DF	(Republic of Ireland)	Michael O'Donoghue	14 November 2014	Barnsley	Oakwell	
41	RB	(Wales)	Elliott Hewitt	14 November 2014	Barnsley	Oakwell	
24	MF	(England)	George Moncur	22 November 2014	Coventry City	Colchester Community Stadium	
42	DF	(England)	Cole Kpekawa	22 November 2014	Coventry City	Colchester Community Stadium	
40	CB/RB	(Northern Ireland)	Jamie Harney	29 November 2014	Milton Keynes Dons	Stadium MK	
43	DF/DM	(United States)	Will Packwood	29 November 2014	Milton Keynes Dons	Stadium MK	
13	CB	(Latvia)	Kaspars Gorkšs	7 December 2014	Peterborough United	Colchester Community Stadium	
32	MF	(England)	Tom Lapslie	2 January 2015	Cardiff City	Cardiff City Stadium	
37	MF/WG	(England)	Dion Sembie-Ferris	2 January 2015	Cardiff City	Cardiff City Stadium	
2	DF	(England)	Alex Wynter	10 January 2015	Peterborough United	London Road Stadium	
15	FB	(Guyana)	Matthew Briggs	24 January 2015	Leyton Orient	Colchester Community Stadium	
42	CF	(England)	Chris Porter	24 January 2015	Leyton Orient	Colchester Community Stadium	
11	CF	(England)	Jack Marriott	31 January 2015	Bradford City	Valley Parade	
25	MF/WG	(Republic of Ireland)	Kenny McEvoy	10 February 2015	Sheffield United	Bramall Lane	
5	DF	(England)	Karleigh Osborne	28 February 2015	Doncaster Rovers	Keepmoat Stadium	
25	MF/WG	(England)	Jacob Murphy	14 March 2015	Crawley Town	Colchester Community Stadium	
6	CB	(South Africa)	Bongani Khumalo	17 March 2015	Yeovil Town	Colchester Community Stadium	
31	FB	(England)	Richard Brindley	3 April 2015	Port Vale	Vale Park	

== Honours and awards ==
Players to receive awards at the club's End of Season Awards Dinner held on 8 May 2015.

Award	Player	Notes
Colchester United Player of the Year award	(England) Tom Eastman	
Young Player of the Year award	(England) Sammie Szmodics	
Players' Player of the Year award	(England) Gavin Massey	
Community Player of the Year award	(England) Frankie Kent	
Colchester United Supporters Association Home Player of the Year award	(England) Tom Eastman	
Colchester United Supporters Association Away Player of the Year award	(England) Tom Eastman	
Goal of the Season award	(England) Drey Wright	v Gillingham, 7 October 2014

== See also ==
- List of Colchester United F.C. seasons
