= David Fox (footballer) =

British footballer (born 1983)

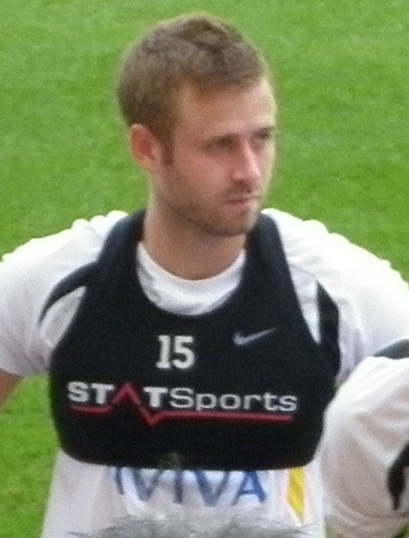

Personal information
- Full name: David Lee Fox
- Date of birth: 13 December 1983 (age 42)
- Place of birth: Leek, Staffordshire, England
- Height: 1.75 m (5 ft 9 in)
- Position: Midfielder

Team information
- Current team: Plymouth Argyle (head of football operations)

Youth career
- ?–2000: Exeter City
- 2000–2002: Manchester United

Senior career*
Years	Team	Apps	(Gls)
2002–2006	Manchester United	0	(0)
2003–2004	→ Royal Antwerp (loan)	0	(0)
2004	→ Shrewsbury Town (loan)	4	(1)
2006–2009	Blackpool	94	(6)
2009–2010	Colchester United	18	(3)
2010–2014	Norwich City	62	(1)
2013	→ Barnsley (loan)	7	(0)
2014–2015	Colchester United	30	(2)
2015–2016	Crewe Alexandra	39	(2)
2016–2019	Plymouth Argyle	128	(2)
Total		382	(17)

International career
1999	England U16	1	(0)
2000	England U17	2	(0)
2002	England U19	1	(0)
2002–2003	England U20	9	(0)
- * Club domestic league appearances and goals as of 19:54, 5 May 2019 (UTC)

David Lee Fox (born 13 December 1983) is an English former footballer who played as a midfielder. He is head of football operations at Plymouth Argyle.

Born in Leek, Staffordshire, Fox began his career with Exeter City, where his father Peter was player-manager, before joining Manchester United in July 2000. However, he was unable to break into the first-team and spent time on loan with Belgian club Royal Antwerp and Shrewsbury Town before making a permanent transfer to Blackpool in 2006. After three years with Blackpool, he joined Colchester United in 2009, before moving to Norwich City a year later. In 2013, he went on a three-month loan to Barnsley, before he rejoined Colchester in late 2014. He has also played for the England Under-20s.

== Club career ==
=== Manchester United ===
Born in Leek, Staffordshire, Fox is the son of former footballer Peter Fox, who was playing as a goalkeeper for Stoke City at the time of David's birth. After Peter signed for Exeter City in 1993, the family moved to Devon and David joined the club's youth system. In April 2000, Fox was invited to play for Manchester United's under-17s side at the Nivea Junior Football Tournament in Bludenz, Austria, where he played in four of the five matches. In July 2000, shortly after his father's departure from Exeter, Fox signed a trainee contract with Manchester United, before signing his first professional contract on 13 December 2000, his 17th birthday.

In his first season with Manchester United, Fox was a regular in the under-17s, playing in 26 out of a possible 27 matches in the FA Premier Academy League and scoring seven goals. He also made one appearance in the FA Youth Cup, coming on as a substitute for Gary Sampson in the 8–0 fourth-round win over Scunthorpe United, as well as making his debut for the under-19s in a 2–1 defeat away to Wrexham on 17 March 2001. In 2001–02, he made the permanent step up to the under-19s, appearing in 25 of a possible 28 league matches and scoring three goals, as well as appearing in all four FA Youth Cup matches. He got his first taste of reserve team football early in the season, appearing in three friendlies before making his first competitive appearance as a substitute for Phil Neville in a 1–0 league win at home to Aston Villa on 25 October 2001. After a further five substitute appearances for the reserves, he made his first start in the 2–1 defeat away to Oldham Athletic in the Manchester Senior Cup on 11 March 2002, before following it up with another start in a 2–0 away win over Sheffield Wednesday in the FA Premier Reserve League, in which Manchester United finished as champions.

Fox began the 2002–03 season in the under-19s, but began playing more for the reserves towards the end of the season, ultimately playing 20 times for the under-19s and 18 times for the reserves, including three more appearances in the Manchester Senior Cup. On 14 April 2003, Fox was one of only two scorers in a penalty shoot-out against Bury in the Manchester Senior Cup, which Manchester United won 2–0 after a 2–2 draw in normal time. The following season, he was farmed out on loan for six months to Manchester United's Belgian feeder club, Royal Antwerp, where he made 11 appearances, all in friendlies. He returned to Manchester United in January 2004, and made nine more appearances for the reserve team before the end of the season, including the final of the Manchester Senior Cup, in which Manchester United beat Manchester City 3–2 to win the cup.

In pre-season ahead of the 2004–05 campaign, Fox was named in the Manchester United first team for a friendly against Burnley for Stan Ternent's testimonial; with Manchester United 3–1 up in the 68th minute, Fox was brought on in place of defender Jonathan Spector to make his first-team debut. After seven matches of the reserves' season, on 7 October 2004, Fox was signed on a one-month loan by League Two side Shrewsbury Town. He made his professional debut the next day in a 1–0 defeat at home to Rushden & Diamonds, and scored his first goal in his second game, a 4–1 defeat at Leyton Orient a week later. He made two more appearances for Shrewsbury before returning to Manchester United in November 2004. On his return, Fox was made captain of the reserves, and led the team to victory in the Premier Reserve League, The Central League First Division West, and the Central League Cup, as well as the final of the Manchester Senior Cup, in which they lost 3–2 to Manchester City.

=== Blackpool ===
Fox continued in the Manchester United reserve team at the start of the 2005–06 season, but at the age of 22 and having failed to break into the first team, he was allowed to join League One side Blackpool on a free transfer in January 2006. He scored his first goal for the Seasiders on 4 February 2006, in a 2–2 draw against Nottingham Forest at Bloomfield Road.

On 9 June 2009, Fox was one of eight Blackpool players released by new manager Ian Holloway. He joined Colchester United on 1 July.

=== Colchester United ===
Fox made his debut for Colchester in the opening game of the season on 8 August 2009, in their 7–1 away victory over Norwich City, in which he scored direct from a free-kick. Fox added a second goal to his tally for Colchester on his home debut Against Yeovil. His third goal came in the 2–2 draw against Oldham Athletic.

=== Norwich City ===
After one season at Colchester, Fox agreed to sign for Norwich on 2 June 2010 on a two-year deal and was given the squad number 15. Initially used as a substitute, Fox became a regular selection in midfield. He scored his first goal for Norwich in the 1–1 draw at Millwall. In the 2011–12 season, Fox came third in the voting Norwich's player of the season award for consistently good performances throughout the club's return to the Premier League. However, Fox fell out of favour under new Norwich manager Chris Hughton and rarely featured in the 2012–13 season. Despite this, in September 2012 it was announced that he had signed an extension to his contract — extending it until summer 2014, with the option of a further year.

==== Loan to Barnsley ====
On 27 September 2013, it was announced that Fox had joined Championship side Barnsley on a 93-day emergency loan. Fox played against Leicester City the following day, starting seven consecutive games until he contracted mumps. His last game for Barnsley before returning to Norwich was on 9 November.

=== Return to Colchester United ===
Following his release from Norwich, Fox had an unsuccessful period training with League One side Preston North End, before rejoining his former club Colchester United on trial. After impressing Colchester manager Tony Humes, Fox signed a three-month contract with the club on 6 October 2014. He made his second debut for the club on 11 October, starting in the U's first home win of the season as they defeated Fleetwood Town 2–1 at the Community Stadium. He extended his stay with the U's on 8 January, signing a six-month contract to see him remain until the summer of 2015. Fox scored the first goal of his second stint with the club from a free kick in Colchester's 3–2 defeat to Crawley Town on 14 March. He then scored in the next match against Yeovil Town, converting a penalty after Jacob Murphy had been fouled by Nathan Smith. After making 33 appearances during the season and with his contract expiring in the summer, Fox decided not to take up a contract offer by Colchester in order to move closer to his family in the North West of England.

=== Crewe Alexandra ===
After his decision to leave Colchester United, Fox signed a one-year deal with Crewe Alexandra on 14 July 2015.

=== Plymouth Argyle ===
On 22 July 2016, David signed for Football League Two club Plymouth Argyle . Fox scored his first goal for Plymouth in an FA Cup tie against Mansfield Town on 5 November 2016.

He was offered a new contract by Plymouth at the end of the 2017–18 season, and again at the end of the 2018–19 season, but rejected the second in favour of a move closer to home. He later joined his brother at Leek County School Old Boys in the Staffordshire County Senior League.

== International career ==
Fox played for England Under-20s in the 2003 FIFA World Youth Championship.

== Post-playing career ==
In May 2025, Fox returned to Plymouth Argyle as head of football operations. He had previously held the role of loans manager at both Huddersfield Town and Leicester City.

== Career statistics ==
As of match played 21 June 2018

Appearances and goals by club, season and competition
Club	Season	League			FA Cup		League Cup		Other		Total	
Club	Season	Division	Apps	Goals	Apps	Goals	Apps	Goals	Apps	Goals	Apps	Goals
Manchester United	2004–05	Premier League	0	0	0	0	0	0	–		0	0
Manchester United	2005–06	Premier League	0	0	0	0	0	0	–		0	0
Shrewsbury Town (loan)	2004–05	League Two	4	1	0	0	0	0	1 (Note: Appearance(s) in Football League Trophy)	0	5	1
Blackpool	2005–06	League One	7	1	0	0	0	0	0	0	7	1
Blackpool	2006–07	League One	37	4	5	0	1	0	2 (Note: Appearance(s) in Football League play-offs)	0	45	4
Blackpool	2007–08	Championship	28	1	1	1	4	0	0	0	33	2
Blackpool	2008–09	Championship	22	0	1	0	0	0	0	0	23	0
Colchester United	2009–10	League One	18	3	2	0	0	0	1	0	21	3
Norwich City	2010–11	Championship	32	1	1	0	2	0	0	0	35	1
Norwich City	2011–12	Premier League	28	0	3	0	1	0	–		32	0
Norwich City	2012–13	Premier League	2	0	2	0	3	0	–		7	0
Norwich City	2013–14	Premier League	0	0	2	0	0	0	0	0	2	0
Barnsley (loan)	2013–14	Championship	7	0	0	0	0	0	0	0	7	0
Colchester United	2014–15	League One	30	2	3	0	0	0	1	0	34	2
Crewe Alexandra	2015–16	League One	39	2	0	0	1	0	1	0	41	2
Plymouth Argyle	2016–17	League Two	40	0	5	1	1	0	1	0	47	1
Plymouth Argyle	2017–18	League One	45	1	2	0	0	0	1	0	48	1
Career total			339	16	27	1	13	0	4	0	387	18

== Honours ==
Blackpool

- Football League One play-offs: 2007

== Personal life ==
Fox's father is the former Stoke City goalkeeper and Exeter City player-manager Peter Fox. His brother, Mark, played for Leek CSOB.
