= Dominic Smith (footballer, born 1995) =

English footballer

Personal information
- Full name: Dominic Rooney Smith
- Date of birth: 22 September 1995 (age 31)
- Place of birth: Crewe, England
- Height: 1.91 m (6 ft 3 in)
- Position: Forward

Team information
- Current team: Trafford

Youth career
- –2014: Crewe Alexandra
- 2014: Colchester United

Senior career*
Years	Team	Apps	(Gls)
2014–2015	Colchester United	1	(0)
2015	→ Hornchurch (loan)	2	(0)
2015	Newcastle Town	2	(3)
2015–2016	Droylsden		
2016	Radcliffe Borough		
2016	Trafford	5	(2)
2016–2017	Burscough		
2017–2020	Droylsden		
- * Club domestic league appearances and goals

Dominic Rooney Smith (born 22 September 1995) is an English footballer who plays as a forward for Northern Premier League North Division side Droylsden. He began his career with Crewe Alexandra, where he progressed through the club's Academy, but failed to make a first team appearance. He joined Colchester United in 2014, where he made his Football League debut in September 2014. He had a brief loan spell at A.F.C. Hornchurch, before leaving Colchester after the expiry of his one-year deal. He has since represented numerous Northern Premier League sides, including Newcastle Town, Radcliffe Borough, Trafford, Burscough and Droylsden on two occasions.

== Career ==
Born in Crewe, Smith began his playing career with hometown club Crewe Alexandra, progressing through the age groups at Academy level, but failed to step-up to the first-team. He was released by the club in 2014, but soon after joined Colchester United's Academy on trial. He featured in the under-18 sides Youth Alliance Cup Final victory against Bradford City as a second-half substitute, and helped the club to the Youth Alliance South East title. He then signed a one-year professional development contract for with Colchester on 14 May 2014.

While Smith had been signed to primarily feature for Colchester's under-21 development squad, coach Richard Hall set him the target of achieving first-team football during his time with the U's. He scored a number of goals in pre-season for the club, including a brace against Brantham Athletic in a 4–1 win on 16 July, and a hat-trick in a 6–4 win over Southend United on 5 August. Following Joe Dunne's dismissal as first-team manager, Academy manager Tony Humes stepped up as a replacement, and subsequently named Smith in his squad to face Walsall on 6 September. He was sent on as a 77th-minute substitute for Gavin Massey to make his professional debut in a match which finished 0–0, the clubs first clean sheet of the season and only their second point in six games.

Smith was loaned to A.F.C. Hornchurch in January 2015, joining fellow Colchester development player Billy Roast at Hornchurch Stadium for one month. He made his debut on New Years Day in the Urchins' 2–0 win over Grays Athletic, playing 61 minutes before being substituted. He also appeared as a substitute in Hornchurch's 2–0 defeat at Maidstone United on 17 January, replacing Tobi Joseph after 78 minutes.

Following the expiry of his one-year contract with Colchester, Smith was released from the club on 5 May 2015.

Smith joined Northern Premier League Division One South side Newcastle Town in July 2015 where he scored three times in two games. He was then signed by Northern Premier League Division One North outfit Droylsden on 29 September. Smith later joined Division One North side Radcliffe Borough on 10 March 2016, before making a move to league rivals Trafford two weeks later. He joined Burscough in 2016 and made a return to Droylsden in 2017.

== Honours ==
Colchester United U18

- 2013–14 Football League Youth Alliance South East winner
- 2013–14 Football League Youth Alliance Cup winner

All honours referenced by:
