= Will Packwood =

American soccer player (born 1993)

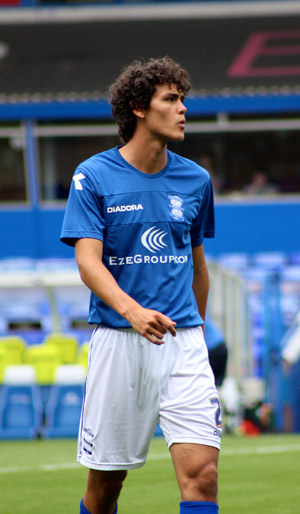
- Packwood with Birmingham City in 2012 pre-season

Personal information
- Full name: William James Packwood
- Date of birth: May 21, 1993 (age 33)
- Place of birth: Concord, Massachusetts, United States
- Height: 6 ft 4 in (1.93 m)
- Positions: Defender; defensive midfielder

Youth career
- 2007–2011: Birmingham City

Senior career*
Years	Team	Apps	(Gls)
2011–2015	Birmingham City	18	(0)
2013	→ Bristol Rovers (loan)	8	(0)
2014	→ Colchester United (loan)	1	(0)
2015	→ Cheltenham Town (loan)	5	(1)
Total		32	(1)

International career
2009	United States U17	3	(0)
2011	United States U18	5	(0)
2010–2013	United States U20	9	(0)
2014–2015	United States U23	9	(1)
- * Club domestic league appearances and goals

William James Packwood (born May 21, 1993) is an American former professional soccer player who played as a defender or defensive midfielder.

Packwood joined the youth academy at English club Birmingham City in 2007 at the age of 14. He made his first-team debut in August 2012 in the Football League Cup, and played in several Football League Championship matches before suffering a severe leg injury in January 2013 which kept out of soccer for several months. After his recovery he spent time on loan to League Two club Bristol Rovers, and in the 2014–15 season had loan spells with League One club Colchester United and League Two Cheltenham Town, both of which ended early due to injury. He was not offered a new deal at the end of that season, and his contract was terminated early to allow him to return to the United States.

Packwood represented the United States in international soccer at levels up to under-23.

== Early life ==
Packwood was born in Concord, Massachusetts, to an English father and an American mother. He attended the Nashoba Brooks School and the Fenn School prior to moving to England in August 2007, where he attended Bromsgrove School.

== Club career ==
Packwood joined Birmingham City's youth academy in August 2007, at age 14 years. He progressed through the academy teams, playing for the U18s and Reserves while still a schoolboy, and eventually captaining the U18s in the 2010–11 season. In July 2011, Packwood signed his first professional contract, a two-year contract expiring in July 2013.

In the absence through injury of Stephen Carr and Jonathan Spector, Packwood made his first-team debut on August 14, 2012, starting at right-back in the first round League Cup match against Barnet. He kept his place for the opening match of the 2012–13 Football League season, a 1–1 draw at home to Charlton Athletic. During the second half of an FA Cup tie at Leeds United on January 5, 2013, Packwood was carried from the field having sustained multiple fractures to his tibia and fibula after landing awkwardly from an apparently innocuous aerial challenge. He underwent three surgical procedures in the days after the injury, and his recovery time was estimated at between nine and twelve months. Despite his injury, Packwood's contract was extended for a further year, until the summer of 2014.

Packwood returned to competitive action after less than eight months out, playing the first half of Birmingham's Professional Development League match on August 26. He played a few more times for the development squad, and on October 17 joined League Two (fourth-tier) Bristol Rovers on loan for a month, to improve his match fitness. He made his debut two days later, winning the man-of-the-match award, in a 1–0 loss at home to Wycombe Wanderers. After four matches – he missed Rovers' FA Cup win because Birmingham did not want him cup-tied – the loan was extended until January 11, 2014, on condition that he could be recalled at 24 hours' notice. He played four more matches before Birmingham lost left-back Mitch Hancox to injury, and with fellow defenders Paul Robinson and Dan Burn nearing possible suspensions, Packwood was recalled on December 11.

He returned to Birmingham's first team on January 25, winning the man-of-the-match award in a 2–1 home loss against Swansea City in the fourth round of the FA Cup. He became a regular selection at center-back, and his performances earned him the award of Football League Young Player of the Month for February 2014.

Packwood signed a new one-year contract with the option of a further year, on June 26, 2014. He made his first appearance of the 2014–15 season on September 30, as a second-half substitute in Birmingham's 3–1 win away to Millwall. This was his last first-team outing before joining League One club Colchester United on November 24, on loan until January 1, 2015. He went straight into the starting eleven for the visit to Milton Keynes Dons, and was sent off for bringing down Benik Afobe to concede a penalty, which was converted for the fifth goal of a 6–0 defeat. A groin injury sustained while committing the foul meant the loan spell was cut short.

With several defenders ahead of him in the pecking order, Packwood joined League Two club Cheltenham Town on March 11 on loan until the end of the season. Birmingham manager Gary Rowett intended the loan spell as an opportunity for the player to earn a new contract. Packwood impressed on debut in a 1–1 draw away to Newport County, and was the Gloucestershire Echo's star man for the next match, a 2–2 draw at Portsmouth, showing "maturity beyond his years and a terrific defensive display capped with a first senior goal": he found space in the penalty area to score with a glancing header from Matt Richards' free kick. He made five appearances before a pulled hamstring ruled him out for the remainder of the season.

Birmingham chose not to take up their option to extend Packwood's contract for another year, and confirmed that he would be released when it expired. The contract was terminated in early May, to allow him to return to the United States to trial with the New England Revolution of Major League Soccer. It was later announced on May 18, 2015, that the Revolution would not sign Packwood, after he trained for two weeks with the club.

== International career ==
In 2009, Packwood was a member of the United States under-17 national team that participated in the FIFA U-17 World Cup in Nigeria. He played for the under-20 national team at the Dallas Cup in March 2010, on a tour to Uruguay and Chile in June 2012 and at the Marbella Cup in October 2012. Packwood was also part of the United States under-18 team for the Milk Cup in Northern Ireland in July 2011.

Packwood received his first call up to the senior squad for a March 5, 2014, friendly against Ukraine, but he and Birmingham teammate Jonathan Spector remained unused substitutes as the United States lost 2–0. He played for the United States under-23 team in a friendly against the Bahamas senior squad in August 2014, and twice more in the following March, against the Bosnia and Herzegovina and Denmark under-21 teams, as part of their buildup to the 2016 Olympics.

== Post-retirement ==
Following his retirement from soccer, Packwood attended Boston College. Since 2021 he has worked for private equity firm Hellman & Friedman, having previously worked as an investment banking analyst for Goldman Sachs.

== Career statistics ==
Appearances and goals by club, season and competition
Club	Season	League			FA Cup		League Cup		Other		Total	
Club	Season	Division	Apps	Goals	Apps	Goals	Apps	Goals	Apps	Goals	Apps	Goals
Birmingham City	2012–13	Championship	5	0	1	0	1	0	—		7	0
Birmingham City	2013–14	Championship	12	0	1	0	0	0	—		13	0
Birmingham City	2014–15	Championship	1	0	0	0	0	0	—		1	0
Birmingham City	Total		18	0	2	0	1	0	—		21	0
Bristol Rovers (loan)	2013–14	League Two	8	0	—		—		—		8	0
Colchester United (loan)	2014–15	League One	1	0	0	0	—		—		1	0
Cheltenham Town (loan)	2014–15	League Two	5	1	—		—		—		5	1
Career total			32	1	2	0	1	0	—		35	1
