= Tony Humes =

English footballer

Personal information
- Full name: Anthony Humes
- Date of birth: 19 March 1966 (age 60)
- Place of birth: Blyth, Northumberland, England
- Height: 1.80 m (5 ft 11 in)
- Position: Defender

Youth career
- 1982–1986: Ipswich Town

Senior career*
Years	Team	Apps	(Gls)
1985–1992	Ipswich Town	120	(10)
1992–1999	Wrexham	209	(9)
Total		329	(19)

Managerial career
- 2014–2015: Colchester United
- * Club domestic league appearances and goals

Anthony Humes (born 19 March 1966) is an English football manager and former professional footballer who was recently director of football at English club Colchester United.

Humes played as a defender in the Football League for Ipswich Town between 1985 and 1992, and Wrexham between 1992 and 1999. He remained with Wrexham following his retirement from playing in 1999, remaining with the club until 2001. He returned to Ipswich as a youth coach in the same year, before being promoted to Academy manager. He remained in this position until 2009, when he left following an internal review of the club's youth setup.

Humes joined Colchester United's Centre of Excellence in the summer of 2009, and remained in the same position for five years, helping guide the U's under-18 team to a league and cup double during the 2013–14 season. Following Joe Dunne's departure as Colchester United manager in September 2014, Humes was promoted to first-team manager. After helping the club stave off relegation on the final day of the 2014–15 season, he was dismissed as manager on 26 November 2015 following a string of four back-to-back defeats, leaving the club one point above the League One relegation zone. In March 2016, Humes made a return to Colchester as director of football.

It was confirmed at the end of the 2022/23 season that Humes had left Colchester United.

== Playing career ==
Born in Blyth, Northumberland, Humes began his career with Ipswich Town, where he made his professional debut as a substitute for Mick Stockwell in a 0–0 Second Division draw with Blackburn Rovers at Ewood Park on 29 November 1986. He scored his first goal for Town in the Full Members Cup as Ipswich defeated Manchester City 3–2 in the fourth round on 31 January 1987. His first league goals followed in a game against Leeds United at Elland Road on 18 April 1987, scoring twice in the 3–2 defeat. He made 120 league appearances for the club between 1985 and 1992, scoring 10 goals. He played his final game for the club on 17 September 1991, a 1–1 draw with Newcastle United in a match in which Humes broke his arm.

Following his recovery from injury, Humes failed to break into the Ipswich first-team, and was sold to Wrexham on 27 March 1992 for £40,000. Between 1992 and 1999, Humes made 209 league appearances for the Dragons, where he was also club captain. During his time at Wrexham, Humes won the Welsh Cup in 1995 and he gained promotion from Division 4 to Division 3 in the 1992/3 season.

== Managerial career ==
Humes remained with Wrexham following his retirement from playing in 1999, and by 2001, Humes had been named as the club's Academy director. He left his role in August 2001, when he re-joined Ipswich Town's Academy. He was promoted to the position of Academy manager in 2006 and remained in the role until 2009. Humes left his role in January 2009, before joining Colchester United as head of youth in June 2009.

With Colchester, Humes helped to prepare Colchester's youth players for first-team action, with players such as Alex Gilbey, Sammie Szmodics, Tosin Olufemi and Freddie Ladapo all making their professional debuts in Joe Dunne's first-team squad under Humes' stewardship. During the 2013–14 season, Humes oversaw Colchester United's under-18 squad as they won the South East Youth Alliance league and the national Youth Alliance Cup.

Following Colchester United's poor run of form in League One at the beginning of the 2014–15 season, it was announced on 1 September 2014 that Humes had replaced Joe Dunne as first-team manager after Dunne had left the club by mutual consent. His first game in charge was a 0–0 stalemate against Walsall at the Bescot Stadium on 6 September 2014, leading his side to their first clean sheet of the season. He oversaw his first victory of the season in only his second game in charge, a 2–0 away win against Leyton Orient on 13 September. Humes led the club to League One safety on the final day of the 2014–15 season. With Colchester needing results to go for them elsewhere, including either Crawley Town and Notts County to not win, or one of Crawley or Notts County to win and the other to lose alongside Crewe Alexandra, while beating promotion hopefuls Preston North End, who needed a win to guarantee promotion to the Championship. Colchester defeated their opponents 1–0 at the Colchester Community Stadium in a hard-fought match that meant they survived for another season by two points.

Humes led Colchester to an unbeaten September 2015 following a winless start to the season. He guided his side to eighth position in League One by the end of September, which resulted in a nomination for League One Manager of the Month on 7 October. He faced competition from Bury's David Flitcroft, Burton Albion's Jimmy Floyd Hasselbaink and Southend United's Phil Brown. However, after seven defeats in the nine following games, including four back-to-back losses and a defeat to bottom club Crewe Alexandra on 24 November, Humes was dismissed as manager of Colchester United on 26 November, leaving the club one point above the relegation zone.

Humes made a return to Colchester in March 2016 after being appointed in a director of football role. Alongside Tony Ashby, Humes was added to the Colchester United board of directors in March 2017.

On 3 August 2023, Humes resigned from his role as Director of Football but he declined an offer to take a Non Executive Director role at the club.

== Managerial statistics ==
As of match played 24 November 2015.

Team	From	To	Record				
Team	From	To	G	W	D	L	Win %
Colchester United	1 September 2014	26 November 2015	67	22	15	30	32.84
