= Alex Wynter =

English footballer

Personal information
- Full name: Alex James Wynter
- Date of birth: 15 September 1993 (age 33)
- Place of birth: Croydon, England
- Height: 1.85 m (6 ft 1 in)
- Position: Defender

Youth career
- 2003–2010: Crystal Palace

Senior career*
Years	Team	Apps	(Gls)
2010–2015	Crystal Palace	0	(0)
2013	→ Eastbourne Borough (loan)	6	(0)
2014	→ Sutton United (loan)	6	(0)
2014	→ Colchester United (loan)	6	(1)
2014	→ Portsmouth (loan)	10	(0)
2015–2017	Colchester United	45	(0)
2017–2018	Maidstone United	41	(5)
2018–2022	Eastleigh	73	(5)
2022–2023	Eastbourne Borough	13	(1)

International career^{‡}
2017	England C	1	(0)
- * Club domestic league appearances and goals as of 17:08, 12 November 2022 (UTC) ‡ National team caps and goals as of 20:13, 28 November 2017 (UTC)

Alex James Wynter (born 15 September 1993) is an English professional footballer who most recently played as a defender for National League South club Eastbourne Borough.

Wynter had progressed through the youth system at Crystal Palace since the age of nine, where he made two cup appearances. He had loan spells at Eastbourne Borough, Sutton United, Colchester United and Portsmouth, before joining Colchester on a permanent basis in January 2015. He joined Eastleigh in July 2018, following an impressive season at Maidstone United.

== Career ==
=== Early career ===
Born in Croydon, Wynter joined the Crystal Palace Academy at the age of nine whilst he was attending Davidson Primary School based in his hometown. He later attended the Crystal Palace affiliated Oasis Academy Shirley Park between 2005 and 2010, where he was head boy. He made his professional debut whilst studying at Oasis Academy, appearing in the FA Cup while still in year 11. He left the academy with twelve GCSEs, including six at grade A.

Alongside the academy, Wynter regularly featured in the Croydon Schools' team across multiple age groups. He scored hat-tricks against Woking Schools' in a 10–0 win at under-11 level in September 2004, Ashford Schools' in a 5–0 win and Sutton Schools' in a 6–2 win in December 2004, and a further hat-trick against Godalming Schools' in a 7–2 away win in January 2005 as he helped his side to the London School's Shield final. He scored for London Schools' in their 5–1 win over Surrey Schools' to lift the trophy for his side in April 2005.

The following year, Wynter helped the Croydon Schools' under-12s side retain the English Schools' South-East Area Patrick Haugh Trophy after defeating Mid Sussex Schools' 3–1, with Wynter scoring the opening two goals for Croydon Schools'. He also helped his side to retain the Gibson Cup with two goals in their 3–0 win over Woking Schools' in April 2006.

He continued his goalscoring form in the under-13 age group, scoring a hat-trick in the English Schools' Football Association Wimbledon Challenge Trophy against Canterbury Schools' in a 10–0 victory. He later helped his age group to a third consecutive season of success with victory in the Challenge Trophy with a goal in extra time to beat Gravesham Schools', and a hat-trick against Bedford Schools' in the semi-final stage of the Oxford United Invitation Cup in May 2007.

=== Crystal Palace ===
With Crystal Palace struggling financially, and facing an injury crisis with a number of players out on loan, manager Neil Warnock named only four players on the substitutes bench for an FA Cup third round tie away to Sheffield Wednesday on 2 January 2010. This included the 16-year-old Wynter, who was sent on for his debut as a substitute for Darren Ambrose three minutes into stoppage time in the second half. Wynter was then offered a three-year professional deal at Palace in April 2010, alongside Wilfried Zaha and Jonathan Williams.

==== Eastbourne Borough loan ====
On 28 February 2013, Wynter joined Conference South side Eastbourne Borough on loan for an initial one-month deal. He made his debut two days later in Eastbourne's 1–0 defeat at Eastleigh. He made six appearances during his loan spell with the club, which came to an end on 30 March, playing the full 90 minutes in each game.

==== Return to Crystal Palace ====
Wynter was handed his first start for Crystal Palace in a League Cup fixture against Bristol City on 27 August. He was replaced after 68 minutes by Kyle De Silva as the Eagles were defeated 2–1.

==== Sutton United loan ====
On 3 January 2014, Wynter joined Sutton United in a short-term loan deal. He made his debut in Sutton's 2–0 win at Chelmsford City on 11 January, making six appearances for the Conference South side before returning to Crystal Palace following the expiry of his loan.

==== Colchester United loan ====
After returning from his Conference South loan with Sutton, Wynter was quickly signed on loan by League One club Colchester United until the end of the 2013–14 season on 27 March 2014. He made his debut as a second-half substitute for Dominic Vose in the U's 2–1 home defeat to Tranmere Rovers on 5 April. However, for Colchester's trip to Stevenage on 12 April, Joe Dunne handed Wynter a start, as Colchester eased their relegation fears with a 3–2 win, as Stevenage's Filipe Morais was sent off after shoving Wynter. After the match, his performance was described as "exceptional" by Dunne. Wynter then started in all of Colchester's remaining games for the season, including scoring his first professional goal as Colchester sealed their League One status with a 4–1 thrashing of already-promoted Brentford on 26 April. Wynter's goal came after 32 minutes, heading in Ryan Dickson's corner to double the U's advantage. He ended his stay in Essex with six appearances to his name.

Following the expiry of his loan at the end of the season, Colchester expressed an interest in signing Wynter on a permanent basis, but a move did not come to fruition, despite stating himself that he would be happy to return should the opportunity arise.

==== Portsmouth loan ====
Wynter joined League Two Portsmouth in a season-long loan deal in July 2014. He made his debut in Portsmouth's 1–0 win over League One opposition Peterborough United in the League Cup on 12 August, and played in Pompey's 3–1 Football League Trophy triumph over Yeovil Town on 2 September, but didn't make his first league appearance until 7 September, starting in their 2–0 away defeat to Burton Albion.

Wynter was played in a wing-back role by Portsmouth manager Andy Awford, despite never having played in the position before, and said that he was "ready to thrive" in his new position. Following a string of poor performances, Awford scrapped his 3-5-2 system that utilised wing-backs, but did not blame Wynter or his teammates for the lack of function within the system. After making 15 appearances for Portsmouth in all competitions, Awford brought in Gillingham loanee Matt Fish as a replacement for Wynter, but insisted he would remain a part of his squad but the situation would be reassessed in the January transfer window. However, on 28 December, both Fish and Wynter returned to their parent clubs after the loans were not renewed with both players having fallen out of favour at Fratton Park.

=== Colchester United ===
Wynter rejoined Colchester United on 10 January 2015, on this occasion on a permanent basis, signing an 18-month contract ahead of the U's League One game against Peterborough United the same day. He made his second debut for the club later that day, starting in defence and helping his teammates to a clean sheet in a 2–0 victory at London Road.

During Colchester's FA Cup fourth round match against Tottenham Hotspur on 30 January 2016, Wynter was involved in a sickening collision with fellow U's defender Tom Eastman after just two minutes of the game. Wynter suffered concussion and a seizure while on the field. He was taken to hospital, where he was reported to have been sitting up and talking by half-time in the 4–1 defeat for Colchester. He finally made a return to first-team action on 23 April when he came on for Gavin Massey in a tactical substitution following Joe Edwards' dismissal in the 17th minute of the 3–0 defeat to Burton Albion, a result which saw Colchester relegated to League Two.

Despite Colchester suffering relegation to League Two, Wynter signed a two-year contract extension with the club on 27 April 2016. He ended the 2015–16 season with 16 appearances for the U's.

Wynter described the 2016–17 season as not "a great season for me personally", where he had been "mainly on the bench". He played just 20 games across the season, five of which were cup matches.

=== Maidstone United ===
On 4 August 2017, Wynter's contract with Colchester United was cancelled by mutual consent and he opted to join National League side Maidstone United the same day.

=== Eastleigh ===
On 29 June 2018, Wynter agreed to join fellow National League side Eastleigh on a one-year deal following an impressive campaign at Maidstone. Wynter was released at the end of the 2021–22 season.

== Career statistics ==
As of 19 November 2022

Appearances and goals by club, season and competition
Club	Season	League			FA Cup		League Cup		Other		Total	
Club	Season	Division	Apps	Goals	Apps	Goals	Apps	Goals	Apps	Goals	Apps	Goals
Crystal Palace	2009–10	Championship	0	0	1	0	0	0	–		1	0
Crystal Palace	2010–11	Championship	0	0	0	0	0	0	–		0	0
Crystal Palace	2011–12	Championship	0	0	0	0	0	0	–		0	0
Crystal Palace	2012–13	Championship	0	0	0	0	0	0	–		0	0
Crystal Palace	2013–14	Premier League	0	0	0	0	1	0	–		1	0
Crystal Palace	2014–15	Premier League	0	0	0	0	0	0	–		0	0
Crystal Palace	Total		0	0	1	0	1	0	–		2	0
Eastbourne Borough (loan)	2012–13	Conference South	6	0	–		–		–		6	0
Sutton United (loan)	2013–14	Conference South	6	0	–		–		–		6	0
Colchester United (loan)	2013–14	League One	6	1	–		–		–		6	1
Portsmouth (loan)	2014–15	League Two	10	0	2	0	1	0	2 (Note: Appearance(s) in Football League Trophy)	0	15	0
Colchester United	2014–15	League One	18	0	–		–		–		18	0
Colchester United	2015–16	League One	12	0	2	0	1	0	1	0	16	0
Colchester United	2016–17	League Two	15	0	1	0	1	0	3 (Note: Appearance in EFL Trophy)	0	20	0
Colchester United	Total		45	0	3	0	2	0	4	0	54	0
Maidstone United	2017–18	National League	41	5	4	1	–		4 (Note: Appearance(s) in FA Trophy)	0	49	6
Eastleigh	2018–19	National League	43	4	0	0	–		2 (Note: Two appearances in National League play-offs)	0	45	4
Eastleigh	2019–20	National League	11	0	0	0	–		1	0	12	0
Eastleigh	2020–21	National League	19	1	2	0	–		1	0	22	1
Eastleigh	2021–22	National League	0	0	0	0	—		0	0	0	0
Eastleigh	Total		73	5	2	0	0	0	4	0	79	5
Eastbourne Borough	2022–23	National League South	13	1	0	0	—		1	0	14	1
Career total			200	11	12	1	4	0	15	0	231	12
