= Conor Hubble =

English footballer (born 1994)

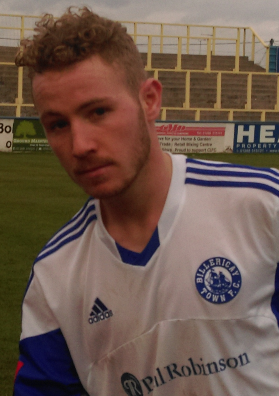
- Conor Hubble playing for Billericay Town in December 2015

Personal information
- Full name: Conor Stephen James Hubble
- Date of birth: 29 November 1994 (age 31)
- Place of birth: Chelmsford, England
- Height: 1.80 m (5 ft 11 in)
- Position: Midfielder

Team information
- Current team: Canvey Island

Youth career
- –2013: Queens Park Rangers

Senior career*
Years	Team	Apps	(Gls)
2013–2015	Colchester United	1	(0)
2014	→ Leiston (loan)	4	(1)
2014	→ Leiston (loan)	4	(1)
2015	Leiston	6	(2)
2015–2017	Billericay Town		
2017	Leiston		
2017–2019	Coggeshall Town		
2019–2020	Maldon & Tiptree	19	(4)
2020–2025	Canvey Island	156	(33)
2025	Stanway Rovers	14	(1)
2025–	Canvey Island	1	(1)
- * Club domestic league appearances and goals as of 18:33, 3 December 2025 (UTC)

Conor Stephen James Hubble (born 29 November 1994) is an English footballer who plays as a midfielder for Isthmian League North Division club Canvey Island. He came through the youth ranks at Queens Park Rangers, before joining Colchester United's Academy, where he made his Football League debut in 2013. He had two loan spells at Leiston before joining permanently in 2015 following his release from Colchester. He then joined Billericay Town in the summer of 2015.

== Career ==
Hailing from Chelmsford, Hubble began his career at Queens Park Rangers, where he served his apprenticeship. After being told he would not be retained at QPR, he went on trial with Colchester United's Academy in the latter half of the 2012–13 season, featuring in a number of games for the under-21 development squad at the age of 18.

An attack-minded midfielder, Hubble was signed by Colchester on 2 July 2013 to link up with the club's under-21 team. He featured in a number of first-team pre-season friendlies in preparation for the 2013–14 season, scoring in the U's 2–1 friendly victory against Bury Town on 24 July.

Hubble made his professional and Football League debut on 21 September 2013, coming on as an 84th-minute substitute for Colchester's on-loan winger Jeffrey Monakana in a 1–1 draw with Crawley Town at the Colchester Community Stadium.

On 11 January 2014, Hubble and fellow Colchester academy player Jack Simmons joined Leiston for a one-month loan period, linking up with former U's player and academy coach Steve Ball. He made his debut for the club the same day as a substitute for Simmons, coming on after 60 minutes in a 2–2 draw with Lewes. He also made appearances in away wins at Wingate & Finchley and Canvey Island. He then scored in a 2–0 away victory at Bury Town on 4 February.

Hubble had a further loan at Leiston during the 2014–15 season, making his second debut on 25 October and grabbing himself a goal in their 3–2 victory over Bognor Regis Town. He grabbed an assist and the man of the match honours three days later as Leiston defeated Grays Athletic 3–0. He also made three appearances in the qualifying rounds of the FA Trophy, providing an assist in the 2–2 draw with Leighton Town on 1 November, netting in the 5–2 replay win on 4 November, and providing another assist in the 3–2 win over Paulton Rovers on 15 November. He featured in Leiston's 3–1 league win over Canvey Island on 8 November, and made his final appearance in a 2–0 win against Wingate & Finchley, providing the assists for both goals.

On 19 March 2015, Hubble was released by mutual consent from his Colchester United contract. He joined Leiston on a permanent basis, making a goalscoring debut on 28 March in a 2–1 win over Tonbridge Angels. He made six appearances until the end of the season for the club, playing in defeats to Leatherhead and Bury Town, and he scored a stoppage time equaliser in a 2–2 draw with Bognor Regis Town on 11 April. Hubble provided an assist for Leiston's goal in the 1–1 draw with Canvey Island on 18 April, and provided another assist in their 2–1 defeat to Hendon in their final game of the season on 25 April, earning himself the 'Player of the Match' award.

Ahead of the 2015–16 Isthmian League season, Hubble joined Billericay Town on 11 August 2015. He rejoined Leiston in January 2017. He subsequently joined Coggeshall Town in the summer. In October 2019, Hubble signed for Maldon & Tiptree, making 19 league appearances, scoring four goals. In August 2020, Hubble signed for Canvey Island.

In June 2025, Hubble joined Isthmian League North Division club Stanway Rovers, being named vice-captain ahead of the 2025–26 season. On 30 November 2025, he returned to Canvey Island.

== Career statistics ==
As of match played 25 April 2015.

Appearances and goals by club, season and competition
Club	Season	League			FA Cup		League Cup		Other		Total	
Club	Season	Division	Apps	Goals	Apps	Goals	Apps	Goals	Apps	Goals	Apps	Goals
Colchester United	2013–14	League One	1	0	0	0	0	0	0	0	1	0
Colchester United	2014–15	League One	0	0	0	0	0	0	0	0	0	0
Colchester United	Total		1	0	0	0	0	0	0	0	1	0
Leiston (loan)	2013–14	Isthmian League Premier Division	4	1	0	0	0	0	0	0	4	1
Leiston (loan)	2014–15	Isthmian League Premier Division	4	1	0	0	0	0	3 (Note: Appearance(s) in FA Trophy)	1	7	2
Leiston	2014–15	Isthmian League Premier Division	6	2	0	0	0	0	0	0	6	2
Career total			15	4	0	0	0	0	3	1	18	5
