= Mason Spence =

Footballer (born 2003)

Mason Kendall Spence
Personal information
- Full name: Mason Kendle Spence
- Date of birth: 20 November 1994 (age 31)
- Place of birth: Milton Keynes, England
- Position: Full-back

Team information
- Current team: Stotfold

Youth career
- 2011–2013: Milton Keynes Dons

Senior career*
| Years | Team | Apps | (Gls) |
| 2012–2013 | Milton Keynes Dons | 0 | (0) |
| 2013–2014 | Colchester United | 1 | (0) |
| 2014 | → Concord Rangers (loan) | 2 | (0) |
| 2014 | St Neots Town | 16 | (0) |
| 2014 | Stony Stratford Town | 2 | (1) |
| 2014–2015 | Hayes & Yeading United | 11 | (0) |
| 2015 | Chelmsford City | 8 | (2) |
| 2015 | Dunstable Town | 6 | (0) |
| 2015–2016 | Hayes & Yeading United | 14 | (0) |
| 2016–2017 | Hitchin Town | 35 | (1) |
| 2016 | → Arlesey Town (loan) | ? | (?) |
| 2017–2018 | Cambridge City | 18 | (1) |
| 2018–2019 | Kempston Rovers | 11 | (1) |
| 2019 | Barton Rovers | 8 | (0) |
| 2019–2020 | Milton Keynes Robins | 16 | (14) |
| 2020–2022 | Milton Keynes Irish | 19 | (20) |
| 2022–2023 | Stotfold | 44 | (11) |
| 2023– | Milton Keynes Irish | 80 | (46) |

International career
| 2012 | Wales U19 | 1 | (0) |
- * Club domestic league appearances and goals as of 14 May 2018

Mason Kendle Spence (born 21 November 1994) is a footballer who plays as a full-back for Kempston Rovers. Born in England, he made one appearance for the Welsh U19 national team.

== Club career ==
=== Milton Keynes Dons ===
Born in Milton Keynes, Spence started his career in the youth team of local club Milton Keynes Dons where he was captain, signing his first professional contract in May 2011. He made his professional debut on 4 September 2012, in a 1–0 defeat to Northampton Town in the Football League Trophy. In April 2013, Spence was released by the club after making just one first team appearance.

=== Colchester United ===
Spence joined Colchester United's Academy, initially on trial at the end of the 2012–13 season, playing in a number of under-21 games for the club. He then signed a one-year contract in June 2013. He made his U's and Football League debut as a substitute for Ryan Dickson after just 20 minutes of an injury-ravaged Colchester's 2–0 defeat to Coventry City on 8 September.

On 14 January 2014, Spence joined Conference South side Concord Rangers on a one-month loan deal, making his debut as a 30th-minute substitute for Jack Lampe in the side's 2–1 victory over table-topping Bromley and providing the assist for Rangers' second goal.

=== St Neots Town ===
On 26 March 2014, Spence joined Southern Football League side St Neots Town after having his contract cancelled by mutual consent at Colchester United.

== International career ==
Eligible to represent Wales, Spence featured for the Wales U19 team during the 2012–13 season. He made his national youth-team debut on 12 October 2012 in a 2–1 win against Slovenia, coming on as an 89th-minute substitute.

== Career statistics ==
As of match played 21 January 2014

Appearances and goals by club, season and competition
| Club | Season | League | | | FA Cup | | League Cup | | Other | | Total | |
| Club | Season | Division | Apps | Goals | Apps | Goals | Apps | Goals | Apps | Goals | Apps | Goals |
|---|---|---|---|---|---|---|---|---|---|---|---|---|
| Milton Keynes Dons | 2012–13 | League One | 0 | 0 | 0 | 0 | 0 | 0 | 1 (Note: Appearance in Football League Trophy) | 0 | 1 | 0 |
| Colchester United | 2013–14 | League One | 1 | 0 | 0 | 0 | 0 | 0 | 0 | 0 | 1 | 0 |
| Concord Rangers (loan) | 2013–14 | Conference South | 2 | 0 | 0 | 0 | 0 | 0 | 0 | 0 | 2 | 0 |
| Career total | | | 3 | 0 | 0 | 0 | 0 | 0 | 1 | 0 | 4 | 0 |
