= Daniel Pappoe =

Ghanaian footballer (born 1993)

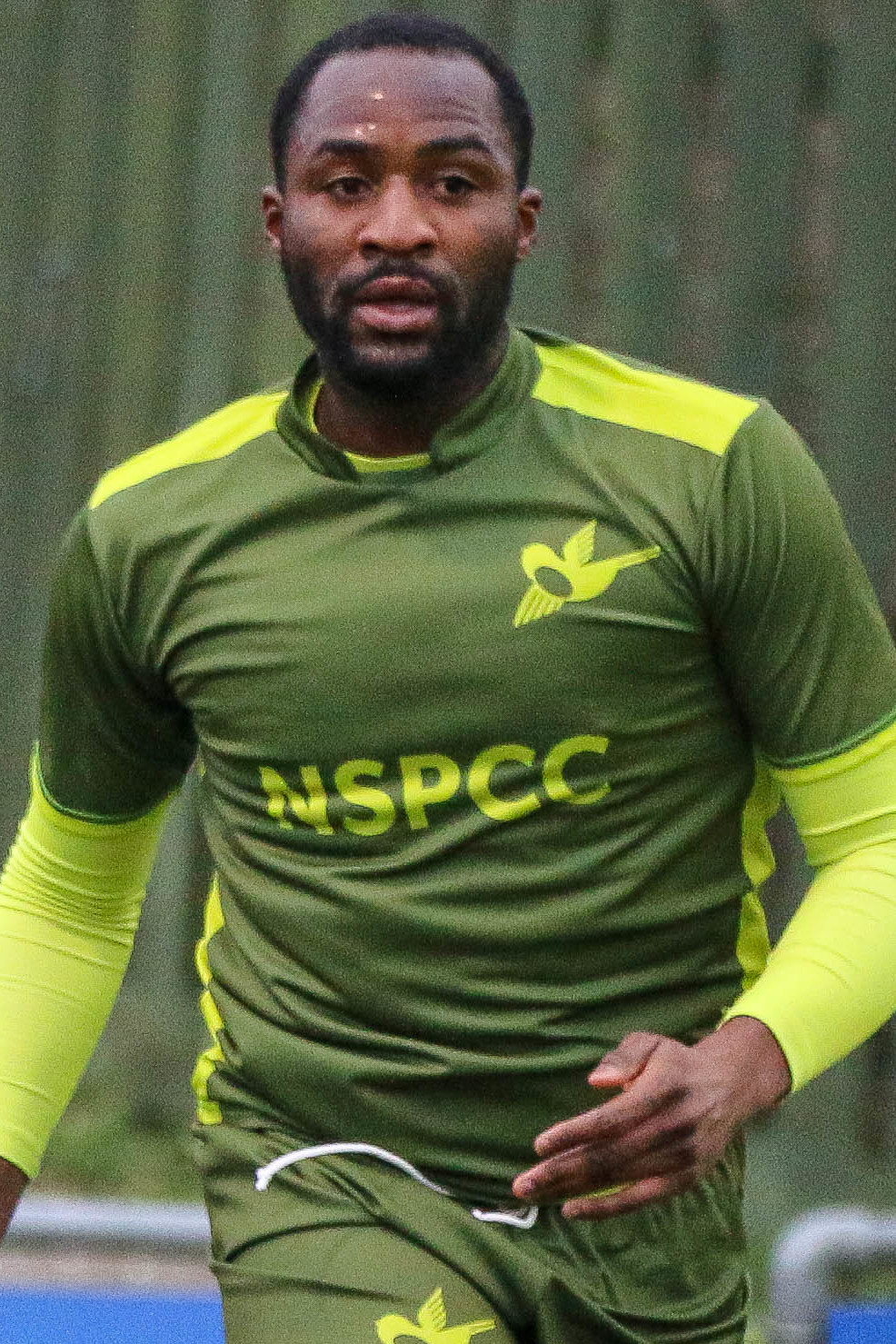
- Pappoe playing for Carshalton Athletic in 2020

Personal information
- Full name: Daniel Mills Pappoe
- Date of birth: 30 December 1993 (age 32)
- Place of birth: Accra, Ghana
- Height: 1.91 m (6 ft 3 in)
- Position: Defender

Team information
- Current team: Redhill (Assistant Manager)

Youth career
- 2005–2013: Chelsea
- 2014–2015: Brighton & Hove Albion

Senior career*
Years	Team	Apps	(Gls)
2013–2014	Chelsea	0	(0)
2013	→ Colchester United (loan)	2	(0)
2014	→ Kingstonian (loan)	12	(0)
2014–2015	Brighton & Hove Albion	0	(0)
2015	Hampton & Richmond Borough	0	(0)
2015–2016	Hemel Hempstead Town	5	(0)
2016	Berliner AK 07	1	(0)
2016	Hemel Hempstead Town	4	(0)
2016–2017	Crawley Town	0	(0)
2017	New Radiant	0	(0)
2017	Foresta Suceava	7	(0)
2018–2019	Dulwich Hamlet	6	(0)
2018	→ Carshalton Athletic (loan)	10	(1)
2019–2020	Carshalton Athletic	40	(2)
2020–2021	Worthing	3	(0)
2021–2022	Wingate & Finchley	16	(0)
2022	Carshalton Athletic	8	(0)
2022–2024	Chipstead	27	(1)
2024-2026	Roffey	40	(2)
Total		181	(6)

International career
2013	Ghana U20	2	(0)
- * Club domestic league appearances and goals as of 10:35, 30 April 2026 (GMT)

Daniel Mills Pappoe (born 30 December 1993) is a Ghanaian former professional footballer who last played for Roffey. He previously played for Crawley Town, Brighton & Hove Albion, Chelsea and Colchester United. He is currently the assistant manager at Redhill.

== Club career ==
=== Chelsea ===
Pappoe joined Chelsea as a schoolboy at under-12 level. He featured for the Chelsea reserves during the 2009–10 season while still studying at school. He was the captain of the FA Youth Cup-winning squad of 2010, though he missed the final through injury.

He played nine reserve games, but was sent off against Blackpool after lashing out at an opponent. He missed the start of the 2011–12 season with injuries, returning in early 2012, only to suffer another serious injury, where he was ruled out for the remainder of the season. He returned to action with the youth and reserve teams part-way through the 2012–13 season, and featured in the semi-final and final of the 2012–13 NextGen Series, where the Blues finished as runners-up to Aston Villa.

==== Loan spells ====
Yet to make his Chelsea first-team debut, Pappoe signed on loan with League One club Colchester United on 16 July 2013, teaming up with fellow Chelsea youth-team product Sam Walker in his second loan-spell with the U's. He made his professional debut as an 86th-minute substitute for Alex Gilbey in a 2–2 draw with Bradford City on 14 September. However, just four minutes after coming on, he was given a red card for a tackle on former Colchester player Mark Yeates, becoming the seventh United player to be sent off on their debut. On 31 October 2013, Pappoe's loan at Colchester was terminated due to his opportunities being limited.

Following Pappoe's unsuccessful loan spell at Colchester United, he joined Isthmian Premier League side Kingstonian on a one-month loan deal.

=== Post Chelsea career ===
On 4 August 2014, Pappoe along with former Chelsea teammate George Cole, joined the development squad of Brighton & Hove Albion signing a one-year deal. However, on 30 June 2015, Pappoe was released at the expiry of his short-term deal without making a single appearance for Brighton.

On 25 October 2015, Pappoe joined Isthmian Premier Division side Hampton & Richmond Borough on a non-contract deal. However, after failing to make an appearance under manager Alan Dowson, Pappoe left the club.

On 19 December 2015, Pappoe joined National League South side Hemel Hempstead Town on a short-term deal. On the same day, Pappoe made his Hemel Hempstead Town debut in a 2–0 victory over Oxford City, playing the full 90 minutes. After only making four more appearances, Pappoe made the switch to German side Berliner AK 07. Although after making only making one appearance, Pappoe returned to England to re-join Hemel Hempstead Town, where he went onto make only four more league appearances.

On 9 August 2016, Pappoe joined League Two side Crawley Town on a non-contract basis, re-uniting with former Chelsea Reserves and Academy manager Dermot Drummy. On 4 October 2016, after almost two months after signing for Crawley, Pappoe was given his debut in a 2–0 victory over Charlton Athletic in an EFL Trophy tie, replacing Mark Connolly with eight minutes remaining.

On 11 January 2017, Pappoe joined Maldives-based side New Radiant, after failing to impress at Crawley. However, after three weeks of his arrival in the Maldives, his contract with New Radiant was promptly rescinded and he was given ten days notice after the club assessed his performance as poor. It was also confirmed that he had a pre-existing knee injury that he had failed to declare pre-transfer.

On 22 August 2017, Pappoe joined Romanian side Foresta Suceava although doubts about his fitness status still remain.

Pappoe had been playing for Carshalton Athletic from 15 September to 16 December 2018 on loan from Dulwich Hamlet. However, on 28 January 2019, he signed permanently for Carshalton Athletic.

After a short-term spell at Worthing during a disrupted 2021–22 campaign due to the COVID-19 pandemic, Pappoe joined Wingate & Finchley in August 2021 and made twenty appearances. In January 2022, he returned to divisional rivals Carshalton Athletic for a third time and went straight into the side for the tie against Cheshunt.

Ahead of the 2022–23 campaign, Pappoe joined Chipstead.

After Appearing 27 times for Chipstead, Pappoe moved to Southern Combination Premier Division side Roffey in September 2024, for which he won man of the match on his debut in a 4–1 win over Shoreham. In his second game for the Boars Pappoe was shown a straight red card for violent conduct, his first in his non-league career, as Roffey fell to a 3–1 home defeat against Crowborough Athletic. Pappoe scored his first Roffey goal on 28 December 2024, in a 3–1 away win against eventual league champions Hassocks.

At the end of the 2025–26 season Pappoe left Roffey after the club appointed a new manager in Naim Rouane who saw Pappoe as surplus to the squad, with Pappoe then moving onto sign for Redhill in the Combined Counties Football League.

== International career ==
In 2013, he represented Ghana's under-20 national team in the four-team Valais Youth Cup. He played in games versus Kosovo and Brazil. He was initially named in the FIFA U-20 World Cup squad but was later replaced by Baba Mensah.

== Personal life ==
Pappoe was born in Accra, Ghana. He grew up in the Deptford area of South East London. He lived in the Cobham area when he joined the Chelsea Youth Academy as a school boy.

== Career statistics ==
As of match played 18 April 2026

Appearances and goals by club, season and competition
Club	Season	League			National Cup		League Cup		Other		Total	
Club	Season	Division	Apps	Goals	Apps	Goals	Apps	Goals	Apps	Goals	Apps	Goals
Chelsea	2013–14	Premier League	0	0	0	0	0	0	0	0	0	0
Colchester United (loan)	2013–14	League One	2	0	0	0	0	0	0	0	2	0
Kingstonian (loan)	2013–14	Isthmian League Premier Division	12	0	—		—		1 (Note: Appearance in the Isthmian League Premier Division play-offs)	0	13	0
Brighton & Hove Albion	2014–15	Championship	0	0	0	0	0	0	—		0	0
Hampton & Richmond Borough	2015–16	Isthmian League Premier Division	0	0	—		—		0	0	0	0
Hemel Hempstead Town	2015–16	National League South	5	0	—		—		—		5	0
Berliner AK 07	2015–16	Regionalliga Nordost	1	0	—		—		—		1	0
Hemel Hempstead Town	2015–16	National League South	4	0	—		—		—		4	0
Crawley Town	2016–17	League Two	0	0	0	0	0	0	2 (Note: Appearances in the EFL Trophy)	0	2	0
New Radiant	2017	Dhivehi Premier League	0	0	0	0	—		0	0	0	0
Foresta Suceava	2017–18	Liga II	7	0	0	0	—		—		7	0
Dulwich Hamlet	2018–19	National League South	6	0	0	0	—		0	0	6	0
Carshalton Athletic (loan)	2018–19	Isthmian League Premier Division	10	1	—		—		2 (Note: Appearances in the FA Trophy)	0	12	1
Carshalton Athletic	2018–19	Isthmian League Premier Division	13	0	—		—		3 (Note: Two appearances in the FA Trophy, one in the Isthmian League Premier Division play-offs)	0	16	0
Carshalton Athletic	2019–20	Isthmian League Premier Division	27	2	4	0	—		4	0	35	2
Carshalton Athletic	Total		40	2	4	0	—		7	0	51	2
Worthing	2020–21	Isthmian League Premier Division	3	0	—		—		1	0	4	0
Wingate & Finchley	2021–22	Isthmian League Premier Division	16	0	3	0	—		2	0	21	0
Carshalton Athletic	2021–22	Isthmian League Premier Division	8	0	—		—		—		8	0
Chipstead	2022–23	Isthmian League South Central Division	27	1	0	0	—		2	0	29	1
Roffey	2024-25	Southern Combination Premier Division	18	1	0	0	0	0	1	0	19	1
Roffey	2025–26	Southern Combination Premier Division	22	1	0	0	1	0	3	0	26	1
Redhill	2026-27	Combined Counties Premier Division South	0	0	0	0	0	0	0	0	0	0
Career total			181	6	7	0	1	0	20	0	210	6
