= Alie Sesay =

Sierra Leonean footballer

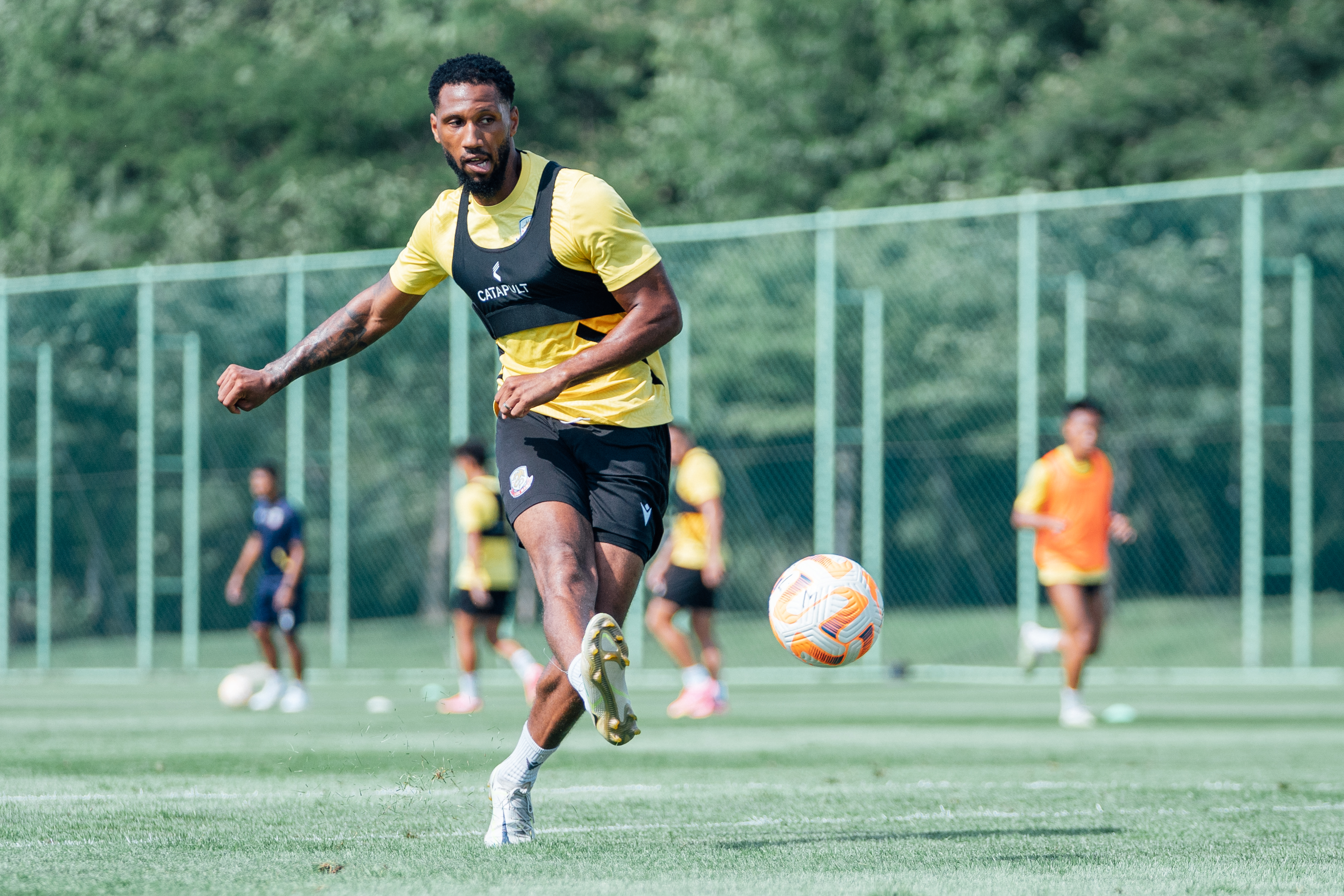

Personal information
- Full name: Alie Sesay
- Date of birth: 2 August 1994 (age 32)
- Place of birth: Enfield, England
- Height: 1.85 m (6 ft 1 in)
- Position: Centre-back

Team information
- Current team: Radcliffe (on loan from Morecambe)
- Number: 28

Youth career
- –2010: Arsenal
- 2010–2013: Leicester City

Senior career*
Years	Team	Apps	(Gls)
2012–2016	Leicester City	0	(0)
2014	→ Colchester United (loan)	3	(0)
2015	→ Cambridge United (loan)	5	(0)
2016–2017	Barnet	18	(0)
2017–2018	IK Frej	36	(2)
2018–2019	Chania	25	(0)
2019–2020	Arda Kardzhali	1	(0)
2020–2021	Zira	9	(0)
2021	Sabail	13	(0)
2021–2022	Persebaya Surabaya	27	(1)
2022	PSIS Semarang	14	(0)
2023	Lee Man	1	(0)
2023	Kelantan	0	(0)
2023–2024	Khanh Hoa	22	(0)
2024–2025	Thanh Hoa	0	(0)
2025–	Morecambe	11	(0)
2026–	→ Radcliffe (loan)	1	(0)

International career
2014–2022	Sierra Leone	11	(0)
- * Club domestic league appearances and goals as of 7 March 2026

Alie Sesay (born 2 August 1994) is a professional footballer who plays as a centre-back for National League North club Radcliffe on loan from National League club Morecambe. Born in England, he represents the Sierra Leone national team.

== Club career ==
=== Early career ===
Sesay was in the academy at Arsenal, before joining Leicester City in 2010. On 15 March 2013, he signed a professional contract with Leicester City, alongside Australian Callum Elder.

==== Colchester United (loan) ====
On 24 January 2014, Sesay joined Colchester United on loan for the rest of the season. Finally on 26 February, he made his debut for the club in a 1–0 loss against Sheffield United coming as a 46th-minute substitute for Brian Wilson.

==== Cambridge United (loan) ====
In October 2015, Sesay joined League Two side Cambridge United on a one-month loan deal.

=== Barnet F.C. ===
Sesay signed for Barnet in an 18-month deal on 15 January 2016. He was released by mutual consent on 31 January 2017 after only five league appearances in the 2016–17 season.

=== IK Frej ===
After interest from AFC Eskilstuna in January 2017, Sesay joined IK Frej the following month. He departed the club midway through the 2018 season after playing a leading role and Captaining the team on several occasions.

=== Chania FC ===
On 6 August 2018, Sesay joined Football League Greece side Chania. Sesay finished the season as the player of the year for Chania helping the team to 12 clean sheets in 25 of his appearances in the Greek Football League.

=== FC Arda Kardzhali ===
On 9 August 2019, Sesay joined Bulgarian First League side Arda Kardzhali on a two-year deal.

=== Zira FK ===
On 14 January 2020, Sesay joined Azerbaijan Premier League club Zira on an 18-month contract.

=== Sabail FK ===
On 31 January 2021, Sesay joined Azerbaijan Premier League side Sabail. He made his debut on 13 February, as a starter in a 3–0 defeat to Sumgayit.

=== Persebaya Surabaya ===
On 12 June 2021, Sesay joined Indonesian Liga 1 side Persebaya Surabaya. Sesay made his first-team debut on 11 September 2021 in a match against Persikabo 1973.

=== PSIS Semarang ===
Sesay is a player who completes the PSIS foreign legion 2022–23 Liga 1 season. This Sierra Leone national team player was brought in by PSIS management so that the back line was more solid.

=== Lee Man ===
On 20 January 2023, Sesay joined Hong Kong Premier League club Lee Man.

=== Kelantan ===
On 31 July 2023, Sesay joined Malaysia Super League club Kelantan.

=== Vietnam ===
Sesay joined V.League 1 club Khanh Hoa on 6 October 2023. After their relegation, he remained in the top flight with Thanh Hoa for the 2024–25 season but did not make any appearances.

=== Morecambe ===
After eight years away from the English game, Sesay signed for Morecambe on 21 August 2025. On 16 May 2026, Morecambe announced he was being released.

== International career ==
Sesay was called up by Sierra Leone for the first time in October 2014. He made his debut in a 2015 Africa Cup of Nations qualification match against Cameroon on 11 October 2014.

== Career statistics ==
=== Club ===
As of end of 2024–25 season

Appearances and goals by club, season and competition
Club	Season	League			Domestic Cup		League Cup		Other		Total	
Club	Season	Division	Apps	Goals	Apps	Goals	Apps	Goals	Apps	Goals	Apps	Goals
Colchester United (loan)	2013–14	League One	3	0	0	0	–		–		3	0
Cambridge United (loan)	2015–16	League Two	5	0	1	0	–		–		6	0
Barnet	2015–16	League Two	13	0	0	0	–		–		13	0
Barnet	2016–17	League Two	5	0	0	0	–		2 (Note: Appearances in the EFL Trophy)	0	7	0
Barnet	Total		18	0	0	0	0	0	2	0	20	0
IK Frej	2017	Superettan	27	2	1	0	–		2 (Note: Appearances in the Superettan relegation playoffs)	0	30	2
IK Frej	2018	Superettan	9	0	4	0	–		–		13	0
IK Frej	Total		36	2	5	0	0	0	2	0	43	2
Chania	2018–19	Football League Greece	25	0	3	0	–		–		28	0
Arda Kardzhali	2019–20	Bulgarian First League	1	0	0	0	–		–		1	0
Zira	2019–20	Azerbaijan Premier League	6	0	0	0	–		–		6	0
Zira	2020–21	Azerbaijan Premier League	3	0	0	0	–		–		3	0
Zira	Total		9	0	0	0	0	0	0	0	9	0
Sabail	2020–21	Azerbaijan Premier League	13	0	0	0	–		–		13	0
Persebaya Surabaya	2021–22	Liga 1	27	1	0	0	–		–		27	1
PSIS Semarang	2022–23	Liga 1	14	0	0	0	–		5 (Note: Appearances in the Indonesia President's Cup.)	0	19	0
Lee Man	2022–23	Hong Kong Premier League	1	0	0	0	2	1	–		3	1
Kelantan	2023	Malaysia Super League	0	0	0	0	0	0	–		0	0
Khanh Hoa	2023–24	V.League 1	22	0	1	0	0	0	–		23	0
Thanh Hoa	2024–25	V.League 1	0	0	0	0	0	0	–		0	0
Morecambe	2025–26	National League	0	0	0	0	0	0	–		0	0
Career total			174	3	10	0	2	1	9	0	195	4

=== International ===
As of match played 13 June 2022.

Appearances and goals by national team and year
National team	Year	Apps	Goals
Sierra Leone	2014	3	0
Sierra Leone	2018	2	0
Sierra Leone	2019	2	0
Sierra Leone	2020	2	0
Sierra Leone	2022	2	0
Total		11	0

== Honours ==
Individual

- Liga 1 Team of the Season: 2021–22
