= 2012–13 Milton Keynes Dons F.C. season =

Milton Keynes Dons
2012–13 season
- Chairman: Pete Winkelman
- Manager: Karl Robinson
- Stadium: Stadium mk
- League One: 8th
- FA Cup: Fifth round
- League Cup: Third round
- League Trophy: First round
- Top goalscorer: League: Ryan Lowe (11); All: Dean Bowditch (12); Ryan Lowe (12)
- Highest home attendance: 16,459 (vs AFC Wimbledon); 2 December 2012, FA Cup R2
- Lowest home attendance: 3,444 (vs Northampton Town); 4 September 2012, League Trophy R1
- Average home league attendance: 8,612
- Biggest win: 6–1 (vs Cambridge City); 13 November 2012, FA Cup R1
- Biggest defeat: 2–4 (vs Walsall); 26 December 2012, League One
Home colours	Away colours	Third colours

The 2012–13 season was Milton Keynes Dons' ninth season in their existence as a professional association football club, and their fifth consecutive season competing in League One. As well as competing in League One, the club also competed in the FA Cup, League Cup and League Trophy.

The season covers the period from 1 July 2012 to 30 June 2013.

== Competitions ==
=== League One ===
Final table

Pos	Team	Pld	W	D	L	GF	GA	GD	Pts
6	Swindon Town	46	20	14	12	72	39	+33	74
7	Leyton Orient	46	21	8	17	55	48	+7	71
8	Milton Keynes Dons	46	19	13	14	62	45	+17	70
9	Walsall	46	17	17	12	65	58	+7	68
10	Crawley Town	46	18	14	14	59	58	+1	68

Source: Sky Sports

Matches

Win	Draw	Loss

Date	Opponent	Venue	Result	Scorers	Attendance	Ref
18 August 2012 – 15:00	Oldham Athletic	Home	2–0	Potter, Powell	7,409	
21 August 2012 – 19:45	Bournemouth	Away	1–1	Powell	5,407	
25 August 2012 – 15:00	Swindon Town	Away	0–1		8,299	
1 September 2012 – 15:00	Carlisle United	Home	2–0	Chadwick, Lowe	7,277	
8 September 2012 – 15:00	Walsall	Away	0–1		3,657	
15 September 2012 – 15:00	Yeovil Town	Home	1–0	MacDonald	7,235	
18 September 2012 – 19:45	Notts County	Home	1–1	O'Shea	7,121	
22 September 2012 – 15:00	Bury	Away	4–1	Bowditch (3), Chadwick	2,321	
29 September 2012 – 15:00	Crewe Alexandra	Home	1–0	MacDonald	11,037	
2 October 2012 – 19:45	Coventry City	Away	1–1	Gleeson	9,848	
6 October 2012 – 15:00	Portsmouth	Home	2–2	Webster (o.g.), Potter	10,409	
14 October 2012 – 13:15	Preston North End	Away	0–0		8,327	
20 October 2012 – 15:00	Stevenage	Home	0–1		9,190	
24 October 2012 – 19:45	Crawley Town	Away	0–2		2,853	
27 October 2012 – 15:00	Scunthorpe United	Away	3–0	Chadwick (2), Smith	2,737	
7 November 2012 – 19:45	Leyton Orient	Home	1–0	Lowe	6,985	
10 November 2012 – 15:00	Sheffield United	Home	1–0	Williams	9,835	
16 November 2012 – 19:45	Tranmere Rovers	Away	1–0	Gleeson	10,587	
20 November 2012 – 19:45	Shrewsbury Town	Away	2–2	Balanta, Bowditch	4,747	
24 November 2012 – 15:00	Colchester United	Home	5–1	Chadwick (2), Williams, Otsemobor, Lowe	7,443	
8 December 2012 – 15:00	Brentford	Away	2–3	Lowe, Gleeson	5,833	
15 December 2012 – 15:00	Hartlepool United	Home	1–0	Lowe	7,164	
26 December 2012 – 15:00	Walsall	Home	2–4	Lowe, Bowditch	8,700	
29 December 2012 – 15:00	Coventry City	Home	2–3	Powell, Lowe	13,620	
1 January 2013 – 15:00	Notts County	Away	2–1	Potter, Powell	5,325	
12 January 2013 – 15:00	Bury	Home	1–1	Bowditch	7,384	
29 January 2013 – 19:45	Yeovil Town	Away	1–2	Kay	3,152	
2 February 2013 – 15:00	Bournemouth	Home	0–3		9,233	
9 February 2013 – 15:00	Oldham Athletic	Away	1–3	Powell	4,094	
12 February 2013 – 19:45	Doncaster Rovers	Away	0–0		6,423	
23 February 2013 – 15:00	Carlisle United	Away	1–1	Chicksen	4,283	
26 February 2013 – 19:45	Portsmouth	Away	1–1	Williams	9,815	
2 March 2013 – 15:00	Preston North End	Home	1–1	Chicksen	8,412	
5 March 2013 – 19:45	Doncaster Rovers	Home	3–0	McLeod, Powell, Gleeson	6,804	
9 March 2013 – 15:00	Sheffield United	Away	0–0		17,936	
12 March 2013 – 19:45	Shrewsbury Town	Home	2–3	Lowe (2)	6,622	
16 March 2013 – 15:00	Tranmere Rovers	Home	3–0	Lewington, Gleeson, Potter	9,682	
19 March 2013 – 19:45	Crewe Alexandra	Away	1–2	Bamford	3,770	
29 March 2013 – 15:00	Hartlepool United	Away	2–0	Bamford, Bowditch	3,269	
1 April 2013 – 15:00	Brentford	Home	2–0	Bowditch, Gleeson	10,455	
6 April 2013 – 15:00	Crawley Town	Home	0–0		7,746	
9 April 2013 – 19:45	Swindon Town	Home	2–0	Kouo-Doumbé, Lowe	8,608	
13 April 2013 – 15:00	Leyton Orient	Away	0–2		4,634	
16 April 2013 – 19:45	Colchester United	Away	2–0	Powell, Bamford	3,175	
20 April 2013 – 15:00	Scunthorpe United	Home	0–1		9,752	
27 April 2013 – 15:00	Stevenage	Away	2–0	Bamford, Lowe	3,801	

=== FA Cup ===
Matches

Win	Draw	Loss

Date	Round	Opponent	Venue	Result	Scorers	Attendance	Ref
2 November 2012 – 15:00	First round	Cambridge City	Away	0–0		1,564	
13 November 2012 – 19:45	First round (replay)	Cambridge City	Home	6–1	Williams (2), O'Shea, Bowditch, Alli, Chicksen	4,126	
2 December 2012 – 12:30	Second round	AFC Wimbledon	Home	2–1	Gleeson, Otsemobor	16,459	
5 January 2013 – 15:00	Third round	Sheffield Wednesday	Away	0–0		11,462	
15 January 2013 – 19:45	Third round (replay)	Sheffield Wednesday	Home	2–0	Williams, Bowditch	6,786	
26 January 2013 – 15:00	Fourth round	Queens Park Rangers	Away	4–2	Traoré (o.g.), Lowe, Harley, Potter	18,081	
16 February 2013 – 15:00	Fifth round	Barnsley	Home	1–3	Bowditch	14,475	

=== League Cup ===
Matches

Win	Draw	Loss

Date	Round	Opponent	Venue	Result	Scorers	Attendance	Ref
11 August 2012 – 19:45	First round	Cheltenham Town	Away	1–1 (Note: After extra-time. 1–1 at the conclusion of 90 minutes. MK Dons won 5–3 on penalties.)	Bowditch	1,660	
28 August 2012 – 19:45	Second round	Blackburn Rovers	Home	2–1	Chadwick (2)	5,873	
25 September 2012 – 19:45	Third round	Sunderland	Home	0–2		10,489	

=== League Trophy ===
Matches

Win	Draw	Loss

Date	Round	Opponent	Venue	Result	Scorers	Attendance	Ref
4 September 2012 – 19:45	First round	Northampton Town	Away	0–1		3,444	

== Player details ==
Note: Players' ages as of the club's opening fixture of the 2012–13 season.

#	Name	Nationality	Position	Date of birth (age)	Signed from	Signed in	Transfer fee
Goalkeepers
1	David Martin	(England)	GK	22 January 1986 (aged 26)	(England) Liverpool	2010	Free
16	Ian McLoughlin	(Republic of Ireland)	GK	9 August 1991 (aged 21)	(England) Ipswich Town	2011	Free
Defenders
2	Jon Otsemobor	(England)	RB	23 March 1983 (aged 29)	Free agent	2012	Free
3	Dean Lewington	(England)	LB	18 May 1984 (aged 28)	(England) Wimbledon	2004	Free
4	Mathias Kouo-Doumbé	(France)	CB	28 October 1979 (aged 32)	Free agent	2009	Free
6	Shaun Williams	(Republic of Ireland)	CB	19 October 1986 (aged 25)	Free agent	2011	Free
15	Adam Chicksen	(Zimbabwe)	LB	27 September 1991 (aged 20)	Academy	2008	Trainee
22	Brendan Galloway	(Zimbabwe)	CB	17 March 1996 (aged 16)	Academy	2011	Trainee
24	Antony Kay	(England)	CB	21 October 1982 (aged 30)	(England) Huddersfield Town	2012	Free
27	Mason Spence	(Wales)	RB	20 November 1994 (aged 17)	Academy	2012	Trainee
Midfielders
7	Stephen Gleeson	(Republic of Ireland)	CM	3 August 1988 (aged 24)	(England) Wolverhampton Wanderers	2009	Undisclosed
8	Darren Potter	(Republic of Ireland)	DM	21 December 1984 (aged 27)	(England) Sheffield Wednesday	2011	Free
11	Alan Smith	(England)	CM	28 October 1980 (aged 31)	Free agent	2012	Free
18	George Baldock	(Greece)	RM	9 March 1993 (aged 19)	Academy	2009	Trainee
20	Ryan Harley	(England)	AM	22 January 1985 (aged 27)	(England) Brighton & Hove Albion	2013	Loan
21	Dele Alli	(England)	CM	11 April 1996 (aged 16)	Academy	2011	Trainee
23	Chris Lines	(England)	CM	30 November 1985 (aged 26)	(England) Sheffield Wednesday	2013	Loan
26	Luke Chadwick	(England)	AM	18 November 1980 (aged 31)	(England) Norwich City	2009	Free
31	Giorgio Rasulo	(England)	CM	23 January 1997 (aged 15)	Academy	2012	Trainee
Forwards
9	Dean Bowditch	(England)	LW	15 June 1986 (aged 26)	(England) Yeovil Town	2011	Free
13	Izale McLeod	(England)	CF	15 October 1984 (aged 27)	Free agent	2013	Free
14	Ryan Lowe	(England)	CF	18 September 1978 (aged 33)	(England) Sheffield Wednesday	2012	Undisclosed
17	Daniel Powell	(England)	LW	12 March 1991 (aged 21)	Academy	2008	Trainee
33	Patrick Bamford	(England)	CF	5 September 1993 (aged 18)	(England) Chelsea	2012	Loan
Out on loan
5	Gary MacKenzie	(Scotland)	CB	15 October 1985 (aged 26)	(Scotland) Dundee	2010	Free
16	Tom Flanagan	(Northern Ireland)	CB	21 October 1991 (aged 20)	Academy	2010	Trainee
Left club during season
10	Charlie MacDonald	(England)	CF	13 February 1981 (aged 31)	(England) Brentford	2011	£35,000
13	Jimmy Bullard	(England)	CM	23 October 1978 (aged 33)	Free agent	2012	Free
19	Jabo Ibehre	(England)	CF	28 January 1983 (aged 29)	Free agent	2009	Free
23	Jay O'Shea	(Republic of Ireland)	AM	10 August 1988 (aged 24)	Free agent	2011	Free
28	Scott Allan	(Scotland)	AM	28 November 1991 (aged 20)	(England) West Bromwich Albion	2012	Loan
28	Ibra Sekajja	(Uganda)	CF	31 October 1992 (aged 19)	(England) Crystal Palace	2012	Loan
29	Ángelo Balanta	(Colombia)	CF	1 July 1990 (aged 22)	(England) Queens Park Rangers	2012	Loan
32	Zeli Ismail	(England)	AM	12 December 1993 (aged 18)	(England) Wolverhampton Wanderers	2012	Loan

== Transfers ==
=== Transfers in ===
Date from	Position	Name	From	Fee	Ref.
5 July 2012	DF	(England) Jon Otsemobor	Free agent (Note: Previous club: Sheffield Wednesday.)	Free transfer	
12 July 2012	MF	(England) Alan Smith	Free agent (Note: Previous club: Newcastle United.)	Free transfer	
1 August 2012	FW	(England) Ryan Lowe	Sheffield Wednesday	Undisclosed	
10 August 2012	DF	(England) Antony Kay	Free agent (Note: Previous club: Huddersfield Town.)	Free transfer	
28 August 2012	MF	(England) Jimmy Bullard	Free agent (Note: Previous club: Ipswich Town.)	Free transfer	
3 January 2013	FW	(England) Izale McLeod	Portsmouth	Free transfer (Note: Mutual contract termination.)	

=== Transfers out ===
Date from	Position	Name	To	Fee	Ref.
11 January 2013	MF	(Republic of Ireland) Jay O'Shea	Chesterfield	Free transfer (Note: Mutual contract termination.)	
22 January 2013	FW	(England) Jabo Ibehre	Colchester United	Free transfer	

=== Loans in ===
Start date	Position	Name	From	End date	Ref.
29 September 2012	MF	(Scotland) Scott Allan	West Bromwich Albion	29 October 2012	
23 October 2012	FW	(Colombia) Ángelo Balanta	Queens Park Rangers	21 November 2012	
7 November 2012	FW	(England) Ibra Sekajja	Crystal Palace	1 January 2013	
22 November 2012	FW	(England) Patrick Bamford	Chelsea	End of season (Note: Extended. Originally until 7 January 2013.)	
22 November 2012	MF	(England) Zeli Ismail	Wolverhampton Wanderers	End of season (Note: Extended. Originally until 2 January 2013.)	
1 January 2013	MF	(England) Ryan Harley	Brighton & Hove Albion	End of season	
23 January 2013	MF	(England) Chris Lines	Sheffield Wednesday	End of season	

=== Loans out ===
Start date	Position	Name	To	End date	Ref.
31 July 2012	DF	(Northern Ireland) Tom Flanagan	Gillingham	November 2012 (Note: Recalled due to injury. Originally until January 2013.)	
27 September 2012	FW	(England) Jabo Ibehre	Colchester United	27 December 2012	
20 November 2012	MF	(Republic of Ireland) Jay O'Shea	Chesterfield	5 January 2013	
13 January 2013	GK	(Republic of Ireland) Ian McLoughlin	Walsall	Unknown	
1 March 2013	DF	(Scotland) Gary MacKenzie	Blackpool	End of season	
14 March 2013	DF	(Northern Ireland) Tom Flanagan	Barnet	End of season	
