= 2013–14 Colchester United F.C. season =

Colchester United
2013–14 season
- Owner: Robbie Cowling
- Chairman: Robbie Cowling
- Manager: Joe Dunne
- Stadium: Colchester Community Stadium
- League One: 16th
- FA Cup: 1st round (eliminated by Sheffield United)
- League Cup: 1st round (eliminated by Peterborough United)
- Football League Trophy: 1st round (southern section) (eliminated by Dagenham & Redbridge)
- Top goalscorer: League: Freddie Sears (12); All: Freddie Sears (12)
- Highest home attendance: 7,295 v Wolverhampton Wanderers, 5 October 2013
- Lowest home attendance: 2,368 v Peterborough United, 6 August 2013
- Average home league attendance: 3,631
- Biggest win: 4–0 v Stevenage, 26 December 2013
- Biggest defeat: 0–4 v Notts County, 14 December 2013; 1–5 v Peterborough United, 6 August 2013
Home colours	Away colours

The 2013–14 season was Colchester United's 72nd season in their history and sixth successive season in the third tier of English football, League One. Alongside competing in the League One, the club also participated in the FA Cup, the League Cup and the Football League Trophy.

In Joe Dunne's first full season in charge of the club, he brought in some of his loanees from the 2012–13 season on permanent contracts, including Craig Eastmond, Sanchez Watt and Sam Walker. There was an emphasis on youth as the U's brought through a number of their Academy products and handed them their first-team debuts throughout the season. Dunne effectively secured League One football for another season in the penultimate game when they soundly beat already-promoted Brentford 4–1 before securing victory on the final day of the season at Walsall.

Colchester had a second successive season of exiting the cup competitions at the earliest possible stage following heavy defeats by Peterborough United and Dagenham & Redbridge in the League Cup and Football League Trophy respectively, while they pushed Sheffield United close in the FA Cup first round after coming back from 2–0 down at half-time to level the score before a late Sheffield penalty decided the tie.

== Season overview ==
=== Pre-season ===
Having narrowly avoided relegation to League Two on the final day of the previous season, manager Joe Dunne began strengthening the team early in pre-season, announcing former Arsenal loanee Craig Eastmond had signed a pre-contract agreement with the club on 20 May. Dunne had already allowed Matt Heath and Jackson Ramm to search for a new club with their contracts expiring in June.

Colchester's development squad was bolstered first by the signing of Milton Keynes Dons youth-team product Mason Spence, and the news that young striker Freddie Ladapo had signed a new one-year contract to remain with the club. Goalkeeper Mark Cousins also extended his stay at the club, agreeing a new one-year contract on 14 June.

Long-serving defender John White decided to bring an end to his nine-year stay with Colchester after rejecting a reduced-terms contract offer by the club. However, last seasons joint-leading goalscorer Jabo Ibehre agreed a two-year contract extension on 17 June.

On 28 June, another former Arsenal loanee joined the club on a permanent basis when Sanchez Watt signed a two-year contract with the club. Another development squad signing was made on 2 July when former Queens Park Rangers midfielder Conor Hubble signed following a trial period at the club.

The first-team squad played their first friendly of pre-season on 10 July when they beat Heybridge Swifts 2–1. Ben Newson had given the home side a first-half lead prior to Craig Eastmond being stretchered off following a challenge from Ryan Doyle. The U's got themselves back into the game prior to the hour mark through John-Joe O'Toole following a Drey Wright assist. Wright then turned scorer with 18-minutes remaining to earn a narrow victory. On 12 July, Colchester faced AFC Sudbury and secured a 5–0 win with a brace from Sammie Szmodics and goals from triallist Phil Roberts, Marcus Bean and John-Joe O'Toole. The following day, Colchester collected another win with a 2–0 victory at Bishop's Stortford as Gavin Massey and Clinton Morrison scored.

On 16 July, Colchester signed Chelsea's Ghanaian defender Daniel Pappoe in a sixth-month loan deal, having already featured in Colchester's previous two friendly matches. They then took on West Ham United in a friendly fixture the same day. West Ham won 2–1 courtesy of goals from Joe Cole and James Collins. Jabo Ibehre scored a consolation for Colchester from a Tosin Olufemi cross with the final kick of the game.

On 19 July another Chelsea player and former loanee rejoined the club when Sam Walker signed until 19 January. He then featured in Colchester's 0–0 draw with Tottenham Hotspur at the Colchester Community Stadium that evening. The following day, the U's faced Braintree Town at Cressing Road where they won 4–1 with goals from Andy Bond, Marcus Bean, Freddie Ladapo and Ryan Melaugh. Sean Marks pulled a goal back for the home side at 3–1.

Colchester faced local rivals Ipswich Town in their next friendly on 23 July but were beaten 3–0 by the visitors. Ex-U's player Anthony Wordsworth set up Luke Chambers for the first goal, with later goals added by David McGoldrick and Daryl Murphy.

John-Joe O'Toole made a move to Bristol Rovers for an undisclosed fee on 24 July having previously spent time on loan there during the 2012–13 season. Also on 24 July, Colchester travelled to play Histon where they won 1–0 thanks to a David Wright goal.

Triallist and former-Southampton player Ryan Dickson signed a one-year contract with the club on 26 July. Meanwhile, Drey Wright also agreed a new three-year contract to keep him tied to the club until summer 2016.

On 27 July, the club played simultaneous friendlies, one game at Maldon & Tiptree and the other at Needham Market. Daniel Pappoe and Freddie Sears scored the goals against Maldon & Tiptree in a 2–1 victory, while Marcus Bean, Gavin Massey and Clinton Morrison provided the goals in a 3–0 win against Needham.

=== August ===
Colchester started the new season with a trip to Priestfield Stadium to face Gillingham on 3 August. Ryan Dickson made his debut while Craig Eastmond and Sam Walker both made their second debuts for the club. The U's snatched an 89th-minute winner from substitute Andy Bond.

For the third consecutive season, Colchester exited the League Cup at the first round stage. On 6 August they suffered a 5–1 defeat by Peterborough United at the Community Stadium. Peterborough went in at half-time with a 1–0 lead, but Ibehre scored his first goal of the season a couple of minutes after the break to level the scores. However, Peterborough scored four goals in 21 minutes to confine the U's to another early cup exit.

The U's bounced back from midweek Cup disappointment to record a second successive 1–0 league victory over Port Vale with Gavin Massey scoring the decisive goal. They then held Sheffield United to a 1–1 draw at Bramall Lane. Freddie Sears had opened the scoring following a counter-attack in the 25th minute, but the Blades equalised on the stroke of half-time when a Harry Maguire shot slipped through Sam Walker's gloves. Colchester continued their unbeaten run on 23 August as they came from behind to draw with Carlisle United. Matty Robson scored after just four minutes but Freddie Sears struck to score his second goal in as many games to rescue a point for the home side.

Colchester fell to their first league defeat of the season on 31 August to a table-topping Leyton Orient side. Each of the goals scored in the 2–1 win for the O's came from players that had played for both clubs. Ex-Colchester player Kevin Lisbie scored the winner after former U's loanee Dave Mooney had opened the scoring in the 13th-minute. Former Orient player Ibehre scored the only goal for Colchester on 35-minutes. The win gave Orient their first victory at Colchester since 1951.

=== September ===
Long serving club captain Kemal Izzet ended his 12-year stay at the club on 2 September. Having failed to make a first-team appearance in the first month of the season, both the club and player agreed to mutually cancel Izzet's contract in order for him to find regular football.

On 3 September, Colchester crashed out of the Football League Trophy by a 4–1 margin at Dagenham & Redbridge. The visitors struck first when newly-appointed captain Brian Wilson scored from a free kick in the 38th-minute. However, Magnus Okuonghae was sent off for a second bookable offence in the 52nd-minute as former Colchester youth team product Medy Elito scored an equaliser one minute later. Goals from Dagenham in the 64th, 78th, and 85th-minutes ensured a second cup thrashing of the campaign for the U's.

Following a series of injuries and suspensions, Colchester went into their game with Coventry City with numerous changes required to the first-team squad. The game was played at Northampton Town's Sixfields Stadium due to an ongoing dispute between the club and the Ricoh Arena's. It ended 2–0 to the "home" team and Joe Dunne said that he had "no complaints" with the result considering he only had nine players available for training on the Thursday prior to the game.

In light of the injury crisis, Dunne brought in two loanees in time for the following weekends fixture against Bradford City. Incoming were winger Jeffrey Monakana from Preston North End, and full back Luke Garbutt from Everton as cover for Ryan Dickson who had been suffering from a virus in recent weeks. In the match on 14 September, the U's fell behind to a Nahki Wells goal after 15 minutes, but Monakana scored on his debut to level the scores on 28 minutes. Jabo Ibehre scored his third goal of the season four minutes later, but after the break Wells struck again. Daniel Pappoe came on for Alex Gilbey on 86 minutes to make his professional debut, but just four minutes later he was sent off for a tackle on former Colchester player Mark Yeates.

Following Pappoe's red card, further defensive reinforcement was required as Dunne recruited Queens Park Rangers' Northern Ireland under-21 international Jamie Sendles-White and Bradford's Matt Taylor on one-month loan deals.

On 21 September, Colchester hosted Crawley Town at the Community Stadium. Freddie Sears scored on six minutes but the visitors levelled after half-an-hour through Emile Sinclair to draw 1–1.

Matt Taylor scored in just his second appearance for the club in their 1–1 draw with Bristol City at Ashton Gate Stadium on 28 September, a game which saw the debut of Academy graduate Sammie Szmodics who came on as a late substitute for Craig Eastmond. The result left Colchester without a win in six games.

=== October ===
Colchester hosted promotion-favourites Wolverhampton Wanderers on 5 October as a team featuring a number of emergency loanees and youth-team products were beaten 3–0. A home game against Walsall followed on 12 October. Freddie Sears scored after seven minutes with his fourth goal of the season, but Walsall scored an equaliser in the sixth minute of injury time to draw 1–1.

Brentford beat Colchester 3–1 on 19 October. After Magnus Okuonghae had scored his first goal of the season, Brentford scored three goals in ten minutes in the second half to seal victory. The U's then travelled to Shrewsbury Town on 22 October where Marcus Bean scored his first goal for the club in a game which ended 1–1, extending Colchester's winless run to eleven games, while another Academy graduate Macauley Bonne made his first-team debut.

Making his home debut on his birthday on 26 October, Macauley Bonne scored his first professional goal against Peterborough United eight minutes after coming on as a substitute for Clinton Morrison to end the U's winless streak with a 1–0 victory.

=== November ===
Rotherham United hosted the U's and held them to a 2–2 draw on 2 November after both sides had taken a lead in the game. Marcus Bean scored after seven minutes but Colchester conceded two minutes later to a Matt Tubbs goal. Kieran Agard gave the hosts the lead on 22-minutes, but Elliot Lee scored an equaliser, his first in professional football, in second half injury time.

In the FA Cup first round, Colchester were drawn at home to Sheffield United. The visitors had a two goal lead after twelve minutes, but a second-half revival brought the U's back into the match. Macauley Bonne capped his first professional start with a goal three minutes after the break. Then, Everton loanee Luke Garbutt scored from 25-yards to draw level on 64 minutes. A contentious penalty decision against Magnus Okuonghae for hand-ball allowed Chris Porter to score the winner in a 3–2 victory.

Colchester resumed League One activities on 16 November at home to Swindon Town and lost 2–1 with a Magnus Okuonghae goal their consolation as it left the U's with one win in 16 games in all competitions. On 23 November, they faced Preston in a game which Colchester could only manage one shot on target. They did however scrape a 1–1 draw from the match in which Preston attempted 26 shots, Luke Garbutt with the U's goal.

On 26 November, Colchester won their first game of the month when they defeated Milton Keynes Dons 3–1 at home. Craig Eastmond scored his first of the season, while Jabo Ibehre and Macauley Bonne both scored after coming on as substitutes. They then travelled to Birkenhead to take on Tranmere Rovers on 30 November where they were beaten 2–1 with two goals for Ryan Lowe securing victory for the home side and Clinton Morrison scored his first of the season in stoppage time.

=== December ===
Following a two-week break for the FA Cup second round in which Colchester did not take part, the U's faced bottom of the table Notts County at the Community Stadium on 14 December. The visitors scored two goals in either half to hand Colchester their heaviest defeat of the season. Colchester then travelled to another team struggling in the league to face Oldham Athletic on 21 December. They achieved their first away victory since the opening day of the season win against Gillingham, winning 2–0 through an own goal from Latics defender Ellis Plummer and then Jabo Ibehre's fifth goal of the season.

On Boxing Day, Joe Dunne enjoyed his biggest win as Colchester manager when the U's beat Stevenage 4–0 at home. Colchester's goals came from West Ham loanee Blair Turgott, Jabo Ibehre, Craig Eastmond in the first half hour and Eastmond added a second later in the second half.

In the final game of 2013 on 29 December, Colchester hosted Crewe Alexandra, now bottom of the league. After taking the lead through a deflected Luke Garbutt free kick, Crewe pulled two goals back in three second-half minutes to consign Colchester to a 2–1 defeat.

=== January ===
Colchester drew 0–0 with Milton Keynes Dons on New Year's Day.

Andy Bond was then released from his contract after three-and-a-half years with the club, while Dunne offered a deal to keep Dominic Vose with the club until the end of the season after joining on a rolling contract in November.

On 11 January, Colchester beat Gillingham 3–0 as Sanchez Watt scored his first goal of the season, while Clinton Morrison scored his second of the season and Freddie Sears marked his return from injury with a late goal.

On 16 January, the club announced Alex Gilbey had signed a contract extension to remain with the club until summer 2016. This followed news that Joe Dunne had offered a permanent contract to on-loan Chelsea goalkeeper Sam Walker.

Colchester won 4–2 at Brunton Park against Carlisle United on 18 January to move back into the top-half of the League One table. Sanchez Watt scored a first-half brace, separated only by a Magnus Okuonghae own goal. Marcus Bean scored Colchester's third in the second half and Max Ehmer also scored an own goal to make it 4–1 to the U's. Ehmer later redeemed himself late on to finalise a 4–2 scoreline.

Two days following victory at Carlisle, Sam Walker signed a permanent 18-month contract with the club. The January transfer window also saw the departure of youth-team graduate Freddie Ladapo, who left for Conference club Kidderminster Harriers. Colchester additionally signed Leicester City under-21 captain Alie Sesay on loan until the end of the season to provide cover for Magnus Okuonghae and Tom Eastman.

=== February ===
After three consecutive postponed games due to waterlogged pitches following heavy rain, Colchester played their first game for 24 days when they were visitors at Port Vale on 11 February. The game ended 2–0 to Vale, with two goals from Doug Loft. Colchester's game at Swindon on 14 February went ahead following a pitch inspection less than one hour before kick off. Sanchez Watt, playing on his birthday, was sent off as Colchester held on for a goalless draw.

On 22 February, Colchester played their first home game since 11 January when they faced Preston. After trailing 1–0 at the break, Jabo Ibehre scored his sixth goal of the season to level the score but an own goal from captain Brian Wilson in the final ten minutes of the match gave Preston a 2–1 win. Colchester then suffered another home defeat on 25 February when another late Chris Porter penalty confined them to a 1–0 defeat to Sheffield United.

=== March ===
Colchester lost 2–1 at league leaders Leyton Orient on 1 March. Dave Mooney opened the scoring for the O's on 21 minutes, but Marcus Bean's fourth goal of the season eleven minutes from time levelled the score. Four minutes later Moses Odubajo scored the winner. Sanchez Watt had a goal disallowed and hit the bar during Colchester's 0–0 draw with Rotherham United on 4 March. Colchester then earned their first win in six games with a 2–1 home victory over Coventry on 8 March. Freddie Sears scored after five minutes with his sixth of the season, before Gavin Massey doubled the U's advantage midway through the first-half. Callum Wilson pulled a goal back for the visitors just before half-time but Colchester held on for the win in the second half.

On 11 March, Bradford City won 2–0 at the Community Stadium, followed by a 1–0 defeat at Crawley Town on 15 March. The U's then hosted Shrewsbury on 18 March and beat them 1–0 with Colchester's goal coming from Jabo Ibehre.

Colchester came from two goals down to earn a 2–2 draw with Bristol City on 22 March courtesy of Gavin Massey and Freddie Sears goals. On 25 March, they travelled to Wolverhampton to face leaders Wolves at Molineux Stadium, where the U's found themselves 3–0 down at half-time. A spirited fight back reduced the deficit to just one goal after Alex Gilbey and David Wright's first goals for the club. However, Nouha Dicko completed the scoring in second-half injury time to inflict a 4–2 defeat on Colchester. Colchester were again defeated by Notts County, this time at Meadow Lane on 29 March when they were beaten 2–0, leaving the U's to their fourth consecutive away defeat and only three points above the relegation zone.

=== April ===
Colchester registered no shots on target as their attack faltered during their 2–0 defeat at Peterborough on 2 April. A fourth successive defeat followed at home to Tranmere on 5 April as the visitors won 2–1, Freddie Sears with Colchester's goal. The result left Colchester two places above the relegation zone on goal difference alone. Tranmere had been forced to wear Colchester's gold away kit after the match referee deemed Tranmere's sky blue away kit a clash with the home sides blue and white stripes.

On 12 April, with the club now embroiled in a relegation battle, Colchester face 24th-placed Stevenage. After falling behind in the eleventh minute to a Michael Doughty goal, Colchester led 3–1 by the 73rd-minute after two goals from Freddie Sears and one from Jabo Ibehre. Luke Freeman pulled a goal back in the 89th minute for the home side but they then had Filipe Morais sent off for fighting in stoppage time. The win increased the gap to three points to the relegation zone with only four games of the season remaining. A 1–0 defeat to Oldham on Good Friday put the U's firmly back in the relegation picture, leaving them two points outside of the drop zone. They then drew 0–0 with relegation rivals Crewe Alexandra on Easter Monday to leave both sides just one point clear of the relegation zone.

On 26 April, Colchester effectively sealed their League One status for another season by beating already-promoted Brentford 4–1 in an impressive performance at the Community Stadium. They U's were 3–0 ahead within 41 minutes with goals from Marcus Bean, Alex Wynter and a Freddie Sears penalty. Brentford got a goal back just before the interval, but Sears secured the win in the second half with another goal. Alex Gilbey then brought down Alan Judge in the penalty area but Judge had his resulting spot kick saved by Sam Walker. The result meant that although Colchester were not yet safe, their superior goal difference to the teams surrounding them meant that only a large defeat for the U's the following week at Walsall and high scores for their rivals would spell relegation to League Two.

=== May ===
In their final game of the season, the U's travelled to Walsall and secured a 1–0 victory after James Chambers' attempted clearance struck Craig Eastmond and flew into the net. The win meant Colchester ended the season in 16th position in League One.

== Players ==
As of match played 3 May 2014.

No.	Name	Position	Nationality	Place of birth	Date of birth	Apps	Goals	Signed from	Date signed	Fee
Goalkeepers
1	Mark Cousins	GK	(England)	Chelmsford	9 January 1987 (aged 26)	70	0	Youth team	1 August 2004	Free transfer
29	Shaun Phillips	GK	(England)	Colchester	7 March 1994 (aged 19)	0	0	Academy	1 July 2012	Free transfer
44	Sam Walker	GK	(England)	Gravesend	2 October 1991 (aged 21)	48	0	(England) Chelsea	20 January 2014	Free transfer
	James Bransgrove	GK	(England)	Harlow	12 May 1995 (aged 18)	0	0	(England) Brentford	1 July 2013	Free transfer
Defenders
2	David Wright	FB/DM	(England)	Warrington	1 May 1980 (aged 33)	12	0	(England) Crystal Palace	25 January 2013	Free transfer
3	Ryan Dickson	FB	(England)	Saltash	14 December 1986 (aged 26)	0	0	(England) Southampton	26 July 2013	Free transfer
4	Magnus Okuonghae	CB	(England)	(Nigeria) Lagos	16 February 1986 (aged 27)	157	5	(England) Dagenham & Redbridge	1 July 2009	£60,000
5	Josh Thompson	CB	(England)	Bolton	25 February 1991 (aged 22)	22	1	(England) Portsmouth	1 January 2013	Free transfer
18	Tom Eastman	CB	(England)	Colchester	21 October 1991 (aged 21)	59	5	(England) Ipswich Town	1 July 2011	Free transfer
20	Brian Wilson	FB	(England)	Manchester	9 May 1983 (aged 30)	122	2	(England) Bristol City	29 June 2010	Free transfer
33	Billy Roast	DF	(England)		6 June 1995 (aged 17)	0	0	Youth team	4 July 2011	Free transfer
35	Michael O'Donoghue	DF	(Republic of Ireland)	(England) Islington	18 January 1996 (aged 17)	0	0	Academy	2 July 2012	Free transfer
42	Frankie Kent	CB	(England)	Romford	21 November 1995 (aged 17)	0	0	Academy	2 July 2012	Free transfer
Midfielders
6	Craig Eastmond	MF	(England)	Battersea	9 December 1990 (aged 22)	13	2	(England) Arsenal	1 July 2013	Free transfer
12	Jordan Sanderson	MF	(England)	Chingford	7 August 1993 (aged 19)	1	0	Youth team	1 January 2011	Free transfer
15	Marcus Bean	MF	(Jamaica)	(England) Hammersmith	2 November 1984 (aged 28)	33	0	(England) Brentford	8 June 2012	Free transfer
22	Alex Gilbey	MF	(England)	Dagenham	9 December 1994 (aged 18)	4	0	Youth team	4 July 2011	Free transfer
25	Dominic Vose	AM	(England)	Lambeth	23 November 1993 (aged 19)	0	0	(England) Barnet	1 November 2013	Free transfer
28	Jack Simmons	MF	(Wales)	(England) Basildon	25 November 1994 (aged 18)	0	0	(England) Ipswich Town	25 April 2012	Free transfer
30	Drey Wright	MF	(England)	Greenwich	30 April 1995 (aged 18)	23	3	Youth team	4 July 2011	Free transfer
31	Conor Hubble	AM	(England)	Chelmsford	29 November 1994 (aged 18)	0	0	(England) Queens Park Rangers	1 July 2013	Free transfer
32	Tom Lapslie	MF	(England)	Waltham Forest	5 May 1995 (aged 18)	0	0	Academy	2 July 2012	Free transfer
37	Karl Duguid	MF	(England)	Letchworth	21 March 1978 (aged 35)	470	48	(England) Plymouth Argyle	20 July 2011	Free transfer
40	Sammie Szmodics	AM	(England)	Colchester	24 September 1995 (aged 17)	0	0	Academy	1 October 2013	Free transfer
	Dion Sembie-Ferris	MF/WG	(England)	Peterborough	23 May 1996 (aged 17)	0	0	(England) St Neots Town	25 November 2013	Undisclosed
Forwards
7	Sanchez Watt	ST	(England)	Hackney	14 February 1991 (aged 22)	7	2	(England) Arsenal	1 July 2013	Free transfer
9	Clinton Morrison	FW	(Republic of Ireland)	(England) Tooting	14 May 1979 (aged 34)	35	2	(England) Sheffield Wednesday	16 July 2012	Free transfer
11	Freddie Sears	ST	(England)	Hornchurch	27 November 1989 (aged 23)	48	10	(England) West Ham United	1 July 2012	Free transfer
17	Jabo Ibehre	FW	(England)	Islington	28 January 1983 (aged 30)	31	8	(England) Milton Keynes Dons	21 January 2013	Free transfer
21	Gavin Massey	FW	(England)	Watford	4 October 1992 (aged 20)	49	6	(England) Watford	21 August 2012	Free transfer
23	Tosin Olufemi	WG/FB	(England)	Hackney	13 May 1994 (aged 19)	1	0	Academy	1 July 2012	Free transfer
34	Nnamdi Nwachuku	FW	(Nigeria)		27 November 1994 (aged 18)	0	0	Youth team	4 July 2011	Free transfer
41	Macauley Bonne	ST	(Zimbabwe)	(England) Ipswich	26 October 1995 (aged 17)	0	0	Academy	2 July 2012	Free transfer
Scholars
	Marley Andrews	DF	(England)		9 September 1996 (aged 16)	0	0	Academy	15 July 2013	Free transfer
	Tyler Brampton	MF	(England)		30 January 1997 (aged 16)	0	0	Academy	15 July 2013	Free transfer
	Jack Curtis	MF	(England)	Brentwood	11 September 1995 (aged 17)	0	0	Academy	2 July 2012	Free transfer
	Callum Harrison	MF	(England)		19 March 1997 (aged 16)	0	0	Academy	15 July 2013	Free transfer

== Transfers ==
=== In ===
Date	Position	Nationality	Name	From	Fee	Ref.
20 May 2013	MF	(England)	Craig Eastmond	(England) Arsenal	Free transfer	(Note: Officially joined the club on 1 July 2013)
6 June 2013	FB	(Wales)	Mason Spence	(England) Milton Keynes Dons	Free transfer	
28 June 2013	ST	(England)	Sanchez Watt	(England) Arsenal	Free transfer	
1 July 2013	GK	(England)	James Bransgrove	(England) Brentford	Free transfer	
1 July 2013	AM	(England)	Conor Hubble	(England) Queens Park Rangers	Free transfer	
15 July 2013	DF	(England)	Marley Andrews	Academy	Free transfer	
15 July 2013	MF	(England)	Tyler Brampton	Academy	Free transfer	
15 July 2013	MF	(England)	Callum Harrison	Academy	Free transfer	
26 July 2013	FB	(England)	Ryan Dickson	(England) Southampton	Free transfer	
1 October 2013	AM	(England)	Sammie Szmodics	Academy	Free transfer	
1 November 2013	AM	(England)	Dominic Vose	(England) Barnet	Free transfer	
25 November 2013	MF/WG	(England)	Dion Sembie-Ferris	(England) St Neots Town	Undisclosed	
20 January 2014	GK	(England)	Sam Walker	(England) Chelsea	Free transfer	

- Total spending: ▼ ~ £0

=== Out ===
Date	Position	Nationality	Name	To	Fee	Ref.
3 May 2013	CB	(England)	Matt Heath	(England) Northampton Town (Note: Following Matt Heath's release by Colchester United, he later joined Northampton Town.)	Released	
9 May 2013	FB	(England)	Jackson Ramm	(England) Cambridge City (Note: Following Jackson Ramm's release by Colchester United, he later joined Cambridge City.)	Released	
31 May 2013	DF	(England)	Bradley Hamilton	(England) Concord Rangers (Note: Following Bradley Hamilton's release by Colchester United, he later joined Concord Rangers.)	Released	
16 June 2013	FB	(England)	John White	(England) Southend United (Note: Following John White's rejection of a new deal with Colchester United, he signed a pre-contract agreement with Southend United.)	Free transfer	
30 June 2013	DF	(England)	Gus Mafuta	(England) Bristol City (Note: Following Gus Mafuta's release by Colchester United, he later joined Bristol City.)	Released	
24 July 2013	MF	(Republic of Ireland)	John-Joe O'Toole	(England) Bristol Rovers	Undisclosed	
2 September 2013	MF	(England)	Kemal Izzet	(England) Needham Market (Note: Following Kemal Izzet's release by Colchester United, he later joined Needham Market.)	Released	
1 January 2014	MF	(England)	Andy Bond	(England) Chester (Note: Following Andy Bond's release by Colchester United, he later joined Chester.)	Released	
23 January 2014	ST	(England)	Freddie Ladapo	(England) Kidderminster Harriers	Free transfer	
31 January 2014	MF	(England)	Ryan Melaugh	(England) Bishop's Stortford (Note: Following Ryan Melaugh's release by Colchester United, he later joined Bishop's Stortford.)	Released	
7 March 2014	FB	(Wales)	Mason Spence	(England) St Neots Town (Note: Following Mason Spence's release by Colchester United, he later joined St Neots Town.)	Released	

- Total incoming: ▲ ~ £0

=== Loans in ===
Date	Position	Nationality	Name	From	End date	Ref.
16 July 2013	DF	(Ghana)	Daniel Pappoe	(England) Chelsea	31 October 2013	
19 July 2013	GK	(England)	Sam Walker	(England) Chelsea	19 January 2014	
12 September 2013	WG	(England)	Jeffrey Monakana	(England) Preston North End	13 November 2013	
13 September 2013	FB	(England)	Luke Garbutt	(England) Everton	28 January 2014	
20 September 2013	DF	(Northern Ireland)	Jamie Sendles-White	(England) Queens Park Rangers	20 October 2013	
20 September 2013	DF	(England)	Matt Taylor	(England) Bradford City	20 October 2013	
22 October 2013	ST	(England)	Elliot Lee	(England) West Ham United	21 November 2013	
24 October 2013	CB	(Republic of Ireland)	Cian Bolger	(England) Bolton Wanderers	24 November 2013	
28 November 2013	DF	(England)	Ben Tozer	(England) Northampton Town	23 December 2013	
28 November 2013	WG	(England)	Blair Turgott	(England) West Ham United	4 January 2014	
24 January 2014	DF	(Sierra Leone)	Alie Sesay	(England) Leicester City	4 April 2014	
27 March 2014	DF	(England)	Alex Wynter	(England) Crystal Palace	31 May 2014	

=== Loans out ===
Date	Position	Nationality	Name	To	End date	Ref.
9 August 2013	GK	(England)	Shaun Phillips	(England) Leiston		
16 August 2013	ST	(England)	Freddie Ladapo	(England) Woking	20 September 2013	
13 September 2013	MF	(England)	Andy Bond	(England) Bristol Rovers	13 October 2013	
18 October 2013	MF	(England)	Ryan Melaugh	(England) Needham Market		
1 November 2013	ST	(England)	Freddie Ladapo	(England) Nuneaton Town	1 January 2014	
6 December 2013	ST	(Nigeria)	Nnamdi Nwachuku	(England) Leiston	January 2014	
6 December 2013	MF	(Wales)	Jack Simmons	(England) Leiston	February 2014	
19 December 2013	GK	(England)	Shaun Phillips	(England) Carshalton Athletic		
10 January 2014	AM	(England)	Conor Hubble	(England) Leiston	February 2014	
14 January 2014	FB	(Wales)	Mason Spence	(England) Concord Rangers		
14 March 2014	ST	(Nigeria)	Nnamdi Nwachuku	(England) Bury Town		
20 March 2014	DF	(England)	Billy Roast	(England) Bury Town	April 2014	

=== Contracts ===
New contracts and contract extensions.

Date	Position	Nationality	Name	Length	Expiry	Ref.
1 July 2013	GK	(England)	Mark Cousins	1 year	June 2014	
1 July 2013	MF	(England)	Craig Eastmond	2 years	June 2015	
1 July 2013	FW	(England)	Jabo Ibehre	2 years	June 2015	
1 July 2013	FW	(England)	Freddie Ladapo	1 year	June 2014	
1 July 2013	FB	(Wales)	Mason Spence	1 year	June 2014	
1 July 2013	ST	(England)	Sanchez Watt	2 years	June 2015	
26 July 2013	FB	(England)	Ryan Dickson	1 year	June 2014	
26 July 2013	MF	(England)	Drey Wright	3 years	June 2016	
29 August 2013	WG/FB	(England)	Tosin Olufemi	3 years	June 2016	
1 November 2013	AM	(England)	Dominic Vose	Monthly contract	Monthly contract	
14 January 2014	AM	(England)	Dominic Vose	6 months	June 2014	
16 January 2014	MF	(England)	Alex Gilbey	2½ years	June 2016	
20 January 2014	GK	(England)	Sam Walker	1½ years	June 2015	

== Match details ==
=== Friendlies ===
10 July 2013 Friendly	Heybridge Swifts	1–2	Colchester United	Heybridge
15:00 BST	Unknown goalscorer	Report	Dr. Wright; O'Toole	Stadium: Scraley Road

12 July 2013 Friendly	AFC Sudbury	0–5	Colchester United	Sudbury
19:45 BST		Report	O'Toole; Bean; Roberts; Szmodics	Stadium: King's Marsh

13 July 2013 Friendly	Bishop's Stortford	0–2	Colchester United	Bishop's Stortford
15:00 BST		Report	Morrison (pen.); Massey	Stadium: Woodside Park

16 July 2013 Friendly	Colchester United	1–2	West Ham United	Colchester
19:45 BST	Ibehre 90'	Report	Cole 7'; Collins 55'	Stadium: Colchester Community Stadium; Attendance: 6,610; Referee: Darren Deadman

19 July 2013 Friendly	Colchester United	0–0	Tottenham Hotspur	Colchester
19:00 BST		Report		Stadium: Colchester Community Stadium; Attendance: 9,988; Referee: Mick Russell

20 July 2013 Friendly	Braintree Town	1–4	Colchester United	Braintree
15:00 BST	Marks 61'	Report	Bond 6'; Bean 8'; Ladapo 28'; Melaugh 90'	Stadium: Cressing Road

23 July 2013 Friendly	Colchester United	0–3	Ipswich Town	Colchester
19:45 BST		Report	Chambers 27'; McGoldrick 33'; Murphy 74' (pen.)	Stadium: Colchester Community Stadium; Attendance: 4,585

24 July 2013 Friendly	Histon	0–1	Colchester United	Impington
19:45 BST		Report	Da. Wright 46'	Stadium: Bridge Road

27 July 2013 Friendly	Maldon & Tiptree	1–2	Colchester United	Maldon
15:00 BST	McKenzie 49'	Report	Pappoe 15'; Sears 67'	Stadium: Wallace Binder Ground

27 July 2013 Friendly	Needham Market	0–3	Colchester United	Needham Market
15:00 BST		Report	Bean 33'; Massey 64'; Morrison 90'	Stadium: Bloomfields

=== League One ===
==== League table ====
Pos	Team	Pld	W	D	L	GF	GA	GD	Pts
14	Crawley Town	46	14	15	17	48	54	−6	57
15	Oldham Athletic	46	14	14	18	50	59	−9	56
16	Colchester United	46	13	14	19	53	61	−8	53
17	Gillingham	46	15	8	23	60	79	−19	53
18	Coventry City	46	16	13	17	74	77	−3	51 (Note: On 2 August Coventry City were deducted 10 points for exiting administration without a CVA.)

Updated to match(es) played on 3 May 2014. Source: BBC Sport
Rules for classification: 1) Points; 2) Goal difference; 3) Number of goals scored

==== Results round by round ====
Round	1	2	3	4	5	6	7	8	9	10	11	12	13	14	15	16	17	18	19	20	21	22	23	24	25	26	27	28	29	30	31	32	33	34	35	36	37	38	39	40	41	42	43	44	45	46
Ground	A	H	A	H	H	A	A	H	A	H	H	A	A	H	A	H	A	H	A	H	A	H	H	A	H	A	A	A	H	H	A	H	H	H	A	H	H	A	A	A	H	A	H	A	H	A
Result	W	W	D	D	L	L	D	D	D	L	D	L	D	W	D	L	D	W	L	L	W	W	L	D	W	W	L	D	L	L	L	D	W	L	L	W	D	L	L	L	L	W	L	D	W	W
Position	6	4	5	4	8	10	11	12	13	14	14	14	16	14	14	15	17	15	16	18	15	13	14	14	13	12	14	14	16	17	19	18	15	17	17	17	16	16	18	18	18	18	18	18	18	16

Source: Statto.com (archived)
A = Away; H = Home; W = Win; D = Draw; L = Loss

==== Matches ====
3 August 2013 1	Gillingham	0–1	Colchester United	Gillingham
15:00 BST		Report	Bond 89'	Stadium: Priestfield Stadium; Attendance: 6,792; Referee: Keith Hill

10 August 2013 2	Colchester United	1–0	Port Vale	Colchester
15:00 BST	Massey 74'	Report		Stadium: Colchester Community Stadium; Attendance: 3,201; Referee: Darren Deadman

17 August 2013 3	Sheffield United	1–1	Colchester United	Sheffield
15:00 BST	Maguire 45'	Report	Sears 25'	Stadium: Bramall Lane; Attendance: 17,167; Referee: Richard Clark

23 August 2013 4	Colchester United	1–1	Carlisle United	Colchester
19:45 BST	Sears 71'	Report	Robson 4'	Stadium: Colchester Community Stadium; Attendance: 3,573; Referee: Gavin Ward

31 August 2013 5	Colchester United	1–2	Leyton Orient	Colchester
15:00 BST	Ibehre 35'	Report	Mooney 13'; Lisbie 63'	Stadium: Colchester Community Stadium; Attendance: 5,056; Referee: Andy Woolmer

8 September 2013 6	Coventry City	2–0	Colchester United	Northampton
15:00 BST	Wilson 38', 59'	Report		Stadium: Sixfields Stadium; Attendance: 1,789; Referee: Stephen Martin

14 September 2013 7	Bradford City	2–2	Colchester United	Bradford
15:00 BST	Wells 15', 53'	Report	Monakana 28'; Ibehre 32'; Pappoe (red card) 91'	Stadium: Valley Parade; Attendance: 13,570; Referee: Tony Harrington

21 September 2013 8	Colchester United	1–1	Crawley Town	Colchester
15:00 BST	Sears 6'	Report	Sinclair 32'	Stadium: Colchester Community Stadium; Attendance: 3,031; Referee: Keith Stroud

28 September 2013 9	Bristol City	1–1	Colchester United	Bristol
15:00 BST	Baldock 74'	Report	Taylor 30'	Stadium: Ashton Gate Stadium; Attendance: 10,739; Referee: David Phillips

5 October 2013 10	Colchester United	0–3	Wolverhampton Wanderers	Colchester
15:00 BST		Report	Griffiths 20' (pen.), 48'; Doyle 55'	Stadium: Colchester Community Stadium; Attendance: 7,295; Referee: Tim Robinson

12 October 2013 11	Colchester United	1–1	Walsall	Colchester
15:00 BST	Sears 7'	Report	Taylor 90+7'	Stadium: Colchester Community Stadium; Attendance: 2,945; Referee: Jeremy Simpson

19 October 2013 12	Brentford	3–1	Colchester United	Brentford
15:00 BST	Trotta 76'; Saville 80'; Harris 87'	Report	Okuonghae 49'	Stadium: Griffin Park; Attendance: 5,705; Referee: Brendan Malone

22 October 2013 13	Shrewsbury Town	1–1	Colchester United	Shrewsbury
19:45 BST	López 4'	Report	Bean 44'	Stadium: New Meadow; Attendance: 4,364; Referee: Darren Drysdale

26 October 2013 14	Colchester United	1–0	Peterborough United	Colchester
15:00 BST	Bonne 70'	Report	Tomlin (red card) 54'	Stadium: Colchester Community Stadium; Attendance: 4,149; Referee: Stuart Attwell

2 November 2013 15	Rotherham United	2–2	Colchester United	Rotherham
15:00 GMT	Tubbs 9'; Agard 22'	Report	Bean 7'; Lee 90+4'	Stadium: New York Stadium; Attendance: 7,096; Referee: Seb Stockbridge

16 November 2013 16	Colchester United	1–2	Swindon Town	Colchester
15:00 GMT	Okuonghae 78'	Report	Ajose 28'; N'Guessan 47'	Stadium: Colchester Community Stadium; Attendance: 3,334; Referee: Graham Horwood

23 November 2013 17	Preston North End	1–1	Colchester United	Preston
15:00 GMT	Garner 45'	Report	Garbutt 76'	Stadium: Deepdale; Attendance: 8,492; Referee: Scott Duncan

26 November 2013 18	Colchester United	3–1	Milton Keynes Dons	Colchester
19:45 GMT	Eastmond 20'; Ibehre 44'; Bonne 78'	Report	Spence 56'	Stadium: Colchester Community Stadium; Attendance: 2,597; Referee: Tim Robinson

30 November 2013 19	Tranmere Rovers	2–1	Colchester United	Birkenhead
15:00 GMT	Lowe 32', 56' (pen.)	Report	Morrison 90'	Stadium: Prenton Park; Attendance: 4,148; Referee: Dean Whitestone

14 December 2013 20	Colchester United	0–4	Notts County	Colchester
15:00 GMT		Report	Grealish 30'; Fox 43'; McGregor 86'; Liddle 89'	Stadium: Colchester Community Stadium; Attendance: 2,961; Referee: Simon Hooper

21 December 2013 21	Oldham Athletic	0–2	Colchester United	Oldham
15:00 GMT		Report	Plummer 8' (o.g.); Ibehre 32'	Stadium: Boundary Park; Attendance: 4,036; Referee: Tony Harrington

26 December 2013 22	Colchester United	4–0	Stevenage	Colchester
15:00 GMT	Turgott 10'; Ibehre 14'; Eastmond 24', 77'	Report		Stadium: Colchester Community Stadium; Attendance: 3,919; Referee: Gavin Ward

29 December 2013 23	Colchester United	1–2	Crewe Alexandra	Colchester
15:00 GMT	Garbutt 29'	Report	Aneke 73'; Hitchcock 76'	Stadium: Colchester Community Stadium; Attendance: 3,430; Referee: Lee Collins

1 January 2014 24	Milton Keynes Dons	0–0	Colchester United	Milton Keynes
15:00 GMT		Report		Stadium: Stadium MK; Attendance: 7,879; Referee: Charles Breakspear

4 January 2014	Port Vale	P–P	Colchester United	Burslem
15:00 GMT		Report		Stadium: Vale Park
Note: Match postponed due to Port Vale's involvement in the third round of the FA Cup.

11 January 2014 25	Colchester United	3–0	Gillingham	Colchester
15:00 GMT	Watt 50'; Morrison 87'; Sears 90'	Report		Stadium: Colchester Community Stadium; Attendance: 3,819; Referee: Darren Drysdale

18 January 2014 26	Carlisle United	2–4	Colchester United	Carlisle
15:00 GMT	Okuonghae 19' (o.g.); Ehmer 90'	Report	Watt 16', 45'; Bean 68'; Ehmer 75' (o.g.)	Stadium: Brunton Park; Attendance: 3,688; Referee: Chris Sarginson

25 January 2014	Colchester United	P–P	Sheffield United	Colchester
15:00 GMT		Report		Stadium: Colchester Community Stadium
Note: Match postponed due to Sheffield United's involvement in the fourth round of the FA Cup.

28 January 2014	Colchester United	P–P	Shrewsbury Town	Colchester
19:45 GMT		Report		Stadium: Colchester Community Stadium
Note: Match postponed due to a waterlogged pitch.

1 February 2014	Peterborough United	P–P	Colchester United	Peterborough
15:00 GMT		Report		Stadium: London Road Stadium
Note: Match postponed due to a waterlogged pitch.

8 February 2014	Colchester United	P–P	Rotherham United	Colchester
15:00 GMT		Report		Stadium: Colchester Community Stadium
Note: Match postponed due to a waterlogged pitch.

11 February 2014 27	Port Vale	2–0	Colchester United	Burslem
19:45 GMT	Loft 15', 53'	Report		Stadium: Vale Park; Attendance: 3,734; Referee: Andy Haines

14 February 2014 28	Swindon Town	0–0	Colchester United	Swindon
19:45 GMT		Report	Watt (yellow card) 70' (red card)	Stadium: County Ground; Attendance: 6,683; Referee: Darren Sheldrake

22 February 2014 29	Colchester United	1–2	Preston North End	Colchester
15:00 GMT	Ibehre 55'	Report	Clarke 28'; Wilson 82' (o.g.)	Stadium: Colchester Community Stadium; Attendance: 3,416; Referee: David Phillips

25 February 2014 30	Colchester United	0–1	Sheffield United	Colchester
19:45 GMT		Report	Porter 87' (pen.)	Stadium: Colchester Community Stadium; Attendance: 3,088; Referee: Graham Scott

1 March 2014 31	Leyton Orient	2–1	Colchester United	Leyton
15:00 GMT	Mooney 21'; Odubajo 83'	Report	Bean 80'	Stadium: Brisbane Road; Attendance: 6,323; Referee: David Webb

4 March 2014 32	Colchester United	0–0	Rotherham United	Colchester
19:45 GMT		Report		Stadium: Colchester Community Stadium; Attendance: 2,655; Referee: Brendan Malone

8 March 2014 33	Colchester United	2–1	Coventry City	Colchester
15:00 GMT	Sears 5'; Massey 26'	Report	Wilson 45'	Stadium: Colchester Community Stadium; Attendance: 4,426; Referee: Trevor Kettle

11 March 2014 34	Colchester United	0–2	Bradford City	Colchester
19:45 GMT		Report	Hanson 16'; Bennett 56'	Stadium: Colchester Community Stadium; Attendance: 2,605; Referee: Dean Whitestone

15 March 2014 35	Crawley Town	1–0	Colchester United	Crawley
15:00 GMT	M. Jones 41'	Report		Stadium: Broadfield Stadium; Attendance: 3,182; Referee: Chris Sarginson

18 March 2014 36	Colchester United	1–0	Shrewsbury Town	Colchester
19:45 GMT	Ibehre 56'	Report		Stadium: Colchester Community Stadium; Attendance: 2,508; Referee: Gary Sutton

22 March 2014 37	Colchester United	2–2	Bristol City	Colchester
15:00 GMT	Massey 73'; Sears 79'	Report	Paterson 8'; Wagstaff 49'	Stadium: Colchester Community Stadium; Attendance: 3,805; Referee: Steve Rushton

25 March 2014 38	Wolverhampton Wanderers	4–2	Colchester United	Wolverhampton
19:45 GMT	Jacobs 1'; Edwards 27'; Henry 44'; Dicko 90+4'	Report	Gilbey 59'; Da. Wright 72'	Stadium: Molineux Stadium; Attendance: 17,041; Referee: Andy Woolmer

29 March 2014 39	Notts County	2–0	Colchester United	Nottingham
15:00 GMT	Murray 5'; Hollis 47'	Report		Stadium: Meadow Lane; Attendance: 5,230; Referee: Lee Collins

2 April 2014 40	Peterborough United	2–0	Colchester United	Peterborough
19:45 BST	Rowe 26'; Assombalonga 65'	Report		Stadium: London Road Stadium; Attendance: 4,434; Referee: Darren Bond

5 April 2014 41	Colchester United	1–2	Tranmere Rovers	Colchester
15:00 BST	Sears 45'	Report	Akpa Akpro 36'; Lowe 63'	Stadium: Colchester Community Stadium; Attendance: 3,443; Referee: Andy Davies

12 April 2014 42	Stevenage	2–3	Colchester United	Stevenage
15:00 BST	Doughty 11'; Freeman 89'; Morais (red card) 93'	Report	Sears 45', 73'; Ibehre 50'	Stadium: Broadhall Way; Attendance: 3,108; Referee: Mark Heywood

18 April 2014 43	Colchester United	0–1	Oldham Athletic	Colchester
15:00 BST		Report	Brown 45'	Stadium: Colchester Community Stadium; Attendance: 4,252; Referee: Carl Berry

21 April 2014 44	Crewe Alexandra	0–0	Colchester United	Crewe
15:00 BST		Report		Stadium: Gresty Road; Attendance: 4,603; Referee: Kevin Wright

26 April 2014 45	Colchester United	4–1	Brentford	Colchester
15:00 BST	Bean 29'; Wynter 32'; Sears 43' (pen.), 65'	Report	Dallas 45'	Stadium: Colchester Community Stadium; Attendance: 6,400; Referee: Mark Brown

3 May 2014 46	Walsall	0–1	Colchester United	Walsall
15:00 BST		Report	Eastmond 54'	Stadium: Bescot Stadium; Attendance: 4,271; Referee: David Webb

=== Football League Cup ===
6 August 2013 1st round	Colchester United	1–5	Peterborough United	Colchester
19:45 BST	Ibehre 47'	Report	Zakuani 42'; Barnett 59'; Rowe 68'; Tomlin 71', 80'	Stadium: Colchester Community Stadium; Attendance: 2,368; Referee: Trevor Kettle

=== Football League Trophy ===
3 September 2013 1st round (southern section)	Dagenham & Redbridge	4–1	Colchester United	Dagenham
19:00 BST	Elito 53'; Saah 64'; Ogogo 78'; Dennis 85'	Report	Wilson 38'; Okuonghae (yellow card) 63' (red card)	Stadium: Victoria Road; Attendance: 1,050; Referee: Charles Breakspear

=== FA Cup ===
9 November 2013 1st round	Colchester United	2–3	Sheffield United	Colchester
15:00 GMT	Bonne 48'; Garbutt 64'	Report	Maguire 10'; Walker 12' (o.g.); Porter 81' (pen.)	Stadium: Colchester Community Stadium; Attendance: 2,509; Referee: Phil Gibbs

== Squad statistics ==
=== Appearances and goals ===
No.	Pos	Nat	Player	Total		League One		FA Cup		League Cup		Football League Trophy	
No.	Pos	Nat	Player	Apps	Goals	Apps	Goals	Apps	Goals	Apps	Goals	Apps	Goals
2	DF	(England) ENG	David Wright	37	1	33+2	1	0	0	1	0	0+1	0
3	DF	(England) ENG	Ryan Dickson	35	0	28+4	0	0+1	0	1	0	1	0
4	DF	(England) ENG	Magnus Okuonghae	47	2	44	2	1	0	1	0	1	0
5	DF	(England) ENG	Josh Thompson	1	0	0	0	0	0	0	0	0+1	0
6	MF	(England) ENG	Craig Eastmond	42	4	32+7	4	1	0	1	0	1	0
7	FW	(England) ENG	Sanchez Watt	23	3	19+3	3	0	0	0+1	0	0	0
9	FW	(Republic of Ireland) IRL	Clinton Morrison	36	2	17+16	2	1	0	1	0	1	0
11	FW	(England) ENG	Freddie Sears	32	12	25+7	12	0	0	0	0	0	0
12	MF	(England) ENG	Jordan Sanderson	1	0	0+1	0	0	0	0	0	0	0
15	MF	(Jamaica) JAM	Marcus Bean	36	5	31+4	5	1	0	0	0	0	0
17	FW	(England) ENG	Jabo Ibehre	39	9	32+5	8	0	0	1	1	0+1	0
18	DF	(England) ENG	Tom Eastman	39	0	36	0	1	0	1	0	1	0
20	DF	(England) ENG	Brian Wilson	41	1	38	0	1	0	1	0	1	1
21	FW	(England) ENG	Gavin Massey	31	3	22+8	3	0	0	0	0	1	0
22	MF	(England) ENG	Alex Gilbey	39	1	26+10	1	1	0	1	0	1	0
23	FW	(England) ENG	Tosin Olufemi	14	0	5+8	0	0	0	0	0	1	0
25	MF	(England) ENG	Dominic Vose	28	0	19+8	0	0+1	0	0	0	0	0
30	MF	(England) ENG	Drey Wright	13	0	2+10	0	0	0	0+1	0	0	0
31	MF	(England) ENG	Conor Hubble	1	0	0+1	0	0	0	0	0	0	0
37	MF	(England) ENG	Karl Duguid	1	0	0+1	0	0	0	0	0	0	0
40	MF	(England) ENG	Sammie Szmodics	8	0	0+7	0	0+1	0	0	0	0	0
41	FW	(Zimbabwe) ZIM	Macauley Bonne	15	3	2+12	2	1	1	0	0	0	0
42	DF	(England) ENG	Frankie Kent	1	0	0+1	0	0	0	0	0	0	0
44	GK	(England) ENG	Sam Walker	49	0	46	0	1	0	1	0	1	0
Players who appeared for Colchester who left during the season
14	MF	(England) ENG	Andy Bond	11	1	0+8	1	1	0	1	0	1	0
16	FW	(England) ENG	Jeffrey Monakana	9	1	6+3	1	0	0	0	0	0	0
16	FW	(England) ENG	Blair Turgott	4	1	3+1	1	0	0	0	0	0	0
16	DF	(England) ENG	Alex Wynter	6	1	5+1	1	0	0	0	0	0	0
19	FW	(England) ENG	Freddie Ladapo	2	0	0+2	0	0	0	0	0	0	0
25	DF	(Ghana) GHA	Daniel Pappoe	2	0	0+2	0	0	0	0	0	0	0
26	DF	(Wales) WAL	Mason Spence	1	0	0+1	0	0	0	0	0	0	0
27	DF	(England) ENG	Luke Garbutt	20	3	19	2	1	1	0	0	0	0
38	FW	(England) ENG	Elliot Lee	4	1	4	1	0	0	0	0	0	0
39	DF	(Republic of Ireland) IRL	Cian Bolger	4	0	4	0	0	0	0	0	0	0
39	DF	(Sierra Leone) SLE	Alie Sesay	3	0	2+1	0	0	0	0	0	0	0
39	DF	(England) ENG	Matt Taylor	5	1	5	1	0	0	0	0	0	0
39	DF	(England) ENG	Ben Tozer	1	0	1	0	0	0	0	0	0	0

=== Goalscorers ===
Place	Number	Nationality	Position	Name	League One	FA Cup	League Cup	Football League Trophy	Total
1	11	(England)	ST	Freddie Sears	12	0	0	0	12
2	17	(England)	FW	Jabo Ibehre	8	0	1	0	9
3	15	(Jamaica)	MF	Marcus Bean	5	0	0	0	5
4	6	(England)	MF	Craig Eastmond	4	0	0	0	4
5	7	(England)	ST	Sanchez Watt	3	0	0	0	3
5	21	(England)	FW	Gavin Massey	3	0	0	0	3
5	27	(England)	FB	Luke Garbutt	2	1	0	0	3
5	41	(Zimbabwe)	ST	Macauley Bonne	2	1	0	0	3
9	4	(England)	CB	Magnus Okuonghae	2	0	0	0	2
9	9	(Republic of Ireland)	FW	Clinton Morrison	2	0	0	0	2
11	2	(England)	FB/DM	David Wright	1	0	0	0	1
11	14	(England)	MF	Andy Bond	1	0	0	0	1
11	16	(England)	WG	Jeffrey Monakana	1	0	0	0	1
11	16	(England)	WG	Blair Turgott	1	0	0	0	1
11	16	(England)	DF	Alex Wynter	1	0	0	0	1
11	20	(England)	FB	Brian Wilson	0	0	0	1	1
11	22	(England)	MF	Alex Gilbey	1	0	0	0	1
11	38	(England)	ST	Elliot Lee	1	0	0	0	1
11	39	(England)	DF	Matt Taylor	1	0	0	0	1
				Own goals	2	0	0	0	2
				TOTALS	53	2	1	1	57

=== Disciplinary record ===
Number	Nationality	Position	Name	League One		FA Cup		League Cup		Football League Trophy		Total	
Number	Nationality	Position	Name	Booked	Sent off (straight red)	Booked	Sent off (straight red)	Booked	Sent off (straight red)	Booked	Sent off (straight red)	Booked	Sent off (straight red)
20	(England)	FB	Brian Wilson	10	0	0	0	0	0	1	0	11	0
6	(England)	MF	Craig Eastmond	9	0	0	0	0	0	1	0	10	0
15	(Jamaica)	MF	Marcus Bean	9	0	1	0	0	0	0	0	10	0
4	(England)	CB	Magnus Okuonghae	4	0	0	0	0	0	1	1	5	1
7	(England)	ST	Sanchez Watt	3	1	0	0	0	0	0	0	3	1
22	(England)	MF	Alex Gilbey	6	0	0	0	0	0	0	0	6	0
27	(England)	FB	Luke Garbutt	4	0	1	0	0	0	0	0	5	0
3	(England)	FB	Ryan Dickson	3	0	0	0	1	0	0	0	4	0
9	(Republic of Ireland)	FW	Clinton Morrison	4	0	0	0	0	0	0	0	4	0
18	(England)	CB	Tom Eastman	4	0	0	0	0	0	0	0	4	0
25	(Ghana)	DF	Daniel Pappoe	0	1	0	0	0	0	0	0	0	1
2	(England)	FB/DM	David Wright	2	0	0	0	0	0	0	0	2	0
11	(England)	ST	Freddie Sears	2	0	0	0	0	0	0	0	2	0
17	(England)	FW	Jabo Ibehre	2	0	0	0	0	0	0	0	2	0
23	(England)	WG/FB	Tosin Olufemi	2	0	0	0	0	0	0	0	2	0
39	(Republic of Ireland)	CB	Cian Bolger	2	0	0	0	0	0	0	0	2	0
16	(England)	DF	Alex Wynter	1	0	0	0	0	0	0	0	1	0
25	(England)	AM	Dominic Vose	1	0	0	0	0	0	0	0	1	0
38	(England)	ST	Elliot Lee	1	0	0	0	0	0	0	0	1	0
39	(Sierra Leone)	DF	Alie Sesay	1	0	0	0	0	0	0	0	1	0
44	(England)	GK	Sam Walker	1	0	0	0	0	0	0	0	1	0
			TOTALS	71	2	2	0	1	0	3	1	77	3

=== Captains ===
Number of games played as team captain.

Place	Number	Nationality	Position	Player	League One	FA Cup	League Cup	Football League Trophy	Total
1	20	(England)	FB	Brian Wilson	38	1	1	1	41
2	4	(England)	CB	Magnus Okuonghae	4	0	0	0	4
3	2	(England)	FB/DM	David Wright	3	0	0	0	3
4	9	(Republic of Ireland)	FW	Clinton Morrison	1	0	0	0	1
				TOTALS	46	1	1	1	49

=== Clean sheets ===
Number of games goalkeepers kept a clean sheet.

Place	Number	Nationality	Player	League One	FA Cup	League Cup	Football League Trophy	Total
1	44	(England)	Sam Walker	12	0	0	0	12
			TOTALS	12	0	0	0	12

=== Player debuts ===
Players making their first-team Colchester United debut in a fully competitive match.

Number	Position	Nationality	Player	Date	Opponent	Ground	Notes
3	FB	(England)	Ryan Dickson	3 August 2013	Gillingham	Priestfield Stadium	
6	MF	(England)	Craig Eastmond	3 August 2013	Gillingham	Priestfield Stadium	(Note: Second debut for the club)
44	GK	(England)	Sam Walker	3 August 2013	Gillingham	Priestfield Stadium	
7	ST	(England)	Sanchez Watt	6 August 2013	Peterborough United	Colchester Community Stadium	
26	FB	(Wales)	Mason Spence	8 September 2013	Coventry City	Sixfields Stadium	
16	WG	(England)	Jeffrey Monakana	14 September 2013	Bradford City	Valley Parade	
25	DF	(Ghana)	Daniel Pappoe	14 September 2013	Bradford City	Valley Parade	
27	FB	(England)	Luke Garbutt	14 September 2013	Bradford City	Valley Parade	
31	AM	(England)	Conor Hubble	21 September 2013	Crawley Town	Colchester Community Stadium	
39	DF	(England)	Matt Taylor	21 September 2013	Crawley Town	Colchester Community Stadium	
40	AM	(England)	Sammie Szmodics	28 September 2013	Bristol City	Ashton Gate Stadium	
38	ST	(England)	Elliot Lee	22 October 2013	Shrewsbury Town	New Meadow	
41	ST	(Zimbabwe)	Macauley Bonne	22 October 2013	Shrewsbury Town	New Meadow	
39	CB	(Republic of Ireland)	Cian Bolger	26 October 2013	Peterborough United	Colchester Community Stadium	
25	AM	(England)	Dominic Vose	9 November 2013	Sheffield United	Colchester Community Stadium	
16	WG	(England)	Blair Turgott	14 December 2013	Notts County	Colchester Community Stadium	
39	DF	(England)	Ben Tozer	14 December 2013	Notts County	Colchester Community Stadium	
44	GK	(England)	Sam Walker	11 February 2014	Port Vale	Vale Park	(Note: Third debut for the club)
39	DF	(Sierra Leone)	Alie Sesay	25 February 2014	Sheffield United	Colchester Community Stadium	
16	DF	(England)	Alex Wynter	5 April 2014	Tranmere Rovers	Colchester Community Stadium	
42	CB	(England)	Frankie Kent	3 May 2014	Walsall	Bescot Stadium	

== Honours and awards ==
Players to receive awards at the club's End of Season Awards Dinner held on 9 May 2014.

Award	Player	Notes
Colchester United Player of the Year award	(England) Tom Eastman	
Young Player of the Year award	(England) Alex Gilbey	
Players' Player of the Year award	(England) Tom Eastman	
Community Player of the Year award	(England) David Wright	
Colchester United Supporters Association Home Player of the Year award	(England) Sam Walker	
Colchester United Supporters Association Away Player of the Year award	(England) Sam Walker	

== See also ==
- List of Colchester United F.C. seasons
