= Dominic Vose =

English footballer

Personal information
- Full name: Dominic Jack Spencer Vose
- Date of birth: 23 November 1993 (age 32)
- Place of birth: Lambeth, London, England
- Height: 1.73 m (5 ft 8 in)
- Position: Attacking midfielder

Team information
- Current team: East Grinstead Town

Youth career
- Fulham
- 2010: West Ham United

Senior career*
Years	Team	Apps	(Gls)
2010–2012	West Ham United	0	(0)
2011	→ Braintree Town (loan)	5	(0)
2012–2013	Tooting & Mitcham United	4	(1)
2013	Barnet	2	(0)
2013–2014	Colchester United	34	(0)
2015	Welling United	16	(5)
2015–2016	Wrexham	28	(10)
2016–2017	Scunthorpe United	2	(0)
2016–2017	→ Grimsby Town (loan)	23	(2)
2017	Whitehawk	3	(0)
2017–2018	Bromley	6	(1)
2018	Chester	11	(1)
2018–2020	Dulwich Hamlet	63	(2)
2020	Kingstonian	2	(0)
2020	Margate	0	(0)
2020–2021	Radcliffe	0	(0)
2021	Welling United	1	(0)
2021–2022	Magni Grenivík	7	(3)
2022	Europa	1	(0)
2023–2024	Hastings United	10	(1)
2024	Margate	4	(0)
2024	Carshalton Athletic	24	(3)
2025	AFC Whyteleafe	4	(0)
2025–	East Grinstead Town	5	(0)
- * Club domestic league appearances and goals as of 20:54, 31 December 2025 (UTC)

Dominic Jack Spencer Vose (born 23 November 1993) is an English professional footballer who plays as an attacking midfielder for Southern Combination Premier Division club East Grinstead Town.

Vose has previously played in the Football League for Barnet, Colchester United, Scunthorpe United and Grimsby Town, having begun his professional career with Fulham and then West Ham United. He has played at Non-league level for Braintree Town, Tooting & Mitcham United, Welling United, Wrexham, Whitehawk, Bromley, Chester, Dulwich Hamlet, Kingstonian, Margate and Radcliffe, as well as a spell in Iceland with Magni Grenivík.

== Career ==
Born in Lambeth, Vose came through the youth system at Fulham, and during his time there, had trials at Manchester United and Arsenal. He later joined West Ham United, making his debut for their reserves at the age of 16 before signing his first professional contract on his 17th birthday. He joined Braintree Town in the Conference Premier on loan for one month in October 2011.

Vose was released by West Ham in December 2012. Later that month, he signed for Tooting & Mitcham United, scoring one goal in four appearances. In January 2013, Vose went on trial with Stoke City, before signing a one-year deal at Barnet in February 2013. He made two appearances for Barnet in Football League Two; his debut as a 90th-minute substitute for Jon Nurse in a 2–0 win over Fleetwood Town on 19 March 2013, and his second when he came on as substitute on the final day of the season against Northampton Town. He left Barnet by mutual consent in August 2013.

On 1 November 2013, Vose signed for Colchester United on a monthly contract after impressing on trial with the club. He made his debut for the U's as a substitute for Craig Eastmond in the club's FA Cup first round defeat to Sheffield United on 9 November 2013. After making his first league appearance as a substitute for Ryan Dickson during a 1–1 draw with Preston North End on 23 November, Vose made his first start for Colchester on 26 November in a 3–1 win against Milton Keynes Dons three days later, before being substituted for eventual goalscorer Macauley Bonne on 68 minutes. In January 2014, Vose signed a contract with Colchester until the end of the season. He then extended his stay with the club by signing a two-year contract in May 2014. However, after making only a handful of appearances under new Colchester manager Tony Humes, Vose agreed to cancel his contract with the club by mutual consent on 2 December 2014 in order to seek first team football elsewhere.

=== Wrexham ===
In May 2015, he signed for National League club Wrexham on a one-year deal. He made his debut in the first game of the 2015–16 season for Wrexham in the 3–1 away defeat to Bromley.

On 14 November 2015, Vose scored a goal hailed as the greatest in Wrexham's history, picking up the ball just inside the opposition half, dribbling past five players before firing home past the goalkeeper.

=== Scunthorpe United ===
On 1 February 2016, Vose signed a 2 1/2-year contract with League One side Scunthorpe United for an undisclosed fee. Prior to him signing on transfer deadline day, a bid from rival National League side Grimsby Town was allegedly accepted, but apparently Vose wasn't willing to make the move, initially wanting to play out the season at Wrexham. However, later on, a statement by the Chief Executive at Wrexham denied Vose's claims that the Dragons had accepted a Mariners' bid: "We had an offer (from Grimsby) and they were being considered, but nothing had been accepted formally," adding that the decision to let him leave was purely for footballing reasons, earning a move to a club two divisions higher in the pyramid.

Vose made his debut for the club on 5 March 2016, coming on as a substitute on 85 minutes in the 0–0 draw at home to Gillingham. His only other appearance for the 2015–16 season was on 2 April 2016 in the 1–0 away defeat to Bradford City, coming off the bench in the 81st minute.

Vose continued to struggle to break into the first-team and signed a season-long loan with newly promoted League Two side Grimsby Town, which would keep him there until the end of the 2016–17 season. Scunthorpe released him at the end of the season.

=== Non-league ===
After being without a club for the start of the 2017–2018 season, Vose signed for National League South Whitehawk in October 2017. Following his departure from Whitehawk, Vose trained with Bromley and eventually signed for the club on 10 November, making his debut the following day and earning an injury time assist in a 1–0 win away to Guiseley. In February 2018 Vose joined Chester on a non-contract basis, being paid only expenses. He made 11 appearances, scoring one goal.

Vose spent the following two seasons with Dulwich Hamlet in the National League South. In September 2020, he signed for Isthmian League side Kingstonian. After only two appearances, Vose joined Margate on 2 November 2020. He left the club later that month without making an appearance. On 22 December, Radcliffe announced that they had signed Vose. On 22 January 2021, Vose signed for National League South side Welling United.

=== Europe ===
In 2021, Vose had a spell in Iceland with Magni Grenivík, before on 28 January 2022 signing for Europa of the Gibraltar National League.

=== Return to England ===
Vose returned to England in June 2023, signing for Isthmian League Premier Division side Hastings United, departing the club four months later. In January 2024, he returned to former club Margate. He joined Carshalton Athletic the following month.

In June 2025, Vose joined newly promoted Isthmian League South East Division side AFC Whyteleafe. In December 2025, he joined East Grinstead Town.

== Career statistics ==
As of 27 December 2025

Appearances and goals by club, season and competition
Club	Season	League			National cup		League cup		Other		Total	
Club	Season	Division	Apps	Goals	Apps	Goals	Apps	Goals	Apps	Goals	Apps	Goals
West Ham United	2010–11	Premier League	0	0	0	0	0	0	0	0	0	0
West Ham United	2011–12	Championship	0	0	0	0	0	0	0	0	0	0
West Ham United	Total		0	0	0	0	0	0	0	0	0	0
Braintree Town (loan)	2011–12	Conference Premier	5	0	0	0	0	0	0	0	5	0
Tooting & Mitcham United	2012–13	IL Division One South	4	1	0	0	0	0	0	0	4	1
Barnet	2012–13	League Two	2	0	0	0	0	0	0	0	2	0
Colchester United	2013–14	League One	27	0	1	0	0	0	0	0	28	0
Colchester United	2014–15	League One	7	0	0	0	1	0	0	0	8	0
Colchester United	Total		34	0	1	0	1	0	0	0	36	0
Welling United	2014–15	National League	16	5	0	0	—		0	0	16	5
Wrexham	2015–16	National League	28	10	1	0	—		2 (Note: Appearance(s) in FA Trophy)	1	31	11
Scunthorpe United	2015–16	League One	2	0	0	0	0	0	0	0	2	0
Grimsby Town (loan)	2016–17	League Two	23	2	0	0	1	0	2 (Note: Appearance(s) in EFL Trophy)	0	26	2
Whitehawk	2017–18	National League South	3	0	0	0	—		0	0	3	0
Bromley	2017–18	National League	6	1	0	0	—		1	0	7	1
Chester	2017–18	National League	11	1	0	0	—		0	0	11	1
Dulwich Hamlet	2018–19	National League South	38	1	2	0	—		2	0	42	1
Dulwich Hamlet	2019–20	National League South	25	1	3	0	—		4 (Note: Three appearances in FA Trophy, one appearance and one goal in London Senior Cup)	1	32	2
Dulwich Hamlet	Total		63	2	5	0	—		6	1	74	3
Kingstonian	2020–21	IL Premier Division	2	0	0	0	—		0	0	2	0
Margate	2020–21	IL Premier Division	0	0	0	0	—		0	0	0	0
Radcliffe	2020–21	NPL Premier Division	0	0	0	0	—		0	0	0	0
Whitehawk	2020–21	National League South	1	0	0	0	—		0	0	1	0
Magni Grenivík	2021	2. deild karla	7	3	1	0	0	0	0	0	8	3
Europa	2021–22	Gibraltar Football League	1	0	1	0	—		0	0	2	0
Hastings United	2023–24	IL Premier Division	10	1	3	0	—		0	0	13	1
Margate	2023–24	IL Premier Division	4	0	—		—		0	0	4	0
Carshalton Athletic	2023–24	IL Premier Division	11	0	—		—		0	0	11	0
Carshalton Athletic	2024–25	Isthmian League Premier Division	13	3	4	1	—		3 (Note: One appearance in FA Trophy, one appearance in Surrey Senior Cup, one appearance in Alan Turvey Trophy)	0	20	4
Carshalton Athletic	Total		24	3	4	1	0	0	3	0	31	4
AFC Whyteleafe	2025–26	Isthmian League South East Division	4	0	2	1	—		2 (Note: One appearance in FA Trophy, one appearance in Alan Turvey Trophy)	0	8	1
East Grinstead Town	2025–26	Isthmian League South East Division	5	0	0	0	—		0	0	5	0
Career total			255	29	18	2	2	0	16	2	291	33
