= Jeffrey Monakana =

English footballer

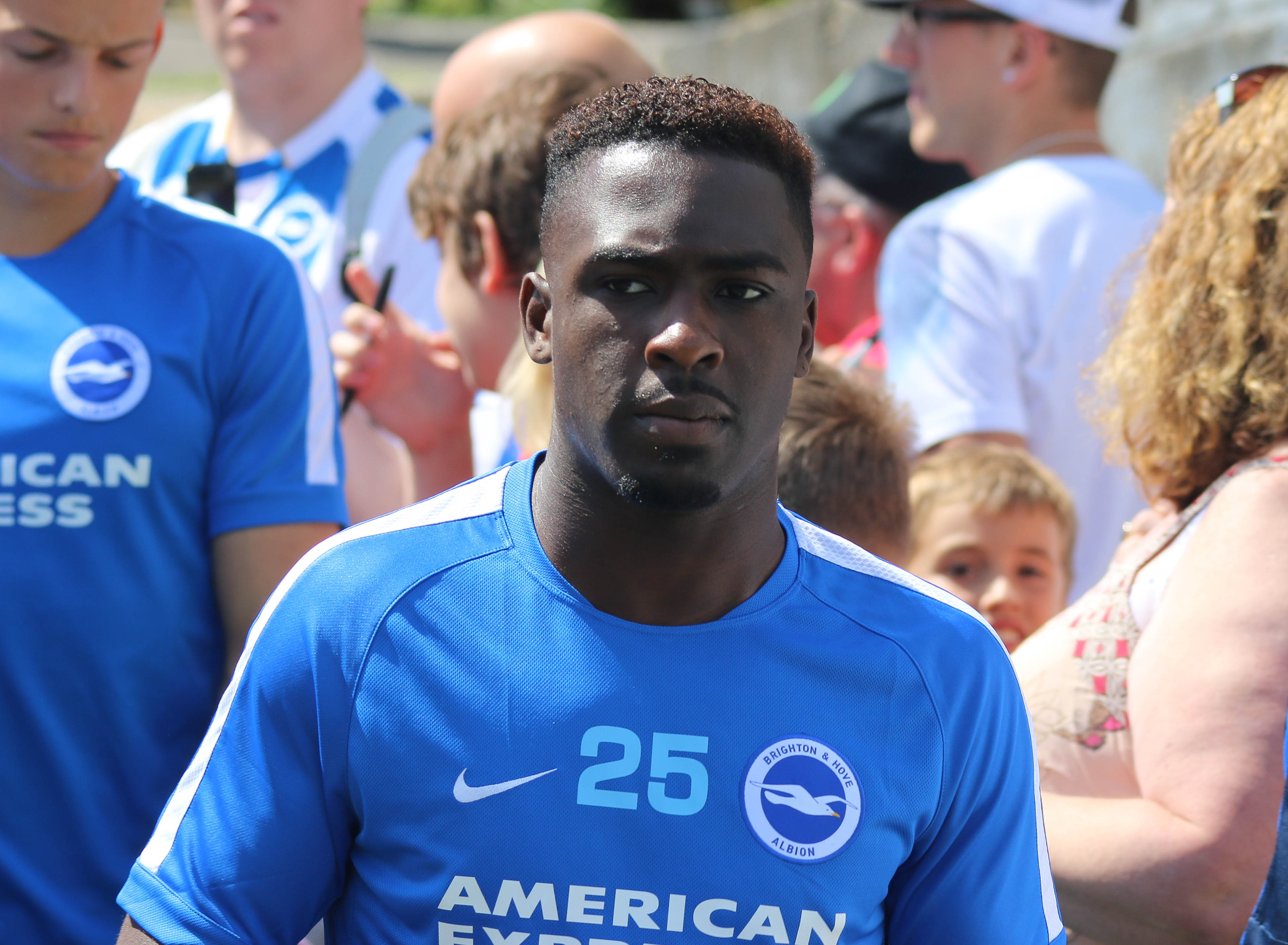
- Monakana pictured in 2015 pre-season

Personal information
- Full name: Jeffrey Monakana
- Date of birth: 5 November 1993 (age 33)
- Place of birth: Edmonton, England
- Position: Midfielder

Youth career
- 2002–2012: Arsenal

Senior career*
| Years | Team | Apps | (Gls) |
| 2012–2014 | Preston North End | 40 | (4) |
| 2013 | → Colchester United (loan) | 9 | (1) |
| 2014–2016 | Brighton & Hove Albion | 0 | (0) |
| 2014 | → Crawley Town (loan) | 4 | (0) |
| 2014–2015 | → Aberdeen (loan) | 10 | (0) |
| 2015 | → Mansfield Town (loan) | 6 | (0) |
| 2015 | → Carlisle United (loan) | 1 | (0) |
| 2015 | → Bristol Rovers (loan) | 3 | (0) |
| 2016 | FC Voluntari | 3 | (0) |
| 2016–2017 | Sutton United | 5 | (0) |
| 2017 | → Margate (loan) | 5 | (0) |
| 2017 | → Welling United (loan) | 14 | (1) |
| 2017–2018 | Welling United | 1 | (0) |
| 2018–2019 | Wealdstone | 37 | (4) |
| 2019–2020 | Dulwich Hamlet | 27 | (4) |
| 2020 | Fjölnir | 4 | (0) |
| 2021–2022 | Magni Grenivík | 8 | (5) |
| Total | | 177 | (19) |
- * Club domestic league appearances and goals

Jeffrey Monakana (born 5 November 1993) is an English former professional footballer who played as a midfielder.

== Career ==
Monakana progressed through the youth system at Arsenal, then finally in 2008, At the age of 14, Monakana was handed a four-year contract.

Monakana signed a one-year deal with Preston North End on 31 May 2012, effective from 1 July 2012. The 18-year-old winger became the ninth summer signing for Preston manager Graham Westley. Monakana performed well in pre-season, notably his contributions against Athens and Wimbledon.

He made his full debut in a home League Cup tie against Huddersfield Town, on 13 August 2012, Playing for 70 minutes, and had an excellent game, setting Jack King up for the first goal in a 2–0 win. His first senior goal came in a second round League Cup tie against Crystal Palace. He went on to score six goals and 10 assist in his first year at professional football. In the game against Brentford opposing manager Uwe Rosler stating that Monakana was a handful with his pace and skill.

On 12 September 2013, Monakana joined fellow League One side Colchester United on a month's loan. He scored on his debut for the club in a 2–2 draw with Bradford City on 14 September. On 15 October 2013, after starting every match since joining Monakana's loan was extended at the club until the beginning of December 2013.

On 14 January 2014, Monakana transferred to Football League Championship club Brighton & Hove Albion for an undisclosed fee, signing an 18-month contract with the club's development squad. On 27 March 2014, Monakana joined League One side Crawley Town on a month's loan. In July 2014, Monakana joined Aberdeen on loan for six months. In February 2015, Monakana joined Mansfield Town on loan for a month. In March 2015, Monakana was loaned out again, joining Carlisle United this time on loan until the end of the season.

On 4 August 2015, Monakana joined League Two side Bristol Rovers on a one-month loan.

On 16 January 2016, Monakana signed a contract for six-months with Romanian club FC Voluntari.

On 22 December 2016, it was announced that Monakana had signed a one-and-a-half-year contract with National League club Sutton United. He made his first appearance for Sutton as a substitute on 1 January 2017 in a 2–0 home victory over Bromley, before making his full debut on 10 January in a 1–0 away defeat against Braintree Town.

In August 2017 he signed a loan deal with Welling United. The deal was made permanent on 17 November 2017. In March 2018, he signed for Wealdstone. He moved to Dulwich Hamlet, also of National League South, in June 2019.

On 4 September 2020, Monakana joined Icelandic Úrvalsdeild side Fjölnir until the end of the season.

In February 2021, he returned to Iceland to join 1. deild karla side Magni Grenivík.

In March 2024, following his inability to fully recover from his injury, Monakana announced his retirement from football.

== Personal life ==
Monakana is of DR Congolese descent.

== Career statistics ==
As of end of 2020 season

Appearances and goals by club, season and competition
| Club | Season | League | | | National cup | | League cup | | Other | | Total | |
| Club | Season | Division | Apps | Goals | Apps | Goals | Apps | Goals | Apps | Goals | Apps | Goals |
|---|---|---|---|---|---|---|---|---|---|---|---|---|
| Preston North End | 2012–13 | League One | 38 | 4 | 2 | 1 | 3 | 1 | 4 (Note: Appearances in the Football League Trophy) | 0 | 47 | 6 |
| Preston North End | 2013–14 | League One | 2 | 0 | 0 | 0 | 0 | 0 | 0 | 0 | 2 | 0 |
| Preston North End | Total | | 40 | 4 | 2 | 1 | 3 | 1 | 4 | 0 | 49 | 6 |
| Colchester United (loan) | 2013–14 | League One | 9 | 1 | 0 | 0 | 0 | 0 | 0 | 0 | 9 | 1 |
| Brighton & Hove Albion | 2013–14 | Championship | 0 | 0 | 0 | 0 | 0 | 0 | 0 | 0 | 0 | 0 |
| Crawley Town (loan) | 2013–14 | League One | 4 | 0 | 0 | 0 | 0 | 0 | 0 | 0 | 4 | 0 |
| Aberdeen (loan) | 2014–15 | Scottish Premiership | 10 | 0 | 0 | 0 | 0 | 0 | 0 | 0 | 10 | 0 |
| Mansfield Town (loan) | 2014–15 | League Two | 6 | 0 | 0 | 0 | 0 | 0 | 0 | 0 | 6 | 0 |
| Carlisle United (loan) | 2014–15 | League Two | 1 | 0 | 0 | 0 | 0 | 0 | 0 | 0 | 1 | 0 |
| Bristol Rovers (loan) | 2015–16 | League Two | 3 | 0 | 0 | 0 | 0 | 0 | 0 | 0 | 3 | 0 |
| Voluntari | 2015–16 | Liga I | 3 | 0 | 0 | 0 | 0 | 0 | 0 | 0 | 3 | 0 |
| Sutton United | 2016–17 | National League | 4 | 0 | 1 | 0 | — | | 2 (Note: Appearances in the FA Trophy) | 0 | 7 | 0 |
| Sutton United | 2017–18 | National League | 1 | 0 | 0 | 0 | — | | 0 | 0 | 1 | 0 |
| Sutton United | Total | | 5 | 0 | 1 | 0 | 0 | 0 | 2 | 0 | 8 | 0 |
| Margate (loan) | 2016–17 | National League South | 5 | 0 | 0 | 0 | — | | 0 | 0 | 5 | 0 |
| Welling United (loan) | 2017–18 | National League South | 14 | 1 | 0 | 0 | — | | 0 | 0 | 15 | 1 |
| Welling United | 2017–18 | National League South | 1 | 0 | 0 | 0 | — | | 0 | 0 | 1 | 0 |
| Wealdstone | 2017–18 | National League South | 8 | 1 | 0 | 0 | — | | 0 | 0 | 8 | 1 |
| Wealdstone | 2018–19 | National League South | 28 | 2 | 2 | 0 | — | | 2 (Note: Appearance(s) in National League South play-offs) | 1 | 32 | 3 |
| Wealdstone | Total | | 36 | 3 | 2 | 0 | 0 | 0 | 2 | 1 | 40 | 4 |
| Dulwich Hamlet | 2019–20 | National League South | 27 | 4 | 2 | 0 | — | | 1 | 0 | 30 | 4 |
| Fjölnir | 2020 | Úrvalsdeild | 4 | 0 | 0 | 0 | 0 | 0 | 0 | 0 | 4 | 0 |
| Career total | | | 168 | 13 | 7 | 1 | 3 | 1 | 9 | 1 | 187 | 16 |
