= Ryan Dickson =

English footballer (born 1986)

Personal information
- Full name: Ryan Anthony Dickson
- Date of birth: 14 December 1986 (age 39)
- Place of birth: Saltash, England
- Height: 1.77 m (5 ft 10 in)
- Positions: Left-back; midfielder

Youth career
- –2004: Plymouth Argyle

Senior career*
| Years | Team | Apps | (Gls) |
| 2004–2008 | Plymouth Argyle | 5 | (0) |
| 2007 | → Torquay United (loan) | 3 | (1) |
| 2007 | → Torquay United (loan) | 6 | (0) |
| 2007–2008 | → Brentford (loan) | 10 | (0) |
| 2008–2010 | Brentford | 87 | (3) |
| 2010–2013 | Southampton | 23 | (1) |
| 2012 | → Yeovil Town (loan) | 5 | (1) |
| 2012 | → Leyton Orient (loan) | 9 | (0) |
| 2013 | → Bradford City (loan) | 5 | (1) |
| 2013–2014 | Colchester United | 32 | (0) |
| 2014–2015 | Crawley Town | 32 | (1) |
| 2015–2018 | Yeovil Town | 107 | (2) |
| 2018–2020 | Torquay United | 30 | (0) |
| 2019–2020 | → Truro City (loan) | 14 | (1) |
| 2020–2022 | Truro City | 6 | (0) |
| Total | | 374 | (11) |
- * Club domestic league appearances and goals

Ryan Anthony Dickson (born 14 December 1986) is an English former professional footballer who played predominantly as a left-back.

During his 14-year career in the Football League, Dickson began his career at Plymouth Argyle, before moving to Brentford, Southampton, Colchester United, Crawley Town, Yeovil Town and Torquay United. He has appeared on loan for Torquay United on two occasions, Brentford, Yeovil Town, Leyton Orient and Bradford City. In August 2022, he became manager of Torquay United U18s before departing the role in September 2023.

== Career ==
=== Plymouth Argyle ===
Born in Saltash, Cornwall, Dickson is a product of the Plymouth Argyle youth system, turning professional in May 2004. He made his league debut on 16 October 2004, as a second-half substitute for David Worrell in a 2–1 home defeat by Wigan Athletic. His first senior start came just three days later as Plymouth won on the road against Rotherham United.

Dickson made no first-team appearances through the 2005–06 season having struggled to overcome injury problems. In August 2006, he trained with Scottish Premier League club Motherwell with a view to a loan move, but the deal eventually fell through. He had to wait until 30 December 2006 for his next first-team experience with the Pilgrims, albeit as a substitute in the 90th minute against Derby County. He played his final league game for the club in his next match against Southampton, coming on in the 80th minute in a 1–1 draw on New Year's Day 2007.

==== Torquay United (loans) ====
Dickson joined Torquay United on loan in January 2007, signing until the end of the season. Plymouth manager Ian Holloway explained that the loan spell would allow Dickson to increase his fitness before returning to Plymouth's squad for the following season. He made his Torquay debut the following day, playing in a 2–2 draw at home to Bury. He scored once in three games for the Gulls before returning to Plymouth with a hernia injury. However, on 22 March 2007, Dickson returned to Torquay on loan for a second stint until the end of the season, making five appearances.

=== Brentford ===
Dickson initially joined Brentford on loan in November 2007, making his debut in a 2–0 home defeat by Darlington on 17 November. During his 10 loan matches with the Bees, Dickson impressed Brentford manager Andy Scott enough that he was offered a long-term contract by the club in January 2008.

After making 21 further appearances as a full-time Brentford player in the 2007–08 season, Dickson played 43 times during Brentford's 2008–09 League Two title-winning season as he also scored the winning penalty in a Football League Trophy match against Yeovil Town. He registered one league goal in that campaign during a comfortable home win against Accrington Stanley on 18 April 2009.

Dickson made an effective step-up to League One level, making 32 appearances in all competitions through the season and scoring twice; the opening goal in a victory over Norwich City and the final goal in a 3–1 victory against Carlisle United.

=== Southampton ===
On 10 June 2010 it was reported that Dickson had signed a deal to join the Bees' league rivals Southampton, with the transfer fee set to be agreed at a tribunal. At the tribunal, the fee was set at £125,000 with a further £25,000 for every ten appearances Dickson made for Southampton on 10, 20, 30 and 40 games. There would also be a £25,000 fee due if Southampton won promotion within three years, together with a 20 per cent sell-on clause. He made his debut for the Saints on 7 August 2010, a 1–0 home defeat by his former club Plymouth. His only goal for the club came in the reverse fixture, a 3–1 victory for Southampton, a game which saw Southampton effectively promoted to the Championship thanks to a vastly superior goal difference to Huddersfield Town in third position. His subsequent Southampton career was heavily affected by back problems and an ankle reconstruction.

==== Yeovil Town (loan) ====
With the Saints playing Championship football in 2011–12, Dickson found himself limited to League Cup appearances in the early stages of the season. On 6 January 2012, Dickson was sent out on loan to League One side Yeovil Town for an initial month. He made his debut in a 4–0 thrashing by Sheffield United on 10 January and went on to make five appearances for the Glovers, scoring once in a 3–2 defeat by Bury on 21 January.

==== Leyton Orient (loan) ====
Following the expiry of his Yeovil spell, Dickson signed on emergency loan for Leyton Orient on 9 February 2012, joining up with the O's until the end of the season. He made his debut on 15 February as Orient beat AFC Bournemouth 2–1 at Dean Court. During his nine games with the club, Dickson was sent off twice, once for a second bookable offence in a 1–0 win against Oldham Athletic on 27 March and the second a straight red card on 14 April against Sheffield United.

==== Bradford City (loan) ====
With his club now plying their trade in the Premier League, Dickson found himself further out of favour, as he was eventually loaned out to Bradford City on 11 January until the end of the season. He made his debut for the Bantams in their 2–1 home loss to Oxford United the following day. He scored once in his six appearances for City, netting in a 2–2 draw with Fleetwood Town on 2 February.

Dickson's loan spell was cut short after being ruled out for six months as he required ankle surgery. Dickson was subsequently released from Southampton in June 2013.

=== Colchester United ===
Following an unsuccessful trial spell with his former club Plymouth Argyle, Dickson joined League One club Colchester United on trial prior to signing a one-year contract with the club in July 2013. He made his debut for the U's in the opening game of the 2013–14 season, a 1–0 win at Gillingham on 3 August.

After a sprightly start to his Colchester career, Dickson was knocked back by a debilitating illness in September 2013, leaving him out of action for two months, as he was replaced by Everton loanee Luke Garbutt. He recovered to end the season with 35 appearances to his name.

=== Crawley Town ===
Ryan Dickson was Crawley Town's third signing of the season on a two-year contract after leaving Colchester United. Dickson was awarded Crawley Town's player of the season award for the 2014–15 season.

=== Yeovil Town ===
On 1 July 2015, Dickson joined Yeovil Town on a two-year contract for a nominal fee after requesting to leave Crawley Town. He was released by Yeovil at the end of the 2017–18 season.

=== Later career ===
On 16 July 2018, Dickson signed for National League South side Torquay United. He was signed to play a central midfield role at the club. On 31 October 2019, Dickson joined Truro City on loan until January. On 26 May 2020, he joined Truro City permanently following his release from Torquay United.

== Coaching career ==
In August 2022, Dickson was appointed manager of Torquay U18s. He departed the role in September 2023 and moved into the private sector.

== Career statistics ==
Appearances and goals by club, season and competition
| Club | Season | League | | | FA Cup | | League Cup | | Other | | Total | |
| Club | Season | Division | Apps | Goals | Apps | Goals | Apps | Goals | Apps | Goals | Apps | Goals |
|---|---|---|---|---|---|---|---|---|---|---|---|---|
| Plymouth Argyle | 2004–05 | Championship | 3 | 0 | 0 | 0 | 0 | 0 | — | | 3 | 0 |
| Plymouth Argyle | 2005–06 | Championship | 0 | 0 | 0 | 0 | 0 | 0 | — | | 0 | 0 |
| Plymouth Argyle | 2006–07 | Championship | 2 | 0 | 1 | 0 | 0 | 0 | — | | 3 | 0 |
| Plymouth Argyle | 2007–08 | Championship | 0 | 0 | 0 | 0 | 1 | 0 | — | | 1 | 0 |
| Plymouth Argyle | Total | | 5 | 0 | 1 | 0 | 1 | 0 | — | | 7 | 0 |
| Torquay United (loan) | 2006–07 | League Two | 3 | 1 | 0 | 0 | 0 | 0 | 0 | 0 | 3 | 1 |
| Torquay United (loan) | 2006–07 | League Two | 6 | 0 | 0 | 0 | 0 | 0 | 0 | 0 | 6 | 0 |
| Torquay United (loan) | Total | | 9 | 1 | 0 | 0 | 0 | 0 | 0 | 0 | 9 | 1 |
| Brentford (loan) | 2007–08 | League Two | 10 | 0 | 0 | 0 | 0 | 0 | 0 | 0 | 10 | 0 |
| Brentford | 2007–08 | League Two | 21 | 0 | 0 | 0 | 0 | 0 | 0 | 0 | 21 | 0 |
| Brentford | 2008–09 | League Two | 39 | 1 | 2 | 0 | 0 | 0 | 2 (Note: Appearances in EFL Trophy) | 0 | 43 | 1 |
| Brentford | 2009–10 | League One | 27 | 2 | 4 | 0 | 1 | 0 | 0 | 0 | 32 | 2 |
| Brentford | Total | | 87 | 3 | 6 | 0 | 1 | 0 | 2 | 0 | 96 | 3 |
| Southampton | 2010–11 | League One | 23 | 1 | 3 | 0 | 1 | 0 | 1 | 0 | 28 | 1 |
| Southampton | 2011–12 | Championship | 0 | 0 | 0 | 0 | 2 | 0 | — | | 2 | 0 |
| Southampton | 2012–13 | Premier League | 0 | 0 | 0 | 0 | 0 | 0 | — | | 0 | 0 |
| Southampton | Total | | 23 | 1 | 3 | 0 | 3 | 0 | 1 | 0 | 30 | 1 |
| Yeovil Town (loan) | 2011–12 | League One | 5 | 1 | 0 | 0 | 0 | 0 | 0 | 0 | 5 | 1 |
| Leyton Orient (loan) | 2011–12 | League One | 9 | 0 | 0 | 0 | 0 | 0 | 0 | 0 | 9 | 0 |
| Bradford City (loan) | 2012–13 | League Two | 5 | 1 | 0 | 0 | 0 | 0 | 1 | 0 | 6 | 1 |
| Colchester United | 2013–14 | League One | 32 | 0 | 1 | 0 | 1 | 0 | 1 | 0 | 35 | 0 |
| Crawley Town | 2014–15 | League One | 32 | 1 | 1 | 0 | 2 | 0 | 2 | 0 | 37 | 1 |
| Yeovil Town | 2015–16 | League Two | 37 | 2 | 4 | 0 | 0 | 0 | 1 | 0 | 42 | 2 |
| Yeovil Town | 2016–17 | League Two | 34 | 0 | 1 | 0 | 1 | 0 | 4 | 0 | 40 | 0 |
| Yeovil Town | 2017–18 | League Two | 36 | 0 | 4 | 0 | 1 | 0 | 2 | 0 | 43 | 0 |
| Yeovil Town | Total | | 107 | 2 | 9 | 0 | 2 | 0 | 7 | 0 | 125 | 2 |
| Torquay United | 2018–19 | National League South | 28 | 0 | 1 | 0 | — | | 0 | 0 | 29 | 0 |
| Torquay United | 2019–20 | National League | 2 | 0 | 0 | 0 | — | | 0 | 0 | 2 | 0 |
| Torquay United | Total | | 30 | 0 | 1 | 0 | — | | 0 | 0 | 31 | 0 |
| Truro City (loan) | 2019–20 | Southern League Premier Division | 5 | 0 | — | | — | | — | | 5 | 0 |
| Career total | | | 359 | 10 | 22 | 0 | 10 | 0 | 14 | 0 | 405 | 10 |

== Honours ==
Brentford

- Football League Two: 2008–09

Torquay United

- National League South: 2018–19

Individual

- Crawley Town Player of the Year: 2014–15
