= Dexter Peter =

English footballer

Personal information
- Full name: Dexter Washington Peter
- Date of birth: 9 January 1996 (age 30)
- Place of birth: Redbridge, London, England
- Position: Centre-back

Team information
- Current team: Faversham Town

Youth career
- –2015: Millwall

Senior career*
Years	Team	Apps	(Gls)
2015	Merstham	8	(0)
2015–2016	Chelmsford City	4	(0)
2016–2017	Colchester United	0	(0)
2017	Concord Rangers	6	(0)
2017–2018	Maldon & Tiptree	23	(0)
2018	Thurrock	10	(0)
2018–2020	Coggeshall Town		
2019–2020	Grays Athletic		
2020–2021	Hullbridge Sports	8	(0)
2021–2022	Wingate & Finchley	13	(1)
2022–2023	Bowers & Pitsea	37	(2)
2023-2024	Phoenix Sports	23	(0)
2024	Saffron Walden Town	2	(0)
2024–2025	Bowers & Pitsea	21	(1)
2025	VCD Athletic	16	(0)
2025–2026	Erith Town	19	(2)
2026–	Faversham Town	0	(0)
- * Club domestic league appearances and goals as of 9 January 2026

Dexter Peter (born 9 January 1996) is an English footballer who plays as a centre-back for Isthmian League South East Division club Faversham Town.

A product of the Millwall Academy, Peter was released in February 2015, going on to play for Merstham and then Chelmsford City. He joined Colchester United's Academy in June 2016, and made his first-team debut in August 2016. He was released by Colchester in May 2017 and then joined Concord Rangers. In September 2017, he signed for Maldon & Tiptree and in February 2018 signed for Thurrock.

== Career ==
Born in Redbridge, London, Peter progressed through the academy at Millwall. He was released in February 2015 and went on to represent Isthmian League Premier Division side Merstham in the first half of the 2015–16 season, making eight league appearances. He joined National League South side Chelmsford City in December 2015, where he made four league appearances and one cup appearance during his stint with the Essex club.

Following a trial in the latter stages of the 2015–16 season, Peter signed a one-year contract with Colchester United on 29 June 2016 after impressing for the under-21s. He was named on the bench for Colchester's EFL Trophy tie against Crawley Town on 30 August 2016. He came on to make his first-team debut, replacing Sammie Szmodics after 64-minutes of the 1–0 defeat. He was released by Colchester in May 2017 after the club decided against offering him a new deal.

After his Colchester United release, Peter joined National League South side Concord Rangers. He made his debut on 5 August in their 2–1 defeat at Wealdstone.

Peter made six league appearances for Concord in August. He then left the club to sign for Isthmian League North Division side Maldon & Tiptree, making his debut on 2 September in a 3–3 draw with Hayes & Yeading United in the FA Cup.

He started playing for Isthmian League Premier Division side Thurrock in February 2018.

In August 2018, Peter joined newly promoted Isthmian League Division One North club Coggeshall Town.

In June 2022, Peter joined Bowers & Pitsea.

During the 2023–24 season, Peter played for Phoenix Sports, making 21 appearances.

In August 2024, after a short spell at Saffron Walden Town, Peters re-signed for Bowers & Pitsea. In January 2025, he joined Southern Counties East Premier Division club VCD Athletic.

He joined Faversham Town in January 2026, having played the first half of the season for Erith Town.

== Career statistics ==
As of match played 21 April 2018

Appearances and goals by club, season and competition
Club	Season	League			FA Cup		League Cup		Other		Total	
Club	Season	Division	Apps	Goals	Apps	Goals	Apps	Goals	Apps	Goals	Apps	Goals
Merstham	2015–16	Isthmian League Premier Division	8	0	0	0	–		0	0	8	0
Chelmsford City	2015–16	National League South	4	0	0	0	–		1 (Note: Appearance in Essex Senior Cup)	0	5	0
Colchester United	2016–17	League Two	0	0	0	0	0	0	1 (Note: Appearance in EFL Trophy)	0	1	0
Concord Rangers	2017–18	National League South	6	0	0	0	–		0	0	6	0
Maldon & Tiptree	2017–18	Isthmian League North Division	23	0	2	0	–		4 (Note: Appearances in Alan Turvey Trophy) (Note: Appearances in FA Trophy)	0	29	0
Thurrock	2017–18	Isthmian League Premier Division	10	0	–		–		0	0	10	0
Career total			51	0	2	0	0	0	6	0	59	0
