= Jack Curtis (footballer, born 1995) =

English footballer

Personal information
- Full name: Jack John Charles Richard Curtis
- Date of birth: 11 September 1995 (age 31)
- Place of birth: Brentwood, England
- Height: 1.79 m (5 ft 10 1/2 in)
- Position: Midfielder

Youth career
- Tottenham Hotspur
- Maldon Town
- 2011–2015: Colchester United

Senior career*
| Years | Team | Apps | (Gls) |
| 2014–2017 | Colchester United | 0 | (0) |
| 2016 | → Needham Market (loan) | 22 | (6) |
| 2017 | Harlow Town | 5 | (0) |
| 2017–2018 | Coggeshall Town | 12 | (2) |
| 2018 | → Braintree Town (dual reg.) | 3 | (0) |
| 2018– | Grays Athletic | 8 | (0) |
- * Club domestic league appearances and goals as of 19:28, 3 March 2019 (UTC)

Jack John Charles Richard Curtis (born 11 September 1995) is an English footballer who plays as a midfielder for Grays Athletic.

Curtis progressed through the youth ranks at Tottenham Hotspur and had a brief stint with Maldon Town prior to joining Colchester United's Academy in 2011. After four years with the side, he made his professional debut in the FA Cup in November 2015. He had a loan spell with Needham Market in 2016, before leaving Colchester in January 2017. He had a brief spell at Harlow Town in 2017.

== Career ==
Curtis, who was born in Brentwood, Essex and attended Shenfield High School, began his career with Tottenham Hotpsur where he was a member of the Academy. He briefly joined Maldon Town, before he joined Colchester United's Academy to continue his development ahead of the 2011–12 season. He signed his first professional contract with Colchester in November 2013.

In the same season, Curtis helped the under-18 side to the Football League Youth Alliance South East title, while he also featured in the Youth Alliance Cup final held on 29 April 2014 at Bradford City's Valley Parade stadium. He played for 85 minutes in the final against Bradford as his side won 4–2 to complete a league and cup double.

In the 2014–15 season, Curtis saw his first involvement with the first-team squad when he was named on the bench by manager Joe Dunne for Colchester's League Cup first round fixture with Charlton Athletic on 12 August 2014. However, he was an unused substitute in the 4–0 defeat. With his contract set to expire at the end of the season, Curtis signed a one-year contract extension on 8 May 2015.

Following good form at under-21 level, Colchester manager Tony Humes named Curtis amongst his substitutes for their FA Cup first round tie with Wealdstone on 7 November 2015. With his side 6–2 up, Curtis replaced Macauley Bonne for his professional debut in the fourth minute of second-half stoppage time. He was offered a new deal at the end of the season, and agreed a one-year contract extension on 26 May 2016.

Curtis joined Isthmian League Premier Division side Needham Market on loan for one month on 13 August 2016. He scored after just ten minutes of his debut as Needham were held to a 1–1 draw with Burgess Hill Town. He had his loan extended for a further month on 10 September, and his loan was further extended on 13 October. He scored six goals in 24 appearances.

On 18 January 2017, Curtis was allowed to leave Colchester after six years with the club.

In March 2017, Curtis signed for Isthmian League Premier Division side Harlow Town. He made five substitute appearances for the Hawks, but was released in June 2017 after failing to hold down a place in the starting eleven.

After a spell with Coggeshall Town, Curtis joined Braintree Town in February 2018 on a dual registration basis.

== Career statistics ==
As of match played 7 April 2018

Appearances and goals by club, season and competition
| Club | Season | League | | | FA Cup | | League Cup | | Other | | Total | |
| Club | Season | Division | Apps | Goals | Apps | Goals | Apps | Goals | Apps | Goals | Apps | Goals |
|---|---|---|---|---|---|---|---|---|---|---|---|---|
| Colchester United | 2015–16 | League One | 0 | 0 | 1 | 0 | 0 | 0 | 0 | 0 | 1 | 0 |
| Colchester United | 2016–17 | League Two | 0 | 0 | 0 | 0 | 0 | 0 | 0 | 0 | 0 | 0 |
| Colchester United | Total | | 0 | 0 | 1 | 0 | 0 | 0 | 0 | 0 | 1 | 0 |
| Needham Market (loan) | 2016–17 | Isthmian League Premier Division | 22 | 6 | 0 | 0 | – | | 5 (Note: Appearances in Alan Turvey Trophy) (Note: Appearance in Suffolk Premier Cup) (Note: Appearances in FA Trophy) | 0 | 27 | 6 |
| Harlow Town | 2016–17 | Isthmian League Premier Division | 5 | 0 | – | | – | | 0 | 0 | 5 | 0 |
| Braintree Town (dual reg.) | 2017–18 | National League South | 3 | 0 | – | | – | | – | | 3 | 0 |
| Career total | | | 30 | 6 | 1 | 0 | 0 | 0 | 5 | 0 | 36 | 6 |

== Honours ==
Colchester United U18

- 2013–14 Football League Youth Alliance South East winner
- 2013–14 Football League Youth Alliance Cup winner
