= Lloyd Doyley =

Footballer (born 1982)

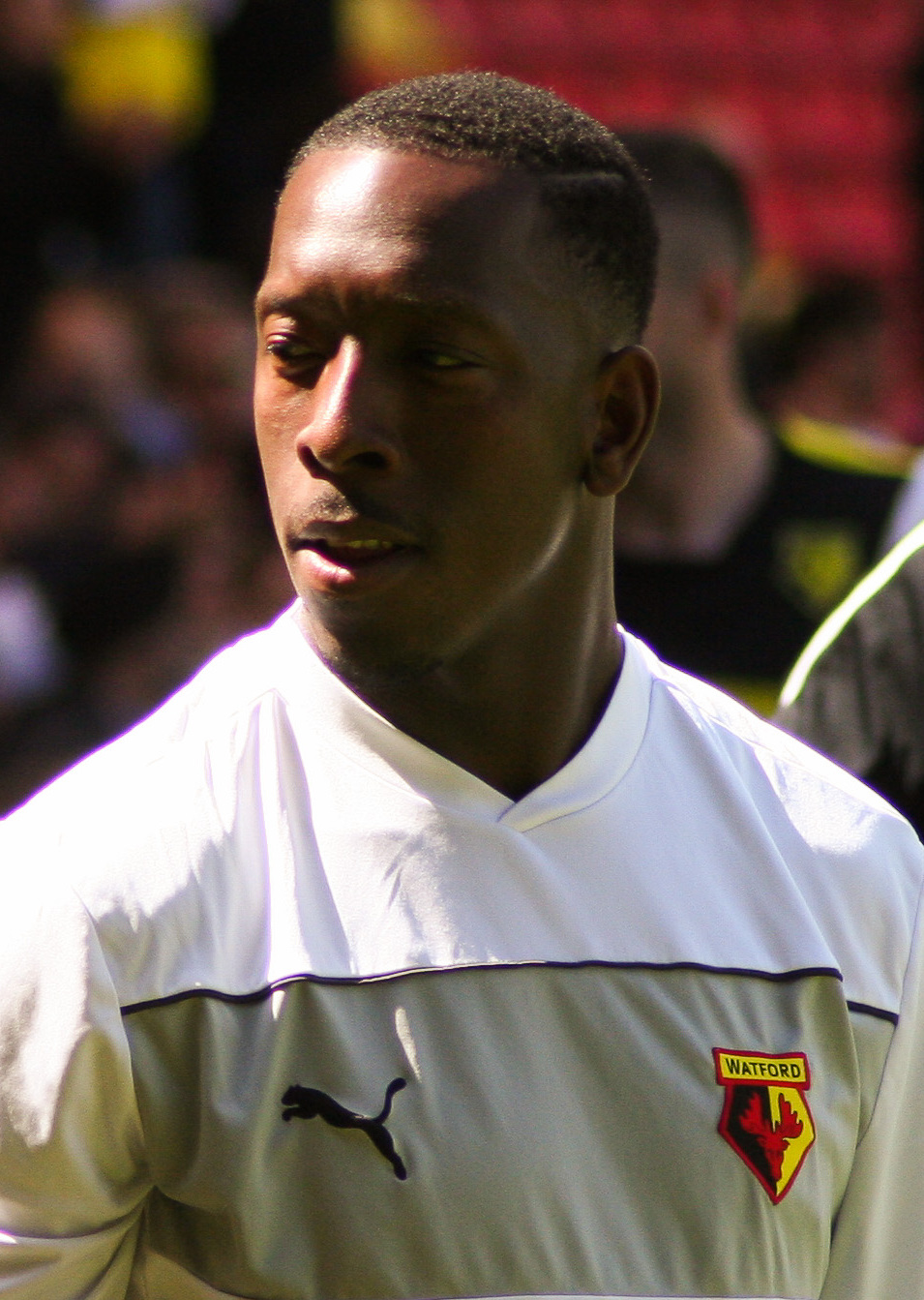
- Doyley with Watford in May 2014

Personal information
- Full name: Lloyd Colin Doyley
- Date of birth: 1 December 1982 (age 43)
- Place of birth: Whitechapel, London, England
- Height: 1.78 m (5 ft 10 in)
- Position: Defender

Team information
- Current team: Watford (under-18s assistant coach)

Youth career
- 1991–2001: Watford

Senior career*
| Years | Team | Apps | (Gls) |
| 2001–2015 | Watford | 395 | (2) |
| 2016 | Rotherham United | 3 | (0) |
| 2016–2017 | Colchester United | 3 | (0) |
| 2017–2018 | Hemel Hempstead Town | 23 | (0) |
| 2018–2019 | Billericay Town | 8 | (0) |
| 2019–2021 | Kings Langley | 23 | (1) |
| Total | | 455 | (3) |

International career
| 2013–2014 | Jamaica | 9 | (0) |
- * Club domestic league appearances and goals

Lloyd Colin Doyley (born 1 December 1982) is a former professional footballer who played as a defender. He is under-18s assistant coach at Watford.

Doyley came through the Watford Academy and went on to make 443 first-team appearances in 14 years with the club. He joined Rotherham United for a short spell in 2016, before moving to Colchester United later the same year.

Born in England, Doyley represented Jamaica at full international level, making nine appearances in 2013 and 2014.

== Club career ==
=== Watford ===
Born in Whitechapel, London, Doyley is a graduate of the Watford Academy, who joined the club at the age of 9. He made his first-team debut on 26 September 2001, replacing the injured Pierre Issa after 27-minutes of Watford's 3–3 draw at home to Birmingham City. In total, he made 21 appearances during the 2001–02 season.

Doyley sporadically appeared for the first team in the following seasons, making 24 appearances during 2002–03, twelve appearances in 2003–04, before becoming a first-team regular during the 2004–05 season, under the guidance of Aidy Boothroyd.

In the 2005–06 season, Doyley played a crucial role in helping Watford reach the 2006 play-off final. His side achieved promotion to the Premier League after defeating Leeds United 3–0 at the Millennium Stadium. He made 50 appearances in all competitions.

In summer 2006, Doyley's contract with Watford was extended to 2008. During Watford's 2006–07 Premier League campaign, Doyley made 25 appearances, including a substitute appearance against Manchester United in the 4–1 FA Cup semi-final defeat, as Watford were relegated after just one season in the top flight.

Doyley's first goal was scored on his 269th appearance for the club, on 7 December 2009 at Vicarage Road in a 3–1 win against Queens Park Rangers, over eight years after his first-team debut.

On 14 February 2012, Doyley received the first red card of his career when he fouled Jermaine Beckford in injury time during Watford's 3–2 home win against Leicester City.

Almost three years after his first goal for the club, Doyley scored his second on 15 September 2012, with a cross that evaded all the players including the goalkeeper, during Watford's 2–1 defeat away to Bolton Wanderers. In the same season, he again helped his side reach the play-off final, but Watford were defeated 1–0 by Crystal Palace. He had made his 400th Watford appearance on 2 April 2013 when he was introduced as a substitute for the injured Fitz Hall in a 1–0 win at Hull City.

After making just six league and two cup appearances during the 2014–15 season, and following Watford's promotion to the Premier League, Doyley was not offered a new contract and not given a squad number for the forthcoming season, but was allowed to continue to rehabilitate with the club following neck surgery. After recovering from injury, Doyley had been training with Charlton Athletic, Queens Park Rangers, Bristol City, and Gillingham in the hope of securing a contract.

=== Rotherham United ===
In February 2016, Doyley went on trial with Championship side Rotherham United. After a successful trial, Neil Warnock signed Doyley on a short-term deal until the end of the season. He made his debut on 20 February in Rotherham's 2–0 defeat at Burnley. He made three appearances for the club, but his contract was not renewed at the end of the season and he departed in May 2016.

=== Colchester United ===
In October 2016, Doyley signed a contract until the end of the 2016–17 season with League Two club Colchester United. He made his debut on 29 October as Colchester were defeated 2–1 by Plymouth Argyle at Home Park. He managed to play just three games for Colchester between October and the end of the season. He played what would be his final game for the club in February 2017 in a game against Barnet. He suffered a calf injury in that game which ruled him out for the remainder of the season. He was then released in May 2017 after the club decided against offering him a new deal.

=== Later career ===
Whilst out of contract, Doyley was allowed to use Watford's training facilities and was given game-time with the club's youth teams in order to maintain his match-fitness. In October 2017, Doyley joined Hemel Hempstead Town of the National League South. On 31 December 2018, he joined National League South rivals Billericay Town.

In August 2019, Doyley signed for Hertfordshire-based Southern League Premier Division side Kings Langley.

== International career ==
Doyley was first called up by the Jamaica national team in March 2013 for their 2014 World Cup qualifiers against Panama and Costa Rica. He made his international debut on 27 March 2013 in Jamaica's 2–0 defeat by Costa Rica, and went on to make nine appearances for Jamaica.

== Coaching career ==
In June 2021, Doyley was announced as the new assistant manager to Luke Garrard at National League side Boreham Wood. Doyley's former Watford teammate Connor Smith was also announced as player/coach alongside his duties as club academy manager.

Following Garrard's departure at the end of the 2023–24 season, Doyley remained at the club as first-team coach, supporting new manager Ross Jenkins whom Doyled had played alongside at Watford.

On 23 May 2024, Doyley was appointed under-18s assistant coach at former club Watford.

== Career statistics ==
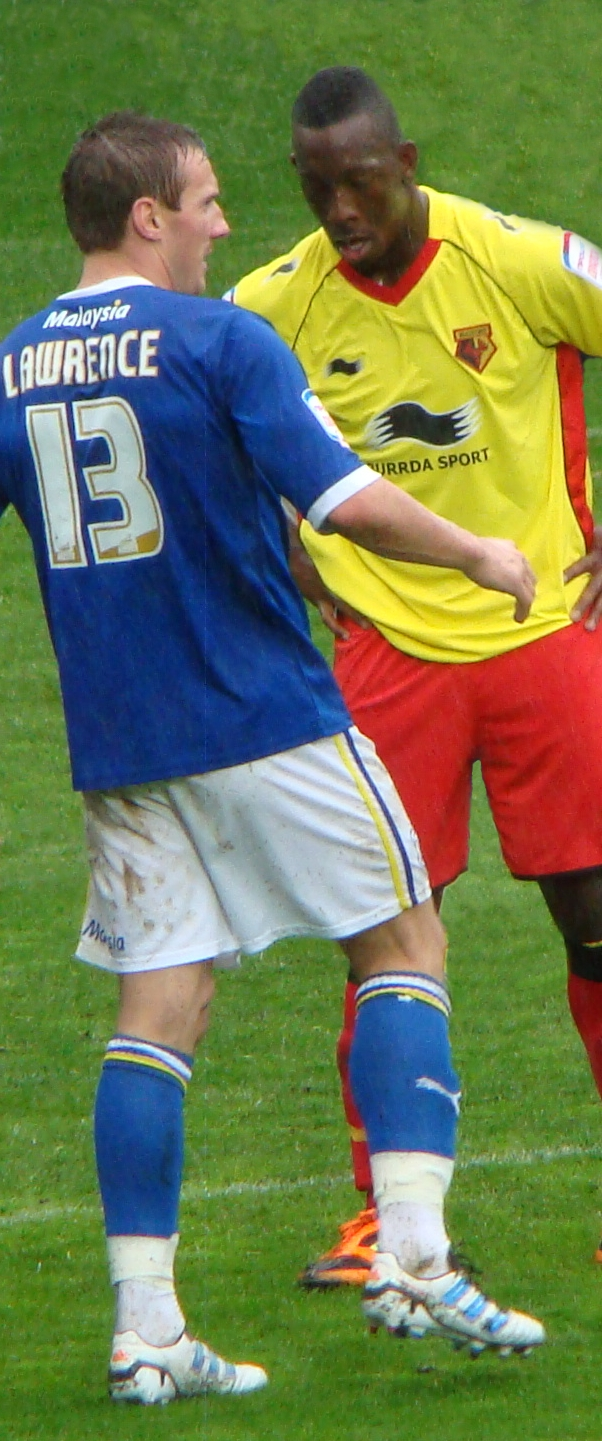
Doyley (right) playing for Watford in April 2012

As of June 2021

Appearances and goals by club, season and competition
| Club | Season | League | | | FA Cup | | League Cup | | Other | | Total | |
| Club | Season | Division | Apps | Goals | Apps | Goals | Apps | Goals | Apps | Goals | Apps | Goals |
|---|---|---|---|---|---|---|---|---|---|---|---|---|
| Watford | 2001–02 | First Division | 20 | 0 | 0 | 0 | 1 | 0 | 0 | 0 | 21 | 0 |
| Watford | 2002–03 | First Division | 22 | 0 | 1 | 0 | 1 | 0 | 0 | 0 | 22 | 0 |
| Watford | 2003–04 | First Division | 9 | 0 | 1 | 0 | 2 | 0 | 0 | 0 | 12 | 0 |
| Watford | 2004–05 | Championship | 29 | 0 | 0 | 0 | 4 | 0 | 0 | 0 | 33 | 0 |
| Watford | 2005–06 | Championship | 44 | 0 | 1 | 0 | 2 | 0 | 3 (Note: Appearances in Championship play-offs) | 0 | 50 | 0 |
| Watford | 2006–07 | Premier League | 21 | 0 | 2 | 0 | 2 | 0 | 0 | 0 | 25 | 0 |
| Watford | 2007–08 | Championship | 36 | 0 | 2 | 0 | 0 | 0 | 1 | 0 | 39 | 0 |
| Watford | 2008–09 | Championship | 37 | 0 | 2 | 0 | 4 | 0 | 0 | 0 | 43 | 0 |
| Watford | 2009–10 | Championship | 44 | 1 | 1 | 0 | 2 | 0 | 0 | 0 | 47 | 1 |
| Watford | 2010–11 | Championship | 36 | 0 | 2 | 0 | 2 | 0 | 0 | 0 | 40 | 0 |
| Watford | 2011–12 | Championship | 33 | 0 | 2 | 0 | 1 | 0 | 0 | 0 | 36 | 0 |
| Watford | 2012–13 | Championship | 34 | 1 | 1 | 0 | 1 | 0 | 3 | 0 | 39 | 1 |
| Watford | 2013–14 | Championship | 24 | 0 | 1 | 0 | 1 | 0 | 0 | 0 | 26 | 0 |
| Watford | 2014–15 | Championship | 6 | 0 | 0 | 0 | 2 | 0 | 0 | 0 | 8 | 0 |
| Watford | Total | | 395 | 2 | 16 | 0 | 25 | 0 | 7 | 0 | 443 | 2 |
| Rotherham United | 2015–16 | Championship | 3 | 0 | 0 | 0 | 0 | 0 | 0 | 0 | 3 | 0 |
| Colchester United | 2016–17 | League Two | 3 | 0 | 0 | 0 | 0 | 0 | 0 | 0 | 3 | 0 |
| Hemel Hempstead Town | 2017–18 | National League South | 13 | 0 | 0 | 0 | — | | 4 | 0 | 17 | 0 |
| Hemel Hempstead Town | 2018–19 | National League South | 10 | 0 | 0 | 0 | — | | 1 | 0 | 11 | 0 |
| Billericay Town | 2018–19 | National League South | 8 | 0 | 0 | 0 | — | | 0 | 0 | 8 | 0 |
| Kings Langley | 2019–20 | Southern Premier Division Central | 17 | 1 | 0 | 0 | — | | 5 | 1 | 22 | 2 |
| Kings Langley | 2020–21 | Southern Premier Division Central | 6 | 0 | 0 | 0 | — | | 2 | 0 | 8 | 0 |
| Career total | | | 455 | 3 | 16 | 0 | 25 | 0 | 19 | 1 | 515 | 4 |

== Honours ==
Watford

- Football League Championship play-offs: 2006
