= 2016–17 Colchester United F.C. season =

Colchester United
- Owner: Robbie Cowling
- Chairman: Robbie Cowling
- Head coach: John McGreal
- Stadium: Colchester Community Stadium
- League Two: 8th
- FA Cup: 1st round (eliminated by Chesterfield)
- EFL Cup: 1st round (eliminated by Brighton & Hove Albion)
- EFL Trophy: Group stage
- Top goalscorer: League: Chris Porter (16); All: Chris Porter (16)
- Highest home attendance: 7,003 v Leyton Orient, 12 November 2016
- Lowest home attendance: 548 v Charlton Athletic, 8 November 2016
- Average home league attendance: 3,637
- Biggest win: 4–0 v Crewe Alexandra, 26 November 2016 v Stevenage, 8 April 2017
- Biggest defeat: 0–4 v Brighton & Hove Albion, 9 August 2016 v Portsmouth, 11 March 2017
Home colours	Away colours	Third colours

The 2016–17 season was Colchester United's 80th season in their history and their first season competing in League Two following their relegation from League One in the 2015–16 season. It was their first season in the fourth tier of English football for 18-years. Along with competing in League Two, the club also participated in the FA Cup, EFL Cup and EFL Trophy.

Distinct changes in form and a series of lengthy squad injuries dictated Colchester's season. Many first-team players found themselves ruled out by injury, including Matthew Briggs, Kurtis Guthrie, Denny Johnstone, Frankie Kent, Lewis Kinsella, Doug Loft, Luke Prosser, Craig Slater, and Sammie Szmodics. Early season promise faded in late September with a winless run that stretched to the end of November. A turn in fortunes saw the U's win seven out of eight league games through December into January, earning John McGreal the December League Two Manager of the Month award. They again suffered patchy form from January onwards until a late push for the play-offs saw a return to form in April. Colchester fell just one point short of a play-off place on the final day of the League Two season, finishing in eighth position.

In the cup competitions, the U's were defeated in the first round of the EFL Cup and FA Cup by Brighton & Hove Albion and Chesterfield respectively, while they finished bottom of their group in the revamped EFL Trophy competition.

== Season overview ==
=== Preseason ===
Colchester United announced their retained list on 20 May 2016. Darren Ambrose, Joe Edwards, Tosin Olufemi, Elliot Parish, Nicky Shorey and Marvin Sordell would all be leaving after the club decided to not renew their contracts following relegation to League Two. Three Academy products, Marley Andrews, Kieran Bailey and Tyler Brampton, would also leave the club upon the expiry of their deals.

Maldon & Tiptree's Ben Wyatt became Colchester's first signing of the season on 23 May when he signed a one-year contract with the club. On 25 May, Drey Wright signed a new one-year deal with the club. The following day, Jack Curtis became the second out-of-contract player to sign a new deal.

The club confirmed their first three pre-season friendlies on 31 May. Colchester would first take on Maldon & Tiptree on 9 July, then host Ipswich Town on 20 July, before a trip to Chelmsford City on 23 July.

On 2 June, Dillon Barnes committed his future to the club by signing a three-year deal. Colchester's League Two rivals Leyton Orient signed Gavin Massey for an undisclosed fee from the club on 8 June. Colchester's next transfer dealings came on 21 June, when Sammie Szmodics signed a new three-year contract with the club. Following this came news that former Southend United defender Luke Prosser had signed a two-year deal with the club after being released by Southend. Two players also left the club the same day, with Alex Gilbey joining Championship side Wigan Athletic after an undisclosed fee was agreed for the out-of-contract player, while George Moncur joined fellow Championship club Barnsley for reported fee of £500,000.

Colchester made their third and fourth summer signings on 28 June, bringing in Scottish striker Denny Johnstone from Birmingham City for an undisclosed fee, and Courtney Senior from Brentford on a free transfer. This followed news that Academy graduate Macauley Bonne had signed a two-year contract extension on 22 June.

Having spent the second half of the previous season on trial from Chelmsford City, defender Dexter Peter joined the club on a one-year contract on 29 June. Following Peter in joining Colchester was former Gillingham wide player Brennan Dickenson. Dickenson signed a two-year contract after his release from Gillingham. The following day, four under-18 players signed one-year development contracts with the club. Committing were defender JJ Wilson, midfielder and brother of Drey Wright, Diaz Wright, winger George Brown, and forward Decarrey Sheriff.

Doug Loft joined Colchester United from Gillingham on 1 July following his release.

On 1 July, Colchester signed another ex-Gillingham player as Doug Loft joined on a two-year contract. On 4 July, Cameron James and Tariq Issa both signed new four-year deals with the club just one year after agreeing contracts until 2019. The following day, Colchester's longest serving player Tom Eastman signed a one-year contract extension.

Kurtis Guthrie became John McGreal's eighth summer signing on 6 July when he joined on a two-year contract from National League side Forest Green Rovers for an undisclosed fee. This followed news that Jamie Harney had agreed a new one-year deal with the club. On 7 July, Femi Akinwande became the final out-of-contract player to agree a new deal with the club, signing a new one-year deal. Later the same day, Colchester announced the arrival of midfielder Craig Slater from Kilmarnock for an undisclosed fee.

Colchester played their pre-season friendly fixture on 9 July away to Maldon & Tiptree. Two different sides turned out for either half, with Dexter Peter's effort separating the two teams at the interval. Former U's player Jamie Cureton turned out as a trialist for the Jammers for the second half. Colchester doubled their advantage through Macauley Bonne in the final ten minutes, before Matthew Briggs sealed the 3–0 victory late on.

In their second pre-season friendly, Szmodics scored a hat-trick against Needham Market with Chris Porter converting from the penalty spot in a 4–1 win for Colchester on 12 July. Their next fixture was a match against Welsh side Airbus UK Broughton while attending a training camp in Cheshire. Goals from Porter, Guthrie and a deflected Drey Wright shot were enough to hand the U's a 3–2 victory on 14 July.

Colchester's first home friendly was the regular pre-season fixture between the U's and neighbours Ipswich Town. Brett Pitman scored the only goal of the game to hand the visitors victory on 20 July. Another Szmodics hat-trick and Macauley Bonne's second goal of pre-season proved to be the difference between Colchester and Chelmsford City as they earned another 4–1 win on 23 July.

Premier League opposition visited the Colchester Community Stadium on 25 July with the visit of Crystal Palace. A Jordon Mutch goal separated the two sides as Colchester put in a strong performance but could not find the back of the net.

Ahead of their final pre-season friendly against Southend, the U's signed former Aston Villa defender Lewis Kinsella on a one-year contract. Colchester lost their game against Southend 2–0 on 30 July.

John McGreal appointed Luke Prosser as the new club captain on 4 August ahead of the season-opening fixture against Hartlepool United.

=== League Two ===
==== August ====
Colchester began the campaign away to Hartlepool United on 6 August. Tom Eastman scored inside five minutes to put Colchester ahead, but new signing Craig Slater brought down Nathan Thomas in the box and Billy Paynter converted the resulting penalty after 27-minutes to level the scores. The score remained the same in the second half in a game which saw a competitive debut for five Colchester players.

In the second week of the new league season, Colchester earned their first win of the campaign and John McGreal's first as manager as the U's won 2–0 at home against Cambridge United on 13 August. The goals came from Brennan Dickenson and Denny Johnstone, both goals being each player's first for the club. Dickenson's performance earned him a place in the English Football League Team of the Week for all three divisions. The same day, the club completed two transfer deals to assist the development squad. Young left-back JJ Wilson joined Maldon & Tiptree on loan for one month, while former Barnet trainee full-back Brendan Ocran signed a one-year development contract. Also leaving on loan was Jack Curtis, who joined Needham Market for one month, while George Elokobi was made available for loan.

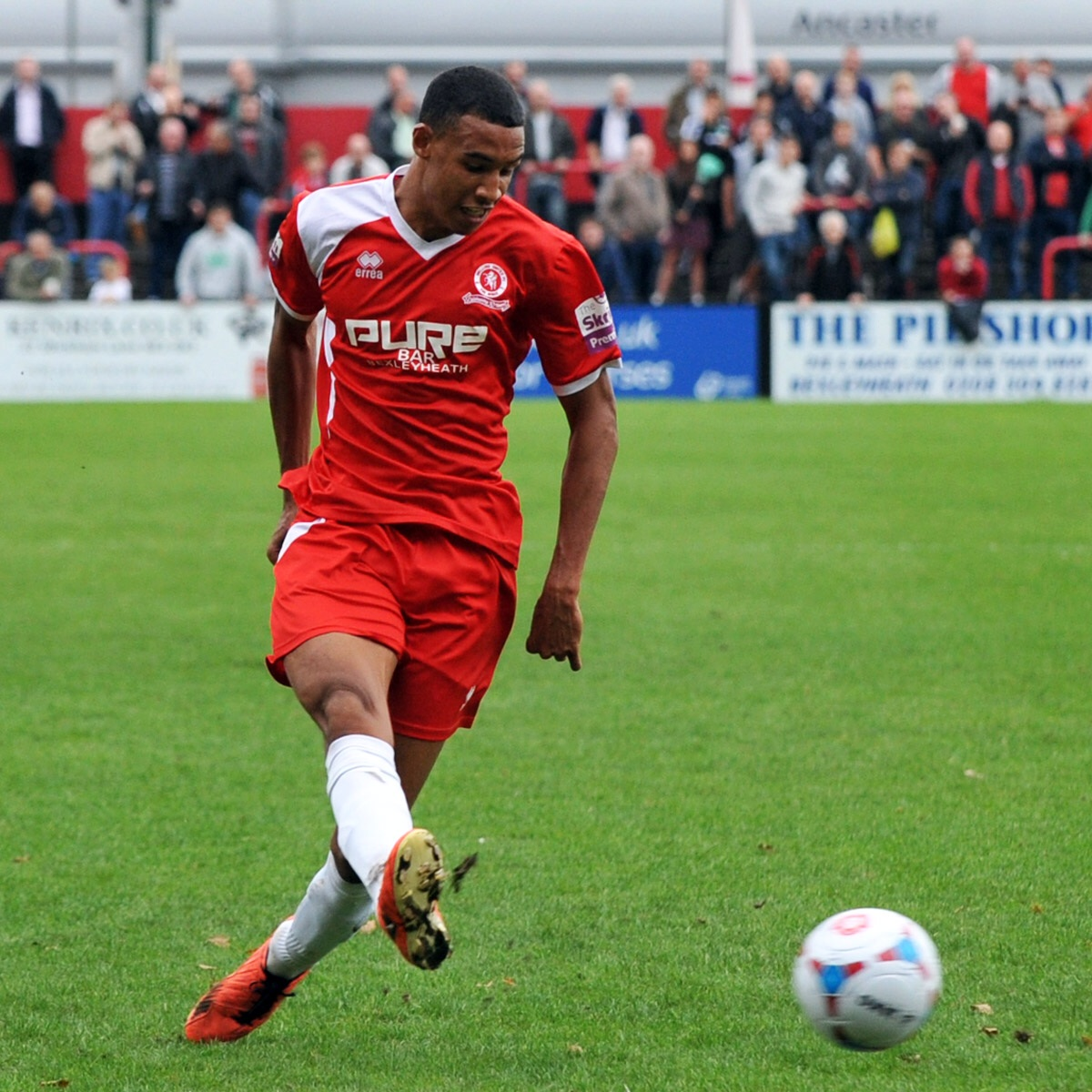
Kurtis Guthrie scored his first Colchester goal on 16 August against Grimsby Town.

In Colchester's first midweek game of the season on 16 August, the U's rushed to a 3–0 first-half lead over Grimsby Town at the Community Stadium. Brennan Dickenson scored his third goal in two games with a brace of goals in the 10th and 39th-minutes, separated by Kurtis Guthrie's first goal for the club. Grimsby fought back with an early second-half goal, and then pulled another goal back in the third minute of second-half stoppage time for a 3–2 result. Dickenson was named in the EFL Team of the Week for the second successive week as a result of his performance.

The U's were defeated 2–0 at Fratton Park on 20 August as Gary Roberts scored a brace for Portsmouth. A goal and assist from Chris Porter gave Colchester a 2–0 away victory at Wycombe Wanderers on 27 August with Sammie Szmodics also registering his first goal of the season.

Colchester bolstered their under-23 ranks with the signing of Welsh youth international Rhys Williams on 29 August. The club made two transfer deadline day loan signings of winger Tarique Fosu from Reading until 7 January 2017, and midfielder Glen Kamara for the same period.

It was announced on 6 September that John McGreal and Brennan Dickenson were in contention to win the League Two 'Manager of the Month' and 'Player of the Month' awards respectively.

==== September ====
After the English Football League transfer window had closed, National League side Lincoln City signed Macauley Bonne on loan initially until 26 October on 2 September.

Colchester's unbeaten home record for the season was ended by visitors Exeter City on 3 September. Robbie Simpson opened the scoring for Exeter after eight minutes, but Sammie Szmodics equalised with his second goal in as many league games after 13-minutes. The U's went ahead seven minutes from half-time when Kurtis Guthrie also scored his second goal of the season. However, Colchester conceded two second-half goals without reply to consign them to a 3–2 defeat.

After failing to break into Colchester's first-team squad, defender Jamie Harney's contract was terminated by mutual consent on 9 September.

Colchester bounced back from their 3–2 defeat against Exeter with a 3–2 win against Blackpool at home on 10 September. The visitors took the lead, but Sammie Szmodics registered his third goal in three league games to equalise nine minutes prior to the break. The U's took the lead after 56-minutes from Chris Porter's close range shot. Porter scored again to put Colchester further in front with six minutes to go, before Blackpool pulled one back through Brad Potts in the 89th minute. Porter's performance earned him a place in the EFL 'Team of the Week'.

Colchester travelled to Barnet on 17 September for their first ever game at The Hive. Loanee Tarique Fosu scored his first goal for the club after six minutes, and lead for 76 minutes by this margin until Curtis Weston scored an equaliser for Barnet.

Accrington Stanley left the Weston Homes Community Stadium with three points on their first visit on 24 September after beating Colchester 2–1. Drey Wright had scored his first goal of the season after seven-minutes, but two second-half goals from Romauld Boco and Billy Kee condemned the U's to their third defeat of the season.

Closing September with their second trip of the season to Broadfield Stadium, Colchester came away with a point, an improvement on their performance in the EFL Trophy. The hosts had taken the lead after 18-minutes, but Chris Porter scored his fourth goal of the season to rescue a point in the 88th minute of the game.

==== October ====
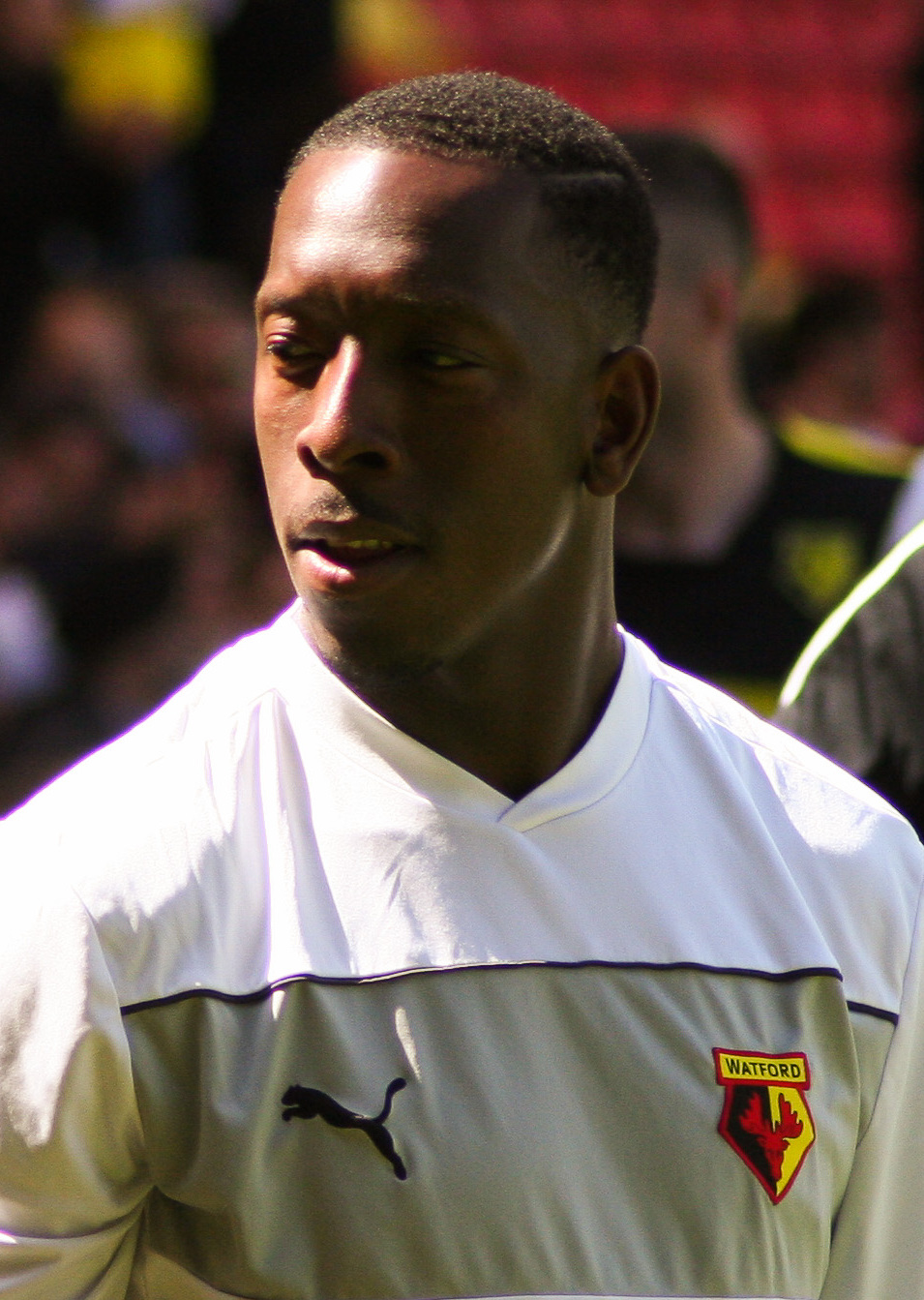
McGreal brought in former Watford and Rotherham United defender Lloyd Doyley on a free transfer on 7 October.

Colchester stretched their winless run to four games on 1 October with a 2–0 defeat in their away trip to Carlisle United. George Elokobi was loaned out to Braintree Town on 4 October for one month. Colchester signed free agent Lloyd Doyley on 7 October after having been signed to Championship side Rotherham United during the 2015–16 campaign.

Colchester hosted Newport County for the first time since the 1987–88 season on 8 October, with the Welsh club rooted to the bottom of the League Two table. The U's winless run stretched to six games without a win after a goalless draw. On 13 October, Jack Curtis' loan at Needham Market was extended until 12 November, while Colchester recalled Macauley Bonne from his loan spell at Lincoln.

Second-placed Doncaster Rovers hosted the U's on 15 October, and while Colchester had the better of the chances, Doncaster edged a 1–0 victory with a first-half injury time goal from Tommy Rowe separating the sides. A week later, Colchester had a great start against Morecambe when Chris Porter scored after four minutes of their first ever league encounter, and only the second meeting between the two sides. Goalkeeper Sam Walker saved a Morecambe penalty in the first-half, before Tom Barkhuizen equalised on 27-minutes. Porter scored his sixth goal of the season after converting a penalty six minutes before the interval. Morecambe earned a 2–2 draw when substitute Lee Molyneux scored in the 77th minute. Meanwhile, under-23 striker Femi Akinwande joined National League South side Bishop's Stortford for one month. Callum Harrison also left the club temporarily on 25 October, joining Needham Market for a second loan spell with the Isthmian League Premier Division side. Also leaving the club on loan was Ben Wyatt, who joined National League South outfit Concord Rangers for one month on 28 October.

Referee Kevin Johnson was forced to leave the field on a stretcher during Colchester's tie with Plymouth Argyle following a collision with Jimmy Spencer on 29 October. Craig Tanner had opened the scoring for the home side on 16 minutes, but a Craig Slater free kick levelled the score after 31-minutes. Following a ten-minute delay for Kevin Johnson's injury, Ryan Donaldson capitalised on a defensive mix-up to put his side 2–1 up. Plymouth held on for 16-minutes of injury time to condemn Colchester to a ninth consecutive game without victory.

==== November ====
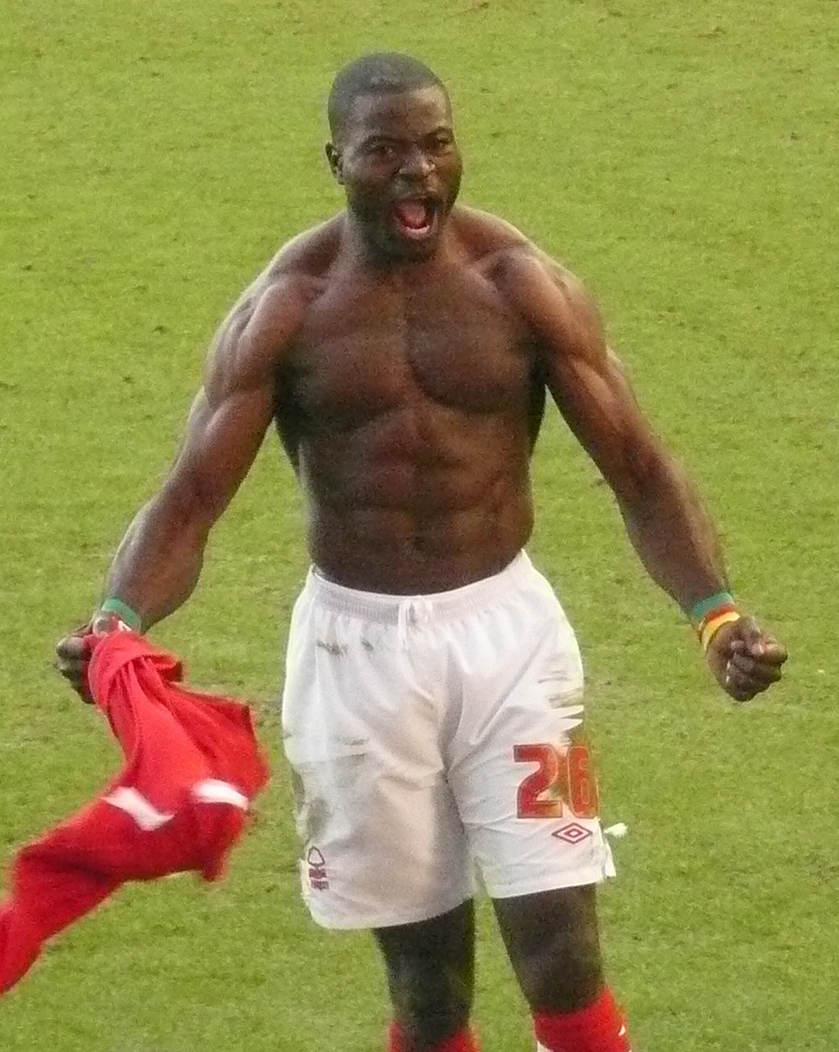
Colchester embarked on a winning run after recalling and reinstating George Elokobi from his loan at Braintree Town.

Colchester attracted their largest crowd of the season on 12 November for their home game against Leyton Orient. The O's, who were in the relegation zone before kickoff, beat the U's 3–0 to drop Colchester to 22nd-position, just one point outside of the relegation places. Colchester slipped into the relegation zone on 19 November after they conceded two goals in the final four minutes of their game against Yeovil Town. Kurtis Guthrie's goal early in the second half was cancelled out by substitute François Zoko before fellow substitute Tahvon Campbell scored Yeovil's winner in the 90th minute.

The U's recalled George Elokobi from his loan at Braintree Town and he was handed his first start of the season for Colchester's game against Cheltenham Town on 22 November. Owen Garvan made his first appearance of the season, assisting a goal as Colchester earned their first victory in eleven League Two matches, moving them out of the bottom two. Craig Slater scored first in the 48th minute following a goalless first half, before Brennan Dickenson scored his fourth of the season on 65-minutes. Three minutes later, a Tom Eastman header from a Garvan corner kick gave the U's a three-goal advantage. The match ended 3–0 to Colchester, while Cheltenham had Harry Pell sent off for simulation in the 87th minute. They followed this up with their biggest win of the season, a 4–0 home win over Crewe Alexandra on 26 November. Kurtis Guthrie opened the scoring in the first-half, while Owen Garvan, Drey Wright and Brennan Dickenson scored in the second half to move the U's up to 15th.

==== December ====
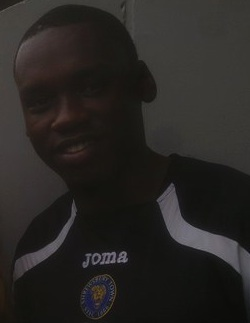
Jermaine Grandison signed until the end of the season on 22 December after impressing for the under-23 side.

Colchester opened December with a goalless draw at Mansfield Town on 10 December. They extended their unbeaten run to four games on 17 December with a 2–1 home win over Notts County. The visitors took the lead in the first half, but Kurtis Guthrie scored his fifth goal of the season to level the scores before the interval. A goalmouth scramble saw Richard Duffy score an own goal with 13-minutes remaining to hand the win to the U's.

Goalkeeper James Bransgrove announced his retirement from professional football on 21 December at the age of 21 to pursue a career in business. On 22 December, Colchester signed Jermaine Grandison on a contract until the end of the season after he impressed in games for the under-23 squad. The same day, Dion Sembie-Ferris joined Ben Wyatt at National League South side Concord Rangers on loan for one month.

The U's extended their run with an away win at Luton Town in their Boxing Day fixture. Craig Slater's third goal of the campaign proved the difference between the sides as Colchester returned to the top-half of the table. They then closed 2016 with another away win at Stevenage on 31 December. The U's took the lead after 15-minutes when Brennan Dickenson headed in a corner from Owen Garvan before Kurtis Guthrie added a second from the penalty spot after being fouled by former Colchester loanee Jamie Jones. Stevenage fought back with a goal late in the first half, and then equalised six minutes into the second half. Substitute Chris Porter scored his first goal since October following injury to reclaim the lead for his side, and then fellow substitute Tarique Fosu scored in injury time for a 4–2 victory.

==== January ====
Colchester started 2017 with a 2–0 win against Cheltenham Town at the Community Stadium. Tom Eastman scored his third goal of the season after 10-minutes, before Brennan Dickenson scored in the 84th minute for his seventh of the campaign to move the U's up to eighth in the League Two table. Dickenson was then named in the EFL 'Team of New Year' for the games played either side of New Year, while John McGreal was shortlisted for the 'Manager of the Month' award for December after securing ten points from a possible twelve for his side. McGreal became the first Colchester manager since Paul Lambert in January 2009 to be named 'Manager of the Month' on 6 January.

Colchester moved back into the play-off positions on 7 January after beating third-placed Carlisle United 4–1 to earn their fifth successive victory. Chris Porter scored in the eleventh minute to put the U's 1–0 ahead, but Brisley equalised with a looping header on 28-minutes. The U's retook the lead on 33-minutes when Kurtis Guthrie scored with a curling effort. He scored his second five minutes after half-time to put his side 3–1 ahead, and he completed his hat-trick in the fifth minute of injury time, moving the U's up to sixth in the table. He was subsequently named in the EFL 'Team of the Week'.

On 12 January, Tarique Fosu had his loan extended by the club until the end of the season, while fellow loanee Glen Kamara returned to Arsenal.

Colchester traveled to Newport County on 14 January, where their hosts held the U's to a 1–1 draw. Josh Sheehan opened the scoring for Newport, before Chris Porter converted a penalty kick in the 35th minute after Kurtis Guthrie had been fouled in the area.

On 18 January, the club announced that it was to part company with midfielder Jack Curtis. The same day, the club announced the signing of Eli Phipps from Cardiff City for an undisclosed fee on an 18-month contract. Further transfer activity followed on 20 January, with triallist Tommy O'Sullivan joining Eli Phipps in moving from Cardiff City for an undisclosed fee. He signed a contract until June 2018. Meanwhile, left-back Michael O'Donoghue left the club by mutual consent after making just one first-team appearance.

Colchester suffered their first defeat since 19 November when they lost 3–0 at in-form Exeter City on 21 January.

On 27 January, Macauley Bonne was sent out on loan for a second time to the National League, joining Woking for an initial month. On 30 January, Chris Regis became the third Academy player to leave the club in order to seek first-team football, while Rekeil Pyke joined the U's from Huddersfield Town on loan until the end of the season. Colchester completed two deadline day transfer deals on 31 January. The arrival of goalkeeper Dean Brill following his release from Motherwell would provide competition for Sam Walker and would allow Dillon Barnes to head out on loan, in response to the surprise retirement of James Bransgrove in December. Then, after having his contract terminated by Swindon Town earlier in the day, midfielder Sean Murray joined the U's on a one-and-a-half-year deal.

==== February ====
On 3 February, Femi Akinwande made a loan return to his former club Maldon & Tiptree, joining the Jammers for an initial one-month loan.

A trip to Blackpool on 4 February saw the U's return with a point after a battling draw. Jamille Matt had opened the scoring for the home side after 12-minutes, but Kurtis Guthrie's tenth goal of the season gave Colchester a share of the points six minutes later. Debutant Sean Murray was sent off for a bad tackle on Jim McAlister in the fifth minute of injury time. Matthew Briggs made his first competitive appearance of the season following a long injury layoff. Colchester's next game at home to Barnet on 11 February saw two central defenders forced off with injury within the first 15-minutes. Frankie Kent was replaced by Alex Wynter and Lloyd Doyley by Matthew Briggs. Despite the defensive setback, the U's took the lead following Kurtis Guthrie's long range shot on 18-minutes. Their advantage was doubled prior to half-time by Brennan Dickenson. Barnet scored a late goal but Colchester held on for a 2–1 victory.

The U's suffered their first home defeat since November on 14 February after Crawley Town won 3–2 at the Community Stadium. Denny Johnstone scored his second goal for the club to give the hosts an 18th-minute lead, but a hat-trick from Jimmy Smith put Colchester 3–1 down by the 51st-minute. A late consolation goal from Brennan Dickenson reduced the deficit, while both Charley Edge and Rekeil Pyke made their professional debuts from the bench as the club slipped to 10th in the league table. Colchester then suffered their first back-to-back defeats since November when they lost 2–1 at Accrington Stanley on 18 February. First-half goals from Billy Kee and Matty Pearson handed Accrington the advantage before Omar Beckles was shown a red card for a tackle on Brennan Dickenson just before the break. Chris Porter scored his tenth goal of the season from the penalty spot but it proved only to be a consolation.

Colchester earned a 1–0 win against Wycombe Wanderers on 21 February to leapfrog them into 7th-position and the play-off places. George Elokobi scored with a long range effort on 13-minutes, and the U's held on for the remainder of the game, while the visitors had defender Joe Jacobson sent off for a second bookable offence two minutes from full-time.

Both Frankie Kent and Denny Johnstone were ruled out for the remainder of the season during February following injuries sustained during the games against Barnet and Accrington Stanley respectively.

The U's remained in the play-off places on 25 February following a 2–1 win at home to Hartlepool United. Second-half goals from Kurtis Guthrie and Chris Porter secured the win for Colchester, despite Hartlepool pulling a goal back eight minutes from full-time. They were then defeated 1–0 at Grimsby Town on 28 February which pushed them back out of the play-off positions and into ninth.

==== March ====
March began with more injury problems for Colchester, with Craig Slater and Kurtis Guthrie requiring operations which would rule them out for the remainder of the season. Meanwhile, Femi Akinwande joined his third loan club of the season, signing with National League South East Thurrock United for one month on 3 March.

Sammie Szmodics scored on his return from injury to earn Colchester a point away at Cambridge United on 4 March. After going behind in the 20th minute, substitute Szmodics scored with six minutes remaining to salvage a point for the injury-stricken U's, while both sides also had goals disallowed.

On 10 March, it was announced that Director of Football Tony Humes and Director of Football Operations Tony Ashby had been added to board of directors at the club.

Colchester failed to register a shot on target in their home game against Portsmouth on 11 March when they were beaten 4–0, remaining three points off the play-off positions. They followed this up with a 2–0 home win against Mansfield Town on 14 March, Brennan Dickenson and Sammie Szmodics the goalscorers for the U's in the first-half.

After scoring in the midweek game, Sammie Szmodics broke his leg in Colchester's 2–0 defeat at Crewe Alexandra on 18 March. For their following game, Tom Eastman returned to the starting line-up for Colchester's game against Luton Town at the Community Stadium on 25 March. Two Chris Porter goals in the first-half were enough to decide the match, while Luton scored a consolation through Isaac Vassell in the third minute of stoppage time. Porter was named in the EFL Team of the Week for his performance against Luton.

Having failed to break into the Colchester United first-team, Jermaine Grandison was released on 29 March without making an appearance for the club.

==== April ====
Colchester travelled to Notts County for their first game of the month on 1 April. The home side opened the scoring after eight minutes, but Chris Porter's third goal in two games evened the game on 21-minutes. Shola Ameobi scored either side of the half-time break to record a 3–1 victory for County, leaving the U's five points off the playoff positions. They followed this up by equalling their best result of the season with a 4–0 win at home to Stevenage. Brennan Dickenson's eleventh goal of the campaign arrived on 12-minutes, and Chris Porter scored his 15th goal of the season after 30-minutes. Two own goals by Josh McQuoid on 34-minutes and Charlie Lee on 39-minutes sealed Colchester's win before the half-time break. The score remained the same in the second half, while Tommy O'Sullivan came on to make his club debut twelve minutes from time. Winger Tarique Fosu was named Man of the Match and earned a place in the EFL 'Team of the Week' for his performance after playing a part in two of Colchester's goals.

Midfielder Owen Garvan had his contract cancelled by mutual consent on 11 April citing personal reasons for his departure.

On Good Friday, Colchester held league leaders and already promoted Doncaster Rovers to a 1–1 draw at the Community Stadium. Brennan Dickenson opened the scoring after 16-minutes, before the visitors equalised in first-half injury time.

Colchester were held to a 1–1 draw at Morecambe on Easter Monday having held a 1–0 lead following Richard Brindley's free kick in the 22nd minute until the 88th, when former Colchester defender Michael Rose equalised from the penalty spot. This left the U's two points from the play-off places with three games remaining. A third consecutive draw followed on 22 April when they played out a goalless draw with second-placed Plymouth Argyle at the Community Stadium, leaving Colchester three points outside the play-off places with two games remaining.

With Colchester looking to make the play-off places, they travelled to already relegated Leyton Orient on 29 April. The U's took the lead through Tarique Fosu on 26-minutes, but shortly after the half-time break, former Colchester youth team player Sandro Semedo equalised. Chris Porter and Macauley Bonne both scored for Colchester to make it 3–1 before the 85th-minute, when Orient supporters stormed the pitch to protest the running of the club. With supporters refusing to move from the pitch, the match was abandoned an hour after the initial delay in play. Two hours following the postponement, the players returned to the pitch in front of an empty stadium to play out the final five minutes plus three for stoppage time which sealed the 3–1 result for Colchester.

==== May ====
Ahead of Colchester's final game of the season, it was revealed that Brennan Dickenson had sustained cruciate ligament damage during training that would leave him sidelined for up to nine months. Tarique Fosu's brace of goals in Colchester's 2–0 win against Yeovil on 6 May were not enough to lift the U's into the play-off places after results elsewhere went against them, meaning they finished the campaign in eighth position just one point outside the play-offs.

=== EFL Cup ===
McGreal named seven changes to his squad that drew 1–1 with Hartlepool on the opening day of the season for their EFL Cup tie with Championship side Brighton & Hove Albion, including debuts for young goalkeeper Dillon Barnes, Brennan Dickenson, and Doug Loft. Colchester were dominated by Brighton but managed to go into the half-time break at 0–0. Three goals in ten second-half minutes effectively ended the U's chances, before a fourth was added four-minutes from time.

=== EFL Trophy ===
In the new-look EFL Trophy group stage, Colchester lost their first game 1–0 to Crawley Town on 30 August, but handed first-team debuts for Dexter Peter and Diaz Wright. Colchester also lost their second game at home to Southampton U23 on 4 October. Sam McQueen opened the scoring for the visitors after eight minutes, before Dion Sembie-Ferris scored his first goal for the club on 23-minutes. Tariq Issa replaced Sembie-Ferris at half-time to make his debut for the club, before Olufela Olomola scored the winner six minutes later. Unable to progress to the knock-out phase of the competition, Colchester hosted Charlton Athletic in their third and final match on 8 November in front of a crowd of just 548. Charlton took the lead through Nicky Ajose, but Macauley Bonne scored his first goal of the season three minutes from half-time to level the score. Unable to find a winner, the game ended in a draw, with the final bonus point decided by penalties. Dillon Barnes made two saves to earn his side a 4–3 penalty shoot-out win.

=== FA Cup ===
Drawn against League One Chesterfield, Colchester drew a crowd of just 1,840 for their FA Cup first round fixture. Chesterfield took the lead in the first half, but half-time substitute Tarqiue Fosu equalised immediately following the break. Chesterfield striker Ched Evans restored the visitors lead four minutes later, and Chesterfield held on to win 2–1.

== Players ==
=== First-team squad ===
As of 6 May 2017.

Note: Flags indicate national team as defined under FIFA eligibility rules; some limited exceptions apply. Players may hold more than one non-FIFA nationality.

No.	Pos.	Nation	Player
1	GK	ENG	Sam Walker
2	DF	ENG	Richard Brindley
3	DF	GUY	Matthew Briggs
4	MF	ENG	Tom Lapslie
5	DF	ENG	Luke Prosser (captain)
6	DF	ENG	Frankie Kent
7	FW	ENG	Drey Wright
8	MF	ENG	Doug Loft
9	FW	ENG	Chris Porter
10	MF	ENG	Sammie Szmodics
11	FW	ENG	Brennan Dickenson
12	DF	ENG	Kane Vincent-Young
14	DF	ENG	Alex Wynter
15	DF	CMR	George Elokobi

No.	Pos.	Nation	Player
17	FW	SCO	Denny Johnstone
18	DF	ENG	Tom Eastman
19	FW	ZIM	Macauley Bonne
21	FW	ENG	Dion Sembie-Ferris
23	MF	IRL	Sean Murray
24	MF	SCO	Craig Slater
25	GK	ENG	Dillon Barnes
28	FW	ENG	Kurtis Guthrie
29	GK	ENG	Dean Brill
30	DF	JAM	Lloyd Doyley
32	MF	WAL	Tommy O'Sullivan
33	DF	ENG	Lewis Kinsella
35	DF	ENG	Cameron James
41	MF	IRL	Louis Dunne

=== Under-23s ===
As of 6 May 2017

Note: Flags indicate national team as defined under FIFA eligibility rules; some limited exceptions apply. Players may hold more than one non-FIFA nationality.

No.	Pos.	Nation	Player
16	FW	ENG	Femi Akinwande
20	FW	ENG	Courtney Senior
26	FW	WAL	Eli Phipps
36	DF	ENG	Ben Wyatt
37	MF	ENG	Callum Harrison
39	FW	WAL	Charley Edge

No.	Pos.	Nation	Player
40	DF	ENG	Dexter Peter
42	FW	ENG	Decarrey Sheriff
43	FW	ENG	George Brown
44	MF	ENG	Diaz Wright
45	DF	ENG	JJ Wilson
46	FW	ENG	Tariq Issa

== Match details ==
=== Preseason friendlies ===
8 July 2016 Friendly	Maldon & Tiptree	0–3	Colchester United	Maldon
15:00 BST		Report; Goal 1 Goal 2 Goal 3	Peter 29'; Bonne 81'; Briggs 89'	Stadium: Wallace Binder Ground; Attendance: 435

12 July 2016 Friendly	Needham Market	1–4	Colchester United	Needham Market
19:45 BST	Osei 83'	Report; Goal 1 Goal 2 Goal 3 Goal 4 Goal 5 Attendance	Szmodics 49', 63', 75'; Porter 64' (pen.)	Stadium: Bloomfields; Attendance: 251; Referee: Alan Dale

14 July 2016 Friendly	(Wales) Airbus UK Broughton	2–3	Colchester United	Broughton
19:30 BST	Monteiro 11'; Trialist 85'	Report; Goal 1 Goal 2 Goal 3 Goal 4 Goal 5	Porter 18'; Guthrie 69'; Drey Wright 83'	Stadium: The Airfield

20 July 2016 Friendly	Colchester United	0–1	Ipswich Town	Colchester
19:45 BST		Report; Report	Pitman 39'	Stadium: Colchester Community Stadium; Attendance: 2,750; Referee: Gavin Ward

23 July 2016 Friendly	Chelmsford City	1–4	Colchester United	Chelmsford
15:00 BST	Daley 54'	Report; Report; Referee	Bonne 19'; Szmodics 68', 81', 87'	Stadium: Melbourne Stadium; Referee: Tom Ramsey

25 July 2016 Friendly	Colchester United	0–1	Crystal Palace	Colchester
19:00 BST		Report; Goal	Mutch 9'	Stadium: Colchester Community Stadium

30 July 2016 Friendly	Southend United	2–0	Colchester United	Southend-on-Sea
15:00 BST	Cox 17' (pen.); Mooney 24'	Report; Goal 1 Goal 2		Stadium: Roots Hall; Attendance: 1,971

=== League Two ===
==== Results round by round ====
Round	1	2	3	4	5	6	7	8	9	10	11	12	13	14	15	16	17	18	19	20	21	22	23	24	25	26	27	28	29	30	31	32	33	34	35	36	37	38	39	40	41	42	43	44	45	46
Ground	A	H	H	A	A	H	H	A	H	A	A	H	A	H	A	H	A	A	H	A	H	A	A	H	H	A	A	A	H	H	A	H	H	A	A	H	H	A	H	A	H	H	A	H	A	H
Result	D	W	W	L	W	L	W	D	L	D	L	D	L	D	L	L	L	W	W	D	W	W	W	W	W	D	L	D	W	L	L	W	W	L	D	L	W	L	W	L	W	D	D	D	W	W
Position	13	3	2	5	4	8	5	6	8	10	11	12	13	15	18	22	23	17	15	16	13	10	9	8	6	7	7	9	9	10	11	7	7	9	9	10	9	11	10	12	10	9	10	12	10	8

Updated to match(es) played on 6 May 2017. Source: cu-fc.com
A = Away; H = Home; W = Win; D = Draw; L = Loss

==== League table ====
Pos	Team	Pld	W	D	L	GF	GA	GD	Pts	Promotion, qualification or relegation
6	Carlisle United	46	18	17	11	69	68	+1	71	Qualification for League Two play-offs (Note: Four teams play for one spot and promotion to EFL League One)
7	Blackpool (O, P)	46	18	16	12	69	46	+23	70	Qualification for League Two play-offs
8	Colchester United	46	19	12	15	67	57	+10	69	
9	Wycombe Wanderers	46	19	12	15	58	53	+5	69	
10	Stevenage	46	20	7	19	67	63	+4	67	

Updated to match(es) played on 6 May 2017. Source: BBC Sport
Rules for classification: 1) Points; 2) Goal difference; 3) Number of goals scored
(O) Play-off winners; (P) Promoted

==== Matches ====
6 August 2016 1	Hartlepool United	1–1	Colchester United	Hartlepool
15:00 BST	Paynter 27' (pen.)	Report	Eastman 4'	Stadium: Victoria Park; Attendance: 4,055; Referee: Paul Tierney

13 August 2016 2	Colchester United	2–0	Cambridge United	Colchester
15:00 BST	Dickenson 8'; Johnstone 82'	Report		Stadium: Colchester Community Stadium; Attendance: 4,521; Referee: Ollie Yates

16 August 2016 3	Colchester United	3–2	Grimsby Town	Colchester
15:00 BST	Dickenson 10', 39'; Guthrie 34'	Report	Disley 48'; Bogle 90+3'	Stadium: Colchester Community Stadium; Attendance: 3,287; Referee: Kevin Johnson

20 August 2016 4	Portsmouth	2–0	Colchester United	Portsmouth
15:00 BST	Roberts 79', 84' (pen.)	Report		Stadium: Fratton Park; Attendance: 15,967; Referee: Charles Breakspear

27 August 2016 5	Wycombe Wanderers	0–2	Colchester United	High Wycombe
15:00 BST		Report	Porter 63'; Szmodics 82'	Stadium: Adams Park; Attendance: 3,439; Referee: John Brooks

3 September 2016 6	Colchester United	2–3	Exeter City	Colchester
15:00 BST	Szmodics 13'; Guthrie 38'	Report	Simpson 8'; Watkins 51'; Grant 67'	Stadium: Colchester Community Stadium; Attendance: 3,364; Referee: Darren Deadman

10 September 2016 7	Colchester United	3–2	Blackpool	Colchester
15:00 BST	Szmodics 36'; Porter 56', 84'	Report	Gnanduillet 13'; Potts 89'	Stadium: Colchester Community Stadium; Attendance: 3,077; Referee: Brendan Malone

17 September 2016 8	Barnet	1–1	Colchester United	Canons Park
15:00 BST	Weston 82'	Report	Fosu 6'	Stadium: The Hive Stadium; Attendance: 2,158; Referee: Brett Huxtable

24 September 2016 9	Colchester United	1–2	Accrington Stanley	Colchester
15:00 BST	Drey Wright 7'	Report	Boco 59'; Kee 68'; Brown (yellow card) (yellow-red card) 75'	Stadium: Colchester Community Stadium; Attendance: 3,109; Referee: Graham Horwood

27 September 2016 10	Crawley Town	1–1	Colchester United	Crawley
19:45 BST	Yussuf 18'	Report	Porter 88'	Stadium: Broadfield Stadium; Attendance: 1,851; Referee: Andy Haines

1 October 2016 11	Carlisle United	2–0	Colchester United	Carlisle
15:00 BST	Kennedy 51'; Ibehre 79'	Report		Stadium: Brunton Park; Attendance: 4,516; Referee: Graham Salisbury

8 October 2016 12	Colchester United	0–0	Newport County	Colchester
15:00 BST		Report		Stadium: Colchester Community Stadium; Attendance: 3,088; Referee: Mark Haywood

15 October 2016 13	Doncaster Rovers	1–0	Colchester United	Doncaster
15:00 BST	Rowe 45+1'	Report		Stadium: Keepmoat Stadium; Attendance: 5,007; Referee: Seb Stockbridge

22 October 2016 14	Colchester United	2–2	Morecambe	Colchester
15:00 BST	Porter 4', 39' (pen.)	Report	Barkhuizen 27'; Molyneux 77'	Stadium: Colchester Community Stadium; Attendance: 2,815; Referee: Gavin Ward

29 October 2016 15	Plymouth Argyle	2–1	Colchester United	Plymouth
15:00 BST	Tanner 16'; Donaldson 87'	Report	Slater 31'	Stadium: Home Park; Attendance: 8,650; Referee: Kevin Johnson

12 November 2016 16	Colchester United	0–3	Leyton Orient	Colchester
15:00 GMT		Report	Simpson 11', 66'; Hunt 46'	Stadium: Colchester Community Stadium; Attendance: 7,003; Referee: Dean Whitestone

19 November 2016 17	Yeovil Town	2–1	Colchester United	Yeovil
15:00 GMT	Zoko 86'; Campbell 90'	Report	Guthrie 49'	Stadium: Huish Park; Attendance: 2,985; Referee: Brett Huxtable

22 November 2016 18	Cheltenham Town	0–3	Colchester United	Cheltenham
19:45 GMT	Pell (yellow card) 42' (yellow-red card) 87'	Report	Slater 48'; Dickenson 65'; Eastman 68'	Stadium: Whaddon Road; Attendance: 2,276; Referee: Mark Haywood

26 November 2016 19	Colchester United	4–0	Crewe Alexandra	Colchester
15:00 GMT	Guthrie 20'; Garvan 72'; Drey Wright 76'; Dickenson 90+2'	Report		Stadium: Colchester Community Stadium; Attendance: 2,931; Referee: Nick Kinseley

10 December 2016 20	Mansfield Town	0–0	Colchester United	Mansfield
15:00 GMT		Report		Stadium: Field Mill; Attendance: 3,398; Referee: Darren Deadman

17 December 2016 21	Colchester United	2–1	Notts County	Colchester
15:00 GMT	Guthrie 24'; Duffy 77' (o.g.)	Report	Hewitt 17'	Stadium: Colchester Community Stadium; Attendance: 3,385; Referee: Ross Joyce

26 December 2016 22	Luton Town	0–1	Colchester United	Luton
15:00 GMT		Report	Slater 83'	Stadium: Kenilworth Road; Attendance: 9,164; Referee: Gavin Ward

31 December 2016 23	Stevenage	2–4	Colchester United	Stevenage
15:00 GMT	Kennedy 40'; Godden 51'	Report	Dickenson 15'; Guthrie 19' (pen.); Porter 81'; Fosu 90+1'	Stadium: Broadhall Way; Attendance: 3,076; Referee: Graham Horwood

2 January 2017 24	Colchester United	2–0	Cheltenham Town	Colchester
15:00 GMT	Eastman 10'; Dickenson 84'	Report		Stadium: Colchester Community Stadium; Attendance: 3,840; Referee: Dean Whitestone

7 January 2017 25	Colchester United	4–1	Carlisle United	Colchester
15:00 GMT	Porter 11'; Guthrie 33', 50', 90+5'	Report	Brisley 28'	Stadium: Colchester Community Stadium; Attendance: 3,525; Referee: Lee Swabey

14 January 2017 26	Newport County	1–1	Colchester United	Newport
15:00 GMT	Sheehan 23'	Report	Porter 35' (pen.)	Stadium: Rodney Parade; Attendance: 2,397; Referee: Michael Salisbury

21 January 2017 27	Exeter City	3–0	Colchester United	Exeter
15:00 GMT	Reid 20'; Wheeler 77'; McAlinden 89'	Report		Stadium: St James Park; Attendance: 4,114; Referee: Robert Lewis

4 February 2017 28	Blackpool	1–1	Colchester United	Blackpool
15:00 GMT	Matt 12'	Report	Guthrie 18'; Murray (red card) 90+5'	Stadium: Bloomfield Road; Attendance: 2,772; Referee: Seb Stockbridge

11 February 2017 29	Colchester United	2–1	Barnet	Colchester
15:00 GMT	Guthrie 18'; Dickenson 42'	Report	Akinde 86'	Stadium: Colchester Community Stadium; Attendance: 3,606; Referee: John Busby

14 February 2017 30	Colchester United	2–3	Crawley Town	Colchester
19:45 GMT	Johnstone 18'; Dickenson 90+3'	Report	Smith 23', 34', 51'	Stadium: Colchester Community Stadium; Attendance: 2,675; Referee: Lee Collins

18 February 2017 31	Accrington Stanley	2–1	Colchester United	Accrington
15:00 GMT	Kee 18'; Pearson 32'; Beckles (red card) 45'	Report	Porter 76' (pen.)	Stadium: Crown Ground; Attendance: 1,310; Referee: Richard Clark

21 February 2017 32	Colchester United	1–0	Wycombe Wanderers	Colchester
19:45 GMT	Elokobi 13'	Report	Jacobson (yellow card) 76' (yellow-red card) 88'	Stadium: Colchester Community Stadium; Attendance: 3,031; Referee: Trevor Kettle

25 February 2017 33	Colchester United	2–1	Hartlepool United	Colchester
15:00 GMT	Guthrie 63'; Porter 78' (pen.)	Report	Thomas 82'	Stadium: Colchester Community Stadium; Attendance: 3,357; Referee: Ben Toner

28 February 2017 34	Grimsby Town	1–0	Colchester United	Cleethorpes
19:45 GMT	Jones 42'	Report		Stadium: Blundell Park; Attendance: 4,186; Referee: Darren Drysdale

4 March 2017 35	Cambridge United	1–1	Colchester United	Cambridge
15:00 GMT	McDonagh 20'	Report	Szmodics 84'	Stadium: Abbey Stadium; Attendance: 5,708; Referee: Eddie Ilderton

11 March 2017 36	Colchester United	0–4	Portsmouth	Colchester
15:00 GMT		Report	E. Doyle 22'; Bennett 46'; Rose 61'; M. Doyle 74'	Stadium: Colchester Community Stadium; Attendance: 6,504; Referee: Darren England

14 March 2017 37	Colchester United	2–0	Mansfield Town	Colchester
19:45 GMT	Dickenson 20'; Szmodics 28'	Report		Stadium: Colchester Community Stadium; Attendance: 2,526; Referee: Nick Kinseley

18 March 2017 38	Crewe Alexandra	2–0	Colchester United	Crewe
15:00 GMT	Dagnall 26', 84'	Report		Stadium: Gresty Road; Attendance: 3,407; Referee: Graham Horwood

25 March 2017 39	Colchester United	2–1	Luton Town	Colchester
15:00 GMT	Porter 4', 31'	Report	Vassell 90+3'	Stadium: Colchester Community Stadium; Attendance: 5,445; Referee: Gavin Ward

1 April 2017 40	Notts County	3–1	Colchester United	Nottingham
15:00 GMT	Hollis 8'; Ameobi 34', 73'	Report	Porter 21'	Stadium: Meadow Lane; Attendance: 6,104; Referee: Darren Handley

8 April 2017 41	Colchester United	4–0	Stevenage	Colchester
15:00 GMT	Dickenson 12'; Porter 30'; McQuoid 34' (o.g.); Lee 39' (o.g.)	Report		Stadium: Colchester Community Stadium; Attendance: 3,583; Referee: Chris Sarginson

14 April 2017 42	Colchester United	1–1	Doncaster Rovers	Colchester
15:00 GMT	Dickenson 16'	Report	Baudry 45+2'	Stadium: Colchester Community Stadium; Attendance: 4,720; Referee: David Webb

17 April 2017 43	Morecambe	1–1	Colchester United	Morecambe
15:00 GMT	Rose 88' (pen.)	Report	Brindley 22'	Stadium: Globe Arena; Attendance: 1,447; Referee: Seb Stockbridge

22 April 2017 44	Colchester United	0–0	Plymouth Argyle	Colchester
15:00 GMT		Report		Stadium: Colchester Community Stadium; Attendance: 5,432; Referee: Darren Handley

29 April 2017 45	Leyton Orient	1–3	Colchester United	Leyton
15:00 GMT	Semedo 52'	Report	Fosu 26'; Porter 78'; Bonne 80'	Stadium: Brisbane Road; Attendance: 6,854; Referee: Carl Boyeson

6 May 2017 46	Colchester United	2–0	Yeovil Town	Colchester
17:30 GMT	Fosu 36', 77'	Report		Stadium: Colchester Community Stadium; Attendance: 6,565; Referee: Robert Jones

=== EFL Cup ===
9 August 2016 First round	Brighton & Hove Albion	4–0	Colchester United	Falmer
19:45 BST	Baldock 64'; Murphy 70', 86'; Manu 74'	Report		Stadium: Falmer Stadium; Attendance: 6,895; Referee: James Linington

=== EFL Trophy ===
Pos	Div	Team	Pld	W	PW	PL	L	GF	GA	GD	Pts	Qualification
1	ACA	Southampton U21	3	2	0	1	0	6	1	+5	7	Advance to Round 2
2	L2	Crawley Town	3	2	0	0	1	3	4	−1	6	Advance to Round 2
3	L1	Charlton Athletic	3	0	1	1	1	1	3	−2	3	
4	L2	Colchester United	3	0	1	0	2	2	4	−2	2	

Source: Sky Sports

30 August 2016 Group stage 1	Crawley Town	1–0	Colchester United	Crawley
19:45 BST	Collins 34'	Report		Stadium: Broadfield Stadium; Attendance: 881

4 October 2016 Group stage 2	Colchester United	1–2	Southampton U23	Colchester
19:45 BST	Sembie-Ferris 23'	Report	McQueen 8'; Olomola 51'	Stadium: Colchester Community Stadium; Attendance: 791

8 November 2016 Group stage 3	Colchester United	1–1 (4–3 p)	Charlton Athletic	Colchester
19:45 GMT	Bonne 42'	Report	Ajose 32'	Stadium: Colchester Community Stadium; Attendance: 548
	Penalties
	Guthrie (penalty scored); Bonne (penalty scored); Dunne (penalty missed); Wright (penalty scored); Slater (penalty scored)		Hanlan (penalty scored); Ulvestad (penalty scored); Ahearne-Grant (penalty missed); Teixeira (penalty scored); Konsa (penalty missed)

=== FA Cup ===
5 November 2016 First round	Colchester United	1–2	Chesterfield	Colchester
15:00 GMT	Fosu 46'	Report	O'Shea 23'; Evans 50'	Stadium: Colchester Community Stadium; Attendance: 1,840; Referee: Lee Probert

== Squad statistics ==
=== Appearances and goals ===
As of 6 May 2017

No.	Pos	Nat	Player	Total		League Two		FA Cup		EFL Cup		EFL Trophy	
No.	Pos	Nat	Player	Apps	Goals	Apps	Goals	Apps	Goals	Apps	Goals	Apps	Goals
1	GK	(England) ENG	Sam Walker	48	0	46	0	1	0	0	0	1	0
2	DF	(England) ENG	Richard Brindley	43	1	40+1	1	1	0	0	0	0+1	0
3	DF	(Guyana) GUY	Matthew Briggs	15	0	11+4	0	0	0	0	0	0	0
4	MF	(England) ENG	Tom Lapslie	40	0	37	0	0	0	1	0	2	0
5	DF	(England) ENG	Luke Prosser	17	0	14	0	1	0	1	0	1	0
6	DF	(England) ENG	Frankie Kent	15	0	13	0	0	0	1	0	1	0
7	FW	(England) ENG	Drey Wright	46	2	31+11	2	1	0	0	0	3	0
8	DF	(England) ENG	Doug Loft	9	0	2+6	0	0	0	1	0	0	0
9	FW	(England) ENG	Chris Porter	39	16	32+6	16	0	0	0	0	0+1	0
10	MF	(England) ENG	Sammie Szmodics	23	5	16+3	5	1	0	1	0	2	0
11	FW	(England) ENG	Brennan Dickenson	39	12	35+1	12	0	0	1	0	1+1	0
12	DF	(England) ENG	Kane Vincent-Young	23	0	6+12	0	1	0	1	0	3	0
14	DF	(England) ENG	Alex Wynter	20	0	10+5	0	1	0	1	0	3	0
15	DF	(Cameroon) CMR	George Elokobi	29	1	29	1	0	0	0	0	0	0
16	FW	(England) ENG	Femi Akinwande	1	0	0+1	0	0	0	0	0	0	0
17	FW	(Scotland) SCO	Denny Johnstone	32	2	15+13	2	1	0	1	0	2	0
18	DF	(England) ENG	Tom Eastman	38	3	35	3	1	0	0	0	2	0
19	FW	(Zimbabwe) ZIM	Macauley Bonne	22	2	1+17	1	0+1	0	0+1	0	2	1
21	FW	(England) ENG	Dion Sembie-Ferris	9	1	0+7	0	0	0	0	0	2	1
23	MF	(Republic of Ireland) IRL	Sean Murray	16	0	15+1	0	0	0	0	0	0	0
24	MF	(Scotland) SCO	Craig Slater	32	3	23+5	3	1	0	0+1	0	1+1	0
25	GK	(England) ENG	Dillon Barnes	2	0	0	0	0	0	1	0	1	0
28	FW	(England) ENG	Kurtis Guthrie	36	12	32+1	12	1	0	1	0	1	0
30	DF	(Jamaica) JAM	Lloyd Doyley	3	0	2+1	0	0	0	0	0	0	0
32	MF	(Wales) WAL	Tommy O'Sullivan	3	0	0+3	0	0	0	0	0	0	0
33	DF	(England) ENG	Lewis Kinsella	15	0	11+2	0	0	0	0	0	2	0
35	DF	(England) ENG	Cameron James	15	0	13+1	0	0	0	0	0	0+1	0
39	FW	(Wales) WAL	Charley Edge	1	0	0+1	0	0	0	0	0	0	0
40	DF	(England) ENG	Dexter Peter	1	0	0	0	0	0	0	0	0+1	0
41	MF	(Republic of Ireland) IRL	Louis Dunne	3	0	0	0	0+1	0	0+1	0	0+1	0
44	MF	(England) ENG	Diaz Wright	1	0	0	0	0	0	0	0	0+1	0
46	FW	(England) ENG	Tariq Issa	1	0	0	0	0	0	0	0	0+1	0
Players who appeared for Colchester who left during the season
22	MF	(Republic of Ireland) IRL	Owen Garvan	18	1	18	1	0	0	0	0	0	0
27	FW	(England) ENG	Rekeil Pyke	12	0	4+8	0	0	0	0	0	0	0
29	GK	(England) ENG	James Bransgrove	1	0	0	0	0	0	0	0	1	0
31	MF	(England) ENG	Tarique Fosu	34	6	14+19	5	0+1	1	0	0	0	0
32	MF	(Finland) FIN	Glen Kamara	6	0	1+3	0	0	0	0	0	2	0

=== Goalscorers ===
Place	Number	Nation	Position	Name	League Two	FA Cup	EFL Cup	EFL Trophy	Total
1	9	(England)	FW	Chris Porter	16	0	0	0	16
2	28	(England)	FW	Kurtis Guthrie	12	0	0	0	12
2	11	(England)	FW	Brennan Dickenson	12	0	0	0	12
4	31	(England)	MF	Tarique Fosu	5	1	0	0	6
5	10	(England)	MF	Sammie Szmodics	5	0	0	0	5
6	18	(England)	DF	Tom Eastman	3	0	0	0	3
6	24	(Scotland)	MF	Craig Slater	3	0	0	0	3
8	19	(Zimbabwe)	FW	Macauley Bonne	1	0	0	1	2
8	17	(Scotland)	FW	Denny Johnstone	2	0	0	0	2
8	7	(England)	FW	Drey Wright	2	0	0	0	2
11	2	(England)	DF	Richard Brindley	1	0	0	0	1
11	15	(Cameroon)	DF	George Elokobi	1	0	0	0	1
11	22	(Republic of Ireland)	MF	Owen Garvan	1	0	0	0	1
11	21	(England)	FW	Dion Sembie-Ferris	0	0	0	1	1
				Own goals	3	0	0	0	3
				TOTALS	67	1	0	2	70

=== Disciplinary record ===
Number	Nationality	Position	Player	League Two		FA Cup		EFL Cup		EFL Trophy		Total	
Number	Nationality	Position	Player	Yellow card	Red card	Yellow card	Red card	Yellow card	Red card	Yellow card	Red card	Yellow card	Red card
4	(England)	MF	Tom Lapslie	7	0	0	0	0	0	0	0	7	0
15	(Cameroon)	DF	George Elokobi	6	0	0	0	0	0	0	0	6	0
28	(England)	FW	Kurtis Guthrie	5	0	1	0	0	0	0	0	6	0
18	(England)	DF	Tom Eastman	5	0	0	0	0	0	0	0	5	0
31	(England)	MF	Tarique Fosu	5	0	0	0	0	0	0	0	5	0
33	(England)	DF	Lewis Kinsella	2	0	0	0	0	0	2	0	4	0
23	(Republic of Ireland)	MF	Sean Murray	1	1	0	0	0	0	0	0	1	1
5	(England)	DF	Luke Prosser	3	0	0	0	0	0	1	0	4	0
7	(England)	FW	Drey Wright	4	0	0	0	0	0	0	0	4	0
2	(England)	DF	Richard Brindley	3	0	0	0	0	0	0	0	3	0
11	(England)	FW	Brennan Dickenson	3	0	0	0	0	0	0	0	3	0
8	(England)	MF	Doug Loft	2	0	0	0	1	0	0	0	3	0
24	(Scotland)	MF	Craig Slater	3	0	0	0	0	0	0	0	3	0
19	(Zimbabwe)	FW	Macauley Bonne	0	0	0	0	0	0	2	0	2	0
3	(Guyana)	DF	Matthew Briggs	2	0	0	0	0	0	0	0	2	0
22	(Republic of Ireland)	MF	Owen Garvan	2	0	0	0	0	0	0	0	2	0
35	(England)	DF	Cameron James	2	0	0	0	0	0	0	0	2	0
6	(England)	DF	Frankie Kent	1	0	0	0	1	0	0	0	2	0
14	(England)	DF	Alex Wynter	2	0	0	0	0	0	0	0	2	0
30	(Jamaica)	DF	Lloyd Doyley	1	0	0	0	0	0	0	0	1	0
17	(Scotland)	FW	Denny Johnstone	1	0	0	0	0	0	0	0	1	0
9	(England)	FW	Chris Porter	1	0	0	0	0	0	0	0	1	0
27	(England)	FW	Rekeil Pyke	1	0	0	0	0	0	0	0	1	0
10	(England)	MF	Sammie Szmodics	0	0	0	0	0	0	1	0	1	0
			TOTALS	59	1	1	0	2	0	6	0	68	1

=== Player debuts ===
Players making their first-team Colchester United debut in a fully competitive match.

Number	Position	Player	Date	Opponent	Ground	Notes
5	DF	(England) Luke Prosser	6 August 2016	Hartlepool United	Victoria Park	
33	DF	(England) Lewis Kinsella	6 August 2016	Hartlepool United	Victoria Park	
24	MF	(Scotland) Craig Slater	6 August 2016	Hartlepool United	Victoria Park	
28	FW	(England) Kurtis Guthrie	6 August 2016	Hartlepool United	Victoria Park	
17	FW	(Scotland) Denny Johnstone	6 August 2016	Hartlepool United	Victoria Park	
25	GK	(England) Dillon Barnes	9 August 2016	Brighton & Hove Albion	Falmer Stadium	
8	MF	(England) Doug Loft	9 August 2016	Brighton & Hove Albion	Falmer Stadium	
11	FW	(England) Brennan Dickenson	9 August 2016	Brighton & Hove Albion	Falmer Stadium	
44	MF	(England) Diaz Wright	30 August 2016	Crawley Town	Broadfield Stadium	
40	DF	(England) Dexter Peter	30 August 2016	Crawley Town	Broadfield Stadium	
31	MF	(England) Tarique Fosu	3 September 2016	Exeter City	Colchester Community Stadium	
32	MF	(Finland) Glen Kamara	10 September 2016	Blackpool	Colchester Community Stadium	
46	FW	(England) Tariq Issa	4 October 2016	Southampton U23	Colchester Community Stadium	
30	DF	(Jamaica) Lloyd Doyley	29 October 2016	Plymouth Argyle	Home Park	
23	DF	(Republic of Ireland) Sean Murray	4 February 2017	Blackpool	Bloomfield Road	
27	FW	(England) Rekeil Pyke	14 February 2017	Crawley Town	Colchester Community Stadium	
39	FW	(Wales) Charley Edge	14 February 2017	Crawley Town	Colchester Community Stadium	
32	MF	(Wales) Tommy O'Sullivan	8 April 2017	Stevenage	Colchester Community Stadium	

== Transfers and contracts ==
=== In ===
Date	Pos	Player	From	Fee	Ref
23 May 2016	DF	(England) Ben Wyatt	(England) Maldon & Tiptree	Free transfer	
21 June 2016	DF	(England) Luke Prosser	(England) Southend United	Free transfer	
28 June 2016	FW	(Scotland) Denny Johnstone	(England) Birmingham City	Undisclosed	
28 June 2016	FW	(England) Courtney Senior	(England) Brentford	Free transfer	
29 June 2016	DF	(England) Dexter Peter	(England) Chelmsford City	Free transfer	
29 June 2016	FW	(England) Brennan Dickenson	(England) Gillingham	Free transfer	
1 July 2016	MF	(England) Doug Loft	(England) Gillingham	Free transfer	
6 July 2016	FW	(England) Kurtis Guthrie	(England) Forest Green Rovers	Undisclosed	
7 July 2016	MF	(Scotland) Craig Slater	(Scotland) Kilmarnock	Undisclosed	
29 July 2016	DF	(England) Lewis Kinsella	(England) Aston Villa	Free transfer	
13 August 2016	DF	(England) Brendan Ocran	(England) Barnet	Free transfer	
29 August 2016	GK	(Wales) Rhys Williams	(England) Carlisle United	Free transfer	
7 October 2016	DF	(Jamaica) Lloyd Doyley	(England) Rotherham United	Free transfer	
22 December 2016	DF	(England) Jermaine Grandison	(England) Shrewsbury Town	Free transfer	
18 January 2017	FW	(Wales) Eli Phipps	(Wales) Cardiff City	Undisclosed	
20 January 2017	MF	(Wales) Tommy O'Sullivan	(Wales) Cardiff City	Undisclosed	
31 January 2017	GK	(England) Dean Brill	(Scotland) Motherwell	Free transfer	
31 January 2017	MF	(Republic of Ireland) Sean Murray	(England) Swindon Town	Free transfer	

=== Out ===
Date	Pos	Player	To	Fee	Ref
8 June 2016	FW	(England) Gavin Massey	(England) Leyton Orient	Undisclosed	
9 June 2016	FW	(Spain) David Segura	(Spain) CD Cabacense (Note: Following David Segura's release by Colchester United, he later joined CD Cabacense.)	Released	
21 June 2016	GK	(England) Elliot Parish	(England) Accrington Stanley (Note: Following Elliot Parish's release by Colchester United, he later joined Accrington Stanley.)	Released	
21 June 2016	MF	(England) Alex Gilbey	(England) Wigan Athletic	Undisclosed	
21 June 2016	MF	(England) George Moncur	(England) Barnsley	£500,000	
24 June 2016	MF	(England) Joe Edwards	(England) Walsall (Note: Following Joe Edwards's release by Colchester United, he later joined Walsall.)	Released	
1 July 2016	MF	(England) Darren Ambrose	Free agent	Released	
1 July 2016	DF	(England) Marley Andrews	(England) Heybridge Swifts (Note: Following Marley Andrews' release by Colchester United, he later joined Heybridge Swifts.)	Released	
1 July 2016	MF	(England) Kieran Bailey	(England) Soham Town Rangers (Note: Following Kieran Bailey's release by Colchester United, he later joined Soham Town Rangers.)	Released	
1 July 2016	MF	(England) Tyler Brampton	(England) Billericay Town (Note: Following Tyler Brampton's release by Colchester United, he later joined Billericay Town.)	Released	
1 July 2016	DF	(England) Tosin Olufemi	(England) Hayes & Yeading United (Note: Following Tosin Olufemi's release by Colchester United, he later joined Hayes & Yeading United.)	Released	
1 July 2016	DF	(England) Nicky Shorey	(England) Hungerford Town (Note: Following Nicky Shorey's release by Colchester United, he later joined Hungerford Town.)	Released	
1 July 2016	FW	(England) Marvin Sordell	(England) Coventry City (Note: Following Marvin Sordell's release by Colchester United, he later joined Coventry City.)	Released	
9 September 2016	DF	(Northern Ireland) Jamie Harney	(Northern Ireland) Cliftonville (Note: Following Jamie Harney's release by Colchester United, he later joined Cliftonville.)	Released	
21 December 2016	GK	(England) James Bransgrove	(England) Chelmsford City	Retired	
18 January 2017	MF	(England) Jack Curtis	(England) Harlow Town (Note: Following Jack Curtis' release by Colchester United, he later joined Harlow Town.)	Released	
20 January 2017	DF	(Republic of Ireland) Michael O'Donoghue	(England) Haringey Borough (Note: Following Michael O'Donoghue's release by Colchester United, he later joined Haringey Borough.)	Released	
30 January 2017	MF	(England) Chris Regis	(England) Sittingbourne (Note: Following Chris Regis' release by Colchester United, he later joined Sittingbourne.)	Released	
29 March 2017	DF	(England) Jermaine Grandison	Free agent	Released	
11 April 2017	MF	(Republic of Ireland) Owen Garvan	(Republic of Ireland) St Patrick's Athletic (Note: Following Owen Garvan's release by Colchester United, he later joined St Patrick's Athletic.)	Released	

=== Loans in ===
Date	Pos	Player	From	End date	Ref
31 August 2016	MF	(England) Tarique Fosu	(England) Reading	End of season (Note: On 12 January 2017, Tarique Fosu's loan was extended until the end of the season.)	
31 August 2016	MF	(Finland) Glen Kamara	(England) Arsenal	7 January 2017	
30 January 2017	FW	(England) Rekeil Pyke	(England) Huddersfield Town	End of season	

=== Loans out ===
Date	Pos	Player	To	End date	Ref
13 August 2016	DF	(England) JJ Wilson	(England) Maldon & Tiptree	11 September 2016	
13 August 2016	MF	(England) Jack Curtis	(England) Needham Market	17 December 2016 (Note: On 10 September 2016, Jack Curtis' loan was extended.) (Note: On 13 October 2016, Jack Curtis' loan was further extended until 12 November 2016.)	
2 September 2016	FW	(Zimbabwe) Macauley Bonne	(England) Lincoln City	13 October 2016	
4 October 2016	DF	(Cameroon) George Elokobi	(England) Braintree Town	22 November 2016 (Note: On 11 November 2016, George Elokobi's loan was extended.)	
21 October 2016	FW	(England) Femi Akinwande	(England) Bishop's Stortford	17 December 2016	
25 October 2016	MF	(England) Callum Harrison	(England) Needham Market	21 January 2017	
28 October 2016	DF	(England) Ben Wyatt	(England) Concord Rangers	29 April 2017	
9 December 2016	FW	(England) Eoin McKeown	(England) Maldon & Tiptree	28 January 2017	
22 December 2016	FW	(England) Dion Sembie-Ferris	(England) Concord Rangers	29 April 2017 (Note: On 24 February 2017, Dion Sembie-Ferris' loan was extended until the end of the season.)	
27 January 2017	FW	(Zimbabwe) Macauley Bonne	(England) Woking	28 February 2017	
3 February 2017	FW	(England) Femi Akinwande	(England) Maldon & Tiptree	1 March 2017	
3 March 2017	FW	(England) Femi Akinwande	(England) East Thurrock United	3 April 2017	

=== Contracts ===
New contracts and contract extensions.

Date	Pos	Player	Length	Contracted until	Ref
23 May 2016	DF	(England) Ben Wyatt	1 year	May 2017	
25 May 2016	FW	(England) Drey Wright	1 year	May 2017	
26 May 2016	MF	(England) Jack Curtis	1 year	May 2017	
2 June 2016	GK	(England) Dillon Barnes	3 years	May 2019	
21 June 2016	DF	(England) Luke Prosser	2 years	May 2018	
21 June 2016	MF	(England) Sammie Szmodics	3 years	May 2019	
22 June 2016	FW	(England) Macauley Bonne	2 years	May 2018	
28 June 2016	FW	(Scotland) Denny Johnstone	2 years	May 2018	
28 June 2016	FW	(England) Courtney Senior	2 years	May 2018	
29 June 2016	DF	(England) Dexter Peter	1 year	May 2017	
29 June 2016	FW	(England) Brennan Dickenson	2 years	May 2018	
30 June 2016	DF	(England) JJ Wilson	1 year	May 2017	
30 June 2016	MF	(England) Diaz Wright	1 year	May 2017	
30 June 2016	FW	(England) George Brown	1 year	May 2017	
30 June 2016	FW	(England) Decarrey Sheriff	1 year	May 2017	
4 July 2016	DF	(England) Cameron James	4 years	May 2020	
4 July 2016	FW	(England) Tariq Issa	4 years	May 2020	
5 July 2016	DF	(England) Tom Eastman	1 year	May 2017	
6 July 2016	DF	(Northern Ireland) Jamie Harney	1 year	May 2017	
6 July 2016	FW	(England) Kurtis Guthrie	2 years	May 2018	
7 July 2016	FW	(England) Femi Akinwande	1 year	May 2017	
7 July 2016	MF	(Scotland) Craig Slater	2 years	May 2018	
29 July 2016	DF	(England) Lewis Kinsella	1 year	May 2017	
13 August 2016	DF	(England) Brendan Ocran	1 year	May 2017	
29 August 2016	GK	(Wales) Rhys Williams	1 year	May 2017	
7 October 2016	DF	(Jamaica) Lloyd Doyley	1 year	May 2017	
22 December 2016	DF	(England) Jermaine Grandison	6 months	May 2017	
18 January 2017	FW	(Wales) Eli Phipps	1½ years	May 2018	
20 January 2017	MF	(Wales) Tommy O'Sullivan	1½ years	May 2018	
31 January 2017	GK	(England) Dean Brill	6 months	May 2017	
31 January 2017	MF	(Republic of Ireland) Sean Murray	1½ years	May 2018	

== Honours and awards ==
=== End-of-season awards ===
Award	Player	Notes
Player of the Year award	(England) Brennan Dickenson	
Young Player of the Year award	(England) Tom Lapslie	
Player's Player of the Year award	(England) Brennan Dickenson	
Goal of the Season award	(Cameroon) George Elokobi	
Community Player of the Year award	(England) Luke Prosser	
Colchester United Supporters Association Home Player of the Year award	(Cameroon) George Elokobi	
Colchester United Supporters Association Away Player of the Year award	(England) Tom Eastman	

== See also ==
- List of Colchester United F.C. seasons
