= Lewis Kinsella =

British association football player

Personal information
- Full name: Lewis Kinsella
- Date of birth: 2 September 1994 (age 32)
- Place of birth: Watford, England
- Height: 5 ft 9 in (1.75 m)
- Position: Left back

Youth career
- 2003–2011: Arsenal
- 2011–2015: Aston Villa

Senior career*
Years	Team	Apps	(Gls)
2015–2016	Aston Villa	0	(0)
2014	→ Luton Town (loan)	3	(0)
2015–2016	→ Kidderminster Harriers (loan)	13	(0)
2016–2018	Colchester United	29	(0)
2018	→ Aldershot Town (loan)	3	(0)
2018–2022	Aldershot Town	141	(4)
2022–2023	Wealdstone	12	(0)
2023	→ Gosport Borough (loan)	5	(0)
2023–2024	Maidenhead United	11	(0)
2024	→ Hayes & Yeading United (loan)	3	(1)
- * Club domestic league appearances and goals as of 22:39, 29 January 2024 (UTC)

Lewis Kinsella (born 2 September 1994) is an English former professional footballer who played as a left back. He currently works as a talent scout for Arsenal.

Kinsella came up through Arsenal's youth academy, where he spent eight years, before moving to Aston Villa's academy in 2011. He made his professional debut on loan at Luton Town in 2015, making three appearances. Kinsella made 13 appearances on loan at Kidderminster Harriers in 2016, before being released in the summer of that year. He joined Colchester United in July 2016 and went on loan to Aldershot Town in January 2018. He made a permanent move to Aldershot at the end of January 2018 before leaving the club four years later, in which he collated just shy of 150 appearances.

== Career ==
=== Aston Villa ===
Born in Watford, Hertfordshire, Kinsella spent eight years in the Arsenal's youth academy, representing the club from under-8 to under-16 levels, before being released and joined Aston Villa's academy in 2011. During his first season with the club, Kinsella played in all but one of the club's matches in the 2011–12 NextGen Series. Despite missing the group games of the competition during the 2012–13 NextGen Series, he later returned to help the club win the competition.

Kinsella was called up to first-team training by manager Tim Sherwood in March 2015 following injuries to regular left backs Aly Cissokho and Kieran Richardson. He was named in the matchday squad for the first time on 7 March 2015 for Villa's FA Cup quarter-final tie against West Bromwich Albion, though he remained an unused substitute in a 2–0 victory. On 26 March 2015, Kinsella joined League Two club Luton Town on loan until the end of 2014–15. He made his professional debut two days later, playing the full 90 minutes of a 2–1 defeat away to Northampton Town. He completed the loan spell with three appearances. Following his return to parent club Aston Villa, Kinsella signed a new one-year contract in June 2015.

On 18 February 2016, Kinsella joined National League club Kidderminster Harriers on a one-month loan. He debuted two days later, starting Kidderminster's 2–2 draw at home to Chester. Kinsella made six appearances before extending his loan with the club on 21 March until the end of 2015–16, finishing the loan spell with 13 appearances. After the end of the season, Kinsella announced Aston Villa had not offered him a new contract and left the club after five years.

=== Colchester United ===
During the summer of 2016, Kinsella received offers from two English Football League clubs, but both fell through. He then spent a week training with Swindon Town, and his former loan club Luton. After impressing in two trial matches against Crystal Palace and Ipswich Town for Colchester United, Kinsella signed a one-year contract with the League Two club on 29 July 2016. He debuted in Colchester's 1–1 draw away to Hartlepool United on the opening day of 2016–17. Kinsella made 14 appearances during the early months of the season, but sustained an injury in the latter, a 0–0 draw with Newport County on 8 October. He required surgery on his ankle that ruled him out of action for three months. Kinsella ended the season with just one further appearance following his injury, bringing his total to 15 for the season. He signed a new one-year contract with Colchester on 29 June 2017.

=== Aldershot Town ===
He joined National League club Aldershot Town on loan for one month on 4 January 2018. Kinsella made his Aldershot debut two days later in their 2–1 away win over Dover Athletic. On 31 January 2018, Kinsella signed for Aldershot permanently on a contract until the end of 2017–18, after leaving Colchester by mutual consent. He signed a new one-year contract with the club on 11 May 2018.

In the summer of 2020, Kinsella made national news as he sought to crowdfund money to pay for an operation after a serious MCL injury. This prompted over £10,000 in donations, including £1,000 from the Aldershot board of directors and £2,000 from former Aston Villa teammate Jack Grealish.

On 23 October 2021, Kinsella scored his first senior goal to give his side a 2–1 lead over Bromley before the away side came from behind for a second time in the match to earn a 3–2 win.

On 5 June 2022, Kinsella announced he would be leaving the club after failing to agree new terms ahead of the 2022–23 campaign, leaving the Hampshire-based side after a four-year spell.

=== Wealdstone ===
On 8 July 2022, Kinsella signed for National League side Wealdstone. On 6 August 2022 he made his debut for the club in a 3–2 victory over Bromley. In March 2023, he joined Southern League Premier Division South side Gosport Borough on a 28 day loan. He left the Stones at the end of the season, having made 14 appearances.

=== Maidenhead United ===
Kinsella joined Maidenhead United for the 2023–24 season. He left the club at the end of the season after twelve appearances.

=== Hayes & Yeading United ===
On 3 January 2024, Kinsella signed for Southern Football League side Hayes & Yeading United on a 28 day loan deal.

He announced his retirement on 8 June 2024.

== Career statistics ==
As of match played 27 January 2024

Appearances and goals by club, season and competition
Club	Season	League			FA Cup		League Cup		Other		Total	
Club	Season	Division	Apps	Goals	Apps	Goals	Apps	Goals	Apps	Goals	Apps	Goals
Aston Villa	2014–15	Premier League	0	0	0	0	0	0	—		0	0
Aston Villa	2015–16	Premier League	0	0	0	0	0	0	—		0	0
Aston Villa	Total		0	0	0	0	0	0	—		0	0
Luton Town (loan)	2014–15	League Two	3	0	—		—		—		3	0
Kidderminster Harriers (loan)	2015–16	National League	13	0	—		—		—		13	0
Colchester United	2016–17	League Two	13	0	0	0	0	0	2 (Note: Appearances in EFL Trophy)	0	15	0
Colchester United	2017–18	League Two	9	0	1	0	1	0	3	0	14	0
Colchester United	Total		22	0	1	0	1	0	5	0	29	0
Aldershot Town	2017–18	National League	18	0	—		—		1 (Note: Appearance in National League play-offs)	0	19	0
Aldershot Town	2018–19	National League	33	0	3	0	—		1 (Note: Appearance in FA Trophy)	0	37	0
Aldershot Town	2019–20	National League	34	0	1	0	—		1	0	36	0
Aldershot Town	2020–21	National League	13	0	0	0	—		0	0	13	0
Aldershot Town	2021–22	National League	33	4	1	0	—		2	0	36	4
Aldershot Town	Total		131	4	5	0	—		5	0	141	4
Wealdstone	2022–23	National League	12	0	0	0	—		2 (Note: 1 appearance in Middlesex Senior Cup, 1 appearance and 1 goal in Middlesex Senior Charity Cup)	1	14	1
Gosport Borough (loan)	2022–23	SFL Premier Division South	5	0	0	0	—		0	0	5	0
Maidenhead United	2023–24	National League	9	0	1	0	—		2 (Note: One appearance in FA Trophy, one appearance in Berks & Bucks Senior Cup)	0	12	0
Hayes & Yeading United (loan)	2023–24	SFL Premier Division South	3	1	0	0	—		0	0	3	1
Career total			198	5	7	0	1	0	14	1	220	6

== Honours ==
Aston Villa

- NextGen Series: 2012–13
