= Femi Akinwande =

English footballer (born 1995)

Personal information
- Full name: Obafemi Karl Akinwande
- Date of birth: 19 September 1995 (age 31)
- Height: 1.78 m (5 ft 10 in)
- Position: Striker

Team information
- Current team: SE Dons

Youth career
- 2004–2013: Millwall
- 2013–2014: Dartford

Senior career*
| Years | Team | Apps | (Gls) |
| 2013–2015 | Dartford | 1 | (0) |
| 2014 | → Walton Casuals (loan) | 0 | (0) |
| 2014 | → Leatherhead (loan) | 0 | (0) |
| 2015 | Fisher | 12 | (4) |
| 2015 | Maldon & Tiptree | 15 | (11) |
| 2015–2017 | Colchester United | 3 | (0) |
| 2016 | → Bishop's Stortford (loan) | 7 | (3) |
| 2017 | → Maldon & Tiptree (loan) | 4 | (4) |
| 2017 | → East Thurrock United (loan) | 6 | (4) |
| 2017 | East Thurrock United | 8 | (1) |
| 2017–2018 | Concord Rangers | 24 | (5) |
| 2018–2019 | Haringey Borough | 34 | (7) |
| 2019 | Braintree Town | 18 | (6) |
| 2019–2020 | Billericay Town | 16 | (6) |
| 2020–2021 | Stevenage | 7 | (0) |
| 2021 | → Dartford (loan) | 5 | (0) |
| 2021 | Braintree Town | 14 | (1) |
| 2021–2022 | Billericay Town | 22 | (7) |
| 2022 | Tonbridge Angels | 3 | (1) |
| 2022–2023 | Carshalton Athletic | 33 | (8) |
| 2023 | Hastings United | 9 | (5) |
| 2023–2024 | Hornchurch | 44 | (20) |
| 2024–2025 | Billericay Town | 34 | (16) |
| 2025 | Welling United | 11 | (1) |
| 2025–2026 | Potters Bar Town | 12 | (0) |
| 2026– | SE Dons | 2 | (2) |
- * Club domestic league appearances and goals as of 29:00, 5th April 2026 (UTC)

Obafemi Karl Akinwande (born 19 September 1995) is an English professional footballer who plays as a striker for club SE Dons.

Akinwande began his career in Millwall's youth academy and spent nine years there before joining Dartford in 2013. During his time at Dartford, he spent time on loan at Walton Casuals and Leatherhead respectively. He signed for Fisher in January 2015. Akinwande then joined Maldon & Tiptree for the 2015–16 season, and after 12 goals in 18 appearances in just three months with the club, he joined Colchester United's academy on a development contract until the end of the season. He made his professional Football League debut for Colchester in March 2016. He later joined Bishop's Stortford, made a return to Maldon & Tiptree, and played for East Thurrock United on loan in the 2016–17 season.

Akinwande was released by Colchester in May 2017 and returned to East Thurrock on a permanent basis ahead of the 2017–18 season. A move to Concord Rangers of the National League South followed in October 2017, before joining Isthmian League Premier Division club Haringey Borough for the 2018–19 season. He moved back up to National League South level when he joined Braintree Town before the start of the 2019–20 season. He signed for Billericay Town in November 2019 and spent the remainder of the campaign there. Akinwande made a return into the Football League when he signed for League Two club Stevenage in June 2020.

== Career ==
=== Early career ===
Akinwande began his career with Millwall at the age of seven, and remained in the club's academy for nine years. After his release by Millwall, he signed for Conference Premier club Dartford in the summer of 2013. He made three brief substitute appearances in three different cup competitions during his first season at Dartford. He made his debut in the club's 1–0 win against Charlton Athletic in the Kent Senior Cup on 17 October 2013, and then made his Dartford league debut as a late substitute in a 1–0 home defeat against Forest Green on 12 April 2014.

Having featured predominantly for the club's academy team the previous season, Akinwande was promoted to Dartford's first-team squad ahead of the 2014–15 season. Before the season started, Akinwande had trials with Brentford and Crystal Palace respectively. He first lined up for Brentford in a pre-season friendly in late July, and also played in their 2–1 victory over Maidenhead United for the club's Development Squad on 22 July 2014. A few days later, he was included in the Crystal Palace under-21 squad in a 3–2 victory at Dulwich Hamlet in another pre-season friendly. No move materialised and Akinwande remained with Dartford for the 2014–15 season. He was one of four players loaned to Isthmian League Division One South club Walton Casuals, although ultimately made no appearances during the brief loan agreement. He was then loaned to Isthmian League Premier Division club Leatherhead for a month in November 2014. He played for the club on six occasions during the month-long loan; four times in the FA Trophy, once in the Isthmian League Cup, and once in the Surrey Senior Cup.

Akinwande left Dartford to sign for Fisher in January 2015. He made his debut on 5 January 2015 in their 3–1 defeat by Tunbridge Wells in the Southern Counties East Football League Challenge Cup and scored his first goals during a 2–2 league draw with Phoenix Sports on 8 March 2015. He went on to score four goals in 13 league and cup appearances. He left Fisher at the end of the season to join Isthmian League Division One North club Maldon & Tiptree. He scored on his debut in manager David Wright's first game in charge, as they won 2–1 against Phoenix Sports on 8 August 2015. He scored four goals in his first five games for the club and went on to score 12 times in 18 games in all competitions during his time there.

=== Colchester United ===
Akinwande's performances for Maldon & Tiptree earned him a trial with League One club Colchester United's academy, where he featured in two games for the club's Development Squad in November 2015. He signed a professional contract with the club until the end of the 2015–16 season, remaining in the Development Squad. Akinwande was named in the first-team squad for the first time on 20 February 2016; he was handed the number 16 shirt and was an unused substitute in Colchester's 5–2 defeat at Bury. He made his professional debut on 12 March 2016 when manager Kevin Keen named Akinwande in the starting eleven to face Wigan Athletic at the Colchester Community Stadium. He played the first 45-minutes in an eventual 3–3 draw. He was offered a new contract by Colchester at the end of the season, subsequently agreeing a new one-year deal with Colchester on 7 July 2016.

Having made one first-team appearance for Colchester during the opening two months of the 2016–17 season, Akinwande joined National League South club Bishop's Stortford on 21 October 2016, on loan for one month. He scored on his debut as Stortford lost 5–1 at home to St Albans City on 22 October 2016. He scored six goals in ten games in all competitions during the loan agreement. Akinwande made a loan return to Maldon & Tiptree on 3 February 2017, signing on a one-month deal. He made his second debut for Maldon in their 1–0 defeat at Brightlingsea Regent on 4 February 2017, and scored his first goal in his second match during a 4–0 win over Thurrock on 11 February 2017. Akinwande scored four times in four appearances during the spell. He was loaned out for a third time during the campaign on 3 March 2017, joining National League South club East Thurrock United on a one-month loan. He scored four goals in six league appearances. Colchester opted against offering Akinwande a new contract and he was released in May 2017.

=== Return to Non-League ===
Following his release from Colchester, Akinwande signed for East Thurrock United on a permanent basis on 1 August 2017. After eight appearances and one goal for East Thurrock during the opening months of the 2017–18 season, Akinwande signed for fellow National League South club Concord Rangers on 7 October 2017. He made his debut for Concord on the same day as his signing was announced, coming on as a 75th-minute substitute in the club's 1–1 draw with Havant & Waterlooville. His first goals for Concord came against his former club, East Thurrock, as his two goals proved decisive in an eventual 3–2 away victory on 1 January 2018. He went on to score six times in 27 matches for Concord in all competitions during the campaign. Akinwande joined Haringey Borough of the Isthmian League Premier Division on 21 June 2018. He scored on his debut in a 2–2 draw with Bognor Regis Town on 11 August 2018. He scored eight league goals during the 2018–19 season as Haringey lost at the play-off semi-final stage having finished the season in third place.

Ahead of the 2019–20 season, Akinwande went on trial with National League South club Braintree Town. He was described a "prominent figure" throughout their pre-season campaign and subsequently signed for the club on 3 August 2019. He made his debut on the same day, playing the whole match in a 2–0 loss away to Bath City. Akinwande started the season by scoring four goals in the opening month. Having scored six times in 18 appearances for Braintree, he signed for divisional rivals Billericay Town on 22 November 2019. Akinwande made a goal-scoring debut in a 3–2 loss against Tonbridge Angels on 7 December 2019. He scored in his first three matches for his new club, making 16 appearances during his time at Billericay, scoring six goals.

=== Stevenage ===
Akinwande signed for League Two club Stevenage on 25 June 2020. Having made 11 appearances for Stevenage during the first half of the 2020–21 season, Akinwande joined National League South club Dartford on loan on 7 January 2021, with the agreement scheduled to run for the remainder of the campaign. After five appearances at Dartford, the National League South season was declared null and void on 24 February 2021, meaning Akinwande returned to Stevenage earlier than agreed.

On 15 May 2021 it was announced that he would leave Stevenage at the end of the season, following the expiry of his contract.

=== Return to Non-League ===
On 11 June 2021, Akinwande opted to return to National League South side, Braintree Town following his release from Stevenage.

On 10 December 2021, for the second time in his career, Akinwande signed for Billericay Town, after leaving Braintree Town.

On 26 June 2022, Akinwande signed for Tonbridge Angels after leaving Billericay Town.

On 3 September 2022, Akinwande signed for Carshalton Athletic after leaving Tonbridge Angels.

In June 2023, Akinwande joined Hastings United. Following an impressive start to the season in which he scored eight goals in fourteen appearances in all competitions, he joined Hornchurch in October 2023.

On 29 November 2024, he returned to Billericay Town for a third permanent spell.

In September 2025, Akinwande joined fellow Isthmian League Premier Division club Welling United. In March 2026, he joined SCEFL Division One club SE Dons.

== Style of play ==
Stevenage manager Alex Revell described Akinwande as possessing "pace, power and trickery", as well as praising the player's work ethic.

== Personal life ==
Akinwande is of Nigerian descent.

== Career statistics ==
As of match played 7 March 2026

Appearances and goals by club, season and competition
| Club | Season | League | | | FA Cup | | League Cup | | Other | | Total | |
| Club | Season | Division | Apps | Goals | Apps | Goals | Apps | Goals | Apps | Goals | Apps | Goals |
|---|---|---|---|---|---|---|---|---|---|---|---|---|
| Dartford | 2013–14 | Conference Premier | 1 | 0 | 1 | 0 | — | | 4 (Note: One appearance in FA Trophy) (Note: Three appearances in Kent Senior Cup) | 0 | 6 | 0 |
| Dartford | 2014–15 | Conference Premier | 0 | 0 | 0 | 0 | — | | 0 | 0 | 0 | 0 |
| Dartford | Total | | 1 | 0 | 1 | 0 | — | | 4 | 0 | 6 | 0 |
| Walton Casuals (loan) | 2014–15 | IL Division One South | 0 | 0 | 0 | 0 | — | | 0 | 0 | 0 | 0 |
| Fisher | 2014–15 | SCEFL | 12 | 4 | 0 | 0 | — | | 1 (Note: Appearance(s) in Southern Counties East Football League Challenge Cup) | 0 | 13 | 4 |
| Maldon & Tiptree | 2015–16 | IL Division One North | 15 | 11 | 1 | 0 | — | | 2 (Note: One appearance and one goal in FA Trophy, one appearance in Alan Turvey Trophy) | 1 | 18 | 12 |
| Colchester United | 2015–16 | League One | 2 | 0 | — | | — | | — | | 2 | 0 |
| Colchester United | 2016–17 | League Two | 1 | 0 | 0 | 0 | 0 | 0 | 0 | 0 | 1 | 0 |
| Colchester United | Total | | 3 | 0 | 0 | 0 | — | | 0 | 0 | 3 | 0 |
| Bishop's Stortford (loan) | 2016–17 | National League South | 7 | 3 | 0 | 0 | — | | 1 | 1 | 8 | 4 |
| Maldon & Tiptree (loan) | 2016–17 | IL Division One North | 4 | 4 | — | | — | | 0 | 0 | 4 | 4 |
| East Thurrock United (loan) | 2016–17 | National League South | 6 | 4 | — | | — | | — | | 6 | 4 |
| East Thurrock United | 2017–18 | National League South | 8 | 1 | 0 | 0 | — | | 0 | 0 | 8 | 1 |
| Concord Rangers | 2017–18 | National League South | 24 | 5 | 2 | 1 | — | | 1 | 0 | 27 | 6 |
| Haringey Borough | 2018–19 | IL Premier Division | 34 | 7 | 4 | 1 | — | | 2 | 0 | 40 | 8 |
| Braintree Town | 2019–20 | National League South | 18 | 6 | 1 | 0 | — | | 0 | 0 | 19 | 6 |
| Billericay Town | 2019–20 | National League South | 16 | 6 | — | | — | | 0 | 0 | 16 | 6 |
| Stevenage | 2020–21 | League Two | 7 | 0 | 0 | 0 | 1 | 0 | 3 (Note: Appearance(s) in EFL Trophy) | 0 | 11 | 0 |
| Dartford (loan) | 2020–21 | National League South | 5 | 0 | — | | — | | 0 | 0 | 5 | 0 |
| Braintree Town | 2021–22 | National League South | 14 | 1 | 1 | 1 | — | | 1 | 0 | 16 | 2 |
| Billericay Town | 2021–22 | National League South | 22 | 7 | — | | — | | — | | 22 | 7 |
| Tonbridge Angels | 2022–23 | National League South | 3 | 1 | 0 | 0 | — | | 0 | 0 | 3 | 1 |
| Carshalton Athletic | 2022–23 | IL Premier Division | 33 | 8 | 2 | 0 | — | | 2 | 1 | 37 | 9 |
| Hastings United | 2023–24 | IL Premier Division | 9 | 5 | 3 | 2 | — | | 1 | 0 | 13 | 7 |
| Hornchurch | 2023–24 | IL Premier Division | 27 | 18 | — | | — | | — | | 27 | 18 |
| Hornchurch | 2024–25 | National League South | 17 | 2 | 2 | 0 | — | | 0 | 0 | 19 | 2 |
| Hornchurch | Total | | 44 | 20 | 2 | 0 | 0 | 0 | 0 | 0 | 46 | 20 |
| Billericay Town | 2024–25 | IL Premier Division | 26 | 14 | — | | — | | 4 (Note: Three appearances in the Velocity Cup) (Note: One appearance and one goal in the Isthmian Premier League Play-Offs) | 1 | 30 | 15 |
| Billericay Town | 2025–26 | IL Premier Division | 8 | 2 | 2 | 0 | — | | 0 | 0 | 2 | |
| Billericay Town | Total | | 34 | 16 | 2 | 0 | 0 | 0 | 4 | 1 | 40 | 17 |
| Welling United | 2025–26 | IL Premier Division | 11 | 1 | 0 | 0 | — | | 1 (Note: Appearance(s) in Alan Turvey Trophy) | 0 | 12 | 1 |
| Potters Bar Town | 2025–26 | IL Premier Division | 12 | 0 | 0 | 0 | — | | 0 | 0 | 12 | 0 |
| Career total | | | 334 | 108 | 17 | 5 | 1 | 0 | 22 | 4 | 374 | 117 |

== Honours ==
Billericay Town

- Velocity Cup: 2024–25
