= Sammie Szmodics =

Irish footballer (born 1995)

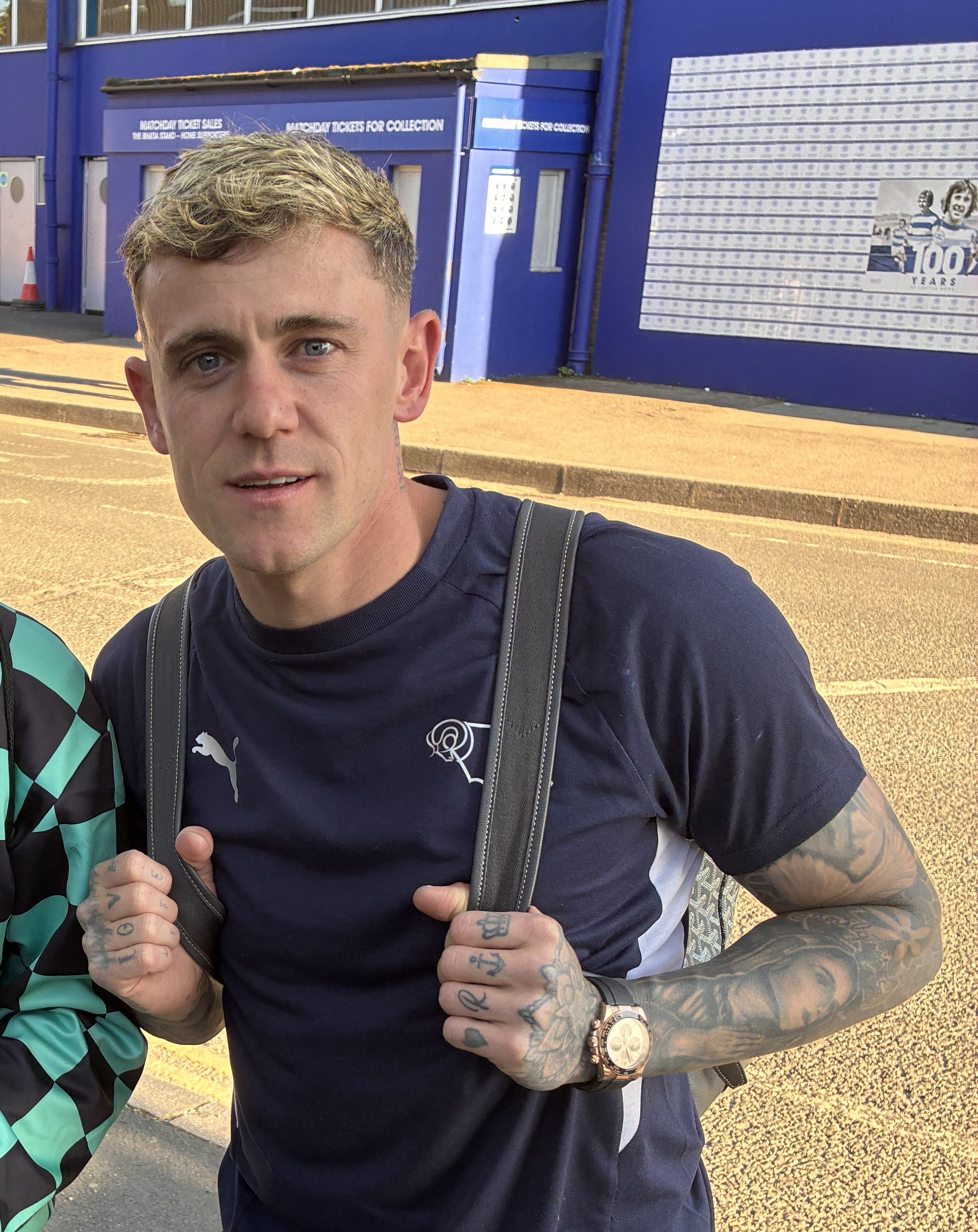
- Szmodics with Derby County in 2026

Personal information
- Full name: Samuel Joseph Szmodics
- Date of birth: 24 September 1995 (age 31)
- Place of birth: Colchester, England
- Height: 1.68 m (5 ft 6 in)
- Positions: Attacking midfielder; left midfielder; forward

Team information
- Current team: Derby County (on loan from Ipswich Town)
- Number: 11

Youth career
- 2002–2013: Colchester United

Senior career*
Years	Team	Apps	(Gls)
2013–2019	Colchester United	142	(35)
2015	→ Braintree Town (loan)	3	(2)
2019–2020	Bristol City	3	(0)
2020	→ Peterborough United (loan)	10	(4)
2020–2022	Peterborough United	79	(21)
2022–2024	Blackburn Rovers	79	(33)
2024–	Ipswich Town	36	(5)
2026	→ Derby County (loan)	13	(3)
2026–	→ Derby County (loan)	13	(3)

International career^{‡}
2024–	Republic of Ireland	12	(0)
- * Club domestic league appearances and goals as of 22:16, 6 November 2026 (UTC) ‡ National team caps and goals as of 22:30, 26 March 2026 (UTC)

Samuel Joseph Szmodics (/ˈsmɒdɪks/, born 24 September 1995) is a professional footballer who plays as a left midfielder or attacking midfielder for EFL Championship club Derby County, on loan from Premier League club Ipswich Town. Born in England, he plays for the Republic of Ireland national team.

An academy product of hometown club Colchester United, Szmodics made his professional debut in 2013, going on to score 38 goals in 162 appearances for the club before departing in 2019. After a brief spell at Bristol City, he spent two years at Peterborough United before joining Blackburn Rovers in 2022, where he became a key player, finishing as the top scorer in the 2023–24 EFL Championship. He left to join Premier League club Ipswich Town in August 2024, before joining Derby County on loan in February 2026, with a second loan spell at Derby County starting in August 2026.

Szmodics made his Republic of Ireland debut in a friendly against Belgium in March 2024.

== Club career ==
=== Colchester United ===
Szmodics is a product of the Colchester United Academy, having progressed through the club's youth ranks since the age of seven. He was a regular starter and scorer for the under-18 side, which included a goal in Colchester's 3–2 FA Youth Cup defeat by Chelsea on 1 December 2012, sweeping in Macauley Bonne's cross.

==== 2013–14 season ====
For Colchester United's 2013–14 pre-season campaign, Szmodics was drafted in to the first-team for their friendly fixtures. He was included in manager Joe Dunne's squad for a game at AFC Sudbury on 12 July 2013, and scored twice in two first-half minutes to hand Colchester a 2–0 lead in their eventual 5–0 win. Szmodics was then drafted into the first-team squad during the season while the club were suffering an injury crisis. He came on as a substitute for Craig Eastmond to make his professional debut on 28 September as Colchester drew 1–1 with Bristol City at Ashton Gate.

While appearing in the first-team, Szmodics continued to play for the under-18s. He helped his side to a FA Youth Cup first round 4–1 win over AFC Wimbledon on 12 November by scoring the opening goal, which also helped to extend their unbeaten run to 13 wins from 13 league and cup games.

Szmodics was shortlisted for the Football League Apprentice of the Year award in the League One category in January 2014, facing opposition from Preston North End's Josh Brownhill and Milton Keynes Dons' Brendan Galloway. He finished as runner-up to Galloway in the awards held in March 2014.

With the Colchester United under-18 side, Szmodics helped to earn the club a league title and cup winning double during the 2013–14 season. He scored a hat-trick in the Youth Alliance Cup final held against Bradford City at Valley Parade on 29 April in a 4–2 win for the U's.

Szmodics ended the campaign with seven League One substitute appearances and one FA Cup substitute appearances to his name.

==== 2014–15 season ====
Szmodics made his first appearance of the season as a second-half substitute for Freddie Sears in Colchester's 4–0 away defeat to Charlton Athletic in the League Cup on 12 August 2014. He made his first professional start for the club on 30 August, when Colchester were defeated 3–1 by Peterborough United at the Colchester Community Stadium. Szmodics was replaced by Dominic Vose after 57 minutes.

On 10 October 2014, Szmodics signed a three-and-a-half-year contract extension with Colchester until the summer of 2018. He scored his first professional goal for the club on 9 November. After coming on as an 81st-minute substitute for Alex Gilbey in the U's FA Cup first round tie against Gosport Borough, Szmodics scored Colchester's sixth goal in a 6–3 win. He scored his first league goal on Boxing Day 2014 in Colchester's 2–1 home defeat by Gillingham. Having been confined mostly to substitute appearances, manager Humes said that Szmodics had been "very close" to being a regular starter for the club over the Christmas period, and that the player was "very much in our thoughts, going forward". Szmodics then broke into the first-team with a string of starts, beginning with a goalless draw with Crawley Town on 28 December.

After breaking into the first-team and making 35 appearances across the season, as well as scoring five goals, Szmodics was named as Colchester United 'Young Player of the Year' in May 2015.

==== 2015–16 season: Loan to Braintree Town and return ====
After making six appearances in the first team in the early stages of the 2015–16 season, Szmodics was allowed to leave the club on loan to gain more first-team experience. He joined National League side Braintree Town on 30 October 2015 for an initial month-long loan. He made a goalscoring debut the following day as his 75th-minute goal earned Braintree a 1–0 win against Macclesfield Town at Cressing Road. Szmodics was recalled by his parent club on 27 November following manager Tony Humes' dismissal by Colchester on 26 November.

A foot injury kept Szmodics out of action for several months, wearing a protective boot and requiring injections to avoid an operation across Christmas and the New Year. He was ruled out for the rest of the season in March 2016 after undergoing surgery on his ankle. He had made eight appearances for Colchester in addition to his three for Braintree. Szmodics signed a three-year contract extension with the club on 21 June.

==== 2016–17 season ====
Szmodics scored his first goal of the 2016–17 season on 27 August 2016 in Colchester's 2–0 win at Adams Park against Wycombe Wanderers. His ankle injury resurfaced during the latter stages of 2016, and in January 2017 he was forced to undergo surgery on his troublesome ankle which physio Tony Flynn estimated would keep Szmodics out of action for approximately six weeks. He returned to action on 4 March 2017, replacing Sean Murray during Colchester's game against Cambridge United. Within eight minutes of being introduced, Szmodics scored an equaliser for Colchester to earn a 1–1 draw. Following a challenge on Crewe Alexandra striker Chris Dagnall during Colchester's 2–0 away defeat on 18 March, it was confirmed that Szmodics had broken his leg and would be ruled out for the remainder of the campaign, having scored five goals in 23 games for Colchester.

==== 2017–18 season ====
Szmodics came off the bench to score his first goal of the season and Colchester's only goal on 5 August in their season-opening 3–1 defeat at Accrington Stanley. After scoring five goals in five games throughout December, including a brace in a 3–1 win against Exeter City, Szmodics was nominated for the EFL League Two Player of the Month award. His performances during the first half of the season led to speculation that he was to sign for Premier League side AFC Bournemouth for a £1 million fee during the January transfer window. He was subsequently named League Two Player of the Month on 12 January.

==== 2018–19 season ====
Szmodics was again Colchester's top scorer for the second successive season with 15 goals, and with his contract set to expire at the end of the season, he was once again linked with a move away from the club.

=== Bristol City ===
On 28 June 2019, Szmodics ended his 16-year association with Colchester United, signing for Championship club Bristol City for an undisclosed fee on a three-year contract.

=== Peterborough United ===
After making just four appearances in five months at Bristol City, Szmodics signed for League One club Peterborough United on a six-month loan deal on 16 January 2020. He played his first game for Peterborough two days later, a 1–0 defeat at AFC Wimbledon. He went on to make a total of 10 appearances during his loan spell, scoring four goals – including a brace against Ipswich Town in a 4–1 win over their promotion rivals.

On 8 September 2020, Szmodics signed permanently for Peterborough. He signed a four-year contract after signing for an "undisclosed fee" believed to be in excess of £1m, with a number of other clubs rumoured to be interested, including Sunderland and Portsmouth. Szmodics scored 16 goals in all competitions for Peterborough in the 2020–21 season, helping the club win promotion back to the Championship.

=== Blackburn Rovers ===
Szmodics joined Blackburn Rovers on 1 August 2022, signing a three-year deal with an optional extra year, for an undisclosed fee. Peterborough had earlier rejected three bids from Blackburn, all in excess of £1m, before a fee was agreed. Blackburn manager Jon Dahl Tomasson said that Szmodics would be well-suited to the club's intense style of play. On 6 August 2022, Szmodics scored on his debut for Blackburn in a 3–0 away win against Swansea City.

Following a strong start to the 2023–24 season, Szmodics was awarded the EFL Championship Player of the Month for November 2023 having scored six goals in four matches. His form throughout the season earned him a place in the EFL Championship Team of the Season. He was also named as Blackburn's Supporters' and Players' Player of the Year at the end of the season. On the final matchday of the season, on 4 May, he scored a brace in a 2–0 away victory over champions Leicester City, securing Blackburn's continued presence in the Championship. He also managed to finish the season as the Championship's top scorer with 27 goals in 44 league appearances.

=== Ipswich Town ===
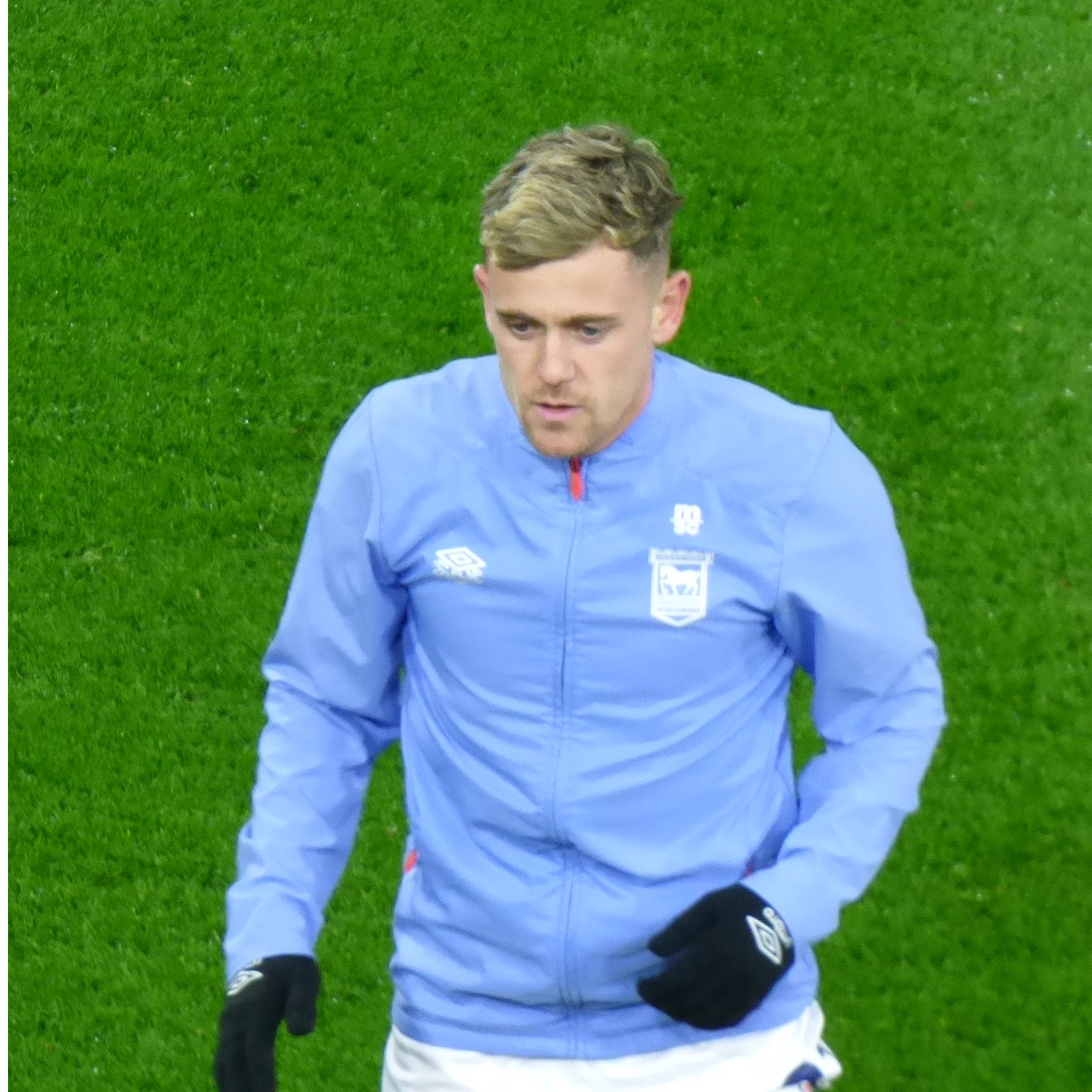
Szmodics with Ipswich Town in 2024.

On 16 August 2024, Szmodics joined newly promoted Premier League club Ipswich Town on a four-year contract for an undisclosed fee. He made his Ipswich and Premier League debut one day later, coming on as a second-half substitute in a 2–0 loss to Liverpool at Portman Road. On 24 August, he scored his first Premier League goal for Ipswich in a 4–1 away loss to Manchester City. Szmodics played 20 times for Ipswich in the top flight, scoring four times as the club got relegated at the end of the 2024–25 season. A regular in the first half the season, a persistent ankle injury would restrict his appearances after January.

The 2025–26 season would be a frustrating campaign for Szmodics at Ipswich as a recurrence of his ankle injury in October 2025 and the required surgery left him on the sidelines for two months. He also missed four games over the Christmas and New Year period with an illness. Szmodics played 18 times for Ipswich during the season, scoring once.

==== Derby County (loan) ====
On 2 February 2026, Derby announced they had signed Szmodics on a loan deal until the end of the 2025–26 season, reuniting with former boss John Eustace. He made his Derby County debut starting in a 2–0 Championship win against Swansea City at Pride Park on 14 February. Szmodics scored his first goal for Derby County in a 4–2 loss at Hull City on 24 February. Szmodics scored his 100th goal in English professional league football in Derby's 1–0 win over Portsmouth on 16 March. Szmodics scored three goals in 13 appearances during his loan period at Derby County.

On 1 August 2026, Szmodics rejoined Derby County on loan until the end of the 2026–27 season with an appearance-based obligation to buy the player for a reported fee of £2.7 million.

== International career ==
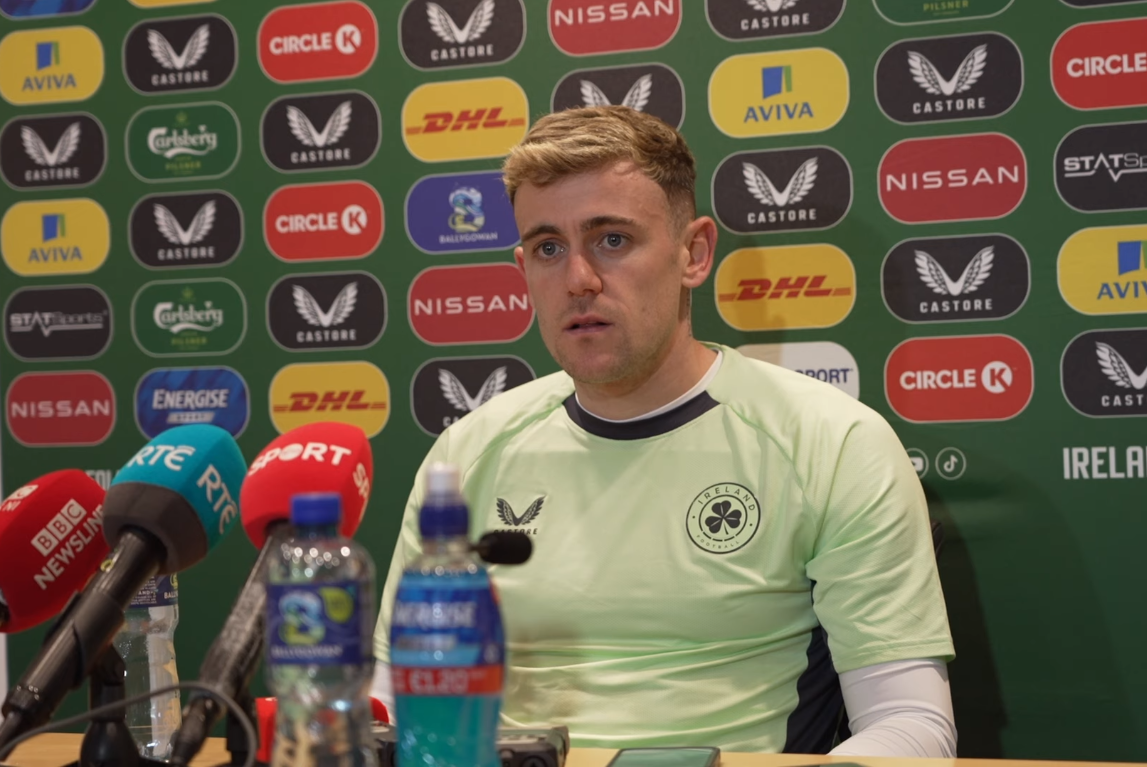
Szmodics with the Republic of Ireland in 2024.

As well as his country of birth, England, Szmodics was also eligible to represent the Republic of Ireland and Hungary through his Irish County Longford-born grandmother and Hungarian-born grandfather.

On 28 May 2021, Szmodics received his first call up to the Republic of Ireland team for the summer friendlies against Andorra and Hungary, following the withdrawal of Callum Robinson and Aaron Connolly from the initial squad through injury. On 2 June, however, Szmodics was ruled out of the squad after he aggravated an existing shoulder problem in training ahead of the Andorra game.

In October 2023, he was recalled for two UEFA Euro 2024 qualifying games against Greece and Gibraltar, but withdrew from the squad for personal reasons.

On 13 March 2024, Hungary manager Marco Rossi publicly criticised Szmodics for allegedly leaking information to the media about Rossi's contact to attempt to convince him to switch his international allegiance to Hungary ahead of their UEFA Euro 2024 campaign. Szmodics disputed Rossi's claims, stating: "I have never spoken to anyone from that country. I am fully focused on playing for Ireland." Szmodics made his debut for Ireland on 23 March in a 0–0 draw against Belgium at the Aviva Stadium.

== Career statistics ==
=== Club ===
As of match played 3 November 2026

Appearances and goals by club, season and competition
Club	Season	League			FA Cup		League Cup		Other		Total	
Club	Season	Division	Apps	Goals	Apps	Goals	Apps	Goals	Apps	Goals	Apps	Goals
Colchester United	2013–14	League One	7	0	1	0	0	0	0	0	8	0
Colchester United	2014–15	League One	31	4	2	1	1	0	1 (Note: Appearance in Football League Trophy)	0	35	5
Colchester United	2015–16	League One	5	0	1	0	1	0	1	0	8	0
Colchester United	2016–17	League Two	19	5	1	0	1	0	2 (Note: Appearances in EFL Trophy)	0	23	5
Colchester United	2017–18	League Two	37	12	0	0	1	0	2	1	40	13
Colchester United	2018–19	League Two	44	14	1	0	1	1	3	0	49	15
Colchester United	Total		142	35	6	1	5	1	9	1	163	38
Braintree Town (loan)	2015–16	National League	3	2	0	0	—		0	0	3	2
Bristol City	2019–20	Championship	3	0	0	0	1	0	—		4	0
Peterborough United (loan)	2019–20	League One	10	4	—		—		—		10	4
Peterborough United	2020–21	League One	42	15	1	0	—		3	1	46	16
Peterborough United	2021–22	Championship	36	6	3	1	0	0	—		39	7
Peterborough United	2022–23	League One	1	0	—		—		0	0	1	0
Peterborough United	Total		89	25	4	1	0	0	3	1	96	27
Blackburn Rovers	2022–23	Championship	34	5	4	2	3	0	—		41	7
Blackburn Rovers	2023–24	Championship	44	27	3	6	1	0	—		48	33
Blackburn Rovers	2024–25	Championship	1	1	—		1	2	—		2	3
Blackburn Rovers	Total		79	33	7	8	5	2	—		91	43
Ipswich Town	2024–25	Premier League	20	4	1	0	—		—		21	4
Ipswich Town	2025–26	Championship	16	1	1	0	1	0	—		18	1
Ipswich Town	2026–27	Premier League	0	0	—		—		—		0	0
Ipswich Town	Total		36	5	2	0	1	0	—		39	5
Derby County (loan)	2025–26	Championship	13	3	—		—		—		13	3
Derby County (loan)	2026–27	Championship	13	3	0	0	1	1	—		14	4
Derby County (loan)	Total		26	6	0	0	1	1	—		27	7
Career total			378	106	19	10	13	4	12	2	422	122

=== International ===
As of match played 26 March 2026

Appearances and goals by national team and year
National team	Year	Apps	Goals
Republic of Ireland
Republic of Ireland	2024	10	0
Republic of Ireland	2025	1	0
Republic of Ireland	2026	1	0
Total		12	0

== Honours ==
Ipswich Town

- EFL Championship runner-up: 2025–26

Colchester United U18

- Football League Youth Alliance South East: 2013–14
- Football League Youth Alliance Cup: 2013–14

Individual

- Colchester United Young Player of the Year: 2015
- EFL Championship Player of the Month: November 2023
- EFL Championship Team of the Season: 2023–24
- Blackburn Rovers Player of the Year: 2023–24
- EFL Championship Golden Boot: 2023–24
- PFA Team of the Year: 2023–24 Championship
- The Athletic Championship Team of the Season: 2023–24
