= 2009–10 Celtic F.C. season =

Celtic
2009–10 season
- Chairman: John Reid
- Manager: Tony Mowbray (until 25 March); Neil Lennon (Interim)
- Scottish Premier League: 2nd
- Scottish Cup: Semi-finals
- Scottish League Cup: Quarter-finals
- Champions League: Play-off round
- Europa League: Group stage
- Top goalscorer: League: Robbie Keane (12); All: Robbie Keane (16)
Home colours	Away colours	Third colours

The 2009–10 season was the 116th season of competitive football by Celtic.

Celtic started their 2009–10 campaign by playing in the pre-season Wembley Cup. Their first competitive game of the season was at Celtic Park on 29 July where they were beaten 1–0 by Dynamo Moscow in the 1st leg of the Champions League third-qualifying round for best placed teams. However, in the return leg at Dynamo Stadium on 5 August, Celtic won 2–0 (2–1 on aggregate) thanks to a 44th-minute goal by Scott McDonald and a late injury-time strike from Georgios Samaras, giving Celtic a first away win in Europe since their 1–0 win over MTK Hungaria at Stadium Puskás Ferenc in 2003. The win took Celtic through to the Champions League play-off round, where they lost to Arsenal.

Celtic kicked off their Scottish Premier League campaign with a 3–1 win over Aberdeen at Pittodrie Stadium. After 30 games of the season, Tony Mowbray was sacked following Celtic's 4–0 loss to St Mirren, with Celtic 10 points behind league leaders Rangers. Neil Lennon was then appointed caretaker manager until the end of the season; his first match in charge was a 3–1 victory over Kilmarnock on 27 March. Lennon won all the remaining league games, but was unable to prevent Rangers from winning the league title.

Celtic lost their Scottish Cup semi-final against Ross County 2–0. This was Lennon's only defeat during his tenure as interim manager. After the end of the season, Lennon succeeded Tony Mowbray as the next Celtic manager on a permanent basis.

== Results and fixtures ==
=== Scottish Premier League ===
15 August 2009 1	Aberdeen	1–3	Celtic	Pittodrie Stadium
	Aluko 61'	BBC Sport	McGeady 29', 42'; McDonald 44'	Attendance: 16,803; Referee: Craig Thomson

22 August 2009 2	Celtic	5–2	St Johnstone	Celtic Park
	Fortuné 21', 54'; Maloney 28', 53'; McDonald 74'	BBC Sport	Samuel 36'; Morris 76'	Attendance: 58,500; Referee: William Collum

30 August 2009 3	Hibernian	0–1	Celtic	Easter Road
		BBC Sport	Samaras 44'	Attendance: 14,221; Referee: Dougie McDonald

12 September 2009 4	Celtic	1–1	Dundee United	Celtic Park
	McDonald 11'	BBC Sport	Goodwillie 6'	Attendance: 58,500; Referee: Steve Conroy

20 September 2009 5	Celtic	2–1	Heart of Midlothian	Celtic Park
	Killen 56'; Loovens 90'	BBC Sport	Suso 5'	Attendance: 58,024; Referee: Dougie McDonald

26 September 2009 6	St Mirren	0–2	Celtic	St Mirren Park
		BBC Sport	McCourt 27'; Maloney 78'	Attendance: 6,164; Referee: Charlie Richmond

4 October 2009 7	Rangers	2–1	Celtic	Ibrox Stadium
	Miller 8', 16'	BBC Sport	McGeady 25' (pen.)	Attendance: 50,276; Referee: Craig Thomson

17 October 2009 8	Celtic	0–0	Motherwell	Celtic Park
		BBC Sport		Attendance: 58,000; Referee: Chris Boyle

25 October 2009 9	Hamilton Academical	1–2	Celtic	New Douglas Park
	Antoine-Curier 83'	BBC Sport	Maloney 15'; McDonald 29'	Attendance: 4,689; Referee: Iain Brines

31 October 2009 10	Celtic	3–0	Kilmarnock	Celtic Park
	McGeady 13'; Samaras 32'; McGinn 78'	BBC Sport		Attendance: 46,000; Referee: William Collum

8 November 2009 11	Falkirk	3–3	Celtic	Falkirk Stadium
	Arfield 61' (pen.); Moutinho 64'; Stewart 83'	BBC Sport	Caldwell 55'; McDonald 72', 79'	Attendance: 6,795; Referee: Brian Winter

22 November 2009 12	Dundee United	2–1	Celtic	Tannadice Park
	Daly 83'; Dods 90+1'	BBC Sport	Robson 72' (pen.)	Attendance: 11,098; Referee: Dougie McDonald

28 November 2009 13	Celtic	3–1	St Mirren	Celtic Park
	Innes 13' (o.g.); Samaras 42'; McDonald 61'	BBC Sport	Higdon 45'	Attendance: 41,000; Referee: Steve Conroy

5 December 2009 14	Celtic	3–0	Aberdeen	Celtic Park
	McDonald 39'; Samaras 52', 76'	BBC Sport		Attendance: 56,010; Referee: Mike Tumilty

12 December 2009 15	Motherwell	2–3	Celtic	Fir Park
	Jutkiewicz 26'; Reynolds 45+1'	BBC Sport	Samaras 14'; McGeady 52'; Fortuné 79'	Attendance: 7,807; Referee: Charlie Richmond

20 December 2009 16	Heart of Midlothian	2–1	Celtic	Tynecastle Stadium
	Stewart 32' (pen.); Bouzid 76'	BBC Sport	Samaras 21'	Attendance: 16,223; Referee: William Collum

26 December 2009 17	Celtic	2–0	Hamilton Academical	Celtic Park
	Loovens 13'; McGinn 90+1'	BBC Sport		Attendance: 36,827; Referee: Stevie O'Reilly

3 January 2010 18	Celtic	1–1	Rangers	Celtic Park
	McDonald 79'	BBC Sport	McCulloch 81'	Attendance: 58,300; Referee: Steve Conroy

16 January 2010 19	Celtic	1–1	Falkirk	Celtic Park
	Samaras 40'	BBC Sport	Finnigan 19'	Attendance: 50,000; Referee: Alan Muir

24 January 2010 20	St Johnstone	1–4	Celtic	McDiarmid Park
	Craig 12' (pen.)	BBC Sport	Fortuné 64', 81'; Samaras 77'; McCourt 86'	Attendance: 7,743; Referee: William Collum

27 January 2010 21	Celtic	1–2	Hibernian	Celtic Park
	Fortuné 5'	BBC Sport	Stokes 26'; Galbraith 90+2'	Attendance: 41,000; Referee: Iain Brines

30 January 2010 22	Hamilton Academical	0–1	Celtic	New Douglas Park
		BBC Sport	Rasmussen 67'	Attendance: 4,922; Referee: Calum Murray

2 February 2010 23	Kilmarnock	1–0	Celtic	Rugby Park
	Maguire 53'	BBC Sport		Attendance: 9,308; Referee: Mike Tumilty

10 February 2010 24	Celtic	2–0	Heart of Midlothian	Celtic Park
	Loovens 49'; Fortuné 50'	BBC Sport		Attendance: 44,500; Referee: Brian Winter

13 February 2010 25	Aberdeen	4–4	Celtic	Pittodrie Stadium
	Paton 9'; Mackie 37'; MacLean 75' (pen.), 88'	BBC Sport	Kamara 3'; Fortuné 36'; Keane 65'; McGeady 72'	Attendance: 14,898; Referee: Iain Brines

20 February 2010 26	Celtic	1–0	Dundee United	Celtic Park
	Keane 20'	BBC Sport		Attendance: 49,000; Referee: Craig Thomson

28 February 2010 27	Rangers	1–0	Celtic	Ibrox Stadium
	Edu 90+3'	BBC Sport		Attendance: 50,320; Referee: Dougie McDonald

7 March 2010 28	Falkirk	0–2	Celtic	Falkirk Stadium
		BBC Sport	Keane 34', 79'	Attendance: 6,792; Referee: Brian Winter

20 March 2010 29	Celtic	3–0	St Johnstone	Celtic Park
	Thompson 16'; Keane 67' (pen.); Samaras 87'	BBC Sport		Attendance: 30,000; Referee: Calum Murray

24 March 2010 30	St Mirren	4–0	Celtic	St Mirren Park
	Dorman 38', 84'; Thomson 58', 87'	BBC Sport		Attendance: 5,018; Referee: Charlie Richmond

27 March 2010 31	Celtic	3–1	Kilmarnock	Celtic Park
	Keane 37', 62'; Brown 66'	BBC Sport	Bryson 73'	Attendance: 41,000; Referee: Dougie McDonald

4 April 2010 32	Hibernian	0–1	Celtic	Easter Road
		BBC Sport	Keane 62' (pen.)	Attendance: 10,523; Referee: Charlie Richmond

13 April 2010 33	Celtic	2–1	Motherwell	Celtic Park
	Thompson 50', 78'	BBC Sport	Reynolds 49'	Attendance: 27,750; Referee: Iain Brines

17 April 2010 34	Celtic	3–2	Hibernian	Celtic Park
	Keane 4'; Fortuné 80'; Rasmussen 87'	BBC Sport	Riordan 6'; Stokes 54' (pen.)	Attendance: 29,650; Referee: Stephen Finnie

25 April 2010 35	Dundee United	0–2	Celtic	Tannadice Park
		BBC Sport	Kamara 30'; Keane 90+4' (pen.)	Attendance: 8,638; Referee: Iain Brines

1 May 2010 36	Celtic	4–0	Motherwell	Celtic Park
	McGeady 48'; O'Dea 78'; Forrest 87'; Keane 90+2'	BBC Sport		Attendance: 24,000; Referee: Alan Muir

4 May 2010 37	Celtic	2–1	Rangers	Celtic Park
	Naylor 8'; Fortuné 45'	BBC Sport	Miller 43'	Attendance: 58,000; Referee: Calum Murray

9 May 2010 38	Heart of Midlothian	1–2	Celtic	Tynecastle Stadium
	Žaliūkas 36'	BBC Sport	Keane 23'; Zheng 61'	Attendance: 14,389; Referee: Craig Thomson

=== Scottish Cup ===
19 January 2010 Fourth round	Greenock Morton	0–1	Celtic	Cappielow Park
		BBC Sport	McGinn 35'	Attendance: 10,191; Referee: Craig Thomson

7 February 2010 Fourth round	Dunfermline Athletic	2–4	Celtic	East End Park
	Graham 21'; Kirk 28' (pen.)	BBC Sport	Kamara 20'; Rasmussen 43'; Woods 59' (o.g.); Keane 68' (pen.)	Attendance: 8,933; Referee: Charlie Richmond

13 March 2010 Quarter-finals	Kilmarnock	0–3	Celtic	Rugby Park
		BBC Sport	Keane 64', 81', 82'	Attendance: 7,351; Referee: Iain Brines

10 April 2010 Semi-finals	Celtic	0–2	Ross County	Hampden Park
		BBC Sport	Craig 55'; Scott 88'	Attendance: 24,535; Referee: William Collum

=== Scottish League Cup ===
23 September 2009 Third round	Falkirk	0–4	Celtic	Falkirk Stadium
		BBC Sport	McDonald 28', 53'; McCourt 64'; Killen 73'	Attendance: 5,669; Referee: Mike Tumilty

28 October 2009 Quarter-final	Celtic	0–1	Heart of Midlothian	Celtic Park
		BBC Sport	Stewart 58' (pen.)	Attendance: 18,675; Referee: Craig Thomson

=== UEFA Champions League ===
==== Third qualifying round ====
29 July 2009 First leg	Celtic (Scotland)	0–1	(Russia) Dynamo Moscow	Celtic Park
		BBC Sport	Kokorin 7'	Attendance: 54,184; Referee: Nicola Rizzoli

5 August 2009 Second leg	Dynamo Moscow (Russia)	0–2 (1–2 agg.)	(Scotland) Celtic	Arena Khimki
		BBC Sport	McDonald 44'; Samaras 90+1'	Attendance: 13,753; Referee: Jonas Eriksson

==== Play-off round ====
18 August 2009 First leg	Celtic (Scotland)	0–2	(England) Arsenal	Celtic Park
		BBC Sport	Gallas 43'; Caldwell 71' (o.g.)	Attendance: 58,165; Referee: Massimo Busacca

26 August 2009 Second leg	Arsenal (England)	3–1 (5–1 agg.)	(Scotland) Celtic	Emirates Stadium
	Eduardo 28' (pen.); Eboué 53'; Arshavin 74'	BBC Sport	Donati 90+2'	Attendance: 59,962; Referee: Manuel Mejuto González

=== UEFA Europa League ===
==== Group stage ====
17 September 2009 1	Hapoel Tel Aviv (Israel)	2–1	(Scotland) Celtic	Bloomfield Stadium
	Vučićević 75'; Lala 88'	BBC Sport	Samaras 25'	Attendance: 11,000; Referee: Paul Allaerts

1 October 2009 2	Celtic (Scotland)	1–1	(Austria) SK Rapid Wien	Celtic Park
	McDonald 21'	BBC Sport	Jelavić 4'	Attendance: 42,013; Referee: Bruno Paixão

22 October 2009 3	Celtic (Scotland)	0–1	(Germany) Hamburg	Celtic Park
		BBC Sport	Berg 63'	Attendance: 38,821; Referee: Gianluca Rocchi

5 November 2009 4	Hamburg (Germany)	0–0	(Scotland) Celtic	HSH Nordbank Arena
		BBC Sport		Attendance: 45,037; Referee: Carlos Velasco Carballo

2 December 2009 5	Celtic (Scotland)	2–0	(Israel) Hapoel Tel Aviv	Celtic Park
	Samaras 22'; Robson 68'	BBC Sport		Attendance: 32,000; Referee: Tony Asumaa

17 December 2009 6	SK Rapid Wien (Austria)	3–3	(Scotland) Celtic	Ernst-Happel-Stadion
	Jelavić 1', 8'; Salihi 19'	BBC Sport	Fortuné 24', 67'; McGowan 90+1'	Attendance: 48,000; Referee: Robert Małek

== Player statistics ==
=== Appearances and goals ===
List of squad players, including number of appearances by competition

No.	Pos	Nat	Player	Total		Premier League		FA Cup		League Cup		Other	
No.	Pos	Nat	Player	Apps	Goals	Apps	Goals	Apps	Goals	Apps	Goals	Apps	Goals
1	GK	(Poland) POL	Artur Boruc	37	0	28	0	2	0	0	0	7	0
2	DF	(Germany) GER	Andreas Hinkel	41	0	30+1	0	3	0	1	0	6	0
3	DF	(England) ENG	Lee Naylor	19	1	11+1	1	2	0	0	0	2+3	0
4	DF	(Scotland) SCO	Stephen McManus	14	0	6+2	0	0	0	2	0	4	0
5	DF	(Scotland) SCO	Gary Caldwell	24	1	14	1	0	0	2	0	8	0
6	MF	(Cameroon) CMR	Landry N'Guémo	43	0	30	0	3	0	1	0	9	0
7	FW	(Australia) AUS	Scott McDonald	29	14	16+2	10	0	0	1+1	2	7+2	2
7	FW	(Republic of Ireland) IRL	Robbie Keane (from February)	19	16	15+1	12	2+1	4	0	0	0	0
8	MF	(Scotland) SCO	Scott Brown	29	1	19+2	1	3	0	0	0	5	0
9	FW	(Greece) GRE	Georgios Samaras	45	13	20+12	10	3+1	0	0+1	0	6+2	3
10	FW	(France) FRA	Marc-Antoine Fortuné	39	12	22+8	10	2+1	0	0	0	3+3	2
11	DF	(Scotland) SCO	Danny Fox	23	0	15	0	0	0	1	0	6+1	0
12	DF	(Scotland) SCO	Mark Wilson	15	0	8+2	0	0+1	0	1	0	3	0
13	FW	(Scotland) SCO	Shaun Maloney	16	4	8+1	4	0	0	1	0	6	0
14	MF	(Northern Ireland) NIR	Niall McGinn	24	3	6+11	2	1	1	0+1	0	1+4	0
15	FW	(Senegal) SEN	Diomansy Kamara	10	3	8+1	2	1	1	0	0	0	0
16	MF	(Republic of Ireland) IRL	Willo Flood	4	0	0+1	0	0	0	1	0	1+1	0
16	DF	(Netherlands) NED	Jos Hooiveld (from January)	2	0	2	0	0	0	0	0	0	0
17	MF	(Spain) ESP	Marc Crosas	26	0	14+3	0	3+1	0	2	0	3	0
18	MF	(Italy) ITA	Massimo Donati	5	1	2	0	0	0	0	0	3	1
18	MF	(South Korea) KOR	Ki Sung-Yueng (from January)	10	0	5+5	0	0	0	0	0	0	0
19	MF	(Scotland) SCO	Barry Robson	15	2	9+1	1	0	0	1	0	3+1	1
19	FW	(Denmark) DEN	Morten Rasmussen (from January)	13	3	2+8	2	2+1	1	0	0	0	0
20	MF	(Northern Ireland) NIR	Paddy McCourt	14	3	3+6	2	0+1	0	1+1	1	0+2	0
21	GK	(Scotland) SCO	Mark Brown	0	0	0	0	0	0	0	0	0	0
21	DF	(Netherlands) NED	Edson Braafheid (from January)	12	0	9+1	0	2	0	0	0	0	0
22	DF	(Netherlands) NED	Glenn Loovens	29	3	20	3	2	0	0	0	7	0
23	FW	(England) ENG	Ben Hutchinson	0	0	0	0	0	0	0	0	0	0
24	GK	(Poland) POL	Łukasz Załuska	17	0	10+1	0	2	0	2	0	2	0
25	DF	(Norway) NOR	Thomas Rogne	4	0	3+1	0	0	0	0	0	0	0
26	FW	(Republic of Ireland) IRL	Cillian Sheridan	0	0	0	0	0	0	0	0	0	0
27	MF	(China) CHN	Zheng Zhi	19	1	9+7	1	1+1	0	1	0	0	0
29	MF	(Japan) JPN	Koki Mizuno	2	0	0+1	0	0	0	0+1	0	0	0
30	MF	(Scotland) SCO	Paul Slane	0	0	0	0	0	0	0	0	0	0
33	FW	(New Zealand) NZL	Chris Killen	11	2	2+3	1	0	0	2	1	0+4	0
34	DF	(Northern Ireland) NIR	Daniel Lafferty	0	0	0	0	0	0	0	0	0	0
36	MF	(Republic of Ireland) IRL	Graham Carey	1	0	0	0	0	0	0	0	0+1	0
38	DF	(England) ENG	Josh Thompson	21	3	16+2	3	3	0	0	0	0	0
46	MF	(Republic of Ireland) IRL	Aiden McGeady	49	7	35	7	3+1	0	1+1	0	8	0
47	GK	(United States) USA	Dominic Cervi	0	0	0	0	0	0	0	0	0	0
48	DF	(Republic of Ireland) IRL	Darren O'Dea	23	1	16+3	1	3	0	0	0	0+1	0
49	MF	(Scotland) SCO	James Forrest	2	1	0+2	1	0	0	0	0	0	0
50	MF	(Italy) ITA	Luca Santonocito	0	0	0	0	0	0	0	0	0	0
51	MF	(Scotland) SCO	Nicky Riley	0	0	0	0	0	0	0	0	0	0
52	DF	(Scotland) SCO	Paul Caddis	13	0	3+7	0	1	0	1	0	1	0
54	MF	(Scotland) SCO	Ryan Conroy	0	0	0	0	0	0	0	0	0	0
55	MF	(Scotland) SCO	Paul McGowan	6	1	2+3	0	0	0	0	0	1	1

=== Top scorers ===
R	Player	Scottish Premier League	Scottish Cup	Scottish League Cup	Champions League (qualifying)	Europa League	Total
1	(Republic of Ireland) Robbie Keane	12	4	0	0	0	16
2	(Australia) Scott McDonald	10	0	2	1	1	14
3	(Greece) Georgios Samaras	10	0	0	1	2	13
4	(France) Marc-Antoine Fortuné	10	0	0	0	2	12
5	(Republic of Ireland) Aiden McGeady	7	0	0	0	0	7
6	(Scotland) Shaun Maloney	4	0	0	0	0	4
12	(Northern Ireland) Paddy McCourt	2	0	1	0	0	3
12	(Northern Ireland) Niall McGinn	2	1	0	0	0	3
12	(Netherlands) Glenn Loovens	3	0	0	0	0	3
12	(England) Josh Thompson	3	0	0	0	0	3
12	(Denmark) Morten Rasmussen	2	1	0	0	0	3
12	(Senegal) Diomansy Kamara	2	1	0	0	0	3
14	(New Zealand) Chris Killen	1	0	1	0	0	2
14	(Scotland) Barry Robson	1	0	0	0	1	2
22	(Italy) Massimo Donati	0	0	0	1	0	1
22	(Scotland) Gary Caldwell	1	0	0	0	0	1
22	(Scotland) Paul McGowan	0	0	0	0	1	1
22	(Scotland) Scott Brown	1	0	0	0	0	1
22	(Republic of Ireland) Darren O'Dea	1	0	0	0	0	1
22	(Scotland) James Forrest	1	0	0	0	0	1
22	(England) Lee Naylor	1	0	0	0	0	1
22	(China) Zheng Zhi	1	0	0	0	0	1

== Team statistics ==
=== League table ===
Pos	Team	Pld	W	D	L	GF	GA	GD	Pts	Qualification or relegation
1	Rangers (C)	38	26	9	3	82	28	+54	87	Qualification for the Champions League group stage
2	Celtic	38	25	6	7	75	39	+36	81	Qualification for the Champions League third qualifying round
3	Dundee United	38	17	12	9	55	47	+8	63	Qualification for the Europa League play-off round (Note: by winning the Scottish Cup.)
4	Hibernian	38	15	9	14	58	55	+3	54	Qualification for the Europa League third qualifying round
5	Motherwell	38	13	14	11	52	54	−2	53	Qualification for the Europa League second qualifying round

Source: SPFL Archive
Rules for classification: 1) points; 2) goal difference; 3) number of goals scored.
(C) Champions

=== Europa league table ===
Pos	Team	Pld	W	D	L	GF	GA	GD	Pts	Qualification	HTA	HSV	CEL	RAP
1	(Israel) Hapoel Tel Aviv	6	4	0	2	13	8	+5	12	Advance to knockout phase	—	1–0	2–1	5–1
2	(Germany) Hamburger SV	6	3	1	2	7	6	+1	10	Advance to knockout phase	4–2	—	0–0	2–0
3	(Scotland) Celtic	6	1	3	2	7	7	0	6		2–0	0–1	—	1–1
4	(Austria) Rapid Wien	6	1	2	3	8	14	−6	5		0–3	3–0	3–3	—

Source: Soccerway

== Transfers ==
=== In ===
Date	Player	From	Fee	Source
1 June 2009	(Poland) Łukasz Załuska	(Scotland) Dundee United	Free	
8 July 2009	(France) Marc-Antoine Fortuné	(France) AS Nancy	£3,800,000	
16 July 2009	(Cameroon) Landry N'Guémo	(France) AS Nancy	Loan	
24 July 2009	(Scotland) Danny Fox	(England) Coventry City	£1,500,000	
8 August 2009	(England) Josh Thompson	(England) Stockport County	£200,000	
15 August 2009	(Scotland) Greig Spence	(Scotland) Alloa Athletic	£100,000	
25 September 2009	(China) Zheng Zhi	(England) Charlton Athletic	Free	
1 January 2010	(South Korea) Ki Sung-Yueng	(South Korea) FC Seoul	£2,100,000	
11 January 2010	(Netherlands) Jos Hooiveld	(Sweden) AIK	£2,000,000	
20 January 2010	(Norway) Thomas Rogne	(Norway) Stabæk IF	Free	
26 January 2010	(Denmark) Morten Rasmussen	(Denmark) Brøndby	£1,300,000	
1 February 2010	(Senegal) Diomansy Kamara	(England) Fulham	Loan	
1 February 2010	(Scotland) Paul Slane	(Scotland) Motherwell	£400,000	
1 February 2010	(Netherlands) Edson Braafheid	(Germany) Bayern Munich	Loan	
1 February 2010	(Republic of Ireland) Robbie Keane	(England) Tottenham Hotspur	Loan	

=== Out ===
Date	Player	To	Fee	Source
1 July 2009	(Japan) Shunsuke Nakamura	(Spain) RCD Espanyol	Free	
2 July 2009	(Netherlands) Jan Vennegoor of Hesselink	(England) Hull City	Free	
2 July 2009	(Guinea) Bobo Baldé	(France) Valenciennes	Free	
25 June 2009	(Cameroon) Jean-Joël Perrier-Doumbé	(France) Toulouse	Free	
7 July 2009	(Scotland) Paul Hartley	(England) Bristol City	Free	
13 July 2009	(Scotland) Scott Cuthbert	(England) Swindon Town	£300,000	
13 August 2009	(Republic of Ireland) Cillian Sheridan	(England) Plymouth Argyle	Loan	
27 August 2009	(England) Ben Hutchinson	(England) Swindon Town	Loan	
27 August 2009	(Scotland) Simon Ferry	(England) Swindon Town	Loan	
30 August 2009	(Italy) Massimo Donati	(Italy) Bari	£1,300,000	
1 September 2009	(Republic of Ireland) Darren O'Dea	(England) Reading	Loan	
1 September 2009	(Scotland) Mark Brown	(Scotland) Kilmarnock	Loan	
13 November 2009	(Scotland) John Kennedy		Retired	
13 January 2010	(Scotland) Gary Caldwell	(England) Wigan Athletic	£1,800,000	
13 January 2010	(Scotland) Barry Robson	(England) Middlesbrough	£900,000	
13 January 2010	(Republic of Ireland) Willo Flood	(England) Middlesbrough	Free	
13 January 2010	(New Zealand) Chris Killen	(England) Middlesbrough	Free	
14 January 2010	(Scotland) Ryan Conroy	(Scotland) Partick Thistle	Loan	
14 January 2010	(Republic of Ireland) Cillian Sheridan	(Scotland) St Johnstone	Loan	
29 January 2010	(Scotland) Stephen McManus	(England) Middlesbrough	Loan	
29 January 2010	(Scotland) Danny Fox	(England) Burnley	£1,800,000	
29 January 2010	(Scotland) Scott Fox	(Scotland) Queen of the South	Loan	
30 January 2010	(Scotland) Mark Brown	(Scotland) Hibernian	Free	
1 February 2010	(Republic of Ireland) Graham Carey	(Scotland) St Mirren	Loan	
1 February 2010	(Australia) Scott McDonald	(England) Middlesbrough	£3,500,000	
1 February 2010	(England) Ben Hutchinson	(Scotland) Dundee	Loan	
18 February 2010	(Scotland) Nicky Riley	(Scotland) Hamilton Academical	Free	

== See also ==
- List of Celtic F.C. seasons
