= Josh Thompson (footballer) =

English footballer (born 1991)

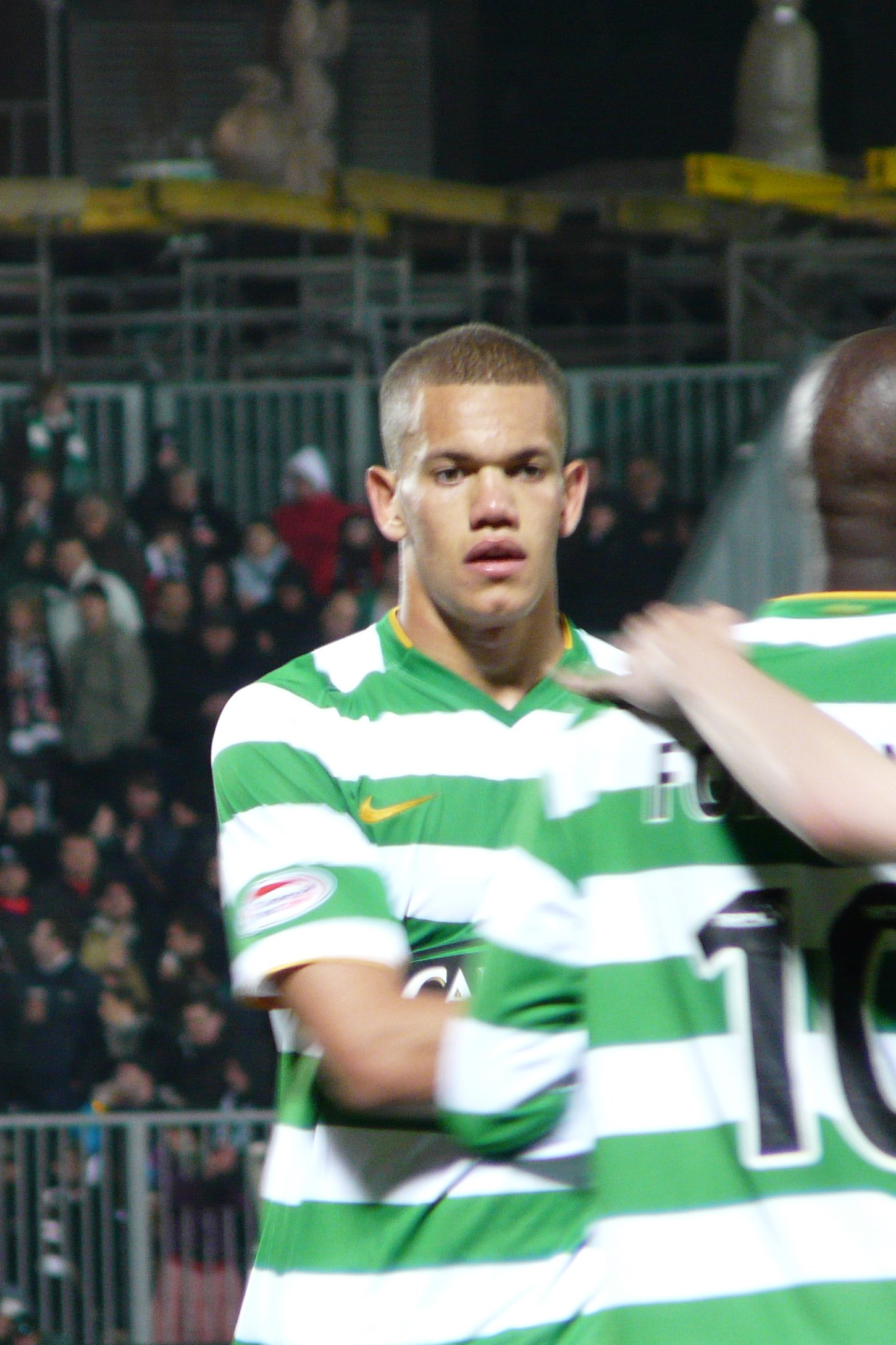
- Thompson playing for Celtic in 2010

Personal information
- Full name: Joshua William Thompson
- Date of birth: 25 February 1991 (age 35)
- Place of birth: Bolton, England
- Height: 1.91 m (6 ft 3 in)
- Position: Defender

Youth career
- Atherton Collieries
- –2008: Stockport County

Senior career*
Years	Team	Apps	(Gls)
2008–2009	Stockport County	9	(0)
2009–2012	Celtic	18	(3)
2010–2011	→ Rochdale (loan)	12	(1)
2011–2012	→ Peterborough United (loan)	0	(0)
2012	→ Chesterfield (loan)	20	(1)
2012	Portsmouth	2	(0)
2012	→ Colchester United (loan)	5	(0)
2013–2015	Colchester United	17	(1)
2014–2015	→ Tranmere Rovers (loan)	6	(0)
2015	Tranmere Rovers	9	(0)
2015–2017	Southport	56	(3)
2017	Macclesfield Town	0	(0)
2019–2020	Atherton Collieries		

International career
2010	England U19	5	(0)
- * Club domestic league appearances and goals

Joshua William Thompson (born 25 February 1991) is an English former footballer who played as a defender.

He began his career at Atherton Collieries before joining Stockport County and later moved to Celtic. He had loan spells at Rochdale, Peterborough United and Chesterfield, and then joined Portsmouth. He had a loan spell with Colchester United before signing permanently for Southport. He left Southport at the end of the 2016/17 season following their relegation from the National League. He signed for National League side Macclesfield Town in July 2017 and left in January 2018 without making an appearance. He has represented England at under-19 level.

== Club career ==
=== Stockport County ===
Born in Bolton, Greater Manchester, Thompson is a product of the Stockport County youth system where he arrived from Atherton Collieries. He made his first-team debut for County on 17 January 2009 as a late substitute, coming on as a late substitute for Dominic Blizzard in the 89th minute of a 3–1 win over Southend United. He made a further eight appearances for the club during the 2008–09 season, as his performances attracted attention from other clubs, including Manchester United and West Bromwich Albion, having had trials for both clubs. He was also sparking interest from Scottish Premier League giants Celtic while Championship club Peterborough United confirmed they had made a second offer for Thompson.

=== Celtic ===
Thompson signed for Celtic on 8 August 2009 for a £250,000 fee, teaming up with Celtic Tony Mowbray who had taken Thompson on trial while he was manager of West Brom. Thompson signed alongside fellow former Stockport youth team players Curtis Jones and Michael Ordish. He made his debut coming on as a substitute for Stephen McManus at Celtic Park in a 1–1 draw with Falkirk on 16 January 2010. He made his first Celtic start in a 4–1 away victory against St Johnstone on 20 March 2010 and scored his first goal for the club in a 3–0 victory over St Johnstone on 20 March 2010. Following the match and his first professional goal, Thompson said he wasn't expecting to score for the club so soon after joining. He followed his debut goal up with two in a 2–1 victory for Celtic against Motherwell on 13 April 2010. Despite limited first-team opportunities at Celtic, Thompson was named as the club's Young Player of the Year in his first season. Upon receiving the award, Thompson said that since joining Celtic, he had changed his attitude both on and off the pitch. He made 21 appearances in all competitions for Celtic during the 2009–10 season, and played his final game of the campaign in a 2–1 away victory over Hearts on 9 May 2010. This was to be his final game for the club.

==== Rochdale loan ====
In August 2010, Thompson left Celtic to join English League One side Rochdale on a season-long loan deal having fallen out of favour with new Celtic manager Neil Lennon. He made his debut on 26 August as a substitute for Marcus Holness in a 3–2 defeat to Birmingham City. He scored his only goal for the club in their 3–2 win against Walsall on 11 September. He found his first-team opportunities restricted with the Dale, and returned to Scotland at the end of his loan having recorded 12 League One and two cup appearances.

==== Peterborough United loan ====
Peterborough United manager Darren Ferguson captured Thompson on loan from Celtic for the duration of the 2011–12 season having made offers for the player prior to him joining Celtic in 2009. However, Thompson was allowed to leave London Road after he failed to break into the team.

==== Chesterfield loan ====
Chesterfield stepped in to take Thompson on loan until the end of the season in January 2012 following his disappointing stint with Peterborough United. He made his debut on 18 January in Chesterfield's 2–1 Football League Trophy triumph against Oldham Athletic. He scored for the club in only his second game, a goal which proved to be the winner as he headed past Colchester United goalkeeper Ben Williams in a 2–1 win on 21 January.

While playing for the club, Thompson played at Wembley Stadium in the 2012 Football League Trophy Final as Chesterfield came up against Swindon Town. The Spireites won the Trophy in their first visit to the national stadium with a 2–0 victory on 25 March 2012. Despite this success, Thompson also experienced relegation with the club as they fell short of League One safety by eight points. He made 23 appearances across all competitions for the club.

=== Portsmouth ===
Thompson signed for recently relegated League One club Portsmouth on 31 August 2012 on a short-term contract. He made his debut for the club in a 4–3 penalty shootout victory against Bournemouth on 4 September 2012 after a 2–2 in normal time. Thompson then made his second appearance and league debut for Pompey on 9 September in a 3–0 win at Crawley Town. However, after making just three first-team appearances, he suffered an ankle injury in training that kept him out of action for six weeks.

==== Colchester United loan ====
Following manager Michael Appleton's departure and Guy Whittingham's arrival at Fratton Park, Thompson was allowed to leave on loan for fellow League One club Colchester United on a one-month loan in November 2012. He made his debut for the U's in a 2–0 win against Bury on 17 November, coming on as a 90th-minute substitute.

While on loan with Colchester, Portsmouth manager Guy Whittingham initially stated that Thompson still had a future with the club. Despite this reassurance, just one month later Thompson was told by Whittingham that he didn't think the player had a future with Portsmouth. Uncertainty over his future aside, Thompson made five loan appearances for Colchester, although he was sent off in the final game of his loan spell during a 3–1 home defeat by Brentford on 26 December.

=== Colchester United ===
Thompson agreed to join Colchester on an 18-month contract from 1 January 2013 following the expiration of his short-term contract with Portsmouth. He made his second debut for the club in their 1–0 away defeat to Doncaster Rovers on 5 January 2013 in a game where Thompson had a goal disallowed following an infringement that was spotted by the referee. He then went on to score his first goal for the U's on 16 March 2013 with an equalising header from a Billy Clifford cross against Bury, a game which Colchester went on to win 2–1 over their relegation battle rivals. Thompson made 17 appearances for United during the second half of the 2012–13 season.

Following a pre-season schedule blighted by injury, hampering his start to the 2013–14 season, Thompson suffered another injury setback having made just one Football League Trophy appearance during the season. The ankle injury he sustained required an operation, leaving him sidelined for three months. In February 2014, Thompson suffered further injury complications, and with just 25 minutes of football under his belt in the 2013–14 season meant that Thompson would be out of action until the end of the season. After proving his fitness to manager Joe Dunne, Thompson signed a new one-year contract with Colchester on 3 July 2014. However, in the first week of the season during the pre-match warmup for a League Cup tie with Charlton Athletic, Thompson damaged his hamstring muscle, ruling him out of action once again.

==== Tranmere Rovers loan ====
Having not played at all for Colchester in the 2014–15 season, and having only experienced 25 minutes of first-team football since his last league outing on 6 April 2013, Thompson was sent out on loan to the Football League's basement club Tranmere Rovers on 24 October in a bid for match fitness. His signed a loan deal to keep him with the club until January 2015. He made his debut for the club on 8 November, marking his first competitive game for 14 months. He started in Tranmere's 1–0 FA Cup first round victory over Bristol Rovers. In only his third game for Tranmere, Thompson picked up a hamstring injury in their 1–0 defeat to Luton Town on 15 November. He returned to action in Tranmere's 2–0 Boxing Day defeat to Burton Albion.

Thompson extended his loan with the club on 6 January 2015, with the loan set to expire on 24 January.

=== Tranmere Rovers ===
Following the expiry of his loan from Colchester United, Thompson had his contract cancelled by mutual consent on 28 January and subsequently agreed to a six-month contract with Tranmere Rovers. At the end of the season, that saw Tranmere Rovers relegate out of League Two, Thompson was released by the club.

=== Southport ===
Following Thompson's release from Tranmere, he signed for National League side Southport on 31 July 2015 after successful trial. In January 2017, Thompson suffered a career threatening knee injury.

=== Macclesfield Town ===
After leaving Southport following their relegation from the National League, Thompson joined Macclesfield Town in July 2017.

=== Atherton Collieries ===
In September 2019 Atherton Collieries confirmed, that Thompson had returned to the club that he had played for as a youth player.

After retiring from football, Thompson joined Salford Red Devils as first team assistant physiotherapist until October 2022 when Thompson moved to Blackburn Rovers to join their medical department.

== International career ==
In July 2010, Thompson appeared for England under-19s in the 2010 UEFA European Under-19 Championship in France, making three appearances in the finals before his team lost 3–1 to Spain in the semi-final stage.

== Career statistics ==
As of match played 3 May 2015.

Club statistics
Club	Season	League			FA Cup		League Cup		Other		Total	
Club	Season	Division	Apps	Goals	Apps	Goals	Apps	Goals	Apps	Goals	Apps	Goals
Stockport County	2008–09	League One	9	0	—		—		—		9	0
Celtic	2009–10	Scottish; Premier; League	18	3	3	0	—		—		21	3
Celtic	2010–11	Scottish; Premier; League	—		—		—		—		—	
Celtic	2011–12	Scottish; Premier; League	—		—		—		—		—	
Celtic	Total		18	3	3	0	0	0	0	0	21	3
Rochdale (loan)	2010–11	League One	12	1	—		1	0	1 (Note: Appearance(s) in Football League Trophy)	0	14	1
Peterborough United (loan)	2011–12	Championship	—		—		—		—		—	
Chesterfield (loan)	2011–12	League One	20	1	—		—		3	0	23	1
Portsmouth	2012–13	League One	2 (Note: Soccerbase does not register an appearance made by Josh Thompson during a match against Crawley Town on 9 September 2012)	0	—		—		1	0	3	0
Colchester United	2012–13	League One	22	1 (Note: Soccerbase does not register a goal scored by Josh Thompson during a match against Bury on 16 March 2013)	—		—		—		22 (Note: Including loan spell)	1
Colchester United	2013–14	League One	—		—		—		1	0	1	0
Colchester United	2014–15	League One	—		—		—		—		—	
Colchester United	Total		22	1	0	0	0	0	1	0	23	1
Tranmere Rovers	2014–15	League Two	15	0	2	0	—		1	0	18	0
Southport	2015–16	National League	0	0	0	0	0	0	0	0	0	0
Career total			98	6	5	0	1	0	7	0	111	6

== Honours ==
Chesterfield

- Football League Trophy: 2011–12
