= 2012–13 Colchester United F.C. season =

Colchester United
2012–13 season
- Owner: Robbie Cowling
- Chairman: Robbie Cowling
- Manager: John Ward (until 24 September); Joe Dunne (from 27 September)
- Stadium: Colchester Community Stadium
- League One: 20th
- FA Cup: 1st round (eliminated by Chelmsford City)
- League Cup: 1st round (eliminated by Yeovil Town)
- Football League Trophy: 2nd round (southern section) (eliminated by Northampton Town)
- Top goalscorer: League: Jabo Ibehre (8); All: Jabo Ibehre; Freddie Sears (8)
- Highest home attendance: 5,862 v Shrewsbury Town, 20 April 2013
- Lowest home attendance: 2,367 v Yeovil Town, 26 February 2013
- Average home league attendance: 3,530
- Biggest win: 2–0 v Carlisle United, 20 October 2012 v Leyton Orient, 23 October 2012 v Bury, 17 November 2012 v Walsall, 26 January 2013 v Yeovil Town, 26 February 2013 v Stevenage, 2 March 2013 v Carlisle United, 27 April 2013; 3–1 v Hartlepool United, 29 September 2012
- Biggest defeat: 0–4 v Tranmere Rovers, 1 September 2012; 1–5 v Milton Keynes Dons, 24 November 2012 v Tranmere Rovers, 23 February 2013
Home colours	Away colours

The 2012–13 season was Colchester United's 71st season in their history and fifth successive season in the third tier of English football, League One. Alongside competing in the League One, the club also participated in the FA Cup, the League Cup and the Football League Trophy.

The 2012–13 season marked the club's 75th anniversary, but the club's on-field performance was poor, suffering 23 league defeats while achieving a club-record nine consecutive defeats. John Ward was relieved of his duties with the club in the relegation zone but his replacement, former U's defender Joe Dunne, turned around United's fortunes, leading them to mid-table by November. However, the club then embarked on their record run of nine successive defeats, which spanned from mid-November to mid-January. At the end of this run, the club dropped into the relegation zone, before escaping and then returning to the drop zone in early February. They flirted with relegation for the remainder of the season until they secured safety on the final day of the season with a 2–0 win at Carlisle United, finishing in 20th place.

Colchester exited each cup competition after just one game, suffering defeats at Yeovil Town and Northampton Town in the League Cup and League Trophy respectively, while they were humiliated in the FA Cup first round by non-League Essex rivals Chelmsford City by a 3–1 margin.

== Season overview ==
For the 2012–13 season, the U's marked their 75th anniversary with a special home kit which was designed with the usual blue and white stripes, but did not have a main sponsorship logo. The club hoped to promote local businesses on a game-by-game basis in order to reflect on the club's early days without a sponsor.

In pre-season, Colchester started with a comfortable 6–0 win over Heybridge Swifts. Ian Henderson and Freddie Sears both scored a brace in a one-sided first half. Academy product Tosin Olufemi also scored twice in the second half to secure a convincing win for the U's. The club then embarked on a pre-season training camp in the Netherlands. Colchester took on a youthful Vitesse side and won 3–2, with goals from Freddie Ladapo, Marcus Bean and Freddie Sears. The game also saw the return of Magnus Okuonghae who had re-signed for the club after briefly leaving the club following the expiry of his contract.

A crowd just shy of 8,000 at the Colchester Community Stadium saw recently promoted Premier League side West Ham United beat Colchester 2–1 with Anthony Wordsworth scoring the goal for the home side. An experimental U's side then lost 4–1 at Witham Town, with then-triallist Jackson Ramm scoring Colchester's consolation goal. They responded by beating Maldon & Tiptree 2–1 courtesy of Freddie Sears fourth goal of pre-season and another from Drey Wright. The following day, Colchester won 2–1 at Brentwood Town with goals from John-Joe O'Toole and Freddie Ladapo.

Colchester hosted Championship side Derby County on 3 August. Freddie Sears scored a brace, but drew 2–2 after an unfortunate Magnus Okuonghae own goal and Theo Robinson's equaliser came as the final kick of the game. They then hosted Ipswich Town, who won 2–1 after two first-half goals from Michael Chopra, but Clinton Morrison's first goal for the club reduced the deficit in the second-half. Colchester then rounded off their pre-season with a 1–0 win at Conference North side Bishop's Stortford with Drey Wright's solo-effort the difference between the two sides.

=== August ===
Colchester's season started in the League Cup first round at Yeovil Town, where Academy product Drey Wright started to make his professional debut. Also making his club debut was forward Clinton Morrison. The U's were soundly beaten 3–0 on the night.

Colchester's league campaign kicked off on 18 August with a 0–0 draw at Preston North End, with Mark Cousins producing a string of saves in the U's goal to preserve an opening day point. Colchester then held Portsmouth to a 2–2 draw at the Community Stadium, with a first U's goal for Michael Rose and Magnus Okuonghae scoring the other. Jordan Obita struck late on to earn a point for the away team.

Former Sheffield Wednesday striker Clinton Morrison scored an equaliser, his first goal for the club, in a 1–1 draw against Sheffield United with what was the U's first shot on target, in the 73rd-minute, to secure a third successive draw for Colchester.

=== September ===
Colchester slumped to their first league defeat of the season on 1 September after they were beaten 4–0 at Tranmere Rovers following a Jake Cassidy hat-trick. A 1–0 defeat at Brentford consigned the U's to their worst league start since 1996, conceding an 88th-minute goal.

On 15 September, Colchester found themselves bottom of the League One table after six games and no wins following a 2–1 home defeat by Doncaster Rovers. Their stay at the bottom of the league was brief however, when Anthony Wordsworth's late penalty kick earned them a point during their 1–1 home draw with Crawley Town.

On 22 September, the U's cemented their worst-ever start to a league season with a 1–0 defeat at Scunthorpe United. This result proved the final straw for chairman Robbie Cowling as John Ward was sacked as Colchester manager, leaving the club after two years in charge with the U's without a win in League One and 22nd in the table. Assistant manager Joe Dunne was appointed caretaker manager.

On 27 September, Dunne was appointed full-time manager of Colchester United. He assigned Mark Kinsella as his assistant. Two days later, Dunne took charge of his first match and promptly led the team to their first win of the campaign, a 3–1 home victory over Hartlepool United with two debut goals for loan-signing Jabo Ibehre and an earlier equalising goal from Gavin Massey.

=== October ===
On 2 October, Colchester earned their first away win of the season at Swindon Town. They won 1–0 courtesy of a Michael Rose free kick against his former club. Colchester were again defeated by Yeovil on 6 October, on this occasion 3–1, with Jabo Ibehre scoring Colchester's only goal. This was Dunne's first defeat as Colchester manager.

Having received a bye in the first round of the Football League Trophy, the U's faced former manager Aidy Boothroyd's Northampton Town in the second round of the competition on 9 October. With the U's leading 1–0 at half-time through a Freddie Sears goal, young debutant Alex Gilbey gave away a penalty from which Northampton scored, before conceding a second goal two minutes later to hand the Cobblers a 2–1 victory.

Loanee Sanchez Watt ended Stevenage's unbeaten start to the season on 13 October with his first goal of the season in a 1–0 home victory for Colchester. Colchester then made it four league wins in five games under Joe Dunne on 20 October with a 2–0 home victory over Carlisle United. Loanees Craig Eastmond and Jabo Ibehre scored the goals. The U's then secured their fifth win in six league games on 23 October with a 2–0 win at Leyton Orient, with goals from Anthony Wordsworth and Ian Henderson.

On 27 October, Colchester allowed a 2–0 lead to slip to draw 2–2 away at Shrewsbury Town with both goals coming from Arsenal loanees Eastmond and Watt.

=== November ===
Colchester started the month with an FA Cup tie at Essex neighbours Chelmsford City in the first round. It was the first competitive encounter between the sides for 44 years, the last being an FA Cup second round tie in January 1968. Chelmsford won on this occasion, knocking out their Football League opponents 3–1. Donovan Simmonds scored twice, before Michael Rose's free kick reduced the deficit, but Jamie Slabber's effort late on sealed the win for the Conference South side.

On 6 November, Colchester were defeated 2–0 at home by Notts County. The U's then suffered their third defeat in as many games with a 3–2 defeat at Crewe Alexandra, having led 2–0 at half-time following goals from Freddie Sears and Ian Henderson. The team responded to this defeat with a 2–0 victory over Bury, Wordsworth and Sears scoring the goals in the second-half. The U's then lost 3–1 at home to Coventry City on 20 November, with Tom Eastman registering the only goal for the home side. Colchester were beaten 5–1 by Milton Keynes Dons on 24 November. Ian Henderson scored Colchester's consolation and later Gavin Massey was sent off for a tackle on Adam Chicksen.

=== December ===
Owing to an early FA Cup exit, Colchester had a two-week break heading into their 8 December home league match against Oldham Athletic. However, the U's fell to their fifth defeat in six games as the visitors prospered 2–0, with Brian Wilson scoring an unfortunate own goal. Colchester continued their losing streak when a 1–0 defeat at AFC Bournemouth left them just two points above the relegation zone. They followed this up with a fifth consecutive away league defeat on 22 December with another 1–0 defeat, this time at Walsall, earning the hosts their first victory in 17 games. A further defeat followed at home to high-flying Brentford on Boxing Day, but despite the reverse, a youthful U's side put in a promising display and featured a first professional goal from Drey Wright on his first league start for the club.

=== January ===
Colchester's New Year's Day game was a trip to Crawley, where they continued their losing run with a miserable 3–0 defeat, Crawley's first home win in nine weeks. On 5 January, Colchester equalled their longest-ever losing run with a 1–0 defeat at Doncaster in a game in which Josh Thompson had a goal ruled out for an infringement by another player.

On 12 January, Colchester set the unwanted club record of nine consecutive defeats as fellow strugglers Scunthorpe United won 2–1at the Community Stadium. The result left the U's in the relegation zone and manager Joe Dunne considering his position.

Colchester's trip to Hartlepool on 19 January was postponed due to heavy snow, with their next fixture on 26 January at home to Walsall. Colchester ended their losing streak with a solid 2–0 victory, with goals from Jabo Ibehre, making his second debut for the club, and Freddie Sears. Before January was out, the club sold youth-team product Anthony Wordsworth to neighbours Ipswich Town for a £100,000 transfer fee, potentially rising to £200,000.

=== February ===
The U's began February with a 3–2 win against Portsmouth with a brace from Gavin Massey and a Freddie Sears penalty earning Colchester a first away victory since October. They then slipped to within two points of the relegation zone after a 1–0 home defeat by Swindon Town on 5 February.

Colchester made it three wins in four games with victory over Preston on 9 February as Freddie Sears scored the only goal of the game. A heavy 3–0 defeat by Sheffield United on 16 February left the U's in 20th position, one spot outside of the relegation zone. They were then soundly beaten 5–1 at home by Tranmere Rovers as Colchester dropped into the relegation places. Magnus Okuonghae scored the consolation for Colchester as the U's found themselves three points adrift from safety albeit with a game in hand over 20th-placed Scunthorpe. A win against high-fliers Yeovil on 26 February rounded out the month as the U's made amends for League Cup and earlier league defeats against the Glovers. Billy Clifford scored his first professional goal and Freddie Sears added a second in the 2–0 victory.

=== March ===
On 2 March, Colchester won 2–0 at Stevenage with both goals coming from Jabo Ibehre. The result lifted the U's out of the relegation places. Ten-man Colchester then battled to a 0–0 draw at relegation-threatened rivals Hartlepool after Jabo Ibehre was sent off. A 2–1 defeat followed at Crewe on 9 March, George Porter scoring the leveller before Mathias Pogba's winner. The U's let a two-goal lead slip to draw 2–2 at Coventry on 12 March having taken the lead through Gavin Massey and loanee Michael Smith doubling the lead after half-time. An injury time equaliser denied the U's all three points.

Colchester began their game at Bury with George Porter dismissed for violent conduct after only four minutes. They then fell behind after a goal from former United player Craig Fagan. However, Colchester levelled first through Josh Thompson, and the took the lead a minute later through Clinton Morrison. The win moved the U's seven points clear of the relegation zone. On Good Friday, Colchester lost 1–0 to Bournemouth at the Community Stadium, once again leaving the club within three points of the relegation positions with six games to play.

=== April ===
A relegation battle with Oldham Athletic ended 1–1 on 1 April, with Drey Wright scoring Colchester's goal before an Oldham equaliser mid-way through the second-half. An important win over Leyton Orient on 6 April followed, moving Colchester six points above the relegation zone as rivals Oldham and Scunthorpe failed to win. Goals came courtesy of Gavin Massey and Drey Wright. Former U's player Kevin Lisbie scored Orient's goal and had a penalty saved by Sam Walker with twelve minutes remaining.

Jabo Ibehre scored Colchester's goal in a 3–1 defeat at Notts County on 13 April, and then a second successive defeat at home by Milton Keynes Dons threatened to reduced the points advantage over Scunthorpe in their relegation scrap, but with Scunthorpe losing to already-relegated Bury, the U's maintained a five-point advantage and thus requiring a win from their next two games to guarantee safety. A lacklustre 0–0 draw with Shrewsbury in the final home game of the season, coupled with a win for Scunthorpe over MK Dons meant the relegation battle moved on to the final day of the season with each team separated by three points. Anything but a win for Scunthorpe against Swindon would mean relegation, while Colchester required at least a draw for survival.

With the future of the club to be decided on the final day of the season, it was imperative that Colchester earned at least a point from their away game at Carlisle on 27 April to guarantee League One football for another season. Goals from Gavin Massey and Tom Eastman ensured this in a 2–0 victory, while Scunthorpe were relegated despite winning at Swindon.

== Players ==
As of match played 27 April 2013.

No.	Name	Position	Nationality	Place of birth	Date of birth	Apps	Goals	Signed from	Date signed	Fee
Goalkeepers
1	Mark Cousins	GK	(England)	Chelmsford	9 January 1987 (aged 25)	44	0	Youth team	1 August 2004	Free transfer
29	Shaun Phillips	GK	(England)	Colchester	7 March 1994 (aged 18)	0	0	Academy	1 July 2012	Free transfer
Defenders
2	David Wright	FB/DM	(England)	Warrington	1 May 1980 (aged 32)	0	0	(England) Crystal Palace	25 January 2013	Free transfer
4	Magnus Okuonghae	CB	(England)	(Nigeria) Lagos	16 February 1986 (aged 26)	111	2	(England) Dagenham & Redbridge	1 July 2009	£60,000
6	Matt Heath	CB	(England)	Leicester	1 November 1981 (aged 30)	105	5	(England) Leeds United	13 May 2008	Free transfer
18	Tom Eastman	CB	(England)	Colchester	21 October 1991 (aged 20)	27	3	(England) Ipswich Town	1 July 2011	Free transfer
20	Brian Wilson	FB	(England)	Manchester	9 May 1983 (aged 29)	80	2	(England) Bristol City	29 June 2010	Free transfer
23	Jackson Ramm	FB	(England)	Cambridge	31 May 1993 (aged 19)	0	0	(England) Blackburn Rovers	30 July 2012	Free transfer
25	John White	FB	(England)	Colchester	26 July 1986 (aged 25)	231	0	Youth team	1 July 2003	Free transfer
31	Bradley Hamilton	DF	(England)	Newham	30 August 1992 (aged 19)	1	0	Youth team	1 July 2009	Free transfer
40	Josh Thompson	CB	(England)	Bolton	25 February 1991 (aged 21)	5	0	(England) Portsmouth	1 January 2013	Free transfer
Midfielders
7	Karl Duguid	MF	(England)	Letchworth	21 March 1978 (aged 34)	463	48	(England) Plymouth Argyle	20 July 2011	Free transfer
8	John-Joe O'Toole	MF	(Republic of Ireland)	(England) Harrow	30 September 1988 (aged 23)	60	3	(England) Watford	1 January 2010	Undisclosed
10	Kemal Izzet	MF	(England)	Whitechapel	29 September 1980 (aged 31)	461	21	(England) Charlton Athletic	13 April 2001	Free transfer
14	Andy Bond	MF	(England)	Wigan	16 March 1986 (aged 26)	89	12	(England) Barrow	29 June 2010	Free transfer
15	Marcus Bean	MF	(Jamaica)	(England) Hammersmith	2 November 1984 (aged 27)	0	0	(England) Brentford	8 June 2012	Free transfer
26	Ryan Melaugh	MF	(England)	Harlow	28 August 1994 (aged 17)	0	0	Academy	1 July 2012	Free transfer
28	Alex Gilbey	MF	(England)	Dagenham	9 December 1994 (aged 17)	0	0	Youth team	4 July 2011	Free transfer
30	Drey Wright	MF	(England)	Greenwich	30 April 1995 (aged 17)	0	0	Youth team	4 July 2011	Free transfer
32	Jordan Sanderson	MF	(England)	Chingford	7 August 1993 (aged 18)	1	0	Youth team	1 January 2011	Free transfer
43	Tom Lapslie	MF	(England)	Waltham Forest	5 May 1995 (aged 17)	0	0	Academy	2 July 2012	Free transfer
Forwards
9	Clinton Morrison	FW	(Republic of Ireland)	(England) Tooting	14 May 1979 (aged 33)	0	0	(England) Sheffield Wednesday	16 July 2012	Free transfer
11	Freddie Sears	ST	(England)	Hornchurch	27 November 1989 (aged 22)	11	2	(England) West Ham United	1 July 2012	Free transfer
17	Jabo Ibehre	FW	(England)	Islington	28 January 1983 (aged 29)	15	4	(England) Milton Keynes Dons	21 January 2013	Free transfer
19	Freddie Ladapo	ST	(England)	Romford	1 February 1993 (aged 19)	0	0	Youth team	16 March 2012	Free transfer
21	Gavin Massey	FW	(England)	Watford	4 October 1992 (aged 19)	8	0	(England) Watford	21 August 2012	Free transfer
27	Tosin Olufemi	WG/FB	(England)	Hackney	13 May 1994 (aged 18)	0	0	Academy	1 July 2012	Free transfer
35	Nnamdi Nwachuku	FW	(Nigeria)		27 November 1994 (aged 17)	0	0	Youth team	4 July 2011	Free transfer
42	Macauley Bonne	ST	(Zimbabwe)	(England) Ipswich	26 October 1995 (aged 16)	0	0	Academy	2 July 2012	Free transfer
Scholars
	Jack Curtis	MF	(England)	Brentwood	11 September 1995 (aged 16)	0	0	Academy	2 July 2012	Free transfer
	Frankie Kent	CB	(England)	Romford	21 November 1995 (aged 16)	0	0	Academy	2 July 2012	Free transfer
	Gus Mafuta	DF	(England)	Clevedon	11 June 1995 (aged 16)	0	0	Youth team	4 July 2011	Free transfer
	Michael O'Donoghue	DF	(Republic of Ireland)	(England) Islington	18 January 1996 (aged 16)	0	0	Academy	2 July 2012	Free transfer
	Billy Roast	DF	(England)		6 June 1995 (aged 16)	0	0	Youth team	4 July 2011	Free transfer
	Jack Simmons	MF	(Wales)	(England) Basildon	25 November 1994 (aged 17)	0	0	(England) Ipswich Town	25 April 2012	Free transfer

== Transfers ==
=== In ===
Date	Position	Nationality	Name	From	Fee	Ref.
9 May 2012	MF	(England)	Ryan Melaugh	Academy	Free transfer	(Note: Officially signed on 1 July 2012)
9 May 2012	WG/FB	(England)	Tosin Olufemi	Academy	Free transfer	
9 May 2012	GK	(England)	Shaun Phillips	Academy	Free transfer	
8 June 2012	MF	(Jamaica)	Marcus Bean	(England) Brentford	Free transfer	(Note: Officially joined the club on 1 July 2012)
2 July 2012	ST	(Zimbabwe)	Macauley Bonne	Academy	Free transfer	
2 July 2012	MF	(England)	Jack Curtis	Academy	Free transfer	
2 July 2012	CB	(England)	Frankie Kent	Academy	Free transfer	
2 July 2012	MF	(England)	Tom Lapslie	Academy	Free transfer	
2 July 2012	DF	(Republic of Ireland)	Michael O'Donoghue	Academy	Free transfer	
4 July 2012	ST	(England)	Freddie Sears	(England) West Ham United	Free transfer	
16 July 2012	FW	(Republic of Ireland)	Clinton Morrison	(England) Sheffield Wednesday	Free transfer	
30 July 2012	MF	(England)	Merrick James-Lewis	(England) Southend United	Free transfer	
30 July 2012	FB	(England)	Jackson Ramm	(England) Blackburn Rovers	Free transfer	
21 August 2012	FW	(England)	Gavin Massey	(England) Watford	Free transfer	
22 December 2012	LM	(Wales)	Jack Compton	(England) Portsmouth	Free transfer	(Note: Officially joined the club on 3 January 2018)
28 December 2012	CB	(England)	Josh Thompson	(England) Portsmouth	Free transfer	(Note: Officially joined the club on 1 January 2018)
21 January 2013	FW	(England)	Jabo Ibehre	(England) Milton Keynes Dons	Free transfer	
25 January 2013	FB/DM	(England)	David Wright	(England) Crystal Palace	Free transfer	

- Total spending: ▼ ~ £0

=== Out ===
Date	Position	Nationality	Name	To	Fee	Ref.
15 May 2012	FW	(Nigeria)	Kayode Odejayi	(England) Rotherham United	Free transfer	(Note: Officially left the club on 1 July 2012)
31 May 2012	MF	(Republic of Ireland)	Martin Rowlands	(England) Leyton Orient (Note: Following Rowlands' release by Colchester United, he joined Leyton Orient.)	Released	
12 June 2012	WG	(England)	Ashley Vincent	(England) Port Vale (Note: Following Vincent's release by Colchester United, he joined Port Vale.)	Released	
18 June 2012	FW	(England)	Steven Gillespie	(England) Fleetwood Town	Undisclosed	
3 July 2012	GK	(England)	Ben Williams	(Scotland) Hibernian	Free transfer	(Note: Officially left the club on 3 July 2012)
18 July 2012	MF/FB	(Wales)	Lloyd James	(England) Leyton Orient	Free transfer	
13 December 2012	MF	(England)	Merrick James-Lewis	(England) Ebbsfleet United (Note: Following James-Lewis' release by Colchester United, he joined Ebbsfleet United.)	Released	
24 January 2013	DF	(Scotland)	Tom Aldred	(England) Accrington Stanley (Note: Following Aldred's release by Colchester United, he joined Accrington Stanley.)	Released	
24 January 2013	GK	(England)	Carl Pentney	(England) Bishop's Stortford	Released	
30 January 2013	MF	(England)	Anthony Wordsworth	(England) Ipswich Town	£100,000	
31 January 2013	CB	(Wales)	Tom Bender	(England) Millwall (Note: Following Bender's release by Colchester United, he joined Millwall.)	Released	
31 January 2013	DF/MF	(England)	Ben Coker	(England) Histon (Note: Following Coker's release by Colchester United, he joined Histon.)	Released	
31 January 2013	FW/MF	(England)	Ian Henderson	(England) Rochdale (Note: Following Henderson's release by Colchester United, he joined Rochdale.)	Released	
31 January 2013	LB	(England)	Michael Rose	(England) Rochdale (Note: Following Rose's release by Colchester United, he joined Rochdale.)	Released	
11 April 2013	LM	(Wales)	Jack Compton	(England) Hartlepool United (Note: Following Compton's release by Colchester United, he joined Hartlepool United.)	Released	

- Total incoming: ▲ ~ £100,000

=== Loans in ===
Date	Position	Nationality	Name	From	End date	Ref.
27 September 2012	MF	(England)	Craig Eastmond	(England) Arsenal	27 December 2012	
27 September 2012	FW	(England)	Jabo Ibehre	(England) Milton Keynes Dons	27 December 2012	
27 September 2012	ST	(England)	Sanchez Watt	(England) Arsenal	27 December 2012	
23 October 2012	GK	(England)	Archange Nkumu	(England) Chelsea	13 December 2013	
9 November 2012	GK	(England)	John Sullivan	(England) Charlton Athletic	9 December 2012	
9 November 2012	CB	(England)	Josh Thompson	(England) Portsmouth	30 December 2012	
22 November 2012	DF	(England)	Dan Potts	(England) West Ham United	3 January 2013	
1 January 2013	LM	(Wales)	Jack Compton	(England) Portsmouth	3 January 2013	
1 January 2013	WG/ST	(England)	George Porter	(England) Burnley	31 May 2013	
3 January 2013	ST	(England)	Dominic Samuel	(England) Reading	31 January 2013	
11 January 2013	MF	(England)	Billy Clifford	(England) Chelsea	28 April 2013	
14 January 2013	GK	(England)	Sam Walker	(England) Chelsea	31 May 2013	
14 February 2013	FB/MF	(Republic of Ireland)	Bradley Garmston	(England) West Bromwich Albion	30 April 2013	
7 March 2013	ST	(England)	Troy Hewitt	(England) Queens Park Rangers	12 April 2013	
8 March 2013	ST	(England)	Michael Smith	(England) Charlton Athletic	28 April 2013	

=== Loans out ===
Date	Position	Nationality	Name	To	End date	Ref.
26 August 2012	DF	(Scotland)	Tom Aldred	(England) Barrow	30 January 2013	
28 September 2012	MF	(England)	Andy Bond	(England) Crewe Alexandra	15 October 2012	
12 October 2012	DF/MF	(England)	Ben Coker	(England) Histon	12 November 2012	
9 November 2012	GK	(England)	Carl Pentney	(England) Histon	9 December 2012	
30 November 2012	CB	(Wales)	Tom Bender	(England) Chelmsford City	7 January 2013	
30 November 2012	DF	(England)	Bradley Hamilton	(England) Chelmsford City	End of season	
13 December 2012	FB	(England)	Jackson Ramm	(England) Cambridge City		
14 December 2012	GK	(England)	Shaun Phillips	(England) Leiston		
24 December 2012	MF	(England)	Ryan Melaugh	(England) Bishop's Stortford		
January 2013	ST	(Nigeria)	Nnamdi Nwachuku	(England) Bishop's Stortford		
1 January 2013	MF	(Republic of Ireland)	John-Joe O'Toole	(England) Bristol Rovers	5 April 2013	
17 January 2013	GK	(England)	Carl Pentney	(England) Bishop's Stortford	24 January 2013	
27 March 2013	MF	(England)	Alex Gilbey	(Wales) Newport County	31 May 2013	

== Match details ==
=== Friendlies ===
14 July 2012 Friendly	Heybridge Swifts	0–6	Colchester United	Heybridge
15:00 BST		Report	Henderson 16', 19'; Sears 26', 28'; Olufemi 75', 86'	Stadium: Scraley Road

18 July 2012 Friendly	Vitesse (Netherlands)	2–3	Colchester United	Doorwerth
14:30 CEST	Unknown goalscorer	Report	Ladapo 20'; Bean 38'; Sears 48'	Stadium: Golden Tulip Hotel

21 July 2012 Friendly	Colchester United	1–2	West Ham United	Colchester
15:00 BST	Wordsworth 43'	Report	Maynard 20'; Noble 36'	Stadium: Colchester Community Stadium; Attendance: 7,985

24 July 2012 Friendly	Witham Town	4–1	Colchester United	Witham
19:45 BST	Unknown goalscorer	Report	Ramm	Stadium: Spa Road

27 July 2012 Friendly	Maldon & Tiptree	1–2	Colchester United	Maldon
19:45 BST	Unknown goalscorer	Report	Sears 15'; Dr. Wright 50'	Stadium: Wallace Binder Ground

28 July 2012 Friendly	Brentwood Town	1–2	Colchester United	Brentwood
15:00 BST	Stanley 40'	Report	O'Toole 41'; Ladapo 45'	Stadium: Brentwood Centre Arena

3 August 2012 Friendly	Colchester United	2–2	Derby County	Colchester
19:30 BST	Sears 42', 55'	Report	Okuonghae 9' (o.g.); Robinson 90'	Stadium: Colchester Community Stadium; Attendance: 1,352

8 August 2012 Friendly	Colchester United	1–2	Ipswich Town	Colchester
19:45 BST	Morrison 55'	Report	Chopra 22', 36'	Stadium: Colchester Community Stadium; Attendance: 3,873

11 August 2012 Friendly	Bishop's Stortford	0–1	Colchester United	Bishop's Stortford
15:00 BST		Report	Dr. Wright 19'	Stadium: Woodside Park

=== League One ===
==== League table ====
Pos	Team	Pld	W	D	L	GF	GA	GD	Pts	Promotion, qualification or relegation
18	Stevenage	46	15	9	22	47	64	−17	54	
19	Oldham Athletic	46	14	9	23	46	59	−13	51	
20	Colchester United	46	14	9	23	47	68	−21	51	
21	Scunthorpe United (R)	46	13	9	24	49	73	−24	48	Relegation to Football League Two
22	Bury (R)	46	9	14	23	45	73	−28	41	Relegation to Football League Two

Updated to match(es) played on 27 April 2013. Source: BBC Sport
Rules for classification: 1) Points; 2) Goal difference; 3) Number of goals scored
(R) Relegated

==== Results round by round ====
Round	1	2	3	4	5	6	7	8	9	10	11	12	13	14	15	16	17	18	19	20	21	22	23	24	25	26	27	28	29	30	31	32	33	34	35	36	37	38	39	40	41	42	43	44	45	46
Ground	A	H	H	A	A	H	H	A	H	A	A	H	H	A	A	H	A	H	H	A	H	A	A	H	A	A	H	H	A	H	H	A	H	H	A	A	H	A	A	H	A	H	A	H	H	A
Result	D	D	D	L	L	L	D	L	W	W	L	W	W	W	D	L	L	W	L	L	L	L	L	L	L	L	L	W	W	L	W	L	L	W	W	D	L	D	W	L	D	W	L	L	D	W
Position	15	14	16	20	22	24	22	22	20	17	19	17	15	12	12	13	14	13	16	17	17	17	19	20	20	20	21	20	19	19	19	20	21	21	19	19	19	19	19	19	19	19	19	20	20	20

Source: Statto.com (archived)
A = Away; H = Home; W = Win; D = Draw; L = Loss

==== Matches ====
18 August 2012 1	Preston North End	0–0	Colchester United	Preston
15:00 BST		Report		Stadium: Deepdale; Attendance: 10,034; Referee: Phil Gibbs

21 August 2012 2	Colchester United	2–2	Portsmouth	Colchester
19:45 BST	Rose 45'; Okuonghae 83'	Report	Rodgers 30'; Obita 86'	Stadium: Colchester Community Stadium; Attendance: 4,335; Referee: Lee Collins

25 August 2012 3	Colchester United	1–1	Sheffield United	Colchester
15:00 BST	Morrison 72'	Report	Cofie 17'	Stadium: Colchester Community Stadium; Attendance: 4,017; Referee: Gary Sutton

1 September 2012 4	Tranmere Rovers	4–0	Colchester United	Birkenhead
15:00 BST	Cassidy 40', 49', 77'; Bakayogo 58'	Report		Stadium: Prenton Park; Attendance: 4,711; Referee: Andrew Madley

8 September 2012 5	Brentford	1–0	Colchester United	Brentford
15:00 BST	El Alagui 88'	Report		Stadium: Griffin Park; Attendance: 5,499; Referee: Stuart Attwell

15 September 2012 6	Colchester United	1–2	Doncaster Rovers	Colchester
15:00 BST	Okuonghae 30'	Report	Cotterill 3'; Bond 48' (o.g.)	Stadium: Colchester Community Stadium; Attendance: 3,262; Referee: Gary Sutton

18 September 2012 7	Colchester United	1–1	Crawley Town	Colchester
19:45 BST	Wordsworth 86' (pen.)	Report	McFadzean 76'	Stadium: Colchester Community Stadium; Attendance: 2,484; Referee: Andy Woolmer

22 September 2012 8	Scunthorpe United	1–0	Colchester United	Scunthorpe
15:00 BST	Clarke 76' (pen.)	Report		Stadium: Glanford Park; Attendance: 3,133; Referee: Chris Sarginson

29 September 2012 9	Colchester United	3–1	Hartlepool United	Colchester
15:00 BST	Massey 39'; Ibehre 43', 62'	Report	Lynch 6'	Stadium: Colchester Community Stadium; Attendance: 3,471; Referee: Mick Russell

2 October 2012 10	Swindon Town	0–1	Colchester United	Swindon
		Report	Rose 70'	Stadium: County Ground; Attendance: 7,443; Referee: Iain Williamson

6 October 2012 11	Yeovil Town	3–1	Colchester United	Yeovil
15:00 BST	Madden 20', 34'; Hayter 78'	Report	Ibehre 25'	Stadium: Huish Park; Attendance: 3,002; Referee: Steve Bratt

13 October 2012 12	Colchester United	1–0	Stevenage	Colchester
15:00 BST	Watt 55'	Report	Grant (yellow card) 53' (red card)	Stadium: Colchester Community Stadium; Attendance: 4,405; Referee: Graham Salisbury

20 October 2012 13	Colchester United	2–0	Carlisle United	Colchester
15:00 BST	Eastmond 26'; Ibehre 31'	Report		Stadium: Colchester Community Stadium; Attendance: 3,335; Referee: Steve Rushton

23 October 2012 14	Leyton Orient	0–2	Colchester United	Leyton
19:45 BST		Report	Wordsworth 33'; Henderson 51'	Stadium: Brisbane Road; Attendance: 3,378; Referee: Dean Whitestone

27 October 2012 15	Shrewsbury Town	2–2	Colchester United	Shrewsbury
15:00 BST	Hall 79', 82'	Report	Eastmond 3'; Watt 62'	Stadium: New Meadow; Attendance: 5,066; Referee: Jeremy Simpson

6 November 2012 16	Colchester United	0–2	Notts County	Colchester
19:45 GMT		Report	Bishop 17'; Judge 44'	Stadium: Colchester Community Stadium; Attendance: 3,051; Referee: Carl Berry

10 November 2012 17	Crewe Alexandra	3–2	Colchester United	Crewe
15:00 GMT	Dalla Valle 51'; Murphy 64' (pen.); Pogba 74'	Report	Sears 3'; Henderson 30'	Stadium: Gresty Road; Attendance: 4,292; Referee: Eddie Ilderton

17 November 2012 18	Colchester United	2–0	Bury	Colchester
15:00 GMT	Wordsworth 56'; Sears 61'	Report		Stadium: Colchester Community Stadium; Attendance: 3,214; Referee: Stephen Martin

20 November 2012 19	Colchester United	1–3	Coventry City	Colchester
19:45 GMT	Eastman 71'	Report	Moussa 34'; Edjenguélé 37'; McGoldrick 87'	Stadium: Colchester Community Stadium; Attendance: 3,229; Referee: Trevor Kettle

24 November 2012 20	Milton Keynes Dons	5–1	Colchester United	Milton Keynes
15:00 GMT	Chadwick 28', 64'; Williams 37'; Otsemobor 61'; Lowe 82'	Report	Henderson 63'; Massey (red card) 67'	Stadium: Stadium MK; Attendance: 7,443; Referee: Darren Deadman

8 December 2012 21	Colchester United	0–2	Oldham Athletic	Colchester
15:00 GMT		Report	Mvoto 33'; Wilson 61' (o.g.)	Stadium: Colchester Community Stadium; Attendance: 2,987; Referee: Iain Williamson

15 December 2012 22	AFC Bournemouth	1–0	Colchester United	Bournemouth
15:00 GMT	Grabban 41'	Report		Stadium: Dean Court; Attendance: 6,145; Referee: Brendan Malone

22 December 2012 23	Walsall	1–0	Colchester United	Walsall
15:00 GMT	Brandy 61'	Report		Stadium: Bescot Stadium; Attendance: 3,006; Referee: Andrew Madley

26 December 2012 24	Colchester United	1–3	Brentford	Colchester
15:00 GMT	Dr. Wright 23'; Thompson (red card) 10'	Report	Trotta 4'; Forshaw 12'; Dean 85'; Adeyemi (yellow card) 45' (red card)	Stadium: Colchester Community Stadium; Attendance: 4,200; Referee: Gavin Ward

29 December 2012	Colchester United	P–P	Swindon Town	Colchester
15:00 GMT		Report		Stadium: Colchester Community Stadium
Note: Match postponed due to a waterlogged pitch.

1 January 2013 25	Crawley Town	3–0	Colchester United	Crawley
15:00 GMT	Connolly 5'; Clarke 71'; Adams 87'	Report		Stadium: Broadfield Stadium; Attendance: 3,160; Referee: Graham Scott

5 January 2013 26	Doncaster Rovers	1–0	Colchester United	Doncaster
15:00 GMT	Cotterill 84'	Report		Stadium: Keepmoat Stadium; Attendance: 6,373; Referee: Richard Clark

12 January 2013 27	Colchester United	1–2	Scunthorpe United	Colchester
15:00 GMT	Sears 59'	Report	Ryan 41'; Hawley 46'	Stadium: Colchester Community Stadium; Attendance: 3,258; Referee: Keith Stroud

19 January 2013	Hartlepool United	P–P	Colchester United	Hartlepool
15:00 GMT		Report		Stadium: Victoria Park
Note: Match postponed due to snow.

26 January 2013 28	Colchester United	2–0	Walsall	Colchester
15:00 GMT	Ibehre 79'; Sears 89'	Report		Stadium: Colchester Community Stadium; Attendance: 2,865; Referee: Dean Whitestone

2 February 2013 29	Portsmouth	2–3	Colchester United	Portsmouth
15:00 GMT	Wallace 5'; Keene 73'	Report	Massey 2', 20'; Sears 16' (pen.)	Stadium: Fratton Park; Attendance: 11,132; Referee: David Phillips

5 February 2013 30	Colchester United	0–1	Swindon Town	Colchester
19:45 GMT		Report	Collins 55'	Stadium: Colchester Community Stadium; Attendance: 3,214; Referee: Tim Robinson

9 February 2013 31	Colchester United	1–0	Preston North End	Colchester
15:00 GMT	Sears 55'	Report	Wright (yellow card) 83' (red card)	Stadium: Colchester Community Stadium; Attendance: 3,215; Referee: Mark Haywood

16 February 2013 32	Sheffield United	3–0	Colchester United	Sheffield
15:00 GMT	Robson 4' (pen.); McDonald 73'; Kitson 90'	Report		Stadium: Bramall Lane; Attendance: 16,860; Referee: David Webb

23 February 2013 33	Colchester United	1–5	Tranmere Rovers	Colchester
15:00 GMT	Okuonghae 29'	Report	Power 11'; Akpa Akpro 41'; Taylor 65'; Stockton 85'; O'Halloran 90' (pen.)	Stadium: Colchester Community Stadium; Attendance: 3,077; Referee: Keith Stroud

26 February 2013 34	Colchester United	2–0	Yeovil Town	Colchester
15:00 GMT	Clifford 45'; Sears 62'	Report		Stadium: Colchester Community Stadium; Attendance: 2,367; Referee: Steve Rushton

2 March 2013 35	Stevenage	0–2	Colchester United	Stevenage
15:00 GMT		Report	Ibehre 62', 73'	Stadium: Broadhall Way; Attendance: 3,144; Referee: Scott Duncan

5 March 2013 36	Hartlepool United	0–0	Colchester United	Hartlepool
19:45 GMT		Report	Ibehre (red card) 44'	Stadium: Victoria Park; Attendance: 3,148; Referee: Geoff Eltringham

9 March 2013 37	Colchester United	1–2	Crewe Alexandra	Colchester
15:00 GMT	Porter 42'	Report	Murphy 25' (pen.); Pogba 72'	Stadium: Colchester Community Stadium; Attendance: 3,085; Referee: Keith Hill

12 March 2013 38	Coventry City	2–2	Colchester United	Coventry
19:45 GMT	Wilson 77'; Baker 90'	Report	Massey 39'; Smith 72'	Stadium: Ricoh Arena; Attendance: 9,431; Referee: Stephen Martin

16 March 2013 39	Bury	1–2	Colchester United	Bury
15:00 GMT	Fagan 26'	Report	Thompson 30'; Morrison 31'; Porter (red card) 4'	Stadium: Gigg Lane; Attendance: 2,018; Referee: Bobby Madley

23 March 2013	Colchester United	P–P	Milton Keynes Dons	Colchester
15:00 GMT		Report		Stadium: Colchester Community Stadium
Note: Match postponed due to snow.

29 March 2013 40	Colchester United	0–1	AFC Bournemouth	Colchester
15:00 GMT		Report	Pitman 19'	Stadium: Colchester Community Stadium; Attendance: 4,727; Referee: Oliver Langford

1 April 2013 41	Oldham Athletic	1–1	Colchester United	Oldham
15:00 BST	Baxter 68'	Report	Dr. Wright 20'	Stadium: Boundary Park; Attendance: 4,244; Referee: Mark Haywood

6 April 2013 42	Colchester United	2–1	Leyton Orient	Colchester
15:00 BST	Massey 20'; Dr. Wright 24'	Report	Lisbie 37'	Stadium: Colchester Community Stadium; Attendance: 4,704; Referee: Richard Clark

13 April 2013 43	Notts County	3–1	Colchester United	Nottingham
15:00 BST	Hughes 18'; Arquin 77'; Nangle 90'	Report	Ibehre 37'	Stadium: Meadow Lane; Attendance: 4,306; Referee: Tony Harrington

16 April 2013 44	Colchester United	0–2	Milton Keynes Dons	Colchester
19:45 BST		Report	Powell 11'; Bamford 78'	Stadium: Colchester Community Stadium; Attendance: 3,175; Referee: Roger East

20 April 2013 45	Colchester United	0–0	Shrewsbury Town	Colchester
15:00 BST		Report		Stadium: Colchester Community Stadium; Attendance: 5,862; Referee: Howard Webb

27 April 2013 46	Carlisle United	0–2	Colchester United	Carlisle
15:00 BST		Report	Massey 65'; Eastman 80'	Stadium: Brunton Park; Attendance: 5,427; Referee: Carl Boyeson

=== Football League Cup ===
14 August 2012 1st round	Yeovil Town	3–0	Colchester United	Yeovil
19:45 BST	Hinds 4', 44'; Marsh-Brown 79'	Report		Stadium: Huish Park; Attendance: 1,907; Referee: Simon Hooper

=== Football League Trophy ===
9 October 2012 2nd round (southern section)	Northampton Town	2–1	Colchester United	Northampton
19:45 BST	Akinfenwa 52' (pen.); Mukendi 54'	Report	Sears 31'; Morrison (red card) 90+3'	Stadium: Sixfields Stadium; Attendance: 1,561; Referee: Oliver Langford

=== FA Cup ===
3 November 2012 1st round	Chelmsford City	3–1	Colchester United	Chelmsford
15:00 GMT	Simmonds 23', 63'; Slabber 89'	Report	Rose 70'	Stadium: Melbourne Stadium; Attendance: 3,017; Referee: Michael Naylor

== Squad statistics ==
=== Appearances and goals ===
No.	Pos	Nat	Player	Total		League One		FA Cup		League Cup		Football League Trophy	
No.	Pos	Nat	Player	Apps	Goals	Apps	Goals	Apps	Goals	Apps	Goals	Apps	Goals
1	GK	(England) ENG	Mark Cousins	26	0	23	0	1	0	1	0	1	0
2	DF	(England) ENG	David Wright	12	0	12	0	0	0	0	0	0	0
4	DF	(England) ENG	Magnus Okuonghae	46	3	42+1	3	1	0	1	0	1	0
6	DF	(England) ENG	Matt Heath	7	0	6	0	0	0	0	0	1	0
7	MF	(England) ENG	Karl Duguid	7	0	3+2	0	0	0	0+1	0	1	0
8	MF	(Republic of Ireland) IRL	John-Joe O'Toole	16	0	4+11	0	0	0	0+1	0	0	0
9	FW	(Republic of Ireland) IRL	Clinton Morrison	35	2	17+15	2	0+1	0	1	0	1	0
10	MF	(England) ENG	Kemal Izzet	12	0	9+2	0	0	0	1	0	0	0
11	FW	(England) ENG	Freddie Sears	37	8	22+13	7	0+1	0	0	0	1	1
14	MF	(England) ENG	Andy Bond	28	0	16+11	0	0	0	1	0	0	0
15	MF	(Jamaica) JAM	Marcus Bean	33	0	26+5	0	1	0	0	0	1	0
17 (Note: Ibehre wore shirt number 12 during his initial loan spell with the club)	FW	(England) ENG	Jabo Ibehre	31	8	30	8	1	0	0	0	0	0
18	DF	(England) ENG	Tom Eastman	32	2	26+3	2	1	0	1	0	0+1	0
19	FW	(England) ENG	Freddie Ladapo	4	0	0+4	0	0	0	0	0	0	0
20	DF	(England) ENG	Brian Wilson	42	0	41	0	0	0	1	0	0	0
21	FW	(England) ENG	Gavin Massey	41	6	34+6	6	0+1	0	0	0	0	0
25	DF	(England) ENG	John White	24	0	16+6	0	1	0	0	0	1	0
27	FW	(England) ENG	Tosin Olufemi	1	0	0+1	0	0	0	0	0	0	0
28	MF	(England) ENG	Alex Gilbey	4	0	2+1	0	0	0	0	0	0+1	0
30	MF	(England) ENG	Drey Wright	23	3	9+12	3	0	0	1	0	0+1	0
40	DF	(England) ENG	Josh Thompson	22	1	16+6	1	0	0	0	0	0	0
Players who appeared for Colchester who left during the season
3	DF	(Republic of Ireland) IRL	Bradley Garmston	13	0	10+3	0	0	0	0	0	0	0
3	DF	(England) ENG	Michael Rose	24	3	22	2	1	1	1	0	0	0
12	FW	(England) ENG	Troy Hewitt	1	0	0+1	0	0	0	0	0	0	0
12	FW	(England) ENG	Dominic Samuel	2	0	2	0	0	0	0	0	0	0
13	GK	(England) ENG	John Sullivan	4	0	4	0	0	0	0	0	0	0
16	FW	(England) ENG	Ian Henderson	25	3	14+8	3	1	0	1	0	1	0
22	FW	(England) ENG	Michael Smith	8	1	3+5	1	0	0	0	0	0	0
22	MF	(England) ENG	Anthony Wordsworth	27	3	23+1	3	1	0	1	0	1	0
24	DF	(England) ENG	Ben Coker	2	0	1	0	0	0	0	0	1	0
33	MF	(Wales) WAL	Jack Compton	7	0	1+6	0	0	0	0	0	0	0
33	MF	(England) ENG	Craig Eastmond	13	2	12	2	1	0	0	0	0	0
39	FW	(England) ENG	George Porter	19	1	13+6	1	0	0	0	0	0	0
39	FW	(England) ENG	Sanchez Watt	7	2	5+1	2	1	0	0	0	0	0
41	MF	(England) ENG	Billy Clifford	18	1	18	1	0	0	0	0	0	0
41	DF	(England) ENG	Dan Potts	5	0	5	0	0	0	0	0	0	0
44	GK	(England) ENG	Sam Walker	19	0	19	0	0	0	0	0	0	0

=== Goalscorers ===
Place	Number	Nationality	Position	Name	League One	FA Cup	League Cup	Football League Trophy	Total
1	11	(England)	ST	Freddie Sears	7	0	0	0	8
1	17 (Note: Ibehre wore shirt number 12 during his initial loan spell with the club)	(England)	FW	Jabo Ibehre	8	0	0	0	8
3	21	(England)	FW	Gavin Massey	6	0	0	0	6
4	3	(England)	LB	Michael Rose	2	1	0	0	3
4	4	(England)	CB	Magnus Okuonghae	3	0	0	0	3
4	16	(England)	FW/MF	Ian Henderson	3	0	0	0	3
4	22	(England)	MF	Anthony Wordsworth	3	0	0	0	3
4	30	(England)	MF	Drey Wright	3	0	0	0	3
9	9	(Republic of Ireland)	FW	Clinton Morrison	2	0	0	0	2
9	18	(England)	CB	Tom Eastman	2	0	0	0	2
9	33	(England)	MF	Craig Eastmond	2	0	0	0	2
9	39	(England)	ST	Sanchez Watt	2	0	0	0	2
13	ST	(England)	FW	Michael Smith	1	0	0	0	1
13	39	(England)	WG/ST	George Porter	1	0	0	0	1
13	40	(England)	CB	Josh Thompson	1	0	0	0	1
13	41	(England)	MF	Billy Clifford	1	0	0	0	1
				Own goals	0	0	0	0	0
				TOTALS	47	1	0	1	49

=== Disciplinary record ===
Number	Nationality	Position	Name	League One		FA Cup		League Cup		Football League Trophy		Total	
Number	Nationality	Position	Name	Booked	Sent off (straight red)	Booked	Sent off (straight red)	Booked	Sent off (straight red)	Booked	Sent off (straight red)	Booked	Sent off (straight red)
22	(England)	MF	Anthony Wordsworth	11	0	0	0	0	0	0	0	11	0
20	(England)	FB	Brian Wilson	9	0	0	0	0	0	0	0	9	0
40	(England)	CB	Josh Thompson	6	1	0	0	0	0	0	0	6	1
17 (Note: Ibehre wore shirt number 12 during his initial loan spell with the club)	(England)	FW	Jabo Ibehre	5	1	0	0	0	0	0	0	5	1
39	(England)	WG/ST	George Porter	5	1	0	0	0	0	0	0	5	1
15	(Jamaica)	MF	Marcus Bean	7	0	0	0	0	0	0	0	7	0
21	(England)	FW	Gavin Massey	4	1	0	0	0	0	0	0	4	1
4	(England)	CB	Magnus Okuonghae	6	0	0	0	0	0	0	0	6	0
9	(Republic of Ireland)	FW	Clinton Morrison	2	0	0	0	0	0	0	1	2	1
16	(England)	FW/MF	Ian Henderson	3	0	0	0	0	0	0	0	3	0
25	(England)	FB	John White	3	0	0	0	0	0	0	0	3	0
33	(England)	MF	Craig Eastmond	3	0	0	0	0	0	0	0	3	0
3	(England)	LB	Michael Rose	2	0	0	0	0	0	0	0	2	0
41	(England)	MF	Billy Clifford	2	0	0	0	0	0	0	0	2	0
3	(Republic of Ireland)	FB/MF	Bradley Garmston	1	0	0	0	0	0	0	0	1	0
8	(Republic of Ireland)	MF	John-Joe O'Toole	1	0	0	0	0	0	0	0	1	0
10	(England)	MF	Kemal Izzet	1	0	0	0	0	0	0	0	1	0
11	(England)	ST	Freddie Sears	1	0	0	0	0	0	0	0	1	0
18	(England)	CB	Tom Eastman	1	0	0	0	0	0	0	0	1	0
33	(Wales)	LM	Jack Compton	1	0	0	0	0	0	0	0	1	0
39	(England)	ST	Sanchez Watt	1	0	0	0	0	0	0	0	1	0
41	(England)	DF	Dan Potts	1	0	0	0	0	0	0	0	1	0
			TOTALS	76	4	0	0	0	0	0	1	76	5

=== Captains ===
Number of games played as team captain.

Place	Number	Nationality	Position	Player	League One	FA Cup	League Cup	Football League Trophy	Total
1	22	(England)	MF	Anthony Wordsworth	12	1	0	1	14
2	20	(England)	FB	Brian Wilson	12	0	0	0	12
3	10	(England)	MF	Kemal Izzet	9	0	1	0	10
4	40	(England)	CB	Josh Thompson	6	0	0	0	6
5	6	(England)	CB	Matt Heath	4	0	0	0	4
6	2	(England)	FB/DM	David Wright	1	0	0	0	1
6	3	(England)	LB	Michael Rose	1	0	0	0	1
				Not recorded	1	0	0	0	1
				TOTALS	46	1	1	1	49

=== Clean sheets ===
Number of games goalkeepers kept a clean sheet.

Place	Number	Nationality	Player	League One	FA Cup	League Cup	Football League Trophy	Total
1	44	(England)	Sam Walker	7	0	0	0	7
2	1	(England)	Mark Cousins	5	0	0	0	5
3	13	(England)	John Sullivan	1	0	0	0	1
			TOTALS	13	0	0	0	13

=== Player debuts ===
Players making their first-team Colchester United debut in a fully competitive match.

Number	Position	Nationality	Player	Date	Opponent	Ground	Notes
9	FW	(Republic of Ireland)	Clinton Morrison	14 August 2012	Yeovil Town	Huish Park	
30	MF	(England)	Drey Wright	14 August 2012	Yeovil Town	Huish Park	
11	ST	(England)	Freddie Sears	18 August 2012	Preston North End	Deepdale	(Note: Second debut for the club)
15	MF	(Jamaica)	Marcus Bean	14 August 2012	Preston North End	Deepdale	
21	FW	(England)	Gavin Massey	25 August 2012	Sheffield United	Colchester Community Stadium	(Note: Third debut for the club)
12	FW	(England)	Jabo Ibehre	29 September 2012	Hartlepool United	Colchester Community Stadium	
33	MF	(England)	Craig Eastmond	29 September 2012	Hartlepool United	Colchester Community Stadium	
39	ST	(England)	Sanchez Watt	29 September 2012	Hartlepool United	Colchester Community Stadium	
28	MF	(England)	Alex Gilbey	9 October 2012	Northampton Town	Sixfields Stadium	
13	GK	(England)	John Sullivan	10 November 2012	Crewe Alexandra	Gresty Road	
40	CB	(England)	Josh Thompson	17 November 2012	Bury	Colchester Community Stadium	
41	DF	(England)	Dan Potts	24 November 2012	Milton Keynes Dons	Stadium MK	
19	ST	(England)	Freddie Ladapo	26 December 2012	Brentford	Colchester Community Stadium	
33	LM	(Wales)	Jack Compton	1 January 2013	Crawley Town	Broadfield Stadium	
39	WG/ST	(England)	George Porter	1 January 2013	Crawley Town	Broadfield Stadium	
12	ST	(England)	Dominic Samuel	5 January 2013	Doncaster Rovers	Keepmoat Stadium	
33	LM	(Wales)	Jack Compton	5 January 2013	Doncaster Rovers	Keepmoat Stadium	
40	CB	(England)	Josh Thompson	5 January 2013	Doncaster Rovers	Keepmoat Stadium	
41	MF	(England)	Billy Clifford	13 January 2013	Scunthorpe United	Colchester Community Stadium	
2	FB/DM	(England)	David Wright	26 January 2013	Walsall	Colchester Community Stadium	
17	FW	(England)	Jabo Ibehre	26 January 2013	Walsall	Colchester Community Stadium	
44	GK	(England)	Sam Walker	26 January 2013	Walsall	Colchester Community Stadium	
3	FB/MF	(Republic of Ireland)	Bradley Garmston	16 February 2013	Sheffield United	Bramall Lane	
12	ST	(England)	Troy Hewitt	9 March 2013	Crewe Alexandra	Colchester Community Stadium	
22	ST	(England)	Michael Smith	9 March 2013	Crewe Alexandra	Colchester Community Stadium	
27	WG/FB	(England)	Tosin Olufemi	17 March 2013	Bury	Gigg Lane	

== Honours and awards ==
Players to receive awards at the club's End of Season Awards Dinner held on 30 April 2013.

Award	Player	Notes
Colchester United Player of the Year award	(England) Jabo Ibehre	
Young Player of the Year award	(England) Drey Wright	
Players' Player of the Year award	(England) Gavin Massey	
Community Player of the Year award	(England) Matt Heath	
Colchester United Supporters Association Home Player of the Year award	(England) Jabo Ibehre	
Colchester United Supporters Association Away Player of the Year award	(England) Jabo Ibehre	
Goal of the Season award	(England) Michael Rose	v Portsmouth, 21 August 2012

== See also ==
- List of Colchester United F.C. seasons
