= Drey Wright =

English footballer (born 1995)

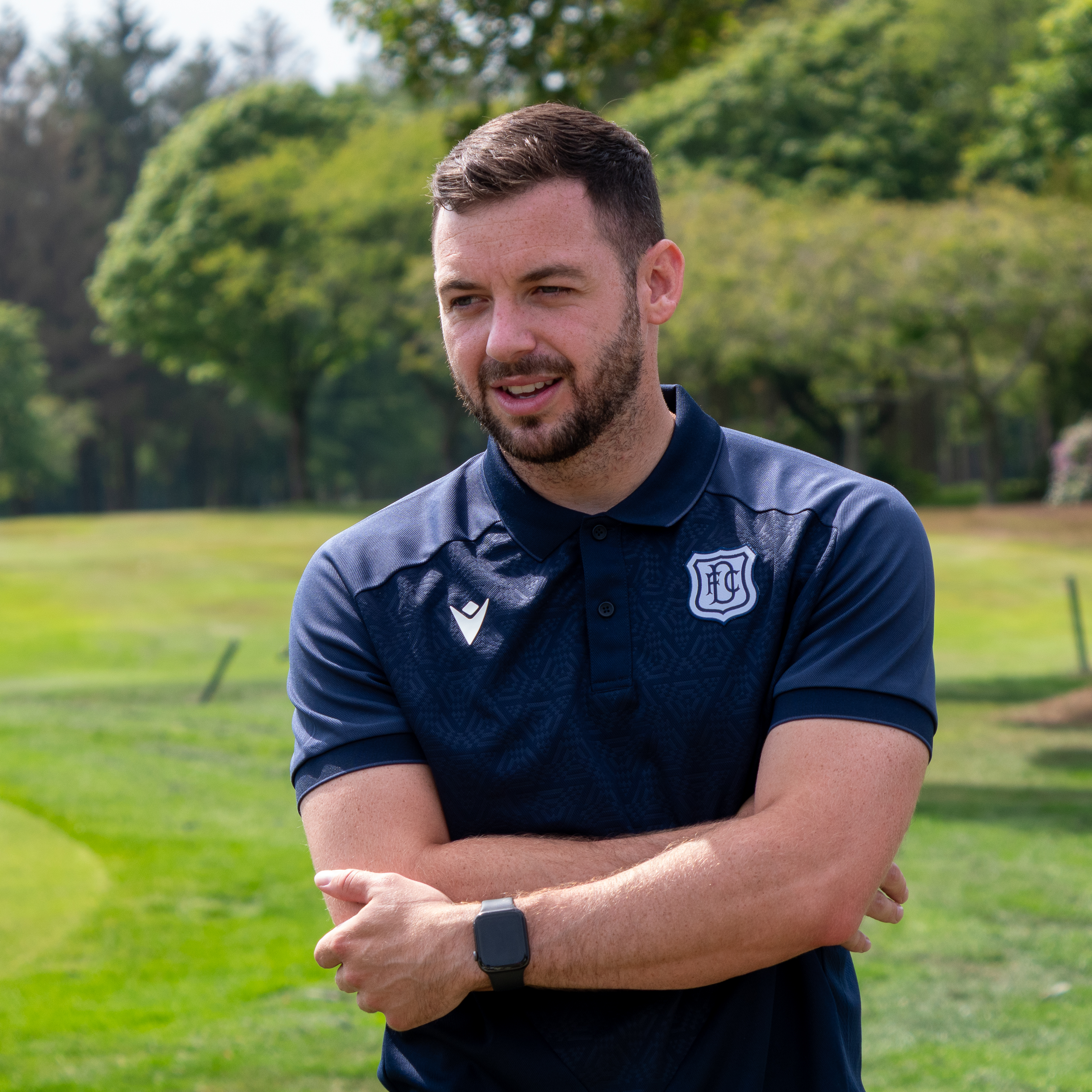
- Wright in 2025

Personal information
- Full name: Drey Jermaine Wright
- Date of birth: 30 April 1995 (age 31)
- Place of birth: Greenwich, London, England
- Height: 5 ft 9 in (1.75 m)
- Positions: Right-back; right winger

Team information
- Current team: Dundee
- Number: 7

Youth career
- Colchester United

Senior career*
Years	Team	Apps	(Gls)
2012–2018	Colchester United	135	(8)
2018–2020	St Johnstone	36	(1)
2020–2022	Hibernian	37	(2)
2022–2025	St Johnstone	78	(8)
2025–	Dundee	48	(3)
- * Club domestic league appearances and goals as of 21 November 2026

Drey Jermaine Wright (born 30 April 1995) is an English professional footballer who plays as a right-back or right winger. He plays for Scottish Premiership club Dundee.

The son of former Ipswich Town and Southampton midfielder Jermaine Wright, Wright progressed through the Academy at Colchester United before he made his first-team debut in 2012. He made over 150 career appearances for Colchester before leaving to join St Johnstone in May 2018. After two seasons with Hibernian, Wright returned to St Johnstone in 2022 for another three seasons.

== Career ==
=== Colchester United ===
Born in Greenwich, London, Wright is the son of former Ipswich Town and Southampton midfielder Jermaine Wright, and brother to fellow footballer Diaz Wright. A rapid winger who progressed through the Academy at Colchester United, Wright featured for the Colchester first-team in the 2011–12 pre-season campaign, scoring in a 6–2 friendly win over Whitton United on 27 July 2011 for a youthful U's side. He mostly featured for the youth and reserve sides throughout the season, alongside appearances in the Essex Senior Cup. He netted in their 4–0 semi-final win against Concord Rangers on 23 February 2012 to earn a place in the final. He featured in the final held against Canvey Island on 17 April, a game in which Colchester were defeated 1–0. He then scored in the reserve side's penultimate game of the campaign on 24 April in a 2–1 win against Oxford United. Despite a defeat to Luton Town in the final game, he helped the side claim the last-ever Football Combination North Division title on 1 May.

==== 2012–13 season ====
In May 2012, after just one year of his apprenticeship and on the back of his success with the club's reserve side, Wright signed a two-year professional development contract with Colchester alongside fellow academy products Bradley Hamilton, Ryan Melaugh, Tosin Olufemi and Shaun Phillips. Wright featured in the first-team preparations for the 2012–13 season, with Colchester manager John Ward saying that "it doesn't really surprise me" that both Wright and teammate Alex Gilbey have made strides towards first-team football. Ward then handed Wright his professional debut in the League Cup tie against Yeovil Town on 14 August, the season's opening game. Wright started the match and played for 58 minutes before being replaced by Karl Duguid in the 3–0 defeat at Huish Park. He was drafted into the squad at the last minute following Freddie Sears' withdrawal, but earned praise from his manager despite being forced to play first-team football prematurely. His father, Jermaine, said he was "proud to see my son out there playing" and that "he plays with a smile on his face and he loves playing with the first team". He then made his first League One appearance for the club, coming on as a 79th-minute substitute for Clinton Morrison in Colchester's 2–2 home draw with Portsmouth on 21 August.

On 28 August, Wright's cross for Freddie Ladapo's goal in their Professional Development League Two match against Swansea City was enough to hand Colchester their first-ever win in the newly established under-21 league format. He scored his first professional goal on his first league start on Boxing Day in a 3–1 home defeat to Brentford, in which he played the full 90 minutes. Manager Joe Dunne enthused that "Drey Wright was outstanding" and "had an exceptional full debut and showed his strength".

In March 2013, Wright was shortlisted for the League Football Education ' League One Apprentice of the Year' award, nominated alongside Sheffield United's George Willis and eventual winner Luke James of Hartlepool United. Wright ended his first professional season with 23 first-team appearances, having scored three goals, and was rewarded at the club's annual end of season awards evening on his 18th birthday, earning the Colchester United 'Young Player of the Year' accolade ahead of Sam Walker and Gavin Massey.

==== 2013–14 season ====
With one year remaining on his contract, Wright signed a two-year extension on 26 July 2013 to keep him with the club until summer 2016. He was brought on as a substitute in the season's opening game on 3 August in a 1–0 win at Gillingham, setting up Andy Bond to score the 88th-minute winner.

A calf strain left Wright out of action in early September, but he recovered in time to make his first start of the season in their 2–0 away defeat to Coventry City on 8 September. Having undergone a knee operation in October 2013, Wright returned to light training with the squad in February 2014, having not featured since 14 September 2013 in the U's 2–2 draw with Bradford City. He continued his comeback from injury on 6 March when he played for 60 minutes in Colchester's Essex Senior Cup semi-final defeat to Concord Rangers. Manager Joe Dunne then announced that he was looking to loan Wright to another club to find first-team action elsewhere to aid his recovery process. However, Wright made his first appearance for the first-team in almost seven months as a substitute for David Wright in the U's 2–0 away defeat to Peterborough United on 2 April. Wright finished his injury-blighted campaign with 13 appearances.

==== 2014–15 season ====
After starting Colchester's first game of the season at home to Oldham Athletic on 9 August 2014, Wright suffered a recurrence of his knee injury, which forced him out of much of last season. He was withdrawn after 64 minutes and replaced by Dominic Vose in the 2–2 draw. He returned to first-team action for the first time in six weeks, and for the first time under new manager Tony Humes, on 20 September as an 84th-minute substitute for Gavin Massey in a 0–0 home draw with Bradford City.

Wright announced his return to full fitness in late September following his return to the first-team, and then scored his first goal of the season, and his first for the club in 18 months, with the opener in Colchester's 3–3 Football League Trophy draw with Gillingham on 7 October. Wright then limped out of the under-21 Development Squad's 5–0 defeat at home to Sheffield Wednesday on 14 October with another recurrence of his knee injury. As a result of the injury, Wright was ruled out for the rest of the season with cruciate ligament damage.

==== 2015–16 season ====
Wright returned to first-team action on 11 August 2015 as a second-half substitute during Colchester's 1–0 League Cup defeat to Reading. He celebrated his 50th career appearance for Colchester during the season, ending the campaign with 13 appearances. He was offered a new deal at the end of the season following Colchester's relegation to League Two. He signed a new one-year contract extension on 25 May 2016.

==== 2016–17 season ====
Wright scored his first goal in almost two years on 24 September 2016 with the opening goal in Colchester's 2–1 home defeat to Accrington Stanley. He made his 100th Colchester United appearance on 29 April 2017 in their 3–1 win at Leyton Orient, and made a total of 46 appearances in addition to scoring two goals across the season.

==== 2017–18 season ====
Following his most successful season to date for Colchester, Wright agreed a one-year contract extension with the club on 29 June 2017. Manager John McGreal suggested he might pick Wright in a more central midfield and attacking role instead of his more frequent wing position for the new season after playing and scoring during pre-season. He scored his first season goal on 27 January 2018 during Colchester's 2–2 draw with Port Vale.

=== St Johnstone ===
After six years in the Colchester United first team and three goals in 47 appearances during 2017–18, Wright signed a pre-contract agreement to join Scottish Premiership side St Johnstone in a two-year deal in May 2018. He made his competitive debut for the club on 16 July in a Scottish League Cup penalty shoot-out win over East Fife. Wright scored his first goal for the club on 18 August in St Johnstone's 4–2 extra-time win over Queen of the South. His first season at the club ended early when he suffered a knee injury in a match against Kilmarnock in November 2018. In August 2019, he returned to playing after nine months out. He rejected a new contract and left the Saints in June 2020.

=== Hibernian ===
On 10 July 2020, Wright signed for Hibernian on a two-year deal. On 20 September 2020, Wright scored his first goal for Hibernian in a 2–2 draw against Rangers. Wright made twenty-eight competitive appearances and scored one goal in his first season with Hibernian.

On 9 April 2022, Wright scored the opener in the Edinburgh derby for Hibernian, his second goal for the club, but the game ended in a 3–1 win for Hearts. Hibs released Wright in June 2022, at the end of his contract.

=== St Johnstone return ===
Wright returned to St Johnstone on 16 June 2022.

=== Dundee ===
On 12 June 2025, Wright joined Scottish Premiership club Dundee on a two-year deal. On 29 November, Wright scored his first goal for the Dark Blues in a home win over St Mirren. On 17 January 2026, Wright netted a late winner for Dundee away to Kilmarnock in the Scottish Cup. On 22 August, Wright scored a stunner at Tannadice Park in a Dundee derby win.

== Career statistics ==
As of 21 November 2026

Appearances and goals by club, season and competition
Club	Season	League			National cup (Note: Includes FA Cup, Scottish Cup)		League cup (Note: Includes EFL Cup, Scottish League Cup)		Other		Total	
Club	Season	Division	Apps	Goals	Apps	Goals	Apps	Goals	Apps	Goals	Apps	Goals
Colchester United	2012–13	League One	21	3	0	0	1	0	1 (Note: Appearance in Football League Trophy)	0	23	3
Colchester United	2013–14	League One	12	0	0	0	1	0	0	0	13	0
Colchester United	2014–15	League One	5	0	0	0	0	0	1	1	6	1
Colchester United	2015–16	League One	11	0	0	0	1	0	1	0	13	0
Colchester United	2016–17	League Two	42	2	1	0	0	0	3 (Note: Appearance(s) in EFL Trophy)	0	46	2
Colchester United	2017–18	League Two	44	3	1	0	1	0	1	0	47	3
Colchester United	Total		135	8	6	0	4	0	7	1	152	9
St Johnstone	2018–19	Scottish Premiership	14	1	0	0	6	1	—		20	1
St Johnstone	2019–20	Scottish Premiership	22	0	3	0	0	0	—		25	0
St Johnstone	Total		36	1	3	0	6	1	0	0	45	1
Hibernian	2020–21	Scottish Premiership	20	1	3	0	5	0	—		28	1
Hibernian	2021–22	Scottish Premiership	17	1	2	0	1	0	2 (Note: Appearances in the UEFA Conference League)	0	22	1
Hibernian	Total		37	2	5	0	6	0	2	0	50	2
St Johnstone	2022–23	Scottish Premiership	38	7	1	0	1	0	0	0	40	7
St Johnstone	2023–24	Scottish Premiership	9	0	0	0	3	0	0	0	12	0
St Johnstone	2024–25	Scottish Premiership	31	1	3	0	4	0	0	0	38	1
St Johnstone	Total		78	8	4	0	8	0	0	0	90	8
Dundee	2025–26	Scottish Premiership	35	2	2	1	4	0	0	0	41	3
Dundee	2026–27	Scottish Premiership	13	1	0	0	5	0	0	0	18	1
Dundee	Total		48	3	2	1	9	0	0	0	59	4
Career total			334	22	20	1	33	1	9	1	396	24

== Honours ==
Individual

- 2012–13 Colchester United Young Player of the Year
