= Anthony Wordsworth =

English footballer (born 1989)

Personal information
- Full name: Anthony Daniel Wordsworth
- Date of birth: 3 January 1989 (age 37)
- Place of birth: Camden, England
- Height: 1.85 m (6 ft 1 in)
- Position: Midfielder

Team information
- Current team: Ware

Youth career
- 1996–: Wimbledon
- –2007: Colchester United

Senior career*
Years	Team	Apps	(Gls)
2007–2013	Colchester United	177	(35)
2013–2015	Ipswich Town	18	(2)
2014	→ Rotherham United (loan)	6	(1)
2015	→ Crawley Town (loan)	18	(4)
2015–2018	Southend United	79	(18)
2018–2020	AFC Wimbledon	47	(3)
2020–2021	Barnet	18	(2)
2021–2022	Waterford	20	(4)
2022	Cheshunt	1	(0)
2022–2023	Enfield Town	6	(0)
2023–2024	Chelmsford City	25	(2)
2024–2026	Maldon & Tiptree	53	(4)
2026–	Ware	2	(0)
- * Club domestic league appearances and goals as of 18:31, 19 August 2026 (UTC)

Anthony Daniel Wordsworth (born 3 January 1989) is an English professional footballer who plays as a midfielder for Southern League Division One Central club Ware.

He started his career at Colchester United where he graduated from the youth system to the first team, making nearly 200 appearances in an eight-year spell with the club.

== Career ==
=== Colchester United ===
Born in Camden, London, Wordsworth is a product of the Colchester United youth system, and was handed a professional contract at the end of the 2006–07 season. He made his senior debut when appearing as a substitute in a League Cup defeat at Shrewsbury Town on 14 August 2007. His league debut came seven months later as a late substitute in a 1–1 home draw against Cardiff City. He made his first senior start three days later in a home defeat to Hull City.

Wordsworth signed a three-year contract extension in August 2008 after finishing as top-scorer during pre-season and a recent run in the first team. Wordsworth scored his first goal for the club in a 4–3 away defeat to Cheltenham Town on 11 October 2008, and his second goal doubled United's lead to make the score 2–0. He scored his third goal of the season in a 3–3 away draw against local rivals Southend United on 1 November 2008. Colchester manager Paul Lambert praised Wordsworth's goal saying it was a "terrific header, terrific cross in the first place".

A free kick specialist, Wordsworth put Colchester ahead in a 2–1 defeat away to Millwall on 31 October 2009 when he scored from a free kick. He scored a header against Brighton & Hove Albion in a 2–1 win on 11 December 2009 to take Colchester third in League One. Wordsworth again scored against Essex rivals Southend in a 2–1 away win, scoring the winner when he curled in a 20-yard free kick on 26 December 2009, before scoring again three days later at home to Southampton in a 2–1 win. He scored a double against Southend United on 8 February 2010 in a 2–0 home victory to ensure he had scored in the last three meetings between the two sides and he scored four days later in a 2–2 away draw with Stockport County. He scored in a 3–3 home draw with Brentford on 23 March 2010. Wordsworth scored another double in a comprehensive 3–0 win over Swindon Town on 10 April 2010. He scored a goal from 18-yards in a 1–1 draw against Tranmere Rovers on 24 April 2010. Wordsworth finished with 11 league goals for the 2009–10 season, even with Colchester winning just once in the final 13 games of the season.

Wordsworth opened his 2010–11 season with two goals in a 2–2 opening day away draw with Exeter City, with goals in the 10th and 11th minute, the second a free kick. He then scored in a 3–1 home win over Tranmere on 25 September 2010. He scored on New Years Day 2011 in a 3–3 home draw against Charlton Athletic. This was to be his last goal of the season. Wordsworth signed a new two-and-a-half-year deal with the club, having scored five goals in 18 appearances in the 2010–11 season and reaching double goalscoring figures in the previous season.

Wordsworth scored the first goal of the 2011–12 League One season with a goal from inside the six-yard box in the 11th minute of a 4–2 away win over Preston on the opening day of the season. He scored twice as Colchester trounced Oldham 4–1 for their first home win of the season on 27 August 2011. Wordsworth scored from close range in a 1–1 home draw with Leyton Orient on 10 September 2011. Three days later, Wordsworth scored an injury-time free-kick against Brentford for ten-man Colchester in another 1–1 draw. He then scored a winning penalty against Walsall in a 1–0 victory on 24 September 2011. He scored another free-kick against Notts County in a 4–2 win on 29 October 2011. He again scored the only goal in an away win over Hartlepool United on 17 December 2011 and then scored a goal in Colchester's 2–0 win over Exeter on 31 December. He scored a late header to rescue one point against Oldham in a 1–1 away draw on 28 February 2012 and scored a 5th minute curling effort against table-topping Charlton in a 2–0 win one week later. He fired in a long range shot in a 3–1 away defeat to Walsall on 27 March 2012. In the final game of the 2011–12 season, Wordsworth scored a 90th minute consolation goal from 18-yards to bring his goal tally for the season to 13 against Notts County in a 4–1 loss.

Wordsworth scored his first goal of the 2012–13 campaign with an 87th minute equalising penalty against Crawley Town on 18 September to lift Colchester from the bottom of the League One table. Captaining the team, he scored his second goal of the campaign in a 2–0 away defeat of Leyton Orient on 23 October, drilling home a Gavin Massey pass. His third came as the opening goal in a 2–0 victory against Bury on 17 November 2012.

=== Ipswich Town ===
Wordsworth joined Ipswich Town on 30 January 2013 for £100,000 on a two-and-a-half-year deal, with the option of an additional year. On his full debut for the club, Wordsworth cracked three vertebrae in a collision with Blackpool goalkeeper Matt Gilks and was forced to spend the weekend in hospital. He scored his first goal for the club in the defeat to Hull City on 13 April 2013, his first game back after that injury. He was released by the club at the end of the 2014–15 season.

==== Rotherham (loan) ====
On 22 August 2014, Wordsworth completed a half-season loan move to Rotherham United. He scored once for Rotherham in a 3–2 defeat to Bolton Wanderers.

==== Crawley Town (loan) ====
On 15 January 2015, Wordsworth joined Crawley Town on a three-month loan.

=== Southend United ===
In July 2015 Wordsworth signed a two-year contract at Southend United. At the end of the 2017–18 season he was released by the club.

=== AFC Wimbledon ===
On 12 July 2018, Wordsworth signed for AFC Wimbledon. He was released at the end of the 2019–20 season following the end of his contract.

=== Barnet ===
On 13 November 2020, Wordsworth signed for Barnet on a contract until the end of the season. After 19 appearances he left the club following the expiry of his contract.

=== Waterford ===
Following his release from Barnet, Wordsworth joined League of Ireland Premier Division side Waterford on 9 July 2021. On 5 November 2021, Wordsworth was struck by a firework in a game against Shamrock Rovers, resulting in treatment, before the game continued after a stoppage. He made a total of 17 appearances in all competitions over the season, scoring 5 goals as they were relegated to the League of Ireland First Division. On 17 January 2022, he signed a new contract with the club for the 2022 season.

=== Cheshunt ===
Wordsworth signed for National League South side Cheshunt ahead of the 2022–23 season. On 24 September 2022, he made his league debut in a 4–3 home defeat to Tonbridge Angels, in which he started the game. Wordsworth was replaced at half-time by Reece Beckles-Richards, who went on to score Cheshunt's third goal of the game. A mixture of lack of fitness and the club's wage bill saw Wordsworth released from the club within a week of his debut.

=== Enfield Town ===
Wordsworth signed for Isthmian League Premier Division side Enfield Town on 5 November 2022.

=== Chelmsford City ===
On 23 May 2023, Wordsworth stepped back up to the National League South, signing for Chelmsford City. On 8 May 2024, Chelmsford announced Wordsworth had left the club.

=== Maldon & Tiptree ===
On 13 June 2024, Maldon & Tiptree announced Wordsworth had signed for the club in a player-coach capacity.

=== Ware ===
In July 2026, Wordsworth joined Southern League Division One Central club Ware.

== Career statistics ==
As of end of 2025–26 season

Appearances and goals by club, season and competition
Club	Season	League			National Cup (Note: Includes FA Cup & FAI Cup)		League Cup		Other		Total	
Club	Season	Division	Apps	Goals	Apps	Goals	Apps	Goals	Apps	Goals	Apps	Goals
Colchester United	2006–07	Championship	0	0	0	0	0	0	—		0	0
Colchester United	2007–08	Championship	3	0	0	0	1	0	—		4	0
Colchester United	2008–09	League One	30	3	1	0	2	0	3 (Note: Appearances in EFL Trophy)	0	36	3
Colchester United	2009–10	League One	41	11	2	0	0	0	1	0	44	11
Colchester United	2010–11	League One	35	5	3	0	2	0	1	0	40	5
Colchester United	2011–12	League One	44	13	1	0	1	0	1	0	47	13
Colchester United	2012–13	League One	24	3	1	0	1	0	1	0	27	3
Colchester United	Total		177	35	8	0	7	0	7	0	199	35
Ipswich Town	2012–13	Championship	7	1	0	0	0	0	—		7	1
Ipswich Town	2013–14	Championship	10	1	1	0	0	0	—		11	1
Ipswich Town	2014–15	Championship	1	0	0	0	1	0	0	0	2	0
Ipswich Town	Total		18	2	1	0	1	0	0	0	20	2
Rotherham United (loan)	2014–15	Championship	6	1	0	0	0	0	—		6	1
Crawley Town (loan)	2014–15	League One	18	4	0	0	0	0	0	0	18	4
Southend United	2015–16	League One	21	4	0	0	1	0	1	0	23	4
Southend United	2016–17	League One	34	11	1	0	0	0	3	1	38	12
Southend United	2017–18	League One	24	3	1	0	0	0	1	0	26	3
Southend United	Total		79	18	2	0	1	0	5	1	87	19
AFC Wimbledon	2018–19	League One	37	2	5	1	2	0	2	2	46	5
AFC Wimbledon	2019–20	League One	10	1	0	0	0	0	0	0	10	1
AFC Wimbledon	Total		47	3	5	1	2	0	2	2	56	6
Barnet	2020–21	National League	18	2	1	0	–		–		19	2
Waterford	2021	League of Ireland Premier Division	14	3	2	1	–		1 (Note: Appearances in 2021 League of Ireland promotion/relegation playoffs)	1	17	5
Waterford	2022	League of Ireland First Division	6	1	–		–		0 (Note: Appearances in Munster Senior Cup)	0	6	1
Waterford	Total		20	4	2	1	–		1	1	23	6
Cheshunt	2022–23	National League South	1	0	–		–		–		1	0
Enfield Town	2022–23	Isthmian League Premier Division	6	0	–		–		–		6	0
Chelmsford City	2023–24	National League South	25	2	5	1	–		3 (Note: Appearance(s) in FA Trophy)	0	33	3
Maldon & Tiptree	2024–25	Isthmian League North Division	29	1	2	0	—		2	1	33	2
Maldon & Tiptree	2025–26	Isthmian League North Division	24	3	4	0	—		0	0	28	3
Maldon & Tiptree	Total		53	4	6	0	0	0	2	1	61	5
Career totals			468	75	30	3	11	0	20	5	529	83

== Personal life ==
He graduated in 2022 from Staffordshire University with a First class degree in Professional Sports Writing and Broadcasting.
