= Kayode Odejayi =

Nigerian footballer (born 1982)

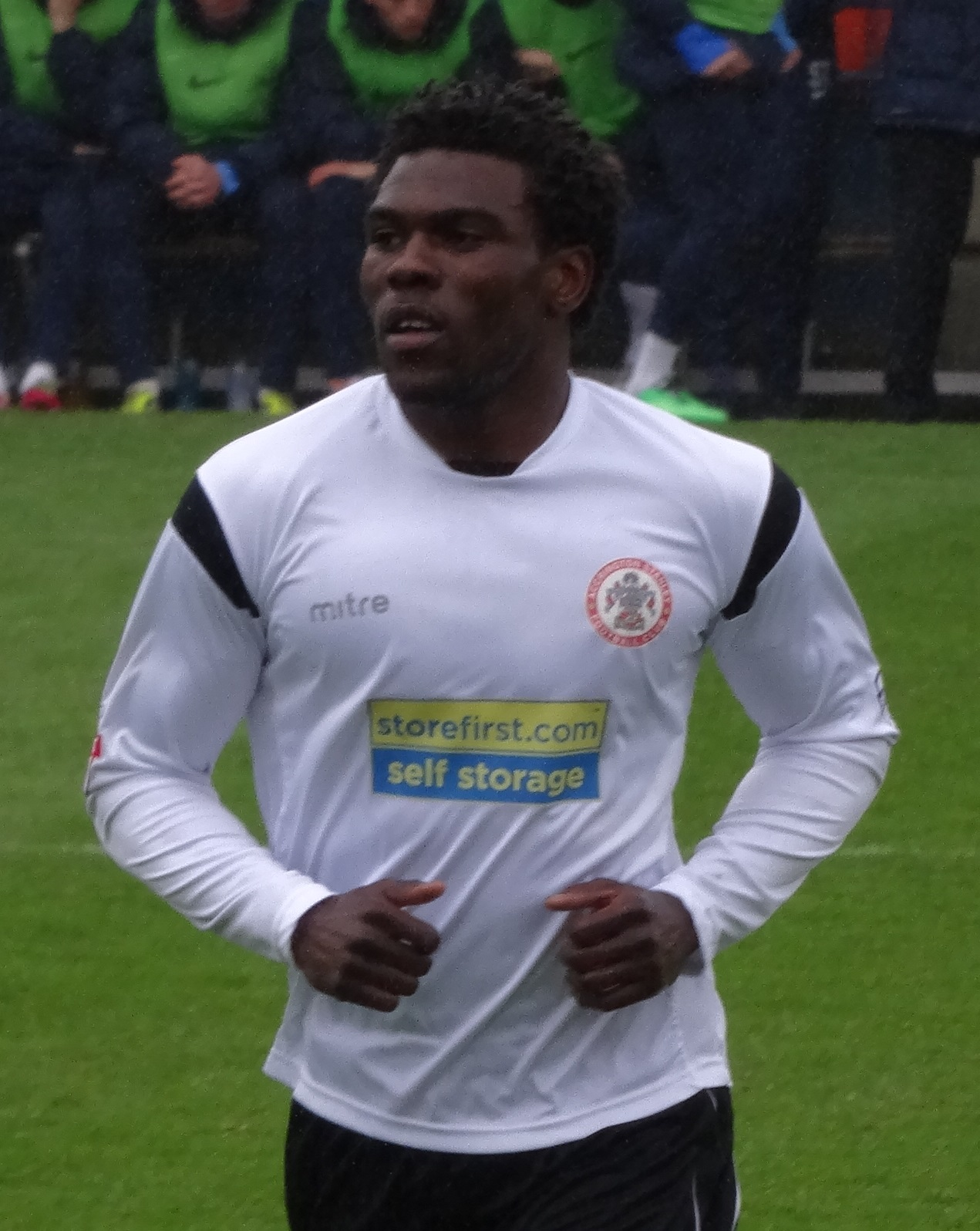
- Odejayi playing for Accrington Stanley in 2014

Personal information
- Full name: Olukayode Ishmael Odejayi
- Date of birth: 21 February 1982 (age 44)
- Place of birth: Ibadan, Nigeria
- Height: 1.91 m (6 ft 3 in)
- Position: Forward

Youth career
- –1999: Bristol City

Senior career*
Years	Team	Apps	(Gls)
1999–2002	Bristol City	6	(0)
2001	→ Forest Green Rovers (loan)	6	(1)
2002–2003	Forest Green Rovers	38	(13)
2003–2007	Cheltenham Town	148	(30)
2007–2010	Barnsley	72	(4)
2009	→ Scunthorpe United (loan)	6	(1)
2009	→ Colchester United (loan)	14	(6)
2010–2012	Colchester United	101	(11)
2012–2014	Rotherham United	42	(5)
2013–2014	→ Accrington Stanley (loan)	32	(8)
2014–2015	Tranmere Rovers	40	(5)
2015–2017	Stockport County	70	(8)
2017–2019	Guiseley	66	(7)
Total		641	(103)

International career
2008	Nigeria	1	(0)
- * Club domestic league appearances and goals

Olukayode Ishmael "Kayode" Odejayi (born 21 February 1982) is a Nigerian former professional footballer who plays as a forward. He made one appearance for the Nigeria national team.

== Club career ==
Born in Ibadan, Oyo State, Odejayi started his career as a trainee at Bristol City and then moved on to Football Conference side Forest Green Rovers in 2002. 2002–03 turned out to be one of Rovers' best ever season since their foundation in 1890, and Odejayi was a key figure, scoring 13 goals as the club finished ninth.

=== Cheltenham Town ===
Bobby Gould signed Odejayi in the summer of the 2002/03 season for Cheltenham Town. His first two seasons were a struggle but in his third season (2005–06) he played almost every game as Cheltenham went on to reach the play-off final, winning 1–0 against fancied Grimsby Town. He came to national attention in January 2006 when Cheltenham faced Newcastle United in the FA Cup 4th round. Odejayi gained plaudits after the game and he was linked with a move to Championship team Plymouth Argyle however the move never materialised.

=== Barnsley ===
On 31 May 2007, Odejayi moved to Barnsley for a fee of £200,000, a Cheltenham record for a sale of a player. Forest Green Rovers received a windfall from the transfer as part of the terms of Odejayi's Cheltenham deal.

He scored in the Reds' first friendly against Morecambe in a 2–1 defeat. He then bagged a brace against Portuguese side Louletano DC in a 3–2 win. In a 3–1 victory against Buxton he bagged his fourth goal in three.

Odejayi netted his first competitive goal for Barnsley against Scunthorpe United which effectively sealed a 2–0 victory for the Reds.

In January 2009, there was talk of him being pursued by Barnsley's South Yorkshire neighbours, Rotherham United.

==== Scunthorpe United (loan) ====
On 26 February he was loaned to Scunthorpe. He played in 6 games scoring 1 goal against Walsall.

==== Colchester United (loan) ====
He was loaned to Colchester United on 16 September 2009 on a three-month emergency loan. He made a big impression at the Weston Homes Community Stadium, winning two penalties in his first game against Hartlepool United and then scoring a brace against high flying Charlton Athletic. He also went on to score against Huddersfield Town, Leyton Orient, Wycombe Wanderers, Bromley and Oldham Athletic.

He set up John-Joe O'Toole's first Colchester goal in a 1–1 draw at Tranmere Rovers, whilst Odejayi also assisted Simon Hackney's goal against Bromley in the FA Cup. His loan spell ended on 19 December with him having scored seven goals in sixteen games, six of which came in the Football League. When the January transfer window opened, Odejayi's loan form resulted in him being signed by Aidy Boothroyd on a permanent deal, thus also becoming Aidy's first permanent signing for Colchester United.

=== Colchester United ===
On 24 December 2009 it was announced that Odejayi had signed for an undisclosed fee on a deal that would end in June 2012. Odejayi scored his first goal as a full-time Colchester player in a 2–1 win against Carlisle where he came off the bench to score the winner in stoppage time to keep the U's in their promotion hunt. He added two further goals against Bristol Rovers and Yeovil before getting an injury after coming on as a sub against Walsall. Odejayi was named as Colchester United's official player-of-the-season for the 2011–12 season, having led the front-line with power and strength all campaign.

=== Rotherham United ===
On 15 May, Rotherham United completed the much-rumoured signing of Odejayi after talks with Steve Evans. He joined the Millers officially on 1 July. His first goal for the club came in the 3–0 win against Burton Albion on 18 August 2012, this was also the opening day of the New York Stadium, and, on his league debut for the club. His second came soon after to gain a point against Chesterfield, on 25 August 2012. However, only 5 goals all season grew to fans frustration as Alex Revell and Daniel Nardiello became the preferred striking partnership.

On 10 September 2013, Odejayi joined League Two side Accrington Stanley on a three-month loan. On 1 January 2014, the loan was extended till the end of the 2013–14 League Two season.

=== Tranmere Rovers ===
On 26 June 2014, following Odejayi's departure from Rotherham United, he signed a one-year deal with Tranmere Rovers. At the end of the season, that saw Tranmere Rovers relegate out of League Two, Odejayi was released by the club.

=== Stockport County ===
Following Odejayi's release from Tranmere, he signed for National League North side Stockport County on 15 July 2015.

=== Guiseley ===
In July 2017 he signed for Guiseley.

== International career ==
In May 2008, Odejayi made his first appearance for the Nigerian national team, coming on as a second-half substitute in a 1–1 friendly draw against Austria.

== Career statistics ==
=== Club ===
As of match played 21 November 2017

Appearances and goals by club, season and competition
Club	Season	League			FA Cup		League Cup		Other		Total	
Club	Season	Division	Apps	Goals	Apps	Goals	Apps	Goals	Apps	Goals	Apps	Goals
Bristol City	1999–2000	Second Division	3	0	0	0	0	0	0	0	3	0
Bristol City	2000–01	Second Division	3	0	0	0	0	0	1 (Note: Appearances in the Football League Trophy)	0	4	0
Bristol City	2001–02	Second Division	0	0	—		0	0	0	0	0	0
Bristol City	Total		6	0	0	0	0	0	1	0	7	0
Forest Green Rovers (loan)	2001–02	Football Conference	6	1	2	0	—		—		8	1
Forest Green Rovers	2002–03	Football Conference	38	13	2	0	—		0	0	40	13
Forest Green Rovers	Total		44	14	4	0	—		0	0	48	14
Cheltenham Town	2003–04	Third Division	30	5	2	0	1	0	1	0	34	5
Cheltenham Town	2004–05	League Two	32	1	0	0	1	0	0	0	33	1
Cheltenham Town	2005–06	League Two	41	11	6	2	2	0	7 (Note: Four appearances in Football League Trophy, three in League Two play-offs)	0	56	13
Cheltenham Town	2006–07	League One	45	13	2	0	2	1	2	1	51	15
Cheltenham Town	Total		148	30	10	2	6	1	10	1	174	34
Barnsley	2007–08	Championship	39	3	4	1	1	0	—		44	4
Barnsley	2008–09	Championship	28	1	1	0	1	0	—		30	1
Barnsley	2009–10	Championship	5	0	—		2	0	—		7	0
Barnsley	Total		72	4	5	1	4	0	—		81	5
Scunthorpe United (loan)	2008–09	League One	6	1	—		—		—		6	1
Colchester United	2009–10	League One	28	9	4	1	—		—		32	10
Colchester United	2010–11	League One	44	4	3	0	2	0	1	0	50	4
Colchester United	2011–12	League One	43	4	2	0	1	1	1	0	47	5
Colchester United	Total		115	17	9	1	3	1	2	0	126	19
Rotherham United	2012–13	League Two	42	5	2	0	1	0	0	0	45	5
Rotherham United	2013–14	League One	0	0	—		0	0	—		0	0
Rotherham United	Total		42	5	2	0	1	0	0	0	45	5
Accrington Stanley (loan)	2013–14	League Two	32	8	1	0	—		—		33	8
Tranmere Rovers	2014–15	League Two	40	5	3	1	1	0	2	1	46	7
Stockport County	2015–16	National League North	40	6	0	0	—		0	0	40	6
Stockport County	2016–17	National League North	30	2	1	0	—		2 (Note: Appearances in the FA Trophy)	1	33	3
Stockport County	Total		70	8	1	0	0	0	2	1	73	9
Guiseley	2017–18	National League	18	1	3	0	—		0	0	21	1
Career total			593	93	38	5	15	2	17	3	663	103

=== International ===
As of match played 27 May 2008

Appearances and goals by national team and year
National team	Year	Apps	Goals
Nigeria	2008	1	0
Total		1	0

== Honours ==
Cheltenham Town

- Football League Two play-offs: 2006

Rotherham United

- Football League Two runner-up: 2012–13

Individual

- Colchester United Player of the Year: 2011–12
