= 2009–10 Colchester United F.C. season =

Colchester United
2009–10 season
- Owner: Robbie Cowling
- Chairman: Robbie Cowling
- Manager: Paul Lambert (until 18 August); Joe Dunne (caretaker) (18 August until 1 September); Aidy Boothroyd (from 2 September)
- Stadium: Colchester Community Stadium
- League One: 8th
- FA Cup: 3rd round (eliminated by Preston North End)
- League Cup: 1st round (eliminated by Leyton Orient)
- Football League Trophy: 1st round (southern section) (eliminated by Gillingham)
- Top goalscorer: League: Kevin Lisbie (13); All: Kevin Lisbie (13)
- Highest home attendance: 10,064 v Norwich City, 16 January 2010
- Lowest home attendance: 3,308 v Leyton Orient, 11 August 2009
- Average home league attendance: 5,437
- Biggest win: 7–1 v Norwich City, 8 August 2009
- Biggest defeat: 0–7 v Preston North End, 2 January 2010
Home colours	Away colours

The 2009–10 season was Colchester United's 68th season in their history and second successive season in the third tier of English football, League One. Alongside competing in the League One, the club also participated in the FA Cup, the League Cup and the Football League Trophy.

Following a famous 7–1 opening day win at Norwich City, manager Paul Lambert left Colchester for the Canaries under a storm surrounding compensation. Aidy Boothroyd was later appointed Lambert's successor and the club spent most of the season in the play-off positions. A late season collapse in form meant the U's dropped out of the play-offs with seven games remaining, but were not able to return, eventually finishing in eighth, eight points shy of the play-offs. Eighth place was still the fourth best-ever league result in the club's history.

In the cups, Colchester were eliminated in the first rounds of the League Cup and Football League Trophy, but progressed to the third round of the FA Cup. After beating Bromley and then Hereford United, Colchester faced Preston North End but were beaten 7–0 at Deepdale following five second half goals.

== Season overview ==
Paul Lambert vowed he would have a mass clear out of players over the summer as each player was called in to meet him to discuss their future before May was over. He had identified his transfer targets with chairman Robbie Cowling willing to fund those ambitions. Incoming were Ashley Vincent, following a loan spell last season, as well as Lee Beevers, David Fox, Magnus Okuonghae and Ben Williams, all on permanent deals. Outgoing was Mark Yeates, last season's top scorer, who joined Middlesbrough for £450,000.

Lambert's contracted outcasts were consigned to training with the youth team and denied squad numbers and a place in the squad photo. Chris Coyne left the club to return to his native Australia, while Jamie Guy, Matt Heath, Philip Ifil, Johnnie Jackson, Matt Lockwood and John White were all among those affected by Lambert's managerial tactics. He then brought in Hamilton Academical forward Joël Thomas in a long protracted transfer deal for £125,000.

Three days prior to the season opener against Norwich City, the club announced the signing of former striker Kevin Lisbie on loan from Ipswich Town. He scored twice on his second debut for the club as Colchester thrashed Norwich 7–1 at Carrow Road. A week later, Colchester remained at the top of League One following a 2–1 win over Yeovil Town. Norwich City contacted Robbie Cowling following the game asking to approach Lambert regarding their vacant manager position after they had sacked Bryan Gunn following the U's famous victory. Cowling initially refused, but later relented with Lambert declaring his interest in joining City. Cowling offered Lambert the chance to talk to Norwich on the proviso no offer could be accepted until compensation was discussed and agreed between the two clubs. Compensation was never agreed and Lambert resigned with Colchester due to host Gillingham the same day. Lambert's assistants Ian Culverhouse and Gary Karsa also resigned the day after his appointment at Norwich.

Cowling vowed to take Norwich to a Football League tribunal. In the meantime, former Watford manager Aidy Boothroyd was unveiled on 3 September as Lambert's replacement. He enjoyed a nine-game unbeaten run following his appointment, while making the loan signings of Danny Batth, Kayode Odejayi and John-Joe O'Toole. The latter two were then signed on a permanent basis in the January transfer window.

With the Lambert compensation issue still continuing into January, and with the U's set to host Lambert's Norwich in the league, Cowling refused to allocate additional tickets to the travelling Norwich fans for the fixture. Cowling claimed he would prefer the stadium have an empty seat than one occupied by another Norwich City fan. The game itself attracted a record attendance of 10,064, but Norwich gained revenge over the U's, winning 5–0 on the day.

At the end of February, Colchester's form took a negative turn, suffering an eight-game winless run and dropped from third place to seventh and outside of the play-off places for only the second time this season. With seven games remaining, Colchester were unable to make a return to the play-off spots and would eventually finish eighth, eight points away from the play-offs, yet a result that was their fourth best-ever league result.

Colchester were eliminated from the League Cup in the first round by Leyton Orient, while Gillingham beat the U's following a penalty shoot-out in the Football League Trophy. In the FA Cup, the U's beat Bromley and Hereford United on their way to the third round, but were heavily beaten 7–0 at Deepdale by Preston North End in the game prior to their 5–0 home defeat by Norwich.

== Players ==
As of match played 8 May 2010.

No.	Name	Position	Nationality	Place of birth	Date of birth	Apps	Goals	Signed from	Date signed	Fee
Goalkeepers
1	Ben Williams	GK	(England)	Manchester	27 August 1982 (aged 26)	0	0	(England) Carlisle United	10 July 2009	Undisclosed
12	Mark Cousins	GK	(England)	Chelmsford	9 January 1987 (aged 22)	15	0	Youth team	1 August 2004	Free transfer
Defenders
2	Alan Maybury	FB	(Republic of Ireland)	Dublin	8 August 1978 (aged 30)	26	0	(England) Leicester City	12 December 2008	Free transfer
3	Lee Beevers	RB	(Wales)	(England) Doncaster	4 December 1983 (aged 25)	0	0	(England) Lincoln City	26 June 2009	Free transfer
4	Magnus Okuonghae	CB	(England)	(Nigeria) Lagos	16 February 1986 (aged 23)	0	0	(England) Dagenham & Redbridge	1 July 2009	£60,000
5	Pat Baldwin	CB	(England)	City of London	12 November 1982 (aged 26)	215	1	(England) Chelsea	16 August 2002	Free transfer
6	Paul Reid	CB	(England)	Carlisle	18 February 1982 (aged 27)	29	1	(England) Barnsley	2 July 2008	Free transfer
23	Marc Tierney	FB	(England)	Prestwich	23 August 1985 (aged 23)	26	1	(England) Shrewsbury Town	2 January 2009	Undisclosed
25	John White	FB	(England)	Colchester	26 July 1986 (aged 22)	137	0	Youth team	1 July 2003	Free transfer
27	Matt Lockwood	LB	(England)	Rochford	17 October 1976 (aged 32)	5	0	(England) Nottingham Forest	3 June 2008	Free transfer
28	Matt Heath	CB	(England)	Leicester	1 November 1981 (aged 27)	26	1	(England) Leeds United	13 May 2008	Free transfer
30	Morten Knudsen	DF	(Norway)		27 October 1986 (aged 22)	0	0	(Norway) Notodden	20 January 2010	Undisclosed
31	Philip Ifil	RB	(England)	Willesden	18 January 1986 (aged 23)	30	0	(England) Tottenham Hotspur	10 January 2008	Undisclosed
34	Tom Bender	CB	(England)	Harlow	19 January 1993 (aged 16)	0	0	Youth team	1 July 2009	Free transfer
36	Bradley Hamilton	DF	(England)	Newham	30 August 1992 (aged 16)	0	0	Youth team	1 July 2009	Free transfer
Midfielders
8	John-Joe O'Toole	MF	(Republic of Ireland)	(England) Harrow	30 September 1988 (aged 20)	19	2	(England) Watford	1 January 2010	Undisclosed
10	Kemal Izzet	MF	(England)	Whitechapel	29 September 1980 (aged 28)	335	21	(England) Charlton Athletic	13 April 2001	Free transfer
14	David Fox	MF	(England)	Leek	13 December 1983 (aged 25)	0	0	(England) Blackpool	1 July 2009	Free transfer
17	David Perkins	MF	(England)	Heysham	21 June 1982 (aged 26)	43	6	(England) Rochdale	8 July 2008	Undisclosed
22	Anthony Wordsworth	MF	(England)	Camden Town	3 January 1989 (aged 20)	40	3	Youth team	1 July 2006	Free transfer
26	David Prutton	MF	(England)	Kingston upon Hull	12 September 1981 (aged 27)	1	1	(England) Leeds United	1 February 2010	Free transfer
32	Sam Corcoran	MF	(England)	Enfield Town	5 February 1991 (aged 18)	1	0	Youth team	31 March 2009	Free transfer
Forwards
7	Ashley Vincent	WG	(England)	Oldbury	26 May 1985 (aged 24)	6	1	(England) Cheltenham Town	1 July 2009	Free transfer
9	Clive Platt	FW	(England)	Wolverhampton	27 October 1977 (aged 31)	90	18	(England) Milton Keynes Dons	3 July 2007	£300,000
11	Simon Hackney	WG	(England)	Manchester	5 February 1984 (aged 25)	17	0	(England) Carlisle United	26 January 2009	£100,000
15	Kayode Odejayi	FW	(Nigeria)	Ibadan	21 February 1982 (aged 27)	17	7	(England) Barnsley	1 January 2010	Undisclosed
16	Ian Henderson	FW/MF	(England)	Bury St Edmunds	24 January 1985 (aged 24)	0	0	(Turkey) Ankaragücü	7 January 2010	Free transfer
18	Steven Gillespie	FW	(England)	Liverpool	4 June 1985 (aged 23)	20	5	(England) Cheltenham Town	7 July 2008	£400,000
19	Joël Thomas	FW	(France)	Caen	30 June 1987 (aged 21)	0	0	(Scotland) Hamilton Academical	21 July 2009	£125,000
29	Scott Vernon	FW	(England)	Manchester	13 December 1983 (aged 25)	64	10	(England) Blackpool	31 January 2008	Undisclosed
33	Russell Malton	FW/MF	(England)	Colchester	14 November 1990 (aged 18)	0	0	Youth team	1 July 2009	Free transfer
35	Craig Arnott	FW	(England)	Edgware	9 September 1992 (aged 16)	0	0	Youth team	1 July 2009	Free transfer
39	Medy Elito	WG	(England)	(Zaire) Kinshasa	20 March 1990 (aged 19)	19	1	Youth team	1 July 2007	Free transfer

== Transfers ==
=== In ===
Date	Position	Nationality	Name	From	Fee	Ref.
29 June 2009	RB	(Wales)	Lee Beevers	(England) Lincoln City	Free transfer	
1 July 2009	FW	(England)	Craig Arnott	Youth team	Free transfer	
1 July 2009	CB	(Wales)	Tom Bender	Youth team	Free transfer	
1 July 2009	MF	(England)	David Fox	(England) Blackpool	Free transfer	
1 July 2009	DF	(England)	Bradley Hamilton	Youth team	Free transfer	
1 July 2009	FW/MF	(England)	Russell Malton	Youth team	Free transfer	
1 July 2009	CB	(England)	Magnus Okuonghae	(England) Dagenham & Redbridge	£60,000	
1 July 2009	WG	(England)	Ashley Vincent	(England) Cheltenham Town	Free transfer	
10 July 2009	GK	(England)	Ben Williams	(England) Carlisle United	Undisclosed	
21 July 2009	FW	(France)	Joël Thomas	(Scotland) Hamilton Academical	£125,000	
24 July 2009	MF	(Scotland)	Gary Holt	(England) Wycombe Wanderers	Free transfer	
1 January 2010	FW	(Nigeria)	Kayode Odejayi	(England) Barnsley	Undisclosed	
1 January 2010	MF	(Republic of Ireland)	John-Joe O'Toole	(England) Watford	Undisclosed	
7 January 2010	FW/MF	(England)	Ian Henderson	(Turkey) Ankaragücü	Free transfer	
20 January 2010	DF	(Norway)	Morten Knudsen	(Norway) Notodden	Undisclosed	
1 February 2010	MF	(England)	David Prutton	(England) Leeds United	Free transfer	

- Total spending: ▼ ~ £185,000

=== Out ===
Date	Position	Nationality	Name	To	Fee	Ref.
26 June 2009	WG	(Republic of Ireland)	Mark Yeates	(England) Middlesbrough	£450,000	
30 June 2009	CB	(Australia)	Chris Coyne	(Australia) Perth Glory	Released	
30 June 2009	FW	(Nigeria)	Akanni-Sunday Wasiu	(Malta) Floriana	Released	
1 July 2009	GK	(England)	Dean Gerken	(England) Bristol City	Undisclosed	
17 August 2009	MF	(England)	Johnnie Jackson	(England) Notts County	Undisclosed	
19 August 2009	MF	(England)	Dean Hammond	(England) Southampton	£400,000	
22 September 2009	MF	(Scotland)	Gary Holt	(England) Lowestoft Town	Released	
19 January 2010	FW	(England)	Jamie Guy	(England) Grays Athletic	Released	

- Total incoming: ▲ ~ £850,000

=== Loans in ===
Date	Position	Nationality	Name	From	End date	Ref.
3 August 2009	FW	(Jamaica)	Kevin Lisbie	(England) Ipswich Town	31 May 2010	
1 September 2009	MF	(Republic of Ireland)	John-Joe O'Toole	(England) Watford	31 December 2009	
16 September 2009	FW	(Nigeria)	Kayode Odejayi	(England) Barnsley	31 December 2009	
17 September 2009	CB	(England)	Danny Batth	(England) Wolverhampton Wanderers	29 April 2010	
23 October 2009	MF	(England)	Josh Payne	(England) West Ham United	15 November 2009	
22 January 2010	FB	(Wales)	Christian Ribeiro	(England) Bristol City	21 February 2010	
25 January 2010	MF	(England)	David Prutton	(England) Leeds United	31 January 2010	
25 March 2010	LB	(France)	Franck Queudrue	(England) Birmingham City	25 March 2010	

=== Loans out ===
Date	Position	Nationality	Name	To	End date	Ref.
30 July 2009	CB	(England)	Matt Heath	(England) Southend United	30 August 2009	
30 July 2009	FB	(England)	John White	(England) Southend United	30 August 2009	
2 October 2009	MF	(England)	David Perkins	(England) Chesterfield	2 January 2010	
6 October 2009	FW	(England)	Jamie Guy	(England) Port Vale	17 November 2009	
30 October 2009	LB	(England)	Matt Lockwood	(England) Dagenham & Redbridge	30 November 2009	
20 November 2009	CB	(England)	Pat Baldwin	(England) Bristol Rovers	31 December 2009	
4 December 2009	MF	(England)	Sam Corcoran	(England) Wealdstone	4 January 2010	
18 January 2010	MF	(England)	David Perkins	(England) Stockport County	31 May 2010	
22 January 2010	LB	(England)	Matt Lockwood	(England) Barnet	31 May 2010	
29 January 2010	CB	(England)	Pat Baldwin	(England) Southend United	1 June 2010	
29 January 2010	FW	(France)	Joël Thomas	(Scotland) Hamilton Academical	31 May 2010	
5 March 2010	WG	(England)	Medy Elito	(England) Cheltenham Town	1 June 2010	
9 March 2010	WG	(England)	Simon Hackney	(England) Morecambe	15 April 2010	

== Match details ==
=== Pre-season friendly ===
21 July 2009 Friendly	Colchester United	2–2	Aston Villa	Colchester
19:45 BST	Vernon 25'; Vincent 56'	Report	Sidwell 63'; McGurk 73'	Stadium: Colchester Community Stadium; Attendance: 4,164; Referee: Trevor Kettle

=== League One ===
==== League table ====
Pos	Team	Pld	W	D	L	GF	GA	GD	Pts	Promotion, qualification or relegation
6	Huddersfield Town	46	23	11	12	82	56	+26	80	Qualification for League One play-offs
7	Southampton	46	23	14	9	85	47	+38	73 (Note: Southampton were given a ten-point deduction for breaching insolvency regulations, regarding their holding company. As they finished in the bottom three last season, the points deduction were applied in the 2009–10 season.)	
8	Colchester United	46	20	12	14	64	52	+12	72	
9	Brentford	46	14	20	12	55	52	+3	62	
10	Walsall	46	16	14	16	60	63	−3	62	

Source: The Football League
Rules for classification: 1) points; 2) goal difference; 3) number of goals scored.

==== Results round by round ====
Round	1	2	3	4	5	6	7	8	9	10	11	12	13	14	15	16	17	18	19	20	21	22	23	24	25	26	27	28	29	30	31	32	33	34	35	36	37	38	39	40	41	42	43	44	45	46
Ground	A	H	H	A	H	A	A	H	A	H	H	A	A	H	A	H	A	H	A	H	A	A	H	H	A	H	A	H	H	A	A	H	A	H	A	A	H	H	A	H	H	A	A	H	A	H
Result	W	W	W	L	L	D	D	W	D	W	W	W	D	W	L	D	D	W	L	W	W	W	W	L	D	W	L	W	W	D	W	W	L	D	L	L	D	D	L	L	W	L	L	D	L	W
Position	1	1	1	3	5	7	6	5	5	4	4	3	4	3	4	3	4	3	4	4	3	4	4	4	4	4	4	4	4	4	3	3	4	4	5	6	6	6	6	7	7	7	7	8	8	8

Source: Statto.com (archived)
A = Away; H = Home; W = Win; D = Draw; L = Loss

==== Matches ====
8 August 2009 1	Norwich City	1–7	Colchester United	Norwich
15:00 BST	McDonald 72'	Report	Lisbie 10', 38'; Platt 13', 19'; Fox 22'; Perkins 76'; Vernon 90'	Stadium: Carrow Road; Attendance: 25,217; Referee: Rob Shoebridge

15 August 2009 2	Colchester United	2–1	Yeovil Town	Colchester
15:00 BST	Fox 8'; Vincent 18'	Report	Mason 82'	Stadium: Colchester Community Stadium; Attendance: 4,263; Referee: R Booth

18 August 2009 3	Colchester United	2–1	Gillingham	Colchester
19:45 BST	Vernon 38'; Lisbie 66'	Report	Weston 11'	Stadium: Colchester Community Stadium; Attendance: 4,849; Referee: Grant Hegley

22 August 2009 4	Milton Keynes Dons	2–1	Colchester United	Milton Keynes
15:00 BST	Easter 22' (pen.); Carrington 58'	Report	Vernon 69'	Stadium: Stadium MK; Attendance: 8,633; Referee: Keith Stroud

29 August 2009 5	Colchester United	1–2	Leeds United	Colchester
15:00 BST	Lisbie 57' (pen.)	Report	Johnson 47'; Beckford 64'	Stadium: Colchester Community Stadium; Attendance: 8,810; Referee: David Phillips

5 September 2009 6	Southampton	0–0	Colchester United	Southampton
15:00 BST		Report	Izzet (red card) 36'	Stadium: St Mary's Stadium; Attendance: 17,070; Referee: Graham Scott

12 September 2009 7	Swindon Town	1–1	Colchester United	Swindon
15:00 BST	Obadeyi 45'	Report	Vincent 21'	Stadium: County Ground; Attendance: 6,621; Referee: Karl Evans

19 September 2009 8	Colchester United	2–0	Hartlepool United	Colchester
15:00 BST	Lisbie 45' (pen.), 47'	Report		Stadium: Colchester Community Stadium; Attendance: 4,259; Referee: Andy Woolmer

26 September 2009 9	Tranmere Rovers	1–1	Colchester United	Birkenhead
15:00 BST	Welsh 35'	Report	O'Toole 37'	Stadium: Prenton Park; Attendance: 5,314; Referee: Steve Bratt

29 September 2009 10	Colchester United	3–0	Charlton Athletic	Colchester
19:45 BST	Llera 29' (o.g.); Odejayi 31', 57'	Report		Stadium: Colchester Community Stadium; Attendance: 7,098; Referee: Mick Russell

3 October 2009 11	Colchester United	1–0	Huddersfield Town	Colchester
15:00 BST	Odejayi 80'	Report	P. Clarke (yellow card) 77' (red card)	Stadium: Colchester Community Stadium; Attendance: 5,154; Referee: Gavin Ward

10 October 2009 12	Leyton Orient	0–1	Colchester United	Leyton
15:00 BST		Report	Odejayi 54'	Stadium: Brisbane Road; Attendance: 5,410; Referee: Danny McDermid

17 October 2009 13	Wycombe Wanderers	1–1	Colchester United	High Wycombe
15:00 BST	Pittman 87'	Report	Odejayi 23'	Stadium: Adams Park; Attendance: 5,394; Referee: Chris Sarginson

24 October 2009 14	Colchester United	2–1	Walsall	Colchester
15:00 BST	Lisbie 26', 61' (pen.)	Report	Byfield 28'	Stadium: Colchester Community Stadium; Attendance: 4,880; Referee: Roger East

31 October 2009 15	Millwall	2–1	Colchester United	Bermondsey
15:00 GMT	Dunne 66'; Henry 90'	Report	Wordsworth 18'	Stadium: The Den; Attendance: 10,036; Referee: Graham Horwood

14 November 2009 16	Colchester United	2–2	Exeter City	Colchester
15:00 GMT	Platt 41', 85'; Elito (red card) 89'	Report	Fleetwood 6'; Harley 45'	Stadium: Colchester Community Stadium; Attendance: 5,208; Referee: Paul Taylor

21 November 2009 17	Oldham Athletic	2–2	Colchester United	Oldham
15:00 GMT	Taylor 63' (pen.); Brooke 88'	Report	Fox 12'; Odejayi 50'; Tierney (yellow card) 56' (red card)	Stadium: Boundary Park; Attendance: 3,607; Referee: Eddie Ilderton

24 November 2009 18	Colchester United	2–0	Stockport County	Colchester
19:45 GMT	Lisbie 10'; Platt 15'	Report		Stadium: Colchester Community Stadium; Attendance: 3,818; Referee: Phil Gibbs

1 December 2009 19	Brentford	1–0	Colchester United	Brentford
19:45 GMT	MacDonald 15'	Report		Stadium: Griffin Park; Attendance: 4,200; Referee: Graham Scott

5 December 2009 20	Colchester United	1–0	Bristol Rovers	Colchester
15:00 GMT	Lisbie 30'	Report		Stadium: Colchester Community Stadium; Attendance: 4,942; Referee: Trevor Kettle

11 December 2009 21	Brighton & Hove Albion	1–2	Colchester United	Brighton
19:45 GMT	Dicker 42'	Report	Ifil 9'; Wordsworth 14'	Stadium: Withdean Stadium; Attendance: 5,898; Referee: Steve Tanner

19 December 2009	Colchester United	P–P	Carlisle United	Colchester
15:00 GMT		Report		Stadium: Colchester Community Stadium

26 December 2009 22	Southend United	1–2	Colchester United	Southend-on-Sea
13:00 GMT	Barnard 76'	Report	Ifil 46'; Wordsworth 57'	Stadium: Roots Hall; Attendance: 10,329; Referee: Grant Hegley

28 December 2009 23	Colchester United	2–1	Southampton	Colchester
15:00 GMT	Wordsworth 23'; Gillespie 75'	Report	Lambert 90' (pen.)	Stadium: Colchester Community Stadium; Attendance: 8,514; Referee: Darren Deadman

9 January 2010	Yeovil Town	P–P	Colchester United	Yeovil
15:00 GMT		Report		Stadium: Huish Park

16 January 2010 24	Colchester United	0–5	Norwich City	Colchester
15:00 GMT	Henderson (red card) 90'	Report	Martin 16', 45'; Doherty 49'; Johnson 81'; Holt 90'	Stadium: Colchester Community Stadium; Attendance: 10,064; Referee: Mike Dean

23 January 2010 25	Gillingham	0–0	Colchester United	Gillingham
15:00 GMT		Report		Stadium: Priestfield Stadium; Attendance: 4,948; Referee: Oliver Langford

26 January 2010 26	Colchester United	2–0	Milton Keynes Dons	Colchester
19:45 GMT	Lisbie 18'; Prutton 67'	Report	Stirling (red card) 53'	Stadium: Colchester Community Stadium; Attendance: 3,601; Referee: Simon Hooper

30 January 2010 27	Leeds United	2–0	Colchester United	Leeds
	Beckford 38' (pen.), 55'	Report		Stadium: Elland Road; Attendance: 23,425; Referee: Andy Woolmer

2 February 2010 28	Colchester United	2–1	Carlisle United	Colchester
19:45 GMT	Platt 61'; Odejayi 90+3'	Report	Harte 24'	Stadium: Colchester Community Stadium; Attendance: 3,903; Referee: Gary Sutton

8 February 2010 29	Colchester United	2–0	Southend United	Colchester
19:45 GMT	Wordsworth 3', 62'	Report		Stadium: Colchester Community Stadium; Attendance: 6,466; Referee: Nigel Miller

13 February 2010 30	Stockport County	2–2	Colchester United	Stockport
15:00 GMT	Ibehre 22', 77'	Report	Prutton 10'; Wordsworth 18'	Stadium: Edgeley Park; Attendance: 3,642; Referee: Andy Haines

16 February 2010 31	Yeovil Town	0–1	Colchester United	Yeovil
19:45 GMT		Report	Odejayi 38'	Stadium: Huish Park; Attendance: 3,469; Referee: Darren Sheldrake

20 February 2010 32	Colchester United	1–0	Oldham Athletic	Colchester
15:00 GMT	Batth 64'	Report		Stadium: Colchester Community Stadium; Attendance: 5,321; Referee: James Linington

23 February 2010	Colchester United	P–P	Brentford	Colchester
		Report		Stadium: Colchester Community Stadium

27 February 2010 33	Bristol Rovers	3–2	Colchester United	Bristol
15:00 GMT	Blizzard 16'; Kuffour 67'; Lines 79'	Report	O'Toole 21'; Odejayi 89'	Stadium: Memorial Stadium; Attendance: 6,023; Referee: Oliver Langford

8 March 2010 34	Colchester United	0–0	Brighton & Hove Albion	Colchester
19:45 GMT		Report		Stadium: Colchester Community Stadium; Attendance: 3,914; Referee: Anthony Bates

13 March 2010 35	Carlisle United	2–1	Colchester United	Carlisle
15:00 GMT	Marshall 68'; Price 73'; Taiwo (yellow card) 42' (red card)	Report	Platt 66'	Stadium: Brunton Park; Attendance: 4,469; Referee: Jock Waugh

20 March 2010 36	Walsall	1–0	Colchester United	Walsall
15:00 GMT	Byfield 90'; Hughes (red card) 45'	Report		Stadium: Bescot Stadium; Attendance: 3,510; Referee: Geoff Eltringham

23 March 2010 37	Colchester United	3–3	Brentford	Colchester
19:45 GMT	Hunt 32' (o.g.); Wordsworth 45'; Prutton 76'	Report	Hunt 13'; Legge 17'; MacDonald 57'	Stadium: Colchester Community Stadium; Attendance: 3,915; Referee: Fred Graham

27 March 2010 38	Colchester United	1–1	Wycombe Wanderers	Colchester
15:00 GMT	Henderson 59'	Report	Ainsworth 90'	Stadium: Colchester Community Stadium; Attendance: 5,593; Referee: S Cook

2 April 2010 39	Exeter City	2–0	Colchester United	Exeter
15:00 BST	Fleetwood 33'; Harley 90'	Report		Stadium: St James Park; Attendance: 6,297; Referee: Phil Gibbs

5 April 2010 40	Colchester United	1–2	Millwall	Colchester
13:00 BST	Lisbie 50'	Report	Morison 43'; Batth 78' (o.g.)	Stadium: Colchester Community Stadium; Attendance: 7,393; Referee: Andy D'Urso

10 April 2010 41	Colchester United	3–0	Swindon Town	Colchester
15:00 BST	Vincent 24'; Wordsworth 69', 90'	Report		Stadium: Colchester Community Stadium; Attendance: 5,111; Referee: Andy Penn

13 April 2010 42	Charlton Athletic	1–0	Colchester United	Charlton
19:45 BST	Forster 21'	Report	Lisbie (yellow card) 90+2' (red card)	Stadium: The Valley; Attendance: 17,247; Referee: Mike Jones

17 April 2010 43	Hartlepool United	3–1	Colchester United	Hartlepool
15:00 BST	Brown 11'; O'Donovan 19', 85' (pen.)	Report	Henderson 8'	Stadium: Victoria Park; Attendance: 3,126; Referee: Jonathan Moss

24 April 2010 44	Colchester United	1–1	Tranmere Rovers	Colchester
15:00 BST	Wordsworth 4'; Prutton (yellow card) 90' (red card)	Report	Thomas-Moore 6'	Stadium: Colchester Community Stadium; Attendance: 4,353; Referee: P Crossley

1 May 2010 45	Huddersfield Town	2–1	Colchester United	Huddersfield
15:00 BST	Robinson 17' (pen.); Novak 90+5'	Report	Hackney 76'	Stadium: Kirklees Stadium; Attendance: 17,950; Referee: Keith Stroud

8 May 2010 46	Colchester United	1–0	Leyton Orient	Colchester
15:00 BST	Lisbie 90' (pen.)	Report	Ashworth (red card) 90'	Stadium: Colchester Community Stadium; Attendance: 5,751; Referee: Dean Whitestone

=== Football League Cup ===
11 August 2009 1st round	Colchester United	1–2	Leyton Orient	Colchester
19:45 BST	Hackney 90'; Platt (red card) 90'	Report	Pătulea 2'; Melligan 63'	Stadium: Colchester Community Stadium; Attendance: 3,308; Referee: Darren Deadman

=== Football League Trophy ===
1 September 2009 1st round (southern section)	Gillingham	1–1 (4–3 p)	Colchester United	Gillingham
19:45 BST	Jackson 77' (pen.)	Report; Report (archived)	Platt 84'	Stadium: Priestfield Stadium; Attendance: 1,725; Referee: Dean Whitestone
	Penalties
	Jackson (penalty scored); Miller (penalty missed); Palmer (penalty scored); Weston (penalty scored); McCammon (penalty scored)		Vernon (penalty scored); Wordsworth (penalty scored); Fox (penalty missed); Lockwood (penalty scored); Perkins (penalty missed)

=== FA Cup ===
7 November 2009 1st round	Bromley	0–4	Colchester United	Bromley
13:00 GMT		Report	Hackney 32'; Odejayi 35'; Platt 71'; Gillespie 89'	Stadium: Hayes Lane; Attendance: 4,242; Referee: David Phillips

28 November 2009 2nd round	Hereford United	0–1	Colchester United	Hereford
15:00 GMT		Report	O'Toole 90'	Stadium: Edgar Street; Attendance: 2,225; Referee: Neil Swarbrick

2 January 2010 3rd round	Preston North End	7–0	Colchester United	Preston
15:00 GMT	Brown 13'; Sedgwick 27'; Parkin 48', 50', 72' (pen.); Williams 52' (o.g.); Carter 64'	Report		Stadium: Deepdale; Attendance: 7,621; Referee: Colin Webster

== Squad statistics ==
=== Appearances and goals ===
No.	Pos	Nat	Player	Total		League One		FA Cup		League Cup		Football League Trophy	
No.	Pos	Nat	Player	Apps	Goals	Apps	Goals	Apps	Goals	Apps	Goals	Apps	Goals
1	GK	(England) ENG	Ben Williams	49	0	46	0	3	0	0	0	0	0
2	DF	(Republic of Ireland) IRL	Alan Maybury	3	0	1+1	0	0	0	1	0	0	0
3	DF	(Wales) WAL	Lee Beevers	5	0	4	0	0	0	1	0	0	0
4	DF	(England) ENG	Magnus Okuonghae	49	0	44	0	3	0	1	0	1	0
5	DF	(England) ENG	Pat Baldwin	8	0	6+1	0	0	0	1	0	0	0
6	DF	(England) ENG	Paul Reid	14	0	10+2	0	2	0	0	0	0	0
7	FW	(England) ENG	Ashley Vincent	21	3	15+4	3	0	0	1	0	1	0
8	MF	(Republic of Ireland) IRL	John-Joe O'Toole	33	3	30+1	2	2	1	0	0	0	0
9	FW	(England) ENG	Clive Platt	45	9	36+5	7	1+1	1	1	0	1	1
10	MF	(England) ENG	Kemal Izzet	41	0	31+6	0	1+1	0	1	0	1	0
11	FW	(England) ENG	Simon Hackney	22	3	9+8	1	3	1	1	1	1	0
12	GK	(England) ENG	Mark Cousins	2	0	0	0	0	0	1	0	1	0
14	MF	(England) ENG	David Fox	21	3	15+3	3	2	0	0	0	1	0
15	FW	(Nigeria) NGA	Kayode Odejayi	31	10	19+9	9	3	1	0	0	0	0
16	FW	(England) ENG	Ian Henderson	13	2	6+7	2	0	0	0	0	0	0
17	MF	(England) ENG	David Perkins	7	1	0+5	1	0	0	1	0	0+1	0
18	FW	(England) ENG	Steven Gillespie	33	2	8+22	1	2+1	1	0	0	0	0
19	FW	(France) FRA	Joël Thomas	7	0	0+4	0	0+2	0	0	0	0+1	0
22	MF	(England) ENG	Anthony Wordsworth	44	11	36+5	11	1+1	0	0	0	0+1	0
23	DF	(England) ENG	Marc Tierney	44	0	41	0	3	0	0	0	0	0
25	DF	(England) ENG	John White	43	0	38+1	0	3	0	0	0	1	0
26	MF	(England) ENG	David Prutton	19	3	18+1	3	0	0	0	0	0	0
27	DF	(England) ENG	Matt Lockwood	2	0	1	0	0	0	0	0	1	0
28	DF	(England) ENG	Matt Heath	19	0	13+5	0	0	0	0	0	1	0
29	FW	(England) ENG	Scott Vernon	9	3	4+3	3	0	0	0+1	0	1	0
31	DF	(England) ENG	Philip Ifil	30	2	15+12	2	2+1	0	0	0	0	0
34	DF	(Wales) WAL	Tom Bender	1	0	0+1	0	0	0	0	0	0	0
39	FW	(England) ENG	Medy Elito	4	0	0+3	0	0+1	0	0	0	0	0
Players who appeared for Colchester who left during the season
8	MF	(England) ENG	Dean Hammond	3	0	2	0	0	0	0+1	0	0	0
16	MF	(England) ENG	Josh Payne	3	0	2+1	0	0	0	0	0	0	0
20	FW	(Jamaica) JAM	Kevin Lisbie	43	13	35+6	13	1	0	1	0	0	0
21	DF	(England) ENG	Danny Batth	18	1	16+1	1	1	0	0	0	0	0
24	DF	(France) FRA	Franck Queudrue	3	0	3	0	0	0	0	0	0	0
24	DF	(Wales) WAL	Christian Ribeiro	2	0	2	0	0	0	0	0	0	0
30	FW	(England) ENG	Jamie Guy	1	0	0+1	0	0	0	0	0	0	0

=== Goalscorers ===
Place	Number	Nationality	Position	Name	League One	FA Cup	League Cup	Football League Trophy	Total
1	20	(Jamaica)	FW	Kevin Lisbie	13	0	0	0	13
2	22	(England)	MF	Anthony Wordsworth	11	0	0	0	11
3	15	(Nigeria)	FW	Kayode Odejayi	9	1	0	0	10
4	9	(England)	FW	Clive Platt	7	1	0	1	9
5	7	(England)	WG	Ashley Vincent	3	0	0	0	3
5	8	(Republic of Ireland)	MF	John-Joe O'Toole	2	1	0	0	3
5	11	(England)	WG	Simon Hackney	1	1	1	0	3
5	14	(England)	MF	David Fox	3	0	0	0	3
5	26	(England)	MF	David Prutton	3	0	0	0	3
5	29	(England)	FW	Scott Vernon	3	0	0	0	3
11	16	(England)	FW/MF	Ian Henderson	2	0	0	0	2
11	18	(England)	FW	Steven Gillespie	1	1	0	0	2
11	31	(England)	RB	Philip Ifil	2	0	0	0	2
14	17	(England)	MF	David Perkins	1	0	0	0	1
14	21	(England)	CB	Danny Batth	1	0	0	0	1
				Own goals	2	0	0	0	2
				TOTALS	64	5	1	1	71

=== Disciplinary record ===
Number	Nationality	Position	Name	League One		FA Cup		League Cup		Football League Trophy		Total	
Number	Nationality	Position	Name	Booked	Sent off (straight red)	Booked	Sent off (straight red)	Booked	Sent off (straight red)	Booked	Sent off (straight red)	Booked	Sent off (straight red)
10	(England)	MF	Kemal Izzet	10	1	1	0	0	0	1	0	12	1
23	(England)	FB	Marc Tierney	9	1	0	0	0	0	0	0	9	1
20	(Jamaica)	FW	Kevin Lisbie	8	1	0	0	0	0	0	0	8	1
8	(Republic of Ireland)	MF	John-Joe O'Toole	8	0	2	0	0	0	0	0	10	0
22	(England)	MF	Anthony Wordsworth	9	0	0	0	0	0	1	0	10	0
26	(England)	MF	David Prutton	7	1	0	0	0	0	0	0	7	1
9	(England)	FW	Clive Platt	4	0	0	0	0	1	0	0	4	1
25	(England)	FB	John White	5	0	0	0	0	0	0	0	5	0
7	(England)	WG	Ashley Vincent	4	0	0	0	0	0	0	0	4	0
16	(England)	FW/MF	Ian Henderson	1	1	0	0	0	0	0	0	1	1
21	(England)	CB	Danny Batth	4	0	0	0	0	0	0	0	4	0
4	(England)	CB	Magnus Okuonghae	2	0	1	0	0	0	0	0	3	0
11	(England)	WG	Simon Hackney	3	0	0	0	0	0	0	0	3	0
18	(England)	FW	Steven Gillespie	3	0	0	0	0	0	0	0	3	0
39	(England)	WG	Medy Elito	0	1	0	0	0	0	0	0	0	1
6	(England)	CB	Paul Reid	2	0	0	0	0	0	0	0	2	0
1	(England)	GK	Ben Williams	1	0	0	0	0	0	0	0	1	0
2	(Republic of Ireland)	FB	Alan Maybury	1	0	0	0	0	0	0	0	1	0
14	(England)	MF	David Fox	1	0	0	0	0	0	0	0	1	0
16	(England)	MF	Josh Payne	1	0	0	0	0	0	0	0	1	0
17	(England)	MF	David Perkins	1	0	0	0	0	0	0	0	1	0
19	(France)	FW	Joël Thomas	0	0	1	0	0	0	0	0	1	0
31	(England)	RB	Philip Ifil	1	0	0	0	0	0	0	0	1	0
			TOTALS	85	6	5	0	0	1	2	0	92	7

=== Captains ===
Number of games played as team captain.

Place	Number	Nationality	Position	Player	League One	FA Cup	League Cup	Football League Trophy	Total
1	4	(England)	CB	Magnus Okuonghae	36	3	0	0	39
2	5	(England)	CB	Pat Baldwin	4	0	0	0	4
3	9	(England)	FW	Clive Platt	2	0	0	1	3
3	8	(England)	MF	Dean Hammond	2	0	0	0	2
3	10	(England)	MF	Kemal Izzet	1	0	1	0	2
5	15	(Nigeria)	FW	Kayode Odejayi	1	0	0	0	1
				TOTALS	46	3	1	1	51

=== Clean sheets ===
Number of games goalkeepers kept a clean sheet.

Place	Number	Nationality	Player	League One	FA Cup	League Cup	Football League Trophy	Total
1	1	(England)	Ben Williams	15	2	0	0	17
			TOTALS	15	2	0	0	17

=== Player debuts ===
Players making their first-team Colchester United debut in a fully competitive match.

Number	Position	Nationality	Player	Date	Opponent	Ground	Notes
1	GK	(England)	Ben Williams	8 August 2009	Norwich City	Carrow Road	
3	RB	(Wales)	Lee Beevers	8 August 2009	Norwich City	Carrow Road	
4	CB	(England)	Magnus Okuonghae	8 August 2009	Norwich City	Carrow Road	
7	WG	(England)	Ashley Vincent	8 August 2009	Norwich City	Carrow Road	(Note: Second debut for the club)
14	MF	(England)	David Fox	8 August 2009	Norwich City	Carrow Road	
20	FW	(Jamaica)	Kevin Lisbie	8 August 2009	Norwich City	Carrow Road	
19	FW	(France)	Joël Thomas	18 August 2009	Gillingham	Colchester Community Stadium	
8	MF	(Republic of Ireland)	John-Joe O'Toole	5 September 2009	Southampton	St Mary's Stadium	
15	FW	(Nigeria)	Kayode Odejayi	19 September 2009	Hartlepool United	Colchester Community Stadium	
21	CB	(England)	Danny Batth	19 September 2009	Hartlepool United	Colchester Community Stadium	
34	CB	(Wales)	Tom Bender	19 September 2009	Hartlepool United	Colchester Community Stadium	
16	MF	(England)	Josh Payne	24 October 2009	Walsall	Colchester Community Stadium	
15	FW	(Nigeria)	Kayode Odejayi	2 January 2010	Preston North End	Deepdale	
16	FW/MF	(England)	Ian Henderson	16 January 2010	Norwich City	Colchester Community Stadium	
8	MF	(Republic of Ireland)	John-Joe O'Toole	23 January 2010	Gillingham	Priestfield Stadium	
24	FB	(Wales)	Christian Ribeiro	23 January 2010	Gillingham	Priestfield Stadium	
26	MF	(England)	David Prutton	26 January 2010	Milton Keynes Dons	Colchester Community Stadium	
26	MF	(England)	David Prutton	2 February 2010	Carlisle United	Colchester Community Stadium	
24	LB	(France)	Franck Queudrue	27 March 2010	Wycombe Wanderers	Colchester Community Stadium	

== See also ==
- List of Colchester United F.C. seasons
