= John White (footballer, born 1986) =

English footballer, born 1986

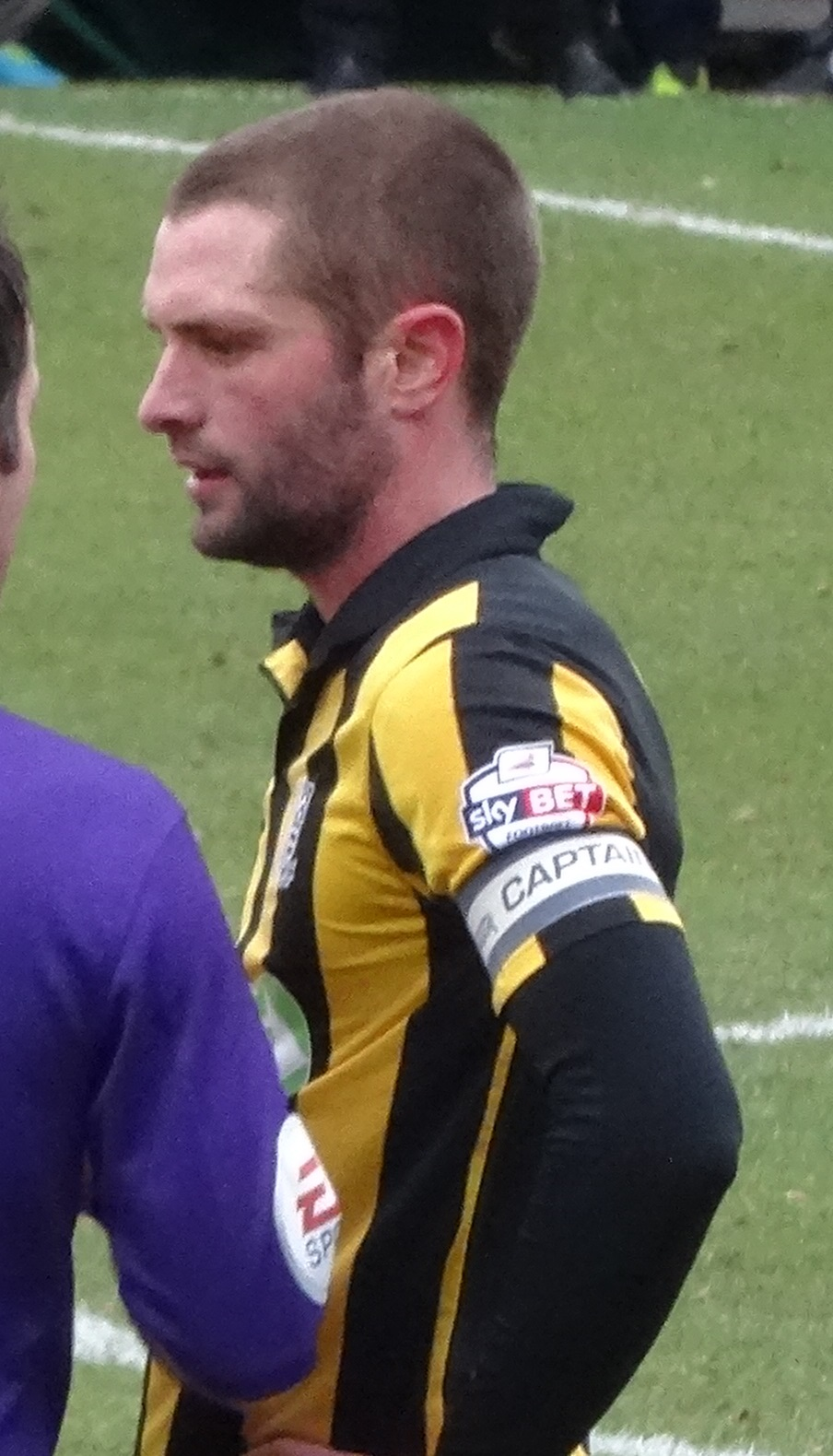
- White playing for Southend United in 2014

Personal information
- Full name: John Alan White
- Date of birth: 26 July 1986 (age 40)
- Place of birth: Rochford, England
- Height: 6 ft 0 in (1.83 m)
- Position: Defender

Youth career
- 1997–1998: Norwich City
- 1998–2004: Colchester United

Senior career*
Years	Team	Apps	(Gls)
2004–2013	Colchester United	227	(0)
2007	→ Stevenage Borough (loan)	4	(0)
2009	→ Southend United (loan)	5	(0)
2013–2022	Southend United	243	(8)
2022	→ Wimborne Town (loan)	11	(1)
2022–2023	Braintree Town	45	(1)
Total		535	(10)
- * Club domestic league appearances and goals as of 17:42, 22 November 2023 (UTC)

John Alan White (born 26 July 1986) is an English former footballer who played as a defender and was most recently assistant manager at Chelmsford City. He previously played in the Football League for Colchester United and Southend United, where he made over 200 league appearances for both sides.

== Career ==
=== Colchester United ===
White rose through the youth ranks at hometown club, Colchester United, having joined the U's at the age of eleven. He was eventually handed his first team debut by Phil Parkinson in a League Cup tie at home to Cheltenham Town in August 2004, before retaining his place for his Football League debut four days later in a 4–1 win over Doncaster Rovers.

He went on to make 24 appearances for the U's during the remainder of the 2004–05 season and displayed his versatility by covering a number of positions, proving to be particularly effective in a man-marking role that had been assigned to him by Parkinson.

White then played an important role the following season as the U's won promotion to the Championship. Having established himself as a first-team regular, he made 41 appearances in all competitions as Parkinson's side finished second in League One, as well as enjoying a run to the fifth round of the FA Cup where they were beaten 3–1 by Chelsea at Stamford Bridge, a game in which White played the full 90 minutes.

In June 2007, White was offered an improved contract to remain at Layer Road, but after making only a handful of appearances in the opening months of the season, he moved to Stevenage in a month-long loan deal. The spell revitalised White and, with George Elokobi falling out of favour at the U's after handing in a transfer request, White forced his way back into the side with his fitness improved. In August 2008, with the club now back in League One following relegation from the Championship, White signed another new contract to extend his stay at the club.

Under the reins of new manager Paul Lambert in summer 2009, White was told that he could leave the club. White was part of a group of players who were being frozen out under Lambert, and he moved on a one-month loan deal to Essex rivals Southend United for the start of the 2009–10 campaign along with Matt Heath.

White started every game of his spell at Roots Hall and admitted to having "no idea" where his future would lie, but during his spell with Southend, Lambert left the U's to join Norwich City, allowing White to force his way back into the Colchester team under new manager Aidy Boothroyd, going on to make 39 league appearances that season. He expressed his gratitude to Boothroyd for resurrecting his career, explaining how Lambert had left him to be forgotten: "I felt I never got the chance to impress him. It wasn't that I was given the chance and messed it up, he just decided he didn't fancy me and that was that, I wasn't involved. The new manager has been like a breath of fresh air. It's nice for the forgotten players that were left disappointed by the old manager to feel wanted around the place again."

With Boothroyd departing for Coventry City, John Ward took over as U's manager and White once again found himself back on the fringes of the first-team after Brian Wilson had been signed at full-back. Ward insisted that White remained part of his plans, and an injury to Wilson in December 2010 ruled him out of the remainder of the campaign, allowing White an extended run in the first-team.

White signed a further two-year contract extension in May 2011 and went on to feature in the unfamiliar left-sided role ahead of both Michael Rose and Ben Coker during the 2011–12 campaign. During the season, White also enjoyed his 200th league game for Colchester aged 25, admitting that it was "special that Colchester is my home town club, and that I've been able to stay here this long."

The 2012–13 season saw Colchester narrowly avoid relegation, with White playing 22 league games for the club under new manager Joe Dunne. His contract was due to expire at the end of the season as Dunne expressed an interest at keeping the defender at the club. White declined the offer of the contract in June 2013, bringing to an end a nine-year stay with the U's. He had been offered a reduced salary to stay on with the club, opting instead to look for another club. He made over 250 appearances during his time with Colchester.

=== Southend United ===
On 27 June 2013, White signed a two-year deal with Southend United, the club where he had spent time on loan in 2009, becoming manager Phil Brown's first summer signing. He captained Southend to promotion from league 2 in 2015.

On 6 June 2017, White extended his stay with Southend signing a one-year deal. On 9 May 2018 White signed another new one-year deal following 37 appearances in the 2017–18 season.

In July 2019, he signed a new contract with the club.

White played his 500th league appearance on 1 February 2020 as part of the Southend team in their 2–1 victory over Lincoln City. He was substituted in the second half due to injury.

In August 2020, White signed a contract extension that would last up until the end of January 2021. This was later extended until the end of the season. White captained Southend during this period.

On 11 March 2022, White joined Southern League Premier Division South side Wimborne Town on loan until the end of the 2021–22 season.

On 18 May 2022, it was announced that White would leave Southend after a nine-year spell with the Essex-based side, in which he registered over 280 appearances for the club.

=== Braintree Town ===
Following the announcement of his departure from Southend, White agreed to join National League South side, Braintree Town ahead of the 2022–23 campaign.

On 16 May 2024, White officially announced his retirement from playing football.

== Coaching career ==
On 31 December 2023, it was announced that White would be welcoming a new role as the assistant manager with Braintree Town, following on from his playing career with the club.

On 6 May 2025, White was announced as the joint assistant manager at Chelmsford City. In April 2026, following the sacking of manager Angelo Harrop, White also departed Chelmsford.

== Career statistics ==
As of match played 21 November 2023

Appearances and goals by club, season and competition
Club	Season	League			FA Cup		League Cup		Other		Total	
Club	Season	Division	Apps	Goals	Apps	Goals	Apps	Goals	Apps	Goals	Apps	Goals
Colchester United	2004–05	League One	20	0	3	0	1	0	0	0	24	0
Colchester United	2005–06	League One	35	0	4	0	0	0	2 (Note: Appearance(s) in the Football League Trophy)	0	41	0
Colchester United	2006–07	Championship	16	0	0	0	1	0	—		17	0
Colchester United	2007–08	Championship	21	0	1	0	1	0	—		23	0
Colchester United	2008–09	League One	26	0	1	0	1	0	4	0	32	0
Colchester United	2009–10	League One	39	0	3	0	0	0	1	0	43	0
Colchester United	2010–11	League One	22	0	1	0	1	0	1	0	25	0
Colchester United	2011–12	League One	26	0	0	0	0	0	0	0	26	0
Colchester United	2012–13	League One	22	0	1	0	0	0	1	0	24	0
Colchester United	Total		227	0	14	0	5	0	9	0	255	0
Stevenage Borough (loan)	2007–08	Conference Premier	4	0	0	0	—		0	0	4	0
Southend United (loan)	2009–10	League One	5	0	0	0	1	0	0	0	6	0
Southend United	2013–14	League Two	41	1	3	0	1	0	3 (Note: One appearance in the Football League Trophy and two in the League Two play-offs)	0	48	1
Southend United	2014–15	League Two	42	0	1	0	0	0	4 (Note: One appearance in the Football League Trophy and three in the League Two play-offs)	0	47	0
Southend United	2015–16	League One	29	1	0	0	1	0	3	1	33	2
Southend United	2016–17	League One	13	1	0	0	1	0	3	0	17	1
Southend United	2017–18	League One	31	2	1	0	1	0	4	0	37	2
Southend United	2018–19	League One	33	2	3	1	1	0	4	0	41	3
Southend United	2019–20	League One	11	0	0	0	1	0	0	0	12	0
Southend United	2020–21	League Two	28	1	0	0	1	0	2	0	31	1
Southend United	2021–22	National League	15	0	1	0	—		0	0	16	0
Southend United	Total		243	8	9	1	7	0	23	1	282	10
Wimborne Town (loan)	2021–22	SFL - Premier Division South	11	1	—		—		—		11	1
Braintree Town	2022–23	National League South	36	1	2	0	—		3 (Note: Two appearances in the FA Trophy, one in the National League South play-offs)	0	41	1
Braintree Town	2023–24	National League South	9	0	2	0	—		1 (Note: Appearance(s) in the FA Trophy)	0	12	0
Braintree Town	Total		45	1	4	0	—		4	0	53	1
Career total			536	10	27	1	13	0	36	1	612	12

== Honours ==
Colchester United

- Football League One runner-up: 2005–06

Southend United

- Football League Two play-offs: 2015
