= Scott Vernon =

English footballer (born 1983)

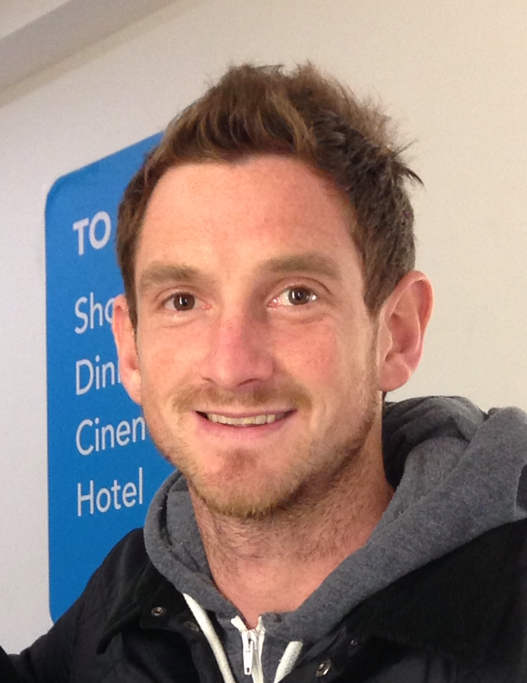
- Vernon in 2013

Personal information
- Full name: Scott Malcolm Vernon
- Date of birth: 13 December 1983 (age 42)
- Place of birth: Stockport, England
- Height: 6 ft 1 in (1.85 m)
- Position: Striker

Youth career
- 1999–2002: Oldham Athletic

Senior career*
| Years | Team | Apps | (Gls) |
| 2002–2005 | Oldham Athletic | 74 | (20) |
| 2004 | → Blackpool (loan) | 4 | (3) |
| 2005–2008 | Blackpool | 70 | (16) |
| 2006 | → Colchester United (loan) | 7 | (1) |
| 2008–2010 | Colchester United | 57 | (12) |
| 2009 | → Northampton Town (loan) | 6 | (1) |
| 2009 | → Gillingham (loan) | 1 | (0) |
| 2010 | → Southend United (loan) | 17 | (4) |
| 2010–2014 | Aberdeen | 128 | (29) |
| 2014–2016 | Shrewsbury Town | 35 | (2) |
| 2016–2018 | Grimsby Town | 56 | (4) |
| 2018–2022 | Cleethorpes Town | 112 | (89) |
| Total | | 567 | (181) |
- * Club domestic league appearances and goals as of 12:58, 25 January 2018 (UTC)

Scott Malcolm Vernon (born 13 December 1983) is an English former professional footballer who played as a striker.

Vernon played in the Football League and the Scottish Premiership for 16 years, notably with lengthy spells with Oldham Athletic, Blackpool and Aberdeen. He also played for Colchester United, Northampton Town, Gillingham, Southend United, Shrewsbury Town and Grimsby Town before finishing his career with a four-year spell with Non-league side Cleethorpes Town.

== Club career ==
=== Oldham Athletic ===
Born in Manchester, Greater Manchester, Vernon began his career at Oldham Athletic where he was most notable for a goal he scored in the FA Cup that knocked Premier League team Manchester City out in the third round. He was a popular player under Iain Dowie but struggled to find a game with both Brian Talbot, who loaned him to Blackpool, and then Ronnie Moore, who swapped him for Blackpool midfielder Richie Wellens in 2005.

=== Blackpool ===
During his first season at Blackpool, Vernon went on loan to Colchester United as he struggled to establish himself. During Blackpool's promotion season in 2006–07, he struggled to nail down a starting place and was third-choice striker behind the prolific Andy Morrell and Keigan Parker. In the championship, he managed to score 4 goals, two of which came against Colchester United. Due to the signings of Alan Gow and Steve Kabba, he found himself pushed out of the team, rejoining Colchester United, this time on a permanent deal.

=== Colchester United ===
On 31 January 2008, Vernon signed for Colchester on a permanent basis for an undisclosed fee. He joined Northampton Town on a month's loan in March 2009, scoring on his debut against Stockport County. In October of the same year he went out on loan, this time to Gillingham, before returning after one match after suffering an ankle injury.

Vernon was loaned to Southend United on 29 January 2010 for the rest of the season, along with Colchester teammate Pat Baldwin. At the end of the 2009–10 season, Vernon was released by Colchester.

=== Aberdeen ===
On 26 July 2010, Vernon signed for Aberdeen on a free transfer. Vernon made his first start and scored his first goal against Dundee United on 11 September 2010 with a hooked goal from the middle of the box into the top left hand corner. He then went on to score four goals in his next three appearances for the Dons, with goals against Motherwell and Rangers in the league and a double against Raith Rovers in the League Cup. Vernon scored another double against Hibernian in a 4–2 victory.

Following the victory against Hibernian, the Dons' hit a poor run of form losing all of their next nine games, which resulted in the sacking of manager Mark McGhee. Former Scotland manager Craig Brown was brought in as McGhee's successor. Despite the change in managers, Vernon's fine scoring form continued. Over the Christmas period Vernon scored the winning goal in Craig Brown's first two games as the Dons' new boss. On Boxing Day, in a 2–1 win over Hibernian at Easter Road and then three days later went on to score a 90th-minute winner against Hamilton.

Vernon continued his scoring form into 2011, scoring braces against East Fife in the Scottish Cup and against St Mirren in the league. He also scored the winning goal against the Paisley outfit when the two clubs met in the Quarter-Final of the Scottish Cup. Vernon played twice at Hampden both in the Scottish League Cup and the Scottish Cup semi-finals. The League Cup semi-final saw Vernon score his fourteenth goal of the season in a 4–1 defeat to Celtic.

Celtic again provided the opposition in the Scottish Cup semi-final, however the Dons' failed to score in a 4–0 defeat to the eventual cup winners. Vernon revealed that he had been playing the season despite having a recurring hernia injury. After seeing Aberdeen move clear of relegation, Vernon announced that he was to have surgery on his injury and would play no further part in Aberdeen's final fixtures. As a result, the Englishman finished his debut season as Aberdeen's top scorer, scoring 15 goals in 42 appearances.

Vernon started the 2011–12 season as the first choice striker, playing initially alongside Darren Mackie, but forming a better partnership with Northern Ireland international Josh Magennis. Amid high pre-season expectations the Dons' failed to record a goals until their fifth game of the campaign. Vernon added to Robert Milsom's opener, to give Aberdeen their first victory of the season against Inverness. Vernon then went on to score a hat-trick later in the season against Dunfermline Athletic in a 4–0 win on 30 September. Vernon's goals became crucial, as Aberdeen tried to get away from the bottom of the table. In December 2011 he scored vital goals against St Mirren, St Johnstone and the winner against Hibernian. On 11 January 2012, Vernon sat next to teammate Andrew Considine as the pair signed extensions to their current contracts. Vernon's deal would see him stay at the club until the summer of 2014.

During the 2013–14 season Vernon scored a hat-trick against Falkirk, on 25 September 2013, as Aberdeen won 5–0 in a League Cup tie. In the 2014 Scottish League Cup Final, Vernon came on as an extra-time substitute and scored in the penalty shoot-out to help Aberdeen win their first trophy for 19 years. He then scored his second hat-trick of the season on 6 May 2014, in a 3–1 win away to Dundee United. Vernon left Aberdeen when his contract expired at the end of the season, having not been offered a new one by manager Derek McInnes.

=== Shrewsbury Town ===
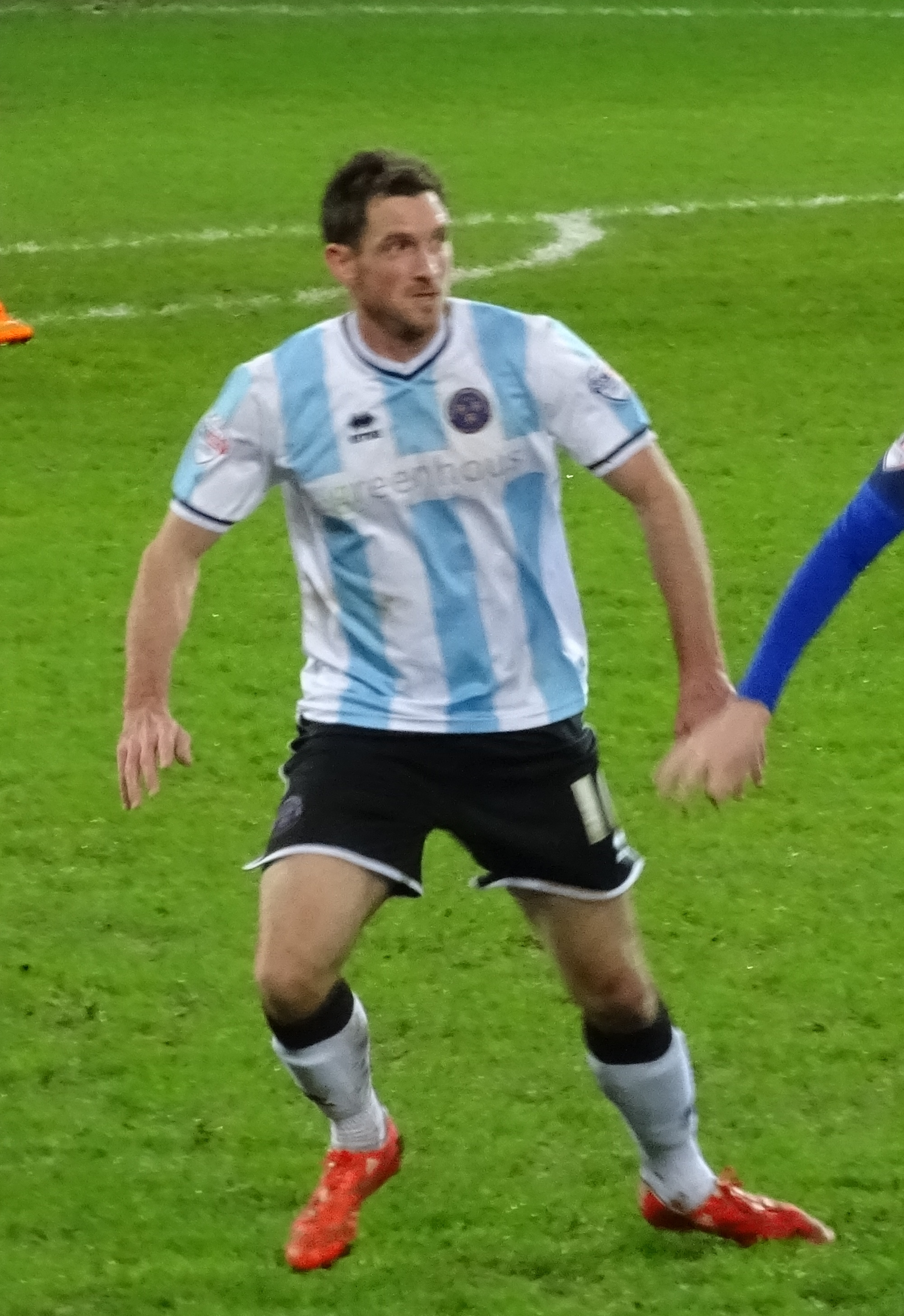
Vernon playing for Shrewsbury Town in 2016

On 18 June 2014, Vernon returned to English football, joining Shrewsbury Town in League Two on a two-year contract. Vernon was previously linked with a move to Dundee, but he rejected the move after both parties talks.

He made his Shrewsbury debut against AFC Wimbledon on 9 August 2014 at Kingsmeadow, and scored his first goal for the club in a 1–0 League Cup victory over his former club Blackpool on his home debut at New Meadow three days later. Vernon struggled to stay in the side, however a half-time formation change in an away match at Carlisle United in February 2015 saw him recalled in an advanced midfield role. He kept his place for the next game where he also scored his first league goal for Shrewsbury, in the return fixture against Wimbledon.

Vernon continued to feature sporadically for Shrewsbury as they won promotion back to League One at the first attempt, and was placed on the transfer list ahead of the 2015−16 season, although he did score a hat-trick as Shrewsbury defeated Market Drayton Town in the semi-final of the Shropshire Senior Cup during pre-season. He was recalled to the first-team when he featured as a substitute in an FA Cup first-round tie against Gainsborough Trinity in November 2015, where he claimed an assist for James Collins 71st-minute goal in a 1−0 victory over the non-league side. Later that month, on making his first start of the season following his recall, he scored in a 4−2 victory over Sheffield United at Bramall Lane, but he was subsequently released at the end of the season.

=== Grimsby Town ===
On 30 July 2016, Vernon signed a two-year contract with newly promoted League Two side Grimsby Town on a free transfer. He made his debut on 6 August 2016 in the opening game of the season, a 2–0 win over Morecambe. Vernon scored his first goal for the club on 21 January 2017, the winner in a 2–0 home victory over Notts County. He was released by Grimsby at the end of the 2017–18 season.

=== Cleethorpes Town ===
On 23 July 2018, Vernon signed for Northern Premier League Division One East side Cleethorpes Town. Vernon ended the 2018–19 season as joint third-top scorer in the Northern Premier League Division One East, with 21 goals. On 16 May 2022, Vernon announced his retirement from professional football.

== Filmography ==
- Babe (1995) - Other character voices

== Career statistics ==
As of match played 7 April 2018

Appearances and goals by club, season and competition
| Club | Season | League | | | FA Cup | | League Cup | | Other | | Total | |
| Club | Season | Division | Apps | Goals | Apps | Goals | Apps | Goals | Apps | Goals | Apps | Goals |
|---|---|---|---|---|---|---|---|---|---|---|---|---|
| Oldham Athletic | 2002–03 | Second Division | 7 | 1 | 1 | 0 | 0 | 0 | 1 (Note: Appearances in the Football League Trophy) | 2 | 9 | 3 |
| Oldham Athletic | 2003–04 | Second Division | 45 | 12 | 1 | 0 | 1 | 0 | 2 | 2 | 49 | 14 |
| Oldham Athletic | 2004–05 | League One | 22 | 7 | 3 | 1 | 0 | 0 | 4 | 2 | 29 | 10 |
| Oldham Athletic | Total | | 74 | 20 | 5 | 1 | 1 | 0 | 7 | 6 | 87 | 27 |
| Blackpool (loan) | 2004–05 | League One | 4 | 3 | 0 | 0 | 0 | 0 | 0 | 0 | 4 | 3 |
| Blackpool | 2005–06 | League One | 17 | 1 | 1 | 0 | 1 | 0 | 1 | 1 | 20 | 2 |
| Blackpool | 2006–07 | League One | 38 | 11 | 4 | 1 | 1 | 2 | 1 (Note: Appearance in the League One play-offs) | 0 | 44 | 14 |
| Blackpool | 2007–08 | Championship | 15 | 4 | 1 | 0 | 3 | 0 | 0 | 0 | 19 | 4 |
| Blackpool | Total | | 74 | 19 | 6 | 1 | 5 | 2 | 2 | 1 | 87 | 23 |
| Colchester United (loan) | 2005–06 | League One | 7 | 1 | 0 | 0 | 0 | 0 | 0 | 0 | 7 | 1 |
| Colchester United | 2007–08 | Championship | 17 | 5 | 0 | 0 | 0 | 0 | 0 | 0 | 17 | 5 |
| Colchester United | 2008–09 | League One | 33 | 4 | 1 | 0 | 2 | 0 | 4 | 0 | 40 | 4 |
| Colchester United | 2009–10 | League One | 7 | 3 | 0 | 0 | 1 | 0 | 1 | 0 | 9 | 3 |
| Colchester United | Total | | 64 | 13 | 1 | 0 | 3 | 0 | 5 | 0 | 73 | 13 |
| Northampton Town (loan) | 2008–09 | League One | 6 | 1 | 0 | 0 | 0 | 0 | 0 | 0 | 6 | 1 |
| Gillingham (loan) | 2009–10 | League One | 1 | 0 | 0 | 0 | 0 | 0 | 0 | 0 | 1 | 0 |
| Southend United (loan) | 2009–10 | League One | 17 | 4 | 0 | 0 | 0 | 0 | 0 | 0 | 17 | 4 |
| Aberdeen | 2010–11 | Scottish Premier League | 33 | 9 | 5 | 3 | 4 | 3 | 0 | 0 | 42 | 15 |
| Aberdeen | 2011–12 | Scottish Premier League | 35 | 11 | 5 | 2 | 1 | 0 | 0 | 0 | 41 | 13 |
| Aberdeen | 2012–13 | Scottish Premier League | 35 | 3 | 3 | 0 | 3 | 3 | 0 | 0 | 41 | 6 |
| Aberdeen | 2013–14 | Scottish Premier League | 25 | 6 | 4 | 0 | 5 | 3 | 0 | 0 | 34 | 9 |
| Aberdeen | Total | | 128 | 29 | 17 | 5 | 13 | 9 | 0 | 0 | 158 | 43 |
| Shrewsbury Town | 2014–15 | League Two | 22 | 1 | 1 | 0 | 2 | 1 | 1 | 0 | 26 | 2 |
| Shrewsbury Town | 2015–16 | League One | 13 | 1 | 5 | 0 | 0 | 0 | 0 | 0 | 18 | 1 |
| Shrewsbury Town | Total | | 35 | 2 | 6 | 0 | 2 | 1 | 1 | 0 | 44 | 3 |
| Grimsby Town | 2016–17 | League Two | 28 | 3 | 1 | 0 | 0 | 0 | 3 (Note: Appearances in the EFL Trophy) | 0 | 32 | 3 |
| Grimsby Town | 2017–18 | League Two | 28 | 1 | 1 | 0 | 0 | 0 | 1 | 0 | 30 | 1 |
| Grimsby Town | Total | | 56 | 4 | 2 | 0 | 0 | 0 | 4 | 0 | 62 | 4 |
| Career Total | | | 458 | 92 | 37 | 7 | 24 | 12 | 19 | 7 | 535 | 118 |

== Honours ==
Colchester United

- Football League One runner-up: 2005−06

Blackpool

- Football League One play-offs: 2007

Aberdeen

- Scottish League Cup: 2013−14

Shrewsbury Town

- Football League Two second-place promotion: 2014−15
