= 2008–09 Colchester United F.C. season =

Colchester United
2008–09 season
- Owner: Robbie Cowling
- Chairman: Robbie Cowling
- Manager: Geraint Williams (until 22 September); Kit Symons (caretaker) (22 September until 8 October); Paul Lambert (from 9 October)
- Stadium: Colchester Community Stadium
- League One: 12th
- FA Cup: 1st round (eliminated by Leyton Orient)
- League Cup: 2nd round (eliminated by Ipswich Town)
- Football League Trophy: Semi-final (southern section) (eliminated by Luton Town)
- Top goalscorer: League: Mark Yeates (12); All: Mark Yeates (13)
- Highest home attendance: 9,559 v Leeds United, 4 April 2009
- Lowest home attendance: 3,179 v Stockport County, 24 February 2009
- Average home league attendance: 5,076
- Biggest win: 5–0 v Carlisle United, 25 October 2008
- Biggest defeat: 0–3 v Milton Keynes Dons, 20 September 2008 v Scunthorpe United, 28 March 2009
Home colours	Away colours	Third colours

The 2008–09 season was Colchester United's 67th season in their history and first season back in the third tier of English football following relegation, League One. Alongside competing in League One, the club also participated in the FA Cup, the League Cup and the Football League Trophy.

Colchester returned to League One following relegation from the Championship last season. It was also their first season in their new home the Colchester Community Stadium after moving from Layer Road over the summer. It took them until October to register their first home victory by beating Carlisle United 5–0, but by this time the club had already seen managerial changes. After a poor start to the season in which the U's found themselves sporadically in the relegation zone, Geraint Williams was sacked and Paul Lambert was brought in as his replacement in early October. Colchester had a good mid-season run from November through January but had to settle for a mid-table finish come the end of the season.

Colchester were eliminated from the FA Cup at the first round stage by Leyton Orient, while rivals Ipswich Town beat the U's at Portman Road in the second round of the League Cup. They made the area semi-final of the Football League Trophy where they lost out to Luton Town.

== Season overview ==
Following relegation from the Championship, Colchester experienced a summer of great change. Club stalwart Karl Duguid left the club to remain in the Championship with Plymouth Argyle, while top scorer Kevin Lisbie joined neighbours Ipswich Town for £600,000. To replace him, Geraint Williams once again broke the club's transfer record, signing Cheltenham Town forward Steven Gillespie for £400,000. Construction on the Colchester Community Stadium had completed and the moving process from Layer Road was underway during the summer months.

The first event to be held at the new stadium was a ramp-up exhibition game against Spanish side Athletic Bilbao on 4 August. Scott Vernon had the honour of scoring Colchester's first goal at their new home as 5,610 witnessed the 2–1 defeat for the U's.

The first ever league fixture came on 16 August when Colchester were held to a 0–0 draw against Huddersfield Town. Mark Yeates was the first competitive goalscorer at the Community Stadium, scoring both goals in a 2–2 draw with Oldham Athletic on 30 August. United couldn't find a win at home, and following a 3–0 defeat at the Stadium by Milton Keynes Dons, Williams was relieved of his duties with a record of one league win from six games and the club in the bottom four.

Assistant manager Kit Symons took charge for four games before Paul Lambert was unveiled as the new Colchester manager in early October. They earned their first home victory of the season on 25 October, a resounding 5–0 win over Carlisle United. Lambert brought in numerous loan players, including Marc Tierney and Jimmy Walker while also signing Alan Maybury.

In December, long-serving Chief Executive Marie Partner left the club as Robbie Cowling shuffled his boardroom, bringing in Steve Bradshaw to the position. Partner had spent over 21 years with the club. Cowling would soon buy out all remaining shares in the club.

The club earned back-to-back wins for the first time in 19 months as they beat Yeovil Town and Northampton Town to set up a run across the New Year of nine games unbeaten. A run of ten wins and four draws from 18 games eventually earned Lambert the January League One Manager of the Month award as the U's rose to seven points off the play-off positions.

Lambert made further late season loan signings by bringing in Karl Hawley, Neal Trotman and Ashley Vincent. However, with the play-offs on the horizon, Colchester's form took a downturn as they lost six of the remaining nine home games, including consecutive defeats in the final four home games. A club record attendance was set on 4 April, when 9,599 witnessed a 1–0 win for Leeds United at the Community Stadium. This was the highest attendance for a home league game since 20 April 1974 in a 2–0 defeat by Gillingham.

Colchester ended the season in 12th position, 13 points off a play-off place. They had endured their worst-ever home season, suffering twelve defeats, while they also enjoyed their best-ever away season, registering eleven victories on the road.

In the cup competitions, Colchester returned to the Football League Trophy by reaching the southern section semi-final, where they were eliminated by eventual winners Luton Town. They were beaten by Ipswich Town 2–1 in the second round of the League Cup at Portman Road, while Leyton Orient won in the first round of the FA Cup.

== Players ==
As of match played 2 May 2009.

No.	Name	Position	Nationality	Place of birth	Date of birth	Apps	Goals	Signed from	Date signed	Fee
Goalkeepers
1	Dean Gerken	GK	(England)	Southend-on-Sea	22 May 1985 (aged 23)	102	0	Youth team	1 August 2002	Free transfer
23	Mark Cousins	GK	(England)	Chelmsford	9 January 1987 (aged 21)	2	0	Youth team	1 August 2004	Free transfer
Defenders
2	John White	FB	(England)	Colchester	26 July 1986 (aged 21)	105	0	Youth team	1 July 2003	Free transfer
3	Matt Lockwood	LB	(England)	Rochford	17 October 1976 (aged 31)	0	0	(England) Nottingham Forest	3 June 2008	Free transfer
5	Chris Coyne	CB	(Australia)	Brisbane	20 December 1978 (aged 29)	16	1	(England) Luton Town	10 January 2008	£350,000
6	Paul Reid	CB	(England)	Carlisle	18 February 1982 (aged 26)	0	0	(England) Barnsley	2 July 2008	Free transfer
12	Pat Baldwin	CB	(England)	City of London	12 November 1982 (aged 25)	177	1	(England) Chelsea	16 August 2002	Free transfer
16	Matt Heath	CB	(England)	Leicester	1 November 1981 (aged 26)	5	0	(England) Leeds United	13 May 2008	Free transfer
18	Philip Ifil	RB	(England)	Willesden	18 January 1986 (aged 22)	20	0	(England) Tottenham Hotspur	10 January 2008	Undisclosed
19	Alan Maybury	FB	(Republic of Ireland)	Dublin	8 August 1978 (aged 29)	0	0	(England) Leicester City	12 December 2008	Free transfer
32	Marc Tierney	FB	(England)	Prestwich	23 August 1985 (aged 22)	6	0	(England) Shrewsbury Town	2 January 2009	Undisclosed
Midfielders
4	Johnnie Jackson	MF	(England)	Camden Town	15 August 1982 (aged 25)	89	9	(England) Tottenham Hotspur	20 June 2006	Free transfer
8	Dean Hammond	MF	(England)	Hastings	7 March 1983 (aged 25)	13	0	(England) Brighton & Hove Albion	31 January 2008	£250,000
10	Kemal Izzet	MF	(England)	Whitechapel	29 September 1980 (aged 27)	287	20	(England) Charlton Athletic	13 April 2001	Free transfer
17	David Perkins	MF	(England)	Heysham	21 June 1982 (aged 25)	0	0	(England) Rochdale	8 July 2008	Undisclosed
27	Anthony Wordsworth	MF	(England)	Camden Town	3 January 1989 (aged 19)	4	0	Youth team	1 July 2006	Free transfer
34	Sam Corcoran	MF	(England)	Enfield Town	5 February 1991 (aged 17)	0	0	Youth team	31 March 2009	Free transfer
Forwards
7	Steven Gillespie	FW	(England)	Liverpool	4 June 1985 (aged 22)	0	0	(England) Cheltenham Town	7 July 2008	£400,000
9	Clive Platt	FW	(England)	Wolverhampton	27 October 1977 (aged 30)	42	8	(England) Milton Keynes Dons	3 July 2007	£300,000
11	Mark Yeates	WG	(Republic of Ireland)	Dublin	11 January 1985 (aged 23)	83	14	(England) Tottenham Hotspur	3 July 2007	Undisclosed
14	Akanni-Sunday Wasiu	FW	(Nigeria)	Abuja	18 March 1984 (aged 24)	0	0	(England) St Albans City	24 July 2008	Free transfer
15	Jamie Guy	FW	(England)	Barking	1 August 1987 (aged 20)	54	3	Youth team	1 July 2004	Free transfer
22	Simon Hackney	WG	(England)	Manchester	5 February 1984 (aged 24)	0	0	(England) Carlisle United	26 January 2009	£100,000
24	Scott Vernon	FW	(England)	Manchester	13 December 1983 (aged 24)	24	6	(England) Blackpool	31 January 2008	Undisclosed
30	Medy Elito	WG	(England)	(Zaire) Kinshasa	20 March 1990 (aged 18)	11	1	Youth team	1 July 2007	Free transfer

== Transfers ==
=== In ===
Date	Position	Nationality	Name	From	Fee	Ref.
13 May 2008	CB	(England)	Matt Heath	(England) Leeds United	Free transfer	
3 June 2008	LB	(England)	Matt Lockwood	(England) Nottingham Forest	Free transfer	
2 July 2008	CB	(England)	Paul Reid	(England) Barnsley	Free transfer	
7 July 2008	FW	(England)	Steven Gillespie	(England) Cheltenham Town	£400,000	
8 July 2008	MF	(England)	David Perkins	(England) Rochdale	Undisclosed	
24 July 2008	FW	(Nigeria)	Akanni-Sunday Wasiu	(England) St Albans City	Free transfer	
12 December 2008	FB	(Republic of Ireland)	Alan Maybury	(England) Leicester City	Free transfer	
2 January 2009	FB	(England)	Marc Tierney	(England) Shrewsbury Town	Undisclosed	
26 January 2009	WG	(England)	Simon Hackney	(England) Carlisle United	£100,000	
31 March 2009	MF	(England)	Sam Corcoran	Youth team	Free transfer	

- Total spending: ▼ ~ £500,000

=== Out ===
Date	Position	Nationality	Name	To	Fee	Ref.
31 May 2008	DF	(England)	Tom Devaux	Free agent	Released	
31 May 2008	FW	(England)	Teddy Sheringham	Free agent	Retired	
1 June 2008	GK	(Northern Ireland)	Aidan Davison	Free agent	Retired	
3 June 2008	WG	(England)	Kevin McLeod	(England) Brighton & Hove Albion	Released	
24 June 2008	MF	(England)	Karl Duguid	(England) Plymouth Argyle	Undisclosed	
30 June 2008	GK	(Nigeria)	Ademola Bankole	Free agent	Retired	(Note: Remained with the club as goalkeeping coach)
30 June 2008	FB	(England)	Danny Granville	(England) Leyton Orient	Released	
30 June 2008	MF	(England)	Luke Guttridge	(England) Northampton Town	Released	
30 June 2008	FW	(England)	Tom Webb	(England) Glenn Hoddle Academy	Released	
18 July 2008	FW	(Jamaica)	Kevin Lisbie	(England) Ipswich Town	£600,000	
1 August 2008	MF	(England)	Kevin Watson	(England) Luton Town	Released	
6 March 2009	FW	(England)	Fabian Batchelor	(England) Grays Athletic	Released	
6 March 2009	DF	(England)	James Hammond	Free agent	Released	

- Total incoming: ▲ ~ £600,000

=== Loans in ===
Date	Position	Nationality	Name	From	End date	Ref.
25 September 2008	LB	(England)	Gary Borrowdale	(England) Coventry City	12 October 2008	
3 November 2008	FW	(England)	Sam Williams	(England) Aston Villa	29 January 2009	
13 November 2008	LB	(England)	Lee Hills	(England) Coventry City	13 December 2008	
20 November 2008	FW	(Wales)	Jermaine Easter	(England) Plymouth Argyle	20 December 2008	
27 November 2008	FB	(England)	Marc Tierney	(England) Shrewsbury Town	1 January 2009	
27 November 2008	GK	(England)	Jimmy Walker	(England) West Ham United	28 February 2009	
15 January 2009	WG	(England)	Lewis Gobern	(England) Wolverhampton Wanderers	31 May 2009	
19 March 2009	CB	(England)	Neal Trotman	(England) Preston North End	19 April 2009	
19 March 2009	WG	(England)	Ashley Vincent	(England) Cheltenham Town	31 May 2009	
20 March 2009	FW	(England)	Karl Hawley	(England) Preston North End	31 May 2009	

=== Loans out ===
Date	Position	Nationality	Name	To	End date	Ref.
10 July 2008	FW	(England)	Jamie Guy	(England) Oxford United	3 February 2009	
24 November 2008	DF	(England)	James Hammond	(England) Fisher Athletic	24 December 2008	
15 January 2009	FW	(Nigeria)	Akanni-Sunday Wasiu	(England) Luton Town	15 February 2009	
2 February 2009	LB	(England)	Matt Lockwood	(England) Barnet	7 April 2009	
2 March 2009	CB	(England)	Matt Heath	(England) Brighton & Hove Albion	7 April 2009	
3 March 2009	FW	(England)	Jamie Guy	(England) Dagenham & Redbridge	31 May 2009	

== Match details ==
=== League One ===
==== League table ====
Pos	Team	Pld	W	D	L	GF	GA	GD	Pts
10	Oldham Athletic	46	16	17	13	66	65	+1	65
11	Bristol Rovers	46	17	12	17	79	61	+18	63
12	Colchester United	46	18	9	19	58	58	0	63
13	Walsall	46	17	10	19	61	66	−5	61
14	Leyton Orient	46	15	11	20	45	57	−12	56

Updated to match(es) played on 2 May 2009. Source: The Football League
Rules for classification: 1) points; 2) goal difference; 3) number of goals scored.

==== Results round by round ====
Round	1	2	3	4	5	6	7	8	9	10	11	12	13	14	15	16	17	18	19	20	21	22	23	24	25	26	27	28	29	30	31	32	33	34	35	36	37	38	39	40	41	42	43	44	45	46
Ground	A	H	A	H	A	H	A	H	H	A	A	H	H	A	H	A	H	A	H	A	H	A	H	A	H	A	H	A	H	A	H	H	H	A	A	H	H	A	A	A	H	A	H	A	H	A
Result	L	D	W	D	L	L	W	L	L	L	W	L	W	D	L	L	W	W	L	W	D	W	W	D	W	D	W	W	L	L	L	W	D	D	W	W	L	D	L	W	L	L	L	W	L	W
Position	22	21	10	12	20	23	17	17	20	21	18	19	16	18	20	21	20	16	16	16	16	15	11	11	11	11	11	11	11	11	12	11	12	12	10	10	11	11	13	10	11	13	14	12	14	12

Source: Statto.com (archived)
A = Away; H = Home; W = Win; D = Draw; L = Loss

==== Matches ====
9 August 2008 1	Hartlepool United	4–2	Colchester United	Hartlepool
15:00 BST	Brown 13', 14'; Boland 66'; Jones 76'	Report	Gillespie 78' (pen.), 90'	Stadium: Victoria Park; Attendance: 3,831; Referee: Anthony Taylor

16 August 2008 2	Colchester United	0–0	Huddersfield Town	Colchester
15:00 BST		Report		Stadium: Colchester Community Stadium; Attendance: 5,340; Referee: Rob Shoebridge

23 August 2008 3	Swindon Town	1–3	Colchester United	Swindon
15:00 BST	Cox 67' (pen.)	Report	Jackson 32'; Vernon 45'; Wasiu 89'	Stadium: County Ground; Attendance: 7,031; Referee: Clive Penton

30 August 2008 4	Colchester United	2–2	Oldham Athletic	Colchester
15:00 BST	Yeates 42', 63'	Report	Taylor 64'; Smalley 88'	Stadium: Colchester Community Stadium; Attendance: 4,708; Referee: Paul Taylor

13 September 2008 5	Crewe Alexandra	2–0	Colchester United	Crewe
15:00 BST	O'Connor 46'; Pope 69'	Report	Gillespie (red card) 87'	Stadium: Gresty Road; Attendance: 3,510; Referee: Iain Williamson

20 September 2008 6	Colchester United	0–3	Milton Keynes Dons	Colchester
15:00 BST		Report	Wilbraham 2'; Baldock 88', 90'	Stadium: Colchester Community Stadium; Attendance: 4,888; Referee: Trevor Kettle

26 September 2008 7	Tranmere Rovers	3–4	Colchester United	Birkenhead
19:45 BST	Kay 12'; Taylor 76'; Shotton 78'	Report	Perkins 4'; Yeates 15'; Platt 40'; Jackson 47'	Stadium: Prenton Park; Attendance: 5,713; Referee: Neil Swarbrick

30 September 2008 8	Colchester United	0–1	Leicester City	Colchester
19:45 BST		Report	Dyer 49'	Stadium: Colchester Community Stadium; Attendance: 5,133; Referee: Dean Whitestone

4 October 2008 9	Colchester United	0–1	Bristol Rovers	Colchester
15:00 BST		Report	Lambert 53'	Stadium: Colchester Community Stadium; Attendance: 4,811; Referee: Jarnail Singh

11 October 2008 10	Cheltenham Town	4–3	Colchester United	Cheltenham
15:00 BST	Kenton 36'; Owusu 53'; Fleetwood 57' (pen.); Hayles 90'	Report	Wordsworth 20', 43'; Jackson 51'	Stadium: Whaddon Road; Attendance: 3,580; Referee: Andy Penn

18 October 2008 11	Stockport County	1–2	Colchester United	Stockport
15:00 BST	McNeil 42'	Report	Perkins 20'; Platt 87'	Stadium: Edgeley Park; Attendance: 6,025; Referee: Darren Deadman

21 October 2008 12	Colchester United	1–2	Millwall	Colchester
19:45 BST	Izzet 35'	Report	Grabban 8'; Robinson 22'	Stadium: Colchester Community Stadium; Attendance: 5,506; Referee: Grant Hegley

25 October 2008 13	Colchester United	5–0	Carlisle United	Colchester
15:00 BST	Perkins 3'; Yeates 14', 31'; D. Hammond 89'; Wasiu 90'	Report		Stadium: Colchester Community Stadium; Attendance: 5,152; Referee: Kevin Friend

1 November 2008 14	Southend United	3–3	Colchester United	Southend-on-Sea
13:00 GMT	Clarke 8'; Laurent 13'; Christophe 90'	Report	Jackson 35'; Yeates 71'; Wordsworth 81'	Stadium: Roots Hall; Attendance: 8,920; Referee: Mick Russell

15 November 2008 15	Colchester United	0–2	Walsall	Colchester
15:00 GMT		Report	Mattis 16'; Ricketts 62'	Stadium: Colchester Community Stadium; Attendance: 4,071; Referee: P Crossley

22 November 2008 16	Peterborough United	2–1	Colchester United	Peterborough
15:00 GMT	Mackail-Smith 45'; Boyd 63'	Report	Platt 61'	Stadium: London Road Stadium; Attendance: 7,401; Referee: Mark Heywood

25 November 2008 17	Colchester United	1–0	Yeovil Town	Colchester
19:45 GMT	Easter 55'	Report		Stadium: Colchester Community Stadium; Attendance: 3,214; Referee: David Phillips

29 November 2008 18	Northampton Town	1–2	Colchester United	Northampton
15:00 GMT	Jackman 53'	Report	Platt 23'; Reid 26'	Stadium: Sixfields Stadium; Attendance: 4,833; Referee: James Linington

6 December 2008 19	Colchester United	1–2	Hereford United	Colchester
15:00 GMT	Easter 71'	Report	Guinan 29'; Ainsworth 39'	Stadium: Colchester Community Stadium; Attendance: 4,794; Referee: Andy Hall

13 December 2008 20	Leeds United	1–2	Colchester United	Leeds
15:00 GMT	Snodgrass 34'; Prutton (yellow card) 65' (red card)	Report	D. Hammond 45'; Yeates 66'	Stadium: Elland Road; Attendance: 19,625; Referee: Nigel Miller

20 December 2008 21	Colchester United	0–0	Scunthorpe United	Colchester
15:00 GMT		Report		Stadium: Colchester Community Stadium; Attendance: 4,606; Referee: Graham Horwood

26 December 2008 22	Brighton & Hove Albion	1–2	Colchester United	Brighton
15:00 GMT	Forster 21'	Report	Hinshelwood 35' (o.g.); Vernon 87'	Stadium: Withdean Stadium; Attendance: 6,299; Referee: Rob Shoebridge

28 December 2008 23	Colchester United	1–0	Leyton Orient	Colchester
15:00 GMT	Gillespie 39' (pen.)	Report	Melligan (yellow card) 82' (red card)	Stadium: Colchester Community Stadium; Attendance: 6,290; Referee: Graham Scott

12 January 2009 24	Milton Keynes Dons	1–1	Colchester United	Milton Keynes
19:45 GMT	Wilbraham 65'; Puncheon (red card) 61'	Report	Platt 12'	Stadium: Stadium MK; Attendance: 8,408; Referee: Anthony Taylor

17 January 2009 25	Colchester United	3–1	Cheltenham Town	Colchester
15:00 GMT	D. Hammond 62'; Gillespie 77'; Yeates 88'	Report	Westwood 57'; Finnigan (yellow card) 72' (red card)	Stadium: Colchester Community Stadium; Attendance: 4,183; Referee: Lee Probert

24 January 2009 26	Bristol Rovers	0–0	Colchester United	Bristol
15:00 GMT		Report		Stadium: Memorial Stadium; Attendance: 6,634; Referee: Oliver Langford

27 January 2009 27	Colchester United	2–1	Northampton Town	Colchester
19:45 GMT	Yeates 57'; Vernon 58'	Report	Akinfenwa 18'; Rodgers (yellow card) 45' (red card)	Stadium: Colchester Community Stadium; Attendance: 3,973; Referee: Iain Williamson

31 January 2009 28	Carlisle United	0–2	Colchester United	Carlisle
15:00 GMT		Report	Livesey 11' (o.g.); Perkins 82'	Stadium: Brunton Park; Attendance: 5,745; Referee: Clive Oliver

10 February 2009 29	Colchester United	0–1	Tranmere Rovers	Colchester
19:45 GMT		Report	Shotton 50'	Stadium: Colchester Community Stadium; Attendance: 3,588; Referee: Gavin Ward

14 February 2009 30	Walsall	2–0	Colchester United	Walsall
15:00 GMT	Ricketts 17'; Deeney 42'	Report		Stadium: Bescot Stadium; Attendance: 3,719; Referee: Graham Salisbury

21 February 2009 31	Colchester United	0–1	Southend United	Colchester
15:00 GMT		Report	Moussa 14'	Stadium: Colchester Community Stadium; Attendance: 8,651; Referee: Kevin Wright

24 February 2009 32	Colchester United	1–0	Stockport County	Colchester
19:45 GMT	Tierney 17'	Report		Stadium: Colchester Community Stadium; Attendance: 3,179; Referee: James Linington

28 February 2009 33	Colchester United	1–1	Hartlepool United	Colchester
15:00 GMT	Vernon 45'	Report	Nelson 71'	Stadium: Colchester Community Stadium; Attendance: 5,158; Referee: Mike Jones

3 March 2009 34	Huddersfield Town	2–2	Colchester United	Huddersfield
19:45 GMT	Pilkington 51'; Roberts 66'	Report	D. Hammond 19' (pen.), 90'	Stadium: Kirklees Stadium; Attendance: 10,580; Referee: Andy Woolmer

7 March 2009 35	Oldham Athletic	0–1	Colchester United	Oldham
15:00 GMT		Report	Platt 2'	Stadium: Boundary Park; Attendance: 4,591; Referee: Chris Sarginson

10 March 2009 36	Colchester United	3–2	Swindon Town	Colchester
19:45 GMT	Platt 1', 45'; Perkins 71'	Report	Cox 38' (pen.); Robson-Kanu 64'	Stadium: Colchester Community Stadium; Attendance: 3,827; Referee: Dean Whitestone

14 March 2009 37	Colchester United	0–1	Crewe Alexandra	Colchester
15:00 GMT		Report	Zola 63'	Stadium: Colchester Community Stadium; Attendance: 4,907; Referee: David Phillips

21 March 2009 38	Leicester City	1–1	Colchester United	Leicester
15:00 GMT	Dickov 67'	Report	Yeates 23'	Stadium: Walkers Stadium; Attendance: 20,218; Referee: Keith Stroud

28 March 2009 39	Scunthorpe United	3–0	Colchester United	Scunthorpe
15:00 GMT	Hooper 36', 59'; Lansbury 69'	Report		Stadium: Glanford Park; Attendance: 4,304; Referee: Graham Scott

31 March 2009 40	Millwall	0–1	Colchester United	Bermondsey
19:45 BST		Report	Platt 84'	Stadium: The Den; Attendance: 8,071; Referee: Andy Woolmer

4 April 2009 41	Colchester United	0–1	Leeds United	Colchester
15:00 BST		Report	Becchio 29'	Stadium: Colchester Community Stadium; Attendance: 9,559; Referee: Paul Taylor

11 April 2009 42	Leyton Orient	2–1	Colchester United	Leyton
15:00 BST	Daniels 45'; Smith 80'	Report	Platt 43'	Stadium: Brisbane Road; Attendance: 4,685; Referee: Darren Deadman

13 April 2009 43	Colchester United	0–1	Brighton & Hove Albion	Colchester
15:00 BST		Report	Owusu 57'	Stadium: Colchester Community Stadium; Attendance: 4,873; Referee: R Booth

18 April 2009 44	Hereford United	0–2	Colchester United	Hereford
15:00 BST		Report	Yeates 36'; Beckwith 43' (o.g.)	Stadium: Edgar Street; Attendance: 2,100; Referee: Carl Boyeson

25 April 2009 45	Colchester United	0–1	Peterborough United	Colchester
15:00 BST		Report	Lee 40'	Stadium: Colchester Community Stadium; Attendance: 6,532; Referee: Stuart Attwell

2 May 2009 46	Yeovil Town	0–2	Colchester United	Yeovil
15:00 BST		Report	Vincent 13'; Yeates 15'	Stadium: Huish Park; Attendance: 5,237; Referee: Fred Graham

=== Football League Cup ===
12 August 2008 1st round	Gillingham	0–1	Colchester United	Gillingham
19:45 BST		Report	Heath 11'	Stadium: Priestfield Stadium; Attendance: 2,566; Referee: P Crossley

26 August 2008 2nd round	Ipswich Town	2–1	Colchester United	Ipswich
19:45 BST	Couñago 28'; Lisbie 56'	Report	Gillespie 87'	Stadium: Portman Road; Attendance: 17,084; Referee: Richard Beeby

=== Football League Trophy ===
2 September 2008 1st round (southern section)	Millwall	0–1	Colchester United	Bermondsey
19:45 BST		Report	Perkins 8'	Stadium: The Den; Attendance: 2,456; Referee: Gavin Ward

7 October 2008 2nd round (southern section)	Gillingham	0–1	Colchester United	Gillingham
19:45 BST		Report	Yeates 60'	Stadium: Priestfield Stadium; Attendance: 1,557; Referee: Fred Graham

4 November 2008 Area quarter-final (southern section)	AFC Bournemouth	0–1	Colchester United	Bournemouth
19:45 GMT		Report	Williams 17'	Stadium: Dean Court; Attendance: 2,275; Referee: Andy Woolmer

16 December 2008 Area semi-final (southern section)	Luton Town	1–0	Colchester United	Luton
19:45 GMT	Gnakpa 29'	Report		Stadium: Kenilworth Road; Attendance: 2,638; Referee: Kevin Friend

=== FA Cup ===
8 November 2008 1st round	Colchester United	0–1	Leyton Orient	Colchester
15:00 GMT		Report	Demetriou 80'	Stadium: Colchester Community Stadium; Attendance: 4,600; Referee: Pat Miller

== Squad statistics ==
=== Appearances and goals ===
No.	Pos	Nat	Player	Total		League One		FA Cup		League Cup		Football League Trophy	
No.	Pos	Nat	Player	Apps	Goals	Apps	Goals	Apps	Goals	Apps	Goals	Apps	Goals
1	GK	(England) ENG	Dean Gerken	24	0	21	0	0	0	2	0	1	0
2	DF	(England) ENG	John White	32	0	19+7	0	1	0	1	0	4	0
3	DF	(England) ENG	Matt Lockwood	5	0	5	0	0	0	0	0	0	0
4	MF	(England) ENG	Johnnie Jackson	34	4	22+7	4	1	0	1	0	3	0
5	DF	(Australia) AUS	Chris Coyne	22	0	17+2	0	0	0	1	0	1+1	0
6	DF	(England) ENG	Paul Reid	29	1	25+1	1	0	0	2	0	1	0
7	FW	(England) ENG	Steven Gillespie	20	5	8+9	4	0	0	0+1	1	1+1	0
8	MF	(England) ENG	Dean Hammond	47	5	38+3	5	0	0	2	0	4	0
9	FW	(England) ENG	Clive Platt	48	10	39+4	10	1	0	2	0	1+1	0
10	MF	(England) ENG	Kemal Izzet	48	1	39+4	1	1	0	1+1	0	2	0
11	FW	(Republic of Ireland) IRL	Mark Yeates	50	13	42+1	12	1	0	2	0	1+3	1
12	DF	(England) ENG	Pat Baldwin	38	0	35	0	1	0	0	0	2	0
14	FW	(Nigeria) NGA	Akanni-Sunday Wasiu	19	2	3+12	2	0+1	0	0	0	2+1	0
15	FW	(England) ENG	Jamie Guy	4	0	1+3	0	0	0	0	0	0	0
16	DF	(England) ENG	Matt Heath	21	1	11+3	0	1	0	2	1	4	0
17	MF	(England) ENG	David Perkins	43	6	35+3	5	1	0	0+1	0	2+1	1
18	DF	(England) ENG	Philip Ifil	10	0	5+1	0	0	0	2	0	2	0
19	DF	(Republic of Ireland) IRL	Alan Maybury	26	0	25	0	0	0	0	0	1	0
22	FW	(England) ENG	Simon Hackney	17	0	11+6	0	0	0	0	0	0	0
23	GK	(England) ENG	Mark Cousins	13	0	9	0	1	0	0	0	3	0
24	FW	(England) ENG	Scott Vernon	40	4	15+18	4	0+1	0	2	0	3+1	0
27	MF	(England) ENG	Anthony Wordsworth	36	3	9+21	3	1	0	2	0	3	0
30	FW	(England) ENG	Medy Elito	8	0	0+5	0	0+1	0	0+1	0	1	0
32	DF	(England) ENG	Marc Tierney	26	1	26	1	0	0	0	0	0	0
34	MF	(England) ENG	Sam Corcoran	1	0	0+1	0	0	0	0	0	0	0
Players who appeared for Colchester who left during the season
19	DF	(England) ENG	Gary Borrowdale	5	0	4	0	0	0	0	0	1	0
20	DF	(England) ENG	Neal Trotman	6	0	5+1	0	0	0	0	0	0	0
20	FW	(England) ENG	Sam Williams	3	1	1	0	1	0	0	0	1	1
21	FW	(England) ENG	Ashley Vincent	6	1	5+1	1	0	0	0	0	0	0
21	GK	(England) ENG	Jimmy Walker	16	0	16	0	0	0	0	0	0	0
25	DF	(England) ENG	Lee Hills	2	0	1+1	0	0	0	0	0	0	0
26	FW	(Wales) WAL	Jermaine Easter	5	2	5	2	0	0	0	0	0	0
26	FW	(England) ENG	Lewis Gobern	12	0	5+7	0	0	0	0	0	0	0
28	FW	(England) ENG	Karl Hawley	4	0	4	0	0	0	0	0	0	0

=== Goalscorers ===
Place	Number	Nationality	Position	Name	League One	FA Cup	League Cup	Football League Trophy	Total
1	11	(Republic of Ireland)	WG	Mark Yeates	12	0	0	1	13
2	9	(England)	FW	Clive Platt	10	0	0	0	10
3	17	(England)	MF	David Perkins	5	0	0	1	6
4	7	(England)	FW	Steven Gillespie	4	0	1	0	5
4	8	(England)	MF	Dean Hammond	5	0	0	0	5
6	4	(England)	MF	Johnnie Jackson	4	0	0	0	4
6	24	(England)	FW	Scott Vernon	4	0	0	0	4
8	27	(England)	MF	Anthony Wordsworth	3	0	0	0	3
9	14	(Nigeria)	FW	Akanni-Sunday Wasiu	2	0	0	0	2
9	26	(Wales)	FW	Jermaine Easter	2	0	0	0	2
11	6	(England)	CB	Paul Reid	1	0	0	0	1
11	10	(England)	MF	Kemal Izzet	1	0	0	0	1
11	16	(England)	CB	Matt Heath	0	0	1	0	1
11	20	(England)	FW	Sam Williams	0	0	0	1	1
11	21	(England)	WG	Ashley Vincent	1	0	0	0	1
11	32	(England)	FB	Marc Tierney	1	0	0	0	1
				Own goals	3	0	0	0	3
				TOTALS	58	0	2	3	63

=== Disciplinary record ===
Number	Nationality	Position	Name	League One		FA Cup		League Cup		Football League Trophy		Total	
Number	Nationality	Position	Name	Booked	Sent off (straight red)	Booked	Sent off (straight red)	Booked	Sent off (straight red)	Booked	Sent off (straight red)	Booked	Sent off (straight red)
8	(England)	MF	Dean Hammond	9	0	0	0	0	0	0	0	9	0
9	(England)	FW	Clive Platt	7	0	1	0	0	0	0	0	8	0
10	(England)	MF	Kemal Izzet	6	0	0	0	0	0	0	0	6	0
19	(Republic of Ireland)	FB	Alan Maybury	0	0	0	0	0	0	1	0	6	0
27	(England)	MF	Anthony Wordsworth	5	0	0	0	0	0	1	0	6	0
6	(England)	CB	Paul Reid	4	0	0	0	1	0	0	0	5	0
7	(England)	FW	Steven Gillespie	2	1	0	0	0	0	0	0	2	1
11	(Republic of Ireland)	WG	Mark Yeates	4	0	1	0	0	0	0	0	5	0
5	(Australia)	CB	Chris Coyne	3	0	0	0	1	0	0	0	4	0
16	(England)	CB	Matt Heath	2	0	0	0	1	0	1	0	4	0
32	(England)	FB	Marc Tierney	4	0	0	0	0	0	0	0	4	0
2	(England)	FB	John White	2	0	0	0	0	0	1	0	3	0
4	(England)	MF	Johnnie Jackson	3	0	0	0	0	0	0	0	3	0
12	(England)	CB	Pat Baldwin	3	0	0	0	0	0	0	0	3	0
18	(England)	RB	Philip Ifil	2	0	0	0	0	0	1	0	3	0
1	(England)	GK	Dean Gerken	2	0	0	0	0	0	0	0	2	0
22	(England)	WG	Simon Hackney	2	0	0	0	0	0	0	0	2	0
26	(Wales)	FW	Jermaine Easter	2	0	0	0	0	0	0	0	2	0
3	(England)	LB	Matt Lockwood	1	0	0	0	0	0	0	0	1	0
14	(Nigeria)	FW	Akanni-Sunday Wasiu	1	0	0	0	0	0	0	0	1	0
17	(England)	MF	David Perkins	1	0	0	0	0	0	0	0	1	0
20	(England)	CB	Neal Trotman	1	0	0	0	0	0	0	0	1	0
26	(England)	WG	Lewis Gobern	1	0	0	0	0	0	0	0	1	0
30	(England)	WG	Medy Elito	0	0	0	0	0	0	1	0	1	0
			TOTALS	72	1	2	0	3	0	6	0	83	1

=== Clean sheets ===
Number of games goalkeepers kept a clean sheet.

Place	Number	Nationality	Player	League One	FA Cup	League Cup	Football League Trophy	Total
1	1	(England)	Dean Gerken	5	1	0	0	6
2	21	(England)	Jimmy Walker	5	0	0	0	5
2	23	(England)	Mark Cousins	2	0	0	3	5
			TOTALS	12	1	0	3	16

=== Player debuts ===
Players making their first-team Colchester United debut in a fully competitive match.

Number	Position	Nationality	Player	Date	Opponent	Ground	Notes
3	LB	(England)	Matt Lockwood	9 August 2008	Hartlepool United	Victoria Park	
6	CB	(England)	Paul Reid	9 August 2008	Hartlepool United	Victoria Park	
7	FW	(England)	Steven Gillespie	9 August 2008	Hartlepool United	Victoria Park	
14	FW	(Nigeria)	Akanni-Sunday Wasiu	9 August 2008	Hartlepool United	Victoria Park	
16	CB	(England)	Matt Heath	12 August 2008	Gillingham	Priestfield Stadium	(Note: Second debut for the club)
17	MF	(England)	David Perkins	26 August 2008	Ipswich Town	Portman Road	
19	LB	(England)	Gary Borrowdale	26 September 2008	Tranmere Rovers	Prenton Park	
20	FW	(England)	Sam Williams	4 November 2008	AFC Bournemouth	Dean Court	
25	LB	(England)	Lee Hills	15 November 2008	Walsall	Colchester Community Stadium	
26	FW	(Wales)	Jermaine Easter	22 November 2008	Peterborough United	London Road Stadium	
21	GK	(England)	Jimmy Walker	29 November 2008	Northampton Town	Sixfields Stadium	
32	FB	(England)	Marc Tierney	29 November 2008	Northampton Town	Sixfields Stadium	
19	FB	(Republic of Ireland)	Alan Maybury	13 December 2008	Leeds United	Elland Road	
26	WG	(England)	Lewis Gobern	17 January 2009	Cheltenham Town	Colchester Community Stadium	
32	FB	(England)	Marc Tierney	24 January 2009	Bristol Rovers	Memorial Stadium	
22	WG	(England)	Simon Hackney	27 January 2009	Northampton Town	Colchester Community Stadium	
20	CB	(England)	Neal Trotman	21 March 2009	Leicester City	Walkers Stadium	
28	FW	(England)	Karl Hawley	21 March 2009	Leicester City	Walkers Stadium	
21	WG	(England)	Ashley Vincent	4 April 2009	Leeds United	Colchester Community Stadium	
34	MF	(England)	Sam Corcoran	18 April 2009	Hereford United	Edgar Street	

== See also ==
- List of Colchester United F.C. seasons
