= 2008–09 Carlisle United F.C. season =

Carlisle United F.C.
2008–09 season
- Chairman: Andrew Jenkins
- Manager: John Ward (until 3 November); Greg Abbott (from 3 November)
- Stadium: Brunton Park
- League One: 20th
- FA Cup: Second round (eliminated by Crewe Alexandra)
- League Cup: Second round (eliminated by Queens Park Rangers)
- Football League Trophy: Second round (eliminated by Rochdale)

For the 2008–09 season, Carlisle United F.C. competed in Football League One.

Manager John Ward was sacked on 3 November 2008, with his assistant Greg Abbott appointed as his successor on a temporary basis. A month later, Abbott was given the job on a permanent basis.

== Results & fixtures ==
=== English League One ===
==== League table ====
Pos	Team	Pld	W	D	L	GF	GA	GD	Pts	Promotion or relegation
18	Stockport County	46	16	12	18	59	57	+2	50 (Note: Stockport County deducted 10 points for entering administration.)	
19	Hartlepool United	46	13	11	22	66	79	−13	50	
20	Carlisle United	46	12	14	20	56	69	−13	50	
21	Northampton Town (R)	46	12	13	21	61	65	−4	49	Relegation to Football League Two
22	Crewe Alexandra (R)	46	12	10	24	59	82	−23	46	Relegation to Football League Two

Updated to match(es) played on 2 May 2009. Source: The Football League
Rules for classification: 1) points; 2) goal difference; 3) number of goals scored.
(R) Relegated

==== Matches ====
Match Day	Date	Opponent	H/A	Score	Carlisle United Scorer(s)	Attendance	Report
1	9 August	Bristol Rovers	A	3–2	Carlton 19', 80', Bridge-Wilkinson 45'	8,285	
2	16 August	Crewe Alexandra	H	4–2	Graham 15', 19', Dobie 59', Hackney 76'	6,919	
3	23 August	Leyton Orient	A	0–0		3,803	
4	30 August	Yeovil Town	H	4–1	Graham 45', 58', 69' pen., Madine 90'	6,286	
5	6 September	Southend United	H	2–1	Graham 63' pen., Taylor 79'	6,561	
6	13 September	Scunthorpe United	A	1–2	Carlton 77'	5,188	
7	20 September	Leeds United	H	0–2		12,148	
8	27 September	Walsall	A	1–2	Bridge-Wilkinson 83' pen.	4,830	
9	4 October	Tranmere Rovers	H	1–2	Graham 90'	6,093	
10	11 October	Milton Keynes Dons	A	1–3	Graham 4'	11,194	
11	18 October	Peterborough United	H	3–3	Graham 20', 50', Kavanagh 52'	6,074	
12	21 October	Hereford United	A	0–1		2,300	
13	25 October	Colchester United	A	0–5		5,152	
14	28 October	Hartlepool United	H	0–1		5,637	
15	1 November	Stockport County	A	0–3		6,301	
16	15 November	Brighton & Hove Albion	H	3–1			
17	22 November	Cheltenham Town	H	1–0	Kavanagh 64'	5,374	
18	25 November	Millwall	A	0–1			
19	6 December	Swindon Town	A	1–1			
20	13 December	Leicester City	H	1–2			
21	20 December	Northampton Town	A	0–1		4,673	
22	26 December	Huddersfield Town	H	3–0	Graham 12', Bridges 55', Kavanagh 75'	7,883	
23	28 December	Oldham Athletic	A	0–0		6,254	
24	10 January	Leeds United	A	2–0	Graham 26', Bridges 35'	22,411	
25	17 January	Milton Keynes Dons	H	3–2			
26	24 January	Tranmere Rovers	A	1–4	Graham 60'	5,924	
27	27 January	Hartlepool United	A	2–2	Bridge-Wilkinson 12', Taylor 40'	3,765	
28	31 January	Colchester United	H	0–2			
29	10 February	Walsall	H	1–1			
30	14 February	Brighton & Hove Albion	A	2–0			
31	21 February	Stockport County	H	1–2			
32	24 February	Peterborough United	A	0–1		5,103	
33	28 February	Bristol Rovers	H	1–1	Kavanagh 4'	5,343	
34	3 March	Crewe Alexandra	A	2–1			
35	7 March	Yeovil Town	A	1–1	Bridges 90'	3,892	
36	10 March	Leyton Orient	H	1–3			
37	14 March	Scunthorpe United	H	1–1	Anyinsah 19'	4,867	
38	21 March	Southend United	A	0–3			
39	24 March	Hereford United	H	1–2			
40	28 March	Northampton Town	H	1–1	Neal 37'	5,254	
41	4 April	Leicester City	A	2–2	Bridges 32', Dobie 90'	20,159	
42	10 April	Oldham Athletic	H	1–1	Bridges 44' pen.	6,635	
43	13 April	Huddersfield Town	A	0–1		12,309	
44	18 April	Swindon Town	H	1–1			
45	25 April	Cheltenham Town	A	1–1	Harte 19'	4,290	
46	2 May	Millwall	H	2–0	Kavanagh 7', Thirlwell 50'	9,470	

=== FA Cup ===
Round	Date	Opponent	H/A	Score	Carlisle United Scorer(s)	Attendance	Report
1	8 November	Grays Athletic	H	1–1	Madine 84'	3,921	
1R	29 November	Grays Athletic	A	2–0	Graham 27', Kavanagh 52'	1,217	
2	3 December	Crewe Alexandra	H	0–2		2,755	

=== League Cup ===
Round	Date	Opponent	H/A	Score	Carlisle United Scorer(s)	Attendance	Report
1	12 August	Shrewsbury Town	A	1–0			
2	26 August	Queens Park Rangers	A	0–4		8,021	

=== Football League Trophy ===
Round	Date	Opponent	H/A	Score	Carlisle United Scorer(s)	Attendance	Report
2	6 October	Rochdale	A	2–2 (aet, Rochdale win 4–2 on penalties)			
