= Reece Beckles-Richards =

English–Antiguan footballer (born 1995)

Personal information
- Full name: Reece Beckles-Richards
- Date of birth: 19 July 1995 (age 31)
- Place of birth: Enfield, England
- Position: Forward

Team information
- Current team: Potters Bar Town (dual-registered with Enfield Town)

Youth career
- Leyton Orient
- –2011: Ryan
- 2011–2013: Aldershot Town

Senior career*
Years	Team	Apps	(Gls)
2013	Aldershot Town	0	(0)
2013	→ Hastings United (loan)		
2013–2015	Woking	10	(0)
2014	→ AFC Hornchurch (loan)	4	(4)
2014	→ Farnborough (loan)	4	(1)
2015	→ Farnborough (loan)	6	(1)
2015	→ AFC Hornchurch (loan)	9	(0)
2015–2016	Kingstonian	17	(3)
2016–2019	Wingate & Finchley	124	(25)
2019–2020	Wealdstone	2	(0)
2019	→ Oxford City (loan)	4	(0)
2019–2020	→ Cheshunt (loan)	15	(6)
2020	Hemel Hempstead Town	0	(0)
2020–2023	Cheshunt	83	(23)
2023	→ Potters Bar Town (loan)	0	(0)
2023–	Enfield Town	56	(10)
2025–	→ Potters Bar Town (dual-reg.)	4	(0)

International career^{‡}
2015	Antigua and Barbuda	1	(0)
- * Club domestic league appearances and goals as of 17:27, 18 March 2025 (UTC) ‡ National team caps and goals as of 22:13, 9 January 2018 (UTC)

Reece Beckles-Richards (born 19 July 1995) is an Antigua and Barbudan international footballer who plays as a striker for Potters Bar Town on a dual-registration basis with Enfield Town. He has also had spells at Aldershot Town, Woking, Kingstonian, Wingate & Finchley and Wealdstone.

== Club career ==
After starting his career with Aldershot Town he spent time on loan at Hastings United. He was released by Aldershot in May 2013 when the club went into administration.

In November, he signed a two-year contract with Woking after impressing on trial. In October 2014 he went on loan to AFC Hornchurch. In November 2014, he joined Farnborough on loan. He returned to Woking after his month's loan but then re-joined Farnborough in late January for a second loan spell. In March 2015, he returned again on loan to AFC Hornchurch.

On 26 September 2015, after only making one appearance for Woking in the 2015/16 campaign, Beckles-Richards joined Kingstonian on a free transfer on a contract until the end of the season. On 12 March 2016, Beckles-Richards scored his first league goal for Kingstonian in a 5–2 victory over Harrow Borough.

In July 2016, Beckles-Richards joined Isthmian League Premier Division rivals Wingate & Finchley on a non-contract deal. On 13 August 2016, on the opening day of the season, Beckles-Richards made his Wingate & Finchley debut in a 3–0 away defeat against Tonbridge Angels, playing the full 90 minutes. On 23 August 2016, Beckles-Richards scored his first Wingate & Finchley goal in a 2–2 draw against AFC Sudbury, netting the opener.

On 23 May 2019, Beckles-Richards agreed to join National League South side, Wealdstone after a three-year spell with Wingate & Finchley. On 13 September 2019, Beckles-Richards joined fellow National League South side, Oxford City on a 30-day loan. In November he again went out on loan, this time to Cheshunt, with the loan spell due to last until mid-February 2020.

On 26 August 2020, Beckles-Richards joined fellow National League South side, Hemel Hempstead Town following his release from Wealdstone. A few months later, he made a return to Cheshunt on a permanent basis where he went onto feature for the next three years before joining Enfield Town ahead of the 2023–24 campaign. In February 2025, he joined Potters Bar Town on a dual-registration basis, linking up with The Scholars once again following a brief loan spell back in 2023.

== International career ==
Beckles-Richards made his international debut in a 2018 FIFA World Cup qualification match against Saint Lucia on 14 June 2015, where he played the first 65 minutes of the fixture.

== Career statistics ==
As of match played 15 March 2025

Appearances and goals by club, season and competition
Club	Season	League			FA Cup		League Cup		Other		Total	
Club	Season	Division	Apps	Goals	Apps	Goals	Apps	Goals	Apps	Goals	Apps	Goals
Woking	2013–14	Conference Premier	6	0	0	0	—		0	0	6	0
Woking	2014–15	Conference Premier	3	0	0	0	—		0	0	3	0
Woking	2015–16	National League	1	0	0	0	—		0	0	1	0
Woking	Total		10	0	0	0	—		0	0	10	0
AFC Hornchurch (loan)	2014–15	Isthmian League Premier Division	13	4	0	0	—		0	0	13	4
Farnborough (loan)	2014–15	Conference South	10	2	0	0	—		1 (Note: Appearance(s) in FA Trophy)	0	11	2
Kingstonian	2015–16	Isthmian League Premier Division	17	3	0	0	—		6 (Note: Three appearances in Alan Turvey Trophy, three appearances and one goal in FA Trophy)	1	23	4
Wingate & Finchley	2016–17	Isthmian League Premier Division	42	13	2	2	—		8 (Note: One appearance in Alan Turvey Trophy, six appearances and three goals in FA Trophy, one appearance in Isthmian League Premier Division Play-offs)	3	52	18
Wingate & Finchley	2017–18	Isthmian League Premier Division	45	9	4	1	—		8 (Note: Four appearances and two goals in Alan Turvey Trophy, four appearances and two goals in FA Trophy)	4	57	14
Wingate & Finchley	2018–19	Isthmian League Premier Division	37	3	1	0	—		7 (Note: One appearance and one goal in Alan Turvey Trophy, six appearances and three goals in FA Trophy)	4	45	7
Wingate & Finchley	Total		124	25	7	3	—		23	11	154	39
Wealdstone	2019–20	National League South	2	0	—		—		0	0	2	0
Oxford City (loan)	2019–20	National League South	4	0	3	0	—		0	0	7	0
Cheshunt (loan)	2019–20	Isthmian League Premier Division	15	6	—		—		3 (Note: Appearance(s) in Alan Turvey Trophy)	1	18	7
Hemel Hempstead Town	2020–21	National League South	0	0	1	0	—		0	0	1	0
Cheshunt	2020–21	Isthmian League Premier Division	6	2	—		—		3	1	9	3
Cheshunt	2021–22	Isthmian League Premier Division	35	14	2	0	—		11 (Note: Six appearances and two goals in FA Trophy, three appearances in Alan Turvey Trophy, two appearances in Isthmian League Premier Division play-offs)	2	48	16
Cheshunt	2022–23	National League South	42	6	1	1	—		1	2	44	9
Cheshunt	Total		83	23	3	1	—		15	5	101	29
Potters Bar Town (loan)	2022–23	Isthmian League Premier Division	0	0	—		—		1	0	1	0
Enfield Town	2023–24	Isthmian League Premier Division	35	8	4	1	—		2 (Note: One appearance in FA Trophy, one in Alan Turvey Trophy)	0	41	9
Enfield Town	2024–25	National League South	21	2	0	0	—		1	0	22	2
Enfield Town	Total		56	10	4	1	—		3	0	63	11
Potters Bar Town (dual-reg.)	2024–25	Isthmian League Premier Division	4	0	—		—		—		4	0
Career total			343	73	18	5	0	0	52	18	413	96
