= Simon Hackney =

English footballer (born 1984)

Personal information
- Full name: Simon John Hackney
- Date of birth: 5 February 1984 (age 42)
- Place of birth: Stockport, England
- Height: 1.73 m (5 ft 8 in)
- Position: Midfielder

Senior career*
Years	Team	Apps	(Gls)
2004–2005	Woodley Sports	25	(9)
2005–2009	Carlisle United	117	(17)
2009–2011	Colchester United	35	(1)
2010	→ Morecambe (loan)	8	(1)
2011	→ Oxford United (loan)	13	(0)
2011–2012	Rochdale	2	(0)
2012	FC Halifax Town	4	(0)
2012–2013	Hereford United	1	(0)
2013	Stockport County	10	(0)
2013–2014	Northwich Victoria	3	(1)
Total		218	(29)
- * Club domestic league appearances and goals

Simon John Hackney (born 5 February 1984) is an English former footballer who recently played for Northwich Victoria.

== Club career ==
=== Carlisle United ===
Hackney joined Nantwich Town in November 2001, leaving for Woodley Sports in the summer of 2003. He impressed on trial for the non-league outfit, scoring two goals in two games for the reserves. He signed for Carlisle United in February 2005 and made his debut as a substitute in Carlisle's 3–0 win away at Canvey Island. He made only one more appearance that season, again as a sub, in a defeat to Forest Green Rovers. At the end of the season Carlisle were promoted to League Two. In the 2005–06 season he made many more appearances for Carlisle, although most of them came after being brought into the game as a sub. He scored his first two professional goals in Carlisle's 5–0 win against Rushden & Diamonds. These were the first of six goals he scored in his 30 league appearances that season, making him a key part of the promotion winning team, helping Carlisle to gain a second successive promotion, to League One. During Carlisle's first season in league one Hackney was only able to make 18 appearances, due to him picking up a serious injury to his knee cartilage in December. However, in those 18 games he did manage to score two goals. Hackney managed to recover from his knee injury in time for the 2007–08 season, which enabled him to make himself a key part of the team again, making 45 league appearances for the club and scoring eight times, including a vital goal to help Carlisle end Leeds United's undefeated start to the season with 3–1 win. During the first half of the 2008–09 season he made 22 appearances for Carlisle but only managed to score one goal against Crewe Alexandra. However, towards the middle of the season his form dropped slightly and Jeff Smith took his place in the starting line up. Colchester United made two enquiries which were both rejected, with one reported offer of £25,000 being called 'a mickey-take'. Colchester then came back with an improved 'six-figure' offer which Carlisle accepted on 26 January. During his time at Carlisle, Hackney made over 100 appearances for the club, helped them gain successive promotions and became a huge favourite with the fans.

=== Colchester United ===
Simon arrived at the Weston Homes Community Stadium during the January transfer window of 2009 for an undisclosed fee, believed to be in the region of £120,000, and immediately became a fans favourite with his skilful and exciting performances on the left wing for Colchester. He provided several assists in the opening games of the 2009–10 season, including three in the 7–1 victory at Norwich City and the assist for the second goal against Yeovil Town. Simon scored his first goal of the season with an injury-time free kick against Leyton Orient in a 2–1 home defeat in the League Cup 1st Round. He also scored in the FA Cup 1st Round against Bromley on 7 November 2009. After leaving the U's twice on loan to League Two clubs, it was clear his future lay away from Colchester United and he was subsequently released from his contract on 4 May 2011.

=== Morecambe ===
On 8 March 2010 Hackney joined Morecambe on a month-long loan, which was later extended to 8 May with the option of the play-off games if needed. Due to a 24-hour recall clause in the deal, Aidy Boothroyd recalled him to Colchester on 15 April.

=== Rochdale ===
On 25 June 2011, Hackney signed a one-year deal with Rochdale.

On 5 July 2012 he joined Wrexham on trial, along with ex-Coventry City midfielder Kevin Thornton and former Tranmere Rovers goalkeeper Andy Coughlin.

=== FC Halifax Town ===
On 14 September 2012 Hackney signed for Conference North club FC Halifax Town on a one month trial, making his debut as a 60th-minute substitute a day later in a 5–0 victory over Gloucester City.

=== Hereford United ===
On 7 December 2012 Hackney signed for Hereford United, but left the club on 8 January 2013 after only making one league appearance against Barrow.

=== Stockport County ===
In February 2013, Hackney signed for Stockport County on non-contract terms.

=== Northwich Victoria ===
In September 2013, Hackney signed for Northwich Victoria.

=== Personal life ===
After retiring from football, Hackney qualified as a personal trainer and now runs a fitness business in Stockport.

== Career statistics ==
Appearances and goals by club, season and competition
Club	Season	League			FA Cup		League Cup		Other		Total	
Club	Season	Division	Apps	Goals	Apps	Goals	Apps	Goals	Apps	Goals	Apps	Goals
Woodley Sports	2004–05	NPL Division One	25	9	0	0	—		0	0	25	9
Carlisle United	2004–05	Conference National	2	0	0	0	—		0	0	2	0
Carlisle United	2005–06	League Two	30	6	1	0	1	0	7 (Note: Appearance(s) in Football League Trophy)	0	39	6
Carlisle United	2006–07	League One	18	2	0	0	2	0	1	0	21	2
Carlisle United	2007–08	League One	43	8	2	0	2	0	4 (Note: Two appearances in Football League Trophy, two appearances in Football League One play-offs)	0	51	8
Carlisle United	2008–09	League One	22	1	1	0	2	0	1	0	26	1
Carlisle United	Total		115	17	4	0	7	0	13	0	139	17
Colchester United	2008–09	League One	17	0	0	0	0	0	0	0	17	0
Colchester United	2009–10	League One	17	1	3	1	1	1	1	0	22	3
Colchester United	2010–11	League One	1	0	1	0	0	0	0	0	2	0
Colchester United	Total		35	1	4	1	1	1	1	0	41	3
Morecambe (loan)	2009–10	League Two	8	1	0	0	0	0	0	0	8	1
Oxford United (loan)	2010–11	League One	9	0	0	0	0	0	0	0	9	0
Rochdale	2011–12	League One	2	0	0	0	0	0	0	0	0	0
Stockport County	2012–13	Conference Premier	11	0	0	0	—		0	0	11	0
Career total			205	27	8	1	8	1	14	0	243	29

== Honours ==
Carlisle United

- Football League Two: 2005–06
- Football League Trophy runner-up: 2005–06
