= Mark Cousins (footballer) =

English footballer

Personal information
- Full name: Mark Richard Cousins
- Date of birth: 9 January 1987 (age 39)
- Place of birth: Chelmsford, England
- Height: 6 ft 2 in (1.88 m)
- Position: Goalkeeper

Team information
- Current team: Ipswich Town (academy goalkeeper coach)

Youth career
- –2004: Fulham
- 2004–2006: Colchester United

Senior career*
Years	Team	Apps	(Gls)
2005–2014	Colchester United	58	(0)
2005	→ Whitton United (loan)	10	(0)
2005–2006	→ Staines Town (loan)	1	(0)
2006	→ Enfield Town (loan)	9	(0)
2006	→ Yeading (loan)	2	(0)
2014–2018	Dagenham & Redbridge	109	(0)
2018–2019	Barnet	44	(0)
2019–2022	Bromley	89	(0)
2022–2025	Ebbsfleet United	144	(1)
Total		468	(1)
- * Club domestic league appearances and goals

Mark Richard Cousins (born 9 January 1987) is an English former footballer who played as a goalkeeper. He is currently a goalkeeping coach with the Ipswich Town academy.

== Career ==
Cousins, born in Chelmsford, Essex, is a product of the Colchester United Academy. He signed for Colchester during his final year of school after being released by Fulham. Youth team coach Micky Cook expressed uncertainty over whether to sign Cousins but asked for him to attend pre-season for assessment. Putting in an impressive performance featuring in a friendly for Barnet, Cook promptly signed Cousins on a scholarship.

First featuring on the bench for Colchester in their 2–1 away defeat to Walsall in October 2004, Cousins would later join Whitton United on work experience in October 2005 prior to making his U's debut. He had additional work experience loan spells with non-league sides Staines Town, Enfield Town and Yeading, where he made three appearances. While on loan with Yeading, Cousins faced Nottingham Forest in the FA Cup first round, with 80 league places separating the two sides. The game finished 5–0 to Forest.

Cousins had to wait until the beginning of the 2007–08 season to get his first taste of first-team action with Colchester. He was brought on as a substitute for striker Kevin Lisbie after goalkeeper Dean Gerken was sent off for bringing down Kayode Odejayi in the penalty area during Colchester's 2–2 draw with Barnsley on 18 August 2007. His first task was to save the ensuing penalty, but Brian Howard slotted the penalty away. He conceded another goal later in the game, once again scored by Howard from the penalty spot. He made just one further appearance in the 2007–08 season, replacing the injured Gerken late on in a 1–1 away draw with Bristol City on 12 January 2008.

Cousins started in three Football League Trophy games for Colchester during the 2008–09 season and played in their 1–0 home defeat to Leyton Orient in the FA Cup on 8 November 2008. Cousins finally received his chance with regular first-team football with the arrival of new manager Paul Lambert in October 2008, as he finished the season with 13 appearances in all competitions, featuring in an eight-game run in March and April 2009. Following some impressive performances, Cousins was rewarded with a new two-year contract in May 2009.

Having not played a league game for the entire 2009–10 season, Cousins earned his first extended run in the first team since the end of the 2008–09 season following an injury to first choice goalkeeper Ben Williams. He kept goal for the first ten games of the season, a run in which Colchester were undefeated, as he then was selected in The Football League's League One Team of the Week on 20 September 2010. Cousins ended the season with 16 appearances in all competitions to his name, more than his combined total from the previous three seasons.

On 27 May 2011, Cousins agreed a new two-year deal with the club, competing with Ben Williams and Carl Pentney for the 2011–12 season. During the 2011–12 pre-season, a friendly match between local rivals Colchester United and Ipswich Town was abandoned when U's midfielder Andy Bond suffered a serious head injury in a collision with Cousins, leaving Bond with concussion. Having started Colchester's first nine league games of the season, Cousins spent much of it as a back-up keeper who travelled to games but never made the substitutes bench. However, following Ben Williams' rejection of a new contract in July 2012 and his subsequent exit, Cousins was given the number 1 shirt ahead of the 2012–13 season.

After eight years around the first team waiting for the opportunity, Cousins was first-choice keeper at Colchester United. He made his first appearance in the number 1 shirt on 14 August 2012 as Colchester fell to a 3–0 League Cup defeat to Yeovil Town. After making 26 appearances for Colchester and with the club struggling at the lower end of League One, Cousins was gradually pushed out of the first-team picture, firstly by John Sullivan in November 2012, signed on loan from Charlton Athletic, and then by Sam Walker in January 2013, signed on loan from Chelsea. However, he was offered a fresh contract in May 2013, He signed on a one-year deal with the option of a further year on 14 June.

For the 2013–14 season, Colchester re-signed Sam Walker on loan from Chelsea on 19 July 2013 having been influential in helping the U's avoid relegation to League Two. Following the expiry of Walker's loan, Colchester signed him on a permanent basis on 20 January 2014, further keeping Cousins out of first-team action.

In June 2014, he signed for Football League Two side Dagenham & Redbridge on a two-year deal after rejecting a new contract offer from Colchester. At the end of the 2014/15 season Cousins was named runner up in player of the year awards. In June 2016 Cousins signed a new two contract after the club was relegated to the National League. During the 2016/17 season Cousins was mainly a substitute but did play in the end of season play-offs after getting back in the team. Cousins started the 2017–18 season as number one ahead of Elliot Justham. On 25 May 2018 it was announced that he would leave the club at the end of the season due to the expiration of his contract.

Cousins joined Barnet on a two-year deal in June 2018. He played 53 games for the Bees in the 2018–19 season, keeping 20 clean sheets. On 3 June 2019, Cousins joined Bromley for an undisclosed fee. He suffered a severe injury in the opening minute of Bromley's 3–1 defeat to Yeovil Town on 28 September, and made his return to action on 8 February 2020 in a 2–2 draw with Solihull Moors.

On 24 June 2022, Cousins signed for National League South club Ebbsfleet United.

On 23 December 2023, Cousins scored his first professional goal in a National League match against York City, a stoppage time equaliser to level the match, it finished 1–1.

== Coaching career ==
On 31 October 2025, Ebbsfleet United announced that Cousins would be retiring to become a goalkeeping coach with Ipswich Town.

== Career statistics ==
As of match played 28 September 2019

Appearances and goals by club, season and competition
Club	Season	League			FA Cup		League Cup		Other		Total	
Club	Season	Division	Apps	Goals	Apps	Goals	Apps	Goals	Apps	Goals	Apps	Goals
Colchester United	2005–06	League One	0	0	0	0	0	0	0	0	0	0
Colchester United	2006–07	Championship	0	0	—		0	0	—		0	0
Colchester United	2007–08	Championship	2	0	0	0	0	0	—		2	0
Colchester United	2008–09	League One	9	0	1	0	0	0	3 (Note: Appearance(s) in Football League Trophy)	0	13	0
Colchester United	2009–10	League One	0	0	0	0	1	0	1	0	2	0
Colchester United	2010–11	League One	14	0	0	0	2	0	0	0	16	0
Colchester United	2011–12	League One	10	0	0	0	1	0	0	0	11	0
Colchester United	2012–13	League One	23	0	1	0	1	0	1	0	26	0
Colchester United	Total		58	0	2	0	5	0	5	0	70	0
Staines Town (loan)	2005–06	IL Premier Division	1	0	—		—		—		1	0
Enfield Town (loan)	2005–06	SL Division One East	9	0	—		—		—		9	0
Yeading (loan)	2006–07	Conference South	2	0	1	0	—		—		3	0
Dagenham & Redbridge	2014–15	League Two	37	0	2	0	0	0	0	0	39	0
Dagenham & Redbridge	2015–16	League Two	23	0	4	0	1	0	1	0	29	0
Dagenham & Redbridge	2016–17	National League	3	0	3	0	—		3 (Note: Two appearances in National League play-offs, one in FA Trophy)	0	9	0
Dagenham & Redbridge	2017–18	National League	46	0	2	0	—		1 (Note: Appearances in FA Trophy)	0	49	0
Dagenham & Redbridge	Total		109	0	11	0	1	0	5	0	126	0
Barnet	2018–19	National League	44	0	6	0	—		3	0	53	0
Bromley	2019–20	National League	18	0	0	0	—		0	0	18	0
Career total			241	0	19	0	6	0	12	0	280	0

== Honours ==
Bromley

- FA Trophy: 2021–22

Ebbsfleet United

- National League South: 2022–23
