= 2011–12 Colchester United F.C. season =

Colchester United
2011–12 season
- Owner: Robbie Cowling
- Chairman: Robbie Cowling
- Manager: John Ward
- Stadium: Colchester Community Stadium
- League One: 10th
- FA Cup: 2nd round (eliminated by Swindon Town)
- League Cup: 1st round (eliminated by Wycombe Wanderers)
- Football League Trophy: 1st round (southern section) (eliminated by Barnet)
- Top goalscorer: League: Anthony Wordsworth (13); All: Anthony Wordsworth (13)
- Highest home attendance: 6,643 v Sheffield Wednesday, 14 April 2012
- Lowest home attendance: 1,747 v Barnet, 30 August 2011
- Average home league attendance: 3,747
- Biggest win: 3–0 v Preston North End, 3 March 2012; 4–1 v Oldham Athletic, 27 August 2011 v Crewe Alexandra, 12 November 2011 v Bury, 10 December 2011
- Biggest defeat: 1–6 v Stevenage, 26 December 2011
Home colours	Away colours

The 2011–12 season was Colchester United's 70th season in their history and fourth successive season in the third tier of English football, League One. Alongside competing in the League One, the club also participated in the FA Cup, the League Cup and the Football League Trophy.

John Ward led his side to another tenth-place finish in League One this term, with few changes made to the squad of the previous season. Club stalwart Karl Duguid returned to the club after three years at Plymouth Argyle, while another in Pat Baldwin left for Southend United. Youth team product Anthony Wordsworth blossomed in midfield, ending the season as the club's top scorer with 13 goals. The U's would finish the season 14 points shy of the play-off positions.

In the cups, Colchester suffered early exits in the League Cup and Football League Trophy to Wycombe Wanderers and Barnet respectively, while they reached the second round of the FA Cup but were beaten by Swindon Town.

== Season overview ==
Colchester's campaign ran in a similar fashion to the previous season, ending in the same tenth position in the league and suffering early exits in the cup competitions. John Ward consolidated the U's position in League One while chairman Robbie Cowling was cutting back on first-team spending and investing in new youth facilities to ensure the long term future for the club.

The season saw the emergence of Tom Eastman, a young Colchester-born centre back signed from Ipswich Town in the summer, while Anthony Wordsworth continued his development in central midfield, ending the season as the club's top scorer.

Colchester suffered some heavy defeats, including 5–1 and 6–1 home defeats by Milton Keynes Dons and Stevenage respectively, while they suffered 4–1 defeats on the road at Bury and Notts County, while Sheffield United put three past the U's at Bramall Lane.

However, Colchester did earn big home victories over Bury and Notts County at home, while also beating Preston North End home and away.

== Players ==
As of match played 5 May 2012.

No.	Name	Position	Nationality	Place of birth	Date of birth	Apps	Goals	Signed from	Date signed	Fee
Goalkeepers
1	Ben Williams	GK	(England)	Manchester	27 August 1982 (aged 28)	86	0	(England) Carlisle United	10 July 2009	Undisclosed
12	Mark Cousins	GK	(England)	Chelmsford	9 January 1987 (aged 24)	33	0	Youth team	1 August 2004	Free transfer
35	Carl Pentney	GK	(England)	Colchester	29 December 1989 (aged 21)	0	0	(England) Leicester City	5 August 2010	Free transfer
Defenders
2	Tom Aldred	DF	(Scotland)	(England) Bolton	11 September 1990 (aged 20)	0	0	(England) Watford	1 September 2011	Free transfer
3	Michael Rose	LB	(England)	Salford	28 July 1982 (aged 28)	0	0	(England) Swindon Town	17 May 2011	Free transfer
4	Magnus Okuonghae	CB	(England)	(Nigeria) Lagos	16 February 1986 (aged 25)	66	2	(England) Dagenham & Redbridge	1 July 2009	£60,000
6	Matt Heath	CB	(England)	Leicester	1 November 1981 (aged 29)	75	3	(England) Leeds United	13 May 2008	Free transfer
18	Tom Eastman	CB	(England)	Colchester	21 October 1991 (aged 19)	0	0	(England) Ipswich Town	1 July 2011	Free transfer
20	Brian Wilson	FB	(England)	Manchester	9 May 1983 (aged 28)	30	2	(England) Bristol City	29 June 2010	Free transfer
24	Ben Coker	DF/MF	(England)	Hatfield	17 June 1989 (aged 21)	20	0	(England) Bury Town	23 July 2010	Free transfer
25	John White	FB	(England)	Colchester	26 July 1986 (aged 24)	205	0	Youth team	1 July 2003	Free transfer
31	Bradley Hamilton	DF	(England)	Newham	30 August 1992 (aged 18)	0	0	Youth team	1 July 2009	Free transfer
34	Tom Bender	CB	(England)	Harlow	19 January 1993 (aged 18)	2	0	Youth team	1 July 2009	Free transfer
Midfielders
8	John-Joe O'Toole	MF	(Republic of Ireland)	(England) Harrow	30 September 1988 (aged 22)	44	3	(England) Watford	1 January 2010	Undisclosed
10	Kemal Izzet	MF	(England)	Whitechapel	29 September 1980 (aged 30)	423	21	(England) Charlton Athletic	13 April 2001	Free transfer
14	Andy Bond	MF	(England)	Wigan	16 March 1986 (aged 25)	46	8	(England) Barrow	29 June 2010	Free transfer
17	Martin Rowlands	MF	(Republic of Ireland)	(England) Hammersmith	8 February 1979 (aged 32)	0	0	(England) Queens Park Rangers	2 February 2012	Free transfer
22	Anthony Wordsworth	MF	(England)	Camden Town	3 January 1989 (aged 22)	125	19	Youth team	1 July 2006	Free transfer
23	Lloyd James	MF/FB	(Wales)	(England) Bristol	16 February 1988 (aged 23)	32	0	(England) Southampton	22 July 2010	Free transfer
27	Karl Duguid	MF	(England)	Letchworth	21 March 1978 (aged 33)	437	45	(England) Plymouth Argyle	20 July 2011	Free transfer
32	Jordan Sanderson	MF	(England)	Chingford	7 August 1993 (aged 17)	1	0	Youth team	1 January 2011	Free transfer
Forwards
7	Ashley Vincent	WG	(England)	Oldbury	26 May 1985 (aged 26)	69	9	(England) Cheltenham Town	1 July 2009	Free transfer
9	Steven Gillespie	FW	(England)	Liverpool	4 June 1985 (aged 25)	72	16	(England) Cheltenham Town	7 July 2008	£400,000
15	Kayode Odejayi	FW	(Nigeria)	Ibadan	21 February 1982 (aged 29)	81	14	(England) Barnsley	1 January 2010	Undisclosed
16	Ian Henderson	FW/MF	(England)	Bury St Edmunds	24 January 1985 (aged 26)	54	13	(Turkey) Ankaragücü	7 January 2010	Free transfer
19	Freddie Ladapo	ST	(England)	Romford	1 February 1993 (aged 18)	0	0	Youth team	16 March 2012	Free transfer
Scholars
	Alex Gilbey	MF	(England)	Dagenham	9 December 1994 (aged 16)	0	0	Youth team	4 July 2011	Free transfer
	Gus Mafuta	DF	(England)	Clevedon	11 June 1995 (aged 15)	0	0	Youth team	4 July 2011	Free transfer
	Nnamdi Nwachuku	FW	(Nigeria)		27 November 1994 (aged 16)	0	0	Youth team	4 July 2011	Free transfer
	Billy Roast	DF	(England)		6 June 1995 (aged 15)	0	0	Youth team	4 July 2011	Free transfer
	Jack Simmons	MF	(Wales)	(England) Basildon	25 November 1994 (aged 16)	0	0	(England) Ipswich Town	25 April 2012	Free transfer
	Drey Wright	MF	(England)	Greenwich	30 April 1995 (aged 16)	0	0	Youth team	4 July 2011	Free transfer

== Transfers ==
=== In ===
Date	Position	Nationality	Name	From	Fee	Ref.
17 May 2011	LB	(England)	Michael Rose	(England) Swindon Town	Free transfer	
1 July 2011	CB	(England)	Tom Eastman	(England) Ipswich Town	Free transfer	
4 July 2011	MF	(England)	Alex Gilbey	Youth team	Free transfer	
4 July 2011	DF	(England)	Gus Mafuta	Youth team	Free transfer	
4 July 2011	ST	(Nigeria)	Nnamdi Nwachuku	Youth team	Free transfer	
4 July 2011	DF	(England)	Billy Roast	Youth team	Free transfer	
4 July 2011	MF	(England)	Drey Wright	Youth team	Free transfer	
27 July 2011	MF	(England)	Karl Duguid	(England) Plymouth Argyle	Free transfer	
1 September 2011	DF	(Scotland)	Tom Aldred	(England) Watford	Free transfer	
2 February 2012	MF	(Republic of Ireland)	Martin Rowlands	(England) Queens Park Rangers	Free transfer	
16 March 2012	FW	(England)	Freddie Ladapo	Youth team	Free transfer	
25 April 2012	MF	(Wales)	Jack Simmons	(England) Ipswich Town	Free transfer	

- Total spending: ▼ ~ £0

=== Out ===
Date	Position	Nationality	Name	To	Fee	Ref.
31 May 2011	RB	(Wales)	Lee Beevers	(England) Walsall	Released	
30 June 2011	MF	(England)	Sam Corcoran	(England) Chelmsford City	Undisclosed	
30 June 2011	WG	(England)	Medy Elito	(England) Dagenham & Redbridge	Released	
30 June 2011	WG	(England)	Simon Hackney	(England) Rochdale	Released	
30 June 2011	DF	(Norway)	Morten Knudsen	Free agent	Released	
30 June 2011	MF	(England)	David Perkins	(England) Barnsley	Free transfer	
30 June 2011	LB	(Republic of Ireland)	Conor Powell	(England) Sligo Rovers	Released	
27 January 2012	CB	(England)	Pat Baldwin	(England) Southend United (Note: Following Pat Baldwin's release by Colchester United, he later joined Southend United.)	Released	
30 March 2012	FW	(England)	Craig Arnott	(England) Tooting & Mitcham United	Released	

- Total incoming: ▲ ~ £0

=== Loans in ===
Date	Position	Nationality	Name	From	End date	Ref.
15 August 2011	WG	(Jamaica)	Michail Antonio	(England) Reading	7 November 2011	
4 November 2011	ST	(Wales)	Casey Thomas	(Wales) Swansea City	2 January 2012	
19 January 2012	FW	(England)	Gavin Massey	(England) Watford	16 February 2012	
17 February 2012	ST	(England)	Freddie Sears	(England) West Ham United	31 May 2012	
16 March 2012	FW	(England)	Gavin Massey	(England) Watford	16 April 2012	

=== Loans out ===
Date	Position	Nationality	Name	To	End date	Ref.
29 August 2011	CB	(Wales)	Tom Bender	(England) Accrington Stanley	15 February 2012	
12 September 2011	GK	(England)	Carl Pentney	(England) Chelmsford City	13 October 2011	
13 September 2011	CB	(England)	Tom Eastman	(England) Crawley Town	16 October 2011	
14 November 2011	DF	(Scotland)	Tom Aldred	(England) Torquay United	8 January 2012	
14 November 2011	GK	(England)	Carl Pentney	(England) Hayes & Yeading United	19 February 2012	
17 February 2012	FW	(England)	Craig Arnott	(England) Leiston	30 March 2012	
2 March 2012	MF/FB	(Wales)	Lloyd James	(England) Crawley Town	18 April 2012	
22 March 2012	DF	(England)	Bradley Hamilton	(England) Chelmsford City	21 April 2012	

== Match details ==
=== Friendlies ===
6 July 2011 Friendly	Maldon & Tiptree	0–4	Colchester United	Maldon
		Report	O'Toole 8'; Vincent; Arnott; Gillespie	Stadium: Wallace Binder Ground

11 July 2011 Friendly	SDC Putten (Netherlands)	0–3	Colchester United	Putten
18:30 CEST		Report	Rose; Baldwin; Gillespie (pen.)	Stadium: Sportpark Puttereng

15 July 2011 Friendly	FC Utrecht (Netherlands)	1–1	Colchester United	Zeist
12:00 CEST	Unknown goalscorer	Report; Report (archived)	Henderson	Stadium: KNVB Campus

19 July 2011 Friendly	Braintree Town	0–1	Colchester United	Braintree
19:45 BST		Report	Gillespie 78' (pen.)	Stadium: Cressing Road

23 July 2011 Friendly	Bury Town	0–3	Colchester United	Bury St Edmunds
15:00 BST		Report	Unknown goalscorer	Stadium: Ram Meadow; Attendance: 310

26 July 2011 Friendly	Colchester United	A–A	Ipswich Town	Colchester
20:00 BST		Report		Stadium: Colchester Community Stadium; Attendance: 6,268; Referee: Darren Deadman
Note: Match abandoned after 78 minutes with the score at 0–0 following a serious injury to Colchester midfielder Andy Bond after a collision with goalkeeper Mark Cousins.

30 July 2011 Friendly	Colchester United	1–0	Watford	Colchester
15:00 BST	Odejayi 24'	Report		Stadium: Colchester Community Stadium; Attendance: 1,334; Referee: Andy D'Urso

=== League One ===
==== League table ====
Pos	Team	Pld	W	D	L	GF	GA	GD	Pts
8	Carlisle United	46	18	15	13	65	66	−1	69
9	Brentford	46	18	13	15	63	52	+11	67
10	Colchester United	46	13	20	13	61	66	−5	59
11	AFC Bournemouth	46	15	13	18	48	52	−4	58
12	Tranmere Rovers	46	14	14	18	49	53	−4	56

Updated to match(es) played on 5 May 2012. Source: BBC Sport
Rules for classification: 1) Points; 2) Goal difference; 3) Number of goals scored

==== Results round by round ====
Round	1	2	3	4	5	6	7	8	9	10	11	12	13	14	15	16	17	18	19	20	21	22	23	24	25	26	27	28	29	30	31	32	33	34	35	36	37	38	39	40	41	42	43	44	45	46
Ground	A	H	H	A	H	A	H	A	A	H	A	H	A	A	H	H	A	H	A	H	A	H	H	A	H	H	A	H	A	H	A	H	A	A	H	H	A	H	A	A	H	A	H	A	H	A
Result	W	D	L	L	W	D	D	D	L	W	W	D	D	L	D	W	D	L	L	W	W	L	W	L	D	L	W	W	L	D	D	W	W	D	D	D	D	D	L	D	D	L	D	D	W	L
Position	3	4	9	17	11	13	13	14	14	14	11	11	12	13	14	12	11	14	14	12	10	13	9	12	12	15	12	11	12	12	12	12	10	9	9	9	9	9	10	10	10	10	10	10	10	10

Source: Statto.com (archived)
A = Away; H = Home; W = Win; D = Draw; L = Loss

==== Matches ====
6 August 2011 1	Preston North End	2–4	Colchester United	Preston
15:00 BST	Mellor 60'; Coutts 70'	Report	Wordsworth 12'; Henderson 49', 65'; Odejayi 76'	Stadium: Deepdale; Attendance: 11,451; Referee: Craig Pawson

13 August 2011 2	Colchester United	1–1	Wycombe Wanderers	Colchester
15:00 BST	Vincent 24'	Report	Rendell 61' (pen.)	Stadium: Colchester Community Stadium; Attendance: 3,902; Referee: Gary Sutton

16 August 2011 3	Colchester United	0–2	Charlton Athletic	Colchester
19:45 BST		Report	Wright-Phillips 13', 28'	Stadium: Colchester Community Stadium; Attendance: 5,094; Referee: Oliver Langford

20 August 2011 4	Huddersfield Town	3–2	Colchester United	Huddersfield
15:00 BST	Rhodes 3', 59'; Novak 64'	Report	Odejayi 5'; Antonio 27'	Stadium: Kirklees Stadium; Attendance: 11,043; Referee: Iain Williamson

27 August 2011 5	Colchester United	4–1	Oldham Athletic	Colchester
15:00 BST	Wordsworth 1', 45' (pen.); Henderson 46'; Heath 56'	Report	Reid 36' (pen.)	Stadium: Colchester Community Stadium; Attendance: 3,023; Referee: Steve Rushton

3 September 2011 6	Scunthorpe United	1–1	Colchester United	Scunthorpe
15:00 BST	Grant 38' (yellow card) 43' (red card)	Report	Gillespie 74'	Stadium: Glanford Park; Attendance: 3,700; Referee: Nigel Miller

10 September 2011 7	Colchester United	1–1	Leyton Orient	Colchester
15:00 BST	Wordsworth 43'	Report	Smith 90'	Stadium: Colchester Community Stadium; Attendance: 4,258; Referee: Andy D'Urso

13 September 2011 8	Brentford	1–1	Colchester United	Brentford
19:45 BST	Donaldson 56'	Report	Wordsworth 90'; O'Toole (red card) 81'	Stadium: Griffin Park; Attendance: 4,714; Referee: Gavin Ward

17 September 2011 9	Sheffield United	3–0	Colchester United	Sheffield
15:00 BST	Evans 3'; Porter 12'; Quinn 72'	Report		Stadium: Bramall Lane; Attendance: 15,783; Referee: Darren Deadman

14 September 2011 10	Colchester United	1–0	Walsall	Colchester
15:00 BST	Wordsworth 33' (pen.)	Report	Butler (red card) 32'	Stadium: Colchester Community Stadium; Attendance: 3,103; Referee: Simon Hooper

1 October 2011 11	Chesterfield	0–1	Colchester United	Chesterfield
15:00 BST		Report	Antonio 30'	Stadium: b2net Stadium; Attendance: 6,295; Referee: Dean Mohareb

8 October 2011 12	Colchester United	2–2	Yeovil Town	Colchester
15:00 BST	Bond 38'; Antonio 54'	Report	Massey 1', 63'	Stadium: Colchester Community Stadium; Attendance: 3,521; Referee: Chris Sarginson

15 October 2011 13	Rochdale	2–2	Colchester United	Rochdale
15:00 BST	Holness 44'; Jones 88'	Report	Henderson 3'; Odejayi 14'; Okuonghae (red card) 29'	Stadium: Spotland Stadium; Attendance: 2,226; Referee: David Webb

22 October 2011 14	Sheffield Wednesday	2–0	Colchester United	Sheffield
15:00 BST	Jones 59'; R. Johnson 70'	Report		Stadium: Hillsborough Stadium; Attendance: 17,634; Referee: Geoff Eltringham

25 October 2011 15	Colchester United	1–1	AFC Bournemouth	Colchester
19:45 BST	Zubar 72' (o.g.)	Report	Thomas 1'	Stadium: Colchester Community Stadium; Attendance: 3,444; Referee: Jock Waugh

29 October 2011 16	Colchester United	4–2	Notts County	Colchester
15:00 BST	Wordsworth 49'; Antonio 66'; Henderson 71'; Odejayi 74'	Report	Sodje 58'; Hughes 90'	Stadium: Colchester Community Stadium; Attendance: 3,585; Referee: Graham Scott

5 November 2011 17	Tranmere Rovers	0–0	Colchester United	Birkenhead
15:00 GMT		Report		Stadium: Prenton Park; Attendance: 4,312; Referee: Graham Salisbury

19 November 2011 18	Colchester United	1–5	Milton Keynes Dons	Colchester
15:00 GMT	Heath 23'	Report	MacDonald 38', 74'; Flanagan 45'; Gleeson 88'; Ibehre 90'	Stadium: Colchester Community Stadium; Attendance: 4,247; Referee: Brendan Malone

26 November 2011 19	Carlisle United	1–0	Colchester United	Carlisle
15:00 GMT	Thirlwell 22'	Report		Stadium: Brunton Park; Attendance: 4,435; Referee: Mark Heywood

10 December 2011 20	Colchester United	4–1	Bury	Colchester
15:00 GMT	Duguid 2', 31'; Henderson 19'; James 66'	Report	John-Lewis 90'	Stadium: Colchester Community Stadium; Attendance: 3,156; Referee: James Adcock

17 December 2011 21	Hartlepool United	0–1	Colchester United	Hartlepool
15:00 GMT		Report	Wordsworth 36'	Stadium: Victoria Park; Attendance: 4,029; Referee: Eddie Ilderton

26 December 2011 22	Colchester United	1–6	Stevenage	Colchester
15:00 GMT	Henderson 51'	Report	Shroot 9'; Beardsley 25'; Bostwick 64'; Laird 71'; Freeman 73'; Byrom 82'	Stadium: Colchester Community Stadium; Attendance: 5,276; Referee: Fred Graham

31 December 2011 23	Colchester United	2–0	Exeter City	Colchester
13:00 GMT	Wordsworth 16'; Bond 62'	Report	Coles (red card) 64'	Stadium: Colchester Community Stadium; Attendance: 3,667; Referee: Phil Gibbs

2 January 2012 24	Milton Keynes Dons	1–0	Colchester United	Milton Keynes
15:00 GMT	Okuonghae 53' (o.g.)	Report		Stadium: Stadium MK; Attendance: 7,892; Referee: Carl Berry

14 January 2012 25	Colchester United	1–1	Scunthorpe United	Colchester
15:00 GMT	Gillespie 28' (pen.)	Report	Walker 8'	Stadium: Colchester Community Stadium; Attendance: 3,165; Referee: David Phillips

21 January 2012 26	Colchester United	1–2	Chesterfield	Colchester
15:00 GMT	Gillespie 32'	Report	Lester 6'; Thompson 44'	Stadium: Colchester Community Stadium; Attendance: 3,312; Referee: Mark Brown

28 January 2012 27	Leyton Orient	0–1	Colchester United	Leyton
15:00 GMT		Report	Forbes 28' (o.g.)	Stadium: Brisbane Road; Attendance: 4,659; Referee: Mark Haywood

4 February 2012	Colchester United	P–P	Sheffield United	Colchester
15:00 GMT		Report		Stadium: Colchester Community Stadium
Note: Match postponed on 3 February due to a frozen pitch

11 February 2012	Walsall	P–P	Colchester United	Walsall
		Report		Stadium: Bescot Stadium

14 February 2012 28	Colchester United	2–1	Brentford	Colchester
19:45 GMT	Gillespie 83', 85'	Report	McGinn 57'	Stadium: Colchester Community Stadium; Attendance: 2,923; Referee: James Linington

18 February 2012 29	Yeovil Town	3–2	Colchester United	Yeovil
15:00 GMT	Parrett 55'; D'Ath 70'; Williams 72'; Agard (red card) 90'	Report	Gillespie 19'; Rowlands 90'	Stadium: Huish Park; Attendance: 3,442; Referee: Steve Rushton

25 February 2012 30	Colchester United	0–0	Rochdale	Colchester
15:00 GMT		Report		Stadium: Colchester Community Stadium; Attendance: 3,096; Referee: David Coote

28 February 2012 31	Oldham Athletic	1–1	Colchester United	Oldham
19:45 GMT	Marsh-Brown 37'	Report	Wordsworth 81'	Stadium: Boundary Park; Attendance: 3,956; Referee: Oliver Langford

3 March 2012 32	Colchester United	3–0	Preston North End	Colchester
15:00 GMT	Gillespie 19', 52' (pen.); Bond 90'	Report		Stadium: Colchester Community Stadium; Attendance: 3,333; Referee: Lee Collins

6 March 2012 33	Charlton Athletic	0–2	Colchester United	Charlton
19:45 GMT		Report	Wordsworth 5'; Gillespie 73'	Stadium: The Valley; Attendance: 13,650; Referee: Gavin Ward

10 March 2012 34	Wycombe Wanderers	0–0	Colchester United	High Wycombe
15:00 GMT		Report		Stadium: Adams Park; Attendance: 4,838; Referee: Simon Hooper

13 March 2012 35	Colchester United	1–1	Sheffield United	Colchester
19:45 GMT	Gillespie 56'	Report	Hoskins 32'	Stadium: Colchester Community Stadium; Attendance: 4,572; Referee: Trevor Kettle

17 March 2012 36	Colchester United	1–1	Huddersfield Town	Colchester
15:00 GMT	Gillespie 3'	Report	Okuonghae 90' (o.g.)	Stadium: Colchester Community Stadium; Attendance: 3,929; Referee: Dean Mohareb

20 March 2012 37	Stevenage	0–0	Colchester United	Stevenage
19:45 GMT	Slew (red card) 45'	Report		Stadium: Broadhall Way; Attendance: 2,419; Referee: Darren Deadman

24 March 2012 38	Colchester United	1–1	Carlisle United	Colchester
15:00 GMT	Rowlands 51'	Report	Berrett 68'	Stadium: Colchester Community Stadium; Attendance: 3,672; Referee: Gary Sutton

27 March 2012 39	Walsall	3–1	Colchester United	Walsall
19:45 BST	Ledesma 38'; Sadler 44'; Bowerman 73'	Report	Wordsworth 11'	Stadium: Bescot Stadium; Attendance: 3,331; Referee: Rob Lewis

31 March 2012 40	Exeter City	1–1	Colchester United	Exeter
15:00 BST	Cureton 83'	Report	Duguid 6'	Stadium: St James Park; Attendance: 3,889; Referee: Darren Drysdale

6 April 2012 41	Colchester United	1–1	Hartlepool United	Colchester
15:00 BST	Sears 81' (pen.)	Report	Sweeney 17'	Stadium: Colchester Community Stadium; Attendance: 3,921; Referee: Pat Miller

9 April 2012 42	Bury	4–1	Colchester United	Bury
15:00 BST	Grella 40'; Harrad 43'; Coke 56'; Worrall 73'	Report	Eastman 57'	Stadium: Gigg Lane; Attendance: 3,119; Referee: Geoff Eltringham

14 April 2012 43	Colchester United	1–1	Sheffield Wednesday	Colchester
15:00 BST	Henderson 3'	Report	Llera 52'	Stadium: Colchester Community Stadium; Attendance: 6,643; Referee: Carl Boyeson

21 April 2012 44	AFC Bournemouth	1–1	Colchester United	Bournemouth
15:00 BST	MacDonald 11'	Report	Eastman 84'	Stadium: Dean Court; Attendance: 5,109; Referee: Stuart Attwell

28 April 2012 45	Colchester United	4–2	Tranmere Rovers	Colchester
15:00 BST	Henderson 4'; Eastman 46'; Goodison 66' (o.g.); Sears 84'	Report	Wallace 52'; Cassidy 72'	Stadium: Colchester Community Stadium; Attendance: 4,061; Referee: Andy Haines

5 May 2012 46	Notts County	4–1	Colchester United	Nottingham
15:00 BST	Hughes 23'; Bogdanović 33'; Judge 41'; Freeman 51'	Report	Wordsworth 90'	Stadium: Meadow Lane; Attendance: 8,942; Referee: Scott Mathieson

=== Football League Cup ===
9 August 2011 1st round	Wycombe Wanderers	3–3 (a.e.t.) (5–4 p)	Colchester United	High Wycombe
19:45 BST	Donnelly 2'; Grant 12'; Beavon 105'	Report	Odejayi 27'; Henderson 41'; Gillespie 98' (pen.)	Stadium: Adams Park; Attendance: 1,430; Referee: Pat Miller

=== Football League Trophy ===
30 August 2011 1st round (southern section)	Colchester United	1–3	Barnet	Colchester
19:30 BST	Baldwin 16'	Report	Holmes 7'; McLeod 19' (pen.); Kabba 74'	Stadium: Colchester Community Stadium; Attendance: 1,747; Referee: David Phillips

=== FA Cup ===
12 November 2011 1st round	Crewe Alexandra	1–4	Colchester United	Crewe
15:00 GMT	Moore 19'; Westwood (red card) 21'	Report	James 60', 90'; Bond 77'; Coker 87'	Stadium: Gresty Road; Attendance: 2,325; Referee: David Coote

3 December 2011 2nd round	Colchester United	0–1	Swindon Town	Colchester
15:00 GMT		Report	Ritchie 59'	Stadium: Colchester Community Stadium; Attendance: 3,035; Referee: Michael Naylor

== Squad statistics ==
=== Appearances and goals ===
No.	Pos	Nat	Player	Total		League One		FA Cup		League Cup		Football League Trophy	
No.	Pos	Nat	Player	Apps	Goals	Apps	Goals	Apps	Goals	Apps	Goals	Apps	Goals
1	GK	(England) ENG	Ben Williams	39	0	36	0	2	0	0	0	1	0
3	DF	(England) ENG	Michael Rose	16	0	12+2	0	0	0	1	0	1	0
4	DF	(England) ENG	Magnus Okuonghae	45	0	42	0	2	0	1	0	0	0
6	DF	(England) ENG	Matt Heath	30	2	22+4	2	2	0	1	0	1	0
7	FW	(England) ENG	Ashley Vincent	12	1	5+4	1	2	0	1	0	0	0
8	MF	(Republic of Ireland) IRL	John-Joe O'Toole	16	0	8+7	0	0	0	1	0	0	0
9	FW	(England) ENG	Steven Gillespie	36	12	19+14	11	0+1	0	0+1	1	1	0
10	MF	(England) ENG	Kemal Izzet	38	0	29+5	0	1+1	0	1	0	1	0
12	GK	(England) ENG	Mark Cousins	11	0	10	0	0	0	1	0	0	0
14	MF	(England) ENG	Andy Bond	43	4	28+12	3	2	1	0	0	1	0
15	FW	(Nigeria) NGA	Kayode Odejayi	47	5	33+10	4	2	0	1	1	0+1	0
16	FW	(England) ENG	Ian Henderson	50	10	45+1	9	2	0	1	1	1	0
17	MF	(Republic of Ireland) IRL	Martin Rowlands	9	2	7+2	2	0	0	0	0	0	0
18	DF	(England) ENG	Tom Eastman	27	3	24+1	3	0+1	0	0	0	0+1	0
20	DF	(England) ENG	Brian Wilson	50	0	46	0	2	0	1	0	1	0
22	MF	(England) ENG	Anthony Wordsworth	47	13	44	13	1	0	1	0	0+1	0
23	MF	(Wales) WAL	Lloyd James	27	3	17+6	1	1+1	2	0+1	0	1	0
24	DF	(England) ENG	Ben Coker	23	1	15+5	0	2	1	0+1	0	0	0
25	DF	(England) ENG	John White	26	0	21+5	0	0	0	0	0	0	0
27	MF	(England) ENG	Karl Duguid	26	3	16+9	3	0+1	0	0	0	0	0
31	DF	(England) ENG	Bradley Hamilton	1	0	0+1	0	0	0	0	0	0	0
Players who appeared for Colchester who left during the season
5	DF	(England) ENG	Pat Baldwin	6	1	4+1	0	0	0	0	0	1	1
11	FW	(Jamaica) JAM	Michail Antonio	16	4	14+1	4	0	0	0	0	1	0
11	FW	(England) ENG	Freddie Sears	11	2	5+6	2	0	0	0	0	0	0
19	FW	(Wales) WAL	Casey Thomas	3	0	0+2	0	1	0	0	0	0	0
21 (Note: Massey wore shirt number 19 during his first loan spell with the club)	FW	(England) ENG	Gavin Massey	8	0	4+4	0	0	0	0	0	0	0

=== Goalscorers ===
Place	Number	Nationality	Position	Name	League One	FA Cup	League Cup	Football League Trophy	Total
1	22	(England)	MF	Anthony Wordsworth	13	0	0	0	13
2	9	(England)	FW	Steven Gillespie	11	0	1	0	12
3	16	(England)	FW/MF	Ian Henderson	9	0	1	0	10
4	15	(Nigeria)	FW	Kayode Odejayi	4	0	1	0	5
5	11	(Jamaica)	WG	Michail Antonio	4	0	0	0	4
5	14	(England)	MF	Andy Bond	3	1	0	0	4
7	18	(England)	CB	Tom Eastman	3	0	0	0	3
7	23	(Wales)	MF/FB	Lloyd James	1	2	0	0	3
7	27	(England)	MF	Karl Duguid	3	0	0	0	3
10	6	(England)	CB	Matt Heath	2	0	0	0	2
10	11	(England)	ST	Freddie Sears	2	0	0	0	2
10	17	(Republic of Ireland)	MF	Martin Rowlands	2	0	0	0	2
13	5	(England)	CB	Pat Baldwin	0	0	0	1	1
13	7	(England)	WG	Ashley Vincent	1	0	0	0	1
13	24	(England)	DF/MF	Ben Coker	0	1	0	0	1
				Own goals	3	0	0	0	3
				TOTALS	61	4	3	1	69

=== Disciplinary record ===
Number	Nationality	Position	Name	League One		FA Cup		League Cup		Football League Trophy		Total	
Number	Nationality	Position	Name	Booked	Sent off (straight red)	Booked	Sent off (straight red)	Booked	Sent off (straight red)	Booked	Sent off (straight red)	Booked	Sent off (straight red)
4	(England)	CB	Magnus Okuonghae	8	1	1	0	0	0	0	0	9	1
22	(England)	MF	Anthony Wordsworth	9	0	0	0	0	0	0	0	9	0
9	(England)	FW	Steven Gillespie	6	0	1	0	1	0	0	0	8	0
16	(England)	FW/MF	Ian Henderson	8	0	0	0	0	0	0	0	8	0
10	(England)	MF	Kemal Izzet	7	0	0	0	0	0	0	0	7	0
8	(Republic of Ireland)	MF	John-Joe O'Toole	3	1	0	0	0	0	0	0	3	1
20	(England)	FB	Brian Wilson	5	0	0	0	0	0	0	0	5	0
15	(Nigeria)	FW	Kayode Odejayi	4	0	0	0	0	0	0	0	4	0
14	(England)	MF	Andy Bond	3	0	0	0	0	0	0	0	3	0
23	(Wales)	MF/FB	Lloyd James	2	0	1	0	0	0	0	0	3	0
3	(England)	LB	Michael Rose	2	0	0	0	0	0	0	0	2	0
6	(England)	CB	Matt Heath	2	0	0	0	0	0	0	0	2	0
18	(England)	CB	Tom Eastman	2	0	0	0	0	0	0	0	2	0
24	(England)	DF/MF	Ben Coker	1	0	1	0	0	0	0	0	2	0
27	(England)	MF	Karl Duguid	2	0	0	0	0	0	0	0	2	0
1	(England)	GK	Ben Williams	1	0	0	0	0	0	0	0	1	0
7	(England)	WG	Ashley Vincent	1	0	0	0	0	0	0	0	1	0
11	(Jamaica)	WG	Michail Antonio	1	0	0	0	0	0	0	0	1	0
17	(Republic of Ireland)	MF	Martin Rowlands	1	0	0	0	0	0	0	0	1	0
21 (Note: Massey wore shirt number 19 during his first loan spell with the club)	(England)	FW	Gavin Massey	1	0	0	0	0	0	0	0	1	0
25	(England)	FB	John White	1	0	0	0	0	0	0	0	1	0
			TOTALS	70	2	4	0	1	0	0	0	75	2

=== Captains ===
Number of games played as team captain.

Place	Number	Nationality	Position	Player	League One	FA Cup	League Cup	Football League Trophy	Total
1	10	(England)	MF	Kemal Izzet	29	1	1	1	32
2	6	(England)	CB	Matt Heath	10	0	0	0	10
3	27	(England)	MF	Karl Duguid	4	0	0	0	4
4	22	(England)	MF	Anthony Wordsworth	3	0	0	0	3
				Not recorded	0	1	0	0	1
				TOTALS	46	2	1	1	50

=== Clean sheets ===
Number of games goalkeepers kept a clean sheet.

Place	Number	Nationality	Player	League One	FA Cup	League Cup	Football League Trophy	Total
1	1	(England)	Ben Williams	11	0	0	0	11
			TOTALS	11	0	0	0	11

=== Player debuts ===
Players making their first-team Colchester United debut in a fully competitive match.

Number	Position	Nationality	Player	Date	Opponent	Ground	Notes
3	LB	(England)	Michael Rose	6 August 2011	Preston North End	Deepdale	
11	WG	(Jamaica)	Michail Antonio	16 August 2011	Charlton Athletic	Colchester Community Stadium	
18	CB	(England)	Tom Eastman	30 August 2011	Barnet	Colchester Community Stadium	
27	MF	(England)	Karl Duguid	3 September 2011	Scunthorpe United	Glanford Park	(Note: Second debut for the club)
19	ST	(Wales)	Casey Thomas	12 November 2012	Crewe Alexandra	Gresty Road	
19	FW	(England)	Gavin Massey	21 January 2012	Chesterfield	Colchester Community Stadium	
17	MF	(Republic of Ireland)	Martin Rowlands	14 February 2012	Brentford	Colchester Community Stadium	
11	ST	(England)	Freddie Sears	18 February 2012	Yeovil Town	Huish Park	
21	FW	(England)	Gavin Massey	17 March 2012	Huddersfield Town	Colchester Community Stadium	
31	DF	(England)	Bradley Hamilton	28 April 2012	Tranmere Rovers	Colchester Community Stadium	

== See also ==
- List of Colchester United F.C. seasons
