= Bradley Hamilton =

English footballer (born 1992)

Personal information
- Full name: Bradley Darren Hamilton
- Date of birth: 30 August 1992 (age 34)
- Place of birth: Newham, England
- Height: 5 ft 8 in (1.73 m)
- Position: Defender

Youth career
- 2009–2011: Colchester United

Senior career*
Years	Team	Apps	(Gls)
2011–2013	Colchester United	1	(0)
2011	→ Redbridge (loan)	9	(0)
2012	→ Chelmsford City (loan)	0	(0)
2012–2013	→ Chelmsford City (loan)	9	(1)
2013	Concord Rangers	5	(0)
2013–2014	Heybridge Swifts	3	(0)
- * Club domestic league appearances and goals as of 00:12, 1 May 2016 (UTC)

Bradley Darren Hamilton (born 30 August 1992) is an English professional footballer who last played as a defender for Heybridge Swifts.

== Career ==
=== Colchester United ===
Hamilton, born in Newham, London, is a versatile player who can either play across the defence or in the heart of midfield. He was one of four young players to be awarded a professional contract by Colchester United at the end of the 2010–11 season. Shortly after signing his contract Hamilton had a loan spell at local non-league side Redbridge alongside Craig Arnott, where he made nine appearances.

On 22 March 2012 Hamilton went out on loan, this time to another local side, Conference South side Chelmsford for one month, where he failed to make an appearance other than as an unused substitute, before returning to Colchester.

Hamilton made his senior debut for Colchester coming on for Andy Bond with 5 minutes to go in a 4–2 win against Tranmere Rovers on 28 April 2012.

On 30 November 2012, Hamilton was sent out on loan once again to Chelmsford alongside teammate Thomas Bender until 7 January 2013. He came on as a 76th-minute substitute in an FA Cup second round tie against Crawley Town on 1 December 2012, a game which the Clarets lost 3–0. His loan with Chelmsford was extended until the end of the 2012–13 season in January 2013.

=== Concord Rangers ===
After falling out of favour under Colchester manager Joe Dunne, Hamilton was released at the end of his contract with the club. He joined newly promoted Conference South side Concord Rangers in June 2013.

== Career statistics ==
As of 3 March 2013.

Club	Season	League^{[A]}		Cup		League Cup		Other^{[B]}		Total	
Club	Season	Apps	Goals	Apps	Goals	Apps	Goals	Apps	Goals	Apps	Goals
Colchester United	2010–11	0	0	0	0	0	0	0	0	0	0
Colchester United	2011–12	1	0	0	0	0	0	0	0	1	0
Colchester United	2012–13	0	0	0	0	0	0	0	0	0	0
Colchester United	Total	1	0	0	0	0	0	0	0	1	0
Redbridge (loan)	2010–11	9	0	0	0	0	0	0	0	9	0
Redbridge (loan)	Total	9	0	0	0	0	0	0	0	9	0
Chelmsford City (loan)	2011–12	0	0	0	0	0	0	0	0	0	0
Chelmsford City (loan)	2012–13	9	1	1	0	0	0	2	0	12	1
Chelmsford City (loan)	Total	9	1	1	0	0	0	2	0	12	1
Concord Rangers	2013–14	0	0	0	0	0	0	0	0	0	0
Concord Rangers	Total	0	0	0	0	0	0	0	0	0	0
Career totals		19	1	1	0	0	0	2	0	22	1

A. The "League" column constitutes appearances and goals (including those as a substitute) in the Football League and Conference South.
B. The "Other" column constitutes appearances and goals (including those as a substitute) in the FA Trophy.
