= 2010–11 Colchester United F.C. season =

Colchester United
2010–11 season
- Owner: Robbie Cowling
- Chairman: Robbie Cowling
- Manager: John Ward
- Stadium: Colchester Community Stadium
- League One: 10th
- FA Cup: 3rd round (eliminated by Swansea City)
- League Cup: 2nd round (eliminated by Sunderland)
- Football League Trophy: 2nd round (southern section) (eliminated by Wycombe Wanderers)
- Top goalscorer: League: Ian Henderson (10); All: Dave Mooney (14)
- Highest home attendance: 6,523 v Southampton, 5 March 2011
- Lowest home attendance: 2,379 v Wycombe Wanderers, 5 October 2010
- Average home league attendance: 4,071
- Biggest win: 5–1 v Exeter City, 26 March 2011
- Biggest defeat: 0–4 v Swansea City, 8 January 2011
Home colours	Away colours

The 2010–11 season was Colchester United's 69th season in their history and third successive season in the third tier of English football, League One. Alongside competing in the League One, the club also participated in the FA Cup, the League Cup and the Football League Trophy.

Aidy Boothroyd departed the club for Championship club Coventry City over the summer and his assistant John Ward was promoted to first-team manager. Owner and chairman Robbie Cowling scaled back on the spending of the previous three seasons, restricting Ward's transfer budget. Ward led the team to a credible tenth position league finish, nine points away from the play-offs while reaching the third round of the FA Cup. They were eliminated by Swansea City, while Premier League Sunderland won 2–0 in the second round of the League Cup. Old rivals Wycombe Wanderers beat the U's in the second round of the Football League Trophy.

== Season overview ==
After less than ten months in charge, Aidy Boothroyd left the club to join Championship side Coventry City. His assistant, John Ward, was promoted to first-team manager. Robbie Cowling announced that a more prudent long-term approach would be required by the club to survive, and so restricted his financial input after three seasons of spending large figures on transfer fees.

Key players from last season left the club over the summer including David Fox, Kevin Lisbie, Clive Platt and David Prutton, while Danny Batth and Kevin Lisbie returned to their parent clubs on the expiry of their loan deals. John Ward made several free transfers to replace them, including free agents Lloyd James and Brian Wilson, non-League players Andy Bond and Ben Coker, while Dave Mooney was signed on a season-long loan from Reading.

=== August ===
In the opening game of the season, Colchester quickly went behind 1–0, but found themselves leading by the eleventh minute following an Anthony Wordsworth brace. A late equaliser denied Ward victory in his first game in charge. On 10 August, Dave Mooney registered his first two goals for the club in a 3–0 win at Hereford United in the League Cup. These were to be his only away goals until the penultimate game of the season.

On 14 August, Andy Bond scored his first goal for the club since joining from Barrow against Sheffield Wednesday. The U's were again denied victory by a late equaliser. Ward's first win then followed a week later with a late goal going for them on this occasion. Bond had given the U's the lead at Rochdale, and following an equaliser from the hosts, Ian Henderson grabbed an 84th-minute winner.

On 24 August, in the League Cup second round, Premier League Sunderland hosted Colchester at the Stadium of Light. Two first-half errors from Mark Cousins handed Sunderland victory, with Darren Bent capitalising on both occasions.

For a third time this month, Colchester were again denied victory by a late equaliser during their home game against Carlisle United on 27 August. Carlisle scored a 93rd minute equaliser, cancelling out Dave Mooney's opener.

=== September ===
Colchester started September with a 1–0 win at Walsall thanks to an Andy Bond goal. He then recorded his fourth goal in five games in a 1–1 home draw with Plymouth Argyle a week later.

On 18 September, Cousins made up for his mistakes at Sunderland to record a solid point against Southampton, making numerous vital saves. This was followed up with a 3–1 home win over Tranmere Rovers, with Mooney, Wordsworth, and Magnus Okuonghae's goals all coming within the first 31-minutes of play.

On 28 September, Colchester had to settle for a point in an Essex derby game against Dagenham & Redbridge. Having come from behind to lead 2–1 through Ashley Vincent and Dave Mooney goals, the lead was surrendered in the 72nd-minute.

=== October ===
On 2 October, the U's recorded another score draw at Milton Keynes Dons, when a dominant first half performance and a goal from Okuonghae was again cancelled out by an opposition equaliser. The U's to this point had made a 10-game unbeaten start to the campaign, while twelve points had been lost from winning positions.

With Ben Williams making a return to the first-team following injury, back-to-back home defeats followed. First, the U's lost 2–0 to rivals Wycombe Wanderers in the Football League Trophy, before being thrashed 3–0 by Huddersfield Town.

Colchester recorded a point at the Colchester Community Stadium against Oldham Athletic before two wins rounded out October. First, a 2–1 win over Notts County, coming from behind to win following a brace of Kayode Odejayi goals, and then a 2–1 win at Dean Court against Bournemouth, Tom Williams and Ian Henderson the scorers.

=== November ===
November saw Colchester win two five-goal thrillers in the league and a seven-goal thriller in the FA Cup. First, they came from 2–0 down at home after 18-minutes to Leyton Orient to win 3–2, courtesy of Matt Heath, Dave Mooney and Brian Wilson goals. Then, they edged League Two Bradford City 4–3 in the FA Cup in an evenly contested game, Bond and Wilson the scorers with two from Dave Mooney. They lost 2–1 at Swindon Town on 13 November before registering a 3–2 win over Hartlepool United. Ian Henderson scored a 92nd-minute penalty to win the match after earlier Bond and Odejayi goals.

November ended with a 2–0 home defeat by Brentford, before scraping a 1–0 win over non-League side Swindon Supermarine 1–0 in the second round of the FA Cup on 27 November.

=== December ===
Poor weather conditions meant that the U's only played once in the whole of December, a 0–0 draw with Yeovil Town.

=== January ===
With Marc Tierney and Paul Reid sold to Championship clubs Norwich City and Scunthorpe United respectively in the transfer window, and Brian Wilson ruled out for eight-weeks through injury, the U's began 2011 with a completely different back four to the one which started the season.

Colchester drew 3–3 with Charlton Athletic on New Year's Day, with both sides having a man sent off. Heath, Bond and Wordsworth were the U's scorers. They then conceded four goals in each of their next two games, suffering a 4–2 defeat to Leyton Orient, and then losing 4–0 at Swansea City in the third round of the FA Cup.

Striker Steven Gillespie made a return from injury and came off the bench to score both of Colchester's goals in their home win against Bournemouth on 14 January.

On 22 January, Colchester held Huddersfield to a 0–0 draw, before suffering a 2–0 defeat at Brighton & Hove Albion. They saw out January by recording a 2–1 win over Peterborough United having conceded in the first minute of play.

=== February ===
Pat Baldwin was ruled out with an ankle injury for the remainder of the season, prompting Ward to sign Huddersfield's Nathan Clarke on loan, while Mark Cousins replaced Williams in goal following another injury.

Colchester lost 1–0 on 1 February at Charlton after having a genuine goal disallowed. They then lost 1–0 at Hartlepool before returning to winning ways at home to Swindon on 12 February. Colchester's patchy form continued with a 2–0 defeat at Notts County on 15 February, and then registered a 2–0 win against Walsall four days later.

The U's away form was dipping, aside from a 1–1 draw at Peterborough on 22 February. They were then defeated on the road to ten-man Plymouth by 2–1. Only Colchester's home form kept them in touching distance of the play-off places.

=== March ===
Kayode Odejayi became the first Colchester striker to score an away goal in just over one year when they recorded a 1–0 win at Bristol Rovers on 1 March. However, four straight defeats all by ruled out Colchester's chances at reaching the play-offs.

First, they were beaten 2–0 by Southampton at home, followed by a 1–0 defeat at Dagenham & Redbridge. A Sam Baldock hat-trick gave MK Dons a 3–1 win at the Community Stadium, before Tranmere Rovers won 1–0 at Prenton Park. This result left Colchester closer to the relegation zone than the play-offs.

Two home victories ensured the U's moved away from the relegation places, with a 1–0 win over Oldham, before registering their best result of the season, a 5–1 win against nine-man Exeter on 26 March.

=== April ===
Colchester suffered defeat in Sheffield when they lost 2–1 to Wednesday at Hillsborough, but did earn a 1–0 home victory over Rochdale on 9 April. The long trip to Carlisle brought about a 4–1 defeat for the U's, before registering an away point at Brentford.

On 25 April, Colchester earned a point against champions-elect Brighton, but rounded off April with a 4–2 defeat at Yeovil.

=== May ===
In their final game of the season, Colchester faced already-relegated Bristol Rovers and won 2–1 thanks to two an Ian Henderson brace.

== Players ==
As of match played 7 May 2011.

No.	Name	Position	Nationality	Place of birth	Date of birth	Apps	Goals	Signed from	Date signed	Fee
Goalkeepers
1	Ben Williams	GK	(England)	Manchester	27 August 1982 (aged 27)	49	0	(England) Carlisle United	10 July 2009	Undisclosed
12	Mark Cousins	GK	(England)	Chelmsford	9 January 1987 (aged 23)	17	0	Youth team	1 August 2004	Free transfer
35	Carl Pentney	GK	(England)	Colchester	29 December 1989 (aged 20)	0	0	(England) Leicester City	5 August 2010	Free transfer
Defenders
2	Conor Powell	LB	(Republic of Ireland)	Dublin	26 August 1987 (aged 22)	0	0	(Republic of Ireland) Bohemians	7 January 2010	Free transfer
3	Lee Beevers	RB	(Wales)	(England) Doncaster	4 December 1983 (aged 26)	5	0	(England) Lincoln City	26 June 2009	Free transfer
4	Magnus Okuonghae	CB	(England)	(Nigeria) Lagos	16 February 1986 (aged 24)	49	0	(England) Dagenham & Redbridge	1 July 2009	£60,000
5	Pat Baldwin	CB	(England)	City of London	12 November 1982 (aged 27)	223	1	(England) Chelsea	16 August 2002	Free transfer
20	Brian Wilson	FB	(England)	Manchester	9 May 1983 (aged 27)	0	0	(England) Bristol City	29 June 2010	Free transfer
24	Ben Coker	DF/MF	(England)	Hatfield	17 June 1989 (aged 20)	0	0	(England) Bury Town	23 July 2010	Free transfer
25	John White	FB	(England)	Colchester	26 July 1986 (aged 23)	180	0	Youth team	1 July 2003	Free transfer
28	Matt Heath	CB	(England)	Leicester	1 November 1981 (aged 28)	45	1	(England) Leeds United	13 May 2008	Free transfer
30	Morten Knudsen	DF	(Norway)		27 October 1986 (aged 23)	0	0	(Norway) Notodden	20 January 2010	Undisclosed
34	Tom Bender	CB	(England)	Harlow	19 January 1993 (aged 17)	1	0	Youth team	1 July 2009	Free transfer
	Bradley Hamilton	DF	(England)	Newham	30 August 1992 (aged 17)	0	0	Youth team	1 July 2009	Free transfer
Midfielders
8	John-Joe O'Toole	MF	(Republic of Ireland)	(England) Harrow	30 September 1988 (aged 21)	33	3	(England) Watford	1 January 2010	Undisclosed
10	Kemal Izzet	MF	(England)	Whitechapel	29 September 1980 (aged 29)	376	21	(England) Charlton Athletic	13 April 2001	Free transfer
14	Andy Bond	MF	(England)	Wigan	16 March 1986 (aged 24)	0	0	(England) Barrow	29 June 2010	Free transfer
17	David Perkins	MF	(England)	Heysham	21 June 1982 (aged 27)	50	7	(England) Rochdale	8 July 2008	Undisclosed
22	Anthony Wordsworth	MF	(England)	Camden Town	3 January 1989 (aged 21)	84	14	Youth team	1 July 2006	Free transfer
26	Lloyd James	MF/FB	(Wales)	(England) Bristol	16 February 1988 (aged 22)	0	0	(England) Southampton	22 July 2010	Free transfer
32	Sam Corcoran	MF	(England)	Enfield Town	5 February 1991 (aged 19)	1	0	Youth team	31 March 2009	Free transfer
33	Jordan Sanderson	MF	(England)	Chingford	7 August 1993 (aged 16)	0	0	Youth team	1 January 2011	Free transfer
Forwards
7	Ashley Vincent	WG	(England)	Oldbury	26 May 1985 (aged 25)	27	4	(England) Cheltenham Town	1 July 2009	Free transfer
11	Simon Hackney	WG	(England)	Manchester	5 February 1984 (aged 26)	39	3	(England) Carlisle United	26 January 2009	£100,000
15	Kayode Odejayi	FW	(Nigeria)	Ibadan	21 February 1982 (aged 28)	31	10	(England) Barnsley	1 January 2010	Undisclosed
16	Ian Henderson	FW/MF	(England)	Bury St Edmunds	24 January 1985 (aged 25)	13	2	(Turkey) Ankaragücü	7 January 2010	Free transfer
18	Steven Gillespie	FW	(England)	Liverpool	4 June 1985 (aged 24)	53	7	(England) Cheltenham Town	7 July 2008	£400,000
21	Medy Elito	WG	(England)	(Zaire) Kinshasa	20 March 1990 (aged 20)	23	1	Youth team	1 July 2007	Free transfer
	Craig Arnott	FW	(England)	Edgware	9 September 1992 (aged 17)	0	0	Youth team	1 July 2009	Free transfer

== Transfers ==
=== In ===
Date	Position	Nationality	Name	From	Fee	Ref.
29 June 2010	MF	(England)	Andy Bond	(England) Barrow	Free transfer	
29 June 2010	FB	(England)	Brian Wilson	(England) Bristol City	Free transfer	
22 July 2010	MF/FB	(Wales)	Lloyd James	(England) Southampton	Free transfer	
23 July 2010	DF/MF	(England)	Ben Coker	(England) Bury Town	Free transfer	
5 August 2010	GK	(England)	Carl Pentney	(England) Leicester City	Free transfer	
1 January 2011	MF	(England)	Jordan Sanderson	Youth team	Free transfer	
7 January 2011	LB	(Republic of Ireland)	Conor Powell	(Republic of Ireland) Bohemians	Free transfer	

- Total spending: ▼ ~ £0

=== Out ===
Date	Position	Nationality	Name	To	Fee	Ref.
31 May 2010	RB	(England)	Philip Ifil	(England) Dagenham & Redbridge	Released	
3 June 2010	MF	(England)	David Fox	(England) Norwich City	Free transfer	
29 June 2010	MF	(England)	David Prutton	(England) Swindon Town	Released	
30 June 2010	LB	(England)	Matt Lockwood	(Scotland) Dundee	Free transfer	
30 June 2010	MF/FW	(England)	Russell Malton	Free agent	Released	
30 June 2010	FB	(Republic of Ireland)	Alan Maybury	(Scotland) St Johnstone	Released	
26 July 2010	FW	(England)	Scott Vernon	(Scotland) Aberdeen	Released	
29 July 2010	FW	(England)	Clive Platt	(England) Coventry City	Undisclosed	
31 July 2010	FW	(France)	Joël Thomas	(Scotland) Hamilton Academical	Released	
13 January 2010	FB	(England)	Marc Tierney	(England) Norwich City	Undisclosed	
14 January 2010	CB	(England)	Paul Reid	(England) Scunthorpe United	Undisclosed	

- Total incoming: ▲ ~ £0

=== Loans in ===
Date	Position	Nationality	Name	From	End date	Ref.
5 August 2010	ST	(Republic of Ireland)	Dave Mooney	(England) Reading	31 May 2011	
14 September 2010	CF	(England)	Liam Henderson	(England) Watford	4 January 2011	
30 September 2010	LB	(Cyprus)	Tom Williams	(England) Bristol City	31 December 2010	
14 January 2011	AM/CF	(Iceland)	Matthías Vilhjálmsson	(Iceland) FH	3 March 2011	
27 January 2011	CB	(England)	Nathan Clarke	(England) Huddersfield Town	31 May 2011	
17 March 2011	CB	(New Zealand)	Tommy Smith	(England) Ipswich Town	31 May 2011	

=== Loans out ===
Date	Position	Nationality	Name	To	End date	Ref.
1 August 2010	DF/MF	(England)	Ben Coker	(England) Chelmsford City	31 December 2010	
5 November 2010	GK	(England)	Carl Pentney	(England) Bath City	5 January 2011	
12 November 2010	WG	(England)	Medy Elito	(England) Dagenham & Redbridge	12 February 2011	
31 January 2011	WG	(England)	Simon Hackney	(England) Oxford United	31 May 2011	
25 February 2011	WG	(England)	Medy Elito	(England) Cheltenham Town	22 March 2011	
10 March 2011	MF	(England)	Sam Corcoran	(England) Lowestoft Town	7 April 2011	
10 March 2011	GK	(England)	Carl Pentney	(England) Chelmsford City	31 May 2011	

== Match details ==
=== League One ===
==== League table ====
Pos	Team	Pld	W	D	L	GF	GA	GD	Pts
8	Exeter City	46	20	10	16	66	73	−7	70
9	Rochdale	46	18	14	14	63	55	+8	68
10	Colchester United	46	16	14	16	57	63	−6	62
11	Brentford	46	17	10	19	55	62	−7	61
12	Carlisle United	46	16	11	19	60	62	−2	59

Updated to match(es) played on 2 May 2011. Source: BBC
Rules for classification: 1) points; 2) goal difference; 3) number of goals scored.

==== Results round by round ====
Round	1	2	3	4	5	6	7	8	9	10	11	12	13	14	15	16	17	18	19	20	21	22	23	24	25	26	27	28	29	30	31	32	33	34	35	36	37	38	39	40	41	42	43	44	45	46
Ground	A	H	A	H	A	H	A	H	H	A	H	A	H	A	H	A	H	H	H	H	A	H	A	A	H	A	A	H	A	H	A	A	A	H	A	H	A	H	H	A	H	A	A	H	A	H
Result	D	D	W	D	W	D	D	W	D	D	L	D	W	W	W	L	W	L	D	D	L	W	D	L	W	L	L	W	L	W	D	L	W	L	L	L	L	W	W	L	W	L	D	D	L	W
Position	11	14	9	7	5	8	9	5	6	6	11	10	6	3	3	6	3	6	6	10	11	7	10	11	9	9	10	10	11	10	9	10	7	8	10	12	14	10	9	11	9	11	11	12	12	10

Source: Statto.com (archived)
A = Away; H = Home; W = Win; D = Draw; L = Loss

==== Matches ====
7 August 2010 1	Exeter City	2–2	Colchester United	Exeter
15:00 BST	Harley 7' (pen.); Logan 87'	Report	Wordsworth 10', 11'	Stadium: St James Park; Attendance: 5,927; Referee: Phil Gibbs

14 August 2010 2	Colchester United	1–1	Sheffield Wednesday	Colchester
15:00 BST	Bond 50'	Report	Mellor 83'	Stadium: Colchester Community Stadium; Attendance: 6,011; Referee: David Phillips

21 August 2010 3	Rochdale	1–2	Colchester United	Rochdale
15:00 BST	Dawson 47'	Report	Bond 38'; I. Henderson 84'	Stadium: Spotland Stadium; Attendance: 3,016; Referee: Nigel Miller

27 August 2010 4	Colchester United	1–1	Carlisle United	Colchester
19:45 BST	Mooney 29'	Report	Thirlwell 90+3'	Stadium: Colchester Community Stadium; Attendance: 4,475; Referee: Gavin Ward

4 September 2010 5	Walsall	0–1	Colchester United	Walsall
15:00 BST		Report	Bond 83'	Stadium: Bescot Stadium; Attendance: 3,416; Referee: Karl Evans

11 September 2010 6	Colchester United	1–1	Plymouth Argyle	Colchester
15:00 BST	Bond 22'	Report	Johnson 48'; Molyneux (yellow card) 86' (red card)	Stadium: Colchester Community Stadium; Attendance: 4,201; Referee: Danny McDermid

18 September 2010 7	Southampton	0–0	Colchester United	Southampton
15:00 BST		Report		Stadium: St Mary's Stadium; Attendance: 17,857; Referee: Graham Horwood

25 September 2010 8	Colchester United	3–1	Tranmere Rovers	Colchester
15:00 BST	Mooney 6'; Wordsworth 15'; Okuonghae 30'	Report	Showunmi 81'	Stadium: Colchester Community Stadium; Attendance: 3,637; Referee: P Crossley

28 September 2010 9	Colchester United	2–2	Dagenham & Redbridge	Colchester
19:45 BST	Vincent 43'; Mooney 65'	Report	Savage 15'; Vincelot 72'	Stadium: Colchester Community Stadium; Attendance: 4,515; Referee: Keith Hill

2 October 2010 10	Milton Keynes Dons	1–1	Colchester United	Milton Keynes
15:00 BST	Balanta 66'	Report	Okuonghae 26'	Stadium: Stadium MK; Attendance: 11,280; Referee: Mick Russell

9 October 2010 11	Colchester United	0–3	Huddersfield Town	Colchester
15:00 BST		Report	Novak 34'; Pilkington 42'; Rhodes 78'; Croft (yellow card) 82' (red card)	Stadium: Colchester Community Stadium; Attendance: 4,211; Referee: Pat Miller

16 October 2010 12	Oldham Athletic	0–0	Colchester United	Oldham
15:00 BST		Report		Stadium: Boundary Park; Attendance: 4,136; Referee: Peter Quinn

23 October 2010 13	Colchester United	2–1	Notts County	Colchester
15:00 BST	Odejayi 76', 83'	Report	Westcarr 8'	Stadium: Colchester Community Stadium; Attendance: 3,811; Referee: Darren Sheldrake

30 October 2010 14	AFC Bournemouth	1–2	Colchester United	Bournemouth
15:00 BST	Fletcher 87'	Report	T. Williams 18'; I. Henderson 80'	Stadium: Dean Court; Attendance: 6,575; Referee: Simon Hooper

2 November 2010 15	Colchester United	3–2	Leyton Orient	Colchester
19:45 GMT	Heath 22'; Mooney 32' (pen.); Wilson 80'	Report	Revell 10', 18'	Stadium: Colchester Community Stadium; Attendance: 3,899; Referee: Grant Hegley

13 November 2010 16	Swindon Town	2–1	Colchester United	Swindon
15:00 GMT	Dossevi 29'; Austin 54'	Report	Vincent 45'	Stadium: County Ground; Attendance: 7,679; Referee: Rob Lewis

20 November 2010 17	Colchester United	3–2	Hartlepool United	Colchester
15:00 GMT	Bond 58'; Odejayi 60'; I. Henderson 90+2' (pen.)	Report	Murray 28'; Horwood 88'	Stadium: Colchester Community Stadium; Attendance: 3,640; Referee: Oliver Langford

23 November 2010 18	Colchester United	0–2	Brentford	Colchester
19:45 GMT		Report	Alexander 26'; MacDonald 90'	Stadium: Colchester Community Stadium; Attendance: 3,172; Referee: David Foster

4 December 2010	Brighton & Hove Albion	P–P	Colchester United	Brighton
15:00 GMT		Report		Stadium: Withdean Stadium
Note: Match postponed due to snowy conditions on Friday 3 December

11 December 2010 19	Colchester United	0–0	Yeovil Town	Colchester
15:00 GMT		Report		Stadium: Colchester Community Stadium; Attendance: 3,748; Referee: Steve Rushton

18 December 2010	Bristol Rovers	P–P	Colchester United	Bristol
15:00 GMT		Report		Stadium: Memorial Stadium
Note: Match postponed due to snow

26 December 2010	Peterborough United	P–P	Colchester United	Peterborough
15:00 GMT		Report		Stadium: London Road Stadium
Note: Match postponed due to a frozen pitch on Friday 24 December

28 December 2010	Colchester United	P–P	Oldham Athletic	Colchester
15:00 GMT		Report		Stadium: Colchester Community Stadium
Note: Match postponed due to a frozen pitch on Monday 27 December

1 January 2011 20	Colchester United	3–3	Charlton Athletic	Colchester
15:00 GMT	Heath 16'; Bond 24'; Wordsworth 64'; Perkins (red card) 39'	Report	Jackson 18' (pen.), 40' (pen.); Benson 76' (red card) 88'	Stadium: Colchester Community Stadium; Attendance: 6,112; Referee: Nigel Miller

3 January 2011 21	Leyton Orient	4–2	Colchester United	Leyton
15:00 GMT	Smith 41'; Revell 49'; M'Poku 75'; Téhoué 86'	Report	Wordsworth 69'; I. Henderson 81'	Stadium: Brisbane Road; Attendance: 4,339; Referee: Danny McDermid

14 January 2011 22	Colchester United	2–1	AFC Bournemouth	Colchester
19:45 GMT	Gillespie 77', 84'	Report	Fletcher 54'	Stadium: Colchester Community Stadium; Attendance: 3,445; Referee: Darren Deadman

22 January 2011 23	Huddersfield Town	0–0	Colchester United	Huddersfield
15:00 GMT		Report		Stadium: Kirklees Stadium; Attendance: 12,689; Referee: Gavin Ward

25 January 2011 24	Brighton & Hove Albion	2–0	Colchester United	Brighton
19:45 GMT	Calderón 45'; Noone 76'	Report	Baldwin (yellow card) 86' (red card)	Stadium: Withdean Stadium; Attendance: 6,798; Referee: Graham Scott

28 January 2011 25	Colchester United	2–1	Peterborough United	Colchester
19:45 GMT	Gillespie 37'; Mooney 86'	Report	Rowe 1'	Stadium: Colchester Community Stadium; Attendance: 4,645; Referee: P Crossley

1 February 2011 26	Charlton Athletic	1–0	Colchester United	Charlton
19:45 GMT	Wright-Phillips 78'	Report		Stadium: The Valley; Attendance: 13,830; Referee: Darren Sheldrake

5 February 2011 27	Hartlepool United	1–0	Colchester United	Hartlepool
15:00 GMT	Sweeney 88'	Report		Stadium: Victoria Park; Attendance: 2,646; Referee: Trevor Kettle

12 February 2011 28	Colchester United	2–1	Swindon Town	Colchester
15:00 GMT	Mooney 7' (pen.); Gillespie 90+3'	Report	Cuthbert 51'	Stadium: Colchester Community Stadium; Attendance: 3,624; Referee: Graham Salisbury

15 February 2011 29	Notts County	2–0	Colchester United	Nottingham
19:45 GMT	Westcarr 21'; Clarke 37' (o.g.)	Report		Stadium: Meadow Lane; Attendance: 4,041; Referee: Colin Webster

19 February 2011 30	Colchester United	2–0	Walsall	Colchester
15:00 GMT	Perkins 18'; Mooney 56' (pen.)	Report		Stadium: Colchester Community Stadium; Attendance: 3,439; Referee: Mick Russell

22 February 2011 31	Peterborough United	1–1	Colchester United	Peterborough
19:45 GMT	Boyd 6'	Report	I. Henderson 17'	Stadium: London Road Stadium; Attendance: 5,758; Referee: Darren Drysdale

26 February 2011 32	Plymouth Argyle	2–1	Colchester United	Plymouth
15:00 GMT	Fallon 8'; Bolasie 74' (pen.); Clark (red card) 58'	Report	Zubar 41' (o.g.)	Stadium: Home Park; Attendance: 8,982; Referee: Oliver Langford

1 March 2011 33	Bristol Rovers	0–1	Colchester United	Bristol
19:45 GMT		Report	Odejayi 22'	Stadium: Memorial Stadium; Attendance: 5,181; Referee: Michael Naylor

5 March 2011 34	Colchester United	0–2	Southampton	Colchester
15:00 GMT	Mooney (red card) 32'	Report	Oxlade-Chamberlain 30'; Hammond 50'	Stadium: Colchester Community Stadium; Attendance: 6,523; Referee: Phil Gibbs

8 March 2011 35	Dagenham & Redbridge	1–0	Colchester United	Dagenham
19:45 GMT	Savage 11'	Report		Stadium: Victoria Road; Attendance: 2,140; Referee: Gavin Ward

12 March 2011 36	Colchester United	1–3	Milton Keynes Dons	Colchester
15:00 GMT	Gillespie 28'	Report	Baldock 48', 62', 86'	Stadium: Colchester Community Stadium; Attendance: 4,103; Referee: Chris Sarginson

19 March 2011 37	Tranmere Rovers	1–0	Colchester United	Birkenhead
15:00 GMT	Showunmi 63'	Report		Stadium: Prenton Park; Attendance: 4,292; Referee: Andy Woolmer

22 March 2011 38	Colchester United	1–0	Oldham Athletic	Colchester
19:45 GMT	Vincent 52'	Report		Stadium: Colchester Community Stadium; Attendance: 2,892; Referee: James Linington

26 March 2011 39	Colchester United	5–1	Exeter City	Colchester
13:00 GMT	Gillespie 31', 77'; Mooney 73' (pen.); Vincent 76'; Bond 86'	Report	Nardiello 21'; Tully (red card) 36'; Golbourne (red card) 72'	Stadium: Colchester Community Stadium; Attendance: 3,629; Referee: Karl Evans

2 April 2011 40	Sheffield Wednesday	2–1	Colchester United	Sheffield
15:00 BST	Mellor 25', 51'	Report	Gillespie 90'	Stadium: Hillsborough Stadium; Attendance: 15,663; Referee: Scott Mathieson

9 April 2011 41	Colchester United	1–0	Rochdale	Colchester
15:00 BST	I. Henderson 87'	Report		Stadium: Colchester Community Stadium; Attendance: 4,052; Referee: Roger East

16 April 2011 42	Carlisle United	4–1	Colchester United	Carlisle
15:00 BST	Berrett 9'; Curran 26', 61'; Noble 31'	Report	Gillespie 71'	Stadium: Brunton Park; Attendance: 4,405; Referee: Peter Quinn

22 April 2011 43	Brentford	1–1	Colchester United	Brentford
15:00 BST	Saunders 76'	Report	I. Henderson 15'	Stadium: Griffin Park; Attendance: 4,480; Referee: Graham Horwood

25 April 2011 44	Colchester United	1–1	Brighton & Hove Albion	Colchester
12:15 BST	I. Henderson 16'	Report	Barnes 72'	Stadium: Colchester Community Stadium; Attendance: 5,132; Referee: Keith Stroud

30 April 2011 45	Yeovil Town	4–2	Colchester United	Yeovil
15:00 BST	Alcock 15'; Tutte 22'; Bowditch 44'; Welsh 64'	Report	Vincent 43'; Mooney 63'	Stadium: Huish Park; Attendance: 3,797; Referee: Oliver Langford

7 May 2011 46	Colchester United	2–1	Bristol Rovers	Colchester
15:00 BST	I. Henderson 28', 30'	Report	Richards 72'	Stadium: Colchester Community Stadium; Attendance: 4,759; Referee: David Webb

=== Football League Cup ===
10 August 2010 1st round	Hereford United	0–3	Colchester United	Hereford
19:45 BST		Report	Mooney 40', 44'; I. Henderson 65'	Stadium: Edgar Street; Attendance: 1,996; Referee: Chris Sarginson

24 August 2010 2nd round	Sunderland	2–0	Colchester United	Sunderland
19:45 BST	Bent 19', 37'	Report		Stadium: Stadium of Light; Attendance: 13,532; Referee: Scott Mathieson

=== Football League Trophy ===
5 October 2010 2nd round (southern section)	Colchester United	0–2	Wycombe Wanderers	Colchester
19:30 BST		Report	Betsy 75'; Davies 82'	Stadium: Colchester Community Stadium; Attendance: 2,379; Referee: Andy Woolmer

=== FA Cup ===
6 November 2010 1st round	Colchester United	4–3	Bradford City	Colchester
15:00 GMT	Bond 7'; Mooney 30', 64' (pen.); Wilson 54'	Report	Hanson 8', 79'; Syers 32'	Stadium: Colchester Community Stadium; Attendance: 2,736; Referee: Iain Williamson

28 November 2010 2nd round	Colchester United	1–0	Swindon Supermarine	Colchester
15:00 GMT	Mooney 21'	Report		Stadium: Colchester Community Stadium; Attendance: 3,047; Referee: David Phillips

8 January 2011 3rd round	Swansea City	4–0	Colchester United	Swansea
15:00 GMT	Monk 25'; Pratley 35'; Van der Gun 68'; Sinclair 82'	Report		Stadium: Liberty Stadium; Attendance: 7,005; Referee: Rob Shoebridge

== Squad statistics ==
=== Appearances and goals ===
No.	Pos	Nat	Player	Total		League One		FA Cup		League Cup		Football League Trophy	
No.	Pos	Nat	Player	Apps	Goals	Apps	Goals	Apps	Goals	Apps	Goals	Apps	Goals
1	GK	(England) ENG	Ben Williams	37	0	33	0	3	0	0	0	1	0
2	DF	(Republic of Ireland) IRL	Conor Powell	2	0	2	0	0	0	0	0	0	0
3	DF	(Wales) WAL	Lee Beevers	21	0	12+7	0	1	0	0+1	0	0	0
4	DF	(England) ENG	Magnus Okuonghae	17	2	14	2	0	0	2	0	1	0
5	DF	(England) ENG	Pat Baldwin	13	0	10+1	0	1	0	1	0	0	0
7	FW	(England) ENG	Ashley Vincent	42	5	28+9	5	2	0	0+2	0	1	0
8	MF	(Republic of Ireland) IRL	John-Joe O'Toole	11	0	5+6	0	0	0	0	0	0	0
10	MF	(England) ENG	Kemal Izzet	47	0	38+3	0	3	0	2	0	1	0
11	FW	(England) ENG	Simon Hackney	2	0	0+1	0	0+1	0	0	0	0	0
12	GK	(England) ENG	Mark Cousins	16	0	13+1	0	0	0	2	0	0	0
14	MF	(England) ENG	Andy Bond	46	8	36+7	7	2	1	1	0	0	0
15	FW	(Nigeria) NGA	Kayode Odejayi	50	4	18+26	4	2+1	0	1+1	0	0+1	0
16	FW	(England) ENG	Ian Henderson	41	11	24+12	10	2	0	2	1	1	0
17	MF	(England) ENG	David Perkins	41	1	36	1	3	0	2	0	0	0
18	FW	(England) ENG	Steven Gillespie	19	9	11+7	9	0	0	0	0	0+1	0
20	DF	(England) ENG	Brian Wilson	30	2	25+1	1	2	1	2	0	0	0
21	FW	(England) ENG	Medy Elito	1	0	0	0	0	0	0+1	0	0	0
22	MF	(England) ENG	Anthony Wordsworth	41	5	26+9	5	1+2	0	2	0	1	0
24	DF	(England) ENG	Ben Coker	20	0	20	0	0	0	0	0	0	0
25	DF	(England) ENG	John White	25	0	15+7	0	1	0	1	0	1	0
26	MF	(Wales) WAL	Lloyd James	32	0	17+11	0	0+1	0	1+1	0	1	0
28	DF	(England) ENG	Matt Heath	30	2	26+1	2	2	0	0	0	1	0
33	MF	(England) ENG	Jordan Sanderson	1	0	0+1	0	0	0	0	0	0	0
34	DF	(Wales) WAL	Tom Bender	1	0	0	0	0	0	0	0	0+1	0
Players who appeared for Colchester who left during the season
6	DF	(England) ENG	Nathan Clarke	18	0	18	0	0	0	0	0	0	0
6	DF	(England) ENG	Paul Reid	22	0	17+1	0	3	0	1	0	0	0
19	FW	(Republic of Ireland) IRL	Dave Mooney	44	14	37+2	9	3	3	1	2	1	0
23	DF	(England) ENG	Marc Tierney	15	0	12+1	0	0+1	0	1	0	0	0
27	FW	(England) ENG	Liam Henderson	11	0	0+8	0	0+2	0	0	0	1	0
27	MF	(Iceland) ISL	Matthías Vilhjálmsson	3	0	0+3	0	0	0	0	0	0	0
31	DF	(New Zealand) NZL	Tommy Smith	6	0	6	0	0	0	0	0	0	0
31	DF	(Cyprus) CYP	Tom Williams	9	1	7	1	2	0	0	0	0	0

=== Goalscorers ===
Place	Number	Nationality	Position	Name	League One	FA Cup	League Cup	Football League Trophy	Total
1	19	(Republic of Ireland)	ST	Dave Mooney	9	3	2	0	14
2	16	(England)	FW/MF	Ian Henderson	10	0	1	0	11
3	18	(England)	FW	Steven Gillespie	9	0	0	0	9
4	14	(England)	MF	Andy Bond	7	1	0	0	8
5	7	(England)	WG	Ashley Vincent	5	0	0	0	5
5	22	(England)	MF	Anthony Wordsworth	5	0	0	0	5
7	15	(Nigeria)	FW	Kayode Odejayi	4	0	0	0	4
8	4	(England)	CB	Magnus Okuonghae	2	0	0	0	2
8	20	(England)	FB	Brian Wilson	1	1	0	0	2
8	28	(England)	CB	Matt Heath	2	0	0	0	2
11	17	(England)	MF	David Perkins	1	0	0	0	1
11	31	(Cyprus)	LB	Tom Williams	1	0	0	0	1
				Own goals	1	0	0	0	1
				TOTALS	57	5	3	0	65

=== Disciplinary record ===
Number	Nationality	Position	Name	League One		FA Cup		League Cup		Football League Trophy		Total	
Number	Nationality	Position	Name	Booked	Sent off (straight red)	Booked	Sent off (straight red)	Booked	Sent off (straight red)	Booked	Sent off (straight red)	Booked	Sent off (straight red)
17	(England)	MF	David Perkins	6	1	0	0	0	0	0	0	6	1
19	(Republic of Ireland)	ST	Dave Mooney	5	1	1	0	0	0	0	0	6	1
10	(England)	MF	Kemal Izzet	6	0	1	0	0	0	0	0	7	0
22	(England)	MF	Anthony Wordsworth	6	0	0	0	0	0	0	0	6	0
5	(England)	CB	Pat Baldwin	2	1	0	0	0	0	0	0	2	1
16	(England)	FW/MF	Ian Henderson	4	0	0	0	1	0	0	0	5	0
15	(Nigeria)	FW	Kayode Odejayi	4	0	0	0	0	0	0	0	4	0
20	(England)	FB	Brian Wilson	4	0	0	0	0	0	0	0	4	0
25	(England)	FB	John White	2	0	1	0	0	0	1	0	4	0
26	(Wales)	MF/FB	Lloyd James	4	0	0	0	0	0	0	0	4	0
3	(Wales)	RB	Lee Beevers	3	0	0	0	0	0	0	0	3	0
6	(England)	CB	Nathan Clarke	3	0	0	0	0	0	0	0	3	0
24	(England)	DF/MF	Ben Coker	3	0	0	0	0	0	0	0	3	0
28	(England)	CB	Matt Heath	3	0	0	0	0	0	0	0	3	0
6	(England)	CB	Paul Reid	2	0	0	0	0	0	0	0	2	0
7	(England)	WG	Ashley Vincent	2	0	0	0	0	0	0	0	2	0
1	(England)	GK	Ben Williams	0	0	1	0	0	0	0	0	1	0
4	(England)	CB	Magnus Okuonghae	1	0	0	0	0	0	0	0	1	0
14	(England)	MF	Andy Bond	1	0	0	0	0	0	0	0	1	0
18	(England)	FW	Steven Gillespie	1	0	0	0	0	0	0	0	1	0
27	(England)	CF	Liam Henderson	0	0	1	0	0	0	0	0	1	0
31	(New Zealand)	CB	Tommy Smith	1	0	0	0	0	0	0	0	1	0
			TOTALS	63	3	5	0	1	0	1	0	70	3

=== Captains ===
Number of games played as team captain.

Place	Number	Nationality	Position	Player	League One	FA Cup	League Cup	Football League Trophy	Total
1	10	(England)	MF	Kemal Izzet	37	3	2	1	43
2	6	(England)	CB	Paul Reid	4	0	0	0	4
3	28	(England)	CB	Matt Heath	3	0	0	0	3
4	17	(England)	MF	David Perkins	1	0	0	0	1
				Not recorded	1	0	0	0	1
				TOTALS	46	3	2	1	51

=== Clean sheets ===
Number of games goalkeepers kept a clean sheet.

Place	Number	Nationality	Player	League One	FA Cup	League Cup	Football League Trophy	Total
1	1	(England)	Ben Williams	7	1	0	0	8
2	12	(England)	Mark Cousins	2	0	1	0	3
			TOTALS	9	1	1	0	11

=== Player debuts ===
Players making their first-team Colchester United debut in a fully competitive match.

Number	Position	Nationality	Player	Date	Opponent	Ground	Notes
14	MF	(England)	Andy Bond	7 August 2010	Exeter City	St James Park	
19	ST	(Republic of Ireland)	Dave Mooney	7 August 2010	Exeter City	St James Park	
20	FB	(England)	Brian Wilson	7 August 2010	Exeter City	St James Park	
26	MF/FB	(Wales)	Lloyd James	10 August 2010	Hereford United	Edgar Street	
27	CF	(England)	Liam Henderson	25 September 2010	Tranmere Rovers	Colchester Community Stadium	
31	LB	(Cyprus)	Tom Williams	2 October 2010	Milton Keynes Dons	Stadium MK	
24	DF/MF	(England)	Ben Coker	14 January 2011	AFC Bournemouth	Colchester Community Stadium	
27	AM/CF	(Iceland)	Matthías Vilhjálmsson	25 January 2011	Brighton & Hove Albion	Withdean Stadium	
6	CB	(England)	Nathan Clarke	28 January 2011	Peterborough United	Colchester Community Stadium	
31	CB	(New Zealand)	Tommy Smith	19 March 2011	Tranmere Rovers	Prenton Park	
2	LB	(Republic of Ireland)	Conor Powell	22 April 2011	Brentford	Griffin Park	
33	MF	(England)	Jordan Sanderson	7 May 2011	Bristol Rovers	Colchester Community Stadium	

== See also ==
- List of Colchester United F.C. seasons
