= Steven Gillespie =

English footballer (born 1985)

Personal information
- Date of birth: 4 June 1985 (age 41)
- Place of birth: Liverpool, England
- Height: 5 ft 9 in (1.75 m)
- Position: Striker

Youth career
- 2001–2004: Liverpool

Senior career*
Years	Team	Apps	(Gls)
2004–2006	Bristol City	12	(1)
2005	→ Cheltenham Town (loan)	12	(5)
2005–2006	→ Cheltenham Town (loan)	9	(3)
2006–2008	Cheltenham Town	67	(21)
2008–2012	Colchester United	98	(25)
2012–2014	Fleetwood Town	22	(4)
2013–2014	→ Cheltenham Town (loan)	4	(1)
2014	Bristol Rovers	13	(1)
2014–2015	Altrincham	22	(1)
2015–2017	Warrington Town	0	(0)
2017	→ Skelmersdale United (loan)	11	(0)
Total		270	(62)
- * Club domestic league appearances and goals

Steven Gillespie (born 4 June 1985) is an English retired footballer who played as a striker. He is currently a programme manager for the Liverpool International Academy.

== Career ==
=== Early career ===
Born in Liverpool, Merseyside, Gillespie began his career as a trainee for Liverpool.

Gillespie began his career with Liverpool having carved out a name for himself as a goalscorer in schoolboy football. He broke Robbie Fowler's goal-scoring record for Liverpool Schools; he later had his record broken by Wayne Rooney.

=== Bristol City ===
In 2004, having had few opportunities at Liverpool, he was released and was quickly signed by Bristol City, of League One.

=== Cheltenham Town ===
He continued to find himself without many chances and later in 2004 was sent on-loan to Cheltenham Town of League Two, where he scored four goals in five appearances. Gillespie once again joined Cheltenham on loan at the end of the 2004–05 season, and again in the first half of the 2005–2006 season, scoring a further five goals. He signed a permanent two-and-a-half-year contract in January 2006, for an undisclosed fee.

Despite signing a new contract in August 2007, Gillespie handed in a transfer request in the summer of 2008 after having an impressive season with Cheltenham as they finished in mid-table in League One. Less than a week after handing in the request, Gillespie was sold to fellow League One club Colchester United for a fee of £400,000.

=== Colchester United ===
On 7 July 2008, Gillespie signed for Colchester following a successful season with Cheltenham in which he scored 16 goals. It was a club record signing, as the U's looked to bounce back to the Championship.

Unfortunately for both Gillespie and Colchester, however, his time with the club was dogged by injuries from shortly after his arrival, despite having made a promising start with three goals from his first three outings.

His first season in Essex continued to be stop-start and, although when he managed to play he continued to show his natural, goalscoring instinct and displayed this in scoring five goals in his little time spent on the pitch, he struggled to rack up game time and barely managed a ninety-minute performance. This was compounded when, in the 5–0 home win over Carlisle he managed just sixteen minutes in his return from injury before having to go off injured once more.

The season was a huge shame for Gillespie who would have wished to make a much more impressive impact on his arrival as the club's record signing. Under Aidy Boothroyd in the 2009/10 season he struggled to break into the team despite seemingly having gotten over the worst of his injury troubles and it was not until the final season of his contract that Gillespie's ability finally came to the fore.

With John Ward now the U's manager, his former Cheltenham Town boss eased him back into the U's team after the Christmas period and Gillespie flourished, bagging nine goals in ten starts as well as having a legitimate goal chalked out in a 0–1 defeat at Charlton.

Gillespie committed his future to Colchester for another two years on 17 May 2011 and was given the number nine shirt for the 2011–12 season. During the campaign, he finished with 11 goals in League One, which was his best return in a football season for Colchester. He finished with 12 goals in all competitions.

=== Fleetwood Town ===
Gillespie signed for newly promoted League Two outfit Fleetwood Town on 18 June 2012. On 30 January 2014, Gillespie was released from Fleetwood Town.

=== Return to Cheltenham Town ===
Gillespie returned to Cheltenham Town on loan from Fleetwood on 15 August 2013, making his second debut for the club two days later in their 3–1 home defeat to Plymouth Argyle.

=== Bristol Rovers ===
On 6 February 2014, Gillespie joined up with John Ward again, following spells at Cheltenham Town and Colchester United. He scored his first goal for Rovers with an 88th-minute equaliser against Scunthorpe United after coming on as a 53rd minute substitution for the injured Alan Gow. He made his first start for the club 1 month later in a goalless draw with Southend United.

=== Altrincham ===
Gillespie joined newly promoted Conference Premier team Altrincham on 19 July 2014.

=== Skelmersdale United ===
Gillespie joined Northern Premier League team Skelmersdale United on loan on 12 February 2017. He made 11 appearances as well as being a part of the United coaching setup.

== Coaching career ==
Following his retirement, Gillespie returned to first club Liverpool, working as a coach for the International Academy. He later became a programme manager, running training camps in the likes of South Africa and the United States.

== Career statistics ==
Appearances and goals by club, season and competition
Club	Season	League			FA Cup		League Cup		Other		Total	
Club	Season	Division	Apps	Goals	Apps	Goals	Apps	Goals	Apps	Goals	Apps	Goals
Bristol City	2004–05	League One	8	0	1	0	1	0	2	0	12	0
Bristol City	2005–06	League One	4	1	1	0	0	0	0	0	5	1
Bristol City	Total		12	1	2	0	1	0	2	0	17	1
Cheltenham Town (loan)	2004–05	League Two	12	5	0	0	0	0	0	0	12	5
Cheltenham Town (loan)	2005–06	League Two	9	3	0	0	0	0	3	2	12	5
Cheltenham Town	2005–06	League Two	7	2	0	0	0	0	0	0	7	2
Cheltenham Town	2006–07	League One	23	5	0	0	1	0	0	0	24	5
Cheltenham Town	2007–08	League One	37	14	2	2	0	0	1	0	40	16
Cheltenham Town	Total		67	21	2	2	1	0	1	0	71	23
Colchester United	2008–09	League One	17	4	0	0	1	1	2	0	20	5
Colchester United	2009–10	League One	30	1	3	1	0	0	0	0	33	2
Colchester United	2010–11	League One	18	9	0	0	0	0	1	0	19	9
Colchester United	2011–12	League One	32	11	1	0	1	1	1	0	35	12
Colchester United	Total		98	25	4	1	2	2	4	0	108	28
Fleetwood Town	2012–13	League Two	22	4	1	0	1	0	1	0	25	4
Cheltenham Town (loan)	2013–14	League Two	4	0	0	0	0	0	1	2	5	2
Bristol Rovers	2013–14	League Two	13	1	0	0	0	0	0	0	10	1
Altrincham	2014–15	Conference Premier	22	1	0	0	—		0	0	22	1
Career total			256	61	9	3	5	2	12	2	282	70

== Honours ==
Cheltenham Town

- Football League Two play-offs: 2006
