= Carl Pentney =

British footballer (born 1989)

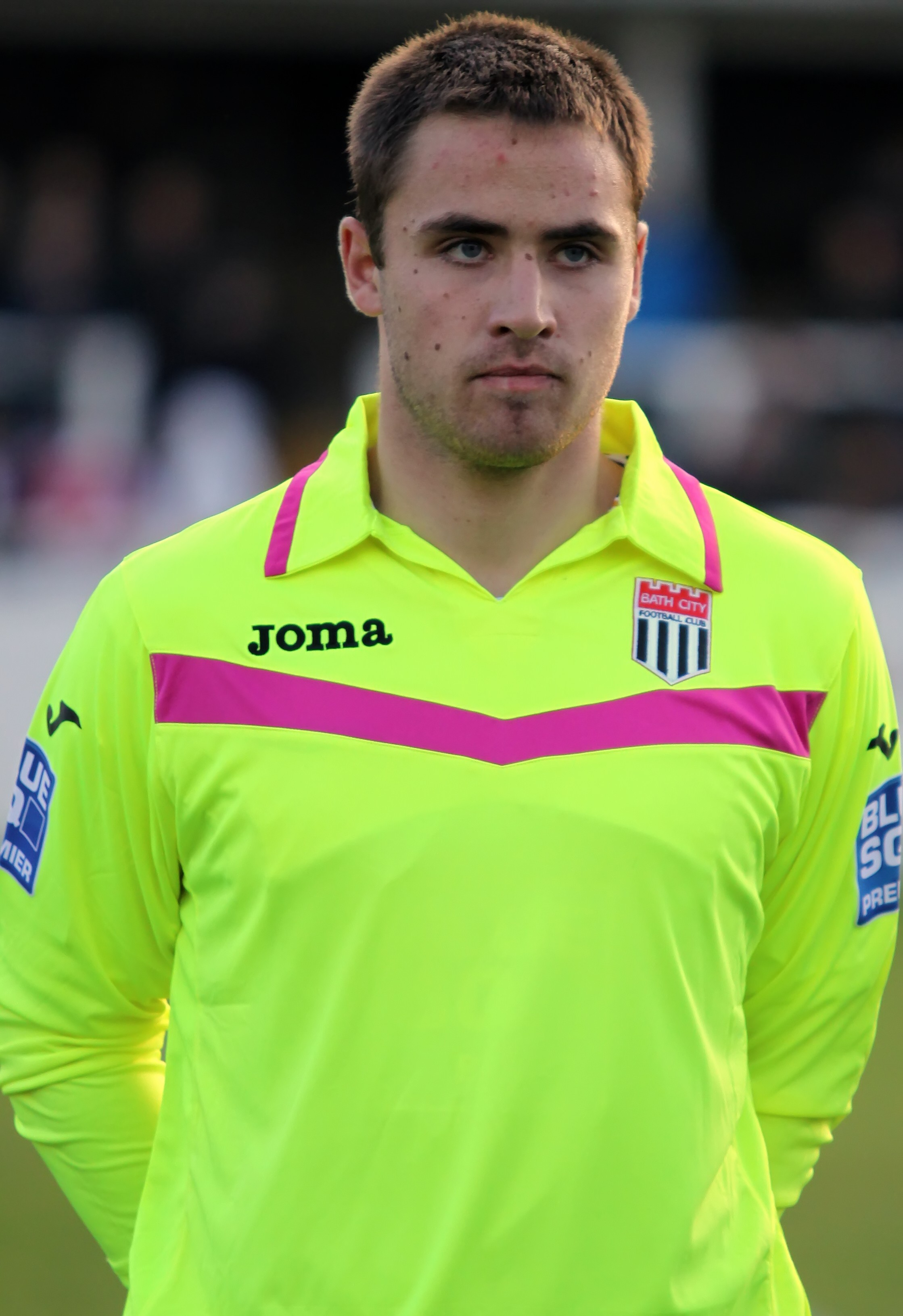
- Pentney with Bath City in 2010

Personal information
- Full name: Carl Benjamin Pentney
- Date of birth: 3 February 1989 (age 37)
- Place of birth: Colchester, England
- Height: 6 ft 0 in (1.83 m)
- Position: Goalkeeper

Team information
- Current team: Brightlingsea Regent (player); Ipswich Town (Head of Academy Goalkeeping)

Youth career
- 2005–2007: Leicester City

Senior career*
Years	Team	Apps	(Gls)
2007–2010	Leicester City	1	(0)
2007	→ York City (loan)	0	(0)
2008	→ Ilkeston Town (loan)	1	(0)
2008	→ Fisher Athletic (loan)	0	(0)
2008	→ Woking (loan)	0	(0)
2010	→ Leamington (loan)	6	(0)
2010–2013	Colchester United	0	(0)
2010–2011	→ Bath City (loan)	13	(0)
2011	→ Chelmsford City (loan)	11	(0)
2011	→ Chelmsford City (loan)	5	(0)
2011–2012	→ Hayes & Yeading United (loan)	9	(0)
2012	→ Histon (loan)	1	(0)
2013	→ Bishop's Stortford (loan)	0	(0)
2013	Bishop's Stortford	21	(0)
2013–2014	Chelmsford City	34	(0)
2014–2015	Braintree Town	2	(0)
2015–2019	Maidenhead United	175	(0)
2019	Chelmsford City	17	(0)
2020–2021	Brightlingsea Town	3	(0)
2021–	Brightlingsea Regent	0	(0)
Total		296	(0)

International career
- England U17
- * Club domestic league appearances and goals

Carl Benjamin Pentney (born 3 February 1989) is an English former professional footballer who played as a goalkeeper. He is the head of academy goalkeeping at Ipswich Town.

== Club career ==
=== Leicester City ===
Born in Colchester, Essex, Pentney started his career with the Leicester City youth system, where he was a regular for the under-18 side as well as the England under-17 team. He was part of the under-18 squad that won the FA Premier Academy League by beating Sunderland under-18s 4–3 in a penalty shootout in the 2006–07 season.

Pentney signed his first professional contract on 5 May 2007, signing a one-year deal alongside Andy King, Max Gradel and Eric Odhiambo. He joined Conference Premier team York City on a one-month loan on 9 August following a trial, but he failed to make any appearances before returning to Leicester on 8 September. He moved to Ilkeston Town on a one-month loan on 29 January 2008, but was recalled on 8 February. He later had a loan at Fisher Athletic, where he made two appearances. He signed a new one-year contract with Leicester in June 2008.

Pentney joined Woking on a one-month loan on 23 October and he finished this spell with two appearances. He made his first team debut for Leicester after coming on as a 59th minute substitute for David Martin against Swindon Town in a League One match, where he made saves against Simon Cox and Hal Robson-Kanu as Leicester drew 1–1.

On 30 June 2009, Pentney signed a six-month contract extension with Leicester. On 1 December Pentney again signed a six-month contract extension with Leicester, keeping him at the club until the end of the 2009–10 season. On 13 February 2010, Pentney joined Leamington on a one-month loan deal which was later extended to the end of the season. He finished the 2009–10 season having made no appearances for Leicester and the club announced on 17 May that he would be released when his contract expired on 30 June.

=== Colchester United ===
Pentney joined League One side Colchester United on a non-contract basis on 5 August to cover for injured goalkeeper Ben Williams, before eventually signing a one-year contract on 9 September.

On 4 November Pentney joined Bath City of the Conference Premier on a one-month loan as cover for the injured Ryan Robinson. He made his debut two days later in a 2–2 with Altrincham. The loan was extended for a second month in December. Pentney signed for Conference South club Chelmsford City on loan until the end of the 2010–11 season on 10 March 2011. On 12 September, Pentney returned to Chelmsford on a one-month loan deal. He signed for Conference Premier side Hayes & Yeading United on a one-month loan on 16 November. Pentney signed a one-year contract extension with Colchester on 12 June 2012. He joined Histon on a month-long loan deal on 9 November 2012.

=== Bishop's Stortford ===
Pentney joined Bishop's Stortford on loan in January 2013. His contract with Colchester United was cancelled by mutual consent in the last week of the same month, and subsequently he joined Bishop's Stortford until the end of the season.

=== Chelmsford City ===
Pentney signed for Chelmsford City on 12 June 2013.

=== Maidenhead United ===
After a brief spell with Braintree Town, in which he made two appearances, Pentney joined Maidenhead United in 2015, and was ever-present over the next three seasons, including promotion to the National League in 2017. After 148 consecutive league games in which he played the full 90 minutes, his streak ended when he was sent off at Havant & Waterlooville in October 2018 and was suspended for the following game. Pentney left the Magpies at the end of the 2018–19 season.

=== Chelmsford City return ===
On 21 May 2019, Pentney rejoined Chelmsford City for a fourth spell. On 9 November 2019, following a 2–2 draw at home to Dorking Wanderers, Chelmsford announced Pentney's retirement after taking up a full-time role at Ipswich Town.

== Coaching career ==
In November 2019, Pentney announced his retirement from playing football in order to take up a full-time position as head of academy goalkeeping at Ipswich Town.

Pentney played for Brightlingsea Town in the Essex and Suffolk Border Football League in 2020–21. In the 2021–22 season, he was registered as a player at Brightlingsea Regent.

== Career statistics ==
As of match played 2 October 2021

Appearances and goals by club, season and competition
Club	Season	League			FA Cup		League Cup		Other		Total	
Club	Season	Division	Apps	Goals	Apps	Goals	Apps	Goals	Apps	Goals	Apps	Goals
Leicester City	2007–08	Championship	0	0	0	0	0	0	–		0	0
Leicester City	2008–09	League One	1	0	0	0	0	0	0	0	1	0
Leicester City	2009–10	Championship	0	0	0	0	0	0	–		0	0
Leicester City	Total		1	0	0	0	0	0	0	0	1	0
York City (loan)	2007–08	Conference Premier	0	0	0	0	–		0	0	0	0
Fisher Athletic (loan)	2007–08	Conference South	0	0	0	0	–		2 (Note: Appearance(s) in the FA Trophy)	0	2	0
Woking (loan)	2008–09	Conference Premier	0	0	2	0	–		0	0	2	0
Colchester United	2010–11	League One	0	0	0	0	0	0	0	0	0	0
Colchester United	2011–12	League One	0	0	0	0	0	0	0	0	0	0
Colchester United	Total		0	0	0	0	0	0	0	0	0	0
Bath City (loan)	2010–11	Conference Premier	13	0	0	0	–		0	0	13	0
Chelmsford City (loan)	2010–11	Conference South	13	0	0	0	—		0	0	13	0
Chelmsford City (loan)	2011–12	Conference South	5	0	0	0	—		0	0	5	0
Chelmsford City (loan)	Total		18	0	0	0	0	0	0	0	18	0
Hayes & Yeading United (loan)	2011–12	Conference Premier	9	0	0	0	–		0	0	9	0
Histon (loan)	2012–13	Conference North	1	0	0	0	–		1	0	2	0
Bishops Stortford	2012–13	Conference South	21	0	0	0	—		0	0	21	0
Chelmsford City	2013–14	Conference South	35	0	0	0	—		0	0	35	0
Braintree Town	2014–15	Conference Premier	2	0	0	0	—		0	0	2	0
Maidenhead United	2015–16	National League South	42	0	3	0	—		0	0	45	0
Maidenhead United	2016–17	National League South	42	0	0	0	—		2	0	44	0
Maidenhead United	2017–18	National League	46	0	2	0	—		4	0	52	0
Maidenhead United	2018–19	National League	45	0	3	0	—		1	0	49	0
Maidenhead United	Total		175	0	8	0	0	0	7	0	190	0
Chelmsford City	2019–20	National League South	17	0	1	0	—		0	0	18	0
Brightlingsea Town	2020–21	ESBL Division Two	3	0	0	0	—		0	0	3	0
Brightlingsea Regent	2021–22	Isthmian League Premier Division	0	0	0	0	—		0	0	0	0
Career totals			2952	0	11	0	0	0	10	0	316	0
