= Jordan Sanderson =

English footballer

Personal information
- Full name: Jordan Ben Joseph Sanderson
- Date of birth: 7 August 1993 (age 33)
- Place of birth: Chingford, England
- Height: 1.85 m (6 ft 1 in)
- Position: Midfielder

Team information
- Current team: St Albans City

Youth career
- 2009–2011: Colchester United

Senior career*
Years	Team	Apps	(Gls)
2011–2014	Colchester United	2	(0)
2011	→ Chelmsford City (loan)	10	(0)
2014–2015	Ebbsfleet United	1	(0)
2014	→ Lewes (loan)	2	(0)
2014	→ Grays Athletic (loan)	0	(0)
2015–2016	Chania	23	(0)
2017	Braintree Town	?	(?)
2017–2017	Concord Rangers	0	(0)
2018–	St Albans City	8	(0)
- * Club domestic league appearances and goals as of 18:35, 19 February 2019 (UTC)

Jordan Ben Joseph Sanderson (born 7 August 1993) is an English footballer who plays as a midfielder for Concord Rangers.

Sanderson came through the Academy at Colchester United, where he made two Football League appearances. He featured for Chelmsford City on loan before joining Ebbsfleet United. He made just one league appearance for the club while spending time on loan at Lewes and Grays Athletic. He signed for Greek side Chania in September 2015.

== Career ==
=== Colchester United ===
Sanderson is a product of the Colchester United Academy. He made 10 loan appearances for Chelmsford City in early 2011 before signing his first professional deal with the U's on 6 May 2011. He made his debut for the first-team as a late substitute for John-Joe O'Toole the following day in a 2–1 home victory over Bristol Rovers.

Sanderson had to wait for almost three years for his second Colchester United appearances. He came on as an 84th-minute substitute for David Wright in a 2–1 away defeat to Leyton Orient on 1 March 2014.

=== Ebbsfleet United ===
Following his release from Colchester, Sanderson joined Conference South side Ebbsfleet United during the summer of 2014, linking up with the club for their pre-season activities. His signing was completed on 5 August 2014. He was sent out on loan to Lewes on 11 August, making two appearances. He then made his first and only league appearance for Ebbsfleet as an 84th-minute substitute for Charlie Sheringham on 4 October during a 3–0 away win over Farnborough. He had already appeared in Ebbsfleet's 2–0 Kent Senior Cup defeat by Charlton Athletic and as a substitute in their 7–1 FA Cup win over Hythe Town.

Sanderson returned to Essex in November 2014 when he joined Grays Athletic in a month-long loan deal. He played three games for Grays during his stay, including an appearance in a 3–1 Isthmian League Cup win over Tilbury, a 2–0 FA Trophy second qualifying round defeat to Tonbridge Angels, and a 1–1 away draw at Concord Rangers in the fourth round of the Essex Senior Cup.

On 5 June 2015, Sanderson was released by the club.

=== Chania ===
Sanderson began playing for Greek Football League side Chania in September 2015. He made his debut on 29 September in a 1–0 win at Pankritio Stadium over Ergotelis, before scoring his first professional goal in the Greek Cup win against Olympiacos Volos on 29 October.

== Career statistics ==
As of match played 14 April 2016.

Appearances and goals by club, season and competition
Club	Season	League			Cup		League Cup		Other		Total	
Club	Season	Division	Apps	Goals	Apps	Goals	Apps	Goals	Apps	Goals	Apps	Goals
Colchester United	2010–11	League One	1	0	0	0	0	0	0	0	1	0
Colchester United	2011–12	League One	0	0	0	0	0	0	0	0	0	0
Colchester United	2012–13	League One	0	0	0	0	0	0	0	0	0	0
Colchester United	2013–14	League One	1	0	0	0	0	0	0	0	1	0
Colchester United	Total		2	0	0	0	0	0	0	0	2	0
Chelmsford City (loan)	2010–11	Conference South	10	0	0	0	–		0	0	10	0
Ebbsfleet United	2014–15	Conference South	1	0	1	0	–		1 (Note: Appearance in Kent Senior Cup)	0	3	0
Lewes (loan)	2014–15	Isthmian League Premier Division	2	0	0	0	–		0	0	2	0
Grays Athletic (loan)	2014–15	Isthmian League Premier Division	0	0	–		–		3 (Note: Appearance in Isthmian League Cup) (Note: Appearance in FA Trophy) (Note: Appearance in Essex Senior Cup)	0	3	0
Chania	2015–16	Football League	23	0	4	1	–		–		27	1
Career total			38	0	5	1	0	0	4	0	47	1
