= Tom Bender (footballer) =

Footballer (born 1993)

Personal information
- Full name: Thomas Joseph Bender
- Date of birth: 19 January 1993 (age 33)
- Place of birth: Harlow, England
- Height: 1.91 m (6 ft 3 in)
- Position: Defender

Team information
- Current team: Billericay Town

Youth career
- 2009–2011: Colchester United

Senior career*
Years	Team	Apps	(Gls)
2009–2013	Colchester United	16	(0)
2011–2012	→ Accrington Stanley (loan)	8	(0)
2012–2013	→ Chelmsford City (loan)	2	(0)
2013–2014	Millwall	6	(0)
2014	→ Welling United (loan)	11	(0)
2014–2015	Dartford	16	(0)
2015	Forest Green Rovers	15	(0)
2015	→ St Albans City (loan)	5	(1)
2015–2022	St Albans City	245	(14)
2022–2023	Hanworth Villa	34	(12)
2023–	Billericay Town	40	(3)

International career^{‡}
2008	Wales U15		
2008	Wales U16		
2009–2010	Wales U17	5	(1)
2010–2012	Wales U19	6	(1)
2010–2011	Wales U21	7	(0)
- * Club domestic league appearances and goals as of 16:50, 7 April 2025 (UTC) ‡ National team caps and goals as of 19:41, 10 January 2013 (UTC)

Thomas Joseph Bender (born 19 January 1993) is a professional footballer who plays for Isthmian League Premier side Billericay Town. He represented Wales at under-15, under-16, under-17, under-19 and under-21 levels.

== Club career ==
=== Colchester United ===
Bender is a product of the Colchester United Academy. He made his senior debut on 19 September 2009 for Colchester in a 2–0 win against Hartlepool United, becoming the second youngest player ever to represent the club at 16 years and 243 days, just 26 days older than the record holder Lindsay Smith. Bender was named on the bench for six further games that season against Tranmere Rovers, Brentford, Wycombe Wanderers, Exeter City, Charlton Athletic and Huddersfield Town. On 19 January 2010, Bender signed his first professional contract until the summer of 2012.

On 12 June 2012, Bender signed a 12-month extension with Colchester following a season plagued by injury, including his high-profile head injury while on loan at Accrington Stanley and a hamstring tear in February 2012.

On 30 August 2011 Bender joined Football League Two club Accrington Stanley on a season-long loan deal. He was given shirt number 20 and made his debut as a substitute against Barnet, and had his first career start came against Carlisle United in the Football League Trophy.

On 4 October 2011, Bender was involved in a three-way collision in a match in the 39th minute between Ian Dunbavin of Accrington Stanley and Lucas Akins of Tranmere Rovers in a Football League Trophy match between the two teams. The match was subsequently abandoned because of the seriousness of the injury. Having received a full blow from his own goalkeeper's fist, he was rushed to hospital for a brain scan. Despite unfounded rumours that he had broken his neck, Bender regained consciousness in hospital and only suffered severe concussion. On 24 February 2012, Bender returned to Colchester early due to a hamstring tear injury.

On 30 November 2012, Bender and teammate Bradley Hamilton joined Chelmsford City on loan until 7 January 2013.

Bender was released from his Colchester contract by mutual consent on 31 January 2013.

=== Millwall ===
On 27 March 2013, Bender was signed by Millwall on a one-year contract, having been on trial with the club and appearing in their development squad.

=== Dartford ===
On 26 September 2014, Bender was signed by Dartford on a free transfer on a short-term contract until January. In January 2015, he was released by Dartford following the expiration of his contract, having made sixteen appearances for the club.

=== Forest Green Rovers ===
After a spell spent training with the club, it was confirmed on 27 February 2015 that Bender had joined Forest Green Rovers on a deal until the end of the 2014–15 season. He made his debut the following day as a substitute in a 5–3 home win over Southport. His first start came in a 4–2 away victory over Gateshead on 18 April 2015.

After helping Forest Green to the Conference National play-offs, he was offered a six-month contract for the 2015–16 season on 4 May 2015. On 27 November 2015, he joined National League South club St Albans City on a one-month loan. He was released by Forest Green at the end of his contract on 31 December 2015.

=== St Albans City ===
Bender joined St Albans City on a permanent deal in 2015 and went on to make 250 appearances in all competitions for the National League South side, as well as serving as vice-captain at Clarence Park. He left St Albans in 2022.

=== Hanworth Villa ===
In 2022, Bender joined newly promoted Middlesex-based Isthmian League South Central side Hanworth Villa. He captained them to fourth place and the play-off final loss against Walton & Hersham FC. This turned out to be his last game for the club as on 14 May 2023 it was announced that he would be joining Billericay.

=== Billericay Town ===
In May 2023, he joined Billericay Town.

== International career ==
Born in England, Bender instead chose to represent Wales and has represented them at every level up to under-21 level.

=== Under 17 ===
He made his debut for the Wales under-17 side in September 2009, playing in the opening two matches in the qualifying round of the 2010 UEFA European Under-17 Football Championship, a 3–2 win over Iceland and a 2–2 draw with Bosnia and Herzegovina.

Bender was called up for the 2010 UEFA European Under-17 Football Championship Elite Round on 10 March 2010 but withdrew from the squad due to first team commitments with Colchester.

Bender was called up by the Wales under-17 side for a friendly tournament in Sweden from 20 – 24 July. Bender captained Wales for the first game of the tournament against Iceland, Wales lost the game 2–1. Bender was also captain for the second game of the tournament against Norway in which he scored his first international goal, Wales drew 1–1. Bender also played in the third and final game of the tournament a 1 – 1 draw with Sweden.

=== Under 19 ===
Bender was called up for the Wales under-19 side on 18 April for a friendly against Northern Ireland. But he didn't feature in the game.

On 10 October 2010 Bender was called up for three 2011 UEFA European Under-19 Football Championship qualification games against Turkey, Iceland and Kazakhstan. Bender played in the 3 – 3 draw against Turkey. He also came on as a sub against Iceland and Kazakhstan.

Bender was named in a squad for a warm-weather training camp from 3 to 8 April 2011.

Bender was called up for the 2011 UEFA European Under-19 Football Championship elite qualification matches in Norway. Bender withdrew from the squad to finish the season with Colchester.

In September 2011 Bender was involved in three games in the Qualifying round of the 2012 UEFA European Under-19 Championship. He captained the team against Belgium but was subbed off, He played the full 90 minutes as captain against Scotland and in the third game he came off the bench to score against Slovenia.

=== Under 21 ===
Bender was called up as a standby player for the Wales under-21 side for a friendly against Malta on 10 August 2010. He was named on the bench for the game, coming on to make his debut as a substitute in place of David Stephens.

Bender was also named in the squad for 2011 UEFA European Under-21 Football Championship qualification Group 3 matches against Italy and Hungary. But he did not feature in those games.

Bender was put on the standby list for a friendly against Austria on 17 November. Bender was called up on 15 November to be part of the squad for the friendly against Austria. Bender came on as a 79th minute sub against Austria as Wales won the game 1 – 0.

Bender was once again called up for the Under 21s this time for a friendly against Northern Ireland on 9 February 2011. He came on as a substitute in the 56th minute.

==== 2013 UEFA European Under-21 Football Championship ====
Bender was called up for a 2013 UEFA U21 Championship qualifying match against Andorra on 29 March 2011, He was named on the bench for this game. but was unused.

Bender was called up for a friendly on 10 August against Hungary. He came on as a sub for this game.

Bender was named as standby player for a qualifier against Montenegro.

Tom was once again called up for the Under 21s, this time for a qualifier against Andorra. Bender withdrew from the squad due to injury.

Bender was named on the standby list for Geraint Williams' first two matches in charge, the first a friendly against Armenia and the second a 2013 UEFA U21 Championship qualifying match against Czech Republic.

== Career statistics ==
As of match played 1 January 2015.

Appearances and goals by club, season and competition
Club	Season	League			FA Cup		League Cup		Other		Total	
Club	Season	Division	Apps	Goals	Apps	Goals	Apps	Goals	Apps	Goals	Apps	Goals
Colchester United	2009–10	League One	1	0	0	0	0	0	0	0	1	0
Colchester United	2010–11	League One	0	0	0	0	0	0	1 (Note: Appearance in Football League Trophy)	0	1	0
Colchester United	Total		1	0	0	0	0	0	1	0	2	0
Accrington Stanley (loan)	2011–12	League Two	2	0	1	0	0	0	1	0	4	0
Chelmsford City (loan)	2012–13	Conference South	2	0	0	0	—		0	0	2	0
Welling United (loan)	2013–14	Conference Premier	11	0	0	0	—		0	0	11	0
Dartford	2014–15	Conference Premier	16	0	3	0	—		1 (Note: Appearance in FA Trophy)	0	20	0
Career total			32	0	4	0	0	0	3	0	39	0
