= Andy Bond (footballer) =

English footballer (born 1986)

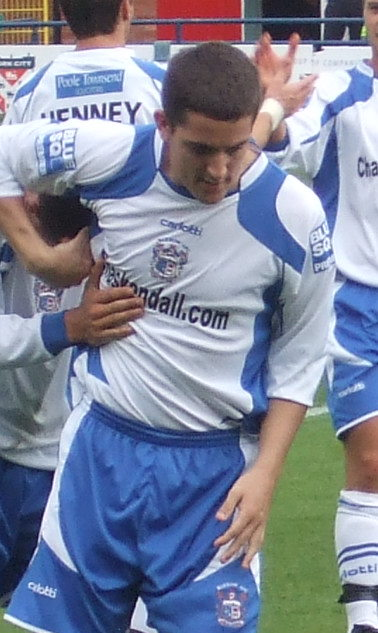
- Bond playing for Barrow in 2008

Personal information
- Full name: Andrew Mark Bond
- Date of birth: 16 March 1986 (age 40)
- Place of birth: Wigan, England
- Height: 6 ft 1 in (1.85 m)
- Position: Central midfielder

Youth career
- –2005: Crewe Alexandra

Senior career*
Years	Team	Apps	(Gls)
2005–2006	Crewe Alexandra	0	(0)
2005–2006	→ Lancaster City (loan)		
2006–2010	Barrow	161	(18)
2010–2014	Colchester United	118	(11)
2012	→ Crewe Alexandra (loan)	4	(0)
2013	→ Bristol Rovers (loan)	5	(0)
2014	Chester	19	(0)
2014–2015	Stevenage	20	(0)
2015–2016	Chorley	26	(3)
2016	Crawley Town	12	(0)
2016–2019	AFC Fylde	119	(16)
2019–2020	York City	25	(2)
2020	Matlock Town	3	(0)
2020–2021	AFC Telford United	7	(0)
- * Club domestic league appearances and goals as of 16 January 2021 (UTC)

Andrew Mark Bond (born 16 March 1986) is an English professional footballer who last played as a central midfielder for AFC Telford United. He has played in the Football League for Colchester United, Crewe Alexandra, Bristol Rovers, Stevenage and Crawley Town.

== Career ==
=== Crewe Alexandra and Barrow ===
Bond was born in Wigan, Greater Manchester. He began his career at Crewe Alexandra, but never made a first-team appearance despite being a regular for the reserve team. He joined Conference North club Lancaster City in August 2005 on loan.

Bond signed for Conference North club Barrow in 2006 after being released by Crewe. He impressed at Barrow and had a successful spell, helping the club achieve promotion to the Conference Premier through the play-offs in the 2007–08 season. In the 2009–10 season, Bond was a key player in Barrow's progression to the third round of the FA Cup, where they lost 3–0 to Sunderland and in their victorious FA Trophy campaign. During this season, Bond reportedly attracted the attention of several Championship clubs, including Leicester City, Peterborough and Preston North End. He left Barrow at the end of the 2009–10 season after turning down the offer of a new contract.

=== Colchester United ===
Bond signed for League One club Colchester United on 30 June 2010 on a two-year contract. Manager John Ward described him as "a marauding midfield player with a lot of energy and running work in him." He made his Football League debut on 7 August when starting in a 2–2 draw away to Exeter City. On 26 July 2011, Bond was involved in a nasty clash of heads with goalkeeper Mark Cousins during a friendly against local rivals Ipswich Town. With medical treatment required at the stadium, the match was abandoned by the match officials, with Bond then taken straight to hospital. He was released from hospital the following day. He went on to make 43 appearances in the 2011–12 season, scoring 4 goals. Bond joined his former club Crewe Alexandra, now in League One, on 28 September 2012 on a one-month loan.

Bond scored an 89th-minute winner in the opening match of the 2013–14 season on 3 August 2013 after coming on as a substitute two minutes earlier, with a shot from eight yards from Drey Wright's pass, to secure a 1–0 away victory over Gillingham. He joined League Two club Bristol Rovers on 12 September on a one-month loan, linking up with former manager John Ward. Bond made his debut two days later, starting in a 2–0 away defeat to Dagenham & Redbridge. He had his contract with Colchester terminated by mutual consent on 8 January 2014, with his playing time restricted in the 2013–14 season .

=== Chester ===
Following his release from Colchester, Bond signed for Conference Premier club Chester on 24 January 2014 on a contract to the end of the season, having reportedly turned down offers from Football League clubs. He made his debut the following day as a 55th-minute substitute in Chester's 3–0 away defeat to Forest Green Rovers.

=== Crawley Town ===
The midfielder joined the club on 19 February 2016 on a contract until the end of the season, and made his debut the following day in a 1–1 draw against Plymouth Argyle. He was released by the club in May that year.

=== AFC Fylde ===
The midfielder joined the National League North club in the summer of 2016, He helped the team win the league title and promotion in his first season, and then the play-offs in the National League the following year. He was released in May 2019.

=== York City and later career ===
Bond signed for National League North club York City on 25 June 2019. After a season with the Minstermen, Bond briefly signed for Northern Premier League side Buxton, before switching to divisional rivals Matlock Town before the start of the 2020/21 season. In November 2020, Bond moved again, joining National League North AFC Telford United.

== Career statistics ==
As of match played 16 January 2021

Appearances and goals by club, season and competition
Club	Season	League			FA Cup		League Cup		Other		Total	
Club	Season	Division	Apps	Goals	Apps	Goals	Apps	Goals	Apps	Goals	Apps	Goals
Crewe Alexandra	2005–06	Championship	0	0	0	0	0	0	0	0	0	0
Barrow	2006–07	Conference North	41	6	4	1	—		2 (Note: Appearance(s) in FA Trophy)	0	47	7
Barrow	2007–08	Conference North	41	6	6	1	—		8 (Note: Four appearances in Conference League Cup, one in FA Trophy, three in Conference North play-offs)	0	55	7
Barrow	2008–09	Conference Premier	39	2	3	0	—		5 (Note: Four appearances and one goal in Conference League Cup, one appearance in FA Trophy)	1	47	3
Barrow	2009–10	Conference Premier	40	4	5	3	—		9	2	54	9
Barrow	Total		161	18	18	5	—		24	3	203	26
Colchester United	2010–11	League One	43	7	2	1	1	0	0	0	46	8
Colchester United	2011–12	League One	40	3	2	1	0	0	1 (Note: Appearance in Football League Trophy)	0	43	4
Colchester United	2012–13	League One	27	0	0	0	1	0	—		28	0
Colchester United	2013–14	League One	8	1	1	0	1	0	1	0	11	1
Colchester United	Total		118	11	5	2	3	0	2	0	128	13
Crewe Alexandra (loan)	2012–13	League One	4	0	—		—		1	0	5	0
Bristol Rovers (loan)	2013–14	League Two	5	0	—		—		—		5	0
Chester	2013–14	Conference Premier	19	0	—		—		—		19	0
Stevenage	2014–15	League Two	20	0	0	0	1	0	2 (Note: Appearances in League Two play-offs)	0	23	0
Chorley	2015–16	National League North	26	3	4	2	—		2	0	32	5
Crawley Town	2015–16	League Two	12	0	—		—		—		12	0
A.F.C. Fylde	2016–17	National League North	41	5	1	0	—		2	0	44	5
A.F.C. Fylde	2017–18	National League	44	5	4	0	—		1 (Note: Appearance(s) in National League play-offs)	0	49	5
A.F.C. Fylde	2018–19	National League	34	6	0	0	—		9 (Note: Six Appearances in FA Trophy, three appearances and one goal in National League play-offs)	1	43	7
A.F.C. Fylde	Total		119	16	5	0	—		12	1	136	17
York City	2019–20	National League North	25	2	3	0	—		1	0	29	2
Matlock Town	2020–21	Northern Premier	3	0	0	0	—		0	0	3	0
AFC Telford United	2020–21	National League North	7	0	0	0	—		2	0	9	0
Career total			519	50	35	9	4	0	46	4	604	63

== Honours ==
Barrow

- Conference North play-offs: 2008
- FA Trophy: 2009–10

AFC Fylde

- National League North: 2016–17
- FA Trophy: 2018–19
