= Conor Powell =

Irish footballer (born 1987)

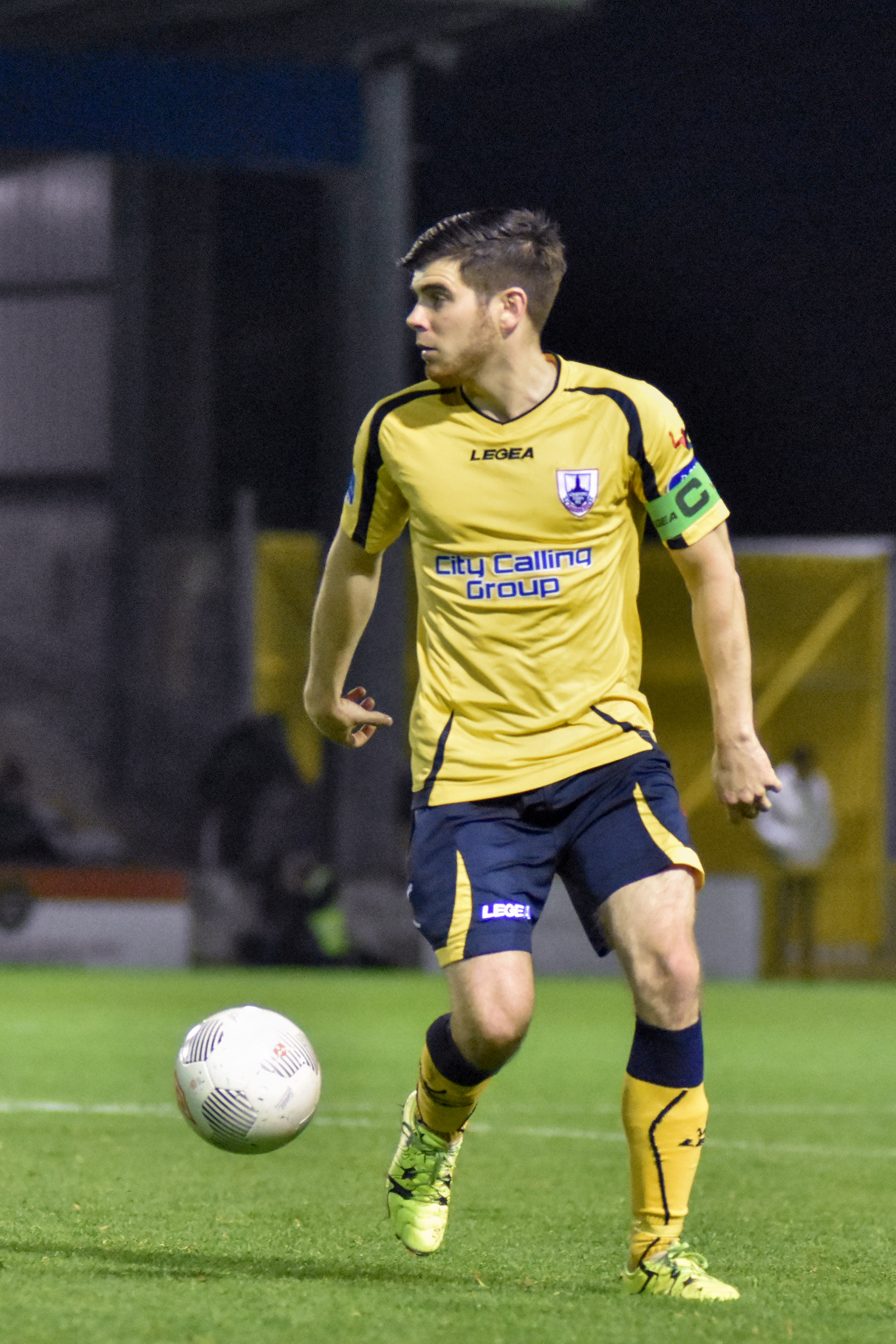
- Powell in 2016

Personal information
- Date of birth: 26 August 1987 (age 39)
- Place of birth: Dublin, Ireland
- Position: Left back

Youth career
- Belvedere

Senior career*
Years	Team	Apps	(Gls)
2005–2010	Bohemians	119	(1)
2011	Colchester United	2	(0)
2011	Sligo Rovers	13	(0)
2012–2013	Shamrock Rovers	53	(0)
2014	Vard Haugesund	28	(3)
2015–2016	Longford Town	56	(1)

International career
- Republic of Ireland U19
2006–2009	Republic of Ireland U21	9	(0)
2007	Republic of Ireland U23	3	(0)
2010	League of Ireland XI	1	(0)
- * Club domestic league appearances and goals

Conor Powell (born 26 August 1987) is an Irish former footballer who played as a left back.

== Club career ==
Powell began his youth career at his hometown club Portmarnock A.F.C. He outgrew the club, however, and made the switch to Dublin city club Belvedere where he was part of a very talented team, enjoying a lot of success before being brought to Bohemians in 2005. He progressed quickly, making his debut in the League of Ireland Cup at home to St. Patrick's Athletic in June 2005 with his league debut coming less than 2 months later against Shelbourne.

He was voted Bohemians under-21 Player of the Year in 2005 and Bohemians Young Player of the Year in 2006 and 2007. He was also the FAI Schools Player of the Year in 2006.

Conor picked up his first medal in senior football as Bohs marched to the 2008 league title. This achievement was rewarded when he was voted on to the League of Ireland Premier Division Team for 2008, receiving 56% of the votes for the left back position.

Conor scored his first ever senior goal for Bohs during the 2009 campaign on 9 October in Dalymount Park against Drogheda United. At the season's end, Powell picked up his second consecutive league winners medal as Bohemians won their first ever back-to-back titles, beating rivals Shamrock Rovers by 4 points. His fine form during the season was rewarded when he voted the PFAI Young Player of the Year for 2009.

Due to Bohemians' financial trouble Powell parted company with the club at the end of the 2010 season.

On 6 January 2011, it was reported that he was to join the English League One side Colchester United, where he would team up with former Irish teammate Dave Mooney.

However, after only making two league appearances since his January move to Colchester, he was released from the club on 10 May 2011. His only appearances coming in a Good Friday trip to Brentford on 22 April 2011 and against already Champions, Brighton, in a televised game on 25 April 2011.

On 9 July, Sligo Rovers announced the signing of Powell until the end of the season.

On 18 January 2012, it was announced that Powell had signed for Shamrock Rovers for the 2012 season. He was unveiled at the Tallaght Stadium alongside Killian Brennan, Graham Gartland, Daryl Kavanagh and player-coach Colin Hawkins. In November 2012 Powell signed on for another season.

At the beginning of 2014, Powell signed for Norwegian side Vard Haugesund where he spent one season.

On 2 February 2015, it was announced that Powell had signed for League of Ireland side Longford Town. Following Longford's relegation from the Premier Division at the end of the 2016 season, Powell left the club.

== International career ==
At international level he has represented his country at schoolboy, under-19 and under-21 levels. He made his Ireland under-21 debut away to Luxembourg in October 2006.

== Honours ==
=== Club ===
Bohemians

- League of Ireland (2): 2008, 2009
- FAI Cup (1): 2008
- Setanta Sports Cup (1): 2009–10
- League of Ireland Cup (1): 2009

Sligo Rovers

- FAI Cup (1): 2011 FAI Cup

Shamrock Rovers

- Leinster Senior Cup (2): 2012, 2013

=== Individual ===
- PFAI Young Player of the Year: 2009
- FAI Schools Player of the Year: 2006
