= Ben Williams (footballer, born 1982) =

English footballer

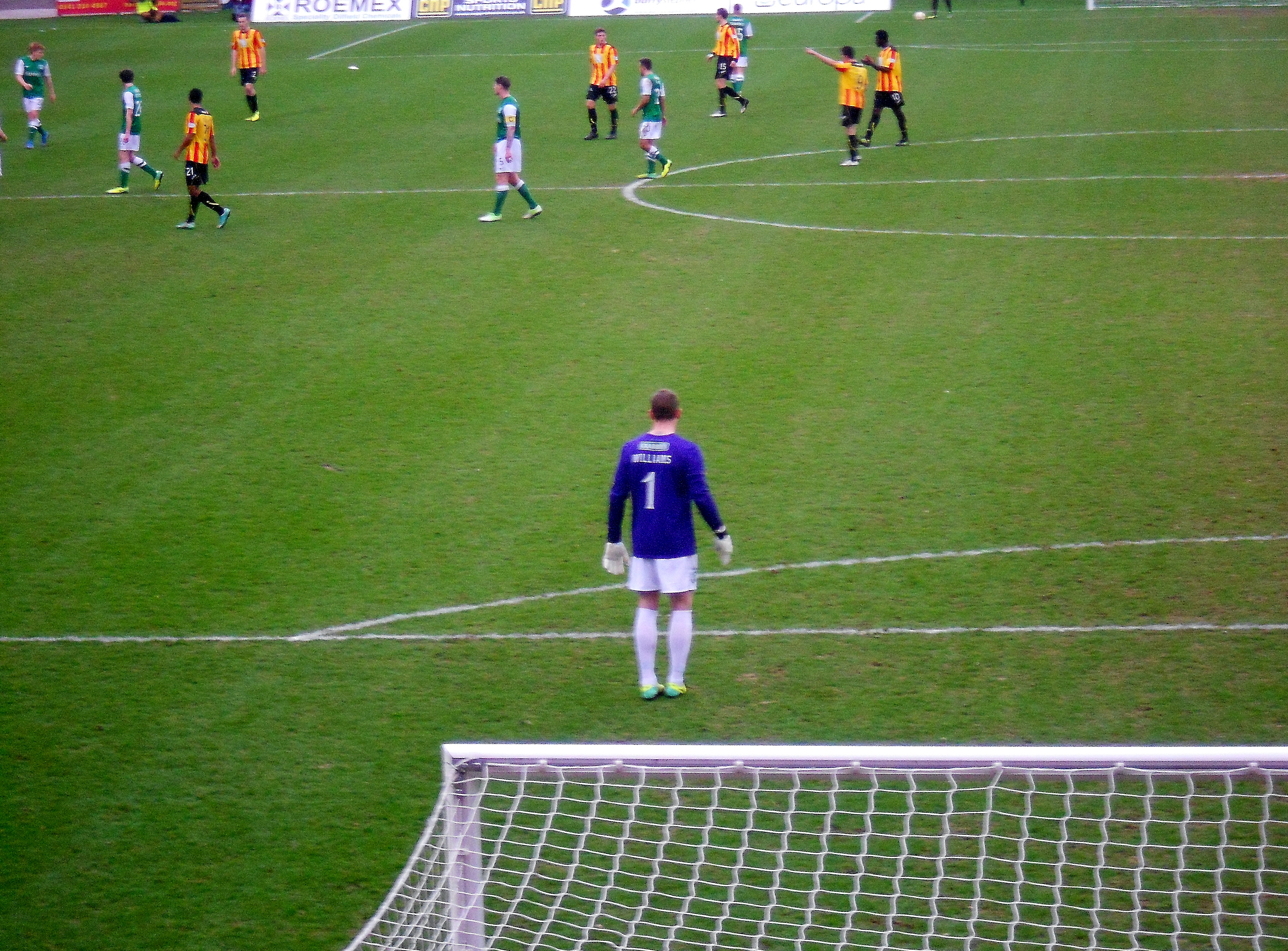
- Williams in 2013

Personal information
- Full name: Benjamin Philip Williams
- Date of birth: 27 August 1982 (age 44)
- Place of birth: Manchester, England
- Position: Goalkeeper

Youth career
- 1999–2002: Manchester United

Senior career*
Years	Team	Apps	(Gls)
2002–2004	Manchester United	0	(0)
2002	→ Coventry City (loan)	0	(0)
2003	→ Chesterfield (loan)	14	(0)
2003	→ Altrincham (loan)	6	(0)
2004	→ Crewe Alexandra (loan)	10	(0)
2004–2008	Crewe Alexandra	125	(0)
2008–2009	Carlisle United	31	(0)
2009–2012	Colchester United	115	(0)
2012–2014	Hibernian	74	(0)
2014–2016	Bradford City	57	(0)
2016–2017	Bury	21	(0)
2017–2018	Blackpool	3	(0)
2018–2019	Bolton Wanderers	0	(0)
Total		448	(0)
- * Club domestic league appearances and goals

Benjamin Philip Williams (born 27 August 1982) is an English former professional footballer who played as a goalkeeper.

He started his career at Manchester United, where he made pre-season appearances and was an unused substitute for a number of games. Williams was loaned out to several clubs, being Coventry City, Chesterfield, Altrincham and Crewe Alexandra.

Williams signed on a permanent deal with Crewe in 2004, after his release from Manchester United. He later played for Carlisle United, Colchester United, Hibernian, Bradford City, Bury, Blackpool and Bolton Wanderers.

== Playing career ==
=== Manchester United ===
During the 2002–03 season, he was placed on the bench for the first team when Fabien Barthez was injured. He was loaned out to several clubs during his career, including spells at Coventry City, where he did not play a competitive game, and Chesterfield, who were down to just one goalkeeper when Carl Muggleton was ruled out for around six weeks with a double stress fracture of the fibula. Chesterfield manager Dave Rushbury said, "We must be doing something right because Manchester United don't let players out on loan unless they are confident they will be properly looked after. We have had the situation in hand following Carl Muggleton's injury and are delighted to welcome Ben Williams now that he is available to come on loan to us". Manchester United agreed to allow Williams to stay with the Spireites for a second month, following the news that first team goalkeeper, Carl Muggleton, was not expected to be fit for a further few weeks. In September 2003, he spent a month with Altrincham making six appearances.

=== Crewe Alexandra ===
In 2004, Williams was loaned out to Crewe Alexandra. Williams made 10 appearances for Crewe, conceding 14 goals and keeping two clean sheets during his loan spell. Williams' teammate, David Wright, told the Crewe website that "[Williams] is top drawer and I hope we can sign him for next year. He is young so he can only get better. He is a natural. He can catch the ball and also stops shots which he has no right to. He is an all-round good goalkeeper". In June 2004, Williams signed permanently for Crewe, following his release from Manchester United. In his second season with Crewe, he made 23 appearances. His third season with Crewe was cut short after Williams was diagnosed with meningitis, in the wake of which Crewe closed their training ground to prevent the spread of the disease. Williams made a full recovery a couple of months later.

His fourth season for the Railwaymen did not go according to plan; already three games into the season and Williams had conceded seven goals. However the keeper was trying to get back to his consistent form in which he impressed the majority of the Crewe faithful with his outstanding saves, and was hoping to break Clayton Ince's clean sheet record.

His contract expired in June 2008, and he rejected the offer of a new one from the club, so looked set to leave on a Bosman free transfer.

=== Carlisle United ===
On 25 June, Williams agreed terms with Carlisle United, who signed him as a replacement for the recently departed Keiren Westwood. Williams began his first (2008–09) season with Carlisle United as the team's first-choice goalkeeper. However, after making a few errors during the club's first few games of the season, he was soon dropped to the bench as the on-loan Ben Alnwick came into the side. Once Alnwick's loan period was over, Williams hoped to regain his first team spot, but Dutch keeper Tim Krul came in on loan from Newcastle United shortly after. Once Krul's loan period finished, Williams got a chance in the first team again, conceding four against Tranmere Rovers. His performances improved over the second half of the season, culminating in a clean sheet against Millwall (which helped Carlisle to avoid relegation) and coming second in the fan vote for player of the season as voted for in the local newspaper.

=== Colchester United ===
Williams signed for Colchester United for £60,000 on 10 July 2009. He made his debut in the opening game of the season, a 7–1 away win over Norwich City on 8 August 2009. His first clean sheet of the 2009–10 season came against Southampton in a 0–0 draw on 5 September 2009. He then kept a further 16 clean sheets during his debut season and has not only established himself as Colchester United's first-choice goalkeeper, but has also become a favourite with the U's faithful due to his assured, commanding performances. These solid performances led to Williams winning three Player of the Season Awards at the end of the 2009–10 season for Colchester United, including both the Colchester United Supporters Association (CUSA) home and away player of the year awards as voted for by fans, and also the Official Player of the Year Award. He decided to leave Colchester when his contract expired in June 2012; manager John Ward said that Williams wanted to play in the Championship.

=== Hibernian ===
On 10 July 2012, Williams signed a two-year contract with Scottish side Hibernian. During the 2012–13 season, Williams has saved five opposition penalty kicks. Williams won the player of the year award made by the Hibs Supporters' Association for 2012–13, ahead of regular goalscorer Leigh Griffiths. Hibs suffered relegation in the 2013–14 season, after which Williams was released at the end of his contract.

=== Bradford City ===
Williams signed for Bradford City in August 2014. He made his debut on 12 August, keeping a clean sheet as Bradford beat Morecambe 1–0 in the first round of the League Cup.

=== Bury ===
Williams moved to Bury in June 2016.

=== Blackpool ===
Williams signed for Blackpool on 3 July 2017. He was released by Blackpool at the end of the 2017–18 season.

=== Bolton Wanderers ===
On 3 August 2018 it was announced that Williams would be registered as goalkeeping back-up for Bolton Wanderers, where he worked as the Academy Goalkeeping Coach. At the end of the 2018–19 season, he reverted to his old role coaching the Bolton Wanderers Academy goalkeepers.

== Coaching career ==
In February 2018, he replaced Dave Timmins as the goalkeeper coach at Blackpool with whom he was still playing for at the time.

In July 2018, he was working as a goalkeeper coach for the Bolton Wanderers Academy and even turned out for the first team in a friendly against Guiseley to cover for regular goalkeeper Ben Alnwick.

Despite being named as a substitute on numerous occasions, he did not make any appearances for the Bolton first team in the 2018–19 season and reverted to his old youth coaching role that summer, often stepping up to assist Lee Butler and later Mike Pollitt with first team duties. He left Bolton on 29 January 2021.

== Career statistics ==
Appearances and goals by club, season and competition
Club	Season	League			Cup		League Cup		Continental		Other		Total	
Club	Season	Division	Apps	Goals	Apps	Goals	Apps	Goals	Apps	Goals	Apps	Goals	Apps	Goals
Manchester United	2002–03	Premier League	0	0	0	0	0	0	0	0	0	0	0	0
Manchester United	2003–04	Premier League	0	0	0	0	0	0	0	0	0	0	0	0
Manchester United	Total		0	0	0	0	0	0	0	0	0	0	0	0
Coventry City (loan)	2002–03	First Division	0	0	0	0	0	0	–		0	0	0	0
Chesterfield (loan)	2002–03	Second Division	14	0	0	0	0	0	–		0	0	14	0
Crewe Alexandra (loan)	2003–04	First Division	10	0	0	0	0	0	–		0	0	10	0
Crewe Alexandra	2004–05	Championship	23	0	0	0	3	0	–		0	0	26	0
Crewe Alexandra	2005–06	Championship	17	0	0	0	1	0	–		0	0	18	0
Crewe Alexandra	2006–07	League One	39	0	0	0	2	0	–		4 (Note: Appearances in the Football League Trophy)	0	45	0
Crewe Alexandra	2007–08	League One	46	0	2	0	1	0	–		0	0	49	0
Crewe Alexandra	Total		125	0	2	0	7	0	–		4	0	138	0
Carlisle United	2008–09	League One	31	1	2	0	2	0	–		1	0	36	0
Colchester United	2009–10	League One	46	0	3	0	0	0	–		0	0	49	0
Colchester United	2010–11	League One	33	0	3	0	0	0	–		1	0	37	0
Colchester United	2011–12	League One	36	0	2	0	0	0	–		1	0	39	0
Colchester United	Total		115	0	8	0	0	0	–		2	0	125	0
Hibernian	2012–13	Scottish Premier League	37	0	5	0	1	0	–		–		43	0
Hibernian	2013–14	Scottish Premiership	37	0	2	0	2	0	2 (Note: Appearances in the Europa League)	0	2 (Note: Appearances in the Scottish Premiership Play-offs)	0	45	0
Hibernian	Total		74	0	7	0	3	0	2	0	2	0	88	0
Bradford City	2014–15	League One	14	0	8	0	3	0	–		–		25	0
Bradford City	2015–16	League One	43	0	5	0	1	0	–		3 (Note: One appearance in the Football League Trophy and two in the League One play-offs)	0	52	0
Bradford City	Bradford total		57	0	13	0	4	0	–		3	0	77	0
Bury	2016–17	League One	22	0	2	0	1	0	–		3 (Note: Appearances in the EFL Trophy)	0	28	0
Blackpool	2017–18	League One	0	0	0	0	1	0	–		1	0	2	0
Bolton Wanderers	2018–19	Championship	0	0	0	0	0	0	–		–		0	0
Career totals			448	0	34	0	18	0	2	0	16	0	518	0
