= George Elokobi =

Cameroonian footballer (born 1986)

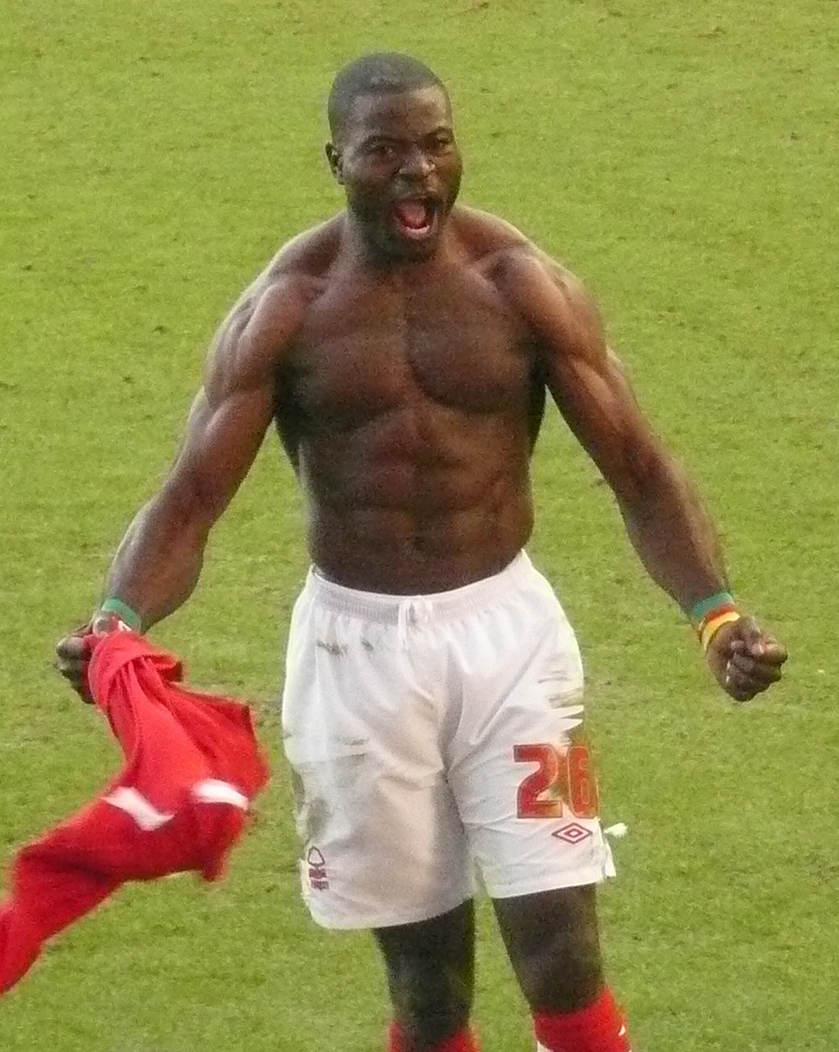
- Elokobi playing for Nottingham Forest in 2012

Personal information
- Full name: George Nganyuo Elokobi
- Date of birth: 31 January 1986 (age 40)
- Place of birth: Mamfe, Cameroon
- Height: 1.83 m (6 ft 0 in)
- Position: Centre back

Senior career*
Years	Team	Apps	(Gls)
2002–2004	Dulwich Hamlet		
2004–2008	Colchester United	39	(2)
2005	→ Chester City (loan)	5	(0)
2008–2014	Wolverhampton Wanderers	85	(2)
2012	→ Nottingham Forest (loan)	12	(0)
2012	→ Bristol City (loan)	1	(0)
2014–2015	Oldham Athletic	24	(3)
2015–2017	Colchester United	46	(3)
2016	→ Braintree Town (loan)	7	(0)
2017–2019	Leyton Orient	24	(2)
2019	Aldershot Town	13	(0)
2019–2022	Maidstone United	55	(2)
Total		311	(14)

Managerial career
- 2023–2026: Maidstone United
- * Club domestic league appearances and goals

George Nganyuo Elokobi (born 31 January 1986) is a Cameroonian-French football coach and former player who was recently manager of National League South club Maidstone United.

Elokobi, a centre back, moved from his native Cameroon to England at the age of 16, where he entered non-League football with Dulwich Hamlet. After a trial period, he was signed by Colchester United. He was loaned to Chester City in January 2005, where he made his professional debut, before going on to make 46 appearances for Colchester. He was signed by Wolverhampton Wanderers in January 2008, helping the club to promotion to the Premier League. He established himself as a regular in the first-team between 2009 and 2011, before he was loaned to Nottingham Forest for the second half of the 2011–12 season, making twelve league appearances. He was loaned out to Bristol City in September 2012, but suffered a near season-ending injury on his debut when he fractured his ankle. He fell out of favour at Wolves, and at the end of the 2013–14 season he was released, joining Oldham Athletic. He spent one season with Oldham before returning to Colchester United in 2015. He had a spell at National League side Braintree Town on loan from Colchester in 2016. He joined Leyton Orient in July 2017 and was released on his 33rd birthday. On 12 February 2019, Elokobi signed for fellow National League side Aldershot Town before moving on to Maidstone at the end of the year as a player/academy coach.

During his career he won promotion four times and scored in every division from the Premier League to National League South.

== Early years ==
Born in Mamfe, Cameroon, Elokobi was aged just eleven years old when he lost both his father (to diabetes) and his grandfather. He went to live with his grandmother the same year, while his mother moved to England to study. When she gained her qualifications, she found work and was able to send her son to one of the best boarding schools in Cameroon, St. Joseph's College Sasse. At the age of 16, Elokobi moved to London to join her, where he attended college, studying business, IT and sociology. Elokobi holds French nationality from his mother who holds both Cameroonian and French nationalities.

== Club career ==
=== Colchester United ===
Shortly after his arrival in England in 2002, Elokobi joined the youth scheme at Isthmian League Division One side Dulwich Hamlet. It was here that he was spotted by Colchester United scouts. He was offered a trial at the end of the 2003–04 season, before becoming Phil Parkinson's fourth summer signing on 29 June 2004.

==== Chester City loan ====
Elokobi did not feature for Colchester's first-team in his first season with the club, but he was loaned to League Two Chester City for one month in January 2005, working under Ian Rush. He made his professional debut for Chester on 29 January 2005, starting in their 3–0 defeat to Swansea City at Vetch Field. On his fifth and final appearance for the club on 26 February, he was sent off for fouling Luke Rodgers in the penalty area during a 5–0 defeat away to Shrewsbury Town.

==== 2005–06 season ====
Despite failing to make a first-team appearance for Colchester during the 2004–05 season, Elokobi was rewarded with a new deal to remain at the club after making the substitutes bench for a number of games towards the end of the season. He eventually made his U's debut on 24 August 2005 in their 2–0 defeat to Cardiff City in the League Cup at Layer Road. He replaced Pat Baldwin after 78 minutes of play. He made his first league start three days later as Colchester were held to a 0–0 draw by Oldham Athletic. He then scored his first professional goal on 24 September with the opener at home against Huddersfield Town in a 1–1 draw.

Elokobi was ruled out of action through much of October and November 2005 after being diagnosed with mumps. He returned to action on 23 November in Colchester's 3–2 extra time win against Northampton Town in the Football League Trophy, where he scored the U's equalising goal at 1–1 in the 57th minute of the tie. He made a total of twelve League One appearances across the season, with a further five in cup competitions, as he helped his side to second place in the table and promotion to the Championship.

==== 2006–07 season ====
After starting both opening fixtures of Colchester's maiden season in the second tier of English football, a suspension earned after being sent off in a reserve game meant that Elokobi was displaced by Cardiff City loanee Chris Barker, who retained the left-back position for much of the season. He made just ten league appearances over the course of the campaign.

==== 2007–08 season ====
Holding off competition from Danny Granville and securing the left-back position for himself in the early stages of the 2007–08 season, Elokobi's performances and three registered assists had seen him linked with a move to Scottish side Celtic in September 2008, but Elokobi said that it was "nice to get the recognition... but it will not affect my football and I will keep working hard". After making 14 appearances, Elokobi handed in a transfer request in November 2007, stating that he had no intention of re-signing for the club once his contract expired in the summer of 2008. With the club yet to receive an offer for the player, he made his first start since handing in his transfer request on 1 December. He scored what would prove to be the decisive goal and his final Colchester goal in the 2–1 win against Sheffield Wednesday at Hillsborough. Following the game, Elokobi insisted that he would "give 100 per cent for the club" while still with Colchester. He played his final game for the U's in a 3–1 FA Cup home defeat by Peterborough United on 5 January 2008, having made 18 appearances in all competitions.

=== Wolverhampton Wanderers ===
Elokobi's transfer request at Colchester alerted fellow Championship club Wolverhampton Wanderers to sign him on 31 January 2008 for an undisclosed fee on a 2 1/2-year deal, later revealed to be £500,000. He made his debut in Wolves' 0–0 draw at Blackpool on 12 February, and quickly became a regular in the starting eleven, making 15 appearances from his debut until the end of the season.

==== 2008–09 season ====
Continuing how the previous season ended, Elokobi began the 2008–09 campaign as a regular starter under Mick McCarthy's stewardship, making three consecutive appearances from the opening day of the season. However, in the fourth game of the season, a trip to Portman Road to face Ipswich Town on 23 August 2008, Elokobi suffered a serious knee ligament injury that was expected to rule him out for the remainder of the season. During his injury lay-off, Elokobi was handed a new deal with the club as they surged to the Championship league title and earned promotion to the Premier League. He returned from injury faster than expected, as he was able to make a late substitute appearance in the 1–0 home win over Doncaster Rovers on the final day of the season to lift the Championship trophy.

==== 2009–10 season ====
Elokobi made his Premier League bow as a half-time substitute for former Colchester United teammate Greg Halford in Wolves' 1–0 defeat to Manchester City at the City of Manchester Stadium on 22 August 2009. He made 26 appearances over the course of the 2009–10 season, which was enough to earn him a new three-year deal in August 2010.

==== 2010–11 season ====
Elokobi scored his first Wolves goal on 26 October 2010 during a 3–2 League Cup defeat to Manchester United at Old Trafford. He scored Wolves' first goal to draw the scoreline level at 1–1 on 60 minutes. On 8 January 2011, he received only his second-ever red card when he was sent off for a reckless tackle on Doncaster Rovers' James Coppinger after 77 minutes of the 2–2 FA Cup draw. He played 32 games played during the season as Wolves narrowly avoided relegation despite defeat.

==== 2011–12 season ====
After being utilised intermittently during the beginning of Wolves' 2011–12 Premier League campaign, Elokobi struck his first goal of the season on 20 September 2011 in a 5–0 League Cup win over Millwall. After struggling to hold down a regular first team place with just three starts in eight Premier League games, Elokobi was made available for loan in February 2012.

==== Nottingham Forest loan ====
Championship side Nottingham Forest signed Elokobi in an emergency loan deal on 9 February 2012, with Wolverhampton Wanderers hoping the move would give Elokobi a chance to play some games. The loan move would last until the end of the Championship season on 28 April. He made his debut on 11 February in Forest's 1–1 home draw with Watford. He went on to make twelve appearances to help steer Forest clear from relegation to League One, while his parent club were relegated to the Championship. Impressed by his performances during his short stay, Nottingham Forest were linked with a permanent transfer for Elokobi in July 2012, but a move never materialised.

==== 2012–13 season ====
Elokobi returned to the Wolves squad for their 2012–13 season in the Championship as a substitute for David Edwards in their 1–1 draw with Derby County on 25 August 2012. However, Elokobi fell out of favour under new manager Ståle Solbakken who preferred Kevin Foley in covering the left-back role, and with Solbakken stating that his squad was three to four players too large, Elokobi was made available for loan.

==== Bristol City loan ====
Bristol City signed Elokobi on a 93-day emergency loan on 26 September 2012 as cover for Greg Cunningham who had been ruled out of action for two months with an ankle injury. He made his debut on 29 September during City's 3–2 home defeat to Leeds United, but he suffered what was thought to be another season-ending injury after he fractured and dislocated his ankle 43 minutes into his debut. His loan was immediately terminated with the player undergoing surgery.

He returned to action for Wolves earlier than expected once again, featuring in the final game of the season defeat to Brighton & Hove Albion which confirmed a second successive relegation for the club.

==== 2013–14 season ====
Ahead of the 2013–14 season, Elokobi took up a one-year contract extension option to remain with Wolves until the end of the season. Manager Kenny Jackett told Elokobi he would offer the player a "fresh start", but after enduring another frustrating season where he made just nine appearances in all competitions, the club decided not to offer him a new contract, and he made his final appearance in a testimonial match for Jody Craddock at the end of the campaign.

=== Oldham Athletic ===
Following his release from Wolverhampton Wanderers, Elokobi signed a one-year contract with League One side Oldham Athletic on 8 August 2014. He made his debut the following day as an 80th-minute substitute for James Dayton during Oldham's 2–2 draw with Elokobi's former club Colchester United at Colchester Community Stadium. He suffered a thigh injury during a 3–2 win over Scunthorpe United on 27 September that ruled him out of action for all of October and almost all of November 2014.

On his return, Elokobi was a regular feature in Lee Johnson's starting line-up, and he then scored his first goal for the club on 26 December with a header from a corner kick in a 2–1 home defeat by Crewe Alexandra. After Johnson departed the club, Elokobi fell out of favour with his replacement Dean Holden, making just one substitute appearance between his departure on 25 February until the end of the season. His season ended with three goals in 27 appearances.

With his contract expiring, the club offered Elokobi a new contract on reduced terms, but after rejecting the offer, he decided to leave the club.

=== Return to Colchester United ===
Colchester United re-signed Elokobi on a two-year contract on 3 July 2015 after a seven-year absence. After spending much of pre-season out of contention through injury, Elokobi made his second debut for Colchester during their 4–0 away defeat to Fleetwood Town on 22 August. He replaced Richard Brindley after 57 minutes when his side were 3–0 down. On his first start for the club on 29 August, Elokobi scored the equalising goal in Colchester's 2–2 draw with Scunthorpe United at the Colchester Community Stadium.

Elokobi received his first red card of his combined Colchester United career on 15 September when, while already on a yellow card, he brought down Sheffield United striker Billy Sharp in the penalty area in the 86th minute with the score at 3–2 to Colchester. The resultant penalty was saved by Colchester goalkeeper Jamie Jones, and the side went on to win the match. Elokobi scored two goals and made 19 appearances in the 2015–16 season.

==== Braintree Town loan ====
Out of favour under new Colchester manager John McGreal, Elokobi was made available for loan in August 2016. He joined National League side Braintree Town in a month-long loan deal on 4 October 2016. He made his Braintree debut the same day in their 2–1 home defeat by Boreham Wood. He scored twice in Braintree's 7–0 FA Cup first round win over Eastbourne Borough on 5 November.

==== Return to Colchester ====
Elokobi was recalled from his loan at Braintree on 22 November and went straight into Colchester's squad for their match against Cheltenham Town the same day. He made his first start of the season and helped the U's end their eleven-game winless run in League Two with a 3–0 win. He scored his first goal of the season in Colchester's 1–0 win at home to Wycombe Wanderers on 21 February 2017. He became ever-present until the end of the season, playing 29 League Two games. He left the club at the end of his contract after failing to agree a new deal.

=== Leyton Orient ===
On 14 July 2017, Elokobi signed a two-year contract with National League side Leyton Orient. On 31 January 2019 it was announced that he had left the club by mutual consent having been placed on the transfer list ten days earlier.

=== Aldershot Town ===
On 12 February 2019, Elokobi signed for National League side Aldershot Town on a deal until the end of the season.

=== Maidstone United ===
Elokobi left Aldershot at the end of the season and joined Maidstone United on a one–year contract.

Elokobi's final season with the club saw him gain a fourth career promotion as Maidstone won the 2021–22 National League South title. He scored in the final game of his career on 7 May in a 2–1 win against Hampton & Richmond Borough.

On 3 May 2022, Elokobi announced on Twitter that he would retire from playing professional football at the end of the season.

== International career ==
Elokobi was first called up for the Cameroon national team in November 2010 for a training camp in France in December 2010 in preparation for 2012 Africa Cup of Nations qualifying games. He was again called-up ahead of a qualifying game with Senegal in March 2011, replacing the injured Gaëtan Bong, but was an unused substitute in the match. He was also set to play in a friendly against Gabon in France three days later, but the game was cancelled with no official reason announced for the cancellation.

== Coaching career ==
=== Maidstone United ===
Following the departure of Hakan Hayrettin in January 2023, Elokobi was appointed caretaker manager of Maidstone United.

On 24 March 2023, Elokobi was named permanent manager at Maidstone United. In the 2023–24 season, Maidstone reached the FA Cup fourth round for the first time. On 27 January 2024, Maidstone reached the FA Cup fifth round for the first time after a shock 2–1 away win at Ipswich Town. They became "the first club outside the top five tiers of English football to reach the FA Cup fifth round since Blyth Spartans in 1978".

On 14 April 2026, Elokobi announced that he would be departing the club at the end of the 2025–26 season.

== Personal life ==
For Series Two of the Apple TV series Ted Lasso, assistant director Sophie Worger hired former professional player Kasali Casal to manage the football choreography. Casal enlisted a team of former professional players to play for the opposition teams facing AFC Richmond during game scenes, including Elokobi and fellow former Premier League players Lee Hendrie, Jermaine Pennant and Jay Bothroyd.

== Career statistics ==
As of 8 May 2022

Appearances and goals by club, season and competition
Club	Season	League			FA Cup		League Cup		Other		Total	
Club	Season	Division	Apps	Goals	Apps	Goals	Apps	Goals	Apps	Goals	Apps	Goals
Colchester United	2004–05	League One	0	0	0	0	0	0	0	0	0	0
Colchester United	2005–06	League One	12	1	0	0	1	0	4 (Note: Appearance(s) in Football League Trophy)	1	17	2
Colchester United	2006–07	Championship	10	0	0	0	0	0	–		10	0
Colchester United	2007–08	Championship	17	1	1	0	1	0	–		19	1
Colchester United	Total		39	2	1	0	2	0	4	1	46	3
Chester City (loan)	2004–05	League Two	5	0	–		–		–		5	0
Wolverhampton Wanderers	2007–08	Championship	15	0	0	0	0	0	–		15	0
Wolverhampton Wanderers	2008–09	Championship	4	0	0	0	1	0	–		5	0
Wolverhampton Wanderers	2009–10	Premier League	22	0	2	0	2	0	–		26	0
Wolverhampton Wanderers	2010–11	Premier League	27	2	2	0	3	1	–		32	3
Wolverhampton Wanderers	2011–12	Premier League	9	0	1	0	3	1	–		13	1
Wolverhampton Wanderers	2012–13	Championship	2	0	0	0	1	0	–		3	0
Wolverhampton Wanderers	2013–14	League One	6	0	1	0	0	0	2	0	9	0
Wolverhampton Wanderers	Total		85	2	6	0	10	2	2	0	103	4
Nottingham Forest (loan)	2011–12	Championship	12	0	–		–		–		12	0
Bristol City (loan)	2012–13	Championship	1	0	–		–		–		1	0
Oldham Athletic	2014–15	League One	24	3	1	0	1	0	1	0	27	3
Colchester United	2015–16	League One	17	2	1	0	0	0	1	0	19	2
Colchester United	2016–17	League Two	29	1	0	0	0	0	0	0	29	1
Colchester United	Total		46	3	1	0	0	0	1	0	48	3
Braintree Town (loan)	2016–17	National League	7	0	2	2	–		0	0	9	2
Leyton Orient	2017–18	National League	21	2	0	0	–		2 (Note: Appearance(s) in FA Trophy)	1	23	3
Leyton Orient	2018–19	National League	3	0	0	0	–		2	1	5	1
Leyton Orient	Total		24	2	0	0	–		4	2	28	4
Aldershot Town	2018–19	National League	13	0	0	0	–		0	0	13	0
Maidstone United	2019–20	National League South	29	1	5	0	—		3	0	37	1
Maidstone United	2020–21	National League South	13	0	2	0	—		2	0	17	0
Maidstone United	2021–22	National League South	13	1	0	0	—		2	0	15	1
Maidstone United	Total		55	2	7	0	—		7	0	69	2
Career total			311	14	18	2	13	2	19	3	361	21

== Managerial statistics ==
As of 11 March 2026

Managerial record by team and tenure
Team	Nat	From	To	Record					Ref
Team	Nat	From	To	G	W	D	L	Win %	Ref
Maidstone United	(England)	9 January 2023	25 April 2026	161	68	42	51	42.24	
Total				161	68	42	51	42.24	—

== Honours ==
=== As a manager ===
Maidstone United

- Kent Senior Cup: 2023–24, 2025–26

Individual

- National League South Manager of the Month: December 2024
