= 2011–12 Wolverhampton Wanderers F.C. season =

English football club season

Wolverhampton Wanderers
2011–12 season
- Chairman: Steve Morgan OBE
- Manager: Mick McCarthy (until 13 February); Terry Connor (from 24 February)
- Premier League: 20th (relegated)
- FA Cup: 3rd round
- League Cup: 4th round
- Top goalscorer: League: Steven Fletcher (12); All: Steven Fletcher (12)
- Highest home attendance: 27,494 (vs Manchester United, 18 March 2012)
- Lowest home attendance: 7,749 (vs Millwall, 20 September 2011)
- Average home league attendance: 25,682
| Home colours | Away colours |

The 2011–12 season was the 113th season of competitive league football in the history of English football club Wolverhampton Wanderers. The club competed in the Premier League, the highest level of English football, for a third consecutive season. The previous season had seen them narrowly survive on the final day, ending one point above the relegation zone after having occupied a place in it for much of the campaign.

After a poor season, the club were relegated to the Football League Championship, ending in 20th place. Their relegation was confirmed on 22 April with three games to spare. The team won just one of their final 24 games, and set a new club record of failing to keep a clean sheet in 30 consecutive league games.

Mick McCarthy began the campaign as the club's manager for a sixth campaign, but was sacked on 13 February 2012 after a 1–5 defeat to local rivals West Bromwich Albion. After searching for a new permanent successor for eleven days, the club opted to hand assistant manager Terry Connor the managerial post for the rest of the season. However, he failed to win any of his thirteen games in charge.

This season opened with the capacity of Molineux reduced due to the ongoing rebuilding of the new Stan Cullis Stand (North Bank) making it unavailable for use. The bottom tier of the new two-tiered structure was completed by mid-September to increase the stadium capacity to over 27,000.

== Season review ==
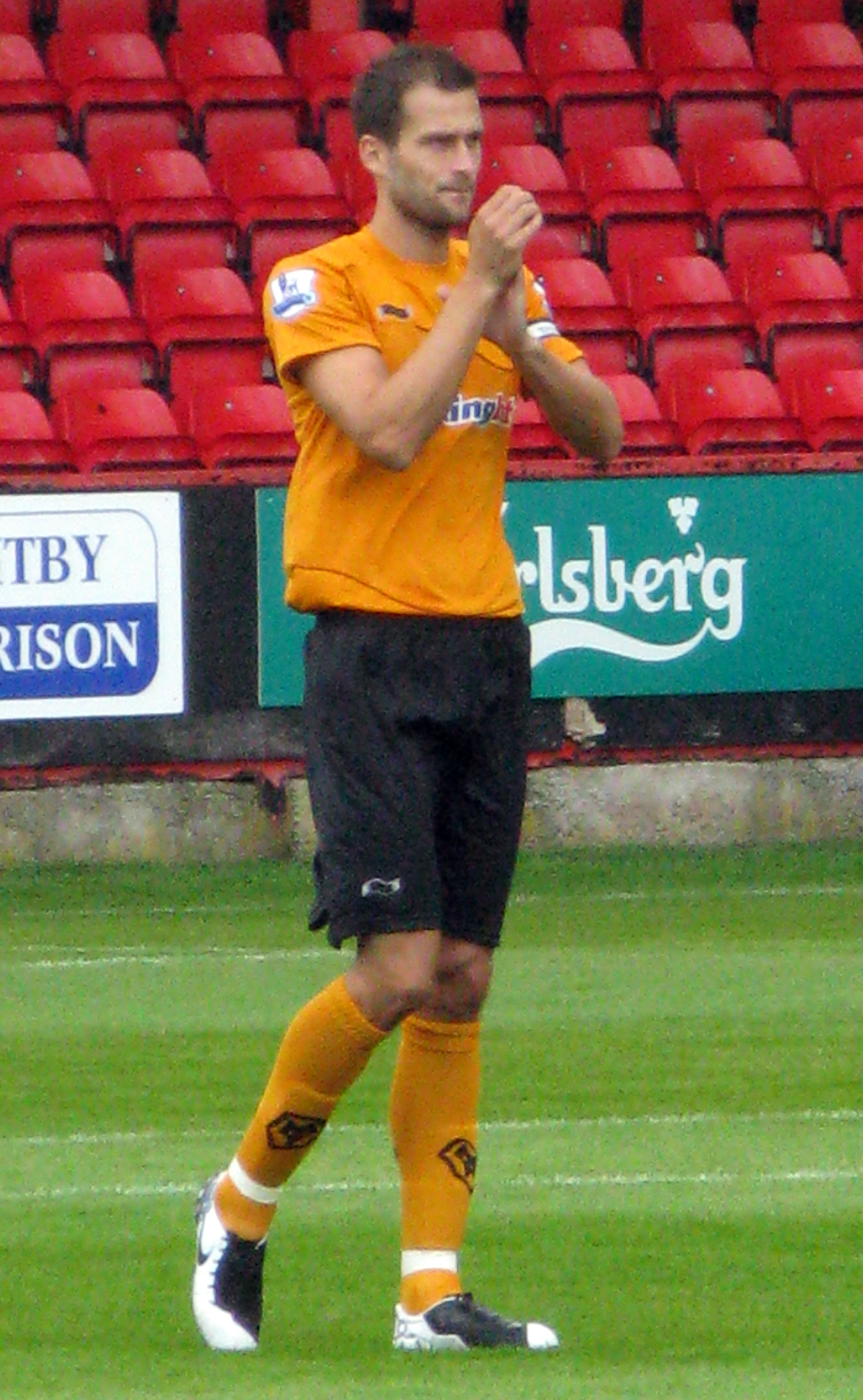
Roger Johnson was appointed captain upon signing but had a troubled season.

In preparation for the season, the club made three signings during the summer transfer window. Jamie O'Hara, who had spent part of the previous season on loan at Wolves, was tied to a permanent deal, while defender Roger Johnson who had suffered relegation with Birmingham City was also bought. Goalkeeper Dorus de Vries was signed on a free transfer, having rejected a new deal at newly promoted Swansea, to provide competition to Wayne Hennessey. Having recruited extensively in the previous two summers since promotion, the addition of only three new players was a change in tack by the club, with chairman Steve Morgan stating "We don't need to do what we did the last two summers because the nucleus is there - the nucleus is 24-26 years-old. That's the heart of the team and they'll get better together."

The players began pre-season training on 5 July with six-day stay at a training camp in County Kildare, Ireland. After returning to England the team undertook six pre-season matches, concluding with the only friendly at their Molineux home, a game against La Liga side Real Zaragoza.

Competitive action began with a 2–1 victory at Blackburn, the same opponent that they had faced on the final day of the previous season when they narrowly avoided relegation. A second win arrived in their next fixture, a home game against Fulham which was played with the North Bank stand closed to spectators due to its on-going reconstruction. Owing to the different kick-off times of matches, for a few hours after this victory Wolves briefly sat top of the Premier League.

An away point at Aston Villa continued their best opening to a top flight campaign in decades, but defeat at home to Tottenham halted this run. The team then began to drop down the table after suffering a run of six defeats in their next seven matches. Three points were finally gained after defeating Wigan in early November, and after two away defeats, a second successive home win was gained by beating Sunderland.

The Christmas/New Year period added more points, including from two trips to face Arsenal and Tottenham, but no further victories. The two North London clubs also provided Wolves with their two loan signings of the January window with defender Sébastien Bassong (from Tottenham) and midfielder Emmanuel Frimpong (from Arsenal) joining for the remainder of the campaign. Frimpong's service would be however be limited to five appearances as he soon ruptured cruciate ligaments in his knee and returned to his parent club.

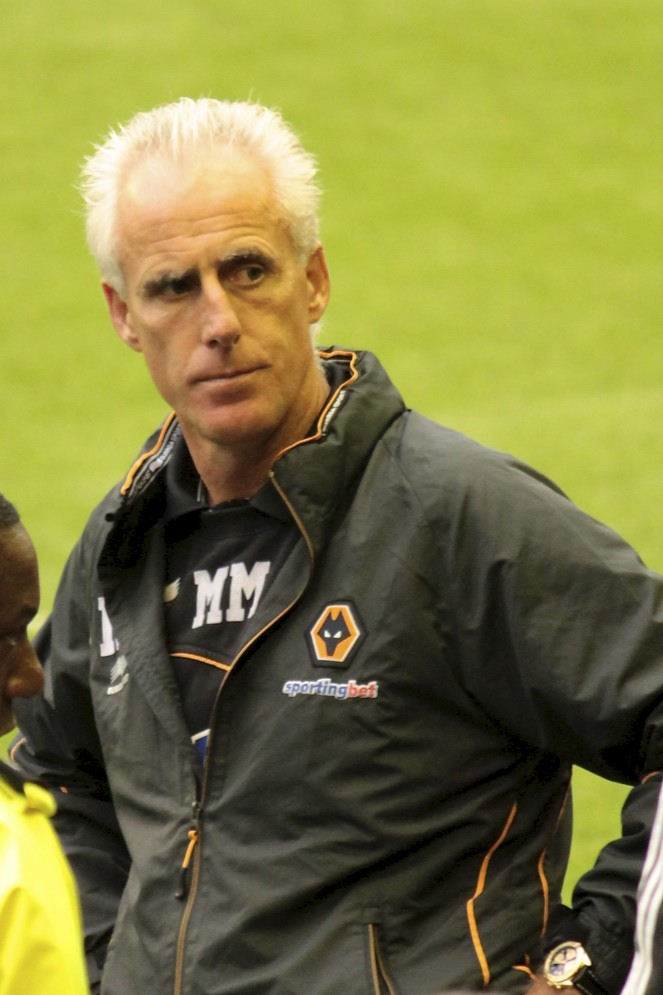
Mick McCarthy was fired in February 2012 after a run of one win in 13 games.

Former Wolves starlet Robbie Keane returned to Molineux in mid-January with his loan club Aston Villa and scored twice to turn a 2–1 Wolves lead into a 2–3 defeat that dropped the club into the relegation zone for the first time. Another home loss three days later to Liverpool prompted chairman Steve Morgan to enter the dressing room after the game. Manager Mick McCarthy conceded that he was not pleased by this event but that he didn't feel his authority had been eroded.

Their following fixture brought their first win in twelve attempts – including two matches against Championship side Birmingham City in the FA Cup before their elimination. The 2–1 win at fellow strugglers, newly promoted QPR was to be both their final victory of the season and, ultimately, the final one of McCarthy's reign.

A 1–5 home thrashing at the hands of local rivals West Brom in their next game proved to be McCarthy's final in charge of Wolves. The morning after the match he was sacked after five-and-a-half years at the helm, the longest reign of any Wolves manager since Graham Turner in the late 1980s/early 1990s. Despite this dismissal both the club and McCarthy maintained an amicable stance, with many players also expressing regret at the turn of events.

The search for McCarthy's successor began immediately, with CEO Jez Moxey setting a provisional timetable for an appointment before their next fixture in twelve days time. Their pursuit of a new manager turned into a much-maligned event in the media, with a large number of candidates being linked with the position, and seemingly turning it down. The two most strongly linked candidates were the former Charlton and West Ham manager Alan Curbishley and Steve Bruce, recently fired by Sunderland. Both were widely reported as having been interviewed by the Wolves hierarchy.

Ultimately, neither were appointed and instead the task of managing the team was given to assistant manager Terry Connor for the remaining thirteen games of the season. This decision was derided for being in contrast to Moxey's early-stated belief that the job was "not for a novice"; with Connor having no previous management roles. Over the following weeks it emerged that Alan Curbishley was the only candidate who had also been offered the post but, after initially accepting it, had later had second thoughts and declined it.

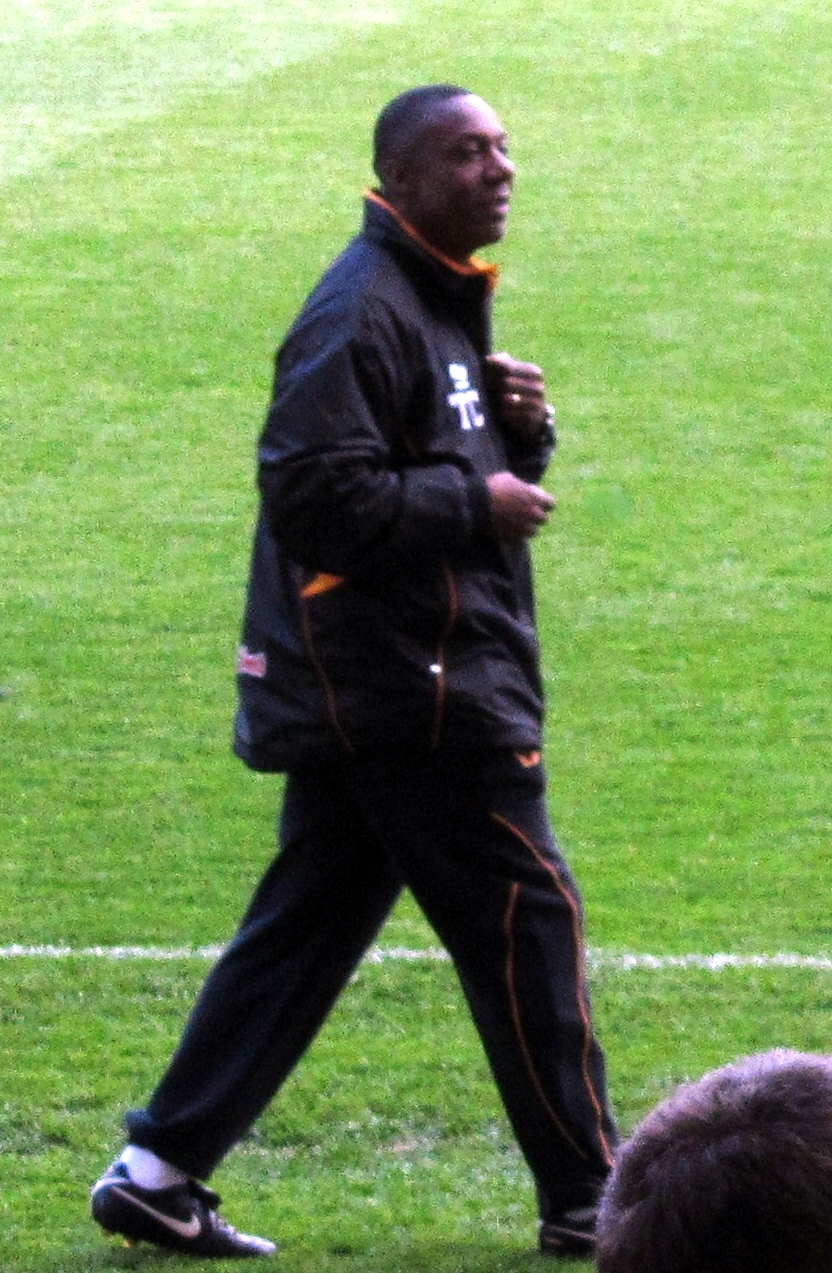
Assistant manager Terry Connor was promoted to lead the team in their final 13 games.

Connor's first game at the helm brought a point as the team battled back from two goals down to draw 2–2 at Champions League hopefuls Newcastle. However things soon fell apart under Connor's control with the team losing their next seven consecutive matches, including a pair of 0–5 defeats, that left them mired at the foot of the table. Key home defeats to relegation rivals Blackburn and Bolton only worsened their prospects of avoiding the drop. During this period captain Roger Johnson was fined by the club for arriving at training under the influence of alcohol.

Although a goalless draw at Sunderland in mid-April eventually halted their losing streak, as well as a club record run of 30 league games without a clean sheet, only a finish of four consecutive wins could by this point prevent relegation. As it was, they lost their very next game, a 0–2 loss to eventual champions Manchester City and so confirmed their relegation with three games remaining. This brought to an end their Premier League status after three years, their longest consecutive stay in the top flight since the period 1977–82.

Two further points were gained to bring their final points tally to 25, one of the lowest recorded in any league campaign during the club's existence as well as the lowest in the Premier League for four seasons. On the eve of their final fixture the club announced that Connor, who had hoped to become a permanent appointment, would not be retained as manager and Norwegian coach Ståle Solbakken would instead take charge from July onward. Connor had failed to win any of his thirteen games in charge and gained just four points from a potential 39.

== Results ==
=== Preseason ===
Wolves' six pre season games saw them face opposition from three different leagues, including a match in front of a 33,681 crowd at Celtic, the largest attendance at one of Wolves' pre season matches for some years. As had become common in recent years, only their final game was held at their Molineux home. A second "Wolves Development XI" team largely comprising academy prospects also played a series of matches during this period.

| 16 July 2011 | Crewe Alexandra | 2–1 | Wolverhampton Wanderers | Crewe |
| 15:00 BST | Miller 44'; Sarcevic 85' | Report | Doyle 81' | Stadium: Alexandra Stadium; Attendance: 2,567; Referee: Anthony Bates |

| 19 July 2011 | Walsall | 2–3 | Wolverhampton Wanderers | Walsall |
| 19:55 BST | Macken 20'; Grigg 42' | Report | Kightly 14'; Griffiths 40'; Berra 66' | Stadium: Banks's Stadium; Attendance: 5,065 (2,524 away); Referee: Steve Rushton |

| 23 July 2011 | Notts County | 1–1 | Wolverhampton Wanderers | Nottingham |
| 15:00 BST | Bishop 90' | Report | Jarvis 28' | Stadium: Meadow Lane; Attendance: 2,840; Referee: David Coote |

| 27 July 2011 | Celtic | 0–2 | Wolverhampton Wanderers | Glasgow |
| 19:45 BST | | Report | O'Hara 27'; Twardzik 73' (o.g.) | Stadium: Celtic Park; Attendance: 33,681 (737 away); Referee: Alan Muir |

| 30 July 2011 | Ipswich Town | 1–2 | Wolverhampton Wanderers | Ipswich |
| 15:00 BST | Bowyer 44' | Report | Hunt 76'; Ebanks-Blake 84' (pen.) | Stadium: Portman Road; Attendance: 5,945; Referee: Darren Deadman |

| 6 August 2011 | Wolverhampton Wanderers | 2–0 | Real Zaragoza | Wolverhampton |
| 15:00 BST | Elokobi 59'; Fletcher 65' | Report | | Stadium: Molineux; Attendance: 11,069; Referee: Anthony Taylor |

"Wolves Development XI" pre season results (all away): 3–2 vs Monaghan United (12 July), 3–0 vs Lisburn Distillery (15 July), 0–2 vs Shrewsbury Town (22 July), 1–1 vs Wrexham (26 July), 2–4 vs Kidderminster Harriers (29 July), 3–0 vs Airbus (1 August), 1–3 vs Telford United (8 August)

=== Premier League ===
A total of 20 teams competed in the Premier League in the 2011–12 season. Each team played every other team twice: once at their stadium, and once at the opposition's. Three points were awarded to teams for each win, one point per draw, and none for defeats.

The provisional fixture list was released on 17 June 2011, but was subject to change in the event of matches being selected for television coverage or police concerns.

| 13 August 2011 1 | Blackburn Rovers | 1–2 | Wolverhampton Wanderers | Blackburn |
| 15:00 BST | Formica 20' | Report | Fletcher 22'; Ward 47' | Stadium: Ewood Park; Attendance: 21,996 (3,533 away fans); Referee: Kevin Friend |

| 21 August 2011 2 | Wolverhampton Wanderers | 2–0 | Fulham | Wolverhampton |
| 14:05 BST | Doyle 42'; Jarvis 45+1' | Report | | Stadium: Molineux; Attendance: 22,657 (717 away fans); Referee: Mike Dean |

| 27 August 2011 3 | Aston Villa | 0–0 | Wolverhampton Wanderers | Birmingham |
| 12:05 BST | | Report | | Stadium: Villa Park; Attendance: 30,076 (1,743 away fans); Referee: Martin Atkinson |

| 10 September 2011 4 | Wolverhampton Wanderers | 0–2 | Tottenham Hotspur | Wolverhampton |
| 15:00 BST | | Report | Adebayor 67'; Defoe 80' | Stadium: Molineux; Attendance: 25,274 (1,350 away fans); Referee: Peter Walton |

| 17 September 2011 5 | Wolverhampton Wanderers | 0–3 | Queens Park Rangers | Wolverhampton |
| 15:00 BST | | Report | Barton 8'; Faurlín 10'; Campbell 87' | Stadium: Molineux; Attendance: 24,189 (1,350 away fans); Referee: Anthony Taylor |

| 24 September 2011 6 | Liverpool | 2–1 | Wolverhampton Wanderers | Liverpool |
| 15:00 BST | Johnson 11' (o.g.); Suárez 38' | Report | Fletcher 49' | Stadium: Anfield; Attendance: 44,922 (1,956 away fans); Referee: Kevin Friend |

| 1 October 2011 7 | Wolverhampton Wanderers | 1–2 | Newcastle United | Wolverhampton |
| 15:00 BST | Fletcher 88' | Report | Ba 17'; Gutiérrez 38' | Stadium: Molineux; Attendance: 26,561 (1,350 away fans); Referee: Mark Halsey |

| 16 October 2011 8 | West Bromwich Albion | 2–0 | Wolverhampton Wanderers | West Bromwich |
| 12:00 BST | Brunt 8'; Odemwingie 75' | Report | | Stadium: The Hawthorns; Attendance: 24,872 (2,600 away fans); Referee: Chris Foy |

| 22 October 2011 9 | Wolverhampton Wanderers | 2–2 | Swansea City | Wolverhampton |
| 12:45 BST | Doyle 84'; O'Hara 86' | Report | Graham 23'; Allen 35' | Stadium: Molineux; Attendance: 25,216 (2,106 away fans); Referee: Michael Oliver |

| 29 October 2011 10 | Manchester City | 3–1 | Wolverhampton Wanderers | Manchester |
| 15:00 BST | Džeko 52'; Kolarov 67'; A. Johnson 90+1' | Report | Hunt 75' (pen.) | Stadium: City of Manchester Stadium; Attendance: 47,142 (1,629 away fans); Referee: Stuart Attwell |

| 6 November 2011 11 | Wolverhampton Wanderers | 3–1 | Wigan Athletic | Wolverhampton |
| 13:30 GMT | O'Hara 31'; Edwards 55'; Ward 66' | Report | Watson 42' | Stadium: Molineux; Attendance: 23,536 (482 away fans); Referee: Lee Probert |

| 19 November 2011 12 | Everton | 2–1 | Wolverhampton Wanderers | Liverpool |
| 15:00 GMT | Jagielka 44'; Baines 83' (pen.) | Report | Hunt 37' (pen.) | Stadium: Goodison Park; Attendance: 33,953 (1,739 away fans); Referee: Jon Moss |

| 26 November 2011 13 | Chelsea | 3–0 | Wolverhampton Wanderers | London |
| 15:00 GMT | Terry 7'; Sturridge 29'; Mata 45' | Report | | Stadium: Stamford Bridge; Attendance: 41,648 (1,472 away fans); Referee: Lee Mason |

| 4 December 2011 14 | Wolverhampton Wanderers | 2–1 | Sunderland | Wolverhampton |
| 16:00 GMT | Fletcher 73', 81' | Report | Richardson 52'; Larsson (penalty missed) 73' | Stadium: Molineux; Attendance: 25,145 (1,235 away fans); Referee: Phil Dowd |

| 10 December 2011 15 | Manchester United | 4–1 | Wolverhampton Wanderers | Manchester |
| 15:00 GMT | Nani 17', 56'; Rooney 27', 62' | Report | Fletcher 47' | Stadium: Old Trafford; Attendance: 75,627 (1,400 away fans); Referee: Michael Oliver |

| 17 December 2011 16 | Wolverhampton Wanderers | 1–2 | Stoke City | Wolverhampton |
| 15:00 GMT | Hunt 17' (pen.) | Report | Doyle 58' (o.g.); Crouch 70' | Stadium: Molineux; Attendance: 24,684 (2,271 away fans); Referee: Anthony Taylor |

| 20 December 2011 17 | Wolverhampton Wanderers | 2–2 | Norwich City | Wolverhampton |
| 19:45 GMT | Ebanks-Blake 37'; Zubar 82' | Report | Surman 12'; Jackson 76' | Stadium: Molineux; Attendance: 27,067 (2,356 away fans); Referee: Chris Foy |

| 27 December 2011 18 | Arsenal | 1–1 | Wolverhampton Wanderers | London |
| 15:00 GMT | Gervinho 8' | Report | Fletcher 38' | Stadium: Emirates Stadium; Attendance: 59,686 (1,918 away fans); Referee: Stuart Attwell |

| 31 December 2011 19 | Bolton Wanderers | 1–1 | Wolverhampton Wanderers | Bolton |
| 15:00 GMT | Ricketts 22' | Report | Fletcher 49' | Stadium: Reebok Stadium; Attendance: 20,354 (2,450 away fans); Referee: Mark Clattenburg |

| 2 January 2012 20 | Wolverhampton Wanderers | 1–2 | Chelsea | Wolverhampton |
| 15:00 GMT | Ward 84' | Report | Ramires 54'; Lampard 89' | Stadium: Molineux; Attendance: 27,289 (2,314 away fans); Referee: Peter Walton |

| 14 January 2012 21 | Tottenham Hotspur | 1–1 | Wolverhampton Wanderers | London |
| 15:00 GMT | Modrić 51' | Report | Fletcher 22' | Stadium: White Hart Lane; Attendance: 36,194 (1,800 away fans); Referee: Mike Jones |

| 21 January 2012 22 | Wolverhampton Wanderers | 2–3 | Aston Villa | Wolverhampton |
| 15:00 GMT | Kightly 21'; Edwards 31' | Report | Bent 11' (pen.); Keane 51', 84' | Stadium: Molineux; Attendance: 27,084 (2,312 away fans); Referee: Michael Oliver |

| 31 January 2012 23 | Wolverhampton Wanderers | 0–3 | Liverpool | Wolverhampton |
| 19:45 GMT | | Report | Carroll 52'; Bellamy 61'; Kuyt 78' | Stadium: Molineux; Attendance: 27,447 (2,336 away fans); Referee: Anthony Taylor |

| 4 February 2012 24 | Queens Park Rangers | 1–2 | Wolverhampton Wanderers | London |
| 15:00 GMT | Zamora 16' | Report | Jarvis 46'; Doyle 71' | Stadium: Loftus Road; Attendance: 17,351 (1,643 away fans); Referee: Mark Clattenburg |

| 12 February 2012 25 | Wolverhampton Wanderers | 1–5 | West Bromwich Albion | Wolverhampton |
| 13:30 GMT | Fletcher 45+1' | Report | Odemwingie 34', 77', 88'; Olsson 64'; Andrews 85' | Stadium: Molineux; Attendance: 27,131 (2,359 away fans); Referee: Lee Mason |

| 25 February 2012 26 | Newcastle United | 2–2 | Wolverhampton Wanderers | Newcastle upon Tyne |
| 15:00 GMT | Cissé 6'; Gutiérrez 18' | Report | Jarvis 50'; Doyle 66' | Stadium: Sports Direct Arena; Attendance: 52,287 (1,562 away fans); Referee: Peter Walton |

| 4 March 2012 27 | Fulham | 5–0 | Wolverhampton Wanderers | London |
| 14:05 GMT | Pogrebnyak 36', 44', 61'; Dempsey 56', 83' | Report | | Stadium: Craven Cottage; Attendance: 24,034 (1,312 away fans); Referee: Mike Jones |

| 10 March 2012 28 | Wolverhampton Wanderers | 0–2 | Blackburn Rovers | Wolverhampton |
| 15:00 GMT | | Report | Hoilett 43', 69' | Stadium: Molineux; Attendance: 26,121 (1,350 away fans); Referee: Chris Foy |

| 18 March 2012 29 | Wolverhampton Wanderers | 0–5 | Manchester United | Wolverhampton |
| 13:30 GMT | | Report | Evans 21'; Valencia 43'; Welbeck 45+1'; Hernández 56', 61' | Stadium: Molineux; Attendance: 27,494 (2,370 away fans); Referee: Anthony Taylor |

| 24 March 2012 30 | Norwich City | 2–1 | Wolverhampton Wanderers | Norwich |
| 15:00 GMT | Holt 26', 45+1' (pen.) | Report | Jarvis 25' | Stadium: Carrow Road; Attendance: 26,752 (1,322 away fans); Referee: Mark Clattenburg |

| 31 March 2012 31 | Wolverhampton Wanderers | 2–3 | Bolton Wanderers | Wolverhampton |
| 15:00 BST | Kightly 53'; Jarvis 88' | Report | Petrov 63' (pen.); Alonso 80'; Davies 84' | Stadium: Molineux; Attendance: 25,215 (1,350 away fans); Referee: Jon Moss |

| 7 April 2012 32 | Stoke City | 2–1 | Wolverhampton Wanderers | Stoke-on-Trent |
| 17:30 BST | Huth 37'; Crouch 61' | Report | Kightly 26' | Stadium: Britannia Stadium; Attendance: 27,005 (986 away fans); Referee: Mark Halsey |

| 11 April 2012 33 | Wolverhampton Wanderers | 0–3 | Arsenal | Wolverhampton |
| 19:45 BST | | Report | Van Persie 9' (pen.); Walcott 11'; Benayoun 69' | Stadium: Molineux; Attendance: 25,815 (2,368 away fans); Referee: Neil Swarbrick |

| 14 April 2012 34 | Sunderland | 0–0 | Wolverhampton Wanderers | Sunderland |
| 15:00 BST | | Report | | Stadium: Stadium of Light; Attendance: 37,476 (559 away fans); Referee: Mike Jones |

| 22 April 2012 35 | Wolverhampton Wanderers | 0–2 | Manchester City | Wolverhampton |
| 16:00 BST | | Report | Agüero 27'; Nasri 74' | Stadium: Molineux; Attendance: 24,576 (2,369 away fans); Referee: Lee Probert |

| 28 April 2012 36 | Swansea City | 4–4 | Wolverhampton Wanderers | Swansea |
| 15:00 BST | Orlandi 1'; Allen 4'; Dyer 15'; Graham 31' | Report | Fletcher 28'; Jarvis 33', 69'; Edwards 54' | Stadium: Liberty Stadium; Attendance: 19,408 (909 away fans); Referee: Jon Moss |

| 6 May 2012 37 | Wolverhampton Wanderers | 0–0 | Everton | Wolverhampton |
| 14:00 BST | | Report | | Stadium: Molineux; Attendance: 25,466 (2,364 away fans); Referee: Lee Mason |

| 13 May 2012 38 | Wigan Athletic | 3–2 | Wolverhampton Wanderers | Wigan |
| 15:00 BST | Di Santo 12'; Boyce 14', 79' | Report | Jarvis 9'; Fletcher 86' | Stadium: DW Stadium; Attendance: 21,986 (2,541 away fans); Referee: Michael Oliver |

Final table

| Pos | Team | Pld | W | D | L | GF | GA | GD | Pts |
|---|---|---|---|---|---|---|---|---|---|
| 17 | Queens Park Rangers | 38 | 10 | 7 | 21 | 43 | 66 | –23 | 37 |
| 18 | Bolton Wanderers | 38 | 10 | 6 | 22 | 46 | 77 | –31 | 36 |
| 19 | Blackburn Rovers | 38 | 8 | 7 | 23 | 47 | 78 | –30 | 31 |
| 20 | Wolverhampton Wanderers | 38 | 5 | 10 | 23 | 40 | 82 | –42 | 25 |

Source: Statto

Results Summary

| Overall | | | | | | | | Home | | | | | | Away | | | | | |
| Pld | W | D | L | GF | GA | GD | Pts | W | D | L | GF | GA | GD | W | D | L | GF | GA | GD |
|---|---|---|---|---|---|---|---|---|---|---|---|---|---|---|---|---|---|---|---|
| 38 | 5 | 10 | 23 | 40 | 82 | −42 | 25 | 3 | 3 | 13 | 19 | 43 | −24 | 2 | 7 | 10 | 21 | 39 | −18 |

Source: Statto

Results by round

| Round | 1 | 2 | 3 | 4 | 5 | 6 | 7 | 8 | 9 | 10 | 11 | 12 | 13 | 14 | 15 | 16 | 17 | 18 | 19 | 20 | 21 | 22 | 23 | 24 | 25 | 26 | 27 | 28 | 29 | 30 | 31 | 32 | 33 | 34 | 35 | 36 | 37 | 38 |
|---|---|---|---|---|---|---|---|---|---|---|---|---|---|---|---|---|---|---|---|---|---|---|---|---|---|---|---|---|---|---|---|---|---|---|---|---|---|---|
| Result | W | W | D | L | L | L | L | L | D | L | W | L | L | W | L | L | D | D | D | L | D | L | L | W | L | D | L | L | L | L | L | L | L | D | L | D | D | L |
| Position | 2 | 2 | 3 | 7 | 10 | 11 | 12 | 16 | 15 | 17 | 13 | 17 | 17 | 15 | 16 | 17 | 16 | 17 | 16 | 16 | 16 | 19 | 19 | 17 | 18 | 16 | 18 | 19 | 20 | 20 | 20 | 20 | 20 | 20 | 20 | 20 | 20 | 20 |

Source: Statto.com
W = Win; D = Draw; L = Loss

=== FA Cup ===
| 7 January 2012 3rd round | Birmingham City | 0–0 | Wolverhampton Wanderers | Birmingham |
| 12:30 GMT | | Report | | Stadium: St Andrew's; Attendance: 14,594 (2,488 away fans); Referee: Mike Dean |

| 18 January 2012 3rd round replay | Wolverhampton Wanderers | 0–1 | Birmingham City | Wolverhampton |
| 20:00 GMT | | Report | Elliott 74' | Stadium: Molineux; Attendance: 10,153 (2,157 away fans); Referee: Howard Webb |

=== League Cup ===
| 23 August 2011 2nd Round | Northampton Town | 0–4 | Wolverhampton Wanderers | Northampton |
| 19:45 BST | | Report | Ebanks-Blake 31', 77'; Milijaš 37'; Vokes 88' | Stadium: Sixfields Stadium; Attendance: 5,512 (1,026 away fans); Referee: Carl Boyeson |

| 20 September 2011 3rd Round | Wolverhampton Wanderers | 5–0 | Millwall | Wolverhampton |
| 19:45 BST | Edwards 3'; Hammill 7'; Elokobi 38'; Vokes 77'; Guedioura 88' | Report | | Stadium: Molineux; Attendance: 7,748 (329 away fans); Referee: Kevin Wright |

| 26 October 2011 4th Round | Wolverhampton Wanderers | 2–5 | Manchester City | Wolverhampton |
| 19:45 BST | Milijaš 18'; O'Hara 65' | Report | Johnson 37'; Nasri 39'; Džeko 40', 64' de Vries 50' (o.g.) | Stadium: Molineux; Attendance: 12,436 (2,344 away fans); Referee: Neil Swarbrick |

== Players ==
Squad rules operated in the Premier League for the season. Squads were capped at 25 senior players (those aged 21 and above at the beginning of 2011), and all squads had to include a minimum of 8 "homegrown" players. Wolves squads included 16, then 15, such players.

=== Statistics ===
Key:
‡ On loan from another club * First appearance(s) for the club

- # = Squad number
- Pos = Playing position
- P = Number of games played
- G = Number of goals scored
- GK = Goalkeeper
- DF = Defender
- MF = Midfielder
- FW = Forward
- = Yellow cards
- = Red cards
- † Permanent player left club during the season
- ¤ Loaned to another club for part or all of season

Correct as of end of season. Starting appearances are listed first, followed by substitute appearances in parentheses where applicable.

| No. | Pos | Name | P | G | P | G | P | G | P | G | A yellow card | A red card | Notes |
| No. | Pos | Name | League | | FA Cup | | League Cup | | Total | | Discipline | | Notes |
|---|---|---|---|---|---|---|---|---|---|---|---|---|---|
| 1 | GK | (Wales) Wayne Hennessey | 34 | 0 | 0 | 0 | 0 | 0 | 34 | 0 | 1 | 0 | |
| 3 | DF | (Cameroon) George Elokobi ¤ | 3(6) | 0 | 1 | 0 | 3 | 1 | 7(6) | 1 | 0 | 0 | |
| 4 | MF | (Wales) David Edwards | 24(2) | 3 | 0 | 0 | 2 | 1 | 26(2) | 4 | 2 | 0 | |
| 5 | DF | (England) Richard Stearman | 28(2) | 0 | 2 | 0 | 1 | 0 | 31(2) | 0 | 6 | 0 | |
| 6 | DF | (England) Jody Craddock | 1 | 0 | 0 | 0 | 2 | 0 | 3 | 0 | 1 | 0 | |
| 7 | MF | (England) Michael Kightly ¤ | 14(4) | 3 | 1 | 0 | 1(1) | 0 | 16(5) | 3 | 2 | 0 | |
| 8 | MF | (England) Karl Henry | 30(1) | 0 | 1 | 0 | 0(1) | 0 | 31(2) | 0 | 7 | 1 | |
| 9 | FW | (England) Sylvan Ebanks-Blake | 8(15) | 1 | 2 | 0 | 1 | 2 | 11(15) | 3 | 1 | 0 | |
| 10 | FW | (Scotland) Steven Fletcher | 26(6) | 12 | 0(2) | 0 | 0 | 0 | 26(8) | 12 | 2 | 0 | |
| 11 | DF | (Republic of Ireland) Stephen Ward | 38 | 3 | 1(1) | 0 | 1 | 0 | 40(1) | 3 | 2 | 0 | |
| 12 | MF | (Republic of Ireland) Stephen Hunt | 16(8) | 3 | 2 | 0 | 2 | 0 | 20(8) | 3 | 6 | 0 | |
| 13 | GK | (Nigeria) Carl Ikeme ¤ | 0(1) | 0 | 0 | 0 | 0 | 0 | 0(1) | 0 | 0 | 0 | |
| 14 | DF | (England) Roger Johnson (c) | 26(1) | 0 | 1 | 0 | 0 | 0 | 27(1) | 0 | 6 | 0 | |
| 15 | MF | (Ghana) Emmanuel Frimpong ‡ | 5 | 0 | 0 | 0 | 0 | 0 | 5 | 0 | 1 | 0 | (Note: Frimpong's loan spell was cut short after he ruptured cruciate ligaments in his knee.) |
| 16 | DF | (Scotland) Christophe Berra | 29(3) | 0 | 2 | 0 | 1 | 0 | 32(3) | 0 | 5 | 0 | |
| 17 | MF | (England) Matt Jarvis | 31(6) | 8 | 0(1) | 0 | 0(1) | 0 | 31(8) | 8 | 0 | 0 | |
| 18 | FW | (Wales) Sam Vokes ¤ | 0(4) | 0 | 0 | 0 | 3 | 2 | 3(4) | 2 | 1 | 0 | |
| 19 | MF | (England) Adam Hammill ¤ | 3(6) | 0 | 1 | 0 | 2(1) | 1 | 6(7) | 1 | 2 | 0 | |
| 20 | MF | (Serbia) Nenad Milijaš | 6(14) | 0 | 1 | 0 | 3 | 2 | 10(14) | 2 | 2 | 1 | |
| 21 | FW | (Republic of Ireland) Andy Keogh ¤ † | 0 | 0 | 0 | 0 | 0 | 0 | 0 | 0 | 0 | 0 | |
| 21 | DF | (Cameroon) Sébastien Bassong ‡ | 9 | 0 | 0 | 0 | 0 | 0 | 9 | 0 | 1 | 1 | |
| 22 | DF | (France) Steven Mouyokolo ¤ | 0 | 0 | 0 | 0 | 0 | 0 | 0 | 0 | 0 | 0 | |
| 22 | MF | (Iceland) Eggert Jónsson | 2(1) | 0 | 2 | 0 | 0 | 0 | 4(1) | 0 | 1 | 0 | |
| 23 | DF | (Guadeloupe) Ronald Zubar | 14(1) | 1 | 0 | 0 | 0 | 0 | 15(1) | 1 | 4 | 1 | |
| 24 | MF | (England) Jamie O'Hara | 19 | 2 | 0 | 0 | 0(1) | 1 | 19(1) | 3 | 6 | 0 | |
| 25 | DF | (England) Danny Batth ¤ | 0 | 0 | 0 | 0 | 0 | 0 | 0 | 0 | 0 | 0 | |
| 26 | MF | (England) David Davis ¤ | 6(1) | 0 | 0 | 0 | 0(1) | 0 | 6(2) | 0 | 0 | 0 | |
| 27 | FW | (England) Sam Winnall ¤ | 0 | 0 | 0 | 0 | 0 | 0 | 0 | 0 | 0 | 0 | |
| 28 | FW | (Scotland) Leigh Griffiths ¤ | 0 | 0 | 0 | 0 | 0(1) | 0 | 0(1) | 0 | 0 | 0 | |
| 29 | FW | (Republic of Ireland) Kevin Doyle | 25(7) | 4 | 2 | 0 | 1 | 0 | 28(7) | 4 | 4 | 0 | |
| 30 | DF | (Republic of Ireland) Matt Doherty ¤ | 0(1) | 0 | 1 | 0 | 3 | 0 | 4(1) | 0 | 0 | 0 | |
| 31 | GK | (Netherlands) Dorus de Vries | 4 | 0 | 2 | 0 | 3 | 0 | 9 | 0 | 0 | 0 | |
| 32 | DF | (Republic of Ireland) Kevin Foley | 12(5) | 0 | 0(1) | 0 | 1 | 0 | 13(6) | 0 | 0 | 0 | |
| 33 | FW | (Austria) Stefan Maierhofer † | 0(1) | 0 | 0 | 0 | 0 | 0 | 0(1) | 0 | 0 | 0 | |
| 34 | MF | (Algeria) Adlène Guedioura ¤ | 2(8) | 0 | 0(1) | 0 | 2 | 1 | 4(9) | 1 | 2 | 0 | |
| 35 | FW | (Wales) Jake Cassidy ¤ | 0 | 0 | 0 | 0 | 0 | 0 | 0 | 0 | 0 | 0 | |
| 36 | DF | (England) Scott Malone ¤ † | 0 | 0 | 0 | 0 | 0 | 0 | 0 | 0 | 0 | 0 | |
| 37 | MF | (Republic of Ireland) Anthony Forde | 3(3) | 0 | 0 | 0 | 0(1) | 0 | 3(4) | 0 | 0 | 0 | |
| 38 | MF | (England) Louis Harris ¤ | 0 | 0 | 0 | 0 | 0 | 0 | 0 | 0 | 0 | 0 | |
| 39 | DF | (England) Michael Ihiekwe | 0 | 0 | 0 | 0 | 0 | 0 | 0 | 0 | 0 | 0 | |
| 40 | FW | (England) Ashley Hemmings ¤ | 0 | 0 | 0 | 0 | 1 | 0 | 1 | 0 | 0 | 0 | |
| 41 | MF | (England) Jack Price | 0 | 0 | 0 | 0 | 0 | 0 | 0 | 0 | 0 | 0 | |
| 42 | FW | (England) James Spray | 0 | 0 | 0 | 0 | 0(1) | 0 | 0(1) | 0 | 0 | 0 | |
| 43 | DF | (England) Jamie Reckord ¤ | 0 | 0 | 0 | 0 | 1 | 0 | 1 | 0 | 0 | 0 | |
| 44 | MF | (England) Nathaniel Mendez-Laing ¤ | 0 | 0 | 0 | 0 | 0 | 0 | 0 | 0 | 0 | 0 | |
| 45 | GK | (Republic of Ireland) Aaron McCarey | 0 | 0 | 0 | 0 | 0 | 0 | 0 | 0 | 0 | 0 | |
| 46 | MF | (Northern Ireland) Johnny Gorman | 0(1) | 0 | 0 | 0 | 0 | 0 | 0(1) | 0 | 0 | 0 | |
| 47 | DF | (England) Ethan Ebanks-Landell | 0 | 0 | 0 | 0 | 0 | 0 | 0 | 0 | 0 | 0 | |
| 48 | MF | (Republic of Ireland) Brian McGroary † | 0 | 0 | 0 | 0 | 0 | 0 | 0 | 0 | 0 | 0 | |

=== Awards ===
| Award | Winner |
|---|---|
| Fans' Player of the Season | Wayne Hennessey |
| Players' Player of the Season | Steven Fletcher |
| Young Player of the Season | David Davis |
| Academy Player of the Season | Anthony Forde |
| Goal of the Season | Adlène Guedioura (vs Millwall, 20 September 2011) |

== Transfers ==
=== In ===
| Date | Player | From | Fee |
|---|---|---|---|
| 21 June 2011 | (England) Jamie O'Hara | Tottenham Hotspur | £5,000,000 |
| 22 June 2011 | (Netherlands) Dorus de Vries | Swansea City | Free |
| 1 July 2011 | (England) Luke Ifil | Arsenal | Free |
| 13 July 2011 | (England) Roger Johnson | Birmingham City | £5,000,000 |
| 1 January 2012 | (Iceland) Eggert Jónsson | (Scotland) Hearts | £200,000 |
| 1 February 2011 | (England) Dave Moli | Liverpool | Undisclosed |

=== Out ===
| Date | Player | To | Fee |
|---|---|---|---|
| June 2011 | (Brazil) Adriano Basso | Released | Free |
| June 2011 | (Republic of Ireland) John Dunleavy | Released | Free |
| June 2011 | (England) Sam Griffiths | Released | Free |
| June 2011 | (United States) Marcus Hahnemann | Released | Free |
| June 2011 | (England) David Jones | Released | Free |
| June 2011 | (England) Jordan Keane | Released | Free |
| June 2011 | (England) Andre Landell | Released | Free |
| June 2011 | (England) James Parsonage | Released | Free |
| June 2011 | (Republic of Ireland) Nathan Rooney | Released | Free |
| 11 July 2011 | (England) Greg Halford | Portsmouth | £1 million |
| 15 July 2011 | (England) Daniel East | Brighton & Hove Albion | Free |
| 23 August 2011 | (Austria) Stefan Maierhofer | (Austria) Red Bull Salzburg | Undisclosed |
| 1 January 2012 | (England) Scott Malone | Bournemouth | Undisclosed |
| 31 January 2012 | (Republic of Ireland) Andy Keogh | Millwall | Undisclosed |
| 13 February 2012 | (Republic of Ireland) Brian McGroary | (Northern Ireland) Derry City | Free |

=== Loans in ===
| Date | Player | From | End Date |
|---|---|---|---|
| 1 January 2012 | (Ghana) Emmanuel Frimpong | Arsenal | 6 February 2012 |
| 31 January 2012 | (Cameroon) Sébastien Bassong | Tottenham Hotspur | End of season |

=== Loans out ===
| Date | Player | To | End Date |
|---|---|---|---|
| 29 June 2011 | (France) Steven Mouyokolo | (France) Sochaux | End of season |
| 18 July 2011 | (England) Scott Malone | Bournemouth | 1 January 2012 |
| 26 July 2011 | (England) Danny Batth | Sheffield Wednesday | End of season |
| 2 August 2011 | (Nigeria) Carl Ikeme | Middlesbrough | 1 November 2011 |
| 5 August 2011 | (England) Nathaniel Mendez-Laing | Sheffield United | 3 January 2012 |
| 15 August 2011 | (Republic of Ireland) Andy Keogh | Leeds United | 2 January 2012 |
| 26 August 2011 | (England) Sam Winnall | Hereford United | 31 October 2011 |
| 27 August 2011 | (Scotland) Leigh Griffiths | (Scotland) Hibernian | End of season |
| 31 August 2011 | (England) David Davis | (Scotland) Inverness CT | 9 January 2012 |
| 3 October 2011 | (England) James Spray | Accrington Stanley | 30 October 2011 |
| 11 October 2011 | (England) Michael Kightly | Watford | 3 January 2012 |
| 10 November 2011 | (Nigeria) Carl Ikeme | Doncaster Rovers | 4 January 2012 |
| 18 November 2011 | (Wales) Sam Vokes | Burnley | 15 January 2012 |
| 24 November 2011 | (England) Ashley Hemmings | Plymouth Argyle | End of season |
| 13 January 2012 | (England) David Davis | Chesterfield | 6 March 2012 |
| 26 January 2012 | (England) Sam Winnall | (Scotland) Inverness CT | End of season |
| 30 January 2012 | (England) Jamie Reckord | Scunthorpe United | End of season |
| 30 January 2012 | (Wales) Sam Vokes | Brighton & Hove Albion | End of season |
| 30 January 2012 | (Algeria) Adlène Guedioura | Nottingham Forest | End of season |
| 31 January 2012 | (Republic of Ireland) Matt Doherty | (Scotland) Hibernian | End of season |
| 9 February 2012 | (Cameroon) George Elokobi | Nottingham Forest | End of season |
| 1 March 2012 | (England) Adam Hammill | Middlesbrough | End of season |
| 1 March 2012 | (Nigeria) Carl Ikeme | Doncaster Rovers | 18 April 2012 |
| 16 March 2012 | (Wales) Jake Cassidy | Tranmere Rovers | End of season |
| 22 March 2012 | (England) Louis Harris | Notts County | End of season |

== Management and coaching staff ==
| Position | Name |
|---|---|
| Manager | Mick McCarthy, then Terry Connor |
| Assistant manager | Terry Connor, then Steve Weaver |
| Development coach | Steve Weaver |
| First Team Fitness and Conditioning coach | Tony Daley |
| Goalkeeping coach | Pat Mountain |
| Academy Manager | Kevin Thelwell |
| Assistant Academy Manager / Under-18's coach | Mick Halsall |
| Club Doctor | Dr Matthew Perry |
| Head of medical department | Steve Kemp |
| Club Physio | Phil Hayward |

== Kit ==
The season brought a new home kit, manufactured by supplier BURRDA. The new home kit featured the club's traditional gold and black colours, with the shirt removing the black collar design for a rounded gold neck. The away kit, retained from the previous season, was all black with gold piping. Both shirts featured the internet gambling company Sportingbet.com as sponsor.
