= 2005–06 Tottenham Hotspur F.C. season =

English football club season

Tottenham Hotspur
2005–06 season
- Chairman: Daniel Levy
- Manager: Martin Jol
- Premier League: 5th
- FA Cup: Third round
- League Cup: Second round
- Top goalscorer: League: Robbie Keane (16); All: Robbie Keane (16)
Home colours	Away colours	Third colours

The 2005–06 season was Tottenham Hotspur's 14th season in the Premier League and 28th successive season in the top division of the English football league system. The club also participated in the FA Cup and the Football League Cup.

== Season summary ==
During the 2005–06 English football season, Tottenham Hotspur participated in the English Premier League. The club had a mixed, short season, securing what was their highest place finish in the Premier league at the time, (Note: Tottenham's last highest finish was a 3rd place finish in the 1989–90 season of the Football League First Division.) but exiting both cup competitions at the earliest possible stage against lower league opposition, therefore playing just 40 games.

In September, Tottenham faced Grimsby Town in the League Cup, losing 1–0 at Blundell Park. Their FA Cup draw pitted the team against Leicester City, but the side let a two-goal lead slip, and an injury time goal saw them defeated 3–2 at Walkers Stadium.

In the league Tottenham had occupied the crucial fourth place in the table for much of the latter half of the season. Their win in their penultimate game of the season against Bolton Wanderers on 30 April meant they were seven points ahead of their nearest rivals Arsenal in the race for possible Champions League qualification. Despite Arsenal winning their two games in hand, Tottenham only had to match their result in the final game of the season in order to secure fourth spot.

On the morning of the decisive match against West Ham United a number of Tottenham players were taken ill with suspected food poisoning, the players having stayed the night at the Marriott Hotel in Canary Wharf and eaten lasagne. The club appealed for the Premier League to delay the kick off, but the police would not allow a kick off any later than 5pm, due to crowd control concerns, so the club decided to play at the scheduled time. Despite the scoreline being 1–1 for much of the game, Tottenham looked set to clinch fourth spot due to Arsenal trailing 2–1 at Highbury against Wigan Athletic. But Arsenal went on to win their fixture 4–2, with a Thierry Henry hat-trick, meaning Tottenham also required a win. Their fate was sealed when Yossi Benayoun scored a winner for West Ham, meaning Tottenham fell to fifth place and therefore would only play in the following season's UEFA Cup.

Tottenham appealed to the Premier League to have the match against West Ham replayed, but this was rejected as no grounds were found for accepting the request. Club chairman Daniel Levy called in the police to investigate the Marriott Hotel and threatened to sue the hotel chain and Premier League over the incident, having wrongly suspected foul play. Tests by the Health Protection Agency on the food at the hotel soon proved to be negative for sources of food poisoning and instead players were identified as having norovirus.

== First-team squad ==
Note: Flags indicate national team as defined under FIFA eligibility rules; some limited exceptions apply. Players may hold more than one non-FIFA nationality.

No.	Pos.	Nation	Player
1	GK	ENG	Paul Robinson
2	DF	MAR	Noureddine Naybet
3	DF	IRL	Stephen Kelly
5	MF	NED	Edgar Davids
6	MF	FIN	Teemu Tainio
7	DF	CAN	Paul Stalteri
8	MF	ENG	Danny Murphy
9	FW	POL	Grzegorz Rasiak
10	FW	IRL	Robbie Keane
12	GK	CZE	Radek Černý (on loan from Slavia Prague)
15	FW	EGY	Mido (on loan from Roma)
16	DF	KOR	Lee Young-Pyo

No.	Pos.	Nation	Player
18	FW	ENG	Jermain Defoe
19	MF	IRL	Andy Reid
20	DF	ENG	Michael Dawson
22	MF	ENG	Tom Huddlestone
23	MF	ENG	Michael Carrick
25	MF	ENG	Aaron Lennon
26	DF	ENG	Ledley King (captain)
27	DF	ENG	Calum Davenport
28	MF	ENG	Jermaine Jenas
30	DF	ENG	Anthony Gardner
32	MF	ENG	Johnnie Jackson
37	FW	ENG	Lee Barnard

=== Left club during season ===
Note: Flags indicate national team as defined under FIFA eligibility rules; some limited exceptions apply. Players may hold more than one non-FIFA nationality.

No.	Pos.	Nation	Player
4	MF	ENG	Sean Davis (to Portsmouth)
8	MF	POR	Pedro Mendes (to Portsmouth)
9	FW	MLI	Frédéric Kanouté (to Sevilla)
11	MF	ENG	Michael Brown (to Fulham)
13	GK	HUN	Márton Fülöp (on loan to Coventry City)
14	DF	SWE	Erik Edman (to Rennes)
16	DF	SUI	Reto Ziegler (on loan to Wigan Athletic)

No.	Pos.	Nation	Player
17	DF	FRA	Noé Pamarot (to Portsmouth)
21	MF	ENG	Wayne Routledge (on loan to Portsmouth)
29	DF	ENG	Philip Ifil (on loan to Millwall)
36	FW	MAR	Mounir El Hamdaoui (on loan to Derby County)
—	MF	ISL	Emil Hallfreðsson (on loan to Malmö)
—	DF	BRA	Rodrigo Defendi (on loan to Udinese)

=== Reserve squad ===
Note: Flags indicate national team as defined under FIFA eligibility rules; some limited exceptions apply. Players may hold more than one non-FIFA nationality.

No.	Pos.	Nation	Player
14	MF	EGY	Hossam Ghaly
24	DF	SCG	Goran Bunjevčević
31	MF	ENG	Dean Marney
35	GK	ENG	Robert Burch
—	FW	ENG	Andy Barcham
—	DF	ENG	Charlie Daniels
—	FW	ENG	Simon Dawkins

No.	Pos.	Nation	Player
—	MF	ENG	Charlie Lee
—	MF	ENG	Stuart Lewis
—	MF	COD	Jacques Maghoma
—	DF	ENG	Marcel McKie
—	DF	ENG	Leigh Mills
—	MF	ENG	Jamie O'Hara

== Transfers ==
=== In ===
- (England) Tom Huddlestone – (England) Derby County, undisclosed (est. £2,500,000)
- (Canada) Paul Stalteri – (Germany) Werder Bremen, 16 May, undisclosed
- (England) Aaron Lennon – (England) Leeds United, 15 June, £1,000,000
- (Finland) Teemu Tainio – (France) Auxerre, 1 July, free
- (England) Wayne Routledge – (England) Crystal Palace, 1 July, £1,250,000 (rising to £2,000,000)
- (Netherlands) Edgar Davids – (Italy) Inter Milan, 3 August, free
- (South Korea) Lee Young-Pyo – (Netherlands) PSV, £1,350,000, 31 August
- (England) Jermaine Jenas – (England) Newcastle United, 31 August, £7,000,000
- (Poland) Grzegorz Rasiak – (England) Derby County, 31 August, undisclosed
- (Egypt) Hossam Ghaly – (Netherlands) Feyenoord, 31 January, undisclosed
- (England) Danny Murphy – (England) Charlton Athletic, 31 January, £2,000,000

=== Out ===
- (Mali) Frédéric Kanouté - (Spain) Sevilla, 18 August, £5,100,000
- (Sweden) Erik Edman - (France) Rennes, 3 August, undisclosed
- (England) Sean Davis - (England) Portsmouth, 12 January, £3,000,000
- (France) Noé Pamarot - (England) Portsmouth, 12 January, £1,000,000
- (Portugal) Pedro Mendes – (England) Portsmouth, 12 January, £3,500,000
- (England) Michael Brown – (England) Fulham, 31 January, undisclosed
- (Iceland) Emil Hallfreðsson - (Sweden) Malmö, loan
- (Brazil) Rodrigo Defendi - (Italy) Udinese, loan

Transfers in: ▼£15,100,000
Transfers out: ▲£12,575,000
Total spending: ▼£2,525,000

=== Loans out ===
- (England) Philip Ifil - (England) Millwall, 13 September, three-month loan
- (Morocco) Mounir El Hamdaoui - (England) Derby County, 16 September, three-month loan
- (England) Johnnie Jackson - (England) Derby County, 16 September, three-month loan
- (Hungary) Márton Fülöp - (England) Coventry City, 28 October, three-month loan
- (England) Philip Ifil - (England) Millwall, 20 January, season-long loan
- (Switzerland) Reto Ziegler – (England) Wigan Athletic, 23 January, season-long loan
- (England) Wayne Routledge – (England) Portsmouth, 30 January, season-long loan

== Competitions Overview ==
Competition	Record						
Competition	P	W	D	L	GF	GA	Win %
Premier League	38	18	11	9	53	38	47.37
FA Cup	1	0	0	1	2	3	0.00
League Cup	1	0	0	1	0	1	0.00
Total	40	18	11	11	55	42	45.00

== Results ==
=== Premier League ===
==== Results per matchday ====
Matchday	1	2	3	4	5	6	7	8	9	10	11	12	13	14	15	16	17	18	19	20	21	22	23	24	25	26	27	28	29	30	31	32	33	34	35	36	37	38
Ground	A	H	A	H	H	A	H	A	H	A	H	A	H	A	H	H	A	H	A	H	A	A	H	A	H	A	H	H	A	A	H	A	H	A	H	A	H	A
Result	W	W	D	L	D	D	W	W	W	D	D	L	D	W	W	W	D	W	L	W	W	L	D	L	W	D	D	W	L	W	W	L	W	W	L	D	W	L
Position	4	1	2	4	5	6	4	3	2	3	3	6	6	5	4	4	4	4	4	4	4	4	4	4	4	4	4	4	4	4	4	4	4	4	4	4	4	5

A = Away; H = Home; W = Win; D = Draw; L = Loss

13 August 2005 1	Portsmouth	0–2	Tottenham Hotspur	Portsmouth, Hampshire
		Report	Griffin 45' (o.g.); Defoe 64'	Stadium: Fratton Park; Attendance: 20,215; Referee: Barry Knight

20 August 2005 2	Tottenham Hotspur	2–0	Middlesbrough	Haringey, London
	Defoe 49'; Mido 75'	Report		Stadium: White Hart Lane; Attendance: 35,844; Referee: Martin Atkinson

24 August 2005 3	Blackburn Rovers	0–0	Tottenham Hotspur	Blackburn, Lancashire
		Report	Neill (red card) 75'	Stadium: Ewood Park; Attendance: 22,375; Referee: Dermot Gallagher

27 August 2005 4	Tottenham Hotspur	0–2	Chelsea	Haringey, London
	Mido (red card) 25'	Report	Del Horno 39'; Duff 71'	Stadium: White Hart Lane; Attendance: 36,077; Referee: Rob Styles

10 September 2005 5	Tottenham Hotspur	0–0	Liverpool	Haringey, London
		Report		Stadium: White Hart Lane; Attendance: 36,148; Referee: Howard Webb

17 September 2005 6	Aston Villa	1–1	Tottenham Hotspur	Birmingham, West Midlands
	Milner 4'	Report	Keane 78'	Stadium: Villa Park; Attendance: 33,686; Referee: Steve Bennett

26 September 2005 7	Tottenham Hotspur	1–0	Fulham	Haringey, London
	Defoe 8'	Report		Stadium: White Hart Lane; Attendance: 35,427; Referee: Alan Wiley

1 October 2005 8	Charlton Athletic	2–3	Tottenham Hotspur	Greenwich, London
	Bent 25', 48'	Report	King 51'; Mido 64'; Keane 80'	Stadium: The Valley; Attendance: 27,111; Referee: Phil Dowd

15 October 2005 9	Tottenham Hotspur	2–0	Everton	Haringey, London
	Mido 58'; Jenas 63'	Report		Stadium: White Hart Lane; Attendance: 36,247; Referee: Dermot Gallagher

22 October 2005 10	Manchester United	1–1	Tottenham Hotspur	Trafford, Greater Manchester
	Silvestre 7'	Report	Jenas 72'	Stadium: Old Trafford; Attendance: 67,856; Referee: Uriah Rennie

29 October 2005 11	Tottenham Hotspur	1–1	Arsenal	Haringey, London
	King 17'	Report	Pires 77'	Stadium: White Hart Lane; Attendance: 36,154; Referee: Steve Bennett

8 November 2005 12	Bolton Wanderers	1–0	Tottenham Hotspur	Bolton, Greater Manchester
	Nolan 32'	Report		Stadium: Reebok Stadium; Attendance: 26,634; Referee: Howard Webb

20 November 2005 13	Tottenham Hotspur	1–1	West Ham United	Haringey, London
	Mido 16'	Report	Ferdinand 90'	Stadium: White Hart Lane; Attendance: 36,154; Referee: Alan Wiley

26 November 2005 14	Wigan Athletic	1–2	Tottenham Hotspur	Wigan, Greater Manchester
	McCulloch 88'	Report	Keane 8'; Davids 77'	Stadium: JJB Stadium; Attendance: 22,611; Referee: Mike Riley

3 December 2005 15	Tottenham Hotspur	3–2	Sunderland	Haringey, London
	Mido 37'; Keane 51'; Carrick 77'	Report	Whitehead 16'; Le Tallec 60'	Stadium: White Hart Lane; Attendance: 36,244; Referee: Peter Walton

12 December 2005 16	Tottenham Hotspur	3–1	Portsmouth	Haringey, London
	King 57'; Mido 85' (pen.); Defoe 90'	Report	LuaLua 24'	Stadium: White Hart Lane; Attendance: 36,141; Referee: Uriah Rennie

18 December 2005 17	Middlesbrough	3–3	Tottenham Hotspur	Middlesbrough, North Yorkshire
	Yakubu 30', 43'; Queudrue 69'	Report	Keane 25'; Jenas 63'; Mido 83'	Stadium: Riverside Stadium; Attendance: 27,614; Referee: Howard Webb

26 December 2005 18	Tottenham Hotspur	2–0	Birmingham City	Haringey, London
	Keane 58' (pen.); Defoe 90'	Report	Muzzy Izzet (red card) 65'	Stadium: White Hart Lane; Attendance: 36,045; Referee: Phil Dowd

28 December 2005 19	West Bromwich Albion	2–0	Tottenham Hotspur	West Bromwich, West Midlands
	Kanu 23', 52'	Report		Stadium: The Hawthorns; Attendance: 27,510; Referee: Mike Riley

31 December 2005 20	Tottenham Hotspur	2–0	Newcastle United	Haringey, London
	Tainio 43'; Mido 66'	Report		Stadium: White Hart Lane; Attendance: 36,246; Referee: Howard Webb

4 January 2006 21	Manchester City	0–2	Tottenham Hotspur	Manchester
		Report	Mido 31'; Keane 83'	Stadium: City of Manchester Stadium; Attendance: 40,808; Referee: Alan Wiley

14 January 2006 22	Liverpool	1–0	Tottenham Hotspur	Liverpool, Merseyside
	Kewell 59'	Report	Stalteri (red card) 87'	Stadium: Anfield; Attendance: 44,983; Referee: Dermot Gallagher

21 January 2006 23	Tottenham Hotspur	0–0	Aston Villa	Haringey, London
		Report	Gareth Barry (red card) 83'	Stadium: White Hart Lane; Attendance: 36,243; Referee: Graham Poll

31 January 2006 24	Fulham	1–0	Tottenham Hotspur	Fulham, London
	Bocanegra 90'	Report	Dawson (red card) 72'	Stadium: Craven Cottage; Attendance: 21,081; Referee: Howard Webb

5 February 2006 25	Tottenham Hotspur	3–1	Charlton Athletic	Haringey, London
	Jermain Defoe 14', 46'; Jenas 41'	Report	Thomas 70'	Stadium: White Hart Lane; Attendance: 36,034; Referee: Phil Dowd

12 February 2006 26	Sunderland	1–1	Tottenham Hotspur	Sunderland, Tyne and Wear
	Murphy 89'	Report	Keane 38'	Stadium: Stadium of Light

19 February 2006 27	Tottenham Hotspur	2–2	Wigan Athletic	Haringey, London
	Mido 23'; Defoe 68'	Report	Johansson 10', 67'	Stadium: White Hart Lane; Attendance: 35,676; Referee: Uriah Rennie

5 March 2006 28	Tottenham Hotspur	3–2	Blackburn Rovers	Haringey, London
	Keane 9', 42'; Mido 70'	Report	Sinama-Pongolle 44'; Bellamy 67'	Stadium: White Hart Lane; Attendance: 36,080; Referee: Howard Webb

11 March 2006 29	Chelsea	2–1	Tottenham Hotspur	Fulham, London
	Essien 11'; Gallas 90'	Report	Jenas 45'	Stadium: Stamford Bridge; Attendance: 42,243; Referee: Graham Poll

18 March 2006 30	Birmingham City	0–2	Tottenham Hotspur	Birmingham, West Midlands
		Report	Lennon 65'; Keane 77'	Stadium: St. Andrew's; Attendance: 26,398; Referee: Uriah Rennie

27 March 2006 31	Tottenham Hotspur	2–1	West Bromwich Albion	Haringey, London
	Keane 68', 89' (pen.)	Report	Davies 21'	Stadium: White Hart Lane; Attendance: 36,152; Referee: Chris Foy

1 April 2006 32	Newcastle United	3–1	Tottenham Hotspur	Newcastle upon Tyne, Tyneside
15:00	Bowyer 2'; Ameobi 25'; Shearer 30' (pen.)	Report	Keane 19'; Dawson (yellow card) 61' (red card)	Stadium: St James' Park; Attendance: 52,185; Referee: Mike Dean

8 April 2006 33	Tottenham Hotspur	2–1	Manchester City	Haringey, London
12:45	Stalteri 44'; Carrick 49'	Report	Samaras 52'	Stadium: White Hart Lane; Attendance: 36,167; Referee: Dermot Gallagher

15 April 2006 34	Everton	0–1	Tottenham Hotspur	Liverpool, Merseyside
		Report	Keane 33' (pen.)	Stadium: Goodison Park; Attendance: 39,856; Referee: Howard Webb

17 April 2006 35	Tottenham Hotspur	1–2	Manchester United	Haringey, London
	Jenas 53'	Report	Rooney 8', 36'	Stadium: White Hart Lane; Attendance: 36,141; Referee: Mark Halsey

22 April 2006 36	Arsenal	1–1	Tottenham Hotspur	Islington, London
	Henry 84'	Report	Keane 66'; Davids (red card) 85'	Stadium: Highbury; Attendance: 38,326; Referee: Steve Bennett

30 April 2006 37	Tottenham Hotspur	1–0	Bolton Wanderers	Haringey, London
	Lennon 60'	Report		Stadium: White Hart Lane; Attendance: 36,179; Referee: Alan Wiley

7 May 2006 38	West Ham United	2–1	Tottenham Hotspur	Newham, London
	Fletcher 10'; Benayoun 80'	Report	Defoe 35'	Stadium: Boleyn Ground; Attendance: 34,970; Referee: Chris Foy

=== FA Cup ===
8 January 2006 3rd round	Leicester City	3-2	Tottenham Hotspur	Leicester
	Hammond 44'; Hughes 57' de Vries 90'	Report	Jenas 20'; Stalteri 41'	Stadium: Walkers Stadium; Attendance: 19,844; Referee: Steve Bennett

=== League Cup ===
20 September 2005 2nd round	Grimsby Town	1-0	Tottenham Hotspur	Grimsby
	Kalala 89'	Report		Stadium: Blundell Park; Attendance: 8,206; Referee: Graham Laws

== Final league table ==
Pos	Team	Pld	W	D	L	GF	GA	GD	Pts	Qualification or relegation
3	Liverpool	38	25	7	6	57	25	+32	82	Qualification for the Champions League third qualifying round
4	Arsenal	38	20	7	11	68	31	+37	67	Qualification for the Champions League third qualifying round
5	Tottenham Hotspur	38	18	11	9	53	38	+15	65	Qualification for the UEFA Cup first round (Note: Since Manchester United qualified for the Champions League, their place in the UEFA Cup as League Cup winners passed down to the league and was awarded to Blackburn Rovers as the highest-placed team not already qualified for European competitions.)
6	Blackburn Rovers	38	19	6	13	51	42	+9	63	Qualification for the UEFA Cup first round
7	Newcastle United	38	17	7	14	47	42	+5	58	Qualification for the Intertoto Cup third round

Source: Barclays Premier League
Rules for classification: 1) points; 2) goal difference; 3) number of goals scored.

== Statistics ==
=== Appearances and goals ===
Last updated: 26 July 2020.
Source: premierleague.com

No.	Pos	Nat	Player	Total		Premier League		FA Cup		League Cup	
No.	Pos	Nat	Player	Apps	Goals	Apps	Goals	Apps	Goals	Apps	Goals
Goalkeepers
1	GK	(England) ENG	Paul Robinson	40	0	38	0	1	0	1	0
Defenders
2	DF	(Morocco) MAR	Noureddine Naybet	4	0	2+1	0	0	0	1	0
3	DF	(Republic of Ireland) IRL	Stephen Kelly	10	0	9	0	1	0	0	0
7	DF	(Canada) CAN	Paul Stalteri	35	2	33	1	1	1	1	0
16	DF	(South Korea) KOR	Lee Young-Pyo	31	0	31	0	0	0	0	0
20	DF	(England) ENG	Michael Dawson	33	0	31+1	0	1	0	0	0
26	DF	(England) ENG	Ledley King	27	3	26	3	0	0	1	0
27	DF	(England) ENG	Calum Davenport	4	0	1+3	0	0	0	0	0
30	DF	(England) ENG	Anthony Gardner	18	0	16+1	0	1	0	0	0
Midfielders
5	MF	(Netherlands) NED	Edgar Davids	31	1	28+3	1	0	0	0	0
6	MF	(Finland) FIN	Teemu Tainio	25	1	22+2	1	0+1	0	0	0
8	MF	(England) ENG	Danny Murphy	10	0	2+8	0	0	0	0	0
19	MF	(Republic of Ireland) IRL	Andy Reid	14	0	7+6	0	0	0	1	0
22	MF	(England) ENG	Tom Huddlestone	4	0	0+4	0	0	0	0	0
23	MF	(England) ENG	Michael Carrick	37	2	35	2	1	0	1	0
25	MF	(England) ENG	Aaron Lennon	29	2	21+6	2	1	0	0+1	0
28	MF	(England) ENG	Jermaine Jenas	32	7	30	6	1	1	1	0
32	MF	(England) ENG	Johnnie Jackson	1	0	0+1	0	0	0	0	0
Forwards
9	FW	(Poland) POL	Grzegorz Rasiak	9	0	4+4	0	1	0	0	0
10	FW	(Republic of Ireland) IRL	Robbie Keane	38	16	25+11	16	1	0	1	0
15	FW	(Egypt) EGY	Mido	27	11	24+3	11	0	0	0	0
18	FW	(England) ENG	Jermain Defoe	38	9	23+13	9	0+1	0	1	0
37	FW	(England) ENG	Lee Barnard	3	0	0+3	0	0	0	0	0
Players transferred out during the season
4	MF	(England) ENG	Sean Davis	1	0	0	0	0	0	0+1	0
8	MF	(Portugal) POR	Pedro Mendes	6	0	3+3	0	0	0	0	0
9	FW	(Mali) MLI	Frédéric Kanouté	1	0	0+1	0	0	0	0	0
11	MF	(England) ENG	Michael Brown	11	0	2+7	0	1	0	1	0
14	DF	(Sweden) SWE	Erik Edman	3	0	3	0	0	0	0	0
17	DF	(France) FRA	Noé Pamarot	2	0	0+2	0	0	0	0	0
21	MF	(England) ENG	Wayne Routledge	3	0	2+1	0	0	0	0	0

=== Goal scorers ===
Last updated: 26 July 2020.
Source: premierleague.com

The list is sorted by shirt number when total goals are equal.

Rnk	Pos	No.	Player	Premier League	FA Cup	EFL Cup	Total
1	FW	10	(Republic of Ireland) Robbie Keane	16	0	0	16
2	FW	15	(Egypt) Mido	11	0	0	11
3	FW	18	(England) Jermain Defoe	9	0	0	9
4	MF	28	(England) Jermaine Jenas	6	1	0	7
5	DF	26	(England) Ledley King	3	0	0	3
6	DF	7	(Canada) Paul Stalteri	1	1	0	2
6	MF	23	(England) Michael Carrick	2	0	0	2
6	MF	25	(England) Aaron Lennon	2	0	0	2
9	MF	5	(Netherlands) Edgar Davids	1	0	0	1
9	MF	6	(Finland) Teemu Tainio	1	0	0	1
TOTALS				52	2	0	54

=== Clean sheets ===
Last updated: 26 July 2020.
Source: premierleague.com

Rnk	No.	Player	Premier League	FA Cup	EFL Cup	Total
1	1	(England) Paul Robinson	13	0	0	13
TOTALS			13	0	0	13
