= 2007–08 Colchester United F.C. season =

Colchester United
2007–08 season
- Owner: Robbie Cowling
- Chairman: Robbie Cowling
- Manager: Geraint Williams
- Stadium: Layer Road
- Championship: 24th (relegated)
- FA Cup: 3rd round (eliminated by Peterborough United)
- League Cup: 1st round (eliminated by Shrewsbury Town)
- Top goalscorer: League: Kevin Lisbie (17); All: Kevin Lisbie (17)
- Highest home attendance: 6,300 v Stoke City, 26 April 2008
- Lowest home attendance: 4,003 v Peterborough United, 5 January 2008
- Average home league attendance: 5,446
- Biggest win: 3–0 v Preston North End, 25 August 2007
- Biggest defeat: 1–5 v Norwich City, 22 March 2008 v Coventry City, 19 April 2008
Home colours

The 2007–08 season was Colchester United's 66th season in their history and their second successive season in the second tier of English football, the Championship. Alongside competing in the Championship, the club also participated in the FA Cup and League Cup.

Colchester struggled during their second season in the Championship, suffering long spells without wins. The early stages of the season were promising, with the U's featuring in mid-table, but a drop in form leading into December saw them enter the relegation zone from which they would never emerge. They earned just seven wins and were relegated in 24th and last place. They never recovered from selling their midfield and defensive assets, despite owner and now chairman Robbie Cowling freeing up funds for manager Geraint Williams in January.

It was a farewell season to the club's aging Layer Road ground as they were to move to the purpose-built Colchester Community Stadium in the summer of 2008.

The U's suffered an early exit from the cup competitions to League Two opposition. Shrewsbury Town knocked Colchester out of the League Cup while Peterborough United beat them 3–1 at Layer Road in the FA Cup.

== Season overview ==
Ahead of Colchester's largely unexpected second season in the Championship, their star performers Wayne Brown, Jamie Cureton, Richard Garcia, and Chris Iwelumo all left the club citing a "lack of ambition" as their reason for wanting to leave. Cureton left for Norwich City for £750,000, prompting manager Geraint Williams to break the club's record transfer fee twice on the same day by signing Mark Yeates from Tottenham Hotspur and then spending £300,000 on Milton Keynes Dons' forward Clive Platt. The following day, England legend Teddy Sheringham also signed for the club.

Over the summer, Robbie Cowling took over as chairman from Peter Heard, who stepped down after 16 years to become Life President. Cowling instigated a major change at the club by reverting Heard's previous attitude towards not using agents, admitting that if Colchester were to compete then they would have to use agents.

Once a fortress in their first season in the Championship, Layer Road faced its final season hosting Colchester United. Unfortunately, Colchester could muster only four home wins across the season, with their final Layer Road win a 2–0 victory over neighbours Ipswich Town. One of the reasons for the U's struggling was the lack of replacement for Wayne Brown in the centre of defence. While they kept up a good scoring record through Platt and fellow new signing Kevin Lisbie, the defence leaked goals, conceding 86 in the league. Despite early season promise with the U's hovering around mid-table, by Christmas it was apparent they were in a relegation battle.

In the January transfer window, Cowling made funds available to Geraint Williams. He brought in Chris Coyne from Luton Town for another club record fee of £350,000, while Dean Hammond and Philip Ifil were also brought in for six-figure fees. There was a brief turnaround in form in January and early February, but a ten game run without a win including five consecutive defeats left the writing on the wall for the U's.

Colchester could have been relegated from the Championship on 5 April, but the 2–0 win over rivals Ipswich ensured that the U's neighbours would not be the team relegating them. However, the inevitable occurred four days later when, without playing, relegation was confirmed when results went against them. In addition to conceding 86 goals, they kept a clean sheet on just two occasions all season.

On 26 April, Layer Road hosted its final competitive game, just over 70 years since its first. With the move to the Colchester Community Stadium looming in the summer, Colchester played their final home game against Premier League-bound Stoke City, who were 1–0 victors on the day. In spite of the relegation and lowly league position, it was still Colchester's second-best-ever league performance.

== Players ==
As of match played 4 May 2008.

No.	Name	Position	Nationality	Place of birth	Date of birth	Apps	Goals	Signed from	Date signed	Fee
Goalkeepers
1	Dean Gerken	GK	(England)	Southend-on-Sea	22 May 1985 (aged 22)	60	0	Youth team	1 August 2002	Free transfer
13	Aidan Davison	GK	(Northern Ireland)	(England) Sedgefield	11 May 1968 (aged 39)	103	0	(England) Grimsby Town	5 July 2004	Free transfer
23	Mark Cousins	GK	(England)	Chelmsford	9 January 1987 (aged 20)	0	0	Youth team	1 August 2004	Free transfer
31	Ademola Bankole	GK	(Nigeria)	Lagos	9 September 1969 (aged 37)	0	0	(England) Milton Keyes Dons	29 February 2008	Undisclosed
Defenders
2	Danny Granville	FB	(England)	Islington	19 January 1975 (aged 32)	0	0	(England) Crystal Palace	9 July 2007	Free transfer
3	John White	FB	(England)	Colchester	26 July 1986 (aged 20)	82	0	Youth team	1 July 2003	Free transfer
5	Chris Coyne	CB	(Australia)	Brisbane	20 December 1978 (aged 28)	0	0	(England) Luton Town	10 January 2008	£350,000
12	Pat Baldwin	CB	(England)	City of London	12 November 1982 (aged 24)	149	1	(England) Chelsea	16 August 2002	Free transfer
18	Philip Ifil	RB	(England)	Willesden	18 January 1986 (aged 21)	0	0	(England) Tottenham Hotspur	10 January 2008	Undisclosed
25	James Hammond	DF	(England)	Newham	11 November 1989 (aged 17)	0	0	Youth team	1 July 2007	Free transfer
28	Tom Devaux	DF	(England)			0	0	Youth team	1 July 2007	Free transfer
Midfielders
4	Johnnie Jackson	MF	(England)	Camden Town	15 August 1982 (aged 24)	41	2	(England) Tottenham Hotspur	20 June 2006	Free transfer
6	Kevin Watson	MF	(England)	Hackney	3 January 1974 (aged 33)	147	4	(England) Reading	5 July 2004	Free transfer
7	Karl Duguid	MF	(England)	Letchworth	21 March 1978 (aged 29)	398	45	Youth team	9 December 1995 (Note: Date of signing refers to the date of the player's first game for the club)	Free transfer
10	Kemal Izzet	MF	(England)	Whitechapel	29 September 1980 (aged 26)	247	19	(England) Charlton Athletic	13 April 2001	Free transfer
17	Luke Guttridge	MF	(England)	Barnstaple	27 March 1982 (aged 25)	0	0	(England) Leyton Orient	5 July 2007	Free transfer
22	Dean Hammond	MF	(England)	Hastings	7 March 1983 (aged 24)	0	0	(England) Brighton & Hove Albion	31 January 2008	£250,000
27	Anthony Wordsworth	MF	(England)	Camden Town	3 January 1989 (aged 18)	0	0	Youth team	1 July 2006	Free transfer
Forwards
8	Teddy Sheringham	FW	(England)	Highams Park	2 April 1966 (aged 41)	0	0	(England) West Ham United	4 July 2007	Free transfer
9	Clive Platt	FW	(England)	Wolverhampton	27 October 1977 (aged 29)	0	0	(England) Milton Keynes Dons	3 July 2007	£300,000
11	Mark Yeates	WG	(Republic of Ireland)	Dublin	11 January 1985 (aged 22)	52	6	(England) Tottenham Hotspur	3 July 2007	Undisclosed
14	Kevin McLeod	WG	(England)	Liverpool	12 September 1980 (aged 26)	25	3	(Wales) Swansea City	30 August 2008	Free transfer
15	Jamie Guy	FW	(England)	Barking	1 August 1987 (aged 19)	42	3	Youth team	1 July 2004	Free transfer
20	Kevin Lisbie	FW	(Jamaica)	(England) Hackney	17 October 1978 (aged 28)	0	0	(England) Charlton Athletic	3 August 2007	Free transfer
24	Scott Vernon	FW	(England)	Manchester	13 December 1983 (aged 23)	7	1	(England) Blackpool	31 January 2008	Undisclosed
26	Fabian Quintyn	FW	(England)	London	16 November 1989 (aged 17)	0	0	Youth team	1 July 2007	Free transfer
29	Tom Webb	FW	(England)	Chelmsford	17 April 1989 (aged 18)	0	0	Youth team	4 July 2007	Free transfer
30	Medy Elito	WG	(England)	(Zaire) Kinshasa	20 March 1990 (aged 17)	0	0	Youth team	1 July 2007	Free transfer

== Transfers ==
=== In ===
Date	Position	Nationality	Name	From	Fee	Ref.
1 July 2007	FW	(England)	Tom Devaux	Youth team	Free transfer	
1 July 2007	DF	(England)	James Hammond	Youth team	Free transfer	
1 July 2007	FW	(England)	Fabian Quintyn	Youth team	Free transfer	
3 July 2007	WG	(Republic of Ireland)	Mark Yeates	(England) Tottenham Hotspur	Undisclosed	
3 July 2007	FW	(England)	Clive Platt	(England) Milton Keynes Dons	£300,000	
4 July 2007	FW	(England)	Teddy Sheringham	(England) West Ham United	Free transfer	
4 July 2007	FW	(England)	Tom Webb	Youth team	Free transfer	
5 July 2007	MF	(England)	Luke Guttridge	(England) Leyton Orient	Free transfer	
9 July 2007	WG	(England)	Medy Elito	Youth team	Free transfer	
9 July 2007	FB	(England)	Danny Granville	(England) Crystal Palace	Free transfer	
3 August 2008	FW	(Jamaica)	Kevin Lisbie	(England) Charlton Athletic	Free transfer	
10 January 2008	CB	(Australia)	Chris Coyne	(England) Luton Town	£350,000	
10 January 2008	RB	(England)	Philip Ifil	(England) Tottenham Hotspur	Undisclosed	
31 January 2008	MF	(England)	Dean Hammond	(England) Brighton & Hove Albion	£250,000	
31 January 2008	FW	(England)	Scott Vernon	(England) Blackpool	Undisclosed	
29 February 2008	FW	(Nigeria)	Ademola Bankole	(England) Milton Keynes Dons	Undisclosed	

- Total spending: ▼ ~ £900,000

=== Out ===
Date	Position	Nationality	Name	To	Fee	Ref.
21 May 2007	FW	(Scotland)	Chris Iwelumo	(England) Charlton Athletic	Free transfer	
31 May 2007	MF	(England)	Robbie King	(England) Heybridge Swifts	Released	
29 June 2007	FW	(England)	Jamie Cureton	(England) Norwich City	£750,000	
30 June 2007	FW	(England)	Craig Hughes	(England) Heybridge Swifts	Undisclosed	
30 June 2007	FW	(Scotland)	Marino Keith	(Scotland) Peterhead	Free transfer	
30 June 2007	DF	(England)	Matthew Paine	(England) Thurrock	Undisclosed	
30 June 2007	FB	(England)	Lawrie Wilson	(England) Stevenage Borough	Released	
2 July 2007	MF	(Australia)	Richard Garcia	(England) Hull City	Free transfer	
13 July 2007	CB	(England)	Wayne Brown	(England) Hull City	£450,000	
4 August 2007	CB	(England)	Garry Richards	(England) Southend United	£50,000	
30 January 2008	FB/CB	(Cameroon)	George Elokobi	(England) Wolverhampton Wanderers	£500,000	

- Total incoming: ▲ ~ £1,750,000

=== Loans in ===
Date	Position	Nationality	Name	From	End date	Ref.
20 July 2007	CB	(England)	Matthew Connolly	(England) Arsenal	16 December 2007	
2 August 2007	DF	(Hungary)	Béla Balogh	(Hungary) MTK Budapest	31 May 2007	
15 August 2007	DF/FW	(Scotland)	Adam Virgo	(Scotland) Celtic	27 April 2008	
29 February 2008	FW	(England)	Izale McLeod	(England) Charlton Athletic	31 March 2008	
14 March 2008	CB	(England)	Matt Heath	(England) Leeds United	12 May 2008	

=== Loans out ===
Date	Position	Nationality	Name	To	End date	Ref.
22 November 2007	FB	(England)	John White	(England) Stevenage Borough	30 December 2007	
28 February 2008	FW	(England)	Tom Webb	(England) Folkestone Invicta	28 March 2008	

== Match details ==
=== Championship ===
==== League table ====
Pos	Team	Pld	W	D	L	GF	GA	GD	Pts	Promotion, qualification or relegation
20	Southampton	46	13	15	18	56	72	−16	54	
21	Coventry City	46	14	11	21	52	64	−12	53	
22	Leicester City (R)	46	12	16	18	42	45	−3	52	Relegation to Football League One
23	Scunthorpe United (R)	46	11	13	22	46	69	−23	46	Relegation to Football League One
24	Colchester United (R)	46	7	17	22	62	86	−24	38	Relegation to Football League One

Updated to match(es) played on 4 May 2008. Source: The Football League
Rules for classification: 1) points; 2) goal difference; 3) number of goals scored.
(R) Relegated

==== Results round by round ====
Round	1	2	3	4	5	6	7	8	9	10	11	12	13	14	15	16	17	18	19	20	21	22	23	24	25	26	27	28	29	30	31	32	33	34	35	36	37	38	39	40	41	42	43	44	45	46
Ground	A	H	A	H	H	A	A	H	H	A	H	A	A	H	H	A	H	A	A	H	A	H	A	H	H	A	A	A	H	A	H	A	H	H	A	A	H	H	H	A	A	H	A	H	H	A
Result	D	D	W	L	D	D	D	L	W	L	W	L	L	D	D	D	L	L	W	L	L	D	L	D	L	W	D	L	D	D	W	D	L	L	L	L	L	D	L	L	L	W	D	L	L	D
Position	10	13	5	13	16	14	14	18	12	17	12	15	16	16	17	18	18	20	19	19	22	22	24	24	24	23	24	24	24	24	23	22	23	24	24	24	24	24	24	24	24	24	24	24	24	24

Source: Statto.com (archived)
A = Away; H = Home; W = Win; D = Draw; L = Loss

==== Matches ====
11 August 2007 1	Sheffield United	2–2	Colchester United	Sheffield
15:00 BST	Beattie 68'; Tonge 82'	Report	K. McLeod 68'; Platt 89'	Stadium: Bramall Lane; Attendance: 26,202; Referee: Mike Jones

18 August 2007 2	Colchester United	2–2	Barnsley	Colchester
	Sheringham 45'; Connolly 48'; Gerken (red card) 26'	Report	Howard 28' (pen.), 85' (pen.); Reid (red card) 51'	Stadium: Layer Road; Attendance: 4,450; Referee: Andy Hall

25 August 2007 3	Preston North End	0–3	Colchester United	Preston
		Report	Lisbie 41'; Sheringham 61' (pen.); Yeates 72'	Stadium: Deepdale; Attendance: 11,582; Referee: Steve Tanner

1 September 2007 4	Colchester United	2–3	Burnley	Colchester
	Lisbie 45'; Virgo 88'	Report	Mahon 15'; Gray 29', 63' (pen.)	Stadium: Layer Road; Attendance: 4,925; Referee: Phil Joslin

15 September 2007 5	Colchester United	2–2	Charlton Athletic	Colchester
	Yeates 32'; Lisbie 38'; Connolly (red card) 55'	Report	Todorov 45'; Zhi 73'	Stadium: Layer Road; Attendance: 5,860; Referee: Mick Russell

19 September 2007 6	Southampton	1–1	Colchester United	Southampton
	Wright-Phillips 52'	Report	Skácel 58' (o.g.)	Stadium: St Mary's Stadium; Attendance: 18,773; Referee: Andy D'Urso

22 September 2007 7	Blackpool	2–2	Colchester United	Blackpool
	Morrell 54'; Barker 84'	Report	Yeates 63', 86'	Stadium: Bloomfield Road; Attendance: 7,959; Referee: Scott Mathieson

29 September 2007 8	Colchester United	0–1	Scunthorpe United	Colchester
		Report	Hayes 41'	Stadium: Layer Road; Attendance: 5,218; Referee: Andy Woolmer

3 October 2007 9	Colchester United	4–2	Queens Park Rangers	Colchester
	Leigertwood 19' (o.g.); Izzet 30'; Yeates 38'; Platt 63'	Report	Ephraim 29'; Vine 58'	Stadium: Layer Road; Attendance: 5,361; Referee: Jonathan Moss

6 October 2007 10	Stoke City	2–1	Colchester United	Stoke-on-Trent
	Shawcross 8'; Lawrence 73'	Report	Platt 58'	Stadium: Britannia Stadium; Attendance: 12,395; Referee: Clive Penton

20 October 2007 11	Colchester United	3–2	West Bromwich Albion	Colchester
	Yeates 8', 68' (pen.); Lisbie 19'	Report	Phillips 6'; Miller 39'	Stadium: Layer Road; Attendance: 5,798; Referee: Kevin Friend

23 October 2007 12	Ipswich Town	3–1	Colchester United	Ipswich
19:45 BST	Walters 71'; Trotter 81'; Haynes 84'	Report	Platt 31'	Stadium: Portman Road; Attendance: 25,727; Referee: Keith Stroud

27 October 2007 13	Coventry City	1–0	Colchester United	Coventry
	Mifsud 81'	Report	Sheringham (red card) 90'	Stadium: Ricoh Arena; Attendance: 23,431; Referee: R Lee

3 November 2007 14	Colchester United	1–1	Leicester City	Colchester
	Jackson 45'	Report	John 7'	Stadium: Layer Road; Attendance: 5,661; Referee: Andy Penn

6 November 2007 15	Colchester United	1–1	Plymouth Argyle	Colchester
	Lisbie 56'	Report	Norris 88'	Stadium: Layer Road; Attendance: 4,833; Referee: Grant Hegley

10 November 2007 16	Watford	2–2	Colchester United	Watford
15:00 GMT	Johnson 4'; King 64'	Report	Platt 20'; Lisbie 46'	Stadium: Vicarage Road; Attendance: 16,069; Referee: Neil Swarbrick

24 November 2007 17	Colchester United	1–2	Crystal Palace	Colchester
	Jackson 69'; Baldwin (red card) 8'	Report	Morrison 6', 74'	Stadium: Layer Road; Attendance: 5,856; Referee: Paul Taylor

28 November 2007 18	Wolverhampton Wanderers	1–0	Colchester United	Wolverhampton
	Elliott 32'	Report		Stadium: Molineux Stadium; Attendance: 20,966; Referee: Eddie Ilderton

1 December 2007 19	Sheffield Wednesday	1–2	Colchester United	Sheffield
	Sodje 36'	Report	Sheringham 1'; Elokobi 26'	Stadium: Hillsborough Stadium; Attendance: 22,331; Referee: Anthony Bates

4 December 2007 20	Colchester United	2–3	Watford	Colchester
	Platt 7'; Connolly 28'	Report	King 40'; O'Toole 42'; Priskin 64'	Stadium: Layer Road; Attendance: 5,760; Referee: Trevor Kettle

8 December 2007 21	Cardiff City	4–1	Colchester United	Cardiff
	Thompson 52'; Whittingham 57'; Hasselbaink 66'; Virgo 70' (o.g.)	Report	Jackson 45'	Stadium: Ninian Park; Attendance: 11,006; Referee: Rob Shoebridge

15 December 2007 22	Colchester United	1–1	Norwich City	Colchester
	K. McLeod 78'	Report	Granville 90' (o.g.)	Stadium: Layer Road; Attendance: 5,560; Referee: Mike Jones

22 December 2007 23	Queens Park Rangers	2–1	Colchester United	Shepherd's Bush
15:00 GMT	Buzsáky 27', 52'; Stewart (yellow card) 82' (red card)	Report	Yeates 62'	Stadium: Loftus Road; Attendance: 12,464; Referee: Dean Whitestone

26 December 2007 24	Colchester United	1–1	Southampton	Colchester
	Platt 47'	Report	Viáfara 19'	Stadium: Layer Road; Attendance: 6,157; Referee: Jarnail Singh

29 December 2007 25	Colchester United	0–2	Blackpool	Colchester
		Report	Vernon 26', 36'	Stadium: Layer Road; Attendance: 4,160; Referee: P Armstrong

1 January 2008 26	Charlton Athletic	1–2	Colchester United	Charlton
15:00 GMT	Varney 45'	Report	Lisbie 16' (pen.), 29'	Stadium: The Valley; Attendance: 21,508; Referee: Clive Penton

12 January 2008 27	Bristol City	1–1	Colchester United	Bristol
	Sproule 33'	Report	Lisbie 6'	Stadium: Ashton Gate Stadium; Attendance: 16,484; Referee: Grant Hegley

29 January 2008 28	Barnsley	1–0	Colchester United	Barnsley
	Macken 45'	Report		Stadium: Oakwell; Attendance: 9,246; Referee: Nigel Miller

2 February 2008 29	Colchester United	2–2	Sheffield United	Colchester
	Lisbie 46'; Armstrong 64' (o.g.)	Report	Shelton 45'; Carney 66'	Stadium: Layer Road; Attendance: 5,695; Referee: Keith Hill

9 February 2008 30	Burnley	1–1	Colchester United	Burnley
	Cole 23'	Report	Jackson 38'	Stadium: Turf Moor; Attendance: 15,376; Referee: Steve Bratt

12 February 2008 31	Colchester United	2–1	Preston North End	Colchester
	Vernon 68' (pen.); Jackson 88'	Report	Mellor 81'; St Ledger (red card) 68'	Stadium: Layer Road; Attendance: 5,122; Referee: Paul Taylor

16 February 2008 32	Hull City	1–1	Colchester United	Kingston upon Hull
	Campbell 64'	Report	Jackson 47'	Stadium: KC Stadium; Attendance: 15,664; Referee: Peter Walton

23 February 2008 33	Colchester United	1–2	Bristol City	Colchester
	Platt 50'	Report	Adebola 52'; McIndoe 58'; Orr (yellow card) 79' (red card)	Stadium: Layer Road; Attendance: 5,609; Referee: Anthony Taylor

1 March 2008 34	Colchester United	0–1	Wolverhampton Wanderers	Colchester
		Report	Ebanks-Blake 30'	Stadium: Layer Road; Attendance: 5,989; Referee: Iain Williamson

4 March 2008 35	Plymouth Argyle	4–1	Colchester United	Plymouth
	Ifil 11' (o.g.); Easter 57'; MacLean 60'; Sawyer 68'	Report	Lisbie 64'	Stadium: Home Park; Attendance: 11,562; Referee: Mick Russell

8 March 2008 36	Crystal Palace	2–1	Colchester United	Selhurst
15:00 GMT	Ifil 21' (o.g.); Watson 74'	Report	Lisbie 23'	Stadium: Selhurst Park; Attendance: 13,895; Referee: Phil Joslin

11 March 2008 37	Colchester United	1–2	Sheffield Wednesday	Colchester
	Lisbie 4'	Report	Burtpn 18'; Small 44'	Stadium: Layer Road; Attendance: 5,086; Referee: Kevin Friend

15 March 2008 38	Colchester United	1–1	Cardiff City	Colchester
	Jackson 71'	Report	Parry 11'; Hasselbaink (red card) 62'	Stadium: Layer Road; Attendance: 4,699; Referee: Kevin Wright

18 March 2008 39	Colchester United	1–3	Hull City	Colchester
	Lisbie 37'	Report	Campbell 20', 33'; Folan 87'	Stadium: Layer Road; Attendance: 5,497; Referee: Pat Miller

22 March 2008 40	Norwich City	5–1	Colchester United	Norwich
15:00 GMT	Otsemobor 6'; Cureton 36', 53' (pen.), 87'; Dublin 90'	Report	Lisbie 41'	Stadium: Carrow Road; Attendance: 25,215; Referee: Mark Heywood

29 March 2008 41	West Bromwich Albion	4–3	Colchester United	West Bromwich
15:00 GMT	Phillips 36'; Brunt 39'; Morrison 90'; Bednář 90'	Report	Coyne 14'; Elito 17'; Lisbie 76'	Stadium: The Hawthorns; Attendance: 20,433; Referee: G Laws

5 April 2008 42	Colchester United	2–0	Ipswich Town	Colchester
	Vernon 29', 73'	Report		Stadium: Layer Road; Attendance: 6,264; Referee: Andy D'Urso

12 April 2008 43	Leicester City	1–1	Colchester United	Leicester
	Hume 89'	Report	Lisbie 76'	Stadium: Walkers Stadium; Attendance: 22,719; Referee: Neil Swarbrick

19 April 2008 44	Colchester United	1–5	Coventry City	Colchester
	Vernon 17'	Report	Best 48'; Fox 51'; Ward 78' (pen.), 90' (pen.); Doyle 80'	Stadium: Layer Road; Attendance: 5,836; Referee: Colin Webster

26 April 2008 45	Colchester United	0–1	Stoke City	Colchester
		Report	Cresswell 45'	Stadium: Layer Road; Attendance: 6,300; Referee: Kevin Friend

4 May 2008 46	Scunthorpe United	3–3	Colchester United	Scunthorpe
	Forte 15'; Hayes 67', 82'	Report	McLeod 11', 48'; Vernon 47'	Stadium: Glanford Park; Attendance: 5,554; Referee: R Booth

=== Football League Cup ===
14 August 2007 1st round	Shrewsbury Town	1–0 (a.e.t.)	Colchester United	Shrewsbury
	Kempson 106'	Report		Stadium: New Meadow; Attendance: 3,069; Referee: Richard Beeby

=== FA Cup ===
5 January 2008 3rd round	Colchester United	1–3	Peterborough United	Colchester
	Sheringham 43' (pen.)	Report	McLean 4'; Boyd 46'; Lee 73'	Stadium: Layer Road; Attendance: 4,003; Referee: Andre Marriner

== Squad statistics ==
=== Appearances and goals ===
No.	Pos	Nat	Player	Total		Championship		FA Cup		League Cup	
No.	Pos	Nat	Player	Apps	Goals	Apps	Goals	Apps	Goals	Apps	Goals
1	GK	(England) ENG	Dean Gerken	42	0	40	0	1	0	1	0
2	DF	(England) ENG	Danny Granville	20	0	14+5	0	0	0	1	0
3	DF	(England) ENG	John White	23	0	21	0	1	0	1	0
4	MF	(England) ENG	Johnnie Jackson	48	7	46	7	1	0	1	0
5	DF	(Australia) AUS	Chris Coyne	16	1	16	1	0	0	0	0
6	MF	(England) ENG	Kevin Watson	7	0	7	0	0	0	0	0
7	MF	(England) ENG	Karl Duguid	39	0	37	0	0+1	0	1	0
8	FW	(England) ENG	Teddy Sheringham	20	4	11+8	3	1	1	0	0
9	FW	(England) ENG	Clive Platt	42	8	34+7	8	0	0	1	0
10	MF	(England) ENG	Kemal Izzet	40	1	35+4	1	0	0	0+1	0
11	FW	(Republic of Ireland) IRL	Mark Yeates	31	8	29	8	1	0	1	0
12	DF	(England) ENG	Pat Baldwin	28	0	23+3	0	1	0	1	0
13	GK	(Northern Ireland) NIR	Aidan Davison	6	0	6	0	0	0	0	0
14	FW	(England) ENG	Kevin McLeod	30	4	21+7	4	1	0	1	0
15	FW	(England) ENG	Jamie Guy	12	0	0+11	0	0+1	0	0	0
17	MF	(England) ENG	Luke Guttridge	16	0	5+9	0	1	0	1	0
18	DF	(England) ENG	Philip Ifil	20	0	20	0	0	0	0	0
20	FW	(Jamaica) JAM	Kevin Lisbie	43	17	39+3	17	1	0	0	0
22	MF	(England) ENG	Dean Hammond	13	0	11+2	0	0	0	0	0
23	GK	(England) ENG	Mark Cousins	2	0	0+2	0	0	0	0	0
24	FW	(England) ENG	Scott Vernon	17	5	8+9	5	0	0	0	0
27	MF	(England) ENG	Anthony Wordsworth	4	0	1+2	0	0	0	0+1	0
29	FW	(England) ENG	Tom Webb	1	0	0	0	0	0	0+1	0
30	FW	(England) ENG	Medy Elito	11	1	7+4	1	0	0	0	0
Players who appeared for Colchester who left during the season
16	DF	(Cameroon) CMR	George Elokobi	19	1	17	1	1	0	1	0
16	DF	(England) ENG	Matt Heath	5	0	5	0	0	0	0	0
18	DF	(England) ENG	Matthew Connolly	16	2	13+3	2	0	0	0	0
19	DF	(Scotland) SCO	Adam Virgo	37	1	30+6	1	1	0	0	0
21	DF	(Hungary) HUN	Béla Balogh	17	0	10+7	0	0	0	0	0
25	FW	(England) ENG	Izale McLeod	2	0	0+2	0	0	0	0	0

=== Goalscorers ===
Place	Number	Nationality	Position	Name	Championship	FA Cup	League Cup	Total
1	20	(Jamaica)	FW	Kevin Lisbie	17	0	0	17
2	9	(England)	FW	Clive Platt	8	0	0	8
2	11	(Republic of Ireland)	WG	Mark Yeates	8	0	0	8
4	4	(England)	MF	Johnnie Jackson	7	0	0	7
5	24	(England)	FW	Scott Vernon	5	0	0	5
6	8	(England)	FW	Teddy Sheringham	3	1	0	4
6	14	(England)	WG	Kevin McLeod	4	0	0	4
8	18	(England)	CB	Matthew Connolly	2	0	0	2
9	5	(Australia)	CB	Chris Coyne	1	0	0	1
9	10	(England)	MF	Kemal Izzet	1	0	0	1
9	16	(Cameroon)	FB/CB	George Elokobi	1	0	0	1
9	19	(Scotland)	DF/FW	Adam Virgo	1	0	0	1
9	30	(England)	WG	Medy Elito	1	0	0	1
				Own goals	3	0	0	3
				TOTALS	62	1	0	63

=== Disciplinary record ===
Number	Nationality	Position	Name	Championship		FA Cup		League Cup		Total	
Number	Nationality	Position	Name	Booked	Sent off (straight red)	Booked	Sent off (straight red)	Booked	Sent off (straight red)	Booked	Sent off (straight red)
10	(England)	MF	Kemal Izzet	7	0	0	0	0	0	7	0
19	(Scotland)	DF/FW	Adam Virgo	6	0	0	0	0	0	6	0
12	(England)	CB	Pat Baldwin	2	1	0	0	0	0	2	1
1	(England)	GK	Dean Gerken	1	1	0	0	0	0	1	1
4	(England)	MF	Johnnie Jackson	4	0	0	0	0	0	4	0
11	(Republic of Ireland)	WG	Mark Yeates	4	0	0	0	0	0	4	0
18	(England)	CB	Matthew Connolly	1	1	0	0	0	0	1	1
20	(Jamaica)	FW	Kevin Lisbie	4	0	0	0	0	0	4	0
7	(England)	MF	Karl Duguid	3	0	0	0	0	0	3	0
8	(England)	FW	Teddy Sheringham	0	1	0	0	0	0	0	1
9	(England)	FW	Clive Platt	3	0	0	0	0	0	3	0
14	(England)	WG	Kevin McLeod	3	0	0	0	0	0	3	0
15	(England)	FW	Jamie Guy	2	0	0	0	0	0	2	0
16	(England)	CB	Matt Heath	2	0	0	0	0	0	2	0
17	(England)	MF	Luke Guttridge	2	0	0	0	0	0	2	0
18	(England)	RB	Philip Ifil	2	0	0	0	0	0	2	0
21	(Hungary)	DF	Béla Balogh	2	0	0	0	0	0	2	0
2	(England)	FB	Danny Granville	1	0	0	0	0	0	1	0
16	(Cameroon)	FB/CB	George Elokobi	1	0	0	0	0	0	1	0
			TOTALS	52	4	0	0	0	0	52	4

=== Clean sheets ===
Number of games goalkeepers kept a clean sheet.

Place	Number	Nationality	Player	Championship	FA Cup	League Cup	Total
1	1	(England)	Dean Gerken	1	0	0	1
1	13	(Northern Ireland)	Aidan Davison	1	0	0	1
			TOTALS	2	0	0	2

=== Player debuts ===
Players making their first-team Colchester United debut in a fully competitive match.

Number	Position	Nationality	Player	Date	Opponent	Ground	Notes
8	FW	(England)	Teddy Sheringham	11 August 2007	Sheffield United	Bramall Lane	
9	FW	(England)	Clive Platt	11 August 2007	Sheffield United	Bramall Lane	
11	WG	(Republic of Ireland)	Mark Yeates	11 August 2007	Sheffield United	Bramall Lane	(Note: Second debut for the club)
17	MF	(England)	Luke Guttridge	11 August 2007	Sheffield United	Bramall Lane	
18	CB	(England)	Matthew Connolly	11 August 2007	Sheffield United	Bramall Lane	
2	FB	(England)	Danny Granville	14 August 2007	Shrewsbury Town	New Meadow	
27	MF	(England)	Anthony Wordsworth	14 August 2007	Shrewsbury Town	New Meadow	
29	FW	(England)	Tom Webb	14 August 2007	Shrewsbury Town	New Meadow	
19	DF/FW	(Scotland)	Adam Virgo	18 August 2007	Barnsley	Layer Road	
20	FW	(Jamaica)	Kevin Lisbie	18 August 2007	Barnsley	Layer Road	
23	GK	(England)	Mark Cousins	18 August 2007	Barnsley	Layer Road	
5	CB	(Australia)	Chris Coyne	12 January 2008	Bristol City	Ashton Gate Stadium	
18	RB	(England)	Philip Ifil	12 January 2008	Bristol City	Ashton Gate Stadium	
24	FW	(England)	Scott Vernon	2 February 2008	Sheffield United	Layer Road	
23	MF	(England)	Dean Hammond	23 February 2008	Bristol City	Layer Road	
25	FW	(England)	Izale McLeod	1 March 2008	Wolverhampton Wanderers	Layer Road	
30	WG	(England)	Medy Elito	4 March 2008	Plymouth Argyle	Home Park	
16	CB	(England)	Matt Heath	15 March 2008	Cardiff City	Layer Road	

== See also ==
- List of Colchester United F.C. seasons
