= Jerel Ifil =

English footballer

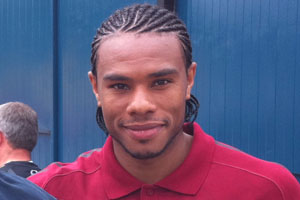

Personal information
- Full name: Jerel Christopher Ifil
- Date of birth: 27 June 1982 (age 44)
- Place of birth: Wembley, London, England
- Height: 6 ft 1 in (1.85 m)
- Position: Defender

Team information
- Current team: Swindon Supermarine

Senior career*
Years	Team	Apps	(Gls)
2001–2004	Watford	11	(0)
2002	→ Huddersfield Town (loan)	2	(0)
2003	→ Swindon Town (loan)	9	(0)
2003	→ Swindon Town (loan)	10	(0)
2003–2004	→ Swindon Town (loan)	10	(0)
2004–2009	Swindon Town	181	(3)
2009–2011	Aberdeen	44	(0)
2011	Bristol Rovers	3	(0)
2011–2012	Kettering Town	28	(0)
2012	Sutton United	1	(0)
2012	Boreham Wood	2	(0)
2012–2014	Staines Town	84	(0)
2018–	Swindon Supermarine	14	(3)
- * Club domestic league appearances and goals as of 15:38, 16 February 2019 (UTC)

Jerel Christopher Ifil (born 27 June 1982) is an English footballer who plays as a defender who plays for Swindon Supermarine. He is the elder brother of fellow footballer Philip Ifil.

== Career ==
Born in Wembley, Greater London, Ifil started his career at Watford where he made his debut in the 2002–03 season. Initially, he went on loan to Huddersfield Town where he played four times.

Ifil originally signed for Swindon Town on a three-month loan deal from Watford in January 2003, returning to the club in September later that year where he further impressed, prompting manager Andy King to request Ifil's loan to be extended but this was refused by Watford. However, Ifil returned on another three-month loan just over a week later in January 2004. After a drawn out transfer saga, the two clubs agreed a £70,000 bid for the player, Ifil signed a two-year deal at Swindon in July 2004. By the time of his departure from the club in 2009, he was Swindon's longest serving player.

In August 2009 Ifil appeared as a trialist for Scottish Premier League side Aberdeen in their 1–0 win over Hull City in a testimonial for Dean Windass. He subsequently signed a two-year deal with the club on 12 August 2009. He made his debut in a 3–1 loss to Celtic on the opening day of the 2009–10 SPL season.

On 31 January 2011, Ifil was released by Aberdeen. On 24 February, Ifil signed for Bristol Rovers on non-contract terms until the end of the 2010–2011 season. He was one of seventeen players released by the team in May 2011.

On 25 July 2011, he signed a two-year contract with Kettering Town.

Having trialled with Torquay United earlier in the summer, he signed for Sutton United at the start of September 2012 and then moved to Boreham Wood shortly afterwards. In November 2012 he joined Staines Town, playing for them until December 2014.

In 2018, after four years out of the game, Ifil joined Swindon Supermarine.

== Personal life ==
Jerel is the brother of fellow professional footballer, Philip Ifil. He is of Saint Lucian and Greek-Cypriot descent.
