= Philip Ifil =

English footballer

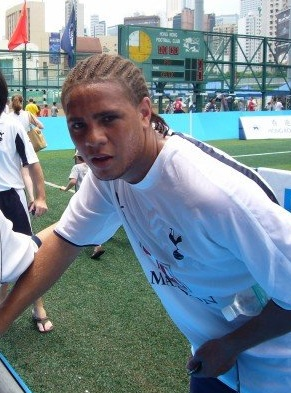
- Ifil in 2007

Personal information
- Full name: Philip Nathan Ifil
- Date of birth: 18 November 1986 (age 39)
- Place of birth: Willesden, England
- Height: 5 ft 9 in (1.75 m)
- Positions: Defender; right-back

Youth career
- 1996–2004: Tottenham Hotspur

Senior career*
| Years | Team | Apps | (Gls) |
| 2004–2008 | Tottenham Hotspur | 3 | (0) |
| 2005 | → Millwall (loan) | 13 | (0) |
| 2006 | → Millwall (loan) | 3 | (0) |
| 2007–2008 | → Southampton (loan) | 12 | (0) |
| 2008–2010 | Colchester United | 53 | (2) |
| 2010–2011 | Dagenham & Redbridge | 14 | (0) |
| 2011–2012 | Kettering Town | 29 | (0) |
| 2021 | Oxhey Jets | 4 | (0) |
| Total | | 131 | (2) |

International career
| 2001–2002 | England U16 | 9 | (0) |
| 2002–2003 | England U17 | 9 | (0) |
| 2004–2005 | England U19 | 10 | (0) |
| 2003–2005 | England U20 | 2 | (0) |
- * Club domestic league appearances and goals

Philip Nathan Ifil (born 18 November 1986) is an English former professional footballer who played as a defender. His former clubs include Tottenham Hotspur, Millwall, Southampton, Colchester United and Dagenham & Redbridge.

== Club career ==
Born in Willesden, London, Ifil attended Gladstone Park Primary School and Willesden High as a schoolboy. He played for Springfield Football Club based in Kingsbury as a boy, where he was scouted by and signed for Tottenham Hotspur at age 10.

Ifil made his debut for Tottenham Hotspur against Liverpool on the first day of the 2004–05 season, and went on to make three appearances in the Premier League. Ifil would make two more appearances for Tottenham in the 2004–05 season, playing a full 90 minutes in a 1–0 win away against Newcastle United and coming on as a 77th-minute substitute in a 3-0 League Cup away win against Burnley. Ifil made only two more appearances for Tottenham, in a 3–1 away win against Port Vale in the League Cup on 8 November 2006 and in the Premier League a 3–3 away draw against Wigan Athletic.

On 28 September 2007 he joined English Championship side Southampton on a three-month loan deal. On 10 January 2008 he was transferred from Tottenham Hotspur to Colchester United for an undisclosed six figure fee, with various add-ons.

At the start of December 2009 Ifil had yet to score his first career goal, however this was to change when he scored two goals in as many games against Brighton on 11 December 2009 and Southend United on Boxing Day 2009.

On 10 September 2010, Ifil joined Dagenham & Redbridge for a one-year contract and made his debut away against Bournemouth in League One a day later. In May 2011 Dagenham announced the release of Ifil at the end of his contract. In July 2011, Ifil was signed by Kettering Town manager Morell Maison after impressing in pre-season.

Ifil joined Wrexham on trial in the hope of winning a contract with the Welsh club in January 2013.

As of December 2020 he was playing for Sun Sports Athletic in the Watford Sunday League. He began the 2021–22 season with Oxhey Jets of the Spartans South Midlands Premier Division.

== International career ==
Ifil represented England at U16, U17, U19 and U20 level, which included 1 appearance at the 2003 FIFA World Youth Championship.

== Personal life ==
Ifil is the brother of fellow professional footballer, Jerel Ifil. He is of Saint Lucian and Greek-Cypriot descent.

== Career statistics ==
Appearances and goals by club, season and competition
| Club | Season | League | | | FA Cup | | League Cup | | Other | | Total | |
| Club | Season | Division | Apps | Goals | Apps | Goals | Apps | Goals | Apps | Goals | Apps | Goals |
|---|---|---|---|---|---|---|---|---|---|---|---|---|
| Tottenham Hotspur | 2004–05 | Premier League | 2 | 0 | 0 | 0 | 1 | 0 | — | | 3 | 0 |
| Tottenham Hotspur | 2005–06 | Premier League | 0 | 0 | 0 | 0 | 0 | 0 | — | | 0 | 0 |
| Tottenham Hotspur | 2006–07 | Premier League | 1 | 0 | 0 | 0 | 1 | 0 | 0 | 0 | 2 | 0 |
| Tottenham Hotspur | 2007–08 | Premier League | 0 | 0 | 0 | 0 | 0 | 0 | 0 | 0 | 0 | 0 |
| Tottenham Hotspur | Total | | 3 | 0 | 0 | 0 | 2 | 0 | 0 | 0 | 5 | 0 |
| Millwall (loan) | 2005–06 | Championship | 16 | 0 | 0 | 0 | 1 | 0 | — | | 17 | 0 |
| Southampton (loan) | 2007–08 | Championship | 12 | 0 | 0 | 0 | 0 | 0 | — | | 12 | 0 |
| Colchester United | 2007–08 | Championship | 20 | 0 | 0 | 0 | 0 | 0 | — | | 20 | 0 |
| Colchester United | 2008–09 | League One | 6 | 0 | 0 | 0 | 2 | 0 | 2 (Note: Appearance(s) in Football League Trophy) | 0 | 10 | 0 |
| Colchester United | 2009–10 | League One | 27 | 2 | 3 | 0 | 0 | 0 | 0 | 0 | 30 | 2 |
| Colchester United | Total | | 53 | 2 | 3 | 0 | 2 | 0 | 2 | 0 | 60 | 2 |
| Dagenham & Redbridge | 2010–11 | League One | 14 | 0 | 0 | 0 | 0 | 0 | 0 | 0 | 14 | 0 |
| Kettering Town | 2011–12 | Conference Premier | 23 | 0 | 2 | 0 | — | | 0 | 0 | 25 | 0 |
| Kettering Town | 2012–13 | Southern League Premier Division | 6 | 0 | 3 | 0 | — | | 2 (Note: One appearance in FA Trophy; one appearance in Northamptonshire Senior Cup) | 0 | 11 | 0 |
| Kettering Town | Total | | 29 | 0 | 5 | 0 | — | | 2 | 0 | 36 | 0 |
| Oxhey Jets | 2021–22 | Spartan South Midlands League Premier Division | 4 | 0 | 2 | 0 | — | | 0 | 0 | 6 | 0 |
| Career total | | | 131 | 2 | 10 | 0 | 5 | 0 | 4 | 0 | 150 | 2 |
