= Pat Baldwin (footballer) =

English footballer (born 1982)

Personal information
- Full name: Patrick Michael Baldwin
- Date of birth: 12 November 1982 (age 43)
- Place of birth: City of London, England
- Height: 6 ft 0 in (1.83 m)
- Position: Defender

Youth career
- 2001–2002: Chelsea

Senior career*
Years	Team	Apps	(Gls)
2002–2012	Colchester United	209	(1)
2003	→ St Albans City (loan)	3	(0)
2009	→ Bristol Rovers (loan)	6	(0)
2010	→ Southend United (loan)	18	(1)
2012	Southend United	2	(0)
2012	→ Exeter City (loan)	9	(0)
2012–2015	Exeter City	73	(1)
2015–2016	Weymouth	5	(0)
Total		325	(3)
- * Club domestic league appearances and goals

Patrick Michael Baldwin (born 12 November 1982) is an English former footballer who played as a defender.

Baldwin began his career at Chelsea, but after failing to break into the first team moved to Colchester United, where between 2002 and 2012, he made over 200 league appearances. He has played for Southend United in two spells and on-loan for Bristol Rovers.

== Personal life ==
Just weeks after signing for Colchester in September 2002, Baldwin was bizarrely involved in two road accidents in the same day while on his way to training from his home in Southend-on-Sea. The first incident was a bump from behind and the second a collision with a mini-bus after skidding across a roundabout. He escaped from both incidents unhurt.

He studied at Staffordshire University for a degree in sports, graduating in 2015.

== Playing career ==
=== Colchester United ===
Baldwin signed for Colchester United from Chelsea on 12 August 2002. Baldwin, born in City of London, failed to make an appearance for the Chelsea first-team, and was released by the club at the end of the 2001–02 season. He had spent ten years as a trainee for the London club, working under Steve Clarke and training alongside the likes of John Terry, Frank Lampard and Eiður Guðjohnsen, with Carlton Cole and Robert Huth in the same youth team as Baldwin.

Baldwin was loaned out to St Albans City in the Isthmian League in 2003, where he made three appearances for the club. After spending two seasons on the fringes of the first-team, he became a regular starter for the U's in the 2004–05 season, being rewarded a new two-year contract in March 2005 and leading him to be named as Colchester United 'Player of the Year' for 2005.

In 2006, an FA Cup run led to Colchester being paired against Baldwin's former club Chelsea, allowing him to play against the club he joined as a ten-year-old. Colchester would lose the game 3–1 after taking the lead. The same season, Baldwin aided the U's to second position in League One and promotion to the second tier for the first time in the club's history during the 2005–06 season.

On 25 November 2006, Baldwin scored his first and only league goal for Colchester in a 3–0 victory in the Essex derby over rivals Southend United.

Baldwin agreed to another two-year contract extension in February 2007 on the back of Colchester's success in their debut season in the Championship, with Baldwin a regular starter. He was sent-off in a 2–1 home league defeat to Crystal Palace on 24 November 2007, his first red card for the club.

In January 2008, Baldwin suffered shoulder and knee injuries that would keep him out for nine months, unable to help Colchester's relegation from the second to the third tier of English football. He played his first game with the reserve team during his comeback at the new Colchester Community Stadium on 9 September 2008.

In January 2009, Baldwin was involved in the U's first away clean-sheet since August 2007 in a 0–0 draw with Bristol Rovers, a span of 17 months, having played in both fixtures, the other being a 3–0 away win at Preston North End. His performances and consistency garnered praise from manager Paul Lambert following a run of good results and clean-sheets. In the summer of 2009, Baldwin signed a new three-year contract extension.

==== Bristol Rovers loan ====
Following an injury lay-off and falling out of favour under new Colchester manager Aidy Boothroyd, Baldwin was signed by Bristol Rovers on loan in November 2009. He made six appearances on loan with Bristol Rovers but his future at Colchester was in doubt, with manager Boothroyd telling Baldwin that he was fifth in line to Magnus Okuonghae, Paul Reid, Danny Batth and Matt Heath in central defence. He was set to sign for Bristol permanently following his loan spell in early January 2010, however with a transfer fee agreed between the two clubs, Baldwin decided to stay and fight for a place with Colchester.

==== Southend United loan ====
On 29 January 2010, both Baldwin and teammate Scott Vernon signed on-loan for rivals Southend United until the end of the season, but neither were able to play in the Essex derby on 8 February. He started against Swindon Town the following day and scored an 89th-minute equaliser to bring the score to 2–2. He made 18 appearances on loan for the Shrimpers.

==== Return to Colchester ====
With Baldwin out of favour under Aidy Boothroyd, his exit in the summer of 2010 to Coventry City and promotion of John Ward from assistant allowed Baldwin an entrance back into the first-team, having played just eight times during the 2009–10 season, benefiting from an injury to Paul Reid. However, he then suffered an ankle injury, keeping him out of action from September to October 2010.

In a 2–0 away defeat to Brighton on 25 January 2011, Baldwin received the second red card of his Colchester career for a second bookable offence late in the game.

Baldwin made his first start of the 2011–12 season in a Football League Trophy match against Barnet on 30 August 2011, a game which Colchester lost 3–1 with Baldwin scoring the U's consolation goal. This was to be his second and final goal for the club.

=== Southend United ===
On 30 January 2012, Baldwin signed permanently for Essex rivals Southend United on a free transfer, following his loan spell with the club in the 2009–10 season. Baldwin made just two appearances for Southend before being shipped out on loan to Exeter City in March 2012 until the end of the season, making nine appearances.

=== Exeter City ===
Baldwin signed permanently for Exeter City on 2 July 2012 following the expiration of his short-term Southend contract. He scored his first goal for the club on 8 December 2012, the opening goal in a 3–2 victory over Rochdale at Spotland.

=== Weymouth ===
He joined Weymouth in June 2015 on a one-year contract. With Weymouth being a part-time club, he took a teacher training course during his time with Weymouth. He retired as a player at the end of the 2015–16 season.

== After football ==
After retiring as a player, he settled in Devon, where he works as a primary school teacher.

== Career statistics ==
Appearances and goals by club, season and competition
Club	Season	League			FA Cup		League Cup		Other (Note: Includes Football League Trophy matches.)		Total	
Club	Season	Division	Apps	Goals	Apps	Goals	Apps	Goals	Apps	Goals	Apps	Goals
Colchester United	2002–03	Second Division	20	0	1	0	1	0	0	0	22	0
Colchester United	2003–04	Second Division	4	0	0	0	1	0	2	0	7	0
Colchester United	2004–05	League One	38	0	5	0	2	0	1	0	46	0
Colchester United	2005–06	League One	25	0	3	0	1	0	5	0	34	0
Colchester United	2006–07	Championship	38	1	1	0	1	0	0	0	40	1
Colchester United	2007–08	Championship	26	0	1	0	1	0	0	0	28	0
Colchester United	2008–09	League One	35	0	1	0	0	0	2	0	38	0
Colchester United	2009–10	League One	7	0	0	0	1	0	0	0	8	0
Colchester United	2010–11	League One	11	0	1	0	1	0	0	0	13	0
Colchester United	2011–12	League One	5	0	0	0	0	0	1	1	6	1
Colchester United	Total		209	1	13	0	9	0	11	1	242	2
St Albans City (loan)	2002–03	Isthmian League Premier Division	3	0	0	0	0	0	0	0	3	0
Bristol Rovers (loan)	2009–10	League One	6	0	0	0	0	0	0	0	6	0
Southend United (loan)	2009–10	League One	18	1	0	0	0	0	0	0	18	1
Southend United	2011–12	League Two	2	0	0	0	0	0	0	0	2	0
Exeter City (loan)	2011–12	League One	9	0	0	0	0	0	0	0	9	0
Exeter City	2012–13	League Two	41	1	1	0	1	0	1	0	44	1
Exeter City	2013–14	League Two	25	0	1	0	1	0	1	0	28	0
Exeter City	2014–15	League Two	7	0	0	0	1	0	0	0	8	0
Exeter City	Total		73	1	2	0	3	0	2	0	80	1
Career total			320	3	15	0	12	0	13	1	360	4

== Honours ==
=== Club ===
Colchester United

- League One runners-up: 2005–06

=== Individual ===
- Colchester United Player of the Year: 2004-05
