= 2008–09 Queens Park Rangers F.C. season =

Queens Park Rangers
2008–09 season
- Manager: Iain Dowie (until 24 October); Paulo Sousa (from 19 November)
- Championship: 11th
- FA Cup: Third round
- League Cup: Fourth round
- Top goalscorer: League: Dexter Blackstock (11); All: Dexter Blackstock (12)
- Highest home attendance: 17,120 (vs. Reading, 31 January 2009)
- Lowest home attendance: 12,286 (vs. Charlton Athletic, 25 November 2008)
- Average home league attendance: 14,003
- Biggest win: 4-0 Vs Carlisle United (26 August 2008)
- Biggest defeat: 0-3 Sheffield United (16 August 2008), Watford (22 November 2008)
Home colours	Away colours	Third colours

During the 2008–09 season, Queens Park Rangers played in the Football League Championship, their fifth consecutive season at this level.

== Pre-season ==
=== New managerial team ===
Ian Dowie was announced as the replacement for Luigi De Canio as manager on 14 May 2008. Tim Flowers was later named Dowie's assistant, reprising his former role with Dowie at Coventry City. Paulo Sousa was named as manager after Ian Dowie was fired. When Sousa was fired, Gareth Ainsworth became caretaker manager.

=== Sponsorship ===
Following the termination of the club's sponsorship deals with Car Giant, Le Coq Sportif and Sellotape at the end of the previous season, in July it was announced that Gulf Air would be the new shirt sponsors. Further sponsorship packages were also announced, including Abbey Financial Services, Chronotech and Lotto Sport Italia.

=== Matches ===
All but one of QPR's pre-season fixtures were held away from Loftus Road while the ground underwent upgrading work ahead of the new season. Despite the optimism surrounding the club on the back of the investment and player transfers, Rangers suffered defeats in 3 out of 5 of their warm-up fixtures. The club started positively, winning 3–1 against Conference National side Stevenage Borough followed by a 1–0 win over Football League One side Northampton Town. However a pre-season tour to Scotland saw Rangers lose 2–0 and 1–0 (respectively) to Scottish Premier League sides Falkirk and Kilmarnock. The pre-season fixtures culminated in a 2–1 defeat at the hands of Serie A side Chievo in front of just 3,540 at Loftus Road.

== Events ==
Queens Park Rangers started the season against Barnsley at Loftus Road. Fitz Hall scored twice in as many minutes after Iain Hume put the Yorkshire side 1–0 up in the fifth minute. Hall also missed a penalty in the second half, but Rangers held on to win the game 2–1. A win at Swindon Town in the League Cup followed before the first defeat of the season, to Sheffield United, 3–0 at Bramall Lane. Comprehensive home wins against Doncaster Rovers, Carlisle United (in the League Cup) and Southampton followed, before a win away against Norwich City saw Rangers put together a five-game unbeaten streak.

A defeat at Coventry City was followed by a 1–0 win at Aston Villa in the third round of the League Cup with Damion Stewart getting the decisive goal. The result meant that QPR entered the fourth round of the competition for the first time since the 1995–96 season, where they were drawn away to reigning Premier League champions Manchester United. The euphoria of the Villa result was short-lived and Rangers returned to losing ways at home to Derby County just three days later. By early October, QPR had slipped to 11th in the Championship, following defeat to league leaders Birmingham City at St Andrew's. Former manager Terry Venables was speculatively linked with a return to Loftus Road to replace Iain Dowie if no improvement was seen in the club's form. Meanwhile, Dexter Blackstock stood out as an early contender for the club's top scorer for the season with 5 goals in 13 matches in all competitions.

On 23 October, reports in the British press announced that the club would cap the maximum ticket price at the Category "C" (£35) level as a response to the worsening financial crisis of 2007–2008. This led commentators to speculate that the club was damaged by negative press surrounding earlier proposed ticket price increases. The following day, Iain Dowie was sacked after just fifteen games in charge of the club. While the press continued to speculate on Dowie's replacement, touting Roberto Mancini and Kenny Jackett among several others as potential candidates, existing player/coach Gareth Ainsworth was appointed caretaker manager in the interim. In his first game in charge Rangers ended Reading's 100% record at the Madejski Stadium, grinding out a 0–0 draw.

Just over three weeks after their defeat at St Andrew's, Rangers played Birmingham again in a mid-week fixture at Loftus Road. In Ainsworth's second match in charge, a ten-man Rangers side won 1–0 courtesy of a 25-yard goal from Samuel Di Carmine. At the start of November, Rangers lost 2–0 to Ipswich Town beating Cardiff 1–0 at Loftus Road one week later. The mid-week League Cup tie at Old Trafford saw QPR defeated 1–0 missing out on the last eight of the competition courtesy of a Carlos Tevez penalty. The woes continued four days later with only the club's second home defeat of the season, this time at the hands of Burnley. By mid-November, the side's average of less than one goal-per-match led to them being ranked 21st in terms of the attacking statistics of the 24 Championship clubs, despite sitting tenth in the league table.

On 19 November, Paulo Sousa, a former Portugal midfielder and previously assistant coach of the Portugal national team, was announced as the first team coach, ending Ainsworth's six-match run as caretaker. The following day, Tim Flowers stepped down as assistant coach and news sources (including the club's official website) reported Rangers had signed Bolton striker Heiðar Helguson on an emergency loan deal. Signed to a 2 1/2-year contract, Sousa became the sixth first team coach of the club in 13 months. Just three days into his appointment, Sousa's first match in charge saw a ten-man QPR comprehensively beaten 3–0 away at Watford, leaving them firmly in mid-table, nine points above the relegation zone and three points from the play-offs. Purported new signing Helguson did not appear for the club at Vicarage Road, with rumours later surfacing the deal had not been completed. A mid-week fixture against struggling Charlton Athletic saw Sousa's first victory (2–1), with Dexter Blackstock (who returned from suspension) scoring twice. Four days later, Rangers travelled across London to Selhurst Park, drawing 0–0 with Crystal Palace, a match which featured Premier League striker Heiðar Helguson, who had completed his loan move from Bolton Wanderers earlier in the week.

QPR played league-leaders Wolverhampton Wanderers in the first match of December. Played in a late kick-off at Loftus Road and in front of the Sky Sports cameras, QPR put on a fine performance, despatching their high-flying opponents with a 1–0 win courtesy of a 20-yard effort from skipper Martin Rowlands in his first full appearance since returning from injury. Despite dominating their next match, away to Sheffield Wednesday, QPR were beaten 1–0. The game marked QPR's 6th defeat from 11 away fixtures, and in which they had only scored twice. One week later, QPR scored their first goal in nine "away" fixtures, managing a 1–1 draw with Plymouth Argyle. Heiðar Helguson put QPR into an early lead before Plymouth equalised late in the second half. On 20 December, Helguson was again on the scoresheet, scoring twice alongside Dexter Blackstock's winner in Rangers' 3–2 victory over Preston North End.

The Christmas period saw QPR draw 2–2, twice surrendering the lead, away from home at Charlton Athletic on Boxing Day. Two days later, QPR played host to Watford, holding them to a 0–0 draw. As the January transfer window opened, QPR signed former England U21 international Wayne Routledge from Aston Villa. The club also made recent loan signings Borrowdale and Helguson's moves permanent. A small crowd of under 9,000 spectators saw Rangers start their FA Cup campaign with a goalless draw with fellow Championship side Burnley, in the third round. Returning to action in the Championship, QPR drew at home to Coventry City on 10 January with Dexter Blackstock again on the scoresheet. The result left QPR in ninth place in the league table for the sixth consecutive match, five points outside of the promotion play-off places and 13 points above the relegation zone. In the same week, Rangers also secured a permanent return to the club for Lee Cook and released veteran Italian midfielder Damiano Tommasi. Travelling to Turf Moor for the FA Cup third round replay, QPR lost 2–1 after Burnley scored from a defensive error in the last minute of extra time. Samuel Di Carmine put Rangers ahead in the 54th minute with Burnley equalising just six minutes later before their last-gasp winner. Martin Rowlands also hit the woodwork and Helguson had a goal disallowed in an eventful match played in front of just 3,760 spectators.

On 17 January, QPR achieved their first away victory in all competitions since September. They defeated Derby County 2–0 at Pride Park Stadium, with new signing Wayne Routledge opening the scoring. Ten days later, Rangers travelled to Bloomfield Road and defeated Blackpool 3–0, with Heiðar Helguson scoring twice. During the same month, QPR terminated former captain Adam Bolder's contract and loaned Zesh Rehman out to Bradford City. On 31 January, QPR extended their unbeaten run to eight matches with a scoreless draw at home to second-placed Reading. The result left Rangers in seventh place with 15 matches remaining, two points outside of the playoff positions and 16 points above the relegation zone.

The next scheduled match, a home fixture against Swansea City, was postponed due to heavy snowfalls in central London. However, QPR continued their unbeaten run into February beginning with a 2–2 draw away to Nottingham Forest. In an entertaining match, Matteo Alberti scored his first goals for the club within the space of three minutes after half-time. On 17 February, the club announced the signing of Spanish midfielder Jordi López on a three-month contract. QPR's unbeaten run was finally ended in their next match, at home, courtesy of Ipswich Town. Despite QPR taking an early lead through a Samuel Di Carmine goal, Ipswich came back to win 3–1. The match was played in front of the Sky Sports cameras and with England national team manager Fabio Capello in attendance. Four days later, Rangers travelled to Cardiff City and earned a 0–0 draw. In a busy fixture period against both play-off rivals and relegation candidates, QPR next faced up to Barnsley at Oakwell. The South Yorkshire club added to Rangers' recent slump in form, running out 2–1 winners.

Rangers' woes continued into March. A second consecutive home defeat to Norwich City (0–1) was followed by a 0–0 draw at home to Sheffield United. On 10 March, QPR suffered their |12th league defeat of the season, 2–0 away to Doncaster Rovers. The run of poor form left Rangers |11th in the Championship league table, eight points adrift of the play-off places and ten points above the relegation zone with nine matches left to play.

QPR's defensive streak improved with a draw to now-relegated Southampton, which was further built on in a 1–0 win over Swansea City, courtesy of Mikele Leigertwood's head. The Hoop's form continued with a 2–1 win over Bristol City. QPR initially went one up with a bending free kick from Jordi López, until a powerful strike from Michael McIndoe put the visitors level. Four minutes later, Adel Taarabt scored the winner from close range.

QPR salvaged a goalless draw against local rivals Crystal Palace, though they could have been 2–0 down with close shots from Craig Beattie and Paul Ifill. Equally, Heidar Helguson scuppered a near open goal. However, the experience of Radek Cerny held QPR on in the final stages.

== Kit ==
a five-year deal with Lotto Sport Italia began as manufacturers of QPR's kit. Airline Gulf Air became kit sponsors.

== Squad ==
Shirt Number	Position	Nationality	Name	League Appearances	League Goals	Cup Appearances	League.Cup Goals	F.A.Cup Goals	Total Appearances	Total Goals
24	GK	ENG	Radek Cerny	42		5			47	
1	GK	ENG	Lee Camp	4		1			5	
23	GK	ENG	Jake Cole							
33	GK	AUS	Reece Crowther							
16	DF	ENG	Matthew Connolly	31		4			39	
15	DF	ENG	Peter Ramage	30		3			34	
13	DF	LAT	Kaspars Gorkss	30		3			35	
2	DF	IRE	Damien Delaney	35	1	5	1		42	2
5	DF	ENG	Fitz Hall	18	2	3			27	2
3	DF	JAM	Damion Stewart	37	2	6	2		43	4
28	DF	ENG	Joe Oastler							
4	MF	ENG	Gavin Mahon	29	2	5			40	2
7	MF	ENG	Adam Bolder						1	
14	MF	ENG	Martin Rowlands	20	2	5			29	2
7	MF	ENG	Hogan Ephraim	16	1				29	1
21	MF	ITA	Matteo Alberti	6	2	1			14	2
18	MF	IRE	Liam Miller	11					13	
37	MF	ENG	Romone Rose						3	
17	MF	ENG	Lee Cook	28	1	4			38	1
20	MF	ESP	Jordi Lopez	7	1				9	1
6	MF	ATG	Mikele Leigertwood	36	2	3			46	2
7	MF	ENG	Wayne Routledge	18	1				19	1
26	MF	ENG	Gareth Ainsworth							
27	FW	ISL	Heidar Helguson	15	5				21	5
10	FW	HUN	Akos Buzsaky	5	1	2			13	1
7	FW	ESP	Daniel Parejo	10		4			18	
8	FW	ENG	Rowan Vine	3	1				5	1
18	FW	ITA	Damiano Tommasi	5					7	
11	FW	ENG	Patrick Agyemang	11	2	1			21	2
22	FW	ITA	Samuel Di Carmine	15	2	3		1	33	3
32	FW	GRN	Antonio German						3	
9	FW	ENG	Dexter Blackstock	26	11	3	1		39	12
39	FW	MAR	Adel Taarabt	5	1				7	1
20	FW	ARG	Emmanuel Ledesma	11	1	4	3		23	4
19	FW	COL	Angelo Balanta	2	1	1	1		13	2

=== Out on loan ===
Note: Flags indicate national team as defined under FIFA eligibility rules; some limited exceptions apply. Players may hold more than one non-FIFA nationality.

No.	Pos.	Nation	Player
9	FW	ENG	Dexter Blackstock (Note: Blackstock was born in Oxford, England, and represented them at U-18, U-19, and U-21 level, but also qualified to represent Antigua and Barbuda internationally and would make his international debut for Antigua and Barbuda in February 2012.) (at Nottingham Forest)
29	DF	ENG	Gary Borrowdale (at Brighton & Hove Albion)

No.	Pos.	Nation	Player
—	DF	PAK	Zesh Rehman (Note: Rehman was born in Birmingham, England, and represented them at U-18, U-19, and U-20 level, but also qualifies to represent Pakistan internationally through his parents and made his international debut for Pakistan in December 2005.) (at Bradford City)

== Transfers ==
=== In ===
Date	Nationality	Position	Name	From	Fee
13 May 2008	(Czech Republic)	GK	Radek Černý	(Czech Republic) Slavia Prague	Free
13 May 2008	(England)	DF	Peter Ramage	Newcastle United	Free
15 May 2008	(Italy)	MF	Matteo Alberti	(Italy) Chievo	£200,000
	(England)	DF	Joe Oastler	Portsmouth	Free
28 June 2008	(Argentina)	MF	Emmanuel Ledesma	(Italy) Genoa	Loan
2 July 2008	(Italy)	FW	Samuel Di Carmine	(Italy) Fiorentina	Loan
31 July 2008	(Spain)	MF	Dani Parejo	(Spain) Real Madrid	Loan
1 August 2008	(Latvia)	DF	Kaspars Gorkšs	Blackpool	£250,000
1 August 2008 (made permanent 8 January 2009)	(England)	MF	Lee Cook	Fulham	Loan (made permanent for £750,000)
10 September 2008	(Italy)	MF	Damiano Tommasi	(Spain) Levante	Free
20 November 2008 (made permanent 2 January 2009)	(Iceland)	FW	Heiðar Helguson	Bolton Wanderers	Loan (made permanent for £500,000)
27 November 2008 (made permanent 2 January 2009)	(England)	DF	Gary Borrowdale	Coventry City	Loan (made permanent for £650,000)
2 January 2009	(England)	MF	Wayne Routledge	Aston Villa	£300,000
15 January 2009	(Republic of Ireland)	MF	Liam Miller	Sunderland	Undisclosed
17 February 2009	(Spain)	MF	Jordi López	(Spain) Mallorca	Free
13 March 2009	(Morocco)	MF	Adel Taarabt (Note: Taarabt was born in Fez, Morocco, but was raised in France and represented them at U-17 and U-19 level before making his international debut for Morocco in February 2009.)	Tottenham Hotspur	Loan

=== Out ===
Date	Nationality	Position	Name	To	Fee
17 July 2008	(England)	GK	Jake Cole	Oxford United	Loan
	(United States)	GK	Matt Pickens		Released
	(England)	GK	Sean Thomas	Wealdstone	Released
	(England)	GK	Chris Goodchild		Released
1 August 2008	(Pakistan)	DF	Zesh Rehman	Blackpool	Loan
1 August 2008	(Wales)	FW	Daniel Nardiello	Blackpool	Part-exchange
6 August 2008	(England)	MF	Simon Walton	Plymouth Argyle	£750,000
11 August 2008	(England)	DF	Chris Barker	Plymouth Argyle	Undisclosed
	(England)	DF	Andrew Howell		Released
	(England)	DF	Aaron Goode		Released
	(England)	MF	Stefan Bailey	Grays Athletic	Released
14 November 2008 (extended 22 December 2008	(Colombia)	FW	Ángelo Balanta	Wycombe Wanderers	Loan
9 January 2009	(Italy)	MF	Damiano Tommasi		Released
	(England)	GK	Jake Cole	Barnet	Loan
	(England)	DF	Gary Borrowdale	Brighton & Hove Albion	Loan
	(England)	MF	Chris Arthur	Rushden & Diamonds	Loan
	(England)	MF	Danny Maguire	Yeovil Town	Loan
	(England)	FW	Dexter Blackstock	Nottingham Forest	Loan

== Results ==
=== Football League Championship ===
Date	League position	Opponents	Venue	Result	Score F–A	Scorers	Referee	Attendance	Ref
9 August 2008	6th	Barnsley	H	W	2–1	Hall (2)	Swarbrick	14,694	
16 August 2008	5th	Sheffield United	A	L	0–3		Laws	25,273	
23 August 2008	8th	Doncaster Rovers	H	W	2–0	Blackstock, Ledesma	Thorpe	15,536	
30 August 2008	8th	Bristol City	A	D	1–1	Blackstock	Deadman	17543	
14 September 2008	4th	Southampton	H	W	4–1	Blackstock (2), Stewart, Agyemang	Friend	13,770	
17 September 2008	4th	Norwich City	A	W	1–0	Rowlands	Shoebridge	24,249	
20 September 2008	4th	Coventry City	A	L	0–1		Whitestone	16,718	
27 September 2008	5th	Derby County	H	L	0–2		Taylor	14,311	
30 September 2008	8th	Blackpool	H	D	1–1	Blackstock	Hegley	12,500	
4 October 2008	11th	Birmingham City	A	L	0–1		D'Urso	18,498	
18 October 2008	7th	Nottingham Forest	H	W	2–1	Balanta, Buzsáky	Graham	15,122	
21 October 2008	9th	Swansea City	A	D	0–0		Bates	13,475	
25 October 2008	9th	Reading	A	D	0–0		Foy	20,571	
28 October 2008	7th	Birmingham City	H	W	1–0	Di Carmine	Attwell	13,594	
1 November 2008	7th	Ipswich Town	A	L	0–2		Kettle	20,966	
8 November 2008	7th	Cardiff City	H	W	1–0	Mahon	Probert	13,247	
15 November 2008	10th	Burnley	H	L	1–2	Blackstock	Woolmer	13,226	
22 November 2008	12th	Watford	A	L	0–3		Penn	16,201	
25 November 2008	10th	Charlton Athletic	H	W	2–1	Blackstock (2)	Stroud	12,286	
29 November 2008	10th	Crystal Palace	A	D	0–0		Styles	16,411	
6 December 2008	7th	Wolverhampton Wanderers	H	W	1–0	Rowlands	Williamson	13,416	
9 December 2008	9th	Sheffield Wednesday	A	L	0–1		Miller	14,792	
13 December 2008	9th	Plymouth Argyle	A	D	1–1	Helguson	Friend	10,747	
20 December 2008	9th	Preston North End	H	W	3–2	Helguson (2), Blackstock	Wiley	14,103	
26 December 2008	9th	Charlton Athletic	A	D	2–2	Cook, Blackstock	Taylor	21,023	
28 December 2008	9th	Watford	H	D	0–0		Penton	16,196	
10 January 2009	9th	Coventry City	H	D	1–1	Blackstock	Stroud	13,330	
17 January 2009	8th	Derby County	A	W	2–0	Routledge, Leigertwood	Wright	28,390	
27 January 2009	7th	Blackpool	A	W	3–0	Helguson (2), Ephraim	Laws	6,656	
31 January 2009	7th	Reading	H	D	0–0		Moss	17,120	
7 February 2009	9th	Nottingham Forest	A	D	2–2	Alberti (2)	Deadman	25,859	
21 February 2009	11th	Ipswich Town	H	L	1–3	Di Carmine	Attwell	13,904	
25 February 2009	11th	Cardiff City	A	D	0–0		East	17,340	
28 February 2009	11th	Barnsley	A	L	1–2	Delaney	Shoebridge	11,614	
3 March 2009	11th	Norwich City	H	L	0–1		Scott	13,533	
7 March 2009	11th	Sheffield United	H	D	0–0		Swarbrick	13,718	
10 March 2009	11th	Doncaster Rovers	A	L	0–2		Webster	10,223	
14 March 2009	12th	Southampton	A	D	0–0		Jones	18,691	
17 March 2009	11th	Swansea City	H	W	1–0	Leigertwood	Horwood	12,288	
21 March 2009	11th	Bristol City	H	W	2–1	López, Taarabt	Hegley	14,059	
4 April 2009	10th	Crystal Palace	H	D	0–0		Mathieson	15,234	
11 April 2009	10th	Burnley	A	L	0–1		Haywood	15,058	
13 April 2009	10th	Sheffield Wednesday	H	W	3–2	Mahon, Vine, Stewart	Deadman	13,742	
18 April 2009	11th	Wolverhampton Wanderers	A	L	0–1		Moss	27,511	
25 April 2009	11th	Plymouth Argyle	H	D	0–0		Miller	14,779	
3 May 2009	11th	Preston North End	A	L	1–2	Agyemang	Oliver	18,264	

=== FA Cup ===
Round	Date	Opponents	Venue	Result	Score F–A	Scorers	Referee	Attendance	Ref
Third round	3 January 2009	Burnley	H	D	0–0		Bates	8,896	
Third round replay	13 January 2009	Burnley	A	L	1–2 (aet)	Di Carmine	Webster	3,760	

=== League Cup ===
Round	Date	Opponents	Venue	Result	Score F–A	Scorers	Referee	Attendance	Ref
First round	12 August 2008	Swindon Town	A	W	3–2	Balanta, Blackstock, Delaney	Beeby	7,230	
Second round	26 August 2008	Carlisle United	H	W	4–0	Stewart, Ledesma (3)	Hill	8,021	
Third round	24 September 2008	Aston Villa	A	W	1–0	Stewart	Mason	21,541	
Fourth round	11 November 2008	Manchester United	A	L	0–1		Dowd	62,539	

== Competitions ==
=== League Championship results summary ===
Overall								Home						Away					
Pld	W	D	L	GF	GA	GD	Pts	W	D	L	GF	GA	GD	W	D	L	GF	GA	GD
46	15	16	15	42	44	−2	61	12	7	4	28	19	+9	3	9	11	14	25	−11

Last updated: 3 July 2009.

=== League Championship results by matchday ===
Match	1	2	3	4	5	6	7	8	9	10	11	12	13	14	15	16	17	18	19	20	21	22	23	24	25	26	27	28	29	30	31	32	33	34	35	36	37	38	39	40	41	42	43	44	45	46
Ground	H	A	H	A	H	A	A	H	H	A	H	A	A	H	A	H	H	A	H	A	H	A	A	H	A	H	H	A	A	H	A	H	A	A	H	H	A	A	H	H	H	A	H	A	H	A
Result	W	L	W	D	W	W	L	L	D	L	W	D	D	W	L	W	L	L	W	D	W	L	D	W	D	D	D	W	W	D	D	L	D	L	L	D	L	D	W	W	D	L	W	L	D	L

Updated to match(es) played on 11 March 2009. Source: Competitive Matches (League Championship)
A = Away; H = Home; W = Win; D = Draw; L = Loss

== League table ==
Pos	Team	Pld	W	D	L	GF	GA	GD	Pts
9	Ipswich Town	46	17	15	14	62	53	+9	66
10	Bristol City	46	15	16	15	54	54	0	61
11	Queens Park Rangers	46	15	16	15	42	44	−2	61
12	Sheffield Wednesday	46	16	13	17	51	58	−7	61
13	Watford	46	16	10	20	68	72	−4	58

Updated to match(es) played on 3 May 2009. Source: The Football League
Rules for classification: 1) points; 2) goal difference; 3) number of goals scored.

=== Friendly matches ===
Date	Opponents	Venue	Score F–A	Scorers	Attendance	Report
19-Jul-08	Stevenage Borough v Queens Park Rangers	A	3-1			
21-Jul-08	Forest Green Rovers v Queens Park Rangers	A				
23-Jul-08	Northampton Town v Queens Park Rangers	A	1-0			
26-Jul-08	Falkirk v Queens Park Rangers	A	0-2			
29-Jul-08	Kilmarnock v Queens Park Rangers	A	0-1		1,814	.
2-Aug-08	Queens Park Rangers v AC Chievo Verona	H	1-2			
5-Aug-08	Queens Park Rangers v Northampton Town	H				
19-Aug-08	West Ham United v Queens Park Rangers	A				

== Statistics ==
=== Goalscorers ===
Rank	Player	Position	Championship	League Cup	FA Cup	Total
1	(England) Dexter Blackstock	FW	11	1	0	12
2	(Iceland) Heiðar Helguson	FW	5	0	0	5
3	(Argentina) Emmanuel Ledesma	MF	1	3	0	4
4	(Italy) Samuel Di Carmine	FW	2	0	1	3
=	(Jamaica) Damion Stewart	FW	2	2	0	4
6	(England) Fitz Hall	DF	2	0	0	2
=	(England) Martin Rowlands	MF	2	0	0	2
=	(Italy) Matteo Alberti	MF	2	0	0	2
=	(Antigua and Barbuda) Mikele Leigertwood	MF	2	0	0	2
=	(Colombia) Ángelo Balanta	MF	1	1	0	2
=	(Republic of Ireland) Damien Delaney	DF	1	1	0	2
12	(Ghana) Patrick Agyemang	FW	2	0	0	2
=	(Hungary) Ákos Buzsáky	MF	1	0	0	1
=	(England) Gavin Mahon	MF	2	0	0	2
=	(England) Lee Cook	MF	1	0	0	1
=	(England) Wayne Routledge	MF	1	0	0	1
=	(England) Hogan Ephraim	MF	1	0	0	1
=	(Spain) Jordi López	MF	1	0	0	1
=	(Morocco) Adel Taarabt	MF	1	0	0	1
TOTAL			42	8	1	51

=== Clean sheets ===
Rank	Player	Position	Championship	League Cup	FA Cup	Total
1	(Czech Republic) Radek Černý	GK	15	1	2	18
2	(England) Lee Camp	GK	2	0	0	2
Total			17	1	2	20
