= Craig Edwards =

Craig Edwards may refer to:

- Craig Edwards (Australian footballer) (born 1961), Australian rules footballer
- Craig Edwards (English footballer) (born 1982), English association footballer
- Craig Edwards (tennis) (born 1955), American professional tennis player
