= Jamie Guy =

English footballer (born 1987)

Personal information
- Full name: Jamie Leslie Guy
- Date of birth: 1 August 1987 (age 39)
- Place of birth: Barking, England
- Height: 6 ft 1 in (1.85 m)
- Position: Forward

Youth career
- West Ham United
- ?–2004: Colchester United

Senior career*
| Years | Team | Apps | (Gls) |
| 2004–2010 | Colchester United | 52 | (3) |
| 2004 | → Tiptree United (loan) | | |
| 2005 | → Gravesend & Northfleet (loan) | 1 | (0) |
| 2006 | → Cambridge United (loan) | 12 | (2) |
| 2008–2009 | → Oxford United (loan) | 21 | (2) |
| 2009 | → Dagenham & Redbridge (loan) | 9 | (1) |
| 2009 | → Port Vale (loan) | 3 | (0) |
| 2010 | Grays Athletic | 15 | (3) |
| 2010–2012 | Braintree Town | 34 | (10) |
| 2011–2012 | → Thurrock (loan) | 6 | (3) |
| 2012–2013 | Maldon & Tiptree | | |
| 2013–2014 | Needham Market | | |
| 2014 | Heybridge Swifts | 10 | (6) |
| 2014 | Bishop's Stortford | 0 | (0) |
| 2014 | Grays Athletic | 16 | (4) |
| 2014–2015 | Witham Town | 16 | (3) |
| 2015 | Harlow Town | 7 | (5) |
| 2015 | Billericay Town | | |
| 2015 | Brentwood Town | 15 | (6) |
| 2015–2016 | Heybridge Swifts | 6 | (2) |
| 2016–2017 | VCD Athletic | 21 | (7) |
| 2017 | Great Wakering Rovers | 7 | (1) |
| 2017 | VCD Athletic | 0 | (0) |
| 2017 | Stanway Rovers | 6 | (2) |
| 2017 | Ware | 2 | (0) |
| 2018 | Holland | 3 | (1) |
| 2018 | Walthamstow | | |
| 2018–2019 | Debenham LC | | |
| 2019 | Witham Town | 2 | (0) |
| Total | | 264 | (62) |
- * Club domestic league appearances and goals

Jamie Leslie Guy (born 1 August 1987) is an English former professional footballer who played as a forward. He played in the English Football League before dropping into non-League football following injury problems.

He enjoyed a six-year career with Colchester United between 2004 and 2010, playing on loan for Tiptree United, Gravesend & Northfleet, Cambridge United, Oxford United, Dagenham & Redbridge, and Port Vale. Following a brief spell with Conference club Grays Athletic in 2010, he moved on to Braintree Town of the Conference South. He won promotion in his first season with the club but suffered a double open fractured leg in a match against Eastleigh. He played on loan at Thurrock in 2011–12 to aid his recovery. He later played for non-League sides Maldon & Tiptree, Needham Market, Heybridge Swifts, Bishop's Stortford, Witham Town, Billericay Town, Brentwood Town, VCD Athletic, Great Wakering Rovers, Stanway Rovers, Ware, Holland, Walthamstow, Debenham LC and Witham Town.

== Career ==
=== Colchester United and first convictions ===
Guy was born in Barking. He joined the Colchester United youth team, turning professional at the club in 2004. At the start of the 2004–05 season, Guy joined non-League Tiptree United on a one-month loan. He returned to parent club Colchester to make his senior debut at Layer Road in a 1–0 defeat to Blackpool on 5 February 2005 as an 82nd-minute substitute. Three weeks later he played the last two minutes of a 2–0 defeat away at Hull City.

Starting the 2005–06 season, Guy joined Gravesend & Northfleet on loan for October; however, after making his debut as a second-half substitute in a 2–2 draw with York City at Stonebridge Road, he played no further part in the club's Conference National campaign. Back with Colchester, he got his first start in a Football League Trophy game at Milton Keynes Dons. In February, he returned to the Conference on loan with Cambridge United. He scored his first goal in a 1–0 defeat of Woking on 4 March and on 4 April scored a last-minute winning goal at the Abbey Stadium against Exeter City. He spent mid-March back at Layer Road, playing both legs of the League Trophy Southern final clash with eventual winners Swansea City.

He spent all of the 2006–07 season with Colchester in the Championship. He scored his first senior goal in the 2–1 defeat to West Bromwich Albion on 19 August. Also, he scored late goals against Coventry City and league leaders Cardiff City. Colchester ended the 2006–07 campaign in tenth place, the best league finish in the club's history. In July, he signed an extended contract with the club. The following season he featured less frequently, making only 12 appearances.

In June 2007, Guy was fined £550 after pleading guilty to creating a disturbance in the Colchester town centre the previous month. He also received a twelve-month ban for drink driving in July 2008 and a further £100 fine for fighting in a car park.

In need of regular football, Guy joined Conference club Oxford United on a season-long loan deal from Colchester United in July 2008. During the pre-season, Guy was in good form, giving manager Darren Patterson cause for optimism. However, in a pre-season friendly with Portsmouth he suffered a hamstring injury, before also suffering a minor ankle injury. These injuries frustrated attempts to build a strike partnership with James Constable. Following Patterson's departure in late November, Guy was unsure of his future at the Kassam Stadium. A few days later he scored two goals in a game for the first time, in the FA Trophy game with Sudbury and was praised by caretaker manager Jim Smith. However, upon Chris Wilder's entrance, Guy departed, as he was recalled to Layer Road at the end of the year. After four games under new Colchester manager Paul Lambert, he joined League Two promotion contenders Dagenham & Redbridge, initially on a one-month loan. He made his debut for the club on 3 March, coming on as a late substitute in a 3–0 home defeat to Lincoln City. After scoring the only goal in a league match against Port Vale at Vale Park seven days later, the "Daggers" were keen to extend the deal to the end of the season, which Colchester duly obliged to.

In July 2009, he joined Port Vale on trial, intending to earn a loan move for the start of the 2009–10 season. Guy was especially keen on this prospect, but the deal fell through after he tore cartilage in his knee, requiring surgery to correct the damage.

In September 2009, Guy pled guilty to threatening behaviour and was given a £350 fine, with £200 costs and compensation, after assaulting his ex-girlfriend in an incident in a nightclub in which he "spat in her face and pulled her around by her hair, causing a clump of her hair to come out".

Guy faced no disciplinary action from his club following this conviction, and the proposed loan deal went ahead the following month to run until January 2010. The deal was cut short in November, after five games.

=== Non-League ===
On 19 January 2010, he had his contract at Colchester ended by mutual consent, and signed for Conference National side Grays Athletic two days later. He was released at the end of the 2009–10 season, and subsequently signed for Conference South club Braintree Town in July 2010. Braintree won promotion to the Conference National as champions of the Conference South. However, it was a season hampered by injury for Guy.

During pre-season, Guy suffered another ankle injury after he broke a bone in the joint. In February 2011, he suffered a traumatic injury in a collision with Eastleigh goalkeeper Gareth Barfoot; Guy was left with a double open leg fracture and broken tibia and fibula. Braintree Town and Colchester United organized a benefit match for Guy on 16 July 2011 at Cressing Road, as Guy continued his rehabilitation.

He joined Conference South club Thurrock on a one-month loan in November 2011. Upon his return to Cressing Road he pledged to repay Braintree for standing by him during his recovery. Guy signed with Isthmian League side Maldon & Tiptree in August 2012. The club achieved a second-place finish in Division One North in 2012–13, but lost the play-off final to Thamesmead Town. He signed a two-year contract with league rivals Needham Market in summer 2013. He was transfer listed in December by manager Mark Morsley.

In January 2014, he signed for Heybridge Swifts. He signed with Bishop's Stortford in the Conference South in June 2014, having rejected an approach from Witham Town. He went on to re-sign with Grays Athletic 15 August, having failed to make a competitive appearance for Bishop's Stortford.

Guy left Grays in December 2014, having scored eight goals in 24 appearances in all competitions. He then joined Witham Town on 8 December, and Harlow Town in March 2015. In July 2015 Guy signed for Isthmian League side Billericay Town, Brentwood Town in August 2015, and Heybridge Swifts again in December 2015.

=== June 2016: further conviction for domestic abuse, continued career in non-league ===
In June 2016, he was given a suspended prison sentence after he pled guilty to assault by beating (common assault) and using violence to secure entry to a property after an attack on his then-girlfriend five months earlier.

In August 2016 he joined VCD Athletic, and in January 2017 league rivals Great Wakering Rovers before returning to VCD Athletic in March 2017.

Stanway Rovers signed Guy in June 2017. On 18 November 2017, he made his debut for Ware in the Isthmian League North Division. He was released the following month, as Craig Edwards took over the manager role of the club. He re-united with Holland joint-manager and former Stanway Rovers coach Jon Willis, as he made his debut for Eastern Counties League Division One club Holland in a 3–1 defeat at Framlingham Town on 6 January 2018.

He also featured for Sunday league team Marquis in the Colchester & District Football League during the 2017–18 season.

In June 2018, he joined Walthamstow in the Essex Senior League. On 21 September 2018, he signed for Debenham LC of the Eastern Counties League Division One North. Guy then rejoined Witham Town in July 2019.

== Career statistics ==
Appearances and goals by club, season and competition
| Club | Season | League | | | FA Cup | | League Cup | | Other | | Total | |
| Club | Season | Division | Apps | Goals | Apps | Goals | Apps | Goals | Apps | Goals | Apps | Goals |
|---|---|---|---|---|---|---|---|---|---|---|---|---|
| Colchester United | 2004–05 | League One | 2 | 0 | 0 | 0 | 0 | 0 | 0 | 0 | 2 | 0 |
| Colchester United | 2005–06 | League One | 2 | 0 | 0 | 0 | 0 | 0 | 2 (Note: Appearance(s) in the EFL Trophy.) | 0 | 4 | 0 |
| Colchester United | 2006–07 | Championship | 32 | 3 | 1 | 0 | 1 | 0 | 0 | 0 | 34 | 3 |
| Colchester United | 2007–08 | Championship | 11 | 0 | 1 | 0 | 0 | 0 | 0 | 0 | 12 | 0 |
| Colchester United | 2008–09 | League One | 4 | 0 | 0 | 0 | 0 | 0 | 0 | 0 | 4 | 0 |
| Colchester United | 2009–10 | League One | 1 | 0 | 0 | 0 | 0 | 0 | 0 | 0 | 1 | 0 |
| Colchester United | Total | | 52 | 3 | 2 | 0 | 1 | 0 | 2 | 0 | 57 | 3 |
| Gravesend & Northfleet (loan) | 2005–06 | Conference Premier | 1 | 0 | 0 | 0 | ― | | 0 | 0 | 1 | 0 |
| Cambridge United (loan) | 2005–06 | Conference Premier | 12 | 2 | 0 | 0 | ― | | 2 | 0 | 14 | 2 |
| Oxford United (loan) | 2008–09 | Conference Premier | 21 | 2 | 3 | 0 | ― | | 0 | 0 | 24 | 2 |
| Dagenham & Redbridge (loan) | 2008–09 | League Two | 9 | 1 | 0 | 0 | 0 | 0 | 0 | 0 | 9 | 1 |
| Port Vale (loan) | 2009–10 | League Two | 3 | 0 | 1 | 0 | 0 | 0 | 2 | 0 | 6 | 0 |
| Grays Athletic | 2009–10 | Conference Premier | 15 | 3 | 0 | 0 | ― | | 0 | 0 | 15 | 3 |
| Braintree Town | 2010–11 | Conference South | 26 | 9 | 0 | 0 | ― | | 1 (Note: Appearance(s) in the FA Trophy.) | 0 | 27 | 9 |
| Braintree Town | 2011–12 | Conference Premier | 8 | 1 | 0 | 0 | ― | | 0 | 0 | 8 | 1 |
| Braintree Town | Total | | 34 | 10 | 0 | 0 | ― | | 1 | 0 | 35 | 10 |
| Thurrock (loan) | 2011–12 | Conference South | 6 | 3 | 0 | 0 | ― | | 0 | 0 | 6 | 3 |
| Heybridge Swifts | 2013–14 | Isthmian League Division One North | 10 | 6 | 0 | 0 | ― | | 0 | 0 | 10 | 6 |
| Bishop's Stortford | 2014–15 | Conference South | 0 | 0 | 0 | 0 | ― | | 0 | 0 | 0 | 0 |
| Grays Athletic | 2014–15 | Isthmian League Premier Division | 16 | 4 | 5 | 2 | ― | | 3 (Note: 2 appearances and 1 goal in FA Trophy, 1 appearance in Isthmian League Cup) | 2 | 24 | 8 |
| Witham Town | 2014–15 | Isthmian League Premier Division | 16 | 3 | 0 | 0 | ― | | 0 | 0 | 16 | 3 |
| Harlow Town | 2014–15 | Isthmian League First Division North | 7 | 5 | 0 | 0 | ― | | 1 (Note: Appearance(s) in the play-offs.) | 0 | 8 | 5 |
| Brentwood Town | 2015–16 | Isthmian League Premier Division | 15 | 6 | 5 | 2 | ― | | 2 | 0 | 22 | 8 |
| Heybridge Swifts | 2015–16 | Isthmian League Division One North | 6 | 2 | 0 | 0 | ― | | 0 | 0 | 6 | 2 |
| VCD Athletic | 2016–17 | Isthmian League Division One North | 21 | 7 | 4 | 4 | ― | | 1 | 0 | 26 | 11 |
| Great Wakering Rovers | 2016–17 | Isthmian League Division One North | 7 | 1 | 0 | 0 | ― | | 0 | 0 | 7 | 1 |
| Ware | 2017–18 | Isthmian League North Division | 2 | 0 | 0 | 0 | ― | | 0 | 0 | 2 | 0 |
| Holland | 2017–18 | Eastern Counties League First Division | 3 | 1 | 0 | 0 | ― | | 1 (Note: Appearance in Eastern Counties League Challenge Cup) | 0 | 4 | 1 |
| Witham Town | 2019–20 | Isthmian League North Division | 2 | 0 | 1 | 0 | ― | | 1 (Note: Appearance in Isthmian League Cup) | 0 | 4 | 0 |
| Total | | | 258 | 59 | 21 | 8 | 1 | 0 | 16 | 2 | 296 | 69 |

== Honours ==
Braintree Town

- Conference South: 2010–11
