= 2006–07 Colchester United F.C. season =

Colchester United
2006–07 season
- Owner: Robbie Cowling
- Chairman: Peter Heard
- Manager: Geraint Williams
- Stadium: Layer Road
- Championship: 10th
- FA Cup: 3rd round (eliminated by Barnet)
- League Cup: 1st round (eliminated by Milton Keynes Dons)
- Top goalscorer: League: Jamie Cureton (23); All: Jamie Cureton (24)
- Highest home attendance: 6,065 v Ipswich Town, 29 September 2006
- Lowest home attendance: 4,249 v Barnsley, 12 August 2006
- Average home league attendance: 5,466
- Biggest win: 4–0 v Sheffield Wednesday, 18 October 2006; 5–1 v Hull City, 28 November 2006
- Biggest defeat: 1–5 v Derby County, 2 March 2007
Home colours

The 2006–07 season was Colchester United's 65th season in their history and their first-ever season in the second tier of English football, the Championship. Alongside competing in the Championship, the club also participated in the FA Cup and League Cup.

Following Colchester's promotion from League One, bookmakers had the U's as favourites for an immediate return to the third tier, especially following manager Phil Parkinson's acrimonious resignation and subsequent appointment at Hull City. However, under the guidance of Parkinson's former assistant manager Geraint Williams, Colchester achieved a 10th-place finish in the league, defying the odds and a club record best ever league finish. Indeed, Colchester found themselves on the edges of the play-off positions for much of the season, eventually ending the campaign six points shy after a patch of poor form in February and March.

Colchester for the first time ever entered the FA Cup at the third round stage, but were immediately eliminated by League Two Barnet. They suffered a similar fate in the League Cup when another League Two club Milton Keynes Dons knocked the U's out of the competition in extra time.

== Season overview ==
On 13 June 2006, manager Phil Parkinson who had led Colchester to their first ever promotion to the second tier, resigned. It was a situation reminiscent of George Burley's resignation and move to Ipswich Town in the 1994–95 season. Hull City's chairman Adam Pearson had approached Parkinson illegally regarding their vacant managers position, and as with Ipswich before, was made to pay when Colchester chairman Peter Heard won £400,000 in damages for the club.

New club owner Robbie Cowling's first task was to appoint Parkinson's successor, with Parkinson's former assistant Geraint Williams overseeing pre-season training. He was ultimately appointed following a lengthy recruitment process and charged with leading United into their first season in the Championship. Mick Harford was brought in as his assistant.

On the back of a successful 2005–06 season for midfielder Neil Danns, scoring 15 goals, he left for Birmingham City in a deal worth up to £850,000. Incoming were former U's loanees Jamie Cureton and Johnnie Jackson.

After a solid yet unsuccessful start to the season, Colchester were without a win after four games, albeit defeats by a single goal on each occasion. They earned their first Championship victory on 26 August when they beat Derby County 4–3 courtesy of a Cureton hat-trick. Colchester then hosted Ipswich Town in the first league derby between the two neighbouring sides for 49 years. Colchester stalwart Karl Duguid's goal was enough to hand the U's victory. Parkinson returned to Layer Road with his struggling Hull side in November as Chris Iwelumo equalled a club record and scored four for himself as the U's beat the Tigers 5–1. Parkinson was sacked by Hull five days later after Colchester's eighth successive home victory on their way to eleven consecutive home victories in the league. By Christmas, the U's found themselves in the play-off positions.

Talk at this point turned to the potential for the U's to ground-share Portman Road with Ipswich Town if they achieved the ultimate dream of promotion to the Premier League as the first turf was cut on the new stadium development at Cuckoo Farm.

In January, the U's received a club record £2.5m from Reading for their England under-20s international Greg Halford.

With two games to spare, Colchester were just one point off the play-off places. Defeat at main rivals Stoke City ended their hopes but the 10th-placed finish was the best in the club's history, making them 30th of all clubs in the English football pyramid. Gates at Layer Road had risen to an average of 5,466, the highest since the 1970–71 season with most games sold out.

== Players ==
As of match played 6 May 2007.

| No. | Name | Position | Nationality | Place of birth | Date of birth | Apps | Goals | Signed from | Date signed | Fee |
Goalkeepers
| 1 | Aidan Davison | GK | (Northern Ireland) | (England) Sedgefield | 11 May 1968 (aged 38) | 84 | 0 | (England) Grimsby Town | 5 July 2004 | Free transfer |
| 13 | Dean Gerken | GK | (England) | Southend-on-Sea | 22 May 1985 (aged 21) | 31 | 0 | Youth team | 1 August 2002 | Free transfer |
| 23 | Mark Cousins | GK | (England) | Chelmsford | 9 January 1987 (aged 19) | 0 | 0 | Youth team | 1 August 2004 | Free transfer |
Defenders
| 3 | John White | FB | (England) | Colchester | 26 July 1986 (aged 19) | 65 | 0 | Youth team | 1 July 2003 | Free transfer |
| 5 | Wayne Brown | CB | (England) | Barking | 20 August 1977 (aged 28) | 111 | 4 | (England) Watford | 8 July 2004 | Free transfer |
| 12 | Pat Baldwin | CB | (England) | City of London | 12 November 1982 (aged 23) | 109 | 0 | (England) Chelsea | 16 August 2002 | Free transfer |
| 16 | George Elokobi | FB/CB | (Cameroon) | Mamfe | 31 January 1986 (aged 20) | 17 | 2 | (England) Dulwich Hamlet | 1 August 2004 | Free transfer |
| 17 | Lawrie Wilson | FB | (England) | Collier Row | 11 September 1987 (aged 18) | 0 | 0 | (England) Charlton Athletic | 19 August 2006 | Free transfer |
| 19 | Garry Richards | CB | (England) | Romford | 11 June 1986 (aged 19) | 19 | 0 | Youth team | 1 July 2004 | Free transfer |
| 27 | Matthew Paine | DF | (England) | Sidcup | 22 December 1987 (aged 18) | 0 | 0 | Youth team | 18 December 2005 | Free transfer |
Midfielders
| 4 | Johnnie Jackson | MF | (England) | Camden Town | 15 August 1982 (aged 23) | 8 | 0 | (England) Tottenham Hotspur | 20 June 2006 | Free transfer |
| 6 | Kevin Watson | MF | (England) | Hackney | 3 January 1974 (aged 32) | 105 | 3 | (England) Reading | 5 July 2004 | Free transfer |
| 7 | Karl Duguid | MF | (England) | Letchworth | 21 March 1978 (aged 28) | 353 | 40 | Youth team | 9 December 1995 (Note: Date of signing refers to the date of the player's first game for the club) | Free transfer |
| 10 | Kemal Izzet | MF | (England) | Whitechapel | 29 September 1980 (aged 25) | 200 | 18 | (England) Charlton Athletic | 13 April 2001 | Free transfer |
| 14 | Richard Garcia | MF | (Australia) | Perth | 4 September 1981 (aged 24) | 61 | 14 | (England) West Ham United | 3 September 2004 | Nominal |
| 21 | Robbie King | MF | (England) | Chelmsford | 1 October 1986 (aged 19) | 5 | 0 | Youth team | 1 July 2004 | Free transfer |
| 25 | Anthony Wordsworth | MF | (England) | Camden Town | 3 January 1989 (aged 17) | 0 | 0 | Youth team | 1 July 2006 | Free transfer |
Forwards
| 8 | Jamie Cureton | FW | (England) | Bristol | 28 August 1975 (aged 30) | 10 | 7 | (England) Swindon Town | 6 June 2006 | Free transfer |
| 9 | Marino Keith | FW | (Scotland) | Peterhead | 16 December 1974 (aged 31) | 12 | 4 | (England) Plymouth Argyle | 1 March 2005 | Free transfer |
| 11 | Chris Iwelumo | FW | (Scotland) | Coatbridge | 1 August 1978 (aged 27) | 55 | 19 | (Germany) Alemannia Aachen | 6 July 2005 | Free transfer |
| 15 | Jamie Guy | FW | (England) | Barking | 1 August 1987 (aged 18) | 8 | 0 | Youth team | 1 July 2004 | Free transfer |
| 20 | Kevin McLeod | WG | (England) | Liverpool | 12 September 1980 (aged 25) | 0 | 0 | (Wales) Swansea City | 30 August 2006 | Free transfer |
| 28 | Craig Hughes | FW | (England) | Canterbury | 26 November 1987 (aged 18) | 0 | 0 | Youth team | 24 January 2006 | Free transfer |

== Transfers ==
=== In ===
| Date | Position | Nationality | Name | From | Fee | Ref. |
|---|---|---|---|---|---|---|
| 6 June 2006 | FW | (England) | Jamie Cureton | (England) Swindon Town | Free transfer | |
| 26 June 2006 | MF | (England) | Johnnie Jackson | (England) Tottenham Hotspur | Free transfer | |
| 1 July 2006 | MF | (England) | Anthony Wordsworth | Youth team | Free transfer | |
| 19 August 2006 | FB | (England) | Lawrie Wilson | (England) Charlton Athletic | Free transfer | |
| 30 August 2006 | WG | (England) | Kevin McLeod | (Wales) Swansea City | Free transfer | |

- Total spending: ▼ ~ £0

=== Out ===
| Date | Position | Nationality | Name | To | Fee | Ref. |
|---|---|---|---|---|---|---|
| 31 May 2006 | MF | (England) | Russell Pond | Free agent | Released | |
| 31 May 2006 | FW | (Wales) | Gareth Williams | (England) Weymouth | Released | |
| 19 June 2006 | FB | (England) | Stephen Hunt | (England) Notts County | Released | |
| 20 June 2006 | MF | (Guyana) | Neil Danns | (England) Birmingham City | £500,000 | |
| 11 July 2006 | CB | (England) | Liam Chilvers | (England) Preston North End | Free transfer | |
| 14 July 2006 | FW | (England) | Tony Thorpe | (England) Stevenage Borough | Released | |
| 17 July 2006 | FB | (England) | Sam Stockley | (England) Wycombe Wanderers | Released | |
| 30 January 2007 | FB/MF | (England) | Greg Halford | (England) Reading | £2,500,000 | |

- Total incoming: ▲ ~ £3,000,000

=== Loans in ===
| Date | Position | Nationality | Name | From | End date | Ref. |
|---|---|---|---|---|---|---|
| 16 August 2006 | FB | (England) | Chris Barker | (Wales) Cardiff City | 7 May 2007 | |
| 27 August 2006 | MF | (England) | Ritchie Jones | (England) Manchester United | 27 November 2006 | |
| 23 November 2006 | FW | (England) | Hogan Ephraim | (England) West Ham United | 7 May 2007 | |
| 26 January 2007 | CB | (England) | Matt Mills | (England) Manchester City | 30 March 2007 | |

=== Loans out ===
| Date | Position | Nationality | Name | To | End date | Ref. |
|---|---|---|---|---|---|---|
| 3 November 2006 | GK | (England) | Mark Cousins | (England) Yeading | 3 December 2006 | |
| 8 December 2006 | FB | (England) | Lawrie Wilson | (England) Welling United | 8 January 2007 | |
| 12 January 2007 | MF | (England) | Robbie King | (England) Heybridge Swifts | 12 March 2007 | |
| 26 January 2007 | DF | (England) | Matthew Paine | (England) Thurrock | 31 May 2007 | |
| 9 February 2007 | CB | (England) | Garry Richards | (England) Brentford | 9 March 2007 | |
| 22 March 2007 | FW | (England) | Craig Hughes | (England) Cambridge United | 22 April 2007 | |

== Match details ==
=== Championship ===
==== League table ====
| Pos | Team | Pld | W | D | L | GF | GA | GD | Pts |
|---|---|---|---|---|---|---|---|---|---|
| 8 | Stoke City | 46 | 19 | 16 | 11 | 62 | 41 | +21 | 73 |
| 9 | Sheffield Wednesday | 46 | 20 | 11 | 15 | 70 | 66 | +4 | 71 |
| 10 | Colchester United | 46 | 20 | 9 | 17 | 70 | 56 | +14 | 69 |
| 11 | Plymouth Argyle | 46 | 17 | 16 | 13 | 63 | 62 | +1 | 67 |
| 12 | Crystal Palace | 46 | 18 | 11 | 17 | 58 | 50 | +8 | 65 |

Source: RSSSF
Rules for classification: In the Football League goals scored (F) takes precedence over goal difference (GD).

==== Results round by round ====
| Round | 1 | 2 | 3 | 4 | 5 | 6 | 7 | 8 | 9 | 10 | 11 | 12 | 13 | 14 | 15 | 16 | 17 | 18 | 19 | 20 | 21 | 22 | 23 | 24 | 25 | 26 | 27 | 28 | 29 | 30 | 31 | 32 | 33 | 34 | 35 | 36 | 37 | 38 | 39 | 40 | 41 | 42 | 43 | 44 | 45 | 46 |
|---|---|---|---|---|---|---|---|---|---|---|---|---|---|---|---|---|---|---|---|---|---|---|---|---|---|---|---|---|---|---|---|---|---|---|---|---|---|---|---|---|---|---|---|---|---|---|
| Ground | A | H | H | A | H | A | A | H | A | H | A | H | A | H | A | H | A | A | H | H | A | A | H | A | H | H | A | H | A | H | H | A | H | A | H | A | H | A | A | H | A | H | A | H | A | H |
| Result | L | L | L | L | W | W | D | W | D | W | L | W | L | W | D | W | L | L | W | W | D | W | W | L | W | W | L | D | L | W | D | W | L | L | D | L | D | L | W | W | W | W | D | W | L | L |
| Position | 17 | 21 | 22 | 23 | 22 | 20 | 20 | 16 | 15 | 9 | 13 | 10 | 14 | 10 | 10 | 9 | 11 | 13 | 11 | 7 | 10 | 8 | 6 | 8 | 7 | 6 | 6 | 6 | 8 | 8 | 9 | 8 | 8 | 9 | 10 | 10 | 10 | 10 | 10 | 10 | 9 | 9 | 9 | 9 | 9 | 10 |

Source: Statto.com (archived)
A = Away; H = Home; W = Win; D = Draw; L = Loss

==== Matches ====
| 5 August 2006 1 | Birmingham City | 2–1 | Colchester United | Birmingham |
| 15:00 BST | Campbell 30'; Bendtner 79'; Jerome (red card) 70' | Report | Garcia 51' | Stadium: St Andrews; Attendance: 24,238; Referee: Keith Stroud |

| 8 August 2006 2 | Colchester United | 0–1 | Plymouth Argyle | Colchester |
| | | Report | Summerfield 30' | Stadium: Layer Road; Attendance: 4,627; Referee: R Booth |

| 12 August 2006 3 | Colchester United | 1–2 | Barnsley | Colchester |
| 15:00 BST | Halford 42' | Report | Richards 57'; Howard 78' | Stadium: Layer Road; Attendance: 4,249; Referee: Graham Poll |

| 19 August 2006 4 | West Bromwich Albion | 2–1 | Colchester United | West Bromwich |
| | Ellington 11' (pen.); Wallwork 41' | Report | Guy 83' | Stadium: The Hawthorns; Attendance: 17,509; Referee: Paul Taylor |

| 26 August 2006 5 | Colchester United | 4–3 | Derby County | Colchester |
| 15:00 BST | Cureton 28', 30', 67'; Iwelumo 49' (pen.) | Report | Lupoli 42', 80'; Peschisolido 89' | Stadium: Layer Road; Attendance: 4,574; Referee: Peter Walton |

| 9 September 2006 6 | Burnley | 1–2 | Colchester United | Burnley |
| | Gray 88' | Report | Watson 26'; Iwelumo 54' (pen.) | Stadium: Turf Moor; Attendance: 10,039; Referee: Ray Olivier |

| 12 September 2006 7 | Luton Town | 1–1 | Colchester United | Luton |
| | Parkin 32' | Report | Cureton 40' | Stadium: Kenilworth Road; Attendance: 7,609; Referee: Kevin Friend |

| 16 September 2006 8 | Colchester United | 2–1 | Queens Park Rangers | Colchester |
| | Iwelumo 9'; Garcia 18' | Report | Brown 76' (o.g.) | Stadium: Layer Road; Attendance: 5,246; Referee: Steve Tanner |

| 23 September 2006 9 | Leicester City | 0–0 | Colchester United | Leicester |
| 15:00 BST | | Report | | Stadium: Walkers Stadium; Attendance: 22,449; Referee: C Oliver |

| 29 September 2006 10 | Colchester United | 1–0 | Ipswich Town | Colchester |
| 19:45 BST | Duguid 9' | Report | | Stadium: Layer Road; Attendance: 6,065; Referee: Lee Probert |

| 14 October 2006 11 | Wolverhampton Wanderers | 1–0 | Colchester United | Wolverhampton |
| 15:00 BST | Bothroyd 51' | Report | | Stadium: Molineux Stadium; Attendance: 19,318; Referee: Scott Mathieson |

| 18 October 2006 12 | Colchester United | 4–0 | Sheffield Wednesday | Colchester |
| | Cureton 28'; Halford 56'; Iwelumo 61'; Duguid 83' | Report | | Stadium: Layer Road; Attendance: 5,097; Referee: Richard Beeby |

| 23 October 2006 13 | Coventry City | 2–1 | Colchester United | Coventry |
| | John 45'; Doyle 69' | Report | Guy 85' | Stadium: Ricoh Arena; Attendance: 16,178; Referee: Mike Pike |

| 28 October 2006 14 | Colchester United | 2–0 | Southampton | Colchester |
| | McLeod 3'; Cureton 90' | Report | | Stadium: Layer Road; Attendance: 5,893; Referee: Dean Whitestone |

| 31 October 2006 15 | Norwich City | 1–1 | Colchester United | Norwich |
| 19:45 GMT | Etuhu 72' | Report | Cureton 53' | Stadium: Carrow Road; Attendance: 25,065; Referee: Dermot Gallagher |

| 4 November 2006 16 | Colchester United | 3–1 | Cardiff City | Colchester |
| 15:00 GMT | McLeod 49'; Guy 84'; Cureton 90' (pen.) | Report | Chopra 66'; McPhail (red card) 90' | Stadium: Layer Road; Attendance: 5,393; Referee: Jonathan Moss |

| 11 November 2006 17 | Leeds United | 3–0 | Colchester United | Leeds |
| | Blake 36', 53' (pen.); Cresswell 48' | Report | | Stadium: Elland Road; Attendance: 17,678; Referee: Mike Jones |

| 18 November 2006 18 | Sunderland | 3–1 | Colchester United | Sunderland |
| 15:00 GMT | Elliott 45', 53'; Connolly 90' | Report | Iwelumo 79' | Stadium: Stadium of Light; Attendance: 25,197; Referee: Andy Hall |

| 25 November 2006 19 | Colchester United | 3–0 | Southend United | Colchester |
| | Halford 68'; Baldwin 74'; Cureton 85'; Barker (yellow card) 78' (red card) | Report | Maher (red card) 51'; Gower (yellow card) 56' (red card) | Stadium: Layer Road; Attendance: 5,954; Referee: Steve Bennett |

| 28 November 2006 20 | Colchester United | 5–1 | Hull City | Colchester |
| 19:45 GMT | Iwelumo 19', 54' (pen.), 66', 79'; Cureton 57' | Report | Forster 16' | Stadium: Layer Road; Attendance: 5,373; Referee: Pat Miller |

| 2 December 2006 21 | Cardiff City | 0–0 | Colchester United | Cardiff |
| | | Report | | Stadium: Ninian Park; Attendance: 13,512; Referee: Mike Pike |

| 9 December 2006 22 | Crystal Palace | 1–3 | Colchester United | Selhurst |
| 15:00 GMT | Morrison 87' | Report | Duguid 63'; Garcia 70'; Iwelumo 90' (pen.) | Stadium: Selhurst Park; Attendance: 16,762; Referee: Rob Lewis |

| 16 December 2006 23 | Colchester United | 3–0 | Stoke City | Colchester |
| | Cureton 2', 17'; Garcia 63' | Report | | Stadium: Layer Road; Attendance: 5,345; Referee: Kevin Wright |

| 23 December 2006 24 | Preston North End | 1–0 | Colchester United | Preston |
| | Nugent 33' | Report | | Stadium: Deepdale; Attendance: 14,225; Referee: Mark Halsey |

| 26 December 2006 25 | Colchester United | 4–1 | Luton Town | Colchester |
| 15:00 GMT | McLeod 23'; Iwelumo 41', 65'; Garcia 59' | Report | Vine 85' (pen.) | Stadium: Layer Road; Attendance: 5,427; Referee: P Crossley |

| 30 December 2006 26 | Colchester United | 2–1 | Wolverhampton Wanderers | Colchester |
| | Cureton 4'; Iwelumo 45' | Report | Collins 90' | Stadium: Layer Road; Attendance: 5,893; Referee: Richard Beeby |

| 1 January 2007 27 | Queens Park Rangers | 1–0 | Colchester United | Shepherd's Bush |
| 15:00 GMT | Jones 36' | Report | | Stadium: Loftus Road; Attendance: 11,319; Referee: Peter Walton |

| 13 January 2007 28 | Colchester United | 1–1 | Leicester City | Colchester |
| 15:00 GMT | Iwelumo 48' (pen.) | Report | Hume 19' | Stadium: Layer Road; Attendance: 5,915; Referee: Danny McDermid |

| 20 January 2007 29 | Ipswich Town | 3–2 | Colchester United | Ipswich |
| 15:00 GMT | Lee 31' (pen.); Legwinski 56'; Haynes 82'; Wright (red card) 90' | Report | Duguid 15'; Iwelumo 90' (pen.) | Stadium: Portman Road; Attendance: 28,355; Referee: G Laws |

| 30 January 2007 30 | Colchester United | 1–0 | Preston North End | Colchester |
| | Richards 67' | Report | | Stadium: Layer Road; Attendance: 5,085; Referee: Chris Foy |

| 3 February 2007 31 | Colchester United | 1–1 | Birmingham City | Colchester |
| 15:00 GMT | Izzet 55' | Report | Clemence 66' | Stadium: Layer Road; Attendance: 5,918; Referee: Andy Woolmer |

| 10 February 2007 32 | Barnsley | 0–3 | Colchester United | Barnsley |
| | | Report | Duguid 3'; Cureton 10'; Ephraim 83' | Stadium: Oakwell; Attendance: 11,192; Referee: Colin Webster |

| 13 February 2007 33 | Colchester United | 1–2 | West Bromwich Albion | Colchester |
| | Jackson 55' | Report | McShane 51'; Kamara 52' | Stadium: Layer Road; Attendance: 5,611; Referee: Martin Atkinson |

| 20 February 2007 34 | Plymouth Argyle | 3–0 | Colchester United | Plymouth |
| | Norris 12'; Ebanks-Blake 59' (pen.); Gosling 67' | Report | | Stadium: Home Park; Attendance: 12,895; Referee: Ray Olivier |

| 24 February 2007 35 | Colchester United | 0–0 | Burnley | Colchester |
| 15:00 GMT | | Report | | Stadium: Layer Road; Attendance: 4,934; Referee: Carl Boyeson |

| 2 March 2007 36 | Derby County | 5–1 | Colchester United | Derby |
| | Jones 2'; Lupoli 20'; Barnes 30'; Howard 62' (pen.); Barker 69' (o.g.) | Report | Jackson 56' | Stadium: Pride Park Stadium; Attendance: 26,704; Referee: Mike Jones |

| 10 March 2007 37 | Colchester United | 0–0 | Coventry City | Colchester |
| 15:00 GMT | | Report | | Stadium: Layer Road; Attendance: 5,453; Referee: Keith Stroud |

| 13 March 2007 38 | Sheffield Wednesday | 2–0 | Colchester United | Sheffield |
| 19:45 GMT | Simek 27'; Mills 35' (o.g.) | Report | | Stadium: Hillsborough Stadium; Attendance: 18,752; Referee: Dermot Gallagher |

| 16 March 2007 39 | Southampton | 1–2 | Colchester United | Southampton |
| | Saganowski 26' | Report | Cureton 4', 27' | Stadium: St Mary's Stadium; Attendance: 18,736; Referee: Trevor Kettle |

| 31 March 2007 40 | Colchester United | 3–0 | Norwich City | Colchester |
| | Cureton 52'; Garcia 64'; Iwelumo 73' | Report | | Stadium: Layer Road; Attendance: 5,851; Referee: Iain Williamson |

| 6 April 2007 41 | Southend United | 0–3 | Colchester United | Southend-on-Sea |
| 12:30 BST | | Report | Cureton 1', 63', 73' | Stadium: Roots Hall; Attendance: 10,552; Referee: Kevin Friend |

| 9 April 2007 42 | Colchester United | 2–1 | Leeds United | Colchester |
| 15:00 BST | Iwelumo 82'; Cureton 90' | Report | Lewis 53'; Douglas (yellow card) (red card) | Stadium: Layer Road; Attendance: 5,916; Referee: Alan Wiley |

| 14 April 2007 43 | Hull City | 1–1 | Colchester United | Kingston upon Hull |
| | Forster 25' | Report | Cureton 63' | Stadium: KC Stadium; Attendance: 20,887; Referee: Nigel Miller |

| 21 April 2007 44 | Colchester United | 3–1 | Sunderland | Colchester |
| | Brown 45'; Garcia 82'; Cureton 89' (pen.) | Report | Yorke 55' | Stadium: Layer Road; Attendance: 6,042; Referee: Lee Probert |

| 28 April 2007 45 | Stoke City | 3–1 | Colchester United | Stoke-on-Trent |
| 15:00 BST | Russell 53'; Sidibé 57'; Higginbotham 62' | Report | Iwelumo 38' (pen.); Barker (red card) 78' | Stadium: Britannia Stadium; Attendance: 20,108; Referee: Graham Salisbury |

| 6 May 2007 46 | Colchester United | 0–2 | Crystal Palace | Colchester |
| 13:00 BST | | Report | Scowcroft 11'; Watson 69' | Stadium: Layer Road; Attendance: 5,857; Referee: Richard Beeby |

=== Football League Cup ===
| 22 August 2006 1st round | Milton Keynes Dons | 1–0 (a.e.t.) | Colchester United | Milton Keynes |
| | McLeod 94' | Report | | Stadium: National Hockey Stadium; Attendance: 2,747; Referee: P Crossley |

=== FA Cup ===
| 9 January 2007 3rd round | Barnet | 2–1 | Colchester United | Chipping Barnet |
| | Yakubu 62'; Puncheon 80' | Report | Cureton 35' | Stadium: Underhill Stadium; Attendance: 3,075; Referee: Trevor Kettle |

== Squad statistics ==
=== Appearances and goals ===
| No. | Pos | Nat | Player | Total | | Championship | | FA Cup | | League Cup | |
| No. | Pos | Nat | Player | Apps | Goals | Apps | Goals | Apps | Goals | Apps | Goals |
|---|---|---|---|---|---|---|---|---|---|---|---|
| 1 | GK | (Northern Ireland) NIR | Aidan Davison | 19 | 0 | 19 | 0 | 0 | 0 | 0 | 0 |
| 3 | DF | (England) ENG | John White | 17 | 0 | 8+8 | 0 | 0 | 0 | 1 | 0 |
| 4 | MF | (England) ENG | Johnnie Jackson | 33 | 2 | 24+8 | 2 | 0+1 | 0 | 0 | 0 |
| 5 | DF | (England) ENG | Wayne Brown | 48 | 1 | 46 | 1 | 1 | 0 | 1 | 0 |
| 6 | MF | (England) ENG | Kevin Watson | 42 | 1 | 38+2 | 1 | 1 | 0 | 1 | 0 |
| 7 | MF | (England) ENG | Karl Duguid | 45 | 5 | 42+1 | 5 | 0+1 | 0 | 1 | 0 |
| 8 | FW | (England) ENG | Jamie Cureton | 46 | 24 | 44 | 23 | 1 | 1 | 0+1 | 0 |
| 10 | MF | (England) ENG | Kemal Izzet | 47 | 1 | 45 | 1 | 1 | 0 | 1 | 0 |
| 11 | FW | (Scotland) SCO | Chris Iwelumo | 48 | 18 | 41+5 | 18 | 1 | 0 | 1 | 0 |
| 12 | DF | (England) ENG | Pat Baldwin | 40 | 1 | 35+3 | 1 | 1 | 0 | 1 | 0 |
| 13 | GK | (England) ENG | Dean Gerken | 29 | 0 | 27 | 0 | 1 | 0 | 1 | 0 |
| 14 | MF | (Australia) AUS | Richard Garcia | 38 | 7 | 33+3 | 7 | 1 | 0 | 1 | 0 |
| 15 | FW | (England) ENG | Jamie Guy | 34 | 3 | 1+31 | 3 | 0+1 | 0 | 1 | 0 |
| 16 | DF | (Cameroon) CMR | George Elokobi | 10 | 0 | 8+2 | 0 | 0 | 0 | 0 | 0 |
| 19 | DF | (England) ENG | Garry Richards | 5 | 1 | 3+2 | 1 | 0 | 0 | 0 | 0 |
| 20 | FW | (England) ENG | Kevin McLeod | 25 | 3 | 13+11 | 3 | 1 | 0 | 0 | 0 |
Players who appeared for Colchester who left during the season
| 2 | DF | (England) ENG | Greg Halford | 30 | 3 | 28 | 3 | 1 | 0 | 1 | 0 |
| 18 | DF | (England) ENG | Chris Barker | 39 | 0 | 38 | 0 | 1 | 0 | 0 | 0 |
| 22 | MF | (England) ENG | Ritchie Jones | 6 | 0 | 0+6 | 0 | 0 | 0 | 0 | 0 |
| 22 | DF | (England) ENG | Matt Mills | 9 | 0 | 8+1 | 0 | 0 | 0 | 0 | 0 |
| 24 | FW | (England) ENG | Hogan Ephraim | 21 | 1 | 5+16 | 1 | 0 | 0 | 0 | 0 |

=== Goalscorers ===
| Place | Number | Nationality | Position | Name | Championship | FA Cup | League Cup | Total |
|---|---|---|---|---|---|---|---|---|
| 1 | 8 | (England) | FW | Jamie Cureton | 23 | 1 | 0 | 24 |
| 2 | 11 | (Scotland) | FW | Chris Iwelumo | 18 | 0 | 0 | 18 |
| 3 | 14 | (Australia) | MF | Richard Garcia | 7 | 0 | 0 | 7 |
| 4 | 7 | (England) | MF | Karl Duguid | 5 | 0 | 0 | 5 |
| 5 | 2 | (England) | FB/MF | Greg Halford | 3 | 0 | 0 | 3 |
| 5 | 15 | (England) | FW | Jamie Guy | 3 | 0 | 0 | 3 |
| 5 | 20 | (England) | WG | Kevin McLeod | 3 | 0 | 0 | 3 |
| 8 | 4 | (England) | MF | Johnnie Jackson | 2 | 0 | 0 | 2 |
| 9 | 5 | (England) | CB | Wayne Brown | 1 | 0 | 0 | 1 |
| 9 | 6 | (England) | MF | Kevin Watson | 1 | 0 | 0 | 1 |
| 9 | 10 | (England) | MF | Kemal Izzet | 1 | 0 | 0 | 1 |
| 9 | 12 | (England) | CB | Pat Baldwin | 1 | 0 | 0 | 1 |
| 9 | 19 | (England) | CB | Garry Richards | 1 | 0 | 0 | 1 |
| 9 | 24 | (England) | FW | Hogan Ephraim | 1 | 0 | 0 | 1 |
| | | | | Own goals | 0 | 0 | 0 | 0 |
| | | | | TOTALS | 70 | 1 | 0 | 71 |

=== Disciplinary record ===
| Number | Nationality | Position | Name | Championship | | FA Cup | | League Cup | | Total | |
| Number | Nationality | Position | Name | Booked | Sent off (straight red) | Booked | Sent off (straight red) | Booked | Sent off (straight red) | Booked | Sent off (straight red) |
|---|---|---|---|---|---|---|---|---|---|---|---|
| 18 | (England) | FB | Chris Barker | 4 | 2 | 0 | 0 | 0 | 0 | 4 | 2 |
| 10 | (England) | MF | Kemal Izzet | 6 | 0 | 0 | 0 | 0 | 0 | 6 | 0 |
| 7 | (England) | MF | Karl Duguid | 5 | 0 | 0 | 0 | 0 | 0 | 5 | 0 |
| 14 | (Australia) | MF | Richard Garcia | 5 | 0 | 0 | 0 | 0 | 0 | 5 | 0 |
| 5 | (England) | CB | Wayne Brown | 4 | 0 | 0 | 0 | 0 | 0 | 4 | 0 |
| 24 | (England) | FW | Hogan Ephraim | 4 | 0 | 0 | 0 | 0 | 0 | 4 | 0 |
| 2 | (England) | FB/MF | Greg Halford | 2 | 0 | 0 | 0 | 1 | 0 | 3 | 0 |
| 8 | (England) | FW | Jamie Cureton | 3 | 0 | 0 | 0 | 0 | 0 | 3 | 0 |
| 12 | (England) | CB | Pat Baldwin | 3 | 0 | 0 | 0 | 0 | 0 | 3 | 0 |
| 4 | (England) | MF | Johnnie Jackson | 2 | 0 | 0 | 0 | 0 | 0 | 2 | 0 |
| 6 | (England) | MF | Kevin Watson | 2 | 0 | 0 | 0 | 0 | 0 | 2 | 0 |
| 11 | (Scotland) | FW | Chris Iwelumo | 2 | 0 | 0 | 0 | 0 | 0 | 2 | 0 |
| 20 | (England) | WG | Kevin McLeod | 2 | 0 | 0 | 0 | 0 | 0 | 2 | 0 |
| 22 | (England) | CB | Matt Mills | 2 | 0 | 0 | 0 | 0 | 0 | 2 | 0 |
| 15 | (England) | FW | Jamie Guy | 1 | 0 | 0 | 0 | 0 | 0 | 1 | 0 |
| 16 | (Cameroon) | FB/CB | George Elokobi | 1 | 0 | 0 | 0 | 0 | 0 | 1 | 0 |
| 22 | (England) | MF | Ritchie Jones | 1 | 0 | 0 | 0 | 0 | 0 | 1 | 0 |
| | | | TOTALS | 49 | 2 | 0 | 0 | 1 | 0 | 50 | 2 |

=== Clean sheets ===
Number of games goalkeepers kept a clean sheet.

| Place | Number | Nationality | Player | Championship | FA Cup | League Cup | Total |
|---|---|---|---|---|---|---|---|
| 1 | 13 | (England) | Dean Gerken | 8 | 0 | 0 | 8 |
| 2 | 1 | (Northern Ireland) | Aidan Davison | 5 | 0 | 0 | 5 |
| | | | TOTALS | 13 | 0 | 0 | 13 |

=== Player debuts ===
Players making their first-team Colchester United debut in a fully competitive match.

| Number | Position | Nationality | Player | Date | Opponent | Ground | Notes |
|---|---|---|---|---|---|---|---|
| 4 | MF | (England) | Johnnie Jackson | 5 August 2006 | Birmingham City | St Andrews | (Note: Second debut for the club) |
| 8 | FW | (England) | Jamie Cureton | 5 August 2006 | Birmingham City | St Andrews | |
| 18 | CB | (England) | Chris Barker | 19 August 2006 | West Bromwich Albion | The Hawthorns | |
| 20 | WG | (England) | Kevin McLeod | 9 September 2006 | Burnley | Turf Moor | |
| 22 | MF | (England) | Ritchie Jones | 28 October 2006 | Southampton | Layer Road | |
| 24 | FW | (England) | Hogan Ephraim | 28 November 2006 | Hull City | Layer Road | |
| 22 | CB | (England) | Matt Mills | 30 January 2007 | Preston North End | Layer Road | |

== See also ==
- List of Colchester United F.C. seasons
