= Jordi López (footballer) =

Spanish footballer (born 1981)

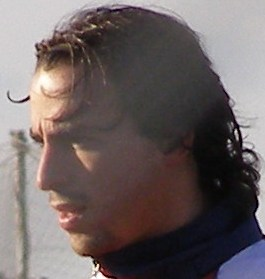
- López with Mallorca

Personal information
- Full name: Jordi López Felpeto
- Date of birth: 28 February 1981 (age 45)
- Place of birth: Granollers, Spain
- Height: 1.82 m (5 ft 11 1/2 in)
- Position: Defensive midfielder

Youth career
- Barcelona

Senior career*
Years	Team	Apps	(Gls)
1998–2002	Barcelona C	64	(8)
2001–2002	Barcelona B	6	(1)
2002–2004	Real Madrid B	69	(6)
2003–2004	Real Madrid	2	(0)
2004–2006	Sevilla	37	(2)
2006–2008	Mallorca	24	(0)
2007–2008	→ Racing Santander (loan)	14	(0)
2009	Queens Park Rangers	10	(1)
2009–2011	Swansea City	15	(0)
2011	Vitesse	15	(2)
2011–2012	OFI	24	(1)
2012–2013	Hoverla Uzhhorod	17	(2)
2013–2016	Llagostera	77	(6)
2016–2017	Sabadell	26	(1)
Total		400	(30)

Managerial career
- 2018–2021: Cornellà (assistant)
- 2021–2023: Terrassa
- * Club domestic league appearances and goals

Jordi López Felpeto (born 28 February 1981) is a Spanish former professional footballer who played mainly as a defensive midfielder, currently a manager.

He achieved La Liga figures of 77 games and two goals over five seasons, representing Real Madrid, Sevilla, Mallorca and Racing de Santander and winning the 2005–06 UEFA Cup with the second of those clubs. He also played in England, Wales, the Netherlands, Greece and Ukraine.

== Playing career ==
Born in Granollers, Barcelona, Catalonia, López played for both FC Barcelona and Real Madrid's reserves to start his senior career. After appearing in five matches with the latter's first team in the 2003–04 season, he represented Sevilla FC for two years. With the Andalusians, he took part in ten games during the 2005–06 victorious run in the UEFA Cup and scored the only goal in an away win against FC Lokomotiv Moscow, netting his first La Liga one in the 3–1 victory at RCD Espanyol on 10 April 2005.

López moved to RCD Mallorca for 2006–07, being loaned the following campaign to fellow top-flight side Racing de Santander, where he was often used from the bench as the Cantabrians achieved a first-ever UEFA Cup qualification. He was subsequently released by Mallorca, and immediately started training with Portsmouth. However, on 19 August 2008, it was revealed he was having a trial with Blackburn Rovers also from the English Premier League; both spells were unsuccessful and he returned to the Balearic Islands, being left to train on his own for the first months of 2008–09 and cutting ties on 17 December.

In January 2009, López was expected to sign during the transfer window with Birmingham City of the Football League Championship, but failed his medical. The following month, he joined another club in the country and its second division, Queens Park Rangers, for the final 15 fixtures of the season, making his debut as a 69th-minute substitute for Matteo Alberti at Barnsley (2–1 loss). He scored his first and only goal for QPR in a 2–1 home win against Bristol City, on 21 March.

After some speculation, López agreed terms to join former Queens Park Rangers boss Paulo Sousa at Swansea City on 16 July 2009, subject to a medical. Four days later, he agreed to a two-year deal.

López failed to win a first-team berth during his two-season spell in Wales, also struggling with injury. On 13 January 2011, he terminated his contract by mutual consent and, the following day, signed for Eredivisie's SBV Vitesse coached by his compatriot Albert Ferrer, leaving five months later.

López then spent one year in the Super League Greece with OFI Crete F.C. and another in the Ukrainian Premier League with FC Hoverla Uzhhorod. The 32-year-old returned to his homeland subsequently, joining UE Llagostera of Segunda División B and helping them to achieve a first-ever promotion to the Segunda División in his debut season; in June 2015, he renewed his two-year contract for another campaign.

Before retiring in 2017 at the age of 36, López represented third-tier CE Sabadell FC.

== Coaching career ==
López spent three years as assistant at UE Cornellà. On 21 June 2021, he was appointed manager of Segunda Federación club Terrassa FC.

== Honours ==
Sevilla

- UEFA Cup: 2005–06
