= Hogan Ephraim =

English footballer

Personal information
- Full name: Hogan Phillip Ephraim
- Date of birth: 31 March 1988 (age 38)
- Place of birth: Archway, London, England
- Height: 5 ft 9 in (1.75 m)
- Positions: Winger; striker

Youth career
- West Ham United

Senior career*
Years	Team	Apps	(Gls)
2004–2008	West Ham United	0	(0)
2006–2007	→ Colchester United (loan)	21	(1)
2007	→ Queens Park Rangers (loan)	13	(2)
2008–2014	Queens Park Rangers	95	(4)
2009–2010	→ Leeds United (loan)	3	(0)
2011	→ Charlton Athletic (loan)	5	(1)
2012	→ Bristol City (loan)	5	(1)
2013	→ Toronto FC (loan)	11	(0)
2013–2014	→ Peterborough United (loan)	8	(0)
2014–2015	Wycombe Wanderers	14	(1)
2017	Whitehawk	3	(0)
Total		178	(10)

International career^{‡}
2003–2004	England U16	3	(0)
2004–2005	England U17	13	(6)
2005–2006	England U18	3	(0)
2005–2007	England U19	7	(0)
- * Club domestic league appearances and goals as of 16:58, 7 February 2015 (UTC) ‡ National team caps and goals as of 4 June 2013

Hogan Phillip Ephraim (born 31 March 1988) is an English former footballer. He is a graduate of the West Ham United academy, a former England Under-19 international, and made over 100 appearances for Queen's Park Rangers. His primary position is winger, but he can also play forward.

== Background ==
Ephraim was born on 31 March 1988 in Archway, London. He attended Highbury Grove School from 1999 to 2004 and lives in Highbury, North London.

== Club career ==
=== West Ham United ===
Ephraim joined West Ham as a trainee in July 2004 making one substitute appearance for the Hammers first team during the 2005–06 season in the League Cup win over Sheffield Wednesday in September 2005 and was an unused substitute in the club's 0–3 loss to Italian side Palermo in the 2nd leg of the UEFA Cup 1st round a year later. He joined Championship side Colchester United on a one-month loan in November 2006, saying, "I've played youth football for three years now and I'm looking forward to getting stuck into the Championship. A few clubs were interested but with Colchester being a team on the up, this was my first choice." He extended his loan spell for a further month in December and again in January 2007 until the end of the season. He made 21 appearances for Colchester, scoring one goal. In the 2007/08 season, he joined Queens Park Rangers on a three-month loan in August 2007. QPR manager John Gregory described him as "...technically very gifted and has the versatility to play on the right or left of midfield." He returned to West Ham in November 2007, having made 13 league appearances for QPR, scoring two goals.

=== Queens Park Rangers ===
He joined Queens Park Rangers for an undisclosed fee on 2 January 2008, signing a three-and-a-half-year contract. Ephraim said of the move, "It's a great time to be at QPR. Big things are going to happen here – the new owners are very ambitious." Ephraim went on to become a regular during Queens Park Rangers' promotion campaign, scoring 3 goals during the 2010 to 2011 season. However, after QPR's promotion to the Premier League, an influx of player's saw Ephraim's first team chances limited and he soon fell down the pecking order. He also scored four goals in a 13–0 pre-season friendly win over Tavistock. On 26 November 2009, Ephraim joined Football League One leaders Leeds United on loan until 1 January 2010. QPR decided to not allow Ephraim to be eligible for Leeds' FA Cup games. On 1 December, Ephraim made his Leeds debut in a 2–0 away win against Oldham Athletic. After being limited to substitute appearances against Huddersfield Town and Brentford, Ephraim returned to the starting line-up against Accrington Stanley, on 15 December, in the Football League Trophy and scored his first goal for Leeds as well as providing as assist for Neil Kilkenny's goal. On 1 January 2010, he returned to QPR.

On 9 November 2011, Ephraim joined Football League One leaders Charlton Athletic on loan until 3 January 2012. Ephraim signed on loan for Bristol City on 22 March 2012 until the end of the 2011–12 season. Ephraim scored on his debut on 25 March in a 1–1 away draw with Middlesbrough. Ephraim signed with Toronto FC on loan on 27 February 2013. Ephraim made his debut for Toronto on 2 March in a 1–0 away defeat to Vancouver Whitecaps FC. On 4 June 2013 Ephraim's loan was terminated by Toronto. On 8 November 2013, Ephraim joined Peterborough United on loan for a month. His Peterborough debut came the next day in a 2–0 home win in the FA Cup against Exeter City. Ephraim returned to QPR in February 2014, having made 11 appearances in all competitions for The Posh.

Ephraim was finally released by QPR on 1 July 2014.

=== Wycombe Wanderers ===
On 28 October 2014, Ephraim signed for League Two team, Wycombe Wanderers on a free transfer. On 1 November 2014, Ephraim made his debut appearance against Oxford United, as a second-half substitute in a 2–1 away league win. After appearing in the Football League Two play-off Wembley final for Wycombe Wanderers, Ephraim turned down the offer of a new contract with The Chairboys and subsequently left the club.

=== Whitehawk ===
After being without a club for the first half of the 2016–17 season, Ephraim eventually signed for Brighton-based National League South side Whitehawk in March 2017.

== International career ==
Ephraim has represented England at U-16, U-17, U-18 and U-19 levels. He scored four goals in an England under-17s match against Russia and appeared in the UEFA European Championships in May 2005, scoring two goals in three games.

== Career statistics ==
As of 26 August 2015

Club	Season	League			FA Cup		League Cup		Total	
Club	Season	Division	Apps	Goals	Apps	Goals	Apps	Goals	Apps	Goals
West Ham United	2005–06	Premier League	0	0	0	0	1	0	1	0
Colchester United	2006–07	Championship	21	1	0	0	0	0	21	1
Queens Park Rangers	2007–08	Championship	29	2	1	0	0	0	30	2
Queens Park Rangers	2008–09	Championship	27	1	2	0	0	0	29	1
Queens Park Rangers	2009–10	Championship	22	0	1	0	3	2	26	2
Queens Park Rangers	2010–11	Championship	28	3	0	0	1	0	29	3
Queens Park Rangers	2011–12	Premier League	2	0	0	0	1	0	3	0
Queens Park Rangers	total		108	6	4	0	5	2	118	8
Leeds United (loan)	2009–10	League One	3	0	0	0	1	1	4	1
Charlton Athletic (loan)	2011–12	League One	5	1	0	0	0	0	5	1
Bristol City (loan)	2011–12	Championship	5	1	0	0	0	0	5	1
Toronto FC (loan)	2013	MLS	11	0	-		0	0	11	0
Peterborough United (loan)	2013–14	League One	8	0	2	0	1	0	11	0
Wycombe Wanderers	2014–15	League Two	16	1	2	0	0	0	18	1
Career total			177	10	8	0	7	2	192	12

== Honours ==
Queens Park Rangers

- Football League Championship: 2010–11
