= Craig Edwards (English footballer) =

English Association footballer

Personal information
- Date of birth: 8 July 1982 (age 44)
- Place of birth: London, England
- Position: Midfielder

Team information
- Current team: Billericay Town

Youth career
- Tottenham Hotspur

Senior career*
Years	Team	Apps	(Gls)
2000–2001	Southend United	1	(0)
2001–2002	Grays Athletic	25	(3)
2002–2004	Ford United	69	(7)
2004–2006	Chelmsford City	57	(7)
2006–2012	Bishop's Stortford	65	(9)
2012–2013	Billericay Town	?	(?)
- * Club domestic league appearances and goals as of 19:19, 13 May 2009 (UTC)

Craig Edwards (born 8 July 1982) is an English former footballer, who played as a midfielder.

== Career ==
Edwards made his debut for Southend United in the Football League Trophy on 5 December 2000 at home to Cheltenham Town in the 2–0 victory. He made his debut in the Football League replacing David Lee as a substitute, in a 3–1 win over Mansfield Town in a Division Three match on 5 May 2001.
