= Matteo Alberti =

Italian footballer (born 1988)

Personal information
- Date of birth: 4 August 1988 (age 38)
- Place of birth: Brescia, Italy
- Height: 1.80 m (5 ft 11 in)
- Position: Midfielder

Team information
- Current team: F.C. Sporting Desenzano

Youth career
- Chievo

Senior career*
Years	Team	Apps	(Gls)
2008–2011	Queens Park Rangers	12	(2)
2010–2011	→ Lumezzane (loan)	24	(0)
2012	Ravenna		
2012–2013	Trento		
2013	Darfo Boario		
2013–2014	Alzano Seriate		
2014–	US Governolese		
- * Club domestic league appearances and goals as of 17:40, 23 September 2015 (UTC)

Matteo Alberti (born 4 August 1988 in Brescia, Italy) is an Italian footballer, who plays for US Governolese.

== Career ==
He joined Queens Park Rangers from Chievo Verona youth side and made his debut in the opening game of the 2008–09 season in coming on as a substitute for Emmanuel Ledesma in the opening game of the season at home to Barnsley. When joining QPR, then chairman Gianni Paladini famously told fans that Alberti would score '100 goals a season'.

Alberti scored his first goals for QPR on 7 February 2009; a first half stoppage time strike against Nottingham Forest, closely followed by a second half opener on 48 minutes.

In July 2010 he was loaned to Lumezzane.

On 30 September 2011, Alberti was released by Queens Park Rangers by mutual consent.
