= 2012–13 Wycombe Wanderers F.C. season =

Wycombe Wanderers
2012–13 season
- Chairman: Ivor Beeks MBE; Don Woodward
- Manager: Gary Waddock (until September); Gareth Ainsworth (from September)
- League Two: 15th
- FA Cup: 1st Round
- League Cup: 1st Round
- Football League Trophy: Area Quarter Finals
- Top goalscorer: League: Matt McClure (11); All: Matt McClure and Joel Grant (11)
- Highest home attendance: 7,120 vs. Port Vale, 27 April 2013
- Lowest home attendance: 2,042 vs. Aldershot, 6 November 2012
Home colours	Away colours	Third colours

The 2012–13 Football League Two was Wycombe Wanderers' 125th season in existence and their nineteenth season in the Football League. This page shows the statistics of the club's players in the season, and also lists all matches that the club played during the season.

Wycombe Wanderers ended the season strongly and finished in 15th place in League Two, after a poor start to the campaign.

The end of the season also saw the retirement of Gareth Ainsworth (Wycombe's player-manager). Ainsworth's career had spanned 18 years and saw him play for 10 different clubs. He made his final appearance in Wycombe's 1–1 draw with Port Vale on 27 April 2013.

== League Two ==
=== League table ===
Pos	Team	Pld	W	D	L	GF	GA	GD	Pts
13	Fleetwood Town	46	15	15	16	55	57	−2	60
14	Bristol Rovers	46	16	12	18	60	69	−9	60
15	Wycombe Wanderers	46	17	9	20	50	60	−10	60
16	Morecambe	46	15	13	18	55	61	−6	58
17	York City	46	12	19	15	50	60	−10	55

Updated to match(es) played on 27 April 2013. Source: BBC Sport
Rules for classification: 1) Points; 2) Goal difference; 3) Number of goals scored

== Match results ==
=== Legend ===
Win	Draw	Loss

=== Friendlies ===
Game	Date	Opponent	Venue	Result	Attendance	Goalscorers	Match Report
1	14 July 2012	Farnborough	Cherrywood Road	2–1	362	Beavon 5', 24'	Match Report
2	18 July 2012	Forest Green Rovers	The New Lawn	0–0	382		Match Report
3	21 July 2012	Staines Town	Wheatsheaf Park	2–1	326	Logan 49', Scowen 82'	Match Report
4	23 July 2012	Windsor	Stag Meadow	3–1		Angol 9', Taylor 81', Ainsworth 84'	Match Report
5	25 July 2012	Luton Town	Kenilworth Road	0–0	1,619		Match Report
6	28 July 2012	Fulham	Adams Park	0–3	1,711		Match Report
7	31 July 2012	QPR	Adams Park	0–3	3,787		Match Report
8	4 August 2012	Cambridge United	Abbey Stadium	3–2	615	Beavon 38', 63', Logan 65'	Match Report
9	6 August 2012	Hanwell Town	Reynolds Field	2–0		Trialist ?', Morias ?'	Match Report
10	7 August 2012	Brentford	Adams Park	1–4	915	Dean 58' (o.g)	Match Report
11	29 August 2012	Luton Town	Adams Park	1–1	Behind closed doors	Oli 65'	Match Report

=== Football League Two ===
Game	Date	Opponent	Venue	Result	Attendance	Goalscorers	Match Report
1	18 August 2012	York City	Bootham Crescent	3–1	4,591	Bloomfield 27', Wood 43', Beavon 53'	Match Report
2	21 August 2012	Gillingham	Adams Park	0–1	3,507		Match Report
3	1 September 2012	Southend United	Roots Hall	0–1	4,787		Match Report
4	8 September 2012	Cheltenham Town	Adams Park	1–1	3,667	Lowe 3'(og)	Match Report
5	15 September 2012	Chesterfield	Proact Stadium	1–3	5,113	Trotman 72'(og)	Match Report
6	18 September 2012	Exeter City	St James Park	2–3	3,365	Ainsworth 4', Morgan 52'	Match Report
7	22 September 2012	AFC Wimbledon	Adams Park	0–1	4,260		Match Report
8	29 September 2012	Dagenham & Redbridge	Victoria Road	0–3	1,680		Match Report
9	2 October 2012	Plymouth Argyle	Adams Park	1–1	3,161	McClure 12'	Match Report
10	6 October 2012	Torquay United	Adams Park	2–1	4,205	Doherty 33', Scowen 63'	Match Report
11	13 October 2012	Fleetwood Town	Highbury Stadium	1–0	3,216	Andrade 9'	Match Report
12	20 October 2012	Port Vale	Vale Park	1–4	5,303	Grant 20'(p)	Match Report
13	23 October 2012	Barnet	Adams Park	0–0	3,244		Match Report
14	27 October 2012	Oxford United	Adams Park	1–3	5,498	Grant 49'(p)	Match Report
15	6 November 2012	Aldershot Town	Adams Park	0–0	2,042		Match Report
16	10 November 2012	Rochdale	Adams Park	1–2	3,020	Grant 25'	Match Report
17	17 November 2012	Northampton Town	Sixfields Stadium	1–3	4,764	Grant 72'(p)	Match Report
18	20 November 2012	Rotherham United	New York Stadium	3–2	5,688	Winfield 29', McClure 50', 55'	Match Report
19	24 November 2012	Burton Albion	Adams Park	3–0	3,191	McClure 13', 63', Grant 57'(p)	Match Report
20	1 December 2012	Bristol Rovers	Adams Park	2–0	3,740	Grant 11', Ainsworth 55'	Match Report
Bristol Rovers match originally played on 25 August, match abandoned after 62 minutes due to adverse weather
21	8 December 2012	Morecambe	Adams Park	2–2	3,238	Morgan 22', 50'	Match Report
22	15 December 2012	Accrington Stanley	Crown Ground	2–0	1,050	Andrade 11', McClure 34'	Match Report
23	26 December 2012	Cheltenham Town	Whaddon Road	0–4	3,501		Match Report
24	29 December 2012	Plymouth Argyle	Home Park	1–0	6,983	McClure 11'	Match Report
25	1 January 2013	Exeter City	Adams Park	0–1	3,679		Match Report
26	5 January 2013	Chesterfield	Adams Park	2–1	3,492	Hause 45', Kuffour 54'	Match Report
27	12 January 2013	AFC Wimbledon	Kingsmeadow	2–2	4,507	Kuffour 8', McClure 72'	Match Report
28	19 January 2013	Dagenham & Redbridge	Adams Park	1–0	2,365	Wood 32'	Match Report
29	4 February 2013	Gillingham	Priestfield Stadium	1–0	4,758	McClure 85'	Match Report
30	9 February 2013	York City	Adams Park	4–0	3,383	Morgan 3'(p), 45'(p), Grant 59', Winfield 78'	Match Report
31	12 February 2013	Bradford City	Adams Park	0–3	3,068		Match Report
Bradford City home match originally scheduled for 22 December, match postponed due to waterlogged pitch
32	16 February 2013	Bristol Rovers	Memorial Stadium	0–1	7,324		Match Report
33	23 February 2013	Southend United	Adams Park	1–2	3,518	Morgan 7'	Match Report
34	26 February 2013	Torquay United	Plainmoor	2–1	1,793	Wood 76', McClure 81'	Match Report
35	2 March 2013	Fleetwood Town	Adams Park	1–0	3,162	Stewart 90'	Match Report
36	9 March 2013	Rochdale	Spotland Stadium	1–4	1,979	Lewis 16'	Match Report
37	12 March 2013	Rotherham United	Adams Park	2–2	2,581	Grant 7', Doherty 81'	Match Report
38	19 March 2013	Bradford City	Valley Parade	0–1	8,047		Match Report
Bradford City away match originally scheduled for 26 January, match postponed due to frozen pitch
39	29 March 2013	Accrington Stanley	Adams Park	0–1	4,577		Match Report
40	1 April 2013	Morecambe	Globe Arena	1–0	1,702	Lewis 55'	Match Report
41	6 April 2013	Oxford United	Kassam Stadium	1–0	6,777	Grant 19'	Match Report
42	9 April 2013	Burton Albion	Pirelli Stadium	0–2	2,202		Match Report
Burton Albion away match originally scheduled for 23 March, match postponed due to adverse weather
43	13 April 2013	Aldershot Town	Adams Park	2–1	4,290	McClure 50', Grant 75'	Match Report
44	16 April 2013	Northampton Town	Adams Park	0–0	3,615		Match Report
45	20 April 2013	Barnet	Underhill	0–1	6,001		Match Report
46	27 April 2013	Port Vale	Adams Park	1–1	7,120	Morgan 31'(p)	Match Report

=== FA Cup ===
Round	Date	Opponent	Venue	Result	Attendance	Goalscorers	Match Report
1	3 November 2012	Crewe	Alexandra Stadium	1–4	2,417	Spring 13'	Match Report

=== League Cup ===
Round	Date	Opponent	Venue	Result	Attendance	Goalscorers	Match Report
1	11 August 2012	Watford	Vicarage Road	0–1	5,343		Match Report
After extra time

=== Football League Trophy ===
Round	Date	Opponent	Venue	Result	Attendance	Goalscorers	Match Report
2	9 October 2012	Portsmouth	Fratton Park	3–1	7,292	Grant 1', Morgan 9', 54'	Match Report
Area QF	4 December 2012	Yeovil Town	Huish Park	0–2	1,771		Match Report

== Squad statistics ==
=== Appearances and goals ===
As of 30 April 2013

No.	Pos	Nat	Player	Total		League Two		FA Cup		League Cup		League Trophy	
No.	Pos	Nat	Player	Apps	Goals	Apps	Goals	Apps	Goals	Apps	Goals	Apps	Goals
2	DF	(England) ENG	Danny Foster	10	0	9	0	0	0	0	0	1	0
3	DF	(Wales) WAL	Grant Basey	4	0	3	0	0	0	1	0	0	0
5	DF	(England) ENG	Dave Winfield	32	2	29	2	1	0	0	0	2	0
6	DF	(England) ENG	Leon Johnson	21	0	20	0	0	0	1	0	0	0
7	MF	(England) ENG	Gareth Ainsworth	25	2	25	2	0	0	0	0	0	0
8	MF	(England) ENG	Stuart Lewis	45	2	44	2	0	0	1	0	0	0
9	MF	(England) ENG	Matt Spring	29	1	25	0	1	1	1	0	2	0
10	MF	(England) ENG	Matt Bloomfield	3	1	2	1	0	0	1	0	0	0
11	MF	(England) ENG	Sam Wood	38	3	35	3	1	0	1	0	1	0
12	MF	(Portugal) POR	Bruno Andrade	25	2	22	2	1	0	0	0	2	0
13	GK	(England) ENG	Matt Ingram	8	0	8	0	0	0	0	0	0	0
15	FW	(England) ENG	Dennis Oli	10	0	10	0	0	0	0	0	0	0
17	FW	(Jamaica) JAM	Joel Grant	45	11	42	10	1	0	1	0	1	1
18	DF	(England) ENG	Charles Dunne	42	0	39	0	1	0	0	0	2	0
19	DF	(Antigua and Barbuda) ATG	Marvin McCoy	11	0	10	0	0	0	0	0	1	0
20	FW	(England) ENG	Dean Morgan	35	9	33	7	0	0	0	0	2	2
22	FW	(Ghana) GHA	Jo Kuffour	31	2	30	2	0	0	0	0	1	0
23	DF	(Ireland) EIR	Michael Harriman	20	0	20	0	0	0	0	0	0	0
25	MF	(England) ENG	Lee Angol	4	0	4	0	0	0	0	0	0	0
26	MF	(England) ENG	Jesse Kewley-Graham	9	0	7	0	1	0	0	0	1	0
27	DF	(England) ENG	Anthony Stewart	22	1	19	1	1	0	1	0	1	0
28	MF	(England) ENG	Josh Scowen	36	1	34	1	1	0	0	0	1	0
29	FW	(Northern Ireland) NIR	Matt McClure	27	11	26	11	0	0	0	0	1	0
30	DF	(Ireland) EIR	Gary Doherty	25	2	23	2	1	0	1	0	0	0
32	FW	(England) ENG	Junior Morias	22	0	19	0	1	0	0	0	2	0
33	FW	(England) ENG	Olly Taylor	6	0	6	0	0	0	0	0	0	0
34	DF	(England) ENG	Kortney Hause	11	1	9	1	1	0	0	0	1	0
35	MF	(England) ENG	Georges Ehui	3	0	2	0	0	0	0	0	1	0
37	MF	(England) ENG	Emmanuel Ighorae	0	0	0	0	0	0	0	0	0	0
Players left the club before the end of the season:
1	GK	(England) ENG	Nikki Bull	11	0	9	0	0	0	1	0	1	0
16	FW	(England) ENG	Richard Logan	10	0	8	0	1	0	1	0	0	0
20	FW	(England) ENG	Stuart Beavon	2	1	2	1	0	0	0	0	0	0
23	DF	(Northern Ireland) NIR	Adam Thompson	2	0	2	0	0	0	0	0	0	0
24	DF	(England) ENG	Matthew Parsons	4	0	4	0	0	0	0	0	0	0
36	GK	(Scotland) SCO	Jordan Archer	29	0	27	0	1	0	0	0	1	0
38	FW	(England) ENG	Ade Azeez	5	0	4	0	0	0	0	0	1	0

=== Top scorers ===
Goals	Name	League Two	FA Cup	League Cup	JP Trophy	Total
11	Matt McClure	11	0	0	0	11
=	Joel Grant	10	0	0	1	11
9	Dean Morgan	7	0	0	2	9
3	Sam Wood	3	0	0	0	3
2	Gareth Ainsworth	2	0	0	0	2
=	Bruno Andrade	2	0	0	0	2
=	Gary Doherty	2	0	0	0	2
=	Jo Kuffour	2	0	0	0	2
=	Stuart Lewis	2	0	0	0	2
=	Dave Winfield	2	0	0	0	2
1	Stuart Beavon *	1	0	0	0	1
=	Matt Bloomfield	1	0	0	0	1
=	Kortney Hause	1	0	0	0	1
=	Josh Scowen	1	0	0	0	1
=	Matt Spring	0	1	0	0	1
=	Anthony Stewart	1	0	0	0	1
TOTALS		48	1	0	3	52

*Beavon left the club before the end of the season

=== Disciplinary record ===
Number	Nation	Position	Name	League Two		FA Cup		League Cup		JP Trophy		Total	
Number	Nation	Position	Name	Booked	Sent off (straight red)	Booked	Sent off (straight red)	Booked	Sent off (straight red)	Booked	Sent off (straight red)	Booked	Sent off (straight red)
2	(England)	DF	Danny Foster	3	0	0	0	0	0	0	0	3	0
5	(England)	DF	Dave Winfield	2	0	0	0	0	0	0	0	2	0
6	(England)	DF	Leon Johnson	0	1	0	0	0	0	0	0	0	1
7	(England)	MF	Gareth Ainsworth	3	0	0	0	0	0	0	0	3	0
8	(England)	MF	Stuart Lewis	10	0	0	0	0	0	0	0	10	0
9	(England)	MF	Matt Spring	4	0	1	0	0	0	0	1	5	1
11	(England)	MF	Sam Wood	1	0	0	0	0	0	0	0	1	0
12	(Portugal)	MF	Bruno Andrade	1	0	1	0	0	0	1	0	3	0
16	(England)	FW	Richard Logan	1	0	0	0	0	0	0	0	1	0
17	(Jamaica)	FW	Joel Grant	3	1	0	0	0	0	0	0	3	1
18	(England)	DF	Charles Dunne	8	0	0	0	0	0	0	0	8	0
20	(England)	FW	Dean Morgan	6	0	0	0	0	0	0	0	6	0
22	(Ghana)	FW	Jo Kuffour	2	1	0	0	0	0	0	0	2	1
23	(Northern Ireland)	DF	Adam Thompson	2	0	0	0	0	0	0	0	2	0
24	(England)	DF	Matthew Parsons	1	0	0	0	0	0	0	0	1	0
27	(England)	DF	Anthony Stewart	2	0	0	0	1	0	0	0	3	0
28	(England)	MF	Josh Scowen	13	0	0	0	0	0	0	0	13	0
29	(Northern Ireland)	FW	Matt McClure	0	1	0	0	0	0	0	0	0	1
32	(England)	FW	Junior Morias	3	0	0	0	1	0	0	0	4	0
36	(Scotland)	GK	Jordan Archer	3	0	0	0	1	0	0	0	3	0
38	(England)	FW	Ade Azeez	1	0	0	0	1	0	0	0	1	0
TOTALS				69	4	2	0	4	0	1	1	76	5

== Transfers ==
Players transferred in
Date	Pos.	Name	From	Fee	Ref.
2 July 2012	DF	(Republic of Ireland) Gary Doherty	(England) Charlton Athletic	Free Transfer	
2 July 2012	MF	(England) Matthew Spring	(England) Leyton Orient	Free Transfer	
2 July 2012	MF	(England) Sam Wood	(England) Brentford	Free Transfer	
2 July 2012	FW	(England) Dennis Oli	(England) Gillingham	Free Transfer	
2 July 2012	MF	(England) Lee Angol	(England) Tottenham	Free Transfer	
3 July 2012	FW	(England) Richard Logan	(England) Exeter City	Free Transfer	
28 August 2012	FW	(Ghana) Jo Kuffour	(England) Gillingham	Free Transfer	
Players transferred out
9 May 2012	GK	(England) Steve Arnold	(England) Stevenage	Free Transfer	
9 May 2012	DF	(England) John Halls		Free Transfer	
9 May 2012	MF	(England) Anthony McNamee	(England) Macclesfield Town	Free Transfer	
9 May 2012	GK	(England) Jason Mooney	(England) Tranmere Rovers	Free Transfer	
9 May 2012	FW	(England) Ben Strevens	(England) Gillingham	Free Transfer	
9 May 2012	DF	(England) James Tunnicliffe	(England) Stockport County	Free Transfer	
20 June 2012	FW	(England) Scott Rendell	(England) Luton Town	Undisclosed	
31 August 2012	FW	(England) Stuart Beavon	(England) Preston NE	Undisclosed	
8 November 2012	GK	(England) Nikki Bull		Retired	
16 November 2012	FW	(England) Richard Logan		Free Transfer	
Players loaned in
Date from	Pos.	Name	From	Date to	Ref.
30 August 2012	MF	(Northern Ireland) Adam Thompson	(England) Watford	30 September 2012	
30 August 2012	MF	(England) Matthew Parsons	(England) Crystal Palace	30 September 2012	
13 September 2012	FW	(England) Dean Morgan	(England) Chesterfield	31 May 2013	
18 September 2012	GK	(England) Elliot Parish	(England) Cardiff City	25 September 2012	
25 September 2012	GK	(Scotland) Jordan Archer	(England) Tottenham Hotspur	31 May 2013	
9 October 2012	MF	(Portugal) Bruno Andrade	(England) QPR	31 May 2013	
22 November 2012	FW	(England) Ade Azeez	(England) Charlton Athletic	1 January 2013	
1 January 2013	DF	(England) Michael Harriman	(England) QPR	31 May 2013	
Players loaned out
25 October 2012	GK	(England) Matt Ingram	(England) Oxford City	31 May 2013	
20 November 2012	FW	(England) Olly Taylor	(England) Hitchin Town	20 January 2013	

== See also ==
- 2012–13 in English football
- 2012–13 Football League Two
- Wycombe Wanderers F.C.
- Gary Waddock
- Gareth Ainsworth
