= 2013–14 Wycombe Wanderers F.C. season =

Wycombe Wanderers
2013–14 season
- Chairman: Don Woodward
- Manager: Gareth Ainsworth
- League Two: 22nd
- FA Cup: Second Round
- League Cup: First Round
- Football League Trophy: Area Quarter-finals
- Top goalscorer: League: Dean Morgan (8); All: Matt McClure (9)
- Highest home attendance: 7,004 vs. Northampton Town, 18 April 2014
- Lowest home attendance: 1,279 vs. Bristol City, 8 October 2013
Home colours	Away colours

The 2013–14 Football League Two was Wycombe Wanderers' 126th season in existence and their twentieth season in the Football League. This page shows the statistics of the club's players in the season, and also lists all matches that the club played during the season.

The season also marked the end of Ivor Beeks' 28-year career as Wycombe's chairman, on 21 August 2013. During the 28 years he spent as chairman, he oversaw the club's rise from the Isthmian League into the Football League. He continues his affiliation with the club in the role of vice-president.

Wycombe ended the season in dramatic style, by achieving League Two survival on the final day of the season. On 3 May 2014, Wycombe began the day three points adrift of safety in the relegation zone. However, after a 3–0 victory away at Torquay, coupled with Bristol Rovers' 1–0 defeat to Mansfield, Wycombe stayed up on goal difference, whilst Bristol dropped out of the Football League.

== League data ==
=== League table ===
Pos	Team	Pld	W	D	L	GF	GA	GD	Pts	Promotion, qualification or relegation
20	AFC Wimbledon	46	14	14	18	49	57	−8	53 (Note: On 28 April AFC Wimbledon were deducted 3 points for fielding an ineligible player.)	
21	Northampton Town	46	13	14	19	42	57	−15	53	
22	Wycombe Wanderers	46	12	14	20	46	54	−8	50	
23	Bristol Rovers (R)	46	12	14	20	43	54	−11	50	Relegation to the Conference Premier
24	Torquay United (R)	46	12	9	25	42	66	−24	45	Relegation to the Conference Premier

Updated to match(es) played on 3 May 2014. Source: BBC Sport
Rules for classification: 1) Points; 2) Goal difference; 3) Number of goals scored
(R) Relegated

== Match results ==
=== Legend ===
Win	Draw	Loss

=== Friendlies ===
Game	Date	Opponent	Venue	Result	Attendance	Goalscorers	Match Report
1	6 July 2013	Havant & Waterlooville	West Leigh Park	1–0	395	Morgan 63'	Report
2	9 July 2013	Eastleigh	Silverlake Stadium	3–0	150	Morgan 4', Spring 47', Pittman 81'	Report
3	13 July 2013	Reading	Adams Park	1–3	Behind closed doors	Morgan 65' (pen.)	Report
4	16 July 2013	Staines Town	Wheatsheaf Park	3–0		Scowen 17', Morgan 26', Kuffour 46'	Report
5	17 July 2013	Farnborough	Cherrywood Road	A–A			Report
6	20 July 2013	Aston Villa	Adams Park	2–2		McCoy 11', Johnson 31'	Report
7	26 July 2013	Oxford City	Court Place Farm	1–1	263	Pittman 38'	Report
8	29 July 2013	Burnham	The Gore	5–1	Behind closed doors	Angol 7', 15', 44'(p), Morias 25', Craig 47'	Report

=== League Two ===
Game	Date	Opponent	Venue	Result	Attendance	Goalscorers	Match Report
1	3 August 2013	Morecambe	Adams Park	1–0	3,284	Cowan-Hall 7'	Report
2	10 August 2013	AFC Wimbledon	Kingsmeadow	0–1	4,235		Report
3	17 August 2013	Mansfield Town	Adams Park	0–1	3,352		Report
4	24 August 2013	Oxford United	Kassam Stadium	2–2	7,100	Morgan 44', 59'	Report
5	31 August 2013	Southend United	Adams Park	2–1	3,533	Morgan 7', Craig 32'	Report
6	7 September 2013	Hartlepool United	Victoria Park	2–1	3,640	Kretzschmar 51', 69'	Report
7	14 September 2013	Plymouth Argyle	Home Park	3–0	6,702	Wood 70', Morgan 74', Knott 90+5'	Report
8	21 September 2013	York City	Adams Park	1–1	4,015	Morgan 70'	Report
9	28 September 2013	Rochdale	Spotland Stadium	2–3	2,303	McClure 42', Kuffour 58'	Report
10	5 October 2013	Burton Albion	Adams Park	1–2	3,518	McClure 90+1'	Report
11	12 October 2013	Torquay United	Adams Park	3–2	3,466	Kuffour 28', Cowan-Hall 53', 77'	Report
12	19 October 2013	Bristol Rovers	Memorial Stadium	1–0	5,783	Kretzschmar 82'	Report
13	26 October 2013	Bury	Adams Park	1–2	3,350	Stewart 16'	Report
14	2 November 2013	Accrington Stanley	Crown Ground	1–1	1,268	Stewart 72'	Report
15	16 November 2013	Cheltenham Town	Adams Park	1–2	3,207	McClure 66'	Report
16	23 November 2013	Chesterfield	Proact Stadium	0–2	5,798		Report
17	26 November 2013	Exeter City	Adams Park	1–1	2,357	Craig 10'	Report
18	30 November 2013	Dagenham & Redbridge	Victoria Road	0–2	1,618		Report
19	4 December 2013	Portsmouth	Fratton Park	2–2	14,942	McClure 23', Stewart 90+5'	Report
Portsmouth match originally played on 22 October 2013, match abandoned at half time due to adverse weather
20	14 December 2013	Scunthorpe United	Adams Park	1–1	2,888	Johnson 90+7'	Report
21	21 December 2013	Northampton Town	Sixfields Stadium	4–1	4,353	Kuffour 1', Hause 14', Lewis 80', Morgan 85'	Report
22	26 December 2013	Newport County	Adams Park	0–1	3,513		Report
23	4 January 2014	AFC Wimbledon	Adams Park	0–3	3,513		Report
24	11 January 2014	Morecambe	Globe Arena	1–1	1,575	Cowan-Hall 41'	Report
25	18 January 2014	Oxford United	Adams Park	0–1	5,751		Report
26	25 January 2014	Mansfield Town	One Call Stadium	2–2	2,789	Lewis 9', Scowen 48'	Report
27	28 January 2014	Portsmouth	Adams Park	0–1	3,733		Report
28	1 February 2014	Bury	Gigg Lane	0–1	2,818		Report
29	8 February 2014	Accrington Stanley	Adams Park	0–0	3,073		Report
30	11 February 2014	Fleetwood Town	Adams Park	1–1	2,185	Lewis 45+1'	Report
Fleetwood Town match originally scheduled for 29 December 2013, match postponed due to frozen pitch.
31	22 February 2014	Chesterfield	Adams Park	1–0	3,356	Kretzschmar 35' (p)	Report
32	25 February 2014	Exeter City	St James Park	1–0	2,540	Kretzschmar 23'	Report
Exeter City match originally scheduled for 1 January 2014, match postponed due to waterlogged pitch.
33	1 March 2014	Southend United	Roots Hall	1–1	5,502	Bentley 70' (o.g.)	Report
34	8 March 2014	Hartlepool United	Adams Park	2–1	3,073	Morgan 52', McClure 70'	Report
35	11 March 2014	Plymouth Argyle	Adams Park	0–1	3,042		Report
36	15 March 2014	York City	Bootham Crescent	0–2	3,455		Report
37	18 March 2014	Cheltenham Town	Whaddon Road	1–1	2,267	Morgan 79' (p)	Report
Cheltenham Town match originally scheduled for 15 February 2014, match postponed due to waterlogged pitch.
38	22 March 2014	Rochdale	Adams Park	0–2	3,594		Report
39	25 March 2014	Burton Albion	Pirelli Stadium	0–1	1,784		Report
40	29 March 2014	Scunthorpe United	Glanford Park	0–0	3,867		Report
41	5 April 2014	Dagenham & Redbridge	Adams Park	2–0	3,103	Craig 47' (p), Kretzschmar 58'	Report
42	12 April 2014	Newport County	Rodney Parade	0–2	2,838		Report
43	18 April 2014	Northampton Town	Adams Park	1–1	7,004	Pierre 18'	Report
44	21 April 2014	Fleetwood Town	Highbury Stadium	0–1	2,711		Report
45	26 April 2014	Bristol Rovers	Adams Park	1–2	6,752	McClure 20'	Report
46	3 May 2014	Torquay United	Plainmoor	3–0	3,149	Wood 6', Craig 42' (p), McClure 62'	Report

=== FA Cup ===
Round	Date	Opponent	Venue	Result	Attendance	Goalscorers	Match Report
1	9 November 2013	Crewe Alexandra	Adams Park	1–1	1,929	Cowan-Hall 37'	Report
Replay	19 November 2013	Crewe Alexandra	Alexandra Stadium	2–0	1,695	Craig 50' (p), Doherty 70'	Report
2	7 December 2013	Preston North End	Adams Park	0–1	2,249		Report

=== League Cup ===
Round	Date	Opponent	Venue	Result	Attendance	Goalscorers	Match Report
1	6 August 2013	Leicester City	Adams Park	1–2	3,158	Kuffour 21'	Report

=== League Trophy ===
Round	Date	Opponent	Venue	Result	Attendance	Goalscorers	Match Report
1	3 September 2013	Exeter City	St James Park	2–0	1,654	McClure 30', Stewart 83'	Report
2	8 October 2013	Bristol City	Adams Park	2–1	1,279	Knott 9', Bloomfield 27'	Report
Area QF	12 November 2013	Swindon Town	County Ground	1–2	3,940	McClure 45'	Report

== Squad statistics ==
=== Appearances and goals ===
As of 20 March 2014

No.	Pos	Nat	Player	Total		League Two		FA Cup		League Cup		League Trophy	
No.	Pos	Nat	Player	Apps	Goals	Apps	Goals	Apps	Goals	Apps	Goals	Apps	Goals
1	GK	(England) ENG	Matt Ingram	53	0	46	0	3	0	1	0	3	0
2	DF	(Antigua and Barbuda) ANT	Marvin McCoy	40	0	33	0	3	0	1	0	3	0
3	DF	(England) ENG	Charles Dunne	12	0	9	0	1	0	1	0	1	0
4	MF	(England) ENG	Josh Scowen	42	1	37	1	2	0	1	0	2	0
5	DF	(England) ENG	Anthony Stewart	39	4	33	3	3	0	1	0	2	1
6	DF	(England) ENG	Leon Johnson	30	1	30	1	0	0	0	0	0	0
7	FW	(England) ENG	Dean Morgan	33	8	29	8	2	0	1	0	1	0
8	MF	(England) ENG	Stuart Lewis	43	3	36	3	3	0	1	0	3	0
9	MF	(England) ENG	Matt Spring	8	0	5	0	1	0	1	0	1	0
10	MF	(England) ENG	Matt Bloomfield	35	1	32	0	1	0	0	0	2	1
11	MF	(England) ENG	Sam Wood	49	2	43	2	3	0	0	0	3	0
12	FW	(England) ENG	Paris Cowan-Hall	30	5	25	4	3	1	1	0	1	0
13	GK	(England) ENG	Charlie Horlock	0	0	0	0	0	0	0	0	0	0
15	MF	(England) ENG	Anthony Jeffrey	11	0	11	0	0	0	0	0	0	0
16	FW	(England) ENG	Jon-Paul Pittman	11	0	10	0	0	0	1	0	0	0
17	FW	(England) ENG	Junior Morias	10	0	9	0	1	0	0	0	0	0
18	FW	(Ghana) GHA	Jo Kuffour	28	4	24	3	0	0	1	1	3	0
19	DF	(England) ENG	Aaron Pierre	8	1	8	1	0	0	0	0	0	0
20	FW	(Scotland) SCO	Steven Craig	33	5	27	4	3	1	1	0	2	0
21	MF	(England) ENG	Jesse Kewley-Graham	1	0	1	0	0	0	0	0	0	0
22	MF	(England) ENG	Max Kretzschmar	41	6	35	6	2	0	1	0	3	0
23	DF	(England) ENG	Nick Arnold	33	0	31	0	0	0	0	0	2	0
24	MF	(England) ENG	Lee Angol	0	0	0	0	0	0	0	0	0	0
25	DF	(England) ENG	Tommy Fletcher	1	0	0	0	0	0	0	0	1	0
27	FW	(England) ENG	Reece Styche	14	0	14	0	0	0	0	0	0	0
29	FW	(Northern Ireland) NIR	Matt McClure	40	9	35	7	3	0	0	0	2	2
30	DF	(Republic of Ireland) IRL	Gary Doherty	22	1	20	0	1	1	0	0	1	0
33	DF	(England) ENG	Danny Rowe	7	0	7	0	0	0	0	0	0	0
Players left the club before the end of the season:
19	DF	(England) ENG	Kortney Hause	20	1	14	1	2	0	1	0	3	0
28	MF	(England) ENG	Billy Knott	23	2	17	1	3	0	0	0	3	1
28	DF	(England) ENG	Jordan Mustoe	3	0	3	0	0	0	0	0	0	0
28	MF	(England) ENG	Sam Togwell	4	0	4	0	0	0	0	0	0	0

=== Goalscorers ===
Goals	Name	League Two	FA Cup	League Cup	League Trophy	Total
9	Matt McClure	7	0	0	2	9
8	Dean Morgan	8	0	0	0	8
6	Max Kretzschmar	6	0	0	0	6
5	Paris Cowan-Hall	4	1	0	0	5
=	Steven Craig	4	1	0	0	5
3	Jo Kuffour	3	0	1	0	4
=	Anthony Stewart	3	0	0	1	4
3	Stuart Lewis	3	0	0	0	3
2	Billy Knott *	1	0	0	1	2
=	Sam Wood	2	0	0	0	2
1	Matt Bloomfield	0	0	0	1	1
=	Gary Doherty	0	1	0	0	1
=	Kortney Hause *	1	0	0	0	1
=	Leon Johnson	1	0	0	0	1
=	Aaron Pierre	1	0	0	0	1
=	Josh Scowen	1	0	0	0	1
=	Own goals	1	0	0	0	1
TOTALS		46	3	1	5	55

*Hause and Knott left the club before the end of the season

=== Disciplinary record ===
Number	Position	Name	League Two		FA Cup		League Cup		League Trophy		Total	
Number	Position	Name	Yellow card	Red card	Yellow card	Red card	Yellow card	Red card	Yellow card	Red card	Yellow card	Red card
1	GK	Matt Ingram	2	0	0	0	0	0	0	0	2	0
2	DF	Marvin McCoy	4	0	1	0	0	0	1	0	5	0
3	DF	Charles Dunne	2	2	0	0	0	0	1	0	3	2
4	MF	Josh Scowen	8	1	1	0	0	0	0	0	9	1
5	DF	Anthony Stewart	2	2	0	0	0	0	0	0	2	2
6	DF	Leon Johnson	4	0	0	0	0	0	0	0	4	0
7	FW	Dean Morgan	5	0	0	0	0	0	0	0	5	0
8	MF	Stuart Lewis	3	1	0	0	1	0	0	0	4	1
9	MF	Matthew Spring	1	0	0	0	0	0	1	0	2	0
10	MF	Matt Bloomfield	4	0	0	0	0	0	0	0	4	0
11	MF	Sam Wood	4	0	0	0	0	0	2	0	6	0
12	FW	Paris Cowan-Hall	1	0	1	0	0	0	1	0	3	0
16	FW	Jon-Paul Pittman	1	0	0	0	0	0	0	0	1	0
17	FW	Junior Morias	1	0	0	0	0	0	0	0	1	0
18	FW	Jo Kuffour	1	0	0	0	0	0	0	0	1	0
19	DF	Kortney Hause	1	0	0	0	0	0	0	0	1	0
19	DF	Aaron Pierre	2	0	0	0	0	0	0	0	2	0
20	FW	Steven Craig	2	1	0	0	0	0	1	0	3	1
22	MF	Max Kretzschmar	2	0	1	0	0	0	0	0	3	0
23	MF	Nick Arnold	4	0	0	0	0	0	1	0	5	0
27	FW	Reece Styche	1	0	0	0	0	0	0	0	1	0
28	DF	Jordan Mustoe	1	0	0	0	0	0	0	0	1	0
28	MF	Billy Knott	4	0	0	0	0	0	0	0	4	0
29	FW	Matt McClure	6	0	0	0	0	0	0	0	6	0
30	DF	Gary Doherty	4	0	0	0	0	0	0	0	4	0
TOTALS			70	7	4	0	1	0	8	0	83	7

== Transfers ==
Players transferred in
Date	Pos.	Name	From	Fee	Ref.
23 May 2013	GK	Charlie Horlock	(England) Stevenage	Free Transfer	
27 June 2013	FW	Jon-Paul Pittman	(England) Oxford United	Free Transfer	
9 July 2013	DF	Tommy Fletcher	(England) Cheshunt	Free Transfer	
22 July 2013	FW	Steven Craig	(Scotland) Partick Thistle	Free Transfer	
23 January 2014	MF	Anthony Jeffrey	(England) Arsenal	Free Transfer	
Players transferred out
12 June 2013	DF	Dave Winfield	(England) Shrewsbury Town	Undisclosed	
26 June 2013	FW	Joel Grant	(England) Yeovil Town	Contract Expiry	
24 August 2013	DF	Charles Dunne	(England) Blackpool	Undisclosed	
31 January 2014	DF	Kortney Hause	(England) Wolverhampton Wanderers	Undisclosed	
Players loaned in
Date from	Pos.	Name	From	Date to	Ref.
1 July 2013	MF	Nick Arnold	(England) Reading	30 June 2014	
20 August 2013	MF	Billy Knott	(England) Sunderland	29 January 2014	
24 August 2013	DF	Charles Dunne	(England) Blackpool	30 June 2014	
17 January 2014	DF	Jordan Mustoe	(England) Wigan Athletic	17 February 2014	
24 January 2014	FW	Reece Styche	(England) Forest Green	30 June 2014	
28 February 2014	DF	Aaron Pierre	(England) Brentford	30 June 2014	
14 March 2014	MF	Sam Togwell	(England) Chesterfield	9 April 2014	
27 March 2014	DF	Danny Rowe	(England) Rotherham United	30 June 2014	
Players loaned out
30 July 2013	MF	Jesse Kewley-Graham	(England) Havant & Waterlooville	20 December 2013	
17 August 2013	MF	Lee Angol	(England) Hendon	15 September 2013	
17 August 2013	FW	Junior Morias	(England) Hendon	15 September 2013	
17 August 2013	GK	Charlie Horlock	(England) Hendon	2 January 2014	
5 October 2013	MF	Lee Angol	(England) Maidenhead United	5 November 2013	
24 January 2014	MF	Lee Angol	(England) Boreham Wood	24 February 2014	
24 January 2014	FW	Junior Morias	(England) Boreham Wood	24 February 2014	

- Charles Dunne agreed a transfer to Blackpool on 24 August 2013, although he immediately returned to Wycombe on a season-long loan.

== See also ==
- 2013–14 in English football
- 2013–14 Football League Two
- Wycombe Wanderers F.C.
- Gareth Ainsworth
- Adams Park
