= 2010–11 Wycombe Wanderers F.C. season =

Wycombe Wanderers
2010–11 season
- Chairman: Ivor Beeks
- Manager: Gary Waddock
- League Two: 3rd (Promoted)
- FA Cup: Third Round
- League Cup: First Round
- Top goalscorer: League: Scott Rendell (14 goals); All: Scott Rendell (16 goals)
- Highest home attendance: 8,567 (vs Southend)
- Lowest home attendance: 3,345 (vs Barnet)

The 2010–11 Football League Two is Wycombe Wanderers F.C.'s seventeenth season of League football. This article shows statistics of the club's players in the season, and also lists all matches that the club has played during the season.

== League table ==
Pos	Team	Pld	W	D	L	GF	GA	GD	Pts	Promotion, qualification or relegation
1	Chesterfield (C, P)	46	24	14	8	85	51	+34	86	Promotion to League One
2	Bury (P)	46	23	12	11	82	50	+32	81	Promotion to League One
3	Wycombe Wanderers (P)	46	22	14	10	69	50	+19	80	Promotion to League One
4	Shrewsbury Town	46	22	13	11	72	49	+23	79	Qualification to League Two play-offs
5	Accrington Stanley	46	18	19	9	73	55	+18	73	Qualification to League Two play-offs

Updated to match(es) played on 28 May 2011. Source: The Football League
Rules for classification: 1) points; 2) goal difference; 3) number of goals scored.
(C) Champions; (P) Promoted

== Match results ==
=== Legend ===
Win	Draw	Loss

=== Friendlies ===
Game	Date	Opponent	Venue	Result	Attendance	Goalscorers	Ref.
1	14 July 2010	Chesham United	The Meadow	3–0	544	Strevens 39', Pittman 42', Murtagh 85'	
2	17 July 2010	Hayes & Yeading United	Church Road	3–1		Betsy 8', 37', Rendell 12'	
3	20 July 2010	Brentford	Griffin Park	1–1	984	Betsy 42'	
4	21 July 2010	Uxbridge	Honeycroft	6–3		Green 27', Bailey 55', McClure 66', 77', 84', 88'	
5	24 July 2010	Reading	Adams Park	1–2		Pittman 8'	
6	27 July 2010	Burnham	The Gore	2–1		Weemes 27', Green 47'	
7	29 July 2010	Chelsea	Adams Park	5–1		Rendell 24', Strevens 36', Pittman 76', 77', 79'	
8	31 July 2010	Farnborough	Cherrywood Road	4–2		Betsy 4', Strevens 20', Phillips 54', Pittman 58'	

=== Football League Two ===
Game	Date	Opponent	Venue	Result	Attendance	Goalscorers	Ref.
1	7 August 2010	Morecambe	Adams Park	2–0	4,016	Rendell 36' (Pen), Pittman 84'	
2	14 August 2010	Stockport County	Edgeley Park	0–0	3,837		
3	21 August 2010	Oxford United	Adams Park	0–0	6,983		
4	28 August 2010	Northampton Town	Sixfields Stadium	1–1	4,202	Sandell 39'	
5	4 September 2010	Accrington Stanley	Crown Ground	1–1	1,610	Bloomfield 67'	
6	11 September 2010	Macclesfield Town	Adams Park	1–2	3,739	Rendell 65' (Pen)	
7	18 September 2010	Aldershot Town	Recreation Ground	0–0	3,772		
8	25 September 2010	Shrewsbury Town	Adams Park	2–2	4,208	Sandell 63', Montrose 90+3'	
9	28 September 2010	Barnet	Adams Park	4–2	3,518	Sandell 19', 41' Montrose 24', Bloomfield 85'	
10	4 October 2010	Stevenage	Broadhall Way	2–0	3,384	Betsy 35', Beavon 45'	
11	9 October 2010	Burton Albion	Pirelli Stadium	2–1	3,042	Ainsworth 16', Sandell 41'	
12	16 October 2010	Chesterfield	Adams Park	1–2	5,211	Strevens 64'	
13	23 October 2010	Rotherham United	Don Valley Stadium	4–3	3,651	Betsy 9', Bloomfield 18', Strevens 45+1', Rendell (Pen) 84'	
14	30 October 2010	Lincoln City	Adams Park	2–2	4,325	Betsy 1', Davies 38'	
15	2 November 2010	Gillingham	Priestfield Stadium	2–0	4,076	Ainsworth 23', Betsy 49'	
16	13 November 2010	Bradford City	Adams Park	1–0	4,077	Betsy 82'	
17	20 November 2010	Port Vale	Vale Park	1–2	5,587	Winfield 16'	
18	23 November 2010	Torquay United	Adams Park	1–3	2,273	Beavon 7'	
19	11 December 2010	Bury	Adams Park	1–0	3,673	Rendell 69'	
20	26 December 2010	Hereford United	Adams Park	2–1	3,792	Ainsworth 41', Strevens 87'	
21	1 January 2011	Cheltenham Town	Whaddon Road	2–1	3,326	Beavon 44', Ainsworth 58'	
22	3 January 2011	Gillingham	Adams Park	1–0	4,617	Winfield 64'	
23	8 January 2011	Crewe Alexandra	Alexandra Stadium	0–3	3,727		
24	15 January 2011	Lincoln City	Sincil Bank	2–1	2,890	Sandell 19', 39'	
25	22 January 2011	Rotherham United	Adams Park	1–0	4,181	Ainsworth 28'	
26	1 February 2011	Cheltenham Town	Adams Park	2–1	3,409	Strevens 28', Ainsworth 54'	
27	5 February 2011	Port Vale	Adams Park	1–1	4,173	Donnelly 57'	
28	12 February 2011	Bradford City	Valley Parade	0–1	10,897		
29	15 February 2011	Southend	Roots Hall	2–3	4,499	Pittman 31', Rendell (Pen) 89'	
30	19 February 2011	Accrington Stanley	Adams Park	1–2	3,747	Rendell 52'	
31	22 February 2011	Burton Albion	Adams Park	4–1	3,345	Lewis 10', 40', Montrose 30', Rendell (Pen) 63'	
32	26 February 2011	Macclesfield Town	Moss Rose	1–0	1,622	Ainsworth 39'	
33	1 March 2011	Chesterfield	B2net Stadium	1–4	6,392	Pittman 81'	
34	5 March 2011	Aldershot Town	Adams Park	2–2	4,421	Foster 44', Betsy 48'	
35	8 March 2011	Barnet	Underhill Stadium	1–0	1,520	Westwood 45+2'	
36	12 March 2011	Stevenage	Adams Park	0–1	4,453		
37	19 March 2011	Shrewsbury Town	New Meadow	1–1	5,886	Ainsworth 50'	
38	26 March 2011	Morecambe	Globe Arena	3–0	1,940	Rendell (pen) 35', 45+1', Ainsworth 37'	
39	2 April 2011	Stockport County	Adams Park	2–0	6,836	Montrose 10', Rendell (pen) 41'	
40	5 April 2011	Hereford United	Edgar Street	0–0	1,633		
41	9 April 2011	Oxford United	Kassam Stadium	2–2	9,309	Rendell 63', Pittman 66'	
42	16 April 2011	Northampton Town	Adams Park	2–2	5,161	Donnelly 51', Johnson 82'	
43	22 April 2011	Torquay United	Plainmoor	0–0	4,009		
44	25 April 2011	Crewe Alexandra	Adams Park	2–0	4,615	Rendell 42', (pen) 45+2'	
45	30 April 2011	Bury	Gigg Lane	3–1	6,238	Ainsworth 20', Strevens 63', 88'	
46	7 May 2011	Southend United	Adams Park	3–1	8,567	Donnelly 20', Strevens 26', Rendell 53'	

=== FA Cup ===
Round	Date	Opponent	Venue	Result	Attendance	Goalscorers	Ref.
1	6 November 2010	Hayes & Yeading	Church Road	2–1	1,426	Beavon 61', Ainsworth 90+5'	
2	27 November 2010	Chelmsford City	Adams Park	3–1	1,426	Rendell 22', 73', Beavon 84'	
3	11 January 2011	Hereford Utd	Adams Park	0–1	2,353		

=== League Cup ===
Round	Date	Opponent	Venue	Result	Attendance	Goalscorers	Ref.
1	10 August 2010	Millwall	Adams Park	1–2	1,955	Strevens 76'	

=== Football League Trophy ===
Round	Date	Opponent	Venue	Result	Attendance	Goalscorers	Ref.
2	5 October 2010	Colchester United	Colchester Community Stadium	2–0	2,379	Betsy 75', Davies 85'	
3	9 November 2010	Bristol Rovers	Adams Park	3–6	1,519	Rendell 58', 83', 89' (1 Pen)	

== Squad statistics ==
Appearances for competitive matches only

No.	Pos.	Name	League		FA Cup		League Cup		Total		Discipline	
No.	Pos.	Name	Apps	Goals	Apps	Goals	Apps	Goals	Apps	Goals	Yellow card	Red card
1	GK	(England) Nikki Bull	44	0	3	0	1	0	48	0	2	0
2	DF	(England) Danny Foster	35 (1)	1	1	0	1	0	37 (1)	1	4	0
3	DF	(England) Andy Sandell	28 (2)	7	3	0	0 (1)	0	31 (3)	7	0	0
4	DF	(Republic of Ireland) Alan Bennett	16 (1)	0	1	0	1	0	18 (1)	0	0	0
5	DF	(England) Dave Winfield	32 (3)	2	2	0	0	0	34 (3)	2	12	1
6	DF	(England) Leon Johnson	20 (1)	1	1	0	1	0	22 (1)	1	3	0
7	MF	(England) Gareth Ainsworth	37 (4)	9	3	1	0	0	40 (4)	10	6	0
8	MF	(England) Keiran Murtagh	1 (6)	0	0	0	1	0	2 (6)	0	0	0
9	FW	(England) Scott Rendell	22 (13)	13	1 (2)	2	1	0	24 (15)	15	2	0
10	MF	(England) Matt Bloomfield	30 (3)	3	2	0	0 (1)	0	32 (4)	3	7	0
11	MF	(England) Kevin Betsy	39 (4)	6	3	0	1	0	43 (4)	6	6	0
12	FW	(England) Ben Strevens	34 (4)	4	1 (2)	0	0 (1)	1	35 (6)	5	5	0
15	MF	(England) Stuart Green	0	0	0	0	0	0	0	0	0	0
16	FW	(United States) Jon-Paul Pittman	6 (12)	4	0	0	1	0	7 (12)	4	1	0
17	MF	(England) Lewis Montrose	27 (8)	4	1 (1)	0	1	0	29 (9)	4	9	0
18	MF	(England) Matt Phillips	2 (2)	0	0	0	1	0	3 (2)	0	0	0
18	MF	(England) Stuart Lewis	22 (1)	2	2	0	0	0	24 (1)	2	5	0
19	DF	(England) Marvin McCoy	18 (3)	0	1	0	1	0	20 (3)	0	0	0
20	FW	(England) Stuart Beavon	30 (6)	3	3	2	0	0	33 (6)	5	1	0
21	MF	(England) Josh Parker	0 (1)	0	0	0	0	0	0 (1)	0	0	0
22	MF	(Republic of Ireland) Scott Davies	5 (3)	1	1	0	0	0	6 (3)	1	2	0
22	MF	(England) Scott Donnelly	9 (7)	2	1	0	0	0	10 (7)	2	3	0
23	DF	(England) Chris Westwood	24 (3)	1	3	0	0	0	27 (3)	1	2	0
24	FW	(Republic of Ireland) Rob Kiernan	2	0	0	0	0	0	2	0	1	0
25	FW	(England) Dan Fitchett	0	0	0	0	0	0	0	0	0	0
26	MF	(England) Jerome Federico	0 (1)	0	0	0	0	0	0 (1)	0	0	0
28	MF	(England) Ian Westlake	0	0	0	0	0	0	0	0	0	0
29	FW	(Northern Ireland) Matt McClure	0 (8)	0	0 (1)	0	0	0	0 (9)	0	0	0
30	MF	(England) Kadeem Harris	0	0	0 (1)	0	0	0	0 (1)	0	0	0
32	GK	(England) Steve Arnold	0	0	0	0	0	0	0	0	0	0

== Transfers in ==
Date	Position	Name	Club From	Fee
7 June 2010	GK	Nikki Bull	Brentford	Free
25 June 2010	DF	Danny Foster	Brentford	Free
25 June 2010	FW	Ben Strevens	Brentford	Free
30 June 2010	MF	Keiran Murtagh	Yeovil Town	Free
1 July 2010	FW	Scott Rendell	Peterborough United	Undisclosed
23 July 2010	DF	Alan Bennett	Brentford	Free
27 July 2010	DF	Marvin McCoy	Wealdstone	Undisclosed
3 August 2010	DF	Dave Winfield	Aldershot Town	£25,000

== Transfers out ==
Date	Position	Name	Club To	Fee
12 May 2010	MF	Dean Keates	Wrexham	Free
27 May 2010	DF	Luke Oliver	Bradford City	Free
28 June 2010	DF	John Mousinho	Stevenage	Free
30 June 2010	DF	Craig Woodman	Brentford	Undisclosed
1 July 2010	MF	Kevin McLeod	None	Released
1 July 2010	MF	Joe Cobb	None	Released
13 July 2010	FW	Matt Harrold	Shrewsbury Town	Free
14 July 2010	DF	Adam Hinshelwood	None	Retirement
16 July 2010	MF	Lewwis Spence	Rushden & Diamonds	Free
26 July 2010	GK	Scott Shearer	Wrexham	Free
30 July 2010	DF	Lewis Hunt	Bradford City	Free
31 August 2010	MF	Matt Phillips	Blackpool	£325,000

== See also ==
- 2010–11 in English football
- Wycombe Wanderers F.C.
