= Charles Dunne =

English football player (born 1993)

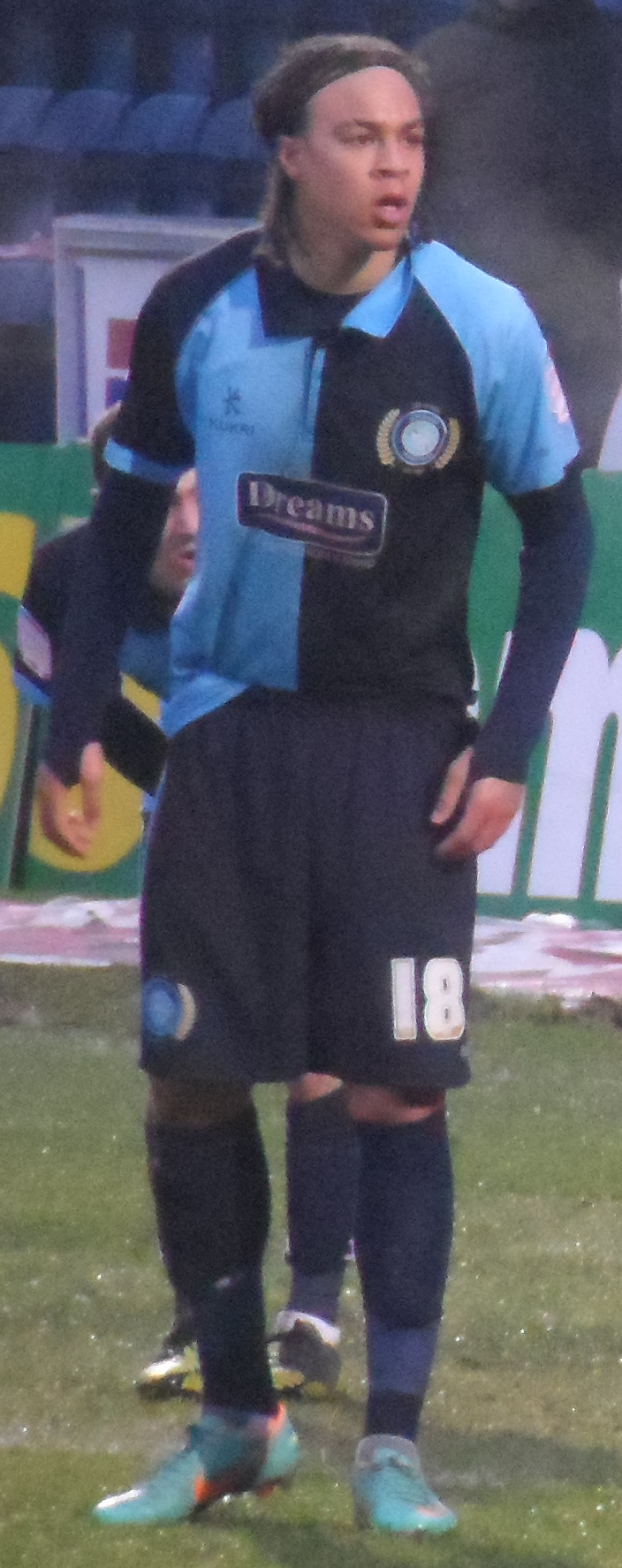
- Dunne playing for Wycombe Wanderers in 2013

Personal information
- Full name: Charles Dunne
- Date of birth: 13 February 1993 (age 33)
- Place of birth: Lambeth, England
- Height: 1.77 m (5 ft 9 1/2 in)
- Position: Defender

Youth career
- 2010–2011: Wycombe Wanderers

Senior career*
Years	Team	Apps	(Gls)
2011–2013	Wycombe Wanderers	44	(0)
2011	→ Staines Town (loan)	5	(1)
2013–2016	Blackpool	26	(0)
2013–2014	→ Wycombe Wanderers (loan)	6	(0)
2016	→ Crawley Town (loan)	12	(0)
2016–2017	Oldham Athletic	14	(0)
2017–2021	Motherwell	60	(0)
2021–2025	St Mirren	80	(1)
2025–2026	Coleraine	46	(2)

International career
2013	Republic of Ireland U21	1	(0)
- * Club domestic league appearances and goals as of 15 October 2026

Charles Dunne (born 13 February 1993) is a professional footballer who plays as a defender.

He has previously played for Wycombe Wanderers, Staines Town, Blackpool, Crawley Town, Oldham Athletic, Motherwell, St Mirren and Coleraine.

== Club career ==
=== Wycombe Wanderers ===
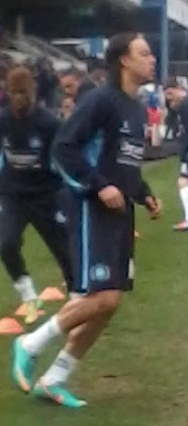
Dunne training for Wycombe Wanderers ahead of a match against Bristol Rovers.

Dunne started his youth career at Orpington youth in the Kent League where he played under ex-pro Dave Smith. He made 63 appearances scoring 16 goals between 2007 and 2010. He then came through the ranks at Wycombe Wanderers after joining them in 2010 on youth contract terms, and in September 2011, he signed a two-year professional contract.

The following month he was loaned to Staines Town until the end of the season, on a youth contract. Dunne made his Staines Town debut on 22 October 2011, playing the whole game, in a 1–0 loss against Woking He scored his first goal for the club, in a 4–1 loss against Sutton United on 5 November 2011. He returned to Wycombe Wanderers in November, along with teammate Jesse Kewley-Graham, to boost the club's squad options. Dunne made his professional debut for Wycombe Wanderers on 21 April 2012, in a 2–1 away loss against Charlton Athletic, coming on as a substitute for Grant Basey in the 85th minute. He made his second appearance the following weekend as Wycombe lost 4–3 at home against Notts County, coming on for Joel Grant in the 84th minute. This defeat relegated Wycombe into League Two, after a single season in League One. He played the majority of the final game of the season in front of a sell out at Hillsborough, replacing injured Grant Basey as Wycombe succumbed to a 2–0 defeat against Sheffield Wednesday.

Following the club's academy demise, Dunne was promoted to the first team squad at the start of the 2012–13 season. He made his first professional start, in the first round of the League Cup, in a 1–0 defeat to Watford on 11 August 2012. Following this, Dunne had a handful of first team appearances for the side, playing in the left-back position for most of the season and became a first team regular. Throughout the January transfer window, Dunne was linked with a move away from the club, however the club denied there was any deal for him, stating that they had received no bids for the player. In a 0–0 draw against Northampton Town on 16 April 2013, Dunne was named Man of the Match for his display and was praised by manager Gareth Ainsworth. Despite being sidelined with injuries, suspension and being dropped to the substitutes bench, Dunne finished the 2012–13 season, making forty two appearances and was awarded the Most Improved Young Player of the Season.

In the 2013–14 season, Dunne continued to remain in the first team before being sent-off in the second half, in a 2–2 draw against Oxford United on 24 August 2013. After the club decided against appealing his sending-off, it wasn't until 5 October 2013 when Dunne returned to the first team against Burton Albion, only to be sent-off for a second bookable offence, in a 2–1 loss. After the match, Dunne apologised for his sending off. He then suffered a broken leg that kept him out for the rest of the season.

=== Blackpool ===
On 24 August 2013, Dunne signed for Blackpool for an undisclosed fee on a three-year contract. Under the terms of the contract he was returned on-loan to Wycombe for the remainder of the 2013–14 season.

In the 2014–15 season, Dunne was expected to be included in Blackpool's first team, as he was among eight players contracted at the club and was given the number eighteen shirt ahead of the new season. However, at the start of the season, Dunne was dropped from the first team to the substitutes bench in favor of Joan Oriol before being recalled by manager Lee Clark in early-November. Dunne made his Blackpool debut on 1 November 2014, against Ipswich Town, making his first start before being substituted in the 65th minute, in a 2–0 loss. From that moment on, Dunne established himself in the left-back position for most of the season. However, he was sent-off in the 44th minute, in a 4–0 loss against Brentford on 24 February 2015. After serving a three match suspension, Dunne regained his first team place for the rest of the season and went on to make 23 appearances in all competitions.

In the 2015–16 season, Dunne struggled to regain his first team place, spending time on the substitutes bench and dropping out of the first team squad. By November, Dunne kept his first team place for matches against Bradford City and Doncaster Rovers before dropping out the side once more. After being told by Blackpool that he would be loaned out, Dunne joined Crawley Town on a one-month loan on 1 March 2016. He made his Crawley debut on the same day, in a 2–0 win over Newport County. Having helped the side keep four clean sheets in six games, his loan spell was extended until the end of the season. After making 12 appearances, Dunne returned to his parent club before being released by Blackpool at the end of the 2015–16 season.

=== Oldham Athletic ===
On 12 August 2016, Dunne signed a short-term deal with Oldham Athletic, having spent time on trial at the club.

Four days after signing, Dunne made his debut, playing the whole game, in a 0–0 draw against Northampton Town. He appeared regularly as a left-back in the first team from the start of the season. As a result, his short-term deal was extended until January. However, his first team appearances were soon limited with a pelvic injury suffered during a 2–0 loss against Sheffield United on Boxing Day. By this time his contract with the club had been extended until the end of the season. The injury would eventually keep him out for the rest of the season.

At the end of the 2016–17 season, having made nineteen appearances in all competitions, Dunne was released by the club.

=== Motherwell ===
On 30 June 2017, Dunne signed for Motherwell on a one-year deal. He scored on his debut as Motherwell won 4–0 against Greenock Morton in the group stages of the Scottish League Cup. In August 2017, Dunne was sent off in consecutive matches, away to Ross County in the League Cup, then at St Johnstone in the Scottish Premiership. Motherwell appealed both decisions, along with the red card shown to goalkeeper Trevor Carson in the St Johnstone match. They were successful with one of those appeals, with the second of Dunne's red cards being overturned. That season Motherwell reached the 2017 Scottish League Cup Final and the 2018 Scottish Cup Final, Dunne playing in both matches which ended in a 2–0 loss to Celtic on each occasion.

Having missed four months of the 2018–19 season with a groin injury, in September 2019 Dunne suffered a similar problem which was found to require surgery and at least four months out; he underwent a rehabilitation programme across the winter (alongside teammate David Turnbull who was recovering from a knee operation) but was unable to resume playing before the season was halted in March 2020 due to the COVID-19 pandemic in Scotland. Three months later he signed an extension of his contract with the club to run to the end of the calendar year in order to prove his fitness.

On 27 June 2020, Dunne signed a new short-term contract with Motherwell, until December 2020, before extending his contract with the club again on 1 February 2021 until the end of the 2020–21 season.

=== St Mirren ===
Dunne signed a two-year contract with St Mirren in June 2021. St Mirren announced in May 2023 that Dunne would be leaving at the end of that contract, but a few weeks later he signed a one-year contract with the club. Dunne was released by the club at the end of the season; however, in September 2024, St Mirren signed Dunne, on a new contract until January 2025, due to injuries in the squad.

=== Coleraine ===
In February 2025 he joined Coleraine. He was released at the end of the 2025–26 season.

== International career ==
Though he was born in Lambeth, England, Dunne announced his intention to apply for an Irish citizenship, as he qualifies to play for the Republic of Ireland through his Galway-born mother.

In August 2013, Dunne was called into the Republic of Ireland U21 side to face the Faroe Islands in a UEFA European Under-21 Championship qualifier, however, he did not play. After being called up by the national team on two occasions, Dunne made his only appearance for Republic of Ireland U21 on 15 November 2013, where he played 27 minutes after coming on as a second-half substitute, in a 5–2 win over Faroe Islands.

== Career statistics ==
As of 28 December 2020

Club	Season	League			National Cup		League Cup		Other		Total	
Club	Season	Division	Apps	Goals	Apps	Goals	Apps	Goals	Apps	Goals	Apps	Goals
Wycombe Wanderers	2011–12	League One	3	0	0	0	0	0	0	0	3	0
Wycombe Wanderers	2012–13	League Two	38	0	1	0	1	0	2 (Note: Appearances in the Football League Trophy)	0	42	0
Wycombe Wanderers	2013–14	League Two	3	0	0	0	1	0	0	0	4	0
Wycombe Wanderers	Total		44	0	1	0	2	0	2	0	49	0
Staines Town (loan)	2011–12	Conference South	5	1	1	0	0	0	0	0	6	1
Blackpool	2013–14	Championship	0	0	0	0	0	0	0	0	0	0
Blackpool	2014–15	Championship	22	0	1	0	0	0	0	0	23	0
Blackpool	2015–16	League One	4	0	1	0	0	0	2	0	7	0
Blackpool	Total		26	0	2	0	0	0	2	0	30	0
Wycombe Wanderers (loan)	2013–14	League Two	6	0	1	0	0	0	1	0	8	0
Crawley Town (loan)	2015–16	League Two	12	0	0	0	0	0	0	0	12	0
Oldham Athletic	2016–17	League One	14	0	1	0	1	0	3 (Note: Appearances in the EFL Trophy)	0	19	0
Motherwell	2017–18	Scottish Premiership	34	0	5	0	6	1	0	0	45	1
Motherwell	2018–19	Scottish Premiership	23	0	1	0	2	0	0	0	26	0
Motherwell	2019–20	Scottish Premiership	3	0	0	0	4	0	0	0	7	0
Motherwell	2020–21	Scottish Premiership	0	0	0	0	0	0	0	0	0	0
Motherwell	Total		60	0	6	0	12	1	0	0	78	1
Career total			167	1	12	0	15	1	8	0	202	2
