= Matt Ingram =

English footballer (born 1993)

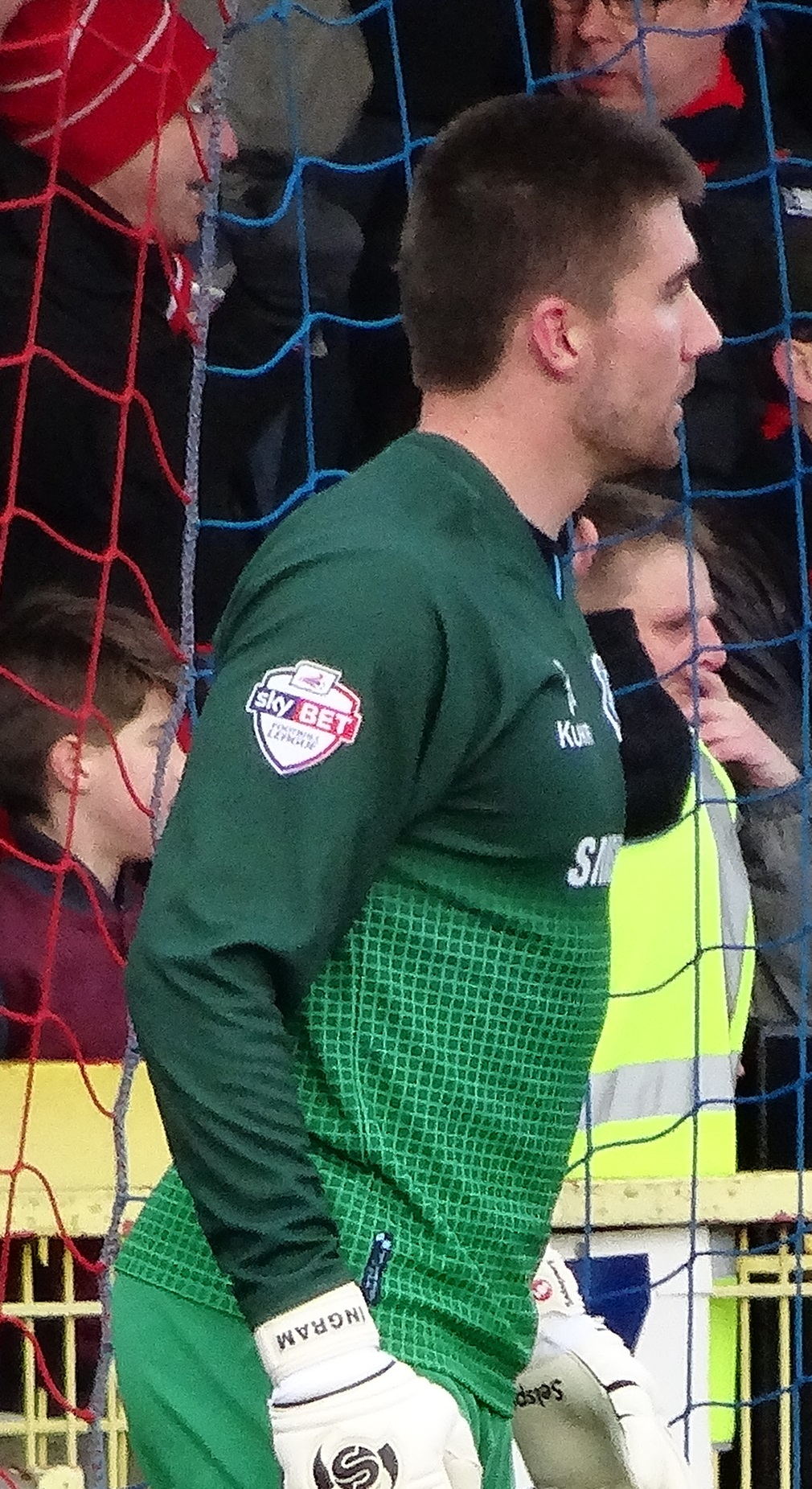
- Ingram playing for Wycombe Wanderers in 2014

Personal information
- Full name: Matthew Robert Ingram
- Date of birth: 18 December 1993 (age 32)
- Place of birth: High Wycombe, England
- Height: 6 ft 3 in (1.91 m)
- Position: Goalkeeper

Team information
- Current team: West Bromwich Albion
- Number: 13

Youth career
- –2010: Wycombe Wanderers

Senior career*
Years	Team	Apps	(Gls)
2010–2016	Wycombe Wanderers	124	(0)
2012	→ Lewes (loan)		
2012	→ Hayes & Yeading United (loan)	4	(0)
2012–2013	→ Oxford City (loan)	17	(0)
2016–2019	Queens Park Rangers	10	(0)
2017–2018	→ Northampton Town (loan)	20	(0)
2018	→ Wycombe Wanderers (loan)	1	(0)
2019–2024	Hull City	100	(0)
2022	→ Luton Town (loan)	2	(0)
2024–2026	Oxford United	1	(0)
2026–	West Bromwich Albion	0	(0)
- * Club domestic league appearances and goals as of 17:05, 3 May 2025 (UTC)

Matthew Robert Ingram (born 18 December 1993) is an English professional footballer who plays as a goalkeeper for EFL Championship club West Bromwich Albion. He has previously played for Wycombe Wanderers, Lewes, Hayes & Yeading United, Oxford City, Northampton Town, Queens Park Rangers, Hull City and Oxford United.

== Career ==
=== Wycombe Wanderers ===
Ingram was born in High Wycombe, Buckinghamshire, and attended John Hampden Grammar School. Whilst still a first-year scholar, was called up to the first-team squad for the League Two match against Shrewsbury Town on 25 September 2010, appearing on the substitutes' bench. He was also selected for an England goalkeeping training camp in January 2011, and was the only representative from a League Two club to be included. A work experience spell with Isthmian League Premier Division club Lewes followed in early 2012, then in May 2012, Ingram signed his first professional contract, which was subsequently extended to run until the summer of 2015. Loan spells at Conference South club Hayes & Yeading United and Conference North club Oxford City followed during the 2012–13 season, following which the recall by Tottenham Hotspur of loanee keeper Jordan Archer saw Ingram make his first-team debut against Accrington Stanley on 29 March 2013.

Ingram began the 2013–14 season as Wycombe's first-choice goalkeeper. In the first competitive match of the season, Ingram kept a clean sheet as Wycombe beat Morecambe 1–0.

Ingram was voted the highest ranked goalkeeper in League Two in The Football League Awards for the 2014–15 season.

=== Queens Park Rangers ===
Ingram signed for Championship club Queens Park Rangers on 22 January 2016 on a four-and-a-half-year contract for an undisclosed fee. He rejoined Wycombe Wanderers on 15 November 2018 on a seven-day emergency loan as cover for the injured Ryan Allsop and Yves Ma-Kalambay.

=== Hull City ===
Ingram signed for Championship club Hull City on 25 June 2019 on a three-year contract with the option of a further year for an undisclosed fee. He made his debut in the first round of the EFL Cup in a 3–0 away win against Tranmere Rovers.

Ingram joined Championship club Luton Town on 1 May 2022 on an emergency seven-day loan as cover for the injured James Shea. He made his debut the following day against table-topping Fulham with Luton losing the match 7–0. With Luton reaching the play-off stage the loan spell was extended to 18 May, Ingram having to delay his honeymoon in doing so. He played in both legs of the play-off semi-final, in which Luton were beaten 2–1 on aggregate by Huddersfield Town.

On 18 May 2022, Hull exercised an option for an additional year on Ingram's contract. On 16 June, he signed a new three-year contract, with the club holding an option for a further year.

=== Oxford United ===
On 19 July 2024, Ingram signed for Oxford United for an undisclosed fee. On 19 June 2025, the club said he had signed a new deal. In his two seasons at the club, he was second-choice keeper behind Jamie Cumming, played just seven times for the first team, and only once in a league fixture, a 3–3 draw with Swansea City on the final day of the 2024–25 season after Oxford had avoided relegation.

=== West Bromwich Albion ===
On 24 June 2026, Ingram signed for West Brom on a two-year deal. He made his debut for the club in a 3–2 defeat to Newcastle United in the EFL Cup on 26 August 2026.

== Career statistics ==
As of match played 26 August 2026

Appearances and goals by club, season and competition
Club	Season	League			FA Cup		League Cup		Other		Total	
Club	Season	Division	Apps	Goals	Apps	Goals	Apps	Goals	Apps	Goals	Apps	Goals
Wycombe Wanderers	2010–11	League Two	0	0	0	0	0	0	0	0	0	0
Wycombe Wanderers	2011–12	League One	0	0	0	0	0	0	0	0	0	0
Wycombe Wanderers	2012–13	League Two	8	0	—		0	0	0	0	8	0
Wycombe Wanderers	2013–14	League Two	46	0	3	0	1	0	3 (Note: Appearances in EFL Trophy)	0	53	0
Wycombe Wanderers	2014–15	League Two	46	0	2	0	1	0	1	0	50	0
Wycombe Wanderers	2015–16	League Two	24	0	3	0	1	0	1	0	29	0
Wycombe Wanderers	Total		124	0	8	0	3	0	5	0	140	0
Hayes & Yeading United (loan)	2012–13	Conference South	4	0	—		—		—		4	0
Oxford City (loan)	2012–13	Conference North	17	0	—		—		3 (Note: Appearances in FA Trophy)	0	20	0
Queens Park Rangers	2015–16	Championship	4	0	—		—		—		4	0
Queens Park Rangers	2016–17	Championship	0	0	1	0	3	0	—		4	0
Queens Park Rangers	2017–18	Championship	2	0	0	0	2	0	—		4	0
Queens Park Rangers	2018–19	Championship	4	0	1	0	2	0	—		7	0
Queens Park Rangers	Total		10	0	2	0	7	0	—		19	0
Northampton Town (loan)	2017–18	League One	20	0	0	0	—		0	0	20	0
Wycombe Wanderers (loan)	2018–19	League One	1	0	—		—		—		1	0
Hull City	2019–20	Championship	1	0	1	0	2	0	—		4	0
Hull City	2020–21	League One	38	0	0	0	2	0	3	0	43	0
Hull City	2021–22	Championship	29	0	0	0	0	0	—		29	0
Hull City	2022–23	Championship	22	0	1	0	0	0	—		23	0
Hull City	2023–24	Championship	10	0	1	0	1	0	—		12	0
Hull City	Total		100	0	3	0	5	0	3	0	111	0
Luton Town (loan)	2021–22	Championship	2	0	—		—		2 (Note: Appearances in Championship play-offs)	0	4	0
Oxford United	2024–25	Championship	1	0	1	0	2	0	0	0	4	0
Oxford United	2025–26	Championship	0	0	2	0	1	0	0	0	3	0
Oxford United	Total		1	0	3	0	3	0	0	0	7	0
West Bromwich Albion	2026–27	Championship	0	0	0	0	1	0	0	0	1	0
Career total			279	0	16	0	19	0	13	0	327	0

== Honours ==
Hull City

- EFL League One: 2020–21
