= Stuart Lewis =

English footballer & coach (born 1987)

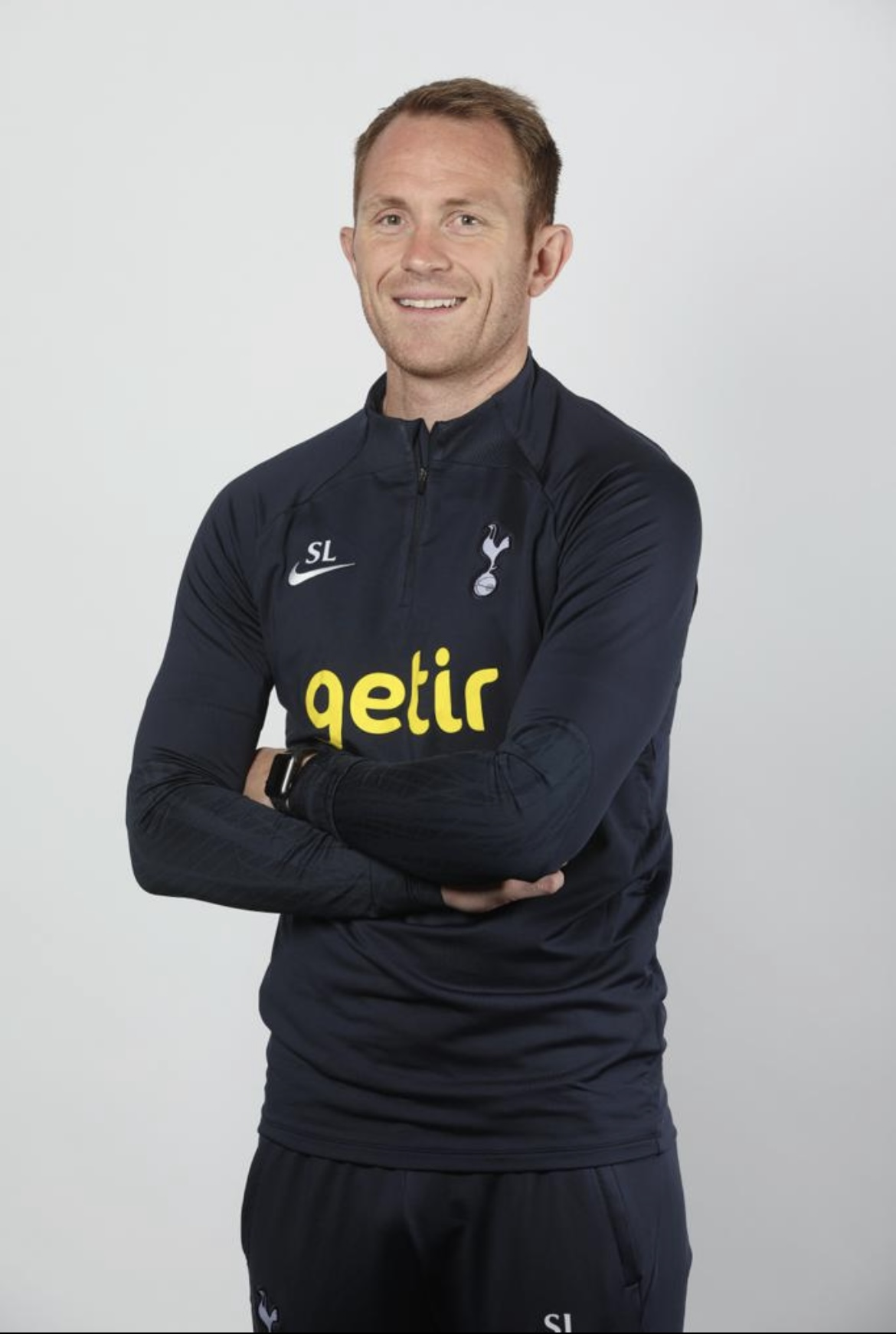
- Stuart Lewis at Tottenham Hotspur

Personal information
- Full name: Stuart Allan Lewis
- Date of birth: 15 October 1987 (age 39)
- Place of birth: Welwyn Garden City, England
- Height: 5 ft 10 in (1.78 m)
- Position: Midfielder

Youth career
- 1997–1998: Norwich City
- 1998–2004: Arsenal
- 2004–2005: Tottenham Hotspur

Senior career*
Years	Team	Apps	(Gls)
2005–2007	Tottenham Hotspur	0	(0)
2007	Barnet	4	(0)
2007–2008	Stevenage Borough	30	(3)
2008–2010	Gillingham	51	(1)
2010–2011	Dagenham & Redbridge	10	(0)
2010–2011	→ Wycombe Wanderers (loan)	25	(2)
2011–2015	Wycombe Wanderers	127	(6)
2015–2017	Ebbsfleet United	67	(4)
2017	→ Maidstone United (loan)	15	(1)
2017–2018	Maidstone United	54	(4)
2018–2019	Dover Athletic	31	(2)
Total		414	(23)

International career
2002–2003	England U16	5	(0)
2003	England U17	2	(0)
2007	England C	1	(0)

Managerial career
- 2019–2025: Tottenham Hotspur (youth)
- 2026-: Ipswich Town (first team coach)
- * Club domestic league appearances and goals

Stuart Allan Lewis (born 15 October 1987) is a retired English footballer who works for Ipswich Town as a first team coach, and is a UEFA Pro licence holder.

== Early life ==
Born in Welwyn Garden City, Lewis has lived in Turnford, Hertfordshire since birth. He played youth football for Wormley youth U8-U10s. While playing U10s he captained the league representative team, winning the interleague cup.

== Career ==
=== Youth career ===
Lewis joined for Norwich City Academy in 1995, and moved to the Arsenal Academy in 1998. During his time at Arsenal he captained the U10s to U16s also representing the England Youth team. He played six games for the U16s squad, winning the Victory Shield in 2002 and captaining the team in 2003 on tour to Northern Ireland. Furthermore, he played twice for the England U17s. He joined the Tottenham Hotspur youth system in 2004 on a scholarship contract.

In 2005, he signed a two-year professional contract. After signing his contract Lewis went on to regularly captain the Tottenham U18s youth team. Notably playing in the FA Youth Cup semi-final team, whilst playing alongside players who were a year older.

He progressed to the Tottenham reserve team, where he played regularly. In 2006, won the Premier Reserve League South.

=== Move to Barnet ===
Lewis wanted to play first team football. In 2007, he left Tottenham to join Barnet on 31 January 2007, where he made his Bees debut against Torquay United on 3 February. On 22 March, he was released by Barnet and he subsequently signed for Stevenage Borough.

=== Stevenage ===
In the same year (2007) he signed for Stevenage Borough. Whilst playing here, he starred in the England C team against Finland U'21s, winning 2–0 in Helsinki.

=== Gillingham ===
Lewis signed for Gillingham on 28 January 2008, alongside Barry Fuller, both men linking up again with former Stevenage manager Mark Stimson. He made his debut for Gillingham in the 2–0 away defeat to Tranmere Rovers on 29 January 2008. Lewis played for Gillingham in the 2009 Football League Two play-off final at the new Wembley Stadium, gaining promotion to League One after beating Shrewsbury Town 1–0.

=== Dagenham & Redbridge ===
He joined newly promoted League One side Dagenham & Redbridge on a three-year contract in June 2010.

=== Wycombe Wanderers ===
After making 10 appearances for the "Daggers", on 22 November, he was sent on a one-month loan to Wycombe Wanderers. The deal was extended by a further month on 21 December, and the following month Lewis' contract with Dagenham was cancelled by mutual consent and he joined Wycombe on an 18-month contract. After signing a permanent deal for Wycombe in January 2011 Lewis went on to be an integral part of the team which gained automatic promotion to league one in 2011.

Wycombe were relegated to League Two in 2012. Lewis remained at the club, making over 150 first-team appearances and being named Players' Player of the Season and Wycombe Wanderers supporters association Player of the Year in 2012–13. Wanderers manager Gareth Ainsworth appointed Lewis as club captain in 2013.

=== Ebbsfleet United ===
In January 2015 Lewis dropped into Non-League football when he joined Conference South club Ebbsfleet United. Manager Jamie Day made Lewis club captain in 2015. Lewis was voted Ebbsfleet player of the year for 2015–16.

=== Maidstone United ===
On 19 January 2017 Lewis joined National League club Maidstone United on loan until the end of the season. He made his debut against Torquay United on 21 January, with his performance in the 2–1 victory winning him the man-of-the-match award. On 29 April it was announced that Lewis had made his move permanent. Lewis was named Maidstone United's Supporters Player of the Year 2016–17, he was also named in the Kent Online Team of the Season 2016–17. In January 2018 manager Jay Saunders named Lewis as captain.

=== Dover Athletic ===
On 11 October 2018, following a transfer request, Lewis left Maidstone to join fellow league rivals, Dover Athletic on a two-year deal. He made 31 league appearances in the 2018–19 season, scoring two goals.

== Coaching career ==
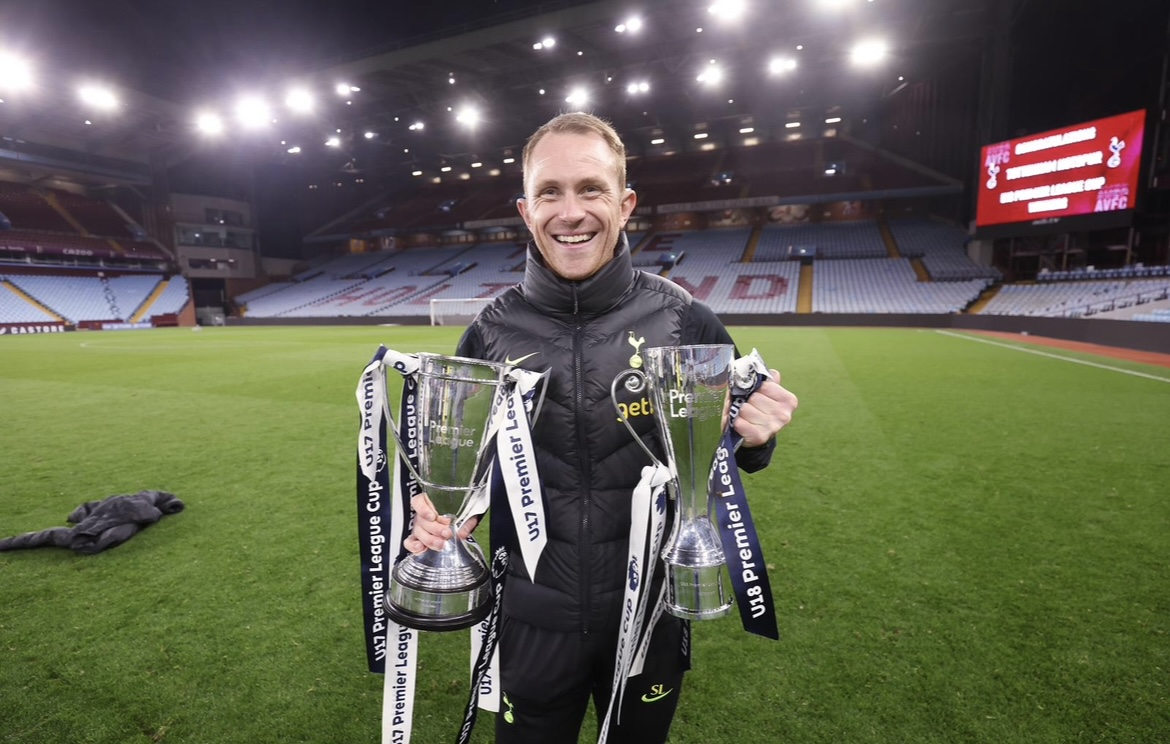
Lewis winning trophies for Tottenham Hotspur U17 and U18 in 2023

Having had a part-time role there for four years, Lewis took up a full-time coaching role at the Tottenham Hotspur academy in 2019, and thereupon retired from playing football. In July 2021, Lewis was appointed coach of Tottenham Under-18s. In 2022 the team reachedthe final of the under 18s Premier League Cup. In 2023 Lewis went on to win the double with the Tottenham Hotspur U17s and U18s both winning the Premier League Cup. Lewis later went on to win the Premier League Cup again with the U17s in the 2024–25 season. Whilst coaching at Tottenham Hotspur Lewis went on to complete a bachelor of science degree in exercise and sports science In 2022. In July 2025, Lewis was promoted to first team academy transition coach.

On 20 July 2026, he was announced as a new first team coach for Ipswich Town.

== Career statistics ==
Appearances and goals by club, season and competition
Club	Season	League			FA Cup		League Cup		Other		Total	
Club	Season	Division	Apps	Goals	Apps	Goals	Apps	Goals	Apps	Goals	Apps	Goals
Barnet	2006–07	League Two	4	0	0	0	0	0	0	0	4	0
Stevenage Borough	2006–07	Conference National	8	0	0	0	—		0	0	8	0
Stevenage Borough	2007–08	Conference National	22	3	1	0	—		0	0	23	3
Stevenage Borough	Total		30	3	1	0	0	0	0	0	31	3
Gillingham	2007–08	League One	10	0	—		0	0	0	0	10	0
Gillingham	2008–09	League Two	21	0	2	0	0	0	3 (Note: Appearances in League Two play-offs)	0	26	0
Gillingham	2009–10	League One	20	1	3	0	0	0	1 (Note: Appearances in Football League Trophy)	0	24	1
Gillingham	Total		51	1	5	0	0	0	4	0	60	1
Dagenham & Redbridge	2010–11	League One	10	0	0	0	1	0	0	0	11	0
Wycombe Wanderers (loan)	2010–11	League Two	25	2	2	0	—		0	0	27	2
Wycombe Wanderers	2011–12	League One	41	1	1	0	1	0	2	0	45	1
Wycombe Wanderers	2012–13	League Two	44	2	0	0	1	0	0	0	45	2
Wycombe Wanderers	2013–14	League Two	36	3	3	0	1	0	3	0	43	3
Wycombe Wanderers	2014–15	League Two	6	0	1	0	0	0	1	0	8	0
Wycombe Wanderers	Total		127	6	5	0	3	0	6	0	141	6
Ebbsfleet United	2014–15	Conference South	16	2	—		—		4 (Note: Appearances in FA Trophy)	0	20	2
Ebbsfleet United	2015–16	National League South	39	1	1	0	—		5 (Note: Two appearances in FA Trophy, three appearances and a goal in National League South play-offs)	1	45	2
Ebbsfleet United	2016–17	National League South	12	1	3	2	—		3	0	18	3
Ebbsfleet United	Total		67	4	4	2	0	0	12	1	83	7
Maidstone United (loan)	2016–17	National League	15	1	—		—		0	0	15	1
Maidstone United	2017–18	National League	41	4	4	0	—		4	0	49	4
Maidstone United	2018–19	National League	13	0	0	0	—		0	0	13	0
Maidstone United	Total		54	4	4	0	0	0	4	0	62	4
Dover Athletic	2018–19	National League	31	2	2	0	—		2	0	35	2
Career total			414	23	23	2	4	0	28	1	469	26

== Honours ==
Gillingham

- Football League Two play-offs: 2009
