= Marvin McCoy =

Footballer (born 1988)

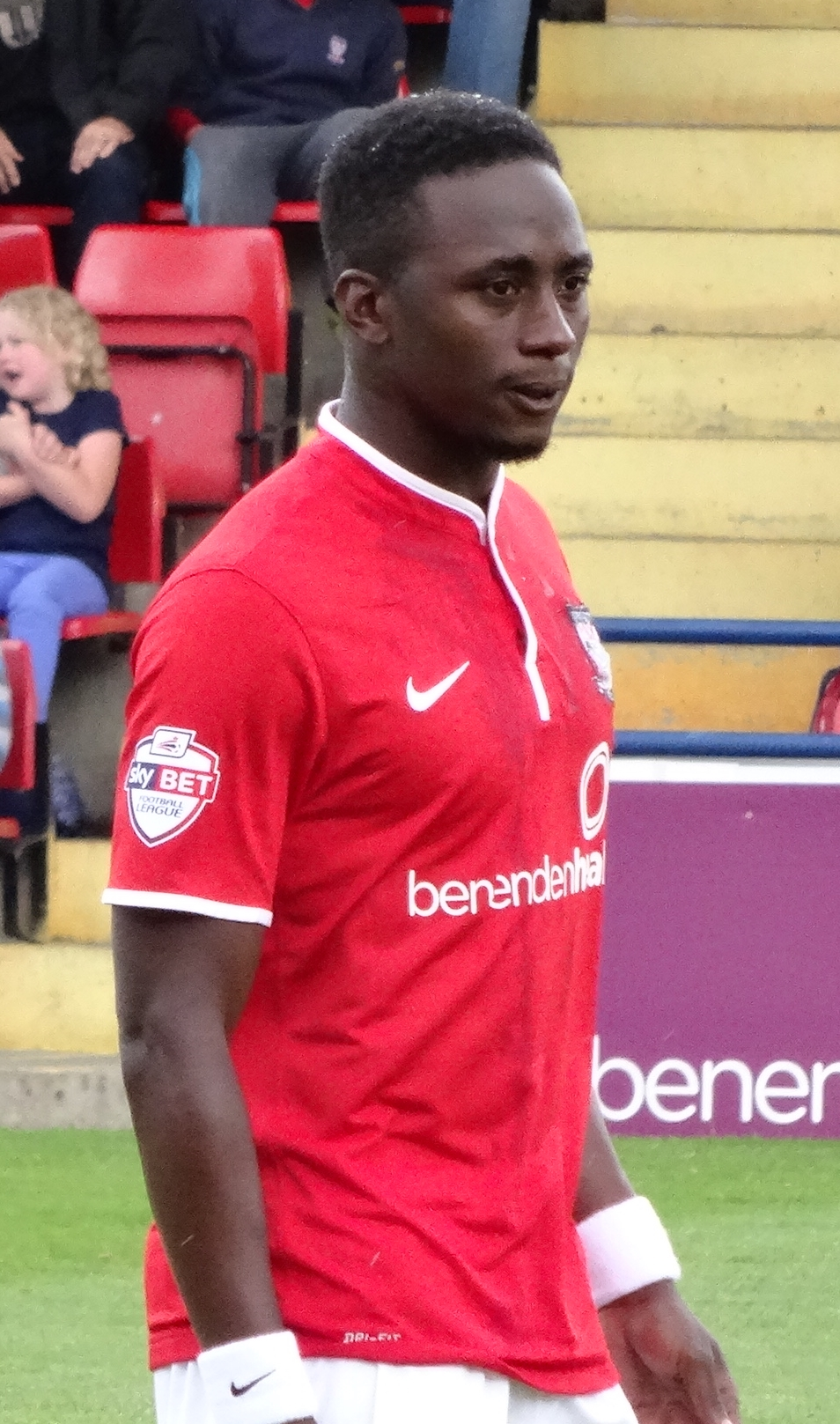
- McCoy playing for York City in 2014

Personal information
- Full name: Marvin Anthony Michael McCoy
- Date of birth: 2 October 1988 (age 38)
- Place of birth: Walthamstow, England
- Height: 5 ft 11 in (1.81 m)
- Position: Defender

Team information
- Current team: Cray Wanderers

Youth career
- Leyton
- Arsenal
- –2007: Watford

Senior career*
Years	Team	Apps	(Gls)
2007	Hereford United	0	(0)
2007–2008	Harrow Borough	0	(0)
2008	Leyton		
2008–2010	Wealdstone	65	(1)
2010–2014	Wycombe Wanderers	91	(0)
2014–2016	York City	45	(0)
2016–2018	Ebbsfleet United	53	(0)
2018–2019	Aldershot Town	16	(0)
2019–2020	Dulwich Hamlet	15	(0)
2020	Romford	4	(0)
2021–	Cray Wanderers	1	(1)

International career^{‡}
2010–	Antigua and Barbuda	8	(0)
- * Club domestic league appearances and goals as of 16:51, 2 October 2021 (UTC) ‡ National team caps and goals as of 02:10, 15 December 2018 (UTC)

Marvin Anthony Michael McCoy (born 2 October 1988) is a semi-professional footballer who plays as a defender for Cray Wanderers. Born in England, he has represented Antigua and Barbuda internationally.

== Club career ==
=== Early career ===
Born in Walthamstow, London, McCoy was part of the youth teams of Leyton, Arsenal and Watford before becoming a trainee with the latter. He was released by Watford in the summer of 2007 having not been given a professional contract, and joined League Two club Hereford United on 31 August on a one-month contract. In December 2007, he made his debut for Isthmian League Premier Division club Harrow Borough in a 1–0 defeat to Staines Town in the Middlesex Senior Cup, which proved to be his only appearance for the club. He returned to Isthmian League Premier Division Leyton in January 2008, before signing for Wealdstone, of the same division, on 6 August 2008.

=== Wealdstone ===
McCoy played impressively for Wealdstone in the 2008–09 season, in which he made 34 appearances, and was rewarded with a new contract in June 2009. He was named the club's Player of the Year, being awarded the Jock Law trophy, after being chosen by the club's supporters for his performances in 2009–10. He was also named the Players' Player of the Year, for a season in which he made 50 appearances and scored one goal. During this time he also worked in CCTV management in the Kings Cross area of London.

=== Wycombe Wanderers ===
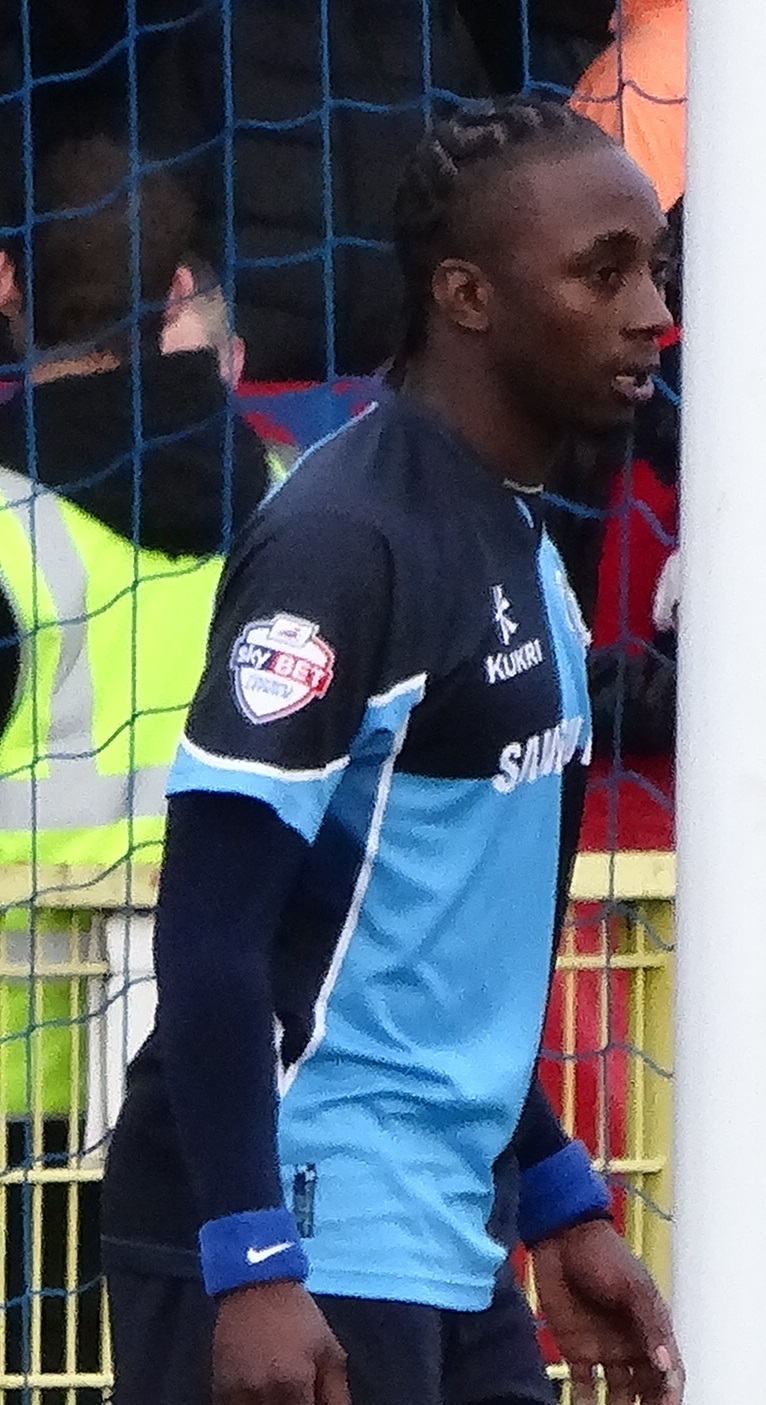
McCoy playing for Wycombe Wanderers in 2014

McCoy entered the professional game after signing for Wycombe Wanderers of League Two on 27 July 2010 on a one-year contract for an undisclosed fee, after impressing on trial. He made his debut for Wycombe on 10 August 2010 in their League Cup first round 2–1 defeat to Millwall at Adams Park. He did not make his Football League debut until 3 January 2011 in a 1–0 home win over Gillingham, before making the right back position his own ahead of Danny Foster. McCoy signed a new contract with Wycombe in March 2011, tying him to the club until the summer of 2013. He helped Wycombe earn promotion to League One after finishing third in League Two in 2010–11, appearing 25 times.

McCoy made 32 appearances for Wycombe in 2011–12, which culminated in the club being relegated after one year in League One. He sustained ankle ligament damage during Wycombe's 1–0 away defeat to Watford in the League Cup on 11 August 2012, and only returned to the team four months later in a 2–0 loss away to Yeovil Town in the Football League Trophy on 4 December. He signed a new one-year contract in July 2013, after making 11 appearances in 2012–13.

McCoy was a key figure for Wycombe in 2013–14, in which they fought against relegation from League Two, and he finished the campaign with 40 appearances. However, he was released by Wycombe on 15 May 2014, after four years at the club.

=== York City ===
He signed for League Two club York City on 9 June 2014 on a two-year contract. He made his debut in York's 1–1 away draw with Tranmere Rovers in the opening match of 2014–15 on 9 August 2014. On 22 January 2016, McCoy left York by mutual consent.

=== Ebbsfleet United ===
McCoy signed for National League South club Ebbsfleet United on 12 August 2016. He started in Ebbsfleet's 2–1 win over Chelmsford City in the 2017 National League South play-off final, which saw the club promoted to the National League. He was released by Ebbsfleet at the end of 2017–18.

=== Aldershot Town ===
McCoy signed for National League club Aldershot Town on 2 July 2018 on a contract of undisclosed length. In April 2019, he was released by the club.

=== Dulwich Hamlet ===
He signed for Dulwich Hamlet on 7 September 2019.

=== Romford ===
McCoy joined Romford for the 2020–21 season.

== International career ==
McCoy was called up to make his debut for the Antigua and Barbuda national team in late 2010.

== Career statistics ==
=== Club ===
As of match played 7 October 2020

Appearances and goals by club, season and competition
Club	Season	League			FA Cup		League Cup		Other		Total	
Club	Season	Division	Apps	Goals	Apps	Goals	Apps	Goals	Apps	Goals	Apps	Goals
Harrow Borough	2007–08	Isthmian League Premier Division	0	0	—		—		1 (Note: Appearance in Middlesex Senior Cup)	0	1	0
Wealdstone	2008–09	Isthmian League Premier Division	28	0	2	0	—		4 (Note: One appearance in FA Trophy, one in Isthmian League Cup, two in Middlesex Senior Cup)	0	34	0
Wealdstone	2009–10	Isthmian League Premier Division	37	1	5	0	—		8 (Note: Three appearances in FA Trophy, five in Isthmian League Cup)	0	50	1
Wealdstone	Total		65	1	7	0	—		12	0	84	1
Wycombe Wanderers	2010–11	League Two	21	0	1	0	1	0	2 (Note: Appearance(s) in Football League Trophy)	0	25	0
Wycombe Wanderers	2011–12	League One	28	0	0	0	2	0	2	0	32	0
Wycombe Wanderers	2012–13	League Two	9	0	0	0	1	0	1	0	11	0
Wycombe Wanderers	2013–14	League Two	33	0	3	0	1	0	3	0	40	0
Wycombe Wanderers	Total		91	0	4	0	5	0	8	0	108	0
York City	2014–15	League Two	31	0	2	0	1	0	1	0	35	0
York City	2015–16	League Two	14	0	1	0	2	0	2	0	19	0
York City	Total		45	0	3	0	3	0	3	0	54	0
Ebbsfleet United	2016–17	National League South	34	0	3	0	—		7 (Note: Four appearances in FA Trophy, three in National League South play-offs)	0	44	0
Ebbsfleet United	2017–18	National League	19	0	1	0	—		2 (Note: Appearances in National League play-offs)	0	22	0
Ebbsfleet United	Total		53	0	4	0	—		9	0	66	0
Aldershot Town	2018–19	National League	16	0	3	0	—		0	0	19	0
Dulwich Hamley	2019–20	National League South	15	0	2	0	—		1	0	18	0
Romford	2020–21	Isthmian League North Division	4	0	0	0	—		0	0	4	0
Career total			289	1	23	0	8	0	34	0	354	1

=== International ===
As of match played 10 June 2015

Appearances and goals by national team and year
National team	Year	Apps	Goals
Antigua and Barbuda	2010	3	0
Antigua and Barbuda	2011	1	0
Antigua and Barbuda	2012	3	0
Antigua and Barbuda	2015	1	0
Total		8	0

== Honours ==
Wycombe Wanderers

- Football League Two third-place promotion: 2010–11

Ebbsfleet United

- National League South play-offs: 2017

Individual

- Wealdstone Player of the Year: 2009–10
