= Jon-Paul Pittman =

English footballer (born 1986)

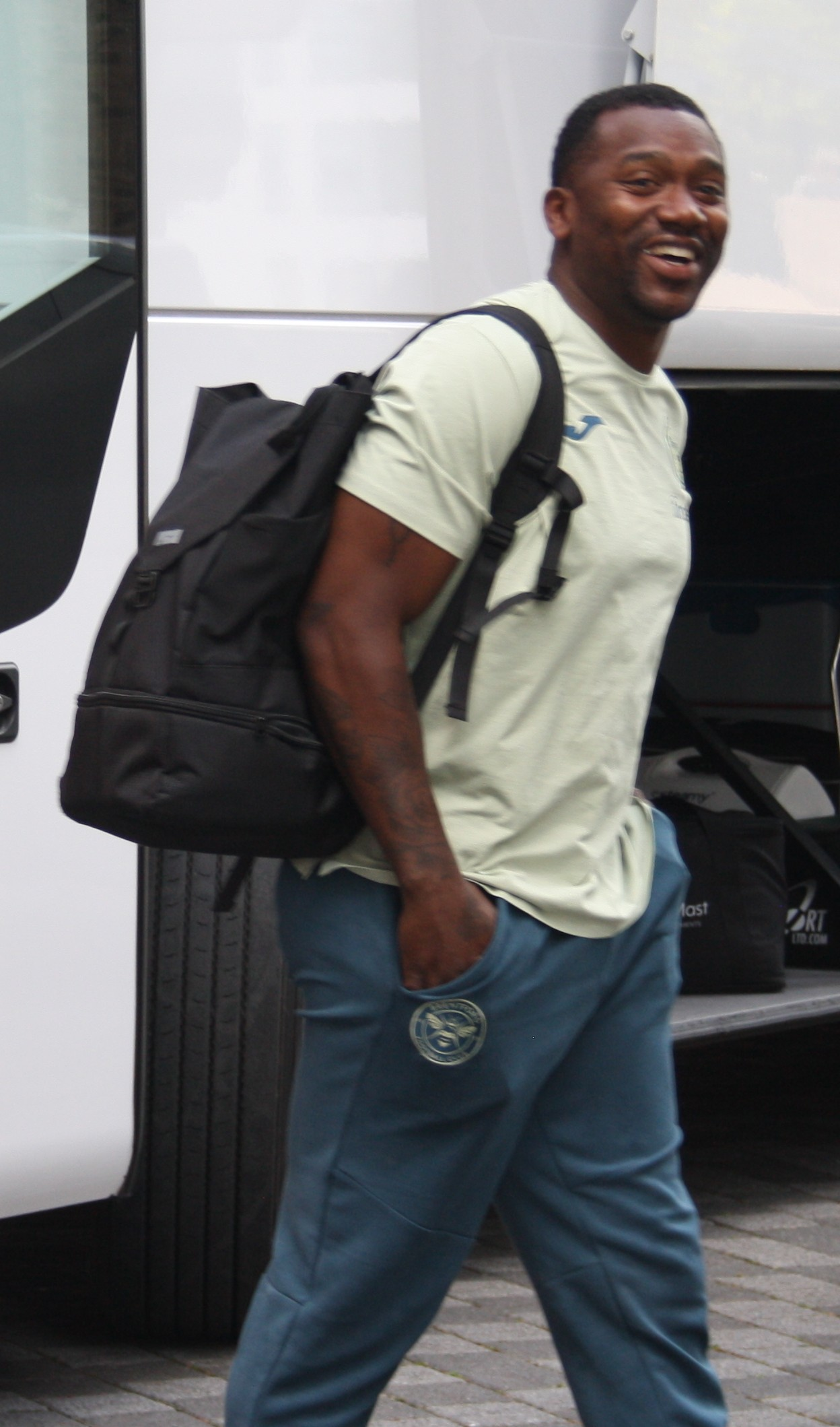
- Pittman in 2026

Personal information
- Full name: Jon-Paul Pittman
- Date of birth: 24 October 1986 (age 40)
- Place of birth: Oklahoma City, Oklahoma, U.S.
- Height: 5 ft 10 in (1.78 m)
- Positions: Forward; winger

Team information
- Current team: Brentford U18 (individual development coach)

Youth career
- 1995–1998: Aston Villa
- 1998–2005: Nottingham Forest

Senior career*
Years	Team	Apps	(Gls)
2005–2006	Nottingham Forest	0	(0)
2006	→ Hartlepool United (loan)	3	(0)
2006	→ Bury (loan)	9	(1)
2007	Doncaster Rovers	0	(0)
2007–2009	Crawley Town	61	(22)
2009–2011	Wycombe Wanderers	77	(14)
2011–2013	Oxford United	30	(5)
2011	→ Crawley Town (loan)	4	(1)
2013–2014	Wycombe Wanderers	10	(0)
2014–2016	Grimsby Town	59	(15)
2016–2017	Harrogate Town	28	(11)
2017–2019	Torquay United	19	(3)
2018–2019	→ Truro City (loan)	17	(3)
Total		317	(75)

International career
2008	England C	1	(0)

Managerial career
- 2025: Brentford U18 (interim)
- 2026–: England U16 (assistant coach)
- * Club domestic league appearances and goals

Jon-Paul Pittman (born 24 October 1986) is an English football coach and former professional player who works as Individual Development Coach at Brentford.

== Club career ==
=== Early career ===
Pittman was born in Oklahoma City, Oklahoma, and raised in England. He began his footballing journey in the Aston Villa academy at the age of eight before moving to Nottingham Forest, where he spent eight years and completed his scholarship. Under manager Gary Megson, he appeared in FA Cup and Football League Trophy fixtures and gained first-team experience through loan spells with Hartlepool United and Bury. He scored his first Football League goal for Bury in August 2006 before leaving Forest later that year. A short-term deal with Doncaster Rovers followed in January 2007.

=== Crawley Town ===
Released in the summer of 2007, Pittman joined Crawley Town in the Conference Premier. Over two seasons he became one of the division’s most consistent forwards, scoring 31 goals in 74 appearances across all competitions.

=== Wycombe Wanderers (first spell) ===
In February 2009, Wycombe Wanderers signed Pittman for a five-figure fee. He scored the winning goal on his debut at Dagenham & Redbridge and helped Wycombe secure promotion to League One. A hamstring tendon injury required surgery in 2010 but he returned to help the club achieve a second promotion in three seasons, finishing with 17 goals from 82 appearances in all competitions.

=== Oxford United and Crawley Town (loan) ===
In May 2011, Pittman signed a two-year contract after meeting with Chris Wilder and Oxford United. He later rejoined Crawley Town on loan during their 2011–12 League Two title-winning campaign, scoring once in four matches. Returning to Oxford, he netted against his former side in a 1–1 draw in January 2012.

=== Return to Wycombe Wanderers ===
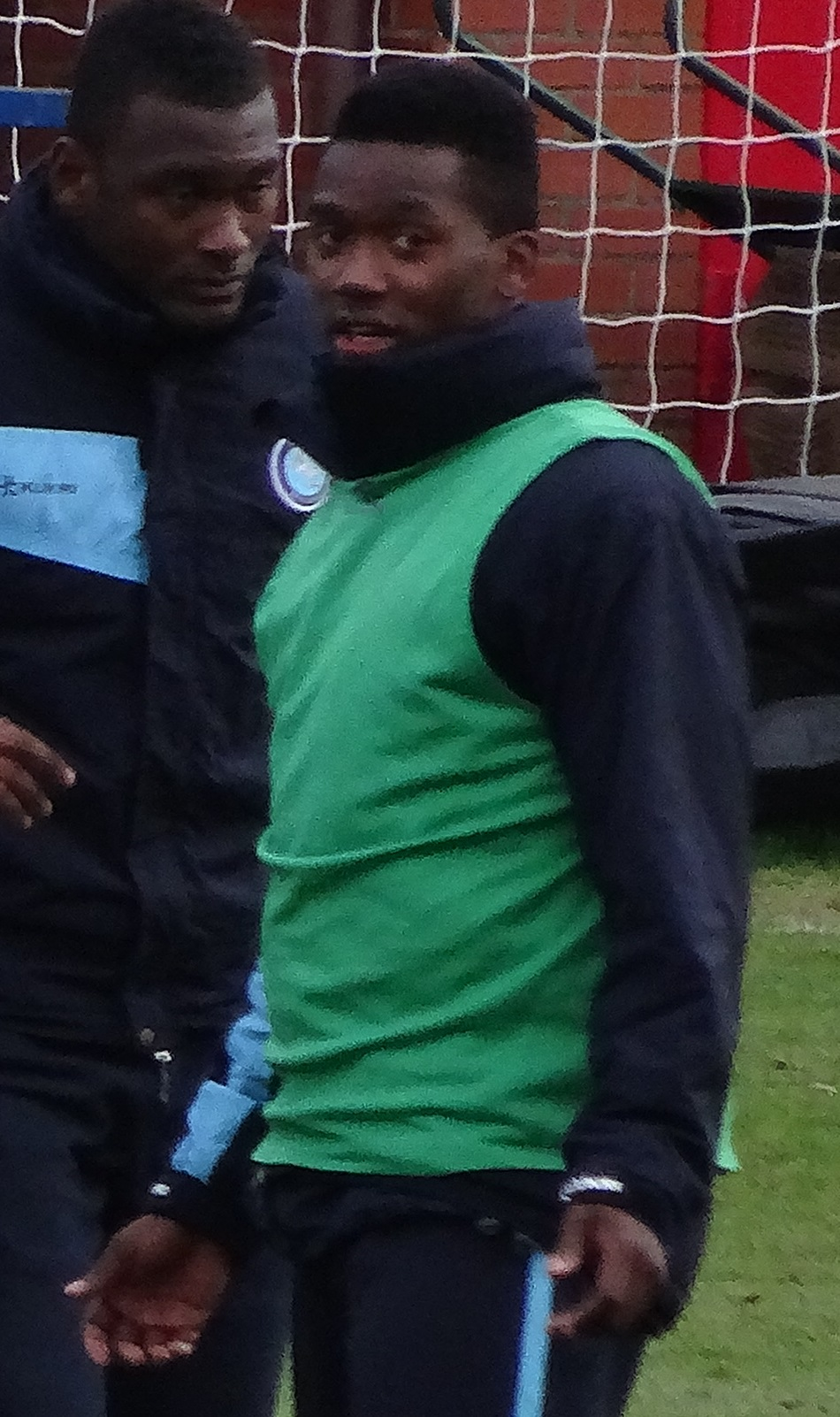
Pittman warming up with Wycombe Wanderers in 2014.

Pittman left Oxford in 2012 and re-signed for Wycombe Wanderers under manager Gareth Ainsworth. He made 11 appearances during his second spell before moving on at the end of the season.

=== Grimsby Town ===
After a successful trial period, Pittman signed for Grimsby Town in July 2014, joining the club in the National League. He appeared in consecutive finals at Wembley Stadium within twelve months. Pittman featured in the 2015 Conference Premier play-off final, entering as a substitute and missing a penalty in the shoot-out defeat to Bristol Rovers before returning the following season for the 2016 National League play-off final, helping Grimsby defeat Forest Green Rovers 3–1 to secure promotion back to the Football League. He also played in the FA Trophy final later that season, meaning he made three appearances at Wembley within a twelve-month period — a notable milestone in the club’s modern history.

=== Harrogate Town ===
Following his departure from Grimsby, Pittman joined Harrogate Town in May 2016. He scored on his debut and finished the season with 11 league goals from 28 appearances in the National League North.

=== Torquay United and Truro City ===
In June 2017, Pittman signed a two-year contract with Torquay United. The following season he joined Truro City on loan for 2018–19. A serious patellar tendon avulsion injury suffered against Welling United in January 2019 required surgery and effectively ended his playing career.

== International career ==
England C manager Paul Fairclough called up Pittman, for whom he gained a cap against Italy in the 2007–09 International Challenge Trophy.

== Coaching career ==
A graduate of the Premier League’s Professional Player to Coach Scheme, he has worked in academy and professional development roles at Exeter City, Forest Green Rovers and Brentford. Pittman’s position at Brentford centres on player-specific performance and progression within the Professional Development Phase, extending a club philosophy of individualised learning first established at senior level under Steven Pressley and, earlier, through Thomas Frank’s integration of the B Team and first team structures.

After retiring through injury in 2019, Pittman gained his UEFA A Licence and the FA Advanced Youth Award before joining Exeter City’s academy staff in 2020. His involvement in the Professional Player to Coach Scheme—a joint initiative by the PFA, Premier League and EFL—was profiled by both the league and the club.

He later joined Forest Green Rovers as Professional Development Phase Coach in 2022, and moved to Brentford in 2023 as Assistant Head Coach of the under-18s, working alongside Lydia Bedford.

Following Bedford’s departure in January 2025, he took interim charge of the team before assuming his current Individual Development Coach role for the 2025–26 season.

In September 2026, Pittman was named assistant coach of the England men's under-16s for the 2026–27 season, working under head coach Neil Ryan alongside fellow assistant Sam Meek.

== Personal life ==
Pittman attended Leeds Beckett University and graduated with a master's degree in sports coaching.

== Career statistics ==
As of matches played 5 January 2019

Appearances and goals by club, season and competition
Club	Season	League			FA Cup		League Cup		Other		Total	
Club	Season	Division	Apps	Goals	Apps	Goals	Apps	Goals	Apps	Goals	Apps	Goals
Nottingham Forest	2005–06	League One	0	0	1	0	0	0	1 (Note: Appearance in Football League Trophy)	0	2	0
Hartlepool United (loan)	2005–06	League One	3	0	—		—		—		3	0
Bury (loan)	2006–07	League Two	9	1	—		1	0	—		10	1
Doncaster Rovers	2006–07	League One	0	0	—		—		1	0	1	0
Crawley Town	2007–08	Conference Premier	36	12	2	0	—		6 (Note: Four appearances and two goals in FA Trophy, two appearances and two goals in Conference League Cup)	4	44	16
Crawley Town	2008–09	Conference Premier	25	10	1	0	—		4 (Note: Two appearances and one goal in Conference League Cup, two appearances and four goals in FA Trophy,)	5	30	15
Crawley Town	Total		61	22	3	0	—		10	9	74	31
Wycombe Wanderers	2008–09	League Two	17	3	—		—		—		17	3
Wycombe Wanderers	2009–10	League One	41	7	2	1	1	0	1	2	45	10
Wycombe Wanderers	2010–11	League Two	19	4	0	0	1	0	0	0	20	4
Wycombe Wanderers	Total		77	14	2	1	2	0	1	2	82	17
Oxford United	2011–12	League Two	15	3	—		1	0	—		16	3
Oxford United	2012–13	League Two	15	2	2	1	1	0	1	0	19	3
Oxford United	Total		30	5	2	1	2	0	1	0	35	6
Crawley Town (loan)	2011–12	League Two	4	1	0	0	—		—		4	1
Wycombe Wanderers	2013–14	League Two	10	0	0	0	1	0	0	0	11	0
Grimsby Town	2014–15	Conference Premier	31	10	2	0	—		6 (Note: Three appearances and one goal in FA Trophy, three appearances in Conference Premier play-offs)	1	39	11
Grimsby Town	2015–16	National League	28	5	4	1	—		6 (Note: Four appearances and two goals in the FA Trophy, two appearances in the National League play-offs)	2	38	8
Grimsby Town	Total		59	15	6	1	—		12	3	77	19
Harrogate Town	2016–17	National League North	28	11	1	0	—		2 (Note: Appearances in the FA Trophy)	2	31	13
Torquay United	2017–18	National League	17	3	0	0	—		1	0	18	3
Truro City	2018–19	National League South	17	3	0	0	0	0	2	2	19	5
Career total			315	75	15	3	6	0	31	18	367	96

== Honours ==
Wycombe Wanderers

- Football League Two promotion: 2008–09, 2010–11

Grimsby Town

- National League play-offs: 2016
- FA Trophy runner-up: 2015–16
