= Dave Winfield (footballer) =

English footballer (born 1988)

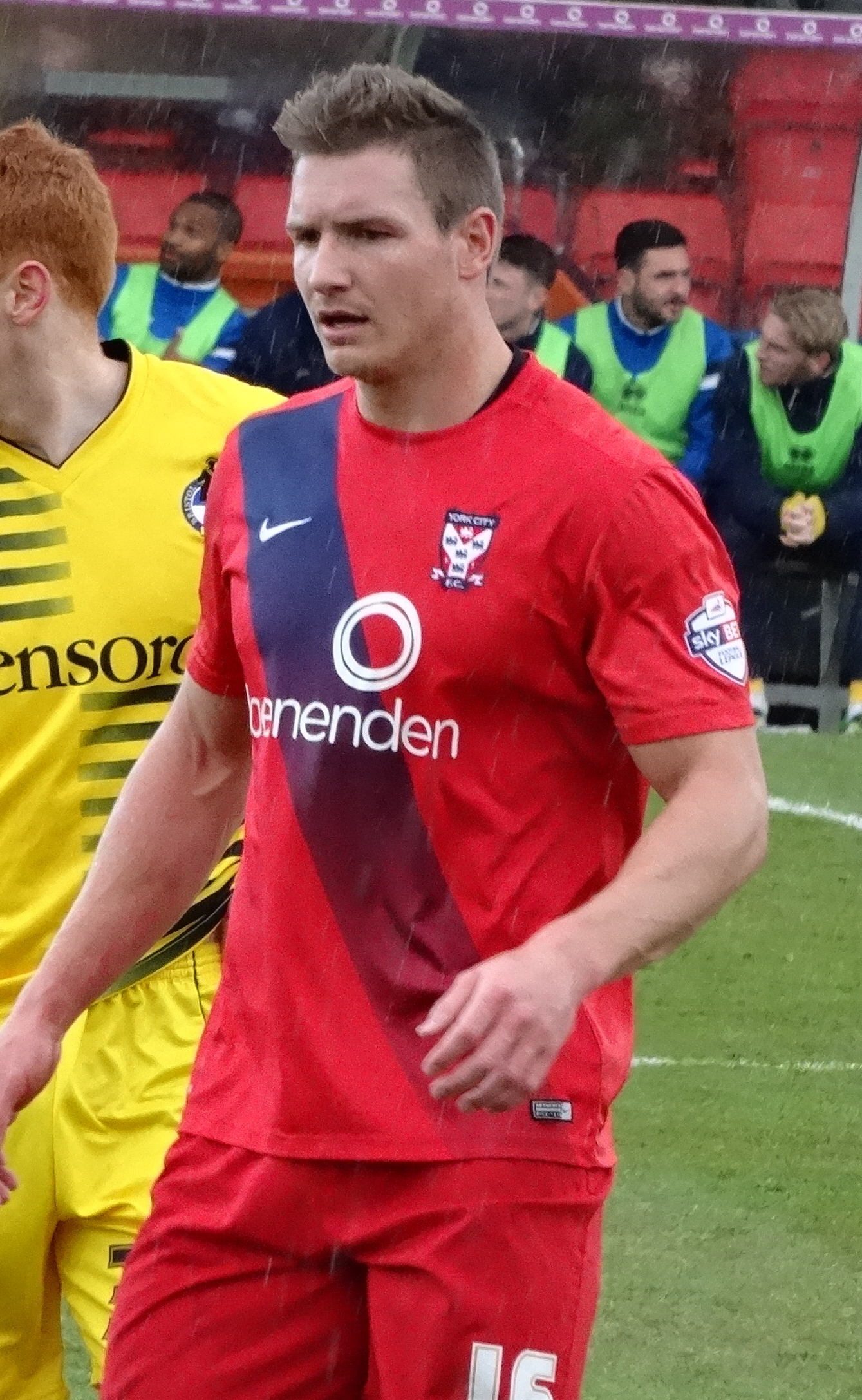
- Winfield playing for York City in 2016

Personal information
- Full name: David Thomas Winfield
- Date of birth: 24 March 1988 (age 38)
- Place of birth: Aldershot, England
- Height: 6 ft 3 in (1.91 m)
- Position: Defender

Team information
- Current team: Ramsgate

Youth career
- –2004: Aldershot Town

Senior career*
Years	Team	Apps	(Gls)
2004–2010	Aldershot Town	93	(5)
2004–2005	→ Chertsey Town (loan)		
2006	→ Staines Town (loan)	7	(0)
2009	→ Salisbury City (loan)	4	(0)
2010–2013	Wycombe Wanderers	91	(6)
2013–2014	Shrewsbury Town	17	(0)
2014–2016	York City	47	(4)
2015	→ AFC Wimbledon (loan)	7	(0)
2016–2019	Ebbsfleet United	80	(3)
2019	Chelmsford City	7	(1)
2019–2020	Bromley	13	(0)
2020	Romford	5	(0)
2021–2024	Chelmsford City	87	(2)
2024–2025	Welling United	38	(2)
2025–2026	Hornchurch	3	(0)
2026	→ Dartford (loan)	4	(0)
2026–	Ramsgate	0	(0)
- * Club domestic league appearances and goals as of 14:00, 17 May 2026 (UTC)

David Thomas Winfield (born 24 March 1988) is an English semi-professional footballer who plays as a defender for Isthmian League Premier Division club Ramsgate.

== Career ==
=== Aldershot Town ===
Born in Aldershot, Hampshire, Winfield came through the ranks of the Aldershot Town youth team and was loaned out to Isthmian League Division Two club Chertsey Town in the 2004–05 season. He signed a one-year professional contract with Aldershot on 16 July 2005 and joined Isthmian League Premier Division club Staines Town on loan in early 2006. Winfield made his debut in a 3–1 home defeat to Wealdstone on 2 February 2006 and had made seven appearances when returning to Aldershot in March.

He won two trophies with Aldershot Town, winning the Conference League Cup and Conference Premier in 2007–08. Unfortunately, a knee injury sustained in the Conference League Cup final against Rushden & Diamonds resulted in him missing pre-season training ahead of the Shots' first season in League Two.

Having begun training at the end of 2008, Winfield was loaned out to Salisbury City of the Conference Premier in January 2009 on a one-month deal that saw Andy Sandell move the other way on a permanent deal. Winfield made his Football League debut in Aldershot's 2–1 defeat to Exeter City in February 2009.

=== Wycombe Wanderers ===
Winfield signed a two-year deal for Wycombe Wanderers upon the expiry of his contract in June 2010, and a tribunal ruled that Wycombe pay a fee of £25,000 plus a 20% sell-on clause. He made 40 appearances for Wycombe in 2010–11 as they won promotion to League One after finishing in third place in League Two.

=== Shrewsbury Town ===
Winfield turned down a new contract at Wycombe at the end of 2012–13, to join League One club Shrewsbury Town on a free transfer on 12 June 2013. However, he picked up a hamstring injury late in pre-season that delayed his availability for selection until September 2013. Having played 30 minutes of a reserve match against Oldham Athletic, Winfield eventually made the substitutes' bench for an away match at Crawley Town on 14 September 2013, and made his first team debut away at Bradford City two weeks later, getting sent off for two bookable offences in a 2–1 defeat. Following Shrewsbury's relegation from to League Two, Winfield was released on 2 June 2014, having come to an agreement to end his contract early.

=== York City ===
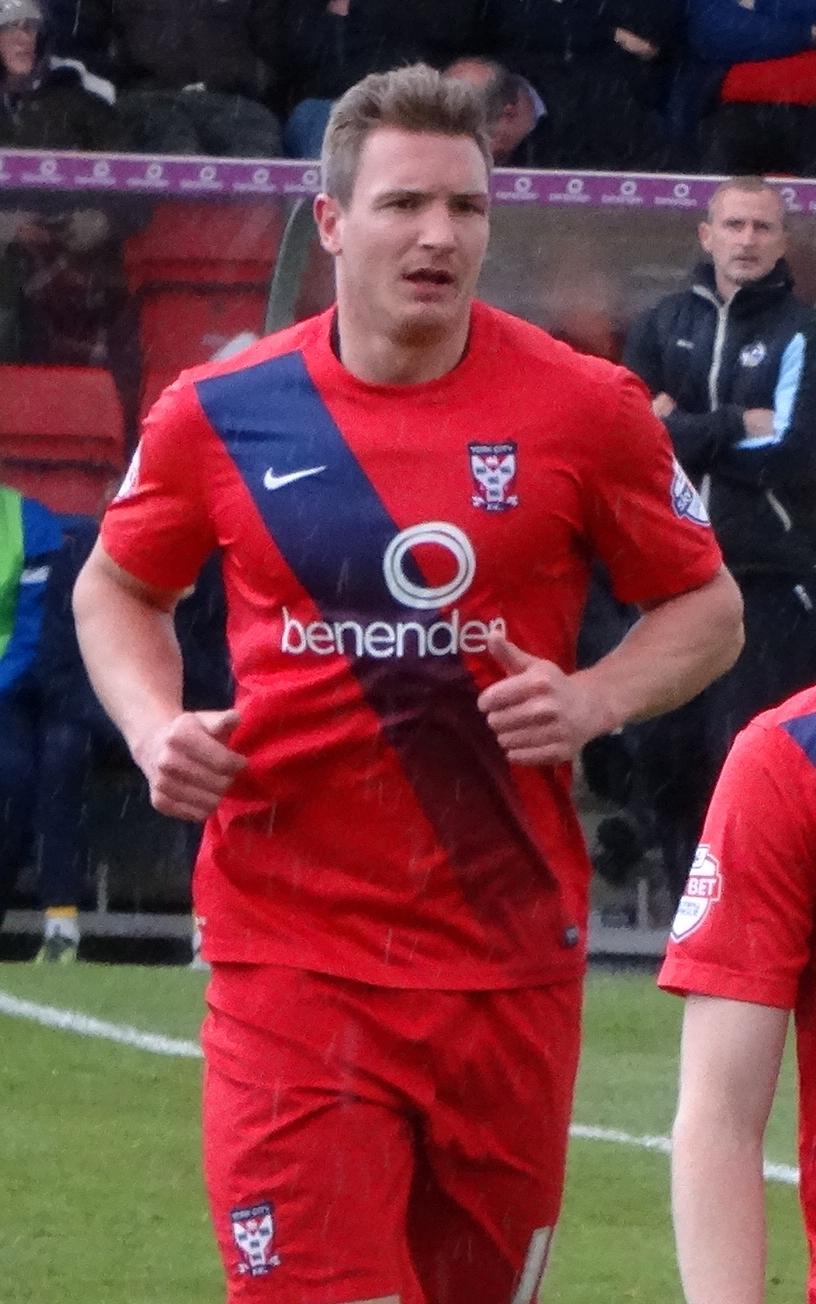
Winfield playing for York City in 2016

Following his release from Shrewsbury, Winfield joined League Two rivals York City on a two-year contract on 16 June 2014. He made his debut in a 1–0 home defeat to Doncaster Rovers in the League Cup first round on 12 August 2014. Winfield made only five appearances for York before joining their League Two rivals AFC Wimbledon on a one-month loan on 12 February 2015. He made his debut two days later in a 2–0 away defeat to Shrewsbury before the loan was extended in March 2015. He had made seven appearances for AFC Wimbledon when York recalled him on 19 March 2015 after an injury to Stéphane Zubar. Winfield left York after rejecting a new contract in June 2016.

=== Ebbsfleet United ===
Winfield joined National League South club Ebbsfleet United on 9 June 2016. He scored in the 76th minute of Ebbsfleet's 2–1 win over Chelmsford City in the 2017 National League South play-off final, which saw the club promoted to the National League.

=== Later career ===
On 2 October 2019, Winfield signed for Chelmsford City.

On 6 December 2019, after two goals in ten appearances in all competitions, Winfield moved up a division to sign for National League club Bromley.

Winfield signed for Romford prior to the 2020–21 season, making six appearances for the club in all competitions, before the season was curtailed due to the COVID-19 pandemic.

On 10 July 2021, Winfield returned to Chelmsford City. On 5 June 2024, after seven goals in 117 appearances in all competitions across two spells, Chelmsford City announced Winfield would be leaving the club.

On 6 June 2024, Winfield joined National League South side Welling United.

On 8 July 2025, Winfield returned to the National League South following Welling United's relegation, joining Hornchurch.

On 13 February 2025, Winfield joined Dartford on loan for the rest of the season.

On 17 May 2026, Winfield signed for Isthmian League side Ramsgate, reuniting with Adrian Pennock, with whom he played under during his time at Dartford.

== Career statistics ==
As of end of 2018–19 season

Appearances and goals by club, season and competition
Club	Season	League			FA Cup		League Cup		Other		Total	
Club	Season	Division	Apps	Goals	Apps	Goals	Apps	Goals	Apps	Goals	Apps	Goals
Aldershot Town	2004–05	Conference National	0	0	0	0	—		1 (Note: Appearance in Conference League Cup)	0	1	0
Aldershot Town	2005–06	Conference National	12	0	0	0	—		0	0	12	0
Aldershot Town	2006–07	Conference National	22	1	1	0	—		0	0	23	1
Aldershot Town	2007–08	Conference Premier	24	1	0	0	—		7 (Note: Four appearances in Conference League Cup, three appearances and one goal in FA Trophy)	1	31	2
Aldershot Town	2008–09	League Two	10	1	0	0	0	0	0	0	10	1
Aldershot Town	2009–10	League Two	25	2	0	0	0	0	2 (Note: One appearance in Football League Trophy, one in League Two play-offs)	0	27	2
Aldershot Town	Total		93	5	1	0	0	0	10	1	104	6
Staines Town (loan)	2005–06	Isthmian League Premier Division	7	0	—		—		—		7	0
Salisbury City (loan)	2008–09	Conference Premier	4	0	—		—		1 (Note: Appearance in FA Trophy)	0	5	0
Wycombe Wanderers	2010–11	League Two	37	2	2	0	0	0	1 (Note: Appearance(s) in Football League Trophy)	0	40	2
Wycombe Wanderers	2011–12	League One	25	2	1	0	2	0	0	0	28	2
Wycombe Wanderers	2012–13	League Two	29	2	1	0	0	0	2	0	32	2
Wycombe Wanderers	Total		91	6	4	0	2	0	3	0	100	6
Shrewsbury Town	2013–14	League One	17	0	1	0	0	0	0	0	18	0
York City	2014–15	League Two	10	2	0	0	1	0	0	0	11	2
York City	2015–16	League Two	37	2	1	0	2	0	0	0	40	2
York City	Total		47	4	1	0	3	0	0	0	51	4
AFC Wimbledon (loan)	2014–15	League Two	7	0	—		—		—		7	0
Ebbsfleet United	2016–17	National League South	32	3	2	0	—		5 (Note: Two appearances and one goal in FA Trophy, three appearances and one goal in National League South play-offs)	2	39	5
Ebbsfleet United	2017–18	National League	26	0	0	0	—		5 (Note: Three appearances in FA Trophy, two appearances and one goal in National League play-offs)	1	31	1
Ebbsfleet United	2018–19	National League	22	0	3	1	—		0	0	25	1
Ebbsfleet United	Total		80	3	5	1	—		10	3	95	7
Career total			346	18	12	1	5	0	24	4	387	23

== Honours ==
Aldershot Town

- Conference League Cup: 2007–08
- Conference Premier: 2007–08

Wycombe Wanderers

- Football League Two third-place promotion: 2010–11

Ebbsfleet United

- National League South play-offs: 2017

Individual

- York City Clubman of the Year: 2015–16
