= Matthew Parsons =

English footballer

Personal information
- Full name: Matthew John Parsons
- Date of birth: 25 December 1991 (age 34)
- Place of birth: Catford, England
- Height: 5 ft 10 in (1.78 m)
- Position: Left-back

Team information
- Current team: Faversham Town

Youth career
- Crystal Palace

Senior career*
Years	Team	Apps	(Gls)
2010–2014	Crystal Palace	6	(0)
2011	→ Barnet (loan)	8	(0)
2012	→ Wycombe Wanderers (loan)	4	(0)
2014	Plymouth Argyle	10	(0)
2014	Boreham Wood	1	(0)
2014–2015	Eastbourne Borough	6	(0)
2015	Maidenhead United	1	(0)
2015	Leatherhead	1	(0)
2015	Chatham Town	1	(0)
2016	Greenwich Borough	1	(0)
2017	Erith & Belvedere	18	(4)
2017–2018	Cray Valley Paper Mills	33	(2)
2018	Cray Wanderers	2	(0)
2018–2019	Chatham Town	32	(0)
2019–2020	Glebe	32	(2)
2020	Faversham Town	3	(0)
2020	Corinthian-Casuals	4	(0)
2020–2021	Romford	1	(0)
2021–2022	Glebe	0	(0)
2022	Sheppey United	10	(0)
2022–	Faversham Town	13	(0)
- * Club domestic league appearances and goals as of 23:09, 1 February 2023 (UTC)

Matthew John Parsons (born 25 December 1991) is an English footballer who plays as a left back for Faversham Town.

== Early life ==
Parsons attended Sedgehill School, Lewisham.

== Playing career ==
Parsons graduated from the Crystal Palace Academy to sign his first professional contract with Crystal Palace in April 2010. He made his first team debut in the League Cup Second Round on 24 August 2010, replacing Edgar Davids 82 minutes into their 1–1 draw with Portsmouth at Fratton Park, his team losing 4–3 on penalties. He made his first league appearance the following January, playing the full game and impressing fans in a goalless draw with Norwich City at Selhurst Park.

He joined Barnet on loan in March 2011.

In the 2011–12 season Parsons went on to play six times in all competitions for Crystal Palace.

On 30 August 2012, he joined Wycombe Wanderers on loan for an initial one month youth loan deal.

On 17 January 2014, Parsons joined Plymouth Argyle for an undisclosed fee until the end of the 2013–14 season.
