= Jesse Kewley-Graham =

English footballer

Personal information
- Full name: Jesse James Kewley-Graham
- Date of birth: 15 June 1993 (age 33)
- Place of birth: Isleworth, England
- Position: Midfielder

Team information
- Current team: Walton & Hersham

Youth career
- 2004–2008: Brentford
- 2008–2011: Wycombe Wanderers

Senior career*
Years	Team	Apps	(Gls)
2011–2014	Wycombe Wanderers	21	(0)
2011	→ Staines Town (loan)	5	(0)
2013	→ Havant & Waterlooville (loan)	14	(0)
2013	→ Havant & Waterlooville (loan)	14	(0)
2014–2015	Hampton & Richmond Borough	20	(2)
2016–2018	Hanwell Town	59	(0)
2018–2019	Walton & Hersham	5	(0)
- * Club domestic league appearances and goals as of 22 March 2018

Jesse James Kewley-Graham (born 15 June 1993) is an English footballer who played for Combined Counties Premier Division club Walton & Hersham as a midfielder.

He has also played for Wycombe Wanderers, Staines Town, Havant & Waterlooville, Hampton & Richmond Borough and Hanwell Town.

== Club career ==
=== Wycombe Wanderers ===
Kewley-Graham progressed through the youth ranks at Brentford and Wycombe Wanderers before signing a professional contract in 2011.

On 21 January 2012, he made his professional debut as an injury time substitute in a 3–0 League One win against Rochdale.

He signed a one-year extension in June 2013, and was released upon the expiration of his contract.

==== Staines Town (loan) ====
In October 2011, Kewley-Graham joined Conference South club Staines Town on loan and made his debut in a goalless FA Cup Second Qualifying Round encounter with Beaconsfield SYCOB. His deal was later extended for a second month.

==== Havant & Waterlooville (loan) ====
In January 2013, Kewley-Graham joined Conference South side Havant & Waterlooville on a five-week loan. He returned to the club on a six-month loan in July 2013.

=== Hampton & Richmond Borough ===
Upon his release, Kewley-Graham joined Isthmian League Premier Division club Hampton & Richmond Borough.

On 9 September 2014, he scored his first senior goal in a 6–4 defeat to Leiston. He scored again in the following game in a 2–2 draw at Hendon.

After struggling to break into the team and rejecting the opportunity to go out on loan, chairman Steve McPherson paid up Kewley-Graham's contract in order to release him from the club in January 2015.

=== Hanwell Town ===
In August 2016, Kewley-Graham joined Southern League Division One Central side Hanwell Town. On 14 November 2017, he was sent off in a 5–3 League Cup defeat to Egham Town.

=== Walton & Hersham ===
In January 2018, Kewley-Graham joined Combined Counties Premier Division side Walton & Hersham. He made his debut in a 3–1 defeat to CB Hounslow United on 27 January.

== Statistics ==
As of 22 March 2018

Club	Season	Division	League		FA Cup		League Cup		Other		Total	
Club	Season	Division	Apps	Goals	Apps	Goals	Apps	Goals	Apps	Goals	Apps	Goals
Wycombe Wanderers	2011–12	Football League One	1	0	0	0	0	0	0	0	1	0
Wycombe Wanderers	2012–13	Football League Two	7	0	1	0	0	0	1 (Note: One appearance in the Football League Trophy.)	0	9	0
Wycombe Wanderers	2013–14	Football League Two	0	0	0	0	0	0	0	0	0	0
Wycombe Wanderers	Total		8	0	1	0	0	0	1	0	10	0
Staines Town (loan)	2011–12	Conference South	5	0	0	0	–		0	0	5	0
Havant & Waterlooville (loan)	2012–13	Conference South	9	0	0	0	–		0	0	9	0
Havant & Waterlooville (loan)	2013–14	Conference South	14	0	0	0	–		2	0	16	0
Havant & Waterlooville (loan)	Total		23	0	0	0	–		2	0	25	0
Hampton & Richmond Borough	2014–15	Isthmian League Premier Division	12	2	0	0	–		0	0	12	2
Hanwell Town	2016–17	Southern League Division One Central	28	0	3	1	–		7 (Note: One appearance in the Southern League Cup, three appearances in the FA Trophy, one appearance in the Middlesex Senior Cup and two appearances in the Middlesex Senior Charity Cup.)	0	38	0
Hanwell Town	2017–18	Southern League Division One East	19	0	3	0	–		3 (Note: Two appearances in the Southern Football League Cup and one appearance in the FA Trophy.)	0	25	0
Hanwell Town	Total		47	0	3	0	–		13	0	63	0
Walton & Hersham	2017–18	Combined Counties Premier Division	5	0	0	0	–		2 (Note: Two appearances in the Combined Counties Challenge Cup.)	0	7	0
Career total			100	2	7	1	0	0	15	0	122	3
