= Nikki Bull =

English football player and manager (born 1981)

Personal information
- Full name: Nikki Bull
- Date of birth: 2 October 1981 (age 45)
- Place of birth: Hastings, England
- Height: 6 ft 1 in (1.85 m)
- Position: Goalkeeper

Youth career
- 1996–1998: Aston Villa
- 1998–2000: Queens Park Rangers

Senior career*
Years	Team	Apps	(Gls)
2000–2002	Queens Park Rangers	0	(0)
2002	→ Hayes (loan)	7	(0)
2002–2009	Aldershot Town	267	(1)
2009–2010	Brentford	6	(0)
2010–2012	Wycombe Wanderers	114	(0)
2014–2016	Margate	69	(1)
2018–2021	Leatherhead	3	(0)
Total		466	(2)

International career
2003–2007	England C	4	(0)

Managerial career
- 2015–2017: Margate
- 2018–2021: Leatherhead
- 2022: Guildford City
- * Club domestic league appearances and goals

Nikki Bull (born 2 October 1981) is an English professional footballer who was most recently the manager of Guildford City.

During his playing career, he was a goalkeeper, representing Aldershot Town and Wycombe Wanderers, Queens Park Rangers, Hayes and latterly Margate, whom he also later managed until February 2017.

== Playing career ==
Bull was born in Hastings, East Sussex and moved to Aldershot Town in the summer of 2002 after being released by Queens Park Rangers. In his first season at the club, he was named player of the year and scored his solitary goal for the club. A penalty in the final home match was secured as promotion to the Football Conference. He again won the Player of the Year trophy in the 2005–06 season.

In Aldershot's double-winning promotion season, Bull was named Goalkeeper of the Year and Non-League footballer of the Year by his peers. Despite his success, he said that he would leave Aldershot no matter what happened, and this was confirmed by the club at the end of the season. However, on 27 May 2008 it was announced that Bull would be staying on at Aldershot for a further two years. Bull played for Aldershot Town in their first game in the Football League against Accrington Stanley on 9 August 2008, which was won 1–0. He agreed to leave Aldershot at the end of July 2009 to pursue a career outside of football. However, he instead opted to continue his football career, and signed for Brentford on 3 August 2009. The following year, he turned down the offer of a further one-year contract with the Bees, and instead agreed on a similar deal with Wycombe Wanderers on 7 June 2010. On 29 July 2010, Bull put in an outstanding performance against a Chelsea reserve side, making a very large number of saves and hampering Chelsea's efforts to score, which played a huge part in Wycombe's eventual 5–1 victory.

On 25 April 2011, Bull saved a penalty in a match against Crewe Alexandra at Adams Park. His save prevented Crewe from equalising and Wycombe went on to win 2–0. Bull played every first team game in both league and cup and was rewarded by winning both the supporters' and players' player of the year awards.

On 9 August 2011, Wycombe were involved in a penalty shootout against Colchester United in the first round of the League Cup. Wycombe won 5–4 on penalties after Bull saved a penalty in the shootout. On 8 November 2012, Bull left Wycombe by mutual consent.

After being out of football for 18 months, Bull signed for Isthmian League side, Margate.

Bull scored an injury time equaliser in the Kent derby at Tonbridge Angels on Boxing Day 2014. He also captained the side for the latter part of the season as Margate were promoted to the National League South via the play-offs after beating Hendon 1–0 and won the Players' Player of the Season award in 2014–15.

== Managerial career ==
In December 2015, Bull was appointed manager of Margate until the end of the 2015–16 season. His appointment was subsequently extended until the end of the 2017–18 season. He resigned from his post in February 2017.

On 11 May 2018, Bull was appointed as first-team manager of Isthmian League Premier Division side Leatherhead on a two-year contract. Likewise with his spell at Margate, Bull will continue as a player/manager. On 10 October 2021, Leatherhead parted company with Bull by mutual consent, with the club bottom of the Isthmian League Premier Division after only one league win since the opening day of the season.

On 29 January 2022, he was named as the new manager of Combined Counties Football League Premier Division South side Guildford City, with his first game coming against Colliers Wood United. He resigned after only five weeks in the role.

== Honours ==
Aldershot Town

- Conference National: 2008

Wycombe Wanderers

- League Two (promotion): 2011
