= Leon Johnson (footballer) =

Footballer (born 1981)

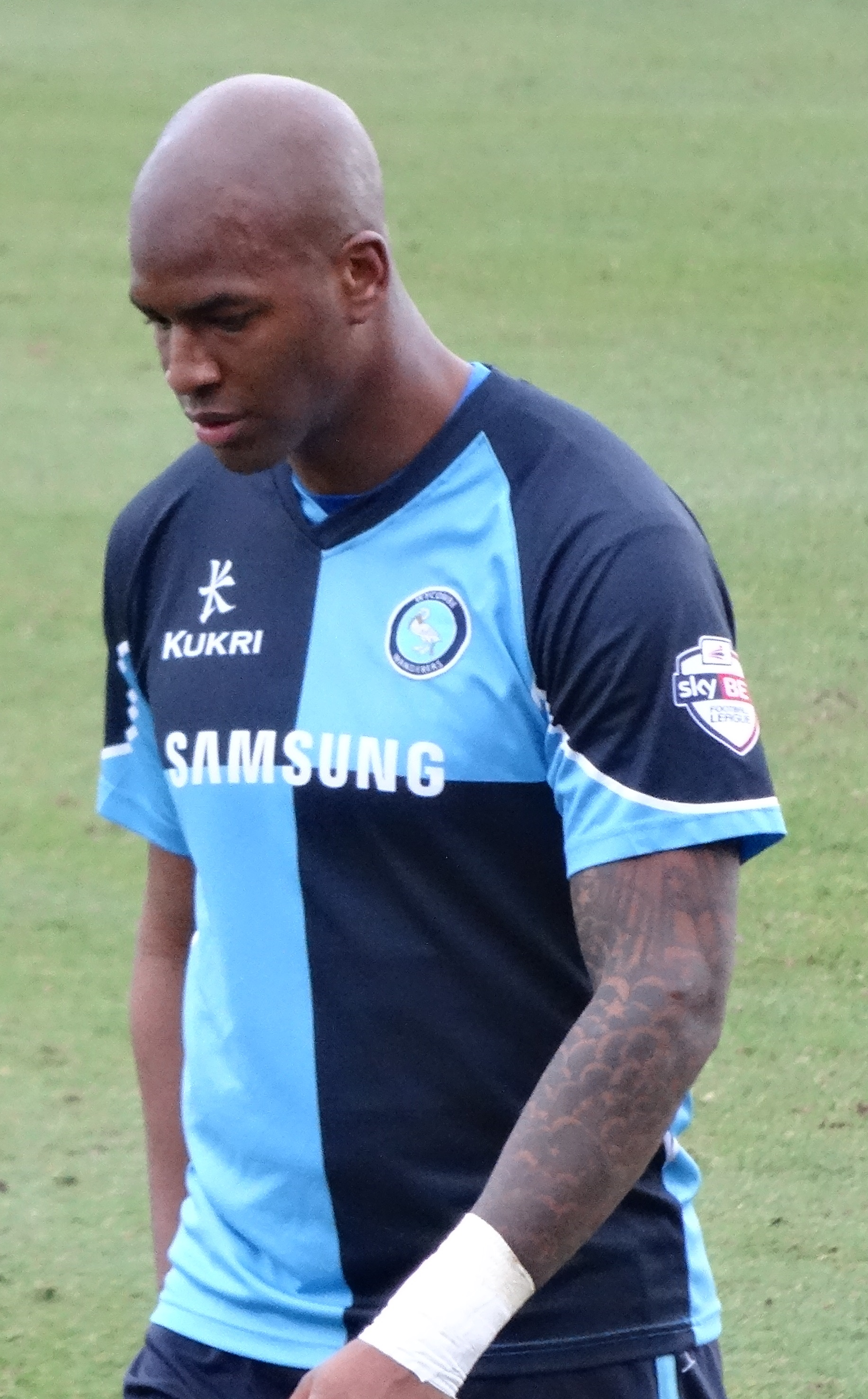
- Johnson playing for Wycombe Wanderers in 2014

Personal information
- Full name: Leon Dean Johnson
- Date of birth: 10 May 1981 (age 45)
- Place of birth: Shoreditch, England
- Position: Defender

Senior career*
| Years | Team | Apps | (Gls) |
| 1998–2002 | Southend United | 48 | (3) |
| 2002–2007 | Gillingham | 98 | (2) |
| 2007–2014 | Wycombe Wanderers | 178 | (4) |
| Total | | 324 | (9) |

International career
| 2011 | Grenada | 5 | (0) |
- * Club domestic league appearances and goals

Leon Dean Johnson (born 10 May 1981) is a professional footballer who played as a defender, most notably for Wycombe Wanderers. Born in England, he made five appearances for the Grenada national team at international level.

== Club career ==
Born in London, Johnson came through the youth ranks at his first professional club, Southend United. He made his professional debut when he started the Football League Trophy match for Southend at home to Cheltenham Town in 1999. Southend lost 1–0 to go out of the cup, and Johnson played no more part in the 1999–2000 season. At the end of September in the 2000–01 season, Johnson came on as a substitute in the 1–0 win at Rochdale. By the end of January, Johnson had established himself as a decent defender and he played in a total of 26 games and scored his first goal in a 1–1 draw with Chesterfield at the Recreation Ground.

In the 2001–02 season, Johnson made 34 appearances for Southend in all competitions. However, as Southend only finished 12th in League One, cost-cutting meant that Johnson was released from the Roots Hall club on a free transfer. He spent time on trial at nearby club Gillingham during the close-season summer of 2002. Johnson impressed in several friendlies for the Gills who soon signed him up on a full-time contract.

Johnson was not seen as first choice for the Gills at the beginning of his career. His first competitive appearance in a Gills shirt came in the middle of September as a late substitute for David Perpetuini. Despite making 20 appearances that season (18 in the league) as Gillingham finished a record high of 11th in the league. He never established himself as a first team regular, however and he only made 21 appearances the next season and only eight the season after that.

It was, however, the 2005–06 season that saw Johnson stake a claim for a regular first team spot. Johnson made around 30 appearances in total, and perhaps would have made more were it not for three suspensions (two following red cards, one following his fifth booking of the season). Johnson scored his first goal for Gillingham against Milton Keynes Dons on New Year's Eve 2005 in a 3–0 win at Priestfield when he headed home Andrew Crofts' flick on following Michael Flynn's long ball.

=== Wycombe Wanderers ===
He was released by Gillingham in May 2007 and signed for Wycombe the following month. Johnson was a regular in the Wycombe team throughout the season and was awarded at the end of the year with the Fans' Player of the Year Award. He went on to sign a one-year extension, which kept him at the club until the summer of 2010. He then once again extended his contract for a further two years. He has been involved in two promotions at the club, having three managers in his spell at the club. In May 2014 Johnson was released after a series of injuries following Wycombe's final day league survival. When he left he had the second highest league appearance and fourth highest appearance total of any player at the club.

== International career ==
Born in England, Johnson qualifies to play for Grenada through his father. On 20 May 2011, he was included in the Grenada squad for the 2011 Gold Cup. Johnson played in all three of Grenada's games in the group stage, but the team was eliminated from the tournament after three heavy defeats.
