= 2000–01 Barnsley F.C. season =

Barnsley
2000–01 season
- Chairman: John Dennis
- Manager: Dave Bassett (until 19 December); Nigel Spackman (from 8 January)
- Stadium: Oakwell
- First Division: 16th
- FA Cup: Third round
- League Cup: Third round
- Top goalscorer: League: Bruce Dyer and Neil Shipperley (14); All: Neil Shipperley (16)
- Average home league attendance: 14,465
Home colours

During the 2000–01 English football season, Barnsley F.C. competed in the Football League First Division.

== Season summary ==
With Craig Hignett and Nicky Eaden departing, manager Dave Bassett brought in inexperienced Carl Regan and Lee Jones to bolster the squad in the hopes that Barnsley would finally return to the Premiership. However, Barnsley's increasingly rapid turnover of managers was to continue during the season with Bassett leaving in December, a surprise decision to most. Nigel Spackman was brought in to replace Bassett, and the team eventually finished in sixteenth position, above Sheffield Wednesday by virtue of goal difference.

== Final league table ==
Pos	Team	Pld	W	D	L	GF	GA	GD	Pts
14	Crewe Alexandra	46	15	10	21	47	62	−15	55
15	Norwich City	46	14	12	20	46	58	−12	54
16	Barnsley	46	15	9	22	49	62	−13	54
17	Sheffield Wednesday	46	15	8	23	52	71	−19	53
18	Grimsby Town	46	14	10	22	43	62	−19	52

Rules for classification: 1) Points; 2) Goal difference; 3) Goals scored

== Results ==
Barnsley's score comes first

=== Legend ===
Win	Draw	Loss

=== Football League First Division ===
Date	Opponent	Venue	Result	Attendance	Scorers
12 August 2000	Norwich City	H	1–0	15,640	Jones
19 August 2000	Watford	A	0–1	13,186	
26 August 2000	West Bromwich Albion	H	4–1	14,321	Jones (2), Shipperley (2)
28 August 2000	Birmingham City	A	1–4	17,160	Appleby
10 September 2000	Fulham	A	1–5	10,437	Appleby
12 September 2000	Crystal Palace	A	0–1	16,297	
16 September 2000	Queens Park Rangers	H	4–2	12,763	Darlington (own goal), Shipperley, van der Laan, Dyer
23 September 2000	Crewe Alexandra	A	2–2	5,738	Barnard (pen), Dyer
30 September 2000	Grimsby Town	H	2–0	13,096	Chettle, Shipperley
6 October 2000	Huddersfield Town	A	1–1	13,556	Kozluk (own goal)
14 October 2000	Nottingham Forest	H	3–4	14,831	Shipperley (2), Dyer
17 October 2000	Tranmere Rovers	H	1–1	12,412	Barnard (pen)
21 October 2000	Gillingham	A	0–0	9,030	
24 October 2000	Wolverhampton Wanderers	H	1–2	13,393	McClare
27 October 2000	Preston North End	A	2–1	13,566	Dyer, Sheron
5 November 2000	Wimbledon	H	0–1	13,641	
8 November 2000	Blackburn Rovers	H	1–2	13,622	Ripley
11 November 2000	Bolton Wanderers	A	0–2	13,406	
18 November 2000	Sheffield Wednesday	H	1–0	19,989	Dyer
25 November 2000	Portsmouth	H	1–0	12,853	Dyer
2 December 2000	Wolverhampton Wanderers	A	0–2	17,340	
9 December 2000	Sheffield United	H	0–0	16,780	
16 December 2000	Stockport County	A	0–2	5,383	
23 December 2000	Norwich City	A	0–0	16,581	
26 December 2000	Burnley	H	1–0	18,725	Morgan
29 December 2000	Watford	H	0–1	13,820	
1 January 2001	West Bromwich Albion	A	0–1	19,423	
13 January 2001	Birmingham City	H	2–3	13,631	Dyer, Jones
20 January 2001	Burnley	A	1–2	15,380	Hayward
3 February 2001	Blackburn Rovers	A	0–0	18,573	
10 February 2001	Fulham	H	0–0	14,654	
17 February 2001	Queens Park Rangers	A	0–2	9,388	
20 February 2001	Crystal Palace	H	1–0	12,909	Shipperley
24 February 2001	Crewe Alexandra	H	3–0	13,175	Jones, Wright (own goal), Shipperley
3 March 2001	Grimsby Town	A	2–0	5,996	Dyer (2)
7 March 2001	Nottingham Forest	A	0–1	18,788	
10 March 2001	Huddersfield Town	H	3–1	15,290	Dyer (2), Shipperley
17 March 2001	Tranmere Rovers	A	3–2	8,484	Dyer, Shipperley, Rankin
25 March 2001	Gillingham	H	3–1	13,609	Dyer (2), Shipperley (pen)
31 March 2001	Stockport County	H	0–2	13,203	
7 April 2001	Sheffield United	A	2–1	22,811	Bullock, Shipperley
14 April 2001	Wimbledon	A	1–1	7,609	Shipperley
16 April 2001	Preston North End	H	0–4	16,361	
21 April 2001	Sheffield Wednesday	A	1–2	23,498	Shipperley
28 April 2001	Bolton Wanderers	H	0–1	13,979	
6 May 2001	Portsmouth	A	0–3	13,064	

=== FA Cup ===
Round	Date	Opponent	Venue	Result	Attendance	Goalscorers
R3	6 January 2001	Leeds United	A	0–1	32,386	

=== League Cup ===
Round	Date	Opponent	Venue	Result	Attendance	Goalscorers
R1 1st Leg	22 August 2000	Rotherham United	A	1–0	4,940	Barnard
R1 2nd Leg	5 September 2000	Rotherham United	H	3–2 (won 4–2 on agg)	8,088	Sheron (2), Barnard
R2 1st Leg	19 September 2000	Crewe Alexandra	H	4–0	5,005	Dyer, van der Laan, Sheron (2)
R2 2nd Leg	26 September 2000	Crewe Alexandra	A	3–0 (won 7–0 on agg)	1,775	Shipperley (2), Sheron
R3	1 November 2000	Stoke City	A	2–3	10,480	Corbo, Jones

== Squad ==
Squad at end of season

Note: Flags indicate national team as defined under FIFA eligibility rules; some limited exceptions apply. Players may hold more than one non-FIFA nationality.

No.	Pos.	Nation	Player
2	DF	ENG	Carl Regan
3	MF	ENG	Matty Appleby
4	DF	ENG	Mitch Ward
5	MF	ENG	Steve Hayward
6	DF	FIN	Janne Salli
7	MF	RSA	Eric Tinkler
8	FW	WAL	Lee Jones
9	FW	ENG	Neil Shipperley
10	FW	ENG	Bruce Dyer
11	MF	ENG	Darren Barnard
12	FW	ENG	Mike Sheron
13	GK	ENG	Leigh Walker
14	MF	ENG	Martin Bullock
16	DF	ENG	Lee Crooks
17	MF	ENG	Sean McClare
18	DF	ENG	Chris Morgan
19	DF	ENG	Antony Kay
20	GK	ENG	Kevin Miller

No.	Pos.	Nation	Player
21	MF	SCO	Alex Neil
22	DF	IRL	Brian O'Callaghan
23	MF	ENG	Carl Barrowclough
24	DF	SCO	James Dudgeon
25	DF	ENG	Kevin Austin
26	MF	ENG	Ricky Ravenhill
27	DF	ENG	Chris Barker
28	DF	SCO	Keith Brown
29	FW	NZL	Rory Fallon
30	DF	URU	Mateo Corbo
31	DF	ENG	Steve Chettle
33	DF	NZL	Dave Mulligan
34	MF	NZL	Leo Bertos
35	DF	ENG	Jon Parkin
36	GK	ENG	Richard Siddall
37	FW	ENG	Isaiah Rankin
40	GK	WAL	Andy Marriott

=== Left club during season ===
Note: Flags indicate national team as defined under FIFA eligibility rules; some limited exceptions apply. Players may hold more than one non-FIFA nationality.

No.	Pos.	Nation	Player
1	GK	ENG	David Watson (retired)
5	DF	ENG	Adie Moses (on loan from Stockport County)
6	DF	ENG	Scott Jones (to Bristol Rovers)
15	MF	NED	Robbie van der Laan (Retired)
16	MF	ENG	Geoff Thomas (to Notts County)

No.	Pos.	Nation	Player
23	FW	ENG	Mike Turner (to Doncaster Rovers)
32	MF	ENG	Ian Woan (to Swindon Town)
32	MF	ENG	Neil Maddison (on loan from Middlesbrough)
35	MF	ENG	Stuart Ripley (on loan from Southampton)
—	DF	SCO	Jim Lauchlan (on loan from Kilmarnock)
