= 2002–03 Barnsley F.C. season =

Barnsley
2002–03 season
- Manager: Steve Parkin (until 15 October 2002); Glyn Hodges (from 15 October 2002)
- Stadium: Oakwell Stadium
- Second Division: 19th
- FA Cup: First round
- League Cup: First round
- FL Trophy: Second round

During the 2002–03 season, Barnsley competed in the Football League Second Division, in which they finished 19th. They also competed in the FA Cup and Football League Cup, where they were eliminated in the first round, and Football League Trophy, from which they were eliminated in the second round.

== Second Division ==
=== League table ===
Pos	Team	Pld	W	D	L	GF	GA	GD	Pts	Promotion or relegation
17	Port Vale	46	14	11	21	54	70	−16	53	
18	Wycombe Wanderers	46	13	13	20	59	66	−7	52	
19	Barnsley	46	13	13	20	51	64	−13	52	
20	Chesterfield	46	14	8	24	43	73	−30	50	
21	Cheltenham Town (R)	46	10	18	18	53	68	−15	48	Relegation to Football League Third Division

Rules for classification: In the Football League goals scored (GF) takes precedence over goal difference (GD).
(R) Relegated

=== Matches ===
Second Division match details
Date	Opponents	Venue	Result	Score F–A	Scorers	Attendance
10 August 2002	Swindon Town	A	L	1–3	Lumsdon 30' pen.	5,702
13 August 2002	Cheltenham Town	H	D	1–1	Dyer 51'	9,641
17 August 2002	Queens Park Rangers	H	W	1–0	Lumsdon 57'	9,626
24 August 2002	Luton Town	A	W	3–2	Perrett 20' o.g., Sheron 43', Dyer 58'	6,230
26 August 2002	Notts County	H	D	0–0		10,431
31 August 2002	Northampton Town	A	L	0–1		5,004
7 September 2002	Huddersfield Town	A	L	0–1		11,989
14 September 2002	Plymouth Argyle	H	D	1–1	Dyer 10'	9,134
17 September 2002	Blackpool	H	W	2–1	Sheron 31', Fallon 76'	9,619
21 September 2002	Stockport County	A	L	1–4	Fallon 28'	5,690
28 September 2002	Wigan Athletic	H	L	1–3	Betsy 66'	9,977
5 October 2002	Brentford	A	W	2–1	Betsy 14', 81'	5,394
12 October 2002	Bristol City	H	L	1–4	Bertos 49'	10,495
19 October 2002	Tranmere Rovers	A	L	0–1		6,855
26 October 2002	Wycombe Wanderers	H	D	1–1	Fallon 33'	10,044
29 October 2002	Colchester United	A	D	1–1	Dyer 15'	3,096
2 November 2002	Chesterfield	A	L	0–1		4,676
9 November 2002	Cardiff City	H	W	3–2	Morgan 22', 64', Fallon 30'	10,894
23 November 2002	Peterborough United	A	W	3–1	Sheron 35', 38', Dyer 90'	4,449
30 November 2002	Oldham Athletic	H	D	2–2	Sheron 28', Dyer 89'	11,222
14 December 2002	Crewe Alexandra	A	L	0–2		5,633
21 December 2002	Mansfield Town	H	L	0–1		10,495
26 December 2002	Notts County	A	L	2–3	Betsy 1', Dyer 62'	7,413
28 December 2002	Port Vale	H	W	2–1	Fallon 12', Gibbs 79' pen.	9,291
1 January 2003	Northampton Town	H	L	1–2	Lumsdon 24'	9,531
11 January 2003	Queens Park Rangers	A	L	0–1		11,217
18 January 2003	Luton Town	H	L	2–3	Betsy 1', Dyer 76' pen.	9,079
25 January 2003	Port Vale	A	D	0–0		4,033
1 February 2003	Swindon Town	H	D	1–1	Fallon 14'	8,661
8 February 2003	Cardiff City	A	D	1–1	Dyer 52' pen.	12,759
15 February 2003	Chesterfield	H	W	2–1	Fallon 20', Dyer 33'	9,373
18 February 2003	Cheltenham Town	A	W	3–1	Sheron 18', Dyer 63', Ga. Jones 90'	3,568
22 February 2003	Huddersfield Town	H	L	0–1		12,474
1 March 2003	Plymouth Argyle	A	D	1–1	Dyer 66'	8,228
4 March 2003	Blackpool	A	W	2–1	Sheron 41', 62'	6,827
8 March 2003	Stockport County	H	W	1–0	Dyer 10'	9,177
15 March 2003	Wycombe Wanderers	A	D	2–2	Sheron 76', Dyer 86'	5,931
18 March 2003	Tranmere Rovers	H	D	1–1	Dyer 8'	8,786
22 March 2003	Colchester United	H	D	1–1	Dyer 36'	9,154
29 March 2003	Bristol City	A	L	0–2		10,232
5 April 2003	Oldham Athletic	A	L	1–2	Mulligan 21'	6,191
12 April 2003	Peterborough United	H	L	1–2	Dyer 15' pen.	8,862
19 April 2003	Mansfield Town	A	W	1–0	O'Callaghan 31'	4,873
21 April 2003	Crewe Alexandra	H	L	1–2	Ince 33' o.g.	9,396
26 April 2003	Brentford	H	W	1–0	Rankin 90'	9,065
3 May 2003	Wigan Athletic	A	L	0–1		12,537

== FA Cup ==
FA Cup match details
Round	Date	Opponents	Venue	Result	Score F–A	Scorers	Attendance
First round	16 November 2002	Blackpool	H	L	1–4	Dyer 17'	6,857

== League Cup ==
League Cup match details
Round	Date	Opponents	Venue	Result	Score F–A	Scorers	Attendance
First round	11 September 2002	Macclesfield Town	A	L	1–4	Rankin 84'	1,720

== Football League Trophy ==
Football League Trophy match details
Round	Date	Opponents	Venue	Result	Score F–A	Scorers	Attendance
Second round	12 November 2002	Bury	A	L	0–1		1,366

== Appearances and goals ==
Numbers in parentheses denote appearances as substitute.
Players with names struck through and marked † left the club during the playing season.
Players with names in italics and marked * were on loan from another club for the whole of their season with Barnsley.
Key to positions: GK – Goalkeeper; DF – Defender; MF – Midfielder; FW – Forward

Players included in matchday squads
No.	Pos.	Nat.	Name	Second Division		FA Cup		League Cup		FL Trophy		Total	
No.	Pos.	Nat.	Name	Apps	Goals	Apps	Goals	Apps	Goals	Apps	Goals	Apps	Goals
1	GK	ENG	~~Andy Marriott~~ †	36	0	1	0	1	0	0	0	38	0
1	GK	ENG	~~Martin Taylor~~ *†	3	0	0	0	0	0	0	0	3	0
2	MF	ENG	Nicky Wroe	1	0	0	0	0	0	0	0	1	0
3	DF	ENG	~~Andy Holt~~ *†	4 (3)	0	0	0	1	0	0	0	5 (3)	0
4	MF	ENG	Mitch Ward	22 (4)	0	0	0	1	0	0	0	23 (4)	0
5	DF	ENG	Chris Morgan	36	2	1	0	0	0	1	0	38	2
6	DF	ENG	~~Mike Flynn~~ †	13 (1)	0	0	0	0	0	0	0	13 (1)	0
7	MF	ENG	Kevin Donovan	20 (2)	0	0	0	0	0	0	0	20 (2)	0
8	MF	ENG	Chris Lumsdon	21 (4)	3	1	0	1	0	1	0	24 (4)	3
9	FW	ENG	Mike Sheron	28 (6)	9	0 (1)	0	0 (1)	0	1	0	29 (8)	9
10	FW	ENG	Bruce Dyer	39 (1)	17	1	1	1	0	0	0	41 (1)	18
11	MF	SUR	Dean Gorré	18 (9)	0	0	0	0	0	1	0	19 (9)	0
12	FW	ENG	Isaiah Rankin	1 (8)	1	0	0	1	1	0	0	2 (8)	2
13	GK	ENG	Matthew Ghent	7	0	0 (1)	0	0	0	1	0	8 (1)	0
14	MF	SCO	Alex Neil	30 (3)	0	1	0	0	0	1	0	32 (3)	0
16	DF	ENG	Lee Crooks	10 (8)	0	0	0	0	0	0	0	10 (8)	0
17	DF	IRL	Brian O'Callaghan	12 (2)	1	0	0	1	0	0	0	13 (2)	1
18	MF	ENG	Gary Jones	31	1	0	0	1	0	0	0	32	1
19	MF	ENG	Steve Hayward	6	0	0	0	0	0	0	0	6	0
20	MF	SEY	Kevin Betsy	32 (7)	5	1	0	1	0	1	0	35 (7)	5
21	DF	ENG	Paul Gibbs	23 (3)	1	1	0	0	0	1	0	25 (3)	1
22	DF	NZL	Dave Mulligan	30 (3)	1	1	0	1	0	1	0	33 (3)	1
23	MF	ENG	Carl Barrowclough	0 (5)	0	0	0	0	0	0	0	0 (5)	0
24	DF	ENG	Antony Kay	13 (3)	0	0	0	0	0	1	0	14 (3)	0
25	MF	NZL	Leo Bertos	2 (4)	1	0	0	0	0	0	0	2 (4)	1
27	FW	NZL	Rory Fallon	18 (8)	7	1	0	0 (1)	0	1	0	20 (9)	7
28	DF	ENG	Neil Austin	32 (2)	0	1	0	0	0	0	0	33 (2)	0
31	DF	ENG	~~Keith Curle~~ †	11	0	0	0	1	0	0	0	12	0
32	DF	ENG	Robbie Williams	7 (1)	0	1	0	0	0	0 (1)	0	8 (2)	0
33	FW	ENG	Griff Jones	0 (2)	0	0	0	0	0	0 (1)	0	0 (3)	0

Players not included in matchday squads
No.	Pos.	Nat.	Name
2	DF	ENG	~~Carl Regan~~ †
3	DF	ENG	Adam Oldham
15	MF	ENG	Kevin Dixon
26	MF	NZL	~~Jeremy Christie~~ †
29	FW	ENG	Ashley Scothern
30	DF	ENG	James Dudgeon
34	GK	ENG	Craig Parry
35	MF	ENG	Dale Tonge
