= 2001–02 Barnsley F.C. season =

Barnsley
2001–02 season
- Chairman: John Dennis
- Manager: Nigel Spackman (until 25 October); Glyn Hodges (caretaker until 9 November); Steve Parkin (from 9 November)
- Stadium: Oakwell
- First Division: 23rd (relegated)
- FA Cup: Third round
- League Cup: Third round
- Top goalscorer: League: Dyer (14); All: Dyer (18)
- Average home league attendance: 13,292

During the 2001–02 English football season, Barnsley competed in the Football League First Division.

== Season summary ==
In the 2001–02 season, after a mediocre start with Barnsley reaching eleventh by mid-September, results started to go downhill and the team found themselves hovering around the relegation zone. Following a 3–1 defeat to Sheffield Wednesday at Hillsborough, Spackman and coach Derek Fazackerley were both sacked. Caretaker manager Glyn Hodges won his first game in charge 3–2 against West Bromwich Albion, however two 3–0 defeats followed against Manchester City and Watford.

Then Rochdale boss, Steve Parkin, was appointed full-time manager on 9 November. Barnsley then went on a twelve-game unbeaten league run from December until mid-February which saw them pull clear of the relegation zone, but from then on results went downhill and Barnsley were dragged back into the mire, with Barnsley's away form being particularly poor and were pretty much reliant upon home victories to get valuable points. Despite a battling effort it came down to the final home game of the season, with Barnsley needing a victory against Norwich City to stave off relegation. On 13 April, Barnsley lost 2–0, and were relegated outside the top two flights of English football for the first time in over twenty years.

== Final league table ==
Pos	Team	Pld	W	D	L	GF	GA	GD	Pts	Qualification or relegation
20	Sheffield Wednesday	46	12	14	20	49	71	−22	50	
21	Rotherham United	46	10	19	17	52	66	−14	49	
22	Crewe Alexandra (R)	46	12	13	21	47	76	−29	49	Relegation to the Second Division
23	Barnsley (R)	46	11	15	20	59	86	−27	48	Relegation to the Second Division
24	Stockport County (R)	46	6	8	32	42	102	−60	26	Relegation to the Second Division

Rules for classification: 1) Points; 2) Goal difference; 3) Goals scored
(R) Relegated

== Results ==
Barnsley's score comes first

=== Legend ===
Win	Draw	Loss

=== Football League First Division ===
Date	Opponent	Venue	Result	Attendance	Scorers
11 August 2001	Bradford City	A	0–4	16,367	
18 August 2001	Nottingham Forest	H	2–1	14,203	Gallen, Rankin
25 August 2001	Gillingham	A	0–3	8,292	
27 August 2001	Rotherham United	H	1–1	15,552	Dyer
1 September 2001	Grimsby Town	A	0–1	6,173	
8 September 2001	Stockport County	H	2–2	11,192	Sheron, Briggs (own goal)
15 September 2001	Crewe Alexandra	H	2–0	10,976	Gorré, Neil
18 September 2001	Millwall	A	1–3	10,021	Dyer
22 September 2001	Crystal Palace	A	0–1	15,433	
25 September 2001	Coventry City	H	1–1	11,692	Dyer
28 September 2001	Portsmouth	H	1–4	11,660	Barnard (pen)
13 October 2001	Birmingham City	H	1–3	11,910	Sand
20 October 2001	Burnley	A	3–3	14,690	Morgan, Lumsdon (pen), Barnard
24 October 2001	Sheffield Wednesday	A	1–3	21,008	Gallen
28 October 2001	West Bromwich Albion	H	3–2	12,490	Dyer (2), Lumsdon (pen)
31 October 2001	Manchester City	H	0–3	15,159	
3 November 2001	Watford	A	0–3	13,964	
8 November 2001	Preston North End	A	2–2	19,042	Barnard, Neil
17 November 2001	Wimbledon	H	1–1	11,088	Dyer
24 November 2001	Norwich City	A	1–2	17,333	Barker
27 November 2001	Wolverhampton Wanderers	A	1–4	19,231	Barker
2 December 2001	Sheffield Wednesday	H	3–0	16,714	Morgan, Sheron (2)
8 December 2001	Walsall	H	4–1	12,509	Sheron (2), Dyer, Donovan
14 December 2001	Sheffield United	A	1–1	17,858	Sheron
22 December 2001	Gillingham	H	4–1	11,965	Lumsdon, Barnard, Dyer, G Jones
26 December 2001	Stockport County	A	3–1	6,885	Sheron, Palmer (own goal), Morgan
29 December 2001	Rotherham United	A	1–1	9,737	Swailes (own goal)
1 January 2002	Grimsby Town	H	0–0	13,325	
12 January 2002	Nottingham Forest	A	0–0	18,190	
19 January 2002	Bradford City	H	3–3	13,856	Lumsdon (pen), Sheron (2)
29 January 2002	Wolverhampton Wanderers	H	1–0	13,825	Sheron
2 February 2002	Portsmouth	A	4–4	12,756	Lumsdon (2, 1 pen), Barker, Sheron
9 February 2002	Burnley	H	1–1	14,411	Barnard
16 February 2002	Birmingham City	A	0–1	19,208	
23 February 2002	Coventry City	A	0–4	15,092	
26 February 2002	Crystal Palace	H	1–4	11,207	Dyer
2 March 2002	Millwall	H	1–1	11,816	Lumsdon (pen)
5 March 2002	Crewe Alexandra	A	0–2	6,258	
9 March 2002	Sheffield United	H	1–1	15,430	Dyer
16 March 2002	Walsall	A	1–2	7,495	Dyer
23 March 2002	Watford	H	2–0	12,449	Dyer, Barnard (pen)
30 March 2002	West Bromwich Albion	A	1–3	23,167	Barnard (pen)
1 April 2002	Preston North End	H	2–1	14,188	Gorré, Dyer
6 April 2002	Manchester City	A	1–5	33,628	Dyer
13 April 2002	Norwich City	H	0–2	18,803	
21 April 2002	Wimbledon	A	1–0	5,379	Sheron

=== FA Cup ===
Round	Date	Opponent	Venue	Result	Attendance	Goalscorers
R3	5 January 2002	Blackburn Rovers	H	1–1	12,314	Barnard
R3R	16 January 2002	Blackburn Rovers	A	1–3	10,203	Dyer

=== League Cup ===
Round	Date	Opponent	Venue	Result	Attendance	Goalscorers
R1	21 August 2001	Halifax Town	H	2–0	5,418	Tinkler, Dyer
R2	11 September 2001	Colchester United	A	3–1	3,442	Dyer (2), L Jones
R3	9 October 2001	Newcastle United	H	0–1	14,493	

== Squad ==
Note: Flags indicate national team as defined under FIFA eligibility rules; some limited exceptions apply. Players may hold more than one non-FIFA nationality.

No.	Pos.	Nation	Player
1	GK	WAL	Andy Marriott
2	DF	ENG	Carl Regan
3	DF	ENG	Chris Barker
4	DF	ENG	Mitch Ward
5	DF	ENG	Chris Morgan
6	DF	ENG	Steve Chettle (captain)
7	MF	ENG	Kevin Donovan
9	FW	ENG	Mike Sheron
10	FW	ENG	Bruce Dyer
11	MF	WAL	Darren Barnard
12	FW	ENG	Isaiah Rankin
14	MF	SCO	Alex Neil
15	MF	ENG	Kevin Dixon
16	DF	ENG	Lee Crooks
17	DF	IRL	Brian O'Callaghan
19	MF	ENG	Kevin Betsy
20	GK	ENG	Kevin Miller

No.	Pos.	Nation	Player
22	FW	ENG	Ashley Scothern
23	MF	ENG	Carl Barrowclough
24	DF	ENG	Mike Flynn
25	MF	NZL	Leo Bertos
26	DF	ENG	Paul Gibbs
27	DF	FIN	Janne Salli
29	MF	ENG	Steve Hayward
30	MF	NED	Dean Gorré
31	MF	NZL	Jeremy Christie
32	FW	NZL	Rory Fallon
33	DF	ENG	Antony Kay
34	GK	ENG	Matthew Ghent
36	MF	ENG	Chris Lumsdon
38	DF	NZL	Dave Mulligan
39	DF	ENG	James Dudgeon
40	MF	ENG	Gary Jones

=== Left club during season ===
Note: Flags indicate national team as defined under FIFA eligibility rules; some limited exceptions apply. Players may hold more than one non-FIFA nationality.

No.	Pos.	Nation	Player
37	MF	WAL	John Oster (on loan from Sunderland)
31	FW	WAL	Kevin Gallen (to QPR)
21	MF	SCO	Paul Bernard (Released)
22	MF	ENG	Sean McClare (to Port Vale)
22	FW	SCO	Gary McSwegan (on loan from Hearts)
-	MF	ENG	Ricky Ravenhill (to Doncaster Rovers)
35	MF	DEN	Peter Sand (to Stabæk Fotball)
19	MF	ENG	Matty Appleby (to Oldham Athletic)

No.	Pos.	Nation	Player
26	DF	URU	Mateo Corbo (Released)
37	FW	GRN	Tony Bedeau (on loan from Torquay United)
24	DF	ENG	Jon Parkin (to York City)
28	DF	SCO	Keith Brown (Released)
8	FW	WAL	Lee Jones (to Wrexham)
18	MF	RSA	Eric Tinkler (Released)
8	FW	IRL	Michael Reddy (on loan from Sunderland)
21	FW	ENG	Richard Naylor (on loan from Ipswich Town)
