= Dave Mulligan =

New Zealand footballer (born 1982)

David Mulligan
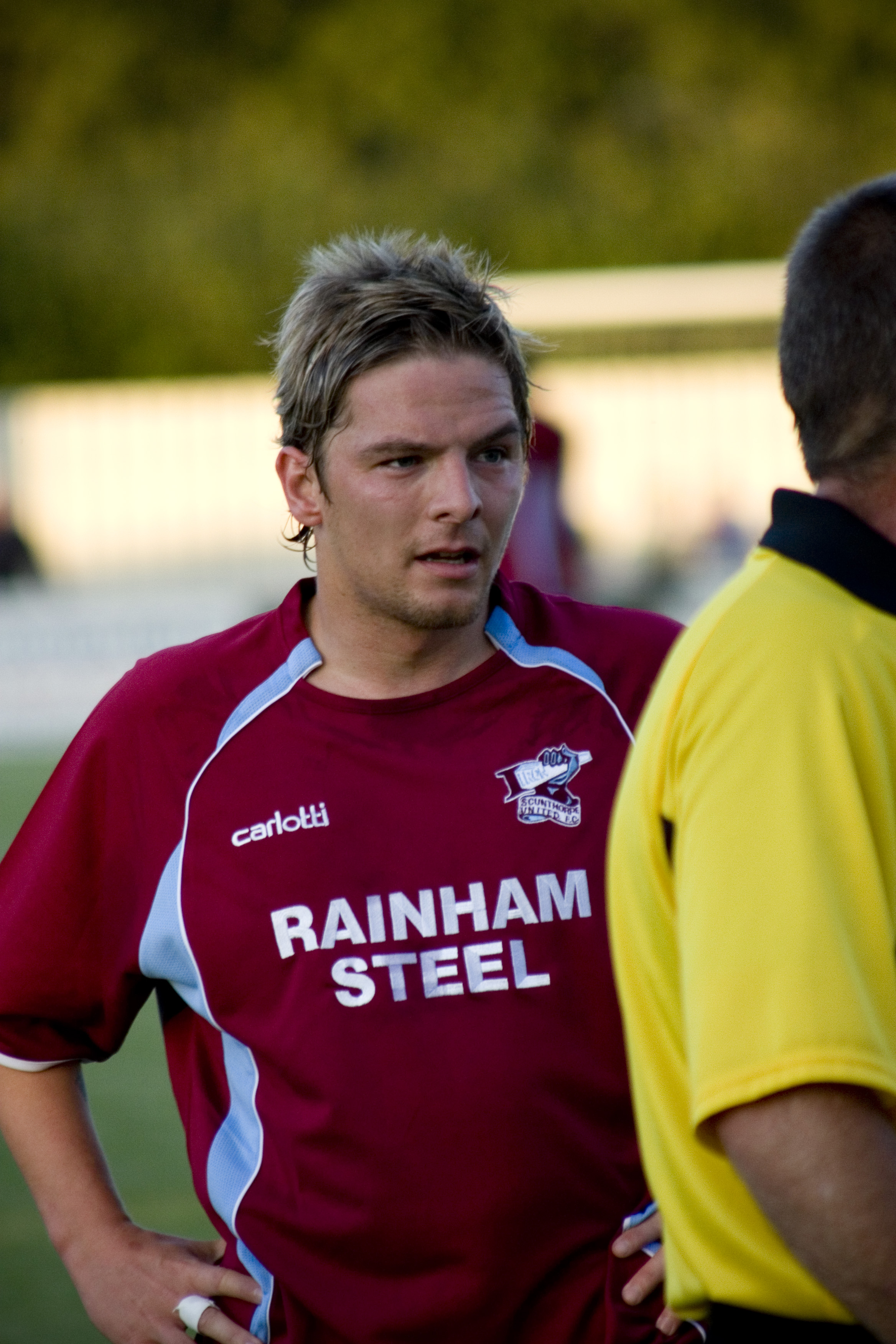
- Mulligan in action for Scunthorpe United in 2007

Personal information
- Full name: David James Mulligan
- Date of birth: 24 March 1982 (age 44)
- Place of birth: Fazakerley, Liverpool, England
- Height: 5 ft 8 in (1.73 m)
- Positions: Midfielder; right-back

Youth career
- 1998–2000: Barnsley

Senior career*
Years	Team	Apps	(Gls)
2000–2003	Barnsley	66	(1)
2004–2006	Doncaster Rovers	77	(4)
2006–2008	Scunthorpe United	24	(1)
2007	→ Grimsby Town (loan)	6	(0)
2008	Port Vale	13	(1)
2008–2010	Wellington Phoenix	3	(0)
2010–2012	Auckland City	22	(9)
2012–2013	Waitakere United	6	(5)
2013–2014	Hawke's Bay United	15	(1)
2014–2015	Waitakere United	11	(2)
Total		243	(24)

International career
1999–1999	New Zealand U-17	3	(2)
- New Zealand U-20
2003–2004	New Zealand U-23		
2002–2010	New Zealand	28	(3)

Managerial career
- 2016–20??: East Coast Bays
- * Club domestic league appearances and goals

David James Mulligan (born 24 March 1982) is a New Zealand former football player and head coach.

Born in England, he began his career at Barnsley, making his first-team debut in October 2001. He became a first-team regular in the 2001–02 and 2002–03 seasons before joining Doncaster Rovers in February 2004. He helped the club to the Third Division title in the 2003–04 campaign. He was signed to Scunthorpe United in June 2006 and won the League One title with the club in 2006–07. He was loaned out to Grimsby Town in November 2007 and took a free transfer to Port Vale in January 2008. He returned to New Zealand six months later to sign with A-League club Wellington Phoenix. He joined New Zealand Football Championship club Auckland City in 2010. He helped the club to two successive OFC Champions League titles before he moved to Waitakere United in 2012 and Hawke's Bay United in 2013. He returned to Waitakere United the next year.

He earned national representation at under-17, under-20, under-23 and full international level. He was selected for two FIFA Confederations Cup competitions and was also named in the 2010 FIFA World Cup squad. He earned 28 senior caps and scored three goals in World Cup qualification matches with Vanuatu.

He began his coaching career as head coach at East Coast Bays in October 2016.

== Club career ==
=== Barnsley ===
Mulligan was born in Liverpool, England, but his family moved to New Zealand when he was five. He returned to England at the age of 16, along with Rory Fallon, to join the youth team at Barnsley; the move had been arranged by Rory's father Kevin, who was an assistant to New Zealand head coach John Adshead. He made his professional debut for the club under Glyn Hodges's caretaker stewardship in a 3–0 defeat to Manchester City at Oakwell on 31 October 2001. Steve Parkin's "Tykes" were relegated out of the First Division at the end of the 2001–02 season, but Mulligan retained his place in the Second Division for the 2002–03 campaign. He scored his first senior goal in a 2–1 defeat at Oldham Athletic on 5 April 2003. However, he lost his first-team place under Guðjón Þórðarson early in the 2003–04 campaign and was released by Barnsley in October 2003, despite having been offered a new contract just five months earlier.

=== Doncaster Rovers ===
Mulligan had an unsuccessful trial at Sheffield United during four months without a club. He joined Third Division leaders Doncaster Rovers in February 2004, initially on a match-to-match basis, then on a short-term contract, before he was rewarded with a two-year contract after Doncaster won promotion as champions at the end of the 2003–04 season. He quickly established himself at the Keepmoat Stadium, but again ran into trouble early into the 2004–05 season, being placed on the transfer list by "Donny" in November 2004. He went nowhere however, and on 29 November he provided an assist in a 3–0 victory over Premier League side Aston Villa in the League Cup. On 4 December, he scored two free kicks – from 25 yards (23 m) and 20 yards (18 m) – in a 2–1 win over Boston United in the FA Cup. He remained a regular starter up until the end of the 2005–06 campaign. The utility player was offered a contract by manager Dave Penney in the summer of 2006, but the two sides failed to agree terms.

=== Scunthorpe United ===
In June 2006, Mulligan signed for League One side Scunthorpe United, having met manager Brian Laws at a M180 motorway service station to discuss the situation at Glanford Park. He made 29 appearances throughout the 2006–07 season as Scunthorpe secured promotion as champions of League One. However, he never took to the field in the Championship due to differences with manager Nigel Adkins; he had been involved in a car accident and been late to training, and also had to miss games due to international commitments. He joined League Two side Grimsby Town on a one-month loan on 30 August 2007. He made his debut for the "Mariners" on 2 September, in a 2–1 defeat at Shrewsbury Town, coming onto the pitch as a 36th-minute substitute only to be taken off after 63 minutes; he said this was typical bizarre management from Alan Buckley, who made players come to Blundell Park for sprint training on days after games.

=== Port Vale ===
He joined Port Vale on a free transfer in January 2008. He made 13 appearances in the 2007–08 season as the "Valiants" were relegated out of League One; he scored a free kick on the last day of the season in a 1–1 draw at Southend United. His stay at Vale Park was to prove a relatively short one as manager Lee Sinnott declined to offer Mulligan a longer contract.

=== New Zealand ===
Mulligan signed a two-year contract with the Wellington Phoenix in July 2008. However, he struggled to make an impact and made just three appearances for the club in two seasons before his contract was not renewed at the end of the 2009–10 season. He later commented, "I always had an idea of coming back to New Zealand. It was more of the lifestyle change, rather than football. There’s nothing better than playing football in the sun!"

Mulligan soon signed on with New Zealand Football Championship club Auckland City for the 2010–11 season. He made his debut in the opening round match against Waikato in which he scored two goals in the second half, to give the "Navy Blues" a 3–2 victory. He played both legs of the 2011 final of the OFC Champions League, as Auckland beat Amicale (Vanuatu) 6–1 on aggregate. Auckland won the Champions League for a second-successive season in 2012, and this time Mulligan scored one of the goals in a 3–1 aggregate win over AS Tefana (French Polynesia). He switched to rivals Waitakere United in July 2012. The club won the Premiership in 2012–13. He moved on to Hawke's Bay United in October 2013, and helped the club to a third-place finish in 2013–14. He returned to Waitakere United for the 2014–15 season, who finished the season in fourth place.

== International career ==
Mulligan played for NZ Under-17 at the 1999 FIFA U-17 World Championship and scored two goals in their two pool matches against the United States and Poland. Mulligan played for NZ Under-23 at the 2004 Athens Olympics qualification tournament for the Oceania Football Confederation, however, New Zealand lost out to Australia and did not qualify for the Olympics.

He made his debut for "All Whites" in an international friendly against Estonia on 13 October 2002, which ended in a 3–2 defeat. He was named in the 2003 FIFA Confederations Cup squad in France by head coach Mick Waitt. He was also in the 2004 OFC Nations Cup squad and played in the 3–0 win over the Solomon Islands. He scored in a 2–1 win at Vanuatu in a World Cup qualifier on 17 November 2007 and also scored a brace in the return fixture four days later. He featured in all six games of the 2008 OFC Nations Cup, which New Zealand won ahead of New Caledonia, Fiji and Vanuatu.

He was named part of the New Zealand squad for the 2009 FIFA Confederations Cup in June 2009. He made two starting appearances at right-back in defeats to Spain and South Africa, as well as a substitute appearance in the 0–0 draw with Iraq. Mulligan was named in New Zealand's final 23-man squad to compete at the 2010 FIFA World Cup in South Africa; he had been selected by head coach Ricki Herbert despite Herbert having released him at Wellington Phoenix. However, he did not feature in any of the games in the tournament itself.

== Style of play ==
Mulligan was a two-footed player, able to play in midfield or at right-back. He was an accomplished free kick taker.

== Coaching career ==
Mulligan was appointed as head coach at Northern League club East Coast Bays in October 2016.

== Personal life ==
He married Michelle, and the couple had their first child, Eden-Lily, in February 2017.

== Career statistics ==
=== Club statistics ===
Appearances and goals by club, season and competition
Club	Season	League			National cup (Note: Includes FA Cup, Australia Cup, Chatham Cup)		League cup (Note: Includes Football League Cup)		Other		Total	
Club	Season	Division	Apps	Goals	Apps	Goals	Apps	Goals	Apps	Goals	Apps	Goals
Barnsley	2000–01	First Division	0	0	0	0	0	0	—		0	0
Barnsley	2001–02	First Division	28	0	2	0	0	0	—		30	0
Barnsley	2002–03	Second Division	34	1	1	0	0	0	1 (Note: Appearance(s) in the EFL Trophy.)	0	36	1
Barnsley	2003–04	Second Division	4	0	0	0	0	0	0	0	4	0
Barnsley	Total		66	1	3	0	0	0	1	0	70	1
Doncaster Rovers	2003–04	Third Division	14	1	—		—		—		14	1
Doncaster Rovers	2004–05	League One	31	1	0	0	2	0	2	0	35	1
Doncaster Rovers	2005–06	League One	32	2	3	2	2	0	2	0	39	4
Doncaster Rovers	Total		77	4	3	2	4	0	4	0	88	6
Scunthorpe United	2006–07	League One	24	1	1	0	2	1	2	0	29	2
Scunthorpe United	2007–08	Championship	0	0	0	0	0	0	—		0	0
Scunthorpe United	Total		24	1	1	0	2	1	2	0	29	2
Grimsby Town (loan)	2007–08	League Two	6	0	0	0	—		1	0	7	0
Port Vale	2007–08	League One	13	1	—		—		—		13	1
Wellington Phoenix	2008–09	A-League	3	0	—		—				3	0
Wellington Phoenix	2009–10	A-League	0	0	—		—				0	0
Wellington Phoenix	Total		3	0	0	0	0	0	0	0	3	0
Auckland City	2010–11	Premiership	9	5	—		—		6 (Note: Appearance(s) in the OFC Champions League.)	1	15	6
Auckland City	2011–12	Premiership	13	4	—		—		7 (Note: Six Appearances and two goals in the OFC Champions League, and one appearance in the FIFA Club World Cup.)	2	20	6
Auckland City	Total		22	9	0	0	0	0	13	3	35	12
Waitakere United	2012–13	Premiership	6	5	—		—		1 (Note: Appearances in Charity Cup.)	0	7	5
Hawke's Bay United	2013–14	Premiership	15	1	—		—		—		15	1
Waitakere United	2014–15	Premiership	11	2	—		—		—		11	2
Career total			243	24	7	2	6	1	22	3	278	30

=== International statistics ===
New Zealand national team
Year	Apps	Goals
2002	2	0
2003	2	0
2004	2	0
2005	1	0
2006	3	0
2007	4	3
2008	3	0
2009	8	0
2011	3	0
Total	28	3

== International goals ==
No.	Date	Venue	Opponent	Score	Result	Competition
1.	17 November 2007	Korman Stadium, Port Vila, Vanuatu	Vanuatu	2–1	2–1	2008 OFC Nations Cup
2.	21 November 2007	Wellington Regional Stadium, Wellington, New Zealand	Vanuatu	1–0	4–1	2008 OFC Nations Cup
3.	21 November 2007	Wellington Regional Stadium, Wellington, New Zealand	Vanuatu	4–1	4–1	2008 OFC Nations Cup

== Honours ==
New Zealand

- OFC Nations Cup: 2004

Doncaster Rovers

- Football League Third Division: 2003–04

Scunthorpe United

- Football League One: 2006–07

Auckland City

- OFC Champions League: 2011, 2012

Waitakere United

- New Zealand Football Championship: 2012–13
