= Antony Kay =

English footballer

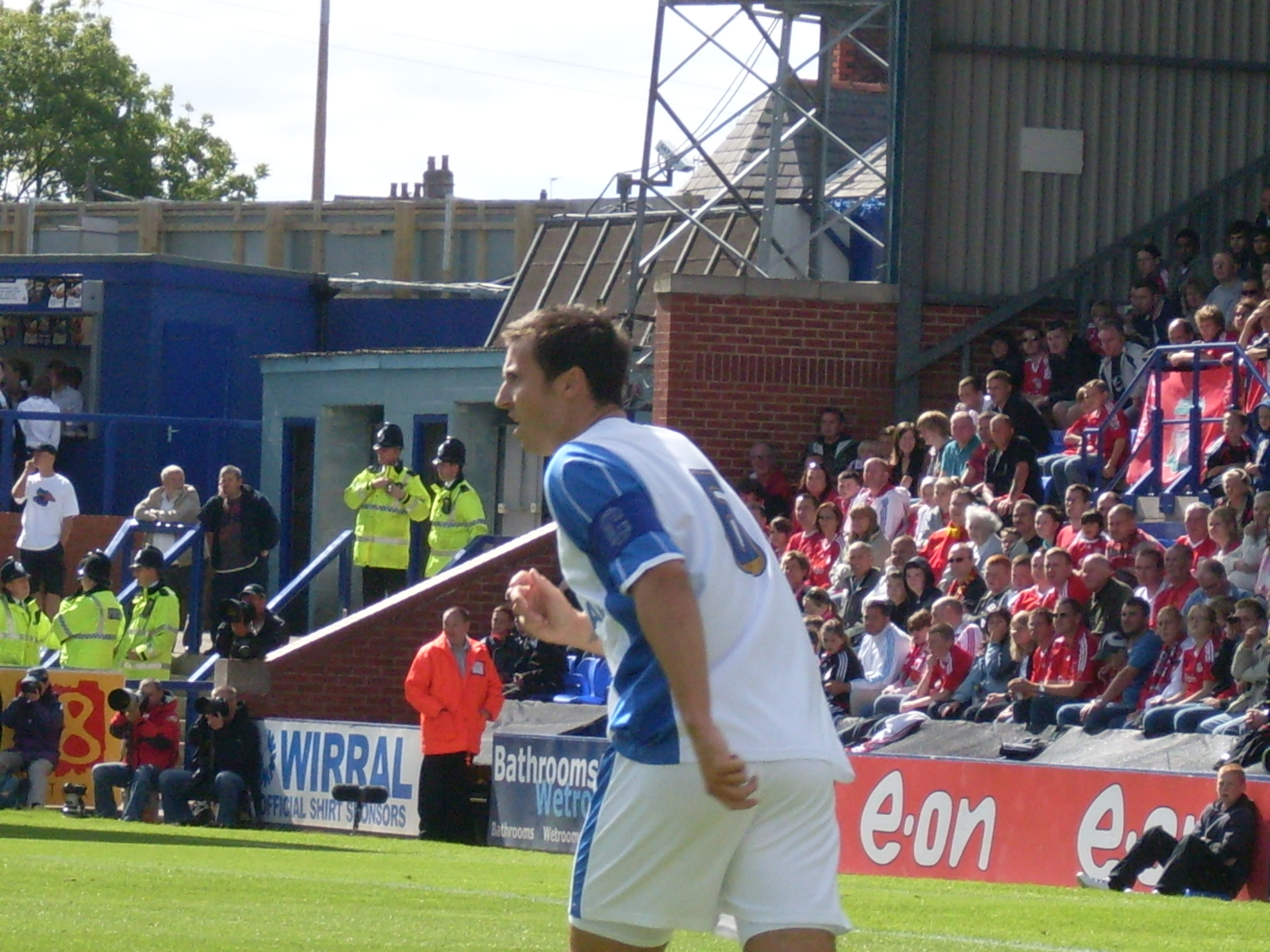
- Kay playing for Tranmere Rovers in 2009

Personal information
- Full name: Antony Roland Kay
- Date of birth: 21 October 1982 (age 44)
- Place of birth: Barnsley, England
- Height: 5 ft 11 in (1.80 m)
- Positions: Defender; midfielder

Team information
- Current team: Southport (first-team coach)

Youth career
- –1999: Barnsley

Senior career*
Years	Team	Apps	(Gls)
1999–2007	Barnsley	174	(11)
2007–2009	Tranmere Rovers	82	(17)
2009–2012	Huddersfield Town	95	(10)
2012–2016	Milton Keynes Dons	142	(6)
2016–2017	Bury	42	(0)
2017–2019	Port Vale	60	(5)
2020	Chorley	4	(0)
2020–2023	Bala Town	75	(8)
2023–2024	Runcorn Linnets	32	(4)
Total		706	(61)

International career
2001	England U18	1	(0)

Managerial career
- 2024–2025: Runcorn Linnets
- * Club domestic league appearances and goals

Antony Roland Kay (born 21 October 1982) is an English former footballer and manager who is a first-team coach at National League North club Southport. He scored 70 goals in 819 appearances during a 24-year playing career. His son, Arley, is also a professional footballer.

Kay could play as a defender or as a midfielder. He began his career with hometown club Barnsley and made his first-team debut in August 2000. Established as a first-team regular by the age of 20, he was voted as the club's Player of the Season in 2003–04, and helped Barnsley to win promotion out of League One via the play-offs in 2006 after scoring the winning penalty in the shoot-out victory over Swansea City. He signed with Tranmere Rovers in June 2007 and was voted the club's Player of the Season for 2008–09 before moving on to Huddersfield Town in May 2009. He was again promoted into the Championship after victory in the 2012 League One play-off final. However, he stayed in League One after joining Milton Keynes Dons in August 2012 and won his third promotion out of the division after helping the club to secure a runners-up spot in 2014–15.

He signed with Bury in June 2016 and played 47 matches as a club captain before moving on to Port Vale a year later. Released after two years in the Vale first-team, he went on to join non-League Chorley in January 2020. He joined Cymru Premier side Bala Town eight months later and went on to play in the 2023 Welsh Cup final before joining Runcorn Linnets in May 2023. He was appointed Runcorn's manager in May 2024 and was sacked in January 2025.

== Club career ==
=== Barnsley ===
Born in Barnsley, South Yorkshire, Kay began his career in the youth system at his hometown club Barnsley, signing a professional contract in October 1999. He made his first-team debut under Dave Bassett on 12 August 2000, in a 1–0 victory over Norwich City at Oakwell. He ended the 2000–01 season with seven First Division appearances to his name, and featured just once in the 2001–02 relegation campaign. Initially a midfielder, he was moved to centre back after Glyn Hodges took over from Nigel Spackman as manager in October 2002. He played 16 Second Division matches in the 2002–03 season.

He established himself as the club's utility player following the appointment of manager Guðjón Þórðarson in June 2003, and in addition to operating across the defence and midfield was also utilised as a target man striker in January, picking up a man-of-the-match award in that role against AFC Bournemouth. He scored four goals in 51 appearances across the 2003–04 campaign and was voted the club's Player of the Season. He signed a new one-year contract in June 2004.

Speaking in December 2004, manager Paul Hart said that "it's slightly too early to say whether he'll stay as a centre-half or return to midfield in his career". Still, he was able to say that Kay had "shown that when he is concentrating he is as good as anybody" in both defence and midfield. He scored six goals from 43 appearances in the 2004–05 campaign as Barnsley posted a 13th-place finish. He played 45 times in the 2005–06 season and scored the fourth and final Barnsley penalty in the play-off final penalty shoot-out victory over Swansea City at the Millennium Stadium, in which Andy Ritchie's "Tykes" gained promotion to the Championship. He played 33 matches in the 2006–07 season as Barnsley retained their second tier status with a 20th-place finish, but was rumoured to have had a bust-up with manager Simon Davey in February. His future with the club was put into doubt three months later after he allegedly broke club rules.

=== Tranmere Rovers ===
Kay signed a two-year contract with League One club Tranmere Rovers in June 2007. He scored seven goals from 43 matches in the 2007–08 season, playing mainly in his natural position of centre-back, which led manager Ronnie Moore to consider playing him as a goalscoring midfielder. Moore shifted him forward into midfield during the 2008–09 season, and Kay went on to score 12 goals in 53 appearances as Tranmere narrowly missed out on the play-offs after conceding a late equaliser at Scunthorpe United on the final day of the season. Kay was voted as the club's Player of the Season for 2008–09.

=== Huddersfield Town ===
Kay joined League One club Huddersfield Town on a two-year contract in May 2009; manager Lee Clark said that "he is a strong, physical player and we have identified that we need that presence in the side". He spent the 2009–10 season as a first-team regular in midfield, making 46 starts in league and cup competitions. Huddersfield qualified for the play-offs, and were knocked out by Millwall at the semi-final stage after losing 2–0 on aggregate. He was reduced to the role of substitute for parts of the 2010–11 campaign. He did though score both the extra time equaliser and the winning penalty in the subsequent shoot-out victory over Bournemouth in the play-off semi-final second leg at the Galpharm Stadium on 18 May. Eleven days later, Huddersfield went on to lose 3–0 to Peterborough United in the play-off final at Old Trafford.

Kay signed a new two-year contract in July 2011. He was limited to 28 league matches in the 2011–12 season, and was not in the matchday squad as Town secured promotion with victory over Sheffield United in the play-off final at Wembley Stadium. Manager Simon Grayson signed centre-backs Joel Lynch and Anthony Gerrard in the summer 2012 transfer window, and subsequently looked to move Kay on to a new club.

=== Milton Keynes Dons ===
Kay had his contract with Huddersfield cancelled by mutual consent and signed a two-year contract with League One club Milton Keynes Dons in August 2012. He made 42 appearances across the 2012–13 campaign as the Dons missed out on the play-offs after finishing two places and four points behind sixth-placed Swindon Town. In September 2013, he underwent surgery to correct a persistent hip problem and was out of action for 12 weeks. He recovered to play a total of 34 matches by the end of the 2013–14 campaign. During this time, he also sent off three times. He signed a new one-year contract in May 2014, having helped Karl Robinson's Dons to keep eight clean sheets in his 30 league matches on the way to a tenth-place finish.

Kay missed just one of the club's 46 league matches in the 2014–15 season as the Dons secured promotion out of League One with a second-place finish behind champions Bristol City. He signed a new one-year contract in June 2015. He played 34 Championship matches in the 2015–16 season as the Dons were relegated in 23rd-place. On 5 April, Kay made a late challenge on Wolverhampton Wanderers striker Michał Żyro, which left Zyro suffering with multiple knee ligament damage and over a year-long recovery. In May 2016, Kay was one of four players released from the club following relegation back into League One.

=== Bury ===
On 19 June 2016, Kay joined League One club Bury on a two-year contract. Six weeks later he was appointed as club captain by manager David Flitcroft. However, Bury endured a poor start to the season, leaving tensions high as Kay and teammate Tom Soares had to be separated from each other after exchanging heated words following a 5–1 defeat to AFC Wimbledon at the Kingsmeadow on 19 November. Bury's form did turn around over the new year though, and Kay praised manager Chris Brass for changing to a 5–3–2 formation and halting a club record 12-match losing streak and 17-match winless run.

=== Port Vale ===
On 28 June 2017, Kay secured his release from Bury and signed a two-year contract with League Two club Port Vale, who had been relegated after finishing two places and one point behind Bury the previous season. He was appointed as club captain by manager Michael Brown. He scored a headed goal on his debut for the "Valiants" in a 3–1 win at Crawley Town on 5 August. However, he was dropped by new manager Neil Aspin in October, who also gave the captaincy to Danny Pugh. Kay did though make a quick return to the first-team playing out-of-position in midfield. On 12 December, he scored the "goal of his life" with a stunning long-range lob in a 3–2 defeat at Yeovil Town in the FA Cup. He maintained his new position as a holding central midfield player until the end of February when he was both suspended for picking up ten yellow cards over the campaign and also ruled out of action for a month after undergoing a hernia operation. He marked his return from injury on 2 April by scoring what would go on to win him the club's goal of the season award, his long-range strike helping to secure a 2–2 draw at local rivals Crewe Alexandra. Two weeks later he was named on the EFL team of the week for scoring the only goal of a 1–0 win over Lincoln City. Kay featured 33 times during the 2018–19 season; however, manager John Askey confirmed that he would not be offering Kay a new contract on 16 May.

=== Non-League ===
On 16 January 2020, Kay signed a deal to join National League club Chorley until the end of the 2019–20 season. He made four appearances for the "Magpies" in the 2019–20 season, which was permanently suspended on 26 March due to the COVID-19 pandemic in England, with Chorley bottom of the table.

On 24 August 2020, Kay joined Cymru Premier side Bala Town. He scored five goals from 28 appearances in the 2020–21 season. He featured 26 times in the 2021–22 campaign and scored one goal in an 11–0 victory over Penybont at Maes Tegid on the final day of the season as Bala secured runners-up spot in the league. He featured thirty times in the 2022–23 campaign, including in the 6–0 defeat to The New Saints in the final of the Welsh Cup.

On 26 May 2023, at the age of 40, Kay signed with Northern Premier League Division One West club Runcorn Linnets; he was a former teammate of manager Billy Paynter. He made 41 appearances in the 2023–24 campaign, scoring four goals, as Runcorn reached the play-off semi-finals, where they were beaten by City of Liverpool.

== International career ==
Kay was capped once by the England national under-18 team, coming on as a substitute in a 0–0 draw with Switzerland on 30 May 2001.

== Style of play ==
Kay plays as a centre-back but can also operate as a holding midfielder; early in his career, he was something of a utility player, having also filled in at full back and as a striker on occasion. Bury Times journalist Mikael McKenzie stated that he is a solid all-round defender, is capable in the air and has good positional skills.

== Management career ==
Kay was appointed as Runcorn Linnets' new manager on 18 May 2024, following his retirement as a player. He was sacked on 30 January 2025 as the club's board felt there were a series of "disappointing results and performances". He applied for the vacant head coach role at Milton Keynes Dons in March 2025.

In July 2025, Kay joined National League North side Southport in the role of first-team coach, supporting manager and former Bury teammate Neil Danns.

== Personal life ==
Kay is married to Louise, with whom he has children, including his son, Arley Kay. His son, Arley Kay, also pursued a career in football, joining the Barnsley academy before making his professional debut for the club in August 2026, the same club for which his father made his professional debut. Arley and his sisters, Ella and Libby, travelled with their parents to Mauritius for Kay and Louise's wedding in 2013. Kay is a UEFA A licence coach and founded the Antony Kay Football Development Academy in 2024, where he serves as head coach.

== Career statistics ==
Appearances and goals by club, season and competition
Club	Season	League			National cup (Note: Includes FA Cup, Welsh Cup)		League cup (Note: Includes Football League Cup, Welsh League Cup)		Other		Total	
Club	Season	Division	Apps	Goals	Apps	Goals	Apps	Goals	Apps	Goals	Apps	Goals
Barnsley	2000–01	First Division	7	0	0	0	0	0	—		7	0
Barnsley	2001–02	First Division	1	0	0	0	0	0	—		1	0
Barnsley	2002–03	Second Division	16	0	0	0	0	0	1 (Note: Appearance(s) in Football League Trophy)	0	17	0
Barnsley	2003–04	Second Division	43	3	5	1	1	0	2	0	51	4
Barnsley	2004–05	League One	39	6	1	0	2	0	1	0	43	6
Barnsley	2005–06	League One	36	1	3	0	2	0	4 (Note: One appearance in Football League Trophy, three in League One play-offs)	0	45	1
Barnsley	2006–07	Championship	32	1	0	0	1	0	—		33	1
Barnsley	Total		174	11	9	1	6	0	8	0	197	12
Tranmere Rovers	2007–08	League One	38	6	4	1	0	0	1	0	43	7
Tranmere Rovers	2008–09	League One	44	11	4	1	1	0	4	0	53	12
Tranmere Rovers	Total		82	17	8	2	1	0	5	0	96	19
Huddersfield Town	2009–10	League One	40	6	3	0	2	0	3 (Note: One appearance in Football League Trophy, two in League One play-offs)	0	48	6
Huddersfield Town	2010–11	League One	27	3	4	1	1	0	8 (Note: Five appearances in Football League Trophy, three appearances and one goal in League One play-offs)	1	40	5
Huddersfield Town	2011–12	League One	28	1	1	0	0	0	2	0	31	1
Huddersfield Town	Total		95	10	8	1	3	0	13	1	119	12
Milton Keynes Dons	2012–13	League One	33	1	6	0	2	0	1	0	42	1
Milton Keynes Dons	2013–14	League One	30	2	2	0	1	0	1	0	34	2
Milton Keynes Dons	2014–15	League One	45	1	1	0	3	0	0	0	49	1
Milton Keynes Dons	2015–16	Championship	34	2	1	0	1	0	—		36	2
Milton Keynes Dons	Total		142	6	10	0	7	0	2	0	161	6
Bury	2016–17	League One	42	0	2	0	1	0	2 (Note: Appearance(s) in EFL Trophy)	1	47	1
Port Vale	2017–18	League Two	33	3	3	1	1	0	0	0	37	4
Port Vale	2018–19	League Two	27	2	0	0	1	0	5	0	33	2
Port Vale	Total		60	5	3	1	2	0	5	0	70	6
Chorley	2019–20	National League	4	0	0	0	—		0	0	4	0
Bala Town	2020–21	Cymru Premier	28	5	0	0	0	0	0	0	28	5
Bala Town	2021–22	Cymru Premier	23	1	2	0	1	0	0	0	26	1
Bala Town	2022–23	Cymru Premier	24	2	4	0	2	2	0	0	30	4
Bala Town	Total		75	8	6	0	3	2	0	0	84	10
Runcorn Linnets	2023–24	Northern Premier League; Division One West	32	4	4	0	—		5	0	41	4
Career total			706	61	50	5	23	2	40	2	819	70

== Honours ==
Barnsley

- Football League One play-offs: 2006

Milton Keynes Dons

- Football League One second-place promotion: 2014–15

Bala Town

- Welsh Cup runner-up: 2023

Individual

- Barnsley Player of the Season: 2003–04
- Tranmere Rovers Player of the Season: 2008–09
