= 2005–06 Swindon Town F.C. season =

Swindon Town
2005–06 season
- Chairman: Willie Carson
- Manager: Andy King; Iffy Onuora
- Ground: County Ground, Swindon
- League One: 23rd (Relegated)
- FA Cup: 1st Round
- League Cup: 1st Round
- FL Trophy: 2nd Round (South)
- Top goalscorer: League: Rory Fallon (12); All: Rory Fallon (14)
- Highest home attendance: 8,985 (vs. Swansea City)
- Lowest home attendance: 1,771 (vs. Stevenage Borough)
Home colours	Away colours

The 2005–06 season was Swindon Town's sixth season in the League One since their relegation from the second tier of English football in 2000. Alongside the league campaign, Swindon Town also competed in the FA Cup, League Cup and the Football League Trophy.

== League One ==
Pos	Team	Pld	W	D	L	GF	GA	GD	Pts	Qualification or relegation
20	Rotherham United	46	12	16	18	52	62	−10	52	
21	Hartlepool United (R)	46	11	17	18	44	59	−15	50	Relegation to League Two
22	Milton Keynes Dons (R)	46	12	14	20	45	66	−21	50	Relegation to League Two
23	Swindon Town (R)	46	11	15	20	46	65	−19	48	Relegation to League Two
24	Walsall (R)	46	11	14	21	47	70	−23	47	Relegation to League Two

Rules for classification: 1) Points; 2) Goal difference; 3) Goals scored
(R) Relegated

== Results and matchday squads ==
=== League One line-ups ===
Date	Opposition	V	Score	1	2	3	4	5	6	7	8	9	10	11	12	13	14	15	16
06/08/05	Barnsley	A	0–2	Evans	J.Smith	Collins	O'Hanlon	Ifil	Pook_{1}	Shakes	Whalley	Thorpe	Cureton	Jenkins_{2}	Roberts_{1}	Wells_{2}	Nicolau	Nicholas	Bulman
09/08/05	Oldham Athletic	H	2–3	Evans	J.Smith	Collins	O'Hanlon_{3}	Ifil	Pook_{2}	Roberts	Whalley	Thorpe	Cureton	Nicholas_{1}	Shakes_{1}	Nicolau_{2}	Reeves_{3}	Wells	Bulman
13/08/05	Nottingham Forest	H	2–1	Evans	J.Smith	Collins	O'Hanlon	Ifil	Pook	Summerbee_{1}	Whalley	Fallon	Cureton_{2}	Nicolau	Shakes_{1}	Roberts_{2}	Reeves	Wells	Bulman
20/08/05	Blackpool	A	0–0	Evans	J.Smith	Collins	O'Hanlon	Ifil	Pook	Heath_{3}	Whalley_{1}	Fallon	Cureton_{2}	Nicolau	Jenkins_{1}	Roberts_{2}	Shakes_{3}	Thorpe	Heaton
27/08/05	Yeovil Town	H	4–2	Heaton	J.Smith	Collins	O'Hanlon_{1}	Ifil	Pook	Heath_{3}	Whalley	Fallon	Cureton_{2}	Shakes	Gurney_{1}	Roberts_{2}	Miglioranzi_{3}	Thorpe	Bulman
29/08/05	Tranmere Rovers	A	0–1	Heaton	J.Smith	Collins	Gurney	Ifil	Pook	Heath_{1}	Miglioranzi	Fallon	Whalley_{3}	Shakes_{2}	Roberts_{1}	Cureton_{2}	Wells_{3}	Comyn-Platt	Bulman
03/09/05	Walsall	A	0–1	Heaton	J.Smith	Collins	Gurney	Ifil	Pook	Heath_{1}	Miglioranzi_{3}	Fallon	Whalley	Shakes_{2}	Roberts_{1}	Cureton_{2}	Jenkins_{3}	Nicolau	Bulman
10/09/05	Southend United	H	1–2	Heaton	J.Smith	Collins	Gurney	Ifil	Pook	Whalley_{2}	Miglioranzi	Fallon	Cureton_{1}	Nicolau_{3}	Thorpe_{1}	Shakes_{2}	Roberts_{3}	Jenkins	Bulman
17/09/05	Bournemouth	A	1–2	Heaton	J.Smith	Collins	Gurney	Ifil	Pook	Jenkins_{1}	Miglioranzi	Fallon	Thorpe_{2}	Whalley_{3}	McDermott_{1}	Roberts_{2}	Heath_{3}	Shakes	Bulman
24/09/05	Bradford City	H	2–3	Heaton	J.Smith	Collins	O'Hanlon	Ifil	Pook	Nicholas	Miglioranzi_{1}	Fallon	Thorpe_{2}	Whalley_{3}	McDermott_{1}	Roberts_{2}	Heath_{3}	Cureton	Bulman
27/09/05	Doncaster Rovers	A	0–1	Heaton	J.Smith	Collins_{2}	O'Hanlon	Ifil	Pook	Heath_{1}	McDermott	Fallon	Thorpe	Shakes	Roberts_{1}	Cureton_{2}	Nicholas	Wells	Bulman
01/10/05	Milton Keynes Dons	A	1–3	Heaton	J.Smith	Collins	O'Hanlon	Nicholas	Pook	Heath	McDermott	Fallon	Thorpe_{2}	Shakes_{1}	Nicolau_{1}	Cureton_{2}	Comyn-Platt	Wells	Bulman
08/10/05	Port Vale	H	1–2	Heaton	J.Smith	Jenkins	O'Hanlon	Ifil	Pook	Heath_{1}	McDermott	Fallon	Whalley_{2}	Bouazza_{3}	Shakes_{1}	Wells_{2}	Nicholas_{3}	Collins	Bulman
15/10/05	Brentford	A	0–0	Heaton	J.Smith_{2}	Jenkins_{1}	O'Hanlon	Ifil	Pook	Heath_{3}	Gurney	Fallon	Whalley	Bouazza	Nicholas_{1}	McDermott_{2}	Roberts_{3}	Cureton	Bulman
22/10/05	Scunthorpe United	H	1–1	Heaton	Gurney	Jenkins	O'Hanlon	Nicholas	Pook	Whalley_{2}	McDermott_{1}	Fallon	Roberts	Bouazza	Comyn-Platt_{1}	Shakes_{2}	Thorpe	Heath	Bulman
29/10/05	Huddersfield Town	A	1–1	Heaton	Gurney_{1}	Jenkins	O'Hanlon	Ifil	Pook_{2}	Shakes_{3}	Miglioranzi	Bouazza	Stroud	Nicholas	McDermott_{1}	Heath_{2}	Comyn-Platt_{3}	Thorpe	Bulman
11/11/05	Bristol City	H	2–1	Heaton	J.Smith_{2}	Nicholas	O'Hanlon	Ifil	Pook_{1}	Gurney	Miglioranzi	Fallon	McDermott_{3}	Bouazza	Roberts_{1}	Jenkins_{2}	Comyn-Platt_{3}	Shakes	Bulman
19/11/05	Port Vale	A	1–1	Evans	Jenkins	Nicholas	O'Hanlon	Ifil	Comyn-Platt	Whalley	Miglioranzi	Fallon	Roberts_{1}	Bouazaa	Shakes_{1}	J.Smith	Pook	McDermott	Bulman
26/11/05	Barnsley	H	0–3	Heaton	Jenkins	Nicholas	O'Hanlon	Ifil	Comyn-Platt	Gurney_{1}	Miglioranzi_{1}	Fallon	Roberts	Bouazza	Mikolanda_{1}	Brown_{2}	J.Smith	Whalley	Evans
03/12/05	Rotherham United	A	1–0	Evans	J.Smith_{1}	Nicholas	Collins	Comyn-Platt	Pook	Brown	Miglioranzi	Fallon_{2}	McDermott	Bouazza_{3}	Whalley_{1}	Mikolanda_{2}	Whalley_{3}	Henry	Bulman
10/12/05	Oldham Athletic	A	2–2	Evans	J.Smith	Nicholas	O'Hanlon	Comyn-Platt_{1}	Pook	Shakes	Miglioranzi	Fallon_{3}	McDermott_{2}	Bouazza	Ifil_{1}	Brown_{2}	Mikolanda_{3}	Whalley	Heaton
17/12/05	Blackpool	H	0–0	Evans	J.Smith	Nicholas	O'Hanlon	Ifil	Pook	McDermott_{2}	Miglioranzi	Fallon	Mikolanda_{1}	Bouazza_{3}	Shakes_{1}	Brown_{2}	Holgate_{3}	Jenkins	Heaton
26/12/05	Colchester United	H	1–0	Evans	J.Smith	Nicholas	O'Hanlon	Ifil	Brown	McDermott_{1}	Miglioranzi	Fallon	Holgate_{2}	Shakes	Pook_{1}	Bouazza_{2}	Jenkins	Mikolanda	Evans
28/12/05	Chesterfield	A	1–1	Evans	J.Smith	Nicholas	O'Hanlon	Ifil	Pook_{1}	Shakes	Gurney	Fallon	Bouazza_{2}	Brown	Pook_{1}	Jenkins_{2}	McDermott	Mikolanda	Bulman
31/12/05	Swansea City	H	0–0	Evans	J.Smith_{1}	Nicholas	O'Hanlon	Ifil	Gurney	Shakes	Miglioranzi	Fallon	Holgate	Brown_{3}	Jenkins_{1}	Bouazza_{2}	Comyn-Platt_{3}	Mikolanda	Heaton
02/01/06	Hartlepool United	A	1–1	Evans	Jenkins	Nicholas	O'Hanlon	Ifil	Jenkins	Shakes	Miglioranzi_{3}	Fallon	Cureton_{2}	Brown_{1}	Stroud_{1}	Mikolanda_{2}	Pook_{3}	Holgate	Bulman
14/01/06	Gillingham	H	0–3	Evans	Jenkins	Nicholas_{2}	O'Hanlon_{1}	Ifil	Comyn-Platt	Shakes	Miglioranzi	Fallon	Cureton	Brown	_{1}	_{2}	Lapham	Pook	Bulman
21/01/06	Bournemouth	H	4–2	Evans	Jenkins	Nicholas	Gurney	Ifil	Comyn-Platt	Shakes	Miglioranzi_{1}	Fallon	Cureton_{3}	Brown_{2}	Jarrett_{1}	Peacock_{2}	P.Smith_{3}	J.Smith	Bulman
27/01/06	Southend United	A	0–2	Evans	Jenkins	Nicholas	O'Hanlon	Ifil	Gurnay	Shakes	Miglioranzi_{2}	Peacock	Jarrett_{3}	Brown_{1}	Cureton_{1}	P.Smith_{2}	Comyn-Platt_{3}	J.Smith	Bulman
31/01/06	Walsall	H	1–0	Evans	J.Smith	Nicholas	O'Hanlon	Ifil	Gurney_{2}	Shakes	Miglioranzi_{1}	Peacock_{3}	Cureton	Brown	Comyn-Platt_{1}	P.Smith_{2}	Benjamin_{3}	Holgate	Bulman
04/02/06	Doncaster Rovers	H	2–1	Evans	J.Smith	Nicholas	O'Hanlon	Ifil	Comyn-Platt_{1}	Shakes	P.Smith	Peacock_{2}	Cureton	Brown	Gurney_{1}	Holgate_{2}	Miglioranzi	Stroud	Bulman
11/02/06	Bradford City	A	1–1	Evans	J.Smith	Nicholas	O'Hanlon	Ifil	Gurney_{2}	Shakes	P.Smith	Peacock	Cureton_{1}	Brown	Roberts_{1}	Jarrett_{2}	Jenkins	Miglioranzi	Bulman
14/02/06	Gillingham	H	1–0	Evans	J.Smith	Nicholas	O'Hanlon	Ifil	Gurney	Shakes_{2}	P.Smith_{1}	Peacock	Cureton	Brown	Miglioranzi_{1}	Roberts_{2}	Jenkins	Jarrett	Bulman
18/02/06	Rotherham United	H	2–3	Evans	J.Smith	Nicholas	O'Hanlon	Ifil	Gurney_{1}	Shakes_{2}	Miglioranzi_{3}	Peacock	Cureton	Brown	Jarrett_{1}	Roberts_{2}	Pook_{3}	Jenkins	Bulman
25/02/06	Nottingham Forest	A	1–7	Evans	J.Smith	Nicholas	O'Hanlon	Ifil	Jarrett_{2}	Shakes_{1}	Miglioranzi_{3}	Peacock	Cureton	Brown	Benjamin_{1}	Gurney_{2}	Jenkins_{3}	Roberts	Bulman
07/03/06	Tranmere Rovers	H	1–2	Evans	J.Smith_{1}	Nicholas	O'Hanlon	Gurney	Pook	Benjamin	Miglioranzi_{2}	Peacock	Cureton	Brown	Shakes_{1}	Jarrett_{2}	Jenkins	Whalley	Bulman
11/03/06	Yeovil Town	A	0–0	Evans	J.Smith	Nicholas	O'Hanlon	Gurney	Pook_{2}	Jenkins_{1}	Whalley	Peacock	Cureton	Brown	Miglioranzi_{1}	Shakes_{2}	Benjamin	Roberts	Bulman
18/03/06	Colchester United	A	0–1	Evans	J.Smith	Nicholas_{2}	O'Hanlon	Gurney	Pook	Jenkins	Whalley_{3}	Peacock_{1}	Cureton	Brown	Benjamin_{1}	Comyn-Platt_{2}	Roberts_{3}	Miglioranzi	Shakes
25/03/06	Chesterfield	H	2–0	Evans	J.Smith	Comyn-Platt	O'Hanlin	Gurney	Pook_{1}	Jenkins	Whalley	Benjamin	Cureton	Brown	Diagouraga_{1}	McPhee_{2}	Ifil_{3}	Shakes	Jutkiewicz
08/04/06	Hartlepool United	H	1–1	Evans	J.Smith	Jenkins	O'Hanlon	Ifil_{3}	Comyn-Platt	Whalley_{2}	Diagouraga	Cureton	Benjamin_{1}	Brown	Peacock_{1}	McPhee_{2}	Shakes_{3}	Miglioranzi	Nicholas
11/04/06	Swansea City	A	1–2	Evans	J.Smith	Nicholas	O'Hanlon	Comyn-Platt	Whalley_{3}	Shakes	Diagouraga_{2}	Peacock_{1}	McPhee	Brown	Jutkiewicz_{1}	Miglioranzi_{2}	Cureton_{3}	Jenkins	Pook
15/04/06	Milton Keynes Dons	H	0–1	Evans	J.Smith	Nicholas	O'Hanlon	Gurney	Whalley_{2}	Shakes	Diagouraga	Cureton	McPhee	Brown_{1}	Comyn-Platt_{13}	Miglioranzi_{2}	Peacock_{3}	Jenkins	Jutkiewicz
17/04/06	Scunthorpe United	A	2–1	Evans	J.Smith	Nicholas	O'Hanlon	Gurney	P.Smith_{1}	Shakes	Diagouraga	Jutkiewicz_{3}	Benjamin	McPhee_{2}	Comyn-Platt_{1}	Jenkins_{2}	Peacock_{3}	Cureton	Pook
22/04/06	Brentford	H	1–3	Evans	J.Smith	Nicholas	O'Hanlon	Gurney	P.Smith_{1}	Shakes	Whalley_{2}	Cureton	Benjamin_{3}	McPhee	Diagouraga_{1}	Brown_{2}	Jutkiewicz_{3}	Jenkins	Peacock
29/04/06	Bristol City	A	1–1	Evans	J.Smith	Jenkins_{1}	O'Hanlon	Ifil	Comyn-Platt	Whalley_{3}	Diagouraga_{2}	Jutkiewicz	McPhee	Brown	Gurney_{1}	Pook_{2}	Cureton_{3}	Benjamin	Shakes
06/05/06	Huddersfield Town	H	0–0	Evans	J.Smith	Comyn-Platt_{2}	O'Hanlon_{1}	Ifil	Pook	Shakes	Whalley_{3}	Jutkiewicz	McPhee	Brown	Wells_{1}	Cureton_{2}	Diagouraga_{3}	Benjamin	Stroud

_{1} 1st Substitution, _{2} 2nd Substitution, _{3} 3rd Substitution.

=== FA Cup line-ups ===
Date	Opposition	V	Score	1	2	3	4	5	6	7	8	9	10	11	12	13	14	15	16
05/11/05	Boston United	H	2–2	Heaton	Jenkins	Nicholas	O'Hanlon	Ifil	Gurney	Shakes	Miglioranzi_{3}	Thorpe_{2}	Heath	Stroud_{1}	Pook_{1}	Holgate_{2}	Comyn-Platt_{3}	Whalley	Bulman
16/11/05	Boston United	A	1–4	Heaton	Jenkins	Nicholas	O'Hanlon	Ifil	Gurney_{2}	McDermott_{1}	Pook_{3}	Fallon	Roberts	J.Smith	Shakes_{2}	Comyn-Platt_{3}	Whalley	Holgate	Bulman_{1}

_{1} 1st Substitution, _{2} 2nd Substitution, _{3} 3rd Substitution.

=== League Cup line-ups ===
Date	Opposition	V	Score	1	2	3	4	5	6	7	8	9	10	11	12	13	14	15	16
23/08/05	Wycombe Wanderers	H	1–3	Heaton	J.Smith	Comyn-Platt	Reeves	Ifil	Pook	Heath	Whalley_{3}	Thorpe_{1}	Roberts_{2}	Shakes	Fallon_{1}	Cureton_{2}	Nicolau_{3}	Lapham	Evans

_{1} 1st Substitution, _{2} 2nd Substitution, _{3} 3rd Substitution.

=== Football League Trophy line-ups ===
Date	Opposition	V	Score	1	2	3	4	5	6	7	8	9	10	11	12	13	14	15	16
18/10/05	Stevenage Borough	H	2–0	Heaton	Gurney	Nicholas	O'Hanlon	Jenkins_{2}	Pook	McDermott	Whalley_{1}	Fallon_{3}	Roberts	Bouazza	Comyn-Platt_{1}	Cureton_{2}	Thorpe_{3}	Heath	Bulman
22/11/05	Peterborough United	A	1–2	Heaton	Jenkins	Nicholas	O'Hanlon	Ifil	Comyn-Platt	Heath_{2}	Whalley_{1}	Fallon	Roberts	Bouazza	McDermott_{1}	Holgate_{2}	J.Smith	Shakes	Bulman

_{1} 1st Substitution, _{2} 2nd Substitution, _{3} 3rd Substitution.
