= 2009–10 Wycombe Wanderers F.C. season =

Wycombe Wanderers
2009–10 season
- Chairman: Ivor Beeks
- Manager: Peter Taylor; Gary Waddock
- League One: 22nd (Relegation)
- FA Cup: 1st Round
- League Cup: 1st Round
- Top goalscorer: Matt Harrold (8)

The 2009–10 Football League One was Wycombe Wanderers F.C.'s sixteenth season of League football. This article shows statistics of the club's players in the season, and also lists all matches that the club has played during the season.

== Match results ==
=== Legend ===
Win	Draw	Loss

=== Football League One ===
Game	Date	Opponent	Venue	Result	Attendance	Goalscorers	Ref.
1	8 August 2009	Charlton Athletic	The Valley	2–3	16,552	Zebroski 43', 73'	
2	15 August 2009	Leeds United	Adams Park	0–1	8,400		
3	18 August 2009	Southend United	Adams Park	1–1	4,607	Harrold 40'	
4	22 August 2009	Norwich City	Carrow Road	2–5	23,428	Pittman 39', Harrold 46'	
5	29 August 2009	Bristol Rovers	Adams Park	2–1	5,214	Phillips 36', Pittman 80'	
6	5 September 2009	Brighton & Hove Albion	Withdean Stadium	0–1	5,895		
7	12 September 2009	Hartlepool United	Victoria Park	1–1	3,326	Beavon 50'	
8	19 September 2009	Milton Keynes Dons	Adams Park	0–1	6,127		
9	26 September 2009	Swindon Town	County Ground	1–1	6,929	Chambers 89'	
10	29 September 2009	Tranmere Rovers	Adams Park	0–1	3,899		
11	3 October 2009	Leyton Orient	Adams Park	0–1	4,798		
12	10 October 2009	Gillingham	Priestfield Stadium	2–3	5,316	Woodman 27', Bentley 62' (o.g.)	
13	17 October 2009	Colchester United	Adams Park	1–1	5,394	Pittman 87'	
14	24 October 2009	Exeter City	St James Park	1–1	5,227	Harrold 42' (Pen)	
15	31 October 2009	Walsall	Adams Park	2–3	5,046	Davies 14', 37'	
16	14 November 2009	Huddersfield Town	Galpharm Stadium	0–6	14,869		
17	21 November 2009	Millwall	The Den	2–0	9,728	Westwood 56', Betsy 72'	
18	24 November 2009	Brentford	Adams Park	1–0	5,181	Harrold 48' (Pen)	
19	1 December 2009	Southampton	St Mary's Stadium	0–1	16,402		
20	5 December 2009	Stockport County	Adams Park	2–1	4,343	Westwood 74', Davies 83'	
21	12 December 2009	Carlisle United	Brunton Park	0–1	4,528		
22	19 December 2009	Oldham Athletic	Adams Park	2–2	4,160	Akinde 9', Harrold 88' (Pen)	
23	26 December 2009	Yeovil Town	Huish Park	0–4	5,055		
24	28 December 2009	Brighton & Hove Albion	Adams Park	2–5	6,126	Pittman 27', Mousinho 40'	
25	2 January 2010	Norwich City	Adams Park	0–1	7,171		
26	9 January 2010	Leeds United	Elland Road	1–1	24,383	Pittman 63'	
27	16 January 2010	Charlton Athletic	Adams Park	1–2	6,123	Pittman 64'	
28	23 January 2010	Southend United	Roots Hall	1–1	6,675	Payne 64'	
29	30 January 2010	Bristol Rovers	Memorial Stadium	3–2	6,688	Harrold 15' (Pen), Revell 48' (Pen), Beavon 80'	
30	6 February 2010	Yeovil Town	Adams Park	1–4	4,793	Harrold 50'	
31	13 February 2010	Brentford	Griffin Park	1–1	5,740	Betsy 27'	
32	20 February 2010	Millwall	Adams Park	1–0	5,774	Kelly 45+2'	
33	23 February 2010	Southampton	Adams Park	0–0	6,232		
34	27 February 2010	Stockport County	Edgeley Park	3–4	3,740	Phillips 67', 70', Fôn Williams 85' (o.g.)	
35	6 March 2010	Carlisle United	Adams Park	0–0	4,876		
36	13 March 2010	Oldham Athletic	Boundary Park	2–2	3,846	Harrold 42' (Pen), Betsy 49'	
37	20 March 2010	Exeter City	Adams Park	2–2	5,054	Ainsworth 55', Beavon 61'	
38	27 March 2010	Colchester United	Community Stadium	1–1	5,593	Ainsworth 90+3'	
39	3 April 2010	Huddersfield Town	Adams Park	1–2	5,288	Keates 73'	
40	5 April 2010	Walsall	The Banks' Stadium	1–2	3,618	Hinshelwood 78'	
41	10 April 2010	Hartlepool United	Adams Park	2–0	4,342	Phillips 66', Pittman 88'	
42	13 April 2010	Tranmere Rovers	Prenton Park	3–0	4,956	Revell 15', 69', Bloomfield 86'	
43	17 April 2010	Milton Keynes Dons	stadium:mk	3–2	10,561	Revell 29', 64', Betsy 90+5'	
44	24 April 2010	Swindon	Adams Park	2–2	7,459	Bloomfield 45+3', Revell 75'	
45	1 May 2010	Leyton Orient	Brisbane Road	0–2	5,918		
46	8 May 2010	Gillingham	Adams Park	3–0	7,110	Phillips 45+2', Bennett 64', Betsy 72'	

=== FA Cup ===
Round	Date	Opponent	Venue	Result	Attendance	Goalscorers	Ref.
R1	7 November 2009	Brighton & Hove Albion	Adams Park	4–4	2,749	Harrold 18', 70', (1 Pen), Davies 38', Pittman 61'	
R1 Replay	18 November 2009	Brighton & Hove Albion	Withdean Stadium	0–2	3,383		

=== League Cup ===
Round	Date	Opponent	Venue	Result	Attendance	Goalscorers	Ref.
1	11 August 2009	Peterborough United	Adams Park	0–4	2,078		

=== Football League Trophy ===
Round	Date	Opponent	Venue	Result	Attendance	Goalscorers	Ref.
1	1 September 2009	Northampton Town	Adams Park	2–2 (0–3 Pens)	1,035	Pittman 62', 90+2' (1 Pen)	

== Squad statistics ==
Appearances for competitive matches only

No.	Pos.	Name	League		FA Cup		League Cup		Total		Discipline	
No.	Pos.	Name	Apps	Goals	Apps	Goals	Apps	Goals	Apps	Goals	Yellow card	Red card
1	GK	(Scotland) Scott Shearer	29	0	2	0	0	0	31	0	3	0
2	DF	(England) Lewis Hunt	26 (1)	0	1	0	0	0	27 (1)	0	3	0
3	DF	(England) Craig Woodman	44	1	2	0	1	0	47	1	4	1
4	DF	(England) Leon Johnson	5	0	1	0	1	0	6	0	2	0
5	DF	(England) Michael Duberry	18	0	1	0	0	0	19	0	0	0
5	DF	(Republic of Ireland) Alan Bennett	6	1	0	0	0	0	6	1	1	0
6	DF	(England) Luke Oliver	19 (4)	0	1	0	1	0	21 (4)	0	4	0
7	DF	(England) Ian Westlake	7 (2)	0	0	0	0	0	7 (2)	0	1	0
8	MF	(Northern Ireland) Tommy Doherty	1 (1)	0	2	0	0	0	3 (1)	0	2	0
8	MF	(England) Dean Keates	13	1	0	0	0	0	13	1	1	0
9	FW	(England) Matt Harrold	29 (6)	7	2	2	0	0	31 (6)	9	3	0
10	MF	(England) Matt Bloomfield	8 (6)	2	0 (1)	0	1	0	9 (7)	2	1	0
11	FW	(England) Chris Zebroski	11 (3)	2	0 (2)	0	0 (1)	0	11 (6)	2	2	0
11	FW	(England) Alex Revell	11 (4)	6	0	0	0	0	11 (4)	6	2	0
12	GK	(Australia) Jamie Young	1	0	0	0	1	0	0	2	0	0
12	GK	(England) Steve Arnold	0	0	0	0	0	0	0	0	0	0
15	MF	(England) Stuart Green	10 (3)	0	1	0	1	0	12 (3)	0	0	0
16	FW	(United States) Jon-Paul Pittman	22 (18)	7	1 (1)	1	1	0	24 (19)	8	1	0
17	MF	(England) Lewis Montrose	11 (3)	0	0	0	0	0	10 (3)	0	0	0
18	MF	(England) Matt Phillips	19 (17)	5	2	0	0 (1)	0	21 (18)	5	1	0
19	MF	(England) Lewwis Spence	0	0	0	0	0	0	0	0	0	0
20	MF	(England) John Mousinho	37 (2)	1	1	0	1	0	39 (2)	1	3	0
21	MF	(England) Joe Cobb	0	0	0	0	0	0	0	0	0	0
22	MF	(England) TJ Moncur	4	0	0	0	0	0	4	0	0	0
22	MF	(Republic of Ireland) Scott Davies	14 (1)	3	2	1	0	0	16 (1)	4	4	0
22	GK	(England) Tom Heaton	16	0	0	0	0	0	16	0	0	0
23	DF	(England) Chris Westwood	28	2	1	0	1	0	30	2	0	0
24	FW	(England) Stuart Beavon	14 (11)	3	0 (1)	0	1	0	15 (12)	3	1	0
25	MF	(England) Dan Fitchett	0	0	0	0	0	0	0	0	0	0
27	MF	(England) Ashley Chambers	0 (3)	1	0	0	0	0	0 (3)	1	0	0
27	MF	(England) Josh Payne	3	1	0	0	0	0	3	1	1	0
28	MF	(England) Danny Spiller	0	0	0	0	1	0	1	0	0	0
28	MF	(England) Marlon Pack	7 (1)	0	0	0	0	0	7 (1)	0	1	0
28	FW	(England) John Akinde	4 (2)	1	0	0	0	0	4 (2)	1	0	1
28	MF	(England) Kevin McLeod	8 (3)	0	0	0	0	0	8 (3)	0	2	0
29	MF	(England) Kevin Betsy	35 (4)	5	1	0	0	0	36 (4)	5	2	0
30	DF	(England) Adam Smith	3	0	0	0	0	0	3	0	0	0
30	MF	(England) Kadeem Harris	0 (2)	0	0	0	0	0	0 (2)	0	0	0
31	MF	(England) Gareth Ainsworth	11 (2)	2	0	0	0	0	11 (2)	2	0	1
32	DF	(England) Adam Hinshelwood	13	1	0	0	0	0	13	1	3	0
34	DF	(Republic of Ireland) Julian Kelly	9	1	0	0	0	0	9	1	1	0

== See also ==
- 2009–10 in English football
- Wycombe Wanderers F.C.
