= Kevin Betsy =

Seychellois footballer and manager (born 1978)

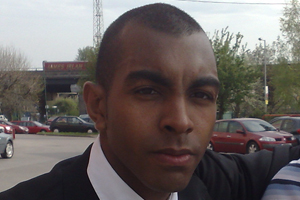
- Betsy in 2008

Personal information
- Full name: Kevin Eddie Lewis Betsy
- Date of birth: 20 March 1978 (age 48)
- Place of birth: Woking, England
- Height: 6 ft 1 in (1.85 m)
- Position: Midfielder

Team information
- Current team: Queens Park Rangers (coach)

Senior career*
Years	Team	Apps	(Gls)
1997–1998	Woking	50	(8)
1998–2002	Fulham	15	(1)
1999	→ AFC Bournemouth (loan)	5	(0)
1999	→ Hull City (loan)	2	(0)
2002	→ Barnsley (loan)	5	(0)
2002–2004	Barnsley	89	(16)
2004	→ Hartlepool United (loan)	6	(1)
2004–2005	Oldham Athletic	36	(5)
2005–2007	Wycombe Wanderers	71	(13)
2007–2008	Bristol City	18	(1)
2007	→ Yeovil Town (loan)	5	(1)
2008	→ Walsall (loan)	16	(2)
2008–2010	Southend United	43	(3)
2009–2010	→ Wycombe Wanderers (loan)	39	(5)
2010–2011	Wycombe Wanderers	48	(6)
2012–2015	Woking	138	(26)
Total		586	(88)

International career
1998	England C	1	(0)
2011	Seychelles	7	(1)

Managerial career
- 2016–2019: England U16
- 2019–2020: England U17
- 2020–2021: England U18
- 2022: Crawley Town
Medal record
Men's football
Representing Seychelles
Indian Ocean Island Games
Gold medal – first place	2011 Seychelles
- * Club domestic league appearances and goals

Kevin Eddie Lewis Betsy (born 20 March 1978) is a football coach and a former professional footballer having played at the Championship level, briefly in the Premier League, and for the Seychelles national team. Betsy is currently the assistant coach at championship club Queens Park Rangers.

Betsy started his career with Woking but went on to make a name for himself with Fulham as part of the squad that earned promotion to the Premier League. He made one appearance in the top tier of English football, becoming the first Seychellois player to play in the Premier League. He then also spent time on loan with AFC Bournemouth, Hull City, and Barnsley before joining the latter on a permanent deal in 2002. Betsy made 94 league appearances, scoring 15 goals in a two-year period with the Barnsley Tykes before moving to Hartlepool United, Oldham Athletic and then Wycombe Wanderers. In 2007, Betsy signed for Bristol City and whilst there spent loan spells with Yeovil Town and Walsall. A year after signing for City he moved on again to Southend United before returning to Wycombe following a loan spell. In 2012, he re-signed for Woking.

Born in England, Betsy qualified to represent the Seychelles through his grandparents. He played for the Seychelles national team, earning his first cap in 2011.

Following a move into coaching, Betsy worked as a coach for the England U16 team, later taking up similar roles with the U17 and U18 teams. He later spent a season as U23 coach of Arsenal before managing Crawley Town briefly in 2022. In June 2023, Betsy was announced as assistant head coach at Cambridge United, spending a year there before joining Queens Park Rangers as first team development coach in July 2024.

== Playing career ==
=== Early career ===
Betsy started his career at Woking, representing England at semi professional level and being named Conference Player of the Year in 1998. In September 1998, Betsy was signed by Fulham for a fee of £80,000, which would potentially rise to £125,000, with manager Kevin Keegan describing him as one of the best young players he had seen at his age. He made his debut at Anfield against Liverpool in the League Cup and spent three years at Fulham. Betsy's only goal for Fulham came in their victorious 1998–99 Division Two campaign against Millwall. He made five league appearances during Fulham's 2000/01 season after which they were promoted to the Premier League. He made one appearance in the Premiership for Fulham under Jean Tigana in a game against Manchester United at Old Trafford. He had loan spells at AFC Bournemouth and Hull City.

=== Barnsley and Oldham Athletic ===
On 1 March 2002, Betsy joined Barnsley on a one-month loan. After five appearances, Betsy was signed by Barnsley for a fee of £200,000 on 28 March 2002. He made over 90 appearances for the club and scored 17 goals and was the club's top goal scorer in 2002–03 season with 11 goals from midfield. Betsy had a short loan spell with Hartlepool United in August 2004, making six appearances and scoring once. On 8 September 2004, he signed for Oldham Athletic on a contract until the end of the season, after his Barnsley contract was terminated by mutual consent. At Oldham, he scored five goals and was a key member of the team which defeated Manchester City in the FA Cup.

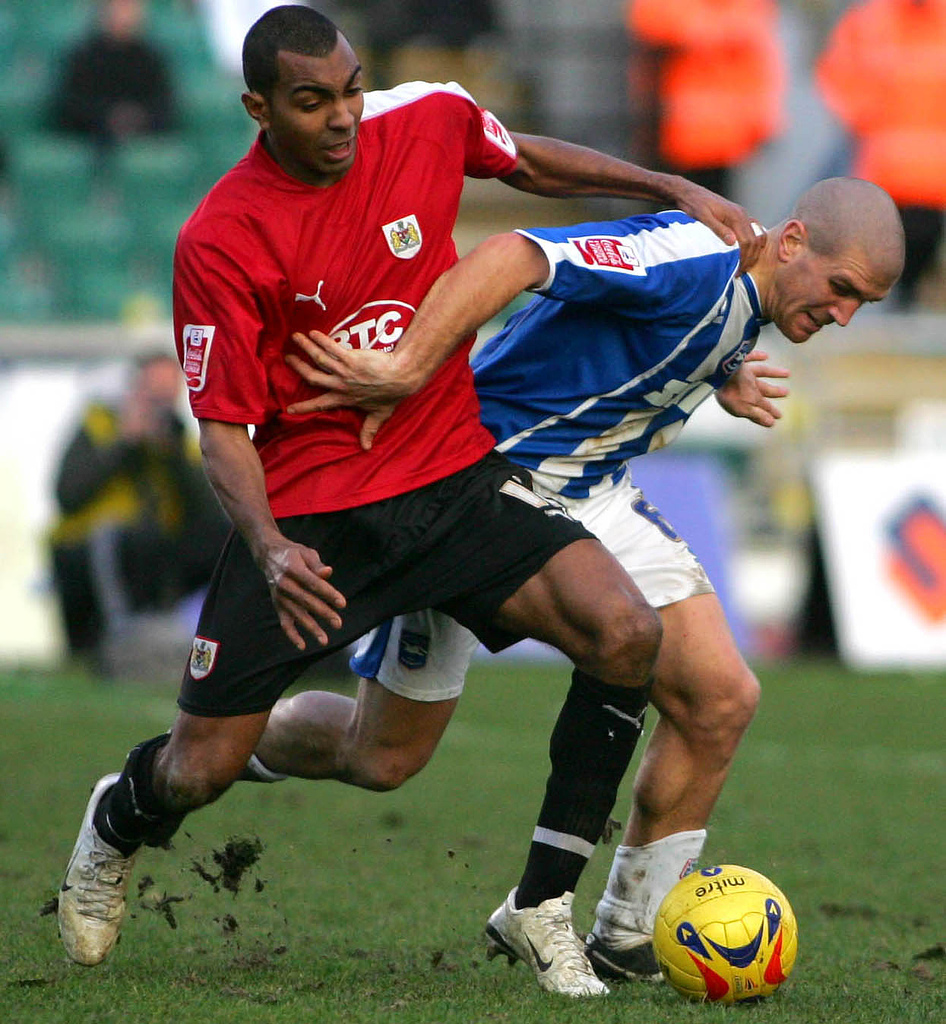
Betsy in action for Bristol City.

=== Wycombe Wanderers ===
After turning down Oldham's offer of a new contract, Betsy moved to Wycombe Wanderers in July 2005, signing a two-year contract. Betsy was a regular in the Wycombe team during the 2005–06 season. He was also a regular goalscorer for the club, most notably with a hat-trick against Mansfield Town in September 2005 and in April 2006. Betsy was honoured by his fellow professionals by being named in the Professional Footballers's Association (PFA) "Team Of The Year" for League Two and helped Wycombe reach the play-offs. Betsy's last game for Wycombe was a notable one, the League Cup semi final defeat against the eventual winners Chelsea at Stamford Bridge.

=== Bristol City ===
In January 2007, it was announced that Betsy had been signed by League One Bristol City for a fee of £200,000. He was ever present in the city line up helping the Robins gain Promotion to Championship, scoring once in the process against Northampton. Betsy joined Yeovil Town on loan in October 2007. He returned to Bristol City on 7 November as Yeovil could not afford to extend the loan, having scored once for Yeovil against Swansea City. He turned down a loan deal to Cheltenham Town in November 2007. On 31 January 2008, Betsy joined Walsall for the rest of the season on loan.

=== Southend United and return to Wycombe Wanderers ===
Betsy signed for Southend United on 7 August 2008, on a two-year contract.

On 1 September 2009, Betsy re-signed for Wycombe Wanderers on a loan until 2 January 2010. On 15 January 2010, after a successful loan, Betsy signed for Wycombe on a permanent basis until the end of the season, having been released from Southend. Betsy also led the team in assists with eight, scoring five goals and being voted (OWWSA) Wycombe Supporters Player of the year. In May 2010, Betsy agreed a new two-year deal with the club. Betsy was a regular in the Wycombe promotion side in 2010–11, but found first team opportunities limited in 2011–12, and left the club by mutual consent on 20 December 2011.

=== Return to Woking ===
On 17 February 2012, Betsy re-joined Woking as a free agent until the end of the 2011–12 season. After re-joining he has made a big impact in the team and in his fourth game back, he won two penalties in the space of five minutes. He went on to win the Conference South title with Woking having beaten Maidenhead United 1–0 away. After the success at the end of the 2011–12 season, Betsy signed on for another season at Woking. In June 2014, Betsy signed a new one-year contract. He remained at Woking until the end of the 2014–15 season before deciding to stop playing football so he could focus on his coaching career.

== International career ==
Betsy is of Seychellois descent and, after having rejected the chance to play for the Seychelles national team in 2005, was finally called into the squad and made his international debut against a visiting French league side on 3 June 2011, scoring twice in a 3–0 friendly victory. Betsy was called up to the Seychelles squad for the football tournament at the 2011 Indian Ocean Island Games. He started all five of the Seychelles' games in the tournament, scoring in the final against Mauritius, which finished 1–1. Betsy scored again in the resulting penalty shootout, which the Seychelles won 4–3.

== Coaching career ==
In 2016, he was appointed head of England under-15s, having previously coached youth teams at Fulham.

Having moved on to lead the U16 and U17 squads, Betsy was appointed head coach for England U18s on 24 September 2020.

On 3 August 2021, Betsy was appointed head coach of Arsenal U23s. In his single season at Arsenal U23, Betsy took them from a 10th-placed finish in 2020–21 under Steve Bould to a 3rd-place finish, whilst implementing a "very fluid possession-based style of play" and using various formations, mainly variations on the 3-5-2 and 4-3-3 formations.

On 6 June 2022, Betsy was announced as the new manager of EFL League Two club Crawley Town on an initial two-year contract. However, after a disastrous start to the league season Betsy left the club on 9 October 2022 following a 3–0 defeat to Grimsby Town which left the club bottom of the league. His most notable achievement was a 2–0 win over his former team Fulham in the EFL Cup.

On 29 November 2022, Betsy was appointed as a first team coach for Championship club Wigan Athletic as part of new manager Kolo Touré's entourage, however left the club following Touré's sacking after only seven matches.

On 19 June 2023, Betsy was announced as new assistant head coach at EFL League One club Cambridge United.

On 3 July 2024, he left Cambridge to join Championship club Queens Park Rangers as the first team individual development coach.

== Personal life ==
In 2010, Betsy was studying for a BA Honours Degree in Professional Sports Writing and Broadcasting at Staffordshire University.

== Career statistics ==
=== Club ===
Appearances and goals by club, season and competition
Club	Season	League			FA Cup		League Cup		Other		Total	
Club	Season	Division	Apps	Goals	Apps	Goals	Apps	Goals	Apps	Goals	Apps	Goals
Woking	1997–98	Football Conference										
Woking	1998–99	Football Conference										
Woking	Total											
Fulham	1998–99	Second Division	7	1	1	0	1	0	1 (Note: Appearance(s) in Football League Trophy)	0	10	1
Fulham	1999–2000	First Division	2	0	0	0	0	0	0	0	2	0
Fulham	2000–01	First Division	5	0	0	0	2	0	0	0	7	0
Fulham	2001–02	Premier League	1	0	0	0	0	0	0	0	1	0
Fulham	Total		15	1	1	0	3	0	1	0	20	1
AFC Bournemouth (loan)	1999–2000	Second Division	5	0	0	0	0	0	0	0	5	0
Hull City (loan)	1999–2000	Third Division	2	0	0	0	0	0	1	0	3	0
Barnsley (loan)	2001–02	First Division	5	0	0	0	0	0	0	0	5	0
Barnsley	2001–02	First Division	5	0	0	0	0	0	0	0	5	0
Barnsley	2002–03	Second Division	39	6	1	0	1	0	1	0	42	6
Barnsley	2003–04	Second Division	45	10	5	1	1	0	2	0	53	11
Barnsley	2004–05	League One	0	0	0	0	0	0	0	0	0	0
Barnsley	Total		94	16	6	1	2	0	3	0	105	17
Hartlepool United (loan)	2004–05	League One	6	1	0	0	1	0	0	0	7	1
Oldham Athletic	2004–05	League One	36	5	3	0	0	0	5	0	44	5
Wycombe Wanderers	2005–06	League Two	42	8	1	0	1	0	5 (Note: 3 appearances in Football League Trophy, 2 appearances in Football League Two play-offs)	0	49	8
Wycombe Wanderers	2006–07	League Two	29	5	2	0	7	0	2	0	40	5
Wycombe Wanderers	Total		71	13	3	0	8	0	7	0	89	13
Bristol City	2006–07	League One	17	1	0	0	0	0	0	0	17	1
Bristol City	2007–08	Championship	1	0	0	0	1	0	0	0	2	0
Bristol City	Total		18	1	0	0	1	0	0	0	19	1
Yeovil Town (loan)	2007–08	League One	5	1	0	0	0	0	1	0	6	1
Walsall (loan)	2007–08	League One	16	2	0	0	0	0	0	0	16	2
Southend United	2008–09	League One	41	3	4	0	1	0	1	0	47	3
Southend United	2009–10	League One	2	0	0	0	1	0	0	0	3	0
Southend United	Total		43	3	4	0	2	0	1	0	50	3
Wycombe Wanderers (loan)	2009–10	League One	20	1	2	0	0	0	0	0	22	1
Wycombe Wanderers	2009–10	League One	19	4	0	0	0	0	0	0	19	4
Wycombe Wanderers	2010–11	League Two	45	6	3	0	1	0	2	1	51	7
Wycombe Wanderers	2011–12	League One	3	0	0	0	1	0	2	1	6	1
Wycombe Wanderers	Total		67	10	3	0	2	0	4	2	76	12
Woking	2011–12	Conference South	12	3	0	0	—		0	0	12	3
Woking	2012–13	Conference Premier	46	13	1	0	—		2 (Note: Appearance(s) in FA Trophy)	1	49	14
Woking	2013–14	Conference Premier	46	8	1	0	—		2	0	49	8
Woking	2014–15	Conference Premier	34	2	2	0	—		5	1	41	3
Woking	Total		138	26	4	0	0	0	9	2	151	28
Career total			536	80	26	1	19	0	32	4	613	85

=== International ===
Appearances and goals by national team and year
National team	Year	Apps	Goals
Seychelles	2011	7	1
Total		7	1

Scores and results list Seychelles' goal tally first, score column indicates score after each Betsy goal.

List of international goals scored by Kevin Betsy
No.	Date	Venue	Opponent	Score	Result	Competition
1	13 August 2011	Stade Linite, Victoria, Seychelles	Mauritius	1–0	1–1	Indian Ocean Games 2011

== Honours ==
Seychelles

- Indian Ocean Island Games: Gold Medalist, 2011

Individual

- PFA Team of the Year: 2005–06 Football League Two
- Conference Premier Team of the Year: 2014–15
