= Mike Turner (footballer) =

English footballer (born 1938)

Personal information
- Full name: Michael George Elliott Turner
- Date of birth: 20 September 1938 (age 88)
- Place of birth: Bridport, Dorset, England
- Position: Goalkeeper

Senior career*
Years	Team	Apps	(Gls)
–1961	Dorchester Town		
1961–1964	Swindon Town	75	(0)
1964–1966	Torquay United	14	(0)
- * Club domestic league appearances and goals

Michael George Elliott Turner (born 20 September 1938) is an English former professional football goalkeeper.

== Football career ==
He was capped by England at youth level, but due to service in the RAF had to wait until December 1961 to turn professional when he joined Swindon Town from non-league Dorchester Town. He played 75 league games for Swindon and was part of Swindon's first ever promotion winning team in the 1962–63 season, before joining Torquay United in July 1964. He played 14 league games for Torquay over the next 2 seasons, before leaving the professional game.

He subsequently returned to Dorset, working for Plesseys for 20 years before retiring (in October 2006 he was living in Poole).

Turner is married with two children
