= Peter Sand =

Danish football player (born 1972)

Personal information
- Date of birth: 19 July 1972 (age 54)
- Place of birth: Hadsund, Denmark
- Height: 1.82 m (6 ft 0 in)
- Positions: Midfielder; forward

Youth career
- 1977–1994: Hadsund BK
- 1994–1996: Brøndby IF

Senior career*
Years	Team	Apps	(Gls)
1996–1998	Ølstykke FC		
1998–1999	Fremad Amager		
1999–2001	FC Midtjylland	75	(10)
2001–2002	Barnsley	6	(1)
2002–2004	Stabæk IF	61	(9)
2004–2006	SønderjyskE	?	(21)
2006–2007	AGF	31	(10)

Managerial career
- 2005–2006: SønderjyskE (assistant)
- 2007–2008: AGF (player-assistant)
- 2008: AGF (assistant)
- 2008–2012: AGF U13-U19 (physical coach)
- 2012–: Randers (physical coach)
- * Club domestic league appearances and goals

Peter Sand (born 19 July 1972) is a Danish former professional footballer who is the fitness coach for the Danish Superliga side Randers FC.

Peter is the twin brother of Ebbe Sand. Opposition fans in Denmark would often chant "Du ligner Ebbe Sand" (You look like Ebbe Sand) when he was playing. Both brothers played at Brøndby IF, though Peter did not play any first team games for the club.
