= Lee Crooks =

English footballer

Personal information
- Date of birth: 14 January 1978 (age 48)
- Place of birth: Wakefield, England
- Height: 6 ft 2 in (1.88 m)
- Positions: Defender; midfielder

Youth career
- Manchester City

Senior career*
Years	Team	Apps	(Gls)
1994–2001	Manchester City	76	(2)
2000–2001	→ Northampton Town (loan)	3	(0)
2001–2004	Barnsley	67	(0)
2004–2006	Bradford City	47	(1)
2006	→ Notts County (loan)	18	(1)
2006–2008	Rochdale	40	(0)
2008	Guiseley	9	(0)
2008	Ossett Town		
2025	Frickley Athletic	1	(0)
Total		261	(4)
- * Club domestic league appearances and goals

Lee Crooks (born 14 January 1978) is an English former professional footballer who played as a defender

As a combative defensive midfielder, Crooks made 282 competitive appearances in his playing career in the top four divisions of English football, including 251 in league competition. Possessing a powerful strike, he scored a total of 5 goals. He notably played in the Premier League for Manchester City and spent 6 years there during a turbulent period of relegations and promotions, including the 1999 Division 2 playoff final against Gillingham. He went on to play for Barnsley, Bradford City, Rochdale, as well as loan spells at Northampton Town and Notts County. He later had spells with non-league sides Guiseley and Ossett Town.

At age 32 he embarked on a new career in the British Armed Forces, joining the RAF Regiment, the infantry unit of the Royal Air Force.

== Early life ==
Crooks was born on 14 January 1978 in the city of Wakefield in West Yorkshire, England.

== Football career ==
=== Manchester City ===
Crooks was a product of the youth system at Manchester City. He also played for the England national football team at school level. As a club trainee, Crooks signed his first professional contract on 1 August 1994 (aged 16 years, 6 months, 18 days). By September 1996 he was being included in the first team squad for games by caretaker manager Asa Hartford as one of three promising youngsters.

City were relegated to Division 1 at the end of the 1995–96 season, and two years later, again, falling to Division 2, their lowest ever level. Through two successive promotions however, via the play-offs from Division 2 and then by automatic promotion from Division 1, the club had returned to the Premier League in the minimum time just 2 years later, in time for the start of the 2000–01 season.

Crooks was in the Manchester City team that won that 1999 Division 2 play off final at Wembley Stadium against Gillingham in dramatic fashion, albeit substituted on 85 minutes for Gareth Taylor. Having come back from a 2–0 deficit with 2 minutes remaining, City scored twice to take the game into extra time, and then after no further scores, winning the subsequent penalty shootout.

On 26 December 2000 he went out on loan to Northampton Town. He made 3 appearances before returning on 23 January 2001. On 7 March 2001 Crooks was sold by City to Barnsley for £190,000.

Crooks scored two goals for Manchester City, both in the league. It was three years before he scored his first goal, an equaliser against Chesterfield in an away game on 27 February 1999, which ended 1–1.

=== Barnsley ===
Crooks didn't make his debut until the start of the 2001–02 season, being delayed for several months as he had operations on an injured medial collateral ligament.

With new manager Paul Hart performing a summer clear out after the 2003–04 season, Crooks was given the chance to prove his fitness during the summer in order to earn a new contract. He was released by Barnsley on 28 June 2004, signing on 1 August 2004 for Bradford City.

=== Bradford City ===
In a total of 53 competitive appearances for Bradford he scored 2 goals. He scored once in 47 appearances in the league, with his other goal coming in the FA Cup (an equaliser against Tranmere in November 2005).

Due to limited first team opportunities he went out on loan to League Two side Notts County on 9 January 2006. He made 18 league appearances for Notts County under his former Barnsley manager Gudjon Thordarson, scoring 1 goal. After returning to Barnsley, on 8 May 2006 he was released by the club as surplus to requirements. He then entered talks with Notts County, but that did not lead to a contract.

=== Rochdale ===
As a free agent, Crooks began pre-season training with League Two side Rochdale, before signing a 12-month contract on 3 August 2006, linking up with his former Barnsley manager Steve Parkin. Crooks made 44 appearances for Rochdale, including 40 in the League. Crooks left Rochdale by mutual consent on 26 March 2008 due to limited opportunities, having made just 5 starts during that season, with no appearances since December 2007.

=== Later career ===
Crooks joined the West Yorkshire club Guiseley, playing in the Northern Premier League Premier Division. He also began training for an attempt to climb Mount Kilimanjaro in aid of Macmillan Cancer Support in June 2008.

On 31 December 2008 he moved from Guiseley to another West Yorkshire club, Ossett Town, playing in the Northern Premier League Premier Division.

Lee was appointed as assistant manager at Frickley Athletic in November 2024. And on 5 April 2025, he came out of retirement, making a substitute appearance for Frickley in their final Northern Counties East League Premier Division game against Penistone Church. In doing so, Lee became the oldest player to make an appearance for Frickley.

== Playing style ==
Icelander Gudjon Thordarson, his manager at Barnsley and Notts County, referred to Crooks as 'The Beast' due to his combativeness. Crooks said before his Notts County debut, "If there is a tackle to be won, I am in there. I do like a good tackle".

While not a prolific scorer, his first professional goal in 1999 was described by The Guardian as a "tremendous shot which thundered in off the post." Similarly, his FA Cup goal for Bradford City in 2005 was described by the BBC as powerful shot which cannoned off the bar and in.

In February 2009, Crooks was described by The Times as a "versatile defender and midfielder who ... had his most productive season in helping Manchester City win promotion in 1999".

== Military career ==
Lee Crooks
- Born: 14 January 1978 (age 48); Wakefield, England
- Military career
- Allegiance: United Kingdom
- Branch: Royal Air Force
- Service years: 2010–2015
- Rank: Leading Aircraftsman (LAC)
- Units: No. 1 Squadron, RAF Regiment

After quitting football, Crooks chose a new career path in the British Armed Forces. Choosing not to follow his younger brother into the British Army, Crooks instead signed up as an enlisted member (gunner) of the RAF Regiment, the infantry unit of the Royal Air Force, whose role is to provide force protection of RAF airfields and bases.

In February 2011 at 33 years old, he completed his seven months of RAF Regiment basic training, passing out as a leading aircraftman. Initially posted to No. 1 Squadron RAF Regiment based at RAF Honington in Suffolk, in the following weeks he underwent intensive training in the Sennybridge Training Area in Wales, and was due to visit the RAF Mount Pleasant base in the Falkland Islands followed by a deployment to the frontline in the War in Afghanistan, in early 2012.

Crooks left the RAF after five-years of service.

== Career statistics ==
Lee Crooks at the English National Football Archive (subscription required)

Club	Season	League			FA Cup		League Cup		Other		Total	
Club	Season	Division	Apps	Goals	Apps	Goals	Apps	Goals	Apps	Goals	Apps	Goals
Manchester City	1996–97	Division One	15	0	2	0	1	0	—		18	0
Manchester City	1997–98	Division One	5	0	0	0	0	0	—		5	0
Manchester City	1998–99	Division Two	34	1	3	0	0	0	3 (Note: Appearances in Division Two play-offs)	0	40	1
Manchester City	1999–00	Division One	20	1	0	0	4	0	—		24	1
Manchester City	2000–01	Premier League	2	0	0	0	2	0	—		4	0
Manchester City	Total		76	2	5	0	7	0	3	0	91	2
Northampton Town (loan)	2000–01	Division Two	3	0	—		—		—		3	0
Barnsley	2001–02	Division One	26	0	1	0	2	0	—		29	0
Barnsley	2002–03	Division Two	18	0	0	0	0	0	0	0	18	0
Barnsley	2003–04	Division Two	23	0	1	0	0	0	2 (Note: Appearances in Football League Trophy)	0	26	0
Barnsley	Total		67	0	2	0	2	0	2	0	73	0
Bradford City	2004–05	League One	32	1	0	0	1	0	1	0	34	1
Bradford City	2005–06	League One	15	0	1	1	2	0	1	0	19	1
Bradford City	Total		47	1	1	1	3	0	2	0	53	2
Notts County (loan)	2005–06	League Two	18	1	—		—		—		18	1
Rochdale	2006–07	League Two	31	0	0	0	1	0	2	0	34	0
Rochdale	2007–08	League Two	9	0	1	0	0	0	0	0	10	0
Rochdale	Total		40	0	1	0	1	0	2	0	44	0
Guiseley	2007–08	Northern Premier League Premier Division	5	0	—		—		—		5	0
Guiseley	2008–09	Northern Premier League Premier Division	4	0	0	0	—		0	0	4	0
Guiseley	Total		9	0	0	0	—		0	0	9	0
Career total			260	4	9	1	13	0	9	0	291	5

== Honours ==
Manchester City

- Football League Second Division play-offs: 1999
