= Bruce Dyer =

English footballer (born 1975)

Personal information
- Full name: Bruce Antonio Dyer
- Date of birth: 13 April 1975 (age 51)
- Place of birth: Ilford, England
- Height: 6 ft 0 in (1.83 m)
- Position: Striker

Youth career
- 1990–1993: Watford

Senior career*
| Years | Team | Apps | (Gls) |
| 1993–1994 | Watford | 31 | (6) |
| 1994–1998 | Crystal Palace | 135 | (37) |
| 1998–2003 | Barnsley | 181 | (59) |
| 2003–2005 | Watford | 67 | (12) |
| 2005–2006 | Stoke City | 11 | (0) |
| 2005–2006 | → Millwall (loan) | 11 | (2) |
| 2006 | Sheffield United | 5 | (1) |
| 2006–2008 | Doncaster Rovers | 15 | (1) |
| 2007 | → Bradford City (loan) | 5 | (1) |
| 2007 | → Rotherham United (loan) | 3 | (0) |
| 2008 | Chesterfield | 3 | (0) |
| 2008 | York City | 2 | (0) |
| Total | | 469 | (119) |

International career
| 1994–1997 | England U21 | 11 | (4) |
- * Club domestic league appearances and goals

Bruce Antonio Dyer (born 13 April 1975) is an English former professional footballer.

His career started in 1993 with Watford, before he became the country's first £1 million-teenager when he joined Crystal Palace in 1994. He spent five years with Palace, playing over 100 games, and then another five years with Barnsley, before he returned to Watford. After leaving Watford in 2005 he played for Stoke City, Millwall, Sheffield United, Doncaster Rovers, Bradford City, Rotherham United, Chesterfield and York City. Dyer also represented England at under-21 level, scoring four goals in 11 games.

== Club career ==
Dyer was introduced to football when his parents got him into the Watford youth football system in September 1990, becoming a trainee following the conclusion of his studies in July 1991. Dyer made his first team debut as a substitute in Watford's 1–0 win against Birmingham City on 17 April 1993. He signed a professional contract with the club two days later. He made one further appearance in the First Division in the 1992–93 season, against Oxford United. He made 29 league appearances and scored six goals during the 1993–94 season before being sold to Crystal Palace on 10 March 1994 for a fee of £1.1 million, which made him the first teenager (16-19 year old) in English football to be transferred for a fee over £1 million. He finished the remainder of the season with 11 appearances for Palace. Dyer spent his first full season at the club playing in the FA Premier League, making 16 league appearances and scoring one goal. His first hat-trick for the club came in a victory over Birmingham City on 27 February 1996. Palace were relegated back to the First Division for the 1995–96 season and he scored 13 goals in 35 league appearances. The next season saw Palace earn promotion back to the Premier League, with Dyer being the club's top scorer with 18 goals in 51 appearances. Dyer's second and final hat-trick for Palace came in a 3–0 victory over Leicester City in the FA Cup on 24 January 1998. He finished as top scorer for the second successive season after scoring eight goals in 30 appearances in the 1997–98 season as the team were relegated to the First Division.

Dyer joined fellow First Division team Barnsley for £700,000 on 23 October 1998, after having made nine appearances and scored two goals for Palace up to that point during the 1998–99 season. He finished the season with 30 appearances and eight goals for Barnsley. A proposed move to Gillingham in September 2000 was called off by Barnsley manager Dave Bassett after Dyer failed to agree personal terms with the club. He scored three goals in the club's 5–2 win over Birmingham City in the 1999–2000 First Division play-off semi-final. He started the Final, but was substituted for Ǵorǵi Hristov in the 64th minute, with the match eventually being lost 4–2 to Ipswich Town. Dyer was again linked with a move to Gillingham in April 2002, but their manager Andy Hessenthaler rejected reports they were preparing a bid for him. His contract at Barnsley expired in the summer of 2003, whose manager Glyn Hodges hoped he would accept a cut in his wages in order to remain at the club. He however failed to agree terms on a new contract and later returned to Watford, who he eventually signed for on a two-year contract on 26 June.

Having returned to the club where he started his career, Dyer faced competition for a starting place from Heiðar Helguson and Danny Webber. In 2003–04 he made 18 starting league appearances, scoring three goals. His strike rate improved the following season, with 9 goals from his 21 league starts. Despite being in good form, Dyer did not score in any of his six appearances following the arrival of new manager Aidy Boothroyd, and was released by Watford in May 2005. After spending a week on trial at Stoke City, he signed for the Championship club on a one-year deal. He joined Millwall on a two-month loan on 4 November and made his debut a day later in a 3–1 defeat against Crewe Alexandra. He scored two goals against Sheffield United, which earned Millwall a 2–2 draw, and finished his loan spell with 10 appearances. After making 12 appearances for Stoke, he was released in January and subsequently signed for Sheffield United on a contract until the end of the 2005–06 season. He scored on his debut against Reading, giving his side the lead after nine minutes, but a Dave Kitson equaliser three minutes later saw the match end in a 1–1 draw. However, he was unable to score again in a further four appearances and joined Doncaster Rovers on 2 June 2006 on a free transfer. His Doncaster debut came in a 1–0 defeat to Carlisle United on the opening day of the 2006–07 season and scored with a low 20-yard shot during his second game against Crewe, which finished as a 3–1 victory. He joined Bradford City on a month's loan on 31 January 2007 and scored eight minutes into his debut against Nottingham Forest, with the match eventually finishing in a 2–2 draw. He finished his loan spell with five appearances for the club. After returning to Doncaster, he played in seven matches for the team, finishing the season with 17 appearances.

He made his first appearance of the 2007–08 season as a 57th-minute substitute for Mark McCammon in Doncaster's 5–1 victory over Bradford in the Football League Trophy, after which he joined Rotherham United on a one-month loan on 13 September 2007. With Rotherham striker Tom Cahill out injured, he went straight into the game against Wrexham, which was won 1–0, with Chris O'Grady scored the winning goal. He returned to Doncaster on 4 October, finishing his loan spell with three appearances. He was released by Doncaster on 31 January 2008, having made one appearance for the team during the season, after which he eventually joined Chesterfield on 27 March 2008 on a contract that lasted until the end of the season. He made his debut in a 4–1 victory over Shrewsbury Town, in which he assisted David Dowson for the fourth goal. Manager Lee Richardson had yet to decide on Dyer's future at Chesterfield when he had issued the retained list in April, after he had made three substitute appearances for the team. Richardson later said in June that if he was not able to find a new club, he could return to Chesterfield for pre-season training.

He returned to Bradford City in October 2008, for whom he was training with and featured in a reserves game. Bradford lost 2–1 to York City, with Dyer scoring Bradford's only goal. However, manager Stuart McCall said Dyer was only with the club to regain fitness following an injury, while four days after the match, York manager Colin Walker revealed he was interested in signing Dyer. York eventually signed him on 3 November, on a contract that would expire in January 2009. Dyer made his debut for York in a 1–1 draw against Mansfield Town in the Conference League Cup third round, being substituted off in the 64th minute for Adam Boyes, in a match that was won 4–2 on a penalty shootout after extra time. This was followed by his league debut, which finished in a 2–1 defeat to Torquay United; York's first home defeat of the 2008–09 season. A hamstring injury forced himself to miss York's following game, a 1–0 defeat to Cambridge United, as . He returned to the team in a 2–2 draw against Crawley Town, during which he assisted Onome Sodje for the opening goal. Dyer was forced to miss training due to joint stiffness and was unavailable for York's game against Salisbury City, but regained his fitness for the game against Barrow in the Conference League Cup. This game was postponed and his hamstring injury forced him to miss further games. He retired from football on 23 December after being limited to three games with York because of back and hamstring injuries.

== International career ==
Born in England, Dyer is of Jamaican and Montserratian descent. He gained 11 caps and scored four goals for the England under-21 team. He received a call-up to the Jamaica national team after this goalscoring form in the 1997–98 season, but he opted to turn them down to wait for England. Later in his career, he represented Montserrat in a friendly game against Ashford Town in September 2007.

== Personal life ==
Dyer was born in Ilford, London.

Dyer is a Christian, which he, along with his wife Janine, claimed to help him carry on with his footballing career.

== Career statistics ==
Appearances and goals by club, season and competition
| Club | Season | League | | | FA Cup | | League Cup | | Other^{[A]} | | Total | |
| Club | Season | Division | Apps | Goals | Apps | Goals | Apps | Goals | Apps | Goals | Apps | Goals |
|---|---|---|---|---|---|---|---|---|---|---|---|---|
| Watford | 1992–93 | First Division | 2 | 0 | 0 | 0 | 0 | 0 | 0 | 0 | 2 | 0 |
| Watford | 1993–94 | First Division | 29 | 6 | 1 | 0 | 4 | 2 | 2 | 1 | 36 | 9 |
| Watford | Total | | 31 | 6 | 1 | 0 | 4 | 2 | 2 | 1 | 38 | 9 |
| Crystal Palace | 1993–94 | First Division | 11 | 0 | 0 | 0 | 0 | 0 | 0 | 0 | 11 | 0 |
| Crystal Palace | 1994–95 | Premier League | 16 | 1 | 3 | 0 | 3 | 1 | 0 | 0 | 22 | 2 |
| Crystal Palace | 1995–96 | First Division | 35 | 13 | 1 | 1 | 4 | 0 | 2 | 0 | 42 | 14 |
| Crystal Palace | 1996–97 | First Division | 43 | 17 | 2 | 1 | 3 | 0 | 3 | 0 | 51 | 18 |
| Crystal Palace | 1997–98 | Premier League | 24 | 4 | 4 | 4 | 1 | 0 | 0 | 0 | 29 | 8 |
| Crystal Palace | 1998–99 | First Division | 6 | 2 | 0 | 0 | 3 | 0 | 0 | 0 | 9 | 2 |
| Crystal Palace | Total | | 135 | 37 | 10 | 6 | 14 | 1 | 5 | 0 | 164 | 44 |
| Barnsley | 1998–99 | First Division | 28 | 7 | 2 | 1 | 0 | 0 | 0 | 0 | 30 | 8 |
| Barnsley | 1999–2000 | First Division | 32 | 6 | 1 | 0 | 4 | 0 | 3 | 3 | 40 | 9 |
| Barnsley | 2000–01 | First Division | 38 | 15 | 1 | 0 | 4 | 1 | 0 | 0 | 43 | 16 |
| Barnsley | 2001–02 | First Division | 44 | 14 | 2 | 1 | 3 | 3 | 0 | 0 | 49 | 18 |
| Barnsley | 2002–03 | Second Division | 40 | 17 | 1 | 1 | 1 | 0 | 0 | 0 | 42 | 18 |
| Barnsley | Total | | 181 | 57 | 7 | 3 | 12 | 4 | 3 | 3 | 203 | 67 |
| Watford | 2003–04 | First Division | 32 | 3 | 1 | 0 | 2 | 0 | 0 | 0 | 35 | 3 |
| Watford | 2004–05 | Championship | 36 | 9 | 2 | 0 | 6 | 2 | 0 | 0 | 44 | 11 |
| Watford | Total | | 68 | 12 | 3 | 0 | 8 | 2 | 0 | 0 | 79 | 14 |
| Stoke City | 2005–06 | Championship | 11 | 0 | 0 | 0 | 1 | 0 | 0 | 0 | 12 | 0 |
| Millwall (loan) | 2005–06 | Championship | 10 | 2 | 0 | 0 | 0 | 0 | 0 | 0 | 10 | 2 |
| Sheffield United | 2005–06 | Championship | 5 | 1 | 0 | 0 | 0 | 0 | 0 | 0 | 5 | 1 |
| Doncaster Rovers | 2006–07 | League One | 15 | 1 | 1 | 0 | 0 | 0 | 1 | 0 | 17 | 1 |
| Doncaster Rovers | 2007–08 | League One | 0 | 0 | 0 | 0 | 0 | 0 | 1 | 0 | 1 | 0 |
| Doncaster Rovers | Total | | 15 | 1 | 1 | 0 | 0 | 0 | 2 | 0 | 18 | 1 |
| Bradford City (loan) | 2006–07 | League One | 5 | 1 | 0 | 0 | 0 | 0 | 0 | 0 | 5 | 1 |
| Rotherham United (loan) | 2007–08 | League Two | 3 | 0 | 0 | 0 | 0 | 0 | 0 | 0 | 3 | 0 |
| Chesterfield | 2007–08 | League Two | 3 | 0 | 0 | 0 | 0 | 0 | 0 | 0 | 3 | 0 |
| York City | 2008–09 | Conference Premier | 2 | 0 | 0 | 0 | 0 | 0 | 1 | 0 | 3 | 0 |
| Career total | | | 469 | 119 | 22 | 9 | 39 | 9 | 13 | 4 | 543 | 141 |

A. The "Other" column constitutes appearances and goals in the Anglo-Italian Cup, Conference League Cup, Football League Trophy and Football League play-offs.

== Honours ==
Crystal Palace

- Football League First Division play-offs: 1997

Doncaster Rovers

- Football League Trophy: 2006–07

Individual

- Barnsley Player of the Season: 2001–02, 2002–03
