= Kevin Dixon (footballer, born 1980) =

English footballer

Personal information
- Full name: Kevin Robert Dixon
- Date of birth: 27 June 1980 (age 46)
- Place of birth: Easington, England
- Height: 5 ft 9 in (1.75 m)
- Position: Midfielder

Youth career
- –1998: Leeds United

Senior career*
Years	Team	Apps	(Gls)
1998–2001	Leeds United	0	(0)
1999	→ York City (loan)	3	(0)
2001–2004	Barnsley	0	(0)
2002–2003	→ Doncaster Rovers (loan)	0	(0)
- * Club domestic league appearances and goals

Kevin Robert Dixon (born 27 June 1980) is an English former professional footballer. He was born in Easington, County Durham. He has represented England at youth international level.

== Career ==
Born in Easington, County Durham, Dixon began his career as a trainee with Leeds United, but failed to make the first team at Elland Road. He joined York City on loan in August 1999, making his league debut on 7 August in a 1–0 win at home to Swansea City. He played twice more in the league for York, with a further appearance in the League Cup, at home to Wigan Athletic, before returning to Leeds United at the end of his one-month loan spell.

In October 2000 Dixon had a trial with Aberdeen, Leeds coach Roy Aitken having recommended Dixon to his former club. However, his trial was cut short due to personal circumstances.

Dixon was released by Leeds at the end of the 2000–01 season, joining Barnsley in July 2001. However, he fractured a shin after just three days of pre-season training and was out for the following season. In an attempt to regain match fitness, Dixon joined Doncaster Rovers on loan in October 2002, but only to play reserve games. Dixon was released by Barnsley in September 2003.

Dixon later joined Seaham Red Star, leaving them to join Durham City in December 2004.

In November 2005, Dixon joined Kettering Town from Seaham Red Star as one of manager Paul Gascoigne's signings. However, the move did not work out and he returned to Seaham Red Star in January 2006.

Dixon joined Horden Colliery Welfare in February 2006 and was sent off for violent conduct after 10 minutes of his club debut.

Dixon then had brief spells at Newcastle Blue Star and at Sunderland Ryhope, before joining Bishop Auckland early in the 2007–08 season.

Dixon had a brief spell as manager of Seaham Red Star Reserves in 2015-16.

He also helped to form and managed Sunday league side Dawdon Welfare Park FC. Under Dixon's guidance Dawdon would become the first Sunday league side from Seaham to win the prestigious Durham FA Sunday Cup in 2021.
