= Rory Fallon =

New Zealand footballer (born 1982)

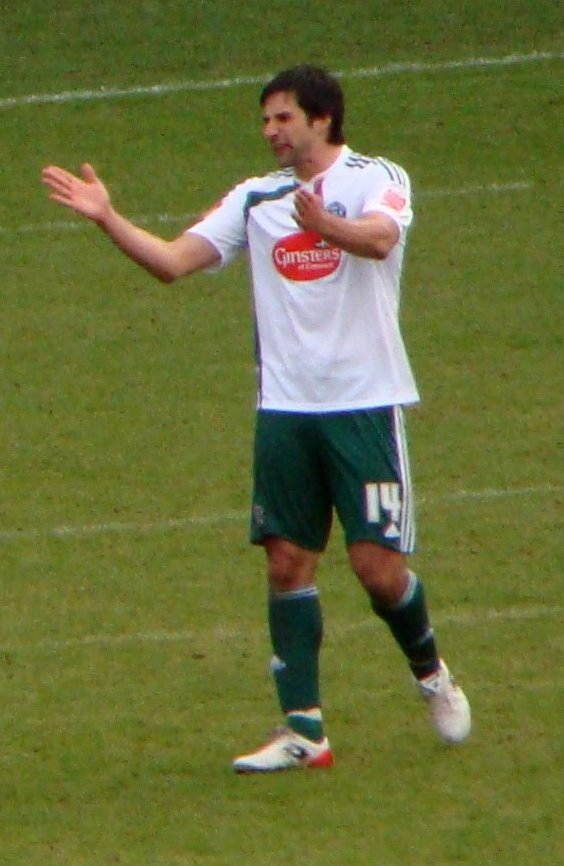
- Fallon playing for Plymouth Argyle in 2009

Personal information
- Full name: Rory Michael Fallon
- Date of birth: 20 March 1982 (age 44)
- Place of birth: Gisborne, New Zealand
- Height: 1.91 m (6 ft 3 in)
- Position: Forward

Team information
- Current team: Auckland FC Reserves (head coach)

Youth career
- Mount Albert Grammar
- Barnsley

Senior career*
Years	Team	Apps	(Gls)
1999–2003	Barnsley	52	(11)
2001–2002	→ Shrewsbury Town (loan)	11	(0)
2003–2006	Swindon Town	77	(22)
2005	→ Yeovil Town (loan)	6	(1)
2006–2007	Swansea City	44	(13)
2007–2011	Plymouth Argyle	149	(22)
2010–2011	→ Ipswich Town (loan)	6	(1)
2011	Yeovil Town	5	(0)
2011–2013	Aberdeen	37	(3)
2013–2014	St Johnstone	8	(1)
2014	Crawley Town	8	(0)
2014–2015	Scunthorpe United	4	(3)
2016	Bristol Rovers	3	(0)
2016	Truro City	12	(0)
2017	Torquay United	5	(0)
2017	Dorchester Town	1	(0)
Total		428	(77)

International career
2009–2017	New Zealand	24	(6)

Managerial career
- 2019–2022: New Zealand (assistant)
- 2023–2024: Waterside Karori
- 2024–2025: Upper Hutt City
- 2026–: Auckland FC Reserves
- * Club domestic league appearances and goals

Rory Michael Fallon (born 20 March 1982) is a New Zealand former professional footballer who played predominantly as a forward.

He previously played for Barnsley, Shrewsbury Town, Swindon Town, Swansea City, Plymouth Argyle, Ipswich Town, Yeovil Town, Aberdeen, St Johnstone, Bristol Rovers, Scunthorpe United, Dorchester Town. He was also capped by New Zealand a total of 24 times, scoring 6 goals. He represented his country at both the 2010 FIFA World Cup and 2016 Nations Cup. He was born and raised in Gisborne. His father Kevin managed New Zealand over a four-year period in the 1980s. He retired from professional football in November 2017.

== Playing career ==
=== Club career ===
Born in Gisborne, Fallon started his career at Barnsley, becoming a professional in 1999 after moving up through their trainee programme. He had just begun to cement his place in the first-team when he suffered a stress fracture of his foot, which saw him struggle to regain his place.

Fallon was signed for an undisclosed fee by Swindon Town in November 2003 after a number of impressive performances against them with Barnsley, which caught the eye of manager Andy King. After breaking into the team he scored a number of important goals in the 2003–04 campaign; including an overhead kick from the edge of the box to secure a point against Bristol City.

Despite the departure of Tommy Mooney, Fallon found himself regularly on the bench in the 2004–05 season. He was loaned out to Yeovil Town to increase his confidence and he scored on his debut against Scunthorpe United. He failed to score in the remainder of the season, but a red card for kicking Huddersfield Town defender David Mirfin in the face meant he missed the opening two games of the following season. After Sam Parkin was sold in summer 2005, Fallon was given greater opportunities to play at Swindon, scoring on his return to action against Nottingham Forest.

He signed for League One team Swansea City in January 2006 for a fee believed to be £300,000, the second highest fee ever paid by the Welsh club. A productive year followed for the striker, scoring 13 goals in all competitions from 48 appearances. This prompted interest from Championship side Plymouth Argyle and they paid £300,000 for Fallon on 19 January 2007.

Fallon had only started a handful of games for Plymouth Argyle, and had struggled to get into the team. He went without a competitive goal at Home Park until 19 January 2008, exactly one-year after he signed for the club, when he scored a second half equaliser against Southampton. It was only his fourth goal for the Pilgrims. The 2007–2008 campaign saw Fallon continue to be a regular bench warmer, but he continued with his optimistic attitude that he can become a first team regular, and even rejected a £250,000 move to League One side Southend United, in January 2008.

On 29 September 2009, Fallon scored the winning goal for Plymouth against Peterborough United earning the Pilgrims their first win of the season after seven straight defeats, lifting them off the bottom of the table. Fallon then scored the opening goal in Argyle's next game against Scunthorpe United which they also won 2–1.

On the opening day of the 2010–11 season, Fallon played the full 90 minutes and was the provider for Luke Summerfield's winning goal in Plymouth's 1–0 win over pre-season promotion favourites Southampton. In November, he joined Ipswich Town on short loan, returning to Plymouth in January.

In August 2011, Fallon signed a one-month contract with Yeovil Town after a short trial and featured in all five of Yeovil's games during that period.

In September 2011, he signed a two-year deal with Scottish Premier League club Aberdeen. Fallon's time at Aberdeen was notable for his performances in the 2011–12 Scottish Cup. After scoring in Aberdeen's 4–0, 4th round victory over Forfar Athletic, he set up Aberdeen's opener in the 5th round 2–1 win over Queen of the South. Fallon then scored both goals in the 2–1 quarter final win against Motherwell to become the Player of the Round. Although Aberdeen lost the semi-final at Hampden Park 2–1 against Hibernian, Fallon's second half equaliser went on to be voted the PFA Goal of the Season. On 13 May 2013 Fallon was released by Aberdeen having scored three league goals in 35 appearances.

Fallon joined Scottish Premier League side St Johnstone in July 2013 on a free transfer, the deal was completed in time for Fallon to play a part, if called upon, in St Johnstone's UEFA Europa League second qualifying round tie against Norwegian Tippeligaen side Rosenborg. On 31 January 2014, Fallon left St Johnstone by mutual consent.

In February 2014, Fallon joined Crawley Town until the end of the 2013–14 season.

In September 2014, Fallon joined Scunthorpe United on a short-term deal. Fallon scored on his Scunthorpe début in a 3–2 loss to Oldham Athletic on 27 September 2014.

In January 2016, Fallon joined Bristol Rovers on non-contract terms until the end of the season. He made his debut as a 76th-minute substitute, in a 1–0 loss to Accrington Stanley F.C. In the summer of 2016, he Joined National League South club, Truro City F.C. as a player-coach but had his contract cancelled by mutual consent in December 2016.

On 26 July 2017, Fallon joined National League side Torquay United, on non-contract terms, ahead of the 2017–18 season. He played one match for Dorchester Town.

=== International career ===
Despite being born in New Zealand and having a father who coached New Zealand at the 1982 World Cup, Fallon chose to represent England at junior level. He played international football for England at U16, U17, U18, U19 and U20 levels and switched when FIFA changed the eligibility rules.

He did, however, represent New Zealand in an unofficial U-16 World Cup in France in 1998, the Montaigu Tournament, where Wynton Rufer was the coach. Shortly after, he departed for England to be an apprentice at Barnsley.

In January 2006, New Zealand coach Ricki Herbert suggested that Fallon might still get a chance to represent New Zealand at senior level. Herbert claimed that the only reason why Fallon wasn't picked was due to lack of correspondence from FIFA regarding this matter. Fallon had until he was 21 years old to get clearance from FIFA to change his association. It found, however, that Fallon did not apply in the 2004 window to change allegiance for over-21s players. This year-long window was made available by FIFA upon introduction of a rule which allows players with dual nationality to switch their allegiance before their 21st birthday. Under this criterion Fallon could not be available for New Zealand.

On 3 June 2009, FIFA Congress passed a motion removing the age limit for changing associations for players who had already played for a country's national team at youth level under article 18 of the Regulations Governing the Application of the FIFA Statutes. This allowed for the possibility of Fallon again representing New Zealand.

In August 2009, Fallon was called up to the New Zealand squad for a friendly against Jordan the following month and the crucial two-legged World Cup play-off matches against Bahrain later in the year. Fallon scored on debut in the match against Jordan, which New Zealand won 3–1.

On 14 November 2009, Fallon headed home the only goal just before half-time in the second leg of New Zealand's World Cup qualifier against Bahrain, to send New Zealand to the FIFA World Cup in South Africa, their first appearance at the finals in 28 years. Fallon played in all three of New Zealand's finals games.

He was recalled into the New Zealand camp for their World Cup play-off loss to Peru in November 2017. Following these matches, he announced his international retirement.

== Coaching career ==
After retiring, Fallon worked with Plymouth Argyle's under-14 players. In mid-October 2019, Fallon was appointed assistant manager for the New Zealand national football team under manager Danny Hay.

In November 2021, Fallon was appointed head of youth development at Wellington Phoenix, also coaching the under-19s team before becoming manager Waterside Karori of the Central League in December 2023. In January 2024, Waterside Karori announced that they had ended Fallon's contract by way of mutual consent before the season started.

In February 2024, Upper Hutt City announced Fallon as their head coach for the 2024 season.

On 29 January 2026, Fallon was announced as head coach of the Auckland FC Reserves, replacing Luke Casserly, who took up the role of head coach of the club's new Auckland FC (OFC) squad.

== Career statistics ==
=== Club ===
Appearances and goals by club, season and competition
Club	Season	League			Cup		League Cup		Other		Total	
Club	Season	Division	Apps	Goals	Apps	Goals	Apps	Goals	Apps	Goals	Apps	Goals
Barnsley	1999–2000	First Division	0	0	0	0	0	0	0	0	0	0
Barnsley	2000–01	First Division	1	0	0	0	0	0	0	0	1	0
Barnsley	2001–02	First Division	9	0	0	0	1	0	0	0	10	0
Barnsley	2002–03	Second Division	26	7	1	0	1	0	1	0	29	7
Barnsley	2003–04	Second Division	16	4	0	0	1	0	1	0	18	4
Barnsley	Total		52	11	1	0	3	0	2	0	58	11
Shrewsbury Town (loan)	2001–02	Third Division	11	0	0	0	0	0	0	0	11	0
Swindon Town	2003–04	Second Division	19	6	0	0	0	0	2	1	21	7
Swindon Town	2004–05	League One	31	3	3	0	2	0	3	1	39	4
Swindon Town	2005–06	League One	25	12	1	1	1	0	2	1	29	14
Swindon Town	Total		77	22	4	1	3	0	7	3	91	26
Yeovil Town (loan)	2004–05	League Two	6	1	0	0	0	0	0	0	6	1
Swansea City	2005–06	League One	17	4	0	0	0	0	3	1	20	5
Swansea City	2006–07	League One	24	8	3	0	1	0	0	0	28	8
Swansea City	Total		41	12	3	0	1	0	3	1	48	13
Plymouth Argyle	2006–07	Championship	15	1	0	0	0	0	0	0	15	1
Plymouth Argyle	2007–08	Championship	29	7	1	0	2	0	0	0	32	7
Plymouth Argyle	2008–09	Championship	44	5	1	0	1	0	0	0	47	5
Plymouth Argyle	2009–10	Championship	33	5	2	0	1	0	0	0	36	5
Plymouth Argyle	2010–11	League One	28	4	1	0	1	0	1	0	31	4
Plymouth Argyle	Total		149	22	5	0	5	0	1	0	160	22
Ipswich Town (loan)	2010–11	Championship	6	1	0	0	0	0	0	0	6	1
Yeovil Town	2011–12	League One	5	0	0	0	1	0	0	0	6	0
Aberdeen	2011–12	Scottish Premier League	21	2	5	4	1	1	0	0	27	7
Aberdeen	2012–13	Scottish Premier League	14	1	2	1	0	0	0	0	16	2
Aberdeen	Total		35	3	7	5	1	1	0	0	43	9
St Johnstone	2013–14	Scottish Premiership	8	1	1	0	1	0	2	0	12	1
Crawley Town	2013–14	League One	8	0	0	0	0	0	0	0	8	0
Scunthorpe United	2014–15	League One	4	3	0	0	0	0	1	0	5	3
Bristol Rovers	2015–16	League Two	3	0	0	0	0	0	0	0	3	0
Truro City	2016–17	National League South	12	0	0	0	0	0	2	0	14	0
Torquay United	2017–18	National League	5	0	0	0	0	0	0	0	5	0
Dorchester Town	2017–18	SFL Premier Division	1	0	0	0	0	0	1	0	2	0
Career total			423	76	21	6	15	1	19	4	478	87

=== International goals ===
New Zealand score listed first, score column indicates score after each Fallon goal.

International goals by date, venue, cap, opponent, score, result and competition
No.	Date	Venue	Cap	Opponent	Score	Result	Competition
1	9 September 2009	King Abdullah II Stadium, Amman, Jordan	1	Jordan	2–1	3–1	Friendly
2	14 November 2009	Wellington Regional Stadium, Wellington, New Zealand	3	Bahrain	1–0	1–0	2010 FIFA World Cup qualification
3	4 June 2010	Ljudski vrt, Maribor, Slovenia	7	Slovenia	1–1	1–3	Friendly
4	19 November 2013	Wellington Regional Stadium, Wellington, New Zealand	17	Mexico	2–3	2–4	2014 FIFA World Cup qualification
5	28 May 2016	Sir John Guise Stadium, Port Moresby, Papua New Guinea	19	Fiji	2–0	3–1	2018 FIFA World Cup qualification
6	31 May 2016	Sir John Guise Stadium, Port Moresby, Papua New Guinea	20	Vanuatu	4–0	5–0	2016 OFC Nations Cup

== Managerial statistics ==
As of match played 29 January 2026

Managerial record by team and tenure

== Honours ==
New Zealand

- OFC Nations Cup: 2016; third place: 2012

Individual

- IFFHS Oceania Men's Team of All Time: 2021

== Personal life ==
Fallon's mother, Mere, is of Māori descent. He has a brother called Sean and a sister called Bianca.

Fallon owns a business selling ice cream for businesses and events across Yorkshire and Devon.
