= Chris Lumsdon =

English former association football player (born 1979)

Personal information
- Full name: Christopher Lumsdon
- Date of birth: 15 December 1979 (age 46)
- Place of birth: Newcastle, England
- Height: 5 ft 11 in (1.80 m)
- Position: Midfielder

Senior career*
Years	Team	Apps	(Gls)
1997–2001	Sunderland	2	(0)
2000	→ Blackpool (loan)	6	(1)
2000	→ Crewe Alexandra (loan)	16	(0)
2001	→ Barnsley (loan)	12	(2)
2001–2004	Barnsley	73	(11)
2004–2009	Carlisle United	167	(18)
2009–2010	Darlington	2	(0)
Total		280	(32)
- * Club domestic league appearances and goals

Christopher Lumsdon (born 15 December 1979 in Newcastle upon Tyne) is an English former professional footballer. A midfielder, he played twice for Sunderland in the Premier League, forming part of their Championship title-winning team of 1998–99. He later played for Barnsley and Carlisle United, where he won the 2005 Conference National play-off final and the 2005–06 Football League Two Championship title. A short spell at Darlington followed, before he was forced to retire through injury in July 2010.

During his time at Sunderland, he was sent out on loan to Blackpool, Crewe Alexandra and Barnsley.

== Club career ==
=== Sunderland ===
Lumsdon began his career at Sunderland, making his first-team debut against Wolverhampton Wanderers on 7 February 1998. In the same week, he signed a five-year professional contract, and was also called up to the England under-18 squad. He was part of the Sunderland squad that won the Championship title in the 1998–99 season under manager Peter Reid.

After Sunderland were promoted to the Premier League, Lumsdon impressed in pre-season matches against Rangers and Sampdoria in the centre of midfield. He made his Premier League debut on the first day of the 1999–2000 season against Chelsea at Stamford Bridge. Lumsdon remained part of the first-team squad over the next three seasons, as Sunderland enjoyed consecutive 7th-place finishes.

A loan spell to Blackpool was arranged in 2000, in order that he gain first team experience. A successful sixteen-match loan at Crewe Alexandra in the Championship followed, with manager Dario Gradi submitting bids in the region of £500,000 for his services.

His final game for Sunderland was a League Cup encounter against Walsall on 14 September 1999. He played the full game in a 3–2 win.

Lumsdon was offered a new long-term contract by Peter Reid to extend his stay at Sunderland, however, Chris stated he wanted to play more regularly and rejected the contract to pursue a move to the Championship.

=== Barnsley ===
Lumsdon signed for Championship side Barnsley for £500,000 in December 2001, with substantial add-on fees attached to the deal based on appearances. He went on to make 28 starts from October in his first season in the Championship, scoring 9 goals. He collected the Supporters' Player of the Year award after strong performances, especially against Wolves and Portsmouth and Newcastle United. However, although his form was good, his contract stipulated that Sunderland would receive a payment from Barnsley after Lumsdon made a certain number of appearances; as Barnsley were enduring financial difficulty, they could not afford to select Lumsdon on several occasions.

=== Carlisle United ===
In 2004, Lumsdon joined Paul Simpson's ambitious Carlisle United, where his wages were funded by former Gretna owner Brooks Mileson. He played a major part in the Cumbrians' promotion through the play-offs back into the Football League, winning sixteen man of the match awards at Brunton Park, and collecting the Players' Player of the Year award as well as Paul Simpson's Manager's Player of the Year.

A year later, he was again another major part of the team who were runaway winners of the League Two title, in which he won the League 2 Player of the Month award twice. He also played at the Millennium Stadium against Swansea City in a 2–1 defeat in the Football League Trophy final.

The 2007–08 season was a near miss for Carlisle and Lumsdon; he excelled on the pitch, but Carlisle were narrowly beaten by Leeds United in the play-off semi-finals through a late Jonny Howson goal. At the season's conclusion, he was rated the top midfielder in the Premier League and Football League by The Sunday Sun newspaper, beating Nicky Butt, Scott Parker and Julio Arca to this title.

In a pre-season match in the summer of 2008 against Partick Thistle, Lumsdon suffered a serious back injury; in his absence, Carlisle struggled in League One, but he managed to make six appearances towards the end of the 2008–09 season upon his return.

Lumsdon left Carlisle United in May 2009, when it was clear his back injury was causing him too much pain to play at the level required.

=== Darlington ===
Upon his release by Carlisle, Lumsdon joined Darlington in League Two, hoping dropping a division would help his injury recovery, however, after only three games, he had a recurrence of his previous back injury and required surgery.

In July 2010, Lumsdon retired from football at the age of 30 due to injury.

== After football ==
Following his retirement from football, Lumsdon works for Radio Cumbria as part of their Carlisle United commentary team, and writes weekly articles for the News and Star publication for Cumbria. He has also been employed by Carlisle United as their club ambassador.

Chris started a new business venture in 2021 called Lumsdon Elite Coaching, which specialises in football coaching and mental health sessions.

== Honours ==
Sunderland

- Football League First Division: 1998–99

Carlisle United

- Football League Two: 2005–06
- Conference National play-offs: 2005
- Football League Trophy runner-up: 2005–06

Individual

- Barnsley Supporters' Player of the Year: 2001–02
- Carlisle United Manager's Player of the Year: 2005–06
- Carlisle United Players' Player of the Year: 2005–06
- Carlisle United Player of the Year: 2007–08
