= Brian O'Callaghan =

Irish footballer

Personal information
- Date of birth: 24 February 1981 (age 45)
- Place of birth: Limerick, Ireland
- Position: Centre-back

Senior career*
Years	Team	Apps	(Gls)
1998–2004	Barnsley	97	(1)
2004–2005	Keflavik	6	
2005–2006	Notts County	36	(1)
2006–2008	Cork City	32	(1)
2006–2008	Halifax Town	?	(?)
2009–2013	Limerick	42	(3)
2014–2017	Regional United	?	(?)
- * Club domestic league appearances and goals

Brian O'Callaghan (born 24 February 1981) is an Irish professional footballer, plays for his home town club Limerick in the League of Ireland Premier Division. He began his career at Barnsley, where he scored once against Mansfield. After leaving Barnsley, O'Callaghan joined Notts County for whom he scored once against Wycombe Wanderers.
