= Carl Barrowclough =

English footballer

Personal information
- Full name: Carl William Barrowclough
- Date of birth: 25 September 1981 (age 45)
- Place of birth: Doncaster, England
- Height: 5 ft 7 in (1.70 m)
- Position: Winger

Youth career
- –: Barnsley

Senior career*
Years	Team	Apps	(Gls)
2001–2003	Barnsley	12	(0)
2003–2004	Leigh RMI	14	(2)
2004–2005	Hyde United	24	(3)
Total		50	(5)
- * Club domestic league appearances and goals

Carl William Barrowclough (born 25 September 1981) is an English former professional footballer who played as a winger.

== Career ==
Born in Doncaster, Barrowclough made his professional debut with Barnsley in March 2001, making a total of 12 appearances in the Football League between then and 2003. After leaving Barnsley in October 2003, Barrowclough went on trial with Doncaster Rovers, before signing for non-League side Leigh RMI a day later. Barrowclough later played for Hyde United.

== Personal life ==
His father Stewart Barrowclough was also a professional footballer.
