= Adam Forshaw =

English footballer

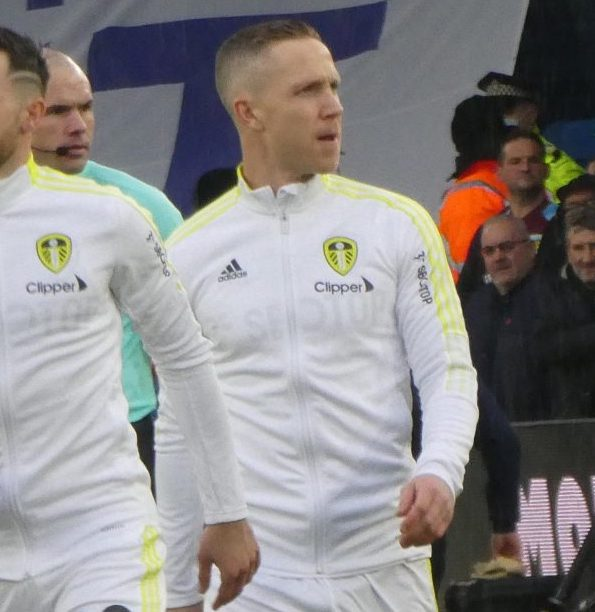
- Forshaw with Leeds United in 2022

Personal information
- Full name: Adam John Forshaw
- Date of birth: 8 October 1991 (age 35)
- Place of birth: Liverpool, England
- Height: 5 ft 9 in (1.74 m)
- Position: Midfielder

Team information
- Current team: Blackburn Rovers
- Number: 28

Youth career
- 2000–2010: Everton

Senior career*
Years	Team	Apps	(Gls)
2009–2012	Everton	1	(0)
2012	→ Brentford (loan)	7	(0)
2012–2014	Brentford	82	(11)
2014–2015	Wigan Athletic	16	(1)
2015–2018	Middlesbrough	92	(2)
2018–2023	Leeds United	83	(0)
2023–2024	Norwich City	6	(0)
2024–2025	Plymouth Argyle	29	(0)
2025–	Blackburn Rovers	43	(2)
- * Club domestic league appearances and goals as of 17:11, 16 October 2026 (UTC)

Adam John Forshaw (born 8 October 1991) is an English professional footballer who plays as a midfielder for EFL Championship club Blackburn Rovers.

Forshaw began his career in the academy at Premier League side Everton and came to prominence at Brentford, with whom he won the 2013–14 League One Player of the Year award.

== Club career ==
=== Everton ===
Forshaw joined the Everton academy at the age of seven. Prior to the beginning of the 2008–09 season, he was offered a place as a first-year scholar and soon claimed a regular place in the U18 squad. Towards the end of an injury-hit 2008–09 season, Forshaw made his reserve team debut on 29 March 2009, playing the full 90 minutes of a 2–0 win over Wigan Athletic. Everton's first team manager David Moyes gave Forshaw his competitive debut in a Europa League group stage match against BATE Borisov on 17 December 2009, in which he played the full 90 minutes. Forshaw was an unused substitute on two other occasions during the 2009–10 season and was the leading appearance-maker for the reserve team.

Forshaw made his Premier League debut as an 82nd-minute substitute in a 3–0 win over Wolverhampton Wanderers on 9 April 2011 and was an unused substitute for a further three league games towards the end of the 2010–11 season. Forshaw signed a one-year contract extension in June 2011 and was an unused substitute for the first team on two occasions during the 2011–12 season. He spent one month away on loan towards the end of the season and won the reserve team's Player of the Year award. Forshaw was not offered a new contract and was released in May 2012.

=== Brentford ===
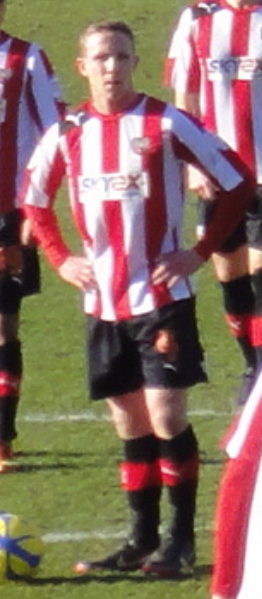
Forshaw standing over a Brentford free kick in January 2013.

On 24 February 2012, Forshaw joined League One club Brentford on a one-month youth loan. He made his debut the following day as a 69th-minute substitute for Sam Saunders in a 0–0 draw with Scunthorpe United. Forshaw made seven appearances and returned to Everton after sustaining a broken jaw in a 2–0 victory over Rochdale on 24 March.

Forshaw joined Brentford permanently on a two-year contract for an undisclosed fee in May 2012. He scored the first professional goal of his career in a 1–0 victory over Oldham Athletic on 22 September 2012. Forshaw received the first red card of his career after picking up a second yellow card in a 2–1 league victory over Crawley Town on 26 February 2013. After Brentford missed out on automatic promotion to the Championship following a 1–0 defeat to Doncaster Rovers, it was Forshaw who scored the winning penalty in the playoff semi-final shoot-out against Swindon Town to send the Bees to the final. Forshaw played in the final against Yeovil Town at Wembley Stadium, but a 2–1 defeat consigned Brentford to another season in League One. He made 53 appearances during the 2012–13 season and scored three goals.

Forshaw signed a new three-year contract on 27 June 2013 and scored his first goal of the 2013–14 season in a 3–1 victory over Sheffield United on 10 August. With the absence of regular penalty taker Kevin O'Connor through injury, Forshaw assumed the role and scored his third penalty of the season (his fifth goal overall) in a 3–0 away league victory over Preston North End on 21 December. A run of 24 consecutive league starts ended when he was left out of the squad for a 2–0 win over Port Vale at Griffin Park on 11 January 2014 due to a calf problem. On 16 March, Forshaw was named as the 2014 League One Player of the Year. Forshaw was sent off for the second time of his career in a 1–0 defeat to Swindon Town on 12 April and owing to being suspended, he was absent for Brentford's automatic promotion-clinching 1–0 victory over Preston North End on 18 April. His final appearance of the season came in a 2–2 draw with Milton Keynes Dons on 21 April and the following day, he underwent surgery to correct a long-standing ankle problem. Forshaw made 40 appearances during the 2013–14 season and scored eight goals. He was also named in the League One PFA Team of the Year and in the League One Team of the Year.

After missing Brentford's first 2014–15 pre-season friendly in July 2014, manager Mark Warburton stated that Forshaw would be available for the final pre-season games. In early August, Forshaw was told to stay away from the club's training ground after two "totally unacceptable" bids for the player were received from Championship rivals Wigan Athletic, managed by former Brentford manager Uwe Rösler. After missing the early regular-season matches with a hamstring strain, it was announced on 25 August that Wigan Athletic had met Brentford's valuation of Forshaw and he was free to talk with the Latics. Forshaw departed the club on 1 September and made 100 appearances and scored 11 goals during his two spells with the club.

=== Wigan Athletic ===
On 1 September 2014, Forshaw joined Championship side Wigan Athletic on a four-year contract for an undisclosed fee, believed to be approximately £2.5 million. The move reunited him with his former Brentford manager Uwe Rösler, but the move proved to be an abortive one, with Rösler being dismissed in November 2014 and after 17 appearances and one goal, Forshaw left the DW Stadium on 28 January 2015.

=== Middlesbrough ===
On 28 January 2015, Forshaw joined Championship club Middlesbrough on a 3 1/2-year contract for an undisclosed fee, believed to be £2 million. In what remained of the 2014–15 season, he made 20 appearances and experienced another playoff final defeat, when he was an unused substitute as Middlesbrough were defeated 2–0 by Norwich City.

Forshaw made 34 appearances and scored two goals during a successful 2015–16 season, in which Middlesbrough clinched automatic promotion to the Premier League with a second-place finish. He signed a new four-year contract in August 2016 and in November was reported to have been scouted for the England national side by manager Gareth Southgate. He made 35 appearances during a disappointing 2016–17 season, at the end of which Middlesbrough were relegated straight back to the Championship.

Forshaw managed 14 appearances during the first half of the 2017–18 season before departing the club in January 2018. During three years at the Riverside, Forshaw made 79 appearances and scored two goals.

=== Leeds United ===
On 18 January 2018, Forshaw transferred to Championship club Leeds United for a reported £4.5 million fee and signed a four-and-a-half-year contract. Forshaw made his Leeds debut starting in Leeds' 0–0 draw against Hull City on 30 January 2018. After starting for the side since his debut, on 24 February Forshaw missed Leeds' 1–0 win against his former side Brentford with his wife going into labour. He aggravated a previous calf injury against Sheffield Wednesday on 17 March, which limited his number of performances before the end of the season. During the 2018 preseason, Forshaw sustained a toe injury which on 3 August was reported to require surgery and keep him out for up to eight weeks. He returned from injury on 15 September, as a substitute in the 1–1 draw against Millwall. Forshaw was praised for his performance in a newer role as defensive midfielder in a 2–0 win against Derby County on 11 January 2019, with Yorkshire Evening Post journalist Phil Hay describing it as "arguably his best for Leeds".

During the 2018–19 season, Forshaw played 32 games in all competitions, after Leeds finished the regular season in third place. Leeds qualified for the playoffs and Forshaw started the first leg for Leeds in their semi-final playoff match against sixth-placed Derby County, but was replaced by Jamie Shackleton after an injury in the first half during a 1–0 win at Pride Park. However, Leeds were beaten 4–3 on aggregate over the two legs. With Forshaw out injured, Leeds lost 4–2 in an encounter at Elland Road that saw Derby progress to the final against Aston Villa. He featured prominently in the documentary Take Us Home, documenting the Leeds's 2018–19 season, on Amazon Prime, released in August 2019.

On 8 August 2019, it was reported that Leeds had rejected bids for Forshaw during the 2019 transfer window in order to keep him at the club. Forshaw started the 2019–20 season strongly alongside Mateusz Klich and Kalvin Phillips in central midfield, but after seven games suffered a hip injury. The injury was at first judged to be minor, but on 4 January 2020 after 16 weeks out injured, head coach Marcelo Bielsa said that Forshaw was still trying to recover from his hip injury. In February, Forshaw was sent to the Steadman Clinic in Colorado, United States, for surgery and was ruled out of the rest of the season.

After the English professional football season was paused in March 2020 due to the impact of the COVID-19 pandemic on association football, the season was resumed during June, where Forshaw earned promotion with Leeds to the Premier League, who also became EFL Championship Champions for the 2019–20 season in July after the successful resumption of the season.

By January 2021, Forshaw had missed more games for Leeds out injured than he had actually played a part in, with Bielsa stating at a 25 January press conference: "Forshaw is a professional who looks after his health very much, that's why I think that as soon as his injury problems are resolved he will be able to compete very quickly." On 16 April 2021, Forshaw returned to action playing 82 minutes in a Leeds U23 match versus Aston Villa U23, although he sustained a minor hamstring injury which kept him out for another period of time.

Following a successful preseason, Forshaw made his first start for nearly two years for Leeds' senior team in a competitive game, playing the first hour of a League Cup match against Crewe Alexandra on 24 August 2021. Forshaw played his first league game of the 2021–22 season against Southampton in October, coming on as a 64th-minute substitute for Rodrigo. On 7 November, Forshaw was in the starting lineup for Leeds against Leicester City, his first Premier League start in over four years. In January 2022, Forshaw extended his Leeds contract until the end of the 2022–23 season with the option to extend for a further year. On 13 June 2023, Leeds announced that Forshaw's contract would not be renewed, and he would leave the club at the end of the 2022–23 season.

=== Norwich City ===
On 26 August 2023, Norwich City signed Forshaw on a free transfer. He made his first appearance for The Canaries three days later as a substitute in a League Cup tie and, after a handful of other substitute Championship and League Cup games, was named in the starting XI on 4 October 2023 in a league defeat at Swansea City.

=== Plymouth Argyle ===
On 19 January 2024, Forshaw joined Championship club Plymouth Argyle on a free transfer having had his contract with Norwich City terminated. He made his first appearance for The Pilgrims in a 3–1 win at Home Park over Cardiff City on 20 January 2024.

=== Blackburn Rovers ===
On 11 January 2025, Forshaw joined Championship side Blackburn Rovers on a short-term deal until the end of the season, having terminated his contract with Plymouth.

On 15 February 2025, Forshaw scored his first goal for Blackburn, and his first goal in nine years, against former club Plymouth Argyle in a 2–0 win.

On 19 May 2025, the club announced that the Forshaw would depart in June upon the expiry of his contract, having made 17 appearances in all competitions. On 19 June 2025, Forshaw re-joined Blackburn Rovers on a one-year contract.

Forshaw scored his second goal for the club and his first for the 2025–26 season in a 1–1 draw with Stoke City. Forshaw was later voted player of the month for March. On 30 April, Forshaw signed a one-year contract extension until the end of the 2026–27 season.

== Career statistics ==
As of match played 5 September 2026

Appearances and goals by club, season and competition
Club	Season	League			FA Cup		League Cup		Other		Total	
Club	Season	Division	Apps	Goals	Apps	Goals	Apps	Goals	Apps	Goals	Apps	Goals
Everton	2009–10	Premier League	0	0	0	0	0	0	1 (Note: Appearance in UEFA Europa League)	0	1	0
Everton	2010–11	Premier League	1	0	0	0	0	0	—		1	0
Everton	2011–12	Premier League	0	0	0	0	0	0	—		0	0
Everton	Total		1	0	0	0	0	0	1	0	2	0
Brentford	2011–12	League One	7	0	0	0	0	0	—		7	0
Brentford	2012–13	League One	43	3	6	0	1	0	3 (Note: Appearances in League One play-offs)	0	53	3
Brentford	2013–14	League One	39	8	1	0	0	0	—		40	8
Brentford	Total		89	11	7	0	1	0	3	0	100	11
Wigan Athletic	2014–15	Championship	16	1	1	0	0	0	—		17	1
Middlesbrough	2014–15	Championship	18	0	—		—		2 (Note: Appearance(s) in Championship play-offs)	0	20	0
Middlesbrough	2015–16	Championship	29	2	1	0	4	0	—		34	2
Middlesbrough	2016–17	Premier League	34	0	0	0	1	0	0	0	35	0
Middlesbrough	2017–18	Championship	11	0	0	0	3	0	0	0	14	0
Middlesbrough	Total		92	2	1	0	8	0	2	0	103	2
Leeds United	2017–18	Championship	12	0	0	0	0	0	—		12	0
Leeds United	2018–19	Championship	30	0	1	0	0	0	1	0	32	0
Leeds United	2019–20	Championship	7	0	0	0	1	0	—		8	0
Leeds United	2020–21	Premier League	0	0	0	0	0	0	—		0	0
Leeds United	2021–22	Premier League	22	0	1	0	3	0	—		26	0
Leeds United	2022–23	Premier League	12	0	0	0	1	0	—		13	0
Leeds United	Total		83	0	2	0	5	0	1	0	91	0
Norwich City	2023–24	Championship	6	0	1	0	2	0	—		9	0
Plymouth Argyle	2023–24	Championship	13	0	—		—		—		13	0
Plymouth Argyle	2024–25	Championship	16	0	—		1	0	0	0	17	0
Plymouth Argyle	Total		29	0	0	0	1	0	0	0	30	0
Blackburn Rovers	2024–25	Championship	16	1	1	0	—		—		17	1
Blackburn Rovers	2025–26	Championship	22	1	0	0	—		—		22	1
Blackburn Rovers	2026–27	Championship	5	0	0	0	1	0	—		6	0
Blackburn Rovers	Total		43	2	1	0	1	0	—		45	2
Career total			359	16	13	0	18	0	7	0	397	16

== Honours ==
Brentford

- Football League One runner-up: 2013–14

Middlesbrough

- Football League Championship runner-up: 2015–16

Leeds United

- EFL Championship: 2019–20

Individual

- PFA Team of the Year: 2013–14 League One
- Football League One Team of the Year: 2013–14
- Everton U21 Player of the Season: 2011–12
- Football League One Player of the Year: 2013–14
