= Raphaël Calvet =

French footballer (born 1994)

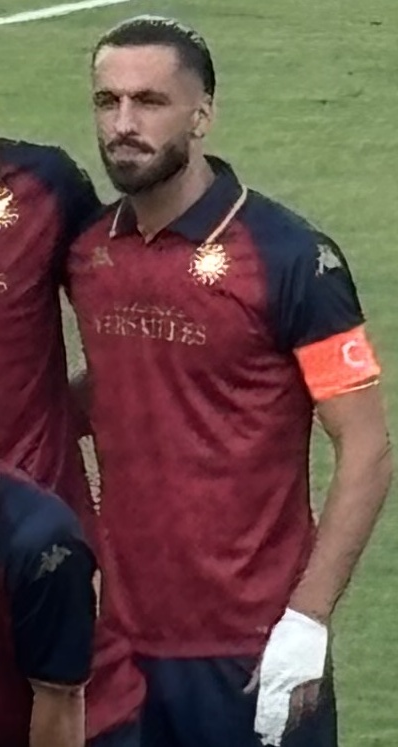
- Calvet with Versailles in 2026

Personal information
- Full name: Raphaël Calvet
- Date of birth: 7 February 1994 (age 32)
- Place of birth: Auxerre, France
- Height: 1.84 m (6 ft 0 in)
- Position: Defender

Team information
- Current team: Versailles
- Number: 5

Youth career
- 2000–2004: CAV St. Georges
- 2004–2011: Auxerre

Senior career*
Years	Team	Apps	(Gls)
2011–2013	Auxerre B	39	(0)
2012–2013	Auxerre	1	(0)
2013–2015	Brentford	0	(0)
2016	Auxerre B	2	(0)
2016–2018	Annecy	44	(4)
2018–2019	Le Mans	13	(0)
2018–2019	Le Mans B	7	(0)
2019–2022	Sedan	58	(0)
2022–2024	Martigues	57	(0)
2024–	Versailles	52	(2)

International career
2009–2010	France U16	12	(3)
2010–2011	France U17	20	(1)
2011–2012	France U18	8	(0)
2013–2014	France U20	4	(0)
- * Club domestic league appearances and goals as of 14:23, 9 August 2026 (UTC)

Raphaël Calvet (born 7 February 1994) is a French professional footballer who plays as a defender for Ligue 3 club Versailles.

Calvet is a product of the Auxerre youth system and after failing to break into the first team squad, he moved to England to join Brentford in 2013. Again a fringe player, he returned to France in 2016 and entered lower-league football. Calvet represented France at youth level.

== Club career ==
=== Auxerre ===
After beginning his youth career with CAV St. Georges, Calvet joined his hometown club AJ Auxerre in 2004 and progressed through the youth teams. He made his debut for the club's reserve team in the Championnat de France amateur at the end of the 2010–11 season. Calvet made his first team debut in a 1–1 Ligue 2 draw at Châteauroux in November 2012, starting the match and playing the full 90 minutes. He was an unused substitute on a further three occasions during Auxerre's 2012–13 campaign. Following a meniscus tear and the arrival of Bernard Casoni as manager, Calvet was not called into the first team squad in 2013. He departed AJ Auxerre in September 2013.

=== Brentford ===
Calvet joined English League One club Brentford on transfer deadline day in September 2013 and signed a three-year contract for an undisclosed fee. He made his debut in a 2–1 Football League Trophy second round defeat to Peterborough United on 8 October and played the full 90 minutes. Under new first team manager Mark Warburton, Calvet received his maiden call into a league squad on 1 March 2014 and remained an unused substitute during a 0–0 draw with Carlisle United. Calvet finished the 2013–14 season with 15 appearances for the Development Squad and one first team appearance.

Calvet spent the entire 2014–15 Championship season out of first team contention and instead made 19 appearances for the Development Squad. Calvet was absent during Brentford's entire 2015–16 pre-season and he joined Sporting Gijón B on trial in August 2015, but failed to win a contract. Calvet departed Griffin Park on 3 November 2015, after having made just one appearance in just over two years with the Bees.

=== Return to Auxerre ===
Calvet rejoined AJ Auxerre in a non-professional capacity in January 2016. After recovering his fitness, he made two appearances for the B team in what remained of the 2015–16 season.

=== Annecy ===
On 27 September 2016, Calvet joined Championnat de France Amateur club Annecy on a two-year contract. He scored the first senior goal of his career on his eighth appearance, in a 3–1 victory over Le Puy Foot 43 Auvergne. He finished the 2016–17 season with 18 appearances, three goals and signed a new two-year contract in May 2017. Calvet made 27 appearances and scored one goal during the 2017–18 season, which culminated in a second-place finish behind the promoted team, Villefranche. He departed the club in July 2018, after making 45 appearances and scoring two goals during two seasons at the Parc des Sports.

=== Le Mans ===
On 4 July 2018, it was announced that Calvet had joined newly-promoted Championnat National club Le Mans on a one-year contract. He made just 14 appearances and departed by mutual consent at the end of the 2018–19 season.

=== Sedan ===
In July 2019, Calvet joined Championnat National 2 club Sedan on a free transfer and made 21 appearances during the truncated 2019–20 season. As a result of the 2020–21 season being declared null and void in April 2021, Calvet finished the season with 13 appearances. He was retained for the 2021–22 season and captained the club to a top-half finish. Despite being offered a new contract in December 2021, Calvet opted to allow his contract to expire. During three seasons with Sedan, he made 63 appearances.

=== Martigues ===
On 12 July 2022, Calvet transferred to Championnat National club Martigues. He made 58 appearances over the course of the 2022–23 and 2023–24 seasons, with the latter campaign culminating in promotion to Ligue 2. Calvet was released at the end of the 2023–24 season.

=== Versailles ===
In July 2024, Calvet signed a two-year contract with Championnat National club Versailles on a free transfer. He made 28 appearances and scored two goals during a 2024–25 season in which the club narrowly avoided relegation. Calvet made 25 appearances during the 2025–26 season, in which the club narrowly missed the playoff place. Calvet signed a new two-year contract in May 2026.

== International career ==
Calvet captained the France U16, U17 and U18 squads and played in the 2011 European U17 Championship and the 2011 U17 World Cup. He received his first call up to the France U20 squad for the 2013 Jeux de la Francophonie and made his debut in a 3–0 group stage defeat to Congo. He went on to win three further U20 caps.

== Career statistics ==
As of match played 7 August 2026

Appearances and goals by club, season and competition
Club	Season	League			National cup (Note: Includes Coupe de France, FA Cup)		League cup (Note: Includes Coupe de la Ligue, Football League Cup)		Other		Total	
Club	Season	Division	Apps	Goals	Apps	Goals	Apps	Goals	Apps	Goals	Apps	Goals
Auxerre B	2010–11	CFA	1	0	—		—		—		1	0
Auxerre B	2011–12	CFA	25	0	—		—		—		25	0
Auxerre B	2011–12	CFA 2	1	0	—		—		—		1	0
Auxerre B	2012–13	CFA	12	0	—		—		—		12	0
Auxerre B	Total		39	0	—		—		—		39	0
Auxerre	2012–13	Ligue 2	1	0	0	0	0	0	—		1	0
Brentford	2013–14	League One	0	0	0	0	0	0	1 (Note: Appearance in Football League Trophy)	0	1	0
Auxerre B	2015–16	CFA	2	0	—		—		—		2	0
Auxerre B	Total		41	0	—		—		—		41	0
Annecy	2016–17	CFA	18	3	—		—		—		18	3
Annecy	2017–18	National 2	26	1	1	0	—		—		27	1
Annecy	Total		44	4	1	0	—		—		45	4
Le Mans	2018–19	National	13	0	1	0	0	0	0	0	14	0
Le Mans B	2018–19	National 3	7	0	—		—		—		7	0
Sedan	2019–20	National 2	21	0	—		—		—		21	0
Sedan	2020–21	National 3	8	0	5	0	—		—		13	0
Sedan	2021–22	National	29	0	0	0	—		—		29	0
Sedan	Total		58	0	5	0	—		—		63	0
Martigues	2022–23	National	23	0	—		—		—		23	0
Martigues	2023–24	National	34	0	1	0	—		—		35	0
Martigues	Total		57	0	1	0	—		—		58	0
Versailles	2024–25	National	26	2	2	0	—		—		28	2
Versailles	2025–26	National	25	0	0	0	—		—		25	0
Versailles	2026–27	Ligue 3	1	0	0	0	—		—		1	0
Versailles	Total		52	2	2	0	—		—		54	2
Career total			273	6	10	0	0	0	1	0	284	6

== Honours ==
Martigues

- Championnat National second-place promotion: 2023–24
