= 2015–16 Middlesbrough F.C. season =

Middlesbrough
2015–16 season
- Chairman: Steve Gibson
- Manager: Aitor Karanka
- Stadium: Riverside Stadium
- Football League Championship: 2nd (promoted)
- FA Cup: Third round
- League Cup: Quarter-finals
- Top goalscorer: League: David Nugent (8 Goals); All: Cristhian Stuani (11 goals)
Home colours	Away colours

The 2015–16 season was Middlesbrough's seventh consecutive season in the Football League Championship in their 140th year in existence. Along with the Championship, the club also competed in the FA Cup and Football League Cup. The season covers the period from 1 July 2015 to 30 June 2016.

== Statistics ==
=== Appearances and goals ===
Last updated 12 July 2016
"+" constitutes substitute appearances

No.	Pos	Nat	Player	Total		Championship		FA Cup		League Cup	
No.	Pos	Nat	Player	Apps	Goals	Apps	Goals	Apps	Goals	Apps	Goals
1	GK	(Greece) GRE	Dimitrios Konstantopoulos	48	0	46	0	0	0	2	0
3	DF	(England) ENG	George Friend	45	1	39+1	1	1	0	3+1	0
4	DF	(Spain) ESP	Daniel Ayala	39	3	34+1	3	1	0	3	0
5	DF	(Belgium) BEL	Ritchie De Laet (on loan from Leicester City)	10	0	9+1	0	0	0	0	0
6	DF	(England) ENG	Ben Gibson	43	1	39+1	1	0	0	3	0
7	MF	(England) ENG	Grant Leadbitter	46	4	39+2	4	0	0	4+1	0
8	MF	(England) ENG	Adam Clayton	48	1	41+2	1	1	0	2+2	0
9	FW	(Scotland) SCO	Jordan Rhodes	18	6	13+5	6	0	0	0	0
10	MF	(Uruguay) URU	Carlos De Pena	10	0	3+3	0	1	0	3	0
13	GK	(Spain) ESP	Tomás Mejías	6	0	0	0	1	0	5	0
16	DF	(Belgium) BEL	Julien De Sart	2	0	0+2	0	0	0	0	0
17	DF	(England) ENG	James Husband	1	0	0	0	0	0	1	0
18	FW	(Uruguay) URU	Cristhian Stuani	40	11	20+16	7	0+1	0	3	4
19	MF	(England) ENG	Stewart Downing	49	3	40+5	3	0	0	2+2	0
20	MF	(England) ENG	Adam Reach	6	1	3+1	1	0	0	1+1	0
21	MF	(Uruguay) URU	Gastón Ramírez	18	7	15+3	7	0	0	0	0
22	DF	(England) ENG	Dael Fry	8	0	7	0	0	0	0+1	0
23	FW	(Spain) ESP	Kike Sola (on loan from Athletic Bilbao)	2	0	1+1	0	0	0	0	0
24	MF	(Equatorial Guinea) GEQ	Emilio Nsue	46	3	37+3	3	0+1	0	4+1	0
26	DF	(Czech Republic) CZE	Tomáš Kalas (on loan from Chelsea)	30	0	19+7	0	1	0	3	0
27	MF	(Ghana) GHA	Albert Adomah	47	8	36+7	6	1	0	2+1	2
34	MF	(England) ENG	Adam Forshaw	34	2	9+20	2	1	0	3+1	0
35	MF	(England) ENG	David Nugent	40	8	24+14	8	1	0	0+1	0
39	DF	(England) ENG	Jonathan Woodgate	1	0	0	0	0	0	1	0
Players who appeared for Middlesbrough but left during the season:
9	FW	(Spain) ESP	Kike	24	4	10+9	4	0+1	0	4	0
16	DF	(England) ENG	Jack Stephens	5	0	0+1	0	0	0	3+1	0
29	MF	(Venezuela) VEN	Fernando Amorebieta (on loan from Fulham)	16	0	11+2	0	1	0	2	0
30	MF	(Netherlands) NED	Yanic Wildschut	2	1	1	0	0	0	1	1
31	MF	(Italy) ITA	Diego Fabbrini	26	6	14+8	4	1	1	2+1	1
36	MF	(Argentina) ARG	Bruno Zuculini (on loan from Manchester City)	6	0	3+2	0	0	0	0+1	0

=== Top scorers ===
Last updated 12 July 2016

Rank	Pos.	No.	Name	Championship	FA Cup	League Cup	Total
1	FW	18	(Uruguay) Cristhian Stuani	7	0	4	11
2=	MF	27	(Ghana) Albert Adomah	6	0	2	8
2=	FW	35	(England) David Nugent	8	0	0	8
4	MF	21	(Uruguay) Gastón Ramírez	7	0	0	7
5=	MF	31	(Italy) Diego Fabbrini	4	1	1	6
5=	FW	9	(Scotland) Jordan Rhodes	6	0	0	6
7=	FW	9	(Spain) Kike	4	0	0	4
7=	MF	7	(England) Grant Leadbitter	4	0	0	4
9=	DF	4	(Spain) Daniel Ayala	3	0	0	3
9=	MF	17	(England) Stewart Downing	3	0	0	3
9=	DF	24	(Equatorial Guinea) Emilio Nsue	3	0	0	3
12	MF	34	(England) Adam Forshaw	2	0	0	2
13=	MF	8	(England) Adam Clayton	1	0	0	1
13=	DF	3	(England) George Friend	1	0	0	1
13=	DF	6	(England) Ben Gibson	1	0	0	1
13=	MF	20	(England) Adam Reach	1	0	0	1
13=	MF	30	(Netherlands) Yanic Wildschut	0	0	1	1

=== Disciplinary record ===
Number	Nation	Position	Name	Total		Championship		FA Cup		League Cup	
Number	Nation	Position	Name	Yellow card	Red card	Yellow card	Red card	Yellow card	Red card	Yellow card	Red card
8	MF	(England) ENG	Adam Clayton	13	0	13	0	0	0	0	0
7	MF	(England) ENG	Grant Leadbitter	12	0	11	0	0	0	1	0
4	DF	(Spain) ESP	Daniel Ayala	6	0	6	0	0	0	0	0
29	DF	(Venezuela) VEN	Fernando Amorebieta	6	0	5	0	0	0	1	0
27	MF	(Ghana) GHA	Albert Adomah	5	0	4	0	0	0	1	0
18	FW	(England) ENG	Cristhian Stuani	5	0	4	0	0	0	1	0
6	DF	(England) ENG	Ben Gibson	4	1	4	1	0	0	0	0
3	DF	(England) ENG	George Friend	4	0	2	0	1	0	1	0
31	MF	(Italy) ITA	Diego Fabbrini	4	0	4	0	0	0	0	0
35	FW	(England) ENG	David Nugent	3	1	3	1	0	0	0	0
10	MF	(Uruguay) URU	Carlos De Pena	3	0	3	0	0	0	0	0
24	MF	(Equatorial Guinea) GEQ	Emilio Nsue	2	0	2	0	0	0	0	0
19	FW	(England) ENG	Stewart Downing	1	0	1	0	0	0	0	0
26	DF	(Czech Republic) CZE	Tomáš Kalas	1	0	1	0	0	0	0	0
9	FW	(Spain) ESP	Kike	1	0	1	0	0	0	0	0
23	FW	(Spain) ESP	Kike Sola	1	0	1	0	0	0	0	0
34	MF	(England) ENG	Adam Forshaw	1	0	0	0	1	0	0	0
21	MF	(Uruguay) URU	Gastón Ramírez	1	0	1	0	0	0	0	0
9	FW	(Scotland) SCO	Jordan Rhodes	1	0	1	0	0	0	0	0

== Transfers ==
=== Transfers in ===
Date from	Position	Nationality	Name	From	Fee	Ref.
6 July 2015	DF	ENG	Alex Baptiste	Bolton Wanderers	Free	
16 July 2015	MF	ENG	Stewart Downing	West Ham United	£5,500,000	
7 August 2015	FW	URU	Cristhian Stuani	Espanyol	£3,600,000	
14 August 2015	FW	ENG	David Nugent	Leicester City	£4,000,000	
1 September 2015	MF	URU	Carlos de Pena	Nacional	Undisclosed	
1 February 2016	FW	SCO	Jordan Rhodes	Blackburn Rovers	£9,000,000	
1 February 2016	MF	BEL	Julien De Sart	Standard Liège	Undisclosed	

=== Transfers out ===
Date from	Position	Nationality	Name	To	Fee	Ref.
1 July 2015	DF	ENG	David Atkinson	Carlisle United	Free	
1 July 2015	MF	NIR	Ryan Brobbel	Whitby Town	Free	
1 July 2015	DF	ENG	Seb Hines	Orlando City	Free	
1 July 2015	MF	ARG	Emmanuel Ledesma	Rotherham United (Note: Following Ledesma's release he joined Rotherham United.)	Free	
1 July 2015	MF	ENG	James Warnett	Free agent	Released	
1 July 2015	DF	SCO	Kieron Weledji	Whitby Town	Free	
1 July 2015	MF	ENG	Dean Whitehead	Huddersfield Town (Note: Following Whitehead's release he joined Huddersfield Town.)	Free	
2 July 2015	FW	ENG	Luke Williams	Scunthorpe United	Undisclosed	
4 August 2015	MF	ENG	Lee Tomlin	AFC Bournemouth	£3,000,000	
9 January 2016	MF	NED	Yanic Wildschut	Wigan Athletic	Undisclosed	
3 February 2016	FW	SPA	Kike	Eibar	Undisclosed	

=== Loans in ===
Date from	Position	Nationality	Name	From	Until	Ref.
17 July 2015	DF	CZE	Tomáš Kalas	Chelsea	End of season	
27 July 2015	MF	ITA	Diego Fabbrini	Watford	End of season	
31 July 2015	DF	ENG	Jack Stephens	Southampton	End of season	
28 August 2015	DF	VEN	Fernando Amorebieta	Fulham	End of season	
29 August 2015	GK	ITA	Michael Agazzi	Milan	End of season	
26 October 2015	MF	ARG	Bruno Zuculini	Manchester City	26 November 2015	
15 January 2016	FW	SPA	Enrique Sola	Athletic Bilbao	End of season	
26 January 2016	MF	URU	Gastón Ramírez	Southampton	End of season	
1 February 2016	DF	BEL	Ritchie De Laet	Leicester City	End of season	

=== Loans out ===
Date from	Position	Nationality	Name	To	Until	Ref.
31 July 2015	GK	ENG	Connor Ripley	Motherwell	4 January 2016	
3 August 2015	DF	ENG	Jonny Burn	Oldham Athletic	4 January 2016	
6 August 2015	MF	ENG	Bryn Morris	Coventry City	27 October 2015	
27 August 2015	MF	GAM	Mustapha Carayol	Huddersfield Town	End of season	
28 August 2015	DF	ENG	James Husband	Fulham	26 September 2015	
10 September 2015	DF	ENG	Brad Halliday	Hartlepool United	8 October 2015	
14 September 2015	DF	ENG	Adam Jackson	Coventry City	12 October 2015	
26 September 2015	MF	ENG	Adam Reach	Preston North End	28 December 2015	
1 October 2015	MF	NED	Yanic Wildschut	Wigan Athletic	1 January 2016	
20 October 2015	DF	ENG	Brad Halliday	Accrington Stanley	End of season	
27 October 2015	MF	ENG	Bryn Morris	York City	27 November 2015	
4 November 2015	DF	ENG	Adam Jackson	Hartlepool United	One-month	
26 November 2015	FW	ENG	Bradley Fewster	York City	End of season	
26 November 2015	MF	NIR	Jordan Jones	Cambridge United	2 January 2016	
26 November 2015	DF	ENG	Mark Kitching	York City	One-month	
4 January 2016	DF	AUS	Rhys Williams	Charlton Athletic	1 February 2016	
8 January 2016	MF	GAM	Mustapha Carayol	Leeds United	End of season	
8 January 2016	DF	ENG	James Husband	Huddersfield Town	One-month	
28 January 2016	MF	ENG	Bryn Morris	Walsall	Two-month	
26 February 2016	MF	ENG	Harry Chapman	Barnsley	End of season	
1 March 2016	DF	ENG	Alex Baptiste	Sheffield United	2 June 2016	

== Competitions ==
=== Pre-season friendlies ===
On 8 June 2015, Middlesbrough announced two friendlies against York City and Doncaster Rovers. A trip to Barnsley on 29 July was later announced. On 8 July, Boro announced Spanish side Getafe will visit a week prior to the opening game of the season.

11 July 2015 Friendly	York City	0–1	Middlesbrough	York
12:00 BST		Report	Fewster 78'	Stadium: Bootham Crescent; Attendance: 2,798

15 July 2015 Friendly	Middlesbrough	3–1	Leyton Orient	Mijas
17:30 CEST	Adomah 44'; Forshaw 52'; Kike 80'	Report	McCallum 61'	Stadium: La Cala Resort; Attendance: 0

18 July 2015 Friendly	Middlesbrough	1–1	Scunthorpe United	Mijas
17:30 CEST	Leadbitter 84'	Report	Burn 4' (o.g.)	Stadium: La Cala Resort; Attendance: 0

25 July 2015 Friendly	Doncaster Rovers	0–0	Middlesbrough	Doncaster
15:00 BST		Report		Stadium: Keepmoat Stadium; Attendance: 2,831 (726 Boro)

29 July 2015 Friendly	Barnsley	0–4	Middlesbrough	Barnsley
19:00 BST		Report	Kike 47', 73'; Adomah 49', 65'	Stadium: Oakwell; Attendance: 2,082 (328 Boro); Referee: Darren England

1 August 2015 Friendly	Middlesbrough	1–0	Getafe	Middlesbrough
15:00 BST	Kike 55'	Report		Stadium: Riverside Stadium; Attendance: 6,107; Referee: Tony Harrington

=== Championship ===
==== League table ====
Pos	Team	Pld	W	D	L	GF	GA	GD	Pts	Promotion, qualification or relegation
1	Burnley (C, P)	46	26	15	5	72	35	+37	93	Promotion to the Premier League
2	Middlesbrough (P)	46	26	11	9	63	31	+32	89	Promotion to the Premier League
3	Brighton & Hove Albion	46	24	17	5	72	42	+30	89	Qualification for the Championship play-offs (Note: Four teams play for one spot and promotion to the Premier League.)
4	Hull City (O, P)	46	24	11	11	69	35	+34	83	Qualification for the Championship play-offs
5	Derby County	46	21	15	10	66	43	+23	78	Qualification for the Championship play-offs

Source: BBC Sport
Rules for classification: 1) Points; 2) Goal difference; 3) Number of goals scored
(C) Champions; (O) Play-off winners; (P) Promoted

==== League results summary ====
Overall								Home						Away					
Pld	W	D	L	GF	GA	GD	Pts	W	D	L	GF	GA	GD	W	D	L	GF	GA	GD
46	26	11	9	63	31	+32	89	16	5	2	34	8	+26	10	6	7	29	23	+6

Last updated: 7 May 2016.
Source: Football League

==== Matches ====
Round	1	2	3	4	5	6	7	8	9	10	11	12	13	14	15	16	17	18	19	20	21	22	23	24	25	26	27	28	29	30	31	32	33	34	35	36	37	38	39	40	41	42	43	44	45	46
Ground	A	H	A	H	A	H	H	A	H	A	H	A	A	H	H	A	H	A	A	H	H	A	H	H	A	A	H	H	A	A	H	A	A	H	A	A	H	A	H	H	H	A	A	H	A	H
Result	D	W	D	L	W	W	W	W	W	L	D	L	W	W	W	L	W	W	W	D	W	W	W	W	W	L	L	D	D	D	W	W	L	W	L	L	W	W	W	W	W	W	D	D	D	D
Position	16	2	4	8	6	3	2	2	2	2	3	6	4	4	4	4	3	2	1	2	1	1	1	1	1	1	2	2	1	2	3	3	3	1	2	2	2	2	2	2	1	1	1	2	1	2

A = Away; H = Home; W = Win; D = Draw; L = Loss

On 17 June 2015, the fixtures for the forthcoming season were announced.

9 August 2015 1	Preston North End	0–0	Middlesbrough	Preston
12:00 BST		Report		Stadium: Deepdale; Attendance: 15,974; Referee: Chris Kavanagh

15 August 2015 2	Middlesbrough	3–0	Bolton Wanderers	Middlesbrough
15:00 BST	Fabbrini 7'; Kike 17', 32'	Report		Stadium: Riverside Stadium; Attendance: 23,333; Referee: James Adcock

18 August 2015 3	Derby County	1–1	Middlesbrough	Derby
19:45 BST	Russell 88'	Report	Kike 16'	Stadium: Pride Park Stadium; Attendance: 30,855; Referee: Steve Martin

22 August 2015 4	Middlesbrough	0–1	Bristol City	Middlesbrough
15:00 BST		Report	Bryan 8'	Stadium: Riverside Stadium; Attendance: 22,236; Referee: Paul Tierney

29 August 2015 5	Sheffield Wednesday	1–3	Middlesbrough	Sheffield
15:00 BST	Matias 64'	Report	Reach 42'; Fabbrini 67'; Stuani 86'	Stadium: Hillsborough; Attendance: 20,976; Referee: Mark Heywood

12 September 2015 6	Middlesbrough	2–0	Milton Keynes Dons	Middlesbrough
15:00 BST	Downing 70'; Nugent 81'	Report		Stadium: Riverside Stadium; Attendance: 21,448; Referee: Jeremy Simpson

15 September 2015 7	Middlesbrough	3–1	Brentford	Middlesbrough
19:45 BST	Stuani 35', 69'; Adomah 77'	Report	Vibe 49'	Stadium: Riverside Stadium; Attendance: 20,138; Referee: Graham Salisbury

19 September 2015 8	Nottingham Forest	1–2	Middlesbrough	Nottingham
12:30 BST	Mills 7'	Report	Nugent 3'; Ayala 32'	Stadium: City Ground; Attendance: 20,993; Referee: Lee Mason

27 September 2015 9	Middlesbrough	3–0	Leeds United	Middlesbrough
13:15 BST	Nugent 3'; Bellusci 32' (o.g.); Fabbrini 81'	Report		Stadium: Riverside Stadium; Attendance: 27,694; Referee: Neil Swarbrick

3 October 2015 10	Reading	2–0	Middlesbrough	Reading
15:00 BST	Williams 1'; Blackman 88' (pen.)	Report		Stadium: Madejski Stadium; Attendance: 19,516; Referee: Keith Stroud

17 October 2015 11	Middlesbrough	0–0	Fulham	Middlesbrough
15:00 BST		Report		Stadium: Riverside Stadium; Attendance: 22,498; Referee: Peter Bankes

20 October 2015 12	Cardiff City	1–0	Middlesbrough	Cardiff
19:45 BST	Friend 86' (o.g.)	Report		Stadium: Cardiff City Stadium; Attendance: 13,371; Referee: Dean Whitestone

24 October 2015 13	Wolverhampton Wanderers	1–3	Middlesbrough	Wolverhampton
15:00 BST	Edwards 22'	Report	Fabbrini 71'; Leadbitter 82' (pen.); Downing 90+2'	Stadium: Molineux; Attendance: 22,006; Referee: James Linington

31 October 2015 14	Middlesbrough	3–0	Charlton Athletic	Middlesbrough
15:00 BST	Nugent 60'; Adomah 66'; Ayala 78'	Report		Stadium: Riverside Stadium; Attendance: 20,943; Referee: Andrew Madley

3 November 2015 15	Middlesbrough	1–0	Rotherham United	Middlesbrough
19:45 BST	Downing 16'	Report		Stadium: Riverside Stadium; Attendance: 21,144; Referee: Paul Tierney

7 November 2015 16	Hull City	3–0	Middlesbrough	Kingston upon Hull
15:00 BST	Diamé 44'; Clucas 67'; Huddlestone 83'	Report		Stadium: KC Stadium; Attendance: 20,352; Referee: Jeremy Simpson

20 November 2015 17	Middlesbrough	1–0	Queens Park Rangers	Middlesbrough
19:45 BST	Leadbitter 90+4' (pen.)	Report		Stadium: Riverside Stadium; Attendance: 20,299

28 November 2015 18	Huddersfield Town	0–2	Middlesbrough	Huddersfield
15:00 BST		Report	Clayton 9'; Nsue 84'	Stadium: John Smith's Stadium; Attendance: 15,434; Referee: Eddie Ilderton

4 December 2015 19	Ipswich Town	0–2	Middlesbrough	Ipswich
19:45 BST		Report	Stuani 54'; Nugent 74'	Stadium: Portman Road; Attendance: 17,662; Referee: Tim Robinson

12 December 2015 20	Middlesbrough	0–0	Birmingham City	Middlesbrough
15:00 BST		Report		Stadium: Riverside Stadium; Attendance: 20,929; Referee: Darren Bond

15 December 2015 21	Middlesbrough	1–0	Burnley	Middlesbrough
19:45 BST	Nsue 54'	Report		Stadium: Riverside Stadium; Attendance: 19,966; Referee: Geoff Eltringham

19 December 2015 22	Brighton & Hove Albion	0–3	Middlesbrough	Brighton
12:30 GMT		Report	Kike 4'; Adomah 44'; Stuani 62'	Stadium: Falmer Stadium; Attendance: 26,445; Referee: Craig Pawson

28 December 2015 23	Middlesbrough	1–0	Sheffield Wednesday	Middlesbrough
17:15 GMT	Stuani 1'	Report		Stadium: Riverside Stadium; Attendance: 29,363; Referee: David Coote

2 January 2016 24	Middlesbrough	2–0	Derby County	Middlesbrough
15:00 GMT	Adomah 83'; Friend 84'	Report		Stadium: Riverside Stadium; Attendance: 32,870; Referee: Neil Swarbrick

12 January 2016 25	Brentford	0–1	Middlesbrough	Brentford
19:45 GMT	Bidwell (yellow card) 74'	Report	Button 61' (o.g.); Ayala (yellow card) 64'; Stuani (yellow card) 82'; Clayton (yellow card) 90+2'	Stadium: Griffin Park; Attendance: 10,312; Referee: Gavin Ward

16 January 2016 26	Bristol City	1–0	Middlesbrough	Bristol
15:00 GMT	Ayling (yellow card) 56'; Burns (yellow card) 80', (goal) 90+6'	Report	Clayton (yellow card) 62'; Amorebieta (yellow card) 73'	Stadium: Ashton Gate Stadium; Attendance: 15,670; Referee: Carl Boyeson

23 January 2016 27	Middlesbrough	0–1	Nottingham Forest	Middlesbrough
15:00 GMT	Clayton (yellow card) 35'; Amorebieta (yellow card) 59'	Report	Ward (yellow card) 24'; Lichaj (yellow card) 30'; Ward 70'; Jokić (yellow card) 76'	Stadium: Riverside Stadium; Attendance: 24,975; Referee: Fred Graham

6 February 2016 28	Middlesbrough	1–1	Blackburn Rovers	Middlesbrough
15:00 GMT	Kike Sola (yellow card) 18'; Leadbitter (yellow card) 57'; Hanley (yellow card) 64'; Jordi Gómez (yellow card) 74'; Nugent 79'	Report	Marshall (yellow card) 24'; Lenihan (yellow card) 34'; Evans (yellow card) 36'; Gómez 73'	Stadium: Riverside Stadium; Attendance: 26,244; Referee: Dean Whitestone

9 February 2016 29	Milton Keynes Dons	1–1	Middlesbrough	Milton Keynes
19:45 GMT	Bowditch 9'; Forster-Caskey (yellow card) 49'	Report	Nugent (yellow card) 33'; Rhodes 90+3'	Stadium: Stadium mk Attendance: 11,256; Referee: Andy Davies

15 February 2016 30	Leeds United	0–0	Middlesbrough	Leeds
19:45 GMT	Diagouraga (yellow card) 41'; Bellusci (yellow card) 82'	Report	Clayton (yellow card) 25'; Gibson (red card) 89'	Stadium: Elland Road; Attendance: 20,424; Referee: Craig Pawson

23 February 2016 31	Middlesbrough	3–1	Cardiff City	Middlesbrough
19:45 GMT	Connolly 25' (o.g.); Ramírez 63'; Nugent 83'	Report	Fábio 20'	Stadium: Riverside Stadium; Attendance: 24,322; Referee: Trevor Kettle

27 February 2016 32	Fulham	0–2	Middlesbrough	London
15:00 GMT		Report	Adomah 3'; Leadbitter 20' (pen.)	Stadium: Craven Cottage; Attendance: 18,862; Referee: Charles Breakspear

1 March 2016 33	Blackburn Rovers	2–1	Middlesbrough	Blackburn
19:45 GMT	Akpan 47'; Graham 83'	Report	Forshaw 90+1'	Stadium: Ewood Park; Attendance: 16,601; Referee: Andrew Madley

4 March 2016 34	Middlesbrough	2–1	Wolverhampton Wanderers	Middlesbrough
19:45 GMT	Ramírez 24', 56'	Report	Gibson 89' (o.g.)	Stadium: Riverside Stadium; Attendance: 22,110; Referee: Stuart Attwell

8 March 2016 35	Rotherham United	1–0	Middlesbrough	Rotherham
19:45 GMT	Frecklington 88'	Report		Stadium: New York Stadium; Attendance: 10,783; Referee: Peter Bankes

13 March 2016 36	Charlton Athletic	2–0	Middlesbrough	London
15:30 GMT	Teixeira 57'; Harriott 80'	Report		Stadium: The Valley; Attendance: 14,636; Referee: Darren Deadman

18 March 2016 37	Middlesbrough	1–0	Hull City	Middlesbrough
19:45 GMT	Nugent 90+1'	Report		Stadium: Riverside Stadium; Attendance: 26,791; Referee: Andre Marriner

1 April 2016 38	Queens Park Rangers	2–3	Middlesbrough	London
19:45 GMT	Mackie 31'; Chery 86'	Report	Rhodes 18'; Ramírez 51'; Gibson 57'	Stadium: Loftus Road; Attendance: 16,058; Referee: Simon Hooper

5 April 2016 39	Middlesbrough	3–0	Huddersfield Town	Middlesbrough
19:45 GMT	Leadbitter 32' (pen.); Ramírez 33', 77'	Report		Stadium: Riverside Stadium; Attendance: 24,669; Referee: Steve Martin

9 April 2016 40	Middlesbrough	1–0	Preston North End	Middlesbrough
15:00 GMT	Adomah 32'	Report		Stadium: Riverside Stadium; Attendance: 26,390; Referee: Oliver Langford

12 April 2016 41	Middlesbrough	2–1	Reading	Middlesbrough
19:45 GMT	Nsue 10'; Forshaw 90+4'	Report	Cox 54'	Stadium: Riverside Stadium; Attendance: 23,746; Referee: Scott Duncan

16 April 2016 42	Bolton Wanderers	1–2	Middlesbrough	Bolton
15:00 GMT	Vela 61'	Report	Rhodes 73', 90+1'	Stadium: Macron Stadium; Attendance: 18,196; Referee: Keith Stroud

19 April 2016 43	Burnley	1–1	Middlesbrough	Burnley
19:45 GMT	Keane 90+2'	Report	Rhodes 70'	Stadium: Turf Moor; Attendance: 20,197; Referee: Mike Jones

23 April 2016 44	Middlesbrough	0–0	Ipswich Town	Middlesbrough
15:00 GMT		Report		Stadium: Riverside Stadium; Attendance: 30,505; Referee: Darren Bond

29 April 2016 45	Birmingham City	2–2	Middlesbrough	Birmingham
19:45 GMT	Gleeson 33'; Davis 68'	Report	Rhodes 40'; Ramírez 57'	Stadium: St Andrew's; Attendance: 21,380; Referee: Simon Hooper

7 May 2016 46	Middlesbrough	1–1	Brighton & Hove Albion	Middlesbrough
12:30 GMT	Stuani 19'	Report	Konckaert (yellow card) 24'; Stephens 55', (red card) 59'; Wilson (yellow card) 90+5'; Goldson (yellow card) 90+6'	Stadium: Riverside Stadium; Attendance: 33,806; Referee: Mike Dean

=== FA Cup ===
9 January 2016 Third round	Middlesbrough	1–2	Burnley	Middlesbrough
15:00 GMT	Fabbrini 36'	Report	Hennings 7'; Ward 71'	Stadium: Riverside Stadium; Attendance: 18,286; Referee: Simon Hooper

=== League Cup ===
On 16 June 2015, the first round draw was made, Middlesbrough were drawn away against Oldham Athletic. In the second round, Middlesbrough were drawn away to Burton Albion. The third round draw was made on 25 August 2015 live on Sky Sports by Charlie Nicholas and Phil Thompson. Middlesbrough were drawn at home to Wolverhampton Wanderers.

12 August 2015 First round	Oldham Athletic	1–3	Middlesbrough	Oldham
19:45 BST	Philliskirk 90'	Report	Wildschut 23'; Stuani 41', 61'	Stadium: SportsDirect.com Park; Attendance: 4,182; Referee: Carl Boyeson

25 August 2015 Second round	Burton Albion	1–2 (a.e.t.)	Middlesbrough	Burton upon Trent
19:45 BST	Friend 24' (o.g.)	Report	Stuani 70', 109'	Stadium: Pirelli Stadium; Attendance: 3,414; Referee: Mark Brown

22 September 2015 Third round	Middlesbrough	3–0	Wolverhampton Wanderers	Middlesbrough
19:45 BST	Adomah 37', 64'; Fabbrini 57'	Report		Stadium: Riverside Stadium; Attendance: 13,368; Referee: Kevin Wright

28 October 2015 Fourth round	Manchester United	0–0 (a.e.t.) (1–3 p)	Middlesbrough	Manchester
20:00 GMT		Report		Stadium: Old Trafford; Attendance: 67,258; Referee: Lee Mason
	Penalties
	Rooney (penalty missed); Pereira (penalty scored); Carrick (penalty missed); Young (penalty missed)		Leadbitter (penalty scored); Nugent (penalty missed); Downing (penalty scored); Gibson (penalty scored)

1 December 2015 Fifth round	Middlesbrough	0–2	Everton	Middlesbrough
19:45 GMT		Report	Deulofeu 20'; Lukaku 28'	Stadium: Riverside Stadium; Attendance: 31,628; Referee: Roger East
