= 2013–14 Brentford F.C. season =

English football team season

Brentford F.C.
2013–14 season
- Owner: Matthew Benham
- Chairman: Cliff Crown
- Manager: Uwe Rösler (until 7 December 2013); Mark Warburton (from 10 December 2013)
- League One: 2nd (promoted)
- FA Cup: Second round
- League Cup: Second round
- Football League Trophy: Second round
- Top goalscorer: League: Clayton Donaldson (17); All: Clayton Donaldson (18)
- Highest home attendance: 11,393 (3 May 2014 v Stevenage)
- Lowest home attendance: 5,705 (19 October 2013 v Colchester United)
- Average home league attendance: 7,715
Home colours	Away colours

The 2013–14 season saw Brentford return to the Championship after a 21-year absence, securing promotion from League One with three games of the season remaining and breaking their league points record.

== Season review ==
=== Pre-season ===
Brentford began their pre-season with an intensive training tour in Germany. Matches against Einheit Rudolstadt and FC Rot-Weiß Erfurt saw all available players get a run out, along with triallists Martin Fillo (FC Viktoria Plzeň), Daniel Müller (ex-Bayern Munich II) and assistant manager Alan Kernaghan. The domestic matches began with a home win against Millwall and a defeat to Scottish Premiership champions Celtic. Conference South opposition Boreham Wood gave Rösler the opportunity to test some of the development squad players along with new and existing squad members, before an exciting final game saw Brentford come from behind to beat Premier League side Cardiff City 3–2 at Griffin Park.

=== August ===
The opening game of the 2013–14 season saw Shaleum Logan score a 22-yard goal as Brentford drew 1–1 with newly promoted Port Vale. Three days later a team which saw ten starting line-up changes emerged 3–2 winners over Dagenham & Redbridge in the League Cup, with a brace from Farid El Alagui on his first competitive start in 10 months. In the subsequent second round draw, Brentford were drawn away to Derby County. The first League One home game of the season ended in a 3–1 victory over Sheffield United leaving Brentford 7th in the table. Adam Forshaw opened the scoring with a shot from outside the penalty area, which was followed by two second-half goals from Will Grigg. Grigg had the opportunity to claim a hat trick on his home debut, but his 79th minute penalty was saved. The next game at Gillingham saw ex-Bees Leon Legge, Myles Weston and Stuart Nelson hold Brentford to a 1–1 draw under the guidance of ex-manager Martin Allen. Substitute El Alagui rifled home Harlee Dean's headed pass to score his third goal in three appearances.

Everton loanee Conor McAleny was stretchered off after 5 minutes during the home league game against Walsall which forced a reshuffle of Brentford's formation. Clayton Donaldson scored his first goal of the season, heading in from Shaleum Logan's cross extending Brentford's 100% home record. In the second round of the League Cup, Championship side Derby County put five goals past another vastly changed Brentford side without reply. Development squad member Josh Clarke was handed his first team debut, with colleague Alfie Mawson also making his debut as a second-half substitute. Brentford finished the month with a 0–0 draw at home to Carlisle United in a game which saw captain Tony Craig receive a straight red card after bringing down goal bound David Amoo in the second half. Brentford, with the bulk of the possession, had a vast array of shots and Toumani Diagouraga did find the back of the net, but the goal was not given due to jostling in the goal area.

Adam Forshaw's goal against Sheffield United was voted Brentford's Goal of the Month for August.

=== September ===
Transfer deadline day saw the return of Marcello Trotta to the club on loan from Fulham and the signing of Raphaël Calvet from French side AJ Auxerre. The first round of the Football League Trophy saw Brentford's first competitive game against AFC Wimbledon. A first half goal from El Alagui left the score at 1–0 at the break. He added another in the second half and along with goals from Luke Norris, Ben Nugent and Javi Venta (all scoring their first goals for the club) the team had a 5–1 lead after 69 minutes. AFC Wimbledon attempted a late comeback clawing back two goals, but it was Brentford who progressed to the second round with a 5–3 victory. Against Bradford City at Valley Parade, David Button brought down Nahki Wells on the edge of the penalty area in the 26th minute of the game and received a straight red card. Substitute goalkeeper Jack Bonham was immediately brought on to make his League debut for the club, but Bradford capitalised on the advantage and finished 4–0 winners.

Martin Taylor and João Carlos Teixeira joined the club as the loan window opened, the latter having been a target for Serie A side Bologna. For the Tranmere Rovers game Richard Lee returned to the Brentford goal after injury and replaced David Button who was suspended after his sending off against Bradford City. Brentford started strong and scored twice in the first 15 minutes through Martin Taylor and Clayton Donaldson (Taylor's goal believed to be the fastest goal scored by a debutant for Brentford in the league). Tranmere got a goal back just before halftime and came out dominant in the second half with Adam Dugdale scoring to level the game. Donaldson added another for Brentford before Tranmere again equalised in the 90th minute with a strike from substitute Cole Stockton. The game looked to be heading for a draw until Dugdale handled in the area to concede a penalty which Adam Forshaw converted to give Brentford their first away win. Teixeira came on as a second-half substitute for George Saville to make his league debut.

In a televised match Leyton Orient arrived at Griffin Park with a 100% league record and left with their record intact. Shaleum Logan brought down Dave Mooney in the second half and the striker stepped up to convert the penalty. Orient substitute Shaun Batt then added a second with his first touch of the match on the 85th minute. A crowd of just over 2,600 watched Brentford win 2–0 against Coventry City at their temporary home, Sixfields Stadium. Clayton Donaldson grabbed the first goal, flicking over the keeper after Cyrus Christie missed his clearance, and Martin Taylor confirmed the win, heading in a cross from Sam Saunders in the second half, leaving Brentford in 10th place at the end of the month.

=== October ===
October started with a home defeat to Rotherham United. David Button returned in goal following suspension but couldn't prevent an early goal from Mark Bradley settling the match. Brentford bowed out of the Football League Trophy with a defeat away to Peterborough United. An early own goal from Martin Taylor gave the home side the lead, and the lead was doubled in the second half when debutant Raphaël Calvet brought down Nathaniel Mendez-Laing in the box and the resulting penalty was converted by Grant McCann. Ben Nugent scored a late consolation goal but it wasn't enough to stop Brentford exiting the competition.

Brentford slumped to their 4th league defeat of the season following a 2–1 defeat at Stevenage which saw Jonathan Douglas return to the team after injury. Donaldson put Brentford ahead in the 13th minute to score his 5th of the campaign, but Stevenage responded swiftly through François Zoko. Zoko doubled his tally 11 minutes later which was enough to secure victory for the Boro and leave the Bees 11th place in the table. After going a goal down against Colchester United a third straight league defeat seemed to be on the cards before three goals in eleven minutes turned the game. Marcello Trotta levelled the score in the 76th minute before George Saville netted his first league goal to put the Bees ahead. Kadeem Harris scored the third goal on his club debut following his loan from Cardiff City, and guaranteed the points and the win.

The next game away to Bristol City saw Richard Lee return to the starting line up in goal for Brentford. City started strong and had the better of the first half, but the second half introduction of Sam Saunders for Kadeem Harris changed the game for the visitors as he became both scorer and provider. Saunders' 79th minute shot was deflected past the City keeper to put the Bees ahead and seven minutes later Clayton Donaldson was on hand to volley in a corner from the substitute. Marlon Harewood scored an injury-time consolation goal but was unable to prevent the extension of City's winless streak to 21 games. A crowd of 9,783 descended on Griffin Park to watch Brentford beat Shrewsbury Town and move up to 5th place in the league table. Marcello Trotta volleyed home the only goal of the game in the 18th minute giving the team their third win in eight days.

=== November ===
Brentford began November with an away win at Crawley Town. Kyle McFadzean tripped Kadeem Harris in the Crawley box to concede a penalty which Adam Forshaw converted to score his third goal of the season. Ex-Bee Marcus Gayle's Staines Town were Brentford's opponents in the first round of the 2013–14 FA Cup. Ben Nugent started in place of the suspended Harlee Dean and goals from Alan McCormack, Jake Reeves, Kadeem Harris, Marcello Trotta and Clayton Donaldson sealed a 5–0 win for the Bees. Crewe Alexandra were the next visitors to Griffin Park and they departed on the wrong end of another 5–0 scoreline. Crewe defended well until the deadlock was broken on the 43rd minute by Marcello Trotta with a long range header. Brentford came out for the second half strong and immediately added a second through Forshaw. George Saville increased the lead in the 58th minute before Donaldson netted twice bringing his league goal tally to eight.

February 1993 was the last time that Brentford had visited Molineux and it was the venue for the Bees 17th league fixture of the season. The 0–0 scoreline was a fair reflection of the solid defensive displays by both sides, and although Wolves had the greater possession, Brentford notched up more on-target shots and remained 4th in the league table. Brentford's unbeaten run continued three days later with a 3–2 victory over Peterborough United. An early own goal from Gabriel Zakuani gave the Bees a one nil lead at the break, but Peterborough came back and gained the lead with goals from Jack Payne and Britt Assombalonga in the 59th and 60th minutes. The visitors defended their lead well until a reshuffle of the Brentford team led to an equaliser from George Saville (later attributed to Will Grigg), with the comeback completed in the 87th minute via Donaldson.

Two changes were made to the unbeaten starting eleven for the visit to Notts County with Toumani Diagouraga coming in for Saville in midfield and Will Grigg replacing Trotta up front. County had the better of the first half until Grigg fired home in the 44th minute and Brentford held on to the lead to secure their seventh win in the last eight league matches.

=== December ===
Striker Paul Hayes departed after 16 months with the club, his contract being terminated by mutual agreement Off the field, Hounslow Council approved the club's application for a new 20,000 seater stadium and community facility at Lionel Road, due to open in time for the start of the 2016/17 season. Uwe Rösler was named the League One Manager of the Month for November after guiding the team to 13 points out of a possible 15 as it was announced that the club had 'reluctantly' agreed to give the manager permission to talk to Wigan Athletic about their vacant managerial position.

It was announced shortly before the FA Cup 2nd Round match at Carlisle United that Rösler had left the club to take up the role at Wigan with Assistant Manager Alan Kernaghan, First Team Coach Peter Farrell and Sporting Director Mark Warburton taking over the team in the interim. The temporary management team were unable to extend the team's unbeaten run as they were beaten 2–3 and exited the cup competition. After going a goal down before the break an own goal from Pascal Chimbonda levelled the score, but two goals from Lee Miller put the home team ahead. A late consolation from Farid El Alagui gave the Bees some hope but Carlisle defended well in the closing minutes to protect their win. Mark Warburton was announced as the new manager on 10 December, initially until the end of the season. His career got off to a good start with a home win against Oldham Athletic. Jonathan Douglas headed a late winner for the Bees to score his first of the season. Alan Kernaghan and Peter Farrell departed the club to join Rösler at Wigan while ex-Sheffield United manager David Weir was announced as Brentford's new Assistant Manager.

Clayton Donaldson was brought down by goalkeeper Declan Rudd in the 22nd minute against Preston North End and the resulting penalty was converted by Adam Forshaw. Marcello Trotta added a second three minutes later, while substitute Sam Saunders chested down and volleyed home in the second half to guarantee the win. Brentford briefly held first place in the league table following their 3–2 win over Swindon Town in an early match on Boxing Day before wins from both Wolves and Leyton Orient restored the table to the order at the start of the day. The team came back from behind twice with Trotta scoring the winner in the 77th minute.

The final game of 2013 saw the Bees entertain MK Dons at Griffin Park on 29 December. Clayton Donaldson opened the scoring in the 2nd minute and the lead was extended soon after half time with goals from Trotta and Saunders. Ex-Bee Lee Hodson grabbed a goal back for MK but the home team held on for the win, and with Wolves and Leyton Orient drawing against each other Brentford leapfrogged them both to end 2013 on top of League One.

=== January ===
Adam Forshaw scored one penalty and missed another, Sam Saunders scored for the fourth consecutive match and Clayton Donaldson grabbed his twelfth league goal of the season as Brentford beat Peterborough on New Year's Day. The result extended Brentford's unbeaten run to 13 games, which included 12 victories. The run was extended with a home win against Port Vale on 11 January and Brentford broke a club record by winning 8 league games in row for the first time. The absence of Forshaw, Dean and Douglas saw Shaleum Logan, Kevin O'Connor and new signing Alan Judge drafted into the side and Marcello Trotta opened the scoring on thirty minutes with a strike from 25 yards. Brentford came out strong in the second half but Vale could not be broken until the 88th minute when substitute Will Grigg netted his 5th of the season. The eight match winning streak came to an end with a hard-fought draw against Walsall which gave Leyton Orient the chance to leapfrog the team and claim the top spot in League One. Donaldson headed home in the thirtieth minute meeting a Jake Bidwell cross but Craig Westcarr equalised on the stroke of half time to level the score.

Gillingham were the opponents at Griffin Park for the televised match on a wet and windy Friday night on 24 January. Jonathan Douglas put the home side ahead on the 22nd minute with a perfectly timed run to meet a Jake Bidwell cross. In the second half Tony Craig was brought down in the Gillingham box, and with regular penalty taker Adam Forshaw injured Marcello Trotta stepped up to put the demons of last season behind him and converted to put the Bees 2–0 up. Gillingham replied 3 minutes later and increased the pressure for the remainder of the game, but Brentford held on for the win. The following Tuesday Brentford were at home again, this time to Bristol City. The Bees went ahead early on when a Bidwell cross was sliced into his own net by Aden Flint, but ex-Bee Karleigh Osborne fired home an equaliser three minutes later to level the score. City continued to pile on the pressure until a shot from Alan Judge found its way into the net to put the home side ahead once more. Judge was also involved in what was to be the winning goal when he slotted a pass through the City defence to Marcello Trotta who scored his ninth league goal of the season and extended Brentford's unbeaten streak to 17 league games.

=== February ===
The unbeaten streak continued into February with a 1–1 draw away to Shrewsbury. With a strong wind affecting play the first half finished goalless but the Bees used the advantage of the wind behind them in the second half to increase the pressure on the Shrews. Marcello Trotta was brought down in the box and stepped up to take the resulting penalty. Shrewsbury goalkeeper Chris Weale was able to get a hand to the shot, only to see Trotta follow up and fire home. Brentford pushed for a second, but in the final minutes a break by Shrewsbury saw Tom Eaves level the score. The home match against Crawley Town and the away fixture against Sheffield United were both postponed due to waterlogged pitches, but Brentford remained top of the league as Leyton Orient lost both their corresponding games and Wolves also suffered a postponement. Three powerful strikes saw off Crewe at Alexandra Stadium. Alan Judge netted two, one in each half, and Adam Forshaw added the third in front of a crowd of just under 5,000.

Promotion rivals Wolverhampton Wanderers arrived at Griffin Park on 22 February to partake in a six-pointer as first played second. Despite starting the game strong, Brentford conceded late in the first half with the visitors capitalising with a brace in the second, bringing to an end the Bees 19 game unbeaten run and moving them down two places to third in the league table.

=== March ===
Injuries to first choice defenders Harlee Dean and Alan McCormack saw Nico Yennaris and débutante James Tarkowski start as Brentford travelled to Carlisle. The match, in which both teams had good chances to score, ended in a 0–0 draw leaving Brentford in third position as Leyton Orient and Wolves both won. After a quiet first half against Bradford, Clayton Donaldson fired home from outside the box to put the home team ahead. George Saville added a second to hand the Bees a 2–0 win. Three days later Brentford entertained Tranmere at Griffin Park. James Tarkowski scored his first goal for the club with a powerful second half header before Donaldson wrapped up the win twelve minutes later. The match against early league leaders and promotion rivals Leyton Orient was an early kick off to accommodate the live TV broadcast. Marcello Trotta netted in first half injury time what turned out to be the only goal of the match, and 10-man Brentford held on for the win following the sending off of James Tarkowski early in the second half, moving the team up to 2nd place in the league.

Brentford recorded their fourth straight win against Coventry at home on 22 March. Callum Wilson put the visitors ahead following a spilled save by David Button, but Donaldson and Trotta both scored to leave the Bees ahead at the break after Alan Judge had missed a penalty. Alan McCormack scored his first league goal for the club with a powerful run and a deft chip over the Coventry goalkeeper. Alan Judge conceded a penalty early into the away game at in-form Rotherham which was converted by Kieran Agard. Agard added a second before half time, and Haris Vuckic confirmed defeat for the Bees in the final minute of the match. Brentford finished the month with a goalless away draw to Oldham.

=== April ===
April began with a midweek trip away to Sheffield United. Marcello Trotta was brought down in the Blades box by Kieron Freeman and referee Eddie Ilderton immediately pointed to the penalty spot and showed a red card to the defender. However following consultation with his assistant Ilderton waved Freeman back on the pitch and rescinded the penalty decision, instead awarding a dropball. The match finished goalless and resulting point helped the Bees hold on to second position in the league table Four days later at Griffin Park visitors Notts County were reduced to 10 men soon after the 30 minute mark when Haydn Hollis brought down Clayton Donaldson in the penalty box. Adam Forshaw slotted home the penalty and Alan Judge scored either side of the break to put the Bees 3–0 up. Ex-Brentford loanee Jimmy Spencer grabbed a consolation goal for the visitors, but Brentford gained their first win in four matches.

Brentford recorded their highest points tally in the league history (87 points) as Jonathan Douglas headed the only goal in the home victory against Crawley. The following fixture away to Swindon saw David Button save a first half penalty when Alan McCormack was adjudged to have brought down Alex Pritchard in the Brentford box. Just before the break Douglas was dispossessed on the edge of the Brentford area by Louis Thompson who slotted home to score what would be the only goal of the match.

With four matches of the season remaining Brentford could mathematically secure promotion if they won against Preston, Leyton Orient lost to Crawley and Rotherham either drew or lost to Wolves. Brentford started well with Alan Judge converting a penalty after George Saville was brought down. A second penalty awarded in the second half was scuffed by Judge as he slipped during his run up, but despite a late surge from Preston, Brentford held on for the win. As word spread around Griffin Park that Orient had lost and Rotherham were losing, fans flooded onto the pitch to celebrate, but a late comeback from Rotherham prevented confirmation of the promotion. Brentford's 21-year wait to return to the 2nd tier was confirmed a few minutes later as Wolves scored two late goals to beat Rotherham 6–4.

Brentford's quest to claim the league title came to an end with a late equaliser from Izale McLeod in the game against MK Dons. James Tarkowski had put Brentford ahead before the break and Clayton Donaldson grabbed his 17th league goal of the season in the 59th minute. MK got back into the game through a Stephen Gleeson penalty and McLeod netted a last minute equaliser to hand the League One title to Wolves. The team suffered a promotion hangover with a 4–1 defeat at Colchester on 26 April After going three goals down, Stuart Dallas grabbed one back for the Bees, before Freddie Sears restored the three goal advantage.

=== May ===
The season finale at home to already relegated Stevenage saw Brentford emerge as 2–0 winners with goals from Stuart Dallas and Alan Judge. Kevin O'Connor came on as a substitute for Tony Craig in the 26th minute to make his 500th appearance for the club. A season highest attendance of 11,393 stayed behind after the final whistle to see the team presented with a trophy for finishing runners up in League One.

== Season events ==
- 12 June: Jack Bonham signs a 2-year deal to join from Watford. Sam Saunders extends his contract, signing a 2-year deal keeping him at the club until 2015
- 17 June: Jake Bidwell signs a permanent 3-year contract following a successful loan period from Everton
- 24 June: Alan McCormack joins on a 2-year contract from Swindon Town. 20-year-old George Saville joins on loan from Chelsea until 5 January 2014
- 27 June: Antonio German leaves the club, signing for Gillingham. Adam Forshaw extends his contract with the club until 2016
- 1 July Will Grigg signs from Walsall on a 3-year deal
- 3 July Doncaster Rovers confirm the signing of Harry Forrester
- 11 July Javi Venta joins the club from Villarreal on a 1-year contract
- 12 July Martin Fillo signs a season long loan from FC Viktoria Plzeň
- 16 July Harlee Dean extends his contract until 2016
- 26 July Conor McAleny joins on loan until 6 January 2014 from Everton
- 30 July Simon Moore is sold to Cardiff City for an undisclosed fee. Brentford sign David Button from Charlton Athletic on a 2-year contract
- 1 August Ben Nugent arrives on loan from Cardiff until 5 January
- 8 August Brentford draw Derby County away in the second round of the League Cup
- 9 August Emmanuel Oyeleke is loaned out to Aldershot FC until December
- 15 August Goalkeeper Liam O'Brien signs on a short term deal
- 17 August Brentford are drawn at home to AFC Wimbledon in the 1st round of the League Trophy
- 24 August Conor McAleny suffers a broken leg and is expected to be out for most of the season
- 27 August Brentford go out of the League Cup losing 5–0 to Derby County
- 2 September Brentford sign Marcello Trotta on loan from Fulham until January 2014. Raphaël Calvet is signed from AJ Auxerre on a 3-year deal Conor McAleny's loan is ended following confirmation of a broken leg
- 4 September Brentford progress to the second round of the League Trophy beating AFC Wimbledon 5–3
- 10 September Martin Taylor joins on a one-month loan from Sheffield Wednesday. Liverpool Midfielder João Carlos Teixeira joins on a Youth loan until January 2014.
- 30 September Javi Venta leaves the club, moving back to Spain for family reasons.
- 4 October Alfie Mawson joins Maidenhead United on loan. Striker Paul Hayes joins Plymouth Argyle on a month's loan.
- 5 October Stuart Dallas joins Northampton Town on loan.
- 7 October Martin Taylor's loan is extended by a month
- 8 October Loanee João Carlos Teixeira returns to Liverpool Brentford exit the Football League Trophy away to Peterborough United.
- 18 October Kadeem Harris signs on loan from Cardiff City until 5 January 2014. Luke Norris is loaned out to Northampton Town until 16 November
- 26 October A crowd of 9,783 watch the game between Brentford and Shrewsbury Town in a 'Pay What You Can' promotion
- 27 October Brentford are drawn at home in the 1st round of the FA Cup to either Staines Town or Poole Town
- 4 November Paul Hayes returns from his loan at Plymouth Argyle. Martin Taylor returns to Sheffield Wednesday.
- 5 November Stuart Dallas' loan at Northampton Town is extended until 1 January.
- 13 November Stuart Dallas extends his contract with the Bees until 2016
- 15 November Liam O'Brien extends his short term contract until January 2014. Jack Bonham signs on loan for Arlesey Town until January 2014
- 18 November Luke Norris extends his loan at Northampton Town until 4 January 2014.
- 28 November Aaron Pierre joins Cambridge United until January 2014. Alfie Mawson is recalled from his loan at Maidenhead United to join Luton Town until January 2014. Joe Maloney is loaned to Burnham until January.
- 3 December Paul Hayes leaves the club by mutual consent
- 4 December Josh Clarke joins Maidenhead United until January 2014
- 5 December A planning application for new 20,000 stadium in Lionel Road is approved. Uwe Rösler named League One Manager of the Month for November. Rösler given permission to talk to Wigan Athletic
- 7 December Uwe Rösler's departure to Wigan is confirmed. Brentford go out of the FA Cup in the second round.
- 10 December Mark Warburton appointed manager 'at least until the end of the current season'.
- 16 December Alan Kernaghan and Peter Farrell leave and David Weir joins as Assistant Manager.
- 22 December Emmanuel Oyeleke had his loan at Aldershot Town extended until 28 January.
- 23 December Stuart Dallas is recalled early from his loan.
- 31 December Jack Bonham's loan at Arlesey Town is extended until the end of the season.
- 3 January Luke Norris returns from Northampton Town.
- 6 January Ben Nugent returns to Cardiff City. Aaron Pierre returns from Cambridge United. Josh Clarke returns from Maidenhead United.
- 7 January Marcello Trotta and George extend their loan deals until the end of the season.
- 8 January Attacking midfielder Alan Judge joins on loan until the end of the season from Blackburn Rovers. Farid El Alagui joins Dundee United on loan until the end of the season.
- 9 January Chuba Akpom signs on loan from Arsenal until 9 February. Joe Maloney's loaned at Burnham is extended until the end of the season.
- 10 January Alfie Mawson returns from his loan and Luton Town. Manager Mark Warburton wins League One Manager of the Month for December. Sam Saunders wins Player of the Month for December in League One.
- 14 January Liam O'Brien has his contract extended until 14 May.
- 23 January Luke Norris signs on loan for Dagenham & Redbridge on loan until 23 February.
- 27 January Nico Yennaris signs from Arsenal for an undisclosed fee until 2016.
- 30 January Shaleum Logan joins Aberdeen on loan for the rest of the season. Emmanuel Oyeleke returns after his loan at Aldershot.
- 31 January Central Defender James Tarkowski signs from Oldham until 2017. Alfie Mawson joins Welling United until the end of the season.
- 6 February Ex-Manchester City Academy player Louis Hutton signs a Development Squad contract until 2015.
- 8 February Jack Bonham returns from his loan at Arlesey Town.
- 10 February Loanee Chuba Akpom returns to Arsenal.
- 11 February Charlie Adams joins Barnet on a youth loan until the end of the season.
- 13 February Richard Lee extends his contract until 2015.
- 17 February Toumani Diagouraga joins League Two side Portsmouth on loan for one month. Josh Clarke joins Braintree on a Youth Loan until 12 March.
- 21 February Tyrell Miller-Rodney joins Maidenhead on loan until 23 March.
- 24 February Luke Norris extends his loan at Dagenham & Redbridge until 23 March.
- 28 February Matthew Benham acquires a 100% shareholding of the club. Development Squad member Aaron Pierre joins Wycombe on loan until 30 March.
- 10 March Charlie Adams is recalled from his loan at Barnet. Youth Team player Lewis Lavender joins Burnham on loan.
- 14 March The Lionel Road application is confirmed by the Parliamentary Under Secretary of State for Planning.
- 16 March Adam Forshaw is named League One Player of the Year.
- 17 March Toumani Diagouraga's loan at Portsmouth is extended until the end of the season.
- 20 March Charlie Adams is promoted to the First Team with a contract upgrade. Kevin O'Connor signs a new one-year contract until the summer of 2015.
- 24 March Luke Norris extends his loan at Dagenham & Redbridge until the end of the season.
- 26 March Toumani Diagouraga is recalled from his loan at Portsmouth.
- 27 March Tyrell Miller-Rodney returns from loan at Maidenhead. Emmanuel Oyeleke returns to Aldershot on loan until the end of the season.
- 31 March Aaron Pierre extends his loan at Wycombe until the end of the season.
- 16 April Josh Clarke is promoted from the Development Squad to the First Team.
- 1 May Emmanuel Oyeleke, Alfie Mawson, Joe Taylor, Lewis Lavender & George Pilbeam return from their non-League loans.
- 5 May Alan McCormack is named Supporters' Player of the Year, Tony Craig wins Players' Player of the Year and Bees Travel Club Player of the Year, Adam Forshaw claims Goal Of The Season, Marcello Trotta wins Bees Player Moment Of The Season for his goal against Leyton Orient and Clayton Donaldson and Kevin O'Connor were joint winners of the Community Player of the Year award. Kevin O'Connor also receives a special presentation to commemorate 500 appearances for the club.'
- 7 May Luke Norris and Aaron Pierre return from their respective loans at Dagenham & Redbridge and Wycombe.
- 10 May Adam Forshaw is named Junior Bees Player of the Year.
- 13 May Shaleum Logan's loan at Aberdeen end.
- 16 May Aaron Pierre turns down a Development Squad contract and joins Wycombe Wanderers.
- 17 May Farid El Alagui's loan at Dundee United ends.
- 27 May Scott Barron, Farid El Alagui, Shaleum Logan and Liam O'Brien are released by the club.

== Preseason ==
=== German Training Camp Friendlies ===
Win Draw Loss Postponed

2 July 2013	Einheit Rudolstadt	0–3	Brentford
18:30		Reports; BFC	Donaldson 25'; Saville 84'; Hayes 85'	Attendance: 200

6 July 2013	Rot-Weiß Erfurt	1–1	Brentford
13:00	Tunjić 42'	Reports; BFC	Dean 20'	Attendance: 682

=== Domestic Friendlies ===
16 July 2013	Brentford	3–0	Millwall	Griffin Park
19:45	Saunders 46'; Hayes 59'; Dallas 88'	Reports; BFC		Attendance: 2,039

20 July 2013	Brentford	1–2	Celtic	Griffin Park
15:00	Forshaw 11'	Reports; BFC	Baldé 23'; McGregor 58'	Attendance: 8,253

23 July 2013	Boreham Wood	1–3	Brentford	Meadow Park
19:30	Willock 16'	Reports; BFC	Dallas 42', 55', 85'

30 July 2013	Brentford	3–2	Cardiff	Griffin Park
19:45	McAleny 44'; McAleny 47'; Hayes 88'	Reports; BBC; BFC; Highlights on YouTube	Bo-Kyung 12'; Campbell 14'	Attendance: 2,954

== League One ==
=== League results summary ===
Overall								Home						Away					
Pld	W	D	L	GF	GA	GD	Pts	W	D	L	GF	GA	GD	W	D	L	GF	GA	GD
46	28	10	8	72	43	+29	94	19	1	3	44	17	+27	9	9	5	28	26	+2

Source: Statto

=== Results and position by round ===
Round	1	2	3	4	5	6	7	8	9	10	11	12	13	14	15	16	17	18	19	20	21	22	23	24	25	26	27	28	29	30	31	32	33	34	35	36	37	38	39	40	41	42	43	44	45	46
Ground	A	H	A	H	H	A	A	H	A	H	A	H	A	H	A	H	A	H	A	H	A	H	H	A	H	A	H	H	A	A	H	A	H	H	A	H	A	A	A	H	H	A	H	A	A	H
Result	D	W	D	W	D	L	W	L	W	L	L	W	W	W	W	W	D	W	W	W	W	W	W	W	W	D	W	W	D	W	L	D	W	W	W	W	L	D	D	W	W	L	W	D	L	W
Position	12	7	6	4	4	8	8	10	10	10	11	11	7	5	5	4	4	4	4	3	3	3	1	1	1	2	1	1	1	1	3	3	3	3	2	2	2	2	2	2	2	2	2	2	2	2

Source: Statto
A = Away; H = Home; W = Win; D = Draw; L = Loss

=== League table ===
Pos	Team	Pld	W	D	L	GF	GA	GD	Pts	Promotion, qualification or relegation
1	Wolverhampton Wanderers (C, P)	46	31	10	5	89	31	+58	103	Promotion to Football League Championship
2	Brentford (P)	46	28	10	8	72	43	+29	94	Promotion to Football League Championship
3	Leyton Orient	46	25	11	10	85	45	+40	86	Qualification for League One play-offs (Note: Four teams play for one spot and promotion to Football League Championship.)
4	Rotherham United (O, P)	46	24	14	8	86	58	+28	86	Qualification for League One play-offs
5	Preston North End	46	23	16	7	72	46	+26	85	Qualification for League One play-offs

Updated to match(es) played on 3 May 2014. Source: BBC Sport
Rules for classification: 1) Points; 2) Goal difference; 3) Number of goals scored
(C) Champions; (O) Play-off winners; (P) Promoted

=== Matches ===
Win Draw Loss Postponed

==== August ====
3 August 2013 1	Port Vale	1–1	Brentford	Vale Park
15:00	Loft 30'	Reports; BBC; BFC; PVFC; Highlights on YouTube	Logan 26'	Attendance: 7,579

10 August 2013 2	Brentford	3–1	Sheffield United	Griffin Park
15:00	Forshaw 35'; Grigg 63', 76'	Reports; BBC; BFC; SUFC; Highlights on YouTube	Collins 57'	Attendance: 7,316; Referee: Woolmer

17 August 2013 3	Gillingham	1–1	Brentford	Priestfield Stadium
15:00	Akinfenwa 40'	Reports; BBC; BFC; GFC; Highlights on YouTube	El Alagui 90+4'	Attendance: 6,225; Referee: Rushton

24 August 2013 4	Brentford	1–0	Walsall	Griffin Park
15:00	Donaldson 42'	Reports; BBC; BFC; WFC; Highlights on YouTube		Attendance: 5,781; Referee: Hayward

31 August 2013 5	Brentford	0–0	Carlisle United	Griffin Park
15:00	Craig (red card) 65'	Reports; BBC; BFC; CUFC; Highlights on YouTube		Attendance: 6,035; Referee: Phillips

==== September ====
7 September 2013 6	Bradford City	4–0	Brentford	Valley Parade
15:00	Hanson 41', 69'; Wells 60'; Thompson 64'	Reports; BBC; BFC; BCAFC; Highlights on YouTube	Button (red card) 26'	Attendance: 13,621; Referee: Haines

14 September 2013 7	Tranmere Rovers	3–4	Brentford	Prenton Park
15:00	Atkinson 44'; Dugdale 55'; Stockton 90'	Reports; BBC; BFC; TRFC; Highlights on YouTube	Taylor 2'; Donaldson 14', 71'; Forshaw 90+2' (pen.)	Attendance: 4,454; Referee: Duncan

23 September 2013 8	Brentford	0–2	Leyton Orient	Griffin Park
19:45		Reports; BBC; BFC; LOFC; Highlights on YouTube	Mooney 65' (pen.); Batt 85'	Attendance: 6,439; Referee: Linington

29 September 2013 9	Coventry City	0–2	Brentford	Sixfields Stadium
15:00		Reports; BBC; BFC; CCFC; Highlights on YouTube	Donaldson 22'; Taylor 68'	Attendance: 2,650; Referee: Salisbury

==== October ====
5 October 2013 10	Brentford	0–1	Rotherham United	Griffin Park
15:00		Reports; BBC; BFC; RUFC; Highlights on YouTube	Bradley 14'	Attendance: 6,614; Referee: Langford

12 October 2013 11	Stevenage	2–1	Brentford	Broadhall Way
15:00	Zoko 15', 26'	Reports; BBC; BFC; Highlights on YouTube	Donaldson 13'	Attendance: 3,225; Referee: Sarginson

19 October 2013 12	Brentford	3–1	Colchester United	Griffin Park
15:00	Trotta 76'; Saville 80'; Harris 87'	Reports; BBC; BFC; CUFC; Highlights on YouTube	Okuonghae 49'	Attendance: 5,705; Referee: Malone

22 October 2013 13	Bristol City	1–2	Brentford	Ashton Gate
19:45	Harewood 90+2'	Reports; BBC; BFC; Highlights on YouTube	Saunders 79'; Donaldson 86'	Attendance: 10,639; Referee: Gibbs

26 October 2013 14	Brentford	1–0	Shrewsbury Town	Griffin Park
15:00	Trotta 18'	Reports; BBC; BFC; STFC; Highlights on YouTube		Attendance: 9,783; Referee: Stroud

==== November ====
2 November 2013 15	Crawley Town	0–1	Brentford	Broadfield Stadium
15:00		Reports; BBC; BFC; CTFC; Highlights on YouTube	Forshaw 5' (pen.)	Attendance: 4,177; Referee: Scott

16 November 2013 16	Brentford	5–0	Crewe Alexandra	Griffin Park
15:00	Trotta 43'; Forshaw 46'; Saville 58'; Donaldson 63', 73'	Reports; BBC; BFC; CAFC; Highlights on YouTube		Attendance: 6,616; Referee: Bull

23 November 2013 17	Wolverhampton Wanderers	0–0	Brentford	Molineux
15:00		Reports; BBC; BFC; WWFC; Highlights on YouTube		Attendance: 19,061; Referee: Naylor

26 November 2013 18	Brentford	3–2	Peterborough United	Griffin Park
19:45	Zakuani 36' (o.g.); Grigg 81'; Donaldson 87'	Reports; BBC; BFC; PUFC; Highlights on YouTube	Payne 59'; Assombalonga 60'	Attendance: 6,014; Referee: Graham

30 November 2013 19	Notts County	0–1	Brentford	Meadow Lane
15:00		Reports; BBC; BFC; NCFC; Highlights on YouTube	Grigg 44'	Attendance: 5,132; Referee: Miller

==== December ====
14 December 2013 20	Brentford	1–0	Oldham Athletic	Griffin Park
15:00	Douglas 90+3'	Reports; BBC; BFC; OAFC; Highlights on YouTube		Attendance: 6,594; Referee: Berry

21 December 2013 21	Preston North End	0–3	Brentford	Deepdale
15:00		Reports; BBC; BFC; PNEFC; Highlights on YouTube	Forshaw 23' (.pen); Trotta 26'; Saunders 73'	Attendance: 10,332; Referee: Deadman

26 December 2013 22	Brentford	3–2	Swindon Town	Griffin Park
15:00	Saunders 27'; Donaldson 55'; Trotta 71'	Reports; BBC; BFC; STFC; Highlights on YouTube	Mason 10'; Ajose 53'	Attendance: 8,333; Referee: Hill

29 December 2013 23	Brentford	3–1	Milton Keynes Dons	Griffin Park
15:00	Donaldson 2'; Trotta 52'; Saunders 58'	Reports; BBC; BFC; MKDFC; Highlight on YouTube	Hodson 73'	Attendance: 8,010; Referee: D'Urso

==== January ====
1 January 2014 24	Peterborough United	1–3	Brentford	London Road
15:00	Payne 33'	Reports; BBC; BFC; PUFC; Highlights on YouTube	Forshaw 16' (.pen); Saunders 36'; Donaldson 90'	Attendance: 6,343; Referee: Madley

11 January 2014 25	Brentford	2–0	Port Vale	Griffin Park
15:00	Trotta 30'; Grigg 88'	Reports; BBC; BFC; PVFC; Highlights on YouTube		Attendance: 8,327; Referee: Gibbs

18 January 2014 26	Walsall	1–1	Brentford	Bescot Stadium
15:00	Westcarr 45'	Reports; BBC; BFC; WFC; Highlights on YouTube	Donaldson 30'	Attendance: 5,295; Referee: Duncan

24 January 2014 27	Brentford	2–1	Gillingham	Griffin Park
15:00	Douglas 22'; Trotta 70' (pen.)	Reports; BBC; BFC; GFC; Highlights on YouTube	McDonald 73'	Attendance: 7,713; Referee: Stroud

28 January 2014 28	Brentford	3–1	Bristol City	Griffin Park
19:45	Flint 9' (o.g.); Judge 26'; Trotta 42'	Reports; BBC; BFC; BCFC; Highlights on YouTube	Osborne 12'	Attendance: 6,517; Referee: Linington

==== February ====
1 February 2014 29	Shrewsbury Town	1–1	Brentford	New Meadow
15:00	Eaves 90'	Reports; BBC; BFC; STFC; Highlights on YouTube	Trotta 68'	Attendance: 4,927; Referee: Heywood

8 February 2014	Brentford	P–P	Crawley Town	Griffin Park
15:00

12 February 2014	Sheffield United	P–P	Brentford	Bramall Lane
19:45

15 February 2014 30	Crewe Alexandra	1–3	Brentford	Alexandra Stadium
15:00	Aneke 70' (pen.)	Reports; BBC; BFC; CAFC; Highlights on YouTube	Judge 9', 52'; Forshaw 61'	Attendance: 4,812; Referee: Salisbury

22 February 2014 31	Brentford	0–3	Wolverhampton Wanderers	Griffin Park
15:00		Reports; BBC; BFC; WWFC; Highlights on YouTube	Henry 45'; Jacobs 72', 85'	Attendance: 11,309; Referee: Williamson

==== March ====
1 March 2014 32	Carlisle United	0–0	Brentford	Brunton Park
15:00		Reports; BBC; BFC; CUFC; Highlights on YouTube		Attendance: 3,984; Referee: Naylor

8 March 2014 33	Brentford	2–0	Bradford City	Griffin Park
15:00	Donaldson 61'; Saville 76'	Reports; BBC; BFC; BCAFC; Highlights on YouTube		Attendance: 8,063; Referee: Bond

11 March 2014 34	Brentford	2–0	Tranmere Rovers	Griffin Park
19:45	Tarkowski 62'; Donaldson 74'	Reports; BBC; BFC; TRFC; Highlights on YouTube		Attendance: 5,646; Referee: Kettle

15 March 2014 35	Leyton Orient	0–1	Brentford	Brisbane Road
12:15		Reports; BBC; BFC; LOFC; Highlights on YouTube	Trotta 45'; Tarkowski (red card) 49'	Attendance: 8,335; Referee: Madley

22 March 2014 36	Brentford	3–1	Coventry City	Griffin Park
15:00	Donaldson 17'; Trotta 20'; McCormack 48'	Reports; BBC; BFC; CCFC; Highlights on YouTube	Wilson 6'	Attendance: 8,572; Referee: Ward

25 March 2014 37	Rotherham United	3–0	Brentford	New York Stadium
19:45	Agard 14' (.pen), 45'; Vuckic 90'	Reports; BBC; BFC; RUFC; Highlights on YouTube		Attendance: 8,365; Referee: Eltringham

29 March 2014 38	Oldham Athletic	0–0	Brentford	Boundary Park
15:00		Reports; BBC; BFC; OAFC; Highlights on YouTube		Attendance: 4,087; Referee: Duncan

==== April ====
1 April 2014 39	Sheffield United	0–0	Brentford	Bramall Lane
19:45		Reports; BBC; BFC; SUFC; Highlights on YouTube		Attendance: 15,730; Referee: Ilderton

5 April 2014 40	Brentford	3–1	Notts County	Griffin Park
15:00	Forshaw 32' (.pen); Judge 43', 52'	Reports; BBC; BFC; NCFC; Highlights on YouTube	Spencer 84'	Attendance: 8,188; Referee: Breakspear

8 April 2014 41	Brentford	1–0	Crawley Town	Griffin Park
19:45	Douglas 58'	Reports; BBC; BFC; CTFC; Highlights on YouTube		Attendance: 7,718; Referee: Martin

12 April 2014 42	Swindon Town	1–0	Brentford	County Ground
15:00	Thompson 45'	Reports; BBC; BFC; STFC; Highlights on YouTube	Forshaw (red card) 65'	Attendance: 9,342; Referee: Malone

18 April 2014 43	Brentford	1–0	Preston North End	Griffin Park
15:00	Judge 30' (.pen)	Reports; BBC; BFC; PNEFC; Highlights on YouTube		Attendance: 10,774; Referee: Hill

21 April 2014 44	Milton Keynes Dons	2–2	Brentford	Stadium MK
15:00	Gleeson 80' (pen.); McLeod 90'	Reports; BBC; BFC; MKDFC; Highlights on YouTube	Tarkowski 45'; Donaldson 59'	Attendance: 10,549; Referee: Robinson

26 April 2014 45	Colchester United	4–1	Brentford	Colchester Community Stadium
15:00	Bean 29'; Wynter 32'; Wilson 41' (.pen), 65'	Reports; BBC; BFC; CUFC; Highlights on YouTube	Dallas 45'	Attendance: 6,400; Referee: Brown

==== May ====
3 May 2014 46	Brentford	2–0	Stevenage	Griffin Park
15:00	Dallas 77'; Judge 90'	Reports; BBC; BFC; Highlights on YouTube		Attendance: 11,393; Referee: Phillips

== FA Cup ==
=== Matches ===
Win Draw Loss Postponed

9 November 2013 1st Round	Brentford	5–0	Staines Town	Griffin Park
15:00	McCormack 21' (pen.); Reeves 35'; Harris 38'; Trotta 90'; Donaldson 90+2'	Reports; BBC; BFC		Attendance: 5,263; Referee: Ruston

7 December 2013 2nd Round	Carlisle United	3–2	Brentford	Brunton Park
15:00	Berrett 45'; Miller 73', 77' (pen.)	Reports; BBC; BFC; CUFC	Chimbonda 63' (o.g.); El Alagui 86'	Attendance: 2,581; Referee: Woolmer

== League Cup ==
=== Matches ===
Win Draw Loss Postponed

6 August 2013 1st Round	Brentford	3–2	Dagenham & Redbridge	Griffin Park
19:45	El Alagui 62', 90'; Fillo 64'	Reports; BBC; BFC; D&RFC	Nugent 18' (o.g.); Scott 81'	Attendance: 3,586; Referee: Miller

27 August 2013 2nd Round	Derby County	5–0	Brentford	Pride Park
19:45	Martin 19', 77'; Sammon 36', 71'; Hughes 38'	Reports; BBC; BFC		Attendance: 9,076

== Football League Trophy ==
=== Matches ===
Win Draw Loss Postponed

3 September 2013 1st Round	Brentford	5–3	AFC Wimbledon	Griffin Park
19:00	El Alagui 42', 54'; Norris 52'; Nugent 64'; Venta 69'	Reports; BBC; BFC; AFCW; Highlights on YouTube	Fenlon 56'; Francomb 82'; Sweeney 90'	Attendance: 4,189; Referee: Collins

8 October 2013 2nd Round	Peterborough United	2–1	Brentford	London Road
19:45	Taylor 18' (o.g.); McCann 70' (pen.)	Reports; Sky Sports; BFC; PUFC; Highlights on YouTube	Nugent 80'	Attendance: 5,261; Referee: Davies

== First Team squad ==
Players' ages are as of the opening day of the 2013–14 season.

Squad No.	Name	Nationality	Position	Date of birth (age)	Signed from	Signed in	Notes
Goalkeepers
1	Richard Lee	(England)	GK	5 October 1982 (aged 30)	Watford	2010	
16	Jack Bonham	(Republic of Ireland)	GK	14 September 1993 (aged 19)	Watford	2013	Loaned to Arlesey Town
27	David Button	(England)	GK	27 February 1989 (aged 24)	Charlton Athletic	2013	
21	Liam O'Brien	(England)	GK	30 November 1991 (aged 21)	Barnet	2013	
Defenders
3	Scott Barron	(England)	LB	2 September 1985 (aged 27)	Millwall	2012	
5	Tony Craig	(England)	LB / CB	20 April 1985 (aged 28)	Millwall	2012	
6	Harlee Dean	(England)	CB	26 July 1991 (aged 22)	Southampton	2012	
14	Shaleum Logan	(England)	RB / RW	29 July 1988 (aged 25)	Manchester City	2011	Loaned to Aberdeen
24	Jake Bidwell	(England)	LB / LW	21 March 1991 (aged 22)	Everton	2013	
25	Raphaël Calvet	(France)	CB	7 February 1994 (aged 19)	AJ Auxerre	2013	
26	James Tarkowski	(England)	CB	19 November 1992 (aged 20)	Oldham Athletic	2014	
28	Nico Yennaris	(China)	RB / CM	24 May 1993 (aged 20)	Arsenal	2014	
31	Aaron Pierre	(Grenada)	CB	17 February 1993 (aged 20)	Academy	2011	Loaned to Cambridge United and Wycombe Wanderers
35	Alfie Mawson	(England)	LB / CB	19 January 1994 (aged 19)	Academy	2012	Loaned to Maidenhead United, Luton Town and Welling United
Midfielders
2	Kevin O'Connor (captain)	(Republic of Ireland)	CM / AM / RW / RB / CB	24 February 1982 (aged 31)	Academy	1999	
4	Adam Forshaw	(England)	RW / CM / AM	8 October 1991 (aged 21)	Everton	2012	
7	Sam Saunders	(England)	AM	29 August 1983 (aged 29)	Dagenham & Redbridge	2009	
8	Jonathan Douglas	(Republic of Ireland)	DM	12 November 1981 (aged 31)	Swindon Town	2011	
12	Alan McCormack	(Republic of Ireland)	CM / RB	10 January 1984 (aged 29)	Swindon Town	2013	
15	Stuart Dallas	(Northern Ireland)	AM	19 April 1991 (aged 22)	Crusaders	2012	Loaned to Northampton Town
17	George Saville	(Northern Ireland)	LW / CM	1 June 1993 (aged 20)	Chelsea	2013	On loan from Chelsea
18	Alan Judge	(Republic of Ireland)	AM	11 November 1988 (aged 24)	Blackburn Rovers	2014	On loan from Blackburn Rovers
19	Martin Fillo	(Czech Republic)	RW	7 February 1986 (aged 27)	FC Viktoria Plzeň	2013	On loan from FC Viktoria Plzeň
20	Toumani Diagouraga	(France)	CM	9 June 1987 (aged 26)	Peterborough United	2010	Loaned to Portsmouth
22	Jake Reeves	(England)	CM	30 May 1993 (aged 20)	Academy	2011	
30	Emmanuel Oyeleke	(England)	RW	24 December 1992 (aged 20)	Academy	2010	Loaned to Aldershot Town
32	Charlie Adams	(England)	LW / CM	16 May 1994 (aged 19)	Academy	2011	Loaned to Barnet
34	Josh Clarke	(England)	RW	1 July 1994 (aged 19)	Academy	2011	Loaned to Maidenhead United and Braintree Town
36	Tyrell Miller-Rodney	(England)	CM	23 April 1994 (aged 19)	Academy	2011	Loaned to Maidenhead United
38	Louis Hutton	(England)	CM	9 September 1994 (aged 18)	Manchester City	2014	
Forwards
9	Clayton Donaldson	(Jamaica)	ST	7 February 1984 (aged 29)	Crewe Alexandra	2011	
10	Farid El Alagui	(Morocco)	ST	28 August 1985 (aged 27)	Falkirk	2012	Loaned to Dundee United
11	Will Grigg	(Northern Ireland)	ST	3 July 1991 (aged 22)	Walsall	2013	
29	Marcello Trotta	(Italy)	ST	29 September 1992 (aged 20)	Fulham	2013	On loan from Fulham
33	Luke Norris	(England)	ST	3 June 1993 (aged 20)	Academy	2010	Loaned to Northampton Town and Dagenham & Redbridge
Players who appeared during the 2013–14 season but departed before the end of the season
~~18~~	Javi Venta	(Spain)	RB	13 December 1975 (aged 37)	Villarreal	2013	Released
~~23~~	Paul Hayes	(England)	ST	20 September 1983 (aged 29)	Charlton Athletic	2012	Loaned to Plymouth Argyle, released
23	Chuba Akpom	(England)	ST	9 October 1995 (aged 17)	Arsenal	2014	Returned to Arsenal after loan
~~25~~	Conor McAleny	(England)	ST	12 August 1992 (aged 20)	Everton	2013	Returned to Everton after loan
~~26~~	João Carlos Teixeira	(Portugal)	CM	18 January 1993 (aged 20)	Liverpool	2013	Returned to Liverpool after loan
~~26~~	Kadeem Harris	(England)	LW	8 June 1993 (aged 20)	Cardiff City	2013	Returned to Cardiff City after loan
~~28~~	Ben Nugent	(England)	CB	23 July 1993 (aged 20)	Cardiff City	2013	Returned to Cardiff City after loan
~~38~~	Martin Taylor	(England)	CB	9 November 1979 (aged 33)	Sheffield Wednesday	2013	Returned to Sheffield Wednesday

Source: soccerbase.com

== Coaching staff ==
Last updated 10 January 2014

Name	Role
(England) Mark Warburton	Manager
(Scotland) David Weir	Assistant Manager
(England) Frank McParland	Sporting Director
(England) Simon Royce	Goalkeeping Coach
(England) Ben Wood	Physiotherapist
(England) Neil Greig	Head of Medical
(England) Bob Oteng	Kit Man

== Statistics ==
=== Appearances and goals ===
Last updated 31 May 2014

No.	Pos	Nat	Player	Total		League One		FA Cup		League Cup		FL Trophy	
No.	Pos	Nat	Player	Apps	Goals	Apps	Goals	Apps	Goals	Apps	Goals	Apps	Goals
1	GK	(England) ENG	Richard Lee	5	0	4	0	1	0	0	0	0	0
2	DF	(Ireland) EIR	Kevin O'Connor	12	0	6+3	0	0	0	2	0	1	0
3	DF	(England) ENG	Scott Barron	5	0	2	0	0	0	2	0	1	0
4	MF	(England) ENG	Adam Forshaw	40	8	36+3	8	1	0	0	0	0	0
5	DF	(England) ENG	Tony Craig	48	0	43+1	0	2	0	1	0	1	0
6	DF	(England) ENG	Harlee Dean	33	0	30+2	0	1	0	0	0	0	0
7	MF	(England) ENG	Sam Saunders	22	5	6+11	5	0+1	0	2	0	2	0
8	MF	(Ireland) EIR	Jonathan Douglas	37	3	35	3	1	0	0	0	1	0
9	FW	(Jamaica) JAM	Clayton Donaldson	48	18	46	17	2	1	0	0	0	0
10	FW	(Morocco) MAR	Farid El Alagui	18	6	1+11	1	0+2	1	1+1	2	1+1	2
11	FW	(Northern Ireland) NIR	Will Grigg	36	5	16+18	5	1+1	0	0	0	0	0
12	MF	(Ireland) EIR	Alan McCormack	45	2	43	1	2	1	0	0	0	0
14	DF	(England) ENG	Shaleum Logan	19	1	14+4	1	0	0	0	0	1	0
15	MF	(Northern Ireland) NIR	Stuart Dallas	21	2	6+12	2	0	0	2	0	1	0
16	GK	(Ireland) EIR	Jack Bonham	3	0	0+1	0	0	0	2	0	0	0
18	DF	(Spain) ESP	Javi Venta	4	1	0+1	0	0	0	2	0	0+1	1
20	MF	(France) FRA	Toumani Diagouraga	24	0	10+9	0	1+1	0	1	0	2	0
21	GK	(England) ENG	Liam O'Brien	0	0	0	0	0	0	0	0	0	0
22	MF	(England) ENG	Jake Reeves	25	1	6+14	0	1+1	1	2	0	0+1	0
23	FW	(England) ENG	Paul Hayes	1	0	0	0	0	0	1	0	0	0
24	DF	(England) ENG	Jake Bidwell	41	0	38	0	2	0	0	0	1	0
25	DF	(France) FRA	Raphaël Calvet	1	0	0	0	0	0	0	0	1	0
26	DF	(England) ENG	James Tarkowski	13	1	13	1	0	0	0	0	0	0
27	GK	(England) ENG	David Button	45	0	42	0	1	0	0	0	2	0
28	MF	(China) CHN	Nico Yennaris	8	0	5+3	0	0	0	0	0	0	0
30	MF	(England) ENG	Emmanuel Oyeleke	1	0	0	0	0	0	1	0	0	0
31	DF	(Grenada) GRN	Aaron Pierre	2	0	0	0	0	0	0+1	0	0+1	0
32	MF	(England) ENG	Charlie Adams	3	0	0+3	0	0	0	0	0	0	0
33	FW	(England) ENG	Luke Norris	3	1	0+1	0	0	0	0+1	0	1	1
34	MF	(England) ENG	Josh Clarke	3	0	0+1	0	0	0	1	0	1	0
35	DF	(England) ENG	Alfie Mawson	1	0	0	0	0	0	0+1	0	0	0
36	MF	(England) ENG	Tyrell Miller-Rodney	0	0	0	0	0	0	0	0	0	0
38	MF	(England) ENG	Louis Hutton	0	0	0	0	0	0	0	0	0	0
Players featured for Brentford on loan this season:
17	MF	(Northern Ireland) NIR	George Saville	44	3	33+7	3	2	0	0	0	2	0
18	MF	(Ireland) EIR	Alan Judge	22	7	22	7	0	0	0	0	0	0
19	MF	(Czech Republic) CZE	Martin Fillo	9	1	4+3	0	0	0	0+1	1	1	0
23	ST	(England) ENG	Chuba Akpom	4	0	0+4	0	0	0	0	0	0	0
25	FW	(England) ENG	Conor McAleny	4	0	3+1	0	0	0	0	0	0	0
26	MF	(Portugal) POR	João Carlos Teixeira	2	0	0+2	0	0	0	0	0	0	0
26	MF	(England) ENG	Kadeem Harris	11	2	9+1	1	1	1	0	0	0	0
28	DF	(England) ENG	Ben Nugent	5	2	0	0	1	0	2	0	1+1	2
29	FW	(Italy) ITA	Marcello Trotta	40	13	28+9	12	2	1	0	0	1	0
38	DF	(England) ENG	Martin Taylor	6	2	5	2	0	0	0	0	1	0

- Players listed in italics left the club mid-season.

=== Goalscorers ===
No	Pos	Nat	Player	FL1	FAC	FLC	FLT	Total
9	FW	(Jamaica)	Clayton Donaldson	17	1	0	0	18
29	FW	(Italy)	Marcello Trotta	13	1	—	0	14
4	MF	(England)	Adam Forshaw	8	0	0	0	8
18	MF	(Republic of Ireland)	Alan Judge	7	—	—	—	7
10	FW	(France)	Farid El Alagui	1	1	2	2	6
7	MF	(England)	Sam Saunders	5	0	0	0	5
11	FW	(Northern Ireland)	Will Grigg	4	0	0	0	4
17	MF	(Northern Ireland)	George Saville	4	0	0	0	4
8	MF	(Republic of Ireland)	Jonathan Douglas	3	0	0	0	3
26	DF	(England)	James Tarkowski	2	—	—	—	2
38	DF	(England)	Martin Taylor	2	—	—	0	2
15	MF	(Northern Ireland)	Stuart Dallas	2	0	0	0	2
26	MF	(England)	Kadeem Harris	1	1	—	—	2
12	MF	(Republic of Ireland)	Alan McCormack	1	1	0	0	2
28	DF	(England)	Ben Nugent	0	0	0	2	2
14	DF	(England)	Shaleum Logan	1	0	0	0	1
33	FW	(England)	Luke Norris	0	—	0	1	1
18	DF	(Spain)	Javi Venta	0	—	0	1	1
22	MF	(England)	Jake Reeves	0	1	0	0	1
19	MF	(Czech Republic)	Martin Fillo	0	0	1	0	1
Opponents				2	1	0	0	3
Total				72	7	3	6	88

- Players listed in italics left the club mid-season.
- Source: Soccerbase

=== Discipline ===
No	Pos	Nat	Player	FL1		FAC		FLC		FLT		Total		Pts
No	Pos	Nat	Player	Yellow card	Red card	Yellow card	Red card	Yellow card	Red card	Yellow card	Red card	Yellow card	Red card	Pts
6	DF	(England)	Harlee Dean	10	0	0	0	0	0	0	0	10	0	10
17	MF	(Northern Ireland)	George Saville	9	0	1	0	0	0	0	0	10	0	10
5	DF	(England)	Tony Craig	7	1	0	0	0	0	0	0	7	1	10
12	MF	(Republic of Ireland)	Alan McCormack	9	0	0	0	0	0	0	0	9	0	9
4	MF	(England)	Adam Forshaw	5	1	0	0	0	0	0	0	5	1	8
26	DF	(England)	James Tarkowski	3	1	—		—		—		3	1	6
18	MF	(Republic of Ireland)	Alan Judge	5	0	—		—		—		5	0	5
20	MF	(France)	Toumani Diagouraga	5	0	0	0	0	0	0	0	5	0	5
9	FW	(Jamaica)	Clayton Donaldson	5	0	0	0	0	0	0	0	5	0	5
29	FW	(Italy)	Marcello Trotta	4	0	0	0	—		0	0	4	0	4
26	GK	(England)	David Button	1	1	0	0	0	0	0	0	1	1	4
7	MF	(England)	Sam Saunders	3	0	0	0	0	0	0	0	3	0	3
24	DF	(England)	Jake Bidwell	2	0	0	0	0	0	1	0	3	0	3
8	MF	(Republic of Ireland)	Jonathan Douglas	2	0	0	0	0	0	1	0	3	0	3
28	DF	(China)	Nico Yennaris	2	0	—		—		—		2	0	2
14	DF	(England)	Shaleum Logan	2	0	0	0	0	0	0	0	2	0	2
22	MF	(England)	Jake Reeves	1	0	0	0	0	0	0	0	1	0	1
15	MF	(Northern Ireland)	Stuart Dallas	1	0	0	0	0	0	0	0	1	0	1
10	FW	(France)	Farid El Alagui	0	0	0	0	1	0	0	0	1	0	1
2	DF	(Republic of Ireland)	Kevin O'Connor	0	0	0	0	1	0	0	0	1	0	1
25	DF	(France)	Raphaël Calvet	0	0	0	0	0	0	1	0	1	0	1
Total				76	4	1	0	2	0	3	0	82	4	94

- Players listed in italics left the club mid-season.
- Source: Soccerbase

=== Management ===
Name	Nat	From	To	Record All Comps					Record League				
Name	Nat	From	To	P	W	D	L	W %	P	W	D	L	W %
Mark Warburton	(England)	10 December 2013	present	27	18	5	4	66.67	27	18	5	4	66.67
Caretaker Management Team_{1}		7 December 2013	10 December 2013	1	0	0	1	0.00	0	0	0	0	—
Uwe Rösler	(Germany)	10 June 2011	7 December 2013	24	14	4	6	58.33	19	11	4	4	57.89

_{1}Alan Kernaghan, Peter Farrell & Mark Warburton
Source: brentfordfc.co.uk

=== Competition summary by month ===
Last Updated 8 April 2014

	Summary							League One						FA Cup					League Cup					League Trophy				
Month	Pd	W	D	L	F	A	Pt	W	D	L	F	A	Pt	W	D	L	F	A	W	D	L	F	A	W	D	L	F	A
August	7	3	3	1	9	10	9	2	3	0	6	3	9	–	–	–	–	–	1	0	1	3	7	–	–	–	–	–
September	5	3	0	2	11	12	6	2	0	2	6	9	6	–	–	–	–	–	–	–	–	–	–	1	0	0	5	3
October	6	3	0	3	8	7	9	3	0	2	7	5	9	–	–	–	–	–	–	–	–	–	–	0	0	1	1	2
November	6	5	1	0	15	2	13	4	1	0	10	2	13	1	0	0	5	0	–	–	–	–	–	–	–	–	–	–
December	5	4	0	1	12	6	12	4	0	0	10	3	12	0	0	1	2	3	–	–	–	–	–	–	–	–	–	–
January	5	4	1	0	11	4	13	4	1	0	11	4	13	–	–	–	–	–	–	–	–	–	–	–	–	–	–	–
February	3	1	1	1	4	5	4	1	1	1	4	5	4	–	–	–	–	–	–	–	–	–	–	–	–	–	–	–
March	7	4	2	1	8	4	14	4	2	1	8	4	14	–	–	–	–	–	–	–	–	–	–	–	–	–	–	–
April	7	3	2	2	8	8	11	3	2	2	8	8	11	–	–	–	–	–	–	–	–	–	–	–	–	–	–	–
May	1	1	0	0	2	0	3	1	0	0	2	0	3	–	–	–	–	–	–	–	–	–	–	–	–	–	–	–
Total	52	31	10	11	88	58	94	28	10	8	72	43	94	1	0	1	7	3	1	0	1	3	7	1	0	1	6	5

== Transfers & loans ==
Players transferred in
Date	Pos.	Name	Previous club	Fee	Ref.
1 July 2013	GK	(Republic of Ireland) Jack Bonham	(England) Watford	Free	
1 July 2013	DF	(England) Jake Bidwell	(England) Everton	Undisclosed	
1 July 2013	FW	(Northern Ireland) Will Grigg	(England) Walsall	£325,000	
1 July 2013	MF	(Republic of Ireland) Alan McCormack	(England) Swindon Town	Free	
1 July 2013	DF	(England) Jack Uttridge	(England) Histon	Free	
11 July 2013	DF	(Spain) Javi Venta	(Spain) Villarreal	Free	
30 July 2013	GK	(England) David Button	(England) Charlton Athletic	Free	
15 August 2013	GK	(England) Liam O'Brien	(England) Barnet	Free	
2 September 2013	DF	(France) Raphaël Calvet	(France) AJ Auxerre	Undisclosed	
24 September 2013	DF	(England) Kieran Morris	(England) Stourbridge	Free	
27 January 2014	MF	(China) Nico Yennaris	(England) Arsenal	Undisclosed	
31 January 2014	DF	(England) James Tarkowski	(England) Oldham Athletic	Undisclosed	
6 February 2014	MF	(England) Louis Hutton	(England) Manchester City	Free	
Players loaned in
Date from	Pos.	Name	From	End date	Ref.
24 June 2013	MF	(Northern Ireland) George Saville	(England) Chelsea	End of season	
12 July 2013	MF	(Czech Republic) Martin Fillo	(Czech Republic) FC Viktoria Plzeň	End of season	
25 July 2013	FW	(England) Conor McAleny	(England) Everton	6 January 2014	
1 August 2013	DF	(England) Ben Nugent	(Wales) Cardiff City	5 January 2014	
2 September 2013	FW	(Italy) Marcello Trotta	(England) Fulham	End of season	
10 September 2013	DF	(England) Martin Taylor	(England) Sheffield Wednesday	4 November 2013	
10 September 2013	MF	(Portugal) João Carlos Teixeira	(England) Liverpool	8 October 2013	
19 October 2013	MF	(England) Kadeem Harris	(Wales) Cardiff City	5 January 2014	
8 January 2014	MF	(Republic of Ireland) Alan Judge	(England) Blackburn Rovers	End of season	
9 January 2014	FW	(England) Chuba Akpom	(England) Arsenal	10 February 2014	
Players transferred out
Date	Pos.	Name	Subsequent club	Fee	Ref
1 July 2013	MF	(England) Harry Forrester	(England) Doncaster Rovers	Undisclosed	
30 July 2013	GK	(England) Simon Moore	(England) Cardiff City	Undisclosed	
Players loaned out
Date from	Pos.	Name	To	End date	Ref.
9 August 2013	MF	(England) Emmanuel Oyeleke	(England) Aldershot Town	28 January 2014	
4 October 2013	DF	(England) Alfie Mawson	(England) Maidenhead United	28 November 2013	
4 October 2013	FW	(England) Paul Hayes	(England) Plymouth Argyle	2 November 2013	
5 October 2013	MF	(Northern Ireland) Stuart Dallas	(England) Northampton Town	23 December 2013	
18 October 2013	FW	(England) Luke Norris	(England) Northampton Town	4 January 2014	
15 November 2013	GK	(Republic of Ireland) Jack Bonham	(England) Arlesey Town	8 February 2014	
28 November 2013	DF	(Grenada) Aaron Pierre	(England) Cambridge United	4 January 2013	
28 November 2013	DF	(England) Alfie Mawson	(England) Luton Town	10 January 2013	
28 November 2013	MF	(England) Joe Maloney	(England) Burnham	4 February 2014	
4 December 2013	MF	(England) Josh Clarke	(England) Maidenhead United	4 January 2014	
8 January 2014	FW	(Morocco) Farid El Alagui	(Scotland) Dundee United	End of season	
23 January 2014	FW	(England) Luke Norris	(England) Dagenham & Redbridge	End of season	
30 January 2014	DF	(England) Shaleum Logan	(Scotland) Aberdeen	End of season	
31 January 2014	MF	(England) Alfie Mawson	(England) Welling United	26 April 2014	
11 February 2014	MF	(England) Charlie Adams	(England) Barnet	10 March 2014	
11 February 2014	MF	(England) Montell Moore	(England) Burnham	March 2014	
11 February 2014	DF	(England) George Pilbeam	(England) Burnham	End of season	
17 February 2014	MF	(France) Toumani Diagouraga	(England) Portsmouth	26 March 2014	
17 February 2014	MF	(England) Josh Clarke	(England) Braintree Town	12 March 2014	
21 February 2014	MF	(England) Tyrell Miller-Rodney	(England) Maidenhead United	27 March 2014	
28 February 2014	DF	(Grenada) Aaron Pierre	(England) Wycombe Wanderers	End of season	
March 2014	MF	(England) Lewis Lavender	(England) Burnham	End of season	
27 March 2014	MF	(England) Emmanuel Oyeleke	(England) Aldershot Town	End of season	
April 2014	GK	(England) Joe Taylor	(England) Eastbourne Town	End of season	
Players released
Date	Pos.	Name	Subsequent club	Join date	Ref.
30 September 2013	DF	(Spain) Javi Venta	Retired		
3 December 2013	FW	(England) Paul Hayes	(England) Scunthorpe United	1 January 2014	
30 June 2014	DF	(England) Scott Barron	Retired		
30 June 2014	FW	(Jamaica) Clayton Donaldson	(England) Birmingham City	1 July 2014	
30 June 2014	FW	(Morocco) Farid El Alagui	(Scotland) Hibernian	14 July 2014	
30 June 2014	DF	(England) Shaleum Logan	(Scotland) Aberdeen	1 July 2014	
30 June 2014	FW	(England) Luke Norris	(England) Gillingham	3 July 2014	
30 June 2014	GK	(England) Liam O'Brien	(England) Dagenham & Redbridge	1 July 2014	
30 June 2014	MF	(England) Michael Onovwigun	(England) Chesterfield	31 July 2014	
30 June 2014	DF	(Grenada) Aaron Pierre	(England) Wycombe Wanderers	1 July 2014	
30 June 2014	DF	(England) Jack Uttridge	(England) Histon	2015	

== Kit ==
For the 2013–14 season adidas return as kit manufacturers having previously supplied kits in the early 1980s. For the 2nd consecutive year local transport company SKYex is the kit sponsor.

Supplier: adidas
Sponsor(s): Skyex.co.uk

Home	Home_{1}	Away	Goalkeeper	Goalkeeper_{1}

Source: Bees Superstore

_{1} Alternate Kit

== Development squad ==
=== Squad ===
Players' ages are as of the opening day of the 2013–14 senior season.

Name	Nationality	Position	Date of birth (age)	Previous club	Signed in	Notes
Defenders
Raphaël Calvet	(France)	CB	7 February 1994 (aged 19)	AJ Auxerre	2013	
Alfie Mawson	(England)	LB / CB	19 January 1994 (aged 19)	Academy	2010	Loaned to Cambridge United and Wycombe Wanderers
Kieran Morris	(England)	CB	26 June 1995 (aged 18)	Stourbridge	2013	
Aaron Pierre	(Grenada)	LB	17 February 1993 (aged 20)	Academy	2011	Loaned to Maidenhead United, Luton Town and Welling United
Jack Uttridge	(England)	CB	14 January 1995 (aged 18)	Histon	2013	
Midfielders
Charlie Adams	(England)	LW / CM	16 May 1994 (aged 19)	Academy	2011	Loaned to Barnet
Josh Clarke	(England)	RW	1 July 1994 (aged 19)	Academy	2011	Loaned to Maidenhead United and Braintree Town
Louis Hutton	(England)	CM	9 September 1994 (aged 18)	Manchester City	2014	
Joe Maloney	(England)	CM	21 March 1995 (aged 18)	Academy	2013	Loaned to Burnham
Tyrone Francis	(England)	CM	15 June 1994 (aged 19)	Academy	2013	Loaned to AFC Wimbledon
Tyler Miller-Rodney	(England)	CM	23 April 1994 (aged 19)	Academy	2011	Loaned to Maidenhead United
Emmanuel Oyeleke	(England)	RW	24 December 1992 (aged 20)	Academy	2010	Loaned to Aldershot Town
Forwards
Luke Norris	(England)	ST	3 June 1993 (aged 20)	Academy	2010	Loaned to Northampton Town and Dagenham & Redbridge

Source: brentfordfc.co.uk

=== Professional Development League Two South Division ===
==== League table ====
Matches played up to 31 May 2014

Pos	Team	Pld	W	D	L	GF	GA	GD	Pts
6	Charlton Athletic U21s	18	5	8	5	25	25	0	23
7	Brighton & Hove Albion U21s	18	6	5	7	26	27	−1	23
8	Swansea City U21s	18	6	4	8	23	24	−1	22
9	Brentford U21s	18	5	3	10	25	40	−15	18
10	Ipswich Town U21s	18	3	5	10	18	33	−15	14

==== Matches ====
Win Draw Loss Postponed

20 August 2013 1	Brentford DS	2–1	Bristol City DS	Jersey Road
	Hayes (2)	Reports; BFC; Highlights on YouTube	Reid

16 September 2013 2	Brighton DS	1–1	Brentford DS	Culver Road
	Richards 41' (pen.)	Reports; BFC	Mawson 9'

30 September 2013 3	Brentford DS	4–2	Charlton Athletic DS	Jersey Road
	Douglas; Trotta (2); Norris	Reports; BFC	Sho-Silva; Daniel

14 October 2013 4	Cardiff City DS	3–1	Brentford DS	Cardiff City Stadium
	Gestede 41', 87'; Healy 73'	Reports; BFC; CCFC	Norris 70'

22 October 2013 5	QPR DS	4–0	Brentford DS	Loftus Road
	Petrasso (2); Chevanton (2)	Reports; BFC; QPRFC

5 November 2013 6	Brentford DS	1–2	Crystal Palace DS	Griffin Park
	Fillo	Reports; BFC; CPFC	Dymond; Sekajja

26 November 2013 7	Brentford DS	1–4	Ipswich Town DS	Jersey Road
	Mawson; Pilbeam (red card)	Reports; BFC	Lee; Adekunle; Clarke; Wordsworth

14 January 2014 8	Ipswich Town DS	1–1	Brentford DS	Ipswich Training Ground
1pm	Adams	Reports; BFC	Leddy

27 January 2014 9	Brentford DS	2–1	Brighton & Hove Albion DS	Jersey Road
	Adams; Mawson	Reports; BFC	Dickenson

30 January 2014 10	Brentford DS	0–0	Swansea City DS	Jersey Road
		Reports; BFC

17 February 2014 11	Swansea City DS	2–1	Brentford DS
	King; Bray	Reports; BFC	Oyeleke

25 February 2014 12	Brentford DS	2–0	Millwall DS	Jersey Road
	Grigg 42'; Dallas 75'	Reports; BFC

3 March 2014 13	Charlton DS	6–3	Brentford DS	Charlton Athletic Training Ground
	Cedric Evina 14'; Marvin Sordell 48'; Sho-Silva 50', 59'; Anıl Koç 65'; Kevin Feely 83'	Reports; BFC	Martin Fillo 44', 45', 51'

10 March 2014 14	Bristol City DS	2–1	Brentford DS
	Barnett; Bishop	Reports; BFC	Awotwi

18 March 2014 15	Millwall DS	3–2	Brentford DS
	Farrell; O'Brien (2)	Reports; BFC	Miller-Rodney (2)

24 March 2014 16	Brentford DS	2–0	Cardiff DS	Griffin Park
	Greene; Maloney	Reports; BFC

31 March 2014 17	Brentford DS	1–2	QPR DS	Jersey Road
	Moore	Reports; BFC	Maïga; Magri

8 April 2014 18	Crystal Palace DS	6–0	Brentford DS	KNK Stadium
	Gayle (5); McCarthy	Reports; BFC
