= Mark Warburton =

English footballer and manager (born 1962)

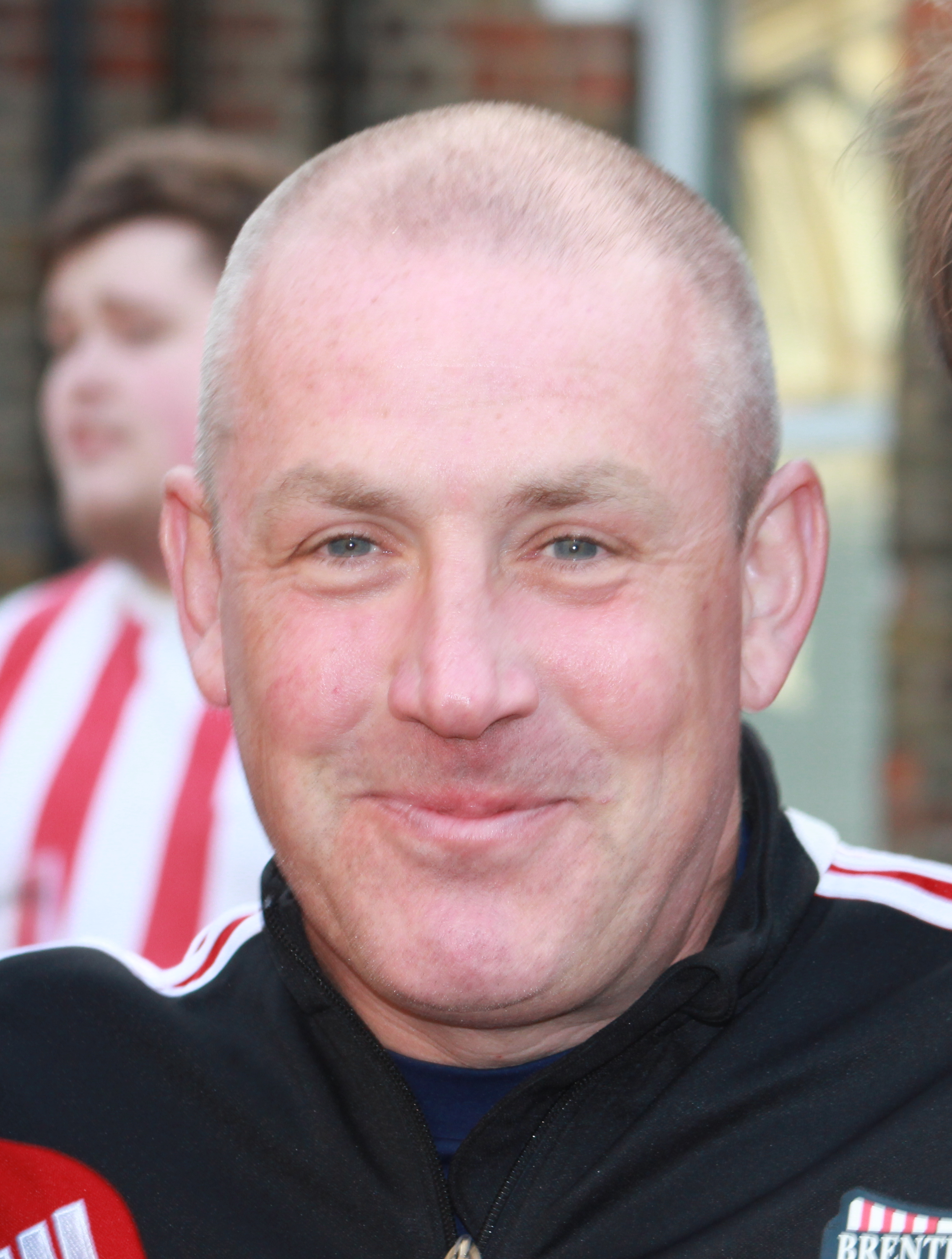
- Warburton in 2014

Personal information
- Date of birth: 6 September 1962 (age 64)
- Place of birth: London, England
- Position: Defender

Team information
- Current team: Sporting JAX

Youth career
- 1977–1979: Leicester City

Senior career*
Years	Team	Apps	(Gls)
1981–1985	Enfield	28	(1)
1985–1988	Boreham Wood	107	(2)
Total		135	(3)

Managerial career
- 2013–2015: Brentford
- 2015–2017: Rangers
- 2017: Nottingham Forest
- 2019–2022: Queens Park Rangers
- * Club domestic league appearances and goals

Mark Warburton (born 6 September 1962) is an English professional football manager and former player who is currently the Sporting Director and Head of Soccer for Sporting JAX of the United Soccer League.

As a player, Warburton was a right back at non-League level with Enfield and Boreham Wood. He began his coaching career in the academy at Watford, before moving to Brentford in February 2011, serving as a coach and sporting director until being appointed manager in December 2013. He led the club from League One to promotion to the Championship in the 2013–14 season and finished the following season with the club's best second-tier placing for 80 years. He managed Rangers in Scotland from 2015 to 2017, winning the Scottish Championship title and the Scottish Challenge Cup in his first season. He joined Nottingham Forest in March 2017, but was dismissed after nine months.

== Playing career ==
Growing up in London, Warburton attended The Latymer School, Edmonton. A defender, Warburton began his playing career as an apprentice at Leicester City under Frank McLintock and later dropped into Non-League football with Enfield. Warburton took a dislike to the methods of McLintock's successor at Leicester, Jock Wallace, later saying "he was a Marine. We had runs on sand-dunes, running until we threw up. I learned a lot from that, never treating a player that way".

Warburton had a successful four years at Enfield, winning the 1981–82 FA Trophy and 1982–83 Alliance Premier League title. He battled for the right back spot at the club with Trevor Savage and scored his only league goal for the club past Boston United goalkeeper Kevin Blackwell in a 2–0 win during the 1982–83 season. After leaving Enfield in 1985, Warburton later played for Isthmian League side Boreham Wood, Scottish non-league side Stoneyburn Juniors and also spent time playing in Charlotte and Chicago men's leagues while living in the United States. Cruciate injuries ended his playing career.

== Coaching career ==
Warburton began his coaching career in a part-time role at St. Clement Danes School in Chorleywood while working at the operational dealing department of a bank. He later said to his wife, "we have the money in the bank, the house is paid for, our lifestyle won't change. I want to do this: 10 years to achieve something in the game. It's now or never". After leaving his trading job in the early 2000s, he spent his own money travelling around Europe, watching coaching sessions at Sporting CP, Ajax, Valencia, Barcelona and Willem II.

Warburton was offered a permanent coaching job with Watford, at U9 through to U16 level and was appointed manager of the academy in 2006. After a reshuffle in 2009, he became assistant academy manager for U17 to U19 age groups. While at Watford, he established links with Harefield Academy. Warburton left Watford in February 2010 to "pursue other sporting interests". Warburton later said in 2014 that he left Watford because he "had a fall out with one or two people. I was treated very shabbily, but they have gone now, so I've got no grudges against the club".

Nicky Forster was appointed caretaker manager of League One side Brentford in February 2011 and named Warburton as first team coach. Warburton had previously worked with Brentford owner Matthew Benham on the NextGen Series and explained that he "got a call from the owner at 1:30 in the morning, asking if I would come in to assist Nicky. I didn't know a lot about Brentford or know any of the players, so I stayed up for the rest of the night looking at player profiles". Following a successful interim period, Forster was given the role on a permanent basis until the end of the 2010–11 season. Warburton assisted Forster until the end of the season. After the departure of Rösler to Championship side Wigan Athletic on 7 December 2013, assistant manager Alan Kernaghan took charge of the team for that day's 3–2 FA Cup second round defeat away to Carlisle United. Warburton was included as part of the coaching team, alongside first team coach Peter Farrell.

On 24 June 2022, West Ham United appointed Warburton as a first-team coach, becoming part of manager David Moyes' backroom staff. He left the club in June 2023 wishing to seek out a more senior role in football.

== Managerial career ==
=== Brentford ===
==== 2013–14: Debut season ====
After turning down an opportunity to follow previous manager Uwe Rösler to Wigan Athletic, Warburton was announced as the new Brentford manager on 10 December 2013, on a deal running until the end of the 2013–14 season. He said "I don't think I could have taken being rejected (for the manager's job) again. I was invited to apply and if I hadn't I would just have stayed as Sporting Director". A 90th-minute goal from Jonathan Douglas versus Oldham Athletic on 14 December gave Warburton a 1–0 win in his first official match in charge. Warburton cited a need to put his "fingerprint on the squad and coaching staff", which led to Alan Kernaghan and Peter Farrell departing the club on 16 December and David Weir's appointment as assistant manager the same day.

A 3–1 win over Milton Keynes Dons at Griffin Park on 29 December sent Brentford to the top of League One and meant that Warburton became the first Brentford manager to win his first four games. The run extended to six straight wins after a 3–1 away victory over Peterborough United on 1 January 2014. Defender Alan McCormack commented that "a change in management often means a new man bringing in their own staff and own ideas, but he (Warburton) has kept it pretty much the same, just making one or two changes". Warburton's winning start garnered him the League One Manager of the Month award for December 2013. Four wins and a draw in January 2014 saw Warburton nominated for the League One Manager of the Month award for the second month in succession. A 3–0 home defeat to Wolverhampton Wanderers on 22 February gave Warburton his first defeat as Brentford manager, ending a run of 19 league games unbeaten.

While briefing the team in their hotel in Canary Wharf on the eve of a crunch match against Leyton Orient in mid-March, Warburton drew on his trading background to demonstrate the pressures of the job to coach David Weir, kit man Bob Oteng and players Jonathan Douglas, Clayton Donaldson and Marcello Trotta, taking them on a tour of the dealing room at HSBC. Playing in front of the Sky Sports cameras the following day, a goal from Trotta was enough to see the Bees to a victory which returned them to the automatic promotion places in League One. Five wins and two draws in March meant Warburton received his third League One Manager of the Month nomination in four months.

A 1–0 win over Preston North End at Griffin Park on 18 April saw Brentford promoted to the Championship as runners-up to Wolverhampton Wanderers with three games to spare. In his 27 games as manager during the 2013–14 season, Warburton won 17, drew six and lost four. On 26 June, Warburton pledged his future to the Bees by signing a one-year rolling contract.

==== 2014–15: The Championship ====
Warburton's first game in management at Championship level took place against London neighbours Charlton Athletic on 9 August 2014. After the 1–1 draw, he said "we've got a lot of young players who will find their feet, but when you start a new job and move up you have to adapt to your new environment quickly because no allowances will be given". Warburton led the club to their first league win of the season on 19 August, winning 2–1 at Blackpool. A 3–2 win over Brighton & Hove Albion on 13 September lifted the Bees into the Championship playoff places for the first time in the season. Wins over Nottingham Forest and Millwall saw Warburton named as the manager of the Football League Team of the Week for 3–9 November. A club record-equalling five successive second-tier wins sent Brentford to third-place in the division at the end of November (the club's highest placing in the league pyramid since the opening day of the 1952–53 season) and earned Warburton the Championship Manager of the Month award and the LMA Performance of the Week award for a 4–0 victory over Wolverhampton Wanderers. At the end of 2014, Warburton had managed the Bees to the best home record in the Football League in 2014. Three wins from four in January 2015 earned Warburton a second Championship Manager of the Month nomination in three months.

On 10 February 2015, an article in The Times claimed Warburton would be replaced as manager at the end of the 2014–15 season. A week later, a club statement confirmed that Warburton, assistant David Weir and Sporting Director Frank McParland would be leaving Brentford at the end of the 2014–15 season, citing the trio's differences with owner Matthew Benham's anticipated remodelling of the club's management structure, which would include recruitment being based on mathematical modelling and statistics allied to normal scouting methods. The Hounslow Chronicle later dubbed the saga "Warburtongate". Ahead of Brentford's playoff campaign in May 2015, Warburton revealed the truth about his departure, saying "I think the manager has to pick the team and have the final say, in my opinion. I think there's going to be a much greater emphasis on mathematical modelling than currently. There are certain aspects which I think have worked well at this football club, but Matthew's the owner and the board have made a decision". Between the outbreak of the news and the end of the 2014–15 season, Warburton was linked with the managerial jobs at Leicester City, Queens Park Rangers, Aston Villa, Derby County, Newcastle United, Leeds United and Norwich City.

Brentford's form suffered in the wake of the announcement of Warburton's departure, with successive defeats to Watford and Charlton Athletic dropping the club from 6th to 7th place and out of the playoff positions. On 5 March, Warburton won the London Manager of the Year award at the 2015 London Football Awards. A run of 17 points from a possible 27 (including a 4–1 victory over Fulham at Craven Cottage, Brentford's biggest ever league win at the ground of their West London rivals) saw the side rise to fifth in the table on 3 April. More dropped points saw Brentford go into the penultimate game of the season three points outside the playoffs, having won only five of their last 15 games since "Warburtongate". Two wins in the final two games and favourable results elsewhere saw Warburton lead Brentford to fifth position and a place in the playoffs, the club's highest second-tier finish since the 1934–35 season. Brentford's 2014–15 season ended with a 5–1 aggregate defeat to Middlesbrough in the playoff semi-finals. Warburton used just 24 players in the 2014–15 season, the joint-fewest in the Football League. Warburton finished his Brentford managerial career with 40 wins, 16 draws, 22 losses and a winning percentage of 51.28%, the highest of any Brentford manager. He departed Griffin Park upon the expiry of his contract on 30 May.

It was later discovered that one reason for Warburton's departure was that he vetoed any incoming transfers during the 2015 January transfer window, only sanctioning the signing of an injured Lewis MacLeod.

=== Rangers ===
On 15 June 2015, Warburton was appointed manager of Scottish Championship club Rangers on a three-year contract. Weir, a former Rangers captain, was again appointed as his assistant. Warburton described his appointment as a "tremendous privilege". He led the Gers to a league and cup double with successes in the second tier Scottish Championship (promotion to the Scottish Premiership) and the Scottish Challenge Cup in his first season. Mark Warburton's first Old Firm victory came on 17 April 2016 in the Scottish Cup Semi-Final. After 90 minutes and extra time Rangers and Celtic were locked in at 2–2 (Kenny Miller and Barrie McKay on the scoresheet for Rangers), Rangers won 5–4 on penalties. Rangers progressed to the 2016 Scottish Cup Final, which they lost 3–2 to Hibernian.

On 12 July 2016, Warburton and Weir extended their contracts with Rangers by a further year. Rangers fell far behind in the 2016–17 Scottish Premiership title race, as Celtic moved 19 points clear after winning an Old Firm match on 31 December. According to a club statement, Warburton, Weir and head of recruitment Frank McParland resigned from their positions on 10 February 2017. Warburton told BBC Scotland that he had not resigned and would seek legal advice.

=== Nottingham Forest ===
On 14 March 2017, Warburton was appointed manager of Championship club Nottingham Forest on a two-and-a-half-year contract, with Weir once again as his assistant. His first game in charge was a 2–2 draw against Forest's local rivals Derby County at the City Ground, on 18 March 2017. Warburton was dismissed by Forest on New Year's Eve 2017, following a 1–0 home defeat by Sunderland. Forest were 14th in the league, having lost 14 games.

=== Queens Park Rangers ===
On 8 May 2019, Warburton was announced as manager of Queens Park Rangers on a two-year contract. He led QPR to victory against Stoke City in his first game in charge, becoming the first QPR manager to win his debut match since Neil Warnock in March 2010. On 28 April 2022, it was announced that Warburton would be leaving QPR at the end of his contract. Michael Beale formally took over as his successor on 1 June 2022.

== Other roles ==
=== Sporting director ===
Following an unsuccessful application to become Brentford manager, Warburton moved into the role of Sporting director in the summer of 2011, a new position created by an internal restructuring of the club. His role included dealing with agents, club finances and contracts, in addition to scouting young players and recommending them to the management. Warburton's links with the academy at Watford saw Brentford sign a number of players with Hornets connections, including loanees Dale Bennett, Adam Thompson, Rob Kiernan, Piero Mingoia, Lee Hodson and permanent transfers Harry Forrester and Jack Bonham. Warburton stated that the much-maligned Sporting Director/director of football position can work in English football, saying though he "would row every other day" with manager Uwe Rösler, the pair never fell out and Rösler had the final say on team selection and signings.

In December 2012, Warburton held talks with Premier League side West Bromwich Albion about filling the Sporting Director position, but Baggies chairman Jeremy Peace decided to look elsewhere. Warburton oversaw Brentford being awarded Category Two academy status in July 2013 and the opening of a new purpose-built facility on the grounds of Uxbridge High School four months later. In December 2013, Warburton was succeeded in his Sporting Director position by former Liverpool academy chief Frank McParland, whom he had heard of through former Liverpool and current Leicester manager Brendan Rodgers.

On 20 March 2025, Sporting Club Jacksonville, better known as Sporting JAX, an expansion franchise in United Soccer League (both USL Championship and USL Super League) named Warburton as sporting director and Head of Soccer.

=== NextGen Series ===
Warburton and sports TV producer Justin Andrews met in 2005, while working on the Inside Soccer project. The pair formed Cycad Sports Management in 2010 and through the company they launched the NextGen Series, an U19 club cup competition. Brentford owner Matthew Benham was also a backer of the competition. The inaugural tournament began in August 2011 and featured 16 teams, including European heavyweights Barcelona, Inter Milan, Sporting Lisbon, Ajax, Liverpool and Tottenham Hotspur. The tournament was expanded to 24 teams in 2012–13 and was won by Aston Villa. The 2013–14 tournament was cancelled in August 2013 due to a lack of funding and the emergence of the rival UEFA Youth League. While manager of Brentford, Warburton signed a number of players who had put in notable performances in the tournament, including João Carlos Teixeira and Betinho (Sporting Lisbon), Alex Pritchard (Tottenham Hotspur) and Chuba Akpom, Nico Yennaris and Jon Toral (Arsenal). In 2016, 19 year old Jordan Rossiter joined Rangers having previously appeared for Liverpool in the NextGen series as a 15 year old.

== Personal life ==
While at Enfield, Warburton became a trader in London and also worked in the United States. Looking back in 2014 on his time in the City, he said: "I was a currency dealer for the likes of Bank of America, AIG and RBS. I was getting up at 4:32 for 20-odd years, leave the house at 4:52, get the 5:02 train into Liverpool Street, at my desk at 5:45, getting home at 7pm and take phone calls through the night, orders from New York City. I was well paid, good at what I did. There was a lot of risk, a lot of pressure. My personal turnover would be £1.5 billion to £2 billion a day". Warburton cites parallels between trading and football management, including teamwork, communication, competition and man management.

His son Jack, was a youth player at Watford and Leicester City, before moving to Canada to play for USL Premier Development League side K-W United. He signed a six-month deal with Brentford's Development Squad in January 2015 and also represented Northern Ireland at U16 and U17 level.

== Managerial statistics ==
As of match played 7 May 2022

Managerial record by team and tenure
Team	From	To	Record				
Team	From	To	P	W	D	L	Win %
Brentford	10 December 2013	30 May 2015	78	40	16	22	51.3
Rangers	15 June 2015	10 February 2017	82	54	15	13	65.9
Nottingham Forest	14 March 2017	31 December 2017	37	15	3	19	40.5
Queens Park Rangers	8 May 2019	7 May 2022	150	56	35	59	37.3
Total			347	165	69	113	47.6

== Honours and achievements ==
=== Manager ===
Brentford

- Football League One runner-up: 2013–14

Rangers

- Scottish Championship: 2015–16
- Scottish Challenge Cup: 2015–16

Individual

- Football League Championship Manager of the Month: November 2014
- Football League One Manager of the Month: December 2013
- PFA Scotland Manager of the Year: 2015–16
- SPFL Manager of the Month (Championship): August 2015, September 2015, January 2016
- EFL Championship Manager of the Month: November 2021
