= 2014–15 Wycombe Wanderers F.C. season =

Wycombe Wanderers
2014–15 season
- Chairman: Andrew Howard
- Manager: Gareth Ainsworth
- Stadium: Adams Park
- League Two: 4th (play-off final)
- FA Cup: Second round (eliminated by AFC Wimbledon)
- League Cup: First round (eliminated by Millwall)
- Football League Trophy: First round (eliminated by Coventry City)
- Top goalscorer: League: Paul Hayes (14); All: Paul Hayes (15)
- Highest home attendance: 7,750 vs. Plymouth Argyle; 14 May 2015
- Lowest home attendance: 1,685 vs. Coventry City; 2 September 2014
Home colours	Away colours

The 2014–15 Football League Two was Wycombe Wanderers' 127th season in existence and their 21st season in the Football League. This page shows the statistics of the club's players in the season, and also lists all matches that the club played during the season.

Wycombe improved dramatically following the disappointing previous season and were strong throughout the campaign, constantly occupying one of the three automatic promotion places from September until the end of April.

Despite this, they fell just short in the race for automatic promotion, having to contest in the play-offs instead. Wycombe overcame Plymouth Argyle in the semi-finals, to book their place at Wembley Stadium for the first time in 21 years. In the final, however, Wycombe lost to Southend United in a penalty shoot-out.

== League data ==
=== League table ===
Pos	Team	Pld	W	D	L	GF	GA	GD	Pts	Promotion, qualification or relegation
2	Shrewsbury Town (P)	46	27	8	11	67	31	+36	89	Promotion to Football League One
3	Bury (P)	46	26	7	13	60	40	+20	85	Promotion to Football League One
4	Wycombe Wanderers	46	23	15	8	67	45	+22	84	Qualification for League Two play-offs (Note: Four teams play for one spot and promotion to Football League One.)
5	Southend United (O, P)	46	24	12	10	54	38	+16	84	Qualification for League Two play-offs
6	Stevenage	46	20	12	14	62	54	+8	72	Qualification for League Two play-offs

Updated to match(es) played on 23 May 2015. Source: BBC Sport
Rules for classification: 1) Points; 2) Goal difference; 3) Number of goals scored
(O) Play-off winners; (P) Promoted

=== Results summary ===
Overall								Home						Away					
Pld	W	D	L	GF	GA	GD	Pts	W	D	L	GF	GA	GD	W	D	L	GF	GA	GD
46	23	15	8	67	45	+22	84	10	7	6	30	25	+5	13	8	2	37	20	+17

Last updated: 8 May 2015.
Source: BBC Sport

=== Results by round ===
Round	1	2	3	4	5	6	7	8	9	10	11	12	13	14	15	16	17	18	19	20	21	22	23	24	25	26	27	28	29	30	31	32	33	34	35	36	37	38	39	40	41	42	43	44	45	46
Ground	A	H	H	A	A	H	H	A	A	H	H	A	H	A	H	A	H	A	A	H	A	H	A	H	H	A	A	H	A	H	H	A	H	A	A	H	H	A	A	H	A	H	H	A	H	A
Result	W	W	L	W	D	D	W	W	D	W	D	W	W	L	D	W	L	W	W	W	D	D	D	W	W	D	D	D	W	L	L	W	D	W	D	W	D	W	W	L	L	W	W	D	L	W
Position	2	2	7	5	5	5	4	3	3	2	2	1	1	1	2	1	3	1	1	1	1	2	2	1	1	1	1	3	2	3	3	3	3	3	3	2	3	3	3	3	3	3	3	3	5	4

Updated to match(es) played on 8 May 2015. Source:
A = Away; H = Home; W = Win; D = Draw; L = Loss

=== Scores overview ===
Wycombe Wanderers' score given first.

Opposition	Home Score	Away Score
Accrington Stanley	2–2	1–1
AFC Wimbledon	2–0	0–0
Burton Albion	1–3	0–1
Bury	0–0	1–1
Cambridge United	1–0	1–0
Carlisle United	3–1	3–2
Cheltenham Town	2–1	4–1
Dagenham & Redbridge	1–1	1–0
Exeter City	2–1	1–2
Hartlepool United	1–0	3–1
Luton Town	1–1	3–2
Mansfield Town	2–1	0–0
Morecambe	0–1	3–1
Newport County	1–2	2–0
Northampton Town	1–1	3–2
Oxford United	2–3	2–1
Plymouth Argyle	0–2	1–0
Portsmouth	0–0	1–1
Shrewsbury Town	1–0	1–1
Southend United	4–1	2–2
Stevenage	2–2	3–1
Tranmere Rovers	0–2	2–1
York City	1–0	0–0

== Match details ==
=== Legend ===
Win	Draw	Loss

=== Friendlies ===
12 July 2014 1	Cheshunt	2–3	Wycombe Wanderers	Cheshunt
13:00 BST	Adewunmi 61', 62'	Report	McClure 20', 23'; Barratt 87' (o.g.)	Stadium: Cheshunt Stadium

16 July 2014 2	Wycombe Wanderers	0–5	Chelsea	High Wycombe
19:45 BST		Report	Bamford 20'; Brown 48', 87'; Terry 52'; Ivanović 67'	Stadium: Adams Park; Attendance: 7,774

19 July 2014 3	West Bromwich Albion	0–0	Wycombe Wanderers	Birmingham
15:00 BST		Report		Stadium: Behind closed doors

22 July 2014 4	Chesham United	2–2	Wycombe Wanderers	Chesham
19:45 BST	Blake 24'; Bell 30'	Report	Jombati 33'; Kretzschmar 35'	Stadium: The Meadow

26 July 2014 5	Wycombe Wanderers	0–2	Reading	High Wycombe
15:00 BST		Report	Pogrebnyak 40'; Taylor 75'	Stadium: Adams Park; Attendance: 1,697

29 July 2014 6	Wealdstone	1–2	Wycombe Wanderers	Wealdstone
19:45 BST	Ahmed 84'	Report	McClure 47'; Wood 87'	Stadium: The Vale; Attendance: 260

2 August 2014 7	Barnet	0–1	Wycombe Wanderers	Barnet
15:00 BST		Report	Murphy 70'	Stadium: The Hive Stadium

=== League Two ===
The fixtures for the 2014–15 season were announced on 18 June 2014.

9 August 2014 1	Newport County	0–2	Wycombe Wanderers	Newport
15:00 BST		Report	Murphy 40'; Cowan-Hall 44'	Stadium: Rodney Parade; Attendance: 3,634; Referee: Peter Bankes

16 August 2014 2	Wycombe Wanderers	3–1	Carlisle United	High Wycombe
15:00 BST	Pierre 55'; Hayes 77' (pen.); Murphy 80'	Report	Potts 57'	Stadium: Adams Park; Attendance: 3,121; Referee: Charles Breakspear

19 August 2014 3	Wycombe Wanderers	0–2	Tranmere Rovers	High Wycombe
19:45 BST		Report	Stockton 19'; Power 54'	Stadium: Adams Park; Attendance: 3,005; Referee: Brendan Malone

23 August 2014 4	Stevenage	1–3	Wycombe Wanderers	Stevenage
15:00 BST	Charles 31'	Report	Hayes 40'; Murphy 44'; McClure 90'	Stadium: Broadhall Way; Attendance: 2,832; Referee: Kevin Wright

30 August 2014 5	York City	0–0	Wycombe Wanderers	York
15:00 BST		Report		Stadium: Bootham Crescent; Attendance: 3,209; Referee: Chris Kavanagh

6 September 2014 6	Wycombe Wanderers	0–0	Bury	High Wycombe
15:00 BST		Report		Stadium: Adams Park; Attendance: 3,483 (321 away); Referee: Kevin Johnson

13 September 2014 7	Wycombe Wanderers	2–1	Mansfield Town	High Wycombe
15:00 BST	Hayes 30' (pen.); Murphy 77'	Report	Rhead 4'	Stadium: Adams Park; Attendance: 3,106 (261 away); Referee: Darren Deadman

16 September 2014 8	Plymouth Argyle	0–1	Wycombe Wanderers	Plymouth
19:45 BST		Report	Hayes 36'	Stadium: Home Park; Attendance: 5,657; Referee: Lee Collins

20 September 2014 9	Portsmouth	1–1	Wycombe Wanderers	Portsmouth
15:00 BST	Ertl 70'	Report	Wood 50'	Stadium: Fratton Park; Attendance: 16,171 (729 away); Referee: Gary Sutton

27 September 2014 10	Wycombe Wanderers	1–0	Cambridge United	High Wycombe
15:00 BST	Hayes 63'	Report		Stadium: Adams Park; Attendance: 3,610 (418 away); Referee: Darren Handley

4 October 2014 11	Wycombe Wanderers	1–1	Northampton Town	High Wycombe
15:00 BST	Amadi-Holloway 90+8'	Report	Cresswell 31'	Stadium: Adams Park; Attendance: 3,822 (801 away); Referee: Pat Miller

11 October 2014 12	Morecambe	1–3	Wycombe Wanderers	Morecambe
15:00 BST	Fleming 45+3'	Report	Wood 10'; Hayes 15'; Jacobson 72'	Stadium: Globe Arena; Attendance: 1,710 (214 away); Referee: Phil Gibbs

18 October 2014 13	Wycombe Wanderers	2–0	AFC Wimbledon	High Wycombe
15:00 BST	Scowen 51'; Wood 70'	Report		Stadium: Adams Park; Attendance: 4,329 (896 away); Referee: Richard Clark

21 October 2014 14	Exeter City	2–1	Wycombe Wanderers	Exeter
19:45 BST	Wheeler 26'; Bennett 60'	Report	Murphy 7'	Stadium: St James Park; Attendance: 3,129 (192 away); Referee: Charles Breakspear

25 October 2014 15	Wycombe Wanderers	1–1	Dagenham & Redbridge	High Wycombe
15:00 BST	Murphy 83'	Report	Cureton 63'	Stadium: Adams Park; Attendance: 3,316 (127 away); Referee: Scott Mathieson

1 November 2014 16	Oxford United	1–2	Wycombe Wanderers	Oxford
15:00 GMT	Hylton 37' (pen.)	Report	Hayes 53'; Murphy 62'	Stadium: Kassam Stadium; Attendance: 7,552 (1,690 away); Referee: Tim Robinson

17 November 2014 17	Wycombe Wanderers	1–3	Burton Albion	High Wycombe
19:45 GMT	Hayes 65' (pen.)	BBC Report	Edwards 38'; MacDonald 49'; Blyth 68'	Stadium: Adams Park; Attendance: 3,981 (87 away); Referee: Graham Scott

22 November 2014 18	Cheltenham Town	1–4	Wycombe Wanderers	Cheltenham
15:00 GMT	Elliott 3'	Report	Cowan-Hall 4'; Craig 37'; Jacobson 70'; McClure 90'	Stadium: Whaddon Road; Attendance: 2,833 (496 away); Referee: Darren Sheldrake

29 November 2014 19	Hartlepool United	1–3	Wycombe Wanderers	Hartlepool
15:00 GMT	Harewood 84'	Report	Cowan-Hall 33'; Bloomfield 76'; Mawson 79'	Stadium: Victoria Park; Attendance: 3,053 (163 away); Referee: Jeremy Simpson

13 December 2014 20	Wycombe Wanderers	4–1	Southend United	High Wycombe
15:00 GMT	Cowan-Hall 32'; McClure 45+1', 72'; Jacobson 67'	Report	Payne 2'	Stadium: Adams Park; Attendance: 4,123 (1,089 away); Referee: Graham Horwood

20 December 2014 21	Accrington Stanley	1–1	Wycombe Wanderers	Accrington
15:00 GMT	Maguire 49'	Report	Cowan-Hall 9'	Stadium: Crown Ground; Attendance: 1,325 (185 away); Referee: Lee Probert

26 December 2014 22	Wycombe Wanderers	1–1	Luton Town	High Wycombe
15:00 GMT	Cowan-Hall 3'	Report	Smith 8'	Stadium: Adams Park; Attendance: 7,539 (2,566 away); Referee: Andy Woolmer

28 December 2014 23	Shrewsbury Town	0–0	Wycombe Wanderers	Shrewsbury
15:00 GMT		Report		Stadium: New Meadow; Attendance: 7,239 (475 away); Referee: Mark Clattenburg

3 January 2014 24	Wycombe Wanderers	1–0	Hartlepool	High Wycombe
15:00 GMT	Onyedinma 37'	Report		Stadium: Adams Park; Attendance: 3,607 (136 away); Referee: Darren Deadman

10 January 2014 25	Wycombe Wanderers	1–0	York City	High Wycombe
15:00 GMT	Onyedinma 47'	Report		Stadium: Adams Park; Attendance: 3,669 (324 away); Referee: Oliver Langford

17 January 2015 26	Bury	1–1	Wycombe Wanderers	Bury
15:00 GMT	Mayor 32'	Report	Onyedinma 68'	Stadium: Gigg Lane; Attendance: 2,932 (270 away); Referee: David Webb

24 January 2015 27	Mansfield Town	0–0	Wycombe Wanderers	Mansfield
15:00 GMT		Report		Stadium: Field Mill; Attendance: 2,759; Referee: Eddie Ilderton

31 January 2015 28	Wycombe Wanderers	0–0	Portsmouth	High Wycombe
15:00 BST		Report		Stadium: Adams Park; Attendance: 5,829; Referee: Andy D'Urso

7 February 2015 29	Cambridge United	0–1	Wycombe Wanderers	Cambridge
15:00 GMT		Report	Ephraim 53'	Stadium: Abbey Stadium; Attendance: 6,894 (701 away); Referee: Andy Davies

10 February 2015 30	Wycombe Wanderers	0–2	Plymouth Argyle	High Wycombe
19:45 GMT		Report	Alessandra 19'; Hartley 29'	Stadium: Adams Park; Attendance: 3,078 (522 away); Referee: Mark Brown

14 February 2015 31	Wycombe Wanderers	1–2	Newport County	High Wycombe
15:00 GMT	Onyedinma 55'	Report	Klukowski 20' 79'	Stadium: Adams Park; Attendance: 3,196; Referee: Michael Bull

21 February 2015 32	Carlisle United	2–3	Wycombe Wanderers	Carlisle
15:00 GMT	Dempsey 67'; Grainger 82' (pen.)	Report	Pierre 28'; Onyedinma 62'; McClure 65'	Stadium: Brunton Park; Attendance: 4,021 (184 away); Referee: Darren Handley

28 February 2015 33	Wycombe Wanderers	2–2	Stevenage	High Wycombe
15:00 GMT	Onyedinma 10', 71'	Report	Pett 30'; Parrett 45+4'	Stadium: Adams Park; Attendance: 3,664 (416 away); Referee: Jeremy Simpson

3 March 2015 34	Tranmere Rovers	1–2	Wycombe Wanderers	Birkenhead
19:45 GMT	Hugill 32'	Report	Hayes 26' (pen.); Onyedinma 40'	Stadium: Prenton Park; Attendance: 4,161 (165 away); Referee: Mark Heywood

7 March 2015 35	Southend United	2–2	Wycombe Wanderers	Southend-on-Sea
15:00 GMT	Corr 14', 60'	Report	Craig 28'; Mawson 85'	Stadium: Roots Hall; Attendance: 6,204 (720 away); Referee: Tim Robinson

14 March 2015 36	Wycombe Wanderers	1–0	Shrewsbury Town	High Wycombe
15:00 GMT	Wood 1'	Report		Stadium: Adams Park; Attendance: 4,697 (719 away); Referee: Graham Scott

17 March 2015 37	Wycombe Wanderers	2–2	Accrington Stanley	High Wycombe
19:45 GMT	Wood 30'; Mawson 70'	Report	Gornell 45'; Mingoia 61'	Stadium: Adams Park; Attendance: 2,621 (31 away); Referee: Stephen Martin

24 March 2015 38	Luton Town	2–3	Wycombe Wanderers	Luton
19:45 GMT	Lee 7', 38'	Report	Franks 3' (o.g.); Hayes 22' (pen.); Mawson 31'	Stadium: Kenilworth Road; Attendance: 8,379 (555 away); Referee: David Coote

28 March 2015 39	Dagenham & Redbridge	0–1	Wycombe Wanderers	London
15:00 GMT		Report	Pierre 64'	Stadium: Victoria Road; Attendance: 2,362 (788 away); Referee: Geoff Eltringham

3 April 2015 40	Wycombe Wanderers	2–3	Oxford United	High Wycombe
15:00 BST	Hayes 48'; Amadi-Holloway 89'	Report	Roofe 11' 60'; Rose 22'	Stadium: Adams Park; Attendance: 6,892 (1,571 away); Referee: Oliver Langford

6 April 2015 41	Burton Albion	1–0	Wycombe Wanderers	Burton-upon-Trent
15:00 BST	McGurk 55'	Report		Stadium: Pirelli Stadium; Attendance: 4,284 (868 away); Referee: Darren Deadman

11 April 2015 42	Wycombe Wanderers	2–1	Cheltenham Town	High Wycombe
15:00 BST	Pierre 45+2'; Mawson 56'	Report	Berry 54'	Stadium: Adams Park; Attendance: 3,907 (273 away); Referee: Tony Harrington

14 April 2015 43	Wycombe Wanderers	2–1	Exeter City	High Wycombe
19:45 BST	Saunders 7'; Hayes 90+12' (pen.)	Report	Sercombe 76'	Stadium: Adams Park; Attendance: 3,245 (284 away); Referee: Iain Williamson

18 April 2015 44	AFC Wimbledon	0–0	Wycombe Wanderers	Kingston upon Thames
15:00 BST		Report		Stadium: Kingsmeadow; Attendance: 4,535 (845 away); Referee: Trevor Kettle

25 April 2015 45	Wycombe Wanderers	0–1	Morecambe	High Wycombe
15:00 BST		Report	Mullin 86'	Stadium: Adams Park; Attendance: 5,177 (91 away); Referee: Lee Collins

2 May 2015 46	Northampton Town	2–3	Wycombe Wanderers	Northampton
15:00 BST	Wood 67' (o.g.); Cresswell 85'	Report	Amadi-Holloway 36'; Yennaris 39'; Mawson 90+7'	Stadium: Sixfields Stadium; Attendance: 5,723 (916 away); Referee: Eddie Ilderton

==== League Two play-offs ====
9 May 2015 Semi-final 1	Plymouth Argyle	2–3	Wycombe Wanderers	Plymouth
19:45 BST	Ansah 86'; Banton 89'	Report	Hayes 10'; Amadi-Holloway 22'; Craig 52'	Stadium: Home Park; Attendance: 14,175 (813 away); Referee: Peter Bankes

14 May 2015 Semi-final 2	Wycombe Wanderers	2–1 (5–3 agg.)	Plymouth Argyle	High Wycombe
19:45 BST	Hayes 8'; Mawson 35'	Report	Brunt 71'	Stadium: Adams Park; Attendance: 7,750 (2,028 away); Referee: Nigel Miller

23 May 2015 Final	Wycombe Wanderers	1–1 (6–7 p)	Southend United	London
17:30 BST	Bentley 95' (o.g.)	Report	Pigott 120+2'	Stadium: Wembley Stadium; Attendance: 38,252; Referee: Simon Hooper
	Penalties
	Murphy (penalty scored); Mawson (penalty scored); Hayes (penalty scored); Bloomfield (penalty missed); Bean (penalty scored); Jacobson (penalty scored); Amadi-Holloway (penalty scored); Wood (penalty missed)		Pigott (penalty scored); Coker (penalty missed); Leonard (penalty scored); Payne (penalty scored); Timlin (penalty scored); Barrett (penalty scored); Weston (penalty scored); Bolger (penalty scored)

=== FA Cup ===
8 November 2014 1	Barnet	1–3	Wycombe Wanderers	Barnet
15:00 GMT	Akinde 3'	Report	Hayes 34' (pen.); Pierre 59'; Wood 74'	Stadium: The Hive; Attendance: 2,410; Referee: Oliver Langford

7 December 2014 2	Wycombe Wanderers	0–1	AFC Wimbledon	High Wycombe
14:00 GMT		Report	Rigg 56'	Stadium: Adams Park; Attendance: 3,196 (1,035 away); Referee: Chris Kavanagh

=== League Cup ===
12 August 2014 1	Millwall	1–0	Wycombe Wanderers	London
19:45 BST	Briggs 27'	Report		Stadium: The Den; Attendance: 3,403; Referee: Andy D'Urso

=== Football League Trophy ===
2 September 2014 1	Wycombe Wanderers	0–1	Coventry City	High Wycombe
19:45 BST		Report	McQuoid 66'	Stadium: Adams Park; Attendance: 1,685 (520 away); Referee: Mick Russell

== Squad statistics ==
=== Appearances and goals ===
As of 24 May 2015

No.	Pos	Nat	Player	Total		League Two		FA Cup		League Cup		League Trophy	
No.	Pos	Nat	Player	Apps	Goals	Apps	Goals	Apps	Goals	Apps	Goals	Apps	Goals
1	GK	(England) ENG	Matt Ingram	50	0	46	0	2	0	1	0	1	0
2	DF	(Portugal) POR	Sido Jombati	40	0	36	0	2	0	1	0	1	0
3	DF	(Wales) WAL	Joe Jacobson	49	3	45	3	2	0	1	0	1	0
4	DF	(China) CHN	Nico Yennaris	16	1	16	1	0	0	0	0	0	0
6	DF	(England) ENG	Aaron Pierre	49	5	45	4	2	1	1	0	1	0
7	MF	(England) ENG	Sam Saunders	13	1	13	1	0	0	0	0	0	0
8	MF	(Jamaica) JAM	Marcus Bean	19	0	19	0	0	0	0	0	0	0
9	FW	(England) ENG	Paul Hayes	44	15	41	14	2	1	1	0	0	0
10	MF	(England) ENG	Matt Bloomfield	40	1	36	1	2	0	1	0	1	0
11	MF	(England) ENG	Sam Wood	50	6	47	5	2	1	1	0	0	0
12	FW	(Scotland) SCO	Steven Craig	35	4	32	4	1	0	1	0	1	0
15	DF	(England) ENG	Peter Murphy	47	7	44	7	2	0	1	0	0	0
16	DF	(England) ENG	Tommy Fletcher	0	0	0	0	0	0	0	0	0	0
18	DF	(England) ENG	Daniel Rowe	16	0	15	0	0	0	0	0	1	0
19	FW	(Northern Ireland) NIR	Matt McClure	31	5	27	5	2	0	1	0	1	0
20	GK	(England) ENG	Charlie Horlock	0	0	0	0	0	0	0	0	0	0
21	GK	(England) ENG	Alex Lynch	4	0	4	0	0	0	0	0	0	0
22	MF	(England) ENG	Max Kretzschmar	20	0	16	0	2	0	1	0	1	0
23	FW	(Nigeria) NGA	Fred Onyedinma	24	8	24	8	0	0	0	0	0	0
24	MF	(England) ENG	Nathan Evans	0	0	0	0	0	0	0	0	0	0
25	FW	(Wales) WAL	Aaron Amadi-Holloway	34	4	31	4	1	0	1	0	1	0
26	DF	(England) ENG	Alfie Mawson	49	7	47	7	0	0	1	0	1	0
27	FW	(England) ENG	Courtney Senior	2	0	2	0	0	0	0	0	0	0
31	FW	(England) ENG	Hogan Ephraim	19	1	17	1	2	0	0	0	0	0
Players who left the club before the end of the season:
4	MF	(England) ENG	Josh Scowen	20	1	18	1	2	0	0	0	0	0
7	FW	(England) ENG	Paris Cowan-Hall	23	6	20	6	1	0	1	0	1	0
8	MF	(England) ENG	Stuart Lewis	8	0	6	0	1	0	0	0	1	0

=== Goalscorers ===
Goals	Name	League Two	FA Cup	League Cup	League Trophy	Total
15	Paul Hayes	14	1	0	0	15
8	Fred Onyedinma	8	0	0	0	8
7	Alfie Mawson	7	0	0	0	7
=	Peter Murphy	7	0	0	0	7
6	Paris Cowan-Hall *	6	0	0	0	6
=	Sam Wood	5	1	0	0	6
5	Matt McClure	5	0	0	0	5
=	Aaron Pierre	4	1	0	0	5
4	Aaron Amadi-Holloway	4	0	0	0	4
3	Steven Craig	3	0	0	0	3
=	Joe Jacobson	3	0	0	0	3
1	Matt Bloomfield	1	0	0	0	1
=	Hogan Ephraim	1	0	0	0	1
=	Sam Saunders	1	0	0	0	1
=	Josh Scowen *	1	0	0	0	1
=	Nico Yennaris	1	0	0	0	1
=	Own goals	2	0	0	0	2
TOTALS		73	3	0	0	76

- Paris Cowan-Hall and Josh Scowen left the club before the end of the season.

=== Disciplinary record ===
Number	Position	Name	League Two		FA Cup		League Cup		League Trophy		Total	
Number	Position	Name	Booked	Sent off (straight red)	Booked	Sent off (straight red)	Booked	Sent off (straight red)	Booked	Sent off (straight red)	Booked	Sent off (straight red)
2	DF	Sido Jombati	4	0	0	0	0	0	0	0	4	0
3	DF	Joe Jacobson	9	0	0	0	0	0	0	0	9	0
4	MF	Josh Scowen	6	0	1	0	0	0	0	0	7	0
4	MF	Nico Yennaris	1	0	0	0	0	0	0	0	1	0
6	DF	Aaron Pierre	11	1	2	0	0	0	0	0	13	1
7	FW	Paris Cowan-Hall	4	0	0	0	1	0	0	0	5	0
7	MF	Sam Saunders	5	0	0	0	0	0	0	0	5	0
8	MF	Marcus Bean	2	0	0	0	0	0	0	0	2	0
8	MF	Stuart Lewis	2	0	0	0	0	0	0	0	2	0
9	FW	Paul Hayes	4	0	0	0	0	0	0	0	4	0
10	MF	Matt Bloomfield	5	0	0	0	0	0	0	0	5	0
11	MF	Sam Wood	7	0	0	0	0	0	0	0	7	0
12	FW	Steven Craig	3	0	0	0	0	0	0	0	3	0
15	DF	Peter Murphy	4	0	1	0	0	0	0	0	5	0
18	MF	Daniel Rowe	1	0	0	0	0	0	1	0	2	0
19	FW	Matt McClure	0	1	0	0	0	0	0	0	0	1
22	MF	Max Kretzschmar	2	0	0	0	0	0	0	0	2	0
23	FW	Fred Onyedinma	1	0	0	0	0	0	0	0	1	0
25	FW	Aaron Amadi-Holloway	1	0	0	0	0	0	0	0	1	0
26	DF	Alfie Mawson	8	0	0	0	0	0	0	0	8	0
31	FW	Hogan Ephraim	1	0	0	0	0	0	0	0	1	0
TOTALS			72	2	4	0	1	0	1	0	78	2

== Transfers ==
=== In ===
Players transferred in
Date	Pos.	Name	From	Fee	Ref.
14 May 2014	FW	Paul Hayes	(England) Scunthorpe United	Free Transfer	
16 May 2014	DF	Aaron Pierre	(England) Brentford	Free Transfer	
23 May 2014	DF	Sido Jombati	(England) Cheltenham Town	Free Transfer	
20 June 2014	DF	Peter Murphy	(England) Accrington Stanley	Free Transfer	
1 July 2014	DF	Joe Jacobson	(England) Shrewsbury Town	Free Transfer	
2 July 2014	GK	Alex Lynch	(England) Peterborough United	Free Transfer	
2 July 2014	MF	Nathan Evans	Free Agent	Free Transfer	
9 August 2014	FW	Aaron Amadi-Holloway	(Wales) Newport County	Free Transfer	
28 October 2014	FW	Hogan Ephraim	Free Agent	Free Transfer	
9 January 2015	MF	Marcus Bean	(England) Colchester United	Free Transfer	

=== Out ===
Players transferred out
Date	Pos.	Name	To	Fee	Ref.
14 May 2014	DF	Leon Johnson	Free Agent	Contract Expiry	
14 May 2014	MF	Lee Angol	(England) Luton Town	Contract Expiry	
14 May 2014	MF	Jesse Kewley-Graham	(England) Hampton & Richmond Borough	Contract Expiry	
14 May 2014	FW	Jo Kuffour	(England) Sutton United	Contract Expiry	
14 May 2014	MF	Anthony Jeffrey	(England) Boreham Wood	Contract Expiry	
14 May 2014	FW	Dean Morgan	(England) Woking	Contract Expiry	
14 May 2014	FW	Jon-Paul Pittman	(England) Grimsby Town	Contract Expiry	
14 May 2014	MF	Matt Spring	(England) St. Neots Town	Contract Expiry	
9 June 2014	DF	Marvin McCoy	(England) York City	Free Transfer	
1 September 2014	FW	Junior Morias	(England) Boreham Wood	Released	
18 December 2014	DF	Gary Doherty	—N/a	Retired	
1 January 2015	FW	Paris Cowan-Hall	(England) Millwall	Undisclosed	
6 January 2015	DF	Anthony Stewart	(England) Crewe Alexandra	Free Transfer	
7 January 2015	MF	Stuart Lewis	(England) Ebbsfleet United	Free Transfer	
15 January 2015	MF	Josh Scowen	(England) Barnsley	Undisclosed	

=== Loaned in ===
Players loaned in
Date	Pos.	Name	From	End date	Ref.
31 July 2014	MF	(England) Nicky Walker	(England) Rotherham United	4 November 2014	
31 July 2014	DF	(England) Daniel Rowe	(England) Rotherham United	27 September 2014	
9 August 2014	DF	(England) Alfie Mawson	(England) Brentford	30 June 2015	
18 October 2014	DF	(England) Daniel Rowe	(England) Rotherham United	30 June 2015	
27 November 2014	FW	(Nigeria) Fred Onyedinma	(England) Millwall	30 June 2015	
10 January 2015	FW	(England) Courtney Senior	(England) Brentford	11 February 2015	
27 February 2015	MF	(England) Sam Saunders	(England) Brentford	30 June 2015	
27 February 2015	DF	(China) Nico Yennaris	(England) Brentford	30 June 2015	

=== Loaned out ===
Players loaned out
Date	Pos.	Name	From	End date	Ref.
6 August 2014	DF	(England) Tommy Fletcher	(England) Chesham United	9 November 2014	
7 August 2014	GK	(England) Charlie Horlock	(England) Harrow Borough	7 September 2014	
7 August 2014	GK	(England) Alex Lynch	(England) Hayes & Yeading	7 September 2014	
6 October 2014	MF	(England) Nathan Evans	(England) Scarborough Athletic	3 January 2015	
27 November 2014	DF	(England) Anthony Stewart	(England) Crewe Alexandra	5 January 2015	
