= Matt McClure (footballer) =

Footballer (born 1981)

Personal information
- Full name: Matthew Glen McClure
- Date of birth: 17 November 1991 (age 34)
- Place of birth: Slough, England
- Height: 1.78 m (5 ft 10 in)
- Position: Striker

Team information
- Current team: Chesham United

Youth career
- Crystal Palace
- 2008–2010: Wycombe Wanderers

Senior career*
Years	Team	Apps	(Gls)
2009–2015	Wycombe Wanderers	110	(24)
2009	→ Burnham (loan)	1	(3)
2010	→ Wealdstone (loan)	8	(4)
2011	→ Hayes & Yeading United (loan)	1	(1)
2015–2016	Dagenham & Redbridge	20	(4)
2016–2019	Aldershot Town	103	(19)
2019–2020	Maidstone United	15	(8)
2020–2023	Gloucester City	71	(34)
2023–2025	Chippenham Town	98	(23)
2025–	Chesham United	0	(0)

International career
- Northern Ireland U19
2012	Northern Ireland U21	2	(1)
- * Club domestic league appearances and goals as of 16:52, 22 June 2025 (UTC)

Matthew Glen McClure (born 17 November 1991) is a semi-professional footballer who plays as a striker for National League South club Chesham United. Born in England, he has represented Northern Ireland at under-21 and under-19 level.

== Club career ==
McClure started his career in the Wycombe Wanderers youth team and had spells at Burnham and Wealdstone on work experience deals during the 2009–10 season. He made his Wycombe first team debut as a late substitute against Shrewsbury Town on 25 September 2010. On 12 August 2011 McClure joined Hayes & Yeading on a month's loan. He scored nine minutes into his debut against Alfreton Town, but later suffered a dislocated ankle, leaving him out of action for several months. After returning from injury, McClure scored his first professional goal for Wycombe in a 4–1 defeat to Scunthorpe United on 3 March 2012.

On 20 November 2012, McClure scored two goals as Wycombe beat Rotherham United 3–2 at the New York Stadium. The following week he scored 2 more goals in a 3–0 home win against Burton Albion.

On 15 December 2012, McClure scored Wycombe's second goal in a 2–0 win over Accrington Stanley. Later in the match he was sent off for a second bookable offence.

On 3 March 2015, McClure came on as a substitute in the 68th minute in place of Sam Saunders in an eventual 2–1 away win at Tranmere Rovers, but was given a straight red card 70 seconds after coming on for elbowing Adam Dugdale. Later that year he was released by Wycombe.

On 16 July 2015, McClure signed for fellow League 2 side Dagenham & Redbridge.

In April 2019, he was released by Aldershot Town.

After a spell at Maidstone United McClure moved to Gloucester City in January 2020. Matt made his debut for City in a 2–1 loss away to Guiseley on 18 January 2020. During the remainder of the 2019–20 season, he made six more appearances, scoring two goals.

In January 2023, McClure joined Chippenham Town.

In June 2025, McClure joined National League South side Chesham United.

== International career ==
McClure made his debut for the Northern Ireland under-19 team against Switzerland in April 2009. He received his first call-up to the Northern Ireland under-21 squad on 3 May 2012, for the European U21 Championship qualifier against Macedonia, and made his debut on 10 May 2012 as an 86th-minute substitute.

== Career statistics ==
As of match played 19 March 2022

Appearances and goals by club, season and competition
Club	Season	League			FA Cup		League Cup		Other		Total	
Club	Season	Division	Apps	Goals	Apps	Goals	Apps	Goals	Apps	Goals	Apps	Goals
Wycombe Wanderers	2009–10	League One	0	0	0	0	0	0	0	0	0	0
Wycombe Wanderers	2010–11	League Two	8	0	1	0	0	0	2 (Note: Appearances in Football League Trophy)	0	11	0
Wycombe Wanderers	2011–12	League One	12	1	0	0	0	0	0	0	12	1
Wycombe Wanderers	2012–13	League Two	27	11	0	0	0	0	1	0	28	11
Wycombe Wanderers	2013–14	League Two	36	7	3	0	0	0	2	2	41	9
Wycombe Wanderers	2014–15	League Two	27	5	2	0	1	0	2 (Note: One appearance in League Two play-offs, one in Football League Trophy)	0	32	5
Wycombe Wanderers	Total		110	24	6	0	1	0	7	2	124	26
Burnham (loan)	2009–10	SL Division One Midlands	1	0	—		—		—		1	0
Wealdstone (loan)	2009–10	IL Premier Division	8	4	—		—		—		8	4
Hayes & Yeading United (loan)	2011–12	Conference Premier	1	1	—		—		—		1	1
Dagenham & Redbridge	2015–16	League Two	20	4	1	0	1	0	2	1	24	5
Aldershot Town	2016–17	National League	39	9	1	0	—		4 (Note: Two appearances and one goal in FA Trophy, two appearances in National League play-offs)	1	44	10
Aldershot Town	2017–18	National League	35	5	1	0	—		1 (Note: Appearance(s) in the National League play-offs)	0	37	5
Aldershot Town	2018–19	National League	26	4	3	0	—		1 (Note: Appearance(s) in the FA Trophy)	0	24	2
Aldershot Town	Total		100	18	5	0	—		6	1	111	19
Maidstone United	2019–20	National League South	15	8	4	1	—		3	1	22	10
Gloucester City	2019–20	National League North	7	2	—		—		—		7	2
Gloucester City	2020–21	National League North	14	12	1	0	—		2	1	17	13
Gloucester City	2021–22	National League North	19	6	1	0	—		1	0	21	6
Gloucester City	Total		40	20	2	0	—		3	1	45	21
Career total			295	79	18	1	2	0	21	6	336	88
