= Alfie Mawson =

English footballer (born 1994)

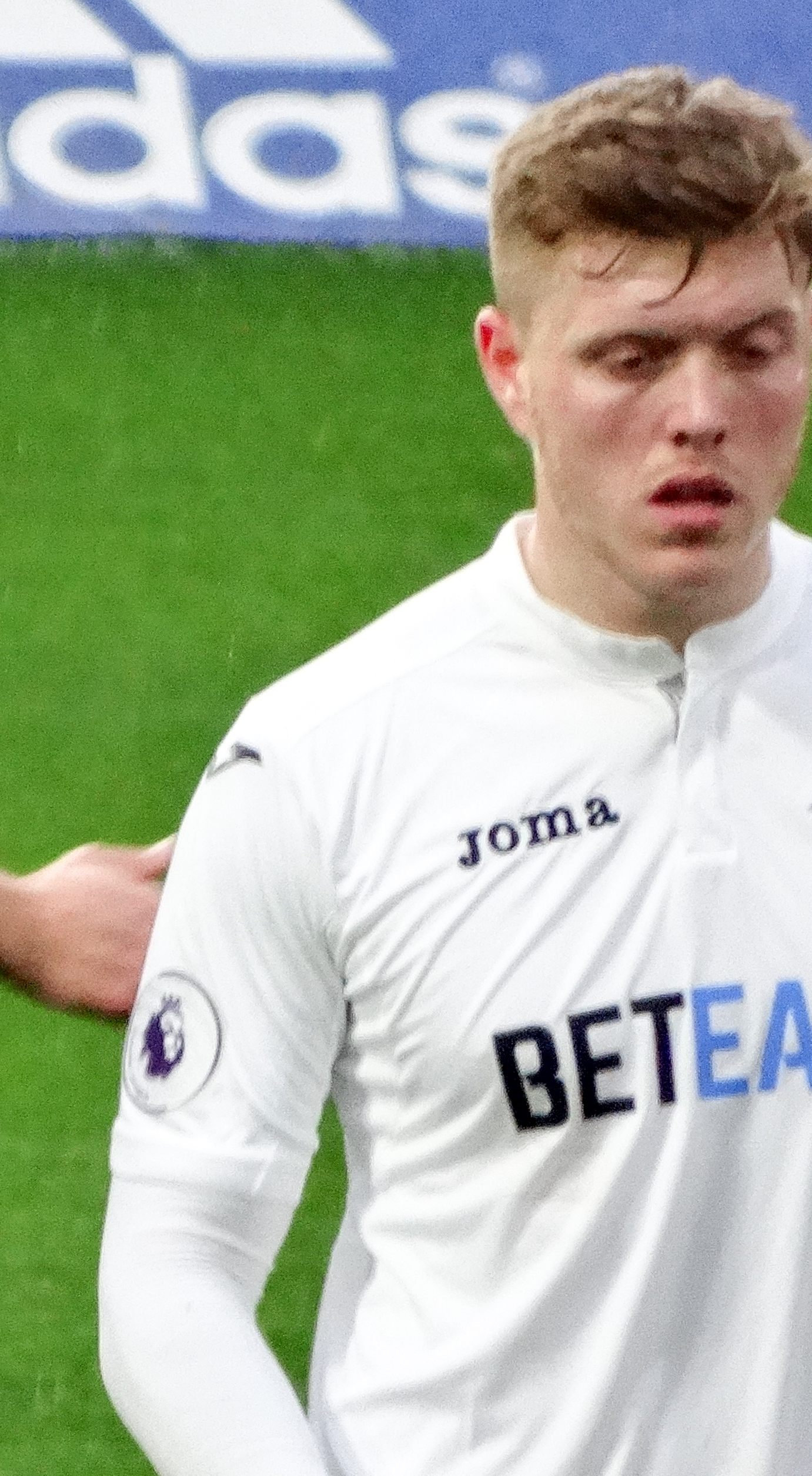
- Mawson playing for Swansea City in 2017

Personal information
- Full name: Alfie Robert John Mawson
- Date of birth: 19 January 1994 (age 32)
- Place of birth: Hillingdon, England
- Height: 6 ft 2 in (1.88 m)
- Position: Centre back

Youth career
- 2003–2009: Reading
- 2010–2012: Brentford

Senior career*
Years	Team	Apps	(Gls)
2012–2015	Brentford	0	(0)
2012–2013	→ Maidenhead United (loan)	6	(0)
2013	→ Maidenhead United (loan)	3	(0)
2013	→ Maidenhead United (loan)	3	(0)
2013–2014	→ Luton Town (loan)	1	(0)
2014	→ Welling United (loan)	9	(1)
2014–2015	→ Wycombe Wanderers (loan)	45	(6)
2015–2016	Barnsley	49	(8)
2016–2018	Swansea City	65	(6)
2018–2022	Fulham	48	(0)
2020–2021	→ Bristol City (loan)	11	(0)
2022–2023	Wycombe Wanderers	20	(0)
Total		260	(21)

International career
2016–2017	England U21	6	(1)
2018	England	0	(0)
- * Club domestic league appearances and goals

Alfie Robert John Mawson (born 19 January 1994) is an English former professional footballer who played as a centre back.

He started his senior career with Brentford from the youth ranks but spent his entire time on loan with four clubs, including three loan spells with Maidenhead United and winning the League Two Player of the Year award with Wycombe Wanderers in 2015. He was transferred to Barnsley after failing to record a League appearance with Brentford, and made 49 appearances during the one season there, helping the former to win promotion to the Championship. He signed for Premier League club Swansea City in 2016, and his second season there he featured in every Premier League match of the campaign but could not prevent the team from relegation.

Mawson made six appearances for the England under-21 team and was called up for the England squad in March 2018 but did not play in the two friendlies.

== Early life ==
Mawson was born and raised in Hillingdon, London.

== Club career ==
=== Early career ===
A centre back, Mawson joined the Reading academy at the age of nine. He remained with the club until his release at age 15 and subsequently had unsuccessful trials with AFC Bournemouth and Millwall.

=== Brentford ===
Mawson joined Brentford in the summer of 2010 on a two-year scholarship. He played for the youth team during the 2010–11 season and progressed into the Development Squad during the 2011–12 season, making nine appearances. He also took over the youth team captaincy during the latter part of the season. In April 2012, Mawson signed a two-year professional contract at Brentford. He was included in the squad for the Bees' pre-season tour of Germany in July 2012 and appeared in the opening match against ZFC Meuselwitz. Mawson suffered an injury-hit 2012–13 season and managed only 12 Development Squad appearances.

Mawson made his professional debut in a 5–0 League Cup second round defeat at Derby County in August 2013, replacing Sam Saunders after 73 minutes. He scored his first goal of the 2013–14 season with the opener in a 1–1 Professional Development League 2 South draw with Brighton & Hove Albion on 16 September 2013. He scored his second goal in a 4–1 defeat to Ipswich Town on 26 November and his third in the return fixture against Brighton & Hove Albion on 27 January 2014. Mawson made 12 appearances and scored three goals for the Development Squad during the 2013–14 season, in addition to making one first-team appearance. A torn meniscus in a Development Squad match ended Mawson's season early, prompting him to contemplate quitting football, before signing a new one-year deal on 5 June 2014. Mawson spent the entire 2014–15 season away on loan and after excelling, he was offered a new two-year contract in April 2015. He turned the deal down and departed Griffin Park when his contract expired on 30 June. An undisclosed compensation fee was agreed in February 2016.

==== Maidenhead United (loans) ====
Mawson signed for Conference South club Maidenhead United on 13 December 2012 on a one-month loan, earning praise from manager Johnson Hippolyte for his performance on his debut in a 1–0 win against Truro City. Mawson returned to Brentford on 9 January 2013, before re-signing for Maidenhead United on loan for the rest of the season on 21 February. He made nine appearances during the 2012–13 season as Maidenhead narrowly avoided relegation. Mawson rejoined Maidenhead United for a third loan spell on 4 October 2013, which ran initially until 29 October and was later extended until 4 January 2014. Mawson was recalled from his loan early on 28 November after four appearances.

==== Luton Town (loan) ====
On 28 November 2013, Mawson moved on loan to Conference Premier club Luton Town until 4 January 2014, to cover for injuries to defenders Steve McNulty, Andy Parry, Alex Lacey and Anthony Charles. He made his debut in a 5–0 away league victory over Alfreton Town on 7 December, but was substituted for Joe Davis at half time due to an injury. He returned to Brentford on 10 January after making just one appearance.

==== Welling United (loan) ====
On 31 January 2014, Mawson joined Conference Premier club Welling United on loan until the end of the 2013–14 season. He made his debut with a start in a 1–1 draw away to Tamworth on 22 February. Mawson scored his first Wings goal on his second appearance, heading home the second in a 2–0 home win over Gateshead on 25 February. A knee injury disrupted Mawson's time at Welling and he returned to Brentford at the end of the season, having made 9 appearances and scored one goal.

==== Wycombe Wanderers (loan) ====
Mawson joined League Two club Wycombe Wanderers on 9 August 2014 on a one-month youth loan, as cover for the injured Gary Doherty. He made his Wycombe debut (the first Football League appearance of his career) on the opening day of the 2014–15 season, playing the full 90 minutes of a 2–0 away win over Newport County alongside former Brentford teammate Aaron Pierre at centre back. After appearing in each of Wycombe's first six matches of the season, Mawson's loan was extended until 1 January 2015. Mawson's 100% appearance record came to an end on his 19th appearance of the season, after suffering an injury in a 3–1 defeat to Burton Albion on 17 November. He returned to action on 29 November against Hartlepool United and capped Wycombe's afternoon with the first Football League goal of his career in a 3–1 victory. His performance won him a place in the Football League Team of the Week.

On 3 January 2015, Mawson's loan was extended until the end of the season, including the play-offs if required, with no recall clause. Mawson's three goals in four matches in March helped ensure Wycombe held onto the third automatic promotion place. He scored a vital winning goal in Wycombe's 2–1 victory over Cheltenham Town on 11 April, to end a run of successive defeats, which kept Wycombe four points clear of fourth-place Bury. Mawson's performance was recognised with his second inclusion of the season in the Football League Team of the Week. Mawson's 97th-minute winner in a 3–2 victory over Northampton Town on the final day was not enough to prevent Wycombe from having to settle for fourth place and a play-off semi-final matchup versus Plymouth Argyle. However, his season ended in disappointment after a penalty shoot-out defeat to Southend United in the final. He finished the 2014–15 season with 50 appearances and seven goals. Mawson swept the board at Wycombe's end-of-season awards ceremony, winning the Supporters' and Players' Player of the Year awards, in addition to the Official Wycombe Wanderers Supporters Association's Player, Young Player and Away Travel Player of the Year awards. He also won the Wycombe Wanderers Independent Supporters' Club Player of the Year award. He finished third in the running for the League Two Player of the Year award.

=== Barnsley ===
Mawson signed for League One club Barnsley on 30 June 2015 on a three-year contract. He scored his first goal for the Reds in a 3–2 away win over Millwall. He impressed in the 2015–16 season, scoring seven goals in 58 appearances. He played a big part in Barnsley's season, including beating Oxford United 3–2 to win the Football League Trophy on 3 April 2016, and in earning promotion to the Championship after beating Millwall 3–1 in the play-off final.

=== Swansea City ===
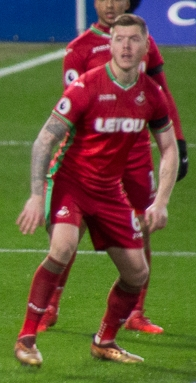
Mawson playing for Swansea City in 2017

After just four league matches experience in the Championship with Barnsley, Mawson signed for Premier League club Swansea City on 30 August 2016 on a four-year contract for an undisclosed fee. He made his full debut on 22 October 2016 in the 0–0 home draw against Watford in the Premier League after which he presented with the man of the match award for his work in defence. He scored his first goal for the club on 3 January 2017 in a 2–1 win against Crystal Palace.

In the 2017–18 season, Mawson scored the only goal in a 1–0 home win against Liverpool on 22 January 2018 to help Swansea's survival hopes. Despite this, the club struggled, particularly on the attacking point of view, and despite the player featuring in all 38 Premier League fixtures, he did not prevent the club's relegation, which was confirmed on the final day of the season.

=== Fulham ===
After Swansea's relegation from the Premier League, Mawson signed for newly promoted club Fulham on a four-year contract for an undisclosed fee, reported to be in the region of £20 million.

==== Bristol City (loan) ====
On 6 September 2020, Mawson signed for Championship club Bristol City on a season-long loan. On 26 March 2021, Mawson was recalled by Fulham after making eleven league appearances for Bristol City.

=== Wycombe Wanderers ===
On 11 August 2022, Mawson re-signed for League One club Wycombe Wanderers, with whom he had previously been on loan, on a one-year deal.

On 14 February 2023, Mawson retired from football due to injury.

== International career ==
Mawson played six times and scored one goal for the England national under-21 team from 2016 to 2017, scoring his only goal on 19 June 2017 in a 2–1 win against Slovakia at the 2017 UEFA European Under-21 Championship. England were eventually knocked out by Germany in the semi-final.

On 15 March 2018, Mawson was named for the first time in the England squad for pre-2018 FIFA World Cup friendlies against the Netherlands and Italy in March.

== Career statistics ==
Appearances and goals by club, season and competition
Club	Season	League			FA Cup		League Cup		Other		Total	
Club	Season	Division	Apps	Goals	Apps	Goals	Apps	Goals	Apps	Goals	Apps	Goals
Brentford	2012–13	League One	0	0	0	0	0	0	0	0	0	0
Brentford	2013–14	League One	0	0	—		1	0	0	0	1	0
Brentford	Total		0	0	0	0	1	0	0	0	1	0
Maidenhead United (loan)	2012–13	Conference South	9	0	—		—		—		9	0
Maidenhead United (loan)	2013–14	Conference South	3	0	—		—		1 (Note: Appearance in FA Trophy)	0	4	0
Maidenhead United (loan)	Total		12	0	—		—		1	0	13	0
Luton Town (loan)	2013–14	Conference Premier	1	0	—		—		—		1	0
Welling United (loan)	2013–14	Conference Premier	9	1	—		—		—		9	1
Wycombe Wanderers (loan)	2014–15	League Two	45	6	0	0	1	0	4 (Note: One appearance in Football League Trophy, three appearances and one goal in League Two play-offs)	1	50	7
Barnsley	2015–16	League One	45	6	1	0	2	0	10 (Note: Seven appearances and one goal in Football League Trophy, three appearances League One play-offs)	1	58	7
Barnsley	2016–17	Championship	4	2	—		1	0	—		5	2
Barnsley	Total		49	8	1	0	3	0	10	1	63	9
Swansea City	2016–17	Premier League	27	4	0	0	—		—		27	4
Swansea City	2017–18	Premier League	38	2	3	0	3	1	—		44	3
Swansea City	Total		65	6	3	0	3	1	—		71	7
Swansea City U23	2016–17	—			—		—		2 (Note: Appearances in EFL Trophy)	0	2	0
Fulham	2018–19	Premier League	15	0	0	0	1	0	—		16	0
Fulham	2019–20	Championship	27	0	0	0	0	0	—		27	0
Fulham	2020–21	Premier League	0	0	0	0	0	0	—		0	0
Fulham	2021–22	Championship	2	0	0	0	1	0	—		3	0
Fulham	Total		44	0	0	0	2	0	—		46	0
Bristol City (loan)	2020–21	Championship	11	0	2	0	1	0	—		14	0
Wycombe Wanderers	2022-23	League One	20	0	1	0	0	0	—		21	0
Career total			256	21	7	0	11	1	17	2	21	24

== Honours ==
Barnsley

- Football League One play-offs: 2016
- Football League Trophy: 2015–16

Individual

- Wycombe Wanderers Supporters' Player of the Year: 2014–15
- Wycombe Wanderers Players' Player of the Year: 2014–15
