= Antoine Gounet =

French footballer (born 1988)

Personal information
- Full name: Antoine Gounet
- Date of birth: 16 October 1988 (age 38)
- Place of birth: Saint-Doulchard, France
- Height: 1.85 m (6 ft 1 in)
- Position: Goalkeeper

Youth career
- 2000–2006: Bourges 18
- 2006–2008: Tours

Senior career*
Years	Team	Apps	(Gls)
2008–2011	Tours	0	(0)
2008–2011	Tours B	40	(0)
2011–2013	Brentford	0	(0)
2015–2016	Magreb '90	11	(0)
2017	Achilles '29	0	(0)
2017	Jong Achilles '29	4	(0)
2017–2019	Quevilly-Rouen	0	(0)
2017–2019	Quevilly-Rouen II	21	(0)
- * Club domestic league appearances and goals

Antoine Gounet (born 16 October 1988) is a French former professional footballer who played as a goalkeeper for a number of clubs in France, the Netherlands and England.

== Career ==
=== Early years ===
Gounet grew up in Levet, Cher, France and began his career at his local club Bourges 18, signing at the age of 12.

=== Tours ===
Gounet moved to Ligue 2 club Tours at the age of 18. Following an injury to first team keeper Peter Jehle, Gounet served as backup to Denis Ribeiro for a number of Ligue 2 and Coupe de France matches during the 2008–09 season. While at Tours he was a teammate of future France internationals Laurent Koscielny and Olivier Giroud. Gounet made 40 appearances for the B team in the Championnat de France amateur 2 during his time at the club, including 28 appearances during the 2010–11 season. Gounet's spell at Tours came to an end after he suffered an injury in 2010, which kept him out of football for a year and saw him released by the club in June 2011.

=== Brentford ===
After arriving in London in October 2011, Gounet was awarded a two-week trial at League One club Brentford. By late-January 2012, he had impressed enough to be awarded a contract running until the end of the 2011–12 season, with the option of a further year. Gounet failed to feature for the first team during the second half of the season and played instead for the Development Squad. The option on his contract was taken up in May 2012. He made his only first team appearance for the club with a start in an FA Cup second round replay against Bradford City at Griffin Park on 18 December 2012 and conceded two goals as Brentford ran out 4–2 victors after extra time. During the latter part of the season Gounet became a regular backup to Simon Moore. He was released upon the expiration of his contract, shortly after Brentford's League One Play-off Final defeat to Yeovil Town. Gounet made just one first team appearance for the Bees.

=== Later career ===
Gounet was offered a contract by Ligue 2 club Laval during the 2013 off-season, but turned it down as he wished to remain in England. In January 2014, Gounet tweeted that he had been training with Premier League club Fulham and he trialled with Scottish Championship club Hibernian during the 2014–15 pre-season.

In November 2015, Gounet moved to the Netherlands to sign for Topklasse club Magreb '90. He made 11 appearances during the remainder of the 2015–16 season. On 31 January 2017, Gounet joined Eerste Divisie club Achilles '29 on a contract running until the end of the 2016–17 season. He failed to make an appearance before the end of the season, when the Whiteblacks were relegated after finishing bottom of the Eerste Divisie. He was released when his contract expired.

On 9 July 2017, Gounet returned to France to sign a contract with newly-promoted Ligue 2 club US Quevilly-Rouen. He was an unused substitute on 16 occasions during a poor 2017–18 season, which resulted in relegation to the Championnat National. Gounet made his debut for the club and his only appearance of the 2018–19 season with a start in a 2–1 Coupe de la Ligue defeat to Troyes on 14 August 2018. He announced his retirement in December 2019.

== Personal life ==
Gounet works as a model and a Romana's Pilates instructor.

== Career statistics ==
Appearances and goals by club, season and competition
Club	Season	League			National cup (Note: Includes Coupe de France, FA Cup)		League cup (Note: Includes Coupe de la Ligue, EFL Cup)		Other		Total	
Club	Season	Division	Apps	Goals	Apps	Goals	Apps	Goals	Apps	Goals	Apps	Goals
Tours	2008–09	Ligue 2	0	0	0	0	0	0	—		0	0
Brentford	2012–13	League One	0	0	1	0	0	0	0	0	1	0
Magreb '90	2015–16	Topklasse	11	0	—		—		—		11	0
Achilles '29	2016–17	Eerste Divisie	0	0	—		—		—		0	0
Jong Achilles '29	2016–17	Derde Divisie Sunday	4	0	—		—		—		4	0
US Quevilly-Rouen	2017–18	Ligue 2	0	0	0	0	0	0	—		0	0
US Quevilly-Rouen	2018–19	Championnat National	0	0	—		1	0	—		1	0
US Quevilly-Rouen	Total		0	0	0	0	1	0	—		1	0
US Quevilly-Rouen II	2017–18	Championnat National 3 Group J	9	0	—		—		—		9	0
US Quevilly-Rouen II	2018–19	Championnat National 3 Group J	12	0	—		—		—		12	0
US Quevilly-Rouen II	Total		21	0	—		—		—		21	0
Career total			36	0	1	0	1	0	0	0	38	0
