= 2012–13 Brentford F.C. season =

English football team season

Brentford F.C.
2012–13 season
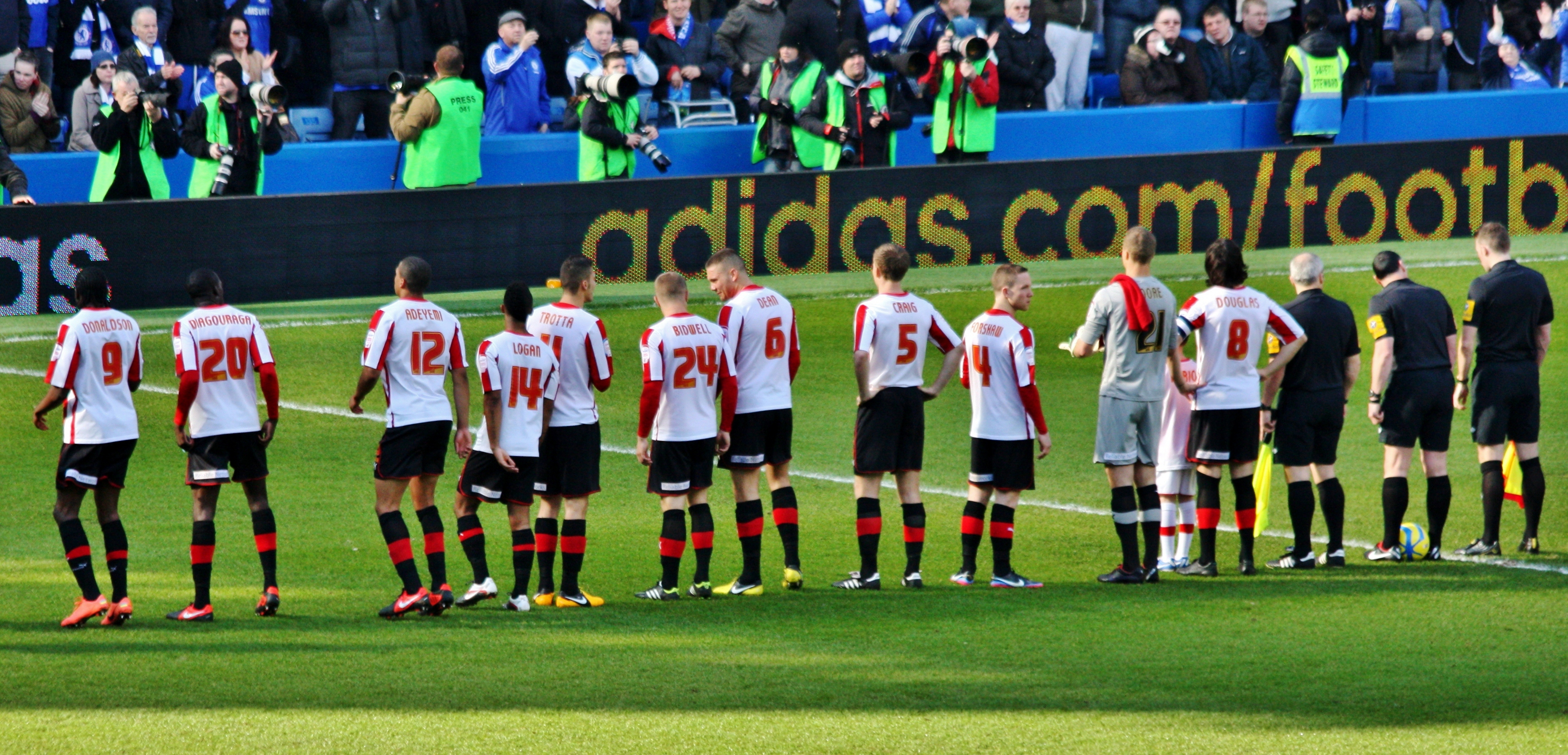
- Chairman: Greg Dyke
- Manager: Uwe Rösler
- Stadium: Griffin Park
- League One: 3rd
- Playoffs: Runners-up
- FA Cup: Fourth round
- League Cup: First round
- Football League Trophy: Quarter-final
- Top goalscorer: League: Donaldson (18); All: Donaldson (24)
- Highest home attendance: 12,300
- Lowest home attendance: 2,643
- Average home league attendance: 6,303
Home colours	Away colours	Third colours

During the 2012–13 English football season, Brentford competed in Football League One. During one of the club's most memorable seasons, the Bees took Premier League giants Chelsea to a replay in the fourth round of the FA Cup and suffered a dramatic last-minute defeat to Doncaster Rovers on the final day of the league season in a "winner takes all" match for automatic promotion to the Championship. The team rallied to beat Swindon Town in the play-off semi-finals, but were defeated by Yeovil Town in the final at Wembley Stadium.

== Season summary ==
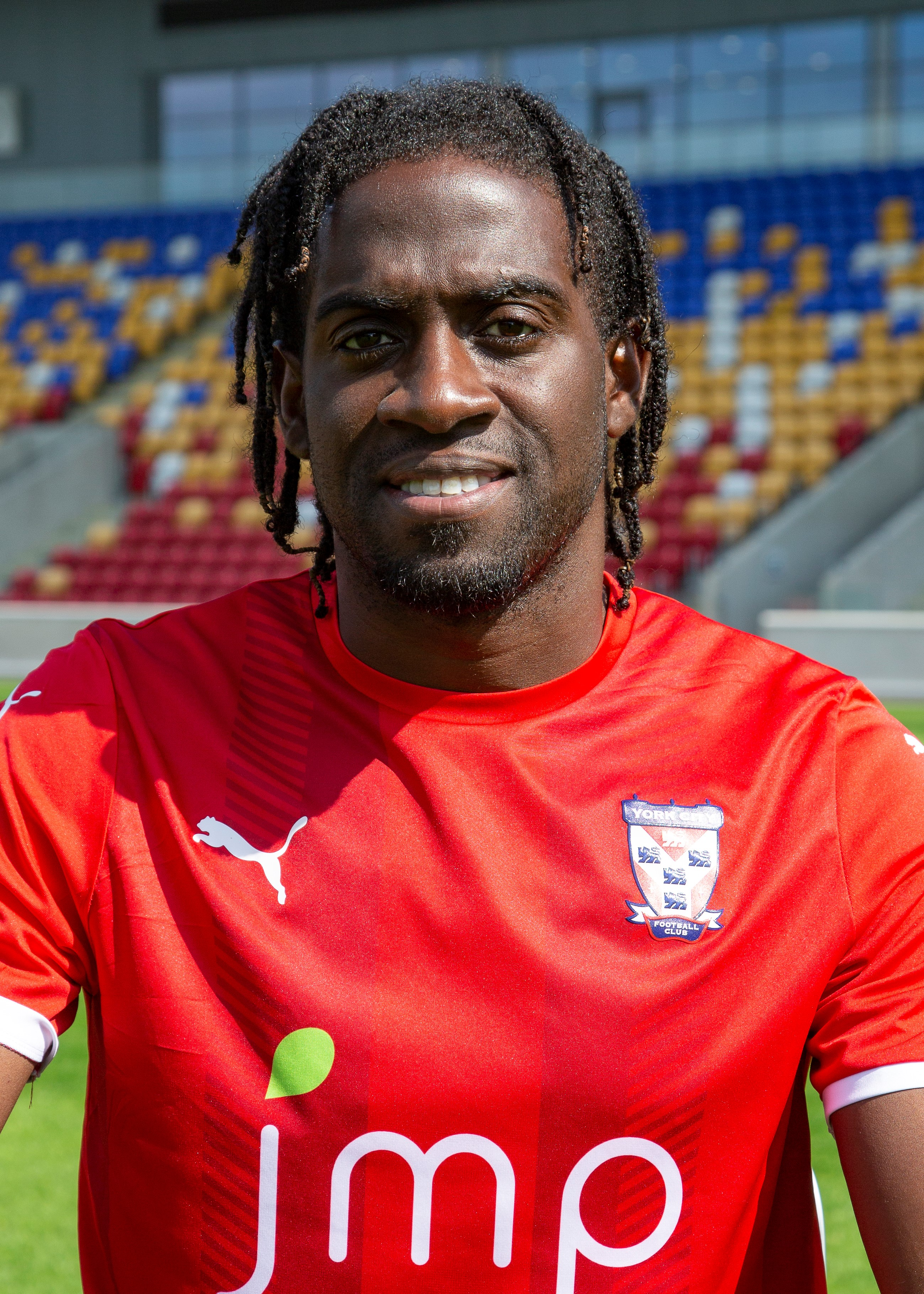
Clayton Donaldson finished the season as Brentford's top scorer, joint-top appearance-maker and won the club's Supporters' Player of the Year award.

=== Pre-season ===
After a 9th-place finish in League One at the end of his first season as manager of Brentford, Uwe Rösler had a desire to imprint his mark on the playing squad and remarked that the key to challenging for promotion during the 2012–13 season would be to score more goals. Despite the purchase of the club by Matthew Benham, the need to continue operating on a similar budget to recent years meant that Rösler and sporting director Mark Warburton had to reduce the size of the squad and conduct a mass clear-out, releasing stalwarts Karleigh Osborne, Marcus Bean, Sam Wood and veteran forward Gary Alexander's loan at Crawley Town was made permanent. The contracts of defenders Craig Woodman, Marcel Eger and Pim Balkestein were cancelled and six days into the season, winger Myles Weston was sold to Gillingham for an undisclosed fee.

By the end of the off-season transfer window, seven new players had been signed on permanent contracts – left back Scott Barron, central defenders Tony Craig and Harlee Dean, midfielder Adam Forshaw, winger Stuart Dallas and forwards Farid El Alagui and Paul Hayes. Three players were signed on loan – left back Jake Bidwell and midfielders Tom Adeyemi and Ryan Fredericks. Bidwell and Adeyemi remained at Griffin Park for the duration of the season.

=== Regular season ===
Brentford began the season with a disappointing 1–0 League Cup first round defeat to Walsall and hovered around mid-table in League One, before coming into form in late October 2012. New forward Paul Hayes failed to produce regular goals and was replaced by Huddersfield Town loanee Jimmy Spencer, who in turn was replaced by Marcello Trotta. The Fulham loanee would remain with the Bees for the duration of the season. Inspired by the form of attacking midfielder Harry Forrester, an unbeaten run of 9 wins and four draws in 13 matches between 23 October 2012 and 21 January 2013 firmly established the Bees as challengers for automatic promotion, rising as high as 2nd position in the table. Headway was also made in the FA Cup during the same period, with victories over Boreham Wood, Bradford City and Southend United setting up a fourth round tie versus West London neighbours Chelsea at Griffin Park on 27 January. In a match televised on ITV, Brentford twice took the lead (through a quick-reaction Marcello Trotta finish and a Harry Forrester penalty), but the Premier League club ensured a replay when Fernando Torres pulled the score back to 2–2 with seven minutes remaining. Brentford were comfortably beaten 4–0 at Stamford Bridge in the replay, which was again televised. The match ended on a sour note when Chelsea defender David Luiz's "sickening" late shoulder charge on Bees midfielder Jake Reeves went unpunished and left Reeves concussed.

The distraction of the Chelsea FA Cup matches had an impact on Brentford's league form, but the Bees rose back into the automatic promotion places for the first time since mid-December after a 1–0 victory over Preston North End at Griffin Park on 16 March. Though his fitness was an issue, the loan signing of Charlton Athletic's Bradley Wright-Phillips helped relieve the tired strikeforce of Clayton Donaldson and Marcello Trotta. Brentford entered the final seven fixtures of the season with the prospect of playing five matches away from home. Of the away fixtures, the team came away with just one victory and drew another three, which included a tempestuous 2–2 draw with Sheffield United at Bramall Lane in which three players were sent off (Tony Craig and Clayton Donaldson for the Bees) and Bradley Wright-Phillips salvaged the draw with an 89th-minute equaliser.

=== The final day ===
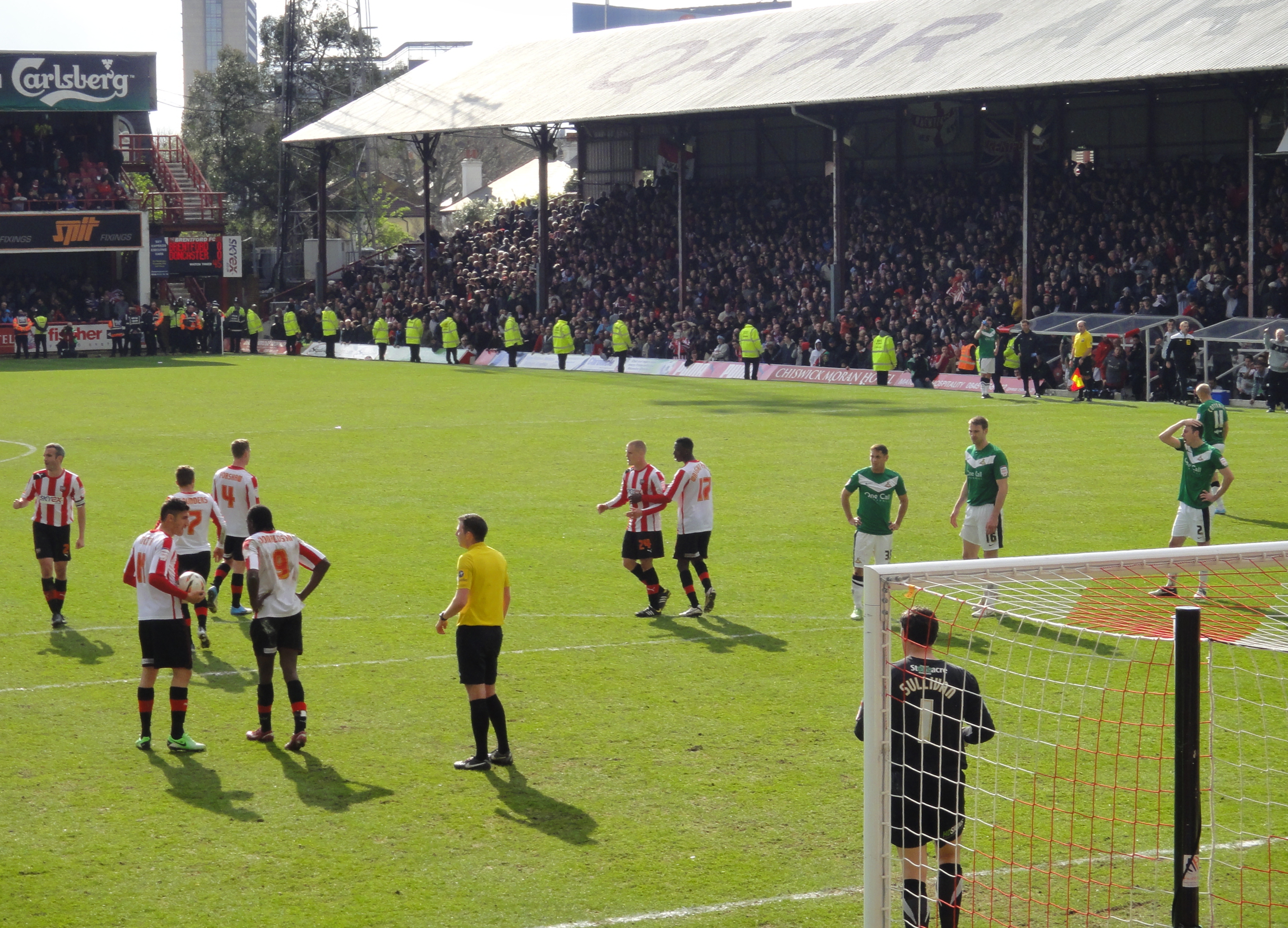
Marcello Trotta (with the ball) prepares to take the injury time penalty kick versus Doncaster Rovers at Griffin Park.

Brentford went into the final day of the season in 3rd place, two points behind 2nd place Doncaster Rovers. The chances of a shot at the League One title were slim, with Bournemouth three points ahead at the top of the table, but with a goal difference of +7 over the Bees. Brentford faced Doncaster Rovers at Griffin Park in the final match of the season and needed to win to secure automatic promotion to the Championship. If Bournemouth drew their match, Doncaster could win the League One title with a victory. The circumstances echoed those of the final day of the 2001–02 season, when the Bees needed to beat 2nd-place Reading at Griffin Park to win automatic promotion, but could only draw 1–1 and were forced to settle for the playoffs. The straight red card which central defender Tony Craig had been shown versus Sheffield United two matches previously was upheld, which meant that he was unavailable for the Doncaster Rovers match and a possible play-off semi-final first leg. Utility player and captain Kevin O'Connor, still not fully fit after nearly six months out injured, was drafted in to play in an unfamiliar centre back role.

The match versus Doncaster Rovers (played in front of a sold out 12,300 crowd at Griffin Park) was tense and mostly played in midfield. Brentford failed to break down the Rovers defence and create many clear cut chances, though the Bees began to take control in the second half. In the midst of a late Brentford siege on the Doncaster goal, Rovers forward Billy Paynter missed an opportunity to win the match when he fired wide of Simon Moore's goal. In the 94th minute, deep into five minutes' injury time and with the score still 0–0, Brentford were given the opportunity to win the match and seal automatic promotion when they were awarded a penalty after Toumani Diagouraga was "flattened" by Jamie McCombe in the penalty area.

After referee Michael Oliver awarded the penalty, loan forward Marcello Trotta grabbed the ball from manager Uwe Rösler's designated penalty taker, captain Kevin O'Connor. Trotta later recalled that "I scored my last penalty and was feeling confident, so I stepped up to take it". Trotta smashed the spot-kick against the crossbar and from the resulting breakaway, James Coppinger scored to win the match and the League One title for Doncaster Rovers. The 1–0 defeat consigned Brentford to a two-legged play-off semi-final versus Swindon Town. Manager Rösler stated after the game that he had not wanted Trotta to take the penalty, but he refused to blame Trotta and would deal with the matter internally. Captain O'Connor told reporters that he "tried to follow orders, but Trotts has gone into the zone, got the ball and he was extremely confident. What can you say? If he scores it, it's perfect but unfortunately he's missed it and it's cost us". Despite the defeat, Brentford finished the season with the best home record in League One.

=== Play-offs ===
Ahead of the two-legged play-off semi-final versus Swindon Town, manager Uwe Rösler revealed that he would pin a list of his nominated penalty takers to the dressing room wall. With Marcello Trotta an unused substitute during the first leg, captain Kevin O'Connor (still deputising for the suspended Tony Craig) converted an injury time penalty to salvage a 1–1 draw going into the second leg at Griffin Park. The second leg proved to be a "pulsating" match, with the Bees twice opening up a two-goal lead through strikes from Clayton Donaldson and an Adam Rooney own goal. The Robins pulled the score back to 3–2 through Joe Devera after an hour, before Aden Flint powered home an injury time header to level the score at 3–3 and force extra time. The goalless extra time period gave way to a penalty shootout in which Brentford emerged victorious, with Adam Forshaw converting the decisive penalty to spark a pitch invasion and send the Bees to the play-off final versus Yeovil Town at Wembley Stadium.

Despite Brentford dominating much of the play-off final, goals from Yeovil Town's Paddy Madden and Dan Burn effectively killed the contest before half time. After pulling a goal back early in the second half through Harlee Dean and despite bringing on attacking players Bradley Wright-Phillips, Paul Hayes and Sam Saunders, Brentford could not create many chances. Yeovil Town emerged 2–1 victors (cementing a treble of victories for the Glovers over the Bees during the season) and Brentford remained in League One.

== League table ==
Pos	Team	Pld	W	D	L	GF	GA	GD	Pts	Promotion, qualification or relegation
1	Doncaster Rovers (C, P)	46	25	9	12	62	44	+18	84	Promotion to Football League Championship
2	Bournemouth (P)	46	24	11	11	76	53	+23	83	Promotion to Football League Championship
3	Brentford	46	21	16	9	62	47	+15	79	Qualification for League One play-offs (Note: Four teams play for one spot and promotion to Football League Championship.)
4	Yeovil Town (O, P)	46	23	8	15	71	56	+15	77	Qualification for League One play-offs
5	Sheffield United	46	19	18	9	56	42	+14	75	Qualification for League One play-offs

Updated to match(es) played on 27 April 2013. Source: BBC Sport
Rules for classification: 1) Points; 2) Goal difference; 3) Number of goals scored
(C) Champions; (O) Play-off winners; (P) Promoted

== Results ==
=== Pre-season ===
11 July 2012	Hampton & Richmond Borough	0–5	Brentford	Beveree Stadium
15:00		Report	Mawson; Dallas; Schoop; Weston; Redwood	Attendance: 929

18 July 2012	Hayes & Yeading United	1–4	Brentford	Beaconsfield Road
	Wishart 42'	Report	Douglas 20'; Forrester 53'; Donaldson 56', 87'

21 July 2012	ZFC Meuselwitz	1–1	Brentford	bluechip-Arena
	Weis	Report	Reeves

24 July 2012	FC Erzgebirge Aue	1–1	Brentford	Stadion am Wasserturm
	Savran	Report	Weston pen.'

27 July 2012	1. FC Lokomotive Leipzig	1–2	Brentford	Bruno-Plache-Stadion
	Stratmann	Report	El Alagui

4 August 2012	Basingstoke Town	1–5	Brentford	The Camrose
	Daly pen'	Report	Douglas; Craig; Donaldson; El Alagui

7 August 2012	Wycombe Wanderers	1–4	Brentford	Adams Park
	Dean o.g.'	Report	Donaldson; Basey o.g.' Dallas; O'Connor	Attendance: 915

=== League One ===
==== Results by round ====
Round	1	2	3	4	5	6	7	8	9	10	11	12	13	14	15	16	17	18	19	20	21	22	23	24	25	26	27	28	29	30	31	32	33	34	35	36	37	38	39	40	41	42	43	44	45	46
Ground	A	H	H	A	H	A	A	H	A	H	H	A	A	H	H	A	H	A	A	H	H	A	A	HA	H	A	H	H	A	H	H	H	A	H	A	A	H	H	H	A	A	A	H	A	A	H
Result	D	L	W	D	W	L	D	W	D	D	W	D	L	W	D	W	W	D	W	W	W	W	W	D	D	W	L	D	L	D	W	D	W	W	L	L	W	W	W	L	D	W	W	D	D	L
Position	13	18	9	11	6	8	12	9	11	11	9	8	10	9	11	8	8	9	7	5	4	2	3	4	4	3	4	3	6	7	6	7	5	4	5	6	3	2	3	3	4	3	3	3	3	3

Source: Statto
A = Away; H = Home; W = Win; D = Draw; L = Loss

==== Results summary ====
Overall								Home						Away					
Pld	W	D	L	GF	GA	GD	Pts	W	D	L	GF	GA	GD	W	D	L	GF	GA	GD
46	21	16	9	62	47	+15	79	14	6	3	37	22	+15	7	10	6	25	25	0

Source: Statto

==== Results ====
===== August =====
18 August 2012 1	Bury	0–0	Brentford	Gigg Lane
15:00	Lockwood (yellow card) 54'	Report		Attendance: 2659; Referee: Boyeson

21 August 2012 2	Brentford	1–3	Yeovil Town	Griffin Park
19:45	Donaldson 55'	Report	Hayter 23', 80'; Hinds (yellow card) 49'; Webster (yellow card) 53'; Ayling (yellow card) 74'; Craig 84' (o.g.)	Attendance: 5269; Referee: Berry

25 August 2012 3	Brentford	5–1	Crewe Alexandra	Griffin Park
15:00	Donaldson 13', 89'; El Alagui 20', 45+2'; Dean 84'	Report	Pogba 48'; Murphy (yellow card) 63'	Attendance: 4858; Referee: Scott

===== September =====
1 September 2012 4	Walsall	2–2	Brentford	Bescot Stadium
15:00	Paterson; Bowerman 29'	Report	Douglas 28'; Donaldson 90'	Attendance: 3434; Referee: Haywood

8 September 2012 5	Brentford	1–0	Colchester United	Griffin Park
15:00	Saunders (yellow card) 37'; El Alagui 88'	Report		Attendance: 5449; Referee: Attwell

13 September 2012 6	Leyton Orient	1–0	Brentford	Brisbane Road
19:45	McSweeney (yellow card) 57'; Cook (yellow card) 73'; Brunt 75'	Report	Craig (yellow card) 40'; Bidwell (yellow card) 80'	Attendance: 3333; Referee: Dowd

18 September 2012 7	Bournemouth	2–2	Brentford	Dean Court
19:45	Tubbs 17'; Charlie Daniels 25' (pen.)	Report	Francis 10' (o.g.); Forrester 68'	Attendance: 5,117; Referee: Langford

22 September 2012 8	Brentford	1–0	Oldham Athletic	Griffin Park
15:00	Forshaw 17'	Report		Attendance: 5251; Referee: Graham
Note: Brentford wore a silver change kit, to commemorate 25 years of the club's Community Sports Trust.

29 September 2012 9	Tranmere Rovers	1–1	Brentford	Prenton Park
15:00	Akpa Akpro 60'	Report	Douglas 90+6'	Attendance: 5720; Referee: Lewis

===== October =====
2 October 2012 10	Brentford	0–0	Shrewsbury Town	Griffin Park
19:45		Report		Attendance: 4,384; Referee: Robinson

6 October 2012 11	Brentford	2–1	Crawley Town	Griffin Park
15:00	Donaldson 23', 76'	Report	Adams 59'	Attendance: 5607; Referee: Naylor

13 October 2012 12	Scunthorpe United	1–1	Brentford	Glanford Park
15:00	Clarke 77'	Report	Forrester 43'	Attendance: 3,008; Referee: Kettle

20 October 2012 13	Doncaster Rovers	2–1	Brentford	Keepmoat Stadium
15:00	Cotterill 74'; Paynter 84'	Report	Douglas 45'	Attendance: 6555; Referee: Haines

23 October 2012 14	Brentford	2–1	Coventry City	Griffin Park
15:00	Forrester 41' 90+4' (pen.)	Report	McGoldrick 7'	Attendance: 5,415; Referee: Stroud

27 October 2012 15	Brentford	2–2	Hartlepool United	Griffin Park
15:00	Hayes 11', 58'	Report	Dean 25' (o.g.); Craig 90'	Attendance: 5213; Referee: Phillips

===== November =====
6 November 2012 16	Portsmouth	0–1	Brentford	Fratton Park
15:00		Report	Donaldson 7'	Attendance: 11,328; Referee: Scott Mathieson

10 November 2012 17	Brentford	2–1	Carlisle United	Griffin Park
15:00	Jonathan Douglas 20'; Hayes 61'	Report	Garner 26'	Attendance: 7,673; Referee: Davis

17 November 2012 18	Preston North End	1–1	Brentford	Deepdale
15:00	Laird 62'	Report	German 89'	Attendance: 8,804; Referee: Miller

20 November 2012 19	Swindon Town	0–1	Brentford	County Ground
19:45		Report	Donaldson 59'	Attendance: 7431; Referee: Whitestone

24 November 2012 20	Brentford	2–0	Sheffield United	Griffin Park
15:00	Donaldson 3'; Forrester 29'	Report		Attendance: 7763; Referee: Andy D'Urso

===== December =====
8 December 2012 21	Brentford	3–2	Milton Keynes Dons	Griffin Park
15:00	Donaldson 43', 89'; Forrester 72'	Report	Lowe 14'; Gleeson 53'	Attendance: 5883; Referee: Collins

15 December 2012 22	Notts County	1–2	Brentford	Meadow Lane
15:00	Craig 20' (o.g.)	Report	Forrester 36'; Donaldson 88'	Attendance: 5,307; Referee: Trevor Kettle

26 December 2012 23	Colchester United	1–3	Brentford	Colchester Community Stadium
15:00	Thompson (red card) 10'; Wright 23'; Potts (yellow card) 79'	Report	Trotta 4'; Forshaw 12'; Douglas (yellow card) 18'; Adeyemi (yellow card) 34' (yellow-red card) 45'; Lee (yellow card) 78'; Dean 85'	Attendance: 4,200; Referee: Gavin Ward

29 December 2012 24	Shrewsbury Town	0–0	Brentford	New Meadow
15:00		Report		Attendance: 5,715; Referee: Bond

===== January =====
1 January 2013 25	Brentford	0–0	Bournemouth	Griffin Park
15:00	Trotta (yellow card) 16'	Report		Attendance: 8,059; Referee: Robinson

12 January 2013 26	Oldham Athletic	0–2	Brentford	Boundary Park
	Baxter (yellow card) 5'	Report	Dondaldson 5', 82' (yellow card) 66'; Diagouraga (yellow card) 69'; Forrester (yellow card) 75'; Forshaw (yellow card) 90'	Attendance: 4615; Referee: Haines

19 January 2013 27	Brentford	1–2	Tranmere Rovers	Griffin Park
15:00	Harlee Dean (yellow card) 41' (goal) 50'; Douglas (yellow card) 75'; Bidwell (yellow card) 90'	Report	Robinson 42' (pen.); Bakayogo (yellow card) 56'; McGurk 66' (yellow card) 75'; Williams (yellow card) 75'; Power (yellow card) 90'	Attendance: 6948; Referee: Deadman

22 January 2013 28	Brentford	2–2	Leyton Orient	Griffin Park
19:45	Hayes 16'; Donaldson 39'; Bidwell (yellow card) 43' (yellow-red card) 57'	Report	Rowlands 6'; Cook 86'	Attendance: 4523; Referee: Tierney

===== February =====
2 February 2013 29	Yeovil Town	3–0	Brentford	Huish Park
15:00	Upson (yellow card) 28' (goal) 40'; Madden 34'; McAllister (yellow card) 80'; Burn 84'	Report	Logan (yellow card) 29'	Attendance: 4106; Referee: Linington

9 February 2013 30	Brentford	2–2	Bury	Griffin Park
15:00	Forrester 52'; Trotta 68'	Report	Ebanks-Landell (yellow card) 48'; Soares 65'; Ajose 76'	Attendance: 5137; Referee: Coote

12 February 2013 31	Brentford	2–0	Stevenage	Griffin Park
19:45	Dean (yellow card) 38'; Adeyemi 44'; Forshaw (yellow card) 67'; Trotta 86'	Report		Attendance: 7022; Referee: Hooper

23 February 2013 32	Brentford	0–0	Walsall	Griffin Park
15:00		Report	Brandy (yellow card) 38'; Mantom (yellow card) 75'	Attendance: 4,781; Referee: Fred Graham

26 February 2013 33	Crawley Town	1–2	Brentford	Broadfield Stadium
19:45	Connolly (red card) 1'; O'Brien (yellow card) 47'; Adams 65'	Report	Forshaw (yellow card) 5' (yellow-red card) 59'; Saunders 16'; Donaldson 32'; Dean (yellow card) 45+4'	Referee: Lee Collins

===== March =====
2 March 2013 34	Brentford	1–0	Scunthorpe United	Griffin Park
15:00	Adeyemi 70'; Douglas (yellow card) 90+1'	Report	Slocombe (yellow card) 7'	Attendance: 5,400; Referee: Phil Gibbs

5 March 2013 35	Stevenage	1–0	Brentford	Broadhall Way
19:45	Dunne (yellow card) 58'; Haber 76'	Report	Wright-Phillips (yellow card) 66'	Attendance: 2,794; Referee: Craig Pawson

9 March 2013 36	Carlisle United	2–0	Brentford	Brunton Park
15:00	O'Hanlon 23'; Thirlwell (yellow card) 41'; Beck 53'	Report	Dean (yellow card) 36'; Wright-Phillips (yellow card) 87'	Attendance: 3,858; Referee: Scott Duncan

12 March 2013 37	Brentford	2–1	Swindon Town	Griffin Park
19:45	Moore (yellow card) 41'; Logan (yellow card) 54'; Saunders 73' (pen.); Donaldson 76'; Wright-Phillips (yellow card) 90+2'	Report	Ferry 32'; Foderingham (yellow card) 71'; Thompson (yellow card) 86'	Attendance: 5,867; Referee: Stuart Attwell

16 March 2013 38	Brentford	1–0	Preston North End	Griffin Park
15:00	Diagouraga (yellow card) 20'; Trotta (yellow card) 80'; Logan (yellow card) 90'; Saunders 90+4' (pen.) (yellow card) 90+5'	Report	Buchanan (yellow card) 54'	Attendance: 6,512; Referee: Gavin Ward

29 March 2013 39	Brentford	2–1	Notts County	Griffin Park
15:00	Diagouraga 21'; Wright-Phillips 70'	Report	Judge 74'	Attendance: 7,412; Referee: Andy D'Urso

===== April =====
1 April 2013 40	Milton Keynes Dons	2–0	Brentford	Stadium mk
15:00	Bowditch 14'; Gleeson 85'	Report		Attendance: 10,455; Referee: Stephen Martin

6 April 2013 41	Coventry City	1–1	Brentford	Ricoh Arena
15:00	Baker 45' (pen.)	Report	Forrester 47'	Attendance: 10,642; Referee: Scott Mathieson

10 April 2013 42	Crewe Alexandra	0–2	Brentford	Alexandra Stadium
19:45		Report	Wright-Phillips 12'; Trotta 83'	Attendance: 4,594; Referee: Bobby Madley

13 April 2013 43	Brentford	3–2	Portsmouth	Griffin Park
15:00	Wright-Phillips 21' (85); Donaldson 86'	Report	Connolly 26'; Cooper 58'	Attendance: 9,149; Referee: Jeremy Simpson

16 April 2013 44	Sheffield United	2–2	Brentford	Bramall Lane
19:45	Long (yellow card) 24'; Maguire (yellow card) 26' (yellow-red card) 72'; Doyle (yellow card) 38'; McMahon (yellow card) 45+4'; Robson 62' (pen.); Kitson (yellow card) 28' (goal) 68'	Report	Moore (yellow card) 23'; Trotta 24' (pen.); Reeves (yellow card) 28'; Donaldson (yellow card) 45' (yellow-red card) 77'; Craig (red card); Logan (yellow card) 81'; Wright-Phillips 89'	Attendance: 23,431; Referee: Keith Stroud

20 April 2013 45	Hartlepool United	1–1	Brentford	Victoria Park
17:20	James 25'	Report	Trotta 39'	Attendance: 3,541; Referee: Michael Naylor

27 April 2013 46	Brentford	0–1	Doncaster Rovers	Griffin Park
15:00		Report	Coppinger 90+6'	Attendance: 12,300; Referee: Oliver

=== Football League play-offs ===
4 May 2013 SF (1st leg)	Swindon Town	1–1	Brentford	County Ground
17:20	Luongo 70'	Report	Kevin O'Connor 90' (pen.)	Attendance: 10,595; Referee: Eltringham

6 May 2013 SF (2nd leg)	Brentford	3–3 (5–4 p)	Swindon Town	Griffin Park
16:30	A. Rooney 24' (o.g.); Donaldson 40', 47'	Report	A. Rooney 44'; Devera 57'; Flint 90'	Attendance: 9,109; Referee: Miller
	Penalties
	Saunders (penalty scored); Hayes (penalty scored); Dean (penalty scored); Craig (penalty scored); Forshaw (penalty scored)		(penalty scored) Devera; (penalty scored) Flint; (penalty scored) Collins; (penalty missed) Storey; (penalty scored) Roberts

19 May 2013 F	Brentford	1–2	Yeovil Town	Wembley Stadium
13:30	Dean 51'	Report	Madden 6'; Burn 42'	Attendance: 41,955; Referee: D'Urso

=== FA Cup ===
3 November 2012 1R	Boreham Wood	0–2	Brentford	Meadow Park
15:00	Reynalds (yellow card) 18'; Jones (yellow card) 46'	Report	Donaldson 16'; Forrester 44'	Attendance: 1,495; Referee: Lewis

30 November 2012 2R	Bradford City	1–1	Brentford	Valley Parade
19:45	Hanson 70'	Report	Logan 43' (yellow card) 66'	Attendance: 3,620; Referee: Sutton

18 December 2012 2R (replay)	Brentford	4–2 (a.e.t.)	Bradford City	Griffin Park
19:45	Trotta 45' (pen.), 102'; Donaldson 103'; Forrester 106'	Report	Reid 34'; Connell 94' (pen.)	Attendance: 2643; Referee: Scott

5 January 2013 3R	Southend United	2–2	Brentford	Roots Hall
15:00	Corr 39', 54'	Report	Adeyemi 29'; Cresswell 38' (o.g.)	Attendance: 5,540; Referee: Dean Whitestone

15 January 2013 3R (replay)	Brentford	2–1	Southend United	Griffin Park
19:45	Hayes 26'; Donaldson 76'	Report	Corr 69'; Prosser (yellow card) 72'	Attendance: 6,526; Referee: Darren Drysdale

27 January 2013 4R	Brentford	2–2	Chelsea	Griffin Park
12:00	Trotta 42'; Forrester 73' (pen.)	Report	Cahill (yellow card) 44'; Oscar 55'; Turnbull (yellow card) 71'; Torres 83'	Attendance: 12,146; Referee: Jon Moss

17 February 2013 4R (replay)	Chelsea	4–0	Brentford	Stamford Bridge
12:00	Mata 55'; Oscar 68'; Ivanović (yellow card) 69'; Lampard 71'; Terry 81'; David Luiz (yellow card) 85'	Report		Attendance: 40,961; Referee: Neil Swarbrick

=== Football League Cup ===
11 August 2012 S1R	Walsall	1–0	Brentford	Bescot Stadium
15:00	Hemmings 8'	Report		Attendance: 2248; Referee: Andy Woolmer

=== Football League Trophy ===
9 October 2012 S2R	Brentford	1–0	Crawley Town	Griffin Park
19:45	Forrester (yellow card) 6'; Saunders 73'	Report		Attendance: 2739; Referee: Williamson

4 December 2012 SQF	Southend United	2–1	Brentford	Roots Hall
19:45	Mkandawire 27'; Hurst 39'; Timlin (yellow card) 76'	Report	Diagouraga (yellow card) 54'; Saunders (yellow card) 76'; Hayes 83'	Attendance: 3052; Referee: Russel

== Playing squad ==
Players' ages are as of the opening day of the 2012–13 season.

No	Position	Name	Nationality	Date of birth (age)	Signed from	Signed in	Notes
Goalkeepers
1	GK	Richard Lee	(England)	5 October 1982 (aged 29)	Watford	2010	
16	GK	Antoine Gounet	(France)	16 October 1988 (aged 23)	Unattached	2012	
21	GK	Simon Moore	(England)	19 May 1990 (aged 22)	Farnborough	2009	
Defenders
2	DF	Kevin O'Connor (c)	(Republic of Ireland)	24 February 1982 (aged 30)	Youth	2000	
3	DF	Scott Barron	(England)	2 September 1985 (aged 26)	Millwall	2012	
5	DF	Tony Craig	(England)	20 April 1985 (aged 27)	Millwall	2012	
6	DF	Harlee Dean	(England)	26 July 1991 (aged 21)	Southampton	2012	
14	DF	Shay Logan	(England)	29 January 1988 (aged 24)	Manchester City	2011	
18	DF	Lee Hodson	(Northern Ireland)	2 October 1991 (aged 20)	Watford	2012	On loan from Watford
24	DF	Jake Bidwell	(England)	21 March 1993 (aged 19)	Everton	2012	On loan from Everton
26	DF	Leon Redwood	(England)	23 September 1991 (aged 20)	Brighton & Hove Albion	2012	
28	DF	Alfie Mawson	(England)	19 January 1994 (aged 18)	Youth	2011	Loaned to Maidenhead United
31	DF	Aaron Pierre	(Grenada)	17 February 1993 (aged 19)	Fulham	2011	
33	DF	Rob Kiernan	(Republic of Ireland)	13 January 1991 (aged 21)	Wigan Athletic	2012	On loan from Wigan Athletic
Midfielders
4	MF	Adam Forshaw	(England)	8 October 1991 (aged 20)	Everton	2012	
7	MF	Sam Saunders	(England)	29 August 1983 (aged 28)	Dagenham & Redbridge	2009	
8	MF	Jonathan Douglas	(Republic of Ireland)	22 November 1981 (aged 30)	Swindon Town	2011	
12	MF	Tom Adeyemi	(England)	24 October 1991 (aged 20)	Norwich City	2012	On loan from Norwich City
15	MF	Stuart Dallas	(Northern Ireland)	19 April 1991 (aged 21)	Crusaders	2012	
19	MF	Harry Forrester	(England)	2 January 1991 (aged 21)	Aston Villa	2011	
20	MF	Toumani Diagouraga	(France)	20 June 1987 (aged 25)	Peterborough United	2010	
22	MF	Jake Reeves	(England)	30 May 1993 (aged 19)	Youth	2011	Loaned to AFC Wimbledon
27	MF	Manny Oyeleke	(England)	24 December 1992 (aged 19)	Youth	2011	Loaned to Northampton Town
34	MF	Charlie Adams	(England)	16 May 1994 (aged 18)	Youth	2011	
Forwards
9	FW	Clayton Donaldson	(Jamaica)	7 February 1984 (aged 28)	Crewe Alexandra	2011	
10	FW	Farid El Alagui	(France)	10 February 1985 (aged 27)	Falkirk	2012	
11	FW	Marcello Trotta	(Italy)	29 September 1992 (aged 19)	Fulham	2012	On loan from Fulham
17	FW	Bradley Wright-Phillips	(England)	12 March 1985 (aged 27)	Charlton Athletic	2013	On loan from Charlton Athletic
23	FW	Paul Hayes	(England)	20 September 1983 (aged 28)	Charlton Athletic	2012	Loaned to Crawley Town
30	FW	Antonio German	(Grenada)	2 January 1991 (aged 21)	Bromley	2012	Loaned to Gillingham
Players who left the club mid-season
~~11~~	MF	Jimmy Spencer	(England)	13 December 1991 (aged 20)	Huddersfield Town	2012	Returned to Huddersfield Town after loan
~~11~~	MF	Myles Weston	(Antigua and Barbuda)	12 March 1988 (aged 24)	Notts County	2009	Transferred to Gillingham
~~18~~	MF	Ryan Fredericks	(England)	10 October 1992 (aged 19)	Tottenham Hotspur	2012	Returned to Tottenham Hotspur after loan
~~32~~	DF	Leon Legge	(England)	1 July 1985 (aged 27)	Tonbridge Angels	2009	Loaned to Gillingham, transferred to Gillingham
32	DF	Liam Moore	(Jamaica)	31 January 1993 (aged 19)	Leicester City	2013	Returned to Leicester City after loan

- Source: Soccerbase

== Coaching staff ==
Name	Role
(Germany) Uwe Rösler	Manager
(Republic of Ireland) Alan Kernaghan	Assistant Manager
(England) Peter Farrell	First Team Coach
(England) Simon Royce	Goalkeeping Coach
(England) Daryl Martin	Physiotherapist
(England) Chris Haslam	Head of Conditioning
(England) Darren Glenister	Sports Therapist
(England) Chris Domoney	Masseur
(England) Bob Oteng	Kit Man

== Statistics ==
=== Appearances and goals ===
Substitute appearances in brackets.

No	Pos	Nat	Name	League		FA Cup		League Cup		FL Trophy		Playoffs		Total	
No	Pos	Nat	Name	Apps	Goals	Apps	Goals	Apps	Goals	Apps	Goals	Apps	Goals	Apps	Goals
1	GK	(England)	Richard Lee	3	0	2	0	0	0	1	0	0	0	6	0
2	DF	(Republic of Ireland)	Kevin O'Connor	6 (6)	0	1	0	1	0	1	0	1	1	10 (6)	1
3	DF	(England)	Scott Barron	5 (7)	0	0 (3)	0	0	0	2	0	0	0	7 (10)	0
4	MF	(England)	Adam Forshaw	37 (6)	3	6	0	0 (1)	0	0	0	3	0	46 (7)	3
5	DF	(England)	Tony Craig	44	0	7	0	1	0	1	0	2	0	55	0
6	DF	(England)	Harlee Dean	44	3	5 (1)	0	1	0	2	0	3	1	55 (1)	4
7	MF	(England)	Sam Saunders	13 (17)	2	3 (4)	0	1	0	2	1	3	0	22 (21)	3
8	MF	(Republic of Ireland)	Jonathan Douglas	44	4	6	0	1	0	0	0	1 (1)	0	52 (1)	4
9	FW	(Jamaica)	Clayton Donaldson	43 (1)	18	6 (1)	4	1	0	1	0	3	2	54 (2)	24
10	FW	(France)	Farid El Alagui	7 (4)	3	0	0	0	0	0	0	0 (1)	0	7 (5)	3
~~11~~	MF	(Antigua and Barbuda)	Myles Weston	0	0	—		1	0	—		—		1	0
14	DF	(England)	Shay Logan	41 (4)	0	4	0	1	0	0	0	3	0	49 (4)	0
15	MF	(Northern Ireland)	Stuart Dallas	3 (4)	0	1 (2)	0	0	0	0	0	0 (1)	0	4 (7)	0
16	GK	(France)	Antoine Gounet	0	0	1	0	0	0	0	0	0	0	1	0
17	FW	(England)	Bradley Wright-Phillips	10 (5)	5	—		—		—		1 (1)	0	11 (6)	5
19	MF	(England)	Harry Forrester	25 (11)	8	4 (3)	3	1	0	2	0	2 (1)	0	34 (15)	11
20	MF	(France)	Toumani Diagouraga	28 (11)	1	4 (1)	0	0 (1)	0	2	0	2	0	36 (13)	1
21	GK	(England)	Simon Moore	43	0	4	0	1	0	1	0	3	0	52	0
22	MF	(England)	Jake Reeves	4 (2)	0	0 (2)	0	1	0	1	0	0	0	6 (4)	0
23	FW	(England)	Paul Hayes	10 (13)	4	5	1	—		2	1	0 (2)	0	17 (15)	6
30	FW	(Grenada)	Antonio German	0 (2)	1	0 (1)	0	0	0	0 (2)	0	0	0	0 (5)	1
31	DF	(Grenada)	Aaron Pierre	0	0	0	0	0	0	0 (1)	0	0	0	0 (1)	0
~~32~~	DF	(England)	Leon Legge	3 (4)	0	2	0	0	0	1 (1)	0	—		6 (5)	0
34	MF	(England)	Charlie Adams	0 (1)	0	0	0	0	0	0	0	0	0	0 (1)	0
Players loaned in during the season
~~11~~	MF	(England)	Jimmy Spencer	0 (2)	0	0	0	—		—		—		0 (2)	0
11	FW	(Italy)	Marcello Trotta	16 (6)	6	3 (2)	3	—		0	0	2	0	21 (8)	9
12	MF	(England)	Tom Adeyemi	21 (9)	2	4 (1)	1	—		1	0	3	0	29 (10)	3
~~18~~	MF	(England)	Ryan Fredericks	1 (3)	0	—		0 (1)	0	0	0	—		1 (4)	0
24	DF	(England)	Jake Bidwell	37 (3)	0	6	0	—		1	0	3	0	47 (3)	0
32	DF	(Jamaica)	Liam Moore	6 (1)	0	—		—		—		—		6 (1)	0
33	DF	(Republic of Ireland)	Rob Kiernan	5 (3)	0	—		—		1	0	0	0	6 (3)	0

- Players listed in italics left the club mid-season.
- Source: Soccerbase

=== Goalscorers ===
No	Pos	Nat	Player	FL1	FAC	FLC	FLT	FLP	Total
9	FW	(Jamaica)	Clayton Donaldson	18	4	0	2	2	24
19	MF	(England)	Harry Forrester	8	3	0	0	0	11
11	FW	(Italy)	Marcello Trotta	6	3	—	0	0	9
23	FW	(England)	Paul Hayes	4	1	—	1	0	6
17	FW	(England)	Bradley Wright-Phillips	5	—	—	—	0	5
8	MF	(Republic of Ireland)	Jonathan Douglas	4	0	0	0	0	4
6	DF	(England)	Harlee Dean	3	0	0	0	1	4
4	MF	(England)	Adam Forshaw	3	0	0	0	0	3
10	FW	(France)	Farid El Alagui	3	0	0	0	0	3
12	MF	(England)	Tom Adeyemi	2	1	—	0	0	3
7	MF	(England)	Sam Saunders	2	0	0	1	0	3
20	MF	(France)	Toumani Diagouraga	1	0	0	0	0	1
30	FW	(Grenada)	Antonio German	1	0	0	0	0	1
2	DF	(Republic of Ireland)	Kevin O'Connor	0	0	0	0	1	1
Opponents				0	0	0	0	1	1
Total				62	12	0	4	5	83

- Players listed in italics left the club mid-season.
- Source: Soccerbase

=== Discipline ===
No	Pos	Nat	Player	FL1		FAC		FLC		FLT		FLP		Total		Pts
No	Pos	Nat	Player	Booked	Sent off (straight red)	Booked	Sent off (straight red)	Booked	Sent off (straight red)	Booked	Sent off (straight red)	Booked	Sent off (straight red)	Booked	Sent off (straight red)	Pts
8	MF	(Republic of Ireland)	Jonathan Douglas	10	0	0	0	0	0	0	0	0	0	10	0	10
14	DF	(England)	Shay Logan	7	0	2	0	0	0	0	0	0	0	9	0	9
9	FW	(Jamaica)	Clayton Donaldson	5	1	0	0	0	0	0	0	1	0	6	1	9
24	DF	(England)	Jake Bidwell	4	1	1	0	0	0	0	0	1	0	6	1	9
6	DF	(England)	Harlee Dean	7	0	0	0	1	0	0	0	0	0	8	0	8
4	MF	(England)	Adam Forshaw	5	1	0	0	0	0	0	0	0	0	5	1	8
5	DF	(England)	Tony Craig	4	1	0	0	0	0	0	0	0	0	4	1	7
20	MF	(France)	Toumani Diagouraga	4	0	0	0	0	0	1	0	1	0	6	0	6
12	MF	(England)	Tom Adeyemi	3	1	0	0	—		0	0	0	0	3	1	6
19	MF	(England)	Harry Forrester	4	0	0	0	0	0	1	0	0	0	5	0	5
7	MF	(England)	Sam Saunders	4	0	0	0	0	0	1	0	0	0	5	0	5
17	FW	(England)	Bradley Wright-Phillips	4	0	—		—		—		0	0	4	0	4
22	MF	(England)	Jake Reeves	1	0	0	0	0	1	0	0	0	0	1	1	4
11	FW	(Italy)	Marcello Trotta	3	0	0	0	—		0	0	0	0	3	0	3
2	DF	(Republic of Ireland)	Kevin O'Connor	2	0	0	0	1	0	0	0	0	0	3	0	3
1	GK	(England)	Richard Lee	2	0	0	0	0	0	0	0	0	0	2	0	2
21	GK	(England)	Simon Moore	2	0	0	0	0	0	0	0	0	0	2	0	2
32	DF	(Jamaica)	Liam Moore	1	0	—		—		—		—		1	0	1
~~18~~	MF	(England)	Ryan Fredericks	1	0	—		0	0	0	0	—		1	0	1
3	DF	(England)	Scott Barron	1	0	0	0	0	0	0	0	0	0	1	0	1
10	FW	(France)	Farid El Alagui	1	0	0	0	0	0	0	0	0	0	1	0	1
Total				75	5	3	0	2	1	3	0	3	0	86	6	104

- Players listed in italics left the club mid-season.
- Source: ESPN FC

=== Management ===
Name	Nat	From	To	Record All Comps					Record League				
Name	Nat	From	To	P	W	D	L	W %	P	W	D	L	W %
Uwe Rösler	(Germany)	11 August 2012	19 May 2013	59	25	21	13	42.37	46	21	16	9	45.65

=== Summary ===
Games played	59 (46 League One, 7 FA Cup, 1 League Cup, 2 Football League Trophy, 3 Football League play-offs)
Games won	25 (21 League One, 3 FA Cup, 0 League Cup, 1 Football League Trophy, 0 Football League play-offs)
Games drawn	21 (16 League One, 3 FA Cup, 0 League Cup, 0 Football League Trophy, 2 Football League play-offs)
Games lost	13 (9 League One, 1 FA Cup, 1 League Cup, 1 Football League Trophy, 1 Football League play-offs)
Goals scored	82 (62 League One, 13 FA Cup, 0 League Cup, 2 Football League Trophy, 5 Football League play-offs)
Goals conceded	68 (47 League One, 12 FA Cup, 1 League Cup, 2 Football League Trophy, 6 Football League play-offs)
Clean sheets	17 (15 League One, 1 FA Cup, 0 League Cup, 1 Football League Trophy, 0 Football League play-offs)
Biggest league win	5–1 versus Crewe Alexandra, 25 August 2012
Worst league defeat	3–0 versus Yeovil Town, 2 February 2013
Most appearances	56, Clayton Donaldson (44 League One, 7 FA Cup, 1 League Cup, 1 Football League Trophy, 3 Football League play-offs), Harlee Dean (44 League One, 6 FA Cup, 1 League Cup, 2 Football League Trophy, 3 Football League play-offs)
Top scorer (league)	18, Clayton Donaldson
Top scorer (all competitions)	24, Clayton Donaldson

== Transfers & loans ==
Players transferred in
Date	Pos.	Name	Previous club	Fee	Ref.
1 July 2012	MF	(Northern Ireland) Stuart Dallas	(Northern Ireland) Crusaders	n/a	
1 July 2012	DF	(England) Harlee Dean	(England) Southampton	Free	
1 July 2012	MF	(England) Adam Forshaw	(England) Everton	Free	
11 July 2012	FW	(France) Farid El Alagui	(Scotland) Falkirk	Free	
13 July 2012	DF	(England) Tony Craig	(England) Millwall	Undisclosed	
31 July 2012	DF	(England) Leon Redwood	(England) Brighton & Hove Albion	Free	
13 August 2012	DF	(England) Scott Barron	(England) Millwall	Undisclosed	
20 August 2012	FW	(England) Paul Hayes	(England) Charlton Athletic	Free	
10 April 2013	DF	(England) Jack Uttridge	(England) Histon	Dual-registration	
Players loaned in
Date from	Pos.	Name	From	Date to	Ref.
10 August 2012	DF	(England) Ryan Fredericks	(England) Tottenham Hotspur	25 October 2012	
28 August 2012	DF	(England) Jake Bidwell	(England) Everton	End of season	
29 August 2012	MF	(England) Tom Adeyemi	(England) Norwich City	End of season	
15 October 2012	FW	(England) Jimmy Spencer	(England) Huddersfield Town	21 November 2012	
15 November 2012	DF	(Republic of Ireland) Rob Kiernan	(England) Wigan Athletic	2 January 2013	
22 November 2012	DF	(Northern Ireland) Lee Hodson	(England) Watford	End of season	
22 November 2012	FW	(Italy) Marcello Trotta	(England) Fulham	End of season	
11 January 2013	DF	(Republic of Ireland) Rob Kiernan	(England) Wigan Athletic	End of season	
19 February 2013	FW	(England) Bradley Wright-Phillips	(England) Charlton Athletic	End of season	
19 February 2013	DF	(Jamaica) Liam Moore	(England) Leicester City	30 March 2013	
27 February 2013	MF	(England) Josh Rees	(England) Arsenal	1 April 2013	
Players transferred out
Date	Pos.	Name	Subsequent club	Fee	Ref.
16 August 2012	MF	(Antigua and Barbuda) Myles Weston	(England) Gillingham	Undisclosed	
31 January 2013	DF	(England) Leon Legge	(England) Gillingham	Undisclosed	
Players loaned out
Date from	Pos.	Name	To	Date to	Ref.
5 November 2012	MF	(England) Jake Reeves	(England) AFC Wimbledon	3 December 2012	
November 2012	DF	(England) Sam Beale	(England) Northwood	January 2013	
November 2012	MF	(England) Josh Clarke	(England) Carshalton Athletic	January 2013	
November 2012	MF	(England) Tyrell Miller-Rodney	(England) Northwood	January 2013	
7 December 2012	FW	(England) Luke Norris	(England) Boreham Wood	11 January 2013	
13 December 2012	DF	(England) Alfie Mawson	(England) Maidenhead United	9 January 2013	
14 December 2012	DF	(England) Sam Griffiths	(England) Carshalton Athletic	10 January 2013	
1 January 2013	DF	(England) Leon Legge	(England) Gillingham	31 January 2013	
28 January 2013	MF	(England) Manny Oyeleke	(England) Northampton Town	1 March 2013	
January 2013	MF	(England) Max Herbert	(England) Ashford Town (Middlesex)	March 2013	
January 2013	MF	(England) Myles Hippolyte	(England) Southall	February 2013	
21 February 2013	DF	(England) Alfie Mawson	(England) Maidenhead United	End of season	
26 February 2013	FW	(Grenada) Antonio German	(England) Gillingham	29 March 2013	
February 2013	MF	(England) Josh Clarke	(England) Carshalton Athletic	End of season	
February 2013	MF	(England) Tyrell Miller-Rodney	(England) Carshalton Athletic	End of season	
February 2013	DF	(Montenegro) Stefan Tomasevic	(England) Northwood	February 2013	
11 March 2013	FW	(England) Paul Hayes	(England) Crawley Town	27 April 2013	
March 2013	DF	(Montenegro) Stefan Tomasevic	(England) Northwood	April 2013	
April 2013	DF	(Montenegro) Stefan Tomasevic	(England) Hayes & Yeading United	End of season	
Players released
Date	Pos.	Name	Subsequent club	Join date	Ref.
6 July 2012	DF	(England) Craig Woodman	(England) Exeter City	9 July 2012	
16 July 2012	DF	(Netherlands) Pim Balkestein	(England) AFC Wimbledon	17 July 2012	
6 December 2012	DF	(England) Michael Kamau	(England) Chalfont St Peter	2013	
30 June 2013	FW	(Grenada) Antonio German	(England) Gillingham	1 July 2013	
30 June 2013	GK	(France) Antoine Gounet	(Netherlands) Magreb '90	November 2015	
30 June 2013	DF	(England) Sam Griffiths	(England) Braintree Town	6 August 2013	
30 June 2013	DF	(England) Leon Redwood	(England) Chelmsford City	9 August 2013	

== Kit ==
Supplier: Puma
Sponsor(s): Skyex

Home	Away	Third

Source: Historical Football Kits

== Development Squad ==
=== Playing squad ===
Players' ages are as of the opening day of the 2012–13 senior season.

#	Position	Name	Nationality	Date of birth (age)	Signed from	Signed in	Notes
Defenders
—	DF	Sam Beale	(England)	15 November 1993 (aged 18)	Youth	Scholar	Loaned to Northwood
—	DF	Josh Clarke	(England)	5 July 1994 (aged 18)	Youth	Scholar	Loaned to Carshalton Athletic
—	DF	Sam Griffiths	(England)	2 November 1992 (aged 19)	Wolverhampton Wanderers	2011	Loaned to Carshalton Athletic
28	DF	Alfie Mawson	(England)	19 January 1994 (aged 18)	Youth	2011	Loaned to Maidenhead United
31	DF	Aaron Pierre	(Grenada)	17 February 1993 (aged 19)	Fulham	2011	
26	DF	Leon Redwood	(England)	23 September 1991 (aged 20)	Unattached	2012	
—	DF	Jack Uttridge	(England)	14 January 1995 (aged 17)	Histon	2013	Dual-registration
Midfielders
34	MF	Charlie Adams	(England)	16 May 1994 (aged 18)	Youth	2011	
—	MF	Tyrell Miller-Rodney	(England)	23 April 1994 (aged 18)	Youth	Scholar	Loaned to Carshalton Athletic and Northwood
27	MF	Manny Oyeleke	(England)	24 December 1992 (aged 19)	Youth	2011	Loaned to Northampton Town
Forwards
30	FW	Antonio German	(Grenada)	2 January 1991 (aged 21)	Unattached	2012	Loaned to Gillingham
—	FW	Luke Norris	(England)	3 June 1993 (aged 19)	Youth	2010	Loaned to Boreham Wood
—	FW	Aaron Scott	(England)	26 October 1993 (aged 18)	Youth	Scholar	
Players who left the club mid-season
—	DF	Michael Kamau	(England)	22 January 1993 (aged 19)	Fulham	2011	Released
—	MF	Josh Rees	(England)	4 October 1993 (aged 18)	Arsenal	2013	Returned to Arsenal after loan

- Source: brentfordfc.co.uk

=== Results and table ===
==== Professional Development League Two South ====
Pos	Club	Pld	W	D	L	F	A	GD	Pts
4	Brentford DS	20	12	2	6	45	34	11	38

==== Middlesex Senior Charity Cup ====
13 November 2012 1R	Staines Lammas	1–3	Brentford DS	Robert Parker Stadium
19:45	Mwanza 30'	Report	Norris 22', 72'; Hippolyte 35'

2 May 2013 SF	Hanworth Villa	0–3	Brentford DS	Rectory Meadow
		Report	Hippolyte 12'; Lavender; Norris

9 May 2013 F	Uxbridge	5–2	Brentford DS	Honeycroft
	Fitzgerald 52'; Kabamra 61', 64'; Tomkins 71'; Woods 76'	Report	Dennison 18' (o.g.); Stockwell 32'

- Source: brentfordfc.com

=== Summary ===
Games played	23 (20 Professional Development League Two South, 3 Middlesex Senior Charity Cup)
Games won	14 (12 Professional Development League Two South, 2 Middlesex Senior Charity Cup)
Games drawn	2 (2 Professional Development League Two South, 0 Middlesex Senior Charity Cup)
Games lost	7 (6 Professional Development League Two South, 1 Middlesex Senior Charity Cup)
Goals scored	53 (45 Professional Development League Two South, 8 Middlesex Senior Charity Cup)
Goals conceded	40 (34 Professional Development League Two South, 6 Middlesex Senior Charity Cup)
Clean sheets	5 (4 Professional Development League Two South, 1 Middlesex Senior Charity Cup)
Biggest league win	6–0 versus Colchester United DS, 14 September 2012
Worst league defeat	5–1 versus Charlton Athletic DS, 19 November 2012
Most appearances	22, Charlie Adams (19 Professional Development League Two South, 3 Middlesex Senior Charity Cup)
Top scorer (league)	10, Luke Norris
Top scorer (all competitions)	13, Luke Norris

== Awards ==
- Supporters' Player of the Year: Clayton Donaldson
- Players' Player of the Year: Harlee Dean, Simon Moore
- Football League Family Excellence Award
