= Tommy Fletcher =

English footballer

Personal information
- Full name: Tommy Anthony Fletcher
- Date of birth: 22 January 1995 (age 31)
- Place of birth: Hoddesdon, England
- Position: Defender

Team information
- Current team: Welwyn Garden City

Senior career*
| Years | Team | Apps | (Gls) |
| 2012–2013 | Cheshunt | 42 | (3) |
| 2013–2015 | Wycombe Wanderers | 1 | (0) |
| 2013–2014 | → Bishop's Stortford (loan) | 6 | (0) |
| 2014 | → Chesham United (loan) | 8 | (0) |
| 2019 | Hertford Town | 4 | (0) |
| 2019–2020 | Tring Athletic | 19 | (1) |
| 2020–2022 | Walthamstow | 37 | (3) |
| 2022– | Welwyn Garden City | 7 | (0) |
- * Club domestic league appearances and goals as of 10:37, 10 October 2022 (UTC)

Tommy Anthony Fletcher (born 22 January 1995) is an English professional footballer who plays as a defender for Welwyn Garden City.

== Career ==
Fletcher began his career with non-league Cheshunt and in July 2013 signed for Football League side Wycombe Wanderers after a successful trial. He made his professional debut on 3 September 2013 in a 2–0 victory over Exeter City in the Football League Trophy.

Fletcher signed a new year long contract on 30 May 2014.

After a spell on loan at Bishop's Stortford during the 2013–14 season, Fletcher signed a three-month loan deal at Southern Football League Premier Division side Chesham United in August 2014.

In 2020, Fletcher signed for Walthamstow following spells at Hertford Town and Tring Athletic. In October 2022, the in-demand Fletcher signed for Welwyn Garden City.
