= Sam Saunders (footballer) =

English footballer (born 1983)

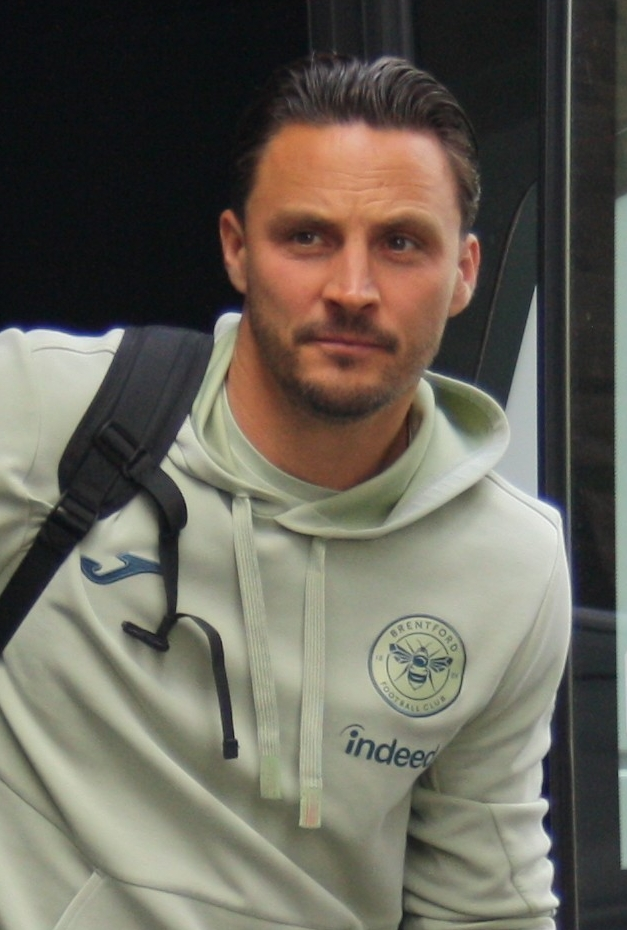
- Saunders while head coach of Brentford B in 2026

Personal information
- Full name: Sam Daniel Saunders
- Date of birth: 29 August 1983 (age 43)
- Place of birth: Erith, England
- Height: 5 ft 8 in (1.73 m)
- Position: Midfielder

Team information
- Current team: Brentford B (head coach)

Youth career
- 1994–1999: Charlton Athletic
- 1999–2000: Fulham
- 2000–2001: Welling United

Senior career*
Years	Team	Apps	(Gls)
2001–2002	Welling United	4	(2)
2002–2004	Ashford Town (Kent)	59	(4)
2004–2005	Carshalton Athletic	48	(9)
2005–2009	Dagenham & Redbridge	126	(19)
2009–2017	Brentford	170	(26)
2015	→ Wycombe Wanderers (loan)	11	(1)
2017–2019	Wycombe Wanderers	43	(2)
2019	Colchester United	6	(0)
2019–2021	Richmond & Kew	12	(8)
2021–2023	Hanwell Town	28	(7)
2023–2024	Langley	13	(1)
Total		524	(80)

Managerial career
- 2025–: Brentford B
- * Club domestic league appearances and goals

Sam Daniel Saunders (born 29 August 1983) is an English professional footballer, who is head coach of Brentford B.

Saunders made over 290 appearances as a midfielder in the English Football League, most notably for Brentford and Dagenham & Redbridge. He began his career in non-League football and in 2007 was part of the Dagenham & Redbridge team which was promoted to the Football League for the first time in the club's history. He later made over 200 appearances for Brentford and is a member of the club's Hall of Fame. After retiring from League football as a player in 2019, he joined Brentford B as an assistant coach. He remained in the role until 2025, when he was appointed head coach.

== Career ==
=== Early years and non-League football ===
Saunders began his career at Charlton Athletic and spent five years in the club's youth setup up to the age of 15. He spent a year in the academy at Fulham, but was unable to win a contract and dropped into non-League football when he signed for Southern League Premier Division club Welling United's youth team in 2000. While with Welling, Saunders returned to Fulham briefly to appear in a youth tournament in Marseille, but was unable to win a scholarship deal. Saunders played sparingly for Welling before moving to Southern League First Division East club Ashford Town (Kent) on 7 March 2002. He moved to the Isthmian League Premier Division to join Carshalton Athletic in February 2004 and after being allocated to the newly created Conference South for the 2004–05 season, the Robins narrowly avoided relegation during Saunders' solitary full season on the club's the books.

=== Dagenham & Redbridge ===
Saunders joined Conference Premier club Dagenham & Redbridge during the 2005 off-season. Injuries disrupted the start of Saunders' first season at Dagenham, but following a starting appearance in a 2–1 league win over Tamworth on 21 January 2006, he became a regular in the first team until the end of the season. He made 29 appearances during the 2005–06 season and scored three goals as Dagenham finished in mid-table. Saunders was a virtual ever-present during the 2006–07 season, making 43 appearances and scoring three goals as Dagenham won the Conference Premier title to secure promotion to the Football League for the first time in the club's history.

Saunders started each of Dagenham's first 10 games in League Two and played in the club's first ever League Cup tie on 14 August 2007, which ended in a 2–1 defeat to Luton Town. A medial ligament problem in October saw him miss over two months of the season and he endured another injury-hit spell between late January and early April 2008. He finished the 2007–08 season with 25 appearances and one goal.

Saunders began the 2008–09 season in excellent form, with five goals in a seven-match spell. Beginning with an injury time equaliser in a 1–1 draw with Chesterfield on 14 March, he finished the 2008–09 season with a run of six goals in eight games, as Dagenham narrowly missed out on the League Two playoffs. His form won him the League Two Player of the Month award for April 2009. It was Saunders' final season for the Daggers, in which he made 45 appearances and scored 14 goals. During his four seasons at Victoria Road, he made 142 appearances and scored 21 goals.

=== Brentford ===
==== League One (2009–2012) ====
On 1 July 2009, Saunders and Dagenham & Redbridge teammates Danny Foster and Ben Strevens signed for League One club Brentford on free transfers, with Saunders agreeing a three-year contract. Used as a wide midfield player by manager Andy Scott, Saunders began the 2009–10 season as a starter, before falling out of favour in October and being used as an impact substitute.

Despite making 30 appearances during the 2009–10 season, Saunders found himself well down the wide-midfield pecking order at the start of 2010–11 and didn't make an appearance until 18 September 2010. He requested a loan move, which was rejected by Andy Scott and he later admitted that the first few months of the 2010–11 season were the most difficult of his career. After Andy Scott was sacked in February 2011, teammate Nicky Forster was given the manager's job until the end of the season and immediately reinstated Saunders to the starting line-up. Saunders scored Brentford's first goal in their 2–1 Football League Trophy semi-final second leg win over Exeter City on 7 February, which sent the Bees to the 2011 Football League Trophy Final at Wembley Stadium. He started in the final, but came away empty-handed as Brentford lost 1–0 to Carlisle United. Saunders made 27 appearances during the 2010–11 season and scored three goals.

Under new manager Uwe Rösler for the 2011–12 season, Saunders went on a goalscoring run in September and October 2011, scoring four goals in six games and helping Brentford to a winning position in each game. He came into form again in January 2012, scoring three goals in five games. Saunders signed a one-year contract extension in late February 2012. He finished the 2011–12 season with 43 appearances, a seasonal-best 12 goals and he was also credited with 9 assists.

==== Challenging for promotion (2012–2014) ====
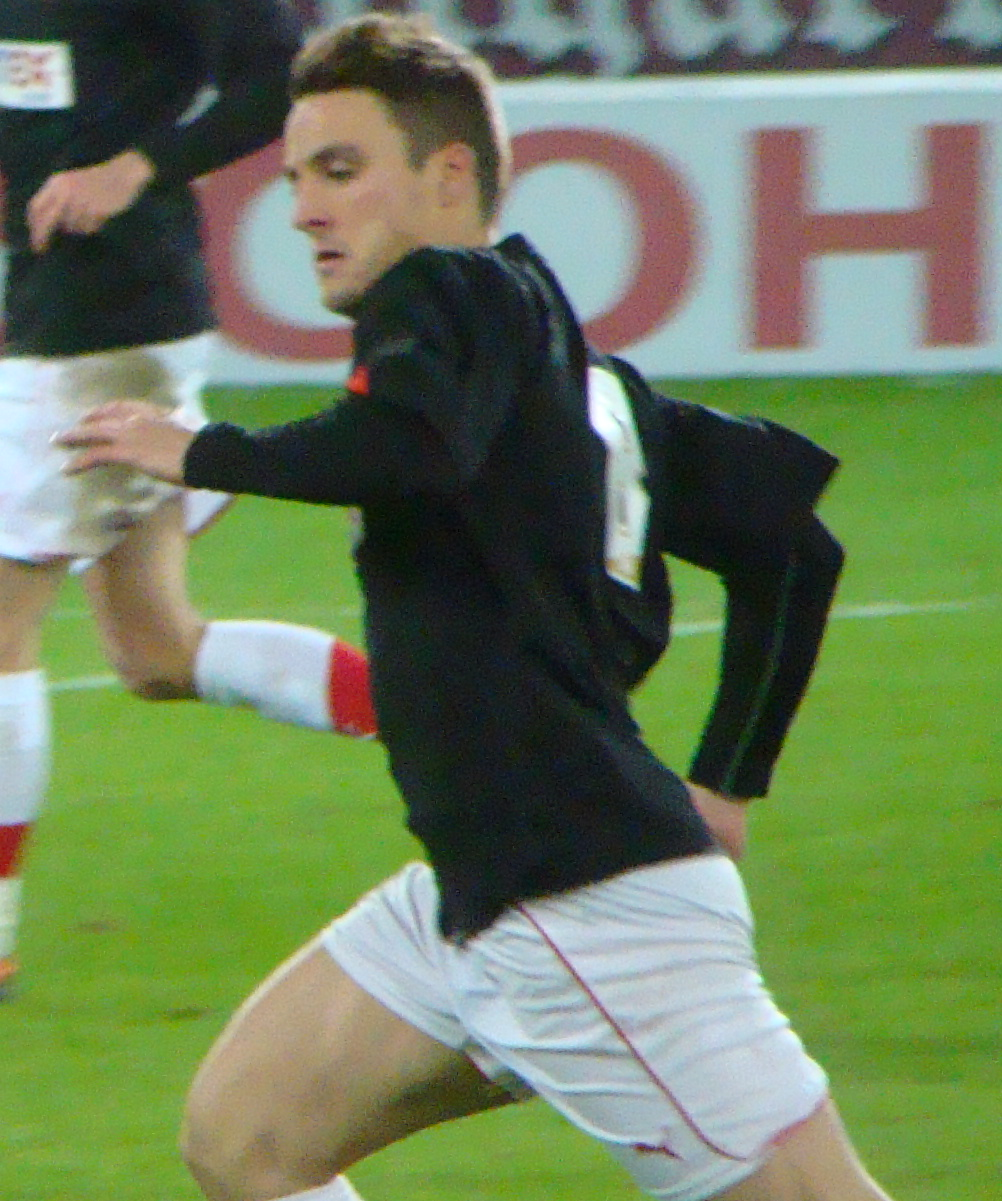
Saunders playing for Brentford DS in 2013.

Saunders began the 2012–13 season as a first-choice at the top of a midfield diamond formation, but he was dropped to the bench in mid-September 2012 and was utilised predominantly as a substitute for the remainder of the season. Saunders appeared in each of Brentford's three end-of-season playoff games as a substitute, but he was unable to help the Bees to victory in the 2013 League One play-off final. He made 44 appearances and scored three goals during the 2012–13 season and signed a new two-year contract in June 2013.

Saunders began the 2013–14 season with starting roles in cup games and substitute cameos in the league. An illness suffered by George Saville brought Saunders into the game as a first-half substitute against Preston North End on 21 December and late in the second half he capped a fine Brentford performance by scoring the third goal in a 3–0 victory. He went on to score in four consecutive games and his form won him the December 2013 League One Player of the Month award. Saunders was sidelined with iliotibial band syndrome in mid-January 2014, which required season-ending surgery in February. He recovered sufficiently to be included in the matchday squad for the return match versus Preston North End on 18 April, but was ruled out with a quadriceps injury. In his absence, Brentford went on to win automatic promotion to secure a place in the Championship for the 2014–15 season.

==== Championship (2014–2017) ====
Saunders travelled with the Brentford squad to the IMG Academy in Florida in July 2014 for a pre-season training camp and reported that his injured knee was "fine". The knee subsequently became inflamed and he failed to return to full training until 14 October 2014. Saunders made his first competitive appearance for 10 months with a late cameo in a 3–2 victory over Millwall on 8 November. He failed to appear again until Boxing Day, but made his presence felt, when he scored two late goals after coming on for Alan Judge during the second half of a 4–2 defeat to Ipswich Town. Saunders signed a one-year contract extension on 15 January 2015. He finished 2014–15 with just six appearances and spent the final three months of the season away on loan.

A hamstring injury suffered while on loan in May 2015 prevented Saunders from playing at all in Brentford's 2015–16 pre-season and he returned to full training in early August 2015. He made his first appearance of the season as a late substitute for Konstantin Kerschbaumer in a 3–1 defeat to Reading on 29 August, but was ruled out again after the match for a period of further rehabilitation. He returned to fitness in November and made frequent second-half substitute appearances under interim head coach Lee Carsley and his replacement Dean Smith. He scored his first goal of the season in a 1–1 draw with Leeds United on 26 January 2016 and he signed a new one-year contract 10 days later. but lost his starting place to Konstantin Kerschbaumer later in the month. He regained it in March and scored goals in wins versus Ipswich Town and West London rivals Fulham in April. Saunders finished the 2015–16 season with 25 appearances and three goals.

After 67 minutes of a league match versus Ipswich Town on 13 August 2016, Saunders came on as a substitute for Maxime Colin to make his 200th appearance for Brentford. By mid-January 2017 and having failed to make an appearance for nearly three months, co-director of football Rasmus Ankersen revealed that the club were open to offers for Saunders and he departed Griffin Park on 20 January 2017. During 7 1/2 years with Brentford, Saunders made 206 appearances and scored 30 goals. He was inducted into the Brentford Hall of Fame in May 2017.

=== Wycombe Wanderers ===
On 27 February 2015, Saunders joined League Two club Wycombe Wanderers on a one-month loan, which was later extended until the end of the 2014–15 season. He scored his first goal for the club in a 3–2 victory over Luton Town on 24 March 2015. Saunders' season ended in double heartbreak, as he was substituted with a torn calf less than a minute into the Chairboys' shoot-out defeat to Southend United in the 2015 League Two play-off final. He made 14 appearances and scored two goals during his spell at Adams Park.

Nearly two years after he initially joined Wycombe Wanderers on loan, Saunders signed an 18-month permanent contract with the club on a free transfer on 20 January 2017. He made 18 appearances during the remainder of the 2016–17 season and scored the first goal of his second spell with the club with the opener in a 2–0 victory over Barnet on 17 April 2017. Despite missing three of the final months of the 2017–18 season with injury, Saunders made 27 appearances and two goals during a successful campaign, which ended with automatic promotion to League One after a third-place finish. He signed a new one-year contract on 3 May 2018, but managed just eight appearances before his contract was terminated by mutual consent on 30 January 2019. Across his two spells at Adams Park, Saunders made 67 appearances and scored six goals.

=== Colchester United ===
On 30 March 2019, Saunders joined playoff-chasing League Two club Colchester United on a free transfer, on a contract running until the end of the 2018–19 season. He made six appearances before the end of the season and after rejecting a new contract, he announced his retirement in June 2019.

=== Return to non-League football ===
In November 2019, Saunders began making ad-hoc appearances for Surrey South Eastern Combination club Richmond & Kew. In early December 2021, he joined Isthmian League South Central Division club Hanwell Town. Saunders made 19 appearances and scored seven goals during a 2021–22 season which ended with promotion via the end-of-season playoffs. He signed a new one-year contract in May 2022 and made 15 appearances during the 2022–23 season. In June 2023, Saunders transferred to Combined Counties League First Division club Langley and made 11 appearances during the 2023–24 season. He was retained for the 2024–25 season, but made just three early-season appearances.

== Coaching career ==
During the second half of the 2018–19 season, Saunders spent a period coaching Brentford B. In June 2019, he took over the role as assistant coach of the team and made occasional appearances as a player. In January 2020, it was reported that Saunders was studying for his UEFA A Licence, which he completed by the following year. As of 2021, he is affiliated with Surrey-based sports coaching company BeSports. When fixtures clashed after Brentford B head coach Neil MacFarlane's dual appointment as Scotland U19 head coach in August 2024, Saunders covered the role of B team head coach. After MacFarlane was promoted into the first team coaching setup in July 2025, Saunders was appointed head coach of the B team. He guided the team to the 2025–26 Professional U21 Development League regular season championship.

== Personal life ==
Before becoming a professional footballer, Saunders worked as an electrician for the London Underground. Looking back in 2011, he remarked "it was a horrible job, but it was money and gave me the opportunity to go out and play. I used to start work at half 10 at night and get in at five or six in the morning. I would go training in the evening, then go straight into work again. When John Still came calling I couldn't say no, even though I had to take a pay cut to get back into football. My parents told me they would have my back, which was great, but luckily the gamble paid off. I enjoy every second of it and don't want it to stop. I appreciate the position I'm in, being able to earn a living from doing something I love".

Saunders was invited by the Hounslow Chronicle to write a column during Brentford's 2013–14 season, which ran from August 2013 until June 2014. Saunders has undertaken occasional television work, appearing on BBC Late Kick Off in April 2014 and as a pundit for Sky Sports' Football League coverage. Saunders co-owns custom swimwear company Thomas Royall with fellow footballers Liam Ridgewell and John Terry, though the company went into voluntary liquidation in October 2019. As of January 2013, Saunders had bought a stake in his sister's hairdressers and solicited funding from the PFA in order to undertake a "Introduction to Barbering" course. While Harry Forrester was a Brentford player, he roomed with Saunders.

== Career statistics ==
Appearances and goals by club, season and competition
Club	Season	League			FA Cup		League Cup		Other		Total	
Club	Season	Division	Apps	Goals	Apps	Goals	Apps	Goals	Apps	Goals	Apps	Goals
Welling United	2000–01	Southern League Premier Division	3	2	0	0	—		0	0	3	2
Welling United	2001–02	Southern League Premier Division	1	0	0	0	—		0	0	1	0
Welling United	Total		4	2	0	0	—		0	0	4	2
Ashford Town (Kent)	2001–02	Southern League First Division East	12	0	0	0	—		1 (Note: Appearance in Southern League Cup)	0	13	0
Ashford Town (Kent)	2002–03	Southern League First Division East	33	3	1	0	—		4 (Note: 2 appearances and 1 goal in Southern League Cup, 1 appearance in FA Trophy, 1 appearance in Kent Senior Cup)	1	38	4
Ashford Town (Kent)	2003–04	Southern League First Division East	18	1	0	0	—		5 (Note: 2 appearances in FA Trophy, 2 appearances in Kent Senior Cup, 1 appearance in Southern League Cup)	0	23	1
Ashford Town (Kent)	Total		63	4	1	0	—		10	1	74	5
Carshalton Athletic	2003–04	Isthmian League Premier Division	12	3	—		—		—		12	3
Carshalton Athletic	2004–05	Conference South	36	6	0	0	—		0	0	36	6
Carshalton Athletic	Total		48	9	0	0	—		0	0	48	9
Dagenham & Redbridge	2005–06	Conference Premier	22	2	1	0	—		6 (Note: 5 appearances and 1 goal in FA Trophy, 1 appearance in EFL Trophy)	1	29	3
Dagenham & Redbridge	2006–07	Conference Premier	42	3	1	0	—		0	0	43	3
Dagenham & Redbridge	2007–08	League Two	22	0	1	0	1	0	1 (Note: Appearance(s) in EFL Trophy)	1	25	1
Dagenham & Redbridge	2008–09	League Two	40	14	3	0	1	0	1	0	45	14
Dagenham & Redbridge	Total		126	19	6	0	2	0	8	2	142	21
Brentford	2009–10	League One	26	1	2	0	1	0	1	0	30	1
Brentford	2010–11	League One	21	2	1	0	1	0	4	1	27	3
Brentford	2011–12	League One	37	10	2	1	1	0	3	1	43	12
Brentford	2012–13	League One	31	3	7	0	1	0	5 (Note: 3 appearances in EFL League One play-offs, 2 appearances and 1 goal in EFL Trophy)	1	44	4
Brentford	2013–14	League One	17	5	1	0	2	0	2	0	22	5
Brentford	2014–15	Championship	5	2	1	0	0	0	—		6	2
Brentford	2015–16	Championship	25	3	0	0	0	0	—		25	3
Brentford	2016–17	Championship	8	0	—		1	0	—		9	0
Brentford	Total		170	26	15	1	6	0	15	3	206	30
Wycombe Wanderers (loan)	2014–15	League Two	11	2	—		—		3 (Note: Appearances in EFL League Two play-offs)	0	14	2
Wycombe Wanderers	2016–17	League Two	17	1	1	0	—		—		18	1
Wycombe Wanderers	2017–18	League Two	22	1	3	1	0	0	2	0	27	2
Wycombe Wanderers	2018–19	League One	4	0	0	0	2	1	2	0	8	1
Wycombe Wanderers	Total		54	4	4	1	2	1	7	0	67	6
Colchester United	2018–19	League Two	6	0	—		—		—		6	0
Richmond & Kew	2019–20	Surrey South Eastern Combination Intermediate Third Division	3	4	—		—		—		3	4
Richmond & Kew	2020–21	Surrey South Eastern Combination Intermediate Third Division	7	3	—		—		—		7	3
Richmond & Kew	2021–22	Surrey South Eastern Combination Intermediate Second Division	2	1	—		—		—		2	1
Richmond & Kew	Total		12	8	—		—		—		12	8
Hanwell Town	2021–22	Isthmian League South Central Division	18	7	—		—		1 (Note: Appearance in Isthmian League South Central Division play-offs)	0	19	7
Hanwell Town	2022–23	Southern League Premier Division South	10	0	1	0	—		4 (Note: 3 appearances in FA Trophy, 1 appearance in Middlesex Senior Charity Cup)	0	15	0
Hanwell Town	Total		28	7	1	0	—		5	0	34	7
Langley	2023–24	Combined Counties League First Division	11	1	0	0	—		0	0	11	1
Langley	2024–25	Combined Counties League First Division	2	0	0	0	—		1 (Note: Appearance in FA Vase)	0	3	0
Langley	Total		13	1	0	0	—		1	0	14	1
Career total			524	80	28	2	10	1	46	6	607	89

== Honours ==
Dagenham & Redbridge

- Conference Premier: 2006–07

Brentford

- Football League One second-place promotion: 2013–14
- Football League Trophy runner-up: 2010–11

Wycombe Wanderers

- EFL League Two third-place promotion: 2017–18

Individual

- EFL League One Player of the Month: December 2013
- EFL League Two Player of the Month: April 2009
- Brentford Hall of Fame
