= 2016–17 Cambridge United F.C. season =

Cambridge United
2016–17 season
- Chairman: Dave Doggett
- Manager: Shaun Derry
- Stadium: Abbey Stadium
- League Two: 11th
- FA Cup: Third round Lost to Leeds United
- EFL Cup: Second round Lost to Wolverhampton Wanderers
- EFL Trophy: Second round Lost to Bradford City
- Top goalscorer: League: Luke Berry (17); All: Luke Berry (22)
- Highest home attendance: 7,973 v Leeds United, FA Cup
- Lowest home attendance: 666 v Scunthorpe United, EFL Trophy
Home colours	Away colours

The 2016–17 season was Cambridge United's 104th season in their history, their 38th in the Football League and their third consecutive season in League Two. Along with League Two, the club also participated in the FA Cup, EFL Cup and EFL Trophy.

The season covers the period from 1 July 2016 to 30 June 2017.

== Squad ==
=== Squad details at start of season ===
No.	Name	Pos.	Nat.	Place of birth	Age	Apps *	Goals *	Signed from	Date signed	Fee	Ends
Goalkeepers
1	Will Norris	GK	(England)	Watford	33	39	0	Royston Town	16 July 2012	Free	30 June 2017
13	David Gregory	GK	(England)	Croydon	32	0	0	Crystal Palace	3 June 2016	Free	30 June 2017
Defenders
2	Greg Taylor	FB	(England)	Bedford	36	106	0	Luton Town	20 June 2013	Free	30 June 2017
3	Blair Adams	LB	(England)	South Shields	35	0	0	Notts County	8 July 2016	Free	30 June 2017
5	Mark Roberts	CB	(England)	Northwich	43	30	2	Fleetwood Town	25 May 2015	Free	30 June 2017
6	Leon Legge	CB	(England)	Bexhill-on-Sea	41	39	3	Gillingham	19 May 2015	Free	30 June 2017
14	Josh Coulson	CB	(England)	Cambridge	37	265	14	Academy	6 October 2007†	Trainee	30 June 2017
15	Sean Long	FB	(Republic of Ireland)	(Republic of Ireland) Dublin	31	0	0	Reading	28 July 2016	6 month loan	8 January 2017
16	Tom Dallison	CB	(England)	Dagenham	30	0	0	Brighton & Hove Albion	18 July 2016	6 month loan	8 January 2017
22	Elliot Omozusi	RB	(England)	Hackney	37	14	0	Leyton Orient	12 June 2015	Free	30 June 2017
Midfielders
4	James Dunne	CM	(England)	Farnborough	37	19	1	Portsmouth	14 January 2016	Free	30 June 2017
7	Piero Mingoia	RW	(England)	Enfield	35	0	0	Accrington Stanley	2 June 2016	Free	30 June 2018
8	Luke Berry	CM	(England)	Cambridge	34	174	34	Barnsley	15 June 2015	Undisclosed	30 June 2019
11	Harrison Dunk	LW	(England)	London	36	162	17	Bromley	7 June 2011	Free	30 June 2018
12	Keith Keane	CM	(Republic of Ireland)	Luton	39	4	0	Preston North End	27 May 2015	Free	30 June 2017
18	George Maris	AM	(England)	Sheffield	30	0	0	Barnsley	3 June 2016	Free	30 June 2017
20	Max Clark	LM	(England)	Kingston upon Hull	30	9	0	Hull City	30 June 2016	6 month loan	1 January 2017
21	Medy Elito	RM	(England)	(Democratic Republic of the Congo) Kinshasa	36	0	0	Newport County	14 July 2015	Free	30 June 2017
24	Conor Newton	CM	(England)	Newcastle upon Tyne	35	22	0	Rotherham United	16 July 2015	Free	30 June 2017
Forwards
9	Barry Corr	CF	(Republic of Ireland)	(Republic of Ireland) Newcastle	41	22	12	Southend United	2 June 2015	Free	30 June 2017
10	Ben Williamson	CF	(England)	Lambeth	37	28	12	Gillingham	15 January 2016	Undisclosed	30 June 2017
17	Adam McGurk	CF	(Northern Ireland)	Larne	37	0	0	Portsmouth	22 July 2016	Undisclosed	30 June 2018
23	Joe Pigott	CF	(England)	Maidstone	32	0	0	Charlton Athletic	8 July 2016	Free	30 June 2017
Out on loan
25	Dylan Williams	RM	(England)	Saffron Walden	18	1	0	Academy	19 April 2016†	Trainee	30 June 2017

* League appearances and goals for the club as of beginning of 2016–17 season.
† Date of first team debut

=== Transfers in ===
Date from	Position	Nationality	Name	From	Fee	Ref.
1 July 2016	RM	(England)	Medy Elito	Newport County	Free transfer	
1 July 2016	GK	(England)	David Gregory	Crystal Palace	Free transfer	
1 July 2016	AM	(England)	George Maris	Barnsley	Free transfer	
1 July 2016	RM	(England)	Piero Mingoia	Accrington Stanley	Free transfer	
8 July 2016	LB	(England)	Blair Adams	Notts County	Free transfer	
8 July 2016	CF	(England)	Joe Pigott	Charlton Athletic	Free transfer	
22 July 2016	CF	(Northern Ireland)	Adam McGurk	Portsmouth	Undisclosed	
24 August 2016	CF	(England)	Uche Ikpeazu	Watford	Free transfer	
30 August 2016	RB	(England)	Brad Halliday	Middlesbrough	Undisclosed	
12 January 2017	LB	(Republic of Ireland)	Jake Carroll	Hartlepool United	Undisclosed	
13 January 2017	CM	(England)	Paul Lewis	Macclesfield Town	Undisclosed	
31 January 2017	CM	(England)	Liam O'Neil	Chesterfield	Undisclosed	

=== Transfers out ===
Date from	Position	Nationality	Name	To	Fee	Ref.
1 July 2016	CF	(England)	James Akintunde	Chester (Note: Following Akintunde's release, he signed for Chester.)	Released	
1 July 2016	GK	(England)	Sam Beasant	Braintree Town (Note: Following Beasant's release, he signed for Braintree Town.)	Released	
1 July 2016	CB	(England)	Danny Burns	Buxton (Note: Following Burns' release, he signed for Buxton.)	Released	
1 July 2016	CF	(England)	Daniel Carr	Dulwich Hamlet	Free transfer	
1 July 2016	GK	(England)	Chris Dunn	Wrexham (Note: Following Dunn's release, he signed for Wrexham.)	Released	
1 July 2016	CF	(England)	Ryan Donaldson	Plymouth Argyle (Note: Following Donaldson's release, he signed for Plymouth Argyle.)	Released	
1 July 2016	CM	(England)	Ryan Horne	Free agent	Released	
1 July 2016	CM	(England)	Matt Lowe	Brackley Town (Note: Following Lowe's release, he signed for Brackley Town.)	Released	
1 July 2016	GK	(England)	Sam McDermid	Free agent	Released	
1 July 2016	CF	(England)	Robbie Simpson	Exeter City (Note: Following Simpson's release, he signed for Exeter City.)	Released	
1 July 2016	CF	(England)	Jimmy Spencer	Plymouth Argyle (Note: Following Spencer's release, he signed for Plymouth Argyle.)	Released	
8 July 2016	LM	(Northern Ireland)	Jeff Hughes	Tranmere Rovers	Free transfer	
3 January 2017	DM	(Republic of Ireland)	Keith Keane	Rochdale	Free transfer	
3 January 2017	RB	(England)	Elliot Omozusi	Whitehawk (Note: Following Omozusi's release, he signed for Whitehawk.)	Released	
27 January 2017	LB	(England)	Blair Adams	Hamilton Academical	Free transfer	

=== Loans in ===
Date from	Position	Nationality	Name	From	Date until	Ref.
1 July 2016	LM	(England)	Max Clark	Hull City	End of season (Note: On 1 January 2016, Max Clark's loan from Hull City was extended until the end of the season.)	
18 July 2016	CB	(England)	Tom Dallison	Brighton & Hove Albion	2 January 2017	
28 July 2016	FB	(Republic of Ireland)	Sean Long	Reading	2 January 2017	
18 August 2016	LW	(Gibraltar)	Jake Gosling	Bristol Rovers	10 November 2016 (Note: On 10 November 2016, Jake Gosling returned to Bristol Rovers before the end of his loan spell.)	
19 January 2017	CB	(England)	Scott Wharton	Blackburn Rovers	End of season	
21 January 2017	CF	(Republic of Ireland)	Gerry McDonagh	Nottingham Forest	End of season	

=== Loans out ===
Date from	Position	Nationality	Name	To	Date until	Ref.
28 July 2016	RM	(England)	Dylan Williams	Wealdstone	2 January 2017	
31 August 2016	CM	(Republic of Ireland)	Keith Keane	Rochdale	2 January 2017	
20 January 2017	DF	(England)	Harry Darling	Bishop's Stortford	19 February 2017	
27 January 2017	CF	(England)	Matt Foy	Cambridge City	26 February 2017	
27 January 2017	CF	(England)	Joe Pigott	Maidstone United	End of season	
4 February 2017	MF	(England)	Fernando Bell-Toxtle	St Neots Town	5 March 2017	
4 February 2017	FW	(England)	Tom Knowles	St Neots Town	5 March 2017	

=== Squad statistics this season ===
No.	Nat.	Player	Pos.	League Two				FA Cup				EFL Cup				EFL Trophy				Total			
No.	Nat.	Player	Pos.	Apps	Goal	Yellow card	Red card	Apps	Goal	Yellow card	Red card	Apps	Goal	Yellow card	Red card	Apps	Goal	Yellow card	Red card	Apps	Goal	Yellow card	Red card
1	(England)	Will Norris	GK	45		3		4		1		1				4				54		4	
2	(England)	Greg Taylor	FB	34+2	2	3		4				1+1				1				41+3	2	3	
3	(England)	Blair Adams	LB	4+2				1+1				2		1		2				9+3		1	
4	(England)	James Dunne	CM	28+5	1	5		4		1		2				3				37+5	1	6	
5	(England)	Mark Roberts	CB	26+1	2	4		4	1											30+1	3	4	
6	(England)	Leon Legge	CB	43+1	6	7	1	4	1			1				3				51+1	7	7	1
7	(England)	Piero Mingoia	RW	40	5	5		4	1			2	1			2+1				48+1	7	5	
8	(England)	Luke Berry	AM	45	17	9		4	4			2	1			0+1				51+1	22	9	
9	(Republic of Ireland)	Barry Corr	CF	1+6	2	1														1+6	2	1	
10	(England)	Ben Williamson	CF	17+16		1		0+4	1			2				3+1				22+21	1	1	
11	(England)	Harrison Dunk	LW	23+15	2	2		2+2								1				26+17	2	2	
12	(Republic of Ireland)	Keith Keane	CM	1																1			
12	(England)	Scott Wharton	CB	9	1	1														9	1	1	
13	(England)	David Gregory	GK	1								1								2			
14	(England)	Josh Coulson	CB	6+1		1		0+1				2				2				10+2		1	
15	(Republic of Ireland)	Sean Long	FB	5+2								1				3+1				9+3			
15	(Republic of Ireland)	Gerry McDonagh	CF	5+8	1	1														5+8	1	1	
16	(England)	Tom Dallison	CB	5								1				3		1		9		1	
16	(England)	Liam O'Neil	CM	13	1	3														13	1	3	
17	(Northern Ireland)	Adam McGurk	CF	7+8																7+8			
18	(England)	George Maris	AM	17+6	4	1		1				0+1		1		2				20+7	4	2	
19	(Gibraltar)	Jake Gosling	LW	3+1								0+1				2				5+2			
19	(Republic of Ireland)	Jake Carroll	LB	19+1		3														19+1		3	
20	(England)	Max Clark	LM	17+10	1	3	1	3				1				4				25+10	1	3	1
21	(England)	Medy Elito	RM	12+11	5	2		1+1	1			2	1			2		1		17+12	7	3	
22	(England)	Elliot Omozusi	RB																				
22	(England)	Paul Lewis	AM	5+8			1 (Note: Overturned on appeal.)													5+8			1
23	(England)	Joe Pigott	CF	5+5		1		0+2				1+1				3	1			9+8	1	1	
24	(England)	Conor Newton	CM	17+10	1	3		1				0+2				1+1				20+13	1	3	
25	(England)	Dylan Williams	RM																				
26	(England)	Uche Ikpeazu	CF	20+9	6	5		4	1							1+2	1			25+11	9	5	
27	(England)	Leon Davies	RB	3+2		1										1+3				4+5		1	
28	(England)	Brad Halliday	RB	30	1	4	1	3								1				34	1	4	1
30	(England)	Finley Iron	GK																				
32	(England)	Harry Darling	DF													0+1				0+1			
35	(England)	Matt Foy	CF													0+1				0+1			
Own goals					0				0				0				1				1		
Totals					58	69	4		10	2	0		3	2	0		3	2	0		74	76	4

=== Suspensions ===
Date Incurred	Name	Games Missed	Reason
1 October 2016	Leon Legge	1	(red card) (vs. Accrington Stanley)
1 October 2016	Brad Halliday	1	(red card) (vs. Accrington Stanley)
22 October 2016	Luke Berry	1	Yellow card
14 March 2017	Max Clark	3	(red card) (vs. Hartlepool United)
1 April 2017	Paul Lewis	0 (Note: On 4 April 2017 it was confirmed that the club's appeal against Paul Lewis' red card had been successful.)	(red card) (vs. Crewe Alexandra)

== Competitions ==
=== Pre-season friendlies ===
9 July 2016 Friendly	St Neots Town	1–2	Cambridge United	St Neots
15:00 BST	Brown 81'	Report	Ward 8' (o.g.); Newton 62'	Stadium: Rowley Park

13 July 2016 Friendly	KFC Uerdingen (Germany)	2–4	Cambridge United	(Germany) Krefeld
19:30 CET	80'; 82'	Report	Pigott 35', 42'; Maris 68'; Berry 79'	Stadium: FC Traar

15 July 2016 Friendly	Al-Shabab (Saudi Arabia)	1–2	Cambridge United	(Netherlands) Eindhoven
10:30 CET	Benyettou 42'	Report	Coulson 7'; Darling 65'

16 July 2016 Friendly	SG Wattenscheid (Germany)	3–3	Cambridge United	(Germany) Wattenscheid
15:00 CET	4'; 25'; 74'	Report	Maris 7'; Berry 48'; Pigott 62'	Stadium: Platzanlage Espeloh

19 July 2016 Friendly	Newmarket Town	0–4	Cambridge United	Newmarket
19:15 BST		Report	Foy 1'; Pigott 2', 49'; Newton 35'	Stadium: Cricket Field Road; Attendance: 726

23 July 2016 Friendly	Cambridge United	1–1	Ipswich Town	Cambridge
15:00 BST	Pigott 89'	Report	Dozzell 83'	Stadium: Abbey Stadium; Attendance: 2,572 (630 away)

26 July 2016 Friendly	Cambridge United	0–3	Aston Villa	Cambridge
19:30 BST		Report	Sinclair 7'; Hepburn-Murphy 8'; Gardner 78'	Stadium: Abbey Stadium; Attendance: 3,961 (816 away)

30 July 2016 Friendly	Braintree Town	P–P	Cambridge United	Braintree
15:00 BST				Stadium: Cressing Road

=== League Two ===
==== League table ====
Pos	Team	Pld	W	D	L	GF	GA	GD	Pts
9	Wycombe Wanderers	46	19	12	15	58	53	+5	69
10	Stevenage	46	20	7	19	67	63	+4	67
11	Cambridge United	46	19	9	18	58	50	+8	66
12	Mansfield Town	46	17	15	14	54	50	+4	66
13	Accrington Stanley	46	17	14	15	59	56	+3	65

Updated to match(es) played on 6 May 2017. Source: BBC Sport
Rules for classification: 1) Points; 2) Goal difference; 3) Number of goals scored

==== Results summary ====
Overall								Home						Away					
Pld	W	D	L	GF	GA	GD	Pts	W	D	L	GF	GA	GD	W	D	L	GF	GA	GD
46	19	9	18	58	50	+8	66	9	5	9	30	26	+4	10	4	9	28	24	+4

Last updated: 6 May 2017.
Source: BBC Sport

==== Results by matchday ====
Matchday	1	2	3	4	5	6	7	8	9	10	11	12	13	14	15	16	17	18	19	20	21	22	23	24	25	26	27	28	29	30	31	32	33	34	35	36	37	38	39	40	41	42	43	44	45	46
Ground	H	A	A	H	H	A	A	H	A	H	H	A	H	A	H	A	H	A	H	A	H	A	A	H	H	H	A	H	A	A	H	A	H	H	A	H	A	H	A	A	H	A	H	A	H	A
Result	D	L	L	D	L	D	L	L	W	W	W	D	L	W	L	W	L	W	W	W	W	W	D	W	D	L	L	L	L	D	W	W	L	D	W	L	W	D	L	W	W	L	W	L	W	L
Position	10	21	22	24	24	24	24	24	24	21	19	17	21	18	22	17	19	14	11	9	7	7	7	7	8	10	11	12	14	14	13	10	12	12	12	12	12	12	12	11	9	11	9	11	9	11

Updated to match(es) played on 6 May 2017. Source: BBC Sport
A = Away; H = Home; W = Win; D = Draw; L = Loss

==== Matches ====
On 22 June 2016, the fixtures for the forthcoming season were announced.

===== August =====
6 August 2016 1	Cambridge United	1–1	Barnet	Cambridge
15:00 BST	Mingoia 61'	Report	Togwell (yellow card) 70'; Nicholls 75'	Stadium: Abbey Stadium; Attendance: 4,873 (590 away); Referee: Graham Horwood

13 August 2016 2	Colchester United	2–0	Cambridge United	Colchester
15:00 BST	Dickenson 8'; Wright (yellow card) 69'; Johnstone 82'	Report	Berry (yellow card) 90'	Stadium: Colchester Community Stadium; Attendance: 4,521 (1,098 away); Referee: Ollie Yates

16 August 2016 3	Doncaster Rovers	1–0	Cambridge United	Doncaster
19:45 BST	Marquis (penalty missed) 10' 74'; Butler (yellow card) 53'; Coppinger (yellow card) 55'; Wright (yellow card) 89'	Report	Norris (yellow card) 2'; Coulson (yellow card) 23'; Pigott (yellow card) 88'	Stadium: Keepmoat Stadium; Attendance: 4,768 (393 away); Referee: Darren Handley

20 August 2016 4	Cambridge United	2–2	Carlisle United	Cambridge
15:00 BST	Legge 7'; Elito (yellow card) 23'; Dunne (yellow card) 37'; Berry 41' (pen.) (yellow card) 68'	Report	Kennedy 23' (yellow card) 54'; Wyke 59'	Stadium: Abbey Stadium; Attendance: 4,139 (405 away); Referee: Brett Huxtable

27 August 2016 5	Cambridge United	0–3	Luton Town	Cambridge
15:00 BST	Clark (yellow card) 34'	Report	O'Donnell (yellow card) 40'; Rea (yellow card) 60'; Coulson 62' (o.g.); Marriott 63'; Hylton (yellow card) 86' (goal) 90+6'	Stadium: Abbey Stadium; Attendance: 5,606 (1,690 away); Referee: David Webb

===== September =====
3 September 2016 6	Mansfield Town	0–0	Cambridge United	Mansfield
15:00 BST	Taft (yellow card) 52'; Pearce (yellow card) 86'	Report	Berry (yellow card) 90+4'	Stadium: Field Mill; Attendance: 2,981 (334 away); Referee: Dean Whitestone

10 September 2016 7	Plymouth Argyle	2–1	Cambridge United	Plymouth
15:00 BST	Carey 9'; Slew 59'	Report	Elito 79'	Stadium: Home Park; Attendance: 7,068 (144 away); Referee: Lee Probert

17 September 2016 8	Cambridge United	1–2	Morecambe	Cambridge
15:00 BST	Mingoia 36'; Williamson (yellow card) 53'	Report	Dunn 62' (pen.); Mullin 64'; Winnard (yellow card) 79'	Stadium: Abbey Stadium; Attendance: 4,110 (56 away); Referee: Darren England

24 September 2016 9	Newport County	1–2	Cambridge United	Newport
15:00 BST	Healey 10'; Tozer (yellow card) 58'; Grego-Cox (yellow card) 74'	Report	McGurk (yellow card) 58'; Legge (yellow card) 60'; Ikpeazu 61'; Clark (yellow card) 81'; Berry 83'	Stadium: Rodney Parade; Attendance: 2,225 (141 away); Referee: Nick Kinseley

27 September 2016 10	Cambridge United	1–0	Yeovil Town	Cambridge
19:45 BST	Berry (yellow card) 38'; Roberts 65'	Report	Lacey (yellow card) 35'; Shephard (yellow card) 55'; Dawson (yellow card) 73'	Stadium: Abbey Stadium; Attendance: 3,556 (98 away); Referee: Mark Haywood

===== October =====
1 October 2016 11	Cambridge United	2–1	Accrington Stanley	Cambridge
15:00 BST	Legge 14' (yellow card) 23' (yellow-red card) 90'; Mingoia 81'; Halliday (red card) 90+2'	Report	Kee 51'; Donacien (yellow card) 53'; Clark (yellow card) 68'; McConville (yellow card) 70'; Eagles (penalty missed) 90+1'; Gornell (penalty missed) 90+2'	Stadium: Abbey Stadium; Attendance: 3,765 (98 away); Referee: Ollie Yates

8 October 2016 12	Blackpool	1–1	Cambridge United	Blackpool
15:00 BST	Robertson (yellow card) 29'; Philliskirk (penalty missed) 33'; Vassell (yellow card) 86'; Taylor 90+2'	Report	Berry 17'; Dunk (yellow card) 33'	Stadium: Bloomfield Road; Attendance: 3,070 (477 away); Referee: Richard Clark

15 October 2016 13	Cambridge United	0–1	Grimsby Town	Cambridge
15:00 BST	Dunne (yellow card) 49'; Roberts (yellow card) 82'; Clark (yellow card) 87'	Report	Berrett 26'; Tuton (yellow card) 90+2'	Stadium: Abbey Stadium; Attendance: 5,121 (1,149 away); Referee: Charles Breakspear

22 October 2016 14	Exeter City	1–2	Cambridge United	Exeter
15:00 BST	Moore-Taylor (yellow card) 37'; Simpson 73'	Report	Berry 7' (yellow card) 57'; Dunk 10'; Ikpeazu (yellow card) 38'; Norris (yellow card) 90'	Stadium: St James Park; Attendance: 3,485 (172 away); Referee: Robert Jones

29 October 2016 15	Cambridge United	0–1	Portsmouth	Cambridge
15:00 BST	Dunne (yellow card) 25'; Halliday (yellow card) 80'; Ikpeazu (yellow card) 85'	Report	Chaplin 24' (yellow card) 39'; Linganzi (red card) 61'; Doyle (yellow card) 77'; Hunt (yellow card) 90+1'; Roberts (yellow card) 90+4'	Stadium: Abbey Stadium; Attendance: 6,397 (1,850 away); Referee: Ross Joyce

===== November =====
12 November 2016 16	Crawley Town	1–3	Cambridge United	Crawley
15:00 GMT	Collins 8'; Yussuf (yellow card) 59'; Djaló (yellow card) 60'; Roberts (yellow card) 80'	Report	Taylor 19' (yellow card) 64'; Ikpeazu 28' (yellow card) 83'; Berry 51'; Dunne (yellow card) 90+4'	Stadium: Broadfield Stadium; Attendance: 2,408 (328 away); Referee: John Busby

19 November 2016 17	Cambridge United	1–2	Wycombe Wanderers	Cambridge
15:00 GMT	Roberts (yellow card) 21'; Legge (yellow card) 60'; Maris 87'	Report	Hayes 6' (pen.); Pierre (yellow card) 22' (goal) 90+5'; Gape (yellow card) 53'; O'Nien (yellow card) 57'; Stewart (yellow card) 63'	Stadium: Abbey Stadium; Attendance: 4,139 (437 away); Referee: Trevor Kettle

22 November 2016 18	Notts County	0–1	Cambridge United	Nottingham
19:45 GMT	O'Connor (yellow card) 30'; Milsom (yellow card) 77'; Dickinson (yellow card) 88'	Report	Newton 26'; Norris (yellow card) 90+3'	Stadium: Meadow Lane; Attendance: 2,736 (326 away); Referee: David Webb

26 November 2016 19	Cambridge United	3–1	Cheltenham Town	Cambridge
15:00 GMT	Ikpeazu 7' (yellow card) 62'; Berry 56', 74'	Report	Parslow (yellow card) 32'; Wright (yellow card) 63'; Dayton (yellow card) 64'; Waters 85'	Stadium: Abbey Stadium; Attendance: 4,606 (200 away); Referee: Ross Joyce

===== December =====
10 December 2016 20	Hartlepool United	0–5	Cambridge United	Hartlepool
15:00 GMT	Nsiala (yellow card) 46'	Report	Halliday (yellow card) 41'; Dunne 51'; Dunk (yellow card) 58'; Berry 62'; Legge 66'; Ikpeazu 70'; Clark 88'	Stadium: Victoria Park; Attendance: 3,261 (205 away); Referee: Carl Boyeson

17 December 2016 21	Cambridge United	2–1	Crewe Alexandra	Cambridge
15:00 GMT	Ikpeazu 51'; Taylor 60'	Report	Jones 68'	Stadium: Abbey Stadium; Attendance: 4,167 (221 away); Referee: Lee Collins

26 December 2016 22	Stevenage	1–2	Cambridge United	Stevenage
15:00 GMT	Kennedy 46'; Wilkinson (yellow card) 58'; King (yellow card) 74'	Report	Roberts (yellow card) 14'; Legge 21'; Mingoia 82'	Stadium: Broadhall Way; Attendance: 3,957 (1,321 away); Referee: Dean Whitestone

31 December 2016 23	Leyton Orient	1–1	Cambridge United	Waltham Forest
13:00 GMT	Judd (yellow card) 70'; McCallum (yellow card) 84'; Palmer 90+4'	Report	Dunk 21'; Mingoia (yellow card) 54'; Halliday (yellow card) 71'	Stadium: Brisbane Road; Attendance: 5,897 (1,391 away); Referee: Lee Swabey

===== January =====
2 January 2017 24	Cambridge United	4–0	Notts County	Cambridge
15:00 GMT	Berry 18', 61'; Ikpeazu 57'; Mingoia (yellow card) 65' (goal) 69'	Report		Stadium: Abbey Stadium; Attendance: 4,981 (360 away); Referee: Brett Huxtable

7 January 2017	Accrington Stanley	P–P	Cambridge United	Accrington
15:00 GMT				Stadium: Crown Ground

14 January 2017 25	Cambridge United	0–0	Blackpool	Cambridge
15:00 GMT	Berry (penalty missed) 76'	Report	Potts (yellow card) 43'; McAlister (yellow card) 57'; Payne (yellow card) 68'; Aldred (red card) 76'; Aimson (yellow card) 90+3'	Stadium: Abbey Stadium; Attendance: 4,248 (328 away); Referee: Darren Drysdale

21 January 2017 26	Cambridge United	1–3	Mansfield Town	Cambridge
15:00 GMT	Maris 8'; Dunne (yellow card) 19'; Ikpeazu (yellow card) 83'	Report	Legge 43' (o.g.); Pearce 58'; Coulthirst 73'	Stadium: Abbey Stadium; Attendance: 4,211 (307 away); Referee: Gavin Ward

28 January 2017 27	Luton Town	2–0	Cambridge United	Luton
15:00 GMT	Vassell 33'; Cook 82' (pen.)	Report	Carroll (yellow card) 59'; Newton (yellow card) 67'; Legge (yellow card) 71'	Stadium: Kenilworth Road; Attendance: 8,917 (997 away); Referee: Seb Stockbridge

===== February =====
4 February 2017 28	Cambridge United	0–1	Plymouth Argyle	Cambridge
15:00 GMT	Legge (yellow card) 90+4'	Report	Sarcevic 41'; Sawyer (yellow card) 81'; McCormick (yellow card) 90+1'	Stadium: Abbey Stadium; Attendance: 5,084 (837 away); Referee: John Brooks

11 February 2017 29	Morecambe	2–0	Cambridge United	Morecambe
15:00 GMT	Murphy (yellow card) 9'; Ellison 50', 55'	Report	Berry (yellow card) 43'; Mingoia (yellow card) 90'	Stadium: Globe Arena; Attendance: 2,162 (168 away); Referee: Nigel Miller

14 February 2017 30	Yeovil Town	1–1	Cambridge United	Yeovil
19:45 GMT	Dawson (yellow card) 48'; Lawless (yellow card) 59'; Zoko 78'	Report	O'Neil (yellow card) 57'; Corr 89'	Stadium: Huish Park; Attendance: 2,847 (118 away); Referee: Brett Huxtable

18 February 2017 31	Cambridge United	3–2	Newport County	Cambridge
15:00 GMT	Corr 63' (yellow card) 82'; Legge 72'; Roberts 90+3'	Report	Bird 50', 55' (yellow card) 90+7'; Rose (red card) 90'	Stadium: Abbey Stadium; Attendance: 4,175 (153 away); Referee: Trevor Kettle

21 February 2017	Accrington Stanley	P–P	Cambridge United	Accrington
19:45 GMT				Stadium: Crown Ground

25 February 2017 32	Barnet	0–1	Cambridge United	Barnet
15:00 GMT	Vilhete (yellow card) 57'; Bover (yellow card) 67'	Report	Legge (yellow card) 19'; Mingoia (yellow card) 23'; Carroll (yellow card) 43'; Roberts (yellow card) 49'; Berry 65'; Elito (yellow card) 90+1'; Taylor (yellow card) 90+3'	Stadium: Hive Stadium; Attendance: 2,396 (913 away); Referee: Charles Breakspear

28 February 2017 33	Cambridge United	2–3	Doncaster Rovers	Cambridge
19:45 GMT	Legge (yellow card) 70'; Maris 78'; Berry 90+2'	Report	Rowe 18'; Baudry 23'; Marquis 71' (pen.)	Stadium: Abbey Stadium; Attendance: 4,236 (410 away); Referee: Ross Joyce

===== March =====
4 March 2017 34	Cambridge United	1–1	Colchester United	Cambridge
15:00 GMT	McDonagh 20'; Berry (yellow card) 31'; Davies (yellow card) 90+1'	Report	Szmodics 84'	Stadium: Abbey Stadium; Attendance: 5,708 (1,415 away); Referee: Eddie Ilderton

11 March 2017 35	Carlisle United	0–3	Cambridge United	Carlisle
15:00 GMT	Brisley (yellow card) 70'; Waring (yellow card) 87'; Bailey (red card) 90+2'	Report	Elito 66' (pen.), 71' (pen.), 90+5'; Mingoia (yellow card) 75'; Maris (yellow card) 83'	Stadium: Brunton Park; Attendance: 4,427 (207 away); Referee: Robert Jones

14 March 2017 36	Cambridge United	0–1	Hartlepool United	Cambridge
19:45 GMT	Clark (red card) 71'	Report	Richardson (yellow card) 32'; Woods (yellow card) 61' (goal) 63'; Alessandra (yellow card) 84'; Thomas (yellow card) 86'	Stadium: Abbey Stadium; Attendance: 3,824 (101 away); Referee: Dean Whitestone

18 March 2017 37	Cheltenham Town	0–1	Cambridge United	Cheltenham
15:00 GMT		Report	Elito 2'; Wharton (yellow card) 18'; Berry (yellow card) 90'	Stadium: Whaddon Road; Attendance: 2,905 (349 away); Referee: Michael Salisbury

25 March 2017 38	Cambridge United	0–0	Stevenage	Cambridge
15:00 GMT		Report	Schumacher (yellow card) 67'	Stadium: Abbey Stadium; Attendance: 5,520 (999 away); Referee: Mark Haywood

28 March 2017 39	Accrington Stanley	2–0	Cambridge United	Accrington
19:45 GMT	McConville 19'; McCartan 54'	Report	Berry (yellow card) 33'	Stadium: Crown Ground; Attendance: 1,333 (188 away); Referee: John Busby

===== April =====
1 April 2017 40	Crewe Alexandra	1–2	Cambridge United	Crewe
15:00 BST	Turton (yellow card) 9'; Legge 58' (o.g.); Nugent (yellow card) 71'	Report	Berry 37', 72'; Lewis (red card) 90+1'	Stadium: Gresty Road; Attendance: 3,759 (330 away); Referee: Seb Stockbridge

8 April 2017 41	Cambridge United	3–0	Leyton Orient	Cambridge
15:00 BST	Newton (yellow card) 29'; Berry 31'; O'Neil 41'; Maris 53'	Report	Kelly (yellow card) 88'	Stadium: Abbey Stadium; Attendance: 4,681 (641 away); Referee: Nick Kinseley

14 April 2017 42	Grimsby Town	2–1	Cambridge United	Grimsby
15:00 BST	Berrett (yellow card) 23'; Dyson 57' (pen.); Jones (yellow card) 66'; Clements 84'	Report	Halliday 90'	Stadium: Blundell Park; Attendance: 5,166 (469 away); Referee: Andy Haines

17 April 2017 43	Cambridge United	1–0	Exeter City	Cambridge
19:45 BST	Legge 29' (yellow card) 80'; O'Neil (yellow card) 74'; Carroll (yellow card) 90+4'	Report	Archibald-Henville (yellow card) 23'; Taylor (yellow card) 55'; Croll (yellow card) 90+1'	Stadium: Abbey Stadium; Attendance: 6,130 (534 away); Referee: Darren Deadman

22 April 2017 44	Portsmouth	2–1	Cambridge United	Portsmouth
15:00 BST	Baker (yellow card) 9' (goal) 20'; Naismith 51'; Whatmough (yellow card) 90+3'; Forde (yellow card) 90+5'	Report	O'Neil (yellow card) 53'; Berry 80'	Stadium: Fratton Park; Attendance: 18,165 (622 away); Referee: Gavin Ward

29 April 2017 45	Cambridge United	2–0	Crawley Town	Cambridge
15:00 BST	Wharton 35'; Legge (yellow card) 45'; McDonagh (yellow card) 62'; Berry 90' (pen.)	Report	Djaló (yellow card) 3'; Blackman (yellow card) 45+1'; Smith (yellow card) 45'; Payne (red card) 89'	Stadium: Abbey Stadium; Attendance: 5,675 (177 away); Referee: Brett Huxtable

===== May =====
6 May 2017 46	Wycombe Wanderers	1–0	Cambridge United	High Wycombe
17:30 BST	Kashket 65'; Bean (yellow card) 69'; Jombati (yellow card) 84'; Cowan-Hall (yellow card) 90+3'	Report	Halliday (yellow card) 13'; Taylor (yellow card) 79'	Stadium: Adams Park; Attendance: 6,313 (1,352 away); Referee: Mark Heywood

=== FA Cup ===
On 15 October 2016, in the first round draw for the FA Cup Cambridge United were drawn at home against Dover Athletic.

5 November 2016 First round	Cambridge United	1–1	Dover Athletic	Cambridge
15:00 GMT	Mingoia 38'	Report	Thomas (yellow card) 67'; Modeste (yellow card) 70'; Magri (yellow card) 79'; Miller 82'	Stadium: Abbey Stadium; Attendance: 2,620 (515 away); Referee: Nick Kinseley

17 November 2016 First round replay	Dover Athletic	2–4 (a.e.t.)	Cambridge United	Dover
19:45 GMT	Miller 70'; Thomas 102'	Report	Norris (yellow card) 72'; Roberts 90+2'; Legge 110'; Dunne (yellow card) 113'; Elito 118'; Williamson 120+1'	Stadium: Crabble Athletic Ground; Attendance: 1,158; Referee: Charles Breakspear

4 December 2016 Second round	Cambridge United	4–0	Coventry City	Cambridge
14:00 GMT	Berry 7', 29' (pen.), 38', 86'	Report	Maycock (yellow card) 43'; Turnbull (yellow card) 84'; Gadzhev (yellow card) 90+2'	Stadium: Abbey Stadium; Attendance: 4,283 (745 away); Referee: Keith Stroud

9 January 2017 Third round	Cambridge United	1–2	Leeds United	Cambridge
19:45 GMT	Ikpeazu 25'	Report	Dallas 56'; Mowatt 63'; Phillips (yellow card) 22'; Jansson (yellow card) 25'; Berardi (yellow card) 28'	Stadium: Abbey Stadium; Attendance: 7,973 (1,414 away); Referee: Craig Pawson

=== EFL Cup ===
On 22 June 2016, in the first round draw for the EFL Cup Cambridge United were drawn at home against Sheffield Wednesday.

9 August 2016 First round	Cambridge United	2–1	Sheffield Wednesday	Cambridge
19:45 BST	Mingoia 90+1'; Maris (yellow card) 90+4'; Berry 118'		João 52'; Hélan (yellow card) 105'	Stadium: Abbey Stadium; Attendance: 4,170 (1,405 away); Referee: Keith Stroud

23 August 2016 Second round	Wolverhampton Wanderers	2–1	Cambridge United	Wolverhampton
19:45 BST	Costa 6'; Wallace 13'; Henry (penalty missed) 57'	Report	Elito 14'; Adams (yellow card) 56'	Stadium: Molineux Stadium; Attendance: 9,500 (392 away); Referee: Brendan Malone

=== EFL Trophy ===
On 27 July 2016 the draw for the group stages of the EFL Trophy was made. Cambridge United were drawn in Northern Group G along with Middlesbrough academy, Scunthorpe United and Shrewsbury Town.

Pos	Div	Team	Pld	W	PW	PL	L	GF	GA	GD	Pts	Qualification
1	L1	Scunthorpe United	3	3	0	0	0	6	1	+5	9	Advance to Round 2
2	L2	Cambridge United	3	2	0	0	1	3	3	0	6	Advance to Round 2
3	L1	Shrewsbury Town	3	1	0	0	2	3	3	0	3	
4	ACA	Middlesbrough U21	3	0	0	0	3	2	7	−5	0	

Source: Sky Sports

30 August 2016 Group stage 1	Shrewsbury Town	0–1	Cambridge United	Shrewsbury
19:45 BST		Report	Pigott 20'; Dallison (yellow card) 77'	Stadium: New Meadow; Attendance: 1,187 (63 away); Referee: Chris Sarginson

4 October 2016 Group stage 2	Cambridge United	2–1	Middlesbrough U23	Cambridge
19:00 BST	Ikpeazu 12'; Elsdon 55' (o.g.)	Report	Tavernier 34'	Stadium: Abbey Stadium; Attendance: 693 (27 away); Referee: John Busby

8 November 2016 Group stage 3	Cambridge United	0–2	Scunthorpe United	Cambridge
19:45 GMT	Elito (yellow card) 68'	Report	Williams 36'; Adelakun 90+1'	Stadium: Abbey Stadium; Attendance: 666 (86 away); Referee: Darren Deadman

7 December 2016 Second round	Bradford City	1–0	Cambridge United	Bradford
19:45 GMT	Law 64'; Clarke (yellow card) 74'; McMahon (yellow card) 83'	Report		Stadium: Valley Parade; Attendance: 1,360 (70 away); Referee: Rob Lewis
