= Dan Happe =

English footballer

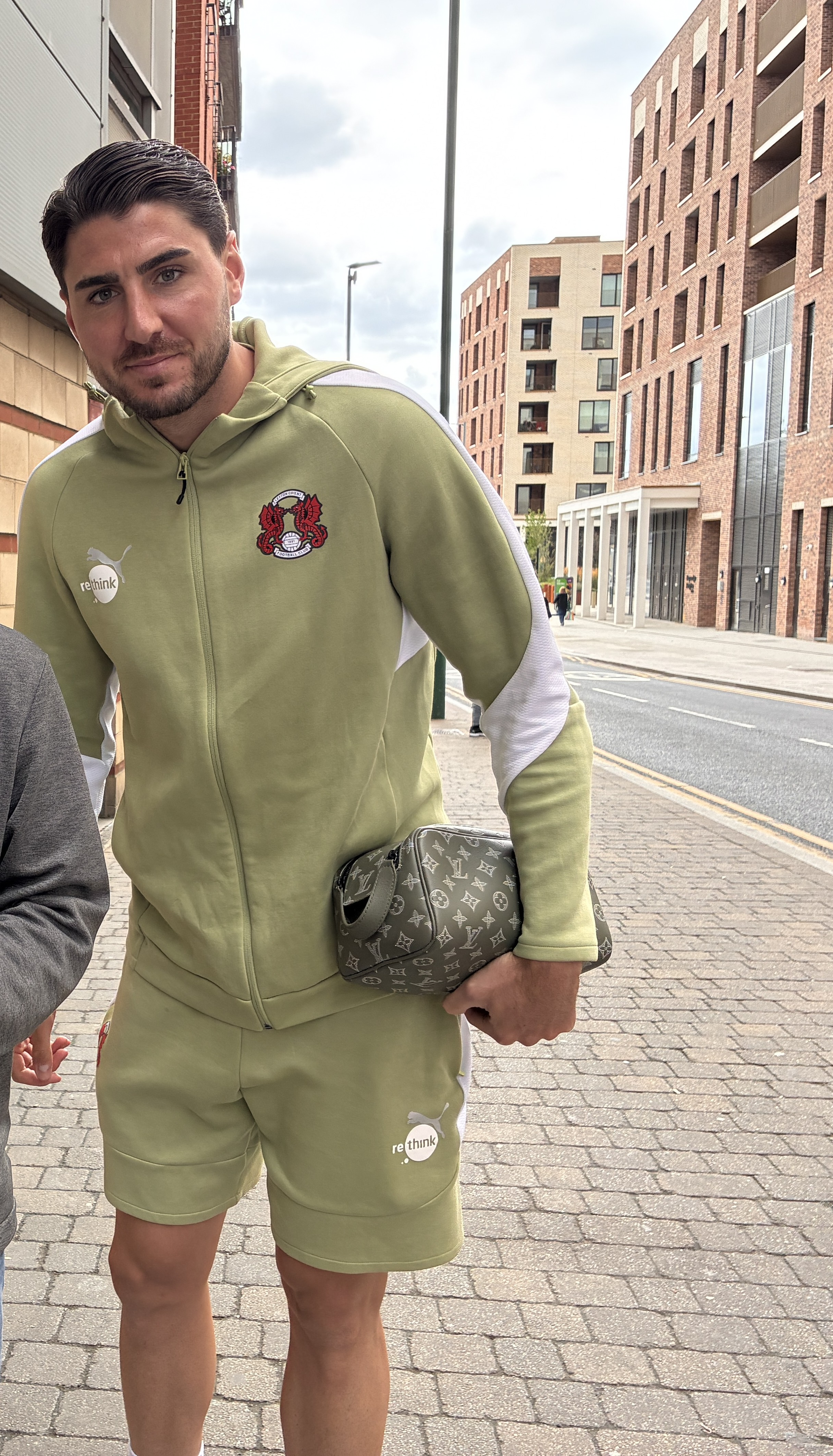
- Happe with Leyton Orient in 2025

Personal information
- Full name: Daniel Keith Happe
- Date of birth: 28 September 1998 (age 28)
- Place of birth: Tower Hamlets, England
- Height: 6 ft 6 in (1.98 m)
- Position: Defender

Team information
- Current team: Aberdeen
- Number: 26

Youth career
- –2017: Leyton Orient

Senior career*
Years	Team	Apps	(Gls)
2017–2026	Leyton Orient	251	(7)
2017	→ Histon (loan)	2	(0)
2026–	Aberdeen	7	(0)

International career^{‡}
2019	England C	1	(0)
- * Club domestic league appearances and goals as of 18:00, 1 November 2026 (UTC) ‡ National team caps and goals as of 23:29, 18 January 2021 (UTC)

Daniel Keith Happe (born 28 September 1998) is an English professional footballer who plays as a defender for Scottish Premiership club Aberdeen.

== Career ==
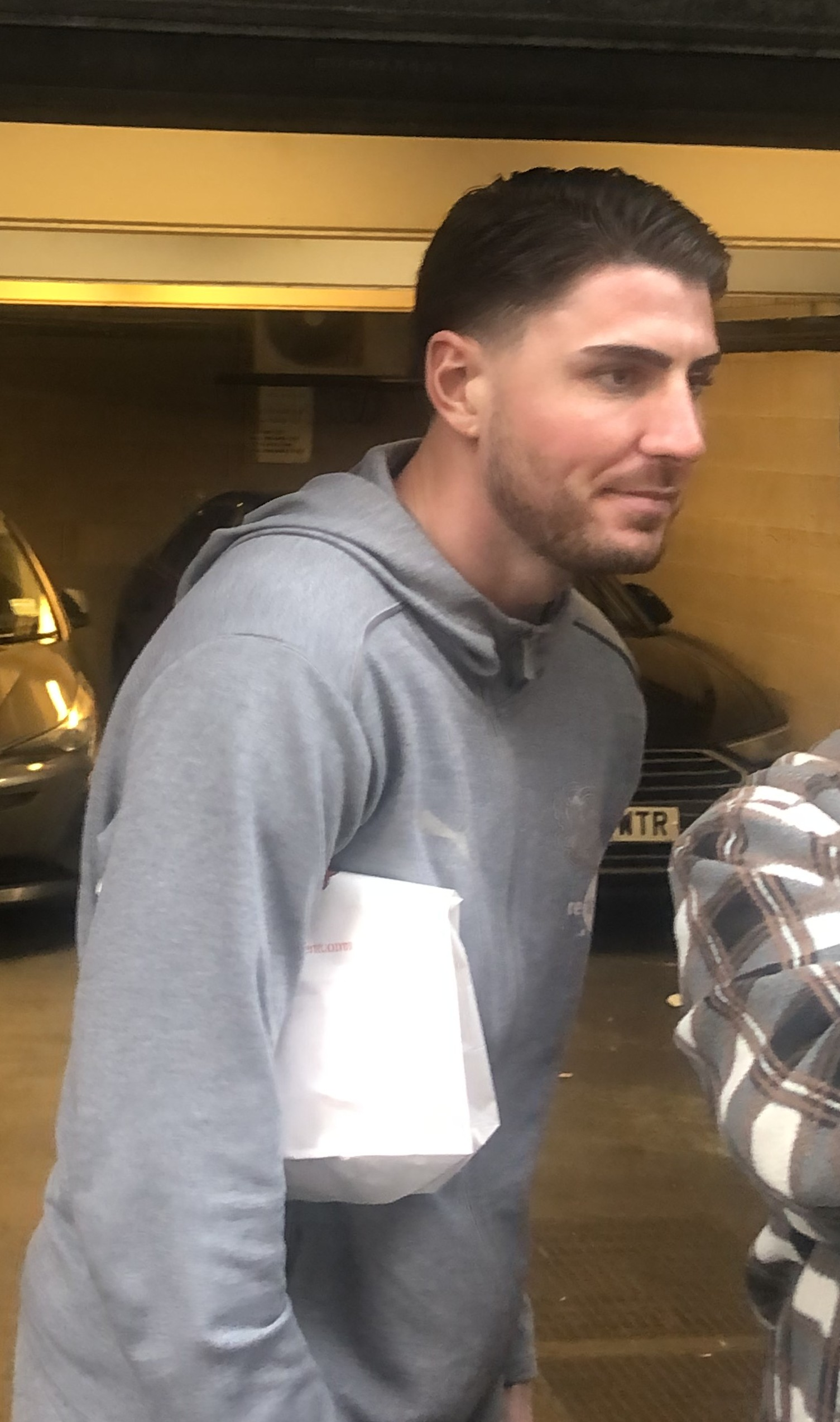
Happe with Leyton Orient in 2025.

On 13 January 2017, Happe joined Southern League Division One Central club Histon on loan and appeared as a last minute substitute in the 3–2 win at Uxbridge the following day. He also appeared as a substitute in the 2–1 win at Kidlington on 28 January.

Happe was drafted into the Leyton Orient first team squad in February 2017, and made his debut and his first senior start in the 3–0 league defeat at Cambridge United on 8 April 2017.

He signed his first professional contract in October 2017, tying him to Leyton Orient until the end of the 2019–20 season. He signed a new contract in July 2019, until 2021. Happe was a member of the Leyton Orient side that won the 2022–23 EFL League Two title. In June 2024, he signed a new two-year contract with Orient.

== Career statistics ==
As of end of 2023–24 season

Appearances and goals by club, season and competition
Club	Season	League			FA Cup		EFL Cup		Other		Total	
Club	Season	Division	Apps	Goals	Apps	Goals	Apps	Goals	Apps	Goals	Apps	Goals
Leyton Orient	2016–17	League Two	2	0	0	0	0	0	0	0	2	0
Leyton Orient	2017–18	National League	26	0	2	0	—		4 (Note: Appearance(s) in FA Trophy)	0	32	0
Leyton Orient	2018–19	National League	20	1	1	0	—		7	1	28	2
Leyton Orient	2019–20	League Two	32	1	1	0	1	0	3 (Note: Appearance(s) in EFL Trophy)	1	37	2
Leyton Orient	2020–21	League Two	40	3	0	0	1	0	2	0	43	3
Leyton Orient	2021–22	League Two	12	0	1	0	1	0	4	1	18	1
Leyton Orient	2022–23	League Two	25	0	0	0	0	0	0	0	25	0
Leyton Orient	2023–24	League One	30	0	2	0	1	0	2	0	35	0
Total			187	5	7	0	4	0	22	3	220	8
Histon (loan)	2016–17	Southern League Division One Central	2	0	0	0	0	0	0	0	2	0
Career total			189	5	7	0	4	0	22	3	222	8

== Honours ==
Leyton Orient

- EFL League Two: 2022–23
- National League: 2018–19
- FA Trophy runner-up: 2018–19
