= Sam Ling =

English footballer (born 1996)

Personal information
- Full name: Samuel Jack Ling
- Date of birth: 17 December 1996 (age 29)
- Place of birth: Broxbourne, England
- Height: 1.75 m (5 ft 9 in)
- Position: Right-back

Team information
- Current team: Hornchurch
- Number: 19

Youth career
- 2013–2016: Leyton Orient

Senior career*
Years	Team	Apps	(Gls)
2013–2016	Leyton Orient	0	(0)
2015	→ Grays Athletic (loan)	0	(0)
2016	→ Histon (loan)	7	(1)
2016–2018	Dagenham & Redbridge	40	(3)
2018–2021	Leyton Orient	80	(1)
2021–2025	Dagenham & Redbridge	119	(4)
2026–	Hornchurch	15	(0)

International career
2018	England C	2	(0)
- * Club domestic league appearances and goals as of 01:52, 11 May 2026 (UTC)

Samuel Jack Ling (born 17 December 1996) is an English professional footballer who plays as a defender for National League club Hornchurch.

== Career ==
Ling began his career at Leyton Orient, progressing through the O's academy to become Youth Team captain and also featured on the bench for the first-team a number of times. He moved to Dagenham & Redbridge in 2016. On 7 February 2018, he returned to fellow National League and former club Leyton Orient for an undisclosed fee, signing a two-and-a-half-year contract. Ling was one of a number of players to leave Dagenham due to the club's financial issues. His father, Martin, was also director of football at Orient. He made his long-awaited debut for the club on 17 February, coming on as a substitute in the second-half against Chester. He scored his first goal for the club on 15 March 2019 in a 3–2 away win at Barrow. He played a key role at right-back as Orient won the National League title at the end of the 2018–19 season. Ling started the 2019–20 season well and was nominated for the Orient's Player of the Month award in August. On 9 September 2019 he signed a new one-year extension to his contract until the summer of 2021. He had been an ever-present in the side since promotion and their return to the English Football League. He made his 50th appearance for the club on 21 September 2019 in a 2–1 defeat to Colchester United. He made a total of 87 appearances for Orient in three and a half seasons before he was released in the summer of 2021 following the expiration of his contract.

On 9 July 2021, Ling returned to National League club Dagenham & Redbridge on a free transfer. Daggers boss, Daryl McMahon, spoke of his acquisition, "He obviously comes from a good footballing family, with his dad Martin. I've known Sam since he was about five or six, from when I played for Martin at Leyton Orient. He's been at the football club before and did really well here, so we know what we're getting." He left after the end of the 2024–25 season.

He joined National League South club Hornchurch on 13 January 2026, and he debuted on 24 January 2026 during the 2–1 victory against Weston-super-Mare. His first goal for Hornchurch was scored on 9 May 2026 and it was the winning goal in the 3–2 victory against Torquay United during the promotion play-off final which saw Hornchurch promoted to the National League for the first time in their history.

== Personal life ==
His father is Martin Ling.

== Career statistics ==
As of match played 9 May 2026

Appearances and goals by club, season and competition
Club	Season	League			FA Cup		EFL Cup		Other		Total	
Club	Season	Division	Apps	Goals	Apps	Goals	Apps	Goals	Apps	Goals	Apps	Goals
Leyton Orient	2013–14	League One	0	0	0	0	0	0	0	0	0	0
Leyton Orient	2014–15	League One	0	0	0	0	0	0	0	0	0	0
Leyton Orient	2015–16	League Two	0	0	0	0	0	0	0	0	0	0
Leyton Orient	Total		0	0	0	0	0	0	0	0	0	0
Grays Athletic (loan)	2014–15	IL Premier Division	0	0	—		—		—		0	0
Histon (loan)	2015–16	SL Premier Division	7	1	—		—		—		7	1
Dagenham & Redbridge	2016–17	National League	11	0	1	0	—		0	0	12	0
Dagenham & Redbridge	2017–18	National League	29	3	2	0	—		1 (Note: Appearances in promotion play-offs)	0	32	3
Dagenham & Redbridge	Total		40	3	3	0	—		1	0	44	3
Leyton Orient	2017–18	National League	13	0	0	0	—		0	0	13	0
Leyton Orient	2018–19	National League	22	1	1	0	—		4	0	27	1
Leyton Orient	2019–20	League Two	15	0	1	0	0	0	2 (Note: Appearances in EFL Trophy)	0	18	0
Leyton Orient	2020–21	League Two	30	0	0	0	1	0	3	1	34	1
Leyton Orient	Total		80	1	2	0	1	0	9	1	92	2
Dagenham & Redbridge	2021–22	National League	32	2	2	0	—		3	0	37	2
Dagenham & Redbridge	2022–23	National League	34	1	1	0	—		1	0	36	1
Dagenham & Redbridge	2023–24	National League	40	1	0	0	—		1	1	41	2
Dagenham & Redbridge	2024–25	National League	13	0	0	0	—		0	0	13	0
Dagenham & Redbridge	Total		119	4	3	0	—		5	1	127	5
Hornchurch	2025–26	National League South	15	0	—		—		2	1	17	1
Career total			261	9	8	0	1	0	17	3	287	12

== Honours ==
Leyton Orient

- National League: 2018–19
- FA Trophy runner-up: 2018–19

Hornchurch

- National League South play-offs: 2026
