= Piero Mingoia =

English footballer (born 1991)

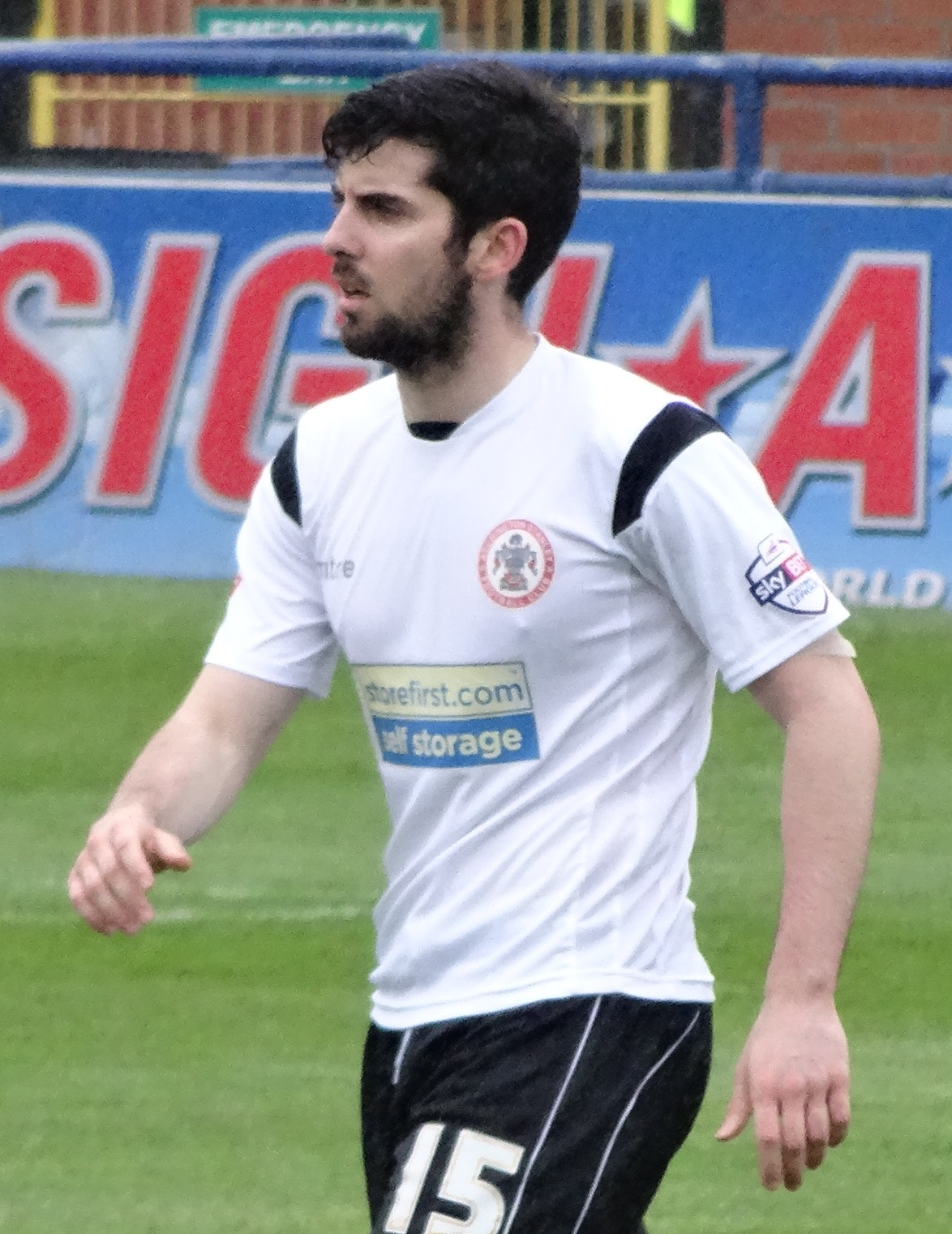
- Mingoia playing for Accrington Stanley in 2014

Personal information
- Full name: Piero Mingoia
- Date of birth: 20 October 1991 (age 35)
- Place of birth: Enfield, England
- Height: 1.60 m (5 ft 3 in)
- Position: Midfielder

Youth career
- 2003–2010: Watford

Senior career*
Years	Team	Apps	(Gls)
2010–2013	Watford	5	(0)
2012	→ Brentford (loan)	0	(0)
2012	→ Hayes & Yeading United (loan)	8	(2)
2012–2013	→ Accrington Stanley (loan)	7	(1)
2013	→ Boreham Wood (loan)	9	(0)
2013–2016	Accrington Stanley	119	(12)
2016–2018	Cambridge United	62	(5)
2018–2019	Accrington Stanley	4	(0)
2019	→ Morecambe (loan)	16	(0)
2019–2021	Boreham Wood	30	(1)
Total		260	(21)
- * Club domestic league appearances and goals as of 18:41, 4 May 2022 (UTC)

Piero Mingoia (born 20 October 1991) is an English former professional footballer who played as an attacking midfielder.

He began his career with Watford, and spent time on loan at Brentford, Hayes & Yeading United, Accrington Stanley and Boreham Wood before joining Accrington Stanley in 2013. He subsequently joined Cambridge United, before returning to Accrington, where he was loaned to Morecambe. He last played for National League side Boreham Wood.

== Career ==
=== Watford ===
Mingoia was born in Enfield, London He joined Watford at the age of 13 and rose through the ranks. He signed professional terms towards the end of the 2009–10 season, penning a one-year deal following the conclusion of his two-year scholarship. He marked his full debut on 8 January 2011 against Hartlepool United in the FA Cup with a fine goal, curling in from 25 yards. Watford went on to win the game 4–1.

He made his league debut for Watford in the 3–0 home win against Derby County a week later, as an 81st-minute substitute for Marvin Sordell. Mingoia made four more appearances during the 2010–11 season and was rewarded with a two-year contract extension.

Mingoia joined Brentford on loan for a month on 5 January 2012. He took no part in any matchday squad for the club, and returned to Watford a week before his loan spell was due to end. Mingoia joined Hayes & Yeading United on loan on 22 March for one month.

Mingoia joined League Two side Accrington Stanley on an initial month's loan in September 2012. This was extended for a further three months in October, keeping Mingoia at Stanley until January 2013. On 31 January 2013, he joined Boreham Wood on loan until the end of the season, stating that he "wanted to go back to basics and enjoy playing football again".

Watford released Mingoia when his contract expired at the end of the 2012–13 season.

=== Accrington Stanley ===
Mingoia returned to Accrington Stanley to sign a one-year contract on 1 August 2013. On 22 January 2014, Mingoia signed a new contract extension to keep him contracted until the summer of 2015. In June 2015, he signed a further one-year deal with the club.

=== Cambridge United ===
Mingoia signed a two-year deal with Cambridge United on 2 June 2016. He scored on his debut in a 1–1 draw with Barnet on 6 August 2016.

He left the club at the end of the 2017–18 season.

=== Second spell at Accrington ===
On 27 June 2018, Mingoia returned to Accrington Stanley on a two-year deal.

==== Morecambe (loan) ====
On 31 January 2019, Mingoia joined Morecambe on loan until the end of the season.

=== Boreham Wood ===
On 1 July 2019, Mingoia joined Boreham Wood on a free transfer. He was released by the club in June 2021.

== Career statistics ==
Appearances and goals by club, season and competition
Club	Season	League			FA Cup		League Cup		Other		Total	
Club	Season	Division	Apps	Goals	Apps	Goals	Apps	Goals	Apps	Goals	Apps	Goals
Watford	2010–11	Championship	5	0	2	1	0	0	—		7	1
Watford	2011–12	Championship	0	0	0	0	0	0	—		0	0
Watford	2012–13	Championship	0	0	0	0	0	0	0	0	0	0
Watford	Total		5	0	2	1	0	0	0	0	7	1
Brentford (loan)	2011–12	League One	0	0	0	0	0	0	0	0	0	0
Hayes & Yeading United (loan)	2011–12	Conference Premier	8	2	—		—		—		8	2
Accrington Stanley (loan)	2012–13	League Two	7	1	2	0	—		—		9	1
Boreham Wood (loan)	2012–13	Conference South	9	0	—		—		—		9	0
Accrington Stanley	2013–14	League Two	37	1	1	0	2	1	1 (Note: Appearances in Football League Trophy)	0	41	2
Accrington Stanley	2014–15	League Two	36	8	3	0	1	0	1	0	41	8
Accrington Stanley	2015–16	League Two	46	3	2	0	1	0	3 (Note: One appearance in Football League Trophy, two appearances one goal in League Two play-offs)	1	52	4
Accrington Stanley	Total		119	12	6	0	4	1	5	1	134	14
Cambridge United	2016–17	League Two	40	5	4	1	2	1	3	0	49	7
Cambridge United	2017–18	League Two	22	0	1	0	0	0	2	1	25	1
Cambridge United	Total		62	5	5	1	2	1	5	1	74	8
Accrington Stanley	2018–19	League One	4	0	2	0	1	0	5	0	12	0
Morecambe (loan)	2018–19	League Two	16	0	0	0	0	0	0	0	16	0
Boreham Wood	2019–20	National League	22	1	0	0	—		0	0	22	1
Boreham Wood	2020–21	National League	8	0	3	0	—		1 (Note: Appearances in FA Trophy)	0	12	0
Boreham Wood	Total		30	1	3	0	—		1	0	34	1
Career totals			260	21	20	2	7	2	16	2	303	27

== Honours ==
Individual

- Accrington Stanley Player of the Year: 2014–15
