= Josh Coulson =

English footballer (born 1989)

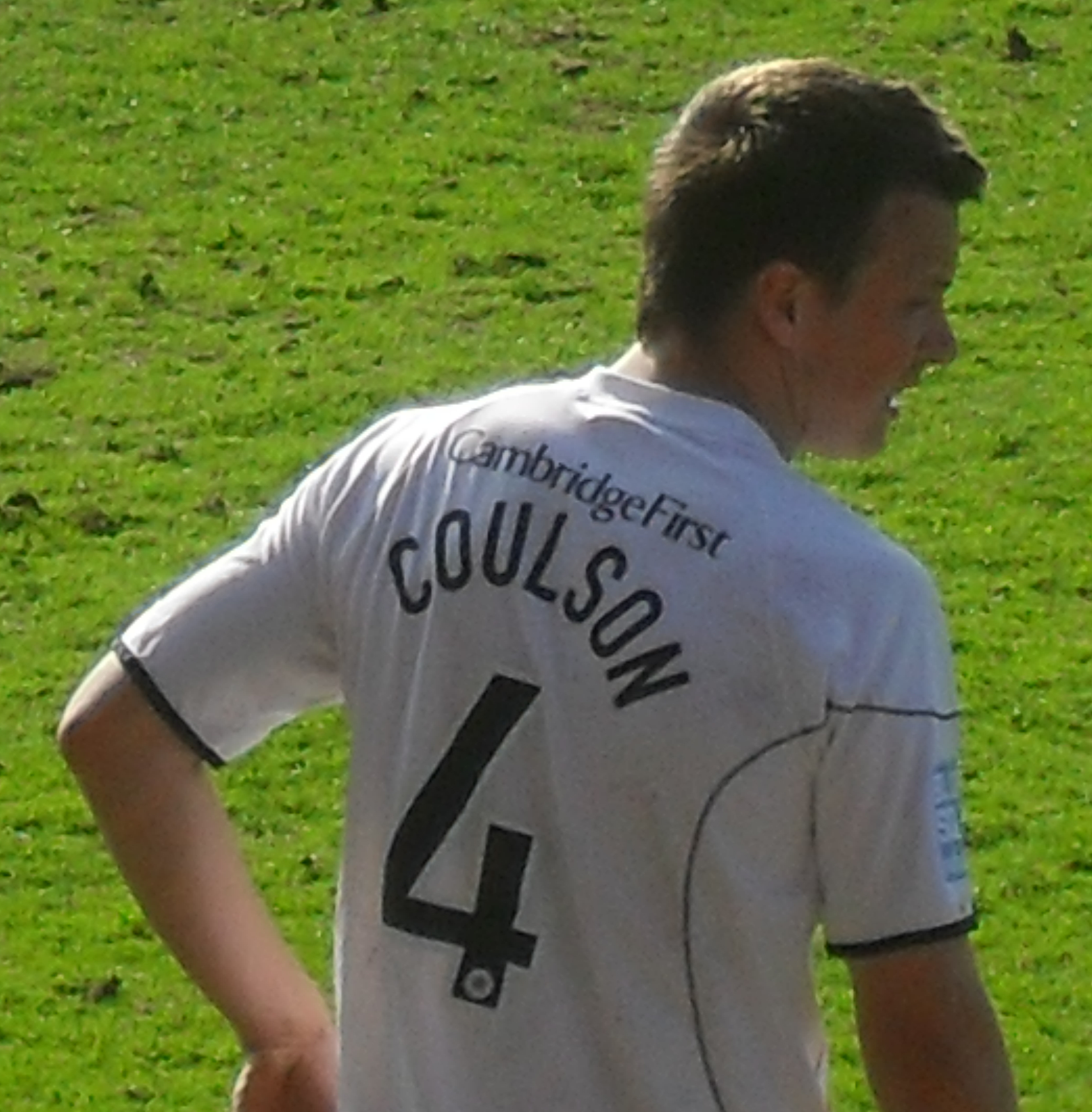
- Coulson playing for Cambridge United in 2011

Personal information
- Full name: Joshua David Coulson
- Date of birth: 28 January 1989 (age 37)
- Place of birth: Cambridge, England
- Height: 6 ft 3 in (1.91 m)
- Position: Centre-back

Team information
- Current team: Newmarket Town

Senior career*
Years	Team	Apps	(Gls)
2007–2018	Cambridge United	273	(14)
2017–2018	→ Leyton Orient (loan)	15	(1)
2018–2021	Leyton Orient	102	(8)
2021–2022	Southend United	8	(0)
2022	→ King's Lynn Town (loan)	21	(1)
2022–2025	King's Lynn Town	118	(11)
2025–	Newmarket Town	28	(3)
- * Club domestic league appearances and goals as of 10:50, 9 June 2025 (UTC)

Joshua David Coulson (born 28 January 1989) is an English professional footballer who plays as a centre-back for Isthmian League North Division club Newmarket Town.

== Career ==
=== Cambridge United ===
Born in Cambridge, Cambridgeshire, Coulson played for local side Cherry Hinton Lions before joining Cambridge City and playing in the Youth Development squad for the 2005–06 season. He then went with Jez George (a former director of Cambridge City) to Cambridge United's youth squad. He made his first team debut for Cambridge United on 6 October 2007, as a substitute in a 2–2 home draw with Halifax Town.

Coulson scored his first senior goal on 16 March 2010, netting his side's first of a 3–1 home success against Salisbury. He featured regularly for the side in the following campaigns, becoming a popular figure amongst supporters, and signed a new two-and-a-half-year deal on 12 February 2014.

Coulson won the FA Trophy and the Conference Premier play-offs in the 2013–14 season with Cambridge United.

On 9 August 2014 Coulson played his first match in the Football League, starting and scoring the game's only goal against Plymouth Argyle.

=== Leyton Orient ===
On 28 July 2017 Coulson signed for Leyton Orient initially on a six-month loan spell. On 8 January, Coulson joined permanently after 10 years at Cambridge.

=== Southend United ===
On 9 June 2021, Coulson signed for Southend United.

=== Kings Lynn Town ===
On 5 February 2022, Coulson joined National League side King's Lynn Town on a one-month loan deal. Coulson joined the club on a permanent basis in May 2022 having spent the second half of the season on loan.

=== Newmarket Town ===
On 8 June 2025, Coulson agreed to join Isthmian League North Division side Newmarket Town.

== Career statistics ==
As of end of 2024–25 season

Appearances and goals by club, season and competition
Club	Season	League			FA Cup		League Cup		Other		Total	
Club	Season	Division	Apps	Goals	Apps	Goals	Apps	Goals	Apps	Goals	Apps	Goals
Cambridge United	2007–08	Conference Premier	13	0	1	0	—		3 (Note: Two appearances in FA Trophy, one in Conference League Cup)	0	17	0
Cambridge United	2008–09	Conference Premier	12	0	0	0	—		2 (Note: One appearance in Conference League Cup, one in Conference Premier play-offs)	0	14	0
Cambridge United	2009–10	Conference Premier	23	2	0	0	—		3 (Note: Appearances in FA Trophy)	0	26	2
Cambridge United	2010–11	Conference Premier	38	4	3	0	—		3	0	44	4
Cambridge United	2011–12	Conference Premier	32	0	3	2	—		2	0	37	2
Cambridge United	2012–13	Conference Premier	39	4	1	0	—		2	0	42	4
Cambridge United	2013–14	Conference Premier	39	2	4	0	—		10 (Note: Seven appearances in FA Trophy, three in Conference Premier play-offs)	0	53	2
Cambridge United	2014–15	League Two	46	1	6	0	1	0	1 (Note: Appearance in Football League Trophy)	0	54	1
Cambridge United	2015–16	League Two	23	1	0	0	1	0	1	0	25	1
Cambridge United	2016–17	League Two	7	0	1	0	2	0	2	0	12	0
Cambridge United	Total		272	14	19	2	4	0	29	0	324	16
Leyton Orient (loan)	2017–18	National League	15	1	0	0	—		1	1	16	2
Leyton Orient	2017–18	National League	12	0	0	0	—		3	1	15	1
Leyton Orient	2018–19	National League	42	7	1	0	—		4	1	47	8
Leyton Orient	2019–20	League Two	28	1	1	0	1	0	1	0	31	1
Leyton Orient	2020–21	League Two	20	0	1	0	2	0	1	0	24	0
Leyton Orient	Total		117	9	3	0	3	0	10	3	133	12
Southend United	2021–22	National League	8	0	0	0	—		1	0	9	0
King's Lynn Town (loan)	2021–22	National League	21	1	0	0	—		0	0	21	1
King's Lynn Town	2022–23	National League North	45	7	6	1	—		2 (Note: One appearance in FA Trophy, one appearance in National League North play-offs)	0	53	8
King's Lynn Town	2023–24	National League North	45	4	2	0	—		1	1	48	5
King's Lynn Town	2024–25	National League North	28	0	3	0	—		2	0	33	0
King's Lynn Town	Total		139	12	11	1	0	0	5	1	155	14
Career total			536	35	33	3	7	0	45	4	622	42

== Honours ==
=== Club ===
Cambridge United

- FA Trophy: 2013–14
- Conference Premier play-offs: 2014

Leyton Orient

- National League: 2018–19
- FA Trophy runner-up: 2018–19
