= 2019–20 Leyton Orient F.C. season =

Leyton Orient F.C.
2019–20 season
- Chairman: Nigel Travis
- Head Coach: Carl Fletcher (Between 16 October – 14 November); Ross Embleton (from 7 January)
- Stadium: Brisbane Road
- League Two: 17th
- FA Cup: First round
- EFL Cup: First round
- EFL Trophy: Second round
- Top goalscorer: League: Josh Wright (8); All: Josh Wright (8)
- Highest home attendance: 7,042 (vs. Swindon Town, 07 Sep 2019)
- Lowest home attendance: 1,562 (vs. Southend United, 03 Sep 2019)
- Average home league attendance: 5,608
Home colours	Away colours	Third colours

The 2019–20 season is the 121st season in the history of Leyton Orient Football Club, their 102nd in the Football League, and the first back in League Two for three years following promotion last season.

== Transfers ==
=== Transfers in ===
Date	Position	Nationality	Name	From	Fee	Ref.
1 July 2019	CF	(England)	Lee Angol	(England) Shrewsbury Town	Undisclosed	
1 July 2019	CF	(Republic of Ireland)	Conor Wilkinson	(England) Dagenham & Redbridge	Undisclosed	
1 July 2019	CM	(England)	Josh Wright	(England) Bradford City	Free transfer	
1 August 2019	CF	(England)	Louis Dennis	(England) Portsmouth	Undisclosed	
2 January 2020	GK	(Chile)	Lawrence Vigouroux	(Chile) Everton	Free transfer	
27 January 2020	CF	(England)	Danny Johnson	(Scotland) Dundee	Undisclosed	

=== Loans in ===
Date from	Position	Nationality	Name	From	Date until	Ref.
19 August 2019	DM	(England)	George Marsh	(England) Tottenham Hotspur	30 June 2020	
17 January 2020	DM	(Mali)	Ousseynou Cissé	(England) Gillingham	30 June 2020	
31 January 2020	CF	(England)	Kazaiah Sterling	(England) Tottenham Hotspur	30 June 2020	

=== Loans out ===
Date from	Position	Nationality	Name	To	Date until	Ref.
1 November 2019	CF	(Cyprus)	Ruel Sotiriou	(England) Dover Athletic	28 November 2019	
9 January 2020	CM	(Northern Ireland)	Dale Gorman	(Wales) Newport County	30 June 2020	
16 January 2020	CF	(England)	James Alabi	(England) Eastleigh	30 June 2020	
17 January 2020	CB	(Republic of Ireland)	Shadrach Ogie	(England) Dover Athletic	30 June 2020	

=== Transfers out ===
Date	Position	Nationality	Name	To	Fee	Ref.
1 July 2019	CF	(Zimbabwe)	Macauley Bonne	(England) Charlton Athletic	£200,000	
1 July 2019	CF	(England)	Charles Clayden	(England) Charlton Athletic	Undisclosed	
1 July 2019	GK	(England)	Charlie Grainger	(England) Dulwich Hamlet	Released	
1 July 2019	CF	(England)	Josh Koroma	(England) Huddersfield Town	Undisclosed	
1 July 2019	CM	(Wales)	Alex Lawless	(England) Ebbsfleet United	Released	
1 July 2019	CM	(England)	Charlie Lee	(England) Yeovil Town	Released	
1 July 2019	CF	(England)	Jay Simpson	(Cyprus) Nea Salamina	Released	
24 January 2020	GK	(England)	Dean Brill	Retired		

== Pre-season ==
The O's announced pre-season friendlies against Harlow Town, Hull City, Hornchurch, AFC Rushden & Diamonds, Dartford, Bishop's Stortford and Norwich City XI.

6 July 2019 Friendly	Harlow Town	0–5	Leyton Orient	Harlow
15:00 BST		Report	Harrold 22'; Wilkinson 24'; Brophy 67'; Angol 70'; Alabi 80'	Stadium: The Harlow Avenue; Referee: Lloyd Wood

9 July 2019 Friendly	Leyton Orient	2–2	Hull City	Marbella, Spain
19:30 CEST	Burke 23'; Lewis-Potter 58'	Report	Gorman 29'; Coulson 68'	Stadium: Marbella Football Center

17 July 2019 Friendly	Hornchurch	0–1	Leyton Orient	Upminster
19:45 BST			Angol 65'	Stadium: Hornchurch Stadium

18 July 2019 Friendly	AFC Rushden & Diamonds	0–1	Leyton Orient	Rushden
19:45 BST			Gorman 14'	Stadium: Hayden Road

20 July 2019 Friendly	Dartford	0–2	Leyton Orient	Dartford
15:00 BST		Report	Ekpiteta 4'; Ling 87'	Stadium: Princes Park; Attendance: 821; Referee: Gary Maskell

23 July 2019 Friendly	Bishop's Stortford	3–3	Leyton Orient	Bishop's Stortford
19:45 BST	Callander 46'; Cureton 61'; Greene 72'	Report	Angol 18', 29'; Maguire-Drew 25'	Stadium: Woodside Park; Attendance: 816

27 July 2019 Friendly	Leyton Orient	2–1	Norwich City U23	Leyton
15:00 BST	Angol 63'; Wright 85'	Report	Jaiyesimi 23'	Stadium: Brisbane Road

== Competitions ==
=== League Two ===
==== League table ====
Pos	Team	Pld	W	D	L	GF	GA	GD	Pts	PPG
13	Crawley Town	37	11	15	11	51	47	+4	48	1.30
14	Newport County	36	12	10	14	32	39	−7	46	1.28
15	Grimsby Town	37	12	11	14	45	51	−6	47	1.27
16	Cambridge United	37	12	9	16	40	48	−8	45	1.22
17	Leyton Orient	36	10	12	14	47	55	−8	42	1.17
18	Carlisle United	37	10	12	15	39	56	−17	42	1.14
19	Oldham Athletic	37	9	14	14	44	57	−13	41	1.11
20	Scunthorpe United	37	10	10	17	44	56	−12	40	1.08
21	Mansfield Town	36	9	11	16	48	55	−7	38	1.06

Source: EFL Official Website
Rules for classification: 1) Points per game; 2) Goal difference; 3) Number of goals scored; 4) Head-to-head results; 5) Wins; 6) Away goals; 7) Penalty points (sec 9.5); 8) 12-point sending off offences

==== Results summary ====
Overall								Home						Away					
Pld	W	D	L	GF	GA	GD	Pts	W	D	L	GF	GA	GD	W	D	L	GF	GA	GD
36	10	12	14	47	55	−8	42	5	8	6	26	30	−4	5	4	8	21	25	−4

Last updated: 7 March 2020.
Source: BBC

==== Results by matchday ====
Matchday	1	2	3	4	5	6	7	8	9	10	11	12	13	14	15	16	17	18	19	20	21	22	23	24	25	26	27	28	29	30	31	32	33	34	35	36
Ground	H	A	H	A	H	A	H	A	H	A	H	A	H	A	A	H	A	H	H	A	H	A	H	A	A	H	A	H	H	A	A	H	H	A	H	H
Result	W	L	D	W	L	D	L	D	L	L	D	W	W	W	L	D	L	L	L	D	D	W	L	D	L	D	L	D	W	L	W	D	W	L	D	W
Position	8	13	16	9	13	15	17	18	19	21	21	20	17	12	17	16	16	17	18	19	19	15	18	18	19	19	20	19	17	20	18	19	17	17	18	17

Updated to match(es) played on 7 March 2020. Source: Statto.com
A = Away; H = Home; W = Win; D = Draw; L = Loss

==== Matches ====
On Thursday, 20 June 2019, the EFL League Two fixtures were revealed.

3 August 2019 1	Leyton Orient	1–0	Cheltenham Town	Leyton
15:00 BST	Wright 68'	Report	Varney (yellow card) 7' (yellow-red card) 70'; Ince (red card) 72'	Stadium: The Breyer Group Stadium; Attendance: 6,534; Referee: Michael Salisbury

10 August 2019 2	Macclesfield Town	3–0	Leyton Orient	Macclesfield
15:00 BST	Archibald 30'; Welch-Hayes (yellow card) 52'; Osadebe 68'; Vassell 83'	Report	Angol (yellow card) 49'	Stadium: Moss Rose; Attendance: 2,167; Referee: Andy Haines

17 August 2019 3	Leyton Orient	0–0	Stevenage	Leyton
15:00 BST	Clay (yellow card) 45+2'	Report		Stadium: Brisbane Road; Attendance: 5,104; Referee: Lee Swabey

20 August 2019 4	Mansfield Town	2–3	Leyton Orient	Mansfield
19:45 BST	Rose 12' (pen.), 29' (pen.); White (yellow card) 84'	Report	Wilkinson 64'; Angol 78'; Gorman (yellow card) 90+5'; Maguire-Drew 90+6'; Dennis (yellow card) 90+7'	Stadium: Field Mill; Attendance: 4,128; Referee: Seb Stockbridge

24 August 2019 5	Leyton Orient	2–3	Crawley Town	Leyton
15:00 BST	Wright 22' (yellow card) 90+4'; Maguire-Drew (yellow card) 24'; Angol 53' (pen.); Gorman (yellow card) 84'	Report	Ferguson 30'; Camará (yellow card) 45+1'; Sesay (yellow card) 52'; Palmer 69', 71'; Lubala (yellow card) 80'	Stadium: Brisbane Road; Attendance: 4,905; Referee: Brett Huxtable

31 August 2019 6	Salford City	1–1	Leyton Orient	Salford
15:00 BST	Towell 13'; Rooney (yellow card) 62'; Piergianni (yellow card) 77'; Dieseruvwe (yellow card) 90+3'	Report	Neal 87' (o.g.)	Stadium: The Peninsula Stadium; Attendance: 3,154; Referee: Marc Edwards

7 September 2019 7	Leyton Orient	1–3	Swindon Town	Leyton
15:00 BST	Angol (yellow card) 38'; Maguire-Drew 74'; Gorman (yellow card) 77'; Ling (yellow card) 90+3'	Report	Anderson 23' (yellow card) 87'; Widdowson 43' (o.g.); Yates 45+2'	Stadium: The Breyer Group Stadium; Attendance: 7,042; Referee: Kevin Johnson

14 September 2019 8	Exeter City	2–2	Leyton Orient	Exeter
15:00 BST	Sweeney 41'; Law 90+2' (pen.)	Report	Ling (yellow card) 24'; Wright (yellow card) 25'; Angol 44'; Dennis 51'; Maguire-Drew (yellow card) 54'; Coulson (yellow card) 65'; Marsh (yellow card) 77'; Clay (yellow card) 90+4'	Stadium: St James Park; Attendance: 4,933; Referee: Peter Wright

17 September 2019 9	Leyton Orient	1–2	Crewe Alexandra	Leyton
19:45 BST	Maguire-Drew 42' (penalty missed) 57'; Dennis (yellow card) 66'; Marsh (yellow card) 90+3'	Report	Nolan 32'; Jones 90'	Stadium: The Breyer Group Stadium; Attendance: 4,289; Referee: Joshua Smith

21 September 2019 10	Colchester United	2–1	Leyton Orient	Colchester
15:00 BST	Poku 3'; Jackson 28'; Lapslie (yellow card) 74'	Report	Wilkinson 44' (yellow card) 69'; Marsh (yellow card) 90+6'	Stadium: JobServe Community Stadium; Attendance: 5,519; Referee: Tom Nield

29 September 2019 11	Leyton Orient	3–3	Port Vale	Leyton
15:00 BST	Wright 4', 90+3'; Wilkinson 59' (yellow card) 64'; Dennis (yellow card) 66'; Marsh (yellow card) 84'	Report	Burgess 21'; Legge 28' (yellow card) 65'; Taylor 85'; Gibbons (yellow card) 64'	Stadium: The Breyer Group Stadium; Attendance: 5,490; Referee: Scott Oldham

5 October 2019 12	Northampton Town	0–1	Leyton Orient	Northampton
15:00 BST	McCormack (yellow card) 73'	Report	Brophy 57'; Gorman (yellow card) 20'; Widdowson (yellow card) 40'; Wilkinson (yellow card) 79'	Stadium: Sixfields Stadium; Attendance: 5,419; Referee: Tony Harrington

12 October 2019 13	Leyton Orient	3–1	Walsall	Leyton
15:00 BST	Harrold (yellow card) 33' (goal) 60'; Widdowson 48'; Happe (yellow card) 59'; Wilkinson 75' (red card) 80'	Report	Jules (yellow card) 15'; Sinclair 21'; Scarr (yellow card) 80'	Stadium: The Breyer Group Stadium; Attendance: 6,951; Referee: Ben Toner

19 October 2019 14	Grimsby Town	0–4	Leyton Orient	Cleethorpes
15:00 BST	Hendrie (yellow card) 25'; Hewitt (yellow card) 56'	Report	Happe 11'; Coulson 21'; Alabi 80'; Wright 85' (pen.); Harrold (yellow card) 28'; Ekpiteta (yellow card) 37'; Dayton (yellow card) 37'	Stadium: Blundell Park; Attendance: 4,132; Referee: Nick Kinseley

22 October 2019 15	Plymouth Argyle	4–0	Leyton Orient	Plymouth
19:45 BST	Grant 14'; Rudden 17'; McFadzean 34'; Widdowson 45+2' (o.g.); Cooper (yellow card) 55'; Wootton (yellow card) 66'	Report		Stadium: Home Park; Attendance: 8,810; Referee: Craig Hicks

26 October 2019 16	Leyton Orient	1–1	Carlisle United	Leyton
15:00 BST	Wright 7' (pen.)	Report	Sagaf (yellow card) 24'; Iredale 48'; Thomas (yellow card) 70'; Webster (yellow card) 80'	Stadium: The Breyer Group Stadium; Attendance: 5,765; Referee: David Rock

2 November 2019 17	Morecambe	1–0	Leyton Orient	Morecambe
15:00 GMT	Tutte (yellow card) 60'; Leitch-Smith 74'; Wildig (yellow card) 79'; Alessandra (yellow card) 90'	Report	Happe (yellow card) 61'	Stadium: Globe Arena; Attendance: 2,691; Referee: Paul Marsden

16 November 2019 18	Leyton Orient	0–2	Scunthorpe United	Leyton
15:00 GMT	Ling (yellow card) 81'	Report	Gilliead 4' (yellow card) 29'; Perch (yellow card) 45+2'; Novak 79'	Stadium: The Breyer Group Stadium; Attendance: 6,670; Referee: Brett Huxtable

23 November 2019 19	Leyton Orient	2–4	Forest Green Rovers	Leyton
15:00 GMT	Clay (yellow card) 40'; Brophy (yellow card) 40'; Turley (yellow card) 49'; Harrold 55'; Maguire-Drew 78'	Report	Adams 15', 33' (yellow card) 54'; Stevens 43'; Mondal 88'	Stadium: The Breyer Group Stadium; Attendance: 4,614; Referee: Christopher Sarginson

7 December 2019 20	Oldham Athletic	1–1	Leyton Orient	Oldham
15:00 GMT	Smith 2'; McCann (yellow card) 44'; Wheater (yellow card) 85'; Maouche (yellow card) 90+1'	Report	Maguire-Drew 25'; Widdowson (yellow card) 46'; Happe (yellow card) 75'; Marsh (yellow card) 87'	Stadium: Boundary Park; Attendance: 3,121; Referee: Alan Young

14 December 2019 21	Leyton Orient	0–0	Bradford City	Leyton
15:00 GMT	Wright (yellow card) 87'	Report	O'Connor (yellow card) 20'	Stadium: The Breyer Group Stadium; Attendance: 6,015; Referee: Christopher Pollard

21 December 2019 22	Cambridge United	2–3	Leyton Orient	Cambridge
15:00 GMT	Hannant (yellow card) 40'; Lambe (yellow card) 41' (yellow-red card) 84'; Roles 69'; Taylor (yellow card) 76'; Smith 82' (pen.)	Report	Marsh (yellow card) 15'; Turley 29' (yellow card) 81'; Wright (penalty missed) 36' 36'; Clay (yellow card) 38'; Angol (yellow card) 45'; Maguire-Drew 45+2'; Judd (yellow card) 65' (yellow-red card) 85'; Brophy (yellow card) 67'	Stadium: Abbey Stadium; Attendance: 5,408; Referee: Trevor Kettle

26 December 2019 23	Leyton Orient	1–3	Colchester United	Leyton
13:00 GMT	Clay (yellow card) 28'; Wright (yellow card) 39'; Maguire-Drew (yellow card) 62'; Sotiriou 86'	Report	Harriott (yellow card) 21'; Robinson 41', 90+1'; Pell 64'; Sowunmi (yellow card) 67'	Stadium: The Breyer Group Stadium; Attendance: 5,648; Referee: Nick Kinseley

29 December 2019 24	Newport County	1–1	Leyton Orient	Newport
15:00 GMT	Amond 81'; McNamara (yellow card) 83'	Report	Sotiriou 2' (yellow card) 83'; Happe (yellow card) 23'; Ekpiteta (yellow card) 38'; Maguire-Drew (yellow card) 61'; Clay (yellow card) 77'	Stadium: Rodney Parade; Attendance: 4,447; Referee: Lee Swabey

1 January 2020 25	Walsall	1–0	Leyton Orient	Bescot
15:00 GMT	Gordon 43' (yellow card) 62'; Pring (yellow card) 56' (yellow-red card) 66'; Kinsella (yellow card) 73'; Roberts (yellow card) 90+1'	Report	Judd (yellow card) 23'	Stadium: Banks's Stadium; Attendance: 4,263; Referee: Darren Handley

11 January 2020 26	Leyton Orient	1–1	Grimsby Town	Leyton
15:00 GMT	Kyprianou (yellow card) 51'; Angol (yellow card) 60' (goal) 90+2' (pen.); Brophy (yellow card) 90+6'	Report	Hessenthaler (yellow card) 30'; Clarke 74'; Hendrie (yellow card) 83'; McKeown (yellow card) 87'	Stadium: The Breyer Group Stadium; Attendance: 6,248; Referee: Will Finnie

18 January 2020 27	Port Vale	1–0	Leyton Orient	Burslem
15:00 GMT	Amoo 71'	Report	Maguire-Drew (yellow card) 37'; Judd (yellow card) 58'; Angol (yellow card) 69'; Coulson (yellow card) 90+2'	Stadium: Vale Park; Attendance: 5,047; Referee: Michael Salisbury

21 January 2020 28	Leyton Orient	1–1	Northampton Town	Leyton
19:45 GMT	Cissé (yellow card) 45+3'; Wright 85' (pen.); Dayton (red card) 89'	Report	Goode (yellow card) 35'; Watson 43'; Anderson (yellow card) 59'; Cornell (yellow card) 76'; Wharton (red card) 88'; Martin (yellow card) 90+5'	Stadium: The Breyer Group Stadium; Attendance: 3,774

25 January 2020 29	Leyton Orient	2–1	Newport County	Leyton
15:00 GMT	Haynes 81' (o.g.); Sotiriou (yellow card) 87' (goal) 89'	Report	Green (yellow card) 76'; Matt 90+5'; Demetriou (yellow card) 90+8'	Stadium: The Breyer Group Stadium; Attendance: 5,084; Referee: David Rock

28 January 2020 30	Crewe Alexandra	2–0	Leyton Orient	Crewe
19:45 GMT	Kirk 2'; Pickering (yellow card) 81'; Powell 88'	Report	Marsh (yellow card) 59'	Stadium: Alexandra Stadium; Attendance: 3,249; Referee: Leigh Doughty

1 February 2020 31	Stevenage	0–3	Leyton Orient	Stevenage
15:00 GMT	Parrett (yellow card) 58'; Cassidy (yellow card) 67'	Report	Sotiriou 19', 62'; Clay (yellow card) 33'; Brophy (yellow card) 47'; Cissé 59'; Wilkinson (yellow card) 90+5'	Stadium: Lamex Stadium; Referee: Graham Salisbury

8 February 2020 32	Leyton Orient	1–1	Macclesfield Town	Leyton
15:00 GMT	Clay (yellow card) 13'; Brophy 75'	Report	Blyth 90+1'	Stadium: Breyer Group Stadium; Attendance: 5,708; Referee: Nick Kinseley

11 February 2020 33	Leyton Orient	2–1	Mansfield Town	Leyton
19:45 GMT	Dayton 45'; Marsh (yellow card) 67'; Benning 74' (o.g.); Brophy (yellow card) 82'	Report	Watts 60'; Sweeney (yellow card) 64'	Stadium: Breyer Group Stadium; Attendance: 3,587; Referee: Josh Smith

15 February 2020 34	Cheltenham Town	2–1	Leyton Orient	Cheltenham
15:00 GMT	May 18'; Broom (yellow card) 32'; Reid (yellow card) 80' (goal) 88'	Report	Wilkinson 17' (yellow card) 67'	Stadium: Jonny-Rocks Stadium; Attendance: 3,527; Referee: Jeremy Simpson

22 February 2020 35	Leyton Orient	2–2	Oldham Athletic	Leyton
15:00 GMT	Hamer 13' (o.g.); Happe (yellow card) 31'; Johnson 54'	Report	Mills (yellow card) 8'; Dearnley 15', 18'; Hamer (yellow card) 45+4'; McCann (yellow card) 58'	Stadium: Breyer Group Stadium; Attendance: 5,334; Referee: James Oldham

29 February 2020	Forest Green Rovers	v	Leyton Orient	Nailsworth
15:00 GMT		Report		Stadium: The New Lawn
Note: Match was postponed due to a waterlogged pitch.

7 March 2020 36	Leyton Orient	2–1	Cambridge United	Leyton
15:00 GMT	Maguire-Drew 17'; Johnson (yellow card) 45' (goal) 45+4'; Marsh (yellow card) 60'	Report	Darling (yellow card) 55'; Mullin 63'; Maris (yellow card) 80'	Stadium: Breyer Group Stadium; Attendance: 5,813; Referee: Paul Marsden

14 March 2020	Bradford City	v	Leyton Orient	Bradford
15:00 GMT				Stadium: The Utilita Energy Stadium
Note: Season was suspended until 3 April 2020, due to the COVID-19 pandemic.

17 March 2020	Leyton Orient	v	Plymouth Argyle	Leyton
19:45 GMT				Stadium: The Breyer Group Stadium
Note: Season was suspended until 3 April 2020, due to the COVID-19 pandemic.

21 March 2020	Carlisle United	v	Leyton Orient	Carlisle
15:00 GMT				Stadium: Brunton Park
Note: Season was suspended until 3 April 2020, due to the COVID-19 pandemic.

28 March 2020	Leyton Orient	v	Morecambe	Leyton
15:00 GMT				Stadium: The Breyer Group Stadium
Note: Season was suspended until 3 April 2020, due to the COVID-19 pandemic.

4 April 2020	Scunthorpe United	v	Leyton Orient	Scunthorpe
15:00 BST				Stadium: Glanford Park
Note: On 3 April, the English Football League decided to postpone all football until safe to do so due to the COVID-19 pandemic.

10 April 2020	Crawley Town	v	Leyton Orient	Crawley
15:00 BST				Stadium: The People's Pension Stadium
Note: On 3 April, the English Football League decided to postpone all football until safe to do so due to the COVID-19 pandemic.

13 April 2020	Leyton Orient	v	Salford City	Leyton
13:00 BST				Stadium: The Breyer Group Stadium
Note: On 3 April, the English Football League decided to postpone all football until safe to do so due to the COVID-19 pandemic.

18 April 2020	Swindon Town	v	Leyton Orient	Swindon
15:00 BST				Stadium: County Ground
Note: On 3 April, the English Football League decided to postpone all football until safe to do so due to the COVID-19 pandemic.

25 April 2020	Leyton Orient	v	Exeter City	Leyton
15:00 BST				Stadium: The Breyer Group Stadium
Note: On 3 April, the English Football League decided to postpone all football until safe to do so due to the COVID-19 pandemic.

=== FA Cup ===
The first round draw was made on 21 October 2019.

10 November 2019 First round	Leyton Orient	1–2	Maldon & Tiptree	Leyton
12:45 BST	Harrold (yellow card) 15'; Maguire-Drew (yellow card) 28'; Dayton 67'	Report	Dombaxe (yellow card) 18'; Parish 43' (yellow card) 67' (yellow-red card) 84'; Awotwi (yellow card) 62'; Slew 65' (yellow card) 67'	Stadium: The Breyer Group Stadium; Attendance: 3,425; Referee: Charles Breakspear

=== EFL Cup ===
The first round draw was made on 20 June.

13 August 2019 First round	Plymouth Argyle	2–0	Leyton Orient	Plymouth
19:45 BST	McFadzean 59'; Telford 62'; Grant (yellow card) 84'	Report		Stadium: Home Park; Attendance: 5,573; Referee: Antony Coggins

=== EFL Trophy ===
On 9 July 2019, the pre-determined group stage draw was announced with Invited clubs to be drawn on 12 July 2019. The draw for the second round was made on 16 November 2019 live on Sky Sports.

Pos	Div	Team	Pld	W	PW	PL	L	GF	GA	GD	Pts	Qualification
1	ACA	Brighton & Hove Albion U21	3	2	0	1	0	5	1	+4	7	Advance to Round 2
2	L2	Leyton Orient	3	1	1	0	1	3	4	−1	5	Advance to Round 2
3	L1	AFC Wimbledon	3	1	0	0	2	4	5	−1	3	
4	L1	Southend United	3	1	0	0	2	3	5	−2	3	

Source: EFL.com

3 September 2019 Group stage	Leyton Orient	2–0	Southend United	Leyton
19:45 BST	Happe 6'; Gorman (yellow card) 45' (goal) 90'; Angol (yellow card) 90+2'	Report	Hutchinson (red card) 45+1'; Cox (yellow card) 70'	Stadium: The Breyer Group Stadium; Attendance: 1,562; Referee: Chris Pollard

8 October 2019 Group stage	AFC Wimbledon	3–0	Leyton Orient	Norbiton
19:30 BST	Pigott 3' (pen.); Folivi 49'; Reilly (yellow card) 75' (goal) 79'	Report	Ogie (yellow card) 36'; Gorman (penalty missed) 72' (yellow card) 84'	Stadium: The Cherry Red Records Stadium; Attendance: 642; Referee: Charles Breakspear

6 November 2019 Group stage	Leyton Orient	1–1 (4–2 p)	Brighton & Hove Albion U21	Leyton
19:45 GMT	Clay (yellow card) 54'; Dennis 63'; Happe (yellow card) 65'	Report	Cashman 33'; Roberts (yellow card) 49'; Cochrane (yellow card) 90'	Stadium: The Breyer Group Stadium; Attendance: 709; Referee: Kevin Johnson
	Penalties
	Maguire-Drew (penalty scored); Clay (penalty scored); Dennis (penalty missed); Alabi (penalty scored); Dayton (penalty scored)		Cochrane (penalty missed); Davies (penalty scored); Jenks (penalty missed); Button (penalty scored)

4 December 2019 Second round	Bristol Rovers	1–1 (4–2 p)	Leyton Orient	Horfield
19:45 GMT	Kilgour 16'; Holmes-Dennis (yellow card) 43'	Report	Wilkinson (yellow card) 13'; Angol 20'; Harrold (yellow card) 85'	Stadium: Memorial Stadium; Attendance: 865; Referee: Joshua Smith
	Penalties
	Clarke-Harris (penalty scored); Rodman (penalty scored); Craig (penalty scored); Sercombe (penalty scored)		Wright (penalty missed); Harrold (penalty scored); Marsh (penalty scored); Sotiriou (penalty missed)

== Player statistics ==
No.	Pos	Nat	Player	Total		League Two		FA Cup		EFL Cup		EFL Trophy	
No.	Pos	Nat	Player	Apps	Goals	Apps	Goals	Apps	Goals	Apps	Goals	Apps	Goals
Goalkeepers
12	GK	(England) ENG	Sam Sargeant	17	0	11+1	0	1	0	0	0	4	0
22	GK	(Chile) CHI	Lawrence Vigouroux	6	0	6	0	0	0	0	0	0	0
24	GK	(England) ENG	Arthur Janata	0	0	0	0	0	0	0	0	0	0
Defenders
2	DF	(England) ENG	Sam Ling	18	0	15	0	1	0	0	0	1+1	0
3	DF	(England) ENG	Joe Widdowson	19	1	14+2	1	1	0	1	0	1	0
5	DF	(England) ENG	Marvin Ekpiteta	32	0	26+1	0	0	0	1	0	4	0
6	DF	(England) ENG	Josh Coulson	31	1	26+2	1	1	0	1	0	0+1	0
14	DF	(England) ENG	Myles Judd	13	0	6+3	0	0	0	1	0	3	0
15	DF	(England) ENG	Dan Happe	37	2	32	1	1	0	1	0	2+1	1
23	DF	(England) ENG	Jamie Turley	10	1	8	1	0	0	0	0	2	0
29	DF	(England) ENG	Jayden Sweeney	1	0	0	0	0	0	0	0	0+1	0
Midfielders
7	MF	(Jamaica) JAM	Jobi McAnuff	1	0	0+1	0	0	0	0	0	0	0
8	MF	(England) ENG	Craig Clay	39	0	30+5	0	1	0	1	0	1+1	0
10	MF	(England) ENG	Jordan Maguire-Drew	38	7	21+12	7	1	0	0	0	4	0
11	MF	(England) ENG	James Dayton	15	2	8+3	1	0+1	1	0	0	1+2	0
16	MF	(England) ENG	James Brophy	38	2	29+5	2	1	0	0+1	0	1+1	0
21	MF	(England) ENG	George Marsh (on loan from Tottenham Hotspur)	29	0	23+3	0	0	0	0	0	3	0
26	MF	(Cyprus) CYP	Hector Kyprianou	8	0	3+3	0	0	0	0	0	2	0
28	MF	(England) ENG	Brendon Shabani	0	0	0	0	0	0	0	0	0	0
31	MF	(Mali) MLI	Ousseynou Cissé (on loan from Gillingham)	10	1	9+1	1	0	0	0	0	0	0
44	MF	(England) ENG	Josh Wright	38	8	33+2	8	1	0	1	0	1	0
Forwards
9	FW	(Republic of Ireland) IRL	Conor Wilkinson	28	5	23+3	5	0	0	0+1	0	1	0
17	FW	(England) ENG	Louis Dennis	21	2	7+9	1	1	0	1	0	3	1
18	FW	(England) ENG	Matt Harrold	27	2	9+15	2	1	0	0	0	1+1	0
19	FW	(England) ENG	Lee Angol	29	5	20+6	4	0	0	1	0	1+1	1
20	FW	(Cyprus) CYP	Ruel Sotiriou	11	5	7+3	5	0	0	0	0	0+1	0
39	FW	(England) ENG	Danny Johnson	6	2	4+2	2	0	0	0	0	0	0
Out on Loan
4	MF	(Northern Ireland) NIR	Dale Gorman	17	1	7+6	0	0+1	0	1	0	2	1
25	DF	(Republic of Ireland) IRL	Shadrach Ogie	3	0	0	0	0	0	0	0	3	0
27	FW	(England) ENG	James Alabi	14	1	0+10	1	0+1	0	0	0	3	0
Retired During the Season
1	GK	(England) ENG	Dean Brill	20	0	19	0	0	0	1	0	0	0

Last updated: 7 March 2020
Source: Competitions

=== Top scorers ===
Includes all competitive matches. The list is sorted by squad number when total goals are equal.

Last updated 7 March 2020.

Rank	No.	Nationality	Player	League Two	FA Cup	EFL Cup	EFL Trophy	Total
1
1	44	(England)	Josh Wright	8	0	0	0	8
2
2	10	(England)	Jordan Maguire-Drew	7	0	0	0	7
3
3	9	(Republic of Ireland)	Conor Wilkinson	5	0	0	0	5
3	19	(England)	Lee Angol	4	0	0	1	5
3	20	(Cyprus)	Ruel Sotiriou	5	0	0	0	5
6
6	11	(England)	James Dayton	1	1	0	0	2
6	15	(England)	Dan Happe	1	0	0	1	2
6	16	(England)	James Brophy	2	0	0	0	2
6	17	(England)	Louis Dennis	1	0	0	1	2
6	18	(England)	Matt Harrold	2	0	0	0	2
6	39	(England)	Danny Johnson	2	0	0	0	2
12
12	3	(England)	Joe Widdowson	1	0	0	0	1
12	4	(Northern Ireland)	Dale Gorman	0	0	0	1	1
12	6	(England)	Josh Coulson	1	0	0	0	1
12	23	(England)	Jamie Turley	1	0	0	0	1
12	27	(England)	James Alabi	1	0	0	0	1
12	31	(Mali)	Ousseynou Cissé	1	0	0	0	1
Own goals				4	0	0	0	4
TOTALS				47	1	0	4	52
