= Myles Judd =

English footballer (born 1999)

Personal information
- Full name: Myles Mark Judd
- Date of birth: 24 May 1999 (age 27)
- Place of birth: Chigwell, England
- Height: 1.78 m (5 ft 10 in)
- Position: Right-back

Youth career
- Leyton Orient

Senior career*
Years	Team	Apps	(Gls)
2015–2021	Leyton Orient	85	(0)
2016	→ Hastings United (loan)	1	(0)
2020–2021	→ Barnet (loan)	9	(0)
2022–2023	Dover Athletic	74	(1)
2023–2024	Hemel Hempstead Town	28	(2)
2024	Welling United	0	(0)
2024–2025	Ramsgate	14	(0)
2025	Herne Bay	5	(0)
- * Club domestic league appearances and goals as of 16:52, 29 December 2025 (UTC)

Myles Mark Judd (born 24 February 1999) is an English footballer who plays as a right-back.

== Playing career ==
=== Leyton Orient ===
Judd made his debut for Leyton Orient at the age of 16 years and 189 days, coming on for Lloyd James 83 minutes into the 2–1 Football League Trophy defeat to Luton Town at Kenilworth Road on 1 September 2015.

Judd made his league debut for Orient in the 1–0 home defeat to Exeter City on 22 November 2016.

He joined Barnet on loan on 30 December 2020. He was sent off on his debut against Boreham Wood after a deliberate handball on the goal line. After making nine league appearances on loan for Barnet, Judd returned to parent club Leyton Orient on 18 March 2021. Judd was released by Leyton Orient at the end of the 2020–21 season.

=== Dover Athletic ===
On 12 January 2022, Judd joined the National League's bottom side Dover Athletic on a non-contract basis. Judd was released following relegation, being offered the chance to return to the club over pre-season to prove his fitness. On 12 July 2022, Judd re-signed for the club on a permanent contract. Although he was not initially announced to have been one of four players retained by the club, he returned to the club in June 2023.

=== Hemel Hempstead Town ===
Despite having agreed to return to Dover Athletic, Judd signed for National League South rivals Hemel Hempstead Town on 8 July 2023.

=== Welling United ===
On 17 June 2024, Judd joined fellow National League South side Welling United. Just one month later however, he departed the club.

=== Ramsgate ===
On 31 August 2024, Judd was announced to have joined Isthmian League South East Division club Ramsgate.

=== Herne Bay ===
On 1 March 2025, Judd joined fellow Isthmian League South East Division club Herne Bay.

=== Criminal charges ===
On 1 May 2026, he was charged with conspiracy to commit robbery. He denied the charges.

== Statistics ==
As of end of 2024–25 season

Appearances and goals by club, season and competition
Club	Season	League			FA Cup		League Cup		Other		Total	
Club	Season	Division	Apps	Goals	Apps	Goals	Apps	Goals	Apps	Goals	Apps	Goals
Leyton Orient	2015–16	League Two	0	0	0	0	0	0	1 (Note: Appearances in the EFL Trophy)	0	1	0
Leyton Orient	2016–17	League Two	20	0	0	0	0	0	1	0	21	0
Leyton Orient	2017–18	National League	10	0	3	0	—		2 (Note: Appearances in the FA Trophy)	0	15	0
Leyton Orient	2018–19	National League	19	0	0	0	—		3	0	22	0
Leyton Orient	2019–20	League Two	9	0	0	0	1	0	3	0	13	0
Leyton Orient	2020–21	League Two	0	0	0	0	0	0	1	0	1	0
Leyton Orient	Total		58	0	3	0	1	0	11	0	73	0
Hastings United (loan)	2016–17	Isthmian League Division One South	1	0	0	0	—		0	0	1	0
Barnet (loan)	2020–21	National League	9	0	0	0	—		0	0	9	0
Dover Athletic	2021–22	National League	15	0	0	0	—		0	0	15	0
Dover Athletic	2022–23	National League South	39	1	1	0	—		1	0	41	1
Dover Athletic	Total		54	1	1	0	0	0	1	0	56	1
Hemel Hempstead Town	2023–24	National League South	21	2	3	0	—		0	0	24	2
Ramsgate	2024–25	Isthmian League South East Division	14	0	3	0	—		4 (Note: Three appearances in FA Trophy, one appearance in Alan Turvey Trophy)	0	21	0
Herne Bay	2024–25	Isthmian League South East Division	5	0	—		—		0	0	5	0
Career total			162	3	10	0	1	0	16	0	189	3

== Honours ==
=== Club ===
Leyton Orient

- National League: 2018–19

== Legal issues ==
On 1 May 2026, Judd was charged with armed robbery after a man in his 20s had his phone and money stolen after he was threatened with weapons on 2 April.
