= David Gregory (footballer, born 1994) =

English footballer

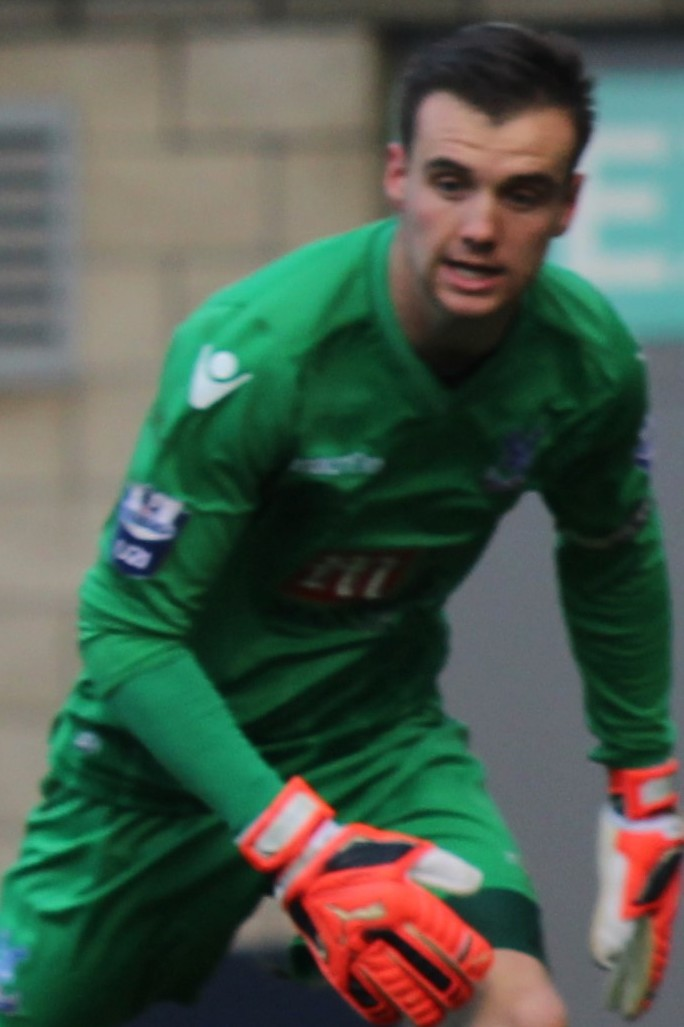
- Gregory in November 2015

Personal information
- Full name: David Michael Gregory
- Date of birth: 1 October 1994 (age 32)
- Place of birth: Croydon, England
- Height: 1.90 m (6 ft 3 in)
- Position: Goalkeeper

Youth career
- 2011–2013: Crystal Palace

Senior career*
Years	Team	Apps	(Gls)
2013–2016	Crystal Palace	0	(0)
2013	→ Harrow Borough (loan)	6	(0)
2014	→ Sutton United (loan)	2	(0)
2014	→ Bishop's Stortford (loan)	16	(0)
2016	→ Eastbourne Borough (loan)	3	(0)
2016	→ Leyton Orient (loan)	0	(0)
2016–2017	Cambridge United	1	(0)
2017–2019	Bromley	91	(0)
2019–2020	Boreham Wood	14	(0)
2020	→ Ebbsfleet United (loan)	7	(0)
- * Club domestic league appearances and goals as of 15:15, 27 February 2020 (UTC)

David Michael Gregory (born 1 October 1994) is an English professional footballer who plays as a goalkeeper.

== Career ==
Gregory signed for Cambridge United from Crystal Palace on 4 June 2016 and made his league debut on 15 October covering for Will Norris who was suffering from tonsillitis, in a 0–1 defeat against Grimsby Town.

Following his release from Cambridge at the end of the season, Gregory joined his local side Bromley. He left the club at the end of the 2018/19 season.

== Honours ==
Bromley

- FA Trophy runner-up: 2017–18
