= 2018–19 FA Trophy =

Football Association Trophy

Tournament details
- Country: England; Guernsey; Wales

Final positions
- Champions: AFC Fylde (1st title)
- Runners-up: Leyton Orient

The 2018–19 FA Trophy (known for sponsorship reasons as the Buildbase FA Trophy) is the 50th season of the FA Trophy, an annual football competition for teams at levels 5–8 of the English National League System.

== Calendar ==
The calendar for the 2018–19 Buildbase FA Trophy, as announced by The Football Association.

| Round | Main Date | Number of Fixtures | Clubs Remaining | New Entries This Round | Prize Money |
| Extra preliminary round | 29 September 2018 | 27 | 295 → 268 | 54 | £ 2,000 |
| Preliminary round | 13 October 2018 | 56 | 268 → 212 | 85 | £ 3,000 |
| First round qualifying | 27 October 2018 | 72 | 212 → 140 | 88 | £ 3,250 |
| Second round qualifying | 10 November 2018 | 36 | 140 → 104 | 0 | £ 4,000 |
| Third round qualifying | 24 November 2018 | 40 | 104 → 64 | 44 | £ 5,000 |
| First round proper | 15 December 2018 | 32 | 64 → 32 | 24 | £ 6,000 |
| Second round proper | 12 January 2019 | 16 | 32 → 16 | 0 | £ 7,000 |
| Third round proper | 2 February 2019 | 8 | 16 → 8 | 0 | £ 8,000 |
| Fourth round proper | 23 February 2019 | 4 | 8 → 4 | 0 | £ 10,000 |
| Semi-finals | 16 and 23 March 2019 | 2 | 4 → 2 | 0 | £ 20,000 |
| Final | 19 May 2019 | 1 | 2 → 1 | 0 | Runners-up £ 30,000; Winners £ 60,000 |

One team at Level 8 did not enter (Guernsey). This was the first year to have an extra preliminary round, due to the increase from 72 to 88 teams in the Level 7 leagues.

== Extra preliminary round ==
| Tie | Home team (tier) | Score | Away team (tier) | Att. |
Friday 28 September 2018
| 11 | Witham Town (8) | 1–0 | Coggeshall Town (8) | 188 |
Saturday 29 September 2018
| 1 | Atherton Collieries (8) | 4–2 | Runcorn Linnets (8) | 226 |
| 2 | Cleethorpes Town (8) | 3–1 | Mossley (8) | 179 |
| 3 | Sheffield (8) | 2–2 | Prescot Cables (8) | 270 |
| 4 | Trafford (8) | 2–1 | Colne (8) | 317 |
| 5 | Glossop North End (8) | 0–2 | Brighouse Town (8) | 201 |
| 6 | Droylsden (8) | 2–1 | Widnes (8) | 114 |
| 7 | Bromsgrove Sporting (8) | 1–3 | Corby Town (8) | 954 |
| 8 | Loughborough Dynamo (8) | 5–2 | Market Drayton Town (8) | 91 |
| 9 | Peterborough Sports (8) | 2–1 | Sutton Coldfield Town (8) | 133 |
| 10 | Coleshill Town (8) | 1–2 | Kidsgrove Athletic (8) | 120 |
| 12 | Uxbridge (8) | 1–1 | Chalfont St. Peter (8) | 84 |
| 13 | Felixstowe & Walton United (8) | 1–3 | Grays Athletic (8) | 250 |
| 15 | Bedford Town (8) | 1–1 | Cheshunt (8) | 222 |
| 16 | Bury Town (8) | 1–2 | Horsham (8) | 270 |
| 17 | Aveley (8) | 3–1 | Tooting & Mitcham United (8) | 106 |
| 18 | Didcot Town (8) | 3–1 | Thamesmead Town (8) | 136 |

| Tie | Home team (tier) | Score | Away team (tier) | Att. |
| 19 | Ashford Town (8) | 4–2 | Heybridge Swifts (8) | 105 |
| 20 | Barton Rovers (8) | 1–3 | Kempston Rovers (8) | 102 |
| 21 | Whyteleafe (8) | 4–1 | Bowers & Pitsea (8) | 86 |
| 22 | Waltham Abbey (8) | 1–3 | Hastings United (8) | 191 |
| 23 | AFC Sudbury (8) | 0–1 | Egham Town (8) | 226 |
| 24 | Ashford United (8) | 4–4 | Haywards Heath Town (8) | 175 |
| 25 | Blackfield & Langley (8) | 3–0 | Highworth Town (8) | 63 |
| 27 | Slimbridge (8) | 2–2 | Winchester City (8) | 85 |
Sunday 30 September 2018
| 14 | Romford (8) | 2–3 | Great Wakering Rovers (8) | 115 |
| 26 | Evesham United (8) | 1–5 | Moneyfields (8) | 149 |
Replays
Tuesday 2 October 2018
| 3R | Prescot Cables (8) | 6–2 | Sheffield (8) | 221 |
| 12R | Chalfont St. Peter (8) | 0–0 (5–4 p) | Uxbridge (8) | 71 |
| 15R | Cheshunt (8) | 1–2 | Bedford Town (8) | 102 |
| 24R | Haywards Heath Town (8) | 3–0 | Ashford United (8) | 78 |
| 27R | Winchester City (8) | 3–3 (5–6 p) | Slimbridge (8) | 93 |

== Preliminary round ==
| Tie | Home team (tier) | Score | Away team (tier) | Att. |
Friday 12 October 2018
| 23 | AFC Dunstable (8) | 0–1 | Witham Town (8) | 156 |
| 46 | Aveley (8) | 2–1 | Basildon United (8) | 188 |
Saturday 13 October 2018
| 1 | Prescot Cables (8) | 5–1 | Kendal Town (8) | 408 |
| 3 | Marske United (8) | 3–3 | Atherton Collieries (8) | 292 |
| 4 | Radcliffe (8) | 2–3 | Cleethorpes Town (8) | 248 |
| 5 | Droylsden (8) | 1–1 | Tadcaster Albion (8) | 167 |
| 6 | Trafford (8) | 1–2 | Ramsbottom United (8) | 272 |
| 7 | Skelmersdale United (8) | 1–3 | Frickley Athletic (8) | 139 |
Match played at Frickley Athletic.
| 8 | Ossett United (8) | 6–0 | Colwyn Bay (8) | 630 |
| 9 | Morpeth Town (8) | 3–4 | Brighouse Town (8) | 198 |
| 10 | Clitheroe (8) | 3–2 | Pontefract Collieries (8) | 230 |
| 11 | Spalding United (8) | 1–4 | Carlton Town (8) | 128 |
| 12 | Wisbech Town (8) | 1–2 | Kidsgrove Athletic (8) | 187 |
Match awarded to Wisbech Town as Kidsgrove Athletic fielded an ineligible player.
| 13 | Peterborough Sports (8) | 2–4 | Cambridge City (8) | 211 |
| 14 | Gresley (8) | 1–2 | Newcastle Town (8) | 282 |
| 15 | Belper Town (8) | 0–0 | Stamford (8) | 278 |
| 16 | Chasetown (8) | 2–1 | Lincoln United (8) | 223 |
| 17 | Soham Town Rangers (8) | 0–0 | AFC Mansfield (8) | 150 |
| 18 | Leek Town (8) | 0–0 | Loughborough Dynamo (8) | 341 |
| 19 | Corby Town (8) | 2–3 | Yaxley (8) | 445 |
| 20 | Chipstead (8) | 2–1 | Welwyn Garden City (8) | 125 |
| 21 | Berkhamsted (8) | 5–1 | South Park (8) | 149 |
| 22 | Barking (8) | 0–1 | Hayes & Yeading United (8) | 103 |
| 24 | Hythe Town (8) | 2–0 | FC Romania (8) | 175 |
| 25 | Grays Athletic (8) | 2–4 | Sevenoaks Town (8) | 206 |
| 27 | Didcot Town (8) | 2–1 | Hertford Town (8) | 151 |
| 28 | Greenwich Borough (8) | 4–1 | Egham Town (8) | 72 |
| 29 | Dunstable Town (8) | 2–0 | Northwood (8) | 152 |
| 30 | Haywards Heath Town (8) | 2–3 | Bracknell Town (8) | 121 |
| 31 | Faversham Town (8) | 0–2 | Sittingbourne (8) | 310 |
| 32 | Phoenix Sports (8) | 1–1 | Ramsgate (8) | 108 |
| 33 | Bedfont Sports (8) | 1–4 | Whitstable Town (8) | 61 |
| 34 | Canvey Island (8) | 2–0 | Cray Wanderers (8) | 207 |

| Tie | Home team (tier) | Score | Away team (tier) | Att. |
| 35 | Tilbury (8) | 1–4 | Bedford Town (8) | 120 |
| 36 | Horsham (8) | 3–1 | Ware (8) | 103 |
| 37 | Great Wakering Rovers (8) | 0–1 | East Grinstead Town (8) | 96 |
| 38 | Dereham Town (8) | 1–3 | Kempston Rovers (8) | 203 |
| 39 | VCD Athletic (8) | 3–1 | Hanwell Town (8) | 76 |
| 40 | Aylesbury (8) | 1–2 | Herne Bay (8) | 158 |
| 41 | Three Bridges (8) | 0–1 | Molesey (8) | 79 |
| 42 | Hastings United (8) | 2–4 | Whyteleafe (8) | 460 |
| 43 | Ashford Town (8) | 0–0 | Westfield (8) | 102 |
| 44 | Chalfont St. Peter (8) | 0–2 | Maldon & Tiptree (8) | 98 |
| 45 | Brentwood Town (8) | 4–1 | Marlow (8) | 161 |
| 47 | Slimbridge (8) | 2–3 | Melksham Town (8) | 81 |
| 48 | AFC Totton (8) | 1–1 | North Leigh (8) | 254 |
| 49 | Yate Town (8) | 1–0 | Blackfield & Langley (8) | 174 |
| 50 | Cinderford Town (8) | 5–0 | Moneyfields (8) | 104 |
| 51 | Bideford (8) | 2–3 | Street (8) | 188 |
| 52 | Thatcham Town (8) | 2–0 | Cirencester Town (8) | 232 |
| 53 | Mangotsfield United (8) | 3–0 | Kidlington (8) | 114 |
| 54 | Larkhall Athletic (8) | 0–0 | Thame United (8) | 85 |
| 55 | Fleet Town (8) | 2–1 | Barnstaple Town (8) | 104 |
| 56 | Bristol Manor Farm (8) | 1–0 | Paulton Rovers (8) | 188 |
Sunday 14 October 2018
| 2 | Pickering Town (8) | 3–0 | Stocksbridge Park Steels (8) | 138 |
| 26 | Aylesbury United (8) | 2–3 | Mildenhall Town (8) | 142 |
Replays
Monday 15 October 2018
| 3R | Atherton Collieries (8) | 0–1 | Marske United (8) | 215 |
Tuesday 16 October 2018
| 5R | Tadcaster Albion (8) | 0–2 | Droylsden (8) | 220 |
| 15R | Stamford (8) | 1–0 | Belper Town (8) | 187 |
| 17R | AFC Mansfield (8) | 2–1 | Soham Town Rangers (8) | 103 |
| 18R | Loughborough Dynamo (8) | 2–5 | Leek Town (8) | 100 |
| 32R | Ramsgate (8) | 1–0 | Phoenix Sports (8) | 180 |
| 43R | Westfield (8) | 2–3 | Ashford Town (8) | 93 |
| 48R | North Leigh (8) | 1–5 | AFC Totton (8) | 156 |
| 54R | Thame United (8) | 1–0 | Larkhall Athletic (8) | 59 |

== First round qualifying ==
| Tie | Home team (tier) | Score | Away team (tier) | Att. |
Saturday 27 October 2018
| 1 | Workington (7) | 1–0 | Scarborough Athletic (7) | 363 |
| 2 | Marine (7) | 0–2 | Lancaster City (7) | 286 |
| 3 | Warrington Town (7) | 0–1 | Prescot Cables (8) | 316 |
| 4 | Pickering Town (8) | 2–2 | Droylsden (8) | 162 |
| 5 | Frickley Athletic (8) | 0–3 | Ramsbottom United (8) | 127 |
| 6 | Whitby Town (7) | 0–1 | Witton Albion (7) | 181 |
| 7 | Farsley Celtic (7) | 4–1 | Brighouse Town (8) | 173 |
| 8 | Ossett United (8) | 2–1 | Clitheroe (8) | 320 |
| 9 | South Shields (7) | 4–0 | North Ferriby United (7) | 714 |
| 10 | Hyde United (7) | 3–0 | Bamber Bridge (7) | 315 |
| 11 | Cleethorpes Town (8) | 0–2 | Marske United (8) | 142 |
| 12 | Stalybridge Celtic (7) | 1–0 | Nantwich Town (7) | 247 |
| 13 | Gainsborough Trinity (7) | 0–0 | Tamworth (7) | 313 |
| 14 | Buxton (7) | 3–3 | King’s Lynn Town (7) | 285 |
| 15 | Kettering Town (7) | 2–0 | Stourbridge (7) | 409 |
| 16 | AFC Rushden & Diamonds (7) | 2–1 | St. Ives Town (7) | 386 |
| 17 | Stamford (8) | 0–0 | Leek Town (8) | 176 |
| 18 | Cambridge City (8) | 1–2 | Basford United (7) | 164 |
| 19 | Carlton Town (8) | 1–0 | Bedworth United (7) | 73 |
| 20 | Newcastle Town (8) | 5–2 | Chasetown (8) | 172 |
| 21 | Mickleover Sports (7) | 1–0 | Redditch United (7) | 157 |
| 22 | St. Neots Town (7) | 1–0 | Matlock Town (7) | 249 |
| 24 | Stafford Rangers (7) | 2–1 | Rushall Olympic (7) | 371 |
| 25 | AFC Mansfield (8) | 1–1 | Hednesford Town (7) | 106 |
| 26 | Grantham Town (7) | 0–4 | Halesowen Town (7) | 159 |
| 27 | Alvechurch (7) | 1–1 | Stratford Town (7) | 199 |
| 28 | Barwell (7) | 1–1 | Coalville Town (7) | 172 |
| 29 | Chipstead (8) | 2–1 | Berkhamsted (8) | 64 |
| 30 | Sittingbourne (8) | 1–2 | Wingate & Finchley (7) | 155 |
| 31 | Brentwood Town (8) | 3–1 | Whitstable Town (8) | 147 |
| 32 | Hythe Town (8) | 1–2 | Bishop’s Stortford (7) | 242 |
| 33 | Molesey (8) | 0–1 | Walton Casuals (7) | 154 |
| 34 | Kingstonian (7) | 1–1 | Bedford Town (8) | 257 |
| 35 | Margate (7) | 1–2 | Potters Bar Town (7) | 154 |
| 36 | Horsham (8) | 3–0 | Corinthian-Casuals (7) | 137 |
| 37 | Burgess Hill Town (7) | 1–1 | Worthing (7) | 459 |
| 38 | Dorking Wanderers (7) | 2–1 | Sevenoaks Town (8) | 259 |
| 39 | Biggleswade Town (7) | 2–1 | Harrow Borough (7) | 152 |
| 40 | Hitchin Town (7) | 0–1 | Hayes & Yeading United (8) | 317 |
| 41 | Maldon & Tiptree (8) | 0–3 | Royston Town (7) | 88 |
| 42 | Haringey Borough (7) | 1–1 | Chesham United (7) | 203 |
| 43 | Ashford Town (8) | 1–2 | Lewes (7) | 101 |
| 44 | Lowestoft Town (7) | 0–1 | Enfield Town (7) | 289 |
| 45 | AFC Hornchurch (7) | 6–0 | Ramsgate (8) | 162 |
| 46 | Kempston Rovers (8) | 1–1 | Beaconsfield Town (7) | 102 |
| 47 | Folkestone Invicta (7) | 5–1 | Leatherhead (7) | 281 |
| 48 | Merstham (7) | 2–0 | East Grinstead Town (8) | 121 |
| 49 | Tonbridge Angels (7) | 2–1 | Whyteleafe (8) | 380 |
| 50 | Hendon (7) | 2–1 | Staines Town (7) | 169 |

| Tie | Home team (tier) | Score | Away team (tier) | Att. |
| 51 | VCD Athletic (8) | 1–3 | Leiston (7) | 98 |
| 52 | Mildenhall Town (8) | 2–4 | Greenwich Borough (8) | 147 |
| 53 | Metropolitan Police (7) | 2–2 | Carshalton Athletic (7) | 129 |
| 54 | Canvey Island (8) | 0–1 | Brightlingsea Regent (7) | 183 |
| 55 | Bracknell Town (8) | 2–2 | Bognor Regis Town (7) | 339 |
| 56 | Whitehawk (7) | 2–3 | Harlow Town (7) | 161 |
| 57 | Aveley (8) | 1–0 | Dunstable Town (8) | 121 |
| 58 | Kings Langley (7) | 0–2 | Needham Market (7) | 122 |
| 59 | Herne Bay (8) | 2–1 | Witham Town (8) | 210 |
| 60 | Yate Town (8) | 1–1 | Dorchester Town (7) | 175 |
| 61 | Gosport Borough (7) | 1–2 | AFC Totton (8) | 191 |
| 62 | Cinderford Town (8) | 2–2 | Street (8) | 104 |
| 63 | Thame United (8) | 4–2 | Bristol Manor Farm (8) | 83 |
| 64 | Farnborough (7) | 2–3 | Merthyr Town (7) | 203 |
| 65 | Fleet Town (8) | 0–3 | Salisbury (7) | 267 |
| 66 | Taunton Town (7) | 1–3 | Weymouth (7) | 513 |
| 67 | Thatcham Town (8) | 1–2 | Melksham Town (8) | 286 |
| 68 | Poole Town (7) | 2–1 | Frome Town (7) | 271 |
| 69 | Hartley Wintney (7) | 1–1 | Tiverton Town (7) | 162 |
| 70 | Didcot Town (8) | 1–1 | Mangotsfield United (8) | 121 |
| 71 | Basingstoke Town (7) | 4–2 | Wimborne Town (7) | 272 |
| 72 | Swindon Supermarine (7) | 1–1 | Banbury United (7) | 215 |
Tuesday 6 November 2018
| 23 | Wisbech Town (8) | 1–1 | Yaxley (8) | 198 |
Replays
Monday 29 October 2018
| 53R | Carshalton Athletic (7) | 2–1 | Metropolitan Police (7) | 128 |
Tuesday 30 October 2018
| 4R | Droylsden (8) | 2–3 | Pickering Town (8) | 109 |
| 13R | Tamworth (7) | 3–0 | Gainsborough Trinity (7) | 276 |
| 17R | Leek Town (8) | 0–1 | Stamford (8) | 215 |
| 25R | Hednesford Town (7) | 0–1 | AFC Mansfield (8) | 174 |
| 27R | Stratford Town (7) | 3–0 | Alvechurch (7) | 172 |
| 28R | Coalville Town (7) | 2–3 (a.e.t.) | Barwell (7) | 172 |
| 34R | Bedford Town (8) | 3–2 | Kingstonian (7) | 218 |
| 37R | Worthing (7) | 2–1 | Burgess Hill Town (7) | 408 |
| 42R | Chesham United (7) | 2–2 (3–1 p) | Haringey Borough (7) | 163 |
| 46R | Beaconsfield Town (7) | 3–1 | Kempston Rovers (8) | 59 |
| 55R | Bognor Regis Town (7) | 2–2 (3–2 p) | Bracknell Town (8) | 306 |
| 60R | Dorchester Town (7) | 2–0 | Yate Town (8) | 207 |
| 62R | Street (8) | 4–1 | Cinderford Town (8) | 101 |
| 69R | Tiverton Town (7) | 5–1 | Hartley Wintney (7) | 148 |
| 70R | Mangotsfield United (8) | 2–4 (a.e.t.) | Didcot Town (8) | 86 |
| 72R | Banbury United (7) | 3–0 | Swindon Supermarine (7) | 218 |
Wednesday 31 October 2018
| 14R | King’s Lynn Town (7) | 1–2 (a.e.t.) | Buxton (7) | 277 |
Saturday 10 November 2018
| 23R | Yaxley (8) | 2–0 | Wisbech Town (8) | 186 |

== Second round qualifying ==
| Tie | Home team (tier) | Score | Away team (tier) | Att. |
Saturday 10 November 2018
| 1 | Basford United (7) | 4–0 | Stafford Rangers (7) | 246 |
| 2 | Stamford (8) | 1–0 | Kettering Town (7) | 576 |
| 3 | Stalybridge Celtic (7) | 0–0 | Buxton (7) | 409 |
| 5 | AFC Mansfield (8) | 2–2 | Pickering Town (8) | 105 |
| 6 | St. Neots Town (7) | 0–1 | Barwell (7) | 216 |
| 7 | Lancaster City (7) | 1–0 | Ossett United (8) | 262 |
| 8 | Newcastle Town (8) | 2–2 | Workington (7) | 160 |
| 9 | Marske United (8) | 2–0 | Tamworth (7) | 290 |
| 10 | Halesowen Town (7) | 3–2 | Prescot Cables (8) | 408 |
| 11 | Stratford Town (7) | 1–1 | Mickleover Sports (7) | 183 |
| 12 | Witton Albion (7) | 2–0 | AFC Rushden & Diamonds (7) | 300 |
| 13 | Farsley Celtic (7) | 0–0 | Carlton Town (8) | 167 |
| 14 | South Shields (7) | 2–1 | Hyde United (7) | 1,095 |
| 15 | Brightlingsea Regent (7) | 2–1 | AFC Hornchurch (7) | 181 |
| 16 | Lewes (7) | 2–0 | Merthyr Town (7) | 475 |
| 17 | Chipstead (8) | 2–2 | Bedford Town (8) | 98 |
| 18 | Dorking Wanderers (7) | 1–0 | Tonbridge Angels (7) | 330 |
| 19 | Hendon (7) | 1–2 | Biggleswade Town (7) | 223 |
| 20 | Basingstoke Town (7) | 2–1 | Enfield Town (7) | 310 |
| 21 | Royston Town (7) | 5–2 | Thame United (8) | 170 |
| 22 | Horsham (8) | 1–0 | Potters Bar Town (7) | 147 |
| 23 | Brentwood Town (8) | 2–2 | Poole Town (7) | 159 |
| 24 | Herne Bay (8) | 0–1 | Needham Market (7) | 206 |
| 25 | Leiston (7) | 2–1 | Melksham Town (8) | 172 |
| 26 | Salisbury (7) | 2–0 | Merstham (7) | 422 |

| Tie | Home team (tier) | Score | Away team (tier) | Att. |
| 27 | Banbury United (7) | 0–2 | Hayes & Yeading United (8) | 387 |
| 28 | Carshalton Athletic (7) | 3–1 | Harlow Town (7) | 358 |
| 29 | Weymouth (7) | 2–2 | Street (8) | 629 |
| 30 | Dorchester Town (7) | 3–1 | AFC Totton (8) | 285 |
| 31 | Aveley (8) | 1–2 | Beaconsfield Town (7) | 147 |
| 32 | Worthing (7) | 1–0 | Chesham United (7) | 802 |
| 33 | Walton Casuals (7) | 2–0 | Bognor Regis Town (7) | 197 |
| 34 | Folkestone Invicta (7) | 3–0 | Didcot Town (8) | 275 |
| 35 | Greenwich Borough (8) | 1–0 | Bishop's Stortford (7) | 104 |
| 36 | Tiverton Town (7) | 2–3 | Wingate & Finchley (7) | 162 |
Tuesday 13 November 2018
| 4 | Yaxley (8) | 2–2 | Ramsbottom United (8) | 85 |
Replays
Tuesday 13 November 2018
| 3R | Buxton (7) | 1–2 | Stalybridge Celtic (7) | 283 |
| 5R | Pickering Town (8) | 2–0 | AFC Mansfield (8) | 188 |
| 8R | Workington (7) | 5–0 | Newcastle Town (8) | 219 |
| 11R | Mickleover Sports (7) | 0–1 | Stratford Town (7) | 157 |
| 17R | Bedford Town (8) | 2–0 | Chipstead (8) | 182 |
| 23R | Poole Town (7) | 4–1 | Brentwood Town (8) | 276 |
| 29R | Street (8) | 0–1 | Weymouth (7) | 376 |
Wednesday 14 November 2018
| 13R | Carlton Town (8) | 0–4 | Farsley Celtic (7) | 115 |
Tuesday 20 November 2018
| 4R | Ramsbottom United (8) | 5–1 | Yaxley (8) | 150 |

== Third round qualifying ==
| Tie | Home team (tier) | Score | Away team (tier) | Att. |
Friday 23 November 2018
| 12 | Darlington (6) | 0–2 | AFC Telford United (6) | 770 |
Saturday 24 November 2018
| 1 | Altrincham (6) | 4–0 | Bradford Park Avenue (6) | 570 |
| 2 | Blyth Spartans (6) | 4–1 | Marske United (8) | 642 |
| 3 | Alfreton Town (6) | 0–2 | Farsley Celtic (7) | 214 |
| 4 | Spennymoor Town (6) | 8–2 | Halesowen Town (7) | 502 |
| 5 | Stamford (8) | 1–1 | Barwell (7) | 262 |
| 6 | Hereford (6) | 3–1 | FC United of Manchester (6) | 1,067 |
| 7 | Brackley Town (6) | 3–0 | Nuneaton Borough (6) | 350 |
| 8 | Stratford Town (7) | 2–1 | South Shields (7) | 378 |
| 9 | Kidderminster Harriers (6) | 1–3 | York City (6) | 784 |
| 10 | Southport (6) | 0–0 | Chester (6) | 914 |
| 11 | Leamington (6) | 2–1 | Witton Albion (7) | 332 |
| 13 | Ashton United (6) | 0–5 | Boston United (6) | 187 |
| 14 | Pickering Town (8) | 0–0 | Ramsbottom United (8) | 222 |
| 15 | Basford United (7) | 2–1 | Curzon Ashton (6) | 266 |
| 16 | Lancaster City (7) | 2–2 | Guiseley (6) | 259 |
| 17 | Stockport County (6) | 3–0 | Chorley (6) | 1,245 |
| 18 | Stalybridge Celtic (7) | 1–2 | Workington (7) | 344 |
| 19 | Lewes (7) | 2–2 | Hemel Hempstead Town (6) | 325 |
| 20 | Bedford Town (8) | 2–1 | Worthing (7) | 306 |
| 21 | Salisbury (7) | 2–1 | East Thurrock United (6) | 465 |
| 22 | Dorchester Town (7) | 1–0 | Hungerford Town (6) | 258 |
| 23 | Slough Town (6) | 2–3 | Weston-super-Mare (6) | 426 |
| 24 | Poole Town (7) | 2–3 | Dorking Wanderers (7) | 285 |
| 25 | Weymouth (7) | 1–1 | St. Albans City (6) | 518 |
| 26 | Concord Rangers (6) | 2–3 | Wealdstone (6) | 281 |
| 27 | Truro City (6) | 3–0 | Greenwich Borough (8) | 39 |
| 28 | Chippenham Town (6) | 1–1 | Wingate & Finchley (7) | 280 |

| Tie | Home team (tier) | Score | Away team (tier) | Att. |
| 29 | Beaconsfield Town (7) | 3–1 | Leiston (7) | 89 |
| 30 | Hampton & Richmond Borough (6) | 0–1 | Billericay Town (6) | 298 |
| 31 | Eastbourne Borough (6) | 1–1 | Dartford (6) | 340 |
| 32 | Welling United (6) | 1–1 | Dulwich Hamlet (6) | 478 |
| 33 | Woking (6) | 2–0 | Folkestone Invicta (7) | 805 |
| 34 | Basingstoke Town (7) | 1–1 (3–5 p) | Torquay United (6) | 472 |
| 35 | Carshalton Athletic (7) | 2–0 | Walton Casuals (7) | 238 |
| 36 | Royston Town (7) | 1–1 | Needham Market (7) | 202 |
| 37 | Hayes & Yeading United (8) | 0–0 | Brightlingsea Regent (7) | 144 |
| 40 | Oxford City (6) | 4–0 | Chelmsford City (6) | 212 |
Sunday 25 November 2018
| 38 | Gloucester City (6) | 1–3 | Biggleswade Town (7) | 236 |
| 39 | Horsham (8) | 1–2 | Bath City (6) | 328 |
Replays
Tuesday 27 November 2018
| 5R | Barwell (7) | 3–3 (7–6 p) | Stamford (8) | 126 |
| 10R | Chester (6) | 0–2 | Southport (6) | 654 |
| 14R | Ramsbottom United (8) | 2–1 | Pickering Town (8) | 117 |
| 16R | Guiseley (6) | P–P | Lancaster City (7) | – |
| 19R | Hemel Hempstead Town (6) | 3–2 | Lewes (7) | 137 |
| 25R | St. Albans City (6) | 0–2 | Weymouth (7) | 174 |
| 28R | Wingate & Finchley (7) | 3–2 | Chippenham Town (6) | 90 |
| 31R | Dartford (6) | 2–3 | Eastbourne Borough (6) | 404 |
| 36R | Needham Market (7) | 2–0 | Royston Town (7) | 153 |
| 37R | Brightlingsea Regent (7) | 1–2 | Hayes & Yeading United (8) | 108 |
Wednesday 28 November 2018
| 32R | Dulwich Hamlet (6) | 2–1 | Welling United (6) | 219 |
Tuesday 11 December 2018
| 16R | Guiseley (6) | 1–2 | Lancaster City (7) | 283 |

== First round proper ==
| Tie | Home team (tier) | Score | Away team (tier) | Att. |
Saturday 15 December 2018
| 1 | Southport (6) | 0–1 | Solihull Moors (5) | 767 |
| 2 | Lancaster City (7) | 0–3 | Blyth Spartans (6) | 149 |
| 3 | AFC Fylde (5) | 5–1 | Stratford Town (7) | 491 |
| 4 | Salford City (5) | P–P | Gateshead (5) | – |
| 5 | Chesterfield (5) | 5–1 | Basford United (7) | 1,276 |
| 6 | Wrexham (5) | 3–0 | Boston United (6) | 1,083 |
| 7 | Barrow (5) | 1–2 | FC Halifax Town (5) | 578 |
| 8 | Harrogate Town (5) | 2–1 | York City (6) | 1,336 |
| 9 | Leamington (6) | 0–1 | Hartlepool United (5) | 344 |
| 10 | Workington (7) | 0–0 | Ramsbottom United (8) | 298 |
| 11 | Spennymoor Town (6) | 4–0 | Barwell (7) | 295 |
| 12 | Altrincham (6) | 0–1 | Stockport County (6) | 988 |
| 13 | AFC Telford United (6) | 4–3 | Farsley Celtic (7) | 452 |
| 14 | Wingate & Finchley (7) | 2–0 | Dulwich Hamlet (6) | 202 |
| 15 | Biggleswade Town (7) | 2–1 | Wealdstone (6) | 258 |
| 16 | Maidenhead United (5) | A–A | Oxford City (6) | 1,000 |
Match abandoned after 76 minutes due to a waterlogged pitch when the score was 0–1.
| 17 | Hereford (6) | 2–1 | Billericay Town (6) | 1,097 |
| 18 | Aldershot Town (5) | 3–3 | Bedford Town (8) | 784 |
| 19 | Carshalton Athletic (7) | 1–0 | Dorking Wanderers (7) | 291 |
| 20 | Hemel Hempstead Town (6) | 2–1 | Eastleigh (5) | 234 |
| 21 | Dover Athletic (5) | 2–2 | Havant & Waterlooville (5) | 327 |
| 22 | Woking (6) | 1–1 | Maidstone United (5) | 1,245 |
| 23 | Ebbsfleet United (5) | 0–1 | Dagenham & Redbridge (5) | 720 |
| 24 | Barnet (5) | 3–2 | Bath City (6) | 413 |

| Tie | Home team (tier) | Score | Away team (tier) | Att. |
| 25 | Bromley (5) | 2–1 | Sutton United (5) | 776 |
Match awarded to Sutton United as Bromley fielded an ineligible player.
| 26 | Truro City (6) | 4–0 | Weston-super-Mare (6) | 255 |
| 27 | Salisbury (7) | P–P | Braintree Town (5) | – |
| 28 | Boreham Wood (5) | 3–1 (a.e.t.) | Torquay United (6) | 207 |
| 29 | Leyton Orient (5) | 4–0 | Beaconsfield Town (7) | 1,177 |
| 30 | Brackley Town (6) | 4–2 | Hayes & Yeading United (8) | 268 |
| 31 | Weymouth (7) | W.O. | Needham Market (7) | – |
Needham Market withdrew due to excessive travel following the first game being postponed shortly before kick-off.
| 32 | Eastbourne Borough (6) | 0–4 | Dorchester Town (7) | 215 |
Tuesday 18 December 2018
| 4 | Salford City (5) | 3–1 | Gateshead (5) | 380 |
| 16 | Maidenhead United (5) | P–P | Oxford City (6) | – |
| 27 | Salisbury (7) | P–P | Braintree Town (5) | – |
Tuesday 8 January 2019
| 16 | Maidenhead United (5) | 1–2 (a.e.t.) | Oxford City (6) | 352 |
| 27 | Salisbury (7) | 2–1 | Braintree Town (5) | 502 |
Replays
Tuesday 18 December 2018
| 10R | Ramsbottom United (8) | 2–0 | Workington (7) | 170 |
| 18R | Bedford Town (8) | 7–0 | Aldershot Town (5) | 485 |
| 21R | Havant & Waterlooville (5) | P–P | Dover Athletic (5) | – |
| 22R | Maidstone United (5) | 3–2 (a.e.t.) | Woking (6) | 602 |
Tuesday 8 January 2019
| 21R | Havant & Waterlooville (5) | 0–1 | Dover Athletic (5) | 229 |

== Second round proper ==
| Tie | Home team (tier) | Score | Away team (tier) | Att. |
Saturday 12 January 2019
| 1 | Ramsbottom United (8) | 2–2 | Weymouth (7) | 457 |
| 2 | Hartlepool United (5) | 1–2 | AFC Telford United (6) | 1,920 |
| 3 | Maidstone United (5) | 1–0 | Oxford City (6) | 1,156 |
| 4 | Hemel Hempstead Town (6) | 4–2 | Wingate & Finchley (7) | 454 |
| 5 | Barnet (5) | 2–1 | Dorchester Town (7) | 878 |
| 6 | Hereford (6) | 1–3 | Brackley Town (6) | 1,569 |
| 7 | Salford City (5) | 2–0 | Dagenham & Redbridge (5) | 1,061 |
| 8 | Blyth Spartans (6) | 1–0 | Boreham Wood (5) | 712 |
| 9 | AFC Fylde (5) | 1–0 | Biggleswade Town (7) | 594 |
| 10 | Spennymoor Town (6) | 3–0 | Sutton United (5) | 760 |

| Tie | Home team (tier) | Score | Away team (tier) | Att. |
| 11 | Stockport County (6) | 5–0 | Truro City (6) | 1,677 |
| 12 | Dover Athletic (5) | 1–2 | Harrogate Town (5) | 463 |
| 13 | Chesterfield (5) | 1–0 | Bedford Town (8) | 2,213 |
| 14 | Carshalton Athletic (7) | 4–1 | Salisbury (7) | 514 |
| 15 | FC Halifax Town (5) | 2–2 | Solihull Moors (5) | 798 |
| 16 | Wrexham (5) | 0–1 | Leyton Orient (5) | 1,949 |
Replays
Tuesday 15 January 2019
| 1R | Weymouth (7) | 1–3 | Ramsbottom United (8) | 657 |
| 15R | Solihull Moors (5) | 1–0 | FC Halifax Town (5) | 355 |

== Third round proper ==
Following their victory over Weymouth, Ramsbottom United are the lowest-ranked team still in the competition, and the only team left from the eighth tier of English football.

| Tie | Home team (tier) | Score | Away team (tier) | Att. |
Saturday 2 February 2019
| 1 | Ramsbottom United (8) | P–P | AFC Fylde (5) | – |
| 2 | Spennymoor Town (6) | P–P | AFC Telford United (6) | – |
| 3 | Carshalton Athletic (7) | 3–3 | Barnet (5) | 938 |
| 4 | Chesterfield (5) | 0–2 | Brackley Town (6) | 2,054 |
| 5 | Leyton Orient (5) | 1–0 | Blyth Spartans (6) | 1,842 |
| 6 | Hemel Hempstead Town (6) | P–P | Solihull Moors (5) | – |
| 7 | Salford City (5) | P–P | Maidstone United (5) | – |
| 8 | Harrogate Town (5) | 2–4 | Stockport County (6) | 1,142 |
Tuesday 5 February 2019
| 1 | Ramsbottom United (8) | 5–5 | AFC Fylde (5) | 743 |

| Tie | Home team (tier) | Score | Away team (tier) | Att. |
| 2 | Spennymoor Town (6) | 1–2 | AFC Telford United (6) | 571 |
| 6 | Hemel Hempstead Town (6) | 0–5 | Solihull Moors (5) | 438 |
| 7 | Salford City (5) | 1–1 | Maidstone United (5) | 706 |
Replays
Tuesday 12 February 2019
| 1R | AFC Fylde (5) | 4–1 | Ramsbottom United (8) | 913 |
| 3R | Barnet (5) | 2–1 | Carshalton Athletic (7) | 606 |
| 7R | Maidstone United (5) | 3–0 | Salford City (5) | 880 |

== Fourth round proper ==
| Tie | Home team (tier) | Score | Away team (tier) | Att. |
Saturday 23 February 2019
| 1 | Brackley Town (6) | 1–2 | Leyton Orient (5) | 1,563 |
| 2 | AFC Fylde (5) | 0–0 (4–1 p) | Barnet (5) | 795 |
| 3 | Stockport County (6) | 1–1 | Maidstone United (5) | 2,585 |
| 4 | Solihull Moors (5) | 1–2 | AFC Telford United (6) | 1,577 |

| Tie | Home team (tier) | Score | Away team (tier) | Att. |
Replays
Tuesday 26 February 2019
| 3R | Maidstone United (5) | 0–3 | Stockport County (6) | 1,140 |

== Semi-finals ==
=== First leg ===
16 March 2019
15:00

| Leyton Orient (5) | 1–0 | AFC Telford United (6) |
|---|---|---|
| Bonne 53' |

Brisbane Road, Leyton
Attendance: 3,622
Referee: David Rock

16 March 2019
15:00

| AFC Fylde (5) | 0–0 | Stockport County (6) |

Mill Farm, Wesham
Attendance: 2,605
Referee: Marc Edwards

=== Second leg ===
23 March 2019
15:00

| AFC Telford United (6) | 1–2 | Leyton Orient (5) |
|---|---|---|
| Deeney 39' | | Harrold 6'; Coulson 77' |

New Bucks Head, Telford
Attendance: 3,478
Referee: Peter Wright

Leyton Orient won 3–1 on aggregate

23 March 2019
15:00

| Stockport County (6) | 2–3 | AFC Fylde (5) |
|---|---|---|
| Bell 25'; Palmer 88' | | Rowe 65' (pen.); Croasdale 85'; Reid 89' |

Edgeley Park, Stockport
Attendance: 6,064
Referee: Seb Stockbridge

AFC Fylde won 3–2 on aggregate

== Final ==
19 May 2019
16:15

| AFC Fylde | 1–0 | Leyton Orient |
|---|---|---|
| Rowe 60' | Report |

Wembley Stadium, London
Attendance: 42,962
Referee: Andrew Madley

== Top scorers ==
| Rank | Player | Club | Goals |
|---|---|---|---|
| 1 | (England) Danny Rowe | Oldham Athletic | 5 |
| 1 | (England) Matty Warburton | Northampton Town | 5 |
| 1 | (England) Shaq Coulthirst | Barnet | 5 |
| 1 | (England) Glen Taylor | Spennymoor Town | 5 |
| 1 | (Azerbaijan) Serhat Tasdemir | Peterborough United | 5 |
| 1 | (England) Nic Evangelinos | Ramsbottom United | 5 |
| 7 | (Tanzania) Adi Yussuf | Boreham Wood | 3 |
| 7 | (Nigeria) Daniel Udoh | Shrewsbury Town | 3 |
| 7 | (England) Emmanuel Dieseruvwe | Oldham Athletic | 3 |
| 7 | (Zimbabwe) Lee Ndlovu | Brackley Town | 3 |
