= Leon Legge =

English footballer (born 1985)

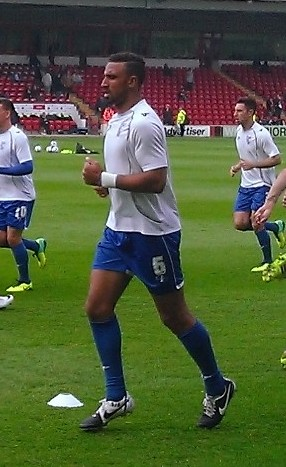
- Legge warming up for Gillingham in 2012

Personal information
- Full name: Leon Clinton Elliott Legge
- Date of birth: 1 July 1985 (age 41)
- Place of birth: Bexhill-on-Sea, England
- Height: 6 ft 4 in (1.93 m)
- Position: Centre-back

Youth career
- 1993–200?: Little Common
- 200?–2002: Sidley United

Senior career*
Years	Team	Apps	(Gls)
2002–2003	Eastbourne United		
2003–2005	Hailsham Town		
2005–2008	Lewes		
2008–2009	Tonbridge Angels		
2009–2013	Brentford	94	(9)
2013	→ Gillingham (loan)	5	(0)
2013–2015	Gillingham	76	(8)
2015–2018	Cambridge United	110	(11)
2018–2022	Port Vale	114	(8)
2022	Harrogate Town	8	(0)
2023	Bootle	6	(1)
Total		413	(37)
- * Club domestic league appearances and goals

Leon Clinton Elliott Legge (born 1 July 1985) is an English former professional footballer who played as a centre-back.

A defender, his strong strength, positioning, and tackling skills have helped him compensate for a lack of natural pace. He was diagnosed with epilepsy at the age of 16, at the time he was playing youth football for Little Common. He went on to spend over seven years in non-League with Sidley United, Eastbourne United, Hailsham Town, Lewes and Tonbridge Angels, whilst also working as a care worker. He turned professional at Brentford in July 2009, entering the English Football League at the age of 24. He was voted Brentford Player of the Year in 2010 and played on the losing side in the 2011 League Trophy final. He joined Gillingham on a loan move that was made permanent in January 2013. He helped the club to win promotion as League Two champions at the end of the 2012–13 season. He moved on to Cambridge United in May 2015 and was named the club's Player of the Year at the end of the 2015–16 season. He served the club as captain before leaving in May 2018 to join Port Vale. He captained Port Vale from October 2019 to January 2021. He joined Harrogate Town on a free transfer in January 2022 but was released at the end of the 2021–22 season. He returned to non-League football with Bootle in July 2023.

== Career ==
=== Early career ===
Legge began his career playing youth football for Little Common at the age of eight. He later played for Sidley United, before joining Sussex County League club Eastbourne United. At the age of 17, Legge joined Hailsham Town, where he was appointed captain, earning trials for Eastbourne Borough and Woking, before joining Conference South club Lewes in the summer of 2005. His three-year spell at Lewes was later described as being "unsuccessful". Following the departure of manager Steve King upon promotion to the Conference National at the end of the 2007–08 season, Legge joined Isthmian League Premier Division side Tonbridge Angels, where he scored 10 goals in 39 appearances. He had a trial at Millwall, but was not taken on. He was handed a professional contract by Brentford in July 2009, who paid Angels a nominal fee plus top-up payments. Before signing as a professional Legge had been working as a care worker for adults with learning difficulties and gave this up when signing for the "Bees". He also worked numerous other jobs during his time as a semi-professional and amateur footballer, including as a bouncer.

=== Brentford ===
Legge made his professional debut in a 1–0 Football League Trophy defeat at Norwich City on 1 September 2009, having been named as an unused substitute in Brentford's two previous matches. Legge made his League One debut in a 2–0 defeat at Yeovil Town on 26 September, coming on as an 86th-minute substitute for Cleveland Taylor. He came close to joining Torquay United on loan, but stayed at Brentford after Mark Phillips picked up an injury. Legge scored his first goal at Griffin Park on 28 November, which was the only goal of the FA Cup second round game against Walsall and helped to earn him the FA's "Player of the Round" award. One month later he signed a contract extension, keeping him at Brentford until at least the end of the 2010–11 season, with manager Andy Scott saying that "Leon has improved since he's been with us and has the potential to improve". The following month, on 26 January, he scored his first league goal, providing the late equaliser in a 1–1 draw with Southampton. Two months later, on 23 March, he scored again in a 3–3 draw against Colchester United. He was named as Brentford Player of the Year at the end of the 2009–10 season and signed a new two-year contract.

Legge continued to retain his first-team status throughout the 2010–11 season and scored four goals against Exeter City, Tranmere Rovers and Charlton Athletic. During the season, the club reached the Football League Trophy final at Wembley Stadium, where they lost 1–0 to Carlisle United; Legge played the full 90 minutes and was booked after 24 minutes. After the match, Legge described playing at Wembley as "privilege", though was disappointed with the result, commenting that "everything went for them [Carlisle] that day". At the end of the season, Legge was linked with two unnamed Championship clubs.

In August 2011, he signed a new contract to keep him at the club until summer 2014. However, not long afterwards he tore his hamstring in a defeat against Tranmere Rovers and was ruled out of action until mid-November. In mid-December, Legge scored two goals in consecutive games against AFC Bournemouth and Milton Keynes Dons. He strained his hamstring in March, though was only sidelined for two weeks. Despite his injuries he still managed to feature 31 times across the 2011–12 season. However, he found his first-team opportunities limited in the 2012–13 season and was forced to settle for a place on the bench due to the arrivals of Tony Craig and Harlee Dean. Following an impressive performance against Oldham Athletic on 22 September, manager Uwe Rösler stated: "It was crucial we had a player like Leon Legge who came on and played to his strengths, he showed what an important player he is for us. He came on and worked well. Players at our level need to understand it's a squad game. They will all play a part."

=== Gillingham ===
On 1 January 2013, Legge joined Gillingham on a month-long loan with a view to a permanent move. Manager Martin Allen said that Legge's signing was "pushing the boat out" and credited chairman Paul Scally for the capture. Legge said that Myles Weston helped to convince him to sign at Priestfield. Legge made his debut for the "Gills" in a 1–0 win over Southend United on New Year's Day. His permanent transfer was confirmed on 31 January, when he signed a two-and-a-half-year contract with the club. On 2 March, he scored Gillingham's goal to help secure a 1–1 draw at Aldershot Town; after the match, Allen praised Legge and Adam Barrett for their performances. He made a total of 22 appearances, scoring two goals, to help Gillingham to win promotion as champions of League Two. He then made 40 appearances during the 2013–14 season, as Gillingham secured their League One status with a 17th-place finish. On 2 November 2013, he was sent off for the first time in his Football League career after picking up two yellow cards in a 1–0 home win over Carlisle United.

He found himself struggling for appearances under manager Peter Taylor early in the 2014–15 season. He was reported to have been made available to go out on loan. This was despite him scoring "two fine headers" in a 3–2 home win over Leyton Orient on 15 November and earning a place on the Football League team of the week. Speaking in April, Legge said that he was keen to extend his deal at the club. However, he left Gillingham after new manager Justin Edinburgh opted not to offer him a new contract, who stated that "Allowing Leon Legge and Gavin Hoyte to go was probably the toughest decision I've made in my management career because they have played the majority of the games since I have taken over. I feel we need to go in a different direction". Despite this, Legge later credited Edinburgh with reigniting his passion for the game.

=== Cambridge United ===
On 19 May 2015, Legge signed a two-year contract with Cambridge United, becoming the club's first signing of the close season. Manager Richard Money said that "it's clear to see he is a big, tall, strong boy who will lead us at the back together with Hughes and Coulson who we already have, which is the beginning of a really good defensive unit". He won a place on the Football League team of the week for his performance in a 1–0 home win over Dagenham & Redbridge on 6 February. His consistency across the 2015–16 season saw him named as the club's Player of the Year as the "U's" posted a ninth-place finish in League Two.

He was named in the EFL team of the week for his performance during a 0–0 draw at Mansfield Town on 3 September 2016. On 1 October, he scored the opening goal in a 2–1 win over Accrington Stanley at the Abbey Stadium, before he was sent off in injury-time for a foul on Terry Gornell. He was appointed as club captain and went on to trigger a one-year contract extension the following month. He was named on the EFL team of the week after scoring a goal and "defending stoutly" in a 5–0 victory over Hartlepool United. He went on to make 52 appearances across the 2016–17 season, contributing seven goals, as Shaun Derry's side again finished in mid-table. However, he was limited to 32 appearances in the 2017–18 season as he missed much of the second half of the season with a shoulder injury and was subsequently unable to dislodge the centre-back partnership of George Taft and Greg Taylor. He was released by new manager Joe Dunne upon the expiry of his contract in May 2018.

=== Port Vale ===
On 23 May 2018, Legge signed a one-year contract with Port Vale. Manager Neil Aspin said that he hoped the experience of Legge would aid the development of young centre-back Nathan Smith. He started the 2018–19 season on the bench after failing to impress during pre-season, before he put in an EFL team of the week performance in his first league start of the season – a 1–0 win over Crawley Town at Vale Park on 18 August. On 22 September, he scored the only goal of the game at local rivals Crewe Alexandra and gave what The Sentinel reporter Michael Baggaley described as "one of the best performances by a Vale centre half for years". He was named in that week's EFL team of week. However, he was dropped following a poor performance in a 3–0 home defeat by Colchester United on 12 January, and was reduced to a place on the bench as Vale switched from a back four to a back three. His absence led to rumours that he was being left out to avoid triggering an appearance clause in his contract that would extend his stay with the "Valiants", before new manager John Askey restored Legge to a reinstated back four on 23 February. He went on to trigger the automatic one-year contract extension.

Legge was handed the club captaincy after Tom Pope lost his first-team place in October; speaking three months later, he said that the club was in an altogether better place following the departure of chairman Norman Smurthwaite, allowing Legge and Smith the chance to form an effective centre-back partnership under the stewardship of Askey. He was named on the EFL team of the week after scoring the opening goal in a 2–2 draw at Walsall on 22 February. He was nominated for that month's League Two Player of the Month award, with the EFL stating that: "The veteran defender's experience was pivotal to victory against fellow promotion contenders Colchester with a goal-saving double-block on the line, while his prowess in the air saw him power home a header at Walsall". He signed a new one-year contract in March. The 2019–20 season ended early that month due to the COVID-19 pandemic in England, with the team in eighth-place, which led Legge to state that the club's progress was merely on hold and the players would return more motivated to achieve promotion the following season.

On 21 November 2020, Legge was sent off after receiving two yellow cards for a tough tackle on Tristan Abrahams and a late challenge on Joss Labadie in a 1–0 defeat at Newport County; Askey said that "he should know better". He marked his 100th appearance for the club with a clean sheet in a 0–0 draw at Bradford City on 29 December. However, he was sent off in his next appearance on 2 January, after picking up two yellow cards a 4–0 defeat at Mansfield Town; Askey said he had been "reckless, stupid really". Askey was sacked two days later and Legge took to Twitter to deny that there had ever been a rift between the players and manager, saying that "a good man lost his job because we as a group of players failed to deliver on the pitch". Interim manager Danny Pugh then moved the captaincy on to Tom Conlon and refused to name Legge in matchday squads following his return from suspension. New manager Darrell Clarke handed Legge his first start since the Mansfield game on 23 February, where he impressed in a 0–0 draw with Stevenage.

On 21 August 2021, Legge picked up a "freak injury" during a 1–1 draw at Stevenage. Clarke reported that following a scan he would be ruled out of action for up to three months. He returned to action on 9 November, coming on as a substitute in an EFL Trophy game, but admitted that he faced "big competition to try to get back in the squad" as the team were in excellent form.

=== Harrogate Town ===
On 11 January 2022, Legge joined fellow League Two side Harrogate Town; manager Simon Weaver said that "we believe he will add aggression and leadership to our group... off the pitch, I know the lads will benefit from his professionalism, knowledge and dedication to the game". He joined Harrogate from Port Vale on the same day that defender Connor Hall moved in the opposite direction. He featured in seven of the first nine games he was available for, but only made one substitute appearance after 22 February and was initially transfer-listed at the end of the 2021–22 season and subsequently left the club in July 2022.

=== Bootle ===
On 21 July 2023, Legge signed for Northern Premier League Division One West side Bootle. On 29 August, he played over 70 minutes in goal after goalkeeper Owen Mooney was sent off, and managed to keep a clean sheet in what finished as a 0–0 draw with Prescot Cables.

== Style of play ==
Legge has been described as a "commanding presence" at centre-back. Though lacking in pace, he has been praised for his strength, positioning and tackling skills. He can also achieve great distances on his long-throws.

== Personal life ==
Legge was born in England and is of Saint Lucian descent. Legge was 16 years old when he discovered he had epilepsy. He is an ambassador for Young Epilepsy and keeps a blog called 'Epilepsy Baller'. He converted to Christianity in 2014. He began co-presenting BBC Radio Stoke's Thursday night Port Vale programme in 2024.

== Career statistics ==
Appearances and goals by club, season and competition
Club	Season	League			FA Cup		League Cup		Other		Total	
Club	Season	Division	Apps	Goals	Apps	Goals	Apps	Goals	Apps	Goals	Apps	Goals
Brentford	2009–10	League One	29	2	3	1	0	0	1 (Note: Appearances in Football League/EFL Trophy)	0	33	3
Brentford	2010–11	League One	30	3	1	0	3	0	6	0	40	3
Brentford	2011–12	League One	28	4	2	0	0	0	1	0	31	4
Brentford	2012–13	League One	7	0	2	0	0	0	2	0	11	0
Brentford	Total		94	9	8	1	3	0	10	0	115	10
Gillingham (loan)	2012–13	League Two	5	0	0	0	0	0	0	0	5	0
Gillingham	2012–13	League Two	17	2	0	0	0	0	0	0	17	2
Gillingham	2013–14	League One	37	2	1	0	1	0	1	0	40	2
Gillingham	2014–15	League One	22	4	1	0	2	0	5	0	30	4
Gillingham	Total		76	8	2	0	3	0	6	0	87	8
Cambridge United	2015–16	League Two	39	3	1	0	0	0	0	0	40	3
Cambridge United	2016–17	League Two	44	6	4	1	1	0	3	0	52	7
Cambridge United	2017–18	League Two	27	2	2	0	1	0	2	0	32	2
Cambridge United	Total		110	11	7	1	2	0	5	0	124	12
Port Vale	2018–19	League Two	35	1	1	0	1	0	0	0	37	1
Port Vale	2019–20	League Two	37	4	3	0	1	0	1	0	42	4
Port Vale	2020–21	League Two	37	3	1	0	1	0	1	0	40	3
Port Vale	2021–22	League Two	5	0	0	0	1	0	2	0	8	0
Port Vale	Total		114	8	5	0	4	0	4	0	127	8
Harrogate Town	2021–22	League Two	8	0	0	0	0	0	0	0	8	0
Bootle	2023–24	Northern Premier League; Division One West	6	1	0	0	0	0	0	0	6	1
Career total			413	37	22	2	12	0	25	0	472	39

== Honours ==
Brentford

- Football League Trophy runner-up: 2010–11

Gillingham

- Football League Two: 2012–13

Individual

- Brentford Player of the Year: 2009–10
- Cambridge United Supporters' Player of the Year: 2015–16
