= 2017–18 Cambridge United F.C. season =

Cambridge United
2017–18 season
- Chairman: Dave Doggett (until 16 December 2017)
- Manager: Shaun Derry (until 9 February 2018)
- Stadium: Abbey Stadium
- League Two: 12th
- FA Cup: Second round Lost to Newport County
- EFL Cup: First round Lost to Bristol Rovers
- EFL Trophy: Eliminated at the group stage

The 2017–18 season is Cambridge United's 106th season in their history, their 39th in the Football League, and their fourth consecutive season in League Two. Along with League Two, the club will also participate in the FA Cup, EFL Cup and EFL Trophy.

The season covers the period from 1 July 2017 to 30 June 2018.

== Squad ==
=== Squad details at start of season ===
No.	Name	Pos.	Nat.	Place of birth	Date of birth	Age	Apps *	Goals *	Signed from	Date signed	Fee	Ends
Goalkeepers
1	David Forde	GK	(Republic of Ireland)	(Republic of Ireland) Galway	20 December 1979	37	0	0	Millwall	20 July 2017	Free	30 June 2018
13	Dimitar Mitov	GK	(Bulgaria)	(Bulgaria) Kozloduy	22 January 1997	20	0	0	Charlton Athletic	5 June 2017	Free	30 June 2019
Defenders
2	Brad Halliday	RB	(England)	Redcar	10 July 1995	21	30	1	Middlesbrough	24 August 2016	Undisclosed	
3	Jake Carroll	LB	(Republic of Ireland)	London	11 August 1991	25	20	0	Hartlepool United	12 January 2017	Undisclosed	30 June 2019
5	Greg Taylor	FB	(England)	Bedford	15 January 1990	27	142	2	Luton Town	20 June 2013	Free	30 June 2018
6	Leon Legge	CB	(England)	Bexhill-on-Sea	1 July 1985	32	83	9	Gillingham	19 May 2015	Free	30 June 2018
12	Mark Roberts	CB	(England)	Northwich	16 October 1983	33	57	4	Fleetwood Town	25 May 2015	Free	30 June 2018
16	Liam O'Neil	RB	(England)	Cambridge	31 July 1993	23	13	1	Chesterfield	31 January 2017	Undisclosed	30 June 2020
24	Leon Davies	RB	(England)	Brighton	22 November 1999	17	5	0	Youth team	22 November 2016	Trainee	30 June 2019
25	Harry Darling	CB	(England)	Cambridge	8 August 1999	18	0	0	Youth team	4 October 2016	Trainee	30 June 2019
Midfielders
4	Gary Deegan	RM	(Republic of Ireland)	(Republic of Ireland) Dublin	28 September 1987	29	0	0	Shrewsbury Town	1 June 2017	Free	30 June 2019
7	Piero Mingoia	RW	(England)	Enfield	20 October 1991	25	40	5	Accrington Stanley	2 June 2016	Free	30 June 2018
8	Luke Berry	CM	(England)	Cambridge	12 July 1992	24	219	51	Barnsley	15 June 2015	Undisclosed	30 June 2019
15	Emmanuel Osadebe	RM	(Republic of Ireland)	(Republic of Ireland) Dundalk	1 October 1996	20	0	0	Gillingham	31 May 2017	Free	30 June 2019
19	David Amoo	RW	(England)	Southwark	13 April 1991	26	0	0	Partick Thistle	24 May 2017	Free	30 June 2018
21	Medy Elito	RM	(England)	(Democratic Republic of the Congo) Kinshasa	20 March 1990	27	23	5	Newport County	14 July 2015	Free	30 June 2018
22	Paul Lewis	CM	(England)		17 December 1994	22	13	0	Macclesfield Town	13 January 2017	Undisclosed	30 June 2020
Forwards
9	Uche Ikpeazu	CF	(England)	Harrow	28 February 1995	22	29	6	Watford	24 August 2016	Free	30 June 2018
10	Ade Azeez	CF	(England)	Orpington	8 January 1994	23	0	0	Partick Thistle	5 July 2017	Undisclosed	30 June 2019
11	Harrison Dunk	LW	(England)	London	25 October 1990	26	200	19	Bromley	7 June 2011	Free	30 June 2018
14	Jabo Ibehre	CF	(England)	Islington	28 January 1983	34	0	0	Carlisle United	26 May 2017	Free	30 June 2018
17	Adam McGurk	CF	(Northern Ireland)	Larne	24 January 1989	28	15	0	Portsmouth	22 July 2016	Undisclosed	30 June 2018
18	George Maris	FW	(England)	Sheffield	6 March 1996	21	23	4	Barnsley	3 June 2016	Free	30 June 2019
20	Jevani Brown	CF	(Jamaica)	Letchworth	16 October 1994	22	0	0	St Neots Town	1 August 2017	Free	30 June 2019
Out on loan
23	Josh Coulson	CB	(England)	Cambridge	28 January 1989	28	272	14	Youth team	1 July 2007	Trainee	30 June 2018
26	Matthew Foy	CF	(England)			18	0	0	Youth team	5 November 2016	Trainee	30 June 2019

Source: Soccerbase

=== Transfers in ===
Date from	Position	Nationality	Name	From	Fee	Ref.
1 July 2017	RW	(England)	David Amoo	Partick Thistle	Free	
1 July 2017	MF	(Republic of Ireland)	Gary Deegan	Shrewsbury Town	Free	
1 July 2017	CF	(England)	Jabo Ibehre	Carlisle United	Free	
1 July 2017	GK	(Bulgaria)	Dimitar Mitov	Charlton Athletic	Free	
1 July 2017	RM	(Republic of Ireland)	Emmanuel Osadebe	Gillingham	Free	
5 July 2017	CF	(England)	Ade Azeez	Partick Thistle	Undisclosed	
20 July 2017	GK	(Republic of Ireland)	David Forde	Millwall	Free	
1 August 2017	CF	(Jamaica)	Jevani Brown	St Neots Town	Free	
12 January 2018	CF	(Republic of Ireland)	Barry Corr	Cambridge United	Non-contract	(Note: On 6 February it was announced that Corr had signed a contract until the end of the season.)

=== Transfers out ===
Date from	Position	Nationality	Name	To	Fee	Ref.
1 July 2017	CF	(Republic of Ireland)	Barry Corr	Free agent	Released	
1 July 2017	CM	(England)	James Dunne	Swindon Town	Released	(Note: Dunne joined Swindon Town following his release.)
1 July 2017	GK	(England)	David Gregory	Bromley	Released	(Note: Gregory joined Bromley following his release)
1 July 2017	CM	(England)	Conor Newton	Hartlepool United	Released	(Note: Newton joined Hartlepool United following his release)
1 July 2017	CF	(England)	Joe Pigott	Maidstone United	Released	(Note: Pigott joined Maidstone United following his release.)
1 July 2017	RM	(England)	Dylan Williams	St Neots Town	Released	(Note: Williams joined St Neots Town following his release.)
1 July 2017	CF	(England)	Ben Williamson	Eastleigh	Released	(Note: Williamson joined Eastleigh following his release.)
11 July 2017	GK	(England)	Will Norris	Wolverhampton Wanderers	Undisclosed	
24 August 2017	CB	(England)	Mark Roberts	Forest Green Rovers	Mutual consent	(Note: Roberts joined Forest Green Rovers following his departure.)
25 August 2017	CM	(England)	Luke Berry	Luton Town	Undisclosed	
31 August 2017	CF	(Northern Ireland)	Adam McGurk	Morecambe	Mutual consent	(Note: McGurk joined Morecambe following his departure.)
7 January 2018	CB	(England)	Josh Coulson	Leyton Orient	Mutual consent	

=== Loans in ===
Date from	Position	Nationality	Name	From	Date until	Ref.
12 August 2017	CB	(England)	Kyle Howkins	West Bromwich Albion	2 January 2018	
31 August 2017	CB	(England)	George Taft	Mansfield Town	2 January 2018	
3 January 2018	CM	(England)	Adam Phillips	Norwich City	5 May 2018	
12 January 2018	CF	(England)	Billy Waters	Northampton Town	5 May 2018	
29 January 2018	CB	(England)	George Taft	Mansfield Town	5 May 2018	

=== Loans out ===
Date from	Position	Nationality	Name	To	Date until	Ref.
28 July 2017	CB	(England)	Josh Coulson	Leyton Orient	1 January 2018	
28 July 2017	FW	(England)	Matthew Foy	St Neots Town	11 September 2017	
8 September 2017	RB	(England)	Harry Darling	Hampton & Richmond Borough	6 October 2017	
29 September 2017	CM	(England)	Paul Lewis	Dover Athletic	27 October 2017	
2 November 2017	RB	(England)	Harry Darling	Royston Town	30 November 2017	
5 January 2018	CM	(England)	Tom Knowles	St Ives Town	2 February 2018	
18 January 2018	RM	(Republic of Ireland)	Emmanuel Osadebe	Newport County	5 May 2018	
23 February 2018	CF	(England)	Ade Azeez	Dover Athletic	22 March 2018	

=== Squad statistics this season ===
As of match played 3 March 2018

No.	Nat.	Player	Pos.	League Two				FA Cup				EFL Cup				EFL Trophy				Total			
No.	Nat.	Player	Pos.	Apps	Goal	Yellow card	Red card	Apps	Goal	Yellow card	Red card	Apps	Goal	Yellow card	Red card	Apps	Goal	Yellow card	Red card	Apps	Goal	Yellow card	Red card
1	(Republic of Ireland)	David Forde	GK	36		2		2												38		2	
2	(England)	Brad Halliday	RB	33		5		2								1				36		5	
3	(Republic of Ireland)	Jake Carroll	LB	18+8		2		2				0+1				3		1		23+9		3	
4	(Republic of Ireland)	Gary Deegan	CM	32		4						0+1				1				33+1		4	
5	(England)	Greg Taylor	FB	33				2				1				2+1				38+1			
6	(England)	Leon Legge	CB	24	2	1	1	2		1		1				2		1		29	2	3	1
7	(England)	Piero Mingoia	RW	17+5				1								2	1			20+5	1		
8	(England)	Luke Berry	AM	3																3			
8	(England)	Billy Waters	CF	9	1															9	1		
9	(England)	Uche Ikpeazu	CF	31+3	12	9	1	2				1	1			1				35+3	13	9	1
10	(England)	Ade Azeez	CF	5+7				0+1				1				0+1				6+9			
11	(England)	Harrison Dunk	LW	19+6	1	2		0+1				1		1		0+2				20+9	1	3	
12	(England)	Mark Roberts	CB																				
12	(England)	George Taft	CB	16+2	1	1		0+1												16+3	1	1	
13	(Bulgaria)	Dimitar Mitov	GK									1				3				4			
14	(England)	Jabo Ibehre	CF	15+7	5		1	2	1							1+1				18+8	6		1
15	(Republic of Ireland)	Emmanuel Osadebe	RM	0+4								1				1+1				2+5			
16	(England)	Liam O'Neil	CM	16+7		2		2								3				22+7		2	
17	(Northern Ireland)	Adam McGurk	CF																				
17	(England)	Adam Phillips	CM	4		1														4		1	
18	(England)	George Maris	AM	24+3	5	2		1			1					1				26+6	5	2	1
19	(England)	David Amoo	RW	2+13	1			0+1				1				0+1				3+15	1		
20	(Jamaica)	Jevani Brown	CF	26+5	4	3		2				0+1				3				31+6	4	3	
21	(England)	Medy Elito	RM	22+8	4	2		1				1				2+1				26+9	4	2	
22	(England)	Paul Lewis	AM	2+5		2		0+1				1				2		1		5+6		3	
23	(England)	Josh Coulson	CB																				
23	(Republic of Ireland)	Barry Corr	CF	2+3																2+3			
24	(England)	Leon Davies	RB	3												1				4			
25	(England)	Harry Darling	CB	3								1				1				5			
26	(England)	Matthew Foy	FW													2				2			
27	(England)	Kyle Howkins	CB	0+2												1				1+2			
33	(England)	Ben Worman	MF													0+1				0+1			
Own goals					0				0				0				0				0		
Totals					36	38	3		1	1	1		1	1	0		1	3	0		39	43	4

=== Suspensions ===
Date Incurred	Name	Games Missed	Reason
7 October 2017	Leon Legge	1	(red card) (vs. Wycombe Wanderers)
5 November 2017	George Maris	1	(red card) (vs. Sutton United)
11 November 2017	Uche Ikpeazu	1	Yellow card
9 December 2017	Uche Ikpeazu	1	(red card) (vs. Port Vale)
30 December 2017	Jabo Ibehre	3	(red card) (vs. Crewe Alexandra)

== Competitions ==
=== Pre-season matches ===
Win Draw Loss

As of 7 June 2017, Cambridge United have announced ten pre-season friendlies against Norwich City (two one hour matches), Southend United, Tottenham Hotspur U23, St Neots Town, St Albans City, Royston Town, Ebbsfleet United, Dartford and Hemel Hempstead Town.

8 July 2017 Friendly	St Neots Town	0−1	Cambridge United	St Neots
15:00 BST		Report	Ibehre 90'	Stadium: Rowley Park; Attendance: 692; Referee: Neil Hair

11 July 2017 Friendly	St Albans City	0−1	Cambridge United	St Albans
19:30 BST		Report	Berry 25'	Stadium: Clarence Park

12 July 2017 Friendly	Royston Town	1−4	Cambridge United	Royston
19:45 BST	Frendo 4'	Report	Ikpeazu (penalty missed) 2' 6', 18'; Lewis 42'; Maris 73'	Stadium: Garden Walk

15 July 2017 Friendly	Cambridge United	0–2	Norwich City	Cambridge
14:00 BST (60 min match)		Report	Murphy 15'; Godfrey 17'	Stadium: Abbey Stadium; Attendance: 2,663

15 July 2017 Friendly	Cambridge United	0–0	Norwich City	Cambridge
15:30 BST (60 min match)		Report		Stadium: Abbey Stadium; Attendance: 2,663

18 July 2017 Friendly	Ebbsfleet United	0–2	Cambridge United	Northfleet
19:30 BST	Kedwell (penalty missed) 75'	Report	Foy 57'; McGurk 70'	Stadium: Stonebridge Road; Attendance: 382

21 July 2017 Testimonial	Cambridge United	2–3	Tottenham Hotspur U23	Cambridge
19:45 BST	Berry 53'; Ikpeazu 90+3'	Report	Harrison 13' (pen.), 40', 65'	Stadium: Abbey Stadium; Attendance: 2,188; Referee: Chris Pollard

22 July 2017 Friendly	Dartford	1–1	Cambridge United	Dartford
15:00 BST	Mfula 8'	Report	McGurk 46'	Stadium: Princes Park; Attendance: 355

25 July 2017 Friendly	Woking	0–0	Cambridge United	Woking
19:45 BST		Report		Stadium: Kingfield Stadium; Attendance: 622; Referee: Graham Horwood

26 July 2017 Friendly	Hemel Hempstead Town	P–P	Cambridge United	Hemel Hempstead
19:45 BST				Stadium: Vauxhall Road
Note: The match was called off due to a waterlogged pitch.

29 July 2017 Fundraising Game	Cambridge United	0–2	Southend United	Cambridge
15:00 BST	Berry (penalty missed) 57'	Report	Fortuné 36' (pen.); Robinson 88'	Stadium: Abbey Stadium; Attendance: 1,236; Referee: David Rock

=== League Two ===
==== League table ====
Pos	Team	Pld	W	D	L	GF	GA	GD	Pts
10	Carlisle United	46	17	16	13	62	54	+8	67
11	Newport County	46	16	16	14	56	58	−2	64
12	Cambridge United	46	17	13	16	56	60	−4	64
13	Colchester United	46	16	14	16	53	52	+1	62
14	Crawley Town	46	16	11	19	58	66	−8	59

Source: BBC Sport
Rules for classification: 1) Points; 2) Goal difference; 3) Number of goals scored

==== Results summary ====
Overall								Home						Away					
Pld	W	D	L	GF	GA	GD	Pts	W	D	L	GF	GA	GD	W	D	L	GF	GA	GD
36	13	10	13	36	46	−10	49	10	5	3	23	13	+10	3	5	10	13	33	−20

Last updated: 3 March 2018.
Source: BBC Sport

==== Results by matchday ====
Matchday	1	2	3	4	5	6	7	8	9	10	11	12	13	14	15	16	17	18	19	20	21	22	23	24	25	26	27	28	29	30	31	32	33	34	35	36	37	38	39	40	41	42	43	44	45	46
Ground	A	H	A	H	H	A	A	H	A	H	A	H	A	H	H	A	H	A	A	H	A	H	A	H	H	A	H	A	A	A	H	A	H	H	A	H	A	H	A	H	A	H	A	H	A	H
Result	L	L	W	D	W	L	W	W	L	W	L	L	D	W	W	D	D	L	D	W	L	L	D	W	W	D	D	L	L	L	D	W	W	W	L	D	D	L	D							
Position	19	22	17	18	12	15	13	7	11	10	12	14	15	13	11	10	12	14	15	13	13	13	16	14	12	12	12	13	15	15	14	14	14	13	14	13	14	14	14							

Updated to match(es) played on 3 March 2018. Source: BBC Sport
A = Away; H = Home; W = Win; D = Draw; L = Loss

==== Matches ====
On 21 June 2017, the fixtures for the forthcoming season were announced.

Win Draw Loss

5 August 2017 1	Exeter City	1−0	Cambridge United	Exeter
15:00 BST	Reid (penalty missed) 3' 5'	Report	Deegan (yellow card) 35'	Stadium: St James Park; Attendance: 4,282 (318 away); Referee: Trevor Kettle

12 August 2017 2	Cambridge United	1−2	Carlisle United	Cambridge
15:00 BST	Elito 14' (pen.) (yellow card) 51'	Report	Lambe 8'; Parkes 39' (yellow card) 75'	Stadium: Abbey Stadium; Attendance: 4,102 (364 away); Referee: Tom Nield

19 August 2017 3	Crawley Town	0−1	Cambridge United	Crawley
15:00 BST	Roberts (yellow card) 34'	Report	Legge (yellow card) 10'; Ikpeazu (yellow card) 40'; Ibehre 63'	Stadium: Broadfield Stadium; Attendance: 2,059 (388 away); Referee: Charles Breakspear

26 August 2017 4	Cambridge United	0−0	Morecambe	Cambridge
15:00 BST		Report	Lund (yellow card) 34'; Conlan (yellow card) 49'	Stadium: Abbey Stadium; Attendance: 3,573 (54 away); Referee: Graham Horwood

2 September 2017 5	Cambridge United	1−0	Colchester United	Cambridge
15:00 BST	Elito (yellow card) 33'; Brown (yellow card) 50'; Ikpeazu 64' (yellow card) 90+4'	Report	Murray (yellow card) 34'; Kinsella (yellow card) 45'; Vincent-Young (yellow card) 50'; Lapslie (yellow card) 90+3'	Stadium: Abbey Stadium; Attendance: 4,511 (791 away); Referee: Nick Kinseley

9 September 2017 6	Barnet	3−1	Cambridge United	Barnet
15:00 BST	Vilhete 40', 90+5'; Taylor (yellow card) 57'; Coulthirst 62'	Report	Legge 71'; Halliday (yellow card) 90+7'	Stadium: Hive Stadium; Attendance: 2,031 (683 away); Referee: Antony Coggins

12 September 2017 7	Crewe Alexandra	0−1	Cambridge United	Crewe
19:45 BST		Report	Ibehre 35'	Stadium: Gresty Road; Attendance: 3,184 (141 away); Referee: Graham Salisbury

16 September 2017 8	Cambridge United	2−1	Coventry City	Cambridge
15:00 BST	Ibehre 10'; Ikpeazu 76'; Maris (yellow card) 82'	Report	Vincenti (yellow card) 33'; Kelly (yellow card) 36'; Nazon 54' (yellow card) 71'	Stadium: Abbey Stadium; Attendance: 5,142 (1,209 away); Referee: Mark Heywood

23 September 2017 9	Mansfield Town	2–1	Cambridge United	Mansfield
15:00 BST	Mellis 65' (pen.); Rose 87' (yellow card) 90+6'	Report	Legge 58'; Ikpeazu (yellow card) 90+4'	Stadium: Field Mill; Attendance: 3,814 (349 away); Referee: Ben Toner

26 September 2017 10	Cambridge United	3–0	Forest Green Rovers	Cambridge
19:45 BST	Ibehre 15'; Ikpeazu 55', 61'	Report		Stadium: Abbey Stadium; Attendance: 3,545 (79 away); Referee: Ross Joyce

30 September 2017 11	Swindon Town	2–0	Cambridge United	Swindon
15:00 BST	Anderson 13'; Smith 88'	Report	Deegan (yellow card) 6'	Stadium: County Ground; Attendance: 5,847 (326 away); Referee: Andy Woolmer

7 October 2017 12	Cambridge United	1–3	Wycombe Wanderers	Cambridge
15:00 BST	Ikpeazu (yellow card) 45+1'; Maris (yellow card) 45+5'; Legge (yellow card) 63' (yellow-red card) 82'; Elito 70' (pen.)	Report	Stewart (yellow card) 45+3'; Eze 48', 57'; Saunders (yellow card) 72'; Umerah 89'	Stadium: Abbey Stadium; Attendance: 5,365 (568 away); Referee: Gavin Ward

14 October 2017 13	Lincoln City	0–0	Cambridge United	Lincoln
15:00 BST	Palmer (yellow card) 34'; Habergham (yellow card) 39'; Rhead (yellow card) 90+2'	Report		Stadium: Sincil Bank; Attendance: 8,803 (542 away); Referee: Kevin Johnson

17 October 2017 14	Cambridge United	2–1	Yeovil Town	Cambridge
19:45 BST	Ikpeazu 20'; Maris 26'	Report	Dickson (yellow card) 20'; Mugabi 60'	Stadium: Abbey Stadium; Attendance: 3,328 (91 away); Referee: Andy Haines

21 October 2017 15	Cambridge United	2–1	Chesterfield	Cambridge
15:00 BST	Brown 70'; Ikpeazu 78'	Report	Dennis 55'; Briggs (yellow card) 69'; Evatt (yellow card) 84'; Flores (yellow card) 90+1'	Stadium: Abbey Stadium; Attendance: 4,529 (422 away); Referee: John Busby

28 October 2017 16	Grimsby Town	0–0	Cambridge United	Cleethorpes
15:00 BST	Dembélé (yellow card) 20'; Berrett (yellow card) 55'	Report	O'Neil (yellow card) 26'; Halliday (yellow card) 53'	Stadium: Blundell Park; Attendance: 4,091 (214 away); Referee: Seb Stockbridge

11 November 2017 17	Cambridge United	0–0	Accrington Stanley	Cambridge
15:00 GMT	Ikpeazu (yellow card) 90'; Halliday (yellow card) 90+4'	Report	Kee (yellow card) 24'; Johnson (yellow card) 61'; Thorniley (yellow card) 69'; Conneely (yellow card) 81'	Stadium: Abbey Stadium; Attendance: 4,402 (173 away); Referee: Graham Horwood

18 November 2017 18	Luton Town	7–0	Cambridge United	Luton
15:00 GMT	O.Lee (yellow card) 19' (goal) 31'; Potts 24'; Shinnie (yellow card) 37'; Hylton (yellow card) 32' (goal) 35', 81', 90+2'; E.Lee 45+3', 88'	Report	Lewis (yellow card) 63'; Brown (yellow card) 90'	Stadium: Kenilworth Road; Attendance: 8,721 (642 away); Referee: Nick Kinseley

21 November 2017 19	Cheltenham Town	0–0	Cambridge United	Cheltenham
19:45 GMT		Report	Forde (yellow card) 56'	Stadium: Whaddon Road; Attendance: 2,266 (152 away); Referee: John Busby

25 November 2017 20	Cambridge United	1–0	Stevenage	Cambridge
15:00 GMT	Lewis (yellow card) 22'; Dunk (yellow card) 77'; Ikpeazu 88'	Report	Henry (yellow card) 30'	Stadium: Abbey Stadium; Attendance: 4,039 (474 away); Referee: Brett Huxtable

9 December 2017 21	Port Vale	2–0	Cambridge United	Burslem
15:00 BST	Montaño 45', 47'	Report	Ikpeazu (yellow card) 86' (yellow-red card) 90+1'	Stadium: Vale Park; Attendance: 3,129 (205 away); Referee: Antony Coggins

16 December 2017 22	Cambridge United	1–2	Newport County	Cambridge
15:00 GMT	Halliday (yellow card) 56'; Brown 76'	Report	McCoulsky 42'; White (yellow card) 57'; Nouble (yellow card) 66'; Labadie (yellow card) 80' (goal) 90+4'	Stadium: Abbey Stadium; Attendance: 3,632 (143 away); Referee: Chris Sarginson

23 December 2017 23	Notts County	3–3	Cambridge United	Nottingham
15:00 GMT	Alessandra 74'; Brisley (yellow card) 53' (goal) 87'; Forte 90+3'	Report	Ikpeazu (yellow card) 14' (goal) 40'; Brown (yellow card) 21' (goal) 49', 68'; Carroll (yellow card) 72'; Forde (yellow card) 90+1'	Stadium: Meadow Lane; Attendance: 6,102 (377 away); Referee: Anthony Backhouse

26 December 2017 24	Cambridge United	1–0	Barnet	Cambridge
15:00 GMT	Maris 62'	Report	Brindley (yellow card) 41'; Blackman (yellow card) 53'; Akinde (yellow card) 77'; Taylor (yellow card) 87'	Stadium: Abbey Stadium; Attendance: 4,639 (229 away); Referee: Graham Salisbury

30 December 2017 25	Cambridge United	3–1	Crewe Alexandra	Cambridge
15:00 GMT	Maris 1'; Amoo 27'; Ikpeazu 70'; Ibehre (red card) 90+2'	Report	Dagnall 30'; Stubbs (yellow card) 57'	Stadium: Abbey Stadium; Attendance: 4,165 (182 away); Referee: Craig Hicks

1 January 2018 26	Colchester United	0–0	Cambridge United	Colchester
15:00 GMT		Report	Carroll (yellow card) 81'	Stadium: Community Stadium; Attendance: 4,789 (777 away); Referee: Charles Breakspear

6 January 2018	Coventry City	P–P	Cambridge United	Coventry
15:00 GMT				Stadium: Ricoh Arena
Note: On 13 December, it was announced that the away trip to face Coventry City was rearranged due to the Sky Blues continued FA Cup involvement.

13 January 2018 27	Cambridge United	0–0	Mansfield Town	Cambridge
15:00 GMT		Report	Angol (yellow card) 22'; MacDonald (yellow card) 53'	Stadium: Abbey Stadium; Attendance: 4,324 (499 away); Referee: Trevor Kettle

20 January 2018 28	Forest Green Rovers	5–2	Cambridge United	Nailsworth
15:00 GMT	Doidge 18', 82'; Grubb 43', 74'; Campbell 90+4'	Report	Maris 3'; Carroll (yellow card) 22'; Elito 25'; Ikpeazu (yellow card) 64'	Stadium: New Lawn; Attendance: 2,228 (273 away); Referee: Ben Toner

27 January 2018	Cambridge United	P–P	Notts County	Cambridge
15:00 GMT				Stadium: Abbey Stadium
Note: match postponed due to Notts County's continued FA Cup involvement.

30 January 2018 29	Coventry City	3–1	Cambridge United	Coventry
19:45 GMT	McNulty 10' (yellow card) 81'; Shipley 30'; McDonald (yellow card) 38'; Stokes (yellow card) 87'; Doyle 90+2'	Report	Taft 84'	Stadium: Ricoh Arena; Attendance: 6,897 (493 away); Referee: Tom Nield

3 February 2018 30	Yeovil Town	2–0	Cambridge United	Yeovil
15:00 GMT	Smith 54'; James (yellow card) 70'; Fisher 84'	Report		Stadium: Huish Park; Attendance: 2,569 (151 away); Referee: Darren Drysdale

9 February 2018 31	Cambridge United	0–0	Lincoln City	Cambridge
19:45 GMT	Taft (yellow card) 37'; Phillips (yellow card) 57'	Report	Eardley (yellow card) 47'; Wharton (yellow card) 76'	Stadium: Abbey Stadium; Attendance: 5,775 (1,678 away); Referee: Darren England

13 February 2018 32	Chesterfield	2–3	Cambridge United	Chesterfield
19:45 GMT	Rowley 1'; Dennis 55'; Reed (yellow card) 61'; O'Grady (yellow card) 85'	Report	Maguire 21' (o.g.); Dunk (yellow card) 46' (goal) 90+5'; Ikpeazu 67' (pen.); Halliday (yellow card) 80'	Stadium: Proact Stadium; Attendance: 4,276 (220 away); Referee: Darren Handley

17 February 2018 33	Cambridge United	3–1	Grimsby Town	Cambridge
15:00 GMT	Ikpeazu 19'; Waters 67'; Maris 71'	Report	Hooper 90' (pen.)	Stadium: Abbey Stadium; Attendance: 4,739 (797 away); Referee: Dean Whitestone

20 February 2018 34	Cambridge United	1–0	Notts County	Cambridge
19:45 GMT	Elito 30'	Report	Grant (yellow card) 56'	Stadium: Abbey Stadium; Attendance: 3,524 (321 away); Referee: Charles Breakspear

24 February 2018 35	Accrington Stanley	1–0	Cambridge United	Accrington
15:00 GMT	Hughes (yellow card) 39'; Jackson 57'; Johnson (yellow card) 90+3'	Report	Ikpeazu (yellow card) 38'; Deegan (yellow card) 65'; O'Neil (yellow card) 76'	Stadium: Crown Ground; Attendance: 1,819; Referee: Robert Lewis

3 March 2018 36	Cambridge United	1–1	Luton Town	Cambridge
15:00 GMT	Deegan (yellow card) 34'; Ibehre 83'	Report	Collins 33' (red card) 73'; Downes (yellow card) 57'; Potts (yellow card) 79'	Stadium: Abbey Stadium; Attendance: 6,722 (2,405 away); Referee: John Brooks

10 March 2018 37	Wycombe Wanderers	1–1	Cambridge United	High Wycombe
15:00 GMT	Akinfenwa 45+4'	Report	Ibehre (yellow card) 45+3'; Waters (yellow card) 68'; Lewis 90+3'	Stadium: Adams Park; Attendance: 4,426; Referee: Nick Kinseley

17 March 2018 38	Cambridge United	1–3	Swindon Town	Cambridge
15:00 GMT	Ikpeazu 73'	Report	Norris 16'; Richards 62', 84' (pen.)	Stadium: Abbey Stadium; Attendance: 5,123; Referee: Lee Swabey

24 March 2018 39	Carlisle United	1–1	Cambridge United	Carlisle
	Bennett 47'	Report	Maris 50'; Brown (yellow card) 62'; Deegan (yellow card) 77'	Stadium: Brunton Park; Attendance: 4,652; Referee: Richard Clark

30 March 2018 40	Cambridge United	3–1	Crawley Town	Cambridge
15:00 BST	Ibehre 4'; Maris 22'; Brown 58'	Report	Payne 49' (pen.)	Stadium: Abbey Stadium; Attendance: 4,131; Referee: Craig Hicks

7 April 2018 41	Cambridge United	2–3	Exeter City	Cambridge
15:00 BST	Ibehre 42'; Maris 67'	Report	Stockley 59'; Jay 84'; Taylor 87'	Stadium: Abbey Stadium; Attendance: 4,054; Referee: Martin Coy

14 April 2018 42	Stevenage	0–2	Cambridge United	Stevenage
15:00 BST		Report	Corr 54', 83'; Carroll (yellow card) 81'	Stadium: Broadhall Way; Attendance: 3,269; Referee: Tom Nield

21 April 2018 43	Cambridge United	4–3	Cheltenham Town	Cambridge
15:00 BST	Taft 10'; Elito (penalty missed) 45+3'; Maris 53'; Brown 60' (pen.); Corr 81'	Report	Lloyd 3'; Eisa 13', 79'; Atangana (yellow card) 61'; Sellars (yellow card) 84'	Stadium: Abbey Stadium; Attendance: 3,853; Referee: Brett Huxtable

24 April 2018 44	Morecambe	0–0	Cambridge United	Morecambe
19:45 BST	Lavelle (yellow card) 56'; Kenyon (yellow card) 78'	Report	Carroll (yellow card) 55'	Stadium: Globe Arena; Attendance: 992; Referee: Ross Joyce

28 April 2018 45	Newport County	2–1	Cambridge United	Newport
15:00 BST	Demetriou 26'; Nouble (yellow card) 48' (goal) 59'	Report	Corr (yellow card) 48'; Maris 81'	Stadium: Rodney Parade; Attendance: 3,412; Referee: Graham Salisbury

5 May 2018 46	Cambridge United	5–0	Port Vale	Cambridge
15:00 BST	Amoo 33'; Dunk 35'; Halliday 68'; Corr 74'; Waters 78'	Report		Stadium: Abbey Stadium; Attendance: 4,808; Referee: Craig Hicks

=== FA Cup ===
On 16 October 2017, Cambridge United were drawn at home to Sutton United in the first round. An away trip to Newport County was confirmed for the second round.

5 November 2017 First round	Cambridge United	1–0	Sutton United	Cambridge
14:00 GMT	Maris (yellow card) 17' (yellow-red card) 40'; Ibehre 45'	Report	Lafayette (yellow card) 86'	Stadium: Abbey Stadium; Attendance: 3,070 (468 away); Referee: Darren Handley

3 December 2017 Second round	Newport County	2–0	Cambridge United	Newport
14:00 GMT	Labadie 2', 82'; Nouble (yellow card) 75'	Report	Legge (yellow card) 43'	Stadium: Rodney Parade; Attendance: 2,748 (178 away); Referee: Kevin Johnson

=== EFL Cup ===
On 16 June 2017, Cambridge United were drawn away to Bristol Rovers in the first round.

8 August 2017 First round	Bristol Rovers	4−1	Cambridge United	Horfield
19:45 BST	Bodin 13', 42'; Harrison 61'; Sercombe 70'	Report	Dunk (yellow card) 3'; Ikpeazu 66'	Stadium: Memorial Stadium; Attendance: 4,114; Referee: Kevin Johnson

=== EFL Trophy ===
On 12 July 2017, Cambridge United were drawn in Southern Section Group H along with Northampton Town, Peterborough United and Southampton U23s.

Pos	Lge	Team	Pld	W	PW	PL	L	GF	GA	GD	Pts	Qualification
1	L1	Peterborough United (A)	3	2	0	1	0	5	1	+4	7	Round 2
2	L1	Northampton Town (A)	3	0	3	0	0	5	5	0	6	Round 2
3	ACA	Southampton U23s (E)	3	1	0	1	1	4	5	−1	4	
4	L2	Cambridge United (E)	3	0	0	1	2	1	4	−3	1	

Updated to match(es) played on 3 October 2017. Source: EFL.com
(A) Advances to a further round; (E) Eliminated

Win Draw Loss

29 August 2017 Group match 1	Northampton Town	1–1 (5–4 p)	Cambridge United	Northampton
19:45 BST	Waters (yellow card) 16'; Revell 29'	Report	Mingoia 27'; Legge (yellow card) 84'	Stadium: Sixfields Stadium; Attendance: 1,453 (143 away); Referee: John Brooks
	Penalties
	Revell (penalty scored); Iaciofano (penalty scored); Waters (penalty scored); McWilliams (penalty scored); Taylor (penalty scored)		Elito (penalty scored); Mingoia (penalty scored); Brown (penalty scored); O'Neil (penalty missed); Azeez (penalty scored)

3 October 2017 Group match 2	Cambridge United	0–1	Southampton U23s	Cambridge
19:00 BST	Carroll (yellow card) 34'	Report	Jones 36'	Stadium: Abbey Stadium; Attendance: 480; Referee: Charles Breakspear

7 November 2017 Group match 3	Cambridge United	0–2	Peterborough United	Cambridge
19:45 GMT	Lewis (yellow card) 55'	Report	Taylor 50'; Edwards (yellow card) 64'; Marriott 81'	Stadium: Abbey Stadium; Attendance: 3,138 (1,123 away); Referee: Gavin Ward
