= 2014–15 Cambridge United F.C. season =

Cambridge United F.C.
2014–15 season
- Chairman: Dave Doggett
- Manager: Richard Money
- League Two: 19th
- FA Cup: 4th round (replay) (knocked out by Manchester United)
- League Cup: 1st round (knocked out by Birmingham City)
- Football League Trophy: 1st round (knocked out by Crawley Town)
- Top goalscorer: League: Tom Elliott, Robbie Simpson, (8); All: Robbie Simpson, (9)
Home colours	Away colours	Third colours

The 2014–15 was the 102nd full season in the history of Cambridge United, in which it competed in the League Two, along with various cup competitions.

== Match details ==
=== Pre-season ===
26 July 2014	Braintree Town	1–2	Cambridge United	Braintree
15:00 BST	Davis 3'	Report	Elliott 9', 70'	Stadium: Cressing Road

29 July 2014	Cambridge United	3–1	Milton Keynes Dons	Cambridge
19:45 BST	Donaldson 20'; Appiah 31', 43'	Report	Hitchcock 33'	Stadium: Abbey Stadium

=== League Two ===
==== League table ====
Pos	Team	Pld	W	D	L	GF	GA	GD	Pts
17	Accrington Stanley	46	15	11	20	58	77	−19	56
18	York City	46	11	19	16	46	51	−5	52
19	Cambridge United	46	13	12	21	61	66	−5	51
20	Carlisle United	46	14	8	24	56	74	−18	50
21	Mansfield Town	46	13	9	24	38	62	−24	48

Updated to match(es) played on 23 May 2015. Source: BBC Sport
Rules for classification: 1) Points; 2) Goal difference; 3) Number of goals scored

==== Matches ====
The fixtures for the 2014–15 season were announced on 18 June 2014 at 9am.

9 August 2014 1	Cambridge United	1–0	Plymouth Argyle	Cambridge
15:00 BST (UTC+01)	Coulson 61'	Report		Stadium: Abbey Stadium; Attendance: 6,009 (1,221 away); Referee: Graham Scott

16 August 2014 2	Portsmouth	2–1	Cambridge United	Portsmouth
15:00 BST (UTC+01)	Webster (yellow card) 18'; Taylor 34'; Webster (red card) 44'; Dunn 66' (o.g.)	Report	Appiah 69'	Stadium: Fratton Park; Attendance: 16,671 (1,180 away); Referee: Darren Sheldrake

19 August 2014 3	York City	2–2	Cambridge United	York
19:45 BST (UTC+01)	Hyde 43'; Fletcher 82' (pen.)	Report	Elliott 27'; Appiah 38' (pen.)	Stadium: Bootham Crescent; Attendance: 3,176 (291 away); Referee: Richard Clark

23 August 2014 4	Cambridge United	1–2	Morecambe	Cambridge
15:00 BST (UTC+01)	Elliott 55'	Report	Mullin 16', 61'	Stadium: Abbey Stadium; Attendance: 3,152 (103 away); Referee: Charles Breakspear

30 August 2014 5	Cambridge United	5–0	Carlisle United	Cambridge
15:00 BST (UTC+01)	Diallo 25'; Simpson 33', 45'; Stockley 83', 87'	Report		Stadium: Abbey Stadium; Attendance: 3,512 (366 away); Referee: Carl Berry

8 September 2014 6	Newport County	1–1	Cambridge United	Newport
19:45 BST (UTC+01)	Willmott 90'		Chadwick 48'	Stadium: Rodney Parade; Attendance: 2,594 (121 away); Referee: Steve Martin

13 September 2014 7	Dagenham & Redbridge	2–3	Cambridge United	Dagenham
15:00 BST (UTC+01)	Howell 20'; Porter 82'		Donaldson 54'; Nelson 61'; Bird 77'	Stadium: Victoria Road; Attendance: 2,049 (770 away); Referee: Andy Woolmer

16 September 2014 8	Cambridge United	1–2	Exeter City	Cambridge
19:45 BST (UTC+01)	Bird 8'	Report	Cummins 17'; Nicholls 63'	Stadium: Abbey Stadium; Attendance: 3,266 (155 away); Referee: Chris Kavanagh

20 September 2014 9	Cambridge United	0–1	Luton Town	Cambridge
15:00 BST (UTC+01)	Naylor (red card) 54'	Report	Cullen 81'	Stadium: Abbey Stadium; Attendance: 6,533 (2,050 Away); Referee: Graham Salisbury

27 September 2014 10	Wycombe Wanderers	1–0	Cambridge United	High Wycombe
15:00 BST (UTC+01)	Hayes 63'	Report	Dunk (yellow card) 33'; Nelson (yellow card) 45+2'; Tait (yellow card) 90+2'	Stadium: Adams Park; Attendance: 3,610 (418 away); Referee: Darren Handley

3 October 2014 11	Burton Albion	1–3	Cambridge United	Burton upon Trent
19:45 BST (UTC+01)	MacDonald (yellow card) 39'; Edwards (yellow card) 45+3'; Mousinho (yellow card) 45+4'; Akins 81'	Report	Elliott 35', 76'; Donaldson 64'	Stadium: Pirelli Stadium; Attendance: 2,683 (452 away); Referee: Mick Russell

11 October 2014 12	Cambridge United	5–1	Oxford United	Cambridge
12:15 BST (UTC+01)	Appiah 41', 45'; Donaldson 54'; Elliott 59'; Simpson 89'	Report	Hylton 9'; Howard (yellow card) 29'; Whing (yellow card) 74'; Collins (yellow card) 83'	Stadium: Abbey Stadium; Attendance: 4,435 (493 away); Referee: Andy D'Urso

18 October 2014 13	Mansfield Town	0–0	Cambridge United	Mansfield
15:00 BST (UTC+01)	Bell (yellow card) 9'; Sendles-White (yellow card) 18'	Report	Appiah (yellow card) 19'; Tait (yellow card) 21'; Donaldson (yellow card) 37'	Stadium: Field Mill; Attendance: 2,925 (410 away); Referee: Mark Heywood

21 October 2014 14	Cambridge United	1–2	Cheltenham Town	Cambridge
19:45 BST (UTC+01)	Appiah 25'	Report	Richards 10' (yellow card) 53'; Marquis (yellow card) 24'; Brown (yellow card) 30'; Vaughan (yellow card) 38'; Coulson 55' (o.g.)	Stadium: Abbey Stadium; Attendance: 3,252 (118 away); Referee: Pat Miller

25 October 2014 15	Cambridge United	2–1	Hartlepool United	Cambridge
15:00 BST (UTC+01)	Donaldson 27'; Dunk 87'	Report	Austin (yellow card) 9'; Walker 59' (yellow card) 76'; Crooks (yellow card) 71'	Stadium: Abbey Stadium; Attendance: 4,931 (195 away); Referee: Kevin Johnson

1 November 2014 16	Bury	2–0	Cambridge United	Bury
15:00 GMT	Adams 13'; Soares (yellow card) 15'; Rose 28'; Duffus (yellow card) 77'	BBC Report	Donaldson (yellow card) 69'; Coulson (yellow card) 76'	Stadium: Gigg Lane; Attendance: 3,704 (376 away); Referee: Graham Horwood

14 November 2014 17	Cambridge United	2–1	Northampton Town	Cambridge
19:45 GMT	Cunnington 51'; Bird 79'; Hughes (yellow card) 81'	BBC Report	Toney 50'	Stadium: Abbey Stadium; Attendance: 5,644 (1,084 away); Referee: Trevor Kettle

22 November 2014 18	Accrington Stanley	2–1	Cambridge United	Accrington
15:00 GMT	Mingoia 34', 72'	Report	Tait (yellow card) 41'; Nelson 90'	Stadium: Crown Ground; Attendance: 1,364 (225 away); Referee: Richard Clark

29 November 2014 19	AFC Wimbledon	1–2	Cambridge United	Kingston upon Thames
15:00 GMT	Tubbs 2'; Bulman (yellow card) 85'	Report	Appiah 12'; Hughes 58'	Stadium: Kingsmeadow; Attendance: 4,306 (827 away); Referee: Michael Bull

13 December 2014 20	Cambridge United	0–0	Shrewsbury Town	Cambridge
15:00 GMT	Simpson (yellow card) 16'	Report	Demetriou (yellow card) 54'; Knight-Percival (yellow card) 75'	Stadium: Abbey Stadium; Attendance: 5,346 (346 away); Referee: Tim Robinson

19 December 2014 21	Tranmere Rovers	1–1	Cambridge United	Tranmere
19:45 GMT	Donacien (yellow card) 29'; Laird (yellow card) 63'; Stockton 74'	Report	Simpson (yellow card) 41' (yellow-red card) 76'; Nelson 89'	Stadium: Prenton Park; Attendance: 4,578 (204 away); Referee: Darren Handley

26 December 2014 22	Cambridge United	0–1	Southend United	Cambridge
13:00 GMT		Report	Corr 57'; Worrall (yellow card) 73'; Leonard (yellow card) 90'	Stadium: Abbey Stadium; Attendance: 7,053 (1,292 away); Referee: Oliver Langford

28 December 2014 23	Stevenage	3–2	Cambridge United	Stevenage
15:00 GMT	Lee 14'; Pett 32'; Parrett 38'; Charles (yellow card) 65'; Beardsley (yellow card) 86'	Report	Bird 22'; Cunnington 85'	Stadium: Broadhall Way; Attendance: 4,579 (1,624 away); Referee: Fred Graham

10 January 2015 24	Carlisle United	0–1	Cambridge United	Carlisle
15:00 GMT	Young (yellow card) 69'	Report	Hughes 48'; Kaikai (yellow card) 75'; Elliott (yellow card) 78'	Stadium: Brunton Park; Attendance: 3,406 (199 away); Referee: Mark Heywood

17 January 2015 25	Cambridge United	4–0	Newport County	Cambridge
15:00 GMT	McGeehan 12', 64'; Kaikai 43'; Hughes 79'; Chiedozie (yellow card) 90+5'	Report	Zebroski (yellow card) 15'; Jackson (yellow card) 28'; O'Connor (yellow card) 45+1'	Stadium: Abbey Stadium; Attendance: 6,076 (284 away); Referee: Stuart Attwell

27 January 2015 26	Cambridge United	1–1	Dagenham & Redbridge	Cambridge
15:00 GMT	McGeehan 23'; Champion (yellow card) 86'	Report	Hemmings 61'; Obileye (yellow card) 63'; Bingham (yellow card) 69'	Stadium: Abbey Stadium; Attendance: 4,068 (128 away); Referee: Gary Sutton

31 January 2015 27	Luton Town	3–2	Cambridge United	Luton
15:00 GMT	Drury 19'; Wilkinson 31'; Smith 45+2'; Whalley (yellow card) 45+1'; Doyle (yellow card) 76'	Report	Hunt 67'; Simpson 86'; Champion (yellow card) 74'	Stadium: Kenilworth Road; Attendance: 10,054 (939 away); Referee: Jeremy Simpson

7 February 2015 28	Cambridge United	0–1	Wycombe Wanderers	Cambridge
15:00 GMT	McGeehan (red card) 55'	Report	Bloomfield (yellow card) 49'; Ephraim 53'	Stadium: Abbey Stadium; Attendance: 6,894 (701 away); Referee: Andy Davies

10 February 2015 29	Exeter City	2–2	Cambridge United	Exeter
19:45 GMT	Nichols 65'; Wheeler 88'	Report	Coulson (yellow card) 30'; Simpson 37'; Woodman 50' (o.g.); Nelson (yellow card) 77'	Stadium: St James Park; Attendance: 3,012 (105 away); Referee: Mick Russell

14 February 2015 30	Plymouth Argyle	2–0	Cambridge United	Plymouth
15:00 GMT	Brunt 81'; Alessandra 84'	Report	Donaldson (yellow card) 90+2'	Stadium: Home Park; Attendance: 6,413 (196 away); Referee: Iain Williamson

21 February 2015 31	Cambridge United	2–6	Portsmouth	Cambridge
15:00 GMT	Mendez-Laing 22'; Simpson 54'	Report	Wallace 2'; Hollands (yellow card) 9'; Tubbs 24', 45+3', 81'; Robinson 33'; Whatmough (yellow card) 47'; Taylor 74'; Atangana (yellow card) 90+3'	Stadium: Abbey Stadium; Attendance: 6,528 (1,433 away); Referee: Seb Stockbridge

24 February 2015 32	Cambridge United	0–0	AFC Wimbledon	Cambridge
19:45 GMT		Report		Stadium: Abbey Stadium; Attendance: 4,259 (318 away); Referee: Gavin Ward

28 February 2015 33	Morecambe	0–2	Cambridge United	Morecambe
15:00 GMT	Wilson (yellow card) 61'; Edwards (yellow card) 76'	Report	Donaldson 45'; Slew 59'; Harrold (yellow card) 61'; Champion (yellow card) 85'	Stadium: Globe Arena; Attendance: 1,593 (206 away); Referee: Darren Handley

3 March 2015 34	Cambridge United	0–3	York City	Cambridge
19:45 GMT	Harrold (yellow card) 8'	Report	Benning (yellow card) 18'; Fletcher 43'; Coulson 49'; Hyde 55'	Stadium: Abbey Stadium; Attendance: 4,037 (226 away); Referee: Andy Woolmer

7 March 2015 35	Shrewsbury Town	1–1	Cambridge United	Shrewsbury
15:00 GMT	Grant 16'; Grandison (yellow card) 35'; Barnett (yellow card) 71'; Goldson (yellow card) 78'; Gayle (yellow card) 89'	Report	Harrold (yellow card) 43'; Donaldson (yellow card) 58'; Kaikai 90+5'	Stadium: New Meadow; Attendance: 5,075 (298 away); Referee: Michael Bull

14 March 2015 36	Cambridge United	1–1	Stevenage	Cambridge
15:00 GMT	Tait (yellow card) 81'; Simpson 90+4'	Report	Wells 17'; Dembélé (yellow card) 32'; Parrett (yellow card) 42'; Okimo (yellow card) 52'; Martin (yellow card) 57'; Lee (yellow card) 80'	Stadium: Abbey Stadium; Attendance: 5,503 (926 away); Referee: Graham Horwood

17 March 2015 37	Cambridge United	1–2	Tranmere Rovers	Cambridge
19:45 GMT	Kaikai 63'	Report	Jennings (yellow card) 29' (red card) 79'; Power 45+1'; Laird (yellow card) 50'; Gardner 68' (yellow card) 69'; Myrie-Williams (yellow card) 83'	Stadium: Abbey Stadium; Attendance: 4,202 (164 away); Referee: Keith Stroud

21 March 2015 38	Southend United	0–0	Cambridge United	Southend
15:00 GMT	Timlin (yellow card) 90+4'	Report	Donaldson (yellow card) 90+3'	Stadium: Roots Hall; Attendance: 7,224 (791 away); Referee: Brendan Malone

28 March 2015 39	Hartlepool United	2–1	Cambridge United	Hartlepool
15:00 GMT	Walker 20' (yellow card) 90'; Harrison 67'	Report	Harrold 32'	Stadium: Victoria Park; Attendance: 5,009 (269 away); Referee: Andy Haines

3 April 2015 40	Cambridge United	0–2	Bury	Cambridge
15:00 BST (UTC+01)		Report	Eaves (yellow card) 16'; Cameron 23'; Soares 53'; Mayor (yellow card) 90+1'	Stadium: Abbey Stadium; Attendance: 5,427 (566 away); Referee: Mark Brown

6 April 2015 41	Northampton Town	0–1	Cambridge United	Northampton
15:00 BST (UTC+01)		Report	Dunk 1'; Ball (yellow card) 90+5'	Stadium: Sixfields Stadium; Attendance: 5,520 (912 away); Referee: Fred Graham

11 April 2015 42	Cambridge United	2–2	Accrington Stanley	Cambridge
15:00 BST (UTC+01)	Elliott 8'; Bird 79'	Report	Mingoia 39'; Buxton (yellow card) 45'; Conneely 90+1'; Hunt (yellow card) 90+4'	Stadium: Abbey Stadium; Attendance: 5,569 (59 away); Referee: Chris Sarginson

14 April 2015 43	Cheltenham Town	3–1	Cambridge United	Cheltenham
19:45 BST (UTC+01)	Harrad 2' (yellow card) 76'; Haynes 57'; Sparrow 75'	Report	Bird 33'; Donaldson (yellow card) 90+3'	Stadium: Whaddon Road; Attendance: 2,415 (212 away); Referee: Gary Sutton

18 April 2015 44	Cambridge United	3–1	Mansfield Town	Cambridge
15:00 BST (UTC+01)	Kaikai 3', 43'; Elliott 88'; Nelson (yellow card) 90+3'	Report	Thomas (yellow card) 31'; Ravenhill (yellow card) 46'; Bingham 64'; Clements (yellow card) 77'	Stadium: Abbey Stadium; Attendance: 4,667 (274 away); Referee: Kevin Wright

25 April 2015 45	Oxford United	2–0	Cambridge United	Oxford
15:00 BST (UTC+01)	Roofe 31'; Hylton 45+8'; Collins (yellow card) 49'; MacDonald (yellow card) 76'	Report		Stadium: Kassam Stadium; Attendance: 5,954 (607 away); Referee: Carl Berry

2 May 2015 46	Cambridge United	2–3	Burton Albion	Cambridge
15:00 BST (UTC+01)	Elliott 25'; Simpson 69' (pen.)	Report	Beavon 11'; Taft (yellow card) 55'; McLaughlin (red card) 67'; Mousinho (yellow card) 69'; Edwards 77'; McCrory (yellow card) 86'; Stewart 88'	Stadium: Abbey Stadium; Attendance: 7,109; Referee: Oliver Langford

=== FA Cup ===
The draw for the first round of the FA Cup was made on 27 October 2014.

8 November 2014 Round One	Cambridge United	1–0	Fleetwood Town	Cambridge
15:00	Appiah 80'	Report	Hitchcock (yellow card) 68'; Proctor (red card) 73'	Stadium: Abbey Stadium; Attendance: 2,870 (94 away); Referee: Gary Sutton

6 December 2014 Round Two	Cambridge United	2–2	Mansfield Town	Cambridge
15:00	Chadwick 10'; Taylor (yellow card) 78'; Appiah 90+2' (yellow card) 90+3'	Report	Bingham 3'; Tafazolli (yellow card) 60'; Champion 81' (o.g.); Taylor (yellow card) 90+1'	Stadium: Abbey Stadium; Attendance: 3,869 (343 away); Referee: Darren Bond

16 December 2014 Replay	Mansfield Town	0–1	Cambridge United	Mansfield
19:45	Sutton (yellow card) 28'; Waterfall (yellow card) 51'; Beevers (yellow card) 77'	Report	Kaikai 10'	Stadium: Field Mill; Attendance: 1,920 (305 away); Referee: Carl Boyeson

3 January 2015 Third round	Cambridge United	2–1	Luton Town	Cambridge
15:00	Simpson 27'; Donaldson 66'	Report	Tyler (yellow card) 27'; Miller (yellow card) 34'; Harriman 74'	Stadium: Abbey Stadium; Attendance: 7,063 (1,380 away); Referee: Tony Harrington

23 January 2015 Fourth Round	Cambridge United	0–0	Manchester United	Cambridge
19:55	McGeehan (yellow card) 69'	Report	Fellaini (yellow card) 26'; Wilson (yellow card) 65'	Stadium: Abbey Stadium; Attendance: 7,987 (1,400 away); Referee: Chris Foy

3 February 2015 Replay	Manchester United	3–0	Cambridge United	Manchester
20:05	Mata 25'; Rojo 32'; Wilson 73'	Report		Stadium: Old Trafford; Attendance: 74,511 (6,609 away); Referee: Jonathan Moss

=== League Cup ===
The draw for the first round was made on 17 June 2014 at 10am. Cambridge United were drawn away to Birmingham City.

12 August 2014 Round One	Birmingham City	3–1 (a.e.t.)	Cambridge United	Birmingham
19:45	Donaldson 16'; Caddis 96'; Duffy 105+1'	Report	Donaldson 38'	Stadium: St Andrew's; Attendance: 9,816 (1,064 away); Referee: Tim Robinson

=== Football League Trophy ===
2 September 2014 Round One	Crawley Town	2–0	Cambridge United	Crawley
19:45	Tait 54' (o.g.); Banya 77'	Report		Stadium: Broadfield Stadium; Attendance: 1,252 (141 away); Referee: Gavin Ward

== Transfers ==
Players transferred in
Date	Pos.	Name	Club transferred from	Fee	Ref.
7 June 2014	MF	(England) Luke Chadwick	(England) Milton Keynes Dons	Free	
9 June 2014	FW	(England) Robbie Simpson	(England) Leyton Orient	Free	
10 June 2014	GK	(England) Chris Dunn	(England) Yeovil Town	Free	
11 June 2014	MF	(England) Johnny Hunt	(Wales) Wrexham	Compensation	
14 July 2014	ST	Spain Victor Moreno	Free Agency	Free	
5 August 2014	MF	(France) Issaga Diallo	(Hungary) Kaposvári Rákóczi	Free	
14 August 2014	MF	(England) Sam Whittall	(England) Wolverhampton Wanderers	Free	
26 August 2014	DF	(England) Michael Nelson	(Scotland) Hibernian	Free	
28 August 2014	DF	(Italy) Matteo Lanzoni	(England) Yeovil Town	Free	
1 September 2014	FW	(England) Ryan Bird	(England) Portsmouth	Free	
25 November 2014 (Note: Will officially join club on 1 January 2015.)	FW	(Republic of Ireland) Rory Gaffney	(Republic of Ireland) Limerick	Free	
28 November 2014	FW	(England) Jordan Chiedozie	(England) Concord Rangers	Free	
22 December 2014 (Note: Will officially join club on 3 January 2015.)	MF	(Republic of Ireland) Gearóid Morrissey	(Republic of Ireland) Cork City	Free	
6 February 2015	FW	(England) Jordan Slew	(England) Blackburn Rovers	Free	
Players transferred out
Date	Pos.	Name	Club transferred to	Fee	Ref.
27 May 2014	FW	(England) Matthew Barnes-Homer	(England) Whitehawk	Free	
27 May 2014	DF	(England) Scott Garner	(England) Boston United	Free	
27 May 2014	DF	(England) Blaine Hudson	(Wales) Wrexham	Free	
27 May 2014	FW	(England) Andy Pugh	(England) Dartford	Free	
27 May 2014	DF	(England) Kevin Roberts	(England) FC Halifax Town	Free	
27 May 2014	FW	(England) Sam Smith	(England) AFC Telford United	Free	
19 June 2014	MF	(England) Ashley Chambers	(England) Dagenham & Redbridge	Free	
29 July 2014	MF	(England) Luke Berry	(England) Barnsley	Undisclosed	
Players loaned in
Date	Pos.	Name	Club loaned from	Loan end date	Ref.
10 July 2014	FW	(England) Kwesi Appiah	(England) Crystal Palace	January 2015	
23 July 2014	DF	(England) Harry Lennon	(England) Charlton Athletic	January 2015	
22 August 2014	FW	(England) Jayden Stockley	(England) Bournemouth	January 2015	
18 September 2014	DF	(England) Tom Naylor	(England) Derby County	22 October 2014	
17 November 2014	MF	(England) Matty Blair	(England) Fleetwood Town	31 December 2014	
27 November 2014	DF	(England) Wes Atkinson	(England) West Bromwich Albion	3 January 2015	
27 November 2014	MF	(England) Sullay Kaikai	(England) Crystal Palace	3 January 2015	
13 January 2015	MF	(Northern Ireland) Cameron McGeehan	(England) Norwich City	16 February 2015	
22 January 2015	DF	(England) Dominic Ball	(England) Tottenham Hotspur	30 June 2015	
18 February 2015	MF	(England) Nathaniel Mendez-Laing	(England) Peterborough United	5 May 2015	
23 February 2015	FW	(England) Matt Harrold	(England) Crawley Town	30 June 2015	
13 March 2015	FW	(England) Johnny Margetts	(England) Hull City	30 June 2015	
Players loaned out
Date	Pos.	Name	Club loaned to	Loan Duration	Ref.
20 July 2014	MF	(England) Nathan Arnold	(England) Grimsby Town	30 June 2015	
22 August 2014	FW	(England) Adam Cunnington	(England) Bristol Rovers	23 November 2014	
25 November 2014	DF	(Italy) Matteo Lanzoni	(England) Hartlepool United	31 December 2014	
25 February 2015	FW	(England) Ryan Bird	(England) Hartlepool United	23 March 2015	

== See also ==
- 2014–15 in English football
- 2014–15 Football League Two
