= 2015–16 Cambridge United F.C. season =

Cambridge United
2015–16 season
- Chairman: Dave Doggett
- Manager: Richard Money until 2 November 2015; Shaun Derry from 12 November 2015
- Stadium: Abbey Stadium
- League Two: 9th
- FA Cup: 2nd round (knocked out by Doncaster Rovers)
- League Cup: 1st round (knocked out by Rotherham United)
- League Trophy: 1st round (knocked out by Dagenham & Redbridge)
- Top goalscorer: League: Luke Berry, Barry Corr, Ben Williamson (12 each); All: Luke Berry (13)
Home colours	Away colours	Third colours

The 2015–16 season was Cambridge United's 103rd season in their history and their second consecutive season in League Two. Along with League Two, the club also competed in the FA Cup, League Cup and League Trophy. The season covered the period from 1 July 2015 to 30 June 2016.

== Squad ==
=== Squad details at start of season ===
No.	Name	Pos.	Nat.	Place of Birth	Age	Apps *	Goals *	Signed from	Date signed	Fee	Ends
Goalkeepers
1	Chris Dunn	GK	(England)	Havering	38	43	0	Yeovil Town	10 June 2014	Free	2016
13	Sam Beasant	GK	(England)	Hendon	38	0	0	Stevenage	3 July 2015	Free	2016
Defenders
2	Elliot Omozusi	RB	(England)	Hackney	37	0	0	Leyton Orient	12 June 2015	Free	2017
3	Greg Taylor	LB	(England)	Bedford	36	89	0	Luton Town	20 June 2013	Free	2017
5	Mark Roberts	CB	(England)	Northwich	42	0	0	Fleetwood Town	25 May 2015	Free	2017
6	Leon Legge	CB	(England)	Bexhill-on-Sea	41	0	0	Gillingham	19 May 2015	Free	2017
14	Josh Coulson	CB	(England)	Cambridge	37	242	13	Academy	6 October 2007 #	Trainee	2016
22	George Taft	LB	(England)	Leicester	33	0	0	Burton Albion	31 July 2015	Loanee	January 2016
29	Danny Burns	CB	(England)		29	0	0	Academy		Trainee	2016
Midfielders
4	Keith Keane	CM	(Republic of Ireland)	Luton	39	0	0	Preston North End	27 May 2015	Free	2017
7	Ryan Donaldson	AM	(England)	Newcastle upon Tyne	35	78	12	Gateshead	23 May 2013	Free	2017
8	Luke Berry	CM	(England)	Cambridge	34	128	22	Barnsley	15 June 2015	Undisclosed	2019
11	Harrison Dunk	LW	(England)	London	35	101	12	Bromley	7 June 2011	Free	2016
16	Gearóid Morrissey	CM	(Republic of Ireland)	Cork, Ireland	34	8	0	Cork City	22 December 2014	Free	2016
17	Liam Hughes	AM	(England)	Rotherham	34	145	13	Academy	9 November 2010 #	Trainee	2016
18	Jeff Hughes	LM	(Northern Ireland)	Larne	41	0	0	Fleetwood Town	14 July 2015	Free	2017
24	Conor Newton	CM	(England)	Newcastle upon Tyne	34	0	0	Rotherham United	16 July 2015	Free	2017
27	Matt Lowe	CM	(England)		30	0	0	Academy		Trainee	2016
28	Ryan Horne	CM	(England)		30	0	0	Academy		Trainee	2016
32	Dylan Williams	RM	(England)		17	0	0	Academy		Trainee	2016
Forwards
9	Jordan Slew	CF	(England)	Sheffield	33	13	1	Blackburn Rovers	6 February 2015	Free	2016
10	Barry Corr	CF	(Republic of Ireland)	Newcastle, Ireland	41	0	0	Southend United	2 June 2015	Free	2017
15	Robbie Simpson	CF	(England)	Poole	41	67	25	Leyton Orient	9 June 2014	Free	2016
19	Daniel Carr	CF	(England)	Lambeth	32	0	0	Huddersfield Town	25 June 2015	Free	2017
20	Jordan Chiedozie	CF	(England)	Bournemouth	32	6	0	Concord Rangers	28 November 2014	Free	2016
21	Rory Gaffney	CF	(Republic of Ireland)	Galway, Ireland	36	0	0	Limerick	25 November 2014	Free	2016
26	James Akintunde	CF	(England)	Brent	30	1	0	Academy	14 February 2015 #	Trainee	2016
Out on Loan
	Will Norris	GK	(England)	Watford	33	18	0	Royston Town	16 July 2012	Free	2017

* Player appearances and goals for the club as of beginning of 2015–16 season.
# Date of first team debut

=== Transfers in ===
Date from	Position	Nationality	Name	From	Fee	Ref.
1 July 2015	CM	ENG	Luke Berry	Barnsley	Undisclosed	
1 July 2015	CF	ENG	Daniel Carr	Huddersfield Town	Free transfer	
1 July 2015	CF	IRL	Barry Corr	Southend United	Free transfer	
1 July 2015	CM	IRL	Keith Keane	Preston North End	Free transfer	
1 July 2015	CB	ENG	Leon Legge	Gillingham	Free transfer	
1 July 2015	RB	ENG	Elliot Omozusi	Leyton Orient	Free transfer	
1 July 2015	CB	ENG	Mark Roberts	Fleetwood Town	Free transfer	
3 July 2015	GK	ENG	Sam Beasant	Stevenage	Free transfer	
14 July 2015	LM	NIR	Jeff Hughes	Fleetwood Town	Free transfer	
16 July 2015	CM	ENG	Conor Newton	Rotherham United	Free transfer	
14 January 2016	CM	ENG	James Dunne	Portsmouth	Free transfer	
15 January 2016	FW	ENG	Ben Williamson	Gillingham	Undisclosed	
30 January 2016	FW	ENG	Jimmy Spencer	Notts County	Free transfer	

=== Transfers out ===
Date from	Position	Nationality	Name	To	Fee	Ref.
1 July 2015	AM	ENG	Nathan Arnold	Grimsby Town (Note: Following Arnold's release he joined Grimsby Town.)	Free transfer	
1 July 2015	LM	AUS	Mitch Austin	Central Coast Mariners (Note: Following Austin's release he joined Central Coast Mariners.)	Free transfer	
1 July 2015	ST	ENG	Ayrton Bevins	Free agent	Released	
1 July 2015	CF	ENG	Ryan Bird	Yeovil Town (Note: Following Bird's release he joined Yeovil Town.)	Free transfer	
1 July 2015	CM	ENG	Tom Champion	Barnet (Note: Following Champion's release he joined Barnet.)	Free transfer	
1 July 2015	RM	ENG	Luke Chadwick	Free agent	Released	
1 July 2015	CF	ENG	Tom Elliott	AFC Wimbledon (Note: Following Elliott's release he joined AFC Wimbledon.)	Free transfer	
1 July 2015	DM	ENG	Johnny Hunt	Chester (Note: Following Hunt's release he joined Chester.)	Free transfer	
1 July 2015	CB	ITA	Matteo Lanzoni	Free agent	Released	
1 July 2015	CB	ENG	Ian Miller	Free agent	Released	
1 July 2015	CB	ENG	Michael Nelson	Barnet (Note: Following Nelson's release he joined Barnet.)	Free transfer	
1 July 2015	RB	SCO	Richard Tait	Grimsby Town (Note: Following Tait's release he joined Grimsby Town.)	Free transfer	
1 July 2015	LM	ENG	Bobby-Joe Taylor	Maidstone United (Note: Following Taylor's release he joined Maidstone United.)	Free transfer	
10 December 2015	CM	IRE	Gearóid Morrissey	Cork City	Free transfer	
29 December 2015	CF	ENG	Jordan Chiedozie	Boreham Wood (Note: Following Chiedozie's release he joined Boreham Wood.)	Free transfer	
14 January 2016	CF	IRL	Rory Gaffney	Bristol Rovers	Undisclosed	
30 January 2016	AM	ENG	Liam Hughes	Inverness Caledonian Thistle	Free transfer	
1 February 2016	CF	ENG	Jordan Slew	Chesterfield (Note: Following Slew's release he joined Chesterfield.)	Free transfer	

=== Loans in ===
Date from	Position	Nationality	Name	From	Date until	Ref.
31 July 2015	LB	ENG	George Taft	Burton Albion	28 October 2015	
21 August 2015	CF	ENG	Jacob Blyth	Leicester City	21 September 2015	
1 September 2015	LB	ENG	Mickey Demetriou	Shrewsbury Town	4 January 2016	
15 October 2015	RB	SLE	Alie Sesay	Leicester City	15 November 2015	
19 November 2015	CB	ENG	Terry Kennedy	Sheffield United	2 January 2016	
19 November 2015	FW	ENG	Ben Williamson	Gillingham	3 January 2016	
20 November 2015	MF	ENG	Ryan Ledson	Everton	End of season	
24 November 2015	RB	ENG	Cameron Gayle	Oxford United	24 January 2016	
26 November 2015	MF	NIR	Jordan Jones	Middlesbrough	18 December 2015	
2 January 2016	DF	ENG	Lewis Page	West Ham United	6 March 2016	
5 January 2016	DF	ENG	Darnell Furlong	Queens Park Rangers	End of season	
16 January 2016	FW	ENG	Karlan Ahearne-Grant	Charlton Athletic	13 February 2016	
1 February 2016	DF	USA	Shane O'Neill	Apollon Limassol	End of season	
13 February 2016	DF	ENG	Ryan Haynes	Coventry City	End of season	
5 March 2016	MF	ENG	Zeli Ismail	Wolverhampton Wanderers	End of season	
25 March 2016	MF	ENG	Max Clark	Hull City	22 April 2016	

=== Loans out ===
Date from	Position	Nationality	Name	To	Date until	Ref.
7 July 2015	GK	ENG	Will Norris	Braintree Town	8 January 2016	
18 August 2015	FW	ENG	Jordan Chiedozie	Braintree Town	17 September 2015	
11 September 2015	DF	ENG	Danny Burns	Lowestoft Town	16 October 2015	
18 September 2015	MF	ENG	Matt Lowe	Wealdstone	17 October 2015	
17 October 2015	FW	ENG	James Akintunde	Brackley Town	16 November 2015	
30 October 2015	DF	ENG	Danny Burns	Bishop's Stortford	29 November 2015	
3 November 2015	MF	ENG	Ryan Horne	St Neots Town	23 November 2015	
7 November 2015	MF	ENG	Matt Lowe	Wealdstone	6 December 2015	
26 November 2015	FW	IRL	Rory Gaffney	Bristol Rovers	3 January 2016	
26 November 2015	FW	ENG	Daniel Carr	Aldershot Town	9 January 2016	
2 January 2016	MF	NIR	Jeff Hughes	Tranmere Rovers	End of Season	
2 January 2016	DF	ENG	Danny Burns	Lowestoft Town	End of Season	
8 January 2016	MF	ENG	Matt Lowe	Brackley Town	End of Season	
14 January 2016	MF	IRL	Keith Keane	Stevenage	20 February 2016	
6 February 2016	MF	ENG	Dylan Williams	Soham Town Rangers	12 April 2016	
5 March 2016	FW	ENG	Daniel Carr	Woking	9 April 2016	
5 March 2016	FW	ENG	James Akintunde	Needham Market	9 April 2016	
5 March 2016	GK	ENG	Sam McDermid	Soham Town Rangers	9 April 2016	
25 March 2016	MF	IRL	Keith Keane	Stevenage	22 April 2016	

=== Appearances ===
No.	Nat.	Player	Pos.	League Two	FA Cup	League Cup	Football League Trophy	Total
1	(England)	Chris Dunn	GK	11	1	1		13
2	(England)	Elliot Omozusi	DF	9+5	1	1		11+5
3	(England)	Greg Taylor	DF	12+4	2	1		15+4
4	(Republic of Ireland)	Keith Keane	MF	3+1		1		4+1
5	(England)	Mark Roberts	DF	26+4	2	1	1	30+4
6	(England)	Leon Legge	DF	39	1			40
7	(England)	Ryan Donaldson	MF	18+12	2	0+1		20+13
8	(England)	Luke Berry	MF	41+5	2	1	1	45+5
9	(England)	Jordan Slew	FW	4+6		1	1	6+6
10	(Republic of Ireland)	Barry Corr	FW	19+3	2			21+3
11	(England)	Harrison Dunk	MF	41+4	2	0+1		43+5
12	(England)	Jacob Blyth	FW	2+3			1	3+3
12	(Sierra Leone)	Alie Sesay	DF	5	1			6
12	(England)	Terry Kennedy	DF	2				2
12	(England)	Lewis Page	DF	6				6
12	(England)	Max Clark	MF	7+2				7+2
13	(England)	Sam Beasant	GK	14+1	1		1	16+1
14	(England)	Josh Coulson	DF	22+1		1	1	24+1
15	(England)	Robbie Simpson	FW	14+17	1+1	1	0+1	16+19
16	(Republic of Ireland)	Gearóid Morrissey	MF	0+2			1	1+2
16	(England)	James Dunne	MF	19				19
17	(England)	Liam Hughes	MF	11+5	0+1		0+1	11+7
17	(United States)	Shane O'Neill	DF	1+1				1+1
18	(Northern Ireland)	Jeff Hughes	MF	7+2	1		1	9+2
19	(England)	Daniel Carr	FW	1+3		1	0+1	2+4
20	(England)	Jordan Chiedozie	FW	0+2				0+2
20	(England)	Karlan Ahearne-Grant	FW	1+2				1+2
20	(England)	Zeli Ismail	MF	8+3				8+3
21	(Republic of Ireland)	Rory Gaffney	FW	3+3	0+1			3+4
21	(England)	Jimmy Spencer	FW	11+7				11+7
22	(England)	George Taft	DF	10+1		1	1	12+1
22	(England)	Ben Williamson	FW	27+1				27+1
23	(England)	Ryan Ledson	MF	27	1			28
24	(England)	Conor Newton	MF	16+6	1+1	0+1	1	18+8
25	(England)	Mickey Demetriou	DF	12+3	1+1		1	14+4
25	(England)	Darnell Furlong	DF	21				21
26	(England)	James Akintunde	FW					
27	(England)	Matt Lowe	MF					
28	(England)	Ryan Horne	MF					
29	(England)	Danny Burns	DF					
32	(England)	Dylan Williams	MF	0+1				0+1
33	(England)	Leon Davies	DF					
34	(England)	Cameron Gayle	DF	4				4
34	(England)	Ryan Haynes	DF	10				10
35	(Northern Ireland)	Jordan Jones	MF	1				1
35	(England)	Will Norris	GK	21				21

=== Goalscorers ===
No.	Nat.	Player	Pos.	League Two	FA Cup	League Cup	Football League Trophy	Total
5	(England)	Mark Roberts	DF	2				2
6	(England)	Leon Legge	DF	3				3
7	(England)	Ryan Donaldson	MF	2				2
8	(England)	Luke Berry	MF	12	1			13
10	(Republic of Ireland)	Barry Corr	FW	12				12
11	(England)	Harrison Dunk	MF	4				4
12	(England)	Jacob Blyth	FW	1				1
14	(England)	Josh Coulson	DF	1				1
15	(England)	Robbie Simpson	FW	4				4
16	(England)	James Dunne	MF	1				1
18	(Northern Ireland)	Jeff Hughes	MF		1			1
20	(England)	Zeli Ismail	MF	1				1
21	(Republic of Ireland)	Rory Gaffney	FW	2				2
21	(England)	Jimmy Spencer	FW	6				6
22	(England)	George Taft	DF	1				1
22	(England)	Ben Williamson	FW	12				12
34	(England)	Cameron Gayle	DF	1				1
Own Goals				1				1
Totals				66	2	0	0	68

=== Yellow cards ===
No.	Nat.	Player	Pos.	League Two	FA Cup	League Cup	Football League Trophy	Total
3	(England)	Greg Taylor	DF		1			1
4	(Republic of Ireland)	Keith Keane	MF	1				1
5	(England)	Mark Roberts	DF	5	1			6
6	(England)	Leon Legge	DF	4				4
7	(England)	Ryan Donaldson	MF	1				1
8	(England)	Luke Berry	MF	8	1			9
9	(England)	Jordan Slew	FW	1				1
10	(Republic of Ireland)	Barry Corr	FW	3	1			4
11	(England)	Harrison Dunk	MF	1	1			2
12	(England)	Jacob Blyth	FW	1				1
12	(England)	Terry Kennedy	DF	1				1
12	(England)	Max Clark	MF	1				1
14	(England)	Josh Coulson	DF	1				1
15	(England)	Robbie Simpson	FW	1				1
16	(England)	James Dunne	MF	7				7
17	(England)	Liam Hughes	MF	2			1	3
18	(Northern Ireland)	Jeff Hughes	MF	1				1
21	(England)	Jimmy Spencer	FW	4				4
22	(England)	George Taft	DF	2				2
23	(England)	Ryan Ledson	MF	5	1			6
24	(England)	Conor Newton	MF	3				3
25	(England)	Darnell Furlong	DF	7				7
34	(England)	Ryan Haynes	DF	1				1
35	(England)	Will Norris	GK	2				2
Totals				62	6	0	1	69

=== Red cards ===
No.	Nat.	Player	Pos.	League Two	FA Cup	League Cup	Football League Trophy	Total
1	(England)	Chris Dunn	GK	1				1
5	(England)	Mark Roberts	DF	1				1
11	(England)	Harrison Dunk	MF	1				1
Totals				3	0	0	0	3

== Competitions ==
=== Pre-season friendlies ===
On 21 May 2015, Cambridge United announced they would face Coventry City in as part of their pre-season schedule. On 28 May 2015, Cambridge United announced their second pre-season friendly against Ipswich Town. On 8 June 2015, Norwich City was added to the pre-season fixture list. On 16 June 2015, a date for Chris Turner's memorial match was announced.

11 July 2015 Friendly	St Neots Town	2–7	Cambridge United	St Neots
15:00 BST	Gordon 45'; Vieira 47'	Report	Slew 39'; Hughes 56'; Craddock 79', 86', 89', 90'; Dunk 85'	Stadium: Rowley Park; Attendance: 702

14 July 2015 Friendly	Lowestoft Town	1–4	Cambridge United	Lowestoft
19:45 BST	Eagle 47'	Report	Corr 28'; Carr 31'; Coulson 84'; Craddock 87'	Stadium: Crown Meadow; Attendance: 312

17 July 2015 Friendly (120 mins)	Cambridge United	1–3	Norwich City	Cambridge
19:30 BST	Corr 34'	Report	Hooper 59' (pen.) van Wolfswinkel 62'; Toffolo 95'	Stadium: Abbey Stadium; Attendance: 3,890

21 July 2015 Friendly	Cambridge United	2–3	Ipswich Town	Cambridge
19:45 BST	Corr 39'; Berry 54'	Report	Maitland-Niles 3'; Pitman 29'; McGoldrick 61'	Stadium: Abbey Stadium; Attendance: 3,608

24 July 2015 Friendly	Concord Rangers	2–1	Cambridge United XI	Canvey Island
19:45 BST	Stokes 5'; Cawley 39'	Report	Chiedozie 18' (pen.)	Stadium: The Aspect Arena; Referee: Elliott Kaye

25 July 2015 Friendly	Bromley	1–1	Cambridge United	Bromley
15:00 BST	Wall 81' (pen.)	Report	Simpson 90+3'	Stadium: Bromley Arena, Hayes Lane

28 July 2015 Friendly	Cambridge United	1–0	Coventry City	Cambridge
19:45 BST	Legge 36'	Report		Stadium: Abbey Stadium; Attendance: 1,934; Referee: Fred Graham

1 August 2015 Chris Turner memorial match	Peterborough United	0–0	Cambridge United	Peterborough
15:00 BST		Report		Stadium: London Road

=== League Two ===
==== League table ====
Pos	Team	Pld	W	D	L	GF	GA	GD	Pts	Promotion, qualification or relegation
7	AFC Wimbledon (O, P)	46	21	12	13	64	50	+14	75	Qualification for League Two play-offs (Note: Four teams play for one spot and promotion to Football League One.)
8	Leyton Orient	46	19	12	15	60	61	−1	69	
9	Cambridge United	46	18	14	14	66	55	+11	68	
10	Carlisle United	46	17	16	13	67	62	+5	67	
11	Luton Town	46	19	9	18	63	61	+2	66	

Updated to match(es) played on 7 May 2016. Source: BBC Sport
Rules for classification: 1) Points; 2) Goal difference; 3) Number of goals scored
(O) Play-off winners; (P) Promoted

==== Results by matchday ====
Matchday	1	2	3	4	5	6	7	8	9	10	11	12	13	14	15	16	17	18	19	20	21	22	23	24	25	26	27	28	29	30	31	32	33	34	35	36	37	38	39	40	41	42	43	44	45	46
Ground	H	A	A	H	A	H	H	A	H	A	A	H	H	A	A	H	A	H	A	H	A	H	A	H	H	A	A	H	A	H	A	H	A	H	H	A	H	A	H	A	A	H	H	A	H	A
Result	W	D	W	L	D	L	D	D	W	L	D	L	W	L	W	L	L	L	W	W	W	D	W	W	L	L	D	D	W	W	L	W	L	W	L	D	W	L	D	D	W	D	W	W	D	D
Position	1	6	4	7	9	12	12	13	10	15	15	15	14	16	14	18	17	18	17	14	12	11	11	10	11	12	12	12	11	9	11	11	12	12	13	12	10	11	12	12	12	12	9	8	8	9

Updated to match(es) played on 7 May 2016. Source: BBC Sport
A = Away; H = Home; W = Win; D = Draw; L = Loss

==== Matches ====
On 17 June 2015, the fixtures for the forthcoming season were announced.

===== August =====
8 August 2015 1	Cambridge United	3–0	Newport County	Cambridge
15:00 BST	Corr 24', 65'; Dunk (yellow card) 71'; Simpson 80'	Report	Hayden (yellow card) 45+4'; Feely (yellow card) 55'	Stadium: Abbey Stadium; Attendance: 5,031 (away 331); Referee: Darren Handley

15 August 2015 2	Carlisle United	4–4	Cambridge United	Carlisle
15:00 BST	Héry (yellow card) 29'; Ibehre 42', 44', 76'; Grainger (yellow card) 45+4'; Wyke 50'	Report	Keane (yellow card) 2'; Corr 11', 45'; Taft 21'; Berry 58'	Stadium: Brunton Park; Attendance: 6,354 (away 278); Referee: Richard Clark

18 August 2015 3	AFC Wimbledon	1–2	Cambridge United	Kingston upon Thames
19:45 BST	Elliott 12'	Report	L.Hughes (yellow card) 45'; Legge 46'; Corr 48'	Stadium: Kingsmeadow; Attendance: 4,114 (away 640); Referee: Andy Woolmer

22 August 2015 4	Cambridge United	0–3	Crawley Town	Cambridge
15:00 BST	Taft (yellow card) 21'	Report	Young (yellow card) 27'; Deacon 39', 47'; Donnelly (yellow card) 46' (yellow-red card) 81'; Edwards 87'	Stadium: Abbey Stadium; Attendance: 5,459 (away 173); Referee: Nigel Miller

29 August 2015 5	Barnet	0–0	Cambridge United	Harrow
15:00 BST	Dembélé (yellow card) 73'	Report	Berry (yellow card) 90+1'	Stadium: The Hive Stadium; Attendance: 2,406 (away 762); Referee: Nick Kinseley

===== September =====
5 September 2015 6	Cambridge United	1–3	Luton Town	Cambridge
15:00 BST	Legge 28'; Dunk (yellow card) 42' (yellow-red card) 64'	Report	Lee (yellow card) 11'; Guttridge 21'; Wilkinson 66'; Green 84'	Stadium: Abbey Stadium; Attendance: 6,298 (away 1,425); Referee: Graham Salisbury

12 September 2015 7	Cambridge United	1–1	Leyton Orient	Cambridge
15:00 BST	Roberts (yellow card) 10'; Blyth 53' (yellow card) 56'; R.Simpson (yellow card) 84'	Report	J.Simpson 87'	Stadium: Abbey Stadium; Attendance: 5,821 (away 1,739); Referee: Oliver Langford

19 September 2015 8	Hartlepool United	0–0	Cambridge United	Hartlepool
15:00 BST		Report		Stadium: Victoria Park; Attendance: 3,665 (away 208); Referee: Geoff Eltringham

26 September 2015 9	Cambridge United	1–0	Stevenage	Cambridge
15:00 BST	Dunk 90+7'	Report	Hitchcock (yellow card) 59'; Lee (yellow card) 72'	Stadium: Abbey Stadium; Attendance: 4,582 (away 573); Referee: Ross Joyce

29 September 2015 10	Wycombe Wanderers	1–0	Cambridge United	High Wycombe
19:45 BST	Harriman 70'	Report	Dunn (red card) 53'; L.Hughes (yellow card) 87'	Stadium: Adams Park; Attendance: 3,152 (away 295); Referee: Stuart Attwell

===== October =====
3 October 2015 11	York City	2–2	Cambridge United	York
15:00 BST	Collins (yellow card) 44'; Coulson 50'; McCombe 54'	Report	Roberts 71' (yellow card) 90'; Corr 81'	Stadium: Bootham Crescent; Attendance: 2,987 (away 474); Referee: Ben Toner

10 October 2015 12	Cambridge United	1–3	Portsmouth	Cambridge
15:00 BST	Simpson 5'; Corr (yellow card) 11'; Roberts (red card) 45+3'; J.Hughes (yellow card) 80'	Report	Tubbs 67', 69', 87'; Davies (yellow card) 79'; Evans (red card) 90+5'	Stadium: Abbey Stadium; Attendance: 6,607 (away 1,866); Referee: Seb Stockbridge

17 October 2015 13	Cambridge United	2–1	Northampton Town	Cambridge
15:00 BST	Dunk 39'; Corr 50' (yellow card) 54'	Report	Richards 59' (pen.); O'Toole (yellow card) 69'; D'Ath (red card) 76'	Stadium: Abbey Stadium; Attendance: 5,459 (away 1,299); Referee: Darren England

21 October 2015 14	Exeter City	1–0	Cambridge United	Exeter
19:45 BST	Nichols 9'	Report	Taft (yellow card) 15'	Stadium: St James Park; Attendance: 2,883 (away 123); Referee: James Linington

24 October 2015 15	Yeovil Town	2–3	Cambridge United	Yeovil
15:00 BST	Laird (yellow card) 9'; Bird 44' (yellow card) 63'; Sheehan 79'; Sokolik (yellow card) 83'	Report	Gaffney 4', 26'; Berry 35'; Donaldson (yellow card) 77'	Stadium: Huish Park; Attendance: 3,224 (away 257); Referee: Chris Sarginson

30 October 2015 16	Cambridge United	1–2	Bristol Rovers	Cambridge
19:45GMT	Corr 33'	Report	Harrison 66'; Clarke (yellow card) 80'; M.Taylor 82'	Stadium: Abbey Stadium; Attendance: 5,115 (away 562); Referee: Brendan Malone

===== November =====
14 November 2015 17	Oxford United	1–0	Cambridge United	Oxford
15:00 GMT	Taylor (yellow card) 25' (goal) 32'; Lundstram (yellow card) 60'	Report	Legge (yellow card) 29'; Roberts (yellow card) 37'; Berry (yellow card) 79'; Slew (yellow card) 83'	Stadium: Kassam Stadium; Attendance: 6,958 (away 568); Referee: Keith Hill

21 November 2015 18	Cambridge United	2–3	Accrington Stanley	Cambridge
15:00 GMT	Corr 13'; Berry 37'; Kennedy (yellow card) 61'; Newton (yellow card) 76'	Report	McConville 29'; Crooks (yellow card) 38'; Davies 48' (yellow card) 68'; Pearson (yellow card) 52'; Windass 53' (pen.) (yellow card) 77'	Stadium: Abbey Stadium; Attendance: 5,107 (away 66); Referee: Iain Williamson

24 November 2015 19	Morecambe	2–4	Cambridge United	Morecambe
19:45 GMT	Molyneux 21'; Wilson (yellow card) 26'; Barkhuizen (yellow card) 55'; Murphy (yellow card) 60' (goal) 67'; Miller (yellow card) 62'; Edwards (yellow card) 73'	Report	Legge 12'; Donaldson 34'; Gayle 35'; Williamson 48'; Berry (yellow card) 65'; Ledson (yellow card) 79'	Stadium: Globe Arena; Attendance: 1,689 (away 167); Referee: Ben Toner

28 November 2015 20	Cambridge United	3–1	Notts County	Cambridge
15:00 GMT	Legge (yellow card) 44'; Corr 50' (pen.); Williamson 77'; Berry 87'	Report	Campbell 24' (yellow card) 84'; Hewitt (yellow card) 39'; Smith (yellow card) 50'; Sheehan (yellow card) 78'	Stadium: Abbey Stadium; Attendance: 4,596 (away 532); Referee: Charles Breakspear

===== December =====
12 December 2015 21	Plymouth Argyle	1–2	Cambridge United	Plymouth
15:00 GMT	Wylde 73'; Threlkeld (yellow card) 90+2'	Report	Williamson 6'; Corr (yellow card) 68'; Ledson (yellow card) 70'; Berry 86'	Stadium: Home Park; Attendance: 7,246 (away 164); Referee: Tim Robinson

19 December 2015 22	Cambridge United	1–1	Mansfield Town	Cambridge
15:00 GMT	Ledson (yellow card) 22'; Donaldson 36'	Report	Chapman 23'; Rose (yellow card) 33'; Green (yellow card) 90+3'	Stadium: Abbey Stadium; Attendance: 4,589 (away 297); Referee: Ross Joyce

26 December 2015 23	Dagenham & Redbridge	0–3	Cambridge United	Barking and Dagenham
13:00 GMT	Labadie (yellow card) 17'; Dunne (yellow card) 29'; Vassell (yellow card) 45'; Widdowson (yellow card) 82'; Dikamona (yellow card) 90+4'	Report	Newton (yellow card) 45+5'; Simpson 51', 65'; Berry (yellow card) 70'; Corr 76'	Stadium: Victoria Road; Attendance: 2,425 (away 929); Referee: Lee Collins

28 December 2015 24	Cambridge United	2–1	Barnet	Cambridge
15:00 GMT	Berry 71'; Corr 72'	Report	Akinde (yellow card) 9' (goal) 60'; Gash (yellow card) 73'	Stadium: Abbey Stadium; Attendance: 6,003 (away 549); Referee: David Webb

===== January =====
2 January 2016 25	Cambridge United	1–4	AFC Wimbledon	Cambridge
15:00 GMT	Berry 26'; Roberts (yellow card) 70'	Report	Robinson 10'; Taylor 64'; Meades 76'; Fuller (yellow card) 85'; Azeez 86'	Stadium: Abbey Stadium; Attendance: 5,754 (away 669); Referee: Tony Harrington

9 January 2016 26	Crawley Town	1–0	Cambridge United	Crawley
15:00 GMT	Bradley (yellow card) 10'; Harrold 36'	Report	Berry (yellow card) 28'; Newton (yellow card) 43'	Stadium: Broadfield Stadium; Attendance: 2,320 (away 501); Referee: Lee Swabey

16 January 2016 27	Luton Town	0–0	Cambridge United	Luton
15:00 GMT	Smith (yellow card) 45'; Marriott (yellow card) 54'; McQuoid (yellow card) 65'; Benson (yellow card) 74'; Lawless (yellow card) 80'	Report	Dunne (yellow card) 70'	Stadium: Kenilworth Road; Attendance: 9,227 (away 1,007); Referee: Andy Madley

23 January 2016 28	Cambridge United	1–1	Hartlepool United	Cambridge
15:00 GMT	Roberts (yellow card) 16'; Williamson 90'	Report	Jackson (yellow card) 45'; Richards (yellow card) 69'; Gray 71'	Stadium: Abbey Stadium; Attendance: 5,054 (away 186); Referee: Keith Hill

30 January 2016 29	Leyton Orient	1–3	Cambridge United	Waltham Forest
15:00 GMT	Baudry (yellow card) 48'; Gnanduillet 57'	Report	Williamson 10', 53'; Berry (yellow card) 29'; Spencer 63'; Dunne (yellow card) 78'	Stadium: Brisbane Road; Attendance: 6,526 (away 1,237); Referee: Michael Bull

===== February =====
6 February 2016 30	Cambridge United	1–0	Dagenham & Redbridge	Cambridge
15:00 GMT	Berry 82' (pen.)	Report	Widdowson (yellow card) 52'	Stadium: Abbey Stadium; Attendance: 4,494 (away 258); Referee: Carl Boyeson

13 February 2016 31	Stevenage	2–0	Cambridge United	Stevenage
15:00 GMT	Harrison 18', 63'; Wilkinson (yellow card) 29'; Lee (yellow card) 50'; Conlon (yellow card) 58'; Ogilvie (yellow card) 64'; Jones (yellow card) 89'	Report	Norris (yellow card) 64'; Furlong (yellow card) 86'	Stadium: Broadhall Way; Attendance: 3,945 (away 1,270); Referee: Chris Kavanagh

20 February 2016 32	Cambridge United	3–1	York City	Cambridge
15:00 GMT	Spencer 10'; Coulson 26'; Williamson 60'	Report	Berrett 33'; Šatka (yellow card) 68'	Stadium: Abbey Stadium; Attendance: 4,822 (away 424); Referee: Nick Kinseley

27 February 2016 33	Portsmouth	2–1	Cambridge United	Portsmouth
15:00 GMT	Davies (yellow card) 27'; McNulty 41' (yellow card) 90+5'; Webster 62'; Chaplin (yellow card) 87'	Report	Spencer (yellow card) 29'; Berry (yellow card) 70' (goal) 90'; Legge (yellow card) 79'	Stadium: Fratton Park; Attendance: 15,425 (away 587); Referee: Oliver Langford

===== March =====
1 March 2016 34	Cambridge United	1–0	Wycombe Wanderers	Cambridge
19:45 GMT	Stewart 27' (o.g.); Dunne (yellow card) 56'; Furlong (yellow card) 82'	Report	Bloomfield (yellow card) 42'	Stadium: Abbey Stadium; Attendance: 4,141 (away 325); Referee: Andy Davies

5 March 2016 35	Cambridge United	0–1	Exeter City	Cambridge
15:00 GMT		Report	Watkins 76' (yellow card) 76'	Stadium: Abbey Stadium; Attendance: 4,573 (away 273); Referee: Fred Graham

12 March 2016 36	Northampton Town	1–1	Cambridge United	Northampton
15:00 GMT	Collins (yellow card) 26'; Marquis 71'; Byrom (yellow card) 79'	Report	Haynes (yellow card) 11'; Spencer 90+1' (yellow card) 90+7'	Stadium: Sixfields Stadium; Attendance: 5,828 (away 901); Referee: Robert Lewis

19 March 2016 37	Cambridge United	3–0	Yeovil Town	Cambridge
15:00 GMT	Williamson 4', 45+2'; Dunne (yellow card) 48'; Coulson (yellow card) 60'; Furlong (yellow card) 81'; Spencer 87'	Report	Walsh (red card) 16'; Laird (yellow card) 27'; Tozer (yellow card) 29'; Dickson (yellow card) 58'	Stadium: Abbey Stadium; Attendance: 4,956 (away 265); Referee: Lee Swabey

25 March 2016 38	Bristol Rovers	3–0	Cambridge United	Bristol
15:00 GMT	Bodin 9', 18'; Taylor 73'	Report	Berry (yellow card) 46'; Spencer (yellow card) 50'; Furlong (yellow card) 85'	Stadium: Memorial Stadium; Attendance: 10,262 (away 443); Referee: Steve Martin

28 March 2016 39	Cambridge United	0–0	Oxford United	Cambridge
15:00 BST	Dunne (yellow card) 49'	Report	Skarz (yellow card) 38'; Maguire (yellow card) 62'; Wright (yellow card) 87'	Stadium: Abbey Stadium; Attendance: 6,108 (away 1,328); Referee: Mark Haywood

===== April =====
2 April 2016 40	Accrington Stanley	1–1	Cambridge United	Accrington
15:00 BST	Fosu-Henry 77'	Report	Spencer 55'	Stadium: Crown Ground; Attendance: 2,185 (away 257); Referee: Nigel Miller

9 April 2016 41	Newport County	0–1	Cambridge United	Newport
15:00 BST		Report	Clark (yellow card) 66'; Dunne 68'; Furlong (yellow card) 85'	Stadium: Rodney Parade; Attendance: 2,330 (away 185); Referee: Darren England

16 April 2016 42	Cambridge United	0–0	Carlisle United	Cambridge
15:00 BST	Legge (yellow card) 15'; Furlong (yellow card) 73'	Report	Wyke (yellow card) 8'; Hope (red card) 23'; Grainger (yellow card) 69'; Miller (yellow card) 72'; Ellis (yellow card) 83' (red card) 90+4'	Stadium: Abbey Stadium; Attendance: 5,806 (away 403); Referee: Ben Toner

19 April 2016 43	Cambridge United	7–0	Morecambe	Cambridge
19:45 BST	Berry 6' (pen.), 90+3' (pen.); Dunk 17', 26'; Williamson 29'; Roberts 45+1'; Ismail 59'	Report	Conlan (yellow card) 31'; Edwards (yellow card) 90'	Stadium: Abbey Stadium; Attendance: 3,941 (away 46); Referee: James Adcock

23 April 2016 44	Notts County	1–2	Cambridge United	Nottingham
15:00 BST	Atkinson (yellow card) 13'; Hollis 39'; Smith (yellow card) 51'; Hewitt (yellow card) 73'; Noble (red card) 81'	Report	Berry 4'; Williamson 54'; Furlong (yellow card) 65'; Dunne (yellow card) 75'; Spencer (yellow card) 90+4'	Stadium: Meadow Lane; Attendance: 4,450 (away 702); Referee: Ross Joyce

30 April 2016 45	Cambridge United	2–2	Plymouth Argyle	Cambridge
15:00 BST	Ledson (yellow card) 82'; Williamson 84'; Spencer 86'; Norris (yellow card) 90'	Report	McHugh (yellow card) 7'; Boateng (yellow card) 60'; Matt 71'; Tanner (yellow card) 82'; Carey 90+2'	Stadium: Abbey Stadium; Attendance: 6,714 (away 1,567); Referee: Trevor Kettle

===== May =====
7 May 2016 46	Mansfield Town	0–0	Cambridge United	Mansfield
15:00 BST		Report	Ledson (yellow card) 25'; Dunne (yellow card) 74'	Stadium: Field Mill; Attendance: 3,548 (away 564); Referee: Eddie Ilderton

=== FA Cup ===
On 26 October 2015 the draw for the first round of the FA Cup was drawn and Cambridge United host National League South side Basingstoke Town.

7 November 2015 First round	Cambridge United	1–0	Basingstoke Town	Cambridge
15:00 GMT	J.Hughes 19'; Berry (yellow card) 45'; Taylor (yellow card) 82'	Report		Stadium: Abbey Stadium; Attendance: 2,974 (away 266); Referee: John Brooks

6 December 2015 Second round	Cambridge United	1–3	Doncaster Rovers	Cambridge
14:00 GMT	Berry 23'; Ledson (yellow card) 25'; Dunk (yellow card) 40'; Roberts (yellow card) 74'; Corr (yellow card) 83'	Report	Coppinger (yellow card) 26'; Grant 46', 57'; Lund 56'	Stadium: Abbey Stadium; Attendance: 3,951 (away 672); Referee: Mark Brown

=== League Cup ===
On 16 June 2015, the first round draw was made, Cambridge United were drawn away against Rotherham United.

11 August 2015 First round	Rotherham United	1–0	Cambridge United	Rotherham
19:45 BST	Bowery 45+1'; Smallwood (yellow card) 55'			Stadium: AESSEAL New York Stadium; Attendance: 4,568 (away 408); Referee: Chris Sarginson

=== Football League Trophy ===
On 8 August 2015, live on Soccer AM the draw for the first round of the Football League Trophy was drawn by Toni Duggan and Alex Scott. U's host Dagenham & Redbridge.

1 September 2015 First round	Cambridge United	0–2	Dagenham & Redbridge	Cambridge
19:45 BST	L.Hughes (yellow card) 81'		Hemmings 20'; McClure 27'; Chambers (yellow card)	Stadium: Abbey Stadium; Attendance: 1,618; Referee: Darren Drysdale
