= Harrison Dunk =

English footballer

Personal information
- Full name: Harrison Charles Dunk
- Date of birth: 25 October 1990 (age 36)
- Place of birth: Hammersmith, England
- Height: 6 ft 0 in (1.84 m)
- Positions: Left back; left midfielder

Youth career
- AFC Wimbledon

Senior career*
Years	Team	Apps	(Gls)
2009–2011	Bromley	68	(7)
2011–2024	Cambridge United	396	(25)
- * Club domestic league appearances and goals as of 15:55, 1 May 2024 (UTC)

Harrison Charles Dunk (born 25 October 1990) is an English former professional footballer who plays as a left back or left midfielder. He last played for EFL League One club Cambridge United.

== Career ==
Dunk was born in Hammersmith, Greater London. He joined Bromley on 7 August 2009, after being spotted in an under-18 tournament in Germany, following time with AFC Wimbledon. He featured regularly for the club in his debut campaign, and was also selected the club's Player of the Season.

On 7 June 2011, after picking up another Player of the Season award with Bromley, Dunk joined Cambridge United. He renewed his link with the U's on 23 March 2014.

On 9 August 2014, Dunk played his first match in the Football League, starting in a 1–0 home win against Plymouth Argyle. On 8 January 2018, Dunk became Cambridge United's longest serving player after defender Josh Coulson left the club for Leyton Orient. Dunk made his 300th appearance for Cambridge on 13 August 2019 in a League Cup first round tie against Brentford in which Cambridge won on penalties. He made his 300th league appearance against Scunthorpe on 17 October 2020 with United winning 5–0.

On 1 May 2024, the club announced Dunk would be released in the summer at the end of his contract.

Dunk has now retired from professional football. In September 2024, he took up a role with the Professional Footballers' Association's legal team. He ended his career as Cambridge United's fifth all-time appearance maker.

== Career statistics ==
As of match played 22 April 2024

Appearances and goals by club, season and competition
Club	Season	League			FA Cup		League Cup		Other		Total	
Club	Season	Division	Apps	Goals	Apps	Goals	Apps	Goals	Apps	Goals	Apps	Goals
Bromley	2009–10	Conference South	34	2			—				34	2
Bromley	2010–11	Conference South	34	5	2	0	—		4 (Note: One appearance in FA Trophy, three appearances and one goal in Kent Senior Cup)	1	40	6
Bromley	Total		68	7	2	0	—		4	1	74	8
Cambridge United	2011–12	Conference Premier	23	6	3	1	—		4 (Note: Appearances in FA Trophy)	0	30	7
Cambridge United	2012–13	Conference Premier	32	2	0	0	—		2	0	34	2
Cambridge United	2013–14	Conference Premier	30	3	4	0	—		4 (Note: One appearance in FA Trophy, three in Conference Premier play-offs)	0	38	3
Cambridge United	2014–15	League Two	32	2	3	0	1	0	0	0	36	2
Cambridge United	2015–16	League Two	45	4	2	0	1	0	0	0	48	4
Cambridge United	2016–17	League Two	38	2	4	0	0	0	1 (Note: Appearance(s) in EFL Trophy)	0	43	2
Cambridge United	2017–18	League Two	37	2	2	0	1	0	2	0	42	2
Cambridge United	2018–19	League Two	26	0	0	0	0	0	2	0	28	0
Cambridge United	2019–20	League Two	29	0	2	0	2	0	3	0	36	0
Cambridge United	2020–21	League Two	41	0	1	0	2	0	5	0	47	0
Cambridge United	2021–22	League One	34	1	4	0	1	0	6	0	44	1
Cambridge United	2022–23	League One	25	3	2	0	0	0	0	0	27	3
Cambridge United	2023–24	League One	4	0	0	0	1	0	1	0	6	0
Cambridge United	Total		396	25	27	1	9	0	30	0	462	26
Career total			464	32	29	1	9	0	34	1	536	34

== Honours ==
Cambridge United

- EFL League Two second-place promotion: 2020–21
- Conference Premier play-offs: 2014
- FA Trophy: 2013–14

Individual

- Bromley Player of the Season: 2009–10, 2010–11
