= Jordan Chiedozie =

English footballer

Personal information
- Date of birth: 1 August 1994 (age 32)
- Place of birth: Bournemouth, England
- Position: Forward

Youth career
- 2007–2012: Bournemouth

Senior career*
Years	Team	Apps	(Gls)
2012–2014	AFC Bournemouth	0	(0)
2012	→ Dorchester Town (loan)	2	(0)
2013	→ AFC Totton (loan)	3	(1)
2013	→ Poole Town (loan)	1	(0)
2014	→ Poole Town (loan)	6	(3)
2014	Poole Town	10	(1)
2014	Concord Rangers	12	(6)
2014–2015	Cambridge United	8	(0)
2015	→ Dartford (loan)	4	(2)
2015	→ Braintree Town (loan)	5	(1)
2015	Boreham Wood	5	(0)
2016–2017	Concord Rangers	25	(12)
2017–2018	Margate	39	(29)
2018–2019	Chelmsford City	8	(0)
2019	Bishop's Stortford	4	(1)
2019–2020	Braintree Town	19	(3)
2021	Ramsgate	11	(5)
2022	Ramsgate	2	(1)
2023	AFC Totton	17	(1)
2024	Poole Town	1	(0)
2024–2025	Bashley	4	(0)
Total		186	(66)
- * Club domestic league appearances and goals

Jordan Joshua M. Chiedozie (born 1 August 1994) is an English former footballer who last played as a forward.

== Career ==
Born in Bournemouth, Chiedozie joined Bournemouth's youth system in 2007, aged 13. On 26 October 2012 he joined Dorchester Town in a one-month loan deal.

Chiedozie only appeared in two league matches before returning to the Cherries. On 11 January 2013 he was loaned to Totton, also in a month's deal. Chiedozie made an instant impact at the club, scoring one and assisting the other three goals in a 4–0 home routing over Kettering Town, being also named man of the match. However, he picked up a knee injury in his 3rd game that ruled him out for the rest of his loan spell.

Chiedozie moved to Poole Town in another month's loan on 25 October 2013. However, he only appeared in two FA Cup matches before returning to Bournemouth. On 10 January of the following year he rejoined Poole, and appeared more regularly.

In February 2014 Chiedozie was released by the Cherries, and joined Poole permanently shortly after.

On 7 August 2014 Chiedozie signed with Concord Rangers. After scoring seven goals in only 14 matches, he signed an 18-month deal with League Two side Cambridge United on 28 November. He made his professional debut a day later, starting in a 2–1 away win against AFC Wimbledon. In March 2015, he joined Conference Premier strugglers Dartford on loan until the end of the season.

In December 2015 Chiedozie's contract with Cambridge United was terminated by mutual consent.

As of 2016, Chiedozie signed for Boreham Wood.

On 22 September 2016, Concord Rangers announced the re-signing of Chiedozie, following his release from Boreham Wood.

On 21 July 2018, after a prolific spell at Margate, Chiedozie signed for Chelmsford City. On 9 May 2019, following a number of injuries throughout the season, Chiedozie was released by Chelmsford. In October 2019, Chiedozie signed for Isthmian League club Bishop's Stortford, scoring on his debut on 12 October 2019 in a 2–0 win against Horsham.

Prior to the 2021–22 season, Chiedozie returned to Kent to join Ramsgate. Despite netting ten times in his first three months back with the Kent-based side, Chiedozie fell out of favour and was ultimately released in November 2021. He then subsequently returned to Ramsgate on a second occasion in August 2022, this time featuring twice before leaving once again that month.

== Personal life ==
Chiedozie's father, John, was also a footballer. A winger, he was born in Nigeria but spent his whole career in England.He played for Nigeria National team in the 1980 Africa Cup of Nations.

In February 2025, it was revealed that Chiedozie was in a coma after a serious crash on the M27.

He recovered from the artificial coma but then made it clear that "my football career is over and my life has changed forever". Chiedozie appeared in BBC news items in July 2025 where it was revealed that his injuries in the car crash had led to the amputation of his right leg and very serious damage to his left.

== Career statistics ==
As of match played 16 August 2022

Appearances and goals by club, season and competition
Club	Season	League			FA Cup		League Cup		Other		Total	
Club	Season	Division	Apps	Goals	Apps	Goals	Apps	Goals	Apps	Goals	Apps	Goals
AFC Bournemouth	2012–13	League One	0	0	0	0	0	0	0	0	0	0
AFC Bournemouth	2013–14	Championship	0	0	0	0	0	0	—		0	0
AFC Bournemouth	Total		0	0	0	0	0	0	0	0	0	0
Dorchester Town (loan)	2012–13	Conference South	2	0	0	0	—		0	0	2	0
AFC Totton (loan)	2012–13	Southern League Premier Division	3	1	0	0	—		0	0	3	1
Poole Town (loan)	2013–14	Southern League Premier Division	7	3	2	0	—		0	0	9	3
Poole Town	2013–14	Southern League Premier Division	10	1	—		—		0	0	10	1
Concord Rangers	2014–15	Conference South	12	6	2	1	—		0	0	14	7
Cambridge United	2014–15	League Two	6	0	—		—		—		6	0
Cambridge United	2015–16	League Two	2	0	0	0	0	0	0	0	2	0
Cambridge United	Total		8	0	0	0	0	0	0	0	8	0
Dartford (loan)	2014–15	Conference Premier	4	2	—		—		—		4	2
Braintree Town (loan)	2015–16	National League	5	1	0	0	—		0	0	5	1
Boreham Wood	2015–16	National League	1	0	—		—		—		1	0
Boreham Wood	2016–17	National League	4	0	0	0	—		0	0	4	0
Boreham Wood	Total		5	0	0	0	—		0	0	5	0
Concord Rangers	2016–17	National League South	25	12	—		—		0	0	25	12
Margate	2017–18	Isthmian League Premier Division	39	29	3	4	—		4 (Note: Appearances in the FA Trophy)	1	46	34
Chelmsford City	2018–19	National League South	8	0	1	0	—		0	0	9	0
Bishop's Stortford	2019–20	Isthmian League Premier Division	4	1	0	0	—		2	1	6	2
Braintree Town	2019–20	National League South	15	2	—		—		—		15	2
Braintree Town	2020–21	National League South	4	1	0	0	—		0	0	4	1
Braintree Town	Total		19	3	0	0	—		0	0	19	3
Ramsgate	2021–22	Isthmian South East Division	11	5	2	1	—		2	4	15	10
Ramsgate	2022–23	Isthmian South East Division	2	1	0	0	—		0	0	2	1
Ramsgate	Total		13	6	2	1	—		2	4	17	11
Career total			164	65	10	6	0	0	8	6	182	77
