= Adam Cunnington =

English footballer

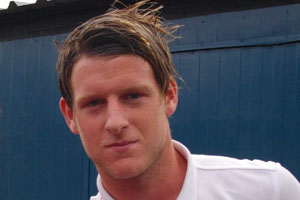
- Cunnington in 2012

Personal information
- Full name: Adam Paul Cunnington
- Date of birth: 7 October 1987 (age 39)
- Place of birth: Leighton Buzzard, England
- Height: 6 ft 3 in (1.91 m)
- Position: Striker

Senior career*
Years	Team	Apps	(Gls)
2006	Barton Rovers	13	(5)
2006–2007	Leighton Town	12	(3)
2007	Hitchin Town	2	(0)
2007	Rothwell Town	1	(0)
2007–2008	Aylesbury United	2	(0)
2008	Stamford		
2008–2010	Barwell	40	(36)
2010–2011	Solihull Moors	22	(10)
2011–2012	Kettering Town	26	(6)
2011–2012	→ Dagenham & Redbridge (loan)	4	(0)
2012	Dagenham & Redbridge	5	(0)
2012	→ Alfreton Town (loan)	11	(2)
2012–2013	Tamworth	45	(21)
2013–2015	Cambridge United	31	(10)
2014	→ Bristol Rovers (loan)	15	(3)
2015	Ebbsfleet United	26	(9)
2015	→ Woking (loan)	3	(0)
2015–2017	Bromley	41	(8)
2017–2019	Billericay Town	37	(23)
2019	Dartford	11	(1)
2019	Hemel Hempstead Town	4	(0)
2019–2020	Romford	3	(0)
2020	Hornchurch	10	(4)
2020	Cheshunt	8	(1)
2020–????	Enfield Town	0	(0)
- * Club domestic league appearances and goals

Adam Paul Cunnington (born 7 October 1987) is an English footballer who plays as a striker for Bedford Town.

== Career ==
Born in Leighton Buzzard, Bedfordshire, Cunnington started his career with Barton Rovers during the 2005–06 season, in which he scored three goals in 22 appearances. He started the 2006–07 season with five goals in 13 appearances for Barton, before moving to Leighton Town. After scoring three goals in 13 appearances for Leighton he finished the season with Hitchin Town. Having made three appearances for Hitchin in the 2007–08 season he signed for Aylesbury United in September 2007. After making four appearances for the club he returned to former club Barton Rovers, before going on to finish the season with Rothwell Town, making one appearance for the club. Cunnington started the 2008–09 season with Stamford, before joining Barwell later that season. With Barwell in the 2009–10 season, he struck up a strike partnership with Kevin Charley that saw the pair score more than 50 goals, helping the club win the Midland Football Alliance title and reach the FA Vase semi-final.

Cunnington joined Conference North side Solihull Moors in July 2010, and having scored 10 goals in 22 appearances for the club he signed for Conference National side Kettering Town for an undisclosed fee on 1 February 2011, transfer deadline day. He made his Kettering debut on 26 February, starting the team's 2–0 victory at home over Newport County. He only managed his first Kettering goal in the side's last game of the 2010–11 season, a 3–1 home victory over Southport on 30 April. He finished the season with 14 appearances for Kettering.

Having started the 2011–12 season with five goals in 13 appearances, Cunnington joined League Two club Dagenham & Redbridge on loan on 24 November with a view to a permanent transfer. His debut came two days later after starting a 3–0 defeat away at Accrington Stanley. After making four appearances for Dagenham he permanently moved to the club upon the loan's expiration on 4 January 2012, signing a two-and-a-half-year contract. He joined Conference side Alfreton Town on a one-month loan on 9 March.

For the 2012–13 season, Cunnington signed for Conference outfit Tamworth. He enjoyed a successful season, ending up as the Conference second top-scorer with 21 goals. Cunnington signed for Conference rivals Cambridge United on a two-year contract on 10 May 2013, becoming the club's fifth signing in a week. and was part of the team that won promotion to League Two via the play-offs.

He featured in Cambridge's first three games of the 2014–15 season but the arrival of Jayden Stockley on loan AFC Bournemouth saw him drop down the pecking order and he was loaned out to Conference Premier side Bristol Rovers on 22 August.

After a spell at Ebbsfleet United, and a short loan at Woking, Cunnington signed for Bromley.

Cunnington then spent two years with Billericay Town before signing for Dartford on 2 August 2019. On 8 October 2019, Dartford announced that Cunnington had left the club by mutual consent.

On 9 October 2019, Cunnington joined Hemel Hempstead Town.

On 21 November 2019, Cunnington joined his third team of the 2019/20 season when he linked up with Romford. He left the club in January 2020. and joined Hornchurch.

At the beginning of the 2020/2021 season, Cunnington joined Isthmian Premier League side Cheshunt. He scored his first goals for the club in a 3–1 victory away to Long Melford in an FA Cup First Qualifying Round tie, scoring 2.

On 6 November 2020. Cunnington signed for Cheshunt's fiercest rivals, Enfield Town.

== Career statistics ==
As of match played 18 March 2017.

Appearances and goals by club, season and competition
Club	Season	League			FA Cup		League Cup		Other		Total	
Club	Season	Division	Apps	Goals	Apps	Goals	Apps	Goals	Apps	Goals	Apps	Goals
Barton Rovers	2006–07	Southern League Division One Midlands	13	5	0	0	—		0	0	13	5
Leighton Town	2006–07	Southern League Division One Midlands	12	3	1	0	—		0	0	13	3
Hitchin Town	2007–08	Southern League Premier Division	2	0	0	0	—		0	0	2	0
Rothwell Town	2007–08	Southern League Division One Midlands	1	0	0	0	—		0	0	1	0
Aylesbury United	2007–08	Southern League Division One Midlands	2	0	1	0	—		0	0	3	0
Solihull Moors	2010–11	Conference North	22	10	0	0	—		0	0	22	10
Kettering Town	2010–11	Conference Premier	14	1	0	0	—		0	0	14	1
Kettering Town	2011–12	Conference Premier	12	5	0	0	—		1 (Note: Appearance(s) in FA Trophy)	0	13	5
Kettering Town	Total		26	6	0	0	—		1	0	27	6
Dagenham & Redbridge (loan)	2011–12	League Two	4	0	0	0	0	0	0	0	4	0
Dagenham & Redbridge	2011–12	League Two	5	0	0	0	0	0	0	0	5	0
Alfreton Town (loan)	2011–12	Conference Premier	11	2	0	0	—		0	0	11	2
Tamworth	2012–13	Conference Premier	45	21	1	0	—		4	0	50	21
Cambridge United	2013–14	Conference Premier	24	8	4	1	—		2 (Note: Appearance(s) in Conference Premier play-offs)	0	30	9
Cambridge United	2014–15	League Two	7	2	—		1	0	0	0	8	2
Cambridge United	Total		31	10	4	1	1	0	2	0	38	11
Bristol Rovers (loan)	2014–15	Conference Premier	15	3	1	0	—		0	0	16	3
Ebbsfleet United	2014–15	Conference South	16	9	—		—		3	2	19	11
Ebbsfleet United	2015–16	National League South	10	0	2	0	—		0	0	12	0
Ebbsfleet United	Total		26	9	2	0	—		3	2	31	11
Woking (loan)	2015–16	National League	3	0	—		—		0	0	3	0
Bromley	2015–16	National League	20	5	—		—		1	0	21	5
Bromley	2016–17	National League	21	3	1	0	—		3	3	25	6
Bromley	Total		41	8	1	0	—		4	3	46	11
Billericay Town	2016–17	Isthmian League Premier Division	14	6	—		—		2	1	16	7
Career total			186	28	7	0	0	0	13	3	206	31
