= Gearóid Morrissey =

Irish footballer (born 1991)

Personal information
- Date of birth: 17 November 1991 (age 34)
- Place of birth: Cork, Ireland
- Height: 1.83 m (6 ft 0 in)
- Position: Midfielder

Youth career
- Ringmahon Rangers
- 2008–2010: Blackburn Rovers

Senior career*
Years	Team	Apps	(Gls)
2010–2014	Cork City	131	(10)
2015	Cambridge United	10	(0)
2016–2021	Cork City	126	(17)

International career^{‡}
2007–2008	Republic of Ireland U17	5	(0)
2009–2010	Republic of Ireland U19	8	(0)
- * Club domestic league appearances and goals as of 22:02, 2 December 2021 (UTC) ‡ National team caps and goals as of 10 September 2012

Gearóid Morrissey (born 17 November 1991) is an Irish former professional footballer who played as a central midfielder for Cork City over two spells, with a brief stint in between at Cambridge United, where he made his debut against Manchester United.

== Club career ==
Morrissey joined Blackburn Rovers' youth setup in 2008, aged 16, after playing for local side Ringmahon Rangers. He returned to Ireland two years later, and signed for Cork City.

Morrissey made his debut on 29 May 2010, coming on as a late substitute in a 0–1 home loss against Athlone Town for the First Division championship. He achieved promotion to the Premier Division in 2011, appearing regularly, and was an ever-present figure for the club in the following campaigns.

On 22 December 2014, Morrissey moved to League Two's Cambridge United. He made his U's debut on 3 February 2015, replacing Luke Chadwick in the 51st minute of a FA Cup 0–3 loss against Manchester United at Old Trafford.

It was announced he had re-signed for home club Cork City on 10 December 2015, ahead of the 2016 season.

Morrissey announced his retirement from professional football on 2 December 2021 after 335 professional appearances, scoring 30 goals.

== International career ==
Morrissey represented Republic of Ireland in the under-17 and under-19 levels.

== Career statistics ==
Professional appearances – correct as of 2 December 2021.

Club	Season	League			National Cup		League Cup		Europe		Other		Total	
Club	Season	Division	Apps	Goals	Apps	Goals	Apps	Goals	Apps	Goals	Apps	Goals	Apps	Goals
Cork City	2010	LOI First Division	17	0	3	0	0	0	—		0 (Note: Appearances in Munster Senior Cup)	0	20	0
Cork City	2011	LOI First Division	29	5	3	0	3	0	—		1	0	36	5
Cork City	2012	LOI Premier Division	27	1	2	0	1	0	—		0	0	30	1
Cork City	2013	LOI Premier Division	32	2	1	0	0	0	—		5 (Note: Appearances in Setanta Sports Cup)	1	38	3
Cork City	2014	LOI Premier Division	26	2	3	0	1	0	—		0	0	30	2
Cambridge United	2014–15	EFL League Two	8	0	1	0	0	0	—		0 (Note: Appearances in EFL Trophy)	0	9	0
Cambridge United	2015–16	EFL League Two	2	0	0	0	0	0	—		1	0	3	0
Cambridge United	Cambridge United Total		10	0	1	0	0	0	—		1	0	12	0
Cork City	2016	LOI Premier Division	24	2	4	0	1	1	6 (Note: Appearances in UEFA Europa League)	0	1 (Note: Appearances in President's Cup)	0	36	3
Cork City	2017	LOI Premier Division	27	6	4	0	2	0	4	0	2 (Note: 1 appearance in President's Cup & 1 appearance in Munster Senior Cup)	0	39	6
Cork City	2018	LOI Premier Division	24	4	6	1	0	0	3 (Note: 1 appearance in UEFA Champions League & 2 appearances in UEFA Europa League)	0	2 (Note: 1 appearance in President's Cup & 1 appearance in Munster Senior Cup)	0	35	5
Cork City	2019	LOI Premier Division	23	3	2	0	1	0	2	0	2 (Note: 1 appearance in President's Cup & 1 appearance in Munster Senior Cup)	0	30	3
Cork City	2020	LOI Premier Division	14	1	1	1	—		—		0	0	15	2
Cork City	2021	LOI First Division	14	0	0	0	—		—		—		14	0
Cork City	Cork City Total		257	26	29	2	9	1	15	0	13	1	323	30
Career Total			267	26	29	1	9	1	15	0	14	1	335	30
