= Liam Hughes (footballer, born 1992) =

English footballer (born 1992)

Personal information
- Full name: Liam Michael Hughes
- Date of birth: 10 August 1992 (age 34)
- Place of birth: Rotherham, England
- Height: 6 ft 4 in (1.93 m)
- Positions: Attacking midfielder; striker

Team information
- Current team: Cleethorpes Town

Youth career
- Scunthorpe United
- 2007–2011: Cambridge United

Senior career*
| Years | Team | Apps | (Gls) |
| 2010–2016 | Cambridge United | 161 | (13) |
| 2012 | → Corby Town (loan) | 3 | (3) |
| 2016 | Inverness Caledonian Thistle | 9 | (0) |
| 2016–2017 | Barrow | 47 | (5) |
| 2017–2018 | Guiseley | 5 | (0) |
| 2018 | Billericay Town | 13 | (1) |
| 2018–2019 | Darlington | 22 | (1) |
| 2019 | Gainsborough Trinity | 4 | (0) |
| 2019 | Stratford Town | 5 | (0) |
| 2019–2020 | Bradford Park Avenue | 17 | (2) |
| 2020 | → Frickley Athletic (dual reg.) | 4 | (0) |
| 2020–2022 | Matlock Town | 38 | (13) |
| 2021 | → Kettering Town (loan) | 1 | (0) |
| 2022–2026 | Worksop Town | 142 | (97) |
| 2026– | Cleethorpes Town | | |
- * Club domestic league appearances and goals as of 14:47, 27 February 2025 (UTC)

Liam Michael Hughes (born 10 August 1992) is an English footballer who plays as an attacking midfielder or striker for Cleethorpes Town. He previously played for Cambridge United in the Football League and for Inverness Caledonian Thistle in the Scottish Premiership, as well as for several non-league teams.

== Club career ==
Born in Rotherham, Hughes joined Cambridge United's youth setup from Scunthorpe United in 2007, aged 15. Initially a defender, he was converted to a more attacking role during his time at the Academy, and made his first-team debut on 9 November 2010, coming on as a late substitute in a 1–1 draw at home to Grimsby Town.

On 4 April 2011 Hughes signed a two-year professional deal with Cambridge United, but struggled to appear regularly as a starter. On 21 November 2012 he was loaned to Corby Town for a month, and after scoring six goals in five matches he returned to Cambridge.

Hughes signed a new two-and-a-half-year contract with the club on 30 January 2014. He was a member of the starting eleven for the 2014 FA Trophy Final as Cambridge beat Gosport Borough 4–0, and his headed goal opened the scoring in that season's play-off final in which Cambridge beat Gateshead 2–1 to gain promotion to the Football League. He played his first Football League match on 16 August, starting in a 2–1 loss away to Portsmouth. His contract with Cambridge United was cancelled by mutual consent on 30 January 2016, and Hughes signed for Inverness Caledonian Thistle of the Scottish Premiership two days later.

In June 2016 he joined Barrow. He moved on to Guiseley in November 2017, before signing for Billericay Town in February 2018.

On 16 May 2018 he joined Darlington. He left by mutual consent on 7 March 2019 and signed for Gainsborough Trinity the same day.

Hughes left Gainsborough in July 2019 and signed for Stratford Town, once again linking up with Darlington manager Tommy Wright. He left Stratford in October and signed for Bradford Park Avenue; he made his debut on 12 October in a 3–2 defeat at home to Hereford. In February 2020, he joined Frickley Athletic on dual registration.

Hughes signed for Matlock Town ahead of the 2020–21 season, and spent two years with the club, less a month on loan at Kettering Town while the Northern Premier League was under lockdown in early 2021.

He then moved on to Worksop Town for the 2022-23 season. In Hughes' first season at the club he finished as top scorer with 42 goals in 45 appearances, helping Worksop win the NPL East Division title. He was named in both the East Division and Media-voted Teams of the Season and won the East Division Player of the Season and the Supporters' Player of the Season.

== Personal life ==
In an interview with BBC Sport, Hughes revealed his struggles with drug addictions, self-harm and an attempted suicide during his career. Hughes was attacked and robbed of £350 on 25 December 2018, the day before he played for Darlington and scored in a 5–1 win over York City. Hughes is a father to three daughters from a previous relationship, and will marry his new partner in July 2024.

== Career statistics ==
As of match played 22 February 2025

| Club | Season | League | | | National cup (Note: Includes FA Cup, Scottish Cup) | | League cup (Note: Includes Football League Cup, Alan Turvey Trophy, Southern League Cup) | | Other | | Total | |
| Club | Season | Division | Apps | Goals | Apps | Goals | Apps | Goals | Apps | Goals | Apps | Goals |
|---|---|---|---|---|---|---|---|---|---|---|---|---|
| Cambridge United | 2010–11 | Conference Premier | 18 | 2 | 0 | 0 | — | | 0 | 0 | 18 | 2 |
| Cambridge United | 2011–12 | Conference Premier | 21 | 2 | 1 | 0 | — | | 4 (Note: Appearance(s) in FA Trophy) | 0 | 26 | 2 |
| Cambridge United | 2012–13 | Conference Premier | 36 | 4 | 0 | 0 | — | | 0 | 0 | 36 | 4 |
| Cambridge United | 2013–14 | Conference Premier | 40 | 2 | 4 | 0 | — | | 11 (Note: Eight appearances in FA Trophy, three in Conference Premier play-offs) | 1 | 55 | 3 |
| Cambridge United | 2014–15 | League Two | 30 | 3 | 5 | 0 | 1 | 0 | 1 (Note: Appearance(s) in Football League Trophy) | 0 | 37 | 3 |
| Cambridge United | 2015–16 | League Two | 16 | 0 | 1 | 0 | 0 | 0 | 1 | 0 | 18 | 0 |
| Cambridge United | Total | | 161 | 13 | 11 | 0 | 1 | 0 | 17 | 1 | 190 | 14 |
| Corby Town (loan) | 2012–13 | Conference North | 3 | 3 | 0 | 0 | — | | 3 | 2 | 6 | 5 |
| Inverness Caledonian Thistle | 2015–16 | Scottish Premiership | 9 | 0 | 2 | 0 | 0 | 0 | 0 | 0 | 11 | 0 |
| Barrow | 2016–17 | National League | 38 | 5 | 4 | 0 | — | | 3 | 0 | 45 | 5 |
| Barrow | 2017–18 | National League | 9 | 0 | 0 | 0 | — | | 0 | 0 | 9 | 0 |
| Barrow | Total | | 47 | 5 | 4 | 0 | — | | 3 | 0 | 54 | 5 |
| Guiseley | 2017–18 | National League | 5 | 0 | 1 | 0 | — | | 0 | 0 | 6 | 0 |
| Billericay Town | 2017–18 | Isthmian League Premier Division | 13 | 1 | 0 | 0 | 2 | 1 | — | | 15 | 2 |
| Darlington | 2018–19 | National League North | 22 | 1 | 1 | 0 | — | | 1 | 0 | 24 | 1 |
| Gainsborough Trinity | 2018–19 | Northern Premier League (NPL); Premier Division | 4 | 0 | — | | — | | — | | 4 | 0 |
| Stratford Town | 2019–20 | Southern League (SFL); Premier Division Central | 5 | 0 | 1 | 1 | 1 | 0 | — | | 7 | 1 |
| Bradford Park Avenue | 2019–20 | National League North | 17 | 2 | — | | — | | 2 | 0 | 19 | 2 |
| Frickley Athletic | 2019–20 | NPL Division One South East | 4 | 0 | — | | — | | — | | 4 | 0 |
| Matlock Town | 2020–21 | NPL Premier Division | 5 | 3 | 3 | 1 | — | | 0 | 0 | 8 | 4 |
| Matlock Town | 2021–22 | NPL Premier Division | 33 | 10 | 1 | 0 | — | | 4 (Note: Three appearances and one goal in FA Trophy, one appearance and one goal in Northern Premier League play-offs) | 2 | 38 | 12 |
| Matlock Town | Total | | 38 | 13 | 4 | 1 | — | | 4 | 2 | 46 | 16 |
| Kettering Town (loan) | 2020–21 | National League North | 1 | 0 | — | | — | | 1 | 0 | 2 | 0 |
| Worksop Town | 2022–23 | NPL East Division | 35 | 33 | 5 | 4 | — | | 5 (Note: Four appearances and four goals in FA Trophy, one appearance and one goal in Sheffield & Hallamshire Senior Cup) | 5 | 45 | 42 |
| Worksop Town | 2023–24 | NPL Premier Division | 25 | 10 | 6 | 7 | — | | 2 (Note: One appearance in FA Trophy, one appearance in play-offs, two appearances and three goals in Sheffield & Hallamshire Senior Cup) | 3 | 35 | 22 |
| Worksop Town | 2024–25 | NPL Premier Division | 28 | 14 | 3 | 1 | — | | 5 (Note: Two appearances in FA Trophy, three appearances and three goals in Sheffield & Hallamshire Senior Cup) | 3 | 36 | 18 |
| Worksop Town | Total | | 88 | 57 | 14 | 12 | — | | 12 | 14 | 116 | 82 |
| Career total | | | 417 | 95 | 38 | 14 | 4 | 1 | 43 | 16 | 487 | 118 |

== Honours ==
Cambridge United

- FA Trophy: 2013–14

Worksop Town

- Northern Premier League East Division: 2022-23
