= Barry Corr =

Irish footballer

Personal information
- Full name: Barry Corr
- Date of birth: 2 April 1985 (age 41)
- Place of birth: Newcastle, County Wicklow, Ireland
- Height: 1.91 m (6 ft 3 in)
- Position: Forward

Youth career
- –2002: St. Anthony's Kilcoole

Senior career*
Years	Team	Apps	(Gls)
2002–2005	Leeds United	0	(0)
2005–2007	Sheffield Wednesday	17	(0)
2006	→ Bristol City (loan)	3	(0)
2007	→ Swindon Town (loan)	8	(3)
2007–2009	Swindon Town	28	(7)
2009–2010	Exeter City	34	(3)
2010–2015	Southend United	155	(50)
2015–2017	Cambridge United	29	(14)
2018–2019	Cambridge United	19	(5)
2020–2021	St Neots Town	3	(0)
Total		296	(82)

Managerial career
- 2020–2021: St Neots Town
- 2023: Cambridge United (caretaker)
- 2024: Cambridge United (caretaker)
- * Club domestic league appearances and goals

Barry Corr (born 2 April 1985) is an Irish football coach and former professional footballer who played as a striker.

== Club career ==
=== Early career ===
Corr started his career at St. Anthony's, Kilcoole before moving to Leeds United in 2001. He was released by Leeds in 2005, having suffered from injuries throughout his time at Leeds, and after trials at both Blackpool and Sheffield Wednesday, he agreed a two-year contract with the latter in summer 2005. At Wednesday he had loan spells with Bristol City, where he scored his first professional goal, and Swindon Town, helping them achieve promotion to League One with 3 goals in his 8 appearances and a nomination for League Two player of the month for April. He signed for Swindon on a permanent basis at the start of the 2007–08 season, later moving to Exeter City in July 2009. He left the club at the end of the season.

=== Southend United ===
Corr signed for Southend United on 9 July 2010 along with Peter Gilbert, both of whom had played previously for Southend's manager Paul Sturrock at Sheffield Wednesday. From 47 appearances he netted 21 goals for the Shrimpers, making him the club's highest scorer that season. He missed the whole of the 2011–12 season due to an ongoing knee injury, and returned on 22 September 2012 to score against former club Exeter. He spent most of the 2012–13 season as a substitute, but became a mainstay of the team the following season as Sturrock was replaced by Phil Brown. Corr signed a new two-year deal with Southend at the end of the season, and made his 150th appearance for the Blues on 27 September 2014 against Shrewsbury Town. Corr scored 63 goals in 181 appearances for Southend United.

=== Cambridge United ===
Corr signed a two-year deal with Cambridge United on 2 June 2015. He made his debut for the U's on the opening day of the 2015–16 season, scoring twice in a 3–0 victory over Newport County. His campaign was cut short in January 2016 as he had to undergo knee surgery, he had scored 12 goals in 24 appearances by that point. He was released when his contract expired in June 2017. He continued to train with the club after his release, and on 12 January 2018 he signed on non-contract terms until the end of the month, later extended until the end of the season.

On 7 June 2018 Corr signed a new six-month deal with Cambridge United, but the spell was disrupted by injury and he left the club when it expired.

== Coaching career ==
At the end of the 2018–19 season, Corr retired from football and on 9 July 2019 Cambridge United announced, that they had hired Corr as a development coach.

On 6 January 2020, Corr was appointed manager of St Neots Town as part of a new strategic collaboration between both clubs. Corr took over with St Neots 2nd from bottom of the Southern Central league. He departed the club in July 2021, after COVID-19 restrictions stopped the season with St Neots in 3rd place after 11 games and having reached the 2nd round proper of the FA Trophy, the furthest the club had gone in their history. He returned to Cambridge in the role of first-team coach.

In July 2023, he was named assistant head coach.

Following the departure of head coach Mark Bonner in November 2023, Corr was appointed head coach on an interim basis. He oversaw one match in interim charge, a 4–0 thrashing of Fleetwood Town in the FA Cup Second Round, before the appointment of Neil Harris on 6 December 2023 saw him revert to his original role. He was once again appointed caretaker head coach following the surprise departure of Harris to Millwall in February 2024.

He departed his role of assistant head coach at the end of the 2025–26 season.

== Honours ==
Swindon Town

- Football League Two third-placed promotion: 2006–07

Southend United

- Football League Two play-offs: 2015
- Football League Trophy runner-up: 2012–13

Individual

- Swindon Town Goal of the Season: 2007–08
- Southend United Supporters' Player of the Year: 2014–15
