= 2019–20 Cambridge United F.C. season =

Cambridge United
2019–20 season
- Head coach: Colin Calderwood (until 29 January); Mark Bonner (from 9 March)
- Stadium: Abbey Stadium
- League Two: 16th
- FA Cup: First round
- EFL Cup: Second round
- EFL Trophy: Group stage
- Top goalscorer: League: Sam Smith (7); All: Sam Smith (8); Harvey Knibbs (8)
- Highest home attendance: 5,408 vs Leyton Orient, League Two, 21 December 2019
- Lowest home attendance: 764 vs Northampton Town, EFL Trophy, 8 October 2019
- Average home league attendance: 4,178
Home colours	Away colours

The 2019–20 season was Cambridge United's 108th season in their history, their 41st in the Football League, and their sixth consecutive season in League Two. Along with League Two, the club participated in the FA Cup, EFL Cup and EFL Trophy.

The season covers the period from 1 July 2019 to 30 June 2020.

== Season squad ==
Note: Flags indicate national team as defined under FIFA eligibility rules; some limited exceptions apply. Players may hold more than one non-FIFA nationality.

No.	Pos.	Nation	Player
1	GK	BUL	Dimitar Mitov
2	DF	ENG	Kyle Knoyle
3	DF	ENG	Daniel Jones
4	DF	ENG	George Taft
5	DF	ENG	Greg Taylor
6	MF	IRL	Gary Deegan
7	MF	ENG	Luke Hannant
8	DF	ENG	Liam O'Neil
9	FW	SCO	Andrew Dallas
10	MF	ENG	George Maris
11	FW	ENG	Harrison Dunk
13	GK	ENG	Finley Iron
14	FW	ENG	Jabo Ibehre

No.	Pos.	Nation	Player
15	DF	ENG	Louis John
16	DF	ENG	Harry Darling
17	DF	ENG	Leon Davies
18	FW	ENG	Marc Richards
19	MF	BER	Reggie Lambe
20	FW	ENG	Sam Smith (on loan from Reading)
22	MF	ENG	Paul Lewis
23	MF	ENG	Tom Knowles
24	DF	ENG	Jordan Norville-Williams
25	GK	ENG	Callum Burton
26	FW	ENG	Harvey Knibbs
27	MF	ENG	Ben Worman
30	MF	CYP	Jack Roles (on loan from Tottenham Hotspur)

== Transfers ==
=== Transfers in ===
Date	Position	Nationality	Name	From	Fee	Ref.
1 July 2019	GK	(England)	Callum Burton	(England) Hull City	Free transfer	
1 July 2019	CM	(England)	Luke Hannant	(England) Port Vale	Free transfer	
1 July 2019	CF	(England)	Harvey Knibbs	(England) Aston Villa	Free transfer	
1 July 2019	RB	(England)	Kyle Knoyle	(England) Swindon Town	Free transfer	
19 July 2019	LB	(England)	Dan Jones	(England) Notts County	Free transfer	
29 July 2019	CF	(Scotland)	Andrew Dallas	(Scotland) Rangers	Undisclosed	
5 August 2019	CF	(England)	Marc Richards	(England) Swindon Town	Free transfer	
29 August 2019	CM	(Republic of Ireland)	Samir Carruthers	(England) Sheffield United	Free transfer	
13 September 2019	CB	(England)	Elliott Ward	(England) Notts County	Free transfer	

=== Loans in ===
Date from	Position	Nationality	Name	From	Date until	Ref.
2 August 2019	CF	(England)	Sam Smith	(England) Reading	30 June 2020	
20 August 2019	CM	(Cyprus)	Jack Roles	(England) Tottenham Hotspur	30 June 2020	
23 January 2020	MF	(Tunisia)	Idris El Mizouni	(England) Ipswich Town	30 June 2020	
24 January 2020	CF	(Nigeria)	Victor Adeboyejo	(England) Barnsley	30 June 2020	
31 January 2020	LB	(England)	Ben Coker	(England) Lincoln City	30 June 2020	
31 January 2020	CF	(England)	Paul Mullin	(England) Tranmere Rovers	30 June 2020	

=== Loans out ===
Date from	Position	Nationality	Name	To	Date until	Ref.
26 July 2019	CF	(England)	Joe Neal	(England) Needham Market	September 2019	
17 October 2019	RW	(England)	Tom Knowles	(England) Chelmsford City	3 March 2020	
12 November 2019	CB	(England)	Louis John	(England) Sutton United	January 2020	
21 November 2019	DM	(England)	Ben Worman	(England) Chelmsford City	December 2019	
11 March 2020	LB	(England)	Daniel Jones	(England) Solihull Moors	30 June 2020	

=== Transfers out ===
Date	Position	Nationality	Name	To	Fee	Ref.
1 July 2019	LB	(Republic of Ireland)	Jake Carroll	(Scotland) Motherwell	Free transfer	
1 July 2019	GK	(Republic of Ireland)	David Forde	Free agent	Released	
1 July 2019	CF	(England)	Matthew Foy	(England) Cambridge City	Released	
1 July 2019	RB	(England)	Brad Halliday	(England) Doncaster Rovers	Free transfer	
1 July 2019	RM	(Republic of Ireland)	Emmanuel Osadebe	(England) Macclesfield Town	Released	
1 July 2019	DM	(England)	Sam Squire	(England) Needham Market	Released	
1 July 2019	CM	(England)	Lee Watkins	(England) St Neots Town	Released	
4 July 2019	AM	(Jamaica)	Jevani Brown	(England) Colchester United	Undisclosed	
8 July 2019	RW	(England)	David Amoo	(England) Port Vale	Free transfer	
31 December 2019	CM	(Republic of Ireland)	Gary Deegan	(Republic of Ireland) Shelbourne	Free transfer	
16 January 2020	CF	(England)	Marc Richards	(England) Yeovil Town	Free transfer	
23 January 2020	CB	(England)	Louis John	(England) Sutton United	Undisclosed	

== Pre-season ==
On 23 May 2019, The U's announced their pre-season schedule. On 21 June 2019 a further two matches during a tour of Scotland were confirmed.

6 July 2019 Friendly	Fulham	1–3	Cambridge United	Motspur Park (Behind closed doors)
12:00 BST	de la Torre 57'	Report	Ibehre 7', 44'; Knibbs 31'	Stadium: Motspur Park Training Ground; Attendance: 0

12 July 2019 Friendly	Nottingham Forest U23	2–2	Cambridge United	West Bridgford (Behind closed doors)
12:00 BST	16'; 48'	Report	Lewis 8'; Ibehre 52'	Stadium: Wilford Lane; Attendance: 0

16 July 2019 Friendly	Rangers XI	2–0	Cambridge United	Milngavie (Behind closed doors)
11:30 BST	Dallas 9'; Barjonas 58'	Report		Stadium: The Hummel Training Centre; Attendance: 0

20 July 2019 Friendly	Heart of Midlothian	2–3	Cambridge United	Edinburgh (Behind closed doors)
13.00 BST	Mulraney 30'; Trialist 82'	Report	Lewis 18'; O'Neil 55'; Trialist 70'	Stadium: Tynecastle Park

20 July 2019 Friendly	St Neots Town	6–0	Cambridge United XI	St Neots
15:00 BST	Gomarsall 6'; Mutswumbuma 26', 41', 43'; Connor 60' (pen.); Nkala 77'	Report		Stadium: Rowley Park; Attendance: 272

23 July 2019 Friendly	Cambridge United	0–3	Leicester City	Cambridge
19:30 BST		Report	Maguire 59'; Iheanacho 83'; Choudhury 87'	Stadium: Abbey Stadium; Attendance: 4,555

23 July 2019 Friendly	Histon	1–1	Cambridge United XI	Impington
19:00 BST				Stadium: Bridge Road

26 July 2019 Friendly	Newmarket Town	2–2	Cambridge United XI	Newmarket
19:00 BST				Stadium: Cricket Field Road

27 July 2019 Friendly	Cambridge United	0–0	Ipswich Town	Cambridge
13:00 BST	Ibehre (red card) 86'	Report	Downes (red card) 86'	Stadium: Abbey Stadium; Attendance: 3,619

== Competitions ==
=== League Two ===
==== League table ====
Pos	Team	Pld	W	D	L	GF	GA	GD	Pts	PPG
12	Walsall	36	13	8	15	40	49	−9	47	1.31
13	Crawley Town	37	11	15	11	51	47	+4	48	1.30
14	Newport County	36	12	10	14	32	39	−7	46	1.28
15	Grimsby Town	37	12	11	14	45	51	−6	47	1.27
16	Cambridge United	37	12	9	16	40	48	−8	45	1.22
17	Leyton Orient	36	10	12	14	47	55	−8	42	1.17
18	Carlisle United	37	10	12	15	39	56	−17	42	1.14
19	Oldham Athletic	37	9	14	14	44	57	−13	41	1.11
20	Scunthorpe United	37	10	10	17	44	56	−12	40	1.08

Source: EFL Official Website
Rules for classification: 1) Points per game; 2) Goal difference; 3) Number of goals scored; 4) Head-to-head results; 5) Wins; 6) Away goals; 7) Penalty points (sec 9.5); 8) 12-point sending off offences

==== Results summary ====
Overall								Home						Away					
Pld	W	D	L	GF	GA	GD	Pts	W	D	L	GF	GA	GD	W	D	L	GF	GA	GD
37	12	9	16	40	48	−8	45	7	3	8	23	27	−4	5	6	8	17	21	−4

Last updated: 7 March 2020.
Source: BBC

==== Results by matchday ====
Matchday	1	2	3	4	5	6	7	8	9	10	11	12	13	14	15	16	17	18	19	20	21	22	23	24	25	26	27	28	29	30	31	32	33	34	35	36	37
Ground	A	H	A	H	H	A	H	A	A	H	A	H	A	H	H	A	H	A	A	H	A	H	A	H	H	A	A	H	A	H	H	A	A	H	A	H	A
Result	D	D	W	W	L	L	L	W	W	L	D	D	L	W	D	L	W	L	D	W	D	L	L	W	L	L	L	L	D	L	W	W	W	W	D	L	L
Position	15	18	10	3	11	14	16	12	8	11	11	11	16	10	11	13	12	13	13	11	11	11	13	12	13	13	16	16	16	18	16	15	12	12	11	13	16

Updated to match(es) played on 7 March 2020. Source: Statto.com
A = Away; H = Home; W = Win; D = Draw; L = Loss

==== Matches ====
On Thursday, 20 June 2019, the EFL League Two fixtures were revealed.

3 August 2019 1	Bradford City	0–0	Cambridge United	Bradford
15:00 BST	Vaughan (yellow card) 74'; Mellor (yellow card) 80'; Donaldson (yellow card) 89'	Report	O'Neil (red card) 61'	Stadium: Northern Commercials Stadium; Attendance: 14,810; Referee: Ollie Yates

10 August 2019 2	Cambridge United	0–0	Newport County	Cambridge
15:00 BST	Lewis (yellow card) 66'	Report	McNamara (yellow card) 15'	Stadium: Abbey Stadium; Attendance: 3,949; Referee: Marc Edwards

17 August 2019 3	Colchester United	1–2	Cambridge United	Colchester
15:00 BST	Norris 9' (pen.)	Report	Richards 54'; Dunk (yellow card) 83'; Darling 86' (yellow card) 87'	Stadium: Colchester Community Stadium; Attendance: 4,148; Referee: Antony Coggins

20 August 2019 4	Cambridge United	3–2	Scunthorpe United	Cambridge
19:45 BST	Darling (yellow card) 39'; Knibbs 52', 54'; Lewis 73'; Taft (yellow card) 60'; Dunk (yellow card) 65'	Report	Perch (red card) 21'; Gilliead (yellow card) 26'; McArdle 41', 60'; Wootton (yellow card) 45'	Stadium: Abbey Stadium; Attendance: 3,917; Referee: Charles Breakspear

24 August 2019 5	Cambridge United	1–2	Oldham Athletic	Cambridge
15:00 BST	Richards 35'	Report	Vera 28'; Wheater 67'; Fage (yellow card) 73'; Sylla (yellow card) 78'; Maouche (yellow card) 88'; Hamer (yellow card) 90+1'	Stadium: Abbey Stadium; Attendance: 4,004; Referee: Scott Oldham

31 August 2019 6	Port Vale	1–0	Cambridge United	Burslem
15:00 BST	Gibbons (yellow card) 79'; Davies 84' (o.g.)	Report	Taft (yellow card) 32'; O'Neil (yellow card) 53'; Roles (yellow card) 78'	Stadium: Vale Park; Attendance: 4,874; Referee: James Oldham

7 September 2019 7	Cambridge United	0–1	Forest Green Rovers	Cambridge
15:00 BST		Report	Aitchison 78'	Stadium: Abbey Stadium; Attendance: 3,784; Referee: Anthony Backhouse

14 September 2019 8	Crewe Alexandra	2–3	Cambridge United	Crewe
15:00 BST	Green (red card) 41'; Nolan 63'; Anene 67'	Report	Smith 12', 72' (pen.); Knoyle (yellow card) 49'; Darling (yellow card) 58'; Lewis 69'; Hannant (yellow card) 83'	Stadium: Alexandra Stadium; Attendance: 3,568; Referee: David Rock

17 September 2019 9	Mansfield Town	0–4	Cambridge United	Mansfield
19:45 BST	Preston (red card) 49'; Gordon (yellow card) 58'; Rose (yellow card) 71'	Report	Knoyle (yellow card) 10'; Darling (yellow card) 45+1'; Dunk (yellow card) 61'; Roles 74'; Smith 86'; Maris 90'; Lambe 90+5' (pen.)	Stadium: One Call Stadium; Attendance: 3,567; Referee: Darren Handley

21 September 2019 10	Cambridge United	0–1	Swindon Town	Cambridge
15:00 BST	Lambe (yellow card) 40'	Report	Yates 27'; Conroy (yellow card) 60'; Isgrove (yellow card) 63'; Doyle (yellow card) 90+5'	Stadium: Abbey Stadium; Attendance: 4,443; Referee: Peter Wright

28 September 2019 11	Stevenage	1–1	Cambridge United	Stevenage
15:00 BST	Cowley 9'; Timlin (yellow card) 21'; Farman (yellow card) 68'	Report	Roles (yellow card) 48'; Smith 83'; Lewis (yellow card) 89'	Stadium: The Lamex Stadium; Attendance: 3,452; Referee: Will Finnie

5 October 2019 12	Cambridge United	2–2	Macclesfield Town	Cambridge
15:00 BST	Roles 13'; Smith 78'; Hannant (yellow card) 90+1'	Report	Harris (yellow card) 51'; Archibald 65'; Gnahoua 68'; Vassell (yellow card) 77'; Kirby (yellow card) 90+4'	Stadium: Abbey Stadium; Attendance: 3,678; Referee: Josh Smith

12 October 2019 13	Salford City	1–0	Cambridge United	Salford
15:00 BST	Maynard (yellow card) 34'; Rooney 77'	Report		Stadium: The Peninsula Stadium; Attendance: 3,026; Referee: Carl Boyeson

19 October 2019 14	Cambridge United	4–0	Exeter City	Cambridge
15:00 BST	Hannant 38'; Roles 57'; Taft 72'; Dallas 87'	Report	Sweeney (yellow card) 30'; Atangana (yellow card) 45+1'	Stadium: Abbey Stadium; Attendance: 3,816; Referee: Leigh Doughty

22 October 2019 15	Cambridge United	0–0	Grimsby Town	Cambridge
19:45 BST	Smith (penalty missed) 37'	Report	Whitehouse (yellow card) 24'	Stadium: Abbey Stadium; Attendance: 4,898; Referee: James Adcock

26 October 2019 16	Northampton Town	2–0	Cambridge United	Northampton
15:00 BST	Smith 26'; Taft 45+1' (o.g.); Hoskins (yellow card) 45+4'; McCormack (yellow card) 51'	Report	Lambe (yellow card) 45+4'	Stadium: The PTS Academy Stadium; Attendance: 5,221; Referee: Graham Salisbury

2 November 2019 17	Cambridge United	2–1	Crawley Town	Cambridge
15:00 GMT	Smith (yellow card) 70' (goal) 83'; O'Neil (yellow card) 75'; Lewis 86'	Report	Ferguson (yellow card) 12'; Lubala 80'; Dallison (yellow card) 90'	Stadium: Abbey Stadium; Attendance: 3,538; Referee: Nick Kinseley

16 November 2019 18	Walsall	2–1	Cambridge United	Bescot
15:00 GMT	Gordon 1'; Sadler 10'; Holden (yellow card) 84'	Report	Roles (yellow card) 64'; Knibbs 90+2'	Stadium: Banks's Stadium; Attendance: 5,429; Referee: Paul Marsden

23 November 2019 19	Carlisle United	0–0	Cambridge United	Carlisle
15:00 GMT	Loft (yellow card) 29'; Carroll (yellow card) 70'	Report	Hannant (yellow card) 26'; Lewis (yellow card) 39'; Smith (yellow card) 83'	Stadium: Brunton Park; Attendance: 4,041; Referee: Sebastian Stockbridge

7 December 2019 20	Cambridge United	1–0	Plymouth Argyle	Cambridge
15:00 GMT	Knoyle 18'; Taylor (yellow card) 50'; Lewis (yellow card) 57'; Carruthers (yellow card) 66'	Report	Canavan (yellow card) 33'; Edwards (yellow card) 43'	Stadium: Abbey Stadium; Attendance: 4,492; Referee: Michael Salisbury

14 December 2019 21	Cheltenham Town	1–1	Cambridge United	Cheltenham
15:00 GMT	Boyle 53'	Report	Ward (yellow card) 25'; Lewis 27'; Lambe (yellow card) 51'	Stadium: Jonny-Rocks Stadium; Attendance: 2,813; Referee: Robert Lewis

21 December 2019 22	Cambridge United	2–3	Leyton Orient	Cambridge
15:00 GMT	Hannant (yellow card) 40'; Lambe (yellow card) 41' (yellow-red card) 84'; Roles 69'; Taylor (yellow card) 76'; Smith 82' (pen.)	Report	Marsh (yellow card) 15'; Turley 29' (yellow card) 81'; Wright (penalty missed) 36' 36'; Clay (yellow card) 38'; Angol (yellow card) 45'; Maguire-Drew 45+2'; Judd (yellow card) 65' (yellow-red card) 85'; Brophy (yellow card) 67'	Stadium: Abbey Stadium; Attendance: 5,408; Referee: Trevor Kettle

26 December 2019 23	Swindon Town	4–0	Cambridge United	Swindon
15:00 GMT	Doyle 5' (pen.); Anderson 40', 45+1', 66'; Grant (yellow card) 48'; Iandolo (yellow card) 82'	Report	Roles (yellow card) 5'; Taft (yellow card) 22'; Lewis (yellow card) 48'	Stadium: County Ground; Attendance: 8,211; Referee: Josh Smith

29 December 2019 24	Cambridge United	1–0	Morecambe	Cambridge
15:00 GMT	Roles 57'	Report	Kenyon (yellow card) 54'	Stadium: Abbey Stadium; Attendance: 4,086; Referee: Will Finnie

1 January 2020 25	Cambridge United	2–3	Mansfield Town	Cambridge
15:00 GMT	Knibbs 3'; Taylor 44'; Lambe (yellow card) 57' (yellow-red card) 59'; Roles (yellow card) 90+1'	Report	Maynard 36', 71', 81'; Mellis (yellow card) 90+6'	Stadium: Abbey Stadium; Attendance: 3,848; Referee: Neil Hair

4 January 2020 26	Macclesfield Town	1–0	Cambridge United	Macclesfield
15:00 GMT	Gnahoua 5'; Welch-Hayes (yellow card) 58'	Report	Jones (yellow card) 58'; Hannant (yellow card) 78'	Stadium: Moss Rose; Attendance: 1,454; Referee: Tom Nield

11 January 2020 27	Exeter City	2–0	Cambridge United	Exeter
15:00 GMT	Collins (yellow card) 38'; Bowman 53'; Williams 81'	Report		Stadium: St James Park; Attendance: 4,517; Referee: James Oldham

18 January 2020 28	Cambridge United	0–4	Stevenage	Cambridge
15:00 GMT	Knoyle (yellow card) 23'; O'Neil (yellow card) 39'; Lewis (yellow card) 90'	Report	List 36'; Cassidy 59'; Carter 87'; Lakin 90+4'	Stadium: Abbey Stadium; Attendance: 4,228; Referee: Ross Joyce

25 January 2020 29	Morecambe	1–1	Cambridge United	Morecambe
15:00 GMT	Phillips 46' (yellow card) 55'; Slew (yellow card) 59'; Cooney (yellow card) 90+2'	Report	Lewis (yellow card) 25'; Maris (yellow card) 36'; Knibbs 68'	Stadium: Globe Arena; Attendance: 2,019; Referee: Carl Boyeson

28 January 2020 30	Cambridge United	0–4	Salford City	Cambridge
19:45 GMT	Jones (yellow card) 33'; O'Neil (yellow card) 63'; Lewis (yellow card) 84'	Report	Rooney 32', 52' (pen.); Thomas-Asante (yellow card) 45'; Hunter 55'; Andrade (yellow card) 83'; Touray 88'	Stadium: Abbey Stadium; Attendance: 3,444; Referee: Christopher Pollard

1 February 2020 31	Cambridge United	2–1	Colchester United	Cambridge
15:00 GMT	Dallas 85'; Knibbs 86'; O'Neil (yellow card) 89'; Darling (yellow card) 90+2'	Report	Norris 67'; Nouble (yellow card) 90+1'	Stadium: Abbey Stadium; Attendance: 5,015; Referee: Brett Huxtable

8 February 2020 32	Newport County	0–1	Cambridge United	Newport
15:00 GMT		Report	O'Neil 68'	Stadium: Rodney Parade; Attendance: 3,336; Referee: Lee Swabey

11 February 2020 33	Scunthorpe United	0–2	Cambridge United	Scunthorpe
19:45 GMT		Report	El Mizouni 16'; Mullin 61'	Stadium: Sands Venue Stadium; Attendance: 2,746; Referee: Thomas Bramall

15 February 2020 34	Cambridge United	2–1	Bradford City	Cambridge
15:00 GMT	Darling 84'; Knibbs 90+1'	Report	Reeves 17'; Pritchard (yellow card) 90+5'	Stadium: Abbey Stadium; Attendance: 4,541; Referee: Nick Kinseley

22 February 2020 35	Plymouth Argyle	0–0	Cambridge United	Plymouth
15:00 GMT	Sawyer (yellow card) 87'	Report	Carruthers (yellow card) 44'; Maris (yellow card) 80'	Stadium: Home Park; Attendance: 11,597; Referee: Will Finnie

29 February 2020 36	Cambridge United	1–2	Carlisle United	Cambridge
15:00 GMT	Roles (yellow card) 78'; Lambe 82'	Report	Alessandra 27'; Hayden (yellow card) 59'; Webster (yellow card) 64'; Anderton 73'; McKirdy (yellow card) 80'; Charters (yellow card) 89'; Olomola (yellow card) 90+3'	Stadium: Abbey Stadium; Attendance: 4,122; Referee: Charles Breakspear

7 March 2020 37	Leyton Orient	2–1	Cambridge United	Leyton
15:00 GMT	Maguire-Drew 17'; Johnson (yellow card) 45' (goal) 45+4'; Marsh (yellow card) 60'	Report	Darling (yellow card) 55'; Mullin 63'; Maris (yellow card) 80'	Stadium: Breyer Group Stadium; Attendance: 5,813; Referee: Paul Marsden

14 March 2020	Cambridge United	v	Cheltenham Town	Cambridge
15:00 GMT				Stadium: Abbey Stadium
Note: Season was suspended until 3 April 2020, due to the COVID-19 pandemic.

17 March 2020	Grimsby Town	v	Cambridge United	Cleethorpes
19:45 GMT				Stadium: Blundell Park
Note: Season was suspended until 3 April 2020, due to the COVID-19 pandemic.

21 March 2020	Cambridge United	v	Northampton Town	Cambridge
15:00 GMT				Stadium: Abbey Stadium
Note: Season was suspended until 3 April 2020, due to the COVID-19 pandemic.

28 March 2020	Crawley Town	v	Cambridge United	Crawley
15:00 GMT				Stadium: The People's Pension Stadium
Note: Season was suspended until 3 April 2020, due to the COVID-19 pandemic.

4 April 2020	Cambridge United	v	Walsall	Cambridge
15:00 BST				Stadium: Abbey Stadium
Note: On 3 April, the English Football League decided to postpone all football until safe to do so due to the COVID-19 pandemic.

10 April 2020	Oldham Athletic	v	Cambridge United	Oldham
15:00 BST				Stadium: Boundary Park
Note: On 3 April, the English Football League decided to postpone all football until safe to do so due to the COVID-19 pandemic.

13 April 2020	Cambridge United	v	Port Vale	Cambridge
13:00 BST				Stadium: Abbey Stadium
Note: On 3 April, the English Football League decided to postpone all football until safe to do so due to the COVID-19 pandemic.

18 April 2020	Forest Green Rovers	v	Cambridge United	Nailsworth
15:00 BST				Stadium: The New Lawn
Note: On 3 April, the English Football League decided to postpone all football until safe to do so due to the COVID-19 pandemic.

25 April 2020	Cambridge United	v	Crewe Alexandra	Cambridge
15:00 BST				Stadium: Abbey Stadium
Note: On 3 April, the English Football League decided to postpone all football until safe to do so due to the COVID-19 pandemic.

=== FA Cup ===
The first round draw was made on 21 October 2019.

9 November 2019 First round	Cambridge United	1–1	Exeter City	Cambridge
15:00 BST	Jones (yellow card) 18'; Smith 90+3'	Report	Fisher 34'; Bowman (yellow card) 70'; Tillson (yellow card) 90+2'	Stadium: Abbey Stadium; Attendance: 2,302; Referee: Peter Wright

19 November 2019 First round replay	Exeter City	1–0	Cambridge United	Exeter
19:45 GMT	Martin (yellow card) 48'; Fisher 70'	Report	Roles (yellow card) 83'	Stadium: St James Park; Attendance: 2,719

=== EFL Cup ===
The first round draw was made on 20 June. The second round draw was made on 13 August 2019 following the conclusion of all but one first-round matches.

13 August 2019 First round	Brentford	1–1 (4–5 p)	Cambridge United	Brentford
19:45 BST	Thompson (yellow card) 18'; Forss 69'	Report	Richards 3'; John (yellow card) 20'	Stadium: Griffin Park; Attendance: 5,215; Referee: Lee Swabey
	Penalties
	Jensen (penalty scored); Marcondes (penalty missed); Mbeumo (penalty scored); Watkins (penalty scored); Forss (penalty scored); Racic (penalty missed)		(penalty scored) Hannant; (penalty missed) Lewis; (penalty scored) Dunk; (penalty scored) Lambe; (penalty scored) Darling; (penalty scored) Knibbs

28 August 2019 Second round	Swansea City	6–0	Cambridge United	Swansea
19:45 BST	Peterson 1'; Byers 20'; Surridge 24', 45+1'; Garrick 31'; Routledge 76'	Report	Lambe (yellow card) 56'	Stadium: Liberty Stadium; Attendance: 8,763; Referee: Michael Salisbury

=== EFL Trophy ===
On 9 July 2019, the pre-determined group stage draw was announced with Invited clubs to be drawn on 12 July 2019.

Pos	Div	Team	Pld	W	PW	PL	L	GF	GA	GD	Pts	Qualification
1	L1	Peterborough United	3	3	0	0	0	5	1	+4	9	Advance to Round 2
2	L2	Northampton Town	3	1	1	0	1	2	3	−1	5	Advance to Round 2
3	ACA	Arsenal U21	3	0	1	1	1	2	3	−1	3	
4	L2	Cambridge United	3	0	0	1	2	2	4	−2	1	

Source: EFL.com

8 October 2019 Group stage	Cambridge United	0–1	Northampton Town	Cambridge
19:30 BST	Worman (yellow card) 48'	Report	Smith 17'; Hall-Johnson (yellow card) 55'	Stadium: Abbey Stadium; Attendance: 764; Referee: Sam Purkiss

5 November 2019 Group stage	Cambridge United	1–1 (3–4 p)	Arsenal U21	Cambridge
19:30 GMT	O'Neil (yellow card) 32' (yellow-red card) 50'; Knibbs 40'; Darling (yellow card) 90'	Report	John-Jules 59'; Mavropanos (yellow card) 90+2'	Stadium: Abbey Stadium; Attendance: 914; Referee: Charles Breakspear
	Penalties
	Maris (penalty scored); Smith (penalty scored); Dunk (penalty missed); Lambe (penalty scored); Jones (penalty missed)		Omole (penalty missed); Greenwood (penalty scored); Burton (penalty scored); Medley (penalty scored); Cottrell (penalty scored)

12 November 2019 Group stage	Peterborough United	2–1	Cambridge United	Peterborough
19:30 GMT	Ward 9'; R. Jones 30'; A. Jones (yellow card) 83'	Report	Norville-Williams (yellow card) 77'; Knibbs 79'; Smith (yellow card) 90'	Stadium: Weston Homes Stadium; Attendance: 3,425; Referee: Christopher Pollard
