= Jordan Norville-Williams =

English footballer

- Norville-Williams with Yeovil Town in 2026

Personal information
- Full name: Jordan Zion Wilford Norville-Williams
- Date of birth: 26 January 2000 (age 26)
- Place of birth: Kingston upon Thames, England
- Height: 1.80 m (5 ft 11 in)
- Position: Full back

Team information
- Current team: Yeovil Town
- Number: 3

Youth career
- –2016: Arsenal
- 2016–2017: Cambridge United

Senior career*
Years	Team	Apps	(Gls)
2017–2020	Cambridge United	5	(0)
2017	→ Cambridge City (loan)	1	(0)
2018	→ Harlow Town (loan)	1	(0)
2018	→ St Neots Town (loan)	7	(2)
2018	→ Royston Town (loan)	11	(0)
2018–2019	→ St Neots Town (loan)	22	(1)
2019	→ Hitchin Town (loan)	5	(0)
2020–2022	Hayes & Yeading United	42	(2)
2022–2024	Farnborough	75	(7)
2024–2026	Dorking Wanderers	66	(1)
2025	Dorking Wanderers B	1	(0)
2026–	Yeovil Town	15	(0)
- * Club domestic league appearances and goals as of 11:09, 28 October 2026 (UTC)

Jordan Zion Wilford Norville-Williams (born 26 January 2000) is an English professional footballer who plays as a full back for Yeovil Town.

== Career ==
In 2016, Norville-Williams joined Cambridge United from Arsenal after his release from the latter at under-16 level, signing his first professional contract with Cambridge in May 2018. During the 2017–18 season, Norville-Williams had one game loan spells with both Cambridge City and Harlow Town, as well as joining St Neots Town for a seven-game spell, where he scored twice for the club. Norville-Williams began the 2018–19 season on loan at Royston Town, making 11 league appearances, before returning to St Neots again until April 2019. Prior to the 2019–20 season, Norville-Williams signed for Hitchin Town on loan, making six appearances in all competitions. On 12 November 2019, Norville-Williams made his debut for Cambridge United in a 2–1 EFL Trophy defeat against rivals Peterborough United.

In October 2020, Norville-Williams signed for Hayes & Yeading United.

On 1 August 2022, Norville-Williams joined Farnborough following a successful trial period.

On 26 April 2024, it was announced that Norville-Williams would join Dorking Wanderers ahead of the 2024–25 campaign. On 15 May 2026, it was announced that Norville-Williams would leave the club at the end of his contract in June.

== Career statistics ==
As of match played 27 October 2026.

Club	Season	League			FA Cup		League Cup		Other		Total	
Club	Season	Division	Apps	Goals	Apps	Goals	Apps	Goals	Apps	Goals	Apps	Goals
Cambridge United	2017–18	League Two	0	0	0	0	0	0	0	0	0	0
Cambridge United	2018–19	League Two	0	0	—		0	0	0	0	0	0
Cambridge United	2019–20	League Two	5	0	—		0	0	1 (Note: Appearance in the EFL Trophy)	0	6	0
Cambridge United	Total		5	0	0	0	0	0	1	0	6	0
Cambridge City (loan)	2017–18	Southern League Division One East	1	0	0	0	—		0	0	1	0
Harlow Town (loan)	2017–18	Isthmian League Premier Division	1	0	—		—		—		1	0
St Neots Town (loan)	2017–18	Southern League Premier Division	7	2	—		—		—		7	2
Royston Town (loan)	2018–19	Southern League Premier Division Central	11	0	1	0	—		4 (Note: Appearances in the FA Trophy)	0	16	0
St Neots Town (loan)	2018–19	Southern League Premier Division Central	22	1	—		—		—		22	1
Hitchin Town (loan)	2019–20	Southern League Premier Division Central	5	0	1	0	—		0	0	6	0
Hayes & Yeading United	2020–21	Southern League Premier Division South	4	0	4	0	—		1	0	9	0
Hayes & Yeading United	2021–22	Southern League Premier Division South	38	2	6	0	—		4 (Note: One appearance in the FA Trophy, one in the Southern League Cup, two in the Southern League Premier Division South play-offs)	0	48	2
Hayes & Yeading United	Total		42	2	10	0	—		5	0	57	2
Farnborough	2022–23	National League South	37	4	6	0	—		2	0	45	4
Farnborough	2023–24	National League South	38	3	0	0	—		1	0	39	3
Farnborough	Total		75	7	6	0	—		3	0	84	7
Dorking Wanderers	2024–25	National League South	38	1	0	0	—		2 (Note: One appearance in the FA Trophy, one in the National League South play-offs)	0	40	1
Dorking Wanderers	2025–26	National League South	28	0	4	0	—		1	0	33	0
Dorking Wanderers	Total		66	1	4	0	—		3	0	73	1
Dorking Wanderers B	2025–26	Southern Combination League Division One	1	0	—		—		2 (Note: Appearance in the Southern Combination League Division One Cup)	0	2	0
Yeovil Town	2026–27	National League	15	0	2	0	—		0	0	17	0
Career total			251	13	24	0	0	0	17	0	292	13
