= Leon Davies =

English footballer

Personal information
- Full name: Leon Ross Nikoro Davies
- Date of birth: 22 November 1999 (age 26)
- Place of birth: Enfield, England
- Height: 1.80 m (5 ft 11 in)
- Position: Defender

Youth career
- 2007–2016: Cambridge United

Senior career*
Years	Team	Apps	(Gls)
2016–2022	Cambridge United	66	(0)
2019	→ Bath City (loan)	3	(0)
2021	→ Weymouth (loan)	2	(0)
2022	Southend United	16	(0)
2022–2024	Braintree Town	83	(0)
- * Club domestic league appearances and goals as of 18:31, 13 April 2024 (UTC)

Leon Ross Nikoro Davies (born 22 November 1999) is an English footballer who last played as a defender for National League South club Braintree Town. He attended Impington Village College from 2011 to 2016.

== Career ==
Davies was a Cambridge United youth graduate and earned himself a professional contract with Cambridge United . He made his first team debut on 30 August 2016 in a 1–0 EFL Trophy win against Shrewsbury Town. He made his League Two debut on 2 January 2017 coming on a substitute in a 4–0 win against Notts County.

On 18 January 2019, Davies joined National League South side Bath City on loan for a month. He was offered a new contract by Cambridge United at the end of the 2018–19 season. During the off season Davies signed a new two-year contract with Cambridge keepon him at the club until the summer of 2021.

On 29 November 2021, Davies joined National League side Weymouth on a one-month loan deal.

On 11 January 2022, Davies joined National League side Southend United on a permanent deal until summer 2022.

On 15 July 2022, Davies agreed to join fellow Essex-based side, Braintree Town ahead of the 2022–23 campaign.

== Career statistics ==
As of 6 May 2024

Appearances and goals by club, season and competition
Club	Season	League			FA Cup		League Cup		Other		Total	
Club	Season	Division	Apps	Goals	Apps	Goals	Apps	Goals	Apps	Goals	Apps	Goals
Cambridge United	2016–17	League Two	5	0	0	0	0	0	4 (Note: Appearances in the EFL Trophy)	0	9	0
Cambridge United	2017–18	League Two	4	0	0	0	0	0	2	0	6	0
Cambridge United	2018–19	League Two	6	0	0	0	0	0	3	0	9	0
Cambridge United	2019–20	League Two	16	0	0	0	2	0	3	0	21	0
Cambridge United	2020–21	League Two	11	0	0	0	1	0	5	0	17	0
Cambridge United	2021–22	League One	0	0	0	0	0	0	2	0	2	0
Cambridge United	Total		42	0	0	0	3	0	19	0	64	0
Bath City (loan)	2018–19	National League South	3	0	—		—		—		3	0
Weymouth (loan)	2021–22	National League	2	0	—		—		1 (Note: Appearances in the FA Trophy)	0	3	0
Southend United	2021–22	National League	16	0	—		—		—		16	0
Braintree Town	2022–23	National League South	39	0	3	0	—		4 (Note: Three appearances in the FA Trophy, one in the National League South play-offs)	0	46	0
Braintree Town	2023–24	National League South	44	0	5	0	—		4 (Note: One appearance in the FA Trophy, three appearances and one goal in the National League South play-offs)	1	53	1
Braintree Town	Total		83	0	8	0	—		8	1	99	1
Career total			146	0	8	0	3	0	28	1	185	1

== Honours ==
Braintree Town

- National League South play-offs: 2024
