= Ben Worman =

English footballer (born 2001)

Personal information
- Full name: Benjamin Paul Worman
- Date of birth: 30 August 2001 (age 25)
- Place of birth: Cambridge, England
- Height: 5 ft 8 in (1.72 m)
- Position: Midfielder

Team information
- Current team: Chelmsford City (on loan from Solihull Moors)
- Number: 26

Youth career
- Waterbeach Colts
- Cambridge United

Senior career*
Years	Team	Apps	(Gls)
2017–2023	Cambridge United	29	(1)
2018	→ St Neots Town (loan)	5	(0)
2019	→ Bishop's Stortford (loan)	5	(1)
2019	→ Chelmsford City (loan)	0	(0)
2020	→ St Neots Town (loan)	6	(6)
2021	→ Weymouth (loan)	9	(0)
2023	Cork City	11	(0)
2024–2025	Gateshead	64	(2)
2025–	Solihull Moors	50	(0)
2026–	→ Chelmsford City (loan)	1	(0)
- * Club domestic league appearances and goals as of 22 November 2026

Benjamin Paul Worman (born 30 August 2001) is an English professional footballer who plays as a midfielder for Chelmsford City, on loan from National League club Solihull Moors.

He became the youngest player to play for Cambridge United after making his first-team debut in November 2017.

== Career ==
Worman came through the youth-team at Cambridge United and made his first-team debut in an EFL Trophy match on 7 November 2017, coming on as an 83rd-minute substitute for Uche Ikpeazu in a 2–0 defeat by Peterborough United at the Abbey Stadium. At the age of 16, this made him the youngest ever player to take part in a competitive match for the "U's"; manager Shaun Derry said that it was a "fantastic" experience for the youngster. In September 2018, following the signing of a three-year professional contract, Worman joined St Neots Town on loan.

On 18 January 2019, Worman joined Bishop's Stortford on a one-month loan deal. The deal was later extended first for a month, and later until the end of the season.

On 21 November 2019, Worman signed for National League South club Chelmsford City on an initial one-month loan deal.

He scored his first goal for Cambridge United on 10 November 2020 in an EFL Trophy group game against Peterborough United.

On 3 August 2023, Worman signed for League of Ireland Premier Division side Cork City.

On 9 January 2024, Worman signed for National League club Gateshead on a short-term contract until the end of the season with the option for a one-year extension.

In June 2025, Worman joined fellow National League side Solihull Moors. On 14 November 2026, after 50 league appearances for Solihull Moors, Worman signed for Chelmsford City, returning to the club he had signed on loan for seven years prior.

== Statistics ==
As of end of 2024–25 season

Appearances and goals by club, season and competition
Club	Season	League			National Cup		League Cup		Other		Total	
Club	Season	Division	Apps	Goals	Apps	Goals	Apps	Goals	Apps	Goals	Apps	Goals
Cambridge United	2017–18	League Two	0	0	0	0	0	0	1 (Note: Appearance(s) in the EFL Trophy.)	0	1	0
Cambridge United	2018–19	League Two	1	0	0	0	0	0	0	0	1	0
Cambridge United	2019–20	League Two	0	0	0	0	0	0	2	0	2	0
Cambridge United	2020–21	League Two	0	0	0	0	0	0	2	1	2	1
Cambridge United	2021–22	League One	13	1	4	1	2	0	6	0	25	2
Cambridge United	2022–23	League One	15	0	3	0	1	0	2	0	21	0
Cambridge United	Total		29	1	7	1	3	0	13	1	52	3
Cork City	2023	LOI Premier Division	11	0	3	0	–		2 (Note: One appearance in Munster Senior Cup and one appearance in 2023 League of Ireland Premier Division Promotion/Relegation Playoff.)	0	16	0
Gateshead	2023–24	National League	20	1	0	0	–		5 (Note: Appearance(s) in FA Trophy)	1	25	2
Gateshead	2024–25	National League	44	1	2	0	—		2	1	48	2
Gateshead	Total		64	2	2	0	0	0	7	2	73	4
Career total			104	3	12	1	3	0	22	3	141	7

== Honours ==
Gateshead

- FA Trophy: 2023–24
