= George Taft =

English footballer

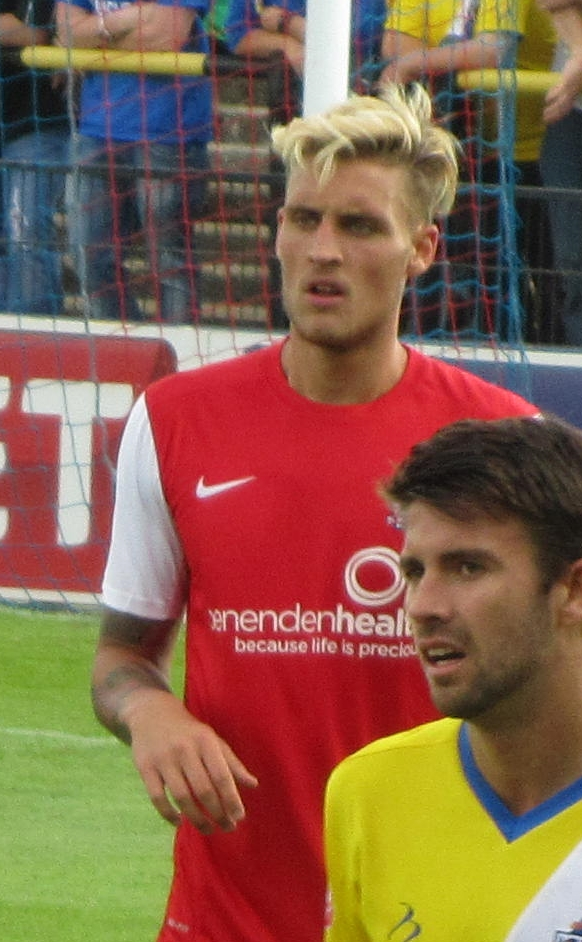
- Taft playing for York City in 2013

Personal information
- Full name: George William Taft
- Date of birth: 29 July 1993 (age 33)
- Place of birth: Leicester, England
- Height: 6 ft 3 in (1.91 m)
- Position: Centre back

Youth career
- –2011: Leicester City

Senior career*
Years	Team	Apps	(Gls)
2011–2014	Leicester City	0	(0)
2011	→ Kettering Town (loan)	14	(0)
2012	→ Karlstad BK (loan)	12	(0)
2013	→ York City (loan)	3	(0)
2014–2016	Burton Albion	30	(1)
2015	→ Cambridge United (loan)	11	(1)
2016–2018	Mansfield Town	13	(0)
2017–2018	→ Cambridge United (loan)	10	(0)
2018	→ Cambridge United (loan)	18	(1)
2018–2020	Cambridge United	64	(3)
2020–2021	Bolton Wanderers	1	(0)
2021	→ Scunthorpe United (loan)	5	(0)
2021–2023	Scunthorpe United	71	(2)
2023–2024	Worksop Town	25	(1)
2024	Mickleover	9	(1)
Total		277	(10)

International career
2010	England U18	1	(1)
2011	England U19	5	(0)
- * Club domestic league appearances and goals as of 13:04, 23 October 2024 (UTC)

George William Taft (born 29 July 1993) is an English former professional footballer who played as a centre back.

A graduate of Leicester City's youth academy, Taft failed to break into the first team and was loaned out to Kettering Town, Karlstad BK and York City. In 2014, he joined League Two club Burton Albion on a two-year contract. Taft was capped by England at under-18 and under-19 level, and was a member of the squad for the 2011 FIFA U-20 World Cup.

== Club career ==
=== Leicester City ===
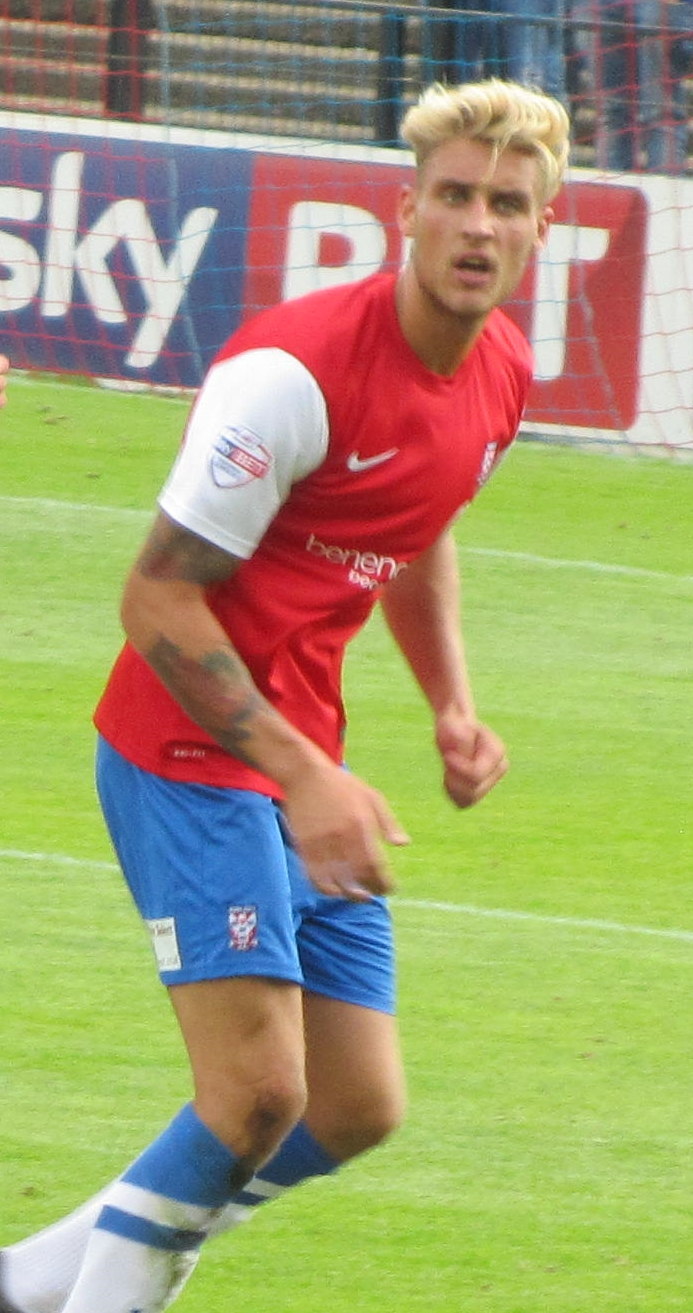
Taft playing for York City in 2013

Born in Leicester, Leicestershire, Taft started his career at Leicester City in their youth academy. He signed a professional contract with Leicester on 17 March 2011, tying him to the club until June 2013. To gain first-team experience, Taft was loaned out to Conference Premier club Kettering Town in August 2011 and after playing seven times had his loan spell extended by a month. He returned to Leicester in October 2011 having completed the loan with 14 appearances for Kettering. His first involvement with the Leicester first team was as an unused substitute against Nottingham Forest in an FA Cup third round tie which ended 0–0 on 7 January 2012. In the replay he was also an unused substitute, when Leicester won 4–0.

Taft went on loan to Swedish club Karlstad BK in Division 1 Södra in March 2012. He made 12 appearances, returning to Leicester in July 2012. At the end of the 2012–13 season, Taft signed a one-year contract extension with Leicester. On 29 August 2013, Taft joined League Two club York City on a one-month loan, and made his debut two days later in the a 2–1 away defeat to Exeter City. Having made three appearances for York, he was sent back to Leicester on 23 September 2013 after falling behind David McGurk, Daniel Parslow and Chris Smith in the pecking order for a central defensive berth. Taft was released by Leicester on 9 May 2014, following the club's promotion to the Premier League for 2014–15.

=== Burton Albion ===
Taft signed for League Two club Burton Albion on 30 May 2014 on a two-year contract. He made his debut for the club in a 1–0 away win over Oxford United. From that on in the first half of the season, Taft played regularly until he tore his hamstring during a 4–3 defeat to Carlisle United, which kept him out for six to eight weeks. Taft made his return on 17 November 2014, where he came on as a substitute for Stuart Beavon in the last minutes, in a 3–1 win over Wycombe Wanderers. Coincidentally, it was also Jimmy Floyd Hasselbaink's first match in charge.

On 3 January 2015, Taft scored the first goal of his professional career with a half volley from 12 yards in Burton's 1–0 home victory against promotion rivals Shrewsbury Town. Burton manager Hasselbaink praised Taft saying "George took his goal very well." He dedicated his goal to Richard Mayne, a victim who lost his life in Malaysia Airlines Flight 17. Taft helped the club earn promotion to League One for the first time in its history. In the 2014–15 season, Taft made 34 appearances for Burton and scored once. At the club's award ceremony, Taft was named the club's player in the community.

On 31 July 2015, Taft joined League Two club Cambridge United on a six-month loan. He returned to Burton on 29 October 2015 after tearing his anterior cruciate ligament in a league match against Yeovil Town.

=== Mansfield Town and Cambridge United ===
Taft signed for League Two club Mansfield Town on 26 May 2016 on a free transfer. On 31 August 2017, he returned to Cambridge United on loan until January 2018. Taft rejoined Cambridge on 29 January 2018 on loan for the rest of the 2017–18 season, following an injury to Leon Legge. He was released by Mansfield at the end of 2017–18.

Taft signed for League Two club Cambridge United permanently on 30 May 2018 on a two-year contract.

=== Bolton Wanderers ===
On 20 July 2020, Taft joined Bolton Wanderers on a two-year deal. His debut came on 5 September in Bolton's first match of the season, a 1–2 home defeat against Bradford in the first round of the EFL Cup.

==== Scunthorpe United (loan) ====
On 6 January 2021, Taft joined League Two side Scunthorpe United on loan for the remainder of the 2020/21 season.

=== Scunthorpe United ===
On 31 January, Taft joined Scunthorpe on a permanent basis.

He was released following Scunthorpe's relegation to the National League North at the end of the 2022–23 season.

=== Worksop Town ===
On 28 August 2023, Taft signed for Northern Premier League Premier Division club Worksop Town.

=== Mickleover ===
In May 2024, Taft joined Northern Premier League Premier Division side Mickleover.

In October 2024, Taft retired from football.

== International career ==
At international level, Taft represented England at under-18 level one time and scored in his only appearance against Poland on 16 November 2010. He made his debut for the under-19 team against Germany on 9 February 2011, and earned a total of five caps at this level. He was named in the under-20 squad for the 2011 FIFA U-20 World Cup but did not make any appearances.

== Style of play ==
Though primarily a centre back, Taft can also play as a left back. After signing for Burton Albion, manager Gary Rowett praised him for his height. After being promoted from the junior to the senior team of Leicester City, manager Sven-Göran Eriksson said "This is great news. They are very talented young footballers and we have the belief that they will progress." During his loan spell with Kettering Town, he was both played as a centre back and a left back.

== Career statistics ==
As of 23 October 2024

Appearances and goals by club, season and competition
Club	Season	League			FA Cup		League Cup		Other		Total	
Club	Season	Division	Apps	Goals	Apps	Goals	Apps	Goals	Apps	Goals	Apps	Goals
Leicester City	2011–12	Championship	0	0	0	0	0	0	—		0	0
Leicester City	2012–13	Championship	0	0	0	0	0	0	0	0	0	0
Leicester City	2013–14	Championship	0	0	0	0	0	0	—		0	0
Leicester City	Total		0	0	0	0	0	0	0	0	0	0
Kettering Town (loan)	2011–12	Conference Premier	14	0	—		—		—		14	0
Karlstad BK (loan)	2012	Division 1 Södra	12	0	—		—		—		12	0
York City (loan)	2013–14	League Two	3	0	—		—		—		3	0
Burton Albion	2014–15	League Two	30	1	0	0	3	0	1 (Note: Appearance in Football League Trophy)	0	34	1
Burton Albion	2015–16	League One	0	0	0	0	—		—		0	0
Burton Albion	Total		30	1	0	0	3	0	1	0	34	1
Cambridge United (loan)	2015–16	League Two	11	1	—		1	0	1	0	13	1
Mansfield Town	2016–17	League Two	13	0	0	0	0	0	1 (Note: Appearance(s) in EFL Trophy)	0	14	0
Mansfield Town	2017–18	League Two	0	0	—		0	0	1	0	1	0
Mansfield Town	Total		13	0	0	0	0	0	2	0	15	0
Cambridge United (loan)	2017–18	League Two	28	1	1	0	—		—		29	1
Cambridge United	2018–19	League Two	37	2	1	0	1	0	2	0	41	2
Cambridge United	2019–20	League Two	27	1	1	0	1	0	1	0	30	1
Cambridge United	Total		92	4	3	0	2	0	3	0	100	4
Bolton Wanderers	2020–21	League Two	1	0	0	0	1	0	3	0	5	0
Scunthorpe United (loan)	2020–21	League Two	5	0	0	0	0	0	0	0	5	0
Scunthorpe United	2020–21	League Two	11	0	0	0	0	0	0	0	11	0
Scunthorpe United	2021–22	League Two	34	1	1	0	1	0	1	0	37	1
Scunthorpe United	2022–23	National League	26	1	0	0	—		1 (Note: Appearance(s) in FA Trophy)	0	27	1
Scunthorpe United	Total		76	2	1	0	1	0	2	0	80	2
Worksop Town	2023–24	Northern Premier League Premier Division	24	1	6	0	—		5 (Note: One appearance in FA Trophy, three appearances in Sheffield & Hallamshire Senior Cup, one appearance in Northern Premier League Premier Division play-offs)	0	35	1
Mickleover	2024–25	Northern Premier League Premier Division	9	1	2	0	—		1	0	12	1
Career total			285	10	12	0	8	0	18	0	332	10

== Honours ==
Burton Albion

- Football League Two: 2014–15
