= Reggie Lambe =

Bermudian footballer (born 1991)

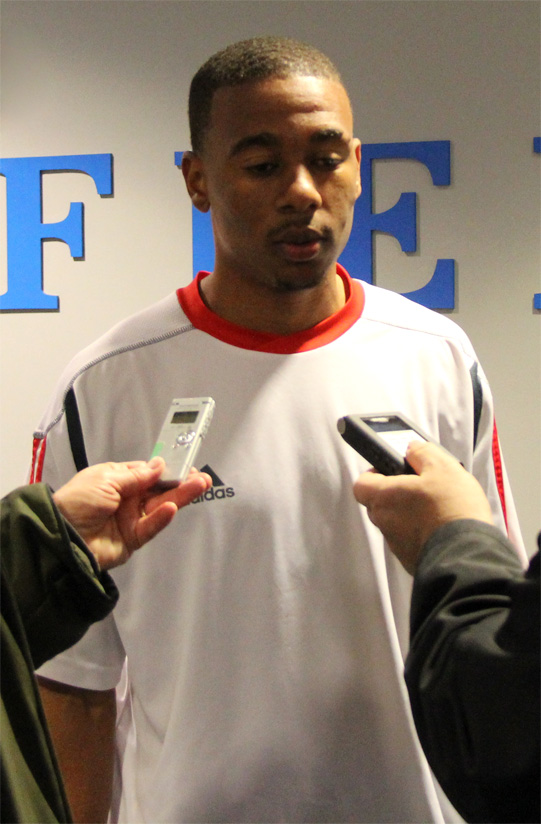
- Lambe in 2012

Personal information
- Full name: Reginald Everard Vibart Thompson-Lambe
- Date of birth: 4 February 1991 (age 35)
- Place of birth: Hamilton, Bermuda
- Height: 1.71 m (5 ft 7 in)
- Position: Midfielder

Team information
- Current team: Ipswich Wanderers

Youth career
- Dandy Town Hornets
- 2007–2009: Ipswich Town

Senior career*
Years	Team	Apps	(Gls)
2009–2011	Ipswich Town	2	(0)
2011	→ Bristol Rovers (loan)	7	(0)
2011–2013	Toronto FC	54	(5)
2013	Toronto FC II	3	(0)
2014	Nyköpings BIS	11	(1)
2014–2016	Mansfield Town	67	(10)
2016–2018	Carlisle United	72	(12)
2018–2020	Cambridge United	55	(5)
2020–2023	Stowmarket Town	30	(9)
2023	AFC Sudbury	14	(4)
2023–2024	Braintree Town	47	(2)
2024–2026	Needham Market	70	(7)
2026–	Ipswich Wanderers	16	(4)

International career^{‡}
- Bermuda U15
- Bermuda U20
2007–	Bermuda	63	(14)
- * Club domestic league appearances and goals as of 18:54, 21 November 2026 (UTC) ‡ National team caps and goals as of 19:00, 15 October 2025 (UTC)

Reginald Everard Vibart Thompson-Lambe (born 4 February 1991), known as Reggie Lambe, is a Bermudian footballer who plays as a midfielder for Eastern Counties League Premier Division club Ipswich Wanderers.

Lambe is a Bermudian national team player, making his first appearance at age 16 against St Kitts and Nevis in December 2007, and holds the record for the most caps for Bermuda.

== Club career ==
Lambe began his professional career with Ipswich Town, joining from Bermudian club Dandy Town Hornets, playing on the youth team and eventually joining the reserve squad, as well as making a first team appearance in a League Cup match against Shrewsbury Town. Lambe made his league debut in Ipswich Town's victory over Middlesbrough at Riverside Stadium on 7 August 2010, replacing Carlos Edwards in the 64th minute. The game ended in a 3–1 win for Ipswich Town.

Lambe joined Bristol Rovers on loan on 24 March 2011. While with Rovers Lambe made seven league appearances.

Lambe signed with Canadian club Toronto FC, of Major League Soccer (MLS), on 7 December 2011. Lambe scored his first goal(s) for Toronto in league play, scoring twice against Chicago Fire on 21 April, the game ended in a 3–2 home defeat. Lambe helped Toronto win the 2012 Canadian Championship with two goals, tying him with three other players for the Canadian Championship Golden Boot. He was put on waivers by Toronto FC on 5 March 2014.

After being waived by Toronto FC, Lambe joined Nyköpings BIS of Sweden's Division 1 Norra. Over three months, Lambe made twelve appearances for the club, scoring one goal before leaving. After leaving Nyköping, Lambe had a short trial with Mansfield Town before officially signing for the club for the 2014–15 season on 17 September 2014. Three days later, Lambe was named to the lineup as a substitute for Mansfield Town's league match against Carlisle United. Lambe went on to debut for the club in the match, coming on as a 74th-minute substitute for Fergus Bell.

Lambe joined League Two rivals Carlisle United in June 2016. He scored on his debut in a 1–1 draw with Portsmouth on 6 August 2016.

At the end of the 2017–18 season he was released by Carlisle.

On 28 June 2018 Lambe joined League Two club Cambridge United on a two-year contract. He scored his first goal for Cambridge in a 3–1 EFL Trophy loss to Southend United on 4 September 2018.

In 2020 Lambe signed for Stowmarket Town. Lambe scored on his debut in a 5–0 FA Vase win over Eynesbury Rovers. He left to join AFC Sudbury in February 2023.

On 29 June 2023, Lambe agreed to join National League South side, Braintree Town following a successful promotion campaign with AFC Sudbury. On 6 May 2024, he scored the winner with a diving header in the second half of extra time as Braintree defeated Worthing 4–3 to earn promotion to the National League.

On 27 September 2024, Lambe joined National League North side Needham Market.

In June 2026, Lambe joined Eastern Counties Premier Division club Ipswich Wanderers.

== International career ==
After representing Bermuda's under-15's, Lambe made his first full international appearance for Bermuda as a 16-year-old against St Kitts and Nevis in December 2007.

On 30 August 2008, Lambe scored four goals for his national team, in a 7–0 defeat of Saint Martin; a Digicel Cup match. These were his first goals for his country.

In May 2019 Lambe was named to the 2019 CONCACAF Gold Cup squad ahead of Bermuda's first ever participation at the tournament. In June 2022 he became Bermuda's most-capped player when he made his forty-fourth appearance for the national team.

== Career statistics ==
=== Club ===
As of end of 2025–26 season

Appearances and goals by club, season and competition
Club	Season	League			National cup		League cup		Other		Total	
Club	Season	Division	Apps	Goals	Apps	Goals	Apps	Goals	Apps	Goals	Apps	Goals
Ipswich Town	2009–10	Championship	0	0	0	0	1	0	—		1	0
Ipswich Town	2010–11	Championship	2	0	0	0	3	0	—		5	0
Ipswich Town	Total		2	0	0	0	4	0	0	0	6	0
Bristol Rovers (loan)	2011–12	League One	7	0	0	0	0	0	0	0	7	0
Toronto FC	2012	Major League Soccer	27	2	4	2	—		3 (Note: Appearances in CONCACAF Champions League)	0	34	4
Toronto FC	2013	Major League Soccer	27	0	1	0	—		3	2	31	2
Toronto FC	Total		54	2	5	2	0	0	6	2	65	6
Toronto FC II	2013	United Soccer League	3	1	0	0	—		0	0	3	1
Nyköping	2014	Division 1 Norra	11	1	0	0	—		0	0	11	1
Mansfield Town	2014–15	League Two	30	5	4	0	0	0	0	0	34	5
Mansfield Town	2015–16	League Two	37	5	1	0	1	0	0	0	39	5
Mansfield Town	Total		67	10	5	0	1	0	0	0	73	10
Carlisle United	2016–17	League Two	38	6	2	1	1	0	6 (Note: Four appearances and one goal in EFL Trophy, two appearances in EFL League Two play-offs)	1	47	8
Carlisle United	2017–18	League Two	34	6	5	0	2	0	2 (Note: Appearance(s) in EFL Trophy)	0	43	6
Carlisle United	Total		72	12	7	1	3	0	8	1	90	14
Cambridge United	2018–19	League Two	32	3	1	0	1	0	2	1	36	4
Cambridge United	2019–20	League Two	23	2	1	0	2	0	1	0	27	2
Cambridge United	Total		55	5	2	0	3	0	3	1	63	6
Stowmarket Town	2020–21	Eastern Counties League Premier Division	0	0	0	0	—		2 (Note: Appearance(s) in FA Vase)	2	2	2
Stowmarket Town	2021–22	Isthmian League North Division	22	7	0	0	—		1 (Note: Appearance(s) in Isthmian League North Division play-offs)	0	23	7
Stowmarket Town	2022–23	Isthmian League North Division	9	4	2	2	—		0	0	11	6
Stowmarket Town	Total		30	9	2	2	—		3	2	35	13
AFC Sudbury	2022–23	Isthmian League North Division	13	3	0	0	—		1	1	14	4
Braintree Town	2023–24	National League South	41	2	2	0	—		3 (Note: Appearance(s) in National League South play-offs)	1	46	3
Braintree Town	2024–25	National League	6	0	0	0	—		0	0	6	0
Braintree Town	Total		47	2	2	0	0	0	3	1	52	3
Needham Market	2024–25	National League North	34	4	0	0	—		0	0	34	4
Needham Market	2025–26	Southern League Premier Division Central	36	3	2	0	—		3 (Note: One appearance in FA Trophy, two appearances and two goals in Suffolk Premier Cup)	2	41	5
Needham Market	Total		70	7	2	0	0	0	3	2	75	9
Career total			431	50	25	5	11	0	27	9	494	64

=== International ===
As of match played 15 October 2024

Appearances and goals by national team and year
National team	Year	Apps	Goals
Bermuda	2007	1	0
Bermuda	2008	8	4
Bermuda	2011	4	0
Bermuda	2012	2	0
Bermuda	2015	4	0
Bermuda	2016	4	1
Bermuda	2017	4	0
Bermuda	2018	5	4
Bermuda	2019	8	0
Bermuda	2020	1	0
Bermuda	2021	2	1
Bermuda	2022	3	0
Bermuda	2023	6	0
Bermuda	2024	6	2
Bermuda	2025	5	2
Total		63	14

Scores and results list Bermuda's goal tally first, score column indicates score after each Lambe goal.

List of international goals scored by Reggie Lambe
No.	Date	Venue	Opponent	Score	Result	Competition
1	30 August 2008	Truman Bodden Stadium, George Town, Cayman Islands	Saint Martin	1–0	7–0	2008 Caribbean Cup qualification
2	30 August 2008	Truman Bodden Stadium, George Town, Cayman Islands	Saint Martin	3–0	7–0	2008 Caribbean Cup qualification
3	30 August 2008	Truman Bodden Stadium, George Town, Cayman Islands	Saint Martin	4–0	7–0	2008 Caribbean Cup qualification
4	30 August 2008	Truman Bodden Stadium, George Town, Cayman Islands	Saint Martin	5–0	7–0	2008 Caribbean Cup qualification
5	16 March 2016	Bermuda National Stadium, Hamilton, Bermuda	French Guiana	2–1	2–1	2017 Caribbean Cup qualification
6	21 March 2018	Sir Vivian Richards Stadium, North Sound, Antigua and Barbuda	Antigua and Barbuda	2–3	2–3	Friendly
7	12 October 2018	Bermuda National Stadium, Hamilton, Bermuda	Sint Maarten	1–0	12–0	2019–20 CONCACAF Nations League qualifying
8	12 October 2018	Bermuda National Stadium, Hamilton, Bermuda	Sint Maarten	3–0	12–0	2019–20 CONCACAF Nations League qualifying
9	12 October 2018	Bermuda National Stadium, Hamilton, Bermuda	Sint Maarten	11–0	12–0	2019–20 CONCACAF Nations League qualifying
10	2 July 2021	DRV PNK Stadium, Fort Lauderdale, United States	Barbados	3–0	8–1	2021 CONCACAF Gold Cup qualification
11	7 September 2024	ABFA Technical Center, Piggotts, Antigua and Barbuda	Dominican Republic	2–1	2–3	2024–25 CONCACAF Nations League B
12	16 November 2024	Estadio Cibao FC, Santiago de los Caballeros, Dominican Republic	Antigua and Barbuda	2–0	2–1	2024–25 CONCACAF Nations League B
13	4 June 2025	Bermuda National Stadium, Hamilton, Bermuda	Cayman Islands	4–0	5–0	2026 FIFA World Cup qualification
14	10 June 2025	Estadio Antonio Maceo, Santiago de Cuba, Cuba	Cuba	2–1	2–1	2026 FIFA World Cup qualification

== Honours ==
Toronto FC

- Canadian Championship: 2012

Braintree Town

- National League South play-offs: 2024

Individual

- Canadian Championship Golden Boot: 2012 (shared)
