= Gary Deegan =

Irish footballer (born 1987)

Personal information
- Full name: Gary Richard Deegan
- Date of birth: 28 September 1987 (age 39)
- Place of birth: Dublin, Ireland
- Height: 1.76 m (5 ft 9 in)
- Position: Midfielder

Youth career
- Shelbourne

Senior career*
Years	Team	Apps	(Gls)
2006	Shelbourne	0	(0)
2006	→ Kilkenny City (loan)	18	(4)
2007	Longford Town	30	(3)
2008	Galway United	17	(0)
2008–2009	Bohemians	35	(5)
2010–2012	Coventry City	42	(5)
2012–2013	Hibernian	20	(0)
2013–2014	Northampton Town	27	(1)
2014–2016	Southend United	47	(0)
2016–2017	Shrewsbury Town	40	(0)
2017–2019	Cambridge United	83	(1)
2020	Shelbourne	18	(3)
2021–2024	Drogheda United	121	(1)
Total		498	(23)
- * Club domestic league appearances and goals as of 23:46, 25 February 2025 (GMT)

Gary Richard Deegan (born 28 September 1987) is an Irish former professional footballer who played as a midfielder. Beginning his career in his native Ireland, he played in the Scottish Premiership for Hibernian and various clubs in all three divisions of the English Football League.

== Career ==
=== Ireland ===
Deegan started his career with Shelbourne. He made one competitive appearance for their first team, as a second-half substitute in a UEFA Intertoto Cup game against FK Vetra of Lithuania at Tolka Park on 24 June 2006, a match Shelbourne comfortably won 4–0. Soon after, Deegan was sent on loan to First Division strugglers Kilkenny City in July 2006 to gain experience and regular first team football.

Deegan left Shelbourne during the winter of 2006 following their financial meltdown and subsequently joined Longford Town in February 2007. Deegan immediately broke into Longford's starting XI, making 35 league and cup appearances over the course of the season while scoring 3 goals. Following a difficult season on and off the pitch, Longford were relegated to the First Division, but Deegan helped Longford to the 2007 FAI Cup Final, which he missed due to a suspension. Deegan signed for Galway United on a full-time basis on 24 January 2008, but was released on 9 July due to financial difficulties at Galway.

Deegan was not to stay out of football for long as Pat Fenlon swooped to sign Deegan for Dublin club Bohemians until the end of the 2008 season. He made his debut for the Gypsies in a 3–0 win over Cobh Ramblers at Dalymount Park on 1 August. He scored his first goal for the club in a 2–0 win over former club Galway on 22 August. Deegan made himself a regular in the Bohs' starting XI and his tremendous form was rewarded when he was named the Soccer Writers Association of Ireland (SWAI) Player of the Month for September. The good times continued as a 2–1 win over Drogheda United secured the league title for Bohemians and a winners medal for Deegan. Deegan's outstanding form was rewarded when he was voted on to the Eircom League of Ireland Premier Division Team for 2008, receiving 28% of the votes for the centre midfield position.

Deegan began the 2009 season well for Bohs with some powerful performances in midfield. He also excelled in Bohs UEFA Champions League qualifying tie against Red Bull Salzburg. However Deegan and Bohs would depart that competition, cruelly losing 2–1 on aggregate. Worse was to come for Deegan as he got sent off twice in the space of three weeks and served a lengthy suspension. However, he returned for the final games of the season and picked up his second League of Ireland winners medal as Bohs pipped deadly rivals Shamrock Rovers to the title by four points. Deegan's talent was rewarded at the season's end when he was voted on to the 2009 PFAI Team of the Year.

=== Coventry City ===
It was announced on 21 December 2009 that Deegan would be signing for English Championship club Coventry City on 4 January 2010 on a three-and-a-half-year deal. Deegan made his debut for Coventry as a second-half substitute against Barnsley on 9 January 2010. He scored his first goal for Coventry on his second start for the club against Queens Park Rangers in a 1–0 win for Coventry on 13 February 2010. His second goal for the club was a late equaliser in the M69 derby on 21 March 2010, with the match finishing 2–2.

During the 2010–11 pre-season Deegan suffered a stress fracture of the ankle, putting him out of action for the duration of the season, only to come on as a substitute in the final game of the season in a 2–2 draw against Norwich City. In 2012 Deegan was the subject of controversy after tweeting a pro-IRA slogan. He was banned for two weeks by the club, pending the outcome of an internal investigation.

=== Hibernian ===
Deegan signed for Hibernian, managed by Pat Fenlon (which the pair worked together at Bohemians), in August 2012 on a one-year deal. After joining, Fenlon said that he believed Deegan would become a fan favourite at the club. Deegan made his debut, making his first start and playing 90 minutes, in a 1–1 draw against Edinburgh derby rivals Heart of Midlothian. He helped the club improve its form in the early part of the 2012–13 season, but Deegan then suffered a broken jaw when he was the victim of an unprovoked attack in Edinburgh city centre. Deegan resumed training exercises in late November. A 27-year-old man was charged with assault in connection with the incident in December. Deegan said that his injury left him only able to eat soup for five weeks. Deegan made his return, coming on as a substitute, in a 3–2 loss against Motherwell on 15 December 2012. Deegan scored his first Hibs goal with a 30-yard strike in the fifth round of the Scottish Cup in a 1–0 victory over Aberdeen. He left Hibs at the end of his contract, after failing to secure a regular first team place.

=== Northampton Town ===
On 25 July 2013, Deegan joined Northampton Town on a one-year deal after a successful trial.

=== Southend United ===
Deegan joined Southend United on 22 August 2014 on a free transfer. He made his début for the club against AFC Wimbledon and throughout the 2014–15 season established himself as a favourite among the fans due to the commitment and passion that he displayed on the pitch as well as his iconic beard.

On 4 August 2015 Deegan signed a one-year contract with an option for a second year.

In May 2016, Deegan had his contract extended after the clause was triggered, although the following day, Southend announced that his contract had been terminated by mutual consent after Deegan wanted manager Phil Brown to guarantee him first team football, which Brown refused to do.

=== Shrewsbury Town ===
After leaving Southend, Deegan joined fellow League One side Shrewsbury Town. Despite being a first-team regular under Micky Mellon and his successor Paul Hurst as Shrewsbury avoided relegation, he was transfer-listed halfway through his two-year contract at the club, although Hurst commented "he's a man and true to his word... there's been no falling-out". Deegan left the club by mutual consent on 31 May 2017.

=== Cambridge United ===
Deegan signed a two-year contract at League Two side Cambridge United on 1 June 2017, following his departure from Shrewsbury Town the previous day.

He was offered a new contract by Cambridge United at the end of the 2018–19 season.

In July 2019 it was announced that he was suffering from blood poisoning.

=== Return To Shelbourne ===
Deegan signed a contract at League of Ireland Premier Division side Shelbourne, the club where he started his senior career, on 31 December 2019, following his departure from Cambridge United just minutes after it was announced both parties had agreed to terminate Deegan's contract. He scored 3 goals in 18 league appearances as Shelbourne were relegated from the Premier Division after just one season back in the top flight. His contract ran out and he was released by the club in October 2020.

=== Drogheda United ===
==== 2021 season ====
On 12 December 2020, Deegan signed a one-year deal with League of Ireland First Division champions and newly promoted Premier Division outfit Drogheda United under manager Tim Clancy, a former teammate of Deegan's at Hibernian. He featured in 32 of the club's 36 league games throughout the season, playing 2,787 minutes in total, and was nominated for the SSE Airtricity Player of the Month award in May.

==== 2022 season ====
After finishing in 7th place and avoiding relegation, Deegan signed a one-year contract extension at the club for the 2022 season, under new manager Kevin Doherty, who was previously assistant manager under Tim Clancy and another former teammate of Deegan's during their time together at Longford Town. He scored his first goal for the club against UCD on 4 March 2022. On 27 May, in the absence of Dane Massey, he was given the captain's armband for the first time as Drogheda drew 1–1 away to Bohemians. In August 2022, he received another nomination for SSE Airtricity Player of the Month. Deegan served 3 suspensions for bookings, but still managed 35 appearances throughout the season as Drogheda avoided relegation by finishing in 8th place.

==== 2023 season ====
On 9 December 2022, Deegan signed a new contract with the club, being named as club captain for the 2023 season. He received a straight red card for a late challenge in the Louth Derby against Dundalk on 29 April, a game which Drogheda would go on to narrowly lose 3–2. Deegan made his 100th appearance for Drogheda United in a 0–0 home draw against his former club Bohemians on 22 September. He played a total of 38 games in 2023, accumulating 3,381 total minutes on the pitch, and only missed 2 out of 36 league games.

==== 2024 season ====
On 10 November 2024, Deegan was part of the squad that beat Derry City 2–0 in the 2024 FAI Cup final at the Aviva Stadium in what was his final match in professional football as he retired at the end of the season.

== Career statistics ==
As of match played 10 November 2024

Club	Season	League	League		National Cup (Note: Includes FAI Cup, Scottish Cup & FA Cup)		League Cup (Note: Includes League of Ireland Cup, Scottish League Cup & EFL Cup)		Other		Total	
Club	Season	League	Apps	Goals	Apps	Goals	Apps	Goals	Apps	Goals	Apps	Goals
Shelbourne	2006	League of Ireland Premier Division	0	0	0	0	0	0	1 (Note: Appearance in the UEFA Intertoto Cup)	0	1	0
Kilkenny City (loan)	2006	League of Ireland First Division	18	4	—		—		—		18	4
Longford Town	2007	League of Ireland Premier Division	30	3	4	0	1	0	—		35	3
Galway United	2008	League of Ireland Premier Division	17	0	0	0	2	0	—		19	0
Bohemians	2008	League of Ireland Premier Division	13	3	4	1	—		—		17	4
Bohemians	2009	League of Ireland Premier Division	23	2	4	0	1	0	2 (Note: Appearances in the UEFA Champions League)	0	30	2
Bohemians	Total		36	5	8	1	1	0	2	0	47	6
Coventry City	2009–10	Championship	17	2	0	0	−		−		17	2
Coventry City	2010–11	Championship	1	0	0	0	0	0	−		1	0
Coventry City	2011–12	Championship	24	3	1	0	0	0	−		25	3
Coventry City	Total		42	5	1	0	0	0	−		43	5
Hibernian	2012–13	Scottish Premiership	20	0	2	1	1	0	−		23	1
Northampton Town	2013–14	League Two	27	1	1	0	1	0	1 (Note: Appearance(s) in the EFL Trophy)	0	30	1
Southend United	2014–15	League Two	22	0	1	0	0	0	3 (Note: 1 appearance in the EFL Trophy & 2 appearances in the EFL League Two play-offs)	0	26	0
Southend United	2015–16	League One	25	0	0	0	1	0	1	0	27	0
Southend United	Total		47	0	1	0	1	0	4	0	53	0
Shrewsbury Town	2016–17	League One	40	0	3	0	2	0	3	0	48	0
Cambridge United	2017–18	League Two	42	0	0	0	1	0	1	0	44	0
Cambridge United	2018–19	League Two	41	1	1	0	1	0	2	0	45	1
Cambridge United	2019–20	League Two	0	0	0	0	0	0	0	0	0	0
Cambridge United	Total		83	1	1	0	2	0	3	0	89	1
Shelbourne	2020	League of Ireland Premier Division	18	3	2	0	—		0 (Note: Appearances in the League of Ireland promotion/relegation play-off)	0	20	3
Drogheda United	2021	League of Ireland Premier Division	32	0	1	0	—		—		33	0
Drogheda United	2022	League of Ireland Premier Division	33	1	2	0	—		—		35	1
Drogheda United	2023	League of Ireland Premier Division	34	0	3	0	–		1 (Note: Appearances in the Leinster Senior Cup)	0	38	0
Drogheda United	2024	League of Ireland Premier Division	22	0	3	0	–		3	0	28	0
Drogheda United	Total		121	1	9	0	—		4	0	134	1
Career total			499	24	32	2	11	0	18	0	560	25

== Honours ==
=== Club ===
Galway United

- Connacht Senior Cup: 2008

Bohemians

- League of Ireland Premier Division: 2008, 2009
- FAI Cup: 2008

Southend United

- Football League Two play-offs: 2015

Drogheda United

- FAI Cup: 2024

=== Individual ===
- PFAI Premier Division Team of the Year: 2009
- Drogheda United Club Player of the Year: 2022
- Drogheda United Supporters Player of the Year: 2022
