= 2018–19 Cambridge United F.C. season =

Cambridge United
2018–19 season
- Manager: Joe Dunne (until 1 December); Colin Calderwood (since 19 December)
- Stadium: Abbey Stadium
- League Two: 21st
- FA Cup: First round
- EFL Cup: First round
- EFL Trophy: Second round
Home colours	Away colours	Third colours

The 2018–19 season is Cambridge United's 107th season in their history, their 40th in the Football League, and their fifth consecutive season in League Two. Along with League Two, the club will also participate in the FA Cup, EFL Cup and EFL Trophy.

The season covers the period from 1 July 2018 to 30 June 2019.

== Transfers ==
=== Transfers in ===
Date from	Position	Nationality	Name	From	Fee	Ref.
1 July 2018	CB	(England)	Louis John	Sutton United	Free transfer	
1 July 2018	RM	(Bermuda)	Reggie Lambe	Carlisle United	Free transfer	
1 July 2018	CB	(England)	George Taft	Mansfield Town	Free transfer	

=== Transfers out ===
Date from	Position	Nationality	Name	To	Fee	Ref.
1 July 2018	CM	(England)	Medy Elito	Barnet	Released	
1 July 2018	CF	(England)	Uche Ikpeazu	(Scotland) Heart of Midlothian	Free transfer	
1 July 2018	CB	(England)	Leon Legge	Port Vale	Free transfer	
1 July 2018	RM	(England)	Piero Mingoia	Accrington Stanley	Released	
2 January 2019	CF	(Republic of Ireland)	Barry Corr	Free agent	Released	
31 January 2019	RW	(England)	Ade Azeez	(Wales) Newport County	Undisclosed	P

=== Loans in ===
Start date	Position	Nationality	Name	From	End date	Ref.
11 January 2019	CF	(England)	Rushian Hepburn-Murphy	Aston Villa	31 May 2019	
25 January 2019	CF	(England)	Alex Jones	Bradford City	31 May 2019	
31 January 2019	LB	(England)	Hayden Coulson	Middlesbrough	31 May 2019	
31 January 2019	CM	(Republic of Ireland)	Jake Doyle-Hayes	Aston Villa	31 May 2019	

=== Loans out ===
Start date	Position	Nationality	Name	To	End date	Ref.
3 August 2018	CF	(England)	Matthew Foy	Chelmsford City	31 August 2018	
7 August 2018	GK	(England)	Finlay Iron	St Neots Town	September 2018	
10 August 2018	CM	(England)	Lee Watkins	Mildenhall Town	September 2018	
31 August 2018	CF	(England)	Matthew Foy	Kettering Town	September 2018	
28 September 2018	DM	(England)	Sam Squire	Needham Market	October 2018	
13 November 2018	CF	(England)	Tom Knowles	Hemel Hempstead Town	January 2019	
16 January 2019	FW	(England)	Sam Bennett	Mildenhall Town	February 2019	
18 January 2019	RB	(England)	Leon Davies	Bath City	February 2019	
18 January 2019	CB	(England)	Sam Goode	Haverhill Rovers	Work experience	
18 January 2019	CF	(England)	Tom Knowles	Kettering Town	February 2019	
18 January 2019	FW	(England)	Joe Neal	Royston Town	Work experience	
18 January 2019	MF	(England)	Ben Worman	Bishop's Stortford	March 2019	

== Competitions ==
=== Pre-season friendlies ===
Cambridge United announced they will face ten different opponents during their pre-season schedule. A scheduled friendly match with Billericay Town on 20 July was later cancelled.

7 July 2018 Friendly	St Neots Town	1–7	Cambridge United	St Neots
12:30 BST	Peters 45'	Report	Lewis 13'; Corr 43'; O'Neil 54'; Azeez 61'; Halliday 66'; Maris 89', 90'	Stadium: Rowley Park

10 July 2018 Friendly	Cambridge City	1–8	Cambridge United	St Ives
19:45 BST	Sharman	Report	Ibehre (x2); Knowles (x2); Deegan; Osadebe; Azeez (x2)	Stadium: Glasswood Stadium

12 July 2018 Friendly	Royston Town	0–4	Cambridge United	Royston
19:45 BST		Report	28' (o.g.); Azeez 52'; Lambe 58', 79'	Stadium: Garden Walk

14 July 2018 Friendly	Chelmsford City	1–4	Cambridge United	Chelmsford
15:00 BST		Report	Dunk; Azeez; Amoo (o.g.)	Stadium: Melbourne Stadium

21 July 2018 Friendly	Cambridge United	0–2	Millwall	Cambridge
15:00 BST		Report	Elliott 74'; O'Brien 82'	Stadium: Abbey Stadium; Attendance: 1,312

24 July 2018 Friendly	Ebbsfleet United	2–2	Cambridge United	Northfleet
19:45 BST	Kedwell 89'; Weston 90'	Report	Maris 40', 44'	Stadium: Stonebridge Road; Attendance: 414

25 July 2018 Friendly	Dagenham & Redbridge	0–2	Cambridge United	Dagenham
19:45 BST		Report	Azeez 10', 90' (pen.)	Stadium: Chigwell Construction Stadium

28 July 2018 Friendly	Bishop's Stortford	0–1	Cambridge United	Bishop's Stortford
15:00 BST				Stadium: ProKit UK Stadium

28 July 2018 Friendly	Newmarket Town	1-6	Cambridge United	Newmarket
15:00 BST				Stadium: Cricket Field

=== League Two ===
==== League table ====
Pos	Team	Pld	W	D	L	GF	GA	GD	Pts	Promotion, qualification or relegation
19	Crawley Town	46	15	8	23	51	68	−17	53	
20	Port Vale	46	12	13	21	39	55	−16	49	
21	Cambridge United	46	12	11	23	40	66	−26	47	
22	Macclesfield Town	46	10	14	22	48	74	−26	44	
23	Notts County (R)	46	9	14	23	48	84	−36	41	Relegation to the National League

Source: EFL Official Website
Rules for classification: 1) Points; 2) Goal difference; 3) Number of goals scored; 4) Head-to-head results
(R) Relegated

==== Results summary ====
Overall								Home						Away					
Pld	W	D	L	GF	GA	GD	Pts	W	D	L	GF	GA	GD	W	D	L	GF	GA	GD
46	12	11	23	40	66	−26	47	7	7	9	21	26	−5	5	4	14	19	40	−21

Last updated: 4 May 2019.
Source: BBC

==== Results by matchday ====
Matchday	1	2	3	4	5	6	7	8	9	10	11	12	13	14	15	16	17	18	19	20	21	22	23	24	25	26	27	28	29	30	31	32	33	34	35	36	37	38	39	40	41	42	43	44	45	46
Ground	A	H	A	H	H	A	H	A	H	A	H	A	H	A	A	H	H	A	H	A	A	H	A	H	H	A	H	A	H	A	H	H	A	A	A	H	H	A	H	A	A	H	H	A	H	A
Result	L	W	D	L	L	W	L	L	D	L	L	L	L	D	W	W	W	L	D	L	L	D	L	W	L	L	W	W	W	L	W	D	L	L	W	D	D	D	L	W	L	L	D	L	L	D
Position	22	15	17	19	21	17	19	19	19	20	23	23	23	23	21	20	19	21	21	21	22	22	22	22	22	22	21	20	19	20	19	18	19	19	19	19	20	20	21	19	20	20	21	21	21	21

Updated to match(es) played on 4 May 2019. Source: Statto.com
A = Away; H = Home; W = Win; D = Draw; L = Loss

==== Matches ====
On 21 June 2018, the League Two fixtures for the forthcoming season were announced.

4 August 2018 1	Port Vale	3–0	Cambridge United	Burslem
15:00 BST	Miller 45+2'; Pope 47' (pen.), 69'	Report		Stadium: Vale Park; Attendance: 5,559; Referee: Trevor Kettle

11 August 2018 2	Cambridge United	3–2	Notts County	Cambridge
15:00 BST	Azeez 46', 61'; Corr 90+1'	Report	Boldewijn 29'; Duffy 78'	Stadium: Abbey Stadium; Attendance: 4,372; Referee: Andy Haines

18 August 2018 3	Northampton Town	2–2	Cambridge United	Northampton
15:00 BST	van Veen 58', 76'	Report	Maris 70'; Deegan 86'	Stadium: Sixfields Stadium; Attendance: 5,047; Referee: Seb Stockbridge

21 August 2018 4	Cambridge United	0–2	Exeter City	Cambridge
19:45 BST		Report	Forte 8'; Stockley 14'	Stadium: Abbey Stadium; Attendance: 3,662; Referee: Craig Hicks

25 August 2018 5	Cambridge United	0–1	Cheltenham Town	Cambridge
15:00 BST		Report	Jones 66'	Stadium: Abbey Stadium; Attendance: 3,660; Referee: Matt Donohue

1 September 2018 6	Stevenage	0–1	Cambridge United	Stevenage
15:00 BST		Report	Amoo 17'	Stadium: Broadhall Way; Attendance: 2,998; Referee: Paul Marsden

8 September 2018 7	Cambridge United	1–2	Carlisle United	Cambridge
15:00 BST	Brown 23'	Report	Bennett 43'; Nadesan 69'	Stadium: Abbey Stadium; Attendance: 4,234; Referee: Ollie Yates

15 September 2018 8	Colchester United	3–0	Cambridge United	Colchester
15:00 BST	Szmodics 23'; Nouble 35'; Senior 80'	Report		Stadium: Colchester Community Stadium; Attendance: 4,108; Referee: Lee Swabey

22 September 2018 9	Cambridge United	1–1	Mansfield Town	Cambridge
15:00 BST	Maris 88'	Report	Rose 26'	Stadium: Abbey Stadium; Attendance: 3,909; Referee: Nick Kinseley

29 September 2018 10	Newport County	4–2	Cambridge United	Newport
15:00 BST	Demetriou 45+1' (pen.); Amond 49'; Matt 60', 63'	Report	Lambe 4', 21'	Stadium: Rodney Parade; Attendance: 3,104; Referee: Brett Huxtable

2 October 2018 11	Cambridge United	1–3	Forest Green Rovers	Cambridge
19:45 BST	Brown 21'; Carroll (red card) 76'	Report	Digby 34'; Grubb 55'; Worthington 88'	Stadium: Abbey Stadium; Attendance: 3,059; Referee: Charles Breakspear

6 October 2018 12	Crawley Town	2–0	Cambridge United	Crawley
15:00 BST	Payne (yellow card) 26'; Gambin 71'; Palmer 77'	Report	Lambe (yellow card) 26'; Maris (yellow card) 64'	Stadium: Broadfield Stadium; Attendance: 2,151; Referee: Gavin Ward

13 October 2018 13	Cambridge United	0–1	Milton Keynes Dons	Cambridge
15:00 BST		Report	Aneke 29'	Stadium: Abbey Stadium; Attendance: 5,106; Referee: Dean Whitestone

20 October 2018 14	Lincoln City	1–1	Cambridge United	Lincoln
15:00 BST	Rhead 6'; Chapman (red card) 21'	Report	Brown 11'	Stadium: Sincil Bank; Attendance: 9,108; Referee: Lee Collins

23 October 2018 15	Swindon Town	0–2	Cambridge United	Swindon
19:45 BST		Report	Lambe 11'; Brown 12'	Stadium: County Ground; Attendance: 5,824; Referee: Matt Donohue

27 October 2018 16	Cambridge United	1–0	Macclesfield Town	Cambridge
15:00 BST	Taylor (yellow card) 61'; Ibehre 80'	Report	Smith (yellow card) 72'	Stadium: Abbey Stadium; Attendance: 3,946; Referee: Craig Hicks

3 November 2018 17	Cambridge United	1–0	Grimsby Town	Cambridge
15:00 GMT	Lewis 83'	Report	Hall-Johnson (yellow card) 76'; Embleton (yellow card) 89'	Stadium: Abbey Stadium; Attendance: 4,096; Referee: Nick Kinseley

17 November 2018 18	Oldham Athletic	3–1	Cambridge United	Oldham
15:00 GMT	Edmundson 61'; Lyden 76'; Lang 80'	Report	Maris 7'	Stadium: Boundary Park; Attendance: 3,818; Referee: Anthony Backhouse

24 November 2018 19	Cambridge United	2–2	Bury	Cambridge
15:00 GMT	Lewis 39' (red card) 55'; Taylor 86'	Report	O'Shea 23'; Aimson 26'	Stadium: Abbey Stadium; Attendance: 3,846; Referee: Christopher Sarginson

27 November 2018 20	Crewe Alexandra	2–0	Cambridge United	Crewe
19:45 GMT	Ainley 34'; Miller 86'	Report		Stadium: Gresty Road; Attendance: 2,569; Referee: Tom Nield

8 December 2018 21	Tranmere Rovers	1–0	Cambridge United	Birkenhead
15:00 GMT	Norwood 77'	Report		Stadium: Prenton Park; Attendance: 5,016; Referee: Ollie Yates

15 December 2018 22	Cambridge United	0–0	Yeovil Town	Cambridge
15:00 GMT	Deegan (yellow card) 20'	Report	Santos (yellow card) 20'	Stadium: Abbey Stadium; Attendance: 3,807; Referee: Peter Wright

22 December 2018 23	Morecambe	3–0	Cambridge United	Morecambe
15:00 GMT	Yarney (yellow card) 37'; Oliver 66'; Cranston (yellow card) 74'; Tutte (yellow card) 87' (goal) 87'; Ellison 90+1'	Report	Darling (yellow card) 33'	Stadium: Globe Arena; Attendance: 1,439; Referee: Eddie Ilderton

26 December 2018 24	Cambridge United	2–1	Crawley Town	Cambridge
13:00 GMT	Maris 27' (yellow card) 32'; Deegan (yellow card) 38'; Ibehre 88'	Report	Poleon 16'; Bulman (yellow card) 80'; McNerney (yellow card) 86'	Stadium: Abbey Stadium; Attendance: 4,601; Referee: Neil Hair

29 December 2018 25	Cambridge United	1–2	Lincoln City	Cambridge
15:00 GMT	Ibehre 28'; Lambe (yellow card) 52'; Halliday (yellow card) 70'	Report	Akinde (yellow card) 39' (goal) 75'; Anderson (yellow card) 59'; Eardley 70'; Rhead (yellow card) 90'	Stadium: Abbey Stadium; Attendance: 6,858; Referee: Carl Boyeson

1 January 2019 26	Milton Keynes Dons	6–0	Cambridge United	Denbigh
15:00 GMT	Healey 5', 63'; Agard 7', 76' (pen.); Aneke 12'; Baudry (yellow card) 68'; Sow 85'	Report	O'Neil (yellow card) 62'; Halliday (yellow card) 86'	Stadium: Stadium mk Attendance: 8,128; Referee: Charles Breakspear

5 January 2019 27	Cambridge United	2–0	Stevenage	Cambridge
15:00 GMT	Lewis (yellow card) 28'; Amoo 35'; Deegan (yellow card) 42'; Brown 45+2'	Report	Cuthbert (yellow card) 66'; Timlin (yellow card) 82'; Nugent (yellow card) 90+2'	Stadium: Abbey Stadium; Attendance: 4,235; Referee: Trevor Kettle

12 January 2019 28	Notts County	0–1	Cambridge United	Nottingham
15:00 GMT		Report	Taylor 41'; Amoo (yellow card) 53'; Azeez (yellow card) 81'	Stadium: Meadow Lane; Attendance: 15,026; Referee: John Busby

19 January 2019 29	Cambridge United	3–2	Northampton Town	Cambridge
15:00 GMT	Brown 45+4'; Taft 64'; Amoo 90+4'	Report	Pierre 27'; Morias 48'	Stadium: Abbey Stadium; Attendance: 4,849; Referee: Martin Coy

26 January 2019 30	Exeter City	1–0	Cambridge United	Exeter
15:00 GMT	O'Shea (yellow card) 62'; Forte (penalty missed) 66'; Wilson (yellow card) 75'; Law 82'	Report		Stadium: St James Park; Attendance: 3,996; Referee: Graham Salisbury

2 February 2019 P	Cheltenham Town	P–P	Cambridge United	Cheltenham
15:00 GMT		Report		Stadium: Whaddon Road
Note: Fixture was postponed due to frozen areas of the pitch.

9 February 2019 31	Cambridge United	1–0	Port Vale	Cambridge
15:00 GMT	Amoo 19'; Brown (yellow card) 60'; Carroll (yellow card) 66'	Report	Kay (yellow card) 32'; Smith (yellow card) 90+1'	Stadium: Abbey Stadium; Attendance: 4,193; Referee: Seb Stockbridge

16 February 2019 32	Cambridge United	0–0	Tranmere Rovers	Cambridge
15:00 GMT	Halliday (yellow card) 88'	Report	Bakayogo (yellow card) 45+2'; Perkins (yellow card) 45+5'	Stadium: Abbey Stadium; Attendance: 4,872; Referee: Brett Huxtable

19 February 2019 33	Cheltenham Town	2–0	Cambridge United	Cheltenham
19:45 GMT	Taft 23' (o.g.); Thomas 58' (pen.); Tozer (yellow card) 73'; Waters (penalty missed) 82'	Report	Carroll (red card) 58'; Doyle-Hayes (yellow card) 82'	Stadium: Whaddon Road; Attendance: 2,339; Referee: Paul Marsden

23 February 2019 34	Yeovil Town	1–0	Cambridge United	Yeovil
15:00 GMT	Duffus 25'; Gafaiti (yellow card) 55'; Fisher (yellow card) 59'; Abrahams (yellow card) 90+3'; Baxter (yellow card) 90+5'	Report		Stadium: Huish Park; Attendance: 2,596; Referee: Graham Salisbury

2 March 2019 35	Grimsby Town	0–2	Cambridge United	Cleethorpes
15:00 GMT		Report	Taft 42'; Deegan (yellow card) 61'; Hepburn-Murphy (yellow card) 72' (goal) 82'	Stadium: Blundell Park; Attendance: 4,772; Referee: Scott Oldham

9 March 2019 36	Cambridge United	1–1	Oldham Athletic	Cambridge
15:00 GMT	Lambe (yellow card) 27'; Brown 46'; Dunk (yellow card) 50'	Report	Dunk 12' (o.g.); Maouche (yellow card) 72'; Clarke (yellow card) 89'	Stadium: Abbey Stadium; Attendance: 4,758; Referee: Kevin Johnson

12 March 2019 37	Cambridge United	0–0	Crewe Alexandra	Cambridge
19:45 GMT	Taft (yellow card) 65'	Report	Pickering (yellow card) 62'; Ray (yellow card) 67'; Green (yellow card) 78'	Stadium: Abbey Stadium; Attendance: 3,448; Referee: Charles Breakspear

16 March 2019 P	Bury	P–P	Cambridge United	Bury
15:00 GMT		Report		Stadium: Gigg Lane
Note: Fixture was postponed due to a waterlogged pitch.

23 March 2019 38	Carlisle United	2–2	Cambridge United	Carlisle
15:00 GMT	Devitt 37'; Thomas 45+1'; Jones (yellow card) 50'; Grainger (yellow card) 81'	Report	Hepburn-Murphy 3'; Ibehre 68'	Stadium: Brunton Park; Attendance: 4,673; Referee: Andy Haines

30 March 2019 39	Cambridge United	0–1	Colchester United	Cambridge
15:00 GMT	Carroll (yellow card) 42'	Report	Kent (yellow card) 62'; Stevenson (yellow card) 86'; Vincent-Young 90+6'	Stadium: Abbey Stadium; Attendance: 5,515; Referee: Darren Drysdale

2 April 2019 40	Bury	0–3	Cambridge United	Bury
19:45 BST		Report	Jones 16'; Amoo 34'; Maris 72'	Stadium: Gigg Lane; Attendance: 3,386; Referee: Antony Coggins

6 April 2019 41	Mansfield Town	1–0	Cambridge United	Mansfield
15:00 BST	Walker 64'; Benning (yellow card) 87'	Report		Stadium: Field Mill; Attendance: 4,789; Referee: Craig Hicks

13 April 2019 42	Cambridge United	0–3	Newport County	Cambridge
15:00 BST	Brown (yellow card) 48'	Report	Amond 4'; Matt 34'; Demetriou (yellow card) 88'; McKirdy 90'	Stadium: Abbey Stadium; Attendance: 4,294; Referee: Ross Joyce

19 April 2019 43	Cambridge United	0–0	Swindon Town	Cambridge
15:00 BST		Report	Dunne (yellow card) 78'	Stadium: Abbey Stadium; Attendance: 4,380; Referee: Brett Huxtable

22 April 2019 44	Forest Green Rovers	2–1	Cambridge United	Nailsworth
15:00 BST	Gunning 24'; Doidge 76'	Report	Lewis 66'; Knowles (yellow card) 87'	Stadium: The New Lawn; Attendance: 2,699; Referee: Thomas Bramall

27 April 2019 45	Cambridge United	1–2	Morecambe	Cambridge
15:00 BST	Brown (penalty missed) 42'; Deegan (yellow card) 85'; Knowles 90+2'	Report	Collins 9'; Lavelle (yellow card) 33'; Cranston (yellow card) 83' (goal) 87'	Stadium: Abbey Stadium; Attendance: 4,083; Referee: Nick Kinseley

4 May 2019 46	Macclesfield Town	1–1	Cambridge United	Macclesfield
12:30 BST	Durrell 66'; Smith (yellow card) 90'	Report	Lewis 44'; Coulson (yellow card) 73'	Stadium: Moss Rose; Referee: John Busby

=== FA Cup ===
The first round draw was made live on BBC by Dennis Wise and Dion Dublin on 22 October.

11 November 2018 First round	Guiseley	4–3	Cambridge United	Guiseley
12:45 GMT	Hatfield 25'; Moyo 40'; Felix 48'; James 55'	Report	Ibehre 65', 90+2'; Maris 89'	Stadium: Nethermoor Park; Attendance: 1,097; Referee: Trevor Kettle

=== EFL Cup ===
On 15 June 2018, the draw for the first round was made in Vietnam.

14 August 2018 First round	Cambridge United	1–4	Newport County	Cambridge
19:45 BST	Azeez 90' (pen.)	Report	Amond 18', 22'; Matt 49'; Semenyo 86'	Stadium: Abbey Stadium; Attendance: 1,618; Referee: Andy Davies

=== EFL Trophy ===
On 13 July 2018, the initial group stage draw bar the U21 invited clubs was announced. The draw for the second round was made live on Talksport by Leon Britton and Steve Claridge on 16 November.

Pos	Lge	Team	Pld	W	PW	PL	L	GF	GA	GD	Pts	Qualification
1	L2	Cambridge United	3	2	0	0	1	8	4	+4	6	Round 2
2	L1	Southend United	3	2	0	0	1	6	3	+3	6	Round 2
3	L2	Colchester United	3	1	0	0	2	3	5	−2	3	
4	ACA	Southampton U21	3	1	0	0	2	2	7	−5	3	

Source: EFL.com

4 September 2018 Group stages	Southend United	3–1	Cambridge United	Southend-on-Sea
19:45 BST	McCoulsky 55', 64'; Hutchinson 87'	Report	Lambe 53'	Stadium: Roots Hall; Attendance: 1,421; Referee: Gavin Ward

9 October 2018 Group stages	Cambridge United	4–0	Southampton U21	Cambridge
19:00 BST	Azeez 16' (pen.), 37', 88'; Brown 50'	Report		Stadium: Abbey Stadium; Attendance: 469

13 November 2018 Group stages	Cambridge United	3–1	Colchester United	Cambridge
19:00 GMT	Azeez 32', 81'; Osadebe 90+3'	Report	Pell 90+2'	Stadium: Abbey Stadium; Attendance: 598

4 December 2018 Second round	Cambridge United	1–1 (2–4 p)	Northampton Town	Cambridge
19:45 GMT	Maris 9'	Report	van Veen 89'	Stadium: Abbey Stadium; Attendance: 648
	Penalties
	Azeez (penalty missed); Brown (penalty missed); Amoo (penalty scored); Lambe (penalty scored)		van Veen (penalty scored); Taylor (penalty missed); Foley (penalty scored); Waters (penalty scored); McWilliams (penalty scored)
