= Paul Lewis (footballer) =

English footballer

Personal information
- Full name: Paul James Lewis
- Date of birth: 17 December 1994 (age 31)
- Place of birth: Liverpool, England
- Height: 6 ft 1 in (1.86 m)
- Position: Central midfielder

Team information
- Current team: Morecambe
- Number: 17

Youth career
- 2011–2013: Macclesfield Town

Senior career*
Years	Team	Apps	(Gls)
2013–2017	Macclesfield Town	94	(16)
2017–2020	Cambridge United	84	(9)
2017	→ Dover Athletic (loan)	6	(1)
2020–2021	Tranmere Rovers	40	(6)
2021–2022	Northampton Town	39	(6)
2022–2024	Tranmere Rovers	38	(2)
2024–	Morecambe	59	(1)

International career^{‡}
2015	England C	1	(0)
- * Club domestic league appearances and goals as of 20:03, 24 March 2025 (UTC) ‡ National team caps and goals as of 02:56, 24 November 2021 (UTC)

Paul James Lewis (born 17 December 1994) is an English footballer who plays as a central midfielder for National League North club Morecambe.

== Club career ==
=== Macclesfield Town ===
Having been promoted to the senior team in May 2013 by his former youth team manager John Askey, Lewis made his debut for Macclesfield Town on Tuesday 13 August 2013 against Lincoln City at Sincil Bank in a 1–0 defeat. He would only play sporadically from August to December, most notably scoring an injury time winner against Forest Green Rovers on 12 October 2013. Lewis would play more frequently from December until the end of the season, making 21 league appearances including 12 from the substitutes bench.

Lewis would begin the 2014–15 season as a regular starter in central midfield. In an FA Trophy fixture against Wrexham on 28 October, Lewis broke his collarbone within the first 15 seconds of the match. Prior to this injury, he had made 15 league appearances, scoring 3 goals including a winner against Dover Athletic on 18 October. This injury sidelined him until the middle of January, after which he would return to the playing squad in the final four months of the season. Macclesfield narrowly missed out on a place in the play-offs, finishing sixth. He finished the season with 27 league appearances and 4 goals

After signing a new one-year contract, Lewis would again start the season playing regularly. With the exception a one-month absence between September and October, he would continue to feature in the starting team through the rest of 2015. In a league match against Tranmere Rovers on 2 January 2016, he picked up a hamstring injury leading to him being substituted after 22 minutes. For the remainder of the season, Lewis would struggle for fitness and was unable to get a run of games in the Macclesfield team, featuring only four more times that season. Across the season he made 25 league appearances, scoring a career-best 5 goals in all competitions.

=== Cambridge United ===
On 13 January 2017, Lewis signed a three-and-a-half-year contract with League Two club Cambridge United for an undisclosed fee. He was an unused sub the following day in a 0–0 draw at home to Blackpool. He made his first appearance for the club a week later replacing Max Clark in the 72 minute with the score being 2–1 to Mansfield Town who would go on to win 3–1.

==== Dover Athletic (loan) ====
On 22 September 2017, Lewis joined Dover Athletic on loan going straight into the squad for the following day's away fixture to Guiseley. He did come on for Dover against Guiseley replacing goalscorer Nortei Nortey in a game that finished 1–1. He made his first start for the club the following week against Solihull Moors; setting up a late winner for Ryan Bird. The 1–0 victory sent Dover to the top of the league

=== Northampton Town ===
Lewis played for Northampton Town for the 2021/22 season before returning to Tranmere Rovers.

=== Tranmere Rovers ===
Lewis re-joined Tranmere in 2022. He was released at the end of the 2023–24 season.

=== Morecambe ===
Lewis was one of 15 free agents that signed for League Two club Morecambe on 12 July 2024, after the club's embargo on registering new players was lifted.

== International career ==
Lewis was called up to the England C squad to face the Cyprus U21 national team on 5 February 2015 along with teammate Andy Halls for a friendly match. He made his debut as a half-time substitute in a 2–1 defeat. As of August 2016, he has not had any further call-ups.

== Career statistics ==
As of end of 2023–24 season

Club	Season	League			FA Cup		League Cup		Other		Total	
Club	Season	Division	Apps	Goals	Apps	Goals	Apps	Goals	Apps	Goals	Apps	Goals
Macclesfield Town	2013–14	Conference Premier	21	1	1	0	---		0	0	22	1
Macclesfield Town	2014–15	Conference Premier	27	4	0	0	---		0	0	27	4
Macclesfield Town	2015–16	National League	25	5	1	0	---		0	0	26	5
Macclesfield Town	2016–17	National League	21	6	3	0	---		0	0	24	6
Macclesfield Town	Total		94	16	5	0	---		0	0	99	16
Cambridge United	2016–17	League Two	13	0	0	0	0	0	0	0	13	0
Cambridge United	2017–18	League Two	12	1	1	0	1	0	2	0	16	1
Cambridge United	2018–19	League Two	23	4	1	0	0	0	4	0	28	4
Cambridge United	2019–20	League Two	36	4	1	0	1	0	2	0	40	4
Cambridge United	Total		84	9	3	0	2	0	8	0	97	9
Dover Athletic (loan)	2017–18	National League	6	1	0	0	---		0	0	6	1
Tranmere Rovers	2020–21	League Two	40	6	3	0	1	0	9	1	53	7
Northampton Town	2021–22	League Two	39	6	2	1	2	0	0	0	43	7
Tranmere Rovers	2022–23	League Two	24	2	1	0	2	0	3	2	30	4
Tranmere Rovers	2023–24	League Two	14	0	1	0	1	0	2	0	18	0
Tranmere Rovers	Total		38	2	2	0	3	0	5	2	48	4
Career total			291	40	15	1	8	0	22	3	346	44

== Honours ==
Tranmere Rovers

- EFL Trophy runner-up: 2020–21
