= Greg Taylor (English footballer) =

English footballer (born 1990)

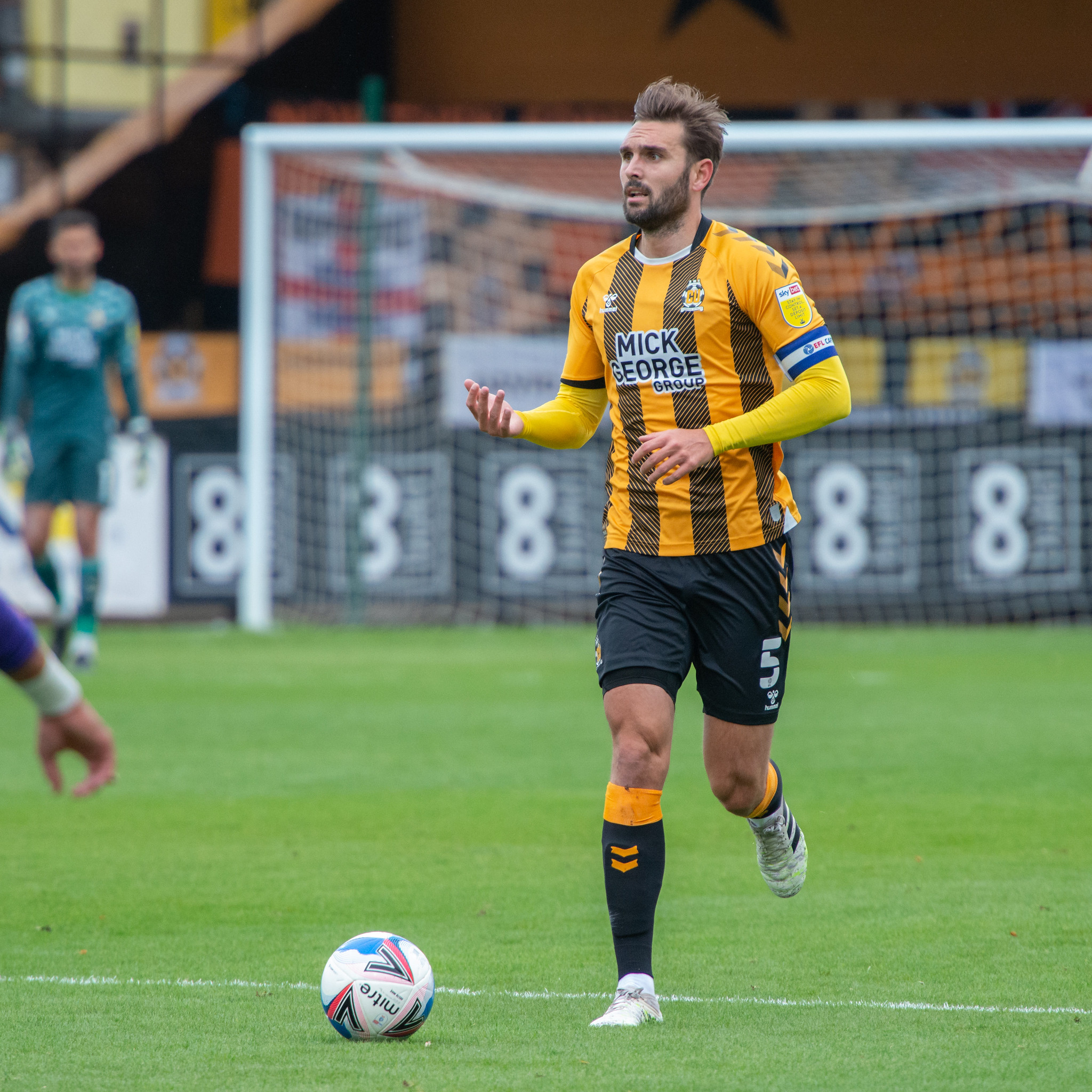

Personal information
- Full name: Gregory Vaughan Taylor
- Date of birth: 15 January 1990 (age 36)
- Place of birth: Bedford, England
- Height: 6 ft 1 in (1.85 m)
- Position: Defender

Team information
- Current team: Bedford Town

Senior career*
Years	Team	Apps	(Gls)
2008–2009	Northampton Town	0	(0)
2009–2011	Kettering Town	45	(1)
2011	Darlington	35	(2)
2011–2012	→ Luton Town (loan)	5	(1)
2012–2013	Luton Town	29	(0)
2012	→ Tamworth (loan)	11	(0)
2013	→ Mansfield Town (loan)	9	(0)
2013–2023	Cambridge United	311	(8)
2023–2024	Woking	20	(0)
2024	→ King's Lynn Town (loan)	17	(0)
2024–2025	King's Lynn Town	46	(4)
2025	Bedford Town	0	(0)

International career^{‡}
2010	England C	2	(0)
- * Club domestic league appearances and goals as of 10:47, 20 June 2025 (UTC) ‡ National team caps and goals as of 22:00, 27 September 2012 (UTC)

Gregory Vaughan Taylor (born 15 January 1990) is an English professional footballer who plays for National League North club Bedford Town. He is a central defender who has played at left back for some of his career. He has also played in central midfield.

== Club career ==
=== Early career ===
Taylor was born in Bedford, Bedfordshire.

He made his first team debut for Northampton Town, coming on as a substitute in the 90th minute, away to Premier League team Bolton Wanderers, in the 2–1 win in the League Cup on 26 August 2008. That was his only first-team appearance before Mark Cooper signed him for Conference Premier club Kettering Town before the 2009–10 season. In January 2011 he rejoined Cooper at fellow Conference club Darlington, where he signed an 18-month contract.

Darlington had a poor start in the 2011/12 season which led to the chairman Raj Singh offering reduced terms to some of the playing squad whilst others were sold to balance the books.

In November 2011, Taylor signed on loan at fellow Conference side Luton Town until January 2012, with the deal then becoming permanent. On signing for Luton Town manager Gary Brabin said of Taylor "he's a young lad who is ready for us now. He's got a real energy and that ability to get up and down the pitch." He played in 18 games for Luton during the 2011–12 season, scoring once in a 5–0 victory over his former club Kettering Town.

The following season he went on loan to Conference club Tamworth on 27 September 2012, where he played 10 games over the course of two months. He was involved in Luton's FA Cup campaign to the Fifth Round in early 2013, playing at left-back in 1–0 wins over Wolverhampton Wanderers and Premier League side Norwich City, and also in the 3–0 defeat to Millwall that brought the run to an end. Buckle left the club two weeks later to be replaced by John Still, who reinstated Taylor back to the first-team. However, Taylor chose to leave and sign on loan at promotion-chasing Conference club Mansfield Town on 28 March 2013. Taylor played in Mansfield's final eight games of the season as they won six of them to achieve promotion to The Football League. He was not offered a new contract at Luton and was released by the club at the end of the season.

=== Cambridge United ===
On 20 June 2013, Taylor signed a two-year contract with Cambridge United until the end of the 2014–15 season.

During the 2013/2014 season, Greg Taylor won both the FA Trophy and promotion to the Football League with Cambridge United. He was an integral part of the U's squad to do the double and was ever-present at left back. He signed a contract extension until the 2016–2017 season with the U's in January 2015. Taylor also started in both FA Cup games against Manchester United. The first game saw Manchester United make the trip to the Abbey Stadium which ended in 0–0, earning Cambridge a replay at Old Trafford where they lost 3-0.

Taylor extended his deal with Cambridge United in 2018, which would take him to the end of the 2019–20 season. In 2019 he was made the club captain.

In January 2019, Greg hit a milestone of 250 appearances in Cambridge United's amber and black

On 9 July 2020, Taylor signed a new 1 year contract extension with the U's.

In the 2021–22 season, Cambridge United FC secured promotion to League 1 with Taylor playing in every game during that season.

On 17 August 2021, Taylor suffered an ankle injury vs. Plymouth Argyle. In September 2021, Taylor underwent surgery on the ankle and was ruled out for the remainder of the 2021-22 season.

On 5 May 2022, Taylor signed a further 1-year contract with the East Anglian club.

Taylor was awarded a testimonial match vs. West Ham United F.C on 6 December 2022, in celebration of 10 years at Cambridge United.

He was released by Cambridge at the end of the 2022–23 season after ten years with the club. He departed the club having made 373 appearances, the tenth highest in the club's history.

=== Woking ===
On 4 July 2023, following his departure from Cambridge, Taylor joined National League side, Woking on a one-year deal. On 11 January 2024, Taylor went on loan to National League North club King's Lynn Town until the end of the season.

On 26 April 2024, it was announced that Taylor would leave Woking at the end of his contract in June.

=== Bedford Town ===
In June 2025, Taylor joined hometown club Bedford Town following their promotion to the National League North.

== International career ==
In September 2010, Taylor made his debut for England C against the Wales under-23 selection.

== Career statistics ==
As of end of 2024–25 season

Club	Season	League			FA Cup		League Cup		Other		Total	
Club	Season	Division	Apps	Goals	Apps	Goals	Apps	Goals	Apps	Goals	Apps	Goals
Northampton Town	2008–09	League One	0	0	0	0	1	0	0	0	1	0
Kettering Town	2008–09	Conference Premier	32	1	3	0	—		0	0	35	1
Kettering Town	2010–11	Conference Premier	29	0	0	0	—		0	0	29	0
Kettering Town	Total		61	1	3	0	—		0	0	64	1
Darlington	2011–12	Conference Premier	36	3	0	0	—		1 (Note: Appearances in Conference Premier play-offs)	0	37	3
Luton Town	2012–13	Conference Premier	25	0	3	0	—		0	0	28	0
Cambridge United	2013–14	Conference Premier	46	1	3	0	—		3	0	52	1
Cambridge United	2014–15	League Two	43	0	6	0	1	0	1 (Note: Appearance in Football League Trophy)	0	51	0
Cambridge United	2015–16	League Two	16	0	2	0	1	0	0	0	19	0
Cambridge United	2016–17	League Two	36	2	4	0	2	0	1 (Note: Appearance(s) in EFL Trophy)	0	43	2
Cambridge United	2017–18	League Two	43	1	2	0	1	0	3	0	49	1
Cambridge United	2018–19	League Two	39	2	1	0	—		3	0	43	2
Cambridge United	2019–20	League Two	30	1	2	0	1	0	2	0	35	1
Cambridge United	2020–21	League Two	44	0	1	0	2	0	3	0	50	0
Cambridge United	2021–22	League One	3	0	0	0	1	0	0	0	4	0
Cambridge United	2022–23	League One	11	0	1	0	1	0	2	0	15	0
Cambridge United	Total		311	7	22	0	10	0	18	0	361	7
Woking	2023–24	National League	20	0	3	0	—		0	0	23	0
King's Lynn Town (loan)	2023–24	National League North	17	0	0	0	—		0	0	17	0
King's Lynn Town	2024–25	National League North	46	4	3	0	—		2 (Note: One appearance in FA Trophy, one appearance in National League North play-offs)	0	51	4
King's Lynn Town	Total		63	4	3	0	0	0	2	0	68	4
Career total			516	15	34	0	11	0	20	0	582	15

== Honours ==
Mansfield Town

- Conference Premier: 2012–13

Cambridge United

- Conference Premier play-offs: 2014
- FA Trophy: 2013–14
- EFL League Two second-place promotion: 2020–21
