= Liam O'Neil (footballer) =

English footballer (born 1993)

- O'Neil with Cambridge United in 2026

Personal information
- Full name: Liam Christian James O'Neil
- Date of birth: 31 July 1993 (age 33)
- Place of birth: Cambridge, England
- Height: 5 ft 11 in (1.81 m)
- Position: Midfielder

Team information
- Current team: Cambridge United (under 18s manager)

Youth career
- –2005: Cambridge United
- 2005–2012: Histon

Senior career*
Years	Team	Apps	(Gls)
2012–2015	West Bromwich Albion	3	(0)
2012	→ VPS (loan)	18	(1)
2014–2015	→ Scunthorpe United (loan)	21	(2)
2015–2017	Chesterfield	43	(2)
2017–2023	Cambridge United	145	(6)
2023	Boreham Wood	10	(0)
Total		240	(11)
- * Club domestic league appearances and goals

Liam Christian James O'Neil (born 31 July 1993) is an English coach and former footballer who played as a midfielder. He is under-18s manager at Cambridge United.

== Career ==
=== West Bromwich Albion ===
O'Neil is a product of the West Bromwich Albion youth academy, having joined from Non-League club Histon as a youth player. In May 2012, O'Neil signed his first professional contract with the club.

O'Neil then debuted for West Brom in a crucial 2–1 victory over Swansea City on 15 March 2014, and then went on to make two further appearances from the bench against Stoke City and Norwich City respectively. He subsequently was rewarded for his progress with a new deal in May 2014, officially putting pen to paper on a one-year contract, plus a further year's option in the club's favour, on 1 July 2014. He made his Football League Cup debut on 24 September 2014 against Hull City; West Brom ended up winning the match 3–2. O'Neil's performance was praised by Manager Alan Irvine. He made another appearance for West Brom in the League Cup against AFC Bournemouth on 28 October 2014 though West Brom ended up losing the match 2–1.

At the end of the 2014–15 season, O'Neil had his contract extended for another season.

=== Loan spells ===
O'Neil gained professional experience during a loan spell at Finnish club VPS in summer 2012. He quickly made an impact for the club in the first team and was named May's Team of the Month. O'Neil would score his first goal for the club, in a 3–1 win over Turun Palloseura on 14 July 2012. O'Neil went on to make eighteen appearances for VPS before returning to England in early August.

In late-November, O'Neil joined Football League One side Scunthorpe United on a one-month loan. Making three appearances so far at the club earned O'Neil a loan extension until 13 January 2014. O'Neil then scored his first goal for the club, in a 2–1 win over Rochdale on Boxing Day. Soon after, O'Neil's loan spell with Scunthorpe United was soon extended until the end of the season. A few weeks later on 31 January 2015, O'Neil scored his second goal for the club, in a 4–1 win over Leyton Orient. However, O'Neil was dropped from the squad before it was revealed he injured his ankle, which saw him returned to his parent club early.

=== Chesterfield ===
On 24 August 2015, O'Neil joined League One side Chesterfield for an undisclosed fee.

=== Cambridge United ===
On 31 January 2017, O'Neil joined Cambridge United on a three-and-a-half-year contract for an undisclosed fee.

In April 2018 O'Neil was awarded the 2017/18 EFL Sky Bet League Two PFA Player in the Community in recognition of his community work with Cambridge United Community Trust.

In August 2019 O'Neil was fined £3,000 by the Football Association after admitting "improper conduct".

O'Neil signed a new one-year contract in May 2022, signing for a seventh season.

=== Boreham Wood ===
On 11 August 2023, O'Neil signed for National League club Boreham Wood.

== Coaching career ==
On 8 December 2023, O'Neil retired from football and returned to Cambridge United and took up the role as Under 18s manager.

== Personal life ==
Born in Cambridge, O'Neil has said he is open to play for Wales national football team, as his mother is from Mumbles, Wales.

== Career statistics ==
Appearances and goals by club, season and competition
Club	Season	League			National cup		League cup		Other		Total	
Club	Season	Division	Apps	Goals	Apps	Goals	Apps	Goals	Apps	Goals	Apps	Goals
West Bromwich Albion	2013–14	Premier League	3	0	0	0	0	0	0	0	3	0
West Bromwich Albion	2014–15	Premier League	0	0	0	0	2	0	0	0	2	0
VPS (loan)	2012	Veikkausliiga	18	1	2	0	0	0	0	0	20	1
Scunthorpe United (loan)	2014–15	League One	21	2	0	0	0	0	0	0	21	2
Chesterfield	2015–16	League One	26	0	2	0	0	0	1	0	29	0
Chesterfield	2016–17	League One	17	2	2	0	0	0	1	0	12	1
Chesterfield	Total		43	2	4	0	0	0	2	0	49	2
Cambridge United	2016–17	League Two	13	1	0	0	0	0	0	0	13	1
Cambridge United	2017–18	League Two	26	0	2	0	0	0	3	0	31	0
Cambridge United	2018–19	League Two	19	0	1	0	1	0	4	0	25	0
Cambridge United	2019–20	League Two	28	1	2	0	0	0	1	0	31	1
Cambridge United	2020–21	League Two	21	2	0	0	1	0	1	0	23	2
Cambridge United	2021–22	League One	21	1	1	0	0	0	1	0	23	1
Cambridge United	2022–23	League One	17	1	0	0	1	1	3	0	21	2
Cambridge United	Total		145	6	6	0	3	1	13	0	167	7
Boreham Wood	2023–24	National League	10	0	1	0	—		0	0	11	0
Career total			240	11	13	0	5	1	15	0	273	12
