= Jevani Brown =

Jamaican footballer (born 1994)

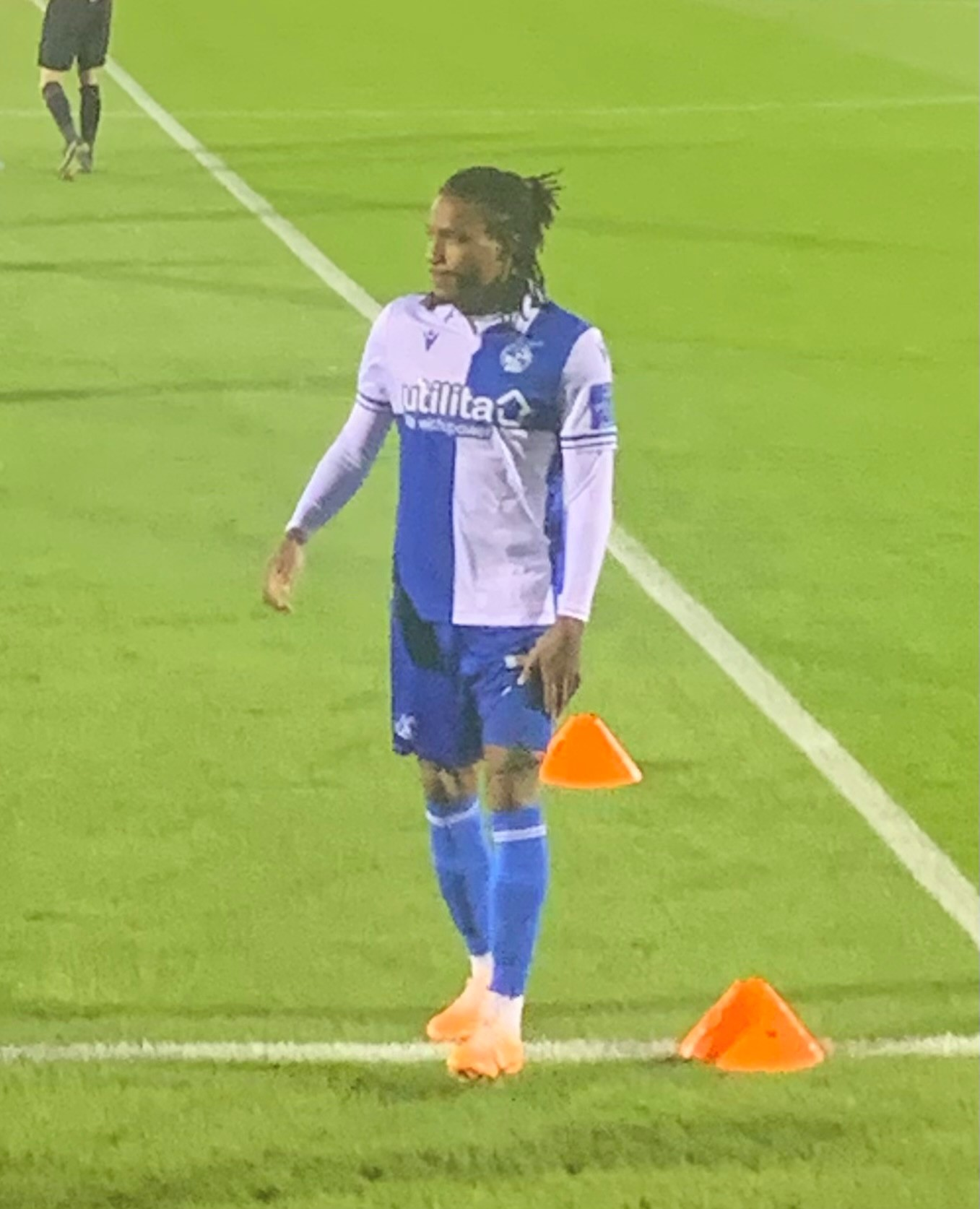
- Jevani Brown at Bristol Rovers F.C. in 2023

Personal information
- Full name: Jevani Jason Brown
- Date of birth: 16 October 1994 (age 32)
- Place of birth: Letchworth, England
- Height: 5 ft 9 in (1.75 m)
- Position: Forward

Team information
- Current team: Peterborough Sports

Youth career
- –2011: Milton Keynes Dons
- 2011–2012: Stotfold
- 2012: Letchworth Garden City Eagles
- 2012–2013: Peterborough United

Senior career*
Years	Team	Apps	(Gls)
2013	Peterborough United	0	(0)
2014	Langford		
2014–2015	Barton Rovers	13	(2)
	Arlesey Town	9	(1)
2015–2016	Kettering Town	15	(0)
2016	Arlesey Town		
2016	Stamford	15	(3)
2016–2017	St Neots Town	19	(19)
2017–2019	Cambridge United	84	(13)
2019–2021	Colchester United	51	(7)
2020	→ Forest Green Rovers (loan)	5	(0)
2021–2023	Exeter City	70	(19)
2023–2025	Bristol Rovers	33	(1)
2024–2025	→ Notts County (loan)	14	(0)
2025–2026	Hemel Hempstead Town	9	(0)
2026	Bedford Town	17	(2)
2026–	Peterborough Sports	0	(0)

International career
2011	Jamaica U17	5	(0)
- * Club domestic league appearances and goals as of 19:28, 28 May 2026 (UTC)

Jevani Jason Brown (born 16 October 1994) is a professional footballer who plays as a forward for Southern League Premier Division Central club Peterborough Sports. Born in England, he represents Jamaica internationally.

== Club career ==
=== Early career ===
Brown started his career at Milton Keynes Dons and joined Peterborough United at a young age, and quickly impressed within their youth ranks. Brown became a regular for the Peterborough youth sides and was rewarded with promotion to the first-team squad ahead of the 2013–14 campaign. However, following an off-the-field incident, Brown was subsequently released by Peterborough in November 2013.

Following his release from Peterborough, Brown had spells at several non-league sides including Langford, Barton Rovers, Wingate & Finchley and Arlesey Town before joining Kettering Town in July 2015. Brown went onto feature nineteen times scoring just once in an FA Cup tie against Market Drayton Town. Brown went on to appear as a trialist for St Albans City during their Herts Senior Cup tie against Hitchin Town in February 2016, however, the club opted against signing the Jamaican forward.

=== Stamford ===
Brown rejoined Arlesey Town, before making the switch to Northern Premier League Division One South side Stamford ahead of the 2016–17 campaign.

On the opening day of the campaign, Brown made his debut for Stamford, replacing John King during their 3–1 home defeat against Witton Albion. Three days later, Brown scored both goals during their 2–1 away victory over Rugby Town, cancelling out David Kolodynski opener in the 71st minute, then sealing the win in the final seconds. Brown was part of Stamford's impressive FA Cup run, in which he netted three times in nine appearances, before they were knocked out by League Two side Hartlepool United in the first round.

=== St Neots Town ===
Following an impressive start to the campaign with Stamford, Brown opted to join Southern Football League Premier Division side St Neots Town in late 2016. He made his debut on 2 January 2017, in their 1–0 away defeat against Dunstable Town. Brown went onto score his first goal for St Neots during their 3–2 home victory over Dorchester Town. Brown went on an impressive run towards the end of the campaign, netting eighteen times in seventeen games.

Following this impressive form, Brown attracted significant interest from Football League sides including Birmingham City, Hull City and Cambridge United.

=== Cambridge United ===
Although Brown had trialled at Birmingham City, he joined League Two side Cambridge United on a two-year deal in August 2017. On 8 August 2017, Brown made his Football League debut during Cambridge's EFL Cup first round tie against Bristol Rovers, replacing David Amoo in the 4–1 away defeat. On 21 October 2017, Brown scored his first Football League goal during Cambridge's 2–1 home victory over Chesterfield, netting United's equaliser in the 70th minute.

=== Colchester United ===
Brown signed for Cambridge's League Two rivals Colchester United on a two-year contract for an undisclosed fee on 4 July 2019. He made his club debut on 3 August in Colchester's 1–1 home draw with Port Vale.

On 4 January 2020, Brown joined Colchester's League Two rivals Forest Green Rovers on loan for the remainder of the season. He made his debut for the club the same day in a 1–1 draw with Crawley Town.

Brown returned to Colchester for the 2020–21 season and scored his first goal for the club in his first appearance of the season, scoring the opening goal in a 3–1 EFL Cup defeat by Reading on 5 September 2020. He scored his first professional career hat-trick on 3 November, scoring all three Colchester goals in their 3–1 win over Stevenage. A week later, he scored another hat-trick in Colchester's 6–1 win in the Essex derby against Southend United in the EFL Trophy.

On 14 May 2021, Brown was released by Colchester at the end of his contract, having scored eleven goals in 62 appearances for the club.

=== Exeter City ===
Brown signed for Exeter City on 29 June 2021. In the 2021–22 season, he scored 7 goals and assisted 12, as Exeter achieved promotion to League One for the 2022–23 season. On 24 September 2022, Brown scored his third career hat-trick, and his first for Exeter City, in a 0–4 win at his former club, Forest Green Rovers, which included the conversion of two penalty spot kicks.

On 6 February 2023, Brown was charged with assaulting a woman in Exeter city centre four days prior. In a club statement, Exeter stated that he would not be selected to play until the conclusion of legal proceedings. He pleaded guilty on 23 March 2023, but pleaded not guilty to a second charge relating to another woman on the same night. A trial date was set for 7 July. In May 2023, Exeter City announced that Brown was being released.

=== Bristol Rovers ===
On 26 June 2023, Brown signed for League One club Bristol Rovers on a two-year deal with the option for a further year. His signing drew criticism for the club on account of his ongoing assault case. On 7 July 2023, he was fined £5,000 having admitted slapping and spitting at a woman outside a nightclub. He made his debut for the club on the opening day of the season, assisting Luke Thomas for his side's goal in a 1–1 draw at Portsmouth. It took him until 3 October to score his first goal for the club, scoring the third goal from distance in a comfortable 3–0 victory over Port Vale.

==== Notts County (loan) ====
On 30 August 2024, Brown joined League Two club Notts County on a season-long loan. His loan was terminated on 18 January 2025.

Having failed to make an appearance following his return to Bristol Rovers, he was released at the end of the 2024–25 season.

=== Hemel Hempstead Town ===
On 12 September 2025, Brown joined National League South club Hemel Hempstead Town.

=== Bedford Town ===
In January 2026, he joined National League North club Bedford Town.

=== Peterborough Sports ===
In May 2026, Brown joined Southern League Premier Division Central club Peterborough Sports.

== International career ==
Brown has represented Jamaica at under-17 level, making his debut during their 2011 CONCACAF U17 Championship fixture against Guatemala in February 2011.

In August 2022, Brown was called up to represent Jamaica at the 2022 Austria Mini Tournament.

== Career statistics ==
As of end of 2025–26 season

Appearances and goals by club, season and competition
Club	Season	Division	League		FA Cup		EFL Cup		Other		Total	
Club	Season	Division	Apps	Goals	Apps	Goals	Apps	Goals	Apps	Goals	Apps	Goals
Barton Rovers	2014–15	SL Division One Central	13	2	2	0	—		0	0	15	2
Arlesey Town	2014–15	SL Premier Division	9	1	0	0	—		0	0	9	1
Kettering Town	2015–16	SL Premier Division	15	0	4	1	—		0	0	19	1
Stamford	2016–17	NPL Division One South	15	3	9	3	—		2 (Note: One appearance in FA Trophy, one in Northern Premier League Challenge Cup)	0	26	6
St Neots Town	2016–17	SL Premier Division	19	19	0	0	—		0	0	19	19
Cambridge United	2017–18	EFL League Two	41	6	2	0	1	0	3 (Note: Appearance(s) in EFL Trophy)	0	47	6
Cambridge United	2018–19	EFL League Two	43	7	1	0	0	0	4	1	48	8
Cambridge United	Total		84	13	3	0	1	0	7	1	95	14
Colchester United	2019–20	EFL League Two	11	0	0	0	3	0	3	0	17	0
Colchester United	2020–21	EFL League Two	40	7	1	0	1	1	3	3	45	11
Colchester United	Total		51	7	1	0	4	1	6	3	62	11
Forest Green Rovers (loan)	2019–20	EFL League Two	5	0	–		–		0	0	5	0
Exeter City	2021–22	EFL League Two	43	7	3	0	1	0	2	0	49	7
Exeter City	2022–23	EFL League One	27	12	2	2	1	0	2	0	32	14
Exeter City	Total		70	19	5	2	2	0	4	0	81	21
Bristol Rovers	2023–24	League One	33	1	3	1	1	0	4	0	41	2
Bristol Rovers	2024–25	League One	0	0	0	0	0	0	0	0	0	0
Bristol Rovers	Total		33	1	3	1	1	0	4	0	41	2
Notts County (loan)	2024–25	League Two	14	0	2	2	0	0	2	0	18	2
Hemel Hempstead Town	2025–26	National League South	9	0	5	0	—		2 (Note: Appearance(s) in FA Trophy)	0	16	0
Bedford Town	2025–26	National League North	17	2	—		—		0	0	17	2
Career total			354	67	34	9	8	1	27	4	423	81

== Honours ==
Exeter City

- League Two runner-up: 2021–22

Individual

- EFL League Two Player of the Month: November 2020
