= Matthew Foy =

English association football player

Personal information
- Full name: Matthew Ian Foy
- Date of birth: 2 November 1998 (age 28)
- Place of birth: Huntingdon, England
- Position: Forward

Team information
- Current team: St Ives Town

Youth career
- Chatteris Fen Tigers
- Wisbech Town
- 2005–2014: Cambridge United

Senior career*
Years	Team	Apps	(Gls)
2014–2019	Cambridge United	0	(0)
2017	→ Cambridge City (loan)	13	(3)
2017	→ St Neots Town (loan)	5	(0)
2017	→ Lowestoft Town (loan)	4	(2)
2018	→ Harlow Town (loan)	10	(8)
2018	→ Chelmsford City (loan)	3	(0)
2018	→ Kettering Town (loan)	2	(0)
2018–2019	→ Harlow Town (loan)	27	(14)
2019	Cambridge City		
2019–	St Ives Town	22	(7)
- * Club domestic league appearances and goals as of 02:00, 19 April 2020 (UTC)

Matthew Ian Foy (born 2 November 1998) is an English footballer who plays for Northern Premier League Division One Midlands side St Ives Town, where he plays as a forward.

== Club career ==
Foy joined Cambridge United at under-9 level after a spell with local side Wisbech Town. In November 2016, Foy signed his first professional contract, agreeing to a three-year deal. Following this, Foy went onto make his first-team debut during Cambridge's EFL Trophy tie against Scunthorpe United, in which he replaced Joe Pigott in the 2–0 defeat. Since making his debut in November 2016, Foy has enjoyed loan spells at Cambridge City and St Neots Town. In November 2017, he was loaned out to Lowestoft Town for a month. On 3 August 2018, Foy signed for Chelmsford City on a one-month loan deal. On 31 August 2018, Foy joined Kettering Town on loan. Foy enjoyed a loan spell with Harlow Town during the 2018–19 season, making 27 appearances, and scoring 14 goals.

== Career statistics ==
=== Club ===
As of match played 3 October 2017

Appearances and goals by club, season and competition
Club	Season	League			FA Cup		EFL Cup		Other		Total	
Club	Season	Division	Apps	Goals	Apps	Goals	Apps	Goals	Apps	Goals	Apps	Goals
Cambridge United	2014–15	League Two	0	0	0	0	0	0	0	0	0	0
Cambridge United	2016–17	League Two	0	0	0	0	0	0	1 (Note: Appearance(s) in EFL Trophy)	0	1	0
Cambridge United	2017–18	League Two	0	0	0	0	0	0	1	0	1	0
Cambridge United	Total		0	0	0	0	0	0	2	0	2	0
Cambridge City (loan)	2016–17	Southern League Premier Division	13	3	0	0	—		0	0	13	3
St Neots Town (loan)	2017–18	Southern League Premier Division	5	0	0	0	—		0	0	5	0
Career total			18	3	0	0	0	0	2	0	20	3
