= 2014–15 FA Cup =

Football Association Challenge Cup
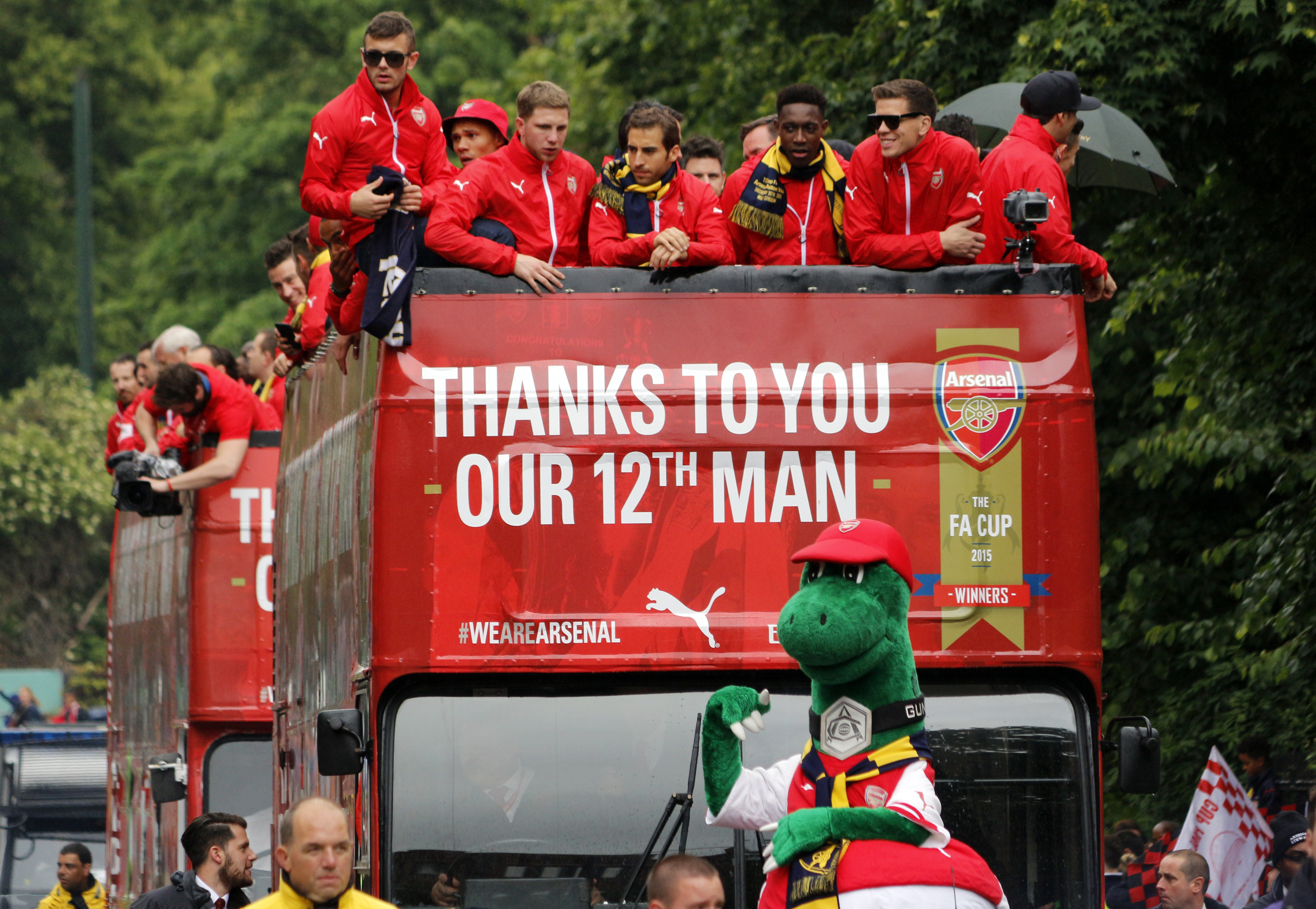
- Arsenal's victory parade following their 12th title

Tournament details
- Country: England; Guernsey; Wales
- Dates: 16 August 2014 – 30 May 2015
- Teams: 736

Final positions
- Champions: Arsenal (12th title)
- Runners-up: Aston Villa

Tournament statistics
- Matches played: 154
- Attendance: 2,099,192 (13,631 per match)
- Top goal scorer(s): Saido Berahino; Paul Gallagher; Jon Stead (5 goals each)
- (Note: All statistics do not include qualifying play-offs)

The 2014–15 FA Cup, also called the 2014–15 FA Challenge Cup, was the 134th occurrence of the FA Cup, the main domestic cup in English football and the oldest knockout competition in the world. It was the first season when the BBC and BT Sport hosted televised matches, seven years after the BBC lost the rights to ITV. The 2014–15 season's Cup also marked the first time that 3G (third generation) artificial pitches were allowed in all rounds of the competition, designed to lower costs for maintenance. After Queens Park Rangers (the first English artificial pitch, from 1981 to 1988), Luton Town, Oldham Athletic and Preston North End trialled artificial pitches in the 1980s, they were made illegal in 1995.

The defending champions were Premier League side Arsenal, who beat Hull City 3–2 in the previous final. They retained the trophy after beating Aston Villa 4–0 in the final.

The semi-finals took place at Wembley Stadium, as they have since 2008, to offset the cost of the new stadium, despite protestations from some supporters. The stadium also hosted the final.

The winner of the FA Cup earns automatic qualification to the 2015–16 UEFA Europa League group stages. However, as Arsenal qualified for the UEFA Champions League via their league position, Southampton, the highest placed team in the 2014–15 Premier League not already Europe-qualified took this Europa League place. In a change to Europa League rules, qualifying slots for national cup winners no longer pass to the runners-up if the winners have already qualified through their league.

Notably, EFL Championship side Reading F.C. reached the semi-finals, for only the second time in their history.

== Teams ==
Round	Clubs remaining	Clubs involved	Winners from previous round	New entries this round	Leagues entering at this round
First round proper	124	80	32	48	EFL League One; EFL League Two
Second round proper	84	40	40	none	none
Third round proper	64	64	20	44	Premier League; EFL Championship
Fourth round proper	32	32	32	none	none
Fifth round proper	16	16	16	none	none
Quarter-finals	8	8	8	none	none
Semi-finals	4	4	4	none	none
Final	2	2	2	none	none

== Qualifying rounds ==
All teams that entered the competition, but were not members of the Premier League or The Football League, competed in the qualifying rounds to secure one of 32 places available in the first round proper.

The winners from the fourth qualifying round were AFC Telford United, Grimsby Town, Norton United, Warrington Town, Lincoln City, Wrexham, AFC Fylde, Blyth Spartans, Gateshead, FC Halifax Town, Altrincham, Chester, Southport, Bristol Rovers, East Thurrock United, Forest Green Rovers, Dartford, Maidstone United, Gosport Borough, Weston-super-Mare, Dover Athletic, Braintree Town, Worcester City, Havant & Waterlooville, Concord Rangers, Basingstoke Town, Aldershot Town, Eastleigh, Bromley, Hemel Hempstead Town, Woking and Barnet.

Norton United, Warrington Town, Gosport Borough and Concord Rangers were appearing in the competition proper for the first time. Reconstituted clubs Chester and Maidstone United were also featuring in the first round for the first time in their own right, Chester since the dissolution of Chester City in 2010 and Maidstone United since the original club of that name resigned from the Football League and folded in 1992. Of the other qualifying clubs, Worcester City had last featured in the first round in 2005-06, Weston-super-Mare had last done so in 2003-04 and Hemel Hempstead Town had last done so back in 1938-39 (when the club was still known as Apsley).

== First round proper ==
The first round draw took place on 27 October 2014 at 19:00, at St George's Park. A total of 80 teams competed, 32 of which had progressed from the fourth qualifying round and 48 from League One and League Two of the Football League. The lowest ranked sides in this round were Norton United and Warrington Town, both of whom competed at level 8 of English football. However, Norton United would be evicted from their ground shortly after their match in this round and would fold at the end of the season.

Number of teams per tier still in competition
Premier League (Note: Premier League and Championship teams joined the competition in the third round proper.)	Championship	League One	League Two	Non-League	Total
20 / 20	24 / 24	24 / 24	24 / 24	32 / 32	124 / 124

7 November 2014	Warrington Town (8)	1–0	Exeter City (4)	Warrington
19:55	Robinson 7'	Report		Stadium: Cantilever Park; Attendance: 2,400; Referee: David Coote

8 November 2014	Yeovil Town (3)	1–0	Crawley Town (3)	Yeovil
15:00	Hiwula 7'	Report		Stadium: Huish Park; Attendance: 2,355; Referee: Phil Gibbs

8 November 2014	York City (4)	1–1	AFC Wimbledon (4)	York
15:00	Hyde 8'	Report	Frampton 22'	Stadium: Bootham Crescent; Attendance: 2,085; Referee: Mark Brown

18 November 2014 Replay	AFC Wimbledon (4)	3–1	York City (4)	Kingston upon Thames
19:45	Smith 71'; Tubbs 81', 90+1'	Report	Fletcher 5'	Stadium: Kingsmeadow; Attendance: 2,048; Referee: Peter Bankes

8 November 2014	Walsall (3)	2–2	Shrewsbury Town (4)	Walsall
15:00	Bradshaw 56', 90'	Report	Ellis 5'; Collins 61'	Stadium: Bescot Stadium; Attendance: 3,546; Referee: Darren Deadman

18 November 2014 Replay	Shrewsbury Town (4)	1–0	Walsall (3)	Shrewsbury
19:45	Lawrence 53'	Report		Stadium: New Meadow; Attendance: 4,222; Referee: Darren Deadman

8 November 2014	Eastleigh (5)	2–1	Lincoln City (5)	Eastleigh
15:00	McAllister 9'; Strevens 90'	Report	Sam-Yorke 73'	Stadium: Ten Acres; Attendance: 873; Referee: Nick Kinseley

8 November 2014	Basingstoke Town (6)	1–1	AFC Telford United (5)	Basingstoke
15:00	Flood 50'	Report	McDonald 18'	Stadium: The Camrose; Attendance: 1,251; Referee: Richard Martin

18 November 2014 Replay	AFC Telford United (5)	2–1	Basingstoke Town (6)	Telford
19:45	Parry 11'; Gray 33'	Report	Soares 52'	Stadium: New Bucks Head; Attendance: 1,006; Referee: Carl Berry

8 November 2014	Dagenham & Redbridge (4)	0–0	Southport (5)	Dagenham
15:00		Report		Stadium: Victoria Road; Attendance: 1,172; Referee: Keith Hill

18 November 2014 Replay	Southport (5)	2–0	Dagenham & Redbridge (4)	Southport
19:45	Marsden 50'; Hattersley 58' (pen.)	Report		Stadium: Merseyrail Community Stadium; Attendance: 1,472; Referee: Darren Drysdale

8 November 2014	Peterborough United (3)	2–1	Carlisle United (4)	Peterborough
15:00	Burgess 42', 90'	Report	Asamoah 8'	Stadium: London Road; Attendance: 3,168; Referee: Scott Mathieson

8 November 2014	Cheltenham Town (4)	5–0	Swindon Town (3)	Cheltenham
15:00	Harrison 10', 53', 84'; Gornell 36'; Richards 72'	Report		Stadium: Whaddon Road; Attendance: 3,470; Referee: Carl Boyeson

8 November 2014	Bromley (6)	3–4	Dartford (5)	Bromley
15:00	Dennis 1'; Ademola 58'; Waldren 73'	Report	Harris 48'; Hayes 57'; E. Bradbrook 65'; T. Bradbrook 81'	Stadium: Hayes Lane; Attendance: 4,105; Referee: Steven Rushton

8 November 2014	Barnet (5)	1–3	Wycombe Wanderers (4)	Barnet
15:00	Akinde 3'	Report	Hayes 34' (pen.); Pierre 59'; Wood 74'	Stadium: The Hive Stadium; Attendance: 2,410; Referee: Oliver Langford

8 November 2014	Gillingham (3)	1–2	Bristol City (3)	Gillingham
15:00	Kedwell 81' (pen.)	Report	Cunningham 40'; Emmanuel-Thomas 77'	Stadium: Priestfield Stadium; Attendance: 2,654; Referee: Pat Miller

8 November 2014	Crewe Alexandra (3)	0–0	Sheffield United (3)	Crewe
15:00		Report		Stadium: Gresty Road; Attendance: 3,222; Referee: Mick Russell

18 November 2014 Replay	Sheffield United (3)	2–0	Crewe Alexandra (3)	Sheffield
19:45	Flynn 19', 77'	Report		Stadium: Bramall Lane; Attendance: 5,987; Referee: Geoff Eltringham

8 November 2014	Grimsby Town (5)	1–3	Oxford United (4)	Cleethorpes
15:00	Pearson 80'	Report	Roberts 35', 42'; Rose 51'	Stadium: Blundell Park; Attendance: 3,241; Referee: Chris Kavanagh

8 November 2014	Tranmere Rovers (4)	1–0	Bristol Rovers (5)	Tranmere
15:00	Power 54' (pen.)	Report		Stadium: Prenton Park; Attendance: 3,559; Referee: Darren England

8 November 2014	Southend United (4)	1–2	Chester (5)	Southend
15:00	Corr 31' (pen.)	Report	Heneghan 5'; Mahon 51'	Stadium: Roots Hall; Attendance: 4,047; Referee: Graham Horwood

8 November 2014	Luton Town (4)	4–2	Newport County (4)	Luton
15:00	Guttridge 40'; Benson 58'; Miller 77'; Howells 86'	Report	Klukowski 51'; O'Connor 64'	Stadium: Kenilworth Road; Attendance: 3,656; Referee: Chris Sarginson

8 November 2014	Bury (4)	3–1	Hemel Hempstead Town (6)	Bury
15:00	Tutte 16'; Cameron 88'; Nardiello 90'	Report	Potton 10'	Stadium: Gigg Lane; Attendance: 2,944; Referee: Andy Haines

8 November 2014	Cambridge United (4)	1–0	Fleetwood Town (3)	Cambridge
15:00	Appiah 80'	Report		Stadium: Abbey Stadium; Attendance: 2,870; Referee: Gary Sutton

8 November 2014	Northampton Town (4)	0–0	Rochdale (3)	Northampton
15:00		Report		Stadium: Sixfields Stadium; Attendance: 2,790; Referee: Kevin Johnson

18 November 2014 Replay	Rochdale (3)	2–1	Northampton Town (4)	Rochdale
19:45	Noble-Lazarus 85'; Lancashire 90+4'	Report	Toney 4'	Stadium: Spotland; Attendance: 1,717; Referee: Richard Clark

8 November 2014	Dover Athletic (5)	1–0	Morecambe (4)	River
15:00	Payne 45'	Report		Stadium: Crabble Athletic Ground; Attendance: 1,609; Referee: Michael Bull

8 November 2014	Port Vale (3)	3–4	Milton Keynes Dons (3)	Burslem
15:00	Williamson 11'; N'Guessan 44', 85'	Report	Afobe 31', 59' (pen.); Baker 40'; Green 81'	Stadium: Vale Park; Attendance: 4,120; Referee: Charles Breakspear

8 November 2014	Plymouth Argyle (4)	2–0	AFC Fylde (6)	Plymouth
15:00	Hartley 28'; Morgan 69'	Report		Stadium: Home Park; Attendance: 5,153; Referee: James Linington

8 November 2014	Barnsley (3)	5–0	Burton Albion (4)	Barnsley
15:00	Winnall 40', 42', 74'; Hourihane 76'; Cole 83'	Report		Stadium: Oakwell; Attendance: 5,158; Referee: David Webb

8 November 2014	Hartlepool United (4)	2–0	East Thurrock United (7)	Hartlepool
15:00	Franks 32', 86'	Report		Stadium: Victoria Park; Attendance: 2,800; Referee: Ben Toner

8 November 2014	Oldham Athletic (3)	1–0	Leyton Orient (3)	Oldham
15:00	Jones 38'	Report		Stadium: Boundary Park; Attendance: 3,034; Referee: Seb Stockbridge

9 November 2014	FC Halifax Town (5)	1–2	Bradford City (3)	Halifax
12:00	Maynard 3'	Report	Stead 50'; Morais 53'	Stadium: The Shay; Attendance: 8,042; Referee: Andy D'Urso

9 November 2014	Coventry City (3)	1–2	Worcester City (6)	Coventry
14:00	Johnson 81'	Report	Geddes 41' (pen.), 55'	Stadium: Ricoh Arena; Attendance: 8,439; Referee: Ross Joyce

9 November 2014	Braintree Town (5)	0–6	Chesterfield (3)	Braintree
14:00		Report	Doyle 20', 90'; O'Shea 30'; Clucas 45'; Roberts 53'; Clerima 74' (o.g.)	Stadium: Cressing Road; Attendance: 1,206; Referee: Brendan Malone

9 November 2014	Portsmouth (4)	2–2	Aldershot Town (5)	Portsmouth
14:00	Wallace 16' (pen.); Hollands 81'	Report	Roberts 45'; Molesley 68'	Stadium: Fratton Park; Attendance: 11,095; Referee: Paul Tierney

19 November 2014 Replay	Aldershot Town (5)	1–0	Portsmouth (4)	Aldershot
19:45	Molesley 81'	Report		Stadium: Electrical Services Stadium; Attendance: 5,374; Referee: Stuart Attwell

9 November 2014	Wrexham (5)	3–0	Woking (5)	Wrexham
14:00	Ashton 19'; York 36'; Bishop 43'	Report		Stadium: Racecourse Ground; Attendance: 2,253; Referee: Simon Bennett

9 November 2014	Blyth Spartans (7)	4–1	Altrincham (5)	Blyth
14:00	Dale 4' (pen.), 86'; Maguire 61', 88'	Report	Perry 72'	Stadium: Croft Park; Attendance: 1,763; Referee: Martin Coy

9 November 2014	Forest Green Rovers (5)	0–2	Scunthorpe United (3)	Nailsworth
14:00		Report	McSheffrey 20', 60'	Stadium: The New Lawn; Attendance: 1,791; Referee: Graham Scott

9 November 2014	Gosport Borough (6)	3–6	Colchester United (3)	Gosport
14:00	Bennett 39', 53'; Wort 90+3'	Report	Massey 14'; Watt 21'; Sears 26', 78'; Gilbey 45+1'; Szmodics 90+2'	Stadium: Privett Park; Attendance: 2,013; Referee: Lee Collins

9 November 2014	Norton United (8)	0–4	Gateshead (5)	Stoke-on-Trent
14:00		Report	Rodman 11'; Ramshaw 39', 43', 74'	Stadium: Norton Cricket Club & MW Institute; Attendance: 1,762; Referee: Lee Swabey

9 November 2014	Stevenage (4)	0–0	Maidstone United (7)	Stevenage
14:00		Report		Stadium: Broadhall Way; Attendance: 2,935; Referee: Brett Huxtable

20 November 2014 Replay	Maidstone United (7)	2–1	Stevenage (4)	Maidstone
19:45	Collin 2', 87'	Report	Charles 47'	Stadium: Gallagher Stadium; Attendance: 2,226; Referee: Simon Hooper

9 November 2014	Notts County (3)	0–0	Accrington Stanley (4)	Nottingham
15:00		Report		Stadium: Meadow Lane; Attendance: 3,661; Referee: Darren Bond

18 November 2014 Replay	Accrington Stanley (4)	2–1	Notts County (3)	Accrington
19:45	Joyce 45'; Carver 49'	Report	Murray 12'	Stadium: Crown Ground; Attendance: 1,026; Referee: Eddie Ilderton

10 November 2014	Havant & Waterlooville (6)	0–3	Preston North End (3)	Havant
20:00		Report	Robinson 7', 30', 81' (pen.)	Stadium: West Leigh Park; Attendance: 2,382; Referee: Stephen Martin

18 November 2014	Weston-super-Mare (6)	1–4	Doncaster Rovers (3)	Weston-super-Mare
19:45	Monelle 90+3'	Report	Main 16', 36'; Coppinger 45+1'; Wellens 64'	Stadium: Woodspring Stadium; Attendance: 2,949; Referee: Tim Robinson

18 November 2014	Mansfield Town (4)	1–1	Concord Rangers (6)	Mansfield
19:45	Glozier 17' (o.g.)	Report	Chiedozie 18'	Stadium: Field Mill; Attendance: 2,023; Referee: Kevin Wright

25 November 2014 Replay	Concord Rangers (6)	0–1	Mansfield Town (4)	Canvey Island
19:45		Report	Palmer 61'	Stadium: The Aspect Arena; Attendance: 1,537; Referee: Andy Davies

== Second round proper ==
The second round draw took place on 10 November 2014 at 19:00, at the National Football Museum. A total of forty teams competed, all of which had progressed from the first round. The lowest ranked side in this round was Warrington Town, who competed at level 8 of English football. Chesterfield initially faced expulsion from the tournament after fielding an ineligible player, but were required to play their second round fixture against Milton Keynes Dons again.

Scunthorpe United's penalty win over Worcester City set a new competition record for most penalty kicks taken with 32.

Number of teams per tier still in competition
Premier League (Note: Premier League and Championship teams joined the competition in the third round proper.)	Championship	League One	League Two	Non-League	Total
20 / 20	24 / 24	14 / 24	13 / 24	13 / 32	84 / 124

5 December 2014	Hartlepool United (4)	1–2	Blyth Spartans (7)	Hartlepool
19:55	Franks 31'	Report	Turnbull 56'; Rivers 90'	Stadium: Victoria Park; Attendance: 3,735; Referee: Andrew Madley

6 December 2014	Oxford United (4)	2–2	Tranmere Rovers (4)	Oxford
15:00	Barnett 59', 64'	Report	Stockton 33'; Koumas 76'	Stadium: Kassam Stadium; Attendance: 4,681; Referee: Mark Haywood

16 December 2014 Replay	Tranmere Rovers (4)	2–1	Oxford United (4)	Birkenhead
19:45	Odejayi 36'; Power 76'	Report	Potter 29'	Stadium: Prenton Park; Attendance: 3,296; Referee: Mick Russell

6 December 2014	Bury (4)	1–1	Luton Town (4)	Bury
15:00	Nardiello 90'	Report	Cullen 51'	Stadium: Gigg Lane; Attendance: 2,790; Referee: Nigel Miller

16 December 2014 Replay	Luton Town (4)	1–0	Bury (4)	Luton
19:45	Rooney 48'	Report		Stadium: Kenilworth Road; Attendance: 2,923; Referee: Oliver Langford

6 December 2014	Accrington Stanley (4)	1–1	Yeovil Town (3)	Accrington
15:00	Aldred 64'	Report	Clarke 30'	Stadium: Crown Ground; Attendance: 1,440; Referee: Sebastian Stockbridge

16 December 2014 Replay	Yeovil Town (3)	2–0	Accrington Stanley (4)	Yeovil
19:45	Gillett 84'; Moore 88'	Report		Stadium: Huish Park; Attendance: 6,373; Referee: James Linington

6 December 2014	Milton Keynes Dons (3)	Void (Note: On 15 December, the Football Association ordered that the match be replayed, due to Chesterfield fielding an ineligible player.)	Chesterfield (3)*	Milton Keynes
15:00		Report	Gnanduillet 53'	Stadium: Stadium mk Attendance: 5,591; Referee: Keith Stroud

2 January 2015 Replay	Milton Keynes Dons (3)	0–1	Chesterfield (3)	Milton Keynes
19:45		Report	Roberts 43'	Stadium: Stadium mk Attendance: 8,040; Referee: Stephen Martin

6 December 2014	Oldham Athletic (3)	0–1	Doncaster Rovers (3)	Oldham
15:00		Report	Kusunga 86' (o.g.)	Stadium: Boundary Park; Attendance: 3,242; Referee: Lee Collins

6 December 2014	Preston North End (3)	1–0	Shrewsbury Town (4)	Preston
15:00	Huntington 19'	Report		Stadium: Deepdale; Attendance: 6,011; Referee: David Webb

6 December 2014	Sheffield United (3)	3–0	Plymouth Argyle (4)	Sheffield
15:00	Baxter 55' (pen.), 62' (pen.); McNulty 90'	Report		Stadium: Bramall Lane; Attendance: 7,348; Referee: Gary Sutton

6 December 2014	Cambridge United (4)	2–2	Mansfield Town (4)	Cambridge
15:00	Chadwick 10'; Appiah 90'	Report	Bingham 3'; Champion 81' (o.g.)	Stadium: Abbey Stadium; Attendance: 3,869; Referee: Darren Bond

16 December 2014 Replay	Mansfield Town (4)	0–1	Cambridge United (4)	Mansfield
19:45		Report	Kaikai 10'	Stadium: Field Mill; Attendance: 1,920; Referee: Carl Boyeson

6 December 2014	Wrexham (5)	3–1	Maidstone United (7)	Wrexham
17:30	Smith 19'; Bishop 57' (pen.), 87'	Report	Flisher 63'	Stadium: Racecourse Ground; Attendance: 3,093; Referee: Scott Mathieson

7 December 2014	Gateshead (5)	2–0	Warrington Town (8)	Gateshead
12:00	Pattison 8'; Wright 90+1'	Report		Stadium: Gateshead International Stadium; Attendance: 2,874; Referee: James Adcock

7 December 2014	Scunthorpe United (3)	1–1	Worcester City (6)	Scunthorpe
14:00	Madden 35'	Report	Nti 46'	Stadium: Glanford Park; Attendance: 5,606; Referee: Graham Salisbury

17 December 2014 Replay	Worcester City (6)	1–1 (a.e.t.) (13–14 p)	Scunthorpe United (3)	Kidderminster
19:45	Geddes 69'	Report	Madden 45+2'	Stadium: Aggborough; Attendance: 4,339; Referee: Andy D'Urso
	Penalties
	Geddes (penalty scored); Wright (penalty missed); Deeney (penalty scored); Weir (penalty scored); Thomas (penalty scored); Jackman (penalty missed); Williams (penalty scored); Dunkley (penalty scored); Hutchinson (penalty scored); Vaughan (penalty scored); Geddes (penalty scored); Wright (penalty scored); Deeney (penalty scored); Weir (penalty scored); Thomas (penalty missed)		(penalty scored) Madden; (penalty scored) Williams; (penalty scored) Hawkridge; (penalty scored) Taylor; (penalty missed) Llera; (penalty missed) Sparrow; (penalty scored) Bishop; (penalty scored) Boyce; (penalty scored) Davey; (penalty scored) Slocombe; (penalty scored) Madden; (penalty scored) Williams; (penalty scored) Hawkridge; (penalty scored) Taylor; (penalty scored) Llera

7 December 2014	Southport (5)	2–1	Eastleigh (5)	Southport
14:00	Brodie 45'; Evans 71'	Report	Constable 41'	Stadium: Merseyrail Community Stadium; Attendance: 2,169; Referee: Geoff Eltringham

7 December 2014	Barnsley (3)	0–0	Chester (5)	Barnsley
14:00		Report		Stadium: Oakwell; Attendance: 7,227; Referee: Darren Handley

16 December 2014 Replay	Chester (5)	0–3	Barnsley (3)	Chester
19:45		Report	Hemmings 16'; Jennings 63', 88'	Stadium: Deva Stadium; Attendance: 3,534; Referee: Keith Hill

7 December 2014	Bradford City (3)	4–1	Dartford (5)	Bradford
14:00	Clarke 10'; Stead 31'; Morais 58'; Yeates 59'	Report	Noble 64'	Stadium: Coral Windows Stadium; Attendance: 5,373; Referee: Andy Woolmer

7 December 2014	Cheltenham Town (4)	0–1	Dover Athletic (5)	Cheltenham
14:00		Report	Essam 83'	Stadium: Whaddon Road; Attendance: 3,552; Referee: Dean Whitestone

7 December 2014	Bristol City (3)	1–0	AFC Telford United (5)	Bristol
14:00	Agard 90'	Report		Stadium: Ashton Gate; Attendance: 6,678; Referee: Jeremy Simpson

7 December 2014	Aldershot Town (5)	0–0	Rochdale (3)	Aldershot
14:00		Report		Stadium: Electrical Services Stadium; Attendance: 3,143; Referee: Philip Gibbs

16 December 2014 Replay	Rochdale (3)	4–1	Aldershot Town (5)	Rochdale
19:45	Done 31', 81', 88'; Vincenti 75'	Report	Fitchett 73'	Stadium: Spotland Stadium; Attendance: 2,077; Referee: Mark Brown

7 December 2014	Wycombe Wanderers (4)	0–1	AFC Wimbledon (4)	High Wycombe
14:00		Report	Rigg 56'	Stadium: Adams Park; Attendance: 3,196; Referee: Chris Kavanagh

7 December 2014	Colchester United (3)	1–0	Peterborough United (3)	Colchester
16:30	Moncur 90+1'	Report		Stadium: Colchester Community Stadium; Attendance: 2,905; Referee: Tony Harrington

== Third round proper ==
The third round draw took place on 8 December 2014 at 19:00, at The Deep in Hull, and was broadcast live on BBC Two. A total of 64 teams competed, 20 of which had progressed from the second round and 44 clubs from the Premier League and Football League Championship. The lowest ranked side in this round was Blyth Spartans, who compete at level 7 of English football.

Number of teams per tier still in competition
Premier League	Championship	League One	League Two	Non-League	Total
20 / 20	24 / 24	11 / 24	4 / 24	5 / 32	64 / 124

2 January 2015	Cardiff City (2)	3–1	Colchester United (3)	Cardiff
19:45	Ralls 34'; Harris 53'; Jones 60'	Report	Sears 74'	Stadium: Cardiff City Stadium; Attendance: 4,194; Referee: James Linington

3 January 2015	Charlton Athletic (2)	1–2	Blackburn Rovers (2)	Charlton
15:00	Guðmundsson 55'	Report	Taylor 4', 59'	Stadium: The Valley; Attendance: 8,727; Referee: Keith Stroud

3 January 2015	Rochdale (3)	1–0	Nottingham Forest (2)	Rochdale
15:00	Vincenti 12' (pen.)	Report		Stadium: Spotland Stadium; Attendance: 6,791; Referee: Gary Sutton

3 January 2015	West Bromwich Albion (1)	7–0	Gateshead (5)	West Bromwich
15:00	Berahino 42', 46', 53', 90+2'; Anichebe 45'; Brunt 55'; Morrison 79'	Report		Stadium: The Hawthorns; Attendance: 16,593; Referee: Andrew Madley

3 January 2015	Blyth Spartans (7)	2–3	Birmingham City (2)	Blyth
15:00	Dale 35', 41'	Report	Novak 52'; Thomas 55', 58'	Stadium: Croft Park; Attendance: 3,644; Referee: Mike Jones

3 January 2015	Rotherham United (2)	1–5	Bournemouth (2)	Rotherham
15:00	Brindley 10'	Report	MacDonald 44'; Stanislas 58'; Fraser 63'; Kermorgant 67', 71'	Stadium: New York Stadium; Attendance: 5,875; Referee: Neil Swarbrick

3 January 2015	Huddersfield Town (2)	0–1	Reading (2)	Huddersfield
15:00		Report	Blackman 69'	Stadium: John Smith's Stadium; Attendance: 7,980; Referee: Phil Gibbs

3 January 2015	Tranmere Rovers (4)	2–6	Swansea City (1)	Birkenhead
15:00	Power 70'; Stockton 82'	Report	Dyer 34'; Carroll 49'; Barrow 58'; Gomis 77', 90+4'; Routledge 85'	Stadium: Prenton Park; Attendance: 10,007; Referee: Paul Tierney

3 January 2015	Bolton Wanderers (2)	1–0	Wigan Athletic (2)	Bolton
15:00	Clough 76'	Report		Stadium: Macron Stadium; Attendance: 16,788; Referee: Phil Dowd

3 January 2015	Millwall (2)	3–3	Bradford City (3)	Bermondsey
15:00	McDonald 36'; Fuller 66', 83'	Report	Knott 6', 76'; Nelson 70' (o.g.)	Stadium: The Den; Attendance: 5,470; Referee: David Webb

14 January 2015 Replay	Bradford City (3)	4–0	Millwall (2)	Bradford
19:45	Hanson 8'; Stead 17'; Halliday 39'; Knott 57'	Report		Stadium: Coral Windows Stadium; Attendance: 11,859; Referee: James Adcock

3 January 2015	Derby County (2)	1–0	Southport (5)	Derby
15:00	Martin 90+3' (pen.)	Report		Stadium: Pride Park Stadium; Attendance: 20,201; Referee: Graham Scott

3 January 2015	Brentford (2)	0–2	Brighton & Hove Albion (2)	Brentford
15:00		Report	Dunk 88'; O'Grady 90+3'	Stadium: Griffin Park; Attendance: 8,542; Referee: David Coote

3 January 2015	Fulham (2)	0–0	Wolverhampton Wanderers (2)	Fulham
15:00		Report		Stadium: Craven Cottage; Attendance: 11,879; Referee: Lee Probert

13 January 2015 Replay	Wolverhampton Wanderers (2)	3–3 (a.e.t.) (3–5 p)	Fulham (2)	Wolverhampton
19:45	Edwards 71', 109'; Van La Parra 73'	Report	Woodrow 27', 76'; McCormack 120+2' (pen.)	Stadium: Molineux Stadium; Attendance: 8,148; Referee: David Coote
	Penalties
	Edwards (penalty scored); Doherty (penalty missed); Evans (penalty scored); Clarke (penalty scored)		(penalty scored) McCormack; (penalty scored) Woodrow; (penalty scored) Stafylidis; (penalty scored) Roberts; (penalty scored) Rodallega

3 January 2015	Leicester City (1)	1–0	Newcastle United (1)	Leicester
15:00	Ulloa 39'	Report		Stadium: King Power Stadium; Attendance: 23,212; Referee: Lee Mason

3 January 2015	Cambridge United (4)	2–1	Luton Town (4)	Cambridge
15:00	Simpson 27'; Donaldson 66'	Report	Harriman 74'	Stadium: Abbey Stadium; Attendance: 7,063; Referee: Tony Harrington

3 January 2015	Barnsley (3)	0–2	Middlesbrough (2)	Barnsley
15:00		Report	Vossen 48'; Ayala 84'	Stadium: Oakwell; Attendance: 9,473; Referee: Dean Whitestone

3 January 2015	Preston North End (3)	2–0	Norwich City (2)	Preston
15:00	Gallagher 71', 84'	Report		Stadium: Deepdale; Attendance: 9,807; Referee: Stuart Attwell

3 January 2015	Doncaster Rovers (3)	1–1	Bristol City (3)	Doncaster
15:00	McCullough 50'	Report	M. Smith 75'	Stadium: Keepmoat Stadium; Attendance: 5,671; Referee: Scott Duncan

13 January 2015 Replay	Bristol City (3)	2–0	Doncaster Rovers (3)	Bristol
19:45	Emmanuel-Thomas 36', 79'	Report		Stadium: Ashton Gate Stadium; Attendance: 6,951; Referee: Darren Bond

4 January 2015	Dover Athletic (5)	0–4	Crystal Palace (1)	River
13:00		Report	Dann 10', 34'; Gayle 68'; Doyle 87'	Stadium: Crabble Athletic Ground; Attendance: 5,645; Referee: Andre Marriner

4 January 2015	Sunderland (1)	1–0	Leeds United (2)	Sunderland
13:00	Van Aanholt 33'	Report		Stadium: Stadium of Light; Attendance: 30,302; Referee: Mike Dean

4 January 2015	Queens Park Rangers (1)	0–3	Sheffield United (3)	Shepherd's Bush
13:00		Report	McNulty 36'; Campbell-Ryce 49', 90+4'	Stadium: Loftus Road; Attendance: 12,972; Referee: Mark Clattenburg

4 January 2015	Aston Villa (1)	1–0	Blackpool (2)	Birmingham
15:00	Benteke 88'	Report		Stadium: Villa Park; Attendance: 21,837; Referee: Chris Foy

4 January 2015	Manchester City (1)	2–1	Sheffield Wednesday (2)	Manchester
15:00	Milner 66', 90+1'	Report	Nuhiu 14'	Stadium: Etihad Stadium; Attendance: 44,309; Referee: Michael Oliver

4 January 2015	Southampton (1)	1–1	Ipswich Town (2)	Southampton
15:00	Schneiderlin 33'	Report	Ambrose 19'	Stadium: St Mary's Stadium; Attendance: 31,201; Referee: Martin Atkinson

14 January 2015 Replay	Ipswich Town (2)	0–1	Southampton (1)	Ipswich
19:55		Report	Long 19'	Stadium: Portman Road; Attendance: 27,933; Referee: Graham Scott

4 January 2015	Stoke City (1)	3–1	Wrexham (5)	Stoke-on-Trent
15:00	Arnautović 80'; Ireland 88', 90+3'	Report	Carrington 73'	Stadium: Britannia Stadium; Attendance: 19,423; Referee: Simon Hooper

4 January 2015	Yeovil Town (3)	0–2	Manchester United (1)	Yeovil
15:30		Report	Herrera 64'; Di María 90'	Stadium: Huish Park; Attendance: 9,264; Referee: Craig Pawson

4 January 2015	Chelsea (1)	3–0	Watford (2)	Fulham
16:00	Willian 58'; Rémy 70'; Zouma 72'	Report		Stadium: Stamford Bridge; Attendance: 41,010; Referee: Kevin Friend

4 January 2015	Arsenal (1)	2–0	Hull City (1)	Holloway
17:30	Mertesacker 20'; Sánchez 82'	Report		Stadium: Emirates Stadium; Attendance: 59,439; Referee: Robert Madley

5 January 2015	Burnley (1)	1–1	Tottenham Hotspur (1)	Burnley
19:45	Vokes 73'	Report	Chadli 56'	Stadium: Turf Moor; Attendance: 9,348; Referee: Roger East

14 January 2015 Replay	Tottenham Hotspur (1)	4–2	Burnley (1)	Tottenham
20:00	Paulinho 10'; Capoue 45+2'; Chiricheș 49'; Rose 52'	Report	Sordell 3'; Wallace 8'	Stadium: White Hart Lane; Attendance: 24,367; Referee: Craig Pawson

5 January 2015	AFC Wimbledon (4)	1–2	Liverpool (1)	Kingston upon Thames
19:55	Akinfenwa 36'	Report	Gerrard 12', 62'	Stadium: Kingsmeadow; Attendance: 4,784; Referee: Jonathan Moss

6 January 2015	Everton (1)	1–1	West Ham United (1)	Liverpool
19:45	Lukaku 90+1'	Report	Collins 56'	Stadium: Goodison Park; Attendance: 22,236; Referee: Anthony Taylor

13 January 2015 Replay	West Ham United (1)	2–2 (a.e.t.) (9–8 p)	Everton (1)	Upton Park
19:45	Valencia 51'; Cole 113'	Report	Mirallas 82'; Lukaku 97'	Stadium: Boleyn Ground; Attendance: 25,301; Referee: Neil Swarbrick
	Penalties
	Noble (penalty scored); Nolan (penalty scored); Carroll (penalty scored); Cresswell (penalty scored); Downing (penalty missed); Cole (penalty scored); Valencia (penalty scored); Amalfitano (penalty scored); Jenkinson (penalty scored); Adrián (penalty scored)		(penalty scored) Mirallas; (penalty missed) Naismith; (penalty scored) Lukaku; (penalty scored) Baines; (penalty scored) Oviedo; (penalty scored) Barry; (penalty scored) Stones; (penalty scored) Jagielka; (penalty scored) Coleman; (penalty missed) Robles

6 January 2015	Scunthorpe United (3)	2–2	Chesterfield (3)	Scunthorpe
19:45	Davey 18'; Taylor 44'	Report	Doyle 71' (pen.); O'Shea 85'	Stadium: Glanford Park; Attendance: 4,307; Referee: Mark Haywood

13 January 2015 Replay	Chesterfield (3)	2–0 (a.e.t.)	Scunthorpe United (3)	Chesterfield
19:45	Clucas 105', 116'	Report		Stadium: Proact Stadium; Attendance: 6,815; Referee: Keith Hill

== Fourth round proper ==
The fourth round draw took place on 5 January 2015 at 19:30, in the clubhouse of AFC Wimbledon at Kingsmeadow, Kingston upon Thames, and was broadcast live on BBC One. In the draw the title holders Arsenal drew a trip to Brighton against Brighton & Hove Albion while the lowest ranked side in this round, Cambridge United (who compete at level 4 of English football) drew Premier League club Manchester United. A total of 32 teams competed, all of which had progressed from the third round.

Number of teams per tier still in competition
Premier League	Championship	League One	League Two	Non-League	Total
15 / 20	10 / 24	6 / 24	1 / 24	0 / 32	32 / 124

23 January 2015	Cambridge United (4)	0–0	Manchester United (1)	Cambridge
19:55		Report		Stadium: Abbey Stadium; Attendance: 7,987; Referee: Chris Foy

3 February 2015 Replay	Manchester United (1)	3–0	Cambridge United (4)	Manchester
19:45	Mata 25'; Rojo 32'; Wilson 73'	Report		Stadium: Old Trafford; Attendance: 74,511; Referee: Jonathan Moss

24 January 2015	Blackburn Rovers (2)	3–1	Swansea City (1)	Blackburn
12:45	Taylor 23'; Gestede 78'; Conway 89'	Report	Sigurðsson 21'	Stadium: Ewood Park; Attendance: 5,928; Referee: Craig Pawson

24 January 2015	Southampton (1)	2–3	Crystal Palace (1)	Southampton
15:00	Pellè 9'; Dann 16' (o.g.)	Report	Chamakh 11', 39'; Sanogo 21'	Stadium: St Mary's Stadium; Attendance: 31,320; Referee: Jonathan Moss

24 January 2015	Chelsea (1)	2–4	Bradford City (3)	Fulham
15:00	Cahill 21'; Ramires 38'	Report	Stead 41'; Morais 75'; Halliday 82'; Yeates 90+4'	Stadium: Stamford Bridge; Attendance: 41,014; Referee: Andre Marriner

24 January 2015	Derby County (2)	2–0	Chesterfield (3)	Derby
15:00	Bent 20'; Hughes 82'	Report		Stadium: iPro Stadium; Attendance: 28,392; Referee: David Webb

24 January 2015	Preston North End (3)	1–1	Sheffield United (3)	Preston
15:00	Gallagher 19'	Report	De Girolamo 68'	Stadium: Deepdale; Attendance: 10,770; Referee: Keith Stroud

3 February 2015 Replay	Sheffield United (3)	1–3	Preston North End (3)	Sheffield
19:45	Murphy 38'	Report	Gallagher 63', 73' (pen.); Huntington 69'	Stadium: Bramall Lane; Attendance: 13,161; Referee: Lee Probert

24 January 2015	Birmingham City (2)	1–2	West Bromwich Albion (1)	Birmingham
15:00	Grounds 45+1'	Report	Anichebe 25', 35'	Stadium: St Andrew's; Attendance: 28,438; Referee: Mark Clattenburg

24 January 2015	Cardiff City (2)	1–2	Reading (2)	Cardiff
15:00	Jones 25'	Report	Norwood 64'; Robson-Kanu 88'	Stadium: Cardiff City Stadium; Attendance: 11,750; Referee: Lee Probert

24 January 2015	Tottenham Hotspur (1)	1–2	Leicester City (1)	Tottenham
15:00	Townsend 19' (pen.)	Report	Ulloa 83'; Schlupp 90+2'	Stadium: White Hart Lane; Attendance: 35,548; Referee: Robert Madley

24 January 2015	Sunderland (1)	0–0	Fulham (2)	Sunderland
15:00		Report		Stadium: Stadium of Light; Attendance: 22,961; Referee: Anthony Taylor

3 February 2015 Replay	Fulham (2)	1–3	Sunderland (1)	Fulham
19:45	Rodallega 28'	Report	Bettinelli 61' (o.g.); Álvarez 75'; Gómez 90+3' (pen.)	Stadium: Craven Cottage; Attendance: 14,777; Referee: Paul Tierney

24 January 2015	Manchester City (1)	0–2	Middlesbrough (2)	Manchester
15:00		Report	Bamford 53'; Kike 90+3'	Stadium: Etihad Stadium; Attendance: 44,836; Referee: Phil Dowd

24 January 2015	Liverpool (1)	0–0	Bolton Wanderers (2)	Liverpool
17:30		Report		Stadium: Anfield; Attendance: 43,847; Referee: Kevin Friend

4 February 2015 Replay	Bolton Wanderers (2)	1–2	Liverpool (1)	Bolton
19:45	Guðjohnsen 59' (pen.)	Report	Sterling 86'; Coutinho 90'	Stadium: Macron Stadium; Attendance: 22,171; Referee: Roger East

25 January 2015	Bristol City (3)	0–1 (Note: West Ham were fined £71,000 for fielding Diafra Sakho after he had been withdrawn from the Senegal squad for the 2015 African Cup of Nations. However, they were allowed to remain in the competition.)	West Ham United (1)	Bristol
14:00		Report	Sakho 81'	Stadium: Ashton Gate; Attendance: 12,682; Referee: Lee Mason

25 January 2015	Aston Villa (1)	2–1	Bournemouth (2)	Birmingham
15:00	Gil 51'; Weimann 71'	Report	Wilson 90+3'	Stadium: Villa Park; Attendance: 27,415; Referee: Mike Dean

25 January 2015	Brighton & Hove Albion (2)	2–3	Arsenal (1)	Brighton
16:00	O'Grady 50'; Baldock 75'	Report	Walcott 2'; Özil 24'; Rosický 59'	Stadium: Falmer Stadium; Attendance: 30,278; Referee: Michael Oliver

26 January 2015	Rochdale (3)	1–4	Stoke City (1)	Rochdale
20:00	Bennett 78'	Report	Krkić 4'; Ireland 52'; Moses 61'; Walters 90+3'	Stadium: Spotland Stadium; Attendance: 7,443; Referee: Martin Atkinson

== Fifth round proper ==
The fifth round draw took place on 26 January 2015 at 19:20 on The One Show, which was broadcast live on BBC One, and the matches took place between 14 and 16 February 2015. In the draw, title holders Arsenal drew Middlesbrough (who eliminated Manchester City in fourth round) and Bradford City (who eliminated Chelsea in fourth round) were rewarded a home tie against Sunderland. The lowest ranked sides in this round were Bradford City and Preston North End (who competed at level 3 of English football)

Number of teams per tier still in competition
Premier League	Championship	League One	League Two	Non-League	Total
10 / 20	4 / 24	2 / 24	0 / 24	0 / 32	16 / 124

14 February 2015	West Bromwich Albion (1)	4–0	West Ham United (1)	West Bromwich
12:45	Ideye 20', 57'; Morrison 42'; Berahino 72'	Report		Stadium: The Hawthorns; Attendance: 19,956; Referee: Martin Atkinson

14 February 2015	Blackburn Rovers (2)	4–1	Stoke City (1)	Blackburn
15:00	King 36', 50', 55'; Gestede 45+7' (pen.)	Report	Crouch 10'	Stadium: Ewood Park; Attendance: 13,934; Referee: Anthony Taylor

14 February 2015	Derby County (2)	1–2	Reading (2)	Derby
15:00	Bent 61'	Report	Robson-Kanu 53'; Yakubu 82'	Stadium: iPro Stadium; Attendance: 21,337; Referee: Craig Pawson

14 February 2015	Crystal Palace (1)	1–2	Liverpool (1)	Selhurst
17:30	Campbell 15'	Report	Sturridge 49'; Lallana 58'	Stadium: Selhurst Park; Attendance: 20,391; Referee: Robert Madley

15 February 2015	Aston Villa (1)	2–1	Leicester City (1)	Birmingham
12:30	Bacuna 68'; Sinclair 89'	Report	Kramarić 90+1'	Stadium: Villa Park; Attendance: 28,098; Referee: Mark Clattenburg

15 February 2015	Bradford City (3)	2–0	Sunderland (1)	Bradford
14:30	O'Shea 3' (o.g.); Stead 61'	Report		Stadium: Coral Windows Stadium; Attendance: 24,021; Referee: Kevin Friend

15 February 2015	Arsenal (1)	2–0	Middlesbrough (2)	Holloway
16:00	Giroud 27', 29'	Report		Stadium: Emirates Stadium; Attendance: 59,823; Referee: Mike Dean

16 February 2015	Preston North End (3)	1–3	Manchester United (1)	Preston
19:45	Laird 47'	Report	Herrera 65'; Fellaini 72'; Rooney 88' (pen.)	Stadium: Deepdale; Attendance: 21,348; Referee: Phil Dowd

== Sixth round proper ==
The sixth round draw took place on 16 February 2015 at 19:35 on BBC One, and the regular matches were played between 7 and 9 March. The lowest ranked side in this round were Bradford City (who competed at level 3 of English football).

Number of teams per tier still in competition
Premier League	Championship	League One	League Two	Non-League	Total
5 / 20	2 / 24	1 / 24	0 / 24	0 / 32	8 / 124

7 March 2015	Bradford City (3)	0–0	Reading (2)	Bradford
12:45 GMT		Report		Stadium: Coral Windows Stadium; Attendance: 24,321; Referee: Neil Swarbrick

16 March 2015 Replay	Reading (2)	3–0	Bradford City (3)	Reading
19:45 GMT	Robson-Kanu 6'; McCleary 9'; Mackie 68'	Report		Stadium: Madejski Stadium; Attendance: 22,908; Referee: Mike Jones

7 March 2015	Aston Villa (1)	2–0	West Bromwich Albion (1)	Birmingham
17:30 GMT	Delph 51'; Sinclair 85'	Report		Stadium: Villa Park; Attendance: 39,592; Referee: Anthony Taylor

8 March 2015	Liverpool (1)	0–0	Blackburn Rovers (2)	Liverpool
16:00 GMT		Report		Stadium: Anfield; Attendance: 43,820; Referee: Andre Marriner

8 April 2015 Replay	Blackburn Rovers (2)	0–1	Liverpool (1)	Blackburn
19:45 BST		Report	Coutinho 70'	Stadium: Ewood Park; Attendance: 28,415; Referee: Kevin Friend

9 March 2015	Manchester United (1)	1–2	Arsenal (1)	Manchester
19:45 GMT	Rooney 29'	Report	Monreal 25'; Welbeck 61'	Stadium: Old Trafford; Attendance: 74,285; Referee: Michael Oliver

== Semi-finals ==
The semi-final draw took place on 9 March 2015 at approximately 21:45, at Old Trafford, Manchester, and was broadcast on BBC One after the match between Manchester United and Arsenal. In the draw, title holders Arsenal drew Reading, while Aston Villa drew Liverpool. The matches were played at Wembley Stadium on 18 and 19 April 2015. The lowest ranked side in this round were Reading (who competed at level 2 of English football).

Number of teams per tier still in competition
Premier League	Championship	League One	League Two	Non-League	Total
3 / 20	1 / 24	0 / 24	0 / 24	0 / 32	4 / 124

18 April 2015	Reading (2)	1–2 (a.e.t.)	Arsenal (1)	Wembley
17:20 BST	McCleary 54'	Report	Sánchez 40', 105+1'	Stadium: Wembley Stadium; Attendance: 84,081; Referee: Martin Atkinson

19 April 2015	Aston Villa (1)	2–1	Liverpool (1)	Wembley
15:00 BST	Benteke 36'; Delph 54'	Report	Coutinho 30'	Stadium: Wembley Stadium; Attendance: 85,416; Referee: Michael Oliver

== Final ==
Number of teams per tier still in competition
Premier League	Championship	League One	League Two	Non-League	Total
2 / 20	0 / 24	0 / 24	0 / 24	0 / 32	2 / 124

30 May 2015
17:30 BST

Arsenal	4–0	Aston Villa
Walcott 40'; Sánchez 50'; Mertesacker 62'; Giroud 90+3'	Report, positions, nationalities

Wembley Stadium, London
Attendance: 89,283
Referee: Jon Moss (West Yorkshire)

== Top scorers ==
Rank	Player	Club	Goals
1	(England) Saido Berahino	West Bromwich Albion	5
1	(Scotland) Paul Gallagher	Preston North End	5
1	(England) Jon Stead	Bradford City	5
4	(England) Robert Dale	Blyth Spartans	4
4	(Chile) Alexis Sánchez	Arsenal	4
6	22 players		3

== Broadcasting rights ==
The domestic broadcasting rights for the competition were held by the BBC and subscription channel BT Sport. The BBC regained the rights from ITV after six years, while BT Sport extended its existing deal carried over from obtaining ESPN's rights in February 2013. The FA Cup Final had to be broadcast live on UK terrestrial television under the Ofcom code of protected sporting events. Welsh language channel S4C broadcast the first round proper match between Wrexham and Woking. This was the only FA Cup match of the season that S4C broadcast.

These matches were broadcast live on UK television:

Round	Date	Teams	Kick-off	Channels	
Round	Date	Teams	Kick-off	Digital	TV
First round	7 November	Warrington Town v Exeter City	19:55	BBC iPlayer	BBC Two
First round	8 November	Wrexham v Woking	14:00	S4C Clic	S4C
First round	9 November	FC Halifax Town v Bradford City	12:00	BT Sport App	BT Sport 1
First round	10 November	Havant & Waterlooville v Preston North End	20:00	BT Sport App	BT Sport 1
First round (Replay)	19 November	Aldershot Town v Portsmouth	19:45	BT Sport App	BT Sport 1
First round (Replay)	20 November	Maidstone United v Stevenage	19:45	BT Sport App	BT Sport 1
Second round	5 December	Hartlepool United v Blyth Spartans	19:55	BBC iPlayer	BBC Two
Second round	6 December	Wrexham v Maidstone United	17:30	BBC iPlayer	BBC Two Wales
Second round	7 December	Gateshead v Warrington Town	12:00	BT Sport App	BT Sport 1
Second round	7 December	Colchester United v Peterborough United	16:30	BT Sport App	BT Sport 1
Second round (Replay)	16 December	Chester v Barnsley	19:45	BT Sport App	BT Sport 1
Second round (Replay)	17 December	Worcester City v Scunthorpe United	19:45	BT Sport App	BT Sport 1
Third round	2 January	Cardiff City v Colchester United	19:45	BBC iPlayer	BBC Two Wales
Third round	4 January	Dover Athletic v Crystal Palace	13:00	BT Sport App	BT Sport 1
Third round	4 January	Yeovil Town v Manchester United	15:30	BT Sport App	BT Sport 1
Third round	4 January	Arsenal v Hull City	17:30	BBC iPlayer	BBC One
Third round	5 January	AFC Wimbledon v Liverpool	19:55	BBC iPlayer	BBC One
Third round	6 January	Everton v West Ham United	19:45	BT Sport App	BT Sport 1
Third round (Replay)	13 January	West Ham United v Everton	19:45	BT Sport App	BT Sport 1
Third round (Replay)	14 January	Ipswich Town v Southampton	19:55	BBC iPlayer	BBC One
Fourth round	23 January	Cambridge United v Manchester United	19:55	BBC iPlayer	BBC One
Fourth round	24 January	Blackburn Rovers v Swansea City	12:45	BBC iPlayer	BBC Two Wales
Fourth round	24 January	Liverpool v Bolton Wanderers	19:30	BT Sport App	BT Sport 1
Fourth round	25 January	Bristol City v West Ham United	14:00	BBC iPlayer	BBC One
Fourth round	25 January	Brighton and Hove Albion v Arsenal	16:00	BT Sport App	BT Sport 1
Fourth round	26 January	Rochdale v Stoke City	20:00	BT Sport App	BT Sport 1
Fourth round (Replay)	3 February	Manchester United v Cambridge United	19:45	BT Sport App	BT Sport 1
Fourth round (Replay)	4 February	Bolton Wanderers v Liverpool	19:45	BBC iPlayer	BBC One
Fifth round	14 February	West Bromwich Albion v West Ham United	12:45	BT Sport App	BT Sport 1
Fifth round	14 February	Crystal Palace v Liverpool	17:30	BT Sport App	BT Sport 1
Fifth round	15 February	Aston Villa v Leicester City	12:30	BBC iPlayer	BBC One
Fifth round	15 February	Arsenal v Middlesbrough	16:00	BT Sport App	BT Sport 1
Fifth round	16 February	Preston North End v Manchester United	19:45	BBC iPlayer	BBC One
Sixth round	7 March	Bradford City v Reading	12:45	BT Sport App	BT Sport 1
Sixth round	7 March	Aston Villa v West Bromwich Albion	17:30	BBC iPlayer	BBC One
Sixth round	8 March	Liverpool v Blackburn Rovers	16:00	BT Sport App	BT Sport 1
Sixth round	9 March	Manchester United v Arsenal	19:45	BBC iPlayer	BBC One
Sixth round (Replay)	16 March	Reading v Bradford City	19:45	BBC iPlayer	BBC One
Sixth round (Replay)	8 April	Blackburn Rovers v Liverpool	19:45	BT Sport App	BT Sport 1
Semi-finals	18 April	Reading v Arsenal	17:20	BBC iPlayer	BBC One
Semi-finals	19 April	Aston Villa v Liverpool	15:00	BT Sport App	BT Sport 1
Final	30 May	Arsenal v Aston Villa	17:30	BBC iPlayer	BBC One
Final	30 May	Arsenal v Aston Villa	17:30	BT Sport App	BT Sport 1

=== International broadcasters ===
Country	Broadcaster
Albania	Tring Sport
Belgium	Sporting Telenet
Brazil	ESPN Brasil
Canada	Sportsnet World
Denmark	SBS Discovery Channel (Kanal 5, 6'eren, 7'eren)
France	beIN Sport
India	Star Sports
Italy	Fox Sports
Nepal	Star Sports
Netherlands	Fox Sports
Norway	TV2
Sweden	TV10
United States	Fox Sports
Latvia	Viasat sport Baltic
