= 2014 Conference Premier play-off final =

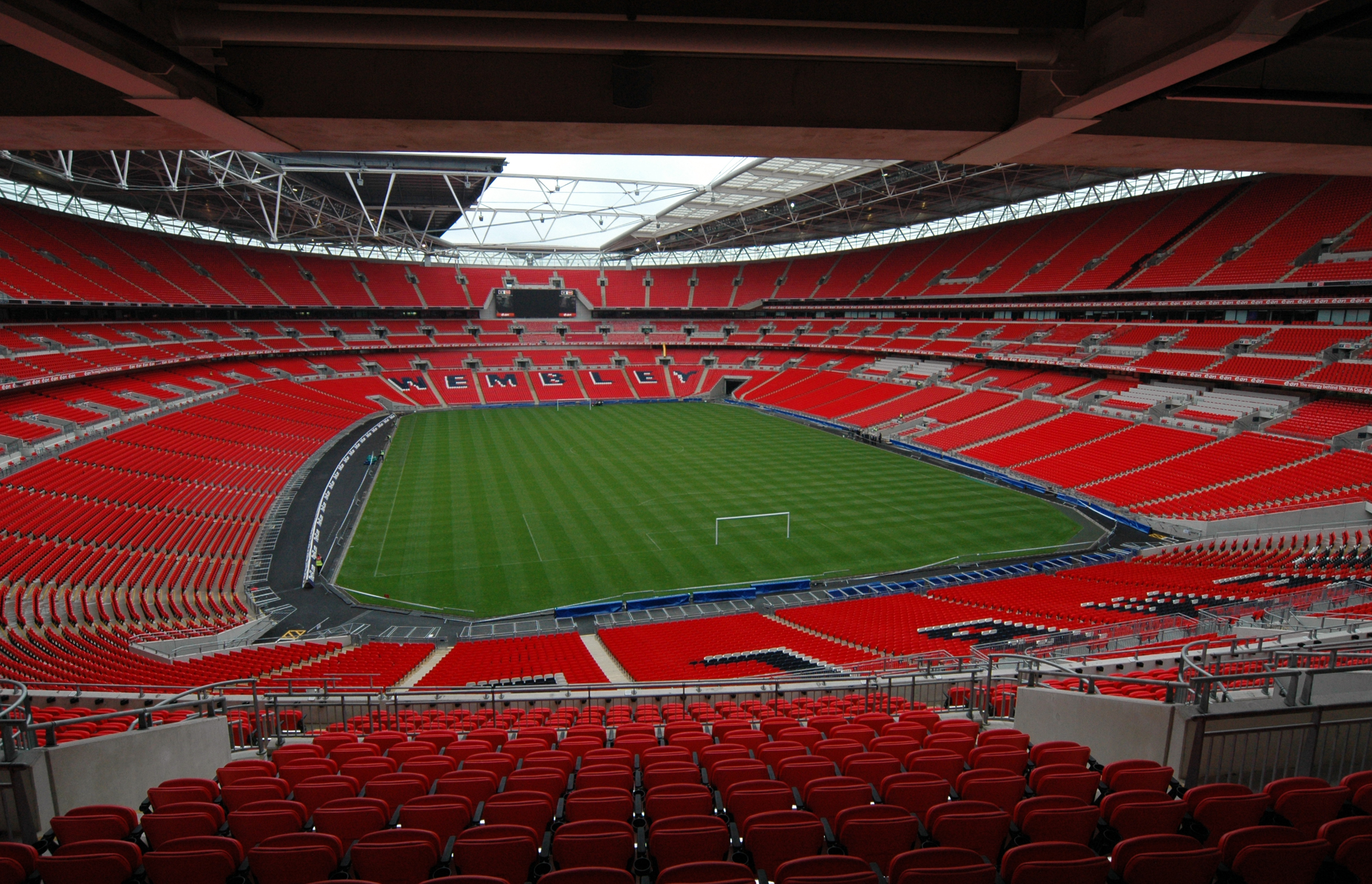
- Wembley Stadium hosted the final
- Event: 2013–14 Football Conference
Cambridge United	Gateshead
2	1
- Date: 18 May 2014
- Venue: Wembley Stadium, London
- Man of the Match: Ryan Donaldson (Cambridge United)
- Referee: Peter Bankes
- Attendance: 19,613

The 2014 Conference Premier play-off final, known as the 2014 Skrill Premier play-off final for sponsorship reasons, was a football match between Cambridge United and Gateshead on 18 May 2014 at Wembley Stadium in London. It was the twelfth Conference Premier play-off final.

Cambridge secured a place in the final after beating FC Halifax Town 2–1 on aggregate. Gateshead's place was secured after beating Grimsby Town 4–2 over two legs. This was Cambridge United's 3rd Conference play-off final after losing in 2008 and 2009 and Gateshead's first ever Conference play-off final and their first ever visit to Wembley Stadium.

Cambridge United won the game 2–1 and were promoted to the 2014–15 Football League Two.

== Route to the final ==
Pos	Team	Pld	W	D	L	GF	GA	GD	Pts
2	Cambridge United	46	23	13	10	72	35	+37	82
3	Gateshead	46	22	13	11	72	50	+22	79
4	Grimsby Town	46	22	12	12	65	46	+19	78
5	FC Halifax Town	46	22	11	13	85	58	+27	77

=== Semi-finals ===
First leg

30 April 2014	FC Halifax Town	1–0	Cambridge United	The Shay, Halifax
19:45	Gregory 83' (pen.)	Report		Attendance: 3,668; Referee: Simon Bennett

1 May 2014	Grimsby Town	1–1	Gateshead	Blundell Park, Cleethorpes
19:45	Disley 24'	Report	Larkin 7'	Attendance: 5,234; Referee: Chris Kavanagh

Second leg

4 May 2014	Cambridge United	2–0 (2–1 agg.)	FC Halifax Town	Abbey Stadium, Cambridge
13:30	Sam-Yorke 11', 38'	Report		Attendance: 6,262; Referee: Darren Handley

4 May 2014	Gateshead	3–1 (4–2 agg.)	Grimsby Town	Gateshead International Stadium, Gateshead
16:30	Marwood 22', 84'; O'Donnell 90+4'	Report	Disley 60'	Attendance: 8,144; Referee: Kevin Johnson

== Match ==
=== Details ===
18 May 2014
16:00 BST

Cambridge United	2–1	Gateshead
Hughes 51'; Donaldson 71'	BBC Report	Lester 80'

Wembley Stadium, London
Attendance: 19,613
Referee: Peter Banks

Cambridge United	Gateshead

GK	25	Adam Smith
RB	2	Kevin Roberts
CB	6	Ian Miller (c)
CB	4	Josh Coulson
LB	3	Greg Taylor
CM	8	Tom Champion	(yellow card) 20'
CM	18	Luke Berry		(substituted off) 66'
RM	7	Ryan Donaldson
LS	10	Tom Elliott		(substituted off) 77'
RS	19	Delano Sam-Yorke		(substituted off) 46'
LM	17	Liam Hughes
Substitutes:
DF	5	Tom Bonner
MF	11	Harrison Dunk		(substituted on) 46'
MF	22	Luke Chadwick		(substituted on) 66'
MF	23	Ashley Chambers
FW	9	Adam Cunnington		(substituted on) 77'
Manager:
Richard Money

GK	1	Adam Bartlett
RB	16	Craig Baxter
CB	5	James Curtis
CB	6	Ben Clark (c)	(yellow card) 70'
LB	2	Carl Magnay
CM	4	Jamie Chandler		(substituted off) 69'
CM	8	Phil Turnbull
CM	29	John Oster	(yellow card) 23'
RW	25	Marcus Maddison	(yellow card) 7'	(substituted off) 58'
ST	18	James Marwood
LW	7	Colin Larkin		(substituted off) 58'
Substitutes:
MF	17	Josh Walker
MF	21	Rob Ramshaw
MF	38	JJ O'Donnell		(substituted on) 58'
FW	9	Liam Hatch		(substituted on) 58'
FW	19	Jack Lester		(substituted on) 69'
Manager:
Gary Mills

Man of the match:

- Ryan Donaldson (Cambridge United)

Match officials:

- Referee: Peter Bankes
- Assistant referees:
  - Jake Collin (Liverpool)
  - Mick McDonough (Northumberland)
- Fourth official: Kevin Friend (Leicestershire)
- Reserve official: Simon Bennett (Staffordshire)

Match rules:

- 90 minutes.
- 30 minutes of extra time if necessary.
- Penalty shoot-out if scores still level.
- Five named substitutes.
- Maximum of three substitutions.
