= 2013–14 Football Conference =

Football Conference
- Season: 2013–14

The 2013–14 Football Conference season was the tenth season with the Conference consisting of three divisions and the thirty-fourth season overall. The Conference covers the top two levels of Non-League football in England. The Conference Premier is the fifth highest level of the overall pyramid, whilst the Conference North and Conference South exist at the sixth level. The top team and the winner of the playoff of the Premier division will be promoted to Football League Two, while the bottom four are relegated to the North or South divisions. The champions of the North and South divisions will be promoted to the Premier division, alongside the play-off winners from each division. The bottom three in each of the North and South divisions are relegated to the premier divisions of the Northern Premier League, Isthmian League or Southern League.

Skrill sponsored the Conference for this season and the divisions were known as the Skrill Premier, the Skrill North and the Skrill South. Skrill terminated the sponsorship deal early, meaning a new title sponsor must be found for next season.

== Conference Premier ==
Conference Premier
- Season: 2013–14
- Champions: Luton Town
- Promoted: Luton Town; Cambridge United
- Relegated: Tamworth; Hyde; Salisbury City; Hereford United
- Matches: 552
- Goals: 1,491 (2.7 per match)
- Top goalscorer: (Jamaica) Andre Gray (30 goals)
- Biggest home win: Forest Green Rovers 8–0 Hyde
- Biggest away win: Alfreton Town 0–5 Luton Town; Nuneaton Town 0–5 Luton Town
- Highest scoring: Cambridge United 7–2 Hyde; Forest Green Rovers 8–0 Hyde; Kidderminster Harriers 5–3 Tamworth; Hyde 2–6 Forest Green Rovers
- Longest winning run: 7 games Luton Town
- Longest unbeaten run: 27 games Luton Town
- Longest winless run: 26 games Hyde
- Longest losing run: 12 games Hyde
- Average attendance: 1863

A total of 24 teams contest the division, including 18 sides from last season, two relegated from the Football League Two, two promoted from the Conference North and two promoted from the Conference South. Of the 24 clubs, 14 employed their players as full-time professionals, namely Aldershot, Barnet, Cambridge, Forest Green, Gateshead, Grimsby, Hereford, Kidderminster, Lincoln, Luton, Macclesfield, Salisbury, Tamworth and Wrexham. The remainder were semi-professional, training two or three times a week.

=== Promotion and relegation ===
Teams promoted from 2012–13 Conference North

- Chester (League Champions)
- FC Halifax Town (Playoff Winners)

Teams promoted from 2012–13 Conference South

- Welling United (League Champions)
- Salisbury City (Playoff Winners)

Teams relegated from 2012–13 Football League Two

- Barnet
- Aldershot Town

=== League table ===
Pos	Team	Pld	W	D	L	GF	GA	GD	Pts	Promotion, qualification or relegation
1	Luton Town (C, P)	46	30	11	5	102	35	+67	101	Promotion to Football League Two
2	Cambridge United (O, P)	46	23	13	10	72	35	+37	82	Qualification for the Conference Premier play-offs
3	Gateshead	46	22	13	11	72	50	+22	79	Qualification for the Conference Premier play-offs
4	Grimsby Town	46	22	12	12	65	46	+19	78	Qualification for the Conference Premier play-offs
5	FC Halifax Town	46	22	11	13	85	58	+27	77	Qualification for the Conference Premier play-offs
6	Braintree Town	46	21	11	14	57	39	+18	74	
7	Kidderminster Harriers	46	20	12	14	66	59	+7	72	
8	Barnet	46	19	13	14	58	53	+5	70	
9	Woking	46	20	8	18	66	69	−3	68	
10	Forest Green Rovers	46	19	10	17	80	66	+14	67	
11	Alfreton Town	46	21	7	18	69	74	−5	67 (Note: Alfreton Town were deducted three points for fielding an ineligible player.)	
12	Salisbury City	46	19	10	17	58	63	−5	67 (Note: On 13 June 2014, Salisbury City were demoted to the Conference South due to financial irregularities. Because of this, Dartford were reprieved from relegation. Salisbury were subsequently expelled from the Football Conference altogether on 4 July 2014, after which they went into liquidation.)	Club expelled & folded
13	Nuneaton Town	46	18	12	16	54	60	−6	66	
14	Lincoln City	46	17	14	15	60	59	+1	65	
15	Macclesfield Town	46	18	7	21	62	63	−1	61	
16	Welling United	46	16	12	18	59	61	−2	60	
17	Wrexham	46	16	11	19	61	61	0	59	
18	Southport	46	14	11	21	53	71	−18	53	
19	Aldershot Town	46	16	13	17	69	62	+7	51 (Note: Aldershot Town were deducted ten points for entering administration.)	
20	Hereford United (R)	46	13	12	21	44	63	−19	51 (Note: On 10 June 2014, Hereford United were expelled from the Conference due to financial irregularities. They were later accepted into the Southern League. Because of this, Chester were reprieved from relegation.)	Demoted to the Southern League Premier Division
21	Chester	46	12	15	19	49	70	−21	51	
22	Dartford	46	12	8	26	49	74	−25	44	
23	Tamworth (R)	46	10	9	27	43	81	−38	39	Relegation to Conference North
24	Hyde (R)	46	1	7	38	38	119	−81	10	Relegation to Conference North

Source: Football Conference
Rules for classification: 1) points; 2) goal difference; 3) number of goals scored.
(C) Champions; (O) Play-off winners; (P) Promoted; (R) Relegated

=== Play-offs ===
Semifinals
2	Cambridge United	0	2	2
5	FC Halifax Town	1	0	1
3	Gateshead	1	3	4
4	Grimsby Town	1	1	2

Final
2	Cambridge United	2
3	Gateshead	1

==== First leg ====
30 April 2014	FC Halifax Town	1–0	Cambridge United	The Shay, Halifax
19:45	Gregory 83' (pen.)	Report		Attendance: 3,668; Referee: Simon Bennett

1 May 2014	Grimsby Town	1–1	Gateshead	Blundell Park, Cleethorpes
19:45	Disley 24'	Report	Larkin 7'	Attendance: 5,234; Referee: Chris Kavanagh

==== Second leg ====
4 May 2014	Cambridge United	2–0 (2–1 agg.)	FC Halifax Town	Abbey Stadium, Cambridge
13:30	Sam-Yorke 11', 38'	Report		Attendance: 6,262; Referee: Darren Handley

4 May 2014	Gateshead	3–1 (4–2 agg.)	Grimsby Town	Gateshead International Stadium, Gateshead
16:30	Marwood 22', 84'; O'Donnell 90+4'	Report	Disley 60'	Attendance: 8,144; Referee: Kevin Johnson

==== Final ====
18 May 2014	Cambridge United	2–1	Gateshead	Wembley Stadium, London
16:00	Hughes 51'; Donaldson 71'	BBC Report	Lester 80'	Attendance: 19,613; Referee: Peter Banks

=== Stadia and locations ===
Locations of the Conference Premier 2013–14 teams

Team	Stadium	Capacity
Wrexham	Racecourse Ground	15,500
FC Halifax Town	The Shay	14,061
Gateshead	Gateshead International Stadium	11,800
Luton Town	Kenilworth Road	10,226
Lincoln City	Sincil Bank	10,120
Cambridge United	Abbey Stadium	9,617
Grimsby Town	Blundell Park	9,546
Aldershot Town	EBB Stadium	7,100
Macclesfield Town	Moss Rose	6,355
Kidderminster Harriers	Aggborough	6,238
Woking	Kingfield Stadium	6,036
Southport	Haig Avenue	6,008
Chester	Deva Stadium	6,000
Hereford United	Edgar Street	5,966
Forest Green Rovers	The New Lawn	5,147
Barnet	The Hive Stadium	5,100
Salisbury City	The Raymond McEnhill Stadium	5,000
Nuneaton Town	Liberty Way	4,314
Hyde	Ewen Fields	4,250
Braintree Town	Cressing Road	4,145
Dartford	Princes Park	4,100
Tamworth	The Lamb Ground	4,000
Welling United	Park View Road	4,000
Alfreton Town	North Street	3,600

=== Results ===
Home \ Away	ALD	ALF	BAR	BRA	CAM	CHR	DAR	HAL	FGR	GAT	GRI	HER	HYD	KID	LIN	LUT	MAC	NUN	SAL	SOU	TAM	WEL	WOK	WRE
Aldershot Town		2–3	3–3	2–1	0–1	2–0	3–0	2–2	2–2	1–2	0–3	1–2	1–0	0–0	2–3	3–3	1–0	2–2	3–2	5–1	6–0	3–1	2–1	2–0
Alfreton Town	1–4		3–1	3–1	1–1	0–1	2–1	3–0	3–2	1–1	3–3	2–1	3–0	3–1	1–1	0–5	0–1	1–1	3–2	2–1	4–2	2–2	3–1	1–0
Barnet	1–3	1–0		1–1	2–2	3–0	1–0	0–4	2–1	0–1	2–1	2–0	3–2	1–0	1–1	1–2	1–2	1–1	3–1	1–0	1–0	0–0	1–3	1–1
Braintree Town	1–0	3–1	0–3		1–0	3–0	1–0	1–0	1–1	0–0	0–0	1–1	2–1	0–1	0–2	1–2	0–1	2–1	0–1	1–0	2–0	2–3	2–0	3–0
Cambridge United	4–0	0–1	1–1	1–0		0–1	1–1	5–1	2–1	1–0	1–2	1–0	7–2	5–1	1–0	1–1	3–0	3–0	2–0	3–1	3–0	2–1	2–0	0–0
Chester	1–1	0–1	2–1	0–2	0–0		0–0	2–1	1–2	1–1	0–0	0–2	3–2	0–0	3–3	1–1	2–1	3–3	2–2	2–2	2–0	1–3	0–2	0–0
Dartford	1–1	1–0	0–2	0–2	3–3	0–1		1–2	0–1	0–1	1–0	2–0	4–3	3–0	1–2	1–2	2–1	1–2	1–1	1–0	2–3	1–2	5–1	1–5
FC Halifax Town	4–0	2–0	2–1	0–0	1–1	2–1	2–0		1–0	3–3	4–0	1–1	4–0	1–1	5–1	2–0	2–1	2–2	5–1	1–0	2–0	3–0	3–4	3–2
Forest Green Rovers	3–1	3–1	1–2	0–2	3–2	3–0	1–0	2–1		1–0	2–1	1–1	8–0	1–1	4–1	0–0	2–3	1–0	4–0	3–1	1–2	0–0	2–2	1–1
Gateshead	0–0	3–0	1–2	1–0	2–0	3–2	2–0	1–1	1–1		1–2	2–1	4–0	3–1	3–1	0–0	2–2	2–1	3–2	2–2	5–0	1–1	0–2	0–3
Grimsby Town	1–1	3–1	2–1	1–0	0–1	2–1	5–2	0–1	3–1	2–2		1–1	1–0	3–1	1–1	1–2	2–3	1–2	2–0	0–0	3–1	1–1	2–2	3–1
Hereford United	0–2	3–2	0–1	1–1	1–0	2–2	2–2	3–2	1–0	0–1	0–1		0–0	1–1	1–0	0–0	1–2	0–1	1–0	4–1	1–0	2–1	0–2	0–2
Hyde	2–2	1–2	0–1	0–3	0–1	1–2	0–2	1–5	2–6	0–2	0–1	2–2		1–3	3–4	0–1	0–3	2–2	0–2	1–2	0–3	0–1	0–2	2–5
Kidderminster Harriers	0–0	1–3	1–0	2–2	2–0	3–1	1–2	2–0	4–1	3–1	0–1	2–1	2–1		4–1	0–2	2–1	0–0	3–0	1–1	5–3	2–0	2–0	3–1
Lincoln City	0–1	4–1	3–3	2–0	1–0	1–1	0–0	3–1	2–1	0–1	0–2	1–1	3–0	2–0		0–0	1–0	1–2	0–1	1–0	0–0	1–2	2–2	2–0
Luton Town	1–0	3–0	2–1	2–3	0–0	3–0	3–0	4–3	4–1	4–2	0–0	7–0	4–1	6–0	3–2		1–1	3–0	2–0	3–0	2–0	2–1	0–1	5–0
Macclesfield Town	1–1	0–1	2–0	0–1	0–1	3–2	3–1	2–2	1–2	0–2	1–1	1–0	3–0	1–1	3–1	1–2		0–1	1–0	2–2	2–1	2–1	3–2	3–2
Nuneaton Town	2–1	3–0	0–1	1–1	0–0	1–0	3–1	0–1	1–1	1–4	0–1	2–1	1–0	2–1	2–2	0–5	1–0		1–2	3–1	1–0	2–0	0–2	2–0
Salisbury City	1–0	0–0	2–1	1–1	0–3	3–1	1–0	3–1	1–4	0–0	1–0	4–1	2–0	1–1	1–2	0–0	3–2	2–1		1–1	0–1	3–0	2–0	2–1
Southport	1–0	2–1	1–1	0–4	1–0	0–0	3–0	2–1	2–0	2–1	2–1	0–3	1–1	1–2	0–1	1–0	4–1	1–0	3–1		2–0	2–2	1–1	1–2
Tamworth	1–0	1–0	0–0	0–0	0–1	3–4	0–2	2–0	1–2	0–1	0–2	1–0	1–1	0–3	0–0	3–4	1–0	1–1	1–2	4–1		1–1	2–4	2–2
Welling United	1–0	1–2	1–1	0–2	2–2	2–0	1–1	0–1	5–2	2–0	1–0	0–1	0–2	1–2	1–0	1–2	1–0	1–2	0–0	4–3	2–0		3–0	1–1
Woking	1–2	2–1	0–0	1–0	0–3	0–1	3–0	0–0	2–1	1–2	1–2	3–0	3–2	1–0	0–0	0–4	3–2	2–0	1–3	2–0	2–2	2–4		2–1
Wrexham	2–1	2–3	0–1	2–3	1–1	0–2	1–2	0–0	2–0	3–2	0–1	2–0	2–2	0–0	0–1	2–0	1–0	3–0	1–1	1–0	2–0	2–1	2–0	

Updated to match(es) played on 26 April 2014. Source: Football Conference
Legend: Blue = home team win; Yellow = draw; Red = away team win.

=== Top scorers ===
As of 26 April 2014.

Rank	Player	Club	Goals
1	(Jamaica) Andre Gray	Luton Town	30
2	(England) Lee Gregory	FC Halifax Town	29
3	(England) Brett Williams	Aldershot Town	24
4	(England) James Norwood	Forest Green Rovers	18
4	(England) John Akinde	Alfreton Town	18
4	(England) Scott Boden	Macclesfield Town	18
4	(England) Ben Tomlinson	Lincoln City	18
8	(England) Paul Benson	Luton Town	17
8	(England) Louis Moult	Nuneaton Town	17
8	(England) Scott Rendell	Woking	17

== Conference North ==
Conference North
- Season: 2013–14
- Champions: AFC Telford United
- Promoted: Altrincham
- Relegated: Histon; Workington

=== Promotion and relegation ===
Teams promoted from 2012–13 Northern Premier League Premier Division

- North Ferriby United (League Champions)
- Hednesford Town (Playoff Winners)

Teams promoted from 2012–13 Southern League Premier Division

- Leamington

Teams relegated from 2012–13 Conference Premier

- Stockport County
- Barrow
- AFC Telford United

On 4 April 2014, the Football Conference confirmed that they had accepted the resignation of Vauxhall Motors from the league and that, as a result, only the bottom two clubs would be relegated.

This season proved to be the lowest league position Stockport County have been in their history

=== League table ===
Pos	Team	Pld	W	D	L	GF	GA	GD	Pts	Promotion, qualification or relegation
1	AFC Telford United (C, P)	42	25	10	7	82	53	+29	85	Promotion to Conference Premier
2	North Ferriby United	42	24	10	8	80	51	+29	82	Qualification for the Conference North play-offs
3	Altrincham (O, P)	42	24	9	9	95	51	+44	81	Qualification for the Conference North play-offs
4	Hednesford Town	42	24	6	12	87	65	+22	78	Qualification for the Conference North play-offs
5	Guiseley	42	23	9	10	78	56	+22	78	Qualification for the Conference North play-offs
6	Boston United	42	20	12	10	85	60	+25	72	
7	Brackley Town	42	18	15	9	66	45	+21	69	
8	Solihull Moors	42	17	14	11	63	52	+11	65	
9	Harrogate Town	42	19	9	14	75	59	+16	63 (Note: Harrogate Town were deducted three points for fielding an ineligible player.)	
10	Bradford (Park Avenue)	42	15	12	15	66	70	−4	57	
11	Barrow	42	14	14	14	50	56	−6	56	
12	Colwyn Bay	42	14	12	16	63	67	−4	54	
13	Leamington	42	13	13	16	54	53	+1	52	
14	Stockport County	42	12	14	16	58	57	+1	50	
15	Worcester City	42	13	11	18	40	53	−13	50	
16	Gainsborough Trinity	42	13	6	23	67	86	−19	45	
17	Gloucester City	42	11	11	20	64	77	−13	44	
18	Vauxhall Motors (D, R)	42	12	8	22	43	74	−31	44	Resigned to the West Cheshire League
19	Stalybridge Celtic	42	10	9	23	57	88	−31	39	
20	Oxford City	42	9	13	20	50	70	−20	37 (Note: Oxford City were deducted three points for fielding an ineligible player.)	
21	Histon (R)	42	7	11	24	42	76	−34	32	Relegation to the Southern League Premier Division
22	Workington (R)	42	6	10	26	39	85	−46	28	Relegation to the Northern Premier League Premier Division

Source: Football Conference
Rules for classification: 1) points; 2) goal difference; 3) number of goals scored.
(C) Champions; (D) Disqualified; (O) Play-off winners; (P) Promoted; (R) Relegated

=== Play-offs ===
Semifinals
2	North Ferriby United	0	0	0
5	Guiseley	2	1	3
3	Altrincham	2	2	4
4	Hednesford Town	2	1	3

Final
5	Guiseley	1
3	Altrincham	2

==== First leg ====
30 April 2014	Guiseley	2–0	North Ferriby United	Nethermoor Park, Guiseley
19:45	Boyes 37'; Johnson 49'	Report		Attendance: 1,164

30 April 2014	Hednesford Town	2–2	Altrincham	Keys Park, Hednesford
19:45	Melbourne 33'; Glover 58'	Report	Reeves 14'; Walshaw 61'	Attendance: 1,209

==== Second leg ====
3 May 2014	North Ferriby United	0–1 (0–3 agg.)	Guiseley	Grange Lane, North Ferriby
15:00		Report	Brooksby 60'	Attendance: 924

3 May 2014	Altrincham	2–1 (4–3 agg.)	Hednesford Town	Moss Lane, Altrincham
15:00	Reeves 85'; Lawrie 87'	Report	Thorley 80'	Attendance: 1,974

==== Final ====
10 May 2014	Altrincham	2–1 (a.e.t.)	Guiseley	Moss Lane, Altrincham
15:00	Lawrie 51'; Wilkinson 119'	Report	Forrest 70'	Attendance: 4,632

=== Stadia and locations ===
Locations of the Conference North 2013–14 teams

Team	Stadium	Capacity
AFC Telford United	New Bucks Head	6,300
Altrincham	Moss Lane	6,085
Barrow	Holker Street	5,000
Boston United	York Street	6,643
Brackley Town	St. James Park	3,500
Bradford Park Avenue	Horsfall Stadium	3,500
Colwyn Bay	Llanelian Road	2,500
Gainsborough Trinity	The Northolme	4,304
Gloucester City	Whaddon Road	7,066
Guiseley	Nethermoor Park	3,000
Harrogate Town	Wetherby Road	3,800
Hednesford Town	Keys Park	6,500
Histon	Bridge Road	4,300
Leamington	New Windmill Ground	2,300
North Ferriby United	Grange Lane	2,700
Oxford City	Court Place Farm	2,000
Solihull Moors	Damson Park	3,050
Stalybridge Celtic	Bower Fold	6,500
Stockport County	Edgeley Park	10,841
Vauxhall Motors	Rivacre Park	3,300
Worcester City	Aggborough	6,302
Workington	Borough Park	3,101

=== Results ===
Home \ Away	TEL	ALT	BRW	BOS	BRK	BPA	COL	GAI	GLO	GUI	HAR	HED	HIS	LEA	NFU	OXC	SOL	STL	STP	VAU	WRC	WRK
AFC Telford United		3–1	0–1	2–1	2–1	2–1	4–1	3–0	2–1	4–2	0–1	5–3	3–2	1–2	2–0	4–0	1–1	3–1	2–0	1–0	0–0	2–1
Altrincham	1–1		2–1	0–0	1–0	4–1	3–1	3–0	2–0	4–1	1–3	1–3	2–2	3–2	1–1	2–2	1–0	5–0	3–0	5–1	1–2	2–0
Barrow	0–3	1–1		4–4	0–1	0–1	1–1	0–6	0–0	1–0	1–0	1–0	2–1	0–0	2–0	1–1	0–2	1–1	2–4	1–1	0–1	2–0
Boston United	1–1	3–2	1–0		1–2	2–3	2–1	6–0	2–0	3–0	3–3	4–0	0–0	2–0	2–0	2–1	4–1	4–1	0–0	5–2	2–1	5–3
Brackley Town	1–1	1–2	1–2	3–2		0–1	2–2	3–1	1–3	1–2	2–2	1–0	3–0	1–1	1–1	2–1	1–0	3–0	0–0	2–1	0–0	1–1
Bradford Park Avenue	3–1	2–4	2–2	1–1	0–5		1–2	4–0	3–1	0–3	0–0	1–2	3–0	3–2	0–4	3–3	2–2	1–1	0–2	0–0	6–1	1–0
Colwyn Bay	0–1	1–3	1–2	3–3	2–2	2–2		0–2	1–1	2–2	2–1	1–3	1–0	1–1	0–3	1–1	3–1	1–2	0–0	1–0	0–0	3–2
Gainsborough Trinity	1–3	5–4	2–1	0–1	2–2	4–2	0–2		3–3	1–2	2–0	1–2	3–1	1–1	1–4	6–0	2–3	0–2	1–5	1–1	2–1	3–0
Gloucester City	1–2	2–0	1–3	1–3	2–2	2–3	2–3	0–1		1–1	5–2	5–1	2–0	3–3	1–1	0–2	0–3	1–0	2–0	2–2	2–1	1–1
Guiseley	6–1	2–2	2–1	1–0	0–2	0–2	2–1	3–1	3–1		2–0	1–2	1–1	2–1	1–0	2–0	0–3	3–1	2–0	1–0	0–1	1–0
Harrogate Town	2–2	3–2	3–1	4–0	0–1	1–1	2–2	1–1	4–2	2–3		3–1	0–1	1–1	5–0	3–2	2–1	2–1	3–1	1–1	2–0	3–0
Hednesford Town	3–3	1–1	3–1	4–2	2–2	2–0	2–1	1–3	4–1	3–2	1–3		2–1	3–2	0–1	3–0	1–2	4–1	3–1	2–0	4–0	4–0
Histon	0–1	0–5	0–0	1–2	3–3	1–0	3–1	2–0	1–3	1–1	0–1	0–1		1–1	0–3	2–2	0–3	1–4	2–1	1–2	1–2	3–1
Leamington	2–2	0–1	1–1	0–0	3–1	2–0	2–1	0–1	0–1	2–3	1–2	2–1	1–0		0–2	4–0	0–1	1–0	2–1	0–1	1–0	2–0
North Ferriby United	2–2	2–1	2–2	3–0	1–1	2–1	2–3	2–0	3–1	2–3	3–2	3–0	4–4	4–1		2–1	1–1	2–0	0–0	2–0	2–1	3–1
Oxford City	2–0	1–2	0–1	1–1	0–0	1–1	1–2	1–0	1–0	3–3	1–2	1–2	2–1	2–2	2–3		0–2	2–1	4–1	3–0	0–0	1–1
Solihull Moors	2–2	0–1	0–2	1–2	1–0	2–2	2–2	3–2	2–1	0–3	3–0	2–3	0–0	0–0	2–0	2–2		3–3	1–0	1–0	1–1	1–1
Stalybridge Celtic	0–2	0–5	1–3	3–3	1–1	2–2	2–3	3–2	2–2	2–3	3–2	0–4	2–1	2–1	2–3	1–1	2–3		0–0	3–2	1–2	2–0
Stockport County	4–2	0–0	2–2	1–4	0–2	4–1	0–1	3–1	2–2	3–3	3–1	0–1	1–0	1–1	1–2	2–0	2–2	2–0		4–1	4–0	1–1
Vauxhall Motors	2–4	1–2	1–1	2–2	0–3	0–2	0–3	2–1	3–2	0–5	1–0	2–2	4–0	2–1	0–1	1–0	0–2	1–3	2–1		1–0	2–1
Worcester City	0–1	1–3	1–0	3–0	1–1	1–2	2–1	2–2	0–1	0–0	1–0	2–2	1–1	0–3	0–1	0–2	3–1	2–1	0–0	2–0		4–0
Workington	0–1	1–6	2–3	1–0	0–3	0–2	0–3	4–2	4–2	1–1	0–3	2–2	2–3	1–2	3–3	1–0	0–0	1–0	1–1	0–1	1–0	

Updated to match(es) played on 21 April 2014. Source: Football Conference
Legend: Blue = home team win; Yellow = draw; Red = away team win.

== Conference South ==
Conference South
- Season: 2013–14
- Champions: Eastleigh
- Promoted: Dover Athletic
- Relegated: Tonbridge Angels; Dorchester Town

=== Promotion and relegation ===
Teams promoted from 2012–13 Isthmian League Premier Division

- Whitehawk
- Concord Rangers

Teams promoted from 2012–13 Southern League Premier Division

- Gosport Borough

Teams relegated from 2012–13 Conference Premier

- Ebbsfleet United

Teams transferred from 2012–13 Conference North

- Bishop's Stortford

=== League table ===
Pos	Team	Pld	W	D	L	GF	GA	GD	Pts	Promotion, qualification or relegation
1	Eastleigh (C, P)	42	26	8	8	71	40	+31	86	Promotion to Conference Premier
2	Sutton United	42	23	12	7	77	39	+38	81	Qualification for the Conference South play-offs
3	Bromley	42	25	5	12	82	50	+32	80	Qualification for the Conference South play-offs
4	Ebbsfleet United	42	21	11	10	67	40	+27	74	Qualification for the Conference South play-offs
5	Dover Athletic (O, P)	42	20	9	13	63	38	+25	69	Qualification for the Conference South play-offs
6	Havant & Waterlooville	42	19	12	11	57	43	+14	69	
7	Bath City	42	18	12	12	64	52	+12	66	
8	Staines Town	42	18	9	15	56	57	−1	63	
9	Concord Rangers	42	17	10	15	58	59	−1	61	
10	Eastbourne Borough	42	16	10	16	55	59	−4	58	
11	Weston-super-Mare	42	16	9	17	50	55	−5	57	
12	Gosport Borough	42	16	7	19	46	51	−5	55	
13	Boreham Wood	42	14	11	17	65	55	+10	53	
14	Basingstoke Town	42	15	8	19	55	56	−1	53	
15	Bishop's Stortford	42	13	13	16	63	68	−5	52	
16	Farnborough	42	15	5	22	62	78	−16	50	
17	Chelmsford City	42	14	7	21	57	77	−20	49	
18	Maidenhead United	42	12	10	20	55	69	−14	46	
19	Whitehawk	42	12	10	20	56	71	−15	46	
20	Hayes & Yeading United	42	13	6	23	45	52	−7	45	Reprived from relegation (Note: Hayes & Yeading United were reprieved from relegation due to the expulsion of Hereford United from the Conference.)
21	Tonbridge Angels (R)	42	9	13	20	43	77	−34	40	Relegation to the Isthmian League Premier Division
22	Dorchester Town (R)	42	8	7	27	33	94	−61	31	Relegation to the Southern League Premier Division

Source: Football Conference
Rules for classification: 1) points; 2) goal difference; 3) number of goals scored.
(C) Champions; (O) Play-off winners; (P) Promoted; (R) Relegated

=== Play-offs ===
Semifinals
2	Sutton United	1	0	1
5	Dover Athletic	1	3	4
3	Bromley	0	1	1
4	Ebbsfleet United	4	0	4

Final
5	Dover Athletic	1
4	Ebbsfleet United	0

==== First leg ====
30 April 2014	Dover Athletic	1–1	Sutton United	Crabble Athletic Ground, River
19:45	Ademola 43'		Dundas 1'	Attendance: 1,273

30 April 2014	Ebbsfleet United	4–0	Bromley	Stonebridge Road, Northfleet
19:45	May 1'; Bricknell 9' (pen.); Howe 64'; McMahon 83'			Attendance: 1,693

==== Second leg ====
3 May 2014	Sutton United	0–3 (1–4 agg.)	Dover Athletic	Gander Green Lane, London (Sutton)
15:00			Modeste 57' 77'; Ademola 79'	Attendance: 1,671

3 May 2014	Bromley	1–0 (1–4 agg.)	Ebbsfleet United	Courage Stadium, London (Bromley)
15:00	Waldren 25'			Attendance: 1,441

==== Final ====
10 May 2014	Ebbsfleet United	0–1	Dover Athletic	Stonebridge Road, Northfleet
15:00		Report	Elder 55'	Attendance: 4,294

=== Stadia and locations ===
Locations of the Conference South 2013–14 teams

Team	Stadium	Capacity
Basingstoke Town	The Camrose	6,000
Bath City	Twerton Park	8,840
Bishop's Stortford	ProKit UK Stadium	4,525
Boreham Wood	Meadow Park	4,502
Bromley	Courage Stadium	6,000
Chelmsford City	Melbourne Stadium	3,019
Concord Rangers	Thames Road	1,500
Dorchester Town	The Avenue Stadium	5,009
Dover Athletic	Crabble Athletic Ground	6,500
Eastbourne Borough	Langney Sports Club	4,134
Eastleigh	Silverlake Stadium	3,500
Ebbsfleet United	Stonebridge Road	4,100
Farnborough	Cherrywood Stadium	4,000
Gosport Borough	Privett Park	4,500
Havant & Waterlooville	West Leigh Park	5,250
Hayes & Yeading United	Kingfield Stadium	6,036
Maidenhead United	York Road	3,000
Staines Town	Wheatsheaf Park	3,009
Sutton United	Gander Green Lane	7,032
Tonbridge Angels	Longmead Stadium	3,000
Weston-super-Mare	Woodspring Stadium	3,500
Whitehawk	The Enclosed Ground	2,000

=== Results ===
Home \ Away	BAS	BAT	BST	BOR	BRO	CHE	CON	DOR	DOV	EAB	EAS	EBB	FAR	GOS	H&W	H&Y	MDH	STA	SUT	TON	WSM	WHI
Basingstoke Town		0–0	0–0	1–0	0–1	2–3	0–1	2–1	2–0	1–2	2–0	2–2	4–0	2–1	0–1	0–1	2–2	2–1	0–1	0–0	3–2	1–3
Bath City	0–1		2–1	2–2	1–2	4–1	3–1	1–0	0–2	2–1	0–1	2–2	4–2	1–1	3–1	3–2	1–0	1–1	2–2	2–2	1–0	3–1
Bishop's Stortford	5–3	1–2		1–3	1–0	1–1	0–1	1–1	2–2	1–0	2–2	3–2	1–3	4–0	2–1	0–0	1–1	1–0	1–2	2–1	0–0	1–2
Boreham Wood	1–1	0–1	2–2		1–1	4–3	0–2	5–0	2–2	3–1	0–3	2–1	1–1	2–0	0–2	1–3	2–2	0–2	1–3	7–0	1–1	1–3
Bromley	3–2	2–2	3–2	2–1		5–0	1–2	4–1	0–4	2–1	1–2	0–0	3–0	2–1	2–0	2–1	6–1	3–0	2–4	5–1	2–1	4–0
Chelmsford City	1–0	1–0	2–1	0–6	3–1		2–2	4–1	0–4	3–0	0–0	1–2	3–1	1–0	0–0	0–0	0–3	3–2	0–2	7–1	1–2	0–2
Concord Rangers	1–2	0–2	0–2	0–4	2–3	1–3		1–0	1–2	1–1	3–2	1–2	5–0	0–2	3–4	3–1	4–1	2–1	0–0	2–2	2–0	1–1
Dorchester Town	0–4	0–2	1–3	1–4	3–2	2–0	2–2		0–4	0–0	1–2	1–3	1–0	1–1	0–2	0–2	0–3	1–1	0–0	2–1	0–3	2–6
Dover Athletic	1–1	2–0	2–3	0–0	0–2	2–2	0–1	1–0		0–0	1–2	2–1	0–1	3–0	0–0	0–1	2–0	1–0	0–1	3–1	1–2	1–1
Eastbourne Borough	1–3	3–2	4–1	1–0	1–1	4–2	0–0	0–1	0–4		1–1	1–1	5–2	1–3	0–1	3–1	2–0	2–0	1–1	2–1	2–0	0–2
Eastleigh	2–1	2–1	4–2	0–1	2–1	1–0	1–1	6–0	1–0	2–0		3–1	1–0	2–1	0–0	1–0	3–2	1–0	1–0	1–2	3–1	3–2
Ebbsfleet United	1–0	1–1	2–1	0–0	1–3	0–2	4–0	4–0	0–2	1–0	3–1		3–0	2–1	0–0	1–0	1–1	3–0	2–0	1–0	1–1	3–1
Farnborough	0–3	2–4	4–2	2–0	2–1	2–0	0–2	3–2	1–0	3–3	0–1	0–1		1–0	2–2	1–2	3–0	1–2	1–2	3–2	4–0	2–0
Gosport Borough	2–0	3–1	2–1	2–1	1–2	2–1	1–2	1–1	0–1	1–2	0–2	0–2	1–0		0–0	3–0	0–2	2–0	2–2	2–0	0–0	0–2
Havant & Waterlooville	4–1	1–0	2–0	1–1	1–0	3–0	1–0	5–1	3–4	1–1	1–0	1–0	2–1	3–0		1–2	1–3	0–2	0–5	1–2	2–0	2–0
Hayes & Yeading United	0–0	0–2	2–3	1–0	0–2	4–0	1–0	2–0	1–2	0–1	1–1	1–2	1–2	0–1	0–1		1–2	1–2	0–0	3–0	1–2	3–2
Maidenhead United	0–1	0–1	2–2	0–1	0–1	1–1	1–3	1–3	1–2	2–3	1–3	1–0	2–2	1–2	1–3	2–1		3–1	3–2	0–0	0–3	1–0
Staines Town	4–5	1–0	2–0	3–1	2–1	3–1	0–1	1–0	2–2	2–1	0–0	1–1	3–2	0–3	1–0	2–1	0–0		2–1	0–0	2–1	2–1
Sutton United	4–0	2–2	1–2	1–0	1–0	2–0	1–0	0–1	1–0	4–0	1–1	3–1	3–3	2–0	3–1	2–0	3–2	4–1		1–2	3–0	2–0
Tonbridge Angels	2–1	1–1	1–1	0–2	1–1	2–1	2–2	1–2	0–2	2–1	2–1	0–2	1–3	0–2	0–0	1–1	2–4	1–1	1–1		1–0	3–1
Weston-super-Mare	1–0	2–0	2–2	3–0	0–1	2–0	5–0	3–0	2–1	0–1	3–2	0–6	2–1	0–1	1–1	0–3	0–0	0–3	1–1	2–1		2–1
Whitehawk	1–0	2–2	1–1	0–2	1–2	0–4	0–2	3–0	0–1	1–2	1–4	1–1	3–1	1–1	2–2	1–0	0–3	3–3	3–3	1–0	0–0	

Updated to match(es) played on 24 April 2014. Source: Football Conference
Legend: Blue = home team win; Yellow = draw; Red = away team win.
