= Ryan Donaldson =

English footballer (born 1991)

Personal information
- Full name: Ryan Mark Donaldson
- Date of birth: 1 May 1991 (age 35)
- Place of birth: Newcastle upon Tyne, England
- Height: 6 ft 1 in (1.85 m)
- Positions: Winger; attacking midfielder

Team information
- Current team: Ashington

Youth career
- 2001–2008: Newcastle United

Senior career*
Years	Team	Apps	(Gls)
2008–2012	Newcastle United	2	(0)
2011	→ Hartlepool United (loan)	12	(0)
2011	→ Tranmere Rovers (loan)	1	(0)
2012–2013	Gateshead	39	(8)
2013–2016	Cambridge United	98	(11)
2016–2017	Plymouth Argyle	26	(2)
2017–2021	Hartlepool United	123	(6)
2021–2024	Morpeth Town	100	(5)
2024	Blyth Spartans	10	(0)
2025–	Ashington	58	(3)

International career^{‡}
2007–2008	England U17	11	(0)
2009–2010	England U19	10	(1)
- * Club domestic league appearances and goals as of 22:08, 31 August 2026 (UTC) ‡ National team caps and goals as of 07:48, 31 May 2010 (UTC)

Ryan Mark Donaldson (born 1 May 1991) is an English professional footballer who plays as a midfielder for Ashington.

== Club career ==
=== Newcastle United ===
Donaldson joined his hometown club at aged 9. He made his way through the academy to the u18s where he reached the semi-final of the FA Youth Cup in 2007 and captained the team to the fifth round in 2009 where they lost out to Manchester City.

After being promoted to the first team for the 2008–09 season, Donaldson made the bench for a handful of games but did not manage to make an appearance. He eventually made his league and home debut for Newcastle on 31 August 2009 in the 1–0 home win against Leicester City and then made his second appearance as a second-half substitute for Ryan Taylor playing the final 15 minutes of the game in a 4–0 victory over Ipswich Town on 26 September 2009. He made his full debut when Chris Hughton handed him and several youngsters a starting role in the 22 September League Cup game away at Peterborough United. He was a regular member of the squad which won the championship that season, collecting a winners medal after the last game of the season at home to Ipswich Town.

His second Newcastle start came in the 2010–2011 season when he played in the second round League Cup tie against Accrington Stanley in central midfield alongside Haris Vučkić.

On 24 January 2011, Donaldson joined Hartlepool United on a month-long loan. He made his debut the following day in a 1–1 draw with Notts County. On 25 February, Hartlepool extended Donaldson's loan for a further month. After his next loan move to Tranmere was cut short by a torn hamstring, he was released by Newcastle United on 1 June 2012.

=== Gateshead ===
On 17 August 2012, Donaldson turned down interest from League 1 and the SPL to sign for local Conference Premier side Gateshead until 1 January 2013. He made his debut the following day as a substitute in a 1–1 draw with Forest Green Rovers. He scored his first senior goal on 24 August 2012 in a 2–1 win over Stockport County, before being sent off late in the game. On 26 November 2012, Donaldson signed an extension to his contract until the end of the 2012–13 season.

=== Cambridge United ===
On 23 May 2013, Donaldson chose to leave Gateshead and signed for Cambridge United on a two-year deal when the 12/13 came to a close, thus reuniting with his former Newcastle academy director Richard Money. Donaldson scored twice in Cambridge's 4–0 FA Trophy victory over Gosport Borough. He then scored the winner in the Conference Promotion Final as Cambridge overcame his old team Gateshead 2–1 at Wembley. He received the man of the match award on both Wembley visits.

Donaldson left Cambridge United at the end of the 2015–16 season.

=== Plymouth Argyle ===
Donaldson became the first summer signing for Plymouth Argyle in June 2016.

Donaldson made 22 appearances before he was sidelined in December 2016 with a broken jaw, suffered during a training ground collision.

=== Hartlepool United ===
Donaldson signed for Hartlepool United on a two-year deal in June 2017.

After his first season, Donaldson was made available for transfer by manager Matthew Bates. However, he was back in favour and made team captain under new manager Craig Hignett and signed a contract extension in May 2019.

Donaldson scored what proved to be the decisive penalty in a 5–4 shoot-out win over Torquay United in the 2021 National League promotion final. This helped Hartlepool to return to the EFL after a four-year absence and secured the club's first promotion in 14 years.

On 13 July 2021, Donaldson left Hartlepool after turning down a deal to stay at the club.

=== Morpeth Town ===
On 16 July 2021, Donaldson signed for Morpeth Town.

=== Blyth Spartans ===
On 18 June 2024, Donaldson joined Northern Premier League Premier Division side Blyth Spartans. He departed the club in December 2024.

=== Ashington ===
In January 2025, Donaldson signed for Ashington. He won the Players’ Player award at the end of the 2025/26 season.

== International career ==
In the summer of 2007, Donaldson was called up to the England U17 squad and made his debut on 31 July at the Nordic Championships, helping them to a third-place finish. He took part in the Algarve Tournament the following summer and England's unsuccessful 2008 UEFA European Under-17 Championship qualifying campaign.

Donaldson was promoted to the U19s and made his debut in September 2009. He started and scored the opening goal in a 3–1 win over Slovenia.

He played regularly during the U19s' run to the European Championship semi-final before they were defeated 3–1 by Spain.

== Career statistics ==
As of 31 August 2026

Appearances and goals by club, season and competition
Club	Season	League			National Cup		League Cup		Other		Total	
Club	Season	Division	Apps	Goals	Apps	Goals	Apps	Goals	Apps	Goals	Apps	Goals
Newcastle United	2009–10	Championship	2	0	2	0	1	0	—		5	0
Newcastle United	2010–11	Premier League	0	0	0	0	1	0	—		1	0
Newcastle United	2011–12	Premier League	0	0	0	0	0	0	—		0	0
Newcastle United	Total		2	0	2	0	2	0	0	0	6	0
Hartlepool United (loan)	2010–11	League One	12	0	0	0	0	0	0	0	12	0
Tranmere Rovers (loan)	2011–12	League One	1	0	0	0	0	0	0	0	1	0
Gateshead	2012–13	Conference Premier	39	8	1	0	—		3 (Note: Appearance(s) in FA Trophy)	0	43	8
Cambridge United	2013–14	Conference Premier	30	4	1	0	—		8 (Note: Five appearances in the FA Trophy, Three appearances in the Conference play-offs)	3 (Note: Two goals in the FA Trophy, One goal in the Conference Play-offs)	39	7
Cambridge United	2014–15	League Two	38	5	4	1	1	1	1 (Note: One appearance in the Football League Trophy)	0	44	7
Cambridge United	2015–16	League Two	30	2	2	0	1	0	0	0	33	2
Cambridge United	Total		98	11	7	1	2	1	9	3	116	16
Plymouth Argyle	2016–17	League Two	26	2	3	0	1	0	2 (Note: Appearances in EFL Trophy)	0	33	2
Hartlepool United	2017–18	National League	20	2	0	0	—		0	0	20	2
Hartlepool United	2018–19	National League	43	1	3	0	—		2	1	48	2
Hartlepool United	2019–20	National League	34	3	5	1	—		1	1	40	5
Hartlepool United	2020–21	National League	25	0	1	0	—		4 (Note: One appearance in the FA Trophy and three appearances in the National League play-offs)	0	30	0
Hartlepool United	Total		123	6	9	1	0	0	7	2	139	8
Morpeth Town	2021–22	NPL Premier Division	36	3	5	2	0	0	5	2	46	7
Morpeth Town	2022–23	NPL Premier Division	35	2	2	0	—		1	0	38	2
Morpeth Town	2023–24	NPL Premier Division	29	0	2	0	—		1	0	32	0
Morpeth Town	Total		100	5	9	2	0	0	7	2	116	9
Blyth Spartans	2024–25	NPL Premier Division	10	0	1	0	—		1	0	12	0
Ashington	2024–25	NPL East Division	16	2	0	0	—		0	0	16	2
Ashington	2025–26	NPL East Division	38	0	1	0	—		2	0	41	0
Ashington	2026–27	NPL East Division	4	1	2	0	—		0	0	6	1
Ashington	Total		58	3	3	0	0	0	2	0	63	3
Career Total			466	35	32	4	5	1	24	6	527	46

== Honours ==
Cambridge United

- Conference Premier play-offs: 2014
- FA Trophy: 2013–14

Plymouth Argyle

- EFL League Two runner-up: 2016–17

Hartlepool United

- National League play-offs: 2021
