= Delano Sam-Yorke =

English footballer

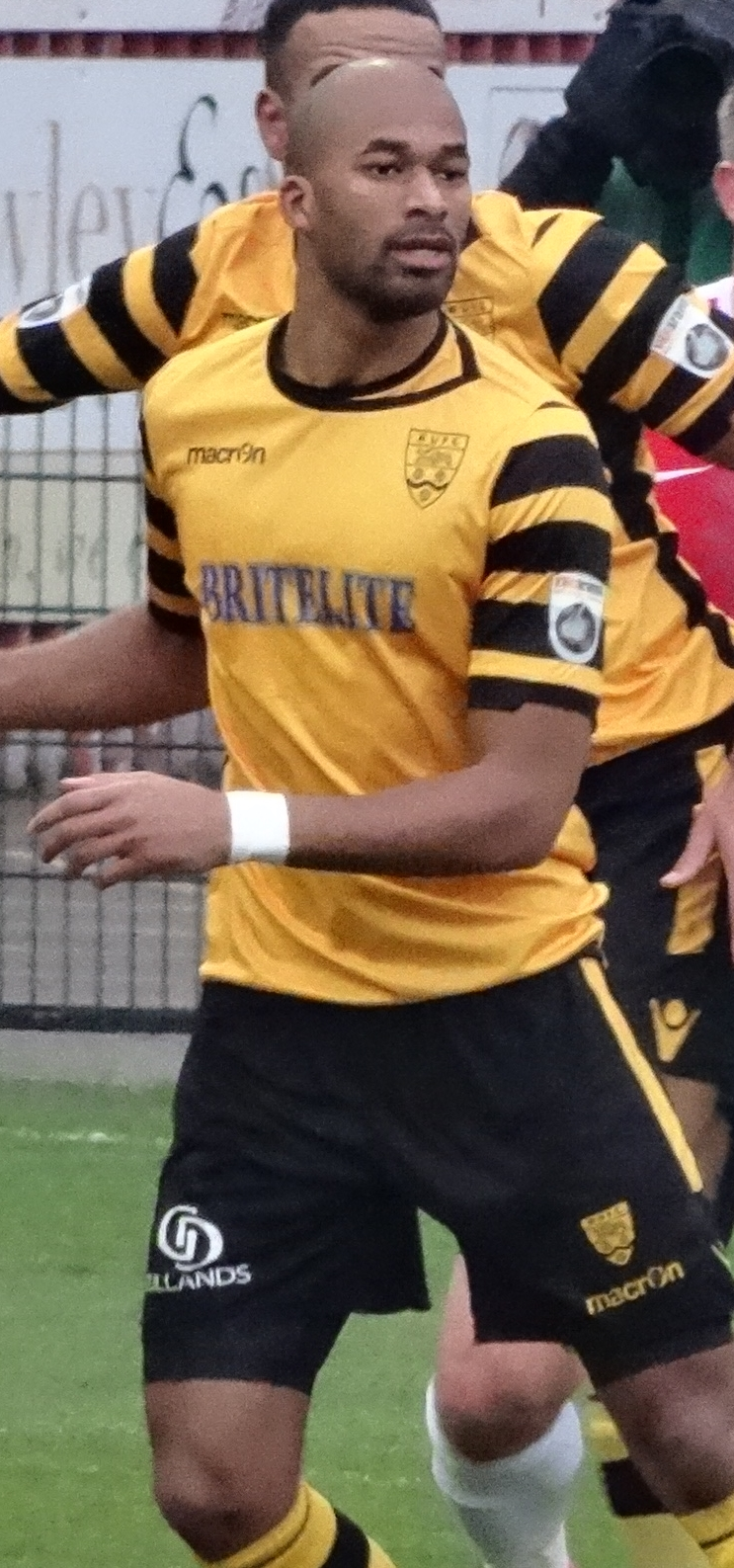
- Sam-Yorke playing for Maidstone United in 2017

Personal information
- Full name: Delano Ezra Sam-Yorke
- Date of birth: 20 January 1989 (age 37)
- Place of birth: Hammersmith, England
- Height: 6 ft 1 in (1.85 m)
- Position: Striker

Youth career
- –2005: Wycombe Wanderers
- 2006–2008: Woking

Senior career*
Years	Team	Apps	(Gls)
2008–2010	Woking	40	(3)
2009	→ Cray Wanderers (loan)	?	(?)
2010–2011	AFC Wimbledon	0	(0)
2010–2011	→ Basingstoke Town (loan)	24	(10)
2011–2013	Basingstoke Town	70	(30)
2013–2015	Cambridge United	29	(5)
2014	→ Lincoln City (loan)	9	(3)
2014–2015	→ Lincoln City (loan)	21	(4)
2015	Lincoln City	12	(1)
2015–2016	Forest Green Rovers	16	(0)
2016	→ Boreham Wood (loan)	16	(1)
2016–2017	Woking	26	(7)
2017	→ Maidstone United (loan)	8	(3)
2017–2018	Maidstone United	32	(1)
2018–2019	Dartford	12	(1)
2018–2019	→ Kingstonian (loan)	8	(2)
2019	→ Kingstonian (loan)	11	(3)
2019–2020	Merstham	7	(3)
2020	East Grinstead Town	0	(0)
2021	Merstham	2	(0)
- * Club domestic league appearances and goals as of 18:26, 22 August 2020 (UTC)

Delano Ezra Sam-Yorke (born 20 January 1989) is an English footballer who last played as a striker for Merstham. He most notably featured for Woking, Basingstoke Town, Cambridge United, Lincoln City and Maidstone United.

== Career ==
=== Woking ===
Sam-Yorke was born in Hammersmith, London. Originally a winger, he began his career with Wycombe Wanderers, before joining Woking and progressing through the club's academy to make his first-team debut as a substitute on 9 August 2008 in a Conference Premier defeat against Altrincham. His first full appearance came on 25 August 2008 in a 0–0 away draw against Oxford United at the Kassam Stadium. In his first full season as part of the first team, he couldn't prevent Woking from being relegated into the Conference South at the end of the 2008–09 season.

On 19 November 2009, Sam-Yorke joined Isthmian League Premier Division side Cray Wanderers on a one-month loan deal to gain first-team experience. On 29 November 2009, Sam-Yorke scored his first Cray Wanderers goal, providing the winner in a 3–2 victory over Margate.

The following 2009–10 season saw him help Woking to the first round of the FA Cup, playing the full 90 minutes in a 1–0 away loss against League One side Swindon Town.

=== AFC Wimbledon ===
Sam-Yorke joined AFC Wimbledon in the summer of 2010 but struggled to break into the first team squad. He subsequently joined Conference South side Basingstoke Town in a loan deal in September 2010. AFC Wimbledon earned promotion into the Football League via the Conference Premier play-offs at the end of the 2010–11 season, however Sam-Yorke left the club at the end of the campaign.

=== Basingstoke Town ===
On his release by AFC Wimbledon, he returned to Basingstoke Town on a permanent deal in June 2011. In November 2011, he helped Basingstoke to the first round of the FA Cup, starting in a 1–0 loss against Brentford.

At the end of his first full season at Basingstoke, he was a part of the club's team that reached the Conference South play-offs, however they lost in the semi-finals against Dartford in May 2012. He ended the following 2012–13 season as Basingstoke's top goal scorer however left the club in May 2013.

=== Cambridge United ===
He signed for Cambridge United in May 2013, returning to the Conference Premier. He made a successful start to life at the Abbey Stadium, scoring twice on his debut on the opening day of the 2013–14 season in a 5–1 win against FC Halifax Town.

With the majority of his appearances for Cambridge United coming as a substitute, he moved on loan to Conference Premier rivals Lincoln City on 2 January 2014. He scored his first goal for Lincoln in only his second appearance on 7 January 2014 in a 4–1 home win over Alfreton Town.

He returned to Cambridge United, scoring in his first game back at the club in a comprehensive 5–1 victory over Kidderminster Harriers on 1 March 2014. He is considered a cult hero at Cambridge after helping the club to the Conference Premier play-offs by scoring twice in a 2–0 second leg win over FC Halifax Town that secured a 2–1 aggregate win and a place in the final at Wembley Stadium. He started in Cambridge United's play-off final 2–1 win over Gateshead in front of 19,613 supporters at Wembley which earned the club a place back in the Football League.

He remained with Cambridge United following promotion for the start of the 2014–15 season, and made his Football League debut on 9 August 2014 as a substitute in a 1–0 home win over Plymouth Argyle. Three days later he appeared in a League Cup defeat against Birmingham City on 12 August 2014 as a substitute, replacing fellow striker Adam Cunnington at half time in a match that went to extra time.

In September 2014, he returned to the Conference Premier, rejoining Lincoln City for a second loan spell despite reported interest from Grimsby Town. He made his second debut for Lincoln in a 3–1 away loss against his former club, Woking, on 6 September 2014.

=== Lincoln City ===
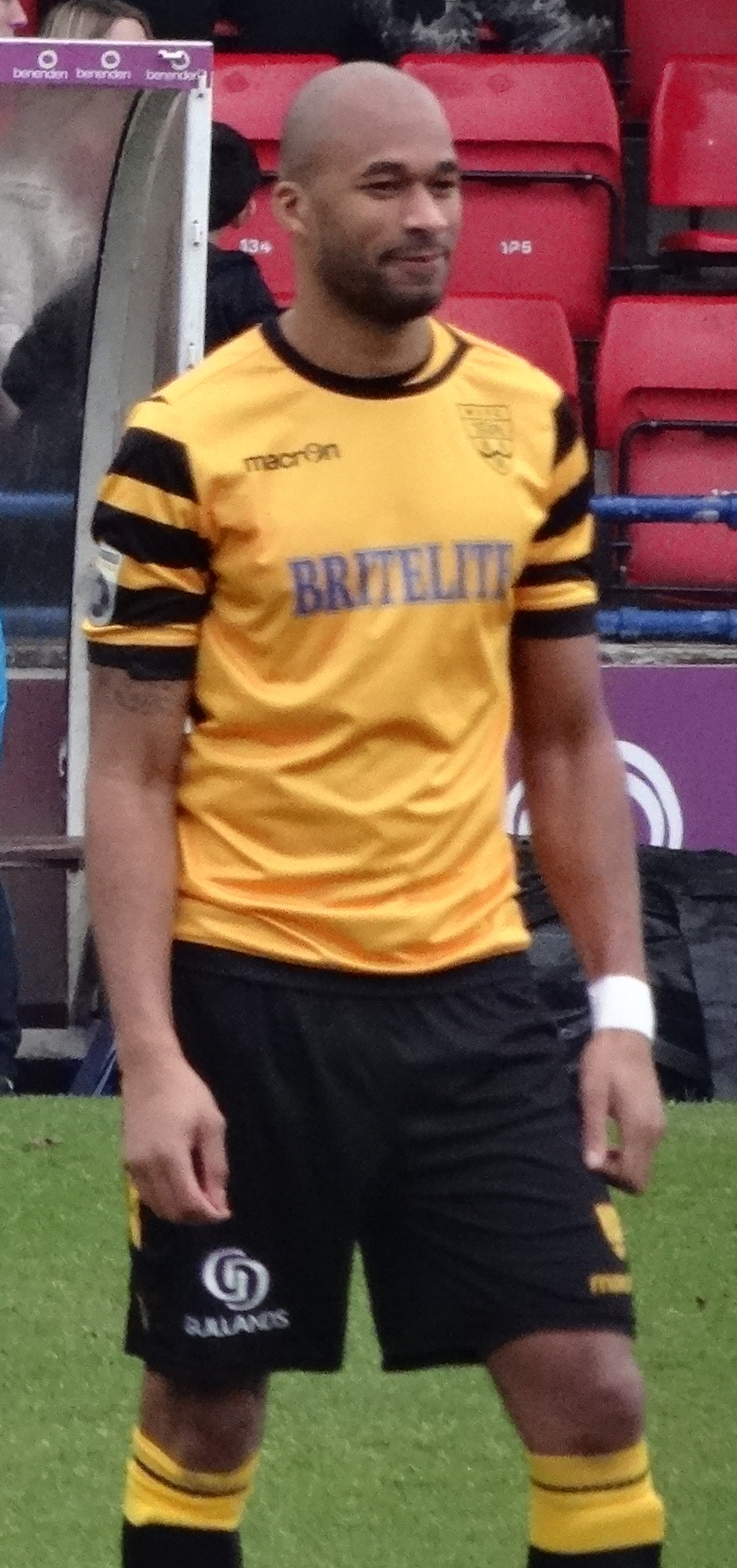
Sam-Yorke playing for Maidstone United in 2017

In January 2015, Sam-Yorke made his loan spell a permanent one with a full-time move to Lincoln City on a free transfer. He went on to score a goal in a 2–1 away win over Dover Athletic on 7 March 2015. Meanwhile, he was also sent off in stoppage time in a 2–0 home loss against Welling United on 14 March 2015. At the end of the 2014–15 season he was one of a number of players released by the club.

=== Forest Green Rovers ===
On 15 May 2015, he joined Forest Green Rovers, moving to The New Lawn on a one-year contract. He made his debut for the club on 8 August 2016 as a second-half substitute in a 1–0 away win over Altrincham. On 18 January 2016, he joined fellow National League club Boreham Wood on loan until the end of the 2015–16 season. He returned to Forest Green at the end of the season for the club's play-off campaign, which ended in defeat in the play-off final at Wembley Stadium, but was unused and was released on 16 May 2016.

=== Return to Woking ===
On 15 July 2016, Sam-Yorke rejoined his first club Woking on a one-year deal after a successful trial. On 10 September 2016, Sam-Yorke made his Woking return in a 1–1 draw against Guiseley, featuring for 65 minutes before being replaced by Chike Kandi. Three days later, Sam-Yorke went on to score a brace in a 3–1 victory over Torquay United, netting both goals in the space of ten minutes.

On 5 January 2017, Sam-Yorke joined fellow National League club Maidstone United on a two-month loan deal. Two days later, Sam-Yorke made his Maidstone debut in a 2–1 defeat against Guiseley, featuring for the entire 90 minutes. In the following fixture, Sam-Yorke scored his first goal for Maidstone United, in their 2–1 victory over Torquay United. After numerous bids for Sam-Yorke's spell at Maidstone to be extended were rejected, he returned to Woking in March 2017, after scoring three times in eight games.

On 21 March 2017, Sam-Yorke scored twice in Woking's 3–1 away victory against Braintree Town, netting both goals in the space of two minutes to give the Cards a 2–1 lead, before Keiran Murtagh finished the scoring in the second half. In the following fixture, Sam-Yorke scored once again, this time against his former club; Maidstone United, netting the Cards' opener in their 4–2 home defeat. The following week, Sam-Yorke continued his impressive scoring record, netting the opener in Woking's 2–1 victory over Sutton United.

=== Maidstone United ===
On 9 May 2017, after an impressive loan spell, Sam-Yorke rejoined Maidstone United on a permanent deal. On the opening day of the 2017–18 campaign, Sam-Yorke marked his return during Maidstone's 1–1 draw with Maidenhead United, playing the full 90 minutes. Following his return to the Kent-based side, Sam-Yorke struggled to replicate his form in his previous spell at the club, registering his first goal in September 2017, against former side Woking. Doubling Maidstone's lead in the 67th minute during the 3–1 victory. Two months later, he scored twice during Maidstone's iconic FA Cup first round 4–2 victory over League Two side Cheltenham Town.

On 2 May 2018, it was announced that Sam-Yorke would leave Maidstone at the conclusion of his contract in June.

=== Dartford ===
On 16 June 2018, Sam-Yorke signed for Dartford. On 14 November 2018, Sam-Yorke joined Kingstonian on an initial month's loan. On 15 February 2019, Sam-Yorke re-joined Kingstonian on loan until the end of the season.

On 17 July 2019, Sam-Yorke announced his retirement from football at the age of 30.

=== Merstham ===
Less than a month after retiring, Sam-Yorke signed for Merstham.

=== East Grinstead Town ===
After a troubled 2019–20 campaign, Sam-Yorke joined East Grinstead Town in July 2020.

=== Return to Merstham ===
On 20 August 2021, Sam-Yorke made his return to Merstham following a short-term spell with East Grinstead Town.

== Career statistics ==
As of match played 2 October 2021.

Appearances and goals by club, season and competition
Club	Season	League			FA Cup		League Cup		Other		Total	
Club	Season	Division	Apps	Goals	Apps	Goals	Apps	Goals	Apps	Goals	Apps	Goals
Woking	2007–08	Conference Premier	1	0	0	0	—		0	0	1	0
Woking	2008–09	Conference Premier	17	0	0	0	—		0	0	17	0
Woking	2009–10	Conference South	22	3	4	0	—		1 (Note: Appearance(s) in FA Trophy)	0	27	3
Woking	Total		40	3	4	0	—		1	0	45	3
Cray Wanderers (loan)	2009–10	Isthmian League Premier Division	?	?	—		—		—		?	?
AFC Wimbledon	2010–11	Conference Premier	0	0	0	0	—		0	0	0	0
Basingstoke Town (loan)	2010–11	Conference South	24	10	0	0	—		0	0	24	10
Basingstoke Town	2011–12	Conference South	33	14	3	1	—		3 (Note: One appearance in FA Trophy, two in Conference South play-offs)	0	39	15
Basingstoke Town	2012–13	Conference South	37	16	2	0	—		1	0	40	16
Basingstoke Town	Total		70	30	5	1	—		4	0	79	31
Cambridge United	2013–14	Conference Premier	27	5	2	0	—		4 (Note: Two appearances in FA Trophy, two appearances and two goals in Conference Premier play-offs)	2	33	7
Cambridge United	2014–15	League Two	2	0	0	0	1	0	0	0	3	0
Cambridge United	Total		29	5	2	0	1	0	4	2	36	7
Lincoln City (loan)	2013–14	Conference Premier	9	3	—		—		—		9	3
Lincoln City (loan)	2014–15	Conference Premier	21	4	2	3	—		0	0	23	7
Lincoln City (loan)	Total		30	7	2	3	—		0	0	32	10
Lincoln City	2014–15	Conference Premier	12	1	0	0	—		0	0	12	1
Forest Green Rovers	2015–16	National League	16	0	0	0	—		1	0	17	0
Boreham Wood (loan)	2015–16	National League	16	1	0	0	—		—		16	1
Woking	2016–17	National League	26	7	4	0	—		2	0	32	7
Maidstone United (loan)	2016–17	National League	8	3	—		—		—		8	3
Maidstone United	2017–18	National League	32	1	4	2	—		4	0	40	3
Dartford	2018–19	National League South	12	1	2	0	—		0	0	14	1
Kingstonian (loan)	2018–19	Isthmian League Premier Division	19	5	—		—		1 (Note: Appearance(s) in Surrey Senior Cup)	1	20	6
Merstham	2019–20	Isthmian League Premier Division	7	3	1	0	—		0	0	8	3
East Grinstead Town	2020–21	Isthmian League South East Division	0	0	0	0	—		0	0	0	0
Merstham	2021–22	Isthmian League Premier Division	2	0	1	0	—		0	0	3	0
Career total			343	77	25	6	1	0	17	3	386	86

== Honours ==
Cambridge United

- FA Trophy winners: 2013–14
- Conference Premier runners-up: 2013–14
- Conference Premier play-offs: 2013–14
