= 2017–18 Wycombe Wanderers F.C. season =

Wycombe Wanderers
2017–18 season
- Chairman: Trevor Stroud
- Manager: Gareth Ainsworth
- Stadium: Adams Park
- League Two: 3rd (Promoted)
- FA Cup: Third round (vs. Preston North End)
- EFL Cup: First round (vs. Fulham)
- EFL Trophy: Group stage
- Top goalscorer: League: Adebayo Akinfenwa (17); All: Adebayo Akinfenwa (18)
- Highest home attendance: 8,802 (vs. Stevenage, 5 May 2018)
- Lowest home attendance: 699 (vs. West Ham United U23s, 28 November 2017)
Home colours	Away colours	Third colours

The 2017–18 season was Wycombe Wanderers' 131st season in existence and their 25th consecutive season in the Football League.

== Competitions ==
=== Pre-season ===
Wycombe Wanderers announced on 18 April 2017 that they will face AFC Wimbledon during their pre-season run-in. On 26 April 2017, A friendly against Maidenhead United was confirmed. Two days later, the club announced they will play Aldershot Town during pre-season. The Chairboys will kick off pre-season against Slough Town. On 22 June 2017, it was announced that Wycombe Wanderers would play a friendly behind closed doors against Queens Park Rangers Under-23s.

8 July 2017	Slough Town	0–0	Wycombe Wanderers	Slough
13:30 BST		Report		Stadium: Arbour Park; Attendance: 1,047

15 July 2017	Wycombe Wanderers	2–1	Queens Park Rangers U23s	Harlington
12:30 BST	Southwell 44' (pen.); Cowan-Hall 60'	Report	El Khayati 55'	Stadium: Queens Park Rangers training ground Attendance: not open to public

22 July 2017	Aldershot Town	2–2	Wycombe Wanderers	Aldershot
15:00 BST	Gallagher 10'; Cook 76'	Report	Southwell 52' (pen.); Freeman 68'	Stadium: Recreation Ground; Attendance: 698

25 July 2017	Wycombe Wanderers	2–0	AFC Wimbledon	High Wycombe
19:45 BST	O'Nien 22'; Akinfenwa 33'	Report		Stadium: Adams Park; Attendance: 1,239

28 July 2017	Maidenhead United	1–0	Wycombe Wanderers	Maidenhead
19:45 BST	Akinfenwa 79' (o.g.)	Report		Stadium: York Road

=== League Two ===
==== League table ====
Pos	Team	Pld	W	D	L	GF	GA	GD	Pts	Promotion, qualification or relegation
1	Accrington Stanley (C, P)	46	29	6	11	76	46	+30	93	Promotion to EFL League One
2	Luton Town (P)	46	25	13	8	94	46	+48	88	Promotion to EFL League One
3	Wycombe Wanderers (P)	46	24	12	10	79	60	+19	84	Promotion to EFL League One
4	Exeter City	46	24	8	14	64	54	+10	80	Qualification for League Two play-offs (Note: Four teams play for one spot and promotion to EFL League One.)
5	Notts County	46	21	14	11	71	48	+23	77	Qualification for League Two play-offs

Source: BBC Sport
Rules for classification: 1) Points; 2) Goal difference; 3) Number of goals scored
(C) Champions; (P) Promoted

==== Results summary ====
Overall								Home						Away					
Pld	W	D	L	GF	GA	GD	Pts	W	D	L	GF	GA	GD	W	D	L	GF	GA	GD
46	24	12	10	79	60	+19	84	12	5	6	43	35	+8	12	7	4	36	25	+11

Last updated: 5 May 2018.

==== Results by matchday ====
Matchday	1	2	3	4	5	6	7	8	9	10	11	12	13	14	15	16	17	18	19	20	21	22	23	24	25	26	27	28	29	30	31	32	33	34	35	36	37	38	39	40	41	42	43	44	45	46
Ground	H	A	H	A	H	A	A	H	A	H	H	A	H	A	A	H	A	H	A	H	A	H	A	H	H	A	H	A	A	H	A	H	A	H	H	H	A	A	H	A	H	A	A	H	A	H
Result	D	W	L	W	W	D	D	L	W	W	W	W	D	D	L	D	L	W	L	W	D	W	L	W	L	W	W	W	W	W	D	W	W	L	L	D	W	W	D	D	W	W	D	L	W	W
Position	16	3	14	8	4	6	8	12	10	8	7	4	5	4	5	7	7	6	8	5	5	4	5	4	6	4	4	4	2	2	3	3	2	3	3	4	4	3	3	3	3	3	3	3	3	3

Updated to match(es) played on 5 May 2018. Source: Statto.com
A = Away; H = Home; W = Win; D = Draw; L = Loss

==== Matches ====
The 2017–18 EFL League Two fixtures were released on 21 June 2017.

5 August 2017 1	Wycombe Wanderers	2–2	Lincoln City	High Wycombe
15:00 BST	O'Nien 37'; Jacobson 40'; Gape (yellow card) 56'; Saunders (yellow card) 66'	Report	Green 31'; Rhead (yellow card) 38'; Ginnelly 48'; Raggett (yellow card) 64'; Woodyard (yellow card) 66'	Stadium: Adams Park; Attendance: 5,538; Referee: Graham Horwood

12 August 2017 2	Port Vale	2–3	Wycombe Wanderers	Burslem, Stoke-on-Trent
15:00 BST	Kay (yellow card) 77'; Turner 88'; Whitfield 90'	Report	Akinfenwa 2', 25'; Cowan-Hall 12'; Brown (yellow card) 50'	Stadium: Vale Park; Attendance: 4,909; Referee: Craig Hicks

19 August 2017 3	Wycombe Wanderers	2–4	Notts County	High Wycombe
15:00 BST	Gape (yellow card) 48'; Freeman 49'; Jacobson 68'; El-Abd (yellow card) 90+2'	Report	Duffy 14'; El-Abd 15' (o.g.); Jones (yellow card) 27'; Forte 84'; Alessandra 89'; Ameobi (yellow card) 90'	Stadium: Adams Park; Attendance: 3,785; Referee: Graham Salisbury

26 August 2017 4	Grimsby Town	2–3	Wycombe Wanderers	Cleethorpes
15:00 BST	Rose (yellow card) 42' (goal) 52' (pen.); Collins (yellow card) 43' (yellow-red card) 58'; Hooper 65'	Report	Akinfenwa 28', 75'; Jacobson 43' (pen.); Bean (yellow card) 81'; El-Abd (yellow card) 90'	Stadium: Blundell Park; Attendance: 4,016; Referee: Mark Heywood

2 September 2017 5	Wycombe Wanderers	3–1	Forest Green Rovers	High Wycombe
15:00 BST	El-Abd (yellow card) 2'; Cowan-Hall 7'; Stewart 22'; O'Nien 36' (yellow card) 82'	Report	Doidge 68'; Russell (yellow card) 70'	Stadium: Adams Park; Attendance: 3,759; Referee: Scott Oldham

9 September 2017 6	Newport County	0–0	Wycombe Wanderers	Newport
15:00 BST		Report	Gape (yellow card) 24'	Stadium: Rodney Parade; Attendance: 3,752; Referee: Ben Toner

12 September 2017 7	Mansfield Town	0–0	Wycombe Wanderers	Mansfield
19:45 BST	Butcher (yellow card) 51'	Report	Bean (yellow card) 44'; O'Nien (yellow card) 58'; Jacobson (yellow card) 63'	Stadium: One Call Stadium; Attendance: 2,938; Referee: Robert Lewis

16 September 2017 8	Wycombe Wanderers	1–2	Luton Town	High Wycombe
15:00 BST	Akinfenwa 40' (yellow card) 90+10'; Bean (yellow card) 80'	Report	Shinnie (yellow card) 31'; Collins (yellow card) 44' (goal) 90+8'; Cuthbert 90'; Hylton (yellow card) 90+9'	Stadium: Adams Park; Attendance: 5,512; Referee: James Linington

23 September 2017 9	Colchester United	1–2	Wycombe Wanderers	Colchester
15:00 BST	Hanlan 43'; Lapslie (yellow card) 64'; Szmodics (yellow card) 71'	Report	Tyson 32'; Bean (yellow card) 61'; Mackail-Smith 67'; O'Nien (yellow card) 77'	Stadium: Colchester Community Stadium; Attendance: 3,562; Referee: Brett Huxtable

26 September 2017 10	Wycombe Wanderers	3–2	Crewe Alexandra	High Wycombe
19:45 BST	Mackail-Smith 29' (yellow card) 65'; Harriman 88'; Tyson 90'; Jacobson (yellow card) 90+2'	Report	Dagnall 42', 66'; Bakayogo (yellow card) 45+1'; Ng (yellow card) 55'; Raynes (yellow card) 89'	Stadium: Adams Park; Attendance: 3,295; Referee: Andy Haines

30 September 2017 11	Wycombe Wanderers	3–1	Barnet	High Wycombe
15:00 BST	Akinfenwa 23'; Umerah 65'; Freeman 76'	Report	Vilhete 78'; Campbell-Ryce (yellow card) 82'	Stadium: Adams Park; Attendance: 4,056; Referee: Ross Joyce

7 October 2017 12	Cambridge United	1–3	Wycombe Wanderers	Cambridge
15:00 BST	Ikpeazu (yellow card) 45+1'; Maris (yellow card) 45+5'; Legge (yellow card) 63' (yellow-red card) 82'; Elito 70' (pen.)	Report	Stewart (yellow card) 45+3'; Eze 48', 57'; Saunders (yellow card) 72'; Umerah 89'	Stadium: Cambs Glass Stadium; Attendance: 5,365; Referee: Gavin Ward

14 October 2017 13	Wycombe Wanderers	0–0	Exeter City	High Wycombe
15:00 BST	Bean (yellow card) 34'	Report		Stadium: Adams Park; Attendance: 5,006; Referee: Robert Jones

17 October 2017 14	Carlisle United	3–3	Wycombe Wanderers	Carlisle
19:45 BST	Lambe 4', 84'; Devitt 38' (pen.)	Report	Saunders (yellow card) 37' (goal) 45+2'; Akinfenwa 72'; Cowan-Hall 90+4'	Stadium: Brunton Park; Attendance: 3,562; Referee: Scott Duncan

21 October 2017 15	Swindon Town	1–0	Wycombe Wanderers	Swindon
15:00 BST	Smith 15' (yellow card) 77'	Report	Cowan-Hall (yellow card) 58'; Jacobson (yellow card) 87'; Bean (yellow card) 90+5'	Stadium: County Ground; Attendance: 7,114; Referee: John Brooks

28 October 2017 16	Wycombe Wanderers	3–3	Cheltenham Town	High Wycombe
15:00 BST	Eze 48'; Akinfenwa 50', 62'; Jacobson (yellow card) 90+2'	Report	Graham 22', 89' (yellow card) 90+4'; Dawson (yellow card) 45+3'; Winchester 70'; Moore (yellow card) 90+1'	Stadium: Adams Park; Referee: Lee Collins

11 November 2017 17	Morecambe	2–1	Wycombe Wanderers	Morecambe
15:00 GMT	Old 27'; McGurk 43'	Report	Saunders (yellow card) 26'; Akinfenwa 82'; Stewart (yellow card) 90'	Stadium: Globe Arena; Referee: Andy Haines

18 November 2017 18	Wycombe Wanderers	4–0	Crawley Town	High Wycombe
15:00 GMT	Mackail-Smith (yellow card) 30' (goal) 72', 81', 83'; Eze 50'; Bloomfield (yellow card) 76'; Brown (yellow card) 86'	Report	Evina (yellow card) 33'; Connolly (yellow card) 73'	Stadium: Adams Park; Attendance: 4,494; Referee: Antony Coggins

21 November 2017 19	Accrington Stanley	1–0	Wycombe Wanderers	Accrington
19:45 GMT	Hughes 70'; Brown (yellow card) 86'	Report	El-Abd (yellow card) 33'; Bean (yellow card) 54'	Stadium: Wham Stadium; Referee: Ross Joyce

25 November 2017 20	Wycombe Wanderers	2–1	Yeovil Town	High Wycombe
15:00 GMT	Eze 37'; Jacobson 43' (pen.)	Report	Zoko 44'; Olomola (yellow card) 45+4'; James (yellow card) 48'; Sowunmi (yellow card) 65'	Stadium: Adams Park; Attendance: 3,834; Referee: Tom Nield

9 December 2017 21	Stevenage	0–0	Wycombe Wanderers	Stevenage
15:00 GMT	Pett (yellow card) 44'; Whelpdale (yellow card) 82'	Report	Jacobson (yellow card) 50'	Stadium: Lamex Stadium; Referee: Scott Duncan

16 December 2017 22	Wycombe Wanderers	1–0	Chesterfield	High Wycombe
15:00 GMT	Akinfenwa (yellow card) 3'; O'Nien 54'; Southwell (yellow card) 90+3'; Brown (yellow card) 90+7'	Report	McCourt (yellow card) 46'; Dennis (yellow card) 79'	Stadium: Adams Park; Attendance: 4,522; Referee: Nick Kinseley

22 December 2017 23	Coventry City	3–2	Wycombe Wanderers	Rowleys Green, Coventry
19:45 GMT	Doyle 14'; Bayliss (yellow card) 34'; McNulty 41', 55' (pen.) (yellow card) 86'; Shipley (yellow card) 83'	Report	Tyson (yellow card) 12'; Scarr 45+5' (yellow card) 54'; Akinfenwa (yellow card) 46'; Jacobson 49' (pen.) (yellow card) 90+2'; O'Nien (yellow card) 52'	Stadium: Ricoh Arena; Attendance: 7,234; Referee: Tony Harrington

26 December 2017 24	Wycombe Wanderers	2–0	Newport County	High Wycombe
15:00 GMT	Tyson 15'; Jacobson (yellow card) 69'; Akinfenwa 78'	Report	Demetriou (yellow card) 15'; McCoulsky (yellow card) 42'; Labadie (yellow card) 49' (yellow-red card) 90'; Nouble (yellow card) 88'	Stadium: Adams Park; Attendance: 4,629; Referee: Charles Breakspear

30 December 2017 25	Wycombe Wanderers	1–2	Mansfield Town	High Wycombe
15:00 GMT	Akinfenwa 7'; Jombati (yellow card) 67'	Report	Angol (yellow card) 39' (goal) 81'; Potter 52'; Benning (yellow card) 64'; Bennett (yellow card) 72'; MacDonald (yellow card) 74'; Sterling-James (yellow card) 89'	Stadium: Adams Park; Attendance: 4,227; Referee: Graham Horwood

1 January 2018 26	Forest Green Rovers	1–2	Wycombe Wanderers	Nailsworth
15:00 GMT	Osbourne (yellow card) 35'; Cooper (red card) 39'; Fitzwater 70'	Report	Bloomfield 26'; Saunders (yellow card) 40'; Mackail-Smith 42' de Havilland (yellow card) 67'; O'Nien (yellow card) 90+8'	Stadium: The New Lawn; Attendance: 2,727; Referee: Antony Coggins

6 January 2018	Luton Town	Postponed	Wycombe Wanderers	Luton
15:00 GMT				Stadium: Kenilworth Road

13 January 2018 27	Wycombe Wanderers	3–1	Colchester United	High Wycombe
15:00 GMT	Akinfenwa 14'; Cowan-Hall 24'; O'Nien (yellow card) 49' (goal) 74'; Scarr (yellow card) 87'	Report	Wright (yellow card) 57'; Szmodics 78'	Stadium: Adams Park; Attendance: 4,386; Referee: John Busby

20 January 2018 28	Crewe Alexandra	2–3	Wycombe Wanderers	Crewe
15:00 GMT	Porter 6' (pen.); Nolan (yellow card) 55'; McKirdy 88' (yellow card) 90'	Report	Cowan-Hall 61'; Tyson 84'; Mackail-Smith 90+2'	Stadium: Alexandra Stadium; Attendance: 3,645; Referee: Martin Coy

27 January 2018	Wycombe Wanderers	Postponed	Coventry City	High Wycombe
15:00 GMT				Stadium: Adams Park

30 January 2018 29	Luton Town	2–3	Wycombe Wanderers	Luton
19:45 GMT	Lee 43', 78'; Potts (yellow card) 90+5'	Report	Cowan-Hall 2' (yellow card) 71'; Tyson 39', 70' (yellow card) 75'; Mackail-Smith (yellow card) 79'; Brown (yellow card) 85'	Stadium: Kenilworth Road; Attendance: 8,564; Referee: Tim Robinson

3 February 2018 30	Wycombe Wanderers	4–3	Carlisle United	High Wycombe
15:00 GMT	Bloomfield 28'; O'Nien 31' (red card) 48'; Cowan-Hall 90+3'; Bean 90+6'	Report	Parkes (yellow card) 22'; Grainger 49' (pen.); Bonham (yellow card) 61'; Devitt 68'; Stockton 70'; Twardek (yellow card) 72'	Stadium: Adams Park; Attendance: 4,145; Referee: Carl Boyeson

10 February 2018 31	Exeter City	1–1	Wycombe Wanderers	Exeter
15:00 GMT	James 12' (yellow card) 90+3'; Sweeney (yellow card) 61'; Holmes (yellow card) 64'	Report	Bean 53'	Stadium: St James Park; Attendance: 3,956; Referee: Steve Martin

13 February 2018 32	Wycombe Wanderers	3–2	Swindon Town	High Wycombe
19:45 GMT	O'Nien 3'; Mackail-Smith 10'; Akinfenwa 89'	Report	Richards 2'; Taylor 61'; Norris (yellow card) 73'; Elšnik (yellow card) 78'	Stadium: Adams Park; Attendance: 4,863; Referee: Andrew Madley

17 February 2018 33	Cheltenham Town	0–2	Wycombe Wanderers	Cheltenham
15:00 GMT	Pell (yellow card) 43'	Report	Akinfenwa 40'; Cowan-Hall 45+1' (yellow card) 48'	Stadium: LCI Rail Stadium; Attendance: 3,513; Referee: Gavin Ward

24 February 2018 34	Wycombe Wanderers	2–4	Morecambe	High Wycombe
15:00 GMT	Freeman 65'; O'Nien 84'	Report	McGurk 3'; Ellison 26', 38' (yellow card) 27'; Wylde 52'	Stadium: Adams Park; Attendance: 4,672; Referee: Craig Hicks

27 February 2018 35	Wycombe Wanderers	0–1	Coventry City	High Wycombe
19:45 GMT	Cowan-Hall (yellow card) 50'; Bloomfield (yellow card) 90'	Report	Reid (yellow card) 80'; McNulty 82' (pen.) (yellow card) 83'	Stadium: Adams Park; Referee: Brendan Malone

3 March 2018	Crawley Town	Postponed	Wycombe Wanderers	Crawley
15:00 GMT				Stadium: Checkatrade.com Stadium

10 March 2018 36	Wycombe Wanderers	1–1	Cambridge United	High Wycombe
15:00 GMT	Akinfenwa 45+4'	Report	Ibehre (yellow card) 45+3'; Waters (yellow card) 68'; Lewis 90+3'	Stadium: Adams Park; Attendance: 4,426; Referee: Nick Kinseley

17 March 2018 37	Barnet	0–2	Wycombe Wanderers	Canons Park, London
15:00 GMT	Weston (yellow card) 46'; Taylor (yellow card) 90'	Report	Jacobson 52' (pen.); Almeida Santos 72' (o.g.)	Stadium: The Hive Stadium; Attendance: 2,103; Referee: Lee Collins

21 March 2018 38	Crawley Town	2–3	Wycombe Wanderers	Crawley
19:45 GMT	Ahearne-Grant 33'; Payne (yellow card) 45+5'; Smith (yellow card) 56'; Camará 83'; Connolly (yellow card) 88' (yellow-red card) 90+1'	Report	Tyson 25'; Moore (yellow card) 31'; Akinfenwa 39'; Jombati 62'; Jacobson (yellow card) 87'	Stadium: Checkatrade.com Stadium; Attendance: 2,133; Referee: Graham Horwood

24 March 2018 39	Wycombe Wanderers	0–0	Port Vale	High Wycombe
15:00 GMT	Freeman (yellow card) 49'; Akinfenwa (yellow card) 59'; Bean (yellow card) 81'	Report	Worrall (yellow card) 56'; Howkins (yellow card) 82'	Stadium: Adams Park; Attendance: 4,620; Referee: Lee Swabey

30 March 2018 40	Notts County	0–0	Wycombe Wanderers	Nottingham
15:00 BST	Hawkridge (yellow card) 55'; Tootle (yellow card) 58'; Brisley (yellow card) 77'; Noble (yellow card) 86'; Ameobi (yellow card) 90+2'	Report	Jacobson (yellow card) 27'; Tyson (yellow card) 33'; Brown (yellow card) 50'; El-Abd (yellow card) 90+3'	Stadium: Meadow Lane; Attendance: 8,038; Referee: Ben Toner

2 April 2018 41	Wycombe Wanderers	2–1	Grimsby Town	High Wycombe
15:00 BST	Jombati (yellow card) 43'; O'Nien (yellow card) 53'; El-Abd 60'; Kashket 67'	Report	Woolford 15'; Fox (yellow card) 53'; Berrett (yellow card) 60'	Stadium: Adams Park; Attendance: 5,215; Referee: Chris Sarginson

7 April 2018	Lincoln City	Postponed	Wycombe Wanderers	Lincoln
15:00 BST				Stadium: Sincil Bank

14 April 2018 42	Yeovil Town	0–1	Wycombe Wanderers	Yeovil
15:00 BST		Report	Bean (yellow card) 73'; El-Abd (yellow card) 75'; Williams 79'	Stadium: Huish Park; Attendance: 3,307; Referee: Gavin Ward

17 April 2018 43	Lincoln City	0–0	Wycombe Wanderers	Lincoln
19:45 BST		Report	Tyson (yellow card) 20'; El-Abd (yellow card) 47'; McGinley (yellow card) 76'; Bean (yellow card) 76'	Stadium: Sincil Bank; Attendance: 8,948; Referee: John Brooks

21 April 2018 44	Wycombe Wanderers	0–4	Accrington Stanley	High Wycombe
15:00 BST	Cowan-Hall (yellow card) 62'	Report	Jackson 15'; Brown 33'; McConville 66'; Zanzala 90+5' (pen.)	Stadium: Adams Park; Attendance: 6,178; Referee: Darren Drysdale

28 April 2018 45	Chesterfield	1–2	Wycombe Wanderers	Chesterfield
15:00 BST	Harriman 39' (o.g.)	Report	Tyson 45+1'; O'Nien (yellow card) 60'; Gape 76'; Mackail-Smith (yellow card) 90+3'	Stadium: Proact Stadium; Attendance: 5,679; Referee: Anthony Backhouse

5 May 2018 46	Wycombe Wanderers	1–0	Stevenage	High Wycombe
15:00 BST	Bloomfield 19'	Report		Stadium: Adams Park; Attendance: 8,802; Referee: Martin Coy

=== FA Cup ===
5 November 2017 First round	Solihull Moors	0–2	Wycombe Wanderers	Solihull
14:00 GMT		Report	Freeman 16'; Mackail-Smith 28'; Stewart (yellow card) 41'; Bloomfield (yellow card) 64'	Stadium: Damson Park; Attendance: 1,545; Referee: Brett Huxtable

3 December 2017 Second round	Wycombe Wanderers	3–1	Leatherhead	High Wycombe
14:00 GMT	Jombati (yellow card) 7'; Saunders 29'; Southwell (yellow card) 36'; Jacobson (yellow card) 40'; Bloomfield (yellow card) 41'; Mackail-Smith 76'; Akinfenwa 90+1'	Report	Midson 8' (pen.); Moore (yellow card) 28' (yellow-red card) 78'; Clohessy (yellow card) 56'	Stadium: Adams Park; Attendance: 3,835; Referee: Tim Robinson

6 January 2017 Third round	Wycombe Wanderers	1–5	Preston North End	High Wycombe
15:00 GMT	O'Nien 45+1'	Report	Harrop 2', 85'; Browne 38', 78' (pen.); Horgan 50'; Boyle (yellow card) 89'	Stadium: Adams Park; Attendance: 4,928; Referee: Peter Bankes

=== EFL Cup ===
On 16 June 2017, Wycombe Wanderers were drawn at home to Fulham in the first round.

8 August 2017 First round	Wycombe Wanderers	0–2	Fulham	High Wycombe
19:45 BST		Report	Woodrow (yellow card) 32'; Piazon 67'; Odoi 81'	Stadium: Adams Park; Attendance: 3,639; Referee: Gavin Ward

=== EFL Trophy ===
On 12 July 2017, Wycombe Wanderers were drawn against Bristol Rovers, Swindon Town and West Ham United U23s in Southern Group C.

Pos	Lge	Team	Pld	W	D	L	GF	GA	GD	Pts	Qualification
1	L2	Swindon Town (Q)	3	2	0	1	7	5	+2	6	Round 2
2	ACA	West Ham United U21s (Q)	3	2	0	1	6	5	+1	6	Round 2
3	L1	Bristol Rovers (E)	3	1	0	2	8	8	0	3	
4	L2	Wycombe Wanderers (E)	3	1	0	2	3	6	−3	3	

Updated to match(es) played on 28 November. Source: EFL.com
(E) Eliminated; (Q) Qualified for the phase indicated

29 August 2017 Group Game 1	Wycombe Wanderers	1–5	Bristol Rovers	High Wycombe
19:45 BST	Southwell 5'	Report	Telford 9', 42'; Broom 54', 85'; Sercombe 63'	Stadium: Adams Park; Attendance: 1,132

31 October 2017 Group Game 2	Swindon Town	1–0	Wycombe Wanderers	Swindon
19:45 GMT	Preston 88'; Smith (yellow card) 90+2'	Report	Cowan-Hall (yellow card) 67'; Bean (yellow card) 82'	Stadium: County Ground; Attendance: 1,236; Referee: Kevin Johnson

28 November 2017 Group Game 3	Wycombe Wanderers	2–0	West Ham United U23s	High Wycombe
19:45 GMT	de Havilland 31'; Scarr (yellow card) 40'; Jombati 55'	Report	Neufville (yellow card) 31'	Stadium: Adams Park; Attendance: 699

== Team details ==
=== Squad information ===
No.	Nationality	Name	Age	Joined club (Note: Year that player became a Wycombe first-team player)
GOALKEEPERS
1	(England)	Scott Brown	41	2016
30	(Democratic Republic of the Congo)	Yves Ma-Kalambay	40	2017
DEFENDERS
2	(Portugal)	Sido Jombati	39	2014
3	(Wales)	Joe Jacobson	39	2014
5	(England)	Anthony Stewart	33	2015
6	(Egypt)	Adam El-Abd (c)	41	2017
15	(England)	Nathan McGinley†	29	2018
16	(Republic of Ireland)	Michael Harriman	33	2015
18	(England)	Tafari Moore†	29	2018
19	(England)	Will de Havilland	31	2016
28	(England)	Dan Scarr†	31	2017
MIDFIELDERS
4	(England)	Dominic Gape	32	2016
7	(England)	Sam Saunders	43	2017
8	(Jamaica)	Marcus Bean	41	2014
10	(England)	Matt Bloomfield	42	2003
17	(England)	Luke O'Nien	31	2015
22	(England)	Nick Freeman	30	2016
29	(England)	Curtis Thompson†	33	2018
44	(England)	Gareth Ainsworth	53	2009
FORWARDS
11	(England)	Scott Kashket	30	2016
12	(England)	Paris Cowan-Hall	35	2015
20	(England)	Adebayo Akinfenwa	44	2016
23	(England)	Nathan Tyson	44	2017
24	(England)	Randell Williams†	29	2018
25	(Scotland)	Craig Mackail-Smith	42	2017

† Loan player

=== Appearances and goals ===
As of 5 May 2018

No.	Pos	Nat	Player	Total		League Two		FA Cup		EFL Cup		EFL Trophy	
No.	Pos	Nat	Player	Apps	Goals	Apps	Goals	Apps	Goals	Apps	Goals	Apps	Goals
1	GK	(England) ENG	Scott Brown	51	0	46	0	3	0	1	0	1	0
2	DF	(Portugal) POR	Sido Jombati	23	2	20	1	1	0	0	0	2	1
3	DF	(Wales) WAL	Joe Jacobson	51	6	46	6	3	0	1	0	1	0
4	MF	(England) ENG	Dominic Gape	38	1	35	1	1	0	0	0	2	0
5	DF	(England) ENG	Anthony Stewart	21	1	17	1	2	0	0	0	2	0
6	DF	(Egypt) EGY	Adam El-Abd	43	1	36	1	3	0	1	0	3	0
7	MF	(England) ENG	Sam Saunders	27	2	22	1	3	1	0	0	2	0
8	MF	(Jamaica) JAM	Marcus Bean	36	2	31	2	2	0	1	0	2	0
10	MF	(England) ENG	Matt Bloomfield	43	3	37	3	3	0	1	0	2	0
11	FW	(England) ENG	Scott Kashket	10	1	9	1	1	0	0	0	0	0
12	FW	(England) ENG	Paris Cowan-Hall	39	8	34	8	2	0	1	0	2	0
15	DF	(England) ENG	Nathan McGinley	11	0	11	0	0	0	0	0	0	0
16	DF	(Republic of Ireland) IRL	Michael Harriman	20	1	18	1	0	0	1	0	1	0
17	MF	(England) ENG	Luke O'Nien	40	8	35	7	2	1	0	0	3	0
18	DF	(England) ENG	Tafari Moore	13	0	13	0	0	0	0	0	0	0
19	DF	(England) ENG	Will De Havilland	6	1	3	0	1	0	0	0	2	1
20	FW	(England) ENG	Adebayo Akinfenwa	46	18	42	17	3	1	1	0	0	0
21	DF	(Germany) GER	Max Müller (Note: Max Müller finished the season on loan at Morecambe.)	1	0	0	0	0	0	1	0	0	0
22	MF	(England) ENG	Nick Freeman	34	4	27	3	3	1	1	0	3	0
23	FW	(England) ENG	Nathan Tyson	35	8	33	8	1	0	1	0	0	0
24	FW	(England) ENG	Randell Williams	6	1	6	1	0	0	0	0	0	0
25	FW	(Scotland) SCO	Craig Mackail-Smith	43	10	41	8	2	2	0	0	0	0
28	DF	(England) ENG	Dan Scarr	26	1	22	1	3	0	0	0	1	0
29	MF	(England) ENG	Curtis Thompson	7	0	7	0	0	0	0	0	0	0
30	GK	(Democratic Republic of the Congo) COD	Yves Ma-Kalambay	3	0	1	0	0	0	0	0	2	0
44	MF	(England) ENG	Gareth Ainsworth	0	0	0	0	0	0	0	0	0	0
Players who left the club before the end of the season:
9	FW	(England) ENG	Paul Hayes	3	0	2	0	0	0	1	0	0	0
18	DF	(England) ENG	Daniel Rowe	1	0	0	0	0	0	1	0	0	0
13	GK	(England) ENG	Barry Richardson	0	0	0	0	0	0	0	0	0	0
24	DF	(England) ENG	Jack Williams	4	0	1	0	0	0	1	0	2	0
27	FW	(England) ENG	Eberechi Eze	22	5	20	5	0	0	0	0	2	0
15	FW	(England) ENG	Dayle Southwell	17	1	12	0	2	0	0	0	3	1
26	FW	(England) ENG	Josh Umerah	7	2	6	2	0	0	0	0	1	0

== Transfers ==
=== Transfers in ===
Date	Position	Nationality	Name	From	Fee	Ref.
3 July 2017	CB	(Egypt)	Adam El-Abd	Shrewsbury Town	Free	
25 July 2017	CF	(England)	Nathan Tyson	Kilmarnock	Free	
17 August 2017	CF	(Scotland)	Craig Mackail-Smith	Luton Town	Free	
2 October 2017	GK	(Democratic Republic of the Congo)	Yves Ma-Kalambay	Free agent	—N/a	

=== Transfers out ===
Date	Position	Nationality	Name	To	Fee	Ref.
1 July 2017	RW	(England)	Garry Thompson	Morecambe	Released	(Note: Following Thompson's release, he signed for Morecambe on 28 June 2017.)
1 July 2017	LM	(Antigua and Barbuda)	Myles Weston	Ebbsfleet United	Free	
1 July 2017	LM	(England)	Sam Wood	Eastleigh	Released	(Note: Following Wood's release, he signed for Eastleigh on 30 June 2017.)
21 July 2017	CB	(Grenada)	Aaron Pierre	Northampton Town	Free	
29 August 2017	CF	(England)	Paul Hayes	Hemel Hempstead Town	Released	(Note: Following Hayes's release, he signed for Hemel Hempstead Town on 22 September 2017.)
25 October 2017	DM	(England)	Daniel Rowe	York City	Free	(Note: Following Rowe's release, he signed for York City on 27 October 2017.)
29 December 2017	GK	(England)	Barry Richardson	Free agent	Released	
9 January 2018	CF	(England)	Dayle Southwell	Guiseley	Undisclosed	

=== Loans in ===
Start date	Position	Nationality	Name	From	End date	Ref.
31 July 2017	LB	(England)	Jack Williams	Queens Park Rangers	1 January 2018	
29 August 2017	CF	(England)	Josh Umerah	Charlton Athletic	15 January 2018	
30 August 2017	CF	(Nigeria)	Eberechi Eze	Queens Park Rangers	2 January 2018	
31 August 2017	CB	(England)	Dan Scarr	Birmingham City	End of season	(Note: On 11 December, Dan Scarr agreed to extend his loan until the end of the season.)
12 January 2018	RB	(England)	Tafari Moore	Arsenal	End of season	
12 January 2018	CB	(England)	Nathan McGinley	Middlesbrough	End of season	
19 January 2018	CF	(England)	Randell Williams	Watford	End of season	
26 January 2018	CM	(England)	Curtis Thompson	Notts County	End of season	

=== Loans out ===
Start date	Position	Nationality	Name	To	End date	Ref.
27 July 2017	CB	(England)	Will de Havilland	Aldershot Town	28 August 2017	
22 August 2017	CB	(Germany)	Max Müller	Morecambe	End of season	(Note: On 4 January, Max Müller agreed to extend his loan until the end of the season.)
22 September 2017	CB	(England)	Will de Havilland	Aldershot Town	24 October 2017	(Note: On 24 October, Wycombe Wanderers exercised the option to recall Will de Havilland from Aldershot Town.)
16 February 2018	CB	(England)	Will de Havilland	Maidstone United	16 April 2018	(Note: On 16 April, Wycombe Wanderers exercised the option to recall Will de Havilland from Maidstone United.)
