= Scott Kashket =

English footballer (born 1996)

Personal information
- Full name: Scott Connor Kashket
- Date of birth: 25 February 1996 (age 30)
- Place of birth: Chigwell, England
- Height: 5 ft 9 in (1.75 m)
- Position: Striker

Team information
- Current team: Brentwood Town

Youth career
- Buckhurst Hill
- 2012: Hércules
- 2013: Wingate & Finchley
- 2013–2014: Leyton Orient

Senior career*
Years	Team	Apps	(Gls)
2014–2016	Leyton Orient	16	(1)
2016	→ Welling United (loan)	7	(0)
2016–2021	Wycombe Wanderers	105	(22)
2021–2022	Crewe Alexandra	18	(1)
2022–2023	Gillingham	24	(2)
2023–2024	Sutton United	7	(0)
2024–2025	Hornchurch	8	(1)
2025	Welling United	13	(2)
2025	Bishop's Stortford	5	(2)
2025–2026	Canvey Island	11	(0)
2026–	Brentwood Town	0	(0)
- * Club domestic league appearances and goals as of 21:36, 30 January 2026 (UTC)

Scott Connor Kashket (born 25 February 1996) is an English professional footballer who plays as a striker for Isthmian League Premier Division club Wingate & Finchley.

He has also played in his youth career for Spanish B side club Hércules, Wingate & Finchley, and Leyton Orient, and in his senior career for League Two Leyton Orient, National League South Welling United (on loan), Wycombe Wanderers, Crewe Alexandra, Gillingham and Sutton United.

== Early life ==
Kashket was born in Chigwell, Essex, in England and is Jewish. His father Russell Kashket, and grandfather Bernard Kashket, are tailors and run Kashket & Partners, a UK company that traces its history back to being hatters at the court of the Russian Tsar in the early 1900s. His great-grandfather moved to London in the 1920s.

== Career ==
=== Early career ===
Kashket began his career playing futsal for Maccabi GB in the English National Futsal League. He played for the Team Maccabi Great Britain junior futsal team at the European Maccabiah Games in Vienna in 2009, winning a bronze medal.

He was spotted and signed at age 16 by Spanish B side club Hércules, following a spell with Buckhurst Hill, he played for their 16–19 and 18–21 age group football teams in late 2012.

Kashket returned to the UK, and played for the Wingate & Finchley U21 team. He scored three goals in two matches during October 2013.

He played for Team GB Under-18 at the 2013 Maccabiah Games in Israel, winning a bronze medal.

In November 2013, Kashket had a trial with Maccabi Tel Aviv. However, he suffered an ankle ligaments injury on his first day with the club.

=== Leyton Orient ===
By this time Kashket was training and playing with Leyton Orient's youth team. After impressing in the Orient youth team, Kashket at 17 years old signed a two-year professional contract with the club in the summer of 2014, while still featuring for the youth team. He scored a penalty in Orient's 3–2 friendly win at Dartford on 18 July, and came on as a substitute in the 1–0 friendly win at Northampton Town on 26 July, and the 2–2 draw with Queens Park Rangers on 29 July.

Kashket was an unused substitute for Orient in several matches in the early part of the 2014–15 season, and made his professional debut as a late substitute for Jay Simpson in the 2–0 league defeat at home to Preston North End on 29 October, which was manager Mauro Milanese's first match in charge of the club. On 11 November, he was brought on as a substitute (again for Simpson) early in the second half in Orient's 2–0 Football League Trophy southern section quarter-final win against Northampton Town.

Kashket made his first start for Orient on 11 August 2015, playing the full 90 minutes of the 2–1 League Cup defeat at MK Dons. He scored his first senior goal in the 2–2 draw at home to Oxford United on 17 October, coming on as a substitute for John Marquis and grabbing a last-minute equaliser. He was told chairman Francesco Becchetti had blocked him from playing. Kashket said: "He wouldn't even give me reasons why, he wouldn't even let me train. I just wanted to get out of there and make a fresh start as soon as possible."

On 4 March 2016, he moved to National League South Welling United on a one-month loan. On 31 August 2016 Kashket was released from Leyton Orient, for which he had made 22 appearances and scored once.

=== Wycombe Wanderers ===
The same day that Kashket was released, Wycombe Wanderers signed Kashket to a four-month deal, when he was 20 years old. He scored his first goals for Wycombe when he scored twice in a 5–1 win over Crewe Alexandra on 27 September 2016. Wycombe manager Gareth Ainsworth said, "We gave Scott the opportunity to prove himself ... and to say he exceeded expectations is an understatement." He won the Sky Bet League Two Player of the Month Award for December 2016.

In December 2016, after he had scored nine goals in nine games, the team signed Kashket to a new contract, until 2019. He suffered an injury, and missed the majority of the final third of the season in 2016. In the 2016-17 season, he made 21 appearances and had ten goals, a ratio of one every 117 minutes.

Kashket signed a new three-year contract with Wycombe in May 2019, until 2022; at the time that he signed the new contract, in his career with the team he had scored 23 times in 73 appearances. Coach Ainsworth said: "Scotty's got that fantastic ability of being able to change a game in an instant and he's the type of player that fans love to watch, so I'm thrilled to keep him here for another three years. He's still only 23 and I strongly believe he could go a long way in the game ...."

In January 2020 Kashket received a ban from all football activity for a period of two months, with an additional four months suspended, and a fine of £3,446.13 after he admitted to breaking the Football Association's betting rules after placing 183 bets on matches between 3 September 2014 and 22 August 2016, while at Leyton Orient.

On 30 August 2021, Kashket left the club by mutual consent in order to allow for him to sign with a new club ahead of the deadline the following day.

=== Crewe Alexandra ===
On 30 August 2021, having left Wycombe, Kashket joined League One side Crewe Alexandra on a one-year deal. He scored his first Crewe goal in a 1–1 draw at Plymouth Argyle on 28 September 2021. Kashket made 14 appearances for Crewe before sustaining an ankle injury at Ipswich Town on 28 November 2021. He made a return to competitive football on 29 March 2022, playing 30 minutes of a Cheshire Senior Cup semi-final at Stockport County, then starting in Crewe's next league game, against Fleetwood Town at Gresty Road on 2 April 2022. Kashket was released at the end of the 2021–22 season following relegation.

=== Gillingham ===
On 27 June 2022, Kashket signed for League Two side, Gillingham. He was released after one season at the club having scored three goals in 36 appearances.

=== Sutton United ===
On 25 July 2023, Kashket signed for another League Two side, Sutton United. He departed the club following relegation at the end of the 2023–24 season having failed to make an appearance since September 2023.

=== Non-League ===
On 20 September 2024 National League South side Hornchurch announced that Kashket had signed for the club. On 21 February 2025, Kashket returned to National League South side Welling United.

In September 2025, Kashket joined Southern League Premier Division Central club Bishop's Stortford. In November 2025, Kashket joined Isthmian League Premier Division club Canvey Island. He joined fellow Isthmian Premier Division side Brentwood Town in January 2026.

In September 2026, he rejoined Wingate & Finchley, scoring on his debut at Welling.

== Career statistics ==
As of end of 2024–25 season

Appearances and goals by club, season and competition
Club	Season	League			FA Cup		League Cup		Other		Total	
Club	Season	Division	Apps	Goals	Apps	Goals	Apps	Goals	Apps	Goals	Apps	Goals
Leyton Orient	2014–15	League One	1	0	0	0	0	0	2 (Note: Appearance(s) in Football League Trophy)	0	3	0
Leyton Orient	2015–16	League Two	15	1	2	0	1	0	1	0	19	1
Leyton Orient	Total		16	1	2	0	1	0	3	0	22	1
Welling United (loan)	2015–16	National League	7	0	—		—		—		7	0
Wycombe Wanderers	2016–17	League Two	21	10	3	3	0	0	5 (Note: Appearances in EFL Trophy)	3	29	16
Wycombe Wanderers	2017–18	League Two	9	1	1	0	0	0	0	0	10	1
Wycombe Wanderers	2018–19	League One	27	3	1	0	3	1	3	2	34	6
Wycombe Wanderers	2019–20	League One	19	4	1	0	1	0	4 (Note: Three appearances in FA Trophy and one appearance in the EFL League One play-offs)	0	25	4
Wycombe Wanderers	2020–21	Championship	29	4	1	0	1	0	0	0	31	4
Wycombe Wanderers	Total		105	22	7	3	5	1	12	5	129	31
Crewe Alexandra	2021–22	League One	18	1	1	0	—		—		19	1
Gillingham	2022–23	League Two	24	2	5	1	4	0	3	0	36	3
Sutton United	2023–24	League Two	7	0	0	0	2	0	1	0	10	0
Hornchurch	2024–25	National League South	8	1	2	0	—		0	0	10	1
Welling United	2024–25	National League South	13	2	0	0	—		0	0	13	2
Career total			191	29	17	4	12	1	19	5	239	39

== Honours ==
Wycombe Wanderers

- EFL League One play-offs: 2020

Individual

- EFL League Two Player of the Month: December 2016

== See also ==
- List of select Jewish football (association; soccer) players
