= Dayle Southwell =

English footballer

Personal information
- Full name: Dayle Southwell
- Date of birth: 20 October 1993 (age 33)
- Place of birth: Grimsby, England
- Height: 1.80 m (5 ft 11 in)
- Position: Forward

Team information
- Current team: Brigg Town

Youth career
- –2011: Grimsby Town

Senior career*
Years	Team	Apps	(Gls)
2011–2014	Grimsby Town	42	(3)
2013	→ Harrogate Town (loan)	3	(1)
2014–2016	Boston United	74	(52)
2016–2018	Wycombe Wanderers	25	(1)
2017	→ Lincoln City (loan)	2	(1)
2018	Guiseley	18	(7)
2018–2020	FC Halifax Town	38	(6)
2019–2020	→ Boston United (loan)	4	(0)
2020–2021	King's Lynn Town	23	(4)
2021–2023	Alfreton Town	73	(12)
2023–2025	Gainsborough Trinity	36	(7)
2025–2026	Grimsby Borough	5	(2)
2026–	Brigg Town	8	(1)

International career
2016	England C	1	(0)
- * Club domestic league appearances and goals as of 17:00, 29 August 2026 (UTC)

Dayle Southwell (born 20 October 1993) is an English professional footballer who plays as a forward for Brigg Town.

Southwell began his career with his home town team Grimsby Town and remained with the club for three seasons as well as a loan spell at Harrogate Town before being released in 2014. A prolific spell with Boston United that yielded 52 goals in 74 appearances later saw him move into the Football League with Wycombe Wanderers but he could not cement a regular place. He has since gone on to play back in Non-league and has turned out for Lincoln City, Guiseley, FC Halifax Town as well as a second spell with Boston before a move to King's Lynn Town. He is a former England C international having earned one cap in 2016 whilst a Boston United player.

== Club career ==
=== Grimsby Town ===
Southwell came up through the Grimsby Town youth system and at 17 made his first senior appearance in the 2010–11 season. Southwell remained with the Mariners for three years, but despite regular substitute appearances, he was only given 10 starting appearances. During this period he also had a short loan in the Conference North at Harrogate Town, scoring 1 in 3 appearances.

=== Boston United ===
Southwell signed for nearby Conference North club Boston United in the summer of 2014, searching for regular football. In his first season, he started 39 league games and scored 28 goals. By the end of his first season with The Pilgrims he had scored 30 times from his 42 starts in all competitions.

His 2015–16 season started in a similar fashion and, by Christmas, Southwell had scored 15 goals in his first 23 games of the season. After an injury to his foot kept Southwell sidelined for ten weeks, he returned on 24 February to score his 16th League goal of the season. By the end of the season Boston had reached the play-offs, with Southwell scoring 24 goals and receiving both the National League North Golden Boot and Boston's Player of the Season 2015–16.

=== Wycombe Wanderers ===
Southwell turned professional on 21 June 2016 signing a two-year contract with Wycombe Wanderers. On his first Adams Park appearance for Chairboys, he scored the equalising goal against Brentford in a pre-season friendly which finished 1–1. On 3 February 2017, Southwell signed on loan with Lincoln City. It was a one-month loan.

=== Non-League career ===
On 9 January 2018, Southwell signed for Guiseley.

On 13 June 2018 Southwell signed a two-year deal with FC Halifax Town. Southwell then returned to National League North club Boston United on an initial 1-month loan on 5 December 2019.

Southwell moved to King's Lynn Town F.C. in January 2020, signing a two-and-a-half-year deal.

On 15 July 2021, Southwell signed for Alfreton Town. He departed the club at the end of the 2022–23 season.

In May 2025, Southwell joined Northern Premier League Division One East side Grimsby Borough.

== International career ==
In May 2016, Southwell earned an England C call up for the forthcoming ICC fixture against Slovakia. It would prove to be his one and only England C appearance due to his new contract at Wycombe Wanderers.

== Career statistics ==
=== Club ===
As of end of 2024–25 season

Appearances and goals by club, season and competition
Club	Season	League			FA Cup		League Cup		Other		Total	
Club	Season	Division	Apps	Goals	Apps	Goals	Apps	Goals	Apps	Goals	Apps	Goals
Grimsby Town	2010–11	Conference Premier	3	0	0	0	—		0	0	3	0
Grimsby Town	2011–12	Conference Premier	1	0	1	1	—		2 (Note: Appearances in the FA Trophy)	0	4	1
Grimsby Town	2012–13	Conference Premier	30	2	1	0	—		4 (Note: One appearance in the Conference Premier play-offs, three in the FA Trophy)	0	35	2
Grimsby Town	2013–14	Conference Premier	8	1	1	0	—		4	4	13	5
Grimsby Town	Total		42	3	3	1	—		10	4	55	8
Harrogate Town (loan)	2013–14	Conference North	3	1	—		—		—		3	1
Boston United	2014–15	Conference North	40	28	2	1	—		4 (Note: Two appearances and one goal in the FA Trophy, two in the Conference North play-offs)	1	46	30
Boston United	2015–16	National League North	34	24	1	0	—		3 (Note: One appearance in the FA Trophy, one in the Conference North play-offs)	0	38	24
Boston United	Total		74	52	3	1	—		7	1	84	54
Wycombe Wanderers	2016–17	League Two	13	1	0	0	1	0	1 (Note: Appearances in the EFL Trophy)	0	15	1
Wycombe Wanderers	2017–18	League Two	12	0	2	0	0	0	3	1	17	1
Wycombe Wanderers	Total		25	1	2	0	1	0	4	1	32	2
Lincoln City (loan)	2016–17	National League	2	0	1	0	—		0	0	3	0
Guiseley	2017–18	National League	18	7	0	0	—		0	0	18	7
FC Halifax Town	2018–19	National League	31	6	4	1	—		3	1	38	8
FC Halifax Town	2019–20	National League	7	0	1	0	—		1	0	9	0
FC Halifax Town	Total		38	6	5	1	—		4	1	47	8
Boston United (loan)	2019–20	National League North	4	0	0	0	—		0	0	4	0
King's Lynn Town	2019–20	National League North	7	0	0	0	—		0	0	7	0
King's Lynn Town	2020–21	National League	16	4	2	1	—		2	0	20	5
King's Lynn Town	Total		23	4	2	1	—		2	0	27	5
Alfreton Town	2021–22	National League North	40	6	1	0	—		3	0	44	6
Alfreton Town	2022–23	National League North	33	6	0	0	—		2 (Note: One appearance in FA Trophy, one appearance in National League North play-offs)	0	35	6
Alfreton Town	Total		73	12	1	0	0	0	5	0	79	12
Gainsborough Trinity	2023–24	NPL Premier Division	27	7	0	0	—		2 (Note: One appearance and one goal in Lincolnshire Senior Cup, one appearance in FA Trophy)	1	29	8
Gainsborough Trinity	2024–25	NPL Premier Division	9	0	2	1	—		0	0	11	1
Gainsborough Trinity	Total		36	7	2	1	0	0	2	1	40	9
Career total			338	93	19	5	1	0	34	9	392	106

== Honours ==
=== Individual ===
- Conference North Team of the Year: 2014–15
