= Max Müller (footballer) =

German footballer

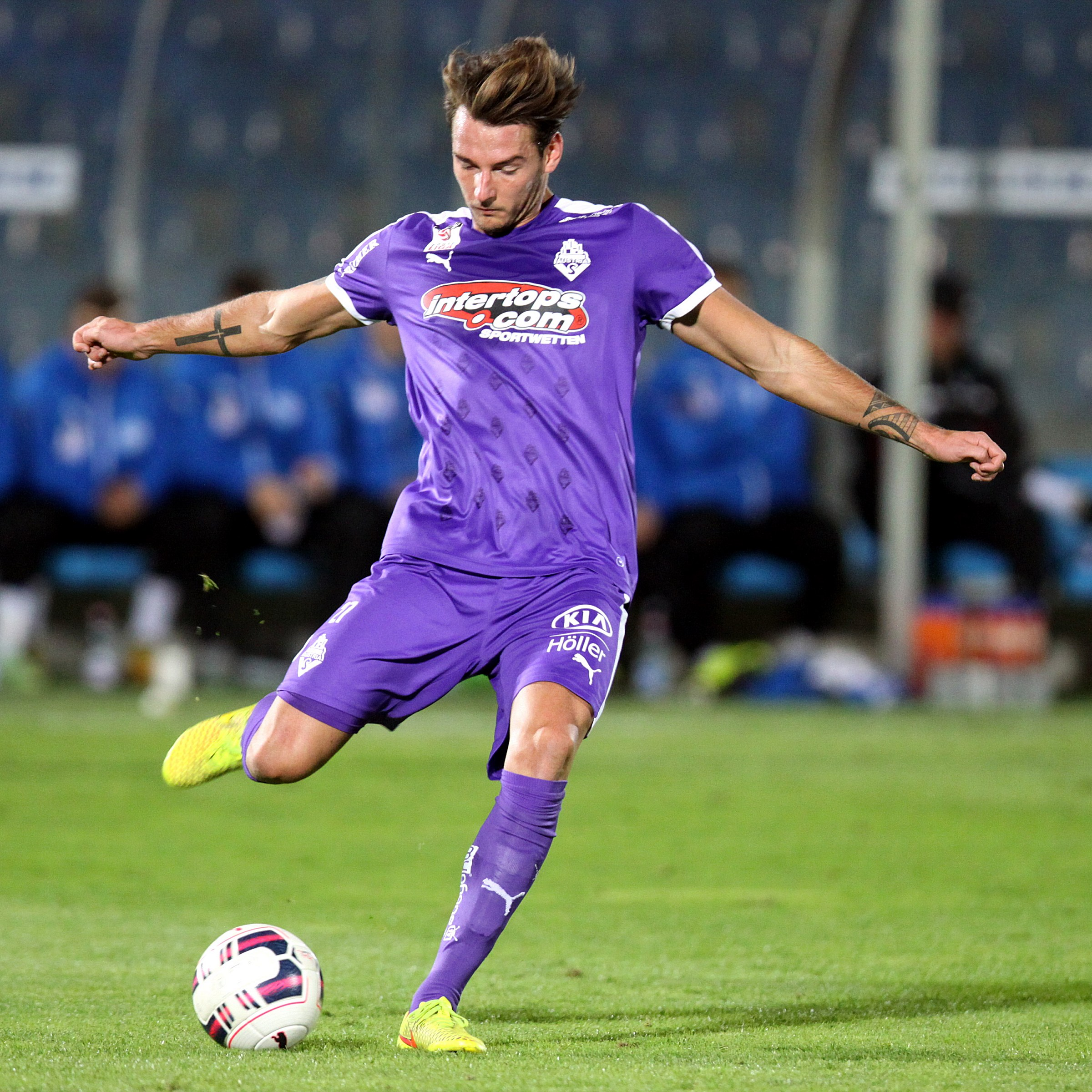
- Müller in 2015

Personal information
- Date of birth: 16 May 1994 (age 32)
- Place of birth: Speyer, Germany
- Height: 1.93 m (6 ft 4 in)
- Position: Defender

Team information
- Current team: FC Astoria Walldorf
- Number: 27

Senior career*
Years	Team	Apps	(Gls)
2013–2015	SV Sandhausen	0	(0)
2015–2016	Austria Salzburg	20	(1)
2016–2018	Wycombe Wanderers	9	(0)
2017–2018	→ Morecambe (loan)	20	(0)
2018–	FC Astoria Walldorf	120	(5)
- * Club domestic league appearances and goals as of 1 January 2025

Max Müller (born 16 May 1994) is a German professional footballer who plays as a defender for FC Astoria Walldorf.

== Career ==
Müller spent his early career with SV Sandhausen and Austria Salzburg, before signing for English club Wycombe Wanderers in August 2016. He joined Morecambe on loan on 22 August 2017.

He was released by Wycombe at the end of the 2017–18 season.

Following his release from Wycombe, he returned to Germany and signed for FC Astoria Walldorf on 22 May 2018.

== Career statistics ==
As of 23 May 2018

Appearances and goals by club, season and competition
Club	Season	League			National Cup		League Cup		Other		Total	
Club	Season	Division	Apps	Goals	Apps	Goals	Apps	Goals	Apps	Goals	Apps	Goals
SV Sandhausen	2013–14	2. Bundesliga	0	0	0	0	0	0	0	0	0	0
SV Sandhausen	2014–15	2. Bundesliga	0	0	0	0	0	0	0	0	0	0
SV Sandhausen	Total		0	0	0	0	0	0	0	0	0	0
Austria Salzburg	2015–16	Erste Liga	20	1	2	0	0	0	0	0	22	1
Wycombe Wanderers	2016–17	League Two	9	0	0	0	0	0	3 (Note: Appearances in the Football League Trophy)	0	12	0
Wycombe Wanderers	2017–18	League Two	0	0	0	0	1	0	0	0	1	0
Wycombe Wanderers	Total		9	0	0	0	1	0	3	0	13	0
Morecambe (loan)	2017–18	League Two	20	0	2	0	0	0	2	0	24	0
Career total			49	1	4	0	1	0	4	0	58	1
