= Sido Jombati =

Portuguese footballer (born 1987)

Personal information
- Full name: Sido Coelho Jombati
- Date of birth: 20 August 1987 (age 39)
- Place of birth: Lisbon, Portugal
- Height: 1.92 m (6 ft 4 in)
- Positions: Right back; centre back

Youth career
- 1995–1997: AFD Torre
- 1997–2002: Sporting CP
- 2002–2005: Casa Pia

Senior career*
Years	Team	Apps	(Gls)
2005	Exeter City	0	(0)
2005–2008	Weymouth		
2008–2009	Basingstoke Town		
2009–2011	Bath City	82	(3)
2011–2014	Cheltenham Town	116	(5)
2014–2020	Wycombe Wanderers	154	(5)
2020–2021	Oldham Athletic	19	(0)
2021–2023	Ebbsfleet United	48	(1)
2023–2025	Salisbury	77	(8)
- * Club domestic league appearances and goals as of 14:31, 19 August 2025 (UTC)

Sido Coelho Jombati (born 20 August 1987) is a Portuguese footballer who most recently played as a right back or centre back for Salisbury. He has played in the English Football League for Cheltenham Town, Wycombe Wanderers and Oldham Athletic.

== Early and personal life ==
Born in Lisbon to Angola-Guinea parents, Jombati started his football career with his local team in Portugal, Sporting CP, but he was released at the age of sixteen. He was encouraged to come to England by his family, and ended up having a successful trial at Conference National club Exeter City.

== Career ==
=== Weymouth & Basingstoke Town ===
His stay at Exeter was brief, only staying there a month, before moving on to Conference South club Weymouth. During the 2005–06 season he helped Weymouth gain promotion to the Conference National finishing as champions. In the summer of 2008 he joined Conference South team, Basingstoke Town. Immediately settled at the Camrose and went on to make 52 appearances, scoring on four occasions, in a variety of positions. The Taunton-based player was named Basingstoke supporters' player of the year but jumped at the chance to join Bath City at the end of the season, so that he could move closer to his family, who lived in Somerset.

=== Bath City ===
During his first season at Bath the club earned promotion to the Conference, after beating Woking in the play-off final. Jombati enjoyed another season at Twerton Park, earning the Player of the Season award before moving to Cheltenham Town in the Football League for a nominal fee.

=== Cheltenham Town ===
He made his professional debut on 20 August 2011, in the League Two win over Northampton Town, 3–2 at Sixfields.

In May 2014, Jombati left Cheltenham, after the expiry of his contract. Later that month however, he was signed by League Two club Wycombe Wanderers on a two-year contract.

In December 2019, Jombati was voted for the team of the decade at Cheltenham Town. The vote took place on a Twitter poll and he received 62.5% of the votes showing he was one of the favorite players for the Robins.

=== Wycombe Wanderers ===
Jombati earned a two-year deal with Wycombe in May 2014, soon after he scored his first goal for Wycombe in a 4–0 FA Cup win over FC Halifax Town on 8 November 2015.

In May 2018, he signed a new two-year contract with Wycombe Wanderers after making 23 appearances in the promotion winning 2017/18 season, Jombati was rewarded with a new two-year deal until the end of the 2019–20 season and he proved his worth throughout the club’s first year back in League 1, starring at centre-back for long periods of the campaign.

In July 2020, along with his team, Jombati gained promotion to the Championship with Wycombe Wanderers after they defeated Oxford United in the final, though Jombati did not appear in the final. His contract with Wycombe Wanderers expired at the end of the season and was not renewed.

=== Oldham Athletic ===
Jombati signed for League Two side Oldham Athletic in August 2020 on a one-year contract.

=== Ebbsfleet United ===
In June 2021, Jombati joined National League South side Ebbsfleet United.

=== Salisbury ===
In July 2023, Jombati joined Southern League Premier Division South side Salisbury and was made captain. He made his debut against Beaconsfield Town, scoring a last-minute penalty to level the game 1-1. On 6 May 2024, following a third-place finish in the league and a victory in the play-off semi-final against Gosport Borough five days prior, Jombati and his Salisbury team competed in the Southern League Premier Division South play-off final against AFC Totton. After a 2-2 draw in extra time, Jombati converted his spot-kick in the subsequent shootout, helping Salisbury secure victory on penalties and gain promotion to the National League South for the 2024-25 season. His performance in the final earned him widespread acclaim from fans and was considered by many as a man-of-the-match display.

Jombati was released at the end of the 2024-25 season after a further 39 appearances in the National League South for The Whites.

== Career statistics ==
As of match played 16 January 2021

Appearances and goals by club, season and competition
Club	Season	League			FA Cup		League Cup		Other		Total	
Club	Season	Division	Apps	Goals	Apps	Goals	Apps	Goals	Apps	Goals	Apps	Goals
Bath City	2009–10	Conference South	39	1	4	0	—		4 (Note: One appearance in FA Trophy, three appearances in Conference South play-offs)	0	47	1
Bath City	2010–11	Conference Premier	43	2	2	1	—		2 (Note: Appearances in FA Trophy)	0	47	3
Bath City	Total		82	3	6	1	—		6	0	94	4
Cheltenham Town	2011–12	League Two	36	3	3	0	0	0	6 (Note: Three appearances in Football League Trophy, three appearances in League Two play-offs)	0	45	3
Cheltenham Town	2012–13	League Two	37	1	3	0	1	0	3 (Note: One appearance in Football League Trophy, two appearances in League Two play-offs)	0	44	1
Cheltenham Town	2013–14	League Two	43	1	0	0	1	0	1 (Note: Appearance in Football League Trophy)	0	45	1
Cheltenham Town	Total		116	5	6	0	2	0	10	0	134	5
Wycombe Wanderers	2014–15	League Two	35	0	2	0	1	0	1	0	39	0
Wycombe Wanderers	2015–16	League Two	34	1	2	1	1	0	1	0	38	1
Wycombe Wanderers	2016–17	League Two	25	2	2	0	1	0	6 (Note: Appearances in EFL Trophy)	0	34	2
Wycombe Wanderers	2017–18	League Two	20	1	1	0	0	0	2	1	23	2
Wycombe Wanderers	2018–19	League One	33	1	1	0	3	0	3	0	40	1
Wycombe Wanderers	2019–20	League One	7	0	1	0	0	0	3	0	11	0
Wycombe Wanderers	Total		154	5	9	1	6	0	16	1	185	7
Oldham Athletic	2020–21	League Two	12	0	1	0	2	0	4	0	19	0
Career total			364	13	22	2	10	0	32	1	428	16

== Honours ==
Bath City

- Conference South play-offs: 2010

Wycombe Wanderers

- EFL League One play-offs: 2020
- EFL League Two third-place promotion: 2017–18

Ebbsfleet United

- National League South: 2022–23

Salisbury

- Southern League Premier Division South play-offs: 2024
