= Paris Cowan-Hall =

English footballer

Personal information
- Full name: Paris Declan Joseph Cowan-Hall
- Date of birth: 5 October 1990 (age 36)
- Place of birth: Hillingdon, England
- Height: 1.78 m (5 ft 10 in)
- Positions: Forward; winger

Team information
- Current team: Dunstable Town

Youth career
- –2007: Rushden & Diamonds
- 2007–2010: Portsmouth

Senior career*
Years	Team	Apps	(Gls)
2010	Portsmouth	0	(0)
2010	→ Grimsby Town (loan)^{1}	1	(0)
2010	→ Grimsby Town (loan)	2	(0)
2010–2011	Scunthorpe United	1	(0)
2011	→ Rushden & Diamonds (loan)	3	(1)
2011–2012	Woking	36	(13)
2012–2013	Plymouth Argyle	40	(3)
2013–2015	Wycombe Wanderers	45	(10)
2015–2017	Millwall	8	(0)
2015	→ Bristol Rovers (loan)	3	(0)
2016–2017	→ Wycombe Wanderers (loan)	21	(3)
2017–2019	Wycombe Wanderers	79	(14)
2019–2021	Colchester United	18	(0)
2025–	Dunstable Town	1	(0)
- * Club domestic league appearances and goals as of 16:28, 19 September 2025 (UTC)

Paris Declan Joseph Cowan-Hall (born 5 October 1990) is an English former professional footballer who plays as a forward and winger for club Dunstable Town.

Having started his career as a youngster at Portsmouth, he went on to play in the Football League for Grimsby Town, Scunthorpe United, Plymouth Argyle, Wycombe Wanderers, Millwall, Bristol Rovers and Colchester United. He also played non-league football for Rushden & Diamonds and Woking.

== Club career ==
=== Portsmouth ===
Cowan-Hall joined Premier League side Portsmouth from non-league outfit Rushden & Diamonds in 2007. Before he joined Pompey, he previously spent time on trial with Manchester United and Chelsea as a 16-year-old. He made his way into the Portsmouth reserve side where he made success and flew out with the Portsmouth first team to Portugal in their 2009 pre-season, where he made an appearance against Vitória de Guimarães.

On 2 January 2010, Cowan-Hall joined Grimsby Town on loan, making his first appearance as a late substitute in injury time against Bury. The following week, Cowan-Hall missed the league clash with Cheltenham Town due to tonsillitis, and several days later he was forced to cut short his loan spell after contracting glandular fever. On 27 January 2010, Cowan-Hall re-signed for Grimsby for a second loan spell, this time until the end of the 2009–10 season. However, in March 2010 he returned to Portsmouth early with a hamstring injury after making only two substitute appearances in his second spell at Blundell Park. He was released by Portsmouth in July 2010 after the club's relegation from the Premier League.

=== Scunthorpe United ===
Following his release from Portsmouth, Cowan-Hall had trials at Burnley, Hull City, Brighton & Hove Albion, Derby County and Oldham Athletic.

In October 2010, Cowan-Hall made an appearance for Scunthorpe United reserves on trial. After impressing he was invited back to their reserve match the next week. He scored the only goal of the game against Leeds United reserves at Elland Road. Following this performance, in October 2010, he was offered a place at Scunthorpe United on non-contract terms until the end of the 2010–11 season. In February 2011, Cowan-Hall returned to Rushden & Diamonds on loan. On his return to Irtlingborough, he scored on his debut against Eastbourne Borough. Cowan-Hall was released by the Iron in May 2011.

=== Woking ===
In July 2011, Cowan-Hall appeared for Gillingham on trial, scoring once against Erith & Belvedere. In August 2011, Cowan-Hall appeared for Newport County on trial, scoring once against Welsh Football League side Undy.

Cowan-Hall signed for Woking on 12 August 2011. He made his debut with the club a day later, against Sutton United. He scored his first goal for Woking going on 3 September, against Welling United. Cowan-Hall went on to win both October and November player of the month for the club.

=== Plymouth Argyle ===
Cowan-Hall signed for Plymouth Argyle on 29 May 2012 after rejecting a new contract offer from Woking. He joined the club on 1 July for an undisclosed fee, with Plymouth paying Woking compensation due to his age. He scored on his competitive debut in a 3–0 Football League Cup win against Portsmouth on 14 August. Cowan-Hall scored his first goal in the Football League on 13 October in a 4–1 win at Barnet.

=== Wycombe Wanderers ===
On 25 June 2013, Cowan-Hall signed for Wycombe Wanderers on a two-year contract. On 3 August 2013, Cowan-Hall made his debut appearance for Wycombe Wanderers in a league fixture against Morecambe, and scored a first half winner for the club, in a 1–0 victory. His final goal for the club came in the League Two home draw, against Luton Town. His final match for Wycombe came just two days later, in a goalless draw away at Shrewsbury Town.

=== Millwall ===
In January 2015 on the opening of the transfer window, Cowan-Hall joined Millwall on a 2 1/2-year contract.

==== Wycombe Wanderers (loan) ====
Cowan-Hall returned on loan to Wycombe Wanderers on 23 January 2016 until the end of the season.

On 29 June 2016 Cowan-Hall once again returned to Wycombe Wanderers on loan until 31 January 2017.

=== Wycombe Wanderers (second spell) ===
Cowan-Hall's contract with Millwall was terminated by mutual consent on 31 January 2017 and on 1 February 2017 he re-signed for Wycombe Wanderers until June 2019.

He was released by Wycombe at the end of the 2018–19 season.

=== Colchester United ===
On 4 July 2019, Cowan-Hall signed for League Two side Colchester United on a two-year contract. He made his debut on 24 August as a substitute for Courtney Senior in Colchester's 1–0 win against Northampton Town. He scored his first goals for the club with a brace in a 3–2 EFL Trophy win against Gillingham on 3 September 2019.

Having made just 25 appearances for the club in two years, Cowan-Hall was released by Colchester at the end of his contract in May 2021.

=== Dunstable Town ===
In September 2025, Cowan-Hall returned to football, joining Spartan South Midlands League Premier Division club Dunstable Town.

== Career statistics ==
As of match played 2 April 2021.

Appearances and goals by club, season and competition
Club	Season	League			FA Cup		League Cup		Other		Total	
Club	Season	Division	Apps	Goals	Apps	Goals	Apps	Goals	Apps	Goals	Apps	Goals
Grimsby Town (loan)	2009–10	League Two	3	0	0	0	0	0	0	0	3	0
Scunthorpe United	2010–11	Championship	1	0	0	0	0	0	—		1	0
Rushden & Diamonds (loan)	2010–11	Conference Premier	3	1	0	0	—		0	0	3	1
Woking	2011–12	Conference South	36	13	2	1	—		0	0	38	14
Plymouth Argyle	2012–13	League Two	40	3	1	0	2	1	2 (Note: Appearance(s) in Football League Trophy)	1	45	5
Wycombe Wanderers	2013–14	League Two	25	4	3	1	1	0	1	0	30	5
Wycombe Wanderers	2014–15	League Two	20	6	1	0	1	0	1	0	23	6
Wycombe Wanderers	Total		45	10	4	1	2	0	2	0	53	11
Millwall	2014–15	Championship	5	0	—		—		—		5	0
Millwall	2015–16	League One	3	0	1	0	1	0	1	0	6	0
Millwall	Total		8	0	1	0	1	0	1	0	11	0
Bristol Rovers (loan)	2015–16	League Two	3	0	—		—		—		3	0
Wycombe Wanderers (loan)	2015–16	League Two	5	1	—		—		—		5	1
Wycombe Wanderers (loan)	2016–17	League Two	16	2	2	1	0	0	1 (Note: Appearance(s) in EFL Trophy)	0	19	3
Wycombe Wanderers (loan)	Total		21	3	2	1	0	0	1	0	24	4
Wycombe Wanderers	2016–17	League Two	12	2	1	0	0	0	2	0	15	2
Wycombe Wanderers	2017–18	League Two	34	8	2	0	1	0	2	0	39	8
Wycombe Wanderers	2018–19	League One	33	4	1	0	2	1	2	0	31	5
Wycombe Wanderers	Total		79	14	4	0	3	1	6	0	92	15
Colchester United	2019–20	League Two	5	0	0	0	2	0	3 (Note: One appearance and two goals in EFL Trophy, two appearances in EFL League Two play-offs)	2	10	2
Colchester United	2020–21	League Two	13	0	0	0	0	0	2	0	15	0
Colchester United	Total		18	0	0	0	2	0	5	2	25	2
Career total			257	44	14	3	10	2	17	3	298	52

== Notes ==
1. Soccerbase's stats for the match between Grimsby Town and Bury on 2 January 2010 (which happen to be his senior debut) fail to include the appearance by Cowan-Hall. Therefore, until and unless they correct it, he should have one more appearance for Grimsby than given on his Soccerbase page.
