= 2016–17 Wycombe Wanderers F.C. season =

Wycombe Wanderers F.C.
2016–17 season
- Chairman: Andrew Howard
- Manager: Gareth Ainsworth
- Stadium: Adams Park
- League Two: 9th
- FA Cup: Fourth round (eliminated by Tottenham Hotspur)
- League Cup: First round (eliminated by Bristol City)
- League Trophy: Semi-final (eliminated by Coventry City)
- Top goalscorer: League: Adebayo Akinfenwa (11); All: Adebayo Akinfenwa (17)
- Highest home attendance: 6,312 vs. Stourbridge, 7 January 2017
- Lowest home attendance: 912 vs. Coventry City, 9 November 2016
Home colours	Away colours

The 2016–17 season was Wycombe Wanderers' 130th season in existence and their 24th consecutive season in the Football League.

== Competitions ==
=== Pre-season friendlies ===
12 July 2016	Le Havre	1–1	Wycombe Wanderers	Sarzeau, France
19:30 CEST	Duhamel 65'	Report	Stone 90+2'	Stadium: Parc des Sports

19 July 2016	Wycombe Wanderers	1–1	Brentford	High Wycombe
19:45 BST	Southwell 78'	Report	Egan 40'	Stadium: Adams Park; Attendance: 1,338 (378 from Brentford); Referee: Mick Russell

22 July 2016	Wycombe Wanderers	0–0	Queens Park Rangers	High Wycombe
19:45 BST		Report		Stadium: Adams Park; Attendance: 2,575 (1,007 from QPR); Referee: Charles Breakspear

26 July 2016	Aldershot Town	2–1	Wycombe Wanderers	Aldershot
19:30 BST	Rendell 8'; McClure 9'	Report	De Havilland 88'	Stadium: Recreation Ground

30 July 2016	Maidenhead United	1–4	Wycombe Wanderers	Maidenhead
15:00 BST	Tarpey 10'		Thompson 25' 31'; O'Nien 59'; Wood 65'	Stadium: York Road

=== League Two ===
==== League table ====
Pos	Team	Pld	W	D	L	GF	GA	GD	Pts	Promotion, qualification or relegation
7	Blackpool (O, P)	46	18	16	12	69	46	+23	70	Qualification for League Two play-offs (Note: Four teams play for one spot and promotion to EFL League One)
8	Colchester United	46	19	12	15	67	57	+10	69	
9	Wycombe Wanderers	46	19	12	15	58	53	+5	69	
10	Stevenage	46	20	7	19	67	63	+4	67	
11	Cambridge United	46	19	9	18	58	50	+8	66	

Updated to match(es) played on 6 May 2017. Source: BBC Sport
Rules for classification: 1) Points; 2) Goal difference; 3) Number of goals scored
(O) Play-off winners; (P) Promoted

==== Results summary ====
Round	1	2	3	4	5	6	7	8	9	10	11	12	13	14	15	16	17	18	19	20	21	22	23	24	25	26	27	28	29	30	31	32	33	34	35	36	37	38	39	40	41	42	43	44	45	46
Ground	A	H	H	A	H	A	A	H	A	H	H	A	A	H	A	H	A	A	H	A	H	A	A	H	H	H	A	H	A	A	H	A	H	A	A	H	H	A	H	A	H	H	A	H	A	H
Result	L	W	D	D	L	L	L	W	L	W	W	L	D	L	D	W	W	W	W	W	W	D	W	W	D	D	L	W	L	L	L	L	L	D	W	D	D	W	L	W	D	L	W	W	D	W
Position	20	13	14	15	19	22	22	19	21	19	15	16	16	21	21	16	10	8	7	6	6	6	6	5	5	5	7	6	8	8	9	10	11	11	10	11	11	10	11	10	11	13	13	9	11	9

Updated to match(es) played on 6 May 2017. Source: BBC Sport
A = Away; H = Home; W = Win; D = Draw; L = Loss

Overall								Home						Away					
Pld	W	D	L	GF	GA	GD	Pts	W	D	L	GF	GA	GD	W	D	L	GF	GA	GD
46	19	12	15	58	53	+5	69	11	6	6	29	21	+8	8	6	9	29	32	−3

Last updated: 6 May 2017.
Source: BBC Sport

==== Matches ====
Win	Draw	Loss

6 August 2016 1	Crawley Town	1–0	Wycombe Wanderers	Crawley
15:00 BST	Boldewijn (yellow card) 54'; Smith 59'; Banton (yellow card) 79'; Blackman (red card) 90+2'; Harrold (yellow card) 90+4'	Report	Jacobson (yellow card) 78'	Stadium: Broadfield Stadium; Attendance: 2,471 (762 Away fans); Referee: Nick Kinseley

13 August 2016 2	Wycombe Wanderers	2–1	Grimsby Town	High Wycombe
15:00 BST	McGinn (yellow card) 38'; Jombati 55'; Stewart 90+1'	Report	Bolarinwa (yellow card) 47'; Boyce 79'; Berrett (yellow card) 89'	Stadium: Adams Park; Attendance: 3,686 (697); Referee: Andy Davies)

16 August 2016 3	Wycombe Wanderers	1–1	Accrington Stanley	High Wycombe
19:45 BST	Akinfenwa 5'; Jacobson (yellow card) 45+2'; Thompson (yellow card) 83'	Report	McConville (yellow card) 6' (goal) 48'; Eagles (yellow card) 26'; Pearson (yellow card) 44'	Stadium: Adams Park; Attendance: 2,747 (51 from Accrington); Referee: Brendan Malone

20 August 2016 4	Blackpool	0–0	Wycombe Wanderers	Blackpool
15:00 BST	Robertson (yellow card) 46'; Pugh (yellow card) 70'	Report	Hayes (yellow card) 81'	Stadium: Bloomfield Road; Attendance: 3,144; Referee: Ollie Yates

27 August 2016 5	Wycombe Wanderers	0–2	Colchester United	High Wycombe
15:00 BST	Thompson (yellow card) 37'; Harriman (yellow card) 41'; Bean (yellow card) 58'; Akinfenwa (yellow card) 76'; Bloomfield (yellow card) 83'; Jombati (yellow card) 90'	Report	Porter 63'; Szmodics 82'	Stadium: Adams Park; Attendance: 3,439 (Inc. 503 from Colchester); Referee: John Brooks

3 September 2016 6	Luton Town	4–1	Wycombe Wanderers	Luton
15:00 BST	Hylton 10', 56', 88' (pen.); McGeehan (yellow card) 24'; Cook (yellow card) 31' (goal) 90'; Smith (yellow card) 69'	Report	McGinn (yellow card) 20'; Bloomfield 63' (yellow card) 70'; Hayes (yellow card) 90+3'	Stadium: Kenilworth Road; Attendance: 8,097 (Away: 530); Referee: Graham Scott

10 September 2016 7	Portsmouth	4–2	Wycombe Wanderers	Portsmouth
15:00 BST	Roberts (yellow card) 28', (goal) 45' (pen.); Burgess 34'; Chaplin 45+4'; Baker 53' (yellow card) 72'	Report	Hayes 10', 45+1'; Pierre (yellow card) 28'; Jombati (yellow card) 42'; Thompson (yellow card) 45+6'; Gape (yellow card) 61'; Harriman (yellow card) 65'; Blackman (yellow card) 72'; Stewart (yellow card) 90+1'	Stadium: Fratton Park; Attendance: 16,262 (489 from Wycombe); Referee: Tim Robinson

17 September 2016 8	Wycombe Wanderers	1–0	Stevenage	High Wycombe
15:00 BST	Gape (yellow card) 14'; Southwell 45+3'; Cowan-Hall (yellow card) 82'	Report	Tonge (yellow card) 34'; Franks (yellow card) 52'	Stadium: Adams Park; Attendance: 3,181 (292 from Stevenage); Referee: Graham Horwood

24 September 2016 9	Carlisle United	1–0	Wycombe Wanderers	Carlisle
15:00 BST	Miller 57'; Jones (yellow card) 64'	Report	Jombati (yellow card) 12'; Harriman (yellow card) 71'; Stewart (yellow card) 90+3'	Stadium: Brunton Park; Attendance: 4,354 (Away 116); Referee: Seb Stockbridge

27 September 2016 10	Wycombe Wanderers	5–1	Crewe Alexandra	High Wycombe
19:45 BST	Wood 19'; Cowan-Hall 39' (yellow card) 58'; Gape 43'; Kashket 63', 69'; Harriman (yellow card) 76'	Report	Cooper 71'	Stadium: Adams Park; Attendance: 2,572; Referee: John Busby

1 October 2016 11	Wycombe Wanderers	1–0	Exeter City	High Wycombe
15:00 BST	Rowe (yellow card) 45+1'; Jacobson (yellow card) 74'; Akinfenwa 85'	Report	Taylor (yellow card) 81'	Stadium: Adams Park; Attendance: 3,297; Referee: Nick Kinseley

8 October 2016 12	Yeovil Town	1–0	Wycombe Wanderers	Yeovil
15:00 BST	Hedges 36'	Report		Stadium: Huish Park Stadium; Attendance: 3,187; Referee: Lee Probert

15 October 2016 13	Mansfield Town	1–1	Wycombe Wanderers	Mansfield
15:00 BST	Pearce (yellow card) 42'; Collins (yellow card) 79'; Green 81'	Report	Bloomfield 23' (yellow card) 71'; Gape (yellow card) 88'	Stadium: One Call Stadium; Attendance: 2,898; Referee: Brett Huxtable

22 October 2016 14	Wycombe Wanderers	0–2	Barnet	High Wycombe
15:00 BST	Weston (yellow card) 83' (yellow-red card) 90'	Report	Champion (yellow card) 64'; Vilhete 65' (yellow card) 90+3'; Akinde (yellow card) 71' (goal) 90+3'	Stadium: Adams Park; Attendance: 3,596; Referee: Graham Horwood

29 October 2016 15	Doncaster Rovers	2–2	Wycombe Wanderers	Doncaster
15:00 BST	Rowe 29'; Marquis 40'; Baudry (yellow card) 81'	Report	Bloomfield 19', 78'; De Havilland (yellow card) 75'; Harriman (yellow card) 87'	Stadium: Keepmoat Stadium; Attendance: 5,287; Referee: Lee Probert

12 November 2016 16	Wycombe Wanderers	2–0	Morecambe	High Wycombe
15:00 GMT	Pierre (yellow card) 34' (goal) 47'; Jacobson (yellow card) 72'; O'Nien 81'	Report	Jennings (yellow card) 8'; Winnard (yellow card) 25'; Rose (yellow card) 45+3'; Mullin (yellow card) 56'	Stadium: Adams Park; Attendance: 3,019; Referee: Darren Handley

19 November 2016 17	Cambridge United	1–2	Wycombe Wanderers	Cambridge
15:00 GMT	Roberts (yellow card) 21'; Legge (yellow card) 60'; Maris 87'	Report	Hayes 6' (pen.); Pierre (yellow card) 22' (goal) 90+5'; Gape (yellow card) 53'; O'Nien (yellow card) 57'; Stewart (yellow card) 63'	Stadium: Abbey Stadium; Attendance: 4,139; Referee: Trevor Kettle

22 November 2016 18	Newport County	0–1	Wycombe Wanderers	Newport
19:45 GMT	Jebb (yellow card) 43'; Owen-Evans (yellow card) 71'; Sheehan (yellow card) 74'; Bennett (yellow card) 90+5'	Report	Bean (yellow card) 43'; Jombati 88'	Stadium: Rodney Parade; Attendance: 2,010; Referee: John Busby

26 November 2016 19	Wycombe Wanderers	2–0	Hartlepool United	High Wycombe
15:00 GMT	Kashket 23', 80'	Report		Stadium: Adams Park; Attendance: 3,288; Referee: James Adcock

10 December 2016 20	Notts County	0–2	Wycombe Wanderers	Nottingham
15:00 GMT	O'Connor (red card) 45+4'; Duffy (yellow card) 48'; Dickinson (yellow card) 57'	Report	Akinfenwa 37' (yellow card) 49' (yellow-red card) 77'; Kashket 55'; Pierre (yellow card) 60'	Stadium: Meadow Lane; Attendance: 3,680; Referee: Eddie Ilderton

17 December 2016 21	Wycombe Wanderers	1–0	Leyton Orient	High Wycombe
15:00 GMT	Kashket 50'; Cowan-Hall (yellow card) 82'	Report	Hunt (yellow card) 76'; McCallum (yellow card) 76'	Stadium: Adams Park; Attendance: 4,517; Referee: Rob Lewis (Alan Young HT) (Note: Rob Lewis was replaced as referee by Alan Young at half time in the match between Wycombe Wanderers and Leyton Orient on 17 December 2016.)

26 December 2016 22	Plymouth Argyle	3–3	Wycombe Wanderers	Plymouth
15:00 GMT	Slew 18'; Jervis 40'; Songo'o 56'; Threlkeld (yellow card) 88'	Report	Kashket 8' (yellow card) 82'; Akinfenwa 59'; Weston 89'; Stewart (yellow card) 90+2'; Jacobson (yellow card) 90+4'	Stadium: Home Park; Attendance: 12,210; Referee: Graham Salisbury

30 December 2016 23	Cheltenham Town	0–1	Wycombe Wanderers	Cheltenham
19:45 GMT	Storer (yellow card) 17'	Report	Kashket 9' (yellow card) 38'; Jacobson (yellow card) 90+5'	Stadium: LCI Rail Stadium; Attendance: 3,761; Referee: Kevin Johnson

2 January 2017 24	Wycombe Wanderers	2–1	Newport County	High Wycombe
15:00 GMT	Thompson (yellow card) 54'; Wood 70'; Cowan-Hall 80'	Report	Randall (yellow card) 44' (goal) 60'; Myrie-Williams (yellow card) 82'; Jones (yellow card) 90+4'	Stadium: Adams Park; Attendance: 4,288; Referee: Lee Collins

7 January 2017	Exeter City	Postponed	Wycombe Wanderers	Exeter
15:00 GMT				Stadium: St James Park

14 January 2017 25	Wycombe Wanderers	1–1	Yeovil Town	High Wycombe
15:00 GMT	Jacobson 26' (pen.); Blackman (yellow card) 62'	Report	Dawson 20' (pen.); Smith (yellow card) 61'	Stadium: Adams Park; Attendance: 3,493; Referee: Robert Jones

21 January 2017 26	Wycombe Wanderers	1–1	Luton Town	High Wycombe
15:00 GMT	Pierre (yellow card) 38'; O'Nien (yellow card) 65'; Stewart (yellow card) 69'; Akinfenwa 82'	Report	Mpanzu (yellow card) 25'; Smith (yellow card) 32'; Hylton (yellow card) 43'; Cuthbert (yellow card) 56'; Mullins (red card) 75'; Gambin (yellow card) 87'	Stadium: Adams Park; Attendance: 5,387; Referee: Mark Heywood

24 January 2017	Exeter City	Postponed	Wycombe Wanderers	Exeter
19:45 GMT				Stadium: St James Park

28 January 2017	Colchester United	Postponed	Wycombe Wanderers	Colchester
15:00 GMT				Stadium: Weston Homes Community Stadium

31 January 2017 27	Exeter City	4–2	Wycombe Wanderers	Exeter
19:45 GMT	Wheeler 19'; Brown 65'; Grant 67'; Watkins 90+5'	Report	Thompson 38'; Bean (yellow card) 60'; Pierre (yellow card) 75'; Jakubiak 89'	Stadium: St James Park; Attendance: 3,656; Referee: John Brooks

4 February 2017 28	Wycombe Wanderers	1–0	Portsmouth	High Wycombe
15:00 GMT	Stewart (yellow card) 11'; Kashket 48' (yellow card) 88'; Wood (yellow card) 66'; Saunders (yellow card) 82'	Report	Stevens (yellow card) 42'	Stadium: Adams Park; Attendance: 6,028; Referee: Graham Salisbury

7 February 2017	Colchester United	Postponed	Wycombe Wanderers	Colchester
19:45 GMT				Stadium: Weston Homes Community Stadium

11 February 2017 29	Stevenage	3–0	Wycombe Wanderers	Stevenage
15:00 GMT	Schumacher 25'; Godden 45+1' (pen.); Pett 49'; McAnuff (yellow card) 73'; Loft (yellow card) 82'	Report	Jacobson (yellow card) 42'	Stadium: Broadhall Way; Attendance: 2,602; Referee: Dean Whitestone

14 February 2017 30	Crewe Alexandra	2–1	Wycombe Wanderers	Crewe
19:45 GMT	Dagnall 11'; Turton (yellow card) 39'; Jones 87' (pen.) (yellow card) 88'	Report	O'Nien (yellow card) 50'; Akinfenwa 75'; Jombati (yellow card) 88'	Stadium: Alexandra Stadium; Attendance: 2,896; Referee: Michael Salisbury

18 February 2017 31	Wycombe Wanderers	1–2	Carlisle United	High Wycombe
15:00 GMT	Akinfenwa 2'; Saunders (yellow card) 76'	Report	Proctor 9'; O'Sullivan (yellow card) 20'; Lambe 34'; Liddle (yellow card) 79'; Jones (yellow card) 82'	Stadium: Adams Park; Attendance: 3,858; Referee: Darren Drysdale

21 February 2017 32	Colchester United	1–0	Wycombe Wanderers	Colchester
19:45 GMT	Elokobi 13'; Lapslie (yellow card) 44'	Report	de Havilland (yellow card) 12'; Jacobson (yellow card) 76' (yellow-red card) 88'	Stadium: Weston Homes Community Stadium; Attendance: 3,031; Referee: Trevor Kettle

25 February 2017 33	Wycombe Wanderers	1–2	Crawley Town	High Wycombe
15:00 GMT	Akinfenwa 15' de Havilland (yellow card) 49'; Cowan-Hall (yellow card) 55'; O'Nien (yellow card) 83'; Müller (yellow card) 90+2'	Report	McNerney 43'; Connolly (yellow card) 69'; Payne 84'	Stadium: Adams Park; Attendance: 3,206; Referee: Gavin Ward

28 February 2017 34	Accrington Stanley	2–2	Wycombe Wanderers	Accrington
19:45 GMT	Clare 45+2'; Pearson 63'	Report	Akinfenwa 56', 58' de Havilland (yellow card) 73'	Stadium: Wham Stadium; Attendance: 1,045; Referee: Mark Brown

4 March 2017 35	Grimsby Town	1–2	Wycombe Wanderers	Cleethorpes
15:00 GMT	Dyson 17' (pen.); Clements (yellow card) 71'	Report	Wood (yellow card) 16'; Cowan-Hall (yellow card) 57' (goal) 71'; Collins 67' (o.g.); Southwell (yellow card) 90+4'	Stadium: Blundell Park; Attendance: 4,668; Referee: Nicholas Kinseley

11 March 2017 36	Wycombe Wanderers	0–0	Blackpool	High Wycombe
15:00 GMT	Bean (yellow card) 68'; O'Nien (yellow card) 82'	Report	Flores (yellow card) 73'; Potts (penalty missed) 87'	Stadium: Adams Park; Attendance: 3,774; Referee: Christopher Sarginson

14 March 2017 37	Wycombe Wanderers	1–1	Plymouth Argyle	High Wycombe
19:45 GMT	Weston 18'; O'Nien (yellow card) 66'; Cowan-Hall (yellow card) 78'; Jacobson (yellow card) 85'	Report	Sarcevic (yellow card) 36'; Blissett 72'; Threlkeld (yellow card) 76'	Stadium: Adams Park; Attendance: 3,538; Referee: Charles Breakspear

18 March 2017 38	Hartlepool United	0–2	Wycombe Wanderers	Hartlepool
15:00 GMT	Harrison (yellow card) 90+3'	Report	Akinfenwa 24'; O'Nien (yellow card) 29'; Cowan-Hall (yellow card) 82' (yellow-red card) 90+2' (goal) 90'	Stadium: Victoria Park; Attendance: 3,356; Referee: David Webb

25 March 2017 39	Wycombe Wanderers	0–1	Notts County	High Wycombe
15:00 GMT	Weston (yellow card) 61'	Report	Ameobi 27'; O'Connor (yellow card) 53'; Dickinson (yellow card) 90+2'	Stadium: Adams Park; Attendance: 4,362; Referee: Ross Joyce

1 April 2017 40	Leyton Orient	0–2	Wycombe Wanderers	Leyton, London
15:00 BST	Parkes (red card) 28'; Semedo (yellow card) 45+2'; Collins (yellow card) 75'	Report	Bloomfield 37'; Weston 38'; O'Nien (yellow card) 45+1'	Stadium: Matchroom Stadium; Attendance: 4,526; Referee: Charles Breakspear

8 April 2017 41	Wycombe Wanderers	3–3	Cheltenham Town	High Wycombe
15:00 BST	Gape (yellow card) 20'; Thompson 21', 43'; Jacobson 81' (pen.); Harriman (yellow card) 82'	Report	Waters 7', 83'; Pell 13'; Wright (yellow card) 35'; Cranston (yellow card) 39' (yellow-red card) 41'; Holman (yellow card) 89'	Stadium: Adams Park; Attendance: 3,596; Referee: Carl Boyeson

14 April 2017 42	Wycombe Wanderers	0–1	Mansfield Town	High Wycombe
15:00 BST	Harriman (yellow card) 87'	Report	Pearce 13'; Rose (yellow card) 26'; Byrom (yellow card) 29'; Benning (yellow card) 59'; MacDonald (yellow card) 74'	Stadium: Adams Park; Attendance: 4,218; Referee: Robert Jones

17 April 2017 43	Barnet	0–2	Wycombe Wanderers	Canons Park, London
15:00 BST	Akinde (yellow card) 32'; Taylor (yellow card) 52'; Campbell-Ryce (yellow card) 63'; Weston (yellow card) 90'; Clough (yellow card) 90+6'	Report	Saunders 21' (yellow card) 90+6'; Jacobson (yellow card) 28' (goal) 90' (pen.); Kashket (yellow card) 62'; Harriman (yellow card) 73'; Jombati (yellow card) 82'	Stadium: The Hive Stadium; Attendance: 2,507; Referee: Gavin Ward

22 April 2017 44	Wycombe Wanderers	2–1	Doncaster Rovers	High Wycombe
15:00 BST	O'Nien 9', 32'; Jacobson (yellow card) 21'; Bloomfield (yellow card) 89'	Report	May 18'; Baudry (yellow card) 34'; Butler (yellow card) 65'; McCullogh (yellow card) 90+8'	Stadium: Adams Park; Attendance: 4,587; Referee: Graham Horwood

29 April 2017 45	Morecambe	1–1	Wycombe Wanderers	Morecambe
15:00 BST	McGowan (yellow card) 62'; Ellison (yellow card) 73' (goal) 81'	Report	Jacobson (yellow card) 49'; Pierre (yellow card) 73'; Akinfenwa 89'	Stadium: Globe Arena; Attendance: 1,742; Referee: Darren Drysdale

6 May 2017 46	Wycombe Wanderers	1–0	Cambridge United	High Wycombe
17:30 BST	Kashket 65'; Bean (yellow card) 69'; Jombati (yellow card) 84'; Cowan-Hall (yellow card) 90+3'	Report	Halliday (yellow card) 13'; Taylor (yellow card) 79'	Stadium: Adams Park; Attendance: 6,313; Referee: Mark Heywood

=== FA Cup ===
5 November 2016 First round	Portsmouth	1–2	Wycombe Wanderers	Portsmouth
15:00 GMT	Close (yellow card) 43'; Evans 47'	Report	Cowan-Hall 27'; O'Nien (yellow card) 70'; Akinfenwa 84'	Stadium: Fratton Park; Attendance: 8,130; Referee: Gavin Ward

3 December 2016 Second round	Chesterfield	0–5	Wycombe Wanderers	Chesterfield
15:00 GMT	Nolan (red card) 64'	Report	Hayes 21'; Kashket 24', 70', 77'; Gape (yellow card) 40'; Akinfenwa (yellow card) 68'; Stewart 74'	Stadium: Proact Stadium; Attendance: 3,685; Referee: Michael Salisbury

7 January 2017 Third round	Wycombe Wanderers	2–1	Stourbridge	High Wycombe
15:00 GMT	Cowan-Hall (yellow card) 34'; Wood 47'; Jacobson (yellow card) 52'; Akinfenwa 83'	Report	Scarr 70'	Stadium: Adams Park; Attendance: 6,312; Referee: Darren England

28 January 2017 Fourth round	Tottenham Hotspur	4–3	Wycombe Wanderers	Tottenham, London
15:00 GMT	Winks (yellow card) 54'; Son 60', 90+7'; Janssen 64' (pen.) (yellow card) 69'; Alli 89'	Report	Hayes 23', 36' (pen.); Jombati (yellow card) 42'; O'Nien (yellow card) 54'; Gape (yellow card) 78'; Jacobson (yellow card) 83'; Thompson 83'; Stewart (yellow card) 90+2'	Stadium: White Hart Lane; Attendance: 31,440; Referee: Roger East

=== EFL Cup ===
9 August 2016 First round	Wycombe Wanderers	0–1	Bristol City	High Wycombe
19:45 BST	McGinn (yellow card) 34'; Wood (yellow card) 47'	Report	Abraham 27'; Williams (yellow card) 31'	Stadium: Adams Park; Attendance: 1,842 (466 from Bristol City); Referee: Lee Collins

=== EFL Trophy ===
Pos	Div	Team	Pld	W	PW	PL	L	GF	GA	GD	Pts	Qualification
1	L1	Coventry City	3	3	0	0	0	11	5	+6	9	Advance to Round 2
2	L2	Wycombe Wanderers	3	2	0	0	1	8	4	+4	6	Advance to Round 2
3	ACA	West Ham United U21	3	0	1	0	2	3	8	−5	2	
4	L1	Northampton Town	3	0	0	1	2	2	7	−5	1	

Source: Sky Sports

30 August 2016 Group stage 1	Northampton Town	0–3	Wycombe Wanderers	Northampton
19:45 BST	Sonupe (yellow card) 89'	Report	Rowe 17'; Hayes 47' de Havilland (yellow card) 58'; Thompson 90+3'	Stadium: Sixfields Stadium; Attendance: 1,408; Referee: Paul Tierney

4 October 2016 Group stage 2	Wycombe Wanderers	3–0	West Ham United U23	High Wycombe
19:45 BST	Akinfenwa 7'; Pierre (yellow card) 28'; Rowe (yellow card) 40'; Kashket 47'; Stewart (yellow card) 51'; Freeman (yellow card) 64' (goal) 68' de Havilland (yellow card) 79'; Jombati (yellow card) 83'	Report	Gordon (yellow card) 21'; Akinola (yellow card) 71'	Stadium: Adams Park; Attendance: 1,060; Referee: Darren Deadman

9 November 2016 Group stage 3	Wycombe Wanderers	2–4	Coventry City	High Wycombe
19:45 GMT	McGinn 32'; Kashket 53'	Report	Haynes 57', 59'; Thomas 63'; Bigirimana 86'; Harries (yellow card) 88'	Stadium: Adams Park; Attendance: 912; Referee: Charles Breakspear

7 December 2016 Second round	Millwall	1–3	Wycombe Wanderers	Bermondsey, London
19:45 GMT	Worrall 53'; Onyedinma (penalty missed) 72'	Report	Akinfenwa 51' (pen.); Pierre (yellow card) 71' de Havilland (yellow card) 82'; Thompson 85', 90+1'	Stadium: The Den; Attendance: 1,619; Referee: Dean Whitestone

10 January 2017 Third round	Blackpool	1–1 (4–5 p)	Wycombe Wanderers	Blackpool
19:00 GMT	Mellor 9'; Philliskirk (penalty missed) 33'	Report	Stewart 77'; O'Nien (yellow card) 84'	Stadium: Bloomfield Road; Attendance: 766; Referee: Eddie Ilderton
	Penalties
	Philliskirk (penalty scored); Cain (penalty scored); Redshaw (penalty scored); Gnanduillet (penalty scored); Aimson (penalty missed)		Jacobson (penalty scored); O'Nien (penalty scored); De Havilland (penalty scored); Akinfenwa (penalty scored); Thompson (penalty scored)

24 January 2017 Quarter-final	Mansfield Town	1–2	Wycombe Wanderers	Mansfield
19:45 GMT	Green 34' (pen.); Thomas (yellow card) 48'	Report	Saunders (yellow card) 45+2'; Kashket 73'; Akinfenwa 81'	Stadium: Field Mill; Attendance: 2,047; Referee: David Webb

7 February 2017 Semi-final	Coventry City	2–1	Wycombe Wanderers	Coventry
19:30 GMT	Beavon 11'; Thomas 19'; Kelly-Evans (yellow card) 78'; Tudgay (yellow card) 90'	Report	Akinfenwa 55'	Stadium: Ricoh Arena; Attendance: 11,672; Referee: Darren England

== Team details ==
=== Squad information ===
No.	Nationality	Name	Age	Joined club (Note: Year that player became a Wycombe first-team player)
GOALKEEPERS
13	(England)	Barry Richardson	57	2014
27	(England)	Jamal Blackman†	33	2016
DEFENDERS
2	(Portugal)	Sido Jombati	39	2014
3	(Wales)	Joe Jacobson	39	2014
5	(England)	Anthony Stewart	34	2015
6	(Grenada)	Aaron Pierre	33	2014
16	(Republic of Ireland)	Michael Harriman	34	2015
21	(Germany)	Max Müller	32	2016
23	(England)	Will de Havilland	32	2016
MIDFIELDERS
8	(Jamaica)	Marcus Bean	42	2014
10	(England)	Matt Bloomfield	42	2003
11	(England)	Sam Wood	40	2012
17	(England)	Luke O'Nien	31	2015
19	(Antigua and Barbuda)	Myles Weston	38	2016
22	(England)	Nick Freeman	31	2016
24	(England)	Scott Kashket	30	2016
25	(England)	Dominic Gape	32	2016
29	(England)	Sam Saunders	43	2017 (Note: Saunders originally joined Wycombe Wanderers in 2015 on loan, but signed permanently on 20 January 2017.)
43	(England)	Gareth Ainsworth	53	2009
FORWARDS
7	(England)	Garry Thompson	45	2015
9	(England)	Paul Hayes (c)	43	2014
12	(England)	Paris Cowan-Hall	36	2015
15	(England)	Dayle Southwell	33	2016
20	(England)	Adebayo Akinfenwa	44	2016
26	(Scotland)	Alex Jakubiak†	30	2017

† Loan player

=== Appearances and goals ===
As of 1 April 2017

No.	Pos	Nat	Player	Total		League Two		FA Cup		EFL Cup		EFL Trophy	
No.	Pos	Nat	Player	Apps	Goals	Apps	Goals	Apps	Goals	Apps	Goals	Apps	Goals
1	GK	(England) ENG	Scott Brown (Note: Scott Brown is currently on loan at Cheltenham Town.)	4	0	3	0	0	0	0	0	1	0
2	DF	(Portugal) POR	Sido Jombati	29	2	20	2	2	0	1	0	6	0
3	DF	(Wales) WAL	Joe Jacobson	42	1	34	1	4	0	1	0	3	0
5	DF	(England) ENG	Anthony Stewart	40	3	30	1	4	1	1	0	5	1
6	DF	(Grenada) GRN	Aaron Pierre	41	2	33	2	4	0	1	0	3	0
7	FW	(England) ENG	Garry Thompson	45	5	36	1	2	1	1	0	6	3
8	MF	(Jamaica) JAM	Marcus Bean	22	0	14	0	2	0	0	0	6	0
9	FW	(England) ENG	Paul Hayes	28	7	20	3	4	3	0	0	4	1
10	MF	(England) ENG	Matt Bloomfield	33	5	28	5	3	0	1	0	1	0
11	MF	(England) ENG	Sam Wood	40	3	31	2	3	1	1	0	5	0
12	FW	(England) ENG	Paris Cowan-Hall	32	5	26	4	3	1	0	0	3	0
13	GK	(England) ENG	Barry Richardson	0	0	0	0	0	0	0	0	0	0
15	FW	(England) ENG	Dayle Southwell	14	1	12	1	0	0	1	0	1	0
16	DF	(Republic of Ireland) IRL	Michael Harriman	40	0	32	0	2	0	1	0	5	0
17	MF	(England) ENG	Luke O'Nien	34	1	26	1	4	0	0	0	4	0
18	DF	(England) ENG	Danny Rowe (Note: Danny Rowe is currently on loan at Barrow.)	15	1	12	0	0	0	0	0	3	1
19	MF	(Antigua and Barbuda) ANT	Myles Weston	23	3	16	3	3	0	0	0	4	0
20	FW	(England) ENG	Adebayo Akinfenwa	46	17	36	11	4	2	1	0	5	4
21	DF	(Germany) GER	Max Müller	12	0	9	0	0	0	0	0	3	0
22	MF	(England) ENG	Nick Freeman	14	1	11	0	0	0	0	0	3	1
23	DF	(England) ENG	Will De Havilland	22	0	15	0	0	0	1	0	6	0
24	MF	(England) ENG	Scott Kashket	24	15	16	9	3	3	0	0	5	3
25	MF	(England) ENG	Dominic Gape	35	1	30	1	4	0	0	0	1	0
26	FW	(Scotland) SCO	Alex Jakubiak	9	1	9	1	0	0	0	0	0	0
27	GK	(England) ENG	Jamal Blackman	46	0	36	0	4	0	0	0	6	0
29	MF	(England) ENG	Sam Saunders	16	0	13	0	1	0	0	0	2	0
43	MF	(England) ENG	Gareth Ainsworth	1	0	0	0	0	0	0	0	1	0
Players who left the club before the end of the season:
24	GK	(England) ENG	Cameron Dawson	2	0	1	0	0	0	1	0	0	0
4	MF	(Scotland) SCO	Stephen McGinn	10	1	5	0	0	0	1	0	4	1

== Transfers ==
=== In ===
Date	Position	Nationality	Name	From	Fee	Ref.
1 July 2016	CF	(England)	Dayle Southwell	Boston United	Undisclosed	
1 July 2016	LW	(Antigua and Barbuda)	Myles Weston	Southend United	Free transfer	
10 July 2016	CF	(England)	Adebayo Akinfenwa	AFC Wimbledon	Free transfer	
22 July 2016	CM	(England)	Nick Freeman	Hemel Hempstead Town	Free transfer	
26 July 2016	GK	(England)	Scott Brown	Aberdeen	Free transfer	
26 July 2016	CB	(England)	Will De Havilland	Sheffield Wednesday	Free transfer	
1 August 2016	CB	(Germany)	Max Müller	Austria Salzburg	Free transfer	
31 August 2016	SS	(England)	Scott Kashket	Leyton Orient	Free transfer	
7 January 2017	DM	(England)	Dominic Gape	Southampton	Free transfer	
20 January 2017	AM	(England)	Sam Saunders	Brentford	Free transfer	
1 February 2017	RW	(England)	Paris Cowan-Hall	Millwall	Free transfer	

=== Out ===
Date	Position	Nationality	Name	To	Fee	Ref.
1 July 2016	CF	(Wales)	Aaron Amadi-Holloway	Fleetwood Town	Undisclosed	
1 July 2016	LM	(England)	Max Kretzschmar	Woking (Note: Following Kretzschmar's release, he signed for Woking on 15 July 2016.)	Released	
1 July 2016	GK	(Wales)	Alex Lynch	Bala Town (Note: Following Lynch's release, he signed for Bala Town on 12 August 2016.)	Released	
1 July 2016	LB	(England)	Ryan Sellers	Wingate & Finchley (Note: Following Sellers' release, he signed for Wingate & Finchley.)	Released	
1 July 2016	CF	(England)	Gozie Ugwu	Woking (Note: Following Ugwu's release, he signed for Woking on 15 July 2016.)	Released	
25 January 2017	CM	(Scotland)	Stephen McGinn	St Mirren (Note: Following McGinn's release, he signed for St Mirren on 27 January 2017.)	Released	

=== Loans in ===
Date	Position	Nationality	Name	From	Date until	Ref.
1 July 2016	RW	(England)	Paris Cowan-Hall	Millwall	31 January 2017 (Note: On 1 February 2017, Paris Cowan-Hall was signed from Millwall on a free transfer after his contract with Millwall was terminated by mutual consent.)	
9 August 2016	GK	(England)	Cameron Dawson	Sheffield Wednesday	16 August 2016	
15 August 2016	GK	(England)	Jamal Blackman	Chelsea	End of season (Note: On 1 January 2017, Jamal Blackman's loan from Chelsea was extended until the end of the season.)	
31 August 2016	DM	(England)	Dominic Gape	Southampton	3 January 2017 (Note: On 7 January 2017, Dominic Gape was signed from Southampton on a free transfer.)	
30 January 2017	FW	(Scotland)	Alex Jakubiak	Watford	End of season	

=== Loans out ===
Date	Position	Nationality	Name	To	Date until	Ref.
21 November 2016	GK	(England)	Scott Brown	Eastleigh	19 December 2016	
2 December 2016	MF	(England)	Nick Freeman	Wealdstone	1 January 2017	
6 January 2017	DF	(England)	Danny Rowe	Barrow	End of season	
9 January 2017	GK	(England)	Scott Brown	Cheltenham Town	End of season	
3 February 2017	FW	(England)	Dayle Southwell	Lincoln City	2 March 2017	
