= Joe Jacobson =

Welsh footballer (born 1986)

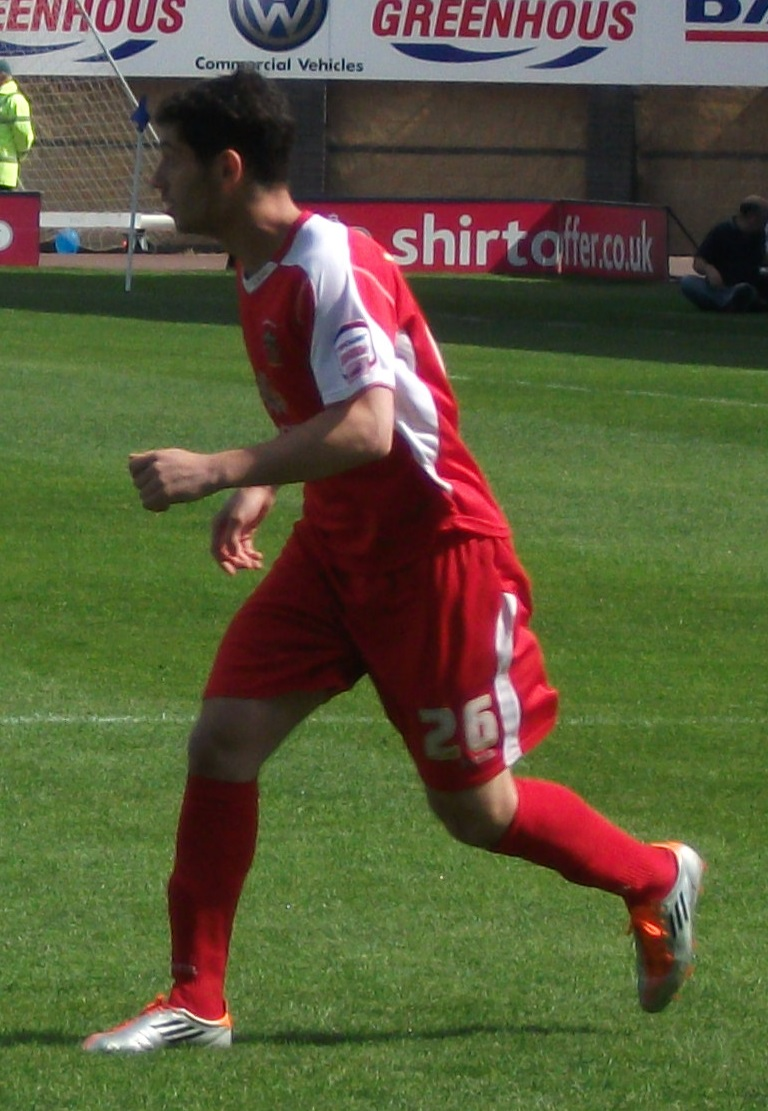
- Jacobson playing for Accrington Stanley in 2011

Personal information
- Full name: Joseph Mark Jacobson
- Date of birth: 17 November 1986 (age 40)
- Place of birth: Cardiff, Wales
- Height: 5 ft 11 in (1.80 m)
- Position: Defender

Youth career
- ?–2005: Cardiff City

Senior career*
Years	Team	Apps	(Gls)
2005–2007	Cardiff City	1	(0)
2006	→ Accrington Stanley (loan )	6	(1)
2007	→ Bristol Rovers (loan)	11	(0)
2007–2009	Bristol Rovers	62	(1)
2009–2011	Oldham Athletic	16	(0)
2010–2011	→ Accrington Stanley (loan)	6	(1)
2011	Accrington Stanley	20	(1)
2011–2014	Shrewsbury Town	110	(7)
2014–2024	Wycombe Wanderers	344	(37)
Total		576	(48)

International career
2005–2008	Wales U21	14	(1)
- * Club domestic league appearances and goals

Joseph Mark Jacobson (born 17 November 1986) is a Welsh former professional footballer who played as a left back and centre back. He is the current co-CEO of Reading.

He is the former captain of the Wales U21 team, and is also a former captain of the Cardiff City reserve team. He was selected in League Two's PFA Team of the Year in 2016 and League One's in 2020.

== Early and personal life ==
Jacobson was born and grew up in Llanishen, Cardiff, Wales, and is Jewish. He has a brother, Sam. His family attends the Cardiff United Synagogue.

In 2024, Jacobson said he had needed a security escort due to antisemitic abuse since the start of the Gaza war.

== Club career ==
=== Cardiff City ===
Jacobson signed professional terms with his hometown club in July 2006. He made his league debut as a substitute for Chris Barker in Cardiff's Championship defeat at home to Norwich City on 22 April 2006. He made his first start on 22 August in Cardiff's surprise defeat at home to League Two side Barnet in the Football League Cup, and was voted Man of The Match by the local press.

In November 2006 the Torquay-based newspaper the Herald Express reported that Jacobson was likely to sign for Torquay United on loan, a story backed up by the team's official website. However, the move fell through when Torquay failed to loan Martin Phillips to Exeter City and Torquay chairman Chris Roberts refused to sanction the deal. He joined Accrington Stanley on loan and started their Football League Two match away at Grimsby on 25 November, followed by a Football League Trophy quarter-final tie away at League One club Doncaster Rovers on the following Tuesday.

=== Bristol Rovers ===
In February 2007, Jacobson joined Bristol Rovers on loan until the end of the season, and then signed on a permanent basis in the summer of 2007.

Jacobson was the subject of controversy after executing a tackle on Kieron Dyer during a second round League Cup match against West Ham United on 28 August 2007. The tackle broke Dyer's tibia and fibula bones in his right leg, rendering him unavailable for both domestic and international selection. West Ham's manager Alan Curbishley, was furious initially accusing Jacobson of conducting himself maliciously, however this was dismissed with a written apology to Jacobson when Curbishley saw the tackle again. Awarded Bristol Rovers Supporters Club Young Player of the Year Award 2007–08. During his spell at Rovers, he was voted Young Player of the Year and helped the team to promotion to League 1 and to the quarter final of the FA Cup, scoring in a penalty shoot out win against Premiership Fulham. In 2008, he won the Maccabi GB Senior Sports Award.

On 8 May 2009, it was announced that Jacobson was to be released by Bristol Rovers at the end of his contract.

=== Oldham Athletic ===
On 18 June 2009, Jacobson signed a two-year contract with Oldham Athletic after passing a medical. Jacobson made his long-awaited debut for Oldham on 24 November 2009, playing 45 minutes as a substitute in a 3–0 defeat to Walsall.

In July 2010 he was transfer-listed by the club, along with five other first team players.

=== Accrington Stanley ===
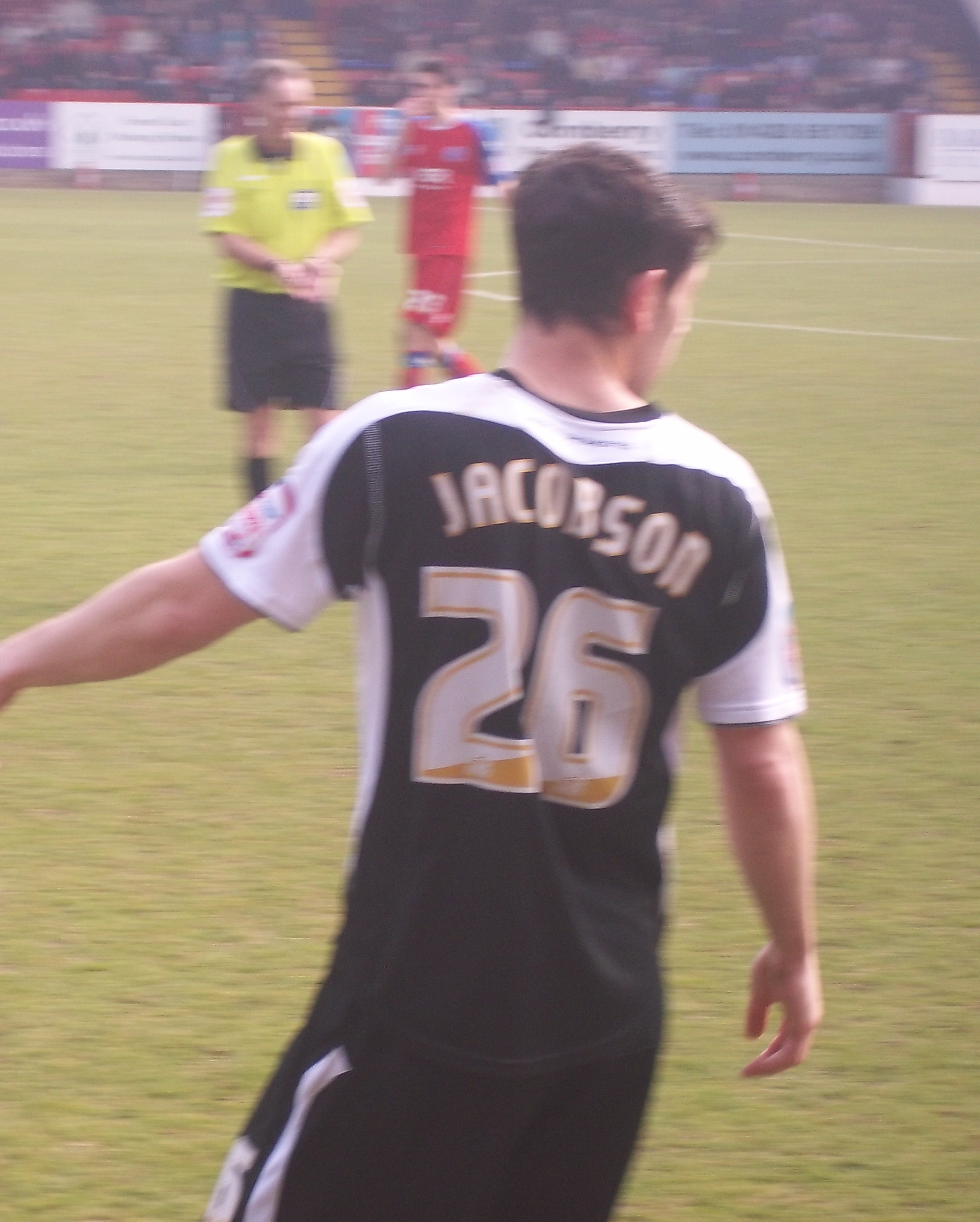
Jacobson playing for Accrington Stanley in 2011

On 23 November, Jacobson joined Accrington Stanley on loan. On 7 January Stanley announced the loan had been extended until 29 January with an option to extend until the end of the season. The following day he scored his first goal for the club as they beat Bury 1–0. On 31 January 2011, he signed for Stanley on a permanent basis, helping them to achieve a playoff place.

=== Shrewsbury Town ===
Following the expiration of his Accrington contract, on 28 June 2011 it was announced that Jacobson would join Shrewsbury Town on a two-year deal. In an interview he told reporters: "it's the place I wanted to be." Joe made his first appearance for Shrewsbury Town in a 2–0 home win against Crewe Alexandra and scored his first goal as a Shrewsbury player in a 7–2 away win against Northampton Town. In the 2011–12 season he made 45 appearances for Shrewsbury Town in all competitions establishing himself as first-choice left-back with manager Graham Turner and securing promotion to League One. In the 2012–13 season, he was selected as captain in the absence of Matt Richards as Shrewsbury confirmed their League One status in a 0–0 draw away at Colchester United on 20 April 2013. He retained this role for the final two matches of the season, also scoring in both, against Oldham Athletic and Portsmouth.

By playing an undisclosed number of matches for Shrewsbury Town, Jacobson triggered a clause in his contract to earn another year, extending his stay to the end of the 2013–14 season. Following Shrewsbury's relegation, Jacobson was released at the end of his contract.

=== Wycombe Wanderers ===
On 1 July 2014, Jacobson signed a two-year contract with Wycombe Wanderers following his release from Shrewsbury Town. In the 2015 League Two play-off final, Jacobson's free kick was deflected into his own net by Southend United's goalkeeper Daniel Bentley to open the scoring. He later scored a penalty in the shootout, but Wycombe lost on penalties. He scored his first career hat-trick with a free kick and two direct corners in a 3–1 win over Lincoln City. In 2016 he was selected in League Two's PFA Team of the Year. In November 2019 he received the League One Player of the Month Award. In the 2020 League One play-off final, Jacobson scored the winning goal from the penalty spot as the club reached the Championship for the first time. In July 2020 Jacobson was in discussions about extending his contract with Wycombe. Jacobson was awarded the 'Players' Player' award in May 2021, voted for by the playing squad. During the 2022 season, Jacobson has been the captain for the Wanderers. Having been defeated 2–0 by Sunderland in the 2022 EFL League One play-off final, Jacobson was offered a new contract at the end of the 2021–22 season. Near the end of the 2023–24 season, it was confirmed that he would leave Wycombe at the end of his contract. He made his 400th and final appearance for Wycombe in a 1–0 victory against Charlton Athletic, retiring soon afterwards.

== International career ==
Jacobson represented Great Britain at the 2001 Maccabiah Games in Israel at the age of 14.

Jacobson captained the Wales Under-21 side that beat France and Romania until narrowly losing over two legs to England U21 in the 2009 European Championship play-offs in October 2008. John Toshack named him in the senior squad for several friendlies but he did not make his debut for the senior team.

== Career statistics ==
As of end of 2023–24 season

Appearances and goals by club, season and competition
Club	Season	League			FA Cup		League Cup		Other		Total	
Club	Season	Division	Apps	Goals	Apps	Goals	Apps	Goals	Apps	Goals	Apps	Goals
Cardiff City	2005–06	Championship	1	0	0	0	0	0	—		1	0
Cardiff City	2006–07	Championship	0	0	0	0	1	0	—		1	0
Cardiff City	Total		1	0	0	0	1	0	0	0	2	0
Accrington Stanley (loan)	2006–07	League Two	6	1	0	0	0	0	1 (Note: Appearances in the Football League Trophy)	0	7	1
Bristol Rovers (loan)	2006–07	League Two	11	0	0	0	0	0	2 (Note: Appearances in the EFL League Two play-offs)	0	13	0
Bristol Rovers	2007–08	League One	40	1	7	0	2	0	0	0	49	1
Bristol Rovers	2008–09	League One	22	0	0	0	0	0	0	0	22	0
Bristol Rovers	Total		62	1	7	0	2	0	0	0	71	1
Oldham Athletic	2009–10	League One	15	0	0	0	0	0	0	0	15	0
Oldham Athletic	2010–11	League One	1	0	0	0	0	0	0	0	1	0
Oldham Athletic	Total		16	0	0	0	0	0	0	0	16	0
Accrington Stanley (loan)	2010–11	League Two	26	2	1	0	0	0	2	0	29	2
Shrewsbury Town	2011–12	League Two	39	1	3	0	2	0	1	0	45	1
Shrewsbury Town	2012–13	League One	30	2	0	0	1	0	0	0	31	2
Shrewsbury Town	2013–14	League One	41	4	0	0	1	0	1	0	43	4
Shrewsbury Town	Total		110	7	3	0	4	0	2	0	119	7
Wycombe Wanderers	2014–15	League Two	42	3	2	0	1	0	4 (Note: One appearance in the Football League Trophy and three in the EFL League Two play-offs)	0	49	3
Wycombe Wanderers	2015–16	League Two	34	1	3	1	1	0	1	0	39	2
Wycombe Wanderers	2016–17	League Two	39	3	4	0	1	0	3 (Note: Appearance(s) in EFL Trophy)	0	47	3
Wycombe Wanderers	2017–18	League Two	46	6	3	0	1	0	1	0	51	6
Wycombe Wanderers	2018–19	League One	36	7	1	0	2	0	1	0	40	7
Wycombe Wanderers	2019–20	League One	30	9	1	1	0	0	5 (Note: Two appearances in EFL Trophy and three appearances and two goals in EFL League One play-offs)	2	36	12
Wycombe Wanderers	2020–21	Championship	37	4	2	1	1	0	0	0	40	5
Wycombe Wanderers	2021–22	League One	40	3	2	1	3	0	4 (Note: One appearance in EFL Trophy and two appearances in League One play-offs)	0	49	4
Wycombe Wanderers	2022–23	League One	34	1	0	0	2	1	2	0	38	2
Wycombe Wanderers	2023–24	League One	6	0	1	0	0	0	4	0	11	0
Wycombe Wanderers	Total		344	37	19	4	12	1	25	2	400	44
Career total			576	48	30	4	19	1	32	2	657	55

== Honours ==
Shrewsbury Town

- Football League Two second-place promotion: 2011–12

Wycombe Wanderers

- EFL League One play-offs: 2020
- EFL League Two promotion: 2017–18

Individual

- PFA Team of the Year: 2015–16 League Two, 2019–20 League One
- Wycombe Wanderers Player of the Season: 2019–20
- PFA Fans' Player of the Year: 2019–20 League One
- Wycombe Wanderers Player's Player of the Season: 2020–21

== See also ==
- List of select Jewish football (association; soccer) players
