= Will de Havilland =

English footballer

Personal information
- Full name: William Lee de Havilland
- Date of birth: 8 November 1994 (age 32)
- Place of birth: Huntingdon, England
- Height: 6 ft 3 in (1.90 m)
- Position: Defender

Team information
- Current team: Hampton & Richmond Borough
- Number: 4

Youth career
- –2013: Millwall

Senior career*
Years	Team	Apps	(Gls)
2013–2014	Millwall	0	(0)
2013–2014	→ Cambridge City (loan)	2	(0)
2014	→ Histon (loan)	4	(0)
2014	→ Histon (loan)	10	(1)
2014	Bishop's Stortford	1	(0)
2014–2016	Sheffield Wednesday	0	(0)
2016–2018	Wycombe Wanderers	19	(0)
2017	→ Aldershot Town (loan)	8	(0)
2018	→ Maidstone United (loan)	10	(0)
2018–2019	Maidstone United	42	(3)
2019–2021	Dover Athletic	42	(5)
2021–2026	Maidenhead United	175	(10)
2026–	Hampton & Richmond Borough	0	(0)
- * Club domestic league appearances and goals as of 05:26, 2 May 2026 (UTC)

William Lee de Havilland (born 8 November 1994) is an English professional footballer who plays as a defender for National League South club Hampton & Richmond Borough.

De Havilland began his career with Millwall, never making a first-team appearance, and spending loan spells with non-league clubs Cambridge City and Histon. After leaving Millwall in 2014 he had a brief spell, also in non-league, with Bishop's Stortford, before returning to league football with Sheffield Wednesday. He left the club after two years, having not made a first-team appearance, and signed for Wycombe Wanderers where he made his professional debut. He spent loan spells at non-league Aldershot Town and Maidstone United. In June 2018 it was announced that he would sign a permanent contract with Maidstone United in July 2018.

== Career ==
De Havilland began his career with Millwall, spending a loan spell with Cambridge City and two loan spells with Histon. After playing for Bishop's Stortford, he signed for Sheffield Wednesday in August 2014. He moved to Wycombe Wanderers in July 2016. He signed on loan for Aldershot Town in July 2017. He signed on loan for Maidstone United in February 2018.

In May 2018 it was announced that he would not be retained by Wycombe following the end of the 2017–18 season. Later that month Maidstone United announced that De Havilland would re-sign for them. Maidstone United were relegated at the end of the 2018–19 season, and de Havilland had a relegation clause in his contract. He signed for Dover Athletic in June 2019. Following's Dover's decision to not play any more matches in the 2020–21 season, made in late January, and subsequent null and voiding of all results, on 5 May 2021 it was announced that de Havilland was out of contract and had left the club.

On 1 July 2021 it was announced that he had joined Maidenhead United. Across five seasons, he scored eleven goals across 193 appearances before leaving at the end of the 2025–26 season.

On 9 June 2026, Hampton & Richmond Borough announced that de Havilland had joined them upon the expiry of his contract with Maidenhead.

== Career statistics ==
As of end of 2025-26 season

Club	Season	League			FA Cup		League Cup		Other		Total	
Club	Season	Division	Apps	Goals	Apps	Goals	Apps	Goals	Apps	Goals	Apps	Goals
Millwall	2013–14	Championship	0	0	0	0	0	0	0	0	0	0
Cambridge City (loan)	2013–14	SFL Premier Division	2	0	0	0	0	0	0	0	2	0
Histon (loan)	2013–14	Conference North	14	1	0	0	0	0	0	0	14	1
Bishop's Stortford	2014–15	Conference South	1	0	0	0	0	0	0	0	1	0
Sheffield Wednesday	2014–15	Championship	0	0	0	0	0	0	0	0	0	0
Sheffield Wednesday	2015–16	Championship	0	0	0	0	0	0	0	0	0	0
Sheffield Wednesday	Total		0	0	0	0	0	0	0	0	0	0
Wycombe Wanderers	2016–17	League Two	16	0	1	0	0	0	6 (Note: Appearance(s) in EFL Trophy)	0	23	0
Wycombe Wanderers	2017–18	League Two	3	0	1	0	0	0	2	1	6	1
Wycombe Wanderers	Total		19	0	2	0	0	0	8	1	29	1
Aldershot Town (loan)	2017–18	National League	8	0	0	0	0	0	0	0	8	0
Maidstone United (loan)	2017–18	National League	10	0	0	0	0	0	0	0	10	0
Maidstone United	2018–19	National League	42	3	3	0	0	0	6 (Note: Appearance(s) in FA Trophy)	2	51	5
Dover Athletic	2019–20	National League	29	3	2	0	—		1	0	32	3
Dover Athletic	2020–21	National League	13	2	0	0	—		1	0	14	2
Dover Athletic	Total		42	5	2	0	0	0	2	0	46	5
Maidenhead United	2021–22	National League	27	1	1	0	—		0	0	28	1
Maidenhead United	2022–23	National League	34	2	2	1	—		3	0	39	3
Maidenhead United	2023–24	National League	37	1	2	0	—		1	0	40	1
Maidenhead United	2024–25	National League	38	2	3	0	—		4 (Note: One appearance in FA Trophy, three appearances in National League Cup)	0	45	2
Maidenhead United	2025–26	National League South	39	4	0	0	—		2 (Note: One appearance in FA Trophy, one appearance in National League South playoffs)	0	41	4
Maidenhead United	Total		175	10	8	1	0	0	10	0	193	11
Career total			313	19	15	1	0	0	26	3	354	23

== Playing style ==
De Havilland, a defender, bases his playing style on John Terry and Gary Cahill.
