= Jamal Blackman =

English footballer (born 1993)

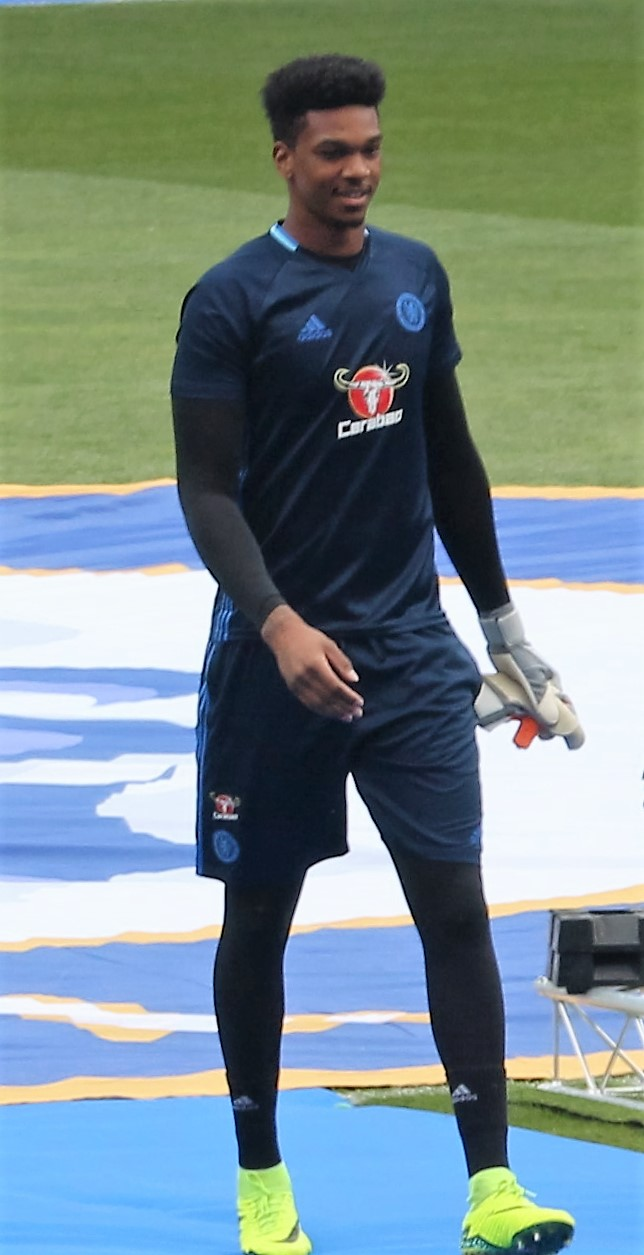
- Blackman with Chelsea in 2016

Personal information
- Full name: Jamal Clint-Ross Blackman
- Date of birth: 27 October 1993 (age 33)
- Place of birth: Croydon, England
- Height: 6 ft 6 in (1.99 m)
- Position: Goalkeeper

Youth career
- 2006–2012: Chelsea

Senior career*
Years	Team	Apps	(Gls)
2012–2021	Chelsea	0	(0)
2014–2015	→ Middlesbrough (loan)	0	(0)
2016	→ Östersund (loan)	12	(0)
2016–2017	→ Wycombe Wanderers (loan)	42	(0)
2017–2018	→ Sheffield United (loan)	31	(0)
2018	→ Leeds United (loan)	0	(0)
2019–2020	→ Vitesse (loan)	0	(0)
2020	→ Bristol Rovers (loan)	10	(0)
2020–2021	→ Rotherham United (loan)	26	(0)
2021	Los Angeles FC	8	(0)
2022	Huddersfield Town	1	(0)
2022–2023	Exeter City	38	(0)
2023–2024	Burton Albion	4	(0)
2024–2025	Shrewsbury Town	27	(0)
2025–2026	Morecambe	28	(0)

International career^{‡}
2008–2009	England U16	2	(0)
2009	England U17	2	(0)
2011	England U19	3	(0)
2026–	Barbados	4	(0)
- * Club domestic league appearances and goals as of 17:30, 11 April 2026 (UTC) ‡ National team caps and goals as of 23:06, 9 October 2026 (UTC)

Jamal Clint-Ross Blackman (born 23 October 1993) is a professional footballer who plays as a goalkeeper. Born in England, he represents the Barbados national team.

A product of the Chelsea academy, he represented England up to under-19 level and won the Victory Shield with the under-16s in 2009. He progressed through the Chelsea academy as a youth and turned professional after winning the FA Youth Cup in 2012. However he never played a first-team game for the club, and instead was sent on several loan spells to Middlesbrough, Östersund (Sweden), Wycombe Wanderers, Sheffield United, Leeds United, Vitesse (Netherlands), Bristol Rovers and Rotherham United, before being released at the end of his contract in June 2021. After one season with Major League Soccer club Los Angeles FC, he returned to England and played for Huddersfield Town, Exeter City, Burton Albion and Shrewsbury Town.

== Club career ==
=== Chelsea ===
Blackman joined Chelsea at under-13 level and progressed through the club's youth system. He was named by manager André Villas-Boas in a senior match day squad on 29 October 2011, when he sat on the bench for a Premier League match against Arsenal at Stamford Bridge. He began to train regularly with the first-team squad in the 2011–12 season and was an ever-present as the under-18's won that season's FA Youth Cup with a 4–1 aggregate victory over Blackburn Rovers. Blackman signed a new five-year contract with the club in June 2014 and extended that contract by two years in July 2017. He left Chelsea at the expiry of his contract in June 2021, having never played a first-team match during his seven years as a senior professional.

==== Loan to Middlesbrough ====
On 31 August 2014, Blackman joined Championship club Middlesbrough on loan until January 2015. Manager Aitor Karanka said that Blackman would compete with Dimitrios Konstantopoulos and Tomás Mejías for a first-team place. He made his full debut on 23 September against Liverpool in the third round of the League Cup as Boro drew 2–2 after 120 minutes but lost 14–13 in the resulting penalty shoot-out; his save from Raheem Sterling's shot forced the shoot-out to sudden death, in which Blackman scored his penalty kick against opposition goalkeeper Simon Mignolet. He did not feature again for the club and on 6 January 2015, following Mark Schwarzer's departure to Leicester City, Blackman was recalled from the Riverside Stadium by Chelsea to work as the third goalkeeper with the first-team squad behind Thibaut Courtois and Petr Čech.

==== Loan to Östersunds FK ====
On 18 March 2016, Blackman joined Swedish side Östersund on loan until 31 May. On 4 April, he made his Allsvenskan debut in a 1–1 away draw against Hammarby IF, playing the full 90 minutes. He made twelve appearances, keeping three clean sheets, during his ten weeks at the Jämtkraft Arena as Graham Potter's Östersund finished in eighth-place.

==== Loan to Wycombe Wanderers ====
On 15 August 2016, Blackman joined League Two side Wycombe Wanderers on loan until 3 January 2017. The following day, he made his debut against Accrington Stanley in a 1–1 draw at Adams Park. On 20 August, Blackman kept his first clean-sheet for Wycombe in 0–0 draw at Blackpool. He then conceded ten goals in the following three league games. On 1 January, it was announced that Blackman's loan spell had been extended until the end of the 2016–17 season. He made 52 appearances in all competitions for Wycombe as the club narrowly missed out on the play-off positions by just one point, finishing ninth. He was named as the club's Young Player of the Year and manager Gareth Ainsworth predicted that he would go on to play at the highest level.

==== Loan to Sheffield United ====
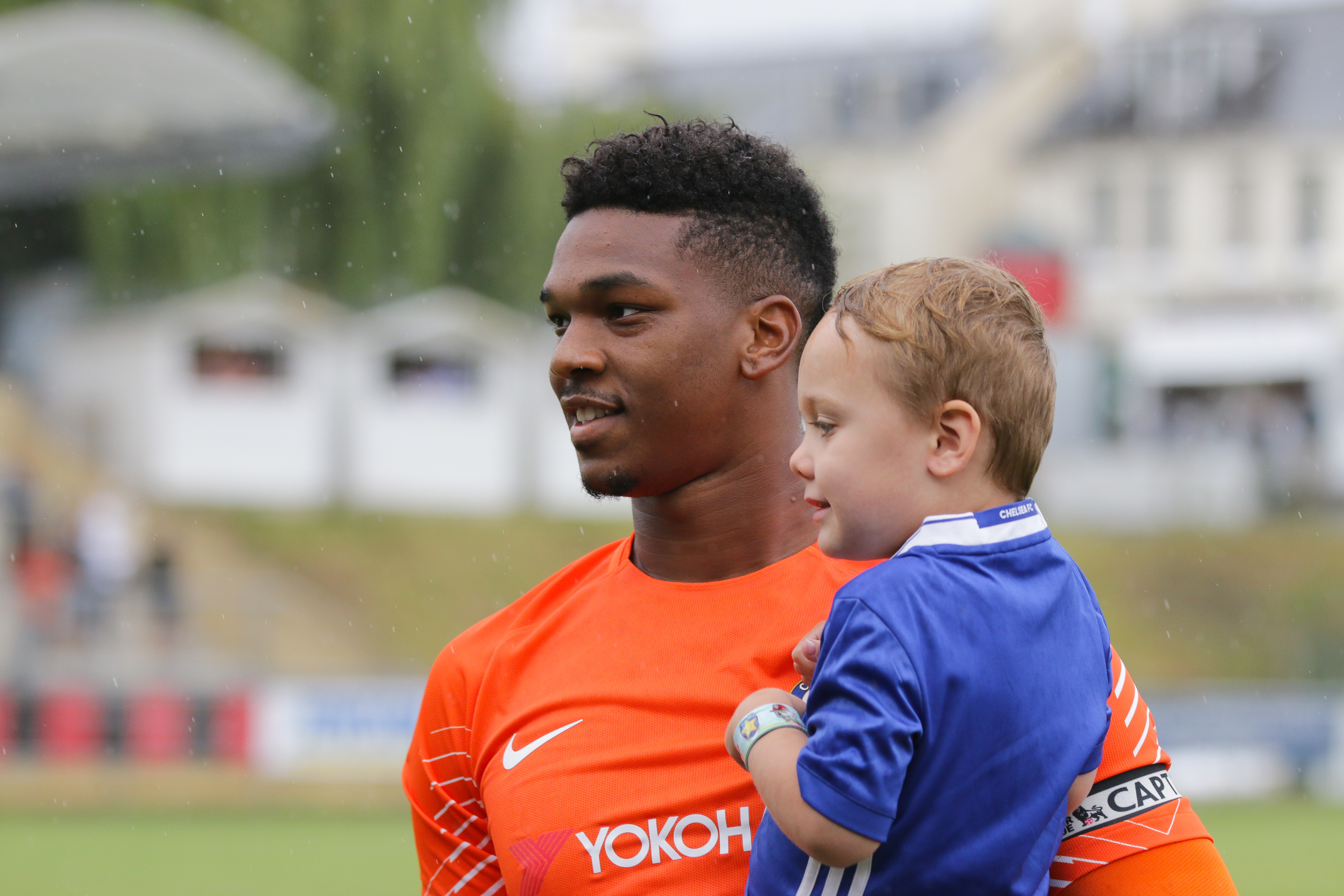
Blackman with Chelsea in 2017

On 27 July 2017, Blackman joined Championship side Sheffield United on a season-long loan. He was originally signed as second-choice for number one goalkeeper Simon Moore, however after an injury to Moore in pre-season, Blackman established himself as first-choice goalkeeper. He made his debut on 5 August as the season began with a 1–0 win over Brentford at Bramall Lane. However he was stretchered off after he picked an injury following a collision with team-mate Cameron Carter-Vickers during a 1–0 defeat at Queens Park Rangers on 31 October. He returned to the starting line-up on 17 November, in a 3–1 win over Burton Albion. Blackman lost his place in the side to Moore after picking up a groin injury in December, but returned in a 2–1 win over Yorkshire rivals Leeds United on 10 February, pulling off a vital save from Pontus Jansson. On 17 March, Blackman received the man of the match award after a string of saves in a 0–0 draw with Nottingham Forest. On 30 March, in a 1–1 draw at Brentford, he and opponent Ryan Woods were sent off for fighting over the ball after the hosts equalised. With Blackman only being at the club on loan, manager Chris Wilder decided to play Moore in goal for the final five games of the season. Blackman played 33 times in all competitions throughout the 2017–18 season, and United were believed to have been interested in a deal to bring him back for the following campaign.

==== Loan to Leeds United ====
On 16 July 2018, Blackman joined Championship side Leeds United on a season-long loan to compete with Bailey Peacock-Farrell for the starting goalkeeper position. He said that he was excited to work with manager Marcelo Bielsa. On 14 August, Blackman made his debut at Elland Road, starting in a 2–1 win over Bolton Wanderers in the EFL Cup. On 16 November, he suffered a broken tibia in his leg in a 3–0 defeat in an under-23 match against Birmingham City. Due to the severity of the injury, he returned to Chelsea, leaving Leeds with just one senior goalkeeper in Peacock-Farrell.

==== Loan to Vitesse ====
On 3 September 2019, Blackman joined Eredivisie side Vitesse on a season-long loan. He reportedly was affected by injury and returned to Chelsea halfway through the 2019–20 campaign without having played a first-team game at the GelreDome.

==== Loan to Bristol Rovers ====
Blackman signed for League One club Bristol Rovers on a six-month loan deal on 22 January 2020; regular custodian Anssi Jaakkola was out injured with a shoulder injury, leaving Jordi van Stappershoef and Alexis André Jr. as the only fit goalkeepers at the club. He made his debut at the Memorial Stadium three days later, in a 0–0 draw with Fleetwood Town. He featured ten times in the second half of the 2019–20 season as Ben Garner's side posted a 14th-place finish.

==== Loan to Rotherham United ====
On 24 August 2020, Blackman joined Championship club Rotherham United on a season-long loan. On 5 September, he made his club debut in a 1–1 draw with Salford City in the first round of the EFL Cup. He played 28 games during the 2020–21 relegation campaign as manager Paul Warne rotated between Blackman and Viktor Johansson at the New York Stadium.

=== Los Angeles FC ===
On 13 September 2021, Blackman joined Major League Soccer side Los Angeles FC. He made his debut for the club on 29 September, playing the full match in a 2–1 loss to Portland Timbers. On 26 October, Blackman had his first clean sheet with LAFC during the club's 3–0 win over Seattle Sounders FC and was named man of the match by fans. He played the final eight games of the 2021 season, before departing the Banc of California Stadium along with head coach Bob Bradley.

=== Later career ===
Blackman returned to England and joined Championship side Huddersfield Town on 31 January 2022 on a deal until the end of the 2021–22 season. He played three games during his time at Kirklees Stadium, and was an unused substitute at Wembley Stadium in the play-off final defeat to Nottingham Forest, and was not retained beyond the summer by manager Carlos Corberán.

Blackman signed for newly promoted League One side Exeter City on 26 July 2022 on a one-year deal. On 3 July 2023, his contract with Exeter having expired, Blackman signed for Burton Albion. On 21 December 2024, Blackman joined League One side Shrewsbury Town on a short-term deal following a short trial period.

On 10 October 2025, Blackman joined National League side Morecambe on a deal until January. On 16 May 2026, Morecambe announced he was being released.

== International career ==
Blackman has represented England at under-16, under-17 and under-19 level, and won the Victory Shield with the under-16's in 2009. He was called up to the under-21 team in August 2014.

Whilst he has represented England at youth level, Blackman is still eligible to represent Jamaica or Barbados internationally.

On 25 September 2026, Blackman made his debut for the Barbados national team in a 2026–27 CONCACAF Nations League B game against Saint Lucia.

== Personal life ==
Blackman runs his own line of clothing, named Prodigieux.

== Career statistics ==
As of match played 25 January 2025

Appearances and goals by club, season and competition
Club	Season	League			National cup (Note: Includes FA Cup)		League cup (Note: Includes EFL Cup)		Other		Total	
Club	Season	Division	Apps	Goals	Apps	Goals	Apps	Goals	Apps	Goals	Apps	Goals
Chelsea	2014–15	Premier League	0	0	0	0	0	0	—		0	0
Chelsea	2015–16	Premier League	0	0	0	0	0	0	0	0	0	0
Chelsea	Total		0	0	0	0	0	0	0	0	0	0
Middlesbrough (loan)	2014–15	Championship	0	0	0	0	1	0	—		1	0
Östersund (loan)	2016	Allsvenskan	12	0	—		0	0	0	0	12	0
Wycombe Wanderers (loan)	2016–17	League Two	42	0	4	0	0	0	6 (Note: Appearances in EFL Trophy)	0	52	0
Sheffield United (loan)	2017–18	Championship	31	0	2	0	0	0	—		33	0
Leeds United (loan)	2018–19	Championship	0	0	0	0	2	0	—		2	0
Vitesse (loan)	2019–20	Eredivisie	0	0	0	0	—		—		0	0
Bristol Rovers (loan)	2019–20	League One	10	0	—		—		—		10	0
Rotherham United (loan)	2020–21	Championship	26	0	1	0	1	0	—		28	0
Los Angeles FC	2021	Major League Soccer	8	0	—		—		—		8	0
Huddersfield Town	2021–22	Championship	1	0	2	0	0	0	0	0	3	0
Exeter City	2022–23	League One	38	0	2	0	0	0	1	0	41	0
Burton Albion	2023–24	League One	4	0	0	0	1	0	3	0	8	0
Shrewsbury Town	2024–25	League One	7	0	0	0	0	0	0	0	7	0
Career total			179	0	11	0	5	0	10	0	205	0

== Honours ==
Chelsea Youth

- FA Youth Cup: 2011–12
- Professional U21 Development League: 2013-14

England U16

- Victory Shield: 2009

Individual

- Wycombe Wanderers Young Player of the Year Award: 2016–17
