= Dominic Gape =

English footballer (born 1994)

Personal information
- Full name: Dominic Edward Gape
- Date of birth: 9 September 1994 (age 32)
- Place of birth: Burton Bradstock, England
- Height: 1.80 m (5 ft 11 in)
- Position: Central midfielder

Team information
- Current team: Colchester United
- Number: 15

Youth career
- 2003–2014: Southampton

Senior career*
Years	Team	Apps	(Gls)
2014–2017	Southampton	1	(0)
2016–2017	→ Wycombe Wanderers (loan)	18	(1)
2017–2023	Wycombe Wanderers	159	(3)
2023–2024	Sutton United	4	(0)
2024	Northampton Town	2	(0)
2024–2025	Eastleigh	10	(0)
2025	Shrewsbury Town	16	(0)
2025–	Colchester United	10	(0)
- * Club domestic league appearances and goals as of 08:53, 19 May 2026 (UTC)

Dominic Edward Gape (born 9 September 1994) is an English professional footballer who plays as a central midfielder for EFL League Two club Colchester United.

== Career ==
Born in Burton Bradstock, West Dorset, Gape joined Southampton when he was eight years old, first their academy before being promoted to the Development Squad. He captained the under-18 side in 2012–13.

Gape became part of the first-team squad in 2012, as an unused substitute in a League Cup match against Sheffield Wednesday on 25 September 2012. He signed his first professional contract in May 2013. His progress was then impeded by a series of illnesses and injuries, firstly by an ankle ligament injury and then a bout of glandular fever at the end of the 2013–14 season, before he broke a metatarsal in the summer of 2014.

He made his only Premier League appearance on 20 December 2014, as an 89th-minute substitute for Shane Long in a 3–0 victory over Everton.

On 31 August 2016, Gape moved on loan for the first time in his career; signing with League Two side Wycombe Wanderers until 3 January 2017. He scored his first goal for Wycombe in a 5–1 win over Crewe Alexandra on 27 September 2016.

On 7 January 2017, Gape permanently joined Wycombe Wanderers on a 2 1/2-year deal. He scored the winning goal in a 2–1 victory over Chesterfield on 28 April 2018, as Wycombe sealed automatic promotion to League One for the 2018–19 season.

In May 2019, he was offered a new contract by Wycombe. He departed the club at the end of the 2022–23 season.

On 19 October 2023, Gape signed for League Two club Sutton United. He departed the club upon the expiration of his short-term deal in January 2024.

In February 2024, Gape joined League One club Northampton Town on a deal until the end of the season. Following the expiration of his short-term deal, he departed the club on a free transfer.

In October 2024, Gape joined National League club Eastleigh on a short-term deal.

On 20 January 2025, Gape joined League One club Shrewsbury Town on a short-term deal until the end of the season, reuniting with former Wycombe Wanderers manager Gareth Ainsworth. On 7 May 2025, Shrewsbury announced the player would be leaving the club in June when his contract expired.

On 27 June 2025, Colchester announced they had signed the player. On 16 May 2026 the club announced he was being released.

== Career statistics ==
As of match played 31 January 2026

Appearances and goals by club, season and competition
Club	Season	League			FA Cup		League Cup		Other		Total	
Club	Season	Division	Apps	Goals	Apps	Goals	Apps	Goals	Apps	Goals	Apps	Goals
Southampton	2014–15	Premier League	1	0	0	0	0	0	—		1	0
Southampton	2015–16	Premier League	0	0	0	0	0	0	0	0	0	0
Southampton	2016–17	Premier League	0	0	0	0	0	0	0	0	0	0
Southampton	Total		1	0	0	0	0	0	0	0	1	0
Southampton U23	2016–17	—			—		—		1 (Note: Appearance(s) in EFL Trophy)	0	1	0
Wycombe Wanderers (loan)	2016–17	League Two	18	1	2	0	0	0	0	0	20	1
Wycombe Wanderers	2016–17	League Two	14	0	2	0	0	0	0	0	16	0
Wycombe Wanderers	2017–18	League Two	35	1	1	0	0	0	2	0	38	1
Wycombe Wanderers	2018–19	League One	43	1	1	0	2	0	1	0	47	1
Wycombe Wanderers	2019–20	League One	28	0	2	0	1	0	4 (Note: One appearance in EFL Trophy, three in EFL League One play-offs)	0	35	0
Wycombe Wanderers	2020–21	Championship	14	0	1	0	1	0	0	0	16	0
Wycombe Wanderers	2021–22	League One	10	0	1	0	1	0	4	0	16	0
Wycombe Wanderers	2022–23	League One	15	1	0	0	1	0	0	0	16	1
Wycombe Wanderers	Total		177	4	10	0	6	0	11	0	204	4
Sutton United	2023–24	League Two	4	0	2	0	0	0	1	0	7	0
Northampton Town	2023–24	League One	2	0	0	0	0	0	0	0	2	0
Eastleigh	2024–25	National League	10	0	0	0	—		0	0	10	0
Shrewsbury Town	2024–25	League One	16	0	0	0	0	0	0	0	16	0
Colchester United	2025–26	League Two	10	0	0	0	0	0	2	0	12	0
Career total			220	4	12	0	6	0	15	0	253	4

== Honours ==
Southampton

- U21 Premier League Cup: 2014–15

Wycombe Wanderers

- EFL League One play-offs: 2020
