= Jack Cook (footballer) =

English footballer

Personal information
- Full name: John Cook
- Date of birth: 27 July 1887
- Place of birth: Sunderland, England
- Date of death: 1952 (aged 64–65)
- Position: Inside forward

Senior career*
Years	Team	Apps	(Gls)
1910–1911	South Bank		
1911–1912	Seaham Harbour		
1911–1915	Middlesbrough	52	(3)
1919–1924	Notts County	98	(13)
1924–1925	Northampton Town	20	(2)
1925	Sneinton Thursday		
Total		170	(18)
- * Club domestic league appearances and goals

John Cook (27 July 1887–1952) was an English footballer who played in the Football League for Middlesbrough, Northampton Town and Notts County.
