= 2015 Football League Two play-off final =

- The match took place at Wembley Stadium.
- Event: 2014–15 Football League Two
Wycombe Wanderers	Southend United
1	1
- Southend won 7–6 on penalties
- Date: 23 May 2015
- Venue: Wembley Stadium, London
- Man of the Match: Dan Bentley
- Referee: Simon Hooper
- Attendance: 38,252

The 2015 Football League Two play-off final was an association football match played on 23 May 2015 at Wembley Stadium, London, between Wycombe Wanderers and Southend United. The match determined the fourth and final team to gain promotion from Football League Two, English football's fourth tier, to Football League One. The top three teams of the 2014–15 Football League Two season gained automatic promotion to League One, while the teams placed from fourth to seventh in the table took part in play-off semi-finals; the winners of these semi-finals competed for the final place for the 2015–16 season in League One. Wycombe finished in fourth place while Southend ended the season in fifth position. Stevenage and Plymouth Argyle were the losing semi-finalists.

The final was played in front of 38,252 spectators and was refereed by Simon Hooper. After a goalless 90 minutes, the match went into extra time and in the 95th minute, a Joe Jacobson free kick passed over the wall, off the underside of the Southend crossbar and into the goal to make it 1–0 to Wycombe. Two minutes into injury time, Myles Weston's cross was partially cleared but Joe Pigott brought the ball under control inside the Wycombe box, and struck a shot from 15 yards (14 m) into the bottom corner of Alex Lynch's goal to send the game into a penalty shootout. Ben Coker and Matt Bloomfield missed their spot kicks to send the shootout into sudden death where Sam Wood's shot was saved to give the victory to Southend 7–6.

Wycombe ended their following season in thirteenth place in League Two while Southend's next season saw them finish in fifteenth position in the League One table.

== Route to the final ==
EFL League Two final table, leading positions
Pos	Team	Pld	W	D	L	GF	GA	GD	Pts
1	Burton Albion	46	28	10	8	69	39	+30	94
2	Shrewsbury Town	46	27	8	11	67	31	+36	89
3	Bury	46	26	7	13	60	40	+20	85
4	Wycombe Wanderers	46	23	15	8	67	45	+22	84
5	Southend United	46	24	12	10	54	38	+16	84
6	Stevenage	46	20	12	14	62	54	+8	72
7	Plymouth Argyle	46	20	11	15	55	37	+18	71

Wycombe Wanderers finished the regular 2014–15 season in fourth place in Football League Two, the fourth tier of the English football league system, one place ahead of Southend United. Both therefore missed out on the three automatic places for promotion to Football League One and instead took part in the play-offs to determine the fourth promoted team. Wycombe finished one point behind Bury (who were promoted in third place), five behind Shrewsbury Town (promoted in second) and ten behind league winners Burton Albion. Southend ended the season one place behind Wycombe on the same number of points but separated by goal difference.

Southend's opposition in their play-off semi-final was Stevenage with the first match of the two-legged tie taking place at Broadhall Way in Stevenage on 10 May 2015. The first half ended goalless and saw Southend's Michael Timlin receive 15 stitches in a head wound after a clash with Bira Dembélé, and both were substituted. Six minutes into the second half, the home side took lead after a 25-yard (23 m) curling strike from Dean Parrett beat Dan Bentley in the Southend goal. Nine minutes later, Barry Corr equalised with a header which took a deflection off the Stevenage defender Andy Bond before crossing the goal-line, and the match ended 1–1. The second leg of the semi-final was played four days later at Roots Hall in Southend-on-Sea. The first half ended 0–0 before Tom Pett put the visitors into the lead early in the second half from around 6 yards (5.5 m). Ryan Leonard equalised midway through the half and the game went into extra time with the aggregate score at 2–2. Stephen McLaughlin headed Southend into the lead in the second half of extra time before Timlin's stoppage time goal made it 3–1 and 4–2 on aggregate.

In the other play-off semi final, Wycombe faced Plymouth Argyle with the first leg being hosted at Home Park in Plymouth on 9 May 2015. Paul Hayes opened the scoring for the visitors on ten minutes and Aaron Holloway doubled the lead twelves minutes later to make it 2–0 at half-time. Soon after the break, Wycombe's Steven Craig scored from a quick free kick. With four minutes of the match remaining, Zak Ansah's shot from 30 yards (27 m) reduced the deficit and minutes later Jason Banton scored Plymouth's second to end the game 3–2 to Wycombe. The second leg of the semi-final was held five days later at Adams Park in High Wycombe. Another early goal from Hayes put the home side ahead and a header from Alfie Mawson meant the home side held a 2–0 lead at half-time. Ryan Brunt scored for Plymouth midway through the second half but the game ended 2–1 to Wycombe, and the 5–3 aggregate victory saw them qualify for the final.

== Match ==
=== Background ===
Southend United had featured in one play-off final in their history, winning the 2005 Football League Two play-off final 2–0 against Lincoln City at the Millennium Stadium. They had also been knocked out in the semi-finals of the 2012 and 2014 fourth tier play-offs, and the 2008 third tier play-offs. Southend had played in the fourth tier of English football since being relegated from League One in the 2009–10 season. Wycombe won the 1994 Football League Third Division play-off final 4–2 against Preston North End at the old Wembley Stadium and had been knocked out at the semi-final stage of both the 2006 and 2008 fourth tier play-offs. They had been relegated to the fourth tier in the 2011–12 season and narrowly avoided further relegation to the Football League Conference in the 2013–14 season, avoiding becoming a non-League club on goal difference. The top scorer for Southend during the regular season was Corr who had scored 15 goals (14 in the league, 1 in the FA Cup), while Hayes led the scoring chart for Wycombe with 13 goals (12 in the league, 1 in the FA Cup). In the two games between the sides during the regular season, Wycombe won the match at Adams Park 4–1 in December 2014 while the return fixture the following March ended in a 2–2 draw.

Simon Hooper was the referee for the match and was assisted by Jonathan Hunt and Billy Smallwood. Graham Scott was the fourth official while Martin Coy was the reserve assistant referee. Wycombe wore their regular blue checked kit while Southend played in yellow. Southend fans were seated in the West End of Wembley, while Wycombe's supporters were allocated the East End. The match was broadcast live in the UK on Sky Sports.

=== Summary ===
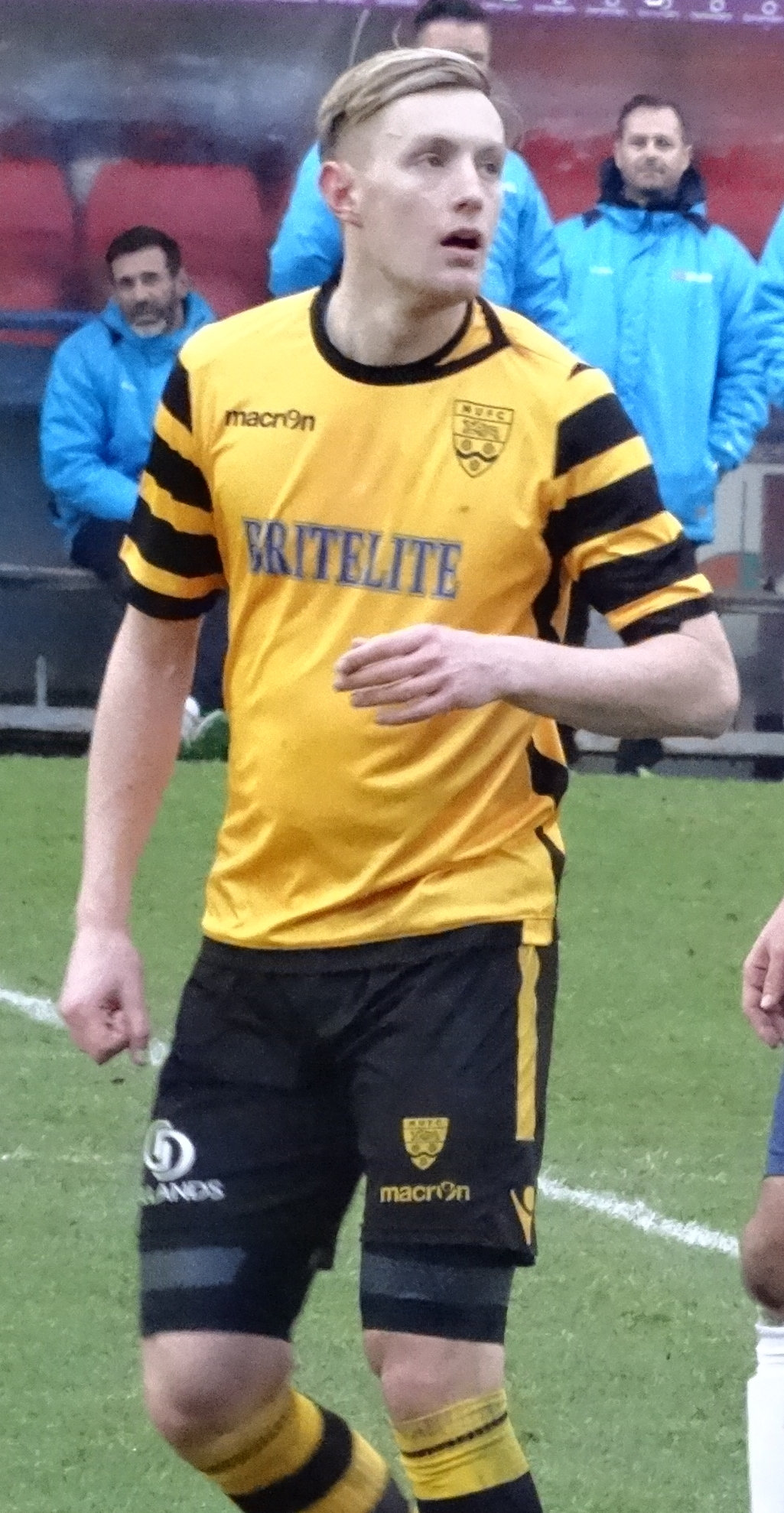
Joe Pigott (pictured in 2017) scored two minutes into stoppage time in extra time to send the game to a penalty shootout.

Wycombe kicked off the match on 23 May 2015 at around 5:30 p.m. in front of a crowd of 38,252. Within two seconds, Wycombe's Sam Saunders went down with a calf injury and had to be replaced in the fourth minute by Matt Bloomfield. After a series of corners for Southend with a chance in the 17th minute falling to Cian Bolger whose header ahead of Mawson's tackle went wide of the Wycombe goal. Four minutes later, Bolger's shot went off-target and soon after Hayes was the first player of the match to be shown the yellow card after he fouled McLaughlin. On 24 minutes, Corr's header found the back of the Wycombe net but was disallowed after a Bolger foul on Nico Yennaris. On the half-hour mark, Bolger was shown the second yellow card of the game after he fouled Sam Wood. Five minutes before half-time, Hayes had a chance from a Hogan Ephraim cross but it was straight at Bentley. Wood then struck a shot high over the Southend crossbar from 25 yards (23 m). The referee blew the whistle for half-time with the score at 0–0.

No changes of personnel were made to either side during the half-time interval and Southend kicked off the second half. On 50 minutes, Will Atkinson's volley for Southend from inside the area was off-target before Ephraim was fouled by Corr: the resulting free kick was struck over the bar by Wycombe's Joe Jacobson. In the 60th minute, Southend made their first substitution of the game with Joe Pigott coming on to replace McLaughlin. Four minutes later, a cross from David Worrall found Corr but his header was gathered by Alex Lynch in the Wycombe goal. Adam Barrett then headed two separate chances off-target for Wycombe and in the 76th minute, Hayes' shot was saved by Bentley before an attempt from Wood was defended by Southend. Pigott's shot was then blocked by Aaron Pierre and two minutes later, another strike from Pigott, this time from 25 yards (23 m), went wide. On 80 minutes, Myles Weston came on to replace Atkinson for Southend and six minutes later, Craig came on for Ephraim for Wycombe. With two minutes of regular time remaining, Pierre's header was tipped over by Bentley. Mawson was then booked for a foul on Pigott before the final whistle was blown and the game moved into extra time.

Wycombe kicked off the first period of extra time. Hayes early strike was wide and then his header went over the Southend bar. In the 95th minute, Holloway was brought down by Timlin 25 yards (23 m) out from the Southend goal and was awarded a free kick. Jacobsen took the set piece and his strike passed over the wall, off the underside of the Southend crossbar and into the goal to make it 1–0 to Wycombe. Almost immediately, Jack Payne was brought on to replace Worrall. Wycombe controlled the remainder of the half and continued their domination into the second half of extra time. In the 111th minute, Wycombe's Yennaris was replaced by Peter Murphy. Leonard was booked four minutes later. Two minutes into injury time, Weston's cross was partially cleared but Pigott brought the ball under control inside the Wycombe box, and struck a shot from 15 yards (14 m) into the bottom corner of Lynch's goal to send the game into a penalty shootout.

The spot kicks were taken at the Wycombe end of Wembley. Pigott and Murphy both scored to make it 1–1 before Ben Coker's strike was saved by Lynch with his legs. Penalties from Mawson, Leonard, Hayes and Payne then found their target before Bloomfield's shot was saved by Bentley to his right. Timlin and Marcus Bean scored their penalties to make it 4–4 and send the shootout to sudden death. Barrett, Jacobsen, Weston, Holloway and Bolger were all successful but Wood's strike was pushed onto the post by Bentley for a 7–6 Southend victory.

=== Details ===
23 May 2015
17:30

Wycombe Wanderers	1–1 (a.e.t.)	Southend United
Bentley 95' (o.g.)	Report	Pigott 120+2'
Penalties
Murphy (penalty scored); Mawson (penalty scored); Hayes (penalty scored); Bloomfield (penalty missed); Bean (penalty scored); Jacobson (penalty scored); Amadi-Holloway (penalty scored); Wood (penalty missed)	6–7	(penalty scored) Pigott; (penalty missed) Coker; (penalty scored) Leonard; (penalty scored) Payne; (penalty scored) Timlin; (penalty scored) Barrett; (penalty scored) Weston; (penalty scored) Bolger

Wembley Stadium, London
Attendance: 38,252
Referee: Simon Hooper

Wycombe Wanderers	Southend United

GK	21	Alex Lynch
RB	8	Marcus Bean
CB	26	Alfie Mawson	(yellow card) 90'
CB	6	Aaron Pierre
LB	3	Joe Jacobson
DM	4	Nico Yennaris		(substituted off) 111'
DM	11	Sam Wood	(yellow card) 114'
AM	7	Sam Saunders		(substituted off) 4'
RF	9	Paul Hayes (c)	(yellow card) 22'
LF	31	Hogan Ephraim		(substituted off) 85'
CF	25	Aaron Amadi-Holloway
Substitutes:
GK	20	Charlie Horlock
DF	15	Peter Murphy		(substituted on) 111'
MF	10	Matt Bloomfield		(substituted on) 4'
MF	22	Max Kretzschmar
FW	12	Steven Craig		(substituted on) 85'
FW	23	Fred Onyedinma
Manager:
Gareth Ainsworth

GK	1	Dan Bentley
RB	2	John White (c)
CB	15	Cian Bolger	(yellow card) 31'
CB	26	Adam Barrett
LB	3	Ben Coker
RM	7	David Worrall		(substituted off) 97'
CM	12	Will Atkinson		(substituted off) 80'
CM	18	Ryan Leonard	(yellow card) 104'
CM	8	Michael Timlin
LM	25	Stephen McLaughlin		(substituted off) 60'
CF	10	Barry Corr
Substitutes:
GK	13	Ted Smith
DF	6	Luke Prosser
MF	11	Myles Weston		(substituted on) 80'
MF	19	Jack Payne		(substituted on) 97'
MF	22	Gary Deegan
FW	24	Jake Cassidy
FW	32	Joe Pigott		(substituted on) 60'
Manager:
Phil Brown

Statistics
	Southend United	Wycombe Wanderers
Total shots	17	18
Shots on target	3	4
Ball possession	56%	44%
Corner kicks	8	4
Fouls committed	23	19
Yellow cards	2	3
Red cards	0	0

== Post-match ==
Both Gareth Ainsworth and Phil Brown, the opposing managers, watched the penalty shootout together. Wycombe ended their following season in thirteenth place in League Two while Southend's next season saw them finish in fifteenth position in the League One table.
