= 2015 Football League play-offs =

Football League play-offs
- Season: 2014–15
- Champions: Norwich City (Championship); Preston North End (League One); Southend United (League Two)
- Matches: 15
- Goals: 51 (3.4 per match)
- Biggest home win: Middlesbrough 3–0 Brentford (Championship); Preston 3–0 Chesterfield (League One)
- Biggest away win: Plymouth 2–3 Wycombe (League Two)
- Highest scoring: Swindon 5–5 Sheffield United (10 goals)
- Highest attendance: 85,656 – Middlesbrough v Norwich (Championship Final)
- Lowest attendance: 5,183 – Stevenage v Southend United (League Two semi-final)
- Average attendance: 24,491

The Football League play-offs for the 2014–15 season (referred to as the Sky Bet Play-Offs for sponsorship reasons) began in May 2015 with the finals taking place at Wembley Stadium in London.

The play-offs began at the semi-final stage with all semi-finals being played over two legs, contested by the teams who finished in 3rd, 4th, 5th and 6th place in the Football League Championship and League One and the 4th, 5th, 6th and 7th-placed teams in the League Two table. The winners of the semi-finals then advanced to the finals, with the winner of the final gaining promotion for the following season.

== Background ==
The Football League play-offs have been held every year since 1987. They take place for each division following the conclusion of the regular season and are contested by the four clubs finishing below the automatic promotion places.

== Championship ==
Pos	Team	Pld	W	D	L	GF	GA	GD	Pts
3	Norwich City	46	25	11	10	88	48	+40	86
4	Middlesbrough	46	25	10	11	68	37	+31	85
5	Brentford	46	23	9	14	78	59	+19	78
6	Ipswich Town	46	22	12	12	72	54	+18	78

=== Semi-finals ===
==== First leg ====
8 May 2015
19:45

Brentford	1–2	Middlesbrough
Gray 54'	BBC Report	Vossen 26'; Amorebieta 90+3'

Griffin Park, London
Attendance: 11,691
Referee: Jon Moss
9 May 2015
12:15

Ipswich Town	1–1	Norwich City
Anderson 45'	BBC Report	Howson 41'

Portman Road, Ipswich
Attendance: 29,166
Referee: Anthony Taylor

==== Second leg ====
15 May 2015
19:45

Middlesbrough	3–0	Brentford
Tomlin 23'; Kike 55'; Adomah 78'	BBC Report

Riverside Stadium, Middlesbrough
Attendance: 33,266
Referee: Lee Mason

Middlesbrough won 5–1 on aggregate.

16 May 2015
12:15

Norwich City	3–1	Ipswich Town
Hoolahan 50'; Redmond 64'; Jerome 76'	BBC Report	Smith 60'

Carrow Road, Norwich
Attendance: 26,994
Referee: Roger East

Norwich City won 4–2 on aggregate.

=== Final ===
25 May 2015
15:00

Middlesbrough	0–2	Norwich City
	BBC Report	Jerome 12'; Redmond 15'

Wembley Stadium, London
Attendance: 85,656
Referee: Mike Dean

== League One ==
Pos	Team	Pld	W	D	L	GF	GA	GD	Pts
3	Preston North End	46	25	14	7	79	40	+39	89
4	Swindon Town	46	23	10	13	76	57	+19	79
5	Sheffield United	46	19	14	13	66	53	+13	71
6	Chesterfield	46	19	12	15	68	55	+13	69

=== Semi-finals ===
==== First leg ====
7 May 2015
19:45

Chesterfield	0–1	Preston North End
	BBC Report	Beckford 6'

Proact Stadium, Chesterfield
Attendance: 8,409
Referee: Mark Haywood
7 May 2015
19:45

Sheffield United	1–2	Swindon Town
Freeman 19'	BBC Report	Ricketts 51'; Byrne 90+4'

Bramall Lane, Sheffield
Attendance: 20,890
Referee: Darren Bond

==== Second leg ====
10 May 2015
12:15

Preston North End	3–0	Chesterfield
Beckford 38', 87'; Garner 62' (pen.)	BBC Report

Deepdale, Preston
Attendance: 15,641
Referee: Andy D'Urso

Preston North End won 4–0 on aggregate.

11 May 2015
19:45

Swindon Town	5–5	Sheffield United
Gladwin 4', 10'; Smith 18', 59' (pen.); Obika 84'	BBC Report	Thompson 19' (o.g.); Basham 38'; Davies 65'; Done 88'; Adams 90'

County Ground, Swindon
Attendance: 13,065
Referee: Keith Hill

Swindon Town won 7–6 on aggregate.

=== Final ===
24 May 2015
17:30

Preston North End	4–0	Swindon Town
Beckford 3', 44', 57'; Huntington 13'	Report

Wembley Stadium, London
Attendance: 48,236
Referee: Andrew Madley

== League Two ==
Pos	Team	Pld	W	D	L	GF	GA	GD	Pts
4	Wycombe Wanderers	46	23	15	8	67	45	+22	84
5	Southend United	46	24	12	10	54	38	+16	84
6	Stevenage	46	20	12	14	62	54	+8	72
7	Plymouth Argyle	46	20	11	15	55	37	+18	71

=== Semi-finals ===
==== First leg ====
9 May 2015
19:45

Plymouth Argyle	2–3	Wycombe Wanderers
Ansah 86'; Banton 89'	BBC Report	Hayes 10'; Amadi-Holloway 22'; Craig 52'

Home Park, Plymouth
Attendance: 14,175
Referee: Peter Bankes
10 May 2015
18:35

Stevenage	1–1	Southend United
Parrett 51'	BBC Report	Corr 60'

Lamex Stadium, Stevenage
Attendance: 5,183
Referee: Keith Stroud

==== Second leg ====
14 May 2015
19:45

Wycombe Wanderers	2–1	Plymouth Argyle
Hayes 7'; Mawson 35'	BBC Sport	Brunt 70'

Adams Park, High Wycombe
Attendance: 7,750
Referee: Nigel Miller

Wycombe Wanderers won 5–3 on aggregate.

14 May 2015
19:45

Southend United	3–1 (a.e.t.)	Stevenage
Leonard 67'; McLaughlin 108'; Timlin 120'	BBC Sport	Pett 55'

Roots Hall, Southend-on-Sea
Attendance: 8,998
Referee: Graham Scott

Southend United won 4–2 on aggregate.

=== Final ===
23 May 2015
17:30

Southend United	1–1 (a.e.t.)	Wycombe Wanderers
Pigott 120+2'	Report	Bentley 95' (o.g.)
Penalties
Pigott (penalty scored); Coker (penalty missed); Leonard (penalty scored); Payne (penalty scored); Timlin (penalty scored); Barrett (penalty scored); Weston (penalty scored); Bolger (penalty scored)	7–6	(penalty scored) Murphy; (penalty scored) Mawson; (penalty scored) Hayes; (penalty missed) Bloomfield; (penalty scored) Bean; (penalty scored) Jacobson; (penalty scored) Amadi-Holloway; (penalty missed) Wood

Wembley Stadium, London
Attendance: 38,252
Referee: Simon Hooper
