= Ted Smith (footballer, born 1996) =

English footballer

Personal information
- Full name: Edward James Smith
- Date of birth: 18 January 1996 (age 30)
- Place of birth: South Benfleet, England
- Height: 6 ft 1 in (1.85 m)
- Position: Goalkeeper

Youth career
- –2014: Southend United

Senior career*
Years	Team	Apps	(Gls)
2014–2019	Southend United	26	(0)

International career
2013–2014	England U18	3	(0)
2014	England U19	2	(0)
2015–2016	England U20	4	(0)
- * Club domestic league appearances and goals as of 00:01, 7 July 2019 (UTC)

Edward James Smith (born 18 January 1996) is an English former professional footballer who played as a goalkeeper. He last played in the English Football League for Southend United.

== Personal life ==
Smith was born in South Benfleet, Essex. He attended King John School and his former PE teacher, Simon Webb, said: "He was a very dedicated student and worked very hard on his football. When he first went in goal he was actually quite small but he used to devy gravity with how high he could jump to stop shots going in the top corner. He's grown a lot since then and hopefully he can go on to enjoy more success in his career."

== Club career ==
Smith began his football career at Southend United, first joining them at twelve years old. He previously went "through the fence at Boots & Laces as a 10 and 11-year-old". While progressing at the club's youth system, Smith was called up to the first team by Manager Paul Sturrock for a match against Exeter City following the absence of Paul Smith. He later appeared as an unused substitute two more times later in the 2012–13 season.

At the start of the 2013–14 season, Smith was given the captaincy for the development squad by Ricky Duncan, saying: "Ted is an excellent leader and probably one of the best I've had since I've been at Southend. He's reliable off the pitch just as he is on it and makes sure the lads are doing what they should be when the coaches aren't around. Ted is a very good goalkeeper and seeing Daniel Bentley doing so well for the first-team will give him the confidence to play well for us and try and push on." Five months later, he signed his first professional contract with Southend United. Smith, once again, appeared as an unused substitute three more times later in the 2013–14 season. At some point around March, he played twice for Southampton B Team as part of regaining some fitness and gain experience with top level goalkeepers after given permission by Manager Phil Brown to do so.

In the 2014–15 season, Smith was given the captaincy for the development squad under the management of Graham Coughlan. His performance led Manager Phil Brown promote him to the Southend United's first team. On 14 February 2015, Smith made his first-team debut for the club deputising for Dan Bentley after an injury, playing from the start of a League Two defeat to Accrington Stanley. His first clean sheet came on 28 February 2015 in a 2–0 victory over Carlisle United. This was followed up by keeping his second clean sheet, in a 0–0 draw against AFC Wimbledon. Later in the 2014–15 season saw Southend United promoted to League One after beating Wycombe Wanderers 8–7 in the penalty shootout following a 1–1 draw throughout 120 minutes in the Football League Two play-off final. In total, Smith made four starts for Southend United during the 2014–15 season.

Throughout the 2015–16 season, Smith became the club's second choice goalkeeper and continued to remain in the position despite suffering injuries along the way. It was announced on 1 October 2015 that he signed a contract with Southend United, keeping him until 2018. After Bentley was dropped to the substitute bench, Smith made his first appearance of the season, starting against Wigan Athletic on 23 April 2016, as the club lost 4–1. He then started in the remaining two matches of the 2015–16 season against Bradford City and Bury. At the end of the 2015–16 season, Smith made three appearances in all competitions.

Having started in the first five matches of the 2016–17 season on the substitute bench, Smith made his first appearance of the season for Southend United, as he helped the club keep a clean sheet, winning 2–0 against Brighton & Hove Albion U23 in the EFL Trophy. Smith started in the next two league matches before returning to the substitute bench. The next three months saw him placed on the substitute bench as Southend United's second choice goalkeeper behind Mark Oxley. This continues until Oxley suffered an injury, resulting in Smith starting against AFC Wimbledon on 26 December 2016 and kept a clean sheet, in a 3–0 win. After the match, Manager Brown praised his performance. Since then, he became the club's first choice goalkeeper. However, Smith suffered an arm injury that kept him out for the rest of the 2016–17 season. Despite the injury, he was named as Southend United's Young Player of the Season. At the end of the season, Smith made twenty–one appearances in all competitions.

The start to the 2017–18 season saw Smith recovered from his arm injury and made his first appearance (and only appearance) of the season, losing 2–0 against Newport County in the first round of the EFL Cup. However, he continued to remain as the club's second choice goalkeeper behind Oxley and was placed on the substitute bench. This lasted until Smith suffered a shoulder injury that kept him out for the rest of the 2017–18 season. Having finished the 2017–18 season with one appearance, he signed a contract extension with Southend United, keeping him until 2019.

The start of the 2018–19 season saw Smith continuing to recover from a shoulder injury. By November, he appeared as an unused substitute for the match against Barnsley. However, Smith's return was short–lived when he suffered "a slight knock in training" and was sidelined for a month. After returning to the substitute bench in December, Smith made his first (and only) appearance of the 2018–19 season against Portsmouth on 8 January 2019 in the last 16 of the EFL Trophy, as Southend United lost 2–0. Following the match, he said "the match really important night from a personal point of view". Following this, Smith continued to remain in the substitute bench for the rest of the 2018–19 season. He was released by Southend United at the end of the 2018–19 season.

Following his release by the club, he went on a trial with Premier League side Tottenham Hotspur on two separate occasions. In April 2020, Smith announced his retirement from football. Following this, he announced that he has started a goalkeeping glove company called OKAMI goalkeeping

== International career ==
Smith has represented England at under-18, under-19 and under-20 levels.

In September 2013, Smith was called up to the England U18 for the first time. Smith made his England U18 debut, starting a match and playing 88 minutes before being substituted, as he kept a clean sheet, in a 4–0 win against Hungary U18 on 14 October 2013. Four months later, Smith, once again, called up to the U18 squad. He made his second appearance for England U18 against Belgium U18 on 18 February 2014 and kept a clean sheet, in a 4–0 win. Smith went on to make three appearances for England U18.

In October 2014, Smith was called up to the England U19 for the first time. He made his England U19 debut, starting the whole game, and kept a clean sheet, in an 8–0 win against Luxembourg U19 on 12 October 2014. A month later on 14 November 2014, Smith made his second (and last) appearance for the U19 side, keeping a clean sheet, in a 3–0 win against Italy U19.

In August 2015, Smith was called up to the England U20 squad. He made his England U20 debut, starting the whole game, in a 1–0 loss against Czech Republic U20 on 7 September 2015. Smith went on to make four appearances for the U20 side.

== Career statistics ==
As of end of 2018–19 season

Appearances and goals by club, season and competition
Club	Season	League			FA Cup		EFL Cup		Other		Total	
Club	Season	Division	Apps	Goals	Apps	Goals	Apps	Goals	Apps	Goals	Apps	Goals
Southend United	2014–15	League Two	4	0	0	0	0	0	0	0	4	0
Southend United	2015–16	League One	3	0	0	0	0	0	0	0	3	0
Southend United	2016–17	League One	19	0	0	0	0	0	2 (Note: Appearance(s) in EFL Trophy)	0	21	0
Southend United	2017–18	League One	0	0	0	0	1	0	0	0	1	0
Southend United	2018–19	League One	0	0	0	0	0	0	1	0	1	0
Career total			26	0	0	0	1	0	3	0	30	0

== Honours ==
Southend United

- Football League Two play-offs: 2015
