= Gozie Ugwu =

English footballer (born 1993)

Gozie Ugw
Personal information
- Full name: Chigozie Eze Ugwu
- Date of birth: 22 April 1993 (age 33)
- Place of birth: Oxford, England
- Height: 1.88 m (6 ft 2 in)
- Position: Forward

Youth career
- 2006–2011: Reading

Senior career*
Years	Team	Apps	(Gls)
2011–2014	Reading	0	(0)
2012	→ Ebbsfleet United (loan)	9	(4)
2012–2013	→ Yeovil Town (loan)	15	(3)
2013	→ Plymouth Argyle (loan)	6	(0)
2013–2014	→ Shrewsbury Town (loan)	7	(1)
2014	Dunfermline Athletic	14	(7)
2015	Yeovil Town	22	(5)
2015–2016	Wycombe Wanderers	29	(2)
2016–2017	Woking	43	(21)
2017–2019	Chesterfield	19	(0)
2018–2019	→ Boreham Wood (loan)	21	(4)
2019	→ Ebbsfleet United (loan)	8	(2)
2019–2020	Ebbsfleet United	38	(15)
2020–2021	Raith Rovers	13	(3)
2021–2022	Greenock Morton	31	(8)
2022–2023	Jeddah	30	(11)
2023–2024	Al-Entesar	9	(5)
2024–2025	Al-Ain	4	(0)
2025	Nejmeh	6	(0)
- * Club domestic league appearances and goals as of 12:04, 19 September 2025 (UTC)

Chigozie Eze Ugwu (born 22 April 1993) is an English professional footballer who plays as a forward. He made his debut in the Football League in 2012, and his debut in the Scottish Professional Football League in 2014.

== Club career ==
=== Reading ===
Ugwu was born in Oxford, Oxfordshire. He began his career with Reading and progressed through the club's academy to sign a first professional contract in June 2011. He joined Conference National side Ebbsfleet United on a one-month loan in January 2012, and made his debut in a 1–0 FA Trophy defeat at York City. Ugwu his first goal for the club in a 3–2 win at Bath City, and two more in his next three appearances, against Southport and Gateshead, before the loan was extended by a further month. He returned to Reading at the start of April to try and earn a new contract after scoring four goals in ten league and cup appearances for Ebbsfleet.

He signed a new two-year contract with Reading in July 2012 and joined League One side Yeovil Town on loan for six months. Ugwu made his debut in a 3–0 League Cup win against Colchester United in August, and scored his first two goals for Yeovil in a 4–0 win at Scunthorpe United eleven days later. He scored one more goal, against Doncaster Rovers, and returned to Reading at the start of January 2013 after making five starts and 13 substitute appearances for Yeovil. Soon after his return, Ugwu was included in a Reading match-day squad for the first time ahead of an FA Cup tie with Crawley Town. He was named among the substitutes but did not make an appearance in a 3–1 win for Reading.

Later in January, Ugwu joined League Two club Plymouth Argyle on a one-month youth loan. In his second week with the club, he injured his ankle and was unavailable for two matches. He resumed training in February and made his debut for Argyle two days later in a 2–1 win at Aldershot Town as a second-half substitute. Despite his injury hit start, manager John Sheridan was keen to extend Ugwu's stay and on 19 February his loan was extended for a further month. Having started only two games, and with Reading keen for Ugwu to get playing time, he was recalled from loan on 11 March.

On 14 November 2013, Ugwu signed on loan for Shrewsbury Town until January and made his debut two days later in a 3–1 defeat to Port Vale. He returned to Reading having scored once in seven appearances after Shrewsbury manager Graham Turner decided against renewing his loan. On his decision not to extend Ugwu's stay, Turner commented that despite a positive start, he felt criticism from the fans had impacted on his performances.

In May 2014 he left Reading following the expiry of his contract, going on to have trials with Oxford United and Dagenham & Redbridge.

=== Dunfermline Athletic ===
On 2 August 2014, Ugwu joined Scottish League One side Dunfermline Athletic. He made his debut days later, coming on as a substitute in the 88th minute of the Scottish Challenge Cup match against Raith Rovers. On 23 August 2014, Ugwu scored twice in 3–0 home victory over Airdrieonians, netting in the 24th and 80th minute. On 22 November 2014, Ugwu scored his first career hat-trick in a 4–0 home victory against Stirling Albion, netting all three goals in the space of 60 minutes.

=== Yeovil Town ===
Following his release from Dunfermline, Ugwu rejoined Yeovil Town on 15 January 2015 until the end of the season. Despite finishing the season as Yeovil's joint top goalscorer with five, Ugwu was released by Yeovil at the end of the 2014–15 season following their relegation to League Two.

=== Wycombe Wanderers ===
On 9 September 2015, Ugwu signed a permanent deal with Wycombe Wanderers to the end of the 2015–16 season. Three days later, Ugwu was given his debut by manager Gareth Ainsworth in Wycombe's 2–1 home defeat against Plymouth Argyle, playing the full 90 minutes. A week later, Ugwu went onto score his first goal for Wycombe Wanderers in their 1–1 draw with Leyton Orient, opening the scoring just before half time. On 30 January 2016, Ugwu scored the winner in Wycombe's reverse fixture against Plymouth Argyle, netting the only goal of the game in the 3rd minute.

On 9 May 2016, it was announced that Ugwu would leave the club upon the expiry of his contract on 30 June 2016, along with team-mates; Max Kretzschmar, Alex Lynch and Ryan Sellers.

=== Woking ===
On 15 July 2016, Ugwu joined National League side Woking on a one-year deal. On 6 August 2016, Ugwu made his Woking debut in a 3–1 home defeat against Lincoln City, playing the full 90 minutes.

On 27 August 2016, Ugwu scored his first Woking goal in a 4–1 defeat against York City, netting the opener in the 8th minute. Two days later, Ugwu went on to score Woking's third against Chester, in the Cards first victory of the 2016–17 campaign. On 18 October 2016, in an FA Cup fourth qualifying round replay against Torquay United, Ugwu scored a brace to send Woking through to the first round. In following round of the FA Cup, Ugwu once again scored a brace to assist Woking to a 4–2 victory over Stockport County. On 26 November 2016, Ugwu scored his first Woking hat-trick in a 3–0 home victory against Gateshead, sealing his 12th goal of the season. On 1 April 2017, Ugwu came off the bench to score the winner in Woking's 2–1 victory over Sutton United, after being dropped for new signing Jamie Lucas. On 17 April 2017, Ugwu scored his 20th goal of the campaign, in Woking's 3–2 away victory against Chester, converting a penalty in the 91st minute.

=== Chesterfield ===
On 25 May 2017, Ugwu joined League Two side Chesterfield on a two-year deal. On 5 August 2017, Ugwu made his Chesterfield debut during their 3–1 home defeat against Grimsby Town, featuring for the entire 90 minutes. Following sustaining a long-term thigh injury in late 2017, Ugwu returned to action during Chesterfield's penultimate fixture of the season, replacing Jerome Binnom-Williams with nineteen minutes to play in the 2–1 defeat.

=== Ebbsfleet United ===
Having finished the 2018–19 season on loan at Ebbsfleet United, Ugwu joined the club on a permanent basis on 24 June 2019.

=== Raith Rovers ===
Ugwu returned to Scotland on 20 August 2020, joining Scottish Championship club Raith Rovers.

=== Morton ===
Ugwu then moved to another Scottish club, Greenock Morton, in June 2021.

=== Saudi Arabia ===
In August 2022, Ugwu moved to Saudi Arabia to join second-tier Jeddah Club. On 2 October 2023, Ugwu joined Saudi Second Division side Al-Entesar. On 14 September 2024, Ugwu joined First Division side Al-Ain.

After three years in Saudi Arabia, Ugwu joined Lebanese Premier League side Nejmeh in April 2025.

== Personal life ==
Born in England, Ugwu is of Nigerian descent.

== Career statistics ==
As of match played on 10 November 2024

Appearances and goals by club, season and competition
Club	Season	League			National Cup		League Cup		Other		Total	
Club	Season	Division	Apps	Goals	Apps	Goals	Apps	Goals	Apps	Goals	Apps	Goals
Ebbsfleet United (loan)	2011–12	Conference Premier	9	5	0	0	—		1 (Note: Appearance(s) in the FA Trophy)	0	10	5
Yeovil Town (loan)	2012–13	League One	15	3	0	0	2	0	1 (Note: Appearance(s) in the Football League Trophy)	0	18	3
Plymouth Argyle (loan)	2012–13	League Two	6	0	0	0	0	0	0	0	6	0
Shrewsbury Town (loan)	2013–14	League One	7	1	0	0	0	0	0	0	7	1
Dunfermline Athletic	2014–15	Scottish League One	14	7	1	0	1	0	2 (Note: Appearance(s) in the Scottish Challenge Cup)	0	18	7
Yeovil Town	2014–15	League One	22	5	0	0	0	0	0	0	22	5
Wycombe Wanderers	2015–16	League Two	29	2	3	0	0	0	0	0	32	2
Woking	2016–17	National League	43	17	4	4	—		2	0	49	21
Chesterfield	2017–18	League Two	12	0	0	0	1	0	1 (Note: Appearance(s) in the EFL Trophy)	0	14	0
Chesterfield	2018–19	National League	7	0	0	0	—		0	0	7	0
Chesterfield	Total		19	0	0	0	1	0	1	0	21	0
Boreham Wood (loan)	2018–19	National League	21	4	1	0	—		0	0	22	4
Ebbsfleet United (loan)	2018–19	National League	8	2	0	0	—		0	0	8	2
Ebbsfleet United	2019–20	National League	24	13	3	2	—		1	1	28	16
Raith Rovers	2020–21	Scottish Championship	13	3	2	1	0	0	4 (Note: Appearances in the Scottish Premiership play-offs)	1	19	6
Greenock Morton	2021–22	Scottish Championship	31	8	0	0	0	0	0	0	31	8
Jeddah	2022–23	Saudi First Division League	30	11	0	0	1	0	0	0	31	11
Al-Entesar	2023–24	Saudi Second Division League	9	5	0	0	0	0	0	0	9	5
Al-Ain	2024–25	Saudi First Division League	4	0	0	0	1	0	0	0	5	0
Career total			305	86	14	7	4	0	11	1	333	96

== Honours ==
=== Club ===
Reading

- U21 Premier League Cup: 2013–14
