= 2015–16 Wycombe Wanderers F.C. season =

Wycombe Wanderers F.C.
2015–16 season
- Chairman: Andrew Howard
- Manager: Gareth Ainsworth
- Stadium: Adams Park
- League Two: 13th
- FA Cup: Third round
- League Cup: First round
- League Trophy: Second round
- Top goalscorer: Garry Thompson (7)
- Highest home attendance: 9,298 vs. Aston Villa; 9 January 2016
- Lowest home attendance: 2,886 vs. Notts County; 15 December 2015
Home colours	Away colours

The 2015–16 season was Wycombe Wanderers' 129th season in existence and their 23rd consecutive season in the Football League.

== League data ==
=== League table ===
Pos	Team	Pld	W	D	L	GF	GA	GD	Pts
11	Luton Town	46	19	9	18	63	61	+2	66
12	Mansfield Town	46	17	13	16	61	53	+8	64
13	Wycombe Wanderers	46	17	13	16	45	44	+1	64
14	Exeter City	46	17	13	16	63	65	−2	64
15	Barnet	46	17	11	18	67	68	−1	62

Updated to match(es) played on 7 May 2016. Source: BBC Sport
Rules for classification: 1) Points; 2) Goal difference; 3) Number of goals scored

=== Results summary ===
Overall								Home						Away					
Pld	W	D	L	GF	GA	GD	Pts	W	D	L	GF	GA	GD	W	D	L	GF	GA	GD
41	17	11	13	43	37	+6	62	9	4	7	24	22	+2	8	7	6	19	15	+4

Last updated: 15 April 2016.
Source: BBC Sport

=== Results by round ===
Round	1	2	3	4	5	6	7	8	9	10	11	12	13	14	15	16	17	18	19	20	21	22	23	24	25	26	27	28	29	30	31	32	33	34	35	36	37	38	39	40	41	42	43	44	45	46
Ground	H	A	A	H	A	H	H	A	A	H	H	A	H	H	A	A	A	H	A	H	H	A	H	H	A	H	A	H	A	H	A	H	A	A	H	A	A	H	A	H	A	H	H	A	H	A
Result	W	W	W	D	D	W	L	D	W	W	L	L	L	D	W	D	W	D	L	D	W	W	W	L	L	L	W	L	W	W	L	W	L	L	W	D	D	W	D	L	D	D	D	L	L	L
Position	3	1	2	2	3	2	4	4	2	1	2	8	10	10	9	11	9	9	9	10	9	6	5	6	6	9	8	10	6	4	8	6	9	9	8	7	8	7	7	7	8	8	8	9	10	13

Updated to match(es) played on 15 April 2016. Source:
A = Away; H = Home; W = Win; D = Draw; L = Loss

=== Scores overview ===
Wycombe Wanderers' score given first.

Opposition	Home Score	Away Score
Accrington Stanley	0–1	1–1
AFC Wimbledon	1–2	1–1
Barnet	1–1	2–0
Bristol Rovers	1–0	0–3
Cambridge United	1–0	0–1
Carlisle United	1–1	1–1
Crawley Town	2–0	0–0
Dagenham & Redbridge	1–1	2–1
Exeter City	1–0	2–0
Hartlepool United	2–1	0–1
Leyton Orient	0–2	1–1
Luton Town	0–1	2–0
Mansfield Town	1–0	2–0
Morecambe	0–2	1–0
Newport County	0–2	0–1
Northampton Town	2–3	0–1
Notts County	2–2	0–0
Oxford United	2–1	0–3
Plymouth Argyle	1–2	1–0
Portsmouth	2–2	1–2
Stevenage	1–0	1–2
Yeovil Town	0–0	1–0
York City	3–0	1–1

== Match details ==
=== Legend ===
Win	Draw	Loss

=== Friendlies ===
16 July 2015 1	US Avranches	2–1	Wycombe Wanderers	Avranches, France
18:30 CEST	25' (pen.); 86'	Report	Trialist (Maguire) 78'	Stadium: Stade René Fenouillère; Attendance: 200

21 July 2015 2	Wealdstone	1–3	Wycombe Wanderers	Ruislip
19:45 BST	Godfrey 31'	Report	Trialist (O'Nien) 34'; Trialist (McGinn) 53'; Thompson 59'	Stadium: Vale Stadium; Attendance: 390

28 July 2015 3	Basingstoke Town	1–3	Wycombe Wanderers	Basingstoke
19:45 BST	Ray 64'	Report	Bean 30'; Stewart 55'; Sellers 59'	Stadium: The Camrose

1 August 2015 4	Aldershot Town	1–1	Wycombe Wanderers	Aldershot
15:00 BST	Hatton 55'	Report	Amadi-Holloway 78'	Stadium: Recreation Ground

=== League Two ===
The fixtures for the 2015–16 season were announced on 17 June 2015.

8 August 2015 1	Wycombe Wanderers	3–0	York City	High Wycombe
15:00 BST	Stewart 7'; Amadi-Holloway 28'; Zubar 58' (o.g.)	Report		Stadium: Adams Park; Attendance: 3,688 (376 away); Referee: Oliver Langord

15 August 2015 2	Barnet	0–2	Wycombe Wanderers	London
15:00 BST		Report	Thompson 53', 90+6'	Stadium: The Hive Stadium; Attendance: 2,563 (902 away); Referee: Charles Breakspear

18 August 2015 3	Morecambe	0–1	Wycombe Wanderers	Morecambe
19:45 BST		Report	Pierre 74'	Stadium: Globe Arena; Attendance: 1,395 (181 away); Referee: Mark Haywood

22 August 2015 4	Wycombe Wanderers	1–1	Dagenham & Redbridge	High Wycombe
15:00 BST	Pierre 90+5'	Report	McClure 7'	Stadium: Adams Park; Attendance: 3,343 (104 away); Referee: Darren England

29 August 2015 5	Crawley Town	0–0	Wycombe Wanderers	Crawley
15:00 BST		Report		Stadium: Broadfield Stadium; Attendance: 2,466 (748 away); Referee: Lee Swabey

5 September 2015 6	Wycombe Wanderers	2–1	Hartlepool United	High Wycombe
15:00 BST	Harriman 26', 56'	Report	Magnay 43'	Stadium: Adams Park; Attendance: 3,468 (187 away); Referee: Darren Deadman

12 September 2015 7	Wycombe Wanderers	1–2	Plymouth Argyle	High Wycombe
15:00 BST	Banton 12'	Report	Reid 4'; Jervis 32'	Stadium: Adams Park; Attendance: 4,223 (777 away); Referee: Tim Robinson

19 September 2015 8	Leyton Orient	1–1	Wycombe Wanderers	London
15:00 BST	Simpson 66'	Report	Ugwu 40'	Stadium: Brisbane Road; Attendance: 5,946 (835 away); Referee: James Linington

26 September 2015 9	Exeter City	0–2	Wycombe Wanderers	Exeter
15:00 BST		Report	Jacobson 50'; Thompson 57'	Stadium: St James Park; Attendance: 3,639 (360 away); Referee: Stephen Martin

29 September 2015 10	Wycombe Wanderers	1–0	Cambridge United	High Wycombe
19:45 BST	Harriman 70'	Report		Stadium: Adams Park; Attendance: 3,152 (295 away); Referee: Stuart Attwell

3 October 2015 11	Wycombe Wanderers	2–3	Northampton Town	High Wycombe
15:00 BST	O'Nien 2'; Rowe 82'	Report	Richards 35'; D'Ath 47'; Brisley 51'	Stadium: Adams Park; Attendance: 4,227 (597 away); Referee: Keith Hill

17 October 2015 12	Stevenage	2–1	Wycombe Wanderers	Stevenage
15:00 BST	Joronen 10'; Gnanduillet 60'	Report	Kretzchmar 79'	Stadium: Broadhall Way; Attendance: 3,292 (738 away); Referee: Ben Toner

20 October 2015 13	Wycombe Wanderers	0–2	Newport County	High Wycombe
19:45 BST		Report	Bean 62' (o.g.); Boden 89'	Stadium: Adams Park; Attendance: 2,940 (33 away); Referee: Fred Graham

24 October 2015 14	Wycombe Wanderers	1–1	Carlisle United	High Wycombe
15:00 BST	Hayes 90'		Archibald-Henville 47'	Stadium: Adams Park; Attendance: 3,457 (97 away); Referee: Robert Lewis

31 October 2015 15	Mansfield Town	0–2	Wycombe Wanderers	Mansfield
15:00 GMT			O'Nien 8'; Amadi-Holloway 90'	Stadium: Field Mill; Attendance: 3,165 (345 away); Referee: Seb Stockbridge

21 November 2015 16	AFC Wimbledon	1–1	Wycombe Wanderers	London
15:00 GMT	Azeez 90+1'	Report	McCarthy 51'	Stadium: Kingsmeadow; Attendance: 4,482 (749 away); Referee: Phil Gibbs

24 November 2015 17	Yeovil Town	0–1	Wycombe Wanderers	Yeovil
19:45 GMT		Report	O'Nien 70'	Stadium: Huish Park; Attendance: 2,963 (154 away); Referee: Darren Deadman

28 November 2015 18	Wycombe Wanderers	2–2	Portsmouth	High Wycombe
15:00 GMT	Harriman 28'; Thompson 30'	Report	Lavery 45+1'; Webster 56'	Stadium: Adams Park; Attendance: 5,816 (1,976 away); Referee: Mark Haywood

1 December 2015 19	Bristol Rovers	3–0	Wycombe Wanderers	Bristol
19:45 GMT		Report	Taylor 60', 62', 72'	Stadium: Memorial Stadium; Attendance: 6,136 (255 away); Referee: Brendan Malone

15 December 2015 20	Wycombe Wanderers	2–2	Notts County	High Wycombe
19:45 GMT	Harriman 44'; Amadi-Holloway 62'	Report	Stead 8' (pen.); Campbell 47'	Stadium: Adams Park; Attendance: 2,886 (142 away); Referee: Nick Kinseley

19 December 2015 21	Wycombe Wanderers	2–1	Oxford United	High Wycombe
15:00 GMT	Thompson 50'; McCarthy 76'	Report	Sercombe 65'	Stadium: Adams Park; Attendance: 5,742 (1,773 away); Referee: Neil Swarbrick

26 December 2015 22	Luton Town	0–2	Wycombe Wanderers	Luton
15:00 GMT		Report	Thompson 51'; Hayes 66'	Stadium: Kenilworth Road; Attendance: 9,676 (829 away); Referee: Dean Whitestone

28 December 2015 23	Wycombe Wanderers	2–0	Crawley Town	High Wycombe
15:00 GMT	Kretzschmar 7'; Wood 90+1'	Report		Stadium: Adams Park; Attendance: 4,153 (232 away); Referee: Darren Drysdale

2 January 2016 24	Wycombe Wanderers	0–2	Morecambe	High Wycombe
15:00 GMT		Report	Miller 54'; Devitt 84' (pen.)	Stadium: Adams Park; Attendance: 3,555 (39 away); Referee: Andy Davies

16 January 2016 25	Hartlepool United	1–0	Wycombe Wanderers	Hartlepool
15:00 GMT	Fenwick 33'	Report		Stadium: Victoria Park; Attendance: 3,721 (152 away); Referee: Mark Brown

23 January 2016 26	Wycombe Wanderers	0–2	Leyton Orient	High Wycombe
15:00 GMT		Report	Simpson 64'; Jahraldo-Martin 89'	Stadium: Adams Park; Attendance: 4,432 (805 away); Referee: Darren Bond

30 January 2016 27	Plymouth Argyle	0–1	Wycombe Wanderers	Plymouth
15:00 GMT		Report	Ugwu 3'	Stadium: Home Park; Attendance: 8,458 (222 away); Referee: Philip Gibbs

6 February 2016 28	Wycombe Wanderers	0–1	Luton Town	High Wycombe
15:00 GMT		Report	McGeehan 40'	Stadium: Adams Park; Attendance: 4,597 (1,298 away); Referee: Seb Stockbridge

9 February 2016 29	Dagenham & Redbridge	1–2	Wycombe Wanderers	London
19:45 GMT	Guttridge 72'	Report	Hayes 45+2'; Cowan-Hall 75'	Stadium: Victoria Road; Referee: Keith Stroud

13 February 2016 30	Wycombe Wanderers	1–0	Exeter City	High Wycombe
15:00 GMT	McGinn 53'	Report		Stadium: Adams Park; Attendance: 3,358 (390 away); Referee: David Webb

20 February 2016 31	Northampton Town	1–0	Wycombe Wanderers	Northampton
15:00 GMT	Rose 63'	Report		Stadium: Sixfields Stadium; Attendance: 5,755 (809 away); Referee: Graham Salisbury

27 February 2016 32	Wycombe Wanderers	1–0	Bristol Rovers	High Wycombe
15:00 GMT	O'Nien 85'	Report		Stadium: Adams Park; Attendance: 4,759 (1,629 away); Referee: Chris Sarginson

1 March 2016 33	Cambridge United	1–0	Wycombe Wanderers	Cambridge
19:45 GMT	Stewart 27' (o.g.)	Report		Stadium: Abbey Stadium; Attendance: 4,141 (325 away); Referee: Andy Davies

5 March 2016 34	Newport County	1–0	Wycombe Wanderers	Newport
15:00 GMT	Boden 25'	Report		Stadium: Rodney Parade; Attendance: 2,325 (302 away); Referee: Michael Bull

12 March 2016 35	Wycombe Wanderers	1–0	Stevenage	High Wycombe
15:00 GMT	O'Nien 70'	Report	Kennedy (yellow card) 67'; Tonge (yellow card) 90+5'	Stadium: Adams Park; Attendance: 3,715 (251 away); Referee: Andy Woolmer

16 March 2016 36	Accrington Stanley	1–1	Wycombe Wanderers	Accrington
19:45 GMT	McCartan 45+2'	Report	Thompson 62'	Stadium: Crown Ground; Attendance: 1,403 (142 away); Referee: Paul Tierney

19 March 2016 37	Carlisle United	1–1	Wycombe Wanderers	Carlisle
15:00 GMT	Wyke 26'	Report	Wood 12'	Stadium: Brunton Park; Attendance: 4,532 (179 away); Referee: Tim Robinson

25 March 2016 38	Wycombe Wanderers	1–0	Mansfield Town	High Wycombe
15:00 GMT	Harriman 68'	Report		Stadium: Adams Park; Attendance: 5,003 (216 away); Referee: Iain Williamson

28 March 2016 39	Notts County	0–0	Wycombe Wanderers	Nottingham
15:00 BST		Report		Stadium: Meadow Lane; Attendance: 4,452 (579 away); Referee: Carl Boyeson

2 April 2016 40	Wycombe Wanderers	1–2	AFC Wimbledon	High Wycombe
15:00 BST	Harriman 58'	Report	Taylor 12', 66' (pen.)	Stadium: Adams Park; Attendance: 4,452 (579 away); Referee: Carl Boyeson

9 April 2016 41	York City	1–1	Wycombe Wanderers	York
15:00 BST	Oliver 35'	Report	Bloomfield 88'	Stadium: Bootham Crescent; Attendance: 2,864 (305 away); Referee: Eddie Ilderton

16 April 2016 42	Wycombe Wanderers	1–1	Barnet	High Wycombe
15:00 BST	Hayes 58'	Report	Yiadom 72'	Stadium: Adams Park; Attendance: 3,715 (244 away); Referee: Gavin Ward

19 April 2016 43	Wycombe Wanderers	0–0	Yeovil Town	High Wycombe
19:45 BST		Report		Stadium: Adams Park; Attendance: 2,812 (121 away); Referee: Lee Collins

23 April 2016 44	Portsmouth	2–1	Wycombe Wanderers	Portsmouth
15:00 BST	Gary Roberts 37'; Chaplin 67'	Report	Jombati 73'	Stadium: Fratton Park; Attendance: 16,187

30 April 2016 45	Wycombe Wanderers	0–1	Accrington Stanley	High Wycombe
19:45 BST		Report	Hughes 78'	Stadium: Adams Park; Attendance: 4,041

23 April 2016 46	Oxford United	3–0	Wycombe Wanderers	Oxford
15:00 BST	Dunkley 45'; Maguire 72'; O'Dowda 90'	Report		Stadium: Kassam Stadium; Attendance: 11,815

=== FA Cup ===
8 November 2015 1	FC Halifax Town	0–4	Wycombe Wanderers	Halifax
14:00 GMT		Report	Thompson 17'; Jombati 65'; Kretzschmar 84'; Amadi-Holloway 90+3'	Stadium: The Shay; Attendance: 1,789 (249 away); Referee: Graham Salisbury

5 December 2015 2	Millwall	1–2	Wycombe Wanderers	London
15:00 GMT	Thompson 57'	Report	Hayes 50'; Harriman 90+4'	Stadium: The Den; Attendance: 3,960 (658 away); Referee: Fred Graham

9 January 2016 3	Wycombe Wanderers	1–1	Aston Villa	High Wycombe
12:45 GMT	Jacobson 50' (pen.)	Report	Richards 22'	Stadium: Adams Park; Attendance: 9,298 (2,690 away); Referee: Michael Oliver

19 January 2016 3 Replay	Aston Villa	2–0	Wycombe Wanderers	Birmingham
19:45 GMT	Clark 75'; Gueye 90'	Report		Stadium: Villa Park; Attendance: 20,706 (4,100 away); Referee: Craig Pawson

=== League Cup ===
11 August 2015 1	Wycombe Wanderers	0–1	Fulham	High Wycombe
19:45 BST		Report	Kačaniklić 69'	Stadium: Adams Park; Attendance: 4,012 (1,500 away); Referee: Gavin Ward

=== Football League Trophy ===
Wycombe received a bye for the first round so entered the tournament in the second round.

6 October 2015 1	Bristol Rovers	2–0	Wycombe Wanderers	Bristol
19:45 BST	Taylor 4'; Easter 11'	Report		Stadium: Memorial Stadium; Attendance: 3,243 (123 away); Referee: Keith Hill

== Team details ==
=== Squad information ===
No.	Nationality	Name	Age	Joined club (Note: Year that player became a Wycombe first-team player)
GOALKEEPERS
1	(England)	Ryan Allsop†	34	2016
13	(England)	Barry Richardson	57	2014
21	(Wales)	Alex Lynch	31	2014
25	(Switzerland)	Benjamin Siegrist†	34	2016
DEFENDERS
2	(Portugal)	Sido Jombati	39	2014
3	(Wales)	Joe Jacobson	39	2014
5	(England)	Anthony Stewart	34	2015
6	(Grenada)	Aaron Pierre	33	2014
15	(England)	Ryan Sellers	32	2015
18	(England)	Danny Rowe	32	2015
19	(Republic of Ireland)	Michael Harriman	34	2015
22	(England)	Jason McCarthy†	30	2015
MIDFIELDERS
4	(Scotland)	Stephen McGinn	38	2015
8	(Jamaica)	Marcus Bean	42	2014
10	(England)	Matt Bloomfield	42	2003
11	(England)	Sam Wood	40	2012
17	(England)	Max Kretzschmar	33	2012
20	(England)	Luke O'Nien	31	2015
FORWARDS
7	(England)	Garry Thompson	45	2015
9	(England)	Paul Hayes (c)	43	2014
12	(England)	Rowan Liburd†	34	2016
23	(England)	Gozie Ugwu	33	2015
24	(England)	Paris Cowan-Hall†	36	2015
26	(England)	Jerell Sellars†	31	2016

† Loan player

=== Appearances and goals ===
As of 15 April 2016

No.	Pos	Nat	Player	Total		League Two		FA Cup		League Cup		League Trophy	
No.	Pos	Nat	Player	Apps	Goals	Apps	Goals	Apps	Goals	Apps	Goals	Apps	Goals
1	GK	(England) ENG	Ryan Allsop	14	0	14	0	0	0	0	0	0	0
2	DF	(Portugal) POR	Sido Jombati	33	1	29	0	2	1	1	0	1	0
3	DF	(Wales) WAL	Joe Jacobson	39	2	34	1	3	1	1	0	1	0
4	MF	(Scotland) SCO	Stephen McGinn	27	1	23	1	2	0	1	0	1	0
5	DF	(England) ENG	Anthony Stewart	26	1	22	1	3	0	1	0	0	0
6	DF	(Grenada) GRN	Aaron Pierre	40	2	35	2	4	0	0	0	1	0
7	FW	(England) ENG	Garry Thompson	44	7	38	6	4	1	1	0	1	0
8	MF	(Jamaica) JAM	Marcus Bean	27	0	25	0	1	0	1	0	0	0
9	FW	(England) ENG	Paul Hayes	36	4	32	3	3	1	1	0	0	0
10	MF	(England) ENG	Matt Bloomfield	32	1	27	1	4	0	0	0	1	0
11	MF	(England) ENG	Sam Wood	34	1	28	1	4	0	1	0	1	0
12	FW	(England) ENG	Rowan Liburd	7	0	7	0	0	0	0	0	0	0
13	GK	(England) ENG	Barry Richardson	1	0	1	0	0	0	0	0	0	0
15	DF	(England) ENG	Ryan Sellers	16	0	14	0	0	0	1	0	1	0
16	FW	(Wales) WAL	Aaron Amadi-Holloway	27	4	21	3	4	1	1	0	1	0
17	MF	(England) ENG	Max Kretzschmar	19	3	17	2	1	1	0	0	1	0
18	DF	(England) ENG	Danny Rowe	10	1	8	1	0	0	1	0	1	0
19	DF	(Republic of Ireland) IRL	Michael Harriman	44	6	40	5	3	1	1	0	0	0
20	MF	(England) ENG	Luke O'Nien	40	4	35	4	4	0	0	0	1	0
21	GK	(Wales) WAL	Alex Lynch	4	0	3	0	1	0	0	0	0	0
22	DF	(England) ENG	Jason McCarthy	34	2	30	2	4	0	0	0	0	0
23	FW	(England) ENG	Gozie Ugwu	27	2	24	2	3	0	0	0	0	0
24	FW	(England) ENG	Paris Cowan-Hall	5	1	5	1	0	0	0	0	0	0
25	GK	(Switzerland) SUI	Benjamin Siegrist	0	0	0	0	0	0	0	0	0	0
26	FW	(England) ENG	Jerell Sellars	4	0	4	0	0	0	0	0	0	0
Players who left the club before the end of the season:
	GK	(England) ENG	Matt Ingram	29	0	24	0	3	0	1	0	1	0
	FW	(England) ENG	Jason Banton	7	1	5	1	0	0	1	0	1	0
	DF	(Saint Lucia) LCA	Janoi Donacien	3	0	2	0	1	0	0	0	0	0
	MF	(England) ENG	Jermaine Udumaga	4	0	4	0	0	0	0	0	0	0

== Transfers ==
=== Transfers in ===
Date	Position	Nationality	Name	From	Fee	Ref.
1 July 2015	FW	ENG	Garry Thompson	Notts County	Free transfer	
1 July 2015	DF	ENG	Ryan Sellers	Free agent	Free transfer	
1 July 2015	DF	ENG	Anthony Stewart	Free agent	Free transfer	
1 July 2015	FW	ENG	Jason Banton	Free agent	Free transfer	
1 July 2015	DF	ENG	Danny Rowe	Rotherham United	Undisclosed	
25 July 2015	MF	ENG	Luke O'Nien	Free agent	Free Transfer	
4 August 2015	MF	SCO	Stephen McGinn	Dundee	Free Transfer	
9 September 2015	FW	ENG	Gozie Ugwu	Yeovil Town	Free Transfer	
6 January 2016	DF	IRL	Michael Harriman	Queens Park Rangers	Undisclosed	

=== Transfers out ===
Date	Position	Nationality	Name	To	Fee	Ref.
1 July 2015	CF	SCO	Steven Craig	N/A	Retired	
1 July 2015	MF	ENG	Nathan Evans	Free agent	Released	
1 July 2015	DF	ENG	Tommy Fletcher	Free agent	Released	
1 July 2015	GK	ENG	Charlie Horlock	Free agent	Released	
1 July 2015	FW	NIR	Matt McClure	Dagenham & Redbridge (Note: Following McClure's release on 25 May 2015, he joined Dagenham & Redbridge on 16 July 2015.)	Free transfer	
1 July 2015	MF	ENG	Peter Murphy	Morecambe	Free transfer	
22 January 2016	GK	ENG	Matt Ingram	Queens Park Rangers	Undisclosed	
29 January 2016	FW	ENG	Jason Banton	Free agent	Released	

=== Loans in ===
Date from	Position	Nationality	Name	From	Date until	Ref.
10 July 2015	DF	IRL	Michael Harriman	Queens Park Rangers	31 January 2016	
21 August 2015	DF	LCA	Janoi Donacien	Aston Villa	21 September 2015	
13 October 2015	DF	ENG	Jason McCarthy	Southampton	30 May 2016	
26 November 2015	MF	ENG	James Ferry	Brentford	23 December 2015	
26 November 2015	MF	ENG	Jermaine Udumaga	Brentford	2 February 2015	
25 January 2016	FW	ENG	Paris Cowan-Hall	Millwall	30 May 2016	
1 February 2016	GK	ENG	Ryan Allsop	Bournemouth	30 May 2016	
4 March 2016	FW	ENG	Rowan Liburd	Reading	30 May 2016	
19 March 2016	GK	SWI	Benjamin Siegrist	Aston Villa	30 May 2016	
24 March 2016	FW	ENG	Jerell Sellars	Aston Villa	30 May 2016	

=== Loans out ===
Date from	Position	Nationality	Name	To	Date until	Ref.
6 August 2015	GK	WAL	Alex Lynch	Wealdstone	5 September 2015	
16 October 2015	FW	ENG	Jason Banton	Hartlepool United	3 January 2016	
12 February 2016	FW	ENG	Aaron Amadi-Holloway	Oldham Athletic	30 May 2016	
18 February 2016	DF	ENG	Danny Rowe	Barrow	1 April 2016	
