= Dan Bentley (footballer) =

English footballer (born 1993)

- Bentley warming up for Wolverhampton Wanderers in 2025

Personal information
- Full name: Daniel Ian Bentley
- Date of birth: 13 July 1993 (age 33)
- Place of birth: Basildon, England
- Height: 6 ft 2 in (1.88 m)
- Position: Goalkeeper

Team information
- Current team: Coventry City
- Number: 25

Youth career
- Hutton Medway
- 2001–2008: Arsenal
- 2008–2009: Southend United

Senior career*
Years	Team	Apps	(Gls)
2009–2016	Southend United	141	(0)
2011	→ Braintree Town (loan)	2	(0)
2016–2019	Brentford	123	(0)
2019–2023	Bristol City	137	(0)
2023–2026	Wolverhampton Wanderers	13	(0)
2026–	Coventry City	0	(0)
- * Club domestic league appearances and goals as of 21 August 2026 (UTC)

Daniel Ian Bentley (born 13 July 1993) is an English professional footballer who plays as a goalkeeper for Premier League club Coventry City. He has played in the English Football League for Southend United, Brentford and Bristol City.

== Career ==
=== Southend United ===
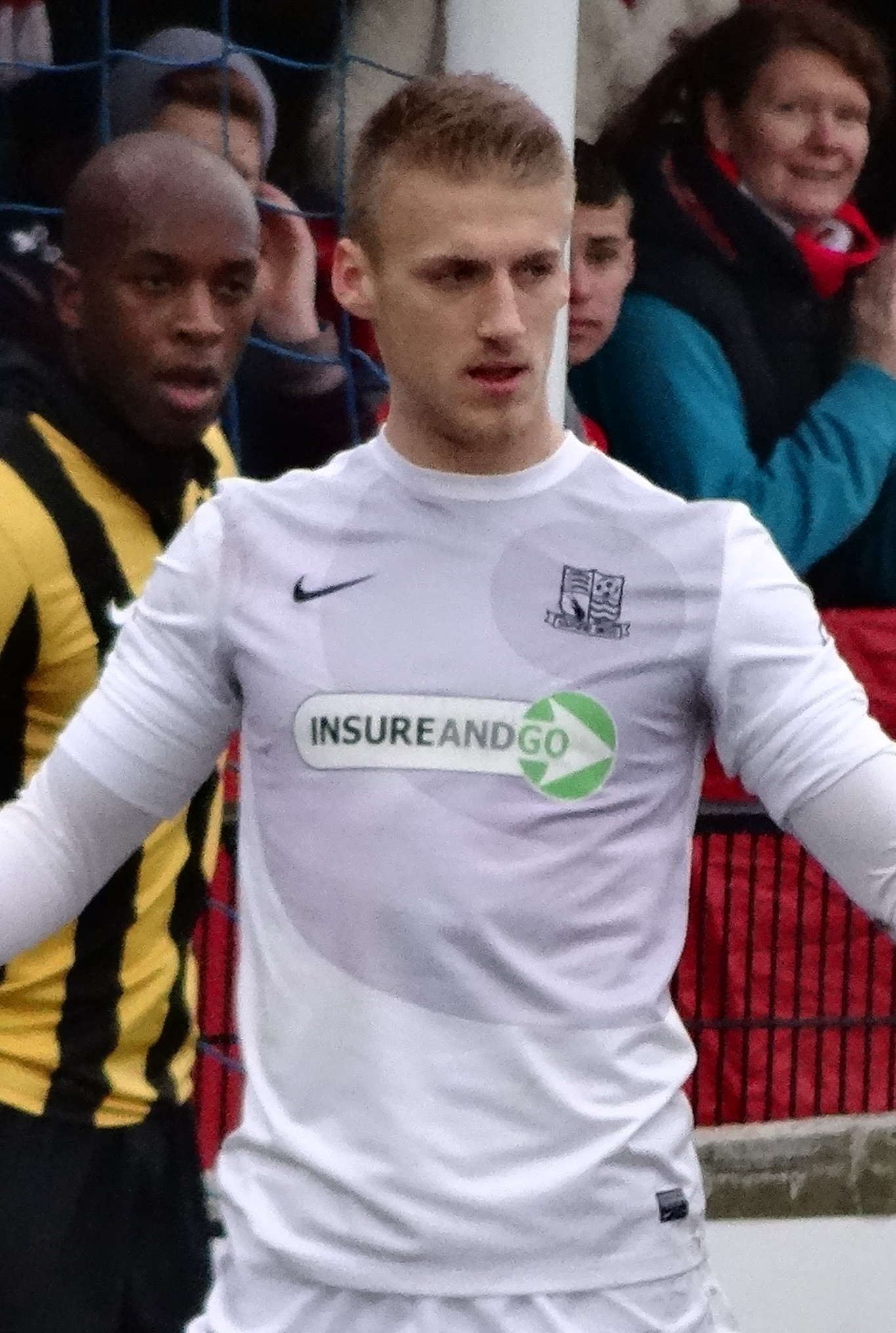
Bentley playing for Southend United in 2014

Bentley was born in Basildon, Essex, and began his career as a center-back with hometown club Hutton Medway. An Arsenal scout witnessed a one-off appearance as a goalkeeper, and brought Bentley to the club's academy at age eight. He was released in 2008 and quickly signed for Southend United, with whom he started his apprenticeship in March 2009. Bentley was sent out on loan to Conference South club Braintree Town, initially to cover one match. However, he ended up staying and made two appearances for the club against Welling United and Dover Athletic. He signed his first professional contract in the summer of 2011 on a two-year deal. He made his first-team debut for the Shrimpers on 22 October 2011 in a 4–1 win over Torquay United, replacing the injured Glenn Morris in the second half.

After an injury to first-choice Southend United goalkeeper Paul Smith, Bentley was called upon to deputise and played in his first run of first-team matches in the 2012–13 season, making his full debut for Southend on 22 September 2012 against Exeter City, a match Southend won 2–1. Bentley went on to play further matches against Plymouth and Burton Albion before Paul Smith returned to full fitness.

Bentley continued to play in cup matches and developed a reputation as a good penalty saver. As a consequence, with a Football League Trophy Southern Area semi-final against Oxford United seemingly heading to Penalties, Southend manager Paul Sturrock substituted starting goalkeeper Paul Smith for Bentley in the 90th minute, provoking an angry reaction from Smith. Bentley went on to save Alfie Potter's spot kick, and Southend won 5–3 on penalties, progressing to the Southern area final. Sturrock justified the decision, saying, "Bentley has been fantastic at penalties all his career, and it worked; he saved one."

==== 2013–14 season ====
Bentley kept 19 clean sheets during the 2013–14 season. His impressive performances linked him with a move to Leeds United, with Leeds' manager Brian McDermott watching Bentley in Southend's 3–0 win against Rochdale on Good Friday. After being linked with a move to Leeds, Bentley said he would not let speculation about a potential move affect his performances.

==== 2014–15 season ====
Over the summer of 2014, Bentley was linked with moves to Premier League clubs, but eventually remained at Southend. Early in the following season, he was considered for the England U21s; however, he was not selected.

In the 2014–15 season, Bentley broke Mervyn Cawston's club record of 10 consecutive home clean sheets with 12 in a row between October and April.

Southend made it to the play-off final at Wembley Stadium, where they played Wycombe Wanderers. The match was goalless after 90 minutes; however, 5 minutes into extra time, Wycombe took the lead through an own goal from Bentley. A free kick from Joe Jacobson hit the crossbar before rebounding off the diving Bentley's back into the goal. However, with 20 seconds remaining, Southend forced a penalty shoot-out, in which Bentley was the hero, saving penalties from Matt Bloomfield and Sam Wood, and Southend won promotion to League One.

The season was full of accolades for Bentley, who won all three of the club's end-of-season awards – supporters' player, players' player, and community player of the year. He was named Football League Young Player of the Month for April 2015 and made the League Two PFA Team of the Year alongside teammate Ben Coker.

==== 2015–16 season ====
In the summer 2015 transfer window, Bentley attracted three bids from Queens Park Rangers, with the 3rd and final offer being £1.25m, which Southend chairman Ron Martin rejected.

On 31 August 2015, Bentley produced a man-of-the-match performance away at Coventry City in a 2–2 draw, including a penalty save. Bentley remained a Southend United player when the transfer window closed on 1 September.

=== Brentford ===
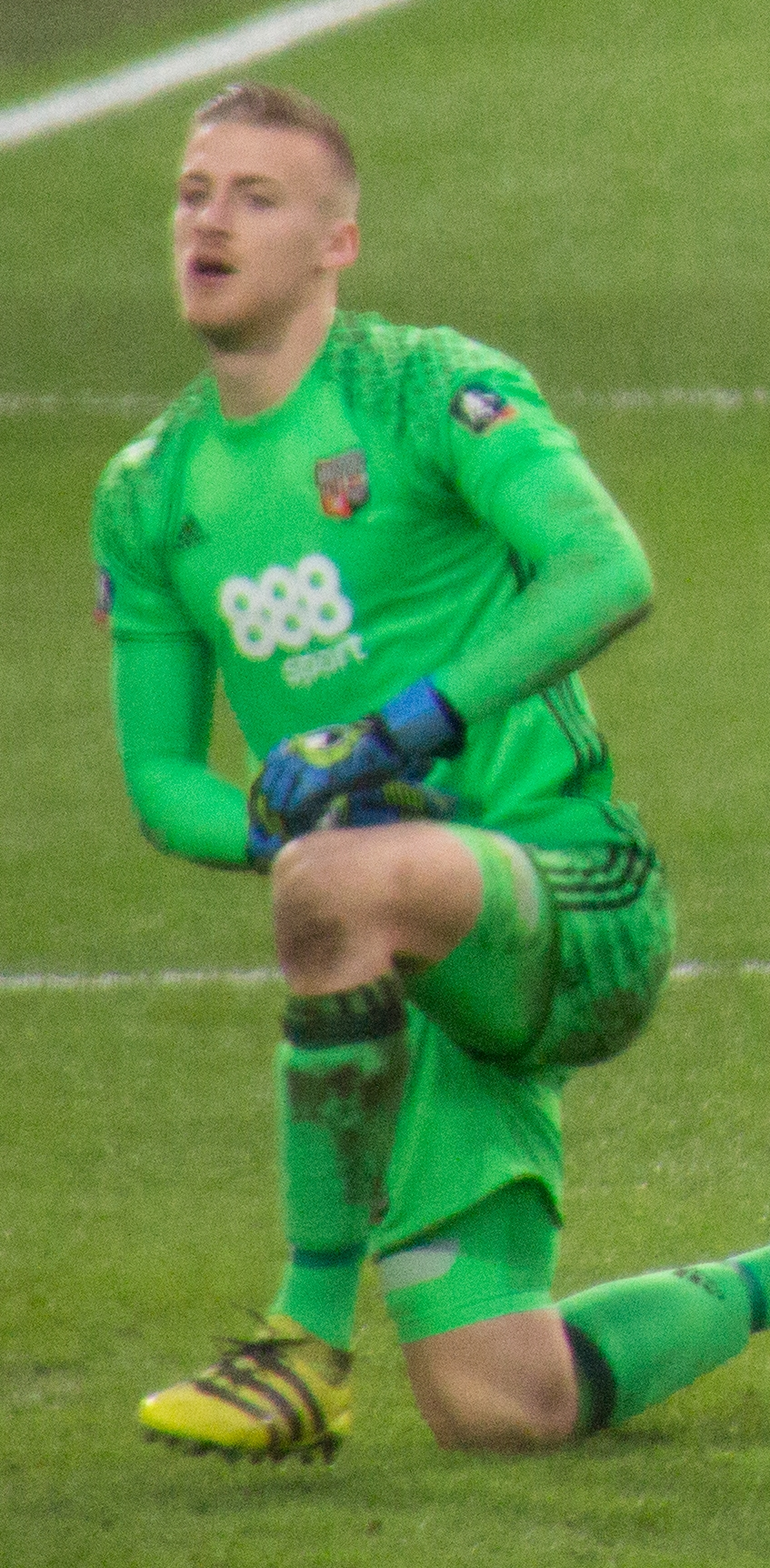
Bentley playing for Brentford in 2017.

On 1 July 2016, Bentley signed for Championship club Brentford on a four-year contract with a compensation fee of £1.1 million. The fee would rise if Bentley reaches a certain number of appearances.

=== Bristol City ===
Bentley signed for Bristol City on 28 June 2019 on a four-year contract for an undisclosed fee. During his time at Bristol City, manager Nigel Pearson appointed him club captain.

=== Wolverhampton Wanderers ===
Bentley signed a two-and-a-half-year contract with Premier League club Wolverhampton Wanderers on 25 January 2023 for an undisclosed fee. He made his debut on 13 May in a 2–0 defeat away to Manchester United in the 2022–23 Premier League. He made his home debut the following weekend in a 1–1 draw with Everton. On 20 April 2025, Bentley kept a clean sheet at Old Trafford after a 0–1 away win at Manchester United.

== Career statistics ==
As of match played 16 September 2026

Appearances and goals by club, season and competition
Club	Season	League			FA Cup		League Cup		Other		Total	
Club	Season	Division	Apps	Goals	Apps	Goals	Apps	Goals	Apps	Goals	Apps	Goals
Southend United	2009–10	League One	0	0	0	0	0	0	0	0	0	0
Southend United	2010–11	League Two	0	0	0	0	0	0	0	0	0	0
Southend United	2011–12	League Two	1	0	0	0	0	0	0	0	1	0
Southend United	2012–13	League Two	9	0	1	0	0	0	1 (Note: Appearance(s) in Football League Trophy)	0	11	0
Southend United	2013–14	League Two	46	0	4	0	1	0	2 (Note: Appearances in League Two play-offs)	0	53	0
Southend United	2014–15	League Two	42	0	1	0	0	0	4 (Note: One appearance in Football League Trophy, three appearances in League Two play-offs)	0	47	0
Southend United	2015–16	League One	43	0	1	0	1	0	3	0	48	0
Southend United	Total		141	0	7	0	2	0	10	0	160	0
Braintree Town (loan)	2010–11	Conference South	2	0	—		—		—		2	0
Brentford	2016–17	Championship	45	0	2	0	0	0	—		47	0
Brentford	2017–18	Championship	45	0	0	0	0	0	—		45	0
Brentford	2018–19	Championship	33	0	0	0	0	0	—		33	0
Brentford	Total		123	0	2	0	0	0	—		125	0
Bristol City	2019–20	Championship	43	0	1	0	1	0	—		45	0
Bristol City	2020–21	Championship	43	0	1	0	1	0	—		45	0
Bristol City	2021–22	Championship	38	0	0	0	0	0	—		38	0
Bristol City	2022–23	Championship	13	0	0	0	2	0	—		15	0
Bristol City	Total		137	0	2	0	4	0	—		143	0
Wolverhampton Wanderers	2022–23	Premier League	2	0	—		—		—		2	0
Wolverhampton Wanderers	2023–24	Premier League	5	0	0	0	2	0	—		7	0
Wolverhampton Wanderers	2024–25	Premier League	2	0	0	0	1	0	—		3	0
Wolverhampton Wanderers	2025–26	Premier League	3	0	0	0	0	0	—		3	0
Wolverhampton Wanderers	2026–27	Championship	1	0	—		1	0	–		1	0
Wolverhampton Wanderers	Total		13	0	0	0	4	0	—		17	0
Coventry City	2026–27	Premier League	0	0	0	0	2	0	—		2	0
Career total			416	0	11	0	12	0	10	0	449	0

== Honours ==
Southend United

- Football League Two play-offs: 2015
- Football League Trophy runner-up: 2012–13

Individual

- Football League Young Player of the Month: February 2015
- Southend United Player of the Year: 2014–15
- Southend United Players' Player of the Year: 2014–15
- Southend United Community Player of the Year: 2014–15
- PFA Team of the Year: 2014–15 League Two
- Bristol City Player of the Year: 2020–21
