= Barry Richardson (English footballer) =

English footballer and coach

Personal information
- Full name: Barry Richardson
- Date of birth: 5 August 1969 (age 57)
- Place of birth: Wallsend, England
- Height: 6 ft 1 in (1.85 m)
- Position: Goalkeeper

Team information
- Current team: Doncaster Rovers (first-team coach)

Youth career
- Wallsend Boys Club

Senior career*
Years	Team	Apps	(Gls)
1988–1989	Sunderland	0	(0)
1988–1989	→ Seaham Red Star (loan)		
1989–1991	Scarborough	30	(0)
1991	Stockport County	0	(0)
1991–1994	Northampton Town	140	(0)
1994–1995	Preston North End	34	(0)
1995–2000	Lincoln City	149	(0)
1999	→ Mansfield Town (loan)	8	(0)
2000	→ Sheffield Wednesday (loan)	0	(0)
2000–2001	Doncaster Rovers	62	(0)
2001–2003	Halifax Town	24	(0)
2003–2004	Gainsborough Trinity		
2004–2008	Doncaster Rovers	2	(0)
2008–2009	Nottingham Forest	0	(0)
2009–2010	Cheltenham Town	0	(0)
2010–2013	Peterborough United	0	(0)
2014–2018	Wycombe Wanderers	1	(0)
Total		450	(0)
- * Club domestic league appearances and goals

Barry Richardson (born 5 August 1969) is an English football coach and former professional footballer. He is currently first-team coach at Doncaster Rovers.

As a player, he was a goalkeeper who notably played in the Football League with lengthy spells at both Northampton Town and Lincoln City. He also played professionally for Scarborough, Preston North End, Mansfield Town and Doncaster Rovers before dropping into Non-League with Halifax Town and Gainsborough Trinity. Between 2004 and 2018 he was registered as a back-up player for teams he coached.

== Playing career ==
He played for Sunderland, Seaham Red Star (loan), Scarborough, Stockport County, Northampton Town, Preston North End, Lincoln City, Mansfield Town (loan) Sheffield Wednesday (loan), Doncaster Rovers (1st spell), Gainsborough Trinity, Halifax Town, Doncaster Rovers (2nd spell), Nottingham Forest and Wycombe Wanderers.

== Coaching career ==
Richardson has been the goalkeeping coach at Doncaster Rovers, Nottingham Forest, Cheltenham Town, Peterborough United, Wycombe Wanderers and Hull City.

Richardson returned to Doncaster Rovers as goalkeeping coach in the summer of 2005. On 11 January 2008 he departed Rovers to succeed David Watson as the goalkeeping coach at Nottingham Forest.

Rejoining Forest, where he had coached the academy goalkeepers in the 2004–05 season, he was also registered as a player being allocated (in line with his age) the squad number 38. He would be an unused substitute goalkeeper on occasions for Forest, wearing the squad number 39 in the 2008–09 season, the last time being on 3 January 2009 when Forest beat Manchester City 3–0 in the FA Cup 3rd Round. He departed the club following the appointment of Billy Davies as manager, rejecting an alternative role with the club after Davies appointed Pete Williams as goalkeeping coach.

He joined Cheltenham Town as goalkeeping coach at the start of the 2009–10 season whilst also acting as back-up goalkeeper. He was sent off as an unused substitute in a match against Lincoln City on 14 November 2009. He parted company with the club on 21 January 2010 following the new manager Mark Yates deciding to operate without a goalkeeping coach for the remainder of the 2009–10 season.

On 3 February 2010 he signed a two-and-a-half-year contract to become player-goalkeeping coach at Peterborough United . He was given the number 37 shirt and appeared as an unused substitute for the game against Blackpool on 17 April 2010 due to the absence of number 1 Joe Lewis and the number 30 shirt for the match against Huddersfield in the play-off final, where again he was on the bench due to the absence of Lewis. Richardson left this role by mutual consent on 21 January 2013.

On 30 January 2014 it was reported that Richardson had signed as the goalkeeping coach for Wycombe Wanderers; he also registered as a non-contract player with the squad number 44.

During the 2014–15 season, having changed his squad number to 13, he was named as a substitute on thirty-five occasions for Wycombe but did not make a first-team appearance. At the age of 46, he played a competitive game for the first time in over 8 years on 30 January 2016, after an injury to first-choice goalkeeper Alex Lynch during a match against Plymouth Argyle, and kept a clean sheet in a 1–0 victory – the first time Plymouth had failed to score at home that season.

== Coaching career ==
On 26 January 2018, Richardson was appointed goalkeeping coach for Hull City. He parted company with the club in June 2024.

In May 2025, Richardson returned to former club Doncaster Rovers in the role of first-team coach, focusing on outfield coaching.

== Honours ==
Peterborough United

- Football League One play-offs: 2011
