= Max Kretzschmar =

English footballer (born 1993)

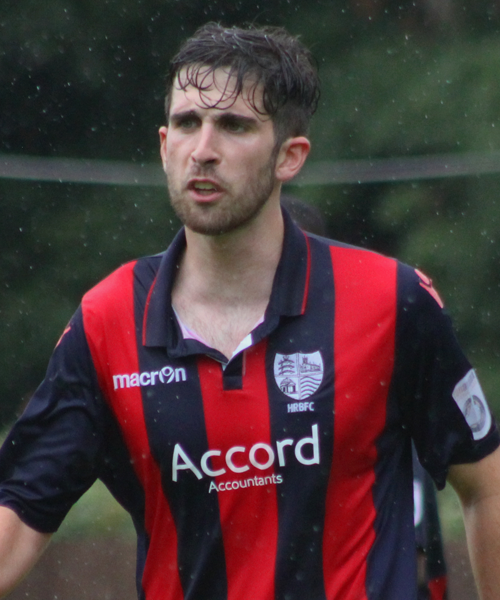
- Kretzschmar playing for Hampton & Richmond Borough

Personal information
- Full name: Max Alexander Kretzschmar
- Date of birth: 12 October 1993 (age 33)
- Place of birth: Kingston upon Thames, England
- Height: 1.74 m (5 ft 8 1/2 in)
- Position: Midfielder

Team information
- Current team: Hampton & Richmond Borough (player/assistant manager)
- Number: 10

Youth career
- 2000–2003: Molesey Juniors
- 2003–2007: Southampton
- 2007–2012: Wycombe Wanderers

Senior career*
Years	Team	Apps	(Gls)
2012–2016	Wycombe Wanderers	73	(8)
2016–2017	Woking	22	(3)
2017–2018	Hampton & Richmond Borough	39	(14)
2018–2022	Woking	121	(35)
2022–2025	Wealdstone	118	(21)
2025–	Hampton & Richmond Borough	18	(3)
- * Club domestic league appearances and goals as of 10:56, 13 March 2026 (UTC)

Max Alexander Kretzschmar (born 12 October 1993) is an English professional footballer who plays for National League South club Hampton & Richmond Borough where he holds the role of player/assistant manager.

== Youth career ==
Kretzschmar started at Molesey Juniors at aged 7 before being scouted by Southampton in 2003.

== Club career ==
=== Wycombe Wanderers ===
Prior to his career at Wycombe Wanderers, Kretzschmar played for Southampton between the ages of 10 and 14, before being released. He went onto make his professional debut in a 1–0 victory against Morecambe on 3 August 2013. Before even making a league start, Kretzschmar opened his goal account by scoring both goals for Wycombe in their 2–1 win at Hartlepool United on 7 September 2013, having come on at half time for Nick Arnold.

On 9 May 2016, it was announced that Kretzschmar would leave the club upon the expiry of his contract on 30 June 2016, along with teammates; Gozie Ugwu, Alex Lynch and Ryan Sellers.

=== Woking ===
On 15 July 2016, Kretzschmar joined National League side Woking on a one-year deal.

On 6 August 2016, Kretzschmar made his Woking debut in a 3–1 home defeat against Lincoln City, replacing Ben Gordon in the 78th minute. On 20 August 2016, Kretzschmar was handed his first Woking start by manager Garry Hill in a 3–1 home defeat against Dagenham & Redbridge, before being replaced by Gozie Ugwu in the 73rd minute. On 1 January 2017, Kretzschmar scored his first Woking goal in a 2–1 home defeat against local rivals Aldershot Town, equalizing two minutes after Scott Rendell had given the visitors the lead. On 28 February 2017, Kretzschmar scored Woking's winner in their 1–0 victory against National League promotion hopefuls Dover Athletic, netting into an open goal after academy graduate, Charlie Carter had squared the ball. On the final day of the 2016–17 campaign, Kretzschmar scored in Woking's 1–1 draw with Dagenham & Redbridge, a goal which saw the Cards survival in the National League confirmed.

On 23 May 2017, it was announced that Kretzschmar would leave Woking upon the expiry of his current deal in June 2017.

=== Hampton & Richmond Borough ===
On 18 June 2017, following his release from Woking, Kretzschmar joined National League South side Hampton & Richmond Borough.

On the opening day of the campaign, Kretzschmar made his Hampton & Richmond debut during their 1–1 away draw with East Thurrock United, playing the full 90 minutes. A week later, he scored his first goal for the club during their 1–1 draw against Eastbourne Borough, curling home a free-kick in the 41st minute. In the month of September, Kretzschmar continued his impressive form, netting four times in five league games. On 2 December 2017, Kretzschmar netted his tenth goal in all competitions during Hampton & Richmond's league tie against Weston-super-Mare, completing the Beavers' comeback in the 79th minute to secure a 2–1 victory. On 6 May 2018, during Hampton & Richmond's National League South play-off campaign, Kretzschmar scored the winning goal during their semi-final fixture against Chelmsford City, converting a penalty in the 1–0 win. During their play-off final against Braintree Town, Kretzschmar scored the opening goal 1–1 draw, before Reece Grant equalised for Town before the break. Braintree went onto win 4–3 on penalties after extra time and were in turn, promoted back to the National League.

=== Return to Woking ===
On 13 July 2018, Kretzschmar made his return to Woking under previous manager, Alan Dowson following his switch from Hampton. On the opening day of the 2018–19 campaign, Kretzschmar marked his Woking return with the winner in their 1–0 away victory over East Thurrock United, converting a penalty with seconds remaining. Kretzschmar went onto continue his impressive scoring streak, with goals against Oxford City, Hemel Hempstead Town, Eastbourne Borough and a crucial penalty against promotion rivals, Billericay Town. On 14 November 2018, he netted his 10th and 11th goals of the season, during a thrilling 4–3 encounter with Gloucester City. On 5 May 2019, during Woking's play-off semi final against Wealdstone, Kretzschmar netted a crucial equaliser in the 86th minute and the Cards eventually went onto win the game 3–2, courtesy of a last minute effort from Jake Hyde. A week later, Kretzschmar was part of the side that triumphed over Welling United in the National League South play-off final to secure promotion back to the National League at the first time of asking.

On 4 July 2019, Kretzschmar signed a new one-year deal with the Cards, following their promotion back to the National League. On 19 October 2019, Kretzschmar netted his first goal of the campaign during a 1–1 away draw with Ebbsfleet United in their FA Cup fourth round qualifying tie, converting a 91st-minute penalty to take the fixture to a replay, which the Cards eventually lost 1–0. He went onto score on three more occasions, collating twenty-seven appearances in all competitions, before the campaign was curtailed due to the COVID-19 pandemic.

On 9 July 2020, Kretzschmar secured a new one-year deal with the club following a disrupted 2019–20 campaign. On 3 October 2020, he went onto net his first goal of the season, scoring the equaliser during a 2–1 home victory over Solihull Moors. Following this, Kretzschmar went onto enjoy his most successful campaign in the National League to date, scoring seven goals in thirty-one appearances, with an additional three goals in cup competitions, taking his tally to ten for the season.

Ahead of the 2021–22 campaign, Kretzschmar penned a further one-year deal and went onto net a decisive brace in the Cards' opening fixture of the season against Wealdstone, in which the Surrey-based side were victorious, 2–1. After finishing the campaign as the club's top joint scorer alongside Inih Effiong and Tahvon Campbell with 13 goals to his name, Kretzschmar opted to leave the club at the end of his contract in June. During his second spell back at Kingfield, he collated 142 appearances, scoring 41 goals.

=== Wealdstone ===
On 8 July 2022, Kretzschmar signed for fellow National League side Wealdstone. Kretzschmar made his Wealdstone debut on 6 August 2022, getting two assists in a 3–2 win over Bromley. On 4 September 2022, he scored his first goal for the club, converting a penalty in a 1–1 draw against his former side Woking. Kretzschmar made 31 appearances in his first season at the club, scoring six times. In July 2023 it was announced that he had signed a one-year contract extension.

Kretzschmar scored his first goal of the 2023–24 season on the opening day, scoring a penalty to equalise in an eventual 2–1 win over York City. He would go on to score ten times, finishing the season as Wealdstone's joint top scorer alongside Sean Adarkwa as they ended the season in 16th. He signed a further one-year contract extension in May 2024. Kretzschmar scored 4 times in 44 games in 2024–25 as Wealdstone finished 20th in the National League, registering two assists in the 3–1 win over FC Halifax Town that secured their survival on the final day of the season.

In June 2025, Wealdstone announced that Kretzschmar remained under contract for the 2025–26 season, ahead of which he was appointed as one of the club's vice-captains..

In December 2025, Wealdstone announced that Kretzschmar had been released by the club in order to take up an opportunity elsewhere.

=== Return to Hampton & Richmond Borough ===
On the day he confirmed his exit from Wealdstone, Kretzschmar agreed to rejoin Hampton & Richmond Borough as a player/assistant manager, reuniting with former manager Alan Dowson in the process.

== Personal life ==
Kretzschmar was educated at Hampton School in south west London.

== Career statistics ==
As of match played 25 April 2026

Appearances and goals by club, season and competition
Club	Season	League			FA Cup		League Cup		Other		Total	
Club	Season	Division	Apps	Goals	Apps	Goals	Apps	Goals	Apps	Goals	Apps	Goals
Wycombe Wanderers	2013–14	League Two	35	6	2	0	1	0	3 (Note: Appearance(s) in Football League Trophy)	0	41	6
Wycombe Wanderers	2014–15	League Two	16	0	2	0	1	0	1	0	20	0
Wycombe Wanderers	2015–16	League Two	22	2	1	1	0	0	1	0	24	3
Wycombe Wanderers	Total		73	8	5	1	2	0	5	0	85	9
Woking	2016–17	National League	22	3	0	0	—		0	0	22	3
Hampton & Richmond Borough	2017–18	National League South	39	14	3	0	—		6 (Note: Three appearances and four goals in FA Trophy, three appearances and two goals in National League South play-offs)	6	48	20
Woking	2018–19	National League South	32	13	5	1	—		5 (Note: Three appearances in FA Trophy, two appearances and one goal in National League South play-offs)	1	42	15
Woking	2019–20	National League	24	2	2	1	—		1 (Note: Appearance(s) in FA Trophy)	1	27	4
Woking	2020–21	National League	31	7	2	2	—		4	1	37	10
Woking	2021–22	National League	34	13	1	0	—		1	0	36	13
Woking	Total		121	35	10	4	—		11	2	142	41
Wealdstone	2022–23	National League	30	6	0	0	—		1 (Note: Appearance in Middlesex Senior Cup)	0	31	6
Wealdstone	2023–24	National League	36	8	1	1	—		3	1	40	10
Wealdstone	2024–25	National League	39	3	3	1	—		2 (Note: Includes FA Trophy and National League Cup)	0	44	4
Wealdstone	2025–26	National League	13	4	1	0	—		2 (Note: Appearances in National League Cup)	1	16	5
Wealdstone	Total		118	21	5	2	—		8	2	131	25
Hampton & Richmond Borough	2025–26	National League South	18	3	—		—		—		18	3
Career total			391	84	23	7	2	0	30	11	446	96
