= Ryan Sellers =

English footballer (born 1994)

Personal information
- Full name: Ryan James Sellers
- Date of birth: 13 October 1994 (age 32)
- Place of birth: Mill Hill, England
- Height: 5 ft 11 in (1.80 m)
- Position: Defender

Team information
- Current team: Welwyn Garden City

Youth career
- 2010–2013: Wingate & Finchley
- 2013: Barnet

Senior career*
Years	Team	Apps	(Gls)
2013	Wingate & Finchley		
2013	→ London Lions (loan)	2	(1)
2014–2015	Bolton Wanderers	0	(0)
2015–2016	Wycombe Wanderers	15	(0)
2016–2017	Wingate & Finchley	31	(0)
2017–2018	Wealdstone	36	(3)
2018–2019	FC Halifax Town	32	(0)
2019–2020	Wealdstone	2	(0)
2019	→ Bedford Town (loan)	2	(0)
2020–2021	Hemel Hempstead Town	3	(1)
2021	Wingate & Finchley	0	(0)
2022	London Colney	1	(0)
2022–2024	Wingate & Finchley	13	(0)
2024-	Welwyn Garden City	0	(0)
- * Club domestic league appearances and goals as of 16:48, 2 May 2023 (UTC)

Ryan James Sellers (born 13 October 1994) is an English former professional footballer who plays for Welwyn Garden City. He previously played for Bolton Wanderers, Wycombe Wanderers, Wingate & Finchley, FC Halifax Town, Wealdstone and Hemel Hempstead Town.

== Club career ==
Sellers started his career with Wingate & Finchley, joining aged 13 before a six-month spell at Barnet before eventually returning to Wingate & Finchley towards the conclusion of the 2012–13 campaign, in which he subsequently broke into the first-team. He also enjoyed a brief loan spell with London Lions during his second stint back at Wingate. In November 2013, Sellers was one of six youngsters chosen to win a place at the famed Nike Academy, where he spent the remainder of the 2013–14 campaign before earning a move to Football League side, Bolton Wanderers in July 2014.

Sellers joined League Two side Wycombe Wanderers in June 2015. He made his professional debut on 8 August 2015 in a 3–0 victory against York City. On 9 May 2016, it was announced that Sellers would leave the club upon the expiry of his contract on 30 June 2016.

In August 2016, after trials with numerous National League sides including Woking, Sellers re-joined his boyhood club Wingate & Finchley. On 13 August 2016, Sellers made his Wingate & Finchley return in a 3–0 away defeat against Tonbridge Angels, featuring for the full 90 minutes.

On 23 February 2017, Sellers joined National League South side Wealdstone. After an eighteen-month spell with Wealdstone, Sellers agreed to join National League side FC Halifax Town on a one-year deal in July 2018. In May 2019, Sellers returned to Wealdstone.

Following a spell back at Wealdstone, Sellers subsequently went onto feature for Hemel Hempstead Town, a return to Wingate & Finchley and London Colney. Sellers returned to Wingate & Finchley for the fourth time in October 2022.

In July 2024, Sellers signed for Welwyn Garden City.

== Career statistics ==
As of match played 8 April 2023

Appearances and goals by club, season and competition
Club	Season	League			FA Cup		EFL Cup		Other		Total	
Club	Season	Division	Apps	Goals	Apps	Goals	Apps	Goals	Apps	Goals	Apps	Goals
Wingate & Finchley	2012–13	Isthmian League Premier Division	No data currently available									
Wingate & Finchley	2013–14	Isthmian League Premier Division	No data currently available									
London Lions (loan)	2013–14	Spartan South Midlands League Premier Division	2	1	—		—		1 (Note: Appearance in the FA Vase)	0	3	1
Bolton Wanderers	2014–15	Championship	0	0	0	0	0	0	0	0	0	0
Wycombe Wanderers	2015–16	League Two	15	0	0	0	1	0	1 (Note: Appearance in the Football League Trophy)	0	17	0
Wingate & Finchley	2016–17	Isthmian League Premier Division	31	0	1	0	—		6 (Note: One appearance in the Alan Turvey Trophy, five in the FA Trophy)	0	38	0
Wealdstone	2016–17	National League South	11	0	—		—		—		11	0
Wealdstone	2017–18	National League South	25	3	2	0	—		5 (Note: Appearances in the FA Trophy)	0	32	3
Wealdstone	Total		36	3	2	0	—		5	0	43	3
FC Halifax Town	2018–19	National League	23	0	5	0	—		2	0	30	0
Wealdstone	2019–20	National League South	2	0	0	0	—		0	0	2	0
Bedford Town (loan)	2019–20	Southern League Division One Central	2	0	—		—		—		2	0
Hemel Hempstead Town	2020–21	National League South	3	1	0	0	—		2	0	5	1
Wingate & Finchley	2021–22	Isthmian League Premier Division	0	0	0	0	—		0	0	0	0
London Colney	2021–22	Spartan South Midlands League Premier Division	1	0	—		—		—		1	0
Wingate & Finchley	2022–23	Isthmian League Premier Division	13	0	—		—		0	0	13	0
Career total			128	5	8	0	1	0	17	0	154	5
