= Marcus Bean =

Footballer (born 1984)

Personal information
- Full name: Marcus Tristan Bean
- Date of birth: 2 January 1984 (age 42)
- Place of birth: Hammersmith, England
- Height: 1.80 m (5 ft 11 in)
- Position: Midfielder

Youth career
- 1995–2002: Queens Park Rangers

Senior career*
Years	Team	Apps	(Gls)
2002–2006	Queens Park Rangers	67	(2)
2005	→ Swansea City (loan)	8	(0)
2005	→ Swansea City (loan)	9	(1)
2006–2008	Blackpool	23	(1)
2007	→ Rotherham United (loan)	12	(1)
2008–2012	Brentford	144	(14)
2012–2015	Colchester United	69	(5)
2014–2015	→ Portsmouth (loan)	6	(1)
2015–2019	Wycombe Wanderers	106	(3)
Total		444	(28)

International career
2011	Jamaica	1	(0)
- * Club domestic league appearances and goals

Marcus Tristan Bean (born 2 January 1984) is a former professional footballer who played as a midfielder, most notably for Brentford and Wycombe Wanderers in the English Football League. Born in England, he represented Jamaica at international level.

== Club career ==
=== Early career ===
Born in Hammersmith, London, Bean started his youth career at local club St Joseph's, where he excelled playing his role in centre midfield, before deciding on moving on to successful youth club Northolt Villa. He captained the club to multiple trophies with dynamic midfield displays, regularly winning player of the season awards before eventually being scouted and moving to his first professional club, Queens Park Rangers at eleven years old.

=== Queens Park Rangers ===
Coming up through the youth ranks with QPR, Bean made his debut as a substitute at Wycombe in August 2002 only to suffer the ignominy of a second half red card in a game that saw four players receive their marching orders. His first start came in a comprehensive 4–0 victory at Mansfield a fortnight later and although he made only eight league and cup appearances throughout 2002–03, his obvious talent and composure mark him out as a great prospect for the future.

Bean was a member of the Second Division promotion winning squad of 2003–04 and saw him awarded Rangers' Young Player of the Year, an accolade he earned with his energetic style and break-up play, which allowed the more skilled-of-foot to create the play which saw Rangers' promoted to the Championship.

After limited chances to play first team football came his way, Bean took up two loan spells to Swansea during 2005. He made 17 league appearances for the Swans in both stints scoring one goal.

=== Blackpool ===
Bean did not make a first-team appearance for Blackpool between the Seasiders' 4–2 win over Aldershot in the third round of the FA Cup on 6 January 2007 and their 3–1 league victory at Bradford City on 26 March, and joined Rotherham United on a one-month loan on 9 August 2007. The loan was extended until the end of October, and "Beano" scored his first goal for the Millers in their 3–2 win over Mansfield Town.

It was a frustrating second season with Blackpool for Bean, after helping them avoid relegation in his first and assisting them in promotion to the championship in his second, although playing a limited number of games and considering retiring from football. On 7 May 2008, Bean was released by Blackpool.

=== Brentford ===
Brentford signed Bean in the summer of 2008 after he was released by Blackpool. He was part of the Brentford squad that won the League Two championship in 2008–09 and scored 9 goals from midfield. He notched up his 100th Football League appearance for Brentford on the final day of the 2010–11 season and passed 150 appearances for The Bees in all competitions. His form at the start of the 2011–12 season earned him a call-up to the Jamaican national squad. Following his retirement from football in 2019, Bean returned to Brentford as a scout.

=== Colchester United ===
On 8 June 2012, Bean signed for Colchester United on a three-year deal following his release from Brentford. He made his debut for the Essex club on 18 August 2012 in a 0–0 League One draw with Preston North End He scored his first goal for Colchester on 22 October 2013 in a 1–1 draw with Shrewsbury Town at the New Meadow. He netted the opening goal in a 2–2 draw at his former club Rotherham on 2 November for his second goal, and scored his third for the season in a 4–2 win against Carlisle United at Brunton Park on 18 January 2014. Bean's scoring form continued by grabbing a consolation goal as Colchester fell to a 2–1 defeat at Leyton Orient on 1 March. On 26 April, he scored the opening goal in a 4–1 win against his former club, who were already promoted from League One, in a result that meant that Colchester were all but safe from relegation.

==== Portsmouth loan ====
On 21 November 2014 Bean joined League Two club Portsmouth on loan until 3 January 2015. He made his debut on 22 November in Pompey's 3–0 home win over Morecambe. He scored his first goal for Portsmouth in his third game for the club, netting a curling effort in a 3–2 defeat to Accrington Stanley on 13 December.

=== Wycombe Wanderers ===
On 9 January 2015, he signed for League 2 club Wycombe Wanderers on an 18-month contract after being released by Colchester United. Bean had just returned to Colchester having had a short loan spell at fellow League 2 club Portsmouth. Portsmouth had also expressed an interest in signing Bean but only on a short-term basis. Bean opted for Wycombe and linking up again with Gareth Ainsworth, whom he knows from his QPR days. He was released by Wycombe at the end of the 2018–19 season. He announced his retirement in July 2019.

== International career ==
Bean made a single appearance for Jamaica in a 2–1 game against Honduras in October 2011. He came on as a substitute with 15 minutes to go as the "Reggae Boyz" recorded a fifth straight defeat .

== Career statistics ==
=== Club ===
Appearances and goals by club, season and competition
Club	Season	League			FA Cup		League Cup		Other		Total	
Club	Season	Division	Apps	Goals	Apps	Goals	Apps	Goals	Apps	Goals	Apps	Goals
Queens Park Rangers	2002–03	Second Division	7	0	0	0	0	0	1 (Note: Appearance(s) in Football League Trophy)	0	8	0
Queens Park Rangers	2003–04	Second Division	31	1	1	0	1	0	3	0	36	1
Queens Park Rangers	2004–05	Championship	20	1	1	0	1	0	―		22	1
Queens Park Rangers	2005–06	Championship	9	0	0	0	1	0	―		10	0
Queens Park Rangers	Total		67	2	2	0	3	0	4	0	76	2
Swansea City (loan)	2004–05	League Two	8	0	―		―		―		8	0
Swansea City (loan)	2005–06	League One	9	1	0	0	―		0	0	9	1
Swansea City (loan)	Total		17	1	0	0	0	0	0	0	17	1
Blackpool	2005–06	League One	17	1	―		―		―		17	1
Blackpool	2006–07	League One	6	0	2	0	1	0	1	0	10	0
Blackpool	2007–08	Championship	0	0	0	0	0	0	―		0	0
Blackpool	Total		23	1	2	0	1	0	1	0	27	1
Rotherham United (loan)	2007–08	League Two	12	1	―		0	0	2	0	14	1
Brentford	2008–09	League Two	44	9	2	0	1	0	1	0	48	9
Brentford	2009–10	League One	31	0	4	0	0	0	1	0	36	0
Brentford	2010–11	League One	37	3	1	0	4	1	5	0	47	4
Brentford	2011–12	League One	32	2	1	0	1	0	3	0	37	2
Brentford	Total		144	14	8	0	6	1	10	0	168	15
Colchester United	2012–13	League One	31	0	1	0	0	0	1	0	33	0
Colchester United	2013–14	League One	35	5	1	0	0	0	0	0	36	5
Colchester United	2014–15	League One	3	0	0	0	1	0	0	0	4	0
Colchester United	Total		69	5	2	0	1	0	1	0	73	5
Portsmouth (loan)	2014–15	League Two	6	1	―		―		―		6	1
Wycombe Wanderers	2014–15	League Two	17	0	0	0	0	0	3 (Note: Appearances in League Two play-offs)	0	20	0
Wycombe Wanderers	2015–16	League Two	30	0	1	0	1	0	0	0	32	0
Wycombe Wanderers	2016–17	League Two	19	0	2	0	0	0	6 (Note: Appearances in EFL Trophy)	0	27	0
Wycombe Wanderers	2017–18	League Two	31	2	2	0	1	0	2	0	36	2
Wycombe Wanderers	2018–19	League One	9	1	1	0	1	0	3	0	14	1
Wycombe Wanderers	Total		106	3	6	0	3	0	14	0	129	3
Career total			444	28	20	0	14	1	32	0	510	29

=== International ===
Appearances and goals by national team and year
National team	Year	Apps	Goals
Jamaica	2011	1	0
Total		1	0

== Honours ==
Queens Park Rangers

- Football League Second Division second-place promotion: 2003–04

Blackpool

- Football League One play-offs: 2007

Brentford

- Football League Two: 2008–09
- Football League Trophy runner-up: 2010–11

Wycombe Wanderers

- EFL League Two third-place promotion: 2017–18

Individual

- Queens Park Rangers Young Player of the Year: 2003–04
- Football League Two Player of the Month: December 2008
