= Aaron Amadi-Holloway =

Welsh footballer (born 1993)

Personal information
- Full name: Aaron Joshua Amadi-Holloway
- Date of birth: 1 February 1993 (age 33)
- Place of birth: Cardiff, Wales
- Height: 6 ft 2 in (1.88 m)
- Positions: Forward; centre-back

Team information
- Current team: Chippenham Town
- Number: 5

Youth career
- 2009–2011: Cardiff City

Senior career*
Years	Team	Apps	(Gls)
2011–2014	Bristol City	0	(0)
2011	→ Bath City (loan)	5	(0)
2014	Newport County	4	(0)
2014–2016	Wycombe Wanderers	52	(6)
2016	→ Oldham Athletic (loan)	10	(2)
2016–2017	Fleetwood Town	6	(0)
2017–2018	Oldham Athletic	51	(2)
2018–2019	Shrewsbury Town	30	(1)
2019–2020	Brisbane Roar	23	(1)
2020–2021	East Bengal	13	(2)
2021–2022	Burton Albion	6	(0)
2022	→ Barrow (loan)	14	(3)
2022–2023	Hereford	37	(4)
2023–	Chippenham Town	59	(8)

International career
	Wales U17	10	(0)
	Wales U19	1	(0)
- * Club domestic league appearances and goals as of 15:04, 15 April 2026 (UTC)

Aaron Joshua Amadi-Holloway (born 1 February 1993) is a Welsh footballer who plays as a forward or a centre-back for National League South club Chippenham Town.

== Club career ==
=== Early career ===
Born in Cardiff, Amadi-Holloway was a part of the Cardiff City youth system before joining Bristol City in 2011. On 24 November that year he was loaned to Conference Premier club Bath City until January, alongside Joe Bryan. He made five appearances on loan at Bath but was released by Bristol City in January 2014 having not made a first team appearance for them.

On 12 February 2014 Amadi-Holloway joined Newport County and made his Football League debut in the League Two 4–1 loss at Morecambe on 11 March 2014 as a 65th-minute substitute for Robbie Willmott. He made three more substitute appearances and was released by Newport at the end of the 2013–14 season.

=== Wycombe Wanderers ===
Amadi-Holloway signed for Wycombe Wanderers of League Two on 10 August 2014 on a deal until January 2015. On 4 October, he scored his first career goal, an added-time header from Joe Jacobson's corner kick to secure a 1–1 home draw against Northampton Town. The following 2 May, he scored again in a 3–2 win in the reverse fixture to qualify the Chairboys for the play-offs.

A week later in the first leg of the semi-finals, Amadi-Holloway scored in a 3–2 victory at Plymouth Argyle (5–3 aggregate). In the final at Wembley Stadium against Southend United on 23 May, he scored a sudden-death penalty in the shootout after a 1–1 draw, but his team lost it 7–6.

Amadi-Holloway joined struggling League One side Oldham Athletic on an emergency loan until the end of the season on 12 February 2016. He played ten games for them and scored twice in a 3–2 home loss to Greater Manchester neighbours Rochdale on 19 March, as the Latics avoided relegation.

=== Later career ===
Amadi-Holloway signed for Fleetwood Town of League One on a two-year contract in May 2016, for an undisclosed fee. He made his debut in the season opener against Northampton on 6 August, replacing Ashley Hunter for the last 15 minutes of a 1–1 away draw. Four days later, he scored his first goal against Leeds United in an EFL Cup first-round game four days later, opening a 2–2 draw at Highbury Stadium which Leeds won on penalties.

On 20 January 2017 Amadi-Holloway returned to Oldham Athletic on a permanent deal. He scored four times in 42 games in 2017–18 as they were relegated to League Two, including a last-minute winner as a late substitute in a 2–1 victory against rivals Bury at Boundary Park on 24 October.

On 13 July 2018 Amadi-Holloway joined League One side Shrewsbury Town for an undisclosed fee. He played 38 total games and scored three times.

On 25 June 2019, Amadi-Holloway moved outside of British football for the first time when he signed for A-League side Brisbane Roar, becoming the third signing the club announced under Robbie Fowler.

On 16 October 2020, he moved to new ISL side SC East Bengal with his former coach Robbie Fowler. He made his debut for the club on 15 December against Hyderabad FC.

On 23 July 2021, Amadi-Holloway returned to England to join League One side Burton Albion on a one-year deal. The following 28 January, he joined EFL League Two side Barrow on loan for the remainder of the 2021–22 season. Amadi-Holloway was released at the end of his one-year deal.

On 5 August 2022, Amadi-Holloway dropped into non-league football joining National League North club Hereford. His performances throughout the season, particularly at centre-back where he made the majority of his appearances, earned him Hereford's Player of the Season award. Despite being half way through a two-year contract, on 24 June 2023, it was mutually agreed between Amadi-Holloway and Hereford that the remainder of his contract would be cancelled and therefore could leave the club.

On 12 July 2023, it was announced that Amadi-Holloway had joined National League South club Chippenham Town. He extended his stay for the 2024–25 season on 8 June 2024.

== International career ==
Born in Wales, Amadi-Holloway is of Nigerian descent. He attained 10 caps for Wales at under-17 level and represented Wales at under-19 level.

== Career statistics ==
As of match played 26 Apr 2025

Appearances and goals by club, season and competition
Club	Season	League			FA Cup		League Cup		Other		Total	
Club	Season	Division	Apps	Goals	Apps	Goals	Apps	Goals	Apps	Goals	Apps	Goals
Bristol City	2011–12	Championship	0	0	0	0	0	0	0	0	0	0
Bristol City	2012–13	Championship	0	0	0	0	0	0	0	0	0	0
Bristol City	2013–14	League One	0	0	0	0	0	0	0	0	0	0
Bristol City	Total		0	0	0	0	0	0	0	0	0	0
Bath City (loan)	2011–12	Conference Premier	5	0	—		—		1 (Note: Appearance in FA Trophy)	0	6	0
Newport County	2013–14	League Two	4	0	—		—		—		4	0
Wycombe Wanderers	2014–15	League Two	29	3	1	0	1	0	4 (Note: One appearance in Football League Trophy; three appearances, one goal in League Two play-offs)	1	35	4
Wycombe Wanderers	2015–16	League Two	23	3	4	1	1	0	1 (Note: Appearance(s) in Football League Trophy)	0	29	4
Wycombe Wanderers	Total		52	6	5	1	2	0	5	1	64	8
Oldham Athletic (loan)	2015–16	League One	10	2	—		—		—		10	2
Fleetwood Town	2016–17	League One	6	0	2	1	1	1	1 (Note: Appearance(s) in EFL Trophy)	0	10	2
Oldham Athletic	2016–17	League One	15	0	—		—		—		15	0
Oldham Athletic	2017–18	League One	36	2	1	1	1	0	4	1	42	4
Oldham Athletic	Total		51	2	1	1	1	0	4	1	58	4
Shrewsbury Town	2018–19	League One	30	2	7	1	0	0	1	0	38	3
Brisbane Roar	2019–20	A-League	23	1	0	0	—		—		23	1
East Bengal	2020–21	Indian Super League	13	2	0	0	—		—		13	2
Burton Albion	2021–22	League One	6	0	2	0	0	0	3	3	11	3
Barrow (loan)	2021–22	League Two	14	3	0	0	0	0	0	0	14	3
Hereford	2022–23	National League North	37	4	2	0	—		0	0	39	4
Chippenham Town	2023–24	National League South	34	5	1	0	—		2	0	37	5
Chippenham Town	2024–25	National League South	25	3	0	0	—		1	0	15	3
Chippenham Town	2025–26	National League South	0	0	0	0	—		0	0	0	0
Chippenham Town	Total		59	8	1	0	—		3	0	52	8
Career Total			310	30	20	4	4	1	18	5	352	40
