= Alex Lynch =

Welsh footballer

Personal information
- Full name: Alexander Patrick Lynch
- Date of birth: 4 April 1995 (age 31)
- Place of birth: Holyhead, Wales
- Height: 1.80 m (5 ft 11 in)
- Position: Goalkeeper

Team information
- Current team: Holyhead Hotspur (goalkeeping coach)

Youth career
- Amlwch Town
- 2011–2013: Peterborough United

Senior career*
Years	Team	Apps	(Gls)
2013–2014	Peterborough United	0	(0)
2013	→ Histon (loan)	1	(0)
2013–2014	→ Stamford (loan)	29	(0)
2014	→ Brackley Town (loan)	1	(0)
2014–2016	Wycombe Wanderers	4	(0)
2014	→ Hayes & Yeading United (loan)	0	(0)
2014–2015	→ Burnham (loan)	30	(0)
2015	→ Wealdstone (loan)	0	(0)
2016	Bala Town	7	(0)
2016–2018	Chester	27	(0)
2018	Llandudno	7	(0)
2018–2023	Holyhead Hotspur	21	(0)

International career^{‡}
2011–2012	Wales U17	5	(0)
- * Club domestic league appearances and goals as of 01:44, 7 December 2023 (UTC) ‡ National team caps and goals as of 20:05, 23 May 2015 (UTC)

Alexander Patrick Lynch (born 4 April 1995) is a Welsh football coach and former footballer who played as a goalkeeper. He is currently player/goalkeeping coach at Holyhead Hotspur.

== Club career ==
=== Peterborough United ===
Lynch joined Peterborough United on a two-year scholarship from Welsh Alliance League side Amlwch Town in 2011. In 2013, Lynch was given a one-year professional contract and was subsequently loaned to Histon (Conference South), Stamford (Northern Premier League Premier Division) and Brackley Town (Conference North) to gain experience.

=== Wycombe Wanderers ===
In 2014, Lynch signed a two-year contract with Wycombe Wanderers after being released by Peterborough United. Lynch was loaned out to Hayes & Yeading United (Conference South) and Burnham (Southern League Premier Division) to gain further experience.

On 2 May 2015, Lynch made his professional debut as a substitute for the injured Matt Ingram in a 3–2 win against Northampton Town. Lynch continued to deputise for Ingram as Wycombe progressed from their League Two playoff semi–final against Plymouth Argyle to the 2015 League Two playoff final.

On 7 August 2015, Lynch was loaned to Conference South side Wealdstone due to an injury to Jonathan North, however he was recalled without making an appearance in the same month. On 9 January 2016, Lynch featured in Wycombe's 1–1 draw against Aston Villa in the FA Cup 3rd round due to the suspension of Matt Ingram.

On 31 January 2018, Lynch joined Welsh Premier League side Llandudno, although he was released at the end of the season.

He was hospitalised in July 2018 whilst playing for Holyhead Hotspur.

== International career ==
Lynch has represented Wales at under-17 and under-19 level.

== Career statistics ==
=== Club ===
As of 15 July 2017

Club	Season	League			FA Cup		League Cup		Other		Total	
Club	Season	Division	Apps	Goals	Apps	Goals	Apps	Goals	Apps	Goals	Apps	Goals
Wycombe Wanderers	2014–15	League Two	1	0	0	0	0	0	3 (Note: Appearances in the League Two play-offs)	0	4	0
Wycombe Wanderers	2015–16	League Two	3	0	1	0	0	0	0	0	4	0
Wycombe Wanderers	Wycombe total		4	0	1	0	0	0	3	0	8	0
Bala Town	2016–17	Welsh Premier League	7	0	—				0	0	7	0
Chester	2016–17	National League	27	0	0	0	—		0	0	27	0
Chester	2017–18	National League										
Career total			38	0	1	0	0	0	3	0	42	0
