= Matt Bloomfield =

English footballer (born 1984)

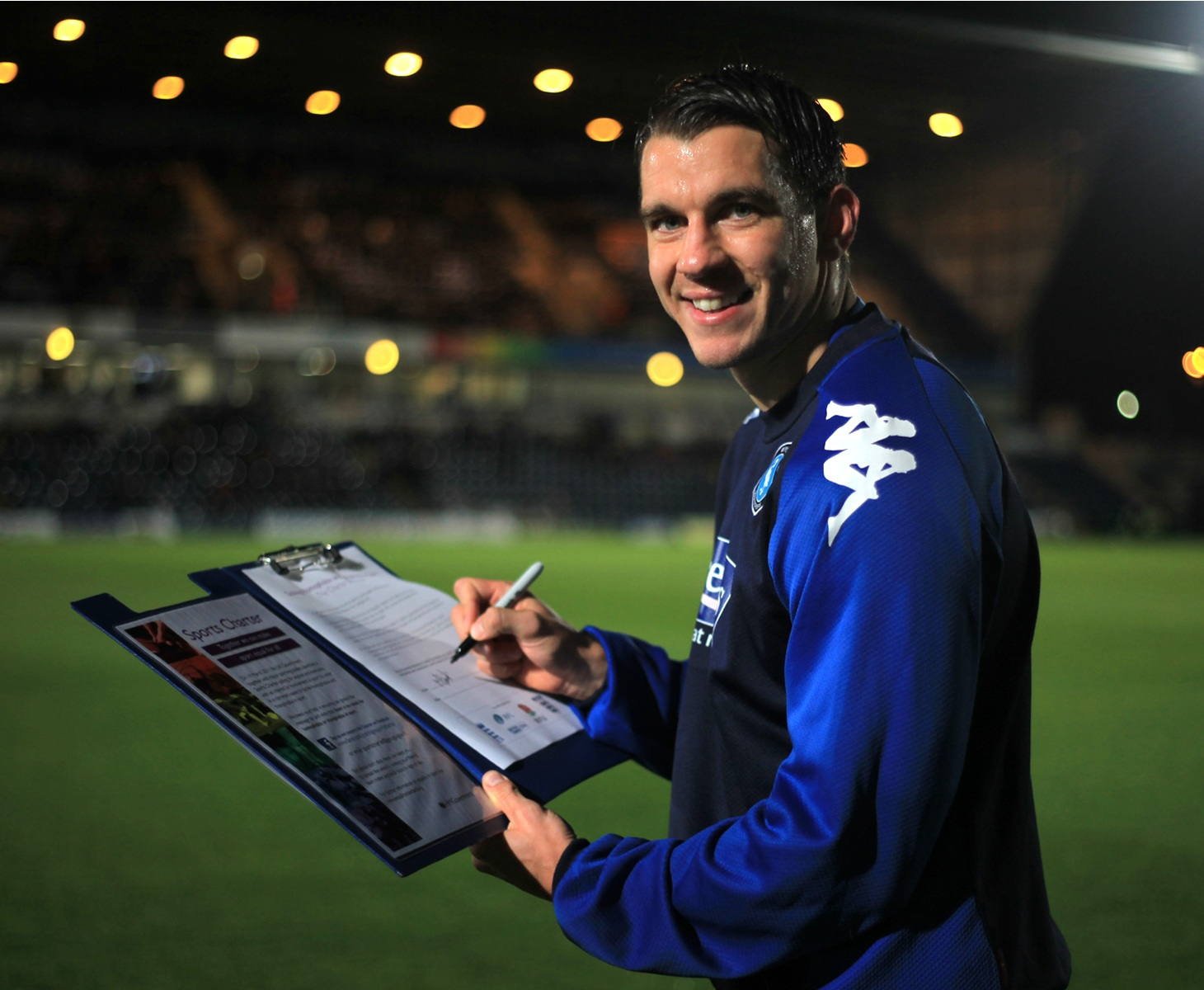
- Bloomfield in 2011

Personal information
- Full name: Matthew James Bloomfield
- Date of birth: 8 February 1984 (age 42)
- Place of birth: Felixstowe, England
- Height: 5 ft 9 in (1.75 m)
- Position: Midfielder

Youth career
- 1997–2001: Ipswich Town

Senior career*
Years	Team	Apps	(Gls)
2001–2003	Ipswich Town	0	(0)
2003–2022	Wycombe Wanderers	488	(40)
Total		488	(40)

International career
2001	England U18	1	(0)
2002	England U19	1	(0)
2003	England U20	1	(0)

Managerial career
- 2022–2023: Colchester United
- 2023–2025: Wycombe Wanderers
- 2025: Luton Town
- 2026: Oxford United
- * Club domestic league appearances and goals

Matthew James Bloomfield (born 8 February 1984) is an English professional football manager and former player who was most recently head coach of EFL League One club Oxford United.

A product of Ipswich Town's academy, Bloomfield joined Wycombe Wanderers on a free transfer in 2003, having made just two EFL Cup appearances for Ipswich. He spent 19 years with Wycombe, playing for the club in League Two, League One and the Championship, and was in the team that reached the semi-final of the 2006–07 Football League Cup. At the start of his final professional season in 2021, he was named as a first team coach, in addition to his role as a player.

Following his retirement in 2022, he moved into full-time management, initially with Colchester United in EFL League Two, before returning to manage Wycombe in February 2023. He left Wycombe in January 2025 for the vacant managerial role at Luton Town, but was dismissed nine months later. He was appointed head coach of Oxford United in January 2026, but was dismissed in June 2026 following Oxford's relegation to League One.

== Playing career ==
Born in Felixstowe, Suffolk, Bloomfield started his career as a trainee with Ipswich Town in August 2001. At one point he was scouted by Newcastle United and also represented England at under-18, under-19 and under-20 levels. But with a plethora of midfielders at Portman Road, he was released by manager Joe Royle to join Wycombe Wanderers on 22 December 2003, having appeared just once for Ipswich's first team.

Bloomfield's debut came in the 2–0 home defeat against Rushden & Diamonds on 28 December, and he scored his first goal for the club against Queens Park Rangers in March 2004.

In July 2008, Bloomfield finally signed a two-year contract extension. Recovering from a long-term injury at the time, Wycombe had decided not to offer him a pay rise. Bloomfield finally signed after Wycombe's new manager, Peter Taylor, said he would look to get Bloomfield a better deal when he had returned to fitness and was back in the first team.

Bloomfield made his return to league football on 2 December, as part of a 4–0 win at home to Macclesfield Town.

At the end of the 2009–10 season, Bloomfield featured heavily in the side that failed to keep Wycombe in League One. Despite this, his performances persuaded manager Gary Waddock to further extend his contract until summer 2011. He later kept his place in the team at the start of the 2010–11 season, scoring his first goal of the season against Accrington Stanley.

Bloomfield then once again extended his contract for a further year taking him into his eighth season at the club, amassing over 250 appearances. He was also part of the Wycombe side that reached the League Cup semi finals in 2007, drawing 1–1 in the first leg but later losing 4–0 in the return fixture against Chelsea.

On 16 July 2014, Wycombe held Bloomfield's testimonial against Chelsea, which finished 0–5 to Chelsea. The likes of John Terry, Branislav Ivanović and José Mourinho were at Adams Park to celebrate the event.

Bloomfield was part of the Wycombe side that saw promotion to the Championship in 2020, starting as captain in the final where they defeated local rivals Oxford United 2–1 at Wembley Stadium to take the side into English football's second tier for the first time in the club's history. Bloomfield made 16 appearances in the Championship for Wycombe the following season, which would prove to be his last full season as a Wycombe player, as he began to take up additional duties after being named a first team coach. The club were relegated back to League One at the end of the campaign, after which Bloomfield would make just one more appearance for the club, captaining the side in an EFL Cup first round tie against Exeter, which Wycombe would later win on penalties. Bloomfield was substituted at half time for Oliver Pendlebury, after suffering a concussion, after which the club doctor advised him that it may no longer be safe for him to play football. Bloomfield announced his retirement from active playing on 2 February 2022.

== Coaching career ==
=== Colchester United ===
On 30 September 2022, Bloomfield was appointed head coach of League Two side Colchester United. At the time of his appointment, Colchester were sat in 21st position, one point clear of the relegation zone after ten matches. Having initially steadied the ship upon his arrival, a vital January saw Colchester pick up thirteen points from six matches and led to Bloomfield being awarded the EFL League Two Manager of the Month award.

=== Wycombe Wanderers ===
On 21 February 2023, following the departure of long-term manager Gareth Ainsworth to Queens Park Rangers, Bloomfield agreed in principle to return to Wycombe Wanderers as manager.

Following an impressive start to the 2024–25 season, Bloomfield was named EFL League One Manager of the Month for October 2024 as he led Wycombe into the automatic promotion places. A further four wins from four saw him win the award for a second consecutive month.

=== Luton Town ===
On 14 January 2025, Bloomfield was appointed manager of EFL Championship side Luton Town with a three-and-a-half-year contract. Despite a run of six wins from their final twelve games Luton were relegated to the EFL League One at the end of the season after a 5–3 defeat away at West Bromwich Albion, which made Luton the first club to suffer consecutive relegations from the Premier League since Sunderland in 2017–18. On 6 October 2025 he was dismissed by Luton after a poor run of results, with the club in 11th place in the league.

=== Oxford United ===
On 9 January 2026, Bloomfield was appointed head coach of Championship club Oxford United. On 25 April 2026, Oxford United were relegated from the Championship to League One. In June 2026, Bloomfield was dismissed by Oxford.

== Personal life ==
As of November 2010, Bloomfield was studying to complete a degree in Professional Sports Writing and Broadcasting at Staffordshire University, alongside former teammate Kevin Betsy. Bloomfield was the first footballer to sign the "Football V Homophobia charter for action" in October 2011.

== Career statistics ==
Appearances and goals by club, season and competition
Club	Season	League			FA Cup		League Cup		Other		Total	
Club	Season	Division	Apps	Goals	Apps	Goals	Apps	Goals	Apps	Goals	Apps	Goals
Ipswich Town	2003–04	First Division	0	0	0	0	1	0	0	0	1	0
Wycombe Wanderers	2003–04	Second Division	12	1	0	0	0	0	0	0	12	1
Wycombe Wanderers	2004–05	League Two	26	2	2	0	0	0	2 (Note: Appearance(s) in Football League / EFL Trophy)	0	30	2
Wycombe Wanderers	2005–06	League Two	41	5	1	0	1	0	3	0	46	5
Wycombe Wanderers	2006–07	League Two	41	4	2	0	6	0	2	0	51	4
Wycombe Wanderers	2007–08	League Two	35	4	1	1	1	0	1	0	38	5
Wycombe Wanderers	2008–09	League Two	20	1	1	0	0	0	0	0	21	1
Wycombe Wanderers	2009–10	League One	14	2	1	0	1	0	0	0	16	2
Wycombe Wanderers	2010–11	League Two	34	3	2	0	1	0	1	0	38	3
Wycombe Wanderers	2011–12	League One	31	2	0	0	1	0	2	0	34	2
Wycombe Wanderers	2012–13	League Two	2	1	0	0	1	0	0	0	3	1
Wycombe Wanderers	2013–14	League Two	32	0	1	0	0	0	2	1	35	1
Wycombe Wanderers	2014–15	League Two	33	1	2	0	1	0	3 (Note: One appearance in Football League Trophy, two appearances in League Two play-offs)	0	39	1
Wycombe Wanderers	2015–16	League Two	27	1	4	0	1	0	1	0	32	1
Wycombe Wanderers	2016–17	League Two	33	5	3	0	1	0	1	0	38	5
Wycombe Wanderers	2017–18	League Two	37	3	3	0	1	0	2	0	43	3
Wycombe Wanderers	2018–19	League One	28	2	0	0	2	0	1	0	31	2
Wycombe Wanderers	2019–20	League One	27	2	1	0	0	0	3 (Note: Appearances in EFL League One play-offs)	0	31	2
Wycombe Wanderers	2020–21	Championship	15	1	2	0	1	0	—		18	1
Wycombe Wanderers	2021–22	League One	0	0	0	0	0	0	1	0	1	0
Wycombe Wanderers	Total		488	40	26	1	19	0	22	1	558	42
Career total			488	40	26	1	20	0	21	1	558	42

== Managerial statistics ==
As of match played 2 May 2026

Managerial record by team and tenure
Team	From	To	Record					Ref.
Team	From	To	P	W	D	L	Win %	Ref.
Colchester United	30 September 2022	21 February 2023	27	9	6	12	33.3	
Wycombe Wanderers	21 February 2023	14 January 2025	108	52	24	32	48.1	
Luton Town	14 January 2025	6 October 2025	33	12	7	14	36.4	
Oxford United	9 January 2026	20 June 2026	22	6	7	9	27.3	
Total			189	79	43	67	41.8	

== Honours ==
=== As a player ===
Wycombe Wanderers

- Football/EFL League Two third-placed promotion: 2008–09, 2010–11, 2017–18
- EFL League One play-offs: 2020

=== As a manager ===
Wycombe Wanderers

- EFL Trophy runner-up: 2023–24

Individual

- EFL League One Manager of the Month: April 2024, October 2024, November 2024
- EFL League Two Manager of the Month: January 2023
