= Sam Wood (footballer) =

English footballer

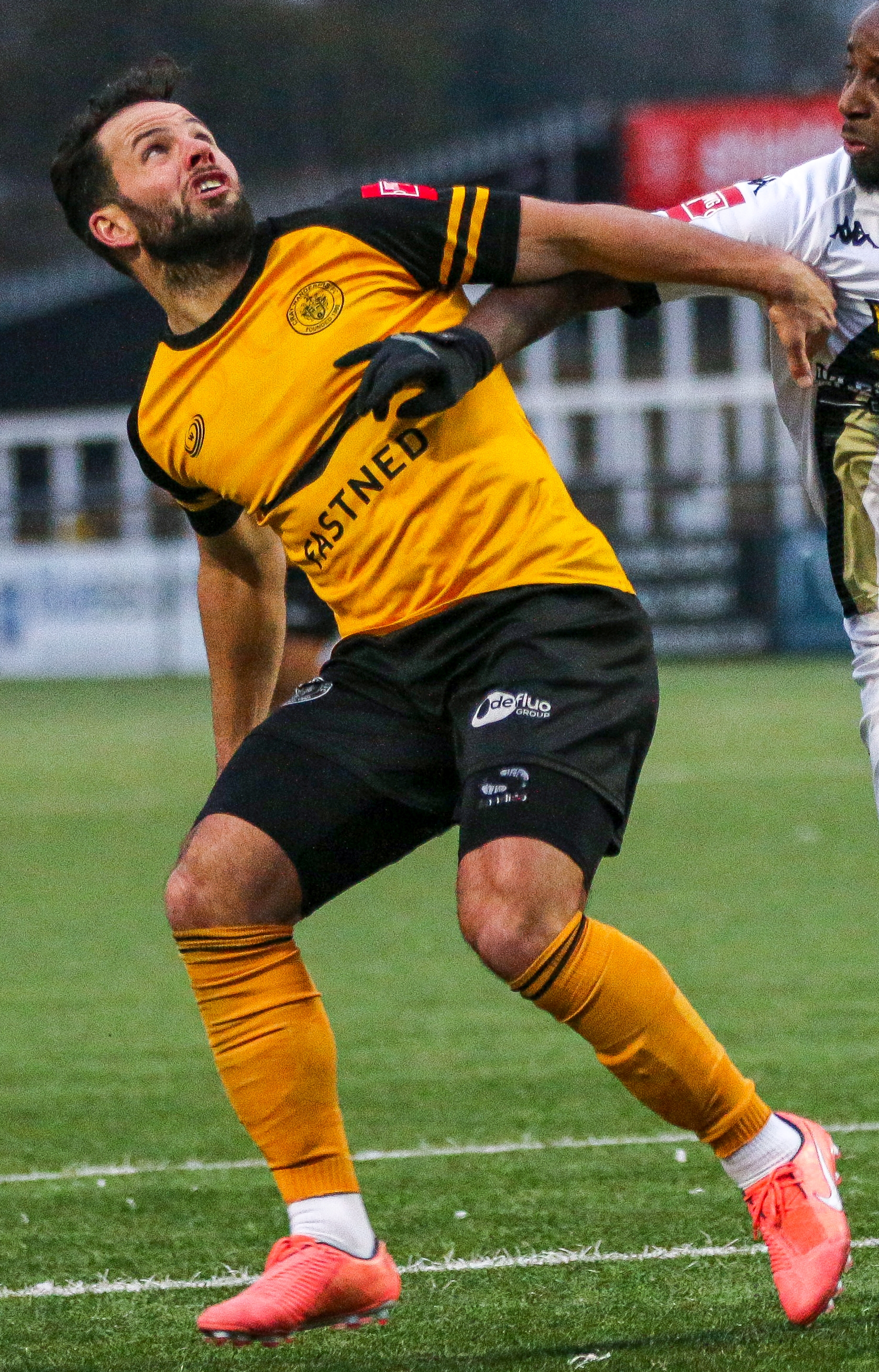
- Wood playing for Cray Wanderers in 2023

Personal information
- Full name: Samuel James Wood
- Date of birth: 9 August 1986 (age 40)
- Place of birth: Sidcup, England
- Height: 6 ft 0 in (1.83 m)
- Positions: Midfielder; defender

Team information
- Current team: Snodland Town

Youth career
- 1999–2003: Cray Wanderers

Senior career*
| Years | Team | Apps | (Gls) |
| 2002–2005 | Cray Wanderers | 93 | (8) |
| 2005–2008 | Bromley | 108 | (5) |
| 2008–2012 | Brentford | 108 | (4) |
| 2011–2012 | → Rotherham United (loan) | 26 | (1) |
| 2012–2017 | Wycombe Wanderers | 183 | (14) |
| 2017–2018 | Eastleigh | 36 | (0) |
| 2018–2020 | Bromley | 74 | (0) |
| 2020–2022 | Dover Athletic | 33 | (2) |
| 2022–2024 | Cray Wanderers | 79 | (7) |
| 2024–2025 | Glebe | 17 | (0) |
| 2025 | Beckenham Town | 33 | (1) |
| 2025– | Snodland Town | 5 | (0) |
- * Club domestic league appearances and goals as of 12:17, 24 November 2025 (UTC)

Samuel James Wood (born 9 August 1986) is an English professional footballer who plays for Southern Counties East League Premier Division club Snodland Town. Wood is a left-sided and right-sided player who can play either at full-back or on the wing.

== Career ==
=== Early career ===
Sam Wood started playing football for Long Lane before joining Cray Wanderers. He progressed through the ranks at the club before joining the reserve team in 2002 and eventually making his first team debut in 2003. During his time at Cray, he became a fans' favourite, helping the club to the quarter-final of the FA Vase, and promotion to the Isthmian League for the first time in the club's history, in the 2003–04 season, and scoring Cray supporters' goal of the season to clinch a 2–0 victory against AFC Wimbledon to end their 78-game unbeaten run. He finished his Cray career with 8 goals from 93 games, and then signed for Bromley, the club whose ground Cray shared, in 2005. While a non-league footballer, he also worked as a body double (for the likes of Lionel Messi, Cesc Fabregas and Cristiano Ronaldo), for USC at Bluewater and in advertisement for Nike and Adidas.

At Bromley, Wood won the Supporters' Player of the Year award in 2006 and the Club Player of the Year in 2007, and scored 21 goals from 159 appearances. His performances attracted interest from professional clubs, and after trials with clubs including Gillingham, Charlton Athletic and Wolverhampton Wanderers, Wood joined League Two club Brentford in May 2008.

=== Brentford ===
After impressing in pre-season, Wood made his Football League debut for Brentford against Bury, but picked up an injury in their 1–0 loss which kept him out for a few weeks. He proved his fitness by playing the full 90 minutes – and scoring – in a practice game, and returned to the first team as a substitute in the 1–1 draw with Lincoln City. He scored his first goal for the club on 28 December against Exeter City, and played regularly for the first team, helping the Bees to the 2008–09 League Two title, as well as scooping several individual awards including the supporters' Player of the Season.

In his second season, Wood lost his place on the left wing due to the form of Myles Weston, but was a regular in the team, either playing on the right wing or at left-back in place of the injury-prone Ryan Dickson.

Wood spend the majority of the 2011–12 season on loan at Rotherham United, making 26 appearances and scoring one goal. At the end of the season he was released by Brentford.

=== Wycombe Wanderers ===
In July 2012 Wood signed a two-year deal with Wycombe Wanderers, after interest from AFC Wimbledon. He scored a 35-yard volley on his debut. which was later named as Wycombe's 'Goal of the Season'. Like at Brentford, Wood played at either left-back or left midfield. His versatility was recognised supporters as they named him their player of the season.

Wood continued to hold down a regular place in his second season with the club. Despite avoiding relegation to the non-league on the final day of the season, Wood was rewarded with a new two-year contract taking him to July 2016. During the 2014–15 League Two play off final Wood had his penalty saved during the shootout, resulting in Southend United gaining promotion.

At the end of the 2016–17 season, Wood left Wycombe Wanderers after his contract was not renewed.

=== Non-League ===
Upon the expiration of his contract with Wycombe, Wood returned to non-league to join National League side Eastleigh on a two-year deal. After just one season with the club, Wood had his contract terminated by mutual consent after expressing a desire to leave the club.

Having had his contract with Eastleigh terminated, Wood returned to former club Bromley having previously played for the club from 2005 to 2008. Wood was with the club for two seasons, the second of which was curtailed early due to the COVID-19 pandemic before his departure from the club was announced on 1 August 2020.

On 27 August 2020, Wood joined fellow National League side Dover Athletic, linking up with former manager Andy Hessenthaler who had previously managed Wood at Eastleigh, where he was appointed captain for the season. Wood's first season with the club was halted when in February 2021, Dover placed all members of staff on furlough until they received appropriate funding to be able to continue playing after the decision was made for the season to continue. On 26 March 2021, it was announced that all of Dover's results from the season were to be expunged and the club would receive a £40,000 fine and a 12-point deduction for the following season. Wood signed a new contract with the club in June 2021, one of only four players to do so with the club also switching to part-time contracts. On 1 February 2022, Wood left the club by mutual consent. He joined Cray Wanderers the same day and played in the 3–2 win at Potters Bar Town.

== Career statistics ==
As of end of 2024–25 season

Appearances and goals by club, season and competition
| Club | Season | League | | | FA Cup | | League Cup | | Other | | Total | |
| Club | Season | Division | Apps | Goals | Apps | Goals | Apps | Goals | Apps | Goals | Apps | Goals |
|---|---|---|---|---|---|---|---|---|---|---|---|---|
| Cray Wanderers | 2004–05 | Isthmian League First Division | 31 | 4 | 0 | 0 | — | | 0 | 0 | 31 | 4 |
| Bromley | 2005–06 | Isthmian League Premier Division | 30 | 3 | 0 | 0 | — | | 5 (Note: Appearances in Isthmian League Cup) | 4 | 35 | 7 |
| Bromley | 2006–07 | Isthmian League Premier Division | 36 | 2 | 0 | 0 | — | | 2 (Note: Appearances in Isthmian League play-offs) | 0 | 38 | 2 |
| Bromley | 2007–08 | Conference South | 42 | 0 | 0 | 0 | — | | 0 | 0 | 42 | 0 |
| Bromley | Total | | 108 | 5 | 0 | 0 | — | | 7 | 4 | 115 | 9 |
| Brentford | 2008–09 | League Two | 40 | 1 | 2 | 0 | 0 | 0 | 1 (Note: Appearances in EFL Trophy) | 0 | 43 | 1 |
| Brentford | 2009–10 | League One | 43 | 2 | 3 | 0 | 1 | 0 | 1 | 0 | 48 | 2 |
| Brentford | 2010–11 | League One | 20 | 1 | 1 | 0 | 2 | 1 | 4 | 0 | 27 | 2 |
| Brentford | 2011–12 | League One | 5 | 0 | 0 | 0 | 1 | 0 | 2 | 0 | 8 | 0 |
| Brentford | Total | | 108 | 4 | 6 | 0 | 4 | 1 | 8 | 0 | 126 | 5 |
| Rotherham United (loan) | 2011–12 | League Two | 26 | 1 | 1 | 0 | — | | 0 | 0 | 27 | 1 |
| Wycombe Wanderers | 2012–13 | League Two | 35 | 3 | 1 | 0 | 1 | 0 | 1 | 0 | 38 | 3 |
| Wycombe Wanderers | 2013–14 | League Two | 43 | 2 | 3 | 0 | 0 | 0 | 3 | 0 | 49 | 2 |
| Wycombe Wanderers | 2014–15 | League Two | 44 | 5 | 2 | 1 | 1 | 0 | 3 (Note: Appearances in EFL League Two play-offs) | 0 | 50 | 6 |
| Wycombe Wanderers | 2015–16 | League Two | 29 | 2 | 4 | 0 | 1 | 0 | 1 | 0 | 35 | 2 |
| Wycombe Wanderers | 2016–17 | League Two | 32 | 2 | 3 | 1 | 1 | 0 | 5 | 0 | 41 | 3 |
| Wycombe Wanderers | Total | | 183 | 14 | 13 | 2 | 4 | 0 | 13 | 0 | 213 | 16 |
| Eastleigh | 2017–18 | National League | 35 | 0 | 1 | 0 | — | | 1 (Note: Appearance in FA Trophy) | 0 | 37 | 0 |
| Eastleigh | 2018–19 | National League | 1 | 0 | — | | — | | — | | 1 | 0 |
| Eastleigh | Total | | 36 | 0 | 1 | 0 | — | | 1 | 0 | 38 | 0 |
| Bromley | 2018–19 | National League | 41 | 0 | 2 | 0 | — | | 1 | 0 | 44 | 0 |
| Bromley | 2019–20 | National League | 33 | 0 | 3 | 0 | — | | 1 | 0 | 37 | 0 |
| Bromley | Total | | 74 | 0 | 5 | 0 | — | | 2 | 0 | 81 | 0 |
| Dover Athletic | 2020–21 | National League | 15 | 2 | 0 | 0 | — | | 1 | 0 | 16 | 2 |
| Dover Athletic | 2021–22 | National League | 18 | 0 | 1 | 0 | — | | 1 | 0 | 20 | 0 |
| Dover Athletic | Total | | 33 | 2 | 1 | 0 | 0 | 0 | 2 | 0 | 36 | 2 |
| Cray Wanderers | 2021–22 | Isthmian League Premier Division | 13 | 3 | — | | — | | — | | 13 | 3 |
| Cray Wanderers | 2022–23 | Isthmian League Premier Division | 36 | 4 | 2 | 0 | — | | 3 (Note: Appearances in FA Trophy, London Senior Cup and Isthmian League play-offs) | 2 | 41 | 6 |
| Cray Wanderers | 2023–24 | Isthmian League Premier Division | 30 | 0 | 3 | 1 | — | | 7 (Note: Appearances in FA Trophy, Kent Senior Cup and London Senior Cup) | 0 | 40 | 1 |
| Cray Wanderers | Total | | 79 | 7 | 5 | 1 | 0 | 0 | 10 | 2 | 94 | 10 |
| Glebe | 2024–25 | Southern Counties East; Premier Division | 14 | 0 | 1 | 0 | — | | 2 (Note: One appearance in FA Vase, one appearance in Southern Counties East Football League Challenge Cup) | 0 | 17 | 0 |
| Beckenham Town | 2024–25 | Isthmian League South East Division | 18 | 1 | 0 | 0 | — | | 0 | 0 | 18 | 1 |
| Career total | | | 710 | 38 | 33 | 3 | 8 | 1 | 44 | 6 | 795 | 48 |

== Honours ==
Cray Wanderers

- Kent League: 2002–03, 2003–04

Bromley

- Kent Senior Cup: 2005–06, 2006–07
- Isthmian League Premier Division play-offs: 2006–07

Brentford

- Football League Two: 2008–09
