= 2020 EFL League One play-off final =

Football match between Wycombe Wanderers and Oxford United

- The match took place at Wembley Stadium.
Wycombe Wanderers	Oxford United
2	1
- Date: 13 July 2020
- Venue: Wembley Stadium, London
- Man of the Match: Anthony Stewart
- Referee: Robert Jones
- Attendance: 0 (Note: The final was played behind closed doors due to the COVID-19 pandemic in the United Kingdom.)

The 2020 EFL League One play-off final was a football match contested between Wycombe Wanderers and Oxford United to determine the third and final team to gain promotion from EFL League One to the EFL Championship. It was played on 13 July 2020 at Wembley Stadium in London. The top two teams of the 2019–20 EFL League One season (Coventry City and Rotherham United) gained automatic promotion to the Championship, while the teams placed from third to sixth place in the table took part in play-off semi-finals and the winners of these semi-finals competed for the final place in the Championship. The match was played behind closed doors to comply with restrictions during the coronavirus pandemic.

Wycombe took the lead early in the first half with a goal from Anthony Stewart before Mark Sykes equalised for Oxford 12 minutes into the second half. Joe Jacobson then converted a penalty with eleven minutes remaining, and Wycombe held on to win the match 2–1. By securing promotion to the Championship for the next season, Wycombe Wanderers would play at the second tier of English football for the first time in the 133-year history of the club.

== Route to the final ==
EFL League One final table, leading positions
Pos	Team	Pld	W	D	L	GF	GA	GD	Pts	PPG
1	Coventry City	34	18	13	3	48	30	+18	67	1.97
2	Rotherham United	35	18	8	9	61	38	+23	62	1.77
3	Wycombe Wanderers	34	17	8	9	45	40	+5	59	1.74
4	Oxford United	35	17	9	9	61	37	+24	60	1.71
5	Portsmouth	35	17	9	9	53	36	+17	60	1.71
6	Fleetwood Town	35	16	12	7	51	38	+13	60	1.71

Because of the COVID-19 pandemic, the Football League season was temporarily suspended on 13 March. Three weeks later this suspension was extended indefinitely. On 9 June, clubs in EFL League One and League Two, the third and fourth tiers of the English football league system, voted to curtail the season, meaning the final table would be calculated by a points-per-game (PPG) method. The play-offs would then be played between the clubs finishing third to sixth as normal. Wycombe Wanderers finished the season in third place in the revised League One table, (Note: Wycombe Wanderers finished seventh in League One when using the traditional table, but replaced Peterborough United in the play-off positions when PPG was applied.) one place ahead of Oxford United. Both therefore missed out on the two automatic places for promotion to the EFL Championship, which went to Coventry City and Rotherham United. This meant Wycombe Wanderers, Oxford United, Portsmouth (who finished fifth) and Fleetwood Town (sixth) took part in the play-offs to determine the third promoted team.

Wycombe Wanderers faced Fleetwood Town in the other play-off semi-final, the first leg taking place on 3 July 2020 at Highbury Stadium, Fleetwood. In a game described by BBC reporter Gary Smee as "extraordinary", Nnamdi Ofoborh put the visitors ahead after 75 seconds before Ched Evans levelled the game in the fourth minute from the penalty spot. It was 2–1 to Wycombe after six minutes when Joe Jacobson's corner was deflected into the net by the Fleetwood goalkeeper Alex Cairns. Fleetwood right-back Lewie Coyle then conceded a penalty and was sent off for a foul on Jacobson, who missed the spot kick. David Wheeler then scored Wycombe's third just before half time, and Alex Samuel made it 4–1 twelve minutes into the second half. With six minutes of the game remaining, Fleetwood were reduced to nine men as Paddy Madden received his second yellow card for dissent, and with no further scoring, the game ended 4–1 to Wycombe. The second leg of the semi-final was played at Adams Park, High Wycombe, three days later. Fleetwood took the lead midway through the first half with a goal from Danny Andrew before Fred Onyedinma equalised two minutes into the second half. Jacobson then fouled Barrie McKay to concede a penalty which Evans converted for Fleetwood, giving his team a 2–1 lead. Onyedinma then struck his and Wycombe's second goal to level the match which finished without further scoring. The semi-final ended 6–3 to Wycombe on aggregate and they qualified for the final. During the second leg, Wycombe player Adebayo Akinfenwa was racially abused by a representative of Fleetwood Town who referred to him as a "fat water buffalo".

Oxford United's opponents in their play-off semi-final were Portsmouth, with the first leg being played on 3 July 2020 at Fratton Park, Portsmouth. It was the first league game for 115 days due to the league suspension. Ronan Curtis opened the scoring for the home side on 32 minutes but Marcus Browne equalised two minutes before half-time. With a goalless second half, the match ended 1–1. The second leg was played three days later at the Kassam Stadium in Oxford. Marcus Harness put the visitors into the lead but in first-half stoppage time, Ellis Harrison scored an own goal to level the match. With no goals in the second half, the aggregate score of 2–2 meant that extra time was played. After a goalless thirty minutes, the game required a penalty shootout to determine the winner. Portsmouth's Cameron McGeehan saw his spot kick saved by the Oxford goalkeeper Simon Eastwood. Cameron Brannagan then scored the decisive penalty to ensure Oxford progressed to the final, having won 5–4 on penalties.

== Match ==
=== Background ===
Wycombe's Gareth Ainsworth, the longest-serving manager in the EFL, said before the match: "The season we have had has been astonishing ... This Wycombe team keeps on surprising and this could be the biggest surprise in history." His counterpart Karl Robinson noted: "This is one more push, one more game and one more adventure together". Oxford were expected to continue to play a passing game, having made the most passes during the season. Conversely Wycombe's approach was more direct, having scored 24 times from set pieces throughout the season. Robinson stated that his team would be unfazed by the difference in style but urged caution: "I don't overly worry about the style of the opposition ... It is very disrespectful if we use derogatory terms, as their style has got them to the final and ours has got ourselves to the final".

Oxford United last played in the second tier of English football after being relegated from the First Division in the 1998–99 season. The club was relegated to the Football Conference in the 2005–06 season and spent four seasons playing non-League football. They had never previously featured in any Football League play-off finals, but had achieved promotion to League Two after winning the 2010 Conference Premier play-off final. In contrast, Wycombe had never played at Championship level in their history, having been promoted as champions into the Football League from the Football Conference in the 1992–93 season. They went on to make back-to-back promotions by beating Preston North End 4–2 at the old Wembley Stadium in the 1994 Football League Third Division play-off final. The suspension of the league had meant there had been only one match between the two teams during the regular season: in December 2019, Oxford won at home 1–0. Described by the BBC as a "fiery local derby", the match saw Akinfenwa sent off mid-way through the first half, and seven other players booked. Wycombe's highest scorers during the season were Jacobson with eleven (and three assists) and Akinfenwa with ten (and five assists). Oxford's top marksmen were Matty Taylor with thirteen goals (and one assist), and James Henry with twelve goals (and ten assists).

The referee for the match was Robert Jones, who was assisted by Timothy Wood and James Mainwaring. Gavin Wood acted as the fourth official. Because of the COVID-19 pandemic, the match was played behind closed doors, only the second time a competitive match at Wembley Stadium had been conducted in such conditions. Robinson made one modification to his team from the second play-off semi-final, with Taylor replacing Jamie Mackie in Oxford's starting lineup, while Wycombe's team was unchanged. A minute's applause was held before kick-off to commemorate the death of Jack Charlton and the Black Lives Matter cause was recognised with both teams taking the knee for a short period.

=== First half ===
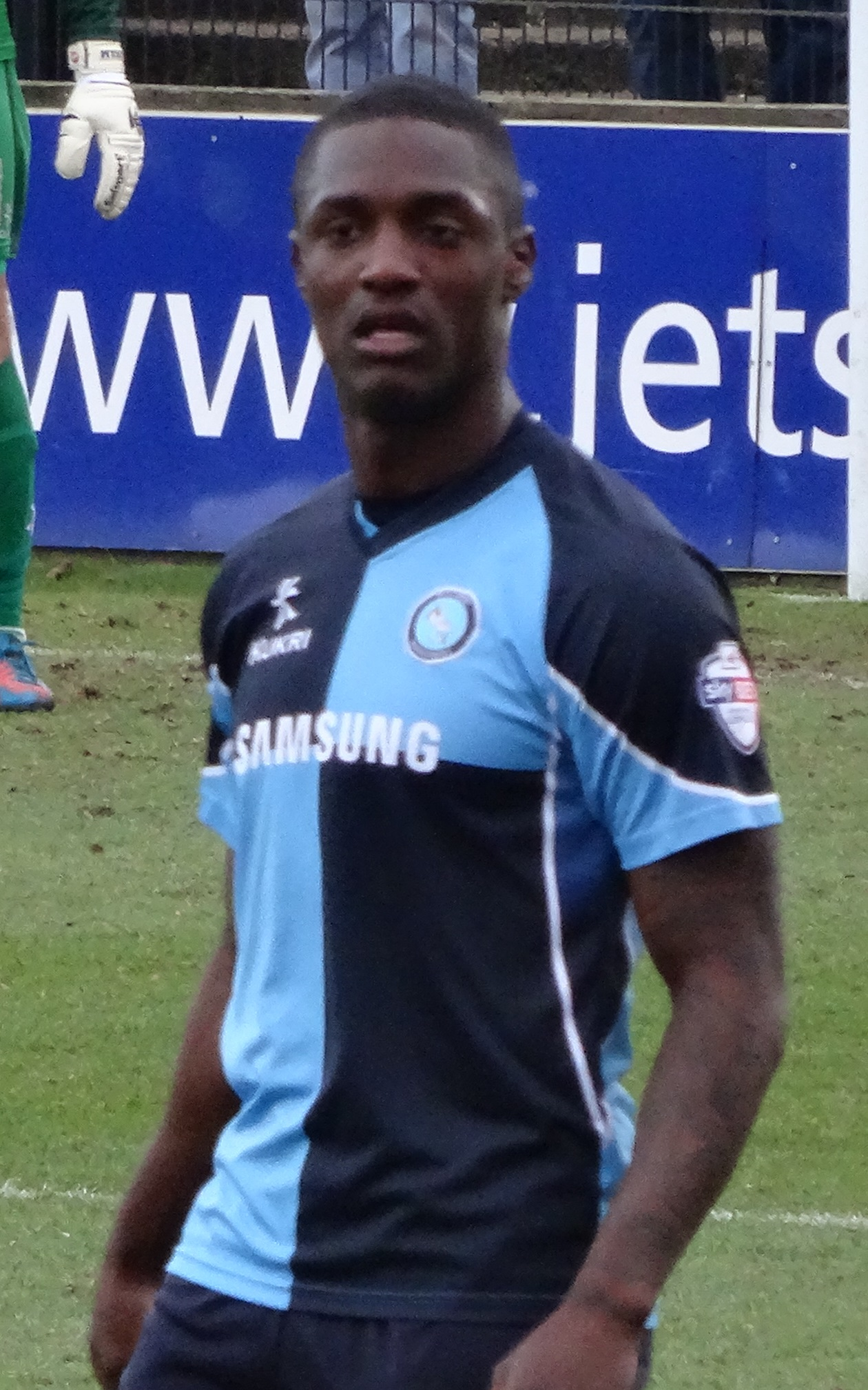
Anthony Stewart (pictured in 2014) opened the scoring for Wycombe early in the first half.

Wycombe Wanderers kicked the game off at around 7:30 p.m. On 6 minutes, a volley from Oxford's Browne from outside the penalty area went high and wide of the goal. Three minutes later, Wycombe took the lead: Jacobson curled in the first corner of the game and Anthony Stewart's header found the back of Oxford's net, making it 1–0. In the 16th minute, Henry passed to Taylor, who headed it down into the Wycombe area but failed to find any of his teammates. Three minutes after, Onyedinma's shot was collected by Eastwood at the second attempt, before Sam Long's strike for Oxford went wide. In the 23rd minute, the game was temporarily halted for a drinks break. In the 29th minute, Oxford's Alex Rodríguez received the first yellow card of the game for a foul on Samuel; the resulting free kick came to nothing. Two minutes later, another Jacobson corner was swung into the far post but was cleared by Oxford. Ofoborh then conceded Oxford's first corner which was sent into the area and tipped away by Wycombe's goalkeeper Ryan Allsop. On 37 minutes, a sliding tackle from Stewart intercepted a pass from Henry to Taylor inside the six-yard box, and six minutes later, another long-range effort from Browne went high once again. With a minute of the half remaining, Onyadinma made space for himself before striking wide of the Oxford goal. After three minutes of added-on time, the half was brought to a close with Wycombe leading 1–0.

=== Second half ===
The first two substitutions of the match were made at the beginning of the second half, with Alex Pattison replacing Matt Bloomfield for Wycombe and Rodríguez coming off for Liam Kelly for Oxford. Pattison then made a run but his pass failed to find Onyadinma and on 50 minutes, Browne's ball into the Wycombe box was cleared. Stewart then deflected a cross from Mark Sykes out for a corner. In the 55th minute, a free kick from Jacobson went over the crossbar, and in the following minute Oxford equalised. A cross from Sykes from a tight angle beat Allsop and made it 1–1. Eight minutes later, Henry made a run into the Wycombe box and passed to Taylor whose shot went wide. Wycombe then made two further substitutions in the 64th minute, Akinfenwa and Curtis Thompson replacing Samuel and Ofoborh. Stewart once again made a saving tackle to deny Taylor before Allsop saved an attempt from Robert Dickie. After the second-half drinks break, Thompson was booked in the 73rd minute for a foul on Kelly. On 77 minutes, the Oxford goalkeeper Eastwood fouled Onyadinma and a penalty was awarded. Jacobson struck the spot kick down the centre as Eastwood dived to his left, giving Wycombe the lead once again. Oxford responded by making two further substitutions, Anthony Forde and Dan Agyei replacing Long and Henry. Heavy rain began to fall and in the 87th minute a Forde cross was headed into Allsop's hands by Taylor. Agyei and Taylor then combined but Stewart once again denied the chance. On 89 minutes, Ben Woodburn replaced Browne. Five minutes of additional time was indicated and three minutes in, Nick Freeman came on to replace Onyadinma. The match ended 2–1 to Wycombe who were promoted to the EFL Championship for the first time in their 133-year history.

=== Details ===
13 July 2020
19:30 BST

Wycombe Wanderers	2–1	Oxford United
Stewart 9'; Jacobson 79' (pen.)	Report	Sykes 57'

Wembley Stadium, London
Attendance: 0
Referee: Robert Jones

Wycombe Wanderers	Oxford United

GK	1	(England) Ryan Allsop
RB	19	(Scotland) Jack Grimmer
CB	5	(England) Anthony Stewart
CB	21	(England) Darius Charles
LB	3	(Wales) Joe Jacobson
DM	4	(England) Dominic Gape
CM	10	(England) Matt Bloomfield (c)		(substituted off) 46'
CM	28	(Nigeria) Nnamdi Ofoborh		(substituted off) 63'
RF	7	(England) David Wheeler
CF	25	(Wales) Alex Samuel		(substituted off) 62'
LF	23	(Nigeria) Fred Onyedinma		(substituted off) 90+3'
Substitutes:
DF	2	(Portugal) Sido Jombati
MF	8	(England) Alex Pattison		(substituted on) 46'
FW	11	(England) Scott Kashket
DF	16	(United States) Giles Phillips
MF	18	(England) Curtis Thompson	(yellow card) 72'	(substituted on) 63'
FW	20	(England) Adebayo Akinfenwa		(substituted on) 62'
MF	22	(England) Nick Freeman		(substituted on) 90+3'
FW	27	(Antigua and Barbuda) Josh Parker
GK	31	(England) David Stockdale
Manager:
(England) Gareth Ainsworth

GK	1	(England) Simon Eastwood
RB	12	(England) Sam Long		(substituted off) 79'
CB	4	(England) Rob Dickie (c)
CB	5	(England) Elliott Moore
LB	3	(England) Josh Ruffels
CM	18	(Northern Ireland) Mark Sykes
CM	6	(Spain) Alex Rodríguez	(yellow card) 27'	(substituted off) 46'
CM	8	(England) Cameron Brannagan
RF	17	(England) James Henry		(substituted off) 79'
CF	9	(England) Matty Taylor
LF	30	(England) Marcus Browne		(substituted off) 89'
Substitutes:
MF	10	(Wales) Ben Woodburn		(substituted on) 89'
GK	13	(England) Jack Stevens
MF	14	(Republic of Ireland) Anthony Forde		(substituted on) 79'
DF	15	(England) John Mousinho
FW	19	(Scotland) Jamie Mackie
DF	20	(England) Jamie Hanson
FW	23	(England) Dan Agyei		(substituted on) 79'
DF	26	(England) Rob Atkinson
MF	28	(Republic of Ireland) Liam Kelly		(substituted on) 46'
Manager:
(England) Karl Robinson

Statistics
	Wycombe Wanderers	Oxford United
Total shots	5	13
Shots on target	4	5
Corner kicks	2	8
Fouls committed	16	15
Possession	24%	76%
Yellow cards	1	1
Red cards	0	0

== Post-match ==
Jacobson, scorer of the winning goal, reflected on this moment: "It's unbelievable, I was thinking don't miss the penalty, our goalkeeping coach said just go down the middle and I trusted him". Discussing the following season, he noted: "This club has never been here before, every game will be a cup final". Akinfenwa was reflective: "I was lucky and blessed to find players and a manager who believe in me". Ainsworth was objective about his team's playing style: "We can't afford the best footballing players but heart and determination – that was a Wycombe performance ... They ground it out and I can't believe that we're a Championship club". His opposite number, Robinson, was dejected: "We probed and pushed for 95% of the game, but didn't take full advantage ... The game sometimes isn't fair as all the things that were out of our control today, didn't fall for us ... it's two errors from us that will cause us nightmares for weeks to come ... Right now, it feels like one of the lowest moments in my career". Wycombe's Stewart was named the man of the match.
