= 2019–20 Wycombe Wanderers F.C. season =

Wycombe Wanderers
2019–20 season
- Chairman: Trevor Stroud (until 21 February 2020); Rob Couhig (from 21 February 2020)
- Manager: Gareth Ainsworth
- Stadium: Adams Park
- League One: 3rd (on PPG) (promoted via play-offs)
- FA Cup: First round (vs. Tranmere Rovers)
- EFL Cup: First round (vs. Reading)
- EFL Trophy: Group stage
- BBFA Senior Cup: Semi-finals (cancelled)
- Top goalscorer: League: Adebayo Akinfenwa (10 – regular season); Joe Jacobson (11 – including play-offs); All: Joe Jacobson (12)
- Highest home attendance: 8,523 vs. Ipswich Town; 1 January 2020
- Lowest home attendance: 512 vs. Fulham U21s; 5 November 2019 (0 vs. Fleetwood Town; 6 July 2020)
Home colours	Away colours

The 2019–20 season was Wycombe Wanderers' 133rd season in existence and their 27th consecutive season in the Football League. This was the club's second consecutive season in EFL League One. The club earned promotion to the EFL Championship on 13 July 2020, beating Oxford United 2–1 in the 2020 EFL League One play-off final at Wembley Stadium.

== Friendlies ==
=== Pre-season ===
Wycombe Wanderers announced on 13 May 2019 that they will face Barnet and Woking during pre-season. Their full schedule was confirmed on 31 May.

13 July 2019 Friendly	Barnet	1–1	Wycombe Wanderers	Canons Park, London
15:00 BST	Sparkes 53'	Report	Trialist 90'	Stadium: The Hive Stadium; Attendance: 655

16 July 2019 Friendly	Woking	2–3	Wycombe Wanderers	Woking
19:45 BST	Trialist 24', 40'	Report	Samuel 15'; Trialist 57'; Akinfenwa 90'	Stadium: Kingfield Stadium; Attendance: 660

20 July 2019 Friendly	Wycombe Wanderers	2–2	Brentford	High Wycombe
15:00 BST	Trialist 7'; Akinfenwa 28'	Report	Hammar 36'; Marcondes 56'	Stadium: Adams Park; Attendance: 1,595

23 July 2019 Friendly	Wealdstone	0–1	Wycombe Wanderers	Ruislip
19:45 BST		Report	Kashket 2'	Stadium: Grosvenor Vale

26 July 2019 Friendly	Maidenhead United	0–0	Wycombe Wanderers	Maidenhead
19:45 BST				Stadium: York Road

=== Mid-season ===
3 September 2019 Friendly	Brentford B	1–2	Wycombe Wanderers	Osterley
13:00 BST	Mitchell 15'	Report	Parker 13' (pen.); Kashket 71'	Stadium: Jersey Road; Attendance: Behind closed doors

== Competitions ==
=== League One ===
==== League table ====
Pos	Team	Pld	W	D	L	GF	GA	GD	Pts	PPG	Promotion, qualification or relegation
1	Coventry City (C, P)	34	18	13	3	48	30	+18	67	1.97	Promotion to the EFL Championship
2	Rotherham United (P)	35	18	8	9	61	38	+23	62	1.77	Promotion to the EFL Championship
3	Wycombe Wanderers (O, P)	34	17	8	9	45	40	+5	59	1.74	Qualification for League One play-offs (Note: Four teams play for one spot and promotion to the EFL Championship.)
4	Oxford United	35	17	9	9	61	37	+24	60	1.71	Qualification for League One play-offs
5	Portsmouth	35	17	9	9	53	36	+17	60	1.71	Qualification for League One play-offs
6	Fleetwood Town	35	16	12	7	51	38	+13	60	1.71	Qualification for League One play-offs
7	Peterborough United	35	17	8	10	68	40	+28	59	1.69	
8	Sunderland	36	16	11	9	48	32	+16	59	1.64	

Source: EFL Official Website
Rules for classification: 1) Points per game; 2) Goal difference; 3) Number of goals scored; 4) Head-to-head results; 5) Wins; 6) Away goals; 7) Penalty points (sec 9.5); 8) 12-point sending-off offences
(C) Champions; (O) Play-off winners; (P) Promoted

==== Results summary ====
Overall								Home						Away					
Pld	W	D	L	GF	GA	GD	Pts	W	D	L	GF	GA	GD	W	D	L	GF	GA	GD
34	17	8	9	45	40	+5	59	13	3	2	34	20	+14	4	5	7	11	20	−9

Last updated: 29 February 2020.

==== Results by matchday ====
Matchday	1	2	3	4	5	6	7	8	9	10	11	12	13	14	15	16	17	18	19	20	21	22	23	24	25	26	27	28	29	30	31	32	33	34
Ground	H	A	H	A	H	A	H	A	H	H	A	H	H	A	A	H	A	H	A	H	A	A	H	H	A	H	A	H	A	H	H	A	H	A
Result	W	D	W	D	W	D	W	L	D	W	W	D	W	D	W	W	W	W	D	W	L	L	L	D	L	W	L	W	L	W	L	W	W	L
Position	4	4	3	4	3	5	1	3	3	3	2	2	2	3	2	1	1	1	1	1	1	1	1	1	2	2	2	2	2	2	4	3	3	4

Updated to match(es) played on 29 February 2020. Source: Statto.com
A = Away; H = Home; W = Win; D = Draw; L = Loss

==== Matches ====
On Thursday, 20 June 2019, the EFL League One fixtures were revealed.

3 August 2019 1	Wycombe Wanderers	2–0	Bolton Wanderers	High Wycombe
15:00 BST	Smyth 56'; Onyedinma 81'	Report		Stadium: Adams Park; Attendance: 6,454; Referee: Tom Nield

10 August 2019 2	Bristol Rovers	0–0	Wycombe Wanderers	Horfield
15:00 BST	Ogogo (yellow card) 80'	Report	Smyth (yellow card) 47'; El-Abd (yellow card) 77'	Stadium: Memorial Stadium; Attendance: 7,668; Referee: Paul Marsden

17 August 2019 3	Wycombe Wanderers	3–2	Milton Keynes Dons	High Wycombe
15:00 BST	Jacobson 12' (pen.); Onyedinma 37'; Smyth (yellow card) 60'; Phillips (yellow card) 68'; Wheeler (yellow card) 88' (goal) 90'	Report	Bowery 32'; McGrandles (penalty missed) 45+5'; Houghton 51' (pen.)	Stadium: Adams Park; Attendance: 5,243; Referee: Trevor Kettle

20 August 2019 4	Fleetwood Town	1–1	Wycombe Wanderers	Fleetwood
19:45 BST	Clarke (yellow card) 40'; Madden 90'	Report	Phillips (yellow card) 38'; Akinfenwa 57'	Stadium: Highbury Stadium; Attendance: 2,319; Referee: Ollie Yates

24 August 2019 5	Wycombe Wanderers	4–3	Southend United	High Wycombe
15:00 BST	Milligan 36' (o.g.); Kashket 55', 90+2'; Stewart 89'	Report	Goodship 11'; Humphrys 30', 47'; Lennon (yellow card) 43'; Bishop (yellow card) 75'	Stadium: Adams Park; Attendance: 4,196; Referee: Darren Drysdale

31 August 2019 6	AFC Wimbledon	0–0	Wycombe Wanderers	Norbiton
15:00 BST	Reilly (yellow card) 75'; Guinness-Walker (yellow card) 84'; Kalambayi (yellow card) 90+5'	Report		Stadium: Kingsmeadow; Attendance: 4,521; Referee: Alan Young

7 September 2019 7	Wycombe Wanderers	3–1	Lincoln City	High Wycombe
15:00 BST	Jacobson 5', 36', 75'; Allsop (yellow card) 51'	Report	Akinde 50'; Connolly (yellow card) 90+14'	Stadium: Adams Park; Attendance: 5,562; Referee: Chris Sarginson

14 September 2019 8	Gillingham	2–0	Wycombe Wanderers	Gillingham
15:00 BST	Ndjoli 59', 73' (pen.)	Report		Stadium: Priestfield Stadium; Attendance: 4,814; Referee: James Adcock

17 September 2019 9	Wycombe Wanderers	1–1	Accrington Stanley	High Wycombe
19:45 BST	Wheeler (yellow card) 65'; Freeman 72' (pen.); Bloomfield (yellow card) 81'; Akinfenwa (yellow card) 90+3'	Report	Charles 40'; Hughes (yellow card) 48'; Opoku (yellow card) 51'; Clark (yellow card) 71'	Stadium: Adams Park; Attendance: 3,566; Referee: Brett Huxtable

21 September 2019 10	Wycombe Wanderers	1–0	Portsmouth	High Wycombe
15:00 BST	Ofoborh (red card) 54'; Akinfenwa (yellow card) 55' (goal) 82' (pen.)	Report	Harrison (yellow card) 19' (yellow-red card) 57'; Burgess (yellow card) 56'; Pitman (yellow card) 81'	Stadium: Adams Park; Attendance: 7,688; Referee: Seb Stockbridge

28 September 2019 11	Rochdale	0–3	Wycombe Wanderers	Rochdale
15:00 BST	Andrew (yellow card) 50'	Report	Onyedinma 16', 77'; Akinfenwa 26'; Mascoll (yellow card) 90'	Stadium: Spotland Stadium; Attendance: 3,039; Referee: Darren Handley

5 October 2019 12	Wycombe Wanderers	3–3	Peterborough United	High Wycombe
15:00 BST	Thompson (yellow card) 4' (yellow-red card) 83'; Akinfenwa 56', 90+5' (pen.); Pym 63' (o.g.)	Report	Eisa 10'; Maddison (yellow card) 25'; Knight 38'; Blake-Tracy (yellow card) 66'; Toney 70' (yellow card) 90+4'	Stadium: Adams Park; Attendance: 5,083; Referee: Will Finnie

12 October 2019	Ipswich Town	Postponed	Wycombe Wanderers	Ipswich
15:00 BST				Stadium: Portman Road
Note: On 2 October, the match was postponed due to international call-ups.

19 October 2019 13	Wycombe Wanderers	1–0	Sunderland	High Wycombe
15:00 BST	Charles 29'; Wheeler (yellow card) 90+1'	Report	McGeady (yellow card) 82'	Stadium: Adams Park; Attendance: 8,395; Referee: Kevin Johnson

22 October 2019 14	Blackpool	1–1	Wycombe Wanderers	Blackpool
19:45 BST	Heneghan 51' (yellow card) 66'; Husband (yellow card) 68'	Report	Kashket 8'; Jacobson (yellow card) 90'	Stadium: Bloomfield Road; Attendance: 7,298; Referee: Ben Toner

26 October 2019 15	Rotherham United	0–1	Wycombe Wanderers	Rotherham
15:00 BST	Smith (yellow card) 13'; Jones (yellow card) 19'; Crooks (yellow card) 76'; Morris (yellow card) 87'	Report	Kashket 5'; Aarons (yellow card) 7'; Stewart (yellow card) 17'; Pattison (yellow card) 50'	Stadium: New York Stadium; Attendance: 8,337; Referee: Neil Hair

2 November 2019 16	Wycombe Wanderers	1–0	Shrewsbury Town	High Wycombe
15:00 GMT	Aarons 57'	Report	Laurent (yellow card) 64'; Williams (yellow card) 90+2' (yellow-red card) 90+4'	Stadium: Adams Park; Attendance: 4,826; Referee: Brett Huxtable

17 November 2019 17	Tranmere Rovers	0–2	Wycombe Wanderers	Birkenhead
12:00 GMT	Ridehalgh (yellow card) 32'; Potter (yellow card) 65'	Report	Akinfenwa 43'; Jacobson 45+1' (pen.); Grimmer (yellow card) 47'; Thompson (yellow card) 71'	Stadium: Prenton Park; Attendance: 5,460; Referee: John Busby

23 November 2019 18	Wycombe Wanderers	1–0	Doncaster Rovers	High Wycombe
15:00 GMT	Jacobson 90+2' (pen.)	Report	Anderson (red card) 49'; James (yellow card) 90+5'	Stadium: Adams Park; Attendance: 4,875; Referee: Michael Salisbury

26 November 2019 19	Ipswich Town	0–0	Wycombe Wanderers	Ipswich
19:45 GMT	Nolan (yellow card) 31'; Garbutt (yellow card) 34'; Norwood (yellow card) 44'; Donacien (yellow card) 45+4'; Woolfenden (yellow card) 81'	Report	Smyth (yellow card) 45+1'; Stewart (yellow card) 61'; Allsop (yellow card) 79'; Thompson (yellow card) 83'; Jacobson (penalty missed) 87'; Kashket (yellow card) 90'; Akinfenwa (yellow card) 90+2'	Stadium: Portman Road; Attendance: 19,215; Referee: Alan Young

14 December 2019 20	Wycombe Wanderers	2–0	Burton Albion	High Wycombe
15:00 GMT	Wheeler 24'; Thompson (yellow card) 44'; Jombati (yellow card) 45+3'; Bloomfield 90'	Report	Quinn (yellow card) 44'; Buxton (yellow card) 78'	Stadium: Adams Park; Attendance: 5,448; Referee: Neil Hair

21 December 2019 21	Oxford United	1–0	Wycombe Wanderers	Oxford
15:00 GMT	Henry 23'; Rodriguez (yellow card) 27'; Mousinho (yellow card) 27'; Dickie (yellow card) 72'; Sykes (yellow card) 90+3'	Report	Akinfenwa (yellow card) 20' (yellow-red card) 26'; Bloomfield (yellow card) 44'; Ofoborh (yellow card) 90'; Jacobson (yellow card) 90+2'	Stadium: Kassam Stadium; Attendance: 10,123; Referee: Lee Swabey

26 December 2019 22	Portsmouth	2–0	Wycombe Wanderers	Milton
15:00 GMT	Harrison (yellow card) 13'; Curtis (yellow card) 35' (goal) 73'; Naylor (yellow card) 45+3'; Close 66'	Report	Stewart (yellow card) 53'; Aarons (yellow card) 64'; Jacobson (yellow card) 85'	Stadium: Fratton Park; Attendance: 6,786; Referee: John Busby

29 December 2019 23	Wycombe Wanderers	1–4	Coventry City	High Wycombe
15:00 GMT	Akinfenwa 14'; Jombati (yellow card) 16'; Jacobson (yellow card) 23'; Wheeler (yellow card) 73'	Report	McCallum 3'; Godden 16' (pen.), 44', 50'; Hyam (yellow card) 66'; Maroši (yellow card) 81'	Stadium: Adams Park; Attendance: 7,533; Referee: Kevin Johnson

1 January 2020 24	Wycombe Wanderers	1–1	Ipswich Town	High Wycombe
15:00 GMT	Wheeler 66'	Report	Wilson (yellow card) 35'; Norwood 54'; Woolfenden (yellow card) 78'	Stadium: Adams Park; Attendance: 8,523; Referee: Robert Lewis

4 January 2020	Peterborough United	Postponed	Wycombe Wanderers	Peterborough
15:00 GMT				Stadium: London Road
Note: On 1 December, the match was postponed due to Peterborough United's involvement in the third round of the FA Cup.

11 January 2020 25	Sunderland	4–0	Wycombe Wanderers	Monkwearmouth
15:00 GMT	Wyke 6'; Hume 16'; Maguire 21' (pen.), 78' (yellow card) 21'; Lynch (yellow card) 71'		Stewart (yellow card) 20'	Stadium: Stadium of Light; Attendance: 29,331; Referee: Andy Davies

18 January 2020 26	Wycombe Wanderers	2–1	Rochdale	High Wycombe
15:00 GMT	McCarthy 31'; Charles (yellow card) 80'; Jacobson 90+4' (pen.)	Report	Henderson 18'; Dooley (yellow card) 75'; Andrew (yellow card) 79'	Stadium: Adams Park; Attendance: 4,498; Referee: Craig Hicks

21 January 2020 27	Peterborough United	4–0	Wycombe Wanderers	Peterborough
19:45 GMT	Toney 23' (pen.), 73'; Butler (yellow card) 26'; Taylor (yellow card) 40' (goal) 56'; Dembélé 44'; Beevers (yellow card) 61'	Report	Phillips (red card) 21'; Bloomfield (yellow card) 45+2'	Stadium: Weston Homes Stadium; Attendance: 3,851; Referee: Charles Breakspear

25 January 2020	Coventry City	Postponed	Wycombe Wanderers	Bordesley
15:00 GMT				Stadium: St Andrew's
Note: On 14 January, the match was postponed due to Coventry City's involvement in the fourth round of the FA Cup.

28 January 2020 28	Wycombe Wanderers	2–1	Blackpool	High Wycombe
19:45 GMT (Note: Wycombe Wanderers v Blackpool's kick-off was delayed until 20:50 GMT due to a medical emergency.)	Freeman 5'; Samuel 9'; Stockdale (yellow card) 90'	Report	Heneghan (yellow card) 67'; Dewsbury-Hall 86'	Stadium: Adams Park; Attendance: 3,684; Referee: Trevor Kettle

1 February 2020 29	Milton Keynes Dons	2–0	Wycombe Wanderers	Denbigh
15:00 GMT	Lewington (yellow card) 14'; Healey 68'; Gladwin 86'	Report	Smyth (yellow card) 65'; Stewart (yellow card) 89'	Stadium: Stadium MK; Attendance: 9,699; Referee: Darren Handley

8 February 2020 30	Wycombe Wanderers	3–1	Bristol Rovers	High Wycombe
15:00 GMT	Akinfenwa 9' (yellow card) 59'; Charles 39'; Bloomfield 41'; Thompson (yellow card) 71'	Report	Mitchell-Lawson 27'; Clarke-Harris (yellow card) 45+1'; Clarke (yellow card) 65'; Craig (yellow card) 78'; Kilgour (yellow card) 87'	Stadium: Adams Park; Attendance: 5,769; Referee: Tom Nield

11 February 2020 31	Wycombe Wanderers	0–1	Fleetwood Town	High Wycombe
19:45 GMT	McCarthy (yellow card) 79'; Jacobson (yellow card) 90'; Smyth (yellow card) 90+1'	Report	Connolly (yellow card) 14'; Evans (red card) 68'; Madden 75'; Saunders (yellow card) 90+7'	Stadium: Adams Park; Attendance: 3,286; Referee: Kevin Johnson

15 February 2020 32	Bolton Wanderers	0–2	Wycombe Wanderers	Middlebrook
15:00 GMT	Emmanuel (yellow card) 40'; Nsiala (yellow card) 59'; Matthews (yellow card) 61'; Fleming (yellow card) 63'	Report	Nsiala 44' (o.g.); Jacobson 62' (pen.); Allsop (yellow card) 77'; Gape (yellow card) 86'	Stadium: University of Bolton Stadium; Attendance: 11,737; Referee: Graham Salisbury

22 February 2020 33	Wycombe Wanderers	3–1	Tranmere Rovers	High Wycombe
15:00 GMT	Stewart 45+1'; Thompson (yellow card) 55'; Akinfenwa 71'; Jacobson 90+2' (pen.)	Report	McCullough (yellow card) 29'; Cook (yellow card) 31'; Vaughan 63'; Clarke (yellow card) 66'; Davies (yellow card) 90+1'	Stadium: Adams Park; Attendance: 4,756; Referee: Charles Breakspear

29 February 2020 34	Doncaster Rovers	3–1	Wycombe Wanderers	Doncaster
15:00 GMT	Sadlier (yellow card) 13' (goal) 71'; Ennis 45'; Anderson (yellow card) 62'; McCarthy 83' (o.g.)	Report	Thompson (yellow card) 20'; Akinfenwa 67'	Stadium: Keepmoat Stadium; Attendance: 7,522; Referee: David Rock

14 March 2020	Burton Albion	Cancelled	Wycombe Wanderers	Burton upon Trent
15:00 GMT				Stadium: Pirelli Stadium
Note: The match was postponed on 13 March 2020 due to the COVID-19 pandemic. On 9 June, League One clubs voted by a majority to formally end the 2019–20 season.

21 March 2020	Wycombe Wanderers	Cancelled	Oxford United	High Wycombe
15:00 GMT				Stadium: Adams Park
Note: The match was postponed on 13 March 2020 due to the COVID-19 pandemic. On 9 June, League One clubs voted by a majority to formally end the 2019–20 season.

24 March 2020	Coventry City	Cancelled	Wycombe Wanderers	Bordesley
19:45 GMT				Stadium: St Andrew's
Note: The match was postponed on 13 March 2020 due to the COVID-19 pandemic. On 9 June, League One clubs voted by a majority to formally end the 2019–20 season.

28 March 2020	Shrewsbury Town	Cancelled	Wycombe Wanderers	Shrewsbury
15:00 GMT				Stadium: New Meadow
Note: The match was postponed on 13 March 2020 due to the COVID-19 pandemic. On 9 June, League One clubs voted by a majority to formally end the 2019–20 season.

4 April 2020	Wycombe Wanderers	Cancelled	Rotherham United	High Wycombe
15:00 GMT				Stadium: Adams Park
Note: On 3 April, the English Football League decided to postpone all football until safe to do so due to the COVID-19 pandemic. On 9 June, League One clubs voted by a majority to formally end the 2019–20 season.

10 April 2020	Southend United	Cancelled	Wycombe Wanderers	Southend-on-Sea
15:00 BST				Stadium: Roots Hall
Note: On 3 April, the English Football League decided to postpone all football until safe to do so due to the COVID-19 pandemic. On 9 June, League One clubs voted by a majority to formally end the 2019–20 season.

13 April 2020	Wycombe Wanderers	Cancelled	AFC Wimbledon	High Wycombe
15:00 BST				Stadium: Adams Park
Note: On 3 April, the English Football League decided to postpone all football until safe to do so due to the COVID-19 pandemic. On 9 June, League One clubs voted by a majority to formally end the 2019–20 season.

18 April 2020	Lincoln City	Cancelled	Wycombe Wanderers	Lincoln
15:00 BST				Stadium: Sincil Bank
Note: On 3 April, the English Football League decided to postpone all football until safe to do so due to the COVID-19 pandemic. On 9 June, League One clubs voted by a majority to formally end the 2019–20 season.

25 April 2020	Wycombe Wanderers	Cancelled	Gillingham	High Wycombe
15:00 BST				Stadium: Adams Park
Note: On 3 April, the English Football League decided to postpone all football until safe to do so due to the COVID-19 pandemic. On 9 June, League One clubs voted by a majority to formally end the 2019–20 season.

3 May 2020	Accrington Stanley	Cancelled	Wycombe Wanderers	Accrington
12:00 BST				Stadium: Crown Ground
Note: On 3 April, the English Football League decided to postpone all football until safe to do so due to the COVID-19 pandemic. On 9 June, League One clubs voted by a majority to formally end the 2019–20 season.

==== League One play-offs ====
On 9 June 2020, League One clubs voted by an overwhelming majority to curtail the 2019–20 season early due to the COVID-19 pandemic in the United Kingdom. It was announced the same day that the play-offs would still be played and that positions would be determined on a points per game (PPG) basis. This meant that Wycombe Wanderers finished 3rd in the League One table, thus occupying the first play-off spot.

3 July 2020 Semi-final 1	Fleetwood Town	1–4	Wycombe Wanderers	Fleetwood
19:30 BST	Evans 4' (pen.); Coyle (red card) 33'; Connolly (yellow card) 45+2'; Madden (yellow card) 84' (yellow-red card) 84'	Report	Ofoborh 2'; Jacobson 6' (yellow card) 30' (penalty missed) 34'; Wheeler 45+3'; Samuel 57'	Stadium: Highbury Stadium; Attendance: Behind closed doors (Note: The semi-finals and final were played behind closed doors due to the COVID-19 pandemic in the United Kingdom.); Referee: Tony Harrington

6 July 2020 Semi-final 2	Wycombe Wanderers	2–2 (6–3 agg.)	Fleetwood Town	High Wycombe
19:30 BST	Thompson (yellow card) 39'; Onyedinma 47', 90+4'	Report	Andrew 22'; Evans 60' (pen.)	Stadium: Adams Park; Attendance: Behind closed doors Referee: Darren Bond

13 July 2020 Final	Oxford United	1–2	Wycombe Wanderers	Wembley
19:30 BST	Rodríguez (yellow card) 27'; Sykes 57'	Report	Stewart 9'; Thompson (yellow card) 72'; Jacobson 79' (pen.)	Stadium: Wembley Stadium; Attendance: Behind closed doors Referee: Robert Jones

=== FA Cup ===
The first round draw was made on 21 October 2019.

9 November 2019 First round	Tranmere Rovers	2–2	Wycombe Wanderers	Birkenhead
15:00 GMT	Morris 3', 67'	Report	Jacobson 26'; Samuel 55'; Charles (yellow card) 86'	Stadium: Prenton Park; Attendance: 3,849; Referee: Martin Coy

20 November 2019 First round replay	Wycombe Wanderers	1–2 (a.e.t.)	Tranmere Rovers	High Wycombe
19:45 GMT	Stewart 45'; Phillips (yellow card) 98'	Report	Ferrier (yellow card) 32' (goal) 55'; Wilson (red card) 41'; Davies (yellow card) 57'; Monthé (yellow card) 71'; Morris 115'	Stadium: Adams Park; Attendance: 2,928; Referee: Graham Salisbury

=== EFL Cup ===
The first round draw was made on 20 June.

13 August 2019 First round	Wycombe Wanderers	1–1 (2–4 p)	Reading	High Wycombe
19:45 BST	Samuel 59'	Report	Pușcaș 63'	Stadium: Adams Park; Attendance: 4,802; Referee: Darren England
	Penalties
	Gape (penalty scored); Freeman (penalty missed); Pattison (penalty scored); Onyedinma (penalty missed)		Pușcaș (penalty scored); Baldock (penalty scored); Swift (penalty scored); Loader (penalty scored)

=== EFL Trophy ===
On 9 July 2019, the group-stage draw was announced with invited clubs drawn on 12 July 2019.

Pos	Div	Team	Pld	W	PW	PL	L	GF	GA	GD	Pts	Qualification
1	L1	Milton Keynes Dons	3	2	0	0	1	5	2	+3	6	Advance to Round 2
2	L2	Stevenage	3	1	1	0	1	2	4	−2	5	Advance to Round 2
3	ACA	Fulham U21	3	1	0	1	1	3	3	0	4	
4	L1	Wycombe Wanderers	3	1	0	0	2	3	4	−1	3	

Source: EFL.com

8 October 2019 Group Game 1	Wycombe Wanderers	0–1	Stevenage	High Wycombe
19:45 BST	Ofoborh (yellow card) 57'	Report	Cowley 6'; Carter (yellow card) 62'; Guthrie (yellow card) 80'; Farman (yellow card) 87'; Denton (yellow card) 90'	Stadium: Adams Park; Attendance: 766; Referee: Josh Smith

5 November 2019 Group Game 2	Wycombe Wanderers	1–2	Fulham U21	High Wycombe
19:45 GMT	Aarons 50'	Report	Harris 10'; Abraham 83'	Stadium: Adams Park; Attendance: 512; Referee: Christopher Pollard

12 November 2019 Group Game 3	Milton Keynes Dons	1–2	Wycombe Wanderers	Denbigh
19:45 GMT	Boateng (yellow card) 29'; Dickenson 32' (yellow card) 54'; Agard (red card) 88'	Report	Ofoborh (yellow card) 25' (goal) 58'; Smyth (yellow card) 55'; Gardiner-Smith (yellow card) 70'; Phillips (red card) 88'; Parker 90+1'	Stadium: Stadium MK; Attendance: 1,101; Referee: David Rock

=== Berks & Bucks FA Senior Cup ===
On 13 August 2019, Wycombe Wanderers confirmed that they would take part in the BBFA Senior Cup for the first time since 2014 having won it 29 times. Since they are a League (EFL) member, they were given a bye to the Quarter Finals. The draw was made after the 2nd round matches had been completed, with Wycombe Wanderers being drawn against Hungerford Town of the National League South. Wycombe won 3–0 against Hungerford to set up a tie with Spartan South Midlands Premier Division side Newport Pagnell Town On 17 April 2020, the Berks & Bucks Football Association announced that the competition had been cancelled and all results would be expunged due to the 2019–20 COVID-19 pandemic.

25 February 2020 Quarter-final	Hungerford Town	0–3	Wycombe Wanderers	Hungerford
19:45 GMT		Report	Ofoborh 35'; Freeman 52'; Wates 70'	Stadium: Bulpit Lane

Semi-final	Newport Pagnell Town	Cancelled	Wycombe Wanderers	Newport Pagnell
				Stadium: Willen Road

== Team details ==
=== Squad information ===
No.	Nationality	Name	Age	Joined club (Note: Year that player became a Wycombe first-team player. If a player has played more than one spell at Wycombe, the beginning of the most recent spell is used.)
GOALKEEPERS
1	(England)	Ryan Allsop	33	2018
13	(Scotland)	Cameron Yates	27	2018
31	(England)	David Stockdale†	40	2020
DEFENDERS
2	(Portugal)	Sido Jombati	38	2014
3	(Wales)	Joe Jacobson	39	2014
5	(England)	Anthony Stewart	33	2015
15	(England)	Jamie Mascoll	29	2019
16	(United States)	Giles Phillips†	28	2019
19	(Scotland)	Jack Grimmer	32	2019
21	(England)	Darius Charles	38	2019
MIDFIELDERS
4	(England)	Dominic Gape	31	2016
7	(England)	David Wheeler	35	2019
8	(England)	Alex Pattison	28	2019
10	(England)	Matt Bloomfield	42	2003
18	(England)	Curtis Thompson	32	2018
22	(England)	Nick Freeman	30	2016
24	(England)	Jacob Gardiner-Smith	28	2019
28	(Nigeria)	Nnamdi Ofoborh†	26	2019
FORWARDS
9	(Scotland)	Craig Mackail-Smith	42	2017
11	(England)	Scott Kashket	30	2016
17	(Northern Ireland)	Paul Smyth†	28	2019
20	(England)	Adebayo Akinfenwa	44	2016
23	(Nigeria)	Fred Onyedinma	29	2019
25	(Wales)	Alex Samuel	30	2018
27	(Antigua and Barbuda)	Josh Parker	35	2019

† Loan player

=== Appearances and goals ===
As of 13 July 2020

No.	Pos	Nat	Player	Total		League One		FA Cup		EFL Cup		EFL Trophy		League One play-offs	
No.	Pos	Nat	Player	Apps	Goals	Apps	Goals	Apps	Goals	Apps	Goals	Apps	Goals	Apps	Goals
1	GK	(England) ENG	Ryan Allsop	38	0	32	0	2	0	1	0	0	0	3	0
2	DF	(Portugal) POR	Sido Jombati	11	0	7	0	1	0	0	0	3	0	0	0
3	DF	(Wales) WAL	Joe Jacobson	36	12	30	9	1	1	0	0	2	0	3	2
4	MF	(England) ENG	Dominic Gape	35	0	28	0	2	0	1	0	1	0	3	0
5	DF	(England) ENG	Anthony Stewart	40	4	34	2	2	1	1	0	0	0	3	1
7	MF	(England) ENG	David Wheeler	38	4	31	3	1	0	1	0	2	0	3	1
8	MF	(England) ENG	Alex Pattison	25	0	17	0	2	0	1	0	2	0	3	0
9	FW	(Scotland) SCO	Craig Mackail-Smith	0	0	0	0	0	0	0	0	0	0	0	0
10	MF	(England) ENG	Matt Bloomfield	31	2	27	2	1	0	0	0	0	0	3	0
11	FW	(England) ENG	Scott Kashket	25	4	19	4	1	0	1	0	3	0	1	0
13	GK	(Scotland) SCO	Cameron Yates	3	0	0	0	0	0	0	0	3	0	0	0
15	DF	(England) ENG	Jamie Mascoll	9	0	4	0	1	0	1	0	3	0	0	0
16	DF	(United States) USA	Giles Phillips	16	0	11	0	1	0	1	0	3	0	0	0
17	FW	(Northern Ireland) NIR	Paul Smyth	21	1	19	1	1	0	0	0	1	0	0	0
18	MF	(England) ENG	Curtis Thompson	27	0	21	0	2	0	0	0	1	0	3	0
19	DF	(Scotland) SCO	Jack Grimmer	24	0	18	0	1	0	1	0	1	0	3	0
20	FW	(England) ENG	Adebayo Akinfenwa	39	10	32	10	2	0	1	0	1	0	3	0
21	DF	(England) ENG	Darius Charles	29	2	25	2	1	0	0	0	0	0	3	0
22	MF	(England) ENG	Nick Freeman	34	2	26	2	2	0	1	0	2	0	3	0
23	MF	(Nigeria) NGA	Fred Onyedinma	17	6	13	4	0	0	1	0	0	0	3	2
24	MF	(England) ENG	Jacob Gardiner-Smith	3	0	0	0	0	0	0	0	3	0	0	0
25	FW	(Wales) WAL	Alex Samuel	29	4	21	1	2	1	1	1	2	0	3	1
27	FW	(Antigua and Barbuda) ATG	Josh Parker	18	1	13	0	1	0	1	0	3	1	0	0
28	MF	(Nigeria) NGA	Nnamdi Ofoborh	25	2	18	0	1	0	0	0	3	1	3	1
31	GK	(England) ENG	David Stockdale	2	0	2	0	0	0	0	0	0	0	0	0
Players who left the club before the end of the season:
6	DF	(Egypt) EGY	Adam El-Abd	2	0	2	0	0	0	0	0	0	0	0	0
26	FW	(England) ENG	Rolando Aarons	13	2	10	1	1	0	0	0	2	1	0	0
30	DF	(England) ENG	Paco Craig	0	0	0	0	0	0	0	0	0	0	0	0
26	DF	(England) ENG	Jason McCarthy	9	1	9	1	0	0	0	0	0	0	0	0

== Transfers ==
=== Transfers in ===
Date	Position	Nationality	Name	From	Fee	Ref.
9 July 2019	CM	(England)	Alex Pattison	(England) Middlesbrough	Free transfer	
22 July 2019	DM	(England)	Jacob Gardiner-Smith	(England) Hendon	Free transfer	
22 July 2019	RB	(Scotland)	Jack Grimmer	(England) Coventry City	Free transfer	
23 July 2019	LB	(England)	Jamie Mascoll	(England) Charlton Athletic	Free transfer	
30 July 2019	RM	(Nigeria)	Fred Onyedinma	(England) Millwall	Undisclosed	
30 July 2019	RW	(England)	David Wheeler	(England) Queens Park Rangers	Free transfer	
1 August 2019	CF	(Antigua and Barbuda)	Josh Parker	(England) Charlton Athletic	Free transfer	
15 August 2019	CB	(England)	Darius Charles	Free agent	Free transfer	
25 February 2020	CB	(England)	Paco Craig	(United States) Louisville City	Free transfer	

=== Loans in ===
Date from	Position	Nationality	Name	From	Date until	Ref.
19 July 2019	CF	(Northern Ireland)	Paul Smyth	(England) Queens Park Rangers	14 July 2020	
22 July 2019	CB	(United States)	Giles Phillips	(England) Queens Park Rangers	14 July 2020	
2 September 2019	LM	(England)	Rolando Aarons	(England) Newcastle United	13 January 2020	
2 September 2019	CM	(Nigeria)	Nnamdi Ofoborh	(England) AFC Bournemouth	14 July 2020	
18 January 2020	RB	(England)	Jason McCarthy	(England) Millwall	1 June 2020	
24 January 2020	GK	(England)	David Stockdale	(England) Birmingham City	14 July 2020	

=== Transfers out ===
Date	Position	Nationality	Name	To	Fee	Ref.
1 July 2019	DM	(Jamaica)	Marcus Bean	Retired	Released	
1 July 2019	CB	(England)	Darius Charles	Free agent	Released	
1 July 2019	RW	(England)	Paris Cowan-Hall	(England) Colchester United	Released	
1 July 2019	CB	(England)	Ben Frempah	(England) Wingate & Finchley	Released	
1 July 2019	RB	(Republic of Ireland)	Michael Harriman	(England) Northampton Town	Released	
1 July 2019	GK	(Democratic Republic of the Congo)	Yves Ma-Kalambay	Free agent	Released	
1 July 2019	CF	(England)	Nathan Tyson	(England) Notts County	Released	
30 July 2019	RB	(England)	Jason McCarthy	(England) Millwall	Undisclosed	
2 September 2019	CB	(Egypt)	Adam El-Abd	(England) Stevenage	Mutual consent	
26 March 2020	CB	(England)	Paco Craig	Free agent	Released	

=== Loans out ===
Date from	Position	Nationality	Name	To	Date until	Ref.
19 July 2019	CF	(Scotland)	Craig Mackail-Smith	(England) Stevenage	9 June 2020	(Note: On 17 January 2020, Craig Mackail-Smith's loan spell was extended until the end of the season.)
24 December 2019	DM	(England)	Jacob Gardiner-Smith	(England) Braintree Town	24 March 2020	
