= Darius Charles =

English footballer (born 1987)

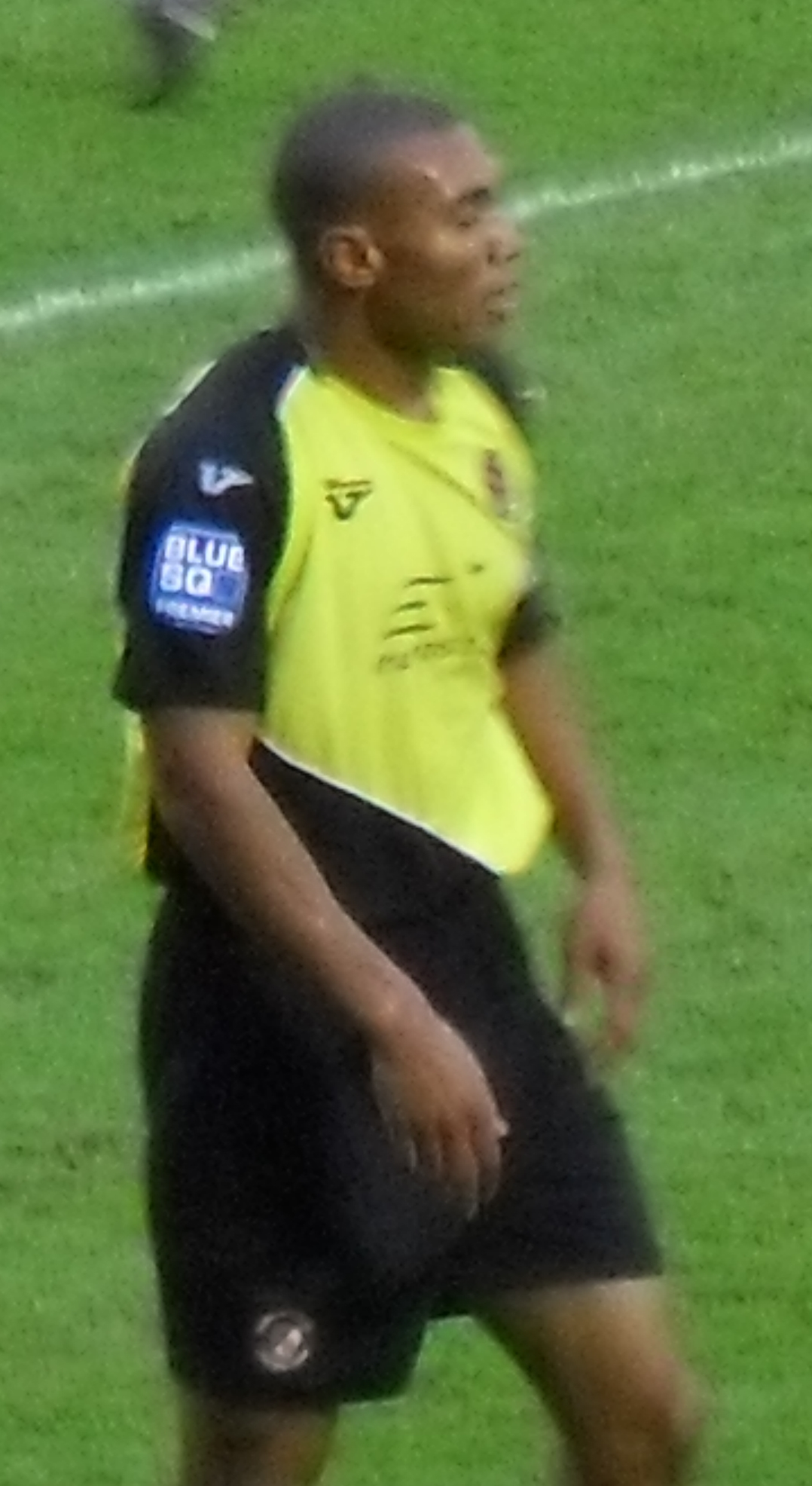
- Charles playing for Ebbsfleet United in 2009

Personal information
- Full name: Wesley Darius Donald Charles
- Date of birth: 10 December 1987 (age 38)
- Place of birth: Ealing, England
- Height: 6 ft 1 in (1.85 m)
- Position: Centre-back

Youth career
- Greenford Celtic
- 1998–2006: Brentford

Senior career*
Years	Team	Apps	(Gls)
2004–2009	Brentford	37	(1)
2006	→ Thurrock (loan)	1	(0)
2006	→ Yeading (loan)	6	(0)
2006	→ Staines Town (loan)	2	(0)
2007	→ Crawley Town (loan)	6	(0)
2007	→ Sutton United (loan)	7	(0)
2008	→ Ebbsfleet United (loan)	9	(0)
2008–2009	→ Ebbsfleet United (loan)	21	(0)
2009–2010	Ebbsfleet United	55	(0)
2010–2015	Stevenage	144	(13)
2015–2016	Burton Albion	0	(0)
2016	→ AFC Wimbledon (loan)	9	(0)
2016–2018	AFC Wimbledon	65	(2)
2018–2021	Wycombe Wanderers	35	(2)
2021–2022	AFC Wimbledon	0	(0)

International career
2009	England C	2	(0)

Managerial career
- 2022: AFC Wimbledon (caretaker)
- * Club domestic league appearances and goals as of 23:55, 11 April 2022 (UTC)

Wesley Darius Donald Charles (born 10 December 1987) is an English former professional footballer who played as a centre-back. He played in the English Football League for Brentford, Stevenage, Burton Albion, AFC Wimbledon, and Wycombe Wanderers.

Charles started his career after progressing through the Brentford youth system and he made his first-team debut in 2005. He was loaned out by Brentford on seven occasions and he joined the last of these, Ebbsfleet United, permanently in 2009 in a historic transfer. Six months later, a proposed transfer to York City fell through, after he decided against moving to the city. He spent another season with Ebbsfleet before signing for Stevenage in 2010.

== Club career ==
=== Brentford ===
Charles first played football aged 11 while at school, for Greenford Celtic. He later played for Drayton Manor before signing for the Centre of Excellence at Brentford at age 10. He made his first-team debut as a left midfielder in a 2–1 victory over Hull City on 7 May 2005; the final day of the 2004–05 season. He made his first appearance of 2005–06 in the Football League Trophy against Oxford United, which finished as a 1–1 draw after extra time and a 4–3 defeat in a penalty shoot-out, while Charles played as a left-back. His first league appearance of the season came as an 88th minute substitute in a 1–1 draw with Chesterfield on 10 December 2005. He went on to play as a 32nd-minute substitute in a 3–3 draw with Bradford City on 2 January 2006, which proved to be his final appearance of the season for Brentford, which he finished with three appearances. In mid January 2006, he signed a one-year professional contract with a one-year option, effective from June 2006. He was loaned out to Conference South club Thurrock on 3 February 2006, where he made one appearance, in a 1–0 defeat to Weston-super-Mare. He was subsequently sent out to Yeading on 16 March 2006 on a work experience deal, and he made his debut in a 2–1 defeat to Eastbourne Borough, before finishing the loan spell with six appearances.

After having made nine appearances for Brentford during 2006–07, he signed for Staines Town of the Isthmian League Premier Division on 16 October 2006 on a one-month loan. He made two appearances for Staines before returning to Brentford in November 2006. He joined Conference National club Crawley Town on 9 February 2007 on loan until the end of April. He made his debut a day later after coming on as a 72nd-minute substitute in a 2–2 draw with St Albans City. He finished the loan spell with six appearances. He played for Brentford on five further occasions, which included scoring the winning goal in the 89th minute of a 4–3 victory over Port Vale, and he finished the season with 19 Brentford appearances. Brentford took up their option for his contract to be extended for another season in May 2007, before he signed a new two-year contract with the option of another year with the club in June. He signed for Sutton United of the Conference South on 2 August 2007 on an initial three-month loan. He made his debut in a 1–0 defeat to Basingstoke Town. He was recalled by Brentford in September 2007, after making seven appearances for Sutton. He made his first appearance for Brentford of 2007–08 in a 2–0 victory over Chester City on 22 September 2007.

=== Ebbsfleet United ===
He joined Conference Premier club Ebbsfleet United on 21 March 2008 on loan until the end of the season, having made 18 appearances for Brentford up to that point in 2007–08. Charles made his Ebbsfleet debut the following day as a 78th-minute substitute in a 3–1 defeat to Stevenage Borough. He started in the following match, a 2–1 victory over Cambridge United, and he finished the loan spell with nine appearances. He made one more appearance for Brentford in 2007–08, in a 1–0 away defeat to Stockport County on 3 May 2008, finishing the season with 19 appearances for the club.

Charles re-signed for Ebbsfleet on 21 June after joining on loan for 2008–09. He fouled Simon Brown to concede a penalty kick against Wrexham on 13 September 2008, which was scored by Brown, as Ebbsfleet lost 3–2. He was sent off for a second bookable offence late into a 1–0 defeat to Histon on 6 October 2008. After his Brentford contract was cancelled he moved to Ebbsfleet permanently on 29 January 2009, after the owners of Ebbsfleet, MyFootballClub, ratified a compensation fee of £25,000, making this the first transfer in football history to be decided by a group of members. He finished the season with 44 appearances and was named Ebbsfleet's Player of the Year.

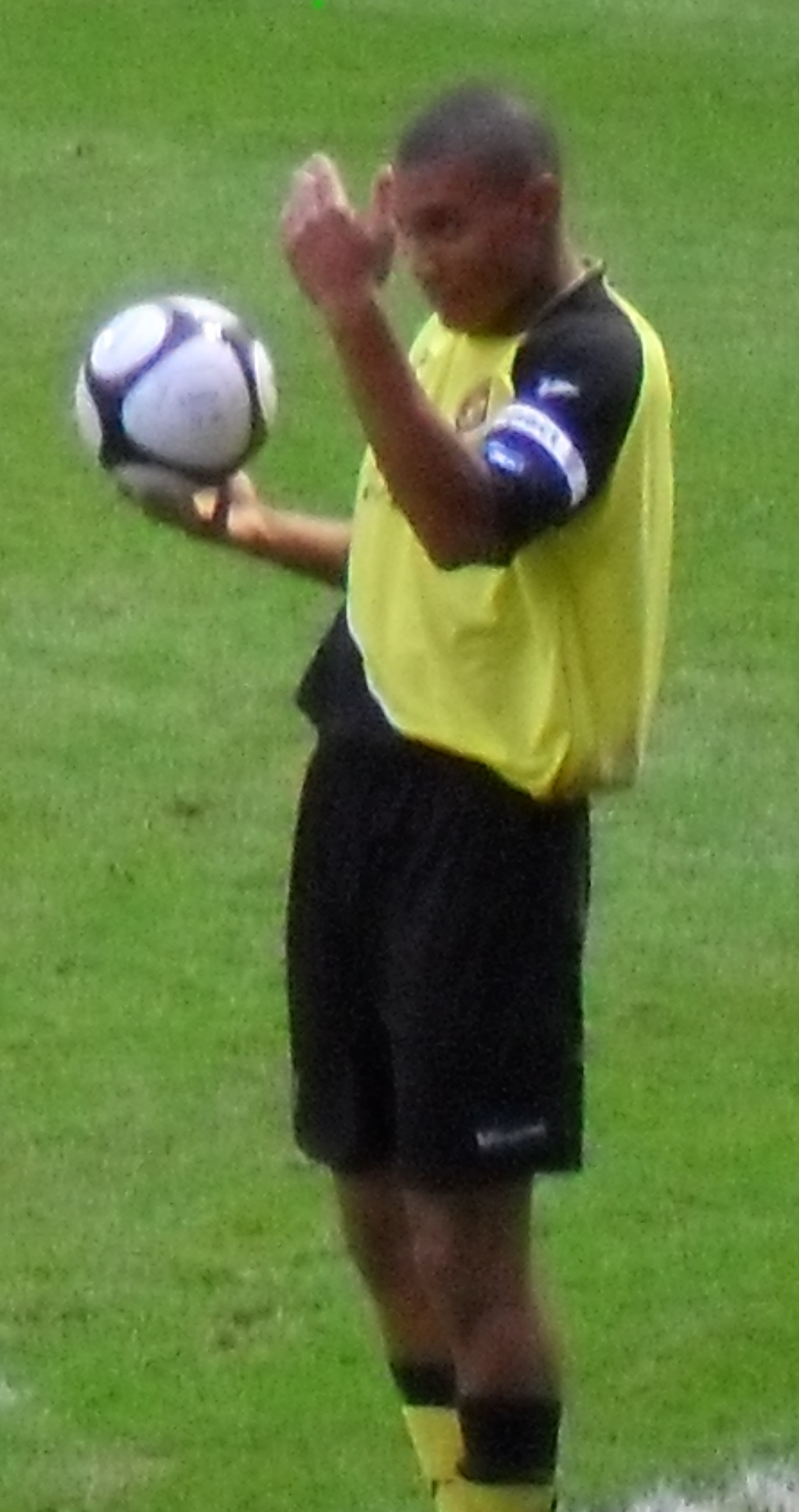
Charles playing for Ebbsfleet United in 2009

Conference Premier rivals York City made a £10,000 bid for Charles in June, which was subsequently rejected, with MyFootballClub members voting against the offer with over a 98% majority. Following this, York manager Martin Foyle said it was unlikely they would increase their offer for Charles. Ebbsfleet later agreed to sell Charles and striker Michael Gash for a combined fee of £80,000 to an unnamed club, which was revealed to be York and he was reported to have signed on 29 June 2009. However, the deal eventually fell through after Charles decided against joining the club as he did not want to relocate to York. Shortly after Ebbsfleet received an enquiry about him from an unnamed League Two club, although nothing came of this interest. He later became Ebbsfleet captain and was sent off for dissent in a 1–0 defeat to Tamworth on 21 November 2009. He made 42 appearances for Ebbsfleet during the 2009–10 as they were relegated to the Conference South.

=== Stevenage ===
Charles turned down a new contract with Ebbsfleet to sign for newly promoted League Two club Stevenage on a two-year contract for a compensation fee on 18 May 2010. He made his debut in a 3–1 home victory against Stockport, playing 78 minutes. Charles scored his first goal for the club in an FA Cup first round replay against Milton Keynes Dons in November 2010, equalising in stoppage time to take the match to extra time and a penalty shoot-out, which Stevenage won 7–6. The following month, he was sent off for a professional foul ten minutes after coming on as a substitute in a 1–0 defeat to Northampton Town. Charles was utilised as a centre-forward during the 2011 League Two play-off final, providing the assist for John Mousinho's match-winning goal in a 1–0 victory over Torquay United that secured promotion to League One. He made 33 appearances during the 2010–11 season, scoring four goals.

After starting Stevenage's first two matches of the 2011–12 season, Charles signed a contract extension on 11 August 2011, keeping him contracted to the club until 2013. A knee injury limited his involvement for the remainder of the year, though he returned to the starting line-up in an FA Cup third round tie against Reading on 7 January 2012, scoring the only goal in a 1–0 victory at the Madejski Stadium. Charles sustained a hamstring injury in Stevenage's 1–1 draw with Wycombe Wanderers on 31 March 2012, with the injury ruling him out for the rest of the season. He made 34 appearances across the season, scoring five goals. Ahead of the 2012–13 season, Charles signed a new two-year contract. Predominantly used in defence, he made 41 appearances during the season.

With a year remaining on his deal, Charles' contract was extended for a further year in June 2013. He began the 2013–14 season with a goal in a 4–3 opening-day defeat to Oldham Athletic, but sustained an injury later that month in a League Cup tie against Everton, ruling him out until January 2014. He made 26 appearances and scored five goals that season, as Stevenage were relegated to League Two. Charles remained a regular during the 2014–15 season, making 33 appearances and scoring three times, before a broken leg sustained in a goalless draw with Bury on 10 February 2015 ended his season. He departed the club upon the expiry of his contract in June 2015, having made 167 appearances and scored 18 goals during his five-year spell.

=== Burton Albion ===
Charles signed for newly promoted League One club Burton Albion on a one-year contract on 19 June 2015. Having failed to appear for Burton, he joined League Two club AFC Wimbledon on 17 March 2016 on loan until the end of 2015–16. Charles started for AFC Wimbledon as they beat Plymouth Argyle 2–0 at Wembley Stadium in the 2016 League Two play-off final, meaning they were promoted to League One for the first time.

=== AFC Wimbledon ===
Charles signed for AFC Wimbledon permanently on 31 May 2016 after a successful loan spell at the club. He scored his first goal for the club in a 2–1 loss to Scunthorpe United on 16 August 2016.

=== Wycombe Wanderers ===
Charles signed for newly promoted League One club Wycombe Wanderers on 15 June 2018 on a one-year contract. He was released by Wycombe at the end of the 2018–19 season, before re-signing for the club on 15 August 2019 on a short-term deal until January 2020. He was praised by Wycombe manager Gareth Ainsworth for his attitude upon his return. Charles signed a new one-and-a-half-year contract with Wycombe on 10 January 2020. He played in Wycombe's 2–1 win over Oxford in the 2020 League One play-off final at Wembley, as the club was promoted to the Championship for the first time. He was released by Wycombe at the end of the 2020–21 season.

=== Return to AFC Wimbledon ===
Charles re-signed for League One club AFC Wimbledon on 3 July 2021. Initially signed in a player-mentoring role, he was elevated into a first team coaching role in January 2022. On 29 March 2022, following the departure of Mark Robinson, Charles took temporary charge of the club as caretaker manager. Charles returned to his previous roles the following day however following the appointment of Mark Bowen. On 11 April 2022, Charles announced his retirement from football at the age of 34.

== International career ==
Charles was named in the England national C team, who represent England at non-League level, in May 2009, for the final of the 2007–2009 International Challenge Trophy against Belgium. He started the match on 19 May to make his debut as England were beaten 1–0. Charles was called up to the team for a friendly against the Poland Olympic team in November 2009, and started the match as England won 2–1. This was the final of his two caps for England C.

Charles, who is of Grenadian descent, received a call-up to the Grenadian national team in November 2017. He turned it down to focus on club football, but stated he hoped to be called up again in the future. He again turned down a call-up to Grenada in October 2018, stating that he did not want to take any risks having only just recovered from an injury and was still regaining match fitness, although he again stated that would be interested in representing the country at international level in the future.

== Style of play ==
Charles' preferred position is centre-back, although he can also play as a left-back, left midfielder or centre-forward.

== Personal life ==
Charles was born in Ealing, Greater London. His footballing hero when growing up was Ronaldo, and this was because he could "change any game with one bit of genius". He supports Manchester United, and states that the 1999 UEFA Champions League Final between Manchester United and Bayern Munich was the best match he has ever watched. Charles' former partner was pregnant as of July 2009.

== Career statistics ==
As of match played 12 March 2022

Appearances and goals by club, season and competition
Club	Season	League			FA Cup		League Cup		Other		Total	
Club	Season	Division	Apps	Goals	Apps	Goals	Apps	Goals	Apps	Goals	Apps	Goals
Brentford	2004–05	League One	1	0	0	0	0	0	0	0	1	0
Brentford	2005–06	League One	2	0	0	0	0	0	1 (Note: Appearance(s) in EFL Trophy)	0	3	0
Brentford	2006–07	League One	17	1	—		2	0	—		19	1
Brentford	2007–08	League Two	17	0	2	0	—		—		19	0
Brentford	Total		37	1	2	0	2	0	1	0	42	1
Thurrock (loan)	2005–06	Conference South	1	0	—		—		—		1	0
Yeading (loan)	2005–06	Conference South	6	0	—		—		—		6	0
Staines Town (loan)	2006–07	Isthmian League Premier Division	2	0	—		—		—		2	0
Crawley Town (loan)	2006–07	Conference National	6	0	—		—		—		6	0
Sutton United (loan)	2007–08	Conference South	7	0	—		—		—		7	0
Ebbsfleet United (loan)	2007–08	Conference Premier	9	0	—		—		—		9	0
Ebbsfleet United	2008–09	Conference Premier	36	0	3	0	—		5 (Note: One appearance in Conference League Cup, four in FA Trophy)	0	44	0
Ebbsfleet United	2009–10	Conference Premier	40	0	1	0	—		1 (Note: Appearance in FA Trophy)	0	42	0
Ebbsfleet United	Total		85	0	4	0	—		6	0	95	0
Stevenage	2010–11	League Two	28	2	2	2	0	0	3 (Note: Appearances in League Two play-offs)	0	33	4
Stevenage	2011–12	League One	28	4	4	1	1	0	1	0	34	5
Stevenage	2012–13	League One	37	1	1	0	2	0	1	0	41	1
Stevenage	2013–14	League One	22	4	2	1	2	0	0	0	26	5
Stevenage	2014–15	League Two	29	2	2	1	1	0	1	0	33	3
Stevenage	Total		144	13	11	5	6	0	6	0	167	18
Burton Albion	2015–16	League One	0	0	0	0	0	0	0	0	0	0
AFC Wimbledon (loan)	2015–16	League Two	9	0	—		—		3	0	12	0
AFC Wimbledon	2016–17	League One	34	2	2	0	1	0	0	0	37	2
AFC Wimbledon	2017–18	League One	31	0	3	0	0	0	1	0	35	0
AFC Wimbledon	Total		74	2	5	0	1	0	4	0	84	2
Wycombe Wanderers	2018–19	League One	5	0	0	0	1	0	1	0	7	0
Wycombe Wanderers	2019–20	League One	25	2	1	0	—		3 (Note: Appearances in League One play-offs)	0	29	2
Wycombe Wanderers	2020–21	Championship	5	0	1	0	1	0	—		7	0
Wycombe Wanderers	Total		35	2	2	0	2	0	4	0	43	2
AFC Wimbledon	2021–22	League One	0	0	0	0	0	0	2	0	2	0
AFC Wimbledon	Total		74	2	5	0	1	0	6	0	86	2
Career total			397	18	24	5	11	0	23	0	455	23

== Honours ==
Stevenage

- Football League Two play-offs: 2011

AFC Wimbledon

- Football League Two play-offs: 2016

Wycombe Wanderers

- EFL League One play-offs: 2020

Individual

- Ebbsfleet United Player of the Year: 2008–09
