= Curtis Thompson (footballer) =

English footballer

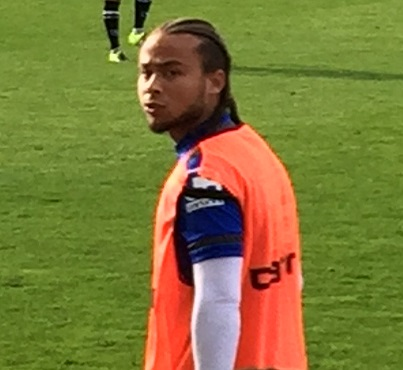
- Thompson as a substitute for Notts County in 2015

Personal information
- Full name: Curtis Liam Thompson
- Date of birth: 2 September 1993 (age 33)
- Place of birth: Nottingham, England
- Height: 5 ft 9 in (1.74 m)
- Position: Defensive midfielder

Team information
- Current team: Spalding United

Youth career
- 2005–2009: Leicester City
- 2009–2011: Notts County

Senior career*
Years	Team	Apps	(Gls)
2011–2018	Notts County	83	(2)
2011	→ Lincoln City (Note: Soccerbase incorrectly credits Curtis Thompson with eight league appearances for Lincoln, however seven of these actually belong to Tyrone Thompson.) (loan)	1	(0)
2012	→ Ilkeston (loan)	6	(0)
2018	→ Wycombe Wanderers (loan)	7	(0)
2018–2023	Wycombe Wanderers	127	(3)
2023–2024	Cheltenham Town	19	(0)
2024–2025	Grimsby Town	35	(2)
2025–	Spalding United	0	(0)
- * Club domestic league appearances and goals as of 16:15, 4 May 2025 (UTC)

Curtis Liam Thompson (born 2 September 1993) is an English professional footballer who plays as a defensive midfielder for National League North club Spalding United. He has previously played for Notts County, Wycombe Wanderers, Cheltenham Town and Grimsby Town.

== Career ==
=== Notts County ===
Born in Nottingham, Thompson started his career at the age of 12 when he signed for Leicester City. He played for the club for four years before he was released in 2009 after not being offered a scholarship. He subsequently signed a two-year scholarship with Notts County. In summer 2011, he signed an 18-month professional contract. He made his professional debut on 4 October 2011, in a 3–1 defeat to Chesterfield in the Football League Trophy, replacing Mike Edwards as a substitute. On 21 October 2011, he joined Conference Premier side Lincoln City, under the caretaker-manager Grant Brown, on an initial one-month youth loan, debuting later that day as an 88th-minute substitute for Josh O'Keefe in the club's 2–0 league defeat at Cambridge United. This was Thompson's only appearance for the club as three days later David Holdsworth was appointed manager of the Red Imps and he elected to cut-short Thompson's loan.

In November 2012, he joined Ilkeston on a one-month loan deal.

He was released by Notts County at the end of the 2017–18 season.

=== Wycombe Wanderers ===
On 26 January 2018, Thompson joined Wycombe Wanderers on loan until the end of the 2017–18 season.

On 14 July 2018 before the kick-off of a pre-season friendly against West Ham United, it was announced Thompson had signed a five-month contract with League One club Wycombe Wanderers after a short loan spell at the end of the previous season. On 4 January 2019, Thompson signed a new two-and-a-half-year contract with Wycombe until 2021. He was awarded the Players' Player of the Year Award for the 2018/19 season.

=== Cheltenham Town ===
On 3 August 2023, Thompson signed for fellow League One side Cheltenham Town on a one-year deal following a successful trial period.

=== Grimsby Town ===
On 1 February 2024, Thompson joined League Two club Grimsby Town on a free transfer, signing an 18-month deal.

In May 2025, Grimsby announced Thompson would be leaving the club.

=== Spalding United ===
On July 30 2025, Thompson joined Southern League Premier Division Central team Spalding United.

== Career statistics ==
As of match played 12 April 2025

Club statistics
Club	Season	League			FA Cup		League Cup		Other		Total	
Club	Season	Division	Apps	Goals	Apps	Goals	Apps	Goals	Apps	Goals	Apps	Goals
Notts County	2011–12	League One	0	0	0	0	0	0	1 (Note: Appearance(s) in Football League Trophy)	0	1	0
Notts County	2012–13	League One	2	0	0	0	0	0	0	0	2	0
Notts County	2013–14	League One	11	0	1	0	1	0	2	0	15	0
Notts County	2014–15	League One	31	0	1	0	1	0	4	0	37	0
Notts County	2015–16	League Two	26	2	0	0	1	0	0	0	27	2
Notts County	2016–17	League Two	13	0	1	0	0	0	0	0	14	0
Notts County	2017–18	League Two	0	0	0	0	1	0	3 (Note: Appearance(s) in EFL Trophy)	0	4	0
Notts County	Total		83	2	3	0	4	0	10	0	100	2
Lincoln City (loan)	2011–12	Conference Premier	1	0	0	0	—		0	0	1	0
Ilkeston (loan)	2012–13	Northern Premier League; Premier Division	6	0	0	0	—		0	0	6	0
Wycombe Wanderers (loan)	2017–18	League Two	7	0	0	0	0	0	0	0	7	0
Wycombe Wanderers	2018–19	League One	39	1	1	0	2	0	3	0	45	1
Wycombe Wanderers	2019–20	League One	21	0	2	0	0	0	4 (Note: One appearance in EFL Trophy; three appearances in League One play-offs)	0	27	0
Wycombe Wanderers	2020–21	Championship	33	0	1	0	0	0	—		34	0
Wycombe Wanderers	2021–22	League One	28	2	2	0	1	0	2	0	33	2
Wycombe Wanderers	2022–23	League One	6	0	0	0	0	0	0	0	6	0
Wycombe Wanderers	Total		134	3	6	0	3	0	9	0	152	3
Cheltenham Town	2023–24	League One	19	0	1	0	1	0	1	0	22	0
Grimsby Town	2023–24	League Two	16	2	0	0	0	0	0	0	16	2
Grimsby Town	2024–25	League Two	19	0	0	0	0	0	1	0	20	0
Grimsby Town	Total		35	2	0	0	0	0	1	0	36	2
Career total			278	7	10	0	8	0	21	0	317	7

== Honours ==
Wycombe Wanderers

- EFL League One play-offs: 2020
