= Fred Onyedinma =

Nigerian footballer (born 1996)

- Onyedinma with Wycombe Wanderers in 2026

Personal information
- Full name: Wilfred Oluwafemi Onyedinma
- Date of birth: 24 November 1996 (age 29)
- Place of birth: Lagos, Nigeria
- Height: 1.85 m (6 ft 1 in)
- Positions: Wing-back; midfielder; winger

Team information
- Current team: Wycombe Wanderers
- Number: 44

Youth career
- 2008–2014: Millwall

Senior career*
Years	Team	Apps	(Gls)
2014–2019	Millwall	120	(8)
2014–2015	→ Wycombe Wanderers (loan)	25	(8)
2018–2019	→ Wycombe Wanderers (loan)	21	(4)
2019–2021	Wycombe Wanderers	56	(7)
2021–2024	Luton Town	54	(3)
2023–2024	→ Rotherham United (loan)	17	(2)
2024–	Wycombe Wanderers	91	(18)
- * Club domestic league appearances and goals as of 11 October 2026 (UTC)

Wilfred Oluwafemi Onyedinma (born 24 November 1996) is a Nigerian professional footballer who plays for EFL League One side Wycombe Wanderers in his fourth spell with the club. A versatile player, he can be deployed as a wing-back, defensive midfielder, wide midfielder or winger.

== Early life ==
Onyedinma was born in Lagos, Nigeria, and his parents moved the family to England, along with his brother and two sisters, when Fred was aged three. He grew up in Greenwich, Plumstead and Woolwich, and attended Corelli College in Kidbrooke. He played local football, representing the Blackheath district as a youngster alongside Alex Iwobi, Joe Gomez and Kasey Palmer, before he was spotted by Millwall scout and former player Andy Massey, and subsequently signed for the club at the age of 12.

== Career ==
=== Early career ===
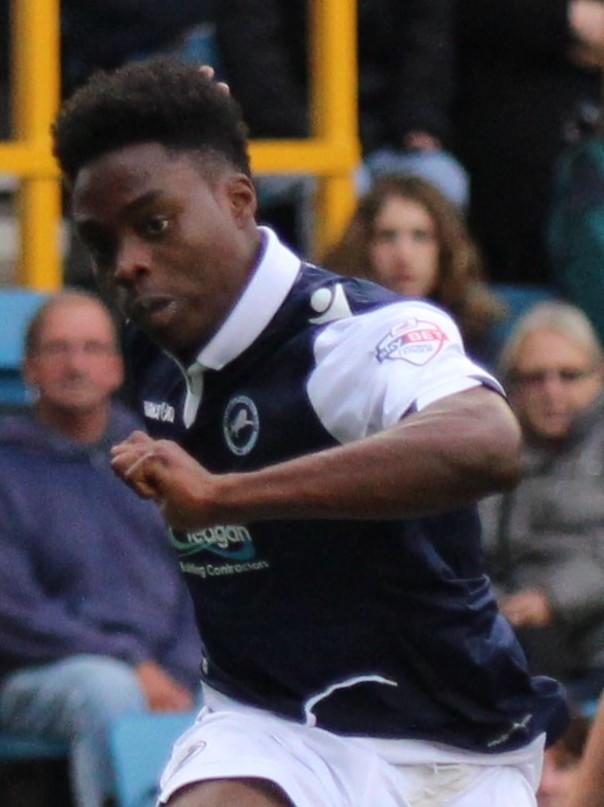
Onyedinma in 2015 with Millwall

Onyedinma made his senior debut for Millwall on 4 January 2014 in the FA Cup against Southend United. He came on as a 62nd-minute substitute for Richard Chaplow as Millwall lost 4–1. He later made his full debut against Charlton Athletic and was named man of the match.

=== Wycombe Wanderers ===
On 27 November 2014, Onyedinma joined League Two outfit Wycombe Wanderers on a loan deal, lasting until January 2015. On 31 December 2014, his loan spell at Wycombe was extended to the end of the 2014–15 season as part of the Paris Cowan-Hall transfer deal.

On 30 August 2018, Onyedinma rejoined Wycombe Wanderers – this time in League One – on loan until 1 January 2019. After returning to Millwall in January 2019 for the remainder of the season, Onyedinma found first-team opportunities hard to come by despite praise for his performances in training from manager Neil Harris.

On 30 July 2019, it was confirmed that Onyedinma would be returning to Wycombe for a third stint, this time on a permanent three-year deal for an undisclosed fee.

On 6 July 2020, Onyedinma scored twice in the second leg of Wycombe's League One play-off semi-final match against Fleetwood Town to secure a 2–2 draw and a 6–3 win on aggregate. In the final against Oxford United on 13 July, Onyedinma won the penalty that led to Wycombe's match-winning goal, securing promotion to the Championship for the first time in the club's history.

=== Luton Town ===
Onyedinma signed for Championship club Luton Town for an undisclosed fee on 25 May 2021. He scored and assisted a further two goals on his debut for the club, a 3–0 victory over Peterborough on 7 August 2021.

He was an 84th-minute substitute in the 2023 EFL Championship play-off final as Luton beat Coventry City in a penalty shoot-out after a 1–1 draw to secure promotion to the Premier League.

On 28 July 2023, Onyedinma joined Rotherham United on a season-long loan, but was recalled from his loan in January 2024, having been injured since November. Following his return from injury, he returned to the Luton team as a substitute in defeat to Tottenham Hotspur on 30 March before starting the following match against Arsenal. He made 8 Premier League appearances in total for Luton. On 24 May 2024, Luton announced he would be leaving in the summer when his contract expired,

=== Return to Wycombe Wanderers ===
On 10 September 2024, Onyedinma signed for Wycombe Wanderers, beginning his fourth separate stint with the club.

On 26 June 2026, Onyedinma signed a new contract with the club.

== Career statistics ==
As of match played 2 May 2026

Appearances and goals by club, season and competition
Club	Season	League			FA Cup		League Cup		Other		Total	
Club	Season	Division	Apps	Goals	Apps	Goals	Apps	Goals	Apps	Goals	Apps	Goals
Millwall	2013–14	Championship	4	0	1	0	0	0	—		5	0
Millwall	2014–15	Championship	2	0	0	0	2	0	—		4	0
Millwall	2015–16	League One	34	4	2	0	1	0	6 (Note: Five appearances in Football League Trophy, one appearance in League One play-offs)	0	43	4
Millwall	2016–17	League One	42	3	6	0	2	1	4 (Note: Four appearances in EFL Trophy, one appearance in League One play-offs)	2	54	6
Millwall	2017–18	Championship	37	1	3	1	2	0	—		42	2
Millwall	2018–19	Championship	1	0	—		2	0	—		3	0
Millwall	Total		120	8	12	1	9	1	10	2	151	12
Wycombe Wanderers (loan)	2014–15	League Two	25	8	—		—		2 (Note: Appearances in League Two play-offs)	0	27	8
Wycombe Wanderers (loan)	2018–19	League One	21	4	1	0	—		2 (Note: Appearance(s) in EFL Trophy)	0	24	4
Wycombe Wanderers	2019–20	League One	13	4	—		1	0	3 (Note: Appearances in League One play-offs)	2	17	6
Wycombe Wanderers	2020–21	Championship	43	3	2	2	1	0	—		46	5
Wycombe Wanderers	Total		56	7	2	2	2	0	3	2	63	11
Luton Town	2021–22	Championship	29	3	2	0	0	0	—		31	3
Luton Town	2022–23	Championship	17	0	2	0	0	0	2 (Note: Appearances in Championship play-offs)	0	21	0
Luton Town	2023–24	Premier League	8	0	0	0	0	0	—		8	0
Luton Town	Total		54	3	4	0	0	0	2	0	60	3
Rotherham United (loan)	2023–24	Championship	17	2	0	0	2	0	—		19	2
Wycombe Wanderers	2024–25	League One	39	6	3	0	1	0	3 (Note: One appearance in EFL Trophy, two appearances in League One play-offs)	0	46	6
Wycombe Wanderers	2025–26	League One	43	10	2	0	2	0	1	0	48	10
Wycombe Wanderers	Total		82	16	5	0	3	0	4	0	94	16
Career total			375	48	27	3	16	1	23	4	438	56

== Honours ==
Millwall

- EFL League One play-offs: 2017

Wycombe Wanderers

- EFL League One play-offs: 2020

Luton Town

- EFL Championship play-offs: 2023
