= Alex Pattison =

English footballer (born 1997)

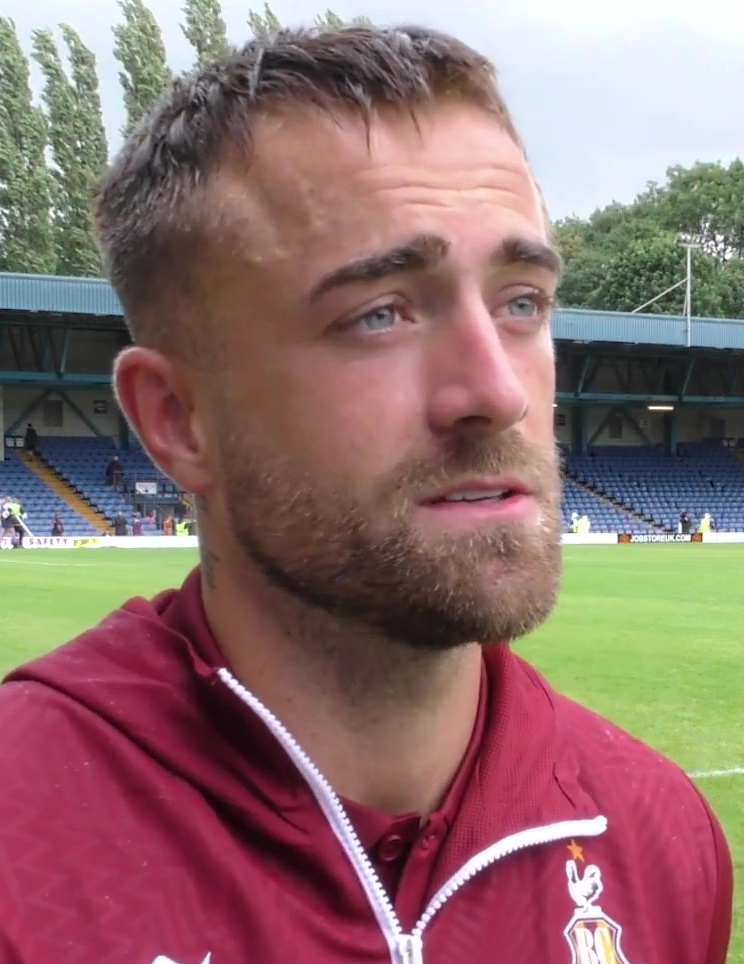
- Pattison with Bradford City in 2023

Personal information
- Full name: Alexander Antony Pattison
- Date of birth: 6 September 1997 (age 29)
- Place of birth: Darlington, England
- Height: 5 ft 8 in (1.73 m)
- Position: Defensive midfielder

Team information
- Current team: Walsall
- Number: 23

Youth career
- 2006–2017: Middlesbrough

Senior career*
Years	Team	Apps	(Gls)
2017–2019	Middlesbrough	0	(0)
2017–2018	→ York City (loan)	4	(0)
2018	→ York City (loan)	8	(0)
2018–2019	→ Yeovil Town (loan)	29	(0)
2019–2021	Wycombe Wanderers	23	(0)
2021–2023	Harrogate Town	77	(18)
2023–2026	Bradford City	50	(10)
2026–	Walsall	17	(1)
- * Club domestic league appearances and goals as of 22:09, 28 August 2026 (UTC)

Alexander Antony Pattison (born 6 September 1997) is an English professional footballer who plays as defensive midfielder for EFL League Two club Walsall. He has previously played in the English Football League for Yeovil Town, Wycombe Wanderers, Harrogate Town and Bradford City.

== Career ==
=== Early life and career ===
Alexander Antony Pattison was born on 6 September 1997 in Darlington, County Durham. He joined Middlesbrough's academy at the age of nine. He established himself as a regular in the under-18 and under-23 teams before training with the first team and taking part in their pre-season preparations in 2016. He played in two of the under-23s' three matches in the 2016–17 EFL Trophy as they were eliminated in the group stage.

Pattison joined National League North club York City on 12 December 2017 on a one-month youth loan. After joining, he stated that he hoped his performances at York would help him secure a transfer to an English Football League (EFL) club in the January transfer window. Pattison made his debut on 16 December when starting in a 2–1 defeat away to Kidderminster Harriers in the FA Trophy. He was named as The Press' Player of the Month for December, despite having made only two league appearances for York by that time. Pattison returned to Middlesbrough upon the expiration of the loan, having made five appearances for York in all competitions.

He returned to York on 8 February 2018 on loan for the rest of the 2017–18 season, having been unable to find a move to a club in the EFL. He made his second debut two days later when starting York's 1–0 home win over Salford City, with manager Martin Gray complimenting his performance and stating that "he's come back at the right time to strengthen us". He started regularly for York before a hamstring injury sustained on 14 April during a 1–0 defeat away to Gainsborough Trinity saw him miss the rest of the season. He finished his second loan at York with eight appearances, with the team finishing in 11th place in the National League North.

Pattison joined League Two club Yeovil Town on 3 August 2018 on loan for the 2018–19 season. He made his debut on 11 August as a 56th-minute substitute in a 2–2 draw at home to Mansfield Town. He was released by Middlesbrough at the end of the 2018–19 season.

=== Wycombe Wanderers ===
Pattison signed for League One club Wycombe Wanderers on 9 July 2019 on a one-year contract. Pattison made his debut for the club on the opening day of the season as Wycombe won 2–0 against Bolton Wanderers and would go on to make another 16 league appearances before the season was prematurely ended due to the COVID-19 pandemic, Wycombe moving into the play-off places as the table was decided on a points-per-game basis. Pattison came off of the bench in both legs of the 6–3 semi final aggregate victory over Fleetwood Town before coming on as a substitute at half-time in the final as Wycombe beat Oxford United to win promotion to the second tier for the first time in their history.

In his first season, Pattison triggered an appearance-based extension in his contract that saw him stay at the club for a second season.

=== Harrogate Town ===
On 26 May 2021, Pattison signed for League Two club Harrogate Town.

=== Bradford City ===
Pattison signed for League Two club Bradford City on 21 June 2023 on a three-year contract. He made his first appearance following injury on 3 December 2024, appearing as a substitute.

=== Walsall ===
On 7 January 2026, Pattison returned to League Two, joining Walsall on an eighteen-month deal for an undisclosed fee.

== Career statistics ==
As of 2 May 2026

Appearances and goals by club, season and competition
Club	Season	League			FA Cup		EFL Cup		Other		Total	
Club	Season	Division	Apps	Goals	Apps	Goals	Apps	Goals	Apps	Goals	Apps	Goals
Middlesbrough U23	2016–17	—			—		—		2 (Note: Appearance(s) in EFL Trophy)	0	2	0
York City (loan)	2017–18	National League North	12	0	—		—		1 (Note: Appearance in FA Trophy)	0	13	0
Yeovil Town (loan)	2018–19	League Two	29	0	1	0	1	0	3	0	34	0
Wycombe Wanderers	2019–20	League One	17	0	1	0	1	0	5 (Note: Two appearances in EFL Trophy, three in League One play-offs)	0	24	0
Wycombe Wanderers	2020–21	Championship	6	0	0	0	0	0	—		6	0
Wycombe Wanderers	Total		23	0	1	0	1	0	5	0	30	0
Harrogate Town	2021–22	League Two	41	9	2	0	0	0	4	1	47	10
Harrogate Town	2022–23	League Two	36	9	2	0	0	0	1	0	39	9
Harrogate Town	Total		77	18	4	0	0	0	5	1	86	19
Bradford City	2023–24	League Two	9	2	0	0	3	1	1	0	13	3
Bradford City	2024–25	League Two	30	7	1	0	0	0	6	0	37	7
Bradford City	2025–26	League One	11	1	1	0	1	0	3	1	16	2
Bradford City	Total		50	10	2	0	4	1	10	1	66	12
Walsall	2025–26	League Two	17	1	1	0	—		1	0	19	1
Career total			208	29	9	0	6	1	27	2	250	32

== Honours ==
Wycombe Wanderers

- EFL League One play-offs: 2020
