= Nick Freeman (footballer) =

English footballer (born 1995)

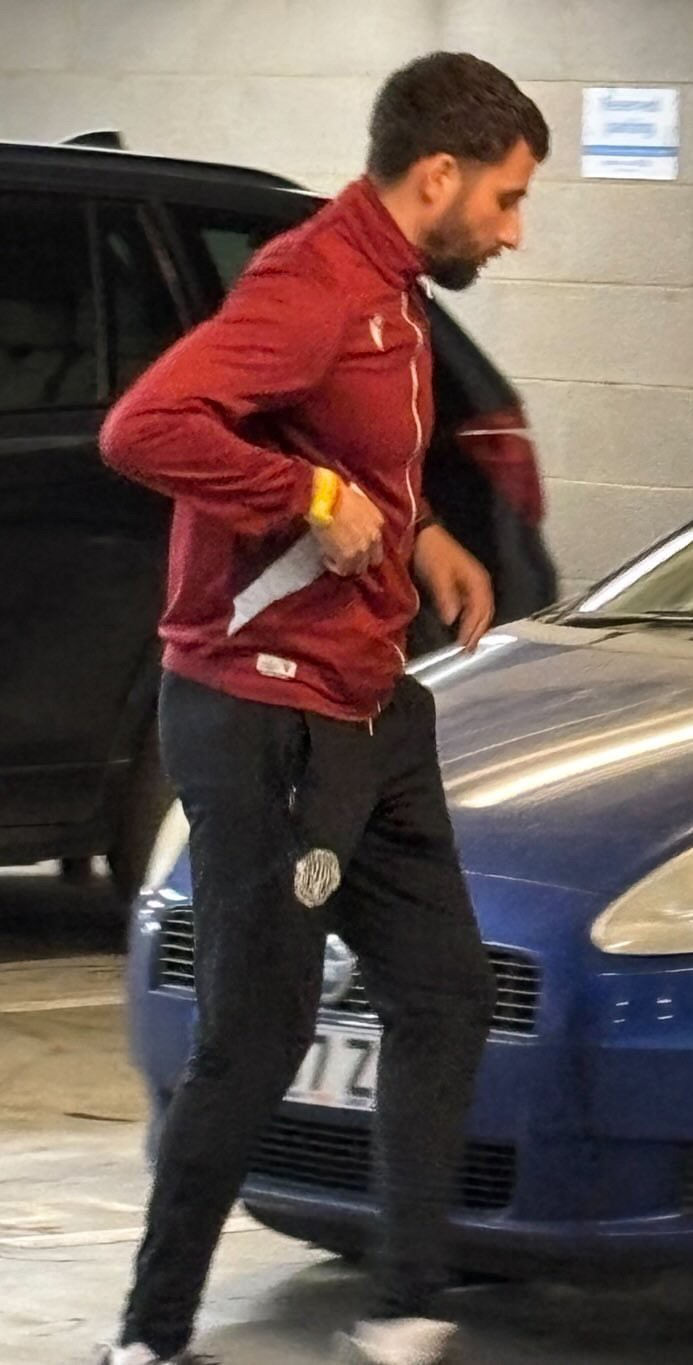
- Nick Freeman in 2025.

Personal information
- Full name: Nicholas Scott Edward Freeman
- Date of birth: 7 November 1995 (age 31)
- Place of birth: Stevenage, England
- Height: 5 ft 11 in (1.80 m)
- Position: Defensive midfielder

Team information
- Current team: Gillingham
- Number: 22

Senior career*
Years	Team	Apps	(Gls)
2012–2015	Histon	111	(23)
2015	Hemel Hempstead Town	1	(0)
2015–2016	Biggleswade Town		
2016–2023	Wycombe Wanderers	147	(7)
2016–2017	→ Wealdstone (loan)	3	(0)
2021	→ Leyton Orient (loan)	11	(0)
2023–2026	Stevenage	71	(3)
2026	Shrewsbury Town	16	(1)
2026–	Gillingham	7	(0)
- * Club domestic league appearances and goals as of 11:15, 22 September 2026 (UTC)

Nicholas Scott Edward Freeman (born 7 November 1995) is an English professional footballer who plays as a defensive midfielder for EFL League Two club Gillingham.

== Career ==
Freeman began his career with non-League teams Histon, Hemel Hempstead Town and Biggleswade Town before having a successful trial at League Two club Wycombe Wanderers in July 2016. He made his professional debut for the Chairboys on 13 August 2016 in a 2–1 victory against Grimsby Town.

His full debut for Wycombe came August 2016 in a 0–0 draw against Blackpool, and scored his first professional goal in the 3–0 EFL Trophy win over West Ham in October 2016, before moving out to Wealdstone on loan.

Able to operate on either flank, Freeman enjoyed more regular first-team football with Wycombe Wanderers in 2017/18, scoring his first EFL goal against Notts County, and would go on to score three more times and contribute two assists in 34 appearances as Wycombe Wanderers earned promotion to League One.

In September 2019 he signed a three-year contract with Wycombe.

On 18 January 2021, Freeman joined League Two side Leyton Orient on loan for the remainder of the 2020–21 season.

Freeman decided to leave Wycombe in pursuit of a new challenge at the end of the 2022–23 season. On 2 June 2023, he agreed to join his hometown club, newly promoted League One side Stevenage.

On 13 January 2026, Freeman joined EFL League Two club Shrewsbury Town on a deal until the end of the season.

On 29 July 2026, Freeman signed for fellow League Two club Gillingham, after a successful trial, following the expiry of his Shrewsbury contract.

== Career statistics ==
As of match played 19 September 2026

Appearances and goals by club, season and competition
Club	Season	League			FA Cup		League Cup		Other		Total	
Club	Season	Division	Apps	Goals	Apps	Goals	Apps	Goals	Apps	Goals	Apps	Goals
Histon	2012–13	National League North	15	2	0	0	—		0	0	15	2
Histon	2013–14	National League North	26	1	0	0	—		0	0	26	1
Histon	2014–15	Southern League Premier Division	37	14	?		—		0	0	37	14
Histon	2015–16	Southern League Premier Division	33	6	1	0	—		2 (Note: Appearance(s) in FA Trophy)	0	36	6
Histon	Total		111	23	1	0	—		2	0	114	23
Hemel Hempstead Town	2015–16	National League South	1	0	0	0	—		0	0	1	0
Wycombe Wanderers	2016–17	League Two	14	0	0	0	0	0	3 (Note: Appearances in the Football League Trophy)	1	17	1
Wycombe Wanderers	2017–18	League Two	27	3	3	1	1	0	3	0	34	4
Wycombe Wanderers	2018–19	League One	27	0	0	0	3	0	3	0	33	0
Wycombe Wanderers	2019–20	League One	26	2	2	0	1	0	5 (Note: Two appearances in the Football League Trophy and three in the League One play-offs)	0	34	2
Wycombe Wanderers	2020–21	Championship	7	0	0	0	1	0	0	0	8	0
Wycombe Wanderers	2021–22	League One	3	0	0	0	1	0	0	0	4	0
Wycombe Wanderers	2022–23	League One	43	2	1	0	2	0	2	0	48	2
Wycombe Wanderers	Total		147	7	6	1	9	0	17	1	178	9
Wealdstone (loan)	2016–17	National League South	3	0	0	0	—		2	0	5	0
Leyton Orient (loan)	2020–21	League Two	11	0	0	0	0	0	0	0	11	0
Stevenage	2023–24	League One	42	3	4	0	1	0	2	0	49	3
Stevenage	2024–25	League One	29	0	2	0	1	0	5	0	37	0
Stevenage	2025–26	League One	0	0	0	0	0	0	0	0	0	0
Stevenage	Total		71	3	6	0	2	0	7	0	86	3
Shrewsbury Town	2025–26	League Two	16	1	0	0	0	0	0	0	16	1
Gillingham	2026–27	League Two	7	0	0	0	1	0	0	0	8	0
Career total			377	34	13	1	12	0	28	1	419	36

== Honours ==
Wycombe Wanderers

- EFL League One play-offs: 2020
