= Giles Phillips =

American professional soccer player

Personal information
- Full name: Giles Ene Malachi Phillips
- Date of birth: June 22, 1997 (age 29)
- Place of birth: Chicago, United States
- Height: 6 ft 3 in (1.90 m)
- Position: Central defender

Team information
- Current team: Eastbourne Borough
- Number: 5

Youth career
- FC Barrington USA
- 2017–2019: Queens Park Rangers

College career
Years	Team	Apps	(Gls)
2015–2016	Carthage College	38	(8)

Senior career*
Years	Team	Apps	(Gls)
2019–2020	Queens Park Rangers	0	(0)
2019–2020	→ Wycombe Wanderers (loan)	11	(0)
2020–2021	Wycombe Wanderers	0	(0)
2020–2021	→ Aldershot Town (loan)	10	(0)
2021	→ Aldershot Town (loan)	8	(0)
2021–2023	Aldershot Town	51	(4)
2023	Waterford	35	(3)
2024	Oxford City	15	(0)
2024–2025	Ebbsfleet United	5	(0)
2024–2025	→ Hornchurch (loan)	14	(0)
2025–2026	Hornchurch	49	(3)
2026–	Eastbourne Borough	11	(0)
- * Club domestic league appearances and goals as of 23:29, October 20, 2026 (UTC)

Giles Ene Malachi Phillips (born June 22, 1997) is an American professional soccer player who plays as a central defender for Isthmian League Premier Division club Eastbourne Borough.

== Career ==
Born in Chicago, Illinois, Phillips joined Queens Park Rangers from FC Barrington USA in June 2017, signing a new contract in February 2019. He had previously played college soccer for Carthage College between 2015 and 2016, becoming their first ever player to sign an international professional contract.

He moved on loan to Wycombe Wanderers in July 2019.

After being released by QPR at the end of the 2019–20 season, Phillips joined Wycombe permanently on August 20, 2020, on a one-year deal.

In November 2020, Phillips joined National League side Aldershot Town on loan until January 2021. On February 23, 2021, Phillips renewed his loan with Aldershot Town for an additional month.

On May 12, 2021, it was announced that Phillips would leave Wycombe Wanderers, having not had his contract renewed.

He returned to Aldershot Town in June 2021 on a two-year contract.

In January 2023 he signed for Irish club Waterford.

Phillips joined Oxford City in February 2024.

In June 2024, following Oxford City's relegation, Phillips joined National League side Ebbsfleet United. In October 2024, he joined National League South club Hornchurch on loan until January 2025. He departed Ebbsfleet by mutual consent on January 6, 2025. On January 8, he joined Hornchurch on a permanent basis.

On July 27, 2026, Phillips joined Isthmian League side Eastbourne Borough.

== Personal life ==
Phillips has an English father and a Nigerian mother.

== Career statistics ==
As of October 24, 2026

Appearances and goals by club, season, and competition
Club	Season	League			FA Cup		EFL Cup		Other		Total	
Club	Season	Division	Apps	Goals	Apps	Goals	Apps	Goals	Apps	Goals	Apps	Goals
Queens Park Rangers	2019–20	Championship	0	0	0	0	0	0	0	0	0	0
Wycombe Wanderers (loan)	2019–20	League One	11	0	1	0	1	0	3 (Note: Appearance(s) in the EFL Trophy.)	0	16	0
Wycombe Wanderers	2020–21	Championship	0	0	0	0	0	0	0	0	0	0
Aldershot Town (loan)	2020–21	National League	18	0	0	0	—		1 (Note: Appearance(s) in the FA Trophy.)	0	19	0
Aldershot Town	2021–22	National League	34	3	1	0	—		1	0	36	3
Aldershot Town	2022–23	National League	17	1	0	0	—		1	0	18	1
Aldershot Town	Total		69	4	1	0	0	0	3	0	73	4
Waterford	2023	LOI Premier Division	35	3	1	0	—		1 (Note: Appearance(s) in League of Ireland Premier Division play-offs)	0	37	3
Oxford City	2023–24	National League	15	0	0	0	—		0	0	15	0
Ebbsfleet United	2024–25	National League	5	0	0	0	—		1 (Note: Appearance(s) in National League Cup)	0	6	0
Hornchurch (loan)	2024–25	National League South	14	0	0	0	—		1	0	15	0
Hornchurch	2024–25	National League South	16	0	0	0	—		0	0	16	0
Hornchurch	2025–26	National League South	33	3	0	0	—		2 (Note: Appearance(s) in National League South play-offs)	0	35	3
Hornchurch	Total		49	3	0	0	0	0	2	0	51	3
Eastbourne Borough	2026–27	IL Premier Division	11	0	4	0	—		3 (Note: Two appearances in FA Trophy, one appearance in Sussex Senior Cup)	0	18	0
Career total			209	10	7	0	1	0	13	0	230	10

== Honors ==
Wycombe Wanderers

- EFL League One play-offs: 2020

Hornchurch

- National League South play-offs: 2026
