= Anthony Stewart (footballer) =

English footballer (born 1992)

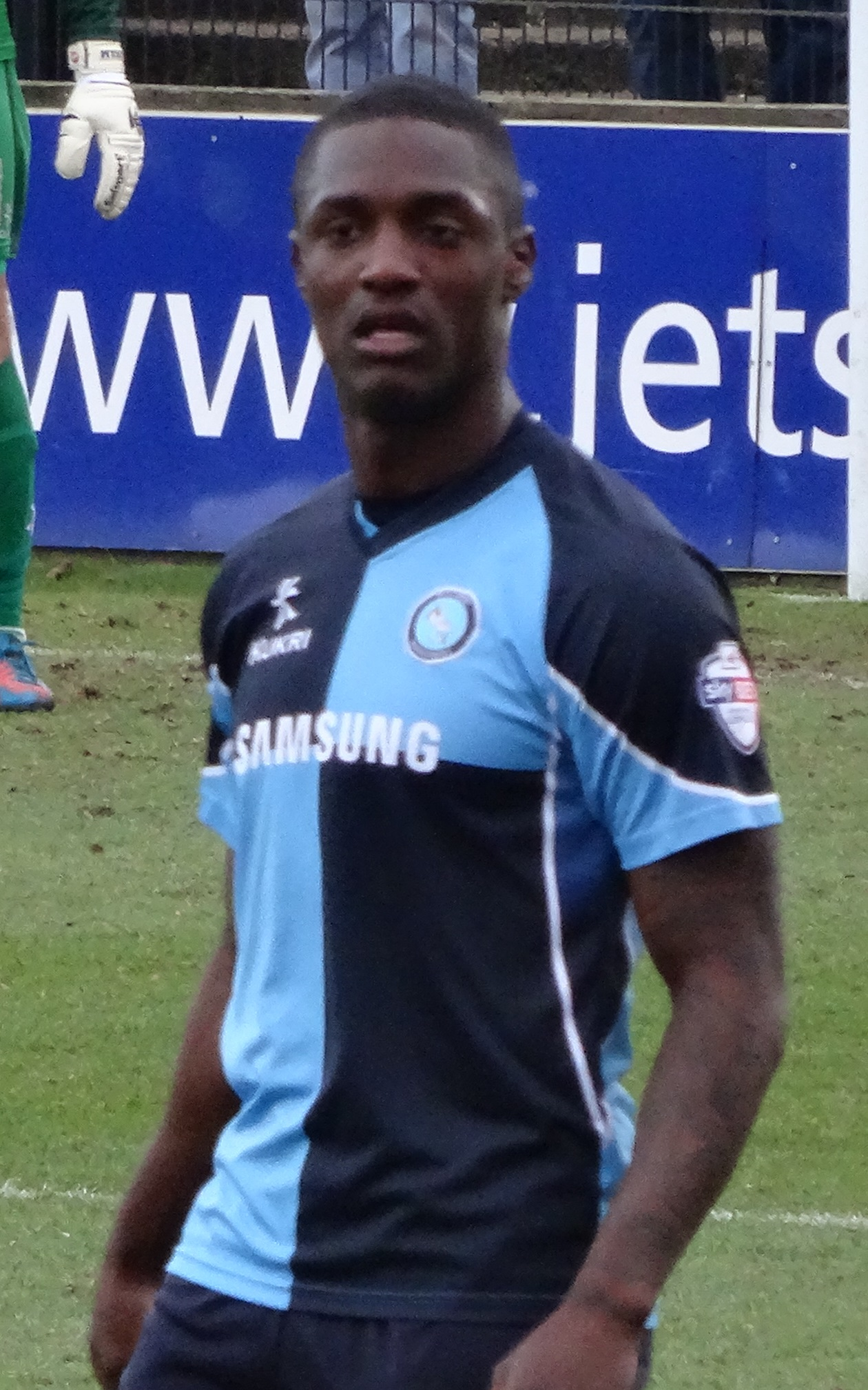
- Stewart playing for Wycombe Wanderers in 2014

Personal information
- Full name: Anthony Kelvin Stewart
- Date of birth: 18 September 1992 (age 34)
- Place of birth: Brixton, England
- Height: 5 ft 10 in (1.78 m)
- Position: Defender

Team information
- Current team: Bedford Town

Youth career
- Wycombe Wanderers

Senior career*
| Years | Team | Apps | (Gls) |
| 2011–2014 | Wycombe Wanderers | 56 | (4) |
| 2014–2015 | → Crewe Alexandra (loan) | 2 | (0) |
| 2015 | Crewe Alexandra | 8 | (0) |
| 2015–2022 | Wycombe Wanderers | 197 | (8) |
| 2022–2024 | Aberdeen | 21 | (1) |
| 2023 | → Milton Keynes Dons (loan) | 5 | (0) |
| 2023–2024 | → Milton Keynes Dons (loan) | 4 | (0) |
| 2024–2025 | Ebbsfleet United | 19 | (1) |
| 2025 | Kettering Town | 3 | (0) |
| 2025–2026 | Peterborough Sports | 19 | (0) |
| 2026– | Bedford Town | 7 | (0) |

International career^{‡}
| 2026– | Turks and Caicos Islands | 2 | (0) |
- * Club domestic league appearances and goals as of 05:41, 24 September 2026 (UTC) ‡ National team caps and goals as of 05:28, 29 September 2026 (UTC)

Anthony Kelvin Stewart (born 18 September 1992) is a Turks and Caicos Islander professional footballer who plays as a defender for National League North club Bedford Town. Mainly a centre-back, he can also play as a right-back.

== Club career ==
=== Wycombe Wanderers ===
Stewart came through Wycombe Wanderers's youth system and was awarded his first professional contract in 2011.

He made his Football League debut against Preston North End on 14 January 2012, playing the full match. Following this he featured among the substitutes before getting his next appearance with a start away to Stevenage. He then followed this with a home debut in the 1–1 draw with Carlisle. His emergence as a first team player coincided with reported interested from fellow League One sides Charlton, Colchester and Stevenage.

=== Crewe Alexandra ===
Stewart initially joined Crewe Alexandra on loan in November 2014. In January 2015, he signed a short-term contract to the end of the season at Crewe, with Wycombe receiving a small fee.

=== Return to Wycombe ===
On 26 June 2015, having been released by Crewe at the end of the 2014–15 season, Stewart rejoined Wycombe Wanderers on a two-year deal. On 13 July 2020, Stewart scored the first goal for Wycombe Wanderers as they won the EFL League One playoff final against Oxford United at Wembley Stadium.

=== Aberdeen ===
On 22 June 2022, Stewart signed a pre-contract with Scottish Premiership club Aberdeen on a two-year deal. On 8 July 2022, Aberdeen manager Jim Goodwin announced that Stewart would serve as the club's captain, taking over from Joe Lewis, with teammate Ross McCrorie serving as vice captain.

In January 2023 he joined League One club Milton Keynes Dons until the end of the season. He made his first appearance for the club against former team Wycombe Wanderers.

He was released by Aberdeen upon the expiry of his contract at the end of the 2023–24 season.

=== Ebbsfleet United ===
On 30 September 2024, Stewart signed for National League club Ebbsfleet United.

=== Kettering Town ===
On 30 September 2025, Stewart joined Southern League Premier Division Central club Kettering Town.

=== Peterborough Sports ===
On 1 November 2025, Stewart joined National League North club Peterborough Sports.

=== Bedford Town ===
On 8 August 2026, Stewart returned to the National League North following Peterborough Sports' relegation the previous season, joining Bedford Town on a one-year deal.

== International career ==
Stewart made his debut for the Turks and Caicos Islands national football team on 23 September 2026 against Montserrat.

== Personal life ==
Born in England, Stewart is of Jamaican descent.

== Career statistics ==
=== Club ===
As of 20 May 2024

Appearances and goals by club, season and competition
| Club | Season | League | | | National Cup | | League Cup | | Europe | | Other | | Total | |
| Club | Season | Division | Apps | Goals | Apps | Goals | Apps | Goals | Apps | Goals | Apps | Goals | Apps | Goals |
|---|---|---|---|---|---|---|---|---|---|---|---|---|---|---|
| Wycombe Wanderers | 2011–12 | League One | 4 | 0 | 0 | 0 | 0 | 0 | — | | 0 | 0 | 4 | 0 |
| Wycombe Wanderers | 2012–13 | League Two | 19 | 1 | 1 | 0 | 1 | 0 | — | | 1 (Note: Appearances in the Football League Trophy) | 0 | 22 | 1 |
| Wycombe Wanderers | 2013–14 | League Two | 33 | 3 | 3 | 0 | 1 | 0 | — | | 2 | 1 | 39 | 4 |
| Wycombe Wanderers | Total | | 56 | 4 | 4 | 0 | 2 | 0 | — | | 3 | 1 | 65 | 5 |
| Crewe Alexandra | 2014–15 | League One | 10 | 0 | 0 | 0 | 0 | 0 | — | | 0 | 0 | 10 | 0 |
| Wycombe Wanderers | 2015–16 | League Two | 27 | 1 | 3 | 0 | 1 | 0 | — | | 0 | 0 | 31 | 1 |
| Wycombe Wanderers | 2016–17 | League Two | 31 | 1 | 4 | 1 | 1 | 0 | — | | 5 | 1 | 41 | 3 |
| Wycombe Wanderers | 2017–18 | League Two | 17 | 1 | 2 | 0 | 0 | 0 | — | | 3 | 0 | 22 | 1 |
| Wycombe Wanderers | 2018–19 | League One | 17 | 0 | 0 | 0 | 1 | 1 | — | | 1 | 0 | 19 | 1 |
| Wycombe Wanderers | 2019–20 | League One | 34 | 2 | 2 | 1 | 1 | 0 | — | | 0 | 0 | 37 | 3 |
| Wycombe Wanderers | 2020–21 | Championship | 32 | 1 | 0 | 0 | 1 | 0 | — | | 0 | 0 | 33 | 1 |
| Wycombe Wanderers | 2021–22 | League One | 39 | 2 | 1 | 0 | 2 | 0 | — | | 0 | 0 | 42 | 2 |
| Wycombe Wanderers | Total | | 197 | 8 | 12 | 2 | 7 | 1 | — | | 9 | 1 | 225 | 12 |
| Aberdeen | 2022–23 | Scottish Premiership | 21 | 1 | 1 (Note: Appearance in the Scottish Cup) | 0 | 7 | 0 | — | | 0 | 0 | 29 | 1 |
| Aberdeen | 2023–24 | Scottish Premiership | 0 | 0 | — | | 0 | 0 | 0 | 0 | 0 | 0 | 0 | 0 |
| Aberdeen | Total | | 21 | 1 | 1 | 0 | 7 | 0 | — | | 0 | 0 | 29 | 1 |
| Milton Keynes Dons (loan) | 2022–23 | League One | 5 | 0 | — | | — | | — | | — | | 5 | 0 |
| Milton Keynes Dons (loan) | 2023–24 | League Two | 4 | 0 | 0 | 0 | — | | — | | 1 | 0 | 5 | 0 |
| Milton Keynes Dons (loan) | Total | | 9 | 0 | 0 | 0 | — | | — | | 1 | 0 | 10 | 0 |
| Peterborough Sports | 2025-26 | National League North | 19 | 0 | 0 | 0 | — | | — | | 0 | 0 | 19 | 0 |
| Peterborough Sports | Total | | 19 | 0 | 0 | 0 | — | | — | | 0 | 0 | 19 | 0 |
| Career total | | | 293 | 13 | 17 | 2 | 16 | 1 | 0 | 0 | 13 | 2 | 339 | 18 |

== Honours ==
Wycombe Wanderers

- EFL League One play-offs: 2020

Individual

- Wycombe Wanderers Players' Player of the Season: 2019–20
