= Nnamdi Ofoborh =

English-Nigerian footballer (born 1999)

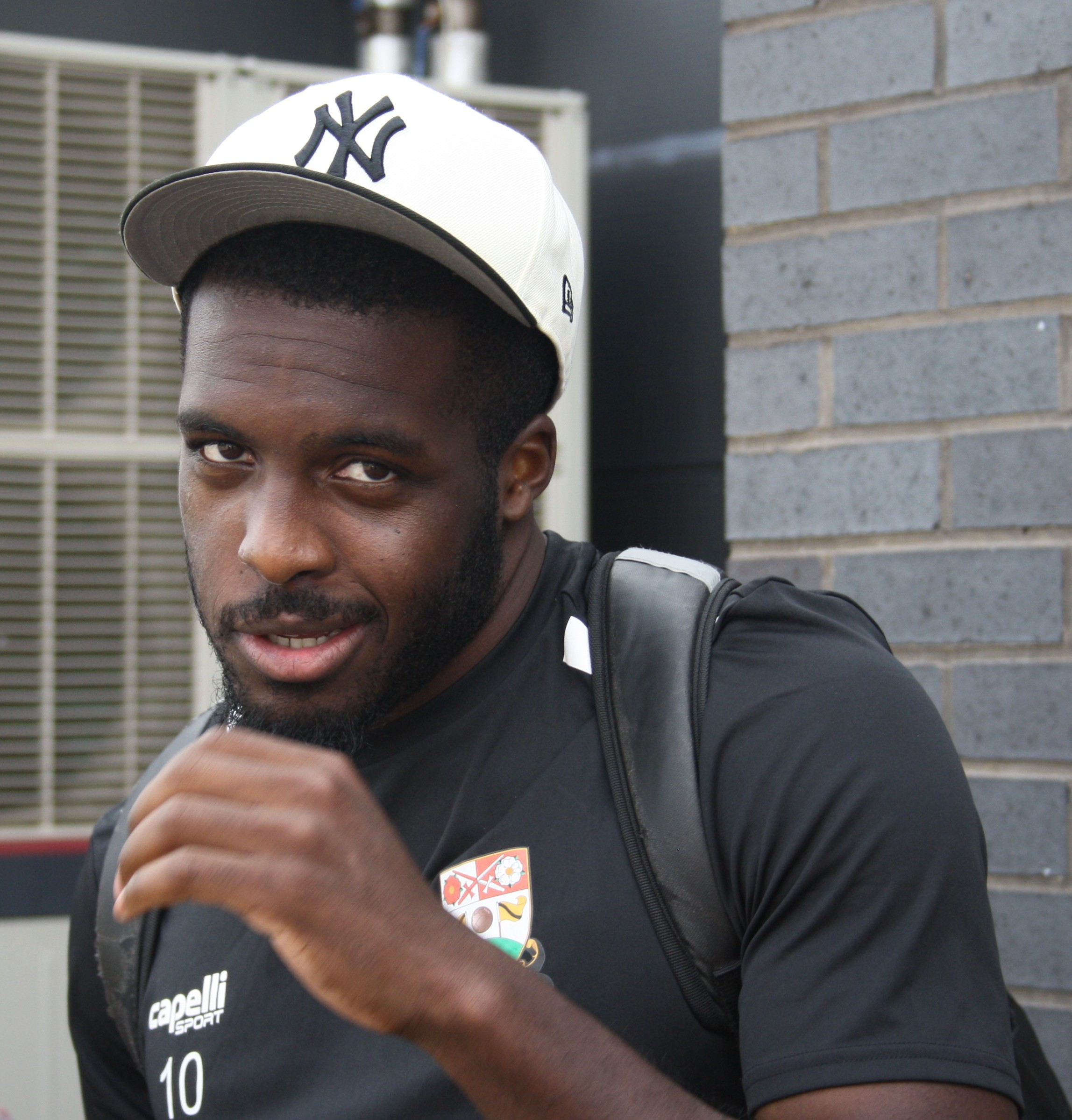
- Ofoborh in 2026

Personal information
- Full name: Nathan Nnamdi Ugochukwu Benjamin Asigboro Ofoborh
- Date of birth: 7 November 1999 (age 27)
- Place of birth: Southwark, England
- Height: 5 ft 9 in (1.75 m)
- Position: Central midfielder

Team information
- Current team: Barnet
- Number: 10

Youth career
- Millwall
- 2016–2017: AFC Bournemouth

Senior career*
Years	Team	Apps	(Gls)
2017–2021	AFC Bournemouth	3	(0)
2019–2020	→ Wycombe Wanderers (loan)	18	(0)
2021	→ Wycombe Wanderers (loan)	8	(0)
2021–2023	Rangers	0	(0)
2024–2025	Swindon Town	41	(2)
2025–	Barnet	55	(5)

International career
2019	Nigeria U20	3	(2)
- * Club domestic league appearances and goals as of 12:52, 8 November 2026 (UTC)

Nathan Nnamdi Ugochukwu Benjamin Asigboro Ofoborh (born 7 November 1999) is a professional footballer who plays as a central or defensive midfielder for EFL League Two club Barnet. Born in England, Ofoborh has represented Nigeria internationally.

== Club career ==
=== AFC Bournemouth ===
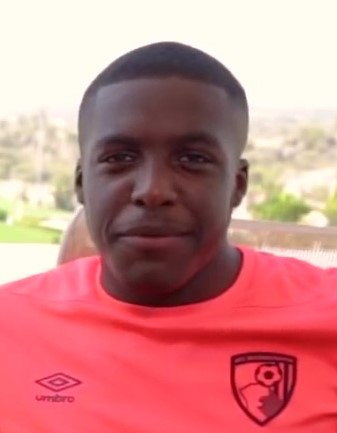
Ofoborh interviewed while at AFC Bournemouth in 2018

.

Ofoborh started his youth career at Millwall before deciding to take up an apprenticeship with the Cherries in July 2016, having impressed during a trial spell, and enjoyed a fruitful two-year term with the club's under-18s, including captaining them in his second year and being named Young Player of the Season in 2017–18. Having signed his first professional deal in July 2017, Ofoborh was rewarded with a new contract in December 2018, tying him to the club until 2021.

After re-signing with the club in December 2018, Ofoborh appeared on the bench for two Premier League games in the 2018–19 season, including the 1–0 home loss to Fulham on 20 April, and a 1–0 home win against Tottenham Hotspur on 4 May. Having trained regularly with Eddie Howe's first-team squad, Ofoborh started pre-season friendlies against AFC Wimbledon, Girona and West Bromwich Albion in 2019, including an impressive 3–0 win against Lyon.

On 2 September 2019, Ofoborh joined Wycombe Wanderers on a season-long loan. He made his professional debut in Wycombe's league game against Lincoln City on 8 September 2019. He scored his first professional goal for Wycombe in an EFL Trophy tie against Milton Keynes Dons on 12 November 2019. Ofoborh then went on to score his first league goal for Wycombe Wanderers in a EFL League One play-off semi final against Fleetwood Town on 3 July 2020. Ofoborh started in the League One Play-Off Final for Wycombe on 13 July, playing 62 minutes as Wycombe overcame Oxford United 2–1 to win promotion to the second tier of English football for the first time in their history.

Following Bournemouth's relegation from the Premier League to the Championship, Ofoborh returned to the squad for the 2020–21 season. He played in a pre-season friendly game against Benfica on 29 August; a 2–1 loss. He made his competitive debut for Bournemouth in an EFL Cup tie against Crystal Palace on 15 September 2020. The game went to penalties and Ofoborh scored his effort as Bournemouth won the shootout. Ofoborh made his league debut for the club in a 3–1 away win against Coventry City, coming on as a sub in the 90th minute. On 1 February 2021, Ofoborh returned to Wycombe Wanderers on loan until the end of the 2020–21 season.

=== Rangers ===
Ofoborh signed a four-year pre-contract agreement with Scottish club Rangers in February 2021. A heart issue was discovered shortly after he joined the club, this sidelined Ofoborh for further tests. He failed to appear in a matchday squad during his time with Rangers. On 24 August 2023, it was announced that Ofoborh had agreed to mutually terminated his contract with Rangers, which had two years remaining, and he left the club without making an appearance.

=== Swindon Town ===
On 29 March 2024, Ofoborh signed for EFL League Two side Swindon Town on a contract until the end of the 2023–24 season. On 6 June 2024, he signed a new extended contract with the club. He was initially offered a new contract by Swindon at the end of the 2024–25 season, the offer was revoked by manager Ian Holloway over commitment concerns.

=== Barnet ===
Ofoborh signed for Barnet in July 2025.

== International career ==
Ofoborh was called up to the Nigeria U20s squad for the Under-20 World Cup finals in Poland in May–June 2019, making three appearances in the tournament. He made his debut as a substitute in a 4–0 win over Qatar in their opening group game before starting in a 1–1 draw with Ukraine as the Flying Eagles advanced to the knockout stage. Ofoborh also started the round of 16 defeat by Senegal in Łódź.

== Career statistics ==
As of 7 November 2026

Appearances and goals by club, season and competition
Club	Season	League			National Cup		League Cup		Other		Total	
Club	Season	Division	Apps	Goals	Apps	Goals	Apps	Goals	Apps	Goals	Apps	Goals
AFC Bournemouth	2018–19	Premier League	0	0	0	0	0	0	0	0	0	0
AFC Bournemouth	2020–21	Championship	3	0	0	0	2	0	0	0	5	0
AFC Bournemouth	Total		3	0	0	0	2	0	0	0	5	0
Wycombe Wanderers (loan)	2019–20	League One	18	0	1	0	0	0	6 (Note: Includes three appearances in the EFL Trophy and three appearances in the English Football League play-offs)	2 (Note: Includes one goal in the EFL Trophy and one goal in the English Football League play-offs)	25	2
Wycombe Wanderers (loan)	2020–21	Championship	8	0	0	0	0	0	0	0	8	0
Wycombe Wanderers (loan)	Total		26	0	1	0	0	0	6	2	33	2
Rangers	2021–22	Scottish Premiership	0	0	0	0	0	0	0	0	0	0
Rangers	2022–23	Scottish Premiership	0	0	0	0	0	0	0	0	0	0
Rangers	Total		0	0	0	0	0	0	0	0	0	0
Swindon Town	2023–24	League Two	7	0	0	0	0	0	0	0	7	0
Swindon Town	2024–25	League Two	34	2	1	0	1	1	3 (Note: Appearances in EFL Trophy)	0	39	3
Swindon Town	Total		41	2	1	0	1	1	3	0	46	3
Barnet	2025–26	League Two	43	5	1	0	0	0	2	0	46	5
Barnet	2026–27	League Two	12	0	1	1	1	0	1	0	15	1
Barnet	Total		55	5	2	1	1	0	3	0	61	6
Career total			125	7	4	1	4	1	12	2	145	11

== Honours ==
Wycombe Wanderers

- EFL League One play-offs: 2020

Individual

- AFC Bournemouth U-21 Player of the Year: 2018
- Wycombe Wanderers Goal of the Season: 2019–20
