= Mark Sykes (footballer) =

Irish footballer (born 1997)

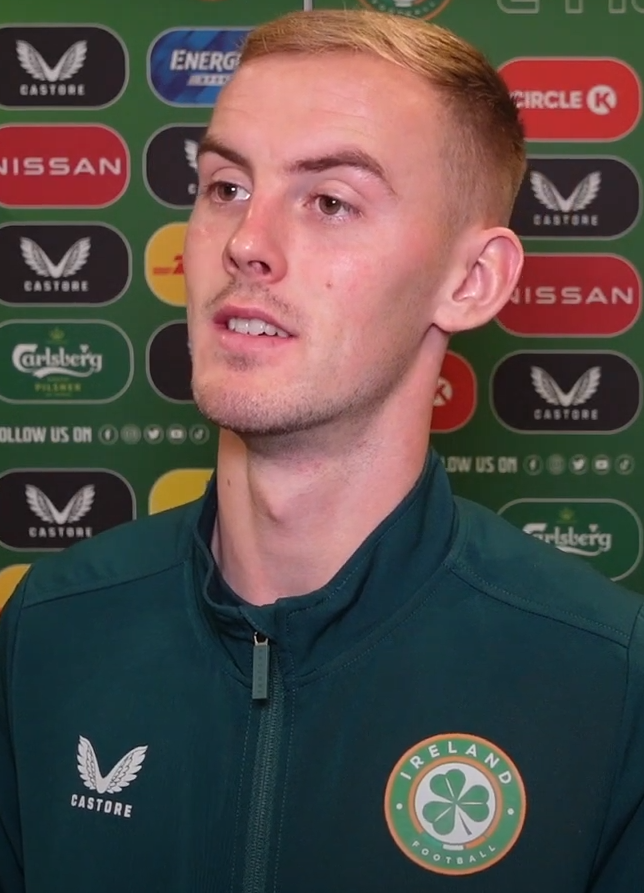
- Sykes with the Republic of Ireland in 2023

Personal information
- Full name: Mark Sykes
- Date of birth: 4 August 1997 (age 29)
- Place of birth: Belfast, Northern Ireland
- Height: 6 ft 0 in (1.82 m)
- Position: Midfielder

Team information
- Current team: Millwall
- Number: 17

Youth career
- –2019: Glenavon

Senior career*
Years	Team	Apps	(Gls)
2013–2019	Glenavon	117	(16)
2019–2022	Oxford United	104	(9)
2022–2026	Bristol City	141	(17)
2026–	Millwall	14	(1)

International career^{‡}
- Northern Ireland U18
- Northern Ireland U19
2016–2018	Northern Ireland U21	11	(2)
2022–	Republic of Ireland	7	(0)
- * Club domestic league appearances and goals as of 09:08, 22 November 2026 (UTC) ‡ National team caps and goals as of 22:00, 20 March 2025 (UTC)

Mark Sykes (born 4 August 1997) is an Irish professional footballer who plays as a midfielder for EFL Championship club Millwall.

Born in Northern Ireland, he plays for the Republic of Ireland national team, having previously represented Northern Ireland at underage level.

== Club career ==
=== Glenavon ===
Born in Belfast, Sykes began his career with Glenavon. In December 2017 he was linked with a transfer away from the club. In February 2018 he signed a new contract until the end of the 2018–19 season. In March 2018 he was described by a journalist as "one of the most outstanding young prospects in the Irish League".

=== Oxford United ===
In January 2019 he signed for English club Oxford United, making his debut on 8 January 2019 in the EFL Trophy. He scored his first goal for Oxford against Millwall in the EFL Cup on 27 August 2019, and his first league goal in a 2–1 victory over AFC Wimbledon on 29 December 2019. In his three and a half seasons at the club he made 137 appearances and scored 12 times, including Oxford's consolation goal in their 2–1 defeat to Wycombe Wanderers in the 2020 EFL League One play-off final at Wembley Stadium.

=== Bristol City ===
In May 2022, Bristol City announced that they had signed Sykes, with the transfer becoming official on 1 July 2022, on a three-year deal with the option of a further year. On 3 October 2023, Sykes was voted Bristol City's September Player of the Month, receiving 46% of the total votes. On 2 February 2025, Sykes signed a 12 month contract extension. On 12 June 2026, it was announced that Sykes would be released at the end of his contract.

=== Millwall ===
On 9 July 2026, Sykes joined Millwall on a two-year deal.

== International career ==
=== Northern Ireland ===
Sykes has also played for Northern Ireland at under-18, under-19 and under-21 youth levels. He made his debut for the under-21 side in September 2016, in a 2–0 defeat to Macedonia and as of 28 January 2019 had 11 caps and 2 goals.

He received his first call-up to the Northern Ireland senior team in May 2019. He was called up again in September 2019.

=== Republic of Ireland ===
In August 2020, Sykes informed the Irish Football Association (which governs football in Northern Ireland) that he no longer wished to be considered for their squad, instead opting for the Republic of Ireland. In March 2022, he was named in Stephen Kenny's Republic of Ireland squad for forthcoming friendly matches.

Sykes was named as a late inclusion to the squad in November 2022 for the Republic of Ireland's November friendlies with Norway and Malta, following the withdrawals of two players through injury.

On 20 November 2022, Sykes made his debut in a 1–0 win over Malta, becoming the first Belfast–born player to represent the Republic of Ireland since 1946.

== Career statistics ==
=== Club ===
As of match played 21 November 2026

Appearances and goals by club, season and competition
Club	Season	League			National cup (Note: Includes Irish Cup and FA Cup)		League cup (Note: Includes Irish League Cup and EFL Cup)		Other		Total	
Club	Season	Division	Apps	Goals	Apps	Goals	Apps	Goals	Apps	Goals	Apps	Goals
Glenavon	2013–14	NIFL Premiership	5	0	0	0	0	0	0	0	5	0
Glenavon	2014–15	NIFL Premiership	2	0	0	0	0	0	1 (Note: Appearance(s) in UEFA Europa League.)	0	3	0
Glenavon	2015–16	NIFL Premiership	25	1	4	0	0	0	0	0	29	1
Glenavon	2016–17	NIFL Premiership	33	2	3	1	2	0	2	0	40	3
Glenavon	2017–18	NIFL Premiership	30	9	2	0	0	0	0	0	32	9
Glenavon	2018–19	NIFL Premiership	22	4	0	0	0	0	2	0	24	4
Glenavon	Total		117	16	9	1	2	0	5	0	133	17
Oxford United	2018–19	League One	9	0	0	0	0	0	2 (Note: Appearance(s) in the EFL Trophy.)	0	11	0
Oxford United	2019–20	League One	23	1	4	0	4	1	7 (Note: 4 appearances in the EFL Trophy; 3 appearances and 1 goal in the play-offs.)	1	39	3
Oxford United	2020–21	League One	32	0	1	0	1	0	8 (Note: 6 appearances in the EFL Trophy, 2 appearances in the play-offs.)	0	42	0
Oxford United	2021–22	League One	40	8	2	0	1	0	1	0	44	8
Oxford United	Total		104	9	7	0	6	1	18	1	135	11
Bristol City	2022–23	Championship	36	5	4	1	2	0	—		42	6
Bristol City	2023–24	Championship	40	5	0	0	2	0	—		42	5
Bristol City	2024–25	Championship	27	3	0	0	1	0	0	0	28	3
Bristol City	2025–26	Championship	38	4	1	0	2	0	—		41	4
Bristol City	Total		141	17	5	1	7	0	0	0	153	18
Millwall	2026–27	Championship	14	1	0	0	2	0	—		16	1
Career total			376	43	20	2	17	1	23	1	436	47

=== International ===
As of match played 23 March 2025

Appearances and goals by national team and year
National team	Year	Apps	Goals
Republic of Ireland	2022	1	0
Republic of Ireland	2023	2	0
Republic of Ireland	2024	2	0
Republic of Ireland	2025	2	0
Total		7	0

== Honours ==
Glenavon

- Irish Cup: 2015–16

Individual

- Ulster Young Footballer of the Year 2017–18
