= 2020 EFL play-offs =

- Wembley Stadium was the venue for each play-off final
- Season: 2019–20

The English Football League play-offs for the 2019–20 season (referred to as the Sky Bet Play-Offs for sponsorship reasons) were held in June, July and August 2020 with all finals played at Wembley Stadium in London. The play-offs began in each league with two semi-finals played over two legs. The teams who finished in 3rd, 4th, 5th, and 6th place in the Championship and League One and the 4th, 5th, 6th, and 7th-placed teams in League Two were set to compete. The winners of the semi-finals advanced to the finals, with the winner of the final gaining promotion for the following season.

The away goals rule does not apply in the playoff semi-finals per the standard rules.

== Background ==
The English Football League play-offs have been held every year since 1987. They take place for each division following the conclusion of the regular season and are contested by the four clubs finishing below the automatic promotion places. The fixtures are determined by final league position – in the Championship and League One this is 3rd v 6th and 4th v 5th, while in League Two it is 4th v 7th and 5th v 6th.

== Championship ==
The matchups were determined on 22 July 2020 on the conclusion of the league season.

=== Championship semi-finals ===
Final league position – Championship
Pos	Team	Pld	W	D	L	GF	GA	GD	Pts
3	Brentford	46	24	9	13	80	38	+42	81
4	Fulham	46	23	12	11	64	48	+16	81
5	Cardiff City	46	19	16	11	68	58	+10	73
6	Swansea City	46	18	16	12	62	53	+9	70

First leg

26 July 2020
18:30 BST

Swansea City	1–0	Brentford
Ayew 81'	Report

Liberty Stadium, Swansea
Attendance: 0 (Note: The semi-finals and final would be played behind closed doors due to the COVID-19 pandemic in the United Kingdom.)
Referee: Keith Stroud
27 July 2020
19:45 BST

Cardiff City	0–2	Fulham
	Report	Onomah 49'; Kebano 90+1'

Cardiff City Stadium, Cardiff
Attendance: 0
Referee: Geoff Eltringham

Second leg

29 July 2020
19:45 BST

Brentford	3–1	Swansea City
Watkins 11'; Marcondes 15'; Mbeumo 46'	Report	Brewster 78'

Griffin Park, Brentford, London
Attendance: 0
Referee: Chris Kavanagh

Brentford won 3–2 on aggregate

30 July 2020
19:45 BST

Fulham	1–2	Cardiff City
Kebano 9'	Report	Nelson 8'; Tomlin 47'

Craven Cottage, Fulham, London
Attendance: 0
Referee: Paul Tierney

Fulham won 3–2 on aggregate

=== Championship final ===
4 August 2020
19:45 BST

Brentford	1–2 (a.e.t.)	Fulham
Dalsgaard 120+4'	Report	Bryan 105', 117'

Wembley Stadium, London
Attendance: 0 (Note: The final was played behind closed doors due to the COVID-19 pandemic in the United Kingdom.)
Referee: Martin Atkinson

== League One ==
After suspending play due to the COVID-19 pandemic in the United Kingdom, EFL League One clubs voted to curtail the season, and they used points per game (PPG) to decide the final standings.

Final league position – League One										
Pos	Team	Pld	W	D	L	GF	GA	GD	Pts	PPG
3	Wycombe Wanderers	34	17	8	9	45	40	+5	59	1.74
4	Oxford United	35	17	9	9	61	37	+24	60	1.71
5	Portsmouth	35	17	9	9	53	36	+17	60	1.71
6	Fleetwood Town	35	16	12	7	51	38	+13	60	1.71

=== League One semi-finals ===
First leg

3 July 2020
17:30 BST

Portsmouth	1–1	Oxford United
Curtis 32'	Report	Browne 43'

Fratton Park, Portsmouth
Attendance: 0
Referee: Gavin Ward
3 July 2020
19:30 BST

Fleetwood Town	1–4	Wycombe Wanderers
Evans 4' (pen.)	Report	Ofoborh 2'; Jacobson 6'; Wheeler 45+3'; Samuel 57'

Highbury Stadium, Fleetwood
Attendance: 0
Referee: Tony Harrington

Second leg

6 July 2020
17:00 BST

Oxford United	1–1 (a.e.t.)	Portsmouth
Harrison 45+3' (o.g.)	Report	Harness 38'
Penalties
Woodburn (penalty scored); Forde (penalty scored); Taylor (penalty scored); Mousinho (penalty scored); Brannagan (penalty scored)	5–4	(penalty scored) Marquis; (penalty scored) Evans; (penalty scored) Brown; (penalty missed) McGeehan; (penalty scored) Hawkins

Kassam Stadium, Oxford
Attendance: 0
Referee: Darren England

2–2 on aggregate, Oxford United won 5–4 on penalties.

6 July 2020
19:30 BST

Wycombe Wanderers	2–2	Fleetwood Town
Onyedinma 47', 90+4'	Report	Andrew 23'; Evans 60' (pen.)

Adams Park, High Wycombe
Attendance: 0
Referee: Darren Bond

Wycombe Wanderers won 6–3 on aggregate.

=== League One final ===
13 July 2020
19:30 BST

Wycombe Wanderers	2–1	Oxford United
Stewart 9'; Jacobson 79' (pen.)	Report	Sykes 57'

Wembley Stadium, London
Attendance: 0 (Note: The final was played behind closed doors due to the COVID-19 pandemic in the United Kingdom.)
Referee: Robert Jones

== League Two ==
After suspending play due to the COVID-19 pandemic in the United Kingdom, EFL League Two clubs voted to curtail the season, and they used points per game (PPG) to decide the final standings.

Final league position – League Two										
Pos	Team	Pld	W	D	L	GF	GA	GD	Pts	PPG
4	Cheltenham Town	36	17	13	6	52	27	+25	64	1.78
5	Exeter City	37	18	11	8	53	43	+10	65	1.76
6	Colchester United	37	15	13	9	52	37	+15	58	1.57
7	Northampton Town	37	17	7	13	54	40	+14	58	1.57

=== League Two semi-finals ===
First leg

18 June 2020
17:15 BST

Colchester United	1–0	Exeter City
Bramall 81'	Report

Colchester Community Stadium, Colchester
Attendance: 0
Referee: Josh Smith

18 June 2020
19:45 BST

Northampton Town	0–2	Cheltenham Town
	Report	Raglan 26'; Thomas 86'

Sixfields Stadium, Northampton
Attendance: 0
Referee: Marc Edwards

Second leg

22 June 2020
17:15 BST

Exeter City	3–1 (a.e.t.)	Colchester United
Martin 10'; Richardson 58'; Bowman 111'	Report	Senior 78'

St James Park, Exeter
Attendance: 0
Referee: Charles Breakspear

Exeter City won 3–2 on aggregate.

22 June 2020
20:00 BST

Cheltenham Town	0–3	Northampton Town
	Report	Oliver 9'; Morton 57', 77'

Whaddon Road, Cheltenham
Attendance: 0
Referee: Leigh Doughty

Northampton Town won 3–2 on aggregate.

=== League Two final ===
29 June 2020
19:30 BST

Exeter City	0–4	Northampton Town
	Report	Watson 11'; Morton 31'; Hoskins 80'; Williams 89'

Wembley Stadium, London
Attendance: 0
Referee: Michael Salisbury
