= 2020–21 Wycombe Wanderers F.C. season =

Wycombe Wanderers
2020–21 season
- Owner: Feliciana EFL Ltd (75%); Wycombe Wanderers Trust (25%)
- Chairman: Rob Couhig
- Manager: Gareth Ainsworth
- Stadium: Adams Park
- EFL Championship: 22nd (relegated)
- FA Cup: Fourth round
- EFL Cup: First round
- Top goalscorer: League: Uche Ikpeazu (6); All: Uche Ikpeazu (6)
- Highest home attendance: 2,000 vs. Coventry City; 12 December 2020
- Lowest home attendance: 1,000 vs. Stoke City; 2 December 2020
- Average home league attendance: 1,500 (Excludes any home fixtures played behind closed doors)
- Biggest win: 4–1 (vs. Preston North End, 9 January 2021)
- Biggest defeat: 7–2 (vs. Brentford, 30 January 2021)
| Home colours | Away colours | Third colours |

The 2020–21 Wycombe Wanderers Football Club season was the club's 134th season in existence and the club's first season in the second division of English football. In addition to the domestic league, Wycombe participated in this season's editions of the FA Cup and the EFL Cup.

== Players ==
=== Current squad ===
| No. | Nationality | Name | Age | Joined club (Note: Year that player became a Wycombe Wanderers first-team player. If a player has played more than one spell at Wycombe Wanderers, the beginning of the most recent spell is used.) | Contract expires (Note: The loan expiration date is stated in this column as either a specific date or "End of season".) (Note: If the contract expiration is unknown "N/A" is stated.) | All time appearances for club | All time goals for club |
|---|---|---|---|---|---|---|---|
GOALKEEPERS
| 1 | (England) | Ryan Allsop | 34 | July 2018 | June 2021 | 129 | 0 |
| 13 | (Scotland) | Cameron Yates | 27 | September 2018 | June 2021 | 3 | 0 |
| 31 | (England) | David Stockdale | 40 | September 2020 | June 2022 | 21 | 0 |
| 32 | (England) | Curtis Anderson | 25 | September 2020 | June 2021 | 0 | 0 |
DEFENDERS
| 2 | (Scotland) | Jack Grimmer | 32 | July 2019 | June 2023 | 66 | 0 |
| 3 | (Wales) | Joe Jacobson | 39 | July 2014 | June 2022 | 302 | 38 |
| 5 | (England) | Anthony Stewart | 33 | July 2015 | June 2022 | 250 | 16 |
| 6 | (England) | Ryan Tafazolli | 34 | September 2020 | N/A | 21 | 2 |
| 12 | (England) | Josh Knight† | 29 | October 2021 | End of season | 39 | 2 32 Age 16 September 2020 End of season Taynile Gray |
| 16 | (United States) | Giles Phillips | 29 | August 2020 | June 2021 | 16 | 0 |
| 21 | (England) | Darius Charles | 38 | August 2019 | June 2021 | 43 | 2 |
| 26 | (England) | Jason McCarthy | 30 | August 2020 | June 2023 | 123 | 8 |
| 27 | (England) | Jordan Obita | 32 | January 2021 | June 2023 | 9 | 0 |
| 34 | (Saint Kitts and Nevis) | Andre Burley | 27 | September 2020 | June 2021 | 0 | 0 |
| 37 | (England) | James Clark | 25 | November 2020 | June 2021 | 0 | 0 |
| 38 | (England) | Chris Forino-Joseph | 26 | April 2021 | June 2022 | 0 | 0 |
MIDFIELDERS
| 4 | (England) | Dominic Gape | 32 | January 2017 | June 2022 | 172 | 3 |
| 7 | (England) | David Wheeler | 35 | July 2019 | N/A | 80 | 7 |
| 8 | (England) | Alex Pattison | 29 | July 2019 | June 2021 | 30 | 0 |
| 10 | (England) | Matt Bloomfield | 42 | December 2003 | June 2022 | 557 | 42 |
| 18 | (England) | Curtis Thompson | 33 | July 2018 | N/A | 113 | 1 |
| 23 | (Nigeria) | Fred Onyedinma | 29 | July 2019 | June 2022 | 114 | 23 |
| 24 | (England) | Dennis Adeniran† | 27 | September 2020 | End of season | 22 | 0 |
| 28 | (Nigeria) | Nnamdi Ofoborh† | 26 | January 2021 | End of season | 33 | 2 |
| 33 | (Albania) | Anis Mehmeti | 25 | September 2020 | June 2021 | 29 | 3 |
FORWARDS
| 9 | (Uganda) | Uche Ikpeazu | 31 | August 2020 | June 2023 | 33 | 6 |
| 11 | (England) | Scott Kashket | 30 | August 2016 | June 2022 | 129 | 31 |
| 17 | (Republic of Ireland) | Daryl Horgan | 34 | September 2020 | June 2022 | 42 | 1 |
| 19 | (Jamaica) | Garath McCleary | 39 | November 2020 | N/A | 33 | 4 |
| 15 | (Zimbabwe) | Admiral Muskwe† | 28 | January 2021 | End of season | 19 | 3 |
| 20 | (England) | Adebayo Akinfenwa | 44 | July 2016 | June 2021 | 211 | 54 |
| 25 | (Wales) | Alex Samuel | 30 | August 2018 | June 2022 | 86 | 11 |
| 35 | (Cyprus) | Andronicos Georgiou | 26 | September 2020 | June 2021 | 0 | 0 |
| 36 | (England) | Malachi Linton | 25 | September 2020 | June 2021 | 0 | 0 |

† Loan player

== Transfers ==
=== Transfers in ===
| Date | Position | Nationality | Name | From | Fee | Ref. |
|---|---|---|---|---|---|---|
| 17 August 2020 | CF | (Uganda) | Uche Ikpeazu | (Scotland) Heart of Midlothian | Undisclosed | |
| 20 August 2020 | CB | (United States) | Giles Phillips | (England) Queens Park Rangers U23s | Free transfer | |
| 25 August 2020 | RB | (England) | Jason McCarthy | (England) Millwall | Undisclosed | |
| 2 September 2020 | GK | (England) | Curtis Anderson | Free agent | Free transfer | |
| 2 September 2020 | RW | (Republic of Ireland) | Daryl Horgan | (Scotland) Hibernian | Undisclosed | |
| 2 September 2020 | CB | (England) | Ryan Tafazolli | (England) Hull City | Undisclosed | |
| 9 September 2020 | GK | (England) | David Stockdale | (England) Birmingham City | Free transfer | |
| 29 September 2020 | CB | (Saint Kitts and Nevis) | Andre Burley | (England) Reading U23s | Free transfer | |
| 29 September 2020 | CF | (Cyprus) | Andronicos Georgiou | (England) Stevenage | Free transfer | |
| 29 September 2020 | CF | (England) | Malachi Linton | (England) Lowestoft Town | Free transfer | |
| 29 September 2020 | AM | (Albania) | Anis Mehmeti | (England) Woodford Town | Free transfer | |
| 4 November 2020 | RW | (Jamaica) | Garath McCleary | Free agent | Free transfer | |
| 27 November 2020 | RB | (England) | James Clark | Free agent | Free transfer | |
| 29 January 2021 | LB | (England) | Jordan Obita | (England) Oxford United | Undisclosed | |
| 27 April 2021 | CB | (England) | Chris Forino-Joseph | Free agent | Free transfer | |

=== Loans in ===
| Date from | Position | Nationality | Name | From | Date until | Ref. |
|---|---|---|---|---|---|---|
| 25 September 2020 | CM | (England) | Dennis Adeniran | (England) Everton U23s | End of season | |
| 5 October 2020 | RB | (England) | Josh Knight | (England) Leicester City U23s | End of season | |
| 5 January 2021 | CF | (Zimbabwe) | Admiral Muskwe | (England) Leicester City U23s | End of season | |
| 1 February 2021 | CM | (Nigeria) | Nnamdi Ofoborh | (England) AFC Bournemouth | End of season | |

=== Transfers out ===
| Date | Position | Nationality | Name | To | Fee | Ref. |
|---|---|---|---|---|---|---|
| 16 July 2020 | DM | (England) | Jacob Gardiner-Smith | Free agent | Released | |
| 16 July 2020 | CB | (Portugal) | Sido Jombati | (England) Oldham Athletic | Released | |
| 16 July 2020 | CF | (Scotland) | Craig Mackail-Smith | (England) Bedford Town | Released | |
| 16 July 2020 | LB | (England) | Jamie Mascoll | (England) Bolton Wanderers | Released | |
| 15 January 2021 | CF | (Antigua and Barbuda) | Josh Parker | (England) Burton Albion | Free transfer | |

=== Loans out ===
| Date from | Position | Nationality | Name | To | Date until | Ref. |
|---|---|---|---|---|---|---|
| 31 October 2020 | GK | (England) | Curtis Anderson | (England) Walton Casuals | | |
| 31 October 2020 | CF | (England) | Malachi Linton | (England) Slough Town | | |
| 14 November 2020 | CB | (United States) | Giles Phillips | (England) Aldershot Town | January 2021 | |
| 14 December 2020 | CB | (Saint Kitts and Nevis) | Andre Burley | (England) Hungerford Town | January 2021 | |
| 18 January 2021 | CM | (England) | Nick Freeman | (England) Leyton Orient | End of season | |
| 2 February 2021 | GK | (England) | David Stockdale | (England) Stevenage | 9 February 2021 | |
| 23 February 2021 | CB | (United States) | Giles Phillips | (England) Aldershot Town | March 2021 | |

== Pre-season and friendlies ==
Wycombe Wanderers' first pre-season friendly was announced on 14 August 2020, playing West Ham United on 25 August 2020. A second pre-season friendly was announced on 21 August 2020 against Southampton Under-23s, played that day. A third friendly against Aston Villa for 29 August 2020 was confirmed via the club's Twitter account on 25 August 2020. On the same day, Chesham United's Chairman released a statement, confirming that they will replace their friendly with Banbury United with a game against a Wycombe XI on 11 September, the day before Wycombe would be starting their Championship season against Rotherham United.

Win Draw Loss Fixtures

| 21 August 2020 Friendly | Southampton U23s | 0–1 | Wycombe Wanderers | Southampton |
| 15:00 BST | | Report | Samuel 58' | Stadium: St Mary's Stadium; Attendance: Behind closed doors |

| 25 August 2020 Friendly | Wycombe Wanderers | 1–5 | West Ham United | High Wycombe |
| 14:00 BST | Samuel 31' | Report | Masuaku 8'; Charles 29' (o.g.); Lanzini 35'; Bowen 42', 59' | Stadium: Adams Park; Attendance: Behind closed doors |

| 29 August 2020 Friendly | Aston Villa | 5–2 | Wycombe Wanderers | Bodymoor Heath |
| | Samatta; El Ghazi; Konsa; Trézéguet | Report | Onyedinma; Kashket; Jacobson (penalty missed) | Stadium: Bodymoor Heath Training Ground; Attendance: Behind closed doors |

| 11 September 2020 Friendly | Chesham United | 2–1 | Wycombe Wanderers | Chesham |
| 19:45 BST | | | | Stadium: The Meadow |

| 10 November 2020 Friendly | Wycombe Wanderers | 4–1 | AFC Bournemouth U21s | High Wycombe |
| 13:00 GMT | Samuel; McCarthy | Report | Anthony | Stadium: Adams Park; Attendance: Behind closed doors |

| 26 January 2021 Friendly | Wycombe Wanderers | 1–0 | Brentford B | High Wycombe |
| 13:00 GMT | Pattison (pen.) | Report | | Stadium: Adams Park; Attendance: Behind closed doors |

| 25 March 2021 Friendly | Wycombe Wanderers | 2–0 | Ebbsfleet United | High Wycombe |
| | Samuel; Kashket | Report | | Stadium: Adams Park; Attendance: Behind closed doors |

== Competitions ==
=== Overview ===
| Competition | First match | Last match | Starting round | Final position | Record | | | | | | | |
| Competition | First match | Last match | Starting round | Final position | Pld | W | D | L | GF | GA | GD | Win % |
|---|---|---|---|---|---|---|---|---|---|---|---|---|
| EFL Championship | 12 September 2020 | 8 May 2021 | Matchday 1 | | 46 | 11 | 10 | 25 | 39 | 69 | −30 | 23.91 |
| FA Cup | 9 January 2021 | 25 January 2021 | Third round | Fourth round | 2 | 1 | 0 | 1 | 5 | 5 | +0 | 50.00 |
| EFL Cup | 6 September 2020 | 6 September 2020 | First round | First round | 1 | 0 | 1 | 0 | 1 | 1 | +0 | 0.00 |
| Total | | | | | 49 | 12 | 11 | 26 | 45 | 75 | −30 | 24.49 |

Last updated: 8 May 2021
Source: Competitions

=== EFL Championship ===
==== League table ====
| Pos | Team | Pld | W | D | L | GF | GA | GD | Pts | Promotion, qualification or relegation |
|---|---|---|---|---|---|---|---|---|---|---|
| 19 | Bristol City | 46 | 15 | 6 | 25 | 46 | 68 | −22 | 51 | |
| 20 | Huddersfield Town | 46 | 12 | 13 | 21 | 50 | 71 | −21 | 49 | |
| 21 | Derby County | 46 | 11 | 11 | 24 | 36 | 58 | −22 | 44 | |
| 22 | Wycombe Wanderers (R) | 46 | 11 | 10 | 25 | 39 | 69 | −30 | 43 | Relegation to EFL League One |
| 23 | Rotherham United (R) | 46 | 11 | 9 | 26 | 44 | 60 | −16 | 42 | Relegation to EFL League One |
| 24 | Sheffield Wednesday (R) | 46 | 12 | 11 | 23 | 40 | 61 | −21 | 41 (Note: Sheffield Wednesday received a 12 point deduction for breaching the League's Profitability and Sustainability Rules. This was later reduced to 6 points by an Independent League Arbitration panel.) | Relegation to EFL League One |

Source: EFL Official Website
Rules for classification: 1) Points; 2) Goal difference; 3) Number of goals scored; 4) Head-to-head results; 5) Wins; 6) Away goals; 7) Penalty points (sec 9.5); 8) 12-point sending off offences
(R) Relegated

==== Results summary ====
| Overall | | | | | | | | Home | | | | | | Away | | | | | |
| Pld | W | D | L | GF | GA | GD | Pts | W | D | L | GF | GA | GD | W | D | L | GF | GA | GD |
|---|---|---|---|---|---|---|---|---|---|---|---|---|---|---|---|---|---|---|---|
| 46 | 11 | 10 | 25 | 39 | 69 | −30 | 43 | 7 | 5 | 11 | 17 | 28 | −11 | 4 | 5 | 14 | 22 | 41 | −19 |

Last updated: 8 May 2021.

==== Results by matchday ====
| Matchday | 1 | 2 | 3 | 4 | 5 | 6 | 7 | 8 | 9 | 10 | 11 | 12 | 13 | 14 | 15 | 16 | 17 | 18 | 19 | 20 | 21 | 22 | 23 | 24 | 25 | 26 | 27 | 28 | 29 | 30 | 31 | 32 | 33 | 34 | 35 | 36 | 37 | 38 | 39 | 40 | 41 | 42 | 43 | 44 | 45 | 46 |
|---|---|---|---|---|---|---|---|---|---|---|---|---|---|---|---|---|---|---|---|---|---|---|---|---|---|---|---|---|---|---|---|---|---|---|---|---|---|---|---|---|---|---|---|---|---|---|
| Ground | H | A | H | A | H | A | A | H | H | A | A | H | H | A | H | A | A | H | A | H | A | H | H | A | H | H | A | A | H | A | H | H | A | A | A | H | H | A | H | A | H | A | H | A | H | A |
| Result | L | L | L | L | L | L | L | D | W | W | L | D | D | D | L | D | L | L | L | D | L | W | L | L | D | L | L | W | L | D | W | L | L | L | L | W | L | D | W | W | L | D | W | L | W | W |
| Position | 20 | 23 | 23 | 23 | 23 | 23 | 23 | 23 | 23 | 22 | 22 | 22 | 22 | 22 | 22 | 22 | 23 | 23 | 23 | 24 | 24 | 24 | 24 | 24 | 24 | 24 | 24 | 24 | 24 | 24 | 24 | 24 | 24 | 24 | 24 | 24 | 24 | 24 | 24 | 24 | 24 | 24 | 24 | 24 | 24 | 22 |

Updated to match(es) played on 8 May 2021. Source:
A = Away; H = Home; W = Win; D = Draw; L = Loss

==== Matches ====
The EFL Championship fixtures were released on 21 August 2020.

| 12 September 2020 1 | Wycombe Wanderers | 0–1 | Rotherham United | High Wycombe |
| 12:30 BST | Bloomfield (yellow card) 22' | Report | Harding (yellow card) 72'; Ihiekwe 90+2' | Stadium: Adams Park; Attendance: Behind closed doors Referee: James Linington |

| 19 September 2020 2 | Blackburn Rovers | 5–0 | Wycombe Wanderers | Blackburn |
| 15:00 BST | Armstrong 16' (pen.), 33', 83'; Dolan 20'; Williams 67' | Report | Stewart (yellow card) 34'; Charles (red card) 57' | Stadium: Ewood Park; Attendance: Behind closed doors Referee: Peter Bankes |

| 26 September 2020 3 | Wycombe Wanderers | 0–2 | Swansea City | High Wycombe |
| 12:30 BST | Onyedinma (yellow card) 11'; Parker (yellow card) 85' | Report | Ayew 13'; Lowe 23' | Stadium: Adams Park; Attendance: Behind closed doors Referee: Geoff Eltringham |

| 3 October 2020 4 | Luton Town | 2–0 | Wycombe Wanderers | Luton |
| 15:00 BST | Cornick (yellow card) 53'; Ruddock 59'; Lee 89' | Report | Kashket (yellow card) 90' | Stadium: Kenilworth Road; Attendance: Behind closed doors Referee: Graham Scott |

| 17 October 2020 5 | Wycombe Wanderers | 1–2 | Millwall | High Wycombe |
| 15:00 BST | Kashket 9'; Knight (yellow card) 75' | Report | Wallace 48'; Leonard 63' | Stadium: Adams Park; Attendance: Behind closed doors Referee: Andy Madley |

| 20 October 2020 6 | Reading | 1–0 | Wycombe Wanderers | Reading |
| 20:00 BST | João (yellow card) 35' (goal) 64'; Rionomhota (yellow card) 78' | Report | | Stadium: Madejski Stadium; Attendance: Behind closed doors Referee: Andy Davies |

| 24 October 2020 7 | Norwich City | 2–1 | Wycombe Wanderers | Norwich |
| 15:00 BST | Pukki 3'; Gibson (yellow card) 15'; Vrančić 90+1'; Idah (red card) 90+5' | Report | Kashket 12'; Onyedinma (yellow card) 45+4' | Stadium: Carrow Road; Attendance: Behind closed doors Referee: Gavin Ward |

| 27 October 2020 8 | Wycombe Wanderers | 1–1 | Watford | High Wycombe |
| 19:45 GMT | Stewart 66' | Report | Sarr 52'; Femenía (yellow card) 80' | Stadium: Adams Park; Attendance: Behind closed doors Referee: John Brooks |

| 31 October 2020 9 | Wycombe Wanderers | 1–0 | Sheffield Wednesday | High Wycombe |
| 15:00 GMT | Wheeler 45+3'; Jacobson (yellow card) 46'; Allsop (yellow card) 90+2' | Report | Paterson (yellow card) 32'; Bannan (yellow card) 49' | Stadium: Adams Park; Attendance: Behind closed doors Referee: Keith Stroud |

| 4 November 2020 10 | Birmingham City | 1–2 | Wycombe Wanderers | Bordesley |
| 19:45 GMT | Roberts 40'; Šunjić (yellow card) 69' | Report | Kashket 75'; Pedersen 90+1' (o.g.) | Stadium: St Andrew's; Attendance: Behind closed doors Referee: Josh Smith |

| 7 November 2020 11 | Nottingham Forest | 2–0 | Wycombe Wanderers | West Bridgford |
| 15:00 GMT | Guerrero (yellow card) 13'; Taylor 28', 74' | Report | Thompson (yellow card) 67'; Grimmer (yellow card) 90+2' | Stadium: City Ground; Attendance: Behind closed doors Referee: Matt Donohue |

| 21 November 2020 12 | Wycombe Wanderers | 0–0 | Brentford | High Wycombe |
| 15:00 GMT | Kashket (yellow card) 45+1'; Samuel (yellow card) 63'; Stewart (yellow card) 64'; Horgan (yellow card) 89' | Report | Canós (yellow card) 70'; Toney (yellow card) 90+4' | Stadium: Adams Park; Attendance: Behind closed doors Referee: Lee Mason |

| 24 November 2020 13 | Wycombe Wanderers | 0–0 | Huddersfield Town | High Wycombe |
| 19:00 GMT | | Report | Sarr (yellow card) 44' | Stadium: Adams Park; Attendance: Behind closed doors Referee: Steve Martin |

| 28 November 2020 14 | Derby County | 1–1 | Wycombe Wanderers | Derby |
| 15:00 GMT | Holmes 36' | Report | Kashket (yellow card) 31'; Bloomfield 81' | Stadium: Pride Park Stadium; Attendance: Behind closed doors Referee: Jeremy Simpson |

| 2 December 2020 15 | Wycombe Wanderers | 0–1 | Stoke City | High Wycombe |
| 19:45 GMT | Samuel (yellow card) 15'; Jacobson (yellow card) 67' | Report | Cousins (yellow card) 57'; Powell 72'; McClean (yellow card) 73'; Chester (yellow card) 80'; Clucas (yellow card) 90+6' | Stadium: Adams Park; Attendance: 1,000; Referee: Darren Bond |

| 5 December 2020 16 | Preston North End | 2–2 | Wycombe Wanderers | Deepdale |
| 15:00 GMT | Barkhuizen 14'; McCarthy 87' (o.g.) | Report | Knight (yellow card) 26'; McCleary 48'; Kashket 75' (yellow card) 86'; Grimmer (yellow card) 83' | Stadium: Deepdale; Attendance: Behind closed doors Referee: James Linington |

| 9 December 2020 17 | Barnsley | 2–1 | Wycombe Wanderers | Barnsley |
| 19:45 GMT | Styles 31' (yellow card) 80'; Woodrow 61' (pen.); Mowatt (yellow card) 73'; Brittain (yellow card) 77' | Report | Jacobson 49' (pen.) (yellow card) 81'; Allsop (yellow card) 60'; Grimmer (yellow card) 73' | Stadium: Oakwell; Attendance: Behind closed doors Referee: Geoff Eltringham |

| 12 December 2020 18 | Wycombe Wanderers | 1–2 | Coventry City | High Wycombe |
| 15:00 GMT | Jacobson 61' (pen.); McCleary (yellow card) 71' | Report | Kelly 34', 45+4'; Wilson (yellow card) 61'; Sheaf (yellow card) 72'; Dabo (yellow card) 76'; Biamou (yellow card) 90+3' | Stadium: Adams Park; Attendance: 2,000; Referee: Andy Davies |

| 15 December 2020 19 | Bournemouth | 1–0 | Wycombe Wanderers | Kings Park |
| 19:45 GMT | Billing (yellow card) 55'; Stanislas 68' | Report | McCarthy (yellow card) 18'; Pattison (red card) 64' | Stadium: Dean Court; Attendance: 2,000; Referee: Matt Donohue |

| 19 December 2020 20 | Wycombe Wanderers | 1–1 | Queens Park Rangers | High Wycombe |
| 15:00 GMT | Jacobson (yellow card) 51'; Allsop (yellow card) 86'; Mehmeti 88' | Report | McCarthy 29' (o.g.); Hämäläinen (yellow card) 90+2' | Stadium: Adams Park; Attendance: Behind closed doors Referee: Gavin Ward |

| 26 December 2020 21 | Bristol City | 2–1 | Wycombe Wanderers | Bristol |
| 15:00 GMT | Martin 23'; Diédhiou 87' | Report | McCleary 68'; Jacobson (yellow card) 89'; Adeniran (yellow card) 90+3' | Stadium: Ashton Gate; Attendance: Behind closed doors Referee: Keith Stroud |

| 29 December 2020 22 | Wycombe Wanderers | 2–1 | Cardiff City | High Wycombe |
| 19:45 GMT | Tafazolli 33'; Thompson (yellow card) 45+3'; Wheeler 63'; Ikpeazu (yellow card) 78' | Report | Bennett (yellow card) 88'; Bacuna (yellow card) 90'; Hoilett 90+3' | Stadium: Adams Park; Attendance: Behind closed doors Referee: Leigh Doughty |

| 2 January 2021 23 | Wycombe Wanderers | 1–3 | Middlesbrough | High Wycombe |
| 15:00 GMT | Ikpeazu 3'; Mehmeti (yellow card) 43'; Knight (yellow card) 70' | Report | Browne 30'; Tavernier 36' (yellow card) 83'; Bola (yellow card) 65'; Bettinelli (yellow card) 69'; Akpom 81' | Stadium: Adams Park; Attendance: Behind closed doors Referee: Jarred Gillett |

| 16 January 2021 | Queens Park Rangers | Postponed | Wycombe Wanderers | White City |
| 15:00 GMT | | | | Stadium: Kiyan Prince Foundation Stadium |
Note: The match was postponed on 15 January 2021 due to positive COVID-19 tests among Wycombe Wanderers' players and staff.

| 19 January 2021 | Sheffield Wednesday | Postponed | Wycombe Wanderers | Owlerton |
| 19:45 GMT | | | | Stadium: Hillsborough Stadium |
Note: The match was postponed on 13 January 2021 due to positive COVID-19 tests among both Sheffield Wednesdays' and Wycombe Wanderers' players and staff.

| 23 January 2021 | Wycombe Wanderers | Postponed | Birmingham City | High Wycombe |
| 15:00 GMT | | | | Stadium: Adams Park |
Note: On 14 January, the match was postponed due to Wycombe Wanderers' involvement in the fourth round of the FA Cup.

| 30 January 2021 24 | Brentford | 7–2 | Wycombe Wanderers | Brentford |
| 15:00 GMT | Pinnock 9'; Fosu 50'; Toney 41', 56' (pen.), 86'; Canós 81'; Dasilva 89' | Report | Ikpeazu 14'; Muskwe 43'; Wheeler (yellow card) 45+3' | Stadium: Brentford Community Stadium; Attendance: Behind closed doors Referee: Michael Salisbury |

| 2 February 2021 25 | Wycombe Wanderers | 0–0 | Birmingham City | High Wycombe |
| 19:00 GMT | | Report | Roberts (red card) 87' | Stadium: Adams Park; Attendance: Behind closed doors Referee: John Brooks |

| 6 February 2021 26 | Wycombe Wanderers | 0–3 | Nottingham Forest | High Wycombe |
| 15:00 GMT | | Report | Murray 6', 54' (pen.); Knockaert 72' | Stadium: Adams Park; Attendance: Behind closed doors Referee: James Linington |

| 9 February 2021 27 | Sheffield Wednesday | 2–0 | Wycombe Wanderers | Owlerton |
| 19:00 GMT | Rhodes 34'; Reach 76' | Report | Obita (yellow card) 47'; Tafazolli (yellow card) 63' | Stadium: Hillsborough; Attendance: Behind closed doors Referee: Gavin Ward |

| 13 February 2021 28 | Huddersfield Town | 2–3 | Wycombe Wanderers | Huddersfield |
| 15:00 GMT | Bacuna 18'; Mbenza 41' (yellow card) 57'; Pipa (yellow card) 62'; Holmes (yellow card) 79'; Hogg (yellow card) 86' | Report | Tafazolli (yellow card) 23'; Mehmeti 45+3'; Jacobson 63' (pen.); Grimmer (yellow card) 71'; Stewart (yellow card) 82'; Knight 87'; Ikpeazu (yellow card) 90+6' | Stadium: John Smith's Stadium; Attendance: Behind closed doors Referee: Keith Stroud |

| 16 February 2021 29 | Wycombe Wanderers | 1–2 | Derby County | High Wycombe |
| 19:45 GMT | Allsop (yellow card) 16'; Ikpeazu 48' (pen.); Stewart (yellow card) 53' | Report | Ikpeazu 16' (o.g.); Mengi (yellow card) 63'; Wisdom (yellow card) 69' (goal) 90+4' | Stadium: Adams Park; Attendance: Behind closed doors Referee: Kevin Friend |

| 20 February 2021 30 | Millwall | 0–0 | Wycombe Wanderers | Bermondsey |
| 15:00 GMT | Wallace (yellow card) 26'; Hutchinson (yellow card) 53' | Report | Mehmeti (yellow card) 86' | Stadium: The Den; Attendance: Behind closed doors Referee: Jarred Gillett |

| 23 February 2021 31 | Wycombe Wanderers | 1–0 | Reading | High Wycombe |
| 19:45 GMT | Knight (yellow card) 41'; McCleary (yellow card) 45+1'; Onyedinma 49'; Tafazolli (red card) 69'; Ikpeazu (penalty missed) 85' | Report | Joao (penalty missed) 70'; Puscas (yellow card) 83'; McIntyre (yellow card) 84' | Stadium: Adams Park; Attendance: Behind closed doors Referee: Dean Whitestone |

| 28 February 2021 32 | Wycombe Wanderers | 0–2 | Norwich City | High Wycombe |
| 12:00 GMT | Wheeler (yellow card) 52'; Gape (yellow card) 57'; McCleary (yellow card) 60' | Report | Pukki 51'; Buendía (yellow card) 74'; Idah 87' | Stadium: Adams Park; Attendance: Behind closed doors Referee: Robert Jones |

| 3 March 2021 33 | Watford | 2–0 | Wycombe Wanderers | Watford |
| 19:00 GMT | Gray 14', 57' | Report | | Stadium: Vicarage Road; Attendance: Behind closed doors Referee: Geoff Eltringham |

| 6 March 2021 34 | Stoke City | 2–0 | Wycombe Wanderers | Stoke-on-Trent |
| 15:00 GMT | Powell (yellow card) 39'; Clarke (yellow card) 54'; Norrington-Davies 64'; Souttar 69'; Chester (yellow card) 76' | Report | Knight (yellow card) 59'; McCarthy (yellow card) 80' | Stadium: Bet365 Stadium; Attendance: Behind closed doors Referee: Andy Woolmer |

| 9 March 2021 35 | Queens Park Rangers | 1–0 | Wycombe Wanderers | Shepherd's Bush |
| 19:00 GMT | Chair 23' | Report | | Stadium: Kiyan Prince Foundation Stadium; Attendance: Behind closed doors Referee: Simon Hooper |

| 13 March 2021 36 | Wycombe Wanderers | 1–0 | Preston North End | High Wycombe |
| 15:00 GMT | Tafazolli 27'; Horgan (yellow card) 38'; McCleary (yellow card) 56' | Report | Magiure (yellow card) 58' | Stadium: Adams Park; Attendance: Behind closed doors Referee: Tim Robinson |

| 17 March 2021 37 | Wycombe Wanderers | 1–3 | Barnsley | High Wycombe |
| 19:00 GMT | Ikpeazu 85'; Knight (yellow card) 90'; Jacobson (yellow card) 90' | Report | Woodrow 45+2' (pen.); Dike 49', 81'; Styles (yellow card) 59'; Mowatt (red card) 73'; Morris (yellow card) 77'; Sibbick (yellow card) 90' | Stadium: Adams Park; Attendance: Behind Closed Doors; Referee: Darren Bond |

| 20 March 2021 38 | Coventry City | 0–0 | Wycombe Wanderers | Bordesley |
| 15:00 GMT | | Report | Thompson (yellow card) 53'; Stewart (yellow card) 79' | Stadium: St Andrew's; Attendance: Behind Closed Doors; Referee: Tony Harrington |

| 2 April 2021 39 | Wycombe Wanderers | 1–0 | Blackburn Rovers | High Wycombe |
| 15:00 BST | Onyedinma 47'; Thompson (yellow card) 85' | Report | Holtby (yellow card) 25' | Stadium: Adams Park; Attendance: Behind Closed Doors; Referee: David Webb |

| 5 April 2021 40 | Rotherham United | 0–3 | Wycombe Wanderers | Rotherham |
| 15:00 BST | Crooks (yellow card) 52' | Report | Muskwe 2'; McCarthy 24'; Wheeler (yellow card) 52' (goal) 83'; Ikpeazu (yellow card) 68' | Stadium: New York Stadium; Attendance: Behind Closed Doors; Referee: James Linnington |

| 10 April 2021 41 | Wycombe Wanderers | 1–3 | Luton Town | High Wycombe |
| 15:00 BST | Mehmeti 37' (pen.), (yellow card) 56'; Knight (red card) 57' | Report | Bradley (yellow card) 31'; Moncur 80'; LuaLua 85'; Adebayo 88' | Stadium: Adams Park; Attendance: Behind Closed Doors; Referee: Oliver Langford |

| 17 April 2021 42 | Swansea City | 2–2 | Wycombe Wanderers | Swansea |
| 12:30 BST | Bennett (yellow card) 5'; Lowe 80'; Cullen 82' | Report | Muskwe 46' (yellow card) 71'; McCleary 51'; McCarthy (yellow card) 79'; Stockdale (yellow card) 80' | Stadium: Liberty Stadium; Attendance: Behind Closed Doors; Referee: Keith Stroud |

| 21 April 2021 43 | Wycombe Wanderers | 2–1 | Bristol City | High Wycombe |
| 19:00 BST | Ikpeazu 65'; Pattison (yellow card) 81'; Akinfenwa 90+3' (pen.) | Report | Bakinson 28' | Stadium: Adams Park; Attendance: Behind Closed Doors; Referee: Dean Whitestone |

| 24 April 2021 44 | Cardiff City | 2–1 | Wycombe Wanderers | Leckwith |
| 15:00 BST | Moore 22', 71'; Nelson (yellow card) 29'; Murphy (yellow card) 58'; Williams (yellow card) 90'; Vaulks (red card) 90+5' | Report | Jacobson 43'; Thompson (yellow card) 76' | Stadium: Cardiff City Stadium; Attendance: Behind Closed Doors; Referee: Matthew Donohue |

| 1 May 2021 45 | Wycombe Wanderers | 1–0 | AFC Bournemouth | High Wycombe |
| 15:00 BST | Ikpeazu 4'; Jacobson (yellow card) 53' | Report | Wilshere (yellow card) 90' | Stadium: Adams Park; Attendance: Behind Closed Doors; Referee: Geoff Eltringham |

| 8 May 2021 46 | Middlesbrough | 0–3 | Wycombe Wanderers | Middlesbrough |
| 12:30 BST | | Report | Onyedinma 14'; McCleary 33'; Adeniran (yellow card) 45'; McCarthy 56' | Stadium: Riverside Stadium; Attendance: Behind Closed Doors; Referee: Martin Atkinson |

=== FA Cup ===
The third round draw was made on 30 November, with Premier League and EFL Championship clubs all entering the competition. The draw for the fourth and fifth round were made on 11 January, conducted by Peter Crouch.

| 9 January 2021 Third round | Wycombe Wanderers | 4–1 | Preston North End | High Wycombe |
| 15:00 GMT | Onyedinma 3'; Jacobson 9' (pen.); Knight 25'; Allsop (yellow card) 42'; Horgan (yellow card) 61'; Adeniran (yellow card) 64'; Samuel 82' | Report | Riis 43' (pen.) | Stadium: Adams Park; Attendance: Behind closed doors Referee: Matt Donohue |

| 25 January 2021 Fourth round | Wycombe Wanderers | 1–4 | Tottenham Hotspur | High Wycombe |
| 19:45 GMT | Onyedinma 25' | Report | Bale 45+2'; Winks 86'; Ndombele 88', 90+3' | Stadium: Adams Park; Attendance: Behind closed doors Referee: Jonathan Moss |

=== EFL Cup ===
The first round was split into 'northern' and 'southern' sections, with Wycombe Wanderers entered into the southern section. The first round draw was made on 18 August 2020.

| 6 September 2020 First round | Brentford | 1–1 (4–2 p) | Wycombe Wanderers | Brentford |
| 12:00 BST | Pinnock 32' | Report | Gape (red card) 48'; Horgan 76' | Stadium: Brentford Community Stadium; Attendance: Behind closed doors Referee: Charles Breakspear |
| | Penalties |
| | Toney (penalty scored); Žambůrek (penalty scored); Jensen (penalty missed); Canós (penalty scored); Forss (penalty scored) | | Jacobson (penalty scored); Freeman (penalty missed); Horgan (penalty scored); Kashket (penalty missed) |

== Statistics ==
=== Appearances and goals ===
As of 8 May 2021

| No. | Pos | Nat | Player | Total | | Championship | | FA Cup | | EFL Cup | |
| No. | Pos | Nat | Player | Apps | Goals | Apps | Goals | Apps | Goals | Apps | Goals |
|---|---|---|---|---|---|---|---|---|---|---|---|
| 1 | GK | (England) ENG | Ryan Allsop | 31 | 0 | 29 | 0 | 1 | 0 | 1 | 0 |
| 2 | DF | (Scotland) SCO | Jack Grimmer | 42 | 0 | 40 | 0 | 1 | 0 | 1 | 0 |
| 3 | DF | (Wales) WAL | Joe Jacobson | 40 | 5 | 37 | 4 | 2 | 1 | 1 | 0 |
| 4 | MF | (England) ENG | Dominic Gape | 16 | 0 | 14 | 0 | 1 | 0 | 1 | 0 |
| 5 | DF | (England) ENG | Anthony Stewart | 33 | 1 | 32 | 1 | 0 | 0 | 1 | 0 |
| 6 | DF | (England) ENG | Ryan Tafazolli | 21 | 2 | 20 | 2 | 1 | 0 | 0 | 0 |
| 7 | MF | (England) ENG | David Wheeler | 41 | 3 | 38 | 3 | 2 | 0 | 1 | 0 |
| 8 | MF | (England) ENG | Alex Pattison | 6 | 0 | 6 | 0 | 0 | 0 | 0 | 0 |
| 9 | FW | (Uganda) UGA | Uche Ikpeazu | 33 | 6 | 31 | 6 | 2 | 0 | 0 | 0 |
| 10 | MF | (England) ENG | Matt Bloomfield | 19 | 1 | 16 | 1 | 2 | 0 | 1 | 0 |
| 11 | FW | (England) ENG | Scott Kashket | 31 | 4 | 29 | 4 | 1 | 0 | 1 | 0 |
| 12 | DF | (England) ENG | Josh Knight | 39 | 2 | 37 | 1 | 2 | 1 | 0 | 0 |
| 13 | GK | (Scotland) SCO | Cameron Yates | 0 | 0 | 0 | 0 | 0 | 0 | 0 | 0 |
| 15 | FW | (Zimbabwe) ZIM | Admiral Muskwe | 19 | 3 | 17 | 3 | 2 | 0 | 0 | 0 |
| 16 | DF | (United States) USA | Giles Phillips | 0 | 0 | 0 | 0 | 0 | 0 | 0 | 0 |
| 17 | FW | (Republic of Ireland) IRL | Daryl Horgan | 42 | 1 | 40 | 0 | 1 | 0 | 1 | 1 |
| 18 | MF | (England) ENG | Curtis Thompson | 33 | 0 | 33 | 0 | 0 | 0 | 0 | 0 |
| 19 | FW | (Jamaica) JAM | Garath McCleary | 33 | 4 | 32 | 4 | 1 | 0 | 0 | 0 |
| 20 | FW | (England) ENG | Adebayo Akinfenwa | 35 | 1 | 33 | 1 | 2 | 0 | 0 | 0 |
| 21 | DF | (England) ENG | Darius Charles | 7 | 0 | 5 | 0 | 1 | 0 | 1 | 0 |
| 22 | MF | (England) ENG | Nick Freeman (Note: Nick Freeman is currently on loan at Leyton Orient.) | 8 | 0 | 7 | 0 | 0 | 0 | 1 | 0 |
| 23 | MF | (Nigeria) NGA | Fred Onyedinma | 46 | 5 | 43 | 3 | 2 | 2 | 1 | 0 |
| 24 | MF | (England) ENG | Dennis Adeniran | 22 | 0 | 21 | 0 | 1 | 0 | 0 | 0 |
| 25 | FW | (Wales) WAL | Alex Samuel | 23 | 1 | 21 | 0 | 1 | 1 | 1 | 0 |
| 26 | DF | (England) ENG | Jason McCarthy | 26 | 2 | 24 | 2 | 2 | 0 | 0 | 0 |
| 27 | DF | (England) ENG | Jordan Obita | 9 | 0 | 9 | 0 | 0 | 0 | 0 | 0 |
| 28 | MF | (Nigeria) NGA | Nnamdi Ofoborh | 8 | 0 | 8 | 0 | 0 | 0 | 0 | 0 |
| 31 | GK | (England) ENG | David Stockdale | 17 | 0 | 17 | 0 | 0 | 0 | 0 | 0 |
| 32 | GK | (England) ENG | Curtis Anderson | 0 | 0 | 0 | 0 | 0 | 0 | 0 | 0 |
| 33 | MF | (Albania) ALB | Anis Mehmeti | 29 | 3 | 29 | 3 | 0 | 0 | 0 | 0 |
| 34 | DF | (Saint Kitts and Nevis) SKN | Andre Burley | 0 | 0 | 0 | 0 | 0 | 0 | 0 | 0 |
| 35 | FW | (Cyprus) CYP | Andronicos Georgiou | 0 | 0 | 0 | 0 | 0 | 0 | 0 | 0 |
| 36 | FW | (England) ENG | Malachi Linton | 0 | 0 | 0 | 0 | 0 | 0 | 0 | 0 |
| 37 | DF | (England) ENG | James Clark | 0 | 0 | 0 | 0 | 0 | 0 | 0 | 0 |
| 38 | DF | (England) ENG | Chris Fornio-Joseph | 0 | 0 | 0 | 0 | 0 | 0 | 0 | 0 |
Players who left the club before the end of the season:
| 27 | FW | (Antigua and Barbuda) ATG | Josh Parker | 4 | 0 | 3 | 0 | 0 | 0 | 1 | 0 |
