= 2018–19 Wycombe Wanderers F.C. season =

Wycombe Wanderers
2018–19 season
- Chairman: Trevor Stroud
- Manager: Gareth Ainsworth
- Stadium: Adams Park
- League One: 17th
- FA Cup: First round (vs. Luton Town)
- EFL Cup: Third round (vs. Norwich City)
- EFL Trophy: Group stage
- Top goalscorer: League: Adebayo Akinfenwa; Joe Jacobson (7 each); All: Adebayo Akinfenwa (8)
- Highest home attendance: 8,422 (vs. Sunderland, 9 March 2019)
- Lowest home attendance: 595 (vs. Fulham U23s, 18 September 2018)
- Average home league attendance: 5,302
- Biggest win: 3–0 (vs. Rochdale, 23 October 2018)
- Biggest defeat: 0–3(twice) (at Doncaster Rovers, 11 August 2018) (vs. Oxford United, 6 November 2018, EFL Trophy)
Home colours	Away colours	Third colours

The 2018–19 season was Wycombe Wanderers' 132nd season in existence and their 26th consecutive season in the Football League. This was their first season in EFL League One since the 2011–12 season. They achieved automatic promotion after winning their game against Chesterfield on 28 April 2018 the previous season.

== Competitions ==
=== Pre-season ===
Wycombe Wanderers announced on 16 May 2018 that they will face Brentford during their pre-season run-in. On 21 May 2018, two friendlies were announced: the first against Maidenhead United and the second against Havant & Waterlooville. A fourth friendly, a home match against West Ham United, was announced on 12 June. Their final fixture, away to Chesham United, was added on 27 June.

14 July 2018 Friendly	Wycombe Wanderers	0–1	West Ham United	High Wycombe
15:00 BST		Report	Arnautović 34'	Stadium: Adams Park; Attendance: 2,657

17 July 2018 Friendly	Wycombe Wanderers	0–1	Brentford	High Wycombe
19:45 BST		Report	Forss 76' (pen.)	Stadium: Adams Park; Attendance: 1,315

21 July 2018 Friendly	Havant & Waterlooville	2–0	Wycombe Wanderers	Havant
15:00 BST	Pavey 10' (pen.), 39' (pen.)	Report		Stadium: Westleigh Park

24 July 2018 Friendly	Chesham United	1–2	Wycombe Wanderers	Chesham
19:30 BST	Pearce 83'	Report	Saunders 50'; Mackail-Smith 88'	Stadium: The Meadow; Attendance: 762

27 July 2018 Friendly	Maidenhead United	1–1	Wycombe Wanderers	Maidenhead
19:45 BST	Bird 11'	Report	Williams 72'	Stadium: York Road

=== League One ===
==== League table ====
Pos	Team	Pld	W	D	L	GF	GA	GD	Pts
15	Bristol Rovers	46	13	15	18	47	50	−3	54
16	Rochdale	46	15	9	22	54	87	−33	54
17	Wycombe Wanderers	46	14	11	21	55	67	−12	53
18	Shrewsbury Town	46	12	16	18	51	59	−8	52
19	Southend United	46	14	8	24	55	68	−13	50

Source: EFL Official Website
Rules for classification: 1) Points; 2) Goal difference; 3) Number of goals scored; 4) Head-to-head results

==== Results summary ====
Overall								Home						Away					
Pld	W	D	L	GF	GA	GD	Pts	W	D	L	GF	GA	GD	W	D	L	GF	GA	GD
46	14	11	21	55	67	−12	53	10	5	8	28	26	+2	4	6	13	27	41	−14

Last updated: 4 May 2019.

==== Results by matchday ====
Matchday	1	2	3	4	5	6	7	8	9	10	11	12	13	14	15	16	17	18	19	20	21	22	23	24	25	26	27	28	29	30	31	32	33	34	35	36	37	38	39	40	41	42	43	44	45	46
Ground	H	A	H	A	A	H	A	H	A	H	A	H	A	H	H	A	H	A	H	A	H	A	H	A	A	H	H	A	H	A	H	A	A	H	A	H	H	A	A	H	H	A	A	H	A	H
Result	D	L	L	D	W	D	L	D	D	L	D	W	L	W	W	L	W	D	W	W	W	D	L	L	L	L	W	W	W	D	D	L	L	L	L	D	L	L	L	L	L	W	L	W	L	W
Position	13	20	23	23	17	16	18	19	18	20	21	17	18	17	14	15	15	15	12	10	9	9	9	12	13	14	13	11	9	9	9	10	11	12	12	12	13	13	17	19	20	17	18	17	18	17

Updated to match(es) played on 4 May 2019. Source: Statto.com
A = Away; H = Home; W = Win; D = Draw; L = Loss

==== Matches ====
The EFL League One fixtures were announced on 21 June 2018.

4 August 2018 1	Wycombe Wanderers	0–0	Blackpool	High Wycombe
15:00 BST	El-Abd (yellow card) 40'; Harriman (yellow card) 53' (yellow-red card) 89'	Report	Taylor (yellow card) 7'	Stadium: Adams Park; Attendance: 5,115; Referee: Nick Kinseley

11 August 2018 2	Doncaster Rovers	3–0	Wycombe Wanderers	Doncaster
15:00 BST	Butler (yellow card) 16'; Whiteman (yellow card) 24'; Wilks 55'; Rowe (yellow card) 76'; Wright 78'; Marquis 80'	Report	El-Abd (yellow card) 50'; Stewart (yellow card) 76'; Gape (yellow card) 89'	Stadium: Keepmoat Stadium; Attendance: 7,122; Referee: Carl Boyeson

18 August 2018 3	Wycombe Wanderers	1–2	Bristol Rovers	High Wycombe
15:00 BST	Kashket 82'	Report	Clarke 4'; Craig 20'; Sercombe (yellow card) 62'; Payne (yellow card) 82'; Smith (yellow card) 90+4'	Stadium: Adams Park; Attendance: 4,858; Referee: Kevin Johnson

21 August 2018 4	Plymouth Argyle	1–1	Wycombe Wanderers	Plymouth
19:45 BST	Ladapo 4'	Report	Bloomfield 84' (yellow card) 85'	Stadium: Home Park; Attendance: 9,244; Referee: Ollie Yates

25 August 2018 5	Bradford City	1–2	Wycombe Wanderers	Bradford
15:00 BST	Colville 90+1'	Report	Mackail-Smith 28'; Gape (yellow card) 49'; Riley 52' (o.g.); Morris (yellow card) 72'	Stadium: Northern Commercials Stadium; Attendance: 15,563; Referee: Mark Heywood

1 September 2018 6	Wycombe Wanderers	1–1	Luton Town	High Wycombe
15:00 BST	Jacobson 15' (pen.); Morris (yellow card) 26'; Thompson (yellow card) 90+2'; Jombati (yellow card) 90+5'	Report	Bradley (yellow card) 5'; Rea (yellow card) 58'; Pearson 68'	Stadium: Adams Park; Attendance: 6,072; Referee: Darren England

8 September 2018 7	Charlton Athletic	3–2	Wycombe Wanderers	Charlton, London
15:00 BST	Jombati 32' (o.g.); Sarr (yellow card) 34' (goal) 80'; Pratley (yellow card) 52'; Taylor 71'; Steer (yellow card) 90+5'	Report	Williams 7'; Jombati (yellow card) 64'; Cowan-Hall 90'	Stadium: The Valley; Attendance: 10,358; Referee: Graham Salisbury

15 September 2018 8	Wycombe Wanderers	0–0	Oxford United	High Wycombe
15:00 BST	Jacobson (yellow card) 71'; Jombati (yellow card) 76'; McCarthy (yellow card) 80'; Gape (yellow card) 85'	Report	Baptiste (yellow card) 79'; Mousinho (yellow card) 80'	Stadium: Adams Park; Attendance: 6,879; Referee: David Webb

22 September 2018 9	Portsmouth	2–2	Wycombe Wanderers	Milton, Portsmouth
15:00 BST	Lowe (yellow card) 47'; Evans 57'; Thompson (yellow card) 62'; Burgess (yellow card) 69'; Pitman 86'	Report	Morris 21'; McCarthy (yellow card) 36'; Jombati (yellow card) 40'; Onyedinma (yellow card) 42'; Kashket (yellow card) 45+1'; Jacobson 89' (pen.)	Stadium: Fratton Park; Attendance: 18,648; Referee: Craig Hicks

29 September 2018 10	Wycombe Wanderers	2–3	Southend United	High Wycombe
15:00 BST	Mackail-Smith 83'; Akinfenwa 86'	Report	Robinson 38'; Hopper 53'; Cox 57'	Stadium: Adams Park; Attendance: 4,784; Referee: Tom Nield

2 October 2018 11	Fleetwood Town	1–1	Wycombe Wanderers	Fleetwood
19:45 BST	Madden 37'; Eastham (yellow card) 48'	Report	Akinfenwa 56'; McCarthy (yellow card) 88'; Jombati (yellow card) 90+3'	Stadium: Highbury Stadium; Attendance: 2,304; Referee: Scott Oldham

6 October 2018 12	Wycombe Wanderers	2–1	Burton Albion	High Wycombe
15:00 BST	Jacobson 30' (pen.) (yellow card) 90+4'; Akinfenwa 37'; Bloomfield (yellow card) 81'; Cowan-Hall (yellow card) 87'	Report	Sordell 47'; Quinn (yellow card) 81'	Stadium: Adams Park; Attendance: 4,022; Referee: Charles Breakspear

13 October 2018 13	Coventry City	1–0	Wycombe Wanderers	Rowley's Green, Coventry
15:00 BST	Thomas (yellow card) 74'; Chaplin 82'	Report	Gape (yellow card) 68'; Williams (yellow card) 74'; Morris (yellow card) 89'	Stadium: Ricoh Arena; Attendance: 10,480; Referee: Nick Kinseley

20 October 2018 14	Wycombe Wanderers	3–2	Scunthorpe United	High Wycombe
15:00 BST	Gape (yellow card) 25' (goal) 27'; Onyedinma 53'; Allsop (red card) 81'; Jacobson (yellow card) 87'; Mackail-Smith 90+4'; Ma-Kalambay (yellow card) 90+9'; Thompson (yellow card) 90+10'	Report	Colclough 1'; Humphrys 7'; Dales (yellow card) 32'; Clarke (yellow card) 52'	Stadium: Adams Park; Attendance: 4,024; Referee: Alan Young

23 October 2018 15	Wycombe Wanderers	3–0	Rochdale	High Wycombe
19:45 BST	Morris 10'; Akinfenwa 67'; Onyedinma 72'	Report	Ntlhe (yellow card) 28'; Dooley (yellow card) 64'	Stadium: Adams Park; Attendance: 3,997; Referee: Brett Huxtable

27 October 2018 16	Walsall	3–2	Wycombe Wanderers	Bescot, Walsall
15:00 BST	Cook 36'; Osbourne 52'; Wilson (yellow card) 68'; Gape 84' (o.g.)	Report	Leahy 80' (o.g.); Samuel 90+3'	Stadium: Banks's Stadium; Attendance: 4,265; Referee: Neil Hair

3 November 2018 17	Wycombe Wanderers	1–0	Peterborough United	High Wycombe
15:00 GMT	Gape (yellow card) 31'; Morris 67'; El-Abd (yellow card) 80'	Report	Tafazolli (yellow card) 66'; Toney (yellow card) 90+1'	Stadium: Adams Park; Attendance: 5,225; Referee: Ben Toner

17 November 2018 18	Sunderland	1–1	Wycombe Wanderers	Sunderland
15:00 GMT	Honeyman (yellow card) 23'; Maja 84'	Report	Onyedinma 67'; Gape (yellow card) 71'	Stadium: Stadium of Light; Attendance: 30,727; Referee: Michael Salisbury

24 November 2018 19	Wycombe Wanderers	3–2	Shrewsbury Town	High Wycombe
15:00 GMT	El-Abd 11' (yellow card) 27'; Jacobson 40'; Samuel 71'; Stockdale (yellow card) 73'	Report	Amadi-Holloway 4'; Okenabirhie 73'	Stadium: Adams Park; Attendance: 4,598; Referee: Andy Haines

27 November 2018 20	Accrington Stanley	1–2	Wycombe Wanderers	Accrington
19:45 GMT	McConville 15'; Finley (yellow card) 44'; Hughes (yellow card) 71'	Report	Kashket 77'; Harriman (yellow card) 88'; Samuel 90+1'	Stadium: Wham Stadium; Attendance: 1,740; Referee: Scott Oldham

8 December 2018 21	Wycombe Wanderers	1–0	Barnsley	High Wycombe
15:00 GMT	Williams 55'	Report	Moncur (yellow card) 30'; McGeehan (yellow card) 86'	Stadium: Adams Park; Attendance: 5,225; Referee: Antony Coggins

15 December 2018 22	Gillingham	2–2	Wycombe Wanderers	Gillingham
15:00 GMT	Garmston (yellow card) 48'; Fuller (yellow card) 50'; Eaves 56'; Parker 76'	Report	El-Abd 12'; Tyson 17'	Stadium: Priestfield Stadium; Attendance: 4,687; Referee: Dean Whitestone

22 December 2018 23	Wycombe Wanderers	1–2	AFC Wimbledon	High Wycombe
15:00 GMT	Onyedinma 90+2'	Report	Appiah 29'; Hanson (yellow card) 53'; Jervis 90'	Stadium: Adams Park; Attendance: 5,814; Referee: John Busby

26 December 2018 24	Burton Albion	3–1	Wycombe Wanderers	Burton upon Trent
15:00 GMT	Akins 33', 45+4'; Templeton 34'; Hutchinson (yellow card) 67'	Report	Buxton 27' (o.g.); Thompson (yellow card) 66'; Kashket (yellow card) 69'; Jacobson (yellow card) 73'	Stadium: Pirelli Stadium; Attendance: 3,679; Referee: Michael Salisbury

29 December 2018 25	Scunthorpe United	1–0	Wycombe Wanderers	Scunthorpe
15:00 GMT	Wootton 8'; Borthwick-Jackson (yellow card) 44'; Ben El-Mhanni (yellow card) 50'; Novak (yellow card) 90+6'	Report	Samuel (yellow card) 36'; Thompson (yellow card) 84'	Stadium: Glanford Park; Attendance: 3,489; Referee: Darren Drysdale

1 January 2019 26	Wycombe Wanderers	0–2	Coventry City	High Wycombe
15:00 GMT	Thompson (yellow card) 27'; Jombati (yellow card) 90+3'	Report	Chaplin 34' (pen.); Clarke-Harris 62'	Stadium: Adams Park; Attendance: 6,183; Referee: Lee Collins

12 January 2019 27	Wycombe Wanderers	3–2	Doncaster Rovers	High Wycombe
15:00 GMT	Jacobson (yellow card) 75'; Cowan-Hall 77', 90+4' (yellow card) 90+5'; Gape (yellow card) 80'; Thompson 90' (yellow card) 90+9'; Allsop (yellow card) 90+8'	Report	Blair (yellow card) 46'; Marquis 60' (yellow card) 80'; Rowe 70'; Kane (yellow card) 84'; Butler (yellow card) 90+9'	Stadium: Adams Park; Attendance: 4,747; Referee: Trevor Kettle

19 January 2019 28	Bristol Rovers	0–1	Wycombe Wanderers	Horfield, Bristol
15:00 GMT	Payne (yellow card) 22'; Clarke (yellow card) 76'; Rodman (yellow card) 90+1'	Report	Thompson (yellow card) 50'; Jombati 57'; Freeman (yellow card) 63'	Stadium: Memorial Stadium; Attendance: 8,163; Referee: Ben Toner

26 January 2019 29	Wycombe Wanderers	1–0	Plymouth Argyle	High Wycombe
15:00 GMT	Songo'o 24' (o.g.); Jacobson (yellow card) 45+3'	Report	Fox (yellow card) 36'; Edwards (yellow card) 87'; Ladapo (yellow card) 90+7'	Stadium: Adams Park; Attendance: 5,691; Referee: Scott Oldham

29 January 2019 30	Blackpool	2–2	Wycombe Wanderers	Blackpool
19:45 GMT	Heneghan 50'; Pritchard 83' (pen.)	Report	Akinfenwa 12'; Jacobson 53' (yellow card) 66'; Allsop (yellow card) 69'	Stadium: Bloomfield Road; Attendance: 2,388; Referee: Martin Coy

2 February 2019 31	Wycombe Wanderers	0–0	Bradford City	High Wycombe
15:00 GMT	El-Abd (yellow card) 84'; Tyson (yellow card) 89'	Report		Stadium: Adams Park; Attendance: 4,586; Referee: Thomas Bramall

9 February 2019 32	Luton Town	3–0	Wycombe Wanderers	Luton
15:00 GMT	Collins 33' (yellow card) 50'; Hylton (yellow card) 39'; Moncur 85', 88'	Report	El-Abd (yellow card) 43'	Stadium: Kenilworth Road; Attendance: 10,072; Referee: Andy Davies

16 February 2019 33	Barnsley	2–1	Wycombe Wanderers	Barnsley
15:00 GMT	Woodrow 13' (pen.), 64'; McGeehan (yellow card) 90+4'	Report	Tyson (yellow card) 81'; Jombati (yellow card) 83'; McCarthy (yellow card) 90+4'; El-Abd (red card) 90+5'; Jacobson (yellow card) 90+7' (goal) 90+10' (pen.)	Stadium: Oakwell; Attendance: 11,821; Referee: Matt Donohue

23 February 2019 34	Wycombe Wanderers	0–1	Gillingham	High Wycombe
15:00 GMT		Report	Burke (yellow card) 66'; Charles-Cook 83'	Stadium: Adams Park; Attendance: 4,879; Referee: Carl Boyeson

2 March 2019 35	Peterborough United	4–2	Wycombe Wanderers	Peterborough
15:00 GMT	Godden 7', 10'; Maddison 31', 66'; Ward (yellow card) 81'; Cooper (yellow card) 90+3'	Report	Tafazolli 16' (o.g.); Jacobson (yellow card) 30'; Bloomfield 38'; Thompson (yellow card) 88'	Stadium: ABAX Stadium; Attendance: 6,484; Referee: Seb Stockbridge

9 March 2019 36	Wycombe Wanderers	1–1	Sunderland	High Wycombe
15:00 GMT	Samuel (yellow card) 11' (goal) 35'; Bean (yellow card) 55' (yellow-red card) 90+10'; Tyson (red card) 90+8'	Report	Cattermole (yellow card) 47'; McGeady (yellow card) 79'; Flanagan (yellow card) 86'; Watmore 90+4'; Honeyman (red card) 90+8'	Stadium: Adams Park; Attendance: 8,422; Referee: Lee Swabey

12 March 2019 37	Wycombe Wanderers	1–3	Accrington Stanley	High Wycombe
19:45 GMT	Cowan-Hall 23'; Allsop (yellow card) 45+10'	Report	Barlaser (yellow card) 45'; Kee 45+10' (pen.), 66' (pen.); Smyth 71'	Stadium: Adams Park; Attendance: 3,189; Referee: Kevin Johnson

16 March 2019 38	Shrewsbury Town	2–1	Wycombe Wanderers	Shrewsbury
15:00 GMT	Golbourne (yellow card) 39'; Norburn (yellow card) 76' (goal) 90+3' (pen.); Beckles 87' (yellow card) 90+6'	Report	McCarthy 67'; Jacobson (yellow card) 83'; Bean (yellow card) 90+4'	Stadium: Montgomery Waters Meadow; Attendance: 6,001; Referee: Trevor Kettle

23 March 2019	Wycombe Wanderers	Postponed	Charlton Athletic	High Wycombe
15:00 GMT				Stadium: Adams Park

30 March 2019 39	Oxford United	2–1	Wycombe Wanderers	Oxford
15:00 GMT	Browne (yellow card) 27'; Sinclair 30'; Ruffels 90+4' (yellow card) 90+5'	Report	El-Abd 21'; Jacobson (penalty missed) 37' (yellow card) 54'	Stadium: Kassam Stadium; Attendance: 9,250; Referee: Simon Hooper

6 April 2019 40	Wycombe Wanderers	2–3	Portsmouth	High Wycombe
15:00 BST	Bean 55'; Kashket 82'	Report	Lowe 17'; Clarke (yellow card) 45+1'; Pitman 46', 60'	Stadium: Adams Park; Attendance: 6,978; Referee: John Busby

9 April 2019 41	Wycombe Wanderers	0–1	Charlton Athletic	High Wycombe
19:45 BST	Jombati (yellow card) 20'; El-Abd (yellow card) 76'	Report	Pearce 35'; Cullen (yellow card) 55'	Stadium: Adams Park; Attendance: 5,487; Referee: Antony Coggins

13 April 2019 42	Southend United	0–2	Wycombe Wanderers	Southend-on-Sea
15:00 BST	Kightly (yellow card) 43'	Report	Kashket (yellow card) 47'; Akinfenwa (yellow card) 67' (goal) 69', 72'	Stadium: Roots Hall; Attendance: 7,689; Referee: David Coote

19 April 2019 43	Rochdale	1–0	Wycombe Wanderers	Rochdale
15:00 BST	Henderson 79'; Rathbone (yellow card) 83'	Report		Stadium: Crown Oil Arena; Attendance: 3,711; Referee: Andy Haines

22 April 2019 44	Wycombe Wanderers	1–0	Walsall	High Wycombe
15:00 BST	McCarthy 54'; Bloomfield (yellow card) 70'	Report	Johnson (yellow card) 13'; Laird (yellow card) 90+3'	Stadium: Adams Park; Attendance: 5,595; Referee: Charles Breakspear

27 April 2019 45	AFC Wimbledon	2–1	Wycombe Wanderers	Norbiton, London
15:00 BST	Pigott (penalty missed) 12' 38', 53'	Report	Allsop (yellow card) 11'; El-Abd (yellow card) 37'; Samuel 49'	Stadium: Cherry Red Records Stadium; Attendance: 4,850; Referee: Andy Davies

4 May 2019 46	Wycombe Wanderers	1–0	Fleetwood Town	High Wycombe
17:30 BST	Jacobson 75'	Report	Sowerby (yellow card) 25'; Eastham (yellow card) 31'; Cairns (yellow card) 76'	Stadium: Adams Park; Attendance: 5,575; Referee: Lee Swabey

=== FA Cup ===
The first round draw was made on 22 October 2018 at Hitchin Town's home ground Top Field, where Wycombe Wanderers were drawn away to Luton Town.

10 November 2018 First round	Luton Town	2–0	Wycombe Wanderers	Luton
15:00 GMT	Shinnie 41'; Cornick 71'	Report	McCarthy (yellow card) 35'; Bean (yellow card) 76'	Stadium: Kenilworth Road; Attendance: 5,343; Referee: Craig Hicks

=== EFL Cup ===
The draw for the first round was made on 15 June 2018, in which Wycombe Wanderers were drawn against Northampton Town. After winning their first round tie 7–6 on penalties after drawing 1–1, Wycombe Wanderers were drawn at home to Forest Green Rovers on 16 August 2018. The third round draw was made on 30 August 2018 by David Seaman and Joleon Lescott, and Wycombe were drawn to face Norwich City at home.

14 August 2018 First round	Wycombe Wanderers	1–1 (7–6 p)	Northampton Town	High Wycombe
19:45 BST	Williams 50'	Report	Hoskins 82'	Stadium: Adams Park; Attendance: 1,999; Referee: Steve Martin
	Penalties
	Jacobson (penalty scored); Morris (penalty scored); McCarthy (penalty scored); Mackail-Smith (penalty missed); Kashket (penalty scored); Thompson (penalty scored); Gape (penalty scored); El-Abd (penalty scored)		Bowditch (penalty scored); Hoskins (penalty missed); Waters (penalty scored); Foley (penalty scored); Taylor (penalty scored); Bridge (penalty scored); Facey (penalty scored); Turnbull (penalty missed)

28 August 2018 Second round	Wycombe Wanderers	2–2 (4–3 p)	Forest Green Rovers	High Wycombe
19:45 BST	Kashket 55'; Stewart 74'; Bean (yellow card) 89'	Report	Grubb 57'; Winchester 86'; Brown (yellow card) 87'	Stadium: Adams Park; Attendance: 1,934; Referee: Antony Coggins
	Penalties
	Jacobson (penalty scored); Freeman (penalty scored); McCarthy (penalty scored); Stewart (penalty scored); Saunders (penalty missed)		Doidge (penalty missed); Gunning (penalty scored); Grubb (penalty scored); Brown (penalty scored); Digby (penalty missed)

25 September 2018 Third round	Wycombe Wanderers	3–4	Norwich City	High Wycombe
19:45 BST	Saunders (yellow card) 15' (goal) 61' (pen.); Cowan-Hall 17'; Gape (yellow card) 45'; Mackail-Smith (yellow card) 45+3'; Akinfenwa 75'	Report	Rhodes 12', 14', 51'; Trybull 41'; Pinto (yellow card) 45'	Stadium: Adams Park; Attendance: 3,947; Referee: Jeremy Simpson

=== EFL Trophy ===
On 13 July 2018, the initial group stage draw bar the U21 invited clubs was announced.

Pos	Lge	Team	Pld	W	PW	PL	L	GF	GA	GD	Pts	Qualification
1	L1	Oxford United (Q)	3	2	0	0	1	7	2	+5	6	Round 2
2	L2	Northampton Town (Q)	3	2	0	0	1	4	2	+2	6	Round 2
3	L1	Wycombe Wanderers (E)	3	2	0	0	1	3	4	−1	6	
4	ACA	Fulham U21 (E)	3	0	0	0	3	1	7	−6	0	

First match(es) will be played: 4 September 2018. Source: EFL.com
(E) Eliminated; (Q) Qualified to the phase indicated

4 September 2018 Group Game 1	Northampton Town	0–1	Wycombe Wanderers	Northampton
19:45 BST	O'Toole (yellow card) 52'; Waters (yellow card) 76'	Report	Kashket 11'; Fox (yellow card) 33'; Ma-Kalambay (yellow card) 72'	Stadium: PTS Academy Stadium; Attendance: 1,053; Referee: Darren Drysdale

18 September 2018 Group Game 2	Wycombe Wanderers	2–1	Fulham U21	High Wycombe
19:45 BST	Samuel 3'; Kashket 90+4'	Report	Thompson 54'	Stadium: Adams Park; Attendance: 595; Referee: Trevor Kettle

6 November 2018 Group Game 3	Wycombe Wanderers	0–3	Oxford United	High Wycombe
19:45 GMT	Fox (yellow card) 52'; Thompson (yellow card) 69'; McCarthy (yellow card) 72'	Report	Brannagan 1'; Browne 31'; Smith 53' (yellow card) 58'	Stadium: Adams Park; Attendance: 1,313; Referee: Kevin Friend

== Team details ==
=== Squad information ===
No.	Nationality	Name	Age	Joined club (Note: Year that player became a Wycombe first-team player. If a player has played more than one spell at Wycombe, the beginning of the most recent spell is used.)
GOALKEEPERS
1	(England)	Ryan Allsop	34	2018
13	(Scotland)	Cameron Yates	27	2018
30	(Democratic Republic of the Congo)	Yves Ma-Kalambay	40	2017
DEFENDERS
2	(Portugal)	Sido Jombati	39	2014
3	(Wales)	Joe Jacobson	39	2014
5	(England)	Anthony Stewart	34	2015
6	(Egypt)	Adam El-Abd (c)	42	2017
16	(Republic of Ireland)	Michael Harriman	33	2015
21	(England)	Darius Charles	38	2018
26	(England)	Jason McCarthy	30	2018
29	(England)	Ben Frempah	31	2019
MIDFIELDERS
4	(England)	Dominic Gape	32	2016
8	(Jamaica)	Marcus Bean	41	2015
10	(England)	Matt Bloomfield	42	2003
15	(Northern Ireland)	Charlie Owens†	28	2019
18	(England)	Curtis Thompson	33	2018
22	(England)	Nick Freeman	30	2016
FORWARDS
11	(England)	Scott Kashket	30	2016
12	(England)	Paris Cowan-Hall	35	2016
17	(England)	Luke Bolton†	26	2019
20	(England)	Adebayo Akinfenwa	44	2016
23	(England)	Nathan Tyson	44	2017
25	(Wales)	Alex Samuel	31	2018

† Loan player

=== Appearances and goals ===
As of 4 May 2019

No.	Pos	Nat	Player	Total		League One		FA Cup		EFL Cup		EFL Trophy	
No.	Pos	Nat	Player	Apps	Goals	Apps	Goals	Apps	Goals	Apps	Goals	Apps	Goals
1	GK	(England) ENG	Ryan Allsop	41	0	38	0	1	0	2	0	0	0
2	DF	(Portugal) POR	Sido Jombati	40	1	33	1	1	0	3	0	3	0
3	DF	(Wales) WAL	Joe Jacobson	40	7	36	7	1	0	2	0	1	0
4	MF	(England) ENG	Dominic Gape	47	1	43	1	1	0	2	0	1	0
5	DF	(England) ENG	Anthony Stewart	19	1	17	0	0	0	1	1	1	0
6	DF	(Egypt) EGY	Adam El-Abd	37	3	34	3	1	0	1	0	1	0
8	MF	(Jamaica) JAM	Marcus Bean	14	1	9	1	1	0	1	0	3	0
9	FW	(Scotland) SCO	Craig Mackail-Smith (Note: Craig Mackail-Smith is currently on loan at Notts County.)	25	3	21	3	1	0	2	0	1	0
10	MF	(England) ENG	Matt Bloomfield	31	2	28	2	0	0	2	0	1	0
11	FW	(England) ENG	Scott Kashket	34	6	27	3	1	0	3	1	3	2
12	FW	(England) ENG	Paris Cowan-Hall	38	5	33	4	1	0	2	1	2	0
13	GK	(Scotland) SCO	Cameron Yates	0	0	0	0	0	0	0	0	0	0
15	MF	(Northern Ireland) NIR	Charlie Owens	2	0	2	0	0	0	0	0	0	0
16	DF	(Republic of Ireland) IRL	Michael Harriman	28	0	24	0	0	0	2	0	2	0
17	FW	(England) ENG	Luke Bolton	10	0	10	0	0	0	0	0	0	0
18	MF	(England) ENG	Curtis Thompson	45	1	39	1	1	0	2	0	3	0
20	FW	(England) ENG	Adebayo Akinfenwa	39	8	36	7	0	0	2	1	1	0
21	DF	(England) ENG	Darius Charles	7	0	5	0	0	0	1	0	1	0
22	MF	(England) ENG	Nick Freeman	33	0	27	0	0	0	3	0	3	0
23	FW	(England) ENG	Nathan Tyson	19	1	19	1	0	0	0	0	0	0
25	FW	(Wales) WAL	Alex Samuel	36	6	30	5	1	0	2	0	3	1
26	DF	(England) ENG	Jason McCarthy	49	2	44	2	1	0	3	0	1	0
29	DF	(England) ENG	Ben Frempah	1	0	1	0	0	0	0	0	0	0
30	GK	(Democratic Republic of the Congo) COD	Yves Ma-Kalambay	7	0	3	0	0	0	1	0	3	0
Players who left the club before the end of the season:
28	GK	(England) ENG	Matt Ingram	1	0	1	0	0	0	0	0	0	0
28	GK	(England) ENG	David Stockdale	2	0	2	0	0	0	0	0	0	0
28	GK	(Republic of Ireland) IRL	Stephen Henderson	3	0	3	0	0	0	0	0	0	0
17	MF	(England) ENG	Bryn Morris	21	3	19	3	0	0	1	0	1	0
19	MF	(Nigeria) NGR	Fred Onyedinma	24	4	21	4	1	0	0	0	2	0
24	FW	(England) ENG	Randell Williams	23	3	20	2	1	0	1	1	1	0
27	DF	(England) ENG	Charlie Fox	2	0	0	0	0	0	0	0	2	0
7	MF	(England) ENG	Sam Saunders	8	1	4	0	0	0	2	1	2	0

== Transfers ==
=== Transfers in ===
Date	Position	Nationality	Name	From	Fee	Ref.
1 July 2018	GK	(England)	Ryan Allsop	AFC Bournemouth	Free transfer	
1 July 2018	CB	(England)	Darius Charles	AFC Wimbledon	Free transfer	
14 July 2018	RM	(England)	Curtis Thompson	Notts County	Free transfer	
9 August 2018	CB	(England)	Jason McCarthy	Barnsley	Undisclosed	
23 August 2018	CF	(Wales)	Alex Samuel	Stevenage	Free transfer	
3 September 2018	GK	(Scotland)	Cameron Yates	Leicester City	Free transfer	
11 March 2019	CB	(England)	Ben Frempah	Guiseley	Free transfer	

=== Transfers out ===
Date	Position	Nationality	Name	To	Fee	Ref.
1 July 2018	GK	(England)	Scott Brown	Port Vale	Released	
1 July 2018	CB	(England)	Will de Havilland	Maidstone United	Released	
1 July 2018	CB	(Germany)	Max Müller	(Germany) FC Astoria Walldorf	Released	
1 July 2018	GK	(England)	Henry Newcombe	Margate	Released	
30 July 2018	CM	(England)	Luke O'Nien	Sunderland	Undisclosed	
30 January 2019	AM	(England)	Sam Saunders	Colchester United	Mutual consent	

=== Loans in ===
Start date	Position	Nationality	Name	From	End date	Ref.
27 July 2018	LW	(England)	Randell Williams	Watford	1 January 2019	
7 August 2018	DM	(England)	Bryn Morris	Shrewsbury Town	1 January 2019	
30 August 2018	LB	(England)	Charlie Fox	Queens Park Rangers	1 January 2019	
30 August 2018	RM	(Nigeria)	Fred Onyedinma	Millwall	1 January 2019	
15 November 2018	GK	(England)	Matt Ingram	Queens Park Rangers	22 November 2018	
22 November 2018	GK	(England)	David Stockdale	Birmingham City	29 November 2018	
4 December 2018	GK	(Republic of Ireland)	Stephen Henderson	Nottingham Forest	25 December 2018	(Note: On 12 December, Stephen Henderson's emergency loan spell was extended by another seven days.) (Note: On 20 December, Stephen Henderson's loan was extended further.)
24 January 2019	RW	(England)	Luke Bolton	Manchester City	End of season	
31 January 2019	DM	(Northern Ireland)	Charlie Owens	Queens Park Rangers	End of season	

=== Loans out ===
Start date	Position	Nationality	Name	To	End date	Ref.
16 October 2018	GK	(Scotland)	Cameron Yates	Aylesbury United	November 2018	
30 January 2019	CF	(Scotland)	Craig Mackail-Smith	Notts County	31 May 2019	
