= Cameron Yates =

Scottish footballer

Personal information
- Full name: Cameron James Yates
- Date of birth: 14 February 1999 (age 27)
- Place of birth: Edinburgh, Scotland
- Height: 6 ft 2 in (1.88 m)
- Position: Goalkeeper

Youth career
- Leicester City

Senior career*
| Years | Team | Apps | (Gls) |
| 2018–2021 | Wycombe Wanderers | 0 | (0) |
| 2018 | → Aylesbury United (loan) | 3 | (0) |
| 2021 | Dundalk | 1 | (0) |
- * Club domestic league appearances and goals as of 12:35, 15 December 2021 (UTC)

Cameron James Yates (born 14 February 1999) is a Scottish footballer who plays as a goalkeeper for League of Ireland Premier Division club Dundalk.

== Career ==
=== Leicester City ===
Yates signed for the academy of Leicester City aged 9 years old (2008-2018) playing alongside the likes of Ben Chilwell, Harvey Barnes, Hamza Choudhury Kiernan Dewsbury-Hall and Luke Thomas but was unable to follow them into the first team squad. As a scholar, he captained the U18s team to the QF of the FA Yth cup losing narrowly to eventual winners Chelsea. He won the 2017 PL Save of the season for his spectacular stop against Middlesbrough in the FA Yth Cup.

He represented Scotland at U15/16 level winning caps against Ireland, Poland and Holland and featured in the 2015 Victory shield squad.

=== Wycombe Wanderers ===
On 3 September 2018, Yates joined Wycombe Wanderers. Despite not playing a professional game for Wycombe, on 27 September 2019, his contract was extended until June 2021.

==== Aylesbury United (loan) ====
On 16 October 2018, Yates moved on loan to Aylesbury United. He made his Aylesbury United debut on the same day against Bedford Town. His final match for Aylesbury United came against Sutton Coldfield Town on 3 November 2018, in which he was replaced at half-time due to an injury. He made three league appearances for the club.

=== Return to Wycombe ===
He made his professional debut in Wycombe's EFL Trophy game against Stevenage on 8 October 2019.

On 12 May 2021 it was announced that he would leave Wycombe at the end of the season.

=== Dundalk ===
Having been released by Wycombe Wanderers in June 2021, Yates signed for League of Ireland Premier Division club Dundalk on 17 August 2021.

== Career statistics ==
As of 15 December 2021

Appearances and goals by club, season and competition
| Club | Season | League | | | National Cup (Note: Includes FA Cup & FAI Cup) | | League Cup (Note: Includes EFL Cup & League of Ireland Cup) | | Other | | Total | |
| Club | Season | Division | Apps | Goals | Apps | Goals | Apps | Goals | Apps | Goals | Apps | Goals |
|---|---|---|---|---|---|---|---|---|---|---|---|---|
| Wycombe Wanderers | 2018–19 | EFL League One | 0 | 0 | 0 | 0 | 0 | 0 | 0 | 0 | 0 | 0 |
| Aylesbury United (loan) | 2018–19 | Southern Division One Central | 3 | 0 | 0 | 0 | — | | — | | 3 | 0 |
| Wycombe Wanderers | 2019–20 | EFL League One | 0 | 0 | 0 | 0 | 0 | 0 | 3 (Note: Appearances in the EFL Trophy) | 0 | 3 | 0 |
| Wycombe Wanderers | 2020–21 | EFL Championship | 0 | 0 | 0 | 0 | 0 | 0 | — | | 0 | 0 |
| Wycombe Wanderers | Total | | 0 | 0 | 0 | 0 | 0 | 0 | 3 | 0 | 3 | 0 |
| Dundalk | 2021 | League of Ireland Premier Division | 1 | 0 | 1 | 0 | — | | — | | 2 | 0 |
| Career total | | | 4 | 0 | 1 | 0 | 0 | 0 | 3 | 0 | 8 | 0 |
