= Uche Ikpeazu =

Ugandan footballer (born 1995)

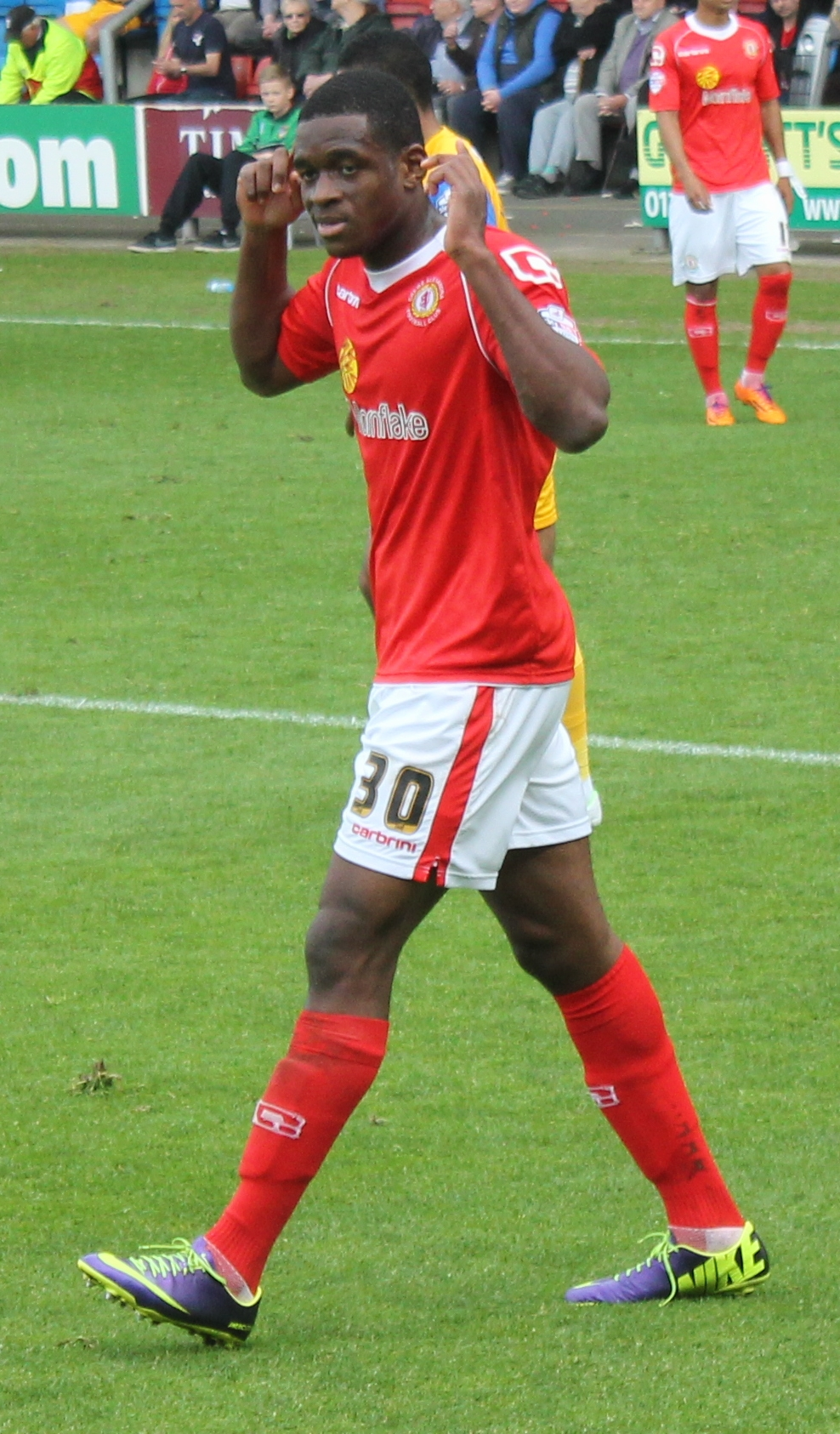
- Ikpeazu playing for Crewe Alexandra in 2014

Personal information
- Full name: Karl Anthony Uchechukwu Mubiru Ikpeazu
- Date of birth: 28 February 1995 (age 31)
- Place of birth: Harrow, England
- Height: 6 ft 3 in (1.91 m)
- Position: Forward

Youth career
- 2010–2011: Reading

Senior career*
Years	Team	Apps	(Gls)
2011–2013	Reading	0	(0)
2011–2012	→ Didcot Town (loan)	2	(1)
2013–2016	Watford	0	(0)
2014	→ Crewe Alexandra (loan)	15	(4)
2014–2015	→ Crewe Alexandra (loan)	8	(2)
2015	→ Doncaster Rovers (loan)	7	(0)
2015	→ Crewe Alexandra (loan)	9	(0)
2015	→ Port Vale (loan)	21	(5)
2016	→ Blackpool (loan)	12	(0)
2016–2018	Cambridge United	69	(19)
2018–2020	Heart of Midlothian	40	(5)
2020–2021	Wycombe Wanderers	31	(6)
2021–2022	Middlesbrough	20	(2)
2022	→ Cardiff City (loan)	13	(3)
2022–2023	Konyaspor	15	(0)
2023–2024	Port Vale	20	(1)
2024–2026	St Johnstone	18	(1)
2026	Ross County	9	(2)

International career^{‡}
2025–	Uganda	6	(2)
- * Club domestic league appearances and goals as of 21:44, 4 May 2026 (UTC) ‡ National team caps and goals as of 12:09, 28 December 2025 (UTC)

Karl Anthony Uchechukwu Mubiru Ikpeazu (born 28 February 1995) is a professional footballer who plays as a forward. Born in England, he plays for the Uganda national team.

A former Reading Academy player, he joined Watford in 2013. He spent three years with the club without making a first-team appearance. Instead, he played on loan at Crewe Alexandra, Doncaster Rovers, Port Vale, and Blackpool. He signed with Cambridge United in August 2016 and spent two seasons with the club before signing with Heart of Midlothian in April 2018. He played for Hearts as they lost the 2019 Scottish Cup final. He returned to England to sign with Wycombe Wanderers in August 2020 and was then sold to Middlesbrough 11 months later. He joined Cardiff City on loan in January 2022. He joined Turkish club Konyaspor in August 2022. In October 2023, he signed a contract with Port Vale to run until the end of the 2023–24 season. He returned to Scotland with St Johnstone in May 2024. He joined Ross County for a brief spell in February 2026.

== Club career ==
=== Reading and Watford ===
Ikpeazu was born in Harrow, London to an Igbo Nigerian father and a Ugandan mother. Ikpeazu joined Reading's academy in late 2010. He signed for Southern League Division One South & West club Didcot Town on loan in November 2011 and scored twice in three games, including the 3–1 FA Trophy win against Conference Premier team Bromley. In the 2012–13 season, his final for the under-18s, he scored 28 goals in as many games, finishing as the top scorer in the country at academy level.

Reading offered him a professional contract. However, he turned it down and instead signed a three-year contract with fellow Championship club Watford in July 2013. Due to his age, Watford were required to pay compensation which, after six months of negotiations, was agreed in January 2014 with the fee remaining undisclosed. The same month, having yet to make his first-team debut for Watford, Ikpeazu joined League One club Crewe Alexandra on loan until the end of the season. He made his debut at Gresty Road as a second-half substitute in a 2–1 defeat to Leyton Orient on 18 January, and scored his first goals in professional football with two goals against Bradford City three weeks later.

Ikpeazu returned to Crewe on 26 November 2014, on a loan deal until 25 January 2015. Two days later he scored in a 1–1 home draw with Doncaster Rovers. After the loan deal ended he joined Doncaster Rovers on loan. He was reported to have been viewed as a possible permanent signing by manager Paul Dickov, but returned to Watford in March after failing to impress at the Keepmoat Stadium. He then returned to Crewe on loan after manager Steve Davis admitted that he was unable to replace Ikpeazu during his absence.

Ikpeazu joined League One club Port Vale on a six-month loan in July 2015, having impressed manager Rob Page playing against the Vale for Crewe the previous season. He started the campaign as the club's main striker. Though he dropped out of the first XI against Oldham Athletic on 29 September, he came off the bench to score an equalising goal. Page was hopeful of extending the loan deal until the end of the season, as Ikpeazu was the club's top-scorer throughout the early stages of the campaign. However, he lost his first-team place after being sent off against Burton Albion on 24 October as A-Jay Leitch-Smith entered the team and found a rich vein of form. Despite Ikpeazu still being the club's top-scorer his loan spell was not extended in January. He remained in League One however, as he joined Blackpool on loan until the end of the 2015–16 season. Ikpeazu was then released by Watford upon the expiry of his contract.

=== Cambridge United ===
Ikpeazu had a trial at Championship club Norwich City in July 2016 and scored in a pre-season friendly against Dereham Town. He signed a short-term contract with League Two club Cambridge United the following month. He scored his first goal for Cambridge in a 2–1 win over Newport County at Rodney Parade on 24 September, and manager Shaun Derry said he was becoming a "cult figure" at the club. On 9 January 2017, Ikpeazu scored for Cambridge in a 2–1 FA Cup third round defeat to Championship team Leeds United. On 23 February, he was ruled out of action for eight weeks with a hamstring injury. He ended the 2016–17 campaign with eight goals in 36 appearances and underwent surgery after dislocating his shoulder at Portsmouth on 22 April.

On 9 December 2017, Ikpeazu was sent off in a 2–0 loss at former club Port Vale after receiving two yellow cards in two minutes. In April 2018, "U's" announced that they "had tabled a series of strong and competitive packages at League Two level. However, the club can confirm that Ikpeazu has declined the offers put forward, making his desire to play at a higher level clear in each conversation.

=== Heart of Midlothian ===
Ikpeazu signed a pre-contract agreement with Scottish Premiership club Heart of Midlothian in April 2018, with a two-year contract which took effect from 1 July 2018. He said he was attracted to the club by the size of Tynecastle Park and faith shown in him by manager Craig Levein. He signed an extended contract with the club in March 2019 after stating that "I feel the love" following the club's support during a four-month injury lay-off with a broken foot. Old Firm clubs Celtic and Rangers were reported to have expressed an interest in bidding for his services. Hearts reached the 2019 Scottish Cup final at Hampden Park, where they lost 2–1 to Celtic, with Ikpeazu replacing Steven MacLean on 78 minutes.

He lost his first-team place under Daniel Stendel by the time the 2019–20 season was halted due to the COVID-19 pandemic in Scotland. He was expected to be sold or released in the summer transfer window after club chair Ann Budge asked the playing staff to take a temporary 50% pay cut due to the pandemic.

=== Wycombe Wanderers ===
On 17 August 2020, Ikpeazu signed a three-year deal for newly-promoted Championship club Wycombe Wanderers. Manager Gareth Ainsworth said that "we feel he's perfectly suited for the way we play" and saw him as a long-term replacement for Adebayo Akinfenwa. He scored his first goal for the "Chairboys" in 3–1 defeat by Middlesbrough at Adams Park on 2 January, as he "curled in a beautiful effort from 20 yards (18 m)" for his first goal since September 2019. He recovered from an injury later in the year and went on to score six goals in 33 appearances during the 2020–21 season, including the winning goal against Bournemouth on 1 May which took Wycombe's relegation fight to the last day of the campaign. They were relegated despite beating Middlesbrough on the final day. Ikpeazu came second in the Supporters' Player of the Year vote, and his goals against Brentford and Bournemouth came second and third respectively in the goal of the season vote.

=== Middlesbrough ===
On 2 July 2021, Ikpeazu returned to the Championship to sign for Middlesbrough for an undisclosed fee, signing a three-year contract. Manager Neil Warnock said that he had tracked the players since his time at Hearts. He scored three goals in 22 games, but was not in new manager Chris Wilder's first-team plans after he signed Aaron Connolly and Folarin Balogun on loan during the January transfer window to compliment in-form forwards Josh Coburn and Duncan Watmore.

=== Cardiff City ===
On 31 January 2022, Ikpeazu joined Championship club Cardiff City on loan until the end of the 2021–22 season. Steve Morison, manager of the Bluebirds, had needed a quick replacement after Kieffer Moore forced through a late move to AFC Bournemouth. Middlesbrough had wanted to offload Ikpeazu on a permanent transfer but relented with Cardiff's request for it to be a loan signing. On 2 February, he came on as a substitute against Barnsley to make his Cardiff debut. He scored the winning goal in a 1–0 victory. Despite only starting one game for the Bluebirds, he made a further twelve appearances from the bench and scored a total of three goals and was a popular figure with supporters at the Cardiff City Stadium.

=== Konyaspor ===
On 13 August 2022, Ikpeazu signed with Turkish Süper Lig side Konyaspor on a free transfer with a sell-on clause. He was sent off after receiving two yellow cards during a 2–2 draw at Trabzonspor on 6 November. His contract with Konyaspor was terminated in early September 2023. Ikpeazu was reported to be close to a return to Wycombe Wanderers, but the deal failed to materialize.

=== Port Vale ===
On 4 October 2023, Ikpeazu signed a contract with Port Vale to run until the end of the 2023–24 season. Director of football, David Flitcroft, stated that "Uche is a powerhouse of a player and provides us with another dimension that combines and compliments our other attacking options and we have brought him in at this stage of the season to provide further competition for places". He was short of match fitness on his arrival. Hence, manager Andy Crosby began steadily giving him more game minutes as the weeks progressed. He played a full 90 minutes for the first time on 14 November, and was described by opposition manager Dino Maamria as "unplayable" in a 2–0 win at Burton Albion. He scored his first goal in his second spell for the club on 6 January, in a 3–3 draw with Charlton Athletic, and was named on the EFL team of the week having made six shots, won five aerial duels and completed four dribbles during the game. Charlton had a transfer bid accepted for the player later in the month but the move never materialised. Instead the player picked up a dislocated shoulder and was ruled out of action until mid-April. He did, though, return to fitness two weeks ahead of schedule. He scored one goal from 26 games as the club was relegated and he then entered negotiations for a new contract.

=== St Johnstone ===
On 30 May 2024, Ikpeazu agreed to a two-year contract with Scottish Premiership club St Johnstone, who were managed by his former boss at Hearts, Craig Levein. Ikpeazu suffered an accident at home just before the start of pre-season, however, and the resulting "freak injury" left him requiring knee surgery and ruled him out of action until April 2025 when he was named as a substitute for the Scottish Cup semi-final against Celtic at Hampden. It was a meniscus tear in his knee that appeared due to wear and tear. The ongoing injury saga required five operations, meaning that he barely featured under new manager Simo Valakari. He returned to action at the end of the 2024–25 campaign to help in the club's fight against relegation, stating that he was ready for the challenge and that "pressure is a privilege" as he made his club debut in April. St Johnstone were relegated with one game to spare.

=== Ross County ===
On 2 February 2026, Ikpeazu signed with Ross County as manager Stuart Kettlewell wanted to add a physical presence to his forward line. In doing so, Ikpeazu moved from the top club in the Scottish Championship to the division's bottom club. He scored on his debut at Victoria Park the following day to secure a victory over Queen's Park that lifted County off the bottom of the table. He scored two goals in his first four games for the club, though did not score in his remaining five appearances of the 2025–26 season, which ended in relegation. Ikpeazu was one of six players that were released in the summer.

== International career ==
Ikpeazu was called up to the Uganda squad by head coach Johnathan McKinstry for two 2021 Africa Cup of Nations qualification matches in March 2020, but the games were postponed due to the COVID-19 pandemic in Uganda. McKinstry's successor, Milutin Sredojević, attempted to call him up in April 2022 but Ikpeazu wanted to stay in Wales and try and fight for his place in the Cardiff City team. He was called up again in May 2024 and September 2025. Ikpeazu made his full international debut on 5 September 2025, appearing as a substitute in a 4–0 win against Mozambique.

He was named on the 2025 Africa Cup of Nations squadlist. He scored the equalising goal in a 1–1 draw with Tanzania, which gave Uganda hope of qualification out of the group with victory over Nigeria in their final match. However, Uganda lost to Nigeria and finished bottom of the group.

== Style of play ==
Ikpeazu is an athletic 6 ft 3 in (1.91 m) forward who possesses pace and power but sometimes struggles with ball control. He has said that "my strength is my strength and I have to use that but I have other aspects to my game".

== Career statistics ==
=== Club ===
As of match played 4 April 2026

Appearances and goals by club, season and competition
Club	Season	League			National cup (Note: Includes FA Cup, Scottish Cup, Turkish Cup)		League cup (Note: Includes Football League Cup, Scottish League Cup)		Other		Total	
Club	Season	Division	Apps	Goals	Apps	Goals	Apps	Goals	Apps	Goals	Apps	Goals
Reading	2011–12	Championship	0	0	0	0	0	0	—		0	0
Reading	2012–13	Premier League	0	0	0	0	0	0	—		0	0
Reading	Total		0	0	0	0	0	0	0	0	0	0
Didcot Town (loan)	2011–12	Southern League; Division One South & West	2	1	0	0	—		1 (Note: Appearance in FA Trophy)	1	3	2
Watford	2013–14	Championship	0	0	0	0	0	0	—		0	0
Watford	2014–15	Championship	0	0	0	0	0	0	—		0	0
Watford	2015–16	Premier League	0	0	0	0	0	0	—		0	0
Watford	Total		0	0	0	0	0	0	0	0	0	0
Crewe Alexandra (loan)	2013–14	League One	15	4	—		—		—		15	4
Crewe Alexandra (loan)	2014–15	League One	17	2	—		—		—		17	2
Doncaster Rovers (loan)	2014–15	League One	7	0	—		—		—		7	0
Port Vale (loan)	2015–16	League One	21	5	3	0	2	0	2 (Note: Appearances in Football League Trophy)	1	28	6
Blackpool (loan)	2015–16	League One	12	0	—		—		—		12	0
Cambridge United	2016–17	League Two	29	6	4	1	—		3 (Note: Appearances in EFL Trophy)	1	36	8
Cambridge United	2017–18	League Two	40	13	2	0	1	1	1 (Note: Appearances in EFL Trophy)	0	44	14
Cambridge United	Total		69	19	6	1	1	1	4	1	80	22
Heart of Midlothian	2018–19	Scottish Premiership	17	3	5	2	4	3	0	0	26	8
Heart of Midlothian	2019–20	Scottish Premiership	23	2	0	0	6	0	0	0	29	2
Heart of Midlothian	Total		40	5	5	2	10	3	0	0	55	10
Wycombe Wanderers	2020–21	Championship	31	6	2	0	0	0	—		33	6
Middlesbrough	2021–22	Championship	20	2	1	1	1	0	—		22	3
Middlesbrough	2022–23	Championship	0	0	0	0	0	0	—		0	0
Middlesbrough	Total		20	2	1	1	1	0	0	0	22	3
Cardiff City (loan)	2021–22	Championship	13	3	0	0	—		—		13	3
Konyaspor	2022–23	Süper Lig	15	0	2	0	—		—		17	0
Konyaspor	2023–24	Süper Lig	0	0	0	0	—		—		0	0
Konyaspor	Total		15	0	2	0	0	0	0	0	17	0
Port Vale	2023–24	League One	20	1	3	0	2	0	1 (Note: Appearances in EFL Trophy)	0	26	1
St Johnstone	2024–25	Scottish Premiership	4	0	1	0	—		—		5	0
St Johnstone	2025–26	Scottish Championship	14	1	1	1	4	2	1 (Note: Appearances in Scottish Challenge Cup)	0	20	4
St Johnstone	Total		18	1	2	1	4	2	1	0	25	4
Ross County	2025–26	Scottish Championship	9	2	—		—		—		9	2
Career total			309	51	24	5	20	6	9	3	362	65

=== International ===
As of match played 27 December 2025

Appearances and goals by national team and year
National team	Year	Apps	Goals
Uganda	2025	6	2
Total		6	2

As of match played 27 December 2025
Scores and results list Uganda's goal tally first, score column indicates score after each Ikpeazu goal.

List of international goals scored by Uche Ikpeazu
No.	Date	Venue	Opponent	Score	Result	Competition
1	14 November 2025	Berrechid Municipal Stadium, Berrechid, Morocco	Chad	1–0	2–1	Friendly
2	27 December 2025	Fez Stadium, Fez, Morocco	Tanzania	1–1	1–1	2025 Africa Cup of Nations

== Honours ==
Heart of Midlothian

- Scottish Cup runner-up: 2018–19
