= Curtis Anderson (footballer) =

English footballer World Cup winner (born 2000)

Personal information
- Full name: Curtis Rainford Anderson
- Date of birth: 27 September 2000 (age 26)
- Place of birth: Barrow, England
- Height: 1.82 m (6 ft 0 in)
- Position: Goalkeeper

Youth career
- 2009–2012: Blackpool
- 2012–2019: Manchester City

Senior career*
Years	Team	Apps	(Gls)
2019	Charlotte Independence	10	(0)
2020–2022	Wycombe Wanderers	0	(0)
2020	→ Walton Casuals (loan)	1	(0)
2021	→ Eastbourne Borough (loan)	5	(0)
2022–2023	Lancaster City	18	(0)
2023	Bootle	6	(0)
2023	Kendal Town	1	(0)

International career^{‡}
2015–2016	England U16	3	(0)
2016–2017	England U17	12	(0)
2017	England U18	1	(0)
2018	England U19	3	(0)
Medal record
Men's football
Representing England
FIFA U-17 World Cup
Winner	2017 India
UEFA European Under-17 Championship
Runner-up	2017 Croatia
- * Club domestic league appearances and goals as of 10:40, 18 April 2023 (UTC) ‡ National team caps and goals as of 16 April 2019

Curtis Rainford Anderson (born 27 September 2000) is an English former footballer. He played as a goalkeeper and was a member of the England team which won the 2017 FIFA U-17 World Cup.

== Club career ==
In 2012, at 11-years old, Anderson moved from Blackpool to Manchester City for a fee of £15,000. Anderson played with Manchester City's youth and academy sides until moving to second-tier North American side Charlotte Independence in March 2019.

Anderson and Charlotte Independence mutually agreed to terminate his contract on 29 August 2019.

=== Wycombe Wanderers ===
On 2 September 2020, he signed for Championship club Wycombe Wanderers on a one-year deal. In May 2021, it was confirmed that his contract had been extended by a further year.

==== Walton Casuals (loan) ====
On 27 October 2020, Anderson joined Southern League Premier Division South side Walton Casuals on loan. However, the club's season was halted shortly after his arrival, before ultimately their season was outright cancelled on 24 February 2021.

==== Eastbourne Borough (loan) ====
On 9 July 2021, Anderson signed for National League South side Eastbourne Borough on loan for the entire of the 2021–22 season.

=== Lancaster City ===
On 31 January 2022, Anderson signed for Lancaster City after his release from Wycombe Wanderers. He made 21 appearances for the club in all competitions before departing.

=== Bootle ===
On 18 March 2023, Anderson joined Northern Premier League Division One West side Bootle on a free transfer.

== International career ==
Anderson was a squad member for the England under-17 team that finished runners up at the 2017 UEFA European Under-17 Championship. In October 2017, Anderson was included in the squad for the 2017 FIFA U-17 World Cup. He saved a penalty and then converted his own as England defeated Japan in a penalty shoot-out to reach the quarter-finals. Anderson played in the final as England defeated Spain to lift the trophy.

== Honours ==
=== National ===
England U17

- FIFA U-17 World Cup: 2017
- UEFA European Under-17 Championship runner-up: 2017

== Retirement and post-football life ==
Anderson retired from football in 2023 to pursue a career as a financial advisor.
