= 2014–15 Wolverhampton Wanderers F.C. season =

English football club season

Wolverhampton Wanderers
2014–15 season
- Chairman: Steve Morgan
- Head coach: Kenny Jackett
- Championship: 7th
- FA Cup: 3rd round
- League Cup: 1st round
- Top goalscorer: League: Bakary Sako (15); All: Nouha Dicko & Bakary Sako (15)
- Highest home attendance: 28,132 (vs Blackpool, 17 January 2015)
- Lowest home attendance: 6,171 (vs Northampton, 12 August 2014)
- Average home league attendance: 22,419
Home colours	Away colours

The 2014–15 season was the 116th season of competitive league football in the history of English football club Wolverhampton Wanderers. The club competed in the second tier of the English football system, the Football League Championship, following their return to the second level after being promoted as champions from League One at the first attempt.

The club finished the season in seventh position, missing out on a play-off place on goal difference. Their tally of 78 points represented the highest points tally not to earn a play-off place since the system was introduced.

== Season review ==
Following their record-breaking promotion from League One, pre-season training began on 26 June with Wolves having already made two of their three summer signings with Tommy Rowe and Rajiv van La Parra arriving on free transfers; Chelsea academy graduate George Saville would join for a fee in late August but fail to make any impact before being loaned out. The transfer window saw deals reached to remove some of the club's transfer listed players from the wage bill with Tongo Doumbia, Jamie O’Hara and Stephen Ward all moving on.

The season began with a 1–0 win over newly relegated Norwich, which was soon followed by two further 1–0 wins against the other two teams to have fallen out of the Premier League, Fulham and Cardiff, respectively. The team lost just twice in their opening 15 league fixtures, bringing them a place in the top 4 of the division. However, a lengthy hamstring injury to striker Nouha Dicko left the team lacking attacking options, with Leon Clarke having scored just once. The loan acquisition of Hull striker Yannick Sagbo failed to solve the issue as the player's lack of fitness became apparent and the deal was cut short. A second Premier League striker was loaned in with Sunderland's Danny Graham then having a six-week stay but providing only one goal. During this time Wolves suffered five defeats in a row, their worst run at Championship level since 1991, dropping them into mid-table.

With Dicko regaining fitness by the Christmas period, the team went two months undefeated and bolstered their attacking threat by signing Benik Afobe from Arsenal, who had led the goalscoring charts while on loan at League One side MK Dons. The January window saw the departures of two further transfer listed players, Roger Johnson and Kevin Foley. The following months saw the team regain a footing in the promotion race, as they became one of the eight clubs at the top of the division to break clear of the remaining teams.

After sitting in 8th place for several weeks, a run of four consecutive victories in late March/early April allowed them to finally break back into the play-off positions. However, they immediately suffered two consecutive losses - at local rivals Birmingham and promotion contenders Middlesbrough - that dropped them again down to 8th. After a home match against fellow play-off challenger Ipswich, managed by former Wolves manager Mick McCarthy, finished 1–1, Wolves were left needing to hope that teams above them would drop sufficient points in the final two rounds of games to allow them back into the top 6. Although Wolves won their final two games to catch Ipswich on points, their goal difference proved insufficient to overtake either the East Anglian club or Brentford, who had been promoted as runners-up behind Wolves in the previous season. Wolves' tally of 78 points was the highest-achieved to date by a team that did not qualify for the play-offs since their introduction.

== Results ==
=== Preseason ===
11 July 2014	Cheltenham Town	1–3	Wolverhampton Wanderers	Cheltenham
19:45 BST	Richards 60'	Report	Sako 35' (pen.); Edwards 37'; Clarke 49'	Stadium: Abbey Business Stadium; Attendance: 1,705; Referee: Oliver Langford

14 July 2014	Shamrock Rovers	1–4	Wolverhampton Wanderers	Dublin, Ireland
20:00 BST	Millar 9'	Report	Clarke 24'; McAlinden 28'; Dicko 69'; Sako 90' (pen.)	Stadium: Tallaght Stadium; Attendance: 1,000 (est.); Referee: Derek Tomney

16 July 2014	Bohemians	1–3	Wolverhampton Wanderers	Dublin, Ireland
19:45 BST	Corcoran 83'	Report	Clarke 6', 29'; Dicko 59'	Stadium: Dalymount Park; Attendance: 1,672; Referee: Paul Tuite

22 July 2014	Peterborough United	2–2	Wolverhampton Wanderers	Peterborough
19:45 BST	Vassell 15'; McCann 54' (pen.)	Report	Clarke 24'; Edwards 78'	Stadium: London Road; Attendance: 1,956; Referee: Stephen Martin

26 July 2014	Crewe Alexandra	0–1	Wolverhampton Wanderers	Crewe
15:00 BST		Report	Dicko 89'	Stadium: Alexandra Stadium; Attendance: 2,721; Referee: Mark Heywood

29 July 2014	Oxford United	0–1	Wolverhampton Wanderers	Oxford
19:45 BST		Report	Clarke 27'	Stadium: Kassam Stadium; Attendance: 2,727; Referee: John Busby

2 August 2014	Wolverhampton Wanderers	1–1	Celta Vigo	Wolverhampton
15:00 BST	Dicko 32'	Report	Larrivey 65'	Stadium: Molineux; Attendance: 5,253; Referee: Stephen Martin

=== Championship ===
A total of 24 teams competed in the Football League Championship in the 2014–15 season. Each team played every other team twice, once at their stadium, and once at the opposition's. Three points were awarded to teams for each win, one point per draw, and none for defeats.

The provisional fixture list was released on 18 June 2014, but was subject to change in the event of matches being selected for television coverage or police concerns.

Matches

10 August 2014 1	Wolverhampton Wanderers	1–0	Norwich City	Wolverhampton
16:00 BST	Edwards 64'	Report		Stadium: Molineux; Attendance: 22,053 (1,543 away fans); Referee: Simon Hooper

16 August 2014 2	Rotherham United	1–0	Wolverhampton Wanderers	Rotherham
15:00 BST	Hall 76'	Report		Stadium: New York Stadium; Attendance: 10,752 (1,650 away fans); Referee: Graham Salisbury

20 August 2014 3	Fulham	0–1	Wolverhampton Wanderers	London
20:00 BST		Report	Sako 15' (penalty missed) 90+4'	Stadium: Craven Cottage; Attendance: 18,627 (2,224 away fans); Referee: James Linington

23 August 2014 4	Wolverhampton Wanderers	1–0	Cardiff City	Wolverhampton
15:00 BST	Hudson 90+1' (o.g.)	Report		Stadium: Molineux; Attendance: 21,221 (1,856 away fans); Referee: Darren Drysdale

30 August 2014 5	Wolverhampton Wanderers	3–1	Blackburn Rovers	Wolverhampton
15:00 BST	Dicko 13'; Sako 33', 68'	Report	Rhodes 59' (pen.)	Stadium: Molineux; Attendance: 21,260 (1,027 away fans); Referee: Keith Stroud

13 September 2014 6	Blackpool	0–0	Wolverhampton Wanderers	Blackpool
15:00 BST		Report		Stadium: Bloomfield Road; Attendance: 12,233 (2,200 away fans); Referee: Mick Russell

16 September 2014 7	Charlton Athletic	1–1	Wolverhampton Wanderers	London
19:45 BST	Bikey 25'	Report	Batth 65'	Stadium: The Valley; Attendance: 15,973 (1,644 away fans); Referee: Pat Miller

20 September 2014 8	Wolverhampton Wanderers	1–0	Bolton Wanderers	Wolverhampton
15:00 BST	Dicko 42'	Report	Garvan (penalty missed) 58'	Stadium: Molineux; Attendance: 22,695 (811 away fans); Referee: Andy Madley

28 September 2014 9	Reading	3–3	Wolverhampton Wanderers	Reading
13:15 BST	Hector 19'; Taylor 54'; Murray 89'	Report	Henry 51'; Evans 54'; Blackman 84' (o.g.)	Stadium: Madejski Stadium; Attendance: 17,454 (1,784 away fans); Referee: James Adcock

1 October 2014 10	Wolverhampton Wanderers	1–3	Huddersfield Town	Wolverhampton
19:45 BST	Sako 71'	Report	Bunn 21'; Scannell 39'; Coady 51'	Stadium: Molineux; Attendance: 19,059 (532 away fans); Referee: Phil Gibbs

4 October 2014 11	Wolverhampton Wanderers	2–2	Wigan Athletic	Wolverhampton
15:00 BST	Edwards 30'; Sako 64'	Report	Perch 32'; Fortuné 45+2'	Stadium: Molineux; Attendance: 21,288 (903 away fans); Referee: Andy Davies

18 October 2014 12	Millwall	3–3	Wolverhampton Wanderers	London
15:00 BST	Gregory 67'; Fuller 82', 87'	Report	Batth 23'; Ebanks-Landell 61'; Sako 64'	Stadium: The Den; Attendance: 13,428 (2,102 away fans); Referee: Darren Drysdale

21 October 2014 13	Wolverhampton Wanderers	2–0	Middlesbrough	Wolverhampton
19:45 BST	Sako 33' (pen.); Dicko 73'	Report		Stadium: Molineux; Attendance: 18,391 (723 away fans); Referee: Carl Berry

25 October 2014 14	Leeds United	1–2	Wolverhampton Wanderers	Leeds
15:00 BST	Antenucci 18'	Report	Henry 66'; Clarke 85'	Stadium: Elland Road; Attendance: 27,883 (2,074 away fans); Referee: David Webb

1 November 2014 15	Wolverhampton Wanderers	0–0	Birmingham City	Wolverhampton
12:15 GMT		Report		Stadium: Molineux; Attendance: 25,135 (2,551 away fans); Referee: Anthony Taylor

4 November 2014 16	Ipswich Town	2–1	Wolverhampton Wanderers	Ipswich
19:45 GMT	Murphy 35', 59'	Report	Henry 53'	Stadium: Portman Road; Attendance: 17,267 (948 away fans); Referee: Andy Madley

8 November 2014 17	Derby County	5–0	Wolverhampton Wanderers	Derby
12:15 GMT	Shotton 15'; Hendrick 28', 55'; Russell 42', 61'	Report		Stadium: iPro Stadium; Attendance: 30,398 (2,565 away fans); Referee: Graham Salisbury

22 November 2014 18	Wolverhampton Wanderers	0–3	Nottingham Forest	Wolverhampton
15:00 GMT		Report	Assombalonga 65'; Fryatt 68'; Lansbury 83'	Stadium: Molineux; Attendance: 25,513 (2,570 away fans); Referee: Paul Tierney

29 November 2014 19	Brentford	4–0	Wolverhampton Wanderers	London
15:00 GMT	Judge 29'; Dallas 74'; Gray 82'; Jota 90+4'	Report		Stadium: Griffin Park; Attendance: 10,923 (1,603 away fans); Referee: Mark Brown

6 December 2014 20	Wolverhampton Wanderers	1–2	Bournemouth	Wolverhampton
15:00 GMT	Graham 41'	Report	Arter 73'; Ritchie 85'	Stadium: Molineux; Attendance: 20,196 (1,976 away fans); Referee: Mike Jones

13 December 2014 21	Sheffield Wednesday	0–1	Wolverhampton Wanderers	Sheffield
15:00 GMT		Report	Clarke 84'	Stadium: Hillsborough; Attendance: 20,598 (2,166 away fans); Referee: Stuart Attwell

20 December 2014 22	Wolverhampton Wanderers	1–1	Brighton & Hove Albion	Wolverhampton
15:00 GMT	Batth 88'	Report	Bent 10'	Stadium: Molineux; Attendance: 22,882 (887 away fans); Referee: Darren Bond

26 December 2014 23	Watford	0–1	Wolverhampton Wanderers	Watford
17:30 GMT		Report	Dicko 57'	Stadium: Vicarage Road; Attendance: 17,443 (985 away fans); Referee: Graham Scott

28 December 2014 24	Wolverhampton Wanderers	2–1	Brentford	Wolverhampton
15:00 GMT	Dicko 7'; Tarkowski 73' (o.g.)	Report	Batth 87' (o.g.)	Stadium: Molineux; Attendance: 23,598 (1,036 away fans); Referee: Kevin Wright

11 January 2015 25	Blackburn Rovers	0–1	Wolverhampton Wanderers	Blackburn
14:00 GMT		Report	Edwards 48'	Stadium: Ewood Park; Attendance: 15,355 (1,498 away fans); Referee: Mark Haywood

17 January 2015 26	Wolverhampton Wanderers	2–0	Blackpool	Wolverhampton
15:00 GMT	Edwards 86'; Afobe 90'	Report		Stadium: Molineux; Attendance: 28,132 (613 away fans); Referee: Kevin Johnson

24 January 2015 27	Wolverhampton Wanderers	0–0	Charlton Athletic	Wolverhampton
15:00 GMT		Report		Stadium: Molineux; Attendance: 23,487 (487 away fans); Referee: Andy D'Urso

31 January 2015 28	Bolton Wanderers	2–2	Wolverhampton Wanderers	Bolton
15:00 GMT	Clough 23', 25'	Report	Dicko 3'; Henry 90+5'	Stadium: Macron Stadium; Attendance: 15,869 (2,284 away fans); Referee: Eddie Ilderton

7 February 2015 29	Wolverhampton Wanderers	1–2	Reading	Wolverhampton
15:00 GMT	Afobe 26'	Report	Pogrebnyak 1'; Williams 70'	Stadium: Molineux; Attendance: 20,274 (866 away fans); Referee: Keith Hill

10 February 2015 30	Huddersfield Town	1–4	Wolverhampton Wanderers	Huddersfield
19:45 GMT	Vaughan 63'	Report	Dicko 12', 90+1'; Coady 47' (o.g.); Afobe 61'	Stadium: John Smith's Stadium; Attendance: 11,843 (905 away fans); Referee: David Webb

14 February 2015 31	Norwich City	2–0	Wolverhampton Wanderers	Norwich
15:00 GMT	Johnson 28'; Grabban 67'	Report		Stadium: Carrow Road; Attendance: 26,322 (1,131 away fans); Referee: Neil Swarbrick

21 February 2015 32	Wolverhampton Wanderers	5–0	Rotherham United	Wolverhampton
15:00 GMT	Afobe 21', 63'; Dicko 28'; Edwards 74'; Sako 80'	Report		Stadium: Molineux; Attendance: 20,336 (828 away fans); Referee: Iain Williamson

24 February 2015 33	Wolverhampton Wanderers	3–0	Fulham	Wolverhampton
19:45 GMT	Batth 10'; Sako 40', 45+2'	Report		Stadium: Molineux; Attendance: 17,744 (173 away fans); Referee: Graham Salisbury

28 February 2015 34	Cardiff City	0–1	Wolverhampton Wanderers	Cardiff
15:00 GMT		Report	Sako 26'	Stadium: Cardiff City Stadium; Attendance: 21,165 (2,061 away fans); Referee: Robert Madley

3 March 2015 35	Bournemouth	2–1	Wolverhampton Wanderers	Bournemouth
19:45 GMT	Kermorgant 10', 49' (pen.)	Report	Afobe 39'	Stadium: Goldsands Stadium; Attendance: 9,851 (1,335 away fans); Referee: James Linington

7 March 2015 36	Wolverhampton Wanderers	2–2	Watford	Wolverhampton
15:00 GMT	Afobe 14'; Price 51'	Report	Vydra 30'; Deeney 65'	Stadium: Molineux; Attendance: 23,146 (2,339 away fans); Referee: Brendan Malone

14 March 2015 37	Brighton & Hove Albion	1–1	Wolverhampton Wanderers	Falmer
15:00 GMT	Bruno 70'	Report	van La Parra 74'	Stadium: AMEX Stadium; Attendance: 27,019 (2,111 away fans); Referee: Trevor Kettle

17 March 2015 38	Wolverhampton Wanderers	3–0	Sheffield Wednesday	Wolverhampton
19:45 GMT	Sako 18' (pen.); Afobe 55'; Henry 67'	Report		Stadium: Molineux; Attendance: 18,687 (1,156 away fans); Referee: Simon Hooper

20 March 2015 39	Wolverhampton Wanderers	2–0	Derby County	Wolverhampton
19:45 GMT	Dicko 48'; Grant 69' (o.g.)	Report		Stadium: Molineux; Attendance: 27,480 (2,567 away fans); Referee: Keith Stroud

3 April 2015 40	Nottingham Forest	1–2	Wolverhampton Wanderers	Nottingham
15:00 BST	Blackstock 90+4'	Report	Afobe 46'; Sako 72' (pen.)	Stadium: City Ground; Attendance: 27,185 (1,964 away fans); Referee: Andy D'Urso

6 April 2015 41	Wolverhampton Wanderers	4–3	Leeds United	Wolverhampton
17:15 BST	Dicko 19', 45+1'; Afobe 48'; Edwards 88'	Report	Taylor 11'; Batth 65' (o.g.); Mowatt 74'	Stadium: Molineux; Attendance: 25,169 (2,337 away fans); Referee: David Coote

11 April 2015 42	Birmingham City	2–1	Wolverhampton Wanderers	Birmingham
15:00 BST	Kiernan 25'; Gray 61'	Report	Afobe 21'	Stadium: St Andrew's; Attendance: 19,330 (4,068 away fans); Referee: Eddie Ilderton

14 April 2015 43	Middlesbrough	2–1	Wolverhampton Wanderers	Middlesbrough
19:45 BST	Vossen 3'; Bamford 11'	Report	Sako 53'	Stadium: Riverside Stadium; Attendance: 20,520 (862 away fans); Referee: Neil Swarbrick

18 April 2015 44	Wolverhampton Wanderers	1–1	Ipswich Town	Wolverhampton
12:15 BST	Afobe 50'	Report	Stearman 21' (o.g.)	Stadium: Molineux; Attendance: 23,409 (1,265 away fans); Referee: Stuart Attwell

25 April 2015 45	Wigan Athletic	0–1	Wolverhampton Wanderers	Wigan
15:00 BST		Report	Afobe 25'	Stadium: DW Stadium; Attendance: 16,810 (4,478 away fans); Referee: James Linington

2 May 2015 46	Wolverhampton Wanderers	4–2	Millwall	Wolverhampton
12:15 BST	Dicko 20', 56'; Ebanks-Landell 70'; Sako 90+1'	Report	O'Brien 58'; Philpot 82'	Stadium: Molineux; Attendance: 24,480 (1,236 away fans); Referee: Mark Haywood

Results summary

Overall								Home						Away					
Pld	W	D	L	GF	GA	GD	Pts	W	D	L	GF	GA	GD	W	D	L	GF	GA	GD
46	22	12	12	70	56	+14	78	13	6	4	42	23	+19	9	6	8	28	33	−5

Source: Statto.com

Results by round

Round	1	2	3	4	5	6	7	8	9	10	11	12	13	14	15	16	17	18	19	20	21	22	23	24	25	26	27	28	29	30	31	32	33	34	35	36	37	38	39	40	41	42	43	44	45	46
Result	W	L	W	W	W	D	D	W	D	L	D	D	W	W	D	L	L	L	L	L	W	D	W	W	W	W	D	D	L	W	L	W	W	W	L	D	D	W	W	W	W	L	L	D	W	W
Position	7	14	9	4	3	3	4	3	3	7	7	7	4	3	4	6	9	11	12	13	12	10	9	8	8	8	7	7	8	8	8	8	8	8	8	8	8	8	7	8	6	8	8	8	8	7

Source: Statto.com
W = Win; D = Draw; L = Loss

League table

Pos	Team	Pld	W	D	L	GF	GA	GD	Pts	Promotion, qualification or relegation
5	Brentford	46	23	9	14	78	59	+19	78	Qualification for Championship play-offs
6	Ipswich Town	46	22	12	12	72	54	+18	78	Qualification for Championship play-offs
7	Wolverhampton Wanderers	46	22	12	12	70	56	+14	78	
8	Derby County	46	21	14	11	85	56	+29	77	
9	Blackburn Rovers	46	17	16	13	66	59	+7	67	

Updated to match(es) played on 2 May 2015. Source: Sky Sports
Rules for classification: 1) Points; 2) Goal difference; 3) Number of goals scored

=== FA Cup ===
3 January 2015 R3	Fulham	0–0	Wolverhampton Wanderers	London
15:00 GMT		Report		Stadium: Craven Cottage; Attendance: 11,879 (2,293 away fans); Referee: Lee Probert

13 January 2015 R3 Rep.	Wolverhampton Wanderers	3–3 (a.e.t.) (3–5 p)	Fulham	Wolverhampton
19:45 GMT	Edwards 71', 109' van La Parra 73'	Report	Woodrow 27', 76'; McCormack 120+2' (pen.)	Stadium: Molineux; Attendance: 8,148 (205 away fans); Referee: David Coote
	Penalties
	Edwards (penalty scored); Doherty (penalty missed); Evans (penalty scored); Clarke (penalty scored)		(penalty scored) McCormack; (penalty scored) Woodrow; (penalty scored) Stafylidis; (penalty scored) Roberts; (penalty scored) Rodallega

=== League Cup ===
12 August 2014 R1	Wolverhampton Wanderers	2–3	Northampton Town	Wolverhampton
19:45 BST	Dicko 66'; Ricketts 67'	Report	D'Ath 58', 74'; Toney 63'	Stadium: Molineux; Attendance: 6,171 (586 away fans); Referee: Stuart Attwell

== Players ==
=== Statistics ===
Key:
‡ On loan from another club * First appearance(s) for the club

- # = Squad number
- Pos = Playing position
- P = Number of games played
- G = Number of goals scored
- GK = Goalkeeper
- DF = Defender
- MF = Midfielder
- FW = Forward
- = Yellow cards
- = Red cards
- † Permanent player left club during the season
- ¤ Loaned to another club for part or all of season

Correct as of end of season. Starting appearances are listed first, followed by substitute appearances in parentheses where applicable.

No.	Pos	Name	P	G	P	G	P	G	P	G	A yellow card	A red card	Notes
No.	Pos	Name	League		FA Cup		League Cup		Total		Discipline		Notes
1	GK	(Nigeria) Carl Ikeme	33	0	2	0	0	0	35	0	0	0	
2	DF	(Republic of Ireland) Matt Doherty	26(7)	0	2	0	1	0	29(7)	0	4	1	
3	DF	(England) Scott Golbourne	23(4)	0	0	0	0	0	23(4)	0	2	0	
4	MF	(Wales) David Edwards	32(9)	6	1(1)	2	0(1)	0	33(11)	8	3	0	
5	DF	(England) Richard Stearman	38(4)	0	2	0	1	0	41(4)	0	11	0	
6	DF	(England) Danny Batth	44	4	2	0	0	0	46	4	7	0	
7	MF	(England) James Henry	23(14)	5	2	0	1	0	26(14)	5	1	0	
8	MF	(England) David Davis †	0	0	0	0	0	0	0	0	0	0	
8	MF	(England) George Saville ¤	5(2)	0	0	0	0	0	5(2)	0	3	0	
9	FW	(England) Leon Clarke ¤	5(11)	2	1(1)	0	1	0	7(12)	2	3	0	
10	MF	(Mali) Bakary Sako	39(2)	15	1	0	0(1)	0	40(3)	15	2	1 (Note: Rescinded on appeal on 10 March)	
11	MF	(Scotland) Kevin McDonald	45(1)	0	1	0	0	0	46(1)	0	8	1	
12	FW	(Ivory Coast) Yannick Sagbo ‡	1(3)	0	0	0	0	0	1(3)	0	0	0	
12	FW	(England) Danny Graham ‡	5	1	0	0	0	0	5	1	0	0	
12	FW	(Democratic Republic of the Congo) Benik Afobe	19(2)	13	0	0	0	0	19(2)	13	1	0	
13	GK	(Republic of Ireland) Aaron McCarey	0	0	0	0	1	0	1	0	0	0	
14	MF	(Wales) Lee Evans	18(1)	1	2	0	1	0	21(1)	1	6	0	
15	MF	(England) Tommy Rowe	7(7)	0	0	0	0	0	7(7)	0	0	0	
16	FW	(Republic of Ireland) Kevin Doyle ¤	0(6)	0	0	0	0	0	0(6)	0	0	0	
17	MF	(Netherlands) Rajiv van La Parra	29(11)	1	1	1	0	0	30(11)	2	2	1 (Note: Rescinded on appeal on 9 December)	
18	DF	(Wales) Sam Ricketts (c) ¤	4	0	0	0	1	1	5	1	2	0	
19	MF	(England) Jack Price ¤	20(3)	1	2	0	1	0	22(4)	1	5	0	
20	FW	(Republic of Ireland) Liam McAlinden ¤	1(5)	0	1	0	1	0	3(5)	0	0	0	
21	MF	(England) Zeli Ismail ¤	0	0	0	0	0	0	0	0	0	0	
23	DF	(England) Ethan Ebanks-Landell	9(5)	2	0	0	1	0	10(5)	2	2	0	
27	MF	(England) Michael Jacobs ¤	3(8)	0	0	0	1	0	4(8)	0	0	0	
29	GK	(Poland) Tomasz Kuszczak	13	0	0	0	0	0	13	0	0	0	
30	DF	(England) Kortney Hause ¤	15(2)	0	0	0	0	0	15(2)	0	1	0	
31	GK	(England) Jonathan Flatt ¤	0	0	0	0	0	0	0	0	0	0	
32	DF	(Republic of Ireland) Kevin Foley ¤†	0	0	0	0	0	0	0	0	0	0	
33	DF	(England) Dominic Iorfa	20	0	2	0	0	0	22	0	4	0	
39	FW	(France) Ibrahim Keita	0	0	0	0	0	0	0	0	0	0	
40	FW	(Mali) Nouha Dicko	30(7)	14	0(2)	0	0(1)	1	30(10)	15	5	0	

=== Awards ===
Award	Winner
Fans' Player of the Season	Richard Stearman
Players' Player of the Season	Richard Stearman
Young Player of the Season	Dominic Iorfa
Academy Player of the Season	Regan Upton
Goal of the Season	James Henry (vs Bolton, 31 January 2015)

== Transfers ==
=== In ===
Date	Player	From	Fee
3 June 2014	(England) Tommy Rowe	Peterborough United	Free
10 June 2014	(Netherlands) Rajiv van La Parra	(Netherlands) Heerenveen	Free
July 2014	(Scotland) Jordan Allan	(Scotland) Airdrieonians	Free
July 2014	(Slovakia) Christián Herc	(Slovakia) Nitra	Free
July 2014	(Republic of Ireland) Conor Levingston	(Republic of Ireland) Gorey Rangers	Free
July 2014	(Republic of Ireland) Connor Ronan	Rochdale	Free
21 August 2014	(Romania) Nicolae Carnat	(Romania) Hagi	Free
26 August 2014	(England) George Saville	Chelsea	£1,000,000
3 November 2014	(Poland) Tomasz Kuszczak	Unattached	Free
5 January 2015	(England) Jordan Graham	Aston Villa	Undisclosed
14 January 2015	(Democratic Republic of the Congo) Benik Afobe	Arsenal	£2,000,000

=== Out ===
Date	Player	To	Fee
June 2014	(England) Marcus Barnes	Released (Note: Following his release, Barnes joined Southampton.)	Free
June 2014	(England) Jordan Cranston	Released (Note: Following his release, Cranston joined Notts County on 1 September.)	Free
June 2014	(Cameroon) George Elokobi	Released (Note: Following his release, Elokobi joined Oldham Athletic on 8 August.)	Free
June 2014	(Sweden) Tim Jakobsson	Released	Free
June 2014	(Slovakia) Kristián Koštrna	Released (Note: Following his release, Koštrna joined Boleráz on 28 September.)	Free
June 2014	(England) Tyler Lyttle	Released (Note: Following his release, Lyttle joined Bristol Rovers.)	Free
June 2014	(England) David Moli	Released (Note: Following his release, Moli joined Boreham Wood on 14 September.)	Free
June 2014	(Wales) Robbie Parry	Released	Free
June 2014	(England) Jamie Reckord	Released (Note: Following his release, Reckord joined Ross County on 17 September.)	Free
June 2014	(Wales) Peter Smith	Released (Note: Following his release, Smith joined Ytterhogdals in 2018.)	Free
June 2014	(England) Jack Storer	Released (Note: Following his release, Storer joined Paget Rangers.)	Free
June 2014	(England) Jamie Tank	Released (Note: Following his release, Tank joined Leamington on 1 August.)	Free
June 2014	(England) Sam Whittall	Released (Note: Following his release, Whittall joined Cambridge United on 14 August.)	Free
18 June 2014	(England) Michael Ihiekwe	Tranmere Rovers	Free
11 August 2014	(England) David Davis	Birmingham City	£150,000
12 August 2014	(Republic of Ireland) Anthony Forde	Walsall	Undisclosed
15 August 2014	(Republic of Ireland) Stephen Ward	Burnley	Undisclosed
28 August 2014	(England) Jamie O'Hara	Released (Note: Following his release, O'Hara joined Blackpool on 5 November.)	Free
29 August 2014	(Mali) Tongo Doumbia	(France) Toulouse	Undisclosed
January 2015	(Denmark) Victor Wagner	Released (Note: Following his release, Wagner joined Esbjerg.)	Free
12 January 2015	(Republic of Ireland) Kevin Foley	Released (Note: Following his release, Foley joined Copenhagen on 12 January.)	Free
2 February 2015	(England) Roger Johnson	Released (Note: Following his release, Johnson joined Charlton Athletic on 3 February.)	Free
2 February 2015	(England) Ben Priest	(Scotland) Dundee	Free

=== Loans in ===
Date	Player	From	End date
30 September 2014	(Ivory Coast) Yannick Sagbo	Hull City	13 November 2014
14 November 2014	(England) Danny Graham	Sunderland	31 December 2014
27 November 2014	(England) Jordan Graham	Aston Villa	4 January 2015
27 November 2014	(England) Donovan Wilson	Bristol Rovers	4 January 2015

=== Loans out ===
Date	Player	To	End date
18 July 2014	(England) Zeli Ismail	Notts County	4 January 2015
25 July 2014	(Wales) Jake Cassidy	Notts County	4 January 2015
28 July 2014	(England) Kortney Hause	Gillingham	24 November 2014
1 September 2014	(England) Jack Price	Yeovil Town	4 October 2014
1 September 2014	(Republic of Ireland) Kevin Doyle	Crystal Palace	1 January 2015
11 September 2014	(Austria) Georg Margreitter	Chesterfield	13 December 2014
2 October 2014	(Republic of Ireland) Liam McAlinden	Fleetwood Town	30 October 2014
7 October 2014	(England) Jack Price	Leyton Orient	3 December 2014
9 October 2014	(Guinea-Bissau) Eusébio Bancessi	Cheltenham Town	6 November 2014
20 November 2014	(England) Jonathan Flatt	(Wales) Wrexham	5 January 2015
27 November 2014	(Republic of Ireland) Kevin Foley	Blackpool	3 January 2015
13 January 2015	(Iceland) Björn Sigurðarson	(Denmark) Copenhagen	30 June 2015
15 January 2015	(Republic of Ireland) Liam McAlinden	Fleetwood Town	End of season
15 January 2015	(Wales) Jake Cassidy	Southend United	End of season
15 January 2015	(England) George Saville	Bristol City	20 April 2015
23 January 2015	(England) Scott Dutton	Crawley Town	21 February 2015
2 February 2015	(England) Ashley Carter	Chesterfield	End of season
2 February 2015	(England) Leon Clarke	Wigan Athletic	End of season
12 March 2015	(England) Michael Jacobs	Blackpool	9 April 2015
21 March 2015	(Wales) Sam Ricketts	Swindon Town	End of season
26 March 2015	(England) Jonathan Flatt	Chesterfield	24 April 2015

== Management and coaching staff ==
Position	Name
Head coach	Kenny Jackett
Assistant head coach	Joe Gallen
First Team Fitness and Conditioning coach	Tony Daley
Goalkeeping coach	Pat Mountain
Head of Football Development and Recruitment	Kevin Thelwell
Head of Recruitment	Stuart Webber
Academy Manager	Gareth Prosser
Club Doctor	Dr Matthew Perry
Club Physio	Carl Howarth

== Kit ==
The season brought both new home and away kits again manufactured by supplier PUMA. The new home kit featured the club's traditional gold and black colours with black arms, which had been worn on the final day of the previous season, while the away kit was an all white design with black collar. Both shirts featured sponsor What House? for a second and final season.
