= 2013–14 Wolverhampton Wanderers F.C. season =

English football club season

Wolverhampton Wanderers
2013–14 season
- Chairman: Steve Morgan OBE
- Head coach: Kenny Jackett
- League One: 1st (3rd divisional title)
- FA Cup: 1st round
- League Cup: 1st round
- Football League Trophy: 2nd round
- Top goalscorer: League: Nouha Dicko, Leigh Griffiths and Bakary Sako (12); All: Leigh Griffiths & Bakary Sako (13)
- Highest home attendance: 30,110 (vs Rotherham, 18 April 2014)
- Lowest home attendance: 4,226 (vs Oldham, 19 November 2013)
- Average home league attendance: 20,878
Home colours	Away colours

The 2013–14 season was the 115th season of competitive league football in the history of English football club Wolverhampton Wanderers. The club competed in League One, the third tier of the English football system for the first time since 1988–89. The previous season had brought relegation for a second successive season.

Former Millwall manager Kenny Jackett was appointed as Wolves' new head coach in the close season, replacing Dean Saunders who was fired after overseeing their relegation.

The team achieved promotion back to the Championship with four games to spare, setting a new club record points tally for a season in the process. Their third title at this level was confirmed on 21 April as the team went on to create a new record points amount for the third tier, reaching 103 points, until Birmingham City surpassed the record in the 2024–25 season, finishing on 111 points.

== Season review ==
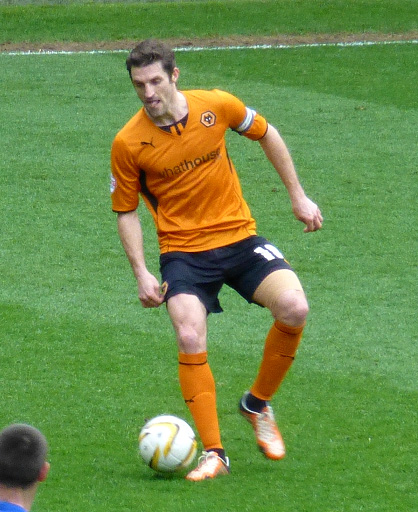
Sam Ricketts was appointed captain.

After a second consecutive relegation and four different managers during the previous sixteen months, Kenny Jackett, who had resigned from Millwall weeks earlier, was appointed on 31 May 2013 in the newly titled role of head coach. When pre-season training began on 24 June, Jackett announced that four key first team players – Karl Henry, Stephen Ward, Jamie O’Hara and Roger Johnson – were all now transfer-listed and that he intended to make greater usage of the club's academy players. In addition to the transfer listed players, further key players such as Sylvan Ebanks-Blake, Stephen Hunt and Christophe Berra did not have their contracts renewed as the club sought to reduce their salary commitments. Only three new signings were made during the summer transfer window: free signing Sam Ricketts, who became club captain, as well as Kevin McDonald and Scott Golbourne from Sheffield United and Barnsley, respectively.

Wolves' first fixture in the third tier since 1989 was a goalless draw at Preston. This was followed by five consecutive league wins to bring the team into the automatic promotion places and earn Jackett a nomination for August's Manager of the Month Award. Despite their unbeaten league run being ended by local rivals Walsall, a run of eleven unbeaten matches brought them to the top of the table by mid-November.

The following seven matches brought only one victory though, and by early January both Leyton Orient and Brentford stood above Wolves with further games in hand. Wolves sought to strength their squad and recruited five players during the January transfer window - two being loan deals of James Henry and Michael Jacobs being made into permanent signings. Strikers Leigh Griffiths and Kevin Doyle (on loan) were both allowed to leave, with two former players, Nouha Dicko and Leon Clarke being bought as replacements.

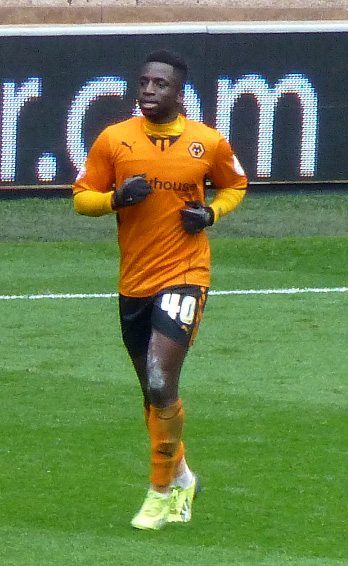
Nouha Dicko scored 13 goals in the final four months.

With this new squad, the team recorded a club record nine straight victories - including a 3–0 success at promotion rivals Brentford - to return to the top of the table. Although suffering a final defeat of the campaign at Crawley in mid-March, on 12 April, promotion was secured with a 2–0 win at Crewe Alexandra that ensured the club's exit from League One after a solitary season. After two further wins, they were confirmed as champions after Brentford failed to beat MK Dons hours after Wolves had won at Leyton Orient, who had led the table for much of the early part of the season.

A final day win that relegated Carlisle ensured that Wolves set a new points record for the third tier as they reached 103 points. En route to the title, the team also set numerous new club records, including a new points record (surpassing the 92 points they set when last in the third tier) and a record nine consecutive wins, as well as equalling their previous best run of five consecutive away wins. At the conclusion of the season, Kenny Jackett was joint-winner of the LMA Awards Manager of the Year for League One, having earlier won the monthly award for March 2014.

== Results ==
=== Preseason ===
10 July 2013	East Fife	2–3	Wolverhampton Wanderers	Methil
20:00 BST	Jackson 43' (pen.); Nadé 78'	Report	Sigurðarson 31'; Griffiths 48'; Doumbia 64'	Stadium: Bayview Stadium; Referee: David Somers

13 July 2013	Livingston	1–2	Wolverhampton Wanderers	Livingston
14:00 BST	McNulty 12'	Report	Elokobi 35'; Davis 50'	Stadium: Energy Assets Arena; Attendance: 928

16 July 2013	Wrexham	1–2	Wolverhampton Wanderers	Wrexham
19:30 BST	Harris 12'	Report	Cassidy 51'; Griffiths 60'	Stadium: Racecourse Ground; Attendance: 1,852; Referee: James Walker

20 July 2013	Barnsley	2–2	Wolverhampton Wanderers	Barnsley
15:00 BST	Mellis 5'; O'Grady 57'	Report	Ismail 2'; Batth 25'	Stadium: Oakwell; Attendance: 2,501 (261 away); Referee: Mark Haywood

23 July 2013	Chesterfield	1–2	Wolverhampton Wanderers	Chesterfield
19:45 BST	Talbot 29'	Report	Edwards 7'; Griffiths 65'	Stadium: Proact Stadium; Attendance: 2,469; Referee: Michael Naylor

27 July 2013	Wolverhampton Wanderers	2–3	Real Betis	Wolverhampton
15:00 BST	Stearman 4'; Griffiths 50'	Report	Sevilla 15'; Cedrick 55'; Matilla 70'	Stadium: Molineux; Attendance: 7,741; Referee: Andre Marriner

=== League One ===
A total of 24 teams competed in League One in the 2013–14 season. Each team played every other team twice, once at their stadium, and once at the opposition's. Three points were awarded to teams for each win, one point per draw, and none for defeats.

The provisional fixture list was released on 19 June 2013 with the exception of the club's opening fixture, which was announced one day earlier having been selected as part of The Football League's 125th anniversary.

3 August 2013 1	Preston North End	0–0	Wolverhampton Wanderers	Preston
15:00 BST		Report		Stadium: Deepdale; Attendance: 16,583 (4,968 away fans); Referee: Andy Haines

10 August 2013 2	Wolverhampton Wanderers	4–0	Gillingham	Wolverhampton
15:00 BST	Griffiths 5', 68' (pen.); Evans 26'; Sako 31'	Report		Stadium: Molineux; Attendance: 19,102 (1,222 away fans); Referee: Stuart Attwell

17 August 2013 3	Bristol City	1–2	Wolverhampton Wanderers	Bristol
15:00 BST	Emmanuel-Thomas 53'	Report	Sako 22'; Doherty 85'	Stadium: Ashton Gate; Attendance: 14,393 (2,250 away fans); Referee: Darren Sheldrake

23 August 2013 4	Wolverhampton Wanderers	2–1	Crawley Town	Wolverhampton
19:45 BST	Sigurðarson 12'; Griffiths 90+4' (pen.)	Report	Clarke 90+1'	Stadium: Molineux; Attendance: 17,406 (225 away fans); Referee: Simon Hooper

31 August 2013 5	Port Vale	1–3	Wolverhampton Wanderers	Burslem
15:00 BST	Pope 90+2'	Report	Griffiths 56'; Sigurðarson 75'; McDonald 83'	Stadium: Vale Park; Attendance: 12,601 (4,461 away fans); Referee: Graham Scott

14 September 2013 6	Wolverhampton Wanderers	3–2	Swindon Town	Wolverhampton
15:00 BST	Golbourne 3'; Doyle 43'; Foley 90'	Report	N'Guessan 82'; Mason 90+1'	Stadium: Molineux; Attendance: 19,388 (1,633 away fans); Referee: Gary Sutton

17 September 2013 7	Wolverhampton Wanderers	0–1	Walsall	Wolverhampton
19:45 BST		Report	Butler 69'	Stadium: Molineux; Attendance: 22,240 (2,344 away fans); Referee: Mick Russell

21 September 2013 8	Shrewsbury Town	0–1	Wolverhampton Wanderers	Shrewsbury
13:00 BST		Report	Sako 84' (pen.)	Stadium: Greenhous Meadow; Attendance: 9,510 (1,593 away fans); Referee: Phil Gibbs

28 September 2013 9	Wolverhampton Wanderers	2–0	Sheffield United	Wolverhampton
15:00 BST	Griffiths 66'; Sako 90+1'	Report		Stadium: Molineux; Attendance: 20,417 (1,569 away fans); Referee: Dean Whitestone

5 October 2013 10	Colchester United	0–3	Wolverhampton Wanderers	Colchester
15:00 BST	Sears (penalty missed) 86'	Report	Griffiths 20' (pen.), 48'; Doyle 55'	Stadium: Weston Homes Community Stadium; Attendance: 7,295 (2,228 away fans); Referee: Tim Robinson

19 October 2013 11	Wolverhampton Wanderers	1–1	Coventry City	Wolverhampton
15:00 BST	Griffiths 68'	Report	Phillips 86'	Stadium: Molineux; Attendance: 22,939 (3,407 away fans); Referee: Fred Graham

22 October 2013 12	Wolverhampton Wanderers	2–0	Oldham Athletic	Wolverhampton
19:45 BST	Henry 50'; Griffiths 66'	Report		Stadium: Molineux; Attendance: 15,959 (545 away fans); Referee: Mark Haywood

26 October 2013 13	Bradford City	1–2	Wolverhampton Wanderers	Bradford
15:00 BST	De Vita 14'	Report	Henry 28'; Stearman 32'	Stadium: Coral Windows Stadium; Attendance: 18,044 (2,437 away fans); Referee: Graham Salisbury

2 November 2013 14	Wolverhampton Wanderers	2–0	Stevenage	Wolverhampton
15:00 GMT	Doyle 7'; Henry 81'	Report		Stadium: Molineux; Attendance: 17,700 (562 away fans); Referee: Kevin Wright

5 November 2013 15	Carlisle United	2–2	Wolverhampton Wanderers	Carlisle
19:45 GMT	Buaben 30'; Noble 54' (pen.)	Report	Sako 8'; Griffiths 42'	Stadium: Brunton Park; Attendance: 5,369 (1,335 away fans); Referee: Scott Mathieson

16 November 2013 16	Notts County	0–1	Wolverhampton Wanderers	Nottingham
15:00 GMT		Report	Ebanks-Landell 76'	Stadium: Meadow Lane; Attendance: 7,520 (2,730 away fans); Referee: David Webb

23 November 2013 17	Wolverhampton Wanderers	0–0	Brentford	Wolverhampton
15:00 GMT		Report		Stadium: Molineux; Attendance: 19,061 (2,014 away fans); Referee: Michael Naylor

26 November 2013 18	Wolverhampton Wanderers	2–0	Tranmere Rovers	Wolverhampton
19:45 GMT	Griffiths 17'; Edwards 42'	Report		Stadium: Molineux; Attendance: 14,989 (379 away fans); Referee: Graham Scott

30 November 2013 19	Peterborough United	1–0	Wolverhampton Wanderers	Peterborough
15:00 GMT	Bostwick 79'	Report		Stadium: London Road; Attendance: 8,170 (1,666 away fans); Referee: Robert Madley

14 December 2013 20	Wolverhampton Wanderers	0–2	Milton Keynes Dons	Wolverhampton
15:00 GMT		Report	Bamford 31'; Reeves 50'	Stadium: Molineux; Attendance: 17,142 (851 away fans); Referee: Darren Sheldrake

21 December 2013 21	Rotherham United	3–3	Wolverhampton Wanderers	Rotherham
15:00 GMT	Dicko 11', 54'; Agard 37'	Report	Batth 10'; Sako 59' (pen.); Henry 64'	Stadium: New York Stadium; Attendance: 11,092 (2,220 away fans); Referee: Michael Oliver

26 December 2013 22	Wolverhampton Wanderers	2–0	Crewe Alexandra	Wolverhampton
15:00 GMT	Jacobs 3'; Griffiths 90+2'	Report		Stadium: Molineux; Attendance: 22,693 (783 away fans); Referee: Stuart Attwell

29 December 2013 23	Wolverhampton Wanderers	1–1	Leyton Orient	Wolverhampton
15:00 GMT	Ebanks-Landell 5'	Report	Baudry 60'	Stadium: Molineux; Attendance: 28,598 (2,172 away fans); Referee: David Coote

1 January 2014 24	Tranmere Rovers	1–1	Wolverhampton Wanderers	Birkenhead
15:00 GMT	Lowe 34'	Report	Edwards 55'	Stadium: Prenton Park; Attendance: 6,158 (1,574 away fans); Referee: Darren Deadman

3 January 2014 25	Gillingham	1–0	Wolverhampton Wanderers	Gillingham
19:45 GMT	McDonald 90+2'	Report		Stadium: MEMS Priestfield Stadium; Attendance: 7,758 (910 away fans); Referee: Mark Brown

11 January 2014 26	Wolverhampton Wanderers	2–0	Preston North End	Wolverhampton
15:00 GMT	Edwards 28'; Evans 55'	Report		Stadium: Molineux; Attendance: 20,434 (3,464 away fans); Referee: Scott Mathieson

25 January 2014 27	Wolverhampton Wanderers	3–1	Bristol City	Wolverhampton
15:00 GMT	Dicko 10'; Williams 44' (o.g.); Sako 76'	Report	Baldock 24' (pen.)	Stadium: Molineux; Attendance: 18,501 (994 away fans); Referee: Nigel Miller

28 January 2014 28	Oldham Athletic	0–3	Wolverhampton Wanderers	Oldham
19:45 GMT		Report	McDonald 83'; Jacobs 89'; Henry 90+4'	Stadium: Boundary Park; Attendance: 4,343 (1,058 away fans); Referee: Graham Salisbury

1 February 2014 29	Wolverhampton Wanderers	2–0	Bradford City	Wolverhampton
15:00 GMT	McDonald 45+4'; Dicko 57'	Report		Stadium: Molineux; Attendance: 19,498 (1,991 away fans); Referee: Scott Duncan

15 February 2014 30	Wolverhampton Wanderers	2–0	Notts County	Wolverhampton
15:00 GMT	Jacobs 17', 54'	Report		Stadium: Molineux; Attendance: 18,019 (712 away fans); Referee: Jeremy Simpson

22 February 2014 31	Brentford	0–3	Wolverhampton Wanderers	London
15:00 GMT		Report	Henry 45+1'; Jacobs 72', 85'	Stadium: Griffin Park; Attendance: 11,309 (1,600 away fans); Referee: Iain Williamson

1 March 2014 32	Wolverhampton Wanderers	3–0	Port Vale	Wolverhampton
15:00 GMT	Sako 52'; Dicko 73', 75' (penalty missed) 90'	Report		Stadium: Molineux; Attendance: 21,929 (2,320 away fans); Referee: Craig Pawson

8 March 2014 33	Walsall	0–3	Wolverhampton Wanderers	Walsall
15:00 GMT		Report	Dicko 31', 48'; Sako 67'	Stadium: Banks's Stadium; Attendance: 10,139 (3,444 away fans); Referee: Paul Tierney

11 March 2014 34	Swindon Town	1–4	Wolverhampton Wanderers	Swindon
19:45 GMT	Smith 74'	Report	Sako 9', 34'; Dicko 19'; Clarke 90+3'	Stadium: County Ground; Attendance: 9,670 (2,140 away fans); Referee: Lee Collins

15 March 2014 35	Wolverhampton Wanderers	0–0	Shrewsbury Town	Wolverhampton
15:00 GMT		Report		Stadium: Molineux; Attendance: 24,012 (2,141 away fans); Referee: Andy Madley

18 March 2014 36	Crawley Town	2–1	Wolverhampton Wanderers	Crawley
19:45 GMT	Clarke 27'; Tubbs 32'	Report	Henry 25'	Stadium: Checkatrade.com Stadium; Attendance: 5,680 (1,962 away fans); Referee: Carl Berry

22 March 2014 37	Sheffield United	0–2	Wolverhampton Wanderers	Sheffield
13:25 GMT		Report	Henry 13'; Edwards 53'	Stadium: Bramall Lane; Attendance: 21,659 (2,856 away fans); Referee: Kevin Friend

25 March 2014 38	Wolverhampton Wanderers	4–2	Colchester United	Wolverhampton
19:45 GMT	Jacobs 2'; Edwards 27'; Henry 44'; Dicko 90+5'	Report	Gilbey 58'; Szmodics 72'	Stadium: Molineux; Attendance: 17,041 (211 away fans); Referee: Andy Woolmer

29 March 2014 39	Milton Keynes Dons	0–1	Wolverhampton Wanderers	Milton Keynes
15:00 GMT		Report	McAlinden 81'	Stadium: Stadium mk Attendance: 20,516 (8,943 away); Referee: Kevin Wright

1 April 2014 40	Stevenage	0–0	Wolverhampton Wanderers	Stevenage
19:45 BST		Report		Stadium: Lamex Stadium; Attendance: 4,660 (1,853 away fans); Referee: Dean Whitestone

5 April 2014 41	Wolverhampton Wanderers	2–0	Peterborough United	Wolverhampton
15:00 BST	Batth 48'; Edwards 69'; Sako (penalty missed) 73'	Report		Stadium: Molineux; Attendance: 23,204 (746 away fans); Referee: James Linington

12 April 2014 42	Crewe Alexandra	0–2	Wolverhampton Wanderers	Crewe
15:07 BST		Report	McDonald 45'; Edwards 66'	Stadium: Alexandra Stadium; Attendance: 6,424 (2,254 away fans); Referee: Darren Bond

18 April 2014 43	Wolverhampton Wanderers	6–4	Rotherham United	Wolverhampton
15:10 BST	Dicko 21', 34', 80'; Edwards 38'; Ricketts 90'; McDonald 90+7'	Report	Agard 14', 61', 88'; Skarz 84'	Stadium: Molineux; Attendance: 30,110 (2,285 away fans); Referee: Fred Graham

21 April 2014 44	Leyton Orient	1–3	Wolverhampton Wanderers	London
12:15 BST	Cox 48'	Report	Stearman 17'; Sako 32'; Henry 90+6'	Stadium: Matchroom Stadium; Attendance: 8,161 (2,527 away fans); Referee: Neil Swarbrick

26 April 2014 45	Coventry City	1–1	Wolverhampton Wanderers	Northampton
15:00 BST	Batth 86' (o.g.)	Report	Edwards 84'	Stadium: Sixfields Stadium; Attendance: 4,252 (2,170 away fans); Referee: Brendan Malone

3 May 2014 46	Wolverhampton Wanderers	3–0	Carlisle United	Wolverhampton
15:00 BST	Ricketts 5'; Jacobs 24'; Dicko 57'	Report		Stadium: Molineux; Attendance: 29,829 (997 away fans); Referee: Andy D'Urso

Final table

Pos	Team	Pld	W	D	L	GF	GA	GD	Pts	Promotion, qualification or relegation
1	Wolverhampton Wanderers (C, P)	46	31	10	5	89	31	+58	103	Promotion to Football League Championship
2	Brentford (P)	46	28	10	8	72	43	+29	94	Promotion to Football League Championship
3	Leyton Orient	46	25	11	10	85	45	+40	86	Qualification for League One play-offs (Note: Four teams play for one spot and promotion to Football League Championship.)
4	Rotherham United (O, P)	46	24	14	8	86	58	+28	86	Qualification for League One play-offs
5	Preston North End	46	23	16	7	72	46	+26	85	Qualification for League One play-offs

Updated to match(es) played on 3 May 2014. Source: BBC Sport
Rules for classification: 1) Points; 2) Goal difference; 3) Number of goals scored
(C) Champions; (O) Play-off winners; (P) Promoted
Notes:

Results summary

Overall								Home						Away					
Pld	W	D	L	GF	GA	GD	Pts	W	D	L	GF	GA	GD	W	D	L	GF	GA	GD
46	31	10	5	89	31	+58	103	17	4	2	48	15	+33	14	6	3	41	16	+25

Source: Statto.com

Results by round

Round	1	2	3	4	5	6	7	8	9	10	11	12	13	14	15	16	17	18	19	20	21	22	23	24	25	26	27	28	29	30	31	32	33	34	35	36	37	38	39	40	41	42	43	44	45	46
Result	D	W	W	W	W	W	L	W	W	W	D	W	W	W	D	W	D	W	L	L	D	W	D	D	L	W	W	W	W	W	W	W	W	W	D	L	W	W	W	D	W	W	W	W	D	W
Position	14	6	3	1	2	3	3	3	3	3	3	3	2	2	2	1	2	1	2	2	2	2	3	2	2	3	3	3	2	2	2	1	1	1	1	1	1	1	1	1	1	1	1	1	1	1

Source: Statto.com
W = Win; D = Draw; L = Loss

=== FA Cup ===
9 November 2013 R1	Oldham Athletic	1–1	Wolverhampton Wanderers	Oldham
15:00 GMT	Kusunga 2'	Report	Golbourne 37'	Stadium: Boundary Park; Attendance: 3,916 (831 away fans); Referee: Geoff Eltringham

19 November 2013 R1 rep.	Wolverhampton Wanderers	1–2	Oldham Athletic	Wolverhampton
19:45 GMT	Griffiths 90+5'	Report	Philliskirk 21'; Rooney 73'	Stadium: Molineux; Attendance: 4,226 (226 away fans); Referee: Keith Stroud

=== League Cup ===
6 August 2013 R1	Morecambe	1–0	Wolverhampton Wanderers	Morecambe
19:45 BST	Williams 84'	Report		Stadium: Globe Arena; Attendance: 2,545 (724 away fans); Referee: Geoff Eltringham

=== Football League Trophy ===
3 September 2013 R1	Wolverhampton Wanderers	2–2 (4–2 p)	Walsall	Wolverhampton
19:45 BST	McAlinden 5'; Sako 64'	Report	Hemmings 54'; Hewitt 85'	Stadium: Molineux; Attendance: 13,481 (1,818 away fans); Referee: Darren Deadman
	Penalties
	Sigurðarson (penalty scored); Sako (penalty scored); Doherty (penalty scored); Davis (penalty scored)		(penalty missed) Westcarr; (penalty missed) Taylor; (penalty scored) Mantom; (penalty scored) Downing

8 October 2013 R2	Wolverhampton Wanderers	0–0 (1–3 p)	Notts County	Wolverhampton
19:45 BST		Report		Stadium: Molineux; Attendance: 7,166 (102 away fans); Referee: Andy D'Urso
	Penalties
	Griffiths (penalty scored); Sigurðarson (penalty missed); Foley (penalty missed); Henry (penalty missed)		(penalty scored) Haynes; (penalty scored) Labadie; (penalty scored) Fotheringham

== Players ==
=== Statistics ===
Key:
‡ On loan from another club * First appearance(s) for the club

- # = Squad number
- Pos = Playing position
- P = Number of games played
- G = Number of goals scored
- GK = Goalkeeper
- DF = Defender
- MF = Midfielder
- FW = Forward
- = Yellow cards
- = Red cards
- † Permanent player left club during the season
- ¤ Loaned to another club for part or all of season

Correct as of end of season. Starting appearances are listed first, followed by substitute appearances in parentheses where applicable.

No.	Pos	Name	P	G	P	G	P	G	P	G	P	G	A yellow card	A red card	Notes
No.	Pos	Name	League		FA Cup		League Cup		Other		Total		Discipline		Notes
1	GK	(Wales) Wayne Hennessey ¤†	0	0	0	0	0	0	0	0	0	0	0	0	
2	DF	(Republic of Ireland) Matt Doherty	15(3)	1	0	0	1	0	1	0	17(3)	1	3	0	
3	DF	(Cameroon) George Elokobi	1(5)	0	1	0	0	0	2	0	4(5)	0	1	0	
4	MF	(Wales) David Edwards	22(8)	9	1	0	0	0	0	0	23(8)	9	0	0	
5	DF	(England) Richard Stearman	39(1)	2	2	0	0	0	1(1)	0	42(2)	2	4	1	
6	DF	(England) Danny Batth	46	2	2	0	1	0	1	0	50	2	10	0	
7	MF	(England) James Henry ‡	26(6)	10	1	0	0	0	1	0	28(6)	10	6	0	
8	MF	(England) David Davis	12(6)	0	1	0	1	0	1	0	15(6)	0	8	0	
9	FW	(Scotland) Leigh Griffiths †	18(8)	12	1(1)	1	1	0	1	0	21(9)	13	1	0	
9	FW	(England) Leon Clarke	4(9)	1	0	0	0	0	0	0	4(9)	1	1	0	
10	MF	(France) Bakary Sako	36(4)	12	1	0	0	0	1	1	38(4)	13	5	0	
11	MF	(Scotland) Kevin McDonald	39(2)	5	1	0	0	0	2	0	42(2)	5	8	0	
12	MF	(Republic of Ireland) Anthony Forde	0(3)	0	0	0	1	0	0(1)	0	1(4)	0	0	0	
13	GK	(Nigeria) Carl Ikeme	41	0	2	0	1	0	1	0	45	0	2	0	
14	MF	(Wales) Lee Evans	19(7)	2	0(1)	0	0(1)	0	0	0	19(9)	2	5	0	
15	FW	(Iceland) Björn Sigurðarson ¤	7(11)	2	1	0	0	0	1(1)	0	9(12)	2	2	0	
16	FW	(Wales) Jake Cassidy ¤	4(10)	0	2	0	1	0	1	0	8(10)	0	2	0	
17	MF	(Togo) Razak Boukari ¤	0	0	0	0	0	0	0	0	0	0	0	0	
18	DF	(Wales) Sam Ricketts (c)	42(2)	2	1(1)	0	0	0	0	0	43(3)	2	3	0	
19	MF	(England) Jack Price	20(6)	0	2	0	0	0	2	0	24(6)	0	4	0	
20	FW	(Republic of Ireland) Liam McAlinden ¤	2(5)	1	0	0	0(1)	0	1(1)	1	3(7)	2	0	0	
21	MF	(England) Zeli Ismail ¤	5(4)	0	0(1)	0	1	0	0	0	6(5)	0	1	0	
22	DF	(England) Jamie Reckord ¤	0	0	0	0	1	0	0	0	1	0	0	0	
22	FW	(Wales) Bradley Reid ¤	0	0	0	0	0	0	0	0	0	0	0	0	
23	DF	(England) Ethan Ebanks-Landell	4(3)	2	1	0	1	0	1	0	7(3)	2	0	0	
25	MF	(England) Jamie O'Hara	0(2)	0	0	0	0	0	0	0	0(2)	0	0	0	
26	DF	(England) Scott Golbourne	39(1)	1	2	1	0	0	2	0	43(1)	2	1	0	
27	MF	(England) Michael Jacobs ‡	28(2)	8	0	0	0	0	0	0	28(2)	8	1	0	
28	MF	(Mali) Tongo Doumbia ¤	0	0	0	0	0	0	0	0	0	0	0	0	
29	FW	(Republic of Ireland) Kevin Doyle ¤	16(7)	3	0(1)	0	0(1)	0	0	0	16(9)	3	1	0	
31	GK	(Republic of Ireland) Aaron McCarey ¤	5	0	0	0	0	0	1	0	6	0	0	0	
32	DF	(Republic of Ireland) Kevin Foley ¤	0(5)	1	0	0	1	0	1	0	2(5)	1	0	0	
34	DF	(Austria) Georg Margreitter ¤	0	0	0	0	0	0	0	0	0	0	0	0	
39	DF	(England) Michael Ihiekwe ¤	0	0	0	0	0	0	0	0	0	0	0	0	
40	FW	(France) Nouha Dicko	17(2)	12	0	0	0	0	0	0	17(2)	12	2	0	
41	GK	(England) Jonathan Flatt	0	0	0	0	0	0	0	0	0	0	0	0	
47	MF	(Portugal) Eusébio Bancessi	0	0	0	0	0	0	0	0	0	0	0	0	
50	FW	(France) Ibrahim Keita	0	0	0	0	0	0	0	0	0	0	0	0	

=== Awards ===
Award	Winner
Fans' Player of the Season	Kevin McDonald
Players' Player of the Season	Kevin McDonald
Young Player of the Season	Jack Price
Academy Player of the Season	Declan Weeks
Goal of the Season	Michael Jacobs (vs Brentford, 22 February 2014)

== Transfers ==
=== In ===
Date	Player	From	Fee
July 2013	(Republic of Ireland) Anthony Breslin	(Republic of Ireland) St. Kevin's Boys	Free
July 2013	(England) Aaron Hayden	Chelsea	Free
July 2013	(Denmark) Victor Wagner	(Denmark) Esbjerg fB	Free
4 July 2013	(Wales) Sam Ricketts	Bolton Wanderers	Free
15 July 2013	(Spain) Albert Torras	(Spain) Barcelona	Free
14 August 2013	(Scotland) Kevin McDonald	Sheffield United	£750,000
30 August 2013	(England) Scott Golbourne	Barnsley	£700,000
3 January 2014	(England) James Henry	Millwall	£250,000
8 January 2014	(England) Michael Jacobs	Derby County	£200,000
13 January 2014	(Mali) Nouha Dicko	Wigan Athletic	£300,000
30 January 2014	(England) Leon Clarke	Coventry City	£750,000
31 January 2014	(England) Kortney Hause	Wycombe Wanderers	£45,000
31 January 2014	(Romania) Răzvan Oaidă	(Romania) Atletico Arad	Free

=== Out ===
Date	Player	To	Fee
June 2013	(England) Jody Craddock	Retired	–
June 2013	(Scotland) Christophe Berra	Released	Free
June 2013	(England) Josh Cooke	Released	Free
June 2013	(Slovenia) Aljaž Cotman	Released	Free
June 2013	(England) Dominic Dell	Released	Free
June 2013	(England) Sylvan Ebanks-Blake	Released	Free
June 2013	(Northern Ireland) Johnny Gorman	Released	Free
June 2013	(Republic of Ireland) Stephen Hunt	Released	Free
June 2013	(England) Luke Ifil	Released	Free
June 2013	(Republic of Ireland) Cieron Keane	Released	Free
June 2013	(England) Jake Kempton	Released	Free
June 2013	(Republic of Ireland) Gary O'Neill	Released	Free
June 2013	(England) Sam Winnall	Released	Free
24 June 2013	(England) Adam Hammill	Huddersfield Town	£750,000
3 July 2013	(Netherlands) Dorus de Vries	Nottingham Forest	Free
12 July 2013	(Iceland) Eggert Jónsson	Released	Free
23 July 2013	(England) Karl Henry	Queens Park Rangers	£1,000,000
1 January 2014	(Australia) Patrick Antelmi	Wigan Athletic	Free
31 January 2014	(Wales) Wayne Hennessey	Crystal Palace	£3,000,000
31 January 2014	(Scotland) Leigh Griffiths	(Scotland) Celtic	£2,000,000

=== Loans in ===
Date	Player	From	End date
1 October 2013	(England) James Henry	Millwall	1 January 2014
11 November 2013	(England) Michael Jacobs	Derby County	4 January 2014

=== Loans out ===
Date	Player	To	End date
6 August 2013	(Mali) Tongo Doumbia	(France) Valenciennes	End of season
16 August 2013	(Republic of Ireland) Stephen Ward	Brighton & Hove Albion	End of season
21 August 2013	(Wales) Wayne Hennessey	Yeovil Town	17 November 2013
27 August 2013	(Togo) Razak Boukari	(France) Sochaux	End of season
2 September 2013	(Austria) Georg Margreitter	(Denmark) Copenhagen	End of season
2 September 2013	(England) Jamie Reckord	Plymouth Argyle	1 January 2014
16 September 2013	(England) Roger Johnson	Sheffield Wednesday	2 January 2014
11 October 2013	(Republic of Ireland) Liam McAlinden	Shrewsbury Town	6 December 2013
18 October 2013	(England) Dave Moli	Boreham Wood	End of season
28 November 2013	(Republic of Ireland) Aaron McCarey	York City	2 January 2014
6 January 2014	(England) Roger Johnson	West Ham United	End of season
8 January 2014	(England) Zeli Ismail	Burton Albion	End of season
10 January 2014	(England) Michael Ihiekwe	Cheltenham Town	End of season
24 January 2014	(Wales) Jake Cassidy	Tranmere Rovers	27 April 2014
25 January 2014	(England) Jamie Reckord	Swindon Town	28 April 2014
31 January 2014	(Republic of Ireland) Kevin Doyle	Queens Park Rangers	End of season
31 January 2014	(Iceland) Björn Sigurðarson	(Norway) Molde	31 December 2014
27 February 2014	(Republic of Ireland) Kevin Foley	Blackpool	31 March 2014
18 March 2014	(England) Dominic Iorfa	Shrewsbury Town	18 April 2014
27 March 2014	(Wales) Bradley Reid	(Wales) Wrexham	End of season

== Management and coaching staff ==
Position	Name
Head coach	Kenny Jackett
Assistant head coach	Joe Gallen
Development coach	Steve Weaver
First Team Fitness and Conditioning coach	Tony Daley
Goalkeeping coach	Pat Mountain
Head of Football Development and Recruitment	Kevin Thelwell
Head of Recruitment	Stuart Webber
Assistant Academy Manager / Under-18's coach	Mick Halsall
Club Doctor	Dr Matthew Perry
Club Physio	Phil Hayward

== Kit ==
The season brought both new home and away kits manufactured by new supplier PUMA, who had previously worked with Wolves during the 1990s. The new home kit featured the club's traditional gold and black colours, while the away kit was all purple with white trimming. Both shirts featured new sponsor What House?, a property company that had agreed a two-year deal with the football club.
