= Danny Batth =

English footballer (born 1990)

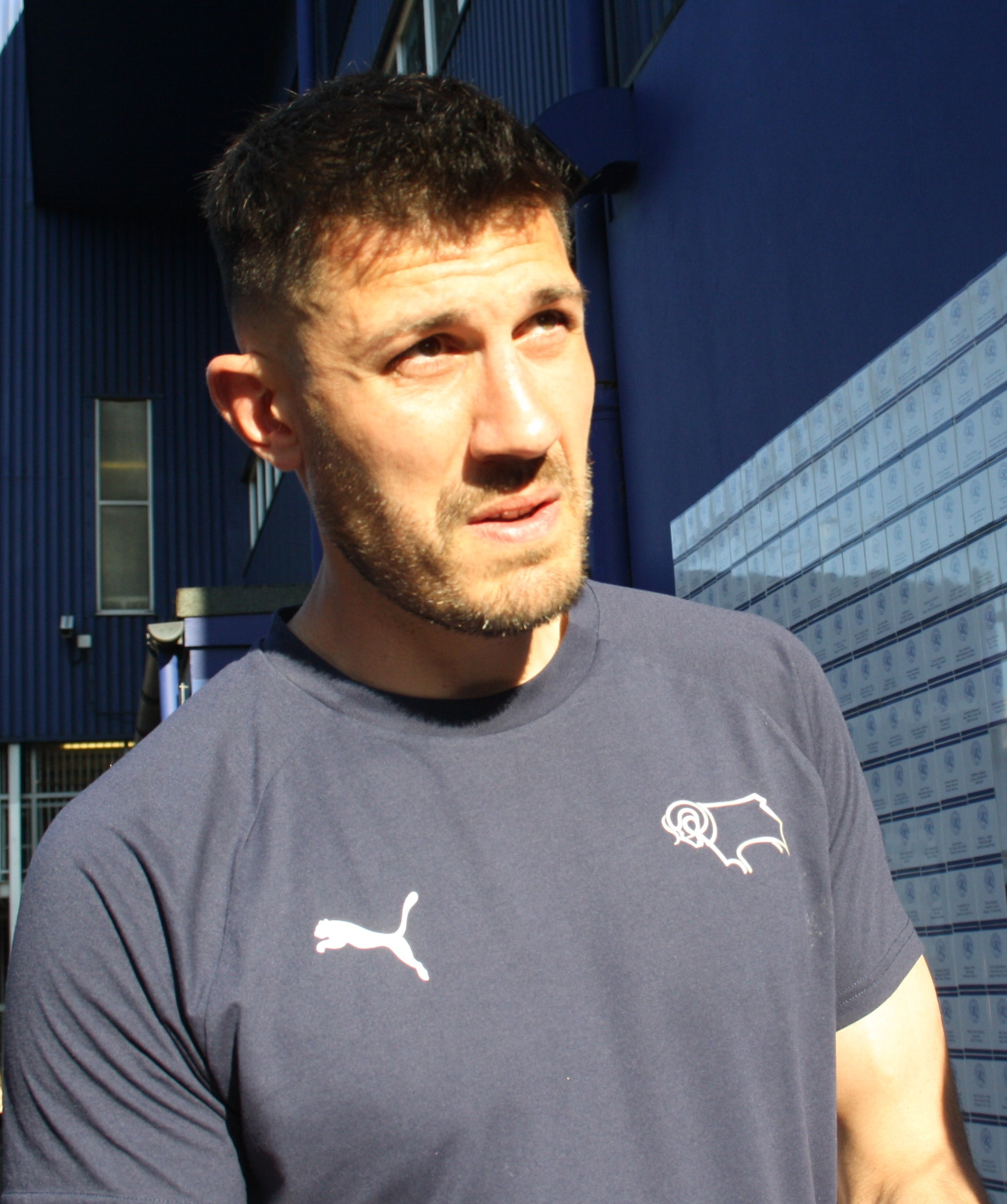
- Batth with Derby County in 2026

Personal information
- Full name: Daniel Tanveer Batth
- Date of birth: 21 September 1990 (age 36)
- Place of birth: Brierley Hill, England
- Height: 6 ft 3 in (1.91 m)
- Position: Centre-back

Team information
- Current team: Millwall
- Number: 23

Youth career
- 2000–2009: Wolverhampton Wanderers

Senior career*
Years	Team	Apps	(Gls)
2009–2019	Wolverhampton Wanderers	195	(14)
2009–2010	→ Colchester United (loan)	17	(1)
2010	→ Sheffield United (loan)	1	(0)
2011	→ Sheffield Wednesday (loan)	10	(0)
2011–2012	→ Sheffield Wednesday (loan)	44	(2)
2018–2019	→ Middlesbrough (loan)	10	(0)
2019–2022	Stoke City	100	(5)
2022–2023	Sunderland	49	(1)
2023–2024	Norwich City	16	(1)
2024–2025	Blackburn Rovers	37	(2)
2025–2026	Derby County	10	(0)
2026–	Millwall	0	(0)
- * Club domestic league appearances and goals as of 16:05, 25 April 2026 (UTC)

Daniel Tanveer Batth (born 21 September 1990) is an English professional footballer who plays as a centre-back for EFL Championship club Millwall.

Batth began his career with his local side Wolverhampton Wanderers, joining their youth academy as a teenager. In order to gain first-team experience he spent time out on loan at Colchester United, Sheffield United and Sheffield Wednesday (twice). He broke into Wolves' first team in the 2012–13 season, and was made captain by Kenny Jackett for the 2013–14 season as Wolves won the League One title, with Batth being named in the PFA Team of the Year.

Batth remained a key member of the Wolves team as the play-offs were narrowly missed in 2014–15 before promotion to the Premier League was gained in 2017–18. After being omitted from Nuno Espírito Santo's Premier League squad, Batth joined Middlesbrough on loan in August 2018. He moved to Stoke City in January 2019 for a fee of £3 million. He spent three years at Stoke, making 107 appearances, before joining Sunderland in January 2022, after 18 months at Sunderland Batth joined Norwich City in September 2023, where he spent a season. In August 2024, he signed for Blackburn Rovers; where he stayed for the duration of the 2024–25 season. In July 2025, Batth signed with Derby County; where he stayed for the duration of the 2025–26 season. In August 2026, Batth signed with Millwall.

== Club career ==
=== Wolverhampton Wanderers ===
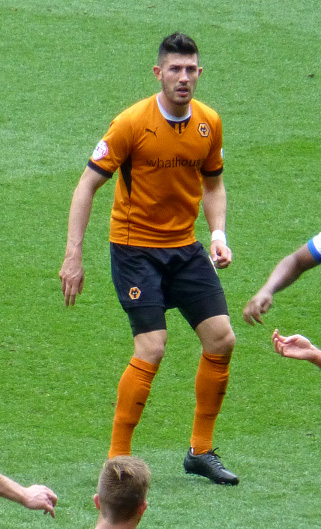
Batth playing for Wolves in 2014

==== Early career ====
Born in Brierley Hill, West Midlands, Batth joined the Wolverhampton Wanderers Academy at the age of 15. He attended Thorns Community College. He captained the youth team and overcame a dislocated shoulder in his reserve team debut, aged 16. He was one of seven academy graduates to sign a professional deal at the end of the 2008–09 season.

==== Loan to Colchester United ====
Batth had his first taste of first-team football when he was signed by Aidy Boothroyd for League One club Colchester United on loan on 17 September 2009. He made his Football League and professional debut two days later, starting in central defence alongside Magnus Okuonghae in a 2–0 win over Hartlepool United and earning the man of the match award. After making five starts during his first month with the club, his loan was extended until the end of the season at the Colchester Community Stadium.

On 20 February 2010, Batth scored his first professional goal with a header from a David Prutton corner to secure a 1–0 victory against Oldham Athletic. Batth made 17 league starts for Colchester and made one substitute appearance, scoring one goal. Colchester occupied a play-off position during a large part of Batth's spell.

==== Loan to Sheffield United ====
On his return to Molineux, Batth was named "Young Professional of the Year" at the club's end of season dinner. Following this, he made his competitive debut for Wolves in a League Cup extra time home win at the expense of Southend United on 24 August 2010. Three months later, he joined Sheffield United on loan for one month, where he would make just a single substitute league appearance before being recalled to Wolves' Premier League squad for games against Liverpool, West Ham United and Manchester City, where he was a substitute.

==== Loan to Sheffield Wednesday ====
Batth then went out on loan once again to Sheffield, only this time to arch-rivals Sheffield Wednesday. He joined the Owls on 16 March 2011 until the end of the season. His spell ended having made ten league appearances for the club.

Having impressed at Sheffield Wednesday during his loan stint the previous season, the club moved to re-sign him on loan once again, agreeing another six-month spell on 26 July 2011. In December 2011, the loan was extended to the end of the season, as the Owls challenged for promotion to the Championship. He scored in a 2–0 away win at Preston North End on New Year's Eve 2011, and a second league goal on 10 March 2012 in a 3–0 win against Bournemouth at Hillsborough. Batth finished his second stay at Sheffield Wednesday having totalled 49 appearances in all competitions, and having been part of their promotion as League One runners-up.

==== Return to Wolverhampton Wanderers ====
Batth began the 2012–13 season back at Wolves, with Sheffield Wednesday manager Dave Jones ruling out a return for the defender. Back in Wolves' colours, he scored the opening goal in a League Cup defeat of Northampton Town on 30 August 2012, and then scored his first league goal for Wolves with a late equaliser in a 2–2 draw with Leeds United on 9 February 2013. In his first full season in the Wolves first-team, Batth accumulated twelve league and two cup appearances in addition to his two goals. The club were however relegated from the Championship at the end of the campaign and took up the option on Batth's contract of an additional year.

Following Wolves' relegation to League One, the club installed Kenny Jackett as head coach for the 2013–14 season. One of his first acts as manager was to give Batth the vice-captaincy at the club. Wolves enjoyed a hugely successful season and gained automatic promotion back to the Championship with four games to spare. Batth was the only ever-present in the promotion-winning side, playing all 46 league games in a season where Wolves won the League One title with a division record of 103 points. In January 2014 he signed a long-term deal with the club that ran until summer 2017. Batth was also named in the PFA League One Team of the Year.

The 2014–15 season was Batth's first as a regular in the Championship. He remained as the only ever-present since Jackett's arrival, playing in every game of a side that had won 50 out of 86 games. Wolves got off to a positive start, maintaining a play-off position until mid-November as Batth formed a solid partnership with Richard Stearman. The club held the best defensive record in the league for the majority of the season, keeping 15 clean sheets along the way. In December 2014, Batth scored an 88th-minute equaliser for Wolves in a 1–1 draw against Brighton & Hove Albion at Molineux. A string of commanding performances led to rumours of interest from local rivals Aston Villa. Wolves continued to be in the hunt for the play-offs with two games to play of the season but missed out on goals scored to Ipswich Town. On 23 April it was revealed that Batth was facing a three-month layoff due to a stress fracture to his foot. Batth played 39 times for Wolves in 2015–16 as they finished in 14th position.

Batth scored in a 3–1 win against rivals Birmingham City on 20 August 2016. On 22 September 2016, the day after his 26th birthday, he signed a new four-year contract with Wolves to potentially tie him to the club until summer 2020. On 1 April 2017, Batth scored twice against Cardiff City moving Wolves eight points clear of the relegation zone. He scored in the final match of the 2016–17 season, a 1–0 win against Preston North End which secured 15th place for Wolves. Portuguese manager Nuno Espírito Santo was appointed ahead of the 2017–18 campaign which proved a very successful one for Wolves as they won the Championship title with 99 points.

==== Loan to Middlesbrough ====
On 31 August 2018, Batth returned to the Championship, after joining Middlesbrough on a season-long loan deal, after falling out of favour with Wolves, after they had been promoted to the Premier League. Batth made 13 appearances under Tony Pulis at Middlesbrough before his loan was cut short in January 2019.

=== Stoke City ===
Batth joined Stoke City on 29 January 2019 on a three-and-a-half-year contract for a fee understood to be an initial £3 million. Batth made his Stoke debut on 2 February 2019 against Hull City and was given the captain's armband by Nathan Jones in the absence of Ryan Shawcross. Batth played 17 times in the remainder of the 2018–19 season as Stoke finished in 16th place. Batth helped improve the Potters defence with the side keeping eight clean sheets.

Batth scored his first goal for Stoke in an EFL Cup tie against Leeds United on 27 August 2019. Stoke made a poor start to the 2019–20 season failing to win any of the first ten matches under Jones. Speaking in May 2020 Batth said he believed that Stoke made such a poor start because Jones brought in too many new players. Jones was replaced by Michael O'Neill in November and results began to improve. Batth scored in three of the final four matches as Stoke gained ten points to avoid relegation and finish in 15th position. In the 2020–21 season, Batth made 32 appearances as Stoke finished in 14th position.

=== Sunderland ===
On 18 January 2022, Batth joined League One side Sunderland on a free transfer, signing an eighteen-month deal. He scored his first goal for Sunderland against Cambridge United on 23 April 2022.

=== Norwich City ===
Batth joined Norwich City on a one-year contract in September 2023.

=== Blackburn Rovers ===
On 1 August 2024, Batth joined Blackburn Rovers on a one-year deal having almost joined the club the previous summer.

On 19 May 2025, the club announced it had offered the player a new contract.

=== Derby County ===
On 1 July 2025, Batth joined Championship side Derby County on a one-year deal. On 9 August 2025, Batth made his debut for Derby in a 3–1 league defeat at Stoke City. Batth was mainly used as a bit-part player during the 2025–26 season, making 12 appearances.

On 15 May 2026, it was announced that Batth was "in discussion about his future" at Derby County with his contract expiring in June 2026.

On 1 July 2026, it was announced the Batth had left Derby County after a failure to agree new terms between the two parties.

=== Millwall ===
On 2 August 2026, Batth signed a one-year contract with fellow Championship club Millwall.

== International career ==
While never representing England at any level, Batth is technically eligible to play for India through his father. However, he was left frustrated by Indian residency rules and passport regulations in July 2017, and has yet to play for the country.

== Personal life ==
Batth is of mixed English and Punjabi descent (Batth also holds an Overseas Citizenship of India). Batth set up his own charity in August 2017, Foundation DB, with his partner Natalie Ann Cutler, to raise money to combat homelessness in Wolverhampton.

== Career statistics ==
As of match played 25 April 2026

Appearances and goals by club, season and competition
Club	Season	League			FA Cup		League Cup		Other		Total	
Club	Season	Division	Apps	Goals	Apps	Goals	Apps	Goals	Apps	Goals	Apps	Goals
Wolverhampton Wanderers	2009–10	Premier League	0	0	0	0	0	0	—		0	0
Wolverhampton Wanderers	2010–11	Premier League	0	0	0	0	1	0	—		1	0
Wolverhampton Wanderers	2012–13	Championship	12	1	0	0	2	1	—		14	2
Wolverhampton Wanderers	2013–14	League One	46	2	2	0	1	0	1 (Note: Appearances in Football League Trophy)	0	50	2
Wolverhampton Wanderers	2014–15	Championship	44	4	2	0	0	0	—		46	4
Wolverhampton Wanderers	2015–16	Championship	38	2	1	0	0	0	—		39	2
Wolverhampton Wanderers	2016–17	Championship	39	3	1	0	1	0	—		41	3
Wolverhampton Wanderers	2017–18	Championship	16	1	1	0	4	1	—		21	2
Wolverhampton Wanderers	2018–19	Premier League	0	0	0	0	0	0	—		0	0
Wolverhampton Wanderers	Total		195	14	7	0	9	2	1	0	212	16
Colchester United (loan)	2009–10	League One	17	1	1	0	0	0	—		18	1
Sheffield United (loan)	2010–11	Championship	1	0	0	0	0	0	0	0	1	0
Sheffield Wednesday (loan)	2010–11	League One	10	0	0	0	0	0	0	0	10	0
Sheffield Wednesday (loan)	2011–12	League One	44	2	4	0	1	0	0	0	49	3
Sheffield Wednesday (loan)	Total		54	2	4	0	1	0	0	0	59	2
Middlesbrough (loan)	2018–19	Championship	10	0	0	0	3	0	—		13	0
Stoke City	2018–19	Championship	17	0	0	0	0	0	—		17	0
Stoke City	2019–20	Championship	43	4	0	0	2	1	—		45	5
Stoke City	2020–21	Championship	29	1	1	0	2	0	—		32	1
Stoke City	2021–22	Championship	11	0	0	0	2	0	—		13	0
Stoke City	Total		100	5	1	0	6	1	—		107	6
Sunderland	2021–22	League One	9	1	0	0	0	0	3 (Note: Appearances in EFL League One play-offs)	0	12	1
Sunderland	2022–23	Championship	40	0	2	0	0	0	0	0	42	0
Sunderland	2023–24	Championship	0	0	0	0	1	0	—		1	0
Sunderland	Total		49	1	2	0	1	0	3	0	55	1
Norwich City	2023–24	Championship	16	1	2	0	0	0	0	0	18	1
Blackburn Rovers	2024–25	Championship	37	2	2	0	2	0	—		41	2
Derby County	2025–26	Championship	10	0	1	0	1	0	—		12	0
Millwall	2026–27	Championship	0	0	0	0	0	0	—		0	0
Career total			489	26	20	0	23	3	4	0	527	29

== Honours ==
Sheffield Wednesday

- Football League One second-place promotion: 2011–12

Wolverhampton Wanderers

- EFL Championship: 2017–18
- Football League One: 2013–14

Sunderland

- EFL League One play-offs: 2022

Individual

- Wolverhampton Wanderers Young Player of the Season: 2009–10
- Football League One Team of the Season: 2013–14
- PFA Team of the Year: 2013–14 League One
- Sunderland Player of the Year: 2022–23

== See also ==
- List of Sikh footballers
