= Richard Stearman =

English footballer

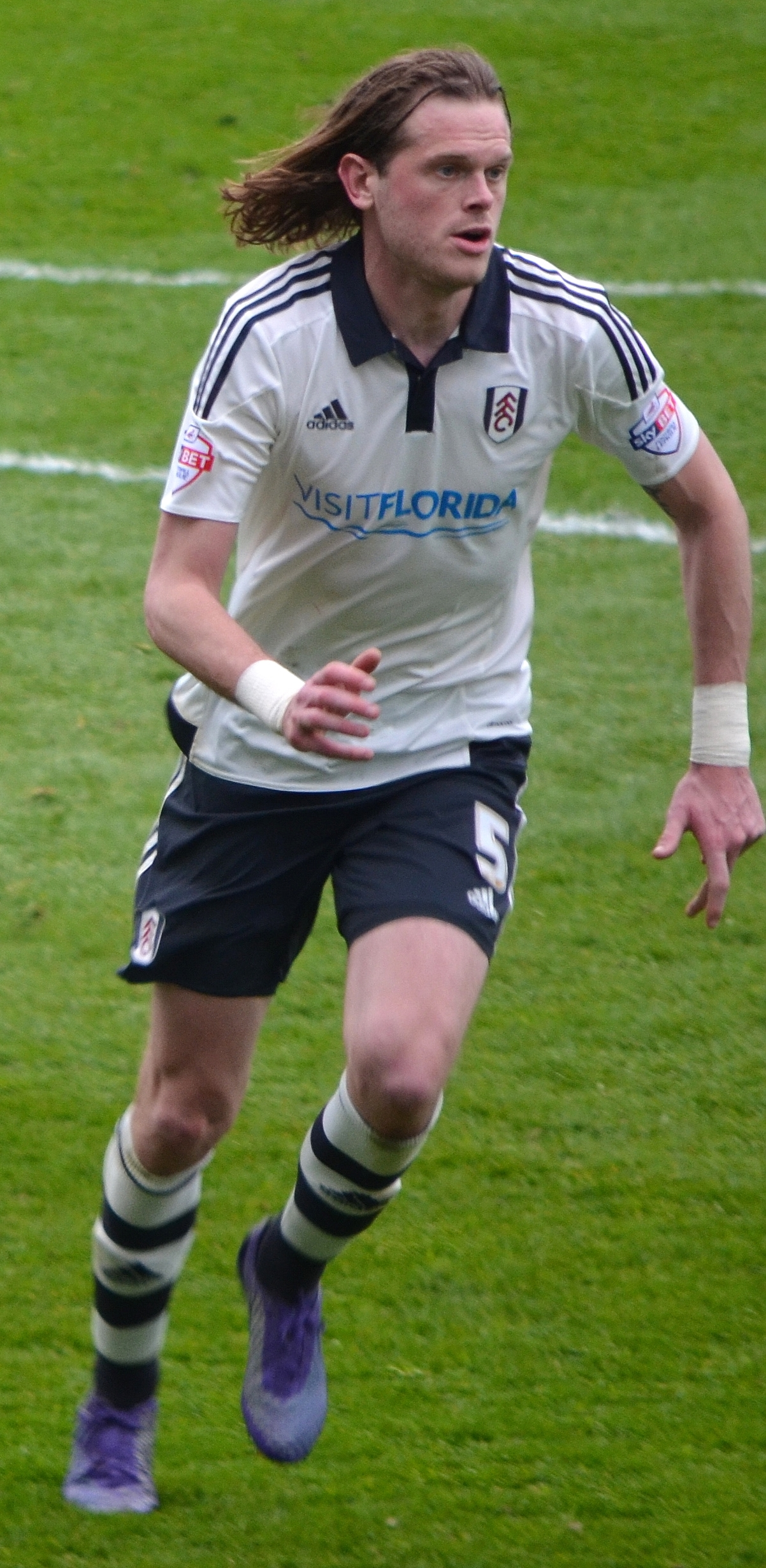
- Stearman playing for Fulham in 2016

Personal information
- Full name: Richard James Michael Stearman
- Date of birth: 19 August 1987 (age 39)
- Place of birth: Wolverhampton, England
- Height: 6 ft 3 in (1.91 m)
- Position: Defender

Team information
- Current team: Wolverhampton Wanderers U18 (assistant coach)

Youth career
- 1998–2004: Leicester City

Senior career*
| Years | Team | Apps | (Gls) |
| 2004–2008 | Leicester City | 116 | (7) |
| 2008–2015 | Wolverhampton Wanderers | 211 | (5) |
| 2013 | → Ipswich Town (loan) | 15 | (0) |
| 2015–2017 | Fulham | 29 | (0) |
| 2016–2017 | → Wolverhampton Wanderers (loan) | 18 | (1) |
| 2017–2020 | Sheffield United | 44 | (3) |
| 2020–2021 | Huddersfield Town | 38 | (0) |
| 2021–2023 | Derby County | 24 | (0) |
| 2023–2024 | Solihull Moors | 26 | (0) |
| Total | | 521 | (15) |

International career
| 2003 | England U16 | 3 | (0) |
| 2004 | England U17 | 9 | (0) |
| 2005 | England U19 | 1 | (0) |
| 2008–2009 | England U21 | 4 | (0) |
Medal record
Men's football
Representing England
UEFA European Under-21 Championship
| Runner-up | 2009 Sweden |
- * Club domestic league appearances and goals

Richard James Michael Stearman (born 19 August 1987) is an English former professional footballer who is assistant coach at Wolverhampton Wanderers U18. He was a versatile defender, being able to play in any defensive slot although primarily a centre half or right-back. He spent majority of his career at Leicester City and Wolverhampton Wanderers.

His career started at Leicester City, joining the academy in 1998, before turning professional in 2004, making his senior debut in the same year. He then joined Wolverhampton Wanderers in 2008, where he would stay for seven years, with a loan spell at Ipswich Town in 2013.

He joined Fulham in 2015, staying there until 2017, he also had a loan spell back at Wolverhampton Wanderers during the 2016–17 season. Stearman then joined Sheffield United in 2017, in January 2020 after being released by United, Stearman joined Huddersfield Town where he stayed until June 2021. In August 2021 Stearman joined Derby County where he would stay for two years before being released in May 2023. In August 2023 Stearman joined Solihull Moors and was released in May 2024.

== Club career ==
=== Leicester City ===
Stearman was born in Wolverhampton, West Midlands, and raised in Leicestershire. He joined the Leicester City youth academy in 1998 having been spotted playing for his local side Harborough Town. Equally adept at playing at right-back or centre-back, he signed his first professional contract in 2004, shortly after having won Leicester's Young Player of the Year award in 2003–04.

Stearman made his senior debut, aged 17, on 30 October 2004 in a goalless draw at Cardiff City. He scored his first senior goal in Leicester's 3–1 home victory over Millwall on 2 April 2005 and finished his first season with eight appearances. He became a first team regular in 2005–06, and attracted a bid from Sunderland, rejected by then-manager Rob Kelly, who said he was unwilling to part with one of his players he considered a hot prospect. He remained with the club for two more seasons, and won both Player of the Year and Player's Player of the Year awards in 2007–08.

=== Wolverhampton Wanderers ===
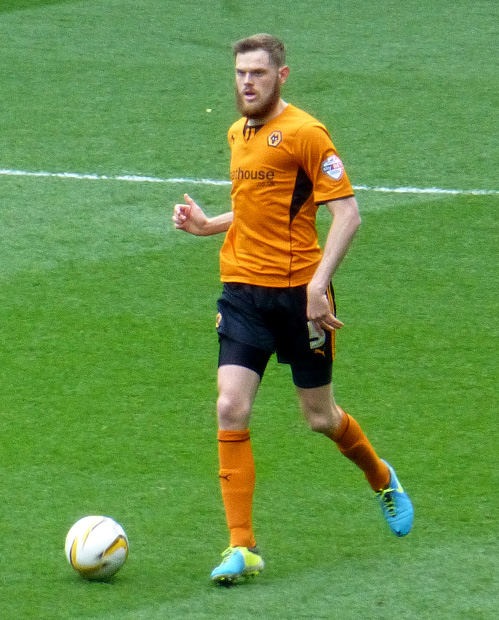
Stearman playing for Wolverhampton Wanderers in 2014

After Leicester were relegated to League One, Stearman signed for Championship side Wolverhampton Wanderers on 25 June 2008 in a four-year deal. He made his debut for Wolves in a 2–2 draw at Plymouth Argyle on 9 August 2008. Towards the latter end of 2008 saw Stearman partnering England under-21s teammate Michael Mancienne in defence. On 3 May, he scored his first goal for the club, an injury time winner against Doncaster Rovers, and received a championship winners medal. Stearman was also named in the PFA 2009 Championship team of the year alongside Michael Kightly and Sylvan Ebanks-Blake, voted for by his fellow professionals.

With regular right back Kevin Foley out injured, Stearman had an extended run in the starting eleven early in their Premier League return in 2009–10, during which he scored his first and only top flight goal, against Hull City. He featured throughout the first half of the season, but after being sent off against Wigan in January 2011 he made only one further substitute appearance during the campaign.

Stearman started 27 Premier League games – primarily replacing Jody Craddock at centre back – during the following season as the club avoided relegation on the final day. He made another 28 starts during the 2011–12 season despite suffering a broken wrist, but the team were ultimately relegated back to the Championship

Back in the Championship, Stearman fell out of favour at Wolves, and in January 2013 he moved on loan to Ipswich Town for the remainder of the current season, where he was reunited with his former Wolves manager Mick McCarthy.

Stearman returned to Wolves' first team in the 2013–14 season, with the team now in League One and under the management of Kenny Jackett. He was a regular in the side that won the League One title and during the summer signing a new contract that was to last until summer 2016. He remained a regular at the heart of Wolves' defence during the 2014–15 season as the club missed the play-offs on goal difference. His performances earned him both Fans' Player of the Year and Players' Player of the Year Awards.

The following season began with Stearman captaining the team in the absence of the injured Danny Batth but after only four league games, Wolves coach Kenny Jackett confirmed reports that Wolves had accepted an offer from Fulham for Stearman and he would be leaving Molineux. Although officially undisclosed, media reports placed the accepted bid at £2 million. Stearman departed having made a total of 234 appearances (scoring six times) for the club in three different divisions.

=== Fulham ===
On 1 September 2015, Stearman moved to another Championship club, signing a three-year deal (with the option of an additional year) with Fulham. He made 29 league appearances for the club during the 2015–16 season but at the start of the following campaign was not used in the opening league matches.

On 31 August 2016, less than a year after departing Wolves, he rejoined them on a season-long loan. On 28 January 2017, he scored his only goal on that spell against Liverpool in the FA Cup 4th round, scoring in the first minute of a 2–1 victory.

=== Sheffield United ===
On 6 July 2017, it was announced that Stearman had signed for Sheffield United for an undisclosed fee. He helped United to promotion to the Premier League on 28 April 2019.

=== Huddersfield Town ===
After being released by Sheffield United, Stearman signed an 18-month contract with Huddersfield Town on 10 January 2020.

=== Derby County ===
On 6 August 2021, Stearman signed a one-year contract with Derby County following a trial period with the club. On 8 July 2022, Stearman extended his time at Derby by a further year until 2023. Stearman was released by Derby on 10 May 2023 after 31 appearances over two seasons.

=== Solihull Moors ===
On 3 August 2023, Stearman joined Solihull Moors of the National League on one-year contract.

In July 2024, Stearman announced his retirement from football.

== International career ==
Stearman has represented England at Under-17 level in the 2004 European Championships and also at the Under-18 level. He was first called up by the England under-21 squad in November 2007 for the 2009 European Championship qualifiers, however he was an unused substitute in the games. He later received a second call-up from the under-21s when he was selected for a European Championship qualifier against Portugal in September 2008. However, he was again an unused substitute in the game, and again in the qualifying play-offs against Wales in October 2008.

Stearman made his debut in a 2–0 friendly win over the Czech Republic under-21s on 18 November 2008, and a 3–2 defeat to Ecuador on 11 February 2009. Stuart Pearce included him in the squad for the 2009 UEFA U21 championships when centre half and captain Steven Taylor withdrew due to injury.

On 12 March 2011, the Football Association of Ireland confirmed that they had contacted Stearman to play for the Republic of Ireland as he has an Irish grandparent on his mother's side of the family. In November 2012, Stephen Hunt said that Stearman had acquired an Irish passport.

== Coaching career ==
Following his retirement in July 2024, Stearman remained with National League side Solihull Moors as first-team coach.

On 26 March 2025, Stearman joined Championship side Swansea City as assistant coach until the end of the season.

On 22 October 2026, Stearman was appointed as assistant coach for Wolverhampton Wanderers U18's.

== Career statistics ==
As of match played 8 January 2023

Appearances and goals by club, season and competition
| Club | Season | League | | | FA Cup | | League Cup | | Other | | Total | |
| Club | Season | Division | Apps | Goals | Apps | Goals | Apps | Goals | Apps | Goals | Apps | Goals |
|---|---|---|---|---|---|---|---|---|---|---|---|---|
| Leicester City | 2004–05 | Championship | 8 | 1 | 0 | 0 | 0 | 0 | — | | 8 | 1 |
| Leicester City | 2005–06 | Championship | 34 | 3 | 2 | 0 | 3 | 1 | — | | 39 | 4 |
| Leicester City | 2006–07 | Championship | 35 | 1 | 1 | 0 | 3 | 2 | — | | 39 | 3 |
| Leicester City | 2007–08 | Championship | 39 | 2 | 1 | 0 | 4 | 1 | — | | 44 | 3 |
| Leicester City | Total | | 116 | 7 | 4 | 0 | 10 | 4 | — | | 130 | 11 |
| Wolverhampton Wanderers | 2008–09 | Championship | 37 | 1 | 1 | 0 | 2 | 0 | — | | 40 | 1 |
| Wolverhampton Wanderers | 2009–10 | Premier League | 16 | 1 | 2 | 0 | 0 | 0 | — | | 18 | 1 |
| Wolverhampton Wanderers | 2010–11 | Premier League | 31 | 0 | 3 | 0 | 2 | 1 | — | | 36 | 1 |
| Wolverhampton Wanderers | 2011–12 | Premier League | 30 | 0 | 2 | 0 | 1 | 0 | — | | 33 | 0 |
| Wolverhampton Wanderers | 2012–13 | Championship | 12 | 1 | 0 | 0 | 3 | 0 | — | | 15 | 1 |
| Wolverhampton Wanderers | 2013–14 | League One | 40 | 2 | 2 | 0 | 0 | 0 | 2 (Note: Appearances in Football League Trophy) | 0 | 44 | 2 |
| Wolverhampton Wanderers | 2014–15 | Championship | 42 | 0 | 2 | 0 | 1 | 0 | — | | 45 | 0 |
| Wolverhampton Wanderers | 2015–16 | Championship | 4 | 0 | 0 | 0 | 0 | 0 | — | | 4 | 0 |
| Wolverhampton Wanderers | Total | | 211 | 5 | 12 | 0 | 9 | 1 | 2 | 0 | 234 | 6 |
| Ipswich Town (loan) | 2012–13 | Championship | 15 | 0 | 0 | 0 | 0 | 0 | — | | 15 | 0 |
| Fulham | 2015–16 | Championship | 29 | 0 | 0 | 0 | 1 | 0 | — | | 30 | 0 |
| Fulham | 2016–17 | Championship | 0 | 0 | 0 | 0 | 2 | 0 | — | | 2 | 0 |
| Fulham | Total | | 29 | 0 | 0 | 0 | 3 | 0 | 0 | 0 | 32 | 0 |
| Wolverhampton Wanderers (loan) | 2016–17 | Championship | 18 | 0 | 1 | 1 | — | | — | | 19 | 1 |
| Sheffield United | 2017–18 | Championship | 28 | 2 | 2 | 0 | 0 | 0 | 0 | 0 | 30 | 2 |
| Sheffield United | 2018–19 | Championship | 16 | 1 | 1 | 0 | 0 | 0 | 0 | 0 | 17 | 1 |
| Sheffield United | 2019–20 | Premier League | 0 | 0 | 1 | 0 | 2 | 1 | 0 | 0 | 3 | 1 |
| Sheffield United | Total | | 44 | 3 | 4 | 0 | 2 | 1 | 0 | 0 | 50 | 4 |
| Huddersfield Town | 2019–20 | Championship | 17 | 0 | 0 | 0 | 0 | 0 | 0 | 0 | 17 | 0 |
| Huddersfield Town | 2020–21 | Championship | 21 | 0 | 0 | 0 | 0 | 0 | 0 | 0 | 21 | 0 |
| Huddersfield Town | Total | | 38 | 0 | 0 | 0 | 0 | 0 | 0 | 0 | 38 | 0 |
| Derby County | 2021–22 | Championship | 14 | 0 | 0 | 0 | 1 | 0 | 0 | 0 | 15 | 0 |
| Derby County | 2022–23 | League One | 10 | 0 | 3 | 0 | 1 | 0 | 2 (Note: Appearances in EFL Trophy) | 0 | 16 | 0 |
| Derby County | Total | | 24 | 0 | 3 | 0 | 2 | 0 | 2 | 0 | 31 | 0 |
| Solihull Moors | 2023–24 | National League | 0 | 0 | 0 | 0 | 0 | 0 | 0 | 0 | 0 | 0 |
| Career totals | | | 585 | 12 | 24 | 0 | 26 | 6 | 4 | 0 | 549 | 18 |

== Honours ==
Wolverhampton Wanderers

- Football League Championship: 2008–09
- Football League One: 2013–14

Sheffield United

- EFL Championship second-place promotion: 2018–19

Solihull Moors

- FA Trophy runner-up: 2023–24

Individual

- Leicester City Player of the Year: 2007–08
- Leicester City Players' Player of the Year: 2007–08
- PFA Team of the Year: 2008–09 Championship
- Wolverhampton Wanderers Player of the Year: 2014–15
