= Lee Evans (footballer) =

Welsh footballer

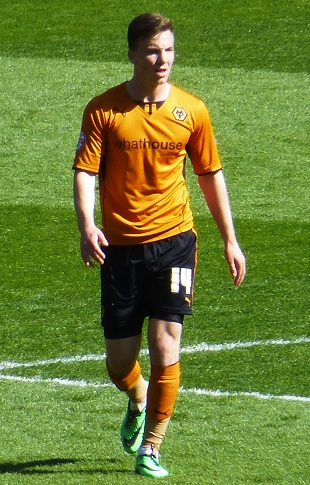
- Evans in 2014

Personal information
- Full name: Lee Evans
- Date of birth: 24 July 1994 (age 32)
- Place of birth: Newport, Wales
- Height: 6 ft 1 in (1.85 m)
- Position: Midfielder

Team information
- Current team: Northampton Town
- Number: 8

Youth career
- Malpas FC
- Bristol Rovers
- 2009–2012: Newport County

Senior career*
Years	Team	Apps	(Gls)
2012–2013	Newport County	25	(3)
2013–2018	Wolverhampton Wanderers	59	(3)
2015–2016	→ Bradford City (loan)	35	(4)
2017–2018	→ Wigan Athletic (loan)	20	(1)
2018–2019	Sheffield United	21	(2)
2018–2019	→ Wigan Athletic (loan)	20	(0)
2019–2021	Wigan Athletic	67	(5)
2021–2024	Ipswich Town	52	(6)
2024	Portsmouth	4	(0)
2024–2026	Blackpool	63	(6)
2026	Bradford City	8	(0)
2026–	Northampton Town	8	(0)

International career^{‡}
2012	Wales Semi-Pro	2	(0)
2013–2016	Wales U21	13	(2)
2017–2019	Wales	4	(0)
- * Club domestic league appearances and goals as of 14:23, 24 October 2026 (UTC) ‡ National team caps and goals as of 21:53, 20 March 2019 (UTC)

Lee Evans (born 24 July 1994) is a Welsh professional footballer who plays as a midfielder for EFL League Two club Northampton Town. He has also played for the Wales national football team.

Evans started his senior career at hometown club Newport County, having previously spent time in the youth systems at Bristol Rovers and Malpas FC. He made his debut for Newport in March 2012 at the age of 17. During his time at Newport, he helped the club to the 2012 FA Trophy Final and promotion to the Football League through the Conference Premier play-offs in 2013. He joined Wolverhampton Wanderers in 2013, making his Football League debut in August 2013. He helped Wolves to win the League One title during his first season at the club in 2013–14. He spent five years at Wolverhampton Wanderers, spending time on loan at Bradford City and Wigan Athletic, helping the later to win the League One title in 2017–18. In January 2018 he joined Sheffield United. He joined former club Wigan Athletic on loan in August 2018, before signing permanently for the club in January 2019. He spent the following three seasons at Wigan before joining Ipswich Town in June 2021. On 1 March 2024, he signed for Portsmouth of League One on a deal until the end of the season. He made his debut for Portsmouth on 29 March 2024, coming off the bench in a 3-1 win for Pompey away at Wycombe Wanderers.

He featured for Wales at Semi-Pro level in 2012, whilst also winning caps for the Wales U21 team between 2013 and 2016. In November 2017, Evans made his debut for the senior Wales national team.

== Club career ==
=== Newport County ===
Having been released by Bristol Rovers as a 15-year-old, Evans began his professional career at his hometown club Newport County, for whom he made his senior league debut aged 17 on 20 March 2012 in a 1–1 draw at Cambridge United. After only three Conference Premier appearances, he ended the season playing in the FA Trophy Final on 12 May at Wembley Stadium, where Newport lost 0–2 to York City.

During the following season, in which the club regained its Football League status after a 25-year absence, Evans became a regular starting player in the Newport team, making 25 appearances in all competitions, scoring three goals.

=== Wolverhampton Wanderers ===
In January 2013, Evans signed a 2 1/2-year deal with Wolverhampton Wanderers, then of the Championship, for an undisclosed transfer fee, reported to be £200,000. Having spent the remainder of the 2012–13 season that saw Wolves relegated to League One as part of their youth development squad, he was identified over the summer by new manager Kenny Jackett to become part of his plans for the first-team.

The midfielder made his club and Football League debut on 3 August 2013 in a goalless draw against Preston North End. He scored his first goal for the club a week later when he netted in a 4–0 win against Gillingham. He made 28 appearances during his first full season at Wolves, helping the team on to win the 2013–14 Football League One title.

He continued to feature for the Wolverhampton Wanderers first-team following promotion to the Championship. He made his Championship debut on the opening day of the season, starting in a 1–0 win against Norwich City. He scored his first goal of the season on 28 September in a 3–3 draw with Reading. Evans made 21 appearances during the 2014–15 season, scoring once.

After returning from his loan spell at Bradford City, Evans featured for Wolves during the 2016–17 season, making 18 appearances in all competitions over the course of the season. In February 2017, he signed a three-and-a-half-year contract extension at Molineux until 2020.

==== Bradford City (loan) ====
On 20 August 2015, Evans signed for Bradford City on loan from Wolves, initially until 9 January 2016. He made his debut for Bradford in a goalless draw with Barnsley on 22 August 2015. He scored his first goal for the club on 3 October, netting the opening goal in a 3–1 away win against Rochdale. In January, Evans' loan at Bradford was extended until the end of the season. He scored four goals in 41 appearances in all competitions and helped Bradford to reach the League One play-offs following a fifth-placed finish.

==== Wigan Athletic (loan) ====
On 31 July 2017, Evans completed a season-long loan to League One side Wigan Athletic. He made his debut for Wigan on the opening day of the season in a 1–0 win against Milton Keynes Dons. He scored his first goal for Wigan in a 4–1 win against Bury on 13 August 2017. He went on to make 23 appearances and score 3 goals before being recalled from his loan spell by his parent club Wolverhampton Wanderers at the beginning of the January transfer window.

=== Sheffield United ===
On 10 January 2018, Evans joined Championship club Sheffield United for an undisclosed fee, reported to be around £750,000. He made his debut for Sheffield United on 20 January in a 2–1 win against Norwich City. He scored his first goals for the club on 10 April, netting a brace in a 2–1 win against Middlesbrough. He made 19 appearances for Sheffield United during the second-half of the 2017–18 season, scoring twice.

=== Return to Wigan Athletic ===
On 10 August 2018, Evans joined fellow Championship club Wigan Athletic on loan. He featured regularly for Wigan during the first-half of the season, making 20 appearances before signing permanently for the club on 1 January 2019. He made a total of 35 appearances for Wigan during the 2018–19 season, scoring once.

Evans continued to feature as a first-team regular during the 2019–20 season, scoring his first goal of the season on the opening day of the campaign, the winner in a 3–2 home win against Cardiff City. He scored two goals in 33 appearances for Wigan throughout the course of the season, as the club suffered relegation to League One due to a points deduction, despite a mid-table league finish in the regular season.

Following Wigan's relegation to League One, the club was placed into administration. Despite this, Evans was one of the few senior players to remain at the Wigan. He started the season as a regular in the first-team, before suffering a knee injury in December which required surgery. He returned from injury in March, going on to score two goals in 24 appearances over the course of the season to help Wigan avoid relegation.

=== Ipswich Town ===
On 4 June 2021, Evans joined Ipswich Town on a three-year deal, reuniting with his former manager Paul Cook. He made his debut for Ipswich on the opening day of the 2021–22 season in a 2–2 home draw against Morecambe at Portman Road. On 28 September 2021, Evans scored his first career hat-trick in a 6–0 home win against Doncaster Rovers. He captained Ipswich during the early months of the season, before his former teammate Sam Morsy took the armband full-time after being named as club captain in October. Evans departed on 2 February 2024.

=== Portsmouth ===
On 1 March 2024, Evans joined Portsmouth on a deal until the end of the season. On 1 May 2024, the club said he would be released in the summer, when his contract expired.

=== Blackpool ===
On 8 July 2024, Evans joined League One side Blackpool on a two-year contract. He scored his first goal for the club on 13 August 2024, the final goal in a 4–0 victory at Burton Albion in the EFL Cup.

=== Return to Bradford City ===
Evans joined Bradford City on 2 February 2026 for an undisclosed fee. He was released by Bradford City at the end of the 2025–26 season.

=== Northampton Town ===
On 7 August 2026, Evans joined League Two side Northampton on an initial one year contract.

== International career ==
Having previously played two matches for the Wales Semi-pro team in 2012, Evans made his debut for the Wales under-21 team on 6 September 2013 against San Marino. On 5 September 2014, Evans scored his first goal for Wales under-21 in a 2–2 draw with Finland.

On 1 October 2014 Evans received his first call-up to the Wales senior national team along with five other uncapped players. He made his senior debut for Wales on 14 November 2017 as a second-half substitute during a 1–1 draw with Panama at the Cardiff City Stadium. He made his first start for Wales on 20 March 2019 in a 1–0 win against Trinidad and Tobago at the Racecourse Ground.

== Career statistics ==
=== Club ===
As of match played 24 October 2026

Appearances and goals by club, season and competition
Club	Season	League			FA Cup		League Cup		Other		Total	
Club	Season	Division	Apps	Goals	Apps	Goals	Apps	Goals	Apps	Goals	Apps	Goals
Newport County	2011–12	Conference Premier	3	0	0	0	–		3 (Note: One appearance in FA Trophy, two appearances in Welsh Cup)	0	6	0
Newport County	2012–13	Conference Premier	22	3	2	0	–		1 (Note: Appearance in FA Trophy)	0	25	3
Newport County	Total		25	3	2	0	0	0	4	0	31	3
Wolverhampton Wanderers	2013–14	League One	26	2	1	0	1	0	0	0	28	2
Wolverhampton Wanderers	2014–15	Championship	18	1	2	0	1	0	–		21	1
Wolverhampton Wanderers	2015–16	Championship	0	0	0	0	0	0	–		0	0
Wolverhampton Wanderers	2016–17	Championship	15	0	2	0	1	0	–		18	0
Wolverhampton Wanderers	2017–18	Championship	0	0	0	0	0	0	–		0	0
Wolverhampton Wanderers	Total		59	3	5	0	3	0	0	0	67	3
Bradford City (loan)	2015–16	League One	35	4	3	0	0	0	3 (Note: One appearance in Football League Trophy, two appearances in League One play-offs)	0	41	4
Wigan Athletic (loan)	2017–18	League One	20	1	2	1	0	0	1 (Note: Appearance(s) in EFL Trophy)	1	23	3
Sheffield United	2017–18	Championship	19	2	0	0	0	0	–		19	2
Sheffield United	2018–19	Championship	2	0	0	0	0	0	–		2	0
Sheffield United	Total		21	2	0	0	0	0	0	0	21	2
Wigan Athletic (loan)	2018–19	Championship	20	0	0	0	0	0	–		20	0
Wigan Athletic	2018–19	Championship	14	1	1	0	0	0	–		15	1
Wigan Athletic	2019–20	Championship	32	2	1	0	0	0	–		33	2
Wigan Athletic	2020–21	League One	21	2	0	0	1	0	2	0	24	2
Wigan Athletic	Total		87	5	2	0	1	0	2	0	92	5
Ipswich Town	2021–22	League One	27	3	1	0	0	0	1	0	29	3
Ipswich Town	2022–23	League One	23	3	2	0	1	0	1	0	27	3
Ipswich Town	2023–24	Championship	2	0	0	0	3	0	–		5	0
Ipswich Town	Total		52	6	3	0	4	0	2	0	61	6
Portsmouth	2023–24	League One	4	0	0	0	0	0	0	0	4	0
Blackpool	2024–25	League One	42	4	1	0	2	1	0	0	45	5
Blackpool	2025–26	League One	24	2	3	0	1	0	3	0	31	2
Blackpool	Total		66	6	4	0	3	1	3	0	76	7
Bradford City	2025–26	League One	8	0	0	0	0	0	0	0	8	0
Northampton Town	2026–27	League Two	8	0	0	0	1	0	1	0	10	0
Career total			385	30	21	1	12	1	16	1	434	33

== Honours ==
Newport County

- FA Trophy runner-up: 2011–12

Wolverhampton Wanderers

- Football League One: 2013–14

Wigan Athletic

- EFL League One: 2017–18

Ipswich Town

- EFL League One second-place promotion: 2022–23
