= Bakary Sako =

Malian footballer (born 1988)

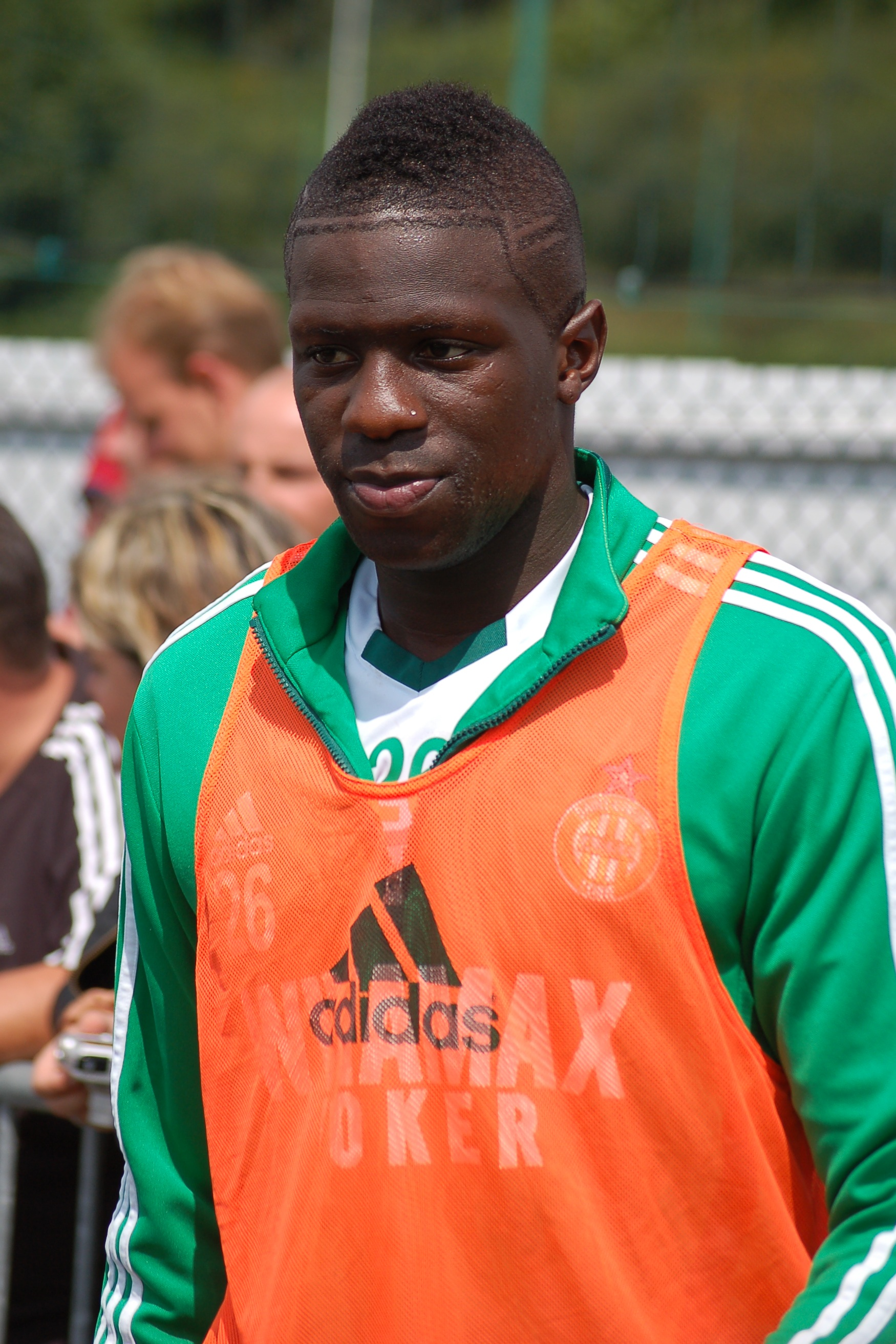
- Sako with Saint-Étienne in 2011

Personal information
- Full name: Bakary Sako
- Date of birth: 26 April 1988 (age 38)
- Place of birth: Ivry-sur-Seine, France
- Height: 1.83 m (6 ft 0 in)
- Positions: Winger; forward

Team information
- Current team: Châteauroux
- Number: 26

Youth career
- 1996–2000: Vitry CA
- 2000–2002: US Ivry
- 2002–2006: Châteauroux

Senior career*
Years	Team	Apps	(Gls)
2006–2009	Châteauroux	68	(9)
2009–2012	Saint-Étienne	106	(12)
2012–2015	Wolverhampton Wanderers	118	(36)
2015–2018	Crystal Palace	43	(5)
2018–2019	West Bromwich Albion	5	(0)
2019	Crystal Palace	4	(0)
2019–2020	Pafos	6	(1)
2021–2022	Saint-Étienne	7	(0)
2022–2023	Levadiakos	9	(0)
2024–2025	FC 93	3	(1)
2025–	Châteauroux	5	(0)

International career
2005	Mali U17	1	(0)
2009–2010	France U21	11	(2)
2014–2017	Mali	21	(9)
- * Club domestic league appearances and goals as of 23 June 2026

Bakary Sako (born 26 April 1988) is a professional footballer who plays as a midfielder for French Championnat National 1 club Châteauroux. He has previously played for English League clubs Crystal Palace, Wolverhampton Wanderers, and West Bromwich Albion. From 2014 to 2017, he played for the Mali national team.

== Club career ==
=== Early years ===
Sako had been with Châteauroux since 2001, joining the club as an academy player. He made his league debut on the final matchday of the 2005–06 Ligue 2 season coming on as a half-time substitute in a 4–1 victory over Bastia. Following the season, he signed his first professional contract after agreeing to a three-year deal. He was promoted to the senior squad and assigned the number 26 shirt.

During the next two seasons, Sako was limited to mostly substitute appearances. He did score his first league goal, during the 2007–08 season, in a 1–2 defeat against Brest. During the 2008–09 season Sako became an integral part of the team, helping the club narrowly avoid relegation on the final day.

=== Saint-Étienne ===
On 9 July 2009, Sako departed Châteauroux for Ligue 1 club Saint-Étienne, where he signed a four-year deal for an undisclosed fee.

=== Wolverhampton Wanderers ===
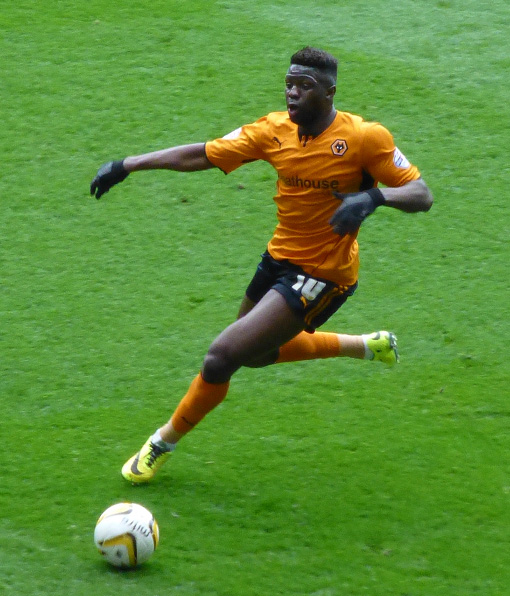
Sako playing for Wolverhampton Wanderers in 2014

On 29 August 2012, Sako signed for Championship club Wolverhampton Wanderers on a three-year contract for an undisclosed fee that was reported to be £2.2 million. He scored on his Wolves debut in a League Cup tie against Northampton Town on 30 August 2012, and again on his league debut in the following match, a 3–1 defeat at Cardiff.

The winger adapted well to English football, scoring ten times in total and contributing eleven assists. However, his season was halted early when he tore his hamstring in March 2013 in a match against Bristol City, which ruled him out for much of the season's final games, during which the team were relegated to League One.

Sako was the subject of transfer speculation during Summer 2013 with interest from Fulham in June 2013 but the London club did not meet a reported £4 million asking price. Owing to his uncertain future, the player did not play in Wolves' final match of the transfer window as he "didn't feel he was in the right frame of mind". Several reported bids from Nottingham Forest were rejected by the club. In October 2013, Forest again attempted to set up a deal but Wolves pulled out of negotiations citing that "the terms surrounding the offer were unrealistic".

Despite the initial speculation surrounding his future and the breakdown of his proposed move to Forest, Sako went on to have a productive season for Wolves, finishing as joint top-scorer alongside the departed Leigh Griffiths as Wolves won the League One title with a record points haul for the third tier. Sako was also named in the League One PFA Team of the Year for the 2013–14 season alongside four of his teammates.

Back at Championship level, Sako continued to score regularly for Wolves and was named in the Championship PFA Team of the Year for the 2014–15 season. He finished the season as the club's (joint) top goalscorer as the team missed out on the play-offs on goal difference. Out of contract with the club, he voiced his desire to play in the Premier League, while head coach Kenny Jackett stated that he expected Sako to depart.

=== Crystal Palace ===
On 5 August 2015, Sako joined Premier League side Crystal Palace on a three-year contract following his release from Wolves. He scored his first goal for the club on his full debut against Aston Villa on 22 August 2015. Sako then scored again the following week away to Chelsea, in a 2–1 win, which was José Mourinho's second ever loss at Stamford Bridge. Sako also assisted the second goal scored by Joel Ward.

In the 2017–18 season, Sako's form started to pick up under the management of Roy Hodgson scoring his first goal of the season against Huddersfield in the EFL Cup. He later scored against Bristol City in the same competition. Sako was also back scoring in the league as well, netting against Watford, Burnley and Leicester. He also added a goal in the FA Cup in an away loss to Brighton & Hove Albion.

=== West Bromwich Albion ===
On 2 October 2018, West Bromwich Albion signed free agent Sako until the end of the season.

=== Return to Crystal Palace ===
On 27 January 2019, Sako rejoined Crystal Palace on a short-term contract until the end of the 2018–19 season. He was released on expiry of his contract at the end of June.

=== Denizlispor ===
On 28 July 2019, Denizlispor announced the signing of free agent Sako via Twitter. But later, the club gave up the transfer due to his ankle injury history.

=== Pafos ===
On 6 September 2019, Pafos announced the signing of Sako via Facebook.

=== Return to Saint-Étienne ===
On 30 December 2021, Sako returned to his former club Saint-Étienne on a contract until the end of the 2021–22 season.

== International career ==
=== Youth ===
Sako played for the Malian U17 team in one friendly match in 2005, while the team was preparing for the 2005 African Under-17 Championship. The following year, he returned to the French team playing with the under-18 squad. He was a member of the French squad that participated in the 2007 European Under-19 Championship reaching the semi-finals before being eliminated by Spain. He made his French under-21 debut on 11 February 2009 in a friendly match against Tunisia. He scored his first under-21 goal in the 2009 Toulon Tournament against Qatar.

=== Senior ===
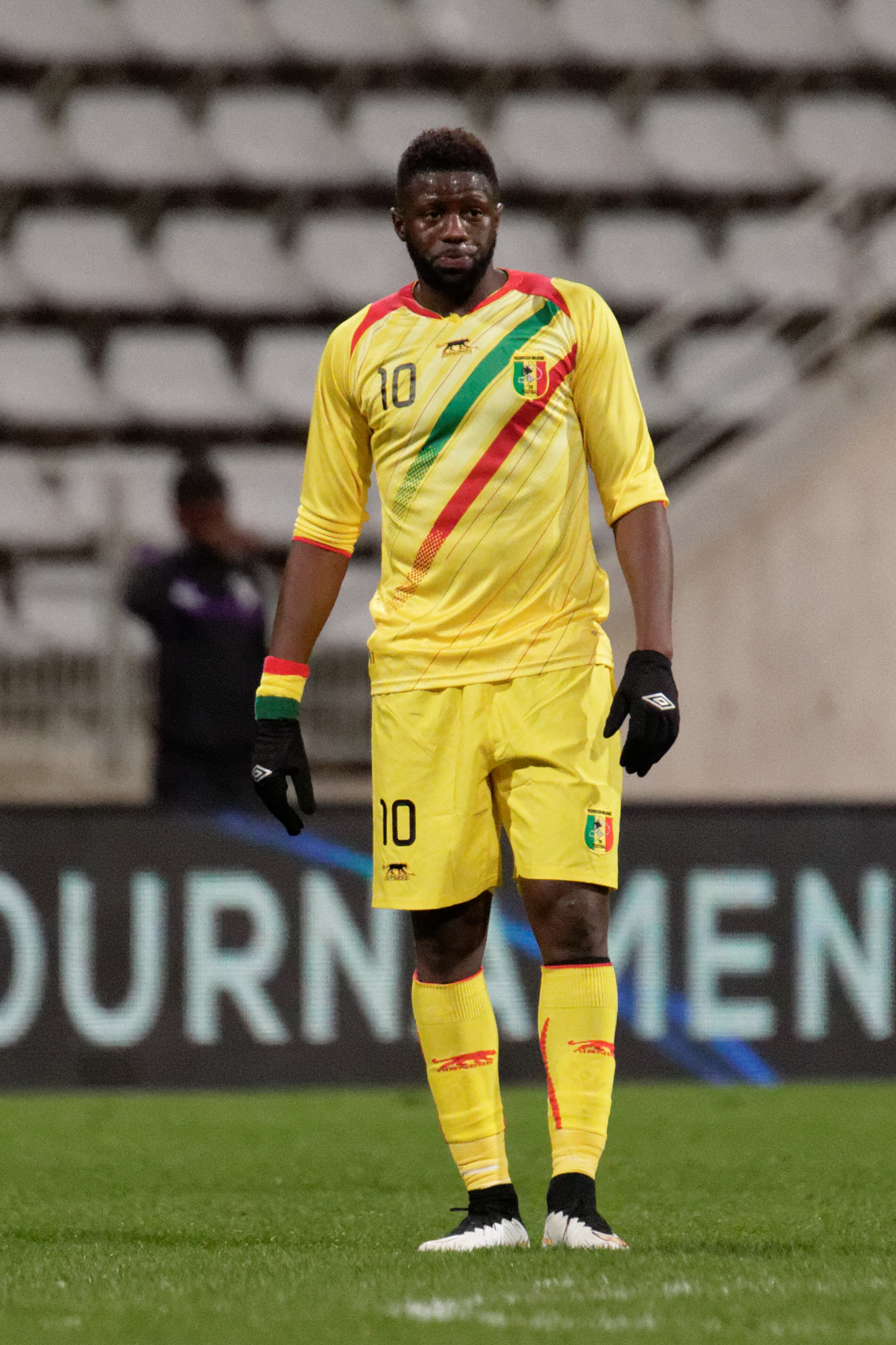
Sako playing for Mali in 2015

Sako was called up by the Malian national team for the first time for a friendly against Senegal on 5 March 2014. He scored his first international goal against Guinea in a friendly match played in Colombes, France, on 25 May 2014. His first goal in competitive internationals came when he scored the opener in a 2–0 win over Malawi in an Africa Cup of Nations qualification match played in Bamako on 7 September 2014. In December 2014 Sako was called up to the Mali squad for the finals of the 2015 Africa Cup of Nations to be held in Equatorial Guinea in January 2015. This was to be his first taste of a senior international tournament.

Sako started Mali's first two matches in group D of the 2015 Africa Cup of Nations. These both finished in 1–1 draws, against Cameroon on 20 January and against Ivory Coast on 24 January. Sako scored a left-foot half-volley against Ivory Coast that the BBC hailed as the goal of the tournament at that point. Sako was unable to start the final and decisive group game against Guinea due to an illness though he did appear from the bench for the final 15 minutes of the game. This too ended in a 1–1 stalemate, meaning that five of the six games in group D finished 1–1 and this led to the drawing of lots between Mali and Guinea to decide who qualified for the quarter finals and who went home. It was Guinea who emerged from the hat, meaning the Eagles exited the tournament unbeaten.

== Career statistics ==
=== Club ===
As of 1 July 2022

Appearances and goals by club, season and competition
Club	Season	League			Cup		League Cup		Other		Total	
Club	Season	Division	Apps	Goals	Apps	Goals	Apps	Goals	Apps	Goals	Apps	Goals
Châteauroux	2005–06	Ligue 2	1	0	0	0	0	0	—		1	0
Châteauroux	2006–07	Ligue 2	17	0	0	0	0	0	—		17	0
Châteauroux	2007–08	Ligue 2	15	1	0	0	0	0	—		15	1
Châteauroux	2008–09	Ligue 2	35	9	0	0	0	0	—		35	9
Châteauroux	Total		68	10	0	0	0	0	—		68	10
Saint-Étienne	2009–10	Ligue 1	30	1	2	1	1	0	—		33	2
Saint-Étienne	2010–11	Ligue 1	38	7	1	0	3	0	—		42	7
Saint-Étienne	2011–12	Ligue 1	36	4	1	0	2	1	—		39	5
Saint-Étienne	2012–13	Ligue 1	2	0	0	0	0	0	—		2	0
Saint-Étienne	Total		106	12	4	0	6	1	—		116	13
Wolverhampton Wanderers	2012–13	EFL Championship	37	9	1	0	1	1	—		39	10
Wolverhampton Wanderers	2013–14	EFL League One	40	12	1	0	0	0	1	1	42	13
Wolverhampton Wanderers	2014–15	EFL Championship	41	15	1	0	1	0	—		43	15
Wolverhampton Wanderers	Total		118	36	3	0	2	1	1	1	124	38
Crystal Palace	2015–16	Premier League	20	2	3	0	0	0	—		23	2
Crystal Palace	2016–17	Premier League	7	0	0	0	1	0	—		8	0
Crystal Palace	2017–18	Premier League	16	3	1	1	2	2	—		19	6
Crystal Palace	Total		43	5	4	1	3	2	—		50	8
West Bromwich Albion	2018–19	EFL Championship	5	0	1	1	0	0	—		6	1
Crystal Palace	2018–19	Premier League	4	0	0	0	0	0	0	0	4	0
Pafos	2019–20	Cypriot First Division	6	1	0	0	—		—		6	1
Saint-Étienne	2021–22	Ligue 1	7	0	1	1	—		0	0	8	1
Career total			357	64	13	4	11	3	1	1	382	72

=== International goals ===
Scores and results list Mali's goal tally first.

No.	Date	Venue	Opponent	Score	Result	Competition	Ref.
1.	25 May 2014	Stade Olympique Yves-du-Manoir, Colombes, France	Guinea	1–0	1–2	Friendly	
2.	7 September 2014	Stade du 26 Mars, Bamako, Mali	Malawi	1–0	2–0	2015 Africa Cup of Nations qualification	
3.	15 October 2014	Stade du 26 Mars, Bamako, Mali	Ethiopia	1–0	2–3	2015 Africa Cup of Nations qualification	
4.	24 January 2015	Estadio de Malabo, Malabo, Equatorial Guinea	Ivory Coast	1–0	1–1	2015 Africa Cup of Nations	
5.	25 March 2015	Stade Pierre Brisson, Beauvais, France	Gabon	3–3	3–4	Friendly	
6.	31 March 2015	Stade Sébastien Charléty, Paris, France	Ghana	1–1	1–1	Friendly	
7.	9 October 2015	Stade de l'Aube, Troyes, France	Burkina Faso	1–0	4–1	Friendly	
8.	9 October 2015	Stade de l'Aube, Troyes, France	Burkina Faso	2–0	4–1	Friendly	
9.	17 November 2015	Stade du 26 Mars, Bamako, Mali	Botswana	2–0	2–0	2018 FIFA World Cup qualification	

== Honours ==
Wolverhampton Wanderers

- Football League One: 2013–14

Crystal Palace

- FA Cup runner-up: 2015–16

Individual

- PFA Team of the Year: 2013–14 League One, 2014–15 Championship
- Football League One Team of the Season: 2013–14
