= Michael Jacobs (footballer) =

English footballer (born 1991)

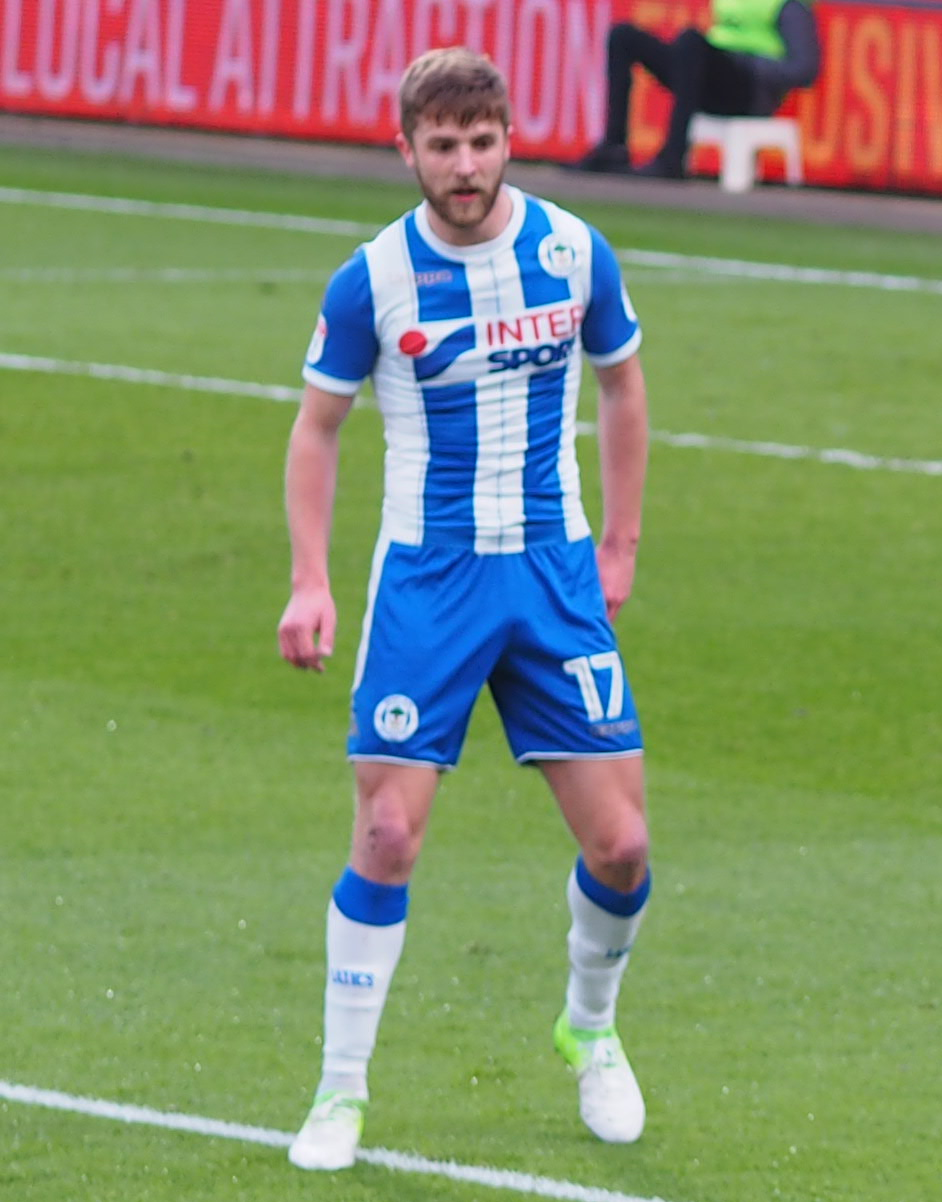
- Jacobs playing for Wigan Athletic in 2018

Personal information
- Full name: Michael Edward Jacobs
- Date of birth: 4 November 1991 (age 34)
- Place of birth: Rothwell, England
- Height: 5 ft 9 in (1.75 m)
- Position: Left winger

Team information
- Current team: Harborough Town
- Number: 29

Youth career
- 2007–2009: Northampton Town

Senior career*
Years	Team	Apps	(Gls)
2009–2012	Northampton Town	87	(11)
2010	→ Nuneaton Town (loan)	4	(0)
2012–2014	Derby County	42	(2)
2013–2014	→ Wolverhampton Wanderers (loan)	9	(1)
2014–2015	Wolverhampton Wanderers	33	(7)
2015	→ Blackpool (loan)	5	(1)
2015–2020	Wigan Athletic	176	(32)
2020–2023	Portsmouth	76	(12)
2023–2025	Chesterfield	57	(6)
2025–2026	Northampton Town	20	(1)
- * Club domestic league appearances and goals as of 19:23, 2 May 2026 (UTC)

Michael Edward Jacobs (born 4 November 1991) is an English professional footballer who last played as a left winger for EFL League One club Northampton Town.

He began his career at Northampton Town, making his professional debut in 2009 and winning back-to-back Player of the Season awards in 2011 and 2012. He moved to Championship side Derby County in June 2012 for a fee of around £400,000, before signing for Wolverhampton Wanderers in January 2014 after a successful loan period. Eighteen months later, having been part of Wolves' promotion from League One, he moved to Wigan Athletic. He spent five years with Wigan where he won the League One title twice, in 2016 and 2018 respectively, and amassed 188 appearances and 32 goals.

== Career ==
=== Northampton Town ===
Born in Rothwell, Northamptonshire, Jacobs came through the youth ranks at Northampton Town, and made his debut on 6 October 2009 in a 2–1 home win against Bournemouth in the Football League Trophy. His next appearance came in the next round of the competition, when Northampton lost 3–1 at Milton Keynes Dons. In February 2010, he was loaned out for a month – in a move classed as "work experience" – to non-League team Nuneaton Town to gain regular first team experience. During this spell he made four appearances.

Having signed a professional contract with the club, Jacobs appeared as a substitute in Northampton's opening game of the 2010–11 season; a 3–0 loss at Torquay. Three days later he scored his first senior goal as he netted in a 2–0 League Cup win against League One side Brighton & Hove Albion. He became a regular for Northampton and scored his second goal on 22 September in a 2–2 draw against Premier League side Liverpool at Anfield in the next round of the League Cup. After the game went to a penalty shoot-out, Jacobs scored his as Northampton won the shoot-out 4–2. He ended the season with eight goals and was named the club's Player of the Year. He remained a regular in Northampton's team during the 2011–12 season, in which he scored seven goals.

=== Derby County ===
After making 100 appearances in total, Jacobs' contract with Northampton expired at the end of the 2011–12 season leading to lengthy speculation that he would move to Championship side Derby County. On 26 June, he signed a three-year contract with Derby. As he was under 24, Northampton were entitled to compensation, either agreed by the two clubs or set by a tribunal. Derby and Northampton agreed an undisclosed fee for him, believed to be around £400,000 and the deal officially went through on 1 July 2012.

Jacobs made his Derby debut in a first round League Cup tie against Scunthorpe on 14 August 2012. The match finished 5–5 after extra time, with Jacobs assisting all five of Derby's goals but conceding the penalty that led to Scunthorpe's fifth goal. He also scored a penalty in the shoot-out but Derby lost 7–6 and were eliminated. After eight consecutive substitute appearances, Jacobs started his first Championship game on 23 October, in a 2–1 win at Ipswich Town. He also started the following match, a 3–0 defeat at Peterborough United on 27 October. His next three appearances were all as a late substitute and he didn't become a regular starter until the end of November, when he started eight matches in a row. A performance in a 3–2 win against Birmingham City on 24 November, where he created two goals, earned praise from his manager Nigel Clough, however he was also reminded not to neglect his defensive duties. He scored his first Derby goal in a 2–1 home loss to Hull City on 21 December.

On New Year's Day 2013 Jacobs was deployed in an unfamiliar role as a forward, in which he scored during a 3–1 win over Middlesbrough as well as setting up a further goal and being named man-of-the-match. His performance was praised by Nigel Clough, who noted how well he adapted to the role. However, he would start only one further match during the season and began all other fixtures from the substitutes bench.

Jacobs also started the first game of the 2013–14 season on the bench, but was selected to start the second, a 1–0 League Cup win over Oldham, in which he scored the only goal. His only playing time continued to come as a substitute, despite a change of manager at Derby as Steve McClaren replaced Nigel Clough in October 2013.

=== Wolverhampton Wanderers ===
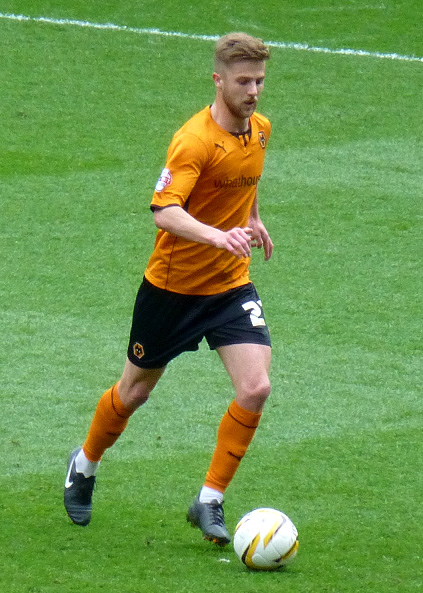
Jacobs playing for Wolverhampton Wanderers in 2014

On 11 November 2013, Jacobs was loaned to League One side Wolverhampton Wanderers in a deal to run until 4 January 2014. An unused substitute for Wolves' first game after his arrival, he made his club debut in November 2013 in a goalless draw with Brentford and scored his first Wolves goal on 26 December in a 2–0 win against Crewe Alexandra on Boxing Day 2013.

Following this loan spell, a permanent deal was agreed on 8 January 2014 for Jacobs to sign for Wolverhampton Wanderers for an undisclosed fee, on a 2 1/2-year contract (with the option of an additional year). By the end of the season the team had won promotion as League One champions with a record points total for the division (103), with Jacobs contributing eight goals from midfield.

At Championship level, Jacobs was regularly involved in Wolves' first team but fell out of contention as the season progressed. In March 2015 he was sent on loan to fellow Championship club Blackpool in a deal due to last until end of the 2014–15 season. He made five appearances (scoring once) as the club unsuccessfully battled relegation before being recalled by Wolves for the run-in.

=== Wigan Athletic ===
On 27 July 2015, Jacobs moved to newly relegated League One side Wigan Athletic, signing a three-year deal for an undisclosed fee.

On 16 October 2017, Jacobs signed a two-year contract extension with Wigan which would keep him at the club until the summer of 2020. Upon putting pen-to-paper on the new deal, Jacobs stated: "I have played some of my best football here and I am excited for the future."

After spending five years with Wigan, Jacobs left the club upon the expiration of his contract at the end of the 2019–20 season.

=== Portsmouth ===
On 14 September 2020, Jacobs was signed by EFL League One team Portsmouth, on a two-year deal. For the 2020–21 season, Jacobs was assigned the squad number 24 shirt.

Jacobs left Portsmouth at the end of the 2022–23 season, following the expiration of his contract.

=== Chesterfield ===
On 4 August 2023, Jacobs was signed by National League side Chesterfield, reuniting him with his former Wigan manager Paul Cook and teammate Will Grigg. Jacobs was released by The Spireites at the end of the 2024/25 season, having made 70 appearances across 2 seasons for the club.

=== Northampton Town ===
On 16 June 2025, Jacobs agreed to return to Northampton Town on a one-year deal.

On 5 May 2026, Northampton Town announced that Jacobs has not been offered a new contract and released by the club following their regulation from League 1. The club do have an option on Michael Jacobs, which can be considered once a new manager is appointed.

== Career statistics ==
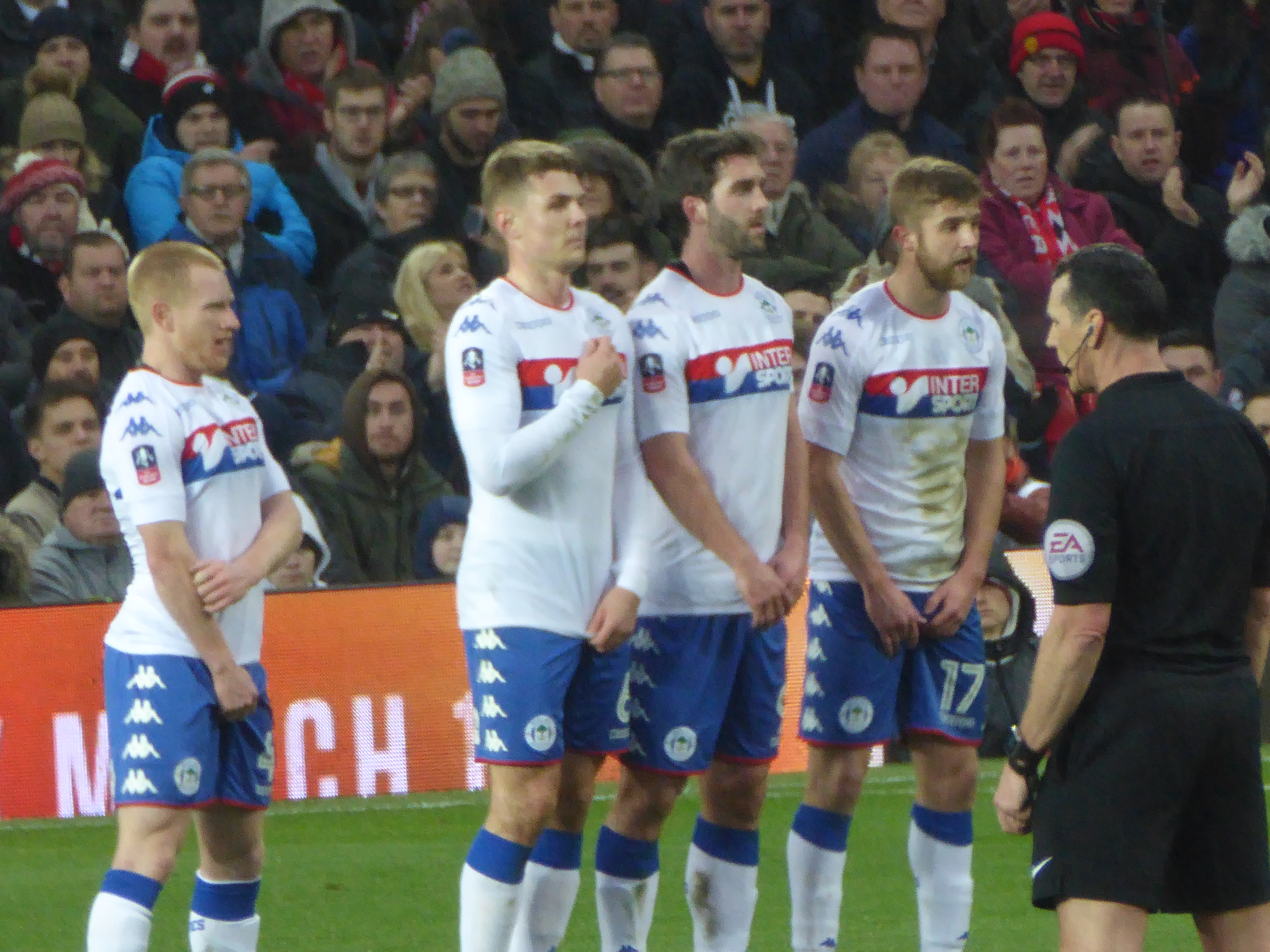
Jacobs (wearing No.17) in the Wigan Athletic wall, facing a Manchester United free-kick, 2017

As of 2 May 2026

Appearances and goals by club, season and competition
Club	Season	League			FA Cup		League Cup		Other		Total	
Club	Season	Division	Apps	Goals	Apps	Goals	Apps	Goals	Apps	Goals	Apps	Goals
Northampton Town	2009–10	League Two	0	0	0	0	0	0	2 (Note: Appearance(s) in EFL Trophy)	0	2	0
Northampton Town	2010–11	League Two	41	5	2	1	4	2	1	0	48	8
Northampton Town	2011–12	League Two	46	6	1	0	2	0	1	1	50	7
Northampton Town	Total		87	11	3	1	6	2	4	1	100	15
Derby County	2012–13	Championship	39	2	2	0	1	0	0	0	42	2
Derby County	2013–14	Championship	3	0	0	0	3	1	0	0	6	1
Derby County	Total		42	2	2	0	4	1	0	0	48	3
Wolverhampton Wanderers	2013–14	League One	30	8	0	0	0	0	0	0	30	8
Wolverhampton Wanderers	2014–15	Championship	12	0	0	0	1	0	0	0	13	0
Wolverhampton Wanderers	Total		42	8	0	0	1	0	0	0	43	8
Blackpool (loan)	2014–15	Championship	5	1	0	0	0	0	0	0	5	1
Wigan Athletic	2015–16	League One	35	10	1	0	1	0	1	0	38	10
Wigan Athletic	2016–17	Championship	43	3	2	0	1	0	0	0	46	3
Wigan Athletic	2017–18	League One	44	12	6	0	0	0	0	0	50	12
Wigan Athletic	2018–19	Championship	22	4	0	0	0	0	0	0	22	4
Wigan Athletic	2019–20	Championship	32	3	0	0	0	0	0	0	32	3
Wigan Athletic	Total		176	32	9	0	2	0	1	0	188	32
Portsmouth	2020–21	League One	20	2	1	0	0	0	1	0	22	2
Portsmouth	2021–22	League One	24	6	2	0	1	0	5	1	31	7
Portsmouth	2022–23	League One	32	4	1	0	2	0	4	1	39	5
Portsmouth	Total		76	12	5	0	3	0	10	2	93	14
Chesterfield	2023–24	National League	40	5	3	0	—		1 (Note: Appearance(s) in FA Trophy)	1	44	6
Chesterfield	2024–25	League Two	17	1	2	0	1	0	5 (Note: 2 appearance(s) in EFL League Two play-offs)	0	25	1
Chesterfield	Total		57	6	5	0	1	0	6	1	69	7
Northampton Town	2025–26	League One	20	1	1	0	0	0	7	1	28	2
Northampton Town	Total		107	12	4	1	6	2	11	2	128	17
Career total			499	72	25	1	17	3	28	5	570	81

Note
A. Soccerbase's stats for the match between Bolton Wanderers and Derby County on 21 August 2012 fail to include the substitute appearance made by Jacobs. Therefore, until and unless they correct it, he should have one more appearance for Derby than given on his Soccerbase page.

== Honours ==
Wolverhampton Wanderers

- Football League One: 2013–14

Wigan Athletic

- Football/EFL League One: 2015–16, 2017–18

Portsmouth

- EFL Trophy runner-up: 2019–20

Chesterfield

- National League: 2023–24
