= Victor Wagner =

Australian footballer (born 1969)

Personal information
- Full name: Victor Wagner Pedersen
- Date of birth: 18 March 1996 (age 30)
- Place of birth: Denmark
- Position: Centre back

Team information
- Current team: Varde IF
- Number: 4

Youth career
- –2014: Esbjerg fB
- 2014–2015: Wolverhampton

Senior career*
| Years | Team | Apps | (Gls) |
| 2015 | Varde IF | | |
| 2015–2016 | FC Vestsjælland | 12 | (0) |
| 2016 | Thisted FC | 0 | (0) |
| 2016–2018 | Nybergsund | 46 | (0) |
| 2019 | Næstved | 3 | (0) |
| 2019–2020 | Brattvåg IL | 16 | (0) |
| 2021 | Avarta | 6 | (1) |
| 2021– | Varde IF | | |
- * Club domestic league appearances and goals as of 19:19, 30 June 2021 (UTC)

Victor Wagner Pedersen (born March 18, 1996) is a Danish footballer who currently plays for Varde IF.

== Career ==
=== Youth career ===
Wagner started his career in Esbjerg fB, but in 2014 he went to Wolverhampton F.C. on a one-year youth contract, with an option for a further year.

=== FC Vestsjælland ===
On July 6, 2015, Wagner signed a two-year contract with FC Vestsjælland. He got his league debut for the club on July 25, against Silkeborg IF.

On August 11, he scored his first goal for FCV, in a game in the Danish Cup against Frem Sakskøbing.

=== Thisted FC ===
On 7 February 2016, it was confirmed that Wagner had signed for Thisted FC.

=== Næstved BK ===
Wagner signed with Danish 1st Division club Næstved BK on 31 January 2019.

=== Return to Varde IF ===
In the summer 2021, Wagner returned to his former club Varde IF in the Denmark Series.
