= 2008–09 Wolverhampton Wanderers F.C. season =

English football club season

Wolverhampton Wanderers
2008–09 season
- Chairman: Steve Morgan OBE
- Manager: Mick McCarthy
- Football League Championship: 1st (3rd divisional title)
- FA Cup: 4th round
- League Cup: 2nd round
- Top goalscorer: League: Sylvan Ebanks-Blake (25); All: Sylvan Ebanks-Blake (25)
- Highest home attendance: 28,252 (vs Doncaster, 3 May 2009)
- Lowest home attendance: 9,424 (vs Accrington Stanley, 12 August 2008)
- Average home league attendance: 24,153
Home colours	Away colours

The 2008–09 season was the 110th season of competitive league football in the history of English football club Wolverhampton Wanderers. They played the season in the second tier of the English football system, the Football League Championship. The season turned out to be a major success as the club finished top of the division and were therefore promoted back to the Premier League after a five-year absence.

The team enjoyed their best start to the season for almost fifty years, winning seven of their opening eight games and scoring 23 goals in the process. They led the table continuously from October until the season's end, when they were crowned champions, winning their first silverware in 20 years. Leading goalscorer Sylvan Ebanks-Blake also finished as the division's top scorer for a second consecutive season.

== Season review ==
The close season saw the club continue their policy of signing young players with potential from the lower leagues, rather than pursuing their heavy investment strategy of early times. The close season saw the likes of Richard Stearman, David Jones and Sam Vokes arrive, along with the experience of Chris Iwelumo, while making a transfer profit with the sale of players such as Seyi Olofinjana, Jay Bothroyd and Freddy Eastwood. The squad was also boosted by retaining their most valuable assets in Wayne Hennessey, Michael Kightly and the division's top goalscorer of last season, Sylvan Ebanks-Blake.

The season saw the club's strongest start since 1949–50, as a draw away to Plymouth preceded two runs of seven consecutive wins — scoring 23 goals and conceding only seven goals in the first eight games. Transfer deadline day saw the club add further defensive strength as three new defenders joined the ranks — George Friend, Matt Hill and Jason Shackell. Although their winning streak was ended by a 3–0 home defeat to promotion rivals Reading, as well as a 5–2 defeat at Norwich, which saw Wolves surrender top spot to Birmingham City, Wolves rediscovered their winning form for the second run of seven consecutive wins to lead the table at Christmas.

After drawing their final two fixtures of 2008, Wolves endured a dismal start to 2009, winning just once in eleven league fixtures. Trying to arrest this slump, the January transfer window saw the arrival of three new faces: Kyel Reid and Nigel Quashie on loan for the remainder of the season from West Ham United; defender Christophe Berra also joined from Scottish club Hearts for £2.3million. The FA Cup had brought some cheer with a fringe squad winning 2–0 at local rivals Birmingham in the 3rd round, before the club exited the competition with a 2–1 home defeat to Premier League side Middlesbrough.

Weathering their bad run of league form, Wolves managed to regain an air of consistency, reinventing their game from the free-flowing, free-scoring football of the first third of the season to hold down a string of clean sheets and one goal margin victories against Crystal Palace and Sheffield Wednesday. With promotion rivals Birmingham City and Reading unable to take advantage of their poor run, March saw an upturn in Wolves' league form as the club took 13 points from a possible 15, strengthening their position at the top of the table that they had led since October.

With just seven games left on the Championship calendar, Aston Villa striker Marlon Harewood was loaned for the run-in, though the team were also hit by the news that key midfielder Michael Kightly would miss the remainder of the season after suffering a broken metatarsal in his foot. Further injury woe struck when Chris Iwelumo suffered medial ligament damage in a loss to local rivals Birmingham in April that ended a five-game unbeaten run.

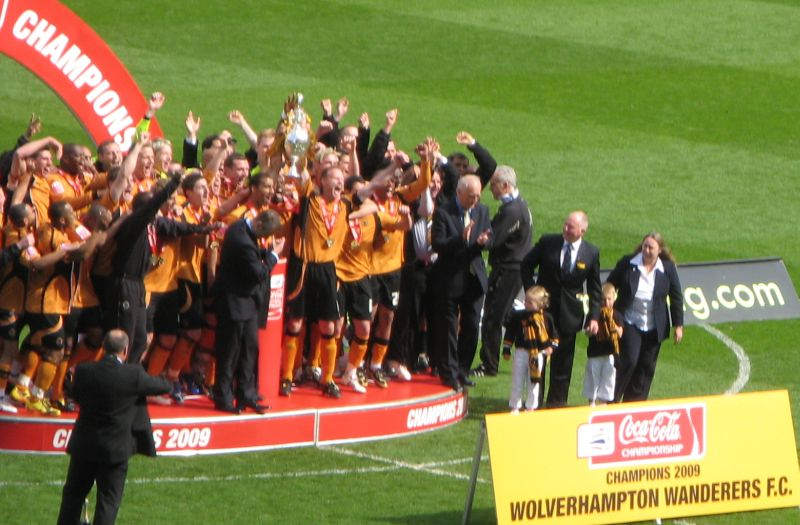
Championship trophy presentation at Molineux on the final day of the 2008-09 season.

However, Easter weekend brought 3–0 home win against struggling Southampton, followed by a 3–2 away victory at Derby County that gave Wolves a seven-point lead over third-placed Sheffield United. Promotion to the Premier League was confirmed on 18 April 2009 when a goal from Ebanks-Blake gave Wolves a 1–0 win over Queens Park Rangers. Seven days later, Wolves clinched their first league title since the 1988–89 season — and their first title at second-tier level since 1976–77 — after a 1–1 draw at Barnsley brought the point they required for the title.

Wolves completed their season with a 1–0 home win over Doncaster Rovers, after which they were presented with the Championship trophy to crown their most successful season in decades as they returned to the top flight after a five-year absence.

== Results ==
=== Preseason ===
Wolves conducted a short three-match tour of Scotland, their first visit in three years. As had become common in recent years, only their final game was held at their Molineux home. A second "Wolves XI" team largely comprising academy prospects and out of favour senior players also played a series of matches during this period.

12 July 2008	Wrexham	1–0	Wolverhampton Wanderers	Wrexham
15:00 BST	Baynes 49'	Report		Stadium: Racecourse Ground; Attendance: 2,749; Referee: Steve Cummins

16 July 2008	Hereford United	1–3	Wolverhampton Wanderers	Hereford
20:00 BST	Guinan 17' (pen.)	Report	Kightly 30'; Ward 47', 75'	Stadium: Edgar Street; Attendance: 1,539; Referee: Patrick Keane

20 July 2008	Dundee	0–1	Wolverhampton Wanderers	Dundee
15:00 BST		Report	Ebanks-Blake 90'	Stadium: Dens Park; Attendance: 2,091; Referee: Stephen Finnie

23 July 2008	Motherwell	1–1	Wolverhampton Wanderers	Motherwell
19:30 BST	McGarry 3'	Report	Ebanks-Blake 20'	Stadium: Fir Park; Attendance: 2,238; Referee: Eddie Smith

26 July 2008	Kilmarnock	0–3	Wolverhampton Wanderers	Kilmarnock
14:00 BST		Report	Iwelumo 24', 56'; Vokes 32'	Stadium: Rugby Park; Attendance: 2,410; Referee: Alan Muir

29 July 2008	Walsall	0–1	Wolverhampton Wanderers	Walsall
19:45 BST		Report	Keogh 51'	Stadium: Banks's Stadium; Attendance: 4,002; Referee: Steve Bratt

2 August 2008	Wolverhampton Wanderers	4–2	Blackburn Rovers	Wolverhampton
15:00 BST	Elokobi 9'; Keogh 23'; Iwelumo 59' (pen.); Jarvis 75'	Report	Derbyshire 16'; Santa Cruz 24'	Stadium: Molineux; Attendance: 10,238; Referee: Andrew Penn

"Wolves XI" pre season results (all away): 4–1 v Chasetown (18 July), 1–2 v Rhyl (26 July), 2–0 v Stafford Rangers (5 August)

=== Football League Championship ===
A total of 24 teams competed in the Championship in the 2008–09 season. Each team would play every other team twice, once at their stadium, and once at the opposition's. Three points were awarded to teams for each win, one point per draw, and none for defeats. The provisional fixture list was released on 16 June 2008, but was subject to change in the event of matches being selected for television coverage.

9 August 2008 1	Plymouth Argyle	2–2	Wolverhampton Wanderers	Plymouth
15:00 BST	Fallon 7'; Seip 55'	Report	Kightly 19'; Vokes 78'	Stadium: Home Park; Attendance: 14,789 (2,689 away fans); Referee: Kevin Friend

16 August 2008 2	Wolverhampton Wanderers	4–1	Sheffield Wednesday	Wolverhampton
15:00 BST	Iwelumo 28', 59'; Ebanks-Blake 54' (pen.); Edwards 90+1'	Report	Esajas 15'	Stadium: Molineux; Attendance: 22,491 (2,014 away fans); Referee: Mike Jones

23 August 2008 3	Ipswich Town	0–2	Wolverhampton Wanderers	Ipswich
15:00 BST		Report	Ebanks-Blake 21'; Edwards 78'	Stadium: Portman Road; Attendance: 21,483 (1,412 away fans); Referee: Steve Tanner

30 August 2008 4	Wolverhampton Wanderers	5–1	Nottingham Forest	Wolverhampton
15:00 BST	Jones 14'; Morgan 29' (o.g.); Kightly 43', 62'; Iwelumo 45'	Report	Stearman 55' (o.g.)	Stadium: Molineux; Attendance: 25,301 (2,591 away fans); Referee: Grant Hegley

13 September 2008 5	Charlton Athletic	1–3	Wolverhampton Wanderers	London
15:00 BST	Bailey 3'	Report	Ebanks-Blake 61' (pen.); Vokes 81', 87'	Stadium: The Valley; Attendance: 21,547 (2,873 away fans); Referee: Anthony Taylor

16 September 2008 6	Wolverhampton Wanderers	2–1	Crystal Palace	Wolverhampton
19:45 BST	Ebanks-Blake 1'; Keogh 58'	Report	Ifill 32'	Stadium: Molineux; Attendance: 22,200 (409 away fans); Referee: Scott Mathieson

20 September 2008 7	Preston North End	1–3	Wolverhampton Wanderers	Preston
15:00 BST	Mellor 90+5' (pen.)	Report	Iwelumo 36', 66', 72' (pen.)	Stadium: Deepdale; Attendance: 17,567 (2,992 away fans); Referee: Martin Atkinson

27 September 2008 8	Wolverhampton Wanderers	2–0	Bristol City	Wolverhampton
12:30 BST	Kightly 17'; Ebanks-Blake 68'	Report		Stadium: Molineux; Attendance: 24,324 (1,632 away fans); Referee: Phil Crossley

30 September 2008 9	Wolverhampton Wanderers	0–3	Reading	Wolverhampton
19:45 BST		Report	Hennessey 4' (o.g.); Bikey 71'; Cissé 88'	Stadium: Molineux; Attendance: 24,302 (618 away fans); Referee: Rob Shoebridge

4 October 2008 10	Swansea City	3–1	Wolverhampton Wanderers	Swansea
15:00 BST	Gomez 1'; Scotland 41', 57'	Report	Keogh 16'	Stadium: Liberty Stadium; Attendance: 17,556 (2,578 away fans); Referee: Trevor Kettle

18 October 2008 11	Wolverhampton Wanderers	2–1	Coventry City	Wolverhampton
15:00 BST	Kightly 42'; Ebanks-Blake 59'	Report	Mifsud 6'	Stadium: Molineux; Attendance: 25,893 (2,561 away fans); Referee: Steve Bennett

21 October 2008 12	Norwich City	5–2	Wolverhampton Wanderers	Norwich
19:45 BST	Ikeme 28' (o.g.); Lita 39', 58', 70'; Croft 75'	Report	Collins 41'; Ebanks-Blake 67' (pen.)	Stadium: Carrow Road; Attendance: 24,351 (885 away fans); Referee: Graham Horwood

25 October 2008 13	Watford	2–3	Wolverhampton Wanderers	Watford
15:00 BST	Rasiak 21'; O'Toole 47'; Smith (penalty missed) 61'	Report	Iwelumo 1'; Jones 40'; Gray 71'	Stadium: Vicarage Road; Attendance: 16,386 (2,268 away fans); Referee: Keith Woolmer

28 October 2008 14	Wolverhampton Wanderers	2–1	Swansea City	Wolverhampton
19:45 GMT	Ebanks-Blake 45', 57'	Report	Pratley 49'	Stadium: Molineux; Attendance: 21,988 (1,429 away fans); Referee: Richard Beeby

1 November 2008 15	Cardiff City	1–2	Wolverhampton Wanderers	Cardiff
17:20 GMT	McCormack 19'	Report	Iwelumo 4'; Ebanks-Blake 8'	Stadium: Ninian Park; Attendance: 17,734 (314 away fans); Referee: Steve Tanner

8 November 2008 16	Wolverhampton Wanderers	2–0	Burnley	Wolverhampton
15:00 GMT	Kightly 31', 75'	Report		Stadium: Molineux; Attendance: 23,711 (1,088 away fans); Referee: Darren Deadman

15 November 2008 17	Southampton	1–2	Wolverhampton Wanderers	Southampton
15:00 GMT	Pearce 21'	Report	Iwelumo 8'; Jones 17'	Stadium: St Mary's Stadium; Attendance: 17,812 (2,849 away fans); Referee: Lee Mason

22 November 2008 18	Wolverhampton Wanderers	2–0	Blackpool	Wolverhampton
15:00 GMT	Iwelumo 30', 66'	Report		Stadium: Molineux; Attendance: 22,044 (895 away fans); Referee: Andy D'Urso

25 November 2008 19	Sheffield United	1–3	Wolverhampton Wanderers	Sheffield
19:45 GMT	Spring 75'	Report	Iwelumo 5', 59'; Ebanks-Blake 63'	Stadium: Bramall Lane; Attendance: 27,111 (1,488 away fans); Referee: Graham Laws

29 November 2008 20	Wolverhampton Wanderers	1–1	Birmingham City	Wolverhampton
12:30 GMT	Ebanks-Blake 74'	Report	Jerome 47'	Stadium: Molineux; Attendance: 26,329 (2,588 away fans); Referee: Paul Taylor

6 December 2008 21	Queens Park Rangers	1–0	Wolverhampton Wanderers	London
17:20 GMT	Rowlands 63'	Report		Stadium: Loftus Road; Attendance: 13,416 (1,515 away fans); Referee: Iain Williamson

9 December 2008 22	Wolverhampton Wanderers	3–0	Derby County	Wolverhampton
19:45 GMT	Ebanks-Blake 2' (pen.), 58'; Edwards 40'	Report		Stadium: Molineux; Attendance: 21,326 (1,298 away fans); Referee: Grant Hegley

13 December 2008 23	Wolverhampton Wanderers	2–0	Barnsley	Wolverhampton
15:00 GMT	Hassell 19' (o.g.); Foley 86'	Report		Stadium: Molineux; Attendance: 22,399 (268 away fans); Referee: Graham Salisbury

20 December 2008 24	Doncaster Rovers	0–1	Wolverhampton Wanderers	Doncaster
15:00 GMT		Report	Collins 81'	Stadium: Keepmoat Stadium; Attendance: 13,669 (3,216 away fans); Referee: Kevin Wright

26 December 2008 25	Wolverhampton Wanderers	1–1	Sheffield United	Wolverhampton
15:00 GMT	Collins 19'	Report	Beattie 22'	Stadium: Molineux; Attendance: 27,106 (2,201 away fans); Referee: Tony Bates

29 December 2008 26	Blackpool	2–2	Wolverhampton Wanderers	Blackpool
19:45 GMT	Taylor-Fletcher 10'; Edwards 84'	Report	Ebanks-Blake 4' (pen.); Jarvis 70'	Stadium: Bloomfield Road; Attendance: 8,906 (1,648 away fans); Referee: Kevin Friend

10 January 2009 27	Wolverhampton Wanderers	1–3	Preston North End	Wolverhampton
15:00 GMT	Ebanks-Blake 20'	Report	Elliot 24', 61'; St Ledger 41'	Stadium: Molineux; Attendance: 26,138 (1,030 away fans); Referee: Colin Webster

17 January 2009 28	Bristol City	2–2	Wolverhampton Wanderers	Bristol
17:20 GMT	Adebola 58'; Maynard 87'	Report	Collins 45'; Jarvis 54'	Stadium: Ashton Gate; Attendance: 16,749 (1,332 away fans); Referee: Mark Haywood

27 January 2009 29	Reading	1–0	Wolverhampton Wanderers	Reading
20:00 GMT	Collins 2' (o.g.)	Report		Stadium: Madejski Stadium; Attendance: 23,009 (2,000 away fans); Referee: Russell Booth

31 January 2009 30	Wolverhampton Wanderers	3–1	Watford	Wolverhampton
15:00 GMT	Ebanks-Blake 23'; Keogh 67'; Vokes 90'	Report	Mariappa 81'	Stadium: Molineux; Attendance: 23,571 (543 away fans); Referee: Nigel Miller

3 February 2009 31	Wolverhampton Wanderers	3–3	Norwich City	Wolverhampton
19:45 GMT	Ebanks-Blake 25', 54', 56'	Report	Croft 32'; Cort 47'; Doherty 65'	Stadium: Molineux; Attendance: 21,654 (211 away fans); Referee: Keith Woolmer

7 February 2009 32	Coventry City	2–1	Wolverhampton Wanderers	Coventry
15:00 GMT	Doyle 25'; McKenzie 75'	Report	Vokes 72'; Ebanks-Blake (penalty missed) 90+6'	Stadium: Ricoh Arena; Attendance: 21,167 (4,276 away fans); Referee: Michael Oliver

14 February 2009 33	Burnley	1–0	Wolverhampton Wanderers	Burnley
15:00 GMT	McCann 6'	Report		Stadium: Turf Moor; Attendance: 13,515 (1,496 away fans); Referee: Clive Oliver

22 February 2009 34	Wolverhampton Wanderers	2–2	Cardiff City	Wolverhampton
13:00 GMT	Ebanks-Blake 11'; Konstantopoulos 81' (o.g.)	Report	Chopra 31'; Johnson 48'	Stadium: Molineux; Attendance: 22,093 (1,203 away fans); Referee: Darren Deadman

28 February 2009 35	Wolverhampton Wanderers	0–1	Plymouth Argyle	Wolverhampton
15:00 GMT		Report	Gallagher 1'	Stadium: Molineux; Attendance: 25,710 (719 away fans); Referee: Carl Boyeson

3 March 2009 36	Crystal Palace	0–1	Wolverhampton Wanderers	London
20:00 GMT		Report	Ebanks-Blake 74' (pen.)	Stadium: Selhurst Park; Attendance: 14,907 (1,226 away fans); Referee: Graham Horwood

7 March 2009 37	Sheffield Wednesday	0–1	Wolverhampton Wanderers	Sheffield
15:00 GMT		Report	Ebanks-Blake 5'	Stadium: Hillsborough; Attendance: 23,703 (2,695 away fans); Referee: Scott Mathieson

10 March 2009 38	Wolverhampton Wanderers	0–0	Ipswich Town	Wolverhampton
19:45 GMT		Report		Stadium: Molineux; Attendance: 22,227 (618 away fans); Referee: Graham Salisbury

14 March 2009 39	Wolverhampton Wanderers	2–1	Charlton Athletic	Wolverhampton
15:00 GMT	Iwelumo 36'; Ebanks-Blake (penalty missed) 70' 79'	Report	Zhi 51'	Stadium: Molineux; Attendance: 24,319 (141 away fans); Referee: Graham Laws

21 March 2009 40	Nottingham Forest	0–1	Wolverhampton Wanderers	Nottingham
15:00 GMT		Report	Kightly 76'	Stadium: City Ground; Attendance: 24,510 (5,279 away fans); Referee: Phil Crossley

6 April 2009 41	Birmingham City	2–0	Wolverhampton Wanderers	Birmingham
19:45 BST	Jerome 45+4'; O'Connor 69'	Report		Stadium: St Andrew's; Attendance: 25,935 (2,700 away fans); Referee: Mark Halsey

10 April 2009 42	Wolverhampton Wanderers	3–0	Southampton	Wolverhampton
15:15 BST	Vokes 1'; Craddock 6'; Jones 19' (pen.)	Report		Stadium: Molineux; Attendance: 24,636 (823 away fans); Referee: Anthony Taylor

13 April 2009 43	Derby County	2–3	Wolverhampton Wanderers	Derby
15:00 BST	Kazmierczak 30'; Sterjovski 55'	Report	Keogh 7', 87'; Jarvis 74'	Stadium: Pride Park; Attendance: 33,079 (3,100 away fans); Referee: Paul Taylor

18 April 2009 44	Wolverhampton Wanderers	1–0	Queens Park Rangers	Wolverhampton
15:00 BST	Ebanks-Blake 46'	Report		Stadium: Molineux; Attendance: 27,511 (812 away fans); Referee: Jon Moss

25 April 2009 45	Barnsley	1–1	Wolverhampton Wanderers	Barnsley
15:00 BST	Macken 58'	Report	Reid 84'	Stadium: Oakwell; Attendance: 18,288 (5,869 away fans); Referee: Kevin Friend

3 May 2009 46	Wolverhampton Wanderers	1–0	Doncaster Rovers	Wolverhampton
13:15 BST	Stearman 90'	Report		Stadium: Molineux; Attendance: 28,252 (1,500 away fans); Referee: Richard Beeby

Final table

Pos	Team	Pld	W	D	L	GF	GA	GD	Pts
1	Wolverhampton Wanderers	46	27	9	10	80	52	+28	90
2	Birmingham City	46	23	14	9	54	37	+17	83
3	Sheffield United	46	22	14	10	64	39	+25	80

Results summary

Overall								Home						Away					
Pld	W	D	L	GF	GA	GD	Pts	W	D	L	GF	GA	GD	W	D	L	GF	GA	GD
46	27	9	10	80	52	+28	90	15	5	3	44	21	+23	12	4	7	36	31	+5

Source: Statto.com

Results by round

Round	1	2	3	4	5	6	7	8	9	10	11	12	13	14	15	16	17	18	19	20	21	22	23	24	25	26	27	28	29	30	31	32	33	34	35	36	37	38	39	40	41	42	43	44	45	46
Result	D	W	W	W	W	W	W	W	L	L	W	L	W	W	W	W	W	W	W	D	L	W	W	W	D	D	L	D	L	W	D	L	L	D	L	W	W	D	W	W	L	W	W	W	D	W
Position	10	4	2	1	1	1	1	1	1	2	1	2	2	1	1	1	1	1	1	1	1	1	1	1	1	1	1	1	1	1	1	1	1	1	1	1	1	1	1	1	1	1	1	1	1	1

Source: Statto.com
W = Win; D = Draw; L = Loss

=== FA Cup ===
13 January 2009 R3	Birmingham City	0–2	Wolverhampton Wanderers	Birmingham
19:45 GMT		Report	Keogh 38'; Vokes 51'	Stadium: St Andrew's; Attendance: 22,232 (4,024 away fans); Referee: Howard Webb

24 January 2009 R4	Wolverhampton Wanderers	1–2	Middlesbrough	Wolverhampton
15:00 GMT	Vokes 63'	Report	Alves 44'; Emnes 83'	Stadium: Molineux; Attendance: 18,013 (2,164 away fans); Referee: Rob Styles

=== League Cup ===
12 August 2008 R1	Wolverhampton Wanderers	3–2 (a.e.t.)	Accrington Stanley	Wolverhampton
19:45 BST	Iwelumo 73', 102'; Davies 106'	Report	Mullin 40'; Craney 104'	Stadium: Molineux; Attendance: 9,424; Referee: Jon Moss

26 August 2008 R2	Rotherham United	0–0 (a.e.t.) (4–3 p)	Wolverhampton Wanderers	Sheffield
19:45 BST		Report		Stadium: Don Valley Stadium; Attendance: 5,404; Referee: Neil Swarbrick
	Penalties
	Mills (penalty missed); Harrison (penalty scored); Hudson (penalty scored); Burchill (penalty scored); Reid (penalty scored)		(penalty scored) Jones; (penalty missed) Foley; (penalty scored) Iwelumo; (penalty missed) Elliott; (penalty scored) Henry

== Players ==
=== Statistics ===
Key:
‡ On loan from another club * First appearance(s) for the club

- # = Squad number
- Pos = Playing position
- P = Number of games played
- G = Number of goals scored
- GK = Goalkeeper
- DF = Defender
- MF = Midfielder
- FW = Forward
- = Yellow cards
- = Red cards
- † Permanent player left club during the season
- ¤ Loaned to another club for part or all of season

Correct as of end of season. Starting appearances are listed first, followed by substitute appearances in parentheses where applicable.

No.	Pos	Name	P	G	P	G	P	G	P	G	A yellow card	A red card	Notes
No.	Pos	Name	League		FA Cup		League Cup		Total		Discipline		Notes
1	GK	(Wales) Wayne Hennessey	34(1)	0	2	0	1	0	37(1)	0	0	1	
2	DF	(Scotland) Neill Collins	20(3)	4	2	0	2	0	24(3)	4	2	1	
3	DF	(Cameroon) George Elokobi	3(1)	0	0	0	1	0	4(1)	0	0	0	
4	MF	(Wales) David Edwards	23(21)	3	2	0	2	0	27(21)	3	3	0	
5	DF	(England) Richard Stearman	32(5)	1	1	0	2	0	35(5)	1	6	1	
6	DF	(England) Jody Craddock (c)	17	1	0	0	0	0	17	1	2	0	
7	MF	(England) Michael Kightly	37(1)	8	1(1)	0	1	0	39(2)	8	7	0	
8	MF	(England) Karl Henry	42(1)	0	2	0	2	0	44(1)	0	12	0	
9	FW	(England) Sylvan Ebanks-Blake	41	25	0(2)	0	0(1)	0	41(3)	25	2	0	
10	FW	(Republic of Ireland) Andy Keogh	21(21)	5	1(1)	1	1(1)	0	23(23)	6	3	0	
11	DF	(Republic of Ireland) Stephen Ward	38(4)	0	1	0	1	0	40(4)	0	3	0	
12	GK	(England) Shane Higgs	0	0	0	0	0	0	0	0	0	0	
13	GK	(England) Darren Ward	0	0	0	0	0	0	0	0	0	0	
14	MF	(England) David Jones	31(3)	4	2	0	0(1)	0	33(4)	4	5	0	
15	DF	(England) Mark Little ¤	0	0	0	0	0	0	0	0	0	0	
16	MF	(England) Mark Davies ¤ †	0	0	0	0	0(1)	1	0(1)	1	0	0	(Note: Davies was transferred during the season to Bolton Wanderers.)
16	DF	(Scotland) Christophe Berra	15	0	0	0	0	0	15	0	4	0	
17	MF	(England) Matt Jarvis	21(7)	3	1	0	0	0	22(7)	3	0	0	
18	FW	(Wales) Sam Vokes	4(32)	6	2	2	1	0	7(32)	8	0	0	
19	FW	(Scotland) Chris Iwelumo	25(6)	14	1(1)	0	1(1)	2	27(8)	16	4	1	
20	GK	(England) Matt Murray ¤	0	0	0	0	0	0	0	0	0	0	
21	DF	(England) Daniel Jones ¤	0	0	0	0	1	0	1	0	0	0	
22	DF	(England) Jason Shackell ¤	3(9)	0	1	0	0	0	4(9)	0	0	0	
23	DF	(England) Darren Ward ¤	0(1)	0	0	0	1	0	1(1)	0	0	0	
24	DF	(Wales) Rob Edwards †	0	0	0	0	0	0	0	0	0	0	(Note: Edwards was transferred before the season began to Blackpool.)
24	MF	(Trinidad and Tobago) Carlos Edwards	5(1)	0	0	0	0	0	5(1)	0	0	0	
24	MF	(England) Kyel Reid	3(5)	1	1	0	0	0	4(5)	1	0	0	
25	MF	(Republic of Ireland) Darren Potter ¤	0	0	0	0	0	0	0	0	0	0	
26	FW	(Republic of Ireland) Stephen Elliott †	0	0	0	0	0(1)	0	0(1)	0	0	0	(Note: Elliott was transferred during the season to Preston North End.)
26	DF	(England) Matt Hill	13	0	1	0	0	0	14	0	2	0	
27	DF	(England) Michael Mancienne	8(2)	0	0	0	0	0	8(2)	0	2	0	
27	FW	(England) Marlon Harewood	2(3)	0	0	0	0	0	2(3)	0	0	0	
28	MF	(England) George Friend	4(2)	0	1	0	0	0	5(2)	0	0	0	
29	MF	(Republic of Ireland) Stephen Gleeson ¤	0	0	0	0	0	0	0	0	0	0	
30	GK	(Nigeria) Carl Ikeme	12	0	0	0	1	0	13	0	0	0	
31	MF	(Republic of Ireland) Mark Salmon	0	0	0	0	0	0	0	0	0	0	(Note: Salmon was released during the season.)
31	GK	(Republic of Ireland) Graham Stack	0	0	0	0	0	0	0	0	0	0	
32	DF	(Republic of Ireland) Kevin Foley	45	1	0	0	2	0	47	1	3	0	
33	MF	(England) Michael Gray ¤ †	4(4)	1	0	0	2	0	6(4)	1	0	0	(Note: Gray was initially loaned to Sheffield Wednesday, and later transferred there permanently.)
34	MF	(England) Matt Bailey ¤	0	0	0	0	0	0	0	0	0	0	
35	MF	(England) Elliott Bennett ¤	0	0	0	0	0	0	0	0	0	0	
36	DF	(England) Lee Collins ¤ †	0	0	0	0	0	0	0	0	0	0	(Note: Collins was initially loaned to Port Vale, and later transferred there permanently.)
36	MF	(Scotland) Nigel Quashie	3	0	0	0	0	0	3	0	0	0	
37	FW	(England) Liam Hughes ¤	0	0	0	0	0	0	0	0	0	0	(Note: Hughes was released during the season.)
38	MF	(England) Lewis Gobern ¤	0	0	0	0	0	0	0	0	0	0	
39	MF	(England) Alex Melbourne	0	0	0	0	0	0	0	0	0	0	
40	DF	(England) Peter Williams ¤	0	0	0	0	0	0	0	0	0	0	
41	FW	(England) Ashley Hemmings ¤	0(2)	0	0	0	0	0	0(2)	0	0	0	
43	MF	(England) Kyle Bennett	0	0	0	0	0	0	0	0	0	0	
44	DF	(England) Danny Batth	0	0	0	0	0	0	0	0	0	0	
45	DF	(England) Scott Malone ¤	0	0	0	0	0	0	0	0	0	0	

=== Awards ===
Award	Winner
Fans' Player of the Season	Kevin Foley
Players' Player of the Season	Sylvan Ebanks-Blake
Young Player of the Season	Sam Vokes
Academy Player of the Season	Scott Malone
Goal of the Season	Andy Keogh (vs Derby County, 13 April 2009)

== Transfers ==
=== In ===
Date	Player	From	Fee
23 May 2008	(Wales) Sam Vokes	Bournemouth	£1,200,000
25 June 2008	(England) Richard Stearman	Leicester City	£1.6 million
27 June 2008	(England) David Jones	Derby County	£1.2 million
14 July 2008	(Scotland) Chris Iwelumo	Charlton Athletic	£400,000
1 September 2008	(England) Jason Shackell	Norwich City	£1 million
1 September 2008	(England) Matt Hill	Preston North End	Undisclosed
1 September 2008	(England) George Friend	Exeter City	£350,000
2 February 2009	(Scotland) Christophe Berra	(Scotland) Hearts	£2.3 million

=== Out ===
Date	Player	To	Fee
June 2008	(Republic of Ireland) Gary Breen	Released	Free
June 2008	(England) Keith Lowe	Released	Free
June 2008	(Egypt) Sam Morsy	Released	Free
June 2008	(England) Martin Riley	Released	Free
12 July 2008	(Wales) Freddy Eastwood	Coventry City	£1.2 million
15 July 2008	(Scotland) Charlie Mulgrew	(Scotland) Aberdeen	£150,000
26 July 2008	(Nigeria) Seyi Olofinjana	Stoke City	£3 million
4 August 2008	(England) Jay Bothroyd	(Wales) Cardiff City	£350,000
6 August 2008	(Wales) Rob Edwards	Blackpool	Undisclosed
1 September 2008	(Republic of Ireland) Stephen Elliott	Preston North End	Undisclosed
January 2009	(England) Liam Hughes	Released	Free
January 2009	(Republic of Ireland) Mark Salmon	Released	Free
13 January 2009	(Hungary) Dénes Rósa	Released	Free
16 January 2009	(England) Lee Collins	Port Vale	Free
26 January 2009	(England) Mark Davies	Bolton Wanderers	Undisclosed
2 February 2009	(England) Michael Gray	Sheffield Wednesday	Free

=== Loans in ===
Start date	Player	From	End date
2 October 2008	(Trinidad and Tobago) Carlos Edwards	Sunderland	20 November 2008
27 October 2008	(England) Michael Mancienne	Chelsea	2 January 2009
27 November 2008	(England) Shane Higgs	Cheltenham Town	End of season
January 2009	(Hungary) Krisztián Simon	(Hungary) Újpest	End of season
15 January 2009	(England) Kyel Reid	West Ham United	End of season
22 January 2009	(Scotland) Nigel Quashie	West Ham United	End of season
2 March 2009	(Wales) Darren Ward	Sunderland	End of season
23 March 2009	(England) Marlon Harewood	Aston Villa	End of season
26 March 2009	(England) Graham Stack	Plymouth Argyle	End of season

=== Loans out ===
Start date	Player	To	End date
23 July 2008	(England) Matt Bailey	Burton Albion	January 2009
29 July 2008	(England) Elliott Bennett	Bury	End of season
31 July 2008	(England) Lee Collins	Port Vale	15 January 2009
8 August 2008	(Republic of Ireland) Stephen Gleeson	Stockport County	January 2009
22 August 2008	(England) Mark Little	Northampton Town	22 October 2008
18 September 2008	(England) Darren Ward	Watford	29 November 2008
3 October 2009	(England) Daniel Jones	Oldham Athletic	20 December 2008
7 November 2008	(England) Peter Williams	Kettering Town	30 November 2008
12 November 2008	(England) Matt Murray	Hereford United	12 December 2008
27 November 2008	(England) Mark Davies	Leicester City	24 January 2009
9 January 2009	(England) Michael Gray	Sheffield Wednesday	2 February 2009
15 January 2009	(Republic of Ireland) Darren Potter	Sheffield Wednesday	End of season
15 January 2009	(England) Lewis Gobern	Colchester United	End of season
30 January 2009	(England) Darren Ward	Charlton Athletic	End of season
2 February 2009	(England) Daniel Jones	Oldham Athletic	End of season
10 February 2009	(England) Jason Shackell	Norwich City	End of season
23 February 2009	(England) Ashley Hemmings	Cheltenham Town	23 March 2009
25 March 2009	(Republic of Ireland) Stephen Gleeson	Milton Keynes Dons	End of season

== Management and coaching staff ==
Position	Name
Manager	Mick McCarthy
Assistant manager	Terry Connor
Fitness coach	Tony Daley
Goalkeeping coach	Pat Mountain
Development Coach, 18–21's	Steve Weaver
Academy Manager	Kevin Thelwell
Assistant Academy Manager / Under-18's coach	John Perkins
Club Doctor	Dr Matthew Perry
Head of medical department	Steve Kemp
Club Physio	Alan Peacham

== Kit ==
The season saw a new home and away kit, both manufactured by Le Coq Sportif. The away kit was all black with minor neon green piping. Chaucer Consulting sponsored the club for a fifth and final season.
