= 2007–08 Wolverhampton Wanderers F.C. season =

English football club season

Wolverhampton Wanderers
2007–08 season
- Chairman: Steve Morgan OBE
- Manager: Mick McCarthy
- Football League Championship: 7th
- FA Cup: 5th round
- League Cup: 2nd round
- Top goalscorer: League: Sylvan Ebanks-Blake (12); All: Sylvan Ebanks-Blake (12)
- Highest home attendance: 27,883 (vs. West Bromwich Albion, 15 April 2008)
- Lowest home attendance: 9,625 (vs. Bradford City, 15 August 2007)
- Average home league attendance: 23,496
Home colours	Away colours	Third colours

The 2007–08 season was the 109th season of competitive league football in the history of English football club Wolverhampton Wanderers. They played the season in the 2nd tier of the English Football system, the Football League Championship. The season saw them finish seventh, narrowly missing out on a play-off place only by virtue of goal difference.

This season was the first under the ownership of Steve Morgan, ending the seventeen-year reign of Sir Jack Hayward. Morgan had bought the club for the nominal sum of £10, with the proviso that he invested £30 million into the club.

== Season review ==
The close season saw businessman Steve Morgan take control of the club for a nominal £10 fee in return for a £30 million investment into the club, resulting in the departure of Sir Jack Hayward after 17 years as chairman. The protracted takeover, originally announced in May, was finally completed on 9 August 2007. The announcement of the deal saw the club set out their future ethos:

It is intended that the new capital, over a period of time, will be used to help re-establish Wolves as a Premiership club. Although this is a significant amount of money there will not be an 'open cheque book' approach to signing players; instead the club will build on the current strategy of steadily and progressively developing a team of young, hungry and talented players. — Club Statement

After last season's unexpected play-off finish, hopes were high for the club to go one step further this time, with manager stating automatic promotion was his aim. The side was strengthened by signing Freddy Eastwood, Stephen Elliott and Michael Gray, but last season's Player of the Year, goalkeeper Matt Murray - who had only just recovered from a broken shoulder - missed the whole campaign after suffering a knee injury in pre-season training.

On the field, the team started the season inconsistently, but a strong October and November saw them push as high as third, just three points from the summit. However, an injury suffered by key player Michael Kightly seemed to severely weaken the team's creativity and preceded a dismal Christmas period that saw them pick up just 4 points from a possible 21, leaving them mid-table and without hopes of an automatic finish.

More players were brought in during the January transfer window, most crucially striker Sylvan Ebanks-Blake from Plymouth Argyle, who scored 12 goals in the remainder of the season, finishing the division's top scorer on 23 goals. However, his goals alone could not bring about a second successive play-off finish as the side finished outside the final spot on goal difference, two goals short of Watford. Despite suffering just two defeats in their final 15 games, several crucial late goals that were conceded in the second half of the season ultimately proved costly. Indeed, just two more goals on the final day of the season would have booked them a playoff place.

== Results ==
=== Preseason ===
14 July 2007	Grays Athletic	0–0	Wolverhampton Wanderers	Grays
15:15 BST		Report		Stadium: New Recreation Ground; Attendance: 2,172; Referee: Fred Graham

18 July 2007	Bray Wanderers	0–4	Wolverhampton Wanderers	Bray
19:45 BST		Report	Eastwood 62', 80'; Bothroyd 70', 72'	Stadium: Carlisle Grounds; Attendance: 3,500; Referee: Richie Winter

22 July 2007	Bohemians	1–1	Wolverhampton Wanderers	Dublin
15:00 BST	Mansaram 6'	Report	S. Ward 79'	Stadium: Dalymount Park; Referee: Thomas Connolly

25 July 2007	Doncaster Rovers	1–0	Wolverhampton Wanderers	Doncaster
19:30 BST	Hayter 8' (pen.)	Report		Stadium: Keepmoat Stadium; Attendance: 2,959; Referee: Eddie Ilderton

28 July 2007	Cheltenham Town	1–3	Wolverhampton Wanderers	Cheltenham
15:00 BST	Lindegaard 41'	Report	Elliott 28'; Kightly 38'; Collins 53'	Stadium: Whaddon Road; Attendance: 1,673; Referee: Andy Penn

31 July 2007	Northampton Town	0–3	Wolverhampton Wanderers	Northampton
19:45 BST		Report	D. Ward 22'; Keogh 31' (pen.); Eastwood 89'	Stadium: Sixfields Stadium; Attendance: 2,358 (978 away); Referee: Andy Woolmer

3 August 2007	Hereford United	2–3	Wolverhampton Wanderers	Hereford
19:45 BST	Robinson 2'; Ainsworth 9'	Report	Bennett 5'; Bothroyd 36'; Jones 69'	Stadium: Edgar Street; Attendance: 1,213; Referee: Steve Bratt

4 August 2007	Wolverhampton Wanderers	2–3	Reading	Wolverhampton
15:00 BST	Olofinjana 14'; Bothroyd 84'	Report	Hunt 17'; Gunnarsson 32'; Kitson 45'	Stadium: Molineux; Attendance: 7,216 (204 away); Referee: Tony Bates

"Wolves XI" pre season results: 0–0 v Brighton & Hove Albion (26 July; home), 7–0 v Holyhead Hotspur (28 July; away)

=== Football League Championship ===
A total of 24 teams competed in the Championship in the 2007–08 season. Each team would play every other team twice, once at their stadium, and once at the opposition's. Three points were awarded to teams for each win, one point per draw, and none for defeats. The provisional fixture list was released on 14 June 2007, but was subject to change in the event of matches being selected for television coverage.

11 August 2007 1	Wolverhampton Wanderers	1–2	Watford	Wolverhampton
17:20 BST	Olofinjana 45+1'	Report	Stewart 87'; King 90+5' (pen.)	Stadium: Molineux; Attendance: 23,115 (1,116 away fans); Referee: Neil Swarbrick

19 August 2007 2	Sheffield Wednesday	1–3	Wolverhampton Wanderers	Sheffield
13:30 BST	Small 45+4'	Report	Eastwood 14'; Kightly 48'; Bothroyd 90+2'	Stadium: Hillsborough; Attendance: 22,131 (1,843 away fans); Referee: Peter Walton

25 August 2007 3	Wolverhampton Wanderers	2–1	Blackpool	Wolverhampton
15:00 BST	Eastwood 69', 78'	Report	Taylor-Fletcher 51'	Stadium: Molineux; Attendance: 24,294 (2,007 away fans); Referee: Trevor Kettle

1 September 2007 4	Stoke City	0–0	Wolverhampton Wanderers	Stoke-on-Trent
15:00 BST		Report		Stadium: Britannia Stadium; Attendance: 17,135 (2,979 away fans); Referee: Lee Mason

15 September 2007 5	Sheffield United	3–1	Wolverhampton Wanderers	Sheffield
15:00 BST	Beattie 57', 83' (pen.); Stead 90+3'	Report	Elliott 24'	Stadium: Bramall Lane; Attendance: 26,003 (3,000 away fans); Referee: Clive Oliver

18 September 2007 6	Wolverhampton Wanderers	0–1	Hull City	Wolverhampton
19:45 BST		Report	Windass 49' (pen.)	Stadium: Molineux; Attendance: 21,352 (285 away fans); Referee: Mike Jones

22 September 2007 7	Wolverhampton Wanderers	2–0	Norwich City	Wolverhampton
15:00 BST	Foley 23'; Keogh 35'	Report		Stadium: Molineux; Attendance: 22,564 (1,205 away fans); Referee: Steve Bennett

29 September 2007 8	Plymouth Argyle	1–1	Wolverhampton Wanderers	Plymouth
15:00 BST	Chadwick 61'	Report	Elliott 41'	Stadium: Home Park; Attendance: 13,638 (1,138 away fans); Referee: Phil Joslin

2 October 2007 9	Leicester City	0–0	Wolverhampton Wanderers	Leicester
19:45 BST		Report		Stadium: Walkers Stadium; Attendance: 21,311 (2,404 away fans); Referee: Tony Bates

6 October 2007 10	Wolverhampton Wanderers	1–0	Coventry City	Wolverhampton
15:00 BST	Collins 90+4'	Report		Stadium: Molineux; Attendance: 24,338 (2,339 away fans); Referee: Keith Stroud

20 October 2007 11	Wolverhampton Wanderers	2–0	Charlton Athletic	Wolverhampton
15:00 BST	Bothroyd 46'; Henry 85'	Report		Stadium: Molineux; Attendance: 24,058 (726 away fans); Referee: Richard Beeby

24 October 2007 12	Cardiff City	2–3	Wolverhampton Wanderers	Cardiff
19:45 BST	Fowler 25' (pen.); Hasselbaink 29'	Report	Kightly 13', 66'; Craddock 74'	Stadium: Ninian Park; Attendance: 15,000 (1,455 away fans); Referee: Paul Taylor

27 October 2007 13	Ipswich Town	3–0	Wolverhampton Wanderers	Ipswich
15:00 BST	Lee 42'; Couñago 52'; Haynes 90+1'	Report	Eastwood (penalty missed) 7'	Stadium: Portman Road; Attendance: 23,308 (973 away fans); Referee: Keith Woolmer

3 November 2007 14	Wolverhampton Wanderers	1–1	Bristol City	Wolverhampton
15:00 GMT	Bothroyd 22'	Report	Fontaine 27'	Stadium: Molineux; Attendance: 26,094 (2,600 away fans); Referee: Kevin Friend

6 November 2007 15	Southampton	0–0	Wolverhampton Wanderers	Southampton
19:45 GMT		Report		Stadium: St Mary's Stadium; Attendance: 19,856 (2,064 away fans); Referee: Darren Deadman

10 November 2007 16	Wolverhampton Wanderers	1–0	Barnsley	Wolverhampton
15:00 GMT	Collins 13'	Report		Stadium: Molineux; Attendance: 22,231 (636 away fans); Referee: Graham Laws

25 November 2007 17	West Bromwich Albion	0–0	Wolverhampton Wanderers	West Bromwich
12:00 GMT	Gera (penalty missed) 85'	Report		Stadium: The Hawthorns; Attendance: 27,493 (2,600 away fans); Referee: Chris Foy

28 November 2007 18	Wolverhampton Wanderers	1–0	Colchester United	Wolverhampton
19:45 GMT	Elliott 32'	Report		Stadium: Molineux; Attendance: 20,966 (222 away fans); Referee: Eddie Ilderton

1 December 2007 19	Wolverhampton Wanderers	1–0	Preston North End	Wolverhampton
15:00 GMT	Henry 55'	Report		Stadium: Molineux; Attendance: 22,836 (1,065 away fans); Referee: Andy D'Urso

4 December 2007 20	Barnsley	1–0	Wolverhampton Wanderers	Barnsley
19:45 GMT	Ferenczi 47'	Report	Keogh (penalty missed) 50'	Stadium: Oakwell; Attendance: 9,956 (361 away fans); Referee: Graham Salisbury

8 December 2007 21	Wolverhampton Wanderers	2–3	Burnley	Wolverhampton
15:00 GMT	Gibson 24'; Elliott 60' (pen.)	Report	Blake 20'; Lafferty 30'; D. Ward 42' (o.g.)	Stadium: Molineux; Attendance: 20,763 (672 away fans); Referee: Steve Tanner

15 December 2007 22	Queens Park Rangers	0–0	Wolverhampton Wanderers	London
15:00 GMT		Report		Stadium: Loftus Road; Attendance: 13,482 (2,600 away fans); Referee: Fred Graham

22 December 2007 23	Wolverhampton Wanderers	1–1	Leicester City	Wolverhampton
17:20 GMT	Jarvis 73'	Report	Hume 4'	Stadium: Molineux; Attendance: 23,477 (989 away fans); Referee: Neil Swarbrick

26 December 2007 24	Hull City	2–0	Wolverhampton Wanderers	Hull
15:00 GMT	Garcia 47'; Campbell 61'	Report		Stadium: KC Stadium; Attendance: 19,127 (1,005 away fans); Referee: Chris Foy

29 December 2007 25	Norwich City	1–1	Wolverhampton Wanderers	Norwich
15:00 GMT	Cureton 75'	Report	Keogh 52'	Stadium: Carrow Road; Attendance: 24,300 (811 away fans); Referee: Lee Probert

1 January 2008 26	Wolverhampton Wanderers	0–0	Sheffield United	Wolverhampton
15:00 GMT		Report		Stadium: Molineux; Attendance: 24,791 (2,184 away fans); Referee: Lee Mason

12 January 2008 27	Wolverhampton Wanderers	0–3	Crystal Palace	Wolverhampton
15:00 GMT		Report	Morrison 24'; Scannell 49'; Scowcroft 66'	Stadium: Molineux; Attendance: 22,650 (812 away fans); Referee: Howard Webb

19 January 2008 28	Scunthorpe United	0–2	Wolverhampton Wanderers	Scunthorpe
15:00 GMT		Report	D. Edwards 8'; Ebanks-Blake 46'	Stadium: Glanford Park; Attendance: 7,465 (1,800 away fans); Referee: Mike Russell

29 January 2008 29	Wolverhampton Wanderers	2–1	Sheffield Wednesday	Wolverhampton
19:45 GMT	Keogh 11'; Ebanks-Blake 90+1'	Report	Tudgay 19'	Stadium: Molineux; Attendance: 22,746 (544 away fans); Referee: Phil Joslin

2 February 2008 30	Watford	3–0	Wolverhampton Wanderers	Watford
17:20 GMT	Kabba 1'; Smith 76', 78'	Report		Stadium: Vicarage Road; Attendance: 18,082 (2,146 away fans); Referee: Lee Probert

9 February 2008 31	Wolverhampton Wanderers	2–4	Stoke City	Wolverhampton
15:00 GMT	R. Edwards 45+1'; Keogh 47'	Report	Delap 4'; Lawrence 49'; Cort 74'; Fuller 90+4'	Stadium: Molineux; Attendance: 25,373 (2,596 away fans); Referee: Andre Marriner

12 February 2008 32	Blackpool	0–0	Wolverhampton Wanderers	Blackpool
19:45 GMT		Report		Stadium: Bloomfield Road; Attendance: 9,413 (1,233 away fans); Referee: Lee Mason

23 February 2008 33	Crystal Palace	0–2	Wolverhampton Wanderers	London
15:00 GMT		Report	Gray 76'; Kyle 89'	Stadium: Selhurst Park; Attendance: 15,679 (475 away fans); Referee: Andy Woolmer

1 March 2008 34	Colchester United	0–1	Wolverhampton Wanderers	Colchester
15:00 GMT		Report	Ebanks-Blake 30'	Stadium: Layer Road; Attendance: 5,989 (1,000 away fans); Referee: Iain Williamson

4 March 2008 35	Wolverhampton Wanderers	2–2	Southampton	Wolverhampton
19:45 GMT	Ebanks-Blake 61', 88'	Report	Vignal 75' (pen.); Euell 90+4'	Stadium: Molineux; Attendance: 21,795 (389 away fans); Referee: Colin Webster

11 March 2008 36	Preston North End	2–1	Wolverhampton Wanderers	Preston
19:45 GMT	Davidson 60' (pen.); Whaley 81'	Report	Keogh 52'	Stadium: Deepdale; Attendance: 12,090 (1,612 away fans); Referee: Jon Moss

15 March 2008 37	Burnley	1–3	Wolverhampton Wanderers	Burnley
15:00 GMT	Akinbiyi 76'	Report	Olofinjana 14'; Gray 16'; Ebanks-Blake 56'	Stadium: Turf Moor; Attendance: 12,749 (1,209 away fans); Referee: Peter Walton

18 March 2008 38	Wolverhampton Wanderers	2–1	Scunthorpe United	Wolverhampton
19:45 GMT	Gray 57'; Collins 83'	Report	Butler 5'	Stadium: Molineux; Attendance: 21,628 (506 away fans); Referee: Mark Haywood

22 March 2008 39	Wolverhampton Wanderers	3–3	Queens Park Rangers	Wolverhampton
15:00 GMT	Keogh 45', 90+6'; Ebanks-Blake 67' (pen.)	Report	Buzsáky 28'; Blackstock 49' (pen.); Leigertwood 79'	Stadium: Molineux; Attendance: 24,290 (1,363 away fans); Referee: Clive Oliver

29 March 2008 40	Charlton Athletic	2–3	Wolverhampton Wanderers	London
17:20 GMT	Halford 31'; Lita 90+2'	Report	Ebanks-Blake 15', 81'; Henry 90+4'	Stadium: The Valley; Attendance: 23,187 (2,388 away fans); Referee: Keith Stroud

12 April 2008 41	Bristol City	0–0	Wolverhampton Wanderers	Bristol
15:00 BST		Report		Stadium: Ashton Gate; Attendance: 19,332 (2,103 away fans); Referee: Paul Taylor

15 April 2008 42	Wolverhampton Wanderers	0–1	West Bromwich Albion	Wolverhampton
19:45 BST		Report	Gera 59'	Stadium: Molineux; Attendance: 27,883 (2,600 away fans); Referee: Mark Clattenburg

19 April 2008 43	Wolverhampton Wanderers	1–1	Ipswich Town	Wolverhampton
15:00 BST	Ebanks-Blake 73'	Report	Miller 90+4'	Stadium: Molineux; Attendance: 26,072 (2,421 away fans); Referee: Scott Mathieson

22 April 2008 44	Wolverhampton Wanderers	3–0	Cardiff City	Wolverhampton
19:45 BST	Keogh 8'; Ebanks-Blake 44'; Kightly 56'	Report		Stadium: Molineux; Attendance: 20,862 (642 away fans); Referee: Mark Halsey

26 April 2008 45	Coventry City	1–1	Wolverhampton Wanderers	Coventry
15:00 BST	Ward 18'	Report	Ebanks-Blake 53' (pen.)	Stadium: Ricoh Arena; Attendance: 27,992 (4,701 away fans); Referee: Paul Armstrong

4 May 2008 46	Wolverhampton Wanderers	1–0	Plymouth Argyle	Wolverhampton
14:00 BST	Olofinjana 87'	Report		Stadium: Molineux; Attendance: 26,293 (1,276 away fans); Referee: Mike Pike

Final table

Pos	Team	Pld	W	D	L	GF	GA	GD	Pts
1	West Bromwich Albion	46	23	12	11	88	55	+33	81
2	Stoke City	46	21	16	9	69	55	+14	79
3	Hull City	46	21	12	13	65	47	+18	75
4	Bristol City	46	20	14	12	54	53	+1	74
5	Crystal Palace	46	18	17	11	58	42	+16	71
6	Watford	46	18	16	12	62	56	+6	70
7	Wolverhampton Wanderers	46	18	16	12	53	48	+5	70

Results summary

Overall								Home						Away					
Pld	W	D	L	GF	GA	GD	Pts	W	D	L	GF	GA	GD	W	D	L	GF	GA	GD
46	18	16	12	53	48	+5	70	11	6	6	31	25	+6	7	10	6	22	23	−1

Source: Statto.com

Results by round

Round	1	2	3	4	5	6	7	8	9	10	11	12	13	14	15	16	17	18	19	20	21	22	23	24	25	26	27	28	29	30	31	32	33	34	35	36	37	38	39	40	41	42	43	44	45	46
Result	L	W	W	D	L	L	W	D	D	W	W	W	L	D	D	W	D	W	W	L	L	D	D	L	D	D	L	W	W	L	L	D	W	W	D	L	W	W	D	W	D	L	D	W	D	W
Position	18	10	2	5	10	15	11	12	11	7	4	3	5	5	6	5	5	4	3	6	6	8	7	8	9	10	12	10	9	11	12	12	10	10	10	11	11	8	9	6	7	8	9	7	7	7

Source: Statto.com
W = Win; D = Draw; L = Loss

=== FA Cup ===
5 January 2008 R3	Wolverhampton Wanderers	2–1	Cambridge United	Wolverhampton
14:00 GMT	Kightly 69'; Collins 88'	Report	Rendell 42' (pen.)	Stadium: Molineux; Attendance: 15,340 (3,723 away fans); Referee: Kevin Friend

26 January 2008 R4	Watford	1–4	Wolverhampton Wanderers	Watford
15:00 GMT	O'Toole 70'	Report	Keogh 5', 90'; Elliott 58'; Bothroyd 68'	Stadium: Vicarage Road; Attendance: 12,719 (2,268 away fans); Referee: Keith Stroud

16 February 2008 R5	Cardiff City	2–0	Wolverhampton Wanderers	Cardiff
15:00 GMT	Whittingham 2'; Hasselbaink 11'	Report		Stadium: Ninian Park; Attendance: 15,339 (1,600 away fans); Referee: Rob Styles

=== League Cup ===
15 August 2007 R1	Wolverhampton Wanderers	2–1	Bradford City	Wolverhampton
19:45 BST	Eastwood 46'; Craddock 49'	Report	Nix 77'	Stadium: Molineux; Attendance: 9,625 (610 away fans); Referee: Scott Mathieson

28 August 2007 R2	Wolverhampton Wanderers	1–3 (a.e.t.)	Morecambe	Wolverhampton
19:45 BST	Keogh 84' (pen.)	Report	Baker 62' (pen.); Newby 92'; Thompson 105'	Stadium: Molineux; Attendance: 11,296 (1,285 away fans); Referee: Anthony Taylor

== Players ==
=== Statistics ===
Key:
‡ On loan from another club * First appearance(s) for the club

- # = Squad number
- Pos = Playing position
- P = Number of games played
- G = Number of goals scored
- GK = Goalkeeper
- DF = Defender
- MF = Midfielder
- FW = Forward
- = Yellow cards
- = Red cards
- † Permanent player left club during the season
- ¤ Loaned to another club for part or all of season

Correct as of end of season. Starting appearances are listed first, followed by substitute appearances in parentheses where applicable.

No.	Pos	Name	P	G	P	G	P	G	P	G	A yellow card	A red card	Notes
No.	Pos	Name	League		FA Cup		League Cup		Total		Discipline		Notes
1	GK	(England) Matt Murray	0	0	0	0	0	0	0	0	0	0	
2	DF	(England) Darren Ward	30	0	2	0	0	0	32	0	1	0	
3	DF	(Scotland) Neill Collins	34(4)	3	2	1	1	0	37(4)	4	5	0	
4	MF	(Nigeria) Seyi Olofinjana	34(1)	3	1	0	0	0	35(1)	3	8	0	
5	DF	(Republic of Ireland) Gary Breen (c)	18(1)	0	1	0	0	0	19(1)	0	3	0	
6	DF	(England) Jody Craddock ¤	22(1)	1	1	0	1	1	24(1)	2	2	0	
7	MF	(England) Michael Kightly	20(1)	4	0(2)	1	1(1)	0	21(4)	5	1	0	
8	MF	(England) Karl Henry	38(2)	3	2	0	2	0	42(2)	3	8	0	
9	FW	(Republic of Ireland) Andy Keogh	33(10)	8	3	2	2	1	38(10)	11	2	0	
10	FW	(England) Jay Bothroyd ¤	13(9)	3	3	1	0	0	16(9)	4	3	0	
11	DF	(Republic of Ireland) Stephen Ward	23(6)	0	1	0	0(1)	0	24(7)	0	3	0	
12	DF	(Wales) Rob Edwards	4(4)	1	1(1)	0	2	0	7(5)	1	3	0	
14	MF	(Republic of Ireland) Darren Potter	11(7)	0	3	0	1(1)	0	15(8)	0	3	0	
15	DF	(England) Mark Little ¤	0(1)	0	0	0	0	0	0(1)	0	0	0	
16	MF	(England) Mark Davies	0	0	0	0	0	0	0	0	0	0	
17	MF	(England) Matt Jarvis	17(9)	1	2	0	0	0	19(9)	1	0	0	
18	MF	(Republic of Ireland) Stephen Gleeson ¤	0	0	0	0	1	0	1	0	0	0	
19	FW	(Republic of Ireland) Stephen Elliott	18(11)	4	1(1)	1	0	0	19(12)	5	0	0	
20	DF	(Scotland) Charlie Mulgrew ¤	0	0	0	0	2	0	2	0	0	0	
21	DF	(England) Daniel Jones ¤	0(1)	0	0	0	0	0	0(1)	0	0	0	
22	MF	(England) Lewis Gobern	0	0	0	0	0	0	0	0	0	0	
23	FW	(Wales) Freddy Eastwood	10(21)	3	0(2)	0	2	1	12(23)	4	1	0	
24	MF	(Republic of Ireland) Darron Gibson	15(6)	1	1(2)	0	0	0	16(8)	1	5	0	
25	GK	(Republic of Ireland) Graham Stack	0(2)	0	0	0	2	0	2(2)	0	0	0	
26	MF	(Wales) David Edwards	10	1	0	0	0	0	10	1	0	0	
27	FW	(England) Sylvan Ebanks-Blake	20	12	0	0	0	0	20	12	2	0	
28	DF	(England) Jamie Clapham ¤ †	0	0	0	0	0(1)	0	0(1)	0	0	0	
29	MF	(Republic of Ireland) Kevin O'Connor	0	0	0	0	0	0	0	0	0	0	
30	GK	(Nigeria) Carl Ikeme	0	0	0	0	0	0	0	0	0	0	
31	GK	(Wales) Wayne Hennessey	46	0	3	0	0	0	49	0	0	0	
32	DF	(Republic of Ireland) Kevin Foley	42(2)	1	3	0	2	0	47(2)	1	1	0	
33	MF	(England) Michael Gray	29(4)	3	2(1)	0	1	0	32(5)	3	3	0	
34	MF	(England) Martin Riley †	0	0	0	0	0	0	0	0	0	0	
34	FW	(Scotland) Kevin Kyle	3(9)	1	1	0	0	0	4(9)	1	0	0	
35	MF	(England) Elliott Bennett ¤	0	0	0	0	2	0	2	0	0	0	
36	DF	(England) Lee Collins ¤	0	0	0	0	0	0	0	0	0	0	
37	FW	(England) Liam Hughes ¤	0	0	0	0	0	0	0	0	0	0	
38	MF	(Republic of Ireland) Mark Salmon ¤	0	0	0	0	0	0	0	0	0	0	
39	MF	(Hungary) Dénes Rósa	0	0	0	0	0(1)	0	0(1)	0	0	0	
40	DF	(Cameroon) George Elokobi	15	0	0	0	0	0	15	0	3	0	
41	DF	(England) Matt Bailey ¤	0	0	0	0	0	0	0	0	0	0	

=== Awards ===
Award	Winner
Fans' Player of the Season	Wayne Hennessey
Players' Player of the Season	Wayne Hennessey
Young Player of the Season	Elliott Bennett
Academy Player of the Season	Ashley Hemmings
Goal of the Season	Sylvan Ebanks-Blake (Second goal vs Charlton Athletic, 29 March 2008)

== Transfers ==
=== In ===
Date	Player	From	Fee
20 June 2007	(England) Matt Jarvis	Gillingham	Undisclosed
3 July 2007	(England) Darren Ward	Crystal Palace	Undisclosed
6 July 2007	(Wales) Freddy Eastwood	Southend United	£1.5 million
17 July 2007	(Republic of Ireland) Stephen Elliott	Sunderland	£750,000
25 July 2007	(England) Michael Gray	Unattached	Free
14 August 2007	(Republic of Ireland) Kevin Foley	Luton Town	Undisclosed
11 January 2008	(England) Sylvan Ebanks-Blake	Plymouth Argyle	£1.5 million
14 January 2008	(Wales) David Edwards	Luton Town	£675,000
31 January 2008	(Cameroon) George Elokobi	Colchester United	Undisclosed

=== Out ===
Date	Player	To	Fee
18 May 2007	(Scotland) Jackie McNamara	(Scotland) Aberdeen	Free
8 June 2007	(Guyana) Carl Cort	Leicester City	Free
June 2007	(England) Michael Oakes	Released	Free
June 2007	(England) Rohan Ricketts	Released	Free
12 July 2007	(Scotland) Michael McIndoe	Bristol City	Undisclosed
31 August 2007	(United States) Jemal Johnson	Milton Keynes Dons	Undisclosed
31 August 2007	(Poland) Tomasz Frankowski	Released	Free
3 December 2007	(England) Martin Riley	Released	Free
31 January 2008	(England) Jamie Clapham	Leicester City	Free

=== Loans in ===
Start date	Player	From	End date
9 August 2007	(Republic of Ireland) Graham Stack	Reading	End of season
19 October 2007	(Republic of Ireland) Darron Gibson	Manchester United	End of season
30 January 2008	(Scotland) Kevin Kyle	Coventry City	End of season

=== Loans out ===
Start date	Player	To	End date
8 June 2007	(England) Keith Lowe	Port Vale	End of season
3 August 2007	(England) Daniel Jones	Northampton Town	26 January 2008
17 August 2007	(England) Jody Craddock	Stoke City	19 September 2007
20 August 2007	(England) Jamie Clapham	Leeds United	21 November 2007
25 October 2007	(England) Elliott Bennett	Crewe Alexandra	3 January 2008
14 November 2007	(England) Lee Collins	Hereford United	End of season
22 November 2007	(Republic of Ireland) Mark Salmon	Port Vale	6 January 2008
22 November 2007	(England) Liam Hughes	Bury	2 January 2008
10 January 2008	(England) Mark Little	Northampton Town	12 March 2008
31 January 2008	(England) Elliott Bennett	Bury	End of season
31 January 2008	(Scotland) Charlie Mulgrew	Southend United	End of season
31 January 2008	(England) Matt Bailey	Kidderminster Harriers	27 February 2008
21 February 2008	(Republic of Ireland) Stephen Gleeson	Hereford United	23 March 2008
29 February 2008	(England) Liam Hughes	Stafford Rangers	16 March 2008
6 March 2008	(England) Daniel Jones	Northampton Town	End of season
14 March 2008	(England) Jay Bothroyd	Stoke City	End of season
27 March 2008	(Republic of Ireland) Stephen Gleeson	Stockport County	End of season

== Kit ==
The season saw a new away kit, navy blue with an old gold and white trim. The home kit remained the same as the previous campaign and that season's white away kit was retained as a third kit for this term. The kits were manufactured by Le Coq Sportif, Chaucer Consulting sponsored the club for a fourth season.
