= Jody Craddock =

English footballer and artist

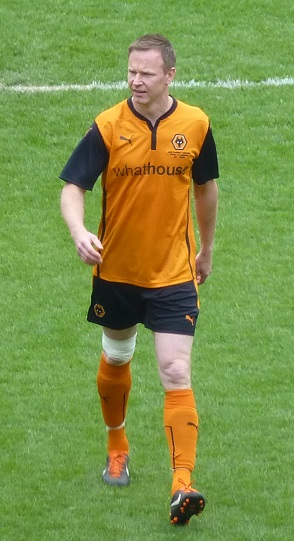
- Craddock during his testimonial game in 2014

Personal information
- Full name: Jody Darryl Craddock
- Date of birth: 25 July 1975 (age 51)
- Place of birth: Redditch, England
- Height: 1.85 m (6 ft 1 in)
- Position: Centre back

Senior career*
Years	Team	Apps	(Gls)
1992–1993	Christchurch		
1993–1997	Cambridge United	145	(4)
1993–1994	→ Woking (loan)	7	(2)
1997–2003	Sunderland	146	(2)
1999	→ Sheffield United (loan)	10	(0)
2003–2013	Wolverhampton Wanderers	215	(14)
2007	→ Stoke City (loan)	4	(0)
Total		527	(22)
- * Club domestic league appearances and goals

Jody Darryl Craddock (born 25 July 1975) is an English former professional footballer and artist who played as a centre back in the Premier League for Sunderland and Wolverhampton Wanderers.

Craddock broke into league football at Cambridge United in the mid-1990s before spending six years at Sunderland, with whom he won promotion to the top flight. When they were relegated in 2003 he switched to newly promoted Wolverhampton Wanderers where he eventually became club captain and made 237 appearances during a ten-year stay.

== Career ==
=== Cambridge United ===
Born in Redditch, Craddock started his career at non-league Christchurch before earning a move to third tier Cambridge United in August 1993 on a free transfer. He made his league debut on 11 December 1993 in a 0–0 draw with Stockport County.

=== Sunderland ===
After four seasons at Cambridge, his talent was noted by Sunderland and he joined for £300,000 in August 1997. His second season with the Black Cats saw him help them to promotion to the top level, however, he ended up spending part of their first Premier League campaign on loan at Sheffield United.

=== Wolverhampton Wanderers ===
When Sunderland were relegated after four seasons in the Premier League in 2003, Craddock was sold to newly promoted Wolves for £1.75 million to replace the injured Joleon Lescott at centre back.

He was made captain at the start of the 2006–07 season by new manager Mick McCarthy. He found himself sent to Stoke City on loan in August 2007 though, but this spell was cut short through the emergency 24-hour clause the following month.

His 2008–09 season was interrupted when he broke a metatarsal in his foot in just the second league game, ruling him out for several months. After months of rehabilitation, Craddock was on the verge of a loan move, however injuries and loans meant that he stayed with the club. After a poor run of form for Richard Stearman, Craddock found himself once again in Wolves' first team, where he remained as the side went on to win the division and a return to the Premier League. He lifted the Championship trophy after the final game against Doncaster.

His return to the Premier League brought him a series of goals, as he netted against Stoke City, Arsenal, Bolton Wanderers and Aston Villa to help the club achieve safety. The season ended with him being voted the club's Player of the Season Award winner.

On 14 May 2011, the penultimate Premier League game of the 2010–11 season, Craddock opened the scoring for Wolves in their league game against his old club Sunderland at the Stadium of Light. Wolves won the game 3–1, taking a big step towards Premier League survival. On 22 June 2011, it was confirmed that Craddock had agreed a new one-year deal to stay at Molineux. Craddock was out of selection for the start of the 2011–12 season but on 4 December against Sunderland, Craddock was recalled to the starting XI to replace out of form Roger Johnson. On 20 July 2012, it was confirmed that Craddock had agreed a new one-year deal to stay at Molineux. This contract included him being involved in the first-team, but also coaching younger players in the academy.

He announced his retirement on 17 May 2013 and was granted a testimonial by Wolves as reward for ten years of service.

== Personal life ==
In 2002 his four month old son Jake died in his sleep.

After his football career ended, Craddock developed as an artist producing portraiture, graffiti and photorealism. His first exhibition of his works, entitles "Le Bellezza Della Fusione", was held in November 2015, at the Antidote Art Gallery in Lutterworth, Leicestershire.

== Career statistics ==
Appearances and goals by club, season and competition
Club	Season	League			FA Cup		League Cup		Other (Note: Appearances and goals in the Football League play-offs, Football League Trophy)		Total	
Club	Season	Division	Apps	Goals	Apps	Goals	Apps	Goals	Apps	Goals	Apps	Goals
Cambridge United	1993–94	Division Two	20	0	0	0	0	0	0	0	20	0
Cambridge United	1994–95	Division Two	38	0	3	0	2	1	3	0	46	1
Cambridge United	1995–96	Division Three	46	3	1	0	1	0	1	0	49	3
Cambridge United	1996–97	Division Three	41	1	2	0	0	0	1	0	44	1
Cambridge United	Total		145	4	6	0	3	1	5	0	159	5
Sunderland	1997–98	Division One	32	0	2	0	3	0	3	0	32	0
Sunderland	1998–99	Division One	6	0	0	0	5	0	0	0	11	0
Sunderland	1999–2000	Premier League	19	0	1	0	0	0	0	0	20	0
Sunderland	2000–01	Premier League	34	0	1	0	1	0	0	0	36	0
Sunderland	2001–02	Premier League	30	1	1	0	0	0	0	0	31	1
Sunderland	2002–03	Premier League	25	1	4	0	1	0	0	0	30	1
Sunderland	Total		146	2	9	0	10	0	3	0	168	5
Sheffield United (loan)	1999–2000	Division One	10	0	0	0	0	0	0	0	10	0
Wolverhampton Wanderers	2003–04	Premier League	32	1	3	0	3	1	0	0	38	2
Wolverhampton Wanderers	2004–05	Championship	42	1	2	0	2	0	0	0	46	1
Wolverhampton Wanderers	2005–06	Championship	18	0	0	0	1	0	0	0	19	0
Wolverhampton Wanderers	2006–07	Championship	34	4	0	0	3	1	0	0	37	5
Wolverhampton Wanderers	2007–08	Championship	23	1	1	0	1	1	0	0	25	2
Wolverhampton Wanderers	2008–09	Championship	17	1	0	0	0	0	0	0	17	1
Wolverhampton Wanderers	2009–10	Premier League	33	5	2	0	1	0	0	0	36	5
Wolverhampton Wanderers	2010–11	Premier League	15	1	1	0	0	0	0	0	16	1
Wolverhampton Wanderers	2011–12	Premier League	1	0	0	0	2	0	0	0	3	0
Wolverhampton Wanderers	2012–13	Championship	0	0	0	0	0	0	0	0	0	0
Wolverhampton Wanderers	Total		215	14	9	0	13	3	0	0	237	17
Stoke City (loan)	2007–08	Championship	4	0	0	0	0	0	0	0	4	0
Career total			520	20	24	0	26	4	8	0	577	24

== Honours ==
Sunderland

- Football League First Division: 1998–99

Wolverhampton Wanderers

- Football League Championship: 2008–09

Individual

- PFA Team of the Year: 1996–97 Third Division
- Sunderland Player of the Year: 2001–02
- Wolverhampton Wanderers Player of the Year: 2009–10
