= Matt Jarvis =

English association football player (born 1986)

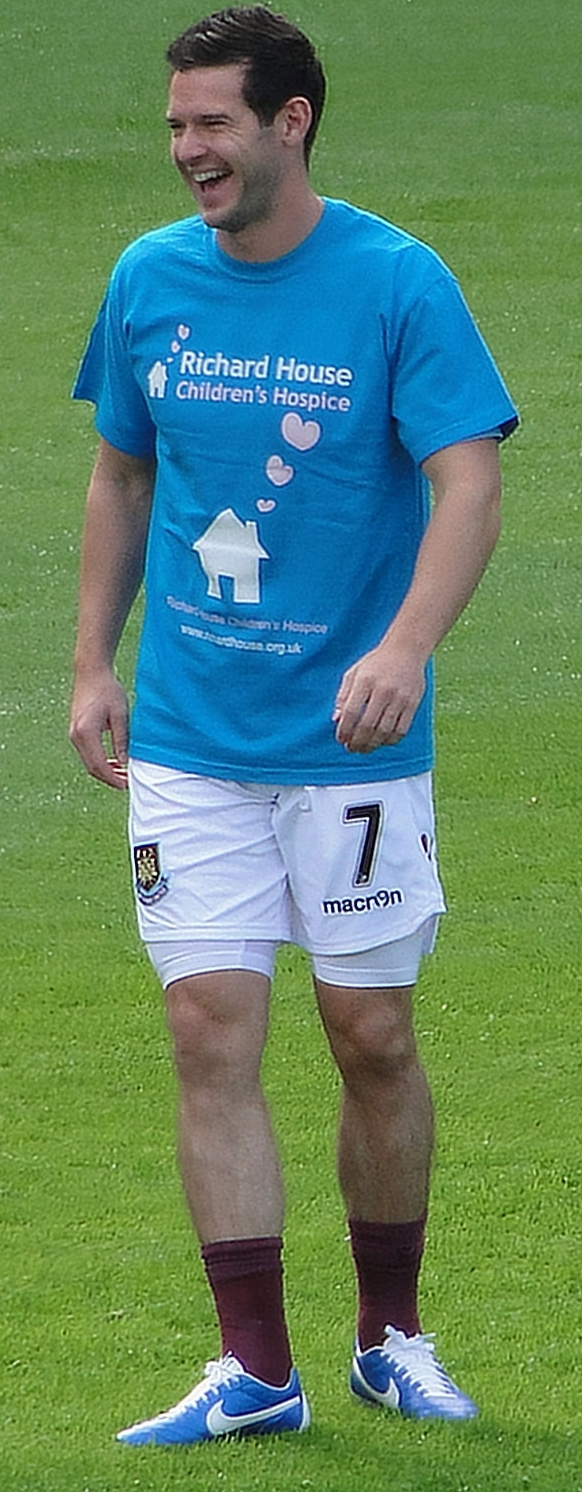
- Jarvis training with West Ham United in 2012

Personal information
- Full name: Matthew Thomas Jarvis
- Date of birth: 22 May 1986 (age 40)
- Place of birth: Middlesbrough, England
- Height: 5 ft 8 in (1.73 m)
- Position: Midfielder

Youth career
- Millwall
- –2003: Gillingham

Senior career*
Years	Team	Apps	(Gls)
2003–2007	Gillingham	110	(12)
2007–2012	Wolverhampton Wanderers	164	(19)
2012–2016	West Ham United	78	(4)
2015–2016	→ Norwich City (loan)	5	(1)
2016–2019	Norwich City	14	(0)
2019	→ Walsall (loan)	9	(0)
2020–2021	Woking	23	(2)
Total		403	(38)

International career
2011	England	1	(0)
- * Club domestic league appearances and goals

Matthew Thomas Jarvis (born 22 May 1986) is an English former professional footballer who played as a winger.

Jarvis began his professional career with Gillingham, making his Football League debut for the Kent-based club at the age of 17. He made more than 100 appearances for Gillingham and became a target for a number of larger clubs, eventually signing for Football League Championship club Wolverhampton Wanderers in 2007. He became a first-team regular for the club, helping them win promotion to the top flight in 2009. In 2012, he joined West Ham United for an undisclosed club record fee. In September 2015, he joined Norwich City on loan until the end of the season, and made that move permanent in January 2016. Jarvis spent three more years at the Canaries, including a brief loan spell with Walsall in 2019 before joining Woking and retiring in May 2021.

He received his first call-up to the England squad in 2011 and earned his only cap as a substitute against Ghana in a friendly at Wembley Stadium.

== Early life ==
Jarvis was born in Middlesbrough His parents, Nicky and Linda, both played table tennis professionally and each reached number one in the sport's British rankings. Later they set up the table tennis supplies company Jarvis Sports, which relocated from Guisborough to Guildford in the same year that Jarvis was born.

During his years at school in Surrey, Jarvis excelled at several sports, becoming a county champion in both swimming and athletics. He also gained ten GCSE qualifications.

== Club career ==
=== Gillingham ===
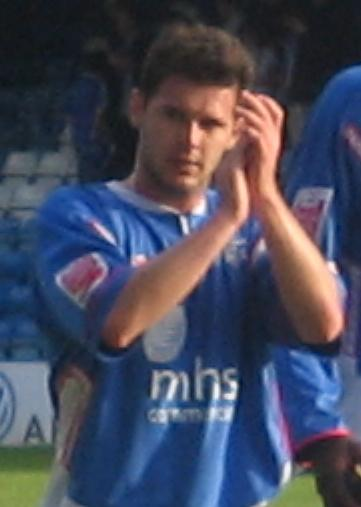
Jarvis playing for Gillingham in 2006

Like his older brother Ben, Jarvis started his career on the books of Millwall, but was released by the club. With the help of a member of the Millwall coaching staff, however, he was taken on by Kent-based club Gillingham as a trainee. On 4 November 2003, at the age of 17, he made his Football League debut in a match against Sunderland when a number of senior players were missing due to influenza. He came on as a 76th-minute substitute for Richard Rose in a match which his team lost 3–1. He next played for the first team in an FA Cup defeat to Burnley on 24 January 2004, and went on to feature regularly in the team in March and April. In total he made two starts and eight substitute appearances during the 2003–04 season, but also continued to play for the youth team, helping them reach the last sixteen of the FA Youth Cup. Shortly before the end of the season he signed his first professional contract with the club when manager Andy Hessenthaler gave him a three-year contract.

In the 2004–05 season Jarvis became a regular in the Gillingham first team, playing in 30 Football League matches, although he was out of action for five weeks in January and February after undergoing an operation on a hernia. He also scored his first goal for the club in a win over Wolverhampton Wanderers on 30 October 2004. Gillingham, however, were relegated from the Championship at the end of the season. In the 2005–06 season he was again a regular, and scored seven goals, his best season tally to date.

Midway through the 2006–07 season Gillingham offered Jarvis a new contract, which the club described as the most lucrative it had ever offered to a player of his age. Jarvis rejected the contract offer, but later claimed via his agent that he would be happy to remain at Priestfield Stadium if the club "demonstrated that it could match his ambitions". A number of Premier League and Championship clubs showed interest in signing Jarvis, and Plymouth Argyle made an unsuccessful bid for the player, manager Ian Holloway commenting that "we did make a bid but it got knocked back". Towards the end of the season Nottingham Forest of League One made an offer of £650,000, hoping to circumvent the transfer window by taking the player on loan until the end of the season, but the bid was turned down by the player's agent.

Jarvis ended the season having been named in the PFA's League One Team of the Year, Gillingham's Young Player of the Season, and with Charlton Athletic expressing their interest in him. However, Gillingham chairman Paul Scally stated that he believed the player's agent had already agreed a transfer with another club. Scally also claimed that Jarvis had the potential to play for England by the time he was 24.

=== Wolverhampton Wanderers ===
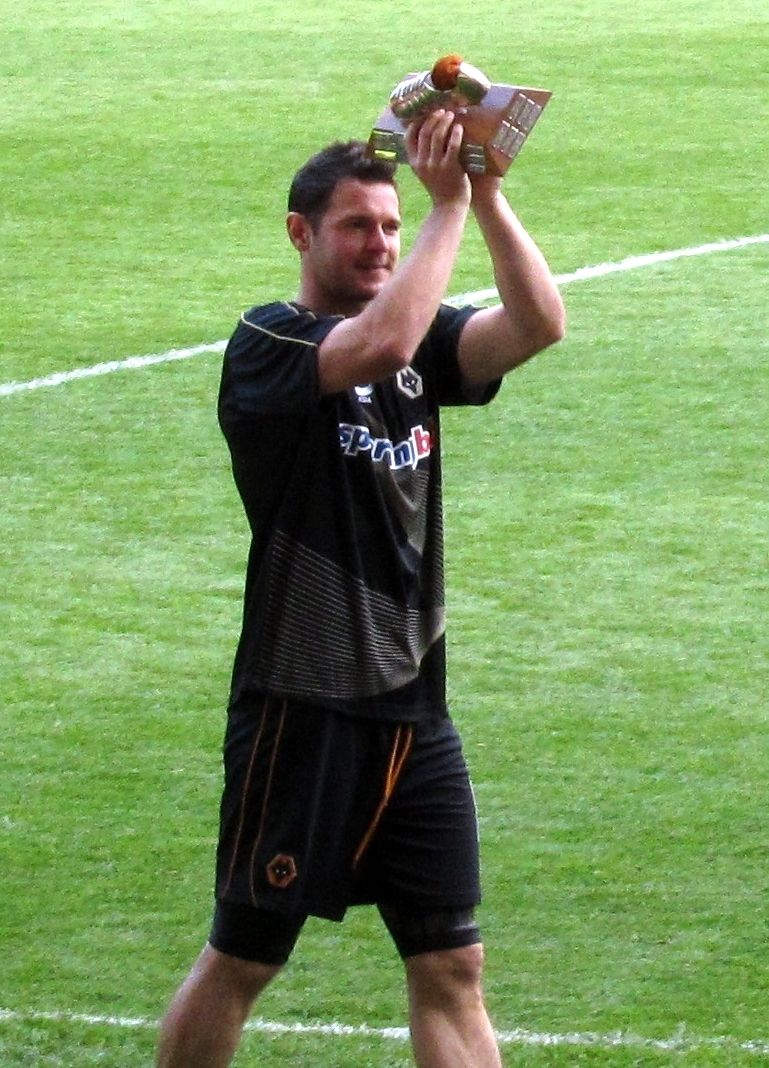
Jarvis after winning the Wolverhampton Wanderers Player of the Year award in 2011

Jarvis rejected a further improved contract offer by Gillingham, to join Wolverhampton Wanderers of the Championship in June 2007, signing a two-year contract with the option to extend his stay by a further year. The clubs agreed a transfer fee but the exact amount was not disclosed.

Jarvis suffered hip and groin injuries during pre-season training and was unable to take any further part in training until September. He finally made his debut for his new club on 20 October 2007, when he came on as an 88th-minute substitute in a 2–0 home victory over Charlton Athletic. After regaining full fitness, he became a first-choice player at Molineux, making a further 27 appearances during the 2007–08 season. He scored his first goal for the club in a 1–1 draw with Leicester City in December 2007, in a season where the club missed out on a play-off place by virtue of goal difference.

After a strong start to the following season for both club and player, Jarvis injured his hamstring in the defeat to Reading on 30 September 2008 and was expected to be out of action for approximately six weeks. He made his return in the 1–0 defeat to Queens Park Rangers on 6 December, and remained a first choice player as the club won promotion to the Premier League as champions.

He made his Premier League debut against West Ham United in August 2009 and played regularly during the 2009–10 season, scoring three times to help them achieve top flight survival. In September 2010, he signed a new contract which would have kept him at the club until the summer of 2015, and was once again a regular in the Wolves team during the 2010–11 season, scoring four Premier League goals, his highest tally for four seasons. On 19 May 2011, Jarvis was awarded both Supporters' Player of the Year award and Players' Player of the Year awards.

Jarvis submitted a transfer request on 11 August 2012, after media reports linked West Ham United with the player. Wolves rejected several bids for the player, without naming the club involved. On 23 August, Wolves accepted an offer from West Ham of a reported, initial £7.5 million, rising to £10.75 million.

=== West Ham United ===
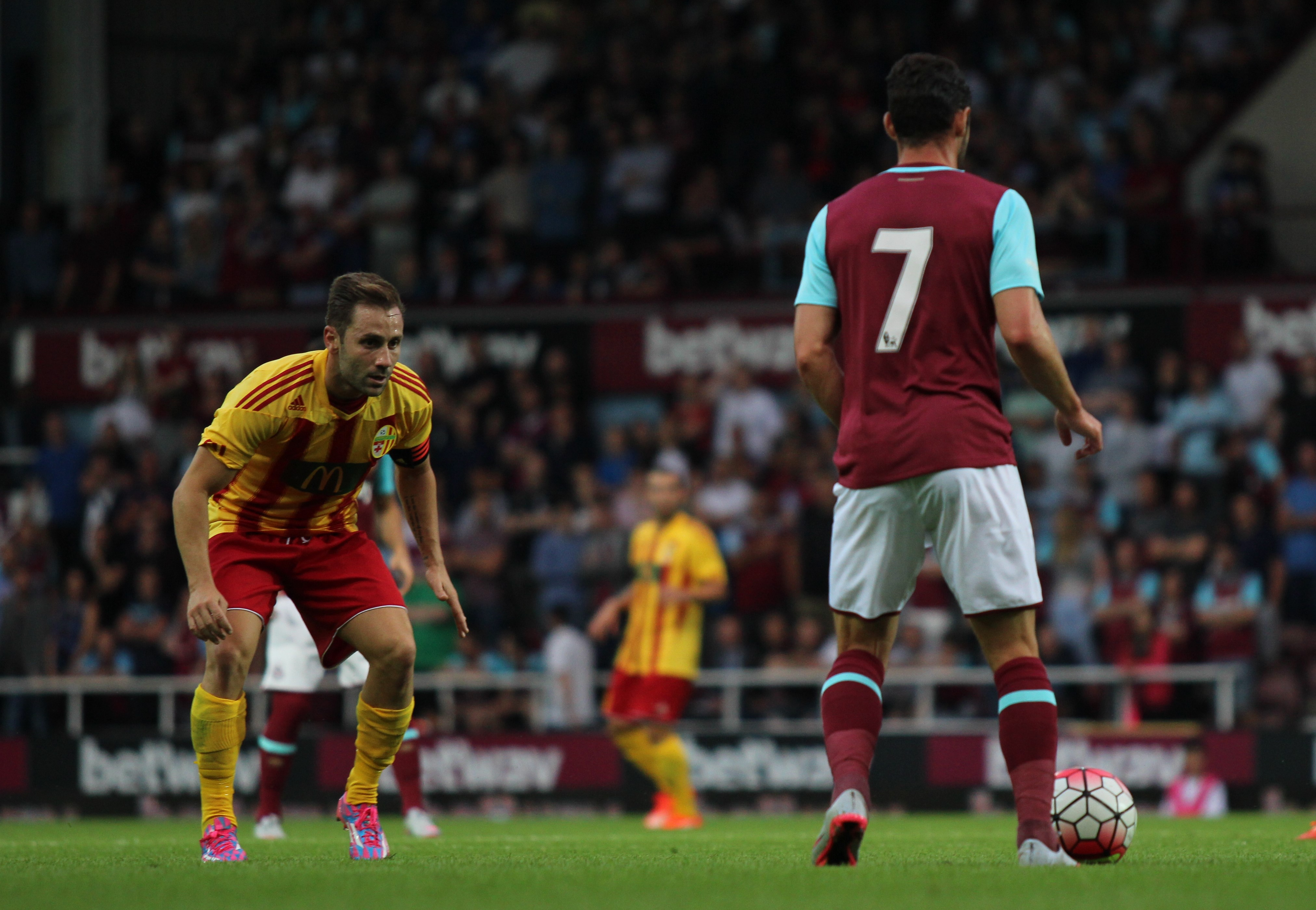
Jarvis (right) playing for West Ham United in 2015

On 24 August 2012, Jarvis signed a five-year contract, with the option for an additional year, for a transfer fee which was a club record but was officially undisclosed. Jarvis made his debut for West Ham on 25 August in a 3–0 away defeat to Swansea City. He scored his first goal for the club on 1 October, opening the scoring in a 2–1 win away to Queens Park Rangers at Loftus Road.

=== Norwich City ===
On 1 September 2015, Jarvis signed on a season-long loan for Norwich City. Eleven days later, he scored his first goal for the club against AFC Bournemouth in a 3–1 win. On 24 December 2015, Jarvis signed a permanent contract with Norwich, to take effect in the January transfer window, for a reported fee of £2.5 million. Jarvis started 12 games for the Canaries in the 2015–16 season, coming off the bench as a substitute another eight times. Nearing the end of the season Jarvis suffered a knee injury, which along with hamstring and hip injuries, would cause him to miss the entire 2016–17 season, with the exception of one appearance for the club's under-23 team in the EFL Trophy.

On 1 January 2019, Jarvis joined League One club Walsall on loan until the end of the 2018–19 season. He was released by Norwich at the end of the season.

=== Woking ===
Jarvis signed a deal with Woking on 28 February 2020. On 29 February he scored his first goal for the club on his debut, in a league game against Maidenhead United. On 7 July 2020, the club announced that Jarvis had extended his deal until the end of the 2020–21 season.

On 30 May 2021, Jarvis announced his retirement from football, ending his eighteen-year career.

== International career ==
Jarvis was called up to the England national team in March 2011 for matches against Wales (a Euro 2012 qualifier) and Ghana (an international friendly). He had been in provisional squads earlier in the season, but was now in the squad due to injuries to Theo Walcott and Adam Johnson. After not being selected for the matchday squad against Wales, he made his debut as a substitute against Ghana at Wembley Stadium on 29 March, coming on for Jack Wilshere in the 70th minute of a 1–1 draw. In doing so, he became the first Wolves player for England since Steve Bull in 1990.

== Personal life ==
Jarvis has been married to his wife Sarah since June 2011. In January 2013, he was interviewed for, and appeared on the cover of, gay lifestyle magazine Attitude to discuss homosexuality in football.

== Career statistics ==
=== Club ===
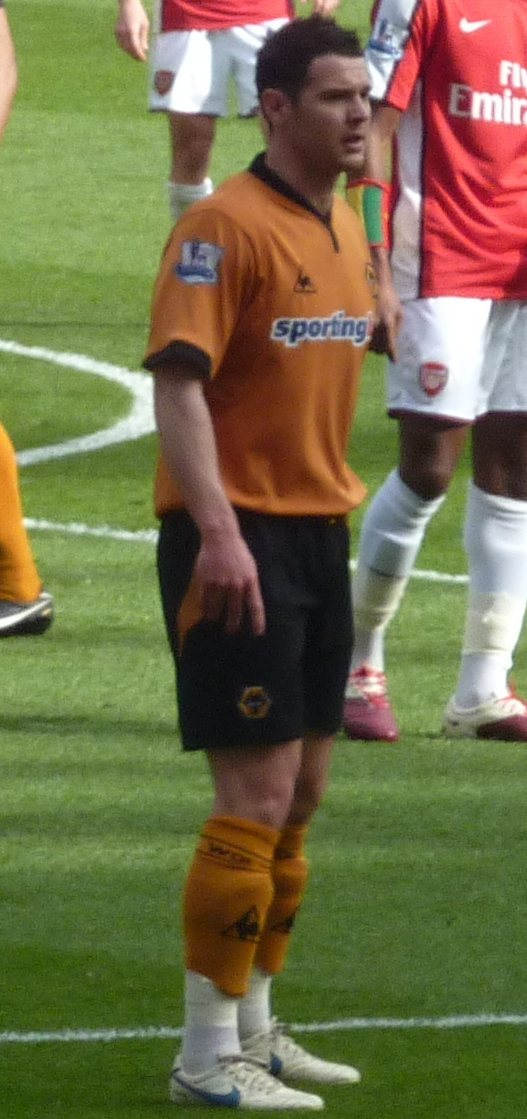
Jarvis playing for Wolverhampton Wanderers in 2010

Appearances and goals by club, season and competition
Club	Season	League			FA Cup		League Cup		Other		Total	
Club	Season	Division	Apps	Goals	Apps	Goals	Apps	Goals	Apps	Goals	Apps	Goals
Gillingham	2003–04	First Division	10	0	1	0	0	0	—		11	0
Gillingham	2004–05	Championship	30	3	0	0	1	0	—		31	3
Gillingham	2005–06	League One	35	3	1	1	3	1	2 (Note: Appearance(s) in Football League Trophy)	2	41	7
Gillingham	2006–07	League One	35	6	2	0	1	0	1	0	39	6
Gillingham	Total		110	12	4	1	5	1	3	2	122	16
Wolverhampton Wanderers	2007–08	Championship	26	1	2	0	0	0	—		28	1
Wolverhampton Wanderers	2008–09	Championship	28	3	1	0	0	0	—		29	3
Wolverhampton Wanderers	2009–10	Premier League	34	3	1	1	1	0	—		36	4
Wolverhampton Wanderers	2010–11	Premier League	37	4	3	1	1	0	—		41	5
Wolverhampton Wanderers	2011–12	Premier League	37	8	1	0	1	0	—		39	8
Wolverhampton Wanderers	2012–13	Championship	2	0	—		—		—		2	0
Wolverhampton Wanderers	Total		164	19	8	2	3	0	—		175	21
West Ham United	2012–13	Premier League	32	2	1	0	1	0	—		34	2
West Ham United	2013–14	Premier League	32	2	1	0	2	2	—		35	4
West Ham United	2014–15	Premier League	11	0	2	0	0	0	—		13	0
West Ham United	2015–16	Premier League	3	0	—		—		5 (Note: Appearances in UEFA Europa League)	0	8	0
West Ham United	Total		78	4	4	0	3	2	5	0	90	6
Norwich City	2015–16	Premier League	19	1	0	0	2	1	—		21	2
Norwich City	2016–17	Championship	0	0	0	0	0	0	—		0	0
Norwich City	2017–18	Championship	0	0	0	0	0	0	—		0	0
Norwich City	2018–19	Championship	0	0	0	0	0	0	—		0	0
Norwich City	Total		19	1	0	0	2	1	—		21	2
Norwich City U23	2016–17	—			—		—		1 (Note: Appearance in EFL Trophy)	0	1	0
Walsall (loan)	2018–19	League One	9	0	1	0	—		—		10	0
Woking	2019–20	National League	2	1	0	0	—		0	0	2	1
Woking	2020–21	National League	21	1	1	0	—		1 (Note: Appearance in FA Trophy)	0	23	1
Woking	Total		23	2	1	0	—		1	0	25	2
Career total			403	38	18	3	13	4	10	2	445	47

=== International ===
As of match played 29 March 2011

Appearances and goals by national team and year
National team	Year	Apps	Goals
England	2011	1	0
Total		1	0

== Honours ==
Wolverhampton Wanderers

- Football League Championship: 2008–09

Individual

- Gillingham Young Player of the Season: 2006–07
- Wolverhampton Wanderers Player of the Year: 2010–11
- Wolverhampton Wanderers Players' Player of the Year: 2010–11
- PFA Team of the Year: 2006–07 League One
