= Mark Salmon (footballer) =

Irish footballer

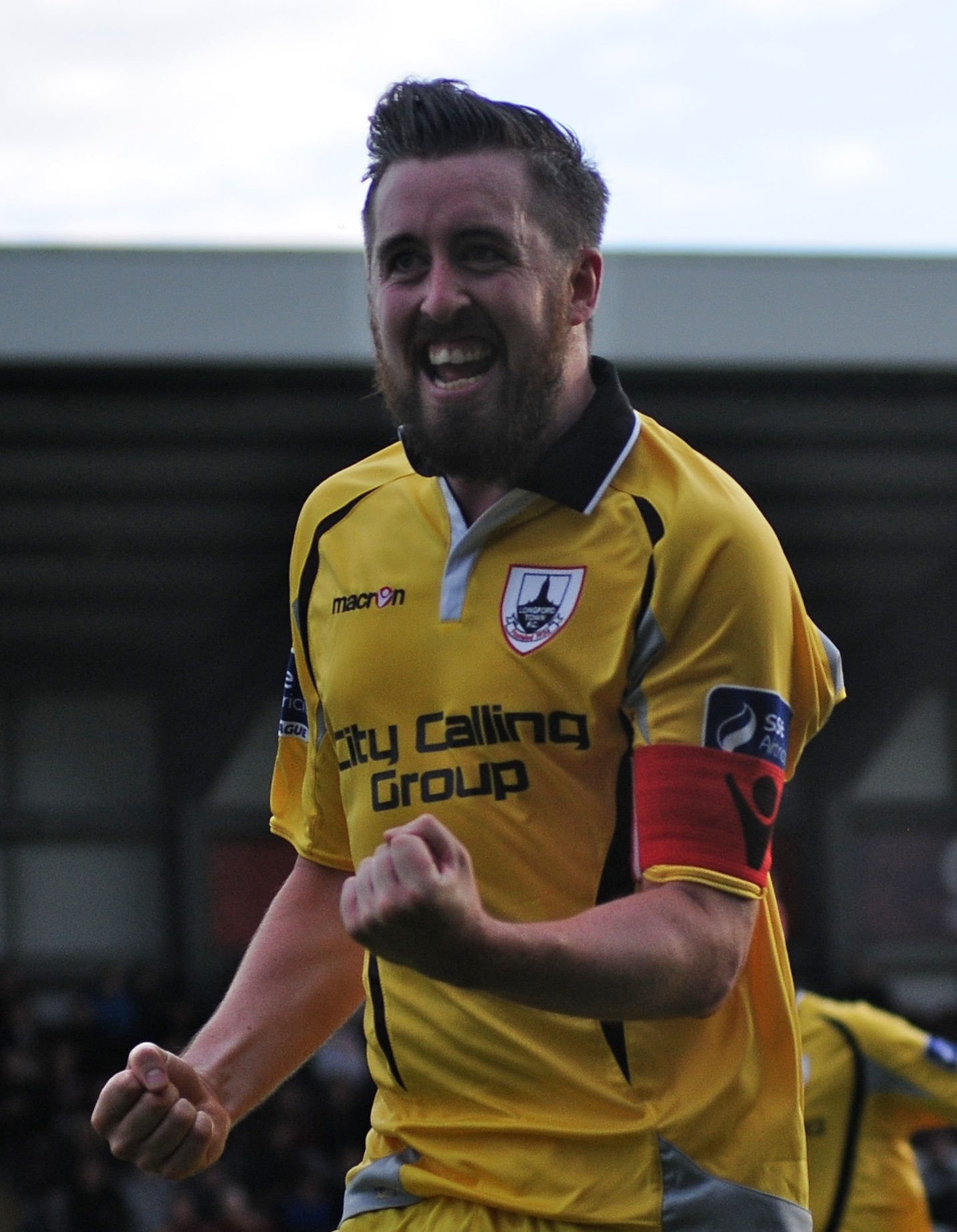
- Salmon with Longford Town in 2014

Personal information
- Full name: Mark Maurice Salmon
- Date of birth: 31 October 1988 (age 38)
- Place of birth: Dublin, Ireland
- Height: 5 ft 10 in (1.78 m)
- Position: Midfielder

Youth career
- Lourdes Celtic
- Wolverhampton Wanderers

Senior career*
Years	Team	Apps	(Gls)
2007–2009	Wolverhampton Wanderers	0	(0)
2007–2008	→ Port Vale (loan)	9	(0)
2009	Drogheda United	2	(0)
2009	Athlone Town		
2010–2015	Longford Town	136	(21)
2016–2018	Bray Wanderers	53	(4)
Total		200	(25)
- * Club domestic league appearances and goals

Mark Maurice Salmon (born 31 October 1988) is an Irish former professional footballer who played as a midfielder. He previously played for Wolverhampton Wanderers, Port Vale, Drogheda United, Athlone Town, Longford Town and Bray Wanderers. He helped Longford Town to finish as champions of the League of Ireland First Division in 2014.

== Career ==
Salmon is a product of the Wolverhampton Wanderers academy, but after signing his first professional contract in February 2007, failed to make a first-team appearance for the club. He joined League One Port Vale on loan in November 2007, and made his debut on 24 November as a substitute, replacing Marc Laird 87 minutes into a 3–1 defeat by Doncaster Rovers at Vale Park. His first senior start came ten days later at Elland Road, as Leeds United played out a comfortable 3–0 win. He played in Vale's infamous 1–0 defeat FA Cup to Chasetown, though remained in the first XI until returning to Molineux in January.

Wolves released him in early 2009, and he soon returned to his native Ireland to join League of Ireland side, Drogheda United. In the summer of 2009, he switched to Athlone Town of the First Division. He joined Longford Town in February 2010. He scored two goals in 32 league games in 2010. He scored eight goals in 28 appearances for the club in 2011. He scored three goals in 38 appearances in 2012, as Tony Cousins's Longford reached the play-off semi-finals following a third-place finish in the league. He scored two goals in 14 appearances in 2013, as Longford finished second and reached the play-off finals, where they were beaten by Bray Wanderers.

In his fifth year at the club, he finally got to enjoy success with "De Town" at the end of the 2014 season as the club won promotion as champions of the First Division. Salmon lifted the cup as club captain following the title being secured. Longford also reached the final of the Leinster Senior Cup, losing 2–1 to St Patrick's Athletic at Strokestown Road.

Salmon signed for Bray Wanderers on a two-year contract in November 2015 after being released by Longford. Harry Kenny's "Seagulls" finished sixth in 2016, with Salmon making 28 appearances and scoring four goals. Bray again finished sixth in the 2017 season, with Salmon scoring one goal from 29 matches.

== Career statistics ==
Appearances and goals by club, season and competition
Club	Season	League			National cup (Note: Includes FA Cup, FAI Cup)		Other		Total	
Club	Season	Division	Apps	Goals	Apps	Goals	Apps	Goals	Apps	Goals
Wolverhampton Wanderers	2006–07	Championship	0	0	0	0	0	0	0	0
Wolverhampton Wanderers	2007–08	Championship	0	0	0	0	0	0	0	0
Wolverhampton Wanderers	2008–09	Championship	0	0	0	0	0	0	0	0
Wolverhampton Wanderers	Total		0	0	0	0	0	0	0	0
Port Vale (loan)	2007–08	League One	9	0	1	0	—		10	0
Drogheda United	2009	LOI Premier Division	2	0	0	0	0	0	2	0
Longford Town	2010	LOI First Division	32	2	0	0	0	0	32	2
Longford Town	2011	LOI First Division	28	8	1	0	0	0	29	8
Longford Town	2012	LOI First Division	28	3	0	0	1	0	29	3
Longford Town	2013	LOI First Division	14	2	0	0	0	0	14	2
Longford Town	2014	LOI First Division	21	5	0	0	1	0	22	5
Longford Town	2015	LOI Premier Division	13	1	2	0	1	0	16	1
Longford Town	Total		136	21	3	0	3	0	142	21
Bray Wanderers	2016	LOI Premier Division	26	3	0	0	2	1	28	4
Bray Wanderers	2017	LOI Premier Division	27	1	0	0	2	0	29	1
Bray Wanderers	2018	LOI Premier Division	0	0	0	0	0	0	0	0
Bray Wanderers	Total		53	4	0	0	4	1	57	5
Career total			200	25	4	0	7	1	211	26

== Honours ==
Longford Town

- League of Ireland First Division: 2014
- Leinster Senior Cup runner-up: 2014
