= Michael Kightly =

English footballer

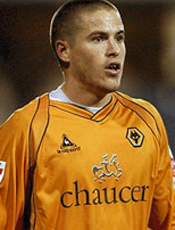
- Kightly playing for Wolverhampton Wanderers in 2007.

Personal information
- Full name: Michael John Kightly
- Date of birth: 24 January 1986 (age 40)
- Place of birth: Basildon, England
- Height: 5 ft 9 in (1.75 m)
- Position: Winger

Youth career
- 2000–2001: Tottenham Hotspur

Senior career*
Years	Team	Apps	(Gls)
2001–2002	Basildon United		
2002–2005	Southend United	13	(0)
2004–2005	→ Farnborough Town (loan)	11	(0)
2005–2007	Grays Athletic	53	(24)
2006–2007	→ Wolverhampton Wanderers (loan)	5	(2)
2007–2012	Wolverhampton Wanderers	109	(21)
2011–2012	→ Watford (loan)	12	(3)
2012–2014	Stoke City	22	(3)
2013–2014	→ Burnley (loan)	36	(5)
2014–2017	Burnley	40	(1)
2017	→ Burton Albion (loan)	12	(4)
2017–2019	Southend United	60	(7)
2020–2021	Rushall Olympic	6	(0)
Total		379	(70)

International career
2007–2008	England U21	7	(0)
- * Club domestic league appearances and goals

Michael John Kightly (born 24 January 1986) is an English former professional footballer who played as a winger, most notably for Wolverhampton Wanderers and Burnley FC.

Kightly was rejected as a schoolboy by Tottenham Hotspur but worked his way back to League football with Southend United. He again slipped into the non-League though, before being spotted by Wolverhampton Wanderers while starring for Grays Athletic. He soon became a vital player for Wolves and was pivotal in their promotion to the Premier League in 2009. However injuries disrupted his time in the top flight before the club's relegation after three seasons. He joined Stoke City in August 2012 for an undisclosed fee. Kightly spent the 2012–13 season at Stoke before joining Burnley on loan in August 2013. After helping the Clarets gain promotion to the Premier League he made the move permanent in June 2014.

== Club career ==
=== Southend United ===
Born in Basildon, Kightly played schoolboy football for Tottenham Hotspur but was released and subsequently picked up by his hometown team, non-League Basildon United. His stay was short and was soon back in professional football, signing a two-year scholarship with Southend United on 16 December 2002 following a five-game trial period. He made his league debut for the club on 3 May 2003, in a 1–0 defeat at Exeter City.

Although featuring in all their cup games of this time, scoring once in the Football League Trophy against Luton Town, he made only 13 league appearances over three different seasons for them. On 22 October 2004, he joined Farnborough Town on loan, spending three months with the club before returning to Southend United on 20 January 2005. He was released at the end of the season by Southend manager Steve Tilson.

=== Grays Athletic ===
Conference side Grays Athletic signed Kightly, where he scored 15 league goals in his first season, and won the FA Trophy. He began the 2006–07 season still with Grays, and had scored 10 goals by November. Such form caught the eye of scouts at Championship side Wolverhampton Wanderers, to whom he completed a two-month emergency loan move on 17 November 2006.

He would subsequently return to play against Grays for Wolves in a pre-season friendly, which was a condition of the permanent deal later made between the clubs.

=== Wolverhampton Wanderers ===
Kightly scored his first ever league goal to earn a 1–0 victory at Queens Park Rangers in December 2006. His form at Grays Athletic led him to be dubbed "The Ryan Giggs of non-league football", and it was reported that Sir Alex Ferguson was interested in signing Kightly for Manchester United. After scoring two goals in five games, his loan move was made permanent when he signed a two-and-a-half-year contract for a nominal fee on New Year's Day 2007.

He became a first-team regular in the remainder of the season, and his six goals helped the club into a play-off position. His performances saw him come runner-up for Wolves' Player of the Year 2006–07, losing out to goalkeeper Matt Murray. Kightly signed a new four-year deal with Wolves in June 2007, after reported interest from Manchester United, Aston Villa, and Everton.

His first full season with the club was severely hampered by a persistent ankle injury suffered in November 2007, from which he twice tried to return to first team football, eventually undergoing surgery in February 2008. Kightly had further injuries that kept him out of the Wolves side, finally returning to play in the final four fixtures as the club narrowly missed the play-off places on goal difference. He signed an improved new four-year deal with the club in June 2008.

During the 2008–09 season, he contributed eight goals, as Wolves led the promotion race. However, his campaign was prematurely halted by a broken metatarsal sustained during a reserve game in March 2009. He returned to make his first appearances in the Premier League, following promotion, by September but again suffered another injury after needing an ankle operation. Although planned to return early in the 2010–11 season, he suffered a further setback and was therefore omitted from the club's 25-man squad list for the first part of the campaign. He eventually made his return to first team action after 16 months on the sidelines from various injuries, against Newcastle United in April 2011.

In October 2011, he joined Championship side Watford in an initial one-month loan deal to regain match fitness, making his debut on 15 October 2011 in a 2–0 loss against Crystal Palace. This was later extended to run until January 2012, during which time Kightly made twelve appearances for the Hornets, scoring three times.

Following his loan spell, Kightly returned to Wolves and managed his longest period of Premier League football. However, he could not prevent the team from suffering relegation at the end of a troubled campaign that saw the departure of manager Mick McCarthy. Despite Wolves struggling Kightly hit a rich vein of form towards the end of the season scoring three goals against Aston Villa, Bolton Wanderers and Stoke City. In August 2012 it was revealed by Wolves that Kightly was in talks with Stoke City, having rejected a contract extension to instead remain in the top flight. After signing for Stoke Kightly revealed that after missing 15 months of football at Wolves it left him fighting against depression.

=== Stoke City ===
Kightly joined Premier League side Stoke City on 8 August 2012 for an undisclosed fee. He made an instant impact with Stoke scoring with his first touch in a 1–1 draw with German side SpVgg Greuther Fürth in a pre-season friendly. He then scored on his Premier League debut for Stoke in a 1–1 draw away at Reading. He scored his second goal for Stoke on 20 October 2012 in a 4–2 defeat at Manchester United. However, he fell out of favour with manager Tony Pulis and found himself in and out of the team. He scored against Aston Villa on 6 April 2013. Kightly ended the season with 26 appearances to his name of which 19 were starts, as Stoke finished in 13th position. In May 2013 Pulis was replaced by Mark Hughes and Kightly expressed his desire to become a first team regular under the new manager and also admitted he struggled with confidence in the 2012–13 season.

=== Burnley ===
On 2 September Kightly joined Burnley on loan for the 2013–14 season. He scored his first goal for Burnley in a 1–0 win over Barnsley on 7 December 2013. Kightly scored five goals in 38 games for Burnley as they gained promotion to the Premier League. He made his move to Turf Moor permanent on 27 June 2014, signing a three-year contract.

On 31 January 2017, Kightly joined Burton Albion on loan until the end of the 2016–17 season. He scored on his debut for the club in a 2-1 win over Wolverhampton Wanderers on 4 February 2017. He made a total of twelve appearances for the Brewers, scoring four goals as they secured their Championship status. He was released by Burnley at the end of the 2016–17 season.

=== Return to Southend ===
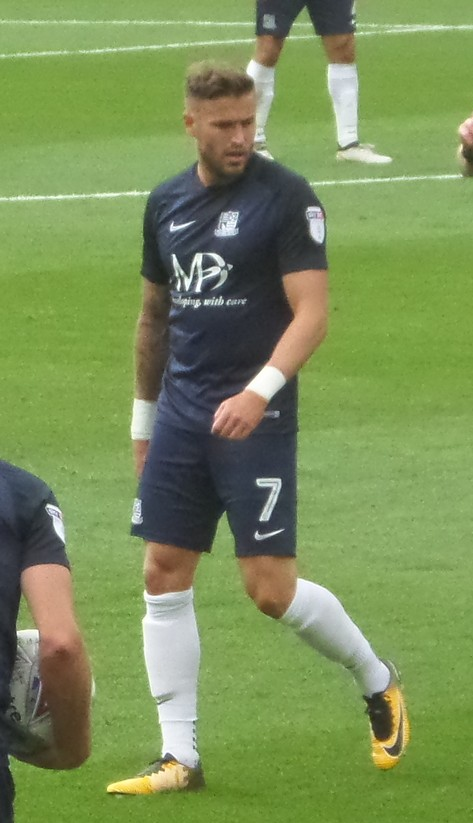
Kightly playing for Southend United in 2017.

In July 2017 Kightly rejoined Southend United on a three-year contract. Kightly announced his retirement from football on 12 August 2019.

=== Rushall Olympic ===
On 4 September 2020, Kightly came out of retirement and signed for Rushall Olympic.

== International career ==
Kightly was called into the England U21 squad in August 2007 for a friendly against Romania and went on to make his debut, playing the first half of the game.

== Personal life ==
Kightly has a daughter called Alexa and a son Leo. He grew up supporting Manchester United but switched allegiances to Tottenham Hotspur.

== Career statistics ==
As of 28 January 2021

Appearances and goals by club, season and competition
Club	Season	League			FA Cup		League Cup		Other		Total	
Club	Season	Division	Apps	Goals	Apps	Goals	Apps	Goals	Apps	Goals	Apps	Goals
Southend United	2002–03	Third Division	1	0	0	0	0	0	0	0	1	0
Southend United	2003–04	Third Division	11	0	3	0	0	0	3 (Note: Appearances in Football League Trophy)	1	17	1
Southend United	2004–05	League Two	1	0	0	0	0	0	0	0	1	0
Southend United	Total		13	0	3	0	0	0	3	1	19	1
Farnborough Town (loan)	2004–05	Conference National	11	0	—		—		1 (Note: Appearance(s) in FA Trophy)	0	12	0
Grays Athletic	2005–06	Conference National	35	14	3	1	—		10 (Note: 2 appearances and 1 goal in Conference National play-offs, 8 appearances and 2 goals in FA Trophy)	3	48	18
Grays Athletic	2006–07	Conference National	18	10	1	0	—		0	0	19	10
Grays Athletic	Total		53	24	4	1	—		10	3	67	28
Wolverhampton Wanderers (loan)	2006–07	Championship	5	2	—		—		—		5	2
Wolverhampton Wanderers	2006–07	Championship	19	6	—		—		2 (Note: Appearances in Championship play-offs)	0	21	6
Wolverhampton Wanderers	2007–08	Championship	21	4	2	1	2	0	—		25	5
Wolverhampton Wanderers	2008–09	Championship	38	8	2	0	1	0	—		41	8
Wolverhampton Wanderers	2009–10	Premier League	9	0	0	0	1	0	—		10	0
Wolverhampton Wanderers	2010–11	Premier League	4	0	0	0	0	0	—		4	0
Wolverhampton Wanderers	2011–12	Premier League	18	3	1	0	2	0	—		21	3
Wolverhampton Wanderers	Total		114	23	5	1	6	0	2	0	127	24
Watford (loan)	2011–12	Championship	12	3	—		—		—		12	3
Stoke City	2012–13	Premier League	22	3	3	0	1	0	—		26	3
Burnley (loan)	2013–14	Championship	36	5	0	0	2	0	—		38	5
Burnley	2014–15	Premier League	17	1	2	0	1	0	—		20	1
Burnley	2015–16	Championship	18	0	2	0	1	0	—		21	0
Burnley	2016–17	Premier League	5	0	3	0	1	0	—		9	0
Burnley	Total		76	6	7	0	5	0	—		88	6
Burton Albion (loan)	2016–17	Championship	12	4	—		—		—		12	4
Southend United	2017–18	League One	29	6	1	0	0	0	0	0	30	6
Southend United	2018–19	League One	31	1	3	1	1	0	4	0	39	2
Southend United	Total		60	7	4	1	1	0	4	0	69	8
Rushall Olympic	2020–21	Southern League Premier Division Central	6	0	1	0	—		1	0	8	0
Career total			379	70	27	3	13	0	21	4	440	77

== Honours ==
Grays Athletic

- FA Trophy: 2005–06

Wolverhampton Wanderers

- Football League Championship: 2008–09

Burnley

- Football League Championship: 2015–16; runner-up: 2013–14

Individual

- PFA Team of the Year: 2008–09 Championship
