= Wayne Hennessey =

Welsh footballer (born 1987)

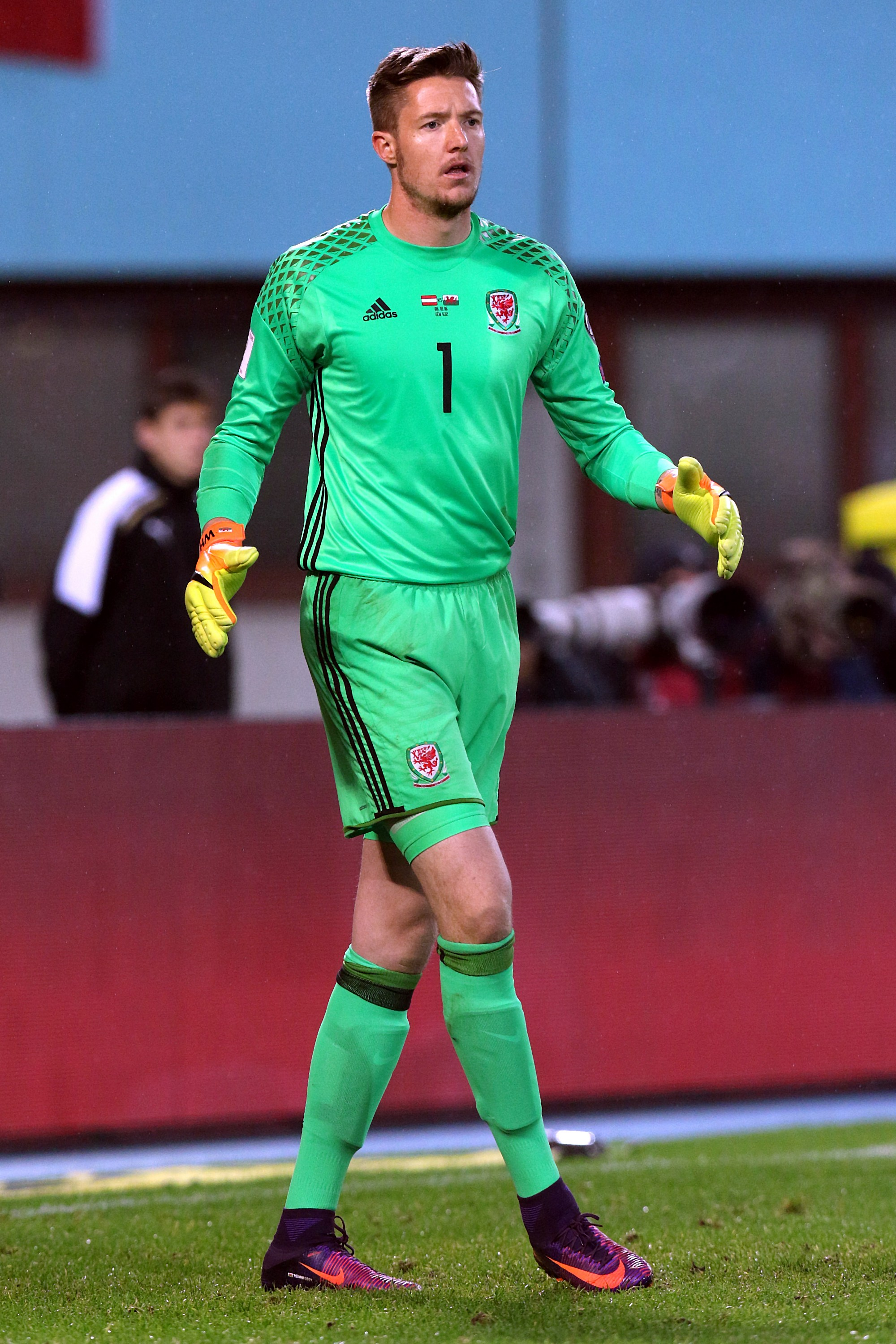
- Hennessey playing for Wales in 2016

Personal information
- Full name: Wayne Robert Hennessey
- Date of birth: 24 January 1987 (age 39)
- Place of birth: Bangor, Wales
- Height: 6 ft 6 in (1.98 m)
- Position: Goalkeeper

Youth career
- –2003: Manchester City
- 2003–2006: Wolverhampton Wanderers

Senior career*
Years	Team	Apps	(Gls)
2006–2014	Wolverhampton Wanderers	152	(0)
2006	→ Bristol City (loan)	0	(0)
2007	→ Stockport County (loan)	15	(0)
2013	→ Yeovil Town (loan)	12	(0)
2014–2021	Crystal Palace	110	(0)
2021–2022	Burnley	2	(0)
2022–2024	Nottingham Forest	4	(0)
2025	Nottingham Forest	0	(0)
Total		295	(0)

International career
2003	Wales U17	5	(0)
2004	Wales U19	7	(0)
2005–2009	Wales U21	6	(0)
2007–2023	Wales	109	(0)
Medal record
Men's football
Representing Wales
UEFA European Championship
Bronze medal – third place	2016 France
- * Club domestic league appearances and goals

Wayne Robert Hennessey (born 24 January 1987) is a Welsh former professional footballer who played as a goalkeeper.

Hennessey's first professional games saw him set a new Football League record for consecutive clean sheets while on loan at Stockport County. He played 166 times for Wolverhampton Wanderers over eight seasons, including three years at Premier League level. After several injury setbacks, he moved to Crystal Palace in 2014. He played 132 total games in eight seasons at Palace, including their defeat in the 2016 FA Cup final, and then played for Burnley and Nottingham Forest.

A full international from 2007 to 2023, Hennessey is Wales' joint-second most-capped player and its most capped goalkeeper, with 109 appearances. He was in the Wales squads for the UEFA European Championship in 2016 and 2020, reaching the semi-finals of the former, and was also chosen for the 2022 FIFA World Cup.

== Early life and career ==
Hennessey is a cousin of Terry Hennessey, who earned 39 caps for Wales from 1962 to 1972. Born in Bangor, Gwynedd, and raised in Beaumaris, Anglesey, Hennessey is a fluent Welsh language speaker. and was educated at Ysgol David Hughes but switched to Connah's Quay High School as it was easier to travel to Manchester. Hennessey began as a trainee at Manchester City but was released in 2003, whereupon he joined the youth academy at Wolverhampton Wanderers. After progressing through the ranks, he signed his first professional contract in April 2005.

After remaining in Wolves' reserve and youth teams during the 2005–06 season, Hennessey was sent on trial with Bristol City in July 2006 with a view to a loan move to gain first team experience but was recalled to Wolves after an injury to their first-choice goalkeeper Matt Murray. He did go back to Bristol City in August 2006, however, on a one-month loan deal, but he did not make an appearance and returned to his parent club early due to an arm injury.

== Club career ==
=== Stockport County ===
To gain first-team football, Hennessey joined League Two side Stockport County in January 2007 on a one-month loan. On his senior debut against Boston United, he kept a clean sheet and after keeping another five clean sheets in successive matches, his loan spell was extended by an extra month.

He went on to set a Football League record of nine successive clean sheets and wins. Stockport broke the 119-year-old record, when they beat Swindon Town 3–0 on 3 March 2007. After this accomplishment, he was named the League Two Player of the Month for February 2007. His feat also means he now holds County's record for the longest period without conceding a goal, beating Harry Hardy's 85-year-old record. His record now stands at 857 minutes, from the start of his competitive club debut, against Boston United on 13 January 2007, until Oliver Allen of Barnet scored on 10 March 2007. He therefore did not concede in his first nine-and-a-half matches of competitive club football.

=== Wolverhampton Wanderers ===
Hennessey was recalled by Wolves in April 2007 after another injury to first-choice Matt Murray, and found himself on the substitutes bench for several games. When Murray broke his shoulder on the eve of Wolves' Championship play-off semi-final first leg against local rivals West Bromwich Albion, Hennessey stepped in to make his Wolves debut.

With Murray sidelined for the whole of the 2007–08 season with yet another injury, Hennessey became firmly established at the club's number one, being an ever-present in the league and signing a new extended contract. At the end of the season he was named in the 2007–08 PFA Championship Team of the Year as well as being named Wolves' Player of the Season. FourFourTwo magazine ranked him 22nd in their Top 50 Football League Players list.

The 2008–09 season saw a strong start for Hennessey and Wolves with eight victories out of the first nine league games. This fine run ended against promotion rivals Reading with a 0–3 loss begun by an own goal from Hennessey. Soon after manager Mick McCarthy dropped him to the bench, citing mental fatigue as the reason. Reserve keeper Carl Ikeme deputised and impressed enough to leave Hennessey on the sidelines until an injury ruled him out for the majority of the season. Hennessey then regained and kept his place in goal for the remainder of the season which culminated with promotion to the Premier League as champions after a five-year absence.

Hennessey began the club's 2009–10 Premier League campaign as first choice goalkeeper, making his 100th senior appearance for the club in a 2–2 draw at Stoke City in October 2009. However, after conceding four goals in two successive games, he was replaced by the more experienced Marcus Hahnemann and remained on the bench for the rest of the season as the club finished 15th.

In July 2010, Hennessey extended his contract with Wolves to run until the summer of 2015. The following season began with Hahnemann retaining the number one spot until his own loss of form saw Hennessey return to the starting line-up in November 2010. He then held on to the spot for the remainder of the campaign as the club narrowly avoided relegation on the final day.

During the 2011–12 season, Hennessey was part of the Wolves defence that went a club record of 30 consecutive league games without a clean sheet. They finally ended this with a goalless draw at Sunderland in April 2012, but by then the team was rooted to the bottom of the table. Despite the game halting this run, it brought bad news for Hennessey as he suffered a torn cruciate knee ligament during it that was due to keep him sidelined until Autumn 2012. After completing several reserve games during his comeback he re-injured the knee during training in November 2012 which kept him out of action for the remainder of the 2012–13 season.

He made his return to the Wolves goal during pre-season ahead of their 2013–14 campaign – with the club now in League One having suffered two relegations since Hennessey's initial injury – but he was not selected to start the club's opening fixtures. On 12 August 2013 it was agreed for the goalkeeper to spend a month on loan at Yeovil Town as he recovers from his long-term injury problems. However, before this deal was officially concluded Hennessey suffered a hamstring problem while on international duty with the Welsh national team and so the proposed loan was scrapped. Although, on 21 August 2013, after an injury to Yeovil's replacement goalkeeper Sam Johnstone Hennessey officially joined Yeovil Town on an initial one-month loan which was eventually extended until 17 November 2013. He made his Yeovil debut in a 0–3 loss to Derby County on 24 August 2013. In his penultimate home match Hennessey received the man of the match award after the Glovers achieved their first ever home win at Championship by defeating Nottingham Forest.

After his loan spell at Yeovil ended, Hennessey returned to Wolves but did not displace Carl Ikeme in goal. When Ikeme suffered an injury in January 2014, Hennessey declined to play in the following fixture against Gillingham, launching speculation that he wanted a move away from the club. Although he subsequently apologised for his refusal to play, he did not play again for Wolves and negotiations were later entered into with Premier League team Crystal Palace.

=== Crystal Palace ===
On 31 January 2014 Hennessey joined Crystal Palace on a three-and-a-half-year deal for an undisclosed fee, with media speculation suggesting it to be an initial £1.6 million, with add-on clauses. Hennessey made his debut for the Eagles in the team's final match of the Premier League season, a 2–2 draw with Fulham on 11 May 2014.

Hennessey's first appearance of the 2014–15 season came with a 3–0 win at Walsall in the Football League Cup second round. On 25 October he made his first appearance of the season Premier League as a substitute for injured first-choice goalkeeper Julián Speroni in a 2–2 draw at West Bromwich Albion. He ended the season starting in Palace's final two league fixtures, wins against Liverpool and Swansea City, keeping his first Premier League clean sheet for the club in the latter match.

After starting in Palace's 2015–16 Football League Cup second and third round matches, Hennessey was selected to start the Premier League fixture against Watford in place of Alex McCarthy. He kept a clean sheet as Palace won 1–0 at Vicarage Road and retained his place as the team's first-choice goalkeeper, making five consecutive league appearances. He played in the 2016 FA Cup Final, lost 2–1 to Manchester United after extra time.

Hennessey signed a three-year contract in July 2018. However, in the ensuing season, he competed with new signing Vicente Guaita to be the starting goalkeeper. The Spaniard was first choice in the following season.

Hennessey was sidelined from October 2020 until the following February, with a thigh injury from an international match. He left Crystal Palace in July 2021 upon being released.

=== Burnley ===
On 20 July 2021, Hennessey joined Burnley on a free transfer following his release from Crystal Palace, signing a two-year deal. He made his debut on 25 August in the second round of the EFL Cup away to Newcastle United, keeping a clean sheet in a goalless draw and then saving from Allan Saint-Maximin and Miguel Almirón in a 4–3 penalty shootout win. In the league, he was back-up to Nick Pope and played only in two 3–1 losses at Manchester United and Leeds United at the turn of the year while the Englishman had COVID-19; the Clarets suffered relegation.

=== Nottingham Forest ===
On 15 July 2022, Hennessey returned to the Premier League following Burnley's relegation to join newly promoted Nottingham Forest on a two-year contract. He made his debut on 23 August in the second round of the EFL Cup, a 3–0 win at Grimsby Town. His league debut came on 27 December, as on-loan first-choice goalkeeper Dean Henderson was not permitted to play at his parent club Manchester United; Forest lost 3–0. In January 2023, Forest signed Keylor Navas on loan from Paris Saint-Germain, further demoting Hennessey. On 5 June 2024, Forest announced he would be leaving in the summer when his contract expired. After staying to train with the club following his release, Hennessey re-signed with Forest on 13 January 2025 on a deal until the end of the season.

=== Retirement ===
Hennessey announced his retirement from professional football on 16 July 2025. Upon retirement, he was appointed to a role in the Nottingham Forest goalkeeping coach team.

== International career ==
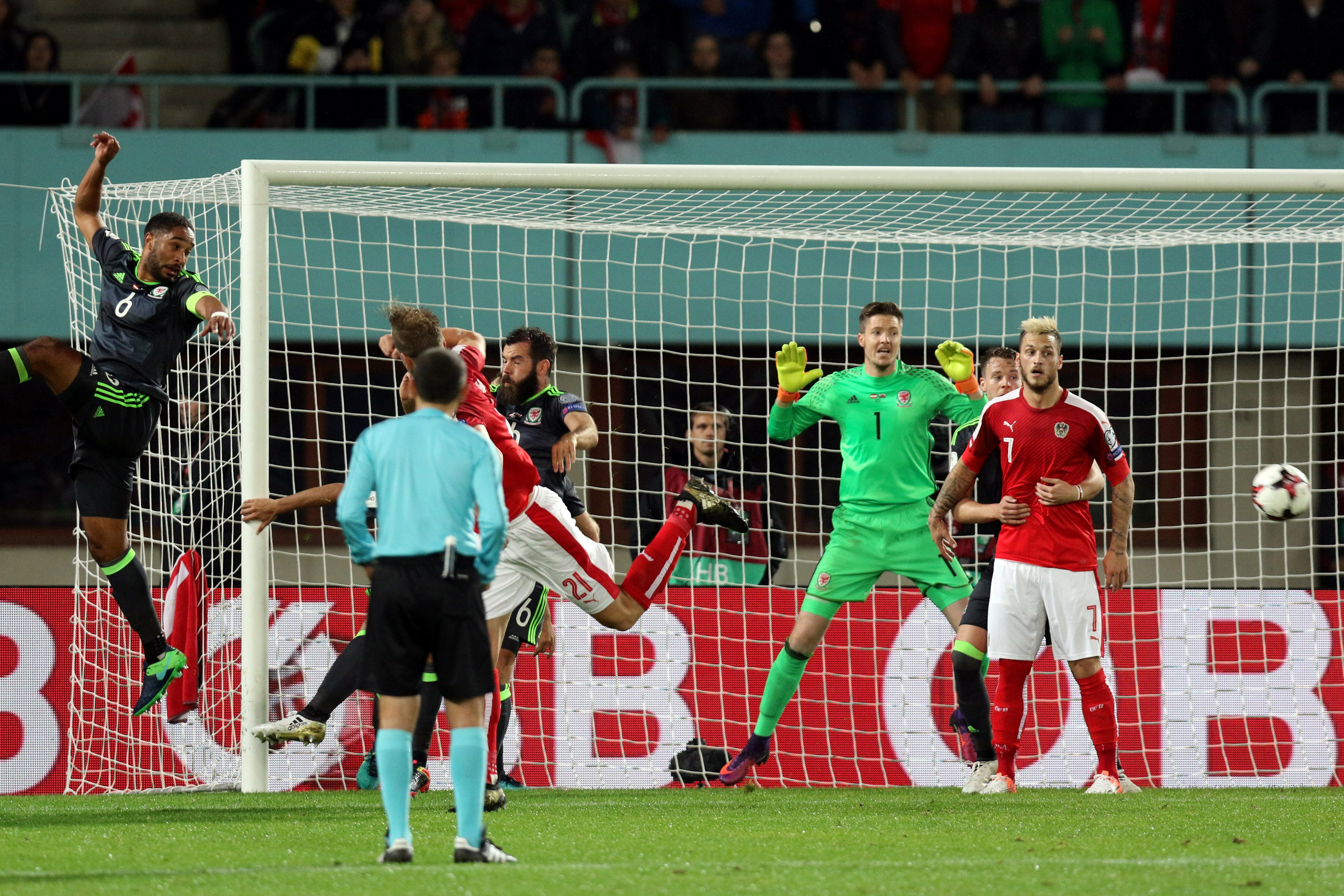
Hennessey (in light green) in goal for Wales against Austria in October 2016

Hennessey was capped for Wales at under-17, under-19 and under-21 level. He once scored for the under-19 side with a 40-yard free kick against Turkey.

He made his full international debut for Wales in a 2–2 friendly draw against New Zealand on 26 May 2007 and has since established himself as his country's first-choice goalkeeper. Hennessey made his 50th appearance for Wales on 3 September 2015, keeping a clean sheet in a 1–0 away win over Cyprus in UEFA Euro 2016 qualifying.

Hennessey played in all ten of Wales' qualifying matches for UEFA Euro 2016, conceding just four times, as they reached their first major international tournament since the 1958 FIFA World Cup. He was named in Wales' 23-man squad for the tournament as first choice goalkeeper but was forced to miss the opening game of the tournament, a 2–1 victory over Slovakia, after suffering a back spasm prior to the match, being replaced by Danny Ward. Hennessey started the remaining matches as Wales progressed to the semi-finals of the tournament before losing to Portugal.

On 3 September 2020, Hennessey reached his 35th clean sheet with Wales in a 1–0 UEFA Nations League win over Finland, to break the previous record held by Neville Southall. He was selected for the delayed UEFA Euro 2020 in May 2021, but was now second-choice to Ward, who had taken his place while he was injured. Hennessey earned his 100th Wales cap on 29 March 2022 in a 1–1 friendly match draw against the Czech Republic at the Cardiff City Stadium.

On 5 June 2022, Hennessey made nine saves, the most in the 2022 European World Cup qualification without conceding, to secure a 1–0 win for Wales against Ukraine in the play-off final, and a place in the 2022 FIFA World Cup, Wales' first such tournament since 1958. He was chosen for the final squad in Qatar.

Before the 2022 World Cup began, Hennessey said that the place as Wales' starting goalkeeper was contested, as he had played more international games but was rarely used by Nottingham Forest, while Ward was playing regularly and performing well for Leicester City. During the second group game against Iran, Hennessey was sent off with four minutes left to play when he kicked Mehdi Taremi's head while the game was goalless in an eventual 2–0 loss; he became the third goalkeeper in FIFA World Cup history to be sent off, following Gianluca Pagliuca in 1994 and Itumeleng Khune in 2010. Hennessey would become the only player to receive a straight red card in the 2022 World Cup; the other players who were dismissed in the tournament received two yellow cards in one match.

Hennessey’s final appearance for his country came in a friendly against Gibraltar on 10 November 2023. He featured for the second half of a 4–0 win at the Racecourse Ground in Wrexham, having replaced Ward.

== Nazi salute controversy ==
In January 2019, an investigation was launched by The FA after Hennessey was pictured making what appeared to be a Nazi salute in a group photo posted on Instagram by teammate Max Meyer. Hennessey denied making the salute, claiming that "any kind of resemblance to that kind of gesture is absolutely coincidental", despite appearing to have his left hand between his mouth and nose, mimicking a moustache, and right hand extended out in front of him. He provided photographs of him making similar gestures during matches to attract the attention of team-mates, although these photographs did not depict him mimicking a moustache with his other hand. In April 2019, the FA said there would be no further action after the charge was "not proven". Hennessey argued that he did not know what a Nazi salute was and the FA panel noted that "when cross-examined about this Mr Hennessey displayed a very considerable—one might even say lamentable—degree of ignorance about anything to do with Hitler, Fascism and the Nazi regime".

== Career statistics ==
=== Club ===
Appearances and goals by club, season and competition
Club	Season	League			FA Cup		League Cup		Other		Total	
Club	Season	Division	Apps	Goals	Apps	Goals	Apps	Goals	Apps	Goals	Apps	Goals
Wolverhampton Wanderers	2006–07	Championship	0	0	0	0	0	0	2 (Note: Appearances in Championship play-offs)	0	2	0
Wolverhampton Wanderers	2007–08	Championship	46	0	3	0	0	0	—		49	0
Wolverhampton Wanderers	2008–09	Championship	35	0	2	0	1	0	—		38	0
Wolverhampton Wanderers	2009–10	Premier League	13	0	3	0	0	0	—		16	0
Wolverhampton Wanderers	2010–11	Premier League	24	0	0	0	3	0	—		27	0
Wolverhampton Wanderers	2011–12	Premier League	34	0	0	0	0	0	—		34	0
Wolverhampton Wanderers	2012–13	Championship	0	0	0	0	0	0	—		0	0
Wolverhampton Wanderers	2013–14	League One	0	0	0	0	0	0	0	0	0	0
Wolverhampton Wanderers	Total		152	0	8	0	4	0	2	0	166	0
Bristol City (loan)	2006–07	League One	0	0	0	0	0	0	0	0	0	0
Stockport County (loan)	2006–07	League Two	15	0	0	0	0	0	0	0	15	0
Yeovil Town (loan)	2013–14	Championship	12	0	0	0	1	0	—		13	0
Crystal Palace	2013–14	Premier League	1	0	0	0	0	0	—		1	0
Crystal Palace	2014–15	Premier League	3	0	2	0	2	0	—		7	0
Crystal Palace	2015–16	Premier League	29	0	6	0	3	0	—		38	0
Crystal Palace	2016–17	Premier League	29	0	1	0	1	0	—		31	0
Crystal Palace	2017–18	Premier League	27	0	1	0	1	0	—		29	0
Crystal Palace	2018–19	Premier League	18	0	2	0	0	0	—		20	0
Crystal Palace	2019–20	Premier League	3	0	1	0	1	0	—		5	0
Crystal Palace	2020–21	Premier League	0	0	0	0	1	0	—		1	0
Crystal Palace	Total		110	0	13	0	9	0	—		132	0
Burnley	2021–22	Premier League	2	0	0	0	1	0	—		3	0
Nottingham Forest	2022–23	Premier League	4	0	1	0	4	0	—		9	0
Nottingham Forest	2023–24	Premier League	0	0	0	0	0	0	—		0	0
Nottingham Forest	2024–25	Premier League	0	0	0	0	—		—		0	0
Nottingham Forest	Total		4	0	1	0	4	0	—		9	0
Career total			295	0	22	0	19	0	2	0	338	0

=== International ===
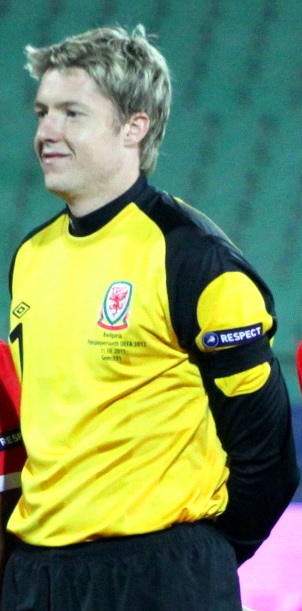
Hennessey with Wales in 2011

Appearances and goals by national team and year
National team	Year	Apps	Goals
Wales	2007	7	0
Wales	2008	7	0
Wales	2009	9	0
Wales	2010	6	0
Wales	2011	9	0
Wales	2012	0	0
Wales	2013	3	0
Wales	2014	6	0
Wales	2015	7	0
Wales	2016	12	0
Wales	2017	6	0
Wales	2018	7	0
Wales	2019	10	0
Wales	2020	5	0
Wales	2021	4	0
Wales	2022	10	0
Wales	2023	1	0
Total		109	0

== Honours ==
Wolverhampton Wanderers

- Football League Championship: 2008–09

Crystal Palace

- FA Cup runner-up: 2015–16

Individual

- PFA Team of the Year: 2007–08 Championship
- Football League Two Player of the Month: February 2007
- Wolverhampton Wanderers Player of the Year: 2007–08

== See also ==
- List of men's footballers with 100 or more international caps
