= Liam Hughes (footballer, born 1988) =

English footballer

Personal information
- Full name: Liam John Hughes
- Date of birth: 11 September 1988 (age 38)
- Place of birth: Gornal, Dudley, England
- Position: Forward

Youth career
- Wolverhampton Wanderers

Senior career*
| Years | Team | Apps | (Gls) |
| 2007–2009 | Wolverhampton Wanderers | 0 | (0) |
| 2007 | → Bury (loan) | 4 | (0) |
| 2008 | → Stafford Rangers (loan) | 3 | (0) |
- * Club domestic league appearances and goals

Liam John Hughes (born 11 September 1988) is an English former professional football who played as a forward. His career came to an end after being convicted of armed robbery in 2010.

== Career ==
Hughes was a product of the Wolverhampton Wanderers academy, but failed to make a first team appearance after signing professional forms in 2007. He had a two-month loan spell at League Two side Bury in November 2007, making his Football League début on 24 November 2007 as a substitute in a 2–1 defeat at Morecambe. To date, Hughes has only made three further appearances at league level.

After failing to convince his parent club, he was released in early 2009. In July 2009, Hughes featured as a trialist for Hereford United in their pre-season friendly against local rivals Pegasus Juniors, but was not offered a contract. Instead he continued his playing career with non-league Pensnett United, while also entering full-time work.

In June 2010 he was jailed for up for 32 months for his part in an armed robbery in his hometown of Gornal on 13 February 2010.
