= 2026–27 Hemel Hempstead Town F.C. season =

English football club season

Hemel Hempstead Town
2026–27 season
- Owner: David Boggins
- Manager: Lee Bircham
- Stadium: the Focus Community Arena
- Top goalscorer: Remaye Campbell (3)
- Highest home attendance: 849 (v. Chelmsford City, National league south, August 8, 2026)

The 2026–27 season is the 141th season in the history of Hemel Hempstead Town Football Club the club would also participate in the FA Cup, and the FA trophy

== Squad ==
As of 29 August 2026

No.	Name	Nationality	Position(s)	Since	Date of birth (age)	Signed from
Goalkeepers
1	Michael Johnson	(England)	GK	2025	28 October 1993 (age 32)	(England) St Albans City
13	James Taylor	(England)	GK	2026	11 July 2006 (age 20)	(England) Newcastle United
25	Thomas Morrell	(England)	GK	2026	14 April 2007 (age 19)	(England) Hemel Hempstead town academy
Defenders
2	David Agbontohoma	(England)	RB	2026	30 September 2001 (age 25)	(England) Maidstone United FC
5	Charlie Rowan	(England)	CB	2025	14 December 1997 (age 28)	(England) Weymouth FC
6	David Longe-King	(England)	CB	2026	26 January 1995 (age 31)	(England) Hampton & Richmond Borough FC
16	Josh Steele	(England)	CB	2026	13 August 2001 (age 25)	(England) Biggleswade Town FC
17	Stefan Parkes	(England)	LB	2026	28 March 2004 (age 22)	(England) Walton & Hersham FC
	Isaac Pitblado	(Scotland)	LB	2026	3 January 2002 (age 24)	(England) Eastbourne Borough FC
	Darion Dowrich	(England)	LB	2026	8 January 2003 (age 23)	(England) Cray Wanderers FC
22	Devante Stanley	(England)	RB	2025	1 September 1996 (age 30)	(England) Havant & Waterlooville FC
Midfielders
	Cameron Forde-Brown	(England)	CM	2026	7 March 2003 (age 23)	(England) King's Lynn Town FC
4	T'Sharne Gallimore	(British Virgin Islands)	CM	2026	20 August 2000 (age 26)	(England) Bedford Town FC
8	Josh Green	(England)	CM	2026	17 March 2004 (age 22)	(England) Basingstoke Town FC
12	Kyran Wiltshire	(England)	CM	2024	15 September 1996 (age 30)	(England) St Albans City F.C.
15	Billy Mardell-Smith	(England)	CM	2026	24 December 2006 (age 19)	(England) Hertford Town FC
20	Mauro Vilhete	(Portugal)	CM	2025	10 May 1993 (age 33)	(England) Hampton & Richmond Borough FC
7	George Williams	(Wales)	LW	2023	7 September 1995 (age 31)	(England) Boreham Wood FC
20	Jake Watkiss	(England)	LW	2026	15 March 2005 (age 21)	(England) Watford academy FC
11	Jesse Effa	(Italy)	RW	2026	12 June 2005 (age 21)	(England) Cheshunt FC
Forwards
9	Remaye Campbell	(England)	CF	2026	7 July 2000 (age 26)	(England) Hereford FC
10	Jake Tabor	(England)	CF	2026	26 August 2003 (age 23)	(England) Swindon Town FC
19	Marshall Francis	(England)	CF	2026	25 February 2005 (age 21)	(England) Sheffield United academy FC

== Transfers and contracts ==
=== In ===
Date	Pos.	Player	From	Fee
1 July 2026	CB	(England) David Longe-King	(England) Hampton & Richmond Borough	Free
1 July 2026	RW	(Italy) Jesse Effa	(England) Cheshunt	Free
1 July 2026	CM	(British Virgin Islands) T'Sharne Gallimore	(England) Bedford Town	Free
1 July 2026	CM	(England) Cameron Forde-Brown	(England) King's Lynn Town	Free
9 July 2026	CF	(England) Marshall Francis	(England) Sheffield United U21	Free
24 July 2026	ST	(England) jake Tabor	(England) Swindon Town FC	Free
7 August 2026	LB	(England) Stefan Parkes	(England) Walton & Hersham FC	Free
7 August 2026	CB	(England) David Agbontohoma	(England) Maidstone FC	Free
8 August 2026	GK	(England) James Taylor	(England) Newcastle United academy FC	Free
8 August 2026	CM	(England) Billy Mardell-Smith	(England) Hertford Town FC	Free
28 August 2026	LW	(England) Leo Cole	(England) Abingdon United FC	Free

== Pre-season and friendlies ==
On 28 May 2026, Hemel Hempstead announced their Pre-season fixtures, with all of them being announced at the same time, with the fixture against walthamstow F.C on the 28th July being cancelled

Win Draw Loss Fixtures

07 July 2026 Friendly	Hemel Hempstead Town	1-5	Queens Park Rangers U21	Hemel Hempstead, England
19:45 CEST	Trialist 7 54'	Report	Rocco Friel 51'; OG 67'; rico Kennedy 51'; Trialist B 51'; Trialist B 51'	Stadium: Focus Community Arena; Attendance: 0

11 July 2026 Friendly	Hemel Hempstead Town	1-2	Barnet FC	Hemel Hempstead, England
15:00 CEST	Charlie Rowan 16'	Report	Jack Maskell 22'; Trialist D 89'	Stadium: Focus Community Arena

14 July 2026 Friendly	Hemel Hempstead Town	1-2	Oxford City	Hemel Hempstead, England
19:45 CEST	steele 80'	Report	Brown 29'; Taylor (P) 74'; 18 July 2026 Friendly / Wealdstone / 1-0 / Hemel Hempstead Town / Wealdstone, England; 15:00 CEST / Trialist C 1' / Report / / Stadium: Grosvenor Vale	Stadium: Focus Community Arena

21 July 2026 Friendly	Hendon	1-5	Hemel Hempstead Town	Hendon, England
19:45 CEST				Stadium: Silver Jubilee Park

25 July 2026 Friendly	kettering Town	1-3	Hemel Hempstead Town	Kettering, England
15:00 CEST				Stadium: Latimer Park

28 July 2026 Friendly	St Albans City	1-1	Hemel Hempstead Town	St Albans, England
19:45 CEST				Stadium: Clarence Park

== Season Summary ==
=== August ===
Hemel Hempstead Town started their National League South campaign against Chelmsford City F.C on the 8th August 2026 in a 1-1 draw.

== Emirates FA Cup ==
Hemel Hempstead Town entered the Second qualifying round of the FA cup, and were drawn against Wingate & Finchley

Win Draw Loss Fixtures

19 September 2026 Second qualifying round	Hemel Hempstead Town	1-1	Wingate & Finchley F.C.	Hemel Hempstead
15:00 GMT	jake tabor 69'			Stadium: Vauxhall road stadium

=== Results by round ===
Round	1	2	3	4	5	6	7	8	9	10	11	12	13	14	15	16	17	18	19	20	21	22	23	24	25	26	27	28	29	30	31	32	33	34	35	36	37	38	39	40	41	42	43	44	45	46
Ground	H	A	H	A	H	A	H	H	A	H	A	H	A	H	H	A	A	H	A	H	H	A	H	A	A	H	H	A	A	H	H	A	A	H	A	H	A	H	A	H	H	A	H	A	H	A
Result	D	W	L	W	L	L	D	D	D																																					
Position	11	5	13	6	11	16	17	17	16																																					
Points	1	4	4	7	7	7	8	9	10																																					

A = Away; H = Home; W = Win; D = Draw; L = Loss; P = Postponed

=== Matches ===
8 August 2026 1	Hemel Hempstead Town	1–1	Chelmsford City	Hemel Hempstead
15:00 BST	Alfie Marriott (OG) 90+9'	Report	Rhys Browne 43'	Stadium: FOCUS COMMUNITY ARENA; Attendance: 849; Referee: Matty Buonassisi

15 August 2026 2	farnborough	0-2	Hemel Hempstead Town	farnborough
15:00 BST			Stefan Parkes 14'; Remaye Campbell 20'	Stadium: Saunders Transport Community Stadium; Attendance: 936; Referee: George Warren

18 August 2026 3	Hemel Hempstead Town	0-1	Maidenhead United	Hemel Hempstead
19:45 BST		Report	Daniel Nkrumah 16'	Stadium: FOCUS COMMUNITY ARENA; Attendance: 726; Referee: Jack Willmore

22 August 2026 4	Salisbury	1-2	Hemel Hempstead Town	Salisbury
15:00 BST				Stadium: The Raymond McEnhill Stadium; Attendance: 1,178; Referee: Phillip Eddie

29 August 2026 5	Hemel Hempstead Town	1–3	Weston super mare	Hemel Hempstead
15:00 BST		Report		Stadium: FOCUS COMMUNITY ARENA; Attendance: 471; Referee: Ayrton Hursey

31 August 2026 6	Folkestone Invicta	2-0	Hemel Hempstead Town	folkestone
15:00 BST	Joe Pigott 35'; Donell Thomas 55'	Report		Stadium: Alcaline Stadium; Attendance: 1,099

5 September 2026 7	Hemel Hempstead Town	1–1	Farnham Town	Hemel Hempstead
15:00 BST				Stadium: FOCUS COMMUNITY ARENA

8th September 2026 8	Ebbsfleet United	0-0	Hemel Hempstead Town	Ebbsfleet
19:45 BST		Report		Stadium: Stonebridge Road Stadium; Attendance: 1,208

12 September 2026 9	Hemel Hempstead Town	1–1	Tonbridge Angels	Hemel Hempstead
15:00 BST	Harry Panayiotou 64'		Ricky Korboa 21'	Stadium: FOCUS COMMUNITY ARENA; Attendance: 546

=== Goals ===
Rank	Player	Pos.	National League south	FA Cup	FA trophy	Total
1	(England) Remaye Campbell	FW	3	0	0	3
2	(England) David Longe-King	CB	1	0	0	1
2	(England) Stefan Parkes	LB	1	0	0	1
2	(England) Josh Steele	ST	1	0	0	1
2	(England) Harry Panayiotou	ST	1	0	0	1
