= 2018–19 Notts County F.C. season =

Notts County
2018–19 season
- Owner: Alan Hardy
- Chairman: Alan Hardy
- Manager: Kevin Nolan (until 26 August); Harry Kewell (between 31 August–13 November); Neal Ardley (from 28 November)
- Stadium: Meadow Lane
- League Two: 23rd (relegated)
- FA Cup: First round
- EFL Cup: First round
- EFL Trophy: Second round
- Top goalscorer: League: Kane Hemmings (14); All: Kane Hemmings (14)
- Highest home attendance: 15,026 (league)
- Lowest home attendance: 4,119 (league); 915 (EFL trophy)
- Average home league attendance: 7,357
Home colours	Away colours

The 2018–19 season was Notts County's 156th season in their history and their fourth consecutive season in League Two. The club also competed in the FA Cup, EFL Cup and EFL Trophy. The season covers the period from 1 July 2018 to 30 June 2019.

== Competitions ==
=== Pre-season friendlies ===
County confirmed friendlies against Basford United, Derby County, Leicester City and Luton Town.

10 July 2018 Friendly	Basford United	1–3	Notts County	Basford
19:30 BST	Bateman 88'	Report	Stead 11' (pen.), 15'; He 39'	Stadium: Greenwich Avenue

14 July 2018 Friendly	Notts County	1–4	Derby County	Nottingham
15:00 BST	Hemmings 75'	Report	Thomas 2', 36'; Bennett 57'; Huddlestone 83'	Stadium: Meadow Lane

21 July 2018 Friendly	Notts County	1–4	Leicester City	Nottingham
15:00 BST	Alessandra 20'	Report	Morgan 26'; Choudhury 28'; Gray 53'; Slimani 76'	Stadium: Meadow Lane

28 July 2018 Friendly	Luton Town	2–0	Notts County	Luton
15:00 BST	Grant 49'; Lee 63'	Report		Stadium: Kenilworth Road

=== League Two ===
==== League table ====
Pos	Team	Pld	W	D	L	GF	GA	GD	Pts	Promotion, qualification or relegation
20	Port Vale	46	12	13	21	39	55	−16	49	
21	Cambridge United	46	12	11	23	40	66	−26	47	
22	Macclesfield Town	46	10	14	22	48	74	−26	44	
23	Notts County (R)	46	9	14	23	48	84	−36	41	Relegation to the National League
24	Yeovil Town (R)	46	9	13	24	41	66	−25	40	Relegation to the National League

Source: EFL Official Website
Rules for classification: 1) Points; 2) Goal difference; 3) Number of goals scored; 4) Head-to-head results
(R) Relegated

==== Results summary ====
Overall								Home						Away					
Pld	W	D	L	GF	GA	GD	Pts	W	D	L	GF	GA	GD	W	D	L	GF	GA	GD
46	9	14	23	48	84	−36	41	5	9	9	23	34	−11	4	5	14	25	50	−25

Last updated: 4 May 2019.
Source: BBC

==== Results by matchday ====
Matchday	1	2	3	4	5	6	7	8	9	10	11	12	13	14	15	16	17	18	19	20	21	22	23	24	25	26	27	28	29	30	31	32	33	34	35	36	37	38	39	40	41	42	43	44	45	46
Ground	H	A	H	A	A	H	A	H	A	H	H	A	A	A	H	A	H	H	A	H	A	H	A	H	H	A	A	H	A	H	A	H	H	A	H	A	A	H	H	A	H	A	H	A	H	A
Result	D	L	L	L	L	L	L	D	D	W	W	W	L	L	L	D	D	L	D	D	L	W	L	L	D	L	D	L	L	D	W	W	L	L	D	L	W	D	L	W	D	L	L	D	W	L
Position	14	18	21	24	24	24	24	24	23	22	20	17	21	22	22	22	22	23	23	23	23	23	23	24	24	24	24	24	24	24	24	24	24	24	24	24	23	24	24	23	23	24	24	24	23	23

Updated to match(es) played on 4 May 2019. Source: BBC
A = Away; H = Home; W = Win; D = Draw; L = Loss

==== Matches ====
On 21 June 2018, the League Two fixtures for the forthcoming season were announced.

4 August 2018 1	Notts County	0–0	Colchester United	Nottingham
15:00 BST		Report		Stadium: Meadow Lane; Attendance: 7,136; Referee: Seb Stockbridge

11 August 2018 2	Cambridge United	3–2	Notts County	Cambridge
15:00 BST	Azeez 46', 61'; Corr 90+1'	Report	Boldewijn 29'; Duffy 78'	Stadium: Abbey Stadium; Attendance: 4,372; Referee: Andy Haines

17 August 2018 3	Notts County	0–4	Yeovil Town	Nottingham
19:45 BST		Report	Fisher 34', 36', 72'; Arquin 83'	Stadium: Meadow Lane; Attendance: 7,439; Referee: Simon Hooper

21 August 2018 4	Newport County	3–2	Notts County	Newport
19:45 BST	Frank 24'; Harris 26'; Matt 90'	Report	Hemmings 12'; Dennis 87'	Stadium: Rodney Parade; Attendance: 2,935; Referee: Alan Young

25 August 2018 5	Lincoln City	3–1	Notts County	Lincoln
15:00 BST	Frecklington 7'; Andrade 33'; Anderson 55'	Report	Kellett 19'	Stadium: Sincil Bank; Attendance: 9,119; Referee: Scott Duncan

1 September 2018 6	Notts County	1–3	Forest Green Rovers	Nottingham
15:00 BST	Stead 70'	Report	Shephard 29'; Reid 59'; Grubb 84'	Stadium: Meadow Lane; Attendance: 6,049; Referee: Peter Wright

8 September 2018 7	Exeter City	5–1	Notts County	Exeter
15:00 BST	Sweeney 16' 58' (pen.); Stockley 18' 74'; Martin 90'	Report	Boldewijn 43'	Stadium: St James Park; Attendance: 3,916; Referee: Neil Hair

15 September 2018 8	Notts County	3–3	Stevenage	Nottingham
15:00 BST	Stead 22' (pen.); Boldewijn 43'; Hemmings 49'	Report	Kennedy 38'; Revell 45'; Newton 73'	Stadium: Meadow Lane; Attendance: 6,085; Referee: Ross Joyce

22 September 2018 9	Northampton Town	0–0	Notts County	Northampton
15:00 BST		Report		Stadium: Sixfields Stadium; Attendance: 4,935; Referee: Paul Marsden

29 September 2018 10	Notts County	2–1	Crewe Alexandra	Nottingham
15:00 BST	Milsom 5'; Hewitt 61'	Report	Bowery 14'	Stadium: Meadow Lane; Attendance: 6,117; Referee: Andy Woolmer

2 October 2018 11	Notts County	3–1	Crawley Town	Nottingham
19:45 BST	Hemmings 9'; Stead 33'; Milsom (red card) 66'; Thomas 87'	Report	Poleon 90+3'	Stadium: Meadow Lane; Attendance: 5,098; Referee: David Webb

6 October 2018 12	Macclesfield Town	0–1	Notts County	Macclesfield
15:00 BST	Vincenti (yellow card) 52'; O'Hara (yellow card) 80'	Report	Brisley (yellow card) 64'; Stead 82' (pen.)	Stadium: Moss Rose; Attendance: 2,381; Referee: Matt Donohue

20 October 2018 13	Bury	4–0	Notts County	Bury
15:00 BST	Maynard 11'; Telford 18'; O'Shea 65' (pen.); Adams 88'	Report		Stadium: Gigg Lane; Attendance: 4,103; Referee: Carl Boyeson

23 October 2018 14	Milton Keynes Dons	2–1	Notts County	Denbigh
19:45 BST	Aneke 60' (pen.); Healey 69'	Report	Alessandra 23'; Turley (red card) 58'	Stadium: Stadium mk Attendance: 6,501; Referee: Michael Salisbury

27 October 2018 15	Notts County	1–2	Swindon Town	Nottingham
15:00 BST	Hemmings 40'; Hewitt (yellow card) 43'; Milsom (yellow card) 55'; Stead (yellow card) 65'	Report	McCourt (yellow card) 15'; Nelson (yellow card) 43'; Alzate 65'; Turley 80' (og.); Knoyle (yellow card) 90+1'; Adebayo (yellow card) 90+4'	Stadium: Meadow Lane; Attendance: 6,114; Referee: Ross Joyce

3 November 2018 16	Port Vale	2–2	Notts County	Burslem
15:00 GMT	Hannant 13'; Pope 89'	Report	Hemmings 22'; Ward 87'	Stadium: Vale Park; Attendance: 4,236; Referee: Lee Swabey

6 November 2018 17	Notts County	0–0	Oldham Athletic	Nottingham
19:45 GMT		Report		Stadium: Meadow Lane; Attendance: 4,487; Referee: Ollie Yates

17 November 2018 18	Notts County	0–3	Cheltenham Town	Nottingham
15:00 GMT		Report	Varney 35', 66'; Barnett 87'	Stadium: Meadow Lane; Attendance: 6,109; Referee: Darren Drysdale

24 November 2018 19	Morecambe	1–1	Notts County	Morecambe
15:00 GMT	Ellison 88'	Report	Dennis 52'	Stadium: Globe Arena; Attendance: 1,658; Referee: Dean Whitestone

27 November 2018 20	Notts County	1–1	Carlisle United	Nottingham
19:45 GMT	Hewitt 63'	Report	Yates 84'	Stadium: Meadow Lane; Attendance: 4,119; Referee: Thomas Bramall

8 December 2018 21	Mansfield Town	2–0	Notts County	Mansfield
13:00 GMT	Hamilton 37', 63'	Report		Stadium: Field Mill; Attendance: 6,604; Referee: Jeremy Simpson

15 December 2018 22	Notts County	3–2	Tranmere Rovers	Nottingham
15:00 GMT	Stead (yellow card) 27' (goal) 33', 76' (pen.); Hemmings 44'; Fitzsimons (yellow card) 58'	Report	Smith 38'; Jennings 58' (yellow card) 59'	Stadium: Meadow Lane; Attendance: 6,535; Referee: Robert Lewis

22 December 2018 23	Grimsby Town	4–0	Notts County	Cleethorpes
15:00 GMT	Clifton 4'; Davis 37', 66'; Rose (yellow card) 69'; Thomas (yellow card) 75' (goal) 88'	Report	Hewitt (yellow card) 75'	Stadium: Blundell Park; Attendance: 4,946; Referee: David Webb

26 December 2018 24	Notts County	1–2	Macclesfield Town	Nottingham
15:00 GMT	Hemmings 64'; Dennis (yellow card) 90+5'; Davies (red card) 90+8'	Report	Wilson 36', 81'; Maycock (yellow card) 90'; Smith (red card) 90+4'	Stadium: Meadow Lane; Attendance: 6,786; Referee: Paul Marsden

29 December 2018 25	Notts County	0–0	Bury	Nottingham
15:00 GMT	Milsom (yellow card) 21'; Kellett (yellow card) 39'; Vaughan (yellow card) 65'; Stead (penalty missed) 74'; Bird (yellow card) 84'	Report	Thompson (yellow card) 63'	Stadium: Meadow Lane; Attendance: 7,014; Referee: Brett Huxtable

1 January 2019 26	Oldham Athletic	2–0	Notts County	Oldham
15:00 GMT	Missilou (yellow card) 33'; Hamer 40'; Clarke 47'	Report	Oxlade-Chamberlain (yellow card) 78' (yellow-red card) 83'	Stadium: Boundary Park; Attendance: 4,336; Referee: Anthony Backhouse

5 January 2019 27	Colchester United	3–3	Notts County	Colchester
15:00 GMT	Szmodics 8'; Mandron 45+3'; Pell 67' (pen.) (yellow card) 90+2'	Report	Stead 16'; Jones 19'; Dennis 32'	Stadium: Colchester Community Stadium; Attendance: 3,181; Referee: Charles Breakspear

12 January 2019 28	Notts County	0–1	Cambridge United	Nottingham
15:00 GMT		Report	Taylor 41'; Amoo (yellow card) 53'; Azeez (yellow card) 81'	Stadium: Meadow Lane; Attendance: 15,026; Referee: John Busby

19 January 2019 29	Yeovil Town	2–0	Notts County	Yeovil
15:00 GMT	James 8' (yellow card) 53'; Dobre 90+2'	Report	Barclay (yellow card) 45+1'; Vaughan (yellow card) 51'	Stadium: Huish Park; Attendance: 2,716; Referee: Steve Martin

2 February 2019 30	Notts County	1–1	Lincoln City	Nottingham
15:00 GMT	Stead 2' (pen.); Boldewijn (yellow card) 20'; Stubbs (yellow card) 71'; Doyle (yellow card) 85'; Milsom (yellow card) 90+5'	Report	Andrade 45+4'; Akinde (penalty missed) 86'	Stadium: Meadow Lane; Attendance: 10,641; Referee: Antony Coggins

9 February 2019 31	Forest Green Rovers	1–2	Notts County	Nailsworth
15:00 GMT	Doidge (yellow card) 39'; Mills 63'	Report	O'Brien 57' (yellow card) 76'; Schofield (yellow card) 62'; Boldewijn 77'; Barclay (yellow card) 79'; Hemmings (yellow card) 90'; Milsom (yellow card) 90+1'	Stadium: The New Lawn; Attendance: 2,871; Referee: Neil Hair

16 February 2019 32	Notts County	1–0	Mansfield Town	Nottingham
13:00 GMT	Mackail-Smith 19'; Stead (yellow card) 32'; Boldewijn (yellow card) 81'	Report	Turner (yellow card) 6'; Mellis (yellow card) 59'; Pearce (yellow card) 85'	Stadium: Meadow Lane; Attendance: 12,660; Referee: Lee Mason

19 February 2019 33	Notts County	1–4	Newport County	Nottingham
19:45 GMT	Hemmings 10'	Report	Franks 9' (yellow card) 55'; Matt 15', 33'; Labadie (yellow card) 24'; Bennett (yellow card) 27'; Amond 47'	Stadium: Meadow Lane; Attendance: 6,253; Referee: Simon Hooper

23 February 2019 34	Tranmere Rovers	1–0	Notts County	Birkenhead
15:00 GMT	Perkins (yellow card) 24'; Jennings 69'	Report	Hemmings (yellow card) 60'; Doyle (yellow card) 73'	Stadium: Prenton Park; Attendance: 6,559; Referee: Scott Oldham

2 March 2019 35	Notts County	0–0	Port Vale	Nottingham
15:00 GMT		Report	Conlon (yellow card) 40'; Pope (yellow card) 62'	Stadium: Meadow Lane; Attendance: 7,457; Referee: Craig Hicks

9 March 2019 36	Cheltenham Town	4–1	Notts County	Cheltenham
15:00 GMT	Boyle 29'; Varney 36' (pen.); Waters 55'; Barnett 88'	Report	Hemmings 69' (pen.); Rose (yellow card) 72'	Stadium: Whaddon Road; Attendance: 3,514; Referee: Thomas Bramall

12 March 2019 37	Carlisle United	1–3	Notts County	Carlisle
19:45 GMT	Gerrard (yellow card) 66'; Hope 76'; Devitt (yellow card) 90+6'	Report	Milsom (yellow card) 23'; Hemmings 37', 66' (pen.); Rose (yellow card) 87'; O'Brien (yellow card) 90+3'; Alessandra 90+4'	Stadium: Brunton Park; Attendance: 3,514; Referee: Eddie Ilderton

16 March 2019 38	Notts County	0–0	Morecambe	Nottingham
15:00 GMT	Rose (yellow card) 50'; Doyle (yellow card) 90+5'	Report	Bennett (yellow card) 14'; Mingoia (yellow card) 33'; Cranston (yellow card) 67'; Fleming (yellow card) 86'; Halstead (yellow card) 90+5'	Stadium: Meadow Lane; Attendance: 5,813; Referee: Kevin Johnson

23 March 2019 39	Notts County	0–1	Exeter City	Nottingham
15:00 GMT	Milsom (yellow card) 72'	Report	Bowman (yellow card) 17' (yellow-red card) 23'; Moxey (yellow card) 19'; Law 90+3'	Stadium: Meadow Lane; Attendance: 9,505; Referee: Carl Boyeson

30 March 2019 40	Stevenage	0–3	Notts County	Stevenage
15:00 GMT		Report	O'Brien 1'; Hemmings 21'; Boldewijn 45'	Stadium: Broadhall Way; Attendance: 2,860; Referee: Andy Haines

6 April 2019 41	Notts County	2–2	Northampton Town	Nottingham
15:00 BST	Rose 27' (yellow card) 63'; Duffy (yellow card) 45+2'; Schofield (red card) 46'; Hemmings 52' (yellow card) 62'	Report	Goode (yellow card) 4'; Turnbull (yellow card) 39'; Powell 44'; Hoskins 50' (yellow card) 77'; Cornell (yellow card) 55'; Pierre (yellow card) 83'	Stadium: Meadow Lane; Attendance: 7,129; Referee: Ben Toner

13 April 2019 42	Crewe Alexandra	3–0	Notts County	Crewe
15:00 BST	Taylor-Sinclair 31'; Wintle 77'; Jones 83'	Report	Hemmings (yellow card) 43'; O'Brien (yellow card) 85'	Stadium: Gresty Road; Attendance: 4,316; Referee: Matt Donohue

19 April 2019 43	Notts County	1–2	Milton Keynes Dons	Nottingham
15:00 BST	Mackail-Smith (yellow card) 73'; Barclay 90+4'	Report	Wheeler 62'; Aneke 85'	Stadium: Meadow Lane; Attendance: 7,130; Referee: Tony Harrington

22 April 2019 44	Crawley Town	1–1	Notts County	Crawley
15:00 BST	Nathaniel-George 19'	Report	Mackail-Smith 8'; Milsom (yellow card) 45'; Barclay (red card) 54'	Stadium: Broadfield Stadium; Attendance: 2,800; Referee: Graham Salisbury

27 April 2019 45	Notts County	2–1	Grimsby Town	Nottingham
15:00 BST	Stubbs (yellow card) 48'; Mackail-Smith 48'; Rose (yellow card) 55'; Clifton 67' (o.g.)	Report	Hall-Johnson (yellow card) 50'; Whitmore 90+3'	Stadium: Meadow Lane; Attendance: 8,519; Referee: Andy Haines

4 May 2019 46	Swindon Town	3–1	Notts County	Swindon
15:00 BST	Doughty (yellow card) 38'; Woolery 69'; Robinson 74', 90+2'	Report	Hemmings 52' (pen.)	Stadium: County Ground; Attendance: 8,676; Referee: Steve Martin

=== FA Cup ===
The first round draw was made live on BBC by Dennis Wise and Dion Dublin on 22 October.

10 November 2018 First round	Barnsley	4–0	Notts County	Barnsley
15:00 GMT	Woodrow 48'; Fryers 53'; Potts 77'; Moore 81'	Report		Stadium: Oakwell; Attendance: 5,878; Referee: Sebastian Stockbridge

=== EFL Cup ===
On 15 June 2018, the draw for the first round was made in Vietnam.

14 August 2018 First round	Middlesbrough	3–3 (4–3 p)	Notts County	Middlesbrough
19:00 BST	Fletcher 27', 74'; Mahmutović 44'; Leadbitter (yellow card) 48'	Report	Duffy (yellow card) 8'; Crawford 20'; Stead 34', 63'	Stadium: Riverside Stadium; Attendance: 9,942; Referee: Anthony Backhouse
	Penalties
	Leadbitter (penalty scored); McNair (penalty scored); Walker (penalty scored); Tavernier (penalty scored)		Stead (penalty missed); Alessandra (penalty scored); Hawkridge (penalty scored); Patching (penalty scored); Jones (penalty missed)

=== EFL Trophy ===
On 13 July 2018, the initial group stage draw bar the U21 invited clubs was announced. The draw for the second round was made live on Talksport by Leon Britton and Steve Claridge on 16 November.

Pos	Lge	Team	Pld	W	PW	PL	L	GF	GA	GD	Pts	Qualification
1	ACA	Newcastle United U21	3	3	0	0	0	8	3	+5	9	Round 2
2	L2	Notts County	3	1	0	0	2	5	6	−1	3	Round 2
3	L1	Doncaster Rovers	3	1	0	0	2	5	7	−2	3	
4	L2	Grimsby Town	3	1	0	0	2	4	6	−2	3	

Source: EFL.com

4 September 2018 Grp. G (North) — G1	Grimsby Town	2–1	Notts County	Blundell Park
19:45 BST	Rose 69' (pen.); Reid 88'	Report	Alessandra 12'	Attendance: 746; Referee: Tom Nield

9 October 2018 Grp. G (North) — G2	Notts County	0–2	Newcastle United U21s	Meadow Lane
19:45 BST		Report	Roberts 10' (pen.); Sorensen 56'	Attendance: 1,139

14 November 2018 Grp. G (North) — G3	Notts County	4–2	Doncaster Rovers	Meadow Lane
19:45 GMT	Dennis 15', 40', 64' (pen.); Boldewijn 26'	Report	May 50', 70'	Attendance: 915

4 December 2018 Second round	Sunderland	2–0	Notts County	Sunderland
19:45 GMT	Jones 22' (o.g.); Sinclair 72' (pen.)	Report		Stadium: Stadium of Light; Attendance: 8,580

== First-Team squad ==
No.	Name	Pos.	Nat.	Place of birth	Age	Apps	Goals	Signed from	Date signed	Fee	Ends
Goalkeepers
1	Ross Fitzsimons	GK	(England)	London	32	40	0	Chelmsford	27 July 2017	Trainee	2020
13	Branislav Pindroch	GK	(Slovakia)	Banskà Bystrica	34	5	0	MFK Karviná	31 July 2017	Free	2020
Defenders
2	Matt Tootle	RB	(England)	Knowsley	35	92	4	Shrewsbury Town	1 July 2016	Free	2020
3	Pierce Bird	CB	(England)	Nottingham	27	4	0	Academy	31 July 2017	Trainee	Undisclosed
4	Elliott Hewitt	RB/CM	(Wales)	Rhyl	32	142	7	Ipswich Town	4 August 2015	Free	2019
5	Richard Duffy	CB	(Wales)	Swansea	41	105	8	Eastleigh	1 July 2016	Free	Undisclosed
6	Ben Hall	CB	(Northern Ireland)	Omagh	29	11	0	Brighton & Hove Albion	1 July 2018	Loan	2019
12	Christian Oxlade-Chamberlain	RM	(England)	Portsmouth	28	2	0	Portsmouth	1 August 2018	Free	Undisclosed
16	Shaun Brisley	CB	(England)	Macclesfield	36	61	3	Carlisle United	24 July 2017	Free	Undisclosed
19	Elliott Ward	CB	(England)	Harrow	41	12	1	Blackburn Rovers	3 September 2018	Free	Undisclosed
21	Keston Davies	CB	(England)	Swansea	29	1	0	Swansea	31 August 2018	Free	Undisclosed
23	Daniel Jones	LB	(England)	Rowley Regis	39	48	4	Chesterfield	3 July 2017	Free	2020
25	Cedric Evina	CB	(France)		34	10	0	Doncaster Rovers		Free	Undisclosed
26	Jamie Turley	CB	(England)	Reading	36	10	0	Newport County	14 Sep 2018	Free	Undisclosed
36	Tyreece Kennedy-Williams	CB	(England)		25	1	0		8 October 2018		
Midfielders
8	David Vaughan	DM	(Wales)	Abergele	43	11	0	Nottingham Forest	6 July 2018	Free	2019
10	Nathan Thomas	LW	(England)	Ingleby Barwick	31	14	1	Sheffield United	3 July 2018	Loan	2019
14	Andy Kellett	LB	(England)	Bolton	32	8	1	Wigan Athletic	1 July 2018	Free	2020
17	Noor Husin	CM	(Afghanistan)	Mazar-i-Sharif	21	27	2	Crystal Palace	12 January 2018	Undisclosed	2019
18	Terry Hawkridge	RM	(England)	Nottingham	36	41	3	Lincoln City	1 July 2017	Free	2019
20	Will Patching	CM	(England)	Manchester	27	3	0	Manchester City	1 July 2018	Free	2020
22	Tom Crawford	CM	(England)	Chester	27	4	1	Chester	1 July 2018	Undisclosed	Undisclosed
24	Robert Milsom	LM	(England)	Redhill	31	91	2	Crawley Town		Free	
31	Sam Osborne	CF	(England)	Nottingham	27	6	0	Dunkirk	1 July 2016	Free	2018
32	Alex Howes	CM	(England)	Nottingham	26	4	0	Academy		Trainee	Undisclosed
Forwards
7	Lewis Alessandra	RW	(England)	Heywood	37	63	9	Hartlepool United	1 July 2017	Undisclosed	2019
9	Kristian Dennis	CF	(England)	Manchester	36	14	1	Chesterfield	1 July 2018	£150,000	2021
11	Enzio Boldewijn	RW	(Netherlands)	Almere	33	18	3	Crawley Town	4 July 2018	Undisclosed	2021
15	Kane Hemmings	CF	(England)	Burton upon Trent	34	17	5	Oxford United	1 July 2018	Undisclosed	2020
30	Jon Stead	CF	(England)	Huddersfield	43	157	47	Huddersfield Town	2 July 2015	Free	2019
34	Remaye Campbell	CF	(England)	Nottingham	25	2	0		1 July 2018		
37	Kion Etete	CF	(England)			2	0		8 October 2018		

=== Statistics ===
As of match played 4 May 2019

No.	Pos	Nat	Player	Total		League Two		FA Cup		League Cup		League Trophy	
No.	Pos	Nat	Player	Apps	Goals	Apps	Goals	Apps	Goals	Apps	Goals	Apps	Goals
1	GK	(England) ENG	Ross Fitzsimons	34	0	28+1	0	1+0	0	1+0	0	3+0	0
2	DF	(England) ENG	Matt Tootle	24	0	22+2	0	0+0	0	0+0	0	0+0	0
3	DF	(England) ENG	Pierce Bird	13	0	8+4	0	0+0	0	1+0	0	0+0	0
4	DF	(Wales) WAL	Elliott Hewitt	30	2	23+2	2	1+0	0	1+0	0	2+1	0
5	DF	(Wales) WAL	Richard Duffy	22	1	17+2	1	0+0	0	1+0	0	2+0	0
6	FW	(England) ENG	Ben Barclay	13	1	12+1	1	0+0	0	0+0	0	0+0	0
7	FW	(England) ENG	Lewis Alessandra	28	3	16+9	2	1+0	0	1+0	0	1+0	1
8	MF	(Wales) WAL	David Vaughan	25	0	19+4	0	0+0	0	0+0	0	2+0	0
9	FW	(England) ENG	Kristian Dennis	29	6	13+11	3	1+0	0	0+0	0	3+1	3
10	FW	(England) ENG	Nathan Thomas	29	1	14+11	1	1+0	0	0+0	0	3+0	0
10	FW	(England) ENG	Virgil Gomis	10	0	5+5	0	0+0	0	0+0	0	0+0	0
11	FW	(Netherlands) NED	Enzio Boldewijn	39	6	33+3	5	1+0	0	0+0	0	2+0	1
12	MF	(England) ENG	Christian Oxlade-Chamberlain	3	0	1+1	0	0+0	0	0+0	0	1+0	0
13	GK	(Slovakia) SVK	Branislav Pindroch	1	0	0+0	0	0+0	0	0+0	0	1+0	0
14	MF	(England) ENG	Andy Kellett	16	1	4+7	1	0+0	0	1+0	0	2+2	0
15	FW	(England) ENG	Kane Hemmings	37	14	30+6	14	0+0	0	0+0	0	1+0	0
16	DF	(England) ENG	Shaun Brisley	26	0	17+3	0	1+0	0	0+1	0	4+0	0
17	MF	(Afghanistan) AFG	Noor Husin	18	0	6+8	0	0+0	0	1+0	0	2+1	0
18	MF	(England) ENG	Terry Hawkridge	7	0	2+2	0	0+0	0	1+0	0	2+0	0
18	MF	(England) ENG	Sam Stubbs	17	0	17+0	0	0+0	0	0+0	0	0+0	0
19	DF	(England) ENG	Elliott Ward	19	1	16+1	1	1+0	0	0+0	0	1+0	0
20	MF	(England) ENG	Will Patching	10	0	3+3	0	0+0	0	0+1	0	3+0	0
21	MF	(Wales) WAL	Keston Davies	7	0	6+1	0	0+0	0	0+0	0	0+0	0
21	MF	(Scotland) SCO	Jim O’Brien	18	2	18+0	2	0+0	0	0+0	0	0+0	0
22	MF	(England) ENG	Tom Crawford	6	1	1+3	0	0+0	0	1+0	1	0+1	0
23	DF	(England) ENG	Daniel Jones	18	1	13+0	1	0+1	0	1+0	0	3+0	0
24	MF	(England) ENG	Rob Milsom	42	1	37+1	1	1+0	0	0+0	0	3+0	0
25	DF	(Cameroon) CMR	Cedric Evina	19	0	15+2	0	1+0	0	0+0	0	0+1	0
26	DF	(England) ENG	Jamie Turley	19	0	17+1	0	1+0	0	0+0	0	0+0	0
26	MF	(England) ENG	Mitch Rose	17	1	17+0	1	0+0	0	0+0	0	0+0	0
27	GK	(England) ENG	Ryan Schofield	17	0	17+0	0	0+0	0	0+0	0	0+0	0
28	FW	(Scotland) SCO	Craig Mackail-Smith	16	3	11+5	3	0+0	0	0+0	0	0+0	0
30	FW	(England) ENG	Jon Stead	41	10	30+8	8	0+0	0	1+0	2	1+1	0
31	FW	(England) ENG	Sam Osborne	3	0	0+2	0	0+0	0	0+0	0	1+0	0
32	FW	(England) ENG	Alex Howes	1	0	0+0	0	0+0	0	0+0	0	0+1	0
33	DF	(England) ENG	Declan Dunn	1	0	0+0	0	0+1	0	0+0	0	0+0	0
34	FW	(England) ENG	Remaye Campbell	2	0	0+0	0	0+0	0	0+1	0	0+1	0
36	FW	(England) ENG	Tyreece Kennedy-Williams	1	0	0+0	0	0+0	0	0+0	0	1+0	0
37	FW	(England) ENG	Kion Etete	6	0	0+4	0	0+1	0	0+0	0	0+1	0
43	MF	(Republic of Ireland) IRL	Michael Doyle	17	0	17+0	0	0+0	0	0+0	0	0+0	0

==== Goals scored ====
As of match played 4 May 2019

Rank	No.	Nat.	Pos.	Name	League Two	FA Cup	League Cup	League Trophy	Total
1	15	(England)	CF	Kane Hemmings	14	0	0	0	14
2	30	(England)	CF	Jon Stead	8	0	2	0	10
3	9	(England)	CF	Kristian Dennis	3	0	0	3	6
3	11	(Netherlands)	RW	Enzio Boldewijn	5	0	0	1	6
5	7	(England)	RW	Lewis Alessandra	2	0	0	1	3
5	28	(Scotland)	CF	Craig Mackail-Smith	3	0	0	0	3
7	4	(Wales)	CM	Elliott Hewitt	2	0	0	0	2
7	21	(Scotland)	CM	Jim O’Brien	2	0	0	0	2
9	5	(Wales)	CB	Richard Duffy	1	0	0	0	1
9	6	(England)	CB	Ben Barclay	1	0	0	0	1
9	10	(England)	LW	Nathan Thomas	1	0	0	0	1
9	14	(England)	LB	Andy Kellett	1	0	0	0	1
9	19	(England)	LB	Elliott Ward	1	0	0	0	1
9	22	(England)	CM	Tom Crawford	0	0	1	0	1
9	23	(England)	LB	Daniel Jones	1	0	0	0	1
9	24	(England)	MF	Robert Milsom	1	0	0	0	1
9	26	(England)	MF	Mitch Rose	1	0	0	0	1
Total					47	0	3	5	55

==== Disciplinary record ====
As of match played 4 May 2019

Rank	No.	Nat.	Pos.	Name	League Two			FA Cup			League Cup			League Trophy			Total		
Rank	No.	Nat.	Pos.	Name	Booked	Double yellow card	Sent off (straight red)	Booked	Double yellow card	Sent off (straight red)	Booked	Double yellow card	Sent off (straight red)	Booked	Double yellow card	Sent off (straight red)	Booked	Double yellow card	Sent off (straight red)
1	24	(England)	MF	Robert Milsom	8	0	1	1	0	0	0	0	0	1	0	0	10	0	1
2	26	(England)	CB	Jamie Turley	3	0	1	0	0	0	0	0	0	0	0	0	3	0	1
3	6	(England)	CB	Ben Barclay	2	0	1	0	0	0	0	0	0	0	0	0	2	0	1
4	23	(England)	LB	Daniel Jones	1	0	1	0	0	0	0	0	0	0	0	0	1	0	1
4	27	(England)	GK	Ryan Schofield	1	0	1	0	0	0	0	0	0	0	0	0	1	0	1
6	21	(Wales)	CB	Keston Davies	0	0	1	0	0	0	0	0	0	0	0	0	0	0	1
7	4	(Wales)	CB	Elliott Hewitt	8	0	0	0	0	0	0	0	0	1	0	0	9	0	0
8	8	(Wales)	DM	David Vaughan	5	0	0	0	0	0	0	0	0	2	0	0	7	0	0
9	15	(England)	FW	Kane Hemmings	5	0	0	0	0	0	0	0	0	0	0	0	5	0	0
9	25	(England)	CM	Mitch Rose	5	0	0	0	0	0	0	0	0	0	0	0	5	0	0
9	5	(Wales)	CB	Richard Duffy	2	0	0	0	0	0	1	0	0	1	0	0	4	0	0
12	11	(Netherlands)	FW	Enzio Boldewijn	4	0	0	0	0	0	0	0	0	0	0	0	4	0	0
12	16	(England)	CB	Shaun Brisley	3	0	0	0	0	0	0	0	0	1	0	0	4	0	0
14	2	(England)	RB	Matt Tootle	3	0	0	0	0	0	0	0	0	0	0	0	3	0	0
14	17	(Afghanistan)	CM	Noor Husin	3	0	0	0	0	0	0	0	0	0	0	0	3	0	0
14	21	(Scotland)	CM	Jim O'Brien	3	0	0	0	0	0	0	0	0	0	0	0	3	0	0
14	30	(England)	CM	Jon Stead	3	0	0	0	0	0	0	0	0	0	0	0	3	0	0
14	43	(Republic of Ireland)	CM	Michael Doyle	3	0	0	0	0	0	0	0	0	0	0	0	3	0	0
19	9	(England)	CF	Kristian Dennis	2	0	0	0	0	0	0	0	0	0	0	0	2	0	0
19	12	(England)	RM	Christian Oxlade-Chamberlain	0	1	0	0	0	0	0	0	0	0	0	0	0	1	0
19	14	(England)	LB	Andy Kellett	1	0	0	0	0	0	0	0	0	1	0	0	2	0	0
19	18	(England)	CB	Sam Stubbs	2	0	0	0	0	0	0	0	0	0	0	0	2	0	0
19	19	(England)	CB	Elliott Ward	2	0	0	0	0	0	0	0	0	0	0	0	2	0	0
19	25	(France)	CB	Cedric Evina	2	0	0	0	0	0	0	0	0	0	0	0	2	0	0
25	1	(England)	GK	Ross Fitzsimons	1	0	0	0	0	0	0	0	0	0	0	0	1	0	0
25	3	(England)	CB	Pierce Bird	1	0	0	0	0	0	0	0	0	0	0	0	1	0	0
25	7	(England)	RW	Lewis Alessandra	1	0	0	0	0	0	0	0	0	0	0	0	1	0	0
25	10	(England)	LW	Nathan Thomas	1	0	0	0	0	0	0	0	0	0	0	0	1	0	0
25	18	(England)	RM	Terry Hawkridge	1	0	0	0	0	0	0	0	0	0	0	0	1	0	0
25	22	(England)	CM	Tom Crawford	1	0	0	0	0	0	0	0	0	0	0	0	1	0	0
25	28	(Scotland)	CF	Craig Mackail-Smith	0	0	0	0	0	0	0	0	0	1	0	0	1	0	0
25	31	(England)	MF	Sam Osborne	0	0	0	0	0	0	0	0	0	1	0	0	1	0	0
Total					78	1	6	1	0	0	1	0	0	8	0	0	88	1	6

== Transfers ==
=== Transfers in ===
Date from	Position	Nationality	Name	From	Fee	Ref.
1 July 2018	CM	(England)	Tom Crawford	Chester	Undisclosed	
1 July 2018	CF	(England)	Kristian Dennis	Chesterfield	Undisclosed	
1 July 2018	CF	(England)	Kane Hemmings	Oxford United	Undisclosed	
1 July 2018	LB	(England)	Andy Kellett	Wigan Athletic	Free transfer	
1 July 2018	CM	(England)	Will Patching	Manchester City	Free transfer	
4 July 2018	RW	(Netherlands)	Enzio Boldewijn	Crawley Town	Undisclosed	
6 July 2018	DM	(Wales)	David Vaughan	Nottingham Forest	Free transfer	
1 August 2018	RM	(England)	Christian Oxlade-Chamberlain	Portsmouth	Free transfer	
3 September 2018	CB	(England)	Elliott Ward	Blackburn Rovers	Free transfer	
13 September 2018	LB	(France)	Cedric Evina	Doncaster Rovers	Free transfer	
13 September 2018	CB	(England)	Jamie Turley	(Wales) Newport County	Free transfer	
8 January 2019	CM	(Scotland)	Jim O'Brien	Bradford City	Free transfer	
14 January 2019	CM	(England)	Robert Milsom	Crawley Town	Free transfer	
29 January 2019	CM	(England)	Mitch Rose	Grimsby Town	Free transfer	
31 January 2019	CM	(Republic of Ireland)	Michael Doyle	Coventry City	Free transfer	

=== Transfers out ===
Date from	Position	Nationality	Name	To	Fee	Ref.
1 July 2018	CF	(Nigeria)	Shola Ameobi	Free agent	Released	
1 July 2018	AM	(Scotland)	Dominic Brown-Hill	Barwell	Released	
1 July 2018	GK	(England)	Adam Collin	Carlisle United	Released	
1 July 2018	DF	(England)	Peter Dearle	Free agent	Released	
1 July 2018	LB	(England)	Carl Dickinson	Yeovil Town	Released	
1 July 2018	CB	(England)	Mike Edwards	Free agent	Released	
1 July 2018	CF	(Barbados)	Jonathan Forte	Exeter City	Released	
1 July 2018	RM	(England)	Elliot Hodge	Burton Albion	Released	
1 July 2018	RB	(England)	Nicky Hunt	Crewe Alexandra	Released	
1 July 2018	CM	(England)	Rob Milsom	Crawley Town	Released	
1 July 2018	CM	(England)	Liam Noble	Hartlepool United	Free transfer	
1 July 2018	CM	(Northern Ireland)	Michael O'Connor	Lincoln City	Rejected contract	
1 July 2018	MF	(England)	Jordon Richards	Free agent	Released	
1 July 2018	CF	(Wales)	Callum Saunders	Nantwich Town	Released	
1 July 2018	GK	(England)	Joe Searson	Free agent	Released	
1 July 2018	CM	(England)	Alan Smith	Free agent	Released	
1 July 2018	RM	(England)	Curtis Thompson	Wycombe Wanderers	Released	
11 August 2018	CF	(China)	Zhenyu He	Wolverhampton Wanderers	Undisclosed	
10 January 2019	RM	(England)	Terry Hawkridge	Free agent	Released	
14 January 2019	CB	(England)	Jamie Turley	Leyton Orient	Released	
2 February 2019	GK	(Slovakia)	Branislav Pindroch	(Slovakia) Nitra	Free transfer	

=== Loans in ===
Start date	Position	Nationality	Name	From	End date	Ref.
1 July 2018	CB	(Northern Ireland)	Ben Hall	Brighton & Hove Albion	4 January 2019	
3 July 2018	LW	(England)	Nathan Thomas	Sheffield United	29 January 2019	
31 August 2018	CB	(Wales)	Keston Davies	(Wales) Swansea City	3 January 2019	
31 August 2018	CM	(England)	Robert Milsom	Crawley Town	14 January 2019	
4 January 2019	CB	(England)	Ben Barclay	Brighton & Hove Albion	31 May 2019	
10 January 2019	GK	(England)	Ryan Schofield	Huddersfield Town	31 May 2019	
30 January 2019	CF	(Scotland)	Craig Mackail-Smith	Wycombe Wanderers	31 May 2019	
31 January 2019	CF	(France)	Virgil Gomis	Nottingham Forest	31 May 2019	
31 January 2019	CB	(England)	Sam Stubbs	Middlesbrough	31 May 2019	
12 April 2019	GK	(England)	Alex Palmer	West Bromwich Albion	19 April 2019	

=== Loans out ===
Start date	Position	Nationality	Name	To	End date	Ref.
1 November 2018	CB	(Northern Ireland)	Pierce Bird	Grantham Town	December 2018	
1 November 2018	CF	(England)	Remaye Campbell	Grantham Town	December 2018	
24 January 2019	CM	(England)	Tom Crawford	AFC Fylde	31 May 2019	
31 January 2019	CF	(England)	Kristian Dennis	Grimsby Town	31 May 2019	
