= Tyreece =

Tyreece is a given name. Notable people with the name include:

- Tyreece John-Jules (born 2001), English footballer
- Tyreece Kennedy-Williams (born 2000), English footballer
- Tyreece "T. J" Luther (born 2000), American football player
- Tyreece Simpson (born 2002), English footballer

== See also ==
- Tyrece Radford (born 1999), U.S. basketball player
- Tyreese
- Tyrese (disambiguation)
