= Sam Osborne (footballer) =

English footballer

Personal information
- Full name: Samuel Paul Osborne
- Date of birth: 10 January 1999 (age 27)
- Place of birth: Nottingham, England
- Position: Midfielder

Team information
- Current team: Harborough Town

Youth career
- Dunkirk

Senior career*
Years	Team	Apps	(Gls)
2015–2016	Dunkirk	12	(1)
2016–2020	Notts County	17	(2)
2017	→ Basford United (loan)		
2017	→ Shaw Lane (loan)		
2017–2018	→ Grantham Town (loan)	22	(4)
2020–2021	Leamington	14	(8)
2021–2022	AFC Fylde	34	(6)
2022–2024	Buxton	51	(15)
2024–2025	Boston United	19	(3)
2025–2026	Alfreton Town	17	(1)
2025–2026	→ Hereford (loan)	20	(2)
2026–	Harborough Town	5	(0)
- * Club domestic league appearances and goals as of 10:18, 3 September 2026 (UTC)

Samuel Paul Osborne (born 10 January 1999) is an English footballer who plays as a midfielder for National League North club Harborough Town. Osborne started his career at Dunkirk before moving to Notts County in 2016 where he played for four years, winning two Young Player of the Season awards before moving to Warwickshire side Leamington in 2020.

== Career ==
=== Early career ===
Osborne played youth football for Dunkirk before progressing to the senior team during the 2015–16 season.

=== Notts County ===
Osborne signed for Notts County in 2016, making his debut on 7 January 2017 in a 4–1 defeat away at Morecambe. In October 2018 he signed a professional contract with the club after impressing technical director Paul Hart in an EFL Trophy match against Newcastle United U21s. Despite this, his involvement with the first team became less frequent, and he hoped to force his way back into contention after scoring six goals in six games for the youth team.

Osborne began to feature more regularly after County's relegation to the National League. He scored his first goal for the club in September 2019 against Boreham Wood, describing it as "something he had always dreamed of". The strike was subsequently voted as the club's Goal of the Month by supporters. He ended the season with three goals in 16 appearances in all competitions and was offered a new contract, but opted to pursue more regular first team football elsewhere.

=== Leamington ===
In September 2020 Osborne signed for National League North side Leamington after a recommendation from former Leamington forward Colby Bishop, who also came through Notts County's academy. In November, he scored his first goals for the club in a 4–3 win against Alfreton Town, netting a brace to kickstart the comeback from a 3–0 half time deficit. At the end of the month he won the National League North Player of the Month award, scoring five goals as the Brakes went unbeaten.

=== AFC Fylde ===
On 9 January 2021, Osborne signed for National League North side AFC Fylde for an undisclosed fee. He was once again awarded the National League North Player of the Month Award in April 2022, scoring three goals and helping Fylde secure a place in the top three.

=== Buxton ===
On 6 October 2022, Osborne signed for fellow National League North club Buxton for an undisclosed fee.

=== Boston United ===
On 18 June 2024, Osborne signed for newly-promoted National League club Boston United. He left the club by mutual consent in February 2025.

=== Alfreton Town ===
In February 2025, Osborne joined National League North side Alfreton Town. On 2 August 2025, Osborne joined league rivals Hereford on a season-long loan.

== Career statistics ==
As of match played 14 March 2026

Appearances and goals by club, season and competition
Club	Season	League			FA Cup		EFL Cup		Other		Total	
Club	Season	Division	Apps	Goals	Apps	Goals	Apps	Goals	Apps	Goals	Apps	Goals
Dunkirk	2015–16	Mid. Premier Division	12	1	2	0	—		5 (Note: Three appearances one goal in FA Vase; one appearance in Nottinghamshire Senior Cup; one appearance in Midland Football League Cup)	1	19	2
Notts County	2016–17	League Two	3	0	0	0	0	0	0	0	3	0
Notts County	2017–18	League Two	0	0	0	0	0	0	0	0	0	0
Notts County	2018–19	League Two	2	0	0	0	0	0	1 (Note: Appearance(s) in EFL Trophy)	0	3	0
Notts County	2019–20	National League	12	2	0	0	—		4 (Note: Appearance(s) in FA Trophy)	1	16	3
Notts County	Total		17	2	0	0	0	0	5	1	22	3
Grantham Town (loan)	2017–18	NPL Premier Division	22	4	0	0	—		1 (Note: Appearance(s) in Northern Premier League Premier Division play-offs)	0	23	4
Leamington	2020–21	National League North	14	8	1	0	—		2	0	17	8
AFC Fylde	2020–21	National League North	2	0	0	0	—		0	0	2	0
AFC Fylde	2021–22	National League North	26	6	0	0	—		2 (Note: One appearance in FA Trophy; one appearance in National League North play-offs)	0	28	6
AFC Fylde	2022–23	National League North	6	0	0	0	—		0	0	6	0
AFC Fylde	Total		34	6	0	0	—		2	0	36	6
Buxton	2022–23	National League North	28	7	3	0	—		1	0	32	7
Buxton	2023–24	National League North	23	8	0	0	—		1	0	24	8
Buxton	Total		51	15	3	0	—		2	0	56	15
Boston United	2024–25	National League	19	3	0	0	—		1	1	20	4
Alfreton Town	2024–25	National League North	15	1	—		—		2 (Note: Two appearances in Derbyshire Senior Cup)	0	17	1
Alfreton Town	2025–26	National League North	3	0	—		—		0	0	2	0
Alfreton Town	Total		18	1	0	0	0	0	2	0	19	1
Hereford (loan)	2025–26	National League North	20	2	3	1	—		2	4	25	6
Career total			207	41	9	1	0	0	22	7	237	49

== Honours ==
=== Individual ===
- Notts County Young Player of the Year: 2018/19, 2019/20
- National League North Player of the Month: November 2020, April 2022
