= Will Patching =

English footballer

Personal information
- Full name: William Luke Patching
- Date of birth: 18 October 1998 (age 28)
- Place of birth: Stockport, England
- Height: 6 ft 0 in (1.83 m)
- Position: Midfielder

Team information
- Current team: Coleraine
- Number: 8

Youth career
- 2004–2018: Manchester City

Senior career*
Years	Team	Apps	(Gls)
2018–2019	Notts County	6	(0)
2020–2021	Dundalk	23	(0)
2021	→ Derry City (loan)	16	(6)
2022–2024	Derry City	95	(24)
2025–2026	Carlisle United	10	(0)
2025–2026	→ Coleraine (loan)	24	(5)
2026–	Coleraine	26	(9)

International career
2013–2014	England U16	7	(1)
2014–2015	England U17	16	(1)
2015	England U18	2	(0)
- * Club domestic league appearances and goals as of 12:49, 12 November 2026 (UTC)

William Luke Patching (born 18 October 1998) is an English professional footballer who plays as a midfielder for NIFL Premiership side Coleraine.

He joined Notts County from the Manchester City Academy in July 2018. He was released by County in August 2019, and joined Irish club Dundalk in November 2019.

A former youth team player with England up until under-18 level, participating at the 2015 FIFA U-17 World Cup.

== Club career ==
=== Notts County ===
Born in Stockport, Patching joined the Academy at Manchester City at the age of six. He signed a two-year contract with Notts County on 1 July 2018. "Magpies" manager Kevin Nolan said that "when we spoke to a couple of people at Man City they were surprised Will had been released". Patching had rejected a transfer move to Derby County only six months previously. He picked up an injury in pre-season. He made his professional debut on 14 August, coming on as a 68th-minute substitute for Noor Husin in a 3–3 draw at Middlesbrough in the EFL Cup; County lost the subsequent shoot-out despite him converting his penalty. He made his first start at Meadow Lane on 9 October, in a 2–0 defeat to Newcastle United U21s in the EFL Trophy. He made a total of ten appearances during the 2018–19 campaign as County were relegated out of the English Football League with a 23rd-place finish in League Two. On 12 August 2019, manager Neal Ardley stated that Patching could go out on loan to gain experience and match fitness, but Patching left the club by mutual consent two days later.

=== Dundalk ===
He began training with Port Vale in August 2019, but was subsequently signed by League of Ireland Premier Division team Dundalk in November 2019 ahead of the 2020 season.

On 22 February 2021 it was announced that Patching had joined fellow League of Ireland Premier Division side Derry City initially on loan until July 2021, with the option to buy.

Upon his return to Dundalk, he scored in both legs to help defeat Newtown A.F.C. and FCI Levadia Tallinn in the 2021–22 UEFA Europa Conference League qualifying phase and play-off round.

=== Derry City ===
On 22 November 2021, it was announced that Patching had signed a two-year contract with Derry City following the expiry of his contract at Dundalk, from the 2022 season.

=== Carlisle United ===
In December 2024 it was announced that Patching would join Carlisle United on 1 January 2025, on a two-and-a-half year contract.

=== Coleraine ===
On 12 June 2025, Patching joined NIFL Premiership side Coleraine on a season-long loan deal. On 5 January 2026, he joined the club on a permanent basis on a two-and-a-half year contract.

== International career ==
Patching was selected by head coach Neil Dewsnip for England's under-17 squad for the 2015 FIFA U-17 World Cup in Chile, and came on as a substitute in the group stage draws with Guinea and South Korea.

== Style of play ==
Port Vale assistant manager Dave Kevan described Patching as a "very promising young player" who was a very "creative" midfielder, "very comfortable in possession, [who] likes to join the front man and get forward".

== Career statistics ==
As of match played on 7 November 2026

Appearances and goals by club, season and competition
Club	Season	League			National Cup (Note: Includes FA Cup, FAI Cup & Irish Cup)		League Cup (Note: Includes EFL Cup, League of Ireland Cup & Northern Ireland Football League Cup)		Europe		Other		Total	
Club	Season	Division	Apps	Goals	Apps	Goals	Apps	Goals	Apps	Goals	Apps	Goals	Apps	Goals
Notts County	2018–19	EFL League Two	6	0	0	0	1	0	—		3 (Note: Appearances in EFL Trophy)	0	10	0
Dundalk	2020	League of Ireland Premier Division	7	0	2	0	—		0	0	—		9	0
Dundalk	2021	League of Ireland Premier Division	16	0	4	0	—		5 (Note: Appearances in UEFA Europa Conference League)	3	—		25	3
Dundalk	Total		23	0	6	0	—		5	3	—		34	3
Derry City (loan)	2021	League of Ireland Premier Division	16	6	—		—		—		—		16	6
Derry City	2022	League of Ireland Premier Division	33	10	3	1	—		2	0	—		38	11
Derry City	2023	League of Ireland Premier Division	29	7	2	1	—		6	2	1 (Note: Appearances in President of Ireland's Cup)	1	38	11
Derry City	2024	League of Ireland Premier Division	33	7	4	0	—		2 (Note: Appearances in the UEFA Conference League)	0	—		39	7
Derry City	Total		95	24	9	2	—		10	2	1	1	115	29
Carlisle United	2024–25	EFL League Two	10	0	—		—		—		—		10	0
Carlisle United	2025–26	National League	0	0	—		—		—		—		0	0
Carlisle United	Total		10	0	—		—		—		—		10	0
Coleraine (loan)	2025–26	NIFL Premiership	24	5	—		1	1	—		0 (Note: Appearances in North West Senior Cup)	0	25	6
Coleraine	2025–26	NIFL Premiership	12	7	4	1	0	0	—		—		16	8
Coleraine	2026–27	NIFL Premiership	14	2	0	0	0	0	2	0	0	0	16	2
Coleraine	Total		26	9	4	1	0	0	2	0	0	0	32	10
Career total			200	43	22	3	2	1	17	5	5	1	242	54
