= Tyrese (name) =

Tyrese is a given name.

== Notable people with the name include ==
- Tyrese Asante (born 2002), Dutch footballer
- Tyrese Campbell (born 1999), English footballer
- Tyrese Cooper (born 2000), American runner
- Tyrese Dyce (born 2001), English footballer
- Tyrese Fornah (born 1999), English footballer
- Tyrese Francois (born 2000), Australian footballer
- Tyrese Gibson (born 1978), American singer-songwriter
- Tyrese Haliburton (born 2000), American basketball player
- Tyrese Hunter (born 2003), American basketball player
- Tyrese Johnson-Fisher (born 1999), American football player
- Tyrese Karelse (born 2001), South African cricketer
- Tyrese Martin (born 1999), American basketball player
- Tyrese Maxey (born 2000), American basketball player
- Tyrese Omotoye (born 2002), Belgian footballer
- Tyrese Proctor (born 2004), Australian basketball player
- Tyrece Radford (born 1999), American basketball player
- Tyrese Rice (born 1987), American basketball player
- Tyrese Robinson (born 1999), American football player
- Tyrese Samuel (born 2000), American basketball player
- Tyrese Shade (born 2000), English footballer
- Tyrese Sinclair (born 2001), English footballer

== Tyrece ==
- Tyrece Radford (born 1999) , American basketball player

== Other uses ==
- Tyrese (album), Tyrese Gibson's 1998 debut album

== See also ==
- Tyreese, a fictional character from the comic book series The Walking Dead, portrayed by Chad Coleman in the American television series of the same name
- Tyreece, a given name
- Tyrece Radford (born 1999), U.S. basketball player
