= Prosodia Rationalis =

Book on English verse and linguistics

Prosodia Rationalis is the short title of the 1779 expanded second edition of Joshua Steele's An Essay Towards Establishing the Melody and Measure of Speech, to be Expressed and Perpetuated by Peculiar Symbols, originally published in 1775. In this work Steele proposes a notation for linguistic prosody. The notation is inspired by that used in music. The treatise is notable as one of the earliest works in the subject and its insight that in speech, unlike in most music, pitches slide rather than exhibit distinct tones held for lengths of time.

== Origin and structure ==
In 1774 James Burnett, Lord Monboddo published the second of 6 volumes of his On the Origin and Progress of Language containing, among much else, a section dealing with "language considered as sound". Sir John Pringle (then president of the Royal Society) asked Joshua Steele to respond to some of Monboddo's statements, particularly the statement:

That there is no accent, such as the Greek and Latin accents, in any modern language. ... We have accents in English, and syllabic accents too; but there is no change of the tone in them; the voice is only raised more, so as to be louder upon one syllable than another. ... Now I appeal to them, whether they can perceive any difference of tone betwixt the accented and unaccented syllable of any word? And if there be none, then is the music of our language, in this respect, nothing better than the music of a drum, in which we perceive no difference except that of louder or softer.

Steele's objection occupies most of the first 2 Parts of Prosodia Rationalis.

But as each section of Steele's argument was completed, he sent it off for Lord Monboddo's comments, which were then incorporated along with Steele's replies in subsequent sections of the book: "consequently, Prosodia Rationalis is, in effect, an extended dialogue between the two men, to which is appended, in the second edition, an additional series of questions from other hands, together with the author's replies."

== The five orders of accidents ==
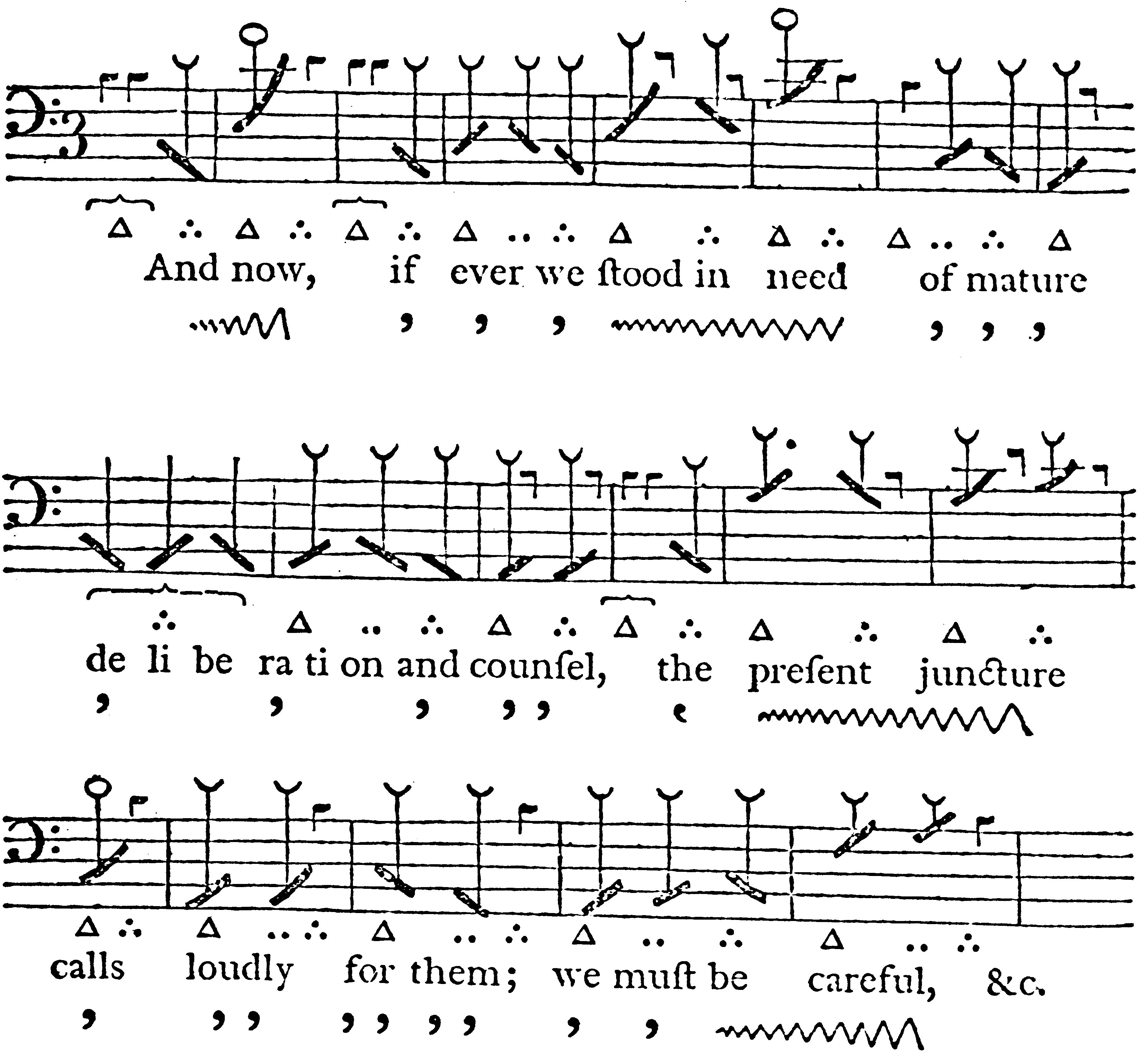
Joshua Steele's "peculiar symbols": The "notes" indicate quantity at the top and the sliding accent at the bottom; pauses are indicated by the little L-shaped marks; poize by the triangular and dotted forms; and force by both single quotes and zig-zags.

Steele proposed that the "melody and measure" of speech could be analyzed and recorded by notating five distinct types of characteristics, the "five orders of accidents". These are broadly analogous to the suprasegmentals of modern linguistics. The five orders are:

1. Accent: the pitch (melody) of the syllable, not—as in music—a fixed pitch, but rather acute (rising), grave (falling), or circumflex (both rising and falling, resulting in either a peak or dip in the middle).
2. Quantity: the duration of the syllable, regarded as semibrief (whole note), minim (half note), crotchet (quarter note), or quaver (eighth note); plus dotted (× 1.5) versions of each length.
3. Pause: silence or rest, measured by the same durations as quantity. (Steele marks his pauses with the accidents of both quantity and poize—but logically not accent or force. Therefore, pause does not exist, in his practice, on the same hierarchical level as the other accidents, functioning more like a syllable.)
4. Poize: also emphasis or cadence, "a term [emphasis] Steele uses ambivalently and confusedly to denote both the absolute duration between stresses (cadence, bar), and also the stresses themselves..." Steele notes three levels: heavy, light, lightest. "Heavy" is equivalent to the Greek thesis (essentially "downbeat"), and "light" to the Greek arsis (essentially "upbeat"), hence in his quasi-musical notation every bar begins with a heavy element; "lightest" is called into service for triple-time cadences, "minuet and jigg".
5. Force: the loudness of the syllable, marked as loud, louder, soft, or softer; Steele also occasionally marks crescendos and diminuendos over a string of syllables.
