= Declan Dunn =

English footballer

Personal information
- Date of birth: 8 October 2000 (age 26)
- Position: Centre back

Team information
- Current team: Basford United

Youth career
- 2010–2018: Notts County

Senior career*
Years	Team	Apps	(Gls)
2018–2020	Notts County	3	(0)
2019–2020	→ Grantham Town (loan)	16	(1)
2020–	Basford United	41	(1)
2022–2023	→ Grantham Town (loan)	11	(0)
- * Club domestic league appearances and goals as of 00:37, 2 May 2022 (UTC)

Declan Dunn (born 8 October 2000) is an English professional footballer who plays as a defender for Basford United.

== Playing career ==
Dunn joined the youth-team at Notts County at under-10 level. He made his senior debut for the "Magpies" on 10 November 2018, coming on as an 82nd-minute substitute for Cedric Evina in a 4–0 defeat at Barnsley in the FA Cup. He signed his first professional contract at Meadow Lane nine days later; he stated that "It's a massive weight lifted off my shoulders because it's something I've wanted for a long time and I've worked hard for it." On 16 October 2019, Dunn signed for Grantham Town on a month loan.

He joined Basford United in August 2020. In December 2022, Dunn returned to Grantham Town on loan before being recalled in March 2023.

== Statistics ==
Club	Season	League			FA Cup		EFL Cup		Other		Total	
Club	Season	Division	Apps	Goals	Apps	Goals	Apps	Goals	Apps	Goals	Apps	Goals
Notts County	2018–19	EFL League Two	0	0	1	0	0	0	0	0	1	0
Career total			0	0	1	0	0	0	0	0	1	0
