= Pierce Bird =

Northern Irish professional footballer

Personal information
- Full name: Pierce Michael Bird
- Date of birth: 16 April 1999 (age 27)
- Place of birth: Nottingham, England
- Height: 1.89 m (6 ft 2 1/2 in)
- Position: Defender

Team information
- Current team: Matlock Town

Senior career*
Years	Team	Apps	(Gls)
2016–2017	Dunkirk	3	(0)
2016–2017	AFC Dunkirk	30	(6)
2017–2020	Notts County	24	(0)
2017	→ Leek Town (loan)	3	(0)
2018	→ Alfreton Town (loan)	4	(1)
2018	→ Grantham Town (loan)	2	(0)
2019	→ Boston United (loan)	1	(0)
2020–2021	Eastleigh	29	(0)
2020–2021	→ Boston United (loan)	4	(0)
2021–2022	King's Lynn Town	13	(0)
2022	→ FC Halifax Town (loan)	5	(0)
2022–2024	AFC Fylde	40	(2)
2023	→ Buxton (loan)	3	(0)
2024	→ Eastbourne Borough (loan)	13	(1)
2024–2025	Eastbourne Borough	30	(0)
2025–2026	Kidderminster Harriers	10	(0)
2026–	Matlock Town	0	(0)

International career
2018–2019	Northern Ireland U21	3	(0)
- * Club domestic league appearances and goals as of 08:30, 1 April 2026 (UTC)

Pierce Michael Bird (born 16 April 1999) is a Northern Irish professional footballer who plays as a centre back for Northern Premier League Divison One East side Matlock Town.

== Career ==
=== Dunkirk ===
Bird played for Dunkirk of the East Midlands Counties League and also their reserve side, AFC Dunkirk of the Nottinghamshire Senior League. He made his senior debut for Dunkirk on 9 August 2016 in the 3–2 home win against Holbrook Sports. On 17 August 2016 in the away win at Cotgrave he made his debut for AFC Dunkirk.

=== Notts County ===
Bird sealed a trial at League Two side Notts County, and scored the winning goal in the pre-season win at York City, On 31 July it was announced that Bird had secured a one-year contract at Notts County after impressing during his trial period. On 7 November 2017, Bird made his Notts County debut in the EFL Trophy match at Lincoln City, scoring an own goal. On 26 December 2017, Bird made his Football League debut as an 87th-minute substitute in the 4–1 win at Morecambe.

On 29 May 2018, Bird signed a two-year contract with Notts County.

On 3 June 2020, out of contract Bird was informed he will not be offered a new contract when his current contract ends on 30 June.

==== Loan to Leek Town ====
On 9 September 2017, Bird joined Northern Premier League Division One South side Leek Town on a one-month loan, making his debut the same day in a 3–1 away win at Gresley.

==== Loan to Alfreton Town ====
On 5 January 2018, Bird joined National League North side Alfreton Town on a month youth loan. He made his debut the next day in the 3–0 win away at North Ferriby United, and also scored the third Alfreton goal.

==== Loan to Grantham Town ====
On 1 November 2018, Bird joined Northern Premier League Premier Division side Grantham Town on a one-month loan. He made his debut on 3 November in the 0–2 defeat to Warrington Town.

==== Loan to Boston United ====
On 22 November 2019, Bird joined National League North side Boston United until the end of the year. He made his debut the next day in the F.A. Trophy 0–1 defeat at Atherton Collieries, and was substituted after 32 minutes, due to a head injury. On 19 December 2019, Bird was recalled from his loan spell.

=== Eastleigh ===
On 11 August 2020, Bird joined National League side Eastleigh. Bird made his debut as a 105th-minute substitute in the F.A. Cup 1st Round defeat to Milton Keynes Dons on 8 November 2020. Bird scored in the penalty shoot-out where Eastleigh lost 4–3.

On 28 June 2021, Eastleigh confirmed that Bird will leave the club following the expiry of his contract, after turning down a new deal.

==== Loan to Boston United ====
On 18 December 2020, Bird joined National League North side Boston United, until 16 January 2021. He made his debut the next day in the F.A. Trophy win against AFC Fylde.

=== King's Lynn Town ===
On 29 June 2021, Bird joined National League side King's Lynn Town. He made his debut on 21 August 2021 in the National League home defeat against Southend United.

==== Loan to FC Halifax Town ====
On 25 March 2022, Bird joined fellow National League side FC Halifax Town on loan for the remainder of the 2021–22 season. He made his debut on 9 April 2022 as an 87th-minute substitute in the National League home win against Woking.

=== AFC Fylde ===
On 24 June 2022, Bird joined National League North side AFC Fylde for an undisclosed fee. He made his debut on 6 August 2022 in the National League North home victory against Kettering Town.

Bird was released by AFC Fylde at the end of the 2023–24 season.

==== Loan to Buxton ====
On 21 November 2023, Bird joined National League North club Buxton on a one-month loan deal. He made his debut the same day in the home victory against Hereford.

==== Loan to Eastbourne Borough ====
On 26 January 2024, Bird joined National League South club Eastbourne Borough on a one-month loan deal. He made his debut the next day in the home victory over Farnborough. On 23 February 2024, Eastbourne announced Bird had extended his loan spell until the end of the season.

=== Eastbourne Borough ===
On 15 May 2024, it was announced that Bird would join Eastbourne Borough on a permanent transfer ahead of the 2024–2025 season.

=== Kidderminster Harriers ===
On 29 May 2025, Bird joined National League North side Kidderminster Harriers, reuniting with new manager Adam Murray whom Bird had played under at both AFC Fylde and Eastbourne Borough. He made his debut on 19 August 2025 in the National League North home draw against Oxford City. On 8 October 2025, Kidderminster announced Bird would miss the next four or five months after undergoing knee surgery. On 1 June 2026, Kidderminster announced their retained list, with Bird leaving at the expiration of his contract.

=== Matlock Town ===
On 7 June 2026 it was announced Bird had signed for Northern Premier League Divison One East side Matlock Town ahead of the 2026–27 season.

== International career ==
On 30 August 2018, Bird received a call-up for the Northern Ireland under-21 squad for upcoming games against Luxembourg and Spain. Bird is eligible to represent Northern Ireland at international level through his grandparents.

On 6 September 2018, in the friendly against Luxembourg under-21 he made his debut in a 1–0 win. Bird was substituted in the 70th minute.

He made his competitive debut on 11 September 2018 as a 78th-minute substitute in Northern Ireland under-21s 2–1 victory away to Spain under-21 in the 2019 UEFA European Under-21 Championship qualifying competition.

== Career statistics ==
As of match played 1 April 2026

Appearances and goals by club, season and competition
Club	Season	League			FA Cup		League Cup		Other		Total	
Club	Season	Division	Apps	Goals	Apps	Goals	Apps	Goals	Apps	Goals	Apps	Goals
Dunkirk	2016–17	East Midlands Counties League	3	0	0	0	0	0	0	0	3	0
AFC Dunkirk	2016–17	Notts Senior League Premier Division	30	6	0	0	0	0	5 (Note: Appearance(s) in Notts F.A. Intermediate Cup)	1	35	7
Notts County	2017–18	League Two	1	0	0	0	0	0	1 (Note: Appearance(s) in EFL Trophy)	0	2	0
Notts County	2018–19	League Two	12	0	0	0	1	0	0	0	13	0
Notts County	2019–20	National League	11	0	0	0	0	0	0	0	11	0
Notts County	Total		24	0	0	0	1	0	1	0	26	0
Leek Town (loan)	2017–18	Northern Premier League Division One South	3	0	0	0	0	0	0	0	3	0
Alfreton Town (loan)	2017–18	National League North	4	1	—		—		—		4	1
Grantham Town (loan)	2018–19	Northern Premier League Premier Division	2	0	—		—		—		2	0
Boston United (loan)	2019–20	National League North	1	0	2	0	—		1 (Note: Appearance(s) in FA Trophy)	0	4	0
Eastleigh	2020–21	National League	29	0	1	0	—		0	0	30	0
Boston United (loan)	2020–21	National League North	4	0	0	0	—		1	0	5	0
King's Lynn Town	2021–22	National League	13	0	1	0	—		2	0	16	0
FC Halifax Town (loan)	2021–22	National League	5	0	0	0	—		0	0	5	0
AFC Fylde	2022–23	National League North	35	2	6	0	—		2	0	43	2
AFC Fylde	2023–24	National League	5	0	0	0	—		0	0	5	0
Buxton (loan)	2023–24	National League North	3	0	0	0	—		0	0	3	0
Eastbourne Borough (loan)	2023–24	National League South	13	1	0	0	—		0	0	13	1
Eastbourne Borough	2024–25	National League South	30	0	0	0	—		4 (Note: One appearance in FA Trophy, three appearances in Sussex Senior Cup)	0	34	0
Kidderminster Harriers	2025–26	National League North	10	0	1	0	—		0	0	11	0
Matlock Town	2026–27	Northern Premier League Division One North	0	0	0	0	—		0	0	0	0
Career total			214	11	10	0	1	0	16	1	242	11

== Honours ==
AFC Dunkirk

- 2016–17 Nottinghamshire F.A. Intermediate Cup Winners

AFC Fylde

- 2022–23 National League North Champions

Kidderminster Harriers

- 2025–26 National League North Play-off Winners
