= Elizabeth Burnett =

Scottish woman (1766–1790)

Elizabeth Burnett (1766 – 17 June 1790) was the younger daughter of the Scottish judge and philosopher James Burnett, Lord Monboddo, and a famous Edinburgh beauty of the late 18th century.

She is remembered as the young woman who is celebrated by the Scottish poet Robert Burns in his "Address to Edinburgh" (1786) and his "Elegy on The Late Miss Burnet of Monboddo" (1791), which Burns wrote after her early death from consumption (tuberculosis) at the age of 24.

The National Gallery of Scotland includes a drawing of Miss Elizabeth Burnett.

== Life ==
Burnett was probably born at the family seat of Monboddo House in Kincardineshire. Her mother, also named Elizabeth or Elizabethe (born Farquharson), died soon after giving birth to her. She is said to have met the poet Burns in the foyer of Edinburgh's Canongate Theatre and to have cemented their relationship at another meeting in Aberdeen. In 1786, Burns wrote in his poem "Address to Edinburgh" that "Dear as th' raptur'd thrill of joy; / Fair B––– strikes th' adoring eye". When the poem was reprinted, Burns added in a footnote: "Fair B. is heavenly Miss Burnet, daughter to Lord Monboddo, at whose house I have had the honour to be more than once. There has not been anything nearly like her in all the combinations of beauty, grace, and goodness the great Creator has formed since Milton's Eve on the first day of her existence."

However, it is said that Elizabeth became seriously ill after learning of the poet's infidelity with another woman (although she must already have been suffering from the then incurable disease tuberculosis). Burns wrote in his "Elegy on The Late Miss Burnet of Monboddo" in 1791:

Life ne'er exulted in so rich a prize,
As Burnet, lovely from her native skies;
Nor envious death so triumph'd in a blow,
As that which laid th' accomplish'd Burnet low.

Thy form and mind, sweet maid, can I forget?
In richest ore the brightest jewel set!
In thee, high Heaven above was truest shown,
As by His noblest work the Godhead best is known.

Elizabeth is buried, along with her father, whom she pre-deceased by almost a decade, in Greyfriars Kirkyard near Edinburgh Castle where they both have unmarked graves in the burial enclosure of Patrick Grant of Elchies. A portrait engraving of a young woman who is believed to be Elizabeth, dated 1814, is preserved at the Robert Burns Birthplace Museum at Alloway in Ayr. The present clan chief of the Burnetts of Leys, James Burnett of Crathes Castle in Aberdeenshire, believes that there may exist a lost painting of her.
