= Remaye Campbell =

English footballer (born 2000)

Personal information
- Full name: Remaye Orvil Kelvin Campbell
- Date of birth: 7 July 2000 (age 26)
- Place of birth: Nottingham, England
- Height: 1.85 m (6 ft 1 in)
- Position: Forward

Team information
- Current team: Dagenham & Redbridge

Youth career
- –2018: Notts County

Senior career*
Years	Team	Apps	(Gls)
2018–2020	Notts County	1	(0)
2018	→ Grantham Town (loan)	1	(0)
2019–2020	→ Grantham Town (loan)	19	(1)
2020–2021	Grantham Town	5	(0)
2021–2023	Ilkeston Town	74	(34)
2023–2024	Basford United	38	(9)
2024	Kettering Town	6	(0)
2024–2025	Matlock Town	21	(6)
2025–2026	Hereford	32	(9)
2026	Hemel Hempstead Town	27	(10)
2026–	Dagenham & Redbridge	8	(1)
- * Club domestic league appearances and goals as of 20:18, 21 November 2026 (UTC)

Remaye Orvil Kelvin Campbell (born 7 July 2000) is an English professional footballer who plays as a forward for National League South club Dagenham & Redbridge.

== Career ==
Campbell came through the Notts County Academy, eventually starring for the under-18 team and leading the league in scoring before "graduating" in 2018. He made his debut with the first team on 14 August 2018, coming on for Andy Kellett in the second half of a League Cup match against Middlesbrough. On 3 November 2018, Campbell went on a one-month loan at Grantham Town.

On 8 October 2019, he re-joined Grantham Town on loan for the remainder of the season.

He joined Grantham for a third time, this time permanently, in August 2020 after his release by Notts County.

He signed for Northern Premier League Division One Midlands side Ilkeston Town on a free transfer in August 2021.

After scoring 30 goals while with Ilkeston, Campbell signed with Basford United in July 2023.

After one season with Basford, in July 2024, Campbell joined Southern League Premier Division Central club Kettering Town. He made seven appearances for The Poppies without scoring, before joining Northern Premier League Premier Division club Matlock Town for an undisclosed fee in September 2024.

On 13 February 2025, Campbell stepped up a level to join National League North club Hereford on a deal until the end of the 2024–25 season. He scored on his debut in a 2–0 league win away against King's Lynn Town. He also scored on his home debut in a 3–2 league win against Warrington Town. He finished the season with six goals in 15 appearances, and signed a new deal at the club for the 2025–26 season on 4 June 2025. On 30 January 2026, he signed for National League South club Hemel Hempstead Town for an undisclosed fee. He left the club on 15 September 2026.

== Career statistics ==
As of match played 21 November 2026

Appearances and goals by club, season and competition
Club	Season	League			FA Cup		League Cup		Other		Total	
Club	Season	Division	Apps	Goals	Apps	Goals	Apps	Goals	Apps	Goals	Apps	Goals
Notts County	2018–19	League Two	0	0	0	0	1	0	1 (Note: Appearance in EFL Trophy)	0	2	0
Notts County	2019–20	National League	1	0	0	0	—		0	0	1	0
Notts County	Total		1	0	0	0	1	0	1	0	3	0
Grantham Town (loan)	2019–20	NPL Premier Division	19	1	—		—		4 (Note: Two appearances, one goal in FA Trophy; one appearance, one goal in Lincolnshire Senior Cup; one appearance in Northern Premier League Challenge Cup)	2	23	3
Grantham Town	2020–21	NPL Premier Division	5	0	2	0	—		2 (Note: Appearances in FA Trophy)	1	9	1
Ilkeston Town	2021–22	NPL Division One Midlands	36	20	2	0	—		2	0	40	20
Ilkeston Town	2022–23	SFL Premier Division Central	38	14	3	3	—		2 (Note: One appearance in FA Trophy; one appearance in Derbyshire Senior Cup)	0	43	17
Ilkeston Town	Total		74	34	5	3	—		4	0	83	37
Basford United	2023–24	NPL Premier Division	38	9	1	0	—		3 (Note: One appearance in FA Trophy; two appearances, two goals in Derbyshire Senior Cup)	2	42	11
Kettering Town	2024–25	SFL Premier Division Central	6	0	1	0	—		—		7	0
Matlock Town	2024–25	NPL Premier Division	21	6	—		—		2 (Note: One appearance in FA Trophy; one appearance, one goal in Derbyshire Senior Cup)	1	23	7
Hereford	2024–25	National League North	15	6	—		—		—		15	6
Hereford	2025–26	National League North	17	3	3	2	—		2	0	22	5
Hereford	Total		32	9	3	2	—		2	0	37	11
Hemel Hempstead Town	2025–26	National League South	18	7	—		—		1 (Note: Appearance in National League South play-offs)	0	19	7
Hemel Hempstead Town	2026–27	National League South	9	3	0	0	—		0	0	9	3
Hemel Hempstead Town	Total		27	10	0	0	—		1	0	28	10
Dagenham & Redbridge	2026–27	National League South	8	1	0	0	—		0	0	8	1
Career total			231	70	12	5	1	0	17	6	259	81
