= James Burnett, Lord Monboddo =

Scottish judge and scholar (1714–1799)

Lord Monboddo
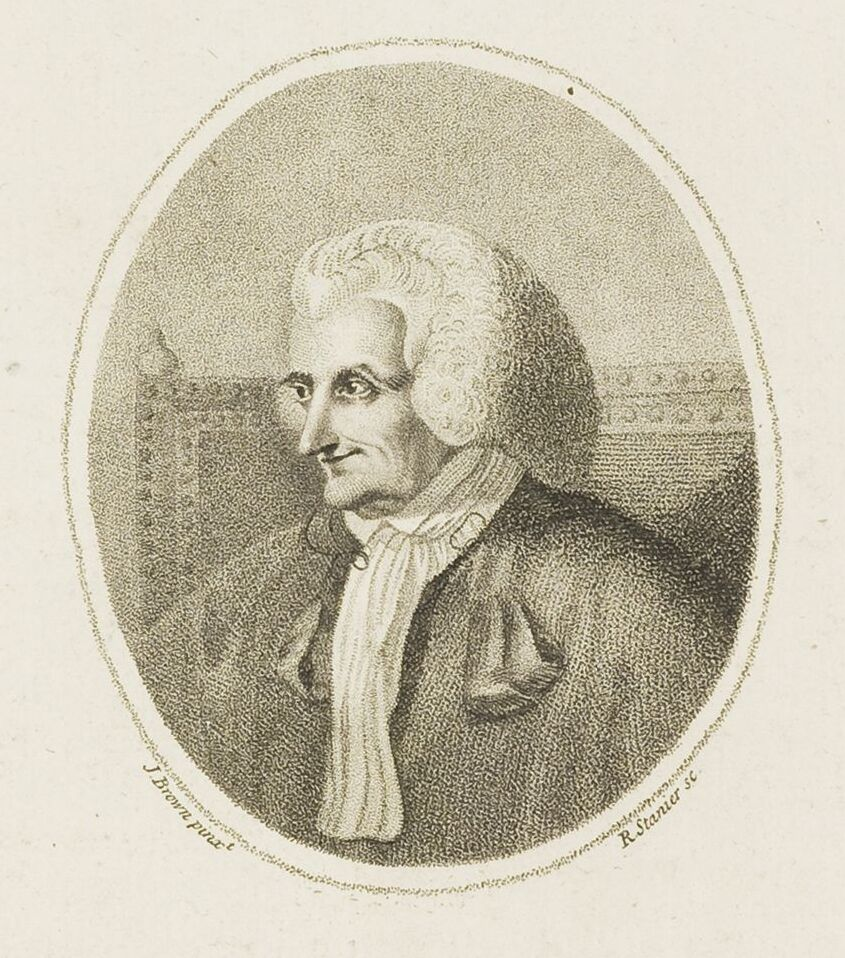
- Engraving of Lord Monboddo (after John Brown)
- Born: bapt. 25 October 1714; Monboddo House, Kincardineshire, Scotland
- Died: 26 May 1799 (aged 84); Edinburgh, Scotland
- Education: Marischal College, University of Aberdeen; University of Edinburgh
- Occupations: Philosopher, linguist, judge

James Burnett, Lord Monboddo (baptised 25 October 1714 – 26 May 1799) was a Scottish judge, scholar of linguistic evolution, philosopher and deist. He is most famous today as a founder of modern comparative historical linguistics. In 1767, he became a judge in the Court of Session.

As such, Burnett adopted an honorary title based on the name of his father's estate and family seat, Monboddo House. Monboddo was one of a number of scholars involved at the time in development of early concepts of biological evolution. Some credit him with anticipating in principle the idea of natural selection that was read by (and acknowledged in the writings of) Erasmus Darwin. Charles Darwin read the works of his grandfather Erasmus and later developed the ideas into a scientific theory.

== Early years ==
James Burnett was born in 1714 at Monboddo House in Kincardineshire, Scotland. After his primary education at the parish school of Laurencekirk, he studied at Marischal College, Aberdeen, from where he was graduated in 1729. He then studied Civil Law at the University of Groningen for three years. He returned to Scotland to stay in Edinburgh in 1736 on the day of the Porteous Riots and got caught in the crowds, witnessing the lynching of Captain John Porteous on his first night in the city. He took examination in Civil Law at Edinburgh University in 1737 and was admitted to the Faculty of Advocates.

Burnett married Elizabethe Farquharson and they had two daughters and a son. The younger daughter Elizabeth Burnett was an Edinburgh celebrity, known for her beauty and amiability, but who died of consumption (tuberculosis) at the age of 24. Burnett's friend the Scottish poet Robert Burns, had a romantic interest in Elizabeth and wrote a poem, "Elegy on The Late Miss Burnet of Monboddo", praising her beauty, which became her elegy.

Monboddo's early work in practising law found him in a landmark piece of litigation of his time, known as the Douglas "cause," or case. The matter involved the inheritance standing of a young heir, Archibald James Edward Douglas, 1st Baron Douglas, and took on the form of a mystery novel of the era, with a complex web of events spanning Scotland, France and England. Burnett, as the solicitor for the young Douglas heir, was victorious after years of legal battle and appeals.

== Later years ==
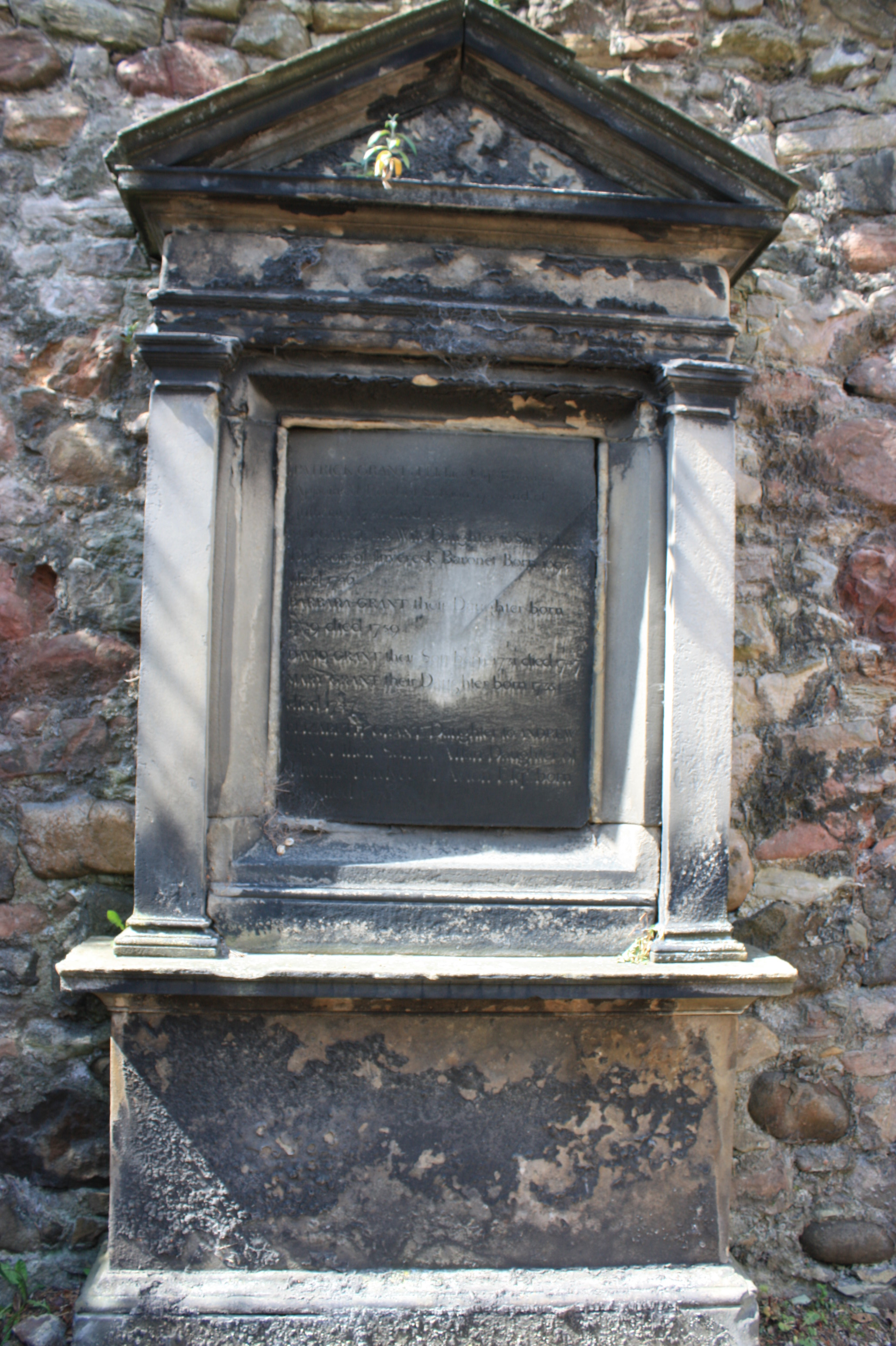
The grave of Lord Patrick Grant, Greyfriars Kirkyard – containing Lord Monboddo

From 1754 until 1767 Monboddo was one of a number of distinguished proprietors of the Canongate Theatre. He clearly enjoyed this endeavour even when some of his fellow judges pointed out that the activity might cast a shadow over his sombre image as jurist. Here he had occasion to further associate with David Hume who was a principal actor in one of the plays. He had actually met Hume earlier when Monboddo was a curator of the Advocates Library and David Hume served as keeper of that library for several years while he wrote his history.

From 1769 until 1775 John Hunter acted as his personal secretary.

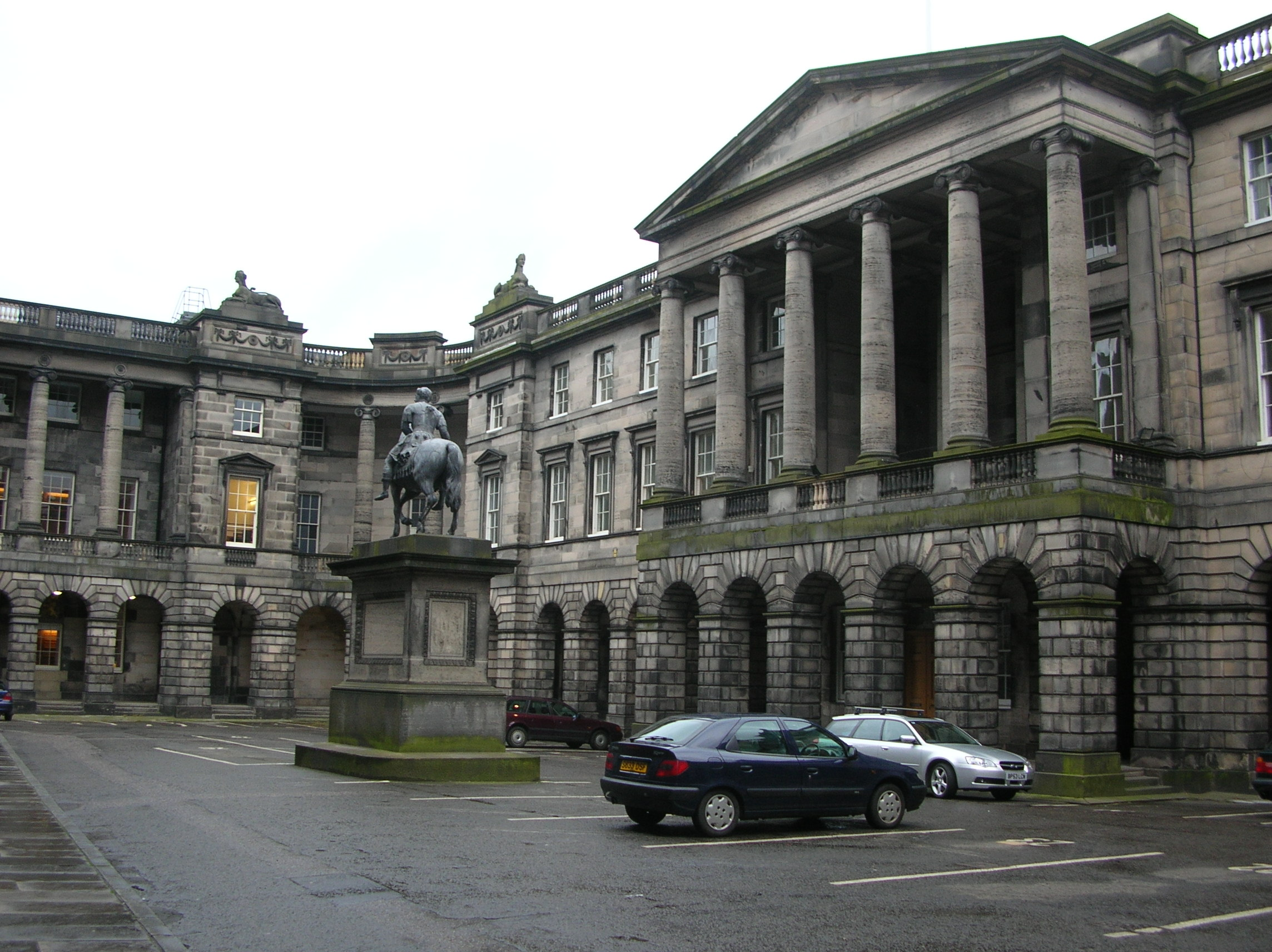
The old Parliament House, housing the Court of Session

In the era after Monboddo was appointed to Justice of the high court, he organised "learned suppers" at his house on 13 St John Street, off the Canongate in Edinburgh's Old Town, where he discussed and lectured about his theories. Local intellectuals were invited to attend attic repasts. Henry Home, Lord Kames was conspicuously absent from such socialising; while Kames and Monboddo served on the high court at the same time and had numerous interactions, they were staunch intellectual rivals. Monboddo rode to London on horseback each year and visited Hampton Court as well as other intellectuals of the era; the King himself was fond of Monboddo's colourful discussions.

Monboddo died at home 13 St John Street in the Canongate district of Edinburgh on 26 May 1799 and is buried in Greyfriars Kirkyard in Edinburgh along with his daughter Elizabeth where they have unmarked graves in the burial enclosure of Patrick Grant, Lord Elchies (within the non-public section known as the Covenanters Prison).

== Historical linguistics ==
In The Origin and Progress of Language, originally published in six volumes from 1774 to 1792, Burnett analysed the structure of languages and argued that humans had evolved language skills in response to changing environments and social structures. Burnett was the first to note that some languages create lengthy words for rather simple concepts. He reasoned that in early languages there was an imperative for clarity so redundancy was built in and seemingly unnecessary syllables added. He concluded that this form of language evolved when clear communication might be the determinant of avoiding danger.

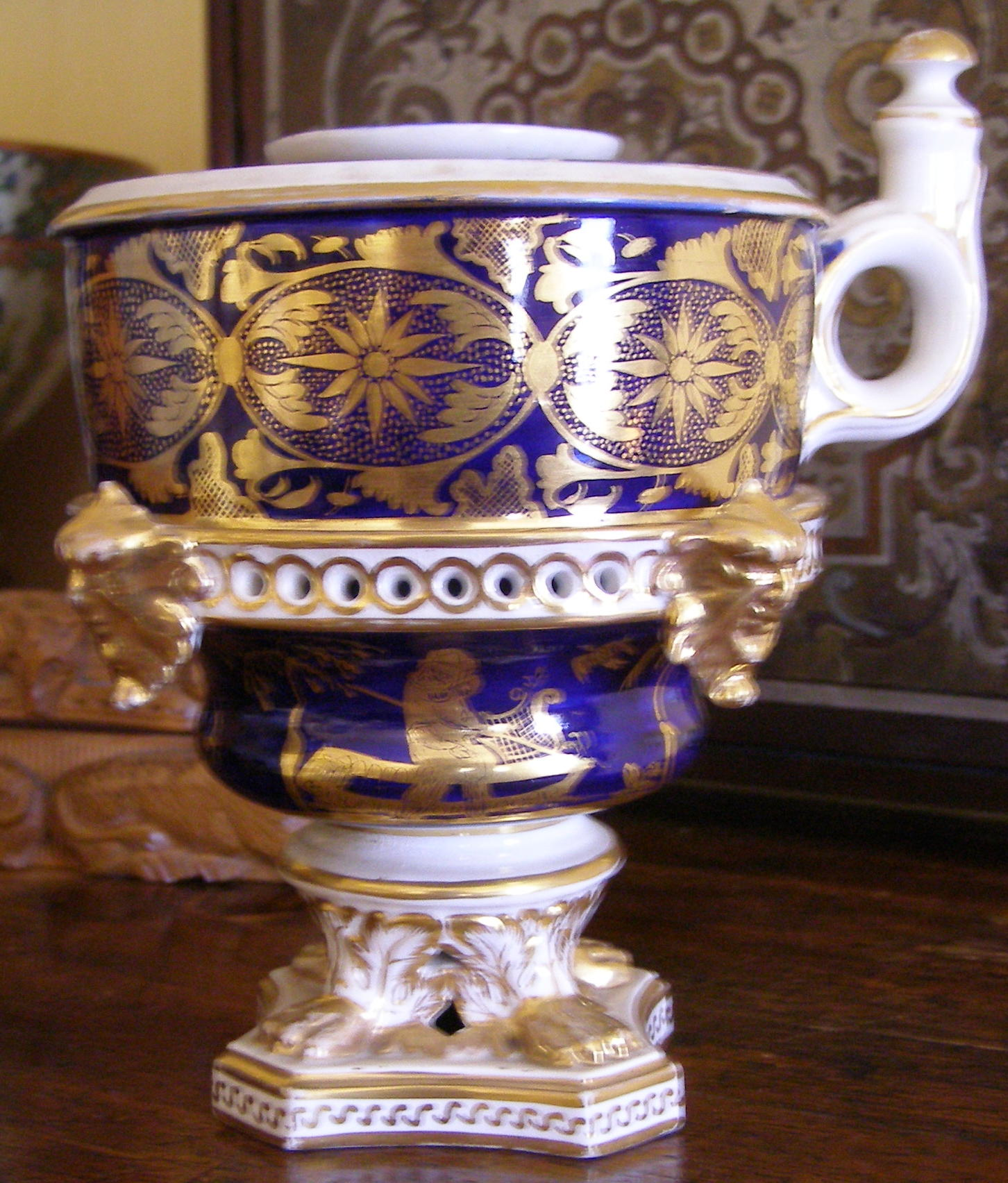
Lord Monboddo's inkwell from c. 1760

Monboddo studied languages of peoples colonised by Europeans, including those of the Carib, Eskimo, Huron, Algonquian, Peruvian (Quechua?) and Tahitian peoples. He saw the preponderance of polysyllabic words, whereas some of his predecessors had dismissed these languages as a series of monosyllabic grunts. He also observed that in Huron (or Wyandot) the words for very similar objects are astoundingly different. This fact led Monboddo to perceive that these people needed to communicate reliably regarding a more limited number of subjects than in modern civilisations, which led to the polysyllabic and redundant nature of many words. He also came up with the idea that these languages are generally vowel-rich and that correspondingly, languages such as German and English are vowel-starved. According to Burnett, this disparity partially arises from the greater vocabulary of Northern European languages and the decreased need for polysyllabic content.

Monboddo also popularized Marcus Zuerius van Boxhorn's 17th-century theory of a "Skythian" proto-language, traced the evolution of modern European languages and gave particularly great effort to understanding the ancient Greek language, in which he was proficient. He argued that Greek is the most perfect language ever established because of its complex structure and tonality, rendering it capable of expressing a wide gamut of nuances. Monboddo was the first to formulate what is now known as the single-origin hypothesis, the theory that all human origin was from a single region of the earth; he reached this conclusion by reasoning from linguistic evolution (Jones, 1789). This theory is evidence of his thinking on the topic of the evolution of Man.

Joshua Steele's disagreement, and subsequent correspondence, with Monboddo over details of the "melody and measure of speech" resulted in Steele's Prosodia Rationalis, a foundational work both in phonetics and in the analysis of verse rhythm.

== Evolutionary theorist ==
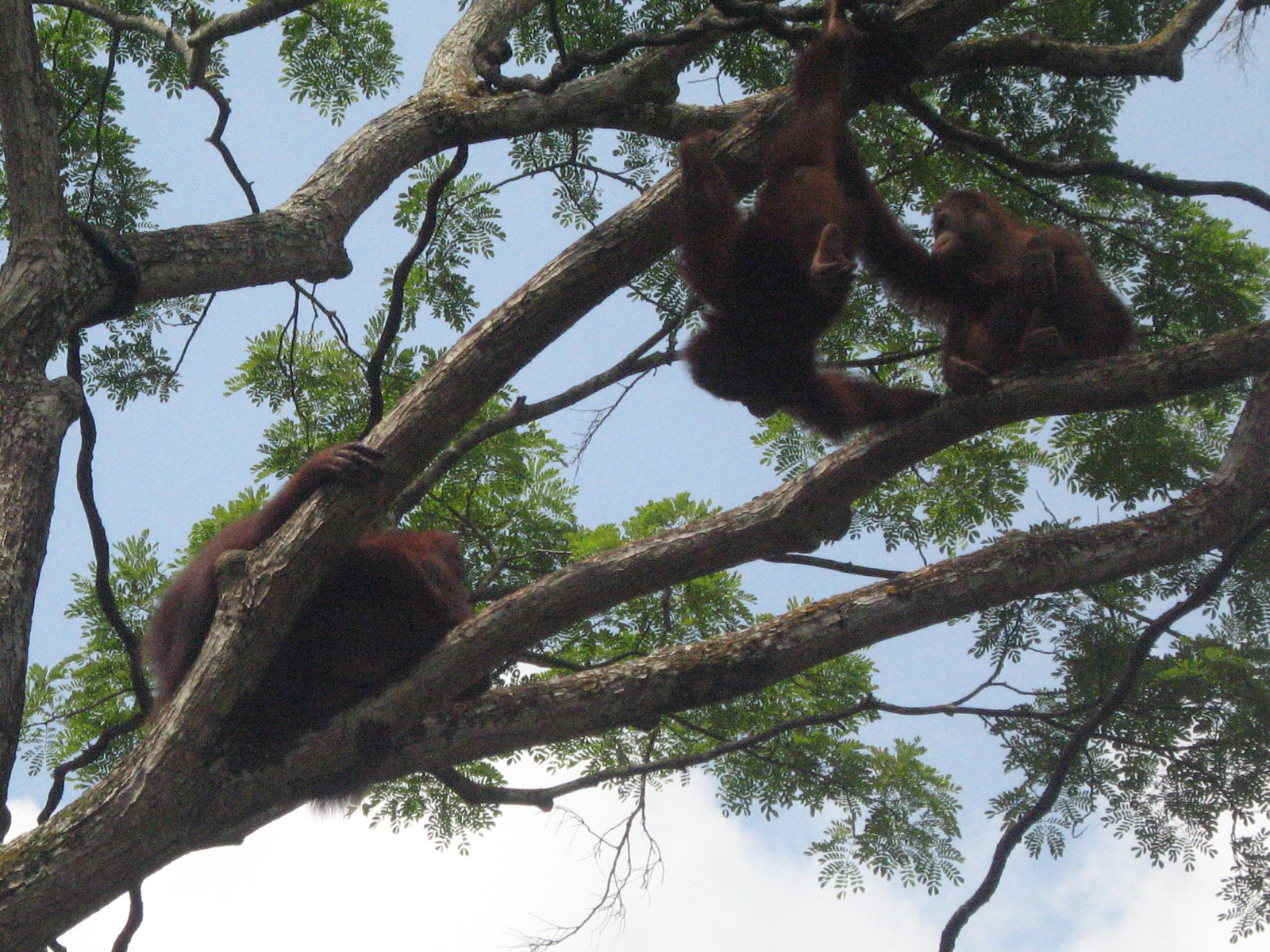
Monboddo analysed man's relation to other species.

Monboddo is considered by some scholars as a precursive thinker in the theory of evolution. However, some modern evolutionary historians do not give Monboddo an equally high standing in the influence of history of evolutionary thought.

"Monboddo: Scottish jurist and pioneer anthropologist who explored the origins of language and society and anticipated principles of Darwinian evolution."

"With some wavering, he extended Rousseau's doctrine of the identity of species of man and the chimp into the hypothesis of common descent of all the anthropoids, and suggested by implication a general law of evolution." Lovejoy.

Charles Neaves, one of Monboddo's successors on the high court of Scotland, believed that proper credit was not given to Monboddo in evolutionary theory development. Neaves wrote in verse:

Though Darwin now proclaims the law
And spreads it far abroad, O!
The man that first the secret saw
Was honest old Monboddo.
The architect precedence takes
Of him that bears the hod, O!
So up and at them, Land of Cakes,
We'll vindicate Monboddo.

Erasmus Darwin notes Monboddo's work in his publications (Darwin 1803). Later writers consider Monboddo's analysis as precursive to the theory of Evolution. Whether Charles Darwin read Monboddo is not certain. Monboddo debated with Buffon regarding man's relationship to other primates. Charles Darwin did not mention Monboddo, but commented on Buffon: "the first author who in modern times has treated [evolution] in a scientific spirit was Buffon". Buffon thought that man was a species unrelated to lower primates, but Monboddo rejected Buffon's analysis and argued that the anthropoidal ape must be related to the species of man: he sometimes referred to the anthropoidal ape as the "brother of man". Monboddo suffered a setback, in his standing on evolutionary thought, because he stated at one time that men had caudal appendages (tails); some historians failed to take him very seriously after that remark, even though Monboddo was known to bait his critics with preposterous sayings.

Bailey's The Holly and the Horn states that "Charles Darwin was to some degree influenced by the theories of Monboddo, who deserves the title of Evolutionist more than that of Eccentric." Henderson says:

"He [Monboddo] was a minor celebrity in Edinburgh because he was considered to be very eccentric. But he actually came up with the idea that men may have evolved instead of being created by God. His views were dismissed because people thought he was mad, and in those days it was a very controversial view to hold. But he felt it was a logical possibility and it caused him a great deal of consternation. He actually did not want to believe the theory because he was a very religious person."

Monboddo may be the first person to associate language skills evolving from primates and continuing to evolve in early humans (Monboddo, 1773). He wrote about how the language capability has altered over time in the form not only of skills but physical form of the sound producing organs (mouth, vocal cords, tongue, throat), suggesting he had formed the concept of evolutionary adaptive change.

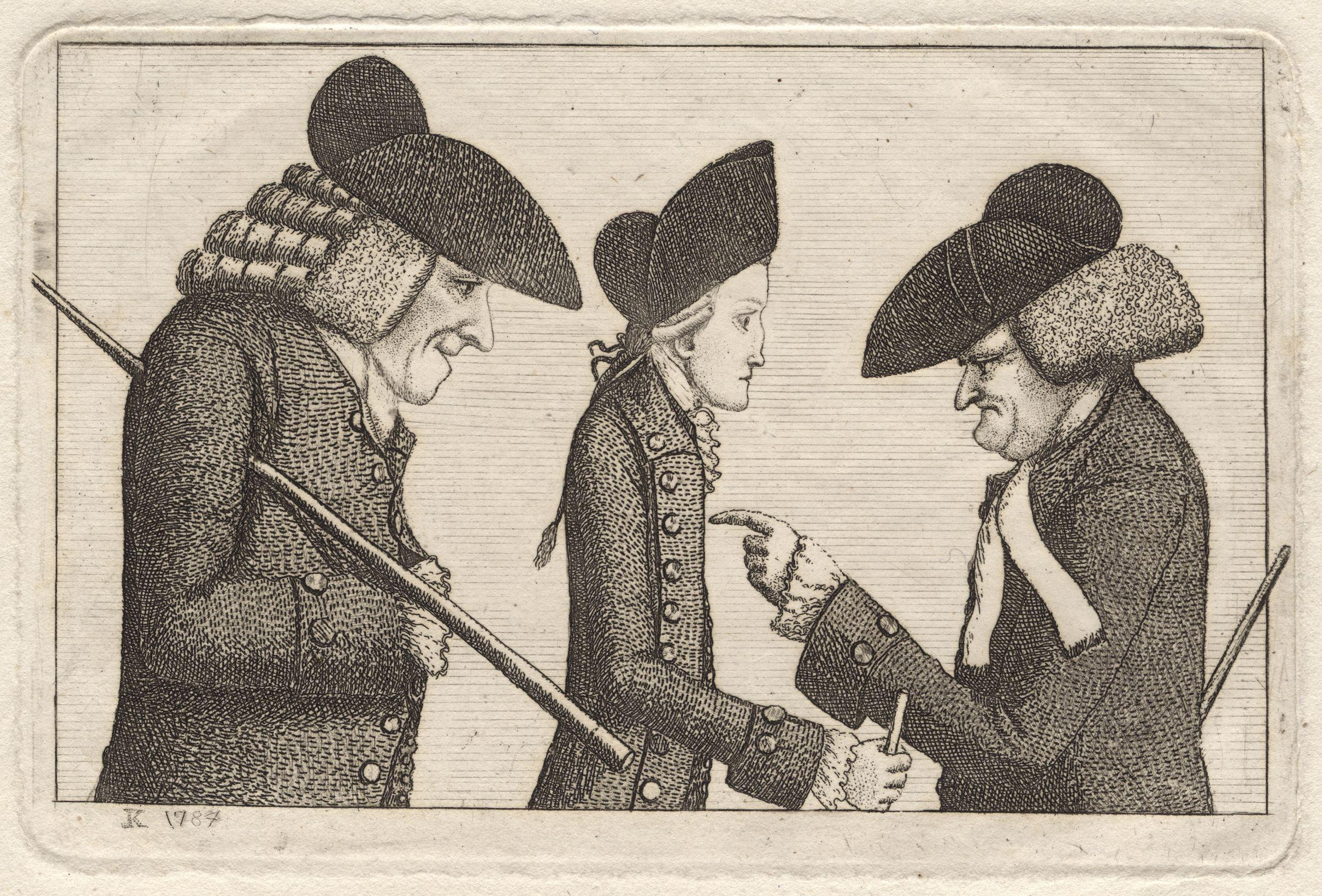
Left to right: Lord Kames, Hugo Arnot and Lord Monboddo, by John Kay

He also elaborates on the advantages created by the adaptive change of primates to their environment and even to the evolving complexity of primate social structures. In 1772 in a letter to James Harris, Monboddo articulated that his theory of language evolution (Harris 1772) was simply a part of the manner that man had advanced from the lower animals, a clear precedent of evolutionary thought. Furthermore, he established a detailed theory of how man adaptively acquired language to cope better with his environment and social needs. He argued that the development of language was linked to a procession of events: first developing use of tools, then social structures and finally language. This concept was quite striking for his era, because it departed from the classical religious thinking that man was created instantaneously and language revealed by God. In fact, Monboddo was deeply religious and pointed out that the creation events were probably simply allegories and did not dispute that the universe was created by God. Monboddo was a vigorous opponent of other scientific thinking that philosophically questioned the role of God (see Monboddo's prolific diatribes on Newton's theories).

As an agriculturist and horse-breeder, Monboddo was quite aware of the significance of selective breeding and even transferred this breeding theory to communications he had with James Boswell in Boswell's selection of a mate. Monboddo has stated in his own works that degenerative qualities can be inherited by successive generations and that by selective choice of mates, creatures can improve the next generation in a biological sense. This suggests that Monboddo understood the role of natural processes in evolution; artificial selection was the starting-point for many of the proto-evolutionary thinkers, and for Darwin himself.

Monboddo struggled with how to "get man from an animal" without divine intervention. This is typical of the kind of thinking which is called deist. He developed an entire theory of language evolution around the Egyptian civilisation to assist in his understanding of how man descended from animals, since he explained the flowering of language upon the spinoff of the Egyptians imparting language skills to other cultures. Monboddo cast early humans as wild, solitary, herbivorous quadrupeds. He believed that contemporary people suffered many diseases because they were removed from the environmental state of being unclothed and exposed to extreme swings in climate.

Burnett wrote of numerous cultures (mostly based upon accounts of explorers); for example, he described "insensibles" and "wood eaters" in Of the Origin and Progress of Language. He was fascinated by the nature of these peoples' language development and also how they fit into the evolutionary scheme.

Against all this, Monboddo's contribution to evolution is today regarded by historians of evolution as being notable.

Bowler acknowledges his argument that apes might represent the earliest form of humanity (Monboddo 1774), but continues:

"He [Monboddo] regarded humans (including savages and apes) as quite distinct from the rest of the animal kingdom. The first suggestion that the human species was descended via the apes from the lower animals did not come until Lamarck's Philosophie Zoologique of 1809."

Charles Dickens knew of Monboddo and wrote in his novel, Life and Adventures of Martin Chuzzlewit about "(...) the Manboddo doctrine touching the probability of the human race having once been monkeys". This is significant because Martin Chuzzlewit was published (1843) years before Darwin's On the Origin of Species (1859).

The history of the theory of evolution is a relatively modern field of scholarship.

== Metaphysics ==
In Antient Metaphysics, Burnett claimed that man is gradually elevating himself from the animal condition to a state in which mind acts independently of the body. He was a strong supporter of Aristotle in his concepts of Prime Mover. Much effort was devoted to crediting Isaac Newton with brilliant discoveries in the Laws of Motion, while defending the power of the mind as outlined by Aristotle. His analysis was further complicated by his recurring need to assure that Newton did not obviate the presence of God.

== Nudism ==
Monboddo was a pioneer in regard to many modern ideas and had already in the eighteenth century realized the value of "air-baths" (the familiar term which he invented) to mental and physical health. In his writings, Monboddo argued against clothes as unnatural and undesirable from every point of view for both mind and body. Monboddo "awaked every morning at four, and then for his health got up and walked in his room naked, with the window open, which he called taking an air bath." When nudism was first brought into fashion with much enthusiasm in Germany as Freikörperkultur early in the twentieth century Monboddo was regarded as a pioneer, and in 1913 a Monboddo Bund was established in Berlin, for the harmonious culture of body and mind.

== Eccentricity ==
Burnett was widely known to be an eccentric. Habitually he rode on horseback between Edinburgh and London instead of journeying by carriage. Another time after a decision went against him regarding the value of a horse, he refused to sit with the other judges and assumed a seat below the bench with the court clerks. When Burnett was visiting the Court of King's Bench in London in 1787, part of the floor of the courtroom started to collapse. People rushed out of the building but Burnett who, at the age of 71, was partially deaf and shortsighted, was the only one not to move. When he was later asked for a reason, he stated that he thought it was "an annual ceremony, with which, as an alien, he had nothing to do".

Burnett in his earlier years suggested that the orangutan was a form of man, although some analysts think that some of his presentation was designed to entice his critics into debate.

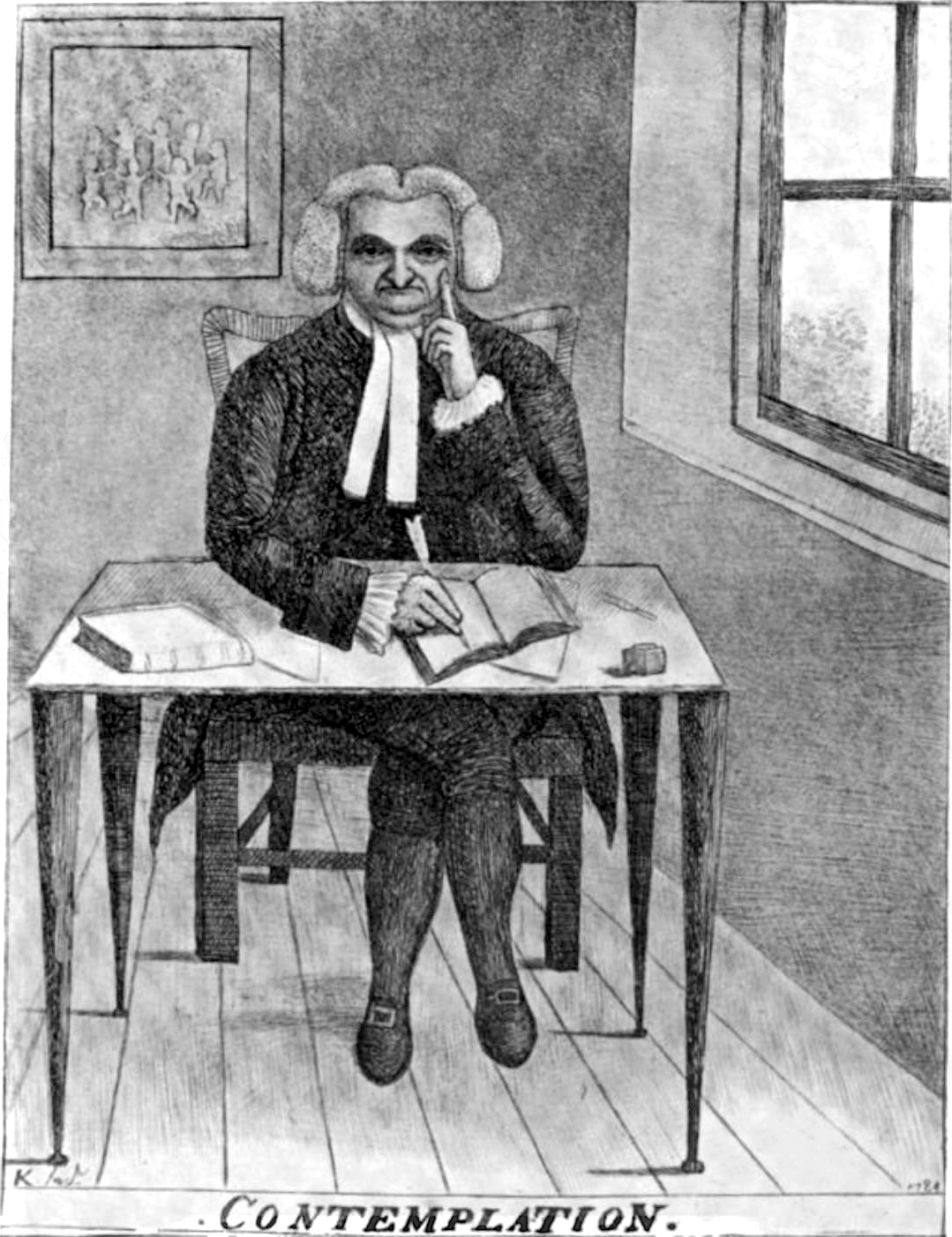
Lord Monboddo, a caricature by John Kay

The orangutan was at this time a generic term for all types of apes. The Swedish explorer whose evidence Burnett accepted was a naval officer who had viewed a group of monkeys and thought they were human. Burnett may simply have taken the view that it was reasonable for people to assume the things they do and the word of a naval officer trained to give accurate reports was a credible source. Burnett was indeed responsible for changing the classical definition of man as a creature of reason to a creature capable of achieving reason, although he viewed this process as one slow and difficult to achieve.

At one time he said that humans must have all been born with tails, which were removed by midwives at birth. His contemporaries ridiculed his views, and by 1773 he had retracted this opinion (Pringle 1773). Some later commentators have seen him as anticipating evolutionary theory. He appeared to argue that animal species adapted and changed to survive, and his observations on the progression of primates to man amounted to some kind of concept of evolution. Burnett also examined feral children and was the only thinker of his day to accept them as human rather than monsters. He viewed in these children the ability to achieve reason. He identified the orangutan as human, as his sources indicated it was capable of experiencing shame.

== In popular culture ==
In Thomas Love Peacock's 1817 novel Melincourt, an orangutan punningly named "Sir Oran Haut-Ton" becomes a candidate for British Parliament based on Monboddo's theories.

Charles Dickens, in his novel Martin Chuzzlewit, refers to "the Manboddo doctrine touching the probability of the human race having once been monkeys".

In his 1981 dystopian novel Lanark, Alasdair Gray names the head of the mysterious Institute Lord Monboddo. He makes the connection explicit in a marginal note, adding that it is not a literal depiction.

Lord Monboddo's descendant, Jamie Burnett of Leys, has sponsored a stage work Monboddo – The Musical which is a biographical re-enactment of the life of his ancestor. It received a first run at Aberdeen Arts Centre in September 2010.

In her short story "The Monboddo Ape Boy", Lillian de la Torre depicted a slightly fictionalised Monboddo meeting Samuel Johnson, and being presented with a supposed "wild boy".

== Writings ==
=== Publications ===
- Preface to de La Condamine, Charles Marie; Le Blanc, Marie-Angélique Memmie (1768). An Account of a Savage Girl, Caught Wild in the Woods of Champagne. Translated from the French of Madam H–––t'. Translated by William Robertson. Edinburgh: A. Kincaid and J. Bell. pp. iii–xvii.
- Of the Origin and Progress of Language. Vol. Six volumes. Edinburgh and London: J. Balfour and T. Cadell. 1773–1792.
- Antient Metaphysics. Vol. Six volumes. Edinburgh and London: Bell & Bradshute and T. Cadell. 1779–1799.
- "Advertisement" to John Brown, Letters upon the Poetry and Music of the Italian Opera, Addressed to a Friend (Edinburgh and London, Bell & Bradshute and C. Elliot and T. Kay, 1789)
- "Reports of Decisions of the Court of Session, 1738–68" in A Supplement to The Dictionary of Decisions of the Court of Session, ed. M. P. Brown (5 volumes, Edinburgh, J. Bell & W. Creech, 1826), volume 5, pp. 651–941

=== Correspondence ===
- James Burnett to James Harris, 31 December 1772
- James Burnett to Sir John Pringle, 16 June 1773
- James Burnett to James Boswell, 11 April and 28 May 1777, Yale University Boswell Papers, (C.2041 and C.2042)
- James Burnett to William Jones, 20 June 1789
- James Burnett to T. Cadell and J. Davies, 15 May 1796, British Museum, A letter bound into Dugald Stewart, Account of the Life and Writings of William Robertson, D.D., F.R.S.E, 2nd ed., London (1802). Shelf no.1203.f.3
