= Joshua Steele =

Irish planter and writer

Joshua Steele (c. 1700 – 1796) was an Irish planter and writer.

== Life ==
Born in Ireland, he resided many years in London. In 1756, he was elected a member of the Society of Arts.

Steele possessed estates in Barbados: Chester's, Hallett's and Kendal's. He went in 1780 to manage them himself. In 1781 he founded a society in Bridgetown similar to the London Society of Arts, in order to change the treatment of the slave population, and soon after that became a member of the council for the island. On his own estates he abolished arbitrary punishment, and created courts among the black slaves themselves for the punishment of offences. He also promoted voluntary labour by offering some wages.

In 1789 Steele further, by erecting his estates into manors, and making his slaves copyholders bound to their tenements, and owing rent and personal service which they paid in labour on the demesne lands. Steele encountered opposition; but on his own estates his system was successful. He also made efforts to employ the redlegs — the poor white population — and to set up local industries.

Steele died in Barbados on 27 October 1796.

== Works ==
Steele in 1775 published An Essay towards establishing the Melody and Measure of Speech to be expressed and perpetuated by certain Symbols, London, in which he proposed to extend to speech the symbolic method by which the modulations of musical sounds are expressed. His essay excited considerable interest, and was discussed, among others, by Lord Monboddo and David Garrick. A second edition, entitled Prosodia Rationalis, appeared in 1779. He also contributed two papers on musical instruments to Philosophical Transactions in 1775.

Steele's letters to Thomas Clarkson, describing the management of his estates, were published in 1814 in William Dickson's Mitigation of Slavery (1814). Obadiah Rich in his Bibliotheca Americana Nova attributed to Steele a pamphlet An Account of a late Conference on the Occurrences in America (London, 1766).

== Family ==
Around 1750 Steele married Sarah Osborne, the widow of Robert Osborne who owned a plantation in Barbados. In the 1780s Steele lived with Ann Slatia, a black slave woman, on the Byde Mill estate adjacent to the Kendal estate which he leased, and had two children with her. These children, themselves slaves, were among Steele's heirs.

== Notes ==
Attribution

This article incorporates text from a publication now in the public domain: Lee, Sidney, ed. (1898). "Steele, Joshua". Dictionary of National Biography. Vol. 54. London: Smith, Elder & Co.
