= Silver Jubilee Park =

Park in Coseley, England

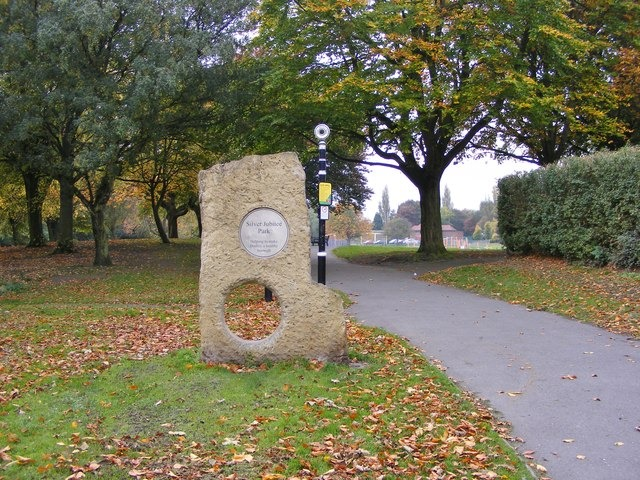
- Silver Jubilee Park, Coseley
- Interactive map of Silver Jubilee Park
- Location: Mason Street, Coseley, West Midlands, England
- Coordinates: 52°32′18.81″N 2°5′23.55″W
- Opened: 28 May 1936

Silver Jubilee Park is a public park situated in Coseley, West Midlands, England.

== History ==
The park was once former colliery land in Coseley that was obtained from the Earl of Dudley in December 1930 and turned into a public park.

It was named in honour of King George V's Silver Jubilee in 1935 and was officially opened on 28 May 1936 by the chairman of the Parks and Open Spaces Committee. King George V had died only four months before the park was opened to the public.

== Park ==
Silver Jubilee Park now has an outdoor gym, an activity centre that runs free activities and two tennis courts. There is also a children's play area, skate park and a multi use games area.
