= Andy Kellett =

English footballer

Personal information
- Full name: Andrew Paul Kellett
- Date of birth: 10 November 1993 (age 32)
- Place of birth: Bolton, England
- Position: Midfielder

Youth career
- 2002–2014: Bolton Wanderers

Senior career*
Years	Team	Apps	(Gls)
2014–2015	Bolton Wanderers	4	(0)
2014–2015	→ Plymouth Argyle (loan)	15	(1)
2015	→ Manchester United (loan)	0	(0)
2015–2018	Wigan Athletic	17	(2)
2017–2018	→ Chesterfield (loan)	41	(4)
2018–2019	Notts County	16	(1)
2019–2020	Fylde	0	(0)
2020	Alfreton Town	2	(0)
2020–2023	Guiseley	31	(1)
2023–2024	Bury	8	(0)
- * Club domestic league appearances and goals as of 20:15, 19 June 2023 (UTC)

Andrew Paul Kellett (born 10 November 1993) is an English professional footballer who plays as a midfielder. He most recently played for Bury.

He started his career at Bolton Wanderers and during the 2014–15 season, he also spent time on loan at Plymouth Argyle and Manchester United. He joined Wigan Athletic in 2015, but struggled to hold down a first-team place and joined Chesterfield on loan for the 2017–18 season before making a permanent move to Notts County in May 2018.

== Career ==
=== Bolton Wanderers ===
Kellett came through the Bolton Wanderers' academy and made his debut for the team in a 1–0 loss against Leicester City on 22 April 2014, coming on as a substitute for Robert Hall for the last 20 minutes of the Championship match. It was the first time in eight years a Bolton-born player had made his debut for the club after coming through the academy. He again came on from the bench the following game, a 3–1 away win at Sheffield Wednesday, where he was praised for his attitude and performance.

On 17 October, he joined League Two club Plymouth Argyle on a one-month loan, which was later extended for a further month. His first Plymouth appearance was a goalless draw at AFC Wimbledon four days after signing, and he scored his first career goal on 13 December, in a 3–2 win over Northampton Town at Sixfields Stadium.

On 2 February 2015, transfer deadline day, Manchester United signed Kellett on loan for the rest of the season, with Saidy Janko going in the opposite direction for the same period. According to Bolton manager Neil Lennon, Kellett believed that Lennon was "winding him up" when he mentioned United's interest in him. He made 10 appearances for the Manchester United under-21s during the loan, including one appearance in the 1–0 Manchester Senior Cup semi-final defeat away to his parent club, Bolton.

=== Wigan Athletic ===
After returning to Bolton, Kellett signed a three-year contract with newly relegated League One club Wigan Athletic on 1 September 2015, moving for an undisclosed fee. He made his debut four days later, coming on for Sean Murray in the 79th minute of a 3–2 win at Chesterfield.

Having not played for Wigan since March 2017, he joined League Two team Chesterfield on loan for the 2017–18 season in August, reuniting with former manager Gary Caldwell. He played 41 total matches for the relegated Spireites, scoring four times including in a 2–2 draw at local rivals Mansfield Town on 25 November.

He was released by Wigan at the end of the 2017–18 season.

=== Notts County ===
On 31 May 2018, Kellett signed for Notts County of League Two on a two-year contract. He made his debut on 11 August in a 3–2 loss at Cambridge United, playing the last nine minutes in place of Nathan Thomas, and two weeks later scored the only goal of his 16 appearances to equalise in a 3–1 loss at Lincoln City. On 27 August 2019, he left by mutual consent after not playing for Notts County at the start of the National League season.

=== Fylde ===
After being released by Notts County, Kellett signed for Fylde on a "short-term basis" in December 2019. He made just two appearances, both as a substitute and neither in the league, before signing for Alfreton Town in March 2020.

=== Bury ===
On 19 June 2023, after injury ridden stints at Alfreton Town and Guiseley, Kellett signed for Bury.
