= Tyreece Kennedy-Williams =

English footballer

Personal information
- Full name: Tyreece Kennedy-Williams
- Date of birth: 8 January 2001 (age 25)
- Place of birth: Nottingham, England
- Height: 1.73 m (5 ft 8 in)
- Position: Defender

Youth career
- Notts County

Senior career*
Years	Team	Apps	(Gls)
2018–2020	Notts County	0	(0)
2019–2020	→ Redditch United (loan)	19	(0)
- * Club domestic league appearances and goals as of 22:00, 17 February 2020 (UTC)

Tyreece Kennedy-Williams (born 8 January 2001) is an English footballer who plays as a defender.

== Playing career ==
=== Notts County ===
Kennedy-Williams made his debut for Notts County on 9 October 2018 in an EFL Trophy fixture at home to Newcastle United which the away side won 2–0, Tyreece played the full match.

Kennedy-Williams left Notts County at the end of the 2019-20 as his contract expired.
