= 2017–18 Notts County F.C. season =

Notts County
2017–18 season
- Owner: Alan Hardy
- Chairman: Alan Hardy
- Manager: Kevin Nolan
- Stadium: Meadow Lane
- League Two: 5th
- FA Cup: Fourth round (eliminated by Swansea City A.F.C.)
- EFL Cup: First round (eliminated by Scunthorpe United F.C.)
- EFL Trophy: Group stage
- Top goalscorer: League: Jorge Grant (15); All: Jorge Grant (19)
- Highest home attendance: 17,274 (league); 17,615 (playoffs)
- Lowest home attendance: 3,738 (league); 1,409 (EFL Trophy)
- Average home league attendance: 8,513
Home colours	Away colours	Third colours

The 2017–18 season was Notts County's 155th season in their history and their third consecutive season in League Two. Along with League Two, the club also competed in the FA Cup, EFL Cup and EFL Trophy. The season covers the period from 1 July 2017 to 30 June 2018.

== First-Team Squad ==
No.	Name	Pos.	Nat.	Place of birth	Age	Apps	Goals	Signed from	Date signed	Fee	Ends
Goalkeepers
1	Adam Collin	GK	(England)	Penrith	33	81	0	Rotherham United	1 July 2016	Free	2018
13	Branislav Pindroch	GK	(Slovakia)	Baskà Bystrica	26	4	0	MFK Karviná	31 July 2017	Free	2020
34	Ross Fitzsimons	GK	(England)	London	24	21	0	Chelmsford	27 July 2017	Trainee	2020
35	Joe Searson	GK	(England)	Nottingham	19	0	0	Academy		Trainee	Undisclosed
Defenders
2	Matt Tootle	RB	(England)	Knowsley	27	80	4	Shrewsbury Town	1 July 2016	Free	2020
3	Carl Dickinson	LB	(England)	Swadlincote	31	72	1	Port Vale	1 July 2016	Free	2018
4	Elliott Hewitt	RB/CM	(Wales)	Rhyl	24	124	6	Ipswich Town	4 August 2015	Free	2019
5	Richard Duffy	CB	(Wales)	Swansea	32	97	7	Eastleigh	1 July 2016	Free	Undisclosed
16	Shaun Brisley	CB	(England)	Macclesfield	28	46	3	Carlisle United	24 July 2017	Free	Undisclosed
19	Nicky Hunt	RB	(England)	Westhoughton	34	19	0	Leyton Orient	1 August 2017	Undisclosed	2018
23	Daniel Jones	LB	(England)	Rowley Regis	31	41	4	Chesterfield	3 July 2017	Free	2020
25	Ben Hall	CB	(Northern Ireland)	Omagh	21	11	0	Brighton & Hove Albion	30 January 2018	Loan	2018
33	Pierce Bird	CB	(England)	Nottingham	19	2	0	Academy	31 July 2017	Trainee	2018
38	Mike Edwards	CB	(England)	Hessle	38	352	30	Carlisle United	18 August 2014	Free	2018
Midfielders
6	Matty Virtue	LM	(England)	Epsom	21	15	0	Liverpool	11 January 2018	Loan	2018
8	Michael O'Connor	CM	(Northern Ireland)	Belfast	30	42	2	Port Vale	1 July 2016	Free	2018
10	Jorge Grant	CM	(England)	Banbury	23	73	25	Nottingham Forest	20 July 2017	Loan	2018
11	Terry Hawkridge	RM	(England)	Nottingham	28	37	3	Lincoln City	1 July 2017	Free	2019
12	Elliot Hodge	RM	(England)	Nottingham	22	4	0	Lincoln City	1 August 2017	Free	2018
15	Curtis Thompson	RM	(England)	Nottingham	24	100	2	Academy	1 July 2011	Trainee	2018
17	Alan Smith	CM	(England)	Rothwell	37	107	1	Milton Keynes Dons	1 July 2014	Free	2018
18	Liam Noble	CM	(England)	Newcastle upon Tyne	27	99	17	Forest Green Rovers	1 January 2018	Free	2019
21	Noor Husin	CM	(Afghanistan)	Mazar-i-Sharif	21	14	2	Crystal Palace	12 January 2018	Undisclosed	2019
24	Robert Milsom	LM	(England)	Redhill	31	81	1	Rotherham United	1 July 2015	Free	2018
37	Alex Howes	CM	(England)	Nottingham	18	2	0	Academy		Trainee	Undisclosed
44	Kevin Nolan	AM	(England)	Liverpool	36	0	0	Free agent	30 January 2017	Free	Undisclosed
Forwards
7	Lewis Alessandra	RW	(England)	Heywood	29	48	7	Hartlepool United	1 July 2017	Undisclosed	2019
9	Shola Ameobi	CF	(Nigeria)	Zaria	36	54	10	Fleetwood Town	3 February 2017	Free	2018
14	Jonathan Forte	LW	(Barbados)	Sheffield	31	108	33	Oldham Athletic	1 July 2016	Free	2018
26	Callum Saunders	CF	(Wales)	Istanbul	22	6	0	Crewe Alexandra	31 July 2017	Free	2018
28	Mason Bennett	CF	(England)	Langwith, Derbyshire	21	2	1	Derby County	31 January 2018	Loan	2018
30	Jon Stead	CF	(England)	Huddersfield	35	141	41	Huddersfield Town	2 July 2015	Free	2019
39	Sam Osborne	CF	(England)	Nottingham	18	3	0	Dunkirk	1 July 2016	Free	2018

== Statistics ==
As of match played 18 May 2018

No.	Pos	Nat	Player	Total		League Two (Note: Includes playoffs)		FA Cup		League Cup		League Trophy	
No.	Pos	Nat	Player	Apps	Goals	Apps	Goals	Apps	Goals	Apps	Goals	Apps	Goals
1	GK	(England) ENG	Adam Collin	34	0	32+0	0	2+0	0	0+0	0	0+0	0
2	DF	(England) ENG	Matt Tootle	42	2	38+0	2	3+0	0	0+1	0	0+0	0
3	DF	(England) ENG	Carl Dickinson	32	1	23+2	1	4+0	0	1+0	0	1+1	0
4	DF	(Wales) WAL	Elliott Hewitt	50	4	37+8	4	4+0	0	0+0	0	1+0	0
5	DF	(Wales) WAL	Richard Duffy	50	3	45+0	2	5+0	1	0+0	0	0+0	0
6	DF	(England) ENG	Haydn Hollis	4	1	0+0	0	0+0	0	1+0	0	3+0	1
6	DF	(England) ENG	Matty Virtue	15	0	10+4	0	1+0	0	0+0	0	0+0	0
7	FW	(England) ENG	Lewis Alessandra	48	7	28+13	7	3+1	0	0+0	0	2+1	0
8	MF	(Northern Ireland) NIR	Michael O'Connor	8	0	1+7	0	0+0	0	0+0	0	0+0	0
9	FW	(Nigeria) NGA	Shola Ameobi	37	6	26+9	6	2+0	0	0+0	0	0+0	0
10	MF	(England) ENG	Jorge Grant	56	19	37+10	16	5+0	2	1+0	1	1+2	0
11	MF	(England) ENG	Terry Hawkridge	37	3	29+2	3	5+0	0	1+0	0	0+0	0
12	MF	(England) ENG	Elliot Hodge	4	0	0+1	0	0+0	0	0+1	0	1+1	0
13	GK	(Slovakia) SVK	Branislav Pindroch	4	0	0+1	0	0+0	0	0+0	0	3+0	0
14	FW	(Barbados) BRB	Jonathan Forte	38	10	15+17	8	0+3	0	1+0	0	2+0	2
15	MF	(England) ENG	Curtis Thompson	4	0	0+0	0	0+0	0	0+1	0	2+1	0
16	DF	(England) ENG	Shaun Brisley	46	3	38+1	2	5+0	0	1+0	1	1+0	0
17	MF	(England) ENG	Alan Smith	26	1	0+18	0	0+4	0	0+1	0	3+0	1
18	MF	(England) ENG	Liam Noble	21	1	15+5	1	0+1	0	0+0	0	0+0	0
19	DF	(England) ENG	Nicky Hunt	19	0	10+3	0	2+0	0	1+0	0	3+0	0
20	MF	(Gibraltar) GIB	Liam Walker	15	0	6+5	0	0+1	0	0+0	0	3+0	0
21	MF	(Afghanistan) AFG	Noor Husin	14	2	10+2	1	2+0	1	0+0	0	0+0	0
22	MF	(England) ENG	Ryan Yates	29	6	25+0	3	3+0	2	1+0	1	0+0	0
23	DF	(England) ENG	Daniel Jones	33	4	25+4	4	1+1	0	0+0	0	2+0	0
24	MF	(England) ENG	Robert Milsom	22	1	12+5	1	0+1	0	1+0	0	3+0	0
25	MF	(England) ENG	Ben Hall	11	0	9+2	0	0+0	0	0+0	0	0+0	0
26	FW	(Wales) WAL	Callum Saunders	6	0	0+3	0	0+0	0	0+0	0	1+2	0
28	FW	(England) ENG	Mason Bennett	2	1	1+1	1	0+0	0	0+0	0	0+0	0
30	FW	(England) ENG	Jon Stead	52	13	40+5	9	5+0	4	1+0	0	0+1	0
33	DF	(England) ENG	Pierce Bird	2	0	0+1	0	0+0	0	0+0	0	1+0	0
34	GK	(England) ENG	Ross Fitzsimons	21	0	16+1	0	3+0	0	1+0	0	0+0	0

=== Goals Scored ===
As of end of season

Rank	No.	Nat.	Po.	Name	League Two (Note: Includes playoffs)	FA Cup	League Cup	League Trophy	Total
1	10	(England)	LM	Jorge Grant	16	2	1	0	19
2	30	(England)	CF	Jon Stead	9	4	0	0	13
3	14	(Barbados)	CF	Jonathan Forte	8	0	0	2	10
4	7	(England)	RW	Lewis Alessandra	7	0	0	0	7
5	9	(Nigeria)	CF	Shola Ameobi	6	0	0	0	6
5	22	(England)	CM	Ryan Yates	3	2	1	0	6
7	4	(Wales)	CB	Elliott Hewitt	4	0	0	0	4
7	23	(England)	LB	Daniel Jones	4	0	0	0	4
9	5	(Wales)	CB	Richard Duffy	2	1	0	0	3
9	11	(England)	RM	Terry Hawkridge	3	0	0	0	3
9	16	(England)	CB	Shaun Brisley	2	0	1	0	3
12	2	(England)	RB	Matt Tootle	2	0	0	0	2
12	21	(Afghanistan)	MF	Noor Husin	1	1	0	0	2
14	3	(England)	LB	Carl Dickinson	1	0	0	0	1
14	6	(England)	CB	Haydn Hollis	0	0	0	1	1
14	17	(England)	CM	Alan Smith	0	0	0	1	1
14	18	(England)	CM	Liam Noble	1	0	0	0	1
14	24	(England)	LM	Robert Milsom	1	0	0	0	1
14	28	(England)	FW	Mason Bennett	1	0	0	0	1
Total					71	10	3	4	88

=== Disciplinary record ===
As of end of season

Rank	No.	Nat.	Po.	Name	League Two (Note: Includes playoffs)			FA Cup			League Cup			League Trophy			Total		
Rank	No.	Nat.	Po.	Name	Booked	(yellow card) (yellow-red card)	Sent off (straight red)	Booked	(yellow card) (yellow-red card)	Sent off (straight red)	Booked	(yellow card) (yellow-red card)	Sent off (straight red)	Booked	(yellow card) (yellow-red card)	Sent off (straight red)	Booked	(yellow card) (yellow-red card)	Sent off (straight red)
1	34	(England)	GK	Ross Fitzsimons	1	0	1	0	0	0	0	0	0	0	0	0	1	0	1
2	4	(Wales)	CB	Elliott Hewitt	10	0	0	0	0	0	0	0	0	0	0	0	10	0	0
3	5	(Wales)	CB	Richard Duffy	8	0	0	1	0	0	0	0	0	0	0	0	9	0	0
4	10	(England)	LM	Jorge Grant	7	0	0	1	0	0	0	0	0	0	0	0	8	0	0
5	2	(England)	RB	Matt Tootle	4	1	0	1	0	0	0	0	0	0	0	0	5	1	0
6	9	(Nigeria)	CF	Shola Ameobi	6	0	0	0	0	0	0	0	0	0	0	0	6	0	0
6	18	(England)	CM	Liam Noble	5	0	0	1	0	0	0	0	0	0	0	0	6	0	0
6	30	(England)	CF	Jon Stead	5	0	0	0	0	0	1	0	0	0	0	0	6	0	0
9	6	(England)	LM	Matty Virtue	2	1	0	1	0	0	0	0	0	0	0	0	3	1	0
10	3	(England)	LB	Carl Dickinson	4	0	0	0	0	0	0	0	0	0	0	0	4	0	0
10	16	(England)	CB	Shaun Brisley	4	0	0	0	0	0	0	0	0	0	0	0	4	0	0
10	21	(Afghanistan)	MF	Noor Husin	4	0	0	0	0	0	0	0	0	0	0	0	4	0	0
10	23	(England)	LB	Daniel Jones	2	0	0	2	0	0	0	0	0	0	0	0	4	0	0
14	11	(England)	RM	Terry Hawkridge	3	0	0	0	0	0	0	0	0	0	0	0	3	0	0
14	22	(England)	CM	Ryan Yates	2	0	0	0	0	0	1	0	0	0	0	0	3	0	0
16	7	(England)	RW	Lewis Alessandra	2	0	0	0	0	0	0	0	0	0	0	0	2	0	0
16	14	(Barbados)	CF	Jonathan Forte	2	0	0	0	0	0	0	0	0	0	0	0	2	0	0
16	17	(England)	CM	Alan Smith	0	0	0	0	0	0	0	0	0	2	0	0	2	0	0
16	24	(England)	LM	Robert Milsom	2	0	0	0	0	0	0	0	0	0	0	0	2	0	0
20	6	(England)	DF	Haydn Hollis	0	0	0	0	0	0	0	0	0	1	0	0	1	0	0
20	19	(England)	RB	Nicky Hunt	1	0	0	0	0	0	0	0	0	0	0	0	1	0	0
20	25	(England)	CB	Ben Hall	1	0	0	0	0	0	0	0	0	0	0	0	1	0	0
Total					75	2	1	7	0	0	2	0	0	3	0	0	87	2	1

== Competitions ==
=== Friendlies ===
On 12 April 2017, Notts County announced they will face Nottingham Forest as part of pre-season. The Magpies also confirmed that they will visit Basford United. Two weeks later, Wigan Athletic was added as further opposition. A fifth friendly was arranged against York City.

8 July 2017	Rolls Royce Select XI	0–6	Notts County	Hucknall
15:00 BST		Report	Milsom; Tootle; Stead (x2); Ameobi; Smith	Stadium: Watnall Road

15 July 2017	Basford United	0–2	Notts County	Basford
15:00 BST		Report	Jones; Howes	Stadium: Greenwich Avenue

19 July 2017	Notts County	0–2	Nottingham Forest	Nottingham
19:45 BST		Report	Brereton 51'; Vellios 88'	Stadium: Meadow Lane

22 July 2017	Notts County	1–2	Wigan Athletic	Nottingham
15:00 BST	Alessandra	Report	Duffy (O.G.) 64'; Lang	Stadium: Meadow Lane

29 July 2017	Carlton Town	1–1	Notts County	Carlton
12:00 BST	McNicholas 21'	Report	Stead (?)	Stadium: Stokeld Stadium

29 July 2017	York City	1–2	Notts County	York
15:00 BST	Parkin 83' (pen.)	Report	Walker 45+1'; Bird 90+1'	Stadium: Bootham Crescent

=== League Two ===
==== League table ====
Pos	Team	Pld	W	D	L	GF	GA	GD	Pts	Promotion, qualification or relegation
3	Wycombe Wanderers (P)	46	24	12	10	79	60	+19	84	Promotion to EFL League One
4	Exeter City	46	24	8	14	64	54	+10	80	Qualification for League Two play-offs (Note: Four teams play for one spot and promotion to EFL League One.)
5	Notts County	46	21	14	11	71	48	+23	77	Qualification for League Two play-offs
6	Coventry City (O, P)	46	22	9	15	64	47	+17	75	Qualification for League Two play-offs
7	Lincoln City	46	20	15	11	64	48	+16	75	Qualification for League Two play-offs

Source: BBC Sport
Rules for classification: 1) Points; 2) Goal difference; 3) Number of goals scored
(O) Play-off winners; (P) Promoted

==== Result summary ====
Overall								Home						Away					
Pld	W	D	L	GF	GA	GD	Pts	W	D	L	GF	GA	GD	W	D	L	GF	GA	GD
46	21	14	11	71	48	+23	77	14	7	2	43	19	+24	7	7	9	28	29	−1

Last updated: 8 May 2018.

==== Results by matchday ====
Matchday	1	2	3	4	5	6	7	8	9	10	11	12	13	14	15	16	17	18	19	20	21	22	23	24	25	26	27	28	29	30	31	32	33	34	35	36	37	38	39	40	41	42	43	44	45	46
Ground	A	H	A	H	A	H	H	A	H	A	A	H	H	A	A	H	A	H	A	H	A	H	H	A	A	H	A	H	H	H	A	H	A	A	H	A	A	H	A	H	A	H	A	H	A	H
Result	L	W	W	D	W	W	W	W	W	W	L	D	W	L	D	W	D	W	D	W	D	D	D	W	L	W	D	L	L	W	L	W	D	L	W	D	W	D	L	D	L	W	W	W	L	D
Position	23	14	7	4	5	3	2	2	1	1	1	2	1	2	2	1	1	1	2	2	2	2	2	2	2	2	2	2	2	4	4	4	5	5	4	3	3	4	4	4	5	5	5	5	5	5

Updated to match(es) played on 7 May 2018. Source:
A = Away; H = Home; W = Win; D = Draw; L = Loss

==== Matches ====
On 21 June 2017, the league fixtures were announced.

5 August 2017 1	Coventry City	3–0	Notts County	Coventry
15:00 BST	Jones 29', 80', 90+5'	Report	Hewitt (yellow card) 76'	Stadium: Ricoh Arena; Attendance: 10,350; Referee: Anthony Backhouse

12 August 2017 2	Notts County	2–0	Chesterfield	Nottingham
15:00 BST	Grant 60', 90+6', (yellow card) 73'	Report	(yellow card) 29' Ugwu; (red card) 45' Scott Wiseman; (yellow card) 49' Reed; (yellow card) 63' Weir; (yellow card) 90+5' Hird	Stadium: Meadow Lane; Attendance: 7,021; Referee: Andy Haines

19 August 2017 3	Wycombe Wanderers	2–4	Notts County	High Wycombe
15:00 BST	Gape (yellow card) 48'; Freeman 49'; Jacobson 68'; El-Abd (yellow card) 90+2'	Report	Duffy 14'; El-Abd 15' (o.g.); Jones (yellow card) 27'; Forte 84'; Alessandra 89'; Ameobi (yellow card) 90'	Stadium: Adams Park; Attendance: 3,785; Referee: Graham Salisbury

25 August 2017 4	Notts County	2–2	Accrington Stanley	Nottingham
19:45 BST	Stead 33' (pen.); Grant 54'; Duffy (yellow card) 58'; Hewitt (yellow card) 63'; Tootle (yellow card) 80' (yellow-red card) 90+1'	Report	Hughes 58'; Donacien (yellow card) 65'; Leacock-McLeod (red card) 66'; Wilks (yellow card) 90+1' (goal) 90+4'	Stadium: Meadow Lane; Attendance: 6,087; Referee: Carl Boyeson

2 September 2017 5	Port Vale	0–1	Notts County	Burslem
15:00 BST	Worrall (yellow card) 90+2'	Report	Alessandra 67'; Hewitt (yellow card) 88'	Stadium: Vale Park; Attendance: 4,656; Referee: Robert Lewis

9 September 2017 6	Notts County	2–0	Morecambe	Nottingham
15:00 BST	Jones 27'; Hewitt (yellow card) 65'; Forte 85'	Report	Rose (yellow card) 26'; Müller (yellow card) 88'	Stadium: Meadow Lane; Attendance: 5,305; Referee: Richard Clark

12 September 2017 7	Notts County	1–0	Swindon Town	Nottingham
19:45 BST	Stead 32' (pen.)	Report	Luke Norris (yellow card) 33'	Stadium: Meadow Lane; Attendance: 5,107; Referee: Scott Duncan

16 September 2017 8	Crawley Town	0–1	Notts County	Crawley
15:00 BST	Yorwerth (yellow card) 79'	Report	Grant 55'; Forte (yellow card) 88'	Stadium: Broadfield Stadium; Attendance: 2,352; Referee: John Busby

23 September 2017 9	Notts County	4–1	Lincoln City	Nottingham
15:00 BST	Stead 39'; Milsom (yellow card) 41'; Tootle 55'; Grant 71'; Hawkridge 88'	Report	Knott (red card) 28'; Anderson 47'; Bostwick (yellow card) 52'; Raggett (yellow card) 79'; Habergham (yellow card) 87'	Stadium: Meadow Lane; Attendance: 11,672; Referee: Seb Stockbridge

26 September 2017 10	Exeter City	0–3	Notts County	Exeter
19:45		Report	Alessandra 2'; Dickinson (yellow card) 59'; Grant 61', 82'; Hunt (yellow card) 64'	Stadium: St James Park; Attendance: 4,760; Referee: Kevin Johnson

30 September 2017 11	Mansfield Town	3–1	Notts County	Mansfield
13:00 BST	Rose 47', 59'; Hemmings (yellow card) 60'; Duffy 63' (o.g.)	Report	Dickinson 90+2'	Stadium: Field Mill; Attendance: 7,072; Referee: Darren Drysdale

7 October 2017 12	Notts County	1–1	Forest Green Rovers	Nottingham
15:00 BST	Duffy (yellow card) 2'; Milsom (yellow card) 76' (goal) 90+6'	Report	Traoré (yellow card) 7'; Collins (yellow card) 19'; Bugiel 30'; Cooper (yellow card) 90+1'	Stadium: Meadow Lane; Attendance: 13,267; Referee: Lee Probert

14 October 2017 13	Notts County	2–1	Barnet	Nottingham
15:00 BST	Ameobi 16'; Yates 52'; Dickinson (yellow card) 66'	Report	Ricardo (yellow card) 48'; Akinola 81'; Nelson (yellow card) 84'	Stadium: Meadow Lane; Attendance: 5,804; Referee: Michael Salisbury

17 October 2017 14	Crewe Alexandra	2–0	Notts County	Crewe
19:45 BST	Lowery (yellow card) 31'; Raynes 44'; Bowery 66'; Ng (yellow card) 68'; Porter (yellow card) 88'	Report	Yates (yellow card) 64'; Ameobi (yellow card) 70'; Dickinson (yellow card) 82'	Stadium: Gresty Road; Attendance: 3,339; Referee: Robert Jones

21 October 2017 15	Carlisle United	1–1	Notts County	Carlisle
15:00 BST	Hope 25'; Miller (yellow card) 90'	Report	Yates 58'	Stadium: Brunton Park; Attendance: 4,730; Referee: David Webb

28 October 2017 16	Notts County	3–0	Newport County	Nottingham
15:00 BST	Grant 36', 55'; Ameobi 52'; Tootle (yellow card) 57'; Duffy (yellow card) 67'	Report	Dan Butler (red card) 34'; Nouble (yellow card) 42'; Demetriou (yellow card) 62'	Stadium: Meadow Lane; Attendance: 6,019; Referee: Craig Hicks

11 November 2017 17	Stevenage	1–1	Notts County	Stevenage
15:00 GMT	Newton 38'; Wilkinson (yellow card) 41'; Henry (yellow card) 45+1'; Samuel (yellow card) 83'; Martin (yellow card) 90+4'	Report	Hewitt (yellow card) 36' (goal) 58'; Hawkridge (yellow card) 38'	Stadium: Broadhall Way; Attendance: 2,962; Referee: Ross Joyce

18 November 2017 18	Notts County	3–1	Cheltenham Town	Nottingham
15:00 GMT	Grant 30', 52'; Brisley 54'	Report	Winchester 35'	Stadium: Meadow Lane; Attendance: 5,809; Referee: Ben Toner

21 November 2017 19	Yeovil Town	1–1	Notts County	Yeovil
19:45 GMT	Zoko 80' (pen.); Nelson (red card) 88'	Report	Forte 41'; Grant (yellow card) 83'	Stadium: Huish Park; Attendance: 2,338; Referee: Dean Whitestone

25 November 2017 20	Notts County	2–1	Colchester United	Nottingham
15:00 GMT	Tootle (yellow card) 10'; Duffy (yellow card) 64'; Ameobi 68' (pen.) (yellow card) 74'; Grant (yellow card) 77'; Yates 90+3'	Report	Mandron (yellow card) 67'; Jackson (yellow card) 74'; Kent (yellow card) 84'; Odelusi 89'	Stadium: Meadow Lane; Attendance: 6,770; Referee: Mark Heywood

9 December 2017 21	Luton Town	1–1	Notts County	Luton
15:00 GMT	Mullins 26'; Sheehan (yellow card) 62'	Report	Dickinson (yellow card) 23'; Hewitt (yellow card) 54'; Ameobi 61' (yellow card) 76'; Stead (yellow card) 67'	Stadium: Kenilworth Road; Attendance: 10,063; Referee: Charles Breakspear

16 December 2017 22	Notts County	0–0	Grimsby Town	Nottingham
15:00 GMT	Yates (yellow card) 90+3'	Report	Jones (yellow card) 38'; McKeown (yellow card) 70'	Stadium: Meadow Lane; Attendance: 8016; Referee: Craig Hicks

23 December 2017 23	Notts County	3–3	Cambridge United	Nottingham
15:00 GMT	Alessandra 74'; Brisley 87' (yellow card) 53'; Forte 90+3'	Report	Ikpeazu 40' (yellow card) 14'; Brown 49', 68' (yellow card) 21'; Carroll (yellow card) 72'; Forde (yellow card) 90+1'	Stadium: Meadow Lane; Attendance: 6,102; Referee: Anthony Backhouse

26 December 2017 24	Morecambe	1–4	Notts County	Morecambe
15:00	Lang 89'	Report	Grant 13', 59'; Alessandra 21', 86'	Stadium: Globe Arena; Attendance: 1,947; Referee: Seb Stockbridge

30 December 2017 25	Swindon Town	1–0	Notts County	Swindon
15:00	Norris 47'; Dunne (yellow card) 90+3'	Report	Brisley (yellow card) 17'; Grant (yellow card) 90+4'	Stadium: County Ground; Attendance: 6,247; Referee: Ben Toner

1 January 2018 26	Notts County	1–0	Port Vale	Nottingham
15:00	Duffy (yellow card) 31'; Hewitt (yellow card) 74'; Stead 86' (pen.)	Report	Pope (yellow card) 56'; Davis (yellow card) 90+5'	Stadium: Meadow Lane; Attendance: 7,241; Referee: (England) Darren Handley

13 January 2018 27	Lincoln City	2–2	Notts County	Lincoln
15:00	Rhead (yellow card) 30'; Frecklington 37'; Williams (yellow card) 49'; Green 67'; Waterfall (yellow card) 82'	Report	Stead 35'; Hawridge (yellow card) 59'; Alessandra (yellow card) 70'; Grant 76' (yellow card) 81'; Fitzsimons (yellow card) 90+6'	Stadium: Sincil Bank; Attendance: 9,603; Referee: (England) Ross Joyce

20 January 2018 28	Notts County	1–2	Exeter City	Nottingham
15:00	Stead 73' (pen.)	Report	Taylor 8'; Stockley 42'; Archibald-Henville (yellow card) 73'	Stadium: Meadow Lane; Attendance: 6,677; Referee: Antony Coggins

23 January 2018 29	Notts County	1–2	Crawley Town	Nottingham
19:45 GMT	Virtue (yellow card) 28' (yellow-red card) 90'; Brisley (yellow card) 45'; Stead 58' (pen.); Fitzsimons (red card) 90+3'	Report	Smith 25'; Verheydt (yellow card) 37'; Lelan (yellow card) 48'; Payne 90+5' (pen.)	Stadium: Meadow Lane; Attendance: 3,738; Referee: Robert Lewis

3 February 2018 30	Notts County	4–1	Crewe Alexandra	Nottingham
15:00 GMT	Husin 15' (yellow card) 65'; Hewitt 41', 60'; Bennett 89'	Report	Miller 11'; Nolan (yellow card) 43'	Stadium: Meadow Lane; Attendance: 17,274; Referee: Brett Huxtable

10 February 2018 31	Barnet	1–0	Notts County	Canons Park
15:00 GMT	Nicholls 90+3'	Report	Duffy (yellow card) 15'; Husin (yellow card) 62'; Noble (yellow card) 74'	Stadium: The Hive Stadium; Attendance: 1,752; Referee: John Busby

13 February 2018 32	Notts County	2–1	Carlisle United	Nottingham
19:45 GMT	Stead 19', 35'; Noble (yellow card) 62'; Duffy (yellow card) 79'; Husin (yellow card) 80'; Alessandra (yellow card) 81'	Report	Devitt 75'	Stadium: Meadow Lane; Attendance: 3,889; Referee: Darren Drysdale

17 February 2018 33	Newport County	0–0	Notts County	Newport
15:00 UTC	Pipe (yellow card) 36'; Labadie (yellow card) 86'	Report	Stead (yellow card) 51'	Stadium: Rodney Parade; Attendance: 3,326; Referee: Robert Lewis

20 February 2018 34	Cambridge United	1–0	Notts County	Cambridge
19:45 GMT	Elito 30'	Report	Grant (yellow card) 56'	Stadium: Abbey Stadium; Attendance: 3,524; Referee: Charles Breakspear

24 February 2018 35	Notts County	2–0	Stevenage	Nottingham
15:00 GMT	Husin (yellow card) 67'; Grant 77'; Ameobi 80'	Report	Martin (yellow card) 43'	Stadium: Meadow Lane; Attendance: 5,684; Referee: Kevin Johnson

6 March 2018 36	Cheltenham Town	1–1	Notts County	Cheltenham
19:45 GMT	Morrell 66'; Graham (yellow card) 90+2'	Report	Hawkridge 42'; Grant (yellow card) 90+2'	Stadium: Whaddon Road; Attendance: 2,273; Referee: Graham Horwood

10 March 2018 37	Forest Green Rovers	1–2	Notts County	Nailsworth
15:00 GMT	Campbell 72'; Collins (yellow card) 86'; Cooper (yellow card) 90+3'	Report	Noble 34' (yellow card) 89'; Tootle 80'; Duffy (yellow card) 87'	Stadium: The New Lawn; Attendance: 2,893; Referee: Mark Heywood

17 March 2018 38	Notts County	1–1	Mansfield Town	Nottingham
13:00 GMT	Hawkridge 35'; Hewitt (yellow card) 90+8'	Report	Atkinson (yellow card) 53'; Benning (yellow card) 72'; MacDonald (yellow card) 88'; Hemmings 90+9' (pen.)	Stadium: Meadow Lane; Attendance: 12,563; Referee: Andy Woolmer

25 March 2018 39	Chesterfield	3–1	Notts County	Chesterfield
13:30 BST	Nelson 16'; Zavon Hines 39'; Whitmore (yellow card) 82'; Dennis 90+8' (pen.)	Report	Stead (yellow card) 63'; Jones 85'	Stadium: Proact Stadium; Attendance: 6,005; Referee: Seb Stockbridge

30 March 2018 40	Notts County	0–0	Wycombe Wanderers	Nottingham
15:00 BST	Hawkridge (yellow card) 55'; Tootle (yellow card) 58'; Brisley (yellow card) 77'; Noble (yellow card) 86'; Ameobi (yellow card) 90+2'	Report	Jacobson (yellow card) 27'; Tyson (yellow card) 33'; Brown (yellow card) 50'; El-Abd (yellow card) 90+3'	Stadium: Meadow Lane; Attendance: 8,038; Referee: Ben Toner

2 April 2018 41	Accrington Stanley	1–0	Notts County	Accrington
15:00 BST	Mark Hughes 9'	Report		Stadium: Wham Stadium; Attendance: 3,039; Referee: John Busby

7 April 2018 42	Notts County	2–1	Coventry	Nottingham
15:00 BST	Noble (yellow card) 50'; Ameobi (yellow card) 52'; Forte 60', 86'	Report	Biamou (yellow card) 45'; McDonald (yellow card) 52'; Bayliss (yellow card) 57'; Burge (yellow card) 60'; Ponticelli 85'	Stadium: Meadow Lane; Attendance: 10,316; Referee: Ross Joyce

14 April 2018 43	Colchester United	1–3	Notts County	Colchester
15:00 BST	Wright 9'	Report	Forte 51'; Virtue (yellow card) 52'; Ameobi 69'; Duffy 76'; Stead (yellow card) 82'; Hewitt (yellow card) 86'	Stadium: Colchester Community Stadium; Attendance: 3,599; Referee: Brendan Malone

21 April 2018 44	Notts County	4–1	Yeovil Town	Nottingham
15:00 BST	Jones 45+2'; James 54' (o.g.); Hewitt 69'; Stead (yellow card) 73'; Alessandra 73'	Report	Gobern (yellow card) 31'; Fisher 90+2'	Stadium: Meadow Lane; Attendance: 7,359; Referee: Anthony Backhouse

28 April 2018 45	Grimsby Town	2–1	Notts County	Grimsby
15:00 BST	Clarke 29'; Woolford (yellow card) 59'; Matt 90+3'; Rose (yellow card) 90+6'	Report	Virtue (yellow card) 24'; Jones 90'	Stadium: Blundell Park; Attendance: 7,133; Referee: Carl Boyeson

5 May 2018 46	Notts County	0–0	Luton Town	Nottingham
15:00 BST	Jones (yellow card) 65'; Forte (yellow card) 72'; Hall (yellow card) 81'	Report	Danny Hylton (yellow card) 45+1' (yellow-red card) 58'; Alan Sheehan (yellow card) 90'	Stadium: Meadow Lane; Attendance: 12,184; Referee: Darren Handley

==== Football League play-offs ====
12 May 2018 Semi final (1st leg)	Coventry City	1–1	Notts County	Coventry
19:30 BST	Stokes (yellow card) 26'; Doyle (yellow card) 28'; Hyam (yellow card) 75'; McNulty 87' (pen.)	Report	Forte 49'; Grant (yellow card) 74'; Duffy (yellow card) 86'; O'Connor (yellow card) 89'	Stadium: Ricoh Arena; Attendance: 17,404; Referee: Gavin Ward

18 May 2018 Semi final (2nd leg)	Notts County	1–4 (2–5 agg.)	Coventry City	Nottingham
19:45 BST	Tootle (yellow card) 16'; Alessandra (yellow card) 30'; Grant 44'; Brisley (yellow card) 45+4'	Report	Biamou 6', 71'; Doyle (yellow card) 24'; McNulty 37', (yellow card) 45+5'; Bayliss 86'	Stadium: Meadow Lane; Attendance: 17,615; Referee: Darren Drysdale

=== FA Cup ===
On 16 October 2017, Notts County were drawn at home against Bristol Rovers in the first round. Another home tie, against non-league Oxford City, was confirmed for the second round. A trip to Championship side Brentford was set for the third round.

3 November 2017 First round	Notts County	4–2	Bristol Rovers	Nottingham
19:45 GMT	Yates 30', 31'; Stead 58'; Jones (yellow card) 90+4'; Grant 90+6'	Report	Sercombe 8'; Sinclair 12'; Clarke (yellow card) 64'	Stadium: Meadow Lane; Attendance: 4,228; Referee: Graham Salisbury

2 December 2017 Second round	Notts County	3–2	Oxford City	Nottingham
12:30 GMT	Duffy 31'; Stead 56' (pen.); Grant 90+5'	Report	Sinclair 53'; Grant (yellow card) 55'; Paterson 73'	Stadium: Meadow Lane; Attendance: 5,092; Referee: John Brooks

6 January 2018 Third round	Brentford	0–1	Notts County	Brentford
15:00 GMT		Report	Tootle (yellow card) 52'; Duffy (yellow card) 54'; Stead 65'; Jones (yellow card) 68'; Noble (yellow card) 90+2'	Stadium: Griffin Park; Attendance: 6,935; Referee: Tim Robinson

27 January 2018 Fourth round	Notts County	1–1	Swansea City	Nottingham
15:00 GMT	Stead 62'; Grant (yellow card) 84'	Report	Sanches (yellow card) 22'; Narsingh 45'; Nordfelt (yellow card) 55'	Stadium: Meadow Lane; Attendance: 9,802; Referee: Mike Jones

6 February 2018 Fourth round replay	Swansea City	8–1	Notts County	Swansea
20:05 GMT	Abraham 18', 45+3'; Dyer 20', 30'; Clucas (yellow card) 41'; Naughton 53'; Routledge 57'; Carroll 65'; James 82'	Report	Husin 35'; Virtue (yellow card) 90+1'	Stadium: Liberty Stadium; Attendance: 7,822; Referee: Martin Atkinson

=== EFL Cup ===
On 16 June 2017, Notts County were drawn away to Scunthorpe United in the first round.

8 August 2017 First round	Scunthorpe United	3–3 (a.e.t.) (6–5 p)	Notts County	Scunthorpe
19:45 BST	Madden 69' (pen.), 105+1'; Holmes 86'	Report	Grant 22'; Brisley 90+2'; Yates 117'	Stadium: Glanford Park; Attendance: 1,874; Referee: David Webb
	Penalties
	Madden (penalty scored); van Veen (penalty scored); Adelakun (penalty scored); Townsend (penalty scored); Redmond (penalty scored); Holmes (penalty scored)		Smith (penalty scored); Thompson (penalty scored); Milsom (penalty scored); Brisley (penalty scored); Forte (penalty scored); Toolte (penalty missed)

=== EFL Trophy ===
On 12 July 2017, Notts County were drawn alongside Everton U21s, Lincoln City and Mansfield Town in Northern Group G.

Pos	Lge	Team	Pld	W	PW	PL	L	GF	GA	GD	Pts	Qualification
1	L2	Lincoln City (Q)	3	3	0	0	0	7	3	+4	9	Round 2
2	L2	Mansfield Town (Q)	3	2	0	0	1	4	4	0	6	Round 2
3	L2	Notts County (E)	3	1	0	0	2	4	5	−1	3	
4	ACA	Everton U21 (E)	3	0	0	0	3	2	5	−3	0	

Updated to match(es) played on 7 November 2017. Source: EFL.com
(E) Eliminated; (Q) Qualified to the phase indicated

15 August 2017 Group Game 1	Notts County	2–1	Everton U21s	Nottingham
19:45 BST	Forte 30'; Hollis 36'		Donkor 55'	Stadium: Meadow Lane; Attendance: 1,409

24 October 2017 Group Game 2	Notts County	1–2	Mansfield Town	Nottingham
19:45 BST	Smith 34' (yellow card) 74'	Report	Angol 1'; Hamilton 73'	Stadium: Meadow Lane; Referee: Graham Horwood

7 November 2017 Group Game 3	Lincoln City	2–1	Notts County	Lincoln
19:45 GMT	Bird 37' (o.g.); Ginnelly 86'	Report	Forte 27'; Hollis (yellow card) 52'; Smith (yellow card) 87'	Stadium: Sincil Bank; Attendance: 3,026; Referee: Tom Nield

== Transfers ==
=== Transfers in ===
Date from	Position	Nationality	Name	From	Fee	Ref.
1 July 2017	RW	(England)	Lewis Alessandra	Hartlepool United	Undisclosed	
1 July 2017	RM	(England)	Terry Hawkridge	Lincoln City	Free	
3 July 2017	LB	(England)	Daniel Jones	Chesterfield	Free	
24 July 2017	CB	(England)	Shaun Brisley	Carlisle United	Free	
25 July 2017	CM	(Gibraltar)	Liam Walker	Europa	Free	
27 July 2017	GK	(England)	Ross Fitzsimons	Chelmsford City	Free	
31 July 2017	DF	(England)	Pierce Bird	Dunkirk	Free	
31 July 2017	GK	(Slovakia)	Branislav Pindroch	MFK Karviná	Free	
31 July 2017	CF	(Wales)	Callum Saunders	Crewe Alexandra	Free	
1 August 2017	RM	(England)	Elliot Hodge	Lincoln City	Free	
1 August 2017	RB	(England)	Nicky Hunt	Leyton Orient	Free	
1 January 2018	CM	(England)	Liam Noble	Forest Green Rovers	Free	

=== Transfers out ===
Date from	Position	Nationality	Name	To	Fee	Ref.
1 July 2017	RB	(England)	Wes Atkinson	Free agent	Released	
1 July 2017	CB	(France)	Thierry Audel	Barrow	Released	(Note: Thierry Audel joined Barrow following his release.)
1 July 2017	CF	(England)	Adam Campbell	Morecambe	Released	(Note: Adam Campbell joined Morecambe following his release.)
1 July 2017	ST	(England)	Montel Gibson	Free agent	Released	
1 July 2017	GK	(England)	Scott Loach	Hartlepool United	Released	(Note: Scott Loach joined Hartlepool United following his release.)
1 July 2017	MF	(England)	Jack McMillan	Free agent	Released	
1 July 2017	RB	(England)	Jordan Richards	Free agent	Released	
1 July 2017	DM	(Antigua and Barbuda)	Luther Wildin	Nuneaton Town	Released	(Note: Luther Wildin joined Nuneaton Town following his release.)
1 July 2017	LW	(Republic of Ireland)	Mark Yeates	Eastleigh	Released	(Note: Mark Yeates joined Eastleigh following his release.)

=== Loans in ===
Start date	Position	Nationality	Name	From	End date	Ref.
20 July 2017	CM	(England)	Jorge Grant	Nottingham Forest	30 June 2018	
4 August 2017	CM	(England)	Ryan Yates	Nottingham Forest	30 June 2018	
30 January 2018	CB	(Northern Ireland)	Ben Hall	Brighton & Hove Albion	30 June 2018	

=== Loans out ===
Start date	Position	Nationality	Name	To	End date	Ref.
8 September 2017	CB	(England)	Pierce Bird	Leek Town	13 October 2017	
8 September 2017	AM	(Scotland)	Dominic Brown-Hill	Shaw Lane	Work experience	
8 September 2017	GK	(England)	Curtis Hall	Kimberley Miners Welfare	Work experience	
21 September 2017	DF	(England)	Peter Dearle	Gainsborough Trinity	Work experience	
21 September 2017	RW	(England)	Sam Osborne	Shaw Lane	Work experience	
13 October 2017	GK	(England)	Curtis Hall	Romulus	Work experience	
13 October 2017	MF	(England)	Jordon Richards	Halesowen Town	12 November 2017	
27 November 2017	GK	(England)	Joe Searson-Smithard	Radford	Work experience	
