= Carl Dickinson =

English footballer (born 1987)

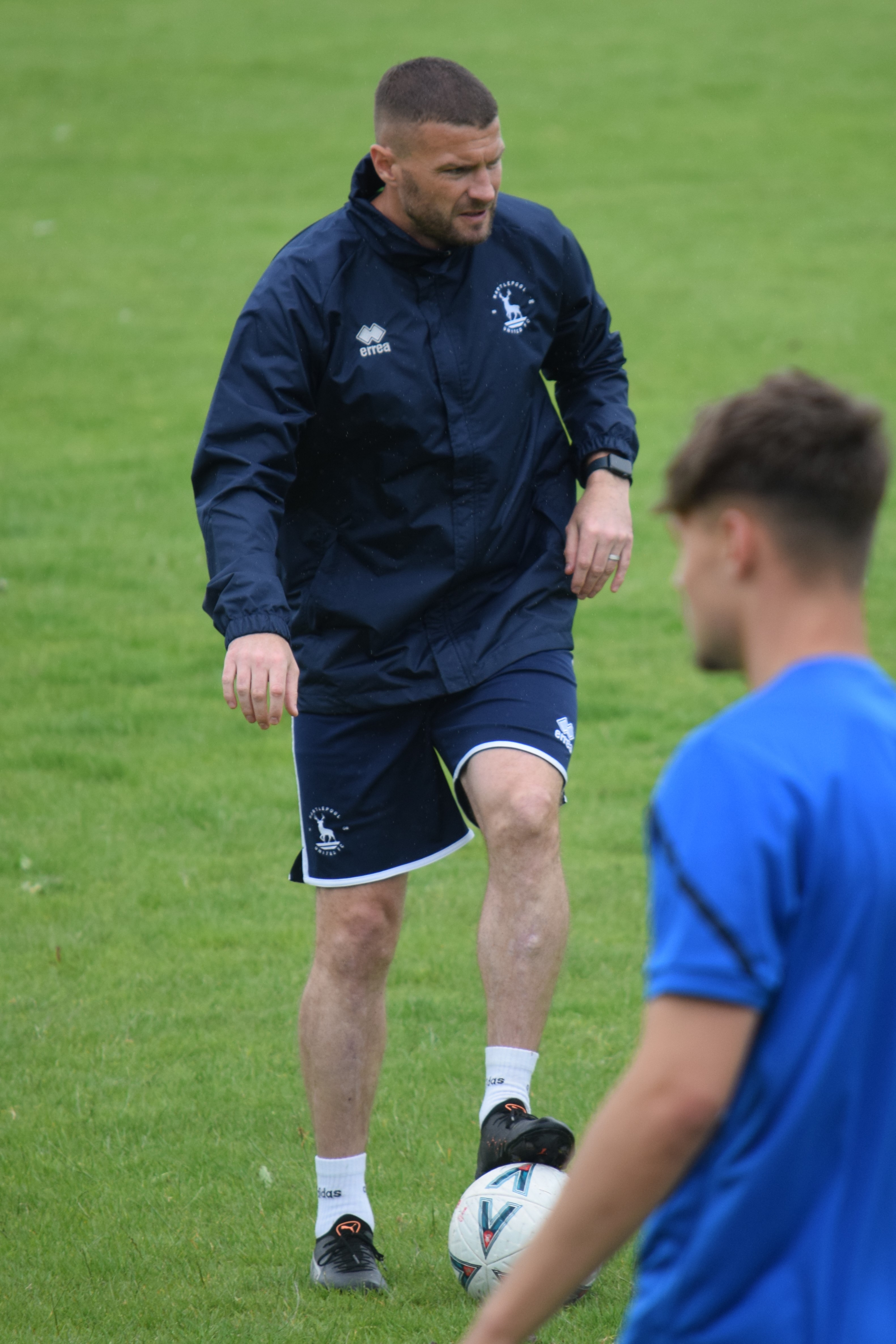
- Dickinson coaching before a Hartlepool United game in 2024

Personal information
- Full name: Carl Matthew Dickinson
- Date of birth: 31 March 1987 (age 39)
- Place of birth: Swadlincote, England
- Height: 1.85 m (6 ft 1 in)
- Positions: Left back; centre-back

Team information
- Current team: Chasetown

Youth career
- 2001–2002: Derby County
- 2002–2004: Stoke City

Senior career*
Years	Team	Apps	(Gls)
2004–2011	Stoke City	51	(0)
2006	→ Víkingur (loan)	2	(0)
2006	→ Blackpool (loan)	7	(0)
2009	→ Leeds United (loan)	7	(0)
2009–2010	→ Barnsley (loan)	28	(1)
2010–2011	→ Portsmouth (loan)	36	(0)
2011–2013	Watford	43	(2)
2012	→ Portsmouth (loan)	6	(0)
2013	→ Coventry City (loan)	6	(0)
2013–2016	Port Vale	127	(4)
2016–2018	Notts County	59	(1)
2018–2021	Yeovil Town	94	(2)
2021–2022	Hanley Town	38	(7)
2022–2023	Stratford Town	8	(1)
2023	Nantwich Town	4	(0)
2023	Eccleshall	2	(0)
2023	Bury	0	(0)
2023–2024	Congleton Town	33	(6)
2025	Congleton Town	9	(0)
2025	Abbey Hulton United	7	(0)
2025–2026	Leek Town	4	(1)
Total		571	(25)

Managerial career
- 2021–2022: Hanley Town (player-manager)
- 2026–: Chasetown
- * Club domestic league appearances and goals

Carl Matthew Dickinson (born 31 March 1987) is an English former professional footballer who now manages Northern Premier League Division One West club Chasetown.

A defender, Dickinson started his career at Stoke City and had loan spells at Icelandic club Víkingur and Blackpool before helping the "Potters" to win promotion into the Premier League in 2007–08. He then dropped out of the first-team picture and spent time on loan at Leeds United, Barnsley, and Portsmouth. He was sold to Watford for a £250,000 fee in July 2011 and was a first-team regular in the 2011–12 campaign. However, he fell out of favour the following season. He was loaned out to Portsmouth and Coventry City before being allowed to join Port Vale on a free transfer in July 2013. He spent three years with Port Vale and also served as club captain before he moved on to Notts County for two years in June 2016. He joined Yeovil Town in June 2018 and made 104 league and cup appearances over three years. He was appointed as player-manager at Hanley Town. He led the club to the Midland League Premier Division title in the 2021–22 season. He left Hanley Town in October 2022 and went on to play for Stratford Town, Nantwich Town, Eccleshall, Bury, Congleton Town, and Abbey Hulton United. Congleton won the Midland League Premier Division and Midland League Cup at the end of the 2023–24 season. He took charge at Chasetown in April 2026.

== Playing career ==
=== Stoke City ===
Dickinson spent his early youth at the Derby County academy before he joined Stoke City's academy in 2002. He made his senior debut on 11 December 2004, replacing Carl Asaba in the last moments of a 1–0 victory over Coventry City at the Britannia Stadium.

His next first-team involvement came on 1 April 2006, when he played the full ninety minutes of a 1–1 draw with Sheffield United. Two days later he signed a professional contract with the club. He played four further Championship games in what remained of the 2005–06 season. His chance to shine at the first-team level came after manager Johan Boskamp decided to blood Stoke's young players.

Dickinson spent summer 2006 on loan at Icelandic club Víkingur, along with teammate Keith Thomas, and played two Úrvalsdeild games. He played four games for Stoke at the beginning of the 2006–07 season before he was allowed to join League One side Blackpool on a one-month-long loan on 20 October. Manager Simon Grayson later extended the loan for a further month, as Dickinson continued to cover for injured left-backs Danny Coid and Paul Tierney. He played a total of ten games during his time at Bloomfield Road. After returning to Stoke, Dickinson put in a series of impressive performances at left-back. His commitment and ability made him a firm favourite with the club's supporters and earned him a contract extension.

Dickinson played 27 times for Stoke during the 2007–08 season as Tony Pulis led the "Potters" to promotion into the Premier League. He played in the first three opening Premier League games for Stoke before he lost his first-team place to Danny Higginbotham. On 15 January 2009, Dickinson joined Leeds United on a one-month loan, having been signed by Simon Grayson for the second time in his career. He made his first appearance for the club two days later at Brighton, where Leeds won 2–0. He made seven League One starts at Elland Road and was recalled to Stoke at the end of the loan period, despite Leeds wishing to extend the deal. In total, he played five top-flight games in the 2008–09 campaign.

On 23 September 2009, Dickinson joined Championship side Barnsley on loan for three months, along with teammate Ryan Shotton. He scored his first goal in the English Football League on 21 November, with a 93rd minute free kick against Cardiff City that proved to be the only goal of the game at Oakwell. He remained with Mark Robins's "Tykes" for the rest of the 2009–10 season, putting in 29 appearances. A knee injury picked up in mid-March ended his season prematurely.

Dickinson joined Championship side Portsmouth on loan for the whole of the 2010–11 season. He went on to play 39 games for Steve Cotterill's "Pompey", though started just 23 league games after losing his first-team place to Hermann Hreiðarsson. After retiring, he admitted he had performed poorly at Fratton Park due to frequently travelling the long distance to visit his young family back at his Staffordshire home.

=== Watford ===
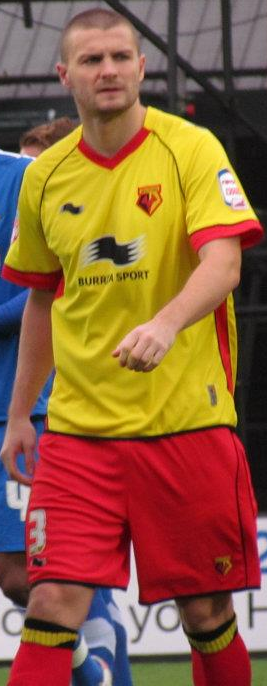
Dickinson playing for Watford in 2012

In July 2011, Dickinson signed for Sean Dyche's Watford on a three-year contract. The fee for the deal was undisclosed, though it was thought to be in the region of £250,000. Dickinson's work rate and robust style of defending earned him comparisons with former Watford fans' favourite Paul Robinson at the start of his Watford career. He scored his first goal for the "Hornets" on 27 September against fellow relegation strugglers Millwall, in a 2–1 win at Vicarage Road. He also scored a long-range strike against Bristol City in a 2–2 draw on 29 November. He ended the 2011–12 campaign with 41 appearances to his name.

On 22 October 2012, Dickinson rejoined his former club, Portsmouth, on an initial month-long loan. Manager Michael Appleton was replaced by Guy Whittingham during this spell, and Whittingham decided not to extend Dickinson's loan. He played five games, which all ended in defeats, and he picked up four yellow cards. On 12 February 2013, Dickinson joined Coventry City on a 28-day loan, in a move that reunited him with former Barnsley boss Mark Robins. He started six League One games for both Portsmouth and Coventry. On 24 July 2013, Dickinson had his contract at Watford cancelled by mutual consent after being deemed surplus to requirements by manager Gianfranco Zola.

=== Port Vale ===
Dickinson joined Port Vale in July 2013, signing a one-year contract. Manager Micky Adams stated that: "Carl has performed at a higher level than League One and that experience will be invaluable for us, especially as he can perform at centre-back as well as left-back." He was well received by Vale supporters despite previously being a popular player at local rivals Stoke. He opened the 2013–14 season in a centre-back partnership with Chris Robertson, and said he "enjoyed the challenge" and that "if I can make centre-half my shirt, happy days." He managed to start every game until picking up a suspension in mid-October. His performances made him a strong contender for the club's Player of the Year award and made him a popular player with supporters. At the end of the season he signed a new two-year contract.

He was appointed as club captain in August 2014, taking the armband from the departed Doug Loft. He scored his first goal for the "Valiants" and only his fourth career goal in a 3–1 victory at Doncaster Rovers on 16 August, earning himself a mention on the Football League team of the week in the process. However, he was dropped from the starting line-up two months later after admitting "I haven't been good enough for the standards I set myself every day". After returning to the first-team he stated that a talk with manager Rob Page helped him to calm down as he had put "a bit too much pressure" on himself after taking over the captaincy. He remained in poor form however, but said the criticism from the fans did not affect him after providing the assist for Tom Pope in the win against nearby rivals Walsall on 14 February.

He was an ever-present for the first 26 games of the 2015–16 season before being sent off for an off the ball incident in a 2–1 defeat at Rochdale on 28 November; earlier in the game he also gave away a penalty though opposition manager Keith Hill admitted Dickinson had made an "excellent challenge... I think the referee has got that wrong". Whilst serving his suspension he defended his teammate's from booing, stating that negative fans who booed should "shut up and get behind the team". He was offered a new contract in the summer, though the offer included a "considerable pay cut". He announced his departure from the club in June 2016. Dickinson was named as Port Vale's second best left-back of the 2010s in a public poll taken in January 2020 by The Sentinel; he received 40% of the vote, 10% behind Lee Collins.

=== Notts County ===
Dickinson signed a two-year contract with EFL League Two side Notts County in June 2016. He and the club endured a difficult 2016–17 campaign, which Dickinson said was the most "mentally challenging" of his career after the "Magpies" faced a change of ownership, manager and an unexpected relegation battle. He had expected to help lead a promotion charge under manager John Sheridan, but ended the season at Meadow Lane fighting on-loan Arsenal defender Marc Bola for the left-back spot under new boss Kevin Nolan. During the 2017–18 season he faced a battle with Daniel Jones for the left-back spot. He made 32 appearances by the end of the 2017–18 campaign and was released in May 2018.

=== Yeovil Town ===
On 21 June 2018, Dickinson signed a two-year contract with League Two side Yeovil Town. He made 37 appearances for the "Glovers" in the 2018–19 campaign but began training with former club Port Vale after he was told he was not in the Yeovil's first-team plans following manager Darren Way's sacking in March. Yeovil were relegated out of the English Football League at the end of the campaign. Yeovil were fourth in the National League and Dickinson had 29 appearances to his name by the time the 2019–20 season was suspended due to the COVID-19 pandemic in England; meanwhile during the break in play his impression of former manager Tony Pulis became a viral video on Twitter. Yeovil entered the play-offs at the quarter-final stage, where they were beaten 2–0 by Barnet. He made 37 appearances in the 2020–21 campaign and said he really enjoyed playing under manager Darren Sarll.

=== Later career ===
After leaving his management position at Hanley Town, Dickinson joined Southern League Premier Division Central club Stratford Town as a player on 10 November 2022. He moved on to Northern Premier League Premier Division side Nantwich Town the following year. He joined Eccleshall of the North West Counties League Division One South in March 2023 to aid the club during an injury crisis. He signed for North West Counties League Premier Division side Bury on 11 June 2023. However, he left Bury the following month due to the long commute from his home. Upon leaving Bury, he signed with Congleton Town, linking up with former Port Vale teammates Richard Duffy and Anthony Griffith. Congleton were crowned Midland League Premier Division champions at the end of the 2023–24 season. Congleton also beat Highgate United 5–1 in the Midland League Cup final. He spent several months focusing on his coaching career before he rejoined Congleton Town in March 2025. He gave away a penalty in the play-off final defeat to Hednesford Town. On 24 June 2025, he signed with newly-promoted Midland League Premier Division club Abbey Hulton United.

== Coaching career ==
On 17 March 2021, it was reported that Dickinson had "agreed in principle" to sign a three-year contract to join North West Counties Premier Division club Hanley Town as player-manager. He signed former Port Vale teammate Louis Dodds. Hanley were transferred to the Midland League Premier Division for the 2021–22 season and would win the league title to secure a place in Northern Premier League Division One West. He also began coaching the under-12s at Stoke City's Academy in February 2022. On 13 October 2022, Dickinson and assistant manager Dave Kevan left Hanley Town by mutual consent due to "increased business costs". He stated that "I've had to make the choice which had to suit not only me and my family but also make sure helped the club as well". He was reported to have left the club in March 2025, though head coach Anthony Limbrick refused to confirm or deny the reports.

Dickinson joined National League club Hartlepool United as Darren Sarll's assistant in May 2024. After Sarll left Hartlepool, Dickinson took on a new role as strength and conditioning coach. Dickinson left the club in May 2025. He joined Leek Town as a coach in January 2026.

On 14 April 2026, Dickinson was appointed as first-team manager at Northern Premier League Division One West club Chasetown, though he took charge of training and matchdays only at the end of the 2025–26 season.

== Style of play ==
Dickinson was a vocal player who was noted for his commitment, hard work, and dedication.

== Personal life ==
His son, Zac (born August 2010), played in the Stoke City Academy in 2022. Dickinson worked as a personal trainer after his playing career finished.

== Career statistics ==
As of end of the 2025-26 season

Appearances and goals by club, season and competition
Club	Season	League			FA Cup		League Cup		Other		Total	
Club	Season	Division	Apps	Goals	Apps	Goals	Apps	Goals	Apps	Goals	Apps	Goals
Stoke City	2004–05	Championship	1	0	0	0	0	0	—		1	0
Stoke City	2005–06	Championship	5	0	0	0	0	0	—		5	0
Stoke City	2006–07	Championship	13	0	0	0	1	0	—		14	0
Stoke City	2007–08	Championship	27	0	2	0	1	0	—		30	0
Stoke City	2008–09	Premier League	5	0	1	0	3	0	—		9	0
Stoke City	2009–10	Premier League	0	0	0	0	1	0	—		1	0
Stoke City	2010–11	Premier League	0	0	0	0	0	0	—		0	0
Stoke City	Total		51	0	3	0	6	0	—		60	0
Víkingur (loan)	2006	Úrvalsdeild	2	0	—		—		—		2	0
Blackpool (loan)	2006–07	League One	7	0	2	0	—		1 (Note: Appearance(s) in Football League Trophy)	0	10	0
Leeds United (loan)	2008–09	League One	7	0	—		—		0	0	7	0
Barnsley (loan)	2009–10	Championship	28	1	1	0	0	0	—		29	1
Portsmouth (loan)	2010–11	Championship	36	0	1	0	2	0	—		39	0
Watford	2011–12	Championship	39	2	1	0	1	0	—		41	2
Watford	2012–13	Championship	4	0	0	0	2	0	—		6	0
Watford	Total		43	2	1	0	3	0	0	0	47	2
Portsmouth (loan)	2012–13	League One	6	0	0	0	—		0	0	6	0
Coventry City (loan)	2012–13	League One	6	0	—		—		1	0	7	0
Port Vale	2013–14	League One	40	0	4	0	1	0	2	0	47	0
Port Vale	2014–15	League One	43	1	0	0	2	0	1	0	46	1
Port Vale	2015–16	League One	44	3	2	0	2	0	2	0	50	3
Port Vale	Total		127	4	6	0	5	0	5	0	143	4
Notts County	2016–17	League Two	34	0	3	0	1	0	2 (Note: Appearances in EFL Trophy)	0	40	0
Notts County	2017–18	League Two	25	1	4	0	1	0	2	0	32	1
Notts County	Total		59	1	7	0	2	0	4	0	72	1
Yeovil Town	2018–19	League Two	33	2	1	0	1	0	2	0	37	2
Yeovil Town	2019–20	National League	27	0	0	0	—		3 (Note: Two appearances in FA Trophy, one appearance in National League play-offs)	0	30	0
Yeovil Town	2020–21	National League	34	0	3	0	—		0	0	37	0
Yeovil Town	Total		94	2	4	0	1	0	5	0	104	2
Hanley Town	2021–22	Midland League; Premier Division	31	5	5	2	—		2 (Note: Two appearances in FA Vase)	0	38	7
Hanley Town	2022–23	Northern Premier League; Division One West	7	2	7	1	—		0	0	14	3
Hanley Town	Total		38	7	12	3	—		2	0	52	10
Stratford Town	2022–23	Southern League; Premier Division Central	8	1	0	0	—		1 (Note: One appearance in Birmingham Senior Cup)	0	9	1
Nantwich Town	2022–23	Northern Premier League; Premier Division	4	0	0	0	—		—		4	0
Eccleshall	2022–23	North West Counties League; Division One South	2	0	0	0	—		—		2	0
Bury	2023–24	North West Counties League; Premier Division	0	0	0	0	—		—		0	0
Congleton Town	2023–24	Midland League; Premier Division	33	6	2	0	—		7	0	42	6
Congleton Town	2024–25	Northern Premier League; Division One West	9	0	0	0	—		2 (Note: Two appearances in the play-offs)	0	11	0
Congleton Town	Total		42	6	2	0	—		9	0	53	6
Abbey Hulton United	2025–26	Midland League; Premier Division	7	0	0	0	—		4 (Note: Nompetition not specified)	0	11	0
Leek Town	2025–26	Northern Premier League; Premier Division	4	1	0	0	—		0	0	4	1
Career total			571	25	39	3	19	0	32	0	661	28

== Honours ==
=== Player ===
Stoke City

- Football League Championship second-place promotion: 2007–08

Congleton Town

- Midland League Premier Division: 2023–24
- Midland League Cup: 2024

=== Manager ===
Hanley Town

- Midland League Premier Division: 2021–22
