= Daniel Jones (footballer) =

English footballer (born 1986)

Dan Jones
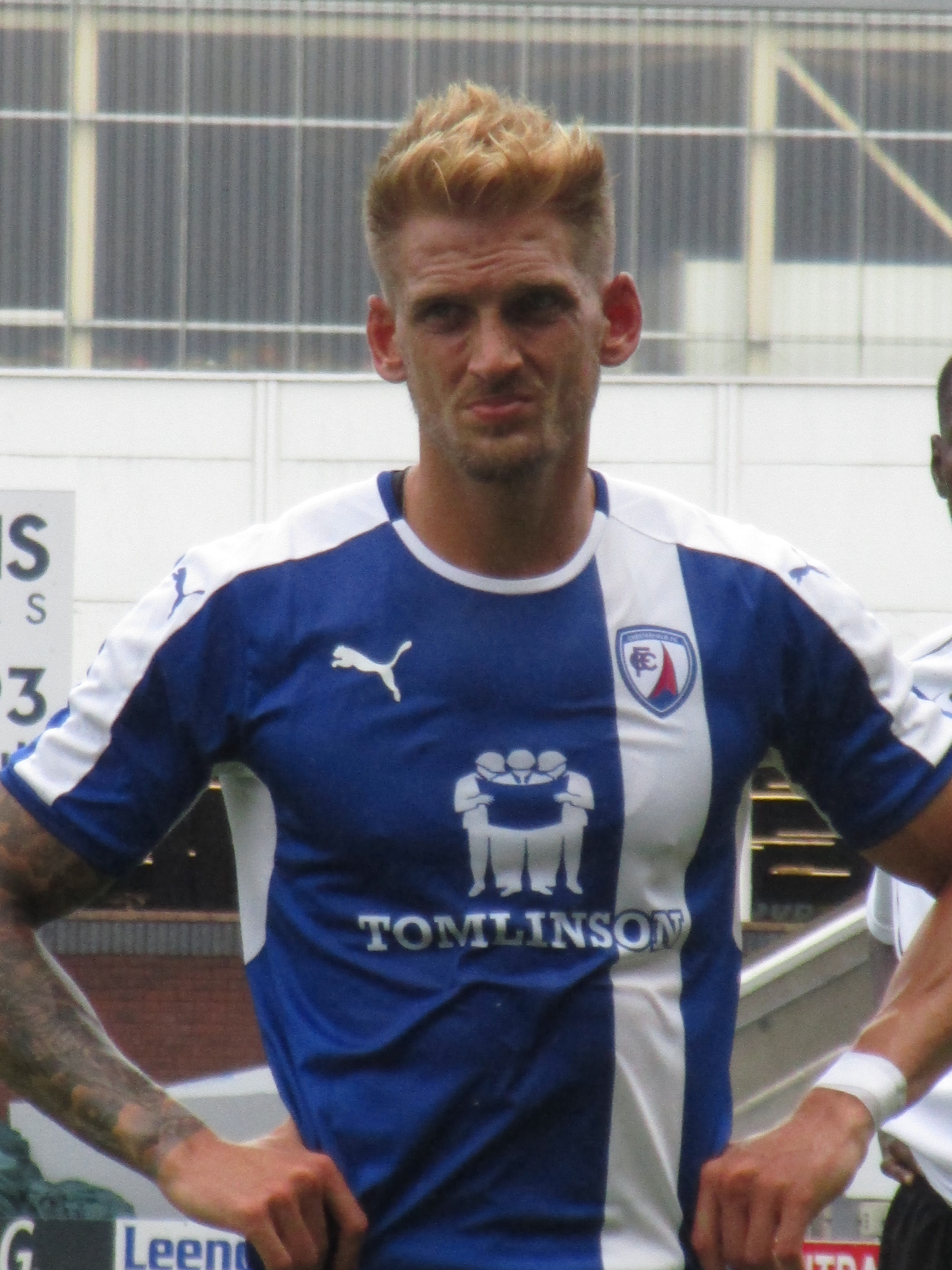
- Jones playing for Chesterfield in 2016

Personal information
- Full name: Daniel Jeffrey Jones
- Date of birth: 23 December 1986 (age 39)
- Place of birth: Rowley Regis, England
- Height: 1.88 m (6 ft 2 in)
- Positions: Left-back; left wing

Youth career
- 1997–2005: Wolverhampton Wanderers

Senior career*
Years	Team	Apps	(Gls)
2005–2010	Wolverhampton Wanderers	10	(0)
2007–2008	→ Northampton Town (loan)	33	(3)
2008	→ Oldham Athletic (loan)	12	(1)
2009	→ Oldham Athletic (loan)	11	(0)
2009	→ Notts County (loan)	7	(0)
2010	→ Bristol Rovers (loan)	17	(0)
2010–2013	Sheffield Wednesday	37	(0)
2013–2014	Port Vale	36	(1)
2014–2017	Chesterfield	66	(1)
2017–2019	Notts County	40	(5)
2019–2020	Cambridge United	14	(0)
2020	→ Solihull Moors (loan)	0	(0)
2020–2021	Hereford	9	(0)
2021	Bray Wanderers	11	(0)
2022	Longford Town	0	(0)
Total		303	(11)
- * Club domestic league appearances and goals

Daniel Jeffrey Jones (born 23 December 1986) is an English former footballer. He played as a left-back or on the left side of midfield.

He began his career at Wolverhampton Wanderers, turning professional in January 2005 after a long association as a youth team prospect. He was loaned out to Northampton Town, Oldham Athletic, Notts County and Bristol Rovers, but never won a regular first-team place at Wolves. He made a permanent move to Sheffield Wednesday in June 2010 and was a squad member as the "Owls" were promoted out of League One in 2011–12. He joined Port Vale in January 2013 and helped the club to secure promotion out of League Two in 2012–13. He left the club in April 2014 after a training ground bust-up and signed with Chesterfield the following month. After three years with Chesterfield, he joined Notts County in July 2017. He left County after the club were relegated out of the Football League and went on to sign for Cambridge United in July 2019. He was loaned out to Solihull Moors in March 2020 and signed with Hereford four months later. He moved to the League of Ireland First Division after signing for Bray Wanderers in July 2021, before moving to Longford Town in December 2021.

== Career ==
=== Wolverhampton Wanderers ===
Born in Rowley Regis, West Midlands, Jones joined the Wolverhampton Wanderers academy at the age of ten and moved up through the ranks to sign his first professional contract at Molineux under Glenn Hoddle in January 2005. He made his first-team debut on 1 April 2006, in a 2–0 defeat to Plymouth Argyle at Home Park; he was replaced by Rob Edwards on 62 minutes. He played eight Championship games in the 2006–07 season, though only played one of these games from December onwards.

In August 2007, he joined League One club Northampton Town on loan, with manager Stuart Gray already aware of Jones from his time as a coach at Wolves. He scored his first goal in the English Football League on 15 December, in a 2–2 draw with Nottingham Forest at the City Ground. He claimed another goal six days later, in a 4–1 win over AFC Bournemouth. He had his loan deal extended until 25 January. Wolves boss Mick McCarthy agreed to the loan extension despite being keen to see the youngster's progress for himself. He scored his third career goal on 19 January, converting a 25 yards (23 m) direct free kick in a 1–0 win over Gillingham at the Priestfield Stadium. He returned to his parent club after this spell but after managing just one substitute appearance for Wolves, he was allowed to return on loan to Sixfields in March 2008 until the end of the 2007–08 season. He made a total of 39 league and cup appearances for the "Cobblers".

Jones joined League One side Oldham Athletic on a one-month loan in October 2008 after signing a new two-year contract with Wolves. He scored on his debut to help John Sheridan's "Latics" to a 4–0 victory over Hereford United at Boundary Park. His loan was subsequently extended to run until 3 January, but he returned to Wolves with a knee injury a week early. Once recovered, he again returned to Oldham on loan in February. Including both spells in the 2008–09 season, Jones played 25 games for Oldham.

Jones joined League Two club Notts County on loan in September 2009 with a view to a permanent move when the transfer window reopened in January. In December, confirmation came that the deal would be made permanent, however, he left Meadow Lane and returned to Wolves the following month, having played just eight games for Steve Cotterill's "Magpies". In February 2010, he signed for Bristol Rovers on an initial one-month loan, as "Pirates" manager Paul Trollope needed cover for the left-back spot. The loan deal was subsequently extended until the end of the 2009–10 season. After it was announced that he would not be offered a new deal at Wolves, Jones said that he was considering a return to the Memorial Stadium though wanted to keep his options open. Trollope was quoted as being "very much hopeful" of signing Jones after "detailed discussions" were held.

=== Sheffield Wednesday ===
Jones signed a three-year deal with League One side Sheffield Wednesday in June 2010. He played 34 games in the 2010–11 campaign, as a poor season meant that manager Alan Irvine was replaced by Gary Megson at the half-way stage. Jones struggled with an ankle injury at the start of the 2011–12 season, and was then sidelined with a calf injury in February. Promotion out of League One was secure largely in his absence. A first-team place at Hillsborough proved to be out of reach as Wednesday struggled to survive in the Championship in the 2012–13 season under the stewardship of new boss Dave Jones. Searching for first-team football elsewhere, he left Wednesday by mutual consent on 17 January 2013.

=== Port Vale ===
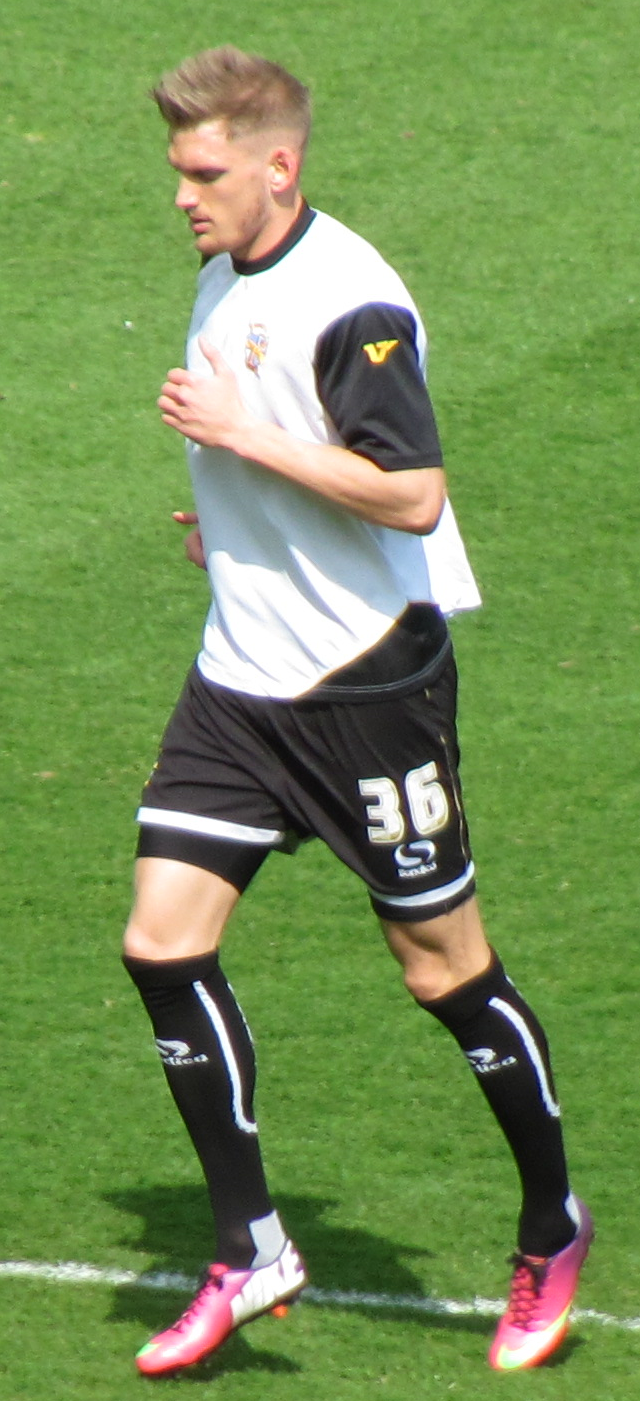
Jones warming up for Port Vale before the match against Northampton Town on 20 April 2013.

Only hours after his release by Sheffield Wednesday was announced, Jones agreed to join League Two leaders Port Vale on a short-term deal until the end of the 2012–13 season. He scored on his debut with "a stunning long-range effort" in a 2–2 draw with AFC Wimbledon at Kingsmeadow on 24 January. Vale were promoted at the end of the season, with Jones making 16 appearances. He signed a new two-year contract in the summer, citing manager Micky Adams' attacking philosophy to extend his stay at the club.

He started the 2013–14 season in the first XI, but had to fight for his place after missing with a groin strain. He picked up the club's first red card of the season on 19 October, when he was dismissed for two bookable offences 20 minutes into a 2–1 defeat to Sheffield United at Bramall Lane. Two months later he was sidelined for several weeks after picking up a foot injury. He returned to the first-team on the left side of midfield in February. On 14 April 2014, Jones was sacked by Port Vale following a training ground bust-up that left club captain Doug Loft with a facial injury.

=== Chesterfield ===
On 15 May 2014, Jones signed a two-contract year with newly promoted League One side Chesterfield as manager Paul Cook's first signing of the 2014–15 season. On 4 October he was fouled by Sheffield United's Michael Higdon, who was sent off for the challenge. However, Jones was ridiculed for his "fish out of water" reaction. Jones himself was sent off on 29 November, after getting involved with a fight during a 1–1 draw at Crawley Town. He helped the "Spireites" to the play-offs, where they were beaten by Preston North End at the semi-final stage.

Jones suffered a fractured ankle after "pushing and turning at the same time" during Chesterfield's match 4–0 defeat to Swindon Town on 28 November 2015. A setback of the injury meant that he was kept him out of action for nine months, before he returned in Chesterfield's 3–1 victory over Swindon on 13 August 2016. However, he was then forced to miss another six months with a re-occurrence of the same injury, before managing a return to fitness in the Chesterfield's 1–0 defeat to Oldham Athletic on 4 February 2017. He remained in and out of the side. He was released by manager Gary Caldwell following the club's relegation to League Two at the end of the season.

=== Notts County ===
Jones signed an undisclosed contract with League Two side Notts County in July 2017. Manager Kevin Nolan said that "we have added another quality player to what is already a promising squad". On 9 September, he scored his first goal for the club in a 2–0 home win over Morecambe, and was described by Nolan as on "another level". Speaking the following month, Jones said that he was enjoying the competition for the left-back spot with Carl Dickinson. He signed a new two-year contract by Notts County at the end of the 2017–18 season, whilst Dickinson was released.

On 1 September 2018, he was sent off for committing a two-footed challenge on Lloyd James in a 3–1 home defeat to Forest Green Rovers; new manager Harry Kewell watched the game from the stands. Notts County released him at the end of the 2018–19 season.

=== Cambridge United ===
On 19 July 2019, Jones signed a one-year contract with League Two club Cambridge United after a successful trial spell. The "U's" had been in search of a new left-back following the departure of Jake Carroll to Motherwell and manager Colin Calderwood felt that Jones had settled in at the Abbey Stadium better than the other trialist left-backs. However, he missed three months of the start of the 2019–20 season with a broken foot. On 9 March, Mark Bonner replaced Calderwood as manager, and just two days later a loan deal was arranged for Jones with National League club Solihull Moors. However, he was unable to feature for the Moors due to the COVID-19 pandemic in England, and on 29 April Cambridge announced that Jones would be one of nine players to be released by the club at the end of the season.

=== Hereford ===
On 14 July 2020, Jones joined National League North club Hereford after being approached by player-manager Josh Gowling. On 23 February 2021, Jones was released from his contract to allow him to move closer to his family.

=== League of Ireland ===
In July 2021, Jones signed for Bray Wanderers of the League of Ireland First Division. Ahead of the 2022 season, Jones moved from Bray to fellow First Division side Longford Town.

== Style of play ==
Speaking in January 2013, former Sheffield Wednesday teammate Anthony Gardner described Jones as a "strong, tall, very athletic" player possessing "a great left foot" and a "great engine" who is "quick" and "good both defensively and in attack".

== Personal life ==
Jones has been a Wolverhampton Wanderers supporter since childhood.

== Career statistics ==
Appearances and goals by club, season and competition
Club	Season	League			National cup (Note: Includes FA Cup, FAI Cup)		League cup (Note: Includes Football League Cup, League of Ireland Cup)		Other		Total	
Club	Season	Division	Apps	Goals	Apps	Goals	Apps	Goals	Apps	Goals	Apps	Goals
Wolverhampton Wanderers	2005–06	Championship	1	0	0	0	0	0	—		1	0
Wolverhampton Wanderers	2006–07	Championship	8	0	0	0	0	0	—		8	0
Wolverhampton Wanderers	2007–08	Championship	1	0	0	0	0	0	—		1	0
Wolverhampton Wanderers	2008–09	Championship	0	0	0	0	1	0	—		1	0
Wolverhampton Wanderers	2009–10	Premier League	0	0	0	0	0	0	—		0	0
Wolverhampton Wanderers	Total		10	0	0	0	1	0	0	0	11	0
Northampton Town (loan)	2007–08	League One	33	3	3	0	2	0	1 (Note: Appearance(s) in the Football League Trophy / EFL Trophy.)	0	39	3
Oldham Athletic (loan)	2008–09	League One	23	1	2	0	—		—		25	1
Notts County (loan)	2009–10	League Two	7	0	0	0	—		1	0	8	0
Bristol Rovers (loan)	2009–10	League One	17	0	—		—		—		17	0
Sheffield Wednesday	2010–11	League One	25	0	4	0	2	0	3	0	34	0
Sheffield Wednesday	2011–12	League One	3	0	1	0	1	0	0	0	5	0
Sheffield Wednesday	2012–13	Championship	9	0	0	0	2	0	—		11	0
Sheffield Wednesday	Total		37	0	5	0	5	0	3	0	50	0
Port Vale	2012–13	League Two	16	1	—		—		—		16	1
Port Vale	2013–14	League One	20	0	0	0	1	0	1	0	22	0
Port Vale	Total		36	1	0	0	1	0	1	0	38	1
Chesterfield	2014–15	League One	33	0	3	0	1	0	3 (Note: 1 appearance in the Football League Trophy and 2 appearances in the play-offs.)	0	40	0
Chesterfield	2015–16	League One	19	1	1	0	1	0	1	0	22	1
Chesterfield	2016–17	League One	14	0	0	0	0	0	0	0	14	0
Chesterfield	Total		66	1	4	0	2	0	4	0	76	1
Notts County	2017–18	League Two	27	4	2	0	0	0	4 (Note: 2 appearances in the EFL Trophy and 2 appearances in the play-offs)	0	33	4
Notts County	2018–19	League Two	13	1	1	0	1	0	3	0	18	1
Notts County	Total		40	5	3	0	1	0	7	0	51	5
Cambridge United	2019–20	League Two	14	0	2	0	1	0	2	0	19	0
Solihull Moors (loan)	2019–20	National League	0	0	0	0	—		0	0	0	0
Hereford	2020–21	National League North	9	0	0	0	—		2 (Note: Appearances in the FA Trophy.)	0	11	0
Bray Wanderers	2021	League of Ireland; First Division	11	0	1	0	0	0	2 (Note: Appearances in the 2021 League of Ireland promotion/relegation playoffs)	0	14	0
Longford Town	2022	League of Ireland; First Division	0	0	0	0	0	0	0	0	0	0
Career total			303	11	20	0	13	0	23	0	359	11

== Honours ==
Sheffield Wednesday

- Football League One second-place promotion: 2011–12

Port Vale

- Football League Two third-place promotion: 2012–13
