= Noor Husin =

Afghan footballer

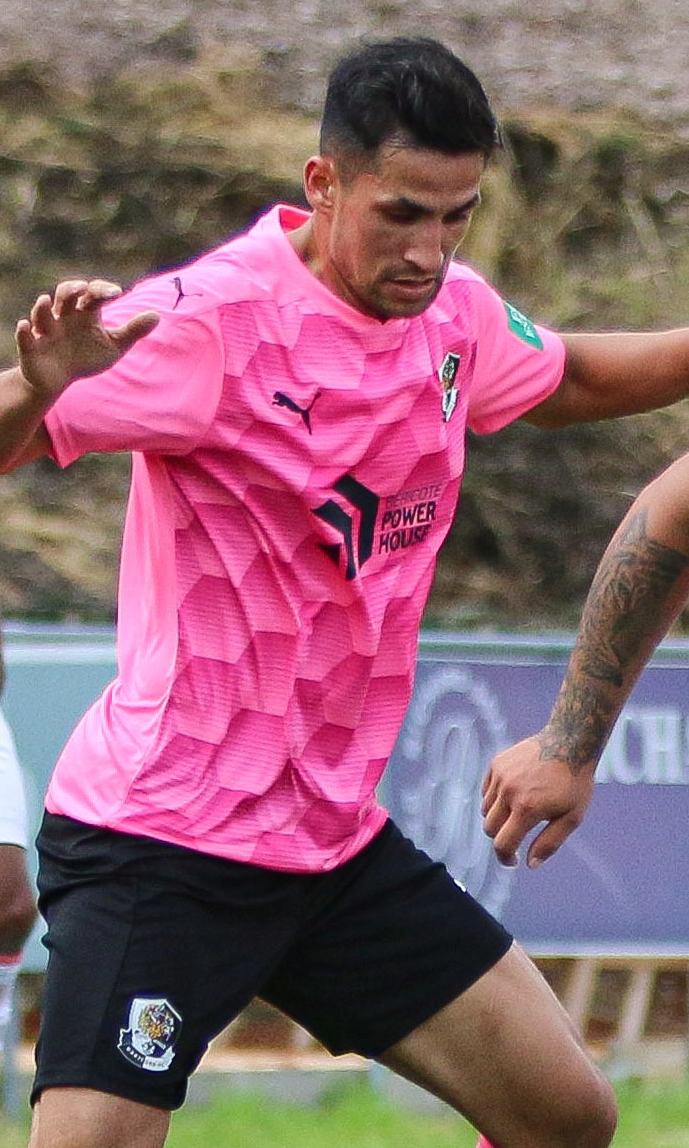
- Husin playing for Dartford in August 2021

Personal information
- Full name: Noor Husin
- Date of birth: 3 March 1997 (age 29)
- Place of birth: Mazar-i-Sharif, Afghanistan
- Height: 1.77 m (5 ft 10 in)
- Position: Midfielder

Team information
- Current team: Worthing
- Number: 8

Youth career
- –2015: Reading

Senior career*
Years	Team	Apps	(Gls)
2015–2016	Reading	0	(0)
2015–2016	→ Hemel Hempstead Town (loan)	7	(3)
2016–2018	Crystal Palace	0	(0)
2017	→ Accrington Stanley (loan)	11	(1)
2018–2019	Notts County	26	(1)
2019–2020	Stevenage	10	(0)
2020–2022	Dartford	37	(5)
2022–2026	Southend United	138	(8)
2026–	Worthing	0	(0)

International career^{‡}
2019–	Afghanistan	20	(0)
- * Club domestic league appearances and goals as of 17:10, 27 May 2026 (UTC) ‡ National team caps and goals as of 17:10, 18 October 2023 (UTC)

Noor Husin (Dari: نور حسین; born 3 March 1997) is an Afghan footballer who plays as a central midfielder or defensive midfielder for National League club Worthing and the Afghanistan national football team.

== Early and personal life ==
Husin was born in Mazar-i-Sharif. His family moved to England when he was aged 5, to escape war. His father came to England first as a refugee, followed by the rest of the family, who settled in Croydon.

== Club career ==
=== Reading ===
He began playing football at Reading's academy.

In mid October 2015, Husin joined Hemel Hempstead Town. He made his competitive debut for Hemel Hempstead on 17 October 2015 in a 2–2 away draw with Dartford. He scored his first competitive goal in that game as well, scoring in the 41st minute. He returned to Reading in early January 2016. At the end of the 2015–16 season, Reading announced that Husin would leave the club.

=== Crystal Palace ===
Following his release from Reading, Husin joined Crystal Palace in the summer of 2016.

On 31 January 2017, Husin joined League Two side Accrington Stanley on loan for the remainder of the season, scoring on his debut against Notts County on 4 February 2017.

=== Notts County ===
On 12 January 2018, Husin joined League Two side Notts County from Crystal Palace on an 18-month contract. He made his competitive debut for the club on 20 January 2018 in a 2–1 away defeat to Exeter City. In doing so he became the first Afghan to play in the English Football League.

On 3 February 2018, Husin scored his first goal for Notts County in a 4–1 win vs Crewe Alexandra. He was released by Notts County at the end of the 2018–19 season.

=== Stevenage ===
On 1 August 2019, Husin joined League Two side Stevenage on a free transfer.

=== Dartford ===
On 22 February 2020, Husin joined Dartford.

=== Southend United ===
On 21 January 2022, Husin joined National League side Southend United.

Husin scored his first goal for Southend United on his third appearance in a 1–0 away win over Dover Athletic. In January 2024 he was linked to a move to Colchester United.

In September 2025, Husin suffered an anterior cruciate ligament injury. Having failed to make another appearance, he departed the club upon the expiry of his contract at the end of the 2025–26 season.

=== Worthing ===
On 27 May 2026, Husin agreed to join newly promoted National League club Worthing.

== International career ==
Husin made his senior International debut for Afghanistan in December 2018. He played his first FIFA-approved game for Afghanistan on 20 March 2019 in a friendly against Oman.

== Career statistics ==
=== Club ===
As of match played 6 September 2025

Appearances and goals by club, season and competition
Club	Season	League			FA Cup		EFL Cup		Other		Total	
Club	Season	Division	Apps	Goals	Apps	Goals	Apps	Goals	Apps	Goals	Apps	Goals
Reading	2015–16	Championship	0	0	0	0	0	0	—		0	0
Hemel Hempstead Town (loan)	2015–16	National League South	7	3	0	0	—		1 (Note: One appearance in the FA Trophy)	0	8	3
Crystal Palace	2016–17	Premier League	0	0	0	0	0	0	—		0	0
Crystal Palace	2017–18	Premier League	0	0	0	0	0	0	—		0	0
Accrington Stanley (loan)	2016–17	League Two	11	1	—		—		—		11	1
Notts County	2017–18	League Two	12	1	2	1	—		0	0	14	2
Notts County	2018–19	League Two	14	0	0	0	1	0	3 (Note: Three appearances in the EFL Trophy)	0	18	0
Notts County	Total		26	1	2	1	1	0	3	0	32	2
Stevenage	2019–20	League Two	10	0	0	0	1	0	1 (Note: One appearance in the EFL Trophy)	0	12	0
Dartford	2019–20	National League South	4	1	—		—		4 (Note: One appearance in the Kent Senior Cup, three appearances in the National League South play-offs)	0	8	1
Dartford	2020–21	National League South	15	1	1	0	—		1 (Note: One appearance in the FA Trophy)	0	17	1
Dartford	2021–22	National League South	18	3	3	1	—		4 (Note: One appearance in the Kent Senior Cup, three appearances in the FA Trophy)	0	25	4
Dartford	Total		37	5	4	1	0	0	9	0	50	6
Southend United	2021–22	National League	17	2	—		—		—		17	2
Southend United	2022–23	National League	31	1	1	0	—		3 (Note: Three appearances in the FA Trophy)	1	35	2
Southend United	2023–24	National League	41	4	0	0	—		1 (Note: One appearance in the FA Trophy)	0	42	4
Southend United	2024–25	National League	43	1	2	0	—		4 (Note: One appearance in the FA Trophy, three appearances in the National League play-offs)	0	49	1
Southend United	2025–26	National League	6	0	0	0	—		0	0	6	0
Southend United	Total		138	8	3	0	0	0	8	1	149	9
Career total			229	18	9	2	2	0	22	1	262	21

=== International ===
As of 17 October 2022

Afghanistan
Year	Apps	Goals
2019	8	0
2020	0	0
2021	6	0
2022	4	0
2023	2	0
Total	20	0

== Honours ==
Dartford

- Kent Senior Cup: 2019–20

Southend United

- FA Trophy: 2025–26
