= 2009–10 Wolverhampton Wanderers F.C. season =

English football club season

Wolverhampton Wanderers
2009–10 season
- Chairman: Steve Morgan
- Manager: Mick McCarthy
- Premier League: 15th
- FA Cup: 4th round
- League Cup: 3rd round
- Top goalscorer: League: Kevin Doyle (9); All: Kevin Doyle (9)
- Highest home attendance: 29,023 (vs Portsmouth, 3 October 2009)
- Lowest home attendance: 11,416 (vs Swindon, 25 August 2009)
- Average home league attendance: 28,366
Home colours	Away colours

The 2009–10 season was the 111th season of competitive league football in the history of English football club Wolverhampton Wanderers. This season saw the club return to the Premier League after a five-year absence. They had won promotion in the previous season as champions of the Football League Championship.

Although this season was the club's 61st at the top level of English football, it was only their second season in the modern Premier League; their only previous Premier League campaign had ended in relegation in 2003–04.

The club avoided relegation, finishing 15th, some eight points clear of the relegation zone. Survival was confirmed with two games to spare, marking the first time they had avoided relegation from the highest level since 1980–81.

== Season review ==
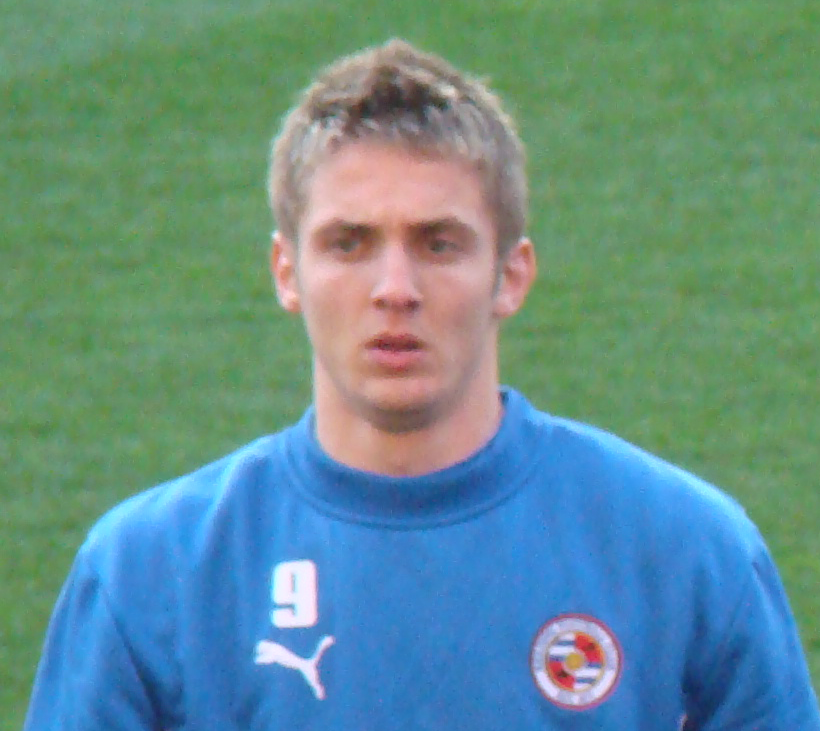
Kevin Doyle became Wolves' record signing when he joined from Reading.

The summer transfer window saw the arrival of nine new recruits in total (seven permanent, two loans) at a cost of £18.5 million. The most notable new addition was Irish international striker Kevin Doyle, signed for a club record fee of £6.5 million from Championship side Reading. Serbian midfielder Nenad Milijaš was the next most expensive signing, bought to add additional creativity. The summer also saw contract extensions signed by Kevin Foley, Sylvan Ebanks-Blake, Jody Craddock and David Edwards. On the field the players resumed training at their Sir Jack Hayward training ground on 29 June 2009, before flying out to Perth, Australia on 4 July for a two-week stay where they stepped up their training and played their first two games of pre-season. Preparations were completed with the only home friendly, a game against La Liga side Real Valladolid.

The season proper began with a 0–2 loss to West Ham United in the club's first Premier League fixture in five years. Wolves immediately bounced back by winning on the road at Wigan despite a long injury list, giving the club their first ever away win in the modern Premier League.

A further victory against Fulham put them 12th after six games, but this was their last victory for almost two months - a run which included a home loss to winless Portsmouth. Despite credible draws against the likes of Everton and Aston Villa, the team fell into the relegation zone with a defence unable to keep clean sheets. Heavy defeats followed against "Big 4" sides Arsenal and Chelsea, before a lacklustre home loss to local rivals Birmingham City put manager McCarthy under increasing pressure.

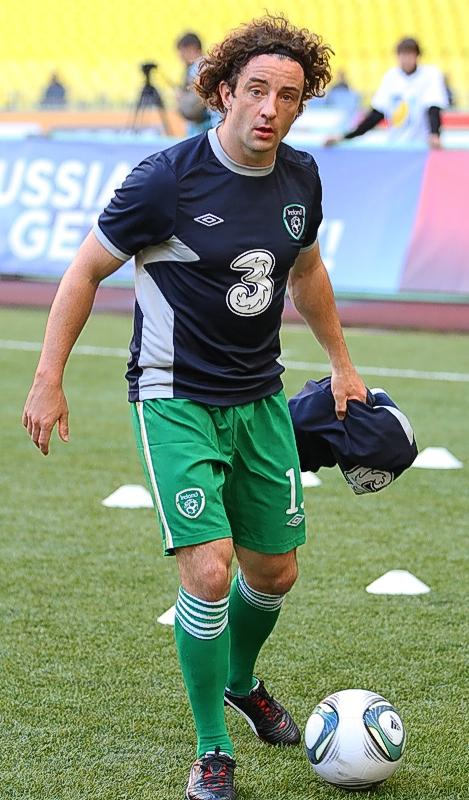
Stephen Hunt was pursued without success in the January transfer window.

December saw a change of fortune with three wins in four games, including a surprise away success at Tottenham, to help propel the club out of the mire. The month also brought controversy though after manager Mick McCarthy opted to field an entirely new outfield line-up to the one that defeated Spurs when they visited Manchester United three days later. The uproar caused by the decision led to the Premier League requesting an official explanation from the club, resulting in a £25,000 suspended fine. 2009 closed with two successive defeats to Liverpool and Manchester City, but enough points to remain above the relegation zone.

The January transfer window saw the club make a club record bid to sign winger Adam Johnson from Middlesbrough, and a long-winded attempt to lure Stephen Hunt from relegation rivals Hull City. Both bids failed, as did late attempts for young defender Nathaniel Clyne and even a loan offer to former starlet Robbie Keane. With no permanent transfers agreed, the club instead brought in two loan signings, both from Belgian club Charleroi – Adlène Guedioura and Geoffrey Mujangi Bia.

The start to 2010 proved equally frustrating on the field with only two points taken from four games, as well as a convincing FA Cup exit at the hands of financially troubled Championship side Crystal Palace. The rot was stopped with a home win over Tottenham, which meant Wolves had completed their first top flight double since the 1980–81 season. Wolves added a second double over Burnley, before a draw at Aston Villa and then a 3–1 victory at fellow strugglers West Ham finished a series of three away game which yielded seven points from a possible nine, giving their chances of avoiding relegation a strong boost.

The team drew four of their five following games, their only defeat coming in the 95th minute away at title challengers Arsenal. This run of points helped assure their Premier League survival. Survival was mathematically confirmed on 25 April 2010 when Burnley failed to beat Liverpool, thus filling the final relegation spot.

The season was concluded with a 1–3 loss at already-relegated Portsmouth before a final day victory over Sunderland took their points tally to 38, yielding a 15th-place finish. This marked their highest position in the English football system since 1979–80. It also meant the club had survived at the top level for the first time in 29 years. Although they finished the division's lowest goalscorers (with 32), a strong defensive resolve meant they had conceded the least of the bottom 8 (56), creating the formula for their survival.

== Results ==
=== Preseason ===
Wolves took part in their first foreign pre-season tour in five years as they traveled to Perth, Australia to train and play their opening two friendlies against A-League opposition in their first visit to the country since 1972. As had become common in recent years, only their final game was held at their Molineux home. A second "Wolves XI" team largely comprising academy prospects and out of favour senior players also played a series of matches during this period.

10 July 2009	Perth Glory	0–1	Wolverhampton Wanderers	Perth, Australia
12:30 BST		Report	Ebanks-Blake 2'	Stadium: Perth Oval; Attendance: 11,083; Referee: Craig Zetter

15 July 2009	North Queensland Fury	1–2	Wolverhampton Wanderers	Perth, Australia
10:15 BST	Fowler 67' (pen.)	Report	Keogh 2'; Craddock 74'	Stadium: Perth Oval; Attendance: 14,903; Referee: Peter Green

21 July 2009	Walsall	0–1	Wolverhampton Wanderers	Walsall
19:45 BST		Report	Surman 16'	Stadium: Banks's Stadium; Attendance: 5,867; Referee: Kevin Friend

25 July 2009	Bristol City	2–0	Wolverhampton Wanderers	Bristol
15:00 BST	Haynes 33'; Maynard 38'	Report		Stadium: Ashton Gate; Attendance: 4,777; Referee: Kevin Friend

28 July 2009	Milton Keynes Dons	1–0	Wolverhampton Wanderers	Milton Keynes
19:45 BST	Easter 39'	Report		Stadium: Stadium:mk; Attendance: 7,775; Referee: Dean Whitestone

1 August 2009	Doncaster Rovers	1–1	Wolverhampton Wanderers	Doncaster
15:00 BST	Wilson 49'	Report	Jarvis 64'	Stadium: Keepmoat Stadium; Attendance: 2,912; Referee: Uriah Rennie

4 August 2009	Scunthorpe United	2–4	Wolverhampton Wanderers	Scunthorpe
19:45 BST	Hurst 39'; McCann 47'	Report	Friend 16'; Keogh 44'; Halford 63', 86'	Stadium: Glanford Park; Attendance: 2,143; Referee: Jon Moss

8 August 2009	Wolverhampton Wanderers	0–2	Real Valladolid	Wolverhampton
15:00 BST		Report	Medunjanin 29'; Asier 88'	Stadium: Molineux; Attendance: 10,513; Referee: Mark Clattenburg

"Wolves XI" pre season results (all away): 0–0 vs Kidderminster Harriers (18 July), 1–2 vs Port Vale (22 July), 0–0 vs Hereford United (25 July), 1–0 vs Crewe Alexandra (29 July), 3–1 vs Wrexham (5 August)

=== Premier League ===
A total of 20 teams competed in the Premier League in the 2009–10 season. Each team would play every other team twice, once at their stadium, and once at the opposition's. Three points were awarded to teams for each win, one point per draw, and none for defeats. The provisional fixture list was released on 17 June 2009, but was subject to change in the event of matches being selected for television coverage.

15 August 2009 1	Wolverhampton Wanderers	0–2	West Ham United	Wolverhampton
15:00 BST		Report	Noble 22'; Upson 69'	Stadium: Molineux; Attendance: 28,674 (2,600 away fans); Referee: Chris Foy

18 August 2009 2	Wigan Athletic	0–1	Wolverhampton Wanderers	Wigan
19:45 BST		Report	Keogh 6'	Stadium: DW Stadium; Attendance: 16,661 (4,174 away fans); Referee: Mike Jones

22 August 2009 3	Manchester City	1–0	Wolverhampton Wanderers	Manchester
15:00 BST	Adebayor 17'	Report		Stadium: City of Manchester Stadium; Attendance: 47,287 (2,800 away fans); Referee: Lee Mason

29 August 2009 4	Wolverhampton Wanderers	1–1	Hull City	Wolverhampton
15:00 BST	Stearman 46'	Report	Geovanni 3'	Stadium: Molineux; Attendance: 27,906 (1,500 away fans); Referee: Stuart Attwell

12 September 2009 5	Blackburn Rovers	3–1	Wolverhampton Wanderers	Blackburn
15:00 BST	Diouf 10'; Roberts 56'; Dunn 64'	Report	Maierhofer 88'	Stadium: Ewood Park; Attendance: 24,845 (3,000 away fans); Referee: Steve Bennett

20 September 2009 6	Wolverhampton Wanderers	2–1	Fulham	Wolverhampton
14:00 BST	Doyle 18'; Edwards 50'	Report	Murphy 66' (pen.)	Stadium: Molineux; Attendance: 27,670 (448 away fans); Referee: Kevin Friend

27 September 2009 7	Sunderland	5–2	Wolverhampton Wanderers	Sunderland
16:00 BST	Bent 9' (pen.); Jones 48' (pen.), 70'; Turner 73'; Mancienne 90+1' (o.g.)	Report	Mensah 50' (o.g.); Doyle 55'	Stadium: Stadium of Light; Attendance: 37,566 (1,514 away fans); Referee: Lee Mason

3 October 2009 8	Wolverhampton Wanderers	0–1	Portsmouth	Wolverhampton
15:00 BST		Report	Yebda 19'	Stadium: Molineux; Attendance: 29,023 (1,500 away fans); Referee: Howard Webb

17 October 2009 9	Everton	1–1	Wolverhampton Wanderers	Liverpool
15:00 BST	Bilyaletdinov 88'	Report	Doyle 76'	Stadium: Goodison Park; Attendance: 39,319 (3,000 away fans); Referee: Stuart Attwell

24 October 2009 10	Wolverhampton Wanderers	1–1	Aston Villa	Wolverhampton
12:45 BST	Ebanks-Blake 83' (pen.)	Report	Agbonlahor 79'	Stadium: Molineux; Attendance: 28,734 (2,600 away fans); Referee: Peter Walton

31 October 2009 11	Stoke City	2–2	Wolverhampton Wanderers	Stoke-on-Trent
15:00 GMT	Elokobi 17' (o.g.); Etherington 44'	Report	Craddock 47', 64'	Stadium: Britannia Stadium; Attendance: 27,500 (2,800 away fans); Referee: Chris Foy

7 November 2009 12	Wolverhampton Wanderers	1–4	Arsenal	Wolverhampton
17:30 GMT	Craddock 89'	Report	Zubar 28' (o.g.); Craddock 36' (o.g.); Fàbregas 45+1'; Arshavin 66'	Stadium: Molineux; Attendance: 28,937 (2,600 away fans); Referee: Steve Bennett

21 November 2009 13	Chelsea	4–0	Wolverhampton Wanderers	London
15:00 GMT	Malouda 5'; Essien 12', 22'; J. Cole 56'	Report		Stadium: Stamford Bridge; Attendance: 41,786 (3,000 away fans); Referee: Lee Mason

29 November 2009 14	Wolverhampton Wanderers	0–1	Birmingham City	Wolverhampton
12:00 GMT		Report	Bowyer 3'	Stadium: Molineux; Attendance: 26,668 (2,421 away fans); Referee: Mark Clattenburg

5 December 2009 15	Wolverhampton Wanderers	2–1	Bolton Wanderers	Wolverhampton
15:00 GMT	Craddock 3'; Milijaš 63'	Report	Elmander 79'	Stadium: Molineux; Attendance: 27,362 (1,002 away fans); Referee: Chris Foy

12 December 2009 16	Tottenham Hotspur	0–1	Wolverhampton Wanderers	London
15:00 GMT		Report	Doyle 3'	Stadium: White Hart Lane; Attendance: 36,012 (2,900 away fans); Referee: Stuart Attwell

15 December 2009 17	Manchester United	3–0	Wolverhampton Wanderers	Manchester
20:00 GMT	Rooney 30' (pen.); Vidić 43'; Valencia 66'	Report		Stadium: Old Trafford; Attendance: 73,709 (2,530 away fans); Referee: Steve Bennett

20 December 2009 18	Wolverhampton Wanderers	2–0	Burnley	Wolverhampton
13:30 GMT	Milijaš 15'; Doyle 50'	Report		Stadium: Molineux; Attendance: 27,410 (1,296 away fans); Referee: Martin Atkinson

26 December 2009 19	Liverpool	2–0	Wolverhampton Wanderers	Liverpool
17:30 GMT	Gerrard 62'; Benayoun 70'	Report		Stadium: Anfield; Attendance: 41,956 (3,000 away fans); Referee: Andre Marriner

28 December 2009 20	Wolverhampton Wanderers	0–3	Manchester City	Wolverhampton
19:45 GMT		Report	Tevez 33', 86'; Garrido 69'	Stadium: Molineux; Attendance: 28,957 (2,599 away fans); Referee: Mike Jones

16 January 2010 21	Wolverhampton Wanderers	0–2	Wigan Athletic	Wolverhampton
15:00 GMT		Report	Rodallega (penalty missed) 45+2'; McCarthy 60'; N'Zogbia 73'	Stadium: Molineux; Attendance: 27,604 (984 away fans); Referee: Howard Webb

26 January 2010 22	Wolverhampton Wanderers	0–0	Liverpool	Wolverhampton
19:45 GMT		Report		Stadium: Molineux; Attendance: 28,763 (2,600 away fans); Referee: Peter Walton

30 January 2010 23	Hull City	2–2	Wolverhampton Wanderers	Hull
15:00 GMT	Vennegoor of Hesselink 11'; Hunt 52' (pen.)	Report	Gardner 49' (o.g.); Jarvis 67'	Stadium: KC Stadium; Attendance: 24,957 (2,500 away fans); Referee: Mike Dean

7 February 2010 24	Birmingham City	2–1	Wolverhampton Wanderers	Birmingham
13:30 GMT	Phillips 80', 85'	Report	Doyle 42'	Stadium: St Andrew's; Attendance: 24,165 (2,650 away fans); Referee: Lee Probert

10 February 2010 25	Wolverhampton Wanderers	1–0	Tottenham Hotspur	Wolverhampton
19:45 GMT	Jones 27'	Report		Stadium: Molineux; Attendance: 27,992 (2,599 away fans); Referee: Mark Clattenburg

20 February 2010 26	Wolverhampton Wanderers	0–2	Chelsea	Wolverhampton
15:00 GMT		Report	Drogba 40', 67'	Stadium: Molineux; Attendance: 28,978 (2,600 away fans); Referee: Kevin Friend

27 February 2010 27	Bolton Wanderers	1–0	Wolverhampton Wanderers	Bolton
15:00 GMT	Knight 45+1'	Report		Stadium: Reebok Stadium; Attendance: 21,261 (3,852 away fans); Referee: Andre Marriner

6 March 2010 28	Wolverhampton Wanderers	0–1	Manchester United	Wolverhampton
17:30 GMT		Report	Scholes 73'	Stadium: Molineux; Attendance: 28,883 (2,600 away fans); Referee: Peter Walton

13 March 2010 29	Burnley	1–2	Wolverhampton Wanderers	Burnley
15:00 GMT	Thompson 73'	Report	Jarvis 26'; Carlisle 47' (o.g.)	Stadium: Turf Moor; Attendance: 21,217 (2,300 away fans); Referee: Steve Bennett

20 March 2010 30	Aston Villa	2–2	Wolverhampton Wanderers	Birmingham
12:45 GMT	Carew 16', 82'	Report	Craddock 23'; Milner 38' (o.g.)	Stadium: Villa Park; Attendance: 37,562 (1,969 away fans); Referee: Mark Clattenburg

23 March 2010 31	West Ham United	1–3	Wolverhampton Wanderers	London
20:00 GMT	Franco 90+3'	Report	Doyle 28'; Zubar 58'; Jarvis 61'	Stadium: Upton Park; Attendance: 33,988 (1,822 away fans); Referee: Phil Dowd

27 March 2010 32	Wolverhampton Wanderers	0–0	Everton	Wolverhampton
15:00 GMT		Report		Stadium: Molineux; Attendance: 28,995 (2,600 away fans); Referee: Mike Jones

3 April 2010 33	Arsenal	1–0	Wolverhampton Wanderers	London
15:00 BST	Bendtner 90+4'	Report		Stadium: Emirates Stadium; Attendance: 60,067 (2,864 away fans); Referee: Andre Marriner

11 April 2010 34	Wolverhampton Wanderers	0–0	Stoke City	Wolverhampton
12:00 BST		Report		Stadium: Molineux; Attendance: 28,455 (2,422 away fans); Referee: Chris Foy

17 April 2010 35	Fulham	0–0	Wolverhampton Wanderers	London
15:00 BST		Report		Stadium: Craven Cottage; Attendance: 25,597 (2,900 away fans); Referee: Mike Dean

24 April 2010 36	Wolverhampton Wanderers	1–1	Blackburn Rovers	Wolverhampton
15:00 BST	Ebanks-Blake 81'	Report	Nelsen 28'	Stadium: Molineux; Attendance: 28,967 (1,317 away fans); Referee: Mark Clattenburg

1 May 2010 37	Portsmouth	3–1	Wolverhampton Wanderers	Portsmouth
15:00BST	Dindane 20'; Utaka 39'; Brown 67'	Report	Doyle 35'	Stadium: Fratton Park; Attendance: 19,213 (2,400 away fans); Referee: Mike Jones

9 May 2010 38	Wolverhampton Wanderers	2–1	Sunderland	Wolverhampton
16:00 BST	Doyle 10' (pen.); Guedioura 78'	Report	Jones 8'	Stadium: Molineux; Attendance: 28,971 (2,585 away fans); Referee: Lee Mason

Final table

Pos	Team	Pld	W	D	L	GF	GA	GD	Pts
13	Sunderland	38	11	11	16	48	56	−8	44
14	Bolton Wanderers	38	10	9	19	42	67	−25	39
15	Wolverhampton Wanderers	38	9	11	18	32	56	−24	38
16	Wigan Athletic	38	9	9	20	37	79	−42	36
17	West Ham United	38	8	11	19	47	66	−19	35

Source: Barclays Premier League

Results summary

Overall								Home						Away					
Pld	W	D	L	GF	GA	GD	Pts	W	D	L	GF	GA	GD	W	D	L	GF	GA	GD
38	9	11	18	32	56	−24	38	5	6	8	13	22	−9	4	5	10	19	34	−15

Source: Statto.com

Results by round

Round	1	2	3	4	5	6	7	8	9	10	11	12	13	14	15	16	17	18	19	20	21	22	23	24	25	26	27	28	29	30	31	32	33	34	35	36	37	38
Result	L	W	L	D	L	W	L	L	D	D	D	L	L	L	W	W	L	W	L	L	L	D	D	L	W	L	L	L	W	D	W	D	L	D	D	D	L	W
Position	16	11	13	12	15	12	16	16	14	16	16	18	19	19	18	17	18	12	15	16	16	17	17	19	15	16	17	17	17	16	15	14	14	14	15	15	15	15

Source: Statto.com
W = Win; D = Draw; L = Loss

=== FA Cup ===
3 January 2010 R3	Tranmere Rovers	0–1	Wolverhampton Wanderers	Birkenhead
18:15 GMT		Report	Jarvis 77'	Stadium: Prenton Park; Attendance: 7,476 (1,745 away fans); Referee: Lee Probert

23 January 2010 R4	Wolverhampton Wanderers	2–2	Crystal Palace	Wolverhampton
15:00 GMT	Jones 37'; Zubar 84'	Report	Lee 3'; Ambrose 49'	Stadium: Molineux; Attendance: 14,449 (1,131 away fans); Referee: Chris Foy

2 February 2010 R4 rep.	Crystal Palace	3–1	Wolverhampton Wanderers	London
19:45 GMT	Butterfield 62', 65', 68'	Report	Henry 90'	Stadium: Selhurst Park; Attendance: 10,282 (436 away fans); Referee: Lee Mason

=== League Cup ===
25 August 2009 R2	Wolverhampton Wanderers	0–0 (a.e.t.) (6–5 p)	Swindon Town	Wolverhampton
19:45 BST		Report		Stadium: Molineux; Attendance: 11,416 (1,390 away fans); Referee: Kevin Hill
	Penalties
	Surman (penalty scored); Jones (penalty scored); Edwards (penalty scored); Keogh (penalty scored); Vokes (penalty scored); Collins (penalty scored)		(penalty scored) Kennedy; (penalty scored) Marshall; (penalty scored) Easton; (penalty scored) Macklin; (penalty scored) Lucas; (penalty missed) Greer

23 September 2009 R3	Manchester United	1–0	Wolverhampton Wanderers	Manchester
20:00 BST	Welbeck 66'	Report		Stadium: Old Trafford; Attendance: 51,160 (1,407 away fans); Referee: Peter Walton

== Players ==
=== Statistics ===
Key:
‡ On loan from another club * First appearance(s) for the club

- # = Squad number
- Pos = Playing position
- P = Number of games played
- G = Number of goals scored
- GK = Goalkeeper
- DF = Defender
- MF = Midfielder
- FW = Forward
- = Yellow cards
- = Red cards
- † Permanent player left club during the season
- ¤ Loaned to another club for part or all of season

Correct as of the season's end. Starting appearances are listed first, followed by substitute appearances in parentheses where applicable.

No.	Pos	Name	P	G	P	G	P	G	P	G	A yellow card	A red card	Notes
No.	Pos	Name	League		FA Cup		League Cup		Total		Discipline		Notes
1	GK	(Wales) Wayne Hennessey	13	0	3	0	0	0	16	0	0	0	
3	DF	(Cameroon) George Elokobi	17(5)	0	1(1)	0	2	0	20(6)	0	2	0	
4	MF	(Wales) David Edwards	16(4)	1	0	0	0(1)	0	16(5)	1	3	0	
5	DF	(England) Richard Stearman	12(4)	1	2	0	0	0	14(4)	1	4	1	
6	DF	(England) Jody Craddock	33	5	2	0	1	0	36	5	1	0	
7	MF	(England) Michael Kightly	3(6)	0	0	0	1	0	4(6)	0	3	0	
8	MF	(England) Karl Henry (c)	34	0	3	1	1	0	38	1	6	1	
9	FW	(England) Sylvan Ebanks-Blake	12(11)	2	2(1)	0	1	0	15(12)	2	3	0	
10	FW	(Republic of Ireland) Andy Keogh	8(5)	1	0	0	0(2)	0	8(7)	1	4	0	
11	DF	(Republic of Ireland) Stephen Ward	18(4)	0	1(1)	0	0	0	19(5)	0	2	1	
12	MF	(England) Andrew Surman	3(4)	0	1	0	1	0	5(4)	0	0	0	
13	GK	(United States) Marcus Hahnemann	25	0	0	0	2	0	27	0	4	0	
14	MF	(England) David Jones	16(4)	1	1(1)	1	2	0	19(5)	2	3	0	
15	MF	(England) Greg Halford	12(3)	0	0(1)	0	0	0	12(4)	0	2	0	
16	DF	(Scotland) Christophe Berra	32	0	2	0	2	0	36	0	6	0	
17	MF	(England) Matt Jarvis	30(4)	3	1	1	0(1)	0	31(5)	4	3	0	
18	FW	(Wales) Sam Vokes ¤	0(5)	0	2(1)	0	1	0	3(6)	0	0	0	
19	FW	(Scotland) Chris Iwelumo ¤	2(13)	0	1(1)	0	0	0	3(14)	0	0	0	
20	MF	(Serbia) Nenad Milijaš	12(7)	2	2	0	0(1)	0	14(8)	2	2	0	
21	DF	(England) Daniel Jones ¤	0	0	0	0	0	0	0	0	0	0	
22	DF	(England) Jason Shackell ¤	0	0	0	0	0	0	0	0	0	0	
23	DF	(Guadeloupe) Ronald Zubar	23	1	2	1	1	0	26	2	5	0	
24	DF	(England) Mark Little ¤	0	0	0	0	0	0	0	0	0	0	
25	DF	(Scotland) Neill Collins ¤ †	0	0	0	0	1	0	1	0	0	0	(Note: Collins was initially loaned to Preston North End, and later transferred there permanently.)
25	MF	(Belgium) Geoffrey Mujangi Bia ‡	1(2)	0	1(1)	0	0	0	2(3)	0	0	0	
26	DF	(England) Matt Hill ¤	2	0	0	0	1	0	3	0	0	0	
27	DF	(England) Michael Mancienne ‡	22(8)	0	3	0	0	0	25(8)	0	6	0	
28	MF	(England) George Friend ¤	1	0	0	0	0	0	1	0	0	0	
29	FW	(Republic of Ireland) Kevin Doyle	33(1)	9	0(1)	0	1(1)	0	34(3)	9	5	0	
30	GK	(Nigeria) Carl Ikeme ¤	0	0	0	0	0	0	0	0	0	0	
31	GK	(England) Matt Murray	0	0	0	0	0	0	0	0	0	0	
32	DF	(Republic of Ireland) Kevin Foley	23(2)	0	3	0	1	0	27(2)	0	1	0	
33	FW	(Austria) Stefan Maierhofer ¤	1(7)	1	0	0	1	0	2(7)	1	0	1	
34	DF	(England) Darren Ward ¤ †	0	0	0	0	0	0	0	0	0	0	(Note: Ward was initially loaned to Millwall, and later transferred there permanently.)
34	MF	(Algeria) Adlène Guedioura ‡	7(7)	1	0	0	0	0	7(7)	1	2	0	
35	MF	(England) Elliott Bennett †	0	0	0	0	0	0	0	0	0	0	(Note: Bennett was transferred to Brighton & Hove Albion.)
35	MF	(Ecuador) Segundo Castillo ‡	7(1)	0	0	0	1	0	8(1)	0	0	0	
36	DF	(Republic of Ireland) John Dunleavy	0	0	0	0	0	0	0	0	0	0	
37	MF	(England) Kyle Bennett	0	0	0	0	0	0	0	0	0	0	
38	MF	(England) David Davis ¤	0	0	0	0	0	0	0	0	0	0	
39	FW	(England) Sam Winnall	0	0	0	0	0	0	0	0	0	0	
40	DF	(England) Danny Batth ¤	0	0	0	0	0	0	0	0	0	0	
41	FW	(England) Ashley Hemmings	0	0	0	0	0	0	0	0	0	0	
42	DF	(England) Scott Malone ¤	0	0	0	0	0	0	0	0	0	0	
43	FW	(England) James Spray	0	0	0	0	0	0	0	0	0	0	
44	MF	(England) Nathaniel Mendez-Laing	0	0	0	0	1	0	1	0	0	0	

=== Awards ===
Award	Winner
Fans' Player of the Season	Jody Craddock
Players' Player of the Season	Kevin Doyle
Young Player of the Season	Danny Batth
Academy Player of the Season	Nathan Rooney
Goal of the Season	Nenad Milijaš (vs Bolton, 5 December 2009)

== Transfers ==
=== In ===
Date	Player	From	Fee
15 June 2009	(Serbia) Nenad Milijaš	(Serbia) Red Star Belgrade	£2.6 million
17 June 2009	(United States) Marcus Hahnemann	Reading	Free
30 June 2009	(Republic of Ireland) Kevin Doyle	Reading	£6.5 million
30 June 2009	(Northern Ireland) Johnny Gorman	Manchester United	Free
30 June 2009	(Slovenia) Aljaž Cotman	(Slovenia) Triglav	Free
1 July 2009	(England) Andrew Surman	Southampton	£1.2 million
3 July 2009	(England) Greg Halford	Sunderland	£2 million
4 July 2009	(Guadeloupe) Ronald Zubar	(France) Marseille	£2.5 million
31 August 2009	(Austria) Stefan Maierhofer	(Austria) Rapid Vienna	£1.8 million

=== Out ===
Date	Player	To	Fee
June 2009	(England) Matt Bailey	Released	Free
June 2009	(Republic of Ireland) Mark Connolly	Released	Free
June 2009	(England) Lewis Gobern	Released	Free
June 2009	(England) David Ijaha	Released	Free
June 2009	(England) Billy Lumley	Released	Free
June 2009	(England) Alex Melbourne	Released	Free
1 July 2009	(Republic of Ireland) Stephen Gleeson	Milton Keynes Dons	Undisclosed
10 July 2009	(Republic of Ireland) Darren Potter	Sheffield Wednesday	Undisclosed
19 August 2009	(England) Elliott Bennett	Brighton & Hove Albion	Undisclosed
1 January 2010	(England) Darren Ward	Millwall	Undisclosed
5 January 2010	(Scotland) Neill Collins	Preston North End	Undisclosed

=== Loans in ===
Start date	Player	From	End date
13 August 2009	(England) Michael Mancienne	Chelsea	End of season
31 August 2009	(Ecuador) Segundo Castillo	(Serbia) Red Star Belgrade	End of season
15 September 2009	(Hungary) Bence Szabó	(Hungary) Újpest	End of season
21 January 2010	(Belgium) Geoffrey Mujangi Bia	(Belgium) RSC Charleroi	End of season
25 January 2010	(Algeria) Adlène Guedioura	(Belgium) RSC Charleroi	End of season

=== Loans out ===
Start date	Player	To	End date
11 August 2009	(England) George Friend	Millwall	16 September 2010
15 August 2009	(England) Jason Shackell	Doncaster Rovers	End of season
31 August 2009	(Scotland) Neill Collins	Preston North End	4 January 2010
11 September 2009	(England) Darren Ward	Millwall	4 January 2010
17 September 2009	(England) Danny Batth	Colchester United	29 April 2010
18 September 2009	(England) George Friend	Southend United	18 October 2009
24 September 2009	(England) Daniel Jones	Notts County	4 January 2010
5 October 2009	(England) Mark Little	Chesterfield	4 January 2010
19 October 2009	(Wales) Sam Vokes	Leeds United	1 January 2010
22 October 2009	(England) David Davis	Darlington	4 January 2010
28 October 2009	(Nigeria) Carl Ikeme	Charlton Athletic	28 November 2010
30 October 2009	(England) George Friend	Scunthorpe United	13 December 2009
24 November 2009	(England) Scott Malone	Southend United	29 April 2010
26 November 2009	(Nigeria) Carl Ikeme	Sheffield United	26 December 2010
6 January 2010	(Nigeria) Carl Ikeme	Queens Park Rangers	6 April 2010
25 January 2010	(England) Matt Hill	Queens Park Rangers	End of season
12 February 2010	(Scotland) Chris Iwelumo	Bristol City	15 March 2010
15 February 2010	(England) Daniel Jones	Bristol Rovers	End of season
2 March 2010	(England) Mark Little	Peterborough United	End of season
4 March 2010	(England) George Friend	Exeter City	End of season
15 March 2010	(Austria) Stefan Maierhofer	Bristol City	11 April 2010

== Management and coaching staff ==
Position	Name
Manager	Mick McCarthy
Assistant manager	Terry Connor
First Team Fitness and Conditioning coach	Tony Daley
Goalkeeping coach	Pat Mountain
Development Coach, 18-21's	Steve Weaver
Academy Manager	Kevin Thelwell
Assistant Academy Manager / Under-18's coach	Mick Halsall
Club Doctor	Dr Matthew Perry
Head of medical department	Steve Kemp
Club Physio	Alan Peacham

== Kit ==
The season saw a new home and away kit, both manufactured by Le Coq Sportif. The away kit was notable in featuring red trims, a reference to their original red and white stripes when the club was first formed. Both shirts featured the club's new sponsor, the internet gambling company Sportingbet.com.

== See also ==
- 2009–10 Premier Reserve League
