= Elliot Hodge =

English footballer

Personal information
- Full name: Elliot Stephen Hodge
- Date of birth: 17 January 1996 (age 30)
- Place of birth: Nottingham, England
- Position: Midfielder

Team information
- Current team: Hednesford Town

Youth career
- Notts County

Senior career*
Years	Team	Apps	(Gls)
2015–2017	Lincoln City	11	(0)
2015–2016	→ Stamford (loan)	11	(1)
2016	→ Gainsborough Trinity (loan)	5	(0)
2016	→ Stafford Rangers (loan)		
2016–2017	→ Telford United (loan)	15	(0)
2017–2018	Notts County	1	(0)
2018	→ Alfreton Town (loan)	1	(0)
2018–2019	Burton Albion	2	(0)
2019	Leamington	9	(0)
2019	Kettering Town	7	(0)
2019–	Hednesford Town	0	(0)
- * Club domestic league appearances and goals as of 23:01, 27 October 2019 (UTC)

Elliot Hodge (born 17 January 1996) is an English professional footballer who plays as a midfielder for Hednesford Town. He is the son of former Nottingham Forest footballer, Steve Hodge.

A former Notts County trainee, he signed with Lincoln City in February 2015. He played on loan at Stamford, Gainsborough Trinity, Stafford Rangers and A.F.C. Telford United, before he rejoined Notts County in August 2017.

== Playing career ==
=== Lincoln City ===
Hodge completed a scholarship at Notts County, before he signing with Lincoln City on a short-term contract 2 February 2015 after impressing manager Chris Moyses on trial. He signed a new one-year contract the following month. He made his first-team debut on 25 April, in a 0–0 draw at Dartford.

He joined Northern Premier League Premier Division side Stamford on loan and made his debut in a 3–1 defeat at Frickley Athletic on 14 November 2015. He scored his first goal in senior football on 26 January, in a 4–1 Doodson Cup victory over Buxton at the Zeeco Stadium. He made a total of 12 appearances for the "Daniels", scoring one goal. On 23 February 2016, he joined National League North club Gainsborough Trinity on loan. He played five matches for the "Holy Blues", before returning to Sincil Bank. He played nine games for the "Imps" across the 2015–16 campaign.

Hodge returned to the Northern Premier League Premier Division on an initial one-month loan at Stafford Rangers on 9 September 2016. He returned to the National League North on a one-month loan at A.F.C. Telford United in December. He played 15 games for the "Bucks" to help Telford to a 17th-place finish at the end of the 2016–17 season, whilst he also featured twice for parent club Lincoln, who achieved promotion to the English Football League as champions of the National League. He was released by Lincoln manager Danny Cowley in June 2017.

=== Notts County ===
On 1 August 2017, Hodge re-signed with Notts County of EFL League Two after impressing manager Kevin Nolan on trial.

Hodge joined Alfreton Town on a month-long loan deal on 22 January 2018.

He was released by Notts County at the end of the 2017–18 season.

== Style of play ==
Speaking in August 2017, Hodge said that "my best quality is probably my pace, and being a winger I like to stay out wide, I like to be in one-v-one situations against the defender, but I am more than happy doing dog work too".

== Career statistics ==
As of match played 1 January 2018

Appearances and goals by club, season and competition
Club	Season	League			FA Cup		League Cup		Other		Total	
Club	Season	Division	Apps	Goals	Apps	Goals	Apps	Goals	Apps	Goals	Apps	Goals
Lincoln City	2014–15	Conference Premier	1	0	0	0	—		0	0	1	0
Lincoln City	2015–16	National League	8	0	1	0	—		0	0	9	0
Lincoln City	2016–17	National League	2	0	0	0	—		0	0	2	0
Lincoln City	Total		11	0	1	0	0	0	0	0	12	0
Stamford (loan)	2015–16	NPL Premier Division	11	1	0	0	—		1 (Note: Appearance in the NPL Challenge Cup)	0	12	1
Gainsborough Trinity (loan)	2015–16	National League North	5	0	0	0	—		0	0	5	0
A.F.C. Telford United (loan)	2016–17	National League North	15	0	0	0	—		0	0	15	0
Notts County	2017–18	League Two	1	0	0	0	1	0	2 (Note: Appearances in the EFL Trophy)	0	4	0
Career total			43	1	1	0	1	0	3	0	48	1
