= 2017–18 Chesterfield F.C. season =

Chesterfield F.C.
2017–18 season
- Chairman: Mike Warner
- Manager: Gary Caldwell (until 16 September); Jack Lester (29 September–23 April); Martin Allen (since 15 May)
- Stadium: Proact Stadium
- League Two: 24th (relegated)
- FA Cup: First round
- League Cup: First round
- Football League Trophy: Second round
- Top goalscorer: League: Kristian Dennis (19); All: Kristian Dennis (21)
Home colours	Away colours

The 2017–18 season was the 151st season in Chesterfield's history and their first season back in League Two for four years, following relegation the previous season. Along with League Two, the club participated in the FA Cup, League Cup and EFL Trophy.

The season covers the period from 1 July 2017 to 30 June 2018.

== Transfers ==
=== Transfers in ===
Date from	Position	Nationality	Name	From	Fee	Ref.
1 July 2017	GK	ENG	Joe Anyon	Scunthorpe United	Free Transfer	
1 July 2017	RB	GIB	Scott Wiseman	Scunthorpe United	Free Transfer	
1 July 2017	RB	ENG	Bradley Barry	Swindon Town	Free Transfer	
1 July 2017	LB	ENG	Jerome Binnom-Williams	Peterborough United	Free Transfer	
1 July 2017	AM	ENG	Jordan Sinnott	FC Halifax Town	Free Transfer	
1 July 2017	CF	ENG	Delial Brewster	Everton	Free Transfer	
1 July 2017	CF	ENG	Chris O'Grady	Brighton & Hove Albion	Free transfer	
1 July 2017	CF	ENG	Gozie Ugwu	Woking	Free Transfer	
8 July 2017	CM	ENG	Jak McCourt	Northampton Town	Free Transfer	
3 August 2017	CM	NIR	Robbie Weir	Leyton Orient	Free Transfer	
25 August 2017	CB	ENG	Marshall Willock	Solihull Moors	Undisclosed	
1 September 2017	LB	GUY	Matthew Briggs	Colchester United	Free Transfer	
1 January 2018	RB	ENG	Drew Talbot	Portsmouth	Free Transfer	
4 January 2018	LW	ENG	Zavon Hines	Maidstone United	Free Transfer	
4 January 2018	AM	ENG	Josh Kay	Barnsley	Free Transfer	
18 January 2018	CB	ENG	Alex Whitmore	Burnley	Free Transfer	
31 January 2018	SS	ENG	Louis Dodds	Shrewsbury Town	Free Transfer	
31 January 2018	LB	ENG	George Smith	Northampton Town	Undisclosed	
1 February 2018	CM	ENG	Giles Coke	Free agent	Free Transfer	

=== Transfers out ===
Date from	Position	Nationality	Name	To	Fee	Ref.
1 July 2017	GK	ENG	Lloyd Allinson	FC United of Manchester	Released	(Note: Lloyd Allinson joined FC United of Manchester following his release.)
1 July 2017	CF	ENG	Jake Beesley	Salford City	Released	(Note: Jake Beesley joined Salford City following his release.)
1 July 2017	CF	ENG	Sylvan Ebanks-Blake	AFC Telford United	Released	(Note: Sylvan Ebanks-Blake joined AFC Telford United following his release.)
1 July 2017	RB	LBY	Sadiq El Fitouri	Al-Ahli Tripoli	Released	(Note: Sadiq El Fitouri joined Al-Ahli Tripoli following his release.)
1 July 2017	CF	WAL	Ched Evans	Sheffield United	Undisclosed	
1 July 2017	AM	ENG	Dan Gardner	Oldham Athletic	Free Transfer	
1 July 2017	RB	NZL	Liam Graham	Auckland City	Released	(Note: Liam Graham joined Auckland City following his release.)
1 July 2017	DM	ENG	Ritchie Humphreys	Sheffield	Released	(Note: Ritchie Humphreys joined Sheffield following his release.)
1 July 2017	LB	ENG	Daniel Jones	Notts County	Released	(Note: Daniel Jones joined Notts County following his release.)
1 July 2017	CM	ESP	Ángel Martínez	Sabadell	Released	(Note: Ángel Martínez joined Sabadell following his release.)
1 July 2017	CF	ENG	Curtis Morrison	Guiseley	Released	(Note: Curtis Morrison joined Guiseley following his release.)
1 July 2017	CM	ENG	Jon Nolan	Shrewsbury Town	Undisclosed	
1 July 2017	AM	IRL	Jay O'Shea	Bury	Released	(Note: Jay O'Shea joined Bury following his release.)
1 July 2017	CB	ENG	Charlie Raglan	Oxford United	Released	(Note: Charlie Raglan joined Oxford United following his release.)
1 July 2017	GK	GER	Thorsten Stuckmann	Fortuna Düsseldorf II	Released	(Note: Thorsten Stuckmann joined Fortuna Düsseldorf II following his release.)
19 July 2017	ST	BER	Rai Simons	Free agent	Free agent	
18 August 2017	LB	WAL	Dion Donohue	Portsmouth	Undisclosed	
25 August 2017	RB	SCO	Paul McGinn	Partick Thistle	Mutual Consent	(Note: Paul McGinn joined Partick Thistle following his departure.)
6 November 2017	GK	ENG	Tommy Lee	—N/a	Retired	
4 January 2018	CB	ENG	Jay Smith	Free agent	Released	
10 January 2018	RW	ENG	Reece Mitchell	Torquay United	Mutual Consent	(Note: Reece Mitchell joined Torquay United following his departure.)
11 January 2018	LB	GUY	Matthew Briggs	Barnet	Released	(Note: Matthew Briggs joined Barnet following his release.)
31 January 2018	CM	ENG	Connor Dimaio	Free agent	Mutual Consent	

=== Loans in ===
Start date	Position	Nationality	Name	From	End date	Ref.
11 July 2017	CM	ENG	Louis Reed	Sheffield United	30 June 2018	
18 August 2017	CM	ENG	Jordan Flores	Wigan Athletic	31 January 2018 (Note: Flores' loan was initially meant to last until 30 June 2018, but was cancelled on 31 January 2018, due to injuries sustained in a car crash on 23 October 2017.)	
25 August 2017	LB	ENG	Andy Kellett	Wigan Athletic	30 June 2018	
30 August 2017	SS	ITA	Diego De Girolamo	Bristol City	31 January 2018 (Note: De Girolamo's loan was initially meant to last until 30 June 2018, but was ended by mutual consent on 31 January 2018.)	
31 August 2017	CB	SCO	Zak Jules	Shrewsbury Town	26 September 2017 (Note: Jules' loan was initially meant to last until 14 January 2018, but was cut short when he was injured in the 2-3 defeat to Yeovil Town on 26 September 2017.)	
6 December 2017	GK	ENG	Cameron Dawson	Sheffield Wednesday	13 December 2017	
21 December 2017	GK	ENG	Jake Eastwood	Sheffield United	5 January 2018	
4 January 2018	CB	ENG	Sid Nelson	Millwall	30 June 2018	
5 January 2018	GK	ENG	Aaron Ramsdale	Bournemouth	30 June 2018	
31 January 2018	RW	ENG	Dylan Mottley-Henry	Barnsley	30 June 2018	
31 January 2018	CF	ENG	Jacob Brown	Barnsley	30 June 2018	

=== Loans out ===
Start date	Position	Nationality	Name	From	End date	Ref.
25 August 2017	CF	ENG	Ricky German	Alfreton Town	15 October 2017	
25 August 2017	GK	ENG	Dylan Parkin	Ossett Albion	22 September 2017	
4 September 2017	MF	ENG	Jack Brownell	Sheffield	2 October 2017	
4 September 2017	DF	ENG	Jay Smith	Sheffield	2 October 2017	
22 September 2017	GK	ENG	Dylan Parkin	Sheffield	21 October 2017	
6 October 2017	CB	ENG	Marshall Willock	Kettering Town	6 November 2017	
16 October 2017	CF	ENG	Ricky German	Sheffield	8 November 2017	
9 November 2017	CF	ENG	Ricky German	Matlock Town	9 December 2017	
9 January 2018	CF	ENG	Delial Brewster	Chorley	30 June 2018	
31 January 2018	RB	GIB	Scott Wiseman	Rochdale	30 June 2018	
16 February 2018	CF	ENG	Ricky German	Matlock Town	30 June 2018	
23 March 2018	CB	ENG	Marshall Willock	Matlock Town	30 June 2018	

== Players ==
=== Current squad ===
As of 23 March 2018

Note: Flags indicate national team as defined under FIFA eligibility rules; some limited exceptions apply. Players may hold more than one non-FIFA nationality.

No.	Pos.	Nation	Player
1	GK	ENG	Aaron Ramsdale (on loan from Bournemouth)
3	DF	ENG	Jerome Binnom-Williams
4	DF	ENG	Sam Hird (vice-captain)
6	DF	ENG	Ian Evatt (captain)
7	MF	ENG	Giles Coke
8	MF	ENG	Jordan Sinnott
9	FW	ENG	Kristian Dennis
10	FW	ENG	Chris O'Grady
11	FW	ENG	Gozie Ugwu
12	GK	ENG	Joe Anyon
15	MF	ENG	Joe Rowley
16	MF	ENG	Charlie Wakefield
17	DF	ENG	George Smith
19	FW	ENG	Louis Dodds
20	DF	ENG	Laurence Maguire
21	MF	ENG	Jack Brownell

No.	Pos.	Nation	Player
22	DF	ENG	Drew Talbot
24	DF	ENG	Andy Kellett (on loan from Wigan Athletic)
25	MF	ENG	Louis Reed (on loan from Sheffield United)
26	MF	ENG	Jak McCourt
27	DF	ENG	Bradley Barry
28	MF	NIR	Robbie Weir (vice-captain)
30	GK	ENG	Dylan Parkin
31	DF	NGR	Ify Ofoegbu
33	DF	ENG	Alex Whitmore
34	GK	ENG	Brad Jones
35	DF	ENG	Sid Nelson (on loan from Millwall)
36	FW	ENG	Luke Rawson
37	MF	ENG	Josh Kay
40	MF	ENG	Dylan Mottley-Henry (on loan from Barnsley)
41	MF	ENG	Zavon Hines
44	FW	ENG	Jacob Brown (on loan from Barnsley)
45	MF	ENG	Jack Holmes

=== Out on loan ===
Note: Flags indicate national team as defined under FIFA eligibility rules; some limited exceptions apply. Players may hold more than one non-FIFA nationality.

No.	Pos.	Nation	Player
2	DF	ENG	Marshall Willock (on loan at Matlock Town until the end of the season)
5	DF	GIB	Scott Wiseman (on loan at Rochdale until the end of the season)
18	FW	ENG	Delial Brewster (on loan at Chorley until the end of the season)
29	FW	ENG	Ricky German (on loan at Matlock Town until the end of the season)

== Competitions ==
=== Friendlies ===
4 July 2017	Sheffield	1–4	Chesterfield	Dronfield
19:30 BST	Marsden 58'	Report	Evatt 14'; Dennis 33'; Donohue 48'; German 81'	Stadium: Coach and Horses Ground

6 July 2017	Matlock Town	0–4	Chesterfield	Matlock
19:30 BST		Report	Ugwu 12', 15'; Mitchell 61'; German 66'	Stadium: Causeway Lane

7 July 2017 GF Tomlinson Cup	Buxton	0–4	Chesterfield	Buxton
19:30 BST		Report	Brewster 27'; Sinnott 31' (pen.); German 35'; Dennis 67'	Stadium: The Silverlands

11 July 2017	Benfica B	0–0	Chesterfield	Santo António, Portugal
18:30 WEST		Report		Stadium: Complexo Desportivo de Vila Real de Santo António

15 July 2017	Chesterfield	0–2	Middlesbrough	Santo António, Portugal
18:30 WEST		Report	Stuani 16'; Bamford 57' (pen.)	Stadium: Complexo Desportivo de Vila Real de Santo António

18 July 2017	Chesterfield	1–2	Sheffield United	Chesterfield
19:30 BST	O'Grady 32'	Report	O'Connell 72'; Brooks 85'	Stadium: Proact Stadium

22 July 2017	Stoke City U23s	4–0	Chesterfield	Sheffield
14:00 BST	Joselu 6'; Campbell 9', 51'; Telford 61'	Report		Stadium: St George's Park Graves

25 July 2017	Chesterfield	1–3	Rotherham United	Chesterfield
19:30 BST	O'Grady 87'	Report	Ball 17'; Taylor 27'; Williams 79'	Stadium: Proact Stadium; Attendance: 2,498

29 July 2017	Chesterfield	4–0	Doncaster Rovers	Chesterfield
15:00 BST	Dennis 55'; Brewster 71'; Ugwu 83'; Mitchell 85'	Report		Stadium: Proact Stadium

15 August 2017	Handsworth Parramore	1–5	Chesterfield	Worksop
	Denton 31'	Report	Wakefield 29'; Dimaio 38'; Mitchell 41'; German 62'; Fowler 76'	Stadium: Sandy Lane; Referee: Sam Wright

=== League Two ===
==== League table ====
Pos	Team	Pld	W	D	L	GF	GA	GD	Pts	Promotion, qualification or relegation
20	Port Vale	46	11	14	21	49	67	−18	47	
21	Forest Green Rovers	46	13	8	25	54	77	−23	47	
22	Morecambe	46	9	19	18	41	56	−15	46	
23	Barnet (R)	46	12	10	24	46	65	−19	46	Relegation to the National League
24	Chesterfield (R)	46	10	8	28	47	83	−36	38	Relegation to the National League

Source: BBC Sport
Rules for classification: 1) Points; 2) Goal difference; 3) Number of goals scored
(R) Relegated

==== Results summary ====
Overall								Home						Away					
Pld	W	D	L	GF	GA	GD	Pts	W	D	L	GF	GA	GD	W	D	L	GF	GA	GD
46	10	8	28	47	83	−36	38	8	3	12	27	33	−6	2	5	16	20	50	−30

Last updated: 5 May 2018.

==== Results by matchday ====
Matchday	1	2	3	4	5	6	7	8	9	10	11	12	13	14	15	16	17	18	19	20	21	22	23	24	25	26	27	28	29	30	31	32	33	34	35	36	37	38	39	40	41	42	43	44	45	46
Ground	H	A	H	A	H	A	A	H	A	H	H	A	H	A	A	H	A	H	H	A	H	A	A	H	H	A	A	H	A	H	H	H	A	H	H	A	H	A	A	A	H	A	A	H	H	A
Result	L	L	W	L	D	L	D	L	L	L	L	L	L	W	L	D	D	W	W	D	W	L	L	L	D	L	L	W	W	L	L	L	L	W	L	D	W	L	L	D	L	L	L	L	W	L
Position	20	24	19	24	21	23	21	23	23	23	23	24	24	24	24	24	24	24	24	24	21	23	23	23	22	22	23	22	22	22	23	23	23	23	23	23	23	23	24	24	24	24	24	24	24	24

Updated to match(es) played on 5 May 2018. Source: Statto.com
A = Away; H = Home; W = Win; D = Draw; L = Loss

==== Matches ====
On 21 June 2017, the league fixtures were announced.

5 August 2017 1	Chesterfield	1–3	Grimsby Town	Chesterfield
15:00 BST	Donohue (yellow card) 5'; Dennis 82' (yellow card) 86'; Evatt (red card) 85'	Report	Clarke 33'; Jones 39'; Davies 85' (pen.); Mills (yellow card) 86' (yellow-red card) 88'	Stadium: Proact Stadium; Attendance: 7,925; Referee: Eddie Ilderton

12 August 2017 2	Notts County	2–0	Chesterfield	Nottingham
15:00 BST	Grant 53', 90+6' (yellow card) 73'	Report	Ugwu (yellow card) 29'; Wiseman (red card) 45'; Reed (yellow card) 49'; Weir (yellow card) 63'; Hird (yellow card) 90+5'	Stadium: Meadow Lane; Attendance: 7,021; Referee: Andy Haines

19 August 2017 3	Chesterfield	2–0	Port Vale	Chesterfield
15:00 BST	Dennis 38'; Sinnott 43'; Wiseman (yellow card) 83'; McCourt (yellow card) 90+6'	Report		Stadium: Proact Stadium; Attendance: 5,058; Referee: Tom Nield

26 August 2017 4	Newport County	4–1	Chesterfield	Newport
15:00 BST	Nouble 55', 66', 68'; Amond 82'; Rigg (yellow card) 90+1'	Report	O'Grady 37'; Reed (yellow card) 90'	Stadium: Rodney Parade; Attendance: 4,332; Referee: David Webb

2 September 2017 5	Chesterfield	0–0	Coventry City	Chesterfield
15:00 BST	Weir (yellow card) 49' (yellow-red card) 60'; Flores (yellow card) 58'; Jules (yellow card) 87'	Report	Grimmer (yellow card) 33'	Stadium: Proact Stadium; Attendance: 5,164; Referee: Darren Drysdale

9 September 2017 6	Crewe Alexandra	5–1	Chesterfield	Crewe
15:00 BST	Porter 6', 47'; Ng 54'; Cooper 66'; Ainley 81'	Report	Nolan 72' (o.g.); Reed (yellow card) 90'	Stadium: Gresty Road; Attendance: 3,513; Referee: Martin Coy

12 September 2017 7	Colchester United	1–1	Chesterfield	Colchester
19:45 BST	Hanlan 82'	Report	Reed 43'; Barry (yellow card) 55'; Lee (yellow card) 78'	Stadium: Colchester Community Stadium; Attendance: 2,552; Referee: Darren Handley

16 September 2017 8	Chesterfield	1–2	Accrington Stanley	Chesterfield
15:00 BST	Barry (yellow card) 35' (yellow-red card) 63'; Flores (yellow card) 44'; De Girolamo (yellow card) 59'; Reed (yellow card) 72'; Dennis 77' (pen.)	Report	Connelly (yellow card) 41'; Kee 68'; McConville (yellow card) 78'; Wilks 82'; Donacien (yellow card) 90+6'	Stadium: Proact Stadium; Attendance: 4,487; Referee: Craig Hicks

23 September 2017 9	Luton Town	1–0	Chesterfield	Luton
15:00 BST	Hylton 53'; Mpanzu (red card) 77'; Sheehan (yellow card) 80'	Report	Hird (yellow card) 25'	Stadium: Kenilworth Road; Attendance: 7,575; Referee: Charles Breakspear

26 September 2017 10	Chesterfield	2–3	Yeovil Town	Chesterfield
19:45 BST	Kellett (yellow card) 37'; Weir 50' (yellow card) 58'; Dennis 72'	Report	Olomola 3'; Smith (yellow card) 12'; Khan 26'; Bailey 90'; Worthington (yellow card) 90+5'	Stadium: Proact Stadium; Attendance: 3,955; Referee: David Coote

30 September 2017 11	Chesterfield	0–2	Cheltenham Town	Chesterfield
15:00 BST	Briggs (yellow card) 86'; O'Grady (yellow card) 88'	Report	Eisa 44', 68'	Stadium: Proact Stadium; Attendance: 5,305; Referee: Ben Toner

7 October 2017 12	Lincoln City	2–1	Chesterfield	Lincoln
15:00 BST	Bostwick 17'; Kellett 25' (o.g.); Eardley (yellow card) 45+1'; Raggett (yellow card) 69'	Report	Dennis 82' (pen.)	Stadium: Sincil Bank; Attendance: 9,485; Referee: John Brooks

14 October 2017 13	Chesterfield	0–2	Morecambe	Chesterfield
15:00 BST	Weir (yellow card) 31'	Report	McGurk 17'; Kenyon (yellow card) 19'; Thompson 47'; Oliver (yellow card) 90+2'	Stadium: Proact Stadium; Attendance: 4,489; Referee: Darren Drysdale

17 October 2017 14	Crawley Town	0–2	Chesterfield	Crawley
19:45 BST	Camara (yellow card) 81'	Report	Weir (yellow card) 22'; Dennis 73'; Rowley (yellow card) 75'; Flores 88'	Stadium: Broadfield Stadium; Attendance: 1,516; Referee: Nick Kinesley

21 October 2017 15	Cambridge United	2–1	Chesterfield	Cambridge
15:00 BST	Brown 70'; Ikpeazu 78'	Report	Dennis 55'; Briggs (yellow card) 69'; Evatt (yellow card) 84'; Flores (yellow card) 90+1'	Stadium: Abbey Stadium; Attendance: 4,529; Referee: John Busby

28 October 2017 16	Chesterfield	2–2	Carlisle United	Chesterfield
15:00 BST	Briggs (yellow card) 9'; McCourt 40'; Dennis 84'	Report	Liddle (yellow card) 39'; Grainger 55'; Bennett 73'	Stadium: Proact Stadium; Attendance: 5,102; Referee: Brett Huxtable

11 November 2017 17	Swindon Town	2–2	Chesterfield	Swindon
15:00 GMT	Woolery (yellow card) 36'; Dunne (yellow card) 45+1'; Elšnik 47'; Norris 90+6' (pen.)	Report	Dennis 56' (yellow card) 90+5'; Reed (yellow card) 63'; McCourt 72'; Maguire (yellow card) 89'; Evatt (yellow card) 90+5'	Stadium: County Ground; Attendance: 6,140; Referee: Lee Collins

18 November 2017 18	Chesterfield	1–0	Exeter City	Chesterfield
15:00 GMT	Dennis 50'; Barry (yellow card) 61'; Wiseman (yellow card) 90' (yellow-red card) 90'	Report		Stadium: Proact Stadium; Attendance: 5,195; Referee: Martin Coy

21 November 2017 19	Chesterfield	3–2	Forest Green Rovers	Chesterfield
19:45 GMT	McCourt 22', 54'; Dennis 81'	Report	Fitzwater (yellow card) 20'; Traoré (yellow card) 29'; Monthé (red card) 49'; Doidge 60', 90+3'	Stadium: Proact Stadium; Attendance: 4,306; Referee: Robert Jones

25 November 2017 20	Mansfield Town	2–2	Chesterfield	Mansfield
13:00 GMT	White 26'; Diamond 88'	Report	Rowley 14'; Kellett 58'	Stadium: Field Mill; Attendance: 7,525; Referee: Andy Woolmer

9 December 2017 21	Chesterfield	2–1	Barnet	Chesterfield
15:00 GMT	Reed (yellow card) 55'; Dennis (yellow card) 55'; Clough 66' (o.g.); Evatt (yellow card) 77'; Weir 90+3'	Report	Akinde 11'; Fonguck (yellow card) 63'	Stadium: Proact Stadium; Attendance: 5,272; Referee: John Busby

16 December 2017 22	Wycombe Wanderers	1–0	Chesterfield	High Wycombe
15:00 GMT	Akinfenwa (yellow card) 3'; O'Nien 54'; Southwell (yellow card) 90+3'; Brown (yellow card) 90+7'	Report	McCourt (yellow card) 46'; Dennis (yellow card) 79'	Stadium: Adams Park; Attendance: 4,522; Referee: Nick Kinesley

23 December 2017 23	Stevenage	5–1	Chesterfield	Stevenage
15:00 GMT	Newton 13'; Gorman 28'; McCourt 44' (o.g.); Godden 50', 72'; Fryer (yellow card) 90+5'	Report	Dennis 42'; Hird (yellow card) 45+2'	Stadium: Broadhall Way; Attendance: 2,403; Referee: Craig Hicks

26 December 2017 24	Chesterfield	0–2	Crewe Alexandra	Chesterfield
15:00 GMT		Report	Porter 7'; Kirk 26'	Stadium: Proact Stadium; Attendance: 5,904; Referee: Tom Nield

30 December 2017 25	Chesterfield	0–0	Colchester United	Chesterfield
15:00 GMT	Hird (yellow card) 6'; Reed (yellow card) 88'; Binnom-Williams (yellow card) 90+1'	Report	Guthrie (yellow card) 86'	Stadium: Proact Stadium; Attendance: 5,537; Referee: Seb Stockbridge

1 January 2018 26	Coventry City	1–0	Chesterfield	Coventry
15:00 GMT	McNulty 14'; Bayliss (yellow card) 61'	Report	Dennis (yellow card) 45+4'; Wiseman (yellow card) 61' (yellow-red card) 80'	Stadium: Ricoh Arena; Attendance: 7,402; Referee: Trevor Kettle

6 January 2018 27	Accrington Stanley	4–0	Chesterfield	Accrington
15:00 GMT	Hughes 19'; McConville 32'; Ramsdale 49' (o.g.); Jackson (yellow card) 66'; Johnson (yellow card) 81'; Kee 89'; Richards-Everton (yellow card) 90+4'	Report	Maguire (yellow card) 9'; Hines (yellow card) 41'; German (yellow card) 90+4'	Stadium: Crown Ground; Attendance: 1,655; Referee: Chris Sarginson

13 January 2018 28	Chesterfield	2–0	Luton Town	Chesterfield
15:00 GMT	Kay (yellow card) 17'; Rowley 19'; McCourt 25'; Maguire (yellow card) 36'	Report	Justin (yellow card) 25'; Lee (yellow card) 86'	Stadium: Proact Stadium; Attendance: 5,715; Referee: Carl Boyeson

20 January 2018 29	Yeovil Town	1–2	Chesterfield	Yeovil
15:00	Wing 80'; Khan (red card) 90+4'	Report	McCourt (yellow card) 20'; Reed 66'; Kay (yellow card) 75'; Maguire (yellow card) 85'; Dennis 90+3' (yellow card) 90+4'	Stadium: Huish Park; Attendance: 3,972; Referee: Kevin Johnson

27 January 2018 30	Chesterfield	0–1	Stevenage	Chesterfield
15:00 GMT	Maguire (yellow card) 31'; Nelson (yellow card) 54'	Report	Franks (yellow card) 47'; Kennedy 48'; Godden (yellow card) 58'; King (yellow card) 90+1'	Stadium: Proact Stadium; Attendance: 4,981; Referee: Mark Heywood

3 February 2018 31	Chesterfield	1–2	Crawley Town	Chesterfield
15:00 GMT	Reed 18'; Kay (yellow card) 47'	Report	Randall (yellow card) 45+2'; Ahearne-Grant 57'; Young 90+3'	Stadium: Proact Stadium; Attendance: 5,159; Referee: Ross Joycce

10 February 2018	Morecambe	P–P	Chesterfield	Morecambe
15:00 GMT				Stadium: Globe Arena
Note: Match postponed due to a waterlogged pitch

13 February 2018 32	Chesterfield	2–3	Cambridge United	Chesterfield
19:45 GMT	Rowley 1'; Dennis 55'; Reed (yellow card) 61'; O'Grady (yellow card) 85'	Report	Maguire 21' (o.g.); Dunk (yellow card) 46' (goal) 90+5'; Ikpeazu 67' (pen.); Halliday (yellow card) 80'	Stadium: Proact Stadium; Attendance: 4,276; Referee: Darren Handley

17 February 2018 33	Carlisle United	2–0	Chesterfield	Carlisle
15:00 GMT	Etuhu 19'; Liddle (yellow card) 41'; O'Sullivan 81'	Report	Barry (yellow card) 37'; Kellett (yellow card) 63'; Brown (yellow card) 90'	Stadium: Brunton Park; Attendance: 4,025; Referee: Sebastian Stockbridge

24 February 2018 34	Chesterfield	2–1	Swindon Town	Chesterfield
15:00 GMT	O'Grady 2'; Kellett 51'; Reed (yellow card) 82'; Barry (yellow card) 90+4'	Report	Banks (red card) 72'; Menayese 75'; Norris (yellow card) 78'	Stadium: Proact Stadium; Attendance: 4,668; Referee: John Brooks

3 March 2018	Exeter City	P–P	Chesterfield	Exeter
15:00 GMT				Stadium: St James Park
Note: Match postponed due to adverse weather conditions

10 March 2018 35	Chesterfield	1–3	Lincoln City	Chesterfield
15:00 GMT	Whitmore 34'; Talbot (yellow card) 84'; Rowley (yellow card) 90+1'	Report	Woodyard (yellow card) 11'; Frecklington (yellow card) 44'; Bostwick 45'; Wharton 59'; Palmer 85' (yellow card) 86'	Stadium: Proact Stadium; Attendance: 6,395; Referee: David Webb

17 March 2018 36	Cheltenham Town	1–1	Chesterfield	Cheltenham
15:00 GMT	Andrews (yellow card) 19'; Graham 79'	Report	Weir (yellow card) 28'; Dennis 74'; Binnom-Williams (yellow card) 84'	Stadium: Whaddon Road; Attendance: 2,822; Referee: Ollie Yates

25 March 2018 37	Chesterfield	3–1	Notts County	Chesterfield
13:30 BST	Nelson 15'; Hines 38'; Whitmore (yellow card) 81'; Dennis 90+7' (pen.)	Report	Stead (yellow card) 62'; Jones 84'	Stadium: Proact Stadium; Attendance: 6,005; Referee: Sebastian Stockbridge

30 March 2018 38	Port Vale	2–1	Chesterfield	Stoke-on-Trent
15:00 BST	Pugh 45' (red card) 45+2'; Worrall (yellow card) 78'; Hannant (yellow card) 79'; Whitfield 82'; Smith (yellow card) 90+2'	Report	Barry (yellow card) 3'; Reed 56'; Talbot (yellow card) 78'; Hines (yellow card) 79'	Stadium: Vale Park; Attendance: 5,713; Referee: Tony Harrington

2 April 2018	Chesterfield	P–P	Newport County	Chesterfield
15:00 BST				Stadium: Proact Stadium
Note: Match postponed due to a frozen pitch

7 April 2018 39	Grimsby Town	1–0	Chesterfield	Cleethorpes
15:00 BST	Fox (yellow card) 53'; Vernon (yellow card) 55'; Dembélé (yellow card) 68'; Rose 88' (pen.) (yellow card) 88'	Report	Reed (yellow card) 79'; Talbot (yellow card) 90'	Stadium: Blundell Park; Attendance: 6,780; Referee: Bobby Madley

10 April 2018 40	Morecambe	2–2	Chesterfield	Morecambe
19:45 BST	Thompson 16' (yellow card) 26'; Kenyon (yellow card) 26'; Lang 33'	Report	Dennis 55'; Kellett 74'; Brown (yellow card) 76'	Stadium: Globe Arena; Attendance: 1,042; Referee: Martin Coy

14 April 2018 41	Chesterfield	0–1	Mansfield Town	Chesterfield
13:00 BST	Brown (yellow card) 34'; Dennis (yellow card) 45+1'; Weir (yellow card) 65'; McCourt (yellow card) 83'	Report	MacDonald (yellow card) 61'; Benning 67'; Hemmings (yellow card) 68'	Stadium: Proact Stadium; Attendance: 7,967; Referee: Darren Drysdale

17 April 2018 42	Exeter City	2–1	Chesterfield	Exeter
19:45 BST	Taylor (yellow card) 27'; Stockley 39'; Whitmore 74' (o.g.)	Report	Kellett 84'; Rowley (yellow card) 90+5'	Stadium: St James Park; Attendance: 3,560; Referee: Brendan Malone

21 April 2018 43	Forest Green Rovers	4–1	Chesterfield	Nailsworth
15:00 BST	Laird 27'; Doidge 78', 90+6' (pen.); Osbourne (yellow card) 80'; Gunning (yellow card) 86'; Grubb 90+4'	Report	Dennis 36' (pen.)	Stadium: The New Lawn; Attendance: 3,336; Referee: Scott Duncan

28 April 2018 44	Chesterfield	1–2	Wycombe Wanderers	Chesterfield
15:00 BST	Harriman 39' (o.g.)	Report	Tyson 45+1'; O'Nien (yellow card) 60'; Gape 76'; Mackail-Smith (yellow card) 90+3'	Stadium: Proact Stadium; Attendance: 5,679; Referee: Anthony Backhouse

1 May 2018 45	Chesterfield	1–0	Newport County	Chesterfield
19:45 BST	Dennis 71'	Report	White (yellow card) 53'	Stadium: Proact Stadium; Attendance: 4,608; Referee: Gavin Ward

5 May 2018 46	Barnet	3–0	Chesterfield	Edgware
15:00 BST	Akinde 42'; Brindley 81'; Nicholls 88'	Report		Stadium: The Hive; Attendance: 5,539; Referee: Dean Whitestone

=== EFL Cup ===
On 16 June 2017, Chesterfield were drawn away to Sheffield Wednesday in the first round.

8 August 2017 First round	Sheffield Wednesday	4–1	Chesterfield	Sheffield
19:45 BST	Fletcher (yellow card) 37' (goal) 45+2'; Hooper 43'; Reach (yellow card) 49'; Bannan 75'; Hutchinson 83'	Report	Dennis 38'; McCourt (yellow card) 41'; Hird (yellow card) 90+4'	Stadium: Hillsborough; Attendance: 11,682; Referee: Ross Joyce

=== FA Cup ===
4 November 2017 First round	Bradford City	2–0	Chesterfield	Bradford
15:00 GMT	Gilliead 4'; Jones 44'	Report	Dimaio (yellow card) 52'	Stadium: Valley Parade; Attendance: 4,747; Referee: Anthony Backhouse

=== EFL Trophy ===
On 12 July 2017, Chesterfield were drawn in Northern Group F against Bradford City, Rotherham United and Manchester City U23s.

Pos	Lge	Team	Pld	W	PW	PL	L	GF	GA	GD	Pts	Qualification
1	L1	Bradford City (Q)	3	2	0	0	1	6	6	0	6	Round 2
2	L2	Chesterfield (Q)	3	1	1	0	1	6	7	−1	5	Round 2
3	L1	Rotherham United (E)	3	1	0	1	1	5	3	+2	4	
4	ACA	Manchester City EDS (E)	3	0	1	1	1	4	5	−1	3	

Updated to match(es) played on 7 November 2017. Source: EFL.com
(E) Eliminated; (Q) Qualified to the phase indicated

29 August 2017 Group Game 1	Chesterfield	2–4	Bradford City	Chesterfield
19:00 BST	Dennis 24' (yellow card) 65'; Sinnott 79'; Evatt (yellow card) 85'	Report	Patrick 45+3'; Jones 57', 62' (yellow card) 77'; Hanson 80'	Stadium: Proact Stadium; Attendance: 1,099

3 October 2017 Group Game 2	Rotherham United	1–2	Chesterfield	Rotherham
19:00 BST	Vaulks 71'	Report	De Girolamo 9'; McCourt 89'	Stadium: New York Stadium; Attendance: 2,043; Referee: Darren Handley

29 November 2017 Group Game 3	Chesterfield	2–2 (4–3 p)	Manchester City U21s	Chesterfield
19:00 GMT	McCourt (yellow card) 22'; Hird (yellow card) 65'; Rowley 73'; Barry (yellow card) 90+1'; O'Grady 90+7'	Report	Oliver (red card) 76'; Francis 88'; Nmecha 90'	Stadium: Proact Stadium; Attendance: 1,266
	Penalties
	Kellett (penalty missed); Reed (penalty scored); Rowley (penalty scored); O'Grady (penalty scored); Hird (penalty scored)		Nmecha (penalty scored); Francis (penalty scored); Richards (penalty scored); Duhaney (penalty missed); Wilson (penalty missed)

5 December 2017 Second round	Fleetwood Town	2–0	Chesterfield	Fleetwood
19:45 GMT	Sowerby 17'; Ekpolo (yellow card) 86'; Reid 88'	Report	Dennis (yellow card) 87'	Stadium: Highbury Stadium; Attendance: 372; Referee: Ross Joyce

== Statistics ==
=== Appearances ===
As of 5 May 2018

- Italics indicate loan player
- Asterisk (*) indicates player left club mid-season
- Caret sign (^) indicates player finished season on loan at another club
- Hash sign (#) indicates player retired mid-season

No.	Pos	Nat	Player	Total		League One		FA Cup		EFL Cup		EFL Trophy	
No.	Pos	Nat	Player	Apps	Goals	Apps	Goals	Apps	Goals	Apps	Goals	Apps	Goals
1	GK	(England) ENG	Tommy Lee#	7	0	7	0	0	0	0	0	0	0
1	GK	(England) ENG	Cameron Dawson*	2	0	2	0	0	0	0	0	0	0
1	GK	(England) ENG	Jake Eastwood*	4	0	4	0	0	0	0	0	0	0
1	GK	(England) ENG	Aaron Ramsdale	19	0	19	0	0	0	0	0	0	0
2	DF	(Scotland) SCO	Paul McGinn*	0	0	0	0	0	0	0	0	0	0
2	DF	(England) ENG	Marshall Willock^	0	0	0	0	0	0	0	0	0	0
3	DF	(England) ENG	Jerome Binnom-Williams	20	0	13+6	0	0	0	0	0	1	0
4	DF	(England) ENG	Sam Hird	27	0	24	0	1	0	1	0	1	0
5	DF	(Gibraltar) GIB	Scott Wiseman^	29	0	23+1	0	1	0	1	0	3	0
6	DF	(England) ENG	Ian Evatt	24	0	21	0	1	0	0	0	2	0
7	MF	(England) ENG	Reece Mitchell*	6	0	0+4	0	0+1	0	0	0	1	0
7	MF	(England) ENG	Giles Coke	2	0	1+1	0	0	0	0	0	0	0
8	MF	(England) ENG	Jordan Sinnott	11	2	4+4	1	0+1	0	0	0	1+1	1
9	FW	(England) ENG	Kristian Dennis	49	21	39+5	19	1	0	1	1	1+2	1
10	FW	(England) ENG	Chris O'Grady	41	3	20+15	2	0+1	0	1	0	3+1	1
11	FW	(England) ENG	Gozie Ugwu	14	0	3+9	0	0	0	1	0	1	0
12	GK	(England) ENG	Joe Anyon	20	0	14	0	1	0	1	0	4	0
15	MF	(England) ENG	Joe Rowley	32	4	23+5	3	1	0	0	0	2+1	1
16	MF	(England) ENG	Charlie Wakefield	3	0	1	0	0	0	0	0	0+2	0
17	MF	(Republic of Ireland) IRL	Connor Dimaio*	14	0	2+8	0	1	0	0	0	3	0
17	DF	(England) ENG	George Smith	8	0	6+2	0	0	0	0	0	0	0
18	FW	(England) ENG	Delial Brewster^	3	0	0+2	0	0	0	0+1	0	0	0
19	MF	(Wales) WAL	Dion Donohue*	3	0	2	0	0	0	1	0	0	0
19	FW	(Italy) ITA	Diego De Girolamo*	18	1	6+9	0	0	0	0	0	3	1
19	FW	(England) ENG	Louis Dodds	11	0	7+4	0	0	0	0	0	0	0
20	DF	(England) ENG	Laurence Maguire	22	0	13+5	0	0	0	1	0	3	0
21	MF	(England) ENG	Jack Brownell	0	0	0	0	0	0	0	0	0	0
22	DF	(England) ENG	Jay Smith*	0	0	0	0	0	0	0	0	0	0
22	DF	(England) ENG	Drew Talbot	14	0	14	0	0	0	0	0	0	0
23	MF	(England) ENG	Jordan Flores*	14	1	12+1	1	0	0	0	0	1	0
24	DF	(England) ENG	Andy Kellett	39	4	28+7	4	1	0	0	0	1+2	0
25	MF	(England) ENG	Louis Reed	46	4	40+1	4	1	0	1	0	2+1	0
26	MF	(England) ENG	Jak McCourt	38	6	21+13	5	1	0	0	0	3	1
27	DF	(England) ENG	Bradley Barry	34	0	29	0	1	0	1	0	3	0
28	MF	(Northern Ireland) NIR	Robbie Weir	43	2	38+2	2	0	0	0	0	2+1	0
29	FW	(England) ENG	Ricky German^	3	0	0+2	0	0	0	0+1	0	0	0
30	GK	(England) ENG	Dylan Parkin	0	0	0	0	0	0	0	0	0	0
31	DF	(Nigeria) NGR	Ify Ofoegbu	0	0	0	0	0	0	0	0	0	0
32	DF	(Guyana) GUY	Matthew Briggs*	12	0	8+3	0	0	0	0	0	1	0
33	DF	(Scotland) SCO	Zak Jules*	6	0	6	0	0	0	0	0	0	0
33	DF	(England) ENG	Alex Whitmore	15	1	14+1	1	0	0	0	0	0	0
34	GK	(England) ENG	Brad Jones	0	0	0	0	0	0	0	0	0	0
35	DF	(England) ENG	Sid Nelson	15	1	15	1	0	0	0	0	0	0
36	FW	(England) ENG	Luke Rawson	1	0	0+1	0	0	0	0	0	0	0
37	MF	(England) ENG	Josh Kay	11	0	8+3	0	0	0	0	0	0	0
40	MF	(England) ENG	Dylan Mottley-Henry	2	0	1+1	0	0	0	0	0	0	0
41	MF	(England) ENG	Zavon Hines	11	1	9+2	1	0	0	0	0	0	0
44	FW	(England) ENG	Jacob Brown	13	0	8+5	0	0	0	0	0	0	0
45	MF	(England) ENG	Jack Holmes	0	0	0	0	0	0	0	0	0	0

=== Goalscorers ===
Rnk	No	Pos	Nat	Name	League One	FA Cup	EFL Cup	EFL Trophy	Total
1	9	FW	(England)	Kristian Dennis	19	0	1	1	21
2	26	MF	(England)	Jak McCourt	5	0	0	1	6
3	25	MF	(England)	Louis Reed	4	0	0	0	4
=	24	MF	(England)	Andy Kellett	4	0	0	0	4
=	15	MF	(England)	Joe Rowley	3	0	0	1	4
6	10	FW	(England)	Chris O'Grady	2	0	0	1	3
7	28	MF	(Northern Ireland)	Robbie Weir	2	0	0	0	2
=	8	MF	(England)	Jordan Sinnott	1	0	0	1	2
9	23	MF	(England)	Jordan Flores	1	0	0	0	1
=	33	MF	(England)	Alex Whitmore	1	0	0	0	1
=	35	DF	(England)	Sid Nelson	1	0	0	0	1
=	41	FW	(England)	Zavon Hines	1	0	0	0	1
=	19	FW	(Italy)	Diego De Girolamo	0	0	0	1	1
Own goals					3	0	0	0	3
Total					47	0	1	6	54
