= Dylan Mottley-Henry =

English footballer

Personal information
- Full name: Dylan Mottley-Henry
- Date of birth: 2 August 1997 (age 29)
- Place of birth: Leeds, England
- Height: 5 ft 10 in (1.78 m)
- Position: Winger

Team information
- Current team: Hednesford Town

Youth career
- Bradford City

Senior career*
Years	Team	Apps	(Gls)
2014–2016	Bradford City	2	(0)
2016	→ Altrincham (loan)	5	(0)
2016	→ Bradford Park Avenue (loan)	15	(2)
2016–2020	Barnsley	1	(0)
2017–2018	→ Tranmere Rovers (loan)	12	(1)
2018	→ Chesterfield (loan)	2	(0)
2018	→ Tranmere Rovers (loan)	12	(0)
2019	→ Harrogate Town (loan)	4	(0)
2020	Bradford City	7	(0)
2020–2021	Bradford City	11	(0)
2021	Larne	11	(2)
2021–2022	Bradford Park Avenue	28	(3)
2022–2024	South Shields	41	(8)
2023	→ Warrington Town (loan)	6	(2)
2023	→ Alfreton Town (loan)	6	(0)
2023–2024	→ Buxton (loan)	21	(4)
2024–2026	Chester	61	(14)
2025	→ FC United of Manchester (dual-registration)	5	(3)
2026–	Hednesford Town	0	(0)
- * Club domestic league appearances and goals as of 21:09, 29 April 2026 (UTC)

Dylan Mottley-Henry (born 2 August 1997) is an English professional footballer who plays as a winger for Hednesford Town.

== Career ==
=== Bradford City ===
Mottley-Henry played youth football for Bradford City, joining the first-team in November 2014. He made his senior debut for the club on 6 April 2015, appearing as a substitute in a league match. In May 2015 he was one of four youth players offered professional contracts with the club.

He moved on loan to Altrincham in January 2016, making six appearances. He joined Bradford Park Avenue on loan in February 2016, alongside Reece Webb-Foster.

=== Barnsley ===
He was released by Bradford City at the end of the 2015–16 season. He then went on trial with Barnsley in July 2016, signing a six-month contract with them later that month. He signed on loan for Tranmere Rovers in October 2017, and for Chesterfield in January 2018. He returned to Tranmere Rovers on loan in August 2018. He moved on loan to Harrogate Town in February 2019.

=== Return to Bradford City ===
After being released by Barnsley, Mottley-Henry re-signed for Bradford on a six-month contract on 30 January 2020. He quickly became a first-team regular under new manager Stuart McCall. He was released by the club on 30 April 2020, although the club said he might still be part of their plans after the COVID-19 pandemic ended and league football resumed. He was offered a new contract by Bradford City in July 2020, and he signed for the club for a third time later that month on a one-year deal. He said he appreciated McCall's faith in him, and that he wanted to become a first-team regular in the 2020–21 season. He suffered an injury in a pre-season friendly. On 31 January 2021 it was announced that he had left the club.

=== Later career ===
On 1 February 2021 he signed for Northern Ireland club Larne. In June 2021 it was announced that he would leave the club at the end of the month, following the expiry of his contract.

In September 2021 he returned to Bradford Park Avenue on a short-term deal.

In June 2022, Mottley-Henry joined Northern Premier League Premier Division club South Shields. After spending time on loan at Warrington Town and Alfreton Town, he signed on loan for Buxton in December 2023.

In October 2024, Mottley-Henry joined Chester. In January 2025, he joined FC United of Manchester on dual-registration.

In June 2026 he signed for Hednesford Town.

== Career statistics ==
As of 29 April 2026

Appearances and goals by club, season and competition
Club	Season	League			FA Cup		League Cup		Other		Total	
Club	Season	Division	Apps	Goals	Apps	Goals	Apps	Goals	Apps	Goals	Apps	Goals
Bradford City	2014–15	League One	1	0	0	0	0	0	0	0	1	0
Bradford City	2015–16	League One	1	0	0	0	0	0	0	0	1	0
Bradford City	Total		2	0	0	0	0	0	0	0	2	0
Altrincham (loan)	2015–16	National League	5	0	0	0	—		1 (Note: Appearance(s) in FA Trophy.)	0	6	0
Bradford Park Avenue (loan)	2015–16	National League North	15	2	0	0	—		0	0	15	2
Barnsley	2016–17	Championship	0	0	0	0	0	0	0	0	0	0
Barnsley	2017–18	Championship	1	0	0	0	0	0	0	0	1	0
Barnsley	2018–19	League One	0	0	0	0	0	0	0	0	0	0
Barnsley	Total		1	0	0	0	0	0	0	0	1	0
Tranmere Rovers (loan)	2017–18	National League	12	1	3	0	—		1	0	16	1
Chesterfield (loan)	2017–18	League Two	2	0	0	0	0	0	0	0	2	0
Tranmere Rovers (loan)	2018–19	League Two	12	0	2	0	0	0	3	0	17	0
Harrogate Town (loan)	2018–19	National League	4	0	0	0	—		0	0	4	0
Bradford City	2019–20	League Two	7	0	0	0	0	0	0	0	7	0
Bradford City	2020–21	League Two	11	0	2	0	1	0	3 (Note: Appearance(s) in EFL Trophy)	0	17	0
Larne	2020–21	NIFL Premiership	11	2	2	2	0	0	0	0	13	4
Bradford (Park Avenue)	2021–22	National League North	28	3	1	0	—		2	0	31	3
South Shields	2022–23	Northern Premier League Premier Division	41	8	5	5	—		0	0	46	13
South Shields	2023–24	National League North	0	0	0	0	—		0	0	0	0
South Shields	Total		41	8	5	5	0	0	0	0	46	13
Warrington Town (loan)	2023–24	National League North	6	2	1	1	—		0	0	7	3
Alfreton Town (loan)	2023–24	National League North	6	0	—		—		1	1	7	1
Buxton (loan)	2023–24	National League North	21	4	—		—		0	0	21	4
Chester	2024–25	National League North	19	2	1	0	—		3 (Note: Appearance(s) in National League North play-offs)	1	23	3
Chester	2025–26	National League North	42	12	5	2	—		1 (Note: Appearance(s) in National League North play-offs)	0	48	14
Chester	Total		61	14	6	2	—		4	1	71	17
FC United of Manchester (dual reg)	2024–25	NPL Premier Division	5	3	—		—		0	0	5	3
Career total			221	31	22	10	1	0	15	2	259	43

== Honours ==
South Shields

- Northern Premier League: 2022–23
