= Jak McCourt =

English footballer

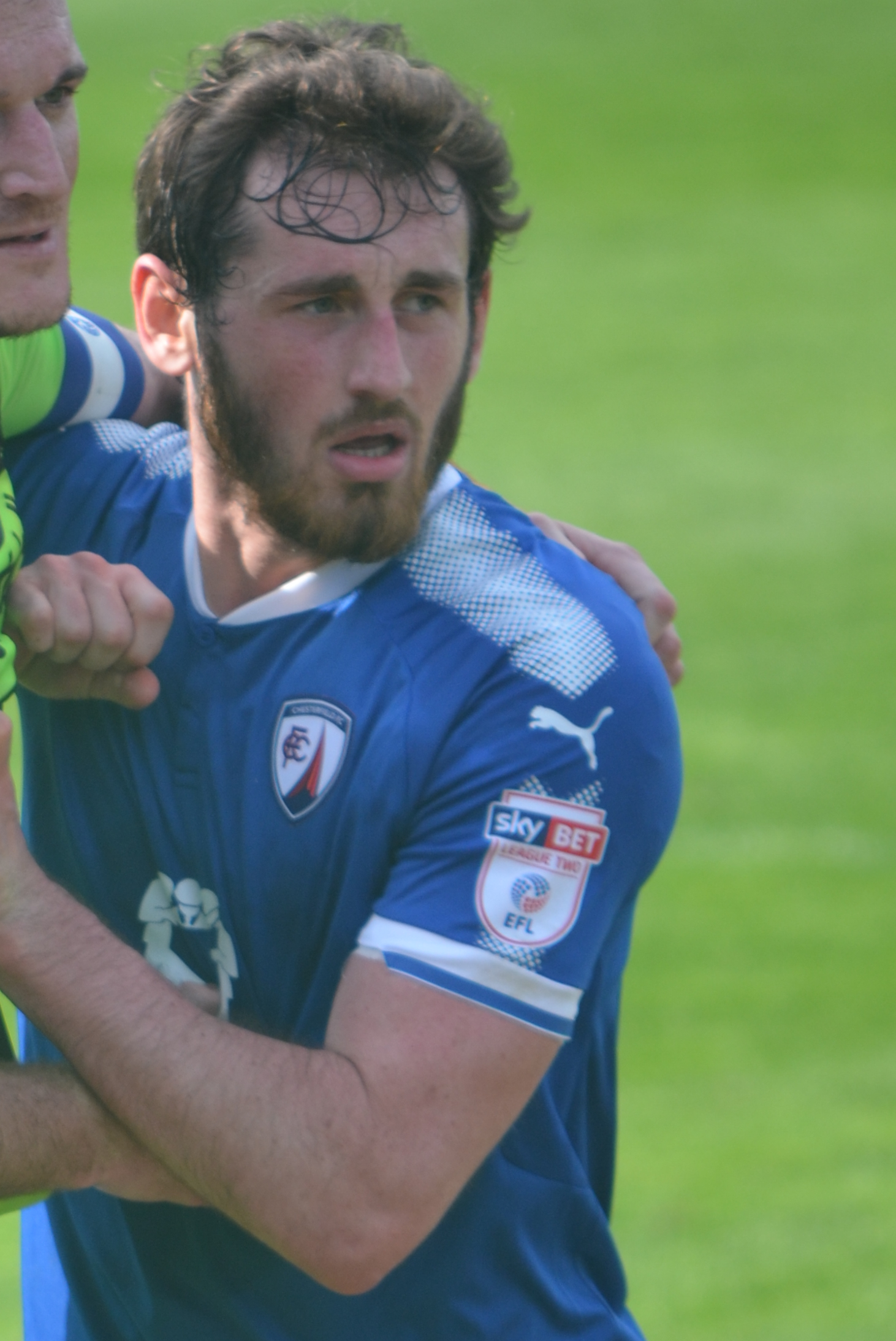
- McCourt playing for Chesterfield in 2018

Personal information
- Full name: Jak McCourt
- Date of birth: 6 July 1995 (age 31)
- Place of birth: Liverpool, England
- Height: 5 ft 10 in (1.78 m)
- Position: Midfielder

Team information
- Current team: Bradford (Park Avenue)

Youth career
- Leicester City

Senior career*
Years	Team	Apps	(Gls)
2013–2016	Leicester City	0	(0)
2013–2014	→ Torquay United (loan)	11	(0)
2015	→ Port Vale (loan)	2	(0)
2016	Barnsley	1	(0)
2016–2017	Northampton Town	26	(1)
2017–2018	Chesterfield	34	(5)
2018–2019	Swindon Town	27	(1)
2019–2020	Macclesfield Town	21	(2)
2020–2022	Chesterfield	41	(2)
2022–2023	Warrington Rylands 1906	20	(1)
2023–2024	Buxton	47	(7)
2024–	Ashton United	12	(0)
2024	→ Warrington Town (loan)	7	(0)
2025	→ Bradford (Park Avenue) (loan)	8	(1)
2025–	Bradford (Park Avenue)		
- * Club domestic league appearances and goals as of 21:33, 29 April 2026 (UTC)

Jak McCourt (born 6 July 1995) is an English professional footballer who plays as a midfielder for Northern Premier League Division One East club Bradford (Park Avenue).

McCourt began his career with Leicester City. McCourt spent part of the 2013–14 season on loan at Torquay United and then September 2015 on loan at Port Vale, before being sold to Barnsley in January 2016. An unused substitute in the club's victorious 2016 League One play-off final, he was released by Barnsley in June 2016 and subsequently joined Northampton Town. Northampton released him in July 2017 by mutual agreement and subsequently joined Chesterfield. He signed with Swindon Town in July 2018 and then moved on to Macclesfield Town in June 2019. Macclesfield Town were liquidated at the end of the 2019–20 season. He rejoined Chesterfield in December 2020 and signed with Warrington Rylands 1906 in June 2022. He joined Buxton in January 2023 and moved to Ashton United the following year. He had spells on loan at Warrington Town and Bradford (Park Avenue), before he joined Bradford (Park Avenue) permanently in July 2025.

== Career ==
=== Leicester City ===
McCourt began his career with Leicester City and signed a professional contract with the "Foxes" in May 2013. On 11 October 2013, he joined League Two side Torquay United on loan for a month. He made his professional debut the next day in a 3–2 to Wycombe Wanderers at Adams Park. On 9 December, McCourt's loan was extended by Torquay United until 4 January 2014. He returned to the King Power Stadium after making 12 appearances in all competitions for Alan Knill's "Gulls". The player signed a new one-year contract with Leicester City in June 2014.

McCourt joined League One side Port Vale on a one-month loan deal on 28 August 2015. Manager Rob Page said he made the signing as cover for the injured Michael Brown, who was the "Valiants" central midfield option on the bench. He started one Football League Trophy game and made two substitute appearances in the league.

=== Barnsley ===
McCourt was sold to League One club Barnsley for an undisclosed fee in January 2016; he signed a contract running until the end of the 2015–16 season. He played two games for Barnsley, both as substitute appearances from the bench, and was an unused substitute for the play-off final victory over Millwall at Wembley Stadium on 29 May. The club then released him upon the expiry of his contract in June.

=== Northampton Town ===
In June 2016, McCourt signed a two-year contract with League One club Northampton Town, in a move that reunited him with his former Port Vale boss Rob Page. However, he picked up a shoulder injury in pre-season training, which required surgery and an enforced two-month absence. He scored his first senior goal in a 1–1 draw with Scunthorpe United at Glanford Park on 8 October. He received his first sending off seven days later after picking up two yellow cards in a 3–1 defeat to Millwall at Sixfields Stadium. He was transfer-listed by new manager Justin Edinburgh in May 2017 after falling out of the first-team in the second half of the 2016–17 season.

=== Chesterfield ===
McCourt negotiated his release from Northampton and joined newly-relegated League Two side Chesterfield on a two-year deal in July 2017. He scored six goals in 39 appearances across the 2017–18 season as the "Spireites" were relegated out of the English Football League into the National League. He was made available for a free transfer by new manager Martin Allen in May 2018.

=== Swindon Town ===
On 17 July 2018, McCourt joined League Two side Swindon Town on a one-year contract. He was utilised as a holding midfielder by manager Phil Brown, before being moved further forward after Brown was replaced by Richie Wellens in November. He was released by Swindon at the end of the 2018–19 season.

=== Macclesfield Town ===
On 5 June 2019, McCourt joined League Two side Macclesfield Town on a one-year contract, becoming Sol Campbell's first summer signing as manager. He featured 21 times for the "Silkmen" during the 2019–20 season and was offered a new contract by new manager Mark Kennedy in the summer. Macclesfield were relegated at the end of the season after having a total of 17 points deducted and were liquidated in September 2020.

=== Return to Chesterfield ===
On 1 December 2020, McCourt rejoined Chesterfield, now in the National League, on a short-term contract. He said that he had unfinished business at the club after being at the Proact Stadium when the club lost its Football League status. He quickly impressed manager James Rowe and signed a new 18-month contract later in the month. Chesterfield qualified for the play-offs at the end of the 2020–21 season, though were beaten by Notts County at the quarter-final stage. Rowe was sacked in February 2022 and McCourt was returned to the first-team by caretaker manager Daniel Webb following a period of three months without an appearance. However, he picked up an ankle injury after being on the wrong end of a "horrific" tackle later that month. He recovered and was named on the substitute's bench by manager Paul Cook for the play-off semi-final defeat at Solihull Moors.

=== non-League ===
On 27 June 2022, McCourt signed for newly-promoted Northern Premier League Premier Division side Warrington Rylands 1906.

In January 2023, McCourt joined National League North club Buxton. He made 19 appearances in the second half of the 2022–23 season, scoring two goals. He scored five goals in 29 games throughout the 2023–24 campaign.

Having departed Buxton at the end of the 2023–24 season, McCourt joined Northern Premier League Premier Division club Ashton United.

In November 2024, he joined National League North side Warrington Town on a three-month loan deal. In January 2025, he joined Bradford (Park Avenue) on loan for the remainder of the 2024–25 season in the role of player-coach. He scored one goal in eight games for Bradford. He joined Bradford (Park Avenue) permanently on 12 June 2025. Park Avenue reached the final of the Northern Premier League Division One East play-offs, though McCourt missed his penalty in the shoot-out defeat to Emley.

== Style of play ==
McCourt is an athletic central midfielder with good passing skills. He has been described as a "larger than life character in the dressing room".

== Career statistics ==
As of match played 1 March 2025

Appearances and goals by club, season and competition
Club	Season	League			FA Cup		EFL Cup		Other		Total	
Club	Season	Division	Apps	Goals	Apps	Goals	Apps	Goals	Apps	Goals	Apps	Goals
Leicester City	2013–14	Championship	0	0	0	0	0	0	—		0	0
Leicester City	2014–15	Premier League	0	0	0	0	0	0	—		0	0
Leicester City	2015–16	Premier League	0	0	0	0	0	0	—		0	0
Leicester City	Total		0	0	0	0	0	0	0	0	0	0
Torquay United (loan)	2013–14	League Two	11	0	1	0	0	0	0	0	12	0
Port Vale (loan)	2015–16	League One	2	0	0	0	—		1 (Note: Appearance(s) in the Football League Trophy / EFL Trophy.)	0	3	0
Barnsley	2015–16	League One	1	0	—		—		1	0	2	0
Northampton Town	2016–17	League One	26	1	2	0	2	0	2	0	32	1
Chesterfield	2017–18	League Two	34	5	1	0	1	0	3	1	39	6
Swindon Town	2018–19	League Two	27	1	1	0	0	0	2	0	30	1
Macclesfield Town	2019–20	League Two	21	2	0	0	0	0	0	0	21	2
Chesterfield	2020–21	National League	19	2	0	0	—		3 (Note: 2 appearances in the FA Trophy and 1 appearance in the play-offs.)	0	22	2
Chesterfield	2021–22	National League	22	0	2	0	—		0	0	24	0
Chesterfield	Total		41	2	2	0	0	0	3	2	46	2
Warrington Rylands 1906	2022–23	Northern Premier League; Premier Division	20	1	0	0	—		2 (Note: Appearance(s) in FA Trophy)	0	22	1
Buxton	2022–23	National League North	19	2	0	0	—		0	0	19	2
Buxton	2023–24	National League North	28	5	0	0	—		1	0	29	5
Buxton	Total		47	7	0	0	0	0	1	0	48	7
Ashton United	2024–25	Northern Premier League; Premier Division	12	0	1	0	—		3 (Note: Two appearances and one goal in FA Trophy, one appearance in Manchester Premier Cup)	1	16	1
Warrington Town (loan)	2024–25	National League North	7	0	—		—		0	0	7	0
Bradford (Park Avenue) (loan)	2024–25	Northern Premier League; Division One East	8	1	—		—		0	0	8	1
Bradford (Park Avenue)	2025–26 (Note: Statistics for the 2025–26 season not known.)	Northern Premier League; Division One East										
Bradford (Park Avenue)	2026–27	Northern Premier League; Division One East	0	0	0	0	—		0	0	0	0
Career total			257	20	8	0	3	0	18	2	286	22

== Honours ==
Barnsley

- Football League One play-offs: 2016
