= Charlie Wakefield =

Charlie Wakefield is the name of:

- Charlie Wakefield (footballer, born 1998), English footballer for Chelsea and Coventry
- Charlie Wakefield (footballer, born 2000), English footballer for Chesterfield
