= Joe Rowley =

English footballer

Personal information
- Full name: Joe Rowley
- Date of birth: 3 June 1999 (age 27)
- Place of birth: Sheffield, England
- Height: 1.80 m (5 ft 11 in)
- Position: Midfielder

Team information
- Current team: Scunthorpe United
- Number: 11

Youth career
- –2017: Chesterfield

Senior career*
Years	Team	Apps	(Gls)
2017–2022	Chesterfield	101	(6)
2021	→ King's Lynn Town	9	(0)
2022–2024	AFC Fylde	43	(5)
2024–	Scunthorpe United	34	(1)

International career
2019	England C	2	(0)
- * Club domestic league appearances and goals as of 15:29, 13 August 2024 (UTC)

Joe Rowley (born 3 June 1999) is an English professional footballer who plays as a midfielder for National League club Scunthorpe United.

== Early life ==
Rowley attended Meadowhead Secondary School in Sheffield.

== Club career ==
Rowley started his career in Chesterfield's academy, joining the club at Under-15 level. He made his debut for the club on 25 March 2017, starting the EFL League One game against Rochdale, playing 74 minutes of the 3–1 loss. On 7 April 2017, Rowley signed his first professional contract with the 'Spireites'. Rowley scored his first goal for the club a day later, scoring the winner in a 1–0 victory over Port Vale. Rowley was released at the end of the 2021–22 season.

In June 2022, Rowley joined National League North club AFC Fylde on a one-year deal, with the option for a further year, linking up with his former manager at Chesterfield James Rowe. He left the club at the end of the 2023–24 season.

In July 2024, after a successful trial, Rowley joined fellow National League North team Scunthorpe United.

== International career ==
On 18 March 2019, Rowley was called up to the England C squad.

== Career statistics ==
As of match played 2 April 2022

Appearances and goals by club, season and competition
Club	Season	League			FA Cup		EFL Cup		Other		Total	
Club	Season	Division	Apps	Goals	Apps	Goals	Apps	Goals	Apps	Goals	Apps	Goals
Chesterfield	2016–17	League One	7	1	0	0	0	0	0	0	7	1
Chesterfield	2017–18	League Two	28	3	1	0	0	0	3 (Note: Appearances in EFL Trophy)	1	32	4
Chesterfield	2018–19	National League	25	1	4	0	—		3 (Note: Appearance(s) in FA Trophy)	0	32	1
Chesterfield	2019–20	National League	23	1	2	0	—		1	0	26	1
Chesterfield	2020–21	National League	11	0	0	0	—		1	0	12	0
Chesterfield	2021–22	National League	6	0	0	0	—		0	0	6	0
Chesterfield	Total		100	6	7	0	0	0	8	1	115	7
King's Lynn Town (loan)	2021–22	National League	9	0	0	0	—		0	0	9	0
Career total			109	6	7	0	0	0	8	1	124	7

== Honours ==
Scunthorpe United

- National League North play-offs: 2025
