= Jack Brownell =

English footballer

Personal information
- Full name: Jack Thomas Brownell
- Date of birth: 30 August 1999 (age 27)
- Place of birth: Sheffield, England
- Position: Midfielder

Team information
- Current team: Hallam

Youth career
- –2017: Chesterfield

Senior career*
Years	Team	Apps	(Gls)
2017–2018	Chesterfield	1	(0)
2018	Matlock Town		
2018–2019	Spalding United		
2019–2020	Worksop Town	26	(0)
2020–	Hallam		
- * Club domestic league appearances and goals as of 19 April 2025 (UTC)

Jack Thomas Brownell (born 3 August 1999) is an English footballer who plays as a right back for Hallam FC.

== Career ==
Brownell joined Chesterfield at U16 level and signed a professional contract with the club in April 2017. His contract was not renewed by Chesterfield at the end of the 2017–18 season.

Brownell joined Spalding United in September 2018 and subsequently moved to Worksop Town FC prior to his transfer to Hallam FC in 2020.

== Career statistics ==
As of match played 23 April 2017

Appearances and goals by club, season and competition
Club	Season	League			FA Cup		League Cup		Other		Total	
Club	Season	Division	Apps	Goals	Apps	Goals	Apps	Goals	Apps	Goals	Apps	Goals
Chesterfield	2016–17	League One	1	0	0	0	0	0	0	0	1	0
Chesterfield	2017–18	League Two	0	0	0	0	0	0	0	0	0	0
Worksop Town	2019–20	NPL Division One South East	26	0	0	0	–		5 (Note: 3 appearances in Northern Premier League Challenge Cup, 1 appearance in FA Trophy, 1 appearance in Sheffield & Hallamshire Senior Cup)	0	31	0
Career total			27	0	0	0	0	0	5	0	32	0
