= Luke Rawson =

English footballer

Personal information
- Full name: Luke Rawson
- Date of birth: 25 March 2001 (age 25)
- Place of birth: Chesterfield, England
- Position: Forward

Team information
- Current team: Stocksbridge Park Steels

Youth career
- –2018: Chesterfield

Senior career*
Years	Team	Apps	(Gls)
2018–2021	Chesterfield	11	(2)
2018	→ Matlock Town (loan)	3	(0)
2018	→ Sheffield (loan)	2	(1)
2019	→ Sheffield (loan)	14	(4)
2019	→ Matlock Town (loan)	1	(0)
2019–2020	→ Brighouse Town (loan)	12	(4)
2020	→ Handsworth (loan)	6	(5)
2020	→ Alfreton Town (loan)	2	(1)
2021	→ Bradford (Park Avenue) (loan)	1	(0)
2021–2022	Bradford (Park Avenue)	19	(4)
2022	→ Sheffield (loan)	14	(1)
2022–2024	Stocksbridge Park Steels	67	(18)
2024–2025	Belper Town	29	(10)
2025–	Stocksbridge Park Steels	13	(8)
- * Club domestic league appearances and goals as of 19:35, 13 July 2025 (UTC)

Luke Rawson (born 25 March 2001) is an English footballer who plays as a forward for Northern Premier League Division One East club Stocksbridge Park Steels.

== Career ==
=== Chesterfield ===
Rawson played for Chesterfield's youth team, hitting headlines when he scored for the team's reserves as a 16-year-old in 2017. He made his senior debut for the 'Spireites' in their final EFL League Two game of the 2017–18 season while still a first-year scholar, coming off the bench as an 82nd minute substitute for captain Drew Talbot.

In September 2018, Rawson joined Matlock Town on a one-month loan deal. He joined Sheffield on loan in December, before returning to Chesterfield to make two appearances. He rejoined Sheffield on loan in January 2019.

In August 2019, Rawson once again joined Matlock town on a one-month loan deal.

On 14 October 2019, Rawson joined Brighouse Town on loan until January 2020. On 31 January 2020, he was then loaned out to Handsworth until 28 April 2020.

On 12 December 2020, Rawson joined National League North side Alfreton Town on loan for a month. On 19 January, Rawson joined fellow National League North side Bradford (Park Avenue) on a five-week loan deal.

=== Bradford (Park Avenue) ===
On 2 August 2021, Rawson returned to National League North side Bradford (Park Avenue), this time on a permanent deal following his release from Chesterfield. On 28 January 2022, he was sent out again to Sheffield, dropping down two divisions to play in the Northern Premier League Division One East for a month-long loan. In February, this loan was extended until the end of the season.

=== Stocksbridge Park Steels ===
In July 2022, Rawson signed for Stocksbridge Park Steels.

=== Belper Town ===
In June 2024, Rawson joined Belper Town.

=== Return to Stocksbridge Park Steels ===
In February 2025, Rawson returned to Stocksbridge Park Steels. Having helped the club to promotion through the play-offs, he signed a new deal ahead of the 2025–26 season.

== Career statistics ==
As of end of 2024–25 season

Club	Season	Division	League		FA Cup		Other		Total	
Club	Season	Division	Apps	Goals	Apps	Goals	Apps	Goals	Apps	Goals
Chesterfield	2017–18	League Two	1	0	0	0	0	0	1	0
Chesterfield	2018–19	National League	2	0	0	0	0	0	2	0
Chesterfield	2019–20	National League	0	0	0	0	0	0	0	0
Chesterfield	2020–21	National League	8	2	1	0	0	0	9	2
Chesterfield	Total		11	2	1	0	0	0	12	2
Matlock Town (loan)	2018–19	Northern Premier League Premier Division	3	0	1	0	0	0	4	0
Sheffield (loan)	2018–19	Northern Premier League Division One East	16	5	0	0	1 (Note: Appearances in Northern Premier League Division One East play-offs)	0	17	5
Matlock Town (loan)	2019–20	Northern Premier League Premier Division	1	0	1	0	0	0	2	0
Brighouse Town (loan)	2019–20	Northern Premier Division One North West	12	4	0	0	2 (Note: One appearance in FA Trophy, one appearance one goal in Northern Premier League Challenge Cup)	1	14	5
Handsworth (loan)	2019–20	Northern Counties East League Premier Division	6	5	0	0	0	0	6	5
Alfreton Town (loan)	2020–21	National League North	2	1	0	0	1 (Note: Appearances in FA Trophy)	0	3	1
Bradford (Park Avenue)	2020–21 (Note: This season was spent on loan from Chesterfield)	National League North	1	0	0	0	0	0	1	0
Bradford (Park Avenue)	2021–22	National League North	19	4	0	0	1	0	20	4
Bradford (Park Avenue)	Total		20	4	0	0	1	0	21	4
Sheffield (loan)	2021–22	Northern Premier League Division One East	14	1	0	0	0	0	14	1
Stocksbridge Park Steels	2022–23	Northern Premier League Division One East	29	6	7	2	4 (Note: One appearance one goal in FA Trophy, two appearances in Sheffield & Hallamshire Senior Cup, one appearance in Northern Premier League Division One East play-offs)	1	40	9
Stocksbridge Park Steels	2023–24	Northern Premier League Division One East	38	12	1	0	7 (Note: Three appearances and three goals in FA Trophy, four appearances and two goals in Sheffield & Hallamshire Senior Cup)	5	46	17
Stocksbridge Park Steels	Total		67	18	8	2	11	6	86	26
Belper Town	2024–25	Northern Premier League Division One East	29	10	3	0	6 (Note: Four appearances in FA Trophy, two appearances in Derbyshire Senior Cup)	0	38	10
Stocksbridge Park Steels	2024–25	Northern Premier League Division One East	13	8	0	0	3 (Note: One appearance in Sheffield & Hallamshire Senior Cup, two appearances and one goal in Northern Premier League Division One East play-offs)	1	16	9
Career total			194	58	14	2	25	8	233	68

== Honours ==
Stocksbridge Park Steels

- Northern Premier League Division One East play-offs: 2024–25
