= Ricky German =

Grenadian footballer

Personal information
- Full name: Ricardo de Niro German
- Date of birth: 13 January 1999 (age 27)
- Place of birth: Harlesden, England
- Height: 5 ft 11 in (1.80 m)
- Position: Striker

Team information
- Current team: Maidstone United (on loan from Hemel Hempstead Town)

Youth career
- –2016: Chesterfield

Senior career*
Years	Team	Apps	(Gls)
2016–2018	Chesterfield	9	(0)
2017	→ Alfreton Town (loan)	6	(1)
2017	→ Sheffield (loan)	3	(1)
2017	→ Matlock Town (loan)	4	(2)
2018	→ Matlock Town (loan)	13	(3)
2018–2019	Hendon	20	(16)
2019–2022	Crawley Town	16	(1)
2019–2020	→ Hemel Hempstead Town (loan)	14	(4)
2021	→ Dulwich Hamlet (loan)	3	(0)
2022	→ Hendon (loan)	2	(0)
2022–2024	Chesham United	61	(42)
2024–	Hemel Hempstead Town	21	(6)
2025–	→ Maidstone United (loan)	5	(0)

International career^{‡}
2021–	Grenada	3	(0)
- * Club domestic league appearances and goals as of 19:35, 25 February 2025 (UTC) ‡ National team caps and goals as of 02:53, 20 September 2022 (UTC)

Ricardo de Niro German (born 13 January 1999) is a professional footballer who plays as a striker for Maidstone United on loan from Hemel Hempstead Town. Born in England, he plays for the Grenada national team.

== Early life and education ==
German was born in Harlesden, and attended St Gregory's Catholic Science College in Harrow.

== Club career ==
=== Chesterfield ===
German started his career in the academy of Chesterfield, and made his senior team debut on 17 September 2016 against Northampton Town, being subbed on after 89 minutes for Kristian Dennis, whilst still an academy player. He eventually signed professional terms on 10 October 2016, with manager Danny Wilson saying he could potentially be 'very good'. On 25 August 2017, German joined National League North side Alfreton Town on a one-month loan deal. On 22 September 2017, his loan was extended by a further two months. German joined Sheffield on loan on 16 October 2017. He joined Matlock Town on a one-month loan on 10 November 2017, before signing rejoining on loan to the end of the season on 16 February 2018.

=== Hendon ===
In the summer of 2018, German moved to Southern League Premier South side Hendon. German scored 21 goals in 28 appearances for Hendon.

=== Crawley Town ===
On 1 January 2019, German secured a move to League Two side, Crawley Town on a three-year deal. On 19 January 2019, he made his debut for Crawley, coming on as an 83rd minute substitute for Panutche Camará in a 1–0 defeat at home to Port Vale.

On 26 July 2019, German completed a loan move to non-league side Hemel Hempstead Town. German returned from his loan spell at Hemel Hempstead Town in January 2020. He scored his first goal for Crawley with his first league start for Crawley, scoring the opening goal for Crawley in a 3–0 win against Oldham Athletic on 7 March 2020.

In October 2021, he joined National League South club Dulwich Hamlet on loan until January 2022. On 4 February 2022, he was on the move again when he returned to former club Hendon on a one-month loan deal in the Southern League Premier Division South. German was released at the end of the 2021–22 season.

=== Chesham United ===
On 5 August 2022, German signed for Southern Premier League South side Chesham United.

=== Hemel Hempstead Town ===
In May 2024, German returned to National League South club Hemel Hempstead Town on a permanent basis.

In January 2025, German joined National League South side Maidstone United on loan.

== International career ==
Born in England, German is of Grenadian descent. In November 2019, he was called up for the Grenada national football team. He debuted for Grenada in a 1–0 2022 FIFA World Cup qualification loss to Antigua and Barbuda on 4 June 2021. He was named as part of Grenada's squad for the 2021 CONCACAF Gold Cup.

== Personal life ==
German is the younger brother of Antonio German, who is also a footballer whom represents the Grenada national football team.

== Career statistics ==
=== Club ===
As of match played 8 February 2022

Appearances and goals by club, season and competition
Club	Season	League			FA Cup		League Cup		Other		Total	
Club	Season	Division	Apps	Goals	Apps	Goals	Apps	Goals	Apps	Goals	Apps	Goals
Chesterfield	2016–17	League One	7	0	0	0	0	0	2 (Note: Appearance(s) in Football League Trophy)	0	9	0
Chesterfield	2017–18	League Two	2	0	0	0	1	0	0	0	3	0
Chesterfield	Total		9	0	0	0	1	0	2	0	12	0
Alfreton Town (loan)	2017–18	National League North	6	1	3	1	—		0	0	9	2
Sheffield (loan)	2017–18	Northern Premier League Division One South	3	1	0	0	—		0	0	3	1
Matlock Town (loan)	2017–18	Northern Premier League Premier Division	17	5	0	0	—		1 (Note: Appearance(s) in Northern Premier League Challenge Cup)	0	18	5
Hendon	2018–19	Southern League Premier Division South	20	16	5	4	—		3 (Note: Two appearances in FA Trophy, one appearance one goal in Middlesex Senior Cup)	1	28	21
Crawley Town	2018–19	League Two	4	0	0	0	0	0	0	0	4	0
Crawley Town	2019–20	League Two	8	1	0	0	0	0	0	0	8	1
Crawley Town	2020–21	League Two	4	0	0	0	1	0	2	0	7	0
Crawley Town	2021–22	League Two	0	0	0	0	0	0	0	0	0	0
Crawley Town	Total		16	1	0	0	1	0	2	0	19	1
Hemel Hempstead Town (loan)	2019–20	National League South	14	4	1	0	—		2 (Note: One appearance in FA Trophy; one appearance one goal in Hertfordshire Charity Cup)	1	17	5
Dulwich Hamlet (loan)	2021–22	National League South	3	0	0	0	—		1 (Note: Appearance(s) in FA Trophy)	0	4	0
Hendon (loan)	2021–22	Southern League Premier Division South	2	0	0	0	—		0	0	2	0
Career total			90	28	9	5	2	0	11	2	112	35

=== International ===
As of match played 17 July 2021

Appearances and goals by national team and year
National team	Year	Apps	Goals
Grenada	2021	3	0
Total		3	0
