= Delial Brewster =

English footballer

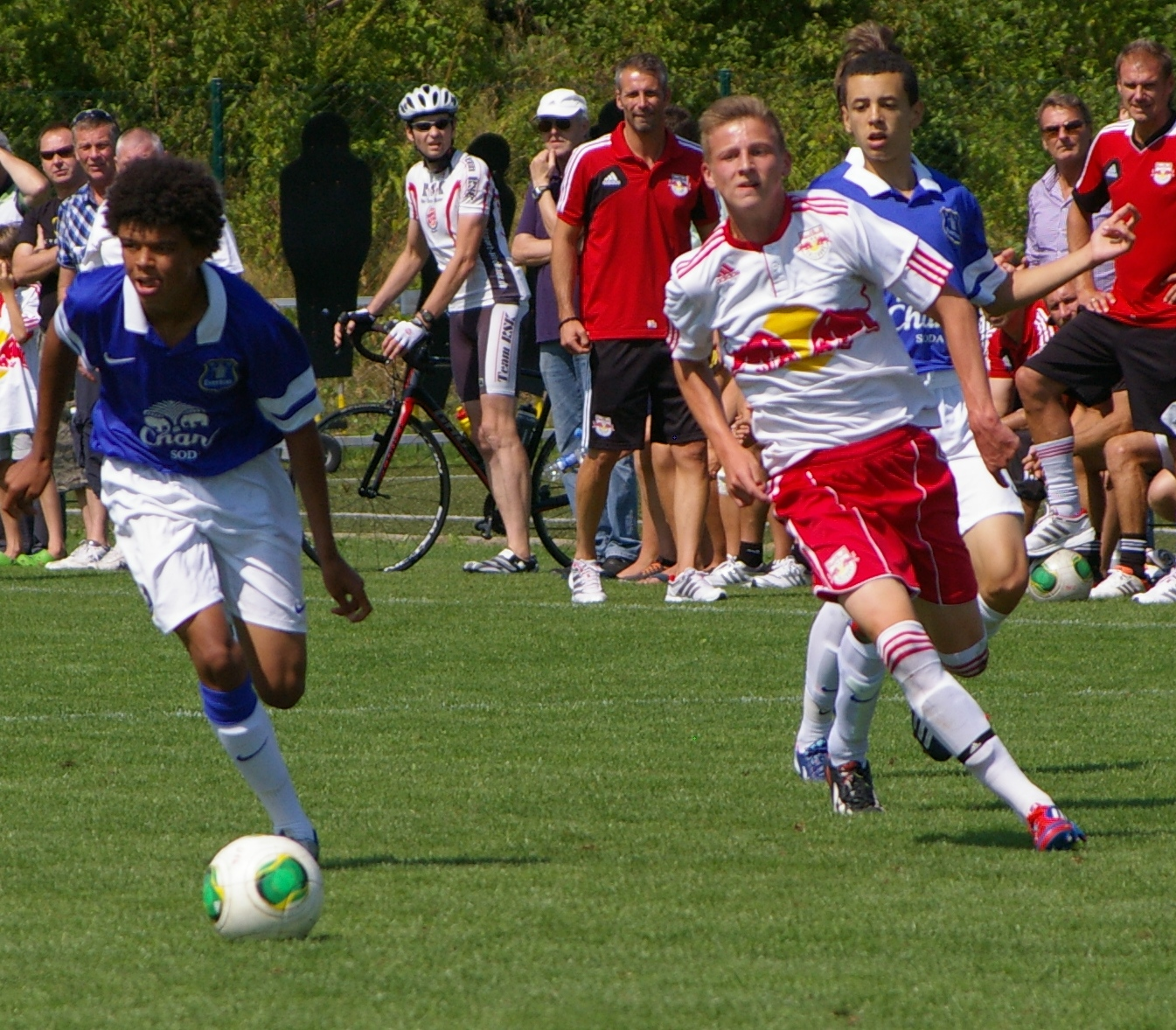
- Brewster (left) playing for Everton in 2013.

Personal information
- Date of birth: 7 November 1997 (age 29)
- Place of birth: Southport, England
- Position: Forward

Youth career
- Liverpool
- 2010–2015: Everton

Senior career*
Years	Team	Apps	(Gls)
2015–2017	Everton	0	(0)
2015–2016	→ Stockport County (loan)	5	(2)
2017	→ Southport (loan)	3	(1)
2017–2018	Chesterfield	2	(0)
2018	→ Chorley (loan)	7	(0)
2018–2019	Witton Albion	8	(0)
2023–2024	Burscough		
- * Club domestic league appearances and goals as of 12:30, 22 February 2019 (UTC)

Delial Brewster (born 7 November 1997) is an English footballer who plays as a forward.

An athletic attacker, he began his professional career with Everton in July 2015. He did not make a first team appearance for the club, but did play on loan at non-league sides Stockport County and Southport. He signed with Chesterfield in June 2017.

== Playing career ==
=== Everton ===
Brewster switched from the Academy at Liverpool to the Academy at Everton at the age of 12. He signed his first professional contract, to run for two years, in July 2015. On 22 December 2015, he joined Stockport County on loan in the National League North. He scored on his senior debut four days later, in a 2–1 defeat to Harrogate Town at Edgeley Park. He scored two goals in five matches for Neil Young's "Hatters".

He made two substitute appearances for Everton U23s in the EFL Trophy early in the 2016–17 season. On 1 January 2017, he joined National League club Southport on loan until the end of the 2016–17 season. The loan spell was cut short on 19 February after he was not named in a matchday squad for six games following Andy Preece succession of manager Steve Burr. He was released by Everton in June 2017.

=== Chesterfield ===
On 15 June 2017, he signed with newly relegated EFL League Two side Chesterfield. On 9 January 2018, he joined National League North side Chorley on loan until the end of the season. On 18 June 2018, he left Chesterfield by mutual consent.

He spent the start of the 2018/19 season playing for Northern Premier League Premier Division side Witton Albion making 13 appearances in all competitions before leaving the club in January 2019.

In July 2023, Brewster joined North West Counties League side Burscough.

== Style of play ==
The Everton club website described Brewster as a forward with "power, pace and an eye for goal".

== Statistics ==
As of end of 2017–18 season

Club	Season	Division	League		FA Cup		EFL Cup		Other		Total	
Club	Season	Division	Apps	Goals	Apps	Goals	Apps	Goals	Apps	Goals	Apps	Goals
Everton	2015–16	Premier League	0	0	0	0	0	0	—		0	0
Everton	2016–17	Premier League	0	0	0	0	0	0	—		0	0
Everton	Total		0	0	0	0	0	0	—		0	0
Stockport County (loan)	2015–16	National League North	5	2	0	0	—		0	0	5	2
Everton U21s	2016–17	—			—		—		2 (Note: Appearances in EFL Trophy)	0	2	0
Southport (loan)	2016–17	National League	3	1	0	0	—		0	0	3	1
Chesterfield	2017–18	League Two	2	0	0	0	1	0	0	0	3	0
Chorley (loan)	2017–18	National League North	7	0	0	0	—		0	0	7	0
Career total			17	3	0	0	1	0	2	0	20	3
