= Marshall Willock =

Montserratian association football player

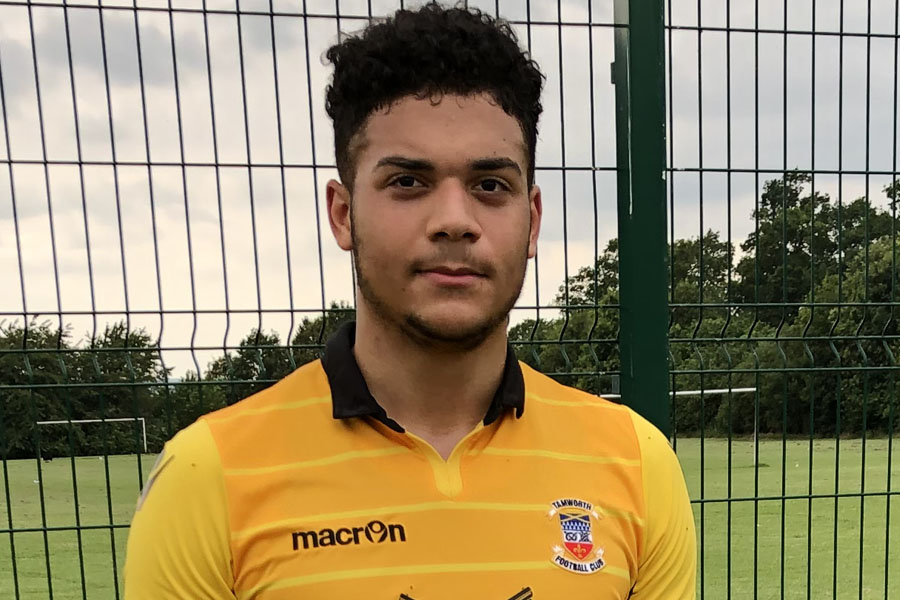
- Willock in July 2019

Personal information
- Full name: Marshall Jake Willock
- Date of birth: 7 April 2000 (age 26)
- Place of birth: Birmingham, England
- Position: Defender

Team information
- Current team: Stamford

Youth career
- –2017: Solihull Moors
- 2017–2018: Chesterfield

Senior career*
Years	Team	Apps	(Gls)
2017	Solihull Moors	0	(0)
2017	→ Bromsgrove Sporting (loan)	1	(0)
2017–2018	Chesterfield	0	(0)
2017	→ Kettering Town (loan)	6	(0)
2018–2019	Solihull Moors	1	(0)
2018	→ Redditch United (loan)	2	(0)
2019	Redditch United	1	(0)
2019–2020	Peterborough Sports	5	(1)
2020	Grantham Town	5	(1)
2020–2021	Kemi City	7	(0)
2021	Racing Club Warwick	0	(0)
2021–2022	Stourbridge	5	(0)
2022	Stamford	9	(0)
2022	Ilkeston Town	?	(?)
2022–	Stamford	5	(2)

International career^{‡}
2019–2021	Montserrat	3	(0)
- * Club domestic league appearances and goals as of 12:14, 5 February 2023 (UTC) ‡ National team caps and goals as of 15:11, 3 July 2021 (UTC)

Marshall Jake Willock (born 7 April 2000) is a footballer who plays as a defender for Stamford and the Montserrat national team.

== Playing career ==
Marshall began the 2019–20 season on trial with Southern League Premier Division Central side Tamworth. Willock appeared in pre-season friendly games against West Bromwich Albion, Leicester Nirvana and Bilston Town, however a permanent move never materialised. Willock did manage to earn a move to Redditch United, a team he had spent time on loan with the previous season.

Willock signed for Peterborough Sports on 17 September 2019, and made his debut on the same day. Marshall helped his new club to an emphatic 9–0 victory away to local rivals Peterborough Northern Star in the Northants FA Hillier Senior Cup. Willock made his Southern League Premier Division Central debut on 28 September 2019 in a home fixture against Leiston, Marshall came on as a substitute and scored on his debut, helping his new club to an 8–1 victory.

Following a lack of first team opportunities at Peterborough Sports, Willock signed for Northern Premier League Premier Division side Grantham Town on 17 January 2020.

On 31 July 2020, Willock joined Finnish Kakkonen side Kemi City on a two-year deal.

== International career ==
=== Montserrat ===
Marshall was called up to the Montserrat national team for the Nations League B in September 2019, for the first two matches of the competition, at 2–1 victory at home to the Dominican Republic on 7 September 2019 and a 1–1 draw at home to Saint Lucia on 10 September 2019, saw Willock named in both matches as an unused substitute.

Marshall did however earn his first international cap playing for Montserrat on 16 November 2019, coming on as a substitute in a Nations League B fixture away to El Salvador. Willock earned his second cap on 20 November 2019, coming on as a 90th minute substitute for Massiah McDonald in a Nations League B fixture away to Saint Lucia.
