= Charlie Wakefield (footballer, born 2000) =

English footballer

Personal information
- Full name: Charlie George Wakefield
- Date of birth: 23 May 2000 (age 26)
- Place of birth: Derby, England
- Height: 1.75 m (5 ft 9 in)
- Position: Midfielder

Team information
- Current team: Shepshed Dynamo

Youth career
- 2010–2017: Chesterfield

Senior career*
Years	Team	Apps	(Gls)
2017–2020	Chesterfield	5	(0)
2018	→ Sheffield (loan)		
2020	→ Matlock Town (loan)		
2020–2021	Buxton	2	(0)
2021–2023	Ilkeston Town		
2023	Basford United	13	(1)
2023–	Shepshed Dynamo	0	(0)
- * Club domestic league appearances and goals as of 17:04,, 21 December 2023 (UTC)

Charlie George Wakefield (born 23 May 2000) is an English professional footballer who plays as a midfielder for Northern Premier League Division One Midlands club Shepshed Dynamo.

== Club career ==
Wakefield started his career in the academy of Chesterfield, and made his debut in the senior team on 17 April 2017, in a 3–1 loss to Scunthorpe United in EFL League One, a result that sealed the club's relegation to EFL League Two. He signed his first professional contract in the summer.

On 20 August 2018, Wakefield was loaned to Sheffield, in order to obtain some first-team experience. He was recalled by the club in October, with manager Martin Allen citing Wakefield's dropping to the bench following scoring a goal in the previous match against Worksop Town as reason for his return. In March 2020, he joined Matlock Town on a one-month loan deal. He left Chesterfield in the summer of 2020 after ten years with the club.

In October 2020, Wakefield joined Northern Premier League side Buxton.

He signed for Northern Premier League Division One Midlands side Ilkeston Town on a free transfer in August 2021.

In May 2023, Wakefield joined Basford United, before moving to Shepshed Dynamo in December 2023.

== Career statistics ==
As of match played 20 June 2020

Appearances and goals by club, season and competition
Club	Season	League			FA Cup		EFL Cup		Other		Total	
Club	Season	Division	Apps	Goals	Apps	Goals	Apps	Goals	Apps	Goals	Apps	Goals
Chesterfield	2016–17	League One	1	0	0	0	0	0	0	0	1	0
Chesterfield	2017–18	League Two	1	0	0	0	0	0	2 (Note: Appearance(s) in the EFL Trophy)	0	3	0
Chesterfield	2018–19	National League	0	0	0	0	—		0	0	0	0
Chesterfield	2019–20	National League	3	0	1	0	—		1 (Note: Appearance(s) in the FA Trophy)	0	5	0
Career total			5	0	1	0	0	0	3	0	9	0
