= 2024–25 Northern Premier League =

The 2024–25 season was the 57th season of the Northern Premier League. The league consists of four divisions, the Premier Division at Step 3 of the National League System, and the West, East and Midlands divisions at Step 4.

== Premier Division ==
Northern Premier League Premier Division
- Season: 2024–25
- Champions: Macclesfield
- Promoted: Macclesfield; Worksop Town
- Relegated: Matlock Town; Mickleover; Basford United; Blyth Spartans

The Premier Division consists of 22 teams, 16 from the previous season and six new teams.

=== Team changes ===
To the Premier Division

Promoted from Division One East

- Hebburn Town
- Stockton Town

Promoted from Division One West

- Leek Town
- Prescot Cables

Relegated from the National League North

- Blyth Spartans

Transferred from the Southern Football League Premier Division Central

- Mickleover

From the Premier Division

Promoted to the National League North

- Marine
- Radcliffe

Relegated to Division One East

- Bradford (Park Avenue)

Relegated to Division One West

- Atherton Collieries
- Stafford Rangers

Resigned to the Northern Football League Division One

- Marske United

=== Premier Division table ===
Pos	Team	Pld	W	D	L	GF	GA	GD	Pts	Promotion, qualification or relegation
1	Macclesfield (C, P)	42	35	4	3	109	30	+79	109	Promotion to the National League North
2	Worksop Town (O, P)	42	26	5	11	96	51	+45	83	Qualification for the play-offs (Note: Four teams play for one spot and promotion to the National League North)
3	Stockton Town	42	23	6	13	66	47	+19	75 (Note: Stockton Town were disqualified from the play-off final for fielding an ineligible player against Guiseley in their semi-final.)	Qualification for the play-offs
4	Guiseley	42	20	14	8	67	45	+22	74	Qualification for the play-offs
5	Ashton United	42	20	9	13	72	58	+14	69	Qualification for the play-offs
6	Ilkeston Town	42	18	12	12	69	56	+13	66	
7	Gainsborough Trinity	42	18	10	14	58	53	+5	64	
8	Morpeth Town	42	16	14	12	57	61	−4	62	
9	Hyde United	42	14	15	13	59	63	−4	57	
10	Prescot Cables	42	16	9	17	49	54	−5	57	
11	Warrington Rylands 1906	42	14	14	14	60	53	+7	56	
12	Workington	42	15	7	20	61	65	−4	52	
13	Bamber Bridge	42	15	7	20	65	70	−5	52	
14	Hebburn Town	42	13	13	16	60	65	−5	52	
15	Leek Town	42	14	10	18	47	55	−8	52	
16	Whitby Town	42	15	7	20	55	71	−16	52	
17	FC United of Manchester	42	12	15	15	55	62	−7	51	
18	Lancaster City	42	12	15	15	52	63	−11	51	
19	Matlock Town (R)	42	10	15	17	59	69	−10	42 (Note: Matlock Town were deducted three points for fielding an ineligible player against Hyde United.)	Relegation to Division One East
20	Mickleover (R)	42	10	9	23	41	75	−34	39	Relegation to Division One Midlands
21	Basford United (R)	42	10	7	25	50	79	−29	37	Relegation to Division One Midlands
22	Blyth Spartans (R)	42	3	9	30	38	100	−62	18	Relegation to Division One East

Source: NPL official site
Rules for classification: 1) points; 2) goal difference; 3) number of goals scored; 4) number of matches won; 5) head-to-head results
(C) Champions; (O) Play-off winners; (P) Promoted; (R) Relegated

=== Play-offs ===
Semi-finals
2	Worksop Town	2
5	Ashton United	1
3	Stockton Town	1
4	Guiseley	0 (Note: Despite losing, Guiseley advanced to the playoff final after Stockton Town were disqualified for using an ineligible player.)

Final
2	Worksop Town	2
4	Guiseley	1

==== Semi-finals ====
29 April	Stockton Town	1–0	Guiseley	Stockton-on-Tees
19:45	Hayes 66'	Report	Lufudu (yellow card) 90+5' (yellow-red card) 90+6'	Stadium: Bishopton Road West; Attendance: 2,125; Referee: Alex Clark

29 April	Worksop Town	2–1	Ashton United	Worksop
19:45	Hughes 30'; Burrow 76'	Report	Gilchrist 59'	Stadium: Sandy Lane; Attendance: 1,756; Referee: Gareth Davis

==== Final ====
5 May	Worksop Town	2–1	Guiseley	Worksop
	Burrow 45+3', 55'		Longbottom 74'	Stadium: Sandy Lane; Attendance: 2,032; Referee: Zachary Cunningham

=== Results table ===
Home \ Away	ASH	BAM	BAS	BLY	UOM	GAI	GUI	HEB	HYD	ILK	LNC	LEE	MAC	MAT	MIC	MOR	PRE	STO	WRY	WHI	WRK	WOR
Ashton United	—	0–0	4–3	2–2	2–0	0–2	2–4	5–1	1–1	2–1	2–1	1–0	1–0	3–2	2–0	0–1	0–3	0–1	1–1	5–0	3–0	2–3
Bamber Bridge	2–1	—	1–0	5–1	4–0	1–0	2–3	2–1	1–2	1–2	2–3	3–1	0–2	3–0	2–2	1–2	4–2	1–5	0–4	0–2	1–2	0–0
Basford United	1–2	3–2	—	3–1	1–2	1–1	0–2	2–2	1–2	2–1	0–4	0–1	1–5	2–1	0–2	4–0	1–1	2–1	1–1	3–4	2–1	1–3
Blyth Spartans	0–3	1–1	0–2	—	2–2	1–2	0–2	0–1	0–1	1–1	1–1	1–1	0–5	0–4	2–1	1–4	3–3	0–1	1–3	3–4	1–0	2–3
FC United of Manchester	1–2	3–2	0–1	2–1	—	1–1	1–1	1–2	1–1	1–1	2–3	2–5	1–2	1–1	2–1	4–1	4–0	0–1	2–2	2–3	2–2	0–1
Gainsborough Trinity	0–1	2–1	0–3	5–1	0–1	—	0–2	3–1	2–1	0–0	1–2	2–1	0–4	1–1	0–0	3–1	2–3	1–1	3–1	2–1	3–0	0–2
Guiseley	1–0	3–1	1–0	0–0	3–2	0–2	—	2–0	4–0	1–1	1–2	1–1	0–3	1–1	3–0	3–3	2–0	1–1	2–2	3–1	2–0	1–2
Hebburn Town	1–1	5–1	1–1	3–1	1–1	2–1	0–1	—	0–2	1–2	2–1	0–1	1–1	0–2	1–1	2–3	2–0	2–0	1–0	2–6	3–1	2–3
Hyde United	1–1	1–1	2–1	3–2	2–3	1–1	1–1	1–3	—	3–1	1–0	0–0	2–5	0–4	1–1	1–1	1–2	4–1	0–2	1–1	3–2	2–0
Ilkeston Town	2–2	2–1	5–0	3–0	1–1	2–2	1–1	2–1	3–2	—	4–0	0–2	1–1	1–1	1–0	4–2	1–1	1–2	2–1	5–1	1–0	3–0
Lancaster City	2–2	1–4	3–2	3–2	0–1	1–2	1–1	2–2	2–2	4–3	—	0–1	1–3	1–1	0–0	0–0	1–0	2–1	0–0	0–1	1–1	0–0
Leek Town	3–1	1–0	4–1	1–0	1–2	1–2	2–2	2–2	1–1	1–3	2–1	—	1–2	3–3	1–3	0–1	1–0	0–2	0–1	1–2	1–0	0–4
Macclesfield	1–0	2–1	1–0	6–0	2–0	2–0	3–1	4–1	1–1	4–0	5–1	1–2	—	1–0	6–1	2–0	1–0	4–1	1–0	4–0	3–2	3–1
Matlock Town	2–2	3–2	3–2	2–0	2–2	0–2	0–0	0–0	1–4	4–0	1–1	1–2	2–3	—	2–0	1–2	2–1	2–3	1–1	0–2	2–1	1–2
Mickleover	1–3	0–1	1–0	4–0	1–1	1–2	0–1	0–2	1–2	1–3	0–0	1–0	2–1	2–0	—	0–1	2–0	1–0	1–2	4–3	1–3	0–4
Morpeth Town	1–4	2–2	2–2	0–0	0–1	1–0	2–0	0–0	2–2	1–2	0–2	1–1	0–4	3–3	3–0	—	3–1	2–1	0–3	1–1	1–0	0–2
Prescot Cables	1–0	1–0	1–0	1–0	3–0	2–0	2–0	1–0	1–1	3–1	1–1	2–0	2–2	0–0	2–2	0–2	—	0–1	0–2	1–0	0–2	2–2
Stockton Town	1–2	2–2	1–1	0–3	1–0	2–3	3–1	1–1	1–0	1–0	1–0	1–0	0–1	1–0	3–0	1–1	3–2	—	1–3	2–0	5–0	3–0
Warrington Rylands 1906	3–4	1–2	3–0	2–1	1–1	1–1	1–1	2–2	2–0	0–1	0–2	2–0	1–3	2–1	2–2	1–1	0–1	1–3	—	0–1	2–1	0–3
Whitby Town	1–2	1–2	1–0	1–0	0–0	0–2	1–2	1–1	1–2	0–0	3–0	0–0	2–3	0–0	4–1	0–2	2–1	0–2	1–0	—	1–3	1–3
Workington	5–1	1–2	2–0	4–1	0–1	1–1	0–2	2–1	1–0	2–1	1–1	1–1	0–1	4–2	3–0	2–2	2–0	1–3	1–1	3–1	—	2–1
Worksop Town	2–0	0–1	4–0	5–2	1–1	4–1	1–4	2–4	3–1	2–0	4–1	2–0	0–1	8–0	6–0	0–2	1–2	2–1	3–3	2–0	4–2	—

Source: NPL official site
Legend: Blue = home team win; Yellow = draw; Red = away team win.

=== Top goalscorers ===
Rank	Player	Club	Goals
1	(England) Danny Elliott	Macclesfield	35
2	(Wales) Declan Howe	Gainsborough Trinity	23
3	(England) Montel Gibson	Matlock Town	22
4	(England) Tom Cursons	Ilkeston Town	21
4	(England) Darius Osei	Ashton United	21
6	(England) Will Longbottom	Guiseley	20
7	(England) Liam Hughes	Worksop Town	19
7	(England) Jack Redshaw	Hyde United	19
9	(England) D'Mani Bughail-Mellor	Macclesfield	18
10	(England) Amar Purewal	Hebburn Town	17
10	(England) Steven Rigg	Workington	17

=== Stadia and locations ===
2024–25 Premier Division teams
Locations of Northern Premier League 2024–25 Premier Division teams (Greater Manchester)

Club	Location	Ground	Capacity
Ashton United	Ashton-under-Lyne	Hurst Cross	4,500
Bamber Bridge	Bamber Bridge	Irongate	2,264
Basford United	Nottingham (Basford)	Greenwich Avenue	1,600
Blyth Spartans	Blyth	Croft Park	4,435
FC United of Manchester	Manchester (Moston)	Broadhurst Park	4,400
Gainsborough Trinity	Gainsborough	The Northolme	4,304
Guiseley	Guiseley	Nethermoor Park	4,200
Hebburn Town	Hebburn	The Green Energy Sports Ground	1,500
Hyde United	Hyde	Ewen Fields	4,250
Ilkeston Town	Ilkeston	New Manor Ground	3,029
Lancaster City	Lancaster	The Giant Axe	3,500
Leek Town	Leek	Harrison Park	3,600
Macclesfield	Macclesfield	Leasing.com Stadium	5,300
Matlock Town	Matlock	Causeway Lane	2,214
Mickleover	Mickleover	Station Road	1,500
Morpeth Town	Morpeth	Craik Park	1,500
Prescot Cables	Prescot	IP Truck Parts Stadium	3,200
Stockton Town	Stockton	Bishopton Road West	1,800
Warrington Rylands 1906	Warrington	Gorsey Lane	1,345
Whitby Town	Whitby	Turnbull Ground	3,500
Workington	Workington	Borough Park	3,101
Worksop Town	Worksop	Sandy Lane	2,500

== Division One East ==
Northern Premier League Division One East
- Season: 2024–25
- Champions: Cleethorpes United
- Promoted: Cleethorpes Town; Stocksbridge Park Steels
- Relegated: Sherwood Colliery; Liversedge; Sheffield

Division One East comprises 22 teams, two more than the previous season.

=== Team changes ===
To Division One East

Promoted from the Northern Counties East League Premier Division

- Emley
- Garforth Town

Promoted from the Northern Football League Division One

- Bishop Auckland
- Heaton Stannington

Promoted from the United Counties League Premier Division North

- Sherwood Colliery

Relegated from the Premier Division

- Bradford (Park Avenue)

From Division One East

Promoted to the Premier Division

- Hebburn Town
- Stockton Town

Transferred to Division One Midlands

- Grantham Town

Relegated to the Northern Counties East League Premier Division

- Winterton Rangers

=== Division One East table ===
Pos	Team	Pld	W	D	L	GF	GA	GD	Pts	Promotion, qualification or relegation
1	Cleethorpes Town (C, P)	42	28	9	5	91	35	+56	93	Promotion to the Premier Division
2	Dunston	42	24	9	9	82	47	+35	81	Qualification for the play-offs
3	Stocksbridge Park Steels (O, P)	42	23	9	10	64	37	+27	78	Qualification for the play-offs
4	Belper Town	42	23	9	10	73	51	+22	78	Qualification for the play-offs, then transferred to Division One Midlands
5	Emley	42	23	8	11	58	35	+23	77	Qualification for the play-offs
6	Newton Aycliffe	42	21	12	9	93	60	+33	75	
7	Carlton Town	42	20	11	11	69	55	+14	71	Transfer to Division One Midlands
8	North Ferriby	42	20	8	14	55	46	+9	68	
9	Garforth Town	42	16	11	15	53	49	+4	59	
10	Bradford (Park Avenue)	42	16	9	17	62	58	+4	57	
11	Bishop Auckland	42	13	13	16	60	65	−5	52	
12	Heaton Stannington	42	14	9	19	54	67	−13	51	
13	Pontefract Collieries	42	13	12	17	55	70	−15	51	
14	Consett	42	12	13	17	59	78	−19	49	
15	Ossett United	42	13	9	20	47	61	−14	48	
16	Ashington	42	13	9	20	50	67	−17	48	
17	Grimsby Borough	42	13	11	18	46	49	−3	47 (Note: Grimsby Borough were deducted three points.)	
18	Bridlington Town	42	14	4	24	50	75	−25	46	
19	Brighouse Town	42	11	14	17	47	73	−26	44 (Note: Brighouse Town were deducted three points.)	Reprieve from relegation (Note: Brighouse Town were reprieved from relegation due to the demotion of Farsley Celtic to the Northern Counties East League.)
20	Sherwood Colliery (R)	42	10	6	26	43	84	−41	36	Relegation to the United Counties League
21	Liversedge (R)	42	7	13	22	49	69	−20	34	Relegation to the Northern Counties East League
22	Sheffield (R)	42	7	8	27	51	80	−29	29	Relegation to the Northern Counties East League

Source: NPL official site
Rules for classification: 1) points; 2) goal difference; 3) number of goals scored; 4) number of matches won; 5) head-to-head results
(C) Champions; (O) Play-off winners; (P) Promoted; (R) Relegated

=== Play-offs ===
Semi-finals
2	Dunston	1
5	Emley	0
3	Stocksbridge Park Steels	2
4	Belper Town	1

Final
2	Dunston	0 (3)
3	Stocksbridge Park Steels	0 (5)

==== Semi-finals ====
29 April	Stocksbridge Park Steels	2–1 (a.e.t.)	Belper Town	Stocksbridge
19:45	Rawson 40'; Poole 110'	Report	Bastos 88'	Stadium: Bracken Moor; Attendance: 953

29 April	Dunston	1–0	Emley	Gateshead
19:45	Turner 90+4'	Report		Stadium: Wellington Road; Attendance: 903

==== Final ====
3 May	Dunston	0–0 (a.e.t.) (3–5 p)	Stocksbridge Park Steels	Gateshead
15:00				Stadium: Wellington Road; Attendance: 1,348
	Penalties
	Penalty missed Penalty scored		Penalty scored

=== Results table ===
Home \ Away	ASH	BEL	BIS	BRA	BRD	BRI	CAR	CLE	CON	DUN	EML	GAR	GRI	HEA	LIV	NEW	NOR	OSS	PON	SHE	SHR	STB
Ashington	—	2–2	1–2	1–0	3–2	4–1	2–2	0–2	1–1	0–1	3–1	0–1	2–2	0–1	0–4	0–4	2–3	2–1	2–3	1–4	0–1	0–2
Belper Town	1–0	—	0–0	1–0	3–0	0–2	1–3	0–2	6–4	2–5	2–0	2–0	1–1	3–0	2–0	0–2	0–1	0–3	3–0	3–1	5–2	3–0
Bishop Auckland	1–2	0–0	—	1–1	3–4	3–0	1–2	1–2	3–1	2–2	0–4	1–0	0–2	4–0	2–0	2–2	2–4	3–0	1–1	2–0	2–3	2–3
Bradford (Park Avenue)	0–1	2–3	1–1	—	3–1	1–1	1–1	2–2	1–3	1–1	0–0	1–3	3–2	2–0	1–4	0–1	1–0	2–1	4–0	2–1	4–1	3–0
Bridlington Town	3–1	0–2	4–2	0–1	—	1–1	0–1	0–3	1–2	1–0	0–2	2–3	0–1	1–0	0–0	0–2	0–3	2–5	0–2	1–0	2–0	0–3
Brighouse Town	1–0	1–1	2–1	2–2	1–1	—	4–1	0–3	0–2	1–0	0–1	2–2	0–3	3–3	0–3	2–2	0–1	0–0	1–1	1–0	1–4	0–2
Carlton Town	0–0	1–2	5–1	2–1	3–2	1–1	—	0–3	3–0	0–2	1–0	3–1	1–1	2–1	2–2	2–2	1–0	3–1	3–0	1–1	4–1	2–3
Cleethorpes Town	3–1	2–1	0–1	1–0	3–2	5–1	3–0	—	3–1	1–4	2–0	4–1	0–0	1–1	1–1	3–2	2–1	0–0	2–2	2–0	6–0	1–1
Consett	3–2	1–1	0–0	1–3	4–0	1–2	1–1	0–4	—	1–0	0–4	0–0	0–2	1–1	0–0	4–4	1–2	1–2	4–3	2–2	2–1	1–0
Dunston	2–0	2–3	3–4	2–1	3–2	4–1	2–1	3–2	6–1	—	3–0	1–1	0–0	3–2	2–2	2–1	1–2	2–0	1–0	3–1	3–1	0–1
Emley	1–0	3–1	1–1	3–1	0–2	2–1	4–0	0–3	2–1	2–2	—	0–2	2–1	0–0	1–1	3–0	1–2	1–0	2–1	2–1	1–0	3–0
Garforth Town	1–2	1–1	1–1	0–1	0–1	3–0	3–1	0–2	2–1	0–2	0–0	—	0–0	0–0	3–0	0–2	1–1	2–1	0–1	4–0	1–0	0–0
Grimsby Borough	0–1	0–2	2–1	1–3	0–2	1–1	0–1	1–0	0–1	1–1	0–1	1–3	—	0–3	1–1	1–2	0–0	5–0	1–2	3–1	3–0	2–1
Heaton Stannington	1–3	1–2	2–0	4–1	1–4	2–0	0–3	1–2	3–3	1–0	0–1	0–2	1–2	—	2–1	4–2	2–1	3–0	0–2	0–0	2–0	1–1
Liversedge	0–1	1–2	0–2	1–2	2–2	1–2	2–3	0–2	2–3	1–1	0–2	2–1	0–0	1–3	—	4–0	1–0	0–1	2–2	1–2	1–3	2–2
Newton Aycliffe	2–3	3–3	4–1	3–1	5–0	3–0	3–2	1–3	4–1	0–1	1–1	2–0	2–1	4–0	3–1	—	0–0	4–1	3–1	2–2	3–3	1–2
North Ferriby	2–0	0–2	1–2	1–0	1–0	0–1	1–1	0–0	3–3	2–1	1–0	2–0	3–1	1–1	2–1	2–3	—	0–2	1–1	3–2	3–2	0–1
Ossett United	1–1	1–2	1–1	3–1	1–0	4–2	0–0	4–1	0–1	1–1	0–4	0–3	3–0	1–3	0–0	0–0	1–3	—	0–3	0–0	0–1	0–1
Pontefract Collieries	2–2	0–0	1–1	2–1	2–3	2–2	0–2	0–3	1–1	2–3	0–0	2–2	1–3	3–0	3–1	1–3	1–0	1–2	—	2–1	2–1	0–4
Sheffield	2–2	1–4	2–0	1–3	1–2	1–2	1–2	1–3	2–1	0–2	0–1	3–4	0–1	5–1	1–2	2–2	0–2	1–2	2–1	—	2–0	1–2
Sherwood Colliery	1–1	0–1	1–1	1–1	0–2	1–4	1–0	0–3	1–0	1–2	0–2	1–2	1–0	0–2	4–1	0–3	1–0	0–4	0–1	3–3	—	1–1
Stocksbridge Park Steels	0–1	3–0	0–1	0–3	2–0	0–0	0–2	1–1	0–0	1–3	2–0	3–0	2–0	2–1	3–0	1–1	4–0	1–0	3–0	3–0	3–1	—

Source: NPL official site
Legend: Blue = home team win; Yellow = draw; Red = away team win.

=== Top goalscorers ===
Rank	Player	Club	Goals
1	(England) Jake Petitjean	Newton Aycliffe	22
2	(England) Josh Walker	Cleethorpes Town	21
3	(England) Harry Draper	Belper Town	18
3	(England) Luke Rawson	Belper Town; Stockbridge Park Steels	18
5	(England) Isaac Walker	Consett	17
6	(England) Curtis Bateson	Cleethorpes Town	16
6	(England) Josh Gilchrist	Ashington	16
6	(England) Brandon Holdsworth	Bishop Auckland; Consett	16
6	(England) JJ O'Donnell	Dunston	16

=== Stadia and locations ===
Locations of Northern Premier League 2024–25 Division One East teams
Locations of Northern Premier League 2025–26 Premier Division teams (West Yorkshire)

Team	Location	Stadium	Capacity
Ashington	Ashington	Woodhorn Lane	2,000
Belper Town	Belper	Christchurch Meadow	2,650
Bishop Auckland	Bishop Auckland	Heritage Park	1,950
Bradford (Park Avenue)	Bradford	Horsfall Stadium	3,500
Bridlington Town	Bridlington	Queensgate	3,000
Brighouse Town	Brighouse	St Giles Road	1,000
Carlton Town	Carlton	Bill Stokeld Stadium	1,500
Cleethorpes Town	Grimsby	Clee Road	1,000
Consett	Consett	Belle View Stadium	3,770
Dunston	Dunston	Wellington Road	2,500
Emley	Emley	Fantastic Media Welfare Ground	2,000
Garforth Town	Garforth	Wheatley Park	3,000
Grimsby Borough	Grimsby	Bradley Football Centre	1,000
Heaton Stannington	High Heaton	Grounsell Park	2,000
Liversedge	Cleckheaton	Clayborn	2,000
Newton Aycliffe	Newton Aycliffe	Moore Lane Park	1,000
North Ferriby	North Ferriby	The Dransfield Stadium	3,000
Ossett United	Ossett	Ingfield	1,950
Pontefract Collieries	Pontefract	Harratt Nissan Stadium	1,200
Sheffield	Dronfield	Coach and Horses Ground	2,089
Sherwood Colliery	Mansfield Woodhouse	Debdale Park	1,000
Stocksbridge Park Steels	Stocksbridge	Bracken Moor	3,500

== Division One Midlands ==
Northern Premier League Division One Midlands
- Season: 2024–25
- Champions: Quorn
- Promoted: Quorn; Worcester City
- Relegated: Rugby Town; Lye Town; Grantham Town

=== Team changes ===
To Division One Midlands

Promoted from the Hellenic League Premier Division

- Worcester City

Promoted from the Midland League Premier Division

- Darlaston Town (1874)

Promoted from the United Counties League Premier Division North

- Loughborough Students

Promoted from the United Counties League Premier Division South

- Racing Club Warwick
- Wellingborough Town

Relegated from the Southern League Premier Division Central

- Long Eaton United

Transferred from Division One East

- Grantham Town

From Division One Midlands

Promoted to the Southern League Premier Division Central

- Harborough Town
- Spalding United

Transferred to the Isthmian League North Division

- Cambridge City

Relegated to the United Counties League Premier Division North

- Gresley Rovers

Resigned to the Leicestershire Senior League Division One

- Loughborough Dynamo

=== Division One Midlands table ===
Pos	Team	Pld	W	D	L	GF	GA	GD	Pts	Promotion, qualification or relegation
1	Quorn (C, P)	40	32	7	1	104	25	+79	103	Promotion to the Southern League Premier Central
2	Corby Town	40	27	4	9	84	40	+44	85	Qualification for the play-offs
3	Anstey Nomads	40	24	8	8	83	45	+38	80	Qualification for the play-offs
4	Worcester City (O, P)	40	23	4	13	83	52	+31	73	Qualification for the play-offs
5	Long Eaton United	40	22	6	12	92	54	+38	72	Qualification for the play-offs
6	Sporting Khalsa	40	20	7	13	74	60	+14	67	Transfer to Division One West
7	Darlaston Town (1874)	40	17	10	13	57	49	+8	61	Transfer to Division One West
8	Wellingborough Town	40	16	10	14	57	52	+5	58	
9	Coleshill Town	40	16	8	16	61	56	+5	56	
10	Hinckley LRFC (R)	40	15	10	15	54	50	+4	55	Resigned
11	Racing Club Warwick	40	15	7	18	61	65	−4	52	
12	Sutton Coldfield Town	40	15	5	20	51	60	−9	50	
13	Shepshed Dynamo	40	13	11	16	47	58	−11	50	
14	AFC Rushden & Diamonds	40	13	10	17	44	61	−17	49	
15	Loughborough Students	40	13	9	18	53	69	−16	48	
16	Boldmere St Michaels	40	13	8	19	45	69	−24	47	
17	Coventry Sphinx	40	11	13	16	50	65	−15	46	
18	Bedworth United	40	9	12	19	54	72	−18	39	
19	Rugby Town	40	8	11	21	36	76	−40	35	Reprived from relegation (Note: Rugby Town were reprived from relegation due to the resignation of Hinckley LRFC.)
20	Lye Town (R)	40	6	9	25	33	84	−51	27	Relegation to the Midland League
21	Grantham Town (R)	40	2	11	27	30	91	−61	17	Relegation to the United Counties League Premier North
22	Walsall Wood	0	0	0	0	0	0	0	0	Resigned from the league (Note: On 29 October, Walsall Wood resigned from the NPL. Walsall Wood's playing record of Pld11 W5 D4 L2 GD4 Pts19 was expunged.)

Source: NPL official site
Rules for classification: 1) points; 2) goal difference; 3) number of goals scored; 4) number of matches won; 5) head-to-head results
(C) Champions; (O) Play-off winners; (P) Promoted; (R) Relegated

=== Play-offs ===
Semi-finals
2	Corby Town	1
5	Long Eaton United	0
3	Anstey Nomads	0
4	Worcester City	2

Final
2	Corby Town	1
4	Worcester City	2

==== Semi-finals ====
29 April	Anstey Nomads	0–2	Worcester City	Anstey
19:45		Report	Hartley 1'; Guinan 38'	Stadium: Cropston Road; Attendance: 642; Referee: Aaron Hallam

29 April	Corby Town	1–0	Long Eaton United	Corby
19:45	Keeble 62'	Report		Stadium: Steel Park; Attendance: 1,496; Referee: Alex Rolfe

==== Final ====
3 May	Corby Town	1–2	Worcester City	Corby
15:00	Marshall 87'		Reeves 77'; Miles 83'	Stadium: Steel Park; Attendance: 2,766; Referee: David Hinton

=== Results table ===
Home \ Away	RUD	ANS	BED	BSM	COL	COR	CVS	DAR	GRA	HLR	LOE	LOU	LYE	QUO	RAC	RUG	SHE	SPO	SUT	WEL	WOR
AFC Rushden & Diamonds	—	1–5	1–1	3–1	3–1	0–2	1–2	0–1	5–1	2–2	1–0	5–3	1–0	0–3	0–0	1–0	0–3	0–3	1–1	1–1	3–1
Anstey Nomads	0–0	—	2–2	5–0	2–1	0–2	0–0	2–0	4–0	4–0	0–5	3–1	2–0	2–3	2–1	2–0	1–1	3–2	1–0	3–1	2–1
Bedworth United	2–1	2–4	—	1–1	0–4	1–3	0–2	3–1	0–0	0–0	1–3	0–2	2–0	1–3	1–2	2–2	2–0	3–5	1–3	2–2	3–0
Boldmere St Michaels	0–1	2–2	2–1	—	1–2	0–4	1–2	1–1	1–0	0–2	1–2	1–1	4–3	0–1	2–1	4–0	2–1	1–0	1–4	3–2	0–2
Coleshill Town	3–0	1–2	1–4	2–1	—	4–0	2–2	2–2	2–1	0–1	3–2	2–1	6–0	0–3	0–2	1–0	2–0	0–2	0–0	1–2	3–3
Corby Town	4–0	1–0	1–0	3–1	0–0	—	4–0	1–2	4–0	0–3	7–0	1–1	2–1	0–2	2–0	3–0	3–2	0–4	4–1	3–1	2–0
Coventry Sphinx	1–2	1–1	1–0	1–1	1–2	1–1	—	0–0	2–1	0–1	1–5	2–2	2–3	0–5	3–1	0–2	3–0	2–0	0–2	2–2	0–2
Darlaston Town (1874)	1–2	2–4	1–0	1–2	2–2	1–4	0–2	—	1–0	4–0	1–0	3–0	1–1	0–3	0–2	2–1	0–0	1–1	3–1	1–1	2–0
Grantham Town	0–0	1–1	1–6	0–0	0–0	0–1	2–1	1–2	—	0–1	1–5	1–2	0–0	2–2	1–4	1–1	2–2	0–1	0–3	1–3	3–2
Hinckley LRFC	0–0	0–1	1–1	2–0	0–0	0–2	0–2	2–1	4–2	—	1–3	3–0	2–1	0–1	2–1	5–1	1–2	1–1	2–1	0–1	0–1
Long Eaton United	2–1	5–2	2–2	5–0	1–2	3–2	1–0	2–0	4–0	1–1	—	1–2	3–0	1–1	1–3	1–1	3–0	2–2	2–0	4–2	1–2
Loughborough Students	1–1	0–3	1–2	0–2	2–1	3–1	2–2	0–3	2–0	0–2	0–4	—	2–1	0–1	3–0	5–1	2–1	0–0	1–1	2–0	1–3
Lye Town	2–1	1–5	2–2	0–2	3–2	0–3	0–0	0–3	2–1	4–4	1–1	0–4	—	0–2	0–0	1–3	1–2	0–2	1–4	1–0	0–3
Quorn	2–1	0–0	6–0	4–1	3–0	3–0	4–3	1–1	5–0	1–0	2–3	5–1	1–0	—	2–0	1–1	4–1	1–0	5–1	3–0	3–3
Racing Club Warwick	5–1	0–3	4–2	0–1	1–0	1–2	2–3	2–4	3–1	2–2	4–2	0–0	1–2	0–2	—	1–0	1–2	4–3	1–0	2–0	2–2
Rugby Town	0–1	0–3	1–0	1–1	1–3	1–2	1–1	1–0	1–1	2–1	2–5	1–1	0–0	0–6	1–0	—	2–2	1–2	3–0	0–3	1–6
Shepshed Dynamo	0–0	0–3	1–2	1–1	1–0	0–1	3–0	1–3	1–1	2–1	0–3	3–2	1–0	1–1	1–1	0–1	—	1–2	1–0	1–1	1–0
Sporting Khalsa	1–2	1–2	3–0	3–1	4–1	0–5	2–2	2–1	2–1	1–1	3–2	1–2	5–1	0–1	3–3	2–0	1–3	—	2–0	0–2	3–2
Sutton Coldfield Town	2–1	1–0	0–0	1–2	1–2	0–1	3–1	0–1	4–2	2–1	0–2	2–1	3–1	0–2	1–3	2–2	1–4	1–2	—	1–0	1–0
Wellingborough Town	1–0	2–1	2–1	3–0	0–2	0–0	2–2	2–2	2–1	0–3	1–0	4–0	0–0	1–2	5–0	1–0	1–1	1–2	2–1	—	0–1
Worcester City	3–0	4–1	1–1	1–0	2–1	4–3	2–0	0–2	5–0	3–2	1–0	2–0	2–0	1–4	3–1	3–0	3–0	6–1	1–2	2–3	—

Source: NPL official site
Legend: Blue = home team win; Yellow = draw; Red = away team win.

=== Top goalscorers ===
Rank	Player	Club	Goals
1	(England) Fletcher Toll	Corby Town	29
2	(England) Jacob Fenton	Anstey Nomads	22
3	(England) Simeon Cobourne	Sporting Khalsa	20
3	(England) Evan Garnett	Long Eaton United	20
3	(England) James Shaw	Long Eaton United	20
6	(England) Andre Landell	Sporting Khalsa	16
7	(England) James Taylor	Long Eaton United	15
8	(England) Ryan Beswick	Quorn	14
8	(England) Trey Charles	Rugby Town	14

=== Stadia and locations ===
Locations of Northern Premier League 2024–25 Division One Midlands teams

Team	Location	Stadium	Capacity
AFC Rushden & Diamonds	Rushden	Hayden Road	2,000
Anstey Nomads	Anstey	Cropston Road	1,000
Bedworth United	Bedworth	The Oval	3,000
Boldmere St Michaels	Boldmere	Trevor Brown Memorial Ground	2,000
Coleshill Town	Coleshill	Pack Meadow	2,000
Corby Town	Corby	Steel Park	3,893
Coventry Sphinx	Coventry	Sphinx Drive	1,000
Darlaston Town (1874)	Walsall	The Paycare Ground	1,000
Grantham Town	Grantham	South Kesteven Sports Stadium	7,500
Hinckley LRFC	Hinckley	Leicester Road Stadium	4,329
Long Eaton United	Long Eaton	Grange Park	3,000
Loughborough Students	Loughborough	Loughborough University Stadium	3,000
Lye Town	Lye	Lye Sports Ground	1,000
Quorn	Quorn	Farley Way Stadium	1,400
Racing Club Warwick	Warwick	Townsend Meadow	1,280
Rugby Town	Rugby	Butlin Road	6,000
Shepshed Dynamo	Shepshed	The Dovecote Stadium	2,500
Sporting Khalsa	Willenhall	Aspray Arena	5,000
Sutton Coldfield Town	Sutton Coldfield	Coles Lane	4,500
Walsall Wood	Walsall Wood	Oak Park	1,000
Wellingborough Town	Wellingborough	Dog & Duck Football Ground	2,500
Worcester City	Worcester	Claines Lane	1,000

== Division One West ==
Northern Premier League Division One West
- Season: 2024–25
- Champions: Widnes
- Promoted: Widnes; Hednesford Town
- Relegated: Wythenshawe; Hanley Town; City of Liverpool

=== Team changes ===
To Division One West

Promoted from the Midland League Premier Division

- Congleton Town

Promoted from the North West Counties League Premier Division

- Wythenshawe
- Wythenshawe Town

Relegated from the Premier Division

- Atherton Collieries
- Stafford Rangers

From Division One West

Promoted to the Premier Division

- Leek Town
- Prescot Cables

Relegated to the Midland League Premier Division

- 1874 Northwich

=== Division One West table ===
Pos	Team	Pld	W	D	L	GF	GA	GD	Pts	Promotion, qualification or relegation
1	Widnes (C, P)	42	25	10	7	79	38	+41	85	Promotion to the Premier Division
2	Hednesford Town (O, P)	42	24	10	8	81	40	+41	82	Qualification for the play-offs
3	Congleton Town	42	24	6	12	82	56	+26	78	Qualification for the play-offs
4	Chasetown	42	22	8	12	84	53	+31	74	Qualification for the play-offs
5	Vauxhall Motors	42	22	8	12	73	55	+18	74	Qualification for the play-offs
6	Stalybridge Celtic	42	21	7	14	72	66	+6	70	
7	Avro	42	17	13	12	53	46	+7	64	
8	Nantwich Town	42	18	9	15	74	56	+18	63	
9	Trafford	42	17	11	14	54	56	−2	62	
10	Clitheroe	42	17	10	15	79	72	+7	61	
11	Runcorn Linnets	42	17	10	15	54	70	−16	61	
12	Stafford Rangers	42	16	10	16	66	60	+6	58	
13	Mossley	42	15	12	15	49	46	+3	57	
14	Bootle	42	16	8	18	67	67	0	56	
15	Atherton Collieries	42	16	8	18	56	62	−6	56	
16	Newcastle Town	42	14	12	16	49	50	−1	54	
17	Witton Albion	42	16	6	20	54	63	−9	54	
18	Kidsgrove Athletic	42	13	11	18	53	63	−10	50	
19	Wythenshawe Town	42	11	13	18	56	59	−3	46	Reprieve from relegation (Note: Wythenshawe Town were reprieved from relegation due to the resignation of Bemerton Heath Harlequins from the Southern League Division One South.)
20	Wythenshawe (R)	42	10	8	24	45	75	−30	38	Relegation to the North West Counties League
21	Hanley Town (R)	42	5	10	27	37	83	−46	25	Relegation to the Midland League
22	City of Liverpool (R)	42	3	6	33	37	118	−81	15	Relegation to the North West Counties League

Source: NPL official site
Rules for classification: 1) points; 2) goal difference; 3) number of goals scored; 4) number of matches won; 5) head-to-head results
(C) Champions; (O) Play-off winners; (P) Promoted; (R) Relegated

=== Play-offs ===
Semi-finals
2	Hednesford Town	3
5	Vauxhall Motors	1
3	Congleton Town	2 (4)
4	Chasetown	2 (3)

Final
2	Hednesford Town	2
3	Congleton Town	0

==== Semi-finals ====
29 April	Congleton Town	2–2 (a.e.t.) (4–3 p)	Chasetown	Congleton
19:45	Needham 90'; McCarthy 103'	Report	Langston 86'; Yates 111'	Stadium: Cleric Stadium; Attendance: 1,501; Referee: Nathaniel Cox
	Penalties
	Penalty scored		(penalty scored) Yates; (penalty scored) Pond

29 April	Hednesford Town	3–1	Vauxhall Motors	Hednesford
19:45	Rose 10'; McHale 37'; Trickett-Smith 88'	Report	Rooney 45+5'	Stadium: Keys Park; Attendance: 2,200; Referee: Kieran Chell

==== Final ====
3 May	Hednesford Town	2–0	Congleton Town	Hednesford
15:00	Jervis 45+7' (pen.); Bearne 90+4'		Williams (yellow card) 45+5' (yellow-red card) 81'	Stadium: Keys Park; Attendance: 4,701; Referee: Charles King

=== Results table ===
Home \ Away	ATH	AVR	BOO	CHA	COL	CLI	CON	HAN	HED	KID	MOS	NAN	NEW	RUN	STA	STB	TRA	VAU	WID	WIT	WYS	WYT
Atherton Collieries	—	2–0	1–1	1–2	3–0	2–2	3–4	4–2	1–3	0–1	1–0	1–0	0–0	1–2	1–1	0–5	4–0	3–2	0–0	0–3	1–2	2–1
Avro	1–0	—	1–0	1–1	1–3	3–1	3–2	1–1	1–1	2–0	2–2	2–1	2–1	3–1	1–1	2–2	0–0	3–0	0–4	4–0	0–2	0–1
Bootle	2–0	2–1	—	2–2	3–0	2–0	0–2	0–1	0–1	3–3	0–2	2–0	0–0	0–1	1–2	5–2	2–2	3–6	2–4	1–1	2–0	1–0
Chasetown	2–1	3–0	3–0	—	3–0	2–1	3–3	6–0	0–3	4–0	1–1	4–0	3–1	2–3	2–1	3–4	1–2	2–1	2–1	2–1	3–0	2–0
City of Liverpool	3–4	2–2	1–2	1–1	—	1–1	0–5	0–0	0–4	1–3	0–2	2–8	0–1	0–1	0–8	1–2	2–2	1–3	0–2	1–2	1–4	0–3
Clitheroe	2–1	1–3	5–3	4–1	2–0	—	2–4	1–1	1–1	2–2	0–1	1–1	4–1	4–1	0–0	1–1	3–1	2–3	4–0	4–0	4–2	0–0
Congleton Town	1–2	2–1	4–3	1–0	5–1	4–2	—	1–0	1–0	2–1	2–1	1–1	0–0	6–0	5–0	3–1	0–3	0–0	1–2	0–2	1–0	1–0
Hanley Town	0–1	0–1	0–4	0–2	2–4	1–3	0–1	—	0–1	1–2	1–3	1–3	0–0	1–2	0–2	2–3	1–1	0–2	0–2	2–1	3–1	0–3
Hednesford Town	1–2	0–0	2–4	1–1	4–0	8–1	1–0	1–1	—	1–2	2–0	2–0	3–1	1–0	4–2	2–0	0–1	3–2	0–0	2–1	1–1	1–1
Kidsgrove Athletic	2–1	0–1	0–0	2–3	4–1	1–2	0–3	1–0	0–2	—	1–0	1–2	0–0	1–1	1–2	0–0	1–0	2–0	1–5	4–0	4–0	1–4
Mossley	2–0	0–1	2–0	0–0	2–0	3–0	2–2	0–3	1–0	1–1	—	1–0	1–2	2–0	0–0	2–2	2–3	0–1	1–1	1–0	0–1	1–1
Nantwich Town	2–0	1–1	3–1	0–2	2–0	1–2	3–2	6–0	0–2	2–2	1–2	—	2–1	1–1	2–1	4–0	6–0	1–1	2–2	4–1	1–2	1–1
Newcastle Town	1–0	1–0	1–1	1–1	2–0	2–1	1–2	2–2	1–2	2–0	1–1	1–2	—	0–1	2–1	2–1	0–2	0–1	1–1	1–2	1–2	3–0
Runcorn Linnets	2–1	1–0	1–3	2–3	2–0	0–3	1–0	2–1	2–6	2–0	3–1	0–1	1–2	—	1–3	3–2	0–2	1–1	2–2	0–4	3–1	2–2
Stafford Rangers	5–0	1–3	1–2	0–2	6–1	3–2	2–0	2–1	1–1	0–0	3–0	2–1	2–2	2–2	—	1–3	1–1	0–1	0–4	1–0	2–1	0–2
Stalybridge Celtic	1–3	1–0	2–1	2–1	2–0	1–0	0–2	1–1	4–3	1–0	2–1	4–2	2–1	2–3	1–0	—	1–2	1–1	0–1	3–0	2–3	2–1
Trafford	0–1	1–1	0–1	3–2	4–1	2–1	1–1	2–1	1–2	1–1	0–3	2–1	1–3	1–1	1–2	1–2	—	0–2	1–0	1–2	2–0	1–1
Vauxhall Motors	0–0	1–2	0–2	2–0	4–2	3–3	1–3	3–1	2–1	3–2	3–2	1–2	2–0	0–1	2–2	3–2	0–1	—	1–3	1–1	2–0	4–0
Widnes	0–2	1–1	2–1	3–2	2–0	3–0	5–1	3–0	2–3	3–0	2–0	0–0	2–1	1–1	2–0	3–0	1–0	1–2	—	0–1	2–1	2–2
Witton Albion	1–3	0–1	1–2	2–1	2–1	1–2	5–2	2–2	2–2	2–1	1–1	2–0	0–3	4–0	2–0	0–1	0–1	0–1	0–1	—	1–0	2–1
Wythenshawe	1–1	1–1	3–1	0–3	1–4	2–3	3–1	1–2	0–2	0–2	1–2	1–2	1–1	0–0	2–1	2–2	1–1	0–2	1–2	1–1	—	0–2
Wythenshawe Town	2–2	1–0	4–2	2–1	2–2	0–2	0–1	2–2	0–1	3–3	0–0	1–2	1–2	0–0	1–2	0–2	1–3	2–3	1–2	4–1	3–0	—

Source: NPL official site
Legend: Blue = home team win; Yellow = draw; Red = away team win.

=== Top goalscorers ===
Rank	Player	Club	Goals
1	(England) Rio Clegg	Trafford	20
2	(England) Max McCarthy	Congleton Town	19
3	(Wales) Nick Rushton	Vauxhall Motors	18
4	(Wales) Kai Evans	Nantwich Town	17
4	(France) Veron Parny	Clitheroe	17
6	(England) Aaron Dwyer	Atherton Collieries	16
7	(England) George Cater	Chasetown	15
7	(England) Jack Langston	Chasetown	15
9	(Scotland) George Boyd	Wythenshawe Town	14
9	(England) Leon Creech	Clitheroe	14
9	(England) Sean Miller	Widnes	14

=== Stadia and locations ===
Locations of Northern Premier League 2024–25 Division One West teams
Locations of Northern Premier League 2024–25 Division One West Staffordshire teams

Team	Location	Stadium	Capacity
Atherton Collieries	Atherton	Alder Street	2,500
Avro	Oldham	Whitebank Stadium	1,500
Bootle	Bootle	New Bucks Park	3,750
Chasetown	Burntwood	The Scholars Ground	3,000
City of Liverpool	Widnes	Halton Stadium (groundshare with Widnes)	13,350
Clitheroe	Clitheroe	Shawbridge	2,000
Congleton Town	Congleton	Cleric Stadium	1,450
Hanley Town	Stoke-on-Trent	Potteries Park	1,300
Hednesford Town	Hednesford	Keys Park	6,039
Kidsgrove Athletic	Kidsgrove	The Autonet Insurance Stadium	2,000
Mossley	Mossley	Seel Park	4,000
Nantwich Town	Nantwich	The Weaver Stadium	3,500
Newcastle Town	Newcastle-under-Lyme	Lyme Valley Stadium	4,000
Runcorn Linnets	Runcorn	APEC Taxis Stadium	1,600
Stafford Rangers	Stafford	Marston Road	4,000
Stalybridge Celtic	Stalybridge	Bower Fold	6,500
Trafford	Flixton	Shawe Lane	2,500
Vauxhall Motors	Ellesmere Port	vanEupen Arena	3,300
Widnes	Widnes	Halton Stadium	13,350
Witton Albion	Northwich	Wincham Park	4,813
Wythenshawe	Wythenshawe	Hollyhedge Park	1,500
Wythenshawe Town	Wythenshawe	Ericstan Stadium	1,000
