= 2012–13 Wolverhampton Wanderers F.C. season =

English football club season

Wolverhampton Wanderers
2012–13 season
- Chairman: Steve Morgan
- Manager: Ståle Solbakken (until 5 January); Dean Saunders (from 7 January)
- Championship: 23rd (relegated)
- FA Cup: Third round
- League Cup: Third round
- Top goalscorer: League: Sylvan Ebanks-Blake (14); All: Sylvan Ebanks-Blake (15)
- Highest home attendance: 28,595 (vs Ipswich, 29 December 2012)
- Lowest home attendance: 11,555 (vs Aldershot, 11 August 2012)
- Average home league attendance: 21,662
Home colours	Away colours

The 2012–13 season was the 114th season of competitive league football in the history of English football club Wolverhampton Wanderers. The club competed in the second tier of the English football system, the Football League Championship. They had returned to the second level having been relegated from the Premier League after three seasons during the previous season.

Norwegian manager Ståle Solbakken was appointed to begin the season as the club's manager, but he was sacked on 5 January with the team in 18th place and having been eliminated from the FA Cup by at that time non-league club Luton Town. He was swiftly replaced by former Doncaster Rovers manager Dean Saunders who oversaw the remaining twenty games.

After Saunders failed to bring any upturn, the club suffered relegation for a second successive season to drop into the third level for the first time since 1988–89. This made them the only club to twice experience back-to-back relegations from the top flight, having already suffered this previously in the mid 1980s. Three days after their relegation was confirmed, Saunders was fired having held the post for only four months.

== Season review ==
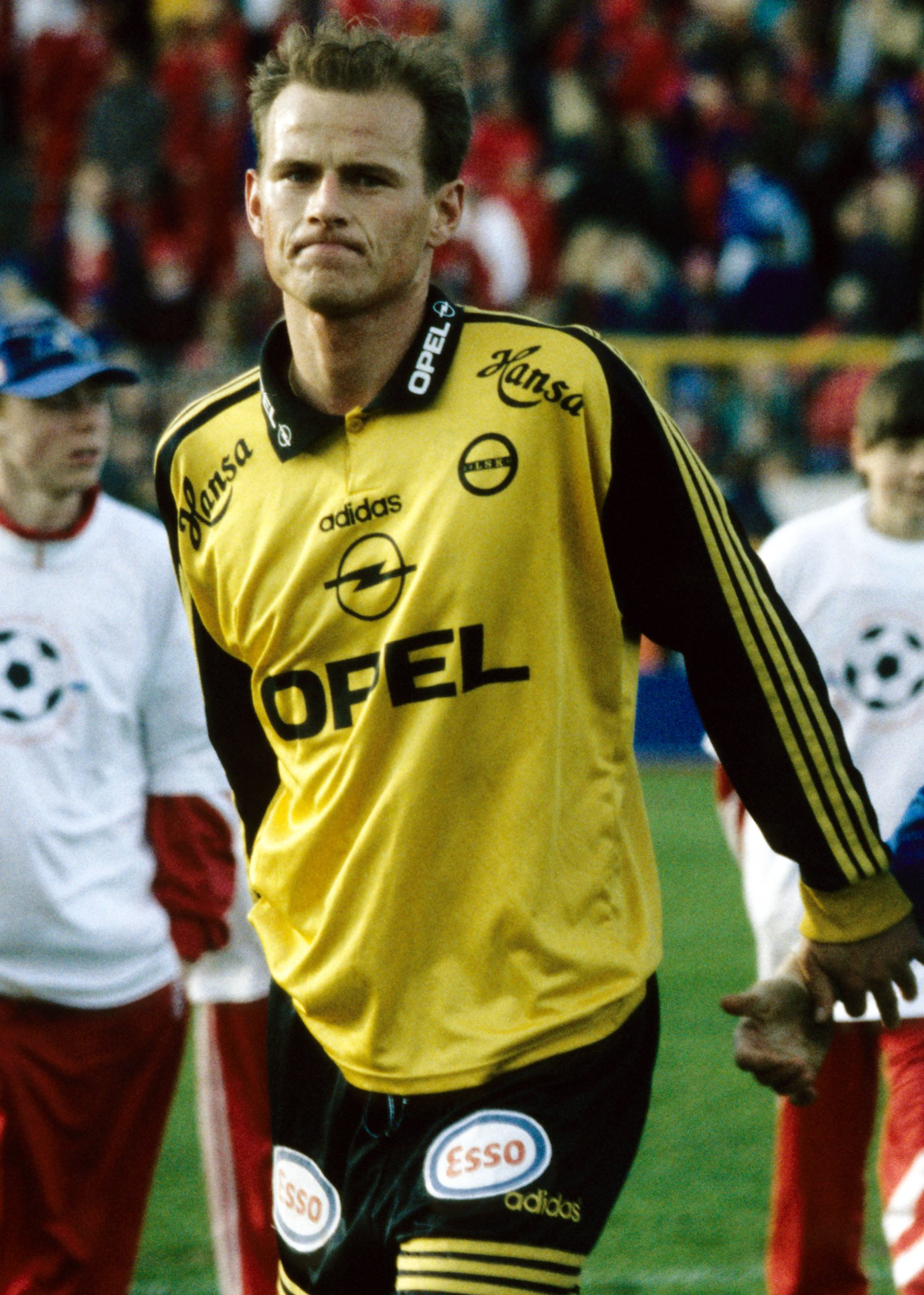
Former Norwegian international Ståle Solbakken began the season as Wolves' new manager.

Having been relegated from the Premier League after three seasons, the club sought to put a new playing style in place under new manager Ståle Solbakken who officially became the permanent replacement for Mick McCarthy on 1 July. In contrast to McCarthy's preference for British and Irish players, the Norwegian used the foreign market for all of his summer signings, with Bakary Sako, Razak Boukari, Björn Sigurðarson and Georg Margreitter signing permanent deals as well as the loan captures of Tongo Doumbia and Sławomir Peszko. Despite these incomings, the transfer window saw the sale of several key players with leading goalscorer Steven Fletcher exiting for a club record £14 million fee, and both Matt Jarvis and Michael Kightly also remaining in the Premier League with new clubs.

The players began pre-season training on 9 July, which featured a week at a training camp in Ireland. After four pre-season matches, their first competitive game of the campaign saw the team narrowly win a League Cup tie against Aldershot after a penalty shootout. League football began on 18 August with a 0–1 defeat at Leeds, before the team registered their first victory at Molineux in nine months by beating Barnsley.

After an inconsistent start September brought a run of four consecutive victories to lift the team up the table. Victory at fellow newly relegated club Blackburn in early October placed Wolves in third place, which was to be their highest position of the season. These results came at a price as their injury list grew with Razak Boukari, Stephen Hunt and Sławomir Peszko all sidelined with long-term problems. Winger Jermaine Pennant was therefore loaned to help but the team hit a poor run of form and failed to win any of their next ten fixtures.

December began with a halting of this poor sequence as three wins were recorded from four games, but their three games over the festive period were all lost, leading Solbakken to declare that they were "in a crisis". When the following game - a loss at Luton - brought their first exit from the FA Cup to a non-league side since 1986, he was fired as manager after six months in the role. He later expressed disappointment at owner Steve Morgan offering him such a limited period of time to oversee a reshaping of the club's playing culture and identity.

In contrast to the club's "drawn-out" recruitment process after the dismissal of Mick McCarthy, Solbakken's replacement was swiftly announced within two days as former Doncaster Rovers' manager Dean Saunders was unveiled on 7 January as Wolves' fourth different manager within twelve months. Steve Morgan defended the changes and stated that he hoped Saunders would be with the club "for a long period of time".

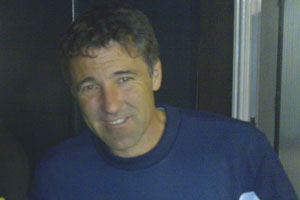
Dean Saunders became Wolves' second manager of the season.

At the time of Saunders' first game at the helm, the team sat in 18th position six points clear of the relegation zone and nine points from the play-off places. He said that, while he believed promotion still remained possible, "the more likely scenario is we’re going to creep up the league." He soon used the January transfer window to make two loan signings as defenders Kaspars Gorkšs and Jack Robinson were brought in from the top flight. The manager's first game brought a 1–1 draw against Blackburn, which was to be the first of nine winless games under his command.

Saunders' first win arrived at the start of March, by which time the team had slumped into the Championship relegation zone for the first time since October 1999. An upturn in form brought four wins from five games but the form of the other relegation-battling sides meant that Wolves were never any more than a single point above the relegation zone. Injuries to both of their leading goalscorers, Sylvan Ebanks-Blake and Bakary Sako, further endangered their risk of losing their Championship status.

Shorn of attacking options, their final six games brought five defeats which meant relegation for a second consecutive season. A home loss to Burnley in their penultimate match effectively consigned the club to their fate, and led to some supporters storming the pitch at full-time to show their anger at the situation. Only victory on the final day, coupled with defeats for both Barnsley and Peterborough and a five-goal swing in goal difference would have prevented relegation, but in the event, Wolves lost their game at Brighton to become the first club to twice be relegated from the top division to the third level within two years.

Although Saunders initially spoke of his hopes to be allowed to rebuild the team in League One, three days later it was announced that he had become the fourth Wolves manager in fifteen months to leave his post. The club announced it would be taking an indefinite time to seek a "head coach" rather than a manager as it sought to restructure in preparation for their first season outside the top two divisions since 1988–89.

== Results ==
=== Preseason ===
The final pre-season friendly was scheduled to be held on 11 August against Aston Villa, but was cancelled to allow Wolves to instead take up the option of playing their League Cup tie on this date.

21 July 2012	Bray Wanderers	1–5	Wolverhampton Wanderers	Bray, Ireland
15:00 BST	Waters 32'	Report	Nouble 14'; Fletcher 56', 87'; Jarvis 60'; Doherty 81'	Stadium: Carlisle Grounds; Referee: Derek Tomney

28 July 2012	Walsall	0–3	Wolverhampton Wanderers	Walsall
15:00 BST		Report	Nouble 23'; Hammill 37'; Doyle 68'	Stadium: Banks's Stadium; Attendance: 4,219 (2,247 away); Referee: Oliver Langford

31 July 2012	Shrewsbury Town	2–2	Wolverhampton Wanderers	Shrewsbury
19:00 BST	Gornell 19'; Berra 41' (o.g.)	Report	Ebanks-Blake 51'; Doumbia 75'	Stadium: Greenhous Meadow; Attendance: 4,105; Referee: Rob Lewis

4 August 2012	Southampton	2–0	Wolverhampton Wanderers	Southampton
15:00 BST	Sharp 22'; Puncheon 69'	Report		Stadium: St Mary's; Attendance: 3,978; Referee: Andy Davies

"Wolves Development XI" pre season results: 0–2 vs Leyton Orient (25 July), 0–1 vs Kidderminster Harriers (27 July), 4–2 vs Birmingham (1 August), 2–0 vs Telford United (3 August), 3–1 vs Wigan (8 August)

=== Football League Championship ===
A total of 24 teams competed in the Football League Championship in the 2012–13 season. Each team played every other team twice, once at their stadium, and once at the opposition's. Three points were awarded to teams for each win, one point per draw, and none for defeats.

The provisional fixture list was released on 18 June 2012, but was subject to change in the event of matches being selected for television coverage or police concerns.

18 August 2012 1	Leeds United	1–0	Wolverhampton Wanderers	Leeds
12:45 BST	Becchio 17'	Report		Stadium: Elland Road; Attendance: 23,745 (1,541 away fans); Referee: Anthony Bates

21 August 2012 2	Wolverhampton Wanderers	3–1	Barnsley	Wolverhampton
19:45 BST	Ward 8'; Ebanks-Blake 61'; Edwards 70'	Report	Cywka 79'	Stadium: Molineux; Attendance: 24,400 (475 away fans); Referee: Phil Gibbs

25 August 2012 3	Wolverhampton Wanderers	1–1	Derby County	Wolverhampton
15:00 BST	Doyle 35'	Report	Robinson 90+3'	Stadium: Molineux; Attendance: 21,861 (1,480 away fans); Referee: Jon Moss

2 September 2012 4	Cardiff City	3–1	Wolverhampton Wanderers	Cardiff
14:00 BST	Whittingham 11' (pen.), 14', 65'	Report	Sako 10'	Stadium: Cardiff City Stadium; Attendance: 22,020 (1,479 away fans); Referee: Andy D'Urso

16 September 2012 5	Wolverhampton Wanderers	2–1	Leicester City	Wolverhampton
13:15 BST	Ebanks-Blake 13'; Stearman 21'	Report	Konchesky 70'	Stadium: Molineux; Attendance: 20,030 (1,375 away fans); Referee: Stuart Attwell

19 September 2012 6	Ipswich Town	0–2	Wolverhampton Wanderers	Ipswich
19:45 BST		Report	Smith 69' (o.g.); Doumbia 77'	Stadium: Portman Road; Attendance: 16,540 (723 away fans); Referee: Graham Scott

22 September 2012 7	Peterborough United	0–2	Wolverhampton Wanderers	Peterborough
15:00 BST		Report	Ebanks-Blake 33' (pen.); Sigurðarson 82'	Stadium: London Road; Attendance: 9,280 (2,758 away fans); Referee: Andy Haines

29 September 2012 8	Wolverhampton Wanderers	1–0	Sheffield Wednesday	Wolverhampton
15:00 BST	Sako 43'	Report		Stadium: Molineux; Attendance: 23,591 (2,960 away fans); Referee: Simon Hooper

2 October 2012 9	Wolverhampton Wanderers	1–2	Crystal Palace	Wolverhampton
19:45 BST	Ebanks-Blake 53'	Report	Zaha 67', 73'	Stadium: Molineux; Attendance: 19,561 (321 away fans); Referee: Graham Salisbury

6 October 2012 10	Blackburn Rovers	0–1	Wolverhampton Wanderers	Blackburn
15:00 BST		Report	Sako 78'	Stadium: Ewood Park; Attendance: 17,034 (1,297 away fans); Referee: Nigel Miller

20 October 2012 11	Huddersfield Town	2–1	Wolverhampton Wanderers	Huddersfield
15:00 BST	Vaughan 10'; Beckford 27'	Report	Ebanks-Blake 63'	Stadium: John Smith's Stadium; Attendance: 18,012 (2,521 away fans); Referee: James Adcock

23 October 2012 12	Wolverhampton Wanderers	2–2	Bolton Wanderers	Wolverhampton
19:45 BST	Doyle 27', 30'	Report	Afobe 21'; Davies 90'	Stadium: Molineux; Attendance: 20,915 (826 away fans); Referee: Lee Probert

27 October 2012 13	Wolverhampton Wanderers	1–1	Charlton Athletic	Wolverhampton
15:00 BST	Sako 12'	Report	Wilson 58'	Stadium: Molineux; Attendance: 22,198 (1,055 away fans); Referee: Craig Pawson

3 November 2012 14	Burnley	2–0	Wolverhampton Wanderers	Burnley
15:00 GMT	Paterson 18'; Austin 53'	Report		Stadium: Turf Moor; Attendance: 12,295 (1,096 away fans); Referee: Mark Heywood

6 November 2012 15	Hull City	2–1	Wolverhampton Wanderers	Kingston upon Hull
19:45 GMT	Aluko 29'; Simpson 51'	Report	Chester 67' (o.g.)	Stadium: KC Stadium; Attendance: 14,768 (501 away fans); Referee: David Webb

10 November 2012 16	Wolverhampton Wanderers	3–3	Brighton & Hove Albion	Wolverhampton
15:00 GMT	Sako 22'; Doumbia 61'; Johnson 90+2'	Report	Mackail-Smith 43'; Buckley 72'; Dobbie 89' (pen.)	Stadium: Molineux; Attendance: 21,203 (1,869 away fans); Referee: Scott Mathieson

17 November 2012 17	Watford	2–1	Wolverhampton Wanderers	Watford
15:00 GMT	Chalobah 35'; Deeney 68'	Report	Sako 54'	Stadium: Vicarage Road; Attendance: 13,588 (1,825 away fans); Referee: Graham Scott

24 November 2012 18	Wolverhampton Wanderers	1–2	Nottingham Forest	Wolverhampton
15:00 GMT	Sigurðarson 5'	Report	Sharp 16'; Guedioura 57'	Stadium: Molineux; Attendance: 22,527 (2,568 away fans); Referee: Roger East

27 November 2012 19	Wolverhampton Wanderers	0–1	Millwall	Wolverhampton
19:45 GMT		Report	Keogh 79'	Stadium: Molineux; Attendance: 18,174 (280 away fans); Referee: Michael Naylor

1 December 2012 20	Bristol City	1–4	Wolverhampton Wanderers	Bristol
15:00 GMT	Danns 85'	Report	Ebanks-Blake 20'; Doyle 25', 41'; Sigurðarson 44'	Stadium: Ashton Gate; Attendance: 13,892 (1,724 away fans); Referee: Keith Stroud

8 December 2012 21	Wolverhampton Wanderers	1–0	Birmingham City	Wolverhampton
17:20 GMT	King 34' (o.g.)	Report		Stadium: Molineux; Attendance: 21,339 (2,063 away fans); Referee: Anthony Taylor

15 December 2012 22	Middlesbrough	2–0	Wolverhampton Wanderers	Middlesbrough
15:00 GMT	Emnes 89' (pen.); McDonald 90+4'	Report		Stadium: Riverside Stadium; Attendance: 15,662 (699 away fans); Referee: Robert Madley

21 December 2012 23	Blackpool	1–2	Wolverhampton Wanderers	Blackpool
19:45 GMT	Baptiste 89'	Report	Ebanks-Blake 3', 72' (pen.)	Stadium: Bloomfield Road; Attendance: 14,556 (975 away fans); Referee: David Coote

26 December 2012 24	Wolverhampton Wanderers	0–3	Peterborough United	Wolverhampton
15:00 GMT		Report	Tomlin 17'; Rowe 43'; Gayle 69'	Stadium: Molineux; Attendance: 23,033 (532 away fans); Referee: Mark Heywood

29 December 2012 25	Wolverhampton Wanderers	0–2	Ipswich Town	Wolverhampton
15:00 GMT		Report	Cresswell 33'; Campbell 64'	Stadium: Molineux; Attendance: 28,595 (913 away fans); Referee: Darren Drysdale

1 January 2013 26	Crystal Palace	3–1	Wolverhampton Wanderers	London
15:00 GMT	Moritz 31', 52'; Bolasie 40'	Report	Ebanks-Blake 75'	Stadium: Selhurst Park; Attendance: 17,453 (1,033 away fans); Referee: David Phillips

11 January 2013 27	Wolverhampton Wanderers	1–1	Blackburn Rovers	Wolverhampton
19:45 GMT	Johnson 74'	Report	Rhodes 26' (pen.)	Stadium: Molineux; Attendance: 20,264 (494 away fans); Referee: Dean Whitestone

19 January 2013 28	Sheffield Wednesday	0–0	Wolverhampton Wanderers	Sheffield
15:00 GMT		Report		Stadium: Hillsborough; Attendance: 21,142 (1,531 away fans); Referee: Robert Madley

26 January 2013 29	Wolverhampton Wanderers	1–2	Blackpool	Wolverhampton
15:00 GMT	Ebanks-Blake 15'	Report	Ince 45', 78'	Stadium: Molineux; Attendance: 20,100 (520 away fans); Referee: Scott Mathieson

31 January 2013 30	Leicester City	2–1	Wolverhampton Wanderers	Leicester
19:45 GMT	Knockaert 24'; Nugent 73'	Report	Sako 51'	Stadium: King Power Stadium; Attendance: 21,677 (772 away fans); Referee: Robert Madley

9 February 2013 31	Wolverhampton Wanderers	2–2	Leeds United	Wolverhampton
15:00 GMT	Peltier 57' (o.g.); Batth 90+2'	Report	Varney 64'; McCormack 78' (pen.)	Stadium: Molineux; Attendance: 23,463 (2,570 away fans); Referee: Roger East

16 February 2013 32	Derby County	0–0	Wolverhampton Wanderers	Derby
15:00 GMT		Report		Stadium: Pride Park; Attendance: 23,036 (1,953 away fans); Referee: Graham Salisbury

19 February 2013 33	Barnsley	2–1	Wolverhampton Wanderers	Barnsley
19:45 GMT	Dagnall 49'; Mellis 73'	Report	Sigurðarson 7'	Stadium: Oakwell; Attendance: 10,972 (999 away fans); Referee: Darren Sheldrake

24 February 2013 34	Wolverhampton Wanderers	1–2	Cardiff City	Wolverhampton
14:00 GMT	Sako 70'	Report	Campbell 20', 67'	Stadium: Molineux; Attendance: 20,930 (2,516 away fans); Referee: Stuart Attwell

1 March 2013 35	Wolverhampton Wanderers	1–1	Watford	Wolverhampton
19:45 GMT	Sako 90+3'	Report	Abdi 41'	Stadium: Molineux; Attendance: 18,571 (725 away fans); Referee: Paul Tierney

4 March 2013 36	Millwall	0–2	Wolverhampton Wanderers	London
19:45 GMT		Report	Edwards 9'; Ebanks-Blake 61'	Stadium: The Den; Attendance: 8,727 (626 away fans); Referee: Mick Russell

9 March 2013 37	Nottingham Forest	3–1	Wolverhampton Wanderers	Nottingham
19:45 GMT	Lansbury 31', 67'; McGugan 90'	Report	Doherty 65'	Stadium: City Ground; Attendance: 23,350 (2,267 away fans); Referee: Michael Naylor

16 March 2013 38	Wolverhampton Wanderers	2–1	Bristol City	Wolverhampton
19:45 GMT	Ebanks-Blake 76'; Doyle 78'	Report	Davis 25' (o.g.)	Stadium: Molineux; Attendance: 21,711 (1,865 away fans); Referee: Geoff Eltringham

30 March 2013 39	Wolverhampton Wanderers	3–2	Middlesbrough	Wolverhampton
15:00 GMT	McManus 17' (o.g.); Sigurðarson 48'; Doyle 70'	Report	Leadbitter 25', 52'	Stadium: Molineux; Attendance: 21,277 (606 away fans); Referee: Anthony Bates

1 April 2013 40	Birmingham City	2–3	Wolverhampton Wanderers	Birmingham
15:00 BST	Elliott 55' (pen.) (penalty missed) 90+6' 90+6'	Report	Hunt 20'; Ebanks-Blake 27', 37' (pen.)	Stadium: St Andrew's; Attendance: 19,630 (1,623 away fans); Referee: Carl Boyeson

6 April 2013 41	Bolton Wanderers	2–0	Wolverhampton Wanderers	Bolton
15:00 BST	Ngog 3'; Alonso 10'	Report		Stadium: Reebok Stadium; Attendance: 18,432 (1,385 away fans); Referee: Andy D'Urso

13 April 2013 42	Wolverhampton Wanderers	1–3	Huddersfield Town	Wolverhampton
15:00 BST	Ward 4'	Report	Scannell 27'; Beckford 69', 70'	Stadium: Molineux; Attendance: 23,185 (1,890 away fans); Referee: Keith Stroud

16 April 2013 43	Wolverhampton Wanderers	1–0	Hull City	Wolverhampton
19:45 BST	Doyle 55'	Report		Stadium: Molineux; Attendance: 19,641 (1,454 away fans); Referee: Andy Woolmer

20 April 2013 44	Charlton Athletic	2–1	Wolverhampton Wanderers	London
15:00 BST	Dervite 63'; Obika 90'	Report	Doyle 66'	Stadium: The Valley; Attendance: 19,023 (1,968 away fans); Referee: Roger East

27 April 2013 45	Wolverhampton Wanderers	1–2	Burnley	Wolverhampton
15:00 BST	Dicko 88'	Report	Ings 8'; Paterson 53'	Stadium: Molineux; Attendance: 24,199 (949 away fans); Referee: Darren Sheldrake

4 May 2013 46	Brighton & Hove Albion	2–0	Wolverhampton Wanderers	Brighton
12:45 BST	LuaLua 5', 39'	Report		Stadium: Falmer Stadium; Attendance: 30,003 (1,994 away fans); Referee: Simon Hooper

Final table

Pos	Team	Pld	W	D	L	GF	GA	GD	Pts	Promotion or relegation
21	Barnsley	46	14	13	19	56	70	−14	55	
22	Peterborough United (R)	46	15	9	22	66	75	−9	54	Relegation to Football League One
23	Wolverhampton Wanderers (R)	46	14	9	23	55	69	−14	51	Relegation to Football League One
24	Bristol City (R)	46	11	8	27	59	84	−25	41	Relegation to Football League One

Updated to match(es) played on 4 May 2013. Source: BBC Sport
Rules for classification: 1) points; 2) goal difference; 3) number of goals scored.
(R) Relegated

Results summary

Overall								Home						Away					
Pld	W	D	L	GF	GA	GD	Pts	W	D	L	GF	GA	GD	W	D	L	GF	GA	GD
46	14	9	23	55	69	−14	51	7	7	9	30	35	−5	7	2	14	25	34	−9

Source: Statto.com

Results by round

Round	1	2	3	4	5	6	7	8	9	10	11	12	13	14	15	16	17	18	19	20	21	22	23	24	25	26	27	28	29	30	31	32	33	34	35	36	37	38	39	40	41	42	43	44	45	46
Result	L	W	D	L	W	W	W	W	L	W	L	D	D	L	L	D	L	L	L	W	W	L	W	L	L	L	D	D	L	L	D	D	L	L	D	W	L	W	W	W	L	L	W	L	L	L
Position	17	9	11	19	10	7	5	3	5	3	5	5	8	9	13	15	16	17	18	17	16	18	13	15	17	18	17	17	18	19	21	21	22	22	22	21	21	23	22	18	19	23	21	22	23	23

Source: Statto.com
W = Win; D = Draw; L = Loss

=== FA Cup ===
5 January 2013 3rd Round	Luton Town	1–0	Wolverhampton Wanderers	Luton
15:00 GMT	Lawless 46'	Report		Stadium: Kenilworth Road; Attendance: 9,638 (1,450 away fans); Referee: Geoff Eltrigham

=== League Cup ===
11 August 2012 1st Round	Wolverhampton Wanderers	1–1 (a.e.t.) (7–6 p)	Aldershot Town	Wolverhampton
15:00 BST	Ebanks-Blake 53'	Report	Rankine 62'	Stadium: Molineux; Attendance: 11,555 (607 away fans); Referee: James Adcock
	Penalties
	Ebanks-Blake (penalty scored); Hunt (penalty scored); Ward (penalty scored); Johnson (penalty scored); Henry (penalty scored); Nouble (penalty scored); Forde (penalty scored)		(penalty scored) Payne; (penalty scored) Reid; (penalty scored) Rankine; (penalty scored) Rodman; (penalty scored) Herd; (penalty scored) Morris; (penalty missed) Roberts

30 August 2012 2nd Round	Northampton Town	1–3	Wolverhampton Wanderers	Northampton
19:45 BST	Platt 40'	Report	Batth 16'; Nouble 45+1'; Sako 90+1'	Stadium: Sixfields; Attendance: 3,758 (671 away fans); Referee: Darren Deadman

25 September 2012 3rd Round	Chelsea	6–0	Wolverhampton Wanderers	London
19:45 BST	Cahill 4'; Bertrand 8'; Mata 17'; Romeu 53' (pen.); Torres 58'; Moses 71'	Report		Stadium: Stamford Bridge; Attendance: 32,569 (989 away fans); Referee: Neil Swarbrick

== Players ==
=== Statistics ===
Key:
‡ On loan from another club * First appearance(s) for the club

- # = Squad number
- Pos = Playing position
- P = Number of games played
- G = Number of goals scored
- GK = Goalkeeper
- DF = Defender
- MF = Midfielder
- FW = Forward
- = Yellow cards
- = Red cards
- † Permanent player left club during the season
- ¤ Loaned to another club for part or all of season

Correct as of end of season. Starting appearances are listed first, followed by substitute appearances in parentheses where applicable.

No.	Pos	Name	P	G	P	G	P	G	P	G	A yellow card	A red card	Notes
No.	Pos	Name	League		FA Cup		League Cup		Total		Discipline		Notes
1	GK	(Wales) Wayne Hennessey	0	0	0	0	0	0	0	0	0	0	
3	DF	(Cameroon) George Elokobi ¤	1(1)	0	0	0	1	0	2(1)	0	0	0	
4	MF	(Wales) David Edwards	14(10)	2	0	0	1	0	15(10)	2	1	0	
5	DF	(England) Richard Stearman ¤	8(4)	1	0	0	3	0	11(4)	1	1	0	
6	DF	(England) Jody Craddock	0	0	0	0	0	0	0	0	0	0	
7	MF	(England) Michael Kightly †	0	0	0	0	0	0	0	0	0	0	
7	MF	(Poland) Sławomir Peszko ‡	7(6)	0	0(1)	0	1(1)	0	8(8)	0	3	0	
8	MF	(England) Karl Henry (c)	36(3)	0	1	0	1	0	38(3)	0	8	1	
9	FW	(England) Sylvan Ebanks-Blake	31(9)	14	1	0	1	1	33(9)	15	6	0	
10	FW	(Scotland) Steven Fletcher †	0	0	0	0	0	0	0	0	0	0	
10	MF	(France) Bakary Sako	36(1)	9	1	0	0(1)	1	37(2)	10	3	0	
11	DF	(Republic of Ireland) Stephen Ward	37(2)	2	1	0	1	0	39(2)	2	2	1	
12	MF	(Republic of Ireland) Stephen Hunt	8(4)	1	0	0	1(1)	0	9(5)	1	1	0	
13	GK	(Nigeria) Carl Ikeme	38	0	1	0	2	0	41	0	0	0	
14	DF	(England) Roger Johnson	42	2	1	0	1	0	44	2	7	1	
15	FW	(Iceland) Björn Sigurðarson	22(15)	5	0	0	2	0	24(15)	5	2	0	
16	DF	(Scotland) Christophe Berra	30	0	1	0	0(1)	0	31(1)	0	1	1	
17	MF	(England) Matt Jarvis †	2	0	0	0	0	0	2	0	0	0	
17	MF	(Togo) Razak Boukari	2(2)	0	0	0	2	0	4(2)	0	2	0	
18	FW	(England) Frank Nouble †	0(2)	0	0	0	1(2)	1	1(4)	1	0	0	
18	GK	(Slovakia) Marián Kello	0	0	0	0	0	0	0	0	0	0	
19	MF	(England) Adam Hammill ¤	0(4)	0	0	0	0	0	0(4)	0	0	0	
20	MF	(Serbia) Nenad Milijaš †	0	0	0	0	0	0	0	0	0	0	
20	MF	(England) Jermaine Pennant ‡	10(5)	0	0	0	0	0	10(5)	0	2	0	
20	DF	(England) Jack Robinson ‡	11	0	0	0	0	0	11	0	1	0	
21	DF	(France) Steven Mouyokolo †	0	0	0	0	0	0	0	0	0	0	
21	DF	(Latvia) Kaspars Gorkšs ‡	15	0	0	0	0	0	15	0	2	0	
22	MF	(Iceland) Eggert Jónsson ¤	0(1)	0	0	0	1	0	1(1)	0	1	0	
23	DF	(Guadeloupe) Ronald Zubar †	7(1)	0	0	0	2	0	9(1)	0	0	0	
23	MF	(France) Nouha Dicko ‡	1(3)	1	0	0	0	0	1(3)	1	1	0	
24	MF	(England) Jamie O'Hara	15(5)	0	1	0	0	0	16(5)	0	5	1	
25	DF	(England) Danny Batth	5(7)	1	0	0	2	1	7(7)	2	0	0	
26	MF	(England) David Davis	12(16)	0	0(1)	0	3	0	15(17)	0	4	0	
27	MF	(Republic of Ireland) Anthony Forde ¤	1(11)	0	1	0	2(1)	0	4(12)	0	0	0	
28	MF	(Mali) Tongo Doumbia ‡	27(6)	2	0	0	1(1)	0	28(7)	2	2	0	
29	FW	(Republic of Ireland) Kevin Doyle	40(2)	9	1	0	1	0	42(2)	9	2	0	
30	DF	(Republic of Ireland) Matt Doherty ¤	13	1	0	0	0	0	13	1	5	0	
31	GK	(Netherlands) Dorus de Vries	8(2)	0	0	0	1	0	9(2)	0	0	0	
32	DF	(Republic of Ireland) Kevin Foley	24(2)	0	1	0	0	0	25(2)	0	1	0	
33	DF	(England) Jamie Reckord ¤	0	0	0	0	0	0	0	0	0	0	
34	DF	(Austria) Georg Margreitter	0(1)	0	0	0	2	0	2(1)	0	0	0	
35	FW	(Wales) Jake Cassidy ¤	3(3)	0	0(1)	0	0	0	3(4)	0	0	0	
36	GK	(Republic of Ireland) Aaron McCarey ¤	0	0	0	0	0	0	0	0	0	0	
37	FW	(England) Sam Winnall ¤	0	0	0	0	0	0	0	0	0	0	
39	DF	(England) Michael Ihiekwe	0	0	0	0	0	0	0	0	0	0	
41	MF	(England) Jack Price	0	0	0	0	0	0	0	0	0	0	
42	MF	(Sweden) Tim Jakobsson	0	0	0	0	0	0	0	0	0	0	
43	GK	(Slovenia) Aljaž Cotman	0	0	0	0	0	0	0	0	0	0	
44	DF	(Slovakia) Kristián Koštrna	0	0	0	0	0	0	0	0	0	0	
45	DF	(Wales) Jordan Cranston	0	0	0	0	0	0	0	0	0	0	
46	MF	(England) Sam Whittall	0	0	0	0	0	0	0	0	0	0	
47	MF	(England) Zeli Ismail ¤	0	0	0	0	0(1)	0	0(1)	0	0	0	
48	FW	(England) Jake Kempton	0	0	0	0	0	0	0	0	0	0	
49	FW	(Northern Ireland) Liam McAlinden	0(1)	0	0	0	0	0	0(1)	0	0	0	
50	DF	(England) Jamie Tank	0	0	0	0	0	0	0	0	0	0	

=== Awards ===
Award	Winner
Fans' Player of the Season	Bakary Sako

== Transfers ==
=== In ===
Date	Player	From	Fee
22 June 2012	(England) Frank Nouble	West Ham United	Free
17 July 2012	(Iceland) Björn Sigurðarson	(Norway) Lillestrøm	£2.4 million
24 August 2012	(Austria) Georg Margreitter	Austria Vienna	£500,000
27 August 2012	(Togo) Razak Boukari	(France) Rennes	Undisclosed
29 August 2012	(France) Bakary Sako	(France) Saint-Étienne	£2.7 million
30 August 2012	(Sweden) Tim Jakobsson	(Sweden) IK Frej	Free
30 August 2012	(England) Regan Upton	Burton Albion	Free
13 November 2012	(Mali) Tongo Doumbia	(France) Rennes	£2 million
28 March 2013	(Slovakia) Marián Kello	Unattached	Free

=== Out ===
Date	Player	To	Fee
June 2012	(England) Oliver Bashford	Released	Free
June 2012	(England) Ashley Hemmings	Released	Free
June 2012	(England) Josh Shepherd	Released	Free
June 2012	(England) James Spray	Released	Free
11 June 2012	(England) Louis Harris	AFC Wimbledon	Free
6 July 2012	(England) Nathaniel Mendez-Laing	Peterborough United	Undisclosed
23 July 2012	(Algeria) Adlène Guedioura	Nottingham Forest	Undisclosed
31 July 2012	(Wales) Sam Vokes	Burnley	£350,000
8 August 2012	(England) Michael Kightly	Stoke City	Undisclosed
24 August 2012	(England) Matt Jarvis	West Ham United	£10.75 million
24 August 2012	(Scotland) Steven Fletcher	Sunderland	£14 million
30 August 2012	(Serbia) Nenad Milijaš	Released	Free
8 January 2013	(England) Frank Nouble	Ipswich Town	Undisclosed
30 January 2013	(France) Steven Mouyokolo	Released	Free
30 January 2013	(Guadeloupe) Ronald Zubar	(France) Ajaccio	Free

=== Loans in ===
Date	Player	From	End Date
30 July 2012	(Mali) Tongo Doumbia	(France) Rennes	13 November 2012
9 August 2012	(Poland) Sławomir Peszko	(Germany) Köln	End of season
12 October 2012	(England) Jermaine Pennant	Stoke City	12 January 2013
12 February 2013	(Latvia) Kaspars Gorkšs	Reading	End of season
18 February 2013	(England) Jack Robinson	Liverpool	End of season
28 March 2013	(France) Nouha Dicko	Wigan Athletic	End of season

=== Loans out ===
Date	Player	To	End Date
21 July 2012	(Scotland) Leigh Griffiths	(Scotland) Hibernian	20 January 2013
2 August 2012	(Wales) Jake Cassidy	Tranmere Rovers	1 January 2013
6 August 2012	(Northern Ireland) Johnny Gorman	Plymouth Argyle	6 January 2013
31 August 2012	(England) Adam Hammill	Huddersfield Town	13 January 2013
21 September 2012	(England) Jamie Reckord	Coventry City	30 November 2012
26 September 2012	(Cameroon) George Elokobi	Bristol City	27 December 2012
28 September 2012	(England) Sam Winnall	Shrewsbury Town	28 October 2012
4 October 2012	(Republic of Ireland) Matt Doherty	Bury	3 January 2013
9 November 2012	(England) Ethan Ebanks-Landell	Bury	3 January 2013
9 November 2012	(Iceland) Eggert Jónsson	Charlton Athletic	6 December 2013
16 November 2012	(Republic of Ireland) Aaron McCarey	Walsall	31 December 2012
22 November 2012	(England) Zeli Ismail	Milton Keynes Dons	2 January 2013
4 January 2013	(England) Zeli Ismail	Milton Keynes Dons	8 February 2013
10 January 2013	(England) Ethan Ebanks-Landell	Bury	End of season
29 January 2013	(England) Richard Stearman	Ipswich Town	End of season
31 January 2013	(Northern Ireland) Johnny Gorman	Macclesfield Town	1 March 2013
21 February 2013	(Republic of Ireland) Aaron McCarey	Walsall	End of season
14 March 2013	(Republic of Ireland) Anthony Forde	Scunthorpe United	End of season
15 March 2013	(Northern Ireland) Johnny Gorman	Cambridge United	End of season

== Management and coaching staff ==
Position	Name
Manager	Ståle Solbakken (until 5 January), then Dean Saunders
Assistant manager	Terry Connor (until 3 September), then Johan Lange (19 October–5 January), Brian Carey (8 January onward)
First Team coach	Johan Lange (until 19 October), then Patrick Weiser (19 October–5 January) before role ended
Development coach	Steve Weaver
First Team Fitness and Conditioning coach	Tony Daley
Goalkeeping coach	Pat Mountain
Academy Manager	Kevin Thelwell
Assistant Academy Manager / Under-18's coach	Mick Halsall
Club Doctor	Dr Matthew Perry
Club Physio	Phil Hayward

== Kit ==
The season brought both new home and away kits manufactured, for the final year of their contract, by BURRDA. The new home kit featured the club's traditional gold and black colours, with the shirt having a gold collar. The away kit was a teal kit, reviving the colours used in their 1996–97 change strip. Both shirts featured the internet gambling company Sportingbet.com as sponsor for the final time.
