= 2016–17 Chesterfield F.C. season =

Chesterfield
2016–17 season
- Chairman: Dave Allen (until 14 November); Mike Warner (since 18 November)
- Manager: Danny Wilson (until 8 January); Gary Caldwell (from 17 January)
- Stadium: Proact Stadium
- League One: 24th (relegated)
- FA Cup: Second round
- League Cup: First round
- Football League Trophy: Third round
- Top goalscorer: League: Kristian Dennis (8); All: Kristian Dennis (10)
- Highest home attendance: 8,451 (vs. Sheffield United, 13 November 2016)
- Lowest home attendance: 950 (vs. Wolverhampton Wanderers U23, 30 August 2016)
Home colours	Away colours	Third colours

The 2016–17 season was Chesterfield's 150th season in their history and their third consecutive season in League One. Along with League One, the club participated in the FA Cup, League Cup and EFL Trophy.

The season covered the period from 1 July 2016 to 30 June 2017.

== Players ==
=== Current squad ===
As of 14 March 2017

Note: Flags indicate national team as defined under FIFA eligibility rules; some limited exceptions apply. Players may hold more than one non-FIFA nationality.

No.	Pos.	Nation	Player
1	GK	ENG	Tommy Lee
2	DF	SCO	Paul McGinn
3	DF	ENG	Daniel Jones
4	DF	ENG	Sam Hird (vice-captain)
6	DF	ENG	Ian Evatt (captain)
7	MF	ENG	Dan Gardner
8	MF	ESP	Ángel
9	FW	WAL	Ched Evans
10	FW	ENG	Sylvan Ebanks-Blake
11	MF	ENG	Reece Mitchell
12	GK	SCO	Ryan Fulton (on loan from Liverpool)
15	FW	FRA	David Faupala (on loan from Manchester City)
17	MF	IRL	Connor Dimaio
18	MF	ENG	Jon Nolan
19	MF	WAL	Dion Donohue
20	FW	ENG	Kristian Dennis
21	GK	ENG	Lloyd Allinson

No.	Pos.	Nation	Player
22	FW	BER	Rai Simons
23	DF	ENG	Tom Anderson (on loan from Burnley)
24	DF	ENG	Osman Kakay (on loan from Queens Park Rangers)
25	DF	ENG	Ritchie Humphreys (player-coach)
27	DF	ENG	Laurence Maguire
28	MF	ENG	Liam Grimshaw (on loan from Preston North End)
29	FW	ENG	Jake Beesley
30	FW	ENG	Curtis Morrison
32	DF	LBA	Sadiq El Fitouri
33	DF	NZL	Liam Graham
34	DF	NGR	Ify Ofoegbu
35	FW	ENG	Ricky German
36	GK	ENG	Dylan Parkin
38	GK	GER	Thorsten Stuckmann
39	MF	ENG	Joe Rowley
40	GK	ENG	Matt Duke (player/goalkeeper coach)
42	MF	ENG	Charlie Wakefield

=== Out on loan ===
Note: Flags indicate national team as defined under FIFA eligibility rules; some limited exceptions apply. Players may hold more than one non-FIFA nationality.

No.	Pos.	Nation	Player
16	DF	ENG	Charlie Raglan (at Oxford United until the end of the season)
26	MF	IRL	Jay O'Shea (at Sheffield United until the end of the season)

== Transfers ==
=== Transfers in ===
Date from	Position	Nationality	Name	From	Fee	Ref.
1 July 2016	CF	ENG	Kristian Dennis	Stockport County	Free transfer	
1 July 2016	CF	WAL	Ched Evans	Free agent	Free transfer	
1 July 2016	RB	SCO	Paul McGinn	Dundee	Free transfer	
1 July 2016	LW	ENG	Reece Mitchell	Chelsea	Free transfer	
1 July 2016	CM	ENG	Jon Nolan	Grimsby Town	Free transfer	
4 August 2016	GK	ENG	Lloyd Allinson	Huddersfield Town	Free transfer	
2 February 2017	RB	LBY	Sadiq El Fitouri	Manchester United	Free transfer	
18 February 2017	GK	GER	Thorsten Stuckmann	Partick Thistle	Free transfer	

=== Transfers out ===
Date from	Position	Nationality	Name	To	Fee	Ref.
1 July 2016	GK	ENG	Aaron Chapman	Accrington Stanley (Note: Following Chapman's release, he signed for Accrington Stanley.)	Released	
1 July 2016	CF	ENG	Emmanuel Dieseruvwe	Kidderminster Harriers (Note: Following Dieseruvwe's release, he signed for Kidderminster Harriers.)	Released	
1 July 2016	CF	ENG	Byron Harrison	Barrow (Note: Following Harrison's release, he signed for Barrow.)	Released	
1 July 2016	DM	AUS	Chris Herd	Gillingham (Note: Following Herd's release, he signed for Gillingham.)	Released	
1 July 2016	CM	ENG	Michael Onovwigun	Dulwich Hamlet (Note: Following Onovwigun's release, he signed for Dulwich Hamlet.)	Released	
1 July 2016	CF	ENG	Jordan Slew	Plymouth Argyle (Note: Following Slew's release, he signed for Plymouth Argyle.)	Released	
1 July 2016	RB	ENG	Drew Talbot	Portsmouth (Note: Following Talbot's release, he signed for Portsmouth.)	Released	
1 July 2016	CF	ENG	Jake Orrell	Hartlepool United	Free transfer	
19 July 2016	AM	ENG	Ollie Banks	Oldham Athletic	Free transfer	
13 January 2017	CM	ENG	Gary Liddle	Carlisle United	Undisclosed	
31 January 2017	RW	USA	Gboly Ariyibi	Nottingham Forest	Undisclosed	
31 January 2017	DM	ENG	Liam O'Neil	Cambridge United	Undisclosed	
22 February 2017	LW	IRL	Derek Daly	Waterford	Undisclosed	

=== Loans in ===
Date from	Position	Nationality	Name	From	Date until	Ref.
10 July 2016	GK	SCO	Ryan Fulton	Liverpool	End of Season	
31 August 2016	CB	ENG	Tom Anderson	Burnley	End of Season	
31 August 2016	CF	IRL	Conor Wilkinson	Bolton Wanderers	9 January 2017	
31 January 2017	CM	ENG	Reece Brown	Birmingham City	14 March 2017 (Note: Brown's loan was ended early on 14 March 2017.)	
31 January 2017	CF	FRA	David Faupala	Manchester City	End of Season	
31 January 2017	DM	ENG	Liam Grimshaw	Preston North End	End of Season	
31 January 2017	RB	ENG	Osman Kakay	Queens Park Rangers	End of Season	

=== Loans out ===
Date from	Position	Nationality	Name	To	Date until	Ref.
31 August 2016	CF	ENG	Sylvan Ebanks-Blake	Shrewsbury Town	9 January 2017	
31 August 2016	CB	ENG	Charlie Raglan	Oxford United	End of season (Note: On 3 January 2017, Raglan's loan at Oxford United was extended until the end of the season.)	
24 January 2017	AM	IRL	Jay O'Shea	Sheffield United	End of season	

== Competitions ==
=== Pre-season friendlies ===
16 July 2016 Friendly	Chesterfield	0–2	Sheffield Wednesday	Chesterfield
13:00 BST		Report	Lee 13'; Forestieri 28'	Stadium: Proact Stadium

19 July 2016 Friendly	Matlock Town	1–3	Chesterfield	Matlock
19:30 BST	Cribley 67'	Report	Dennis 35', 41'; Evatt 85'	Stadium: Causeway Lane

23 July 2016 Friendly	Ilkeston	0–3	Chesterfield	Ilkeston
15:00 BST		Report	Humphreys 47'; Evans 53'; Beesley 83'	Stadium: New Manor Ground; Attendance: 317

26 July 2016 Friendly	Chesterfield	1–2	Derby County	Chesterfield
19:30 BST	O'Shea 56'	Report	Bent 52'; Rawson 66'	Stadium: Proact Stadium

30 July 2016 Friendly	Buxton	0–0	Chesterfield	Buxton
15:00 BST				Stadium: The Silverlands

2 August 2016 Friendly	Chesterfield	3–1	Leicester City	Chesterfield
19:30 BST	Evans 55'; Liddle 62'; O'Shea 62' (pen.)		Martis 25'	Stadium: Proact Stadium

=== League One ===
==== League table ====
Pos	Team	Pld	W	D	L	GF	GA	GD	Pts	Promotion, qualification or relegation
20	Gillingham	46	12	14	20	59	79	−20	50	
21	Port Vale (R)	46	12	13	21	45	70	−25	49	Relegation to EFL League Two
22	Swindon Town (R)	46	11	11	24	44	66	−22	44	Relegation to EFL League Two
23	Coventry City (R)	46	9	12	25	37	68	−31	39	Relegation to EFL League Two
24	Chesterfield (R)	46	9	10	27	43	78	−35	37	Relegation to EFL League Two

Source: BBC Sport
Rules for classification: 1) Points; 2) Goal difference; 3) Number of goals scored
(R) Relegated

==== Matches ====
6 August 2016 1	Oxford United	1–1	Chesterfield	Oxford
15:00 BST	Thomas 31'; Ruffels (yellow card) 75'	Report	Raglan (yellow card) 8'; Nolan (yellow card) 73'; Evans 76'	Stadium: Kassam Stadium; Attendance: 8,679; Referee: Gavin Ward

13 August 2016 2	Chesterfield	3–1	Swindon Town	Chesterfield
15:00 BST	Liddle 22'; O'Shea 45' (pen.); Evans 64'	Report	Kasim (yellow card) 45'; Ormonde-Ottewill (yellow card) 60'; Furlong (yellow card) 62', (goal) 88'; Sendles-White (yellow card) 84'	Stadium: Proact Stadium; Attendance: 5,378; Referee: Carl Boyeson

16 August 2016 3	Chesterfield	2–0	Walsall	Chesterfield
19:45 BST	Nolan (yellow card) 37'; Evans 75', 79'	Report		Stadium: Proact Stadium; Attendance: 5,406; Referee: Graham Salisbury

20 August 2016 4	Shrewsbury Town	2–1	Chesterfield	Shrewsbury
15:00 BST	Brown 24', (yellow card) 70'; McGivern (yellow card) 62'; Toney (yellow card) 81'; El-Abd 84'	Report	O'Shea 14'; Gardner (yellow card) 38'; Evatt (yellow card) 90'	Stadium: New Meadow; Attendance: 4,936; Referee: Ben Toner

27 August 2016 5	Chesterfield	1–3	Millwall	Chesterfield
15:00 BST	Hird 65'	Report	Ferguson 13'; Morison 38', 41'; Archer (yellow card) 68'; Williams (yellow card) 71'	Stadium: Proact Stadium; Attendance: 5,630; Referee: Lee Probert

3 September 2016 6	AFC Wimbledon	2–1	Chesterfield	Kingston upon Thames
15:00 BST	Robinson 53'; Elliott (yellow card) 78'; Poleon 90'	Report	Charles 35' (o.g.); Evans (yellow card) 90'	Stadium: Kingsmeadow; Attendance: 4,425; Referee: Kevin Johnson

10 September 2016 7	Oldham Athletic	0–0	Chesterfield	Oldham
15:00 BST	Erwin (yellow card) 21'; Clarke (yellow card) 28'; Flynn (yellow card) 48'	Report	Wilkinson (yellow card) 19'; Anderson (yellow card) 39'; Dimaio (yellow card) 64'	Stadium: Boundary Park; Attendance: 3,457; Referee: Mark Heywood

17 September 2016 8	Chesterfield	3–1	Northampton Town	Chesterfield
15:00 BST	Wilkinson 7', 49'; Dennis 70', (yellow card) 82'; Nolan (yellow card) 77'	Report	McCourt (yellow card) 44'; Anderson 62'	Stadium: Proact Stadium; Attendance: 5,910; Referee: Robert Jones

24 September 2016 9	Bury	2–1	Chesterfield	Bury
15:00 BST	Ismail 41'; Danns (yellow card) 69'; Pope 87'	Report	Dennis 44'; Anderson (yellow card) 45'	Stadium: Gigg Lane; Attendance: 3,494; Referee: Dean Whitestone

27 September 2016 10	Chesterfield	3–3	Gillingham	Chesterfield
19:45 BST	Wilkinson 2', 72'; Dennis 52' (pen.), (yellow card) 90'; Anderson (yellow card) 64'	Report	Knott (yellow card) 49'; Emmanuel-Thomas 65' (pen.), 76' (pen.); Wagstaff 90'; Oldaker (yellow card) 90'	Stadium: Proact Stadium; Attendance: 4,714; Referee: Trevor Kettle

1 October 2016 11	Chesterfield	0–1	Bradford City	Chesterfield
15:00 BST	Hird (yellow card) 68'; Nolan (yellow card) 72'	Report	Clarke 26'	Stadium: Proact Stadium; Attendance: 6,997

15 October 2016 12	Southend United	1–0	Chesterfield	Southend-on-Sea
15:00 BST	Coker (yellow card) 14'; Thompson 29'; Wordsworth (yellow card) 77'; Leonard (yellow card) 90'	Report	Anderson (yellow card) 73'	Stadium: Roots Hall; Attendance: 6,004; Referee: Kevin Johnson

18 October 2016 13	Chesterfield	0–1	Fleetwood Town	Chesterfield
19:45 BST	O'Neil (yellow card) 51'; Evans (yellow card) 83'; McGinn (yellow card) 90'	Report	McLaughlin 41'; Grant (yellow card) 66'; Bell (yellow card) 70'	Stadium: Proact Stadium; Attendance: 4,598; Referee: Ross Joyce

22 October 2016 14	Chesterfield	0–3	Scunthorpe United	Chesterfield
15:00 BST	Donohue (yellow card) 47'; Anderson (yellow card) 83'	Report	Morris 49' van Veen 60'; Dawson (yellow card) 79'; Mantom 85'	Stadium: Proact Stadium; Attendance: 6,328; Referee: Oliver Langford

29 October 2016 15	Charlton Athletic	1–0	Chesterfield	Charlton
15:00 BST	Fox (yellow card) 17'; Magennis (yellow card) 70'; Novak 86'	Report	Graham (yellow card) 19'	Stadium: The Valley; Attendance: 10,153; Referee: John Busby

1 November 2016 16	Coventry City	2–0	Chesterfield	Coventry
19:45 GMT	Page (yellow card) 44' (yellow-red card) 90'; Willis 69'; Rose 81'; Bigirimana (yellow card) 85'	Report	Evatt (yellow card) 88'; Liddle (yellow card) 89'	Stadium: Ricoh Arena; Attendance: 7,941; Referee: John Brooks

13 November 2016 17	Chesterfield	1–4	Sheffield United	Chesterfield
14:15 GMT	Nolan 2'	Report	Freeman 53' (yellow card) 54'; Fleck 71'; Sharp 72'; Clarke 80'	Stadium: Proact Stadium; Attendance: 8,451; Referee: Chris Sarginson

19 November 2016 18	Fleetwood Town	2–1	Chesterfield	Fleetwood
15:00 GMT	Bell 27'; Bolger (yellow card) 51'; Nirennold 62'; Grant (yellow card) 88'	Report	O'Shea 66' (pen.)	Stadium: Highbury Stadium; Attendance: 2,901; Referee: Seb Stockbridge

22 November 2016 19	Milton Keynes Dons	2–3	Chesterfield	Milton Keynes
19:45 GMT	Powell 67'; Colclough 73'	Report	O'Shea 32' (pen.) (yellow card) 65'; Evatt (yellow card) 33'; O'Neil (yellow card) 66'; Dennis 77'; Gardner 80' (yellow card) 88'; Donohue (yellow card) 87'	Stadium: Stadium mk Attendance: 7,429; Referee: Gavin Ward

26 November 2016 20	Chesterfield	3–2	Bristol Rovers	Chesterfield
15:00 GMT	Dimaio (yellow card) 25'; Evatt 28'; Mitchell (yellow card) 31'; O'Shea 37', 50'	Report	Hartley 3'; Leadbitter (yellow card) 26'; Lockyer (yellow card) 45'; Lines (yellow card) 63'; Bodin 76'; Clarke (yellow card) 87'	Stadium: Proact Stadium; Attendance: 6,330; Referee: Andy Haines

10 December 2016 21	Peterborough United	5–2	Chesterfield	Peterborough
15:00 GMT	Nichols 1', 65'; Bostwick 45', 82' (yellow card) 63'; Taylor 55'; Inman (yellow card) 85'	Report	O'Neil (yellow card) 12' (goal) 25'; Evans 22'; Daly (yellow card) 80'	Stadium: London Road; Attendance: 5,120; Referee: Nigel Miller

17 December 2016 22	Chesterfield	1–0	Bolton Wanderers	Chesterfield
15:00 GMT	O'Neil 26'; Evans (yellow card) 90'	Report	Taylor (yellow card) 40'; Wheater (yellow card) 84'; Vela (yellow card) 88'	Stadium: Proact Stadium; Attendance: 6,924; Referee: Mark Haywood

26 December 2016 23	Rochdale	3–0	Chesterfield	Rochdale
15:00 GMT	Henderson (yellow card) 10' (goal) 44', 84'; Andrew 59'; Rathbone (yellow card) 88'	Report	Dimaio (yellow card) 49'	Stadium: Spotland; Attendance: 3,863; Referee: Carl Boyeson

30 December 2016 24	Port Vale	1–0	Chesterfield	Stoke-on-Trent
19:45 GMT	Knops (yellow card) 21'; Taylor (yellow card) 26'; Thomas 61'	Report	Donohue (yellow card) 27'; Hird (yellow card) 69'; Evatt (yellow card) 73'	Stadium: Vale Park; Attendance: 4,027; Referee: Michael Salisbury

2 January 2017 25	Chesterfield	0–0	Milton Keynes Dons	Chesterfield
15:00 GMT		Report		Stadium: Proact Stadium; Attendance: 5,554; Referee: Darren England

7 January 2017 26	Bradford City	2–0	Chesterfield	Bradford
15:00 GMT	Marshall 22'; Hiwula-Mayifuila 45'; Cullen (yellow card) 68'	Report	Donohue (yellow card) 89'	Stadium: The Coral Windows Stadium; Attendance: 17,416; Referee: Trevor Kettle

14 January 2017 27	Chesterfield	1–0	Coventry City	Chesterfield
15:00 GMT	Gardner 77'; Evans (yellow card) 83'	Report	Haynes (yellow card) 90+6'; Beavon (yellow card) 90+11'	Stadium: Proact Stadium; Attendance: 5,896; Referee: Nick Kinseley

21 January 2017 28	Chesterfield	0–0	AFC Wimbledon	Chesterfield
15:00 GMT	Nolan (yellow card) 28'; Hird (yellow card) 77'	Report	Charles (yellow card) 65'; Francomb (yellow card) 90'	Stadium: Proact Stadium; Attendance: 6,379; Referee: Eddie Ilderton

4 February 2017 29	Chesterfield	0–1	Oldham Athletic	Chesterfield
15:00 GMT		Report	Gerrard (yellow card) 31' (yellow-red card) 45+3'; Clarke (yellow card) 86' (goal) 90+1'; Ripley (yellow card) 86'; Amadi-Holloway (yellow card) 90+3'	Stadium: Proact Stadium; Attendance: 6,375; Referee: Ross Joyce

11 February 2017 30	Northampton Town	3–1	Chesterfield	Northampton
15:00 GMT	O'Toole 12', 42'; Richards 48'	Report	Faupala 54'; Ángel (yellow card) 88'	Stadium: Sixfields Stadium; Attendance: 5,824; Referee: Richard Clark

14 February 2017 31	Gillingham	1–1	Chesterfield	Gillingham
19:45 GMT	Dack (yellow card) 45+1'; Ehmer 67'; Donnelly (yellow card) 87'	Report	Anderson 90+4'	Stadium: Priestfield Stadium; Attendance: 4,595; Referee: Graham Horwood

18 February 2017 32	Chesterfield	1–2	Bury	Chesterfield
15:00 GMT	Gardner (yellow card) 23'; Dennis 32'; Kakay (yellow card) 60'; Anderson (red card) 78'	Report	Tutte 80'; Burgess (yellow card) 90'; Miller 90+2'	Stadium: Proact Stadium; Attendance: 5,582; Referee: Simon Hooper

21 February 2017 33	Millwall	0–0	Chesterfield	Bermondsey
19:45 GMT	Webster (yellow card) 33'	Report	Grimshaw (yellow card) 18'	Stadium: The Den; Attendance: 9,005; Referee: Lee Collins

25 February 2017 34	Chesterfield	0–4	Oxford United	Chesterfield
15:00 GMT		Report	Hall 19'; McAleny 35', 60', 69'	Stadium: Proact Stadium; Attendance: 5,901; Referee: David Webb

4 March 2017 35	Swindon Town	0–1	Chesterfield	Swindon
15:00 GMT		Report	Hird (yellow card) 74'; Jones (yellow card) 84'; Evans (yellow card) 90+2'; Mitchell 90+3'	Stadium: County Ground; Attendance: 6,691; Referee: Chris Sarginson

7 March 2017 36	Walsall	1–0	Chesterfield	Walsall
19:45 GMT	Laird 53'	Report	Grimshaw (yellow card) 81'	Stadium: Bescot Stadium; Attendance: 3,963; Referee: Robert Lewis

11 March 2017 37	Chesterfield	1–1	Shrewsbury Town	Chesterfield
15:00 GMT	Evatt 42'; Anderson (yellow card) 90+5'	Report	Roberts 3'; Nsiala (yellow card) 42'	Stadium: Proact Stadium; Attendance: 6,317; Referee: Andy Haines

14 March 2017 38	Chesterfield	3–3	Peterborough United	Chesterfield
19:45 GMT	Ebanks-Blake 4'; Dennis 27'; Donohue (yellow card) 32' (goal) 54'; Nolan (yellow card) 64'; Kakay (yellow card) 81'	Report	Mackail-Smith 7', 30'; Nichols 17'	Stadium: Proact Stadium; Attendance: 5,048; Referee: Seb Stockbridge

18 March 2017 39	Bristol Rovers	2–1	Chesterfield	Bristol
15:00 GMT	Clarke 1'; Gaffney 18'; Sweeney (yellow card) 82'	Report	Dennis (yellow card) 20'; Nolan (yellow card) 67'; Dimaio (yellow card) 69'; Ebanks-Blake 85'	Stadium: Memorial Stadium; Attendance: 8,524; Referee: Darren Handley

25 March 2017 40	Chesterfield	1–3	Rochdale	Chesterfield
15:00 GMT	Dennis 51'; Donohue (yellow card) 60'; Anderson (yellow card) 76'; Faupala (red card) 90+6'	Report	Henderson 16'; Camps 40'; Allen 42'	Stadium: Proact Stadium; Attendance: 5,927; Referee: Mark Brown

1 April 2017 41	Bolton Wanderers	0–0	Chesterfield	Bolton
15:00 BST		Report	Dimaio (yellow card) 37'; McGinn (yellow card) 50'; Nolan (yellow card) 76' (yellow-red card) 90+5'	Stadium: Macron Stadium; Attendance: 23,376; Referee: Eddie Ilderton

8 April 2017 42	Chesterfield	1–0	Port Vale	Chesterfield
15:00 BST	Rowley 54'	Report		Stadium: Proact Stadium; Attendance: 5,527; Referee: Richard Clark

14 April 2017 43	Chesterfield	0–4	Southend United	Chesterfield
15:00 BST	Anderson (yellow card) 20'; Gardner (yellow card) 28'; Donohue (red card) 45'	Report	Cox 15' (pen.), 67'; Atkinson (yellow card) 54'; Wordsworth 57'; Fortuné 71'	Stadium: Proact Stadium; Attendance: 5,529; Referee: Ross Joyce

17 April 2017 44	Scunthorpe United	3–1	Chesterfield	Scunthorpe
15:00 BST	McGinn 21' (o.g.); Toney 37', 73'; Wiseman (yellow card) 83'	Report	Anderson 90+2'	Stadium: Glanford Park; Attendance: 4,636; Referee: Darren Drysdale

22 April 2017 45	Chesterfield	1–2	Charlton Athletic	Chesterfield
15:00 BST	Mitchell 90+1'; Dennis (yellow card) 90+2'; Nolan (yellow card) 90+5'	Report	Aribo (yellow card) 17'; Forster-Caskey 37'; Holmes 57'; Konsa (yellow card) 84'	Stadium: Proact Stadium; Attendance: 5,657; Referee: Michael Salisbury

30 April 2017 46	Sheffield United	3–2	Chesterfield	Sheffield
12:00 BST	Freeman 18' (yellow card) 20'; Moore (yellow card) 45'; Sharp 59' (yellow card) 67'; Lafferty 82'; Fleck (yellow card) 90+2'	Report	Mitchell (yellow card) 9'; Dennis 45' (pen.); McGinn 65'; Gardner (red card) 66'	Stadium: Bramall Lane; Attendance: 31,003; Referee: John Busby

=== FA Cup ===
5 November 2016 First round	Colchester United	1–2	Chesterfield	Colchester
15:00 GMT	Fosu 46'; Guthrie (yellow card) 75'	Report	O'Shea 23'; Evans 50'	Stadium: Weston Homes Community Stadium; Attendance: 1,840; Referee: Lee Probert

3 December 2016 Second round	Chesterfield	0–5	Wycombe Wanderers	Chesterfield
15:00 GMT	Nolan (red card) 64'	Report	Hayes 21'; Kashket 24', 70', 77'; Gape (yellow card) 40'; Akinfenwa (yellow card) 68'; Stewart 74'	Stadium: Proact Stadium; Attendance: 3,685; Referee: Michael Salisbury

=== EFL Cup ===
9 August 2016 First round	Rochdale	3–1	Chesterfield	Rochdale
19:45 BST	Henderson 47'; Cannon 53'; Mendez-Laing 78'	Report	McGinn 30'	Stadium: Spotland Stadium; Attendance: 1,436; Referee: Nigel Miller

=== EFL Trophy ===
Pos	Div	Team	Pld	W	PW	PL	L	GF	GA	GD	Pts	Qualification
1	ACA	Wolverhampton Wanderers U21	3	2	0	0	1	8	4	+4	6	Advance to Round 2
2	L1	Chesterfield	3	2	0	0	1	5	5	0	6	Advance to Round 2
3	L2	Crewe Alexandra	3	1	0	0	2	5	5	0	3	
4	L2	Accrington Stanley	3	1	0	0	2	4	8	−4	3	

Source: Sky Sports

30 August 2016 Group stage 1	Chesterfield	2–1	Wolverhampton Wanderers U23	Chesterfield
19:45 BST	Ebanks-Blake 24'; Donohue (yellow card) 45+2'; Dennis 76'		Ebanks-Landell (red card) 29'; Herc 74'; Johnson (yellow card) 90+2'	Stadium: Proact Stadium; Attendance: 950

4 October 2016 Group stage 2	Chesterfield	1–4	Accrington Stanley	Chesterfield
19:45 BST	Dennis 61'; Liddle (yellow card) 82'	Report	Taylor-Fletcher 14'; Gornell 21', 66'; Clark 42'; Hewitt (yellow card) 65'	Stadium: Proact Stadium; Attendance: 976

8 November 2016 Group stage 3	Crewe Alexandra	0–2	Chesterfield	Crewe
19:30 GMT	Perry Ng (yellow card) 22'	Report	O'Shea 22'; Mitchell (yellow card) 35'; Ofoegbu (yellow card) 65'; Ariyibi (yellow card) 72'; Dimaio 81' (pen.)	Stadium: Gresty Road; Attendance: 929; Referee: Roger East

6 December 2016 Second round	Rochdale	0–2	Chesterfield	Rochdale
19:30 GMT	McNulty (yellow card) 20' (yellow-red card) 47'; McDermott (yellow card) 72'	Report	Maguire 24'; Donohue (yellow card) 29'; Evans (yellow card) 48' (goal) 59'; Anderson (red card) 66'; Evatt (yellow card) 75'	Stadium: Spotland Stadium; Referee: Graham Salisbury

10 January 2017 Third round	Luton Town	4–0	Chesterfield	Luton
19:45 GMT	Mackail-Smith 23' (pen.); Marriott 25', 51'; Vassell 86'	Report	Evatt (yellow card) 22'	Stadium: Kenilworth Road Stadium; Attendance: 1,655; Referee: Charles Breakspear

== Statistics ==
=== Appearances ===
- Italics indicate loan player
- Asterisk indicates player left club mid-season

No.	Pos	Nat	Player	Total		League One		FA Cup		EFL Cup		EFL Trophy	
No.	Pos	Nat	Player	Apps	Goals	Apps	Goals	Apps	Goals	Apps	Goals	Apps	Goals
1	GK	(England) ENG	Tommy Lee	0	0	0	0	0	0	0	0	0	0
2	DF	(Scotland) SCO	Paul McGinn	19	2	17+1	1	0	0	1	1	0	0
3	DF	(England) ENG	Daniel Jones	12	0	10+2	0	0	0	0	0	0	0
4	DF	(England) ENG	Sam Hird	37	1	35	1	0	0	1	0	1	0
5	MF	(England) ENG	Gary Liddle*	31	1	26	1	2	0	1	0	2	0
6	DF	(England) ENG	Ian Evatt	39	2	30+1	2	2	0	1	0	4+1	0
7	MF	(England) ENG	Dan Gardner	38	2	22+12	2	0	0	0	0	4	0
8	MF	(Spain) ESP	Ángel	9	0	5+4	0	0	0	0	0	0	0
9	FW	(Wales) WAL	Ched Evans	29	7	20+5	5	1+1	1	1	0	1	1
10	FW	(England) ENG	Sylvan Ebanks-Blake	14	3	9+4	2	0	0	0	0	1	1
11	MF	(England) ENG	Reece Mitchell	32	2	18+11	2	1	0	0	0	1+1	0
12	GK	(Scotland) SCO	Ryan Fulton	29	0	26	0	2	0	1	0	0	0
15	MF	(England) ENG	Liam O'Neil*	20	2	17	2	2	0	0	0	1	0
15	FW	(France) FRA	David Faupala	14	1	7+7	1	0	0	0	0	0	0
16	DF	(England) ENG	Charlie Raglan	3	0	1	0	0	0	0+1	0	1	0
17	MF	(Republic of Ireland) IRL	Connor Dimaio	29	1	17+6	0	1	0	1	0	4	1
18	MF	(England) ENG	Jon Nolan	37	1	28+2	1	1+1	0	0	0	4+1	0
19	MF	(Wales) WAL	Dion Donohue	42	1	36+1	1	2	0	1	0	2	0
20	FW	(England) ENG	Kristian Dennis	43	10	27+9	8	1+1	0	0	0	1+4	2
21	GK	(England) ENG	Lloyd Allinson	10	0	5	0	0	0	0	0	5	0
22	FW	(Bermuda) BER	Rai Simons	25	0	6+14	0	0	0	0+1	0	4	0
23	DF	(England) ENG	Tom Anderson	39	2	33+1	2	2	0	0	0	3	0
24	FW	(Republic of Ireland) IRL	Conor Wilkinson*	12	4	6+6	4	0	0	0	0	0	0
24	DF	(England) ENG	Osman Kakay	8	0	7+1	0	0	0	0	0	0	0
25	DF	(England) ENG	Ritchie Humphreys	4	0	0+2	0	0	0	0	0	1+1	0
26	MF	(Republic of Ireland) IRL	Jay O'Shea	33	8	23+4	6	2	1	1	0	3	1
27	DF	(England) ENG	Laurence Maguire	16	1	10+1	0	0	0	0	0	4+1	1
28	MF	(United States) USA	Gboly Ariyibi*	36	0	24+4	0	2	0	1	0	4+1	0
28	MF	(England) ENG	Liam Grimshaw	13	0	10+3	0	0	0	0	0	0	0
29	FW	(England) ENG	Jake Beesley	10	0	4+3	0	1	0	0	0	2	0
30	FW	(England) ENG	Curtis Morrison	2	0	0+1	0	0	0	0+1	0	0	0
31	DF	(Republic of Ireland) IRL	Derek Daly*	2	0	0+1	0	0	0	0	0	0+1	0
32	DF	(Libya) LBA	Sadiq El Fitouri	2	0	2	0	0	0	0	0	0	0
33	DF	(New Zealand) NZL	Liam Graham	6	0	4	0	0+1	0	0	0	1	0
34	DF	(England) ENG	Ify Ofoegbu	2	0	0	0	0	0	0	0	1+1	0
35	FW	(England) ENG	Ricky German	9	0	1+6	0	0	0	0	0	0+2	0
36	GK	(England) ENG	Dylan Parkin	0	0	0	0	0	0	0	0	0	0
37	MF	(England) ENG	Reece Brown*	2	0	0+2	0	0	0	0	0	0	0
38	GK	(Germany) GER	Thorsten Stuckmann	15	0	15	0	0	0	0	0	0	0
39	MF	(England) ENG	Joe Rowley	7	1	7	1	0	0	0	0	0	0
40	GK	(England) ENG	Matt Duke	0	0	0	0	0	0	0	0	0	0
41	MF	(England) ENG	Jack Brownell	1	0	0+1	0	0	0	0	0	0	0
42	MF	(England) ENG	Charlie Wakefield	1	0	0+1	0	0	0	0	0	0	0

=== Goalscorers ===
Rnk	No	Pos	Nat	Name	League One	FA Cup	EFL Cup	EFL Trophy	Total
1	20	FW	(England)	Kristian Dennis	8	0	0	2	10
2	26	MF	(Republic of Ireland)	Jay O'Shea	6	1	0	1	8
3	9	FW	(Wales)	Ched Evans	5	1	0	1	7
4	24	FW	(Republic of Ireland)	Conor Wilkinson	4	0	0	0	4
5	10	FW	(England)	Sylvan Ebanks-Blake	2	0	0	1	3
6	15	MF	(England)	Liam O'Neil	2	0	0	0	2
=	7	MF	(England)	Dan Gardner	2	0	0	0	2
=	6	DF	(England)	Ian Evatt	2	0	0	0	2
=	23	DF	(England)	Tom Anderson	2	0	0	0	2
=	11	MF	(England)	Reece Mitchell	2	0	0	0	2
=	2	DF	(Scotland)	Paul McGinn	1	0	1	0	2
12	5	MF	(England)	Gary Liddle	1	0	0	0	1
=	4	DF	(England)	Sam Hird	1	0	0	0	1
=	18	MF	(England)	Jon Nolan	1	0	0	0	1
=	15	FW	(France)	David Faupala	1	0	0	0	1
=	19	MF	(Wales)	Dion Donohue	1	0	0	0	1
=	39	MF	(England)	Joe Rowley	1	0	0	0	1
=	17	MF	(Republic of Ireland)	Connor Dimaio	0	0	0	1	1
=	27	DF	(England)	Laurence Maguire	0	0	0	1	1
Own goals					1	0	0	0	1
Total					43	2	1	7	53
