= Reece Mitchell =

English footballer

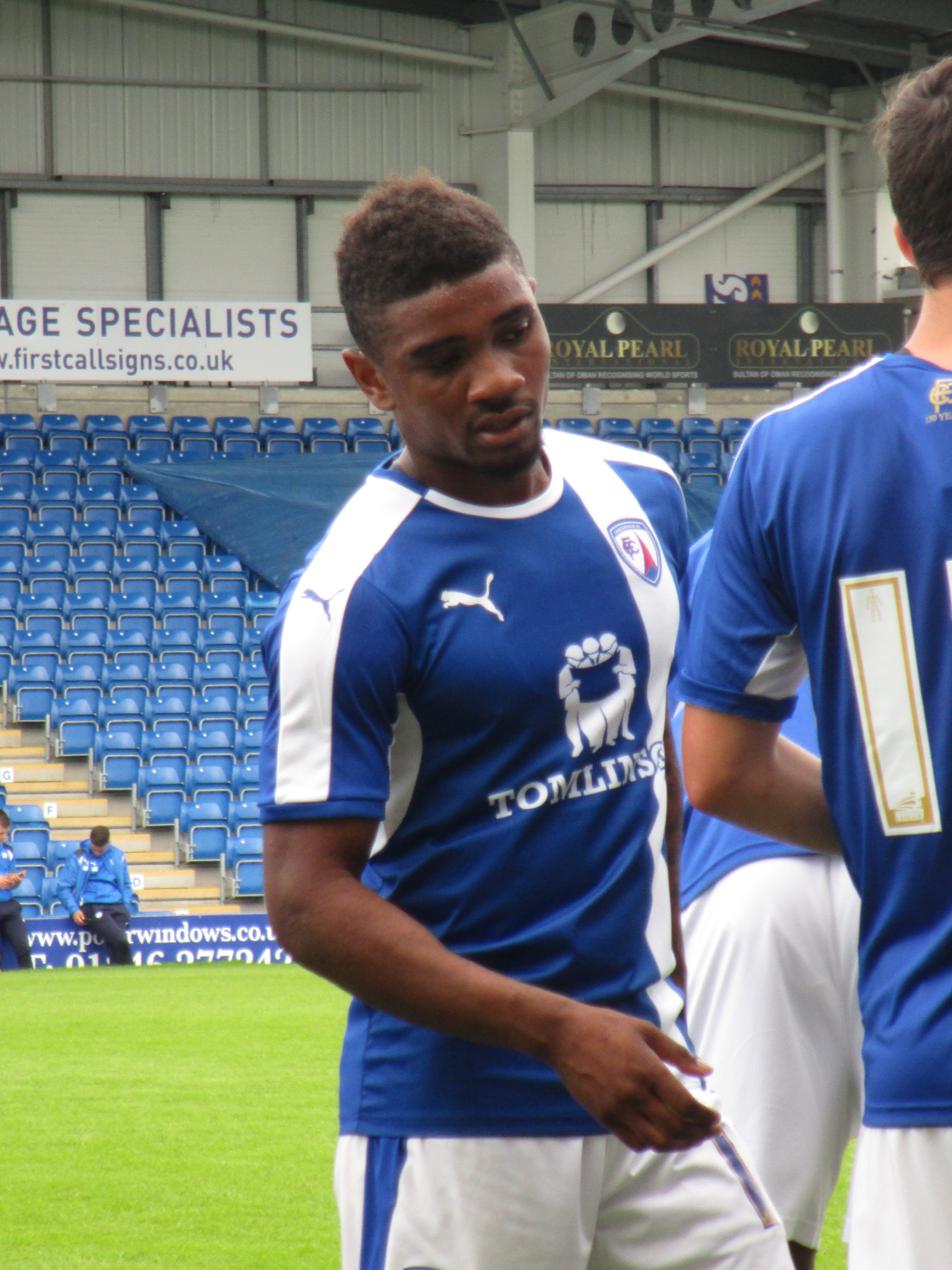
- Mitchell playing for Chesterfield in July 2016

Personal information
- Full name: Reece Steven Antoniye Mitchell
- Date of birth: 19 September 1995 (age 31)
- Place of birth: Westminster, England
- Height: 5 ft 9 in (1.75 m)
- Position: Winger

Team information
- Current team: Egham Town

Youth career
- 2005–2016: Chelsea

Senior career*
Years	Team	Apps	(Gls)
2016–2018	Chesterfield	32	(2)
2018	Torquay United	2	(0)
2018–2019	Wealdstone	10	(0)
2018	→ Hendon (loan)	2	(0)
2018	→ Wingate & Finchley (loan)	6	(1)
2019	Farnborough	4	(0)
2019	Haringey Borough	0	(0)
2019–2020	Hendon	8	(1)
2020–2021	KVK Westhoek		
2021	Bracknell Town	3	(0)
2022	Víkingur Ólafsvík	19	(4)
2023–2024	Harrow Borough	35	(16)
2024–	Egham Town	0	(0)

International career
2010	England U16	1	(0)
- * Club domestic league appearances and goals as of 14:47, 23 June 2024 (UTC)

Reece Steven Antoniye Mitchell (born 19 September 1995) is an English footballer who plays as a winger for Egham Town.

== Club career ==
Mitchell joined Chelsea's academy in 2005 as an under-11 and went on to make his under-18 debut as a 15-year old. He went on to play for the club's development squad between 2014 and 2016.

On 29 June 2016, Mitchell rejected a new deal with Chelsea, in order to join League One side Chesterfield on a two-year deal. On 9 August 2016, Mitchell made his professional debut in a 3–1 defeat in an EFL Cup tie against Rochdale, playing 64 minutes before being replaced by Curtis Morrison. Four days later, Mitchell went on to make his Football League debut in a 3–1 victory over Swindon Town, replacing Jay O'Shea with eight minutes remaining. He scored his first senior goal against the same club on 4 March 2017 in a 1–0 victory for the Spireites. He left the club by mutual consent in January 2018.

On 10 January 2018, Mitchell signed for National League club Torquay United. He went onto appear just twice for Torquay, before leaving at the end of his contract in June 2018.

He was released by Torquay at the end of the 2017–18 season.

In the summer of 2018, Mitchell joined National League South side Wealdstone and later had loan spells with Hendon and Wingate & Finchley. He finished the season with Farnborough before joining Haringey Borough and later rejoining Hendon in October 2018 on dual registration.

In January 2020, Mitchell joined Belgian Second Amateur Division side KVK Westhoek.

In October 2021, Mitchell joined Isthmian League South Central Division side Bracknell Town.

In January 2022, Mitchell headed abroad again, this time to Iceland to join newly relegated 2. deild karla side Víkingur Ólafsvík. He left the club at the end of 2022. In the summer 2023, he returned to England, joining Harrow Borough. In May 2024, he signed with Egham Town.

== Career statistics ==
As of match played 20 January 2017.

Appearances and goals by club, season and competition
Club	Season	League			FA Cup		League Cup		Other		Total	
Club	Season	Division	Apps	Goals	Apps	Goals	Apps	Goals	Apps	Goals	Apps	Goals
Chesterfield	2016–17	League One	28	2	1	0	1	0	3 (Note: Appearance(s) in the EFL Trophy)	0	33	2
Chesterfield	2017–18	League Two	4	0	1	0	1	0	1	0	7	0
Chesterfield	Total		32	2	2	0	2	0	4	0	40	2
Torquay United	2017–18	National League	2	0	0	0	—		0	0	2	0
Career total			34	2	2	0	2	0	4	0	42	2
