= Ify Ofoegbu =

Nigerian footballer

Personal information
- Full name: Ifeanyi Convenant Ofoegbu
- Date of birth: 5 January 2000 (age 26)
- Place of birth: Nigeria
- Positions: Defender; midfielder; forward

Team information
- Current team: Ossett United

Youth career
- –2016: Huddersfield Town
- 2016–2018: Chesterfield

Senior career*
Years	Team	Apps	(Gls)
2016–2019	Chesterfield	2	(0)
2018	→ Sheffield (loan)		
2020	Wakefield		
2020–2021	Tadcaster Albion	7	(1)
2021	Worksop Town	3	(0)
2021	Grantham Town	2	(0)
2021–	Ossett United	17	(5)
- * Club domestic league appearances and goals as of 21:15, 28 April 2022 (UTC)

Ifeanyi Convenant Ofoegbu (born 5 January 2000) is a footballer for Northern Premier League side Ossett United.

== Career ==
Ofoegbu joined Chesterfield from Huddersfield Town in 2016. He made his senior debut at the age of 16 in a 4–1 defeat by Accrington Stanley in an EFL Trophy group stage match at the Proact Stadium on 4 October 2016. In doing so he became the club's fifth youngest-ever player. Ofoegbu was offered his first professional contract in May 2018, and was released a year later, having made 5 senior appearances for the club.

On 19 June 2020, he signed for Northern Premier League Division One North West side Tadcaster Albion, where he linked up with assistant manager, Steve Waide, who had coached him at Huddersfield Town's Academy.

On 2 July 2021, he signed for Northern Premier League Division One East side Worksop Town, but he only went on to make four appearances for The Tigers.

In November 2021, he signed for Grantham Town.

In December 2021, he signed for Northern Premier League East Division side Ossett United and scored on his debut against Brighouse Town.

== Statistics ==
As of match played 23 April 2022

Appearances and goals by club, season and competition
Club	Season	Division	League		FA Cup		EFL Cup		Other		Total	
Club	Season	Division	Apps	Goals	Apps	Goals	Apps	Goals	Apps	Goals	Apps	Goals
Chesterfield	2016–17	League One	0	0	0	0	0	0	2 (Note: Appearance/s in the EFL Trophy.)	0	2	0
Chesterfield	2017–18	League Two	0	0	0	0	0	0	0	0	0	0
Chesterfield	2018–19	National League	2	0	0	—		0	1 (Note: Appearance/s in the FA Trophy.)	0	3	0
Chesterfield	Total		2	0	0	0	—		3	0	5	0
Tadcaster Albion	2020–21	NPL Division One North-West	7	1	3	4	—		0	0	10	5
Worksop Town	2021–22	NPL Division One East	3	0	1	0	—		0	0	4	0
Grantham Town	2021–22	NPL Premier Division	2	0	0	0	—		0	0	2	0
Ossett United	2021–22	NPL Division One East	17	5	—		—		—		17	5
Career total			33	6	4	4	0	0	3	0	40	10
