= Liam Graham (footballer) =

New Zealand footballer (born 1992)

Personal information
- Full name: Liam Matthew Graham
- Date of birth: 14 August 1992 (age 34)
- Place of birth: Melbourne, Australia
- Height: 1.78 m (5 ft 10 in)
- Position: Right back

Youth career
- 2010–2012: Vicenza

Senior career*
Years	Team	Apps	(Gls)
2012–2013	Ascoli	1	(0)
2014–2015	Monza	0	(0)
2014–2015	→ Pro Patria (loan)	5	(0)
2015–2017	Chesterfield	4	(0)
2016	→Whitehawk (loan)	15	(0)
2017	Auckland City	4	(0)

International career^{‡}
2011	New Zealand U20	1	(0)
2016–	New Zealand	4	(0)
- * Club domestic league appearances and goals as of 09:36, 9 April 2018 (UTC) ‡ National team caps and goals as of 8 October 2016

Liam Matthew Graham (born 14 August 1992) is a New Zealand professional footballer who plays for Auckland City and the New Zealand national team.

Graham was born in Melbourne, Australia. He played youth football with Vicenza before making his professional debut with Ascoli in 2013. In 2014, Graham signed with Monza and subsequently played for Pro Patria on loan.

== Early life ==
Graham was born in Melbourne, Australia, but spent his youth moving throughout Australia, Singapore, New Zealand and Japan. He started playing football aged five.

== Club career ==
=== Vicenza ===
Graham signed for Serie B club Vicenza in 2010 after an eight-day trial with the side. He played two seasons for the side's youth team in the Campionato Nazionale Primavera.

=== Ascoli ===
On 10 August 2012, Graham signed a senior contract with Ascoli. He made his competitive debut for the side in a loss to Hellas Verona in the 2012–13 Serie B, coming on for Róbert Feczesin after 77 minutes.

Graham missed the 2013–14 season after tearing his anterior cruciate ligament at the beginning of the season and was left without a contract. After his recovery, he spent the final months of the season training with Savona.

=== Monza ===
In 2014, Graham signed with Monza before being loaned out to Pro Patria in the Lega Pro. Graham's debut came in September 2014, starting in a 2–0 loss to Südtirol.

=== Chesterfield ===
In October 2015, Graham joined Football League One club Chesterfield. He joined National League South Whitehawk on loan in March 2016. Graham suffered another anterior cruciate ligament knee injury in November 2016, which kept him out for the remainder of the season.

=== Auckland City ===
Graham returned to New Zealand in September 2017, signing with Auckland City.

== International career ==
In April 2011, Graham was called up to the New Zealand U-20 squad for the 2011 OFC U-20 Championship. He made his debut off the bench in a group stage win over Solomon Islands, coming on for Marco Rojas after 79 minutes. New Zealand won the tournament, beating Solomon Islands in the final and qualifying for the 2011 FIFA U-20 World Cup.

In September 2016, Graham received his first call-up to the New Zealand national team for a tour of North America. He made his debut in a 2–1 friendly loss to Mexico.

== Career statistics ==
As of match played 27 September 2016

Club	Season	Division	League		FA Cup		League Cup		Other		Total	
Club	Season	Division	Apps	Goals	Apps	Goals	Apps	Goals	Apps	Goals	Apps	Goals
Ascoli	2012–13	Serie B	1	0	-	-	-	-	0	0	1	0
Monza	2014–15	Lega Pro	0	0	-	-	-	-	0	0	0	0
Pro Patria (loan)	2014–15	Lega Pro	5	0	-	-	-	-	0	0	5	0
Chesterfield	2015–16	League One	0	0	0	0	0	0	0	0	0	0
Chesterfield	2016–17	League One	5	0	1	0	0	0	1	0	7	0
Whitehawk (loan)	2015–16	National League South	15	0	0	0	0	0	0	0	15	0
Career total			26	0	1	0	0	0	1	0	28	0

== Honours ==
=== International ===
New Zealand national football team

- OFC U-20 Championship: 2011

== See also ==
- List of foreign Serie B players
