= Connor Dimaio =

Footballer (born 1996)

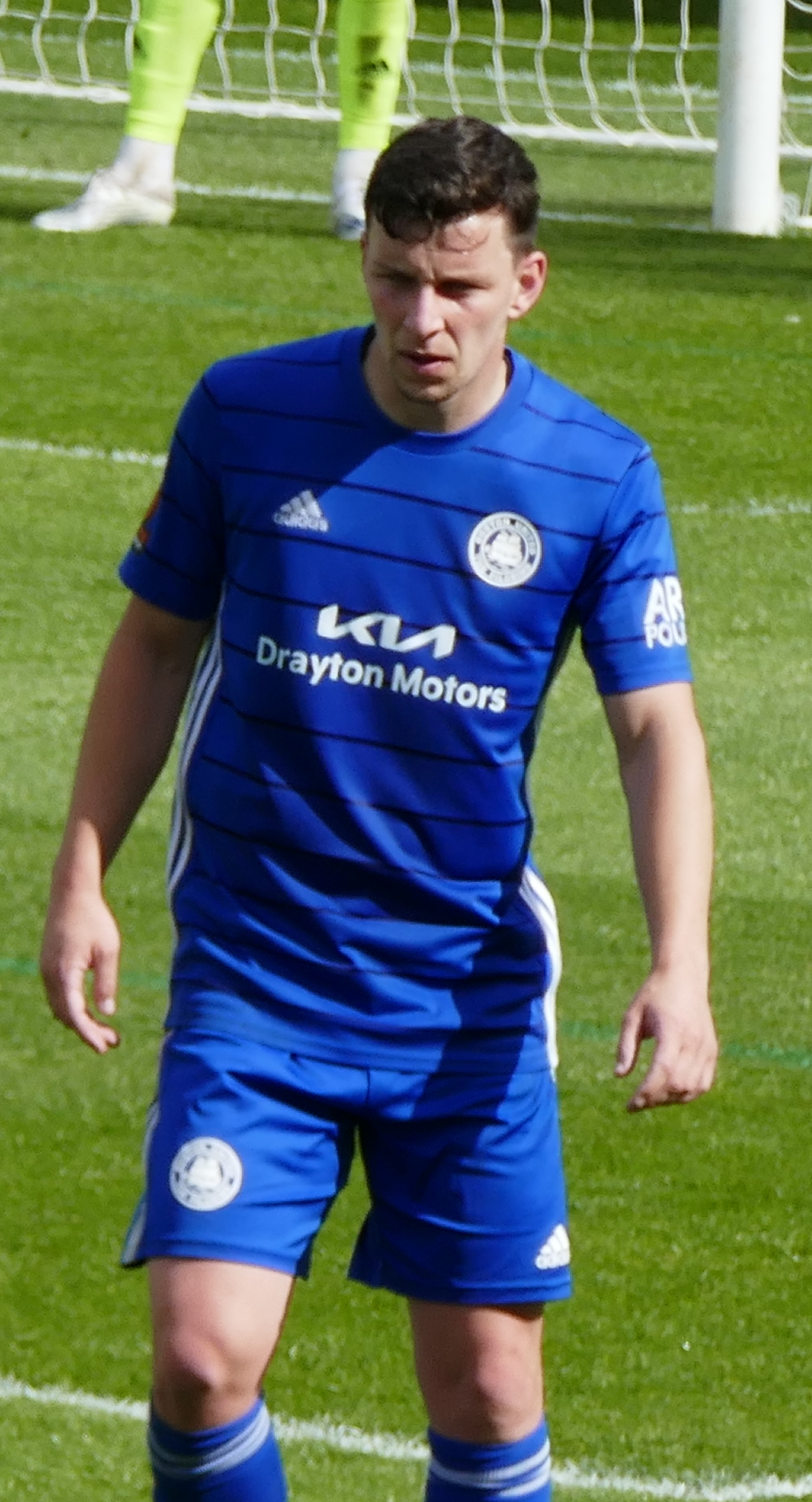
- Dimaio playing for Boston United in 2022

Personal information
- Full name: Connor James Dimaio
- Date of birth: 28 January 1996 (age 30)
- Place of birth: Chesterfield, England
- Height: 1.78 m (5 ft 10 in)
- Position: Midfielder

Team information
- Current team: Basford United

Youth career
- –2014: Sheffield United

Senior career*
Years	Team	Apps	(Gls)
2014–2016	Sheffield United	3	(0)
2016–2018	Chesterfield	44	(1)
2018–2020	Stockport County	35	(3)
2019	→ Ashton United (loan)	12	(0)
2019–2020	→ Curzon Ashton (loan)	10	(2)
2020–2022	Boston United	23	(0)
2022	→ Curzon Ashton (loan)	15	(1)
2022–2023	Curzon Ashton	18	(0)
2023–2024	Matlock Town	15	(1)
2024	→ Rainworth Miners Welfare (loan)	5	(0)
2024	Bradford (Park Avenue)	5	(0)
2024	Matlock Town	3	(0)
2024–2025	Bradford (Park Avenue)	28	(0)
2025–	Basford United	0	(0)

International career
2012	Republic of Ireland U16	1	(1)
2013	Republic of Ireland U17	2	(0)
2013–2016	Republic of Ireland U19	8	(0)
2016–2017	Republic of Ireland U21	4	(0)
- * Club domestic league appearances and goals as of 16:02, 21 May 2025 (UTC)

Connor James Dimaio (born 28 January 1996) is a professional footballer who plays as a midfielder for Eastwood FC. Born in England, he has represented the Republic of Ireland at the under-21 level.

== Club career ==
=== Sheffield United ===
A product of United's Academy, Dimaio made his first team début in March 2014 in an away game at Crawley Town. Dimaio made two further appearances for the Blades before the end of the season, which was enough to see him awarded the club's annual 'Young Player of the Year' award.

=== Chesterfield ===
Dimaio signed for League One side Chesterfield on 1 February 2016, on a contract until the end of the season, having been released by Sheffield United on the same day as he signed for Chesterfield. He scored his first goal for Chesterfield in a 3–1 win against Crewe Alexandra on 20 February 2016.

=== Stockport County ===
In May 2018, Dimaio signed a two-year deal with Stockport County. In February 2019 he joined Ashton United on loan until the end of the season.

After leaving Stockport, Diamio joined National League North side Boston United in August 2020. On 25 February 2022, he signed for National League side Curzon Ashton, returning to the club until the end of the season.

=== Curzon Ashton ===
In July 2022, he signed permanently for National League North side Curzon Ashton.

=== Matlock Town ===
On 9 February 2023, Dimaio signed for Northern Premier League Premier Division club Matlock Town. On 4 March 2023, he went down injured during a 1–1 draw with Ashton United, a scan revealing that he had suffered a damaged cruciate ligament that would keep him out of action for between ten and twelve months. A crowdfunding campaign was set up to pay for career-saving surgery, receiving a £1000 donation from former Sheffield United youth teammate and Premier League goalkeeper Aaron Ramsdale. On 5 January 2024 Dimaio was loaned to United Counties League First Division Rainworth Miners Welfare for a month as part of his injury rehabilitation.

=== Bradford (Park Avenue) ===
In May 2024, Dimaio joined Northern Premier League Division One East club Bradford (Park Avenue) following their relegation.

=== Return to Matlock Town ===
On 16 September 2024, Dimaio returned to Matlock Town. Having made three appearances, he departed the club the following month in search for more playing time.

=== Return to Bradford (Park Avenue) ===
On 14 October 2024, Dimaio returned to Bradford (Park Avenue), one month after he had initially departed the club.

=== Basford United ===
In May 2025, Dimaio joined Basford United.

== International career ==
Having represented the Republic of Ireland at under-16 and under-17 level, Dimaio was called up to the Republic of Ireland under-19 side in August 2013. He made his debut in a friendly fixture against Norway later that month. In mid May 2014, Dimaio started in two friendly defeats for Ireland Under-19s, both against Mexico Under-20s.

Dimaio was called up for the under-21 team in March 2016 and made his debut in a European qualifier against Slovenia.

== Career statistics ==
As of end of 2024–25 season

Appearances and goals by club, season and competition
Club	Season	League			FA Cup		League Cup		Other		Total	
Club	Season	Division	Apps	Goals	Apps	Goals	Apps	Goals	Apps	Goals	Apps	Goals
Sheffield United	2013–14	League One	3	0	0	0	0	0	0	0	3	0
Sheffield United	2014–15	League One	0	0	1	0	0	0	0	0	1	0
Sheffield United	2015–16	League One	0	0	0	0	1	0	0	0	1	0
Sheffield United	Total		3	0	1	0	1	0	0	0	5	0
Chesterfield	2015–16	League One	11	1	—		—		—		11	1
Chesterfield	2016–17	League One	23	0	1	0	1	0	4 (Note: Appearance(s) in EFL Trophy)	1	29	1
Chesterfield	2017–18	League Two	10	0	1	0	0	0	3	0	14	0
Chesterfield	Total		44	1	2	0	1	0	7	1	54	2
Stockport County	2018–19	National League North	17	3	4	0	—		0	0	21	3
Stockport County	2019–20	National League	18	0	0	0	—		—		18	0
Stockport County	Total		35	3	4	0	—		0	0	39	3
Ashton United (loan)	2018–19	National League North	12	0	—		—		—		12	0
Curzon Ashton (loan)	2019–20	National League North	10	2	—		—		1 (Note: Appearance(s) in FA Trophy)	1	11	3
Boston United	2020–21	National League North	11	0	1	0	—		3	1	15	1
Boston United	2021–22	National League North	12	0	1	0	—		4 (Note: Two appearances in National League North play-offs; one appearance in FA Trophy; one appearance in Lincolnshire Senior Cup)	0	17	0
Boston United	Total		23	0	2	0	—		7	1	32	1
Curzon Ashton (loan)	2021–22	National League North	15	1	—		—		—		15	1
Curzon Ashton	2022–23	National League North	18	0	5	0	—		1	0	24	0
Curzon Ashton	Total		33	1	5	0	—		1	0	39	1
Matlock Town	2022–23	Northern Premier League Premier Division	6	1	0	0	—		0	0	6	1
Matlock Town	2023–24	Northern Premier League Premier Division	9	0	0	0	—		0	0	9	0
Matlock Town	Total		15	1	0	0	—		0	0	15	1
Rainworth Miners Welfare (loan)	2023–24	United Counties League Division One	5	0	—		—		0	0	5	0
Bradford (Park Avenue)	2024–25	Northern Premier League Division One East	5	0	1	0	—		1	0	7	0
Matlock Town	2024–25	Northern Premier League Premier Division	3	0	0	0	—		0	0	3	0
Bradford (Park Avenue)	2024–25	Northern Premier League Division One East	28	0	0	0	—		0	0	28	0
Career total			216	8	15	0	2	0	17	3	250	11
