= Sadiq El Fitouri =

Libyan professional footballer (born 1994)

Personal information
- Full name: Sadiq El Fitouri
- Date of birth: 10 October 1994 (age 32)
- Place of birth: Benghazi, Libya
- Height: 1.80 m (5 ft 11 in)
- Position: Defender

Youth career
- 2010–2013: Manchester City

Senior career*
Years	Team	Apps	(Gls)
2014–2015	Salford City	1	(0)
2015–2017	Manchester United	0	(0)
2017	Chesterfield	2	(0)
2017	Al Ahli Tripoli	14	(2)
2018	Politehnica Iași	0	(0)
2019	Al-Hilal Omdurman	0	(0)
2022	Maine Road	1	(0)

International career^{‡}
2015–2016	Libya	6	(0)
- * Club domestic league appearances and goals as of 16 April 2018 ‡ National team caps and goals as of 5 February 2017

Sadiq El Fitouri (born 10 October 1994) is a Libyan professional footballer who plays as a defender who recently played for Maine Road. He has also been capped by the Libya national team.

He predominantly plays as a right-back, but he can also operate as a centre-back. He began his career in the Manchester City youth system, subsequently moving to Salford City, before joining Manchester United in January 2015. He had a short stint at Chesterfield in 2017 after being released by Manchester United before joining Al Ahli Tripoli in July 2017. He signed for Politehnica Iași in January 2018 where he remained for only two months due to injuries. He is now a Hyrox athlete.

== Early life ==
El Fitouri was born in Libya, and raised in Old Trafford, Greater Manchester, England. During his time studying at Stretford High School, he was a member of the school's trophy-winning football team, which also progressed to a national cup final. During a season in the school's under-14 team, El Fitouri's father once stopped him from playing due to declining grades, but he subsequently returned to playing football after his grades improved.

== Club career ==
=== Manchester City ===
After leaving school, El Fitouri and two friends joined Manchester City, but all three were subsequently released. El Fitouri spent around a year with the club's youth setup. He was described as a player that could cope physically, but was not the best in the other aspects of the game. He was deemed as a late developer and did not manage to break into the club's first-team squad during his time there.

=== Salford City ===
Following his release from Manchester City's youth system, El Fitouri participated only in recreational football, before joining Salford City after a successful trial in December 2014. On 3 January 2015, he made his first-team debut for the club, in a Division One North tie against Kendal Town that ended 2–1. His debut match would turn out to be his only appearance for the Northern Premier League club. Several weeks prior to the match, the club had sacked incumbent manager, Phil Power. Part-owners Phil Neville and Paul Scholes had stepped in as caretakers for the club during the period, and were impressed with El Fitouri during training and his performance in the match against Kendal Town, prompting the pair to recommend El Fitouri to their former club's under-21 manager, Warren Joyce.

=== Manchester United ===
Through the recommendations of Neville and Scholes, El Fitouri was offered a week-long trial at the Trafford Training Centre. His performance during the trial prompted the club to offer him a contract. On 30 January 2015, El Fitouri signed an 18-month contract with Manchester United, entering the club's under-21 team.

On 23 February 2015, El Fitouri made his debut for the Manchester United under-21 team, in a match against the Sunderland under-21 team, which ended 1–1. He made three more appearances for the team in the 2014–15 season of the Professional Development League, where the Manchester United under-21 team went on to be crowned champions for the season. He was named in the senior 25-man squad for the 2016–17 Premier League season.

=== Chesterfield ===
El Fitouri signed for League One club Chesterfield on 2 February 2017, after being released by Manchester United. He made his debut two days later on 4 February 2017 in a 1–0 home defeat to Oldham Athletic. El Fitouri started the next game on 11 February 2017 against Northampton Town, losing 3–1. After that game he was given several days off for personal reasons but failed to return to the club, despite Chesterfield attempting to contact the player. He was subsequently released by the club at the end of the season.

=== Al-Ahli Sports Club ===
After being released by Chesterfield, El Fitouri returned to the country of his birth and joined reigning Libyan Premier League champions Al-Ahli Tripoli on 29 July 2017.

=== Politehnica Iași ===
El Fitouri returned to Europe after signing for Romanian club Politehnica Iași on 30 January 2018. However injuries prevented him from playing and subsequently had his contract terminated on 28 March, only two months after joining, with Iași wishing him the best of luck.

=== Al-Hilal Omdurman ===
On 14 March 2019, El Fitouri signed for Sudanese club Al-Hilal Omdurman on a two-year deal.

=== Maine Road FC ===
On 6 February 2022, El Fitouri signed for North West Counties Football League Division One South club Maine Road.

== International career ==
On 6 June 2015, El Fitouri made his full international debut for Libya after being included in the starting line-up by national coach Javier Clemente for a friendly match against Mali. A week later, on 12 June 2015, El Fitouri made his first competitive appearance for Libya in a 2017 Africa Cup of Nations qualification match against Morocco. He played in his preferred right-back role for the full 90 minutes, with the match ending in a 1–0 defeat.

== Career statistics ==
=== Club ===
As of match played 11 February 2017

Appearances and goals by club, season and competition
Club	Season	League			Cup		League Cup		Europe		Other		Total	
Club	Season	Division	Apps	Goals	Apps	Goals	Apps	Goals	Apps	Goals	Apps	Goals	Apps	Goals
Salford City	2014–15	Division One North	1	0	0	0	–		–		0	0	1	0
Manchester United	2016–17	Premier League	0	0	0	0	0	0	0	0	0	0	0	0
Chesterfield	2016–17	League One	2	0	0	0	0	0	–		0	0	2	0
Al-Ahli Tripoli	2017–18	Premier League	0	0	0	0	0	0	–		0	0	0	0
Politehnica Iași	2017–18	Liga I	0	0	0	0	0	0	0	0	0	0	0	0
Al-Hilal Omdurman	2018–19	Sudan Premier League	0	0	0	0	0	0	0	0	0	0	0	0
Career total			3	0	0	0	0	0	0	0	0	0	3	0

=== International ===
As of match played 21 March 2020

Appearances and goals by national team and year
National team	Year	Apps	Goals
Libya	2015	5	0
Libya	2016	1	0
Total		6	0
