= Sylvan Ebanks-Blake =

English footballer (born 1986)

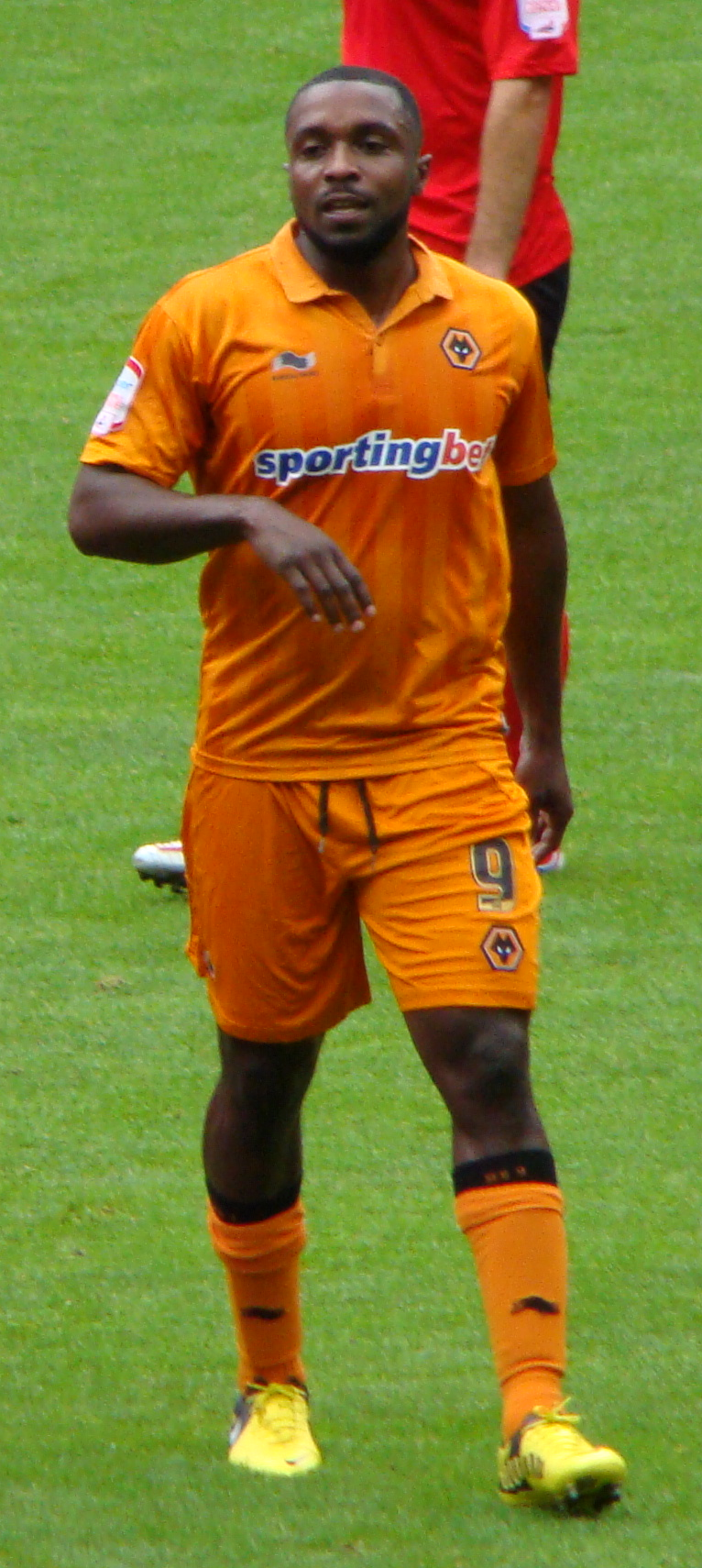
- Ebanks-Blake playing for Wolverhampton Wanderers in 2012

Personal information
- Full name: Sylvan Augustus Ebanks-Blake
- Date of birth: 29 March 1986 (age 40)
- Place of birth: Cambridge, England
- Height: 5 ft 8 in (1.73 m)
- Position: Striker

Youth career
- 1999–2002: Cambridge United
- 2002–2004: Manchester United

Senior career*
Years	Team	Apps	(Gls)
2004–2006	Manchester United	0	(0)
2006	→ Royal Antwerp (loan)	9	(4)
2006–2008	Plymouth Argyle	66	(21)
2008–2013	Wolverhampton Wanderers	177	(61)
2013–2014	Ipswich Town	9	(0)
2015	Preston North End	9	(1)
2015–2017	Chesterfield	46	(12)
2016–2017	→ Shrewsbury Town (loan)	7	(0)
2017–2018	A.F.C. Telford United	6	(2)
2018	Halesowen Town	7	(0)
2018	Barwell	5	(1)
2018–2019	Walsall Wood	5	(2)
Total		346	(104)

International career
2008	England U21	1	(0)
- * Club domestic league appearances and goals

Sylvan Augustus Ebanks-Blake (born 29 March 1986) is an English former professional footballer who played as a striker.

He played youth team football for Cambridge United and Manchester United before making his professional debut in 2004. A spell on loan with Royal Antwerp followed before Ebanks-Blake was transferred to Plymouth Argyle in 2006. During his two seasons with Argyle, he scored 21 goals in the Championship and then joined Wolverhampton Wanderers for £1.5 million, where he won the Championship top scorer award in consecutive seasons to help the club gain promotion to the Premier League.

Ebanks-Blake represented England at under-21 level, but was also eligible to play for Jamaica at senior international level through his parents.

== Career ==
=== Early career ===
Born in Cambridge, Cambridgeshire, Ebanks-Blake attended the Netherhall School and his first clubs were Cherry Hinton Lions and Fulbourn Falcons in the Cambridge area. At the age of 15, having been on schoolboy terms with Cambridge United, he attended a two-week trial with Manchester United at their training centre. He was offered a contract at the end of the trial and turned down a scholarship with Cambridge to join Manchester United's Academy. He played his first match at senior level for the club on 26 October 2004 against Crewe Alexandra in the League Cup. One year later, he scored his first senior level goal for the club against Barnet in another League Cup tie.

Towards the end of the 2004–05 season, he fractured his leg and was ruled out for the remainder of the season. He recovered and scored a hat-trick on his return for the Manchester United reserves. However, he was never called on for a first team league game again, although he was an unused substitute in several Champions League games. In January 2006, he moved on loan to Royal Antwerp in Belgium to gain first team experience.

=== Plymouth Argyle ===
Ebanks-Blake returned to England in the summer and signed a three-year deal with Championship club Plymouth Argyle on 14 July 2006. The fee paid to Manchester United was an initial £200,000, potentially rising to over £300,000 due to clauses. Ebanks-Blake was new manager Ian Holloway's first signing and became a first team regular.

The striker notched up 10 goals in his first season at Argyle, many of which came at the end of the season. He cemented his status as a fan favourite and top prospect with 11 league goals by New Year in the 2007–08 season, despite starting the season on the substitutes bench.

=== Wolverhampton Wanderers ===
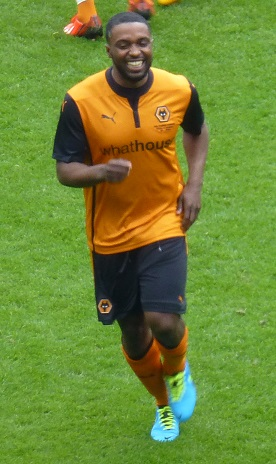
Ebanks-Blake during the Jody Craddock Testimonial in May 2014

His form attracted the attention from fellow Championship side Wolverhampton Wanderers, who activated a buy-out clause in his contract for £1.5 million, and he signed for them on 11 January 2008, on a four-and-a-half-year contract. He scored his first league goal for Wolves on 19 January 2008, against Scunthorpe United, and a run of seven goals in his first eight games won him the Championship Player of the Month Award for March 2008. The season ended with him winning the Championship Golden Boot for the 2007–08 season, scoring a total of 23 goals, 12 for Wolves and 11 for Plymouth Argyle.

Ebanks-Blake started the 2008–09 season in excellent form, scoring nine goals in the opening 13 league games, form which also earned him a cap for the England under-21 side, when he came on as a substitute against Czech Republic U21s on 18 November 2008. At the 2009 Football League Awards he was named Championship Player of the Year, and also received the Goal of the Year Award for his solo effort at Charlton Athletic in March 2008.

During the season he scored his first hat-trick of his professional career, against Norwich City on 3 February 2009 at Molineux, to once again reach the 20-goal mark. Having recovered from a calf injury, his final goal of the campaign came against Queens Park Rangers on 18 April 2009, which gave the team the 1–0 win that secured promotion to the Premier League. The striker finished this Championship-winning season with a tally of 25 goals, enough to retain the Championship Golden Boot for a second consecutive season. Wolves rewarded him with a new four-year deal in July 2009, which saw him stay at Molineux until the summer of 2013.

Ebanks-Blake struggled to repeat his goalscoring form at Premier League level. After struggling with injuries in early stages of the season, he returned but only managed to score one goal, from the penalty spot (against Aston Villa in October 2009). He was then dropped from the side as manager Mick McCarthy preferred to play the 4–5–1 formation, with Kevin Doyle playing the lone striker role. Later on in the season, Ebanks-Blake scored his second and final league goal in the campaign, heading in against Blackburn Rovers on 24 April 2009 to secure a 1–1 draw that effectively guaranteed Wolves their Premier League survival.

He had a brighter start to the 2010–11 Premier League season, scoring four league goals before Christmas: against Everton, Newcastle United, former club Manchester United and Sunderland. Although he was less favoured for a starting berth than Kevin Doyle or new signing Steven Fletcher, he ended the season with seven goals from 28 appearances as the club narrowly avoided relegation on the final day.

In August 2011, he suffered knee ligament damage that put him out of action for six weeks, but when he returned, he was unable to match his goalscoring tally of the previous season as the team struggled against relegation. He scored only one Premier League goal during the campaign (against Norwich) as the club returned to the Championship under the temporary management of Terry Connor.

The 2012–13 season saw Ebanks-Blake return to his goalscoring form and net 14 league goals, before a broken fibula and sprained ankle suffered against Birmingham City on 1 April 2013 ruled him out for the remainder of the season, as well as potentially the start of the following. He was released by the club at the end of the 2012–13 season, which saw Wolves relegated to League One.

=== Ipswich Town ===
Ebanks-Blake signed for Ipswich Town on 19 December 2013 a move which reunited him with his former manager Mick McCarthy. He was assigned the number 27 shirt having signed a contract until end of 2013–14 season. He made his debut for the club in the FA Cup third round tie against Preston North End on 4 January 2014, but was substituted off injured after 29 minutes.

=== Preston North End ===
After a trial period with Brentford in October 2014, Ebanks-Blake went on trial with a number of other Football League clubs before ending up at Preston North End in December 2014. He was signed by Preston on a short-term contract on 1 January 2015, keeping him at the club until the end of the 2014–15 season.

He was released in May 2015 following Preston's promotion to the Championship, making 13 appearances in all competitions, his only goal for the club came in the form of a 76th-minute equaliser against Yeovil Town.

=== Chesterfield ===
On 6 June 2015, Ebanks-Blake signed for Chesterfield after his release from Preston North End. Ebanks-Blake was released at the end of the 2016–17 season.

=== Shrewsbury Town (loan) ===
Ebanks-Blake joined Shrewsbury Town on a half-season loan on 31 August 2016. Making just seven first-team appearances without scoring during his loan period, which also saw a change in management at the club, new manager Paul Hurst opted not to extend this arrangement when it came to an end in January 2017.

=== A.F.C. Telford United ===
In October 2017, it was reported that as a free-agent, Ebanks-Blake was training with National League North side A.F.C. Telford United. He joined the club the following month, making his debut on 25 November in a 4–2 FA Trophy victory over Droylsden, scoring two goals.

Ebanks-Blake left Telford on 6 February 2018, as manager Rob Edwards wanted to balance the budget.

=== Halesowen Town ===
Ebanks-Blake joined Halesowen Town on 26 July 2018 to play alongside former West Bromwich Albion striker Lee Hughes. After a change in management at Halesowen he signed for league rivals Barwell in October 2018.

=== Walsall Wood ===
In December 2018, Ebanks-Blake joined Midland League side Walsall Wood. He scored two goals in five games in the 2018–19 Midland League Premier Division, prior to suffering a serious injury having broken his leg for the third time in his career.

== Personal life ==
In 2008 Ebanks-Blake was charged with causing actual bodily harm to a doorman in an incident at a Plymouth nightclub on 11 November 2007 while a Plymouth Argyle player. He was subsequently fined £1,350 with £650 costs and £500 compensation by Plymouth Crown Court on 4 July 2008, after admitting to having attacked the doorman with his girlfriend's handbag causing a three-inch cut to his head. In March 2013 he was arrested and questioned by police in Birmingham on suspicion of witness intimidation but released without charge.

== Career statistics ==
Appearances and goals by club, season and competition
Club	Season	League			FA Cup		League Cup		Other		Total	
Club	Season	Division	Apps	Goals	Apps	Goals	Apps	Goals	Apps	Goals	Apps	Goals
Manchester United	2004–05	Premier League	0	0	0	0	1	0	0	0	1	0
Manchester United	2005–06	Premier League	0	0	0	0	1	1	0	0	1	1
Manchester United	Total		0	0	0	0	2	1	0	0	2	1
Royal Antwerp (loan)	2005–06	Belgian Second Division	9	4	—		—		—		9	4
Plymouth Argyle	2006–07	Championship	41	10	3	0	1	0	0	0	45	10
Plymouth Argyle	2007–08	Championship	25	11	1	1	3	1	0	0	29	13
Plymouth Argyle	Total		66	21	4	1	4	1	0	0	74	23
Wolverhampton Wanderers	2007–08	Championship	20	12	0	0	0	0	0	0	20	12
Wolverhampton Wanderers	2008–09	Championship	41	25	2	0	1	0	0	0	44	25
Wolverhampton Wanderers	2009–10	Premier League	23	2	3	0	1	0	0	0	27	2
Wolverhampton Wanderers	2010–11	Premier League	30	7	1	0	3	0	0	0	34	7
Wolverhampton Wanderers	2011–12	Premier League	23	1	2	0	1	2	0	0	26	3
Wolverhampton Wanderers	2012–13	Championship	40	14	1	0	1	1	0	0	42	15
Wolverhampton Wanderers	Total		177	61	9	0	7	3	0	0	193	64
Ipswich Town	2013–14	Championship	9	0	1	0	0	0	0	0	10	0
Preston North End	2014–15	League One	9	1	2	0	0	0	2	0	13	1
Chesterfield	2015–16	League One	33	10	3	0	0	0	1	0	37	10
Chesterfield	2016–17	League One	13	2	0	0	0	0	1	1	14	3
Chesterfield	Total		46	12	3	0	0	0	2	1	51	13
Shrewsbury Town (loan)	2016–17	League One	7	0	0	0	0	0	0	0	7	0
Telford United	2017-18	National League North	6	2	0	0	-		2	2	8	4
Halesowen Town	2018-19	Southern League Premier Central	7	0	2	0	-		0	0	9	0
Barwell	2018-19	Southern League Premier Central	5	1	0	0	-		4	1	9	2
Walsall Wood	2018–19	Midland League Premier Division	5	2	0	0	-		0	0	5	2
Career total			346	104	21	1	13	5	10	4	390	114

== Honours ==
Wolverhampton Wanderers

- Football League Championship: 2008–09

Individual

- Denzil Haroun Reserve Team Player of the Year: 2004–05
- Football League Championship Player of the Month: March 2008
- Football League Championship Golden Boot: 2007–08, 2008–09
- PFA Team of the Year: 2008–09 Championship
- Football League Championship Player of the Year: 2008–09
- Football League Goal of the Year: 2008–09
