= Curtis Morrison =

English footballer

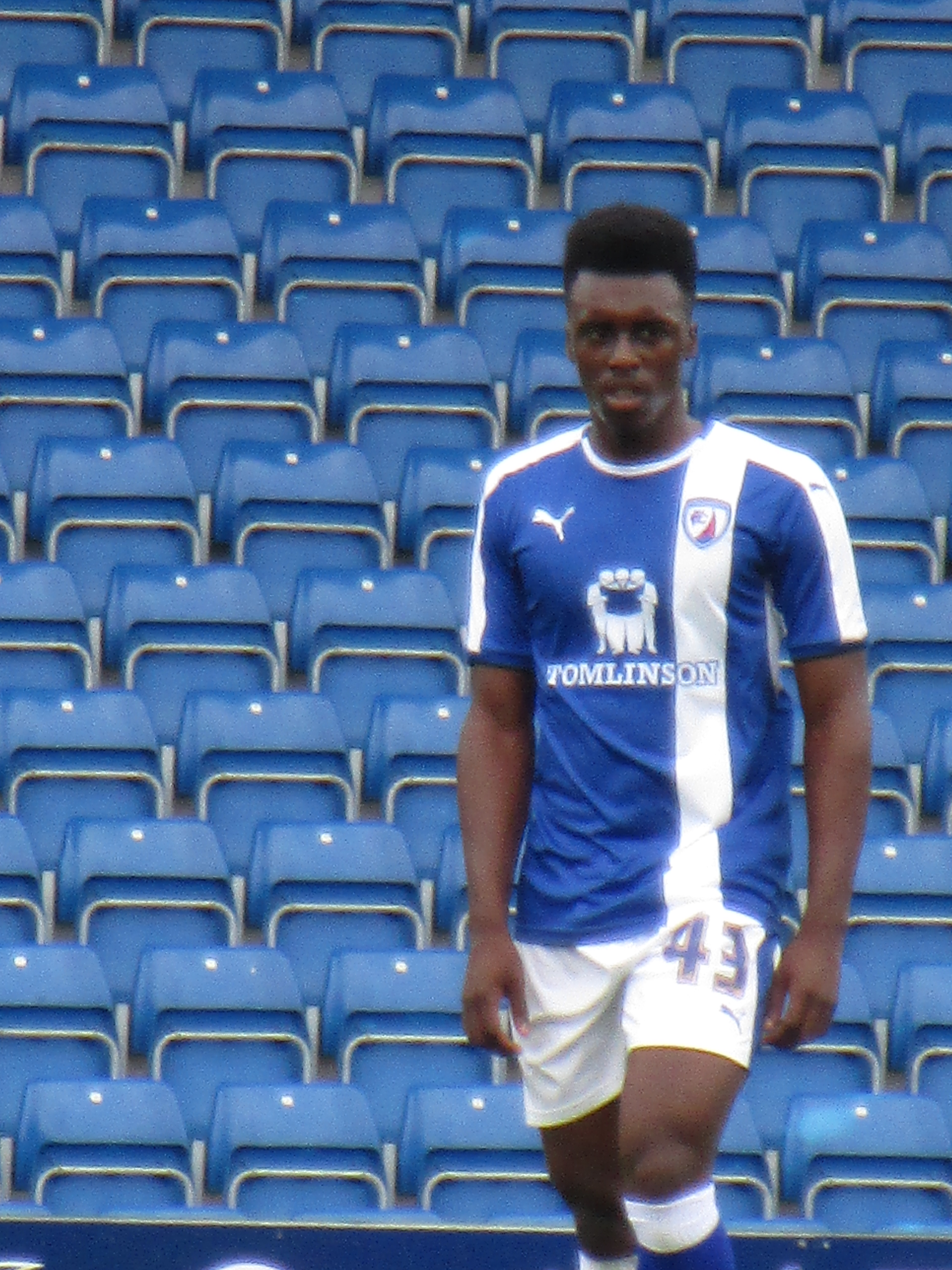
- Morrison Playing for Chesterfield in July 2016.

Personal information
- Full name: Curtis Lloyd Morrison
- Date of birth: 2 October 1997 (age 29)
- Place of birth: Sheffield, England
- Position: Midfielder

Team information
- Current team: Stalybridge Celtic

Youth career
- Chesterfield

Senior career*
Years	Team	Apps	(Gls)
2016–2017	Chesterfield	1	(0)
2016	→ Gainsborough Trinity (loan)	5	(0)
2016	→ Matlock Town (loan)		
2017	→ Matlock Town (loan)		
2017–2019	Guiseley	25	(0)
2017	→ Buxton (loan)		
2018	→ Matlock Town (loan)		
2019	Hednesford Town	0	(0)
2019–2020	Gainsborough Trinity	19	(3)
2020–2021	Banbury United		
2021–2022	Gainsborough Trinity	12	(1)
2022	Cleethorpes Town	5	(0)
2022	Ossett United	6	(0)
2022	Hyde United	3	(0)
2022–2023	Nantwich Town	8	(0)
2023–2026	Stalybridge Celtic	0	(0)
2026–	Burngreave United FC	0	(0)
- * Club domestic league appearances and goals as of 14:25, 24 March 2023 (UTC)

Curtis Lloyd Morrison (born 2 October 1997) is an English footballer who plays as a midfielder for Burngreave United FC.

== Career ==
Morrison began his career with Chesterfield and made his professional debut in a 3–1 EFL Cup defeat against Rochdale.

On 31 August 2016, Morrison joined Gainsborough Trinity on a youth loan. On 30 September 2016 Morrison joined Matlock Town on a youth loan. On 20 January 2017, he rejoined Matlock Town on another youth loan, which was extended to a season-long loan on 22 March 2017. He left Guiseley in May 2019.

In June 2019, he joined Hednesford Town.

On 21 July 2021, Morrison re-joined Gainsborough for a third time.

On 11 February 2022, Morrison joined Northern Premier League Division One East side Cleethorpes Town on a free transfer.

On 24 March 2022, Morrison was one of four players to sign for Northern Premier League Division One East side Ossett United.

In September 2022, Morrison signed for Nantwich Town from league rivals Hyde United. He joined Stalybridge Celtic in March 2023.

== Career statistics ==
As of match played 20 August 2016

Appearances and goals by club, season and competition
Club	Season	League			FA Cup		League Cup		Other		Total	
Club	Season	Division	Apps	Goals	Apps	Goals	Apps	Goals	Apps	Goals	Apps	Goals
Chesterfield	2016–17	League One	1	0	0	0	1	0	0	0	2	0
Gainsborough Trinity	2016–17	National League North	5	0	0	0	–		0	0	5	0
Matlock Town	2016–17	Northern Premier League	0	0	1	0	–		0	0	1	0
Career total			6	0	1	0	1	0	0	0	8	0
