= Johnny Gorman =

Footballer (born 1992)

Personal information
- Full name: Rory John McCaughan Gorman
- Date of birth: 26 October 1992 (age 34)
- Place of birth: Sheffield, England
- Height: 1.75 m (5 ft 9 in)
- Position: Winger

Youth career
- 2002–2003: Manchester City
- 2003–2009: Manchester United
- 2009–2011: Wolverhampton Wanderers

Senior career*
Years	Team	Apps	(Gls)
2011–2013	Wolverhampton Wanderers	1	(0)
2012	→ Plymouth Argyle (loan)	2	(0)
2013	→ Macclesfield Town (loan)	1	(0)
2013	→ Cambridge United (loan)	2	(0)
2013–2014	Leyton Orient	2	(0)
2014	Southport	5	(1)
2014–2015	Barrow	21	(1)
2015–2016	AFC Telford United	6	(0)
2016	→ Colwyn Bay (loan)	3	(0)
2016–2017	Curzon Ashton	11	(0)
2017	→ Ashton United (loan)	3	(0)
2017	Atherton Collieries	12	(1)
2017–2018	Northwich Victoria	31	(6)
2018–2021	Frome Town	28	(2)

International career^{‡}
- Republic of Ireland U16
	Northern Ireland U16	2	(1)
	Northern Ireland U17	5	(0)
	Northern Ireland U18	1	(0)
	Northern Ireland U19	3	(1)
	Northern Ireland U20	1	(0)
2011–2013	Northern Ireland U21	8	(0)
2010–2011	Northern Ireland	9	(0)
- * Club domestic league appearances and goals as of 15:12, 10 May 2016 (UTC) ‡ National team caps and goals as of 21:35, 19 November 2013 (UTC)

Rory John McCaughan Gorman (born 26 October 1992) is a former footballer who played as a winger.

Gorman began his career with Manchester City before transferring to Manchester United. After six years at United, he was released and joined Wolverhampton Wanderers in 2009. He made a single appearance for Wolves and later went on loan to Plymouth Argyle, Macclesfield Town, and Cambridge United. He then signed permanently with Leyton Orient, where he spent one season.

Born in Sheffield, Gorman initially represented the Republic of Ireland at under-16 level. He later switched allegiance to Northern Ireland, progressing through the youth ranks and earning his first senior international cap in 2010.

== Club career ==
Gorman was born in Sheffield, and began his football career as a nine-year-old with Manchester City in 2002. A year later, he was signed by Manchester United, where he stayed until 2009, when he joined the Wolverhampton Wanderers Academy. During this time, he earned numerous caps at various Northern Ireland junior levels.

Gorman attended Repton School in Derbyshire, for whom he played in the 2010 Independent Schools Football Association Boodles Cup Final against Shrewsbury School. During his studies, he won the "Michael Bristow Academy Scholar of the Year" and "Wolves' Academy Player of the Year" awards for the 2010–11 season, as well as finishing runner-up in the Daily Telegraph/Aviva-sponsored "School Sport Matters Awards 2010 – Male Student of the Year" award.

Gorman signed his first professional contract in March 2011, a two-year deal which was to keep him with the club until the summer of 2013. He made his club debut when he appeared as a substitute in a 2–1 Premier League defeat at Norwich City on 24 March 2012, which was to be his only first team appearance for Wolves.

The midfielder joined League Two side Plymouth Argyle on loan for five months on 6 August 2012, for whom he scored his first competitive goal in a 3–0 League Cup win on his debut against Portsmouth on 14 August. However, as a result of a lack of regular first team opportunities at Plymouth, he returned to Wolves on 22 September 2012.

On 31 January 2013, he joined non-league Macclesfield Town on loan until 1 March, but only made one substitute appearance. His loan with Macclesfield over, he joined another Conference club for the remainder of the season when he was loaned to Cambridge United, where he made two appearances.

Gorman's contract at Wolves expired at the end of the 2012–13 season and it was announced that it would not be renewed, leaving him a free agent. He left having made only one first-team appearance for the club. After impressing on trial earlier in the summer, Gorman signed a one-year contract with Leyton Orient on 1 August 2013. He found his opportunities limited at Orient, and at the end of the season he was released by the club along with four other players.

On 22 August 2014, Gorman signed for non-league side Southport.

On 4 October 2014, Gorman signed non-contract terms with Conference North side Barrow following his release from Southport.

In summer 2016, he joined Curzon Ashton.

In February 2017 he joined Atherton Collieries on dual registration terms.

In November 2018 he joined Frome Town

== International career ==
Despite having never played a senior game at club level, Gorman made his international debut on 26 May 2010 – aged 17 years and 222 days – for Northern Ireland in a 2–0 friendly defeat to Turkey played in Connecticut, USA. He made his competitive international debut in UEFA Euro 2012 qualifying in a 1–0 victory in Slovenia on 3 September 2010.

== Personal life ==
He studied psychology at the University of Bath. where he published his first academic paper “Inside the Football Factory: Young Players Reflection on Being Released,” documenting the various difficulties young professional footballers face once released from the game.

Gorman now works for the NHS. He is currently in training as a clinical psychologist.
