= Derek Daly (footballer) =

Irish footballer (born 1997)

Personal information
- Full name: Derek Kevin Daly
- Date of birth: 25 August 1997 (age 29)
- Place of birth: Dublin, Ireland
- Height: 5 ft 10 in (1.78 m)

Team information
- Current team: Longford Town

Youth career
- Cherry Orchard
- Chesterfield

Senior career*
Years	Team	Apps	(Gls)
2015–2017	Chesterfield	2	(0)
2016	→ Sheffield (loan)		
2016	→ Frickley Athletic (loan)		
2017–2018	Waterford	40	(4)
2019–2020	Bray Wanderers	45	(6)
2021	Athlone Town	26	(2)
2022	Crumlin United		
2023–	Longford Town	16	(1)
- * Club domestic league appearances and goals

Derek Daly (born 25 August 1997) is an Irish footballer who plays for League of Ireland First Division side Longford Town.

== Career ==
Born in Limerick, Daly played youth football with Dublin club Cherry Orchard. He represented Ireland at under-16 level.

Daly made his debut for Chesterfield on 26 December 2015, in a 2–0 defeat to Peterborough United at London Road Stadium, being taken off at half-time for Richard Wood. In May 2016, Daly was offered his first professional contract by Chesterfield. In November 2016, Daly was loaned to Frickley Athletic for a month. He also spent time on loan at Sheffield.

On 22 February Daly signed for League of Ireland First Division club Waterford on the Irish transfer deadline day. Daly made his debut coming off the bench in a 1–0 defeat away to Athlone Town on 24 February. He scored his first goal for Waterford on 17 April in a 2–0 victory Over Cobh Ramblers in the League of Ireland Cup scoring his side's second goal. He was awarded the club's players of the month award for April which was chosen by the members of the Blues Supporters Club. Daly scored crucial goals in his team's league games in a vital part of the season notching goals against Wexford on 12 May and against Longford Town on 19 May which both resulted in 1–0 wins. Daly played a vital role as Waterford won promotion to the League of Ireland Premier Division with a number of outstanding performances throughout the year. After Waterford beat Wexford 3-0 and Cobh Ramblers were defeated 3–0 by Cabinteely Waterford were officially crowned league champions and promoted back to the League of Ireland Premier Division. Daly's impressive season was capped off by being named in the League of Ireland First Division team of the year for 2017, he was also awarded Waterford's Young Player of the Year award as well as winning the club's Goal of the Season award for his incredible strike against Athlone Town in July.

Daly signed a new one-year contract extension to remain at Waterford for the 2018 League of Ireland Premier Division season. Daly scored his first goal of the 2018 season in the EA Sports Cup as Waterford defeated amateur side UCC 4–1. Daly then scored his first league goal of the season on 20 April in a commanding 3–0 win over Bray Wanderers.

On 6 December 2018, Daly signed for fellow First Division side Bray Wanderers ahead of the 2019 season. On 22 February Derek made his debut for Bray starting in a 3–0 win over Cabinteely. Daly scored his first Wanderers goal in a 3–2 win over Wexford in the EA Sports Cup scoring a clever low free-kick. On 17 May Daly scored his first League goal for Bray, scoring the final of five goals in a 5–0 win over Athlone

On 14 December 2020, it was announced that Daly signed for Athlone Town ahead of the 2021 League of Ireland First Division where he spent one season before joining Crumlin United in the Leinster Senior League. In December 2022, Daly joined Longford Town ahead of the 2023 season.

== Honours ==
Waterford

- League of Ireland First Division (1): 2017
